= List of minor planets: 6001–7000 =

The following is a partial list of minor planets, running from minor-planet number 6001 through 7000, inclusive. The primary data for this and other partial lists is based on JPL's "Small-Body Orbital Elements" and data available from the Minor Planet Center. Critical list information is also provided by the MPC, unless otherwise specified from Lowell Observatory. A detailed description of the table's columns and additional sources are given on the main page including a complete list of every page in this series, and a statistical break-up on the dynamical classification of minor planets.

Also see the summary list of all named bodies in numerical and alphabetical order, and the corresponding naming citations for the number range of this particular list. New namings may only be added to this list after official publication, as the preannouncement of names is condemned by the Working Group for Small Bodies Nomenclature of the International Astronomical Union.

Near-Earth obj.	MBA (inner)	MBA (outer)	Centaur
Mars-crosser	MBA (middle)	Jupiter trojan	Trans-Neptunian obj.
Unclassified

== 6001–6100 ==
Designation			Discovery			Properties		Ref
Permanent	Provisional	Named after	Date	Site	Discoverer(s)	Category	Diam.	Ref
6001 Thales	1988 CP_{2}	Thales	February 11, 1988	La Silla	E. W. Elst	KOR · slow	8.6 km (5.3 mi)	MPC · JPL
6002 Eetion	1988 RO	Eetion	September 8, 1988	Brorfelde	P. Jensen	L5	40 km (25 mi)	MPC · JPL
6003	1988 VO_{1}	—	November 2, 1988	Kushiro	S. Ueda, H. Kaneda	V · slow	4.4 km (2.7 mi)	MPC · JPL
6004	1988 XY_{1}	—	December 11, 1988	Kushiro	S. Ueda, H. Kaneda	·	4.8 km (3.0 mi)	MPC · JPL
6005	1989 BD	—	January 29, 1989	Kushiro	S. Ueda, H. Kaneda	·	9.2 km (5.7 mi)	MPC · JPL
6006 Anaximandros	1989 GB_{4}	Anaximandros	April 3, 1989	La Silla	E. W. Elst	KOR	7.5 km (4.7 mi)	MPC · JPL
6007 Billevans	1990 BE_{2}	Billevans	January 28, 1990	Kushiro	S. Ueda, H. Kaneda	·	5.8 km (3.6 mi)	MPC · JPL
6008	1990 BF_{2}	—	January 30, 1990	Kushiro	S. Ueda, H. Kaneda	slow	3.7 km (2.3 mi)	MPC · JPL
6009 Yuzuruyoshii	1990 FQ_{1}	Yuzuruyoshii	March 24, 1990	Palomar	E. F. Helin	PHO	10 km (6.2 mi)	MPC · JPL
6010 Lyzenga	1990 OE	Lyzenga	July 19, 1990	Palomar	E. F. Helin	EUN	6.3 km (3.9 mi)	MPC · JPL
6011 Tozzi	1990 QU_{5}	Tozzi	August 29, 1990	Palomar	H. E. Holt	·	7.4 km (4.6 mi)	MPC · JPL
6012 Williammurdoch	1990 SK_{4}	Williammurdoch	September 22, 1990	Siding Spring	R. H. McNaught	·	6.2 km (3.9 mi)	MPC · JPL
6013 Andanike	1991 OZ	Andanike	July 18, 1991	Palomar	H. E. Holt	·	6.2 km (3.9 mi)	MPC · JPL
6014 Chribrenmark	1991 PO_{10}	Chribrenmark	August 7, 1991	Palomar	H. E. Holt	V	5.6 km (3.5 mi)	MPC · JPL
6015 Paularego	1991 PR_{10}	Paularego	August 7, 1991	Palomar	H. E. Holt	·	8.8 km (5.5 mi)	MPC · JPL
6016 Carnelli	1991 PA_{11}	Carnelli	August 7, 1991	Palomar	H. E. Holt	moon	3.5 km (2.2 mi)	MPC · JPL
6017 Robertmorehead	1991 PY_{11}	Robertmorehead	August 7, 1991	Palomar	H. E. Holt	fast	3.5 km (2.2 mi)	MPC · JPL
6018 Pierssac	1991 PS_{16}	Pierssac	August 7, 1991	Palomar	H. E. Holt	BAP	5.6 km (3.5 mi)	MPC · JPL
6019 Telford	1991 RO_{6}	Telford	September 3, 1991	Siding Spring	R. H. McNaught	EOS	16 km (9.9 mi)	MPC · JPL
6020 Miyamoto	1991 SL_{1}	Miyamoto	September 30, 1991	Kitami	K. Endate, K. Watanabe	·	5.3 km (3.3 mi)	MPC · JPL
6021	1991 TM	—	October 1, 1991	Siding Spring	R. H. McNaught	V	5.5 km (3.4 mi)	MPC · JPL
6022 Jyuro	1992 UB_{4}	Jyuro	October 26, 1992	Kitami	K. Endate, K. Watanabe	·	4.2 km (2.6 mi)	MPC · JPL
6023 Tsuyashima	1992 UQ_{4}	Tsuyashima	October 26, 1992	Kitami	K. Endate, K. Watanabe	·	4.9 km (3.0 mi)	MPC · JPL
6024 Ochanomizu	1992 UT_{4}	Ochanomizu	October 27, 1992	Dynic	A. Sugie	·	10 km (6.2 mi)	MPC · JPL
6025 Naotosato	1992 YA_{3}	Naotosato	December 30, 1992	Oohira	T. Urata	EOS	18 km (11 mi)	MPC · JPL
6026 Xenophanes	1993 BA_{8}	Xenophanes	January 23, 1993	La Silla	E. W. Elst	·	12 km (7.5 mi)	MPC · JPL
6027 Waratah	1993 SS_{2}	Waratah	September 23, 1993	Siding Spring	G. J. Garradd	·	7.1 km (4.4 mi)	MPC · JPL
6028	1994 ER_{1}	—	March 11, 1994	Kushiro	S. Ueda, H. Kaneda	RAF	7.4 km (4.6 mi)	MPC · JPL
6029 Edithrand	1948 AG	Edithrand	January 14, 1948	Mount Hamilton	Wirtanen, E.	H	2.3 km (1.4 mi)	MPC · JPL
6030 Zolensky	1981 EG_{36}	Zolensky	March 7, 1981	Siding Spring	S. J. Bus	·	9.3 km (5.8 mi)	MPC · JPL
6031 Ryokan	1982 BQ_{4}	Ryokan	January 26, 1982	Kiso	H. Kosai, K. Furukawa	EOS	16 km (9.9 mi)	MPC · JPL
6032 Nobel	1983 PY	Nobel	August 4, 1983	Nauchnij	L. G. Karachkina	·	7.4 km (4.6 mi)	MPC · JPL
6033 Southwood	1984 SQ_{4}	Southwood	September 24, 1984	La Silla	H. Debehogne	URS	16 km (9.9 mi)	MPC · JPL
6034	1987 JA	—	May 5, 1987	Lake Tekapo	A. C. Gilmore, P. M. Kilmartin	·	3.5 km (2.2 mi)	MPC · JPL
6035 Citlaltépetl	1987 OR	Citlaltépetl	July 27, 1987	Haute-Provence	E. W. Elst	PHO	4.2 km (2.6 mi)	MPC · JPL
6036 Weinberg	1988 CV_{3}	Weinberg	February 13, 1988	La Silla	E. W. Elst	·	6.4 km (4.0 mi)	MPC · JPL
6037	1988 EG	—	March 12, 1988	Palomar	J. Alu	APO · PHA	600 m (2,000 ft)	MPC · JPL
6038	1989 EQ	—	March 4, 1989	Siding Spring	R. H. McNaught	·	22 km (14 mi)	MPC · JPL
6039 Parmenides	1989 RS	Parmenides	September 3, 1989	Haute-Provence	E. W. Elst	CYB	22 km (14 mi)	MPC · JPL
6040	1990 DK_{3}	—	February 24, 1990	La Silla	H. Debehogne	NYS	4.8 km (3.0 mi)	MPC · JPL
6041 Juterkilian	1990 KL	Juterkilian	May 21, 1990	Palomar	E. F. Helin	·	5.5 km (3.4 mi)	MPC · JPL
6042 Cheshirecat	1990 WW_{2}	Cheshirecat	November 23, 1990	Yakiimo	Natori, A., T. Urata	·	10 km (6.2 mi)	MPC · JPL
6043 Aurochs	1991 RK_{2}	Aurochs	September 9, 1991	Kiyosato	S. Otomo	V	4.9 km (3.0 mi)	MPC · JPL
6044 Hammer-Purgstall	1991 RW_{4}	Hammer-Purgstall	September 13, 1991	Tautenburg Observatory	L. D. Schmadel, F. Börngen	GEF	5.7 km (3.5 mi)	MPC · JPL
6045	1991 RG_{9}	—	September 11, 1991	Palomar	H. E. Holt	·	4.6 km (2.9 mi)	MPC · JPL
6046	1991 RF_{14}	—	September 13, 1991	Palomar	H. E. Holt	·	5.3 km (3.3 mi)	MPC · JPL
6047	1991 TB_{1}	—	October 10, 1991	Palomar	Rose, P.	APO +1 km (0.62 mi)	960 m (3,150 ft)	MPC · JPL
6048	1991 UC_{1}	—	October 18, 1991	Kushiro	S. Ueda, H. Kaneda	·	6.4 km (4.0 mi)	MPC · JPL
6049 Toda	1991 VP	Toda	November 2, 1991	Kitami	A. Takahashi, K. Watanabe	·	7.6 km (4.7 mi)	MPC · JPL
6050 Miwablock	1992 AE	Miwablock	January 10, 1992	Kitt Peak	Spacewatch	AMO +1 km (0.62 mi)	2.9 km (1.8 mi)	MPC · JPL
6051 Anaximenes	1992 BX_{1}	Anaximenes	January 30, 1992	La Silla	E. W. Elst	·	8.8 km (5.5 mi)	MPC · JPL
6052 Junichi	1992 CE_{1}	Junichi	February 9, 1992	Kitami	K. Endate, K. Watanabe	·	25 km (16 mi)	MPC · JPL
6053	1993 BW_{3}	—	January 30, 1993	Siding Spring	R. H. McNaught	AMO · APO +1 km (0.62 mi)	3.7 km (2.3 mi)	MPC · JPL
6054 Ghiberti	4019 P-L	Ghiberti	September 24, 1960	Palomar	C. J. van Houten, I. van Houten-Groeneveld, T. Gehrels	·	4.9 km (3.0 mi)	MPC · JPL
6055 Brunelleschi	2158 T-3	Brunelleschi	October 16, 1977	Palomar	C. J. van Houten, I. van Houten-Groeneveld, T. Gehrels	·	3.4 km (2.1 mi)	MPC · JPL
6056 Donatello	2318 T-3	Donatello	October 16, 1977	Palomar	C. J. van Houten, I. van Houten-Groeneveld, T. Gehrels	·	12 km (7.5 mi)	MPC · JPL
6057 Robbia	5182 T-3	Robbia	October 16, 1977	Palomar	C. J. van Houten, I. van Houten-Groeneveld, T. Gehrels	CYB	29 km (18 mi)	MPC · JPL
6058 Carlnielsen	1978 VL_{5}	Carlnielsen	November 7, 1978	Palomar	E. F. Helin, S. J. Bus	·	5.3 km (3.3 mi)	MPC · JPL
6059 Diefenbach	1979 TA	Diefenbach	October 11, 1979	Kleť	Z. Vávrová	·	8.2 km (5.1 mi)	MPC · JPL
6060 Doudleby	1980 DX	Doudleby	February 19, 1980	Kleť	A. Mrkos	·	6.8 km (4.2 mi)	MPC · JPL
6061	1981 SQ_{2}	—	September 20, 1981	La Silla	H. Debehogne	·	4.7 km (2.9 mi)	MPC · JPL
6062 Vespa	1983 JQ	Vespa	May 6, 1983	Anderson Mesa	N. G. Thomas	THM	17 km (11 mi)	MPC · JPL
6063 Jason	1984 KB	Jason	May 27, 1984	Palomar	C. S. Shoemaker, E. M. Shoemaker	APO +1 km (0.62 mi)	1.4 km (0.87 mi)	MPC · JPL
6064 Holašovice	1987 HE_{1}	Holašovice	April 23, 1987	Kleť	A. Mrkos	slow	4.4 km (2.7 mi)	MPC · JPL
6065 Chesneau	1987 OC	Chesneau	July 27, 1987	Palomar	E. F. Helin, R. S. Dunbar	PHO	5.5 km (3.4 mi)	MPC · JPL
6066 Hendricks	1987 SZ_{3}	Hendricks	September 26, 1987	Anderson Mesa	E. Bowell	·	4.5 km (2.8 mi)	MPC · JPL
6067 Donutil	1990 QR_{11}	Donutil	August 28, 1990	Kleť	Z. Vávrová	·	14 km (8.7 mi)	MPC · JPL
6068 Brandenburg	1990 TJ_{2}	Brandenburg	October 10, 1990	Tautenburg Observatory	F. Börngen, L. D. Schmadel	EOS	9.2 km (5.7 mi)	MPC · JPL
6069 Cevolani	1991 PW_{17}	Cevolani	August 8, 1991	Palomar	H. E. Holt	·	3.9 km (2.4 mi)	MPC · JPL
6070 Rheinland	1991 XO_{1}	Rheinland	December 10, 1991	Tautenburg Observatory	F. Börngen	NYS	6.8 km (4.2 mi)	MPC · JPL
6071 Sakitama	1992 AS_{1}	Sakitama	January 4, 1992	Okutama	Hioki, T., Hayakawa, S.	·	9.6 km (6.0 mi)	MPC · JPL
6072 Hooghoudt	1280 T-1	Hooghoudt	March 25, 1971	Palomar	C. J. van Houten, I. van Houten-Groeneveld, T. Gehrels	·	15 km (9.3 mi)	MPC · JPL
6073 Tähtiseuraursa	1939 UB	Tähtiseuraursa	October 18, 1939	Turku	Y. Väisälä	EUN ·	8.9 km (5.5 mi)	MPC · JPL
6074 Bechtereva	1968 QE	Bechtereva	August 24, 1968	Nauchnij	T. M. Smirnova	NYS	5.9 km (3.7 mi)	MPC · JPL
6075 Zajtsev	1976 GH_{2}	Zajtsev	April 1, 1976	Nauchnij	N. S. Chernykh	THM	15 km (9.3 mi)	MPC · JPL
6076 Plavec	1980 CR	Plavec	February 14, 1980	Kleť	L. Brožek	·	17 km (11 mi)	MPC · JPL
6077 Messner	1980 TM	Messner	October 3, 1980	Kleť	Z. Vávrová	AGN	8.3 km (5.2 mi)	MPC · JPL
6078 Burt	1980 TC_{5}	Burt	October 10, 1980	Palomar	C. S. Shoemaker	GEF	6.9 km (4.3 mi)	MPC · JPL
6079 Gerokurat	1981 DG_{3}	Gerokurat	February 28, 1981	Siding Spring	S. J. Bus	URS	22 km (14 mi)	MPC · JPL
6080 Lugmair	1981 EY_{26}	Lugmair	March 2, 1981	Siding Spring	S. J. Bus	HYG	12 km (7.5 mi)	MPC · JPL
6081 Cloutis	1981 EE_{35}	Cloutis	March 2, 1981	Siding Spring	S. J. Bus	·	2.5 km (1.6 mi)	MPC · JPL
6082 Timiryazev	1982 UH_{8}	Timiryazev	October 21, 1982	Nauchnij	L. V. Zhuravleva	slow	6.9 km (4.3 mi)	MPC · JPL
6083 Janeirabloom	1984 SQ_{2}	Janeirabloom	September 25, 1984	Anderson Mesa	B. A. Skiff	·	4.0 km (2.5 mi)	MPC · JPL
6084 Bascom	1985 CT	Bascom	February 12, 1985	Palomar	C. S. Shoemaker, E. M. Shoemaker	PHO · moon	6.3 km (3.9 mi)	MPC · JPL
6085 Fraethi	1987 SN_{3}	Fraethi	September 25, 1987	Brorfelde	P. Jensen	V	5.0 km (3.1 mi)	MPC · JPL
6086 Vrchlický	1987 VU	Vrchlický	November 15, 1987	Kleť	Z. Vávrová	moon	7.6 km (4.7 mi)	MPC · JPL
6087 Lupo	1988 FK	Lupo	March 19, 1988	Palomar	C. S. Shoemaker, E. M. Shoemaker	H	1.5 km (0.93 mi)	MPC · JPL
6088 Hoshigakubo	1988 UH	Hoshigakubo	October 18, 1988	Geisei	T. Seki	·	10 km (6.2 mi)	MPC · JPL
6089 Izumi	1989 AF_{1}	Izumi	January 5, 1989	Ayashi Station	M. Koishikawa	(254)	4.1 km (2.5 mi)	MPC · JPL
6090 Aulis	1989 DJ	Aulis	February 27, 1989	La Silla	H. Debehogne	L4	60 km (37 mi)	MPC · JPL
6091 Mitsuru	1990 DA_{1}	Mitsuru	February 28, 1990	Kitami	K. Endate, K. Watanabe	·	4.4 km (2.7 mi)	MPC · JPL
6092 Johnmason	1990 MN	Johnmason	June 27, 1990	Palomar	E. F. Helin	·	5.4 km (3.4 mi)	MPC · JPL
6093 Makoto	1990 QP_{5}	Makoto	August 30, 1990	Kitami	K. Endate, K. Watanabe	·	5.9 km (3.7 mi)	MPC · JPL
6094 Hisako	1990 VQ_{1}	Hisako	November 10, 1990	Okutama	Hioki, T., Hayakawa, S.	EUN	9.3 km (5.8 mi)	MPC · JPL
6095	1991 UU	—	October 18, 1991	Kushiro	S. Ueda, H. Kaneda	·	5.3 km (3.3 mi)	MPC · JPL
6096	1991 UB_{2}	—	October 29, 1991	Kushiro	S. Ueda, H. Kaneda	V	4.0 km (2.5 mi)	MPC · JPL
6097 Koishikawa	1991 UK_{2}	Koishikawa	October 29, 1991	Kitami	K. Endate, K. Watanabe	V	5.2 km (3.2 mi)	MPC · JPL
6098 Mutojunkyu	1991 UW_{3}	Mutojunkyu	October 31, 1991	Kushiro	Matsuyama, M., K. Watanabe	moon	3.7 km (2.3 mi)	MPC · JPL
6099 Saarland	1991 UH_{4}	Saarland	October 30, 1991	Tautenburg Observatory	F. Börngen	·	6.3 km (3.9 mi)	MPC · JPL
6100 Kunitomoikkansai	1991 VK_{4}	Kunitomoikkansai	November 9, 1991	Dynic	A. Sugie	moon	4.1 km (2.5 mi)	MPC · JPL

== 6101–6200 ==
back to top

Designation			Discovery			Properties		Ref
Permanent	Provisional	Named after	Date	Site	Discoverer(s)	Category	Diam.	Ref
6101 Tomoki	1993 EG	Tomoki	March 1, 1993	Oohira	T. Urata	·	4.3 km (2.7 mi)	MPC · JPL
6102 Visby	1993 FQ_{25}	Visby	March 21, 1993	La Silla	UESAC	·	4.5 km (2.8 mi)	MPC · JPL
6103	1993 HV	—	April 16, 1993	Kushiro	S. Ueda, H. Kaneda	CYB	29 km (18 mi)	MPC · JPL
6104 Takao	1993 HZ	Takao	April 16, 1993	Kitami	K. Endate, K. Watanabe	·	8.6 km (5.3 mi)	MPC · JPL
6105 Verrocchio	4580 P-L	Verrocchio	September 24, 1960	Palomar	C. J. van Houten, I. van Houten-Groeneveld, T. Gehrels	ADE ·	4.1 km (2.5 mi)	MPC · JPL
6106 Stoss	6564 P-L	Stoss	September 24, 1960	Palomar	C. J. van Houten, I. van Houten-Groeneveld, T. Gehrels	THM	14 km (8.7 mi)	MPC · JPL
6107 Osterbrock	1948 AF	Osterbrock	January 14, 1948	Mount Hamilton	C. A. Wirtanen	H	4.4 km (2.7 mi)	MPC · JPL
6108 Glebov	1971 QN	Glebov	August 18, 1971	Nauchnij	T. M. Smirnova	·	3.4 km (2.1 mi)	MPC · JPL
6109 Balseiro	1975 QC	Balseiro	August 29, 1975	El Leoncito	Félix Aguilar Observatory	V	4.6 km (2.9 mi)	MPC · JPL
6110 Kazak	1978 NQ_{1}	Kazak	July 4, 1978	Nauchnij	L. I. Chernykh	·	3.3 km (2.1 mi)	MPC · JPL
6111 Davemckay	1979 SP_{13}	Davemckay	September 20, 1979	Palomar	S. J. Bus	·	8.7 km (5.4 mi)	MPC · JPL
6112 Ludolfschultz	1981 DB_{1}	Ludolfschultz	February 28, 1981	Siding Spring	S. J. Bus	·	7.9 km (4.9 mi)	MPC · JPL
6113 Tsap	1982 SX_{5}	Tsap	September 16, 1982	Nauchnij	L. I. Chernykh	·	13 km (8.1 mi)	MPC · JPL
6114 Dalla-Degregori	1984 HS_{1}	Dalla-Degregori	April 28, 1984	La Silla	W. Ferreri	·	4.0 km (2.5 mi)	MPC · JPL
6115 Martinduncan	1984 SR_{2}	Martinduncan	September 25, 1984	Anderson Mesa	B. A. Skiff	·	4.9 km (3.0 mi)	MPC · JPL
6116 Still	1984 UB_{3}	Still	October 26, 1984	Anderson Mesa	E. Bowell	·	8.9 km (5.5 mi)	MPC · JPL
6117 Brevardastro	1985 CZ_{1}	Brevardastro	February 12, 1985	La Silla	H. Debehogne	V	5.2 km (3.2 mi)	MPC · JPL
6118 Mayuboshi	1986 QX_{3}	Mayuboshi	August 31, 1986	La Silla	H. Debehogne	·	11 km (6.8 mi)	MPC · JPL
6119 Hjorth	1986 XH	Hjorth	December 6, 1986	Brorfelde	P. Jensen	EUN	6.4 km (4.0 mi)	MPC · JPL
6120 Anhalt	1987 QR	Anhalt	August 21, 1987	Tautenburg Observatory	F. Börngen	·	4.8 km (3.0 mi)	MPC · JPL
6121 Plachinda	1987 RU_{3}	Plachinda	September 2, 1987	Nauchnij	L. I. Chernykh	·	5.4 km (3.4 mi)	MPC · JPL
6122 Henrard	1987 SW_{1}	Henrard	September 21, 1987	Anderson Mesa	E. Bowell	·	9.0 km (5.6 mi)	MPC · JPL
6123 Aristoteles	1987 SH_{2}	Aristoteles	September 19, 1987	Smolyan	E. W. Elst	·	6.9 km (4.3 mi)	MPC · JPL
6124 Mecklenburg	1987 SL_{10}	Mecklenburg	September 29, 1987	Tautenburg Observatory	F. Börngen	T_{j} (2.98) · HIL · 3:2 · (6124)	20 km (12 mi)	MPC · JPL
6125 Singto	1989 CN	Singto	February 4, 1989	Kushiro	S. Ueda, H. Kaneda	·	4.0 km (2.5 mi)	MPC · JPL
6126 Hubelmatt	1989 EW_{1}	Hubelmatt	March 5, 1989	Kleť	Z. Vávrová	·	4.8 km (3.0 mi)	MPC · JPL
6127 Hetherington	1989 HD	Hetherington	April 25, 1989	Palomar	E. F. Helin	EUN	5.5 km (3.4 mi)	MPC · JPL
6128 Lasorda	1989 LA	Lasorda	June 3, 1989	Palomar	E. F. Helin	·	11 km (6.8 mi)	MPC · JPL
6129 Demokritos	1989 RB_{2}	Demokritos	September 4, 1989	Haute-Provence	E. W. Elst	DOR	17 km (11 mi)	MPC · JPL
6130 Hutton	1989 SL_{5}	Hutton	September 24, 1989	Siding Spring	R. H. McNaught	T_{j} (2.91)	3.1 km (1.9 mi)	MPC · JPL
6131 Towen	1990 OO_{3}	Towen	July 27, 1990	Palomar	H. E. Holt	·	7.4 km (4.6 mi)	MPC · JPL
6132 Danielson	1990 QY_{3}	Danielson	August 22, 1990	Palomar	H. E. Holt	·	7.2 km (4.5 mi)	MPC · JPL
6133 Royaldutchastro	1990 RC_{3}	Royaldutchastro	September 14, 1990	Palomar	H. E. Holt	·	9.5 km (5.9 mi)	MPC · JPL
6134 Kamagari	1990 RA_{5}	Kamagari	September 15, 1990	Palomar	H. E. Holt	EUN	5.0 km (3.1 mi)	MPC · JPL
6135 Billowen	1990 RD_{9}	Billowen	September 14, 1990	Palomar	H. E. Holt	·	11 km (6.8 mi)	MPC · JPL
6136 Gryphon	1990 YH	Gryphon	December 22, 1990	Yakiimo	Natori, A., T. Urata	EOS	16 km (9.9 mi)	MPC · JPL
6137 Johnfletcher	1991 BY	Johnfletcher	January 25, 1991	Yakiimo	Natori, A., T. Urata	·	31 km (19 mi)	MPC · JPL
6138 Miguelhernández	1991 JH_{1}	Miguelhernández	May 14, 1991	Kiyosato	S. Otomo, O. Muramatsu	NYS	4.8 km (3.0 mi)	MPC · JPL
6139 Naomi	1992 AD_{1}	Naomi	January 10, 1992	Dynic	A. Sugie	·	9.5 km (5.9 mi)	MPC · JPL
6140 Kubokawa	1992 AT_{1}	Kubokawa	January 6, 1992	Kitami	K. Endate, K. Watanabe	·	5.9 km (3.7 mi)	MPC · JPL
6141 Durda	1992 YC_{3}	Durda	December 26, 1992	Kitt Peak	Spacewatch	H · slow	3.0 km (1.9 mi)	MPC · JPL
6142 Tantawi	1993 FP	Tantawi	March 23, 1993	Lake Tekapo	A. C. Gilmore, P. M. Kilmartin	·	9.2 km (5.7 mi)	MPC · JPL
6143 Pythagoras	1993 JV	Pythagoras	May 14, 1993	La Silla	E. W. Elst	KOR	8.0 km (5.0 mi)	MPC · JPL
6144 Kondojiro	1994 EQ_{3}	Kondojiro	March 14, 1994	Kitami	K. Endate, K. Watanabe	T_{j} (2.87)	32 km (20 mi)	MPC · JPL
6145 Riemenschneider	2630 P-L	Riemenschneider	September 26, 1960	Palomar	C. J. van Houten, I. van Houten-Groeneveld, T. Gehrels	NYS	5.0 km (3.1 mi)	MPC · JPL
6146 Adamkrafft	3262 T-2	Adamkrafft	September 30, 1973	Palomar	C. J. van Houten, I. van Houten-Groeneveld, T. Gehrels	·	5.2 km (3.2 mi)	MPC · JPL
6147 Straub	1081 T-3	Straub	October 17, 1977	Palomar	C. J. van Houten, I. van Houten-Groeneveld, T. Gehrels	EUN	7.0 km (4.3 mi)	MPC · JPL
6148 Ignazgünther	5119 T-3	Ignazgünther	October 16, 1977	Palomar	C. J. van Houten, I. van Houten-Groeneveld, T. Gehrels	PHO	4.7 km (2.9 mi)	MPC · JPL
6149 Pelčák	1979 SS	Pelčák	September 25, 1979	Kleť	A. Mrkos	·	4.0 km (2.5 mi)	MPC · JPL
6150 Neukum	1980 FR_{1}	Neukum	March 16, 1980	La Silla	C.-I. Lagerkvist	HYG	12 km (7.5 mi)	MPC · JPL
6151 Viget	1987 WF	Viget	November 19, 1987	Anderson Mesa	E. Bowell	·	5.3 km (3.3 mi)	MPC · JPL
6152 Empedocles	1989 GB_{3}	Empedocles	April 3, 1989	La Silla	E. W. Elst	·	6.9 km (4.3 mi)	MPC · JPL
6153 Hershey	1990 OB	Hershey	July 19, 1990	Palomar	E. F. Helin	·	19 km (12 mi)	MPC · JPL
6154 Stevesynnott	1990 QP_{1}	Stevesynnott	August 22, 1990	Palomar	H. E. Holt	NYS	5.6 km (3.5 mi)	MPC · JPL
6155 Yokosugano	1990 VY_{2}	Yokosugano	November 11, 1990	Minami-Oda	T. Nomura, K. Kawanishi	·	5.8 km (3.6 mi)	MPC · JPL
6156 Dall	1991 AF_{1}	Dall	January 12, 1991	Stakenbridge	B. G. W. Manning	EOS	11 km (6.8 mi)	MPC · JPL
6157 Prey	1991 RX_{2}	Prey	September 9, 1991	Tautenburg Observatory	L. D. Schmadel, F. Börngen	·	3.5 km (2.2 mi)	MPC · JPL
6158 Shosanbetsu	1991 VB_{3}	Shosanbetsu	November 12, 1991	Ojima	T. Niijima, T. Urata	·	4.5 km (2.8 mi)	MPC · JPL
6159 Andréseloy	1991 YH	Andréseloy	December 30, 1991	Kushiro	S. Ueda, H. Kaneda	V	5.3 km (3.3 mi)	MPC · JPL
6160 Minakata	1993 JF	Minakata	May 15, 1993	Nachi-Katsuura	Y. Shimizu, T. Urata	·	4.9 km (3.0 mi)	MPC · JPL
6161 Vojno-Yasenetsky	1971 TY_{2}	Vojno-Yasenetsky	October 14, 1971	Nauchnij	L. I. Chernykh	·	17 km (11 mi)	MPC · JPL
6162 Prokhorov	1973 SR_{6}	Prokhorov	September 25, 1973	Nauchnij	L. V. Zhuravleva	·	6.1 km (3.8 mi)	MPC · JPL
6163 Reimers	1977 FT	Reimers	March 16, 1977	La Silla	H.-E. Schuster	H	2.4 km (1.5 mi)	MPC · JPL
6164 Gerhardmüller	1977 RF_{2}	Gerhardmüller	September 9, 1977	Nauchnij	N. S. Chernykh	·	4.9 km (3.0 mi)	MPC · JPL
6165 Frolova	1978 PD_{3}	Frolova	August 8, 1978	Nauchnij	N. S. Chernykh	V	3.4 km (2.1 mi)	MPC · JPL
6166 Univsima	1978 SP_{4}	Univsima	September 27, 1978	Nauchnij	L. I. Chernykh	EOS	12 km (7.5 mi)	MPC · JPL
6167 Narmanskij	1979 QB_{10}	Narmanskij	August 27, 1979	Nauchnij	N. S. Chernykh	·	4.0 km (2.5 mi)	MPC · JPL
6168 Isnello	1981 EB_{1}	Isnello	March 5, 1981	La Silla	H. Debehogne, G. de Sanctis	·	10 km (6.2 mi)	MPC · JPL
6169 Sashakrot	1981 EX_{4}	Sashakrot	March 2, 1981	Siding Spring	S. J. Bus	slow	10 km (6.2 mi)	MPC · JPL
6170 Levasseur	1981 GP	Levasseur	April 5, 1981	Anderson Mesa	E. Bowell	·	7.1 km (4.4 mi)	MPC · JPL
6171 Uttorp	1981 UT	Uttorp	October 26, 1981	Socorro	Taff, L. G.	·	3.5 km (2.2 mi)	MPC · JPL
6172 Prokofeana	1982 TX	Prokofeana	October 14, 1982	Nauchnij	L. G. Karachkina	·	3.3 km (2.1 mi)	MPC · JPL
6173 Jimwestphal	1983 AD	Jimwestphal	January 9, 1983	Anderson Mesa	B. A. Skiff	·	7.8 km (4.8 mi)	MPC · JPL
6174 Polybius	1983 TR_{2}	Polybius	October 4, 1983	Anderson Mesa	N. G. Thomas	INA	21 km (13 mi)	MPC · JPL
6175 Cori	1983 XW	Cori	December 4, 1983	Kleť	A. Mrkos	THM	15 km (9.3 mi)	MPC · JPL
6176 Horrigan	1985 BH	Horrigan	January 16, 1985	Kleť	Z. Vávrová	·	5.6 km (3.5 mi)	MPC · JPL
6177 Fécamp	1986 CE_{2}	Fécamp	February 12, 1986	La Silla	H. Debehogne	moon	4.8 km (3.0 mi)	MPC · JPL
6178	1986 DA	—	February 16, 1986	Shizuoka	M. Kizawa	AMO +1 km (0.62 mi)	2.3 km (1.4 mi)	MPC · JPL
6179 Brett	1986 EN	Brett	March 3, 1986	Palomar	C. S. Shoemaker, E. M. Shoemaker	PHO	4.9 km (3.0 mi)	MPC · JPL
6180 Bystritskaya	1986 PX_{4}	Bystritskaya	August 8, 1986	Nauchnij	L. I. Chernykh	·	6.0 km (3.7 mi)	MPC · JPL
6181 Bobweber	1986 RW	Bobweber	September 6, 1986	Palomar	E. F. Helin	·	4.5 km (2.8 mi)	MPC · JPL
6182 Katygord	1987 SC_{4}	Katygord	September 21, 1987	Anderson Mesa	E. Bowell	·	5.2 km (3.2 mi)	MPC · JPL
6183 Viscome	1987 SF_{7}	Viscome	September 26, 1987	Palomar	C. S. Shoemaker	slow	6.8 km (4.2 mi)	MPC · JPL
6184 Nordlund	1987 UQ_{3}	Nordlund	October 26, 1987	Brorfelde	P. Jensen	·	4.7 km (2.9 mi)	MPC · JPL
6185 Mitsuma	1987 YD	Mitsuma	December 20, 1987	Chiyoda	T. Kojima	·	9.9 km (6.2 mi)	MPC · JPL
6186 Zenon	1988 CC_{2}	Zenon	February 11, 1988	La Silla	E. W. Elst	moon	7.0 km (4.3 mi)	MPC · JPL
6187 Kagura	1988 RD_{5}	Kagura	September 2, 1988	La Silla	H. Debehogne	THM	14 km (8.7 mi)	MPC · JPL
6188 Robertpepin	1988 SW_{2}	Robertpepin	September 16, 1988	Cerro Tololo	S. J. Bus	THM	12 km (7.5 mi)	MPC · JPL
6189 Völk	1989 EY_{2}	Völk	March 2, 1989	La Silla	E. W. Elst	V	4.0 km (2.5 mi)	MPC · JPL
6190 Rennes	1989 TJ_{1}	Rennes	October 8, 1989	Ayashi Station	M. Koishikawa	·	9.4 km (5.8 mi)	MPC · JPL
6191 Eades	1989 WN_{1}	Eades	November 22, 1989	Stakenbridge	B. G. W. Manning	·	10 km (6.2 mi)	MPC · JPL
6192 Javiergorosabel	1990 KB_{1}	Javiergorosabel	May 21, 1990	Palomar	E. F. Helin	·	6.5 km (4.0 mi)	MPC · JPL
6193 Manabe	1990 QC_{1}	Manabe	August 18, 1990	Kitami	K. Endate, K. Watanabe	·	9.7 km (6.0 mi)	MPC · JPL
6194 Denali	1990 TN	Denali	October 12, 1990	Siding Spring	R. H. McNaught	·	7.2 km (4.5 mi)	MPC · JPL
6195 Nukariya	1990 VL_{2}	Nukariya	November 13, 1990	Kitami	K. Endate, K. Watanabe	·	5.7 km (3.5 mi)	MPC · JPL
6196 Bernardbowen	1991 UO_{4}	Bernardbowen	October 28, 1991	Kushiro	S. Ueda, H. Kaneda	·	4.3 km (2.7 mi)	MPC · JPL
6197 Taracho	1992 AB_{1}	Taracho	January 10, 1992	Karasuyama	S. Inoda, T. Urata	V	4.5 km (2.8 mi)	MPC · JPL
6198 Shirakawa	1992 AF_{1}	Shirakawa	January 10, 1992	Okutama	Hioki, T., Hayakawa, S.	·	4.8 km (3.0 mi)	MPC · JPL
6199 Yoshiokayayoi	1992 BK_{1}	Yoshiokayayoi	January 26, 1992	Dynic	A. Sugie	EUN	9.7 km (6.0 mi)	MPC · JPL
6200 Hachinohe	1993 HL	Hachinohe	April 16, 1993	Kitami	K. Endate, K. Watanabe	·	4.6 km (2.9 mi)	MPC · JPL

== 6201–6300 ==
back to top

Designation			Discovery			Properties		Ref
Permanent	Provisional	Named after	Date	Site	Discoverer(s)	Category	Diam.	Ref
6201 Ichiroshimizu	1993 HY	Ichiroshimizu	April 16, 1993	Kitami	K. Endate, K. Watanabe	(5)	6.8 km (4.2 mi)	MPC · JPL
6202 Georgemiley	3332 T-1	Georgemiley	March 26, 1971	Palomar	C. J. van Houten, I. van Houten-Groeneveld, T. Gehrels	·	2.5 km (1.6 mi)	MPC · JPL
6203 Lyubamoroz	1981 EC_{23}	Lyubamoroz	March 3, 1981	Siding Spring	S. J. Bus	·	9.0 km (5.6 mi)	MPC · JPL
6204 MacKenzie	1981 JB_{3}	MacKenzie	May 6, 1981	Palomar	C. S. Shoemaker	·	2.9 km (1.8 mi)	MPC · JPL
6205 Menottigalli	1983 OD	Menottigalli	July 17, 1983	Anderson Mesa	E. Bowell	PHO	8.2 km (5.1 mi)	MPC · JPL
6206 Corradolamberti	1985 TB_{1}	Corradolamberti	October 15, 1985	Anderson Mesa	E. Bowell	KOR	5.9 km (3.7 mi)	MPC · JPL
6207 Bourvil	1988 BV	Bourvil	January 24, 1988	Kushiro	S. Ueda, H. Kaneda	·	3.3 km (2.1 mi)	MPC · JPL
6208 Wakata	1988 XT	Wakata	December 3, 1988	Kitami	K. Endate, K. Watanabe	·	5.0 km (3.1 mi)	MPC · JPL
6209 Schwaben	1990 TF_{4}	Schwaben	October 12, 1990	Tautenburg Observatory	F. Börngen, L. D. Schmadel	NYS	4.7 km (2.9 mi)	MPC · JPL
6210 Hyunseop	1991 AX_{1}	Hyunseop	January 14, 1991	Kushiro	Matsuyama, M., K. Watanabe	KOR	8.7 km (5.4 mi)	MPC · JPL
6211 Tsubame	1991 DO	Tsubame	February 19, 1991	Karasuyama	S. Inoda, T. Urata	GEF	5.8 km (3.6 mi)	MPC · JPL
6212 Franzthaler	1993 MS_{1}	Franzthaler	June 23, 1993	Palomar	Nassir, M.	·	11 km (6.8 mi)	MPC · JPL
6213 Zwiers	2196 P-L	Zwiers	September 24, 1960	Palomar	C. J. van Houten, I. van Houten-Groeneveld, T. Gehrels	·	2.8 km (1.7 mi)	MPC · JPL
6214 Mikhailgrinev	1971 SN_{2}	Mikhailgrinev	September 26, 1971	Nauchnij	T. M. Smirnova	THM ·	17 km (11 mi)	MPC · JPL
6215 Mehdia	1973 EK	Mehdia	March 7, 1973	Hamburg-Bergedorf	L. Kohoutek	·	13 km (8.1 mi)	MPC · JPL
6216 San Jose	1975 SJ	San Jose	September 30, 1975	Palomar	S. J. Bus	·	8.0 km (5.0 mi)	MPC · JPL
6217 Kodai	1975 XH	Kodai	December 1, 1975	Cerro El Roble	C. Torres, Barros, S.	·	8.3 km (5.2 mi)	MPC · JPL
6218 Mizushima	1977 EG_{7}	Mizushima	March 12, 1977	Kiso	H. Kosai, K. Furukawa	·	3.6 km (2.2 mi)	MPC · JPL
6219 Demalia	1978 PX_{2}	Demalia	August 8, 1978	Nauchnij	N. S. Chernykh	NYS	4.2 km (2.6 mi)	MPC · JPL
6220 Stepanmakarov	1978 SN_{7}	Stepanmakarov	September 26, 1978	Nauchnij	L. V. Zhuravleva	EOS	11 km (6.8 mi)	MPC · JPL
6221 Ducentesima	1980 GO	Ducentesima	April 13, 1980	Kleť	A. Mrkos	THM	13 km (8.1 mi)	MPC · JPL
6222	1980 PB_{3}	—	August 8, 1980	Siding Spring	Royal Observatory Edinburgh	·	27 km (17 mi)	MPC · JPL
6223 Dahl	1980 RD_{1}	Dahl	September 3, 1980	Kleť	A. Mrkos	·	20 km (12 mi)	MPC · JPL
6224 El Goresy	1981 EK_{8}	El Goresy	March 1, 1981	Siding Spring	S. J. Bus	·	3.6 km (2.2 mi)	MPC · JPL
6225 Hiroko	1981 EK_{12}	Hiroko	March 1, 1981	Siding Spring	S. J. Bus	·	2.1 km (1.3 mi)	MPC · JPL
6226 Paulwarren	1981 EY_{18}	Paulwarren	March 2, 1981	Siding Spring	S. J. Bus	·	3.2 km (2.0 mi)	MPC · JPL
6227 Alanrubin	1981 EQ_{42}	Alanrubin	March 2, 1981	Siding Spring	S. J. Bus	THM	11 km (6.8 mi)	MPC · JPL
6228 Yonezawa	1982 BA	Yonezawa	January 17, 1982	Tōkai	T. Furuta	EUN	6.7 km (4.2 mi)	MPC · JPL
6229 Tursachan	1983 VN_{7}	Tursachan	November 4, 1983	Anderson Mesa	B. A. Skiff	THM	12 km (7.5 mi)	MPC · JPL
6230 Fram	1984 SG_{1}	Fram	September 27, 1984	Kleť	Z. Vávrová	HOF	13 km (8.1 mi)	MPC · JPL
6231 Hundertwasser	1985 FH	Hundertwasser	March 20, 1985	Kleť	A. Mrkos	·	5.5 km (3.4 mi)	MPC · JPL
6232 Zubitskia	1985 SJ_{3}	Zubitskia	September 19, 1985	Nauchnij	N. S. Chernykh, L. I. Chernykh	·	6.0 km (3.7 mi)	MPC · JPL
6233 Kimura	1986 CG	Kimura	February 8, 1986	Karasuyama	S. Inoda, T. Urata	DOR	9.9 km (6.2 mi)	MPC · JPL
6234 Sheilawolfman	1986 SF	Sheilawolfman	September 30, 1986	Kleť	Z. Vávrová	·	4.7 km (2.9 mi)	MPC · JPL
6235 Burney	1987 VB	Burney	November 14, 1987	Kushiro	S. Ueda, H. Kaneda	·	4.1 km (2.5 mi)	MPC · JPL
6236 Mallard	1988 WF	Mallard	November 29, 1988	Oohira	Oohira	THM · slow	13 km (8.1 mi)	MPC · JPL
6237 Chikushi	1989 CV	Chikushi	February 4, 1989	Geisei	T. Seki	3:2	37 km (23 mi)	MPC · JPL
6238 Septimaclark	1989 NM	Septimaclark	July 2, 1989	Palomar	E. F. Helin	·	7.8 km (4.8 mi)	MPC · JPL
6239 Minos	1989 QF	Minos	August 31, 1989	Palomar	C. S. Shoemaker, E. M. Shoemaker	APO · PHA	680 m (2,230 ft)	MPC · JPL
6240 Lucretius Carus	1989 SL_{1}	Lucretius Carus	September 26, 1989	La Silla	E. W. Elst	·	4.7 km (2.9 mi)	MPC · JPL
6241 Galante	1989 TG	Galante	October 4, 1989	Bologna	San Vittore	EOS	12 km (7.5 mi)	MPC · JPL
6242	1990 OJ_{2}	—	July 29, 1990	Palomar	H. E. Holt	·	3.8 km (2.4 mi)	MPC · JPL
6243 Yoder	1990 OT_{3}	Yoder	July 27, 1990	Palomar	H. E. Holt	·	3.9 km (2.4 mi)	MPC · JPL
6244 Okamoto	1990 QF	Okamoto	August 20, 1990	Geisei	T. Seki	moon	5.8 km (3.6 mi)	MPC · JPL
6245 Ikufumi	1990 SO_{4}	Ikufumi	September 27, 1990	Oohira	T. Urata	moon	8.1 km (5.0 mi)	MPC · JPL
6246 Komurotoru	1990 VX_{2}	Komurotoru	November 13, 1990	Kitami	T. Fujii, K. Watanabe	·	5.6 km (3.5 mi)	MPC · JPL
6247 Amanogawa	1990 WY_{3}	Amanogawa	November 21, 1990	Kitami	K. Endate, K. Watanabe	·	6.7 km (4.2 mi)	MPC · JPL
6248 Bardon	1991 BM_{2}	Bardon	January 17, 1991	Kleť	Z. Vávrová	THM	11 km (6.8 mi)	MPC · JPL
6249 Jennifer	1991 JF_{1}	Jennifer	May 7, 1991	Palomar	E. F. Helin	H	5.5 km (3.4 mi)	MPC · JPL
6250 Saekohayashi	1991 VX_{1}	Saekohayashi	November 2, 1991	Palomar	E. F. Helin	H	3.1 km (1.9 mi)	MPC · JPL
6251 Setsuko	1992 DB	Setsuko	February 25, 1992	Susono	M. Akiyama, T. Furuta	·	5.7 km (3.5 mi)	MPC · JPL
6252 Montevideo	1992 EV_{11}	Montevideo	March 6, 1992	La Silla	UESAC	KOR	6.7 km (4.2 mi)	MPC · JPL
6253	1992 FJ	—	March 24, 1992	Kushiro	S. Ueda, H. Kaneda	·	4.1 km (2.5 mi)	MPC · JPL
6254	1993 UM_{3}	—	October 20, 1993	Kushiro	S. Ueda, H. Kaneda	EOS	12 km (7.5 mi)	MPC · JPL
6255 Kuma	1994 XT	Kuma	December 5, 1994	Kuma Kogen	A. Nakamura	·	17 km (11 mi)	MPC · JPL
6256 Canova	4063 P-L	Canova	September 24, 1960	Palomar	C. J. van Houten, I. van Houten-Groeneveld, T. Gehrels	·	3.1 km (1.9 mi)	MPC · JPL
6257 Thorvaldsen	4098 T-1	Thorvaldsen	March 26, 1971	Palomar	C. J. van Houten, I. van Houten-Groeneveld, T. Gehrels	·	4.3 km (2.7 mi)	MPC · JPL
6258 Rodin	3070 T-2	Rodin	September 30, 1973	Palomar	C. J. van Houten, I. van Houten-Groeneveld, T. Gehrels	·	4.0 km (2.5 mi)	MPC · JPL
6259 Maillol	3236 T-2	Maillol	September 30, 1973	Palomar	C. J. van Houten, I. van Houten-Groeneveld, T. Gehrels	·	4.5 km (2.8 mi)	MPC · JPL
6260 Kelsey	1949 PN	Kelsey	August 2, 1949	Heidelberg	K. Reinmuth	EUN	11 km (6.8 mi)	MPC · JPL
6261 Chione	1976 WC	Chione	November 30, 1976	La Silla	H.-E. Schuster	·	5.5 km (3.4 mi)	MPC · JPL
6262 Javid	1978 RZ	Javid	September 1, 1978	Nauchnij	N. S. Chernykh	KOR	7.8 km (4.8 mi)	MPC · JPL
6263 Druckmüller	1980 PX	Druckmüller	August 6, 1980	Kleť	Z. Vávrová	·	3.2 km (2.0 mi)	MPC · JPL
6264	1980 SQ	—	September 29, 1980	Kleť	Z. Vávrová	·	4.3 km (2.7 mi)	MPC · JPL
6265	1985 TW_{3}	—	October 11, 1985	Palomar	Fric, T. F., Gilbrech, R. J.	moon	5.0 km (3.1 mi)	MPC · JPL
6266 Letzel	1986 TB_{3}	Letzel	October 4, 1986	Kleť	A. Mrkos	(2076)	4.7 km (2.9 mi)	MPC · JPL
6267 Rozhen	1987 SO_{9}	Rozhen	September 20, 1987	Smolyan	E. W. Elst	·	4.1 km (2.5 mi)	MPC · JPL
6268 Versailles	1990 SS_{5}	Versailles	September 22, 1990	La Silla	E. W. Elst	·	3.6 km (2.2 mi)	MPC · JPL
6269 Kawasaki	1990 UJ	Kawasaki	October 20, 1990	Oohira	T. Urata	V	3.6 km (2.2 mi)	MPC · JPL
6270 Kabukuri	1991 BD	Kabukuri	January 18, 1991	Karasuyama	S. Inoda, T. Urata	V	3.4 km (2.1 mi)	MPC · JPL
6271 Farmer	1991 NF	Farmer	July 9, 1991	Palomar	E. F. Helin	H · slow	5.6 km (3.5 mi)	MPC · JPL
6272	1992 EB	—	March 2, 1992	Kushiro	S. Ueda, H. Kaneda	·	3.5 km (2.2 mi)	MPC · JPL
6273 Kiruna	1992 ER_{31}	Kiruna	March 1, 1992	La Silla	UESAC	·	6.9 km (4.3 mi)	MPC · JPL
6274 Taizaburo	1992 FV	Taizaburo	March 23, 1992	Kitami	K. Endate, K. Watanabe	·	4.9 km (3.0 mi)	MPC · JPL
6275 Kiryu	1993 VQ	Kiryu	November 14, 1993	Oizumi	T. Kobayashi	KOR	7.0 km (4.3 mi)	MPC · JPL
6276 Kurohone	1994 AB	Kurohone	January 1, 1994	Oizumi	T. Kobayashi	KOR	7.0 km (4.3 mi)	MPC · JPL
6277 Siok	1949 QC_{1}	Siok	August 24, 1949	Flagstaff	H. L. Giclas, Schaldach, R. D.	·	3.9 km (2.4 mi)	MPC · JPL
6278 Ametkhan	1971 TF	Ametkhan	October 10, 1971	Nauchnij	B. A. Burnasheva	NYS ·	8.9 km (5.5 mi)	MPC · JPL
6279	1977 UO_{5}	—	October 18, 1977	Palomar	Faul, K. L.	THM	17 km (11 mi)	MPC · JPL
6280 Sicardy	1980 RJ	Sicardy	September 2, 1980	Anderson Mesa	E. Bowell	·	4.3 km (2.7 mi)	MPC · JPL
6281 Strnad	1980 SD	Strnad	September 16, 1980	Kleť	A. Mrkos	EUN	7.8 km (4.8 mi)	MPC · JPL
6282 Edwelda	1980 TS_{4}	Edwelda	October 9, 1980	Palomar	C. S. Shoemaker	·	5.4 km (3.4 mi)	MPC · JPL
6283 Menghuazhu	1980 VX_{1}	Menghuazhu	November 6, 1980	Nanking	Purple Mountain	DOR	11 km (6.8 mi)	MPC · JPL
6284 Borisivanov	1981 EM_{19}	Borisivanov	March 2, 1981	Siding Spring	S. J. Bus	KOR	7.3 km (4.5 mi)	MPC · JPL
6285 Ingram	1981 EA_{26}	Ingram	March 2, 1981	Siding Spring	S. J. Bus	·	4.6 km (2.9 mi)	MPC · JPL
6286	1983 EU	—	March 10, 1983	Anderson Mesa	E. Barr	·	4.6 km (2.9 mi)	MPC · JPL
6287 Lenham	1984 AR	Lenham	January 8, 1984	Anderson Mesa	E. Bowell	THM	11 km (6.8 mi)	MPC · JPL
6288 Fouts	1984 ER_{1}	Fouts	March 2, 1984	La Silla	H. Debehogne	THM	10 km (6.2 mi)	MPC · JPL
6289 Lanusei	1984 HP_{1}	Lanusei	April 28, 1984	La Silla	W. Ferreri, V. Zappalà	THM	12 km (7.5 mi)	MPC · JPL
6290	1985 CA_{2}	—	February 12, 1985	La Silla	H. Debehogne	·	5.4 km (3.4 mi)	MPC · JPL
6291 Renzetti	1985 TM_{1}	Renzetti	October 15, 1985	Anderson Mesa	E. Bowell	·	4.9 km (3.0 mi)	MPC · JPL
6292	1986 QQ_{2}	—	August 28, 1986	La Silla	H. Debehogne	V	3.9 km (2.4 mi)	MPC · JPL
6293 Oberpfalz	1987 WV_{1}	Oberpfalz	November 26, 1987	Tautenburg Observatory	F. Börngen	·	2.6 km (1.6 mi)	MPC · JPL
6294 Czerny	1988 CX_{1}	Czerny	February 11, 1988	La Silla	E. W. Elst	·	4.1 km (2.5 mi)	MPC · JPL
6295 Schmoll	1988 CF_{3}	Schmoll	February 11, 1988	La Silla	E. W. Elst	·	9.1 km (5.7 mi)	MPC · JPL
6296 Cleveland	1988 NC	Cleveland	July 12, 1988	Palomar	E. F. Helin	H	3.2 km (2.0 mi)	MPC · JPL
6297	1988 VZ_{1}	—	November 2, 1988	Kushiro	S. Ueda, H. Kaneda	THM ·	16 km (9.9 mi)	MPC · JPL
6298 Sawaoka	1988 XC	Sawaoka	December 1, 1988	Chiyoda	T. Kojima	·	7.4 km (4.6 mi)	MPC · JPL
6299 Reizoutoyoko	1988 XQ_{1}	Reizoutoyoko	December 5, 1988	Yorii	M. Arai, H. Mori	KOR	9.0 km (5.6 mi)	MPC · JPL
6300 Hosamu	1988 YB	Hosamu	December 30, 1988	Okutama	Hioki, T., N. Kawasato	THM	13 km (8.1 mi)	MPC · JPL

== 6301–6400 ==
back to top

Designation			Discovery			Properties		Ref
Permanent	Provisional	Named after	Date	Site	Discoverer(s)	Category	Diam.	Ref
6301 Bohumilruprecht	1989 BR_{1}	Bohumilruprecht	January 29, 1989	Kleť	Z. Vávrová	THM	18 km (11 mi)	MPC · JPL
6302 Tengukogen	1989 CF	Tengukogen	February 2, 1989	Geisei	T. Seki	EUN	5.3 km (3.3 mi)	MPC · JPL
6303	1989 EL_{2}	—	March 12, 1989	Kushiro	S. Ueda, H. Kaneda	(254)	3.6 km (2.2 mi)	MPC · JPL
6304 Josephus Flavius	1989 GT_{3}	Josephus Flavius	April 2, 1989	La Silla	E. W. Elst	·	4.2 km (2.6 mi)	MPC · JPL
6305 Helgoland	1989 GE_{8}	Helgoland	April 6, 1989	Tautenburg Observatory	F. Börngen	·	3.2 km (2.0 mi)	MPC · JPL
6306 Nishimura	1989 UL_{3}	Nishimura	October 30, 1989	Dynic	A. Sugie	·	16 km (9.9 mi)	MPC · JPL
6307 Maiztegui	1989 WL_{7}	Maiztegui	November 22, 1989	El Leoncito	Félix Aguilar Observatory	MAR	9.5 km (5.9 mi)	MPC · JPL
6308 Ebisuzaki	1990 BK	Ebisuzaki	January 17, 1990	Yatsugatake	Y. Kushida, O. Muramatsu	THM	10 km (6.2 mi)	MPC · JPL
6309 Elsschot	1990 EM_{3}	Elsschot	March 2, 1990	La Silla	E. W. Elst	EOS	11 km (6.8 mi)	MPC · JPL
6310 Jankonke	1990 KK	Jankonke	May 21, 1990	Palomar	E. F. Helin	H	3.7 km (2.3 mi)	MPC · JPL
6311 Porubčan	1990 RQ_{2}	Porubčan	September 15, 1990	Palomar	H. E. Holt	moon	4.8 km (3.0 mi)	MPC · JPL
6312 Robheinlein	1990 RH_{4}	Robheinlein	September 14, 1990	Palomar	H. E. Holt	(254)	3.6 km (2.2 mi)	MPC · JPL
6313 Tsurutani	1990 RC_{8}	Tsurutani	September 14, 1990	La Silla	H. Debehogne	·	2.7 km (1.7 mi)	MPC · JPL
6314 Reigber	1990 SQ_{16}	Reigber	September 17, 1990	Palomar	H. E. Holt	·	5.1 km (3.2 mi)	MPC · JPL
6315 Barabash	1990 TS	Barabash	October 11, 1990	Kushiro	S. Ueda, H. Kaneda	·	3.6 km (2.2 mi)	MPC · JPL
6316 Méndez	1990 TL_{6}	Méndez	October 9, 1990	Siding Spring	R. H. McNaught	·	3.5 km (2.2 mi)	MPC · JPL
6317 Dreyfus	1990 UP_{3}	Dreyfus	October 16, 1990	La Silla	E. W. Elst	·	5.6 km (3.5 mi)	MPC · JPL
6318 Cronkite	1990 WA	Cronkite	November 18, 1990	Palomar	E. F. Helin	(887)	1.4 km (0.87 mi)	MPC · JPL
6319 Beregovoj	1990 WJ_{3}	Beregovoj	November 19, 1990	La Silla	E. W. Elst	·	4.6 km (2.9 mi)	MPC · JPL
6320 Bremen	1991 AL_{3}	Bremen	January 15, 1991	Tautenburg Observatory	F. Börngen	NYS ·	10 km (6.2 mi)	MPC · JPL
6321 Namuratakao	1991 BV	Namuratakao	January 19, 1991	Dynic	A. Sugie	EUN	7.7 km (4.8 mi)	MPC · JPL
6322	1991 CQ	—	February 10, 1991	Siding Spring	R. H. McNaught	(887)	1.8 km (1.1 mi)	MPC · JPL
6323 Karoji	1991 CY_{1}	Karoji	February 14, 1991	Kitami	K. Endate, K. Watanabe	·	5.5 km (3.4 mi)	MPC · JPL
6324 Kejonuma	1991 DN_{1}	Kejonuma	February 23, 1991	Karasuyama	S. Inoda, T. Urata	·	7.5 km (4.7 mi)	MPC · JPL
6325	1991 EA_{1}	—	March 14, 1991	Yorii	M. Arai, H. Mori	CLO	12 km (7.5 mi)	MPC · JPL
6326 Idamiyoshi	1991 FJ_{1}	Idamiyoshi	March 18, 1991	Dynic	A. Sugie	EUN · moon	6.9 km (4.3 mi)	MPC · JPL
6327 Tijn	1991 GP_{1}	Tijn	April 9, 1991	Palomar	E. F. Helin	·	11 km (6.8 mi)	MPC · JPL
6328	1991 NL_{1}	—	July 12, 1991	Palomar	H. E. Holt	·	16 km (9.9 mi)	MPC · JPL
6329 Hikonejyo	1992 EU_{1}	Hikonejyo	March 12, 1992	Dynic	A. Sugie	·	5.6 km (3.5 mi)	MPC · JPL
6330 Koen	1992 FN	Koen	March 23, 1992	Kitami	K. Endate, K. Watanabe	·	3.2 km (2.0 mi)	MPC · JPL
6331	1992 FZ_{1}	—	March 28, 1992	Kushiro	S. Ueda, H. Kaneda	V	5.3 km (3.3 mi)	MPC · JPL
6332 Vorarlberg	1992 FP_{3}	Vorarlberg	March 30, 1992	Tautenburg Observatory	F. Börngen	·	12 km (7.5 mi)	MPC · JPL
6333 Helenejacq	1992 LG	Helenejacq	June 3, 1992	Palomar	G. J. Leonard	·	4.5 km (2.8 mi)	MPC · JPL
6334 Robleonard	1992 MM	Robleonard	June 27, 1992	Palomar	G. J. Leonard	·	5.0 km (3.1 mi)	MPC · JPL
6335 Nicolerappaport	1992 NR	Nicolerappaport	July 5, 1992	Palomar	E. F. Helin, J. Alu	EUN	6.0 km (3.7 mi)	MPC · JPL
6336 Dodo	1992 UU	Dodo	October 21, 1992	Kiyosato	S. Otomo	·	8.7 km (5.4 mi)	MPC · JPL
6337 Shiota	1992 UC_{4}	Shiota	October 26, 1992	Kitami	K. Endate, K. Watanabe	THM	14 km (8.7 mi)	MPC · JPL
6338 Isaosato	1992 UO_{4}	Isaosato	October 26, 1992	Kitami	K. Endate, K. Watanabe	·	23 km (14 mi)	MPC · JPL
6339 Giliberti	1993 SG	Giliberti	September 20, 1993	Colleverde	V. S. Casulli	·	5.9 km (3.7 mi)	MPC · JPL
6340 Kathmandu	1993 TF_{2}	Kathmandu	October 15, 1993	Kitami	K. Endate, K. Watanabe	(3460)	19 km (12 mi)	MPC · JPL
6341	1993 UN_{3}	—	October 20, 1993	Kushiro	S. Ueda, H. Kaneda	EOS	14 km (8.7 mi)	MPC · JPL
6342	1993 VG	—	November 7, 1993	Kushiro	S. Ueda, H. Kaneda	KOR	5.3 km (3.3 mi)	MPC · JPL
6343	1993 VK	—	November 7, 1993	Kushiro	S. Ueda, H. Kaneda	VER	21 km (13 mi)	MPC · JPL
6344	1993 VM	—	November 7, 1993	Kushiro	S. Ueda, H. Kaneda	·	4.9 km (3.0 mi)	MPC · JPL
6345 Hideo	1994 AX_{1}	Hideo	January 5, 1994	Kitami	K. Endate, K. Watanabe	·	14 km (8.7 mi)	MPC · JPL
6346 Syukumeguri	1995 AY	Syukumeguri	January 6, 1995	Oizumi	T. Kobayashi	·	19 km (12 mi)	MPC · JPL
6347	1995 BM_{4}	—	January 28, 1995	Kushiro	S. Ueda, H. Kaneda	·	5.4 km (3.4 mi)	MPC · JPL
6348	1995 CH_{1}	—	February 3, 1995	Kushiro	S. Ueda, H. Kaneda	·	4.7 km (2.9 mi)	MPC · JPL
6349 Acapulco	1995 CN_{1}	Acapulco	February 8, 1995	Ayashi Station	M. Koishikawa	ADE	20 km (12 mi)	MPC · JPL
6350 Schlüter	3526 P-L	Schlüter	October 17, 1960	Palomar	C. J. van Houten, I. van Houten-Groeneveld, T. Gehrels	·	22 km (14 mi)	MPC · JPL
6351 Neumann	4277 T-1	Neumann	March 26, 1971	Palomar	C. J. van Houten, I. van Houten-Groeneveld, T. Gehrels	·	17 km (11 mi)	MPC · JPL
6352 Schlaun	2400 T-3	Schlaun	October 16, 1977	Palomar	C. J. van Houten, I. van Houten-Groeneveld, T. Gehrels	·	4.3 km (2.7 mi)	MPC · JPL
6353 Semper	3107 T-3	Semper	October 16, 1977	Palomar	C. J. van Houten, I. van Houten-Groeneveld, T. Gehrels	THM	15 km (9.3 mi)	MPC · JPL
6354 Vangelis	1934 GA	Vangelis	April 3, 1934	Uccle	E. Delporte	·	7.6 km (4.7 mi)	MPC · JPL
6355 Univermoscow	1969 TX_{5}	Univermoscow	October 15, 1969	Nauchnij	L. I. Chernykh	(6355)	28 km (17 mi)	MPC · JPL
6356 Tairov	1976 QR	Tairov	August 26, 1976	Nauchnij	N. S. Chernykh	EUN	8.5 km (5.3 mi)	MPC · JPL
6357 Glushko	1976 SK_{3}	Glushko	September 24, 1976	Nauchnij	N. S. Chernykh	EOS	11 km (6.8 mi)	MPC · JPL
6358 Chertok	1977 AL_{1}	Chertok	January 13, 1977	Nauchnij	N. S. Chernykh	·	10 km (6.2 mi)	MPC · JPL
6359 Dubinin	1977 AZ_{1}	Dubinin	January 13, 1977	Nauchnij	N. S. Chernykh	·	32 km (20 mi)	MPC · JPL
6360	1978 UA_{7}	—	October 27, 1978	Palomar	C. M. Olmstead	·	5.8 km (3.6 mi)	MPC · JPL
6361 Koppel	1978 VL_{11}	Koppel	November 7, 1978	Palomar	E. F. Helin, S. J. Bus	·	3.6 km (2.2 mi)	MPC · JPL
6362 Tunis	1979 KO	Tunis	May 19, 1979	La Silla	R. M. West	·	23 km (14 mi)	MPC · JPL
6363 Doggett	1981 CB_{1}	Doggett	February 6, 1981	Anderson Mesa	E. Bowell	·	5.1 km (3.2 mi)	MPC · JPL
6364 Casarini	1981 ET	Casarini	March 5, 1981	La Silla	H. Debehogne, G. de Sanctis	·	11 km (6.8 mi)	MPC · JPL
6365 Nickschneider	1981 ES_{29}	Nickschneider	March 1, 1981	Siding Spring	S. J. Bus	·	12 km (7.5 mi)	MPC · JPL
6366 Rainerwieler	1981 UM_{22}	Rainerwieler	October 24, 1981	Palomar	S. J. Bus	·	15 km (9.3 mi)	MPC · JPL
6367	1982 FY_{2}	—	March 18, 1982	La Silla	H. Debehogne	·	4.3 km (2.7 mi)	MPC · JPL
6368 Richardmenendez	1983 RM_{3}	Richardmenendez	September 1, 1983	La Silla	H. Debehogne	·	4.4 km (2.7 mi)	MPC · JPL
6369	1983 UC	—	October 16, 1983	Kleť	Z. Vávrová	moon	3.7 km (2.3 mi)	MPC · JPL
6370 Malpais	1984 EY	Malpais	March 9, 1984	Anderson Mesa	B. A. Skiff	V	4.8 km (3.0 mi)	MPC · JPL
6371 Heinlein	1985 GS	Heinlein	April 15, 1985	Anderson Mesa	E. Bowell	·	21 km (13 mi)	MPC · JPL
6372 Walker	1985 JW_{1}	Walker	May 13, 1985	Palomar	C. S. Shoemaker, E. M. Shoemaker	·	42 km (26 mi)	MPC · JPL
6373 Stern	1986 EZ	Stern	March 5, 1986	Anderson Mesa	E. Bowell	EUN	9.3 km (5.8 mi)	MPC · JPL
6374 Beslan	1986 PY_{4}	Beslan	August 8, 1986	Nauchnij	L. I. Chernykh	VER	16 km (9.9 mi)	MPC · JPL
6375 Fredharris	1986 TB_{5}	Fredharris	October 1, 1986	Caussols	CERGA	THM	15 km (9.3 mi)	MPC · JPL
6376 Schamp	1987 KD_{1}	Schamp	May 29, 1987	Palomar	C. S. Shoemaker, E. M. Shoemaker	·	7.9 km (4.9 mi)	MPC · JPL
6377 Cagney	1987 ML_{1}	Cagney	June 25, 1987	Kleť	A. Mrkos	·	10 km (6.2 mi)	MPC · JPL
6378	1987 SE_{13}	—	September 27, 1987	La Silla	H. Debehogne	THM	13 km (8.1 mi)	MPC · JPL
6379 Vrba	1987 VA_{1}	Vrba	November 15, 1987	Kleť	A. Mrkos	·	15 km (9.3 mi)	MPC · JPL
6380 Gardel	1988 CG	Gardel	February 10, 1988	Yorii	M. Arai, H. Mori	·	3.0 km (1.9 mi)	MPC · JPL
6381 Toyama	1988 DO_{1}	Toyama	February 21, 1988	Kitami	T. Fujii, K. Watanabe	·	5.0 km (3.1 mi)	MPC · JPL
6382	1988 EL	—	March 14, 1988	Palomar	J. Alu	H	4.9 km (3.0 mi)	MPC · JPL
6383 Tokushima	1988 XU_{1}	Tokushima	December 12, 1988	Tokushima	M. Iwamoto, T. Furuta	EOS	15 km (9.3 mi)	MPC · JPL
6384 Kervin	1989 AM	Kervin	January 3, 1989	Palomar	E. F. Helin	H · moon	3.7 km (2.3 mi)	MPC · JPL
6385 Martindavid	1989 EC_{2}	Martindavid	March 5, 1989	Kleť	A. Mrkos	HYG	13 km (8.1 mi)	MPC · JPL
6386 Keithnoll	1989 NK_{1}	Keithnoll	July 10, 1989	Palomar	H. E. Holt	·	8.0 km (5.0 mi)	MPC · JPL
6387	1989 WC	—	November 19, 1989	Kushiro	S. Ueda, H. Kaneda	·	5.3 km (3.3 mi)	MPC · JPL
6388	1989 WL_{1}	—	November 25, 1989	Kushiro	S. Ueda, H. Kaneda	EUN	7.6 km (4.7 mi)	MPC · JPL
6389 Ogawa	1990 BX	Ogawa	January 21, 1990	Kitami	K. Endate, K. Watanabe	·	6.3 km (3.9 mi)	MPC · JPL
6390 Hirabayashi	1990 BG_{1}	Hirabayashi	January 26, 1990	Kitami	K. Endate, K. Watanabe	·	15 km (9.3 mi)	MPC · JPL
6391 Africano	1990 BN_{2}	Africano	January 21, 1990	Palomar	E. F. Helin	EUN	5.9 km (3.7 mi)	MPC · JPL
6392 Takashimizuno	1990 HR	Takashimizuno	April 29, 1990	Kani	Y. Mizuno, T. Furuta	URS	25 km (16 mi)	MPC · JPL
6393	1990 HM_{1}	—	April 29, 1990	Fujieda	Shiozawa, H., M. Kizawa	·	20 km (12 mi)	MPC · JPL
6394	1990 QM_{2}	—	August 22, 1990	Palomar	H. E. Holt	H	3.2 km (2.0 mi)	MPC · JPL
6395 Hilliard	1990 UE_{1}	Hilliard	October 21, 1990	Yatsugatake	Y. Kushida, O. Muramatsu	NYS	4.1 km (2.5 mi)	MPC · JPL
6396 Schleswig	1991 AO_{3}	Schleswig	January 15, 1991	Tautenburg Observatory	F. Börngen	·	3.6 km (2.2 mi)	MPC · JPL
6397	1991 BJ	—	January 17, 1991	Okutama	Hioki, T., Hayakawa, S.	·	6.2 km (3.9 mi)	MPC · JPL
6398 Timhunter	1991 CD_{1}	Timhunter	February 10, 1991	Palomar	C. S. Shoemaker, E. M. Shoemaker, D. H. Levy	PHO	5.5 km (3.4 mi)	MPC · JPL
6399 Harada	1991 GA	Harada	April 3, 1991	Geisei	T. Seki	·	5.8 km (3.6 mi)	MPC · JPL
6400 Georgealexander	1991 GQ_{1}	Georgealexander	April 10, 1991	Palomar	E. F. Helin	·	12 km (7.5 mi)	MPC · JPL

== 6401–6500 ==
back to top

Designation			Discovery			Properties		Ref
Permanent	Provisional	Named after	Date	Site	Discoverer(s)	Category	Diam.	Ref
6401 Röntgen	1991 GB_{2}	Röntgen	April 15, 1991	Palomar	C. S. Shoemaker, E. M. Shoemaker, D. H. Levy	EUN	7.9 km (4.9 mi)	MPC · JPL
6402 Holstein	1991 GQ_{10}	Holstein	April 9, 1991	Tautenburg Observatory	F. Börngen	·	8.6 km (5.3 mi)	MPC · JPL
6403 Steverin	1991 NU	Steverin	July 8, 1991	Palomar	E. F. Helin	MAR	6.9 km (4.3 mi)	MPC · JPL
6404 Vanavara	1991 PS_{6}	Vanavara	August 6, 1991	La Silla	E. W. Elst	·	17 km (11 mi)	MPC · JPL
6405 Komiyama	1992 HJ	Komiyama	April 30, 1992	Yatsugatake	Y. Kushida, O. Muramatsu	·	6.5 km (4.0 mi)	MPC · JPL
6406 Mikejura	1992 MJ	Mikejura	June 28, 1992	Palomar	H. E. Holt	·	4.1 km (2.5 mi)	MPC · JPL
6407	1992 PF_{2}	—	August 2, 1992	Palomar	H. E. Holt	·	4.4 km (2.7 mi)	MPC · JPL
6408 Saijo	1992 UT_{5}	Saijo	October 28, 1992	Kitami	K. Endate, K. Watanabe	KOR	11 km (6.8 mi)	MPC · JPL
6409	1992 VC	—	November 2, 1992	Uenohara	N. Kawasato	EUN	7.3 km (4.5 mi)	MPC · JPL
6410 Fujiwara	1992 WO_{4}	Fujiwara	November 29, 1992	Kiyosato	S. Otomo	DOR ·	15 km (9.3 mi)	MPC · JPL
6411 Tamaga	1993 TA	Tamaga	October 8, 1993	Siding Spring	R. H. McNaught	·	10 km (6.2 mi)	MPC · JPL
6412 Kaifu	1993 TL_{2}	Kaifu	October 15, 1993	Kitami	K. Endate, K. Watanabe	V	4.1 km (2.5 mi)	MPC · JPL
6413 Iye	1993 TJ_{3}	Iye	October 15, 1993	Kitami	K. Endate, K. Watanabe	·	5.3 km (3.3 mi)	MPC · JPL
6414 Mizunuma	1993 UX	Mizunuma	October 24, 1993	Oizumi	T. Kobayashi	·	4.4 km (2.7 mi)	MPC · JPL
6415	1993 VR_{3}	—	November 11, 1993	Kushiro	S. Ueda, H. Kaneda	HYG	16 km (9.9 mi)	MPC · JPL
6416 Nyukasayama	1993 VY_{3}	Nyukasayama	November 14, 1993	Nyukasa	M. Hirasawa, S. Suzuki	·	12 km (7.5 mi)	MPC · JPL
6417 Liberati	1993 XA	Liberati	December 4, 1993	Stroncone	A. Vagnozzi	(5)	5.7 km (3.5 mi)	MPC · JPL
6418 Hanamigahara	1993 XJ	Hanamigahara	December 8, 1993	Oizumi	T. Kobayashi	·	6.4 km (4.0 mi)	MPC · JPL
6419 Susono	1993 XX	Susono	December 7, 1993	Susono	M. Akiyama, T. Furuta	·	17 km (11 mi)	MPC · JPL
6420 Riheijyaya	1993 XG_{1}	Riheijyaya	December 14, 1993	Oizumi	T. Kobayashi	EOS	13 km (8.1 mi)	MPC · JPL
6421	1993 XS_{1}	—	December 6, 1993	Kushiro	S. Ueda, H. Kaneda	V	4.5 km (2.8 mi)	MPC · JPL
6422 Akagi	1994 CD_{1}	Akagi	February 7, 1994	Oizumi	T. Kobayashi	EUN	9.1 km (5.7 mi)	MPC · JPL
6423 Harunasan	1994 CP_{2}	Harunasan	February 13, 1994	Oizumi	T. Kobayashi	·	11 km (6.8 mi)	MPC · JPL
6424 Ando	1994 EN_{3}	Ando	March 14, 1994	Kitami	K. Endate, K. Watanabe	EOS · slow	11 km (6.8 mi)	MPC · JPL
6425	1994 WZ_{3}	—	November 28, 1994	Kushiro	S. Ueda, H. Kaneda	slow	11 km (6.8 mi)	MPC · JPL
6426 Vanýsek	1995 ED	Vanýsek	March 2, 1995	Kleť	M. Tichý	NYS	4.7 km (2.9 mi)	MPC · JPL
6427	1995 FY	—	March 28, 1995	Kushiro	S. Ueda, H. Kaneda	·	5.4 km (3.4 mi)	MPC · JPL
6428 Barlach	3513 P-L	Barlach	October 17, 1960	Palomar	C. J. van Houten, I. van Houten-Groeneveld, T. Gehrels	·	5.2 km (3.2 mi)	MPC · JPL
6429 Brâncuși	4050 T-1	Brâncuși	March 26, 1971	Palomar	C. J. van Houten, I. van Houten-Groeneveld, T. Gehrels	·	3.3 km (2.1 mi)	MPC · JPL
6430	1964 UP	—	October 30, 1964	Nanking	Purple Mountain	·	5.2 km (3.2 mi)	MPC · JPL
6431	1967 UT	—	October 30, 1967	Hamburg-Bergedorf	L. Kohoutek	·	5.2 km (3.2 mi)	MPC · JPL
6432 Temirkanov	1975 TR_{2}	Temirkanov	October 3, 1975	Nauchnij	L. I. Chernykh	·	21 km (13 mi)	MPC · JPL
6433 Enya	1978 WC	Enya	November 18, 1978	Kleť	A. Mrkos	·	7.4 km (4.6 mi)	MPC · JPL
6434 Jewitt	1981 OH	Jewitt	July 26, 1981	Anderson Mesa	E. Bowell	PHO	4.6 km (2.9 mi)	MPC · JPL
6435 Daveross	1984 DA	Daveross	February 24, 1984	Palomar	E. F. Helin, R. S. Dunbar	H	1.9 km (1.2 mi)	MPC · JPL
6436 Coco	1985 JX_{1}	Coco	May 13, 1985	Palomar	C. S. Shoemaker, E. M. Shoemaker	·	4.0 km (2.5 mi)	MPC · JPL
6437 Stroganov	1987 QS_{7}	Stroganov	August 28, 1987	La Silla	E. W. Elst	KOR	7.6 km (4.7 mi)	MPC · JPL
6438 Suárez	1988 BS_{3}	Suárez	January 18, 1988	La Silla	H. Debehogne	·	3.0 km (1.9 mi)	MPC · JPL
6439 Tirol	1988 CV	Tirol	February 13, 1988	Tautenburg Observatory	F. Börngen	·	17 km (11 mi)	MPC · JPL
6440 Ransome	1988 RA_{2}	Ransome	September 8, 1988	Kleť	A. Mrkos	NYS	4.6 km (2.9 mi)	MPC · JPL
6441 Milenajesenská	1988 RR_{2}	Milenajesenská	September 9, 1988	Kleť	A. Mrkos	NYS	4.8 km (3.0 mi)	MPC · JPL
6442 Salzburg	1988 RU_{3}	Salzburg	September 8, 1988	Tautenburg Observatory	F. Börngen	·	7.8 km (4.8 mi)	MPC · JPL
6443 Harpalion	1988 RH_{12}	Harpalion	September 14, 1988	Cerro Tololo	S. J. Bus	L5	20 km (12 mi)	MPC · JPL
6444 Ryuzin	1989 WW	Ryuzin	November 20, 1989	Toyota	K. Suzuki, T. Urata	·	4.0 km (2.5 mi)	MPC · JPL
6445 Bellmore	1990 FS_{1}	Bellmore	March 23, 1990	Palomar	E. F. Helin	EUN	7.3 km (4.5 mi)	MPC · JPL
6446 Lomberg	1990 QL	Lomberg	August 18, 1990	Palomar	E. F. Helin	·	2.0 km (1.2 mi)	MPC · JPL
6447 Terrycole	1990 TO_{1}	Terrycole	October 14, 1990	Palomar	E. F. Helin	H	2.7 km (1.7 mi)	MPC · JPL
6448	1991 CW	—	February 8, 1991	Toyota	K. Suzuki, T. Urata	·	4.1 km (2.5 mi)	MPC · JPL
6449 Kudara	1991 CL_{1}	Kudara	February 7, 1991	Geisei	T. Seki	·	3.7 km (2.3 mi)	MPC · JPL
6450 Masahikohayashi	1991 GV_{1}	Masahikohayashi	April 9, 1991	Palomar	E. F. Helin	·	6.0 km (3.7 mi)	MPC · JPL
6451 Kärnten	1991 GP_{10}	Kärnten	April 9, 1991	Tautenburg Observatory	F. Börngen	·	5.6 km (3.5 mi)	MPC · JPL
6452 Johneuller	1991 HA	Johneuller	April 17, 1991	Foggy Bottom	T. J. Balonek	·	7.8 km (4.8 mi)	MPC · JPL
6453	1991 NY	—	July 13, 1991	Palomar	H. E. Holt	·	8.5 km (5.3 mi)	MPC · JPL
6454	1991 UG_{1}	—	October 29, 1991	Siding Spring	R. H. McNaught	·	9.5 km (5.9 mi)	MPC · JPL
6455	1992 HE	—	April 25, 1992	Siding Spring	R. H. McNaught	APO +1 km (0.62 mi)	4.6 km (2.9 mi)	MPC · JPL
6456 Golombek	1992 OM	Golombek	July 27, 1992	Palomar	E. F. Helin, K. J. Lawrence	AMO +1 km (0.62 mi)	2.2 km (1.4 mi)	MPC · JPL
6457 Kremsmünster	1992 RT	Kremsmünster	September 2, 1992	Tautenburg Observatory	L. D. Schmadel, F. Börngen	KOR	7.0 km (4.3 mi)	MPC · JPL
6458 Nouda	1992 TD_{1}	Nouda	October 2, 1992	Geisei	T. Seki	MAR	7.5 km (4.7 mi)	MPC · JPL
6459 Hidesan	1992 UY_{5}	Hidesan	October 28, 1992	Kitami	K. Endate, K. Watanabe	EOS	11 km (6.8 mi)	MPC · JPL
6460 Bassano	1992 UK_{6}	Bassano	October 26, 1992	Bassano Bresciano	Quadri, U., Strabla, L.	·	4.3 km (2.7 mi)	MPC · JPL
6461 Adam	1993 VB_{5}	Adam	November 4, 1993	Siding Spring	R. H. McNaught	H	2.6 km (1.6 mi)	MPC · JPL
6462 Myougi	1994 AF_{2}	Myougi	January 9, 1994	Oizumi	T. Kobayashi	·	21 km (13 mi)	MPC · JPL
6463 Isoda	1994 AG_{3}	Isoda	January 13, 1994	Kitami	K. Endate, K. Watanabe	EUN	11 km (6.8 mi)	MPC · JPL
6464 Kaburaki	1994 CK	Kaburaki	February 1, 1994	Yatsugatake	Y. Kushida, O. Muramatsu	EOS	13 km (8.1 mi)	MPC · JPL
6465 Zvezdotchet	1995 EP	Zvezdotchet	March 3, 1995	Zelenchukskaya	T. V. Krjačko	ADE	15 km (9.3 mi)	MPC · JPL
6466 Drewesquivel	1979 MU_{8}	Drewesquivel	June 25, 1979	Siding Spring	E. F. Helin, S. J. Bus	EUN	5.4 km (3.4 mi)	MPC · JPL
6467 Prilepina	1979 TS_{2}	Prilepina	October 14, 1979	Nauchnij	N. S. Chernykh	·	17 km (11 mi)	MPC · JPL
6468 Welzenbach	1981 ED_{19}	Welzenbach	March 2, 1981	Siding Spring	S. J. Bus	·	6.7 km (4.2 mi)	MPC · JPL
6469 Armstrong	1982 PC	Armstrong	August 14, 1982	Kleť	A. Mrkos	·	3.7 km (2.3 mi)	MPC · JPL
6470 Aldrin	1982 RO_{1}	Aldrin	September 14, 1982	Kleť	A. Mrkos	·	3.7 km (2.3 mi)	MPC · JPL
6471 Collins	1983 EB_{1}	Collins	March 4, 1983	Kleť	A. Mrkos	NYS ·	9.0 km (5.6 mi)	MPC · JPL
6472 Rosema	1985 TL	Rosema	October 15, 1985	Anderson Mesa	E. Bowell	·	13 km (8.1 mi)	MPC · JPL
6473 Winkler	1986 GM	Winkler	April 9, 1986	Anderson Mesa	E. Bowell	·	12 km (7.5 mi)	MPC · JPL
6474 Choate	1987 SG_{1}	Choate	September 21, 1987	Anderson Mesa	E. Bowell	·	8.7 km (5.4 mi)	MPC · JPL
6475 Refugium	1987 SZ_{6}	Refugium	September 29, 1987	Zimmerwald	P. Wild	·	30 km (19 mi)	MPC · JPL
6476	1987 VT	—	November 15, 1987	Kleť	Z. Vávrová	WAT	14 km (8.7 mi)	MPC · JPL
6477	1988 AE_{5}	—	January 14, 1988	La Silla	H. Debehogne	EOS	11 km (6.8 mi)	MPC · JPL
6478 Gault	1988 JC_{1}	Gault	May 12, 1988	Palomar	C. S. Shoemaker, E. M. Shoemaker	PHO	3.8 km (2.4 mi)	MPC · JPL
6479 Leoconnolly	1988 LC	Leoconnolly	June 15, 1988	Palomar	E. F. Helin	·	15 km (9.3 mi)	MPC · JPL
6480 Scarlatti	1988 PM_{1}	Scarlatti	August 12, 1988	Haute-Provence	E. W. Elst	NYS	3.6 km (2.2 mi)	MPC · JPL
6481 Tenzing	1988 RH_{2}	Tenzing	September 9, 1988	Kleť	A. Mrkos	·	4.5 km (2.8 mi)	MPC · JPL
6482 Steiermark	1989 AF_{7}	Steiermark	January 10, 1989	Tautenburg Observatory	F. Börngen	THM	9.5 km (5.9 mi)	MPC · JPL
6483 Nikolajvasilʹev	1990 EO_{4}	Nikolajvasilʹev	March 2, 1990	La Silla	E. W. Elst	(5)	4.5 km (2.8 mi)	MPC · JPL
6484 Barthibbs	1990 FT_{1}	Barthibbs	March 23, 1990	Palomar	E. F. Helin	·	7.6 km (4.7 mi)	MPC · JPL
6485 Wendeesther	1990 UR_{1}	Wendeesther	October 25, 1990	Palomar	C. S. Shoemaker, E. M. Shoemaker, D. H. Levy	H	3.4 km (2.1 mi)	MPC · JPL
6486 Anitahill	1991 FO	Anitahill	March 17, 1991	Palomar	E. F. Helin	·	3.3 km (2.1 mi)	MPC · JPL
6487 Tonyspear	1991 GA_{1}	Tonyspear	April 8, 1991	Palomar	E. F. Helin	·	7.4 km (4.6 mi)	MPC · JPL
6488 Drebach	1991 GU_{9}	Drebach	April 10, 1991	Tautenburg Observatory	F. Börngen	·	9.1 km (5.7 mi)	MPC · JPL
6489 Golevka	1991 JX	Golevka	May 10, 1991	Palomar	E. F. Helin	APO · (887) · PHA	530 m (1,740 ft)	MPC · JPL
6490	1991 NR_{2}	—	July 12, 1991	Palomar	H. E. Holt	·	5.1 km (3.2 mi)	MPC · JPL
6491	1991 OA	—	July 16, 1991	Palomar	H. E. Holt	AMO · (887) · PHA	640 m (2,100 ft)	MPC · JPL
6492	1991 OH_{1}	—	July 18, 1991	La Silla	H. Debehogne	KOR	8.3 km (5.2 mi)	MPC · JPL
6493 Cathybennett	1992 CA	Cathybennett	February 2, 1992	Palomar	E. F. Helin	H	3.2 km (2.0 mi)	MPC · JPL
6494	1992 NM	—	July 8, 1992	Kiyosato	S. Otomo	·	4.8 km (3.0 mi)	MPC · JPL
6495	1992 UB_{1}	—	October 19, 1992	Kushiro	S. Ueda, H. Kaneda	·	5.3 km (3.3 mi)	MPC · JPL
6496 Kazuko	1992 UG_{2}	Kazuko	October 19, 1992	Kitami	K. Endate, K. Watanabe	EUN	7.2 km (4.5 mi)	MPC · JPL
6497 Yamasaki	1992 UR_{3}	Yamasaki	October 27, 1992	Geisei	T. Seki	·	3.4 km (2.1 mi)	MPC · JPL
6498 Ko	1992 UJ_{4}	Ko	October 26, 1992	Kitami	K. Endate, K. Watanabe	slow	5.1 km (3.2 mi)	MPC · JPL
6499 Michiko	1992 UV_{6}	Michiko	October 27, 1992	Nyukasa	M. Hirasawa, S. Suzuki	GEF	8.9 km (5.5 mi)	MPC · JPL
6500 Kodaira	1993 ET	Kodaira	March 15, 1993	Kitami	K. Endate, K. Watanabe	·	9.5 km (5.9 mi)	MPC · JPL

== 6501–6600 ==
back to top

Designation			Discovery			Properties		Ref
Permanent	Provisional	Named after	Date	Site	Discoverer(s)	Category	Diam.	Ref
6501 Isonzo	1993 XD	Isonzo	December 5, 1993	Farra d'Isonzo	Farra d'Isonzo	V	2.5 km (1.6 mi)	MPC · JPL
6502	1993 XR_{1}	—	December 6, 1993	Kushiro	S. Ueda, H. Kaneda	·	4.9 km (3.0 mi)	MPC · JPL
6503	1994 CP	—	February 4, 1994	Kushiro	S. Ueda, H. Kaneda	·	9.7 km (6.0 mi)	MPC · JPL
6504 Lehmbruck	4630 P-L	Lehmbruck	September 24, 1960	Palomar	C. J. van Houten, I. van Houten-Groeneveld, T. Gehrels	·	5.4 km (3.4 mi)	MPC · JPL
6505 Muzzio	1976 AH	Muzzio	January 3, 1976	El Leoncito	Félix Aguilar Observatory	·	16 km (9.9 mi)	MPC · JPL
6506 Klausheide	1978 EN_{10}	Klausheide	March 15, 1978	Palomar	S. J. Bus	·	3.5 km (2.2 mi)	MPC · JPL
6507	1982 QD	—	August 18, 1982	Kleť	Z. Vávrová	·	3.4 km (2.1 mi)	MPC · JPL
6508 Rolčík	1982 QM	Rolčík	August 22, 1982	Kleť	A. Mrkos	·	12 km (7.5 mi)	MPC · JPL
6509 Giovannipratesi	1983 CQ_{3}	Giovannipratesi	February 12, 1983	La Silla	H. Debehogne, G. de Sanctis	DOR	15 km (9.3 mi)	MPC · JPL
6510 Tarry	1987 DF	Tarry	February 23, 1987	Palomar	C. S. Shoemaker, E. M. Shoemaker	PHO	6.7 km (4.2 mi)	MPC · JPL
6511 Furmanov	1987 QR_{11}	Furmanov	August 27, 1987	Nauchnij	L. I. Chernykh	·	9.4 km (5.8 mi)	MPC · JPL
6512 de Bergh	1987 SR_{1}	de Bergh	September 21, 1987	Anderson Mesa	E. Bowell	·	5.2 km (3.2 mi)	MPC · JPL
6513	1987 UW_{1}	—	October 28, 1987	Kushiro	S. Ueda, H. Kaneda	·	5.5 km (3.4 mi)	MPC · JPL
6514 Torahiko	1987 WY	Torahiko	November 25, 1987	Geisei	T. Seki	·	7.6 km (4.7 mi)	MPC · JPL
6515 Giannigalli	1988 MG	Giannigalli	June 16, 1988	Palomar	E. F. Helin	·	4.1 km (2.5 mi)	MPC · JPL
6516 Gruss	1988 TC_{2}	Gruss	October 3, 1988	Kleť	A. Mrkos	·	6.2 km (3.9 mi)	MPC · JPL
6517 Buzzi	1990 BW	Buzzi	January 21, 1990	Palomar	E. F. Helin	H	2.7 km (1.7 mi)	MPC · JPL
6518 Vernon	1990 FR	Vernon	March 23, 1990	Palomar	E. F. Helin	·	13 km (8.1 mi)	MPC · JPL
6519 Giono	1991 CX_{2}	Giono	February 12, 1991	Haute-Provence	E. W. Elst	·	4.6 km (2.9 mi)	MPC · JPL
6520 Sugawa	1991 HH	Sugawa	April 16, 1991	Kiyosato	S. Otomo, O. Muramatsu	·	6.7 km (4.2 mi)	MPC · JPL
6521 Pina	1991 LC_{1}	Pina	June 15, 1991	Palomar	E. F. Helin	·	4.4 km (2.7 mi)	MPC · JPL
6522 Aci	1991 NQ	Aci	July 9, 1991	Palomar	E. F. Helin	PHO	6.1 km (3.8 mi)	MPC · JPL
6523 Clube	1991 TC	Clube	October 1, 1991	Siding Spring	R. H. McNaught	·	3.7 km (2.3 mi)	MPC · JPL
6524 Baalke	1992 AO	Baalke	January 9, 1992	Palomar	E. F. Helin	PHO	6.3 km (3.9 mi)	MPC · JPL
6525 Ocastron	1992 SQ_{2}	Ocastron	September 20, 1992	Wrightwood	Child, J. B., Fisch, G.	·	3.5 km (2.2 mi)	MPC · JPL
6526 Matogawa	1992 TY	Matogawa	October 1, 1992	Kitami	K. Endate, K. Watanabe	·	5.0 km (3.1 mi)	MPC · JPL
6527 Takashiito	1992 UF_{6}	Takashiito	October 31, 1992	Yakiimo	Natori, A., T. Urata	·	4.7 km (2.9 mi)	MPC · JPL
6528 Boden	1993 FL_{24}	Boden	March 21, 1993	La Silla	UESAC	·	4.0 km (2.5 mi)	MPC · JPL
6529 Rhoads	1993 XR_{2}	Rhoads	December 14, 1993	Palomar	Palomar	·	4.3 km (2.7 mi)	MPC · JPL
6530 Adry	1994 GW	Adry	April 12, 1994	Colleverde	V. S. Casulli	EUN	6.5 km (4.0 mi)	MPC · JPL
6531 Subashiri	1994 YY	Subashiri	December 28, 1994	Oizumi	T. Kobayashi	THM ·	12 km (7.5 mi)	MPC · JPL
6532 Scarfe	1995 AC	Scarfe	January 4, 1995	Climenhaga	D. D. Balam	·	12 km (7.5 mi)	MPC · JPL
6533 Giuseppina	1995 DM_{1}	Giuseppina	February 24, 1995	Catalina Station	C. W. Hergenrother	HNS	7.7 km (4.8 mi)	MPC · JPL
6534 Carriepeterson	1995 DT_{1}	Carriepeterson	February 24, 1995	Catalina Station	T. B. Spahr	·	13 km (8.1 mi)	MPC · JPL
6535 Archipenko	3535 P-L	Archipenko	October 17, 1960	Palomar	C. J. van Houten, I. van Houten-Groeneveld, T. Gehrels	PHO	9.0 km (5.6 mi)	MPC · JPL
6536 Vysochinska	1977 NK	Vysochinska	July 14, 1977	Nauchnij	N. S. Chernykh	·	6.8 km (4.2 mi)	MPC · JPL
6537 Adamovich	1979 QK_{6}	Adamovich	August 19, 1979	Nauchnij	N. S. Chernykh	·	4.3 km (2.7 mi)	MPC · JPL
6538 Muraviov	1981 SA_{5}	Muraviov	September 25, 1981	Nauchnij	L. I. Chernykh	KOR	8.3 km (5.2 mi)	MPC · JPL
6539 Nohavica	1982 QG	Nohavica	August 19, 1982	Kleť	Z. Vávrová	·	8.6 km (5.3 mi)	MPC · JPL
6540 Stepling	1982 SL_{1}	Stepling	September 16, 1982	Kleť	A. Mrkos	·	5.2 km (3.2 mi)	MPC · JPL
6541 Yuan	1984 DY	Yuan	February 26, 1984	La Silla	H. Debehogne	THM	14 km (8.7 mi)	MPC · JPL
6542 Jacquescousteau	1985 CH_{1}	Jacquescousteau	February 15, 1985	Kleť	A. Mrkos	·	8.9 km (5.5 mi)	MPC · JPL
6543 Senna	1985 TP_{3}	Senna	October 11, 1985	Palomar	C. S. Shoemaker, E. M. Shoemaker	·	3.4 km (2.1 mi)	MPC · JPL
6544 Stevendick	1986 SD	Stevendick	September 29, 1986	Kleť	Z. Vávrová	AGN	7.7 km (4.8 mi)	MPC · JPL
6545 Leitus	1986 TR_{6}	Leitus	October 5, 1986	Piwnice	M. Antal	L4	51 km (32 mi)	MPC · JPL
6546 Kaye	1987 DY_{4}	Kaye	February 24, 1987	Kleť	A. Mrkos	URS	22 km (14 mi)	MPC · JPL
6547 Vasilkarazin	1987 RO_{3}	Vasilkarazin	September 2, 1987	Nauchnij	L. I. Chernykh	·	3.7 km (2.3 mi)	MPC · JPL
6548 Maxalexander	1988 BO_{4}	Maxalexander	January 22, 1988	La Silla	H. Debehogne	EOS	13 km (8.1 mi)	MPC · JPL
6549 Skryabin	1988 PX_{1}	Skryabin	August 13, 1988	Haute-Provence	E. W. Elst	V	4.0 km (2.5 mi)	MPC · JPL
6550 Parléř	1988 VO_{5}	Parléř	November 4, 1988	Kleť	A. Mrkos	·	8.2 km (5.1 mi)	MPC · JPL
6551	1988 XP	—	December 5, 1988	Chiyoda	T. Kojima	·	8.0 km (5.0 mi)	MPC · JPL
6552 Higginson	1989 GH	Higginson	April 5, 1989	Palomar	E. F. Helin	ADE	9.4 km (5.8 mi)	MPC · JPL
6553 Seehaus	1989 GP_{6}	Seehaus	April 5, 1989	La Silla	Geffert, M.	·	10 km (6.2 mi)	MPC · JPL
6554 Takatsuguyoshida	1989 UO_{1}	Takatsuguyoshida	October 28, 1989	Kani	Y. Mizuno, T. Furuta	·	3.9 km (2.4 mi)	MPC · JPL
6555	1989 UU_{1}	—	October 29, 1989	Chiyoda	T. Kojima	·	6.5 km (4.0 mi)	MPC · JPL
6556 Arcimboldo	1989 YS_{6}	Arcimboldo	December 29, 1989	Kleť	A. Mrkos	(254)	5.0 km (3.1 mi)	MPC · JPL
6557 Yokonomura	1990 VR_{3}	Yokonomura	November 11, 1990	Minami-Oda	T. Nomura, K. Kawanishi	·	16 km (9.9 mi)	MPC · JPL
6558 Norizuki	1991 GZ	Norizuki	April 14, 1991	Kitami	K. Endate, K. Watanabe	·	3.9 km (2.4 mi)	MPC · JPL
6559 Nomura	1991 JP	Nomura	May 3, 1991	Minami-Oda	M. Sugano, K. Kawanishi	slow	9.4 km (5.8 mi)	MPC · JPL
6560 Pravdo	1991 NP	Pravdo	July 9, 1991	Palomar	E. F. Helin	PHO	7.4 km (4.6 mi)	MPC · JPL
6561 Gruppetta	1991 TC_{4}	Gruppetta	October 10, 1991	Palomar	K. J. Lawrence	EUN	6.2 km (3.9 mi)	MPC · JPL
6562 Takoyaki	1991 VR_{3}	Takoyaki	November 9, 1991	Kitami	M. Yanai, K. Watanabe	·	3.8 km (2.4 mi)	MPC · JPL
6563 Steinheim	1991 XZ_{5}	Steinheim	December 11, 1991	Tautenburg Observatory	F. Börngen	·	3.3 km (2.1 mi)	MPC · JPL
6564 Asher	1992 BB	Asher	January 25, 1992	Siding Spring	R. H. McNaught	·	1.6 km (0.99 mi)	MPC · JPL
6565 Reiji	1992 FT	Reiji	March 23, 1992	Kitami	K. Endate, K. Watanabe	·	4.1 km (2.5 mi)	MPC · JPL
6566 Shafter	1992 UB_{2}	Shafter	October 25, 1992	Oohira	T. Urata	·	4.4 km (2.7 mi)	MPC · JPL
6567 Shigemasa	1992 WS	Shigemasa	November 16, 1992	Kitami	K. Endate, K. Watanabe	(2076)	4.6 km (2.9 mi)	MPC · JPL
6568 Serendip	1993 DT	Serendip	February 21, 1993	Kushiro	S. Ueda, H. Kaneda	·	9.8 km (6.1 mi)	MPC · JPL
6569 Ondaatje	1993 MO	Ondaatje	June 22, 1993	Palomar	J. E. Mueller	AMO +1 km (0.62 mi)	1.7 km (1.1 mi)	MPC · JPL
6570 Tomohiro	1994 JO	Tomohiro	May 6, 1994	Kitami	K. Endate, K. Watanabe	·	23 km (14 mi)	MPC · JPL
6571 Sigmund	3027 P-L	Sigmund	September 24, 1960	Palomar	C. J. van Houten, I. van Houten-Groeneveld, T. Gehrels	·	4.5 km (2.8 mi)	MPC · JPL
6572 Carson	1938 SX	Carson	September 22, 1938	Turku	Y. Väisälä	·	8.4 km (5.2 mi)	MPC · JPL
6573 Magnitskij	1974 SK_{1}	Magnitskij	September 19, 1974	Nauchnij	L. I. Chernykh	(5)	7.4 km (4.6 mi)	MPC · JPL
6574 Gvishiani	1976 QE_{1}	Gvishiani	August 26, 1976	Nauchnij	N. S. Chernykh	CYB	25 km (16 mi)	MPC · JPL
6575 Slavov	1978 PJ_{2}	Slavov	August 8, 1978	Nauchnij	N. S. Chernykh	HYG	12 km (7.5 mi)	MPC · JPL
6576 Kievtech	1978 RK_{1}	Kievtech	September 5, 1978	Nauchnij	N. S. Chernykh	THM	17 km (11 mi)	MPC · JPL
6577 Torbenwolff	1978 VB_{6}	Torbenwolff	November 7, 1978	Palomar	E. F. Helin, S. J. Bus	PHO	5.5 km (3.4 mi)	MPC · JPL
6578 Zapesotskij	1980 TQ_{14}	Zapesotskij	October 13, 1980	Nauchnij	T. M. Smirnova	NYS	7.9 km (4.9 mi)	MPC · JPL
6579 Benedix	1981 ES_{4}	Benedix	March 2, 1981	Siding Spring	S. J. Bus	·	6.5 km (4.0 mi)	MPC · JPL
6580 Philbland	1981 EW_{21}	Philbland	March 2, 1981	Siding Spring	S. J. Bus	·	7.4 km (4.6 mi)	MPC · JPL
6581 Sobers	1981 SO	Sobers	September 22, 1981	Kleť	A. Mrkos	·	5.7 km (3.5 mi)	MPC · JPL
6582 Flagsymphony	1981 VS	Flagsymphony	November 5, 1981	Anderson Mesa	E. Bowell	slow	19 km (12 mi)	MPC · JPL
6583 Destinn	1984 DE	Destinn	February 21, 1984	Kleť	A. Mrkos	slow	11 km (6.8 mi)	MPC · JPL
6584 Luděkpešek	1984 FK	Luděkpešek	March 31, 1984	Anderson Mesa	E. Bowell	·	5.0 km (3.1 mi)	MPC · JPL
6585 O'Keefe	1984 SR	O'Keefe	September 26, 1984	Palomar	C. S. Shoemaker, E. M. Shoemaker	·	5.0 km (3.1 mi)	MPC · JPL
6586 Seydler	1984 UK_{1}	Seydler	October 28, 1984	Kleť	A. Mrkos	·	5.3 km (3.3 mi)	MPC · JPL
6587 Brassens	1984 WA_{4}	Brassens	November 27, 1984	Caussols	CERGA	·	4.1 km (2.5 mi)	MPC · JPL
6588	1985 RC_{4}	—	September 10, 1985	La Silla	H. Debehogne	KOR	9.1 km (5.7 mi)	MPC · JPL
6589 Jankovich	1985 SL_{3}	Jankovich	September 19, 1985	Nauchnij	N. S. Chernykh, L. I. Chernykh	(2076)	3.9 km (2.4 mi)	MPC · JPL
6590 Barolo	1985 TA_{2}	Barolo	October 15, 1985	Anderson Mesa	E. Bowell	EOS	10 km (6.2 mi)	MPC · JPL
6591 Sabinin	1986 RT_{5}	Sabinin	September 7, 1986	Nauchnij	L. I. Chernykh	·	9.8 km (6.1 mi)	MPC · JPL
6592 Goya	1986 TB_{12}	Goya	October 3, 1986	Nauchnij	L. G. Karachkina	MRX	5.5 km (3.4 mi)	MPC · JPL
6593	1986 UV	—	October 28, 1986	Kleť	Z. Vávrová	PAD	10 km (6.2 mi)	MPC · JPL
6594 Tasman	1987 MM_{1}	Tasman	June 25, 1987	Kleť	A. Mrkos	GEF	7.0 km (4.3 mi)	MPC · JPL
6595 Munizbarreto	1987 QZ_{1}	Munizbarreto	August 21, 1987	La Silla	E. W. Elst	·	3.3 km (2.1 mi)	MPC · JPL
6596 Bittner	1987 VC_{1}	Bittner	November 15, 1987	Kleť	A. Mrkos	·	6.9 km (4.3 mi)	MPC · JPL
6597 Kreil	1988 AF_{1}	Kreil	January 9, 1988	Kleť	A. Mrkos	·	4.1 km (2.5 mi)	MPC · JPL
6598 Modugno	1988 CL	Modugno	February 13, 1988	Bologna	San Vittore	·	11 km (6.8 mi)	MPC · JPL
6599 Tsuko	1988 PV	Tsuko	August 8, 1988	Kitami	K. Endate, K. Watanabe	·	3.4 km (2.1 mi)	MPC · JPL
6600 Qwerty	1988 QW	Qwerty	August 17, 1988	Kleť	A. Mrkos	·	3.7 km (2.3 mi)	MPC · JPL

== 6601–6700 ==
back to top

Designation			Discovery			Properties		Ref
Permanent	Provisional	Named after	Date	Site	Discoverer(s)	Category	Diam.	Ref
6601 Schmeer	1988 XK_{1}	Schmeer	December 7, 1988	Kushiro	S. Ueda, H. Kaneda	·	6.9 km (4.3 mi)	MPC · JPL
6602 Gilclark	1989 EC	Gilclark	March 4, 1989	Palomar	E. F. Helin	H	4.1 km (2.5 mi)	MPC · JPL
6603 Marycragg	1990 KG	Marycragg	May 19, 1990	Palomar	E. F. Helin	·	11 km (6.8 mi)	MPC · JPL
6604 Ilias	1990 QE_{8}	Ilias	August 16, 1990	La Silla	E. W. Elst	·	10 km (6.2 mi)	MPC · JPL
6605 Carmontelle	1990 SM_{9}	Carmontelle	September 22, 1990	La Silla	E. W. Elst	KOR	7.5 km (4.7 mi)	MPC · JPL
6606 Makino	1990 UF	Makino	October 16, 1990	Geisei	T. Seki	·	14 km (8.7 mi)	MPC · JPL
6607 Matsushima	1991 UL_{2}	Matsushima	October 29, 1991	Kitami	K. Endate, K. Watanabe	·	7.4 km (4.6 mi)	MPC · JPL
6608 Davidecrespi	1991 VC_{4}	Davidecrespi	November 2, 1991	Palomar	E. F. Helin	·	5.6 km (3.5 mi)	MPC · JPL
6609	1992 BN	—	January 28, 1992	Kushiro	S. Ueda, H. Kaneda	EOS	14 km (8.7 mi)	MPC · JPL
6610 Burwitz	1993 BL_{3}	Burwitz	January 28, 1993	Yakiimo	Natori, A., T. Urata	·	5.2 km (3.2 mi)	MPC · JPL
6611	1993 VW	—	November 9, 1993	Palomar	E. F. Helin, J. Alu	APO +1 km (0.62 mi)	1.4 km (0.87 mi)	MPC · JPL
6612 Hachioji	1994 EM_{1}	Hachioji	March 10, 1994	Yatsugatake	Y. Kushida, O. Muramatsu	NYS	4.7 km (2.9 mi)	MPC · JPL
6613 Williamcarl	1994 LK	Williamcarl	June 2, 1994	Catalina Station	C. W. Hergenrother	·	19 km (12 mi)	MPC · JPL
6614 Antisthenes	6530 P-L	Antisthenes	September 24, 1960	Palomar	C. J. van Houten, I. van Houten-Groeneveld, T. Gehrels	·	9.2 km (5.7 mi)	MPC · JPL
6615 Plutarchos	9512 P-L	Plutarchos	October 17, 1960	Palomar	C. J. van Houten, I. van Houten-Groeneveld, T. Gehrels	moon	3.1 km (1.9 mi)	MPC · JPL
6616 Plotinos	1175 T-1	Plotinos	March 25, 1971	Palomar	C. J. van Houten, I. van Houten-Groeneveld, T. Gehrels	V	4.1 km (2.5 mi)	MPC · JPL
6617 Boethius	2218 T-1	Boethius	March 25, 1971	Palomar	C. J. van Houten, I. van Houten-Groeneveld, T. Gehrels	·	3.7 km (2.3 mi)	MPC · JPL
6618 Jimsimons	1936 SO	Jimsimons	September 16, 1936	Flagstaff	C. W. Tombaugh	H	12 km (7.5 mi)	MPC · JPL
6619 Kolya	1973 SS_{4}	Kolya	September 27, 1973	Nauchnij	L. I. Chernykh	·	30 km (19 mi)	MPC · JPL
6620 Peregrina	1973 UC	Peregrina	October 25, 1973	Zimmerwald	P. Wild	·	8.0 km (5.0 mi)	MPC · JPL
6621 Timchuk	1975 VN_{5}	Timchuk	November 2, 1975	Nauchnij	T. M. Smirnova	·	12 km (7.5 mi)	MPC · JPL
6622 Matvienko	1978 RG_{1}	Matvienko	September 5, 1978	Nauchnij	N. S. Chernykh	·	10 km (6.2 mi)	MPC · JPL
6623 Trioconbrio	1979 MY_{2}	Trioconbrio	June 25, 1979	Siding Spring	E. F. Helin, S. J. Bus	·	5.5 km (3.4 mi)	MPC · JPL
6624	1980 SG	—	September 16, 1980	Kleť	Z. Vávrová	·	8.6 km (5.3 mi)	MPC · JPL
6625 Nyquist	1981 EX_{41}	Nyquist	March 2, 1981	Siding Spring	S. J. Bus	THM	9.7 km (6.0 mi)	MPC · JPL
6626 Mattgenge	1981 EZ_{46}	Mattgenge	March 2, 1981	Siding Spring	S. J. Bus	slow	8.0 km (5.0 mi)	MPC · JPL
6627	1981 FT	—	March 27, 1981	Kleť	Z. Vávrová	·	4.1 km (2.5 mi)	MPC · JPL
6628 Dondelia	1981 WA_{1}	Dondelia	November 24, 1981	Anderson Mesa	E. Bowell	KOR	8.4 km (5.2 mi)	MPC · JPL
6629 Kurtz	1982 UP	Kurtz	October 17, 1982	Anderson Mesa	E. Bowell	·	2.9 km (1.8 mi)	MPC · JPL
6630 Skepticus	1982 VA_{1}	Skepticus	November 15, 1982	Anderson Mesa	E. Bowell	(883)	4.6 km (2.9 mi)	MPC · JPL
6631 Pyatnitskij	1983 RQ_{4}	Pyatnitskij	September 4, 1983	Nauchnij	L. V. Zhuravleva	·	14 km (8.7 mi)	MPC · JPL
6632 Scoon	1984 UX_{1}	Scoon	October 29, 1984	Anderson Mesa	E. Bowell	V	3.7 km (2.3 mi)	MPC · JPL
6633	1986 TR_{4}	—	October 11, 1986	Brorfelde	P. Jensen	·	8.6 km (5.3 mi)	MPC · JPL
6634	1987 KB	—	May 23, 1987	Campinas	Campinas	·	11 km (6.8 mi)	MPC · JPL
6635 Zuber	1987 SH_{3}	Zuber	September 26, 1987	Palomar	C. S. Shoemaker, E. M. Shoemaker	H	3.9 km (2.4 mi)	MPC · JPL
6636 Kintanar	1988 RK_{8}	Kintanar	September 11, 1988	Smolyan	V. G. Shkodrov	·	3.6 km (2.2 mi)	MPC · JPL
6637 Inoue	1988 XZ	Inoue	December 3, 1988	Kitami	K. Endate, K. Watanabe	·	4.8 km (3.0 mi)	MPC · JPL
6638	1989 CA	—	February 2, 1989	Yorii	M. Arai, H. Mori	NYS	5.7 km (3.5 mi)	MPC · JPL
6639 Marchis	1989 SO_{8}	Marchis	September 25, 1989	La Silla	H. Debehogne	THM	14 km (8.7 mi)	MPC · JPL
6640 Falorni	1990 DL	Falorni	February 24, 1990	Bologna	San Vittore	·	3.4 km (2.1 mi)	MPC · JPL
6641 Bobross	1990 OK_{2}	Bobross	July 29, 1990	Palomar	H. E. Holt	·	6.1 km (3.8 mi)	MPC · JPL
6642 Henze	1990 UE_{3}	Henze	October 26, 1990	Oohira	T. Urata	·	15 km (9.3 mi)	MPC · JPL
6643 Morikubo	1990 VZ	Morikubo	November 7, 1990	Yatsugatake	Y. Kushida, O. Muramatsu	·	13 km (8.1 mi)	MPC · JPL
6644 Jugaku	1991 AA	Jugaku	January 5, 1991	Kitami	A. Takahashi, K. Watanabe	HYG	14 km (8.7 mi)	MPC · JPL
6645 Arcetri	1991 AR_{1}	Arcetri	January 11, 1991	Palomar	E. F. Helin	THM	12 km (7.5 mi)	MPC · JPL
6646 Churanta	1991 CA_{3}	Churanta	February 14, 1991	Palomar	E. F. Helin	H	1.9 km (1.2 mi)	MPC · JPL
6647 Josse	1991 GG_{5}	Josse	April 8, 1991	La Silla	E. W. Elst	·	6.5 km (4.0 mi)	MPC · JPL
6648	1991 PM_{11}	—	August 9, 1991	Palomar	H. E. Holt	(5)	6.3 km (3.9 mi)	MPC · JPL
6649 Yokotatakao	1991 RN	Yokotatakao	September 5, 1991	Yakiimo	Natori, A., T. Urata	·	7.4 km (4.6 mi)	MPC · JPL
6650 Morimoto	1991 RS_{1}	Morimoto	September 7, 1991	Kitami	K. Endate, K. Watanabe	EUN	7.5 km (4.7 mi)	MPC · JPL
6651 Rogervenable	1991 RV_{9}	Rogervenable	September 10, 1991	Palomar	H. E. Holt	·	6.8 km (4.2 mi)	MPC · JPL
6652	1991 SJ_{1}	—	September 16, 1991	Palomar	H. E. Holt	·	7.9 km (4.9 mi)	MPC · JPL
6653 Feininger	1991 XR_{1}	Feininger	December 10, 1991	Tautenburg Observatory	F. Börngen	KOR	6.2 km (3.9 mi)	MPC · JPL
6654 Luleå	1992 DT_{6}	Luleå	February 29, 1992	La Silla	UESAC	HYG	12 km (7.5 mi)	MPC · JPL
6655 Nagahama	1992 EL_{1}	Nagahama	March 8, 1992	Dynic	A. Sugie	EOS	16 km (9.9 mi)	MPC · JPL
6656 Yokota	1992 FF	Yokota	March 23, 1992	Kitami	K. Endate, K. Watanabe	THM	19 km (12 mi)	MPC · JPL
6657 Otukyo	1992 WY	Otukyo	November 17, 1992	Dynic	A. Sugie	·	2.7 km (1.7 mi)	MPC · JPL
6658 Akiraabe	1992 WT_{2}	Akiraabe	November 18, 1992	Kitami	K. Endate, K. Watanabe	·	6.0 km (3.7 mi)	MPC · JPL
6659 Pietsch	1992 YN	Pietsch	December 24, 1992	Oohira	T. Urata	V	5.5 km (3.4 mi)	MPC · JPL
6660 Matsumoto	1993 BC	Matsumoto	January 16, 1993	Geisei	T. Seki	NYS	3.1 km (1.9 mi)	MPC · JPL
6661 Ikemura	1993 BO	Ikemura	January 17, 1993	Kani	Y. Mizuno, T. Furuta	·	11 km (6.8 mi)	MPC · JPL
6662	1993 BP_{13}	—	January 22, 1993	Kushiro	S. Ueda, H. Kaneda	EUN	8.3 km (5.2 mi)	MPC · JPL
6663 Tatebayashi	1993 CC	Tatebayashi	February 12, 1993	Oizumi	T. Kobayashi	EUN	8.6 km (5.3 mi)	MPC · JPL
6664 Tennyo	1993 CK	Tennyo	February 14, 1993	Oizumi	T. Kobayashi	·	4.2 km (2.6 mi)	MPC · JPL
6665 Kagawa	1993 CN	Kagawa	February 14, 1993	Oohira	T. Urata	EOS	12 km (7.5 mi)	MPC · JPL
6666 Frö	1993 FG_{20}	Frö	March 19, 1993	La Silla	UESAC	·	4.1 km (2.5 mi)	MPC · JPL
6667 Sannaimura	1994 EK_{2}	Sannaimura	March 14, 1994	Yatsugatake	Y. Kushida, O. Muramatsu	·	6.0 km (3.7 mi)	MPC · JPL
6668	1994 GY_{8}	—	April 11, 1994	Kushiro	S. Ueda, H. Kaneda	·	10 km (6.2 mi)	MPC · JPL
6669 Obi	1994 JA_{1}	Obi	May 5, 1994	Kitami	K. Endate, K. Watanabe	·	6.2 km (3.9 mi)	MPC · JPL
6670 Wallach	1994 LL_{1}	Wallach	June 4, 1994	Palomar	C. S. Shoemaker, D. H. Levy	·	8.7 km (5.4 mi)	MPC · JPL
6671 Concari	1994 NC_{1}	Concari	July 5, 1994	Palomar	E. F. Helin	·	11 km (6.8 mi)	MPC · JPL
6672 Corot	1213 T-1	Corot	March 24, 1971	Palomar	C. J. van Houten, I. van Houten-Groeneveld, T. Gehrels	·	2.1 km (1.3 mi)	MPC · JPL
6673 Degas	2246 T-1	Degas	March 25, 1971	Palomar	C. J. van Houten, I. van Houten-Groeneveld, T. Gehrels	·	12 km (7.5 mi)	MPC · JPL
6674 Cézanne	4272 T-1	Cézanne	March 26, 1971	Palomar	C. J. van Houten, I. van Houten-Groeneveld, T. Gehrels	NYS	12 km (7.5 mi)	MPC · JPL
6675 Sisley	1493 T-2	Sisley	September 29, 1973	Palomar	C. J. van Houten, I. van Houten-Groeneveld, T. Gehrels	·	8.2 km (5.1 mi)	MPC · JPL
6676 Monet	2083 T-2	Monet	September 29, 1973	Palomar	C. J. van Houten, I. van Houten-Groeneveld, T. Gehrels	THM	11 km (6.8 mi)	MPC · JPL
6677 Renoir	3045 T-3	Renoir	October 16, 1977	Palomar	C. J. van Houten, I. van Houten-Groeneveld, T. Gehrels	·	19 km (12 mi)	MPC · JPL
6678 Seurat	3422 T-3	Seurat	October 16, 1977	Palomar	C. J. van Houten, I. van Houten-Groeneveld, T. Gehrels	·	7.3 km (4.5 mi)	MPC · JPL
6679 Gurzhij	1969 UP_{1}	Gurzhij	October 16, 1969	Nauchnij	L. I. Chernykh	·	4.1 km (2.5 mi)	MPC · JPL
6680	1970 WD	—	November 24, 1970	Hamburg-Bergedorf	L. Kohoutek	·	4.5 km (2.8 mi)	MPC · JPL
6681 Prokopovich	1972 RU_{3}	Prokopovich	September 6, 1972	Nauchnij	L. V. Zhuravleva	·	4.3 km (2.7 mi)	MPC · JPL
6682 Makarij	1973 ST_{3}	Makarij	September 25, 1973	Nauchnij	L. V. Zhuravleva	·	4.7 km (2.9 mi)	MPC · JPL
6683 Karachentsov	1976 GQ_{2}	Karachentsov	April 1, 1976	Nauchnij	N. S. Chernykh	·	20 km (12 mi)	MPC · JPL
6684 Volodshevchenko	1977 QU	Volodshevchenko	August 19, 1977	Nauchnij	N. S. Chernykh	·	5.1 km (3.2 mi)	MPC · JPL
6685 Boitsov	1978 QG_{2}	Boitsov	August 31, 1978	Nauchnij	N. S. Chernykh	·	3.6 km (2.2 mi)	MPC · JPL
6686 Hernius	1979 QC_{2}	Hernius	August 22, 1979	La Silla	C.-I. Lagerkvist	KOR	8.6 km (5.3 mi)	MPC · JPL
6687 Lahulla	1980 FN_{1}	Lahulla	March 16, 1980	La Silla	C.-I. Lagerkvist	·	3.4 km (2.1 mi)	MPC · JPL
6688 Donmccarthy	1981 ER_{17}	Donmccarthy	March 2, 1981	Siding Spring	S. J. Bus	HYG	8.9 km (5.5 mi)	MPC · JPL
6689 Floss	1981 EQ_{24}	Floss	March 2, 1981	Siding Spring	S. J. Bus	fast	3.0 km (1.9 mi)	MPC · JPL
6690 Messick	1981 SY_{1}	Messick	September 25, 1981	Anderson Mesa	B. A. Skiff	·	4.0 km (2.5 mi)	MPC · JPL
6691 Trussoni	1984 DX	Trussoni	February 26, 1984	La Silla	H. Debehogne	·	5.1 km (3.2 mi)	MPC · JPL
6692 Antonínholý	1985 HL	Antonínholý	April 18, 1985	Kleť	Z. Vávrová	·	3.8 km (2.4 mi)	MPC · JPL
6693	1986 CC_{2}	—	February 12, 1986	La Silla	H. Debehogne	·	8.4 km (5.2 mi)	MPC · JPL
6694	1986 PF	—	August 4, 1986	Palomar	INAS	·	7.5 km (4.7 mi)	MPC · JPL
6695 Barrettduff	1986 PD_{1}	Barrettduff	August 1, 1986	Palomar	E. F. Helin	·	5.1 km (3.2 mi)	MPC · JPL
6696 Eubanks	1986 RC_{1}	Eubanks	September 1, 1986	Harvard Observatory	Oak Ridge Observatory	MIS	9.0 km (5.6 mi)	MPC · JPL
6697 Celentano	1987 HM_{1}	Celentano	April 24, 1987	Kleť	Z. Vávrová	·	15 km (9.3 mi)	MPC · JPL
6698 Malhotra	1987 SL_{1}	Malhotra	September 21, 1987	Anderson Mesa	E. Bowell	NYS ·	8.5 km (5.3 mi)	MPC · JPL
6699 Igaueno	1987 YK	Igaueno	December 19, 1987	Geisei	T. Seki	(5)	5.9 km (3.7 mi)	MPC · JPL
6700 Kubišová	1988 AO_{1}	Kubišová	January 12, 1988	Kleť	Z. Vávrová	·	10 km (6.2 mi)	MPC · JPL

== 6701–6800 ==
back to top

Designation			Discovery			Properties		Ref
Permanent	Provisional	Named after	Date	Site	Discoverer(s)	Category	Diam.	Ref
6701 Warhol	1988 AW_{1}	Warhol	January 14, 1988	Kleť	A. Mrkos	·	8.9 km (5.5 mi)	MPC · JPL
6702	1988 BP_{3}	—	January 18, 1988	La Silla	H. Debehogne	·	11 km (6.8 mi)	MPC · JPL
6703	1988 CH	—	February 10, 1988	Yorii	M. Arai, H. Mori	(5)	7.8 km (4.8 mi)	MPC · JPL
6704	1988 CJ	—	February 10, 1988	Yorii	M. Arai, H. Mori	AGN ·	10 km (6.2 mi)	MPC · JPL
6705 Rinaketty	1988 RK_{5}	Rinaketty	September 2, 1988	La Silla	H. Debehogne	·	3.5 km (2.2 mi)	MPC · JPL
6706	1988 VD_{3}	—	November 11, 1988	Chiyoda	T. Kojima	NYS	5.1 km (3.2 mi)	MPC · JPL
6707 Shigeru	1988 VZ_{3}	Shigeru	November 13, 1988	Kitami	M. Yanai, K. Watanabe	·	3.1 km (1.9 mi)	MPC · JPL
6708 Bobbievaile	1989 AA_{5}	Bobbievaile	January 4, 1989	Siding Spring	R. H. McNaught	PHO · moon	8.1 km (5.0 mi)	MPC · JPL
6709 Hiromiyuki	1989 CD	Hiromiyuki	February 2, 1989	Yorii	M. Arai, H. Mori	·	4.0 km (2.5 mi)	MPC · JPL
6710 Apostel	1989 GF_{4}	Apostel	April 3, 1989	La Silla	E. W. Elst	·	12 km (7.5 mi)	MPC · JPL
6711 Holliman	1989 HG	Holliman	April 30, 1989	Palomar	E. F. Helin	·	5.2 km (3.2 mi)	MPC · JPL
6712 Hornstein	1990 DS_{1}	Hornstein	February 23, 1990	Kleť	A. Mrkos	·	9.3 km (5.8 mi)	MPC · JPL
6713 Coggie	1990 KM	Coggie	May 21, 1990	Palomar	E. F. Helin	PHO	4.4 km (2.7 mi)	MPC · JPL
6714 Montréal	1990 OE_{2}	Montréal	July 29, 1990	Palomar	H. E. Holt	·	9.5 km (5.9 mi)	MPC · JPL
6715 Sheldonmarks	1990 QS_{1}	Sheldonmarks	August 22, 1990	Palomar	H. E. Holt, D. H. Levy	·	9.3 km (5.8 mi)	MPC · JPL
6716 Jacobsen	1990 RO_{1}	Jacobsen	September 14, 1990	Palomar	H. E. Holt	HOF	16 km (9.9 mi)	MPC · JPL
6717 Antal	1990 TU_{10}	Antal	October 10, 1990	Tautenburg Observatory	F. Börngen, L. D. Schmadel	DOR	10 km (6.2 mi)	MPC · JPL
6718 Beiglböck	1990 TT_{12}	Beiglböck	October 14, 1990	Tautenburg Observatory	L. D. Schmadel, F. Börngen	KOR	9.0 km (5.6 mi)	MPC · JPL
6719 Gallaj	1990 UL_{11}	Gallaj	October 16, 1990	Nauchnij	L. V. Zhuravleva, G. R. Kastelʹ	·	8.1 km (5.0 mi)	MPC · JPL
6720 Gifu	1990 VP_{2}	Gifu	November 11, 1990	Geisei	T. Seki	·	21 km (13 mi)	MPC · JPL
6721 Minamiawaji	1990 VY_{6}	Minamiawaji	November 10, 1990	Oohira	T. Urata	·	15 km (9.3 mi)	MPC · JPL
6722 Bunichi	1991 BG_{2}	Bunichi	January 23, 1991	Kitami	K. Endate, K. Watanabe	·	15 km (9.3 mi)	MPC · JPL
6723 Chrisclark	1991 CL_{3}	Chrisclark	February 14, 1991	Palomar	E. F. Helin	·	19 km (12 mi)	MPC · JPL
6724	1991 CX_{5}	—	February 4, 1991	Kushiro	S. Ueda, H. Kaneda	·	21 km (13 mi)	MPC · JPL
6725 Engyoji	1991 DS	Engyoji	February 21, 1991	Karasuyama	S. Inoda, T. Urata	THM	20 km (12 mi)	MPC · JPL
6726 Suthers	1991 PS	Suthers	August 5, 1991	Palomar	H. E. Holt	slow	3.5 km (2.2 mi)	MPC · JPL
6727	1991 TF_{4}	—	October 10, 1991	Palomar	K. J. Lawrence	·	8.9 km (5.5 mi)	MPC · JPL
6728	1991 UM	—	October 18, 1991	Kushiro	S. Ueda, H. Kaneda	·	2.8 km (1.7 mi)	MPC · JPL
6729 Emiko	1991 VV_{2}	Emiko	November 4, 1991	Kiyosato	S. Otomo	EUN	9.4 km (5.8 mi)	MPC · JPL
6730 Ikeda	1992 BH	Ikeda	January 24, 1992	Oohira	T. Urata	TIR	9.1 km (5.7 mi)	MPC · JPL
6731 Hiei	1992 BK	Hiei	January 24, 1992	Yatsugatake	Y. Kushida, O. Muramatsu	·	8.0 km (5.0 mi)	MPC · JPL
6732	1992 CG_{1}	—	February 8, 1992	Kushiro	S. Ueda, H. Kaneda	THM	13 km (8.1 mi)	MPC · JPL
6733	1992 EF	—	March 2, 1992	Kushiro	S. Ueda, H. Kaneda	EOS	13 km (8.1 mi)	MPC · JPL
6734 Benzenberg	1992 FB	Benzenberg	March 23, 1992	Kushiro	S. Ueda, H. Kaneda	EOS · slow	14 km (8.7 mi)	MPC · JPL
6735 Madhatter	1992 WM_{3}	Madhatter	November 23, 1992	Oohira	T. Urata	·	5.0 km (3.1 mi)	MPC · JPL
6736 Marchare	1993 EF	Marchare	March 1, 1993	Oohira	T. Urata	NYS	5.6 km (3.5 mi)	MPC · JPL
6737 Okabayashi	1993 ER	Okabayashi	March 15, 1993	Kitami	K. Endate, K. Watanabe	·	4.6 km (2.9 mi)	MPC · JPL
6738 Tanabe	1993 FD_{1}	Tanabe	March 20, 1993	Kitami	K. Endate, K. Watanabe	·	4.4 km (2.7 mi)	MPC · JPL
6739 Tärendö	1993 FU_{38}	Tärendö	March 19, 1993	La Silla	UESAC	THM	14 km (8.7 mi)	MPC · JPL
6740 Goff	1993 GY	Goff	April 14, 1993	Palomar	C. S. Shoemaker, E. M. Shoemaker	·	6.7 km (4.2 mi)	MPC · JPL
6741 Liyuan	1994 FX	Liyuan	March 31, 1994	Kitami	K. Endate, K. Watanabe	·	4.6 km (2.9 mi)	MPC · JPL
6742 Biandepei	1994 GR	Biandepei	April 8, 1994	Kitami	K. Endate, K. Watanabe	·	5.4 km (3.4 mi)	MPC · JPL
6743 Liu	1994 GS	Liu	April 8, 1994	Kitami	K. Endate, K. Watanabe	·	5.3 km (3.3 mi)	MPC · JPL
6744 Komoda	1994 JL	Komoda	May 6, 1994	Kitami	K. Endate, K. Watanabe	·	4.0 km (2.5 mi)	MPC · JPL
6745 Nishiyama	1994 JD_{1}	Nishiyama	May 7, 1994	Kitami	K. Endate, K. Watanabe	·	2.6 km (1.6 mi)	MPC · JPL
6746 Zagar	1994 NP	Zagar	July 9, 1994	Bologna	San Vittore	EUN	7.7 km (4.8 mi)	MPC · JPL
6747 Ozegahara	1995 UT_{3}	Ozegahara	October 20, 1995	Oizumi	T. Kobayashi	·	14 km (8.7 mi)	MPC · JPL
6748 Bratton	1995 UV_{30}	Bratton	October 20, 1995	Kitt Peak	Spacewatch	·	11 km (6.8 mi)	MPC · JPL
6749 Ireentje	7068 P-L	Ireentje	October 17, 1960	Palomar	C. J. van Houten, I. van Houten-Groeneveld, T. Gehrels	·	4.9 km (3.0 mi)	MPC · JPL
6750 Katgert	1078 T-1	Katgert	March 24, 1971	Palomar	C. J. van Houten, I. van Houten-Groeneveld, T. Gehrels	·	9.9 km (6.2 mi)	MPC · JPL
6751 van Genderen	1114 T-1	van Genderen	March 25, 1971	Palomar	C. J. van Houten, I. van Houten-Groeneveld, T. Gehrels	·	4.1 km (2.5 mi)	MPC · JPL
6752 Ashley	4150 T-1	Ashley	March 26, 1971	Palomar	C. J. van Houten, I. van Houten-Groeneveld, T. Gehrels	PHO	7.3 km (4.5 mi)	MPC · JPL
6753 Fursenko	1974 RV_{1}	Fursenko	September 14, 1974	Nauchnij	N. S. Chernykh	·	5.5 km (3.4 mi)	MPC · JPL
6754 Burdenko	1976 UD_{4}	Burdenko	October 28, 1976	Nauchnij	L. V. Zhuravleva	NYS	5.1 km (3.2 mi)	MPC · JPL
6755 Solovʹyanenko	1976 YE_{1}	Solovʹyanenko	December 16, 1976	Nauchnij	L. I. Chernykh	·	7.1 km (4.4 mi)	MPC · JPL
6756 Williamfeldman	1978 VX_{3}	Williamfeldman	November 7, 1978	Palomar	E. F. Helin, S. J. Bus	·	3.9 km (2.4 mi)	MPC · JPL
6757 Addibischoff	1979 SE_{15}	Addibischoff	September 20, 1979	Palomar	S. J. Bus	KOR	6.7 km (4.2 mi)	MPC · JPL
6758 Jesseowens	1980 GL	Jesseowens	April 13, 1980	Kleť	A. Mrkos	ADE	12 km (7.5 mi)	MPC · JPL
6759	1980 KD	—	May 21, 1980	La Silla	H. Debehogne	·	19 km (12 mi)	MPC · JPL
6760	1980 KM	—	May 22, 1980	La Silla	H. Debehogne	·	7.5 km (4.7 mi)	MPC · JPL
6761 Haroldconnolly	1981 EV_{19}	Haroldconnolly	March 2, 1981	Siding Spring	S. J. Bus	·	7.5 km (4.7 mi)	MPC · JPL
6762 Cyrenagoodrich	1981 EC_{25}	Cyrenagoodrich	March 2, 1981	Siding Spring	S. J. Bus	·	3.7 km (2.3 mi)	MPC · JPL
6763 Kochiny	1981 RA_{2}	Kochiny	September 7, 1981	Nauchnij	L. G. Karachkina	·	7.1 km (4.4 mi)	MPC · JPL
6764 Kirillavrov	1981 TM_{3}	Kirillavrov	October 7, 1981	Nauchnij	L. I. Chernykh	moon	5.3 km (3.3 mi)	MPC · JPL
6765 Fibonacci	1982 BQ_{2}	Fibonacci	January 20, 1982	Kleť	L. Brožek	·	7.4 km (4.6 mi)	MPC · JPL
6766 Kharms	1982 UC_{6}	Kharms	October 20, 1982	Nauchnij	L. G. Karachkina	·	5.8 km (3.6 mi)	MPC · JPL
6767 Shirvindt	1983 AA_{3}	Shirvindt	January 6, 1983	Nauchnij	L. G. Karachkina	·	6.4 km (4.0 mi)	MPC · JPL
6768 Mathiasbraun	1983 RY	Mathiasbraun	September 7, 1983	Kleť	A. Mrkos	NYS ·	9.5 km (5.9 mi)	MPC · JPL
6769 Brokoff	1985 CJ_{1}	Brokoff	February 15, 1985	Kleť	A. Mrkos	(6769)	9.7 km (6.0 mi)	MPC · JPL
6770 Fugate	1985 QR	Fugate	August 22, 1985	Anderson Mesa	E. Bowell	EOS	10 km (6.2 mi)	MPC · JPL
6771 Foerster	1986 EZ_{4}	Foerster	March 9, 1986	Siding Spring	C.-I. Lagerkvist	·	3.1 km (1.9 mi)	MPC · JPL
6772	1988 BG_{4}	—	January 20, 1988	La Silla	H. Debehogne	·	6.6 km (4.1 mi)	MPC · JPL
6773 Kellaway	1988 LK	Kellaway	June 15, 1988	Palomar	E. F. Helin	EOS	9.1 km (5.7 mi)	MPC · JPL
6774 Vladheinrich	1988 VH_{5}	Vladheinrich	November 4, 1988	Kleť	A. Mrkos	·	3.4 km (2.1 mi)	MPC · JPL
6775 Giorgini	1989 GJ	Giorgini	April 5, 1989	Palomar	E. F. Helin	EUN	5.9 km (3.7 mi)	MPC · JPL
6776 Dix	1989 GF_{8}	Dix	April 6, 1989	Tautenburg Observatory	F. Börngen	(5)	5.0 km (3.1 mi)	MPC · JPL
6777 Balakirev	1989 SV_{1}	Balakirev	September 26, 1989	La Silla	E. W. Elst	·	12 km (7.5 mi)	MPC · JPL
6778 Tosamakoto	1989 TX_{10}	Tosamakoto	October 4, 1989	Kitami	A. Takahashi, K. Watanabe	KOR	7.8 km (4.8 mi)	MPC · JPL
6779 Perrine	1990 DM_{1}	Perrine	February 20, 1990	Kleť	Z. Vávrová	·	4.2 km (2.6 mi)	MPC · JPL
6780 Borodin	1990 ES_{3}	Borodin	March 2, 1990	La Silla	E. W. Elst	·	4.0 km (2.5 mi)	MPC · JPL
6781 Sheikhumarrkhan	1990 OD	Sheikhumarrkhan	July 19, 1990	Palomar	E. F. Helin	·	9.2 km (5.7 mi)	MPC · JPL
6782	1990 SU_{10}	—	September 16, 1990	Palomar	H. E. Holt	HOF	15 km (9.3 mi)	MPC · JPL
6783 Gulyaev	1990 SO_{28}	Gulyaev	September 24, 1990	Nauchnij	L. I. Chernykh	·	6.3 km (3.9 mi)	MPC · JPL
6784 Bogatikov	1990 UN_{13}	Bogatikov	October 28, 1990	Nauchnij	L. I. Chernykh	AGN	6.2 km (3.9 mi)	MPC · JPL
6785	1990 VA_{7}	—	November 12, 1990	Fujieda	Shiozawa, H., M. Kizawa	·	28 km (17 mi)	MPC · JPL
6786 Doudantsutsuji	1991 DT	Doudantsutsuji	February 21, 1991	Karasuyama	S. Inoda, T. Urata	THM	13 km (8.1 mi)	MPC · JPL
6787	1991 PF_{15}	—	August 7, 1991	Palomar	H. E. Holt	·	4.9 km (3.0 mi)	MPC · JPL
6788	1991 PH_{15}	—	August 7, 1991	Palomar	H. E. Holt	·	5.9 km (3.7 mi)	MPC · JPL
6789 Milkey	1991 RM_{6}	Milkey	September 4, 1991	Palomar	E. F. Helin	·	5.5 km (3.4 mi)	MPC · JPL
6790 Pingouin	1991 SF_{1}	Pingouin	September 28, 1991	Kiyosato	S. Otomo	·	4.8 km (3.0 mi)	MPC · JPL
6791	1991 UC_{2}	—	October 29, 1991	Kushiro	S. Ueda, H. Kaneda	·	5.4 km (3.4 mi)	MPC · JPL
6792 Akiyamatakashi	1991 WC	Akiyamatakashi	November 30, 1991	Susono	M. Akiyama, T. Furuta	·	9.1 km (5.7 mi)	MPC · JPL
6793 Palazzolo	1991 YE	Palazzolo	December 30, 1991	Bassano Bresciano	Bresciano, Bassano	LEO	9.9 km (6.2 mi)	MPC · JPL
6794 Masuisakura	1992 DK	Masuisakura	February 26, 1992	Dynic	A. Sugie	·	27 km (17 mi)	MPC · JPL
6795 Örnsköldsvik	1993 FZ_{12}	Örnsköldsvik	March 17, 1993	La Silla	UESAC	·	6.1 km (3.8 mi)	MPC · JPL
6796 Sundsvall	1993 FH_{24}	Sundsvall	March 21, 1993	La Silla	UESAC	PAD	11 km (6.8 mi)	MPC · JPL
6797 Östersund	1993 FG_{25}	Östersund	March 21, 1993	La Silla	UESAC	KOR	10 km (6.2 mi)	MPC · JPL
6798 Couperin	1993 JK_{1}	Couperin	May 14, 1993	La Silla	E. W. Elst	KOR	9.6 km (6.0 mi)	MPC · JPL
6799 Citfiftythree	1993 KM	Citfiftythree	May 17, 1993	Palomar	E. F. Helin	·	9.2 km (5.7 mi)	MPC · JPL
6800 Saragamine	1994 UC	Saragamine	October 29, 1994	Kuma Kogen	A. Nakamura	·	13 km (8.1 mi)	MPC · JPL

== 6801–6900 ==
back to top

Designation			Discovery			Properties		Ref
Permanent	Provisional	Named after	Date	Site	Discoverer(s)	Category	Diam.	Ref
6801 Střekov	1995 UM_{1}	Střekov	October 22, 1995	Kleť	Z. Moravec	·	4.9 km (3.0 mi)	MPC · JPL
6802 Černovice	1995 UQ_{2}	Černovice	October 24, 1995	Kleť	M. Tichý	·	11 km (6.8 mi)	MPC · JPL
6803	1995 UK_{7}	—	October 27, 1995	Kushiro	S. Ueda, H. Kaneda	·	4.8 km (3.0 mi)	MPC · JPL
6804 Maruseppu	1995 WV	Maruseppu	November 16, 1995	Kuma Kogen	A. Nakamura	·	4.7 km (2.9 mi)	MPC · JPL
6805 Abstracta	4600 P-L	Abstracta	September 24, 1960	Palomar	C. J. van Houten, I. van Houten-Groeneveld, T. Gehrels	THM · slow	12 km (7.5 mi)	MPC · JPL
6806 Kaufmann	6048 P-L	Kaufmann	September 24, 1960	Palomar	C. J. van Houten, I. van Houten-Groeneveld, T. Gehrels	SUL	9.0 km (5.6 mi)	MPC · JPL
6807 Brünnow	6568 P-L	Brünnow	September 24, 1960	Palomar	C. J. van Houten, I. van Houten-Groeneveld, T. Gehrels	·	3.1 km (1.9 mi)	MPC · JPL
6808 Plantin	1932 CP	Plantin	February 5, 1932	Heidelberg	K. Reinmuth	·	5.4 km (3.4 mi)	MPC · JPL
6809 Sakuma	1938 DM_{1}	Sakuma	February 20, 1938	Heidelberg	K. Reinmuth	moon	5.6 km (3.5 mi)	MPC · JPL
6810 Juanclariá	1969 GC	Juanclariá	April 9, 1969	El Leoncito	Félix Aguilar Observatory	·	13 km (8.1 mi)	MPC · JPL
6811 Kashcheev	1976 QP	Kashcheev	August 26, 1976	Nauchnij	N. S. Chernykh	NYS	5.1 km (3.2 mi)	MPC · JPL
6812 Robertnelson	1978 VJ_{8}	Robertnelson	November 7, 1978	Palomar	E. F. Helin, S. J. Bus	THM	9.2 km (5.7 mi)	MPC · JPL
6813 Amandahendrix	1978 VV_{9}	Amandahendrix	November 7, 1978	Palomar	E. F. Helin, S. J. Bus	·	13 km (8.1 mi)	MPC · JPL
6814 Steffl	1979 MC_{2}	Steffl	June 25, 1979	Siding Spring	E. F. Helin, S. J. Bus	·	6.8 km (4.2 mi)	MPC · JPL
6815 Mutchler	1979 MM_{5}	Mutchler	June 25, 1979	Siding Spring	E. F. Helin, S. J. Bus	NYS	4.3 km (2.7 mi)	MPC · JPL
6816 Barbcohen	1981 EB_{28}	Barbcohen	March 2, 1981	Siding Spring	S. J. Bus	·	2.9 km (1.8 mi)	MPC · JPL
6817 Pest	1982 BP_{2}	Pest	January 20, 1982	Kleť	A. Mrkos	·	4.2 km (2.6 mi)	MPC · JPL
6818 Sessyu	1983 EM_{1}	Sessyu	March 11, 1983	Kiso	H. Kosai, K. Furukawa	·	5.0 km (3.1 mi)	MPC · JPL
6819 McGarvey	1983 LL	McGarvey	June 14, 1983	Palomar	Smrekar, S.	·	4.7 km (2.9 mi)	MPC · JPL
6820 Buil	1985 XS	Buil	December 13, 1985	Caussols	CERGA	·	7.9 km (4.9 mi)	MPC · JPL
6821 Ranevskaya	1986 SZ_{1}	Ranevskaya	September 29, 1986	Nauchnij	L. G. Karachkina	·	9.5 km (5.9 mi)	MPC · JPL
6822 Horálek	1986 UO	Horálek	October 28, 1986	Kleť	Z. Vávrová	·	5.3 km (3.3 mi)	MPC · JPL
6823	1988 ED_{1}	—	March 12, 1988	Yorii	M. Arai, H. Mori	·	9.3 km (5.8 mi)	MPC · JPL
6824 Mallory	1988 RE_{2}	Mallory	September 8, 1988	Kleť	A. Mrkos	THM	15 km (9.3 mi)	MPC · JPL
6825 Irvine	1988 TJ_{2}	Irvine	October 4, 1988	Kleť	A. Mrkos	·	4.7 km (2.9 mi)	MPC · JPL
6826 Lavoisier	1989 SD_{1}	Lavoisier	September 26, 1989	La Silla	E. W. Elst	KOR	6.5 km (4.0 mi)	MPC · JPL
6827 Wombat	1990 SN_{4}	Wombat	September 27, 1990	Oohira	T. Urata	EUN	7.8 km (4.8 mi)	MPC · JPL
6828 Elbsteel	1990 VC_{1}	Elbsteel	November 12, 1990	Siding Spring	D. I. Steel	·	6.8 km (4.2 mi)	MPC · JPL
6829 Charmawidor	1991 BM_{1}	Charmawidor	January 18, 1991	Haute-Provence	E. W. Elst	KOR	7.3 km (4.5 mi)	MPC · JPL
6830 Johnbackus	1991 JB_{1}	Johnbackus	May 5, 1991	Kiyosato	S. Otomo, O. Muramatsu	·	15 km (9.3 mi)	MPC · JPL
6831	1991 UM_{1}	—	October 28, 1991	Kushiro	S. Ueda, H. Kaneda	·	4.4 km (2.7 mi)	MPC · JPL
6832 Kawabata	1992 FP	Kawabata	March 23, 1992	Kitami	K. Endate, K. Watanabe	(3460)	12 km (7.5 mi)	MPC · JPL
6833	1993 FC_{1}	—	March 19, 1993	Hidaka	Shirai, S., Hayakawa, S.	EUN · slow	6.5 km (4.0 mi)	MPC · JPL
6834 Hunfeld	1993 JH	Hunfeld	May 11, 1993	Nachi-Katsuura	Y. Shimizu, T. Urata	·	9.7 km (6.0 mi)	MPC · JPL
6835 Molfino	1994 HT_{1}	Molfino	April 30, 1994	Stroncone	Santa Lucia	(5)	4.0 km (2.5 mi)	MPC · JPL
6836 Paranal	1994 PW_{5}	Paranal	August 10, 1994	La Silla	E. W. Elst	KOR	7.6 km (4.7 mi)	MPC · JPL
6837 Bressi	1994 XN_{4}	Bressi	December 8, 1994	Kitt Peak	Spacewatch	·	8.3 km (5.2 mi)	MPC · JPL
6838 Okuda	1995 UD_{9}	Okuda	October 30, 1995	Nachi-Katsuura	Y. Shimizu, T. Urata	·	11 km (6.8 mi)	MPC · JPL
6839 Ozenuma	1995 WB_{2}	Ozenuma	November 18, 1995	Oizumi	T. Kobayashi	KOR	10 km (6.2 mi)	MPC · JPL
6840	1995 WW_{5}	—	November 18, 1995	Kushiro	S. Ueda, H. Kaneda	NYS · slow	8.6 km (5.3 mi)	MPC · JPL
6841 Gottfriedkirch	2034 P-L	Gottfriedkirch	September 24, 1960	Palomar	C. J. van Houten, I. van Houten-Groeneveld, T. Gehrels	·	3.8 km (2.4 mi)	MPC · JPL
6842 Krosigk	3016 P-L	Krosigk	September 24, 1960	Palomar	C. J. van Houten, I. van Houten-Groeneveld, T. Gehrels	·	5.8 km (3.6 mi)	MPC · JPL
6843 Heremon	1975 TC_{6}	Heremon	October 9, 1975	McDonald	J. D. Mulholland	·	5.2 km (3.2 mi)	MPC · JPL
6844 Shpak	1975 VR_{5}	Shpak	November 3, 1975	Nauchnij	T. M. Smirnova	slow	4.2 km (2.6 mi)	MPC · JPL
6845 Mansurova	1976 JG_{2}	Mansurova	May 2, 1976	Nauchnij	N. S. Chernykh	BAP	4.8 km (3.0 mi)	MPC · JPL
6846 Kansazan	1976 UG_{15}	Kansazan	October 22, 1976	Kiso	H. Kosai, K. Furukawa	NYS	5.8 km (3.6 mi)	MPC · JPL
6847 Kunz-Hallstein	1977 RL	Kunz-Hallstein	September 5, 1977	La Silla	H.-E. Schuster	PHO	3.7 km (2.3 mi)	MPC · JPL
6848 Casely-Hayford	1978 VG_{5}	Casely-Hayford	November 7, 1978	Palomar	E. F. Helin, S. J. Bus	THM	11 km (6.8 mi)	MPC · JPL
6849 Doloreshuerta	1979 MX_{6}	Doloreshuerta	June 25, 1979	Siding Spring	E. F. Helin, S. J. Bus	V	4.1 km (2.5 mi)	MPC · JPL
6850	1981 QT_{3}	—	August 28, 1981	La Silla	H. Debehogne	·	22 km (14 mi)	MPC · JPL
6851 Chianti	1981 RO_{1}	Chianti	September 1, 1981	La Silla	H. Debehogne	·	2.8 km (1.7 mi)	MPC · JPL
6852 Nannibignami	1985 CN_{2}	Nannibignami	February 14, 1985	La Silla	H. Debehogne	NYS	4.2 km (2.6 mi)	MPC · JPL
6853 Silvanomassaglia	1986 CD_{2}	Silvanomassaglia	February 12, 1986	La Silla	H. Debehogne	·	3.4 km (2.1 mi)	MPC · JPL
6854 Georgewest	1987 UG	Georgewest	October 20, 1987	Anderson Mesa	Zeigler, K. W.	NYS	4.2 km (2.6 mi)	MPC · JPL
6855 Armellini	1989 BG	Armellini	January 29, 1989	Bologna	San Vittore	·	6.7 km (4.2 mi)	MPC · JPL
6856 Bethemmons	1989 EM	Bethemmons	March 5, 1989	Palomar	E. F. Helin	NYS	3.9 km (2.4 mi)	MPC · JPL
6857 Castelli	1990 QQ	Castelli	August 19, 1990	Palomar	E. F. Helin	·	8.3 km (5.2 mi)	MPC · JPL
6858	1990 ST_{10}	—	September 16, 1990	Palomar	H. E. Holt	EUN	6.4 km (4.0 mi)	MPC · JPL
6859 Datemasamune	1991 CZ	Datemasamune	February 13, 1991	Ayashi Station	M. Koishikawa	H	3.8 km (2.4 mi)	MPC · JPL
6860 Sims	1991 CS_{1}	Sims	February 11, 1991	Kiyosato	S. Otomo, O. Muramatsu	THM	11 km (6.8 mi)	MPC · JPL
6861	1991 FA_{3}	—	March 20, 1991	La Silla	H. Debehogne	·	18 km (11 mi)	MPC · JPL
6862 Virgiliomarcon	1991 GL	Virgiliomarcon	April 11, 1991	Bologna	San Vittore	·	23 km (14 mi)	MPC · JPL
6863	1991 PX_{8}	—	August 5, 1991	Palomar	H. E. Holt	·	3.8 km (2.4 mi)	MPC · JPL
6864 Starkenburg	1991 RC_{4}	Starkenburg	September 12, 1991	Tautenburg Observatory	F. Börngen, L. D. Schmadel	·	4.1 km (2.5 mi)	MPC · JPL
6865 Dunkerley	1991 TE_{2}	Dunkerley	October 2, 1991	Yatsugatake	Y. Kushida, O. Muramatsu	·	3.3 km (2.1 mi)	MPC · JPL
6866 Kukai	1992 CO	Kukai	February 12, 1992	Kiyosato	S. Otomo	EOS	13 km (8.1 mi)	MPC · JPL
6867 Kuwano	1992 FP_{1}	Kuwano	March 28, 1992	Kitami	K. Endate, K. Watanabe	·	6.7 km (4.2 mi)	MPC · JPL
6868 Seiyauyeda	1992 HD	Seiyauyeda	April 22, 1992	Yatsugatake	Y. Kushida, O. Muramatsu	·	14 km (8.7 mi)	MPC · JPL
6869 Funada	1992 JP	Funada	May 2, 1992	Kitami	K. Endate, K. Watanabe	URS	23 km (14 mi)	MPC · JPL
6870 Pauldavies	1992 OG	Pauldavies	July 28, 1992	Siding Spring	R. H. McNaught	H	2.5 km (1.6 mi)	MPC · JPL
6871 Verlaine	1993 BE_{8}	Verlaine	January 23, 1993	La Silla	E. W. Elst	·	2.7 km (1.7 mi)	MPC · JPL
6872	1993 CN_{1}	—	February 15, 1993	Kushiro	S. Ueda, H. Kaneda	·	4.4 km (2.7 mi)	MPC · JPL
6873 Tasaka	1993 HT_{1}	Tasaka	April 21, 1993	Kitami	K. Endate, K. Watanabe	·	3.9 km (2.4 mi)	MPC · JPL
6874	1994 JO_{1}	—	May 9, 1994	Siding Spring	G. J. Garradd	·	4.8 km (3.0 mi)	MPC · JPL
6875 Golgi	1994 NG_{1}	Golgi	July 4, 1994	Palomar	E. F. Helin	·	4.2 km (2.6 mi)	MPC · JPL
6876 Beppeforti	1994 RK_{1}	Beppeforti	September 5, 1994	Cima Ekar	A. Boattini, M. Tombelli	V	4.2 km (2.6 mi)	MPC · JPL
6877 Giada	1994 TB_{2}	Giada	October 10, 1994	Colleverde	V. S. Casulli	V	4.7 km (2.9 mi)	MPC · JPL
6878 Isamu	1994 TN_{2}	Isamu	October 2, 1994	Kitami	K. Endate, K. Watanabe	·	8.2 km (5.1 mi)	MPC · JPL
6879 Hyogo	1994 TC_{15}	Hyogo	October 14, 1994	Sengamine	K. Itō	·	19 km (12 mi)	MPC · JPL
6880 Hayamiyu	1994 TG_{15}	Hayamiyu	October 13, 1994	Kiyosato	S. Otomo	·	9.4 km (5.8 mi)	MPC · JPL
6881 Shifutsu	1994 UP	Shifutsu	October 31, 1994	Oizumi	T. Kobayashi	KOR	6.0 km (3.7 mi)	MPC · JPL
6882 Sormano	1995 CC_{1}	Sormano	February 5, 1995	Sormano	P. Sicoli, Giuliani, V.	MAR	8.1 km (5.0 mi)	MPC · JPL
6883 Hiuchigatake	1996 AF	Hiuchigatake	January 10, 1996	Oizumi	T. Kobayashi	THM	13 km (8.1 mi)	MPC · JPL
6884 Takeshisato	9521 P-L	Takeshisato	October 17, 1960	Palomar	C. J. van Houten, I. van Houten-Groeneveld, T. Gehrels	·	3.3 km (2.1 mi)	MPC · JPL
6885 Nitardy	9570 P-L	Nitardy	October 17, 1960	Palomar	C. J. van Houten, I. van Houten-Groeneveld, T. Gehrels	·	3.2 km (2.0 mi)	MPC · JPL
6886 Grote	1942 CG	Grote	February 11, 1942	Turku	L. Oterma	RAF	8.4 km (5.2 mi)	MPC · JPL
6887 Hasuo	1951 WH	Hasuo	November 24, 1951	Nice	M. Laugier	·	4.3 km (2.7 mi)	MPC · JPL
6888	1971 BD_{3}	—	January 27, 1971	Cerro El Roble	C. Torres, Petit, J.	·	5.7 km (3.5 mi)	MPC · JPL
6889	1971 RA	—	September 15, 1971	Cerro El Roble	C. Torres, Petit, J.	·	3.9 km (2.4 mi)	MPC · JPL
6890 Savinykh	1975 RP	Savinykh	September 3, 1975	Nauchnij	L. I. Chernykh	THM	19 km (12 mi)	MPC · JPL
6891 Triconia	1976 SA	Triconia	September 23, 1976	Harvard Observatory	Harvard Observatory	·	8.3 km (5.2 mi)	MPC · JPL
6892 Lana	1978 VG_{8}	Lana	November 7, 1978	Palomar	E. F. Helin, S. J. Bus	·	3.4 km (2.1 mi)	MPC · JPL
6893 Sanderson	1983 RS_{3}	Sanderson	September 2, 1983	La Silla	H. Debehogne	V	3.9 km (2.4 mi)	MPC · JPL
6894 Macreid	1986 RE_{2}	Macreid	September 5, 1986	Palomar	E. F. Helin	HNS	7.7 km (4.8 mi)	MPC · JPL
6895	1987 DG_{6}	—	February 23, 1987	La Silla	H. Debehogne	MIS	14 km (8.7 mi)	MPC · JPL
6896	1987 RE_{1}	—	September 13, 1987	La Silla	H. Debehogne	·	4.2 km (2.6 mi)	MPC · JPL
6897 Tabei	1987 VQ	Tabei	November 15, 1987	Kleť	A. Mrkos	NYS	4.5 km (2.8 mi)	MPC · JPL
6898 Saint-Marys	1988 LE	Saint-Marys	June 8, 1988	Palomar	C. S. Shoemaker	EUN	8.4 km (5.2 mi)	MPC · JPL
6899 Nancychabot	1988 RP_{10}	Nancychabot	September 14, 1988	Cerro Tololo	S. J. Bus	KOR	6.3 km (3.9 mi)	MPC · JPL
6900	1988 XD_{1}	—	December 2, 1988	Yorii	M. Arai, H. Mori	·	3.3 km (2.1 mi)	MPC · JPL

== 6901–7000 ==
back to top

Designation			Discovery			Properties		Ref
Permanent	Provisional	Named after	Date	Site	Discoverer(s)	Category	Diam.	Ref
6901 Roybishop	1989 PA	Roybishop	August 2, 1989	Palomar	C. S. Shoemaker, E. M. Shoemaker	H	5.0 km (3.1 mi)	MPC · JPL
6902 Hideoasada	1989 US_{3}	Hideoasada	October 26, 1989	Kani	Y. Mizuno, T. Furuta	·	10 km (6.2 mi)	MPC · JPL
6903	1989 XM	—	December 2, 1989	Gekko	Y. Oshima	KOR	7.9 km (4.9 mi)	MPC · JPL
6904 McGill	1990 QW_{1}	McGill	August 22, 1990	Palomar	H. E. Holt	·	6.1 km (3.8 mi)	MPC · JPL
6905 Miyazaki	1990 TW	Miyazaki	October 15, 1990	Kitami	K. Endate, K. Watanabe	EUN	13 km (8.1 mi)	MPC · JPL
6906 Johnmills	1990 WC	Johnmills	November 19, 1990	Siding Spring	R. H. McNaught	CLO	11 km (6.8 mi)	MPC · JPL
6907 Harryford	1990 WE	Harryford	November 19, 1990	Siding Spring	R. H. McNaught	·	12 km (7.5 mi)	MPC · JPL
6908 Kunimoto	1990 WB_{3}	Kunimoto	November 24, 1990	Kitami	K. Endate, K. Watanabe	·	6.4 km (4.0 mi)	MPC · JPL
6909 Levison	1991 BY_{2}	Levison	January 19, 1991	Palomar	C. S. Shoemaker, E. M. Shoemaker	T_{j} (2.92)	7.8 km (4.8 mi)	MPC · JPL
6910 Ikeguchi	1991 FJ	Ikeguchi	March 17, 1991	Kiyosato	S. Otomo, O. Muramatsu	EOS	10 km (6.2 mi)	MPC · JPL
6911 Nancygreen	1991 GN	Nancygreen	April 10, 1991	Palomar	E. F. Helin	H	2.5 km (1.6 mi)	MPC · JPL
6912 Grimm	1991 GQ_{2}	Grimm	April 8, 1991	La Silla	E. W. Elst	·	11 km (6.8 mi)	MPC · JPL
6913 Yukawa	1991 UT_{3}	Yukawa	October 31, 1991	Kitami	K. Endate, K. Watanabe	·	3.3 km (2.1 mi)	MPC · JPL
6914 Becquerel	1992 GZ	Becquerel	April 3, 1992	Palomar	C. S. Shoemaker, D. H. Levy, H. E. Holt	·	9.0 km (5.6 mi)	MPC · JPL
6915	1992 HH	—	April 30, 1992	Yatsugatake	Y. Kushida, O. Muramatsu	·	7.1 km (4.4 mi)	MPC · JPL
6916 Lewispearce	1992 OJ	Lewispearce	July 27, 1992	Siding Spring	R. H. McNaught	·	12 km (7.5 mi)	MPC · JPL
6917 Assateague	1993 FR_{2}	Assateague	March 29, 1993	Kiyosato	S. Otomo	·	4.4 km (2.7 mi)	MPC · JPL
6918 Manaslu	1993 FV_{3}	Manaslu	March 20, 1993	Nyukasa	M. Hirasawa, S. Suzuki	NYS	5.2 km (3.2 mi)	MPC · JPL
6919 Tomonaga	1993 HP	Tomonaga	April 16, 1993	Kitami	K. Endate, K. Watanabe	·	4.1 km (2.5 mi)	MPC · JPL
6920 Esaki	1993 JE	Esaki	May 14, 1993	Kitami	K. Endate, K. Watanabe	·	5.0 km (3.1 mi)	MPC · JPL
6921 Janejacobs	1993 JJ	Janejacobs	May 14, 1993	Kushiro	S. Ueda, H. Kaneda	·	5.3 km (3.3 mi)	MPC · JPL
6922 Yasushi	1993 KY_{1}	Yasushi	May 27, 1993	Kiyosato	S. Otomo	·	4.5 km (2.8 mi)	MPC · JPL
6923 Borzacchini	1993 SD	Borzacchini	September 16, 1993	Stroncone	Santa Lucia	EOS	6.8 km (4.2 mi)	MPC · JPL
6924 Fukui	1993 TP	Fukui	October 8, 1993	Kitami	K. Endate, K. Watanabe	CYB	30 km (19 mi)	MPC · JPL
6925 Susumu	1993 UW_{2}	Susumu	October 24, 1993	Geisei	T. Seki	·	23 km (14 mi)	MPC · JPL
6926	1994 RO_{11}	—	September 1, 1994	Kushiro	S. Ueda, H. Kaneda	EUN	6.7 km (4.2 mi)	MPC · JPL
6927 Tonegawa	1994 TE_{1}	Tonegawa	October 2, 1994	Kitami	K. Endate, K. Watanabe	·	6.2 km (3.9 mi)	MPC · JPL
6928 Lanna	1994 TM_{3}	Lanna	October 11, 1994	Kleť	M. Tichý	·	6.7 km (4.2 mi)	MPC · JPL
6929 Misto	1994 UE	Misto	October 31, 1994	Colleverde	V. S. Casulli	GEF	7.3 km (4.5 mi)	MPC · JPL
6930	1994 VJ_{3}	—	November 7, 1994	Kushiro	S. Ueda, H. Kaneda	THM	11 km (6.8 mi)	MPC · JPL
6931 Kenzaburo	1994 VP_{6}	Kenzaburo	November 4, 1994	Kitami	K. Endate, K. Watanabe	EOS	9.8 km (6.1 mi)	MPC · JPL
6932 Tanigawadake	1994 YK	Tanigawadake	December 24, 1994	Oizumi	T. Kobayashi	·	5.2 km (3.2 mi)	MPC · JPL
6933 Azumayasan	1994 YW	Azumayasan	December 28, 1994	Oizumi	T. Kobayashi	·	12 km (7.5 mi)	MPC · JPL
6934	1994 YN_{2}	—	December 25, 1994	Kushiro	S. Ueda, H. Kaneda	·	12 km (7.5 mi)	MPC · JPL
6935 Morisot	4524 P-L	Morisot	September 24, 1960	Palomar	C. J. van Houten, I. van Houten-Groeneveld, T. Gehrels	·	3.6 km (2.2 mi)	MPC · JPL
6936 Cassatt	6573 P-L	Cassatt	September 24, 1960	Palomar	C. J. van Houten, I. van Houten-Groeneveld, T. Gehrels	·	5.5 km (3.4 mi)	MPC · JPL
6937 Valadon	1010 T-2	Valadon	September 29, 1973	Palomar	C. J. van Houten, I. van Houten-Groeneveld, T. Gehrels	·	11 km (6.8 mi)	MPC · JPL
6938 Soniaterk	5140 T-2	Soniaterk	September 25, 1973	Palomar	C. J. van Houten, I. van Houten-Groeneveld, T. Gehrels	EOS	10 km (6.2 mi)	MPC · JPL
6939 Lestone	1952 SW_{1}	Lestone	September 22, 1952	Mount Wilson	L. E. Cunningham	EUN	5.3 km (3.3 mi)	MPC · JPL
6940	1972 HL_{1}	—	April 19, 1972	Cerro El Roble	C. Torres	·	3.0 km (1.9 mi)	MPC · JPL
6941 Dalgarno	1976 YA	Dalgarno	December 16, 1976	Harvard Observatory	Harvard Observatory	·	8.1 km (5.0 mi)	MPC · JPL
6942 Yurigulyaev	1976 YB_{2}	Yurigulyaev	December 16, 1976	Nauchnij	L. I. Chernykh	·	6.0 km (3.7 mi)	MPC · JPL
6943 Moretto	1978 VR_{4}	Moretto	November 7, 1978	Palomar	E. F. Helin, S. J. Bus	·	4.1 km (2.5 mi)	MPC · JPL
6944 Elaineowens	1979 MR_{3}	Elaineowens	June 25, 1979	Siding Spring	E. F. Helin, S. J. Bus	V	3.4 km (2.1 mi)	MPC · JPL
6945 Dahlgren	1980 FZ_{3}	Dahlgren	March 16, 1980	La Silla	C.-I. Lagerkvist	·	4.1 km (2.5 mi)	MPC · JPL
6946	1980 RX_{1}	—	September 15, 1980	Haute-Provence	H. Debehogne, L. Houziaux	·	4.9 km (3.0 mi)	MPC · JPL
6947 Andrewdavis	1981 ET_{8}	Andrewdavis	March 1, 1981	Siding Spring	S. J. Bus	·	3.8 km (2.4 mi)	MPC · JPL
6948 Gounelle	1981 ET_{22}	Gounelle	March 2, 1981	Siding Spring	S. J. Bus	NYS	3.6 km (2.2 mi)	MPC · JPL
6949 Zissell	1982 RZ	Zissell	September 11, 1982	Harvard Observatory	Oak Ridge Observatory	PHO	8.2 km (5.1 mi)	MPC · JPL
6950 Simonek	1982 YQ	Simonek	December 22, 1982	Haute-Provence	F. Dossin	EUN	7.4 km (4.6 mi)	MPC · JPL
6951	1985 DW_{1}	—	February 16, 1985	La Silla	H. Debehogne	·	10 km (6.2 mi)	MPC · JPL
6952 Niccolò	1986 JT	Niccolò	May 4, 1986	Anderson Mesa	E. Bowell	·	16 km (9.9 mi)	MPC · JPL
6953 Davepierce	1986 PC_{1}	Davepierce	August 1, 1986	Palomar	E. F. Helin	THM	16 km (9.9 mi)	MPC · JPL
6954 Potemkin	1987 RB_{6}	Potemkin	September 4, 1987	Nauchnij	L. V. Zhuravleva	·	4.0 km (2.5 mi)	MPC · JPL
6955 Ekaterina	1987 SP_{15}	Ekaterina	September 25, 1987	Nauchnij	L. V. Zhuravleva	THM	16 km (9.9 mi)	MPC · JPL
6956 Holbach	1988 CX_{3}	Holbach	February 13, 1988	La Silla	E. W. Elst	V	3.6 km (2.2 mi)	MPC · JPL
6957	1988 HA	—	April 16, 1988	Kushiro	S. Ueda, H. Kaneda	·	6.2 km (3.9 mi)	MPC · JPL
6958	1988 TX_{1}	—	October 13, 1988	Kushiro	S. Ueda, H. Kaneda	EOS	8.9 km (5.5 mi)	MPC · JPL
6959 Mikkelkocha	1988 VD_{1}	Mikkelkocha	November 3, 1988	Brorfelde	P. Jensen	·	9.8 km (6.1 mi)	MPC · JPL
6960	1989 AL_{5}	—	January 4, 1989	Siding Spring	R. H. McNaught	THM	16 km (9.9 mi)	MPC · JPL
6961 Ashitaka	1989 KA	Ashitaka	May 26, 1989	Mishima	M. Akiyama, T. Furuta	·	4.6 km (2.9 mi)	MPC · JPL
6962 Summerscience	1990 OT	Summerscience	July 22, 1990	Palomar	E. F. Helin	V	3.7 km (2.3 mi)	MPC · JPL
6963	1990 OQ_{3}	—	July 27, 1990	Palomar	H. E. Holt	·	4.6 km (2.9 mi)	MPC · JPL
6964 Kunihiko	1990 TL_{1}	Kunihiko	October 15, 1990	Kitami	K. Endate, K. Watanabe	·	4.7 km (2.9 mi)	MPC · JPL
6965 Niyodogawa	1990 VS_{2}	Niyodogawa	November 11, 1990	Geisei	T. Seki	·	8.5 km (5.3 mi)	MPC · JPL
6966 Vietoris	1991 RD_{5}	Vietoris	September 13, 1991	Tautenburg Observatory	L. D. Schmadel, F. Börngen	·	3.6 km (2.2 mi)	MPC · JPL
6967	1991 VJ_{3}	—	November 11, 1991	Toyota	K. Suzuki, T. Urata	·	4.4 km (2.7 mi)	MPC · JPL
6968	1991 VX_{3}	—	November 11, 1991	Kushiro	S. Ueda, H. Kaneda	·	4.2 km (2.6 mi)	MPC · JPL
6969 Santaro	1991 VF_{5}	Santaro	November 4, 1991	Kiyosato	S. Otomo	·	6.2 km (3.9 mi)	MPC · JPL
6970 Saigusa	1992 AL_{1}	Saigusa	January 10, 1992	Kiyosato	S. Otomo	·	4.6 km (2.9 mi)	MPC · JPL
6971 Omogokei	1992 CT	Omogokei	February 8, 1992	Geisei	T. Seki	KOR	6.8 km (4.2 mi)	MPC · JPL
6972 Helvetius	1992 GY_{3}	Helvetius	April 4, 1992	La Silla	E. W. Elst	·	6.9 km (4.3 mi)	MPC · JPL
6973 Karajan	1992 HK	Karajan	April 27, 1992	Kushiro	S. Ueda, H. Kaneda	·	7.8 km (4.8 mi)	MPC · JPL
6974 Solti	1992 MC	Solti	June 27, 1992	Palomar	H. E. Holt	MAR · moon	9.8 km (6.1 mi)	MPC · JPL
6975 Hiroaki	1992 QM	Hiroaki	August 25, 1992	Kiyosato	S. Otomo	·	18 km (11 mi)	MPC · JPL
6976 Kanatsu	1993 KD_{2}	Kanatsu	May 23, 1993	Kiyosato	S. Otomo	·	5.5 km (3.4 mi)	MPC · JPL
6977 Jaucourt	1993 OZ_{4}	Jaucourt	July 20, 1993	La Silla	E. W. Elst	·	4.0 km (2.5 mi)	MPC · JPL
6978 Hironaka	1993 RD	Hironaka	September 12, 1993	Kitami	K. Endate, K. Watanabe	RAF	4.9 km (3.0 mi)	MPC · JPL
6979 Shigefumi	1993 RH	Shigefumi	September 12, 1993	Kitami	K. Endate, K. Watanabe	·	8.2 km (5.1 mi)	MPC · JPL
6980 Kyusakamoto	1993 SV_{1}	Kyusakamoto	September 16, 1993	Kitami	K. Endate, K. Watanabe	KOR	8.8 km (5.5 mi)	MPC · JPL
6981 Chirman	1993 TK_{2}	Chirman	October 15, 1993	Bassano Bresciano	Bresciano, Bassano	EUN	7.0 km (4.3 mi)	MPC · JPL
6982 Cesarchavez	1993 UA_{3}	Cesarchavez	October 16, 1993	Palomar	E. F. Helin	EUN	7.9 km (4.9 mi)	MPC · JPL
6983 Komatsusakyo	1993 YC	Komatsusakyo	December 17, 1993	Oizumi	T. Kobayashi	·	27 km (17 mi)	MPC · JPL
6984 Lewiscarroll	1994 AO	Lewiscarroll	January 4, 1994	Fujieda	Shiozawa, H., T. Urata	T_{j} (2.95) · 3:2	48 km (30 mi)	MPC · JPL
6985	1994 UF_{2}	—	October 31, 1994	Kushiro	S. Ueda, H. Kaneda	·	3.7 km (2.3 mi)	MPC · JPL
6986 Asamayama	1994 WE	Asamayama	November 24, 1994	Oizumi	T. Kobayashi	KOR	5.5 km (3.4 mi)	MPC · JPL
6987 Onioshidashi	1994 WZ	Onioshidashi	November 25, 1994	Oizumi	T. Kobayashi	AGN	5.7 km (3.5 mi)	MPC · JPL
6988	1994 WE_{3}	—	November 28, 1994	Kushiro	S. Ueda, H. Kaneda	·	7.7 km (4.8 mi)	MPC · JPL
6989 Hoshinosato	1994 XH_{1}	Hoshinosato	December 6, 1994	Oizumi	T. Kobayashi	EOS	10 km (6.2 mi)	MPC · JPL
6990 Toya	1994 XU_{4}	Toya	December 9, 1994	Oizumi	T. Kobayashi	THM	14 km (8.7 mi)	MPC · JPL
6991 Chichibu	1995 AX	Chichibu	January 6, 1995	Oizumi	T. Kobayashi	·	4.5 km (2.8 mi)	MPC · JPL
6992 Minano-machi	1995 BT_{1}	Minano-machi	January 27, 1995	Oizumi	T. Kobayashi	EOS	14 km (8.7 mi)	MPC · JPL
6993	1995 BJ_{4}	—	January 28, 1995	Kushiro	S. Ueda, H. Kaneda	·	12 km (7.5 mi)	MPC · JPL
6994	1995 BV_{4}	—	January 28, 1995	Kushiro	S. Ueda, H. Kaneda	·	6.4 km (4.0 mi)	MPC · JPL
6995 Minoyama	1996 BZ_{1}	Minoyama	January 24, 1996	Oizumi	T. Kobayashi	slow	7.3 km (4.5 mi)	MPC · JPL
6996 Alvensleben	2222 T-2	Alvensleben	September 29, 1973	Palomar	C. J. van Houten, I. van Houten-Groeneveld, T. Gehrels	CYB	19 km (12 mi)	MPC · JPL
6997 Laomedon	3104 T-3	Laomedon	October 16, 1977	Palomar	C. J. van Houten, I. van Houten-Groeneveld, T. Gehrels	L5	38 km (24 mi)	MPC · JPL
6998 Tithonus	3108 T-3	Tithonus	October 16, 1977	Palomar	C. J. van Houten, I. van Houten-Groeneveld, T. Gehrels	L5	28 km (17 mi)	MPC · JPL
6999 Meitner	4379 T-3	Meitner	October 16, 1977	Palomar	C. J. van Houten, I. van Houten-Groeneveld, T. Gehrels	(2076)	2.9 km (1.8 mi)	MPC · JPL
7000 Curie	1939 VD	Curie	November 6, 1939	Uccle	F. Rigaux	·	6.5 km (4.0 mi)	MPC · JPL

back to top

== See also ==
- Meanings of minor-planet names: 6001–7000
