= List of named minor planets: 7000–7999 =

This is a partial list of named minor planets in numerical order. It contains a total of 779 entries as of 9 July 2026. Minor planets for which no article exist are displayed in grey color and redirect to the list of minor planets (see List of minor planets § Main index).

== From 7,000 to 7,999 ==
- 7000 Curie
- 7001 Noether
- 7002 Bronshten
- 7003 Zoyamironova
- 7004 Markthiemens
- 7005 Henninghaack
- 7006 Folco
- 7007 Timjull
- 7008 Pavlov
- 7009 Hume
- 7010 Locke
- 7011 Worley
- 7012 Hobbes
- 7013 Trachet
- 7014 Nietzsche
- 7015 Schopenhauer
- 7016 Conandoyle
- 7017 Uradowan
- 7019 Tagayuichan
- 7020 Yourcenar
- 7021 Tomiokamachi
- 7023 Heiankyo
- 7024 Impey
- 7026 Gabrielasilang
- 7027 Toshihanda
- 7028 Tachikawa
- 7030 Colombini
- 7031 Kazumiyoshioka
- 7032 Hitchcock
- 7035 Gomi
- 7036 Kentarohirata
- 7037 Davidlean
- 7038 Tokorozawa
- 7039 Yamagata
- 7040 Harwood
- 7041 Nantucket
- 7042 Carver
- 7043 Godart
- 7046 Reshetnev
- 7047 Lundström
- 7048 Chaussidon
- 7049 Meibom
- 7050 Shanekelly
- 7051 Sean
- 7052 Octaviabutler
- 7054 Brehm
- 7055 Fabiopagan
- 7056 Kierkegaard
- 7057 Al-Fārābī
- 7058 Al-Ṭūsī
- 7059 Van Dokkum
- 7060 Al-ʻIjliya
- 7061 Pieri
- 7062 Meslier
- 7063 Johnmichell
- 7064 Montesquieu
- 7065 Fredschaaf
- 7066 Nessus
- 7067 Kiyose
- 7068 Minowa
- 7072 Beijingdaxue
- 7073 Rudbelia
- 7074 Muckea
- 7075 Sadovnichij
- 7076 Divnýjanko
- 7077 Shermanschultz
- 7078 Unojönsson
- 7079 Baghdad
- 7081 Ludibunda
- 7082 La Serena
- 7083 Kant
- 7085 Franksienkiewicz
- 7086 Bopp
- 7087 Lewotsky
- 7088 Ishtar
- 7091 Maryfields
- 7092 Cadmus
- 7093 Jonleake
- 7094 Godaisan
- 7095 Lamettrie
- 7096 Napier
- 7097 Yatsuka
- 7098 Réaumur
- 7099 Feuerbach
- 7100 Martin Luther
- 7101 Haritina
- 7102 Neilbone
- 7103 Wichmann
- 7104 Manyousyu
- 7105 Yousyozan
- 7106 Kondakov
- 7107 Peiser
- 7108 Nefedov
- 7109 Heine
- 7110 Johnpearse
- 7112 Ghislaine
- 7113 Ostapbender
- 7114 Weinek
- 7115 Franciscuszeno
- 7116 Mentall
- 7117 Claudius
- 7118 Kuklov
- 7119 Hiera
- 7120 Davidgavine
- 7121 Busch
- 7122 Iwasaki
- 7124 Glinos
- 7125 Eitarodate
- 7126 Cureau
- 7127 Stifter
- 7128 Misawa
- 7130 Klepper
- 7131 Longtom
- 7132 Casulli
- 7133 Kasahara
- 7134 Ikeuchisatoru
- 7136 Yokohasuo
- 7137 Ageo
- 7139 Tsubokawa
- 7140 Osaki
- 7141 Bettarini
- 7142 Spinoza
- 7143 Haramura
- 7144 Dossobuono
- 7145 Linzexu
- 7146 Konradin
- 7147 Feijth
- 7148 Reinholdbien
- 7149 Bernie
- 7150 McKellar
- 7152 Euneus
- 7153 Vladzakharov
- 7154 Zhangmaolin
- 7156 Flaviofusipecci
- 7157 Lofgren
- 7158 IRTF
- 7159 Bobjoseph
- 7160 Tokunaga
- 7161 Golitsyn
- 7162 Sidwell
- 7163 Barenboim
- 7164 Babadzhanov
- 7165 Pendleton
- 7166 Kennedy
- 7167 Laupheim
- 7169 Linda
- 7170 Livesey
- 7171 Arthurkraus
- 7172 Multatuli
- 7173 Sepkoski
- 7174 Semois
- 7175 Janegoodall
- 7176 Kuniji
- 7177 Melvyntaylor
- 7178 Ikuookamoto
- 7179 Gassendi
- 7182 Robinvaughan
- 7186 Tomioka
- 7187 Isobe
- 7188 Yoshii
- 7189 Kuniko
- 7192 Cieletespace
- 7193 Yamaoka
- 7194 Susanrose
- 7195 Danboice
- 7196 Baroni
- 7197 Pieroangela
- 7198 Montelupo
- 7199 Brianza
- 7201 Kuritariku
- 7202 Kigoshi
- 7203 Sigeki
- 7204 Ondřejov
- 7205 Sadanori
- 7206 Shiki
- 7207 Hammurabi
- 7208 Ashurbanipal
- 7209 Cyrus
- 7210 Darius
- 7211 Xerxes
- 7212 Artaxerxes
- 7213 Conae
- 7214 Anticlus
- 7215 Gerhard
- 7216 Ishkov
- 7217 Dacke
- 7218 Skácel
- 7219 Satterwhite
- 7220 Philnicholson
- 7221 Sallaba
- 7222 Alekperov
- 7223 Dolgorukij
- 7224 Vesnina
- 7225 Huntress
- 7226 Kryl
- 7228 MacGillivray
- 7229 Tonimoore
- 7230 Lutz
- 7231 Porco
- 7232 Nabokov
- 7233 Majella
- 7235 Hitsuzan
- 7237 Vickyhamilton
- 7238 Kobori
- 7239 Mobberley
- 7240 Hasebe
- 7241 Kuroda
- 7242 Okyudo
- 7244 Villa-Lobos
- 7247 Robertstirling
- 7248 Älvsjö
- 7250 Kinoshita
- 7251 Kuwabara
- 7252 Kakegawa
- 7253 Nara
- 7254 Kuratani
- 7256 Bonhoeffer
- 7257 Yoshiya
- 7258 Pettarin
- 7259 Gaithersburg
- 7260 Metelli
- 7261 Yokootakeo
- 7262 Sofue
- 7263 Takayamada
- 7264 Hirohatanaka
- 7265 Edithmüller
- 7266 Trefftz
- 7267 Victormeen
- 7268 Chigorin
- 7269 Alprokhorov
- 7270 Punkin
- 7271 Doroguntsov
- 7272 Darbydyar
- 7273 Garyhuss
- 7274 Washioyama
- 7275 Earlcarpenter
- 7276 Maymie
- 7277 Klass
- 7278 Shtokolov
- 7279 Hagfors
- 7280 Bergengruen
- 7285 Seggewiss
- 7287 Yokokurayama
- 7289 Kamegamori
- 7290 Johnrather
- 7291 Hyakutake
- 7292 Prosperin
- 7293 Kazuyuki
- 7294 Barbaraakey
- 7295 Brozović
- 7296 Lamarck
- 7298 Matudaira-gou
- 7299 Indiawadkins
- 7300 Yoshisada
- 7301 Matsuitakafumi
- 7304 Namiki
- 7305 Ossakajusto
- 7306 Panizon
- 7307 Takei
- 7308 Hattori
- 7309 Shinkawakami
- 7311 Hildehan
- 7313 Pisano
- 7314 Pevsner
- 7315 Kolbe
- 7316 Hajdú
- 7317 Cabot
- 7318 Dyukov
- 7319 Katterfeld
- 7320 Potter
- 7321 Minervahoyt
- 7322 Lavrentina
- 7323 Robersomma
- 7324 Carret
- 7326 Tedbunch
- 7327 Crawford
- 7328 Casanova
- 7329 Bettadotto
- 7330 Annelemaître
- 7331 Balindblad
- 7332 Ponrepo
- 7333 Bec-Borsenberger
- 7334 Sciurus
- 7336 Saunders
- 7342 Uchinoura
- 7343 Ockeghem
- 7344 Summerfield
- 7345 Happer
- 7346 Boulanger
- 7349 Ernestmaes
- 7351 Yoshidamichi
- 7352 Hypsenor
- 7353 Kazuya
- 7354 Ishiguro
- 7355 Bottke
- 7356 Casagrande
- 7358 Oze
- 7359 Messier
- 7360 Moberg
- 7361 Endres
- 7362 Rogerbyrd
- 7363 Esquibel
- 7364 Otonkučera
- 7365 Sejong
- 7366 Agata
- 7367 Giotto
- 7368 Haldancohn
- 7369 Gavrilin
- 7370 Krasnogolovets
- 7371 El-Baz
- 7372 Emimar
- 7373 Stashis
- 7376 Jefftaylor
- 7377 Pizzarello
- 7378 Herbertpalme
- 7379 Naoyaimae
- 7381 Mamontov
- 7382 Bozhenkova
- 7383 Lassovszky
- 7385 Aktsynovia
- 7386 Paulpellas
- 7387 Malbil
- 7388 Marcomorelli
- 7389 Michelcombes
- 7390 Kundera
- 7391 Strouhal
- 7392 Kowalski
- 7393 Luginbuhl
- 7394 Xanthomalitia
- 7396 Rosa-Brusin
- 7398 Walsh
- 7399 Somme
- 7400 Lenau
- 7401 Toynbee
- 7403 Choustník
- 7408 Yoshihide
- 7410 Kawazoe
- 7412 Linnaeus
- 7413 Galibina
- 7414 Bosch
- 7415 Susumuimoto
- 7416 Linnankoski
- 7418 Akasegawa
- 7420 Buffon
- 7421 Kusaka
- 7425 Lessing
- 7428 Abekuniomi
- 7429 Hoshikawa
- 7430 Kogure
- 7431 Jettaguilar
- 7433 Pellegrini
- 7434 Osaka
- 7435 Sagamihara
- 7436 Kuroiwa
- 7437 Torricelli
- 7438 Misakatouge
- 7439 Tetsufuse
- 7440 Závist
- 7441 Láska
- 7442 Inouehideo
- 7443 Tsumura
- 7445 Trajanus
- 7446 Hadrianus
- 7447 Marcusaurelius
- 7448 Pöllath
- 7449 Döllen
- 7450 Shilling
- 7451 Verbitskaya
- 7452 Izabelyuria
- 7453 Slovtsov
- 7454 Kevinrighter
- 7455 Podosek
- 7456 Doressoundiram
- 7457 Veselov
- 7459 Gilbertofranco
- 7460 Julienicoles
- 7461 Kachmokiam
- 7462 Grenoble
- 7463 Oukawamine
- 7464 Vipera
- 7465 Munkanber
- 7468 Anfimov
- 7469 Krikalev
- 7470 Jabberwock
- 7472 Kumakiri
- 7475 Kaizuka
- 7476 Ogilsbie
- 7477 Conversiluca
- 7478 Hasse
- 7480 Norwan
- 7481 San Marcello
- 7483 Sekitakakazu
- 7484 Dogo Onsen
- 7485 Changchun
- 7486 Hamabe
- 7487 Toshitanaka
- 7488 Robertpaul
- 7489 Oribe
- 7490 Babička
- 7491 Linzerag
- 7492 Kačenka
- 7493 Hirzo
- 7494 Xiwanggongcheng
- 7495 Feynman
- 7496 Miroslavholub
- 7497 Guangcaishiye
- 7498 Blaník
- 7499 L'Aquila
- 7500 Sassi
- 7501 Farra
- 7502 Arakida
- 7504 Kawakita
- 7505 Furusho
- 7506 Lub
- 7507 Israel
- 7508 Icke
- 7509 Gamzatov
- 7511 Patcassen
- 7512 Monicalazzarin
- 7515 Marrucino
- 7516 Kranjc
- 7517 Alisondoane
- 7519 Paulcook
- 7521 Wylezalek
- 7525 Kiyohira
- 7526 Ohtsuka
- 7527 Marples
- 7528 Huskvarna
- 7529 Vagnozzi
- 7530 Mizusawa
- 7531 Pecorelli
- 7532 Pelhřimov
- 7533 Seiraiji
- 7536 Fahrenheit
- 7537 Solvay
- 7538 Zenbei
- 7541 Nieuwenhuis
- 7542 Johnpond
- 7543 Prylis
- 7544 Tipografiyanauka
- 7545 Smaklösa
- 7546 Meriam
- 7547 Martinnakata
- 7548 Engström
- 7549 Woodard
- 7550 Woolum
- 7551 Edstolper
- 7552 Sephton
- 7553 Buie
- 7554 Johnspencer
- 7555 Venvolkov
- 7556 Perinaldo
- 7558 Yurlov
- 7559 Kirstinemeyer
- 7560 Spudis
- 7561 Patrickmichel
- 7562 Kagiroino-Oka
- 7564 Gokumenon
- 7565 Zipfel
- 7571 Weisse Rose
- 7572 Znokai
- 7573 Basfifty
- 7575 Kimuraseiji
- 7578 Georgböhm
- 7580 Schwabhausen
- 7581 Yudovich
- 7583 Rosegger
- 7584 Ossietzky
- 7586 Bismarck
- 7587 Weckmann
- 7590 Aterui
- 7592 Takinemachi
- 7593 Cernuschi
- 7594 Shotaro
- 7595 Växjö
- 7596 Yumi
- 7597 Shigemi
- 7599 Munari
- 7600 Vacchi
- 7602 Yidaeam
- 7603 Salopia
- 7604 Kridsadaporn
- 7605 Cindygraber
- 7607 Billmerline
- 7608 Telegramia
- 7610 Sudbury
- 7611 Hashitatsu
- 7613 ʻAkikiki
- 7614 Masatomi
- 7616 Sadako
- 7618 Gotoyukichi
- 7620 Willaert
- 7621 Sweelinck
- 7622 Pergolesi
- 7623 Stamitz
- 7624 Gluck
- 7625 Louisspohr
- 7626 Iafe
- 7627 Wakenokiyomaro
- 7628 Evgenifedorov
- 7629 Foros
- 7630 Yidumduma
- 7631 Vokrouhlický
- 7632 Stanislav
- 7633 Volodymyr
- 7634 Shizutani-Kou
- 7635 Carolinesmith
- 7636 Comba
- 7638 Gladman
- 7639 Offutt
- 7640 Marzari
- 7641 Cteatus
- 7644 Cslewis
- 7645 Pons
- 7647 Etrépigny
- 7648 Tomboles
- 7649 Bougainville
- 7650 Kaname
- 7651 Villeneuve
- 7655 Adamries
- 7656 Joemontani
- 7657 Jefflarsen
- 7660 Alexanderwilson
- 7661 Reincken
- 7664 Namahage
- 7665 Putignano
- 7666 Keyaki
- 7668 Mizunotakao
- 7669 Malše
- 7670 Kabeláč
- 7671 Albis
- 7672 Hawking
- 7673 Inohara
- 7674 Kasuga
- 7675 Gorizia
- 7677 Sawa
- 7678 Onoda
- 7679 Asiago
- 7680 Cari
- 7681 Chenjingrun
- 7682 Miura
- 7683 Wuwenjun
- 7684 Marioferrero
- 7686 Wolfernst
- 7687 Matthias
- 7688 Lothar
- 7689 Reinerstoss
- 7690 Sackler
- 7691 Brady
- 7692 Edhenderson
- 7693 Hoshitakuhai
- 7694 Krasetín
- 7695 Přemysl
- 7696 Liebe
- 7698 Schweitzer
- 7699 Božek
- 7700 Rote Kapelle
- 7701 Zrzavý
- 7703 Jimcooney
- 7704 Dellen
- 7705 Humeln
- 7706 Mien
- 7707 Yes
- 7708 Fennimore
- 7710 Ishibashi
- 7711 Říp
- 7713 Tsutomu
- 7714 Briccialdi
- 7715 Leonidarosino
- 7716 Ube
- 7717 Tabeisshi
- 7718 Desnoux
- 7720 Lepaute
- 7721 Andrillat
- 7722 Firneis
- 7723 Lugger
- 7724 Moroso
- 7725 Selʹvinskij
- 7726 Olegbykov
- 7727 Chepurova
- 7728 Giblin
- 7729 Golovanov
- 7730 Sergerasimov
- 7732 Ralphpass
- 7733 Segarpassi
- 7734 Kaltenegger
- 7735 Scorzelli
- 7736 Nizhnij Novgorod
- 7737 Sirrah
- 7738 Heyman
- 7739 Čech
- 7740 Petit
- 7741 Fedoseev
- 7742 Altamira
- 7747 Michałowski
- 7749 Jackschmitt
- 7750 McEwen
- 7752 Otauchunokai
- 7754 Gopalan
- 7755 Haute-Provence
- 7756 Scientia
- 7757 Kameya
- 7758 Poulanderson
- 7763 Crabeels
- 7766 Jododaira
- 7767 Tomatic
- 7769 Okuni
- 7770 Siljan
- 7771 Tvären
- 7773 Kyokuchiken
- 7775 Taiko
- 7776 Takeishi
- 7777 Consadole
- 7778 Markrobinson
- 7779 Susanring
- 7780 Maren
- 7781 Townsend
- 7782 Mony
- 7784 Watterson
- 7786 Norikazunagata
- 7787 Annalaura
- 7788 Tsukuba
- 7789 Kwiatkowski
- 7790 Miselli
- 7791 Ebicykl
- 7793 Mutlu-Pakdil
- 7794 Sanvito
- 7796 Járacimrman
- 7797 Morita
- 7799 Martinšolc
- 7800 Zhongkeyuan
- 7801 Goretti
- 7802 Takiguchi
- 7803 Adachi
- 7804 Boesgaard
- 7805 Moons
- 7806 Umasslowell
- 7807 Grier
- 7808 Bagould
- 7809 Marcialangton
- 7811 Zhaojiuzhang
- 7812 Billward
- 7813 Anderserikson
- 7815 Dolon
- 7816 Hanoi
- 7817 Zibiturtle
- 7818 Muirhead
- 7820 Ianlyon
- 7824 Lynch
- 7826 Kinugasa
- 7828 Noriyositosi
- 7829 Jaroff
- 7830 Akihikotago
- 7831 François-Xavier
- 7833 Nilstamm
- 7835 Myroncope
- 7837 Mutsumi
- 7838 Feliceierman
- 7840 Hendrika
- 7842 Ishitsuka
- 7844 Horikawa
- 7845 Mckim
- 7846 Setvák
- 7847 Mattiaorsi
- 7848 Bernasconi
- 7849 Janjosefrič
- 7850 Buenos Aires
- 7851 Azumino
- 7852 Itsukushima
- 7853 Confucius
- 7854 Laotse
- 7855 Tagore
- 7856 Viktorbykov
- 7857 Lagerros
- 7858 Bolotov
- 7859 Lhasa
- 7860 Zahnle
- 7861 Messenger
- 7862 Keikonakamura
- 7863 Turnbull
- 7864 Borucki
- 7865 Françoisgros
- 7866 Sicoli
- 7867 Burian
- 7868 Barker
- 7869 Pradun
- 7871 Tunder
- 7873 Böll
- 7881 Schieferdecker
- 7885 Levine
- 7886 Redman
- 7887 Bratfest
- 7890 Yasuofukui
- 7891 Fuchie
- 7892 Musamurahigashi
- 7894 Rogers
- 7895 Kaseda
- 7896 Švejk
- 7897 Bohuška
- 7898 Ohkuma
- 7899 Joya
- 7900 Portule
- 7901 Konnai
- 7902 Hanff
- 7903 Albinoni
- 7904 Morrow
- 7905 Juzoitami
- 7906 Melanchton
- 7907 Erasmus
- 7908 Zwingli
- 7909 Ziffer
- 7910 Aleksola
- 7911 Carlpilcher
- 7912 Lapovok
- 7913 Parfenov
- 7915 Halbrook
- 7916 Gigiproietti
- 7917 Hammergren
- 7918 Berrilli
- 7919 Prime
- 7921 Huebner
- 7922 Violalaurenti
- 7923 Chyba
- 7924 Simbirsk
- 7925 Shelus
- 7927 Jamiegilmour
- 7928 Bijaoui
- 7931 Kristianpedersen
- 7932 Plimpton
- 7933 Magritte
- 7934 Sinatra
- 7935 Beppefenoglio
- 7936 Mikemagee
- 7939 Asphaug
- 7940 Erichmeyer
- 7945 Kreisau
- 7947 Toland
- 7948 Whitaker
- 7950 Berezov
- 7953 Kawaguchi
- 7954 Kitao
- 7955 Ogiwara
- 7956 Yaji
- 7957 Antonella
- 7958 Leakey
- 7959 Alysecherri
- 7960 Condorcet
- 7961 Ercolepoli
- 7963 Falcinelli
- 7965 Katsuhiko
- 7966 Richardbaum
- 7967 Beny
- 7968 Elst–Pizarro
- 7970 Lichtenberg
- 7971 Meckbach
- 7972 Mariotti
- 7973 Koppeschaar
- 7974 Vermeesch
- 7976 Pinigin
- 7978 Niknesterov
- 7979 Pozharskij
- 7980 Senkevich
- 7981 Katieoakman
- 7982 Timmartin
- 7983 Festin
- 7984 Marius
- 7985 Nedelcu
- 7986 Romania
- 7987 Walshkevin
- 7988 Pucacco
- 7989 Pernadavide
- 7991 Kaguyahime
- 7992 Yozan
- 7993 Johnbridges
- 7994 Bethellen
- 7995 Khvorostovsky
- 7996 Vedernikov
- 7998 Gonczi
- 7999 Nesvorný
back to top

== See also ==
- List of minor planet discoverers
- List of observatory codes
- Meanings of minor planet names § Index
