= Spahr =

Spahr is a surname. Notable people with the surname include:

- Charles Barzillai Spahr (1860-1904), American political economist
- Charles E. Spahr (1913–2009)
- Gebhard Spahr (1913–1986), German Benedictine monk, historian, art historian
- Jean Gurney Fine Spahr (1861-1935), American social reformer
- Juliana Spahr (born 1966), American poet, critic, and editor
- Samuel Spahr Laws (1824–1921), American physician, businessman, inventor, professor, college president and minister
- Timothy B. Spahr, American astronomer
  - 171P/Spahr, periodic comet in the Solar System; named after Timothy B. Spahr
  - 242P/Spahr
  - 2975 Spahr, main-belt asteroid; named after Timothy B. Spahr

== See also ==
- Ballard Spahr, American law firm established in 1885
