= List of named minor planets: N =

This is a partial list of named minor planets, containing all those starting with the letter N, as of 9 November 2026. It is ordered in a case-insensitive, alphabetical manner and contains a total of 769 entries. Grey minor planets have no article and redirect to the list of minor planets instead (see List of minor planets § Main index).

== N ==
- 1758 Naantali
- 4552 Nabelek
- 26702 Naber
- 7232 Nabokov
- 11370 Nabrown
- 533671 Nabu
- 20288 Nachbaur
- 28146 Nackard
- 34611 Nacogdoches
- 4106 Nada
- 35353 Naďapravcová
- 2394 Nadeev
- 65784 Naderayama
- 5515 Naderi
- 2071 Nadezhda
- 5089 Nádherná
- 12762 Nadiavittor
- 32616 Nadinehan
- 17210 Nadinemeister
- 557045 Nadolschi
- 1906 Naef
- 21571 Naegeli
- 845 Naëma
- 2935 Naerum
- 20337 Naeve
- 19433 Naftz
- 6655 Nagahama
- 33553 Nagai
- 13787 Nagaishi
- 15763 Nagakubo
- 16587 Nagamori
- 23638 Nagano
- 15350 Naganuma
- 16555 Nagaomasami
- 23495 Nagaotoshiko
- 5790 Nagasaki
- 14850 Nagashimacho
- 24726 Nagatatetsuya
- 18467 Nagatatsu
- 11086 Nagatayuji
- 22409 Nagatohideaki
- 8932 Nagatomo
- 14061 Nagincox
- 10715 Nagler
- 5909 Nagoya
- 115059 Nagykároly
- 558398 Nagysándor
- 256697 Nahapetov
- 28183 Naidu
- 376311 Naidubezawada
- 33118 Naiknaware
- 601894 Naiman
- 333205 Nair
- 4245 Nairc
- 27816 Naitohiroyuki
- 4493 Naitomitsu
- 14105 Nakadai
- 22719 Nakadori
- 190057 Nakagawa
- 52443 Nakagiri
- 9228 Nakahiroshi
- 10894 Nakai
- 110408 Nakajima
- 237276 Nakama
- 27930 Nakamatsu
- 4219 Nakamura
- 14028 Nakamurahiroshi
- 11865 Nakamuramasatsug
- 13605 Nakamuraminoru
- 19314 Nakamuratetsu
- 21036 Nakamurayoshi
- 8702 Nakanishi
- 3431 Nakano
- 73827 Nakanohoshinokai
- 10546 Nakanomakoto
- 10161 Nakanoshima
- 8703 Nakanotadao
- 21234 Nakashima
- 23475 Nakazawa
- 5667 Nakhimovskaya
- 8065 Nakhodkin
- 16938 Nalanimiller
- 31271 Nallino
- 7664 Namahage
- 1327 Namaqua
- 22863 Namarkarian
- 13298 Namatjira
- 3320 Namba
- 147971 Nametoko
- 1718 Namibia
- 7304 Namiki
- 61386 Namikoshi
- 25899 Namratanand
- 248388 Namtso
- 3374 Namur
- 6321 Namuratakao
- 26733 Nanavisitor
- 26441 Nanayakkara
- 4222 Nancita
- 2056 Nancy
- 9378 Nancy-Lorraine
- 20311 Nancycarter
- 6899 Nancychabot
- 6911 Nancygreen
- 4745 Nancymarie
- 55221 Nancynoblitt
- 19809 Nancyowen
- 47862 Nancyramos
- 5052 Nancyruth
- 13739 Nancyworden
- 27915 Nancywright
- 23692 Nandatianwenners
- 187707 Nandaxianlin
- 31576 Nandigala
- 34819 Nandininaidu
- 23228 Nandinisarma
- 5852 Nanette
- 12977 Nanettevigil
- 96296 Nanhangda
- 3607 Naniwa
- 3901 Nanjingdaxue
- 5288 Nankichi
- 2078 Nanking
- 4243 Nankivell
- 530739 Nanligong
- 1203 Nanna
- 6852 Nannibignami
- 295299 Nannidiana
- 559 Nanon
- 530768 Nanpu
- 79694 Nanrendong
- 853 Nansenia
- 216446 Nanshida
- 13765 Nansmith
- 44263 Nansouty
- 8210 NANTEN
- 3051 Nantong
- 160493 Nantou
- 7041 Nantucket
- 406308 Nanwai
- 24063 Nanwoodward
- 236788 Nanxinda
- 9092 Nanyang
- 346150 Nanyi
- 43998 Nanyoshino
- 20107 Nanyotenmondai
- 8220 Nanyou
- 13221 Nao
- 100483 NAOJ
- 14925 Naoko
- 6139 Naomi
- 8463 Naomimurdoch
- 68109 Naomipasachoff
- 26457 Naomishah
- 8212 Naoshigetani
- 6025 Naotosato
- 11615 Naoya
- 7379 Naoyaimae
- 43859 Naoyayano
- 5238 Naozane
- 31700 Naperez
- 7096 Napier
- 1876 Napolitania
- 171588 Náprstek
- 7253 Nara
- 15716 Narahara
- 11907 Näränen
- 3448 Narbut
- 37117 Narcissus
- 26268 Nardi
- 15476 Narendra
- 13957 NARIT
- 21120 Naritaatsushi
- 19165 Nariyuki
- 6167 Narmanskij
- 227326 Narodychi
- 5896 Narrenschiff
- 23289 Naruhirata
- 8189 Naruke
- 9107 Narukospa
- 26828 Narusawa
- 94356 Naruto
- 11365 NASA
- 3619 Nash
- 1534 Näsi
- 32939 Nasimi
- 5680 Nasmyth
- 10052 Nason
- 9240 Nassau
- 534 Nassovia
- 119961 Nastasi
- 5233 Nastes
- 11323 Nasu
- 1086 Nata
- 294814 Nataliakidalova
- 34729 Natalianoel
- 22937 Nataliavella
- 448 Natalie
- 33555 Nataliebush
- 33345 Nataliedessay
- 198700 Nataliegrünewald
- 11710 Nataliehale
- 33248 Nataliehowell
- 343664 Nataliemainzer
- 30067 Natalieng
- 167855 Natalinistéphane
- 1121 Natascha
- 236811 Natascharenate
- 20558 Natashaalmeida
- 31643 Natashachugh
- 10942 Natashamaniar
- 13234 Natashaowen
- 24934 Natecovert
- 330934 Natevanwey
- 12948 Nathaliedegenaar
- 32594 Nathandeng
- 27421 Nathanhan
- 25258 Nathaniel
- 33394 Nathaniellee
- 10275 Nathankaib
- 134019 Nathanmogk
- 24492 Nathanmonroe
- 20078 Nathanrosen
- 33484 Nathanroth
- 28740 Nathansperry
- 47040 Nathbrouillet
- 10210 Nathues
- 28452 Natkondamuri
- 5520 Natori
- 26276 Natrees
- 58152 Natsöderblom
- 71001 Natspasoc
- 29347 Natta
- 31938 Nattapong
- 11788 Nauchnyj
- 3020 Naudts
- 811 Nauheima
- 9712 Nauplius
- 570814 Nauru
- 192 Nausikaa
- 9769 Nautilus
- 3688 Navajo
- 9808 Navamijain
- 4472 Navashin
- 25763 Naveenmurali
- 218998 Navi
- 216893 Navina
- 23315 Navinbrian
- 26707 Navrazhnykh
- 31690 Nayamenezes
- 23217 Nayana
- 31673 Nayessda
- 25231 Naylor
- 30242 Naymark
- 16463 Nayoro
- 369297 Nazca
- 1634 Ndola
- 10061 Ndolaprata
- 5356 Neagari
- 68218 Nealgalt
- 26942 Nealkuhn
- 903 Nealley
- 21421 Nealwadhwa
- 85299 Neander
- 64070 NEAT
- 69264 Nebra
- 10195 Nebraska
- 2936 Nechvíle
- 1223 Neckar
- 819720 Neculairădulescu
- 220346 Nedabehrooz
- 3592 Nedbal
- 7985 Nedelcu
- 3343 Nedzel
- 2790 Needham
- 224831 Neeffisis
- 28161 Neelpatel
- 13860 Neely
- 17214 Neervannan
- 9211 Neese
- 7108 Nefedov
- 3199 Nefertiti
- 9087 Neff
- 31402 Negishi
- 8802 Negley
- 5857 Neglinka
- 14154 Negrelli
- 21577 Negron
- 2462 Nehalennia
- 2355 Nei Monggol
- 121014 Neida
- 31378 Neidinger
- 7102 Neilbone
- 30229 Neilbowles
- 33454 Neilclaffey
- 30024 Neildavey
- 34166 Neildeshmukh
- 16000 Neilgehrels
- 23673 Neilmehta
- 34319 Neilmilburn
- 314650 Neilnorman
- 28222 Neilpathak
- 23469 Neilpeart
- 366487 Neilyoung
- 142014 Neirinck
- 16972 Neish
- 1122 Neith
- 2907 Nekrasov
- 25970 Nelakanti
- 1547 Nele
- 136557 Neleus
- 18396 Nellysachs
- 33468 Nelsoneric
- 3538 Nelsonia
- 30141 Nelvenzon
- 51 Nemausa
- 55543 Nemeghaire
- 128 Nemesis
- 474440 Nemesnagyágnes
- 241090 Nemet
- 563707 Némethgeri
- 4228 Nemiro
- 270558 Nemiroff
- 4861 Nemirovskij
- 1640 Nemo
- 20936 Nemrut Dagi
- 24778 Nemsu
- 151430 Nemunas
- 95020 Nencini
- 289 Nenetta
- 142106 Nengshun
- 261110 Neoma
- 2260 Neoptolemus
- 431 Nephele
- 287 Nephthys
- 17652 Nepoti
- 2869 Nepryadva
- 4660 Nereus
- 126965 Neri
- 1318 Nerina
- 237845 Neris
- 396931 Nerliluca
- 24748 Nernst
- 90936 Neronet
- 601 Nerthus
- 1875 Neruda
- 545561 Nesbø
- 241362 Nesiotites
- 24535 Neslušan
- 12405 Nespoli
- 7066 Nessus
- 17547 Nestebovelli
- 3071 Nesterov
- 659 Nestor
- 7999 Nesvorný
- 410835 Neszmerak
- 137166 Netabahcall
- 8750 Nettarufina
- 20289 Nettimi
- 3175 Netto
- 8634 Neubauer
- 2183 Neufang
- 329018 Neufeld
- 3484 Neugebauer
- 165192 Neugent
- 13980 Neuhauser
- 1129 Neujmina
- 6150 Neukum
- 6351 Neumann
- 9351 Neumayer
- 342000 Neumünster
- 4216 Neunkirchen
- 2898 Neuvo
- 17928 Neuwirth
- 1603 Neva
- 22195 Nevadodelruiz
- 1679 Nevanlinna
- 237277 Nevaruth
- 5405 Neverland
- 18497 Nevězice
- 5612 Nevskij
- 503033 New Hampshire
- 386622 New Zealand
- 163640 Newberg
- 26513 Newberry
- 2955 Newburn
- 855 Newcombia
- 2086 Newell
- 28682 Newhams
- 8161 Newman
- 375005 Newsome
- 200033 Newtaipei
- 662 Newtonia
- 3845 Neyachenko
- 34163 Neyveli
- 2390 Nežárka
- 4361 Nezhdanova
- 20560 Nežič
- 8143 Nezval
- 432101 Ngari
- 28416 Ngqin
- 24052 Nguyen
- 21572 Nguyen-McCarty
- 175238 Nguyenhien
- 20887 Ngwaikin
- 8895 Nha
- 18994 Nhannguyen
- 34646 Niaclements
- 12382 Niagara Falls
- 28837 Nibalachandar
- 5135 Nibutani
- 66583 Nicandra
- 11908 Nicaragua
- 6952 Niccolò
- 326732 Nice
- 25747 Nicerasmus
- 163641 Nichol
- 28442 Nicholashuey
- 133889 Nicholasmills
- 33440 Nicholasprato
- 19425 Nicholasrapp
- 68410 Nichols
- 18202 Nichols-Fleming
- 1831 Nicholson
- 164791 Nicinski
- 21638 Nicjachowski
- 16193 Nickaiser
- 22639 Nickanthony
- 30197 Nickbadyrka
- 14511 Nickel
- 21463 Nickerson
- 199999 Nickgrossman
- 8914 Nickjames
- 31525 Nickmiller
- 26267 Nickmorgan
- 25663 Nickmycroft
- 124368 Nickphoenix
- 6365 Nickschneider
- 25746 Nickscoville
- 13699 Nickthomas
- 4755 Nicky
- 21415 Nicobrenner
- 11856 Nicolabonev
- 843 Nicolaia
- 12928 Nicolapozio
- 170162 Nicolashayek
- 1343 Nicole
- 152336 Nicolecarr
- 30388 Nicolejustice
- 28848 Nicolemarie
- 171624 Nicolemartin
- 28038 Nicoleodzer
- 6335 Nicolerappaport
- 17048 Nicolesegaran
- 31282 Nicoleticea
- 170395 Nicolevogt
- 13729 Nicolewen
- 32563 Nicolezaidi
- 292352 Nicolinha
- 15386 Nicolini
- 14826 Nicollier
- 8128 Nicomachus
- 14567 Nicovincenti
- 833362 Nida
- 3284 Niebuhr
- 113394 Niebur
- 23179 Niedermeyer
- 9517 Niehaisheng
- 12172 Niekdekort
- 1720 Niels
- 8525 Nielsabel
- 9744 Nielsen
- 5289 Niemelä
- 9246 Niemeyer
- 3117 Niépce
- 7014 Nietzsche
- 7541 Nieuwenhuis
- 26681 Niezgay
- 3795 Nigel
- 18158 Nigelreuel
- 8766 Niger
- 227997 NIGLAS
- 513557 NIGPAS
- 8751 Nigricollis
- 20115 Niheihajime
- 18160 Nihon Uchu Forum
- 2880 Nihondaira
- 5082 Nihonsyoki
- 19509 Niigata
- 220736 Niihama
- 5507 Niijima
- 2972 Niilo
- 25302 Niim
- 4959 Niinoama
- 9990 Niiyaeki
- 21710 Nijhawan
- 16730 Nijisseiki
- 38823 Nijland
- 8572 Nijo
- 623827 Nikandrilyich
- 28531 Nikbogdanov
- 10261 Nikdollezhalʹ
- 307 Nike
- 121211 Nikeshadavis
- 24950 Nikhilas
- 34165 Nikhilcheerla
- 33569 Nikhilgopal
- 20646 Nikhilgupta
- 34780 Nikhillohe
- 31575 Nikhilmurthy
- 27452 Nikhilpatel
- 17909 Nikhilshukla
- 665583 Nikiforov
- 14349 Nikitamikhalkov
- 4480 Nikitibotania
- 4605 Nikitin
- 1185 Nikko
- 21655 Niklauswirth
- 7978 Niknesterov
- 4010 Nikolʹskij
- 8141 Nikolaev
- 9329 Nikolaimedtner
- 31698 Nikolaiortiz
- 11782 Nikolajivanov
- 6483 Nikolajvasilʹev
- 22383 Nikolauspacassi
- 14819 Nikolaylaverov
- 673741 Nikolayperov
- 12386 Nikolova
- 2386 Nikonov
- 4434 Nikulin
- 540413 Nikzad
- 191911 Nilerodgers
- 21929 Nileshraval
- 57658 Nilrem
- 7833 Nilstamm
- 17936 Nilus
- 13310 Nilvo
- 129052 Nîmeshdave
- 4864 Nimoy
- 779 Nina
- 301553 Ninaglebova
- 225225 Ninagrünewald
- 21637 Ninahuffman
- 3543 Ningbo
- 85410 Ningda
- 2539 Ningxia
- 18843 Ningzhou
- 4678 Ninian
- 10619 Ninigi
- 357 Ninina
- 2421 Nininger
- 4947 Ninkasi
- 13530 Ninnemann
- 73453 Ninomanfredi
- 4141 Nintanlena
- 71 Niobe
- 727 Nipponia
- 134180 Nirajinamdar
- 19007 Nirajnathan
- 29852 Niralithakor
- 11796 Nirenberg
- 173086 Nireus
- 25021 Nischaykumar
- 18918 Nishashah
- 10500 Nishi-koen
- 10399 Nishiharima
- 11915 Nishiinoue
- 4898 Nishiizumi
- 589558 Nishikawa
- 23955 Nishikota
- 10193 Nishimoto
- 6306 Nishimura
- 8934 Nishimurajun
- 12262 Nishio
- 48200 Nishiokatakashi
- 6745 Nishiyama
- 15250 Nishiyamahiro
- 18453 Nishiyamayukio
- 5328 Nisiyamakoiti
- 28589 Nisley
- 21735 Nissaschmidt
- 2124 Nissen
- 29690 Nistala
- 23405 Nisyros
- 121655 Nitapszcolka
- 6885 Nitardy
- 17162 Nithinkavi
- 27928 Nithintumma
- 9543 Nitra
- 738926 Nitschelm
- 127515 Nitta
- 21326 Nitta-machi
- 5992 Nittler
- 34253 Nitya
- 12513 Niven
- 31976 Niyatidesai
- 6965 Niyodogawa
- 23308 Niyomsatian
- 3770 Nizami
- 7736 Nizhnij Novgorod
- 4213 Njord
- 26282 Noahbrosch
- 33690 Noahcain
- 30276 Noahgolowich
- 31595 Noahpritt
- 10784 Noailles
- 52270 Noamchomsky
- 6032 Nobel
- 8234 Nobeoka
- 8100 Nobeyama
- 30290 Noble
- 77856 Noblitt
- 4807 Noboru
- 4351 Nobuhisa
- 11281 Nobuooshita
- 13034 Nobuowatanabe
- 43792 Nobutakagoto
- 27716 Nobuyuki
- 21166 Nobuyukishouji
- 269762 Nocentini
- 8962 Noctua
- 1298 Nocturna
- 1563 Noël
- 10053 Noeldetilly
- 257336 Noeliasanchez
- 18801 Noelleoas
- 703 Noëmi
- 24931 Noeth
- 7001 Noether
- 1068 Nofretete
- 617080 Nögel
- 5734 Noguchi
- 27920 Noguchiujo
- 34534 Nogueira
- 6539 Nohavica
- 3008 Nojiri
- 9537 Nolan
- 18910 Nolanreis
- 5698 Nolde
- 473 Nolli
- 17270 Nolthenius
- 353232 Nolwenn
- 185448 Nomentum
- 6559 Nomura
- 136824 Nonamikeiko
- 1367 Nongoma
- 2382 Nonie
- 25646 Noniearora
- 4022 Nonna
- 9792 Nonodakesan
- 32185 Noonan
- 19612 Noordung
- 783 Nora
- 13015 Noradokei
- 4049 Noragalʹ
- 22912 Noraxu
- 333195 Norberto
- 12501 Nord
- 1463 Nordenmarkia
- 2464 Nordenskiöld
- 5725 Nördlingen
- 6184 Nordlund
- 42073 Noreen
- 11871 Norge
- 29737 Norihiro
- 7786 Norikazunagata
- 35254 Noriko
- 26092 Norikonoriyuki
- 14939 Norikura
- 7828 Noriyositosi
- 6558 Norizuki
- 555 Norma
- 560388 Normafa
- 16707 Norman
- 33926 Normand
- 1256 Normannia
- 10189 Normanrockwell
- 186835 Normanspinrad
- 17826 Normanwisdom
- 215592 Normarose
- 31840 Normnegus
- 13404 Norris
- 114703 North Dakota
- 3670 Northcott
- 2025 Nortia
- 3869 Norton
- 23198 Norvell
- 7480 Norwan
- 25766 Nosarzewski
- 63389 Noshiro
- 3162 Nostalgia
- 99825 Nosworthy
- 2857 NOT
- 626 Notburga
- 227641 Nothomb
- 132904 Notkin
- 20625 Noto
- 16101 Notskas
- 6458 Nouda
- 18638 Nouet
- 37785 Nougaro
- 11805 Novaković
- 8052 Novalis
- 4697 Novara
- 22450 Nové Hrady
- 194262 Nové Zámky
- 147745 Novemberkelly
- 3799 Novgorod
- 8839 Novichkova
- 61042 Noviello
- 11604 Novigrad
- 3157 Novikov
- 2495 Noviomagum
- 5301 Novobranets
- 2520 Novorossijsk
- 4271 Novosibirsk
- 13487 Novosyadlyj
- 5897 Novotná
- 8445 Novotroitskoe
- 262536 Nowikow
- 20561 Noyelles
- 4956 Noymer
- 18288 Nozdrachev
- 32776 Nriag
- 528489 Ntuef
- 31097 Nucciomula
- 12504 Nuest
- 8801 Nugent
- 600665 Nuitsaintgeorges
- 6195 Nukariya
- 2053 Nuki
- 39679 Nukuhiyama
- 11059 Nulliusinverba
- 34485 Nullmeier
- 15854 Numa
- 10155 Numaguti
- 5121 Numazawa
- 1206 Numerowia
- 1368 Numidia
- 2502 Nummela
- 5313 Nunes
- 176610 Nuñez
- 420612 Nuptel
- 16852 Nuredduna
- 20013 Nureyev
- 1696 Nurmela
- 3825 Nürnberg
- 4459 Nusamaibashi
- 3424 Nušl
- 25768 Nussbaum
- 73686 Nussdorf
- 15811 Nüsslein-Volhard
- 306367 Nut
- 150 Nuwa
- 1356 Nyanza
- 15492 Nyberg
- 8753 Nycticorax
- 2150 Nyctimene
- 28126 Nydegger
- 11377 Nye
- 12672 Nygårdh
- 13952 Nykvist
- 875 Nymphe
- 6625 Nyquist
- 22978 Nyrola
- 44 Nysa
- 6416 Nyukasayama
- 3908 Nyx
back to top

== See also ==
- List of minor planet discoverers
- List of observatory codes
- Meanings of minor planet names § Index
