= 2090 Mizuho =

Stony asteroid

Discovery
- Discovered by: T. Urata
- Discovery site: Yakiimo Stn.
- Discovery date: 12 March 1978

Designations
- Named after: Mizuho Urata (daughter of discoverer)
- Alternative designations: 1978 EA · 1937 RE; 1942 PG · 1951 EH; 1952 HA_{4} · 1953 RT; 1953 TP · 1959 VD; 1964 TE · 1970 WV; 1978 EJ
- Minor planet category: main-belt · (outer)

Orbital characteristics
- Epoch 4 September 2017 (JD 2458000.5)
- Uncertainty parameter 0
- Observation arc: 66.14 yr (24,157 days)
- Aphelion: 3.4819 AU
- Perihelion: 2.6635 AU
- Semi-major axis: 3.0727 AU
- Eccentricity: 0.1332
- Orbital period (sidereal): 5.39 yr (1,967 days)
- Mean anomaly: 337.47°
- Mean motion: 0° 10^{m} 58.8^{s} / day
- Inclination: 11.814°
- Longitude of ascending node: 339.85°
- Argument of perihelion: 341.20°

Physical characteristics
- Dimensions: 17.991±0.141; 18.185±0.117 km 18.92±0.79 km 35.28 km (calculated)
- Synodic rotation period: 5.47±0.01 h
- Geometric albedo: 0.057 (assumed); 0.207±0.019; 0.2154±0.0435; 0.219±0.029
- Spectral type: Tholen = S · S B–V = 0.871; U–B = 0.499
- Absolute magnitude (H): 10.99

2090 Mizuho, provisional designation 1978 EA, is a stony asteroid from the outer region of the asteroid belt, approximately 18 kilometers in diameter.

The asteroid was discovered on 12 March 1978, by Japanese astronomer Takeshi Urata at the JCPM Yakiimo Station in Shimizu, Japan, who named it after his daughter, Mizuho Urata.

== Orbit and classification ==
Mizuho orbits the Sun in the outer main-belt at a distance of 2.7–3.5 AU once every 5 years and 5 months (1,967 days). Its orbit has an eccentricity of 0.13 and an inclination of 12° with respect to the ecliptic.

The asteroid was first identified as 1937 RE at Simeiz Observatory. The first used observation was obtained at Heidelberg Observatory in 1951, extending the Mizuho's observation arc by 27 years prior to its official discovery observation.

== Physical characteristics ==
In the Tholen classification, Mizuho is characterized as a common S-type asteroid.

=== Rotation period ===
In February 2010, a rotational lightcurve for Mizuho was obtained from photometric observations by James W. Brinsfield at the Via Capote Observatory (G69) in California. It gave a rotation period of 5.47 hours with a brightness variation of 0.30 magnitude (U=2+).

=== Diameter and albedo ===
According to the surveys carried out by the Japanese Akari satellite, and NASA's Wide-field Infrared Survey Explorer with its subsequent NEOWISE mission, Mizuho measures between 18.0 and 18.9 kilometers in diameter and its surface has an albedo of between 0.207 and 0.219, which is typical for stony asteroids. The Collaborative Asteroid Lightcurve Link, however assumes a standard albedo for a carbonaceous C-type asteroid of 0.057 and correspondingly calculates a much larger diameter of 35.3 kilometers.

== Naming ==
The discoverer named this minor planet after his daughter, Mizuho Urata. It was the first asteroid in over 50 years to be discovered by a non-professional astronomer, which set off a wave of interest in amateur asteroid discovery, especially in Japan. The official naming citation was published by the Minor Planet Center on 1 September 1978 (M.P.C. 4482).
