= Inoda =

Inoda may refer to:

- 5484 Inoda, a main-belt asteroid
- Shigeru Inoda (伊野田 繁; 1955–2008), Japanese amateur astronomer
