= Gorizia (disambiguation) =

Gorizia is a city in northern Italy.

Gorizia may also refer to:

- Province of Gorizia, the province of the Friuli–Venezia Giulia region
- County of Gorizia, historical province
- Gorizia Statistical Region, a statistical region of Slovenia
- Italian cruiser Gorizia, World War II heavy cruiser
- (7675) Gorizia, a main-belt asteroid
