= 5855 Yukitsuna =

Main-belt asteroid

Discovery
- Discovered by: A. Natori; T. Urata
- Discovery site: JCPM Yakiimo Stn.
- Discovery date: 26 October 1992

Designations
- Named after: Minamoto no Yukitsuna (Japanese general)
- Alternative designations: 1992 UO_{2} · 1943 UF; 1974 FQ_{1} · 1988 VD_{9} 1988 XO_{3}
- Minor planet category: main-belt · (middle); Maria · Eunomia

Orbital characteristics
- Epoch 23 March 2018 (JD 2458200.5)
- Uncertainty parameter 0
- Observation arc: 74.49 yr (27,207 d)
- Aphelion: 2.9480 AU
- Perihelion: 2.1566 AU
- Semi-major axis: 2.5523 AU
- Eccentricity: 0.1551
- Orbital period (sidereal): 4.08 yr (1,489 d)
- Mean anomaly: 124.59°
- Mean motion: 0° 14^{m} 30.12^{s} / day
- Inclination: 15.509°
- Longitude of ascending node: 20.596°
- Argument of perihelion: 323.91°

Physical characteristics
- Mean diameter: 10.585±0.245 km 11.03 km (calculated); 11.100±0.138 km
- Synodic rotation period: 19.04±0.04 h 19.2 h
- Geometric albedo: 0.21 (assumed); 0.273±0.046; 0.3002±0.0416
- Spectral type: S (assumed)
- Absolute magnitude (H): 11.8; 12.1

5855 Yukitsuna, provisional designation 1992 UO_{2}, is a stony Marian asteroid from the central regions of the asteroid belt, approximately 11 kilometers (7 miles) in diameter. It was discovered on 26 October 1992, by Japanese astronomers Akira Natori and Takeshi Urata at the JCPM Yakiimo Station. The likely elongated S-type asteroid has a rotation period of 19 hours. It was named for Minamoto no Yukitsuna, a Japanese general during the Heian era.

== Orbit and classification ==
Yukitsuna is a core member of the Maria family (506), a large intermediate belt family of stony asteroids. Alternatively, it has also been assigned to the stony Eunomia family (502), one of the most prominent families in the intermediate main belt with more than 5,000 members.

It orbits the Sun in the central main-belt at a distance of 2.2–2.9 AU once every 4 years and 1 month (1,489 days; semi-major axis of 2.55 AU). Its orbit has an eccentricity of 0.16 and an inclination of 16° with respect to the ecliptic.

The asteroid was first observed as 1943 UF at Heidelberg Observatory in October 1943. The body's observation arc begins as 1974 FQ_{1} at Crimea–Nauchnij in March 1974, more than 17 years prior to its official discovery observation at Yakiimo.

== Physical characteristics ==
Yukitsuna is an assumed S-type asteroid, as is the overall spectral type of both the Maria and Eunomia family.

=== Rotation period ===
In January 2006, a rotational lightcurve of Yukitsuna was obtained from photometric observations by Federico Manzini at the Sozzago Astronomical Station (A12) in Italy. Lightcurve analysis gave a rotation period of 19.2 hours with a brightness variation of 0.8 magnitude (U=2). In September 2008, a more refined period of 19.04 hours and an amplitude of 0.80 magnitude was measured at the Oakley Southern Sky Observatory and Oakley Observatory (U=2+). The high brightness variation of 0.8 magnitude is indicative for an elongated, non-spherical shape.

=== Diameter and albedo ===
According to the survey carried out by the NEOWISE mission of NASA's Wide-field Infrared Survey Explorer, Yukitsuna measures between 10.585 and 11.100 kilometers in diameter and its surface has an albedo between 0.273 and 0.3002.

The Collaborative Asteroid Lightcurve Link assumes an albedo of 0.21 – derived from 15 Eunomia, the parent body of the Eunomia family – and calculates a diameter of 11.03 kilometers based on an absolute magnitude of 12.1.

== Naming ==
This minor planet was named after Minamoto no Yukitsuna, a general of the late Heian period of Japanese history. The official naming citation was published by the Minor Planet Center on 14 December 1997 (M.P.C. 31024).
