= 6025 Naotosato =

Main-belt asteroid

Discovery
- Discovered by: T. Urata
- Discovery site: Nihondaira Obs.
- Discovery date: 30 December 1992

Designations
- Named after: Naoto Satō (Japanese astronomer)
- Alternative designations: 1992 YA_{3} · 1954 SG_{1} 1965 UO · 1977 BK; 1983 EE_{1} · 1986 TL_{11} 1987 YS_{2} · 1990 HF_{2} 1991 RS_{29}
- Minor planet category: main-belt · Eos

Orbital characteristics
- Epoch 4 September 2017 (JD 2458000.5)
- Uncertainty parameter 0
- Observation arc: 62.68 yr (22,895 days)
- Aphelion: 3.2334 AU
- Perihelion: 2.8116 AU
- Semi-major axis: 3.0225 AU
- Eccentricity: 0.0698
- Orbital period (sidereal): 5.25 yr (1,919 days)
- Mean anomaly: 276.73°
- Mean motion: 0° 11^{m} 15.36^{s} / day
- Inclination: 8.9985°
- Longitude of ascending node: 280.24°
- Argument of perihelion: 160.02°

Physical characteristics
- Dimensions: 17.80 km (calculated); 18.442±0.135; 19.90±0.91 km 19.968±0.172 km
- Synodic rotation period: 10 h
- Geometric albedo: 0.14 (assumed); 0.1475±0.0099; 0.162±0.016; 0.188±0.040
- Spectral type: S
- Absolute magnitude (H): 11.2 · 11.5 · 11.70±0.28

6025 Naotosato, provisional designation 1992 YA_{3}, is an Eoan asteroid from the outer region of the asteroid belt, approximately 19 kilometers in diameter. It was discovered on 30 December 1992, by Japanese astronomer Takeshi Urata at the Nihondaira Observatory in Oohira, Japan. The asteroid was named after Japanese amateur astronomer Naoto Satō.

== Orbit and classification ==
Naotosato is a member of the Eos family (606), the largest asteroid family in the outer main belt, consisting of nearly 10,000 asteroids.

It orbits the Sun at a distance of 2.8–3.2 AU once every 5 years and 3 months (1,919 days). Its orbit has an eccentricity of 0.07 and an inclination of 9° with respect to the ecliptic. The first observation was made at Goethe Link Observatory in 1954, extending the asteroid's observation arc by 38 years prior to its discovery.

== Physical characteristics ==
=== Rotation period ===
In September 2009, a rotational lightcurve of Naotosato was obtained from photometric observations by French astronomer René Roy. The fragmentary lightcurve gave a longer-than average rotation period of 10 hours with a brightness amplitude of 0.20 in magnitude (U=1).

=== Diameter and albedo ===
According to the surveys carried out by the Japanese Akari satellite and the NEOWISE mission of NASA's Wide-field Infrared Survey Explorer, Naotosato measures between 18.4 and 20.0 kilometers in diameter and its surface has an albedo between 0.148 and 0.188, while the Collaborative Asteroid Lightcurve Link assumes an albedo of 0.14 and calculates a diameter of 17.8 kilometers with an absolute magnitude of 11.5.

== Naming ==
This minor planet was named after Japanese amateur astronomer Naoto Satō (born 1953), by profession a junior high school science teacher and a prolific discoverer of minor planets from his private Chichibu Observatory himself. He has also prediscovered C/1989 Y2, a parabolic comet credited to McKenzie–Russell. The official naming citation was published by the Minor Planet Center on 2 February 1999 (M.P.C. 33786).
