= 24827 Maryphil =

Main-belt asteroid

Discovery
- Discovered by: T. B. Spahr
- Discovery site: Catalina Stn.
- Discovery date: 2 September 1995

Designations
- Named after: Mary & Phil Spahr (discoverer's parents)
- Alternative designations: 1995 RA
- Minor planet category: main-belt · (inner); Phocaea

Orbital characteristics
- Epoch 4 September 2017 (JD 2458000.5)
- Uncertainty parameter 0
- Observation arc: 22.09 yr (8,067 days)
- Aphelion: 2.8925 AU
- Perihelion: 1.7982 AU
- Semi-major axis: 2.3453 AU
- Eccentricity: 0.2333
- Orbital period (sidereal): 3.59 yr (1,312 days)
- Mean anomaly: 31.688°
- Mean motion: 0° 16^{m} 27.84^{s} / day
- Inclination: 22.946°
- Longitude of ascending node: 303.03°
- Argument of perihelion: 58.680°

Physical characteristics
- Mean diameter: 5.948±0.403 km 6.72±0.19 km 6.96 km (calculated)
- Synodic rotation period: 11.653±0.005 h (Note: Lightcurve plot of (24827) Maryphil by Brian D. Warner at Palmer Divide Observatory (2006) rotation period 11.653±0.005 hours with a brightness amplitude of 0.44±0.02 mag. Summary figure at the LCDB.)
- Geometric albedo: 0.23 (assumed); 0.236±0.014; 0.315±0.028
- Spectral type: SQ · S (assumed)
- Absolute magnitude (H): 13.00 · 13.10; 13.37±0.32

24827 Maryphil (provisional designation 1995 RA) is a stony Phocaea asteroid from the inner regions of the asteroid belt, approximately 6 kilometers in diameter. It was discovered on 2 September 1995, by American astronomer Timothy Spahr at the Catalina Station near Tucson, Arizona, who named it for his parents, Mary & Phil Spahr.

== Orbit and classification ==
Maryphil is a core member of the Phocaea family (701), a prominent family of stony asteroids with their largest members being 25 Phocaea and 587 Hypsipyle. Unlike this asteroid, many members of the relatively eccentric Phocaea family are Mars-crossing asteroids.

This asteroid orbits the Sun in the inner asteroid belt at a distance of 1.8–2.9 AU once every 3 years and 7 months (1,312 days; semi-major axis of 2.35 AU). Its orbit has an eccentricity of 0.23 and an inclination of 23° with respect to the ecliptic.

The body's observation arc begins at the discovering Catalina Station on 30 August 1992, just three nights prior to its official discovery observation.

== Physical characteristics ==
Pan-STARRS' photometric survey characterized Maryphil as an S-type and Q-type asteroid, while the Collaborative Asteroid Lightcurve Link (CALL) assumes it to be a common S-type, which is also the overall spectral type form members of the Phocaea family.

=== Rotation period ===
In November 2006, a rotational lightcurve of Maryphil was obtained from photometric observations by American astronomer Brian Warner at his Palmer Divide Observatory in Colorado. Lightcurve analysis gave a rotation period of 11.653 hours with a brightness amplitude of 0.44 magnitude (U=3-).

=== Diameter and albedo ===
According to the surveys carried out by the Japanese Akari satellite and the NEOWISE mission of NASA's Wide-field Infrared Survey Explorer, Maryphil measures 5.948 and 6.72 kilometers in diameter and its surface has an albedo of 0.236 and 0.315, respectively. CALL assumes a standard albedo for Phocaea asteroids of 0.23, and calculates a diameter of 6.96 kilometers based on an absolute magnitude of 13.0.

== Naming ==
This minor planet was named by the discoverer Timothy Spahr in honor of his supportive parents, Mary Clark (born 1938) and Phil Spahr (born 1938). The official naming citation was published by the Minor Planet Center on 3 July 2012 (M.P.C. 79910).
