= Minoru Kizawa =

Japanese astronomer

Asteroids discovered: 12
4094 Aoshima	August 26, 1987	MPC^{[1]}
4507 Petercollins	March 19, 1990	MPC^{[2]}
5292 Mackwell	January 12, 1991	MPC^{[2]}
5513 Yukio	November 27, 1988	MPC^{[1]}^{[3]}
(6178) 1986 DA	February 16, 1986	MPC
(6393) 1990 HM1	April 29, 1990	MPC^{[2]}
(6785) 1990 VA7	November 12, 1990	MPC^{[2]}
(7338) 1990 VJ_{3}	November 12, 1990	MPC^{[2]}
(7574) 1989 WO_{1}	November 20, 1989	MPC^{[1]}^{[3]}
(9765) 1991 XZ	December 14, 1991	MPC^{[2]}
(17464) 1990 VX_{1}	November 11, 1990	MPC^{[2]}
(19171) 1991 FS	March 17, 1991	MPC^{[2]}
^{1} with W. Kakei, ^{2} with H. Shiozawa, ^{3} with T. Urata

Minoru Kizawa (鬼沢 稔, Kizawa Minoru; born 1947) is a Japanese astronomer and discoverer of minor planets.

Between 1986 and 1991, he has discovered or co-discovered 16 of asteroids at the Nihondaira Observatory in Shimizu, Japan. He is credited as sole discoverer of (6178) 1986 DA, a 3-kilometer near-Earth object belonging to the group of Amor asteroids. His co-discoverers were the Japanese astronomers Takeshi Urata, Watari Kakei and Hitoshi Shiozawa (see adjunct table).
