= (6178) 1986 DA =

Asteroid

Discovery
- Discovered by: M. Kizawa
- Discovery site: Shizuoka Obs.
- Discovery date: 16 February 1986

Designations
- Minor planet category: Amor · NEO

Orbital characteristics
- Epoch 4 September 2017 (JD 2458000.5)
- Uncertainty parameter 0
- Observation arc: 38.03 yr (13,890 days)
- Aphelion: 4.4648 AU
- Perihelion: 1.1805 AU
- Semi-major axis: 2.8226 AU
- Eccentricity: 0.5818
- Orbital period (sidereal): 4.74 yr (1,732 days)
- Mean anomaly: 233.20°
- Mean motion: 0° 12^{m} 28.08^{s} / day
- Inclination: 4.3056°
- Longitude of ascending node: 64.643°
- Argument of perihelion: 127.36°
- Earth MOID: 0.1922 AU · 74.9 LD
- Jupiter MOID: 0.5212 AU

Physical characteristics
- Mean diameter: 2.3 km (dated); 3.149 km 3.15 km (taken); 3.199±0.207 km
- Synodic rotation period: 3.50 h (Note: Pravec (1999) web: rotation period 3.50 hours with a brightness amplitude of 0.3 mag. H = 15.4. No LCDB quality code assigned. No lightcurve published (note: "N"). Summary figures at Collaborative Asteroid Lightcurve Link (CALL) for (6178) and Pravec, P.; Wolf, M.; Sarounova, L. (1999)); 3.51 h
- Geometric albedo: 0.0778; 0.15; 0.161±0.034
- Spectral type: M B–V = 0.677; U–B = 0.267
- Absolute magnitude (H): 15.1 · 15.40±0.1 (R) · 15.9±0.112 · 16.11

(6178) 1986 DA is a metallic asteroid, classified as a near-Earth object of the Amor group, approximately 3 kilometers in diameter. It was discovered on 16 February 1986, by Japanese astronomer Minoru Kizawa at Shizuoka Observatory, Japan.

1986 DA was the first near Earth asteroid thought to be of metallic composition, with high radar brightness; with that it was predicted to have 100 thousand tons of platinum group metals including gold and suggested as a resource for future space colonists.

== Orbit and classification ==
As an eccentric Amor asteroid has an Earth minimum orbit intersection distance of 0.1922 AU (28,800,000 km) and approaches the orbit of Earth from the outside but does not cross it. It crosses however the orbit of Mars and can be classified as a Mars-crosser and also approaches the orbit of Jupiter within 0.5 AU. The asteroid orbits the Sun at a distance of 1.2–4.5 AU once every 4 years and 9 months (1,732 days). Its orbit has an eccentricity of 0.58 and an inclination of 4° with respect to the ecliptic. The first precovery was taken at Siding Spring Observatory in 1977, extending the asteroid's observation arc by 9 years prior to its discovery.

== Physical characteristics ==
The metallic M-type asteroid is notable for being significantly more radar-reflective than other asteroids. Radar measurements suggest it is composed of nickel and iron and that it was derived from the center of a much larger object that experienced melting and differentiation. The observed radar albedo was 0.58 and the optical albedo was 0.14.

=== Rotation and shape ===
It was most probably formed from a larger body through a catastrophic collision with another object. Radar measurements of this body indicate that the surface is relatively smooth on scales of less than a meter, but it is highly irregular on scales of 10–100 meters. Several lightcurve analysis gave it a concurring rotation period of 3.50 to 3.51 hours with a relatively high brightness amplitude between 0.03 and 0.48 in magnitude, indicating an irregular shape (U=3/3/n.a.).

=== Diameter and albedo ===
According to the survey carried out by NASA's Wide-field Infrared Survey Explorer with its subsequent NEOWISE mission, the asteroid has an albedo of 0.08 and 0.16, and a diameter of 3.1 to 3.2 kilometers, respectively. The Collaborative Asteroid Lightcurve Link selects 3.15 kilometers as best result, while the first estimate from 1994 gave a diameter of 2.3 kilometers.

=== Mining considerations ===
The asteroid achieved its most notable recognition when scientists revealed that it contained over "10,000 tons of gold and 100,000 tons of platinum", or an approximate value at the time of its discovery of "$90 billion for the gold and a cool trillion dollars for the platinum, plus loose change for the asteroid's 10 billion tons of iron and a billion tons of nickel." In 2024 the estimated value of 100,000 tons of platinum was worth approximately 3.4 trillion US dollars. The delta-v for a spacecraft rendezvous with this asteroid from low Earth orbit is 7.1 km/s.

== See also ==
- Psyche (spacecraft), planned mission to heaviest metal asteroid 16 Psyche
