= 7776 Takeishi =

Asteroid

Discovery
- Discovered by: T. Urata
- Discovery site: Nihondaira Obs.
- Discovery date: 20 January 1993

Designations
- Named after: Masanori Takeishi (Japanese astronomer)
- Alternative designations: 1993 BF · 1981 RJ; 1995 UM_{4}
- Minor planet category: main-belt · (inner) background

Orbital characteristics
- Epoch 23 March 2018 (JD 2458200.5)
- Uncertainty parameter 0
- Observation arc: 35.66 yr (13,023 d)
- Aphelion: 2.6137 AU
- Perihelion: 1.9042 AU
- Semi-major axis: 2.2590 AU
- Eccentricity: 0.1571
- Orbital period (sidereal): 3.40 yr (1,240 d)
- Mean anomaly: 258.36°
- Mean motion: 0° 17^{m} 25.08^{s} / day
- Inclination: 9.4908°
- Longitude of ascending node: 309.46°
- Argument of perihelion: 39.968°

Physical characteristics
- Mean diameter: 5.99±1.19 km 6.165±0.135 km 7.46 km (calculated)
- Synodic rotation period: 8.65±0.03 h 8.90 h (Note: Lightcurve plot of (7776) Takeishi, Antelope Hills Observatory (H09), Robert A. Koff (2011). Quality code of 1. Summary figures at the LCDB.)
- Geometric albedo: 0.20 (assumed); 0.29±0.13; 0.353±0.051
- Spectral type: S (assumed)
- Absolute magnitude (H): 12.8; 13.0; 13.18±0.27; 13.34

7776 Takeishi, provisional designation 1993 BF, is a background asteroid from the inner regions of the asteroid belt, approximately 6 kilometers (4 miles) in diameter. It was discovered on 20 January 1993, by Japanese astronomer Takeshi Urata at the Nihondaira Observatory in Japan. The assumed S-type asteroid has a rotation period of 8.9 hours. It was named after Japanese amateur astronomer Masanori Takeishi.

== Orbit and classification ==
Takeishi is a non-family asteroid from the main belt's background population. It orbits the Sun in the inner asteroid belt at a distance of 1.9–2.6 AU once every 3 years and 5 months (1,240 days; semi-major axis of 2.26 AU). Its orbit has an eccentricity of 0.16 and an inclination of 9° with respect to the ecliptic. The body's observation arc begins with first observations as 1981 RJ at Anderson Mesa Station in September 1981, more than 11 years prior to its official discovery observation.

== Physical characteristics ==
Takeishi is an assumed, stony S-type asteroid.

=== Rotation period ===
Two rotational lightcurves of Takeishi have been obtained from photometric observations by French amateur astronomer Pierre Antonini and Laurent Bernasconi, as well as by American William Koff at the Antelope Hills Observatory (H09) in Colorado. The fragmentary lightcurves gave a poorly determined rotation period of 8.65 and 8.90 hours, respectively. Both showed a minuscule brightness amplitude of 0.05 magnitude (U=1/1).

=== Diameter and albedo ===
According to the survey carried out by the NEOWISE mission of NASA's Wide-field Infrared Survey Explorer, Takeishi measures between 5.99 and 6.165 kilometers in diameter and its surface has an albedo between 0.29 and 0.353, while the Collaborative Asteroid Lightcurve Link assumes a standard albedo for a stony asteroid of 0.20, and calculates a diameter of 7.46 kilometers based on an absolute magnitude of 13.0.

== Naming ==
This minor planet was named after Japanese amateur astronomer and discoverer of minor planets, Masanori Takeishi (born 1950). Between 1975 and 1993, he was a chief editor of the Japan Astronomical Circular. The official naming citation was published by the Minor Planet Center on 14 December 1997 (M.P.C. 31027).
