= 6042 Cheshirecat =

Mars-crossing asteroid

Discovery
- Discovered by: A. Natori; T. Urata
- Discovery site: JCPM Yakiimo Stn.
- Discovery date: 23 November 1990

Designations
- Pronunciation: /ˈtʃɛʃərkæt/ · /ˈtʃɛʃɪərkæt/
- Named after: Cheshire Cat (Alice in Wonderland)
- Alternative designations: 1990 WW_{2}
- Minor planet category: Mars-crosser

Orbital characteristics
- Epoch 4 September 2017 (JD 2458000.5)
- Uncertainty parameter 0
- Observation arc: 36.84 yr (13,454 days)
- Aphelion: 4.4295 AU
- Perihelion: 1.6505 AU
- Semi-major axis: 3.0400 AU
- Eccentricity: 0.4571
- Orbital period (sidereal): 5.30 yr (1,936 days)
- Mean anomaly: 34.629°
- Mean motion: 0° 11^{m} 9.24^{s} / day
- Inclination: 15.885°
- Longitude of ascending node: 88.606°
- Argument of perihelion: 286.27°

Physical characteristics
- Dimensions: 14.12±0.20 km 14.64 km (calculated)
- Synodic rotation period: 10.049±0.004 h 10.050±0.002 h
- Geometric albedo: 0.109±0.004; 0.057 (assumed)
- Spectral type: XL · K · C
- Absolute magnitude (H): 12.00 · 12.30 · 12.77±0.62 · 12.9

6042 Cheshirecat (/ˈtʃɛʃərkæt/ or /ˈtʃɛʃɪərkæt/), provisional designation 1990 WW_{2}, is an eccentric, rare-type asteroid and large Mars-crosser from the outer regions of the asteroid belt, approximately 14 kilometers in diameter. It was discovered by Japanese astronomers Akira Natori and Takeshi Urata at the JCPM Yakiimo Station on 23 November 1990. It was named for the Cheshire Cat from the novel Alice's Adventures in Wonderland.

== Classification and orbit ==
Cheshirecat is a Mars-crossing asteroid, as it crosses the orbit of Mars at 1.666 AU. It orbits the Sun at a distance of 1.65–4.43 AU once every 5 years and 4 months (1,936 days). Its orbit has an eccentricity of 0.46 and an inclination of 16° with respect to the ecliptic.

The body's observation arc begins 11 years prior to its official discovery observation, with a precovery taken at the Siding Spring Observatory in August 1979.

== Physical characteristics ==
According to photometry from the Sloan Digital Sky Survey, Cheshirecat is a rare K-type asteroid. The asteroid has also been characterized as a XL-type – which transitions from the X-type to the L-type asteroid – by Pan-STARRS photometric survey.

=== Lightcurves ===
In December 2006, a rotational lightcurve of Cheshirecat was obtained from photometric observations by American astronomer Robert Stephens. Lightcurve analysis gave a rotation period of 10.050 hours with a brightness variation of 0.40 magnitude (U=3-). In September 2011, another lightcurve, obtained at the Oakley Southern Sky Observatory (E09), Australia, gave a concurring period of 10.050 hours and an amplitude of 0.20 (U=3-)

=== Diameter and albedo ===
According to the survey carried out by the Japanese Akari satellite, Cheshirecat measures 14.12 kilometers in diameter and its surface has an albedo of 0.109. The Collaborative Asteroid Lightcurve Link assumes a standard albedo for carbonaceous asteroids of 0.057 and calculates a diameter of 14.64 kilometers based on an absolute magnitude of 12.9.

== Naming ==
This minor planet was named for the Cheshire Cat, a cat appearing in Lewis Carroll's famous fairy tale Alice in Wonderland. The cat is known for its distinctive mischievous grins and eyes that linger after it has already faded away. The asteroid's name and citation was proposed by co-discoverer Takeshi Urata. The approved naming citation was published by the Minor Planet Center on 2 February 1999 (M.P.C. 33786).

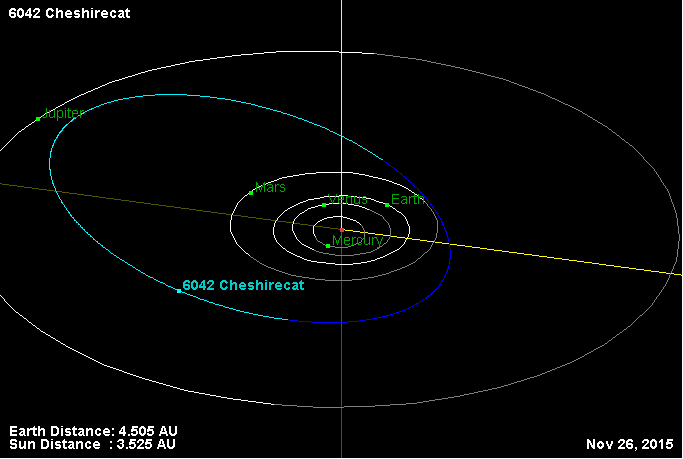
Asteroid orbit
