= 4959 Niinoama =

Main-belt asteroid

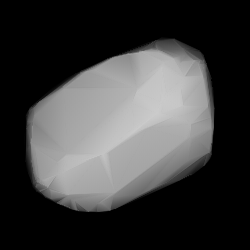
- Shape model of Niinoama from its lightcurve

Discovery
- Discovered by: A. Natori; T. Urata
- Discovery site: JCPM Yakiimo Stn.
- Discovery date: 15 August 1991

Designations
- Named after: Taira no Tokiko (Imperial House of Japan)
- Alternative designations: 1991 PA_{1} · 1958 TZ; 1966 CB · 1968 MC; 1972 EB · 1979 OU_{13} 1980 TG_{1} · 1980 TS_{8} 1984 OO · 1985 OD; 1986 VS_{1} · 1989 FE_{1}
- Minor planet category: main-belt · (outer) background

Orbital characteristics
- Epoch 4 September 2017 (JD 2458000.5)
- Uncertainty parameter 0
- Observation arc: 67.15 yr (24,528 days)
- Aphelion: 3.1759 AU
- Perihelion: 3.1272 AU
- Semi-major axis: 3.1516 AU
- Eccentricity: 0.0077
- Orbital period (sidereal): 5.59 yr (2,044 days)
- Mean anomaly: 129.49°
- Mean motion: 0° 10^{m} 34.32^{s} / day
- Inclination: 8.9913°
- Longitude of ascending node: 128.79°
- Argument of perihelion: 320.53°

Physical characteristics
- Mean diameter: 26.50±0.73 km 27.96±2.4 km 35.842±0.117 km 36.21±0.80 km 42.507±0.576 km
- Synodic rotation period: 4.73±0.01 h
- Geometric albedo: 0.0468±0.0109; 0.066±0.003; 0.079±0.010; 0.1081 (derived); 0.1082±0.021; 0.120±0.014
- Spectral type: C (assumed)
- Absolute magnitude (H): 10.8 · 10.9

4959 Niinoama (prov. designation: 1991 PA_{1}) is a dark background asteroid from the outer regions of the asteroid belt. It was discovered by Japanese astronomers Akira Natori and Takeshi Urata at JCPM Yakiimo Station on 15 August 1991. The presumed carbonaceous C-type asteroid has a rotation period of 4.7 hours and measures approximately 36 kilometers (22 miles) in diameter. It was named after Taira no Tokiko (1126–1185) of the Imperial House of Japan during the Heian period.

== Orbit and classification ==
Niinoama is a non-family asteroid of the main belt's background population when applying the hierarchical clustering method to its proper orbital elements. It orbits the Sun in the outer main-belt at a distance of 3.1–3.2 AU once every 5 years and 7 months (2,044 days). Its orbit has an eccentricity of 0.01 and an inclination of 9° with respect to the ecliptic. A first precovery was taken at Palomar Observatory in May 1950, extending the body's observation arc by more than 41 years prior to its official discovery observation at Yakiimo.

== Naming ==
This minor planet was named after Taira no Tokiko (1126–1185), second wife of military leader Taira no Kiyomori and grandmother of Emperor Antoku after whom 3686 Antoku is named. According to the Tale of the Heike, she drowned herself during the Battle of Dan-no-ura together with the boy-Emperor Antoku in her arms. The official naming citation was published by the Minor Planet Center on 10 November 1992 (M.P.C. 21132).

== Physical characteristics ==
Niinoama is an assumed C-type asteroid.

=== Photometry ===
Photometric observations of Niinoama collected during 2008 show a rotation period of 4.73±0.01 hours with a brightness variation of 0.32 ± 0.04 magnitude (U=3), superseding an early measurement that gave 4.725±0.002 hours (U=1+).

=== Diameter and albedo ===
According to the surveys carried out by the Infrared Astronomical Satellite IRAS, the Japanese Akari satellite, and NASA's Wide-field Infrared Survey Explorer with its subsequent NEOWISE mission, Niinoama measures between 26.50 and 42.51 kilometers in diameter and its surface has an albedo of 0.079. The Collaborative Asteroid Lightcurve Link adopts a diameter of 27.96 kilometers from IRAS, and derives an albedo of 0.1082 based on an absolute magnitude of 10.8.
