= 7526 Ohtsuka =

Asteroid

Discovery
- Discovered by: T. Urata
- Discovery site: Oohira Stn.
- Discovery date: 2 January 1993

Designations
- Named after: Katsuhito Ohtsuka (astronomer, curator)
- Alternative designations: 1993 AA · 1953 XV; 1980 TD_{13} · 1980 VU_{3} 1984 YK_{2}
- Minor planet category: main-belt · (inner)

Orbital characteristics
- Epoch 4 September 2017 (JD 2458000.5)
- Uncertainty parameter 0
- Observation arc: 63.31 yr (23,123 days)
- Aphelion: 3.1213 AU
- Perihelion: 1.8139 AU
- Semi-major axis: 2.4676 AU
- Eccentricity: 0.2649
- Orbital period (sidereal): 3.88 yr (1,416 days)
- Mean anomaly: 194.19°
- Inclination: 4.2151°
- Longitude of ascending node: 232.74°
- Argument of perihelion: 151.48°

Physical characteristics
- Dimensions: 4.71 km (calculated); 6.64±0.65 km 7.654±0.299 km 9.79±0.44 km 11.34±4.59 km
- Synodic rotation period: 7.109±0.001 h
- Geometric albedo: 0.03±0.02; 0.062±0.006; 0.091±0.008; 0.110±0.031; 0.20 (assumed)
- Spectral type: S
- Absolute magnitude (H): 13.70 · 13.8 · 13.90 · 14.0 · 14.16 · 14.93±1.67

7526 Ohtsuka, provisional designation 1993 AA, is a stony asteroid from the inner regions of the asteroid belt, approximately 7 kilometers in diameter. It was discovered by Japanese astronomer Takeshi Urata at Nihondaira Observatory Oohira Station, Japan, on 2 January 1993. The asteroid was named after Japanese astronomer Katsuhito Ohtsuka.

== Orbit and classification ==
Ohtsuka orbits the Sun in the inner main-belt at a distance of 1.8–3.1 AU once every 3 years and 11 months (1,416 days). Its orbit has an eccentricity of 0.26 and an inclination of 4° with respect to the ecliptic. First observed as 1953 XV at Heidelberg, the body's observation arc begins at Palomar in 1980.

== Physical characteristics ==
=== Rotation period ===
In September 2007, a rotational lightcurve of Ohtsuka was obtained from photometric observations by Maurice Clark at the Montgomery College in Rockville, Maryland. Lightcurve analysis gave a rotation period of 7.109±0.001 hours with a brightness amplitude of 0.16 magnitude (U=3-).

=== Diameter and albedo ===
According to the surveys carried out by the Japanese Akari satellite and NASA's Wide-field Infrared Survey Explorer with its subsequent NEOWISE mission, Ohtsuka has an albedo in the range of 0.03 to 0.11 with a diameter between 6.64 and 11.34 kilometers. The Collaborative Asteroid Lightcurve Link, however assumes a standard albedo for stony asteroids of 0.20 and calculates and much smaller diameter of 4.7 kilometers.

== Naming ==
This minor planet was named after Japanese astronomer Katsuhito Ohtsuka (born 1959), also curator of the Tokyo Meteor Network and its meteorite collection. Ohtsuka studies the dynamics of small Solar System bodies, in particular 3200 Phaethon and 96P/Machholz with their complex members. A dynamical relationship between Phaethon and (155140) 2005 UD was discovered by him in 2005. The official naming citation was published by the Minor Planet Center on 12 July 2014 (M.P.C. 89076).
