= Takeshi Urata =

Japanese astronomer

Minor planets discovered: 642
see § List of discovered minor planets

Takeshi Urata (浦田 武, Urata Takeshi; 1947 – December 15, 2012) was a Japanese astronomer. He was a prolific discoverer of asteroids, observing at Nihondaira Observatory.

In 1978 he became the first amateur to discover a minor planet (2090 Mizuho) in over fifty years, which he named after his daughter, Mizuho. His pioneering feat led to an upsurge in such discoveries. In the ten years that followed, amateurs from Japan discovered 160 minor planets. Urata shared his observation data with peer astronomers in Japan on a periodical called "Tenkai" (the Heavens), as well as contributed to academic journals such as Advances in Space Research and participated in poster presentations at astronomical conferences.

Urata co-discovered the periodic comet 112P/Urata-Niijima in 1986. One of the most active amateur astronomers in Japan, he was also an editor of the Japanese Ephemerides of Minor Planets. The 1927-discovered asteroid 3722 Urata is named after him.

== List of discovered minor planets ==
List of minor planets discovered by Takeshi Urata

Name	Discovery Date	Listing
2090 Mizuho	12 March 1978	list
3165 Mikawa	31 August 1984	list^{[A]}
3178 Yoshitsune	21 November 1984	list^{[A]}
3432 Kobuchizawa	7 March 1986	list^{[B]}^{[C]}
3533 Toyota	30 October 1986	list^{[A]}
3565 Ojima	22 December 1986	list^{[D]}
3585 Goshirakawa	28 January 1987	list^{[D]}
3686 Antoku	3 March 1987	list^{[D]}
3733 Yoshitomo	15 January 1985	list^{[A]}
3828 Hoshino	22 November 1986	list^{[A]}
3902 Yoritomo	14 January 1986	list^{[E]}
3950 Yoshida	8 February 1986	list^{[E]}
4035 Thestor	22 November 1986	list^{[A]}
4037 Ikeya	2 March 1987	list^{[A]}
4200 Shizukagozen	28 November 1983	list^{[F]}
4212 Sansyu-Asuke	28 September 1987	list^{[A]}
4374 Tadamori	31 January 1987	list^{[A]}
4375 Kiyomori	28 February 1987	list^{[D]}
4376 Shigemori	20 March 1987	list^{[D]}
4377 Koremori	4 April 1987	list^{[D]}
4402 Tsunemori	25 February 1987	list^{[D]}
4445 Jimstratton	15 October 1985	list^{[A]}
4488 Tokitada	21 October 1987	list^{[A]}
4574 Yoshinaka	20 December 1986	list^{[D]}
4604 Stekarstrom	18 September 1987	list^{[A]}
4748 Tokiwagozen	20 November 1989	list^{[A]}
4767 Sutoku	4 April 1987	list^{[D]}
4806 Miho	22 December 1990	list^{[G]}
4896 Tomoegozen	20 December 1986	list^{[D]}
4941 Yahagi	25 October 1986	list^{[A]}
4945 Ikenozenni	18 September 1987	list^{[A]}
4959 Niinoama	15 August 1991	list^{[G]}
4998 Kabashima	5 November 1986	list^{[A]}
5237 Yoshikawa	26 October 1990	list
5240 Kwasan	7 December 1990	list^{[A]}
5242 Kenreimonin	18 January 1991	list^{[E]}
5482 Korankei	27 February 1990	list^{[A]}
5484 Inoda	7 November 1990	list
5507 Niijima	21 October 1987	list^{[A]}
5513 Yukio	27 November 1988	list^{[H]}^{[J]}
5520 Natori	12 September 1990	list
5526 Kenzo	18 October 1991	list
5565 Ukyounodaibu	10 November 1991	list^{[G]}
5578 Takakura	28 January 1987	list^{[D]}
5591 Koyo	10 November 1990	list
5592 Oshima	14 November 1990	list^{[A]}
5650 Mochihito-o	10 December 1990	list^{[G]}
5683 Bifukumonin	19 October 1990	list
5684 Kogo	21 October 1990	list
(5724) 1986 WE	22 November 1986	list^{[A]}
5744 Yorimasa	14 December 1990	list^{[G]}
5784 Yoron	9 February 1991	list^{[G]}
5830 Simohiro	9 March 1991	list^{[D]}
(5843) 1986 UG	30 October 1986	list^{[A]}
5851 Inagawa	23 February 1991	list^{[E]}
5855 Yukitsuna	26 October 1992	list^{[G]}
5912 Oyatoshiyuki	20 December 1989	list^{[D]}
6025 Naotosato	30 December 1992	list
6042 Cheshirecat	23 November 1990	list^{[G]}
6101 Tomoki	1 March 1993	list
6136 Gryphon	22 December 1990	list^{[G]}
6137 Johnfletcher	25 January 1991	list^{[G]}
6158 Shosanbetsu	12 November 1991	list^{[D]}
6160 Minakata	15 May 1993	list^{[K]}
6197 Taracho	10 January 1992	list^{[E]}
6211 Tsubame	19 February 1991	list^{[E]}
6233 Kimura	8 February 1986	list^{[E]}
6245 Ikufumi	27 September 1990	list
6269 Kawasaki	20 October 1990	list
6270 Kabukuri	18 January 1991	list^{[E]}
6324 Kejonuma	23 February 1991	list^{[E]}
6444 Ryuzin	20 November 1989	list^{[A]}
(6448) 1991 CW	8 February 1991	list^{[A]}
6527 Takashiito	31 October 1992	list^{[G]}
6566 Shafter	25 October 1992	list
6610 Burwitz	28 January 1993	list^{[G]}
6642 Henze	26 October 1990	list
6649 Yokotatakao	5 September 1991	list^{[G]}
6659 Pietsch	24 December 1992	list
6665 Kagawa	14 February 1993	list
6721 Minamiawaji	10 November 1990	list
6725 Engyoji	21 February 1991	list^{[E]}
6730 Ikeda	24 January 1992	list
6735 Madhatter	23 November 1992	list
6736 Marchare	1 March 1993	list
6786 Doudantsutsuji	21 February 1991	list^{[E]}
6827 Wombat	27 September 1990	list
6834 Hunfeld	11 May 1993	list^{[K]}
6838 Okuda	30 October 1995	list^{[K]}
(6967) 1991 VJ3	11 November 1991	list^{[A]}
6984 Lewiscarroll	4 January 1994	list^{[L]}
7016 Conandoyle	30 December 1991	list
7031 Kazumiyoshioka	31 October 1994	list^{[K]}
7032 Hitchcock	3 November 1994	list^{[K]}
7036 Kentarohirata	29 January 1995	list^{[K]}
7037 Davidlean	29 January 1995	list^{[K]}
7038 Tokorozawa	22 February 1995	list^{[M]}
7131 Longtom	23 December 1992	list^{[G]}
(7135) 1993 VO	5 November 1993	list^{[K]}
7136 Yokohasuo	14 November 1993	list^{[L]}
7139 Tsubokawa	14 February 1994	list^{[D]}
7202 Kigoshi	19 February 1995	list^{[D]}
7252 Kakegawa	21 October 1992	list
7259 Gaithersburg	6 March 1994	list^{[K]}
7264 Hirohatanaka	26 March 1995	list^{[K]}
7298 Matudaira-gou	26 November 1992	list^{[A]}
7300 Yoshisada	26 December 1992	list
7301 Matsuitakafumi	2 January 1993	list^{[G]}
7307 Takei	13 April 1994	list^{[K]}
7308 Hattori	31 January 1995	list^{[K]}
7428 Abekuniomi	24 December 1992	list
7470 Jabberwock	2 May 1991	list
7502 Arakida	15 November 1996	list^{[K]}
(7514) 1986 ED	7 March 1986	list^{[B]}^{[C]}
7525 Kiyohira	18 December 1992	list^{[G]}
7526 Ohtsuka	2 January 1993	list
7527 Marples	20 January 1993	list
7533 Seiraiji	25 October 1995	list^{[K]}
(7534) 1995 UA7	26 October 1995	list^{[K]}
7536 Fahrenheit	21 November 1995	list^{[K]}
(7574) 1989 WO_{1}	20 November 1989	list^{[H]}^{[J]}
(7609) 1995 WX3	18 November 1995	list^{[K]}
(7619) 1997 AP21	13 January 1997	list^{[K]}
(7662) 1994 RM1	3 September 1994	list^{[K]}
(7667) 1995 BL3	29 January 1995	list^{[K]}
(7676) 1995 WN8	18 November 1995	list^{[K]}
(7709) 1994 RN1	8 September 1994	list^{[K]}
(7712) 1995 TB1	12 October 1995	list^{[K]}
(7748) 1987 TA	12 October 1987	list^{[D]}
(7764) 1991 AB	7 January 1991	list^{[E]}
7776 Takeishi	20 January 1993	list
(7785) 1994 QW	29 August 1994	list^{[K]}
(7786) 1994 TB15	14 October 1994	list^{[K]}
(7792) 1995 WZ3	18 November 1995	list^{[K]}
(7841) 1994 UE1	31 October 1994	list^{[K]}
(7872) 1990 UC	18 October 1990	list
(7874) 1991 BE	18 January 1991	list^{[E]}
(7893) 1994 XY	2 December 1994	list^{[K]}
(7952) 1992 XB	3 December 1992	list^{[G]}
7955 Ogiwara	18 November 1993	list
(7964) 1995 DD2	23 February 1995	list^{[K]}
(7969) 1997 RP3	5 September 1997	list^{[K]}
8023 Josephwalker	17 February 1991	list
(8038) 1993 JG	11 May 1993	list^{[K]}
(8091) 1992 BG	24 January 1992	list
(8107) 1995 BR4	31 January 1995	list^{[K]}
(8213) 1995 FE	26 March 1995	list^{[K]}
8215 Zanonato	31 March 1995	list^{[K]}
(8226) 1996 TF7	5 October 1996	list^{[K]}
(8312) 1996 TJ12	15 October 1996	list^{[K]}
8344 Babette	25 January 1987	list^{[D]}
(8384) 1992 YB	16 December 1992	list
(8415) 1996 UT	16 October 1996	list^{[K]}
(8427) 1997 TH17	6 October 1997	list^{[K]}
8533 Oohira	20 January 1993	list
(8559) 1995 QM2	25 August 1995	list^{[K]}
8564 Anomalocaris	17 October 1995	list^{[K]}
(8565) 1995 WB_{6}	24 November 1995	list^{[D]}
(8705) 1994 AL_{3}	8 January 1994	list^{[L]}
(8714) 1995 OT	24 July 1995	list^{[K]}
(8715) 1995 OX1	26 July 1995	list^{[K]}
(8718) 1995 UC8	27 October 1995	list^{[K]}
8865 Yakiimo	1 January 1992	list^{[G]}
8889 Mockturtle	31 July 1994	list^{[K]}
(8894) 1995 PV	2 August 1995	list^{[K]}
(8896) 1995 QG2	24 August 1995	list^{[K]}
8903 Paulcruikshank	26 October 1995	list^{[K]}
(9085) 1995 QH2	24 August 1995	list^{[K]}
(9089) 1995 UC7	26 October 1995	list^{[K]}
(9113) 1997 CN5	3 February 1997	list^{[K]}
9178 Momoyo	23 February 1991	list^{[E]}
(9219) 1995 WO8	18 November 1995	list^{[K]}
(9367) 1993 BO3	30 January 1993	list^{[G]}
9387 Tweedledee	2 February 1994	list^{[L]}
(9390) 1994 NJ1	12 July 1994	list^{[K]}
(9401) 1994 TS3	13 October 1994	list^{[K]}
(9410) 1995 BJ_{1}	26 January 1995	list
9418 Mayumi	18 November 1995	list^{[M]}
(9547) 1985 AE	15 January 1985	list^{[A]}
(9635) 1993 XS	9 December 1993	list
(9643) 1994 RX	2 September 1994	list^{[K]}
(9644) 1994 WQ3	26 November 1994	list^{[K]}
(9653) 1996 AL_{2}	13 January 1996	list
9769 Nautilus	24 February 1993	list^{[G]}
9770 Discovery	1 March 1993	list
9777 Enterprise	31 July 1994	list^{[K]}
9780 Bandersnatch	25 September 1994	list^{[K]}
9781 Jubjubbird	31 October 1994	list^{[K]}
9865 Akiraohta	3 October 1991	list^{[A]}
(9867) 1991 VM	3 November 1991	list^{[G]}
9986 Hirokun	12 July 1996	list^{[K]}
(9992) 1997 TG19	8 October 1997	list^{[N]}
10162 Issunboushi	2 January 1995	list^{[D]}
10209 Izanaki	24 August 1997	list^{[K]}
10223 Zashikiwarashi	31 October 1997	list
10227 Izanami	4 November 1997	list^{[N]}
(10229) 1997 WR3	19 November 1997	list^{[K]}
10385 Amaterasu	15 October 1996	list^{[K]}
(10391) 1997 RR3	5 September 1997	list^{[K]}
(10393) 1997 RF_{8}	4 September 1997	list^{[N]}
10412 Tsukuyomi	21 December 1997	list^{[K]}
(10565) 1994 AT_{1}	9 January 1994	list^{[L]}
(10580) 1995 OV	24 July 1995	list^{[K]}
10604 Susanoo	3 November 1996	list
10613 Kushinadahime	4 September 1997	list^{[K]}
(10614) 1997 UH1	21 October 1997	list^{[K]}
10619 Ninigi	27 November 1997	list^{[N]}
10627 Ookuninushi	19 January 1998	list^{[K]}
10725 Sukunabikona	22 November 1986	list^{[A]}
10727 Akitsushima	25 February 1987	list^{[D]}
10768 Sarutahiko	21 October 1990	list
10804 Amenouzume	23 November 1992	list
10831 Takamagahara	15 November 1993	list
(10868) 1996 RF5	3 September 1996	list^{[K]}
(10871) 1996 TG7	5 October 1996	list^{[K]}
10877 Jiangnan Tianchi	16 October 1996	list^{[K]}
(10881) 1996 VA_{5}	4 November 1996	list
(10887) 1996 XU_{25}	12 December 1996	list
10888 Yamatano-orochi	6 December 1996	list^{[K]}
(10896) 1997 UZ14	26 October 1997	list^{[K]}
(10899) 1997 WN_{13}	24 November 1997	list^{[N]}
(10933) 1998 DC24	17 February 1998	list^{[K]}
(10936) 1998 FN11	22 March 1998	list^{[K]}
(10945) 1999 GS9	14 April 1999	list^{[K]}
(11088) 1993 UN	19 October 1993	list^{[K]}
(11097) 1994 UD1	31 October 1994	list^{[K]}
(11106) 1995 UK3	17 October 1995	list^{[K]}
(11113) 1995 WW3	18 November 1995	list^{[K]}
(11114) 1995 WV_{5}	16 November 1995	list^{[M]}
(11153) 1997 YB_{10}	25 December 1997	list^{[N]}
(11157) 1998 AJ	2 January 1998	list^{[K]}
(11327) 1995 SL2	17 September 1995	list^{[K]}
(11330) 1995 WZ6	18 November 1995	list^{[K]}
(11340) 1996 VN_{5}	14 November 1996	list
(11478) 1985 CD	14 February 1985	list^{[A]}
(11522) 1991 JF	3 May 1991	list
(11549) 1992 YY	25 December 1992	list^{[G]}
(11550) 1993 BN	20 January 1993	list
(11551) 1993 BR_{3}	21 January 1993	list
(11599) 1995 QR	16 August 1995	list^{[K]}
(11607) 1995 WX_{1}	16 November 1995	list^{[M]}
(11608) 1995 WU4	18 November 1995	list^{[K]}
(11613) 1995 YN4	23 December 1995	list^{[K]}
(11634) 1996 XU30	12 December 1996	list^{[K]}
(11641) 1997 AP12	7 January 1997	list^{[K]}
(11642) 1997 AN21	13 January 1997	list^{[K]}
(11649) 1997 BR6	29 January 1997	list^{[K]}
(11671) 1998 BG4	21 January 1998	list^{[K]}
(11683) 1998 FO11	22 March 1998	list^{[K]}
(11742) 1999 JZ5	7 May 1999	list^{[K]}
(11744) 1999 NQ_{2}	9 July 1999	list
(11917) 1992 UX	21 October 1992	list
(11918) 1992 UY	21 October 1992	list
(11919) 1992 UD2	25 October 1992	list^{[G]}
(11922) 1992 UT_{3}	27 October 1992	list
(11931) 1993 DD_{2}	22 February 1993	list
(11932) 1993 EP	13 March 1993	list^{[L]}
(11952) 1994 AM_{3}	8 January 1994	list^{[L]}
(11954) 1994 BY	22 January 1994	list^{[L]}
(11961) 1994 PO	3 August 1994	list^{[K]}
(11982) 1995 UF6	25 October 1995	list^{[K]}
(12041) 1997 EQ_{25}	5 March 1997	list
(12336) 1992 WO_{3}	23 November 1992	list
(12425) 1995 VG2	12 November 1995	list^{[K]}
12432 Usuda	12 January 1996	list^{[M]}
(12570) 1998 WV5	18 November 1998	list^{[K]}
(12707) 1990 UK	20 October 1990	list
(12748) 1993 BP3	30 January 1993	list^{[G]}
(12831) 1997 BS6	29 January 1997	list^{[K]}
(12849) 1997 QD2	27 August 1997	list^{[K]}
(12921) 1998 WZ5	20 November 1998	list^{[K]}
(13139) 1994 VD2	3 November 1994	list^{[K]}
(13148) 1995 EF	1 March 1995	list^{[D]}
(13228) 1997 SJ25	29 September 1997	list^{[K]}
(13230) 1997 VG_{1}	1 November 1997	list
(13371) 1998 VH5	8 November 1998	list^{[K]}
(13621) 1995 GC7	1 April 1995	list^{[K]}
(13636) 1995 YS_{2}	22 December 1995	list
(13685) 1997 QG4	27 August 1997	list^{[K]}
(13955) 1990 UA_{2}	21 October 1990	list
(13974) 1991 YC	28 December 1991	list^{[G]}
(13990) 1993 EK	2 March 1993	list
(14011) 1993 US	22 October 1993	list
(14017) 1994 NS	4 July 1994	list^{[K]}
(14029) 1994 UC1	31 October 1994	list^{[K]}
(14099) 1997 RQ3	5 September 1997	list^{[K]}
(14102) 1997 SG25	29 September 1997	list^{[K]}
(14170) 1998 VF6	11 November 1998	list^{[K]}
(14171) 1998 VO6	11 November 1998	list^{[K]}
(14357) 1987 UR	22 October 1987	list^{[A]}
(14477) 1994 CN	2 February 1994	list^{[L]}
(14489) 1994 UW	31 October 1994	list^{[K]}
(14493) 1994 WP3	26 November 1994	list^{[K]}
(14534) 1997 QE2	27 August 1997	list^{[K]}
(14545) 1997 SK25	29 September 1997	list^{[K]}
(14547) 1997 TF_{19}	8 October 1997	list^{[N]}
14664 Vandervelden	25 January 1999	list
(14665) 1999 CC_{5}	12 February 1999	list
(14924) 1994 VZ	3 November 1994	list^{[K]}
(14936) 1995 BU2	27 January 1995	list^{[K]}
(14982) 1997 TH_{19}	8 October 1997	list^{[N]}
(14985) 1997 UU_{2}	25 October 1997	list
(14992) 1997 UY14	26 October 1997	list^{[K]}
(14993) 1997 UC15	26 October 1997	list^{[K]}
(15070) 1999 BK8	20 January 1999	list^{[K]}
(15271) 1991 DE	19 February 1991	list
(15357) 1995 FM	26 March 1995	list^{[K]}
(15401) 1997 VE_{4}	4 November 1997	list^{[N]}
(15405) 1997 WJ7	19 November 1997	list^{[K]}
(15496) 1999 DQ3	20 February 1999	list^{[K]}
(15738) 1991 DP	21 February 1991	list^{[E]}
(15749) 1991 VT_{1}	5 November 1991	list^{[G]}
(15831) 1995 BG3	29 January 1995	list^{[K]}
(15844) 1995 UQ5	20 October 1995	list^{[K]}
(15873) 1996 TH7	5 October 1996	list^{[K]}
(15879) 1996 XH6	3 December 1996	list^{[K]}
(15926) 1997 VP6	5 November 1997	list^{[K]}
(15932) 1997 XL5	2 December 1997	list^{[K]}
(15981) 1998 UP6	18 October 1998	list^{[K]}
(16408) 1986 AB	11 January 1986	list^{[A]}
(16716) 1995 UX_{6}	21 October 1995	list^{[M]}
(16722) 1995 WG7	24 November 1995	list^{[K]}
16723 Fumiofuke	27 November 1995	list^{[M]}
(16746) 1996 PW_{6}	8 August 1996	list^{[L]}
(16751) 1996 QG1	18 August 1996	list^{[K]}
(16752) 1996 QP1	22 August 1996	list^{[K]}
(16767) 1996 US	16 October 1996	list^{[K]}

Name	Discovery Date	Listing
(16773) 1996 VO1	6 November 1996	list^{[K]}
(16774) 1996 VP1	6 November 1996	list^{[K]}
(16786) 1997 AT1	2 January 1997	list^{[K]}
(16789) 1997 AU_{3}	3 January 1997	list
(16821) 1997 VZ4	5 November 1997	list^{[K]}
(16822) 1997 VA5	5 November 1997	list^{[K]}
(16830) 1997 WQ7	19 November 1997	list^{[K]}
(16863) 1997 YJ16	31 December 1997	list^{[K]}
(16875) 1998 BD4	20 January 1998	list^{[K]}
(16885) 1998 BX25	25 January 1998	list^{[K]}
(17406) 1987 DO	25 February 1987	list^{[D]}
17472 Dinah	17 March 1991	list^{[D]}
17518 Redqueen	18 December 1992	list^{[G]}
17612 Whiteknight	20 October 1995	list^{[M]}
17627 Humptydumpty	27 January 1996	list
(17648) 1996 UU	16 October 1996	list^{[K]}
17670 Liddell	8 December 1996	list
17681 Tweedledum	6 January 1997	list
17712 Fatherwilliam	19 November 1997	list^{[K]}
(17719) 1997 XV1	2 December 1997	list^{[K]}
17746 Haigha	30 January 1998	list^{[N]}
17759 Hatta	17 February 1998	list^{[K]}
17768 Tigerlily	3 March 1998	list
(17918) 1999 GE6	14 April 1999	list^{[K]}
17942 Whiterabbit	11 May 1999	list^{[K]}
(18402) 1992 YU_{2}	26 December 1992	list
18469 Hakodate	20 October 1995	list^{[M]}
(18474) 1995 WV3	18 November 1995	list^{[K]}
(18488) 1996 AY_{3}	13 January 1996	list^{[M]}
(18533) 1996 XJ6	3 December 1996	list^{[K]}
(18538) 1996 XY18	6 December 1996	list^{[K]}
(18552) 1997 AM21	13 January 1997	list^{[K]}
(18558) 1997 CO_{19}	6 February 1997	list
(18569) 1997 UC_{11}	26 October 1997	list
(18594) 1998 BJ	16 January 1998	list^{[K]}
(18651) 1998 FP11	22 March 1998	list^{[K]}
(19238) 1994 AV_{1}	9 January 1994	list^{[L]}
(19312) 1996 VR7	15 November 1996	list^{[K]}
(19371) 1997 YP_{11}	27 December 1997	list^{[N]}
(19377) 1998 BE4	21 January 1998	list^{[K]}
(20041) 1992 YH	18 December 1992	list^{[G]}
(20104) 1995 OU	24 July 1995	list^{[K]}
(20122) 1995 WH17	28 November 1995	list^{[K]}
(20125) 1995 YK	17 December 1995	list
(20318) 1998 GZ	3 April 1998	list
(20674) 1999 VT_{1}	4 November 1999	list
(20999) 1987 BF	28 January 1987	list^{[D]}
(21051) 1990 UM	20 October 1990	list
(21053) 1990 VE	10 November 1990	list^{[G]}
(21060) 1991 JC	2 May 1991	list
(21061) 1991 JD	3 May 1991	list
(21122) 1992 YK	23 December 1992	list^{[G]}
(21227) 1995 QS	16 August 1995	list^{[K]}
(21251) 1995 YX_{3}	31 December 1995	list
(21288) 1996 VW	3 November 1996	list
(21592) 1998 VJ5	8 November 1998	list^{[K]}
(21596) 1998 WG_{7}	23 November 1998	list
(21896) 1999 VM_{6}	7 November 1999	list
(22018) 1999 XK105	8 December 1999	list^{[K]}
(22357) 1992 YJ	22 December 1992	list^{[G]}
(22393) 1994 QV	29 August 1994	list^{[K]}
(22407) 1995 SK2	17 September 1995	list^{[K]}
(22444) 1996 TK12	15 October 1996	list^{[K]}
(22504) 1997 TD17	6 October 1997	list^{[K]}
(22522) 1998 EF6	2 March 1998	list^{[K]}
(23095) 1999 XP_{144}	15 December 1999	list
(23476) 1990 VE_{4}	15 November 1990	list^{[D]}
(23586) 1995 TA_{1}	13 October 1995	list^{[M]}
(23594) 1995 VJ2	13 November 1995	list^{[K]}
(23611) 1996 BO_{3}	27 January 1996	list
(23642) 1997 AD_{15}	9 January 1997	list
(23654) 1997 CC_{26}	13 February 1997	list
(23664) 1997 EP_{25}	5 March 1997	list
(23703) 1997 RJ_{1}	3 September 1997	list
(23711) 1997 UT_{2}	25 October 1997	list
(24169) 1999 WQ_{11}	29 November 1999	list
(24185) 1999 XM14	3 December 1999	list^{[K]}
(24793) 1993 UT	22 October 1993	list
(24855) 1995 YM4	22 December 1995	list^{[K]}
(24895) 1997 AC13	9 January 1997	list^{[K]}
(24963) 1997 UB_{11}	26 October 1997	list
(25260) 1998 VN5	8 November 1998	list^{[K]}
(25400) 1999 VU20	9 November 1999	list^{[K]}
(26129) 1993 DK	19 February 1993	list
(26153) 1994 UY	31 October 1994	list^{[K]}
(26218) 1997 WJ13	24 November 1997	list^{[K]}
(26361) 1999 AJ5	10 January 1999	list^{[K]}
(26830) 1990 BB	17 January 1990	list^{[A]}
(26872) 1993 YR	18 December 1993	list^{[K]}
(26890) 1995 BC4	27 January 1995	list^{[K]}
(26902) 1995 YR	17 December 1995	list^{[M]}
(26967) 1997 RZ_{7}	4 September 1997	list^{[N]}
(26974) 1997 TJ_{19}	8 October 1997	list^{[N]}
(26989) 1997 WO7	19 November 1997	list^{[K]}
(26994) 1997 XU1	2 December 1997	list^{[K]}
(26995) 1997 XS11	5 December 1997	list^{[K]}
(27223) 1999 GC5	7 April 1999	list^{[K]}
(27831) 1994 DF	18 February 1994	list
(27847) 1994 UT	31 October 1994	list^{[K]}
(27848) 1994 UZ	31 October 1994	list^{[K]}
(27954) 1997 QB4	27 August 1997	list^{[K]}
(27965) 1997 SH25	29 September 1997	list^{[K]}
(28006) 1997 XM_{5}	3 December 1997	list^{[N]}
(28008) 1997 XR11	5 December 1997	list^{[K]}
(28024) 1998 BT14	25 January 1998	list^{[K]}
(28032) 1998 DZ23	17 February 1998	list^{[K]}
(28181) 1998 WW5	19 November 1998	list^{[K]}
(28230) 1999 AH5	10 January 1999	list^{[K]}
(28231) 1999 AL5	10 January 1999	list^{[K]}
(28362) 1999 GP5	7 April 1999	list^{[K]}
(28405) 1999 TG_{13}	10 October 1999	list
(29192) 1990 VK_{2}	11 November 1990	list
(29312) 1994 BL_{4}	21 January 1994	list^{[L]}
(29343) 1995 CK10	1 February 1995	list^{[K]}
(29468) 1997 UC	20 October 1997	list
(29469) 1997 UV_{2}	25 October 1997	list
(29479) 1997 VJ_{1}	1 November 1997	list
(29494) 1997 WL7	19 November 1997	list^{[K]}
(29496) 1997 WE8	19 November 1997	list^{[K]}
(29564) 1998 ED6	2 March 1998	list^{[K]}
(29636) 1998 VH6	11 November 1998	list^{[K]}
(29754) 1999 CE_{5}	12 February 1999	list
(29821) 1999 DP1	17 February 1999	list^{[K]}
(29823) 1999 DS3	20 February 1999	list^{[K]}
(29871) 1999 GE5	7 April 1999	list^{[K]}
(30885) 1992 UU4	30 October 1992	list^{[G]}
(30965) 1994 XW	2 December 1994	list^{[K]}
(30996) 1995 UH_{4}	20 October 1995	list
(31111) 1997 PN5	11 August 1997	list^{[K]}
(31119) 1997 RP_{1}	3 September 1997	list^{[N]}
(31176) 1997 XL9	2 December 1997	list^{[K]}
(31193) 1997 YP16	31 December 1997	list^{[K]}
(31222) 1998 BD_{30}	26 January 1998	list^{[N]}
(31260) 1998 EE6	2 March 1998	list^{[K]}
(31365) 1998 WF_{7}	23 November 1998	list
(31542) 1999 DR3	20 February 1999	list^{[K]}
(31610) 1999 GC6	14 April 1999	list^{[K]}
(32775) 1986 WP2	29 November 1986	list^{[A]}
(32976) 1996 VK	3 November 1996	list
(33030) 1997 QB2	27 August 1997	list^{[K]}
(33041) 1997 TG17	6 October 1997	list^{[K]}
(33045) 1997 UF1	21 October 1997	list^{[K]}
(33046) 1997 UF2	21 October 1997	list^{[K]}
(33055) 1997 UB15	26 October 1997	list^{[K]}
(33106) 1997 YG_{16}	31 December 1997	list
(33107) 1997 YL16	31 December 1997	list^{[K]}
(33540) 1999 JH3	7 May 1999	list^{[K]}
(33541) 1999 JF6	11 May 1999	list^{[K]}
(34438) 2000 SV44	26 September 2000	list^{[K]}
(35301) 1996 XE	1 December 1996	list
(35323) 1997 CD_{26}	13 February 1997	list
(35393) 1997 XJ5	2 December 1997	list^{[K]}
(35395) 1997 XM_{10}	4 December 1997	list^{[N]}
(35428) 1998 BS2	19 January 1998	list^{[K]}
(35572) 1998 HW6	19 April 1998	list^{[K]}
(35681) 1999 BC2	16 January 1999	list^{[K]}
(35771) 1999 JE6	11 May 1999	list^{[K]}
(37794) 1997 WP7	19 November 1997	list^{[K]}
(37796) 1997 WK13	24 November 1997	list^{[K]}
(37816) 1998 BT2	19 January 1998	list^{[K]}
(37817) 1998 BV2	19 January 1998	list^{[K]}
(37824) 1998 BU14	25 January 1998	list^{[K]}
(39637) 1995 EG	1 March 1995	list^{[D]}
(39664) 1995 WW_{4}	20 November 1995	list^{[D]}
(39667) 1995 YU_{2}	22 December 1995	list
(39688) 1996 RG_{5}	3 September 1996	list^{[L]}
(39721) 1996 VU7	15 November 1996	list^{[K]}
(39729) 1996 XD	1 December 1996	list
(39826) 1998 BY2	19 January 1998	list^{[K]}
(39828) 1998 BH4	21 January 1998	list^{[K]}
(39866) 1998 DB24	17 February 1998	list^{[K]}
(39879) 1998 EK8	3 March 1998	list^{[K]}
(40237) 1998 VM6	11 November 1998	list^{[K]}
(40407) 1999 QT_{2}	31 August 1999	list
(41040) 1999 VR	2 November 1999	list
(42532) 1995 OR	24 July 1995	list^{[K]}
(42561) 1996 XK6	3 December 1996	list^{[K]}
(43018) 1999 VY2	4 November 1999	list^{[K]}
(43021) 1999 VT5	4 November 1999	list^{[K]}
(43147) 1999 XO_{105}	8 December 1999	list^{[L]}
(43795) 1991 AK_{1}	15 January 1991	list^{[E]}
(43900) 1995 VH2	13 November 1995	list^{[K]}
(43904) 1995 WO	16 November 1995	list
(43909) 1995 WB9	28 November 1995	list^{[K]}
(43919) 1996 BG_{3}	18 January 1996	list^{[M]}
(43946) 1997 AR_{6}	7 January 1997	list
(43959) 1997 CB26	12 February 1997	list^{[K]}
(44006) 1997 TF17	6 October 1997	list^{[K]}
(44029) 1998 BK4	21 January 1998	list^{[K]}
(44354) 1998 SS2	16 September 1998	list^{[K]}
(44850) 1999 UR_{1}	17 October 1999	list
(44888) 1999 VJ5	4 November 1999	list^{[K]}
(45144) 1999 XA104	7 December 1999	list^{[K]}
(45145) 1999 XN105	8 December 1999	list^{[L]}
(45179) 1999 XQ_{144}	15 December 1999	list
(46555) 1990 VH_{3}	11 November 1990	list
(46647) 1995 QP3	28 August 1995	list^{[K]}
(46654) 1995 UB8	26 October 1995	list^{[K]}
(46735) 1997 UG1	21 October 1997	list^{[K]}
(46738) 1997 VF_{1}	1 November 1997	list
(47019) 1998 VM5	8 November 1998	list^{[K]}
(47413) 1999 XR_{144}	15 December 1999	list
(48809) 1997 VX4	4 November 1997	list^{[K]}
(49461) 1999 AK5	10 January 1999	list^{[K]}
(49623) 1999 GB5	7 April 1999	list^{[K]}
(49766) 1999 WS	18 November 1999	list
(51341) 2000 QP26	23 August 2000	list^{[K]}
(52427) 1994 PH	2 August 1994	list^{[K]}
(52458) 1995 BK_{1}	26 January 1995	list
(52469) 1995 QV1	20 August 1995	list^{[K]}
(52479) 1995 TZ	13 October 1995	list^{[M]}
(52592) 1997 QC2	27 August 1997	list^{[K]}
(52593) 1997 QF2	27 August 1997	list^{[K]}
(52617) 1997 VH_{1}	1 November 1997	list
(52621) 1997 VW4	4 November 1997	list^{[K]}
(53028) 1998 WX5	20 November 1998	list^{[K]}
(53031) 1998 WE_{7}	23 November 1998	list
(53149) 1999 BZ_{14}	22 January 1999	list
(53153) 1999 BZ_{25}	25 January 1999	list
(53289) 1999 GD5	7 April 1999	list^{[K]}
(53447) 1999 XL105	8 December 1999	list^{[K]}
(55871) 1997 UE1	21 October 1997	list^{[K]}
(55877) 1997 VZ6	4 November 1997	list^{[K]}
(56086) 1999 AA21	13 January 1999	list^{[K]}
(56112) 1999 CK_{5}	12 February 1999	list
(56162) 1999 DX_{2}	20 February 1999	list
(56284) 1999 LA2	5 June 1999	list^{[K]}
(58147) 1986 WK	29 November 1986	list^{[D]}
(58355) 1995 FN	26 March 1995	list^{[K]}
(58410) 1995 YS	17 December 1995	list^{[M]}
(58589) 1997 SF25	29 September 1997	list^{[K]}
(58676) 1997 YN16	31 December 1997	list^{[K]}
(58688) 1998 BJ4	21 January 1998	list^{[K]}
(59070) 1998 VG6	11 November 1998	list^{[K]}
(59243) 1999 CZ_{4}	12 February 1999	list
(59361) 1999 DW_{2}	20 February 1999	list
(61469) 2000 QJ35	23 August 2000	list^{[K]}
(65782) 1995 UG	16 October 1995	list^{[K]}
(65822) 1996 VO_{5}	14 November 1996	list
(65874) 1997 WL13	24 November 1997	list^{[K]}
(66268) 1999 JJ3	7 May 1999	list^{[K]}
(66940) 1999 WM_{11}	29 November 1999	list^{[L]}
(66941) 1999 WO_{11}	29 November 1999	list^{[L]}
(67161) 2000 AA205	8 January 2000	list^{[K]}
(69411) 1995 UR_{8}	21 October 1995	list^{[M]}
(69470) 1996 XH	1 December 1996	list
(69488) 1997 AV_{3}	3 January 1997	list
(69505) 1997 CX_{21}	11 February 1997	list
(69590) 1998 EL8	3 March 1998	list^{[K]}
(69951) 1998 VK6	11 November 1998	list^{[K]}
(71004) 1999 XF38	3 December 1999	list^{[K]}
(71103) 1999 XN_{144}	11 December 1999	list
(73892) 1997 ER_{25}	5 March 1997	list
(73956) 1997 VQ6	5 November 1997	list^{[K]}
(75011) 1999 UQ_{1}	17 October 1999	list
(75055) 1999 VX2	4 November 1999	list^{[K]}
(75237) 1999 WK_{8}	29 November 1999	list
(75241) 1999 WL_{11}	29 November 1999	list^{[L]}
(75242) 1999 WP_{11}	29 November 1999	list^{[L]}
(75309) 1999 XE38	3 December 1999	list^{[K]}
(79791) 1998 VK5	8 November 1998	list^{[K]}
(79794) 1998 VN6	11 November 1998	list^{[K]}
(80183) 1999 VT20	9 November 1999	list^{[K]}
(80242) 1999 WT	18 November 1999	list
(80339) 1999 XB104	7 December 1999	list^{[K]}
(85180) 1990 UW_{5}	26 October 1990	list
(85329) 1995 PQ	2 August 1995	list^{[K]}
(85513) 1997 UE_{11}	31 October 1997	list
(85517) 1997 VL_{1}	1 November 1997	list
(85532) 1997 WD21	23 November 1997	list^{[K]}
(85980) 1999 HG_{3}	20 April 1999	list
(90877) 1996 VQ_{5}	14 November 1996	list
(90881) 1996 XN6	3 December 1996	list^{[K]}
(90949) 1997 VB5	6 November 1997	list^{[K]}
(90995) 1998 AK	2 January 1998	list^{[K]}
(91218) 1999 AM5	10 January 1999	list^{[K]}
(92160) 1999 XO_{144}	15 December 1999	list
(96253) 1995 BY_{1}	28 January 1995	list
(96350) 1997 UA15	26 October 1997	list^{[K]}
(96449) 1998 GA_{1}	3 April 1998	list
(96877) 1999 TF_{13}	10 October 1999	list
(97032) 1999 UL_{3}	20 October 1999	list
(97065) 1999 VV20	9 November 1999	list^{[K]}
(100389) 1995 WU_{8}	24 November 1995	list^{[M]}
(100480) 1996 UK	16 October 1996	list^{[K]}
(100542) 1997 ES_{25}	9 March 1997	list
(100612) 1997 SL25	29 September 1997	list^{[K]}
(100626) 1997 UE2	21 October 1997	list^{[K]}
(100642) 1997 VV4	4 November 1997	list^{[K]}
(100674) 1997 XX1	2 December 1997	list^{[K]}
(101409) 1998 VQ6	11 November 1998	list^{[K]}
(101496) 1998 XM3	9 December 1998	list^{[K]}
(101616) 1999 CL_{9}	12 February 1999	list
(101617) 1999 CM_{9}	13 February 1999	list
(102620) 1999 VX23	9 November 1999	list^{[K]}
(120576) 1995 QK2	25 August 1995	list^{[K]}
(120671) 1996 XT_{25}	12 December 1996	list
(129609) 1997 YO16	31 December 1997	list^{[K]}
(134676) 1999 WN_{11}	29 November 1999	list^{[L]}
136743 Echigo	16 November 1995	list^{[M]}
(136847) 1998 BC4	20 January 1998	list^{[K]}
(137046) 1998 VE6	11 November 1998	list^{[K]}
(137630) 1999 WV	18 November 1999	list
(162034) 1995 XT_{1}	15 December 1995	list
(164670) 1996 XM6	3 December 1996	list^{[K]}
(164771) 1999 CB_{5}	12 February 1999	list
(168394) 1998 BX2	19 January 1998	list^{[K]}
(171521) 1999 CH3	7 February 1999	list^{[K]}
(190315) 1997 VY4	5 November 1997	list^{[K]}
(192887) 1999 XZ103	3 December 1999	list^{[K]}
(219132) 1998 VP6	11 November 1998	list^{[K]}
(231717) 1999 CK_{9}	12 February 1999	list
(337046) 1996 TM_{12}	15 October 1996	list
(390526) 1996 XW_{25}	12 December 1996	list
(480822) 1998 YM_{4}	19 December 1998	list
Co-discovery made with:^{A} K. Suzuki^{B} M. Inoue^{C} O. Muramatsu^{D} T. Niijima^{E} S. Inoda^{F} Y. Banno^{G} A. Natori^{H} W. Kakei^{J} M. Kizawa^{K} Y. Shimizu^{L} H. Shiozawa^{M} N. Satō^{N} T. Kagawa
