= Shigeru Inoda =

Japanese ophthalmologist, amateur astronomer

Minor planets discovered: 17
3394 Banno	February 16, 1986	MPC
3902 Yoritomo	January 14, 1986	MPC
3950 Yoshida	February 8, 1986	MPC
5242 Kenreimonin	January 18, 1991	MPC
5851 Inagawa	February 23, 1991	MPC
6197 Taracho	January 10, 1992	MPC
6211 Tsubame	February 19, 1991	MPC
6233 Kimura	February 8, 1986	MPC
6270 Kabukuri	January 18, 1991	MPC
6324 Kejonuma	February 23, 1991	MPC
6725 Engyoji	February 21, 1991	MPC
6786 Doudantsutsuji	February 21, 1991	MPC
(7764) 1991 AB	January 7, 1991	MPC
(7874) 1991 BE	January 18, 1991	MPC
9178 Momoyo	February 23, 1991	MPC
(15738) 1991 DP	February 21, 1991	MPC
(43795) 1991 AK_{1}	January 15, 1991	MPC

Shigeru Inoda (伊野田 繁, Inoda Shigeru; 1955–2008) was a Japanese ophthalmologist, surgeon and amateur astronomer.

He is credited by the Minor Planet Center with the discovery of 17 asteroids at the Karasuyama Observatory (889) between 1986 and 1992, all of which were co-discovered with Japanese astronomer Takeshi Urata, except for his lowest numbered discovery 3394 Banno. The inner main-belt asteroid 5484 Inoda was named in his honor on 1 September 1993 (M.P.C. 22510).
