= 7687 Matthias =

Main-belt asteroid

Discovery
- Discovered by: C. J. van Houten; I. van Houten-G. T. Gehrels
- Discovery site: Palomar Obs.
- Discovery date: 24 September 1960

Designations
- Named after: Matthias Busch (German amateur astronomer)
- Alternative designations: 2099 P-L · 1986 EH_{2} 1993 GK
- Minor planet category: main-belt · (inner); Flora

Orbital characteristics
- Epoch 23 March 2018 (JD 2458200.5)
- Uncertainty parameter 0
- Observation arc: 63.75 yr (23,284 d)
- Aphelion: 2.5327 AU
- Perihelion: 2.0074 AU
- Semi-major axis: 2.2700 AU
- Eccentricity: 0.1157
- Orbital period (sidereal): 3.42 yr (1,249 d)
- Mean anomaly: 131.81°
- Mean motion: 0° 17^{m} 17.52^{s} / day
- Inclination: 5.7774°
- Longitude of ascending node: 199.13°
- Argument of perihelion: 333.08°

Physical characteristics
- Mean diameter: 3.488±0.233 km 3.9 km (est. at 0.24)
- Geometric albedo: 0.24 (Flora albedo); 0.333±0.070
- Spectral type: S (SDSS-MOC)
- Absolute magnitude (H): 14.2

7687 Matthias, provisional designation 2099 P-L, is a stony Florian asteroid from the inner regions of the asteroid belt, approximately 4 kilometers (2 miles) in diameter. It was discovered on 24 September 1960, by Ingrid and Cornelis van Houten at Leiden, and Tom Gehrels at Palomar Observatory in California. The S-type asteroid was named for German amateur astronomer Matthias Busch.

== Orbit and classification ==
Matthias is a member of the Flora family (402), a giant asteroid family and the largest family of stony asteroids in the main-belt. It orbits the Sun in the inner asteroid belt at a distance of 2.0–2.5 AU once every 3 years and 5 months (1,249 days; semi-major axis of 2.27 AU). Its orbit has an eccentricity of 0.12 and an inclination of 6° with respect to the ecliptic. The body's observation arc begins with a precovery taken at Palomar in October 1953, or seven years prior to its official discovery observation.

=== Palomar–Leiden survey ===
The survey designation "P-L" stands for "Palomar–Leiden", named after Palomar Observatory and Leiden Observatory, which collaborated on the fruitful Palomar–Leiden survey in the 1960s. Gehrels used Palomar's Samuel Oschin telescope (also known as the 48-inch Schmidt Telescope), and shipped the photographic plates to Ingrid and Cornelis van Houten at Leiden Observatory where astrometry was carried out. The trio are credited with the discovery of several thousand asteroid discoveries.

== Physical characteristics ==
In the SDSS-based taxonomy, Matthias is a common, stony S-type asteroid. It has an absolute magnitude of 14.2. As of 2018, no rotational lightcurve of Matthias has been obtained from photometric observations. The body's rotation period, pole and shape remain unknown.

=== Diameter and albedo ===
According to the survey carried out by the NEOWISE mission of NASA's Wide-field Infrared Survey Explorer, Matthias measures 3.488 kilometers in diameter and its surface has an albedo of 0.333. Alternatively, the asteroid measures 3.9 kilometers, based on a generic magnitude-to-diameter conversion with an albedo of 0.24 – derived from 8 Flora, the parent body of the Flora family.

== Naming ==
This minor planet was named after German amateur astronomer Matthias Busch (born 1968), an observer and discoverer of minor planets at the Starkenburg Observatory in Heppenheim, Germany. The asteroid's name was proposed by Lutz Schmadel and its official citation was published by the Minor Planet Center on 8 December 1998 (M.P.C. 33387).
