= 7449 Döllen =

Main-belt asteroid

Discovery
- Discovered by: K. Reinmuth
- Discovery site: Heidelberg Obs.
- Discovery date: 21 August 1949

Designations
- Named after: Wilhelm Döllen (German astronomer)
- Alternative designations: 1949 QL · 1949 QZ; 1969 TV_{3}
- Minor planet category: main-belt · (inner); Flora

Orbital characteristics
- Epoch 23 March 2018 (JD 2458200.5)
- Uncertainty parameter 0
- Observation arc: 68.68 yr (25,085 d)
- Aphelion: 2.6599 AU
- Perihelion: 1.7865 AU
- Semi-major axis: 2.2232 AU
- Eccentricity: 0.1964
- Orbital period (sidereal): 3.31 yr (1,211 d)
- Mean anomaly: 230.21°
- Mean motion: 0° 17^{m} 50.28^{s} / day
- Inclination: 6.2648°
- Longitude of ascending node: 335.74°
- Argument of perihelion: 26.045°

Physical characteristics
- Mean diameter: 3.389±0.151 km 3.74 km (calculated)
- Synodic rotation period: 10±2.0 h
- Geometric albedo: 0.24 (assumed); 0.465±0.064
- Spectral type: S (Flora family)
- Absolute magnitude (H): 13.8; 14.3

7449 Döllen, provisional designation 1949 QL, is a stony Florian asteroid from the inner regions of the asteroid belt, approximately 3.5 kilometers (2.2 miles) in diameter. It was discovered on 21 August 1949, by German astronomer Karl Reinmuth at the Heidelberg Observatory in southwest Germany. The likely S-type asteroid has a rotation period of 10 hours. It was named after German astronomer Wilhelm Döllen.

== Orbit and classification ==
Döllen is a member of the Flora family (402), a giant asteroid family and the largest family of stony asteroids in the main-belt.

It orbits the Sun in the inner asteroid belt at a distance of 1.8–2.7 AU once every 3 years and 4 months (1,211 days; semi-major axis of 2.22 AU). Its orbit has an eccentricity of 0.20 and an inclination of 6° with respect to the ecliptic. The body's observation arc begins at Lowell Observatory in Flagstaff, the night prior to its official discovery observation at Heidelberg.

== Physical characteristics ==
Döllen is an assumed S-type asteroid, which corresponds to the overall spectral type for Florian asteroids.

=== Rotation period ===
In September 2012, a rotational lightcurve of Döllen was obtained from photometric observations by French amateur astronomer René Roy. Lightcurve analysis gave a tentative rotation period of 10 hours with a brightness amplitude of 0.10 magnitude (U=2-).

=== Diameter and albedo ===
According to the survey carried out by the NEOWISE mission of NASA's Wide-field Infrared Survey Explorer, Döllen measures 3.389 kilometers in diameter and its surface has an albedo of 0.465, while the Collaborative Asteroid Lightcurve Link assumes an albedo of 0.24 – derived from 8 Flora, the parent body of the Flora family – and calculates a diameter of 3.74 kilometers based on an absolute magnitude of 14.3.

== Naming ==
This minor planet was named after German astronomer Wilhelm Döllen (1820–1897), for his discussion on errors of heliometer observations. Döllen was an assistant of Friedrich Georg Wilhelm von Struve at the Dorpat Observatory (Tartu Observatory) in Estonia. He also worked on geodetic problems at the Pulkovo Observatory near Saint Petersburg, Russia. The official naming citation was suggested by Lutz Schmadel and published by the Minor Planet Center on 6 August 2009 (M.P.C. 66724).
