= 2975 Spahr =

Main-belt asteroid

Discovery
- Discovered by: H. Potter; A. Lokalov
- Discovery site: Cerro El Roble Stn.
- Discovery date: 8 January 1970

Designations
- Named after: Timothy Spahr (MPC director)
- Alternative designations: 1970 AF_{1} · 1957 HU; 1967 GH · 1970 AK_{1} 1970 CB · 1978 PF_{4}
- Minor planet category: main-belt · (inner) background · Flora

Orbital characteristics
- Epoch 23 March 2018 (JD 2458200.5)
- Uncertainty parameter 0
- Observation arc: 61.07 yr (22,304 d)
- Aphelion: 2.4621 AU
- Perihelion: 2.0351 AU
- Semi-major axis: 2.2486 AU
- Eccentricity: 0.0949
- Orbital period (sidereal): 3.37 yr (1,232 d)
- Mean anomaly: 44.830°
- Mean motion: 0° 17^{m} 32.28^{s} / day
- Inclination: 6.8979°
- Longitude of ascending node: 236.58°
- Argument of perihelion: 317.02°

Physical characteristics
- Mean diameter: 5.919±0.107 km 6.032±0.082 km 6.51 km (calculated)
- Synodic rotation period: 11.946±0.006 h
- Geometric albedo: 0.24 (assumed); 0.4044±0.0445; 0.419±0.085
- Spectral type: S (SDSS-MOC); S (Pan-STARRS); A (S3OS2-TH); A (S3OS2-BB)
- Absolute magnitude (H): 12.7; 13.0; 13.1; 13.81±0.38

2975 Spahr, provisional designation 1970 AF_{1}, is a bright background asteroid from the Flora region of the inner asteroid belt, approximately 6 kilometers (3.7 miles) in diameter. It was discovered on 8 January 1970, by Russian astronomers Hejno Potter and A. Lokalov at the Cerro El Roble Station near Santiago, Chile. The S- or A-type asteroid has a rotation period of 11.9 hours. It was named for Timothy Spahr, an American astronomer and former director of the Minor Planet Center.

== Orbit and classification ==
Spahr is a non-family asteroid of the main belt's background population when applying the hierarchical clustering method to its proper orbital elements. Based on osculating Keplerian orbital elements, the asteroid has also been classified as a member of the Flora family (402), a giant asteroid family and the largest family of stony asteroids in the main-belt.

It orbits the Sun in the inner asteroid belt at a distance of 2.0–2.5 AU once every 3 years and 4 months (1,232 days; semi-major axis of 2.25 AU). Its orbit has an eccentricity of 0.09 and an inclination of 7° with respect to the ecliptic.

The asteroid was first observed as 1957 HU at the Johannesburg-Hartbeespoort Observatory (076) in April 1957. The body's observation arc begins as 1967 GH at Crimea-Nauchnij in April 1967, nearly 3 years prior to its official discovery observation at Cerro El Roble.

== Physical characteristics ==
In the SDSS-based taxonomy, Spahr is a stony S-type asteroid. Pan-STARRS' survey also characterizes the body as an S-type, while in both, the Tholen- and SMASS-like taxonomy of the Small Solar System Objects Spectroscopic Survey (S3OS2), Spahr is an uncommon A-type asteroid.

=== Rotation period ===
In December 2009, a first rotational lightcurve of Spahr was obtained from photometric observations by French amateur astronomer René Roy. Lightcurve analysis gave a rotation period of 11.946 hours with a relatively high brightness amplitude of 0.47 magnitude (U=3-).

=== Diameter and albedo ===
According to the survey carried out by the NEOWISE mission of NASA's Wide-field Infrared Survey Explorer, Spahr measures between 5.919 and 6.032 kilometers in diameter and its surface has a high albedo between 0.4044 and 0.419. The Collaborative Asteroid Lightcurve Link assumes an albedo of 0.24 – derived from 8 Flora, the parent body of the Flora family – and consequently calculates a larger diameter of 6.51 kilometers using an absolute magnitude of 13.1.

== Naming ==
This minor planet was named after Timothy Bruce Spahr (born 1970), a discoverer of minor planets and comets such as 171P/Spahr and 242P/Spahr, as well as a co-discoverer of Callirrhoe and Albiorix (moon), satellites of Jupiter and Saturn, respectively. Spahr was with the photographic Bigelow Sky Survey, which searched for high-latitude minor planets using the 0.41-m Catalina Schmidt telescope. (This survey was superseded by the Catalina Sky Survey). Spahr also headed the Minor Planet Center (MPC) from 2000 to 2014. The asteroid's name was proposed by his MPC-colleges Brian Marsden, Gareth Williams and Stephen Larson, and published by the MPC on 3 May 1996 (M.P.C. 27124).
