= 7476 Ogilsbie =

Main-belt asteroid

Discovery
- Discovered by: T. B. Spahr
- Discovery site: Catalina Stn.
- Discovery date: 14 April 1993

Designations
- Named after: Brian Ogilsbie (friend of discoverer)
- Alternative designations: 1993 GE · 1971 HU
- Minor planet category: main-belt · (outer)

Orbital characteristics
- Epoch 4 September 2017 (JD 2458000.5)
- Uncertainty parameter 0
- Observation arc: 63.82 yr (23,312 days)
- Aphelion: 3.8716 AU
- Perihelion: 2.4313 AU
- Semi-major axis: 3.1514 AU
- Eccentricity: 0.2285
- Orbital period (sidereal): 5.59 yr (2,043 days)
- Mean anomaly: 120.00°
- Mean motion: 0° 10^{m} 34.32^{s} / day
- Inclination: 25.775°
- Longitude of ascending node: 57.490°
- Argument of perihelion: 145.45°

Physical characteristics
- Dimensions: 18.494±0.199; 18.996±0.118 km 27.90 km (calculated)
- Synodic rotation period: 3.92±0.01 h
- Geometric albedo: 0.057 (assumed); 0.1500±0.0264; 0.180±0.020
- Spectral type: C
- Absolute magnitude (H): 11.5 · 11.3

7476 Ogilsbie, provisional designation 1993 GE, is a carbonaceous asteroid from the outer region of the asteroid belt, approximately 20 kilometers in diameter. It was discovered by American astronomer Timothy Spahr at the U.S. Catalina Station in Tucson, Arizona, on 14 April 1993.

== Orbit and classification ==
Ogilsbie orbits the Sun in the outer main-belt at a distance of 2.4–3.9 AU once every 5 years and 7 months (2,043 days). Its orbit has an eccentricity of 0.23 and an inclination of 26° with respect to the ecliptic. The first used precovery was obtained at Palomar Observatory in 1990, extending the asteroid's observation arc by 3 years prior to its discovery. The first (unused) observation at Palomar dates back to 1953.

== Physical characteristics ==
In 2010, a photometric lightcurve analysis by Italian astronomer Andrea Ferrero at the Bigmuskie Observatory (B88) in Mombercelli, Italy, rendered a well-defined rotation period of 3.92±0.01 hours with a brightness amplitude of 0.40 in magnitude (U=3).

According to the survey carried out by the NEOWISE mission of NASA's space-based Wide-field Infrared Survey Explorer, Ogilsbie has a diameter of 18.5 and 19.0 kilometer based on an albedo of 0.15 and 0.18, respectively, while the Collaborative Asteroid Lightcurve Link assumes a standard albedo for carbonaceous asteroids of 0.057 and hence calculates a larger diameter of 27.9 kilometers.

== Naming ==
This minor planet was named in memory of Brian K. Ogilsbie (1970–1997). School mate and good friend, he is well remembered by the discoverer for the long talks they had on their excursions. The official naming citation was published by the Minor Planet Center on 27 April 2002 (M.P.C. 45336).
