= Timothy B. Spahr =

American astronomer

Minor planets discovered: 58
see § List of discovered minor planets

Timothy Bruce Spahr (born 1970) is an American astronomer and prolific discoverer of minor planets.

From 2000–2014, he worked at the Center for Astrophysics | Harvard & Smithsonian Minor Planet Center. From September 2006 to December 2014, he was the director of Minor Planet Center. He is a co-discoverer of Callirrhoe, a moon of Jupiter, and of Albiorix, a moon of Saturn. He also discovered two periodic comets: 171P/Spahr and P/1998 U4. He is credited by the Minor Planet Center with the discovery of 58 minor planets.

Dr. Spahr is currently the CEO of NEO Sciences LLC, a consulting firm specializing in characterization of Near-Earth Objects (NEOs) including PHAs (Potentially Hazardous Asteroids), Asteroid and Comet science, and planetary defense coordination. Dr. Spahr is the manager of the UN-sanctioned International Asteroid Warning Network (IAWN) and also serves on the advisory council of The Planetary Society where he is the administrator of the Shoemaker NEO Grant program.

The Florian asteroid 2975 Spahr was named after him.

== List of discovered minor planets ==
6534 Carriepeterson	24 February 1995	list
(7200) 1994 NO	8 July 1994	list
7476 Ogilsbie	14 April 1993	list
7605 Cindygraber	21 September 1995	list
(7783) 1994 JD	4 May 1994	list
7784 Watterson	5 August 1994	list
7835 Myroncope	16 June 1993	list
7885 Levine	17 May 1993	list
(8404) 1995 AN	1 January 1995	list
(8563) 1995 US	19 October 1995	list
(8893) 1995 KZ	23 May 1995	list
(9772) 1993 MB	16 June 1993	list
9799 Thronium	8 September 1996	list
(10187) 1996 JV	12 May 1996	list
(10862) 1995 QE_{2}	26 August 1995	list
11596 Francetic	26 May 1995	list
12008 Kandrup	11 October 1996	list
(12404) 1995 QW_{3}	31 August 1995	list
(13155) 1995 SB_{1}	19 September 1995	list
(13617) 1994 YA_{2}	29 December 1994	list

(14472) 1993 SQ_{14}	22 September 1993	list
(16708) 1995 SP_{1}	21 September 1995	list
17601 Sheldonschafer	19 September 1995	list
17602 Dr. G.	19 September 1995	list
(17609) 1995 UR	18 October 1995	list
(17633) 1996 JU	11 May 1996	list
(17644) 1996 TW_{8}	10 October 1996	list
(18513) 1996 TS_{5}	7 October 1996	list
(21228) 1995 SC	20 September 1995	list
(21268) 1996 KL_{1}	22 May 1996	list
22449 Ottijeff	1 November 1996	list
24827 Maryphil	2 September 1995	list
(26167) 1995 SA_{1}	18 September 1995	list
(30980) 1995 QU_{3}	31 August 1995	list
(30981) 1995 SJ_{4}	25 September 1995	list
(32859) 1993 EL	15 March 1993	list
(32896) 1994 NM_{2}	12 July 1994	list
(37652) 1994 JS_{1}	4 May 1994	list^{[A]}
(37721) 1996 TX_{8}	10 October 1996	list
(39646) 1995 SK_{4}	26 September 1995	list

(43891) 1995 SQ_{1}	21 September 1995	list
(46678) 1996 TZ_{8}	12 October 1996	list
(48717) 1996 RR_{5}	15 September 1996	list
(52471) 1995 SG_{4}	26 September 1995	list
(52529) 1996 RQ	7 September 1996	list
58373 Albertoalonso	19 September 1995	list
(65813) 1996 TT_{5}	7 October 1996	list
(69405) 1995 SW_{48}	30 September 1995	list
(69410) 1995 UB_{3}	23 October 1995	list
(73762) 1994 LS	3 June 1994	list
(85332) 1995 SH_{4}	29 September 1995	list
96268 Tomcarr	20 September 1995	list
(134372) 1995 SB_{4}	25 September 1995	list
(136704) 1995 TW	13 October 1995	list
(174368) 2002 UR_{9}	29 October 2002	list
(178338) 1995 UT_{6}	19 October 1995	list
(189796) 2002 GL_{2}	7 April 2002	list
(207975) 1996 TY_{8}	12 October 1996	list
Co-discovery made with:^{A} C. W. Hergenrother
