= 7784 Watterson =

Main-belt asteroid

Discovery
- Discovered by: T. B. Spahr
- Discovery site: Catalina Stn.
- Discovery date: 5 August 1994

Designations
- Named after: Bill Watterson (cartoonist)
- Alternative designations: 1994 PL
- Minor planet category: main-belt · Phocaea

Orbital characteristics
- Epoch 4 September 2017 (JD 2458000.5)
- Uncertainty parameter 0
- Observation arc: 63.56 yr (23,217 days)
- Aphelion: 2.8025 AU
- Perihelion: 1.7348 AU
- Semi-major axis: 2.2686 AU
- Eccentricity: 0.2353
- Orbital period (sidereal): 3.42 yr (1,248 days)
- Mean anomaly: 280.49°
- Inclination: 23.350°
- Longitude of ascending node: 220.66°
- Argument of perihelion: 107.04°

Physical characteristics
- Dimensions: 5.53 km (calculated); 5.556±0.070 km
- Synodic rotation period: 2.539±0.001 h (Note: Skiff (2011) web: rotation period 2.539±0.001 hours with a brightness amplitude of 0.10 mag. CALL assigns a Quality Code of 3-, which denotes a slightly less than secure result within the precision given and no ambiguity. Summary figures for (7784) Watterson at Collaborative Asteroid Lightcurve Link (CALL))
- Geometric albedo: 0.189±0.022; 0.23 (assumed)
- Spectral type: S
- Absolute magnitude (H): 13.5 · 13.7

7784 Watterson, provisional designation 1994 PL, is a stony Phocaea asteroid from the inner regions of the asteroid belt, approximately 6 kilometers in diameter. It was discovered by American astronomer Timothy Spahr at the U.S. Catalina Station, Arizona, on 5 August 1994. The asteroid was named after cartoonist Bill Watterson.

== Orbit and classification ==
The S-type asteroid is a member of the Phocaea family (701), a group of asteroids with similar orbital characteristics. It orbits the Sun in the inner main-belt at a distance of 1.7–2.8 AU once every 3 years and 5 months (1,248 days). Its orbit has an eccentricity of 0.24 and an inclination of 23° with respect to the ecliptic.

== Physical characteristics ==
In 2011, a photometric lightcurve analysis by astronomer Brian Skiff gave a rotation period of 2.539 hours with a relatively low brightness amplitude of 0.10 magnitude, indicative of a nearly spheroidal shape (U=3-).

According to the surveys carried out by the NEOWISE mission of NASA's Wide-field Infrared Survey Explorer (WISE), Watterson has an albedo of 0.19 and a diameter of 5.6 kilometers. The Collaborative Asteroid Lightcurve Link agrees with WISE's observations and assumes a slightly higher albedo of 0.23 and calculates a diameter of 5.5 kilometers.

== Naming ==
This minor planet is named after Bill Watterson (born 1958), cartoonist of the daily comic strip Calvin and Hobbes. Syndicated from 1985 to 1995, this strip is fondly remembered and treasured by the discoverer, and helped him stay awake and sane on long observing nights and during the trials and tribulations of graduate school.
