= JCPM Yakiimo Station =

Astronomical observatory in Japan

- Alternative names: Yakiimo Station
- Observatory code: 885
- Location: Shimizu, Shimizu-ku, Japan
- Coordinates: 34°58′N 138°28′E
- Location of JCPM Yakiimo Station

The JCPM Yakiimo Station is an astronomical observatory station located in Shimizu, Shizuoka prefecture, Japan.

It has the following observatory code: IAU-Observatory, Code 885.

It was at the JCPM Yakiimo Station that on 23 November 1990, Japanese astronomers Akira Natori and Takeshi Urata discovered the asteroid 6042 Cheshirecat.

== Other JCPM stations ==
- JCPM Hamatonbetsu Station (394)
- JCPM Kimachi Station (891)
- JCPM Oi Station (882)
- JCPM Sakura Station (393)
- JCPM Sapporo Station (392)
- JCPM Tone Station (890)
