= 7675 Gorizia =

Asteroid

Discovery
- Discovered by: Farra d'Isonzo Obs.
- Discovery site: Farra d'Isonzo Obs.
- Discovery date: 23 November 1995

Designations
- Named after: Gorizia (Italian town)
- Alternative designations: 1995 WT_{5} · 1976 UT_{19} 1993 FD_{52}
- Minor planet category: main-belt · (inner) background

Orbital characteristics
- Epoch 4 September 2017 (JD 2458000.5)
- Uncertainty parameter 0
- Observation arc: 39.64 yr (14,479 days)
- Aphelion: 2.6402 AU
- Perihelion: 2.1896 AU
- Semi-major axis: 2.4149 AU
- Eccentricity: 0.0933
- Orbital period (sidereal): 3.75 yr (1,371 days)
- Mean anomaly: 206.26°
- Mean motion: 0° 15^{m} 45.36^{s} / day
- Inclination: 4.7499°
- Longitude of ascending node: 28.333°
- Argument of perihelion: 127.73°

Physical characteristics
- Dimensions: 3 km (est. at 0.22)
- Absolute magnitude (H): 14.4

7675 Gorizia, provisional designation 1995 WT_{5}, is a background asteroid from the inner regions of the asteroid belt, approximately 3 kilometers in diameter. It was discovered on 23 November 1995, by the staff at Farra d'Isonzo Observatory in northeastern Italy. It is named for the Italian town of Gorizia.

== Orbit and classification ==
Gorizia orbits the Sun in the inner main-belt at a distance of 2.2–2.6 AU once every 3 years and 9 months (1,371 days). Its orbit has an eccentricity of 0.09 and an inclination of 5° with respect to the ecliptic. In 1976, it was first identified as 1976 UT_{19} at the Japanese Kiso Observatory, extending the body's observation arc by 19 years prior to its official discovery observation.

== Physical characteristics ==
As of 2017, Gorizia's effective size and composition, as well as its rotation period and shape remain unknown. No estimates about Gorizia's diameter and albedo have been published by any of the space-based surveys such as the Infrared Astronomical Satellite IRAS, the Japanese Akari satellite, or NASA's Wide-field Infrared Survey Explorer with its subsequent NEOWISE mission. It has an absolute magnitude of 14.4.

Based on a generic magnitude-to-diameter conversion, Gorizia measures between 3 and 7 kilometers for an albedo in the range of 0.05 to 0.25. Since asteroids in the inner main-belt are often of a silicaceous rather than of a carbonaceous composition, with higher albedos, typically around 0.20, Gorizia's diameter might be on the lower end of NASA's published conversion table, as the higher the body's reflectivity (albedo), the smaller its diameter, for a given absolute magnitude (brightness).

== Naming ==
This minor planet was named for the northeastern Italian town of Gorizia, on the occasion of the 1000th anniversary celebrating its first documented mentioning. The discovering observatory, after which the asteroid 7501 Farra was named, is located not far from Gorizia. The official naming citation was published by the Minor Planet Center on 2 February 1999 (M.P.C. 33789).
