= Nihondaira Observatory =

Astronomical observatory in Shimizu, Japan

- Observatory code: 385
- Location: Shimizu-ku, Shizuoka, Japan.
- Coordinates: 34°58′13″N 138°28′05″E
- Established: 1967

Nihondaira Observatory (also known as Oohira Station, observatory code: 385) is an astronomical observatory that is located on a hill overlooking Shimizu, Japan. It has been the source for numerous discoveries of minor planet by astronomer Takeshi Urata.

In 2007, the observatory was ranked 43rd in the number of asteroids discovered, with a total of 163, but has since lost its ranking, as the top 50 discovery sites have all discovered more than 400 bodies as of 2016. The International Astronomical Union's code for the observatory is 385. The asteroid 2880 Nihondaira, discovered by astronomer Tsutomu Seki, is named for this observatory. It is often called by its location, Shizuoka.

== See also ==
- Minoru Kizawa
