= List of minor planets: 312001–313000 =

The following is a partial list of minor planets, running from minor-planet number 312001 through 313000, inclusive. The primary data for this and other partial lists is based on JPL's "Small-Body Orbital Elements" and data available from the Minor Planet Center. Critical list information is also provided by the MPC, unless otherwise specified from Lowell Observatory. A detailed description of the table's columns and additional sources are given on the main page including a complete list of every page in this series, and a statistical break-up on the dynamical classification of minor planets.

Also see the summary list of all named bodies in numerical and alphabetical order, and the corresponding naming citations for the number range of this particular list. New namings may only be added to this list after official publication, as the preannouncement of names is condemned by the Working Group for Small Bodies Nomenclature of the International Astronomical Union.

Near-Earth obj.	MBA (inner)	MBA (outer)	Centaur
Mars-crosser	MBA (middle)	Jupiter trojan	Trans-Neptunian obj.
Unclassified

== 312001–312100 ==
Designation			Discovery			Properties		Ref
Permanent	Provisional	Named after	Date	Site	Discoverer(s)	Category	Diam.	Ref
312001 Siobhánhaughey	2007 PK_{2}	Siobhánhaughey	August 5, 2007	7300	W. K. Y. Yeung	L4	10 km	MPC · JPL
312002	2007 PL_{6}	—	August 6, 2007	Reedy Creek	J. Broughton	·	970 m	MPC · JPL
312003	2007 PM_{15}	—	August 8, 2007	Socorro	LINEAR	·	1.8 km	MPC · JPL
312004	2007 PW_{27}	—	August 14, 2007	Siding Spring	SSS	·	1.9 km	MPC · JPL
312005	2007 PG_{32}	—	August 8, 2007	Socorro	LINEAR	·	1.3 km	MPC · JPL
312006	2007 PD_{49}	—	August 8, 2007	Socorro	LINEAR	·	720 m	MPC · JPL
312007	2007 QH_{6}	—	August 21, 2007	Anderson Mesa	LONEOS	·	1.0 km	MPC · JPL
312008	2007 QB_{7}	—	August 21, 2007	Anderson Mesa	LONEOS	·	960 m	MPC · JPL
312009	2007 QR_{8}	—	August 22, 2007	Anderson Mesa	LONEOS	·	1.1 km	MPC · JPL
312010	2007 QO_{16}	—	August 18, 2007	Anderson Mesa	LONEOS	·	860 m	MPC · JPL
312011	2007 RW_{2}	—	September 3, 2007	Catalina	CSS	NYS	950 m	MPC · JPL
312012	2007 RO_{15}	—	September 12, 2007	Mount Lemmon	Mount Lemmon Survey	·	2.2 km	MPC · JPL
312013	2007 RV_{16}	—	September 12, 2007	Goodricke-Pigott	R. A. Tucker	·	1.2 km	MPC · JPL
312014	2007 RH_{18}	—	September 13, 2007	Vicques	M. Ory	·	1.3 km	MPC · JPL
312015	2007 RL_{29}	—	September 4, 2007	Catalina	CSS	·	1.1 km	MPC · JPL
312016	2007 RL_{34}	—	September 6, 2007	Anderson Mesa	LONEOS	·	1.4 km	MPC · JPL
312017	2007 RQ_{36}	—	September 8, 2007	Anderson Mesa	LONEOS	·	1.5 km	MPC · JPL
312018	2007 RJ_{45}	—	September 9, 2007	Kitt Peak	Spacewatch	·	900 m	MPC · JPL
312019	2007 RN_{45}	—	September 9, 2007	Kitt Peak	Spacewatch	·	800 m	MPC · JPL
312020	2007 RP_{48}	—	September 9, 2007	Mount Lemmon	Mount Lemmon Survey	·	970 m	MPC · JPL
312021	2007 RV_{60}	—	September 10, 2007	Catalina	CSS	·	1.4 km	MPC · JPL
312022	2007 RE_{72}	—	September 10, 2007	Kitt Peak	Spacewatch	MAS	860 m	MPC · JPL
312023	2007 RT_{75}	—	September 10, 2007	Mount Lemmon	Mount Lemmon Survey	L4	9.5 km	MPC · JPL
312024	2007 RE_{86}	—	September 10, 2007	Mount Lemmon	Mount Lemmon Survey	·	1.1 km	MPC · JPL
312025	2007 RN_{95}	—	September 10, 2007	Kitt Peak	Spacewatch	V	750 m	MPC · JPL
312026	2007 RS_{98}	—	September 10, 2007	Kitt Peak	Spacewatch	·	1.4 km	MPC · JPL
312027	2007 RL_{103}	—	September 11, 2007	Catalina	CSS	NYS	1.3 km	MPC · JPL
312028	2007 RA_{119}	—	September 11, 2007	Purple Mountain	PMO NEO Survey Program	·	1.6 km	MPC · JPL
312029	2007 RU_{125}	—	September 12, 2007	Catalina	CSS	·	1.2 km	MPC · JPL
312030	2007 RK_{133}	—	September 15, 2007	Siding Spring	SSS	·	2.3 km	MPC · JPL
312031	2007 RJ_{141}	—	September 13, 2007	Socorro	LINEAR	·	1.0 km	MPC · JPL
312032	2007 RM_{141}	—	September 13, 2007	Socorro	LINEAR	·	1.1 km	MPC · JPL
312033	2007 RR_{143}	—	September 14, 2007	Socorro	LINEAR	·	930 m	MPC · JPL
312034	2007 RA_{146}	—	September 14, 2007	Socorro	LINEAR	·	1.6 km	MPC · JPL
312035	2007 RL_{153}	—	September 10, 2007	Kitt Peak	Spacewatch	·	690 m	MPC · JPL
312036	2007 RX_{156}	—	September 11, 2007	Mount Lemmon	Mount Lemmon Survey	MAS	780 m	MPC · JPL
312037	2007 RS_{164}	—	September 10, 2007	Kitt Peak	Spacewatch	·	1.0 km	MPC · JPL
312038	2007 RT_{174}	—	September 10, 2007	Kitt Peak	Spacewatch	·	1.5 km	MPC · JPL
312039	2007 RQ_{180}	—	September 11, 2007	Mount Lemmon	Mount Lemmon Survey	·	650 m	MPC · JPL
312040	2007 RC_{185}	—	September 13, 2007	Mount Lemmon	Mount Lemmon Survey	·	860 m	MPC · JPL
312041	2007 RB_{209}	—	September 10, 2007	Kitt Peak	Spacewatch	·	860 m	MPC · JPL
312042	2007 RQ_{212}	—	September 11, 2007	Lulin	LUSS	·	940 m	MPC · JPL
312043	2007 RQ_{219}	—	September 14, 2007	Mount Lemmon	Mount Lemmon Survey	·	1.2 km	MPC · JPL
312044	2007 RS_{232}	—	September 11, 2007	Purple Mountain	PMO NEO Survey Program	(2076)	1.1 km	MPC · JPL
312045	2007 RZ_{232}	—	September 12, 2007	Mount Lemmon	Mount Lemmon Survey	·	760 m	MPC · JPL
312046	2007 RO_{239}	—	September 14, 2007	Catalina	CSS	·	1.1 km	MPC · JPL
312047	2007 RG_{240}	—	September 14, 2007	Mount Lemmon	Mount Lemmon Survey	·	1.2 km	MPC · JPL
312048	2007 RW_{241}	—	September 13, 2007	Socorro	LINEAR	MAS	670 m	MPC · JPL
312049	2007 RF_{245}	—	September 11, 2007	Kitt Peak	Spacewatch	NYS	1.0 km	MPC · JPL
312050	2007 RD_{246}	—	September 12, 2007	Catalina	CSS	·	1.0 km	MPC · JPL
312051	2007 RO_{285}	—	September 13, 2007	Mount Lemmon	Mount Lemmon Survey	NYS	1.1 km	MPC · JPL
312052	2007 RX_{286}	—	September 5, 2007	Catalina	CSS	·	1.3 km	MPC · JPL
312053	2007 RG_{298}	—	September 9, 2007	Kitt Peak	Spacewatch	NYS	1.2 km	MPC · JPL
312054	2007 RR_{309}	—	September 10, 2007	Mount Lemmon	Mount Lemmon Survey	·	790 m	MPC · JPL
312055	2007 RC_{319}	—	September 12, 2007	Catalina	CSS	·	1.0 km	MPC · JPL
312056	2007 RD_{321}	—	September 13, 2007	Socorro	LINEAR	NYS	1.3 km	MPC · JPL
312057	2007 RC_{325}	—	September 14, 2007	Mount Lemmon	Mount Lemmon Survey	·	730 m	MPC · JPL
312058	2007 ST_{5}	—	September 19, 2007	Socorro	LINEAR	NYS	950 m	MPC · JPL
312059	2007 SO_{15}	—	September 25, 2007	Mount Lemmon	Mount Lemmon Survey	·	1.6 km	MPC · JPL
312060	2007 SU_{15}	—	September 30, 2007	Kitt Peak	Spacewatch	·	850 m	MPC · JPL
312061	2007 SY_{16}	—	September 30, 2007	Kitt Peak	Spacewatch	·	900 m	MPC · JPL
312062	2007 SU_{21}	—	September 19, 2007	Kitt Peak	Spacewatch	·	940 m	MPC · JPL
312063	2007 SH_{22}	—	September 18, 2007	Socorro	LINEAR	MAS	790 m	MPC · JPL
312064	2007 SC_{23}	—	September 25, 2007	Mount Lemmon	Mount Lemmon Survey	V	780 m	MPC · JPL
312065	2007 TB_{10}	—	October 6, 2007	Socorro	LINEAR	·	1.0 km	MPC · JPL
312066	2007 TP_{12}	—	October 6, 2007	Socorro	LINEAR	MAS	1.3 km	MPC · JPL
312067	2007 TM_{13}	—	October 6, 2007	Socorro	LINEAR	·	1.9 km	MPC · JPL
312068	2007 TE_{18}	—	October 3, 2007	Needville	J. Dellinger, M. Eastman	·	1.3 km	MPC · JPL
312069	2007 TL_{18}	—	October 8, 2007	Goodricke-Pigott	R. A. Tucker	NYS	1.4 km	MPC · JPL
312070	2007 TA_{19}	—	October 9, 2007	Siding Spring	SSS	ATE · PHA	600 m	MPC · JPL
312071	2007 TJ_{22}	—	October 8, 2007	Kitt Peak	Spacewatch	·	1.8 km	MPC · JPL
312072	2007 TG_{24}	—	October 8, 2007	Kitt Peak	Spacewatch	MAS	710 m	MPC · JPL
312073	2007 TL_{29}	—	October 4, 2007	Kitt Peak	Spacewatch	·	1.2 km	MPC · JPL
312074	2007 TW_{34}	—	October 6, 2007	Kitt Peak	Spacewatch	MAS	850 m	MPC · JPL
312075	2007 TK_{39}	—	October 6, 2007	Kitt Peak	Spacewatch	NYS	1.2 km	MPC · JPL
312076	2007 TH_{41}	—	October 6, 2007	Kitt Peak	Spacewatch	NYS	1.3 km	MPC · JPL
312077	2007 TH_{43}	—	October 7, 2007	Mount Lemmon	Mount Lemmon Survey	·	1.1 km	MPC · JPL
312078	2007 TB_{45}	—	October 7, 2007	Catalina	CSS	·	1.3 km	MPC · JPL
312079	2007 TL_{49}	—	October 4, 2007	Kitt Peak	Spacewatch	NYS	1.2 km	MPC · JPL
312080	2007 TO_{50}	—	October 4, 2007	Kitt Peak	Spacewatch	·	850 m	MPC · JPL
312081	2007 TT_{60}	—	October 6, 2007	Kitt Peak	Spacewatch	·	910 m	MPC · JPL
312082	2007 TT_{62}	—	October 7, 2007	Mount Lemmon	Mount Lemmon Survey	·	1.2 km	MPC · JPL
312083	2007 TO_{75}	—	October 4, 2007	Catalina	CSS	NYS	1.3 km	MPC · JPL
312084	2007 TQ_{78}	—	October 5, 2007	Kitt Peak	Spacewatch	NYS	1.1 km	MPC · JPL
312085	2007 TN_{79}	—	October 5, 2007	Kitt Peak	Spacewatch	·	1.2 km	MPC · JPL
312086	2007 TF_{95}	—	October 7, 2007	Catalina	CSS	·	2.0 km	MPC · JPL
312087	2007 TS_{95}	—	October 7, 2007	Kitt Peak	Spacewatch	·	1.3 km	MPC · JPL
312088	2007 TQ_{97}	—	October 8, 2007	Anderson Mesa	LONEOS	NYS	1.2 km	MPC · JPL
312089	2007 TG_{99}	—	October 8, 2007	Mount Lemmon	Mount Lemmon Survey	·	980 m	MPC · JPL
312090	2007 TW_{99}	—	October 8, 2007	Kitt Peak	Spacewatch	·	1.1 km	MPC · JPL
312091	2007 TD_{104}	—	October 8, 2007	Mount Lemmon	Mount Lemmon Survey	·	1.7 km	MPC · JPL
312092	2007 TR_{108}	—	October 7, 2007	Mount Lemmon	Mount Lemmon Survey	·	1.1 km	MPC · JPL
312093	2007 TT_{108}	—	October 7, 2007	Catalina	CSS	·	840 m	MPC · JPL
312094	2007 TG_{110}	—	October 7, 2007	Mount Lemmon	Mount Lemmon Survey	·	960 m	MPC · JPL
312095	2007 TM_{114}	—	October 8, 2007	Catalina	CSS	·	1.4 km	MPC · JPL
312096	2007 TH_{122}	—	October 6, 2007	Kitt Peak	Spacewatch	·	1.4 km	MPC · JPL
312097	2007 TF_{129}	—	October 6, 2007	Kitt Peak	Spacewatch	·	1.7 km	MPC · JPL
312098	2007 TM_{130}	—	October 7, 2007	Dauban	Chante-Perdrix	V	890 m	MPC · JPL
312099	2007 TC_{131}	—	December 20, 2004	Mount Lemmon	Mount Lemmon Survey	MAS	780 m	MPC · JPL
312100	2007 TW_{133}	—	October 7, 2007	Mount Lemmon	Mount Lemmon Survey	V	680 m	MPC · JPL

== 312101–312200 ==
back to top

Designation			Discovery			Properties		Ref
Permanent	Provisional	Named after	Date	Site	Discoverer(s)	Category	Diam.	Ref
312101	2007 TX_{133}	—	October 7, 2007	Mount Lemmon	Mount Lemmon Survey	·	1.2 km	MPC · JPL
312102	2007 TV_{143}	—	October 6, 2007	Socorro	LINEAR	·	1.1 km	MPC · JPL
312103	2007 TN_{148}	—	October 7, 2007	Socorro	LINEAR	·	1.4 km	MPC · JPL
312104	2007 TX_{153}	—	October 9, 2007	Socorro	LINEAR	V	880 m	MPC · JPL
312105	2007 TN_{156}	—	October 9, 2007	Socorro	LINEAR	PHO	1.0 km	MPC · JPL
312106	2007 TO_{156}	—	October 9, 2007	Socorro	LINEAR	·	1.4 km	MPC · JPL
312107	2007 TR_{158}	—	October 9, 2007	Socorro	LINEAR	·	1.4 km	MPC · JPL
312108	2007 TS_{159}	—	October 9, 2007	Socorro	LINEAR	·	1.4 km	MPC · JPL
312109	2007 TV_{159}	—	October 9, 2007	Socorro	LINEAR	·	1.5 km	MPC · JPL
312110	2007 TJ_{162}	—	October 11, 2007	Socorro	LINEAR	·	890 m	MPC · JPL
312111	2007 TH_{167}	—	October 12, 2007	Socorro	LINEAR	·	1.0 km	MPC · JPL
312112	2007 TL_{168}	—	October 12, 2007	Socorro	LINEAR	·	1.4 km	MPC · JPL
312113	2007 TG_{173}	—	October 4, 2007	Kitt Peak	Spacewatch	·	1.1 km	MPC · JPL
312114	2007 TG_{177}	—	October 6, 2007	Kitt Peak	Spacewatch	·	1.2 km	MPC · JPL
312115	2007 TK_{181}	—	October 8, 2007	Anderson Mesa	LONEOS	·	1.5 km	MPC · JPL
312116	2007 TF_{193}	—	October 6, 2007	Kitt Peak	Spacewatch	·	980 m	MPC · JPL
312117	2007 TQ_{194}	—	October 7, 2007	Mount Lemmon	Mount Lemmon Survey	·	960 m	MPC · JPL
312118	2007 TS_{202}	—	October 8, 2007	Mount Lemmon	Mount Lemmon Survey	NYS	1.4 km	MPC · JPL
312119	2007 TY_{202}	—	October 8, 2007	Mount Lemmon	Mount Lemmon Survey	MAS	780 m	MPC · JPL
312120	2007 TW_{210}	—	October 7, 2007	Kitt Peak	Spacewatch	·	1.1 km	MPC · JPL
312121	2007 TK_{220}	—	October 8, 2007	Mount Lemmon	Mount Lemmon Survey	·	1.1 km	MPC · JPL
312122	2007 TV_{228}	—	October 8, 2007	Kitt Peak	Spacewatch	MAS	570 m	MPC · JPL
312123	2007 TS_{229}	—	October 8, 2007	Kitt Peak	Spacewatch	NYS	1.2 km	MPC · JPL
312124	2007 TG_{236}	—	October 9, 2007	Mount Lemmon	Mount Lemmon Survey	·	1.3 km	MPC · JPL
312125	2007 TT_{237}	—	October 9, 2007	Purple Mountain	PMO NEO Survey Program	V	830 m	MPC · JPL
312126	2007 TU_{239}	—	October 10, 2007	Mount Lemmon	Mount Lemmon Survey	·	1.1 km	MPC · JPL
312127	2007 TO_{246}	—	October 9, 2007	Catalina	CSS	·	2.3 km	MPC · JPL
312128	2007 TX_{248}	—	October 11, 2007	Kitt Peak	Spacewatch	V	830 m	MPC · JPL
312129	2007 TJ_{254}	—	October 8, 2007	Mount Lemmon	Mount Lemmon Survey	NYS	1.3 km	MPC · JPL
312130	2007 TH_{263}	—	October 10, 2007	Kitt Peak	Spacewatch	·	1.3 km	MPC · JPL
312131	2007 TG_{267}	—	October 9, 2007	Kitt Peak	Spacewatch	·	790 m	MPC · JPL
312132	2007 TY_{271}	—	October 9, 2007	Kitt Peak	Spacewatch	·	1.0 km	MPC · JPL
312133	2007 TT_{279}	—	October 12, 2007	Mount Lemmon	Mount Lemmon Survey	·	1.4 km	MPC · JPL
312134	2007 TZ_{282}	—	October 8, 2007	Mount Lemmon	Mount Lemmon Survey	MAS	790 m	MPC · JPL
312135	2007 TH_{284}	—	October 9, 2007	Anderson Mesa	LONEOS	·	1.6 km	MPC · JPL
312136	2007 TD_{287}	—	October 11, 2007	Catalina	CSS	·	1.5 km	MPC · JPL
312137	2007 TS_{289}	—	October 12, 2007	Catalina	CSS	NYS	1.1 km	MPC · JPL
312138	2007 TD_{297}	—	October 10, 2007	Purple Mountain	PMO NEO Survey Program	·	1.3 km	MPC · JPL
312139	2007 TY_{298}	—	October 12, 2007	Kitt Peak	Spacewatch	·	1.1 km	MPC · JPL
312140	2007 TR_{300}	—	October 12, 2007	Kitt Peak	Spacewatch	·	1.3 km	MPC · JPL
312141	2007 TW_{314}	—	October 12, 2007	Kitt Peak	Spacewatch	·	830 m	MPC · JPL
312142	2007 TP_{362}	—	October 14, 2007	Mount Lemmon	Mount Lemmon Survey	V	800 m	MPC · JPL
312143	2007 TW_{366}	—	October 9, 2007	Kitt Peak	Spacewatch	·	1.3 km	MPC · JPL
312144	2007 TW_{373}	—	October 14, 2007	Catalina	CSS	·	1.7 km	MPC · JPL
312145	2007 TM_{376}	—	October 10, 2007	Catalina	CSS	V	790 m	MPC · JPL
312146	2007 TE_{391}	—	October 14, 2007	Mount Lemmon	Mount Lemmon Survey	(5)	1.7 km	MPC · JPL
312147	2007 TG_{412}	—	October 14, 2007	Catalina	CSS	·	1.6 km	MPC · JPL
312148	2007 TY_{412}	—	October 15, 2007	Anderson Mesa	LONEOS	V	830 m	MPC · JPL
312149	2007 TE_{413}	—	October 15, 2007	Anderson Mesa	LONEOS	V	830 m	MPC · JPL
312150	2007 TJ_{424}	—	October 7, 2007	Catalina	CSS	·	1.5 km	MPC · JPL
312151	2007 TP_{432}	—	October 6, 2007	Kitt Peak	Spacewatch	MAS	730 m	MPC · JPL
312152	2007 TH_{440}	—	October 15, 2007	Mount Lemmon	Mount Lemmon Survey	·	3.5 km	MPC · JPL
312153	2007 TA_{448}	—	October 15, 2007	Kitt Peak	Spacewatch	·	1.4 km	MPC · JPL
312154	2007 UU_{6}	—	October 22, 2007	Gnosca	S. Sposetti	MAS	880 m	MPC · JPL
312155	2007 UH_{12}	—	October 19, 2007	Mount Lemmon	Mount Lemmon Survey	·	650 m	MPC · JPL
312156	2007 UN_{14}	—	December 29, 2000	Kitt Peak	Spacewatch	SUL	2.3 km	MPC · JPL
312157	2007 UH_{22}	—	October 16, 2007	Kitt Peak	Spacewatch	NYS	1.3 km	MPC · JPL
312158	2007 UR_{31}	—	October 19, 2007	Mount Lemmon	Mount Lemmon Survey	NYS	1.0 km	MPC · JPL
312159	2007 UC_{37}	—	October 19, 2007	Catalina	CSS	·	1.5 km	MPC · JPL
312160	2007 UF_{54}	—	October 30, 2007	Kitt Peak	Spacewatch	·	1.2 km	MPC · JPL
312161	2007 UP_{56}	—	October 30, 2007	Catalina	CSS	·	1.3 km	MPC · JPL
312162	2007 UE_{57}	—	October 30, 2007	Kitt Peak	Spacewatch	·	1.2 km	MPC · JPL
312163	2007 UD_{60}	—	October 30, 2007	Mount Lemmon	Mount Lemmon Survey	MAS	630 m	MPC · JPL
312164	2007 UW_{70}	—	October 30, 2007	Mount Lemmon	Mount Lemmon Survey	·	1.3 km	MPC · JPL
312165	2007 UJ_{82}	—	October 30, 2007	Kitt Peak	Spacewatch	·	1.2 km	MPC · JPL
312166	2007 UF_{87}	—	October 30, 2007	Kitt Peak	Spacewatch	NYS	1.1 km	MPC · JPL
312167	2007 UL_{91}	—	October 30, 2007	Mount Lemmon	Mount Lemmon Survey	MAS	770 m	MPC · JPL
312168	2007 UP_{96}	—	October 30, 2007	Kitt Peak	Spacewatch	MAS	630 m	MPC · JPL
312169	2007 UW_{107}	—	October 30, 2007	Kitt Peak	Spacewatch	·	940 m	MPC · JPL
312170	2007 UB_{115}	—	October 31, 2007	Kitt Peak	Spacewatch	·	1.5 km	MPC · JPL
312171	2007 UQ_{115}	—	October 31, 2007	Kitt Peak	Spacewatch	·	1.2 km	MPC · JPL
312172	2007 UA_{129}	—	October 30, 2007	Catalina	CSS	·	1.7 km	MPC · JPL
312173	2007 UZ_{135}	—	October 16, 2007	Mount Lemmon	Mount Lemmon Survey	·	1.7 km	MPC · JPL
312174	2007 UF_{142}	—	October 30, 2007	Kitt Peak	Spacewatch	V	770 m	MPC · JPL
312175	2007 VB_{2}	—	November 2, 2007	Socorro	LINEAR	·	1.9 km	MPC · JPL
312176	2007 VA_{5}	—	November 3, 2007	Dauban	Chante-Perdrix	·	1.3 km	MPC · JPL
312177	2007 VV_{5}	—	November 4, 2007	7300	W. K. Y. Yeung	NYS	1.1 km	MPC · JPL
312178	2007 VX_{9}	—	November 5, 2007	Eskridge	G. Hug	V	930 m	MPC · JPL
312179	2007 VS_{10}	—	November 5, 2007	La Sagra	OAM	·	1.3 km	MPC · JPL
312180	2007 VB_{18}	—	November 1, 2007	Mount Lemmon	Mount Lemmon Survey	·	1.2 km	MPC · JPL
312181	2007 VG_{36}	—	November 2, 2007	Mount Lemmon	Mount Lemmon Survey	·	1.2 km	MPC · JPL
312182	2007 VA_{48}	—	November 1, 2007	Kitt Peak	Spacewatch	·	1.6 km	MPC · JPL
312183	2007 VD_{50}	—	November 1, 2007	Kitt Peak	Spacewatch	V	760 m	MPC · JPL
312184	2007 VU_{62}	—	April 2, 2005	Mount Lemmon	Mount Lemmon Survey	·	1.3 km	MPC · JPL
312185	2007 VP_{63}	—	November 1, 2007	Kitt Peak	Spacewatch	·	1.3 km	MPC · JPL
312186	2007 VZ_{63}	—	November 1, 2007	Kitt Peak	Spacewatch	·	2.0 km	MPC · JPL
312187	2007 VG_{67}	—	November 2, 2007	Purple Mountain	PMO NEO Survey Program	·	1.4 km	MPC · JPL
312188	2007 VL_{88}	—	November 2, 2007	Socorro	LINEAR	·	1.2 km	MPC · JPL
312189	2007 VV_{89}	—	November 4, 2007	Socorro	LINEAR	MAS	780 m	MPC · JPL
312190	2007 VC_{91}	—	November 7, 2007	Socorro	LINEAR	·	1.2 km	MPC · JPL
312191	2007 VU_{95}	—	November 9, 2007	Bisei SG Center	BATTeRS	·	1.3 km	MPC · JPL
312192	2007 VV_{113}	—	November 3, 2007	Kitt Peak	Spacewatch	MAS	900 m	MPC · JPL
312193	2007 VQ_{123}	—	November 5, 2007	Mount Lemmon	Mount Lemmon Survey	·	1.4 km	MPC · JPL
312194	2007 VG_{148}	—	November 4, 2007	Kitt Peak	Spacewatch	·	1.6 km	MPC · JPL
312195	2007 VJ_{161}	—	November 5, 2007	Kitt Peak	Spacewatch	·	1.4 km	MPC · JPL
312196	2007 VD_{169}	—	November 5, 2007	Kitt Peak	Spacewatch	·	1.4 km	MPC · JPL
312197	2007 VK_{173}	—	November 2, 2007	Mount Lemmon	Mount Lemmon Survey	·	1.4 km	MPC · JPL
312198	2007 VB_{184}	—	November 12, 2007	Catalina	CSS	PHO	1.7 km	MPC · JPL
312199	2007 VA_{198}	—	November 8, 2007	Mount Lemmon	Mount Lemmon Survey	(5)	1.7 km	MPC · JPL
312200	2007 VT_{208}	—	November 11, 2007	Mount Lemmon	Mount Lemmon Survey	(5)	1.6 km	MPC · JPL

== 312201–312300 ==
back to top

Designation			Discovery			Properties		Ref
Permanent	Provisional	Named after	Date	Site	Discoverer(s)	Category	Diam.	Ref
312201	2007 VU_{208}	—	November 12, 2007	Catalina	CSS	·	1.5 km	MPC · JPL
312202	2007 VW_{227}	—	November 12, 2007	Mount Lemmon	Mount Lemmon Survey	·	960 m	MPC · JPL
312203	2007 VR_{244}	—	November 11, 2007	Socorro	LINEAR	PHO	1.7 km	MPC · JPL
312204	2007 VY_{252}	—	November 13, 2007	Mount Lemmon	Mount Lemmon Survey	·	1.8 km	MPC · JPL
312205	2007 VQ_{258}	—	November 15, 2007	Mount Lemmon	Mount Lemmon Survey	·	1.4 km	MPC · JPL
312206	2007 VG_{262}	—	November 13, 2007	Mount Lemmon	Mount Lemmon Survey	·	860 m	MPC · JPL
312207	2007 VS_{269}	—	November 15, 2007	Socorro	LINEAR	·	1.2 km	MPC · JPL
312208	2007 VO_{275}	—	November 13, 2007	Kitt Peak	Spacewatch	·	1.3 km	MPC · JPL
312209	2007 VM_{291}	—	November 14, 2007	Kitt Peak	Spacewatch	MAS	860 m	MPC · JPL
312210	2007 VL_{295}	—	November 13, 2007	Catalina	CSS	·	1.4 km	MPC · JPL
312211	2007 VZ_{296}	—	November 15, 2007	Catalina	CSS	·	1.9 km	MPC · JPL
312212	2007 VV_{300}	—	November 15, 2007	Anderson Mesa	LONEOS	·	1.4 km	MPC · JPL
312213	2007 VS_{313}	—	November 11, 2007	Mount Lemmon	Mount Lemmon Survey	·	1.8 km	MPC · JPL
312214	2007 VN_{314}	—	November 2, 2007	Mount Lemmon	Mount Lemmon Survey	·	990 m	MPC · JPL
312215	2007 VQ_{320}	—	November 2, 2007	Kitt Peak	Spacewatch	·	1.3 km	MPC · JPL
312216	2007 VR_{320}	—	November 3, 2007	Mount Lemmon	Mount Lemmon Survey	·	1.5 km	MPC · JPL
312217	2007 VF_{322}	—	November 13, 2007	Mount Lemmon	Mount Lemmon Survey	·	1.3 km	MPC · JPL
312218	2007 VQ_{329}	—	November 1, 2007	Kitt Peak	Spacewatch	·	1.6 km	MPC · JPL
312219	2007 VG_{334}	—	November 13, 2007	Catalina	CSS	·	2.5 km	MPC · JPL
312220	2007 WR_{1}	—	November 17, 2007	Dauban	Chante-Perdrix	NYS	1.1 km	MPC · JPL
312221	2007 WO_{36}	—	November 19, 2007	Mount Lemmon	Mount Lemmon Survey	·	1.5 km	MPC · JPL
312222	2007 WZ_{39}	—	November 17, 2007	Mount Lemmon	Mount Lemmon Survey	PHO	1.0 km	MPC · JPL
312223	2007 WK_{55}	—	November 30, 2007	Pla D'Arguines	R. Ferrando	NYS	1.2 km	MPC · JPL
312224	2007 WM_{60}	—	November 17, 2007	Kitt Peak	Spacewatch	·	1.8 km	MPC · JPL
312225	2007 XP_{1}	—	December 3, 2007	Catalina	CSS	·	1.2 km	MPC · JPL
312226	2007 XR_{10}	—	December 5, 2007	Pla D'Arguines	R. Ferrando	NYS	1.2 km	MPC · JPL
312227	2007 XQ_{40}	—	December 13, 2007	Socorro	LINEAR	·	1.8 km	MPC · JPL
312228	2007 XG_{44}	—	December 15, 2007	Kitt Peak	Spacewatch	NYS	1.3 km	MPC · JPL
312229	2007 XR_{47}	—	December 15, 2007	Catalina	CSS	·	2.2 km	MPC · JPL
312230	2007 XV_{47}	—	December 15, 2007	Kitt Peak	Spacewatch	·	1.2 km	MPC · JPL
312231	2007 XQ_{50}	—	December 6, 2007	Cerro Burek	Burek, Cerro	·	3.0 km	MPC · JPL
312232	2007 XB_{59}	—	December 14, 2007	Mount Lemmon	Mount Lemmon Survey	·	2.4 km	MPC · JPL
312233	2007 YR_{5}	—	December 16, 2007	Kitt Peak	Spacewatch	·	1.2 km	MPC · JPL
312234	2007 YO_{10}	—	December 16, 2007	Mount Lemmon	Mount Lemmon Survey	·	2.2 km	MPC · JPL
312235	2007 YS_{11}	—	December 17, 2007	Mount Lemmon	Mount Lemmon Survey	·	1.4 km	MPC · JPL
312236	2007 YM_{15}	—	December 16, 2007	Kitt Peak	Spacewatch	·	1.3 km	MPC · JPL
312237	2007 YJ_{17}	—	August 13, 2002	Palomar	NEAT	·	1.3 km	MPC · JPL
312238	2007 YM_{26}	—	December 18, 2007	Mount Lemmon	Mount Lemmon Survey	(5)	1.4 km	MPC · JPL
312239	2007 YY_{26}	—	December 18, 2007	Anderson Mesa	LONEOS	·	1.8 km	MPC · JPL
312240	2007 YJ_{27}	—	December 18, 2007	Kitt Peak	Spacewatch	·	1.7 km	MPC · JPL
312241	2007 YO_{32}	—	December 28, 2007	Kitt Peak	Spacewatch	·	1.3 km	MPC · JPL
312242	2007 YY_{35}	—	December 30, 2007	Mount Lemmon	Mount Lemmon Survey	·	1.6 km	MPC · JPL
312243	2007 YM_{42}	—	December 30, 2007	Catalina	CSS	(5)	1.7 km	MPC · JPL
312244	2007 YP_{42}	—	December 30, 2007	Catalina	CSS	·	2.6 km	MPC · JPL
312245	2007 YM_{48}	—	December 28, 2007	Kitt Peak	Spacewatch	MAS	750 m	MPC · JPL
312246	2007 YU_{48}	—	April 5, 2000	Socorro	LINEAR	·	1.4 km	MPC · JPL
312247	2007 YO_{49}	—	December 28, 2007	Kitt Peak	Spacewatch	·	2.5 km	MPC · JPL
312248	2007 YC_{59}	—	December 31, 2007	La Sagra	OAM	(5)	1.6 km	MPC · JPL
312249	2007 YK_{69}	—	December 29, 2007	Lulin	LUSS	·	1.8 km	MPC · JPL
312250	2007 YR_{70}	—	December 31, 2007	Kitt Peak	Spacewatch	·	1.2 km	MPC · JPL
312251	2008 AP	—	January 1, 2008	Kitt Peak	Spacewatch	·	2.5 km	MPC · JPL
312252	2008 AB_{1}	—	January 1, 2008	Kitt Peak	Spacewatch	·	2.3 km	MPC · JPL
312253	2008 AC_{1}	—	January 1, 2008	Catalina	CSS	EUN	1.6 km	MPC · JPL
312254	2008 AL_{2}	—	January 3, 2008	Eskridge	G. Hug	MAR	1.4 km	MPC · JPL
312255	2008 AY_{2}	—	January 7, 2008	Lulin	LUSS	·	2.7 km	MPC · JPL
312256	2008 AA_{6}	—	January 10, 2008	Mount Lemmon	Mount Lemmon Survey	·	1.2 km	MPC · JPL
312257	2008 AM_{11}	—	January 10, 2008	Mount Lemmon	Mount Lemmon Survey	·	1.4 km	MPC · JPL
312258	2008 AE_{13}	—	January 10, 2008	Mount Lemmon	Mount Lemmon Survey	·	2.2 km	MPC · JPL
312259	2008 AR_{20}	—	January 10, 2008	Mount Lemmon	Mount Lemmon Survey	·	1.6 km	MPC · JPL
312260	2008 AG_{22}	—	January 10, 2008	Mount Lemmon	Mount Lemmon Survey	·	2.2 km	MPC · JPL
312261	2008 AM_{25}	—	January 10, 2008	Mount Lemmon	Mount Lemmon Survey	·	1.6 km	MPC · JPL
312262	2008 AK_{26}	—	January 10, 2008	Mount Lemmon	Mount Lemmon Survey	·	2.2 km	MPC · JPL
312263	2008 AZ_{27}	—	January 10, 2008	Mount Lemmon	Mount Lemmon Survey	EUN	1.8 km	MPC · JPL
312264	2008 AB_{28}	—	January 10, 2008	Mount Lemmon	Mount Lemmon Survey	·	1.8 km	MPC · JPL
312265	2008 AF_{29}	—	January 1, 2008	Kitt Peak	Spacewatch	·	1.6 km	MPC · JPL
312266	2008 AW_{33}	—	January 9, 2008	Lulin	LUSS	·	1.4 km	MPC · JPL
312267	2008 AF_{34}	—	January 10, 2008	Kitt Peak	Spacewatch	·	1.3 km	MPC · JPL
312268	2008 AU_{39}	—	January 10, 2008	Mount Lemmon	Mount Lemmon Survey	·	2.1 km	MPC · JPL
312269	2008 AY_{64}	—	January 11, 2008	Mount Lemmon	Mount Lemmon Survey	·	2.3 km	MPC · JPL
312270	2008 AQ_{71}	—	January 13, 2008	Kitt Peak	Spacewatch	(5)	1.3 km	MPC · JPL
312271	2008 AO_{90}	—	January 13, 2008	Kitt Peak	Spacewatch	·	1.5 km	MPC · JPL
312272	2008 AE_{96}	—	January 14, 2008	Kitt Peak	Spacewatch	(5)	1.2 km	MPC · JPL
312273	2008 AE_{100}	—	January 14, 2008	Kitt Peak	Spacewatch	·	1.2 km	MPC · JPL
312274	2008 AD_{106}	—	January 15, 2008	Mount Lemmon	Mount Lemmon Survey	·	2.0 km	MPC · JPL
312275	2008 AN_{108}	—	January 15, 2008	Kitt Peak	Spacewatch	RAF	1.1 km	MPC · JPL
312276	2008 AV_{108}	—	January 15, 2008	Kitt Peak	Spacewatch	AGN	1.3 km	MPC · JPL
312277	2008 AT_{111}	—	January 15, 2008	Kitt Peak	Spacewatch	(5)	1.1 km	MPC · JPL
312278	2008 AE_{116}	—	January 15, 2008	Mount Lemmon	Mount Lemmon Survey	NEM	2.5 km	MPC · JPL
312279	2008 AZ_{116}	—	January 1, 2008	Kitt Peak	Spacewatch	MAR	1.2 km	MPC · JPL
312280	2008 AR_{127}	—	January 11, 2008	Kitt Peak	Spacewatch	·	950 m	MPC · JPL
312281	2008 AR_{128}	—	January 14, 2008	Kitt Peak	Spacewatch	·	1.4 km	MPC · JPL
312282	2008 AN_{137}	—	January 1, 2008	Mount Lemmon	Mount Lemmon Survey	·	1.8 km	MPC · JPL
312283	2008 BS_{13}	—	January 19, 2008	Kitt Peak	Spacewatch	·	2.1 km	MPC · JPL
312284	2008 BX_{15}	—	January 28, 2008	Lulin	LUSS	·	1.7 km	MPC · JPL
312285	2008 BX_{19}	—	January 30, 2008	Kitt Peak	Spacewatch	·	1.9 km	MPC · JPL
312286	2008 BR_{20}	—	January 30, 2008	Catalina	CSS	JUN	1.5 km	MPC · JPL
312287	2008 BS_{20}	—	January 30, 2008	Kitt Peak	Spacewatch	·	1.8 km	MPC · JPL
312288	2008 BP_{21}	—	January 30, 2008	Mount Lemmon	Mount Lemmon Survey	EOS	2.2 km	MPC · JPL
312289	2008 BV_{37}	—	January 31, 2008	Mount Lemmon	Mount Lemmon Survey	·	3.1 km	MPC · JPL
312290	2008 BQ_{38}	—	January 31, 2008	Mount Lemmon	Mount Lemmon Survey	·	1.6 km	MPC · JPL
312291	2008 BE_{39}	—	January 30, 2008	Catalina	CSS	·	1.5 km	MPC · JPL
312292	2008 BV_{44}	—	January 31, 2008	Catalina	CSS	·	4.0 km	MPC · JPL
312293	2008 BL_{52}	—	January 20, 2008	Mount Lemmon	Mount Lemmon Survey	·	3.3 km	MPC · JPL
312294	2008 CE_{1}	—	February 3, 2008	Altschwendt	W. Ries	MAR	1.3 km	MPC · JPL
312295	2008 CY_{1}	—	February 1, 2008	La Sagra	OAM	EUN	1.6 km	MPC · JPL
312296	2008 CK_{7}	—	February 2, 2008	Kitt Peak	Spacewatch	AGN	1.3 km	MPC · JPL
312297	2008 CW_{14}	—	February 3, 2008	Kitt Peak	Spacewatch	·	2.5 km	MPC · JPL
312298	2008 CQ_{17}	—	February 3, 2008	Kitt Peak	Spacewatch	·	1.4 km	MPC · JPL
312299	2008 CH_{19}	—	February 4, 2008	Purple Mountain	PMO NEO Survey Program	·	2.6 km	MPC · JPL
312300	2008 CR_{37}	—	February 2, 2008	Kitt Peak	Spacewatch	GEF	1.5 km	MPC · JPL

== 312301–312400 ==
back to top

Designation			Discovery			Properties		Ref
Permanent	Provisional	Named after	Date	Site	Discoverer(s)	Category	Diam.	Ref
312301	2008 CY_{44}	—	February 2, 2008	Kitt Peak	Spacewatch	MIS	2.7 km	MPC · JPL
312302	2008 CK_{49}	—	February 6, 2008	Catalina	CSS	·	1.8 km	MPC · JPL
312303	2008 CP_{50}	—	February 6, 2008	Anderson Mesa	LONEOS	·	2.7 km	MPC · JPL
312304	2008 CB_{51}	—	February 7, 2008	Kitt Peak	Spacewatch	·	1.5 km	MPC · JPL
312305	2008 CM_{54}	—	February 7, 2008	Catalina	CSS	·	1.5 km	MPC · JPL
312306	2008 CQ_{62}	—	February 8, 2008	Catalina	CSS	·	1.5 km	MPC · JPL
312307	2008 CJ_{64}	—	February 8, 2008	Mount Lemmon	Mount Lemmon Survey	·	2.0 km	MPC · JPL
312308	2008 CJ_{67}	—	February 8, 2008	Mount Lemmon	Mount Lemmon Survey	·	1.9 km	MPC · JPL
312309	2008 CF_{71}	—	February 3, 2008	Socorro	LINEAR	·	1.6 km	MPC · JPL
312310	2008 CP_{71}	—	February 6, 2008	Socorro	LINEAR	·	1.2 km	MPC · JPL
312311	2008 CD_{72}	—	February 9, 2008	Catalina	CSS	·	4.0 km	MPC · JPL
312312	2008 CK_{80}	—	February 7, 2008	Kitt Peak	Spacewatch	·	1.7 km	MPC · JPL
312313	2008 CL_{84}	—	February 7, 2008	Mount Lemmon	Mount Lemmon Survey	·	1.7 km	MPC · JPL
312314	2008 CB_{85}	—	February 7, 2008	Kitt Peak	Spacewatch	·	2.0 km	MPC · JPL
312315	2008 CT_{88}	—	February 7, 2008	Mount Lemmon	Mount Lemmon Survey	·	1.5 km	MPC · JPL
312316	2008 CG_{117}	—	February 9, 2008	Needville	J. Dellinger, Eastman, M.	·	2.6 km	MPC · JPL
312317	2008 CQ_{117}	—	February 11, 2008	Dauban	Kugel, F.	·	1.9 km	MPC · JPL
312318	2008 CJ_{120}	—	February 6, 2008	Catalina	CSS	·	3.3 km	MPC · JPL
312319	2008 CU_{122}	—	February 7, 2008	Mount Lemmon	Mount Lemmon Survey	(5)	1.4 km	MPC · JPL
312320	2008 CM_{123}	—	February 7, 2008	Mount Lemmon	Mount Lemmon Survey	·	1.7 km	MPC · JPL
312321	2008 CY_{127}	—	February 8, 2008	Kitt Peak	Spacewatch	WIT	1.0 km	MPC · JPL
312322	2008 CZ_{127}	—	February 8, 2008	Kitt Peak	Spacewatch	AGN	1.3 km	MPC · JPL
312323	2008 CP_{135}	—	February 8, 2008	Mount Lemmon	Mount Lemmon Survey	·	1.9 km	MPC · JPL
312324	2008 CA_{138}	—	February 8, 2008	Kitt Peak	Spacewatch	·	2.8 km	MPC · JPL
312325	2008 CK_{144}	—	February 9, 2008	Kitt Peak	Spacewatch	·	3.0 km	MPC · JPL
312326	2008 CJ_{155}	—	February 9, 2008	Mount Lemmon	Mount Lemmon Survey	·	2.3 km	MPC · JPL
312327	2008 CA_{159}	—	February 9, 2008	Catalina	CSS	·	2.0 km	MPC · JPL
312328	2008 CE_{161}	—	February 9, 2008	Kitt Peak	Spacewatch	·	2.7 km	MPC · JPL
312329	2008 CE_{162}	—	February 10, 2008	Catalina	CSS	·	1.2 km	MPC · JPL
312330	2008 CF_{169}	—	February 12, 2008	Mount Lemmon	Mount Lemmon Survey	·	2.5 km	MPC · JPL
312331	2008 CQ_{172}	—	February 13, 2008	Kitt Peak	Spacewatch	·	1.5 km	MPC · JPL
312332	2008 CU_{176}	—	February 8, 2008	Socorro	LINEAR	·	2.4 km	MPC · JPL
312333	2008 CA_{177}	—	February 9, 2008	Socorro	LINEAR	HNS	1.6 km	MPC · JPL
312334	2008 CJ_{178}	—	October 5, 2002	Palomar	NEAT	·	1.9 km	MPC · JPL
312335	2008 CQ_{179}	—	February 7, 2008	Catalina	CSS	·	3.3 km	MPC · JPL
312336	2008 CH_{182}	—	February 11, 2008	Mount Lemmon	Mount Lemmon Survey	·	1.8 km	MPC · JPL
312337	2008 CQ_{184}	—	February 11, 2008	Črni Vrh	Mikuž, H.	BAR	1.5 km	MPC · JPL
312338	2008 CK_{191}	—	February 2, 2008	Kitt Peak	Spacewatch	·	1.3 km	MPC · JPL
312339	2008 CC_{202}	—	February 2, 2008	Kitt Peak	Spacewatch	·	2.2 km	MPC · JPL
312340	2008 CJ_{205}	—	February 1, 2008	Kitt Peak	Spacewatch	·	1.8 km	MPC · JPL
312341	2008 CA_{211}	—	February 2, 2008	Kitt Peak	Spacewatch	HOF	2.5 km	MPC · JPL
312342	2008 CT_{212}	—	February 8, 2008	Mount Lemmon	Mount Lemmon Survey	·	2.7 km	MPC · JPL
312343	2008 CD_{213}	—	February 9, 2008	Mount Lemmon	Mount Lemmon Survey	·	1.5 km	MPC · JPL
312344	2008 CO_{214}	—	February 12, 2008	Kitt Peak	Spacewatch	·	2.4 km	MPC · JPL
312345	2008 DS_{2}	—	February 24, 2008	Kitt Peak	Spacewatch	(5)	1.5 km	MPC · JPL
312346	2008 DT_{2}	—	February 24, 2008	Kitt Peak	Spacewatch	·	1.7 km	MPC · JPL
312347	2008 DA_{3}	—	February 24, 2008	Kitt Peak	Spacewatch	WIT	1.0 km	MPC · JPL
312348	2008 DB_{4}	—	February 24, 2008	Mount Lemmon	Mount Lemmon Survey	·	2.3 km	MPC · JPL
312349	2008 DE_{4}	—	February 26, 2008	Piszkéstető	K. Sárneczky	·	3.3 km	MPC · JPL
312350	2008 DE_{14}	—	February 26, 2008	Mount Lemmon	Mount Lemmon Survey	·	2.5 km	MPC · JPL
312351	2008 DH_{16}	—	February 27, 2008	Kitt Peak	Spacewatch	·	2.8 km	MPC · JPL
312352	2008 DH_{19}	—	February 27, 2008	Catalina	CSS	·	1.6 km	MPC · JPL
312353	2008 DV_{21}	—	February 28, 2008	Mount Lemmon	Mount Lemmon Survey	AGN	1.2 km	MPC · JPL
312354	2008 DC_{23}	—	February 29, 2008	Grove Creek	Tozzi, F.	·	2.7 km	MPC · JPL
312355	2008 DD_{23}	—	February 29, 2008	Grove Creek	Tozzi, F.	·	2.3 km	MPC · JPL
312356	2008 DU_{30}	—	February 27, 2008	Kitt Peak	Spacewatch	·	2.0 km	MPC · JPL
312357	2008 DY_{45}	—	February 28, 2008	Catalina	CSS	·	2.8 km	MPC · JPL
312358	2008 DN_{46}	—	February 28, 2008	Mount Lemmon	Mount Lemmon Survey	·	2.5 km	MPC · JPL
312359	2008 DQ_{46}	—	February 28, 2008	Kitt Peak	Spacewatch	·	2.2 km	MPC · JPL
312360	2008 DX_{46}	—	February 28, 2008	Kitt Peak	Spacewatch	·	1.8 km	MPC · JPL
312361	2008 DY_{57}	—	February 28, 2008	Catalina	CSS	JUN	1.4 km	MPC · JPL
312362	2008 DV_{59}	—	February 27, 2008	Mount Lemmon	Mount Lemmon Survey	·	2.7 km	MPC · JPL
312363	2008 DQ_{61}	—	February 28, 2008	Mount Lemmon	Mount Lemmon Survey	·	1.8 km	MPC · JPL
312364	2008 DD_{73}	—	February 26, 2008	Mount Lemmon	Mount Lemmon Survey	·	1.7 km	MPC · JPL
312365	2008 DR_{81}	—	February 27, 2008	Mount Lemmon	Mount Lemmon Survey	·	2.9 km	MPC · JPL
312366	2008 DD_{84}	—	February 18, 2008	Mount Lemmon	Mount Lemmon Survey	EUN	1.6 km	MPC · JPL
312367	2008 DL_{89}	—	February 28, 2008	Mount Lemmon	Mount Lemmon Survey	AGN	1.7 km	MPC · JPL
312368	2008 EF_{5}	—	March 2, 2008	Purple Mountain	PMO NEO Survey Program	·	3.0 km	MPC · JPL
312369	2008 ET_{5}	—	March 2, 2008	Socorro	LINEAR	·	2.1 km	MPC · JPL
312370	2008 EV_{8}	—	March 6, 2008	Altschwendt	W. Ries	EOS	2.0 km	MPC · JPL
312371	2008 EA_{15}	—	March 1, 2008	Kitt Peak	Spacewatch	·	2.0 km	MPC · JPL
312372	2008 EK_{21}	—	March 2, 2008	Mount Lemmon	Mount Lemmon Survey	·	2.6 km	MPC · JPL
312373	2008 EH_{23}	—	March 3, 2008	Catalina	CSS	·	2.9 km	MPC · JPL
312374	2008 EW_{27}	—	March 4, 2008	Mount Lemmon	Mount Lemmon Survey	EOS	2.6 km	MPC · JPL
312375	2008 EE_{37}	—	March 4, 2008	Kitt Peak	Spacewatch	WIT	1.2 km	MPC · JPL
312376	2008 EB_{48}	—	March 5, 2008	Kitt Peak	Spacewatch	·	1.9 km	MPC · JPL
312377	2008 ES_{48}	—	March 6, 2008	Kitt Peak	Spacewatch	·	1.6 km	MPC · JPL
312378	2008 EN_{50}	—	April 13, 1994	Kitt Peak	Spacewatch	KOR	1.5 km	MPC · JPL
312379	2008 EK_{69}	—	March 10, 2008	Bisei SG Center	BATTeRS	·	1.5 km	MPC · JPL
312380	2008 EB_{70}	—	March 4, 2008	Purple Mountain	PMO NEO Survey Program	·	2.7 km	MPC · JPL
312381	2008 ED_{75}	—	March 7, 2008	Kitt Peak	Spacewatch	·	2.4 km	MPC · JPL
312382	2008 EW_{88}	—	March 8, 2008	Socorro	LINEAR	·	2.0 km	MPC · JPL
312383	2008 EW_{92}	—	March 6, 2008	Catalina	CSS	EOS	2.6 km	MPC · JPL
312384	2008 EE_{117}	—	March 8, 2008	Kitt Peak	Spacewatch	KOR	1.4 km	MPC · JPL
312385	2008 EO_{120}	—	March 9, 2008	Kitt Peak	Spacewatch	·	1.9 km	MPC · JPL
312386	2008 EU_{136}	—	March 11, 2008	Kitt Peak	Spacewatch	·	2.3 km	MPC · JPL
312387	2008 EX_{138}	—	March 11, 2008	Kitt Peak	Spacewatch	EOS	2.1 km	MPC · JPL
312388	2008 EA_{141}	—	March 12, 2008	Kitt Peak	Spacewatch	AGN	1.4 km	MPC · JPL
312389	2008 EG_{142}	—	March 12, 2008	Kitt Peak	Spacewatch	TEL	1.6 km	MPC · JPL
312390	2008 ER_{147}	—	March 1, 2008	Kitt Peak	Spacewatch	·	2.3 km	MPC · JPL
312391	2008 EO_{151}	—	March 8, 2008	Mount Lemmon	Mount Lemmon Survey	·	1.9 km	MPC · JPL
312392	2008 EF_{158}	—	March 6, 2008	Mount Lemmon	Mount Lemmon Survey	·	2.5 km	MPC · JPL
312393	2008 EE_{162}	—	March 11, 2008	Mount Lemmon	Mount Lemmon Survey	·	4.2 km	MPC · JPL
312394	2008 EO_{165}	—	March 2, 2008	Mount Lemmon	Mount Lemmon Survey	EOS ·	5.6 km	MPC · JPL
312395	2008 EQ_{166}	—	March 6, 2008	Catalina	CSS	GEF	1.7 km	MPC · JPL
312396	2008 EQ_{167}	—	March 8, 2008	Socorro	LINEAR	·	3.8 km	MPC · JPL
312397	2008 FE_{4}	—	March 25, 2008	Kitt Peak	Spacewatch	·	3.2 km	MPC · JPL
312398	2008 FN_{13}	—	March 26, 2008	Mount Lemmon	Mount Lemmon Survey	·	2.0 km	MPC · JPL
312399	2008 FX_{14}	—	March 26, 2008	Mount Lemmon	Mount Lemmon Survey	·	6.3 km	MPC · JPL
312400	2008 FG_{23}	—	March 27, 2008	Kitt Peak	Spacewatch	·	2.9 km	MPC · JPL

== 312401–312500 ==
back to top

Designation			Discovery			Properties		Ref
Permanent	Provisional	Named after	Date	Site	Discoverer(s)	Category	Diam.	Ref
312401	2008 FB_{40}	—	March 28, 2008	Kitt Peak	Spacewatch	·	2.5 km	MPC · JPL
312402	2008 FD_{48}	—	March 28, 2008	Mount Lemmon	Mount Lemmon Survey	·	4.0 km	MPC · JPL
312403	2008 FY_{51}	—	March 28, 2008	Mount Lemmon	Mount Lemmon Survey	·	2.7 km	MPC · JPL
312404	2008 FO_{52}	—	March 28, 2008	Mount Lemmon	Mount Lemmon Survey	THM	2.3 km	MPC · JPL
312405	2008 FD_{56}	—	March 28, 2008	Mount Lemmon	Mount Lemmon Survey	·	2.5 km	MPC · JPL
312406	2008 FJ_{56}	—	March 28, 2008	Kitt Peak	Spacewatch	·	1.8 km	MPC · JPL
312407	2008 FC_{69}	—	March 28, 2008	Mount Lemmon	Mount Lemmon Survey	·	1.8 km	MPC · JPL
312408	2008 FN_{71}	—	March 5, 2008	Mount Lemmon	Mount Lemmon Survey	·	3.1 km	MPC · JPL
312409	2008 FZ_{74}	—	March 31, 2008	Mount Lemmon	Mount Lemmon Survey	·	3.2 km	MPC · JPL
312410	2008 FH_{89}	—	March 29, 2008	Mount Lemmon	Mount Lemmon Survey	·	1.8 km	MPC · JPL
312411	2008 FH_{100}	—	March 30, 2008	Kitt Peak	Spacewatch	·	3.9 km	MPC · JPL
312412	2008 FK_{106}	—	April 7, 2003	Kitt Peak	Spacewatch	·	2.3 km	MPC · JPL
312413	2008 FS_{112}	—	March 31, 2008	Kitt Peak	Spacewatch	·	2.9 km	MPC · JPL
312414	2008 FH_{125}	—	March 31, 2008	Kitt Peak	Spacewatch	·	2.9 km	MPC · JPL
312415	2008 GZ_{4}	—	April 1, 2008	Kitt Peak	Spacewatch	·	1.7 km	MPC · JPL
312416	2008 GT_{6}	—	April 1, 2008	Kitt Peak	Spacewatch	HYG	2.6 km	MPC · JPL
312417	2008 GU_{6}	—	April 1, 2008	Kitt Peak	Spacewatch	·	2.2 km	MPC · JPL
312418	2008 GR_{7}	—	April 1, 2008	Mount Lemmon	Mount Lemmon Survey	·	2.3 km	MPC · JPL
312419	2008 GL_{19}	—	August 31, 2005	Palomar	NEAT	·	3.5 km	MPC · JPL
312420	2008 GU_{26}	—	April 1, 2008	Catalina	CSS	TIR	4.5 km	MPC · JPL
312421	2008 GF_{27}	—	April 3, 2008	Kitt Peak	Spacewatch	EOS	2.2 km	MPC · JPL
312422	2008 GR_{48}	—	April 5, 2008	Kitt Peak	Spacewatch	·	4.0 km	MPC · JPL
312423	2008 GV_{60}	—	April 5, 2008	Catalina	CSS	·	3.0 km	MPC · JPL
312424	2008 GC_{63}	—	April 5, 2008	Catalina	CSS	·	2.6 km	MPC · JPL
312425	2008 GE_{88}	—	March 4, 2008	Mount Lemmon	Mount Lemmon Survey	·	3.4 km	MPC · JPL
312426	2008 GL_{91}	—	April 6, 2008	Mount Lemmon	Mount Lemmon Survey	·	2.9 km	MPC · JPL
312427	2008 GJ_{94}	—	April 7, 2008	Kitt Peak	Spacewatch	·	2.6 km	MPC · JPL
312428	2008 GP_{98}	—	April 8, 2008	Kitt Peak	Spacewatch	·	3.2 km	MPC · JPL
312429	2008 GQ_{110}	—	April 3, 2008	Catalina	CSS	T_{j} (2.97) · EUP	6.0 km	MPC · JPL
312430	2008 GS_{116}	—	April 11, 2008	Kitt Peak	Spacewatch	·	3.4 km	MPC · JPL
312431	2008 GC_{123}	—	April 13, 2008	Mount Lemmon	Mount Lemmon Survey	HOF	3.3 km	MPC · JPL
312432	2008 GX_{131}	—	April 6, 2008	Mount Lemmon	Mount Lemmon Survey	·	1.7 km	MPC · JPL
312433	2008 GW_{143}	—	April 1, 2008	Kitt Peak	Spacewatch	·	3.6 km	MPC · JPL
312434	2008 HG_{18}	—	April 26, 2008	Kitt Peak	Spacewatch	·	4.7 km	MPC · JPL
312435	2008 HA_{19}	—	April 26, 2008	Mount Lemmon	Mount Lemmon Survey	·	2.8 km	MPC · JPL
312436	2008 HY_{20}	—	April 26, 2008	Catalina	CSS	·	2.3 km	MPC · JPL
312437	2008 HW_{22}	—	April 27, 2008	Kitt Peak	Spacewatch	·	1.8 km	MPC · JPL
312438	2008 HH_{28}	—	April 28, 2008	Kitt Peak	Spacewatch	·	2.1 km	MPC · JPL
312439	2008 HO_{32}	—	April 29, 2008	Mount Lemmon	Mount Lemmon Survey	VER	3.2 km	MPC · JPL
312440	2008 HF_{48}	—	April 29, 2008	Kitt Peak	Spacewatch	·	2.0 km	MPC · JPL
312441	2008 HN_{59}	—	April 1, 2008	Kitt Peak	Spacewatch	CYB	4.4 km	MPC · JPL
312442	2008 HF_{60}	—	April 28, 2008	Mount Lemmon	Mount Lemmon Survey	EOS	2.5 km	MPC · JPL
312443	2008 HS_{69}	—	April 29, 2008	Kitt Peak	Spacewatch	·	2.5 km	MPC · JPL
312444	2008 JN_{3}	—	May 3, 2008	Bisei SG Center	BATTeRS	·	4.1 km	MPC · JPL
312445	2008 JV_{3}	—	May 1, 2008	Kitt Peak	Spacewatch	·	4.1 km	MPC · JPL
312446	2008 JL_{8}	—	May 6, 2008	Tiki	Teamo, N.	·	2.3 km	MPC · JPL
312447	2008 JN_{22}	—	May 6, 2008	Siding Spring	SSS	·	2.5 km	MPC · JPL
312448	2008 JH_{25}	—	May 6, 2008	Kitt Peak	Spacewatch	VER	3.9 km	MPC · JPL
312449	2008 JA_{34}	—	May 13, 2008	Mount Lemmon	Mount Lemmon Survey	EOS	2.3 km	MPC · JPL
312450	2008 KG_{9}	—	May 27, 2008	Kitt Peak	Spacewatch	·	3.3 km	MPC · JPL
312451	2008 KP_{13}	—	May 27, 2008	Kitt Peak	Spacewatch	·	3.9 km	MPC · JPL
312452	2008 KE_{29}	—	May 29, 2008	Kitt Peak	Spacewatch	·	4.4 km	MPC · JPL
312453	2008 KA_{37}	—	May 29, 2008	Kitt Peak	Spacewatch	EOS	2.5 km	MPC · JPL
312454	2008 KO_{40}	—	May 28, 2008	Mount Lemmon	Mount Lemmon Survey	·	4.4 km	MPC · JPL
312455	2008 KV_{41}	—	May 31, 2008	Kitt Peak	Spacewatch	·	3.2 km	MPC · JPL
312456	2008 LM_{2}	—	June 1, 2008	Kitt Peak	Spacewatch	·	3.8 km	MPC · JPL
312457	2008 QH_{42}	—	August 23, 2008	Kitt Peak	Spacewatch	L4	15 km	MPC · JPL
312458	2008 QS_{42}	—	August 24, 2008	Kitt Peak	Spacewatch	L4	8.3 km	MPC · JPL
312459	2008 QG_{44}	—	August 25, 2008	Siding Spring	SSS	L4	16 km	MPC · JPL
312460	2008 QO_{44}	—	August 21, 2008	Kitt Peak	Spacewatch	·	3.9 km	MPC · JPL
312461	2008 RK_{14}	—	September 4, 2008	Kitt Peak	Spacewatch	L4 · ERY	14 km	MPC · JPL
312462	2008 RG_{17}	—	September 4, 2008	Kitt Peak	Spacewatch	L4	8.1 km	MPC · JPL
312463	2008 RZ_{20}	—	September 4, 2008	Kitt Peak	Spacewatch	L4	10 km	MPC · JPL
312464	2008 RD_{46}	—	September 2, 2008	Kitt Peak	Spacewatch	L4	8.7 km	MPC · JPL
312465	2008 RJ_{109}	—	September 2, 2008	Kitt Peak	Spacewatch	L4	8.6 km	MPC · JPL
312466	2008 RZ_{122}	—	September 5, 2008	Kitt Peak	Spacewatch	L4	9.5 km	MPC · JPL
312467	2008 SH_{50}	—	September 20, 2008	Mount Lemmon	Mount Lemmon Survey	L4	9.1 km	MPC · JPL
312468	2008 SY_{61}	—	September 21, 2008	Kitt Peak	Spacewatch	L4	8.3 km	MPC · JPL
312469	2008 SN_{83}	—	September 27, 2008	Altschwendt	W. Ries	L4	8.3 km	MPC · JPL
312470	2008 SQ_{134}	—	September 23, 2008	Kitt Peak	Spacewatch	H	670 m	MPC · JPL
312471	2008 ST_{153}	—	September 22, 2008	Socorro	LINEAR	L4	15 km	MPC · JPL
312472	2008 SX_{216}	—	September 29, 2008	Mount Lemmon	Mount Lemmon Survey	L4	8.2 km	MPC · JPL
312473	2008 SX_{245}	—	September 29, 2008	Mount Lemmon	Mount Lemmon Survey	AMO +1km	870 m	MPC · JPL
312474	2008 SP_{252}	—	September 19, 2008	Kitt Peak	Spacewatch	L4	14 km	MPC · JPL
312475	2008 SW_{275}	—	September 23, 2008	Mount Lemmon	Mount Lemmon Survey	L4	8.0 km	MPC · JPL
312476	2008 SJ_{277}	—	September 24, 2008	Mount Lemmon	Mount Lemmon Survey	L4	14 km	MPC · JPL
312477	2008 SD_{278}	—	September 28, 2008	Mount Lemmon	Mount Lemmon Survey	L4	8.4 km	MPC · JPL
312478	2008 SN_{293}	—	September 29, 2008	Catalina	CSS	L4	11 km	MPC · JPL
312479	2008 TX_{35}	—	October 1, 2008	Mount Lemmon	Mount Lemmon Survey	L4	7.9 km	MPC · JPL
312480	2008 TN_{49}	—	October 2, 2008	Kitt Peak	Spacewatch	L4	12 km	MPC · JPL
312481	2008 TA_{111}	—	October 6, 2008	Catalina	CSS	H	620 m	MPC · JPL
312482	2008 TE_{127}	—	October 8, 2008	Mount Lemmon	Mount Lemmon Survey	L4	12 km	MPC · JPL
312483	2008 TD_{174}	—	October 2, 2008	Mount Lemmon	Mount Lemmon Survey	L4	8.6 km	MPC · JPL
312484	2008 UL_{15}	—	October 18, 2008	Kitt Peak	Spacewatch	L4	9.5 km	MPC · JPL
312485	2008 UJ_{90}	—	October 27, 2008	Mount Lemmon	Mount Lemmon Survey	H	820 m	MPC · JPL
312486	2008 UE_{190}	—	October 25, 2008	Mount Lemmon	Mount Lemmon Survey	L4	9.0 km	MPC · JPL
312487	2008 UZ_{235}	—	October 26, 2008	Mount Lemmon	Mount Lemmon Survey	L4	10 km	MPC · JPL
312488	2008 VH_{68}	—	November 2, 2008	Mount Lemmon	Mount Lemmon Survey	·	770 m	MPC · JPL
312489	2008 WR_{108}	—	November 30, 2008	Catalina	CSS	H	860 m	MPC · JPL
312490	2008 WA_{126}	—	November 24, 2008	Mount Lemmon	Mount Lemmon Survey	·	680 m	MPC · JPL
312491	2008 YN_{29}	—	December 27, 2008	Bisei SG Center	BATTeRS	·	990 m	MPC · JPL
312492	2008 YR_{108}	—	December 29, 2008	Kitt Peak	Spacewatch	·	1.1 km	MPC · JPL
312493	2008 YK_{146}	—	December 30, 2008	Kitt Peak	Spacewatch	·	640 m	MPC · JPL
312494	2009 AJ_{13}	—	January 2, 2009	Mount Lemmon	Mount Lemmon Survey	·	1.1 km	MPC · JPL
312495	2009 AP_{49}	—	January 1, 2009	Mount Lemmon	Mount Lemmon Survey	·	950 m	MPC · JPL
312496	2009 BM_{9}	—	January 18, 2009	Socorro	LINEAR	·	1.0 km	MPC · JPL
312497	2009 BR_{60}	—	January 17, 2009	Mount Lemmon	Mount Lemmon Survey	·	760 m	MPC · JPL
312498	2009 BL_{85}	—	January 25, 2009	Kitt Peak	Spacewatch	V	700 m	MPC · JPL
312499	2009 BQ_{86}	—	January 25, 2009	Kitt Peak	Spacewatch	·	1.6 km	MPC · JPL
312500	2009 BX_{107}	—	January 29, 2009	Mount Lemmon	Mount Lemmon Survey	·	810 m	MPC · JPL

== 312501–312600 ==
back to top

Designation			Discovery			Properties		Ref
Permanent	Provisional	Named after	Date	Site	Discoverer(s)	Category	Diam.	Ref
312501	2009 BU_{150}	—	January 27, 2009	Purple Mountain	PMO NEO Survey Program	·	910 m	MPC · JPL
312502	2009 BP_{151}	—	January 29, 2009	Mount Lemmon	Mount Lemmon Survey	·	1.0 km	MPC · JPL
312503	2009 BX_{152}	—	January 31, 2009	Kitt Peak	Spacewatch	·	1.4 km	MPC · JPL
312504	2009 BY_{155}	—	January 31, 2009	Kitt Peak	Spacewatch	·	1.3 km	MPC · JPL
312505	2009 BP_{166}	—	January 31, 2009	Mount Lemmon	Mount Lemmon Survey	NYS	1.5 km	MPC · JPL
312506	2009 BY_{175}	—	January 31, 2009	Kitt Peak	Spacewatch	·	1.1 km	MPC · JPL
312507	2009 BB_{176}	—	January 31, 2009	Mount Lemmon	Mount Lemmon Survey	V	930 m	MPC · JPL
312508	2009 BL_{178}	—	January 20, 2009	Mount Lemmon	Mount Lemmon Survey	NYS	960 m	MPC · JPL
312509	2009 BZ_{178}	—	January 20, 2009	Mount Lemmon	Mount Lemmon Survey	·	840 m	MPC · JPL
312510	2009 BE_{190}	—	January 20, 2009	Mount Lemmon	Mount Lemmon Survey	·	1.9 km	MPC · JPL
312511	2009 CO_{20}	—	February 1, 2009	Kitt Peak	Spacewatch	·	890 m	MPC · JPL
312512	2009 CF_{44}	—	February 14, 2009	Kitt Peak	Spacewatch	·	1.1 km	MPC · JPL
312513	2009 CD_{57}	—	February 14, 2009	Kitt Peak	Spacewatch	·	1.3 km	MPC · JPL
312514	2009 DB_{9}	—	February 19, 2009	Mount Lemmon	Mount Lemmon Survey	·	770 m	MPC · JPL
312515	2009 DD_{15}	—	February 16, 2009	La Sagra	OAM	·	870 m	MPC · JPL
312516	2009 DF_{17}	—	February 16, 2009	Kitt Peak	Spacewatch	·	1.0 km	MPC · JPL
312517	2009 DD_{21}	—	February 19, 2009	Kitt Peak	Spacewatch	MAS	870 m	MPC · JPL
312518	2009 DU_{31}	—	February 20, 2009	Kitt Peak	Spacewatch	·	980 m	MPC · JPL
312519	2009 DO_{32}	—	February 20, 2009	Kitt Peak	Spacewatch	·	1.5 km	MPC · JPL
312520	2009 DE_{33}	—	February 20, 2009	Kitt Peak	Spacewatch	NYS	750 m	MPC · JPL
312521	2009 DV_{44}	—	February 27, 2009	Dauban	Kugel, F.	·	680 m	MPC · JPL
312522	2009 DQ_{48}	—	February 19, 2009	Kitt Peak	Spacewatch	·	980 m	MPC · JPL
312523	2009 DN_{66}	—	February 24, 2009	Mount Lemmon	Mount Lemmon Survey	·	720 m	MPC · JPL
312524	2009 DP_{66}	—	February 24, 2009	Mount Lemmon	Mount Lemmon Survey	·	850 m	MPC · JPL
312525	2009 DS_{73}	—	February 26, 2009	Kitt Peak	Spacewatch	·	2.0 km	MPC · JPL
312526	2009 DK_{75}	—	February 19, 2009	Mount Lemmon	Mount Lemmon Survey	V	800 m	MPC · JPL
312527	2009 DM_{106}	—	November 3, 2007	Kitt Peak	Spacewatch	·	1.3 km	MPC · JPL
312528	2009 DX_{109}	—	February 19, 2009	Kitt Peak	Spacewatch	·	910 m	MPC · JPL
312529	2009 DY_{109}	—	February 19, 2009	Kitt Peak	Spacewatch	·	950 m	MPC · JPL
312530	2009 DL_{124}	—	February 19, 2009	Kitt Peak	Spacewatch	·	2.2 km	MPC · JPL
312531	2009 DB_{130}	—	February 27, 2009	Kitt Peak	Spacewatch	MAS	710 m	MPC · JPL
312532	2009 DY_{133}	—	February 28, 2009	Kitt Peak	Spacewatch	·	1.4 km	MPC · JPL
312533	2009 DY_{140}	—	February 24, 2009	Mount Lemmon	Mount Lemmon Survey	·	2.2 km	MPC · JPL
312534	2009 DH_{142}	—	February 27, 2009	Siding Spring	SSS	·	3.7 km	MPC · JPL
312535	2009 EY_{2}	—	March 5, 2009	Cerro Burek	Burek, Cerro	TIR	3.4 km	MPC · JPL
312536	2009 EE_{16}	—	March 15, 2009	Kitt Peak	Spacewatch	MAS	950 m	MPC · JPL
312537	2009 EM_{18}	—	March 15, 2009	Kitt Peak	Spacewatch	EOS	1.7 km	MPC · JPL
312538	2009 EH_{20}	—	March 15, 2009	La Sagra	OAM	·	1.1 km	MPC · JPL
312539	2009 ES_{20}	—	March 15, 2009	Kitt Peak	Spacewatch	·	760 m	MPC · JPL
312540	2009 ER_{21}	—	March 15, 2009	Siding Spring	SSS	PHO	3.2 km	MPC · JPL
312541	2009 EU_{26}	—	March 1, 2009	Catalina	CSS	·	960 m	MPC · JPL
312542	2009 FC_{1}	—	March 17, 2009	Vicques	M. Ory	·	1.4 km	MPC · JPL
312543	2009 FP_{5}	—	March 16, 2009	Kitt Peak	Spacewatch	·	620 m	MPC · JPL
312544	2009 FA_{7}	—	March 16, 2009	Kitt Peak	Spacewatch	·	830 m	MPC · JPL
312545	2009 FO_{9}	—	March 16, 2009	Purple Mountain	PMO NEO Survey Program	·	760 m	MPC · JPL
312546	2009 FV_{19}	—	March 22, 2009	Raheny	Grennan, D.	·	850 m	MPC · JPL
312547	2009 FG_{23}	—	March 21, 2009	Kitt Peak	Spacewatch	·	1.1 km	MPC · JPL
312548	2009 FQ_{24}	—	March 20, 2009	La Sagra	OAM	·	920 m	MPC · JPL
312549	2009 FE_{29}	—	December 11, 2004	Kitt Peak	Spacewatch	(2076)	1.1 km	MPC · JPL
312550	2009 FZ_{34}	—	March 24, 2009	Mount Lemmon	Mount Lemmon Survey	·	1.1 km	MPC · JPL
312551	2009 FL_{39}	—	March 25, 2009	Purple Mountain	PMO NEO Survey Program	·	1.2 km	MPC · JPL
312552	2009 FB_{41}	—	March 20, 2009	La Sagra	OAM	V	850 m	MPC · JPL
312553	2009 FD_{51}	—	March 28, 2009	Kitt Peak	Spacewatch	(5)	1.9 km	MPC · JPL
312554	2009 FF_{61}	—	March 21, 2009	Mount Lemmon	Mount Lemmon Survey	·	980 m	MPC · JPL
312555	2009 FS_{66}	—	March 23, 2009	Mount Lemmon	Mount Lemmon Survey	·	700 m	MPC · JPL
312556	2009 FW_{68}	—	March 16, 2009	Kitt Peak	Spacewatch	·	1 km	MPC · JPL
312557	2009 FW_{69}	—	March 18, 2009	Kitt Peak	Spacewatch	·	1.9 km	MPC · JPL
312558	2009 GC	—	April 2, 2009	Taunus	E. Schwab, R. Kling	·	1.1 km	MPC · JPL
312559	2009 GH_{2}	—	April 1, 2009	Catalina	CSS	H	790 m	MPC · JPL
312560	2009 GQ_{4}	—	April 3, 2009	Cerro Burek	Burek, Cerro	·	2.3 km	MPC · JPL
312561	2009 HL	—	April 18, 2009	Tzec Maun	Tozzi, F.	PHO	1.3 km	MPC · JPL
312562	2009 HQ_{1}	—	April 17, 2009	Catalina	CSS	NYS	1.3 km	MPC · JPL
312563	2009 HO_{2}	—	April 18, 2009	Vicques	M. Ory	·	1.5 km	MPC · JPL
312564	2009 HN_{4}	—	April 17, 2009	Kitt Peak	Spacewatch	·	1.7 km	MPC · JPL
312565	2009 HD_{7}	—	April 17, 2009	Kitt Peak	Spacewatch	·	1.2 km	MPC · JPL
312566	2009 HL_{7}	—	April 17, 2009	Kitt Peak	Spacewatch	·	1.5 km	MPC · JPL
312567	2009 HJ_{10}	—	April 18, 2009	Kitt Peak	Spacewatch	·	1.7 km	MPC · JPL
312568	2009 HM_{19}	—	April 19, 2009	Catalina	CSS	·	2.2 km	MPC · JPL
312569	2009 HX_{19}	—	April 17, 2009	Catalina	CSS	·	1.9 km	MPC · JPL
312570	2009 HT_{38}	—	April 18, 2009	Kitt Peak	Spacewatch	·	1.5 km	MPC · JPL
312571	2009 HR_{41}	—	April 20, 2009	Kitt Peak	Spacewatch	(5)	2.5 km	MPC · JPL
312572	2009 HB_{42}	—	April 20, 2009	Kitt Peak	Spacewatch	·	2.2 km	MPC · JPL
312573	2009 HF_{57}	—	April 22, 2009	Mount Lemmon	Mount Lemmon Survey	·	1.4 km	MPC · JPL
312574	2009 HR_{65}	—	April 23, 2009	Kitt Peak	Spacewatch	·	2.3 km	MPC · JPL
312575	2009 HN_{67}	—	August 31, 2005	Palomar	NEAT	·	2.8 km	MPC · JPL
312576	2009 HR_{69}	—	April 22, 2009	Mount Lemmon	Mount Lemmon Survey	·	1.8 km	MPC · JPL
312577	2009 HE_{75}	—	April 27, 2009	Catalina	CSS	·	3.6 km	MPC · JPL
312578	2009 HT_{76}	—	April 27, 2009	Catalina	CSS	·	1.9 km	MPC · JPL
312579	2009 HY_{77}	—	April 27, 2009	Purple Mountain	PMO NEO Survey Program	·	2.4 km	MPC · JPL
312580	2009 HZ_{78}	—	April 26, 2009	Kitt Peak	Spacewatch	·	2.0 km	MPC · JPL
312581	2009 HG_{80}	—	April 28, 2009	Catalina	CSS	·	1.4 km	MPC · JPL
312582	2009 HN_{80}	—	April 28, 2009	Catalina	CSS	·	1.7 km	MPC · JPL
312583	2009 HH_{81}	—	April 28, 2009	Skylive	Tozzi, F.	EUN	2.0 km	MPC · JPL
312584	2009 HO_{81}	—	April 24, 2009	Cerro Burek	Burek, Cerro	·	1.8 km	MPC · JPL
312585	2009 HW_{82}	—	April 26, 2009	Kitt Peak	Spacewatch	·	1.2 km	MPC · JPL
312586	2009 HS_{88}	—	April 30, 2009	La Sagra	OAM	·	3.2 km	MPC · JPL
312587	2009 HW_{89}	—	April 30, 2009	La Sagra	OAM	·	1.8 km	MPC · JPL
312588	2009 HZ_{99}	—	April 26, 2009	Purple Mountain	PMO NEO Survey Program	·	2.1 km	MPC · JPL
312589	2009 HR_{102}	—	April 23, 2009	Kitt Peak	Spacewatch	·	2.4 km	MPC · JPL
312590	2009 HT_{106}	—	April 17, 2009	Catalina	CSS	·	990 m	MPC · JPL
312591	2009 JZ_{11}	—	May 15, 2009	Catalina	CSS	·	2.1 km	MPC · JPL
312592	2009 JA_{16}	—	May 14, 2009	Kitt Peak	Spacewatch	·	1.7 km	MPC · JPL
312593	2009 KN_{2}	—	May 18, 2009	Bergisch Gladbach	W. Bickel	EUN	1.5 km	MPC · JPL
312594	2009 KM_{3}	—	May 23, 2009	Sierra Stars	R. Matson	·	2.4 km	MPC · JPL
312595	2009 KJ_{6}	—	May 25, 2009	Kitt Peak	Spacewatch	·	2.4 km	MPC · JPL
312596	2009 KD_{9}	—	May 24, 2009	Catalina	CSS	EUN	1.6 km	MPC · JPL
312597	2009 KY_{14}	—	May 26, 2009	Catalina	CSS	·	2.3 km	MPC · JPL
312598	2009 KG_{22}	—	May 17, 2009	Kitt Peak	Spacewatch	·	2.3 km	MPC · JPL
312599	2009 KP_{26}	—	May 29, 2009	Kitt Peak	Spacewatch	·	3.1 km	MPC · JPL
312600	2009 KF_{34}	—	September 26, 2006	Kitt Peak	Spacewatch	·	1.3 km	MPC · JPL

== 312601–312700 ==
back to top

Designation			Discovery			Properties		Ref
Permanent	Provisional	Named after	Date	Site	Discoverer(s)	Category	Diam.	Ref
312601	2009 KW_{35}	—	May 18, 2009	Mount Lemmon	Mount Lemmon Survey	·	4.0 km	MPC · JPL
312602	2009 LZ_{1}	—	June 12, 2009	Kitt Peak	Spacewatch	·	2.6 km	MPC · JPL
312603	2009 LU_{6}	—	June 1, 2009	Mount Lemmon	Mount Lemmon Survey	MAR	1.5 km	MPC · JPL
312604	2009 OK_{3}	—	July 19, 2009	La Sagra	OAM	·	5.5 km	MPC · JPL
312605	2009 OG_{6}	—	July 19, 2009	La Sagra	OAM	·	4.2 km	MPC · JPL
312606	2009 PX_{14}	—	August 15, 2009	Catalina	CSS	·	4.2 km	MPC · JPL
312607	2009 RJ_{21}	—	November 29, 2005	Kitt Peak	Spacewatch	EOS	3.0 km	MPC · JPL
312608	2009 RU_{53}	—	September 15, 2009	Kitt Peak	Spacewatch	L4	8.2 km	MPC · JPL
312609	2009 RW_{55}	—	September 15, 2009	Kitt Peak	Spacewatch	L4	12 km	MPC · JPL
312610	2009 RA_{63}	—	September 12, 2009	Kitt Peak	Spacewatch	L4	10 km	MPC · JPL
312611	2009 RY_{68}	—	September 15, 2009	Kitt Peak	Spacewatch	L4	8.6 km	MPC · JPL
312612	2009 SE_{74}	—	September 17, 2009	Kitt Peak	Spacewatch	L4	10 km	MPC · JPL
312613	2009 SB_{112}	—	September 18, 2009	Kitt Peak	Spacewatch	·	2.6 km	MPC · JPL
312614	2009 SQ_{120}	—	September 18, 2009	Kitt Peak	Spacewatch	L4	10 km	MPC · JPL
312615	2009 SJ_{137}	—	September 18, 2009	Kitt Peak	Spacewatch	L4	8.8 km	MPC · JPL
312616	2009 SF_{141}	—	July 30, 2008	Kitt Peak	Spacewatch	L4	7.9 km	MPC · JPL
312617	2009 SZ_{199}	—	July 30, 2008	Kitt Peak	Spacewatch	L4	10 km	MPC · JPL
312618	2009 SQ_{246}	—	September 17, 2009	Kitt Peak	Spacewatch	L4	6.6 km	MPC · JPL
312619	2009 SS_{246}	—	November 30, 2000	Apache Point	SDSS	L4	10 km	MPC · JPL
312620	2009 SA_{252}	—	September 21, 2009	Kitt Peak	Spacewatch	L4 · ERY	8.0 km	MPC · JPL
312621	2009 SZ_{269}	—	September 24, 2009	Kitt Peak	Spacewatch	L4	8.7 km	MPC · JPL
312622	2009 SH_{313}	—	September 18, 2009	Kitt Peak	Spacewatch	L4 · ERY	9.6 km	MPC · JPL
312623	2009 SQ_{346}	—	September 22, 2009	Kitt Peak	Spacewatch	L4	8.0 km	MPC · JPL
312624	2009 SB_{355}	—	September 6, 2008	Kitt Peak	Spacewatch	L4	8.5 km	MPC · JPL
312625	2009 SK_{356}	—	September 16, 2009	Kitt Peak	Spacewatch	L4	8.2 km	MPC · JPL
312626	2009 TU_{15}	—	October 1, 2009	Mount Lemmon	Mount Lemmon Survey	L4	16 km	MPC · JPL
312627 Brigitteyagüe	2009 TS_{26}	Brigitteyagüe	October 14, 2009	La Sagra	OAM	L4	10 km	MPC · JPL
312628	2009 UA_{36}	—	October 22, 2009	Mount Lemmon	Mount Lemmon Survey	L4	7.8 km	MPC · JPL
312629	2009 UB_{101}	—	October 23, 2009	Mount Lemmon	Mount Lemmon Survey	L4	9.0 km	MPC · JPL
312630	2009 UB_{107}	—	October 22, 2009	Mount Lemmon	Mount Lemmon Survey	L4	10 km	MPC · JPL
312631	2009 UR_{145}	—	October 21, 2009	Catalina	CSS	L4	17 km	MPC · JPL
312632	2009 UY_{148}	—	October 17, 2009	Mount Lemmon	Mount Lemmon Survey	L4	10 km	MPC · JPL
312633	2009 WE_{5}	—	November 16, 2009	Kitt Peak	Spacewatch	L4	12 km	MPC · JPL
312634	2009 WM_{59}	—	November 16, 2009	Mount Lemmon	Mount Lemmon Survey	L4	11 km	MPC · JPL
312635	2009 WC_{221}	—	November 16, 2009	Mount Lemmon	Mount Lemmon Survey	L4	8.5 km	MPC · JPL
312636	2009 WG_{229}	—	November 17, 2009	Mount Lemmon	Mount Lemmon Survey	L4	8.7 km	MPC · JPL
312637	2010 AP_{85}	—	October 2, 2009	Mount Lemmon	Mount Lemmon Survey	L4	9.5 km	MPC · JPL
312638	2010 AP_{111}	—	May 14, 2004	Kitt Peak	Spacewatch	L4	12 km	MPC · JPL
312639	2010 BX_{15}	—	January 16, 2010	WISE	WISE	L4	11 km	MPC · JPL
312640	2010 BJ_{43}	—	October 26, 2009	Mount Lemmon	Mount Lemmon Survey	L4	11 km	MPC · JPL
312641	2010 BF_{52}	—	April 11, 2002	Palomar	NEAT	L4	15 km	MPC · JPL
312642	2010 BH_{62}	—	January 21, 2010	WISE	WISE	L4	12 km	MPC · JPL
312643	2010 BZ_{111}	—	October 9, 2009	Kitt Peak	Spacewatch	L4	14 km	MPC · JPL
312644	2010 CO_{31}	—	February 9, 2010	Mount Lemmon	Mount Lemmon Survey	·	3.8 km	MPC · JPL
312645	2010 EP_{65}	—	March 9, 2010	La Silla	D. L. Rabinowitz, S. Tourtellotte	twotino	304 km	MPC · JPL
312646	2010 EY_{91}	—	August 19, 1995	La Silla	C.-I. Lagerkvist	(5)	2.0 km	MPC · JPL
312647	2010 GM_{101}	—	April 5, 2010	Kitt Peak	Spacewatch	·	1.0 km	MPC · JPL
312648	2010 JY_{18}	—	May 3, 2010	WISE	WISE	·	2.8 km	MPC · JPL
312649	2010 JP_{47}	—	May 3, 2010	Kitt Peak	Spacewatch	·	2.3 km	MPC · JPL
312650	2010 JJ_{110}	—	March 10, 2007	Catalina	CSS	H	940 m	MPC · JPL
312651	2010 JG_{124}	—	May 6, 2010	Catalina	CSS	H	780 m	MPC · JPL
312652	2010 KY_{20}	—	May 17, 2010	WISE	WISE	·	2.6 km	MPC · JPL
312653	2010 KQ_{36}	—	May 18, 2010	La Sagra	OAM	PHO	1.2 km	MPC · JPL
312654	2010 KT_{41}	—	May 20, 2010	WISE	WISE	PHO	2.2 km	MPC · JPL
312655	2010 KS_{50}	—	May 22, 2010	WISE	WISE	·	2.5 km	MPC · JPL
312656	2010 KJ_{63}	—	May 23, 2010	WISE	WISE	EOS	3.0 km	MPC · JPL
312657	2010 KW_{78}	—	May 25, 2010	WISE	WISE	·	4.0 km	MPC · JPL
312658	2010 KX_{78}	—	October 1, 2005	Catalina	CSS	·	4.7 km	MPC · JPL
312659	2010 KV_{90}	—	May 27, 2010	WISE	WISE	·	3.3 km	MPC · JPL
312660	2010 KS_{95}	—	May 27, 2010	WISE	WISE	·	3.0 km	MPC · JPL
312661	2010 KL_{114}	—	May 30, 2010	WISE	WISE	T_{j} (2.99) · 3:2	5.7 km	MPC · JPL
312662	2010 LZ_{11}	—	June 2, 2010	WISE	WISE	·	2.6 km	MPC · JPL
312663	2010 LB_{12}	—	June 2, 2010	WISE	WISE	(194)	2.6 km	MPC · JPL
312664	2010 LD_{12}	—	June 2, 2010	WISE	WISE	(159)	4.4 km	MPC · JPL
312665	2010 LY_{15}	—	June 1, 2010	Nogales	Tenagra II	·	730 m	MPC · JPL
312666	2010 LS_{17}	—	June 3, 2010	WISE	WISE	VER	4.1 km	MPC · JPL
312667	2010 LH_{53}	—	June 8, 2010	WISE	WISE	(194)	2.3 km	MPC · JPL
312668	2010 LJ_{57}	—	June 9, 2010	WISE	WISE	·	6.4 km	MPC · JPL
312669	2010 LR_{62}	—	June 6, 2010	Kitt Peak	Spacewatch	·	2.3 km	MPC · JPL
312670	2010 LM_{92}	—	June 12, 2010	WISE	WISE	·	3.0 km	MPC · JPL
312671	2010 LP_{103}	—	June 13, 2010	WISE	WISE	TEL ·	3.9 km	MPC · JPL
312672	2010 LU_{113}	—	June 13, 2010	Catalina	CSS	·	2.4 km	MPC · JPL
312673	2010 MD_{11}	—	November 30, 2005	Mount Lemmon	Mount Lemmon Survey	LUT	5.1 km	MPC · JPL
312674	2010 MF_{20}	—	June 18, 2010	WISE	WISE	·	3.1 km	MPC · JPL
312675	2010 MF_{28}	—	June 19, 2010	WISE	WISE	NAE	4.6 km	MPC · JPL
312676 Posner	2010 MF_{36}	Posner	January 19, 2007	Mauna Kea	P. A. Wiegert	·	2.2 km	MPC · JPL
312677	2010 MK_{63}	—	June 24, 2010	WISE	WISE	PHO	1.9 km	MPC · JPL
312678	2010 MP_{71}	—	August 29, 2005	Kitt Peak	Spacewatch	·	3.4 km	MPC · JPL
312679	2010 MJ_{73}	—	June 26, 2010	WISE	WISE	·	2.2 km	MPC · JPL
312680	2010 MG_{104}	—	February 8, 2007	Mount Lemmon	Mount Lemmon Survey	·	3.7 km	MPC · JPL
312681	2010 NV_{4}	—	July 6, 2010	Catalina	CSS	PHO	1.5 km	MPC · JPL
312682	2010 NW_{4}	—	July 6, 2010	Catalina	CSS	·	3.2 km	MPC · JPL
312683	2010 NH_{5}	—	July 24, 2003	Palomar	NEAT	·	1.4 km	MPC · JPL
312684	2010 NX_{22}	—	September 6, 2004	Siding Spring	SSS	·	4.7 km	MPC · JPL
312685	2010 NM_{30}	—	July 7, 2010	WISE	WISE	·	3.8 km	MPC · JPL
312686	2010 NZ_{39}	—	July 8, 2010	WISE	WISE	·	2.4 km	MPC · JPL
312687	2010 NU_{43}	—	July 9, 2010	WISE	WISE	·	2.6 km	MPC · JPL
312688	2010 NK_{45}	—	April 3, 2008	Mount Lemmon	Mount Lemmon Survey	·	3.1 km	MPC · JPL
312689	2010 ND_{50}	—	August 27, 2005	Palomar	NEAT	·	2.6 km	MPC · JPL
312690	2010 NE_{64}	—	July 11, 2010	WISE	WISE	·	4.6 km	MPC · JPL
312691	2010 NW_{86}	—	July 1, 2010	WISE	WISE	·	2.9 km	MPC · JPL
312692	2010 NA_{97}	—	March 10, 2008	Kitt Peak	Spacewatch	·	2.7 km	MPC · JPL
312693	2010 NU_{110}	—	March 11, 2008	Kitt Peak	Spacewatch	HOF	2.9 km	MPC · JPL
312694	2010 NT_{117}	—	July 5, 2010	Kitt Peak	Spacewatch	·	2.8 km	MPC · JPL
312695	2010 OE_{6}	—	November 3, 2005	Mount Lemmon	Mount Lemmon Survey	·	2.6 km	MPC · JPL
312696	2010 OK_{14}	—	October 1, 2005	Catalina	CSS	NAE	3.5 km	MPC · JPL
312697	2010 OW_{25}	—	August 29, 2001	Palomar	NEAT	·	2.6 km	MPC · JPL
312698	2010 OL_{28}	—	March 6, 2008	Mount Lemmon	Mount Lemmon Survey	·	4.1 km	MPC · JPL
312699	2010 OH_{41}	—	February 19, 2007	Catalina	CSS	ARM	5.2 km	MPC · JPL
312700	2010 OY_{75}	—	July 26, 2010	WISE	WISE	L4	10 km	MPC · JPL

== 312701–312800 ==
back to top

Designation			Discovery			Properties		Ref
Permanent	Provisional	Named after	Date	Site	Discoverer(s)	Category	Diam.	Ref
312701	2010 OS_{84}	—	September 21, 2004	Socorro	LINEAR	·	6.0 km	MPC · JPL
312702	2010 OD_{87}	—	August 30, 1997	Caussols	ODAS	·	3.8 km	MPC · JPL
312703	2010 PT_{2}	—	December 10, 2005	Catalina	CSS	·	4.5 km	MPC · JPL
312704	2010 PV_{10}	—	August 5, 2010	Socorro	LINEAR	EUN	1.6 km	MPC · JPL
312705	2010 PW_{21}	—	November 4, 2004	Kitt Peak	Spacewatch	CYB	4.2 km	MPC · JPL
312706	2010 PM_{25}	—	January 28, 2007	Catalina	CSS	·	7.1 km	MPC · JPL
312707	2010 PV_{25}	—	August 7, 2010	WISE	WISE	L4	20 km	MPC · JPL
312708	2010 PJ_{44}	—	January 23, 2006	Catalina	CSS	CYB	6.3 km	MPC · JPL
312709	2010 PR_{49}	—	December 21, 2006	Mount Lemmon	Mount Lemmon Survey	NAE	4.9 km	MPC · JPL
312710	2010 PE_{65}	—	September 11, 2005	Kitt Peak	Spacewatch	·	2.2 km	MPC · JPL
312711	2010 PO_{71}	—	August 22, 1998	Xinglong	SCAP	·	5.8 km	MPC · JPL
312712	2010 PB_{76}	—	August 10, 2010	Kitt Peak	Spacewatch	KOR	1.7 km	MPC · JPL
312713	2010 QS_{3}	—	August 18, 2010	Purple Mountain	PMO NEO Survey Program	·	1.6 km	MPC · JPL
312714	2010 RR_{3}	—	September 1, 2010	ESA OGS	ESA OGS	·	3.8 km	MPC · JPL
312715	2010 RU_{20}	—	December 15, 2006	Kitt Peak	Spacewatch	·	3.6 km	MPC · JPL
312716	2010 RA_{31}	—	April 28, 2004	Kitt Peak	Spacewatch	L4	10 km	MPC · JPL
312717	2010 RQ_{40}	—	May 16, 2005	Kitt Peak	Spacewatch	·	2.7 km	MPC · JPL
312718	2010 RG_{44}	—	September 6, 2010	Plana	Fratev, F.	·	1.7 km	MPC · JPL
312719	2010 RG_{48}	—	August 27, 2005	Palomar	NEAT	KOR	1.7 km	MPC · JPL
312720	2010 RE_{49}	—	September 4, 2010	Socorro	LINEAR	HYG	3.8 km	MPC · JPL
312721	2010 RC_{50}	—	August 10, 2004	Socorro	LINEAR	THM	3.3 km	MPC · JPL
312722	2010 RY_{55}	—	September 29, 2005	Kitt Peak	Spacewatch	·	2.8 km	MPC · JPL
312723	2010 RF_{65}	—	June 13, 2010	Mount Lemmon	Mount Lemmon Survey	·	3.5 km	MPC · JPL
312724	2010 RU_{73}	—	October 4, 1996	Kitt Peak	Spacewatch	KOR	1.5 km	MPC · JPL
312725	2010 RJ_{82}	—	February 27, 2008	Mount Lemmon	Mount Lemmon Survey	·	2.2 km	MPC · JPL
312726	2010 RW_{105}	—	January 24, 2003	La Silla	A. Boattini, O. Hainaut	HOF	2.7 km	MPC · JPL
312727	2010 RO_{108}	—	September 10, 2010	Mount Lemmon	Mount Lemmon Survey	V	890 m	MPC · JPL
312728	2010 RA_{109}	—	February 17, 2001	Socorro	LINEAR	TIR	3.5 km	MPC · JPL
312729	2010 RV_{118}	—	June 13, 2005	Mount Lemmon	Mount Lemmon Survey	·	2.2 km	MPC · JPL
312730	2010 RZ_{160}	—	January 3, 2003	Kitt Peak	Spacewatch	·	2.5 km	MPC · JPL
312731	2010 SS_{9}	—	September 8, 2004	St. Véran	St. Veran	·	3.6 km	MPC · JPL
312732	2010 SA_{14}	—	October 4, 1999	Kitt Peak	Spacewatch	NYS	1.5 km	MPC · JPL
312733	2010 SC_{21}	—	September 22, 2005	Palomar	NEAT	KOR	1.4 km	MPC · JPL
312734	2010 SH_{27}	—	November 25, 2005	Catalina	CSS	·	3.3 km	MPC · JPL
312735	2010 SL_{36}	—	October 29, 2005	Catalina	CSS	EOS	2.4 km	MPC · JPL
312736	2010 SU_{36}	—	November 3, 2005	Catalina	CSS	EOS	2.1 km	MPC · JPL
312737	2010 SY_{40}	—	January 28, 2007	Kitt Peak	Spacewatch	EOS	2.5 km	MPC · JPL
312738	2010 TZ_{4}	—	October 14, 2001	Socorro	LINEAR	·	2.7 km	MPC · JPL
312739	2010 TA_{25}	—	October 1, 2005	Kitt Peak	Spacewatch	·	2.2 km	MPC · JPL
312740	2010 TP_{26}	—	November 22, 2006	Kitt Peak	Spacewatch	HOF	2.7 km	MPC · JPL
312741	2010 TD_{29}	—	October 9, 2005	Kitt Peak	Spacewatch	·	1.6 km	MPC · JPL
312742	2010 TU_{33}	—	November 25, 2005	Mount Lemmon	Mount Lemmon Survey	THM	2.6 km	MPC · JPL
312743	2010 TL_{34}	—	November 12, 2006	Mount Lemmon	Mount Lemmon Survey	·	1.8 km	MPC · JPL
312744	2010 TM_{35}	—	April 1, 2008	Mount Lemmon	Mount Lemmon Survey	·	2.6 km	MPC · JPL
312745	2010 TM_{41}	—	September 17, 2006	Kitt Peak	Spacewatch	·	1.8 km	MPC · JPL
312746	2010 TR_{52}	—	October 21, 2006	Lulin	LUSS	HOF	2.9 km	MPC · JPL
312747	2010 TR_{57}	—	October 1, 2005	Mount Lemmon	Mount Lemmon Survey	·	3.6 km	MPC · JPL
312748	2010 TZ_{69}	—	May 3, 2008	Kitt Peak	Spacewatch	·	2.9 km	MPC · JPL
312749	2010 TN_{82}	—	August 30, 2005	Kitt Peak	Spacewatch	·	2.1 km	MPC · JPL
312750	2010 TG_{85}	—	November 17, 2006	Mount Lemmon	Mount Lemmon Survey	AGN	1.4 km	MPC · JPL
312751	2010 TG_{92}	—	April 24, 2006	Reedy Creek	J. Broughton	·	920 m	MPC · JPL
312752	2010 TT_{96}	—	March 26, 2003	Kitt Peak	Spacewatch	KOR	1.6 km	MPC · JPL
312753	2010 TA_{97}	—	January 5, 2000	Kitt Peak	Spacewatch	·	1.7 km	MPC · JPL
312754	2010 TG_{98}	—	October 10, 1999	Kitt Peak	Spacewatch	NYS	1.4 km	MPC · JPL
312755	2010 TB_{99}	—	August 22, 2004	Kitt Peak	Spacewatch	·	3.3 km	MPC · JPL
312756	2010 TZ_{104}	—	April 15, 2008	Mount Lemmon	Mount Lemmon Survey	HOF	2.9 km	MPC · JPL
312757	2010 TP_{109}	—	August 28, 2005	Kitt Peak	Spacewatch	KOR	1.6 km	MPC · JPL
312758	2010 TG_{116}	—	July 16, 2004	Cerro Tololo	Deep Ecliptic Survey	·	3.7 km	MPC · JPL
312759	2010 TM_{127}	—	June 17, 2005	Mount Lemmon	Mount Lemmon Survey	·	2.5 km	MPC · JPL
312760	2010 TO_{135}	—	August 23, 2004	Kitt Peak	Spacewatch	·	3.3 km	MPC · JPL
312761	2010 TK_{157}	—	December 13, 2006	Kitt Peak	Spacewatch	KOR	1.5 km	MPC · JPL
312762	2010 TZ_{157}	—	October 5, 2005	Mount Lemmon	Mount Lemmon Survey	KOR	1.4 km	MPC · JPL
312763	2010 TA_{159}	—	March 28, 2008	Mount Lemmon	Mount Lemmon Survey	KOR	1.4 km	MPC · JPL
312764	2010 TP_{178}	—	October 7, 2004	Kitt Peak	Spacewatch	THM	3.2 km	MPC · JPL
312765	2010 TF_{179}	—	October 4, 1999	Kitt Peak	Spacewatch	·	3.1 km	MPC · JPL
312766	2010 UW_{14}	—	May 20, 2005	Mount Lemmon	Mount Lemmon Survey	L4	10 km	MPC · JPL
312767	2010 US_{22}	—	December 25, 2005	Kitt Peak	Spacewatch	THM	2.1 km	MPC · JPL
312768	2010 UL_{30}	—	August 9, 2004	Socorro	LINEAR	·	2.7 km	MPC · JPL
312769	2010 UP_{30}	—	December 7, 2005	Kitt Peak	Spacewatch	HYG	3.9 km	MPC · JPL
312770	2010 UF_{56}	—	September 6, 2008	Mount Lemmon	Mount Lemmon Survey	L4	8.6 km	MPC · JPL
312771	2010 UH_{67}	—	June 11, 2004	Kitt Peak	Spacewatch	MRX	1.3 km	MPC · JPL
312772	2010 UA_{76}	—	December 11, 2002	Kitt Peak	Spacewatch	ADE	2.6 km	MPC · JPL
312773	2010 UW_{82}	—	September 30, 2009	Mount Lemmon	Mount Lemmon Survey	L4	13 km	MPC · JPL
312774	2010 UC_{86}	—	July 7, 2005	Kitt Peak	Spacewatch	(5)	1.6 km	MPC · JPL
312775	2010 UP_{97}	—	March 26, 2003	Kitt Peak	Spacewatch	L4	10 km	MPC · JPL
312776	2010 UZ_{101}	—	November 2, 2006	Mount Lemmon	Mount Lemmon Survey	·	1.9 km	MPC · JPL
312777	2010 VP_{6}	—	September 13, 2004	Palomar	NEAT	·	4.0 km	MPC · JPL
312778	2010 VA_{30}	—	October 21, 2009	Catalina	CSS	L4	16 km	MPC · JPL
312779	2010 VY_{33}	—	July 29, 2009	Kitt Peak	Spacewatch	L4	10 km	MPC · JPL
312780	2010 VR_{34}	—	September 5, 1999	Catalina	CSS	LIX	3.1 km	MPC · JPL
312781	2010 VO_{39}	—	March 2, 2001	Anderson Mesa	LONEOS	·	1.7 km	MPC · JPL
312782	2010 VB_{46}	—	December 16, 2007	Mount Lemmon	Mount Lemmon Survey	L4	12 km	MPC · JPL
312783	2010 VX_{52}	—	March 13, 2008	Kitt Peak	Spacewatch	THM	2.6 km	MPC · JPL
312784	2010 VB_{74}	—	September 2, 2000	Anderson Mesa	LONEOS	·	790 m	MPC · JPL
312785	2010 VH_{90}	—	July 16, 2002	Palomar	NEAT	·	1.5 km	MPC · JPL
312786	2010 VC_{96}	—	October 2, 2009	Mount Lemmon	Mount Lemmon Survey	L4	10 km	MPC · JPL
312787	2010 VA_{114}	—	May 10, 2005	Mount Lemmon	Mount Lemmon Survey	L4	10 km	MPC · JPL
312788	2010 VF_{127}	—	June 29, 1995	Kitt Peak	Spacewatch	L4	11 km	MPC · JPL
312789	2010 VW_{138}	—	July 23, 2003	Palomar	NEAT	·	5.1 km	MPC · JPL
312790	2010 VB_{163}	—	April 8, 2002	Palomar	NEAT	·	4.6 km	MPC · JPL
312791	2010 VT_{164}	—	November 18, 1998	Kitt Peak	M. W. Buie	L4	8.9 km	MPC · JPL
312792	2010 VX_{176}	—	June 22, 2004	Kitt Peak	Spacewatch	·	2.7 km	MPC · JPL
312793	2010 VR_{180}	—	September 4, 2008	Kitt Peak	Spacewatch	L4	9.9 km	MPC · JPL
312794	2010 VM_{195}	—	July 23, 2003	Palomar	NEAT	·	5.4 km	MPC · JPL
312795	2010 WY_{10}	—	April 17, 2001	Apache Point	SDSS	·	5.8 km	MPC · JPL
312796	2010 WQ_{21}	—	September 4, 2008	Kitt Peak	Spacewatch	L4	9.4 km	MPC · JPL
312797	2010 WC_{22}	—	September 27, 2009	Kitt Peak	Spacewatch	L4	8.4 km	MPC · JPL
312798	2010 WC_{27}	—	September 19, 2009	Kitt Peak	Spacewatch	L4	8.0 km	MPC · JPL
312799	2010 WF_{54}	—	June 21, 2007	Mount Lemmon	Mount Lemmon Survey	L4	10 km	MPC · JPL
312800	2010 WM_{64}	—	October 10, 2005	Kitt Peak	Spacewatch	·	3.0 km	MPC · JPL

== 312801–312900 ==
back to top

Designation			Discovery			Properties		Ref
Permanent	Provisional	Named after	Date	Site	Discoverer(s)	Category	Diam.	Ref
312801	2010 WO_{66}	—	September 24, 2008	Mount Lemmon	Mount Lemmon Survey	L4	8.9 km	MPC · JPL
312802	2010 XM_{5}	—	January 5, 2000	Socorro	LINEAR	L4	21 km	MPC · JPL
312803	2010 XD_{71}	—	September 13, 2007	Mount Lemmon	Mount Lemmon Survey	L4	10 km	MPC · JPL
312804	2010 XQ_{79}	—	August 22, 1995	Kitt Peak	Spacewatch	L4	10 km	MPC · JPL
312805	2010 XN_{80}	—	April 11, 2003	Kitt Peak	Spacewatch	L4	10 km	MPC · JPL
312806	2010 XG_{85}	—	January 2, 2001	Kitt Peak	Spacewatch	L4	10 km	MPC · JPL
312807	2010 XM_{87}	—	October 4, 1996	Kitt Peak	Spacewatch	L4	10 km	MPC · JPL
312808	2010 YS_{1}	—	September 4, 2003	Kitt Peak	Spacewatch	·	4.2 km	MPC · JPL
312809	2011 AJ_{22}	—	March 3, 2006	Anderson Mesa	LONEOS	·	4.2 km	MPC · JPL
312810	2011 BZ_{125}	—	July 19, 2004	Anderson Mesa	LONEOS	·	2.0 km	MPC · JPL
312811	2011 FP_{88}	—	September 17, 1995	Kitt Peak	Spacewatch	·	3.1 km	MPC · JPL
312812	2011 GH	—	January 4, 2006	Mount Lemmon	Mount Lemmon Survey	·	1.5 km	MPC · JPL
312813	2011 KL_{30}	—	April 27, 2001	Socorro	LINEAR	·	1.0 km	MPC · JPL
312814	2011 LS_{13}	—	February 13, 2002	Apache Point	SDSS	·	1.5 km	MPC · JPL
312815	2011 OR_{19}	—	August 31, 2000	Socorro	LINEAR	CLA	2.0 km	MPC · JPL
312816	2011 OE_{48}	—	December 6, 2002	Socorro	LINEAR	·	4.1 km	MPC · JPL
312817	2011 QT_{6}	—	December 1, 2005	Kitt Peak	Spacewatch	·	810 m	MPC · JPL
312818	2011 QX_{67}	—	May 25, 2007	Mount Lemmon	Mount Lemmon Survey	·	1.5 km	MPC · JPL
312819	2011 QO_{92}	—	October 15, 2001	Kitt Peak	Spacewatch	·	2.7 km	MPC · JPL
312820	2011 SG_{31}	—	December 27, 2005	Kitt Peak	Spacewatch	3:2	5.7 km	MPC · JPL
312821	2011 SF_{43}	—	October 5, 1997	Kitt Peak	Spacewatch	AGN	1.5 km	MPC · JPL
312822	2011 SO_{91}	—	April 22, 2004	Kitt Peak	Spacewatch	·	2.8 km	MPC · JPL
312823	2011 SB_{113}	—	January 19, 2001	Haleakala	NEAT	(194)	2.2 km	MPC · JPL
312824	2011 SN_{123}	—	March 11, 2002	Palomar	NEAT	·	3.9 km	MPC · JPL
312825	2011 SH_{135}	—	October 21, 1995	Kitt Peak	Spacewatch	EOS	2.0 km	MPC · JPL
312826	2011 SD_{142}	—	January 19, 2004	Kitt Peak	Spacewatch	·	2.0 km	MPC · JPL
312827	2011 SW_{166}	—	April 8, 2002	Kitt Peak	Spacewatch	·	1.7 km	MPC · JPL
312828	2011 SW_{172}	—	October 1, 2000	Kitt Peak	Spacewatch	·	920 m	MPC · JPL
312829	2011 SW_{183}	—	July 4, 2005	Palomar	NEAT	HYG	3.4 km	MPC · JPL
312830	2011 SB_{241}	—	March 23, 2003	Kitt Peak	Spacewatch	V	760 m	MPC · JPL
312831	2011 SU_{247}	—	December 4, 2003	Socorro	LINEAR	·	1.8 km	MPC · JPL
312832	2011 SN_{257}	—	January 1, 2009	Kitt Peak	Spacewatch	V	620 m	MPC · JPL
312833	2011 TO_{9}	—	December 18, 2001	Socorro	LINEAR	·	3.6 km	MPC · JPL
312834	2011 TS_{13}	—	March 15, 2004	Kitt Peak	Spacewatch	AGN	1.2 km	MPC · JPL
312835	2011 UP_{8}	—	February 16, 2002	Palomar	NEAT	·	1.6 km	MPC · JPL
312836	2011 UE_{13}	—	October 10, 2004	Kitt Peak	Spacewatch	·	940 m	MPC · JPL
312837	2011 UC_{16}	—	April 16, 2004	Kitt Peak	Spacewatch	KOR	1.7 km	MPC · JPL
312838	2011 UL_{17}	—	April 8, 2002	Palomar	NEAT	·	3.7 km	MPC · JPL
312839	2011 UL_{25}	—	October 22, 2006	Mount Lemmon	Mount Lemmon Survey	·	3.5 km	MPC · JPL
312840	2011 UW_{37}	—	May 27, 2003	Kitt Peak	Spacewatch	·	4.9 km	MPC · JPL
312841	2011 UO_{49}	—	September 28, 2000	Kitt Peak	Spacewatch	MAS	790 m	MPC · JPL
312842	2011 UW_{52}	—	April 23, 2004	Campo Imperatore	CINEOS	EOS	2.2 km	MPC · JPL
312843	2011 UA_{55}	—	November 17, 1995	Kitt Peak	Spacewatch	EOS	2.7 km	MPC · JPL
312844	2011 UM_{55}	—	July 18, 2006	Siding Spring	SSS	·	2.2 km	MPC · JPL
312845	2011 UQ_{55}	—	August 1, 2000	Socorro	LINEAR	·	950 m	MPC · JPL
312846	2011 UQ_{61}	—	March 11, 2005	Mount Lemmon	Mount Lemmon Survey	·	1.2 km	MPC · JPL
312847	2011 UA_{78}	—	March 29, 2003	Anderson Mesa	LONEOS	·	4.3 km	MPC · JPL
312848	2011 UE_{78}	—	November 19, 2006	Kitt Peak	Spacewatch	EOS	2.5 km	MPC · JPL
312849	2011 UY_{81}	—	January 15, 2004	Kitt Peak	Spacewatch	·	1.8 km	MPC · JPL
312850	2011 UQ_{84}	—	September 1, 2005	Palomar	NEAT	·	5.8 km	MPC · JPL
312851	2011 UZ_{84}	—	October 15, 2002	Palomar	NEAT	·	1.8 km	MPC · JPL
312852	2011 UA_{85}	—	December 18, 2004	Mount Lemmon	Mount Lemmon Survey	·	1.3 km	MPC · JPL
312853	2011 UM_{86}	—	September 23, 2000	Socorro	LINEAR	·	2.9 km	MPC · JPL
312854	2011 UR_{86}	—	July 28, 2005	Palomar	NEAT	·	1.9 km	MPC · JPL
312855	2011 UO_{87}	—	September 10, 2007	Catalina	CSS	·	940 m	MPC · JPL
312856	2011 UY_{87}	—	November 5, 2007	Mount Lemmon	Mount Lemmon Survey	·	1.6 km	MPC · JPL
312857	2011 UK_{88}	—	April 11, 2005	Mount Lemmon	Mount Lemmon Survey	·	1.7 km	MPC · JPL
312858	2011 UK_{89}	—	March 23, 2003	Kitt Peak	Spacewatch	·	650 m	MPC · JPL
312859	2011 UL_{113}	—	December 14, 2004	Socorro	LINEAR	·	1.3 km	MPC · JPL
312860	2011 UB_{125}	—	March 26, 2003	Kitt Peak	Spacewatch	EOS	2.0 km	MPC · JPL
312861 Wolfslehner	2011 UO_{126}	Wolfslehner	January 8, 2008	Gaisberg	Gierlinger, R.	·	1.8 km	MPC · JPL
312862	2011 UP_{141}	—	December 5, 2007	Kitt Peak	Spacewatch	·	1.8 km	MPC · JPL
312863	2011 UX_{141}	—	October 16, 1977	Palomar	C. J. van Houten, I. van Houten-Groeneveld, T. Gehrels	·	1.7 km	MPC · JPL
312864	2011 US_{145}	—	September 19, 2001	Socorro	LINEAR	·	730 m	MPC · JPL
312865	2011 UC_{152}	—	March 18, 2004	Socorro	LINEAR	HOF	3.5 km	MPC · JPL
312866	2011 UY_{152}	—	May 1, 2003	Kitt Peak	Spacewatch	·	3.1 km	MPC · JPL
312867	2011 UP_{154}	—	January 13, 2005	Kitt Peak	Spacewatch	·	1.5 km	MPC · JPL
312868	2011 UQ_{154}	—	December 2, 2004	Socorro	LINEAR	·	960 m	MPC · JPL
312869	2011 UL_{160}	—	April 2, 2005	Kitt Peak	Spacewatch	·	2.5 km	MPC · JPL
312870	2011 UA_{161}	—	October 20, 2001	Palomar	NEAT	·	2.3 km	MPC · JPL
312871	2011 UL_{161}	—	August 29, 2005	Kitt Peak	Spacewatch	·	2.5 km	MPC · JPL
312872	2011 UU_{163}	—	November 9, 2004	Catalina	CSS	·	720 m	MPC · JPL
312873	2011 UD_{164}	—	October 16, 1977	Palomar	C. J. van Houten, I. van Houten-Groeneveld, T. Gehrels	(5)	1.4 km	MPC · JPL
312874	2011 UM_{165}	—	October 7, 2004	Palomar	NEAT	·	1.2 km	MPC · JPL
312875	2011 UJ_{174}	—	October 31, 2002	Socorro	LINEAR	·	2.1 km	MPC · JPL
312876	2011 UY_{177}	—	September 30, 2005	Anderson Mesa	LONEOS	·	3.5 km	MPC · JPL
312877	2011 UY_{179}	—	September 15, 1993	La Silla	E. W. Elst	·	1.2 km	MPC · JPL
312878	2011 UA_{180}	—	October 10, 1999	Socorro	LINEAR	·	4.5 km	MPC · JPL
312879	2011 UC_{192}	—	December 30, 2007	Mount Lemmon	Mount Lemmon Survey	·	1.8 km	MPC · JPL
312880	2011 UL_{196}	—	March 10, 2002	Kitt Peak	Spacewatch	·	3.5 km	MPC · JPL
312881	2011 UU_{199}	—	August 19, 2006	Kitt Peak	Spacewatch	·	1.6 km	MPC · JPL
312882	2011 UV_{202}	—	April 8, 2008	Catalina	CSS	·	9.2 km	MPC · JPL
312883	2011 UW_{203}	—	December 20, 2006	Palomar	NEAT	·	4.2 km	MPC · JPL
312884	2011 UL_{242}	—	July 29, 2002	Palomar	NEAT	·	1.3 km	MPC · JPL
312885	2011 UO_{251}	—	October 3, 2006	Mount Lemmon	Mount Lemmon Survey	HOF	3.8 km	MPC · JPL
312886	2011 UK_{252}	—	May 27, 2000	Socorro	LINEAR	·	3.3 km	MPC · JPL
312887	2011 US_{253}	—	December 19, 2000	Socorro	LINEAR	H	800 m	MPC · JPL
312888	2011 UN_{254}	—	April 2, 2000	Kitt Peak	Spacewatch	·	2.0 km	MPC · JPL
312889	2011 UV_{262}	—	September 19, 2006	Kitt Peak	Spacewatch	·	2.0 km	MPC · JPL
312890	2011 UL_{263}	—	December 18, 2007	Mount Lemmon	Mount Lemmon Survey	·	2.2 km	MPC · JPL
312891	2011 UB_{266}	—	May 28, 2000	Kitt Peak	Spacewatch	·	2.6 km	MPC · JPL
312892	2011 UE_{268}	—	November 27, 2000	Socorro	LINEAR	HYG	3.3 km	MPC · JPL
312893	2011 UE_{271}	—	April 24, 2003	Kitt Peak	Spacewatch	·	3.5 km	MPC · JPL
312894	2011 UY_{271}	—	December 14, 2003	Kitt Peak	Spacewatch	(5)	1.9 km	MPC · JPL
312895	2011 UB_{281}	—	April 19, 1998	Kitt Peak	Spacewatch	·	3.2 km	MPC · JPL
312896	2011 UG_{281}	—	October 31, 1997	Socorro	LINEAR	·	1.2 km	MPC · JPL
312897	2011 UH_{285}	—	May 13, 2005	Mount Lemmon	Mount Lemmon Survey	·	2.7 km	MPC · JPL
312898	2011 UT_{285}	—	February 16, 2004	Kitt Peak	Spacewatch	(21344)	1.8 km	MPC · JPL
312899	2011 US_{296}	—	April 22, 2004	Socorro	LINEAR	·	4.8 km	MPC · JPL
312900	2011 UM_{297}	—	September 10, 2007	Kitt Peak	Spacewatch	·	1.4 km	MPC · JPL

== 312901–313000 ==
back to top

Designation			Discovery			Properties		Ref
Permanent	Provisional	Named after	Date	Site	Discoverer(s)	Category	Diam.	Ref
312901	2011 UH_{300}	—	February 5, 2000	Kitt Peak	Spacewatch	(5)	1.1 km	MPC · JPL
312902	2011 UL_{300}	—	October 1, 2005	Catalina	CSS	EMA	4.0 km	MPC · JPL
312903	2011 UQ_{300}	—	January 7, 2003	Socorro	LINEAR	(32418)	2.2 km	MPC · JPL
312904	2011 UO_{309}	—	September 30, 2006	Mount Lemmon	Mount Lemmon Survey	KOR	1.6 km	MPC · JPL
312905	2011 UH_{317}	—	August 29, 2006	Catalina	CSS	·	2.4 km	MPC · JPL
312906	2011 UC_{319}	—	June 20, 1998	Kitt Peak	Spacewatch	EOS	2.5 km	MPC · JPL
312907	2011 UZ_{327}	—	September 24, 1995	Kitt Peak	Spacewatch	fast	1.9 km	MPC · JPL
312908	2011 UA_{332}	—	December 5, 2002	Socorro	LINEAR	·	2.8 km	MPC · JPL
312909	2011 UQ_{334}	—	August 3, 2000	Kitt Peak	Spacewatch	NYS	1.1 km	MPC · JPL
312910	2011 UT_{338}	—	June 9, 2007	Catalina	CSS	·	1.2 km	MPC · JPL
312911	2011 UC_{363}	—	December 15, 2006	Kitt Peak	Spacewatch	THM	2.0 km	MPC · JPL
312912	2011 UZ_{400}	—	November 18, 1995	Kitt Peak	Spacewatch	·	2.7 km	MPC · JPL
312913	2011 VV_{4}	—	October 29, 2005	Mount Lemmon	Mount Lemmon Survey	·	2.9 km	MPC · JPL
312914	2011 VU_{12}	—	January 14, 2002	Palomar	NEAT	EOS	2.8 km	MPC · JPL
312915	2011 VG_{14}	—	March 18, 2004	Kitt Peak	Spacewatch	(12739)	1.9 km	MPC · JPL
312916	2011 VU_{14}	—	September 20, 2001	Socorro	LINEAR	·	2.3 km	MPC · JPL
312917	2011 WH_{1}	—	September 30, 2005	Mount Lemmon	Mount Lemmon Survey	EOS	2.1 km	MPC · JPL
312918	2011 WV_{1}	—	December 22, 1998	Kitt Peak	Spacewatch	·	2.6 km	MPC · JPL
312919	2011 WU_{9}	—	February 12, 2004	Kitt Peak	Spacewatch	·	1.9 km	MPC · JPL
312920	2011 WD_{14}	—	September 26, 1998	Socorro	LINEAR	·	1.4 km	MPC · JPL
312921	2011 WF_{16}	—	March 26, 2000	Anderson Mesa	LONEOS	·	850 m	MPC · JPL
312922	2011 WL_{17}	—	December 18, 1995	Kitt Peak	Spacewatch	·	1.6 km	MPC · JPL
312923	2011 WA_{32}	—	February 13, 2002	Kitt Peak	Spacewatch	·	3.6 km	MPC · JPL
312924	2011 WN_{35}	—	October 2, 2005	Siding Spring	SSS	·	3.7 km	MPC · JPL
312925	2011 WX_{39}	—	May 9, 2005	Catalina	CSS	·	2.8 km	MPC · JPL
312926	2011 WN_{55}	—	April 24, 2006	Kitt Peak	Spacewatch	·	1.7 km	MPC · JPL
312927	2011 WM_{58}	—	April 7, 2005	Mount Lemmon	Mount Lemmon Survey	·	1.8 km	MPC · JPL
312928	2011 WT_{59}	—	January 29, 1998	Kitt Peak	Spacewatch	KOR	1.6 km	MPC · JPL
312929	2011 WM_{60}	—	December 27, 2006	Mount Lemmon	Mount Lemmon Survey	HYG	2.4 km	MPC · JPL
312930	2011 WN_{61}	—	March 11, 2005	Mount Lemmon	Mount Lemmon Survey	(5)	1.5 km	MPC · JPL
312931	2011 WY_{66}	—	July 31, 2006	Siding Spring	SSS	·	1.9 km	MPC · JPL
312932	2011 WV_{69}	—	August 28, 2003	Palomar	NEAT	·	1.6 km	MPC · JPL
312933	2011 WD_{80}	—	February 7, 1999	Kitt Peak	Spacewatch	AST	1.9 km	MPC · JPL
312934	2011 WS_{83}	—	November 27, 2000	Socorro	LINEAR	·	1.2 km	MPC · JPL
312935	5042 T-3	—	October 16, 1977	Palomar	C. J. van Houten, I. van Houten-Groeneveld, T. Gehrels	·	1.4 km	MPC · JPL
312936	1979 MT_{3}	—	June 25, 1979	Siding Spring	E. F. Helin, S. J. Bus	·	1.3 km	MPC · JPL
312937	1993 RU_{14}	—	September 15, 1993	La Silla	E. W. Elst	BRG	2.2 km	MPC · JPL
312938	1994 AY_{6}	—	January 7, 1994	Kitt Peak	Spacewatch	·	1.8 km	MPC · JPL
312939	1994 SW_{12}	—	September 29, 1994	Kitt Peak	Spacewatch	·	3.7 km	MPC · JPL
312940	1994 UC_{10}	—	October 28, 1994	Kitt Peak	Spacewatch	·	2.2 km	MPC · JPL
312941	1995 BJ_{12}	—	January 31, 1995	Kitt Peak	Spacewatch	·	800 m	MPC · JPL
312942	1995 EK_{1}	—	March 7, 1995	Oizumi	T. Kobayashi	APO +1km	1.2 km	MPC · JPL
312943	1995 EQ_{5}	—	March 2, 1995	Kitt Peak	Spacewatch	·	1.9 km	MPC · JPL
312944	1995 FK_{8}	—	March 26, 1995	Kitt Peak	Spacewatch	·	1.7 km	MPC · JPL
312945	1995 FE_{19}	—	March 29, 1995	Kitt Peak	Spacewatch	·	1.4 km	MPC · JPL
312946	1995 SN_{35}	—	September 23, 1995	Kitt Peak	Spacewatch	·	3.6 km	MPC · JPL
312947	1995 SC_{46}	—	September 26, 1995	Kitt Peak	Spacewatch	MAS	1.1 km	MPC · JPL
312948	1995 SF_{80}	—	September 26, 1995	Kitt Peak	Spacewatch	L4	15 km	MPC · JPL
312949	1995 UG_{82}	—	October 28, 1995	Kitt Peak	Spacewatch	·	1.4 km	MPC · JPL
312950	1995 WP_{11}	—	November 16, 1995	Kitt Peak	Spacewatch	·	1.4 km	MPC · JPL
312951	1995 YQ_{11}	—	December 18, 1995	Kitt Peak	Spacewatch	·	3.5 km	MPC · JPL
312952	1996 AN_{6}	—	January 12, 1996	Kitt Peak	Spacewatch	·	2.8 km	MPC · JPL
312953	1996 BM_{10}	—	January 21, 1996	Kitt Peak	Spacewatch	EUN	1.9 km	MPC · JPL
312954	1996 GF_{13}	—	April 11, 1996	Kitt Peak	Spacewatch	(5)	1.6 km	MPC · JPL
312955	1996 RB_{19}	—	September 15, 1996	Kitt Peak	Spacewatch	L4	8.3 km	MPC · JPL
312956	1997 CZ_{3}	—	February 2, 1997	Kitt Peak	Spacewatch	APO	450 m	MPC · JPL
312957	1997 JQ_{9}	—	May 6, 1997	Kitt Peak	Spacewatch	·	2.8 km	MPC · JPL
312958	1997 QP_{2}	—	August 30, 1997	Haleakala	NEAT	·	980 m	MPC · JPL
312959	1997 SH_{9}	—	September 27, 1997	Kitt Peak	Spacewatch	·	2.0 km	MPC · JPL
312960	1997 SP_{11}	—	September 27, 1997	Kitt Peak	Spacewatch	HNS	1.2 km	MPC · JPL
312961	1997 SG_{30}	—	September 30, 1997	Kitt Peak	Spacewatch	L4	9.9 km	MPC · JPL
312962	1997 SM_{30}	—	September 30, 1997	Kitt Peak	Spacewatch	L4	7.7 km	MPC · JPL
312963	1997 YO_{8}	—	December 21, 1997	Kitt Peak	Spacewatch	·	2.4 km	MPC · JPL
312964	1998 DU_{25}	—	February 23, 1998	Kitt Peak	Spacewatch	NYS	1.3 km	MPC · JPL
312965	1998 EW_{9}	—	March 5, 1998	Xinglong	SCAP	·	910 m	MPC · JPL
312966	1998 HE_{5}	—	April 22, 1998	Kitt Peak	Spacewatch	·	1.3 km	MPC · JPL
312967	1998 QW_{28}	—	August 23, 1998	Xinglong	SCAP	·	3.0 km	MPC · JPL
312968	1998 QS_{97}	—	August 24, 1998	Socorro	LINEAR	EUP	5.3 km	MPC · JPL
312969	1998 SK_{34}	—	September 26, 1998	Socorro	LINEAR	·	1.5 km	MPC · JPL
312970	1998 SZ_{34}	—	September 26, 1998	Socorro	LINEAR	·	1.3 km	MPC · JPL
312971	1998 VE_{34}	—	November 15, 1998	Gekko	T. Kagawa	(5)	1.5 km	MPC · JPL
312972	1998 WO	—	November 17, 1998	Cocoa	I. P. Griffin	·	3.1 km	MPC · JPL
312973	1999 BX_{10}	—	January 19, 1999	Caussols	ODAS	JUN	1.2 km	MPC · JPL
312974	1999 CU_{8}	—	February 10, 1999	Socorro	LINEAR	·	970 m	MPC · JPL
312975	1999 CZ_{70}	—	February 12, 1999	Socorro	LINEAR	·	2.2 km	MPC · JPL
312976	1999 CN_{159}	—	February 10, 1999	Kitt Peak	Spacewatch	(1547)	2.8 km	MPC · JPL
312977	1999 FO_{73}	—	March 20, 1999	Apache Point	SDSS	AGN	1.3 km	MPC · JPL
312978	1999 JG_{29}	—	May 10, 1999	Socorro	LINEAR	T_{j} (2.9) · CYB	6.0 km	MPC · JPL
312979	1999 KT_{4}	—	May 18, 1999	Socorro	LINEAR	·	770 m	MPC · JPL
312980	1999 RK_{60}	—	September 7, 1999	Socorro	LINEAR	·	2.5 km	MPC · JPL
312981	1999 RV_{123}	—	September 13, 1999	Kitt Peak	Spacewatch	·	2.3 km	MPC · JPL
312982	1999 RC_{206}	—	September 8, 1999	Socorro	LINEAR	·	2.1 km	MPC · JPL
312983	1999 RA_{236}	—	September 8, 1999	Catalina	CSS	·	3.1 km	MPC · JPL
312984	1999 SH_{21}	—	September 30, 1999	Kitt Peak	Spacewatch	·	1.3 km	MPC · JPL
312985	1999 TF_{45}	—	October 3, 1999	Kitt Peak	Spacewatch	EOS	2.5 km	MPC · JPL
312986	1999 TU_{47}	—	October 4, 1999	Kitt Peak	Spacewatch	·	1.0 km	MPC · JPL
312987	1999 TC_{63}	—	October 7, 1999	Kitt Peak	Spacewatch	EOS	2.7 km	MPC · JPL
312988	1999 TA_{67}	—	October 8, 1999	Kitt Peak	Spacewatch	·	1.2 km	MPC · JPL
312989	1999 TV_{72}	—	October 9, 1999	Kitt Peak	Spacewatch	HYG	3.8 km	MPC · JPL
312990	1999 TQ_{77}	—	October 10, 1999	Kitt Peak	Spacewatch	MAS	930 m	MPC · JPL
312991	1999 TZ_{126}	—	October 15, 1999	Socorro	LINEAR	NYS	1.8 km	MPC · JPL
312992	1999 TU_{156}	—	October 9, 1999	Socorro	LINEAR	·	1.4 km	MPC · JPL
312993	1999 TH_{170}	—	October 10, 1999	Socorro	LINEAR	·	1.5 km	MPC · JPL
312994	1999 TG_{175}	—	October 10, 1999	Socorro	LINEAR	·	1.4 km	MPC · JPL
312995	1999 TA_{191}	—	October 12, 1999	Socorro	LINEAR	EOS	2.7 km	MPC · JPL
312996	1999 TJ_{237}	—	October 4, 1999	Kitt Peak	Spacewatch	·	1.2 km	MPC · JPL
312997	1999 TG_{245}	—	October 7, 1999	Catalina	CSS	NYS	1.4 km	MPC · JPL
312998	1999 TL_{250}	—	October 9, 1999	Catalina	CSS	EOS	2.7 km	MPC · JPL
312999	1999 TU_{255}	—	October 9, 1999	Kitt Peak	Spacewatch	·	1.3 km	MPC · JPL
313000	1999 TV_{262}	—	October 15, 1999	Kitt Peak	Spacewatch	·	3.4 km	MPC · JPL

back to top

== Meaning of names ==
As minor planet discoveries are confirmed, they are given a permanent number by the IAU's Minor Planet Center (MPC), and the discoverers can then submit names for them, following the IAU's naming conventions. The list below concerns those minor planets in the specified number-range that have received names, and explains the meanings of those names.

Official naming citations of newly named small Solar System bodies are approved and published in a bulletin by IAU's Working Group for Small Bodies Nomenclature (WGSBN). Before May 2021, citations were published in MPC's Minor Planet Circulars for many decades. Recent citations can also be found on the JPL Small-Body Database (SBDB). Until his death in 2016, German astronomer Lutz D. Schmadel compiled these citations into the Dictionary of Minor Planet Names (DMP) and regularly updated the collection.

Based on Paul Herget's The Names of the Minor Planets, Schmadel also researched the unclear origin of numerous asteroids, most of which had been named prior to World War II. This article incorporates text from this source, which is in the public domain: SBDB New namings may only be added to this list below after official publication as the preannouncement of names is condemned. The WGSBN publishes a comprehensive guideline for the naming rules of non-cometary small Solar System bodies.

Named minor planet	Provisional	This minor planet was named for...	Ref · Catalog
312001 Siobhánhaughey	2007 PK_{2}	Siobhán Haughey (born 1997), Hong Kong swimmer specialising in freestyle and individual medley events.	IAU · 312001
312627 Brigitteyagüe	2009 TS_{26}	Brigitte Yagüe Enrique (born 1981), Spanish athlete who competed in taekwondo and won the silver medal at the 2012 London Olympics.	IAU · 312627
312676 Posner	2010 MF_{36}	German-born space scientist Arik Posner (b. 1968) created ReleASE (Relativistic Electron Alert System for Exploration). It warns astronauts of solar radiation events. He also designed the first dedicated radiation detector placed on another planet, Mars, on the NASA Curiosity rover. With it, on the way to Mars, Arik discovered the Hohmann-Parker effect.	IAU · 312676
312861 Wolfslehner	2011 UO_{126}	Wilhelm Wolfslehner (b. 1961) is an Austrian technology enthusiast and collector dedicated to preserving historical film equipment, jukeboxes and other technical artifacts through a private museum project.	IAU · 312861
