= (9992) 1997 TG19 =

Asteroid

(9992) 1997 TG_{19}
Discovery
- Discovered by: T. Kagawa; T. Urata
- Discovery site: Gekko Obs.
- Discovery date: 8 October 1997

Designations
- Alternative designations: 1974 HC_{1} · 1980 BD
- Minor planet category: Mars-crosser

Orbital characteristics
- Epoch 21 November 2025 (JD 2461000.5)
- Uncertainty parameter 0
- Observation arc: 51.31 yr (18,740 days)
- Aphelion: 2.8074 AU
- Perihelion: 1.5334 AU
- Semi-major axis: 2.1704 AU
- Eccentricity: 0.2935
- Orbital period (sidereal): 3.20 yr (1,169 days)
- Mean anomaly: 358.67°
- Mean motion: 0° 18^{m} 29.52^{s} / day
- Inclination: 2.5918°
- Longitude of ascending node: 42.945°
- Argument of perihelion: 234.89°

Physical characteristics
- Dimensions: 3.07 km (derived); 4.75±0.36 km
- Synodic rotation period: 5.7300±0.0016 h 5.7402±0.0005 h 5.7408±0.0009 h (Note: Pravec (2006) web: rotation period 5.7408±0.0009 hours with a brightness amplitude of 0.0009 mag. Summary figures at Collaborative Asteroid Lightcurve Link (CALL) for (9992) and Pravec − Results from Asteroid Photometry Project at Ondřejov Observatory)
- Geometric albedo: 0.137±0.022; 0.20 (assumed)
- Spectral type: S
- Absolute magnitude (H): 14.40 · 14.48±0.08 (R) · 14.5 · 14.663±0.004 (R) · 14.76±0.26 · 14.97±0.094

(9992) 1997 TG_{19} is a stony asteroid and eccentric Mars-crosser, approximately 4 kilometers in diameter. It was discovered on 8 October 1997, by Japanese astronomers Tetsuo Kagawa and Takeshi Urata at Gekko Observatory near Shizuoka, Japan.

== Orbit and classification ==
Orbit of (9992) 1997 TG_{19} (blue), compared to the inner planets and Jupiter (outermost)

The stony S-type asteroid orbits the Sun at a distance of 1.5–2.8 AU once every 3 years and 2 months (1,169 days). Its orbit has an eccentricity of 0.29 and an inclination of 3° with respect to the ecliptic. The first used observation was made at the Cerro El Roble Station in 1974, extending the asteroid's observation arc by 23 years prior to its discovery.

== Physical characteristics ==
=== Lightcurves ===
Between 2006 and 2013, three rotational lightcurves for this asteroid were obtained from photometric observations made at the Hunters Hill Observatory, Australia, the Ondřejov Observatory, Czech Republic, and the U.S. Palomar Transient Factory, California. They gave a well-defined, concurring rotation period of 5.7402±0.0005 hours (best result) with a brightness amplitude of 0.42, 0.40 and 0.27 in magnitude, respectively (U=3/3/2).

=== Diameter and albedo ===
According to the survey carried out by the Japanese Akari satellite, the asteroid's surface has an albedo of 0.13 and a diameter of 4.75 kilometers. The Collaborative Asteroid Lightcurve Link assumes a standard albedo for stony asteroids of 0.20 and calculates a diameter of 3.1 kilometers, as the higher the body's albedo (reflectivity), the shorter its diameter, at a constant absolute magnitude (brightness).

== Numbering and naming ==
This minor planet was numbered by the Minor Planet Center on 2 February 1999. As of 2026, it has not been named.
