= Tetsuo Kagawa =

Japanese astronomer

Minor planets discovered: 115
see § List of discovered minor planets

Tetsuo Kagawa (香川 哲男, Kagawa Tetsuo, born 1969) is a Japanese astronomer, staff member at the Gekko Observatory and discoverer of asteroids. He is credited by the Minor Planet Center with the discovery of 115 minor planets between 1997 and 2000.

The outer main-belt asteroid 6665 Kagawa was named in his honor on 6 January 2003 (M.P.C. 47295).

== List of discovered minor planets ==
9123 Yoshiko	March 24, 1998
(9992) 1997 TG19^{[1]}	October 8, 1997
10227 Izanami^{[1]}	November 4, 1997
(10393) 1997 RF_{8}^{[1]}	September 4, 1997
10619 Ninigi^{[1]}	November 27, 1997
(10899) 1997 WN_{13}^{[1]}	November 24, 1997
(11153) 1997 YB_{10}^{[1]}	December 25, 1997
(11362) 1998 EN_{9}	March 6, 1998
(11403) 1999 BW	January 16, 1999
(11676) 1998 CQ_{2}	February 6, 1998
(13791) 1998 VC	November 1, 1998
(14205) 1999 BC_{4}	January 18, 1999
(14216) 1999 VW_{1}	November 4, 1999
(14547) 1997 TF_{19}^{[1]}	November 4, 1999
(14982) 1997 TH_{19}^{[1]}	October 8, 1997
(15024) 1998 TB	October 2, 1998
(15401) 1997 VE_{4}^{[1]}	November 4, 1997
(16981) 1999 AU_{7}	November 4, 1997
17746 Haigha^{[1]}	January 30, 1998
(18641) 1998 EG_{10}	March 8, 1998
(19371) 1997 YP_{11}^{[1]}	December 27, 1997
(19621) 1999 RE_{1}	September 4, 1999
(20263) 1998 FF_{16}	March 25, 1998
(21982) 1999 XL_{8}	December 4, 1999
(22762) 1998 YM_{12}	December 27, 1998

(24195) 1999 XD_{36}	December 6, 1999
(25236) 1998 UT_{6}	October 18, 1998
(25249) 1998 UV_{22}	October 31, 1998
(25261) 1998 VX_{5}	November 11, 1998
(25385) 1999 UC_{3}	October 20, 1999
(25446) 1999 XF_{2}	December 4, 1999
(26330) 1998 WN_{5}	November 20, 1998
(26967) 1997 RZ_{7}^{[1]}	September 4, 1997
(26974) 1997 TJ_{19}^{[1]}	October 8, 1997
(28006) 1997 XM_{5}^{[1]}	December 3, 1997
(28215) 1998 YE_{1}	December 16, 1998
(29635) 1998 VP_{5}	November 9, 1998
(29721) 1999 AC_{21}	January 13, 1999
(29733) 1999 BA_{4}	January 18, 1999
(30104) 2000 FA_{3}	March 27, 2000
(31119) 1997 RP_{1}^{[1]}	September 3, 2000
(31222) 1998 BD_{30}^{[1]}	January 26, 1998
(31353) 1998 TE	October 2, 1998
(31386) 1998 YG_{1}	December 16, 1998
(31607) 1999 GQ_{5}	April 15, 1999
(33356) 1999 AM_{3}	January 9, 1999
(33378) 1999 CE_{14}	February 13, 1999
(35395) 1997 XM_{10}^{[1]}	December 4, 1997
(35475) 1998 EP_{9}	March 6, 1998
(38087) 1999 JN	May 6, 1999

(39975) 1998 HY_{6}	April 20, 1998
(40411) 1999 RM_{3}	September 6, 1999
(40757) 1999 TS_{8}	October 5, 1999
(40758) 1999 TT_{8}	October 5, 1999
(41041) 1999 VV_{1}	November 4, 1999
(44448) 1998 UU_{22}	October 31, 1998
(44477) 1998 WL_{5}	November 20, 1998
(44553) 1999 CH_{5}	February 12, 1999
(45070) 1999 XA_{36}	December 6, 1999
(45262) 2000 AG_{2}	January 3, 2000
(47028) 1998 VG_{31}	November 12, 1998
(47222) 1999 VR_{8}	November 8, 1999
(49267) 1998 UU_{6}	October 18, 1998
(49299) 1998 VU_{5}	November 11, 1998
(49301) 1998 VD_{6}	November 11, 1998
(49342) 1998 WE_{3}	November 18, 1998
(49434) 1998 YB_{1}	December 16, 1998
(49435) 1998 YH_{1}	December 16, 1998
(49437) 1998 YY_{3}	December 17, 1998
(49444) 1998 YO_{7}	December 22, 1998
(49498) 1999 CO_{5}	February 12, 1999
(49706) 1999 VB_{21}	November 10, 1999
(49862) 1999 XC_{104}	December 9, 1999
(49988) 2000 AE_{5}	January 3, 2000
(50309) 2000 CO_{40}	February 4, 2000

(53027) 1998 WM_{5}	November 20, 1998
(53120) 1999 AE_{21}	January 13, 1999
(53554) 2000 CH_{2}	February 2, 2000
(56069) 1998 YL_{5}	December 17, 1998
(56080) 1999 AN_{3}	January 9, 1999
(56217) 1999 HH_{3}	April 25, 1999
(59120) 1998 XT_{8}	December 11, 1998
(59177) 1999 AT_{7}	January 11, 1999
(59359) 1999 DV	February 16, 1999
(59801) 1999 PY_{4}	August 8, 1999
(66204) 1999 BA_{26}	January 28, 1999
(74313) 1998 US_{6}	October 18, 1998
(74823) 1999 TD_{15}	October 1, 1999
(79769) 1998 UH_{8}	October 22, 1998
(79792) 1998 VQ_{5}	November 9, 1998
(79793) 1998 VR_{5}	November 9, 1998
(79914) 1999 CK_{3}	February 7, 1999
(80103) 1999 PA	August 2, 1999
(80665) 2000 BD_{11}	January 28, 2000
(85873) 1999 CE_{1}	February 5, 1999
(85968) 1999 GB_{2}	April 8, 1999
(96613) 1999 CG_{5}	February 12, 1999
(96745) 1999 PB	August 2, 1999
(100750) 1998 EX_{8}	March 6, 1998
(101401) 1998 VD	November 7, 1998

(101408) 1998 VC_{6}	November 11, 1998
(101460) 1998 WH_{7}	November 23, 1998
(101565) 1999 AD_{21}	January 13, 1999
(101601) 1999 CM	February 4, 1999
(101900) 1999 QH	August 18, 1999
(101904) 1999 RD_{1}	September 4, 1999
(103014) 1999 XD_{104}	December 9, 1999
(120972) 1998 WE_{4}	November 20, 1998
(121208) 1999 PZ_{4}	August 8, 1999
(129753) 1999 DG_{3}	February 21, 1999
(137045) 1998 VE	November 7, 1998
(168441) 1998 WD_{3}	November 18, 1998
(185731) 1998 VO_{5}	November 8, 1998
(222055) 1998 WF_{3}	November 18, 1998
(312971) 1998 VE_{34}	November 15, 1998
^{1} with T. Urata
