= List of minor planets: 600001–601000 =

The following is a partial list of minor planets, running from minor-planet number 600001 through 601000, inclusive. The primary data for this and other partial lists is based on JPL's "Small-Body Orbital Elements" and data available from the Minor Planet Center. Critical list information is also provided by the MPC, unless otherwise specified from Lowell Observatory. A detailed description of the table's columns and additional sources are given on the main page including a complete list of every page in this series, and a statistical break-up on the dynamical classification of minor planets.

Also see the summary list of all named bodies in numerical and alphabetical order, and the corresponding naming citations for the number range of this particular list. New namings may only be added to this list after official publication, as the preannouncement of names is condemned by the Working Group for Small Bodies Nomenclature of the International Astronomical Union.

Near-Earth obj.	MBA (inner)	MBA (outer)	Centaur
Mars-crosser	MBA (middle)	Jupiter trojan	Trans-Neptunian obj.
Unclassified

== 600001–600100 ==
Designation			Discovery			Properties		Ref
Permanent	Provisional	Named after	Date	Site	Discoverer(s)	Category	Diam.	Ref
600001	2011 EQ_{29}	—	March 6, 2011	Bergisch Gladbach	W. Bickel	·	3.7 km	MPC; JPL
600002	2011 EU_{37}	—	March 6, 2011	Kitt Peak	Spacewatch	·	2.1 km	MPC; JPL
600003	2011 EN_{38}	—	March 6, 2011	Kitt Peak	Spacewatch	·	1.1 km	MPC; JPL
600004	2011 EY_{41}	—	February 12, 2000	Apache Point	SDSS Collaboration	·	1.2 km	MPC; JPL
600005	2011 EX_{45}	—	March 10, 2011	Kitt Peak	Spacewatch	JUN	1.1 km	MPC; JPL
600006	2011 EC_{46}	—	March 10, 2011	Kitt Peak	Spacewatch	PHO	720 m	MPC; JPL
600007	2011 EB_{47}	—	March 26, 2007	Kitt Peak	Spacewatch	·	2.1 km	MPC; JPL
600008	2011 EO_{47}	—	February 25, 2011	Mount Lemmon	Mount Lemmon Survey	·	2.4 km	MPC; JPL
600009	2011 ED_{48}	—	May 25, 2006	Mauna Kea	Wiegert, P.	(260)	3.2 km	MPC; JPL
600010	2011 EV_{56}	—	March 23, 2003	Apache Point	SDSS Collaboration	·	820 m	MPC; JPL
600011	2011 EJ_{64}	—	January 13, 1996	Kitt Peak	Spacewatch	·	1.1 km	MPC; JPL
600012	2011 EQ_{70}	—	March 10, 2011	Kitt Peak	Spacewatch	·	1.3 km	MPC; JPL
600013	2011 EA_{90}	—	March 10, 2011	Kitt Peak	Spacewatch	·	820 m	MPC; JPL
600014	2011 ES_{91}	—	March 14, 2011	Mount Lemmon	Mount Lemmon Survey	·	920 m	MPC; JPL
600015	2011 EU_{92}	—	March 6, 2011	Mount Lemmon	Mount Lemmon Survey	·	1.1 km	MPC; JPL
600016	2011 ES_{97}	—	August 4, 2013	Haleakala	Pan-STARRS 1	URS	2.8 km	MPC; JPL
600017	2011 EY_{97}	—	November 7, 2015	Haleakala	Pan-STARRS 1	·	2.9 km	MPC; JPL
600018	2011 ES_{104}	—	March 1, 2011	Mount Lemmon	Mount Lemmon Survey	NYS	910 m	MPC; JPL
600019	2011 FJ_{5}	—	March 24, 2011	Piszkés-tető	K. Sárneczky, Z. Kuli	·	1.0 km	MPC; JPL
600020	2011 FV_{16}	—	September 30, 2005	Mount Lemmon	Mount Lemmon Survey	·	1.5 km	MPC; JPL
600021	2011 FE_{20}	—	July 31, 2000	Cerro Tololo	Deep Ecliptic Survey	(5)	920 m	MPC; JPL
600022	2011 FX_{22}	—	March 29, 2011	Piszkés-tető	K. Sárneczky, Z. Kuli	·	1.5 km	MPC; JPL
600023	2011 FA_{24}	—	March 28, 2011	Mount Lemmon	Mount Lemmon Survey	EUN	1.0 km	MPC; JPL
600024	2011 FV_{37}	—	April 25, 2003	Kitt Peak	Spacewatch	(5)	840 m	MPC; JPL
600025	2011 FK_{38}	—	March 30, 2011	Mount Lemmon	Mount Lemmon Survey	·	810 m	MPC; JPL
600026	2011 FM_{40}	—	August 12, 2007	Socorro	LINEAR	·	1.3 km	MPC; JPL
600027	2011 FG_{47}	—	February 7, 2002	Palomar	NEAT	·	1.3 km	MPC; JPL
600028	2011 FQ_{47}	—	November 9, 1996	Kitt Peak	Spacewatch	·	1.3 km	MPC; JPL
600029	2011 FD_{53}	—	April 4, 2003	Kitt Peak	Spacewatch	·	990 m	MPC; JPL
600030	2011 FN_{57}	—	March 30, 2011	Mount Lemmon	Mount Lemmon Survey	·	1.3 km	MPC; JPL
600031	2011 FL_{59}	—	September 13, 2007	Mount Lemmon	Mount Lemmon Survey	·	3.1 km	MPC; JPL
600032	2011 FZ_{60}	—	March 11, 2011	Mount Lemmon	Mount Lemmon Survey	·	1.4 km	MPC; JPL
600033	2011 FZ_{69}	—	March 29, 2011	Mount Lemmon	Mount Lemmon Survey	H	470 m	MPC; JPL
600034	2011 FV_{70}	—	November 1, 2005	Kitt Peak	Spacewatch	·	840 m	MPC; JPL
600035	2011 FB_{76}	—	February 23, 2007	Kitt Peak	Spacewatch	·	1.1 km	MPC; JPL
600036	2011 FP_{87}	—	April 1, 2011	Mount Lemmon	Mount Lemmon Survey	PHO	780 m	MPC; JPL
600037	2011 FE_{98}	—	August 27, 2005	Palomar	NEAT	·	1.6 km	MPC; JPL
600038	2011 FU_{100}	—	February 25, 2011	Kitt Peak	Spacewatch	·	1.2 km	MPC; JPL
600039	2011 FW_{100}	—	December 10, 2001	Nashville	Clingan, R.	·	1.2 km	MPC; JPL
600040	2011 FF_{109}	—	April 5, 2011	Mount Lemmon	Mount Lemmon Survey	·	1.1 km	MPC; JPL
600041	2011 FD_{110}	—	October 6, 2005	Mount Lemmon	Mount Lemmon Survey	V	470 m	MPC; JPL
600042	2011 FS_{110}	—	April 1, 2011	Mount Lemmon	Mount Lemmon Survey	·	870 m	MPC; JPL
600043	2011 FE_{127}	—	March 25, 2011	Mount Lemmon	Mount Lemmon Survey	·	1.3 km	MPC; JPL
600044	2011 FU_{131}	—	April 5, 2011	Mount Lemmon	Mount Lemmon Survey	·	1.4 km	MPC; JPL
600045	2011 FT_{135}	—	March 29, 2011	Mount Lemmon	Mount Lemmon Survey	NYS	1.1 km	MPC; JPL
600046	2011 FH_{137}	—	March 14, 2011	Mount Lemmon	Mount Lemmon Survey	·	1.3 km	MPC; JPL
600047	2011 FF_{141}	—	March 25, 2011	Haleakala	Pan-STARRS 1	·	1.9 km	MPC; JPL
600048	2011 FS_{148}	—	February 10, 2003	Kitt Peak	Spacewatch	·	1.7 km	MPC; JPL
600049	2011 FV_{150}	—	March 11, 2011	Kitt Peak	Spacewatch	·	1.2 km	MPC; JPL
600050	2011 FJ_{153}	—	April 2, 2011	Mount Lemmon	Mount Lemmon Survey	·	3.3 km	MPC; JPL
600051	2011 FH_{160}	—	November 1, 2013	Mount Lemmon	Mount Lemmon Survey	·	1.0 km	MPC; JPL
600052	2011 FN_{163}	—	March 22, 2015	Haleakala	Pan-STARRS 1	·	930 m	MPC; JPL
600053	2011 FQ_{163}	—	March 27, 2011	Mount Lemmon	Mount Lemmon Survey	·	870 m	MPC; JPL
600054	2011 FB_{168}	—	March 28, 2011	Catalina	CSS	·	1.4 km	MPC; JPL
600055	2011 GN	—	April 1, 2011	Kitt Peak	Spacewatch	·	1.0 km	MPC; JPL
600056	2011 GK_{4}	—	August 27, 2001	Kitt Peak	Spacewatch	NYS	1.2 km	MPC; JPL
600057	2011 GL_{8}	—	April 2, 2011	Mount Lemmon	Mount Lemmon Survey	·	1.3 km	MPC; JPL
600058	2011 GG_{9}	—	April 2, 2011	Mount Lemmon	Mount Lemmon Survey	EOS	1.9 km	MPC; JPL
600059	2011 GN_{11}	—	April 1, 2011	Mount Lemmon	Mount Lemmon Survey	VER	1.9 km	MPC; JPL
600060	2011 GB_{13}	—	April 1, 2011	Mount Lemmon	Mount Lemmon Survey	KON	1.7 km	MPC; JPL
600061	2011 GE_{15}	—	April 1, 2011	Mount Lemmon	Mount Lemmon Survey	PHO	970 m	MPC; JPL
600062	2011 GF_{18}	—	September 5, 2008	Kitt Peak	Spacewatch	·	830 m	MPC; JPL
600063	2011 GH_{18}	—	July 30, 2008	Mount Lemmon	Mount Lemmon Survey	·	1.0 km	MPC; JPL
600064	2011 GW_{19}	—	April 2, 2011	Mount Lemmon	Mount Lemmon Survey	·	930 m	MPC; JPL
600065	2011 GD_{39}	—	April 4, 2011	Mount Lemmon	Mount Lemmon Survey	·	1.5 km	MPC; JPL
600066	2011 GC_{50}	—	April 4, 2011	Kitt Peak	Spacewatch	·	1.0 km	MPC; JPL
600067	2011 GV_{53}	—	March 29, 2011	Mount Lemmon	Mount Lemmon Survey	·	680 m	MPC; JPL
600068	2011 GM_{69}	—	April 13, 2011	Haleakala	Pan-STARRS 1	PHO	960 m	MPC; JPL
600069	2011 GX_{70}	—	September 18, 2009	Kitt Peak	Spacewatch	H	460 m	MPC; JPL
600070	2011 GV_{73}	—	April 2, 2011	Kitt Peak	Spacewatch	·	1.1 km	MPC; JPL
600071	2011 GX_{77}	—	April 4, 2011	Kitt Peak	Spacewatch	H	400 m	MPC; JPL
600072	2011 GK_{78}	—	April 2, 2011	Haleakala	Pan-STARRS 1	BAR	1.2 km	MPC; JPL
600073	2011 GL_{82}	—	March 1, 2011	Mount Lemmon	Mount Lemmon Survey	·	980 m	MPC; JPL
600074	2011 GY_{86}	—	October 16, 2009	Mount Lemmon	Mount Lemmon Survey	·	600 m	MPC; JPL
600075	2011 GH_{87}	—	April 6, 2011	Mount Lemmon	Mount Lemmon Survey	·	1.6 km	MPC; JPL
600076	2011 GF_{91}	—	March 21, 2015	Haleakala	Pan-STARRS 1	·	1.1 km	MPC; JPL
600077	2011 GW_{92}	—	April 5, 2011	Kitt Peak	Spacewatch	·	1.5 km	MPC; JPL
600078	2011 GA_{93}	—	March 16, 2015	Haleakala	Pan-STARRS 1	EUN	840 m	MPC; JPL
600079	2011 GW_{96}	—	April 2, 2011	Kitt Peak	Spacewatch	·	860 m	MPC; JPL
600080	2011 GS_{98}	—	April 5, 2011	Kitt Peak	Spacewatch	·	1.4 km	MPC; JPL
600081	2011 GB_{100}	—	April 4, 2011	Kitt Peak	Spacewatch	ADE	1.3 km	MPC; JPL
600082	2011 GM_{101}	—	April 13, 2011	Kitt Peak	Spacewatch	·	1.4 km	MPC; JPL
600083	2011 GY_{101}	—	April 3, 2011	Haleakala	Pan-STARRS 1	·	860 m	MPC; JPL
600084	2011 HD_{5}	—	April 25, 2011	Mount Lemmon	Mount Lemmon Survey	T_{j} (2.99) · EUP	2.8 km	MPC; JPL
600085	2011 HD_{7}	—	April 24, 2011	Kitt Peak	Spacewatch	·	1.7 km	MPC; JPL
600086	2011 HO_{7}	—	February 25, 2007	Mount Lemmon	Mount Lemmon Survey	·	1.0 km	MPC; JPL
600087	2011 HC_{15}	—	September 2, 2008	Kitt Peak	Spacewatch	·	1.2 km	MPC; JPL
600088	2011 HS_{25}	—	April 6, 2011	Mount Lemmon	Mount Lemmon Survey	·	890 m	MPC; JPL
600089	2011 HK_{31}	—	April 23, 2011	Haleakala	Pan-STARRS 1	ADE	1.4 km	MPC; JPL
600090	2011 HG_{35}	—	October 27, 2008	Kitt Peak	Spacewatch	·	3.1 km	MPC; JPL
600091	2011 HO_{42}	—	April 6, 2011	Mount Lemmon	Mount Lemmon Survey	·	1.2 km	MPC; JPL
600092	2011 HS_{43}	—	April 23, 2011	Kitt Peak	Spacewatch	·	890 m	MPC; JPL
600093	2011 HK_{49}	—	April 28, 2011	Haleakala	Pan-STARRS 1	·	1.2 km	MPC; JPL
600094	2011 HM_{52}	—	December 28, 2005	Kitt Peak	Spacewatch	·	1.3 km	MPC; JPL
600095	2011 HS_{54}	—	April 23, 2011	Haleakala	Pan-STARRS 1	·	950 m	MPC; JPL
600096	2011 HK_{55}	—	April 6, 2011	Mount Lemmon	Mount Lemmon Survey	·	1.1 km	MPC; JPL
600097	2011 HK_{60}	—	April 22, 2011	Kitt Peak	Spacewatch	·	1.6 km	MPC; JPL
600098	2011 HT_{92}	—	March 26, 2011	Kitt Peak	Spacewatch	·	950 m	MPC; JPL
600099	2011 HB_{94}	—	April 11, 2011	Mount Lemmon	Mount Lemmon Survey	EUN	640 m	MPC; JPL
600100	2011 HQ_{96}	—	November 17, 2009	Mount Lemmon	Mount Lemmon Survey	·	770 m	MPC; JPL

== 600101–600200 ==
back to top

Designation			Discovery			Properties		Ref
Permanent	Provisional	Named after	Date	Site	Discoverer(s)	Category	Diam.	Ref
600101	2011 HZ_{99}	—	January 30, 2011	Haleakala	Pan-STARRS 1	·	980 m	MPC; JPL
600102	2011 HR_{100}	—	September 6, 2008	Mount Lemmon	Mount Lemmon Survey	·	1.7 km	MPC; JPL
600103	2011 HX_{104}	—	January 22, 2015	Haleakala	Pan-STARRS 1	·	1.0 km	MPC; JPL
600104	2011 HH_{105}	—	April 27, 2011	Mount Lemmon	Mount Lemmon Survey	·	1.4 km	MPC; JPL
600105	2011 HM_{106}	—	April 30, 2011	Mount Lemmon	Mount Lemmon Survey	·	830 m	MPC; JPL
600106	2011 HJ_{108}	—	October 19, 2012	Haleakala	Pan-STARRS 1	H	370 m	MPC; JPL
600107	2011 HG_{110}	—	April 26, 2011	Kitt Peak	Spacewatch	·	1.1 km	MPC; JPL
600108	2011 JR	—	May 25, 2006	Mauna Kea	Wiegert, P.	T_{j} (2.98) · EUP	3.5 km	MPC; JPL
600109	2011 JK_{2}	—	May 4, 2011	Dauban	C. Rinner, Kugel, F.	BAR	1.1 km	MPC; JPL
600110	2011 JW_{5}	—	March 25, 2007	Mount Lemmon	Mount Lemmon Survey	·	950 m	MPC; JPL
600111	2011 JA_{9}	—	May 16, 2007	Mount Lemmon	Mount Lemmon Survey	·	1.2 km	MPC; JPL
600112	2011 JP_{16}	—	May 1, 2011	Haleakala	Pan-STARRS 1	·	1.6 km	MPC; JPL
600113	2011 JB_{20}	—	February 26, 2007	Mount Lemmon	Mount Lemmon Survey	·	1.3 km	MPC; JPL
600114	2011 JY_{21}	—	May 1, 2011	Haleakala	Pan-STARRS 1	·	1.3 km	MPC; JPL
600115	2011 JB_{33}	—	May 6, 2011	Kitt Peak	Spacewatch	·	1.2 km	MPC; JPL
600116	2011 JN_{33}	—	December 13, 2013	Mount Lemmon	Mount Lemmon Survey	EUN	1.0 km	MPC; JPL
600117	2011 KY_{4}	—	May 21, 2011	Mount Lemmon	Mount Lemmon Survey	·	810 m	MPC; JPL
600118	2011 KH_{9}	—	May 24, 2011	Mount Lemmon	Mount Lemmon Survey	H	450 m	MPC; JPL
600119	2011 KM_{17}	—	May 29, 2011	Nogales	M. Schwartz, P. R. Holvorcem	·	830 m	MPC; JPL
600120	2011 KK_{18}	—	February 27, 2006	Mount Lemmon	Mount Lemmon Survey	·	1.6 km	MPC; JPL
600121	2011 KZ_{18}	—	May 3, 2011	Mount Lemmon	Mount Lemmon Survey	JUN	780 m	MPC; JPL
600122	2011 KU_{20}	—	May 11, 2011	Nogales	M. Schwartz, P. R. Holvorcem	JUN	1.0 km	MPC; JPL
600123	2011 KC_{24}	—	May 29, 2011	Mount Lemmon	Mount Lemmon Survey	·	930 m	MPC; JPL
600124	2011 KJ_{25}	—	May 21, 2011	Haleakala	Pan-STARRS 1	·	1.3 km	MPC; JPL
600125	2011 KF_{26}	—	May 23, 2011	Nogales	M. Schwartz, P. R. Holvorcem	·	1.4 km	MPC; JPL
600126	2011 KD_{30}	—	July 12, 2005	Mount Lemmon	Mount Lemmon Survey	·	770 m	MPC; JPL
600127	2011 KJ_{30}	—	March 20, 2002	Palomar	NEAT	·	1.8 km	MPC; JPL
600128	2011 KC_{41}	—	May 24, 2011	Haleakala	Pan-STARRS 1	3:2 · SHU	4.4 km	MPC; JPL
600129	2011 KV_{41}	—	May 24, 2011	Haleakala	Pan-STARRS 1	3:2 · SHU	4.1 km	MPC; JPL
600130	2011 KM_{42}	—	February 21, 2007	Mount Lemmon	Mount Lemmon Survey	MAS	670 m	MPC; JPL
600131	2011 KT_{48}	—	April 10, 2002	Palomar	NEAT	·	2.5 km	MPC; JPL
600132	2011 KQ_{49}	—	May 30, 2011	Haleakala	Pan-STARRS 1	HNS	940 m	MPC; JPL
600133	2011 KZ_{49}	—	March 30, 2015	Haleakala	Pan-STARRS 1	·	1.2 km	MPC; JPL
600134	2011 KB_{50}	—	May 27, 2011	Nogales	M. Schwartz, P. R. Holvorcem	·	1.1 km	MPC; JPL
600135	2011 KE_{50}	—	April 14, 2015	Mount Lemmon	Mount Lemmon Survey	·	810 m	MPC; JPL
600136	2011 KN_{50}	—	May 21, 2011	Mount Lemmon	Mount Lemmon Survey	·	870 m	MPC; JPL
600137	2011 KQ_{50}	—	May 22, 2011	Mount Lemmon	Mount Lemmon Survey	·	970 m	MPC; JPL
600138	2011 KV_{53}	—	May 26, 2011	Mount Lemmon	Mount Lemmon Survey	·	1.4 km	MPC; JPL
600139	2011 KJ_{54}	—	May 26, 2011	Mount Lemmon	Mount Lemmon Survey	·	1.0 km	MPC; JPL
600140	2011 KQ_{55}	—	May 24, 2011	Haleakala	Pan-STARRS 1	·	1.4 km	MPC; JPL
600141	2011 LN	—	May 26, 2011	Bergisch Gladbach	W. Bickel	·	1.2 km	MPC; JPL
600142	2011 LA_{1}	—	June 3, 2011	Catalina	CSS	·	1.6 km	MPC; JPL
600143	2011 LJ_{2}	—	September 14, 2007	Mount Lemmon	Mount Lemmon Survey	·	1.1 km	MPC; JPL
600144	2011 LR_{2}	—	December 14, 2001	Kitt Peak	Spacewatch	·	1.1 km	MPC; JPL
600145	2011 LW_{8}	—	May 22, 2011	Kitt Peak	Spacewatch	·	1.3 km	MPC; JPL
600146	2011 LT_{18}	—	May 27, 2011	Kitt Peak	Spacewatch	H	460 m	MPC; JPL
600147	2011 LZ_{23}	—	June 6, 2011	Haleakala	Pan-STARRS 1	·	1.4 km	MPC; JPL
600148	2011 LU_{29}	—	June 5, 2011	Mount Lemmon	Mount Lemmon Survey	EUN	1.4 km	MPC; JPL
600149	2011 LU_{31}	—	June 5, 2011	Mount Lemmon	Mount Lemmon Survey	·	720 m	MPC; JPL
600150	2011 LQ_{32}	—	June 8, 2011	Haleakala	Pan-STARRS 1	·	1.3 km	MPC; JPL
600151	2011 LF_{33}	—	October 3, 2013	Haleakala	Pan-STARRS 1	3:2	4.9 km	MPC; JPL
600152	2011 LF_{34}	—	June 6, 2011	Mount Lemmon	Mount Lemmon Survey	3:2	4.5 km	MPC; JPL
600153	2011 LR_{34}	—	June 11, 2011	Haleakala	Pan-STARRS 1	·	2.0 km	MPC; JPL
600154	2011 MA_{5}	—	June 28, 2011	Mount Lemmon	Mount Lemmon Survey	·	1.4 km	MPC; JPL
600155	2011 MY_{7}	—	May 30, 2011	Haleakala	Pan-STARRS 1	·	3.1 km	MPC; JPL
600156	2011 MK_{8}	—	June 24, 2011	Kitt Peak	Spacewatch	JUN	1.1 km	MPC; JPL
600157	2011 MN_{15}	—	June 25, 2011	Kitt Peak	Spacewatch	MAR	1.2 km	MPC; JPL
600158	2011 NQ_{1}	—	July 13, 2011	Haleakala	Pan-STARRS 1	·	1.4 km	MPC; JPL
600159	2011 NV_{2}	—	June 3, 2011	Mount Lemmon	Mount Lemmon Survey	EUN	950 m	MPC; JPL
600160	2011 NX_{2}	—	June 27, 2011	Mount Lemmon	Mount Lemmon Survey	·	2.2 km	MPC; JPL
600161	2011 NH_{4}	—	March 4, 2010	Catalina	CSS	·	1.5 km	MPC; JPL
600162	2011 OQ_{11}	—	July 25, 2011	Haleakala	Pan-STARRS 1	·	1.4 km	MPC; JPL
600163	2011 OY_{11}	—	July 25, 2011	Haleakala	Pan-STARRS 1	·	1.4 km	MPC; JPL
600164	2011 OJ_{12}	—	June 24, 2011	Kitt Peak	Spacewatch	EUN	980 m	MPC; JPL
600165	2011 OZ_{13}	—	July 25, 2011	Haleakala	Pan-STARRS 1	EOS	1.7 km	MPC; JPL
600166	2011 OU_{15}	—	October 5, 2003	Kitt Peak	Spacewatch	EUN	1.0 km	MPC; JPL
600167	2011 OE_{24}	—	July 28, 2011	Siding Spring	SSS	·	1.7 km	MPC; JPL
600168	2011 OV_{25}	—	June 11, 2011	Mount Lemmon	Mount Lemmon Survey	·	1.8 km	MPC; JPL
600169	2011 OV_{26}	—	July 28, 2011	Haleakala	Pan-STARRS 1	H	580 m	MPC; JPL
600170	2011 OJ_{29}	—	July 26, 2011	Haleakala	Pan-STARRS 1	HNS	1 km	MPC; JPL
600171	2011 OM_{35}	—	August 1, 2011	Haleakala	Pan-STARRS 1	·	1.3 km	MPC; JPL
600172	2011 OO_{40}	—	April 10, 2010	Mount Lemmon	Mount Lemmon Survey	·	2.0 km	MPC; JPL
600173	2011 OM_{42}	—	September 15, 2007	Mount Lemmon	Mount Lemmon Survey	NEM	2.1 km	MPC; JPL
600174	2011 OB_{43}	—	July 31, 2011	Haleakala	Pan-STARRS 1	AGN	1.1 km	MPC; JPL
600175	2011 OD_{43}	—	March 9, 2005	Mount Lemmon	Mount Lemmon Survey	·	1.7 km	MPC; JPL
600176	2011 ON_{47}	—	July 28, 2011	Haleakala	Pan-STARRS 1	·	1.8 km	MPC; JPL
600177	2011 OS_{47}	—	July 28, 2011	Haleakala	Pan-STARRS 1	·	1.4 km	MPC; JPL
600178	2011 OP_{49}	—	July 29, 2011	Siding Spring	SSS	MAR	1.2 km	MPC; JPL
600179	2011 OU_{51}	—	July 1, 2011	Mount Lemmon	Mount Lemmon Survey	·	1.4 km	MPC; JPL
600180	2011 OM_{56}	—	July 27, 2011	Haleakala	Pan-STARRS 1	·	1.4 km	MPC; JPL
600181	2011 OC_{61}	—	July 26, 2011	Haleakala	Pan-STARRS 1	cubewano (cold)	181 km	MPC; JPL
600182	2011 OQ_{61}	—	September 16, 2017	Haleakala	Pan-STARRS 1	·	1.9 km	MPC; JPL
600183	2011 OX_{61}	—	October 10, 2012	Haleakala	Pan-STARRS 1	·	2.0 km	MPC; JPL
600184	2011 OQ_{65}	—	July 26, 2011	Haleakala	Pan-STARRS 1	·	1.7 km	MPC; JPL
600185	2011 OH_{68}	—	November 13, 2012	Mount Lemmon	Mount Lemmon Survey	·	1.4 km	MPC; JPL
600186	2011 OA_{69}	—	July 28, 2011	Haleakala	Pan-STARRS 1	·	1.5 km	MPC; JPL
600187	2011 PJ_{7}	—	September 14, 1998	Kitt Peak	Spacewatch	ADE	1.1 km	MPC; JPL
600188	2011 PU_{7}	—	August 6, 2011	Haleakala	Pan-STARRS 1	·	440 m	MPC; JPL
600189	2011 PR_{9}	—	June 29, 2011	Kitt Peak	Spacewatch	·	2.8 km	MPC; JPL
600190	2011 PG_{10}	—	August 3, 2011	Haleakala	Pan-STARRS 1	(5)	890 m	MPC; JPL
600191	2011 PJ_{12}	—	August 3, 2011	Haleakala	Pan-STARRS 1	·	1.6 km	MPC; JPL
600192	2011 PJ_{15}	—	August 21, 2011	Haleakala	Pan-STARRS 1	TIR	2.6 km	MPC; JPL
600193	2011 PT_{16}	—	August 2, 2011	Haleakala	Pan-STARRS 1	·	1.9 km	MPC; JPL
600194	2011 QR_{3}	—	July 29, 2011	Charleston	R. Holmes	H	370 m	MPC; JPL
600195	2011 QE_{5}	—	August 22, 2003	Palomar	NEAT	·	1.9 km	MPC; JPL
600196	2011 QX_{5}	—	September 20, 2003	Palomar	NEAT	·	1.1 km	MPC; JPL
600197	2011 QW_{6}	—	September 12, 2002	Palomar	NEAT	·	2.0 km	MPC; JPL
600198	2011 QC_{13}	—	October 16, 2007	Catalina	CSS	JUN	1.1 km	MPC; JPL
600199	2011 QN_{13}	—	August 4, 2011	La Sagra	OAM	·	1.4 km	MPC; JPL
600200	2011 QV_{36}	—	August 25, 2011	La Sagra	OAM	·	1.7 km	MPC; JPL

== 600201–600300 ==
back to top

Designation			Discovery			Properties		Ref
Permanent	Provisional	Named after	Date	Site	Discoverer(s)	Category	Diam.	Ref
600201	2011 QD_{38}	—	August 21, 2006	Kitt Peak	Spacewatch	·	390 m	MPC; JPL
600202	2011 QB_{41}	—	August 3, 2011	Haleakala	Pan-STARRS 1	MAR	1.1 km	MPC; JPL
600203	2011 QJ_{42}	—	August 29, 2011	Siding Spring	SSS	·	530 m	MPC; JPL
600204	2011 QF_{43}	—	August 24, 2011	Haleakala	Pan-STARRS 1	·	870 m	MPC; JPL
600205	2011 QW_{46}	—	April 7, 2006	Kitt Peak	Spacewatch	·	1.2 km	MPC; JPL
600206	2011 QE_{51}	—	August 26, 2011	Haleakala	Pan-STARRS 1	·	1.6 km	MPC; JPL
600207	2011 QR_{51}	—	August 31, 2011	Haleakala	Pan-STARRS 1	L5	8.0 km	MPC; JPL
600208	2011 QK_{62}	—	August 31, 2011	Haleakala	Pan-STARRS 1	·	1.6 km	MPC; JPL
600209	2011 QQ_{65}	—	August 24, 2011	Haleakala	Pan-STARRS 1	·	1.7 km	MPC; JPL
600210	2011 QA_{68}	—	April 5, 2002	Palomar	NEAT	·	1.6 km	MPC; JPL
600211	2011 QO_{73}	—	October 18, 2007	Kitt Peak	Spacewatch	·	1.4 km	MPC; JPL
600212	2011 QF_{74}	—	August 20, 2011	Haleakala	Pan-STARRS 1	HOF	2.0 km	MPC; JPL
600213	2011 QV_{79}	—	August 23, 2011	Haleakala	Pan-STARRS 1	·	1.3 km	MPC; JPL
600214	2011 QD_{80}	—	October 11, 2007	Mount Lemmon	Mount Lemmon Survey	·	1.2 km	MPC; JPL
600215	2011 QE_{80}	—	July 28, 2011	Haleakala	Pan-STARRS 1	·	1.7 km	MPC; JPL
600216	2011 QF_{84}	—	December 29, 2008	Kitt Peak	Spacewatch	·	1.8 km	MPC; JPL
600217	2011 QY_{100}	—	August 24, 2011	Haleakala	Pan-STARRS 1	centaur	126 km	MPC; JPL
600218	2011 QD_{102}	—	September 27, 2016	Haleakala	Pan-STARRS 1	·	1.5 km	MPC; JPL
600219	2011 QY_{102}	—	August 20, 2011	Haleakala	Pan-STARRS 1	·	1.6 km	MPC; JPL
600220	2011 QL_{108}	—	October 22, 2017	Mount Lemmon	Mount Lemmon Survey	·	1.5 km	MPC; JPL
600221	2011 QW_{112}	—	August 24, 2011	La Sagra	OAM	JUN	790 m	MPC; JPL
600222	2011 QF_{113}	—	August 24, 2011	Haleakala	Pan-STARRS 1	·	1.2 km	MPC; JPL
600223	2011 QK_{114}	—	August 24, 2011	Haleakala	Pan-STARRS 1	VER	2.4 km	MPC; JPL
600224	2011 RN_{2}	—	November 18, 2007	Kitt Peak	Spacewatch	·	1.5 km	MPC; JPL
600225	2011 RF_{8}	—	September 6, 2011	Haleakala	Pan-STARRS 1	·	1.4 km	MPC; JPL
600226	2011 RZ_{10}	—	September 15, 2002	Palomar	NEAT	·	1.9 km	MPC; JPL
600227	2011 RP_{12}	—	September 25, 1998	Kitt Peak	Spacewatch	·	1.4 km	MPC; JPL
600228	2011 RT_{12}	—	May 31, 2006	Mount Lemmon	Mount Lemmon Survey	·	1.2 km	MPC; JPL
600229	2011 RZ_{18}	—	January 14, 2008	Kitt Peak	Spacewatch	THM	2.0 km	MPC; JPL
600230	2011 RJ_{25}	—	March 29, 2014	Mount Lemmon	Mount Lemmon Survey	·	1.7 km	MPC; JPL
600231	2011 RC_{26}	—	September 4, 2011	Haleakala	Pan-STARRS 1	·	1.8 km	MPC; JPL
600232	2011 RF_{29}	—	September 8, 2011	Kitt Peak	Spacewatch	·	1.4 km	MPC; JPL
600233	2011 RP_{34}	—	September 8, 2011	Kitt Peak	Spacewatch	THM	1.8 km	MPC; JPL
600234	2011 RN_{35}	—	September 4, 2011	Haleakala	Pan-STARRS 1	·	1.3 km	MPC; JPL
600235	2011 RO_{35}	—	September 4, 2011	Haleakala	Pan-STARRS 1	·	1.2 km	MPC; JPL
600236	2011 SC_{28}	—	September 19, 2011	Mount Lemmon	Mount Lemmon Survey	·	1.9 km	MPC; JPL
600237	2011 SZ_{28}	—	August 30, 2011	La Sagra	OAM	(1547)	1.4 km	MPC; JPL
600238	2011 SH_{33}	—	September 4, 2011	Haleakala	Pan-STARRS 1	·	1.3 km	MPC; JPL
600239	2011 SF_{39}	—	August 27, 2000	Cerro Tololo	Deep Ecliptic Survey	·	2.5 km	MPC; JPL
600240	2011 SF_{50}	—	January 30, 2009	Mount Lemmon	Mount Lemmon Survey	AGN	940 m	MPC; JPL
600241	2011 SR_{52}	—	October 8, 2002	Kitt Peak	Spacewatch	·	1.3 km	MPC; JPL
600242	2011 SM_{58}	—	September 18, 2011	Mount Lemmon	Mount Lemmon Survey	KOR	1.0 km	MPC; JPL
600243	2011 SG_{59}	—	May 4, 2005	Mauna Kea	Veillet, C.	HOF	2.1 km	MPC; JPL
600244	2011 SG_{61}	—	September 20, 2011	Haleakala	Pan-STARRS 1	·	1.6 km	MPC; JPL
600245	2011 ST_{69}	—	May 19, 2010	Mount Lemmon	Mount Lemmon Survey	NEM	2.4 km	MPC; JPL
600246	2011 SW_{75}	—	August 1, 2011	Haleakala	Pan-STARRS 1	·	1.1 km	MPC; JPL
600247	2011 SC_{79}	—	September 4, 2011	Haleakala	Pan-STARRS 1	·	1.6 km	MPC; JPL
600248	2011 SW_{83}	—	October 21, 2008	Kitt Peak	Spacewatch	·	560 m	MPC; JPL
600249	2011 SF_{84}	—	September 8, 2011	Kitt Peak	Spacewatch	·	1.8 km	MPC; JPL
600250	2011 SG_{85}	—	September 19, 1998	Apache Point	SDSS Collaboration	·	690 m	MPC; JPL
600251	2011 SJ_{94}	—	September 24, 2011	Haleakala	Pan-STARRS 1	·	1.4 km	MPC; JPL
600252	2011 SE_{98}	—	April 28, 2000	Kitt Peak	Spacewatch	·	1.9 km	MPC; JPL
600253	2011 SY_{101}	—	August 21, 2006	Kitt Peak	Spacewatch	KOR	1.3 km	MPC; JPL
600254	2011 SH_{103}	—	August 29, 2011	Mayhill-ISON	L. Elenin	·	590 m	MPC; JPL
600255	2011 SJ_{103}	—	August 25, 2000	Kitt Peak	Spacewatch	TIR	2.7 km	MPC; JPL
600256	2011 SU_{108}	—	January 25, 2009	Kitt Peak	Spacewatch	·	2.3 km	MPC; JPL
600257	2011 SD_{110}	—	March 31, 2003	Cerro Tololo	Deep Lens Survey	·	3.7 km	MPC; JPL
600258	2011 SZ_{111}	—	September 27, 2002	Palomar	NEAT	·	2.0 km	MPC; JPL
600259	2011 SB_{122}	—	March 15, 2010	Kitt Peak	Spacewatch	·	1.3 km	MPC; JPL
600260	2011 SA_{131}	—	September 23, 2011	Haleakala	Pan-STARRS 1	MRX	900 m	MPC; JPL
600261	2011 SQ_{136}	—	September 23, 2011	Kitt Peak	Spacewatch	·	1.5 km	MPC; JPL
600262	2011 SA_{148}	—	September 26, 2011	Mount Lemmon	Mount Lemmon Survey	·	1.4 km	MPC; JPL
600263	2011 ST_{149}	—	October 19, 2006	Kitt Peak	Deep Ecliptic Survey	KOR	1.3 km	MPC; JPL
600264	2011 SL_{152}	—	July 5, 2005	Kitt Peak	Spacewatch	THM	2.3 km	MPC; JPL
600265	2011 SA_{156}	—	September 26, 2011	Haleakala	Pan-STARRS 1	KOR	1.1 km	MPC; JPL
600266	2011 SK_{159}	—	June 1, 2009	Mount Lemmon	Mount Lemmon Survey	·	3.6 km	MPC; JPL
600267	2011 SE_{168}	—	September 28, 2011	Mount Lemmon	Mount Lemmon Survey	HOF	1.9 km	MPC; JPL
600268	2011 SP_{171}	—	September 28, 2011	Mount Lemmon	Mount Lemmon Survey	V	560 m	MPC; JPL
600269	2011 SG_{180}	—	April 25, 2006	Kitt Peak	Spacewatch	·	1.3 km	MPC; JPL
600270	2011 SC_{195}	—	August 7, 2011	La Sagra	OAM	·	1.7 km	MPC; JPL
600271	2011 SZ_{196}	—	September 18, 2011	Mount Lemmon	Mount Lemmon Survey	MRX	800 m	MPC; JPL
600272	2011 SY_{197}	—	September 18, 2011	Mount Lemmon	Mount Lemmon Survey	KOR	1.3 km	MPC; JPL
600273	2011 SE_{198}	—	September 18, 2011	Mount Lemmon	Mount Lemmon Survey	GEF	1.2 km	MPC; JPL
600274	2011 SZ_{205}	—	November 18, 2000	Kitt Peak	Spacewatch	THM	2.1 km	MPC; JPL
600275	2011 SM_{213}	—	October 10, 2007	Kitt Peak	Spacewatch	·	1.8 km	MPC; JPL
600276	2011 SZ_{217}	—	February 20, 2009	Kitt Peak	Spacewatch	·	2.1 km	MPC; JPL
600277	2011 SF_{221}	—	September 7, 2011	Kitt Peak	Spacewatch	AEO	990 m	MPC; JPL
600278	2011 SG_{221}	—	September 8, 2011	Kitt Peak	Spacewatch	·	1.7 km	MPC; JPL
600279	2011 SR_{223}	—	June 9, 2011	Mount Lemmon	Mount Lemmon Survey	·	1.2 km	MPC; JPL
600280	2011 SC_{226}	—	July 31, 2005	Palomar	NEAT	·	2.7 km	MPC; JPL
600281	2011 SG_{227}	—	October 3, 2002	Palomar	NEAT	·	2.3 km	MPC; JPL
600282	2011 SU_{231}	—	September 6, 2007	Dauban	C. Rinner, Kugel, F.	·	1.2 km	MPC; JPL
600283	2011 SC_{234}	—	November 27, 2006	Kitt Peak	Spacewatch	·	2.2 km	MPC; JPL
600284	2011 SO_{240}	—	October 10, 2007	Mount Lemmon	Mount Lemmon Survey	·	1.2 km	MPC; JPL
600285	2011 SB_{251}	—	November 2, 2007	Mount Lemmon	Mount Lemmon Survey	·	1.4 km	MPC; JPL
600286	2011 SD_{253}	—	March 19, 2009	Calar Alto	F. Hormuth	·	1.8 km	MPC; JPL
600287	2011 SE_{257}	—	September 23, 2011	Kitt Peak	Spacewatch	TIN	950 m	MPC; JPL
600288	2011 SK_{264}	—	November 24, 2006	Mount Lemmon	Mount Lemmon Survey	THM	1.7 km	MPC; JPL
600289	2011 SH_{271}	—	March 15, 2010	Mount Lemmon	Mount Lemmon Survey	·	1.7 km	MPC; JPL
600290	2011 SZ_{276}	—	October 3, 2006	Mount Lemmon	Mount Lemmon Survey	·	1.5 km	MPC; JPL
600291	2011 SJ_{283}	—	September 8, 2011	Kitt Peak	Spacewatch	GEF	930 m	MPC; JPL
600292	2011 SU_{284}	—	September 26, 2011	Haleakala	Pan-STARRS 1	·	460 m	MPC; JPL
600293	2011 SY_{286}	—	October 2, 2016	Mount Lemmon	Mount Lemmon Survey	·	1.7 km	MPC; JPL
600294	2011 ST_{287}	—	September 23, 2011	Haleakala	Pan-STARRS 1	·	2.6 km	MPC; JPL
600295	2011 SU_{287}	—	September 24, 2011	Haleakala	Pan-STARRS 1	·	1.8 km	MPC; JPL
600296	2011 SD_{288}	—	September 24, 2011	Haleakala	Pan-STARRS 1	GEF	930 m	MPC; JPL
600297	2011 SS_{295}	—	September 29, 2011	Mount Lemmon	Mount Lemmon Survey	·	2.0 km	MPC; JPL
600298	2011 SN_{302}	—	April 30, 2014	Haleakala	Pan-STARRS 1	·	1.3 km	MPC; JPL
600299	2011 SQ_{302}	—	September 24, 2011	Haleakala	Pan-STARRS 1	·	1.6 km	MPC; JPL
600300	2011 SC_{307}	—	September 26, 2011	Haleakala	Pan-STARRS 1	·	1.4 km	MPC; JPL

== 600301–600400 ==
back to top

Designation			Discovery			Properties		Ref
Permanent	Provisional	Named after	Date	Site	Discoverer(s)	Category	Diam.	Ref
600301	2011 SO_{311}	—	September 21, 2011	Haleakala	Pan-STARRS 1	·	2.4 km	MPC; JPL
600302	2011 SQ_{317}	—	September 24, 2011	Haleakala	Pan-STARRS 1	·	1.4 km	MPC; JPL
600303	2011 SE_{324}	—	September 24, 2011	Mount Lemmon	Mount Lemmon Survey	·	2.0 km	MPC; JPL
600304	2011 SN_{324}	—	September 24, 2011	Mount Lemmon	Mount Lemmon Survey	·	1.1 km	MPC; JPL
600305	2011 SY_{326}	—	September 28, 2011	Kitt Peak	Spacewatch	MAS	580 m	MPC; JPL
600306	2011 SG_{334}	—	September 21, 2011	Mount Lemmon	Mount Lemmon Survey	·	1.3 km	MPC; JPL
600307	2011 SJ_{334}	—	September 19, 2011	La Sagra	OAM	H	430 m	MPC; JPL
600308	2011 SK_{337}	—	September 21, 2011	Mount Lemmon	Mount Lemmon Survey	KOR	1.1 km	MPC; JPL
600309	2011 TK_{3}	—	October 3, 2011	Taunus	Karge, S., R. Kling	·	1.8 km	MPC; JPL
600310	2011 TZ_{9}	—	August 18, 2006	Palomar	NEAT	·	2.2 km	MPC; JPL
600311	2011 TE_{18}	—	April 8, 2010	Mount Lemmon	Mount Lemmon Survey	·	1.5 km	MPC; JPL
600312	2011 TY_{18}	—	February 27, 2014	Kitt Peak	Spacewatch	·	1.5 km	MPC; JPL
600313	2011 TS_{19}	—	October 27, 2016	Mount Lemmon	Mount Lemmon Survey	KOR	1.2 km	MPC; JPL
600314	2011 UL_{2}	—	October 21, 2001	Socorro	LINEAR	·	600 m	MPC; JPL
600315	2011 UB_{4}	—	September 2, 2011	Haleakala	Pan-STARRS 1	·	1.5 km	MPC; JPL
600316	2011 UQ_{4}	—	October 18, 2011	Mount Lemmon	Mount Lemmon Survey	HOF	1.9 km	MPC; JPL
600317	2011 UC_{12}	—	October 21, 2001	Socorro	LINEAR	·	610 m	MPC; JPL
600318	2011 UC_{34}	—	July 9, 2011	Haleakala	Pan-STARRS 1	526	1.8 km	MPC; JPL
600319	2011 UR_{37}	—	October 20, 2011	Kitt Peak	Spacewatch	BRA	1.4 km	MPC; JPL
600320	2011 UD_{43}	—	October 19, 2011	Mount Lemmon	Mount Lemmon Survey	·	1.5 km	MPC; JPL
600321	2011 UV_{56}	—	November 24, 2000	Kitt Peak	Spacewatch	LIX	2.9 km	MPC; JPL
600322	2011 UD_{61}	—	October 21, 2011	Mount Lemmon	Mount Lemmon Survey	BRA	1.2 km	MPC; JPL
600323	2011 UJ_{71}	—	December 31, 2007	Mount Lemmon	Mount Lemmon Survey	·	1.9 km	MPC; JPL
600324	2011 UD_{72}	—	June 5, 2010	Nogales	M. Schwartz, P. R. Holvorcem	·	2.4 km	MPC; JPL
600325	2011 UL_{75}	—	October 2, 2006	Mount Lemmon	Mount Lemmon Survey	·	2.1 km	MPC; JPL
600326	2011 UW_{78}	—	October 19, 2011	Kitt Peak	Spacewatch	·	1.4 km	MPC; JPL
600327	2011 UN_{81}	—	September 1, 2002	Palomar	NEAT	·	1.9 km	MPC; JPL
600328	2011 UY_{82}	—	October 19, 2011	Kitt Peak	Spacewatch	·	1.4 km	MPC; JPL
600329	2011 UB_{86}	—	April 11, 2008	Kitt Peak	Spacewatch	·	2.4 km	MPC; JPL
600330	2011 UB_{87}	—	August 29, 2006	Kitt Peak	Spacewatch	AGN	1.1 km	MPC; JPL
600331	2011 UN_{90}	—	October 18, 2011	Catalina	CSS	H	470 m	MPC; JPL
600332	2011 UB_{116}	—	October 6, 2000	Haleakala	NEAT	·	3.9 km	MPC; JPL
600333	2011 UN_{116}	—	October 4, 2006	Mount Lemmon	Mount Lemmon Survey	·	2.4 km	MPC; JPL
600334	2011 UD_{118}	—	September 30, 2011	Piszkés-tető	K. Sárneczky, S. Kürti	·	1.7 km	MPC; JPL
600335	2011 UF_{135}	—	October 19, 2011	Kitt Peak	Spacewatch	H	390 m	MPC; JPL
600336	2011 UL_{164}	—	October 23, 2003	Apache Point	SDSS Collaboration	·	1.9 km	MPC; JPL
600337	2011 UT_{183}	—	March 23, 2003	Apache Point	SDSS Collaboration	·	2.4 km	MPC; JPL
600338	2011 UT_{185}	—	October 25, 2011	Haleakala	Pan-STARRS 1	·	2.0 km	MPC; JPL
600339	2011 UQ_{192}	—	August 16, 2006	Palomar	NEAT	TIN	1.2 km	MPC; JPL
600340	2011 UQ_{204}	—	October 8, 2011	Charleston	R. Holmes	·	580 m	MPC; JPL
600341	2011 UB_{213}	—	October 24, 2011	Mount Lemmon	Mount Lemmon Survey	·	1.7 km	MPC; JPL
600342	2011 UK_{220}	—	October 24, 2011	Mount Lemmon	Mount Lemmon Survey	·	1.9 km	MPC; JPL
600343	2011 UC_{221}	—	October 24, 2011	Mount Lemmon	Mount Lemmon Survey	·	1.6 km	MPC; JPL
600344	2011 UN_{223}	—	September 21, 2011	Kitt Peak	Spacewatch	·	1.5 km	MPC; JPL
600345	2011 UZ_{224}	—	October 20, 2011	Mount Lemmon	Mount Lemmon Survey	·	650 m	MPC; JPL
600346	2011 UB_{227}	—	October 22, 2006	Kitt Peak	Spacewatch	·	2.1 km	MPC; JPL
600347	2011 UA_{231}	—	October 24, 2011	Mount Lemmon	Mount Lemmon Survey	·	850 m	MPC; JPL
600348	2011 UX_{241}	—	July 28, 2005	Palomar	NEAT	·	2.6 km	MPC; JPL
600349	2011 UB_{255}	—	April 15, 2010	Kitt Peak	Spacewatch	·	1.7 km	MPC; JPL
600350	2011 UP_{266}	—	April 20, 2010	Mount Lemmon	Mount Lemmon Survey	JUN	1.1 km	MPC; JPL
600351	2011 UZ_{269}	—	November 9, 2007	Kitt Peak	Spacewatch	·	1.8 km	MPC; JPL
600352	2011 UN_{274}	—	October 4, 2006	Mount Lemmon	Mount Lemmon Survey	·	2.5 km	MPC; JPL
600353	2011 UJ_{277}	—	October 24, 2011	Kitt Peak	Spacewatch	·	2.1 km	MPC; JPL
600354	2011 UM_{280}	—	October 25, 2011	XuYi	PMO NEO Survey Program	BRA	1.3 km	MPC; JPL
600355	2011 UY_{306}	—	September 15, 2007	Mount Lemmon	Mount Lemmon Survey	·	990 m	MPC; JPL
600356	2011 UE_{308}	—	October 28, 2011	Kitt Peak	Spacewatch	·	1.3 km	MPC; JPL
600357	2011 UM_{318}	—	October 24, 2011	Haleakala	Pan-STARRS 1	·	1.4 km	MPC; JPL
600358	2011 UA_{321}	—	October 20, 2011	Kitt Peak	Spacewatch	KOR	1.1 km	MPC; JPL
600359	2011 UJ_{321}	—	September 10, 2005	Anderson Mesa	LONEOS	·	4.0 km	MPC; JPL
600360	2011 UT_{322}	—	February 16, 2005	La Silla	A. Boattini	·	2.3 km	MPC; JPL
600361	2011 UB_{323}	—	October 16, 2011	Haleakala	Pan-STARRS 1	·	1.6 km	MPC; JPL
600362	2011 UF_{329}	—	November 18, 2001	Kitt Peak	Spacewatch	·	1.7 km	MPC; JPL
600363	2011 UJ_{333}	—	February 21, 2001	Kitt Peak	Spacewatch	·	1.4 km	MPC; JPL
600364	2011 UV_{336}	—	September 25, 2011	Haleakala	Pan-STARRS 1	·	800 m	MPC; JPL
600365	2011 UB_{339}	—	September 20, 2011	Zelenchukskaya Stn	T. V. Krjačko, Satovski, B.	·	2.4 km	MPC; JPL
600366	2011 UK_{343}	—	April 1, 2003	Apache Point	SDSS Collaboration	·	3.2 km	MPC; JPL
600367	2011 UA_{347}	—	December 20, 2007	Kitt Peak	Spacewatch	·	1.9 km	MPC; JPL
600368	2011 UJ_{347}	—	January 12, 2008	Mount Lemmon	Mount Lemmon Survey	DOR	1.7 km	MPC; JPL
600369	2011 UN_{353}	—	September 29, 2011	Kitt Peak	Spacewatch	·	1.4 km	MPC; JPL
600370	2011 UP_{357}	—	October 20, 2011	Mount Lemmon	Mount Lemmon Survey	·	1.8 km	MPC; JPL
600371	2011 UN_{360}	—	October 21, 2011	Kitt Peak	Spacewatch	·	1.4 km	MPC; JPL
600372	2011 UQ_{362}	—	September 29, 2011	Kitt Peak	Spacewatch	·	1.5 km	MPC; JPL
600373	2011 UK_{365}	—	November 19, 2007	Mount Lemmon	Mount Lemmon Survey	·	2.0 km	MPC; JPL
600374	2011 UL_{378}	—	October 23, 2011	Mount Lemmon	Mount Lemmon Survey	·	1.6 km	MPC; JPL
600375	2011 UL_{382}	—	October 24, 2011	Mount Lemmon	Mount Lemmon Survey	·	1.4 km	MPC; JPL
600376	2011 UQ_{388}	—	January 1, 2009	Kitt Peak	Spacewatch	(2076)	790 m	MPC; JPL
600377	2011 UJ_{394}	—	October 28, 2011	Mount Lemmon	Mount Lemmon Survey	·	1.7 km	MPC; JPL
600378	2011 UM_{397}	—	October 30, 2011	Mayhill-ISON	L. Elenin	·	1.6 km	MPC; JPL
600379 Csortosgyula	2011 UY_{400}	Csortosgyula	October 18, 2011	Piszkéstető	K. Sárneczky, A. Szing	·	950 m	MPC; JPL
600380	2011 UM_{405}	—	September 20, 2011	Kitt Peak	Spacewatch	KOR	1.2 km	MPC; JPL
600381	2011 UZ_{405}	—	August 30, 2005	Anderson Mesa	LONEOS	TIR	3.7 km	MPC; JPL
600382	2011 UH_{406}	—	August 18, 2006	Kitt Peak	Spacewatch	·	1.8 km	MPC; JPL
600383	2011 UU_{406}	—	September 20, 2011	Kitt Peak	Spacewatch	TIN	1.3 km	MPC; JPL
600384	2011 UK_{407}	—	October 3, 2011	Piszkés-tető	K. Sárneczky, S. Kürti	·	3.1 km	MPC; JPL
600385	2011 UV_{416}	—	October 24, 2011	Haleakala	Pan-STARRS 1	·	1.5 km	MPC; JPL
600386	2011 UG_{418}	—	October 23, 2011	Mount Lemmon	Mount Lemmon Survey	·	1.9 km	MPC; JPL
600387	2011 UH_{421}	—	March 7, 2013	Kitt Peak	Spacewatch	·	520 m	MPC; JPL
600388	2011 UW_{421}	—	October 23, 2011	Haleakala	Pan-STARRS 1	EUP	2.5 km	MPC; JPL
600389	2011 UM_{422}	—	October 19, 2011	Haleakala	Pan-STARRS 1	·	1.7 km	MPC; JPL
600390	2011 UL_{431}	—	October 18, 2011	Mount Lemmon	Mount Lemmon Survey	GEF	750 m	MPC; JPL
600391	2011 UY_{433}	—	April 10, 2014	Haleakala	Pan-STARRS 1	·	1.7 km	MPC; JPL
600392	2011 UA_{434}	—	January 17, 2013	Haleakala	Pan-STARRS 1	·	1.7 km	MPC; JPL
600393	2011 UB_{435}	—	October 25, 2011	Haleakala	Pan-STARRS 1	·	1.1 km	MPC; JPL
600394	2011 UZ_{444}	—	September 11, 2016	Mount Lemmon	Mount Lemmon Survey	·	1.8 km	MPC; JPL
600395	2011 UT_{445}	—	April 11, 2013	Kitt Peak	Spacewatch	NYS	1.0 km	MPC; JPL
600396	2011 UR_{448}	—	October 26, 2011	Haleakala	Pan-STARRS 1	·	1.4 km	MPC; JPL
600397	2011 UV_{448}	—	October 20, 2011	Mount Lemmon	Mount Lemmon Survey	EOS	1.3 km	MPC; JPL
600398	2011 UV_{449}	—	October 23, 2011	Haleakala	Pan-STARRS 1	·	2.7 km	MPC; JPL
600399	2011 UQ_{451}	—	October 18, 2011	Kitt Peak	Spacewatch	·	2.7 km	MPC; JPL
600400	2011 UK_{454}	—	October 26, 2011	Haleakala	Pan-STARRS 1	EOS	1.4 km	MPC; JPL

== 600401–600500 ==
back to top

Designation			Discovery			Properties		Ref
Permanent	Provisional	Named after	Date	Site	Discoverer(s)	Category	Diam.	Ref
600401	2011 US_{454}	—	October 30, 2011	Mount Lemmon	Mount Lemmon Survey	KOR	1.2 km	MPC; JPL
600402	2011 UX_{454}	—	October 31, 2011	Mount Lemmon	Mount Lemmon Survey	·	1.5 km	MPC; JPL
600403	2011 UG_{455}	—	October 26, 2011	Haleakala	Pan-STARRS 1	·	1.8 km	MPC; JPL
600404	2011 UJ_{458}	—	October 23, 2011	Mount Lemmon	Mount Lemmon Survey	·	1.6 km	MPC; JPL
600405	2011 UW_{463}	—	October 21, 2011	Mount Lemmon	Mount Lemmon Survey	·	1.7 km	MPC; JPL
600406	2011 UQ_{465}	—	October 19, 2011	Mount Lemmon	Mount Lemmon Survey	·	1.5 km	MPC; JPL
600407	2011 UM_{468}	—	October 23, 2011	Mount Lemmon	Mount Lemmon Survey	·	870 m	MPC; JPL
600408	2011 UU_{469}	—	October 23, 2011	Haleakala	Pan-STARRS 1	NAE	1.7 km	MPC; JPL
600409	2011 UX_{472}	—	October 23, 2011	Haleakala	Pan-STARRS 1	·	1.7 km	MPC; JPL
600410	2011 UJ_{473}	—	October 20, 2011	Mount Lemmon	Mount Lemmon Survey	KOR	1.0 km	MPC; JPL
600411	2011 UR_{474}	—	October 24, 2011	Haleakala	Pan-STARRS 1	NAE	1.8 km	MPC; JPL
600412	2011 UA_{479}	—	October 21, 2011	Mount Lemmon	Mount Lemmon Survey	EOS	1.6 km	MPC; JPL
600413	2011 UX_{479}	—	October 25, 2011	Haleakala	Pan-STARRS 1	EOS	1.4 km	MPC; JPL
600414	2011 VH_{3}	—	December 17, 2007	Mount Lemmon	Mount Lemmon Survey	·	1.2 km	MPC; JPL
600415	2011 VJ_{6}	—	October 25, 2011	Haleakala	Pan-STARRS 1	·	2.1 km	MPC; JPL
600416	2011 VF_{7}	—	September 17, 2006	Kitt Peak	Spacewatch	·	1.6 km	MPC; JPL
600417	2011 VV_{9}	—	September 17, 2006	Kitt Peak	Spacewatch	·	1.6 km	MPC; JPL
600418	2011 VH_{16}	—	October 17, 2011	Kitt Peak	Spacewatch	·	450 m	MPC; JPL
600419	2011 VC_{25}	—	November 2, 2011	Kitt Peak	Spacewatch	·	2.4 km	MPC; JPL
600420	2011 VQ_{25}	—	April 19, 2009	Kitt Peak	Spacewatch	·	2.7 km	MPC; JPL
600421	2011 VZ_{28}	—	November 1, 2011	Kitt Peak	Spacewatch	·	1.8 km	MPC; JPL
600422	2011 VN_{32}	—	November 1, 2011	Kitt Peak	Spacewatch	·	1.4 km	MPC; JPL
600423	2011 WD_{10}	—	June 30, 2000	La Silla	Barbieri, C.	·	640 m	MPC; JPL
600424	2011 WZ_{12}	—	October 26, 2011	Haleakala	Pan-STARRS 1	H	500 m	MPC; JPL
600425	2011 WV_{15}	—	November 16, 2011	Mount Lemmon	Mount Lemmon Survey	·	1.3 km	MPC; JPL
600426	2011 WK_{19}	—	November 17, 2011	Kitt Peak	Spacewatch	·	530 m	MPC; JPL
600427	2011 WW_{21}	—	November 17, 2011	Mount Lemmon	Mount Lemmon Survey	·	2.1 km	MPC; JPL
600428	2011 WE_{22}	—	November 17, 2011	Mount Lemmon	Mount Lemmon Survey	·	2.0 km	MPC; JPL
600429	2011 WC_{25}	—	November 18, 2011	Mount Lemmon	Mount Lemmon Survey	EOS	1.5 km	MPC; JPL
600430	2011 WK_{30}	—	October 24, 2011	Haleakala	Pan-STARRS 1	·	1.6 km	MPC; JPL
600431	2011 WF_{40}	—	December 3, 2007	Catalina	CSS	·	1.0 km	MPC; JPL
600432 Weöressándor	2011 WE_{41}	Weöressándor	November 24, 2011	Piszkés-tető	K. Sárneczky, G. Marton	EOS	1.4 km	MPC; JPL
600433	2011 WF_{45}	—	October 26, 2011	Haleakala	Pan-STARRS 1	·	1.7 km	MPC; JPL
600434	2011 WU_{47}	—	October 30, 2011	Mount Lemmon	Mount Lemmon Survey	·	760 m	MPC; JPL
600435	2011 WL_{65}	—	November 25, 2011	Haleakala	Pan-STARRS 1	L4	9.8 km	MPC; JPL
600436	2011 WF_{68}	—	November 17, 2011	Kitt Peak	Spacewatch	·	2.4 km	MPC; JPL
600437	2011 WG_{69}	—	October 13, 2010	Mount Lemmon	Mount Lemmon Survey	L4	8.0 km	MPC; JPL
600438	2011 WX_{70}	—	November 24, 2011	Kitt Peak	Spacewatch	·	1.9 km	MPC; JPL
600439	2011 WS_{73}	—	November 28, 2011	Wildberg	R. Apitzsch	·	980 m	MPC; JPL
600440	2011 WH_{76}	—	October 11, 2006	Palomar	NEAT	GEF	1.3 km	MPC; JPL
600441	2011 WH_{78}	—	November 23, 2011	Mount Lemmon	Mount Lemmon Survey	·	1.6 km	MPC; JPL
600442	2011 WO_{85}	—	November 24, 2011	Haleakala	Pan-STARRS 1	·	1.7 km	MPC; JPL
600443	2011 WB_{91}	—	November 11, 2007	Mount Lemmon	Mount Lemmon Survey	·	1.9 km	MPC; JPL
600444	2011 WV_{91}	—	October 26, 2011	Haleakala	Pan-STARRS 1	H	440 m	MPC; JPL
600445	2011 WL_{92}	—	January 18, 2008	Mount Lemmon	Mount Lemmon Survey	PAD	1.3 km	MPC; JPL
600446	2011 WV_{92}	—	October 25, 1995	Kitt Peak	Spacewatch	·	1.6 km	MPC; JPL
600447	2011 WO_{93}	—	November 27, 2011	Mount Lemmon	Mount Lemmon Survey	EOS	1.4 km	MPC; JPL
600448	2011 WO_{98}	—	November 9, 2004	Mauna Kea	Veillet, C.	·	640 m	MPC; JPL
600449	2011 WZ_{98}	—	March 23, 2009	Mount Lemmon	Mount Lemmon Survey	·	1.5 km	MPC; JPL
600450	2011 WB_{119}	—	November 18, 2011	Mount Lemmon	Mount Lemmon Survey	·	2.1 km	MPC; JPL
600451	2011 WS_{123}	—	November 17, 2011	Mount Lemmon	Mount Lemmon Survey	·	1.8 km	MPC; JPL
600452	2011 WG_{125}	—	November 18, 2011	Mount Lemmon	Mount Lemmon Survey	·	2.7 km	MPC; JPL
600453	2011 WL_{135}	—	November 25, 2011	Haleakala	Pan-STARRS 1	·	3.8 km	MPC; JPL
600454	2011 WU_{138}	—	September 26, 2006	Kitt Peak	Spacewatch	·	2.0 km	MPC; JPL
600455	2011 WU_{140}	—	November 18, 2011	Mount Lemmon	Mount Lemmon Survey	EOS	1.5 km	MPC; JPL
600456	2011 WY_{141}	—	October 30, 2011	Kitt Peak	Spacewatch	EOS	1.6 km	MPC; JPL
600457	2011 WT_{157}	—	January 17, 2013	Haleakala	Pan-STARRS 1	L4	7.4 km	MPC; JPL
600458	2011 WS_{160}	—	April 5, 2013	Palomar	Palomar Transient Factory	TIR	2.3 km	MPC; JPL
600459	2011 WG_{162}	—	August 29, 2014	Kitt Peak	Spacewatch	·	640 m	MPC; JPL
600460	2011 WA_{167}	—	June 5, 2014	Haleakala	Pan-STARRS 1	·	2.4 km	MPC; JPL
600461	2011 WZ_{170}	—	May 7, 2014	Haleakala	Pan-STARRS 1	·	1.6 km	MPC; JPL
600462	2011 WC_{172}	—	August 18, 2015	Kitt Peak	Spacewatch	TRE	1.8 km	MPC; JPL
600463	2011 WD_{174}	—	November 28, 2011	Mount Lemmon	Mount Lemmon Survey	L4	8.9 km	MPC; JPL
600464	2011 WE_{174}	—	November 24, 2011	Mount Lemmon	Mount Lemmon Survey	·	1.4 km	MPC; JPL
600465	2011 WO_{175}	—	November 18, 2011	Mount Lemmon	Mount Lemmon Survey	·	1.6 km	MPC; JPL
600466	2011 WQ_{176}	—	November 26, 2011	Mount Lemmon	Mount Lemmon Survey	L4	7.7 km	MPC; JPL
600467	2011 WY_{176}	—	November 24, 2011	Mount Lemmon	Mount Lemmon Survey	·	2.2 km	MPC; JPL
600468	2011 WT_{180}	—	November 18, 2011	Mount Lemmon	Mount Lemmon Survey	·	1.7 km	MPC; JPL
600469	2011 WW_{182}	—	November 19, 2011	Mount Lemmon	Mount Lemmon Survey	·	910 m	MPC; JPL
600470	2011 XH_{1}	—	November 17, 2011	Kitt Peak	Spacewatch	H	460 m	MPC; JPL
600471	2011 XX_{4}	—	February 3, 2013	Haleakala	Pan-STARRS 1	·	2.0 km	MPC; JPL
600472	2011 XV_{5}	—	December 27, 2006	Kitt Peak	Spacewatch	·	2.1 km	MPC; JPL
600473	2011 XF_{6}	—	September 23, 2015	Haleakala	Pan-STARRS 1	·	1.2 km	MPC; JPL
600474	2011 YM_{3}	—	September 3, 2010	Kitt Peak	Spacewatch	·	1.6 km	MPC; JPL
600475	2011 YN_{3}	—	November 22, 2011	Mount Lemmon	Mount Lemmon Survey	·	2.2 km	MPC; JPL
600476	2011 YV_{11}	—	December 24, 2011	Mount Lemmon	Mount Lemmon Survey	EOS	2.0 km	MPC; JPL
600477	2011 YL_{12}	—	November 28, 2011	Mount Lemmon	Mount Lemmon Survey	·	2.7 km	MPC; JPL
600478	2011 YW_{19}	—	April 30, 2008	Kitt Peak	Spacewatch	·	3.1 km	MPC; JPL
600479	2011 YC_{20}	—	December 27, 2011	Mount Lemmon	Mount Lemmon Survey	EOS	1.8 km	MPC; JPL
600480	2011 YE_{30}	—	September 17, 2010	Catalina	CSS	·	3.0 km	MPC; JPL
600481	2011 YJ_{30}	—	December 25, 2011	Kitt Peak	Spacewatch	·	710 m	MPC; JPL
600482	2011 YB_{32}	—	November 22, 2011	Mount Lemmon	Mount Lemmon Survey	H	480 m	MPC; JPL
600483	2011 YC_{33}	—	January 27, 2007	Mount Lemmon	Mount Lemmon Survey	EOS	1.9 km	MPC; JPL
600484	2011 YT_{33}	—	December 26, 2011	Kitt Peak	Spacewatch	L4	8.0 km	MPC; JPL
600485	2011 YK_{35}	—	December 26, 2011	Kitt Peak	Spacewatch	·	2.2 km	MPC; JPL
600486	2011 YF_{39}	—	April 1, 2003	Apache Point	SDSS Collaboration	L4	7.9 km	MPC; JPL
600487	2011 YP_{40}	—	December 24, 2011	Mount Lemmon	Mount Lemmon Survey	·	550 m	MPC; JPL
600488	2011 YJ_{41}	—	September 24, 2005	Kitt Peak	Spacewatch	·	2.1 km	MPC; JPL
600489	2011 YZ_{42}	—	October 4, 2006	Mount Lemmon	Mount Lemmon Survey	·	2.1 km	MPC; JPL
600490	2011 YX_{49}	—	September 19, 2010	Kitt Peak	Spacewatch	EOS	1.5 km	MPC; JPL
600491	2011 YO_{55}	—	December 29, 2011	Kitt Peak	Spacewatch	·	2.4 km	MPC; JPL
600492	2011 YM_{56}	—	October 1, 2008	Mount Lemmon	Mount Lemmon Survey	L4	6.5 km	MPC; JPL
600493	2011 YX_{66}	—	February 22, 2007	Kitt Peak	Spacewatch	EMA	2.2 km	MPC; JPL
600494	2011 YL_{71}	—	November 28, 2011	Mount Lemmon	Mount Lemmon Survey	·	3.8 km	MPC; JPL
600495	2011 YJ_{73}	—	November 24, 2011	Haleakala	Pan-STARRS 1	·	2.0 km	MPC; JPL
600496	2011 YN_{73}	—	November 13, 2010	Mount Lemmon	Mount Lemmon Survey	L4	6.9 km	MPC; JPL
600497	2011 YJ_{81}	—	December 28, 2011	Kitt Peak	Spacewatch	·	3.4 km	MPC; JPL
600498	2011 YM_{81}	—	March 4, 2013	Haleakala	Pan-STARRS 1	TIR	2.3 km	MPC; JPL
600499	2011 YW_{81}	—	April 16, 2013	Kitt Peak	Spacewatch	·	3.4 km	MPC; JPL
600500	2011 YF_{82}	—	December 25, 2011	Kitt Peak	Spacewatch	·	2.0 km	MPC; JPL

== 600501–600600 ==
back to top

Designation			Discovery			Properties		Ref
Permanent	Provisional	Named after	Date	Site	Discoverer(s)	Category	Diam.	Ref
600501	2011 YR_{82}	—	December 27, 2011	Kitt Peak	Spacewatch	·	2.7 km	MPC; JPL
600502	2011 YQ_{83}	—	July 19, 2015	Haleakala	Pan-STARRS 1	EOS	1.8 km	MPC; JPL
600503	2011 YY_{83}	—	December 29, 2011	Mount Lemmon	Mount Lemmon Survey	·	2.9 km	MPC; JPL
600504	2011 YF_{87}	—	December 27, 2011	Catalina	CSS	·	1.9 km	MPC; JPL
600505	2011 YC_{89}	—	December 29, 2011	Mount Lemmon	Mount Lemmon Survey	·	1.5 km	MPC; JPL
600506	2011 YW_{89}	—	December 31, 2011	Mount Lemmon	Mount Lemmon Survey	L4	7.7 km	MPC; JPL
600507	2011 YE_{91}	—	December 29, 2011	Mount Lemmon	Mount Lemmon Survey	L4	6.7 km	MPC; JPL
600508	2011 YG_{93}	—	December 27, 2011	Kitt Peak	Spacewatch	L4	7.4 km	MPC; JPL
600509	2011 YD_{94}	—	December 25, 2011	Kitt Peak	Spacewatch	EOS	1.4 km	MPC; JPL
600510	2012 AO_{2}	—	January 2, 2012	Mount Lemmon	Mount Lemmon Survey	·	2.3 km	MPC; JPL
600511	2012 AJ_{3}	—	January 1, 2012	Mount Lemmon	Mount Lemmon Survey	·	510 m	MPC; JPL
600512	2012 AC_{9}	—	January 2, 2012	Kitt Peak	Spacewatch	·	3.0 km	MPC; JPL
600513	2012 AZ_{14}	—	January 14, 2012	Kitt Peak	Spacewatch	·	2.3 km	MPC; JPL
600514	2012 AZ_{15}	—	December 7, 2005	Kitt Peak	Spacewatch	·	2.3 km	MPC; JPL
600515	2012 AK_{18}	—	December 28, 2011	Mount Lemmon	Mount Lemmon Survey	L4	7.7 km	MPC; JPL
600516	2012 AA_{19}	—	January 14, 2012	Catalina	CSS	·	1.7 km	MPC; JPL
600517	2012 AS_{19}	—	September 19, 2003	Palomar	NEAT	·	1.7 km	MPC; JPL
600518	2012 AG_{23}	—	January 2, 2012	Mount Lemmon	Mount Lemmon Survey	L4	8.7 km	MPC; JPL
600519	2012 AV_{23}	—	February 7, 2002	Palomar	NEAT	EOS	2.1 km	MPC; JPL
600520	2012 AJ_{26}	—	May 28, 2014	Haleakala	Pan-STARRS 1	·	2.5 km	MPC; JPL
600521	2012 AS_{26}	—	January 7, 2016	Haleakala	Pan-STARRS 1	·	870 m	MPC; JPL
600522	2012 AQ_{27}	—	November 4, 2016	Haleakala	Pan-STARRS 1	·	2.3 km	MPC; JPL
600523	2012 AN_{29}	—	October 12, 2016	Haleakala	Pan-STARRS 1	·	2.1 km	MPC; JPL
600524	2012 AT_{29}	—	January 14, 2018	Mount Lemmon	Mount Lemmon Survey	·	2.1 km	MPC; JPL
600525	2012 AK_{30}	—	January 2, 2012	Kitt Peak	Spacewatch	·	950 m	MPC; JPL
600526	2012 AH_{31}	—	January 1, 2012	Mount Lemmon	Mount Lemmon Survey	L4	6.1 km	MPC; JPL
600527	2012 AP_{33}	—	January 2, 2012	Mount Lemmon	Mount Lemmon Survey	L4	7.4 km	MPC; JPL
600528	2012 AY_{34}	—	January 1, 2012	Mount Lemmon	Mount Lemmon Survey	·	980 m	MPC; JPL
600529	2012 AK_{35}	—	January 2, 2012	Kitt Peak	Spacewatch	·	520 m	MPC; JPL
600530	2012 AR_{35}	—	January 1, 2012	Mount Lemmon	Mount Lemmon Survey	·	2.3 km	MPC; JPL
600531	2012 BC_{2}	—	December 27, 2011	Mount Lemmon	Mount Lemmon Survey	·	2.8 km	MPC; JPL
600532	2012 BZ_{9}	—	January 18, 2012	Kitt Peak	Spacewatch	H	490 m	MPC; JPL
600533	2012 BY_{13}	—	July 13, 2001	Palomar	NEAT	·	1.3 km	MPC; JPL
600534	2012 BM_{14}	—	January 17, 2012	Les Engarouines	L. Bernasconi	PHO	750 m	MPC; JPL
600535	2012 BA_{16}	—	September 10, 2007	Catalina	CSS	·	800 m	MPC; JPL
600536	2012 BL_{20}	—	March 19, 2009	Calar Alto	F. Hormuth	·	1.5 km	MPC; JPL
600537	2012 BM_{23}	—	January 20, 2012	Mount Lemmon	Mount Lemmon Survey	·	590 m	MPC; JPL
600538	2012 BM_{24}	—	July 10, 2005	Catalina	CSS	H	820 m	MPC; JPL
600539 Aldoatiglio	2012 BZ_{24}	Aldoatiglio	January 20, 2012	Mayhill	Falla, N.	·	1.1 km	MPC; JPL
600540	2012 BU_{28}	—	November 15, 2010	Mount Lemmon	Mount Lemmon Survey	·	3.9 km	MPC; JPL
600541	2012 BM_{33}	—	January 10, 2007	Kitt Peak	Spacewatch	·	1.6 km	MPC; JPL
600542	2012 BH_{36}	—	January 4, 2012	Mount Lemmon	Mount Lemmon Survey	·	2.3 km	MPC; JPL
600543	2012 BD_{38}	—	January 19, 2012	Mount Lemmon	Mount Lemmon Survey	·	2.5 km	MPC; JPL
600544	2012 BW_{41}	—	January 19, 2012	Mount Lemmon	Mount Lemmon Survey	EOS	1.4 km	MPC; JPL
600545	2012 BG_{45}	—	January 2, 2012	Kitt Peak	Spacewatch	·	830 m	MPC; JPL
600546	2012 BH_{51}	—	January 20, 2012	Haleakala	Pan-STARRS 1	·	2.7 km	MPC; JPL
600547	2012 BH_{59}	—	January 3, 2012	Kitt Peak	Spacewatch	ELF	3.5 km	MPC; JPL
600548	2012 BJ_{60}	—	October 26, 2009	Mount Lemmon	Mount Lemmon Survey	L4	9.8 km	MPC; JPL
600549	2012 BT_{60}	—	January 24, 2012	Haleakala	Pan-STARRS 1	L4 · HEK	7.0 km	MPC; JPL
600550	2012 BC_{63}	—	January 4, 2012	Mount Lemmon	Mount Lemmon Survey	·	2.6 km	MPC; JPL
600551	2012 BO_{64}	—	January 20, 2012	Mount Lemmon	Mount Lemmon Survey	L4	7.2 km	MPC; JPL
600552	2012 BD_{66}	—	January 2, 2012	Mount Lemmon	Mount Lemmon Survey	·	1.9 km	MPC; JPL
600553	2012 BE_{70}	—	January 21, 2012	Kitt Peak	Spacewatch	·	2.7 km	MPC; JPL
600554	2012 BF_{71}	—	January 21, 2012	Kitt Peak	Spacewatch	PHO	680 m	MPC; JPL
600555	2012 BH_{75}	—	January 2, 2012	Kitt Peak	Spacewatch	VER	2.5 km	MPC; JPL
600556	2012 BB_{79}	—	December 18, 2011	ESA OGS	ESA OGS	L4	8.7 km	MPC; JPL
600557	2012 BC_{95}	—	February 25, 2007	Kitt Peak	Spacewatch	·	2.7 km	MPC; JPL
600558	2012 BQ_{96}	—	December 29, 2011	Mount Lemmon	Mount Lemmon Survey	L4	7.5 km	MPC; JPL
600559	2012 BW_{106}	—	January 18, 2012	Kitt Peak	Spacewatch	THB	3.0 km	MPC; JPL
600560	2012 BY_{107}	—	January 26, 2012	Haleakala	Pan-STARRS 1	·	2.4 km	MPC; JPL
600561	2012 BZ_{119}	—	September 3, 2010	Mount Lemmon	Mount Lemmon Survey	·	3.0 km	MPC; JPL
600562	2012 BF_{121}	—	January 23, 2006	Mount Lemmon	Mount Lemmon Survey	·	2.6 km	MPC; JPL
600563	2012 BR_{121}	—	January 30, 2012	Kitt Peak	Spacewatch	·	2.5 km	MPC; JPL
600564	2012 BC_{123}	—	January 21, 2012	Kitt Peak	Spacewatch	L4	7.5 km	MPC; JPL
600565	2012 BJ_{124}	—	November 1, 2007	Mount Lemmon	Mount Lemmon Survey	·	630 m	MPC; JPL
600566	2012 BY_{125}	—	January 1, 2012	Mount Lemmon	Mount Lemmon Survey	EUP	3.0 km	MPC; JPL
600567	2012 BG_{131}	—	August 5, 2005	Palomar	NEAT	H	530 m	MPC; JPL
600568	2012 BY_{132}	—	May 3, 2005	Kitt Peak	D. E. Trilling, A. S. Rivkin	PHO	940 m	MPC; JPL
600569	2012 BU_{133}	—	December 25, 2011	Mount Lemmon	Mount Lemmon Survey	PHO	760 m	MPC; JPL
600570	2012 BP_{136}	—	December 28, 2011	Les Engarouines	L. Bernasconi	·	930 m	MPC; JPL
600571	2012 BB_{138}	—	April 28, 2008	Mount Lemmon	Mount Lemmon Survey	·	2.8 km	MPC; JPL
600572	2012 BB_{140}	—	May 1, 2003	Kitt Peak	Spacewatch	·	1.8 km	MPC; JPL
600573	2012 BF_{145}	—	January 26, 2012	Mount Lemmon	Mount Lemmon Survey	·	740 m	MPC; JPL
600574	2012 BT_{146}	—	December 31, 2011	Kitt Peak	Spacewatch	·	2.7 km	MPC; JPL
600575	2012 BD_{147}	—	December 1, 2005	Kitt Peak	Spacewatch	(159)	2.1 km	MPC; JPL
600576	2012 BH_{147}	—	May 17, 2009	Kitt Peak	Spacewatch	V	550 m	MPC; JPL
600577	2012 BZ_{148}	—	May 12, 2005	Mount Lemmon	Mount Lemmon Survey	NYS	1.1 km	MPC; JPL
600578	2012 BT_{152}	—	January 29, 2012	Catalina	CSS	URS	4.1 km	MPC; JPL
600579	2012 BD_{155}	—	November 3, 2010	Kitt Peak	Spacewatch	L4	7.1 km	MPC; JPL
600580	2012 BX_{155}	—	January 19, 2012	Haleakala	Pan-STARRS 1	H	350 m	MPC; JPL
600581	2012 BT_{157}	—	January 19, 2012	Haleakala	Pan-STARRS 1	·	1.9 km	MPC; JPL
600582	2012 BJ_{159}	—	January 29, 2012	Kitt Peak	Spacewatch	·	700 m	MPC; JPL
600583	2012 BZ_{160}	—	November 24, 2016	Kitt Peak	Spacewatch	·	3.9 km	MPC; JPL
600584	2012 BD_{161}	—	August 3, 2014	Haleakala	Pan-STARRS 1	·	1.8 km	MPC; JPL
600585	2012 BF_{161}	—	January 26, 2012	Haleakala	Pan-STARRS 1	ELF	3.4 km	MPC; JPL
600586	2012 BG_{161}	—	April 10, 2013	Haleakala	Pan-STARRS 1	·	2.1 km	MPC; JPL
600587	2012 BO_{161}	—	January 19, 2012	Kitt Peak	Spacewatch	TIR	2.5 km	MPC; JPL
600588	2012 BU_{164}	—	January 26, 2012	Haleakala	Pan-STARRS 1	·	2.8 km	MPC; JPL
600589	2012 BM_{166}	—	June 29, 2014	Haleakala	Pan-STARRS 1	·	2.8 km	MPC; JPL
600590	2012 BE_{167}	—	April 13, 2013	Haleakala	Pan-STARRS 1	·	2.3 km	MPC; JPL
600591	2012 BG_{167}	—	September 23, 2015	Haleakala	Pan-STARRS 1	VER	2.3 km	MPC; JPL
600592	2012 BK_{167}	—	July 26, 2015	Haleakala	Pan-STARRS 1	·	2.5 km	MPC; JPL
600593	2012 BG_{168}	—	January 15, 2018	Haleakala	Pan-STARRS 1	·	2.5 km	MPC; JPL
600594	2012 BD_{169}	—	January 19, 2012	Mount Lemmon	Mount Lemmon Survey	·	2.3 km	MPC; JPL
600595	2012 BO_{171}	—	January 14, 2018	Mount Lemmon	Mount Lemmon Survey	·	2.4 km	MPC; JPL
600596	2012 BW_{171}	—	January 16, 2018	Haleakala	Pan-STARRS 1	HYG	2.1 km	MPC; JPL
600597	2012 BG_{173}	—	January 18, 2012	Mount Lemmon	Mount Lemmon Survey	·	890 m	MPC; JPL
600598	2012 BS_{173}	—	October 6, 2008	Mount Lemmon	Mount Lemmon Survey	L4 · ERY	6.4 km	MPC; JPL
600599	2012 BC_{175}	—	January 26, 2012	Kitt Peak	Spacewatch	·	500 m	MPC; JPL
600600	2012 BM_{175}	—	January 19, 2012	Kitt Peak	Spacewatch	·	2.2 km	MPC; JPL

== 600601–600700 ==
back to top

Designation			Discovery			Properties		Ref
Permanent	Provisional	Named after	Date	Site	Discoverer(s)	Category	Diam.	Ref
600601	2012 BN_{175}	—	January 26, 2012	Mount Lemmon	Mount Lemmon Survey	PHO	560 m	MPC; JPL
600602	2012 BA_{176}	—	January 19, 2012	Haleakala	Pan-STARRS 1	·	2.5 km	MPC; JPL
600603	2012 BM_{176}	—	January 27, 2012	Mount Lemmon	Mount Lemmon Survey	·	2.5 km	MPC; JPL
600604	2012 BK_{178}	—	January 27, 2012	Mount Lemmon	Mount Lemmon Survey	EOS	1.5 km	MPC; JPL
600605	2012 BO_{180}	—	January 18, 2012	Mount Lemmon	Mount Lemmon Survey	L4	7.1 km	MPC; JPL
600606	2012 BV_{180}	—	January 20, 2012	Kitt Peak	Spacewatch	·	2.0 km	MPC; JPL
600607	2012 BF_{183}	—	January 29, 2012	Kitt Peak	Spacewatch	·	2.2 km	MPC; JPL
600608	2012 CS_{14}	—	September 8, 1997	Caussols	ODAS	·	4.2 km	MPC; JPL
600609	2012 CC_{15}	—	February 3, 2012	Haleakala	Pan-STARRS 1	·	810 m	MPC; JPL
600610	2012 CF_{18}	—	September 24, 2008	Kitt Peak	Spacewatch	L4	5.9 km	MPC; JPL
600611	2012 CP_{20}	—	October 9, 2007	Kitt Peak	Spacewatch	·	590 m	MPC; JPL
600612	2012 CR_{20}	—	October 15, 2004	Mount Lemmon	Mount Lemmon Survey	·	550 m	MPC; JPL
600613	2012 CZ_{20}	—	October 24, 2005	Palomar	NEAT	H	630 m	MPC; JPL
600614	2012 CO_{21}	—	January 25, 2012	Haleakala	Pan-STARRS 1	·	2.4 km	MPC; JPL
600615	2012 CN_{24}	—	December 18, 2004	Mount Lemmon	Mount Lemmon Survey	V	720 m	MPC; JPL
600616	2012 CU_{29}	—	October 1, 2010	Mount Lemmon	Mount Lemmon Survey	·	690 m	MPC; JPL
600617	2012 CR_{30}	—	March 16, 2001	Kitt Peak	Spacewatch	·	1.0 km	MPC; JPL
600618	2012 CQ_{34}	—	November 12, 2010	Mount Lemmon	Mount Lemmon Survey	·	2.5 km	MPC; JPL
600619	2012 CY_{35}	—	February 3, 2012	Haleakala	Pan-STARRS 1	·	2.7 km	MPC; JPL
600620	2012 CZ_{35}	—	January 21, 2012	Kitt Peak	Spacewatch	·	2.4 km	MPC; JPL
600621	2012 CW_{37}	—	December 30, 2005	Kitt Peak	Spacewatch	·	3.0 km	MPC; JPL
600622	2012 CX_{39}	—	February 3, 2012	Haleakala	Pan-STARRS 1	EOS	1.7 km	MPC; JPL
600623	2012 CL_{40}	—	September 30, 2003	Kitt Peak	Spacewatch	·	3.2 km	MPC; JPL
600624	2012 CF_{50}	—	February 13, 2012	Haleakala	Pan-STARRS 1	·	2.5 km	MPC; JPL
600625	2012 CF_{53}	—	March 25, 2007	Mount Lemmon	Mount Lemmon Survey	·	2.1 km	MPC; JPL
600626	2012 CH_{53}	—	September 5, 2000	Apache Point	SDSS Collaboration	·	950 m	MPC; JPL
600627	2012 CE_{60}	—	February 3, 2012	Mount Lemmon	Mount Lemmon Survey	·	530 m	MPC; JPL
600628	2012 CR_{61}	—	February 3, 2012	Haleakala	Pan-STARRS 1	·	2.6 km	MPC; JPL
600629	2012 CN_{62}	—	February 15, 2012	Haleakala	Pan-STARRS 1	MAS	520 m	MPC; JPL
600630	2012 CF_{63}	—	February 1, 2012	Mount Lemmon	Mount Lemmon Survey	·	2.4 km	MPC; JPL
600631	2012 CC_{67}	—	February 3, 2012	Haleakala	Pan-STARRS 1	·	2.3 km	MPC; JPL
600632	2012 CR_{67}	—	February 3, 2012	Mount Lemmon	Mount Lemmon Survey	·	2.9 km	MPC; JPL
600633	2012 CC_{71}	—	February 14, 2012	Haleakala	Pan-STARRS 1	·	2.6 km	MPC; JPL
600634	2012 DD	—	January 21, 2012	Haleakala	Pan-STARRS 1	H	390 m	MPC; JPL
600635	2012 DH_{6}	—	March 13, 2007	Kitt Peak	Spacewatch	·	2.7 km	MPC; JPL
600636	2012 DE_{9}	—	March 4, 2005	Mount Lemmon	Mount Lemmon Survey	·	560 m	MPC; JPL
600637	2012 DX_{12}	—	January 19, 2012	Haleakala	Pan-STARRS 1	·	730 m	MPC; JPL
600638	2012 DS_{14}	—	September 14, 2010	Kitt Peak	Spacewatch	PHO	970 m	MPC; JPL
600639 Gevreychambertin	2012 DQ_{15}	Gevreychambertin	February 21, 2012	Oukaïmeden	M. Ory	VER	2.5 km	MPC; JPL
600640	2012 DO_{17}	—	February 22, 2012	Kitt Peak	Spacewatch	NYS	1.0 km	MPC; JPL
600641	2012 DK_{18}	—	January 20, 2012	Kitt Peak	Spacewatch	EOS	1.9 km	MPC; JPL
600642	2012 DL_{18}	—	August 1, 2009	Kitt Peak	Spacewatch	·	2.9 km	MPC; JPL
600643	2012 DH_{19}	—	December 25, 2011	Mount Lemmon	Mount Lemmon Survey	·	1.1 km	MPC; JPL
600644	2012 DV_{22}	—	February 21, 2012	Kitt Peak	Spacewatch	(69559)	2.4 km	MPC; JPL
600645	2012 DN_{23}	—	March 10, 2005	Mount Lemmon	Mount Lemmon Survey	NYS	790 m	MPC; JPL
600646	2012 DN_{25}	—	February 21, 2012	Kitt Peak	Spacewatch	·	1.0 km	MPC; JPL
600647	2012 DY_{26}	—	December 31, 2000	Haleakala	NEAT	·	2.4 km	MPC; JPL
600648	2012 DD_{35}	—	September 30, 2010	Mount Lemmon	Mount Lemmon Survey	·	700 m	MPC; JPL
600649	2012 DM_{38}	—	October 7, 2005	Mauna Kea	A. Boattini	T_{j} (2.97)	3.6 km	MPC; JPL
600650	2012 DZ_{39}	—	March 22, 2001	Kitt Peak	Spacewatch	·	1.5 km	MPC; JPL
600651	2012 DG_{43}	—	December 13, 1999	Kitt Peak	Spacewatch	·	2.7 km	MPC; JPL
600652	2012 DA_{51}	—	February 26, 2012	Mount Lemmon	Mount Lemmon Survey	·	550 m	MPC; JPL
600653	2012 DS_{56}	—	August 13, 2010	Kitt Peak	Spacewatch	·	680 m	MPC; JPL
600654	2012 DQ_{58}	—	February 26, 2012	Haleakala	Pan-STARRS 1	·	900 m	MPC; JPL
600655	2012 DO_{62}	—	January 8, 2006	Catalina	CSS	·	3.9 km	MPC; JPL
600656	2012 DE_{64}	—	January 30, 2012	Kitt Peak	Spacewatch	·	2.4 km	MPC; JPL
600657	2012 DW_{67}	—	January 27, 2012	Mount Lemmon	Mount Lemmon Survey	·	2.0 km	MPC; JPL
600658	2012 DM_{73}	—	February 11, 2004	Kitt Peak	Spacewatch	·	1.2 km	MPC; JPL
600659	2012 DD_{74}	—	January 15, 2004	Kitt Peak	Spacewatch	MAS	760 m	MPC; JPL
600660	2012 DM_{81}	—	March 16, 2001	Kitt Peak	Spacewatch	·	1.0 km	MPC; JPL
600661	2012 DG_{101}	—	February 26, 2012	Haleakala	Pan-STARRS 1	·	2.7 km	MPC; JPL
600662	2012 DX_{104}	—	February 27, 2012	Haleakala	Pan-STARRS 1	·	2.0 km	MPC; JPL
600663	2012 DT_{106}	—	February 21, 2012	Kitt Peak	Spacewatch	·	590 m	MPC; JPL
600664	2012 DB_{108}	—	January 10, 2006	Kitt Peak	Spacewatch	·	2.5 km	MPC; JPL
600665 Nuitsaintgeorges	2012 DD_{115}	Nuitsaintgeorges	February 21, 2012	Oukaïmeden	M. Ory	·	2.9 km	MPC; JPL
600666	2012 DO_{116}	—	February 28, 2012	Haleakala	Pan-STARRS 1	·	1.0 km	MPC; JPL
600667	2012 DE_{117}	—	February 23, 2012	Mount Lemmon	Mount Lemmon Survey	·	740 m	MPC; JPL
600668	2012 DP_{118}	—	February 27, 2012	Haleakala	Pan-STARRS 1	·	1.1 km	MPC; JPL
600669	2012 DM_{119}	—	February 27, 2012	Haleakala	Pan-STARRS 1	·	2.8 km	MPC; JPL
600670	2012 DB_{121}	—	February 28, 2012	Haleakala	Pan-STARRS 1	·	620 m	MPC; JPL
600671	2012 DZ_{124}	—	February 26, 2012	Kitt Peak	Spacewatch	EOS	1.4 km	MPC; JPL
600672	2012 DP_{126}	—	February 28, 2012	Haleakala	Pan-STARRS 1	·	2.4 km	MPC; JPL
600673	2012 EM_{6}	—	October 19, 2003	Apache Point	SDSS	V	540 m	MPC; JPL
600674	2012 EE_{10}	—	March 14, 2012	Haleakala	Pan-STARRS 1	H	370 m	MPC; JPL
600675	2012 EF_{12}	—	November 10, 2010	Mount Lemmon	Mount Lemmon Survey	·	790 m	MPC; JPL
600676	2012 EL_{14}	—	March 15, 2012	Mount Lemmon	Mount Lemmon Survey	3:2	4.5 km	MPC; JPL
600677	2012 EY_{14}	—	February 25, 2012	Mount Graham	Boyle, R. P., V. Laugalys	·	2.7 km	MPC; JPL
600678	2012 EB_{16}	—	November 8, 2007	Mount Lemmon	Mount Lemmon Survey	·	1.3 km	MPC; JPL
600679	2012 EN_{18}	—	October 9, 2010	Mount Lemmon	Mount Lemmon Survey	H	550 m	MPC; JPL
600680	2012 ER_{18}	—	September 12, 2005	Kitt Peak	Spacewatch	H	470 m	MPC; JPL
600681	2012 ES_{18}	—	March 14, 2012	Catalina	CSS	H	410 m	MPC; JPL
600682	2012 EE_{19}	—	September 16, 2009	Mount Lemmon	Mount Lemmon Survey	·	2.4 km	MPC; JPL
600683	2012 EL_{20}	—	September 19, 1998	Apache Point	SDSS	·	1.0 km	MPC; JPL
600684	2012 EW_{22}	—	August 27, 2014	Haleakala	Pan-STARRS 1	·	2.5 km	MPC; JPL
600685	2012 EU_{27}	—	March 13, 2012	Haleakala	Pan-STARRS 1	·	3.1 km	MPC; JPL
600686	2012 FM_{6}	—	November 4, 2004	Kitt Peak	Spacewatch	·	640 m	MPC; JPL
600687	2012 FB_{8}	—	September 5, 2010	Mount Lemmon	Mount Lemmon Survey	·	710 m	MPC; JPL
600688	2012 FW_{8}	—	February 16, 2012	Haleakala	Pan-STARRS 1	LIX	2.7 km	MPC; JPL
600689	2012 FU_{14}	—	January 7, 2006	Kitt Peak	Spacewatch	(31811)	2.8 km	MPC; JPL
600690	2012 FP_{29}	—	March 1, 2008	Kitt Peak	Spacewatch	·	1.3 km	MPC; JPL
600691	2012 FO_{30}	—	April 12, 2004	Kitt Peak	Spacewatch	H	590 m	MPC; JPL
600692	2012 FB_{31}	—	December 4, 2011	Haleakala	Pan-STARRS 1	·	2.7 km	MPC; JPL
600693	2012 FF_{32}	—	March 22, 2012	Mount Lemmon	Mount Lemmon Survey	·	690 m	MPC; JPL
600694	2012 FU_{37}	—	February 20, 2006	Mount Lemmon	Mount Lemmon Survey	·	3.1 km	MPC; JPL
600695	2012 FP_{39}	—	February 27, 2012	Haleakala	Pan-STARRS 1	·	900 m	MPC; JPL
600696	2012 FG_{45}	—	March 17, 2012	Mount Lemmon	Mount Lemmon Survey	·	1.5 km	MPC; JPL
600697	2012 FB_{50}	—	March 15, 2012	Mount Lemmon	Mount Lemmon Survey	·	930 m	MPC; JPL
600698	2012 FU_{51}	—	December 4, 2007	Kitt Peak	Spacewatch	NYS	840 m	MPC; JPL
600699	2012 FJ_{52}	—	September 30, 2005	Catalina	CSS	H	560 m	MPC; JPL
600700	2012 FL_{53}	—	March 22, 2012	Mount Lemmon	Mount Lemmon Survey	·	2.5 km	MPC; JPL

== 600701–600800 ==
back to top

Designation			Discovery			Properties		Ref
Permanent	Provisional	Named after	Date	Site	Discoverer(s)	Category	Diam.	Ref
600701	2012 FU_{57}	—	April 1, 2008	Kitt Peak	Spacewatch	·	780 m	MPC; JPL
600702	2012 FZ_{63}	—	February 28, 2012	Haleakala	Pan-STARRS 1	·	820 m	MPC; JPL
600703	2012 FE_{76}	—	July 23, 2003	Palomar	NEAT	·	3.6 km	MPC; JPL
600704	2012 FF_{79}	—	August 27, 2009	Kitt Peak	Spacewatch	·	2.4 km	MPC; JPL
600705	2012 FV_{80}	—	February 1, 2012	Mount Lemmon	Mount Lemmon Survey	PHO	720 m	MPC; JPL
600706	2012 FD_{81}	—	March 26, 2012	Mount Lemmon	Mount Lemmon Survey	H	520 m	MPC; JPL
600707	2012 FZ_{90}	—	March 26, 2012	Mount Lemmon	Mount Lemmon Survey	·	2.5 km	MPC; JPL
600708	2012 FG_{101}	—	March 30, 2012	Mount Lemmon	Mount Lemmon Survey	THM	2.1 km	MPC; JPL
600709	2012 FS_{103}	—	March 25, 2012	Catalina	CSS	·	3.0 km	MPC; JPL
600710	2012 FO_{107}	—	March 28, 2012	Mount Lemmon	Mount Lemmon Survey	·	860 m	MPC; JPL
600711	2012 GO_{1}	—	September 20, 2006	Catalina	CSS	·	990 m	MPC; JPL
600712	2012 GM_{4}	—	February 24, 2012	Mayhill-ISON	L. Elenin	PHO	790 m	MPC; JPL
600713	2012 GZ_{11}	—	March 27, 2012	Mount Lemmon	Mount Lemmon Survey	H	380 m	MPC; JPL
600714	2012 GH_{12}	—	April 12, 2012	Catalina	CSS	H	570 m	MPC; JPL
600715	2012 GJ_{13}	—	April 2, 2005	Kitt Peak	Spacewatch	·	720 m	MPC; JPL
600716	2012 GD_{16}	—	March 27, 2012	Haleakala	Pan-STARRS 1	PHO	650 m	MPC; JPL
600717	2012 GS_{23}	—	October 16, 2006	Catalina	CSS	·	1.3 km	MPC; JPL
600718	2012 GC_{27}	—	April 15, 2012	Haleakala	Pan-STARRS 1	·	2.7 km	MPC; JPL
600719	2012 GA_{29}	—	September 30, 2002	Haleakala	NEAT	H	620 m	MPC; JPL
600720	2012 GK_{30}	—	April 22, 2007	Mount Lemmon	Mount Lemmon Survey	·	4.1 km	MPC; JPL
600721	2012 GM_{31}	—	March 28, 2012	Kitt Peak	Spacewatch	·	540 m	MPC; JPL
600722	2012 GP_{39}	—	May 4, 2005	Palomar	NEAT	·	1.1 km	MPC; JPL
600723	2012 GO_{40}	—	January 20, 2009	Catalina	CSS	H	550 m	MPC; JPL
600724	2012 GD_{42}	—	April 13, 2012	Kitt Peak	Spacewatch	·	540 m	MPC; JPL
600725	2012 HG	—	April 16, 2012	Socorro	LINEAR	·	1.4 km	MPC; JPL
600726	2012 HZ_{1}	—	October 24, 2005	Kitt Peak	Spacewatch	H	320 m	MPC; JPL
600727	2012 HG_{5}	—	February 7, 2008	Mount Lemmon	Mount Lemmon Survey	·	990 m	MPC; JPL
600728	2012 HT_{6}	—	April 11, 2012	Mount Lemmon	Mount Lemmon Survey	·	570 m	MPC; JPL
600729	2012 HL_{9}	—	February 29, 2008	Kitt Peak	Spacewatch	·	1.2 km	MPC; JPL
600730	2012 HX_{10}	—	April 20, 2012	Mount Lemmon	Mount Lemmon Survey	(2076)	660 m	MPC; JPL
600731	2012 HY_{13}	—	April 23, 2012	Mount Lemmon	Mount Lemmon Survey	H	370 m	MPC; JPL
600732	2012 HJ_{14}	—	March 31, 2012	Mount Lemmon	Mount Lemmon Survey	·	1.1 km	MPC; JPL
600733	2012 HJ_{15}	—	September 15, 2009	Kitt Peak	Spacewatch	·	1.3 km	MPC; JPL
600734	2012 HH_{16}	—	September 2, 2010	Mount Lemmon	Mount Lemmon Survey	H	520 m	MPC; JPL
600735	2012 HO_{25}	—	April 21, 2012	Catalina	CSS	·	840 m	MPC; JPL
600736	2012 HX_{31}	—	March 24, 2012	Mayhill-ISON	L. Elenin	H	540 m	MPC; JPL
600737	2012 HN_{32}	—	August 22, 2003	Campo Imperatore	CINEOS	·	590 m	MPC; JPL
600738	2012 HV_{33}	—	March 21, 2001	Haleakala	NEAT	·	1.2 km	MPC; JPL
600739	2012 HR_{35}	—	April 27, 2012	Kitt Peak	Spacewatch	·	760 m	MPC; JPL
600740	2012 HQ_{39}	—	December 19, 2007	Mount Lemmon	Mount Lemmon Survey	·	1.1 km	MPC; JPL
600741	2012 HP_{40}	—	April 16, 2012	Kitt Peak	Spacewatch	PHO	660 m	MPC; JPL
600742	2012 HH_{42}	—	March 8, 2005	Mount Lemmon	Mount Lemmon Survey	·	490 m	MPC; JPL
600743	2012 HO_{42}	—	April 18, 2012	Mount Lemmon	Mount Lemmon Survey	·	1.2 km	MPC; JPL
600744	2012 HH_{45}	—	May 11, 2005	Palomar	NEAT	·	840 m	MPC; JPL
600745	2012 HS_{49}	—	March 3, 2005	Catalina	CSS	·	600 m	MPC; JPL
600746	2012 HC_{52}	—	April 27, 2012	Haleakala	Pan-STARRS 1	PHO	720 m	MPC; JPL
600747	2012 HQ_{53}	—	March 16, 2012	Kitt Peak	Spacewatch	V	540 m	MPC; JPL
600748	2012 HH_{56}	—	March 24, 2012	Kitt Peak	Spacewatch	·	2.5 km	MPC; JPL
600749	2012 HN_{57}	—	March 4, 2012	Mount Lemmon	Mount Lemmon Survey	·	580 m	MPC; JPL
600750	2012 HU_{64}	—	March 11, 2005	Kitt Peak	Spacewatch	·	510 m	MPC; JPL
600751	2012 HU_{65}	—	March 27, 2012	Mount Lemmon	Mount Lemmon Survey	·	810 m	MPC; JPL
600752	2012 HT_{69}	—	November 18, 2006	Mount Lemmon	Mount Lemmon Survey	·	1.8 km	MPC; JPL
600753	2012 HR_{71}	—	May 3, 2008	Mount Lemmon	Mount Lemmon Survey	EUN	1.3 km	MPC; JPL
600754	2012 HF_{73}	—	March 9, 2008	Mount Lemmon	Mount Lemmon Survey	·	970 m	MPC; JPL
600755	2012 HQ_{79}	—	April 30, 2012	Mount Lemmon	Mount Lemmon Survey	PHO	990 m	MPC; JPL
600756	2012 HB_{81}	—	April 13, 2012	Kitt Peak	Spacewatch	·	610 m	MPC; JPL
600757	2012 HK_{84}	—	March 22, 2012	Catalina	CSS	H	640 m	MPC; JPL
600758	2012 HR_{85}	—	April 20, 2012	Mount Lemmon	Mount Lemmon Survey	·	700 m	MPC; JPL
600759	2012 HR_{95}	—	July 5, 2014	Haleakala	Pan-STARRS 1	·	3.8 km	MPC; JPL
600760	2012 HR_{97}	—	April 27, 2012	Haleakala	Pan-STARRS 1	·	540 m	MPC; JPL
600761	2012 HF_{103}	—	April 19, 2012	Mount Lemmon	Mount Lemmon Survey	·	670 m	MPC; JPL
600762	2012 HP_{103}	—	April 16, 2012	Haleakala	Pan-STARRS 1	·	2.4 km	MPC; JPL
600763	2012 HK_{104}	—	April 27, 2012	Haleakala	Pan-STARRS 1	·	2.4 km	MPC; JPL
600764	2012 JO_{8}	—	April 20, 2012	Kitt Peak	Spacewatch	·	1.4 km	MPC; JPL
600765	2012 JT_{13}	—	April 24, 2012	Kitt Peak	Spacewatch	·	1.1 km	MPC; JPL
600766	2012 JX_{14}	—	July 5, 2005	Mount Lemmon	Mount Lemmon Survey	·	1.1 km	MPC; JPL
600767	2012 JM_{20}	—	May 1, 2012	Mount Lemmon	Mount Lemmon Survey	·	1.0 km	MPC; JPL
600768	2012 JF_{24}	—	May 12, 2012	Haleakala	Pan-STARRS 1	·	970 m	MPC; JPL
600769	2012 JH_{24}	—	June 11, 2000	Socorro	LINEAR	·	1.5 km	MPC; JPL
600770	2012 JL_{24}	—	August 25, 2005	Palomar	NEAT	·	1.2 km	MPC; JPL
600771	2012 JL_{27}	—	May 15, 2012	Kitt Peak	Spacewatch	H	480 m	MPC; JPL
600772	2012 JB_{39}	—	April 27, 2008	Kitt Peak	Spacewatch	·	800 m	MPC; JPL
600773	2012 JR_{39}	—	April 21, 2012	Mount Lemmon	Mount Lemmon Survey	·	770 m	MPC; JPL
600774	2012 JZ_{43}	—	February 10, 2008	Kitt Peak	Spacewatch	·	1.0 km	MPC; JPL
600775	2012 JQ_{46}	—	November 24, 2008	Mount Lemmon	Mount Lemmon Survey	H	420 m	MPC; JPL
600776	2012 JC_{53}	—	January 30, 2011	Mayhill-ISON	L. Elenin	·	2.8 km	MPC; JPL
600777	2012 JF_{53}	—	April 5, 2008	Mount Lemmon	Mount Lemmon Survey	·	890 m	MPC; JPL
600778	2012 JG_{54}	—	April 16, 2007	Mount Lemmon	Mount Lemmon Survey	·	1.5 km	MPC; JPL
600779	2012 JM_{54}	—	April 27, 2008	Kitt Peak	Spacewatch	·	700 m	MPC; JPL
600780	2012 JS_{57}	—	September 26, 2003	Apache Point	SDSS Collaboration	·	3.4 km	MPC; JPL
600781	2012 JL_{58}	—	August 6, 2005	Palomar	NEAT	·	1.3 km	MPC; JPL
600782	2012 JT_{63}	—	February 18, 2005	La Silla	A. Boattini	·	1.1 km	MPC; JPL
600783	2012 JW_{63}	—	August 27, 2009	Kitt Peak	Spacewatch	·	770 m	MPC; JPL
600784	2012 JB_{70}	—	March 15, 2016	Haleakala	Pan-STARRS 1	·	1.0 km	MPC; JPL
600785	2012 JF_{71}	—	May 1, 2012	Mount Lemmon	Mount Lemmon Survey	·	560 m	MPC; JPL
600786	2012 KZ_{1}	—	March 28, 2012	Mount Lemmon	Mount Lemmon Survey	·	610 m	MPC; JPL
600787	2012 KF_{4}	—	August 20, 2002	Palomar	NEAT	·	630 m	MPC; JPL
600788	2012 KE_{6}	—	May 8, 2008	Mount Lemmon	Mount Lemmon Survey	·	920 m	MPC; JPL
600789	2012 KO_{16}	—	May 20, 2012	Mount Lemmon	Mount Lemmon Survey	·	660 m	MPC; JPL
600790	2012 KG_{18}	—	April 25, 2012	Mount Lemmon	Mount Lemmon Survey	H	560 m	MPC; JPL
600791	2012 KW_{18}	—	January 30, 2011	Mount Lemmon	Mount Lemmon Survey	·	2.5 km	MPC; JPL
600792	2012 KY_{25}	—	March 29, 2012	Kitt Peak	Spacewatch	MAS	610 m	MPC; JPL
600793	2012 KC_{33}	—	November 3, 2010	Mount Lemmon	Mount Lemmon Survey	·	550 m	MPC; JPL
600794	2012 KF_{38}	—	April 27, 2012	Haleakala	Pan-STARRS 1	·	1.5 km	MPC; JPL
600795	2012 KP_{39}	—	January 26, 2007	Kitt Peak	Spacewatch	·	1.6 km	MPC; JPL
600796	2012 KJ_{41}	—	May 20, 2012	Mount Lemmon	Mount Lemmon Survey	·	810 m	MPC; JPL
600797	2012 KZ_{44}	—	August 29, 2005	Palomar	NEAT	·	1.1 km	MPC; JPL
600798	2012 KH_{48}	—	May 27, 2012	Mount Lemmon	Mount Lemmon Survey	·	800 m	MPC; JPL
600799	2012 KO_{53}	—	May 7, 2016	Haleakala	Pan-STARRS 1	·	860 m	MPC; JPL
600800	2012 KY_{55}	—	May 22, 2012	ESA OGS	ESA OGS	·	950 m	MPC; JPL

== 600801–600900 ==
back to top

Designation			Discovery			Properties		Ref
Permanent	Provisional	Named after	Date	Site	Discoverer(s)	Category	Diam.	Ref
600801	2012 KN_{57}	—	February 12, 2015	Haleakala	Pan-STARRS 1	·	870 m	MPC; JPL
600802	2012 LG	—	November 4, 1991	Kitt Peak	Spacewatch	H	610 m	MPC; JPL
600803	2012 LH_{1}	—	June 9, 2012	Nogales	M. Schwartz, P. R. Holvorcem	H	580 m	MPC; JPL
600804	2012 LK_{5}	—	June 11, 2012	Haleakala	Pan-STARRS 1	PHO	1.5 km	MPC; JPL
600805	2012 LP_{5}	—	May 13, 2012	Mount Lemmon	Mount Lemmon Survey	·	700 m	MPC; JPL
600806	2012 LK_{6}	—	August 30, 2000	Kitt Peak	Spacewatch	·	1.1 km	MPC; JPL
600807	2012 LT_{9}	—	January 11, 2011	Kitt Peak	Spacewatch	HNS	1.0 km	MPC; JPL
600808	2012 LU_{13}	—	November 11, 2010	Catalina	CSS	H	650 m	MPC; JPL
600809	2012 LC_{18}	—	May 21, 2012	Haleakala	Pan-STARRS 1	·	940 m	MPC; JPL
600810	2012 LA_{24}	—	February 10, 2011	Mount Lemmon	Mount Lemmon Survey	MAR	680 m	MPC; JPL
600811	2012 LG_{27}	—	October 26, 2013	Mount Lemmon	Mount Lemmon Survey	·	1.7 km	MPC; JPL
600812	2012 LJ_{27}	—	July 30, 2008	Kitt Peak	Spacewatch	·	1.3 km	MPC; JPL
600813	2012 LN_{27}	—	June 15, 2012	Haleakala	Pan-STARRS 1	·	2.0 km	MPC; JPL
600814	2012 MZ_{2}	—	June 15, 2012	Haleakala	Pan-STARRS 1	H	530 m	MPC; JPL
600815	2012 MM_{7}	—	June 9, 2012	Nogales	M. Schwartz, P. R. Holvorcem	·	1.2 km	MPC; JPL
600816	2012 MP_{8}	—	May 25, 2012	ESA OGS	ESA OGS	·	3.4 km	MPC; JPL
600817	2012 MK_{9}	—	June 16, 2012	Mount Lemmon	Mount Lemmon Survey	·	1 km	MPC; JPL
600818	2012 MZ_{9}	—	May 19, 2012	Mount Lemmon	Mount Lemmon Survey	·	1.3 km	MPC; JPL
600819	2012 ML_{11}	—	June 14, 2012	Mount Lemmon	Mount Lemmon Survey	·	1.2 km	MPC; JPL
600820	2012 MA_{15}	—	June 17, 2012	Kitt Peak	Spacewatch	·	900 m	MPC; JPL
600821	2012 MV_{16}	—	November 29, 2013	Haleakala	Pan-STARRS 1	·	900 m	MPC; JPL
600822	2012 MA_{17}	—	September 30, 1997	Kitt Peak	Spacewatch	·	1.0 km	MPC; JPL
600823	2012 OS_{5}	—	September 21, 2004	Kitt Peak	Spacewatch	·	1.2 km	MPC; JPL
600824	2012 PE_{4}	—	August 8, 2012	Haleakala	Pan-STARRS 1	KOR	1.1 km	MPC; JPL
600825	2012 PW_{5}	—	August 25, 2005	Palomar	NEAT	·	840 m	MPC; JPL
600826	2012 PD_{6}	—	August 7, 2012	Marly	P. Kocher	·	2.1 km	MPC; JPL
600827	2012 PT_{6}	—	December 13, 2009	Weihai	University, Shandong	·	1.8 km	MPC; JPL
600828	2012 PS_{10}	—	September 29, 2008	Mount Lemmon	Mount Lemmon Survey	·	1.3 km	MPC; JPL
600829	2012 PQ_{14}	—	May 21, 2012	Mount Lemmon	Mount Lemmon Survey	BRG	1.5 km	MPC; JPL
600830	2012 PX_{17}	—	June 16, 2009	Mount Lemmon	Mount Lemmon Survey	H	550 m	MPC; JPL
600831	2012 PV_{21}	—	October 4, 2004	Kitt Peak	Spacewatch	(5)	1.1 km	MPC; JPL
600832	2012 PC_{24}	—	February 22, 2003	Palomar	NEAT	·	3.9 km	MPC; JPL
600833	2012 PG_{26}	—	August 12, 2012	Siding Spring	SSS	·	1.8 km	MPC; JPL
600834	2012 PJ_{27}	—	August 13, 2012	Haleakala	Pan-STARRS 1	·	1.1 km	MPC; JPL
600835	2012 PZ_{27}	—	May 28, 2012	Mount Lemmon	Mount Lemmon Survey	EUN	1.1 km	MPC; JPL
600836	2012 PB_{28}	—	August 14, 2012	Siding Spring	SSS	·	890 m	MPC; JPL
600837	2012 PO_{29}	—	August 13, 2012	Haleakala	Pan-STARRS 1	·	1.2 km	MPC; JPL
600838	2012 PF_{30}	—	May 28, 2008	Kitt Peak	Spacewatch	·	1.2 km	MPC; JPL
600839	2012 PQ_{30}	—	August 7, 2012	Mayhill-ISON	L. Elenin	·	560 m	MPC; JPL
600840	2012 PO_{31}	—	August 12, 2012	Catalina	CSS	MAS	640 m	MPC; JPL
600841	2012 PU_{39}	—	August 10, 2012	Haleakala	Pan-STARRS 1	·	1.0 km	MPC; JPL
600842	2012 PX_{45}	—	January 28, 2015	Haleakala	Pan-STARRS 1	EUN	1.1 km	MPC; JPL
600843	2012 PZ_{45}	—	November 6, 2013	Haleakala	Pan-STARRS 1	·	950 m	MPC; JPL
600844	2012 PY_{46}	—	November 2, 2007	Socorro	LINEAR	·	2.5 km	MPC; JPL
600845	2012 PK_{54}	—	August 14, 2012	Siding Spring	SSS	·	1.3 km	MPC; JPL
600846	2012 PQ_{55}	—	June 24, 2010	WISE	WISE	3:2 · (6124)	5.2 km	MPC; JPL
600847	2012 PT_{58}	—	August 9, 2012	Haleakala	Pan-STARRS 1	·	990 m	MPC; JPL
600848	2012 QD	—	February 28, 2003	Haleakala	NEAT	H	560 m	MPC; JPL
600849	2012 QY_{2}	—	September 3, 2008	Kitt Peak	Spacewatch	·	1.5 km	MPC; JPL
600850	2012 QQ_{3}	—	September 19, 2009	Mount Lemmon	Mount Lemmon Survey	·	510 m	MPC; JPL
600851	2012 QS_{5}	—	August 17, 2012	Haleakala	Pan-STARRS 1	THM	2.1 km	MPC; JPL
600852	2012 QP_{7}	—	April 12, 2011	Mount Lemmon	Mount Lemmon Survey	·	1.2 km	MPC; JPL
600853	2012 QG_{19}	—	January 31, 2006	Kitt Peak	Spacewatch	H	360 m	MPC; JPL
600854	2012 QQ_{19}	—	May 28, 2012	Mount Lemmon	Mount Lemmon Survey	·	1.1 km	MPC; JPL
600855	2012 QD_{25}	—	August 24, 2012	Kitt Peak	Spacewatch	·	1.6 km	MPC; JPL
600856	2012 QY_{36}	—	August 8, 2012	Haleakala	Pan-STARRS 1	·	1.2 km	MPC; JPL
600857	2012 QC_{45}	—	August 10, 2012	Kitt Peak	Spacewatch	·	2.5 km	MPC; JPL
600858	2012 QR_{48}	—	March 26, 2003	Palomar	NEAT	·	1.4 km	MPC; JPL
600859	2012 QL_{51}	—	August 29, 2012	Alder Springs	Levin, K.	·	850 m	MPC; JPL
600860	2012 QV_{53}	—	August 26, 2012	Haleakala	Pan-STARRS 1	EUN	910 m	MPC; JPL
600861	2012 QS_{54}	—	August 25, 2012	Haleakala	Pan-STARRS 1	NYS	1.0 km	MPC; JPL
600862	2012 QY_{54}	—	August 26, 2012	Catalina	CSS	·	1.2 km	MPC; JPL
600863	2012 QA_{72}	—	August 26, 2012	Kitt Peak	Spacewatch	·	1.4 km	MPC; JPL
600864	2012 RA_{2}	—	October 7, 2004	Goodricke-Pigott	R. A. Tucker	H	640 m	MPC; JPL
600865	2012 RJ_{4}	—	October 6, 2004	Palomar	NEAT	H	480 m	MPC; JPL
600866	2012 RM_{4}	—	September 10, 2012	Charleston	R. Holmes	·	1.1 km	MPC; JPL
600867 Kinghu	2012 RV_{4}	Kinghu	July 21, 2007	Lulin	LUSS	·	2.5 km	MPC; JPL
600868	2012 RY_{10}	—	September 13, 2012	Charleston	R. Holmes	·	1.7 km	MPC; JPL
600869	2012 RL_{25}	—	August 25, 2012	Haleakala	Pan-STARRS 1	·	1.6 km	MPC; JPL
600870	2012 RH_{27}	—	September 22, 2008	Mount Lemmon	Mount Lemmon Survey	·	1.4 km	MPC; JPL
600871	2012 RL_{34}	—	March 4, 2011	Kitt Peak	Spacewatch	·	720 m	MPC; JPL
600872	2012 RS_{36}	—	August 14, 2012	Kitt Peak	Spacewatch	·	930 m	MPC; JPL
600873	2012 RB_{38}	—	September 15, 2012	Catalina	CSS	(5)	1.3 km	MPC; JPL
600874	2012 RC_{40}	—	September 1, 2005	Palomar	NEAT	·	790 m	MPC; JPL
600875	2012 RC_{42}	—	October 22, 2008	Kitt Peak	Spacewatch	·	1.1 km	MPC; JPL
600876	2012 RH_{42}	—	August 16, 2012	Siding Spring	SSS	·	1.4 km	MPC; JPL
600877	2012 RO_{42}	—	September 13, 2012	Siding Spring	SSS	·	1.7 km	MPC; JPL
600878	2012 RQ_{44}	—	August 28, 2003	Palomar	NEAT	·	2.4 km	MPC; JPL
600879	2012 RF_{46}	—	September 15, 2012	Catalina	CSS	·	2.4 km	MPC; JPL
600880	2012 SO	—	September 11, 2007	Mount Lemmon	Mount Lemmon Survey	T_{j} (2.99)	2.6 km	MPC; JPL
600881	2012 SX_{9}	—	December 19, 2004	Mount Lemmon	Mount Lemmon Survey	·	1.6 km	MPC; JPL
600882	2012 ST_{12}	—	September 17, 2012	Kitt Peak	Spacewatch	·	1.2 km	MPC; JPL
600883	2012 SJ_{13}	—	September 13, 2002	Palomar	NEAT	·	2.1 km	MPC; JPL
600884	2012 SB_{15}	—	October 25, 2008	Kitt Peak	Spacewatch	·	1.7 km	MPC; JPL
600885	2012 SK_{30}	—	August 27, 2005	Palomar	NEAT	·	520 m	MPC; JPL
600886	2012 SQ_{30}	—	September 16, 2012	Catalina	CSS	·	2.7 km	MPC; JPL
600887	2012 SZ_{32}	—	October 25, 2003	Kitt Peak	Spacewatch	·	1.6 km	MPC; JPL
600888	2012 SQ_{33}	—	December 3, 2002	Palomar	NEAT	L5	10 km	MPC; JPL
600889	2012 SA_{34}	—	September 18, 2012	Mount Lemmon	Mount Lemmon Survey	HNS	800 m	MPC; JPL
600890	2012 SC_{35}	—	September 7, 2008	Mount Lemmon	Mount Lemmon Survey	·	1.3 km	MPC; JPL
600891	2012 SY_{42}	—	September 18, 2012	Mount Lemmon	Mount Lemmon Survey	·	910 m	MPC; JPL
600892	2012 SP_{46}	—	August 21, 2003	Campo Imperatore	CINEOS	·	1.4 km	MPC; JPL
600893	2012 SM_{47}	—	March 10, 2005	Mount Lemmon	Mount Lemmon Survey	KOR	1.3 km	MPC; JPL
600894	2012 SZ_{47}	—	September 23, 2012	Mount Lemmon	Mount Lemmon Survey	HNS	880 m	MPC; JPL
600895	2012 SW_{48}	—	December 3, 2005	Mauna Kea	A. Boattini	L5	8.4 km	MPC; JPL
600896	2012 SV_{59}	—	September 20, 2006	Catalina	CSS	T_{j} (2.99)	3.8 km	MPC; JPL
600897	2012 SC_{64}	—	January 29, 2003	Palomar	NEAT	·	2.5 km	MPC; JPL
600898	2012 SO_{65}	—	August 26, 2012	Catalina	CSS	NYS	1.0 km	MPC; JPL
600899	2012 SB_{69}	—	September 17, 2012	Mount Lemmon	Mount Lemmon Survey	·	1.3 km	MPC; JPL
600900	2012 SK_{73}	—	May 12, 2015	Mount Lemmon	Mount Lemmon Survey	EUN	820 m	MPC; JPL

== 600901–601000 ==
back to top

Designation			Discovery			Properties		Ref
Permanent	Provisional	Named after	Date	Site	Discoverer(s)	Category	Diam.	Ref
600901	2012 SN_{73}	—	September 21, 2012	Kitt Peak	Spacewatch	·	2.7 km	MPC; JPL
600902	2012 SE_{88}	—	September 18, 2012	Mount Lemmon	Mount Lemmon Survey	·	1.2 km	MPC; JPL
600903	2012 SH_{93}	—	September 22, 2012	Kitt Peak	Spacewatch	BRA	900 m	MPC; JPL
600904	2012 SN_{96}	—	September 19, 2012	Mount Lemmon	Mount Lemmon Survey	GEF	780 m	MPC; JPL
600905	2012 TR	—	December 3, 2005	Mauna Kea	A. Boattini	L5	6.7 km	MPC; JPL
600906	2012 TQ_{9}	—	September 15, 2012	Kitt Peak	Spacewatch	MAR	1.3 km	MPC; JPL
600907	2012 TS_{10}	—	October 6, 2012	Mount Lemmon	Mount Lemmon Survey	·	1.2 km	MPC; JPL
600908	2012 TU_{12}	—	April 17, 2010	Mount Lemmon	Mount Lemmon Survey	EUN	1.0 km	MPC; JPL
600909	2012 TZ_{16}	—	September 15, 2012	ESA OGS	ESA OGS	EUN	1.1 km	MPC; JPL
600910	2012 TD_{24}	—	February 16, 2010	Kitt Peak	Spacewatch	MAR	810 m	MPC; JPL
600911	2012 TH_{24}	—	September 15, 2012	Kitt Peak	Spacewatch	HNS	1.2 km	MPC; JPL
600912	2012 TC_{31}	—	October 6, 1999	Socorro	LINEAR	JUN	1.0 km	MPC; JPL
600913	2012 TD_{33}	—	September 15, 2012	Mount Lemmon	Mount Lemmon Survey	·	1.6 km	MPC; JPL
600914	2012 TF_{35}	—	October 1, 2008	Mount Lemmon	Mount Lemmon Survey	(5)	1.1 km	MPC; JPL
600915	2012 TB_{38}	—	October 8, 2012	Mount Lemmon	Mount Lemmon Survey	·	1.4 km	MPC; JPL
600916	2012 TZ_{38}	—	October 8, 2012	Mount Lemmon	Mount Lemmon Survey	·	1.8 km	MPC; JPL
600917	2012 TZ_{49}	—	September 9, 2008	Mount Lemmon	Mount Lemmon Survey	MAR	840 m	MPC; JPL
600918	2012 TL_{51}	—	October 8, 2012	Haleakala	Pan-STARRS 1	·	1.1 km	MPC; JPL
600919	2012 TD_{52}	—	November 3, 2003	Apache Point	SDSS Collaboration	L5	10 km	MPC; JPL
600920	2012 TE_{57}	—	October 6, 2012	Kitt Peak	Spacewatch	·	1.6 km	MPC; JPL
600921	2012 TN_{57}	—	October 6, 2012	Mount Lemmon	Mount Lemmon Survey	·	1.0 km	MPC; JPL
600922	2012 TA_{62}	—	October 27, 2008	Kitt Peak	Spacewatch	EUN	1.1 km	MPC; JPL
600923	2012 TX_{62}	—	October 21, 2008	Kitt Peak	Spacewatch	·	1.5 km	MPC; JPL
600924	2012 TE_{69}	—	March 16, 2002	Haleakala	NEAT	·	2.0 km	MPC; JPL
600925	2012 TX_{80}	—	October 9, 2007	Kitt Peak	Spacewatch	·	2.1 km	MPC; JPL
600926	2012 TQ_{89}	—	September 21, 2012	Kitt Peak	Spacewatch	·	1.4 km	MPC; JPL
600927	2012 TJ_{92}	—	October 9, 2007	Kitt Peak	Spacewatch	·	1.3 km	MPC; JPL
600928	2012 TC_{96}	—	August 24, 2008	Kitt Peak	Spacewatch	·	820 m	MPC; JPL
600929	2012 TQ_{97}	—	October 27, 2005	Mount Lemmon	Mount Lemmon Survey	·	490 m	MPC; JPL
600930	2012 TK_{101}	—	September 18, 2003	Palomar	NEAT	·	1.5 km	MPC; JPL
600931	2012 TB_{116}	—	October 10, 2012	Mount Lemmon	Mount Lemmon Survey	·	1.1 km	MPC; JPL
600932	2012 TW_{119}	—	September 25, 2012	Kitt Peak	Spacewatch	·	600 m	MPC; JPL
600933	2012 TN_{120}	—	October 10, 2012	Mount Lemmon	Mount Lemmon Survey	NEM	1.8 km	MPC; JPL
600934	2012 TS_{122}	—	October 8, 2008	Kitt Peak	Spacewatch	·	1.0 km	MPC; JPL
600935	2012 TD_{123}	—	July 2, 2011	Kitt Peak	Spacewatch	L5	9.4 km	MPC; JPL
600936	2012 TF_{123}	—	September 26, 2012	Haleakala	Pan-STARRS 1	H	490 m	MPC; JPL
600937	2012 TA_{126}	—	September 17, 2003	Kitt Peak	Spacewatch	·	2.5 km	MPC; JPL
600938	2012 TM_{135}	—	October 6, 2012	Haleakala	Pan-STARRS 1	·	1.3 km	MPC; JPL
600939	2012 TC_{136}	—	October 7, 2012	Haleakala	Pan-STARRS 1	·	1.8 km	MPC; JPL
600940	2012 TK_{138}	—	October 8, 2012	Nogales	M. Schwartz, P. R. Holvorcem	·	1.4 km	MPC; JPL
600941	2012 TP_{144}	—	September 20, 2003	Palomar	NEAT	·	1.7 km	MPC; JPL
600942	2012 TT_{144}	—	April 13, 2011	Kitt Peak	Spacewatch	·	1.1 km	MPC; JPL
600943	2012 TD_{148}	—	December 31, 2008	Kitt Peak	Spacewatch	EOS	1.5 km	MPC; JPL
600944	2012 TD_{150}	—	September 28, 2003	Kitt Peak	Spacewatch	·	1.6 km	MPC; JPL
600945	2012 TF_{159}	—	October 8, 2012	Mount Lemmon	Mount Lemmon Survey	·	1.4 km	MPC; JPL
600946	2012 TL_{159}	—	October 8, 2012	Haleakala	Pan-STARRS 1	·	1.2 km	MPC; JPL
600947	2012 TA_{161}	—	March 28, 2009	Kitt Peak	Spacewatch	·	2.0 km	MPC; JPL
600948	2012 TD_{162}	—	August 6, 2008	Eygalayes	Sogorb, P.	NYS	1.1 km	MPC; JPL
600949	2012 TQ_{168}	—	October 8, 2012	Haleakala	Pan-STARRS 1	·	1.8 km	MPC; JPL
600950	2012 TG_{182}	—	September 20, 2003	Kitt Peak	Spacewatch	·	1.4 km	MPC; JPL
600951	2012 TL_{183}	—	September 14, 2007	Mount Lemmon	Mount Lemmon Survey	KOR	1.0 km	MPC; JPL
600952	2012 TH_{184}	—	January 25, 2009	Kitt Peak	Spacewatch	·	2.0 km	MPC; JPL
600953	2012 TR_{188}	—	September 17, 2012	Mount Lemmon	Mount Lemmon Survey	·	1.2 km	MPC; JPL
600954	2012 TA_{189}	—	September 29, 2003	Kitt Peak	Spacewatch	·	1.5 km	MPC; JPL
600955	2012 TN_{192}	—	October 25, 2008	Kitt Peak	Spacewatch	HNS	990 m	MPC; JPL
600956	2012 TT_{196}	—	September 19, 2003	Anderson Mesa	LONEOS	·	1.9 km	MPC; JPL
600957	2012 TB_{212}	—	October 9, 2008	Mount Lemmon	Mount Lemmon Survey	·	830 m	MPC; JPL
600958	2012 TO_{214}	—	March 13, 2005	Kitt Peak	Spacewatch	·	1.4 km	MPC; JPL
600959	2012 TD_{218}	—	December 15, 2006	Kitt Peak	Spacewatch	(2076)	1.0 km	MPC; JPL
600960	2012 TV_{223}	—	October 6, 2012	Mount Lemmon	Mount Lemmon Survey	·	1.7 km	MPC; JPL
600961	2012 TR_{226}	—	October 15, 2012	Haleakala	Pan-STARRS 1	·	1.4 km	MPC; JPL
600962	2012 TV_{242}	—	October 8, 2012	Haleakala	Pan-STARRS 1	·	1.7 km	MPC; JPL
600963	2012 TM_{246}	—	October 10, 2012	Mount Lemmon	Mount Lemmon Survey	·	1.5 km	MPC; JPL
600964	2012 TX_{247}	—	March 14, 2005	Mount Lemmon	Mount Lemmon Survey	·	1.3 km	MPC; JPL
600965	2012 TC_{266}	—	October 6, 2007	Kitt Peak	Spacewatch	·	1.6 km	MPC; JPL
600966	2012 TL_{270}	—	October 11, 2012	Haleakala	Pan-STARRS 1	·	1.2 km	MPC; JPL
600967	2012 TH_{272}	—	October 6, 2012	Mount Lemmon	Mount Lemmon Survey	·	1.4 km	MPC; JPL
600968	2012 TM_{272}	—	November 3, 2008	Mount Lemmon	Mount Lemmon Survey	·	1.6 km	MPC; JPL
600969	2012 TX_{275}	—	September 21, 2012	Kitt Peak	Spacewatch	·	1.7 km	MPC; JPL
600970	2012 TX_{281}	—	October 11, 2012	Mount Lemmon	Mount Lemmon Survey	·	1.6 km	MPC; JPL
600971	2012 TP_{283}	—	October 7, 2012	Kitt Peak	Spacewatch	·	2.9 km	MPC; JPL
600972	2012 TU_{292}	—	October 6, 2012	Kitt Peak	Spacewatch	·	1.7 km	MPC; JPL
600973	2012 TG_{293}	—	October 14, 2012	Kitt Peak	Spacewatch	PAD	1.4 km	MPC; JPL
600974	2012 TS_{293}	—	October 6, 2012	Kitt Peak	Spacewatch	·	3.1 km	MPC; JPL
600975	2012 TZ_{294}	—	September 26, 2003	Apache Point	SDSS Collaboration	EUN	1.1 km	MPC; JPL
600976	2012 TJ_{303}	—	September 25, 2003	Palomar	NEAT	·	2.0 km	MPC; JPL
600977	2012 TL_{309}	—	October 21, 2008	Kitt Peak	Spacewatch	·	1.4 km	MPC; JPL
600978	2012 TV_{316}	—	October 14, 2012	Catalina	CSS	·	3.1 km	MPC; JPL
600979	2012 TG_{319}	—	May 16, 2007	Kitt Peak	Spacewatch	MAR	1.1 km	MPC; JPL
600980	2012 TC_{322}	—	December 8, 2005	Kitt Peak	Spacewatch	·	1.5 km	MPC; JPL
600981	2012 TE_{326}	—	November 4, 2007	Kitt Peak	Spacewatch	·	1.5 km	MPC; JPL
600982	2012 TG_{327}	—	September 19, 2012	Mount Lemmon	Mount Lemmon Survey	·	1.4 km	MPC; JPL
600983	2012 TN_{327}	—	October 8, 2012	Kitt Peak	Spacewatch	·	2.2 km	MPC; JPL
600984	2012 TT_{327}	—	October 8, 2012	Mount Lemmon	Mount Lemmon Survey	·	1.2 km	MPC; JPL
600985	2012 TJ_{329}	—	September 22, 2003	Kitt Peak	Spacewatch	·	1.4 km	MPC; JPL
600986	2012 TU_{330}	—	October 10, 2012	Haleakala	Pan-STARRS 1	·	1.4 km	MPC; JPL
600987	2012 TN_{332}	—	November 5, 2013	Haleakala	Pan-STARRS 1	·	2.1 km	MPC; JPL
600988	2012 TD_{335}	—	September 25, 2016	Haleakala	Pan-STARRS 1	EUN	1.1 km	MPC; JPL
600989	2012 TQ_{335}	—	October 15, 2012	Haleakala	Pan-STARRS 1	·	1.3 km	MPC; JPL
600990	2012 TL_{336}	—	October 8, 2012	Mount Lemmon	Mount Lemmon Survey	·	1.4 km	MPC; JPL
600991	2012 TC_{338}	—	October 14, 2012	Mount Lemmon	Mount Lemmon Survey	·	970 m	MPC; JPL
600992	2012 TH_{342}	—	October 9, 2012	Mount Lemmon	Mount Lemmon Survey	·	1.4 km	MPC; JPL
600993	2012 TP_{343}	—	September 25, 2005	Kitt Peak	Spacewatch	·	500 m	MPC; JPL
600994	2012 TF_{348}	—	October 7, 2012	Haleakala	Pan-STARRS 1	·	2.3 km	MPC; JPL
600995	2012 TN_{350}	—	March 20, 1999	Apache Point	SDSS Collaboration	·	820 m	MPC; JPL
600996	2012 TU_{350}	—	October 9, 2012	Mount Lemmon	Mount Lemmon Survey	·	1.2 km	MPC; JPL
600997	2012 TN_{353}	—	October 24, 2013	Mount Lemmon	Mount Lemmon Survey	L5	6.9 km	MPC; JPL
600998	2012 TA_{357}	—	October 11, 2012	Haleakala	Pan-STARRS 1	AGN	970 m	MPC; JPL
600999	2012 TM_{357}	—	October 14, 2012	Kitt Peak	Spacewatch	·	770 m	MPC; JPL
601000	2012 TT_{357}	—	October 6, 2012	Kitt Peak	Spacewatch	·	1.7 km	MPC; JPL

back to top

== Meaning of names ==
As minor planet discoveries are confirmed, they are given a permanent number by the IAU's Minor Planet Center (MPC), and the discoverers can then submit names for them, following the IAU's naming conventions. The list below concerns those minor planets in the specified number-range that have received names, and explains the meanings of those names.

Official naming citations of newly named small Solar System bodies are approved and published in a bulletin by IAU's Working Group for Small Bodies Nomenclature (WGSBN). Before May 2021, citations were published in MPC's Minor Planet Circulars for many decades. Recent citations can also be found on the JPL Small-Body Database (SBDB). Until his death in 2016, German astronomer Lutz D. Schmadel compiled these citations into the Dictionary of Minor Planet Names (DMP) and regularly updated the collection.

Based on Paul Herget's The Names of the Minor Planets, Schmadel also researched the unclear origin of numerous asteroids, most of which had been named prior to World War II. This article incorporates text from this source, which is in the public domain: SBDB New namings may only be added to this list below after official publication as the preannouncement of names is condemned. The WGSBN publishes a comprehensive guideline for the naming rules of non-cometary small Solar System bodies.

Named minor planet	Provisional	This minor planet was named for...	Ref; Catalog
600379 Csortosgyula	2011 UY_{400}	Gyula Csortos (1883–1945), Hungarian actor who appeared in 80 films throughout his career	IAU · 600379
600539 Aldoatiglio	2012 BZ_{24}	Aldo Atiglio Falla (1909–1995), the father of the discoverer.	IAU · 600539
600639 Gevreychambertin	2012 DQ_{15}	Gevrey-Chambertin is a village in France located between Beaune and Dijon.	IAU · 600639
600665 Nuitsaintgeorges	2012 DD_{115}	Nuits-Saint-Georges is a town in France located between Beaune and Dijon.	IAU · 600665
600867 Kinghu	2012 RV_{4}	King Hu (1932-1997), Taiwanese wuxia film director	IAU · 600867
