= Meanings of minor-planet names: 90001–91000 =

As minor planet discoveries are confirmed, they are given a permanent number by the IAU's Minor Planet Center (MPC), and the discoverers can then submit names for them, following the IAU's naming conventions. The list below concerns those minor planets in the specified number-range that have received names, and explains the meanings of those names.

Official naming citations of newly named small Solar System bodies are approved and published in a bulletin by IAU's Working Group for Small Bodies Nomenclature (WGSBN). Before May 2021, citations were published in MPC's Minor Planet Circulars for many decades. Recent citations can also be found on the JPL Small-Body Database (SBDB). Until his death in 2016, German astronomer Lutz D. Schmadel compiled these citations into the Dictionary of Minor Planet Names (DMP) and regularly updated the collection.

Based on Paul Herget's The Names of the Minor Planets, Schmadel also researched the unclear origin of numerous asteroids, most of which had been named prior to World War II. This article incorporates text from this source, which is in the public domain: SBDB New namings may only be added to this list below after official publication as the preannouncement of names is condemned. The WGSBN publishes a comprehensive guideline for the naming rules of non-cometary small Solar System bodies.

== 90001–90100 ==
Named minor planet	Provisional	This minor planet was named for...	Ref · Catalog
90022 Apache Point	2002 TL_{371}	The Apache Point Observatory, owned and operated by the Astrophysical Research Consortium, is the site of the 2.5-meter Sloan Digital Sky Survey telescope and the 3.5-meter ARC telescope.	JPL · 90022

== 90101–90200 ==
back to top

Named minor planet	Provisional	This minor planet was named for...	Ref · Catalog
90125 Chrissquire	2002 XR_{80}	Chris Squire (1948–2015), an English musician and co-founder of the rock music group Yes; 90125, the 1983 studio album by Yes.	JPL · 90125
90138 Diehl	2002 YD	Jacqueline Diehl (born 1963), American first chair of the White Sands Star Party, member of the Alamogordo Astronomy Club, manager of Space Camp at the New Mexico Museum of Space History, and education and public outreach coordinator at the National Solar Observatory	JPL · 90138
90140 Gómezdonet	2002 YK_{2}	Josep Juliá Gómez Donet, a Spanish astronomer and a discoverer of minor planets. He is one of the pioneers in CCD astrometric observation of minor planets and comets in the Valencia region, known for his work at the Marxuquera Observatory. He is a friend of the discoverer, Rafael Ferrando (Src).	JPL · 90140

== 90201–90300 ==
back to top

Named minor planet	Provisional	This minor planet was named for...	Ref · Catalog
90226 Byronsmith	2003 BS_{15}	Byron Smith (born 1973), a mechanical engineer by training, is project manager for Lowell Observatory's Discovery Channel Telescope.	JPL · 90226
90278 Caprese	2003 DH_{9}	Caprese Michelangelo is a village in the province of Arezzo, Tuscany, Italy. It is the birthplace of the Renaissance artist Michelangelo Buonarroti (1475–1564) and of the astronomer Giovanni Santini (1787–1877), who was director the Astronomical Observatory of Padua from 1817 to 1877.	IAU · 90278
90279 Devětsil	2003 DL_{10}	Devětsil, Czech avant-garde group of artists active from 1920 to 1930	JPL · 90279
90288 Dalleave	2003 ET_{17}	Sergio Dalle Ave (born 1955), an Italian technician and night assistant at the Asiago Astrophysical Observatory since 1982, is an expert in graphics and in the enhancement of photographic plates. He contributed to the Asiago-DLR Asteroid Survey (ADAS) project by acquiring and storing data with the Schmidt telescope in Asiago.	JPL · 90288

== 90301–90400 ==
back to top

Named minor planet	Provisional	This minor planet was named for...	Ref · Catalog
90308 Johney	2003 FV_{14}	John Ey (born 1952) is a photographer in Tucson who specializes in natural scenic images of the American west. He is also an amateur paleontologist primarily interested in carnivore dentition	JPL · 90308
90317 Williamcutlip	2003 FZ_{42}	William Cutlip (born 1960), the Launch Segment Manager for the OSIRIS-REx Asteroid Sample Return Mission.	JPL · 90317
90328 Haryou	2003 FQ_{85}	HARYOU (Harlem Youth Opportunities Unlimited)	JPL · 90328
90368 Hristopavlov	2003 MG	Hristo Pavlov, Bulgarian-Australian software engineer.	IAU · 90368
90370 Jókaimór	2003 NY_{5}	Mór Jókai (1825–1904), a Hungarian dramatist and novelist, was an imaginative, humorous and romantic writer. His work allows one to form a good idea of the character of this great Hungarian romancer and patriot. He was also a stargazer and owned an 8-cm refractor.	JPL · 90370
90376 Kossuth	2003 VL	Lajos Kossuth (1802–1894) was a Hungarian lawyer, journalist, politician and governor-president of Hungary during the Hungarian Revolution of 1848-–1849. He was widely honored during his lifetime, including in the U.K. and U.S., as a freedom fighter and advocate for democracy in Europe	JPL · 90376
90377 Sedna	2003 VB_{12}	Sedna, Inuit goddess of the sea	JPL · 90377
90383 Johnloiacono	2003 WN_{89}	John Loiacono (born 1962), the Deputy Project Manager for the OSIRIS-REx Asteroid Sample Return Mission.	JPL · 90383
90388 Philchristensen	2003 WY_{152}	Phil Christensen (born 1953), the Instrument Scientist for the OSIRIS-REx Thermal Emission Spectrometer. He is an expert on the geology of planetary surfaces. He was also the Principal Investigator for the infrared spectrometers and imagers on the Mars Global Surveyor, Mars Odyssey and Mars Exploration Rovers.	JPL · 90388
90396 Franklopez	2003 YA_{4}	Frank Lopez (born 1955) is the owner of StellarVision Astronomy Shop in Tucson, Arizona. As such he has built many of the local amateur observatories, spoken to thousands of children at local schools and helped many budding astronomers	JPL · 90396
90397 Rasch	2003 YW_{4}	Charlie Rasch (1937–2011), a well-known Jazz/Ragtime pianist in the Detroit area of Michigan. He was featured in about a dozen albums in the last 50 years.	JPL · 90397

== 90401–90500 ==
back to top

Named minor planet	Provisional	This minor planet was named for...	Ref · Catalog
90414 Karpov	2003 YP_{110}	Anatoly Karpov (born 1951), Russian chess grandmaster and World Champion for 16 years	JPL · 90414
90429 Wetmore	2004 BW_{37}	Shirley R. Wetmore (born 1947) was the senior curator at the University of Arizona Mineral Museum. In 2001 she received the university's Staff Excellence award. She has been a dedicated member and officer of the Tucson Gem and Mineral Society, which hosts the annual international Tucson Gem and Mineral Show	JPL · 90429
90446 Truesdell	2004 BL_{107}	Robert Truesdell (born 1967) is a Tucson businessman and gifted amateur paleontologist specializing in the fossils of the American southwest	JPL · 90446
90447 Emans	2004 BB_{109}	Mike Emans (born 1944) is a Seattle-area retired computer operations manager formerly with the Department of Information Services for the state of Washington. He is also a semi-professional guitarist with a group called "Common Threads" that played in the Washington area	JPL · 90447
90449 Brucestephenson	2004 BR_{116}	C. Bruce Stephenson (born 1929) was appointed the Warner professor of astronomy at Case Western Reserve University and the Warner and Swasey Observatory in 1988. In 1977 he was co-discoverer of the unusual star SS 433	JPL · 90449
90450 Cyriltyson	2004 BR_{117}	Cyril deGrasse Tyson (1927–2016), American director of HARYOU (see 90328 Haryou)	JPL · 90450
90453 Shawnphillips	2004 CM	Shawn Phillips (born 1943) is a singer/songwriter. Rooted in folk music, he also performs jazz fusion and funk. Phillips has released 26 albums and worked with many other artists, including Donovan, Steve Winwood and Eric Clapton.	IAU · 90453
90455 Irenehernandez	2004 CU_{2}	Irene González Hernández (1969–2014) was a Spanish-American astronomer who worked as part of the GONG program to make major contributions to our understanding of the inhomogeneous internal structure of the Sun, as well as that of the otherwise invisible far-side of the Sun.	JPL · 90455
90461 Matthewgraham	2004 CS_{35}	Matthew Graham (born 1971), a computational scientist working on analysis of massive data sets and sky surveys, including the Palomar-Quest and Catalina Real- Time Transient survey.	JPL · 90461
90463 Johnrichard	2004 CS_{39}	John B. Dixon (born 1923) and Richard R. Dixon (born 1927), American amateur astronomers, in recognition of their help in transporting observatory domes from Michigan to New Mexico and then in the construction of the Jornada Observatory	JPL · 90463
90471 Andrewdrake	2004 CF_{98}	Andrew Drake (born 1969), a scientist at the Center for Advanced Computing Research.	JPL · 90471
90472 Mahabal	2004 CT_{99}	Ashish Mahabal (born 1970), a scientist at the California Institute of Technology.	JPL · 90472
90479 Donalek	2004 CC_{109}	Ciro Donalek (born 1973) is a computational scientist who has applied machine learning to the analysis of massive data sets and sky surveys, including the Palomar- Quest and Catalina Real-Time Transient surveys.	JPL · 90479
90480 Ulrich	2004 CG_{109}	Carl Ulrich (born 1925) is an American fossil preparator, known for his work on the fossils of the Green River Formation of Wyoming. He has instructed hundreds of people in his preparation techniques. His fossils can be seen in museums worldwide and at his gallery just outside the southern boundary of Fossil Butte National Monument.	JPL · 90480
90481 Wollstonecraft	2004 DA	Mary Wollstonecraft (1759–1797), a British writer, philosopher, and early feminist	JPL · 90481
90482 Orcus	2004 DW	Orcus, Roman god of the underworld, punisher of broken oaths	JPL · 90482
90487 Witherspoon	2004 DW_{12}	Tom Witherspoon Sr. (1921–2014) was a well known fossil educator in the Midwest U.S. Thousands of people, not just children, were introduced to the world of paleontology through his efforts and generosity. In 2007 he received the Charles H. Sternberg award for outstanding lifetime achievement in the field of paleontology	JPL · 90487

== 90501–90600 ==
back to top

Named minor planet	Provisional	This minor planet was named for...	Ref · Catalog
90502 Buratti	2004 EM_{7}	Bonnie J. Buratti (born 1952), American senior research scientist at the Jet Propulsion Laboratory, studies photometric properties of the surfaces of outer planet natural satellites and the small bodies of the Solar System. She is a member of the science teams for the Clementine, Deep Space 1, Cassini–Huygens and New Horizons missions.	JPL · 90502
90503 Japhethboyce	2004 EP_{10}	Japheth Boyce (born 1956), an American paleontologist in South Dakota, is best known for his exquisite fossil preparation seen in museums around the world.	JPL · 90503
90525 Karijanberg	2004 FB_{2}	Karen (born 1953), wife of the discoverer James Whitney Young, and her parents, Richard (1928–1978) and Janet Halberg (1932–1997).	JPL · 90525
90526 Paullorenz	2004 FQ_{11}	Paul Gregory Lorenz (born 1952), a professional pianist and has been an avid amateur astronomer, deep sky observer and astrophotographer since the 1960s.	JPL · 90526
90528 Raywhite	2004 FE_{19}	Raymond E. White Jr. (1933–2004), an American astronomer, archaeoastronomer who worked on globular clusters, best known and admired for his commitment to teaching and for his work as an advisor to undergraduates. Between 1964 and 1999 he was progressively an instructor, lecturer and professor at the University of Arizona.	JPL · 90528
90533 Laurentblind	2004 FB_{29}	Laurent Blind (born 1965) a French computer programmer and boyfriend for 18 years of the discoverer Claudine Rinner. His knowledge of programming was a great help in building and automatizing the observatory. He is also a paraglider and equestrian.	JPL · 90533
90564 Markjarnyk	2004 GJ_{2}	Mark Andrew Jarnyk (1963–2006) was an Australian software engineer at the Australian National University's Research School of Astronomy and Astrophysics. He made significant contributions to instrumentation for the Gemini Observatory and the JACARA project. This asteroid is the first numbered discovery from the Siding Spring Survey.	JPL · 90564
90568 Goibniu	2004 GV_{9}	Goibniu, god of metallurgy and hospitality in Irish mythology.	IAU · 90568
90579 Gordonnelson	2004 GF_{39}	Gordon Nelson (born 1956), an American amateur paleontologist in southern Arizona. He is a co-discoverer of the Sonorasaurus in the desert east of Tucson, Arizona.	JPL · 90579

== 90601–90700 ==
back to top

Named minor planet	Provisional	This minor planet was named for...	Ref · Catalog
90672 Metrorheinneckar	1977 RH	The Rhine-Neckar Metropolitan Region with 2.4 million people along the Rhine and Neckar rivers in south western Germany includes the cities of Heidelberg, Mannheim and Ludwigshafen, and 21 universities and research institutions.	JPL · 90672
90698 Kościuszko	1984 EA	Tadeusz Kościuszko (1746–1817), a Polish military engineer who assisted in the American revolution with the design and building of military fortifications, including at West Point, New York.	JPL · 90698

== 90701–90800 ==
back to top

Named minor planet	Provisional	This minor planet was named for...	Ref · Catalog
90703 Indulgentia	1988 RO_{3}	Indulgentia, Latin for "indulgence, goodness, kindness, love, tenderness, fondness", and also "the gratification of another's desires, inclinations or humors"	JPL · 90703
90709 Wettin	1990 TX_{3}	Wettin Castle, a castle near Halle, Saxony-Anhalt, Germany, ancestral seat of the Wettiner dynasty	JPL · 90709
90711 Stotternheim	1990 TB_{10}	The German village of Stotternheim near Erfurt, where the young Martin Luther began his study.	JPL · 90711
90712 Wittelsbach	1990 TE_{13}	Burg Wittelsbach, a castle ruin near Aichach in Bavaria, Germany, ancestral seat of the Wittelsbacher dynasty	JPL · 90712
90713 Chajnantor	1990 VE_{3}	Chajnantor (5000 m), a plateau in the Atacama Desert of northern Chile, where the Atacama Large Millimeter Array will be constructed	JPL · 90713
90717 Flanders	1991 PF_{3}	Flanders is the Dutch-speaking northern part of Belgium. In the late Middle Ages it was one of the richest and most urbanized parts of Europe, and a very sophisticated culture developed, with impressive achievements in the arts and architecture.	IAU · 90717
90718 Castel Gandolfo	1991 RW_{3}	Castel Gandolfo is a small Italian town and the summer residence of the popes. The headquarters of the Vatican Observatory are located in the town.	IAU · 90718
90732 Opdebeeck	1992 PO	Pierre Opdebeeck (born 1928), a philanthropist, was a financial adviser to Belgian industry for many years. After his retirement he started his study of 18th century French Enlightenment.	JPL · 90732

== 90801–90900 ==
back to top

Named minor planet	Provisional	This minor planet was named for...	Ref · Catalog
90806 Rudaki	1995 AE	Rudaki (858–941) was a Persian poet, considered the founder of classical Persian literature.	JPL · 90806
90817 Doylehall	1995 RO	Doyle Hall is an American astronomer and a key member of the Air Force Maui Optical and Supercomputing (AMOS) team, which supports a number of minor planet programs, including JPL's Near-Earth Asteroid Tracking program.	JPL · 90817
90818 Daverichards	1995 RR	Dave Richards (born 1957) was the AMOS Commander during the last years of the twentieth century, ardently supporting the search for near-earth objects in collaboration with the Jet Propulsion Laboratory.	JPL · 90818
90820 McCann	1995 SS_{1}	Jeff McCann (born 1962) was the AMOS Commander during the early years of the twenty-first century. He ensured that funding and support was always available for the NEAT program, and he was an inspiration to all who worked with him.	JPL · 90820
90821 Augustsedláček	1995 SA_{2}	August Sedláček (1843–1926), a Czech historian, archivist and genealogist.	IAU · 90821
90825 Lizhensheng	1995 SU_{53}	Li Zhensheng (born 1931) initiated wide-hybridization between common wheat and Thinopyrum ponticum and was also the originator of wheat-chromosome engineering in China. Several cultivars bred from the offspring of his distant hybridization have significantly improved wheat productivity in China	JPL · 90825
90826 Xuzhihong	1995 TL_{1}	Xu Zhihong (born 1942), a Chinese botanist who steadfastly and effectively supported the development of Chinese astronomy during the periods when he was president of Beijing University and vice president of the Chinese Academy of Sciences	JPL · 90826
90830 Beihang	1995 UX_{7}	Beihang University, founded in 1952, is one of the key institutes in the national agendas "211 Project" and "985 Scheme". It has made great contributions to China's aeronautic and astronautic industry, as well as social and economic development.	JPL · 90830
90837 Raoulvalentini	1995 WT_{4}	Raoul Valentini (1908–1999), an Italian bookbinder, sundial maker and observer of variable stars. He was a member and secretary of the Italian Astronomical Society, and a co-founder of the Astronomical amateur society in Milan (Circolo Astrofili Milano).	IAU · 90837
90844 Todai	1996 AF_{3}	Named after the University of Tokyo (Tokyo Daigaku) founded in 1877. The Kiso Schmidt Observatory, affiliated with the university, was opened in 1974.	IAU · 90844
90875 Hoshitori	1996 VE_{1}	"Hoshitori" ("catching a starry sky") is a nickname for Tottori prefecture where Saji Observatory is located. Tottori has undertaken a dark skies campaign to preserve the night sky and it is one of the best dark sky locations in Japan.	IAU · 90875
90892 Betlémská kaple	1997 BC	Bethlehem Chapel (Betlémská kaple), a medieval religious building in Prague, Czech Republic, notable for its connection with the religious reformer Jan Hus. He served there as an influential preacher from 1402 to 1412. The Chapel bearing the name of Bethlehem could contain almost 3000 people. It was restored in the 1950s.	JPL · 90892

== 90901–91000 ==
back to top

Named minor planet	Provisional	This minor planet was named for...	Ref · Catalog
90918 Jasinski	1997 PF_{1}	Christian Jasinski (born 1963) was the first webmaster of the Association des Utilisateurs de Détecteurs Electroniques. He helped in both English translation and computer science, specifically for the AudeLA software	JPL · 90918
90919 Luoliaofu	1997 PA_{5}	Luo Liaofu (b. 1935), an emeritus professor of physics at Inner Mongolia University.	IAU · 90919
90926 Stáhalík	1997 SH_{1}	Martin Stáhalík (1962–2001), Czech aerobatic pilot.	JPL · 90926
90936 Neronet	1997 TN_{19}	Neronet is a new red grape variety developed by Vilém Kraus (b.~1924) in Lednice in southern Moravia, Czech Republic	JPL · 90936
90937 Josefdufek	1997 TP_{19}	Josef Dufek (born 1950) is a Moravian winemaker	JPL · 90937
90944 Pujol	1997 UG_{3}	Michel Pujol (born 1957) created an Ethernet microcontroller designed for CCD cameras used by members of the Association des Utilisateurs de Détecteurs Electroniques. He is also a computer scientist who contributes to the AudeLA software	JPL · 90944
90953 Hideosaitou	1997 VA_{9}	Hideo Saitou (born 1946) is the leader of activities of the Fukushima branch of the Japanese Young Astronauts Club, formed by the Japan Aerospace Exploration Agency.	JPL · 90953

back to top

Preceded by 89,001–90,000	Meanings of minor-planet names List of minor planets: 90,001–91,000	Succeeded by 91,001–92,000
