= List of minor planets: 90001–91000 =

The following is a partial list of minor planets, running from minor-planet number 90001 through 91000, inclusive. The primary data for this and other partial lists is based on JPL's "Small-Body Orbital Elements" and data available from the Minor Planet Center. Critical list information is also provided by the MPC, unless otherwise specified from Lowell Observatory. A detailed description of the table's columns and additional sources are given on the main page including a complete list of every page in this series, and a statistical break-up on the dynamical classification of minor planets.

Also see the summary list of all named bodies in numerical and alphabetical order, and the corresponding naming citations for the number range of this particular list. New namings may only be added to this list after official publication, as the preannouncement of names is condemned by the Working Group for Small Bodies Nomenclature of the International Astronomical Union.

Near-Earth obj.	MBA (inner)	MBA (outer)	Centaur
Mars-crosser	MBA (middle)	Jupiter trojan	Trans-Neptunian obj.
Unclassified

== 90001–90100 ==
Designation			Discovery			Properties		Ref
Permanent	Provisional	Named after	Date	Site	Discoverer(s)	Category	Diam.	Ref
90001	2002 TV_{111}	—	October 3, 2002	Socorro	LINEAR	·	1.4 km	MPC; JPL
90002	2002 TL_{142}	—	October 3, 2002	Socorro	LINEAR	NYS	2.0 km	MPC; JPL
90003	2002 TP_{143}	—	October 4, 2002	Socorro	LINEAR	·	2.9 km	MPC; JPL
90004	2002 TT_{144}	—	October 5, 2002	Palomar	NEAT	·	3.6 km	MPC; JPL
90005	2002 TM_{156}	—	October 5, 2002	Palomar	NEAT	H	780 m	MPC; JPL
90006	2002 TU_{176}	—	October 5, 2002	Socorro	LINEAR	·	3.4 km	MPC; JPL
90007	2002 TE_{179}	—	October 13, 2002	Palomar	NEAT	·	5.6 km	MPC; JPL
90008	2002 TV_{185}	—	October 4, 2002	Socorro	LINEAR	·	7.8 km	MPC; JPL
90009	2002 TQ_{200}	—	October 4, 2002	Socorro	LINEAR	·	2.7 km	MPC; JPL
90010	2002 TS_{202}	—	October 4, 2002	Socorro	LINEAR	·	4.2 km	MPC; JPL
90011	2002 TU_{206}	—	October 4, 2002	Socorro	LINEAR	PAD	6.0 km	MPC; JPL
90012	2002 TA_{211}	—	October 7, 2002	Socorro	LINEAR	·	2.1 km	MPC; JPL
90013	2002 TM_{240}	—	October 9, 2002	Socorro	LINEAR	·	3.3 km	MPC; JPL
90014	2002 TO_{260}	—	October 9, 2002	Socorro	LINEAR	·	1.5 km	MPC; JPL
90015	2002 TX_{264}	—	October 10, 2002	Socorro	LINEAR	V	1.6 km	MPC; JPL
90016	2002 TY_{265}	—	October 10, 2002	Socorro	LINEAR	·	1.8 km	MPC; JPL
90017	2002 TW_{266}	—	October 10, 2002	Socorro	LINEAR	·	1.4 km	MPC; JPL
90018	2002 TP_{275}	—	October 9, 2002	Socorro	LINEAR	·	1.2 km	MPC; JPL
90019	2002 TV_{283}	—	October 10, 2002	Socorro	LINEAR	·	3.4 km	MPC; JPL
90020	2002 TV_{285}	—	October 10, 2002	Socorro	LINEAR	·	1.7 km	MPC; JPL
90021	2002 TR_{286}	—	October 10, 2002	Socorro	LINEAR	·	2.9 km	MPC; JPL
90022 Apache Point	2002 TL_{371}	Apache Point	October 10, 2002	Apache Point	SDSS	·	2.7 km	MPC; JPL
90023	2002 UP_{2}	—	October 28, 2002	Socorro	LINEAR	HNS	3.4 km	MPC; JPL
90024	2002 UT_{7}	—	October 28, 2002	Palomar	NEAT	·	3.5 km	MPC; JPL
90025	2002 UV_{7}	—	October 28, 2002	Palomar	NEAT	·	2.5 km	MPC; JPL
90026	2002 UM_{8}	—	October 28, 2002	Palomar	NEAT	·	3.6 km	MPC; JPL
90027	2002 UM_{18}	—	October 30, 2002	Palomar	NEAT	·	4.2 km	MPC; JPL
90028	2002 UQ_{20}	—	October 28, 2002	Haleakala	NEAT	(2076)	1.3 km	MPC; JPL
90029	2002 UY_{21}	—	October 30, 2002	Haleakala	NEAT	THM	4.5 km	MPC; JPL
90030	2002 UM_{22}	—	October 30, 2002	Haleakala	NEAT	·	6.3 km	MPC; JPL
90031	2002 UH_{25}	—	October 30, 2002	Haleakala	NEAT	·	1.8 km	MPC; JPL
90032	2002 UM_{28}	—	October 30, 2002	Palomar	NEAT	·	4.6 km	MPC; JPL
90033	2002 UT_{31}	—	October 30, 2002	Haleakala	NEAT	·	3.3 km	MPC; JPL
90034	2002 UO_{32}	—	October 30, 2002	Haleakala	NEAT	EUN	2.1 km	MPC; JPL
90035	2002 UQ_{34}	—	October 31, 2002	Kvistaberg	Uppsala-DLR Asteroid Survey	EUN	2.5 km	MPC; JPL
90036	2002 US_{37}	—	October 31, 2002	Palomar	NEAT	·	1.6 km	MPC; JPL
90037	2002 UL_{41}	—	October 31, 2002	Palomar	NEAT	MAS	1.6 km	MPC; JPL
90038	2002 UY_{44}	—	October 31, 2002	Socorro	LINEAR	·	3.3 km	MPC; JPL
90039	2002 UN_{48}	—	October 31, 2002	Socorro	LINEAR	·	2.1 km	MPC; JPL
90040	2002 UN_{49}	—	October 31, 2002	Socorro	LINEAR	·	3.4 km	MPC; JPL
90041	2002 VU	—	November 1, 2002	Haleakala	NEAT	H	1.2 km	MPC; JPL
90042	2002 VW_{1}	—	November 1, 2002	Palomar	NEAT	·	7.7 km	MPC; JPL
90043	2002 VD_{2}	—	November 2, 2002	Kitt Peak	Spacewatch	(5)	2.2 km	MPC; JPL
90044	2002 VN_{2}	—	November 2, 2002	Haleakala	NEAT	·	1.8 km	MPC; JPL
90045	2002 VC_{6}	—	November 4, 2002	Palomar	NEAT	slow	6.7 km	MPC; JPL
90046	2002 VF_{12}	—	November 2, 2002	Palomar	NEAT	·	2.1 km	MPC; JPL
90047	2002 VT_{15}	—	November 5, 2002	Socorro	LINEAR	·	1.8 km	MPC; JPL
90048	2002 VL_{16}	—	November 5, 2002	Socorro	LINEAR	·	4.2 km	MPC; JPL
90049	2002 VM_{18}	—	November 2, 2002	Haleakala	NEAT	·	2.1 km	MPC; JPL
90050	2002 VQ_{23}	—	November 5, 2002	Socorro	LINEAR	·	3.0 km	MPC; JPL
90051	2002 VN_{25}	—	November 5, 2002	Socorro	LINEAR	·	2.4 km	MPC; JPL
90052	2002 VA_{27}	—	November 5, 2002	Socorro	LINEAR	PAD	4.1 km	MPC; JPL
90053	2002 VL_{28}	—	November 5, 2002	Anderson Mesa	LONEOS	LIX	5.5 km	MPC; JPL
90054	2002 VC_{31}	—	November 5, 2002	Socorro	LINEAR	·	3.7 km	MPC; JPL
90055	2002 VY_{36}	—	November 2, 2002	Haleakala	NEAT	slow	5.0 km	MPC; JPL
90056	2002 VP_{38}	—	November 5, 2002	Socorro	LINEAR	·	4.8 km	MPC; JPL
90057	2002 VH_{48}	—	November 5, 2002	Socorro	LINEAR	·	2.9 km	MPC; JPL
90058	2002 VC_{54}	—	November 6, 2002	Socorro	LINEAR	·	1.7 km	MPC; JPL
90059	2002 VW_{56}	—	November 6, 2002	Socorro	LINEAR	·	1.6 km	MPC; JPL
90060	2002 VR_{62}	—	November 5, 2002	Anderson Mesa	LONEOS	·	1.5 km	MPC; JPL
90061	2002 VK_{63}	—	November 6, 2002	Anderson Mesa	LONEOS	·	2.2 km	MPC; JPL
90062	2002 VQ_{64}	—	November 7, 2002	Anderson Mesa	LONEOS	·	6.5 km	MPC; JPL
90063	2002 VW_{64}	—	November 7, 2002	Socorro	LINEAR	·	5.4 km	MPC; JPL
90064	2002 VV_{65}	—	November 7, 2002	Anderson Mesa	LONEOS	·	5.5 km	MPC; JPL
90065	2002 VQ_{74}	—	November 7, 2002	Socorro	LINEAR	HOF	5.1 km	MPC; JPL
90066	2002 VF_{76}	—	November 7, 2002	Socorro	LINEAR	·	1.7 km	MPC; JPL
90067	2002 VS_{76}	—	November 7, 2002	Socorro	LINEAR	EOS	3.9 km	MPC; JPL
90068	2002 VV_{77}	—	November 7, 2002	Socorro	LINEAR	V	1.6 km	MPC; JPL
90069	2002 VK_{79}	—	November 7, 2002	Socorro	LINEAR	·	2.5 km	MPC; JPL
90070	2002 VN_{79}	—	November 7, 2002	Socorro	LINEAR	·	3.0 km	MPC; JPL
90071	2002 VJ_{81}	—	November 7, 2002	Socorro	LINEAR	·	2.5 km	MPC; JPL
90072	2002 VV_{81}	—	November 7, 2002	Socorro	LINEAR	·	2.2 km	MPC; JPL
90073	2002 VH_{83}	—	November 7, 2002	Socorro	LINEAR	·	1.5 km	MPC; JPL
90074	2002 VK_{84}	—	November 7, 2002	Socorro	LINEAR	·	3.9 km	MPC; JPL
90075	2002 VU_{94}	—	November 13, 2002	Palomar	NEAT	APO +1km · PHA	2.2 km	MPC; JPL
90076	2002 VS_{95}	—	November 11, 2002	Anderson Mesa	LONEOS	·	5.9 km	MPC; JPL
90077	2002 VS_{96}	—	November 11, 2002	Socorro	LINEAR	·	4.6 km	MPC; JPL
90078	2002 VX_{97}	—	November 12, 2002	Socorro	LINEAR	·	1.6 km	MPC; JPL
90079	2002 VN_{105}	—	November 12, 2002	Socorro	LINEAR	·	1.9 km	MPC; JPL
90080	2002 VW_{107}	—	November 12, 2002	Socorro	LINEAR	EOS	3.3 km	MPC; JPL
90081	2002 VS_{109}	—	November 12, 2002	Socorro	LINEAR	·	2.4 km	MPC; JPL
90082	2002 VO_{114}	—	November 13, 2002	Palomar	NEAT	·	1.6 km	MPC; JPL
90083	2002 VB_{115}	—	November 11, 2002	Anderson Mesa	LONEOS	·	2.3 km	MPC; JPL
90084	2002 VC_{116}	—	November 11, 2002	Socorro	LINEAR	·	3.4 km	MPC; JPL
90085	2002 VE_{118}	—	November 14, 2002	Palomar	NEAT	PHO	2.2 km	MPC; JPL
90086	2002 VL_{135}	—	November 7, 2002	Socorro	LINEAR	·	1.3 km	MPC; JPL
90087	2002 WS_{2}	—	November 23, 2002	Palomar	NEAT	·	3.6 km	MPC; JPL
90088	2002 WP_{6}	—	November 24, 2002	Palomar	NEAT	·	1.7 km	MPC; JPL
90089	2002 WH_{12}	—	November 27, 2002	Anderson Mesa	LONEOS	·	3.5 km	MPC; JPL
90090	2002 WK_{14}	—	November 28, 2002	Anderson Mesa	LONEOS	·	2.6 km	MPC; JPL
90091	2002 XG_{2}	—	December 1, 2002	Socorro	LINEAR	·	6.4 km	MPC; JPL
90092	2002 XM_{4}	—	December 1, 2002	Haleakala	NEAT	TIR	7.6 km	MPC; JPL
90093	2002 XS_{5}	—	December 1, 2002	Socorro	LINEAR	·	1.7 km	MPC; JPL
90094	2002 XV_{5}	—	December 1, 2002	Socorro	LINEAR	V	1.5 km	MPC; JPL
90095	2002 XB_{7}	—	December 2, 2002	Socorro	LINEAR	·	3.7 km	MPC; JPL
90096	2002 XO_{9}	—	December 2, 2002	Socorro	LINEAR	(5)	2.5 km	MPC; JPL
90097	2002 XU_{9}	—	December 2, 2002	Socorro	LINEAR	·	4.9 km	MPC; JPL
90098	2002 XV_{9}	—	December 2, 2002	Socorro	LINEAR	(5)	4.8 km	MPC; JPL
90099	2002 XL_{10}	—	December 2, 2002	Haleakala	NEAT	·	3.2 km	MPC; JPL
90100	2002 XP_{13}	—	December 3, 2002	Palomar	NEAT	·	2.9 km	MPC; JPL

== 90101–90200 ==
back to top

Designation			Discovery			Properties		Ref
Permanent	Provisional	Named after	Date	Site	Discoverer(s)	Category	Diam.	Ref
90101	2002 XG_{21}	—	December 2, 2002	Socorro	LINEAR	·	2.1 km	MPC; JPL
90102	2002 XQ_{21}	—	December 2, 2002	Socorro	LINEAR	·	3.2 km	MPC; JPL
90103	2002 XK_{25}	—	December 5, 2002	Socorro	LINEAR	·	4.4 km	MPC; JPL
90104	2002 XE_{29}	—	December 5, 2002	Kitt Peak	Spacewatch	EUN	3.0 km	MPC; JPL
90105	2002 XF_{33}	—	December 6, 2002	Palomar	NEAT	·	2.5 km	MPC; JPL
90106	2002 XY_{33}	—	December 5, 2002	Socorro	LINEAR	·	2.2 km	MPC; JPL
90107	2002 XJ_{34}	—	December 5, 2002	Socorro	LINEAR	(5)	2.6 km	MPC; JPL
90108	2002 XB_{35}	—	December 6, 2002	Palomar	NEAT	·	5.0 km	MPC; JPL
90109	2002 XR_{39}	—	December 9, 2002	Desert Eagle	W. K. Y. Yeung	·	1.8 km	MPC; JPL
90110	2002 XH_{44}	—	December 6, 2002	Socorro	LINEAR	·	2.4 km	MPC; JPL
90111	2002 XJ_{44}	—	December 6, 2002	Socorro	LINEAR	ADE	5.8 km	MPC; JPL
90112	2002 XZ_{44}	—	December 7, 2002	Kitt Peak	Spacewatch	·	6.0 km	MPC; JPL
90113	2002 XG_{52}	—	December 10, 2002	Socorro	LINEAR	·	2.0 km	MPC; JPL
90114	2002 XU_{52}	—	December 10, 2002	Socorro	LINEAR	·	2.7 km	MPC; JPL
90115	2002 XJ_{54}	—	December 10, 2002	Palomar	NEAT	·	1.6 km	MPC; JPL
90116	2002 XY_{59}	—	December 10, 2002	Socorro	LINEAR	EOS	5.1 km	MPC; JPL
90117	2002 XG_{60}	—	December 10, 2002	Socorro	LINEAR	·	2.2 km	MPC; JPL
90118	2002 XY_{60}	—	December 10, 2002	Socorro	LINEAR	slow	3.9 km	MPC; JPL
90119	2002 XV_{65}	—	December 12, 2002	Socorro	LINEAR	·	3.1 km	MPC; JPL
90120	2002 XG_{71}	—	December 10, 2002	Socorro	LINEAR	·	3.5 km	MPC; JPL
90121	2002 XO_{72}	—	December 11, 2002	Socorro	LINEAR	·	4.8 km	MPC; JPL
90122	2002 XO_{73}	—	December 11, 2002	Socorro	LINEAR	·	2.2 km	MPC; JPL
90123	2002 XO_{76}	—	December 11, 2002	Socorro	LINEAR	NYS	2.0 km	MPC; JPL
90124	2002 XJ_{80}	—	December 11, 2002	Socorro	LINEAR	·	2.9 km	MPC; JPL
90125 Chrissquire	2002 XR_{80}	Chrissquire	December 11, 2002	Socorro	LINEAR	(5)	2.5 km	MPC; JPL
90126	2002 XC_{81}	—	December 11, 2002	Socorro	LINEAR	·	5.7 km	MPC; JPL
90127	2002 XE_{81}	—	December 11, 2002	Socorro	LINEAR	·	2.9 km	MPC; JPL
90128	2002 XL_{81}	—	December 11, 2002	Socorro	LINEAR	·	9.1 km	MPC; JPL
90129	2002 XQ_{81}	—	December 11, 2002	Socorro	LINEAR	·	2.6 km	MPC; JPL
90130	2002 XK_{82}	—	December 11, 2002	Socorro	LINEAR	·	3.2 km	MPC; JPL
90131	2002 XB_{85}	—	December 11, 2002	Socorro	LINEAR	·	2.7 km	MPC; JPL
90132	2002 XY_{85}	—	December 11, 2002	Socorro	LINEAR	·	1.7 km	MPC; JPL
90133	2002 XV_{86}	—	December 11, 2002	Socorro	LINEAR	MRX	2.1 km	MPC; JPL
90134	2002 XZ_{95}	—	December 5, 2002	Socorro	LINEAR	·	3.2 km	MPC; JPL
90135	2002 XH_{105}	—	December 5, 2002	Socorro	LINEAR	·	3.0 km	MPC; JPL
90136	2002 XO_{105}	—	December 5, 2002	Socorro	LINEAR	·	4.2 km	MPC; JPL
90137	2002 XK_{112}	—	December 6, 2002	Socorro	LINEAR	LIX	7.2 km	MPC; JPL
90138 Diehl	2002 YD	Diehl	December 25, 2002	Desert Moon	Stevens, B. L.	·	1.4 km	MPC; JPL
90139	2002 YA_{1}	—	December 27, 2002	Anderson Mesa	LONEOS	·	4.2 km	MPC; JPL
90140 Gómezdonet	2002 YK_{2}	Gómezdonet	December 28, 2002	Pla D'Arguines	R. Ferrando	V	1.0 km	MPC; JPL
90141	2002 YO_{3}	—	December 28, 2002	Anderson Mesa	LONEOS	TIR	3.5 km	MPC; JPL
90142	2002 YS_{5}	—	December 27, 2002	Anderson Mesa	LONEOS	slow	4.4 km	MPC; JPL
90143	2002 YS_{6}	—	December 28, 2002	Anderson Mesa	LONEOS	·	5.5 km	MPC; JPL
90144	2002 YX_{6}	—	December 28, 2002	Socorro	LINEAR	·	2.7 km	MPC; JPL
90145	2002 YA_{9}	—	December 31, 2002	Socorro	LINEAR	V	2.0 km	MPC; JPL
90146	2002 YZ_{9}	—	December 31, 2002	Socorro	LINEAR	RAF	2.5 km	MPC; JPL
90147	2002 YK_{14}	—	December 31, 2002	Socorro	LINEAR	APO	770 m	MPC; JPL
90148	2002 YL_{14}	—	December 31, 2002	Socorro	LINEAR	GEF	2.8 km	MPC; JPL
90149	2002 YX_{16}	—	December 31, 2002	Socorro	LINEAR	·	1.7 km	MPC; JPL
90150	2002 YP_{17}	—	December 31, 2002	Socorro	LINEAR	·	3.7 km	MPC; JPL
90151	2002 YQ_{20}	—	December 31, 2002	Socorro	LINEAR	·	4.6 km	MPC; JPL
90152	2002 YV_{20}	—	December 31, 2002	Socorro	LINEAR	·	2.2 km	MPC; JPL
90153	2002 YW_{23}	—	December 31, 2002	Socorro	LINEAR	EOS	4.1 km	MPC; JPL
90154	2002 YL_{24}	—	December 31, 2002	Socorro	LINEAR	V	1.5 km	MPC; JPL
90155	2002 YW_{25}	—	December 31, 2002	Socorro	LINEAR	·	4.3 km	MPC; JPL
90156	2002 YS_{29}	—	December 31, 2002	Socorro	LINEAR	LIX	7.5 km	MPC; JPL
90157	2002 YH_{30}	—	December 31, 2002	Socorro	LINEAR	·	2.0 km	MPC; JPL
90158	2002 YL_{30}	—	December 31, 2002	Socorro	LINEAR	·	1.8 km	MPC; JPL
90159	2002 YZ_{30}	—	December 31, 2002	Socorro	LINEAR	·	5.6 km	MPC; JPL
90160	2002 YB_{33}	—	December 29, 2002	Socorro	LINEAR	·	2.3 km	MPC; JPL
90161	2002 YM_{34}	—	December 31, 2002	Socorro	LINEAR	NYS	1.8 km	MPC; JPL
90162	2003 AO_{3}	—	January 1, 2003	Socorro	LINEAR	H	1.1 km	MPC; JPL
90163	2003 AS_{5}	—	January 1, 2003	Socorro	LINEAR	·	6.7 km	MPC; JPL
90164	2003 AD_{6}	—	January 1, 2003	Socorro	LINEAR	H	1.3 km	MPC; JPL
90165	2003 AK_{6}	—	January 1, 2003	Socorro	LINEAR	NYS	2.4 km	MPC; JPL
90166	2003 AR_{6}	—	January 1, 2003	Socorro	LINEAR	·	5.3 km	MPC; JPL
90167	2003 AK_{8}	—	January 3, 2003	Nashville	Clingan, R.	MAS	1.7 km	MPC; JPL
90168	2003 AM_{11}	—	January 1, 2003	Socorro	LINEAR	EUN	2.5 km	MPC; JPL
90169	2003 AF_{12}	—	January 1, 2003	Socorro	LINEAR	·	2.7 km	MPC; JPL
90170	2003 AY_{12}	—	January 1, 2003	Socorro	LINEAR	·	2.5 km	MPC; JPL
90171	2003 AC_{14}	—	January 1, 2003	Socorro	LINEAR	NYS	1.4 km	MPC; JPL
90172	2003 AM_{14}	—	January 2, 2003	Socorro	LINEAR	·	4.3 km	MPC; JPL
90173	2003 AF_{17}	—	January 5, 2003	Socorro	LINEAR	·	2.8 km	MPC; JPL
90174	2003 AK_{19}	—	January 5, 2003	Socorro	LINEAR	·	3.0 km	MPC; JPL
90175	2003 AY_{21}	—	January 5, 2003	Socorro	LINEAR	·	4.1 km	MPC; JPL
90176	2003 AK_{24}	—	January 4, 2003	Socorro	LINEAR	·	7.6 km	MPC; JPL
90177	2003 AK_{25}	—	January 4, 2003	Socorro	LINEAR	·	6.8 km	MPC; JPL
90178	2003 AG_{27}	—	January 4, 2003	Socorro	LINEAR	·	1.8 km	MPC; JPL
90179	2003 AE_{28}	—	January 4, 2003	Socorro	LINEAR	·	2.0 km	MPC; JPL
90180	2003 AT_{28}	—	January 4, 2003	Socorro	LINEAR	·	3.2 km	MPC; JPL
90181	2003 AS_{29}	—	January 4, 2003	Socorro	LINEAR	EOS	4.5 km	MPC; JPL
90182	2003 AY_{29}	—	January 4, 2003	Socorro	LINEAR	EUN · slow	2.8 km	MPC; JPL
90183	2003 AB_{31}	—	January 4, 2003	Socorro	LINEAR	EUN	2.7 km	MPC; JPL
90184	2003 AS_{33}	—	January 5, 2003	Socorro	LINEAR	·	3.2 km	MPC; JPL
90185	2003 AC_{36}	—	January 7, 2003	Socorro	LINEAR	·	2.6 km	MPC; JPL
90186	2003 AV_{36}	—	January 7, 2003	Socorro	LINEAR	V	1.8 km	MPC; JPL
90187	2003 AF_{37}	—	January 7, 2003	Socorro	LINEAR	·	5.9 km	MPC; JPL
90188	2003 AY_{38}	—	January 7, 2003	Socorro	LINEAR	EUN	2.7 km	MPC; JPL
90189	2003 AS_{40}	—	January 7, 2003	Socorro	LINEAR	·	2.1 km	MPC; JPL
90190	2003 AB_{41}	—	January 7, 2003	Socorro	LINEAR	·	4.8 km	MPC; JPL
90191	2003 AC_{41}	—	January 7, 2003	Socorro	LINEAR	·	1.5 km	MPC; JPL
90192	2003 AZ_{41}	—	January 7, 2003	Socorro	LINEAR	·	9.0 km	MPC; JPL
90193	2003 AZ_{50}	—	January 5, 2003	Socorro	LINEAR	·	1.8 km	MPC; JPL
90194	2003 AP_{54}	—	January 5, 2003	Socorro	LINEAR	·	2.7 km	MPC; JPL
90195	2003 AQ_{54}	—	January 5, 2003	Socorro	LINEAR	·	1.9 km	MPC; JPL
90196	2003 AQ_{55}	—	January 5, 2003	Socorro	LINEAR	·	2.2 km	MPC; JPL
90197	2003 AW_{58}	—	January 5, 2003	Socorro	LINEAR	MAR	2.0 km	MPC; JPL
90198	2003 AK_{59}	—	January 5, 2003	Socorro	LINEAR	·	3.4 km	MPC; JPL
90199	2003 AY_{62}	—	January 8, 2003	Socorro	LINEAR	·	6.5 km	MPC; JPL
90200	2003 AO_{63}	—	January 8, 2003	Socorro	LINEAR	·	2.8 km	MPC; JPL

== 90201–90300 ==
back to top

Designation			Discovery			Properties		Ref
Permanent	Provisional	Named after	Date	Site	Discoverer(s)	Category	Diam.	Ref
90201	2003 AW_{64}	—	January 7, 2003	Socorro	LINEAR	·	4.6 km	MPC; JPL
90202	2003 AU_{65}	—	January 7, 2003	Socorro	LINEAR	·	3.4 km	MPC; JPL
90203	2003 AY_{68}	—	January 9, 2003	Socorro	LINEAR	EUN	2.9 km	MPC; JPL
90204	2003 AV_{70}	—	January 10, 2003	Socorro	LINEAR	·	8.3 km	MPC; JPL
90205	2003 AV_{71}	—	January 6, 2003	Needville	Needville	·	2.0 km	MPC; JPL
90206	2003 AO_{72}	—	January 11, 2003	Socorro	LINEAR	H	1.2 km	MPC; JPL
90207	2003 AB_{74}	—	January 10, 2003	Socorro	LINEAR	·	3.7 km	MPC; JPL
90208	2003 AP_{76}	—	January 10, 2003	Socorro	LINEAR	·	3.8 km	MPC; JPL
90209	2003 AM_{78}	—	January 10, 2003	Socorro	LINEAR	·	4.1 km	MPC; JPL
90210	2003 AT_{79}	—	January 11, 2003	Socorro	LINEAR	·	4.6 km	MPC; JPL
90211	2003 AO_{80}	—	January 10, 2003	Socorro	LINEAR	H ·	1.5 km	MPC; JPL
90212	2003 AU_{80}	—	January 12, 2003	Socorro	LINEAR	·	4.8 km	MPC; JPL
90213	2003 AH_{81}	—	January 10, 2003	Socorro	LINEAR	·	3.6 km	MPC; JPL
90214	2003 AP_{81}	—	January 10, 2003	Socorro	LINEAR	·	5.4 km	MPC; JPL
90215	2003 AC_{82}	—	January 12, 2003	Anderson Mesa	LONEOS	H	1.3 km	MPC; JPL
90216	2003 AS_{85}	—	January 11, 2003	Palomar	NEAT	H	1.6 km	MPC; JPL
90217	2003 AH_{87}	—	January 1, 2003	Socorro	LINEAR	·	1.8 km	MPC; JPL
90218	2003 BC	—	January 16, 2003	Anderson Mesa	LONEOS	·	5.8 km	MPC; JPL
90219	2003 BC_{2}	—	January 25, 2003	Anderson Mesa	LONEOS	·	6.4 km	MPC; JPL
90220	2003 BQ_{2}	—	January 26, 2003	Haleakala	NEAT	·	5.1 km	MPC; JPL
90221	2003 BF_{8}	—	January 26, 2003	Anderson Mesa	LONEOS	·	5.8 km	MPC; JPL
90222	2003 BD_{11}	—	January 26, 2003	Anderson Mesa	LONEOS	·	6.3 km	MPC; JPL
90223	2003 BD_{13}	—	January 26, 2003	Anderson Mesa	LONEOS	·	3.7 km	MPC; JPL
90224	2003 BB_{14}	—	January 26, 2003	Haleakala	NEAT	·	1.4 km	MPC; JPL
90225	2003 BH_{14}	—	January 26, 2003	Haleakala	NEAT	·	1.9 km	MPC; JPL
90226 Byronsmith	2003 BS_{15}	Byronsmith	January 26, 2003	Anderson Mesa	LONEOS	·	5.4 km	MPC; JPL
90227	2003 BM_{19}	—	January 26, 2003	Anderson Mesa	LONEOS	·	7.9 km	MPC; JPL
90228	2003 BN_{19}	—	January 26, 2003	Anderson Mesa	LONEOS	·	4.3 km	MPC; JPL
90229	2003 BV_{20}	—	January 27, 2003	Haleakala	NEAT	·	4.3 km	MPC; JPL
90230	2003 BO_{24}	—	January 25, 2003	Palomar	NEAT	·	6.5 km	MPC; JPL
90231	2003 BJ_{25}	—	January 25, 2003	Palomar	NEAT	·	3.6 km	MPC; JPL
90232	2003 BD_{27}	—	January 26, 2003	Anderson Mesa	LONEOS	slow	7.8 km	MPC; JPL
90233	2003 BG_{27}	—	January 26, 2003	Anderson Mesa	LONEOS	EUN	2.8 km	MPC; JPL
90234	2003 BP_{33}	—	January 27, 2003	Haleakala	NEAT	·	3.6 km	MPC; JPL
90235	2003 BF_{35}	—	January 27, 2003	Socorro	LINEAR	CYB	8.8 km	MPC; JPL
90236	2003 BL_{43}	—	January 27, 2003	Socorro	LINEAR	V	1.2 km	MPC; JPL
90237	2003 BR_{44}	—	January 27, 2003	Socorro	LINEAR	·	3.5 km	MPC; JPL
90238	2003 BZ_{44}	—	January 27, 2003	Palomar	NEAT	·	3.2 km	MPC; JPL
90239	2003 BF_{47}	—	January 29, 2003	Palomar	NEAT	MAR	2.3 km	MPC; JPL
90240	2003 BH_{48}	—	January 27, 2003	Socorro	LINEAR	·	4.1 km	MPC; JPL
90241	2003 BG_{49}	—	January 26, 2003	Haleakala	NEAT	EOS	3.9 km	MPC; JPL
90242	2003 BF_{52}	—	January 27, 2003	Socorro	LINEAR	·	5.8 km	MPC; JPL
90243	2003 BZ_{53}	—	January 27, 2003	Socorro	LINEAR	·	5.5 km	MPC; JPL
90244	2003 BA_{59}	—	January 27, 2003	Socorro	LINEAR	·	3.1 km	MPC; JPL
90245	2003 BD_{60}	—	January 27, 2003	Socorro	LINEAR	URS	6.6 km	MPC; JPL
90246	2003 BP_{61}	—	January 27, 2003	Haleakala	NEAT	·	2.2 km	MPC; JPL
90247	2003 BQ_{61}	—	January 27, 2003	Haleakala	NEAT	·	3.5 km	MPC; JPL
90248	2003 BO_{63}	—	January 28, 2003	Kitt Peak	Spacewatch	NYS	2.6 km	MPC; JPL
90249	2003 BU_{63}	—	January 28, 2003	Palomar	NEAT	GEF	2.7 km	MPC; JPL
90250	2003 BY_{63}	—	January 28, 2003	Kitt Peak	Spacewatch	DOR	6.6 km	MPC; JPL
90251	2003 BA_{64}	—	January 28, 2003	Haleakala	NEAT	H	1.2 km	MPC; JPL
90252	2003 BA_{66}	—	January 30, 2003	Kitt Peak	Spacewatch	VER	6.0 km	MPC; JPL
90253	2003 BT_{66}	—	January 30, 2003	Anderson Mesa	LONEOS	·	3.4 km	MPC; JPL
90254	2003 BN_{68}	—	January 28, 2003	Socorro	LINEAR	·	2.8 km	MPC; JPL
90255	2003 BM_{69}	—	January 30, 2003	Anderson Mesa	LONEOS	·	4.4 km	MPC; JPL
90256	2003 BQ_{72}	—	January 28, 2003	Socorro	LINEAR	·	3.0 km	MPC; JPL
90257	2003 BS_{72}	—	January 28, 2003	Palomar	NEAT	·	4.2 km	MPC; JPL
90258	2003 BJ_{80}	—	January 31, 2003	Anderson Mesa	LONEOS	·	8.4 km	MPC; JPL
90259	2003 BU_{81}	—	January 31, 2003	Anderson Mesa	LONEOS	·	4.4 km	MPC; JPL
90260	2003 BC_{83}	—	January 31, 2003	Socorro	LINEAR	VER	6.3 km	MPC; JPL
90261	2003 BG_{83}	—	January 31, 2003	Socorro	LINEAR	GEF	3.0 km	MPC; JPL
90262	2003 BH_{87}	—	January 26, 2003	Kitt Peak	Spacewatch	EOS	3.5 km	MPC; JPL
90263	2003 CO	—	February 1, 2003	Anderson Mesa	LONEOS	·	6.1 km	MPC; JPL
90264	2003 CC_{1}	—	February 1, 2003	Socorro	LINEAR	EOS	4.4 km	MPC; JPL
90265	2003 CL_{5}	—	February 1, 2003	Socorro	LINEAR	·	1.7 km	MPC; JPL
90266	2003 CM_{5}	—	February 1, 2003	Socorro	LINEAR	NYS	1.7 km	MPC; JPL
90267	2003 CW_{6}	—	February 1, 2003	Socorro	LINEAR	VER	5.9 km	MPC; JPL
90268	2003 CT_{8}	—	February 1, 2003	Haleakala	NEAT	NYS	2.7 km	MPC; JPL
90269	2003 CD_{9}	—	February 2, 2003	Socorro	LINEAR	·	6.5 km	MPC; JPL
90270	2003 CX_{9}	—	February 2, 2003	Socorro	LINEAR	·	6.0 km	MPC; JPL
90271	2003 CD_{10}	—	February 2, 2003	Haleakala	NEAT	V	1.1 km	MPC; JPL
90272	2003 CM_{16}	—	February 7, 2003	Desert Eagle	W. K. Y. Yeung	EOS	3.8 km	MPC; JPL
90273	2003 CC_{19}	—	February 8, 2003	Anderson Mesa	LONEOS	·	2.8 km	MPC; JPL
90274	2003 CH_{20}	—	February 9, 2003	Palomar	NEAT	V	2.4 km	MPC; JPL
90275	2003 DM	—	February 19, 2003	Haleakala	NEAT	HYG	6.3 km	MPC; JPL
90276	2003 DE_{2}	—	February 22, 2003	Desert Eagle	W. K. Y. Yeung	·	3.3 km	MPC; JPL
90277	2003 DS_{7}	—	February 22, 2003	Palomar	NEAT	CYB	8.8 km	MPC; JPL
90278 Caprese	2003 DH_{9}	Caprese	February 24, 2003	Campo Imperatore	M. Di Martino, F. Bernardi	·	9.2 km	MPC; JPL
90279 Devětsil	2003 DL_{10}	Devětsil	February 26, 2003	Kleť	KLENOT	EUN	3.6 km	MPC; JPL
90280	2003 DY_{10}	—	February 26, 2003	Socorro	LINEAR	·	4.7 km	MPC; JPL
90281	2003 DQ_{15}	—	February 27, 2003	Haleakala	NEAT	·	2.4 km	MPC; JPL
90282	2003 DS_{20}	—	February 22, 2003	Palomar	NEAT	THM	5.9 km	MPC; JPL
90283	2003 DH_{22}	—	February 28, 2003	Socorro	LINEAR	·	3.0 km	MPC; JPL
90284	2003 EO_{8}	—	March 6, 2003	Anderson Mesa	LONEOS	·	3.2 km	MPC; JPL
90285	2003 EV_{9}	—	March 6, 2003	Anderson Mesa	LONEOS	·	6.3 km	MPC; JPL
90286	2003 EB_{11}	—	March 6, 2003	Socorro	LINEAR	·	6.1 km	MPC; JPL
90287	2003 EV_{12}	—	March 6, 2003	Socorro	LINEAR	·	4.3 km	MPC; JPL
90288 Dalleave	2003 ET_{17}	Dalleave	March 6, 2003	Cima Ekar	ADAS	·	7.3 km	MPC; JPL
90289	2003 EB_{20}	—	March 6, 2003	Anderson Mesa	LONEOS	NYS	2.7 km	MPC; JPL
90290	2003 EX_{20}	—	March 6, 2003	Anderson Mesa	LONEOS	GEF	3.6 km	MPC; JPL
90291	2003 EL_{21}	—	March 6, 2003	Anderson Mesa	LONEOS	·	1.9 km	MPC; JPL
90292	2003 EN_{21}	—	March 6, 2003	Anderson Mesa	LONEOS	·	3.1 km	MPC; JPL
90293	2003 EH_{22}	—	March 6, 2003	Socorro	LINEAR	·	6.4 km	MPC; JPL
90294	2003 EX_{26}	—	March 6, 2003	Anderson Mesa	LONEOS	·	1.9 km	MPC; JPL
90295	2003 ES_{28}	—	March 6, 2003	Socorro	LINEAR	·	5.7 km	MPC; JPL
90296	2003 EY_{29}	—	March 6, 2003	Socorro	LINEAR	·	6.6 km	MPC; JPL
90297	2003 EL_{31}	—	March 7, 2003	Anderson Mesa	LONEOS	NYS	2.4 km	MPC; JPL
90298	2003 EA_{32}	—	March 7, 2003	Socorro	LINEAR	·	2.7 km	MPC; JPL
90299	2003 ED_{34}	—	March 7, 2003	Socorro	LINEAR	·	3.5 km	MPC; JPL
90300	2003 EJ_{40}	—	March 8, 2003	Socorro	LINEAR	·	6.6 km	MPC; JPL

== 90301–90400 ==
back to top

Designation			Discovery			Properties		Ref
Permanent	Provisional	Named after	Date	Site	Discoverer(s)	Category	Diam.	Ref
90301	2003 EN_{45}	—	March 7, 2003	Socorro	LINEAR	·	4.5 km	MPC; JPL
90302	2003 EJ_{48}	—	March 9, 2003	Anderson Mesa	LONEOS	·	4.0 km	MPC; JPL
90303	2003 EL_{49}	—	March 10, 2003	Anderson Mesa	LONEOS	·	2.6 km	MPC; JPL
90304	2003 EM_{53}	—	March 9, 2003	Socorro	LINEAR	·	7.7 km	MPC; JPL
90305	2003 FX	—	March 21, 2003	Palomar	NEAT	·	2.0 km	MPC; JPL
90306	2003 FO_{4}	—	March 26, 2003	Socorro	LINEAR	·	7.3 km	MPC; JPL
90307	2003 FB_{10}	—	March 23, 2003	Kitt Peak	Spacewatch	·	3.9 km	MPC; JPL
90308 Johney	2003 FV_{14}	Johney	March 23, 2003	Catalina	CSS	·	3.7 km	MPC; JPL
90309	2003 FZ_{15}	—	March 23, 2003	Palomar	NEAT	·	3.3 km	MPC; JPL
90310	2003 FH_{16}	—	March 23, 2003	Palomar	NEAT	·	3.2 km	MPC; JPL
90311	2003 FM_{19}	—	March 25, 2003	Palomar	NEAT	RAF	2.2 km	MPC; JPL
90312	2003 FL_{22}	—	March 25, 2003	Kitt Peak	Spacewatch	·	1.9 km	MPC; JPL
90313	2003 FY_{23}	—	March 23, 2003	Kitt Peak	Spacewatch	NYS	2.7 km	MPC; JPL
90314	2003 FL_{36}	—	March 23, 2003	Kitt Peak	Spacewatch	·	6.2 km	MPC; JPL
90315	2003 FK_{37}	—	March 23, 2003	Kitt Peak	Spacewatch	·	2.2 km	MPC; JPL
90316	2003 FZ_{38}	—	March 23, 2003	Haleakala	NEAT	LIX	8.1 km	MPC; JPL
90317 Williamcutlip	2003 FZ_{42}	Williamcutlip	March 23, 2003	Catalina	CSS	V	1.2 km	MPC; JPL
90318	2003 FO_{49}	—	March 24, 2003	Haleakala	NEAT	EOS	3.9 km	MPC; JPL
90319	2003 FO_{50}	—	March 25, 2003	Palomar	NEAT	·	3.1 km	MPC; JPL
90320	2003 FK_{63}	—	March 26, 2003	Palomar	NEAT	·	1.3 km	MPC; JPL
90321	2003 FZ_{67}	—	March 26, 2003	Kitt Peak	Spacewatch	MAR	2.6 km	MPC; JPL
90322	2003 FR_{70}	—	March 26, 2003	Kitt Peak	Spacewatch	·	3.4 km	MPC; JPL
90323	2003 FV_{72}	—	March 26, 2003	Palomar	NEAT	·	5.3 km	MPC; JPL
90324	2003 FL_{74}	—	March 26, 2003	Palomar	NEAT	·	3.5 km	MPC; JPL
90325	2003 FW_{76}	—	March 27, 2003	Palomar	NEAT	·	6.9 km	MPC; JPL
90326	2003 FA_{79}	—	March 27, 2003	Kitt Peak	Spacewatch	·	2.1 km	MPC; JPL
90327	2003 FO_{83}	—	March 27, 2003	Palomar	NEAT	EUN	3.0 km	MPC; JPL
90328 Haryou	2003 FQ_{85}	Haryou	March 28, 2003	Catalina	CSS	V	2.1 km	MPC; JPL
90329	2003 FY_{87}	—	March 28, 2003	Kitt Peak	Spacewatch	·	2.8 km	MPC; JPL
90330	2003 FT_{90}	—	March 29, 2003	Anderson Mesa	LONEOS	V	1.6 km	MPC; JPL
90331	2003 FT_{91}	—	March 29, 2003	Anderson Mesa	LONEOS	·	3.0 km	MPC; JPL
90332	2003 FH_{92}	—	March 29, 2003	Anderson Mesa	LONEOS	MRX	2.5 km	MPC; JPL
90333	2003 FW_{92}	—	March 29, 2003	Anderson Mesa	LONEOS	·	5.0 km	MPC; JPL
90334	2003 FC_{94}	—	March 29, 2003	Socorro	LINEAR	PHO	6.9 km	MPC; JPL
90335	2003 FD_{96}	—	March 30, 2003	Anderson Mesa	LONEOS	·	4.7 km	MPC; JPL
90336	2003 FP_{97}	—	March 30, 2003	Kitt Peak	Spacewatch	·	5.7 km	MPC; JPL
90337	2003 FQ_{97}	—	March 30, 2003	Anderson Mesa	LONEOS	L4	29 km	MPC; JPL
90338	2003 FH_{102}	—	March 31, 2003	Anderson Mesa	LONEOS	V	2.3 km	MPC; JPL
90339	2003 FF_{104}	—	March 25, 2003	Kitt Peak	Spacewatch	EOS	4.4 km	MPC; JPL
90340	2003 FQ_{106}	—	March 27, 2003	Anderson Mesa	LONEOS	·	4.1 km	MPC; JPL
90341	2003 GT_{5}	—	April 1, 2003	Socorro	LINEAR	·	3.0 km	MPC; JPL
90342	2003 GQ_{6}	—	April 2, 2003	Haleakala	NEAT	·	3.2 km	MPC; JPL
90343	2003 GO_{8}	—	April 3, 2003	Anderson Mesa	LONEOS	·	3.4 km	MPC; JPL
90344	2003 GA_{9}	—	April 1, 2003	Socorro	LINEAR	·	2.3 km	MPC; JPL
90345	2003 GC_{14}	—	April 1, 2003	Socorro	LINEAR	V	1.6 km	MPC; JPL
90346	2003 GP_{15}	—	April 3, 2003	Anderson Mesa	LONEOS	·	2.5 km	MPC; JPL
90347	2003 GF_{35}	—	April 8, 2003	Socorro	LINEAR	·	4.1 km	MPC; JPL
90348	2003 GA_{36}	—	April 5, 2003	Anderson Mesa	LONEOS	TIR	3.3 km	MPC; JPL
90349	2003 GV_{39}	—	April 8, 2003	Socorro	LINEAR	·	4.5 km	MPC; JPL
90350	2003 GO_{42}	—	April 6, 2003	Anderson Mesa	LONEOS	·	4.8 km	MPC; JPL
90351	2003 GW_{42}	—	April 9, 2003	Palomar	NEAT	·	7.1 km	MPC; JPL
90352	2003 GK_{49}	—	April 8, 2003	Socorro	LINEAR	·	4.0 km	MPC; JPL
90353	2003 GC_{50}	—	April 7, 2003	Socorro	LINEAR	·	5.1 km	MPC; JPL
90354	2003 GD_{50}	—	April 7, 2003	Socorro	LINEAR	·	3.0 km	MPC; JPL
90355	2003 HC_{12}	—	April 25, 2003	Anderson Mesa	LONEOS	EUN	3.2 km	MPC; JPL
90356	2003 HW_{12}	—	April 24, 2003	Kitt Peak	Spacewatch	·	1.6 km	MPC; JPL
90357	2003 HC_{20}	—	April 26, 2003	Haleakala	NEAT	·	2.9 km	MPC; JPL
90358	2003 HP_{26}	—	April 27, 2003	Socorro	LINEAR	·	6.9 km	MPC; JPL
90359	2003 HY_{31}	—	April 28, 2003	Socorro	LINEAR	EOS	3.9 km	MPC; JPL
90360	2003 HJ_{43}	—	April 29, 2003	Socorro	LINEAR	·	4.5 km	MPC; JPL
90361	2003 HY_{48}	—	April 30, 2003	Socorro	LINEAR	·	2.8 km	MPC; JPL
90362	2003 HZ_{51}	—	April 30, 2003	Kitt Peak	Spacewatch	EOS	3.0 km	MPC; JPL
90363	2003 HH_{52}	—	April 30, 2003	Haleakala	NEAT	·	7.1 km	MPC; JPL
90364	2003 JS_{7}	—	May 2, 2003	Socorro	LINEAR	·	5.1 km	MPC; JPL
90365	2003 JL_{10}	—	May 2, 2003	Socorro	LINEAR	·	3.2 km	MPC; JPL
90366	2003 JJ_{13}	—	May 5, 2003	Anderson Mesa	LONEOS	·	5.7 km	MPC; JPL
90367	2003 LC_{5}	—	June 6, 2003	Socorro	LINEAR	APO +1km	1.7 km	MPC; JPL
90368 Hristopavlov	2003 MG	Hristopavlov	June 19, 2003	Reedy Creek	J. Broughton	(14916)	7.6 km	MPC; JPL
90369	2003 MN_{1}	—	June 23, 2003	Socorro	LINEAR	·	6.8 km	MPC; JPL
90370 Jókaimór	2003 NY_{5}	Jókaimór	July 7, 2003	Piszkéstető	K. Sárneczky, B. Sipőcz	EOS	3.3 km	MPC; JPL
90371	2003 PV_{7}	—	August 2, 2003	Haleakala	NEAT	·	4.7 km	MPC; JPL
90372	2003 QR_{88}	—	August 25, 2003	Socorro	LINEAR	·	12 km	MPC; JPL
90373	2003 SZ_{219}	—	September 28, 2003	Socorro	LINEAR	AMO	610 m	MPC; JPL
90374	2003 UO_{60}	—	October 17, 2003	Anderson Mesa	LONEOS	LIX	7.9 km	MPC; JPL
90375	2003 UX_{257}	—	October 25, 2003	Socorro	LINEAR	EOS	4.2 km	MPC; JPL
90376 Kossuth	2003 VL	Kossuth	November 5, 2003	Piszkéstető	K. Sárneczky, Mészáros, S.	·	4.5 km	MPC; JPL
90377 Sedna	2003 VB_{12}	Sedna	November 14, 2003	Palomar	M. E. Brown, C. A. Trujillo, D. L. Rabinowitz	sednoid	995 km	MPC; JPL
90378	2003 WL_{23}	—	November 18, 2003	Kitt Peak	Spacewatch	·	3.6 km	MPC; JPL
90379	2003 WO_{56}	—	November 20, 2003	Kitt Peak	Spacewatch	·	7.5 km	MPC; JPL
90380	2003 WX_{68}	—	November 19, 2003	Kitt Peak	Spacewatch	L5	18 km	MPC; JPL
90381	2003 WA_{69}	—	November 19, 2003	Kitt Peak	Spacewatch	GEF	2.7 km	MPC; JPL
90382	2003 WL_{73}	—	November 20, 2003	Socorro	LINEAR	NYS	1.6 km	MPC; JPL
90383 Johnloiacono	2003 WN_{89}	Johnloiacono	November 16, 2003	Catalina	CSS	·	2.3 km	MPC; JPL
90384	2003 WV_{112}	—	November 20, 2003	Socorro	LINEAR	·	6.4 km	MPC; JPL
90385	2003 WU_{121}	—	November 20, 2003	Socorro	LINEAR	·	1.6 km	MPC; JPL
90386	2003 WO_{126}	—	November 20, 2003	Socorro	LINEAR	·	2.0 km	MPC; JPL
90387	2003 WY_{140}	—	November 21, 2003	Socorro	LINEAR	·	4.1 km	MPC; JPL
90388 Philchristensen	2003 WY_{152}	Philchristensen	November 24, 2003	Catalina	CSS	MAR	2.9 km	MPC; JPL
90389	2003 WQ_{153}	—	November 28, 2003	Anderson Mesa	LONEOS	GEF	3.1 km	MPC; JPL
90390	2003 XH_{5}	—	December 1, 2003	Kitt Peak	Spacewatch	·	5.0 km	MPC; JPL
90391	2003 XM_{7}	—	December 1, 2003	Socorro	LINEAR	·	2.3 km	MPC; JPL
90392	2003 XB_{12}	—	December 14, 2003	Socorro	LINEAR	·	5.7 km	MPC; JPL
90393	2003 XD_{14}	—	December 15, 2003	Socorro	LINEAR	·	3.9 km	MPC; JPL
90394	2003 XK_{14}	—	December 15, 2003	Socorro	LINEAR	HNS	2.7 km	MPC; JPL
90395	2003 XD_{15}	—	December 1, 2003	Socorro	LINEAR	PHO	2.6 km	MPC; JPL
90396 Franklopez	2003 YA_{4}	Franklopez	December 16, 2003	Catalina	CSS	·	2.6 km	MPC; JPL
90397 Rasch	2003 YW_{4}	Rasch	December 16, 2003	Catalina	CSS	·	2.0 km	MPC; JPL
90398	2003 YA_{16}	—	December 17, 2003	Anderson Mesa	LONEOS	V	1.5 km	MPC; JPL
90399	2003 YN_{16}	—	December 17, 2003	Palomar	NEAT	·	2.8 km	MPC; JPL
90400	2003 YS_{26}	—	December 18, 2003	Kitt Peak	Spacewatch	V	1.2 km	MPC; JPL

== 90401–90500 ==
back to top

Designation			Discovery			Properties		Ref
Permanent	Provisional	Named after	Date	Site	Discoverer(s)	Category	Diam.	Ref
90401	2003 YJ_{43}	—	December 19, 2003	Socorro	LINEAR	·	1.6 km	MPC; JPL
90402	2003 YW_{43}	—	December 19, 2003	Socorro	LINEAR	·	3.8 km	MPC; JPL
90403	2003 YE_{45}	—	December 21, 2003	Catalina	CSS	APO +1km · PHA · slow	570 m	MPC; JPL
90404	2003 YO_{53}	—	December 19, 2003	Socorro	LINEAR	·	2.3 km	MPC; JPL
90405	2003 YW_{53}	—	December 19, 2003	Socorro	LINEAR	·	5.0 km	MPC; JPL
90406	2003 YW_{61}	—	December 19, 2003	Socorro	LINEAR	·	2.6 km	MPC; JPL
90407	2003 YB_{73}	—	December 18, 2003	Socorro	LINEAR	·	4.9 km	MPC; JPL
90408	2003 YG_{79}	—	December 18, 2003	Socorro	LINEAR	·	3.4 km	MPC; JPL
90409	2003 YT_{80}	—	December 18, 2003	Socorro	LINEAR	·	5.8 km	MPC; JPL
90410	2003 YS_{84}	—	December 19, 2003	Kitt Peak	Spacewatch	·	2.5 km	MPC; JPL
90411	2003 YH_{85}	—	December 19, 2003	Socorro	LINEAR	·	1.7 km	MPC; JPL
90412	2003 YY_{90}	—	December 20, 2003	Socorro	LINEAR	DOR	5.3 km	MPC; JPL
90413	2003 YD_{98}	—	December 19, 2003	Socorro	LINEAR	·	3.9 km	MPC; JPL
90414 Karpov	2003 YP_{110}	Karpov	December 19, 2003	Pla D'Arguines	R. Ferrando	V	1.4 km	MPC; JPL
90415	2003 YU_{113}	—	December 23, 2003	Socorro	LINEAR	ADE	4.8 km	MPC; JPL
90416	2003 YK_{118}	—	December 28, 2003	Socorro	LINEAR	APO · PHA	970 m	MPC; JPL
90417	2003 YF_{137}	—	December 27, 2003	Kitt Peak	Spacewatch	·	2.2 km	MPC; JPL
90418	2003 YJ_{137}	—	December 27, 2003	Kitt Peak	Spacewatch	KOR	2.5 km	MPC; JPL
90419	2003 YA_{138}	—	December 27, 2003	Socorro	LINEAR	·	2.2 km	MPC; JPL
90420	2003 YX_{138}	—	December 27, 2003	Kitt Peak	Spacewatch	KOR	3.0 km	MPC; JPL
90421	2003 YD_{139}	—	December 27, 2003	Haleakala	NEAT	EUN	3.0 km	MPC; JPL
90422	2003 YJ_{142}	—	December 28, 2003	Socorro	LINEAR	EUN	4.2 km	MPC; JPL
90423	2003 YH_{149}	—	December 29, 2003	Socorro	LINEAR	·	3.0 km	MPC; JPL
90424	2003 YB_{152}	—	December 29, 2003	Socorro	LINEAR	·	3.2 km	MPC; JPL
90425	2004 AK_{2}	—	January 13, 2004	Anderson Mesa	LONEOS	·	3.3 km	MPC; JPL
90426	2004 AL_{3}	—	January 13, 2004	Anderson Mesa	LONEOS	V	1.4 km	MPC; JPL
90427	2004 BS_{1}	—	January 16, 2004	Palomar	NEAT	·	3.2 km	MPC; JPL
90428	2004 BL_{30}	—	January 18, 2004	Palomar	NEAT	·	3.1 km	MPC; JPL
90429 Wetmore	2004 BW_{37}	Wetmore	January 19, 2004	Catalina	CSS	MAS ·	1.2 km	MPC; JPL
90430	2004 BM_{44}	—	January 22, 2004	Socorro	LINEAR	JUN	2.3 km	MPC; JPL
90431	2004 BY_{55}	—	January 23, 2004	Anderson Mesa	LONEOS	EOS	5.7 km	MPC; JPL
90432	2004 BG_{56}	—	January 23, 2004	Anderson Mesa	LONEOS	·	1.4 km	MPC; JPL
90433	2004 BD_{62}	—	January 22, 2004	Socorro	LINEAR	·	2.0 km	MPC; JPL
90434	2004 BF_{69}	—	January 20, 2004	Kingsnake	J. V. McClusky	·	2.4 km	MPC; JPL
90435	2004 BD_{74}	—	January 24, 2004	Socorro	LINEAR	·	4.5 km	MPC; JPL
90436	2004 BH_{81}	—	January 26, 2004	Anderson Mesa	LONEOS	·	2.9 km	MPC; JPL
90437	2004 BW_{82}	—	January 23, 2004	Socorro	LINEAR	·	3.4 km	MPC; JPL
90438	2004 BP_{83}	—	January 22, 2004	Haleakala	NEAT	PHO	2.6 km	MPC; JPL
90439	2004 BS_{83}	—	January 23, 2004	Socorro	LINEAR	·	3.9 km	MPC; JPL
90440	2004 BV_{83}	—	January 23, 2004	Socorro	LINEAR	EUN · fast	3.0 km	MPC; JPL
90441	2004 BC_{87}	—	January 22, 2004	Socorro	LINEAR	·	2.9 km	MPC; JPL
90442	2004 BR_{89}	—	January 23, 2004	Socorro	LINEAR	·	1.7 km	MPC; JPL
90443	2004 BS_{90}	—	January 24, 2004	Socorro	LINEAR	HYG	6.2 km	MPC; JPL
90444	2004 BQ_{95}	—	January 28, 2004	Socorro	LINEAR	TIR	4.5 km	MPC; JPL
90445	2004 BY_{101}	—	January 29, 2004	Socorro	LINEAR	·	1.9 km	MPC; JPL
90446 Truesdell	2004 BL_{107}	Truesdell	January 28, 2004	Catalina	CSS	·	3.1 km	MPC; JPL
90447 Emans	2004 BB_{109}	Emans	January 28, 2004	Catalina	CSS	V	1.3 km	MPC; JPL
90448	2004 BB_{114}	—	January 29, 2004	Socorro	LINEAR	·	2.1 km	MPC; JPL
90449 Brucestephenson	2004 BR_{116}	Brucestephenson	January 27, 2004	Catalina	CSS	·	7.1 km	MPC; JPL
90450 Cyriltyson	2004 BR_{117}	Cyriltyson	January 28, 2004	Catalina	CSS	fast	4.2 km	MPC; JPL
90451	2004 BK_{122}	—	January 31, 2004	Socorro	LINEAR	·	9.7 km	MPC; JPL
90452	2004 BO_{122}	—	January 29, 2004	Socorro	LINEAR	·	7.6 km	MPC; JPL
90453 Shawnphillips	2004 CM	Shawnphillips	February 6, 2004	Tenagra II	M. Schwartz, P. R. Holvorcem	·	4.5 km	MPC; JPL
90454	2004 CV	—	February 10, 2004	Desert Eagle	W. K. Y. Yeung	slow	2.9 km	MPC; JPL
90455 Irenehernandez	2004 CU_{2}	Irenehernandez	February 12, 2004	Goodricke-Pigott	R. A. Tucker	·	2.8 km	MPC; JPL
90456	2004 CV_{2}	—	February 13, 2004	Goodricke-Pigott	R. A. Tucker	T_{j} (2.99) · 3:2	10 km	MPC; JPL
90457	2004 CY_{7}	—	February 10, 2004	Palomar	NEAT	·	3.3 km	MPC; JPL
90458	2004 CM_{11}	—	February 11, 2004	Palomar	NEAT	CYB	5.6 km	MPC; JPL
90459	2004 CQ_{16}	—	February 11, 2004	Palomar	NEAT	·	5.8 km	MPC; JPL
90460	2004 CD_{35}	—	February 13, 2004	Palomar	NEAT	·	2.2 km	MPC; JPL
90461 Matthewgraham	2004 CS_{35}	Matthewgraham	February 11, 2004	Catalina	CSS	·	3.6 km	MPC; JPL
90462	2004 CA_{36}	—	February 11, 2004	Palomar	NEAT	PHO	2.7 km	MPC; JPL
90463 Johnrichard	2004 CS_{39}	Johnrichard	February 14, 2004	Jornada	Dixon, D. S.	·	3.9 km	MPC; JPL
90464	2004 CA_{42}	—	February 10, 2004	Palomar	NEAT	·	3.9 km	MPC; JPL
90465	2004 CT_{49}	—	February 11, 2004	Kitt Peak	Spacewatch	·	1.4 km	MPC; JPL
90466	2004 CG_{80}	—	February 11, 2004	Palomar	NEAT	·	5.4 km	MPC; JPL
90467	2004 CU_{91}	—	February 13, 2004	Palomar	NEAT	·	2.8 km	MPC; JPL
90468	2004 CV_{91}	—	February 14, 2004	Socorro	LINEAR	·	3.2 km	MPC; JPL
90469	2004 CY_{94}	—	February 12, 2004	Palomar	NEAT	·	2.2 km	MPC; JPL
90470	2004 CH_{97}	—	February 13, 2004	Palomar	NEAT	·	2.4 km	MPC; JPL
90471 Andrewdrake	2004 CF_{98}	Andrewdrake	February 14, 2004	Catalina	CSS	·	2.4 km	MPC; JPL
90472 Mahabal	2004 CT_{99}	Mahabal	February 15, 2004	Catalina	CSS	NYS	2.2 km	MPC; JPL
90473	2004 CT_{102}	—	February 12, 2004	Palomar	NEAT	·	2.8 km	MPC; JPL
90474	2004 CU_{104}	—	February 13, 2004	Palomar	NEAT	·	1.8 km	MPC; JPL
90475	2004 CC_{105}	—	February 13, 2004	Palomar	NEAT	(58892)	7.5 km	MPC; JPL
90476	2004 CE_{105}	—	February 13, 2004	Palomar	NEAT	MAS	1.7 km	MPC; JPL
90477	2004 CH_{106}	—	February 14, 2004	Palomar	NEAT	EUN	3.3 km	MPC; JPL
90478	2004 CX_{108}	—	February 15, 2004	Palomar	NEAT	·	9.9 km	MPC; JPL
90479 Donalek	2004 CC_{109}	Donalek	February 15, 2004	Catalina	CSS	·	4.0 km	MPC; JPL
90480 Ulrich	2004 CG_{109}	Ulrich	February 15, 2004	Catalina	CSS	LUT	8.5 km	MPC; JPL
90481 Wollstonecraft	2004 DA	Wollstonecraft	February 16, 2004	Needville	J. Dellinger, Wells, D.	·	5.6 km	MPC; JPL
90482 Orcus	2004 DW	Orcus	February 17, 2004	Palomar	M. E. Brown, C. A. Trujillo, D. L. Rabinowitz	plutino · moon	910 km	MPC; JPL
90483	2004 DM_{4}	—	February 16, 2004	Kitt Peak	Spacewatch	·	4.7 km	MPC; JPL
90484	2004 DU_{6}	—	February 16, 2004	Kitt Peak	Spacewatch	·	2.3 km	MPC; JPL
90485	2004 DY_{6}	—	February 16, 2004	Kitt Peak	Spacewatch	·	6.7 km	MPC; JPL
90486	2004 DL_{12}	—	February 17, 2004	Haleakala	NEAT	EUN	2.5 km	MPC; JPL
90487 Witherspoon	2004 DW_{12}	Witherspoon	February 16, 2004	Catalina	CSS	·	7.3 km	MPC; JPL
90488	2004 DX_{12}	—	February 16, 2004	Catalina	CSS	·	2.4 km	MPC; JPL
90489	2004 DH_{19}	—	February 17, 2004	Socorro	LINEAR	NYS	1.5 km	MPC; JPL
90490	2004 DU_{20}	—	February 17, 2004	Socorro	LINEAR	·	4.1 km	MPC; JPL
90491	2004 DW_{22}	—	February 18, 2004	Socorro	LINEAR	DOR	4.8 km	MPC; JPL
90492	2004 DQ_{34}	—	February 19, 2004	Socorro	LINEAR	EUN	2.4 km	MPC; JPL
90493	2004 DM_{37}	—	February 19, 2004	Socorro	LINEAR	EUN	2.3 km	MPC; JPL
90494	2004 DY_{40}	—	February 18, 2004	Socorro	LINEAR	·	1.6 km	MPC; JPL
90495	2004 DW_{43}	—	February 23, 2004	Socorro	LINEAR	·	1.6 km	MPC; JPL
90496	2004 DH_{48}	—	February 19, 2004	Socorro	LINEAR	ERI	2.9 km	MPC; JPL
90497	2004 DH_{59}	—	February 23, 2004	Socorro	LINEAR	AGN	2.2 km	MPC; JPL
90498	2004 DC_{71}	—	February 17, 2004	Socorro	LINEAR	H	1.6 km	MPC; JPL
90499	2004 EC_{2}	—	March 12, 2004	Palomar	NEAT	·	1.7 km	MPC; JPL
90500	2004 EG_{4}	—	March 11, 2004	Palomar	NEAT	·	5.8 km	MPC; JPL

== 90501–90600 ==
back to top

Designation			Discovery			Properties		Ref
Permanent	Provisional	Named after	Date	Site	Discoverer(s)	Category	Diam.	Ref
90501	2004 EM_{4}	—	March 11, 2004	Palomar	NEAT	·	6.4 km	MPC; JPL
90502 Buratti	2004 EM_{7}	Buratti	March 12, 2004	Palomar	NEAT	HIL · 3:2	9.1 km	MPC; JPL
90503 Japhethboyce	2004 EP_{10}	Japhethboyce	March 15, 2004	Catalina	CSS	NYS ·	2.9 km	MPC; JPL
90504	2004 EC_{14}	—	March 11, 2004	Palomar	NEAT	·	1.8 km	MPC; JPL
90505	2004 EM_{16}	—	March 12, 2004	Cordell-Lorenz	Cordell-Lorenz	·	1.8 km	MPC; JPL
90506	2004 EU_{17}	—	March 12, 2004	Palomar	NEAT	·	4.1 km	MPC; JPL
90507	2004 EY_{17}	—	March 12, 2004	Palomar	NEAT	EUN	3.0 km	MPC; JPL
90508	2004 EE_{18}	—	March 12, 2004	Palomar	NEAT	·	3.2 km	MPC; JPL
90509	2004 EN_{18}	—	March 13, 2004	Palomar	NEAT	·	3.7 km	MPC; JPL
90510	2004 EW_{20}	—	March 15, 2004	Socorro	LINEAR	·	7.7 km	MPC; JPL
90511	2004 EZ_{31}	—	March 14, 2004	Palomar	NEAT	·	1.6 km	MPC; JPL
90512	2004 EF_{37}	—	March 13, 2004	Palomar	NEAT	·	3.6 km	MPC; JPL
90513	2004 EZ_{37}	—	March 14, 2004	Palomar	NEAT	ADE	6.1 km	MPC; JPL
90514	2004 EU_{42}	—	March 15, 2004	Socorro	LINEAR	EOS	3.5 km	MPC; JPL
90515	2004 ES_{56}	—	March 14, 2004	Palomar	NEAT	·	1.9 km	MPC; JPL
90516	2004 EO_{59}	—	March 15, 2004	Palomar	NEAT	·	2.4 km	MPC; JPL
90517	2004 EF_{60}	—	March 15, 2004	Palomar	NEAT	V	1.2 km	MPC; JPL
90518	2004 EL_{60}	—	March 15, 2004	Palomar	NEAT	·	1.6 km	MPC; JPL
90519	2004 EA_{64}	—	March 13, 2004	Palomar	NEAT	·	9.7 km	MPC; JPL
90520	2004 EZ_{65}	—	March 14, 2004	Socorro	LINEAR	·	3.1 km	MPC; JPL
90521	2004 EK_{66}	—	March 14, 2004	Socorro	LINEAR	EUN	2.4 km	MPC; JPL
90522	2004 EA_{74}	—	March 15, 2004	Socorro	LINEAR	·	7.5 km	MPC; JPL
90523	2004 EX_{79}	—	March 12, 2004	Palomar	NEAT	MAR	2.5 km	MPC; JPL
90524	2004 EV_{92}	—	March 15, 2004	Socorro	LINEAR	·	4.2 km	MPC; JPL
90525 Karijanberg	2004 FB_{2}	Karijanberg	March 17, 2004	Wrightwood	J. W. Young	·	1.4 km	MPC; JPL
90526 Paullorenz	2004 FQ_{11}	Paullorenz	March 16, 2004	Catalina	CSS	V	1.3 km	MPC; JPL
90527	2004 FB_{15}	—	March 16, 2004	Kitt Peak	Spacewatch	·	1.8 km	MPC; JPL
90528 Raywhite	2004 FE_{19}	Raywhite	March 16, 2004	Catalina	CSS	·	3.2 km	MPC; JPL
90529	2004 FN_{19}	—	March 16, 2004	Socorro	LINEAR	·	4.2 km	MPC; JPL
90530	2004 FX_{20}	—	March 16, 2004	Socorro	LINEAR	·	2.4 km	MPC; JPL
90531	2004 FY_{25}	—	March 17, 2004	Socorro	LINEAR	·	1.2 km	MPC; JPL
90532	2004 FC_{28}	—	March 17, 2004	Socorro	LINEAR	·	9.6 km	MPC; JPL
90533 Laurentblind	2004 FB_{29}	Laurentblind	March 28, 2004	Ottmarsheim	C. Rinner	·	2.9 km	MPC; JPL
90534	2004 FW_{39}	—	March 18, 2004	Kitt Peak	Spacewatch	HYG	5.8 km	MPC; JPL
90535	2004 FC_{42}	—	March 17, 2004	Catalina	CSS	EUN	2.2 km	MPC; JPL
90536	2004 FU_{45}	—	March 16, 2004	Kitt Peak	Spacewatch	V	1.5 km	MPC; JPL
90537 Daveholland	2004 FU_{46}	Daveholland	March 17, 2004	Catalina	CSS	·	5.3 km	MPC; JPL
90538	2004 FE_{65}	—	March 19, 2004	Socorro	LINEAR	·	3.0 km	MPC; JPL
90539	2004 FH_{68}	—	March 20, 2004	Socorro	LINEAR	·	3.1 km	MPC; JPL
90540	2004 FH_{92}	—	March 17, 2004	Socorro	LINEAR	·	3.3 km	MPC; JPL
90541	2004 FD_{93}	—	March 19, 2004	Socorro	LINEAR	·	6.3 km	MPC; JPL
90542	2004 FG_{94}	—	March 22, 2004	Socorro	LINEAR	·	10 km	MPC; JPL
90543	2004 FO_{94}	—	March 18, 2004	Palomar	NEAT	·	3.7 km	MPC; JPL
90544	2004 FW_{95}	—	March 23, 2004	Socorro	LINEAR	·	7.2 km	MPC; JPL
90545	2004 FG_{97}	—	March 23, 2004	Socorro	LINEAR	·	1.6 km	MPC; JPL
90546	2004 FW_{109}	—	March 24, 2004	Anderson Mesa	LONEOS	MAS	1.3 km	MPC; JPL
90547	2004 FY_{109}	—	March 24, 2004	Anderson Mesa	LONEOS	·	5.1 km	MPC; JPL
90548	2004 FD_{110}	—	March 24, 2004	Anderson Mesa	LONEOS	V	1.2 km	MPC; JPL
90549	2004 FP_{110}	—	March 25, 2004	Anderson Mesa	LONEOS	·	2.7 km	MPC; JPL
90550	2004 FS_{116}	—	March 23, 2004	Socorro	LINEAR	GEF	2.6 km	MPC; JPL
90551	2004 FR_{121}	—	March 23, 2004	Socorro	LINEAR	T_{j} (2.95)	3.7 km	MPC; JPL
90552	2004 FM_{124}	—	March 27, 2004	Socorro	LINEAR	NYS	1.9 km	MPC; JPL
90553	2004 FQ_{126}	—	March 27, 2004	Socorro	LINEAR	EOS	3.9 km	MPC; JPL
90554	2004 FE_{129}	—	March 28, 2004	Socorro	LINEAR	JUN	2.0 km	MPC; JPL
90555	2004 FM_{131}	—	March 22, 2004	Anderson Mesa	LONEOS	·	3.6 km	MPC; JPL
90556	2004 FO_{138}	—	March 16, 2004	Socorro	LINEAR	PHO	1.9 km	MPC; JPL
90557	2004 FK_{141}	—	March 27, 2004	Socorro	LINEAR	V	1.8 km	MPC; JPL
90558	2004 FV_{142}	—	March 27, 2004	Anderson Mesa	LONEOS	HNS	4.2 km	MPC; JPL
90559	2004 FW_{142}	—	March 27, 2004	Socorro	LINEAR	·	5.2 km	MPC; JPL
90560	2004 FY_{142}	—	March 27, 2004	Socorro	LINEAR	·	3.2 km	MPC; JPL
90561	2004 FQ_{143}	—	March 28, 2004	Socorro	LINEAR	V	1.5 km	MPC; JPL
90562	2004 FR_{143}	—	March 28, 2004	Socorro	LINEAR	·	1.7 km	MPC; JPL
90563	2004 FL_{147}	—	March 29, 2004	Socorro	LINEAR	T_{j} (2.99)	7.2 km	MPC; JPL
90564 Markjarnyk	2004 GJ_{2}	Markjarnyk	April 12, 2004	Siding Spring	SSS	·	8.1 km	MPC; JPL
90565	2004 GA_{3}	—	April 9, 2004	Palomar	NEAT	·	5.3 km	MPC; JPL
90566	2004 GS_{5}	—	April 11, 2004	Palomar	NEAT	·	7.2 km	MPC; JPL
90567	2004 GC_{9}	—	April 12, 2004	Anderson Mesa	LONEOS	·	4.3 km	MPC; JPL
90568 Goibniu	2004 GV_{9}	Goibniu	April 13, 2004	Palomar	NEAT	cubewano (hot)	680 km	MPC; JPL
90569	2004 GY_{14}	—	April 14, 2004	Needville	Needville	L4	20 km	MPC; JPL
90570	2004 GO_{15}	—	April 14, 2004	Socorro	LINEAR	H	920 m	MPC; JPL
90571	2004 GQ_{15}	—	April 14, 2004	Socorro	LINEAR	·	5.7 km	MPC; JPL
90572	2004 GN_{17}	—	April 11, 2004	Palomar	NEAT	T_{j} (2.99) · CYB	10 km	MPC; JPL
90573	2004 GH_{18}	—	April 12, 2004	Catalina	CSS	·	3.6 km	MPC; JPL
90574	2004 GS_{21}	—	April 11, 2004	Palomar	NEAT	ADE	4.2 km	MPC; JPL
90575	2004 GE_{23}	—	April 12, 2004	Kitt Peak	Spacewatch	·	1.6 km	MPC; JPL
90576	2004 GA_{29}	—	April 10, 2004	Catalina	CSS	·	4.2 km	MPC; JPL
90577	2004 GK_{33}	—	April 12, 2004	Palomar	NEAT	·	2.3 km	MPC; JPL
90578	2004 GM_{36}	—	April 13, 2004	Palomar	NEAT	·	4.0 km	MPC; JPL
90579 Gordonnelson	2004 GF_{39}	Gordonnelson	April 15, 2004	Catalina	CSS	·	5.6 km	MPC; JPL
90580	2004 GE_{73}	—	April 15, 2004	Anderson Mesa	LONEOS	·	2.7 km	MPC; JPL
90581	2004 HJ_{6}	—	April 17, 2004	Socorro	LINEAR	·	5.2 km	MPC; JPL
90582	2004 HU_{28}	—	April 20, 2004	Socorro	LINEAR	·	6.4 km	MPC; JPL
90583	2004 HW_{52}	—	April 24, 2004	Haleakala	NEAT	·	4.1 km	MPC; JPL
90584	2030 P-L	—	September 24, 1960	Palomar	C. J. van Houten, I. van Houten-Groeneveld, T. Gehrels	·	2.0 km	MPC; JPL
90585	2032 P-L	—	September 24, 1960	Palomar	C. J. van Houten, I. van Houten-Groeneveld, T. Gehrels	slow?	2.4 km	MPC; JPL
90586	2035 P-L	—	September 24, 1960	Palomar	C. J. van Houten, I. van Houten-Groeneveld, T. Gehrels	NYS	2.2 km	MPC; JPL
90587	2182 P-L	—	September 24, 1960	Palomar	C. J. van Houten, I. van Houten-Groeneveld, T. Gehrels	·	4.5 km	MPC; JPL
90588	2209 P-L	—	September 24, 1960	Palomar	C. J. van Houten, I. van Houten-Groeneveld, T. Gehrels	·	2.8 km	MPC; JPL
90589	2587 P-L	—	September 24, 1960	Palomar	C. J. van Houten, I. van Houten-Groeneveld, T. Gehrels	·	2.3 km	MPC; JPL
90590	2624 P-L	—	September 24, 1960	Palomar	C. J. van Houten, I. van Houten-Groeneveld, T. Gehrels	MAS	1.5 km	MPC; JPL
90591	2659 P-L	—	September 24, 1960	Palomar	C. J. van Houten, I. van Houten-Groeneveld, T. Gehrels	·	1.5 km	MPC; JPL
90592	2801 P-L	—	September 24, 1960	Palomar	C. J. van Houten, I. van Houten-Groeneveld, T. Gehrels	·	2.1 km	MPC; JPL
90593	3003 P-L	—	September 24, 1960	Palomar	C. J. van Houten, I. van Houten-Groeneveld, T. Gehrels	TIR	6.2 km	MPC; JPL
90594	3563 P-L	—	October 17, 1960	Palomar	C. J. van Houten, I. van Houten-Groeneveld, T. Gehrels	·	7.6 km	MPC; JPL
90595	4033 P-L	—	September 24, 1960	Palomar	C. J. van Houten, I. van Houten-Groeneveld, T. Gehrels	NYS	3.3 km	MPC; JPL
90596	4229 P-L	—	September 24, 1960	Palomar	C. J. van Houten, I. van Houten-Groeneveld, T. Gehrels	(159) ·	4.7 km	MPC; JPL
90597	4248 P-L	—	September 24, 1960	Palomar	C. J. van Houten, I. van Houten-Groeneveld, T. Gehrels	·	2.9 km	MPC; JPL
90598	4253 P-L	—	September 24, 1960	Palomar	C. J. van Houten, I. van Houten-Groeneveld, T. Gehrels	·	2.9 km	MPC; JPL
90599	4542 P-L	—	September 24, 1960	Palomar	C. J. van Houten, I. van Houten-Groeneveld, T. Gehrels	·	5.9 km	MPC; JPL
90600	4560 P-L	—	September 24, 1960	Palomar	C. J. van Houten, I. van Houten-Groeneveld, T. Gehrels	PHO	4.6 km	MPC; JPL

== 90601–90700 ==
back to top

Designation			Discovery			Properties		Ref
Permanent	Provisional	Named after	Date	Site	Discoverer(s)	Category	Diam.	Ref
90601	4718 P-L	—	September 24, 1960	Palomar	C. J. van Houten, I. van Houten-Groeneveld, T. Gehrels	·	2.8 km	MPC; JPL
90602	4757 P-L	—	September 24, 1960	Palomar	C. J. van Houten, I. van Houten-Groeneveld, T. Gehrels	·	5.0 km	MPC; JPL
90603	4760 P-L	—	September 24, 1960	Palomar	C. J. van Houten, I. van Houten-Groeneveld, T. Gehrels	·	4.1 km	MPC; JPL
90604	4813 P-L	—	September 24, 1960	Palomar	C. J. van Houten, I. van Houten-Groeneveld, T. Gehrels	·	2.5 km	MPC; JPL
90605	4814 P-L	—	September 24, 1960	Palomar	C. J. van Houten, I. van Houten-Groeneveld, T. Gehrels	KOR	3.0 km	MPC; JPL
90606	4879 P-L	—	September 26, 1960	Palomar	C. J. van Houten, I. van Houten-Groeneveld, T. Gehrels	·	2.4 km	MPC; JPL
90607	4918 P-L	—	September 24, 1960	Palomar	C. J. van Houten, I. van Houten-Groeneveld, T. Gehrels	·	3.6 km	MPC; JPL
90608	5020 P-L	—	October 17, 1960	Palomar	C. J. van Houten, I. van Houten-Groeneveld, T. Gehrels	·	3.2 km	MPC; JPL
90609	5027 P-L	—	October 17, 1960	Palomar	C. J. van Houten, I. van Houten-Groeneveld, T. Gehrels	·	2.7 km	MPC; JPL
90610	6098 P-L	—	September 24, 1960	Palomar	C. J. van Houten, I. van Houten-Groeneveld, T. Gehrels	·	1.3 km	MPC; JPL
90611	6100 P-L	—	September 24, 1960	Palomar	C. J. van Houten, I. van Houten-Groeneveld, T. Gehrels	·	2.1 km	MPC; JPL
90612	6132 P-L	—	September 24, 1960	Palomar	C. J. van Houten, I. van Houten-Groeneveld, T. Gehrels	NYS	1.7 km	MPC; JPL
90613	6187 P-L	—	September 24, 1960	Palomar	C. J. van Houten, I. van Houten-Groeneveld, T. Gehrels	·	3.0 km	MPC; JPL
90614	6646 P-L	—	September 26, 1960	Palomar	C. J. van Houten, I. van Houten-Groeneveld, T. Gehrels	NEM	5.5 km	MPC; JPL
90615	6762 P-L	—	September 24, 1960	Palomar	C. J. van Houten, I. van Houten-Groeneveld, T. Gehrels	·	2.4 km	MPC; JPL
90616	6835 P-L	—	September 24, 1960	Palomar	C. J. van Houten, I. van Houten-Groeneveld, T. Gehrels	KOR	2.8 km	MPC; JPL
90617	9589 P-L	—	October 17, 1960	Palomar	C. J. van Houten, I. van Houten-Groeneveld, T. Gehrels	·	4.4 km	MPC; JPL
90618	1072 T-1	—	March 25, 1971	Palomar	C. J. van Houten, I. van Houten-Groeneveld, T. Gehrels	NYS	1.7 km	MPC; JPL
90619	1227 T-1	—	March 25, 1971	Palomar	C. J. van Houten, I. van Houten-Groeneveld, T. Gehrels	·	2.9 km	MPC; JPL
90620	4342 T-1	—	March 26, 1971	Palomar	C. J. van Houten, I. van Houten-Groeneveld, T. Gehrels	·	3.1 km	MPC; JPL
90621	1007 T-2	—	September 29, 1973	Palomar	C. J. van Houten, I. van Houten-Groeneveld, T. Gehrels	·	3.5 km	MPC; JPL
90622	1155 T-2	—	September 29, 1973	Palomar	C. J. van Houten, I. van Houten-Groeneveld, T. Gehrels	·	2.6 km	MPC; JPL
90623	1202 T-2	—	September 29, 1973	Palomar	C. J. van Houten, I. van Houten-Groeneveld, T. Gehrels	·	2.0 km	MPC; JPL
90624	1270 T-2	—	September 29, 1973	Palomar	C. J. van Houten, I. van Houten-Groeneveld, T. Gehrels	·	1.3 km	MPC; JPL
90625	1336 T-2	—	September 29, 1973	Palomar	C. J. van Houten, I. van Houten-Groeneveld, T. Gehrels	·	3.9 km	MPC; JPL
90626	1483 T-2	—	September 29, 1973	Palomar	C. J. van Houten, I. van Houten-Groeneveld, T. Gehrels	·	6.4 km	MPC; JPL
90627	2090 T-2	—	September 29, 1973	Palomar	C. J. van Houten, I. van Houten-Groeneveld, T. Gehrels	·	1.3 km	MPC; JPL
90628	2135 T-2	—	September 29, 1973	Palomar	C. J. van Houten, I. van Houten-Groeneveld, T. Gehrels	·	4.1 km	MPC; JPL
90629	2149 T-2	—	September 29, 1973	Palomar	C. J. van Houten, I. van Houten-Groeneveld, T. Gehrels	TIR	3.5 km	MPC; JPL
90630	2159 T-2	—	September 29, 1973	Palomar	C. J. van Houten, I. van Houten-Groeneveld, T. Gehrels	·	2.6 km	MPC; JPL
90631	2213 T-2	—	September 29, 1973	Palomar	C. J. van Houten, I. van Houten-Groeneveld, T. Gehrels	·	2.8 km	MPC; JPL
90632	2259 T-2	—	September 29, 1973	Palomar	C. J. van Houten, I. van Houten-Groeneveld, T. Gehrels	·	2.5 km	MPC; JPL
90633	3040 T-2	—	September 30, 1973	Palomar	C. J. van Houten, I. van Houten-Groeneveld, T. Gehrels	·	3.8 km	MPC; JPL
90634	3046 T-2	—	September 30, 1973	Palomar	C. J. van Houten, I. van Houten-Groeneveld, T. Gehrels	·	2.1 km	MPC; JPL
90635	3068 T-2	—	September 30, 1973	Palomar	C. J. van Houten, I. van Houten-Groeneveld, T. Gehrels	·	3.6 km	MPC; JPL
90636	3250 T-2	—	September 30, 1973	Palomar	C. J. van Houten, I. van Houten-Groeneveld, T. Gehrels	·	3.3 km	MPC; JPL
90637	3340 T-2	—	September 25, 1973	Palomar	C. J. van Houten, I. van Houten-Groeneveld, T. Gehrels	·	1.7 km	MPC; JPL
90638	4048 T-2	—	September 29, 1973	Palomar	C. J. van Houten, I. van Houten-Groeneveld, T. Gehrels	·	8.5 km	MPC; JPL
90639	4151 T-2	—	September 29, 1973	Palomar	C. J. van Houten, I. van Houten-Groeneveld, T. Gehrels	V	1.3 km	MPC; JPL
90640	4500 T-2	—	September 30, 1973	Palomar	C. J. van Houten, I. van Houten-Groeneveld, T. Gehrels	KOR	2.7 km	MPC; JPL
90641	4570 T-2	—	September 30, 1973	Palomar	C. J. van Houten, I. van Houten-Groeneveld, T. Gehrels	HYG	6.1 km	MPC; JPL
90642	5093 T-2	—	September 25, 1973	Palomar	C. J. van Houten, I. van Houten-Groeneveld, T. Gehrels	HNS	2.6 km	MPC; JPL
90643	5166 T-2	—	September 25, 1973	Palomar	C. J. van Houten, I. van Houten-Groeneveld, T. Gehrels	·	4.5 km	MPC; JPL
90644	5483 T-2	—	September 30, 1973	Palomar	C. J. van Houten, I. van Houten-Groeneveld, T. Gehrels	·	8.0 km	MPC; JPL
90645	1004 T-3	—	October 16, 1977	Palomar	C. J. van Houten, I. van Houten-Groeneveld, T. Gehrels	·	6.9 km	MPC; JPL
90646	1008 T-3	—	October 17, 1977	Palomar	C. J. van Houten, I. van Houten-Groeneveld, T. Gehrels	·	6.0 km	MPC; JPL
90647	1016 T-3	—	October 17, 1977	Palomar	C. J. van Houten, I. van Houten-Groeneveld, T. Gehrels	·	5.2 km	MPC; JPL
90648	1030 T-3	—	October 17, 1977	Palomar	C. J. van Houten, I. van Houten-Groeneveld, T. Gehrels	·	7.5 km	MPC; JPL
90649	1041 T-3	—	October 17, 1977	Palomar	C. J. van Houten, I. van Houten-Groeneveld, T. Gehrels	·	3.1 km	MPC; JPL
90650	1112 T-3	—	October 17, 1977	Palomar	C. J. van Houten, I. van Houten-Groeneveld, T. Gehrels	·	3.3 km	MPC; JPL
90651	1219 T-3	—	October 17, 1977	Palomar	C. J. van Houten, I. van Houten-Groeneveld, T. Gehrels	·	2.3 km	MPC; JPL
90652	1224 T-3	—	October 17, 1977	Palomar	C. J. van Houten, I. van Houten-Groeneveld, T. Gehrels	·	4.8 km	MPC; JPL
90653	1904 T-3	—	October 17, 1977	Palomar	C. J. van Houten, I. van Houten-Groeneveld, T. Gehrels	·	2.6 km	MPC; JPL
90654	2067 T-3	—	October 16, 1977	Palomar	C. J. van Houten, I. van Houten-Groeneveld, T. Gehrels	·	2.3 km	MPC; JPL
90655	2144 T-3	—	October 16, 1977	Palomar	C. J. van Houten, I. van Houten-Groeneveld, T. Gehrels	·	5.6 km	MPC; JPL
90656	2399 T-3	—	October 16, 1977	Palomar	C. J. van Houten, I. van Houten-Groeneveld, T. Gehrels	BAP	1.8 km	MPC; JPL
90657	2414 T-3	—	October 16, 1977	Palomar	C. J. van Houten, I. van Houten-Groeneveld, T. Gehrels	·	5.3 km	MPC; JPL
90658	2455 T-3	—	October 16, 1977	Palomar	C. J. van Houten, I. van Houten-Groeneveld, T. Gehrels	·	3.0 km	MPC; JPL
90659	3175 T-3	—	October 16, 1977	Palomar	C. J. van Houten, I. van Houten-Groeneveld, T. Gehrels	KOR	3.7 km	MPC; JPL
90660	3314 T-3	—	October 16, 1977	Palomar	C. J. van Houten, I. van Houten-Groeneveld, T. Gehrels	·	5.3 km	MPC; JPL
90661	3853 T-3	—	October 16, 1977	Palomar	C. J. van Houten, I. van Houten-Groeneveld, T. Gehrels	·	6.4 km	MPC; JPL
90662	4087 T-3	—	October 16, 1977	Palomar	C. J. van Houten, I. van Houten-Groeneveld, T. Gehrels	·	2.9 km	MPC; JPL
90663	4257 T-3	—	October 16, 1977	Palomar	C. J. van Houten, I. van Houten-Groeneveld, T. Gehrels	·	2.9 km	MPC; JPL
90664	4283 T-3	—	October 16, 1977	Palomar	C. J. van Houten, I. van Houten-Groeneveld, T. Gehrels	·	7.4 km	MPC; JPL
90665	4299 T-3	—	October 16, 1977	Palomar	C. J. van Houten, I. van Houten-Groeneveld, T. Gehrels	·	2.8 km	MPC; JPL
90666	4374 T-3	—	October 16, 1977	Palomar	C. J. van Houten, I. van Houten-Groeneveld, T. Gehrels	EUN	3.0 km	MPC; JPL
90667	5011 T-3	—	October 16, 1977	Palomar	C. J. van Houten, I. van Houten-Groeneveld, T. Gehrels	V	1.4 km	MPC; JPL
90668	5075 T-3	—	October 16, 1977	Palomar	C. J. van Houten, I. van Houten-Groeneveld, T. Gehrels	·	1.7 km	MPC; JPL
90669	5181 T-3	—	October 16, 1977	Palomar	C. J. van Houten, I. van Houten-Groeneveld, T. Gehrels	·	4.7 km	MPC; JPL
90670	5183 T-3	—	October 16, 1977	Palomar	C. J. van Houten, I. van Houten-Groeneveld, T. Gehrels	GEF	2.5 km	MPC; JPL
90671	5728 T-3	—	October 16, 1977	Palomar	C. J. van Houten, I. van Houten-Groeneveld, T. Gehrels	·	5.1 km	MPC; JPL
90672 Metrorheinneckar	1977 RH	Metrorheinneckar	September 6, 1977	La Silla	L. D. Schmadel	·	5.0 km	MPC; JPL
90673	1977 XK_{3}	—	December 7, 1977	Palomar	S. J. Bus	GEF	2.7 km	MPC; JPL
90674	1978 UD_{5}	—	October 27, 1978	Palomar	C. M. Olmstead	ERI	3.7 km	MPC; JPL
90675	1978 UQ_{6}	—	October 27, 1978	Palomar	C. M. Olmstead	·	2.4 km	MPC; JPL
90676	1978 VA_{9}	—	November 7, 1978	Palomar	E. F. Helin, S. J. Bus	(5)	1.9 km	MPC; JPL
90677	1978 VN_{10}	—	November 7, 1978	Palomar	E. F. Helin, S. J. Bus	·	5.0 km	MPC; JPL
90678	1979 MC_{6}	—	June 25, 1979	Siding Spring	E. F. Helin, S. J. Bus	·	4.2 km	MPC; JPL
90679	1979 MF_{6}	—	June 25, 1979	Siding Spring	E. F. Helin, S. J. Bus	·	1.9 km	MPC; JPL
90680	1981 DE_{3}	—	February 28, 1981	Siding Spring	S. J. Bus	·	3.2 km	MPC; JPL
90681	1981 EG_{4}	—	March 2, 1981	Siding Spring	S. J. Bus	V	2.0 km	MPC; JPL
90682	1981 EF_{6}	—	March 7, 1981	Siding Spring	S. J. Bus	·	3.7 km	MPC; JPL
90683	1981 EQ_{6}	—	March 6, 1981	Siding Spring	S. J. Bus	EUN	2.3 km	MPC; JPL
90684	1981 EY_{6}	—	March 6, 1981	Siding Spring	S. J. Bus	·	5.5 km	MPC; JPL
90685	1981 ET_{9}	—	March 1, 1981	Siding Spring	S. J. Bus	·	1.7 km	MPC; JPL
90686	1981 EF_{19}	—	March 2, 1981	Siding Spring	S. J. Bus	·	2.8 km	MPC; JPL
90687	1981 EY_{23}	—	March 7, 1981	Siding Spring	S. J. Bus	ADE	3.4 km	MPC; JPL
90688	1981 ED_{30}	—	March 2, 1981	Siding Spring	S. J. Bus	CYB	8.7 km	MPC; JPL
90689	1981 EA_{31}	—	March 2, 1981	Siding Spring	S. J. Bus	·	2.7 km	MPC; JPL
90690	1981 EK_{31}	—	March 2, 1981	Siding Spring	S. J. Bus	·	3.9 km	MPC; JPL
90691	1981 EA_{32}	—	March 6, 1981	Siding Spring	S. J. Bus	EOS	4.1 km	MPC; JPL
90692	1981 EJ_{33}	—	March 1, 1981	Siding Spring	S. J. Bus	·	2.1 km	MPC; JPL
90693	1981 EH_{37}	—	March 1, 1981	Siding Spring	S. J. Bus	(5)	2.7 km	MPC; JPL
90694	1981 EV_{37}	—	March 1, 1981	Siding Spring	S. J. Bus	·	2.1 km	MPC; JPL
90695	1981 ES_{39}	—	March 2, 1981	Siding Spring	S. J. Bus	·	5.3 km	MPC; JPL
90696	1981 EQ_{44}	—	March 7, 1981	Siding Spring	S. J. Bus	·	1.5 km	MPC; JPL
90697	1983 RH_{3}	—	September 1, 1983	La Silla	H. Debehogne	·	3.8 km	MPC; JPL
90698 Kościuszko	1984 EA	Kościuszko	March 1, 1984	Anderson Mesa	E. Bowell	·	3.6 km	MPC; JPL
90699	1986 QK	—	August 25, 1986	La Silla	H. Debehogne	·	2.7 km	MPC; JPL
90700	1986 QG_{2}	—	August 28, 1986	La Silla	H. Debehogne	·	2.2 km	MPC; JPL

== 90701–90800 ==
back to top

Designation			Discovery			Properties		Ref
Permanent	Provisional	Named after	Date	Site	Discoverer(s)	Category	Diam.	Ref
90701	1986 RC_{5}	—	September 2, 1986	La Silla	H. Debehogne	·	6.8 km	MPC; JPL
90702	1988 CN_{5}	—	February 13, 1988	La Silla	E. W. Elst	JUN	2.3 km	MPC; JPL
90703 Indulgentia	1988 RO_{3}	Indulgentia	September 8, 1988	Tautenburg Observatory	F. Börngen	·	3.6 km	MPC; JPL
90704	1988 RO_{12}	—	September 14, 1988	Cerro Tololo	S. J. Bus	3:2	13 km	MPC; JPL
90705	1989 AZ_{5}	—	January 4, 1989	Siding Spring	R. H. McNaught	·	2.4 km	MPC; JPL
90706	1989 GN_{2}	—	April 3, 1989	La Silla	E. W. Elst	·	1.4 km	MPC; JPL
90707	1989 GW_{5}	—	April 3, 1989	La Silla	E. W. Elst	·	2.0 km	MPC; JPL
90708	1990 EU	—	March 2, 1990	La Silla	E. W. Elst	·	4.5 km	MPC; JPL
90709 Wettin	1990 TX_{3}	Wettin	October 12, 1990	Tautenburg Observatory	F. Börngen, L. D. Schmadel	DOR	4.4 km	MPC; JPL
90710	1990 TF_{6}	—	October 9, 1990	Siding Spring	R. H. McNaught	·	7.9 km	MPC; JPL
90711 Stotternheim	1990 TB_{10}	Stotternheim	October 10, 1990	Tautenburg Observatory	F. Börngen, L. D. Schmadel	·	1.8 km	MPC; JPL
90712 Wittelsbach	1990 TE_{13}	Wittelsbach	October 12, 1990	Tautenburg Observatory	F. Börngen, L. D. Schmadel	DOR	5.4 km	MPC; JPL
90713 Chajnantor	1990 VE_{3}	Chajnantor	November 11, 1990	Geisei	T. Seki	BAP	2.2 km	MPC; JPL
90714	1990 VJ_{6}	—	November 15, 1990	La Silla	E. W. Elst	·	4.8 km	MPC; JPL
90715	1991 GE_{3}	—	April 8, 1991	La Silla	E. W. Elst	NYS	1.9 km	MPC; JPL
90716	1991 GY_{8}	—	April 8, 1991	La Silla	E. W. Elst	PHO	2.8 km	MPC; JPL
90717 Flanders	1991 PF_{3}	Flanders	August 2, 1991	La Silla	E. W. Elst	·	3.2 km	MPC; JPL
90718 Castel Gandolfo	1991 RW_{3}	Castel Gandolfo	September 12, 1991	Tautenburg Observatory	F. Börngen, L. D. Schmadel	·	4.2 km	MPC; JPL
90719	1991 RZ_{5}	—	September 13, 1991	Palomar	H. E. Holt	·	3.4 km	MPC; JPL
90720	1991 RS_{19}	—	September 14, 1991	Palomar	H. E. Holt	·	3.5 km	MPC; JPL
90721	1991 RC_{29}	—	September 13, 1991	Palomar	H. E. Holt	·	3.2 km	MPC; JPL
90722	1991 TE_{4}	—	October 10, 1991	Palomar	K. J. Lawrence	·	3.6 km	MPC; JPL
90723	1991 TN_{10}	—	October 10, 1991	Kitt Peak	Spacewatch	(17392)	2.3 km	MPC; JPL
90724	1991 VF_{8}	—	November 4, 1991	Kitt Peak	Spacewatch	·	3.8 km	MPC; JPL
90725	1991 VJ_{8}	—	November 4, 1991	Kitt Peak	Spacewatch	·	3.5 km	MPC; JPL
90726	1992 BE_{4}	—	January 29, 1992	Kitt Peak	Spacewatch	·	1.7 km	MPC; JPL
90727	1992 DP_{5}	—	February 29, 1992	La Silla	UESAC	·	3.7 km	MPC; JPL
90728	1992 EW_{8}	—	March 2, 1992	La Silla	UESAC	·	4.8 km	MPC; JPL
90729	1992 ED_{21}	—	March 2, 1992	La Silla	UESAC	·	1.8 km	MPC; JPL
90730	1992 EO_{23}	—	March 2, 1992	La Silla	UESAC	·	1.7 km	MPC; JPL
90731	1992 OC	—	July 26, 1992	Siding Spring	R. H. McNaught	·	2.6 km	MPC; JPL
90732 Opdebeeck	1992 PO	Opdebeeck	August 8, 1992	Caussols	E. W. Elst	·	6.8 km	MPC; JPL
90733	1993 BO_{8}	—	January 21, 1993	Kitt Peak	Spacewatch	·	3.1 km	MPC; JPL
90734	1993 FW_{6}	—	March 17, 1993	La Silla	UESAC	·	4.9 km	MPC; JPL
90735	1993 FC_{10}	—	March 17, 1993	La Silla	UESAC	·	5.0 km	MPC; JPL
90736	1993 FB_{15}	—	March 17, 1993	La Silla	UESAC	GEF	2.8 km	MPC; JPL
90737	1993 FQ_{15}	—	March 17, 1993	La Silla	UESAC	HIL · 3:2	10 km	MPC; JPL
90738	1993 FP_{21}	—	March 21, 1993	La Silla	UESAC	·	4.4 km	MPC; JPL
90739	1993 FM_{31}	—	March 19, 1993	La Silla	UESAC	·	2.6 km	MPC; JPL
90740	1993 FZ_{31}	—	March 19, 1993	La Silla	UESAC	·	4.4 km	MPC; JPL
90741	1993 FE_{36}	—	March 19, 1993	La Silla	UESAC	·	3.5 km	MPC; JPL
90742	1993 FX_{44}	—	March 19, 1993	La Silla	UESAC	·	1.4 km	MPC; JPL
90743	1993 FE_{58}	—	March 19, 1993	La Silla	UESAC	AGN	2.2 km	MPC; JPL
90744	1993 FT_{80}	—	March 18, 1993	La Silla	UESAC	·	3.0 km	MPC; JPL
90745	1993 HW_{2}	—	April 19, 1993	Kitt Peak	Spacewatch	GEF	2.5 km	MPC; JPL
90746	1993 NK_{1}	—	July 12, 1993	La Silla	E. W. Elst	·	1.7 km	MPC; JPL
90747	1993 PP_{2}	—	August 15, 1993	Kitt Peak	Spacewatch	·	7.7 km	MPC; JPL
90748	1993 QL_{4}	—	August 18, 1993	Caussols	E. W. Elst	NYS	2.4 km	MPC; JPL
90749	1993 QZ_{7}	—	August 20, 1993	La Silla	E. W. Elst	·	5.8 km	MPC; JPL
90750	1993 QJ_{8}	—	August 20, 1993	La Silla	E. W. Elst	·	5.8 km	MPC; JPL
90751	1993 QE_{9}	—	August 20, 1993	La Silla	E. W. Elst	·	2.6 km	MPC; JPL
90752	1993 RJ_{1}	—	September 15, 1993	Kitt Peak	Spacewatch	·	2.0 km	MPC; JPL
90753	1993 RX_{4}	—	September 15, 1993	La Silla	E. W. Elst	·	2.4 km	MPC; JPL
90754	1993 RY_{4}	—	September 15, 1993	La Silla	E. W. Elst	·	2.8 km	MPC; JPL
90755	1993 RT_{5}	—	September 15, 1993	La Silla	E. W. Elst	·	4.9 km	MPC; JPL
90756	1993 RH_{9}	—	September 14, 1993	La Silla	H. Debehogne, E. W. Elst	NYS	2.3 km	MPC; JPL
90757	1993 RK_{13}	—	September 14, 1993	La Silla	H. Debehogne, E. W. Elst	·	2.4 km	MPC; JPL
90758	1993 RO_{14}	—	September 15, 1993	La Silla	E. W. Elst	V	1.5 km	MPC; JPL
90759	1993 SZ_{6}	—	September 17, 1993	La Silla	E. W. Elst	·	2.0 km	MPC; JPL
90760	1993 SN_{10}	—	September 22, 1993	La Silla	H. Debehogne, E. W. Elst	NYS	1.7 km	MPC; JPL
90761	1993 SW_{13}	—	September 16, 1993	La Silla	H. Debehogne, E. W. Elst	·	2.0 km	MPC; JPL
90762	1993 TV_{3}	—	October 8, 1993	Kitt Peak	Spacewatch	HYG	6.3 km	MPC; JPL
90763	1993 TB_{6}	—	October 9, 1993	Kitt Peak	Spacewatch	HYG ·	5.3 km	MPC; JPL
90764	1993 TO_{6}	—	October 9, 1993	Kitt Peak	Spacewatch	·	1.9 km	MPC; JPL
90765	1993 TX_{14}	—	October 9, 1993	La Silla	E. W. Elst	THM	5.1 km	MPC; JPL
90766	1993 TN_{16}	—	October 9, 1993	La Silla	E. W. Elst	·	2.2 km	MPC; JPL
90767	1993 TJ_{17}	—	October 9, 1993	La Silla	E. W. Elst	V	1.4 km	MPC; JPL
90768	1993 TV_{17}	—	October 9, 1993	La Silla	E. W. Elst	LIX	8.3 km	MPC; JPL
90769	1993 TO_{20}	—	October 9, 1993	La Silla	E. W. Elst	·	5.2 km	MPC; JPL
90770	1993 TV_{20}	—	October 9, 1993	La Silla	E. W. Elst	·	3.5 km	MPC; JPL
90771	1993 TU_{32}	—	October 9, 1993	La Silla	E. W. Elst	·	2.9 km	MPC; JPL
90772	1993 UH	—	October 19, 1993	Palomar	E. F. Helin	·	8.0 km	MPC; JPL
90773	1993 UT_{1}	—	October 20, 1993	Kitt Peak	Spacewatch	NYS	1.8 km	MPC; JPL
90774	1993 UA_{5}	—	October 20, 1993	La Silla	E. W. Elst	EOS	6.4 km	MPC; JPL
90775	1993 UE_{5}	—	October 20, 1993	La Silla	E. W. Elst	·	2.4 km	MPC; JPL
90776	1993 VW_{2}	—	November 11, 1993	Kushiro	S. Ueda, H. Kaneda	ERI · slow	3.7 km	MPC; JPL
90777	1993 XJ_{3}	—	December 10, 1993	Palomar	C. S. Shoemaker	·	4.2 km	MPC; JPL
90778	1994 CN_{3}	—	February 10, 1994	Kitt Peak	Spacewatch	V	1.2 km	MPC; JPL
90779	1994 CD_{14}	—	February 8, 1994	La Silla	E. W. Elst	·	5.4 km	MPC; JPL
90780	1994 CN_{17}	—	February 8, 1994	La Silla	E. W. Elst	·	2.8 km	MPC; JPL
90781	1994 EE_{6}	—	March 9, 1994	Caussols	E. W. Elst	·	2.7 km	MPC; JPL
90782	1994 GY_{3}	—	April 6, 1994	Kitt Peak	Spacewatch	·	2.2 km	MPC; JPL
90783	1994 GU_{4}	—	April 6, 1994	Kitt Peak	Spacewatch	·	2.8 km	MPC; JPL
90784	1994 HZ	—	April 16, 1994	Kitt Peak	Spacewatch	(5)	2.4 km	MPC; JPL
90785	1994 JU_{2}	—	May 2, 1994	Kitt Peak	Spacewatch	·	4.7 km	MPC; JPL
90786	1994 PT_{17}	—	August 10, 1994	La Silla	E. W. Elst	·	3.2 km	MPC; JPL
90787	1994 PO_{19}	—	August 12, 1994	La Silla	E. W. Elst	·	1.2 km	MPC; JPL
90788	1994 PQ_{20}	—	August 12, 1994	La Silla	E. W. Elst	·	1.1 km	MPC; JPL
90789	1994 PP_{22}	—	August 12, 1994	La Silla	E. W. Elst	·	1.7 km	MPC; JPL
90790	1994 PA_{25}	—	August 12, 1994	La Silla	E. W. Elst	KOR	3.0 km	MPC; JPL
90791	1994 PG_{32}	—	August 12, 1994	La Silla	E. W. Elst	·	1.4 km	MPC; JPL
90792	1994 PC_{33}	—	August 12, 1994	La Silla	E. W. Elst	·	1.4 km	MPC; JPL
90793	1994 PF_{38}	—	August 10, 1994	La Silla	E. W. Elst	·	900 m	MPC; JPL
90794	1994 RK_{26}	—	September 5, 1994	La Silla	E. W. Elst	·	4.6 km	MPC; JPL
90795	1994 ST_{2}	—	September 28, 1994	Kitt Peak	Spacewatch	EOS	3.1 km	MPC; JPL
90796	1994 SC_{11}	—	September 29, 1994	Kitt Peak	Spacewatch	KOR	2.7 km	MPC; JPL
90797	1994 SU_{12}	—	September 29, 1994	Kitt Peak	Spacewatch	·	2.4 km	MPC; JPL
90798	1994 US_{5}	—	October 28, 1994	Kitt Peak	Spacewatch	V	910 m	MPC; JPL
90799	1994 UD_{8}	—	October 28, 1994	Kitt Peak	Spacewatch	·	1.3 km	MPC; JPL
90800	1994 UD_{9}	—	October 28, 1994	Kitt Peak	Spacewatch	·	1.6 km	MPC; JPL

== 90801–90900 ==
back to top

Designation			Discovery			Properties		Ref
Permanent	Provisional	Named after	Date	Site	Discoverer(s)	Category	Diam.	Ref
90801	1994 VU_{5}	—	November 9, 1994	Kitt Peak	Spacewatch	·	1.4 km	MPC; JPL
90802	1994 WY	—	November 25, 1994	Oizumi	T. Kobayashi	·	2.4 km	MPC; JPL
90803	1994 WG_{5}	—	November 28, 1994	Kitt Peak	Spacewatch	·	4.2 km	MPC; JPL
90804	1994 WL_{8}	—	November 28, 1994	Kitt Peak	Spacewatch	TEL	2.6 km	MPC; JPL
90805	1994 WP_{8}	—	November 28, 1994	Kitt Peak	Spacewatch	·	3.8 km	MPC; JPL
90806 Rudaki	1995 AE	Rudaki	January 4, 1995	Colleverde	V. S. Casulli	PHO	2.4 km	MPC; JPL
90807	1995 CF_{6}	—	February 1, 1995	Kitt Peak	Spacewatch	NYS	2.1 km	MPC; JPL
90808	1995 CM_{6}	—	February 1, 1995	Kitt Peak	Spacewatch	·	5.1 km	MPC; JPL
90809	1995 DX_{2}	—	February 24, 1995	Siding Spring	R. H. McNaught	H	920 m	MPC; JPL
90810	1995 DY_{2}	—	February 24, 1995	Siding Spring	R. H. McNaught	H	770 m	MPC; JPL
90811	1995 DC_{5}	—	February 22, 1995	Kitt Peak	Spacewatch	·	1.9 km	MPC; JPL
90812	1995 EH_{3}	—	March 2, 1995	Kitt Peak	Spacewatch	NYS	2.4 km	MPC; JPL
90813	1995 ES_{7}	—	March 2, 1995	Kitt Peak	Spacewatch	·	2.9 km	MPC; JPL
90814	1995 FV_{4}	—	March 23, 1995	Kitt Peak	Spacewatch	HYG	5.0 km	MPC; JPL
90815	1995 FQ_{6}	—	March 23, 1995	Kitt Peak	Spacewatch	·	2.7 km	MPC; JPL
90816	1995 OZ_{3}	—	July 22, 1995	Kitt Peak	Spacewatch	·	4.2 km	MPC; JPL
90817 Doylehall	1995 RO	Doylehall	September 1, 1995	Haleakala	AMOS	·	4.5 km	MPC; JPL
90818 Daverichards	1995 RR	Daverichards	September 14, 1995	Haleakala	AMOS	·	3.4 km	MPC; JPL
90819	1995 SN	—	September 18, 1995	Ondřejov	L. Kotková	DOR	4.3 km	MPC; JPL
90820 McCann	1995 SS_{1}	McCann	September 20, 1995	Haleakala	AMOS	·	2.8 km	MPC; JPL
90821 Augustsedláček	1995 SA_{2}	Augustsedláček	September 26, 1995	Kleť	M. Tichý, Z. Moravec	·	2.5 km	MPC; JPL
90822	1995 SR_{24}	—	September 19, 1995	Kitt Peak	Spacewatch	AGN	1.9 km	MPC; JPL
90823	1995 SX_{45}	—	September 26, 1995	Kitt Peak	Spacewatch	·	2.4 km	MPC; JPL
90824	1995 SF_{53}	—	September 28, 1995	Xinglong	SCAP	·	3.1 km	MPC; JPL
90825 Lizhensheng	1995 SU_{53}	Lizhensheng	September 28, 1995	Xinglong	SCAP	·	3.3 km	MPC; JPL
90826 Xuzhihong	1995 TL_{1}	Xuzhihong	October 14, 1995	Xinglong	SCAP	·	3.3 km	MPC; JPL
90827	1995 TU_{3}	—	October 15, 1995	Kitt Peak	Spacewatch	AGN	2.0 km	MPC; JPL
90828	1995 UH_{2}	—	October 23, 1995	Kleť	Kleť	·	3.3 km	MPC; JPL
90829	1995 UY_{5}	—	October 21, 1995	Kushiro	S. Ueda, H. Kaneda	ADE	6.9 km	MPC; JPL
90830 Beihang	1995 UX_{7}	Beihang	October 25, 1995	Xinglong	SCAP	·	3.3 km	MPC; JPL
90831	1995 UL_{14}	—	October 17, 1995	Kitt Peak	Spacewatch	·	5.6 km	MPC; JPL
90832	1995 UX_{14}	—	October 17, 1995	Kitt Peak	Spacewatch	PAD	4.1 km	MPC; JPL
90833	1995 UQ_{18}	—	October 18, 1995	Kitt Peak	Spacewatch	·	3.6 km	MPC; JPL
90834	1995 UR_{46}	—	October 20, 1995	Caussols	E. W. Elst	WAT	4.2 km	MPC; JPL
90835	1995 UT_{71}	—	October 20, 1995	Kitt Peak	Spacewatch	·	2.9 km	MPC; JPL
90836	1995 VF_{3}	—	November 14, 1995	Kitt Peak	Spacewatch	AGN	2.4 km	MPC; JPL
90837 Raoulvalentini	1995 WT_{4}	Raoulvalentini	November 18, 1995	Bologna	San Vittore	DOR	5.8 km	MPC; JPL
90838	1995 WD_{7}	—	November 21, 1995	Nanyo	T. Okuni	·	5.5 km	MPC; JPL
90839	1995 WN_{7}	—	November 27, 1995	Oizumi	T. Kobayashi	·	4.9 km	MPC; JPL
90840	1995 WY_{12}	—	November 16, 1995	Kitt Peak	Spacewatch	·	4.6 km	MPC; JPL
90841	1995 WT_{13}	—	November 16, 1995	Kitt Peak	Spacewatch	·	4.2 km	MPC; JPL
90842	1995 YZ_{4}	—	December 16, 1995	Kitt Peak	Spacewatch	KOR	2.5 km	MPC; JPL
90843	1995 YZ_{22}	—	December 21, 1995	Haleakala	NEAT	·	1.8 km	MPC; JPL
90844 Todai	1996 AF_{3}	Todai	January 12, 1996	Kiso	I. Sato, M. Abe	·	1.2 km	MPC; JPL
90845	1996 BO_{6}	—	January 18, 1996	Kitt Peak	Spacewatch	·	3.9 km	MPC; JPL
90846	1996 DY	—	February 21, 1996	Oizumi	T. Kobayashi	·	8.4 km	MPC; JPL
90847	1996 EJ_{3}	—	March 11, 1996	Kitt Peak	Spacewatch	URS	7.2 km	MPC; JPL
90848	1996 EP_{7}	—	March 11, 1996	Kitt Peak	Spacewatch	·	1.7 km	MPC; JPL
90849	1996 EU_{9}	—	March 12, 1996	Kitt Peak	Spacewatch	·	1.2 km	MPC; JPL
90850	1996 FM_{1}	—	March 16, 1996	Haleakala	AMOS	·	1.7 km	MPC; JPL
90851	1996 GX	—	April 7, 1996	Xinglong	SCAP	·	1.5 km	MPC; JPL
90852	1996 GS_{4}	—	April 11, 1996	Kitt Peak	Spacewatch	(2076)	2.4 km	MPC; JPL
90853	1996 GF_{5}	—	April 11, 1996	Kitt Peak	Spacewatch	·	1.4 km	MPC; JPL
90854	1996 GT_{8}	—	April 13, 1996	Kitt Peak	Spacewatch	·	1.9 km	MPC; JPL
90855	1996 GZ_{8}	—	April 13, 1996	Kitt Peak	Spacewatch	·	1.6 km	MPC; JPL
90856	1996 GL_{20}	—	April 15, 1996	La Silla	E. W. Elst	·	1.8 km	MPC; JPL
90857	1996 HN_{8}	—	April 17, 1996	La Silla	E. W. Elst	NYS	2.4 km	MPC; JPL
90858	1996 HJ_{19}	—	April 18, 1996	La Silla	E. W. Elst	HYG	5.8 km	MPC; JPL
90859	1996 HH_{20}	—	April 18, 1996	La Silla	E. W. Elst	·	1.7 km	MPC; JPL
90860	1996 HP_{20}	—	April 18, 1996	La Silla	E. W. Elst	MAS	1.5 km	MPC; JPL
90861	1996 JD	—	May 7, 1996	Prescott	P. G. Comba	·	1.6 km	MPC; JPL
90862	1996 KM_{1}	—	May 22, 1996	Macquarie	R. H. McNaught, Child, J. B.	PHO	2.4 km	MPC; JPL
90863	1996 QR_{1}	—	August 17, 1996	Church Stretton	S. P. Laurie	V	1.7 km	MPC; JPL
90864	1996 RJ_{1}	—	September 9, 1996	Prescott	P. G. Comba	·	1.7 km	MPC; JPL
90865	1996 RC_{11}	—	September 8, 1996	Kitt Peak	Spacewatch	MAS	1.5 km	MPC; JPL
90866	1996 RA_{28}	—	September 10, 1996	La Silla	Uppsala-DLR Trojan Survey	H	1.5 km	MPC; JPL
90867	1996 SX_{6}	—	September 21, 1996	Xinglong	SCAP	·	5.0 km	MPC; JPL
90868	1996 SX_{7}	—	September 18, 1996	Xinglong	SCAP	·	2.7 km	MPC; JPL
90869	1996 TC_{16}	—	October 4, 1996	Kitt Peak	Spacewatch	·	1.4 km	MPC; JPL
90870	1996 TJ_{18}	—	October 4, 1996	Kitt Peak	Spacewatch	·	2.0 km	MPC; JPL
90871	1996 TG_{19}	—	October 4, 1996	Kitt Peak	Spacewatch	H	1.1 km	MPC; JPL
90872	1996 TZ_{40}	—	October 8, 1996	La Silla	E. W. Elst	EUN	4.0 km	MPC; JPL
90873	1996 TE_{44}	—	October 6, 1996	Kitt Peak	Spacewatch	·	1.7 km	MPC; JPL
90874	1996 TX_{64}	—	October 3, 1996	La Silla	E. W. Elst	·	4.3 km	MPC; JPL
90875 Hoshitori	1996 VE_{1}	Hoshitori	November 3, 1996	Saji	Saji	·	6.5 km	MPC; JPL
90876	1996 VW_{4}	—	November 13, 1996	Oizumi	T. Kobayashi	·	3.9 km	MPC; JPL
90877	1996 VQ_{5}	—	November 14, 1996	Oohira	T. Urata	·	2.5 km	MPC; JPL
90878	1996 VY_{37}	—	November 1, 1996	Xinglong	SCAP	·	2.4 km	MPC; JPL
90879	1996 WB_{1}	—	November 19, 1996	Oizumi	T. Kobayashi	·	6.2 km	MPC; JPL
90880	1996 WZ_{2}	—	November 30, 1996	Chichibu	N. Satō	·	3.8 km	MPC; JPL
90881	1996 XN_{6}	—	December 3, 1996	Nachi-Katsuura	Y. Shimizu, T. Urata	·	2.7 km	MPC; JPL
90882	1996 XB_{25}	—	December 9, 1996	Kitt Peak	Spacewatch	(5)	3.8 km	MPC; JPL
90883	1996 XB_{26}	—	December 8, 1996	Chichibu	N. Satō	·	4.3 km	MPC; JPL
90884	1996 XC_{36}	—	December 12, 1996	Kitt Peak	Spacewatch	·	4.7 km	MPC; JPL
90885	1996 YR_{2}	—	December 29, 1996	Oizumi	T. Kobayashi	GEF	2.7 km	MPC; JPL
90886	1996 YT_{2}	—	December 18, 1996	Prescott	P. G. Comba	·	2.8 km	MPC; JPL
90887	1997 AH_{2}	—	January 3, 1997	Oizumi	T. Kobayashi	·	3.2 km	MPC; JPL
90888	1997 AB_{3}	—	January 4, 1997	Oizumi	T. Kobayashi	·	3.6 km	MPC; JPL
90889	1997 AQ_{11}	—	January 3, 1997	Kitt Peak	Spacewatch	·	2.8 km	MPC; JPL
90890	1997 AT_{12}	—	January 10, 1997	Oizumi	T. Kobayashi	(5)	6.9 km	MPC; JPL
90891	1997 AE_{15}	—	January 13, 1997	Oizumi	T. Kobayashi	·	2.7 km	MPC; JPL
90892 Betlémská kaple	1997 BC	Betlémská kaple	January 16, 1997	Kleť	M. Tichý	HOF	4.3 km	MPC; JPL
90893	1997 BE	—	January 16, 1997	Kleť	Kleť	EOS	2.9 km	MPC; JPL
90894	1997 BF_{2}	—	January 28, 1997	Farra d'Isonzo	Farra d'Isonzo	·	5.4 km	MPC; JPL
90895	1997 CC_{2}	—	February 2, 1997	Kitt Peak	Spacewatch	·	3.6 km	MPC; JPL
90896	1997 CJ_{3}	—	February 3, 1997	Haleakala	NEAT	·	4.8 km	MPC; JPL
90897	1997 CF_{6}	—	February 1, 1997	Xinglong	SCAP	·	5.7 km	MPC; JPL
90898	1997 CQ_{19}	—	February 11, 1997	Oizumi	T. Kobayashi	·	3.5 km	MPC; JPL
90899	1997 EL_{1}	—	March 3, 1997	Kitt Peak	Spacewatch	·	1.8 km	MPC; JPL
90900	1997 EA_{2}	—	March 4, 1997	Kitt Peak	Spacewatch	·	3.9 km	MPC; JPL

== 90901–91000 ==
back to top

Designation			Discovery			Properties		Ref
Permanent	Provisional	Named after	Date	Site	Discoverer(s)	Category	Diam.	Ref
90901	1997 EJ_{5}	—	March 4, 1997	Kitt Peak	Spacewatch	·	5.7 km	MPC; JPL
90902	1997 EO_{5}	—	March 4, 1997	Kitt Peak	Spacewatch	·	3.1 km	MPC; JPL
90903	1997 EH_{9}	—	March 2, 1997	Kitt Peak	Spacewatch	·	3.6 km	MPC; JPL
90904	1997 EQ_{11}	—	March 4, 1997	Xinglong	SCAP	·	9.8 km	MPC; JPL
90905	1997 EJ_{21}	—	March 4, 1997	Kitt Peak	Spacewatch	·	2.2 km	MPC; JPL
90906	1997 EV_{36}	—	March 5, 1997	Socorro	LINEAR	·	3.8 km	MPC; JPL
90907	1997 GX	—	April 3, 1997	Kleť	Kleť	·	3.3 km	MPC; JPL
90908	1997 GJ_{1}	—	April 2, 1997	Kitt Peak	Spacewatch	·	3.4 km	MPC; JPL
90909	1997 GD_{3}	—	April 7, 1997	Kitt Peak	Spacewatch	·	2.7 km	MPC; JPL
90910	1997 GF_{6}	—	April 2, 1997	Socorro	LINEAR	EUP	6.9 km	MPC; JPL
90911	1997 GF_{13}	—	April 3, 1997	Socorro	LINEAR	·	2.9 km	MPC; JPL
90912	1997 GQ_{33}	—	April 3, 1997	Socorro	LINEAR	·	4.5 km	MPC; JPL
90913	1997 HK_{7}	—	April 30, 1997	Socorro	LINEAR	·	9.8 km	MPC; JPL
90914	1997 HQ_{11}	—	April 30, 1997	Socorro	LINEAR	·	6.8 km	MPC; JPL
90915	1997 HP_{13}	—	April 30, 1997	Socorro	LINEAR	·	970 m	MPC; JPL
90916	1997 LR	—	June 1, 1997	Kitt Peak	Spacewatch	·	1.5 km	MPC; JPL
90917	1997 NU_{2}	—	July 2, 1997	Kitt Peak	Spacewatch	(2076)	2.6 km	MPC; JPL
90918 Jasinski	1997 PF_{1}	Jasinski	August 2, 1997	Castres	Klotz, A.	·	2.2 km	MPC; JPL
90919 Luoliaofu	1997 PA_{5}	Luoliaofu	August 11, 1997	Xinglong	SCAP	·	2.1 km	MPC; JPL
90920	1997 QM_{3}	—	August 30, 1997	Caussols	ODAS	·	2.5 km	MPC; JPL
90921	1997 QP_{4}	—	August 22, 1997	Woomera	F. B. Zoltowski	·	2.2 km	MPC; JPL
90922	1997 RN_{2}	—	September 4, 1997	Caussols	ODAS	·	1.5 km	MPC; JPL
90923	1997 RV_{3}	—	September 1, 1997	Caussols	ODAS	NYS	2.0 km	MPC; JPL
90924	1997 RX_{3}	—	September 1, 1997	Caussols	ODAS	·	1.4 km	MPC; JPL
90925	1997 RK_{5}	—	September 8, 1997	Yatsuka	H. Abe	·	1.6 km	MPC; JPL
90926 Stáhalík	1997 SH_{1}	Stáhalík	September 22, 1997	Kleť	M. Tichý	·	2.1 km	MPC; JPL
90927	1997 SU_{4}	—	September 25, 1997	Dossobuono	Lai, L.	·	1.6 km	MPC; JPL
90928	1997 SS_{8}	—	September 27, 1997	Kitt Peak	Spacewatch	·	1.3 km	MPC; JPL
90929	1997 SQ_{18}	—	September 28, 1997	Kitt Peak	Spacewatch	·	2.5 km	MPC; JPL
90930	1997 SL_{24}	—	September 30, 1997	Kitt Peak	Spacewatch	NYS	2.5 km	MPC; JPL
90931	1997 SR_{32}	—	September 30, 1997	Xinglong	SCAP	·	2.0 km	MPC; JPL
90932	1997 TC_{1}	—	October 3, 1997	Caussols	ODAS	·	1.6 km	MPC; JPL
90933	1997 TX_{7}	—	October 5, 1997	Kleť	Kleť	NYS	3.8 km	MPC; JPL
90934	1997 TD_{10}	—	October 6, 1997	Ondřejov	P. Pravec	·	2.0 km	MPC; JPL
90935	1997 TW_{17}	—	October 6, 1997	Kitami	K. Endate, K. Watanabe	·	1.7 km	MPC; JPL
90936 Neronet	1997 TN_{19}	Neronet	October 11, 1997	Ondřejov	L. Kotková	PHO	3.6 km	MPC; JPL
90937 Josefdufek	1997 TP_{19}	Josefdufek	October 11, 1997	Ondřejov	L. Kotková	·	2.2 km	MPC; JPL
90938	1997 TE_{22}	—	October 5, 1997	Kitt Peak	Spacewatch	·	1.6 km	MPC; JPL
90939	1997 TV_{22}	—	October 6, 1997	Kitt Peak	Spacewatch	·	2.5 km	MPC; JPL
90940	1997 TR_{23}	—	October 9, 1997	Kitt Peak	Spacewatch	V	1.0 km	MPC; JPL
90941	1997 TW_{23}	—	October 11, 1997	Kitt Peak	Spacewatch	·	2.0 km	MPC; JPL
90942	1997 TS_{24}	—	October 9, 1997	Xinglong	SCAP	V	1.3 km	MPC; JPL
90943	1997 UX_{2}	—	October 24, 1997	Prescott	P. G. Comba	·	3.0 km	MPC; JPL
90944 Pujol	1997 UG_{3}	Pujol	October 25, 1997	Castres	Klotz, A.	·	1.6 km	MPC; JPL
90945	1997 UE_{5}	—	October 22, 1997	Xinglong	SCAP	·	1.7 km	MPC; JPL
90946	1997 UX_{16}	—	October 25, 1997	Kitt Peak	Spacewatch	·	1.4 km	MPC; JPL
90947	1997 UD_{24}	—	October 30, 1997	Anderson Mesa	B. A. Skiff	·	2.6 km	MPC; JPL
90948	1997 VF_{4}	—	November 6, 1997	Oizumi	T. Kobayashi	NYS	2.6 km	MPC; JPL
90949	1997 VB_{5}	—	November 6, 1997	Nachi-Katsuura	Y. Shimizu, T. Urata	·	2.6 km	MPC; JPL
90950	1997 VH_{5}	—	November 8, 1997	Oizumi	T. Kobayashi	·	2.9 km	MPC; JPL
90951	1997 VX_{6}	—	November 6, 1997	Chichibu	N. Satō	·	1.7 km	MPC; JPL
90952	1997 VD_{7}	—	November 1, 1997	Xinglong	SCAP	·	2.4 km	MPC; JPL
90953 Hideosaitou	1997 VA_{9}	Hideosaitou	November 7, 1997	Nanyo	T. Okuni	ERI	4.5 km	MPC; JPL
90954	1997 WW_{1}	—	November 19, 1997	Oizumi	T. Kobayashi	NYS	2.4 km	MPC; JPL
90955	1997 WB_{2}	—	November 19, 1997	Chichibu	N. Satō	NYS	2.5 km	MPC; JPL
90956	1997 WB_{3}	—	November 23, 1997	Oizumi	T. Kobayashi	·	2.2 km	MPC; JPL
90957	1997 WS_{4}	—	November 20, 1997	Kitt Peak	Spacewatch	·	2.7 km	MPC; JPL
90958	1997 WQ_{12}	—	November 23, 1997	Kitt Peak	Spacewatch	·	2.3 km	MPC; JPL
90959	1997 WW_{14}	—	November 23, 1997	Kitt Peak	Spacewatch	·	4.4 km	MPC; JPL
90960	1997 WH_{16}	—	November 28, 1997	Haleakala	NEAT	·	3.3 km	MPC; JPL
90961	1997 WY_{17}	—	November 23, 1997	Kitt Peak	Spacewatch	V	1.3 km	MPC; JPL
90962	1997 WE_{19}	—	November 24, 1997	Kitt Peak	Spacewatch	·	2.6 km	MPC; JPL
90963	1997 WW_{20}	—	November 29, 1997	Kitt Peak	Spacewatch	·	1.9 km	MPC; JPL
90964	1997 WF_{22}	—	November 28, 1997	Xinglong	SCAP	NYS	3.2 km	MPC; JPL
90965	1997 WC_{23}	—	November 25, 1997	Kitt Peak	Spacewatch	V	1.6 km	MPC; JPL
90966	1997 WN_{24}	—	November 28, 1997	Kitt Peak	Spacewatch	·	2.3 km	MPC; JPL
90967	1997 WV_{27}	—	November 29, 1997	Kitt Peak	Spacewatch	MAS	1.0 km	MPC; JPL
90968	1997 WG_{28}	—	November 29, 1997	Kitt Peak	Spacewatch	·	1.7 km	MPC; JPL
90969	1997 WR_{33}	—	November 29, 1997	Socorro	LINEAR	·	2.6 km	MPC; JPL
90970	1997 WY_{34}	—	November 29, 1997	Socorro	LINEAR	·	2.4 km	MPC; JPL
90971	1997 WR_{35}	—	November 29, 1997	Socorro	LINEAR	·	2.8 km	MPC; JPL
90972	1997 WX_{35}	—	November 29, 1997	Socorro	LINEAR	NYS	2.2 km	MPC; JPL
90973	1997 WA_{36}	—	November 29, 1997	Socorro	LINEAR	·	2.4 km	MPC; JPL
90974	1997 WH_{36}	—	November 29, 1997	Socorro	LINEAR	·	4.0 km	MPC; JPL
90975	1997 WF_{37}	—	November 29, 1997	Socorro	LINEAR	NYS	2.0 km	MPC; JPL
90976	1997 WH_{38}	—	November 29, 1997	Socorro	LINEAR	(2076)	1.8 km	MPC; JPL
90977	1997 WS_{41}	—	November 29, 1997	Socorro	LINEAR	NYS	2.9 km	MPC; JPL
90978	1997 WY_{45}	—	November 26, 1997	Socorro	LINEAR	PHO	2.7 km	MPC; JPL
90979	1997 WS_{49}	—	November 26, 1997	Socorro	LINEAR	·	2.8 km	MPC; JPL
90980	1997 WM_{53}	—	November 29, 1997	Socorro	LINEAR	V	1.3 km	MPC; JPL
90981	1997 WY_{54}	—	November 29, 1997	Socorro	LINEAR	MAS	1.1 km	MPC; JPL
90982	1997 XE_{2}	—	December 3, 1997	Chichibu	N. Satō	PHO	2.0 km	MPC; JPL
90983	1997 XU_{5}	—	December 6, 1997	Bédoin	P. Antonini	·	1.6 km	MPC; JPL
90984	1997 XF_{6}	—	December 5, 1997	Caussols	ODAS	·	2.1 km	MPC; JPL
90985	1997 XQ_{6}	—	December 5, 1997	Caussols	ODAS	·	2.7 km	MPC; JPL
90986	1997 XS_{10}	—	December 8, 1997	Xinglong	SCAP	·	2.2 km	MPC; JPL
90987	1997 XM_{11}	—	December 15, 1997	Xinglong	SCAP	·	2.0 km	MPC; JPL
90988	1997 XS_{13}	—	December 4, 1997	La Silla	Uppsala-DLR Trojan Survey	NYS	2.4 km	MPC; JPL
90989	1997 YP	—	December 20, 1997	Oizumi	T. Kobayashi	·	2.6 km	MPC; JPL
90990	1997 YT_{3}	—	December 22, 1997	Xinglong	SCAP	·	2.5 km	MPC; JPL
90991	1997 YU_{10}	—	December 24, 1997	Xinglong	SCAP	·	4.0 km	MPC; JPL
90992	1997 YW_{10}	—	December 24, 1997	Xinglong	SCAP	NYS	2.8 km	MPC; JPL
90993	1997 YA_{15}	—	December 28, 1997	Kitt Peak	Spacewatch	NYS	2.1 km	MPC; JPL
90994	1997 YH_{18}	—	December 29, 1997	Xinglong	SCAP	MAS	2.0 km	MPC; JPL
90995	1998 AK	—	January 2, 1998	Nachi-Katsuura	Y. Shimizu, T. Urata	NYS	4.1 km	MPC; JPL
90996	1998 AQ_{7}	—	January 8, 1998	Modra	A. Galád, Pravda, A.	·	2.3 km	MPC; JPL
90997	1998 BC	—	January 16, 1998	Oizumi	T. Kobayashi	·	3.8 km	MPC; JPL
90998	1998 BU	—	January 19, 1998	Oizumi	T. Kobayashi	(5)	3.2 km	MPC; JPL
90999	1998 BE_{6}	—	January 22, 1998	Kitt Peak	Spacewatch	·	2.7 km	MPC; JPL
91000	1998 BO_{7}	—	January 24, 1998	Haleakala	NEAT	·	4.7 km	MPC; JPL

back to top

== See also ==
- Meanings of minor-planet names: 90001–91000
