= List of minor planets: 73001–74000 =

The following is a partial list of minor planets, running from minor-planet number 73001 through 74000, inclusive. The primary data for this and other partial lists is based on JPL's "Small-Body Orbital Elements" and data available from the Minor Planet Center. Critical list information is also provided by the MPC, unless otherwise specified from Lowell Observatory. A detailed description of the table's columns and additional sources are given on the main page including a complete list of every page in this series, and a statistical break-up on the dynamical classification of minor planets.

Also see the summary list of all named bodies in numerical and alphabetical order, and the corresponding naming citations for the number range of this particular list. New namings may only be added to this list after official publication, as the preannouncement of names is condemned by the Working Group for Small Bodies Nomenclature of the International Astronomical Union.

Near-Earth obj.	MBA (inner)	MBA (outer)	Centaur
Mars-crosser	MBA (middle)	Jupiter trojan	Trans-Neptunian obj.
Unclassified

== 73001–73100 ==
Designation			Discovery			Properties		Ref
Permanent	Provisional	Named after	Date	Site	Discoverer(s)	Category	Diam.	Ref
73001	2002 EP_{25}	—	March 10, 2002	Anderson Mesa	LONEOS	·	2.1 km	MPC · JPL
73002	2002 EE_{26}	—	March 10, 2002	Anderson Mesa	LONEOS	·	4.9 km	MPC · JPL
73003	2002 EJ_{26}	—	March 10, 2002	Anderson Mesa	LONEOS	·	1.4 km	MPC · JPL
73004	2002 EC_{28}	—	March 9, 2002	Socorro	LINEAR	·	2.6 km	MPC · JPL
73005	2002 EP_{29}	—	March 9, 2002	Socorro	LINEAR	·	1.5 km	MPC · JPL
73006	2002 ER_{29}	—	March 9, 2002	Socorro	LINEAR	·	2.7 km	MPC · JPL
73007	2002 ET_{29}	—	March 9, 2002	Socorro	LINEAR	·	1.9 km	MPC · JPL
73008	2002 EU_{29}	—	March 9, 2002	Socorro	LINEAR	·	1.2 km	MPC · JPL
73009	2002 EN_{30}	—	March 9, 2002	Socorro	LINEAR	·	3.0 km	MPC · JPL
73010	2002 EU_{43}	—	March 12, 2002	Socorro	LINEAR	V	1.4 km	MPC · JPL
73011	2002 EC_{44}	—	March 12, 2002	Socorro	LINEAR	·	3.8 km	MPC · JPL
73012	2002 EL_{44}	—	March 13, 2002	Socorro	LINEAR	·	2.1 km	MPC · JPL
73013	2002 EZ_{45}	—	March 11, 2002	Palomar	NEAT	V	1.0 km	MPC · JPL
73014	2002 EU_{52}	—	March 9, 2002	Socorro	LINEAR	·	1.8 km	MPC · JPL
73015	2002 ES_{54}	—	March 13, 2002	Kitt Peak	Spacewatch	·	3.1 km	MPC · JPL
73016	2002 ES_{58}	—	March 13, 2002	Socorro	LINEAR	·	3.4 km	MPC · JPL
73017	2002 EL_{60}	—	March 13, 2002	Socorro	LINEAR	·	1.6 km	MPC · JPL
73018	2002 EN_{66}	—	March 13, 2002	Socorro	LINEAR	·	1.5 km	MPC · JPL
73019	2002 ES_{66}	—	March 13, 2002	Socorro	LINEAR	MAS	1.4 km	MPC · JPL
73020	2002 EE_{68}	—	March 13, 2002	Socorro	LINEAR	·	1.2 km	MPC · JPL
73021	2002 EL_{68}	—	March 13, 2002	Socorro	LINEAR	·	1.3 km	MPC · JPL
73022	2002 EU_{68}	—	March 13, 2002	Socorro	LINEAR	·	1.4 km	MPC · JPL
73023	2002 EW_{68}	—	March 13, 2002	Socorro	LINEAR	·	2.8 km	MPC · JPL
73024	2002 EV_{72}	—	March 13, 2002	Socorro	LINEAR	NYS	3.9 km	MPC · JPL
73025	2002 ER_{74}	—	March 13, 2002	Socorro	LINEAR	·	2.4 km	MPC · JPL
73026	2002 EW_{74}	—	March 13, 2002	Socorro	LINEAR	·	2.0 km	MPC · JPL
73027	2002 EZ_{77}	—	March 11, 2002	Kitt Peak	Spacewatch	NYS	2.7 km	MPC · JPL
73028	2002 EK_{78}	—	March 11, 2002	Kitt Peak	Spacewatch	·	2.0 km	MPC · JPL
73029	2002 EW_{78}	—	March 10, 2002	Haleakala	NEAT	·	1.5 km	MPC · JPL
73030	2002 EG_{79}	—	March 10, 2002	Haleakala	NEAT	·	4.1 km	MPC · JPL
73031	2002 EM_{80}	—	March 12, 2002	Palomar	NEAT	·	1.9 km	MPC · JPL
73032	2002 EP_{80}	—	March 12, 2002	Palomar	NEAT	·	1.2 km	MPC · JPL
73033	2002 EM_{81}	—	March 13, 2002	Palomar	NEAT	·	1.4 km	MPC · JPL
73034	2002 EY_{82}	—	March 13, 2002	Palomar	NEAT	NYS	2.4 km	MPC · JPL
73035	2002 EV_{84}	—	March 9, 2002	Socorro	LINEAR	·	4.7 km	MPC · JPL
73036	2002 EP_{86}	—	March 9, 2002	Socorro	LINEAR	NYS	2.4 km	MPC · JPL
73037	2002 EC_{87}	—	March 9, 2002	Socorro	LINEAR	·	2.1 km	MPC · JPL
73038	2002 EK_{87}	—	March 9, 2002	Socorro	LINEAR	·	2.3 km	MPC · JPL
73039	2002 EO_{91}	—	March 12, 2002	Socorro	LINEAR	·	2.2 km	MPC · JPL
73040	2002 EH_{92}	—	March 13, 2002	Socorro	LINEAR	·	2.2 km	MPC · JPL
73041	2002 ES_{94}	—	March 14, 2002	Socorro	LINEAR	·	1.9 km	MPC · JPL
73042	2002 EG_{95}	—	March 14, 2002	Socorro	LINEAR	·	1.7 km	MPC · JPL
73043	2002 EC_{98}	—	March 12, 2002	Socorro	LINEAR	·	2.1 km	MPC · JPL
73044	2002 EG_{99}	—	March 15, 2002	Socorro	LINEAR	·	3.9 km	MPC · JPL
73045	2002 EY_{105}	—	March 9, 2002	Anderson Mesa	LONEOS	·	3.1 km	MPC · JPL
73046 Davidmann	2002 EG_{112}	Davidmann	March 9, 2002	Catalina	CSS	·	1.8 km	MPC · JPL
73047	2002 EK_{114}	—	March 10, 2002	Kitt Peak	Spacewatch	·	1.3 km	MPC · JPL
73048	2002 EA_{115}	—	March 10, 2002	Anderson Mesa	LONEOS	·	1.8 km	MPC · JPL
73049	2002 EP_{115}	—	March 10, 2002	Anderson Mesa	LONEOS	·	2.6 km	MPC · JPL
73050	2002 EQ_{121}	—	March 11, 2002	Haleakala	NEAT	·	3.6 km	MPC · JPL
73051	2002 EQ_{126}	—	March 12, 2002	Anderson Mesa	LONEOS	·	7.8 km	MPC · JPL
73052	2002 EL_{127}	—	March 12, 2002	Socorro	LINEAR	MIS	4.1 km	MPC · JPL
73053	2002 EX_{133}	—	March 13, 2002	Palomar	NEAT	·	2.2 km	MPC · JPL
73054	2002 EO_{153}	—	March 15, 2002	Kitt Peak	Spacewatch	·	1.9 km	MPC · JPL
73055	2002 FG	—	March 16, 2002	Desert Eagle	W. K. Y. Yeung	·	4.4 km	MPC · JPL
73056	2002 FN_{2}	—	March 19, 2002	Desert Eagle	W. K. Y. Yeung	·	1.7 km	MPC · JPL
73057	2002 FS_{2}	—	March 19, 2002	Desert Eagle	W. K. Y. Yeung	ADE	4.7 km	MPC · JPL
73058	2002 FK_{4}	—	March 20, 2002	Desert Eagle	W. K. Y. Yeung	·	2.6 km	MPC · JPL
73059 Kaunas	2002 FO_{5}	Kaunas	March 16, 2002	Moletai	K. Černis, Zdanavicius, J.	·	1.4 km	MPC · JPL
73060	2002 FZ_{7}	—	March 16, 2002	Socorro	LINEAR	·	1.2 km	MPC · JPL
73061	2002 FC_{9}	—	March 16, 2002	Socorro	LINEAR	V	1.9 km	MPC · JPL
73062	2002 FE_{10}	—	March 16, 2002	Socorro	LINEAR	·	1.6 km	MPC · JPL
73063	2002 FG_{10}	—	March 16, 2002	Socorro	LINEAR	NYS	1.6 km	MPC · JPL
73064	2002 FE_{11}	—	March 16, 2002	Socorro	LINEAR	·	1.8 km	MPC · JPL
73065	2002 FR_{15}	—	March 16, 2002	Haleakala	NEAT	·	1.8 km	MPC · JPL
73066	2002 FV_{15}	—	March 16, 2002	Haleakala	NEAT	·	5.3 km	MPC · JPL
73067	2002 FD_{33}	—	March 20, 2002	Socorro	LINEAR	(5)	2.3 km	MPC · JPL
73068	2002 FK_{33}	—	March 20, 2002	Socorro	LINEAR	·	1.7 km	MPC · JPL
73069	2002 FM_{34}	—	March 20, 2002	Socorro	LINEAR	·	5.0 km	MPC · JPL
73070	2002 FB_{35}	—	March 20, 2002	Kitt Peak	Spacewatch	·	1.7 km	MPC · JPL
73071	2002 FB_{37}	—	March 23, 2002	Socorro	LINEAR	·	2.3 km	MPC · JPL
73072	2002 FC_{38}	—	March 30, 2002	Palomar	NEAT	·	1.9 km	MPC · JPL
73073 Jannaleuty	2002 GA_{1}	Jannaleuty	April 4, 2002	Emerald Lane	L. Ball	·	2.0 km	MPC · JPL
73074	2002 GF_{4}	—	April 9, 2002	Socorro	LINEAR	·	1.8 km	MPC · JPL
73075	2002 GL_{4}	—	April 9, 2002	Socorro	LINEAR	H	1.2 km	MPC · JPL
73076	2002 GN_{4}	—	April 9, 2002	Socorro	LINEAR	H	1.4 km	MPC · JPL
73077	2002 GT_{4}	—	April 10, 2002	Socorro	LINEAR	H	1.1 km	MPC · JPL
73078	2002 GR_{8}	—	April 4, 2002	Palomar	NEAT	·	5.0 km	MPC · JPL
73079 Davidbaltimore	2002 GX_{8}	Davidbaltimore	April 14, 2002	Palomar	NEAT	PHO	2.1 km	MPC · JPL
73080	2002 GJ_{9}	—	April 15, 2002	Desert Eagle	W. K. Y. Yeung	·	5.1 km	MPC · JPL
73081	2002 GD_{12}	—	April 15, 2002	Desert Eagle	W. K. Y. Yeung	·	1.6 km	MPC · JPL
73082	2002 GZ_{14}	—	April 15, 2002	Socorro	LINEAR	·	2.8 km	MPC · JPL
73083	2002 GK_{15}	—	April 15, 2002	Socorro	LINEAR	·	2.0 km	MPC · JPL
73084	2002 GX_{16}	—	April 15, 2002	Socorro	LINEAR	·	1.7 km	MPC · JPL
73085	2002 GM_{17}	—	April 15, 2002	Socorro	LINEAR	·	5.9 km	MPC · JPL
73086	2002 GY_{17}	—	April 15, 2002	Socorro	LINEAR	(2076)	4.4 km	MPC · JPL
73087	2002 GA_{18}	—	April 15, 2002	Socorro	LINEAR	·	2.4 km	MPC · JPL
73088	2002 GD_{18}	—	April 15, 2002	Socorro	LINEAR	·	2.1 km	MPC · JPL
73089	2002 GT_{18}	—	April 14, 2002	Socorro	LINEAR	·	1.6 km	MPC · JPL
73090	2002 GT_{19}	—	April 14, 2002	Socorro	LINEAR	·	2.9 km	MPC · JPL
73091	2002 GW_{19}	—	April 14, 2002	Socorro	LINEAR	·	2.2 km	MPC · JPL
73092	2002 GZ_{19}	—	April 14, 2002	Socorro	LINEAR	EUN	3.7 km	MPC · JPL
73093	2002 GG_{20}	—	April 14, 2002	Socorro	LINEAR	·	2.2 km	MPC · JPL
73094	2002 GN_{20}	—	April 14, 2002	Socorro	LINEAR	·	1.8 km	MPC · JPL
73095	2002 GS_{20}	—	April 14, 2002	Socorro	LINEAR	·	1.6 km	MPC · JPL
73096	2002 GU_{20}	—	April 14, 2002	Socorro	LINEAR	MAS	1.3 km	MPC · JPL
73097	2002 GN_{21}	—	April 14, 2002	Socorro	LINEAR	·	1.7 km	MPC · JPL
73098	2002 GP_{21}	—	April 14, 2002	Socorro	LINEAR	·	2.1 km	MPC · JPL
73099	2002 GR_{21}	—	April 14, 2002	Socorro	LINEAR	·	2.1 km	MPC · JPL
73100	2002 GT_{21}	—	April 14, 2002	Socorro	LINEAR	·	1.7 km	MPC · JPL

== 73101–73200 ==
back to top

Designation			Discovery			Properties		Ref
Permanent	Provisional	Named after	Date	Site	Discoverer(s)	Category	Diam.	Ref
73101	2002 GZ_{21}	—	April 14, 2002	Socorro	LINEAR	·	2.0 km	MPC · JPL
73102	2002 GC_{24}	—	April 15, 2002	Palomar	NEAT	·	1.9 km	MPC · JPL
73103	2002 GZ_{24}	—	April 13, 2002	Kitt Peak	Spacewatch	·	1.1 km	MPC · JPL
73104	2002 GO_{25}	—	April 12, 2002	Socorro	LINEAR	·	4.2 km	MPC · JPL
73105	2002 GR_{25}	—	April 12, 2002	Socorro	LINEAR	·	5.3 km	MPC · JPL
73106	2002 GV_{25}	—	April 14, 2002	Socorro	LINEAR	·	2.1 km	MPC · JPL
73107	2002 GL_{26}	—	April 14, 2002	Socorro	LINEAR	·	2.1 km	MPC · JPL
73108	2002 GS_{36}	—	April 2, 2002	Kitt Peak	Spacewatch	·	1.6 km	MPC · JPL
73109	2002 GD_{37}	—	April 2, 2002	Palomar	NEAT	·	3.1 km	MPC · JPL
73110	2002 GT_{38}	—	April 2, 2002	Kitt Peak	Spacewatch	·	1.7 km	MPC · JPL
73111	2002 GK_{40}	—	April 4, 2002	Palomar	NEAT	NYS	1.8 km	MPC · JPL
73112	2002 GE_{43}	—	April 4, 2002	Palomar	NEAT	·	1.2 km	MPC · JPL
73113	2002 GS_{43}	—	April 4, 2002	Kitt Peak	Spacewatch	MAS	1.5 km	MPC · JPL
73114	2002 GQ_{44}	—	April 4, 2002	Haleakala	NEAT	V	1.6 km	MPC · JPL
73115	2002 GP_{45}	—	April 4, 2002	Haleakala	NEAT	·	2.4 km	MPC · JPL
73116	2002 GD_{49}	—	April 4, 2002	Palomar	NEAT	·	2.4 km	MPC · JPL
73117	2002 GF_{51}	—	April 5, 2002	Anderson Mesa	LONEOS	NYS	2.1 km	MPC · JPL
73118	2002 GV_{53}	—	April 5, 2002	Anderson Mesa	LONEOS	·	1.4 km	MPC · JPL
73119	2002 GZ_{53}	—	April 5, 2002	Anderson Mesa	LONEOS	·	3.3 km	MPC · JPL
73120	2002 GS_{55}	—	April 5, 2002	Palomar	NEAT	V	1.5 km	MPC · JPL
73121	2002 GN_{56}	—	April 5, 2002	Palomar	NEAT	V	1.3 km	MPC · JPL
73122	2002 GO_{57}	—	April 8, 2002	Palomar	NEAT	BRG	4.1 km	MPC · JPL
73123	2002 GS_{58}	—	April 8, 2002	Palomar	NEAT	V	1.3 km	MPC · JPL
73124	2002 GB_{60}	—	April 8, 2002	Socorro	LINEAR	EUN	3.6 km	MPC · JPL
73125	2002 GJ_{63}	—	April 8, 2002	Palomar	NEAT	·	2.2 km	MPC · JPL
73126	2002 GB_{65}	—	April 8, 2002	Palomar	NEAT	·	2.0 km	MPC · JPL
73127	2002 GD_{68}	—	April 8, 2002	Socorro	LINEAR	·	3.7 km	MPC · JPL
73128	2002 GE_{68}	—	April 8, 2002	Socorro	LINEAR	·	3.1 km	MPC · JPL
73129	2002 GM_{71}	—	April 9, 2002	Anderson Mesa	LONEOS	·	4.5 km	MPC · JPL
73130	2002 GW_{73}	—	April 9, 2002	Anderson Mesa	LONEOS	·	1.6 km	MPC · JPL
73131	2002 GE_{74}	—	April 9, 2002	Socorro	LINEAR	·	1.9 km	MPC · JPL
73132	2002 GK_{74}	—	April 9, 2002	Socorro	LINEAR	V	1.4 km	MPC · JPL
73133	2002 GD_{75}	—	April 9, 2002	Socorro	LINEAR	·	1.6 km	MPC · JPL
73134	2002 GE_{75}	—	April 9, 2002	Socorro	LINEAR	·	2.3 km	MPC · JPL
73135	2002 GG_{75}	—	April 9, 2002	Socorro	LINEAR	NYS	2.2 km	MPC · JPL
73136	2002 GX_{75}	—	April 9, 2002	Socorro	LINEAR	V	1.4 km	MPC · JPL
73137	2002 GK_{76}	—	April 9, 2002	Kitt Peak	Spacewatch	EUN	2.4 km	MPC · JPL
73138	2002 GO_{76}	—	April 9, 2002	Socorro	LINEAR	·	2.7 km	MPC · JPL
73139	2002 GM_{84}	—	April 10, 2002	Socorro	LINEAR	·	2.6 km	MPC · JPL
73140	2002 GH_{87}	—	April 10, 2002	Socorro	LINEAR	·	1.6 km	MPC · JPL
73141	2002 GK_{87}	—	April 10, 2002	Socorro	LINEAR	·	2.5 km	MPC · JPL
73142	2002 GU_{87}	—	April 10, 2002	Socorro	LINEAR	·	3.3 km	MPC · JPL
73143	2002 GF_{89}	—	April 10, 2002	Socorro	LINEAR	·	3.5 km	MPC · JPL
73144	2002 GP_{95}	—	April 9, 2002	Socorro	LINEAR	·	2.4 km	MPC · JPL
73145	2002 GQ_{95}	—	April 9, 2002	Socorro	LINEAR	DOR	5.1 km	MPC · JPL
73146	2002 GJ_{98}	—	April 10, 2002	Socorro	LINEAR	·	2.0 km	MPC · JPL
73147	2002 GS_{98}	—	April 10, 2002	Socorro	LINEAR	·	2.6 km	MPC · JPL
73148	2002 GH_{99}	—	April 10, 2002	Socorro	LINEAR	·	1.8 km	MPC · JPL
73149	2002 GC_{100}	—	April 10, 2002	Socorro	LINEAR	(1338) (FLO)	1.7 km	MPC · JPL
73150	2002 GX_{100}	—	April 10, 2002	Socorro	LINEAR	·	2.0 km	MPC · JPL
73151	2002 GO_{102}	—	April 10, 2002	Socorro	LINEAR	·	3.9 km	MPC · JPL
73152	2002 GV_{102}	—	April 10, 2002	Socorro	LINEAR	EUN	2.1 km	MPC · JPL
73153	2002 GM_{105}	—	April 11, 2002	Anderson Mesa	LONEOS	V	1.6 km	MPC · JPL
73154	2002 GD_{110}	—	April 10, 2002	Socorro	LINEAR	NYS	1.6 km	MPC · JPL
73155	2002 GU_{110}	—	April 10, 2002	Socorro	LINEAR	·	2.4 km	MPC · JPL
73156	2002 GZ_{122}	—	April 10, 2002	Socorro	LINEAR	·	2.4 km	MPC · JPL
73157	2002 GB_{127}	—	April 12, 2002	Palomar	NEAT	·	2.1 km	MPC · JPL
73158	2002 GN_{138}	—	April 12, 2002	Haleakala	NEAT	EUN	2.2 km	MPC · JPL
73159	2002 GY_{140}	—	April 13, 2002	Kitt Peak	Spacewatch	·	2.0 km	MPC · JPL
73160	2002 GZ_{143}	—	April 13, 2002	Palomar	NEAT	·	1.2 km	MPC · JPL
73161	2002 GC_{146}	—	April 12, 2002	Haleakala	NEAT	·	2.2 km	MPC · JPL
73162	2002 GA_{151}	—	April 14, 2002	Socorro	LINEAR	·	1.6 km	MPC · JPL
73163	2002 GK_{152}	—	April 12, 2002	Palomar	NEAT	ADE	6.2 km	MPC · JPL
73164	2002 GL_{154}	—	April 13, 2002	Palomar	NEAT	V	1.5 km	MPC · JPL
73165	2002 GE_{166}	—	April 15, 2002	Anderson Mesa	LONEOS	·	4.1 km	MPC · JPL
73166	2002 GF_{166}	—	April 15, 2002	Kitt Peak	Spacewatch	MAR	2.3 km	MPC · JPL
73167	2002 GC_{167}	—	April 9, 2002	Socorro	LINEAR	·	1.5 km	MPC · JPL
73168	2002 GM_{170}	—	April 9, 2002	Socorro	LINEAR	·	4.1 km	MPC · JPL
73169	2002 GE_{174}	—	April 10, 2002	Socorro	LINEAR	·	4.0 km	MPC · JPL
73170	2002 HQ_{1}	—	April 16, 2002	Socorro	LINEAR	·	2.3 km	MPC · JPL
73171	2002 HE_{2}	—	April 16, 2002	Socorro	LINEAR	·	2.4 km	MPC · JPL
73172	2002 HG_{2}	—	April 16, 2002	Socorro	LINEAR	·	2.1 km	MPC · JPL
73173	2002 HV_{2}	—	April 16, 2002	Socorro	LINEAR	V	1.6 km	MPC · JPL
73174	2002 HG_{3}	—	April 16, 2002	Socorro	LINEAR	·	2.8 km	MPC · JPL
73175	2002 HH_{5}	—	April 16, 2002	Socorro	LINEAR	·	4.7 km	MPC · JPL
73176	2002 HW_{6}	—	April 18, 2002	Haleakala	NEAT	·	2.0 km	MPC · JPL
73177	2002 HK_{7}	—	April 18, 2002	Desert Eagle	W. K. Y. Yeung	·	5.2 km	MPC · JPL
73178	2002 HH_{10}	—	April 17, 2002	Socorro	LINEAR	MAS	1.6 km	MPC · JPL
73179	2002 HO_{10}	—	April 21, 2002	Socorro	LINEAR	·	2.3 km	MPC · JPL
73180	2002 HY_{10}	—	April 18, 2002	Haleakala	NEAT	ADE	4.2 km	MPC · JPL
73181	2002 HB_{12}	—	April 29, 2002	Palomar	NEAT	·	2.1 km	MPC · JPL
73182	2002 HY_{14}	—	April 17, 2002	Socorro	LINEAR	MAS	1.3 km	MPC · JPL
73183	2002 HT_{15}	—	April 17, 2002	Socorro	LINEAR	·	4.0 km	MPC · JPL
73184	2002 JN	—	May 3, 2002	Desert Eagle	W. K. Y. Yeung	·	5.2 km	MPC · JPL
73185	2002 JP	—	May 3, 2002	Desert Eagle	W. K. Y. Yeung	·	2.1 km	MPC · JPL
73186	2002 JQ	—	May 3, 2002	Desert Eagle	W. K. Y. Yeung	·	4.4 km	MPC · JPL
73187	2002 JS	—	May 3, 2002	Desert Eagle	W. K. Y. Yeung	·	4.6 km	MPC · JPL
73188	2002 JU	—	May 3, 2002	Desert Eagle	W. K. Y. Yeung	·	1.8 km	MPC · JPL
73189	2002 JV	—	May 3, 2002	Desert Eagle	W. K. Y. Yeung	·	3.6 km	MPC · JPL
73190	2002 JJ_{1}	—	May 3, 2002	Kitt Peak	Spacewatch	·	1.6 km	MPC · JPL
73191	2002 JY_{1}	—	May 4, 2002	Desert Eagle	W. K. Y. Yeung	·	3.4 km	MPC · JPL
73192	2002 JE_{3}	—	May 4, 2002	Kitt Peak	Spacewatch	·	2.0 km	MPC · JPL
73193	2002 JQ_{5}	—	May 5, 2002	Palomar	NEAT	·	2.8 km	MPC · JPL
73194	2002 JY_{7}	—	May 6, 2002	Palomar	NEAT	·	1.9 km	MPC · JPL
73195	2002 JQ_{10}	—	May 7, 2002	Socorro	LINEAR	·	1.8 km	MPC · JPL
73196	2002 JZ_{10}	—	May 8, 2002	Emerald Lane	L. Ball	·	2.6 km	MPC · JPL
73197	2002 JL_{12}	—	May 5, 2002	Desert Eagle	W. K. Y. Yeung	HNS	3.4 km	MPC · JPL
73198	2002 JQ_{12}	—	May 6, 2002	Desert Eagle	W. K. Y. Yeung	V	1.9 km	MPC · JPL
73199 Orlece	2002 JY_{12}	Orlece	May 8, 2002	Desert Eagle	W. K. Y. Yeung	·	3.0 km	MPC · JPL
73200	2002 JP_{13}	—	May 6, 2002	Kitt Peak	Spacewatch	·	5.4 km	MPC · JPL

== 73201–73300 ==
back to top

Designation			Discovery			Properties		Ref
Permanent	Provisional	Named after	Date	Site	Discoverer(s)	Category	Diam.	Ref
73201	2002 JU_{13}	—	May 7, 2002	Socorro	LINEAR	EUP	8.0 km	MPC · JPL
73202	2002 JY_{14}	—	May 8, 2002	Socorro	LINEAR	·	3.4 km	MPC · JPL
73203	2002 JR_{15}	—	May 8, 2002	Socorro	LINEAR	·	2.4 km	MPC · JPL
73204	2002 JZ_{15}	—	May 8, 2002	Desert Eagle	W. K. Y. Yeung	NYS	2.1 km	MPC · JPL
73205	2002 JY_{16}	—	May 7, 2002	Palomar	NEAT	·	4.2 km	MPC · JPL
73206	2002 JK_{18}	—	May 7, 2002	Palomar	NEAT	·	3.0 km	MPC · JPL
73207	2002 JJ_{19}	—	May 7, 2002	Palomar	NEAT	·	1.7 km	MPC · JPL
73208	2002 JK_{19}	—	May 7, 2002	Palomar	NEAT	·	1.6 km	MPC · JPL
73209	2002 JM_{19}	—	May 7, 2002	Palomar	NEAT	(2076)	2.1 km	MPC · JPL
73210	2002 JA_{20}	—	May 8, 2002	Palomar	NEAT	·	2.3 km	MPC · JPL
73211	2002 JK_{21}	—	May 8, 2002	Haleakala	NEAT	·	3.5 km	MPC · JPL
73212	2002 JB_{22}	—	May 7, 2002	Socorro	LINEAR	·	1.6 km	MPC · JPL
73213	2002 JN_{22}	—	May 8, 2002	Socorro	LINEAR	V	1.8 km	MPC · JPL
73214	2002 JQ_{22}	—	May 8, 2002	Socorro	LINEAR	MAS	1.4 km	MPC · JPL
73215	2002 JS_{22}	—	May 8, 2002	Socorro	LINEAR	·	2.3 km	MPC · JPL
73216	2002 JW_{22}	—	May 8, 2002	Socorro	LINEAR	(21344)	4.0 km	MPC · JPL
73217	2002 JX_{23}	—	May 8, 2002	Socorro	LINEAR	·	1.8 km	MPC · JPL
73218	2002 JA_{24}	—	May 8, 2002	Socorro	LINEAR	·	2.9 km	MPC · JPL
73219	2002 JB_{24}	—	May 8, 2002	Socorro	LINEAR	·	2.2 km	MPC · JPL
73220	2002 JO_{24}	—	May 8, 2002	Socorro	LINEAR	·	4.6 km	MPC · JPL
73221	2002 JP_{24}	—	May 8, 2002	Socorro	LINEAR	·	1.7 km	MPC · JPL
73222	2002 JB_{25}	—	May 8, 2002	Socorro	LINEAR	·	3.7 km	MPC · JPL
73223	2002 JD_{25}	—	May 8, 2002	Socorro	LINEAR	·	3.2 km	MPC · JPL
73224	2002 JK_{25}	—	May 8, 2002	Socorro	LINEAR	·	4.3 km	MPC · JPL
73225	2002 JN_{25}	—	May 8, 2002	Socorro	LINEAR	·	4.8 km	MPC · JPL
73226	2002 JW_{25}	—	May 8, 2002	Socorro	LINEAR	·	2.5 km	MPC · JPL
73227	2002 JO_{26}	—	May 8, 2002	Socorro	LINEAR	·	2.2 km	MPC · JPL
73228	2002 JA_{27}	—	May 8, 2002	Socorro	LINEAR	·	1.9 km	MPC · JPL
73229	2002 JP_{28}	—	May 9, 2002	Socorro	LINEAR	·	2.5 km	MPC · JPL
73230	2002 JS_{28}	—	May 9, 2002	Socorro	LINEAR	fast	2.1 km	MPC · JPL
73231	2002 JY_{28}	—	May 9, 2002	Socorro	LINEAR	·	2.6 km	MPC · JPL
73232	2002 JC_{29}	—	May 9, 2002	Socorro	LINEAR	·	1.7 km	MPC · JPL
73233	2002 JN_{30}	—	May 9, 2002	Socorro	LINEAR	·	4.5 km	MPC · JPL
73234	2002 JX_{32}	—	May 9, 2002	Socorro	LINEAR	·	5.5 km	MPC · JPL
73235	2002 JM_{33}	—	May 9, 2002	Socorro	LINEAR	·	1.2 km	MPC · JPL
73236	2002 JR_{33}	—	May 9, 2002	Socorro	LINEAR	·	2.2 km	MPC · JPL
73237	2002 JA_{34}	—	May 9, 2002	Socorro	LINEAR	·	2.2 km	MPC · JPL
73238	2002 JL_{34}	—	May 9, 2002	Socorro	LINEAR	·	2.1 km	MPC · JPL
73239	2002 JU_{34}	—	May 9, 2002	Socorro	LINEAR	·	2.0 km	MPC · JPL
73240	2002 JB_{36}	—	May 9, 2002	Socorro	LINEAR	V	1.2 km	MPC · JPL
73241	2002 JC_{36}	—	May 9, 2002	Socorro	LINEAR	(5)	2.7 km	MPC · JPL
73242	2002 JJ_{36}	—	May 9, 2002	Socorro	LINEAR	·	2.4 km	MPC · JPL
73243	2002 JK_{36}	—	May 9, 2002	Socorro	LINEAR	MRX	3.5 km	MPC · JPL
73244	2002 JS_{38}	—	May 9, 2002	Palomar	NEAT	AGN	2.5 km	MPC · JPL
73245	2002 JU_{39}	—	May 10, 2002	Desert Eagle	W. K. Y. Yeung	·	2.1 km	MPC · JPL
73246	2002 JO_{40}	—	May 8, 2002	Socorro	LINEAR	·	5.6 km	MPC · JPL
73247	2002 JY_{40}	—	May 8, 2002	Socorro	LINEAR	V	1.2 km	MPC · JPL
73248	2002 JC_{41}	—	May 8, 2002	Socorro	LINEAR	V	1.5 km	MPC · JPL
73249	2002 JG_{41}	—	May 8, 2002	Socorro	LINEAR	NYS	2.5 km	MPC · JPL
73250	2002 JL_{42}	—	May 8, 2002	Socorro	LINEAR	·	1.7 km	MPC · JPL
73251	2002 JM_{42}	—	May 8, 2002	Socorro	LINEAR	·	2.7 km	MPC · JPL
73252	2002 JQ_{42}	—	May 8, 2002	Socorro	LINEAR	·	2.1 km	MPC · JPL
73253	2002 JF_{43}	—	May 9, 2002	Socorro	LINEAR	·	4.5 km	MPC · JPL
73254	2002 JK_{43}	—	May 9, 2002	Socorro	LINEAR	·	2.7 km	MPC · JPL
73255	2002 JL_{43}	—	May 9, 2002	Socorro	LINEAR	·	1.9 km	MPC · JPL
73256	2002 JN_{43}	—	May 9, 2002	Socorro	LINEAR	·	2.2 km	MPC · JPL
73257	2002 JM_{44}	—	May 9, 2002	Socorro	LINEAR	·	1.7 km	MPC · JPL
73258	2002 JV_{44}	—	May 9, 2002	Socorro	LINEAR	·	1.9 km	MPC · JPL
73259	2002 JY_{45}	—	May 9, 2002	Socorro	LINEAR	EUN	2.9 km	MPC · JPL
73260	2002 JP_{46}	—	May 9, 2002	Socorro	LINEAR	·	2.5 km	MPC · JPL
73261	2002 JX_{46}	—	May 9, 2002	Socorro	LINEAR	·	1.3 km	MPC · JPL
73262	2002 JK_{47}	—	May 9, 2002	Socorro	LINEAR	·	3.5 km	MPC · JPL
73263	2002 JP_{47}	—	May 9, 2002	Socorro	LINEAR	·	2.8 km	MPC · JPL
73264	2002 JU_{47}	—	May 9, 2002	Socorro	LINEAR	GEF	2.6 km	MPC · JPL
73265	2002 JW_{48}	—	May 9, 2002	Socorro	LINEAR	·	1.6 km	MPC · JPL
73266	2002 JN_{49}	—	May 9, 2002	Socorro	LINEAR	·	1.5 km	MPC · JPL
73267	2002 JD_{50}	—	May 9, 2002	Socorro	LINEAR	·	1.3 km	MPC · JPL
73268	2002 JN_{50}	—	May 9, 2002	Socorro	LINEAR	·	2.0 km	MPC · JPL
73269	2002 JS_{50}	—	May 9, 2002	Socorro	LINEAR	LEO	4.9 km	MPC · JPL
73270	2002 JY_{50}	—	May 9, 2002	Socorro	LINEAR	·	3.2 km	MPC · JPL
73271	2002 JH_{51}	—	May 9, 2002	Socorro	LINEAR	·	1.9 km	MPC · JPL
73272	2002 JW_{51}	—	May 9, 2002	Socorro	LINEAR	·	2.9 km	MPC · JPL
73273	2002 JZ_{51}	—	May 9, 2002	Socorro	LINEAR	·	2.6 km	MPC · JPL
73274	2002 JU_{52}	—	May 9, 2002	Socorro	LINEAR	·	2.7 km	MPC · JPL
73275	2002 JT_{53}	—	May 9, 2002	Socorro	LINEAR	·	2.5 km	MPC · JPL
73276	2002 JU_{53}	—	May 9, 2002	Socorro	LINEAR	fast	1.5 km	MPC · JPL
73277	2002 JP_{58}	—	May 9, 2002	Socorro	LINEAR	·	7.2 km	MPC · JPL
73278	2002 JU_{58}	—	May 9, 2002	Socorro	LINEAR	EOS	4.8 km	MPC · JPL
73279	2002 JZ_{58}	—	May 9, 2002	Socorro	LINEAR	·	2.0 km	MPC · JPL
73280	2002 JK_{59}	—	May 9, 2002	Socorro	LINEAR	KOR	3.3 km	MPC · JPL
73281	2002 JZ_{59}	—	May 9, 2002	Socorro	LINEAR	HYG	6.5 km	MPC · JPL
73282	2002 JH_{61}	—	May 8, 2002	Socorro	LINEAR	·	2.6 km	MPC · JPL
73283	2002 JW_{62}	—	May 8, 2002	Socorro	LINEAR	ADE	4.8 km	MPC · JPL
73284	2002 JW_{63}	—	May 9, 2002	Socorro	LINEAR	·	1.9 km	MPC · JPL
73285	2002 JB_{64}	—	May 9, 2002	Socorro	LINEAR	·	2.1 km	MPC · JPL
73286	2002 JF_{64}	—	May 9, 2002	Socorro	LINEAR	·	7.0 km	MPC · JPL
73287	2002 JO_{64}	—	May 9, 2002	Socorro	LINEAR	·	2.2 km	MPC · JPL
73288	2002 JP_{64}	—	May 9, 2002	Socorro	LINEAR	MAS	1.5 km	MPC · JPL
73289	2002 JW_{64}	—	May 9, 2002	Socorro	LINEAR	·	9.1 km	MPC · JPL
73290	2002 JB_{65}	—	May 9, 2002	Socorro	LINEAR	·	4.5 km	MPC · JPL
73291	2002 JG_{65}	—	May 9, 2002	Socorro	LINEAR	·	2.2 km	MPC · JPL
73292	2002 JU_{65}	—	May 9, 2002	Socorro	LINEAR	ADE	6.0 km	MPC · JPL
73293	2002 JH_{66}	—	May 9, 2002	Socorro	LINEAR	·	2.1 km	MPC · JPL
73294	2002 JU_{66}	—	May 10, 2002	Socorro	LINEAR	·	3.5 km	MPC · JPL
73295	2002 JM_{67}	—	May 8, 2002	Bergisch Gladbach	W. Bickel	·	11 km	MPC · JPL
73296	2002 JY_{67}	—	May 12, 2002	Reedy Creek	J. Broughton	TIR	5.5 km	MPC · JPL
73297	2002 JP_{68}	—	May 6, 2002	Socorro	LINEAR	·	4.1 km	MPC · JPL
73298	2002 JX_{68}	—	May 7, 2002	Socorro	LINEAR	V	1.4 km	MPC · JPL
73299	2002 JO_{69}	—	May 7, 2002	Socorro	LINEAR	V	1.8 km	MPC · JPL
73300	2002 JY_{69}	—	May 7, 2002	Socorro	LINEAR	·	1.8 km	MPC · JPL

== 73301–73400 ==
back to top

Designation			Discovery			Properties		Ref
Permanent	Provisional	Named after	Date	Site	Discoverer(s)	Category	Diam.	Ref
73301	2002 JB_{70}	—	May 7, 2002	Socorro	LINEAR	·	5.8 km	MPC · JPL
73302	2002 JM_{70}	—	May 7, 2002	Socorro	LINEAR	·	5.8 km	MPC · JPL
73303	2002 JN_{72}	—	May 8, 2002	Socorro	LINEAR	·	3.9 km	MPC · JPL
73304	2002 JW_{72}	—	May 8, 2002	Socorro	LINEAR	V	1.3 km	MPC · JPL
73305	2002 JF_{73}	—	May 8, 2002	Socorro	LINEAR	·	2.5 km	MPC · JPL
73306	2002 JD_{74}	—	May 8, 2002	Socorro	LINEAR	·	7.2 km	MPC · JPL
73307	2002 JE_{74}	—	May 8, 2002	Socorro	LINEAR	EUN	2.9 km	MPC · JPL
73308	2002 JJ_{74}	—	May 8, 2002	Socorro	LINEAR	EUN · fast	2.3 km	MPC · JPL
73309	2002 JC_{75}	—	May 9, 2002	Socorro	LINEAR	V	1.4 km	MPC · JPL
73310	2002 JE_{76}	—	May 11, 2002	Socorro	LINEAR	·	1.9 km	MPC · JPL
73311	2002 JX_{77}	—	May 11, 2002	Socorro	LINEAR	·	1.4 km	MPC · JPL
73312	2002 JN_{78}	—	May 11, 2002	Socorro	LINEAR	NYS ·	3.3 km	MPC · JPL
73313	2002 JR_{78}	—	May 11, 2002	Socorro	LINEAR	·	2.3 km	MPC · JPL
73314	2002 JA_{79}	—	May 11, 2002	Socorro	LINEAR	·	2.2 km	MPC · JPL
73315	2002 JP_{79}	—	May 11, 2002	Socorro	LINEAR	·	3.3 km	MPC · JPL
73316	2002 JP_{83}	—	May 11, 2002	Socorro	LINEAR	fast	1.4 km	MPC · JPL
73317	2002 JQ_{83}	—	May 11, 2002	Socorro	LINEAR	·	1.8 km	MPC · JPL
73318	2002 JR_{87}	—	May 11, 2002	Socorro	LINEAR	·	4.3 km	MPC · JPL
73319	2002 JK_{89}	—	May 11, 2002	Socorro	LINEAR	·	2.3 km	MPC · JPL
73320	2002 JE_{92}	—	May 11, 2002	Socorro	LINEAR	·	2.7 km	MPC · JPL
73321	2002 JX_{97}	—	May 8, 2002	Socorro	LINEAR	·	5.0 km	MPC · JPL
73322	2002 JZ_{97}	—	May 8, 2002	Socorro	LINEAR	·	5.1 km	MPC · JPL
73323	2002 JO_{98}	—	May 13, 2002	Socorro	LINEAR	·	1.7 km	MPC · JPL
73324	2002 JX_{99}	—	May 8, 2002	Socorro	LINEAR	·	2.2 km	MPC · JPL
73325	2002 JL_{101}	—	May 9, 2002	Socorro	LINEAR	·	2.5 km	MPC · JPL
73326	2002 JH_{102}	—	May 9, 2002	Socorro	LINEAR	·	2.5 km	MPC · JPL
73327	2002 JE_{104}	—	May 10, 2002	Socorro	LINEAR	·	2.0 km	MPC · JPL
73328	2002 JK_{105}	—	May 12, 2002	Socorro	LINEAR	THM	6.9 km	MPC · JPL
73329	2002 JN_{105}	—	May 12, 2002	Socorro	LINEAR	·	1.5 km	MPC · JPL
73330	2002 JS_{105}	—	May 12, 2002	Socorro	LINEAR	THM	5.5 km	MPC · JPL
73331	2002 JK_{106}	—	May 15, 2002	Socorro	LINEAR	·	5.3 km	MPC · JPL
73332	2002 JV_{107}	—	May 10, 2002	Palomar	NEAT	·	2.1 km	MPC · JPL
73333	2002 JT_{109}	—	May 11, 2002	Socorro	LINEAR	·	2.7 km	MPC · JPL
73334	2002 JD_{110}	—	May 11, 2002	Socorro	LINEAR	·	3.3 km	MPC · JPL
73335	2002 JN_{110}	—	May 11, 2002	Socorro	LINEAR	·	3.1 km	MPC · JPL
73336	2002 JA_{111}	—	May 11, 2002	Socorro	LINEAR	THB	6.3 km	MPC · JPL
73337	2002 JP_{111}	—	May 11, 2002	Socorro	LINEAR	·	1.8 km	MPC · JPL
73338	2002 JS_{111}	—	May 11, 2002	Socorro	LINEAR	·	1.8 km	MPC · JPL
73339	2002 JS_{112}	—	May 13, 2002	Socorro	LINEAR	·	1.6 km	MPC · JPL
73340	2002 JV_{114}	—	May 13, 2002	Socorro	LINEAR	MAR	2.3 km	MPC · JPL
73341	2002 JX_{114}	—	May 13, 2002	Socorro	LINEAR	·	5.0 km	MPC · JPL
73342 Guyunusa	2002 JX_{115}	Guyunusa	May 4, 2002	Los Molinos	Los Molinos	·	3.9 km	MPC · JPL
73343	2002 JQ_{117}	—	May 4, 2002	Anderson Mesa	LONEOS	EUN	3.3 km	MPC · JPL
73344	2002 JT_{119}	—	May 5, 2002	Palomar	NEAT	·	2.5 km	MPC · JPL
73345	2002 JM_{121}	—	May 5, 2002	Palomar	NEAT	·	3.3 km	MPC · JPL
73346	2002 JV_{122}	—	May 6, 2002	Palomar	NEAT	DOR	4.6 km	MPC · JPL
73347	2002 JS_{123}	—	May 6, 2002	Kitt Peak	Spacewatch	V	1.6 km	MPC · JPL
73348	2002 JZ_{129}	—	May 8, 2002	Socorro	LINEAR	·	4.6 km	MPC · JPL
73349	2002 JE_{131}	—	May 8, 2002	Haleakala	NEAT	·	1.9 km	MPC · JPL
73350	2002 JT_{131}	—	May 9, 2002	Palomar	NEAT	·	1.5 km	MPC · JPL
73351	2002 JO_{133}	—	May 9, 2002	Socorro	LINEAR	·	2.3 km	MPC · JPL
73352	2002 JM_{134}	—	May 9, 2002	Palomar	NEAT	·	2.5 km	MPC · JPL
73353	2002 JW_{135}	—	May 9, 2002	Palomar	NEAT	KOR	2.6 km	MPC · JPL
73354	2002 JW_{142}	—	May 11, 2002	Socorro	LINEAR	·	3.7 km	MPC · JPL
73355	2002 JE_{144}	—	May 13, 2002	Palomar	NEAT	MAR	2.1 km	MPC · JPL
73356	2002 JP_{146}	—	May 15, 2002	Haleakala	NEAT	·	2.5 km	MPC · JPL
73357	2002 KB	—	May 16, 2002	Fountain Hills	Hills, Fountain	H	2.3 km	MPC · JPL
73358 Kitwhitten	2002 KT_{1}	Kitwhitten	May 17, 2002	Palomar	NEAT	·	5.7 km	MPC · JPL
73359	2002 KN_{2}	—	May 17, 2002	Palomar	NEAT	V	1.3 km	MPC · JPL
73360	2002 KW_{2}	—	May 18, 2002	Palomar	NEAT	·	1.1 km	MPC · JPL
73361	2002 KD_{5}	—	May 16, 2002	Socorro	LINEAR	·	5.5 km	MPC · JPL
73362	2002 KP_{5}	—	May 16, 2002	Socorro	LINEAR	·	4.2 km	MPC · JPL
73363	2002 KG_{6}	—	May 27, 2002	Haleakala	NEAT	(7605)	17 km	MPC · JPL
73364	2002 KX_{6}	—	May 27, 2002	Palomar	NEAT	TIR	7.3 km	MPC · JPL
73365	2002 KN_{8}	—	May 29, 2002	Haleakala	NEAT	TIR	11 km	MPC · JPL
73366	2002 KO_{8}	—	May 29, 2002	Haleakala	NEAT	·	5.4 km	MPC · JPL
73367	2002 KV_{8}	—	May 29, 2002	Haleakala	NEAT	EOS	4.8 km	MPC · JPL
73368	2002 KB_{11}	—	May 16, 2002	Haleakala	NEAT	·	3.5 km	MPC · JPL
73369	2002 KE_{11}	—	May 17, 2002	Palomar	NEAT	·	4.6 km	MPC · JPL
73370	2002 KJ_{12}	—	May 17, 2002	Kitt Peak	Spacewatch	·	4.8 km	MPC · JPL
73371	2002 KA_{13}	—	May 18, 2002	Palomar	NEAT	KOR	2.6 km	MPC · JPL
73372	2002 KB_{13}	—	May 18, 2002	Socorro	LINEAR	V	1.4 km	MPC · JPL
73373	2002 KU_{13}	—	May 19, 2002	Palomar	NEAT	·	5.2 km	MPC · JPL
73374	2002 KC_{14}	—	May 30, 2002	Palomar	NEAT	·	3.3 km	MPC · JPL
73375	2002 LN_{2}	—	June 4, 2002	Anderson Mesa	LONEOS	·	5.7 km	MPC · JPL
73376	2002 LO_{2}	—	June 4, 2002	Anderson Mesa	LONEOS	RAF	2.3 km	MPC · JPL
73377	2002 LQ_{4}	—	June 5, 2002	Socorro	LINEAR	·	1.5 km	MPC · JPL
73378	2002 LJ_{6}	—	June 7, 2002	Haleakala	NEAT	EUN	2.8 km	MPC · JPL
73379	2002 LJ_{7}	—	June 2, 2002	Palomar	NEAT	·	2.9 km	MPC · JPL
73380	2002 LR_{7}	—	June 2, 2002	Anderson Mesa	LONEOS	·	1.7 km	MPC · JPL
73381	2002 LY_{7}	—	June 4, 2002	Socorro	LINEAR	·	1.7 km	MPC · JPL
73382	2002 LE_{8}	—	June 5, 2002	Socorro	LINEAR	AGN	2.6 km	MPC · JPL
73383	2002 LM_{8}	—	June 5, 2002	Socorro	LINEAR	·	1.9 km	MPC · JPL
73384	2002 LK_{9}	—	June 5, 2002	Socorro	LINEAR	(2076)	2.4 km	MPC · JPL
73385	2002 LP_{9}	—	June 5, 2002	Socorro	LINEAR	·	2.2 km	MPC · JPL
73386	2002 LU_{9}	—	June 5, 2002	Socorro	LINEAR	·	5.1 km	MPC · JPL
73387	2002 LV_{11}	—	June 5, 2002	Socorro	LINEAR	·	4.6 km	MPC · JPL
73388	2002 LN_{12}	—	June 5, 2002	Socorro	LINEAR	·	2.0 km	MPC · JPL
73389	2002 LY_{12}	—	June 5, 2002	Socorro	LINEAR	·	6.3 km	MPC · JPL
73390	2002 LE_{14}	—	June 6, 2002	Socorro	LINEAR	·	6.0 km	MPC · JPL
73391	2002 LJ_{14}	—	June 6, 2002	Socorro	LINEAR	·	2.6 km	MPC · JPL
73392	2002 LN_{14}	—	June 6, 2002	Socorro	LINEAR	NEM	4.7 km	MPC · JPL
73393	2002 LU_{15}	—	June 6, 2002	Socorro	LINEAR	·	4.1 km	MPC · JPL
73394	2002 LB_{16}	—	June 6, 2002	Socorro	LINEAR	(18466)	3.0 km	MPC · JPL
73395	2002 LP_{16}	—	June 6, 2002	Socorro	LINEAR	·	5.4 km	MPC · JPL
73396	2002 LV_{18}	—	June 6, 2002	Socorro	LINEAR	·	5.6 km	MPC · JPL
73397	2002 LC_{19}	—	June 6, 2002	Socorro	LINEAR	·	13 km	MPC · JPL
73398	2002 LN_{19}	—	June 6, 2002	Socorro	LINEAR	·	2.6 km	MPC · JPL
73399	2002 LT_{20}	—	June 6, 2002	Socorro	LINEAR	(194)	5.3 km	MPC · JPL
73400	2002 LF_{21}	—	June 6, 2002	Socorro	LINEAR	EOS	4.8 km	MPC · JPL

== 73401–73500 ==
back to top

Designation			Discovery			Properties		Ref
Permanent	Provisional	Named after	Date	Site	Discoverer(s)	Category	Diam.	Ref
73401	2002 LE_{22}	—	June 8, 2002	Socorro	LINEAR	KOR	3.2 km	MPC · JPL
73402	2002 LA_{23}	—	June 8, 2002	Socorro	LINEAR	·	6.6 km	MPC · JPL
73403	2002 LG_{23}	—	June 8, 2002	Socorro	LINEAR	·	6.1 km	MPC · JPL
73404	2002 LL_{24}	—	June 9, 2002	Reedy Creek	J. Broughton	·	2.0 km	MPC · JPL
73405	2002 LE_{25}	—	June 2, 2002	Anderson Mesa	LONEOS	·	2.4 km	MPC · JPL
73406	2002 LT_{25}	—	June 5, 2002	Socorro	LINEAR	·	4.2 km	MPC · JPL
73407	2002 LV_{25}	—	June 5, 2002	Socorro	LINEAR	TIR	6.9 km	MPC · JPL
73408	2002 LH_{26}	—	June 6, 2002	Socorro	LINEAR	·	2.0 km	MPC · JPL
73409	2002 LS_{26}	—	June 6, 2002	Socorro	LINEAR	EOS	4.8 km	MPC · JPL
73410	2002 LV_{26}	—	June 7, 2002	Socorro	LINEAR	·	5.5 km	MPC · JPL
73411	2002 LW_{26}	—	June 7, 2002	Socorro	LINEAR	·	7.9 km	MPC · JPL
73412	2002 LC_{28}	—	June 9, 2002	Socorro	LINEAR	EOS	4.4 km	MPC · JPL
73413	2002 LE_{28}	—	June 9, 2002	Socorro	LINEAR	HYG	6.7 km	MPC · JPL
73414	2002 LU_{30}	—	June 3, 2002	Palomar	NEAT	·	2.7 km	MPC · JPL
73415	2002 LZ_{32}	—	June 3, 2002	Socorro	LINEAR	·	3.1 km	MPC · JPL
73416	2002 LP_{34}	—	June 8, 2002	Socorro	LINEAR	·	4.7 km	MPC · JPL
73417	2002 LX_{35}	—	June 9, 2002	Socorro	LINEAR	·	4.8 km	MPC · JPL
73418	2002 LK_{36}	—	June 9, 2002	Socorro	LINEAR	T_{j} (2.96) · 3:2	12 km	MPC · JPL
73419	2002 LQ_{36}	—	June 9, 2002	Socorro	LINEAR	·	5.0 km	MPC · JPL
73420	2002 LX_{36}	—	June 9, 2002	Socorro	LINEAR	·	3.0 km	MPC · JPL
73421	2002 LX_{38}	—	June 7, 2002	Socorro	LINEAR	·	3.1 km	MPC · JPL
73422	2002 LY_{38}	—	June 7, 2002	Socorro	LINEAR	·	9.7 km	MPC · JPL
73423	2002 LG_{39}	—	June 10, 2002	Socorro	LINEAR	·	1.7 km	MPC · JPL
73424	2002 LV_{39}	—	June 10, 2002	Socorro	LINEAR	·	5.8 km	MPC · JPL
73425	2002 LJ_{41}	—	June 10, 2002	Socorro	LINEAR	·	2.1 km	MPC · JPL
73426	2002 LM_{41}	—	June 10, 2002	Socorro	LINEAR	EOS	3.7 km	MPC · JPL
73427	2002 LH_{42}	—	June 10, 2002	Socorro	LINEAR	·	1.8 km	MPC · JPL
73428	2002 LP_{45}	—	June 6, 2002	Socorro	LINEAR	·	4.4 km	MPC · JPL
73429	2002 LY_{47}	—	June 13, 2002	Socorro	LINEAR	·	15 km	MPC · JPL
73430	2002 LX_{48}	—	June 12, 2002	Palomar	NEAT	EOS	5.2 km	MPC · JPL
73431	2002 LU_{55}	—	June 14, 2002	Socorro	LINEAR	·	4.9 km	MPC · JPL
73432	2002 LD_{57}	—	June 10, 2002	Socorro	LINEAR	·	8.2 km	MPC · JPL
73433	2002 LJ_{57}	—	June 11, 2002	Palomar	NEAT	PAD	3.8 km	MPC · JPL
73434	2002 LB_{58}	—	June 14, 2002	Socorro	LINEAR	·	4.8 km	MPC · JPL
73435	2002 MS	—	June 18, 2002	Reedy Creek	J. Broughton	·	6.0 km	MPC · JPL
73436	2002 MH_{2}	—	June 16, 2002	Palomar	NEAT	HIL · 3:2	11 km	MPC · JPL
73437	2002 MJ_{2}	—	June 16, 2002	Palomar	NEAT	EOS	6.2 km	MPC · JPL
73438	2002 MM_{2}	—	June 17, 2002	Socorro	LINEAR	·	2.4 km	MPC · JPL
73439	2002 MQ_{2}	—	June 17, 2002	Haleakala	NEAT	·	2.6 km	MPC · JPL
73440	2002 ML_{3}	—	June 29, 2002	Palomar	NEAT	·	4.8 km	MPC · JPL
73441	2002 MU_{3}	—	June 30, 2002	Palomar	NEAT	·	5.1 km	MPC · JPL
73442 Feruglio	2002 NE_{5}	Feruglio	July 10, 2002	Campo Imperatore	CINEOS	·	7.4 km	MPC · JPL
73443	2002 NK_{10}	—	July 4, 2002	Palomar	NEAT	·	8.3 km	MPC · JPL
73444	2002 NR_{12}	—	July 4, 2002	Palomar	NEAT	·	10 km	MPC · JPL
73445	2002 NS_{12}	—	July 4, 2002	Palomar	NEAT	·	5.2 km	MPC · JPL
73446	2002 NX_{12}	—	July 4, 2002	Palomar	NEAT	·	5.5 km	MPC · JPL
73447	2002 NM_{13}	—	July 4, 2002	Palomar	NEAT	EOS	4.4 km	MPC · JPL
73448	2002 NS_{13}	—	July 4, 2002	Palomar	NEAT	EOS	5.2 km	MPC · JPL
73449	2002 NW_{18}	—	July 9, 2002	Socorro	LINEAR	EOS	8.6 km	MPC · JPL
73450	2002 NY_{19}	—	July 9, 2002	Socorro	LINEAR	·	12 km	MPC · JPL
73451	2002 NN_{30}	—	July 6, 2002	Anderson Mesa	LONEOS	EOS	5.0 km	MPC · JPL
73452	2002 NS_{33}	—	July 13, 2002	Palomar	NEAT	EOS	6.0 km	MPC · JPL
73453 Ninomanfredi	2002 NJ_{34}	Ninomanfredi	July 13, 2002	Campo Catino	G. Masi, F. Mallia	HOF	5.4 km	MPC · JPL
73454	2002 NB_{35}	—	July 9, 2002	Socorro	LINEAR	EOS	5.8 km	MPC · JPL
73455	2002 NT_{36}	—	July 9, 2002	Socorro	LINEAR	T_{j} (2.99) · HIL · 3:2	8.8 km	MPC · JPL
73456	2002 ND_{38}	—	July 9, 2002	Socorro	LINEAR	EOS	6.0 km	MPC · JPL
73457	2002 NZ_{43}	—	July 12, 2002	Palomar	NEAT	T_{j} (2.97) · HIL · 3:2 · (6124)	12 km	MPC · JPL
73458	2002 NZ_{47}	—	July 4, 2002	Palomar	NEAT	HIL · 3:2 · (3561)	11 km	MPC · JPL
73459	2002 NL_{48}	—	July 13, 2002	Socorro	LINEAR	·	7.1 km	MPC · JPL
73460	2002 NM_{50}	—	July 14, 2002	Palomar	NEAT	·	5.4 km	MPC · JPL
73461	2002 NV_{51}	—	July 14, 2002	Socorro	LINEAR	EOS	4.2 km	MPC · JPL
73462	2002 NA_{53}	—	July 14, 2002	Palomar	NEAT	KOR	3.3 km	MPC · JPL
73463	2002 NE_{53}	—	July 14, 2002	Palomar	NEAT	EOS	3.7 km	MPC · JPL
73464	2002 NY_{54}	—	July 5, 2002	Palomar	NEAT	·	3.8 km	MPC · JPL
73465 Buonanno	2002 NP_{55}	Buonanno	July 10, 2002	Campo Imperatore	CINEOS	·	3.6 km	MPC · JPL
73466	2002 OP_{5}	—	July 20, 2002	Palomar	NEAT	·	3.8 km	MPC · JPL
73467	2002 OV_{5}	—	July 20, 2002	Palomar	NEAT	URS	8.4 km	MPC · JPL
73468	2002 OB_{8}	—	July 18, 2002	Palomar	NEAT	·	6.8 km	MPC · JPL
73469	2002 OZ_{12}	—	July 18, 2002	Socorro	LINEAR	EOS	4.2 km	MPC · JPL
73470	2002 OM_{15}	—	July 18, 2002	Socorro	LINEAR	·	6.7 km	MPC · JPL
73471	2002 OH_{16}	—	July 18, 2002	Socorro	LINEAR	BRA	3.5 km	MPC · JPL
73472	2002 ON_{18}	—	July 18, 2002	Socorro	LINEAR	·	7.3 km	MPC · JPL
73473	2002 OV_{18}	—	July 18, 2002	Socorro	LINEAR	·	5.4 km	MPC · JPL
73474	2002 OK_{19}	—	July 18, 2002	Socorro	LINEAR	·	4.2 km	MPC · JPL
73475	2002 PV_{1}	—	August 5, 2002	El Centro	Centro, El	3:2	10 km	MPC · JPL
73476	2002 PO_{4}	—	August 4, 2002	Palomar	NEAT	·	1.4 km	MPC · JPL
73477	2002 PQ_{14}	—	August 6, 2002	Palomar	NEAT	·	4.1 km	MPC · JPL
73478	2002 PX_{14}	—	August 6, 2002	Palomar	NEAT	·	5.0 km	MPC · JPL
73479	2002 PM_{23}	—	August 6, 2002	Palomar	NEAT	·	6.0 km	MPC · JPL
73480	2002 PN_{34}	—	August 6, 2002	Palomar	NEAT	centaur	112 km	MPC · JPL
73481	2002 PO_{69}	—	August 11, 2002	Socorro	LINEAR	·	9.8 km	MPC · JPL
73482	2002 PP_{71}	—	August 12, 2002	Socorro	LINEAR	·	6.1 km	MPC · JPL
73483	2002 PB_{72}	—	August 12, 2002	Socorro	LINEAR	·	9.1 km	MPC · JPL
73484	2002 PD_{72}	—	August 12, 2002	Socorro	LINEAR	·	3.9 km	MPC · JPL
73485	2002 PA_{73}	—	August 12, 2002	Socorro	LINEAR	·	8.1 km	MPC · JPL
73486	2002 PY_{85}	—	August 13, 2002	Socorro	LINEAR	·	8.9 km	MPC · JPL
73487	2002 PD_{89}	—	August 11, 2002	Socorro	LINEAR	·	4.9 km	MPC · JPL
73488	2002 PO_{90}	—	August 11, 2002	Socorro	LINEAR	·	7.5 km	MPC · JPL
73489	2002 PE_{121}	—	August 13, 2002	Anderson Mesa	LONEOS	·	4.6 km	MPC · JPL
73490	2002 PR_{123}	—	August 12, 2002	Anderson Mesa	LONEOS	·	5.5 km	MPC · JPL
73491 Robmatson	2002 PO_{164}	Robmatson	August 8, 2002	Palomar	S. F. Hönig	·	4.5 km	MPC · JPL
73492	2002 QE_{28}	—	August 28, 2002	Palomar	NEAT	THM	6.0 km	MPC · JPL
73493	2002 QT_{41}	—	August 29, 2002	Palomar	NEAT	·	4.5 km	MPC · JPL
73494	2002 QF_{42}	—	August 30, 2002	Palomar	NEAT	·	9.6 km	MPC · JPL
73495	2002 QE_{43}	—	August 30, 2002	Palomar	NEAT	·	7.2 km	MPC · JPL
73496	2002 RW_{10}	—	September 4, 2002	Palomar	NEAT	HYG	6.2 km	MPC · JPL
73497	2002 RT_{13}	—	September 4, 2002	Anderson Mesa	LONEOS	THM	7.4 km	MPC · JPL
73498	2002 RP_{25}	—	September 4, 2002	Anderson Mesa	LONEOS	·	5.8 km	MPC · JPL
73499	2002 RL_{53}	—	September 5, 2002	Socorro	LINEAR	·	4.1 km	MPC · JPL
73500	2002 RK_{57}	—	September 5, 2002	Anderson Mesa	LONEOS	HYG	6.9 km	MPC · JPL

== 73501–73600 ==
back to top

Designation			Discovery			Properties		Ref
Permanent	Provisional	Named after	Date	Site	Discoverer(s)	Category	Diam.	Ref
73501	2002 RG_{157}	—	September 11, 2002	Palomar	NEAT	·	2.4 km	MPC · JPL
73502	2002 RE_{224}	—	September 13, 2002	Anderson Mesa	LONEOS	·	9.5 km	MPC · JPL
73503	2002 TX_{52}	—	October 2, 2002	Socorro	LINEAR	·	3.2 km	MPC · JPL
73504	2002 TO_{110}	—	October 2, 2002	Haleakala	NEAT	EUN	4.0 km	MPC · JPL
73505	2002 TD_{124}	—	October 4, 2002	Palomar	NEAT	·	9.1 km	MPC · JPL
73506	2002 TJ_{144}	—	October 5, 2002	Socorro	LINEAR	·	13 km	MPC · JPL
73507	2002 TN_{220}	—	October 6, 2002	Socorro	LINEAR	·	7.1 km	MPC · JPL
73508	2002 TQ_{220}	—	October 6, 2002	Socorro	LINEAR	·	10 km	MPC · JPL
73509	2002 TG_{260}	—	October 9, 2002	Socorro	LINEAR	·	5.4 km	MPC · JPL
73510	2002 UQ	—	October 22, 2002	Palomar	NEAT	·	9.4 km	MPC · JPL
73511 Lovas	2002 YD_{3}	Lovas	December 25, 2002	Piszkéstető	K. Sárneczky	·	8.8 km	MPC · JPL
73512	2003 AL_{11}	—	January 1, 2003	Socorro	LINEAR	·	2.5 km	MPC · JPL
73513	2003 BK_{10}	—	January 26, 2003	Anderson Mesa	LONEOS	·	1.5 km	MPC · JPL
73514	2003 BB_{48}	—	January 27, 2003	Socorro	LINEAR	·	4.8 km	MPC · JPL
73515	2003 EU_{5}	—	March 5, 2003	Socorro	LINEAR	NYS	2.5 km	MPC · JPL
73516	2003 EY_{45}	—	March 7, 2003	Socorro	LINEAR	·	4.1 km	MPC · JPL
73517 Cranbrook	2003 FG_{78}	Cranbrook	March 27, 2003	Catalina	CSS	EOS	4.9 km	MPC · JPL
73518	2003 HW_{46}	—	April 28, 2003	Socorro	LINEAR	·	2.1 km	MPC · JPL
73519	2003 JF_{10}	—	May 1, 2003	Socorro	LINEAR	EOS	3.5 km	MPC · JPL
73520 Boslough	2003 MB_{1}	Boslough	June 22, 2003	Anderson Mesa	LONEOS	·	6.0 km	MPC · JPL
73521	2003 MD_{1}	—	June 22, 2003	Anderson Mesa	LONEOS	·	2.3 km	MPC · JPL
73522	2003 MK_{2}	—	June 22, 2003	Anderson Mesa	LONEOS	DOR	8.0 km	MPC · JPL
73523	2003 MQ_{3}	—	June 25, 2003	Socorro	LINEAR	·	3.9 km	MPC · JPL
73524	2003 MO_{6}	—	June 26, 2003	Socorro	LINEAR	·	9.7 km	MPC · JPL
73525	2003 MP_{8}	—	June 28, 2003	Socorro	LINEAR	V	1.4 km	MPC · JPL
73526	2003 NU	—	July 1, 2003	Haleakala	NEAT	·	2.4 km	MPC · JPL
73527	2003 NC_{3}	—	July 2, 2003	Socorro	LINEAR	·	11 km	MPC · JPL
73528	2003 NU_{8}	—	July 5, 2003	Socorro	LINEAR	·	12 km	MPC · JPL
73529 Giorgiopalumbo	2003 OF_{1}	Giorgiopalumbo	July 22, 2003	Campo Imperatore	CINEOS	EOS	4.1 km	MPC · JPL
73530	2003 OL_{2}	—	July 22, 2003	Haleakala	NEAT	·	3.9 km	MPC · JPL
73531	2003 OE_{5}	—	July 22, 2003	Haleakala	NEAT	MAS	1.4 km	MPC · JPL
73532	2003 OF_{5}	—	July 22, 2003	Haleakala	NEAT	EOS	5.7 km	MPC · JPL
73533 Alonso	2003 OC_{6}	Alonso	July 25, 2003	Majorca	OAM	V	1.6 km	MPC · JPL
73534 Liviasavioli	2003 OD_{7}	Liviasavioli	July 24, 2003	Campo Imperatore	CINEOS	·	1.2 km	MPC · JPL
73535	2003 OB_{14}	—	July 28, 2003	Palomar	NEAT	CYB	13 km	MPC · JPL
73536	2003 OX_{14}	—	July 22, 2003	Palomar	NEAT	·	8.0 km	MPC · JPL
73537	2003 OC_{15}	—	July 22, 2003	Palomar	NEAT	·	4.0 km	MPC · JPL
73538	2003 OD_{15}	—	July 22, 2003	Palomar	NEAT	·	5.0 km	MPC · JPL
73539 Carmenperrella	2003 OW_{18}	Carmenperrella	July 30, 2003	Campo Imperatore	CINEOS	·	8.9 km	MPC · JPL
73540	2003 OZ_{20}	—	July 23, 2003	Socorro	LINEAR	·	2.5 km	MPC · JPL
73541	2003 OE_{22}	—	July 29, 2003	Socorro	LINEAR	·	2.7 km	MPC · JPL
73542	2003 OJ_{23}	—	July 29, 2003	Bergisch Gladbach	W. Bickel	·	2.7 km	MPC · JPL
73543	2003 OB_{30}	—	July 24, 2003	Palomar	NEAT	EOS	3.9 km	MPC · JPL
73544	2003 OZ_{30}	—	July 30, 2003	Socorro	LINEAR	·	9.1 km	MPC · JPL
73545	2003 OB_{31}	—	July 30, 2003	Socorro	LINEAR	·	5.7 km	MPC · JPL
73546	2003 OM_{31}	—	July 30, 2003	Socorro	LINEAR	·	2.0 km	MPC · JPL
73547	2003 PW	—	August 1, 2003	Socorro	LINEAR	·	4.0 km	MPC · JPL
73548	2003 PM_{3}	—	August 2, 2003	Haleakala	NEAT	·	2.9 km	MPC · JPL
73549	2003 PL_{8}	—	August 3, 2003	Haleakala	NEAT	·	2.4 km	MPC · JPL
73550	2003 PG_{9}	—	August 4, 2003	Socorro	LINEAR	·	3.5 km	MPC · JPL
73551 Dariocastellano	2003 QV	Dariocastellano	August 18, 2003	Campo Imperatore	CINEOS	EOS	3.9 km	MPC · JPL
73552	2003 QK_{12}	—	August 22, 2003	Haleakala	NEAT	·	2.2 km	MPC · JPL
73553	2003 QH_{30}	—	August 22, 2003	Reedy Creek	J. Broughton	DOR	5.6 km	MPC · JPL
73554	2124 P-L	—	September 24, 1960	Palomar	C. J. van Houten, I. van Houten-Groeneveld, T. Gehrels	EOS	5.9 km	MPC · JPL
73555	2129 P-L	—	September 24, 1960	Palomar	C. J. van Houten, I. van Houten-Groeneveld, T. Gehrels	·	3.9 km	MPC · JPL
73556	2130 P-L	—	September 24, 1960	Palomar	C. J. van Houten, I. van Houten-Groeneveld, T. Gehrels	·	8.5 km	MPC · JPL
73557	2131 P-L	—	September 24, 1960	Palomar	C. J. van Houten, I. van Houten-Groeneveld, T. Gehrels	·	1.8 km	MPC · JPL
73558	2567 P-L	—	September 24, 1960	Palomar	C. J. van Houten, I. van Houten-Groeneveld, T. Gehrels	KOR	3.2 km	MPC · JPL
73559	2665 P-L	—	September 24, 1960	Palomar	C. J. van Houten, I. van Houten-Groeneveld, T. Gehrels	·	2.0 km	MPC · JPL
73560	2737 P-L	—	September 24, 1960	Palomar	C. J. van Houten, I. van Houten-Groeneveld, T. Gehrels	·	2.7 km	MPC · JPL
73561	2803 P-L	—	September 24, 1960	Palomar	C. J. van Houten, I. van Houten-Groeneveld, T. Gehrels	·	1.9 km	MPC · JPL
73562	2810 P-L	—	September 24, 1960	Palomar	C. J. van Houten, I. van Houten-Groeneveld, T. Gehrels	·	1.6 km	MPC · JPL
73563	3009 P-L	—	September 24, 1960	Palomar	C. J. van Houten, I. van Houten-Groeneveld, T. Gehrels	EOS	3.8 km	MPC · JPL
73564	4051 P-L	—	September 24, 1960	Palomar	C. J. van Houten, I. van Houten-Groeneveld, T. Gehrels	·	4.4 km	MPC · JPL
73565	4252 P-L	—	September 24, 1960	Palomar	C. J. van Houten, I. van Houten-Groeneveld, T. Gehrels	·	1.9 km	MPC · JPL
73566	4259 P-L	—	September 24, 1960	Palomar	C. J. van Houten, I. van Houten-Groeneveld, T. Gehrels	·	5.7 km	MPC · JPL
73567	4509 P-L	—	September 24, 1960	Palomar	C. J. van Houten, I. van Houten-Groeneveld, T. Gehrels	·	5.8 km	MPC · JPL
73568	4656 P-L	—	September 24, 1960	Palomar	C. J. van Houten, I. van Houten-Groeneveld, T. Gehrels	·	1.8 km	MPC · JPL
73569	4659 P-L	—	September 24, 1960	Palomar	C. J. van Houten, I. van Houten-Groeneveld, T. Gehrels	EMA	6.6 km	MPC · JPL
73570	4736 P-L	—	September 24, 1960	Palomar	C. J. van Houten, I. van Houten-Groeneveld, T. Gehrels	·	5.6 km	MPC · JPL
73571	4755 P-L	—	September 24, 1960	Palomar	C. J. van Houten, I. van Houten-Groeneveld, T. Gehrels	·	2.9 km	MPC · JPL
73572	4765 P-L	—	September 24, 1960	Palomar	C. J. van Houten, I. van Houten-Groeneveld, T. Gehrels	·	3.6 km	MPC · JPL
73573	4766 P-L	—	September 24, 1960	Palomar	C. J. van Houten, I. van Houten-Groeneveld, T. Gehrels	·	7.5 km	MPC · JPL
73574	4783 P-L	—	September 24, 1960	Palomar	C. J. van Houten, I. van Houten-Groeneveld, T. Gehrels	·	5.5 km	MPC · JPL
73575	4789 P-L	—	September 24, 1960	Palomar	C. J. van Houten, I. van Houten-Groeneveld, T. Gehrels	·	970 m	MPC · JPL
73576	4812 P-L	—	September 24, 1960	Palomar	C. J. van Houten, I. van Houten-Groeneveld, T. Gehrels	·	5.2 km	MPC · JPL
73577	4818 P-L	—	September 24, 1960	Palomar	C. J. van Houten, I. van Houten-Groeneveld, T. Gehrels	·	8.8 km	MPC · JPL
73578	6277 P-L	—	September 24, 1960	Palomar	C. J. van Houten, I. van Houten-Groeneveld, T. Gehrels	·	5.4 km	MPC · JPL
73579	6284 P-L	—	September 24, 1960	Palomar	C. J. van Houten, I. van Houten-Groeneveld, T. Gehrels	·	2.6 km	MPC · JPL
73580	6285 P-L	—	September 24, 1960	Palomar	C. J. van Houten, I. van Houten-Groeneveld, T. Gehrels	·	1.4 km	MPC · JPL
73581	6772 P-L	—	September 24, 1960	Palomar	C. J. van Houten, I. van Houten-Groeneveld, T. Gehrels	·	4.6 km	MPC · JPL
73582	2249 T-1	—	March 25, 1971	Palomar	C. J. van Houten, I. van Houten-Groeneveld, T. Gehrels	·	2.8 km	MPC · JPL
73583	3092 T-1	—	March 26, 1971	Palomar	C. J. van Houten, I. van Houten-Groeneveld, T. Gehrels	·	4.9 km	MPC · JPL
73584	3228 T-1	—	March 26, 1971	Palomar	C. J. van Houten, I. van Houten-Groeneveld, T. Gehrels	NYS	2.7 km	MPC · JPL
73585	3339 T-1	—	March 26, 1971	Palomar	C. J. van Houten, I. van Houten-Groeneveld, T. Gehrels	·	4.6 km	MPC · JPL
73586	4141 T-1	—	March 26, 1971	Palomar	C. J. van Houten, I. van Houten-Groeneveld, T. Gehrels	·	2.1 km	MPC · JPL
73587	1020 T-2	—	September 29, 1973	Palomar	C. J. van Houten, I. van Houten-Groeneveld, T. Gehrels	V	1.3 km	MPC · JPL
73588	1067 T-2	—	September 29, 1973	Palomar	C. J. van Houten, I. van Houten-Groeneveld, T. Gehrels	NYS	3.1 km	MPC · JPL
73589	1114 T-2	—	September 29, 1973	Palomar	C. J. van Houten, I. van Houten-Groeneveld, T. Gehrels	MAS	1.3 km	MPC · JPL
73590	1258 T-2	—	September 29, 1973	Palomar	C. J. van Houten, I. van Houten-Groeneveld, T. Gehrels	·	3.6 km	MPC · JPL
73591	1359 T-2	—	September 30, 1973	Palomar	C. J. van Houten, I. van Houten-Groeneveld, T. Gehrels	·	1.7 km	MPC · JPL
73592	1401 T-2	—	September 29, 1973	Palomar	C. J. van Houten, I. van Houten-Groeneveld, T. Gehrels	NYS	1.5 km	MPC · JPL
73593	1806 T-2	—	September 24, 1973	Palomar	C. J. van Houten, I. van Houten-Groeneveld, T. Gehrels	NYS	2.3 km	MPC · JPL
73594	2014 T-2	—	September 29, 1973	Palomar	C. J. van Houten, I. van Houten-Groeneveld, T. Gehrels	·	1.9 km	MPC · JPL
73595	2129 T-2	—	September 29, 1973	Palomar	C. J. van Houten, I. van Houten-Groeneveld, T. Gehrels	·	2.8 km	MPC · JPL
73596	2147 T-2	—	September 29, 1973	Palomar	C. J. van Houten, I. van Houten-Groeneveld, T. Gehrels	NAE	6.6 km	MPC · JPL
73597	2188 T-2	—	September 29, 1973	Palomar	C. J. van Houten, I. van Houten-Groeneveld, T. Gehrels	·	2.3 km	MPC · JPL
73598	2912 T-2	—	September 30, 1973	Palomar	C. J. van Houten, I. van Houten-Groeneveld, T. Gehrels	·	1.1 km	MPC · JPL
73599	3012 T-2	—	September 30, 1973	Palomar	C. J. van Houten, I. van Houten-Groeneveld, T. Gehrels	·	1.5 km	MPC · JPL
73600	3020 T-2	—	September 30, 1973	Palomar	C. J. van Houten, I. van Houten-Groeneveld, T. Gehrels	·	5.0 km	MPC · JPL

== 73601–73700 ==
back to top

Designation			Discovery			Properties		Ref
Permanent	Provisional	Named after	Date	Site	Discoverer(s)	Category	Diam.	Ref
73601	3045 T-2	—	September 30, 1973	Palomar	C. J. van Houten, I. van Houten-Groeneveld, T. Gehrels	·	4.3 km	MPC · JPL
73602	3053 T-2	—	September 30, 1973	Palomar	C. J. van Houten, I. van Houten-Groeneveld, T. Gehrels	·	3.5 km	MPC · JPL
73603	3214 T-2	—	September 30, 1973	Palomar	C. J. van Houten, I. van Houten-Groeneveld, T. Gehrels	·	4.1 km	MPC · JPL
73604	4039 T-2	—	September 29, 1973	Palomar	C. J. van Houten, I. van Houten-Groeneveld, T. Gehrels	NYS	3.1 km	MPC · JPL
73605	4041 T-2	—	September 29, 1973	Palomar	C. J. van Houten, I. van Houten-Groeneveld, T. Gehrels	·	5.2 km	MPC · JPL
73606	4079 T-2	—	September 29, 1973	Palomar	C. J. van Houten, I. van Houten-Groeneveld, T. Gehrels	(5)	3.1 km	MPC · JPL
73607	4092 T-2	—	September 29, 1973	Palomar	C. J. van Houten, I. van Houten-Groeneveld, T. Gehrels	·	5.1 km	MPC · JPL
73608	4155 T-2	—	September 29, 1973	Palomar	C. J. van Houten, I. van Houten-Groeneveld, T. Gehrels	·	2.5 km	MPC · JPL
73609	5114 T-2	—	September 25, 1973	Palomar	C. J. van Houten, I. van Houten-Groeneveld, T. Gehrels	·	3.2 km	MPC · JPL
73610 Klyuchevskaya	1054 T-3	Klyuchevskaya	October 17, 1977	Palomar	C. J. van Houten, I. van Houten-Groeneveld, T. Gehrels	H ·	1.0 km	MPC · JPL
73611	2127 T-3	—	October 16, 1977	Palomar	C. J. van Houten, I. van Houten-Groeneveld, T. Gehrels	·	7.0 km	MPC · JPL
73612	2178 T-3	—	October 16, 1977	Palomar	C. J. van Houten, I. van Houten-Groeneveld, T. Gehrels	·	4.2 km	MPC · JPL
73613	2213 T-3	—	October 16, 1977	Palomar	C. J. van Houten, I. van Houten-Groeneveld, T. Gehrels	·	2.8 km	MPC · JPL
73614	2229 T-3	—	October 16, 1977	Palomar	C. J. van Houten, I. van Houten-Groeneveld, T. Gehrels	·	6.2 km	MPC · JPL
73615	2353 T-3	—	October 16, 1977	Palomar	C. J. van Houten, I. van Houten-Groeneveld, T. Gehrels	·	2.8 km	MPC · JPL
73616	2383 T-3	—	October 16, 1977	Palomar	C. J. van Houten, I. van Houten-Groeneveld, T. Gehrels	·	3.4 km	MPC · JPL
73617	2437 T-3	—	October 16, 1977	Palomar	C. J. van Houten, I. van Houten-Groeneveld, T. Gehrels	·	4.4 km	MPC · JPL
73618	2458 T-3	—	October 16, 1977	Palomar	C. J. van Houten, I. van Houten-Groeneveld, T. Gehrels	·	3.7 km	MPC · JPL
73619	3322 T-3	—	October 16, 1977	Palomar	C. J. van Houten, I. van Houten-Groeneveld, T. Gehrels	ADE	6.8 km	MPC · JPL
73620	3346 T-3	—	October 16, 1977	Palomar	C. J. van Houten, I. van Houten-Groeneveld, T. Gehrels	·	2.2 km	MPC · JPL
73621	3381 T-3	—	October 16, 1977	Palomar	C. J. van Houten, I. van Houten-Groeneveld, T. Gehrels	·	3.4 km	MPC · JPL
73622	3418 T-3	—	October 16, 1977	Palomar	C. J. van Houten, I. van Houten-Groeneveld, T. Gehrels	·	6.6 km	MPC · JPL
73623	3477 T-3	—	October 16, 1977	Palomar	C. J. van Houten, I. van Houten-Groeneveld, T. Gehrels	·	4.1 km	MPC · JPL
73624	3481 T-3	—	October 16, 1977	Palomar	C. J. van Houten, I. van Houten-Groeneveld, T. Gehrels	·	2.7 km	MPC · JPL
73625	3524 T-3	—	October 16, 1977	Palomar	C. J. van Houten, I. van Houten-Groeneveld, T. Gehrels	·	2.3 km	MPC · JPL
73626	3939 T-3	—	October 16, 1977	Palomar	C. J. van Houten, I. van Houten-Groeneveld, T. Gehrels	·	2.2 km	MPC · JPL
73627	4040 T-3	—	October 16, 1977	Palomar	C. J. van Houten, I. van Houten-Groeneveld, T. Gehrels	·	2.6 km	MPC · JPL
73628	4170 T-3	—	October 16, 1977	Palomar	C. J. van Houten, I. van Houten-Groeneveld, T. Gehrels	·	4.7 km	MPC · JPL
73629	4303 T-3	—	October 16, 1977	Palomar	C. J. van Houten, I. van Houten-Groeneveld, T. Gehrels	EMA · fast	7.4 km	MPC · JPL
73630	4352 T-3	—	October 16, 1977	Palomar	C. J. van Houten, I. van Houten-Groeneveld, T. Gehrels	·	5.8 km	MPC · JPL
73631	4367 T-3	—	October 16, 1977	Palomar	C. J. van Houten, I. van Houten-Groeneveld, T. Gehrels	·	4.2 km	MPC · JPL
73632	4432 T-3	—	October 11, 1977	Palomar	C. J. van Houten, I. van Houten-Groeneveld, T. Gehrels	·	4.3 km	MPC · JPL
73633	4702 T-3	—	October 16, 1977	Palomar	C. J. van Houten, I. van Houten-Groeneveld, T. Gehrels	·	6.8 km	MPC · JPL
73634	5077 T-3	—	October 16, 1977	Palomar	C. J. van Houten, I. van Houten-Groeneveld, T. Gehrels	·	6.4 km	MPC · JPL
73635	5105 T-3	—	October 16, 1977	Palomar	C. J. van Houten, I. van Houten-Groeneveld, T. Gehrels	TEL	3.0 km	MPC · JPL
73636	5727 T-3	—	October 16, 1977	Palomar	C. J. van Houten, I. van Houten-Groeneveld, T. Gehrels	EUN	3.2 km	MPC · JPL
73637 Guneus	1973 SX_{1}	Guneus	September 19, 1973	Palomar	C. J. van Houten, I. van Houten-Groeneveld, T. Gehrels	L4	20 km	MPC · JPL
73638 Likhanov	1975 VC_{9}	Likhanov	November 8, 1975	Nauchnyj	N. S. Chernykh	·	9.9 km	MPC · JPL
73639	1977 EL_{7}	—	March 12, 1977	Kiso	H. Kosai, K. Furukawa	·	5.5 km	MPC · JPL
73640 Biermann	1977 RM	Biermann	September 5, 1977	La Silla	H.-E. Schuster	·	6.1 km	MPC · JPL
73641	1977 UK_{3}	—	October 18, 1977	Palomar	S. J. Bus	L5	15 km	MPC · JPL
73642	1978 RV_{9}	—	September 2, 1978	La Silla	C.-I. Lagerkvist	·	1.8 km	MPC · JPL
73643	1978 UA_{5}	—	October 27, 1978	Palomar	C. M. Olmstead	NYS	1.8 km	MPC · JPL
73644	1978 UD_{7}	—	October 27, 1978	Palomar	C. M. Olmstead	·	3.4 km	MPC · JPL
73645	1978 VX_{2}	—	November 7, 1978	Palomar	E. F. Helin, S. J. Bus	·	3.6 km	MPC · JPL
73646	1978 VT_{3}	—	November 7, 1978	Palomar	E. F. Helin, S. J. Bus	·	4.1 km	MPC · JPL
73647	1978 VL_{9}	—	November 7, 1978	Palomar	E. F. Helin, S. J. Bus	·	2.6 km	MPC · JPL
73648	1979 ME_{6}	—	June 25, 1979	Siding Spring	E. F. Helin, S. J. Bus	·	1.3 km	MPC · JPL
73649	1979 MA_{9}	—	June 25, 1979	Siding Spring	E. F. Helin, S. J. Bus	·	6.1 km	MPC · JPL
73650	1981 DN	—	February 28, 1981	Siding Spring	S. J. Bus	·	2.8 km	MPC · JPL
73651	1981 EJ_{2}	—	March 2, 1981	Siding Spring	S. J. Bus	·	4.4 km	MPC · JPL
73652	1981 EN_{3}	—	March 2, 1981	Siding Spring	S. J. Bus	PHO	1.8 km	MPC · JPL
73653	1981 EN_{6}	—	March 6, 1981	Siding Spring	S. J. Bus	·	1.8 km	MPC · JPL
73654	1981 ET_{6}	—	March 6, 1981	Siding Spring	S. J. Bus	3:2	14 km	MPC · JPL
73655	1981 EL_{9}	—	March 1, 1981	Siding Spring	S. J. Bus	CYB	10 km	MPC · JPL
73656	1981 EW_{12}	—	March 1, 1981	Siding Spring	S. J. Bus	·	1.9 km	MPC · JPL
73657	1981 EJ_{13}	—	March 1, 1981	Siding Spring	S. J. Bus	·	2.8 km	MPC · JPL
73658	1981 EU_{14}	—	March 1, 1981	Siding Spring	S. J. Bus	·	3.5 km	MPC · JPL
73659	1981 ER_{16}	—	March 6, 1981	Siding Spring	S. J. Bus	·	2.6 km	MPC · JPL
73660	1981 EZ_{19}	—	March 2, 1981	Siding Spring	S. J. Bus	·	4.5 km	MPC · JPL
73661	1981 EW_{25}	—	March 2, 1981	Siding Spring	S. J. Bus	PHO	1.9 km	MPC · JPL
73662	1981 ES_{27}	—	March 2, 1981	Siding Spring	S. J. Bus	·	1.3 km	MPC · JPL
73663	1981 EL_{31}	—	March 2, 1981	Siding Spring	S. J. Bus	BAP	2.2 km	MPC · JPL
73664	1981 EE_{34}	—	March 1, 1981	Siding Spring	S. J. Bus	·	1.7 km	MPC · JPL
73665	1981 EX_{42}	—	March 2, 1981	Siding Spring	S. J. Bus	·	2.8 km	MPC · JPL
73666	1981 EH_{45}	—	March 1, 1981	Siding Spring	S. J. Bus	·	2.9 km	MPC · JPL
73667	1981 ER_{45}	—	March 1, 1981	Siding Spring	S. J. Bus	·	1.5 km	MPC · JPL
73668	1981 EG_{48}	—	March 6, 1981	Siding Spring	S. J. Bus	·	3.1 km	MPC · JPL
73669	1981 WL_{2}	—	November 25, 1981	Palomar	C. T. Kowal	H	1.5 km	MPC · JPL
73670 Kurthopf	1982 QP	Kurthopf	August 19, 1982	Palomar	C. S. Shoemaker, E. M. Shoemaker	·	7.2 km	MPC · JPL
73671	1984 BH_{6}	—	January 26, 1984	Palomar	E. Bowell	·	2.5 km	MPC · JPL
73672	1986 QR	—	August 26, 1986	La Silla	H. Debehogne	·	2.6 km	MPC · JPL
73673	1986 RX_{1}	—	September 6, 1986	Palomar	E. F. Helin	·	3.9 km	MPC · JPL
73674	1988 BN_{5}	—	January 28, 1988	Siding Spring	R. H. McNaught	THB	6.4 km	MPC · JPL
73675	1988 CF	—	February 8, 1988	Kushiro	S. Ueda, H. Kaneda	(5)	3.6 km	MPC · JPL
73676	1988 CD_{5}	—	February 13, 1988	La Silla	E. W. Elst	EOS	6.1 km	MPC · JPL
73677	1988 SA_{3}	—	September 16, 1988	Cerro Tololo	S. J. Bus	L5	25 km	MPC · JPL
73678	1988 TY	—	October 13, 1988	Kushiro	S. Ueda, H. Kaneda	·	2.6 km	MPC · JPL
73679	1989 SQ_{2}	—	September 26, 1989	La Silla	E. W. Elst	·	1.4 km	MPC · JPL
73680	1989 SP_{10}	—	September 28, 1989	La Silla	H. Debehogne	·	1.8 km	MPC · JPL
73681	1989 TL_{18}	—	October 2, 1989	Palomar	E. F. Helin, K. J. Lawrence	·	1.8 km	MPC · JPL
73682	1990 HU_{5}	—	April 29, 1990	Siding Spring	A. Żytkow, M. J. Irwin	·	7.7 km	MPC · JPL
73683	1990 RV_{3}	—	September 14, 1990	Palomar	H. E. Holt	·	2.8 km	MPC · JPL
73684	1990 SV	—	September 16, 1990	Palomar	H. E. Holt	·	2.5 km	MPC · JPL
73685	1990 SE_{9}	—	September 22, 1990	La Silla	E. W. Elst	(5)	3.5 km	MPC · JPL
73686 Nussdorf	1990 TV_{1}	Nussdorf	October 10, 1990	Tautenburg Observatory	L. D. Schmadel, F. Börngen	(5)	2.2 km	MPC · JPL
73687 Thomas Aquinas	1990 TQ_{2}	Thomas Aquinas	October 10, 1990	Tautenburg Observatory	F. Börngen, L. D. Schmadel	MAR	4.3 km	MPC · JPL
73688	1990 VA_{5}	—	November 15, 1990	La Silla	E. W. Elst	·	2.5 km	MPC · JPL
73689	1991 FK	—	March 17, 1991	Kiyosato	S. Otomo, O. Muramatsu	H	1.9 km	MPC · JPL
73690	1991 PU_{2}	—	August 2, 1991	La Silla	E. W. Elst	TIR ·	11 km	MPC · JPL
73691	1991 PB_{3}	—	August 2, 1991	La Silla	E. W. Elst	·	11 km	MPC · JPL
73692 Gürtler	1991 RL_{3}	Gürtler	September 12, 1991	Tautenburg Observatory	L. D. Schmadel, F. Börngen	·	2.9 km	MPC · JPL
73693 Dorschner	1991 RQ_{3}	Dorschner	September 12, 1991	Tautenburg Observatory	F. Börngen, L. D. Schmadel	·	5.6 km	MPC · JPL
73694	1991 RL_{15}	—	September 15, 1991	Palomar	H. E. Holt	·	13 km	MPC · JPL
73695	1991 RL_{17}	—	September 11, 1991	Palomar	H. E. Holt	NYS	2.9 km	MPC · JPL
73696	1991 RQ_{19}	—	September 14, 1991	Palomar	H. E. Holt	·	3.4 km	MPC · JPL
73697	1991 RT_{29}	—	September 12, 1991	Palomar	H. E. Holt	·	3.8 km	MPC · JPL
73698	1991 TE	—	October 1, 1991	Siding Spring	R. H. McNaught	THB	10 km	MPC · JPL
73699 Landaupfalz	1991 TH_{3}	Landaupfalz	October 4, 1991	Tautenburg Observatory	L. D. Schmadel, F. Börngen	·	2.9 km	MPC · JPL
73700 von Kues	1991 TW_{4}	von Kues	October 5, 1991	Tautenburg Observatory	F. Börngen, L. D. Schmadel	·	7.1 km	MPC · JPL

== 73701–73800 ==
back to top

Designation			Discovery			Properties		Ref
Permanent	Provisional	Named after	Date	Site	Discoverer(s)	Category	Diam.	Ref
73701 Siegfriedbauer	1991 TU_{5}	Siegfriedbauer	October 3, 1991	Tautenburg Observatory	L. D. Schmadel, F. Börngen	·	3.1 km	MPC · JPL
73702	1991 TQ_{10}	—	October 10, 1991	Kitt Peak	Spacewatch	·	3.2 km	MPC · JPL
73703 Billings	1991 TL_{15}	Billings	October 6, 1991	Palomar	Lowe, A.	EOS	4.1 km	MPC · JPL
73704 Hladiuk	1991 TW_{15}	Hladiuk	October 6, 1991	Palomar	Lowe, A.	·	4.5 km	MPC · JPL
73705	1991 UR_{2}	—	October 31, 1991	Kitami	A. Takahashi, K. Watanabe	·	2.1 km	MPC · JPL
73706	1991 VC_{9}	—	November 4, 1991	Kitt Peak	Spacewatch	NYS	2.9 km	MPC · JPL
73707	1991 VS_{10}	—	November 5, 1991	Kitt Peak	Spacewatch	THM	7.7 km	MPC · JPL
73708	1992 DV	—	February 25, 1992	Kushiro	S. Ueda, H. Kaneda	·	2.2 km	MPC · JPL
73709	1992 DV_{7}	—	February 29, 1992	La Silla	UESAC	·	2.1 km	MPC · JPL
73710	1992 EL_{21}	—	March 4, 1992	La Silla	UESAC	NYS	2.1 km	MPC · JPL
73711	1992 EW_{24}	—	March 4, 1992	La Silla	UESAC	·	3.7 km	MPC · JPL
73712	1992 RB_{4}	—	September 2, 1992	La Silla	E. W. Elst	NYS ·	3.6 km	MPC · JPL
73713	1992 RW_{6}	—	September 2, 1992	La Silla	E. W. Elst	KOR	4.6 km	MPC · JPL
73714	1992 SW_{14}	—	September 30, 1992	Palomar	H. E. Holt	PHO	3.2 km	MPC · JPL
73715	1992 SC_{21}	—	September 22, 1992	La Silla	E. W. Elst	·	5.3 km	MPC · JPL
73716	1992 YT_{3}	—	December 24, 1992	Kitt Peak	Spacewatch	·	3.3 km	MPC · JPL
73717	1993 BV_{4}	—	January 27, 1993	Caussols	E. W. Elst	·	2.6 km	MPC · JPL
73718	1993 BL_{5}	—	January 27, 1993	Caussols	E. W. Elst	THM	7.4 km	MPC · JPL
73719 Rotaryterni	1993 FT	Rotaryterni	March 22, 1993	Stroncone	A. Vagnozzi	·	2.2 km	MPC · JPL
73720	1993 FR_{9}	—	March 17, 1993	La Silla	UESAC	·	3.3 km	MPC · JPL
73721	1993 FZ_{14}	—	March 17, 1993	La Silla	UESAC	HYG	5.7 km	MPC · JPL
73722	1993 FK_{18}	—	March 17, 1993	La Silla	UESAC	·	1.9 km	MPC · JPL
73723	1993 FJ_{20}	—	March 19, 1993	La Silla	UESAC	NYS	2.4 km	MPC · JPL
73724	1993 FA_{25}	—	March 21, 1993	La Silla	UESAC	KON	4.9 km	MPC · JPL
73725	1993 FC_{27}	—	March 21, 1993	La Silla	UESAC	·	2.4 km	MPC · JPL
73726	1993 FD_{29}	—	March 21, 1993	La Silla	UESAC	·	4.2 km	MPC · JPL
73727	1993 FT_{39}	—	March 19, 1993	La Silla	UESAC	·	3.4 km	MPC · JPL
73728	1993 FP_{40}	—	March 19, 1993	La Silla	UESAC	NYS	2.7 km	MPC · JPL
73729	1993 FH_{41}	—	March 19, 1993	La Silla	UESAC	NYS	3.2 km	MPC · JPL
73730	1993 FL_{46}	—	March 19, 1993	La Silla	UESAC	·	4.2 km	MPC · JPL
73731	1993 FS_{47}	—	March 19, 1993	La Silla	UESAC	V	2.0 km	MPC · JPL
73732	1993 FH_{60}	—	March 19, 1993	La Silla	UESAC	MAS	1.6 km	MPC · JPL
73733	1993 FD_{83}	—	March 19, 1993	La Silla	UESAC	·	5.8 km	MPC · JPL
73734	1993 OT_{12}	—	July 19, 1993	La Silla	E. W. Elst	·	7.5 km	MPC · JPL
73735	1993 QE_{3}	—	August 18, 1993	Caussols	E. W. Elst	·	1.9 km	MPC · JPL
73736	1993 QT_{6}	—	August 20, 1993	La Silla	E. W. Elst	·	3.8 km	MPC · JPL
73737	1993 RH_{4}	—	September 15, 1993	La Silla	E. W. Elst	·	5.4 km	MPC · JPL
73738	1993 RK_{6}	—	September 15, 1993	La Silla	E. W. Elst	·	4.3 km	MPC · JPL
73739	1993 SV_{5}	—	September 17, 1993	La Silla	E. W. Elst	·	1.5 km	MPC · JPL
73740	1993 TZ_{14}	—	October 9, 1993	La Silla	E. W. Elst	·	3.3 km	MPC · JPL
73741	1993 TY_{15}	—	October 9, 1993	La Silla	E. W. Elst	EUN	2.8 km	MPC · JPL
73742	1993 TB_{19}	—	October 9, 1993	La Silla	E. W. Elst	·	5.2 km	MPC · JPL
73743	1993 TS_{19}	—	October 9, 1993	La Silla	E. W. Elst	·	1.7 km	MPC · JPL
73744	1993 TJ_{22}	—	October 9, 1993	La Silla	E. W. Elst	·	4.4 km	MPC · JPL
73745	1993 TH_{23}	—	October 9, 1993	La Silla	E. W. Elst	fast	1.5 km	MPC · JPL
73746	1993 TY_{24}	—	October 9, 1993	La Silla	E. W. Elst	·	1.3 km	MPC · JPL
73747	1993 TX_{25}	—	October 9, 1993	La Silla	E. W. Elst	·	1.3 km	MPC · JPL
73748	1993 TF_{26}	—	October 9, 1993	La Silla	E. W. Elst	·	3.4 km	MPC · JPL
73749	1993 TG_{37}	—	October 9, 1993	La Silla	E. W. Elst	·	2.0 km	MPC · JPL
73750	1993 TT_{41}	—	October 9, 1993	La Silla	E. W. Elst	·	5.2 km	MPC · JPL
73751	1993 UK_{8}	—	October 20, 1993	La Silla	E. W. Elst	·	6.6 km	MPC · JPL
73752	1994 AD_{1}	—	January 7, 1994	Oizumi	T. Kobayashi	MAR	3.5 km	MPC · JPL
73753	1994 AQ_{5}	—	January 5, 1994	Kitt Peak	Spacewatch	·	4.8 km	MPC · JPL
73754	1994 AG_{12}	—	January 11, 1994	Kitt Peak	Spacewatch	·	1.1 km	MPC · JPL
73755	1994 CX	—	February 7, 1994	Farra d'Isonzo	Farra d'Isonzo	·	1.3 km	MPC · JPL
73756	1994 CS_{9}	—	February 7, 1994	La Silla	E. W. Elst	THM	5.9 km	MPC · JPL
73757	1994 CH_{10}	—	February 7, 1994	La Silla	E. W. Elst	HYG	8.6 km	MPC · JPL
73758	1994 CB_{11}	—	February 7, 1994	La Silla	E. W. Elst	EOS	5.0 km	MPC · JPL
73759	1994 CQ_{15}	—	February 8, 1994	La Silla	E. W. Elst	EOS	5.4 km	MPC · JPL
73760	1994 CT_{17}	—	February 8, 1994	La Silla	E. W. Elst	·	4.9 km	MPC · JPL
73761	1994 GP_{5}	—	April 6, 1994	Kitt Peak	Spacewatch	·	2.7 km	MPC · JPL
73762	1994 LS	—	June 3, 1994	Palomar	T. B. Spahr	PHO	3.7 km	MPC · JPL
73763	1994 LQ_{1}	—	June 2, 1994	Kitt Peak	Spacewatch	H	1.1 km	MPC · JPL
73764	1994 NB_{2}	—	July 4, 1994	Caussols	E. W. Elst	·	3.0 km	MPC · JPL
73765	1994 PA_{9}	—	August 10, 1994	La Silla	E. W. Elst	MAR	1.9 km	MPC · JPL
73766	1994 PH_{9}	—	August 10, 1994	La Silla	E. W. Elst	·	2.5 km	MPC · JPL
73767 Bibiandersson	1994 PQ_{9}	Bibiandersson	August 10, 1994	La Silla	E. W. Elst	H	1.3 km	MPC · JPL
73768	1994 PO_{10}	—	August 10, 1994	La Silla	E. W. Elst	(5)	2.9 km	MPC · JPL
73769 Delphi	1994 PN_{12}	Delphi	August 10, 1994	La Silla	E. W. Elst	3:2 · SHU	4.8 km	MPC · JPL
73770	1994 PG_{14}	—	August 10, 1994	La Silla	E. W. Elst	MAR	2.3 km	MPC · JPL
73771	1994 PR_{14}	—	August 10, 1994	La Silla	E. W. Elst	·	2.4 km	MPC · JPL
73772	1994 PM_{15}	—	August 10, 1994	La Silla	E. W. Elst	(5)	3.9 km	MPC · JPL
73773	1994 PZ_{18}	—	August 12, 1994	La Silla	E. W. Elst	·	6.3 km	MPC · JPL
73774	1994 PH_{19}	—	August 12, 1994	La Silla	E. W. Elst	·	4.1 km	MPC · JPL
73775	1994 PB_{24}	—	August 12, 1994	La Silla	E. W. Elst	·	2.6 km	MPC · JPL
73776	1994 PJ_{27}	—	August 12, 1994	La Silla	E. W. Elst	NYS ·	4.1 km	MPC · JPL
73777	1994 PD_{34}	—	August 10, 1994	La Silla	E. W. Elst	·	2.0 km	MPC · JPL
73778	1994 PP_{37}	—	August 10, 1994	La Silla	E. W. Elst	·	3.2 km	MPC · JPL
73779	1994 RM_{2}	—	September 2, 1994	Kitt Peak	Spacewatch	·	1.9 km	MPC · JPL
73780	1994 RR_{22}	—	September 5, 1994	La Silla	E. W. Elst	·	3.6 km	MPC · JPL
73781	1994 TW_{2}	—	October 2, 1994	Kitami	K. Endate, K. Watanabe	·	3.5 km	MPC · JPL
73782 Yanagida	1994 TD_{15}	Yanagida	October 14, 1994	Yanagida	Tsuchikawa, A., O. Muramatsu	·	6.3 km	MPC · JPL
73783	1994 UK_{6}	—	October 28, 1994	Kitt Peak	Spacewatch	·	4.0 km	MPC · JPL
73784	1994 VP_{2}	—	November 8, 1994	Oizumi	T. Kobayashi	·	4.7 km	MPC · JPL
73785	1994 WJ_{1}	—	November 27, 1994	Oizumi	T. Kobayashi	·	3.5 km	MPC · JPL
73786	1994 WX_{2}	—	November 30, 1994	Oizumi	T. Kobayashi	·	7.1 km	MPC · JPL
73787	1994 WL_{4}	—	November 26, 1994	Kitt Peak	Spacewatch	·	2.6 km	MPC · JPL
73788	1995 AB_{1}	—	January 6, 1995	Oizumi	T. Kobayashi	·	7.2 km	MPC · JPL
73789	1995 BO_{6}	—	January 28, 1995	Kitt Peak	Spacewatch	fast	5.0 km	MPC · JPL
73790	1995 BM_{12}	—	January 31, 1995	Kitt Peak	Spacewatch	AST	5.4 km	MPC · JPL
73791	1995 CO_{6}	—	February 1, 1995	Kitt Peak	Spacewatch	·	3.8 km	MPC · JPL
73792	1995 DB_{6}	—	February 24, 1995	Kitt Peak	Spacewatch	·	3.5 km	MPC · JPL
73793	1995 FK_{1}	—	March 23, 1995	Kitt Peak	Spacewatch	·	5.1 km	MPC · JPL
73794	1995 FE_{5}	—	March 23, 1995	Kitt Peak	Spacewatch	KOR	3.4 km	MPC · JPL
73795	1995 FH_{8}	—	March 26, 1995	Kitt Peak	Spacewatch	L5	20 km	MPC · JPL
73796	1995 FL_{21}	—	March 27, 1995	Kitt Peak	Spacewatch	EOS	3.9 km	MPC · JPL
73797	1995 KD_{4}	—	May 26, 1995	Kitt Peak	Spacewatch	·	3.6 km	MPC · JPL
73798	1995 MW_{2}	—	June 25, 1995	Kitt Peak	Spacewatch	EOS	4.0 km	MPC · JPL
73799	1995 MO_{6}	—	June 28, 1995	Kitt Peak	Spacewatch	EOS	4.4 km	MPC · JPL
73800	1995 ML_{7}	—	June 25, 1995	Kitt Peak	Spacewatch	·	4.0 km	MPC · JPL

== 73801–73900 ==
back to top

Designation			Discovery			Properties		Ref
Permanent	Provisional	Named after	Date	Site	Discoverer(s)	Category	Diam.	Ref
73801	1995 QA_{4}	—	August 17, 1995	Kitt Peak	Spacewatch	·	4.5 km	MPC · JPL
73802	1995 QC_{4}	—	August 17, 1995	Kitt Peak	Spacewatch	·	2.1 km	MPC · JPL
73803	1995 QT_{5}	—	August 22, 1995	Kitt Peak	Spacewatch	slow	4.7 km	MPC · JPL
73804	1995 RG	—	September 3, 1995	Siding Spring	R. H. McNaught	H	1.1 km	MPC · JPL
73805	1995 SC_{8}	—	September 17, 1995	Kitt Peak	Spacewatch	NYS ·	2.0 km	MPC · JPL
73806	1995 SL_{21}	—	September 19, 1995	Kitt Peak	Spacewatch	·	2.1 km	MPC · JPL
73807	1995 SZ_{29}	—	September 22, 1995	Kitami	K. Endate, K. Watanabe	·	2.4 km	MPC · JPL
73808	1995 SL_{32}	—	September 21, 1995	Kitt Peak	Spacewatch	MAS	1.4 km	MPC · JPL
73809	1995 SS_{48}	—	September 26, 1995	Kitt Peak	Spacewatch	·	1.2 km	MPC · JPL
73810	1995 UW_{2}	—	October 24, 1995	Kleť	Kleť	NYS	2.0 km	MPC · JPL
73811	1995 UN_{15}	—	October 17, 1995	Kitt Peak	Spacewatch	·	3.2 km	MPC · JPL
73812	1995 US_{18}	—	October 18, 1995	Kitt Peak	Spacewatch	·	2.4 km	MPC · JPL
73813	1995 UZ_{57}	—	October 17, 1995	Kitt Peak	Spacewatch	MAS	1.1 km	MPC · JPL
73814	1995 VO_{8}	—	November 14, 1995	Kitt Peak	Spacewatch	V	1.2 km	MPC · JPL
73815	1995 VY_{10}	—	November 15, 1995	Kitt Peak	Spacewatch	NYS	2.6 km	MPC · JPL
73816	1995 VJ_{11}	—	November 15, 1995	Kitt Peak	Spacewatch	NYS	2.0 km	MPC · JPL
73817	1995 VN_{16}	—	November 15, 1995	Kitt Peak	Spacewatch	·	1.6 km	MPC · JPL
73818	1995 WP_{1}	—	November 17, 1995	Church Stretton	S. P. Laurie	·	5.0 km	MPC · JPL
73819 Isaootuki	1995 WV_{6}	Isaootuki	November 16, 1995	Nanyo	T. Okuni	·	3.3 km	MPC · JPL
73820	1995 WR_{8}	—	November 29, 1995	Oizumi	T. Kobayashi	·	3.3 km	MPC · JPL
73821	1995 WY_{15}	—	November 17, 1995	Kitt Peak	Spacewatch	·	3.8 km	MPC · JPL
73822	1995 WM_{31}	—	November 19, 1995	Kitt Peak	Spacewatch	·	3.3 km	MPC · JPL
73823	1995 WQ_{40}	—	November 24, 1995	Kitt Peak	Spacewatch	·	2.1 km	MPC · JPL
73824	1995 YK_{1}	—	December 21, 1995	Oizumi	T. Kobayashi	(5)	3.2 km	MPC · JPL
73825	1995 YQ_{1}	—	December 22, 1995	Oizumi	T. Kobayashi	·	2.7 km	MPC · JPL
73826	1995 YX_{4}	—	December 16, 1995	Kitt Peak	Spacewatch	·	1.8 km	MPC · JPL
73827 Nakanohoshinokai	1996 AB_{3}	Nakanohoshinokai	January 12, 1996	Kiso	Sato, I., Abe, M.	MIS	3.8 km	MPC · JPL
73828	1996 AD_{6}	—	January 12, 1996	Kitt Peak	Spacewatch	(5)	2.5 km	MPC · JPL
73829	1996 AT_{12}	—	January 15, 1996	Kitt Peak	Spacewatch	·	4.8 km	MPC · JPL
73830	1996 AU_{13}	—	January 15, 1996	Kitt Peak	Spacewatch	·	3.2 km	MPC · JPL
73831	1996 BC_{5}	—	January 16, 1996	Kitt Peak	Spacewatch	·	4.3 km	MPC · JPL
73832	1996 BE_{12}	—	January 24, 1996	Kitt Peak	Spacewatch	·	2.4 km	MPC · JPL
73833	1996 CP_{2}	—	February 12, 1996	Oizumi	T. Kobayashi	CLO	5.1 km	MPC · JPL
73834	1996 EE_{9}	—	March 12, 1996	Kitt Peak	Spacewatch	·	3.3 km	MPC · JPL
73835	1996 EN_{15}	—	March 12, 1996	Kitt Peak	Spacewatch	·	3.3 km	MPC · JPL
73836	1996 FJ_{7}	—	March 18, 1996	Kitt Peak	Spacewatch	·	3.2 km	MPC · JPL
73837	1996 FM_{12}	—	March 17, 1996	Kitt Peak	Spacewatch	·	3.6 km	MPC · JPL
73838	1996 GR_{5}	—	April 11, 1996	Kitt Peak	Spacewatch	·	3.4 km	MPC · JPL
73839	1996 GN_{8}	—	April 13, 1996	Kitt Peak	Spacewatch	EUN	3.2 km	MPC · JPL
73840	1996 GO_{13}	—	April 11, 1996	Kitt Peak	Spacewatch	·	2.4 km	MPC · JPL
73841	1996 HY_{17}	—	April 18, 1996	La Silla	E. W. Elst	THM	5.5 km	MPC · JPL
73842	1996 HO_{22}	—	April 18, 1996	La Silla	E. W. Elst	·	4.4 km	MPC · JPL
73843	1996 JW_{9}	—	May 13, 1996	Kitt Peak	Spacewatch	KOR	2.2 km	MPC · JPL
73844	1996 PF_{4}	—	August 9, 1996	Haleakala	NEAT	·	11 km	MPC · JPL
73845	1996 RF_{3}	—	September 6, 1996	Mallorca	Blasco, M.	·	6.9 km	MPC · JPL
73846	1996 RB_{12}	—	September 8, 1996	Kitt Peak	Spacewatch	·	1.1 km	MPC · JPL
73847	1996 RA_{19}	—	September 15, 1996	Kitt Peak	Spacewatch	HYG	4.6 km	MPC · JPL
73848	1996 SC_{1}	—	September 18, 1996	Xinglong	SCAP	·	1.9 km	MPC · JPL
73849	1996 TF_{18}	—	October 4, 1996	Kitt Peak	Spacewatch	(2076)	1.4 km	MPC · JPL
73850	1996 TF_{33}	—	October 10, 1996	Kitt Peak	Spacewatch	(1298)	7.2 km	MPC · JPL
73851	1996 TK_{62}	—	October 6, 1996	La Silla	E. W. Elst	THM	6.5 km	MPC · JPL
73852	1996 VB_{4}	—	November 7, 1996	Xinglong	SCAP	·	1.8 km	MPC · JPL
73853	1996 VV_{18}	—	November 6, 1996	Kitt Peak	Spacewatch	·	1.7 km	MPC · JPL
73854	1996 VW_{23}	—	November 10, 1996	Kitt Peak	Spacewatch	·	1.5 km	MPC · JPL
73855	1996 VE_{30}	—	November 7, 1996	Kushiro	S. Ueda, H. Kaneda	·	2.3 km	MPC · JPL
73856	1996 WF	—	November 16, 1996	Sudbury	D. di Cicco	·	3.3 km	MPC · JPL
73857 Hitaneichi	1996 WA_{3}	Hitaneichi	November 16, 1996	Nanyo	T. Okuni	·	2.0 km	MPC · JPL
73858	1996 XL_{3}	—	December 1, 1996	Kitt Peak	Spacewatch	·	1.9 km	MPC · JPL
73859	1996 XK_{5}	—	December 7, 1996	Oizumi	T. Kobayashi	PHO	2.2 km	MPC · JPL
73860	1996 XR_{5}	—	December 7, 1996	Oizumi	T. Kobayashi	ERI	3.8 km	MPC · JPL
73861	1996 XN_{19}	—	December 8, 1996	Oizumi	T. Kobayashi	·	1.8 km	MPC · JPL
73862 Mochigasechugaku	1996 XN_{32}	Mochigasechugaku	December 15, 1996	Saji	Saji	V	1.3 km	MPC · JPL
73863	1996 XH_{33}	—	December 8, 1996	Xinglong	SCAP	BAP	2.8 km	MPC · JPL
73864	1996 YS_{2}	—	December 29, 1996	Oizumi	T. Kobayashi	·	1.9 km	MPC · JPL
73865	1997 AW	—	January 2, 1997	Oizumi	T. Kobayashi	·	2.7 km	MPC · JPL
73866	1997 AB_{1}	—	January 2, 1997	Oizumi	T. Kobayashi	·	2.1 km	MPC · JPL
73867	1997 AH_{1}	—	January 2, 1997	Chichibu	N. Satō	·	2.5 km	MPC · JPL
73868	1997 AD_{6}	—	January 1, 1997	Prescott	P. G. Comba	·	1.8 km	MPC · JPL
73869	1997 AM_{11}	—	January 2, 1997	Kitt Peak	Spacewatch	NYS	1.8 km	MPC · JPL
73870	1997 AC_{16}	—	January 13, 1997	Haleakala	NEAT	·	1.3 km	MPC · JPL
73871	1997 AP_{16}	—	January 14, 1997	Kleť	Kleť	·	1.5 km	MPC · JPL
73872 Stefanoragazzi	1997 AO_{17}	Stefanoragazzi	January 7, 1997	Colleverde	V. S. Casulli	·	2.1 km	MPC · JPL
73873	1997 BF_{1}	—	January 28, 1997	Oizumi	T. Kobayashi	·	2.6 km	MPC · JPL
73874	1997 BX_{1}	—	January 29, 1997	Oizumi	T. Kobayashi	·	1.7 km	MPC · JPL
73875	1997 BS_{4}	—	January 31, 1997	Kitt Peak	Spacewatch	·	2.7 km	MPC · JPL
73876	1997 CT	—	February 1, 1997	Oizumi	T. Kobayashi	·	3.2 km	MPC · JPL
73877	1997 CS_{6}	—	February 4, 1997	Haleakala	NEAT	NYS	2.2 km	MPC · JPL
73878	1997 CX_{6}	—	February 6, 1997	Haleakala	NEAT	·	1.9 km	MPC · JPL
73879	1997 CT_{7}	—	February 1, 1997	Kitt Peak	Spacewatch	·	4.6 km	MPC · JPL
73880	1997 CC_{21}	—	February 6, 1997	Kitt Peak	Spacewatch	NYS	1.7 km	MPC · JPL
73881	1997 CD_{22}	—	February 13, 1997	Oizumi	T. Kobayashi	NYS	2.8 km	MPC · JPL
73882	1997 CZ_{25}	—	February 11, 1997	Oizumi	T. Kobayashi	NYS ·	2.9 km	MPC · JPL
73883 Asteraude	1997 DQ	Asteraude	February 16, 1997	Castres	Klotz, A.	·	2.7 km	MPC · JPL
73884	1997 EG	—	March 1, 1997	Oizumi	T. Kobayashi	·	3.2 km	MPC · JPL
73885 Kalaymoodley	1997 EV	Kalaymoodley	March 1, 1997	Campo Imperatore	A. Boattini	PHO	3.3 km	MPC · JPL
73886	1997 EY_{5}	—	March 4, 1997	Kitt Peak	Spacewatch	3:2 · SHU	9.1 km	MPC · JPL
73887	1997 ED_{7}	—	March 3, 1997	Kitt Peak	Spacewatch	V	1.7 km	MPC · JPL
73888	1997 EK_{12}	—	March 3, 1997	Kitt Peak	Spacewatch	·	6.2 km	MPC · JPL
73889	1997 EN_{12}	—	March 3, 1997	Kitt Peak	Spacewatch	EUN · slow	3.3 km	MPC · JPL
73890	1997 EK_{16}	—	March 5, 1997	Kitt Peak	Spacewatch	NYS	1.8 km	MPC · JPL
73891 Pietromennea	1997 ED_{23}	Pietromennea	March 10, 1997	Colleverde	V. S. Casulli	·	2.4 km	MPC · JPL
73892	1997 ER_{25}	—	March 5, 1997	Oohira	T. Urata	·	2.5 km	MPC · JPL
73893	1997 ET_{33}	—	March 4, 1997	Socorro	LINEAR	·	2.3 km	MPC · JPL
73894	1997 EL_{34}	—	March 4, 1997	Socorro	LINEAR	NYS ·	3.4 km	MPC · JPL
73895	1997 EE_{35}	—	March 4, 1997	Socorro	LINEAR	·	2.2 km	MPC · JPL
73896	1997 EG_{35}	—	March 4, 1997	Socorro	LINEAR	·	2.1 km	MPC · JPL
73897	1997 EN_{39}	—	March 5, 1997	Socorro	LINEAR	V	1.6 km	MPC · JPL
73898	1997 ES_{42}	—	March 10, 1997	Socorro	LINEAR	·	2.3 km	MPC · JPL
73899	1997 EV_{49}	—	March 5, 1997	La Silla	E. W. Elst	MAS	1.5 km	MPC · JPL
73900	1997 FD	—	March 19, 1997	Cloudcroft	W. Offutt	·	2.2 km	MPC · JPL

== 73901–74000 ==
back to top

Designation			Discovery			Properties		Ref
Permanent	Provisional	Named after	Date	Site	Discoverer(s)	Category	Diam.	Ref
73901	1997 FD_{5}	—	March 31, 1997	Socorro	LINEAR	·	3.8 km	MPC · JPL
73902	1997 GX_{5}	—	April 2, 1997	Socorro	LINEAR	MAS	1.5 km	MPC · JPL
73903	1997 GZ_{9}	—	April 3, 1997	Socorro	LINEAR	·	2.6 km	MPC · JPL
73904	1997 GM_{10}	—	April 3, 1997	Socorro	LINEAR	·	2.9 km	MPC · JPL
73905	1997 GB_{12}	—	April 3, 1997	Socorro	LINEAR	NYS	1.9 km	MPC · JPL
73906	1997 GE_{15}	—	April 3, 1997	Socorro	LINEAR	·	2.6 km	MPC · JPL
73907	1997 GG_{15}	—	April 3, 1997	Socorro	LINEAR	·	2.3 km	MPC · JPL
73908	1997 GS_{18}	—	April 3, 1997	Socorro	LINEAR	·	4.6 km	MPC · JPL
73909	1997 GW_{18}	—	April 3, 1997	Socorro	LINEAR	·	2.3 km	MPC · JPL
73910	1997 GU_{20}	—	April 6, 1997	Socorro	LINEAR	·	3.4 km	MPC · JPL
73911	1997 GD_{22}	—	April 6, 1997	Socorro	LINEAR	NYS	2.5 km	MPC · JPL
73912	1997 GV_{28}	—	April 8, 1997	Kitt Peak	Spacewatch	MAS	1.5 km	MPC · JPL
73913	1997 GZ_{35}	—	April 6, 1997	Socorro	LINEAR	V	1.6 km	MPC · JPL
73914	1997 GN_{40}	—	April 7, 1997	La Silla	E. W. Elst	·	3.8 km	MPC · JPL
73915	1997 GD_{43}	—	April 3, 1997	Socorro	LINEAR	NYS	2.3 km	MPC · JPL
73916	1997 HD_{1}	—	April 27, 1997	Kitt Peak	Spacewatch	·	2.0 km	MPC · JPL
73917	1997 HS_{1}	—	April 28, 1997	Kitt Peak	Spacewatch	·	4.0 km	MPC · JPL
73918	1997 HA_{10}	—	April 30, 1997	Socorro	LINEAR	(21344)	4.5 km	MPC · JPL
73919	1997 HV_{10}	—	April 30, 1997	Socorro	LINEAR	·	2.5 km	MPC · JPL
73920	1997 HE_{12}	—	April 30, 1997	Socorro	LINEAR	·	4.0 km	MPC · JPL
73921	1997 LT_{4}	—	June 7, 1997	Kitt Peak	Spacewatch	PAD	4.4 km	MPC · JPL
73922	1997 LZ_{12}	—	June 7, 1997	La Silla	E. W. Elst	·	2.5 km	MPC · JPL
73923	1997 MU_{1}	—	June 30, 1997	Prescott	P. G. Comba	·	6.1 km	MPC · JPL
73924	1997 MN_{3}	—	June 28, 1997	Socorro	LINEAR	H	1.5 km	MPC · JPL
73925	1997 MS_{6}	—	June 28, 1997	Kitt Peak	Spacewatch	·	3.6 km	MPC · JPL
73926	1997 ML_{9}	—	June 26, 1997	Kitt Peak	Spacewatch	EOS	4.2 km	MPC · JPL
73927	1997 MK_{11}	—	June 28, 1997	Socorro	LINEAR	·	3.1 km	MPC · JPL
73928	1997 NK_{2}	—	July 3, 1997	Kitt Peak	Spacewatch	·	5.9 km	MPC · JPL
73929	1997 OK_{1}	—	July 28, 1997	Kitt Peak	Spacewatch	·	2.8 km	MPC · JPL
73930	1997 PV	—	August 3, 1997	Caussols	ODAS	·	6.0 km	MPC · JPL
73931	1997 PK_{3}	—	August 3, 1997	Xinglong	SCAP	·	4.8 km	MPC · JPL
73932	1997 QD_{5}	—	August 25, 1997	Reedy Creek	J. Broughton	·	10 km	MPC · JPL
73933 Philippeamram	1997 RW_{1}	Philippeamram	September 3, 1997	Caussols	ODAS	LIX	7.7 km	MPC · JPL
73934	1997 SO_{2}	—	September 24, 1997	Ondřejov	L. Kotková	·	6.2 km	MPC · JPL
73935	1997 SH_{3}	—	September 26, 1997	Kleť	Kleť	·	5.5 km	MPC · JPL
73936 Takeyamamoto	1997 SF_{4}	Takeyamamoto	September 24, 1997	Moriyama	Ikari, Y.	·	8.3 km	MPC · JPL
73937	1997 SV_{6}	—	September 23, 1997	Kitt Peak	Spacewatch	·	2.5 km	MPC · JPL
73938	1997 SH_{7}	—	September 23, 1997	Kitt Peak	Spacewatch	EOS	6.2 km	MPC · JPL
73939	1997 SG_{10}	—	September 26, 1997	Xinglong	SCAP	·	3.4 km	MPC · JPL
73940	1997 SX_{10}	—	September 27, 1997	Oizumi	T. Kobayashi	·	4.3 km	MPC · JPL
73941	1997 SN_{11}	—	September 27, 1997	Kitt Peak	Spacewatch	THM	3.8 km	MPC · JPL
73942	1997 SN_{12}	—	September 27, 1997	Kitt Peak	Spacewatch	·	3.6 km	MPC · JPL
73943	1997 SE_{15}	—	September 28, 1997	Kitt Peak	Spacewatch	HYG	5.5 km	MPC · JPL
73944	1997 SG_{24}	—	September 30, 1997	Kitt Peak	Spacewatch	·	5.5 km	MPC · JPL
73945	1997 SS_{28}	—	September 28, 1997	Kitt Peak	Spacewatch	·	8.4 km	MPC · JPL
73946	1997 SD_{32}	—	September 24, 1997	Bergisch Gladbach	W. Bickel	·	5.2 km	MPC · JPL
73947	1997 TV_{3}	—	October 3, 1997	Caussols	ODAS	HYG	7.0 km	MPC · JPL
73948	1997 TK_{12}	—	October 2, 1997	Kitt Peak	Spacewatch	·	6.2 km	MPC · JPL
73949	1997 TT_{12}	—	October 2, 1997	Kitt Peak	Spacewatch	·	6.9 km	MPC · JPL
73950	1997 TE_{13}	—	October 3, 1997	Kitt Peak	Spacewatch	KOR	2.8 km	MPC · JPL
73951	1997 UK_{8}	—	October 21, 1997	Church Stretton	S. P. Laurie	(3460)	7.5 km	MPC · JPL
73952	1997 UQ_{17}	—	October 25, 1997	Kitt Peak	Spacewatch	EOS · slow	4.6 km	MPC · JPL
73953	1997 UN_{20}	—	October 27, 1997	Haleakala	AMOS	·	5.5 km	MPC · JPL
73954	1997 UR_{20}	—	October 20, 1997	Xinglong	SCAP	·	6.1 km	MPC · JPL
73955 Asaka	1997 UE_{21}	Asaka	October 22, 1997	Saji	Saji	·	6.6 km	MPC · JPL
73956	1997 VQ_{6}	—	November 5, 1997	Nachi-Katsuura	Y. Shimizu, T. Urata	·	8.2 km	MPC · JPL
73957	1997 VF_{7}	—	November 2, 1997	Xinglong	SCAP	·	4.8 km	MPC · JPL
73958	1997 WN	—	November 18, 1997	Oizumi	T. Kobayashi	·	10 km	MPC · JPL
73959	1997 WV_{11}	—	November 22, 1997	Kitt Peak	Spacewatch	THM	7.2 km	MPC · JPL
73960	1997 WE_{21}	—	November 23, 1997	Oizumi	T. Kobayashi	·	8.8 km	MPC · JPL
73961	1997 WP_{25}	—	November 30, 1997	Kitt Peak	Spacewatch	T_{j} (2.97)	14 km	MPC · JPL
73962	1997 WN_{40}	—	November 29, 1997	Socorro	LINEAR	·	5.4 km	MPC · JPL
73963	1997 WO_{41}	—	November 29, 1997	Socorro	LINEAR	·	9.6 km	MPC · JPL
73964	1997 WK_{42}	—	November 29, 1997	Socorro	LINEAR	·	3.6 km	MPC · JPL
73965 Michelmathieu	1997 XF_{5}	Michelmathieu	December 6, 1997	Caussols	ODAS	URS	11 km	MPC · JPL
73966	1997 XG_{10}	—	December 6, 1997	Cloudcroft	W. Offutt	·	4.0 km	MPC · JPL
73967	1997 XX_{10}	—	December 4, 1997	Xinglong	SCAP	HYG	7.8 km	MPC · JPL
73968	1997 YQ_{4}	—	December 24, 1997	Chichibu	N. Satō	·	9.9 km	MPC · JPL
73969	1997 YK_{12}	—	December 21, 1997	Kitt Peak	Spacewatch	·	9.9 km	MPC · JPL
73970	1998 AX_{6}	—	January 5, 1998	Xinglong	SCAP	·	2.9 km	MPC · JPL
73971	1998 BN_{8}	—	January 25, 1998	Oizumi	T. Kobayashi	·	4.0 km	MPC · JPL
73972	1998 BA_{18}	—	January 22, 1998	Kitt Peak	Spacewatch	·	10 km	MPC · JPL
73973	1998 BF_{22}	—	January 23, 1998	Kitt Peak	Spacewatch	·	2.0 km	MPC · JPL
73974	1998 BT_{26}	—	January 29, 1998	Modra	L. Kornoš, P. Kolény	URS	10 km	MPC · JPL
73975	1998 BD_{34}	—	January 18, 1998	Kitt Peak	Spacewatch	·	3.8 km	MPC · JPL
73976	1998 BE_{35}	—	January 26, 1998	Kitt Peak	Spacewatch	·	9.7 km	MPC · JPL
73977	1998 BT_{42}	—	January 20, 1998	Socorro	LINEAR	·	11 km	MPC · JPL
73978	1998 DU_{6}	—	February 17, 1998	Kitt Peak	Spacewatch	·	1.7 km	MPC · JPL
73979	1998 DF_{8}	—	February 21, 1998	Xinglong	SCAP	·	1.5 km	MPC · JPL
73980	1998 DV_{8}	—	February 23, 1998	Kitt Peak	Spacewatch	·	2.9 km	MPC · JPL
73981	1998 DE_{16}	—	February 25, 1998	Haleakala	NEAT	·	2.0 km	MPC · JPL
73982	1998 DB_{17}	—	February 23, 1998	Kitt Peak	Spacewatch	TIR	7.4 km	MPC · JPL
73983	1998 DS_{19}	—	February 26, 1998	Kitt Peak	Spacewatch	CYB	12 km	MPC · JPL
73984 Claudebernard	1998 DJ_{20}	Claudebernard	February 26, 1998	Blauvac	R. Roy	·	2.5 km	MPC · JPL
73985	1998 DH_{28}	—	February 23, 1998	Kitt Peak	Spacewatch	·	1.5 km	MPC · JPL
73986	1998 DR_{29}	—	February 28, 1998	Kitt Peak	Spacewatch	·	1.8 km	MPC · JPL
73987	1998 EA_{2}	—	March 2, 1998	Caussols	ODAS	·	2.7 km	MPC · JPL
73988	1998 EJ_{11}	—	March 1, 1998	La Silla	E. W. Elst	·	2.4 km	MPC · JPL
73989	1998 ED_{12}	—	March 1, 1998	La Silla	E. W. Elst	V	2.1 km	MPC · JPL
73990	1998 EU_{12}	—	March 1, 1998	La Silla	E. W. Elst	·	2.7 km	MPC · JPL
73991	1998 FP	—	March 18, 1998	Kitt Peak	Spacewatch	MAS	1.3 km	MPC · JPL
73992	1998 FK_{1}	—	March 20, 1998	Woomera	F. B. Zoltowski	·	1.9 km	MPC · JPL
73993	1998 FZ_{4}	—	March 22, 1998	Prescott	P. G. Comba	·	2.4 km	MPC · JPL
73994	1998 FM_{21}	—	March 20, 1998	Socorro	LINEAR	·	1.6 km	MPC · JPL
73995	1998 FQ_{25}	—	March 20, 1998	Socorro	LINEAR	CYB	7.4 km	MPC · JPL
73996	1998 FU_{28}	—	March 20, 1998	Socorro	LINEAR	TIR · slow	6.7 km	MPC · JPL
73997	1998 FB_{38}	—	March 20, 1998	Socorro	LINEAR	·	1.4 km	MPC · JPL
73998	1998 FR_{40}	—	March 20, 1998	Socorro	LINEAR	·	1.7 km	MPC · JPL
73999	1998 FP_{43}	—	March 20, 1998	Socorro	LINEAR	·	3.6 km	MPC · JPL
74000	1998 FM_{44}	—	March 20, 1998	Socorro	LINEAR	NYS	2.3 km	MPC · JPL

back to top

== See also ==
- Meanings of minor-planet names: 73001–74000
