= Meanings of minor-planet names: 73001–74000 =

As minor planet discoveries are confirmed, they are given a permanent number by the IAU's Minor Planet Center (MPC), and the discoverers can then submit names for them, following the IAU's naming conventions. The list below concerns those minor planets in the specified number-range that have received names, and explains the meanings of those names.

Official naming citations of newly named small Solar System bodies are approved and published in a bulletin by IAU's Working Group for Small Bodies Nomenclature (WGSBN). Before May 2021, citations were published in MPC's Minor Planet Circulars for many decades. Recent citations can also be found on the JPL Small-Body Database (SBDB). Until his death in 2016, German astronomer Lutz D. Schmadel compiled these citations into the Dictionary of Minor Planet Names (DMP) and regularly updated the collection.

Based on Paul Herget's The Names of the Minor Planets, Schmadel also researched the unclear origin of numerous asteroids, most of which had been named prior to World War II. This article incorporates text from this source, which is in the public domain: SBDB New namings may only be added to this list below after official publication as the preannouncement of names is condemned. The WGSBN publishes a comprehensive guideline for the naming rules of non-cometary small Solar System bodies.

== 73001–73100 ==
Named minor planet	Provisional	This minor planet was named for...	Ref · Catalog
73046 Davidmann	2002 EG_{112}	David Mann (born 1941) is a sample-preparation expert who produced high-quality thin sections of Apollo Moon rocks at NASA Johnson Space Center. He has prepared numerous thin sections of rare meteorites for planetary science research, as well as samples for other fields of study including paleontology and petroleum exploration.	JPL · 73046
73059 Kaunas	2002 FO_{5}	Kaunas, the second largest city in Lithuania with 400,000 inhabitants. It is situated at the confluence of the two largest Lithuanian rivers—the Neris and the Nemunas. Kaunas was first mentioned in written sources in 1361. It was fated to become the temporary capital of Lithuania during 1919–1940.	JPL · 73059
73073 Jannaleuty	2002 GA_{1}	Janna Leuty (born 1976) is the wife of astronomer Guy Wells.	IAU · 73073
73079 Davidbaltimore	2002 GX_{8}	David Baltimore (born 1938), an American biologist renowned for his Nobel Prize-winning research and for his vision and leadership as the seventh president of the California Institute of Technology (1997–2006).	JPL · 73079

== 73101–73200 ==
back to top

Named minor planet	Provisional	This minor planet was named for...	Ref · Catalog
73199 Orlece	2002 JY_{12}	The Orthopedic Learning Centre of the Department of Orthopedics and Traumatology at the Chinese University of Hong Kong was established in 1999. With the mission statement "Learn and Practice to Serve Better", it provides comprehensive medical education to the orthopaedic community locally and internationally.	JPL · 73199

== 73201–73300 ==
back to top

Named minor planet	Provisional	This minor planet was named for...	Ref · Catalog
There are no named minor planets in this number range

== 73301–73400 ==
back to top

Named minor planet	Provisional	This minor planet was named for...	Ref · Catalog
73342 Guyunusa	2002 JX_{115}	Michella Jougousa Gununusa (1806–1834) was a native Indian sold by Uruguay for exhibition in France. She was 27 years old when she died in Lyons only a year after her arrival. She and fellow captive Vaimaca had a daughter, born in France. Another of the "last charrás", Tacuabé, took care of the baby and escaped with her to an unknown place.	JPL · 73342
73358 Kitwhitten	2002 KT_{1}	Kit Whitten (born 1986) is the archivist at the Observatories of the Carnegie Institution for Science. She has tracked down requested archived plates within their plate library in search of precovery NEO observations.	JPL · 73358

== 73401–73500 ==
back to top

Named minor planet	Provisional	This minor planet was named for...	Ref · Catalog
73442 Feruglio	2002 NE_{5}	Chiara Feruglio (born 1978), an Italian astronomer who obtained her degree in astronomy at the University of Padua in 2003, with a thesis on spectroscopy of Seyfert galaxies. Currently a Ph.D. student at the University of Tor Vergata in Rome, she is studying the properties of accretion onto super massive black holes.	JPL · 73442
73453 Ninomanfredi	2002 NJ_{34}	Nino Manfredi (1921–2004), Italian actor born in Castro dei Volsci, Frosinone. His successes as a stage and film actor include L'impiegato (1959), La ballata del boia (1963) and Nell'anno del Signore (1969). He also directed the films L'avventura di un soldato (1962), Per grazia ricevuta (1971) and Nudo di donna (1981).	JPL · 73453
73465 Buonanno	2002 NP_{55}	Roberto Buonanno (born 1947), an Italian astronomer who is an expert in stellar evolution and the director of the Rome Observatory. He created the Planetary Sciences team at the OAR and supported research programs devoted to near-Earth objects and to the study of the physical properties of the small bodies of the Solar System.	JPL · 73465
73491 Robmatson	2002 PO_{164}	Robert D. Matson (born 1962) is an American amateur astronomer and software developer with special interests in planetary science. Besides being a successful meteorite hunter, Matson is internationally recognized for his satellite-tracking software SkyMap. He also found 15 SOHO comets and is credited with more than 200 discoveries of minor planets.	JPL · 73491

== 73501–73600 ==
back to top

Named minor planet	Provisional	This minor planet was named for...	Ref · Catalog
73511 Lovas	2002 YD_{3}	Miklós Lovas (born 1931), a Hungarian astronomer successful discoverer of astronomical objects. He has discovered 42 supernovae, 5 comets and 2 minor planets in the course of the supernova search program at the Konkoly Observatory between 1964 and 1995.	JPL · 73511
73517 Cranbrook	2003 FG_{78}	Cranbrook Institute of Science in Bloomfield Hills, Michigan, is an educational institution that was a formative influence for a number of space scientists, astronomers and educators.	JPL · 73517
73520 Boslough	2003 MB_{1}	Mark Boslough (born 1955) is an American physicist at Sandia National Laboratories. He has computed the most detailed models to date of atmospheric impact phenomena, especially the Tunguska event and the much older impact that produced the Libyan desert glass found in Egypt.	JPL · 73520
73529 Giorgiopalumbo	2003 OF_{1}	Giorgio G.C. Palumbo (1939–2018) was an astrophysicist and a professor at the University of Bologna. He advised dozens of students, contributed to the birth of high energy astronomy, and fostered the growth of cosmic ray physics, thus laying the seeds of modern high energy astrophysics and astroparticle projects.	JPL · 73529
73533 Alonso	2003 OC_{6}	Fernando Alonso (born 1981) is the Spain's most successful Formula One racing driver. With his victory at the 2003 Hungarian Grand Prix he became the youngest winner in the history of Formula One, at just 22 years and 16 days old. His success has spawned "Alonsomania" in Spain.	JPL · 73533
73534 Liviasavioli	2003 OD_{7}	Livia Savioli (born 1986) is an Italian aerospace engineer. She performed research studies on space debris to preserve the orbital environment for future space missions. She is currently looking further in space, working on an exploration mission towards Mars.	JPL · 73534
73539 Carmenperrella	2003 OW_{18}	Carmen Perrella (born 1970) is an Italian amateur astronomer devoted to astronomy public outreach and cometary photometry. She lives in the town of Benevento and in 2015 she founded the first astronomical amateur group in her town. Name proposed by A. Boattini and M. Tombelli.	JPL · 73539
73551 Dariocastellano	2003 QV	Dario Castellano (born 1983) holds a master's degree in Astrophysics and Space Science and a PhD with a thesis related to gravitational waves. He has also been devoted to astronomy public outreach in the town of Benevento, Italy. He is mainly interested in comets, variable stars and exoplanets.	JPL · 73551

== 73601–73700 ==
back to top

Named minor planet	Provisional	This minor planet was named for...	Ref · Catalog
73610 Klyuchevskaya	1054 T-3	Klyuchevskaja is an active 4750-m volcano on the Kamchatka Peninsula in the Russian Far East.	JPL · 73610
73637 Guneus	1973 SX_{1}	Guneus, from Greek mythology. He was a warrior from Cyphus, and one of the Achaean leaders in the Trojan War.	JPL · 73637
73638 Likhanov	1975 VC_{9}	Albert Anatolievich Likhanov (born 1935), a famous Russian writer, academician of the Russian Academy of Education, professor at several universities, and founder and head of Russia's largest children's charity fund, Russian Children Foundation.	JPL · 73638
73640 Biermann	1977 RM	Ludwig Biermann (1907–1986), a German astrophysicist who was the first director of the Max Planck Institute for Astrophysics. He made pioneering studies on stellar convection and the solar chromosphere and corona. His 1951 study of the structural changes in the tail of comet C/1942 X1 provided the first evidence of the existence of the solar wind.	JPL · 73640
73670 Kurthopf	1982 QP	Kurt Hopf (born 1952) is a head teacher of the primary school in Hof, Germany. With enthusiasm and expertise he directed the Hof Public Observatory from 1976 until 2003 and has published astronomical articles and educational material for children. The name was suggested by G. and D. Heinlein (Src).	JPL · 73670
73686 Nussdorf	1990 TV_{1}	The village of Nussdorf (Nußdorf in Landau) situated in Germany's Palatinate region. The village was named after the abundant walnut trees and first mentioned in the year 802. It is well known for its wine-growing tradition and for its pursuit for harmony between nature and culture.	JPL · 73686
73687 Thomas Aquinas	1990 TQ_{2}	Saint Thomas Aquinas, Italian Catholic philosopher and theologian	JPL · 73687
73692 Gürtler	1991 RL_{3}	Joachim Gürtler (born 1939), a German astronomer who researched and lectured at the Astrophysical Institute of the University of Jena. His main research field was the interstellar medium. He is co-discoverer of the IR carbon dioxide ice band in spectra of molecular clouds. The name was suggested by the first discoverer.	JPL · 73692
73693 Dorschner	1991 RQ_{3}	Johann M. Dorschner (born 1939), a German astronomer who researched and lectured at the Astrophysical Institute of the University of Jena. His main research field was interstellar and circumstellar dust. He established the Jena laboratory astrophysics branch. The name was suggested by the first discoverer.	JPL · 73693
73699 Landaupfalz	1991 TH_{3}	Landau/Pfalz is a German university town in southern Rhineland-Palatinate, embedded in vineyards and surrounded by wine-growing villages.	JPL · 73699
73700 von Kues	1991 TW_{4}	Nicholas of Cusa (1401–1464), was a German theologian, mathematician, scholar, experimental scientist and influential philosopher, born near Trier. He stressed the incomplete nature of man's knowledge of god and of the Universe. His paper Perfectio mathematica (1458) anticipates infinitesimal methods.	JPL · 73700

== 73701–73800 ==
back to top

Named minor planet	Provisional	This minor planet was named for...	Ref · Catalog
73701 Siegfriedbauer	1991 TU_{5}	Siegfried J. Bauer (born 1930) is an Austrian professor emeritus of meteorology and geophysics at the University of Graz. He was associate director of the NASA Goddard Space Flight Center and is a full member of the Austrian Academy of Sciences. His research focuses on the atmospheres of Venus, Mars and Titan.	JPL · 73701
73703 Billings	1991 TL_{15}	Gary W. Billings is a Canadian geophysicist and amateur astronomer in Calgary, Alberta. He discovered five minor planets in 1999. More recently, he has conducted extensive CCD photometry of variable stars in collaboration with observers worldwide. He served as a council member of the AAVSO from 2002 to 2004.	JPL · 73703
73704 Hladiuk	1991 TW_{15}	Donald W. Hladiuk (born 1957) is a Canadian geologist in Calgary, Alberta. For over 20 years, he has presented sky highlights on a local radio morning show. He has led numerous astronomical expeditions with the Calgary chapter of the Royal Astronomical Society of Canada, of which he has twice been president.	JPL · 73704
73767 Bibiandersson	1994 PQ_{9}	Bibi Andersson (1935–2019), a Swedish screen actress who studied at the legendary Royal Dramatic Theatre School in Stockholm. She became well known for Wild Strawberries (1957) directed by Ingmar Bergman. In 1963, she received the Silver Bear for Best Actress in Berlin.	JPL · 73767
73769 Delphi	1994 PN_{12}	The ancient sanctuary of Delphi, considered the centre of the world by the ancient Greek. Delphi lies on the south-west slopes of the Parnassos mountain, in the valley of the river Phokis, and is the most renowned archaeological site in Greece.	JPL · 73769
73782 Yanagida	1994 TD_{15}	The Japanese village of Yanagida located in the center of Noto peninsula. This village is home of the Yanagida Astronomical Observatory (417), where this minor planet was discovered. In March 2005, the village and two neighboring towns, Noto and Uchiura, were merged to form a new town.	JPL · 73782

== 73801–73900 ==
back to top

Named minor planet	Provisional	This minor planet was named for...	Ref · Catalog
73819 Isaootuki	1995 WV_{6}	Isao Otuki (born 1958) became a member of the Miyagi Abukuma Astronomical Society in 1974 and actively popularizes astronomy.	JPL · 73819
73827 Nakanohoshinokai	1996 AB_{3}	The Nakano Star Gazers Club of Nakano, Tokyo, was founded in 1973. Although Nakano has the brightest night sky in Japan, the members have contributed to many outreach activities in astronomy.	JPL · 73827
73857 Hitaneichi	1996 WA_{3}	Hiroshi Taneichi (born 1927), a Japanese professor emeritus at Yamagata University, who studied photo-reactions at the Laboratory of Nuclear Science, Tohoku University. He is now a member of the Yamagata Astronomical Society.	JPL · 73857
73862 Mochigasechugaku	1996 XN_{32}	"Mochigase chugaku" was a junior high school in Mochigase, Japan. It was established in 1956 and closed in 2013.	JPL · 73862
73872 Stefanoragazzi	1997 AO_{17}	Stefano Ragazzi (born 1954) is a professor at the Milan Bicocca University and director of Gran Sasso National Laboratory INAF.	JPL · 73872
73883 Asteraude	1997 DQ	An "astéraude" is an asteroid discovered by one of the members of the French AUDÉ society (French: Association des utilisateurs de détecteurs électroniques. This minor planet was the first of a series of discoveries made by members of the association, which discovered about 50 asteroids every year since 1997 (Src)	JPL · 73883
73885 Kalaymoodley	1997 EV	Kalayvany Moodley (born 1969), a South African friend of the Italian discoverer Andrea Boattini. Born in Johannesburg, she studied hotel management in Durban, where she currently lives and runs a convention center.	JPL · 73885
73891 Pietromennea	1997 ED_{23}	Pietro Mennea (1952–2013) was an Italian sprinter, who won a gold medal in the 200-m at the 1980 Moscow Olympics. In 1979, he set a 200-m world record of 19.72s, a record that stood for almost seventeen years.	JPL · 73891

== 73901–74000 ==
back to top

Named minor planet	Provisional	This minor planet was named for...	Ref · Catalog
73933 Philippeamram	1997 RW_{1}	Philippe Amram, French astronomer.	IAU · 73933
73936 Takeyamamoto	1997 SF_{4}	Takeshi Yamamoto (1932–2005) was a Japanese amateur astronomer who studied astronomy under Issei Yamamoto. He devoted himself to educating the general public about astronomy in the city of Moriyama	JPL · 73936
73955 Asaka	1997 UE_{21}	Asaka is reclaimed land in Koriyama city, Fukushima prefecture.	JPL · 73955
73984 Claudebernard	1998 DJ_{20}	Claude Bernard (born 1931) worked in the French Railways (SNCF) as a train driver. He is an avid solar observer who has gathered visual observations of sunspots and tried to correlate them with terrestrial phenomena. He co-founded the astronomical association of the SNCF.	JPL · 73984

back to top

Preceded by 72,001–73,000	Meanings of minor-planet names List of minor planets: 73,001–74,000	Succeeded by 74,001–75,000
