= Saji Observatory =

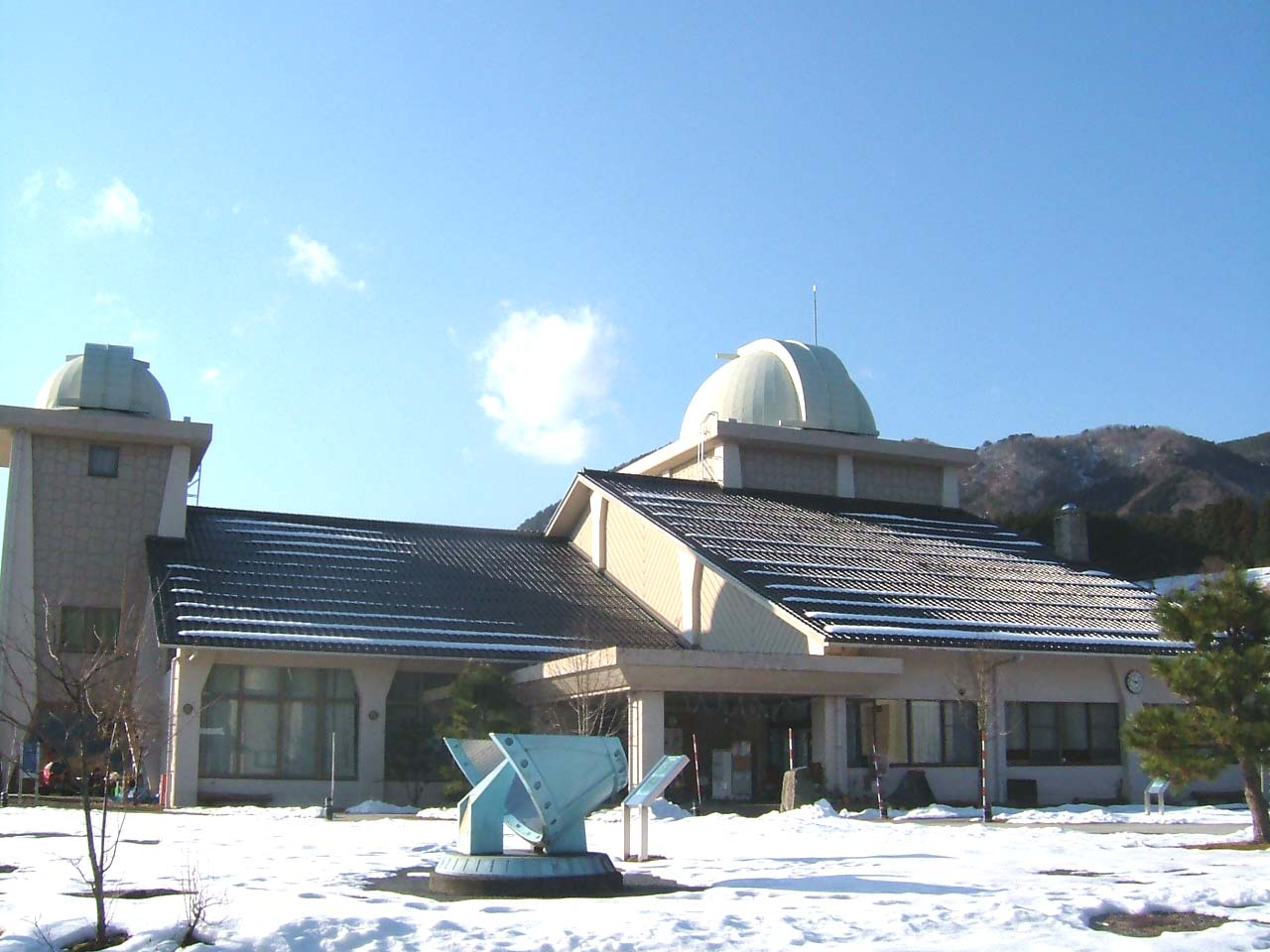
- Alternative names: Tottori Saji AstroPark
- Observatory code: 867
- Location: Saji, Tottori, Japan
- Coordinates: 35°20′20″N 134°07′20″E

Telescopes
- Unnamed: 1.03m reflecting telescope
- Related media on Commons

The Saji Observatory is located in Saji, Tottori, Japan. Distance from rotation axis and height above equatorial plane (in Earth radii): 0.81671 +0.57522. Longitude (degrees East): 134.1222

Observatory code is 867.
