= Meanings of minor-planet names: 100001–101000 =

As minor planet discoveries are confirmed, they are given a permanent number by the IAU's Minor Planet Center (MPC), and the discoverers can then submit names for them, following the IAU's naming conventions. The list below concerns those minor planets in the specified number-range that have received names, and explains the meanings of those names.

Official naming citations of newly named small Solar System bodies are approved and published in a bulletin by IAU's Working Group for Small Bodies Nomenclature (WGSBN). Before May 2021, citations were published in MPC's Minor Planet Circulars for many decades. Recent citations can also be found on the JPL Small-Body Database (SBDB). Until his death in 2016, German astronomer Lutz D. Schmadel compiled these citations into the Dictionary of Minor Planet Names (DMP) and regularly updated the collection.

Based on Paul Herget's The Names of the Minor Planets, Schmadel also researched the unclear origin of numerous asteroids, most of which had been named prior to World War II. This article incorporates text from this source, which is in the public domain: SBDB New namings may only be added to this list below after official publication as the preannouncement of names is condemned. The WGSBN publishes a comprehensive guideline for the naming rules of non-cometary small Solar System bodies.

== 100001–100100 ==
Named minor planet	Provisional	This minor planet was named for...	Ref · Catalog
100007 Peters	1988 CP_{4}	Christian Heinrich Friedrich Peters (1813–1890), a German-American astronomer and discoverer of asteroids and of comet 80P/Peters–Hartley	JPL · 100007
100015 Sutcliffe	1989 SR_{7}	Stuart Sutcliffe was a British painter and musician, and was the original bassist of the Beatles from 1960 to 1961.	IAU · 100015
100016 Petebest	1989 SD_{8}	Pete Best is a British musician, and was a drummer of the Beatles from 1960 to 1962.	IAU · 100016
100019 Gregorianik	1989 UO_{7}	Gregorian chant (German shortening Gregorianik) a form of monophonic, unaccompanied sacred song of the Roman Catholic Church	JPL · 100019
100027 Hannaharendt	1990 TR_{3}	Hannah Arendt (1906–1975), German philosopher and political theorist	JPL · 100027
100028 von Canstein	1990 TZ_{9}	Carl Hildebrand von Canstein (1667–1719) established the Cansteinsche Bible Society in Halle (Saale) in 1710. Von Canstein was a friend of August Hermann Francke.	JPL · 100028
100029 Varnhagen	1990 TQ_{10}	Rahel Varnhagen (née Levin; 1771–1833), German writer of Jewish descent, the subject of a famous biography by Hannah Arendt	JPL · 100029
100033 Taizé	1991 GV_{10}	Taizé, Saône-et-Loire, Burgundy, France, where the Taizé Community is located	JPL · 100033
100045 Kirchherr	1991 TK_{1}	Astrid Kirchherr, German photographer and artist. She is best known for the photographs she took of the original members of The Beatles in Hamburg in 1960. Astrid took “behind the scenes” photographs of the group during the filming of A Hard Day's Night (1964).	IAU · 100045
100046 Worms	1991 TT_{6}	Worms is one of the oldest German towns.	JPL · 100046
100047 Leobaeck	1991 TU_{6}	Rabbi Leo Baeck (1873–1956), German-Jewish scholar, president of both the Council of Jews from Germany and the World Union for Progressive Judaism	JPL · 100047
100049 Césarann	1991 TD_{15}	César Hernandez (born 1959) and Ann Hernandez (born 1964), brother-in-law and sister, respectively, of the discoverer Andrew Lowe	JPL · 100049
100050 Carloshernandez	1991 TR_{15}	Carlos R. Hernandez (born 1996), nephew of the discoverer Andrew Lowe	JPL · 100050
100051 Davidhernandez	1991 TC_{16}	David A. Hernandez (born 1998), nephew of the discoverer Andrew Lowe	JPL · 100051
100053 Danstinebring	1992 AR_{2}	Dan Stinebring (b. 1953) obtained degrees from Williams College and Cornell, and is an Oberlin College professor emeritus. He is a senior researcher in the NANOGrav (North American Nanohertz Observatory for Gravitational waves) consortium, which uses high-precision timing of pulsars to study ultra-low-frequency gravitational waves.	IAU · 100053
100077 Tertzakian	1992 PZ_{6}	Peter Tertzakian (born 1961), Canadian author and energy economist	JPL · 100077
100084 Gußmann	1992 SY_{13}	Ernst-August Gußmann (b. 1933), a German theoretical astrophysicist based in Potsdam.	IAU · 100084

== 100101–100200 ==
back to top

Named minor planet	Provisional	This minor planet was named for...	Ref · Catalog
100122 Alpes-Maritimes	1993 PE_{7}	Alpes-Maritimes, French département where the discovery site is located	JPL · 100122
100133 Demosthenes	1993 RG_{14}	Demosthenes (384–322 BC), a famous orator of ancient Athens who was considered by Cicero as the greatest among all orators.	JPL · 100133

== 100201–100300 ==
back to top

Named minor planet	Provisional	This minor planet was named for...	Ref · Catalog
100229 Jeanbailly	1994 PB_{18}	Jean Sylvain Bailly (1736–1793), a French astronomer, mathematician and freemason. In 1759 he calculated an orbit for the next appearance of Halley's comet.	JPL · 100229
100231 Monceau	1994 PB_{20}	Henri-Louis Duhamel du Monceau (1700–1782), a French physician, naval engineer and botanist.	JPL · 100231
100266 Sadamisaki	1994 TV_{14}	Sadamisaki peninsula, in the westernmost part of Shikoku, the narrowest peninsula in Japan	JPL · 100266
100267 JAXA	1994 TK_{15}	JAXA, the Japan Aerospace Exploration Agency, where the second discoverer works, on the occasion of the 5th anniversary of JAXA in 2008	JPL · 100267
100268 Rosenthal	1994 TL_{16}	Hans Rosenthal (1925–1987), German Holocaust survivor, later radio and television moderator, member of the Council of Jews from Germany	JPL · 100268
100292 Harmandir	1995 DP_{2}	The Golden Temple (Harmandir Sahib), located in the Indian state of Punjab, is the spiritual and cultural center for the Sikh religion.	JPL · 100292

== 100301–100400 ==
back to top

Named minor planet	Provisional	This minor planet was named for...	Ref · Catalog
100308 ČAS	1995 HB	The Česká Astronomická Společnost (Czech Astronomical Society) was established in Prague in 1917.	JPL · 100308
100309 Misuzukaneko	1995 HD	Misuzu Kaneko (1903–1930), a Japanese poet and songwriter, who composed as many as 512 poems.	JPL · 100309

== 100401–100500 ==
back to top

Named minor planet	Provisional	This minor planet was named for...	Ref · Catalog
100416 Syang	1996 CB	Stephenson Yang (born 1954), Canadian astronomer and exoplanet discoverer	JPL · 100416
100417 Philipglass	1996 EC	Philip Glass (born 1937), American composer	JPL · 100417
100433 Hyakusyuko	1996 KU_{1}	Nagai Hyakusyuko is the name of the dam lake in Nagai city, Yamagata Prefecture, Japan.	JPL · 100433
100434 Jinyilian	1996 LJ	Jin Yilian (born 1929), academic of the China Academy of Engineering	JPL · 100434
100445 Pisa	1996 RA_{4}	The Italian city of Pisa in Tuscany, known for its Leaning Tower and several other historic churches and medieval palaces.	IAU · 100445
100456 Chichén Itzá	1996 TH	Chichén Itzá, a large pre-Columbian city built by the Maya during the late classic period. The archaeological site is located in Yucatán State, Mexico.	JPL · 100456
100483 NAOJ	1996 US_{3}	NAOJ, the National Astronomical Observatory of Japan, on the occasion of its twentieth anniversary	JPL · 100483
100485 Russelldavies	1996 VX	Dennis Russell Davies (born 1944), American pianist and conductor of the Bruckner Orchestra Linz from 2002 and musical director of the Basel Symphony Orchestra from 2009	JPL · 100485

== 100501–100600 ==
back to top

Named minor planet	Provisional	This minor planet was named for...	Ref · Catalog
100519 Bombig	1997 BE_{2}	Anna Bombig (1919–2013), Italian teacher and poet of the Italian region of Friuli	JPL · 100519
100553 Dariofo	1997 GD	Dario Fo (1926–2016), Italian satirist, playwright, theatre director, actor, composer and recipient of the 1997 Nobel Prize in Literature	JPL · 100553
100596 Perrett	1997 PN_{2}	Kathryn M. Perrett (born 1971), Canadian astrophysicist, expert in galactic dynamics, and friend and colleague of the discoverer, David D. Balam	JPL · 100596
100600 Davidfossé	1997 RX_{1}	David Fossé (b. 1974), a French science journalist.	IAU · 100600

== 100601–100700 ==
back to top

Named minor planet	Provisional	This minor planet was named for...	Ref · Catalog
100604 Lundy	1997 RY_{9}	Lundy, English island in the Bristol Channel	JPL · 100604
100641 Cledassou	1997 VO_{4}	Rodolphe Cledassou (1965–2023), a French space engineer.	IAU · 100641
100675 Chuyanakahara	1997 XP_{2}	Chūya Nakahara (1907–1937), Japanese poet	JPL · 100675
100691 Hasetoshitsuka	1997 YF_{7}	Hase Toshitsuka (1903–1991), a Japanese businessman.	JPL · 100691

== 100701–100800 ==
back to top

Named minor planet	Provisional	This minor planet was named for...	Ref · Catalog
100726 Marcoiozzi	1998 BY_{43}	Marco Iozzi (born 1965), an Italian amateur astronomer and member of the astrometry team at Beppe Forti Astronomical Observatory (K83) in Montelupo Fiorentino, Tuscany.	IAU · 100726
100728 Kamenice n Lipou	1998 CK	Kamenice nad Lipou, small town situated in the Bohemian-Moravian Highlands of the Czech Republic	IAU · 100728
100731 Ara Pacis	1998 DO	Ara Pacis, located in Rome, is an altar dedicated to Pax, the Roman goddess of peace.	JPL · 100731
100732 Blankavalois	1998 DQ	Blanche of Valois (or Blanka of Valois, 1316–1348) was the first wife of Holy Roman Emperor and King of Bohemia Charles IV	JPL · 100732
100733 Annafalcká	1998 DA_{1}	Anne of Bavaria (or Anna Falcká, 1329–1353) was the second wife of Roman Emperor and King of Bohemia Charles IV	JPL · 100733
100734 Annasvídnická	1998 DB_{1}	Anna von Schweidnitz (Anna Svídnická; 1339–1362) was the third wife of Roman Emperor and King of Bohemia Charles IV	JPL · 100734
100735 Alpomořanská	1998 DE_{1}	Elizabeth of Pomerania (or Alžběta Pomořanská, c. 1347–1393) was the fourth and final wife of Roman Emperor and King of Bohemia Charles IV.	JPL · 100735

== 100801–100900 ==
back to top

Named minor planet	Provisional	This minor planet was named for...	Ref · Catalog
100897 Piatra Neamt	1998 JW_{3}	Piatra Neamț, capital city of Neamț County in the region of Moldavia, eastern Romania	JPL · 100897

== 100901–101000 ==
back to top

Named minor planet	Provisional	This minor planet was named for...	Ref · Catalog
100924 Luctuymans	1998 LT_{3}	Luc Tuymans (born 1958), Belgian painter	JPL · 100924
100934 Marthanussbaum	1998 MN_{41}	Martha Nussbaum (born 1947), American philosopher at the University of Chicago.	JPL · 100934
100936 Mekong	1998 ME_{43}	The Mekong is a 4350-kilometre river flowing through China, Myanmar, Laos, Thailand, Cambodia and Vietnam.	JPL · 100936
100940 Maunder	1998 MM_{47}	Edward Walter Maunder (1851–1928), a British astronomer	JPL · 100940

back to top

Preceded by 99,001–100,000	Meanings of minor-planet names List of minor planets: 100,001–101,000	Succeeded by 101,001–102,000
