= Jin Yilian =

Chinese computer scientist

- 金怡濂
- Born: 5 September 1929 (age 96); Tianjin, Republic of China
- Education: Tsinghua University
- Awards: Highest Science and Technology Award (2002)
- Scientific career
- Fields: Computer
- Workplaces: Chinese Academy of Engineering

Jin Yilian (Chinese: 金怡濂; pinyin: Jīn Yílián; born September 1929) is a Chinese computer scientist and a pioneer of supercomputing in the country.

== Biography ==
Jin was born in Tianjin, with his ancestral home in Changzhou, Jiangsu. He graduated from the department of electrical engineering of Tsinghua University in 1951. From 1956 to 1958, he studied electronic computer science at the Institute of Fine Mechanics and Computation Technology of Soviet Union Academy of Sciences. Jin was elected an academician of the Chinese Academy of Engineering in 1994.

== Honors and awards ==
In 2002, Jin was the recipient of the prestigious State Preeminent Science and Technology Award, the highest scientific prize awarded in China. Asteroid 100434 Jinyilian, discovered by the Beijing Schmidt CCD Asteroid Program in 1996, was named in his honor. The official naming citation was published by the Minor Planet Center on 19 February 2006 (M.P.C. 55989).
