= List of minor planets: 100001–101000 =

The following is a partial list of minor planets, running from minor-planet number 100001 through 101000, inclusive. The primary data for this and other partial lists is based on JPL's "Small-Body Orbital Elements" and data available from the Minor Planet Center. Critical list information is also provided by the MPC, unless otherwise specified from Lowell Observatory. A detailed description of the table's columns and additional sources are given on the main page including a complete list of every page in this series, and a statistical break-up on the dynamical classification of minor planets.

Also see the summary list of all named bodies in numerical and alphabetical order, and the corresponding naming citations for the number range of this particular list. New namings may only be added to this list after official publication, as the preannouncement of names is condemned by the Working Group for Small Bodies Nomenclature of the International Astronomical Union.

Near-Earth obj.	MBA (inner)	MBA (outer)	Centaur
Mars-crosser	MBA (middle)	Jupiter trojan	Trans-Neptunian obj.
Unclassified

== 100001–100100 ==
Designation			Discovery			Properties		Ref
Permanent	Provisional	Named after	Date	Site	Discoverer(s)	Category	Diam.	Ref
100001	1982 UC_{3}	—	October 20, 1982	Kitt Peak	G. Aldering	·	4.4 km	MPC · JPL
100002	1983 QC_{1}	—	August 30, 1983	Palomar	Gibson, J.	·	2.0 km	MPC · JPL
100003	1983 RN_{3}	—	September 1, 1983	La Silla	H. Debehogne	·	3.3 km	MPC · JPL
100004	1983 VA	—	November 1, 1983	IRAS	IRAS	T_{j} (2.98) · APO +1km	2.7 km	MPC · JPL
100005	1986 RY	—	September 6, 1986	Palomar	E. F. Helin	·	1.5 km	MPC · JPL
100006	1987 DA_{7}	—	February 28, 1987	La Silla	H. Debehogne	·	3.3 km	MPC · JPL
100007 Peters	1988 CP_{4}	Peters	February 13, 1988	La Silla	E. W. Elst	·	7.5 km	MPC · JPL
100008	1988 QZ	—	August 16, 1988	Palomar	C. S. Shoemaker	·	3.2 km	MPC · JPL
100009	1988 RQ_{4}	—	September 1, 1988	La Silla	H. Debehogne	·	1.3 km	MPC · JPL
100010	1988 RN_{12}	—	September 14, 1988	Cerro Tololo	S. J. Bus	·	8.1 km	MPC · JPL
100011	1988 VE_{3}	—	November 11, 1988	Kushiro	S. Ueda, H. Kaneda	·	4.8 km	MPC · JPL
100012	1989 BC_{1}	—	January 25, 1989	Kleť	A. Mrkos	·	6.2 km	MPC · JPL
100013	1989 CD_{3}	—	February 4, 1989	La Silla	E. W. Elst	·	5.3 km	MPC · JPL
100014	1989 SR_{4}	—	September 26, 1989	La Silla	E. W. Elst	·	2.7 km	MPC · JPL
100015 Sutcliffe	1989 SR_{7}	Sutcliffe	September 28, 1989	Palomar	C. S. Shoemaker	moon	2.7 km	MPC · JPL
100016 Petebest	1989 SD_{8}	Petebest	September 28, 1989	Palomar	C. S. Shoemaker	·	2.5 km	MPC · JPL
100017	1989 TN_{2}	—	October 3, 1989	Cerro Tololo	S. J. Bus	·	1.4 km	MPC · JPL
100018	1989 TA_{5}	—	October 7, 1989	La Silla	E. W. Elst	NYS	2.0 km	MPC · JPL
100019 Gregorianik	1989 UO_{7}	Gregorianik	October 23, 1989	Tautenburg Observatory	F. Börngen	·	2.4 km	MPC · JPL
100020	1990 QH_{4}	—	August 23, 1990	Palomar	H. E. Holt	·	3.6 km	MPC · JPL
100021	1990 QV_{7}	—	August 16, 1990	La Silla	E. W. Elst	MAS	2.1 km	MPC · JPL
100022	1990 SG_{5}	—	September 22, 1990	La Silla	E. W. Elst	·	1.6 km	MPC · JPL
100023	1990 SH_{5}	—	September 22, 1990	La Silla	E. W. Elst	·	2.1 km	MPC · JPL
100024	1990 SW_{6}	—	September 22, 1990	La Silla	E. W. Elst	·	2.5 km	MPC · JPL
100025	1990 SY_{6}	—	September 22, 1990	La Silla	E. W. Elst	V	1.8 km	MPC · JPL
100026	1990 ST_{9}	—	September 22, 1990	La Silla	E. W. Elst	·	2.9 km	MPC · JPL
100027 Hannaharendt	1990 TR_{3}	Hannaharendt	October 12, 1990	Tautenburg Observatory	F. Börngen, L. D. Schmadel	NYS	2.3 km	MPC · JPL
100028 von Canstein	1990 TZ_{9}	von Canstein	October 10, 1990	Tautenburg Observatory	F. Börngen, L. D. Schmadel	·	5.7 km	MPC · JPL
100029 Varnhagen	1990 TQ_{10}	Varnhagen	October 10, 1990	Tautenburg Observatory	F. Börngen, L. D. Schmadel	·	5.6 km	MPC · JPL
100030	1990 WN_{1}	—	November 18, 1990	La Silla	E. W. Elst	·	3.4 km	MPC · JPL
100031	1991 FM_{2}	—	March 20, 1991	La Silla	H. Debehogne	·	5.0 km	MPC · JPL
100032	1991 GU_{6}	—	April 8, 1991	La Silla	E. W. Elst	·	3.6 km	MPC · JPL
100033 Taizé	1991 GV_{10}	Taizé	April 9, 1991	Tautenburg Observatory	F. Börngen	·	6.9 km	MPC · JPL
100034	1991 PN_{1}	—	August 2, 1991	La Silla	E. W. Elst	·	4.0 km	MPC · JPL
100035	1991 PO_{8}	—	August 5, 1991	Palomar	H. E. Holt	·	6.5 km	MPC · JPL
100036	1991 PM_{14}	—	August 6, 1991	Palomar	H. E. Holt	NYS	2.0 km	MPC · JPL
100037	1991 RM	—	September 4, 1991	Palomar	E. F. Helin	·	5.4 km	MPC · JPL
100038	1991 RD_{13}	—	September 13, 1991	Palomar	H. E. Holt	·	2.9 km	MPC · JPL
100039	1991 RO_{16}	—	September 15, 1991	Palomar	H. E. Holt	NYS	1.6 km	MPC · JPL
100040	1991 RQ_{17}	—	September 11, 1991	Palomar	H. E. Holt	T_{j} (2.98)	9.4 km	MPC · JPL
100041	1991 RJ_{28}	—	September 8, 1991	Kitt Peak	Spacewatch	·	3.4 km	MPC · JPL
100042	1991 SJ_{2}	—	September 16, 1991	Palomar	H. E. Holt	·	2.4 km	MPC · JPL
100043	1991 SE_{3}	—	September 29, 1991	Kitt Peak	Spacewatch	·	4.7 km	MPC · JPL
100044	1991 TX	—	October 1, 1991	Siding Spring	R. H. McNaught	·	4.0 km	MPC · JPL
100045 Kirchherr	1991 TK_{1}	Kirchherr	October 5, 1991	Palomar	C. S. Shoemaker	·	5.3 km	MPC · JPL
100046 Worms	1991 TT_{6}	Worms	October 2, 1991	Tautenburg Observatory	F. Börngen, L. D. Schmadel	·	3.6 km	MPC · JPL
100047 Leobaeck	1991 TU_{6}	Leobaeck	October 2, 1991	Tautenburg Observatory	F. Börngen, L. D. Schmadel	NYS	1.8 km	MPC · JPL
100048	1991 TE_{14}	—	October 2, 1991	Palomar	C. P. de Saint-Aignan	T_{j} (2.99) · EUP	9.3 km	MPC · JPL
100049 Césarann	1991 TD_{15}	Césarann	October 6, 1991	Palomar	Lowe, A.	NYS	1.5 km	MPC · JPL
100050 Carloshernandez	1991 TR_{15}	Carloshernandez	October 6, 1991	Palomar	Lowe, A.	·	1.8 km	MPC · JPL
100051 Davidhernandez	1991 TC_{16}	Davidhernandez	October 6, 1991	Palomar	Lowe, A.	·	1.3 km	MPC · JPL
100052	1991 VP_{5}	—	November 7, 1991	Palomar	C. S. Shoemaker	·	6.5 km	MPC · JPL
100053 Danstinebring	1992 AR_{2}	Danstinebring	January 2, 1992	Kitt Peak	Spacewatch	·	2.1 km	MPC · JPL
100054	1992 BG_{4}	—	January 29, 1992	Kitt Peak	Spacewatch	·	1.4 km	MPC · JPL
100055	1992 BK_{4}	—	January 29, 1992	Kitt Peak	Spacewatch	·	2.6 km	MPC · JPL
100056	1992 DZ_{3}	—	February 29, 1992	Kitt Peak	Spacewatch	·	3.1 km	MPC · JPL
100057	1992 DE_{10}	—	February 29, 1992	La Silla	UESAC	EUN	3.0 km	MPC · JPL
100058	1992 EH	—	March 5, 1992	Kitt Peak	Spacewatch	H	920 m	MPC · JPL
100059	1992 EE_{4}	—	March 1, 1992	La Silla	UESAC	RAF	2.0 km	MPC · JPL
100060	1992 ET_{4}	—	March 1, 1992	La Silla	UESAC	JUN	1.8 km	MPC · JPL
100061	1992 EL_{5}	—	March 1, 1992	La Silla	UESAC	·	4.7 km	MPC · JPL
100062	1992 EH_{9}	—	March 2, 1992	La Silla	UESAC	·	2.5 km	MPC · JPL
100063	1992 EY_{13}	—	March 2, 1992	La Silla	UESAC	MAR	2.4 km	MPC · JPL
100064	1992 EL_{20}	—	March 1, 1992	La Silla	UESAC	·	2.3 km	MPC · JPL
100065	1992 ES_{25}	—	March 8, 1992	La Silla	UESAC	·	3.0 km	MPC · JPL
100066	1992 EV_{25}	—	March 8, 1992	La Silla	UESAC	·	3.2 km	MPC · JPL
100067	1992 EY_{26}	—	March 2, 1992	La Silla	UESAC	(5)	2.9 km	MPC · JPL
100068	1992 EH_{28}	—	March 8, 1992	La Silla	UESAC	·	2.7 km	MPC · JPL
100069	1992 ED_{29}	—	March 2, 1992	La Silla	UESAC	·	2.7 km	MPC · JPL
100070	1992 EX_{29}	—	March 3, 1992	La Silla	UESAC	·	2.3 km	MPC · JPL
100071	1992 ET_{30}	—	March 1, 1992	La Silla	UESAC	·	2.2 km	MPC · JPL
100072	1992 EY_{30}	—	March 1, 1992	La Silla	UESAC	·	2.5 km	MPC · JPL
100073	1992 EV_{31}	—	March 1, 1992	La Silla	UESAC	BAR	2.3 km	MPC · JPL
100074	1992 OB_{2}	—	July 26, 1992	La Silla	E. W. Elst	·	2.6 km	MPC · JPL
100075	1992 PS_{1}	—	August 8, 1992	Caussols	E. W. Elst	·	5.1 km	MPC · JPL
100076	1992 PT_{1}	—	August 8, 1992	Caussols	E. W. Elst	·	1.5 km	MPC · JPL
100077 Tertzakian	1992 PZ_{6}	Tertzakian	August 7, 1992	Palomar	Lowe, A.	·	3.7 km	MPC · JPL
100078	1992 RZ_{2}	—	September 2, 1992	La Silla	E. W. Elst	(194)	3.9 km	MPC · JPL
100079	1992 RZ_{4}	—	September 2, 1992	La Silla	E. W. Elst	·	3.1 km	MPC · JPL
100080	1992 RY_{6}	—	September 2, 1992	La Silla	E. W. Elst	DOR	6.0 km	MPC · JPL
100081	1992 SU_{8}	—	September 27, 1992	Kitt Peak	Spacewatch	·	3.4 km	MPC · JPL
100082	1992 SA_{10}	—	September 27, 1992	Kitt Peak	Spacewatch	·	3.7 km	MPC · JPL
100083	1992 SA_{13}	—	September 30, 1992	Kitami	K. Endate, K. Watanabe	·	5.3 km	MPC · JPL
100084 Gußmann	1992 SY_{13}	Gußmann	September 26, 1992	Tautenburg Observatory	F. Börngen, L. D. Schmadel	·	3.4 km	MPC · JPL
100085	1992 UY_{4}	—	October 25, 1992	Palomar	C. S. Shoemaker	AMO · APO +1km · PHA	940 m	MPC · JPL
100086	1992 UG_{7}	—	October 18, 1992	Kitt Peak	Spacewatch	·	1.3 km	MPC · JPL
100087	1993 BW_{9}	—	January 22, 1993	Kitt Peak	Spacewatch	·	5.0 km	MPC · JPL
100088	1993 DC	—	February 18, 1993	Kitt Peak	Spacewatch	·	2.7 km	MPC · JPL
100089	1993 FW_{2}	—	March 23, 1993	Kitt Peak	Spacewatch	·	5.7 km	MPC · JPL
100090	1993 FX_{5}	—	March 17, 1993	La Silla	UESAC	THM	4.6 km	MPC · JPL
100091	1993 FT_{6}	—	March 17, 1993	La Silla	UESAC	·	2.2 km	MPC · JPL
100092	1993 FK_{8}	—	March 17, 1993	La Silla	UESAC	·	1.9 km	MPC · JPL
100093	1993 FL_{10}	—	March 17, 1993	La Silla	UESAC	·	2.5 km	MPC · JPL
100094	1993 FJ_{13}	—	March 17, 1993	La Silla	UESAC	EOS	5.8 km	MPC · JPL
100095	1993 FN_{13}	—	March 17, 1993	La Silla	UESAC	·	2.7 km	MPC · JPL
100096	1993 FG_{18}	—	March 17, 1993	La Silla	UESAC	·	2.5 km	MPC · JPL
100097	1993 FK_{19}	—	March 17, 1993	La Silla	UESAC	WIT	2.3 km	MPC · JPL
100098	1993 FZ_{19}	—	March 17, 1993	La Silla	UESAC	EOS	4.3 km	MPC · JPL
100099	1993 FG_{21}	—	March 21, 1993	La Silla	UESAC	·	3.3 km	MPC · JPL
100100	1993 FB_{25}	—	March 21, 1993	La Silla	UESAC	(11097) · CYB	5.0 km	MPC · JPL

== 100101–100200 ==
back to top

Designation			Discovery			Properties		Ref
Permanent	Provisional	Named after	Date	Site	Discoverer(s)	Category	Diam.	Ref
100101	1993 FZ_{28}	—	March 21, 1993	La Silla	UESAC	·	1.9 km	MPC · JPL
100102	1993 FU_{30}	—	March 19, 1993	La Silla	UESAC	·	2.5 km	MPC · JPL
100103	1993 FC_{33}	—	March 19, 1993	La Silla	UESAC	NYS	1.7 km	MPC · JPL
100104	1993 FQ_{33}	—	March 19, 1993	La Silla	UESAC	NYS	1.6 km	MPC · JPL
100105	1993 FK_{35}	—	March 19, 1993	La Silla	UESAC	·	5.0 km	MPC · JPL
100106	1993 FW_{35}	—	March 19, 1993	La Silla	UESAC	EOS	3.4 km	MPC · JPL
100107	1993 FH_{39}	—	March 19, 1993	La Silla	UESAC	KOR	2.8 km	MPC · JPL
100108	1993 FF_{45}	—	March 19, 1993	La Silla	UESAC	NYS	1.9 km	MPC · JPL
100109	1993 FN_{46}	—	March 19, 1993	La Silla	UESAC	·	5.0 km	MPC · JPL
100110	1993 FV_{47}	—	March 19, 1993	La Silla	UESAC	·	1.8 km	MPC · JPL
100111	1993 FA_{51}	—	March 19, 1993	La Silla	UESAC	·	6.1 km	MPC · JPL
100112	1993 FM_{57}	—	March 17, 1993	La Silla	UESAC	·	1.8 km	MPC · JPL
100113	1993 FW_{73}	—	March 21, 1993	La Silla	UESAC	·	2.6 km	MPC · JPL
100114	1993 FQ_{82}	—	March 19, 1993	La Silla	UESAC	CYB	7.6 km	MPC · JPL
100115	1993 HA_{3}	—	April 19, 1993	Kitt Peak	Spacewatch	·	2.9 km	MPC · JPL
100116	1993 KG_{1}	—	May 21, 1993	Kitt Peak	Spacewatch	·	2.1 km	MPC · JPL
100117	1993 KM_{1}	—	May 25, 1993	Kitt Peak	Spacewatch	·	4.3 km	MPC · JPL
100118	1993 LG_{1}	—	June 13, 1993	Siding Spring	R. H. McNaught	PHO	2.9 km	MPC · JPL
100119	1993 OB	—	July 16, 1993	Palomar	E. F. Helin	·	5.4 km	MPC · JPL
100120	1993 OW_{4}	—	July 20, 1993	La Silla	E. W. Elst	·	5.2 km	MPC · JPL
100121	1993 OP_{7}	—	July 20, 1993	La Silla	E. W. Elst	ADE	4.7 km	MPC · JPL
100122 Alpes-Maritimes	1993 PE_{7}	Alpes-Maritimes	August 15, 1993	Caussols	CERGA	HYG	6.1 km	MPC · JPL
100123	1993 QU_{5}	—	August 17, 1993	Caussols	E. W. Elst	·	2.3 km	MPC · JPL
100124	1993 QD_{7}	—	August 20, 1993	La Silla	E. W. Elst	·	1.4 km	MPC · JPL
100125	1993 QG_{7}	—	August 20, 1993	La Silla	E. W. Elst	·	2.8 km	MPC · JPL
100126	1993 QK_{7}	—	August 20, 1993	La Silla	E. W. Elst	·	2.8 km	MPC · JPL
100127	1993 QA_{8}	—	August 20, 1993	La Silla	E. W. Elst	·	2.4 km	MPC · JPL
100128	1993 QK_{8}	—	August 20, 1993	La Silla	E. W. Elst	·	3.0 km	MPC · JPL
100129	1993 RQ_{1}	—	September 15, 1993	Kitt Peak	Spacewatch	·	1.3 km	MPC · JPL
100130	1993 RD_{3}	—	September 12, 1993	Palomar	E. F. Helin	·	4.1 km	MPC · JPL
100131	1993 RU_{5}	—	September 15, 1993	La Silla	E. W. Elst	·	3.3 km	MPC · JPL
100132	1993 RR_{8}	—	September 14, 1993	La Silla	H. Debehogne, E. W. Elst	NEM	3.7 km	MPC · JPL
100133 Demosthenes	1993 RG_{14}	Demosthenes	September 15, 1993	La Silla	E. W. Elst	3:2 · SHU	9.4 km	MPC · JPL
100134	1993 RT_{14}	—	September 15, 1993	La Silla	E. W. Elst	·	3.2 km	MPC · JPL
100135	1993 RR_{16}	—	September 15, 1993	La Silla	H. Debehogne, E. W. Elst	(5)	1.6 km	MPC · JPL
100136	1993 SM_{4}	—	September 19, 1993	Caussols	E. W. Elst	·	3.3 km	MPC · JPL
100137	1993 SD_{7}	—	September 17, 1993	La Silla	E. W. Elst	·	3.5 km	MPC · JPL
100138	1993 SN_{14}	—	September 16, 1993	La Silla	H. Debehogne, E. W. Elst	·	3.2 km	MPC · JPL
100139	1993 TS	—	October 11, 1993	Kitami	K. Endate, K. Watanabe	·	2.8 km	MPC · JPL
100140	1993 TP_{2}	—	October 9, 1993	Kitt Peak	Spacewatch	·	1.4 km	MPC · JPL
100141	1993 TH_{5}	—	October 8, 1993	Kitt Peak	Spacewatch	·	2.2 km	MPC · JPL
100142	1993 TK_{6}	—	October 9, 1993	Kitt Peak	Spacewatch	(883)	1.4 km	MPC · JPL
100143	1993 TD_{11}	—	October 15, 1993	Kitt Peak	Spacewatch	(5)	2.4 km	MPC · JPL
100144	1993 TM_{14}	—	October 9, 1993	La Silla	E. W. Elst	·	1.2 km	MPC · JPL
100145	1993 TW_{14}	—	October 9, 1993	La Silla	E. W. Elst	AGN	1.8 km	MPC · JPL
100146	1993 TQ_{15}	—	October 9, 1993	La Silla	E. W. Elst	·	4.7 km	MPC · JPL
100147	1993 TV_{15}	—	October 9, 1993	La Silla	E. W. Elst	(5)	2.0 km	MPC · JPL
100148	1993 TT_{16}	—	October 9, 1993	La Silla	E. W. Elst	·	5.2 km	MPC · JPL
100149	1993 TM_{17}	—	October 9, 1993	La Silla	E. W. Elst	·	2.3 km	MPC · JPL
100150	1993 TN_{17}	—	October 9, 1993	La Silla	E. W. Elst	·	1.6 km	MPC · JPL
100151	1993 TT_{17}	—	October 9, 1993	La Silla	E. W. Elst	(5)	2.1 km	MPC · JPL
100152	1993 TN_{19}	—	October 9, 1993	La Silla	E. W. Elst	·	4.6 km	MPC · JPL
100153	1993 TF_{20}	—	October 9, 1993	La Silla	E. W. Elst	·	2.3 km	MPC · JPL
100154	1993 TS_{23}	—	October 9, 1993	La Silla	E. W. Elst	·	3.1 km	MPC · JPL
100155	1993 TG_{25}	—	October 9, 1993	La Silla	E. W. Elst	(5)	1.9 km	MPC · JPL
100156	1993 TD_{26}	—	October 9, 1993	La Silla	E. W. Elst	·	1.9 km	MPC · JPL
100157	1993 TU_{26}	—	October 9, 1993	La Silla	E. W. Elst	·	2.4 km	MPC · JPL
100158	1993 TF_{27}	—	October 9, 1993	La Silla	E. W. Elst	NYS	2.0 km	MPC · JPL
100159	1993 TP_{27}	—	October 9, 1993	La Silla	E. W. Elst	·	3.2 km	MPC · JPL
100160	1993 TS_{27}	—	October 9, 1993	La Silla	E. W. Elst	·	2.4 km	MPC · JPL
100161	1993 TV_{28}	—	October 9, 1993	La Silla	E. W. Elst	KOR	2.4 km	MPC · JPL
100162	1993 TS_{30}	—	October 9, 1993	La Silla	E. W. Elst	·	4.3 km	MPC · JPL
100163	1993 TN_{32}	—	October 9, 1993	La Silla	E. W. Elst	·	2.5 km	MPC · JPL
100164	1993 TV_{38}	—	October 9, 1993	La Silla	E. W. Elst	·	1.9 km	MPC · JPL
100165	1993 TN_{41}	—	October 9, 1993	La Silla	E. W. Elst	PAD	4.9 km	MPC · JPL
100166	1993 UU_{1}	—	October 20, 1993	Kitt Peak	Spacewatch	·	1.6 km	MPC · JPL
100167	1993 UN_{2}	—	October 21, 1993	Kitt Peak	Spacewatch	·	2.1 km	MPC · JPL
100168	1993 UN_{4}	—	October 20, 1993	La Silla	E. W. Elst	·	1.4 km	MPC · JPL
100169	1993 UW_{4}	—	October 20, 1993	La Silla	E. W. Elst	(5)	2.2 km	MPC · JPL
100170	1993 UE_{8}	—	October 20, 1993	La Silla	E. W. Elst	·	5.8 km	MPC · JPL
100171	1993 UJ_{8}	—	October 20, 1993	La Silla	E. W. Elst	V	1.2 km	MPC · JPL
100172	1993 WL	—	November 17, 1993	Kitt Peak	Spacewatch	·	2.1 km	MPC · JPL
100173	1993 XZ	—	December 11, 1993	Oizumi	T. Kobayashi	NYS	2.4 km	MPC · JPL
100174	1994 AJ_{2}	—	January 12, 1994	Stroncone	A. Vagnozzi	NEM	3.8 km	MPC · JPL
100175	1994 AX_{4}	—	January 5, 1994	Kitt Peak	Spacewatch	·	5.7 km	MPC · JPL
100176	1994 AD_{5}	—	January 5, 1994	Kitt Peak	Spacewatch	·	2.9 km	MPC · JPL
100177	1994 AH_{5}	—	January 5, 1994	Kitt Peak	Spacewatch	·	4.7 km	MPC · JPL
100178	1994 AW_{5}	—	January 6, 1994	Kitt Peak	Spacewatch	·	1.2 km	MPC · JPL
100179	1994 AQ_{6}	—	January 7, 1994	Kitt Peak	Spacewatch	·	3.4 km	MPC · JPL
100180	1994 AR_{9}	—	January 8, 1994	Kitt Peak	Spacewatch	·	2.8 km	MPC · JPL
100181	1994 AN_{10}	—	January 8, 1994	Kitt Peak	Spacewatch	·	1.4 km	MPC · JPL
100182	1994 AX_{10}	—	January 8, 1994	Kitt Peak	Spacewatch	·	1.5 km	MPC · JPL
100183	1994 AA_{11}	—	January 8, 1994	Kitt Peak	Spacewatch	·	2.3 km	MPC · JPL
100184	1994 AE_{12}	—	January 11, 1994	Kitt Peak	Spacewatch	·	2.8 km	MPC · JPL
100185	1994 AC_{13}	—	January 11, 1994	Kitt Peak	Spacewatch	·	1.3 km	MPC · JPL
100186	1994 BL_{2}	—	January 19, 1994	Kitt Peak	Spacewatch	NYS	2.2 km	MPC · JPL
100187	1994 BT_{4}	—	January 29, 1994	Stroncone	A. Vagnozzi	·	1.3 km	MPC · JPL
100188	1994 CM_{1}	—	February 9, 1994	Farra d'Isonzo	Farra d'Isonzo	·	4.6 km	MPC · JPL
100189	1994 CK_{3}	—	February 10, 1994	Kitt Peak	Spacewatch	·	3.6 km	MPC · JPL
100190	1994 CE_{4}	—	February 10, 1994	Kitt Peak	Spacewatch	·	3.0 km	MPC · JPL
100191	1994 CX_{5}	—	February 11, 1994	Kitt Peak	Spacewatch	NYS	1.5 km	MPC · JPL
100192	1994 CZ_{5}	—	February 12, 1994	Kitt Peak	Spacewatch	·	1.8 km	MPC · JPL
100193	1994 CC_{7}	—	February 15, 1994	Kitt Peak	Spacewatch	·	1.7 km	MPC · JPL
100194	1994 CK_{11}	—	February 7, 1994	La Silla	E. W. Elst	·	6.0 km	MPC · JPL
100195	1994 CR_{12}	—	February 7, 1994	La Silla	E. W. Elst	·	4.0 km	MPC · JPL
100196	1994 CL_{16}	—	February 8, 1994	La Silla	E. W. Elst	·	7.0 km	MPC · JPL
100197	1994 CQ_{17}	—	February 8, 1994	La Silla	E. W. Elst	·	2.2 km	MPC · JPL
100198	1994 EA_{1}	—	March 9, 1994	Stroncone	A. Vagnozzi	·	2.9 km	MPC · JPL
100199	1994 EF_{4}	—	March 4, 1994	Kitt Peak	Spacewatch	EOS · slow	4.7 km	MPC · JPL
100200	1994 EL_{4}	—	March 5, 1994	Kitt Peak	Spacewatch	·	2.1 km	MPC · JPL

== 100201–100300 ==
back to top

Designation			Discovery			Properties		Ref
Permanent	Provisional	Named after	Date	Site	Discoverer(s)	Category	Diam.	Ref
100201	1994 FD	—	March 19, 1994	Siding Spring	R. H. McNaught	H	850 m	MPC · JPL
100202	1994 GB	—	April 2, 1994	Siding Spring	R. H. McNaught	H	1.1 km	MPC · JPL
100203	1994 GF_{3}	—	April 6, 1994	Kitt Peak	Spacewatch	·	2.0 km	MPC · JPL
100204	1994 GT_{3}	—	April 6, 1994	Kitt Peak	Spacewatch	·	5.5 km	MPC · JPL
100205	1994 GB_{7}	—	April 11, 1994	Kitt Peak	Spacewatch	NYS	2.3 km	MPC · JPL
100206	1994 HW	—	April 16, 1994	Kitt Peak	Spacewatch	·	4.1 km	MPC · JPL
100207	1994 HB_{1}	—	April 19, 1994	Kitt Peak	Spacewatch	·	2.0 km	MPC · JPL
100208	1994 JD_{2}	—	May 1, 1994	Kitt Peak	Spacewatch	·	3.9 km	MPC · JPL
100209	1994 JG_{5}	—	May 4, 1994	Kitt Peak	Spacewatch	NYS	1.9 km	MPC · JPL
100210	1994 LD_{1}	—	June 15, 1994	Siding Spring	G. J. Garradd	·	2.9 km	MPC · JPL
100211	1994 PF_{1}	—	August 7, 1994	Siding Spring	G. J. Garradd	H	1.6 km	MPC · JPL
100212	1994 PV_{3}	—	August 10, 1994	La Silla	E. W. Elst	·	5.0 km	MPC · JPL
100213	1994 PD_{4}	—	August 10, 1994	La Silla	E. W. Elst	THM	3.8 km	MPC · JPL
100214	1994 PJ_{4}	—	August 10, 1994	La Silla	E. W. Elst	·	3.0 km	MPC · JPL
100215	1994 PV_{5}	—	August 10, 1994	La Silla	E. W. Elst	·	3.4 km	MPC · JPL
100216	1994 PQ_{6}	—	August 10, 1994	La Silla	E. W. Elst	·	1.4 km	MPC · JPL
100217	1994 PL_{7}	—	August 10, 1994	La Silla	E. W. Elst	·	5.4 km	MPC · JPL
100218	1994 PV_{7}	—	August 10, 1994	La Silla	E. W. Elst	·	2.0 km	MPC · JPL
100219	1994 PG_{8}	—	August 10, 1994	La Silla	E. W. Elst	·	1.4 km	MPC · JPL
100220	1994 PT_{10}	—	August 10, 1994	La Silla	E. W. Elst	·	4.0 km	MPC · JPL
100221	1994 PP_{12}	—	August 10, 1994	La Silla	E. W. Elst	·	2.3 km	MPC · JPL
100222	1994 PU_{12}	—	August 10, 1994	La Silla	E. W. Elst	(5)	2.0 km	MPC · JPL
100223	1994 PZ_{12}	—	August 10, 1994	La Silla	E. W. Elst	·	5.5 km	MPC · JPL
100224	1994 PO_{13}	—	August 10, 1994	La Silla	E. W. Elst	·	2.1 km	MPC · JPL
100225	1994 PS_{13}	—	August 10, 1994	La Silla	E. W. Elst	·	4.3 km	MPC · JPL
100226	1994 PJ_{16}	—	August 10, 1994	La Silla	E. W. Elst	·	4.1 km	MPC · JPL
100227	1994 PR_{16}	—	August 10, 1994	La Silla	E. W. Elst	(5)	2.4 km	MPC · JPL
100228	1994 PH_{17}	—	August 10, 1994	La Silla	E. W. Elst	NYS	1.9 km	MPC · JPL
100229 Jeanbailly	1994 PB_{18}	Jeanbailly	August 10, 1994	La Silla	E. W. Elst	3:2 · slow	8.9 km	MPC · JPL
100230	1994 PN_{18}	—	August 12, 1994	La Silla	E. W. Elst	THM	4.2 km	MPC · JPL
100231 Monceau	1994 PB_{20}	Monceau	August 12, 1994	La Silla	E. W. Elst	T_{j} (2.98) · 3:2 · SHU	9.2 km	MPC · JPL
100232	1994 PU_{23}	—	August 12, 1994	La Silla	E. W. Elst	(5)	4.8 km	MPC · JPL
100233	1994 PL_{24}	—	August 12, 1994	La Silla	E. W. Elst	EUP	8.0 km	MPC · JPL
100234	1994 PS_{24}	—	August 12, 1994	La Silla	E. W. Elst	·	5.9 km	MPC · JPL
100235	1994 PX_{24}	—	August 12, 1994	La Silla	E. W. Elst	·	1.8 km	MPC · JPL
100236	1994 PS_{27}	—	August 12, 1994	La Silla	E. W. Elst	·	2.3 km	MPC · JPL
100237	1994 PG_{31}	—	August 12, 1994	La Silla	E. W. Elst	·	1.8 km	MPC · JPL
100238	1994 PY_{31}	—	August 12, 1994	La Silla	E. W. Elst	·	2.4 km	MPC · JPL
100239	1994 PE_{32}	—	August 12, 1994	La Silla	E. W. Elst	·	5.2 km	MPC · JPL
100240	1994 PV_{33}	—	August 10, 1994	La Silla	E. W. Elst	·	6.1 km	MPC · JPL
100241	1994 PK_{35}	—	August 10, 1994	La Silla	E. W. Elst	NYS	2.4 km	MPC · JPL
100242	1994 PS_{35}	—	August 10, 1994	La Silla	E. W. Elst	NYS	2.2 km	MPC · JPL
100243	1994 PO_{37}	—	August 10, 1994	La Silla	E. W. Elst	NYS	2.0 km	MPC · JPL
100244	1994 QB	—	August 16, 1994	Siding Spring	G. J. Garradd	·	6.4 km	MPC · JPL
100245	1994 RT_{2}	—	September 2, 1994	Kitt Peak	Spacewatch	·	2.0 km	MPC · JPL
100246	1994 RD_{3}	—	September 2, 1994	Kitt Peak	Spacewatch	V	1.3 km	MPC · JPL
100247	1994 RA_{7}	—	September 12, 1994	Kitt Peak	Spacewatch	·	1.7 km	MPC · JPL
100248	1994 RB_{13}	—	September 3, 1994	La Silla	E. W. Elst	·	1.8 km	MPC · JPL
100249	1994 RW_{13}	—	September 12, 1994	Kitt Peak	Spacewatch	·	5.7 km	MPC · JPL
100250	1994 RN_{15}	—	September 3, 1994	La Silla	E. W. Elst	ERI	2.9 km	MPC · JPL
100251	1994 RC_{17}	—	September 3, 1994	La Silla	E. W. Elst	·	6.4 km	MPC · JPL
100252	1994 RY_{25}	—	September 5, 1994	La Silla	E. W. Elst	EOS ·	3.4 km	MPC · JPL
100253	1994 SB_{2}	—	September 27, 1994	Kitt Peak	Spacewatch	·	3.4 km	MPC · JPL
100254	1994 SG_{4}	—	September 28, 1994	Kitt Peak	Spacewatch	·	2.8 km	MPC · JPL
100255	1994 SJ_{5}	—	September 28, 1994	Kitt Peak	Spacewatch	ADE	3.2 km	MPC · JPL
100256	1994 SU_{5}	—	September 28, 1994	Kitt Peak	Spacewatch	·	3.7 km	MPC · JPL
100257	1994 SF_{9}	—	September 28, 1994	Kitt Peak	Spacewatch	·	2.4 km	MPC · JPL
100258	1994 SW_{10}	—	September 29, 1994	Kitt Peak	Spacewatch	THM	4.6 km	MPC · JPL
100259	1994 TX_{4}	—	October 2, 1994	Kitt Peak	Spacewatch	·	3.8 km	MPC · JPL
100260	1994 TF_{5}	—	October 2, 1994	Kitt Peak	Spacewatch	·	1.9 km	MPC · JPL
100261	1994 TR_{6}	—	October 4, 1994	Kitt Peak	Spacewatch	·	2.6 km	MPC · JPL
100262	1994 TV_{10}	—	October 9, 1994	Kitt Peak	Spacewatch	·	2.8 km	MPC · JPL
100263	1994 TL_{11}	—	October 10, 1994	Kitt Peak	Spacewatch	·	3.7 km	MPC · JPL
100264	1994 TS_{11}	—	October 10, 1994	Kitt Peak	Spacewatch	·	2.1 km	MPC · JPL
100265	1994 TH_{14}	—	October 12, 1994	Kitt Peak	Spacewatch	THM · fast	6.2 km	MPC · JPL
100266 Sadamisaki	1994 TV_{14}	Sadamisaki	October 14, 1994	Kuma Kogen	A. Nakamura	·	4.1 km	MPC · JPL
100267 JAXA	1994 TK_{15}	JAXA	October 14, 1994	Kiso	Sato, I., Abe, M., H. Araki	·	2.2 km	MPC · JPL
100268 Rosenthal	1994 TL_{16}	Rosenthal	October 5, 1994	Tautenburg Observatory	F. Börngen	·	3.0 km	MPC · JPL
100269	1994 UM_{6}	—	October 28, 1994	Kitt Peak	Spacewatch	·	7.2 km	MPC · JPL
100270	1994 VQ	—	November 1, 1994	Oizumi	T. Kobayashi	MAS	1.9 km	MPC · JPL
100271	1994 VP_{1}	—	November 3, 1994	Oizumi	T. Kobayashi	RAF	2.5 km	MPC · JPL
100272	1994 VX_{6}	—	November 1, 1994	Kitami	K. Endate, K. Watanabe	·	5.1 km	MPC · JPL
100273	1994 WO_{1}	—	November 27, 1994	Oizumi	T. Kobayashi	·	3.6 km	MPC · JPL
100274	1994 WU_{5}	—	November 28, 1994	Kitt Peak	Spacewatch	·	1.8 km	MPC · JPL
100275	1994 WW_{12}	—	November 28, 1994	Kitt Peak	Spacewatch	·	4.8 km	MPC · JPL
100276	1994 XV	—	December 6, 1994	Siding Spring	R. H. McNaught	·	2.8 km	MPC · JPL
100277	1994 XB_{5}	—	December 2, 1994	Ondřejov	P. Pravec	·	3.6 km	MPC · JPL
100278	1994 YN	—	December 28, 1994	Oizumi	T. Kobayashi	·	4.0 km	MPC · JPL
100279	1994 YL_{4}	—	December 31, 1994	Kitt Peak	Spacewatch	MAS	1.0 km	MPC · JPL
100280	1995 BQ_{1}	—	January 26, 1995	Oizumi	T. Kobayashi	·	2.2 km	MPC · JPL
100281	1995 BX_{7}	—	January 29, 1995	Kitt Peak	Spacewatch	·	2.7 km	MPC · JPL
100282	1995 BZ_{7}	—	January 29, 1995	Kitt Peak	Spacewatch	·	2.7 km	MPC · JPL
100283	1995 BU_{8}	—	January 29, 1995	Kitt Peak	Spacewatch	·	4.9 km	MPC · JPL
100284	1995 BC_{14}	—	January 31, 1995	Kitt Peak	Spacewatch	·	1.1 km	MPC · JPL
100285	1995 CG_{3}	—	February 1, 1995	Kitt Peak	Spacewatch	·	2.6 km	MPC · JPL
100286	1995 CY_{4}	—	February 1, 1995	Kitt Peak	Spacewatch	·	3.4 km	MPC · JPL
100287	1995 CK_{5}	—	February 1, 1995	Kitt Peak	Spacewatch	·	990 m	MPC · JPL
100288	1995 CZ_{5}	—	February 1, 1995	Kitt Peak	Spacewatch	·	2.1 km	MPC · JPL
100289	1995 CD_{6}	—	February 1, 1995	Kitt Peak	Spacewatch	·	1.7 km	MPC · JPL
100290	1995 CL_{6}	—	February 1, 1995	Kitt Peak	Spacewatch	(5)	1.8 km	MPC · JPL
100291	1995 CM_{8}	—	February 3, 1995	Kitt Peak	Spacewatch	·	2.1 km	MPC · JPL
100292 Harmandir	1995 DP_{2}	Harmandir	February 28, 1995	Colleverde	V. S. Casulli	(5)	2.9 km	MPC · JPL
100293	1995 DY_{7}	—	February 24, 1995	Kitt Peak	Spacewatch	·	3.1 km	MPC · JPL
100294	1995 DM_{9}	—	February 24, 1995	Kitt Peak	Spacewatch	·	4.8 km	MPC · JPL
100295	1995 EC_{5}	—	March 2, 1995	Kitt Peak	Spacewatch	KOR	2.5 km	MPC · JPL
100296	1995 FB	—	March 21, 1995	Stroncone	Santa Lucia	·	3.7 km	MPC · JPL
100297	1995 FU_{2}	—	March 23, 1995	Kitt Peak	Spacewatch	KOR	2.3 km	MPC · JPL
100298	1995 FY_{6}	—	March 23, 1995	Kitt Peak	Spacewatch	·	910 m	MPC · JPL
100299	1995 FR_{7}	—	March 25, 1995	Kitt Peak	Spacewatch	(5)	2.8 km	MPC · JPL
100300	1995 FS_{7}	—	March 25, 1995	Kitt Peak	Spacewatch	·	2.8 km	MPC · JPL

== 100301–100400 ==
back to top

Designation			Discovery			Properties		Ref
Permanent	Provisional	Named after	Date	Site	Discoverer(s)	Category	Diam.	Ref
100301	1995 FH_{12}	—	March 27, 1995	Kitt Peak	Spacewatch	·	3.2 km	MPC · JPL
100302	1995 FQ_{14}	—	March 27, 1995	Kitt Peak	Spacewatch	ADE	2.9 km	MPC · JPL
100303	1995 FD_{15}	—	March 27, 1995	Kitt Peak	Spacewatch	EOS	3.4 km	MPC · JPL
100304	1995 FJ_{20}	—	March 31, 1995	Kitt Peak	Spacewatch	·	850 m	MPC · JPL
100305	1995 GN_{1}	—	April 1, 1995	Kitt Peak	Spacewatch	·	2.0 km	MPC · JPL
100306	1995 GH_{2}	—	April 2, 1995	Kitt Peak	Spacewatch	(5)	2.4 km	MPC · JPL
100307	1995 GJ_{8}	—	April 8, 1995	Kitt Peak	T. J. Balonek	·	3.1 km	MPC · JPL
100308 ČAS	1995 HB	ČAS	April 21, 1995	Ondřejov	P. Pravec, L. Kotková	·	1.8 km	MPC · JPL
100309 Misuzukaneko	1995 HD	Misuzukaneko	April 20, 1995	Kuma Kogen	A. Nakamura	·	2.3 km	MPC · JPL
100310	1995 HK_{3}	—	April 26, 1995	Kitt Peak	Spacewatch	·	2.8 km	MPC · JPL
100311	1995 HZ_{3}	—	April 26, 1995	Kitt Peak	Spacewatch	·	3.1 km	MPC · JPL
100312	1995 LQ	—	June 3, 1995	Kitt Peak	Spacewatch	·	1.9 km	MPC · JPL
100313	1995 LD_{1}	—	June 5, 1995	Xinglong	SCAP	·	1.8 km	MPC · JPL
100314	1995 MK_{1}	—	June 22, 1995	Kitt Peak	Spacewatch	·	3.8 km	MPC · JPL
100315	1995 MZ_{1}	—	June 23, 1995	Kitt Peak	Spacewatch	·	3.1 km	MPC · JPL
100316	1995 MM_{2}	—	June 24, 1995	Kitt Peak	Spacewatch	·	1.6 km	MPC · JPL
100317	1995 MJ_{3}	—	June 25, 1995	Kitt Peak	Spacewatch	·	4.9 km	MPC · JPL
100318	1995 MN_{4}	—	June 29, 1995	Kitt Peak	Spacewatch	·	4.8 km	MPC · JPL
100319	1995 MY_{4}	—	June 22, 1995	Kitt Peak	Spacewatch	V	1.3 km	MPC · JPL
100320	1995 MF_{5}	—	June 22, 1995	Kitt Peak	Spacewatch	·	3.0 km	MPC · JPL
100321	1995 MG_{8}	—	June 29, 1995	Kitt Peak	Spacewatch	V	780 m	MPC · JPL
100322	1995 MJ_{8}	—	June 29, 1995	Kitt Peak	Spacewatch	V	1.2 km	MPC · JPL
100323	1995 OY_{1}	—	July 22, 1995	Church Stretton	S. P. Laurie	·	2.1 km	MPC · JPL
100324	1995 OH_{3}	—	July 22, 1995	Kitt Peak	Spacewatch	·	1.5 km	MPC · JPL
100325	1995 OC_{4}	—	July 22, 1995	Kitt Peak	Spacewatch	·	1.8 km	MPC · JPL
100326	1995 OR_{4}	—	July 22, 1995	Kitt Peak	Spacewatch	KOR	2.5 km	MPC · JPL
100327	1995 QX	—	August 22, 1995	Uto	F. Uto	T_{j} (2.97)	9.8 km	MPC · JPL
100328	1995 QF_{4}	—	August 17, 1995	Kitt Peak	Spacewatch	·	1.5 km	MPC · JPL
100329	1995 QW_{8}	—	August 28, 1995	Kitt Peak	Spacewatch	URS	6.6 km	MPC · JPL
100330	1995 QY_{8}	—	August 28, 1995	Kitt Peak	Spacewatch	·	4.1 km	MPC · JPL
100331	1995 QV_{9}	—	August 23, 1995	Xinglong	SCAP	V	1.1 km	MPC · JPL
100332	1995 QW_{11}	—	August 20, 1995	Kitt Peak	Spacewatch	NYS	1.8 km	MPC · JPL
100333	1995 SN_{5}	—	September 22, 1995	Siding Spring	R. H. McNaught	·	2.1 km	MPC · JPL
100334	1995 SZ_{10}	—	September 17, 1995	Kitt Peak	Spacewatch	NYS	1.4 km	MPC · JPL
100335	1995 SC_{12}	—	September 18, 1995	Kitt Peak	Spacewatch	EOS ·	2.9 km	MPC · JPL
100336	1995 SQ_{18}	—	September 18, 1995	Kitt Peak	Spacewatch	·	1.5 km	MPC · JPL
100337	1995 SY_{36}	—	September 24, 1995	Kitt Peak	Spacewatch	EOS	3.9 km	MPC · JPL
100338	1995 ST_{39}	—	September 25, 1995	Kitt Peak	Spacewatch	·	4.1 km	MPC · JPL
100339	1995 SP_{40}	—	September 25, 1995	Kitt Peak	Spacewatch	·	6.9 km	MPC · JPL
100340	1995 SQ_{41}	—	September 25, 1995	Kitt Peak	Spacewatch	THM	4.7 km	MPC · JPL
100341	1995 ST_{44}	—	September 25, 1995	Kitt Peak	Spacewatch	·	2.1 km	MPC · JPL
100342	1995 SH_{51}	—	September 26, 1995	Kitt Peak	Spacewatch	·	1.3 km	MPC · JPL
100343	1995 SJ_{51}	—	September 26, 1995	Kitt Peak	Spacewatch	NYS	1.2 km	MPC · JPL
100344	1995 SY_{51}	—	September 26, 1995	Kitt Peak	Spacewatch	·	2.4 km	MPC · JPL
100345	1995 ST_{61}	—	September 25, 1995	Kitt Peak	Spacewatch	·	1.4 km	MPC · JPL
100346	1995 SA_{68}	—	September 18, 1995	Kitt Peak	Spacewatch	·	3.2 km	MPC · JPL
100347	1995 SE_{69}	—	September 18, 1995	Kitt Peak	Spacewatch	V	1.2 km	MPC · JPL
100348	1995 SJ_{72}	—	September 20, 1995	Kitt Peak	Spacewatch	·	7.8 km	MPC · JPL
100349	1995 SM_{78}	—	September 30, 1995	Kitt Peak	Spacewatch	·	1.4 km	MPC · JPL
100350	1995 SP_{82}	—	September 24, 1995	Kitt Peak	Spacewatch	THM	3.5 km	MPC · JPL
100351	1995 SU_{88}	—	September 29, 1995	Kitt Peak	Spacewatch	MAS · fast?	920 m	MPC · JPL
100352	1995 TD_{1}	—	October 14, 1995	Stroncone	A. Vagnozzi	·	5.0 km	MPC · JPL
100353	1995 TC_{2}	—	October 14, 1995	Xinglong	SCAP	NYS	1.3 km	MPC · JPL
100354	1995 TR_{4}	—	October 15, 1995	Kitt Peak	Spacewatch	·	1.4 km	MPC · JPL
100355	1995 TO_{6}	—	October 15, 1995	Kitt Peak	Spacewatch	·	2.4 km	MPC · JPL
100356	1995 TC_{7}	—	October 15, 1995	Kitt Peak	Spacewatch	NYS	1.8 km	MPC · JPL
100357	1995 TF_{11}	—	October 15, 1995	Kitt Peak	Spacewatch	·	7.0 km	MPC · JPL
100358	1995 UK_{2}	—	October 24, 1995	Kleť	Kleť	·	5.9 km	MPC · JPL
100359	1995 UK_{8}	—	October 27, 1995	Oizumi	T. Kobayashi	·	1.5 km	MPC · JPL
100360	1995 UE_{12}	—	October 17, 1995	Kitt Peak	Spacewatch	·	1.5 km	MPC · JPL
100361	1995 UC_{14}	—	October 17, 1995	Kitt Peak	Spacewatch	MAS	1.8 km	MPC · JPL
100362	1995 UJ_{14}	—	October 17, 1995	Kitt Peak	Spacewatch	·	2.4 km	MPC · JPL
100363	1995 US_{14}	—	October 17, 1995	Kitt Peak	Spacewatch	NYS	2.0 km	MPC · JPL
100364	1995 UF_{22}	—	October 19, 1995	Kitt Peak	Spacewatch	NYS	2.0 km	MPC · JPL
100365	1995 UE_{32}	—	October 21, 1995	Kitt Peak	Spacewatch	(883)	1.5 km	MPC · JPL
100366	1995 UZ_{39}	—	October 23, 1995	Kitt Peak	Spacewatch	·	1.2 km	MPC · JPL
100367	1995 UY_{40}	—	October 23, 1995	Kitt Peak	Spacewatch	·	2.0 km	MPC · JPL
100368	1995 UG_{41}	—	October 23, 1995	Kitt Peak	Spacewatch	·	1.1 km	MPC · JPL
100369	1995 UX_{45}	—	October 20, 1995	Caussols	E. W. Elst	·	1.4 km	MPC · JPL
100370	1995 UJ_{51}	—	October 20, 1995	Kitt Peak	Spacewatch	·	3.5 km	MPC · JPL
100371	1995 UO_{52}	—	October 22, 1995	Kitt Peak	Spacewatch	·	1.8 km	MPC · JPL
100372	1995 UR_{54}	—	October 17, 1995	Kitt Peak	Spacewatch	NYS ·	2.0 km	MPC · JPL
100373	1995 UV_{69}	—	October 19, 1995	Kitt Peak	Spacewatch	·	1.3 km	MPC · JPL
100374	1995 UX_{69}	—	October 19, 1995	Kitt Peak	Spacewatch	·	3.7 km	MPC · JPL
100375	1995 UY_{72}	—	October 20, 1995	Kitt Peak	Spacewatch	·	1.8 km	MPC · JPL
100376	1995 UT_{73}	—	October 20, 1995	Kitt Peak	Spacewatch	·	2.3 km	MPC · JPL
100377	1995 VH	—	November 1, 1995	Oizumi	T. Kobayashi	·	6.1 km	MPC · JPL
100378	1995 VD_{6}	—	November 14, 1995	Kitt Peak	Spacewatch	·	2.2 km	MPC · JPL
100379	1995 VZ_{6}	—	November 14, 1995	Kitt Peak	Spacewatch	·	2.5 km	MPC · JPL
100380	1995 VS_{10}	—	November 15, 1995	Kitt Peak	Spacewatch	MRX	2.3 km	MPC · JPL
100381	1995 VB_{13}	—	November 15, 1995	Kitt Peak	Spacewatch	·	6.0 km	MPC · JPL
100382	1995 VF_{13}	—	November 15, 1995	Kitt Peak	Spacewatch	NYS	1.4 km	MPC · JPL
100383	1995 VD_{15}	—	November 15, 1995	Kitt Peak	Spacewatch	·	1.2 km	MPC · JPL
100384	1995 VH_{15}	—	November 15, 1995	Kitt Peak	Spacewatch	MAS	1.2 km	MPC · JPL
100385	1995 VP_{15}	—	November 15, 1995	Kitt Peak	Spacewatch	NYS	2.0 km	MPC · JPL
100386	1995 WZ_{2}	—	November 20, 1995	Farra d'Isonzo	Farra d'Isonzo	·	1.7 km	MPC · JPL
100387	1995 WJ_{4}	—	November 20, 1995	Oizumi	T. Kobayashi	·	6.0 km	MPC · JPL
100388	1995 WW_{7}	—	November 28, 1995	Oizumi	T. Kobayashi	·	4.8 km	MPC · JPL
100389	1995 WU_{8}	—	November 24, 1995	Chichibu	N. Satō, T. Urata	·	1.5 km	MPC · JPL
100390	1995 WK_{13}	—	November 16, 1995	Kitt Peak	Spacewatch	(2076)	1.7 km	MPC · JPL
100391	1995 WO_{17}	—	November 17, 1995	Kitt Peak	Spacewatch	NYS	2.0 km	MPC · JPL
100392	1995 WR_{17}	—	November 17, 1995	Kitt Peak	Spacewatch	·	1.3 km	MPC · JPL
100393	1995 WZ_{30}	—	November 19, 1995	Kitt Peak	Spacewatch	·	2.3 km	MPC · JPL
100394	1995 WX_{32}	—	November 20, 1995	Kitt Peak	Spacewatch	·	2.9 km	MPC · JPL
100395	1995 WG_{38}	—	November 23, 1995	Kitt Peak	Spacewatch	·	1.8 km	MPC · JPL
100396	1995 YH_{5}	—	December 16, 1995	Kitt Peak	Spacewatch	·	2.4 km	MPC · JPL
100397	1995 YK_{5}	—	December 16, 1995	Kitt Peak	Spacewatch	·	5.2 km	MPC · JPL
100398	1995 YA_{7}	—	December 16, 1995	Kitt Peak	Spacewatch	NYS	1.6 km	MPC · JPL
100399	1995 YM_{7}	—	December 16, 1995	Kitt Peak	Spacewatch	·	3.1 km	MPC · JPL
100400	1995 YX_{7}	—	December 18, 1995	Kitt Peak	Spacewatch	·	2.1 km	MPC · JPL

== 100401–100500 ==
back to top

Designation			Discovery			Properties		Ref
Permanent	Provisional	Named after	Date	Site	Discoverer(s)	Category	Diam.	Ref
100401	1995 YS_{17}	—	December 22, 1995	Kitt Peak	Spacewatch	·	2.9 km	MPC · JPL
100402	1995 YP_{20}	—	December 25, 1995	Kitt Peak	Spacewatch	·	2.1 km	MPC · JPL
100403	1996 AD	—	January 1, 1996	Oizumi	T. Kobayashi	PHO	2.6 km	MPC · JPL
100404	1996 AC_{1}	—	January 12, 1996	Oizumi	T. Kobayashi	H	1.3 km	MPC · JPL
100405	1996 AG_{5}	—	January 12, 1996	Kitt Peak	Spacewatch	·	1.9 km	MPC · JPL
100406	1996 AU_{5}	—	January 12, 1996	Kitt Peak	Spacewatch	HYG	5.8 km	MPC · JPL
100407	1996 AH_{6}	—	January 12, 1996	Kitt Peak	Spacewatch	·	1.9 km	MPC · JPL
100408	1996 AV_{6}	—	January 12, 1996	Kitt Peak	Spacewatch	·	4.6 km	MPC · JPL
100409	1996 AX_{8}	—	January 13, 1996	Kitt Peak	Spacewatch	·	2.8 km	MPC · JPL
100410	1996 AZ_{10}	—	January 13, 1996	Kitt Peak	Spacewatch	·	2.0 km	MPC · JPL
100411	1996 AF_{11}	—	January 13, 1996	Kitt Peak	Spacewatch	·	1.9 km	MPC · JPL
100412	1996 AT_{11}	—	January 14, 1996	Kitt Peak	Spacewatch	V	1.1 km	MPC · JPL
100413	1996 AF_{18}	—	January 13, 1996	Kitt Peak	Spacewatch	·	3.7 km	MPC · JPL
100414	1996 AJ_{18}	—	January 13, 1996	Kitt Peak	Spacewatch	·	3.6 km	MPC · JPL
100415	1996 BO_{14}	—	January 16, 1996	Kitt Peak	Spacewatch	·	2.5 km	MPC · JPL
100416 Syang	1996 CB	Syang	February 2, 1996	NRC-DAO	D. D. Balam	H	1.4 km	MPC · JPL
100417 Philipglass	1996 EC	Philipglass	March 7, 1996	Linz	E. Meyer	(5)	2.5 km	MPC · JPL
100418	1996 EF_{9}	—	March 12, 1996	Kitt Peak	Spacewatch	(5)	1.8 km	MPC · JPL
100419	1996 EP_{10}	—	March 12, 1996	Kitt Peak	Spacewatch	·	2.5 km	MPC · JPL
100420	1996 EA_{11}	—	March 12, 1996	Kitt Peak	Spacewatch	AST	4.2 km	MPC · JPL
100421	1996 FF_{4}	—	March 23, 1996	Haleakala	AMOS	·	5.1 km	MPC · JPL
100422	1996 GP_{7}	—	April 12, 1996	Kitt Peak	Spacewatch	HOF	5.4 km	MPC · JPL
100423	1996 GG_{14}	—	April 12, 1996	Kitt Peak	Spacewatch	·	2.2 km	MPC · JPL
100424	1996 GS_{18}	—	April 15, 1996	La Silla	E. W. Elst	·	5.8 km	MPC · JPL
100425	1996 HM	—	April 17, 1996	Haleakala	AMOS	·	1.9 km	MPC · JPL
100426	1996 HB_{7}	—	April 18, 1996	Kitt Peak	Spacewatch	·	2.3 km	MPC · JPL
100427	1996 HQ_{10}	—	April 17, 1996	La Silla	E. W. Elst	·	4.1 km	MPC · JPL
100428	1996 HT_{11}	—	April 17, 1996	La Silla	E. W. Elst	·	4.9 km	MPC · JPL
100429	1996 HB_{15}	—	April 17, 1996	La Silla	E. W. Elst	·	4.7 km	MPC · JPL
100430	1996 HK_{18}	—	April 18, 1996	La Silla	E. W. Elst	·	3.2 km	MPC · JPL
100431	1996 HU_{20}	—	April 18, 1996	La Silla	E. W. Elst	·	5.2 km	MPC · JPL
100432	1996 HX_{23}	—	April 20, 1996	La Silla	E. W. Elst	·	2.0 km	MPC · JPL
100433 Hyakusyuko	1996 KU_{1}	Hyakusyuko	May 24, 1996	Nanyo	T. Okuni	·	2.6 km	MPC · JPL
100434 Jinyilian	1996 LJ	Jinyilian	June 6, 1996	Xinglong	SCAP	·	3.2 km	MPC · JPL
100435	1996 LK_{2}	—	June 8, 1996	Kitt Peak	Spacewatch	·	2.1 km	MPC · JPL
100436	1996 NN_{1}	—	July 15, 1996	Haleakala	NEAT	PHO	2.0 km	MPC · JPL
100437	1996 OY	—	July 22, 1996	Kleť	Kleť	·	2.8 km	MPC · JPL
100438	1996 PC_{3}	—	August 14, 1996	Haleakala	NEAT	·	5.7 km	MPC · JPL
100439	1996 PU_{5}	—	August 10, 1996	Haleakala	NEAT	·	3.1 km	MPC · JPL
100440	1996 PJ_{6}	—	August 14, 1996	Haleakala	NEAT	NYS	2.0 km	MPC · JPL
100441	1996 PZ_{7}	—	August 8, 1996	La Silla	E. W. Elst	·	1.9 km	MPC · JPL
100442	1996 QV	—	August 20, 1996	Farra d'Isonzo	Farra d'Isonzo	NYS	1.8 km	MPC · JPL
100443	1996 RS	—	September 9, 1996	Haleakala	NEAT	·	4.0 km	MPC · JPL
100444	1996 RK_{1}	—	September 9, 1996	Prescott	P. G. Comba	·	3.6 km	MPC · JPL
100445 Pisa	1996 RA_{4}	Pisa	September 12, 1996	Colleverde	V. S. Casulli	·	1.4 km	MPC · JPL
100446	1996 RC_{4}	—	September 15, 1996	Haleakala	NEAT	·	910 m	MPC · JPL
100447	1996 RB_{5}	—	September 14, 1996	Church Stretton	S. P. Laurie	·	1.4 km	MPC · JPL
100448	1996 RE_{5}	—	September 13, 1996	Haleakala	NEAT	·	2.5 km	MPC · JPL
100449	1996 RJ_{9}	—	September 7, 1996	Kitt Peak	Spacewatch	·	6.0 km	MPC · JPL
100450	1996 RN_{11}	—	September 8, 1996	Kitt Peak	Spacewatch	·	3.1 km	MPC · JPL
100451	1996 RR_{15}	—	September 13, 1996	Kitt Peak	Spacewatch	·	3.1 km	MPC · JPL
100452	1996 RY_{27}	—	September 10, 1996	La Silla	Uppsala-DLR Trojan Survey	·	1.0 km	MPC · JPL
100453	1996 SA_{4}	—	September 18, 1996	Xinglong	SCAP	·	1.5 km	MPC · JPL
100454	1996 SA_{6}	—	September 18, 1996	Xinglong	SCAP	·	2.1 km	MPC · JPL
100455	1996 SB_{6}	—	September 18, 1996	Xinglong	SCAP	(5)	2.7 km	MPC · JPL
100456 Chichén Itzá	1996 TH	Chichén Itzá	October 2, 1996	Colleverde	V. S. Casulli	·	3.4 km	MPC · JPL
100457	1996 TJ_{3}	—	October 7, 1996	Prescott	P. G. Comba	·	5.3 km	MPC · JPL
100458	1996 TP_{3}	—	October 4, 1996	Church Stretton	S. P. Laurie	PHO	2.2 km	MPC · JPL
100459	1996 TB_{5}	—	October 6, 1996	Rand	G. R. Viscome	·	5.9 km	MPC · JPL
100460	1996 TN_{7}	—	October 8, 1996	Haleakala	NEAT	·	1.7 km	MPC · JPL
100461	1996 TP_{7}	—	October 9, 1996	Haleakala	NEAT	slow	6.9 km	MPC · JPL
100462	1996 TV_{9}	—	October 15, 1996	Kleť	Kleť	·	1.5 km	MPC · JPL
100463	1996 TU_{14}	—	October 9, 1996	Nanyo	T. Okuni	·	4.3 km	MPC · JPL
100464	1996 TE_{15}	—	October 3, 1996	Xinglong	SCAP	·	5.8 km	MPC · JPL
100465	1996 TM_{16}	—	October 4, 1996	Kitt Peak	Spacewatch	·	3.6 km	MPC · JPL
100466	1996 TD_{18}	—	October 4, 1996	Kitt Peak	Spacewatch	·	5.1 km	MPC · JPL
100467	1996 TD_{19}	—	October 4, 1996	Kitt Peak	Spacewatch	·	1.3 km	MPC · JPL
100468	1996 TO_{23}	—	October 6, 1996	Kitt Peak	Spacewatch	·	1.4 km	MPC · JPL
100469	1996 TO_{28}	—	October 7, 1996	Kitt Peak	Spacewatch	DOR	7.2 km	MPC · JPL
100470	1996 TY_{28}	—	October 7, 1996	Kitt Peak	Spacewatch	·	1.5 km	MPC · JPL
100471	1996 TK_{29}	—	October 7, 1996	Kitt Peak	Spacewatch	MAS	1.3 km	MPC · JPL
100472	1996 TA_{34}	—	October 10, 1996	Kitt Peak	Spacewatch	·	3.6 km	MPC · JPL
100473	1996 TO_{34}	—	October 10, 1996	Kitt Peak	Spacewatch	NYS	1.6 km	MPC · JPL
100474	1996 TB_{35}	—	October 11, 1996	Kitt Peak	Spacewatch	·	3.4 km	MPC · JPL
100475	1996 TZ_{36}	—	October 12, 1996	Kitt Peak	Spacewatch	L4	16 km	MPC · JPL
100476	1996 TK_{37}	—	October 12, 1996	Kitt Peak	Spacewatch	·	6.3 km	MPC · JPL
100477	1996 TM_{39}	—	October 8, 1996	La Silla	E. W. Elst	·	1.3 km	MPC · JPL
100478	1996 TW_{59}	—	October 3, 1996	La Silla	E. W. Elst	·	7.5 km	MPC · JPL
100479	1996 TT_{60}	—	October 3, 1996	La Silla	E. W. Elst	·	6.1 km	MPC · JPL
100480	1996 UK	—	October 16, 1996	Nachi-Katsuura	Y. Shimizu, T. Urata	·	2.6 km	MPC · JPL
100481	1996 UJ_{1}	—	October 20, 1996	Oizumi	T. Kobayashi	·	1.9 km	MPC · JPL
100482	1996 UT_{2}	—	October 18, 1996	Kitt Peak	Spacewatch	·	4.6 km	MPC · JPL
100483 NAOJ	1996 US_{3}	NAOJ	October 30, 1996	Tokyo-Mitaka	Sato, I., Fukushima, H., Yamamoto, N.	·	4.2 km	MPC · JPL
100484	1996 UL_{4}	—	October 29, 1996	Xinglong	SCAP	EOS	4.7 km	MPC · JPL
100485 Russelldavies	1996 VX	Russelldavies	November 3, 1996	Linz	E. Meyer, E. Obermair	·	2.5 km	MPC · JPL
100486	1996 VH_{1}	—	November 7, 1996	Prescott	P. G. Comba	·	7.1 km	MPC · JPL
100487	1996 VO_{2}	—	November 10, 1996	Sudbury	D. di Cicco	·	1.5 km	MPC · JPL
100488	1996 VS_{11}	—	November 4, 1996	Kitt Peak	Spacewatch	·	3.6 km	MPC · JPL
100489	1996 VW_{13}	—	November 5, 1996	Kitt Peak	Spacewatch	NYS · fast	1.6 km	MPC · JPL
100490	1996 VB_{14}	—	November 5, 1996	Kitt Peak	Spacewatch	·	2.6 km	MPC · JPL
100491	1996 VE_{31}	—	November 3, 1996	Kitt Peak	Spacewatch	·	970 m	MPC · JPL
100492	1996 VC_{34}	—	November 7, 1996	Kitt Peak	Spacewatch	·	1.4 km	MPC · JPL
100493	1996 VK_{37}	—	November 11, 1996	Kitt Peak	Spacewatch	fast	1.1 km	MPC · JPL
100494	1996 VF_{39}	—	November 9, 1996	Xinglong	SCAP	·	6.0 km	MPC · JPL
100495	1996 WH	—	November 17, 1996	Sudbury	D. di Cicco	·	7.1 km	MPC · JPL
100496	1996 WJ	—	November 17, 1996	Sudbury	D. di Cicco	·	2.8 km	MPC · JPL
100497	1996 XB	—	December 1, 1996	Prescott	P. G. Comba	·	4.7 km	MPC · JPL
100498	1996 XK	—	December 1, 1996	Kitt Peak	Spacewatch	·	1.9 km	MPC · JPL
100499	1996 XP	—	December 1, 1996	Chichibu	N. Satō	MAS	1.4 km	MPC · JPL
100500	1996 XZ_{16}	—	December 4, 1996	Kitt Peak	Spacewatch	NYS	1.6 km	MPC · JPL

== 100501–100600 ==
back to top

Designation			Discovery			Properties		Ref
Permanent	Provisional	Named after	Date	Site	Discoverer(s)	Category	Diam.	Ref
100501	1996 XA_{19}	—	December 8, 1996	Bisei SG Center	BATTeRS	·	2.3 km	MPC · JPL
100502	1996 XZ_{22}	—	December 12, 1996	Kitt Peak	Spacewatch	·	1.3 km	MPC · JPL
100503	1996 XD_{25}	—	December 9, 1996	Kitt Peak	Spacewatch	NYS	2.2 km	MPC · JPL
100504	1997 AU_{8}	—	January 2, 1997	Kitt Peak	Spacewatch	MAS	1.1 km	MPC · JPL
100505	1997 AA_{9}	—	January 2, 1997	Kitt Peak	Spacewatch	·	6.5 km	MPC · JPL
100506	1997 AG_{9}	—	January 2, 1997	Kitt Peak	Spacewatch	·	3.2 km	MPC · JPL
100507	1997 AG_{12}	—	January 10, 1997	Kitt Peak	Spacewatch	NYS	1.7 km	MPC · JPL
100508	1997 AY_{14}	—	January 13, 1997	Kleť	Kleť	·	7.8 km	MPC · JPL
100509	1997 AH_{15}	—	January 11, 1997	Haleakala	NEAT	PHO	2.5 km	MPC · JPL
100510	1997 AO_{18}	—	January 15, 1997	Farra d'Isonzo	Farra d'Isonzo	·	1.5 km	MPC · JPL
100511	1997 AY_{18}	—	January 10, 1997	Kitt Peak	Spacewatch	EOS	3.4 km	MPC · JPL
100512	1997 AN_{20}	—	January 11, 1997	Kitt Peak	Spacewatch	·	3.2 km	MPC · JPL
100513	1997 AL_{21}	—	January 10, 1997	Uenohara	N. Kawasato	V	1.5 km	MPC · JPL
100514	1997 AB_{24}	—	January 15, 1997	Campo Imperatore	A. Boattini, A. Di Paola	NYS	1.8 km	MPC · JPL
100515	1997 AM_{24}	—	January 15, 1997	Campo Imperatore	A. Boattini, A. Di Paola	·	4.4 km	MPC · JPL
100516	1997 BA	—	January 16, 1997	Oizumi	T. Kobayashi	·	4.9 km	MPC · JPL
100517	1997 BD	—	January 16, 1997	Kleť	Kleť	·	4.4 km	MPC · JPL
100518	1997 BL	—	January 16, 1997	Oizumi	T. Kobayashi	(5)	3.1 km	MPC · JPL
100519 Bombig	1997 BE_{2}	Bombig	January 28, 1997	Farra d'Isonzo	Farra d'Isonzo	·	1.7 km	MPC · JPL
100520	1997 BU_{2}	—	January 30, 1997	Oizumi	T. Kobayashi	·	2.4 km	MPC · JPL
100521	1997 BX_{5}	—	January 26, 1997	Modra	A. Galád, Pravda, A.	·	5.6 km	MPC · JPL
100522	1997 CA	—	February 1, 1997	Ondřejov	L. Kotková	·	6.3 km	MPC · JPL
100523	1997 CT_{2}	—	February 2, 1997	Kitt Peak	Spacewatch	·	1.6 km	MPC · JPL
100524	1997 CV_{5}	—	February 6, 1997	Kleť	Kleť	·	3.3 km	MPC · JPL
100525	1997 CX_{8}	—	February 1, 1997	Kitt Peak	Spacewatch	·	7.3 km	MPC · JPL
100526	1997 CK_{9}	—	February 1, 1997	Kitt Peak	Spacewatch	·	2.7 km	MPC · JPL
100527	1997 CB_{10}	—	February 2, 1997	Kitt Peak	Spacewatch	MAS	1.1 km	MPC · JPL
100528	1997 CZ_{10}	—	February 3, 1997	Kitt Peak	Spacewatch	·	4.0 km	MPC · JPL
100529	1997 CA_{11}	—	February 3, 1997	Kitt Peak	Spacewatch	·	2.2 km	MPC · JPL
100530	1997 CE_{12}	—	February 3, 1997	Kitt Peak	Spacewatch	·	3.4 km	MPC · JPL
100531	1997 CP_{12}	—	February 3, 1997	Kitt Peak	Spacewatch	MAS	1.2 km	MPC · JPL
100532	1997 CB_{17}	—	February 6, 1997	Oizumi	T. Kobayashi	·	2.6 km	MPC · JPL
100533	1997 CH_{17}	—	February 1, 1997	Kitt Peak	Spacewatch	·	1.4 km	MPC · JPL
100534	1997 CM_{22}	—	February 3, 1997	Kitt Peak	Spacewatch	·	3.2 km	MPC · JPL
100535	1997 CR_{22}	—	February 3, 1997	Kitt Peak	Spacewatch	·	2.4 km	MPC · JPL
100536	1997 CD_{28}	—	February 6, 1997	Xinglong	SCAP	(5)	2.8 km	MPC · JPL
100537	1997 EL_{4}	—	March 2, 1997	Kitt Peak	Spacewatch	THM	4.5 km	MPC · JPL
100538	1997 ET_{10}	—	March 7, 1997	Kitt Peak	Spacewatch	·	4.2 km	MPC · JPL
100539	1997 EN_{13}	—	March 3, 1997	Kitt Peak	Spacewatch	·	3.1 km	MPC · JPL
100540	1997 EK_{20}	—	March 4, 1997	Kitt Peak	Spacewatch	·	1.7 km	MPC · JPL
100541	1997 EG_{25}	—	March 7, 1997	Kitt Peak	Spacewatch	V	1.4 km	MPC · JPL
100542	1997 ES_{25}	—	March 9, 1997	Oohira	T. Urata	·	2.6 km	MPC · JPL
100543	1997 ES_{26}	—	March 4, 1997	Kitt Peak	Spacewatch	THM	3.7 km	MPC · JPL
100544	1997 ET_{28}	—	March 10, 1997	Kitt Peak	Spacewatch	·	1.6 km	MPC · JPL
100545	1997 ED_{30}	—	March 9, 1997	Kitt Peak	Spacewatch	JUN	2.5 km	MPC · JPL
100546	1997 EU_{32}	—	March 13, 1997	Bédoin	P. Antonini	·	1.8 km	MPC · JPL
100547	1997 EQ_{35}	—	March 4, 1997	Socorro	LINEAR	·	3.1 km	MPC · JPL
100548	1997 EA_{36}	—	March 4, 1997	Socorro	LINEAR	·	3.0 km	MPC · JPL
100549	1997 EK_{38}	—	March 5, 1997	Socorro	LINEAR	·	5.3 km	MPC · JPL
100550	1997 EM_{41}	—	March 10, 1997	Socorro	LINEAR	·	4.3 km	MPC · JPL
100551	1997 EM_{42}	—	March 10, 1997	Socorro	LINEAR	·	4.6 km	MPC · JPL
100552	1997 FK_{2}	—	March 31, 1997	Socorro	LINEAR	·	4.6 km	MPC · JPL
100553 Dariofo	1997 GD	Dariofo	April 2, 1997	Pianoro	V. Goretti	·	1.2 km	MPC · JPL
100554	1997 GJ	—	April 4, 1997	Haleakala	NEAT	·	2.2 km	MPC · JPL
100555	1997 GY_{1}	—	April 7, 1997	Kitt Peak	Spacewatch	·	3.5 km	MPC · JPL
100556	1997 GS_{2}	—	April 7, 1997	Kitt Peak	Spacewatch	·	3.5 km	MPC · JPL
100557	1997 GW_{3}	—	April 3, 1997	Kitami	K. Endate, K. Watanabe	·	2.4 km	MPC · JPL
100558	1997 GE_{9}	—	April 3, 1997	Socorro	LINEAR	·	3.4 km	MPC · JPL
100559	1997 GO_{9}	—	April 3, 1997	Socorro	LINEAR	·	2.3 km	MPC · JPL
100560	1997 GA_{12}	—	April 3, 1997	Socorro	LINEAR	·	2.4 km	MPC · JPL
100561	1997 GN_{18}	—	April 3, 1997	Socorro	LINEAR	·	2.9 km	MPC · JPL
100562	1997 GW_{19}	—	April 5, 1997	Socorro	LINEAR	·	1.8 km	MPC · JPL
100563	1997 GW_{26}	—	April 7, 1997	Kitt Peak	Spacewatch	·	1.7 km	MPC · JPL
100564	1997 GU_{27}	—	April 9, 1997	Prescott	P. G. Comba	·	6.1 km	MPC · JPL
100565	1997 GC_{29}	—	April 9, 1997	Kitt Peak	Spacewatch	·	1.7 km	MPC · JPL
100566	1997 GF_{33}	—	April 3, 1997	Socorro	LINEAR	·	2.4 km	MPC · JPL
100567	1997 GM_{36}	—	April 6, 1997	Socorro	LINEAR	·	2.1 km	MPC · JPL
100568	1997 GV_{37}	—	April 5, 1997	Haleakala	NEAT	·	1.7 km	MPC · JPL
100569	1997 HR	—	April 28, 1997	Kitt Peak	Spacewatch	·	2.2 km	MPC · JPL
100570	1997 HU_{1}	—	April 28, 1997	Kitt Peak	Spacewatch	·	2.0 km	MPC · JPL
100571	1997 HH_{2}	—	April 29, 1997	Kitt Peak	Spacewatch	NYS	1.7 km	MPC · JPL
100572	1997 HJ_{2}	—	April 29, 1997	Kitt Peak	Spacewatch	·	2.8 km	MPC · JPL
100573	1997 HR_{2}	—	April 29, 1997	Kitt Peak	Spacewatch	·	1.8 km	MPC · JPL
100574	1997 HS_{2}	—	April 30, 1997	Kitt Peak	Spacewatch	NYS	2.1 km	MPC · JPL
100575	1997 HD_{3}	—	April 30, 1997	Kitt Peak	Spacewatch	·	890 m	MPC · JPL
100576	1997 HJ_{10}	—	April 30, 1997	Socorro	LINEAR	·	1.6 km	MPC · JPL
100577	1997 HM_{10}	—	April 30, 1997	Socorro	LINEAR	·	2.0 km	MPC · JPL
100578	1997 HY_{10}	—	April 30, 1997	Socorro	LINEAR	·	3.0 km	MPC · JPL
100579	1997 HS_{11}	—	April 30, 1997	Socorro	LINEAR	EUN	1.9 km	MPC · JPL
100580	1997 HM_{16}	—	April 30, 1997	Kitt Peak	Spacewatch	MAS	1.1 km	MPC · JPL
100581	1997 HA_{17}	—	April 29, 1997	Kitt Peak	Spacewatch	·	2.8 km	MPC · JPL
100582	1997 HC_{17}	—	April 30, 1997	Kitt Peak	Spacewatch	(5)	2.1 km	MPC · JPL
100583	1997 JY_{9}	—	May 10, 1997	Mauna Kea	Veillet, C.	·	3.5 km	MPC · JPL
100584	1997 JJ_{14}	—	May 1, 1997	Socorro	LINEAR	NYS	2.2 km	MPC · JPL
100585	1997 LN_{9}	—	June 7, 1997	La Silla	E. W. Elst	·	2.2 km	MPC · JPL
100586	1997 LP_{15}	—	June 8, 1997	La Silla	E. W. Elst	NYS	2.3 km	MPC · JPL
100587	1997 MH	—	June 26, 1997	Kitt Peak	Spacewatch	V	1.3 km	MPC · JPL
100588	1997 MV_{3}	—	June 28, 1997	Socorro	LINEAR	(5)	2.4 km	MPC · JPL
100589	1997 MV_{8}	—	June 29, 1997	Kitt Peak	Spacewatch	·	2.3 km	MPC · JPL
100590	1997 NP_{1}	—	July 2, 1997	Kitt Peak	Spacewatch	PAL	4.4 km	MPC · JPL
100591	1997 NW_{2}	—	July 2, 1997	Kitt Peak	Spacewatch	·	4.4 km	MPC · JPL
100592	1997 NN_{5}	—	July 5, 1997	Kitt Peak	Spacewatch	·	3.6 km	MPC · JPL
100593	1997 OH_{1}	—	July 28, 1997	Kitt Peak	Spacewatch	·	2.6 km	MPC · JPL
100594	1997 OH_{2}	—	July 30, 1997	Caussols	ODAS	NYS	2.1 km	MPC · JPL
100595	1997 PA_{2}	—	August 4, 1997	Modra	A. Galád, Pravda, A.	KOR	2.4 km	MPC · JPL
100596 Perrett	1997 PN_{2}	Perrett	August 9, 1997	NRC-DAO	D. D. Balam	·	3.9 km	MPC · JPL
100597	1997 PY_{4}	—	August 11, 1997	Xinglong	SCAP	EUN	1.7 km	MPC · JPL
100598	1997 QO_{1}	—	August 31, 1997	Cloudcroft	W. Offutt	H	1.4 km	MPC · JPL
100599	1997 QV_{4}	—	August 31, 1997	Bergisch Gladbach	W. Bickel	·	1.2 km	MPC · JPL
100600 Davidfossé	1997 RX_{1}	Davidfossé	September 4, 1997	Caussols	ODAS	·	5.3 km	MPC · JPL

== 100601–100700 ==
back to top

Designation			Discovery			Properties		Ref
Permanent	Provisional	Named after	Date	Site	Discoverer(s)	Category	Diam.	Ref
100601	1997 RF_{4}	—	September 4, 1997	Caussols	ODAS	·	3.9 km	MPC · JPL
100602	1997 RD_{9}	—	September 10, 1997	Bergisch Gladbach	W. Bickel	·	3.7 km	MPC · JPL
100603	1997 RN_{9}	—	September 15, 1997	Modra	A. Galád, Pravda, A.	·	2.4 km	MPC · JPL
100604 Lundy	1997 RY_{9}	Lundy	September 11, 1997	Uccle	T. Pauwels	·	2.5 km	MPC · JPL
100605	1997 SR_{1}	—	September 23, 1997	Farra d'Isonzo	Farra d'Isonzo	·	1.9 km	MPC · JPL
100606	1997 SU_{2}	—	September 25, 1997	Ondřejov	P. Pravec	EUN	3.3 km	MPC · JPL
100607	1997 SB_{4}	—	September 26, 1997	Ondřejov	P. Pravec	·	2.3 km	MPC · JPL
100608	1997 SQ_{6}	—	September 23, 1997	Kitt Peak	Spacewatch	·	2.2 km	MPC · JPL
100609	1997 ST_{6}	—	September 23, 1997	Kitt Peak	Spacewatch	EOS	3.3 km	MPC · JPL
100610	1997 ST_{18}	—	September 28, 1997	Kitt Peak	Spacewatch	·	3.0 km	MPC · JPL
100611	1997 SR_{19}	—	September 28, 1997	Kitt Peak	Spacewatch	·	2.8 km	MPC · JPL
100612	1997 SL_{25}	—	September 29, 1997	Nachi-Katsuura	Y. Shimizu, T. Urata	EUN	2.8 km	MPC · JPL
100613	1997 SM_{31}	—	September 28, 1997	Kitt Peak	Spacewatch	·	1.4 km	MPC · JPL
100614	1997 SX_{34}	—	September 28, 1997	Haleakala	NEAT	·	2.6 km	MPC · JPL
100615	1997 TX_{1}	—	October 3, 1997	Caussols	ODAS	·	2.2 km	MPC · JPL
100616	1997 TN_{2}	—	October 3, 1997	Caussols	ODAS	EUN	1.7 km	MPC · JPL
100617	1997 TQ_{2}	—	October 3, 1997	Caussols	ODAS	HYG	5.8 km	MPC · JPL
100618	1997 TJ_{11}	—	October 3, 1997	Kitt Peak	Spacewatch	·	3.9 km	MPC · JPL
100619	1997 TK_{14}	—	October 4, 1997	Kitt Peak	Spacewatch	L4	20 km	MPC · JPL
100620	1997 TM_{20}	—	October 3, 1997	Kitt Peak	Spacewatch	·	5.6 km	MPC · JPL
100621	1997 TX_{23}	—	October 11, 1997	Kitt Peak	Spacewatch	·	4.6 km	MPC · JPL
100622	1997 TK_{26}	—	October 13, 1997	Xinglong	SCAP	·	2.0 km	MPC · JPL
100623	1997 TP_{27}	—	October 3, 1997	Kitt Peak	Spacewatch	HYG	5.6 km	MPC · JPL
100624	1997 TR_{28}	—	October 6, 1997	La Silla	Uppsala-DLR Trojan Survey	L4 · moon	20 km	MPC · JPL
100625	1997 UZ	—	October 22, 1997	Kleť	Kleť	AGN	2.6 km	MPC · JPL
100626	1997 UE_{2}	—	October 21, 1997	Nachi-Katsuura	Y. Shimizu, T. Urata	·	4.2 km	MPC · JPL
100627	1997 UD_{3}	—	October 19, 1997	Farra d'Isonzo	Farra d'Isonzo	·	3.9 km	MPC · JPL
100628	1997 UX_{3}	—	October 26, 1997	Oizumi	T. Kobayashi	·	1.6 km	MPC · JPL
100629	1997 UL_{5}	—	October 21, 1997	Kitt Peak	Spacewatch	·	2.7 km	MPC · JPL
100630	1997 UQ_{7}	—	October 22, 1997	Ondřejov	P. Pravec	·	1.5 km	MPC · JPL
100631	1997 UH_{8}	—	October 29, 1997	Prescott	P. G. Comba	·	3.3 km	MPC · JPL
100632	1997 UZ_{12}	—	October 23, 1997	Kitt Peak	Spacewatch	·	2.6 km	MPC · JPL
100633	1997 UX_{13}	—	October 23, 1997	Kitt Peak	Spacewatch	·	4.3 km	MPC · JPL
100634	1997 UE_{24}	—	October 30, 1997	Anderson Mesa	B. A. Skiff	·	1.3 km	MPC · JPL
100635	1997 UQ_{24}	—	October 30, 1997	Bergisch Gladbach	W. Bickel	(5)	2.2 km	MPC · JPL
100636	1997 UY_{26}	—	October 26, 1997	La Silla	Uppsala-DLR Trojan Survey	PHO	2.3 km	MPC · JPL
100637	1997 VF_{2}	—	November 1, 1997	Kitami	K. Endate, K. Watanabe	EUN	2.5 km	MPC · JPL
100638	1997 VS_{2}	—	November 1, 1997	Xinglong	SCAP	·	5.5 km	MPC · JPL
100639	1997 VV_{3}	—	November 6, 1997	Oizumi	T. Kobayashi	EUN	2.7 km	MPC · JPL
100640	1997 VY_{3}	—	November 7, 1997	Zeno	T. Stafford	·	6.0 km	MPC · JPL
100641 Cledassou	1997 VO_{4}	Cledassou	November 3, 1997	Sormano	Giuliani, V., F. Manca	·	2.7 km	MPC · JPL
100642	1997 VV_{4}	—	November 4, 1997	Nachi-Katsuura	Y. Shimizu, T. Urata	(5)	3.0 km	MPC · JPL
100643	1997 VZ_{5}	—	November 9, 1997	Oizumi	T. Kobayashi	·	3.0 km	MPC · JPL
100644	1997 VV_{6}	—	November 1, 1997	Kitami	K. Endate, K. Watanabe	RAF	4.7 km	MPC · JPL
100645	1997 VP_{8}	—	November 3, 1997	Xinglong	SCAP	·	2.6 km	MPC · JPL
100646	1997 WR	—	November 19, 1997	Oizumi	T. Kobayashi	·	3.2 km	MPC · JPL
100647	1997 WS_{2}	—	November 23, 1997	Oizumi	T. Kobayashi	·	1.3 km	MPC · JPL
100648	1997 WZ_{2}	—	November 23, 1997	Oizumi	T. Kobayashi	·	1.6 km	MPC · JPL
100649	1997 WF_{4}	—	November 20, 1997	Kitt Peak	Spacewatch	·	2.1 km	MPC · JPL
100650	1997 WN_{4}	—	November 20, 1997	Kitt Peak	Spacewatch	·	2.8 km	MPC · JPL
100651	1997 WU_{10}	—	November 22, 1997	Kitt Peak	Spacewatch	·	2.2 km	MPC · JPL
100652	1997 WN_{11}	—	November 22, 1997	Kitt Peak	Spacewatch	·	2.4 km	MPC · JPL
100653	1997 WD_{12}	—	November 22, 1997	Kitt Peak	Spacewatch	(5)	2.2 km	MPC · JPL
100654	1997 WM_{12}	—	November 23, 1997	Kitt Peak	Spacewatch	·	2.1 km	MPC · JPL
100655	1997 WJ_{14}	—	November 22, 1997	Kitt Peak	Spacewatch	·	3.6 km	MPC · JPL
100656	1997 WD_{17}	—	November 23, 1997	Kitt Peak	Spacewatch	·	2.4 km	MPC · JPL
100657	1997 WT_{18}	—	November 23, 1997	Kitt Peak	Spacewatch	·	2.5 km	MPC · JPL
100658	1997 WH_{20}	—	November 25, 1997	Kitt Peak	Spacewatch	·	3.6 km	MPC · JPL
100659	1997 WM_{20}	—	November 25, 1997	Kitt Peak	Spacewatch	·	2.1 km	MPC · JPL
100660	1997 WL_{21}	—	November 30, 1997	Oizumi	T. Kobayashi	·	3.5 km	MPC · JPL
100661	1997 WZ_{26}	—	November 28, 1997	Kitt Peak	Spacewatch	·	2.3 km	MPC · JPL
100662	1997 WM_{28}	—	November 29, 1997	Kitt Peak	Spacewatch	·	3.3 km	MPC · JPL
100663	1997 WN_{30}	—	November 29, 1997	Socorro	LINEAR	HYG	5.5 km	MPC · JPL
100664	1997 WZ_{35}	—	November 29, 1997	Socorro	LINEAR	·	3.7 km	MPC · JPL
100665	1997 WT_{36}	—	November 29, 1997	Socorro	LINEAR	·	3.0 km	MPC · JPL
100666	1997 WO_{37}	—	November 29, 1997	Socorro	LINEAR	·	3.3 km	MPC · JPL
100667	1997 WH_{40}	—	November 29, 1997	Socorro	LINEAR	MAS	1.5 km	MPC · JPL
100668	1997 WH_{44}	—	November 29, 1997	Socorro	LINEAR	·	1.8 km	MPC · JPL
100669	1997 WK_{50}	—	November 28, 1997	Xinglong	SCAP	·	2.4 km	MPC · JPL
100670	1997 WV_{50}	—	November 29, 1997	Socorro	LINEAR	·	3.4 km	MPC · JPL
100671	1997 WN_{57}	—	November 26, 1997	La Silla	Uppsala-DLR Trojan Survey	·	3.0 km	MPC · JPL
100672	1997 WF_{58}	—	November 30, 1997	La Silla	Uppsala-DLR Trojan Survey	·	1.8 km	MPC · JPL
100673	1997 XY	—	December 3, 1997	Oizumi	T. Kobayashi	(5)	2.5 km	MPC · JPL
100674	1997 XX_{1}	—	December 2, 1997	Nachi-Katsuura	Y. Shimizu, T. Urata	·	4.0 km	MPC · JPL
100675 Chuyanakahara	1997 XP_{2}	Chuyanakahara	December 4, 1997	Kuma Kogen	A. Nakamura	(5)	3.8 km	MPC · JPL
100676	1997 XO_{5}	—	December 6, 1997	Farra d'Isonzo	Farra d'Isonzo	(5)	1.9 km	MPC · JPL
100677	1997 XO_{6}	—	December 5, 1997	Caussols	ODAS	·	2.8 km	MPC · JPL
100678	1997 XV_{9}	—	December 4, 1997	Xinglong	SCAP	·	2.7 km	MPC · JPL
100679	1997 XV_{10}	—	December 15, 1997	Xinglong	SCAP	·	1.4 km	MPC · JPL
100680	1997 XW_{10}	—	December 15, 1997	Xinglong	SCAP	·	3.1 km	MPC · JPL
100681	1997 YD_{1}	—	December 19, 1997	Xinglong	SCAP	·	2.4 km	MPC · JPL
100682	1997 YE_{1}	—	December 19, 1997	Xinglong	SCAP	·	5.4 km	MPC · JPL
100683	1997 YW_{1}	—	December 20, 1997	Xinglong	SCAP	·	7.5 km	MPC · JPL
100684	1997 YX_{1}	—	December 21, 1997	Xinglong	SCAP	·	5.2 km	MPC · JPL
100685	1997 YH_{2}	—	December 21, 1997	Oizumi	T. Kobayashi	·	1.4 km	MPC · JPL
100686	1997 YA_{3}	—	December 24, 1997	Oizumi	T. Kobayashi	·	3.1 km	MPC · JPL
100687	1997 YF_{4}	—	December 23, 1997	Xinglong	SCAP	(17392)	3.7 km	MPC · JPL
100688	1997 YU_{5}	—	December 25, 1997	Oizumi	T. Kobayashi	·	3.4 km	MPC · JPL
100689	1997 YW_{6}	—	December 25, 1997	Chichibu	N. Satō	·	3.9 km	MPC · JPL
100690	1997 YY_{6}	—	December 25, 1997	Stakenbridge	B. G. W. Manning	·	1.5 km	MPC · JPL
100691 Hasetoshitsuka	1997 YF_{7}	Hasetoshitsuka	December 25, 1997	Saji	Saji	·	1.6 km	MPC · JPL
100692	1997 YJ_{7}	—	December 27, 1997	Oizumi	T. Kobayashi	·	5.9 km	MPC · JPL
100693	1997 YP_{9}	—	December 26, 1997	Haleakala	NEAT	EUN	3.2 km	MPC · JPL
100694	1997 YH_{11}	—	December 21, 1997	Xinglong	SCAP	(5)	2.9 km	MPC · JPL
100695	1997 YK_{11}	—	December 28, 1997	Cloudcroft	W. Offutt	·	1.4 km	MPC · JPL
100696	1997 YJ_{14}	—	December 31, 1997	Oizumi	T. Kobayashi	·	2.0 km	MPC · JPL
100697	1997 YB_{15}	—	December 28, 1997	Kitt Peak	Spacewatch	·	1.3 km	MPC · JPL
100698	1997 YK_{15}	—	December 29, 1997	Kitt Peak	Spacewatch	·	3.3 km	MPC · JPL
100699	1997 YR_{17}	—	December 31, 1997	Kitt Peak	Spacewatch	THM	4.2 km	MPC · JPL
100700	1997 YX_{17}	—	December 31, 1997	Kitt Peak	Spacewatch	·	1.6 km	MPC · JPL

== 100701–100800 ==
back to top

Designation			Discovery			Properties		Ref
Permanent	Provisional	Named after	Date	Site	Discoverer(s)	Category	Diam.	Ref
100701	1998 AC_{1}	—	January 5, 1998	Oizumi	T. Kobayashi	·	2.1 km	MPC · JPL
100702	1998 AK_{1}	—	January 1, 1998	Kitt Peak	Spacewatch	·	1.4 km	MPC · JPL
100703	1998 AL_{3}	—	January 5, 1998	Chichibu	N. Satō	DOR	4.6 km	MPC · JPL
100704	1998 BG	—	January 17, 1998	Modra	L. Kornoš, P. Kolény	EUN	2.9 km	MPC · JPL
100705	1998 BO_{5}	—	January 22, 1998	Kitt Peak	Spacewatch	AGN	1.9 km	MPC · JPL
100706	1998 BQ_{7}	—	January 24, 1998	Haleakala	NEAT	·	4.2 km	MPC · JPL
100707	1998 BW_{14}	—	January 25, 1998	Modra	A. Galád, A. Pravda	AGN	2.6 km	MPC · JPL
100708	1998 BL_{17}	—	January 22, 1998	Kitt Peak	Spacewatch	·	4.1 km	MPC · JPL
100709	1998 BP_{17}	—	January 22, 1998	Kitt Peak	Spacewatch	·	1.5 km	MPC · JPL
100710	1998 BU_{17}	—	January 22, 1998	Kitt Peak	Spacewatch	·	1.2 km	MPC · JPL
100711	1998 BD_{19}	—	January 27, 1998	Sormano	A. Testa, Ghezzi, P.	·	1.5 km	MPC · JPL
100712	1998 BW_{19}	—	January 22, 1998	Kitt Peak	Spacewatch	·	1.2 km	MPC · JPL
100713	1998 BG_{20}	—	January 22, 1998	Kitt Peak	Spacewatch	·	3.9 km	MPC · JPL
100714	1998 BM_{20}	—	January 22, 1998	Kitt Peak	Spacewatch	·	7.5 km	MPC · JPL
100715	1998 BK_{21}	—	January 22, 1998	Kitt Peak	Spacewatch	·	4.0 km	MPC · JPL
100716	1998 BF_{23}	—	January 25, 1998	Kitt Peak	Spacewatch	·	2.8 km	MPC · JPL
100717	1998 BL_{23}	—	January 25, 1998	Kitt Peak	Spacewatch	·	1.8 km	MPC · JPL
100718	1998 BR_{24}	—	January 28, 1998	Oizumi	T. Kobayashi	·	2.4 km	MPC · JPL
100719	1998 BU_{26}	—	January 29, 1998	Kleť	M. Tichý, Z. Moravec	·	1.3 km	MPC · JPL
100720	1998 BA_{28}	—	January 23, 1998	Kitt Peak	Spacewatch	CYB	7.0 km	MPC · JPL
100721	1998 BD_{29}	—	January 25, 1998	Kitt Peak	Spacewatch	·	1.3 km	MPC · JPL
100722	1998 BB_{30}	—	January 29, 1998	Kitt Peak	Spacewatch	·	1.6 km	MPC · JPL
100723	1998 BM_{35}	—	January 28, 1998	Kitt Peak	Spacewatch	·	1.8 km	MPC · JPL
100724	1998 BM_{38}	—	January 29, 1998	Kitt Peak	Spacewatch	·	3.3 km	MPC · JPL
100725	1998 BO_{43}	—	January 23, 1998	Kitt Peak	Spacewatch	·	4.8 km	MPC · JPL
100726 Marcoiozzi	1998 BY_{43}	Marcoiozzi	January 25, 1998	Cima Ekar	M. Tombelli, A. Boattini	·	4.6 km	MPC · JPL
100727	1998 BF_{45}	—	January 22, 1998	Kitt Peak	Spacewatch	·	6.3 km	MPC · JPL
100728 Kamenice n Lipou	1998 CK	Kamenice n Lipou	February 2, 1998	Kleť	M. Tichý, Z. Moravec	·	3.3 km	MPC · JPL
100729	1998 CX	—	February 5, 1998	Kleť	M. Tichý, Z. Moravec	WIT	2.0 km	MPC · JPL
100730	1998 CE_{2}	—	February 13, 1998	San Marcello	L. Tesi, A. Boattini	·	1.9 km	MPC · JPL
100731 Ara Pacis	1998 DO	Ara Pacis	February 18, 1998	Colleverde	V. S. Casulli	·	3.9 km	MPC · JPL
100732 Blankavalois	1998 DQ	Blankavalois	February 19, 1998	Kleť	M. Tichý	·	3.8 km	MPC · JPL
100733 Annafalcká	1998 DA_{1}	Annafalcká	February 18, 1998	Kleť	M. Tichý	(2076)	1.2 km	MPC · JPL
100734 Annasvídnická	1998 DB_{1}	Annasvídnická	February 18, 1998	Kleť	M. Tichý	THM	3.4 km	MPC · JPL
100735 Alpomořanská	1998 DE_{1}	Alpomořanská	February 19, 1998	Kleť	M. Tichý, J. Tichá	·	1.7 km	MPC · JPL
100736	1998 DD_{7}	—	February 17, 1998	Kitt Peak	Spacewatch	·	5.4 km	MPC · JPL
100737	1998 DR_{9}	—	February 23, 1998	Modra	A. Galád, Pravda, A.	V	1.0 km	MPC · JPL
100738	1998 DB_{12}	—	February 23, 1998	Kitt Peak	Spacewatch	·	1.7 km	MPC · JPL
100739	1998 DA_{14}	—	February 27, 1998	Caussols	ODAS	·	1.7 km	MPC · JPL
100740	1998 DP_{22}	—	February 24, 1998	Kitt Peak	Spacewatch	ADE	5.2 km	MPC · JPL
100741	1998 DS_{23}	—	February 26, 1998	Farra d'Isonzo	Farra d'Isonzo	·	3.1 km	MPC · JPL
100742	1998 DW_{25}	—	February 23, 1998	Kitt Peak	Spacewatch	MAS	940 m	MPC · JPL
100743	1998 DC_{30}	—	February 23, 1998	Kitt Peak	Spacewatch	·	1.6 km	MPC · JPL
100744	1998 DU_{36}	—	February 28, 1998	La Silla	C.-I. Lagerkvist	·	1.8 km	MPC · JPL
100745	1998 ET_{3}	—	March 2, 1998	Oizumi	T. Kobayashi	·	2.0 km	MPC · JPL
100746	1998 ED_{4}	—	March 2, 1998	Kitt Peak	Spacewatch	·	1.5 km	MPC · JPL
100747	1998 EO_{4}	—	March 3, 1998	Teide	Teide	·	1.2 km	MPC · JPL
100748	1998 EW_{4}	—	March 1, 1998	Kitt Peak	Spacewatch	·	1.6 km	MPC · JPL
100749	1998 EN_{5}	—	March 1, 1998	Kitt Peak	Spacewatch	·	1.7 km	MPC · JPL
100750	1998 EX_{8}	—	March 6, 1998	Gekko	T. Kagawa	·	4.6 km	MPC · JPL
100751	1998 EQ_{13}	—	March 1, 1998	La Silla	E. W. Elst	·	1.9 km	MPC · JPL
100752	1998 EF_{20}	—	March 3, 1998	La Silla	E. W. Elst	·	2.5 km	MPC · JPL
100753	1998 FN_{1}	—	March 19, 1998	Mallorca	Á. López J., R. Pacheco	·	2.9 km	MPC · JPL
100754	1998 FP_{2}	—	March 20, 1998	Socorro	LINEAR	·	1.2 km	MPC · JPL
100755	1998 FO_{3}	—	March 20, 1998	Kitt Peak	Spacewatch	·	3.3 km	MPC · JPL
100756	1998 FM_{5}	—	March 24, 1998	Haleakala	NEAT	AMO · APO +1km	1.8 km	MPC · JPL
100757	1998 FA_{7}	—	March 20, 1998	Kitt Peak	Spacewatch	·	950 m	MPC · JPL
100758	1998 FH_{7}	—	March 20, 1998	Kitt Peak	Spacewatch	·	1.8 km	MPC · JPL
100759	1998 FG_{9}	—	March 22, 1998	Kitt Peak	Spacewatch	·	6.9 km	MPC · JPL
100760	1998 FN_{10}	—	March 24, 1998	Caussols	ODAS	NYS	1.9 km	MPC · JPL
100761	1998 FT_{10}	—	March 24, 1998	Caussols	ODAS	·	2.1 km	MPC · JPL
100762	1998 FX_{14}	—	March 26, 1998	Caussols	ODAS	·	4.5 km	MPC · JPL
100763	1998 FK_{18}	—	March 20, 1998	Socorro	LINEAR	·	1.8 km	MPC · JPL
100764	1998 FR_{23}	—	March 20, 1998	Socorro	LINEAR	·	1.7 km	MPC · JPL
100765	1998 FZ_{23}	—	March 20, 1998	Socorro	LINEAR	·	1.6 km	MPC · JPL
100766	1998 FX_{24}	—	March 20, 1998	Socorro	LINEAR	·	2.6 km	MPC · JPL
100767	1998 FE_{26}	—	March 20, 1998	Socorro	LINEAR	NYS	2.4 km	MPC · JPL
100768	1998 FN_{27}	—	March 20, 1998	Socorro	LINEAR	·	4.7 km	MPC · JPL
100769	1998 FU_{29}	—	March 20, 1998	Socorro	LINEAR	·	1.5 km	MPC · JPL
100770	1998 FG_{31}	—	March 20, 1998	Socorro	LINEAR	·	1.7 km	MPC · JPL
100771	1998 FA_{32}	—	March 20, 1998	Socorro	LINEAR	·	1.4 km	MPC · JPL
100772	1998 FN_{34}	—	March 20, 1998	Socorro	LINEAR	·	5.0 km	MPC · JPL
100773	1998 FU_{34}	—	March 20, 1998	Socorro	LINEAR	·	2.0 km	MPC · JPL
100774	1998 FV_{37}	—	March 20, 1998	Socorro	LINEAR	·	1.9 km	MPC · JPL
100775	1998 FL_{42}	—	March 20, 1998	Socorro	LINEAR	·	4.6 km	MPC · JPL
100776	1998 FY_{46}	—	March 20, 1998	Socorro	LINEAR	·	2.3 km	MPC · JPL
100777	1998 FL_{52}	—	March 20, 1998	Socorro	LINEAR	·	1.6 km	MPC · JPL
100778	1998 FX_{52}	—	March 20, 1998	Socorro	LINEAR	·	1.3 km	MPC · JPL
100779	1998 FJ_{53}	—	March 20, 1998	Socorro	LINEAR	·	1.5 km	MPC · JPL
100780	1998 FU_{55}	—	March 20, 1998	Socorro	LINEAR	·	2.3 km	MPC · JPL
100781	1998 FX_{56}	—	March 20, 1998	Socorro	LINEAR	·	4.8 km	MPC · JPL
100782	1998 FC_{57}	—	March 20, 1998	Socorro	LINEAR	·	1.7 km	MPC · JPL
100783	1998 FZ_{57}	—	March 20, 1998	Socorro	LINEAR	·	1.6 km	MPC · JPL
100784	1998 FM_{61}	—	March 20, 1998	Socorro	LINEAR	ERI	4.6 km	MPC · JPL
100785	1998 FA_{62}	—	March 20, 1998	Socorro	LINEAR	·	1.6 km	MPC · JPL
100786	1998 FZ_{69}	—	March 20, 1998	Socorro	LINEAR	·	1.4 km	MPC · JPL
100787	1998 FW_{70}	—	March 20, 1998	Socorro	LINEAR	·	2.4 km	MPC · JPL
100788	1998 FC_{72}	—	March 20, 1998	Socorro	LINEAR	·	3.7 km	MPC · JPL
100789	1998 FK_{74}	—	March 21, 1998	Bergisch Gladbach	W. Bickel	·	1.2 km	MPC · JPL
100790	1998 FQ_{74}	—	March 24, 1998	Bergisch Gladbach	W. Bickel	EOS	3.2 km	MPC · JPL
100791	1998 FW_{75}	—	March 24, 1998	Socorro	LINEAR	PHO	2.4 km	MPC · JPL
100792	1998 FZ_{75}	—	March 24, 1998	Socorro	LINEAR	V	1.1 km	MPC · JPL
100793	1998 FJ_{76}	—	March 24, 1998	Socorro	LINEAR	·	1.9 km	MPC · JPL
100794	1998 FK_{76}	—	March 24, 1998	Socorro	LINEAR	·	1.3 km	MPC · JPL
100795	1998 FS_{76}	—	March 24, 1998	Socorro	LINEAR	·	2.3 km	MPC · JPL
100796	1998 FM_{77}	—	March 24, 1998	Socorro	LINEAR	·	2.6 km	MPC · JPL
100797	1998 FP_{78}	—	March 24, 1998	Socorro	LINEAR	·	6.3 km	MPC · JPL
100798	1998 FG_{79}	—	March 24, 1998	Socorro	LINEAR	·	2.0 km	MPC · JPL
100799	1998 FX_{79}	—	March 24, 1998	Socorro	LINEAR	·	2.4 km	MPC · JPL
100800	1998 FZ_{89}	—	March 24, 1998	Socorro	LINEAR	·	4.5 km	MPC · JPL

== 100801–100900 ==
back to top

Designation			Discovery			Properties		Ref
Permanent	Provisional	Named after	Date	Site	Discoverer(s)	Category	Diam.	Ref
100801	1998 FW_{90}	—	March 24, 1998	Socorro	LINEAR	·	2.1 km	MPC · JPL
100802	1998 FK_{93}	—	March 24, 1998	Socorro	LINEAR	·	2.6 km	MPC · JPL
100803	1998 FP_{98}	—	March 31, 1998	Socorro	LINEAR	·	4.3 km	MPC · JPL
100804	1998 FM_{105}	—	March 31, 1998	Socorro	LINEAR	·	1.8 km	MPC · JPL
100805	1998 FX_{105}	—	March 31, 1998	Socorro	LINEAR	·	1.9 km	MPC · JPL
100806	1998 FD_{107}	—	March 31, 1998	Socorro	LINEAR	·	2.4 km	MPC · JPL
100807	1998 FA_{115}	—	March 31, 1998	Socorro	LINEAR	(5)	1.8 km	MPC · JPL
100808	1998 FP_{116}	—	March 31, 1998	Socorro	LINEAR	·	1.5 km	MPC · JPL
100809	1998 FW_{117}	—	March 31, 1998	Socorro	LINEAR	·	2.6 km	MPC · JPL
100810	1998 FW_{119}	—	March 20, 1998	Socorro	LINEAR	·	1.5 km	MPC · JPL
100811	1998 FB_{120}	—	March 20, 1998	Socorro	LINEAR	·	1.5 km	MPC · JPL
100812	1998 FK_{123}	—	March 20, 1998	Socorro	LINEAR	ADE	4.5 km	MPC · JPL
100813	1998 FE_{124}	—	March 24, 1998	Socorro	LINEAR	·	3.3 km	MPC · JPL
100814	1998 FA_{125}	—	March 24, 1998	Socorro	LINEAR	·	1.8 km	MPC · JPL
100815	1998 FQ_{125}	—	March 31, 1998	Socorro	LINEAR	DOR	6.7 km	MPC · JPL
100816	1998 FT_{129}	—	March 22, 1998	Socorro	LINEAR	NYS	1.9 km	MPC · JPL
100817	1998 FM_{133}	—	March 20, 1998	Socorro	LINEAR	·	2.0 km	MPC · JPL
100818	1998 FW_{133}	—	March 20, 1998	Socorro	LINEAR	·	1.4 km	MPC · JPL
100819	1998 FX_{133}	—	March 20, 1998	Socorro	LINEAR	·	4.6 km	MPC · JPL
100820	1998 FM_{139}	—	March 28, 1998	Socorro	LINEAR	·	2.4 km	MPC · JPL
100821	1998 FA_{140}	—	March 28, 1998	Socorro	LINEAR	·	1.3 km	MPC · JPL
100822	1998 FG_{140}	—	March 29, 1998	Socorro	LINEAR	·	2.4 km	MPC · JPL
100823	1998 FS_{140}	—	March 29, 1998	Socorro	LINEAR	·	3.5 km	MPC · JPL
100824	1998 FF_{142}	—	March 29, 1998	Socorro	LINEAR	·	2.0 km	MPC · JPL
100825	1998 FW_{145}	—	March 24, 1998	Socorro	LINEAR	·	1.8 km	MPC · JPL
100826	1998 HH_{2}	—	April 18, 1998	Kitt Peak	Spacewatch	·	1.9 km	MPC · JPL
100827	1998 HU_{2}	—	April 20, 1998	Kitt Peak	Spacewatch	·	2.3 km	MPC · JPL
100828	1998 HM_{6}	—	April 21, 1998	Caussols	ODAS	·	1.8 km	MPC · JPL
100829	1998 HW_{8}	—	April 17, 1998	Kitt Peak	Spacewatch	·	1.4 km	MPC · JPL
100830	1998 HV_{9}	—	April 19, 1998	Kitt Peak	Spacewatch	·	5.0 km	MPC · JPL
100831	1998 HW_{9}	—	April 19, 1998	Kitt Peak	Spacewatch	·	2.0 km	MPC · JPL
100832	1998 HS_{10}	—	April 17, 1998	Kitt Peak	Spacewatch	fast	1.4 km	MPC · JPL
100833	1998 HW_{10}	—	April 17, 1998	Kitt Peak	Spacewatch	·	5.7 km	MPC · JPL
100834	1998 HS_{12}	—	April 24, 1998	Kitt Peak	Spacewatch	·	1.3 km	MPC · JPL
100835	1998 HA_{14}	—	April 24, 1998	Haleakala	NEAT	PHO	2.0 km	MPC · JPL
100836	1998 HF_{14}	—	April 22, 1998	Kitt Peak	Spacewatch	·	6.2 km	MPC · JPL
100837	1998 HG_{15}	—	April 20, 1998	Kitt Peak	Spacewatch	·	1.7 km	MPC · JPL
100838	1998 HB_{16}	—	April 22, 1998	Kitt Peak	Spacewatch	·	1.4 km	MPC · JPL
100839	1998 HW_{18}	—	April 18, 1998	Socorro	LINEAR	·	1.3 km	MPC · JPL
100840	1998 HD_{19}	—	April 18, 1998	Socorro	LINEAR	·	4.1 km	MPC · JPL
100841	1998 HU_{19}	—	April 18, 1998	Socorro	LINEAR	PHO	4.7 km	MPC · JPL
100842	1998 HX_{19}	—	April 18, 1998	Socorro	LINEAR	·	4.3 km	MPC · JPL
100843	1998 HH_{21}	—	April 20, 1998	Socorro	LINEAR	·	1.8 km	MPC · JPL
100844	1998 HH_{23}	—	April 20, 1998	Socorro	LINEAR	·	4.9 km	MPC · JPL
100845	1998 HY_{23}	—	April 28, 1998	Kitt Peak	Spacewatch	·	1.5 km	MPC · JPL
100846	1998 HW_{25}	—	April 20, 1998	Kitt Peak	Spacewatch	·	2.1 km	MPC · JPL
100847	1998 HN_{26}	—	April 20, 1998	Kitt Peak	Spacewatch	·	2.0 km	MPC · JPL
100848	1998 HE_{29}	—	April 20, 1998	Socorro	LINEAR	·	2.6 km	MPC · JPL
100849	1998 HN_{29}	—	April 20, 1998	Socorro	LINEAR	V	1.1 km	MPC · JPL
100850	1998 HV_{31}	—	April 22, 1998	Socorro	LINEAR	PHO	2.0 km	MPC · JPL
100851	1998 HB_{33}	—	April 20, 1998	Socorro	LINEAR	·	2.3 km	MPC · JPL
100852	1998 HY_{33}	—	April 20, 1998	Socorro	LINEAR	·	2.6 km	MPC · JPL
100853	1998 HH_{34}	—	April 20, 1998	Socorro	LINEAR	·	2.8 km	MPC · JPL
100854	1998 HU_{35}	—	April 20, 1998	Socorro	LINEAR	NYS	2.7 km	MPC · JPL
100855	1998 HH_{37}	—	April 20, 1998	Socorro	LINEAR	NYS	2.6 km	MPC · JPL
100856	1998 HX_{43}	—	April 20, 1998	Socorro	LINEAR	MAS	1.5 km	MPC · JPL
100857	1998 HZ_{43}	—	April 20, 1998	Socorro	LINEAR	·	4.3 km	MPC · JPL
100858	1998 HB_{44}	—	April 20, 1998	Socorro	LINEAR	·	7.5 km	MPC · JPL
100859	1998 HR_{46}	—	April 20, 1998	Socorro	LINEAR	·	4.1 km	MPC · JPL
100860	1998 HA_{52}	—	April 30, 1998	Anderson Mesa	LONEOS	·	2.4 km	MPC · JPL
100861	1998 HX_{53}	—	April 21, 1998	Socorro	LINEAR	EOS	4.3 km	MPC · JPL
100862	1998 HF_{54}	—	April 21, 1998	Socorro	LINEAR	HYG	5.6 km	MPC · JPL
100863	1998 HQ_{54}	—	April 21, 1998	Socorro	LINEAR	·	2.1 km	MPC · JPL
100864	1998 HW_{54}	—	April 21, 1998	Socorro	LINEAR	·	3.0 km	MPC · JPL
100865	1998 HA_{58}	—	April 21, 1998	Socorro	LINEAR	·	2.3 km	MPC · JPL
100866	1998 HM_{60}	—	April 21, 1998	Socorro	LINEAR	·	2.9 km	MPC · JPL
100867	1998 HC_{61}	—	April 21, 1998	Socorro	LINEAR	·	1.2 km	MPC · JPL
100868	1998 HE_{61}	—	April 21, 1998	Socorro	LINEAR	·	1.9 km	MPC · JPL
100869	1998 HQ_{71}	—	April 21, 1998	Socorro	LINEAR	EOS	4.4 km	MPC · JPL
100870	1998 HM_{78}	—	April 21, 1998	Socorro	LINEAR	NYS	2.2 km	MPC · JPL
100871	1998 HH_{81}	—	April 21, 1998	Socorro	LINEAR	·	1.1 km	MPC · JPL
100872	1998 HS_{81}	—	April 21, 1998	Socorro	LINEAR	·	7.5 km	MPC · JPL
100873	1998 HT_{82}	—	April 21, 1998	Socorro	LINEAR	NYS	1.6 km	MPC · JPL
100874	1998 HG_{83}	—	April 21, 1998	Socorro	LINEAR	·	6.0 km	MPC · JPL
100875	1998 HW_{84}	—	April 21, 1998	Socorro	LINEAR	·	2.4 km	MPC · JPL
100876	1998 HK_{86}	—	April 21, 1998	Socorro	LINEAR	·	1.2 km	MPC · JPL
100877	1998 HN_{86}	—	April 21, 1998	Socorro	LINEAR	·	5.6 km	MPC · JPL
100878	1998 HJ_{90}	—	April 21, 1998	Socorro	LINEAR	NYS	1.3 km	MPC · JPL
100879	1998 HC_{91}	—	April 21, 1998	Socorro	LINEAR	·	1.7 km	MPC · JPL
100880	1998 HM_{93}	—	April 21, 1998	Socorro	LINEAR	·	6.2 km	MPC · JPL
100881	1998 HK_{98}	—	April 21, 1998	Socorro	LINEAR	·	1.7 km	MPC · JPL
100882	1998 HK_{101}	—	April 21, 1998	Socorro	LINEAR	·	1.4 km	MPC · JPL
100883	1998 HY_{101}	—	April 25, 1998	La Silla	E. W. Elst	·	1.8 km	MPC · JPL
100884	1998 HB_{102}	—	April 25, 1998	La Silla	E. W. Elst	·	1.9 km	MPC · JPL
100885	1998 HV_{106}	—	April 23, 1998	Socorro	LINEAR	·	2.9 km	MPC · JPL
100886	1998 HR_{108}	—	April 23, 1998	Socorro	LINEAR	·	2.3 km	MPC · JPL
100887	1998 HB_{116}	—	April 23, 1998	Socorro	LINEAR	·	7.1 km	MPC · JPL
100888	1998 HH_{117}	—	April 23, 1998	Socorro	LINEAR	V	1.2 km	MPC · JPL
100889	1998 HU_{117}	—	April 23, 1998	Socorro	LINEAR	(2076)	1.8 km	MPC · JPL
100890	1998 HS_{122}	—	April 23, 1998	Socorro	LINEAR	·	1.6 km	MPC · JPL
100891	1998 HJ_{124}	—	April 23, 1998	Socorro	LINEAR	·	1.9 km	MPC · JPL
100892	1998 HM_{125}	—	April 23, 1998	Socorro	LINEAR	·	2.4 km	MPC · JPL
100893	1998 HH_{130}	—	April 19, 1998	Socorro	LINEAR	·	4.7 km	MPC · JPL
100894	1998 HK_{145}	—	April 21, 1998	Socorro	LINEAR	·	2.4 km	MPC · JPL
100895	1998 HN_{146}	—	April 22, 1998	Socorro	LINEAR	·	5.5 km	MPC · JPL
100896	1998 JT_{3}	—	May 6, 1998	Caussols	ODAS	HYG	6.5 km	MPC · JPL
100897 Piatra Neamt	1998 JW_{3}	Piatra Neamt	May 5, 1998	San Marcello	L. Tesi, Caronia, A.	·	1.3 km	MPC · JPL
100898	1998 JG_{4}	—	May 15, 1998	Woomera	F. B. Zoltowski	NYS	2.3 km	MPC · JPL
100899	1998 KC_{6}	—	May 24, 1998	Kitt Peak	Spacewatch	NYS	2.2 km	MPC · JPL
100900	1998 KU_{6}	—	May 22, 1998	Anderson Mesa	LONEOS	·	2.0 km	MPC · JPL

== 100901–101000 ==
back to top

Designation			Discovery			Properties		Ref
Permanent	Provisional	Named after	Date	Site	Discoverer(s)	Category	Diam.	Ref
100901	1998 KZ_{6}	—	May 22, 1998	Anderson Mesa	LONEOS	·	2.5 km	MPC · JPL
100902	1998 KS_{8}	—	May 23, 1998	Anderson Mesa	LONEOS	·	1.8 km	MPC · JPL
100903	1998 KU_{8}	—	May 23, 1998	Anderson Mesa	LONEOS	·	2.3 km	MPC · JPL
100904	1998 KW_{10}	—	May 22, 1998	Kitt Peak	Spacewatch	EOS	3.7 km	MPC · JPL
100905	1998 KY_{11}	—	May 26, 1998	Kitt Peak	Spacewatch	URS	7.0 km	MPC · JPL
100906	1998 KF_{15}	—	May 22, 1998	Socorro	LINEAR	·	1.3 km	MPC · JPL
100907	1998 KP_{16}	—	May 22, 1998	Socorro	LINEAR	·	5.8 km	MPC · JPL
100908	1998 KH_{17}	—	May 28, 1998	Socorro	LINEAR	·	2.3 km	MPC · JPL
100909	1998 KV_{22}	—	May 22, 1998	Socorro	LINEAR	·	1.9 km	MPC · JPL
100910	1998 KR_{23}	—	May 22, 1998	Socorro	LINEAR	·	2.5 km	MPC · JPL
100911	1998 KF_{26}	—	May 22, 1998	Socorro	LINEAR	·	2.0 km	MPC · JPL
100912	1998 KU_{26}	—	May 28, 1998	Kitt Peak	Spacewatch	·	9.7 km	MPC · JPL
100913	1998 KJ_{28}	—	May 22, 1998	Socorro	LINEAR	·	1.7 km	MPC · JPL
100914	1998 KZ_{29}	—	May 22, 1998	Socorro	LINEAR	·	1.6 km	MPC · JPL
100915	1998 KH_{49}	—	May 23, 1998	Socorro	LINEAR	·	3.7 km	MPC · JPL
100916	1998 KU_{50}	—	May 23, 1998	Socorro	LINEAR	·	4.6 km	MPC · JPL
100917	1998 KX_{51}	—	May 23, 1998	Socorro	LINEAR	·	2.5 km	MPC · JPL
100918	1998 KF_{52}	—	May 23, 1998	Socorro	LINEAR	·	2.6 km	MPC · JPL
100919	1998 KU_{54}	—	May 23, 1998	Socorro	LINEAR	·	4.3 km	MPC · JPL
100920	1998 KT_{56}	—	May 23, 1998	Socorro	LINEAR	·	1.4 km	MPC · JPL
100921	1998 KZ_{60}	—	May 23, 1998	Socorro	LINEAR	·	2.9 km	MPC · JPL
100922	1998 KR_{61}	—	May 23, 1998	Socorro	LINEAR	·	2.4 km	MPC · JPL
100923	1998 LU_{1}	—	June 1, 1998	La Silla	E. W. Elst	NYS	1.7 km	MPC · JPL
100924 Luctuymans	1998 LT_{3}	Luctuymans	June 1, 1998	La Silla	E. W. Elst	NYS	1.7 km	MPC · JPL
100925	1998 LV_{3}	—	June 1, 1998	La Silla	E. W. Elst	·	2.7 km	MPC · JPL
100926	1998 MQ	—	June 18, 1998	Anderson Mesa	LONEOS	AMO +1km	1.2 km	MPC · JPL
100927	1998 MN_{1}	—	June 16, 1998	Kitt Peak	Spacewatch	·	5.7 km	MPC · JPL
100928	1998 MM_{5}	—	June 23, 1998	Kitt Peak	Spacewatch	(5)	2.3 km	MPC · JPL
100929	1998 MQ_{6}	—	June 20, 1998	Kitt Peak	Spacewatch	·	4.5 km	MPC · JPL
100930	1998 MG_{9}	—	June 19, 1998	Socorro	LINEAR	·	1.9 km	MPC · JPL
100931	1998 MP_{11}	—	June 19, 1998	Socorro	LINEAR	·	2.7 km	MPC · JPL
100932	1998 MV_{22}	—	June 22, 1998	Kitt Peak	Spacewatch	PHO	2.2 km	MPC · JPL
100933	1998 MK_{30}	—	June 30, 1998	Socorro	LINEAR	·	3.0 km	MPC · JPL
100934 Marthanussbaum	1998 MN_{41}	Marthanussbaum	June 28, 1998	La Silla	E. W. Elst	NYS	2.3 km	MPC · JPL
100935	1998 MA_{42}	—	June 26, 1998	Reedy Creek	J. Broughton	slow	2.4 km	MPC · JPL
100936 Mekong	1998 ME_{43}	Mekong	June 26, 1998	La Silla	E. W. Elst	·	2.5 km	MPC · JPL
100937	1998 MH_{43}	—	June 26, 1998	La Silla	E. W. Elst	NYS	2.9 km	MPC · JPL
100938	1998 MC_{44}	—	June 26, 1998	La Silla	E. W. Elst	·	4.4 km	MPC · JPL
100939	1998 MG_{46}	—	June 23, 1998	Anderson Mesa	LONEOS	·	1.6 km	MPC · JPL
100940 Maunder	1998 MM_{47}	Maunder	June 28, 1998	La Silla	E. W. Elst	·	4.5 km	MPC · JPL
100941	1998 MD_{48}	—	June 28, 1998	La Silla	E. W. Elst	NYS	2.2 km	MPC · JPL
100942	1998 OQ_{3}	—	July 23, 1998	Caussols	ODAS	·	2.1 km	MPC · JPL
100943	1998 OH_{4}	—	July 27, 1998	Caussols	ODAS	V	1.3 km	MPC · JPL
100944	1998 OT_{7}	—	July 26, 1998	La Silla	E. W. Elst	NYS	2.3 km	MPC · JPL
100945	1998 OE_{8}	—	July 26, 1998	La Silla	E. W. Elst	·	1.6 km	MPC · JPL
100946	1998 OD_{10}	—	July 26, 1998	La Silla	E. W. Elst	NYS	2.2 km	MPC · JPL
100947	1998 OS_{12}	—	July 26, 1998	La Silla	E. W. Elst	·	5.0 km	MPC · JPL
100948	1998 OF_{13}	—	July 26, 1998	La Silla	E. W. Elst	NYS	2.3 km	MPC · JPL
100949	1998 OJ_{14}	—	July 26, 1998	La Silla	E. W. Elst	·	1.4 km	MPC · JPL
100950	1998 PA	—	August 1, 1998	Višnjan Observatory	Višnjan	NYS	2.6 km	MPC · JPL
100951	1998 QC_{3}	—	August 17, 1998	Socorro	LINEAR	PHO	1.9 km	MPC · JPL
100952	1998 QR_{5}	—	August 19, 1998	Socorro	LINEAR	·	2.2 km	MPC · JPL
100953	1998 QB_{6}	—	August 24, 1998	Caussols	ODAS	·	2.6 km	MPC · JPL
100954	1998 QR_{6}	—	August 24, 1998	Caussols	ODAS	·	3.3 km	MPC · JPL
100955	1998 QJ_{9}	—	August 17, 1998	Socorro	LINEAR	·	1.9 km	MPC · JPL
100956	1998 QF_{10}	—	August 17, 1998	Socorro	LINEAR	·	2.3 km	MPC · JPL
100957	1998 QX_{11}	—	August 17, 1998	Socorro	LINEAR	·	2.6 km	MPC · JPL
100958	1998 QD_{12}	—	August 17, 1998	Socorro	LINEAR	·	2.2 km	MPC · JPL
100959	1998 QO_{12}	—	August 17, 1998	Socorro	LINEAR	·	5.3 km	MPC · JPL
100960	1998 QS_{12}	—	August 17, 1998	Socorro	LINEAR	·	3.8 km	MPC · JPL
100961	1998 QL_{13}	—	August 17, 1998	Socorro	LINEAR	·	3.7 km	MPC · JPL
100962	1998 QV_{13}	—	August 17, 1998	Socorro	LINEAR	·	1.5 km	MPC · JPL
100963	1998 QW_{14}	—	August 17, 1998	Socorro	LINEAR	·	5.6 km	MPC · JPL
100964	1998 QL_{16}	—	August 17, 1998	Socorro	LINEAR	ADE	4.3 km	MPC · JPL
100965	1998 QG_{17}	—	August 17, 1998	Socorro	LINEAR	V	1.7 km	MPC · JPL
100966	1998 QP_{18}	—	August 17, 1998	Socorro	LINEAR	·	2.3 km	MPC · JPL
100967	1998 QF_{20}	—	August 17, 1998	Socorro	LINEAR	·	1.9 km	MPC · JPL
100968	1998 QL_{20}	—	August 17, 1998	Socorro	LINEAR	·	2.3 km	MPC · JPL
100969	1998 QV_{21}	—	August 17, 1998	Socorro	LINEAR	NYS	2.3 km	MPC · JPL
100970	1998 QZ_{21}	—	August 17, 1998	Socorro	LINEAR	(5)	2.3 km	MPC · JPL
100971	1998 QE_{22}	—	August 17, 1998	Socorro	LINEAR	·	2.2 km	MPC · JPL
100972	1998 QP_{22}	—	August 17, 1998	Socorro	LINEAR	NYS	2.9 km	MPC · JPL
100973	1998 QZ_{23}	—	August 17, 1998	Socorro	LINEAR	·	3.1 km	MPC · JPL
100974	1998 QG_{24}	—	August 17, 1998	Socorro	LINEAR	·	2.7 km	MPC · JPL
100975	1998 QB_{25}	—	August 17, 1998	Socorro	LINEAR	NYS	3.4 km	MPC · JPL
100976	1998 QK_{25}	—	August 17, 1998	Socorro	LINEAR	·	4.8 km	MPC · JPL
100977	1998 QJ_{26}	—	August 25, 1998	Bédoin	P. Antonini	·	2.9 km	MPC · JPL
100978	1998 QB_{27}	—	August 24, 1998	Socorro	LINEAR	H	1.0 km	MPC · JPL
100979	1998 QH_{27}	—	August 24, 1998	Socorro	LINEAR	PHO	2.1 km	MPC · JPL
100980	1998 QJ_{27}	—	August 24, 1998	Socorro	LINEAR	H	1.6 km	MPC · JPL
100981	1998 QK_{27}	—	August 20, 1998	Kitt Peak	Spacewatch	NYS	2.2 km	MPC · JPL
100982	1998 QU_{28}	—	August 22, 1998	Xinglong	SCAP	·	2.3 km	MPC · JPL
100983	1998 QQ_{29}	—	August 23, 1998	Xinglong	SCAP	V	1.3 km	MPC · JPL
100984	1998 QQ_{30}	—	August 17, 1998	Socorro	LINEAR	(5)	2.5 km	MPC · JPL
100985	1998 QW_{30}	—	August 17, 1998	Socorro	LINEAR	·	4.4 km	MPC · JPL
100986	1998 QB_{33}	—	August 17, 1998	Socorro	LINEAR	NYS	2.8 km	MPC · JPL
100987	1998 QR_{33}	—	August 17, 1998	Socorro	LINEAR	(5)	2.5 km	MPC · JPL
100988	1998 QU_{33}	—	August 17, 1998	Socorro	LINEAR	·	5.2 km	MPC · JPL
100989	1998 QA_{34}	—	August 17, 1998	Socorro	LINEAR	·	2.4 km	MPC · JPL
100990	1998 QF_{36}	—	August 17, 1998	Socorro	LINEAR	V	1.3 km	MPC · JPL
100991	1998 QG_{36}	—	August 17, 1998	Socorro	LINEAR	·	1.3 km	MPC · JPL
100992	1998 QD_{37}	—	August 17, 1998	Socorro	LINEAR	·	2.0 km	MPC · JPL
100993	1998 QG_{39}	—	August 17, 1998	Socorro	LINEAR	·	4.8 km	MPC · JPL
100994	1998 QH_{39}	—	August 17, 1998	Socorro	LINEAR	·	1.6 km	MPC · JPL
100995	1998 QA_{40}	—	August 17, 1998	Socorro	LINEAR	·	4.2 km	MPC · JPL
100996	1998 QB_{41}	—	August 17, 1998	Socorro	LINEAR	·	1.7 km	MPC · JPL
100997	1998 QF_{41}	—	August 17, 1998	Socorro	LINEAR	·	1.4 km	MPC · JPL
100998	1998 QH_{41}	—	August 17, 1998	Socorro	LINEAR	·	1.6 km	MPC · JPL
100999	1998 QC_{43}	—	August 17, 1998	Socorro	LINEAR	·	1.9 km	MPC · JPL
101000	1998 QT_{43}	—	August 17, 1998	Socorro	LINEAR	NYS	2.6 km	MPC · JPL

back to top

== See also ==
- Meanings of minor-planet names: 100001–101000
