= 100268 Rosenthal =

Main-belt asteroid

Discovery
- Discovered by: F. Börngen
- Discovery site: Karl Schwarzschild Obs.
- Discovery date: 5 October 1994

Designations
- Named after: Hans Rosenthal (German TV host)
- Alternative designations: 1994 TL_{16} · 2003 AG_{8}
- Minor planet category: main-belt · (inner) background

Orbital characteristics
- Epoch 23 March 2018 (JD 2458200.5)
- Uncertainty parameter 0
- Observation arc: 27.33 yr (9,984 d)
- Aphelion: 2.8514 AU
- Perihelion: 2.0281 AU
- Semi-major axis: 2.4398 AU
- Eccentricity: 0.1687
- Orbital period (sidereal): 3.81 yr (1,392 d)
- Mean anomaly: 57.994°
- Mean motion: 0° 15^{m} 30.96^{s} / day
- Inclination: 11.756°
- Longitude of ascending node: 22.570°
- Argument of perihelion: 355.59°

Physical characteristics
- Mean diameter: 3±1 km (calculated)
- Absolute magnitude (H): 15.6

100268 Rosenthal (provisional designation 1994 TL_{16}) is a background asteroid from the inner region of the asteroid belt, approximately 3 kilometers (2 miles) in diameter. It was discovered on 5 October 1994, by German astronomer Freimut Börngen at the Karl Schwarzschild Observatory in Tautenburg, eastern Germany. The asteroid was later named for German radio and TV host Hans Rosenthal.

== Orbit and classification ==
Rosenthal is a non-family asteroid from the main belt's background population. It orbits the Sun in the inner asteroid belt at a distance of 2.0–2.9 AU once every 3 years and 10 months (1,392 days; semi-major axis of 2.44 AU). Its orbit has an eccentricity of 0.17 and an inclination of 12° with respect to the ecliptic. The body's observation arc begins with a precovery published by the Digitized Sky Survey. It was taken at the Siding Spring Observatory in September 1990, more than 4 years prior to its official discovery observation at Tautenburg.

== Physical characteristics ==
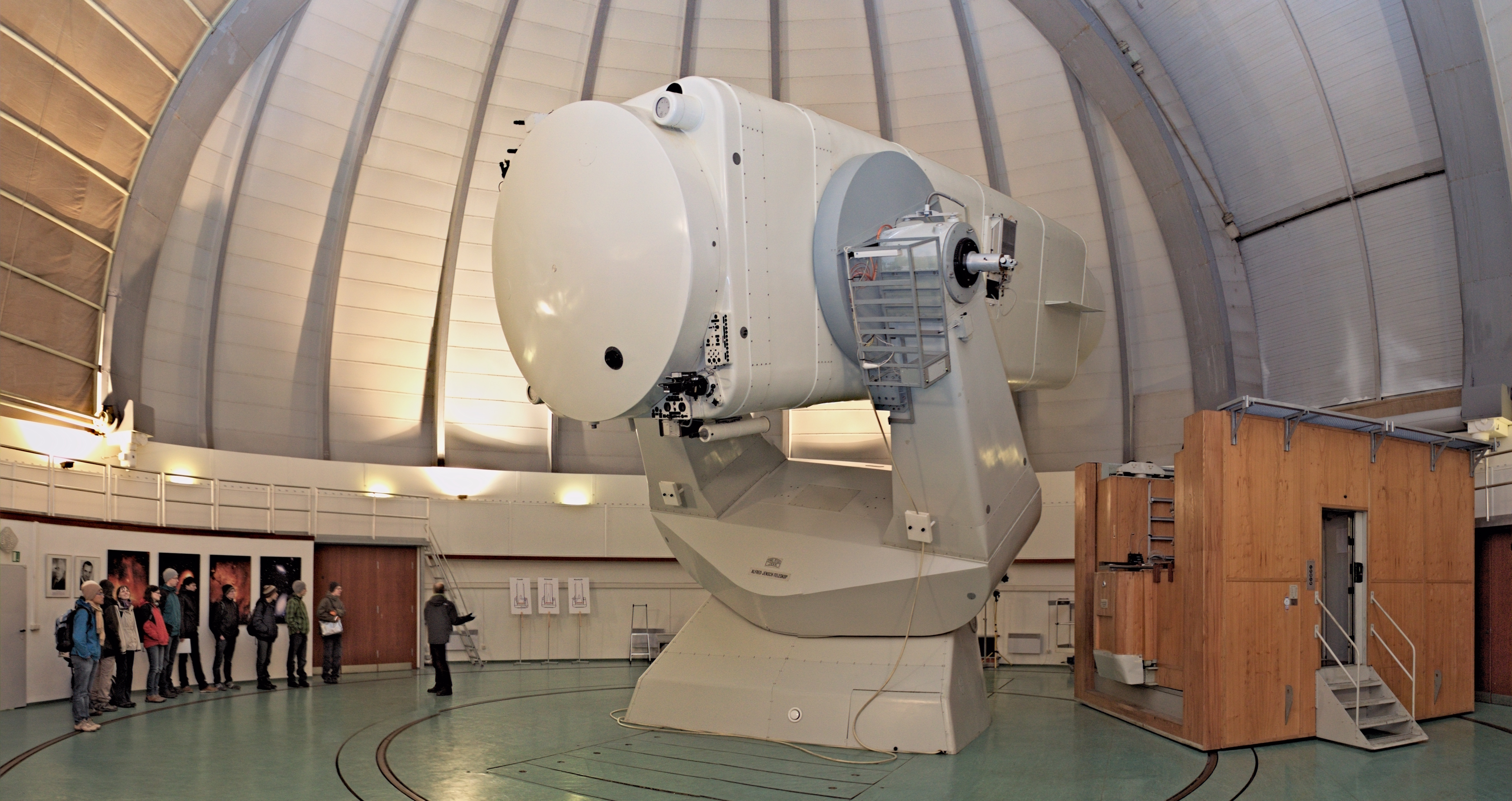
Discovering Alfred-Jensch-telescope

=== Diameter estimate ===
Based on its absolute magnitude of 15.6, its diameter is between 2 and 5 kilometers, assuming an albedo in the range of 0.05 to 0.25.

Since asteroids in the inner main-belt are often of a brighter silicaceous – rather than of a darker carbonaceous composition, with higher albedos, typically around 0.20, the asteroid's diameter might be on the lower end of NASA's published conversion table, as the lower the reflectivity (albedo), the larger the body's diameter for a given absolute magnitude.

As of 2018, Rosenthal's effective size, shape, pole, spectral type and composition, as well as its albedo and rotation period remain unknown.

== Naming ==
This minor planet was named in honour of German radio and TV host Hans Rosenthal (1925–1987), a German Jew who survived the Holocaust as a boy inside Germany and became one of the country's most popular TV show masters ever in the early 1980s. He died of cancer at the age of 61. The approved naming citation was published by the Minor Planet Center on 13 April 2006 (M.P.C. 56615).
