= Abderhalden =

Abderhalden is a Swiss surname. Notable people with the surname include:

- Emil Abderhalden (1877–1950), Swiss biochemist
- Rolf Abderhalden (born 1965), Colombian artist and theatre director
- Heidi Abderhalden (born 1962), Swiss-Colombian artist and theatre director

== See also ==
- Marianne Kaufmann-Abderhalden (born 1986), Swiss alpine skier
- 15262 Abderhalden, a Themis asteroid
- Abderhalden–Kaufmann–Lignac syndrome
- Abderhalden reaction, developed by Emil Abderhalden
