= 3917 Franz Schubert =

Main-belt asteroid

Discovery
- Discovered by: F. Börngen
- Discovery site: Karl Schwarzschild Obs.
- Discovery date: 15 February 1961

Designations
- Named after: Franz Schubert (Austrian composer)
- Alternative designations: 1961 CX · 1976 GT_{2} 1977 RU_{1} · 1981 TY_{3} 1987 HU_{1}
- Minor planet category: main-belt · (inner) background

Orbital characteristics
- Epoch 4 September 2017 (JD 2458000.5)
- Uncertainty parameter 0
- Observation arc: 56.70 yr (20,711 days)
- Aphelion: 2.4102 AU
- Perihelion: 2.3064 AU
- Semi-major axis: 2.3583 AU
- Eccentricity: 0.0220
- Orbital period (sidereal): 3.62 yr (1,323 days)
- Mean anomaly: 278.00°
- Mean motion: 0° 16^{m} 19.56^{s} / day
- Inclination: 2.4275°
- Longitude of ascending node: 137.12°
- Argument of perihelion: 298.90°

Physical characteristics
- Dimensions: 5.129±0.123 km
- Geometric albedo: 0.321±0.041
- Absolute magnitude (H): 13.6

3917 Franz Schubert, provisional designation 1961 CX, is a bright background asteroid from the inner regions of the asteroid belt, approximately 5 kilometers in diameter. It was discovered on 15 February 1961, by astronomer Freimut Börngen at the Karl Schwarzschild Observatory in Tautenburg, Germany. The asteroid was named after Austrian composer Franz Schubert.

== Orbit and classification ==
Franz Schubert is a non-family asteroid from the main belt's background population. It orbits the Sun in the inner main-belt at a distance of 2.3–2.4 AU once every 3 years and 7 months (1,323 days; semi-major axis of 2.36 AU). Its orbit has an eccentricity of 0.02 and an inclination of 2° with respect to the ecliptic.

The body's observation arc begins with its official discovery observation at Tautenburg in February 1961.

== Physical characteristics ==
=== Diameter and albedo ===
According to the survey carried out by the NEOWISE mission of NASA's Wide-field Infrared Survey Explorer, Franz Schubert measures 5.129 kilometers in diameter and its surface has a high albedo of 0.321.

=== Rotation period ===
As of 2017, no rotational lightcurve of Franz Schubert has been from photometric observations. The asteroid's rotation period, shape and poles remain unknown.

== Naming ==
This minor planet was named after Austrian composer Franz Schubert (1797–1828). The official naming citation was published by the Minor Planet Center on 20 February 1989 (M.P.C. 14208).
