= 7655 Adamries =

Main-belt asteroid

Discovery
- Discovered by: F. Börngen
- Discovery site: Karl Schwarzschild Obs.
- Discovery date: 28 December 1991

Designations
- Named after: Adam Ries (mathematician)
- Alternative designations: 1991 YM_{1} · 1977 BW
- Minor planet category: main-belt · Nysa–Polana complex

Orbital characteristics
- Epoch 4 September 2017 (JD 2458000.5)
- Uncertainty parameter 0
- Observation arc: 39.60 yr (14,464 days)
- Aphelion: 2.7494 AU
- Perihelion: 2.0848 AU
- Semi-major axis: 2.4171 AU
- Eccentricity: 0.1375
- Orbital period (sidereal): 3.76 yr (1,373 days)
- Mean anomaly: 289.57°
- Mean motion: 0° 15^{m} 44.28^{s} / day
- Inclination: 4.0156°
- Longitude of ascending node: 103.41°
- Argument of perihelion: 8.9941°

Physical characteristics
- Dimensions: 3.60 km (calculated); 4.21±0.96 km
- Synodic rotation period: 22.8758±0.1133 h
- Geometric albedo: 0.21 (assumed); 0.250±0.124
- Spectral type: C · S
- Absolute magnitude (H): 14.00 · 14.081±0.004 (R) · 14.1 · 14.53 · 14.56±0.26

7655 Adamries, provisional designation 1991 YM_{1}, is an asteroid from the inner regions of the asteroid belt, approximately 4 kilometers in diameter. It was discovered on 28 December 1991, by German astronomer Freimut Börngen at Karl Schwarzschild Observatory in Tautenburg, eastern Germany. It was named after mathematician Adam Ries.

== Classification and orbit ==
Adamries is a member of the Nysa–Polana complex, a collection of overlapping asteroid families in the inner main-belt. It orbits the Sun at a distance of 2.1–2.7 AU once every 3 years and 9 months (1,373 days). Its orbit has an eccentricity of 0.14 and an inclination of 4° with respect to the ecliptic. Adamries was first identified as 1977 BW at CrAO/Nauchnyj in 1977, extending the asteroid's observation arc by 15 years prior to its official discovery observation.

== Physical characteristics ==
Adamries has been characterized as a carbonaceous C-type asteroid by Pan-STARRS' photometric survey. It is also an assumed stony S-type asteroid.

=== Lightcurve ===
In September 2013, rotational lightcurve of Adamries was obtained from photometric observation by astronomers at the Palomar Transient Factory in California. It showed a longer-than-average rotation period of 22.8758 hours with a brightness variation of 0.33 magnitude (U=2).

=== Diameter and albedo ===
According to the survey carried out by NASA's space-based Wide-field Infrared Survey Explorer with its subsequent NEOWISE mission, Adamries measures 4.2 kilometers in diameter and its surface has an albedo of 0.25, which is typical for stony asteroids. CALL assumes a standard albedo for stony asteroids of 0.21 and calculates a diameter of 3.6 kilometers with an absolute magnitude of 14.53.

== Naming ==
This minor planet was named in honor of famous German mathematician Adam Ries (1492–1559), who wrote the first German arithmetic book in the 16th century, explaining in simple terms to the common people how to do arithmetic.

At the time, this was considered to be difficult. This minor planet was the 100th numbered discovery of astronomer Freimut Börngen. The approved naming citation was published by the Minor Planet Center on 18 August 1997 (M.P.C. 30478). This minor planet should not be confused with 236305 Adamriess, named after American astronomer and 2011 Nobel Prize winner Adam Riess.
