= 6070 Rheinland =

Main-belt asteroid

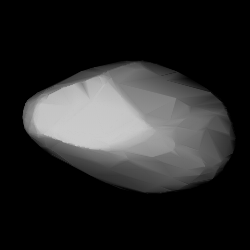
- Shape model of Rheinland from its lightcurve

Discovery
- Discovered by: F. Börngen
- Discovery site: Karl Schwarzschild Obs.
- Discovery date: 10 December 1991

Designations
- Named after: Rhineland (German region)
- Alternative designations: 1991 XO_{1} · 1950 TW_{1} 1983 NW
- Minor planet category: main-belt · (inner); Nysa–Polana complex

Orbital characteristics
- Epoch 23 March 2018 (JD 2458200.5)
- Uncertainty parameter 0
- Observation arc: 67.36 yr (24,605 d)
- Aphelion: 2.8917 AU
- Perihelion: 1.8824 AU
- Semi-major axis: 2.3870 AU
- Eccentricity: 0.2114
- Orbital period (sidereal): 3.69 yr (1,347 d)
- Mean anomaly: 96.675°
- Mean motion: 0° 16^{m} 1.92^{s} / day
- Inclination: 3.1297°
- Longitude of ascending node: 83.948°
- Argument of perihelion: 292.67°

Physical characteristics
- Mean diameter: 4.36 km (derived); 4.4±0.6 km
- Synodic rotation period: 4.27333±0.00005 h 4.2735±0.0003 h (Note: Pravec (2011) web: lightcurve plot (6070) Rheinland with a rotation period 4.2735±0.0003 h hours and a brightness amplitude of 0.40±0.02 mag. Quality Code is 3. Summary figures at LCDB and Pravec, P.; Wolf, M.; Sarounova, L. (2011).); 4.27371±0.00005 h 4.2737137±0.0000005 h 4.273715±0.000003 h 4.287±0.0015 h 4.482±0.001 h
- Geometric albedo: 0.20±0.05
- Spectral type: S/Q · S (SDSS-MFB) (Note: Search for Unusual Spectroscopic Candidates Among 40313 minor planets from the 3rd Release of the Sloan Digital Sky Survey Moving Object Catalog (publication). SDSS-MFB (Masi Foglia Binzel) taxonomy (catalog).); V–R = 0.490±0.050
- Absolute magnitude (H): 13.67±0.02 (R); 13.68±0.02 (R); 13.8; 14.07±0.19; 14.17; 14.17±0.054; 14.17±0.07; 14.342±0.006 (S)

6070 Rheinland (prov. designation: 1991 XO_{1}) is an asteroid located in the inner region of the asteroid belt, approximately 4.4 kilometers (2.7 miles) in diameter. It was discovered on 10 December 1991, by German astronomer Freimut Börngen at the Karl Schwarzschild Observatory in Tautenburg, Germany. The asteroid was named after the Rhineland, a region in western Germany. The stony asteroid has a rotation period of 4.27 hours.

== Orbit and classification ==
Rheinland orbits the Sun in the inner main-belt at a distance of 1.9–2.9 AU once every 3 years and 8 months (1,347 days; semi-major axis of 2.39 AU). Its orbit has an eccentricity of 0.21 and an inclination of 3° with respect to the ecliptic. Rheinland is a member of the Nysa–Polana complex, a collection of overlapping asteroid families in the inner main belt. The asteroid was first observed as 1950 TW_{1} at Heidelberg Observatory in October 1950. The body's observation arc begins with a precovery taken at the Palomar Observatory in March 1956, more than 35 years prior to its official discovery observation at Tautenburg.

== Naming ==
This minor planet was named after the Rhineland, a region in western Germany. The official naming citation was published by the Minor Planet Center on 17 March 1995 (M.P.C. 24919).

== Physical characteristics ==
Rheinland has been characterized as an S- and Q-type asteroid by Pan-STARRS' photometric survey. It is also characterized as a stony S-type asteroid in the SDSS–MFB taxonomy (Masi Foglia Binzel).

=== Rotation period and poles ===
Several rotational lightcurves of Rheinland have been obtained from photometric observations since 2009. Analysis of the best-rated lightcurve gave a rotation period of 4.27333 hours with a consolidated brightness amplitude between 0.40 and 0.58 magnitude (U=3).

Published in 2014, a modeled lightcurve gave a period 4.273715 hours, as well as a two spin axes of (110.0°, −60.0°) and (290°, −60.0°) in ecliptic coordinates (λ, β). In 2017, modelling gave a period of 4.2737137 h and a single spin axis of (124°, −87.0°), refining a previously published result of 4.27371 h and (4°, −76.0°).

=== Diameter and albedo ===
According to a detailed study published in 2017, Rheinland measures 4.4 kilometers in diameter and its surface has an albedo of 0.20, while the Collaborative Asteroid Lightcurve Link also assumes an albedo of 0.20 and derives a similar diameter of 4.36 kilometers based on an absolute magnitude of 14.17.

== Asteroid pair ==
Rheinland forms an asteroid pair with asteroid (54827) 2001 NQ_{8}, a newly found class of two unbound bodies on nearly identical orbits around the Sun. Asteroid pairs have not been studied in detail yet. In the past, the members of a pair (or cluster if more than two members) had very small relative velocities and may have been a binary asteroid until they became gravitationally unbound and continued on separate orbits. Other asteroid pairs may have resulted from a collisional breakup of a parent body similar to the process that formed the asteroid families.

It is thought that this pair was created due to rotational fission (YORP effect) some 16340±40 years ago. The other body of this pair, 2001 NQ_{8}, has a diameter of approximately 2.09 kilometers, an albedo of 0.213, and is an assumed Q-type asteroid.
