= Freimut Börngen =

German astronomer (1930–2021)

Minor planets discovered: 538
see § List of discovered minor planets

Freimut Börngen (German: [ˈfʁaɪmuːt ˈbœʁŋən]; 17 October 1930 – 19 June 2021) was a German astronomer and a prolific discoverer of minor planets. A few sources give his first name wrongly as "Freimuth". The Minor Planet Center credits him as F. Borngen.

He studied galaxies with the Schmidt telescope at the Karl Schwarzschild Observatory in Tautenburg, Germany. In 1995 he retired, but continued to work as a freelancer for the observatory. As a by-product of his work, he discovered numerous asteroids (519, as of July 2006). The research on asteroids had to be done in his spare time, as the search for small objects was not considered prestigious enough by the GDR research managers. During the GDR regime, Börngen restricted himself to politically neutral names for his asteroids, such as topics related to Thuringia or famous scientists and composers. Examples include 2424 Tautenburg, 3181 Ahnert, 3245 Jensch, or 3941 Haydn. After the German reunification, he chose systematically historical, cultural, scientific and geographical namings, and at times honored amateur astronomers. Other names include references to resistance fighters against the Nazi suppression, or document a religious interest.

Freimut Börngen achieved great reputation in the international scientific community for his human qualities and the well-substantiated choice of names. In 2006, he was awarded the Bundesverdienstkreuz am Bande (Cross of Merit on ribbon) by German Federal President Horst Köhler.

The main-belt asteroid 3859 Börngen, discovered by astronomer Edward Bowell at the U.S. Anderson Mesa Station in 1987, was named in his honor. The naming and its citation was proposed and written by his colleague Lutz Schmadel, and published on 20 February 1989 (M.P.C. 14207).

Freimut Börngen died on 19 June 2021 at the age of 90.

== List of discovered minor planets ==
Freimut Börngen is credited by the Minor Planet Center with the discovery of 538 numbered minor planets made between 1961 and 1995.

- 2424 Tautenburg - 27 October 1973^{[A]}
- 2861 Lambrecht - 3 November 1981^{[A]}
- 3181 Ahnert - 8 March 1964
- 3245 Jensch - 27 October 1973
- 3338 Richter - 28 October 1973
- 3499 Hoppe - 3 November 1981^{[A]}
- 3539 Weimar - 11 April 1967
- 3540 Protesilaos - 27 October 1973
- 3802 Dornburg - 7 August 1986
- 3808 Tempel - 24 March 1982
- 3826 Handel - 27 October 1973
- 3917 Franz Schubert - 15 February 1961
- 3941 Haydn - 27 October 1973
- 3943 Silbermann - 3 September 1981
- 3954 Mendelssohn - 24 April 1987
- 3955 Bruckner - 9 September 1988
- 3975 Verdi - 19 October 1982
- 3992 Wagner - 29 September 1987
- 4003 Schumann - 8 March 1964
- 4076 Dörffel - 19 October 1982
- 4098 Thraen - 26 November 1987
- 4117 Wilke - 24 September 1982
- 4134 Schütz - 15 February 1961
- 4246 Telemann - 24 September 1982
- 4330 Vivaldi - 19 October 1982
- 4347 Reger - 13 August 1988
- 4382 Stravinsky - 29 November 1989
- 4406 Mahler - 22 December 1987
- 4559 Strauss - 11 January 1989
- 4579 Puccini - 11 January 1989
- 4727 Ravel - 24 October 1979
- 4734 Rameau - 19 October 1982
- 4802 Khatchaturian - 23 October 1989
- 4850 Palestrina - 27 October 1973
- 4872 Grieg - 25 December 1989
- 4889 Praetorius - 19 October 1982
- 4972 Pachelbel - 23 October 1989
- 5004 Bruch - 8 September 1988
- 5039 Rosenkavalier - 11 April 1967
- 5063 Monteverdi - 2 February 1989
- 5157 Hindemith - 27 October 1973
- 5177 Hugowolf - 10 January 1989
- 5210 Saint-Saëns - 7 March 1989
- 5224 Abbe - 21 February 1982
- 5312 Schott - 3 November 1981
- 5375 Siedentopf - 11 January 1989
- 5409 Saale - 30 September 1962
- 5478 Wartburg - 23 October 1989
- 5509 Rennsteig - 8 September 1988
- 5616 Vogtland - 29 September 1987
- 5628 Preussen - 13 September 1991^{[B]}
- 5689 Rhön - 9 September 1991^{[B]}
- 5792 Unstrut - 18 January 1964
- 5816 Potsdam - 11 January 1989
- 5820 Babelsberg - 23 October 1989
- 5835 Mainfranken - 21 September 1992
- 5846 Hessen - 11 January 1989
- 5866 Sachsen - 13 August 1988
- 5904 Württemberg - 10 January 1989
- 6044 Hammer-Purgstall - 13 September 1991^{[B]}
- 6068 Brandenburg - 10 October 1990^{[B]}
- 6070 Rheinland - 10 December 1991
- 6099 Saarland - 30 October 1991
- 6120 Anhalt - 21 August 1987
- 6124 Mecklenburg - 29 September 1987
- 6157 Prey - 9 September 1991^{[B]}
- 6209 Schwaben - 12 October 1990^{[B]}
- 6293 Oberpfalz - 26 November 1987
- 6305 Helgoland - 6 April 1989
- 6320 Bremen - 15 January 1991
- 6332 Vorarlberg - 30 March 1992
- 6396 Schleswig - 15 January 1991
- 6402 Holstein - 9 April 1991
- 6439 Tirol - 13 February 1988
- 6442 Salzburg - 8 September 1988
- 6451 Kärnten - 9 April 1991
- 6457 Kremsmünster - 2 September 1992^{[B]}
- 6482 Steiermark - 10 January 1989
- 6488 Drebach - 10 April 1991
- 6563 Steinheim - 11 December 1991
- 6653 Feininger - 10 December 1991
- 6717 Antal - 10 October 1990^{[B]}
- 6718 Beiglböck - 14 October 1990^{[B]}
- 6776 Dix - 6 April 1989
- 6864 Starkenburg - 12 September 1991^{[B]}
- 6966 Vietoris - 13 September 1991^{[B]}
- 7054 Brehm - 6 April 1989
- 7117 Claudius - 14 February 1988
- 7121 Busch - 10 January 1989
- 7127 Stifter - 9 September 1991^{[B]}
- 7130 Klepper - 30 April 1992
- 7256 Bonhoeffer - 11 November 1993
- 7280 Bergengruen - 8 September 1988
- 7414 Bosch - 13 October 1990^{[B]}
- 7571 Weisse Rose - 7 March 1989
- 7580 Schwabhausen - 13 October 1990^{[B]}
- 7583 Rosegger - 17 January 1991
- 7584 Ossietzky - 9 April 1991
- 7586 Bismarck - 13 September 1991^{[B]}
- 7655 Adamries - 28 December 1991
- 7698 Schweitzer - 11 January 1989
- 7700 Rote Kapelle - 13 October 1990^{[B]}
- 7767 Tomatic - 13 September 1991^{[B]}
- 7873 Böll - 15 January 1991
- 7945 Kreisau - 13 September 1991^{[B]}
- 8019 Karachkina - 14 October 1990^{[B]}
- 8020 Erzgebirge - 14 October 1990^{[B]}
- 8089 Yukar - 13 October 1990^{[B]}
- 8108 Wieland - 30 January 1995
- 8130 Seeberg - 27 February 1976
- 8158 Herder - 23 October 1989
- 8171 Stauffenberg - 5 September 1991^{[B]}
- 8268 Goerdeler - 29 September 1987
- 8282 Delp - 10 September 1991
- 8284 Cranach - 8 October 1991
- 8381 Hauptmann - 21 September 1992
- 8382 Mann - 23 September 1992
- 8501 Wachholz - 13 October 1990^{[B]}
- 8502 Bauhaus - 14 October 1990^{[B]}
- 8661 Ratzinger - 14 October 1990^{[B]}
- 8666 Reuter - 9 April 1991
- 8667 Fontane - 9 April 1991
- 8684 Reichwein - 30 March 1992
- 8827 Kollwitz - 13 August 1988
- 8831 Brändström - 2 February 1989
- 8847 Huch - 12 October 1990^{[B]}
- 8853 Gerdlehmann - 9 April 1991
- 8860 Rohloff - 5 October 1991^{[B]}
- 8861 Jenskandler - 3 October 1991^{[B]}
- 9052 Uhland - 30 October 1991
- 9187 Walterkröll - 12 September 1991^{[B]}
- 9189 Hölderlin - 10 September 1991
- 9204 Mörike - 4 August 1994
- 9307 Regiomontanus - 21 August 1987
- 9315 Weigel - 13 August 1988
- 9322 Lindenau - 10 January 1989
- 9336 Altenburg - 15 January 1991
- 9344 Klopstock - 12 September 1991^{[B]}
- 9351 Neumayer - 2 October 1991^{[B]}
- 9413 Eichendorff - 21 September 1995
- 9577 Gropius - 2 February 1989
- 9610 Vischer - 2 September 1992^{[B]}
- 9645 Grünewald - 5 January 1995
- 9742 Worpswede - 26 November 1987
- 9761 Krautter - 13 September 1991^{[B]}
- 9762 Hermannhesse - 13 September 1991^{[B]}
- 9764 Morgenstern - 30 October 1991
- 9833 Rilke - 21 February 1982
- 9854 Karlheinz - 15 January 1991
- 9861 Jahreiss - 9 September 1991^{[B]}
- 9863 Reichardt - 13 September 1991^{[B]}
- 9872 Solf - 27 February 1992
- 9956 Castellaz - 5 October 1991^{[B]}
- 9957 Raffaellosanti - 6 October 1991
- 9962 Pfau - 28 December 1991
- 10055 Silcher - 22 December 1987
- 10067 Bertuch - 11 January 1989
- 10095 Carlloewe - 9 September 1991^{[B]}
- 10100 Bürgel - 10 December 1991
- 10114 Greifswald - 4 September 1992^{[B]}
- 10116 Robertfranz - 21 September 1992^{[B]}
- 10331 Peterbluhm - 9 April 1991
- 10340 Jostjahn - 10 September 1991
- 10348 Poelchau - 29 April 1992
- 10543 Klee - 27 February 1992
- 10740 Fallersleben - 8 September 1988
- 10745 Arnstadt - 11 January 1989
- 10746 Mühlhausen - 10 February 1989
- 10747 Köthen - 1 February 1989
- 10749 Musäus - 6 April 1989
- 10753 van de Velde - 28 November 1989
- 10761 Lyubimets - 12 October 1990^{[B]}
- 10762 von Laue - 12 October 1990^{[B]}
- 10763 Hlawka - 12 October 1990^{[B]}
- 10764 Rübezahl - 12 October 1990^{[B]}
- 10774 Eisenach - 15 January 1991
- 10775 Leipzig - 15 January 1991
- 10778 Marcks - 9 April 1991
- 10781 Ritter - 6 August 1991
- 10782 Hittmair - 12 September 1991^{[B]}
- 10786 Robertmayer - 7 October 1991^{[B]}
- 10787 Ottoburkard - 4 October 1991^{[B]}
- 10801 Lüneburg - 23 September 1992
- 10825 Augusthermann - 18 September 1993
- 10835 Fröbel - 12 November 1993
- 10839 Hufeland - 3 April 1994
- 10847 Koch - 5 January 1995
- 10856 Bechstein - 4 March 1995
- 10857 Blüthner - 5 March 1995
- 11037 Distler - 2 February 1989
- 11043 Pepping - 25 December 1989
- 11050 Messiaën - 13 October 1990^{[B]}
- 11061 Lagerlöf - 10 September 1991
- 11075 Dönhoff - 23 September 1992
- 11313 Kügelgen - 3 April 1994
- 11485 Zinzendorf - 8 September 1988
- 11496 Grass - 10 January 1989
- 11508 Stolte - 12 October 1990^{[B]}
- 11537 Guericke - 29 April 1992
- 11547 Griesser - 31 October 1992
- 11573 Helmholtz - 20 September 1993^{[B]}
- 11588 Gottfriedkeller - 28 October 1994
- 11847 Winckelmann - 20 January 1988
- 11853 Runge - 7 September 1988
- 11854 Ludwigrichter - 8 September 1988
- 11855 Preller - 8 September 1988
- 11886 Kraske - 10 October 1990^{[B]}
- 11887 Echemmon - 14 October 1990^{[B]}
- 11899 Weill - 9 April 1991
- 11916 Wiesloch - 24 September 1992^{[B]}
- 12182 Storm - 27 October 1973
- 12240 Droste-Hülshoff - 13 August 1988
- 12241 Lefort - 13 August 1988
- 12244 Werfel - 8 September 1988
- 12298 Brecht - 6 August 1991
- 12318 Kästner - 30 April 1992
- 12323 Haeckel - 4 September 1992^{[B]}
- 12327 Terbrüggen - 21 September 1992^{[B]}
- 12329 Liebermann - 23 September 1992
- 12350 Feuchtwanger - 23 April 1993
- 12401 Tucholsky - 21 July 1995
- 12659 Schlegel - 27 October 1973
- 12661 Schelling - 27 February 1976
- 12694 Schleiermacher - 7 March 1989
- 12729 Berger - 13 September 1991^{[B]}
- 12782 Mauersberger - 5 March 1995
- 13024 Conradferdinand - 11 January 1989
- 13055 Kreppein - 14 October 1990^{[B]}
- 13084 Virchow - 2 April 1992
- 13086 Sauerbruch - 30 April 1992
- 13092 Schrödinger - 24 September 1992^{[B]}
- 13093 Wolfgangpauli - 21 September 1992
- 13149 Heisenberg - 4 March 1995
- 13478 Fraunhofer - 27 February 1976
- 13530 Ninnemann - 9 September 1991^{[B]}
- 13531 Weizsäcker - 13 September 1991^{[B]}
- 13559 Werth - 4 September 1992^{[B]}
- 13610 Lilienthal - 5 October 1994
- 13954 Born - 13 October 1990^{[B]}
- 13977 Frisch - 29 April 1992
- 14014 Münchhausen - 14 January 1994
- 14025 Fallada - 2 September 1994
- 14041 Dürrenmatt - 21 September 1995
- 14365 Jeanpaul - 8 September 1988
- 14366 Wilhelmraabe - 8 September 1988
- 14367 Hippokrates - 8 September 1988
- 14372 Paulgerhardt - 9 January 1989
- 14412 Wolflojewski - 9 September 1991^{[B]}
- 14413 Geiger - 5 September 1991^{[B]}
- 14836 Maxfrisch - 14 February 1988
- 14845 Hegel - 3 November 1988
- 14871 Pyramus - 13 October 1990^{[B]}
- 14940 Freiligrath - 4 March 1995
- 15262 Abderhalden - 12 October 1990^{[B]}
- 15263 Erwingroten - 13 October 1990^{[B]}
- 15264 Delbrück - 11 October 1990^{[B]}
- 15265 Ernsting - 12 October 1990^{[B]}
- 15282 Franzmarc - 13 September 1991^{[B]}
- 15301 Marutesser - 21 September 1992^{[B]}
- 15342 Assisi - 3 April 1994
- 15346 Bonifatius - 2 September 1994
- 15710 Böcklin - 11 January 1989
- 15724 Zille - 12 October 1990^{[B]}
- 15727 Ianmorison - 10 October 1990^{[B]}
- 15728 Karlmay - 11 October 1990^{[B]}
- 15761 Schumi - 24 September 1992^{[B]}
- 15762 Rühmann - 21 September 1992
- 15808 Zelter - 3 April 1994
- 15811 Nüsslein-Volhard - 10 July 1994
- 16355 Buber - 29 October 1975
- 16398 Hummel - 24 September 1982
- 16418 Lortzing - 29 September 1987
- 16438 Knöfel - 11 January 1989
- 16441 Kirchner - 7 March 1989
- 16459 Barth - 28 November 1989
- 16505 Sulzer - 12 October 1990^{[B]}
- 16522 Tell - 15 January 1991
- 16524 Hausmann - 17 January 1991
- 16544 Hochlehnert - 9 September 1991^{[B]}
- 16590 Brunowalter - 21 September 1992^{[B]}
- 16705 Reinhardt - 4 March 1995
- 16714 Arndt - 21 September 1995
- 17458 Dick - 13 October 1990^{[B]}
- 17459 Andreashofer - 13 October 1990^{[B]}
- 17460 Mang - 10 October 1990^{[B]}
- 17484 Ganghofer - 13 September 1991^{[B]}
- 17486 Hodler - 10 September 1991
- 17488 Mantl - 2 October 1991^{[B]}
- 17489 Trenker - 2 October 1991^{[B]}
- 17492 Hippasos - 10 December 1991
- 17496 Augustinus - 29 February 1992
- 17579 Lewkopelew - 5 October 1994
- 17597 Stefanzweig - 4 March 1995
- 18286 Kneipp - 27 October 1973
- 18359 Jakobstaude - 13 October 1990^{[B]}
- 18360 Sachs - 10 October 1990^{[B]}
- 18395 Schmiedmayer - 21 September 1992^{[B]}
- 18396 Nellysachs - 21 September 1992^{[B]}
- 18398 Bregenz - 23 September 1992
- 18430 Balzac - 14 January 1994
- 18458 Caesar - 5 March 1995
- 19126 Ottohahn - 22 August 1987
- 19136 Strassmann - 10 January 1989
- 19139 Apian - 6 April 1989
- 19162 Wambsganss - 10 October 1990^{[B]}
- 19178 Walterbothe - 9 September 1991^{[B]}
- 19182 Pitz - 7 October 1991^{[B]}
- 19183 Amati - 5 October 1991^{[B]}
- 19185 Guarneri - 4 October 1991
- 19189 Stradivari - 28 December 1991
- 19208 Starrfield - 2 September 1992^{[B]}
- 19263 Lavater - 21 July 1995
- 19914 Klagenfurt - 27 October 1973
- 19970 Johannpeter - 8 September 1988
- 19992 Schönbein - 10 October 1990^{[B]}
- 19993 Gunterseeber - 10 October 1990^{[B]}
- 20006 Albertus Magnus - 11 April 1991
- 20012 Ranke - 13 September 1991^{[B]}
- 20016 Rietschel - 8 October 1991
- 20074 Laskerschueler - 14 January 1994
- 21010 Kishon - 13 August 1988
- 21050 Beck - 10 October 1990^{[B]}
- 21059 Penderecki - 9 April 1991
- 21074 Rügen - 12 September 1991^{[B]}
- 21075 Heussinger - 12 September 1991^{[B]}
- 21076 Kokoschka - 12 September 1991^{[B]}
- 21109 Sünkel - 4 September 1992^{[B]}
- 21110 Karlvalentin - 4 September 1992^{[B]}
- 21118 Hezimmermann - 24 September 1992^{[B]}
- 21125 Orff - 30 December 1992
- 22291 Heitifer - 2 February 1989
- 22322 Bodensee - 13 September 1991^{[B]}
- 22348 Schmeidler - 24 September 1992^{[B]}
- 22354 Sposetti - 31 October 1992
- 22369 Klinger - 18 September 1993^{[B]}
- 23472 Rolfriekher - 10 October 1990^{[B]}
- 23473 Voss - 11 October 1990^{[B]}
- 23490 Monikohl - 12 September 1991^{[B]}
- 23514 Schneider - 2 September 1992^{[B]}
- 23520 Ludwigbechstein - 23 September 1992
- 23578 Baedeker - 22 February 1995
- 24665 Tolerantia - 8 September 1988
- 24666 Miesvanrohe - 8 September 1988
- 24671 Frankmartin - 10 January 1989
- 24699 Schwekendiek - 13 October 1990^{[B]}
- 24711 Chamisso - 6 August 1991
- 24712 Boltzmann - 12 September 1991^{[B]}
- 24713 Ekrutt - 12 September 1991^{[B]}
- 24748 Nernst - 26 September 1992^{[B]}
- 24749 Grebel - 24 September 1992^{[B]}
- 24750 Ohm - 24 September 1992^{[B]}
- 24751 Kroemer - 21 September 1992
- 26119 Duden - 7 October 1991
- 26821 Baehr - 17 March 1988
- 26842 Hefele - 2 October 1991^{[B]}
- 27710 Henseling - 7 September 1988
- 27712 Coudray - 3 November 1988
- 27758 Michelson - 12 September 1991^{[B]}
- 27764 von Flüe - 10 September 1991
- 27765 Brockhaus - 10 September 1991
- 27845 Josephmeyer - 5 October 1994
- 27846 Honegger - 5 October 1994
- 27864 Antongraff - 5 March 1995
- 29185 Reich - 13 October 1990^{[B]}
- 29197 Gleim - 15 January 1991
- 29203 Schnitger - 9 April 1991
- 29204 Ladegast - 11 April 1991
- 29208 Halorentz - 9 September 1991^{[B]}
- 29212 Zeeman - 10 September 1991
- 29214 Apitzsch - 2 October 1991^{[B]}
- 29227 Wegener - 29 February 1992
- 29246 Clausius - 2 September 1992^{[B]}
- 29250 Helmutmoritz - 24 September 1992^{[B]}
- 29329 Knobelsdorff - 5 October 1994
- 30778 Döblin - 29 September 1987
- 30788 Angekauffmann - 8 September 1988
- 30798 Graubünden - 2 February 1989
- 30826 Coulomb - 10 October 1990^{[B]}
- 30827 Lautenschläger - 10 October 1990^{[B]}
- 30828 Bethe - 12 October 1990^{[B]}
- 30829 Wolfwacker - 10 October 1990^{[B]}
- 30830 Jahn - 14 October 1990^{[B]}
- 30836 Schnittke - 15 January 1991
- 30837 Steinheil - 15 January 1991
- 30847 Lampert - 13 September 1991^{[B]}
- 30850 Vonsiemens - 7 October 1991^{[B]}
- 30851 Reißfelder - 2 October 1991^{[B]}
- 30852 Debye - 2 October 1991^{[B]}
- 30882 Tomhenning - 21 September 1992^{[B]}
- 30883 de Broglie - 24 September 1992^{[B]}
- 30933 Grillparzer - 17 October 1993
- 32808 Bischoff - 10 October 1990^{[B]}
- 32809 Sommerfeld - 10 October 1990^{[B]}
- 32810 Steinbach - 10 October 1990^{[B]}
- 32811 Apisaon - 14 October 1990^{[B]}
- 32821 Posch - 9 September 1991^{[B]}
- 32853 Döbereiner - 21 September 1992^{[B]}
- 32855 Zollitsch - 24 September 1992^{[B]}
- 32899 Knigge - 4 August 1994
- 35229 Benckert - 24 March 1995
- 37573 Enricocaruso - 23 October 1989
- 37582 Faraday - 12 October 1990^{[B]}
- 37583 Ramonkhanna - 13 October 1990^{[B]}
- 37584 Schleiden - 10 October 1990^{[B]}
- 37592 Pauljackson - 3 October 1991^{[B]}
- 37608 Löns - 24 September 1992^{[B]}
- 39464 Pöppelmann - 27 October 1973
- 39536 Lenhof - 10 October 1990^{[B]}
- 39540 Borchert - 11 April 1991
- 39549 Casals - 27 February 1992
- 39571 Pückler - 21 September 1992
- 42482 Fischer-Dieskau - 8 September 1988
- 42487 Ångström - 9 September 1991^{[B]}
- 42492 Brüggenthies - 3 October 1991^{[B]}
- 42516 Oistrach - 11 November 1993
- 43724 Pechstein - 29 October 1975
- 43751 Asam - 19 October 1982
- 43775 Tiepolo - 2 February 1989
- 43790 Ferdinandbraun - 12 October 1990^{[B]}
- 43804 Peterting - 10 September 1991^{[B]}
- 43806 Augustepiccard - 13 September 1991^{[B]}
- 43813 Kühner - 7 October 1991^{[B]}
- 46563 Oken - 12 September 1991^{[B]}
- 48415 Dehio - 21 August 1987
- 48422 Schrade - 3 November 1988
- 48425 Tischendorf - 2 February 1989
- 48434 Maxbeckmann - 23 October 1989
- 48435 Jaspers - 23 October 1989
- 48447 Hingley - 10 October 1990^{[B]}
- 48456 Wilhelmwien - 12 September 1991^{[B]}
- 48457 Joseffried - 12 September 1991^{[B]}
- 48458 Merian - 13 September 1991^{[B]}
- 48471 Orchiston - 7 October 1991^{[B]}
- 48472 Mössbauer - 2 October 1991^{[B]}
- 48480 Falk - 28 December 1991
- 48492 Utewielen - 24 September 1992^{[B]}
- 48588 Raschröder - 2 September 1994
- 52271 Lecorbusier - 8 September 1988
- 52291 Mott - 10 October 1990^{[B]}
- 52292 Kamdzhalov - 10 October 1990^{[B]}
- 52293 Mommsen - 12 October 1990^{[B]}
- 52294 Detlef - 12 October 1990^{[B]}
- 52301 Qumran - 9 September 1991^{[B]}
- 52308 Hanspeterröser - 7 October 1991^{[B]}
- 52309 Philnicolai - 7 October 1991
- 52334 Oberammergau - 30 March 1992
- 52337 Compton - 2 September 1992^{[B]}
- 52341 Ballmann - 21 September 1992^{[B]}
- 55733 Lepsius - 27 November 1986
- 55735 Magdeburg - 22 August 1987
- 55749 Eulenspiegel - 15 January 1991
- 55753 Raman - 13 September 1991^{[B]}
- 55759 Erdmannsdorff - 10 December 1991
- 55772 Loder - 30 December 1992
- 58152 Natsöderblom - 12 August 1988
- 58163 Minnesang - 23 October 1989
- 58186 Langkavel - 13 September 1991^{[B]}
- 58191 Dolomiten - 28 December 1991
- 58215 von Klitzing - 21 September 1992^{[B]}
- 58217 Peterhebel - 24 September 1992^{[B]}
- 65675 Mohr-Gruber - 11 January 1989
- 65685 Behring - 10 October 1990^{[B]}
- 65692 Trifu - 12 September 1991^{[B]}
- 65694 Franzrosenzweig - 10 September 1991
- 65708 Ehrlich - 4 September 1992^{[B]}
- 65712 Schneidmüller - 24 September 1992^{[B]}
- 65769 Mahalia - 4 March 1995
- 69264 Nebra - 14 August 1988
- 69275 Wiesenthal - 28 November 1989
- 69286 von Liebig - 10 October 1990^{[B]}
- 69287 Günthereichhorn - 10 October 1990^{[B]}
- 69288 Berlioz - 11 October 1990^{[B]}
- 69295 Stecklum - 2 October 1991^{[B]}
- 69312 Rogerbacon - 24 September 1992^{[B]}
- 73686 Nussdorf - 10 October 1990^{[B]}
- 73687 Thomas Aquinas - 10 October 1990^{[B]}
- 73692 Gürtler - 12 September 1991^{[B]}
- 73693 Dorschner - 12 September 1991^{[B]}
- 73699 Landaupfalz - 4 October 1991^{[B]}
- 73700 von Kues - 5 October 1991^{[B]}
- 73701 Siegfriedbauer - 3 October 1991^{[B]}
- 79087 Scheidt - 17 October 1977
- 79129 Robkoldewey - 11 October 1990^{[B]}
- 79138 Mansfeld - 13 September 1991^{[B]}
- 85179 Meistereckhart - 11 October 1990^{[B]}
- 85190 Birgitroth - 12 September 1991^{[B]}
- 85195 von Helfta - 7 October 1991^{[B]}
- 85196 Halle - 4 October 1991^{[B]}
- 85197 Ginkgo - 5 October 1991^{[B]}
- 85198 Weltenburg - 2 October 1991^{[B]}
- 85199 Habsburg - 3 October 1991^{[B]}
- 85214 Sommersdorf - 21 September 1992^{[B]}
- 85215 Hohenzollern - 26 September 1992^{[B]}
- 85216 Schein - 24 September 1992^{[B]}
- 85217 Bilzingsleben - 31 October 1992
- 85299 Neander - 5 October 1994
- 85317 Lehár - 30 January 1995
- 85320 Bertram - 4 March 1995
- 90703 Indulgentia - 8 September 1988
- 90709 Wettin - 12 October 1990^{[B]}
- 90711 Stotternheim - 10 October 1990^{[B]}
- 90712 Wittelsbach - 12 October 1990^{[B]}
- 90718 Castel Gandolfo 12 September 1991^{[B]}
- 96205 Ararat - 24 September 1992^{[B]}
- 96206 Eschenberg - 24 September 1992^{[B]}
- 100019 Gregorianik - 23 October 1989
- 100027 Hannaharendt - 12 October 1990^{[B]}
- 100028 von Canstein - 10 October 1990^{[B]}
- 100029 Varnhagen - 10 October 1990^{[B]}
- 100033 Taizé - 9 April 1991
- 100046 Worms - 2 October 1991^{[B]}
- 100047 Leobaeck - 2 October 1991^{[B]}
- (100084) 1992 SY_{13} - 26 September 1992^{[B]}
- 100268 Rosenthal - 5 October 1994
- 118173 Barmen - 11 April 1991
- 118178 Rinckart - 23 September 1992
- 120460 Hambach - 13 October 1990^{[B]}
- 120461 Gandhi - 10 October 1990^{[B]}
- 120481 Johannwalter - 24 September 1992^{[B]}
- 134348 Klemperer - 31 October 1992
- 150118 Petersberg - 18 September 1993^{[B]}
- 152559 Bodelschwingh - 12 October 1990^{[B]}
- (160018) 1991 TY_{2} - 7 October 1991^{[B]}
- 160512 Franck-Hertz - 11 October 1990^{[B]}
- (160513) 1990 TD_{13} - 12 October 1990^{[B]}
- 162001 Vulpius - 10 October 1990^{[B]}
- (162002) 1990 TC_{10} - 10 October 1990^{[B]}
- 168321 Josephschmidt - 12 September 1991^{[B]}
- (173120) 1990 TL_{9} - 10 October 1990^{[B]}
- 178294 Wertheimer - 11 October 1990^{[B]}
- 190283 Schielicke - 12 September 1991^{[B]}
- 192293 Dominikbrunner - 10 October 1990^{[B]}
- (204967) 1991 TH_{7} - 3 October 1991^{[B]}
- 279723 Wittenberg - 12 September 1991^{[B]}
- (282028) 1990 TV_{9} - 10 October 1990^{[B]}
- 322510 Heinrichgrüber - 10 October 1990^{[B]}
- 350178 Eisleben - 30 March 1992
- (373394) 1990 TQ_{9} - 10 October 1990^{[B]}

Co-discovery made with:

- ^{A} K. Kirsch
- ^{B} L. D. Schmadel
