= 11573 Helmholtz =

Main-belt asteroid

Discovery
- Discovered by: F. Börngen; L. D. Schmadel
- Discovery site: Karl Schwarzschild Obs.
- Discovery date: 20 September 1993

Designations
- Named after: Hermann von Helmholtz (German naturalist)
- Alternative designations: 1993 SK_{3} · 1982 YN_{4}
- Minor planet category: main-belt · (outer) background · Zhongguo

Orbital characteristics
- Epoch 23 March 2018 (JD 2458200.5)
- Uncertainty parameter 0
- Observation arc: 34.92 yr (12,755 d)
- Aphelion: 4.1213 AU
- Perihelion: 2.3952 AU
- Semi-major axis: 3.2582 AU
- Eccentricity: 0.2649
- Orbital period (sidereal): 5.88 yr (2,148 d)
- Mean anomaly: 21.116°
- Mean motion: 0° 10^{m} 3.36^{s} / day
- Inclination: 2.2499°
- Longitude of ascending node: 310.61°
- Argument of perihelion: 127.67°

Physical characteristics
- Mean diameter: 13 km (est. at 0.057)
- Absolute magnitude (H): 13.2

11573 Helmholtz, provisional designation 1993 SK_{3}, is a Zhongguo asteroid from the outermost region of the asteroid belt, approximately 13 kilometers (8 miles) in diameter. It was discovered on 20 September 1993, by German astronomers Freimut Börngen and Lutz Schmadel at the Karl Schwarzschild Observatory in Tautenburg, Germany. It is one of few asteroids located in the 2:1 resonance with Jupiter. The asteroid was named for German physicist Hermann von Helmholtz.

== Orbit and classification ==
Helmholtz is a non-family asteroid from the main belt's background population. It is a member of the small group of Zhongguo asteroids, located in the Hecuba gap (2:1 mean motion resonance with Jupiter) near 3.27 AU. Contrary to the nearby unstable Griqua group, the orbits of the Zhongguos are stable over half a billion years.

It orbits the Sun in the outer main-belt at a distance of 2.4–4.1 AU once every 5 years and 11 months (2,148 days; semi-major axis of 3.26 AU). Its orbit has an eccentricity of 0.26 and an inclination of 2° with respect to the ecliptic. The asteroid was first observed as 1982 YN_{4} at Crimea–Nauchnij in December 1982. The body's observation arc begins at Palomar Observatory in January 1989.

== Physical characteristics ==
=== Diameter and albedo ===
Based on a generic magnitude-to-diameter conversion, Helmholtz measures 13 kilometer in diameter for an absolute magnitude of 13.2 and an assumed albedo of 0.057, which is typical for carbonaceous asteroids. If the body was of stony rather than carbonaceous composition, its estimated diameter would be less than 7 kilometer.

=== Rotation period ===
As of 2018, no rotational lightcurve of Helmholtz has been obtained from photometric observations. The body's rotation period, pole and shape remain unknown.

== Naming ==
This minor planet was named after German physiologist and physicist Hermann von Helmholtz (1821–1894), a prolific naturalists of the 19th century. The official naming citation was published by the Minor Planet Center on 20 March 2000 (M.P.C. 39658). The lunar crater Helmholtz as well as the crater Helmholtz on Mars are also named in his honor.
