= 15811 Nüsslein-Volhard =

Asteroid

Discovery
- Discovered by: F. Börngen
- Discovery site: Karl Schwarzschild Obs.
- Discovery date: 10 July 1994

Designations
- Named after: Christiane Nüsslein-Volhard (biologist, Nobelist)
- Alternative designations: 1994 ND_{1} · 1955 SX_{1} 1988 PY_{2} · 1989 SG_{7}
- Minor planet category: main-belt · (outer) background

Orbital characteristics
- Epoch 4 September 2017 (JD 2458000.5)
- Uncertainty parameter 0
- Observation arc: 60.87 yr (22,232 days)
- Aphelion: 3.7344 AU
- Perihelion: 2.6737 AU
- Semi-major axis: 3.2041 AU
- Eccentricity: 0.1655
- Orbital period (sidereal): 5.74 yr (2,095 days)
- Mean anomaly: 0.3974°
- Mean motion: 0° 10^{m} 18.84^{s} / day
- Inclination: 9.6131°
- Longitude of ascending node: 225.54°
- Argument of perihelion: 74.845°

Physical characteristics
- Dimensions: 15.520±0.133; 16.17±1.4 km (IRAS:2)
- Geometric albedo: 0.0617±0.013 (IRAS:2); 0.067±0.007
- Absolute magnitude (H): 12.8

15811 Nüsslein-Volhard, provisional designation 1994 ND_{1}, is a dark background asteroid from the outer region of the asteroid belt, approximately 16 kilometers in diameter. It was discovered on 10 July 1994, by German astronomer Freimut Börngen at the Karl Schwarzschild Observatory in Tautenburg, Germany. It was named for Nobelist Christiane Nüsslein-Volhard.

== Orbit and classification ==
Nüsslein-Volhard orbits the Sun in the outer main-belt at a distance of 2.7–3.7 AU once every 5 years and 9 months (2,095 days). Its orbit has an eccentricity of 0.17 and an inclination of 10° with respect to the ecliptic.

The asteroid's observation arc begins 39 years prior to its official discovery observation, with its first identification as 1955 SX_{1} at the Goethe Link Observatory in September 1955.

== Physical characteristics ==
According to the observations made by the Infrared Astronomical Satellite IRAS and NASA's Wide-field Infrared Survey Explorer with its subsequent NEOWISE mission, Nüsslein-Volhard measures 15.2 and 16.2 kilometers in diameter, and its surface has an albedo of 0.062 and 0.067, respectively. A low albedo of 0.06 is typical for carbonaceous asteroids.

=== Lightcurve ===
As of 2017, Nüsslein-Volhard's actual composition, rotation period and shape remain unknown.

== Naming ==
This minor planet was named after Christiane Nüsslein-Volhard (born 1942), a German biologist who, together with Eric Wieschaus and Edward Lewis, won the Nobel Prize in Physiology or Medicine in 1995. Her research identified the genes controlling the embryonic development for the fruit fly Drosophila melanogaster. The approved naming citation was published by the Minor Planet Center on 26 May 2002 (M.P.C. 45748).
