= 14871 Pyramus =

Main-belt asteroid

Discovery
- Discovered by: L. D. Schmadel; F. Börngen
- Discovery site: Karl Schwarzschild Obs.
- Discovery date: 13 October 1990

Designations
- Named after: Pyramus (Classical mythology)
- Alternative designations: 1990 TH_{7} · 1972 TJ_{3} 1978 TW_{4}
- Minor planet category: main-belt · (outer) background · Zhongguo

Orbital characteristics
- Epoch 23 March 2018 (JD 2458200.5)
- Uncertainty parameter 0
- Observation arc: 62.73 yr (22,913 d)
- Aphelion: 4.0337 AU
- Perihelion: 2.5706 AU
- Semi-major axis: 3.3021 AU
- Eccentricity: 0.2215
- Orbital period (sidereal): 6.00 yr (2,192 d)
- Mean anomaly: 266.76°
- Mean motion: 0° 9^{m} 51.48^{s} / day
- Inclination: 0.9882°
- Longitude of ascending node: 5.9989°
- Argument of perihelion: 314.20°

Physical characteristics
- Mean diameter: 9 km (estimated at 0.06); 9.180±0.302
- Geometric albedo: 0.069±0.020
- Absolute magnitude (H): 13.9

14871 Pyramus (provisional designation 1990 TH_{7}) is a dark Zhongguo asteroid from the outermost region of the asteroid belt, approximately 9 kilometers (6 miles) in diameter. It was discovered on 13 October 1990 by German astronomers Lutz Schmadel and Freimut Börngen at the Karl Schwarzschild Observatory in Tautenburg, Germany. The asteroid was named for Pyramus from classical mythology.

== Orbit and classification ==
Pyramus is a non-family asteroid from the main belt's background population. It is a member of the small group of Zhongguo asteroids, located in the 2 : 1 mean motion resonance with the giant planet Jupiter. Contrary to the nearby unstable Griqua group, the orbits of the Zhongguos are stable over half a billion years.

It orbits the Sun in the outer main-belt at a distance of 2.6–4.0 AU once every 6.00 years (2,192 days; semi-major axis of 3.3 AU). Its orbit has an eccentricity of 0.22 and an inclination of 1° with respect to the ecliptic. The first precovery was taken at Palomar Observatory in 1954, extending the asteroid's observation arc by 36 years prior to its discovery.

== Physical characteristics ==
=== Diameter and albedo ===
According to the survey carried out by NASA's Wide-field Infrared Survey Explorer with its subsequent NEOWISE mission, Pyramus measures 9.2 kilometers in diameter and its surface has an albedo of 0.069. This is in line with a generic absolute magnitude-to-diameter conversion that gives a diameter of 4 to 9 kilometers for an albedo between 0.05 and 0.25.

=== Lightcurves ===
As of 2018, no rotational lightcurve has been obtained of Pyramus. The asteroid's rotation period, pole and shape remain unknown.

== Naming ==
This minor planet was named from Greco-Roman mythology after Pyramus, the lover of Thisbe, from which the tragedy of Romeo and Juliet ultimately originated. As narrated in Ovid's Metamorphoses, the two ill-fated lovers committed suicide as their parents were against their marriage. The asteroid's name was proposed by Austrian amateur astronomer Herbert Raab. The citation mentions that the "two lovers are now finally united forever in the asteroid belt". The approved naming citation was published by the Minor Planet Center on 6 January 2003 (M.P.C. 47301).

== See also ==
- 88 Thisbe – A large main belt asteroid named after Thisbe
