= 734 Benda =

Large background asteroid

Discovery
- Discovered by: J. Palisa
- Discovery site: Vienna Obs.
- Discovery date: 11 October 1912

Designations
- Named after: Anna Benda (discoverer's wife)
- Alternative designations: A912 TF · 1912 PH
- Minor planet category: main-belt · (outer); background

Orbital characteristics
- Epoch 31 May 2020 (JD 2459000.5)
- Uncertainty parameter 0
- Observation arc: 106.17 yr (38,778 d)
- Aphelion: 3.4628 AU
- Perihelion: 2.8333 AU
- Semi-major axis: 3.1481 AU
- Eccentricity: 0.1000
- Orbital period (sidereal): 5.59 yr (2,040 d)
- Mean anomaly: 51.852°
- Mean motion: 0° 10^{m} 35.4^{s} / day
- Inclination: 5.8048°
- Longitude of ascending node: 3.1349°
- Argument of perihelion: 66.244°

Physical characteristics
- Mean diameter: 65.917±0.746 km; 70.82±2.9 km; 73.28±1.57 km
- Synodic rotation period: 7.110±0.003 h (Note: Lightcurve plot of (734) Benda, by Robert Stephens at the Center for Solar System Studies (U81) (2013). Rotation period 7.110±0.003 hours with a brightness amplitude of 0.32 mag. Quality code is 3. Summary figures at the LCDB and CS3 websites.)
- Geometric albedo: 0.044±0.002; 0.0464±0.004; 0.051±0.005
- Spectral type: X (S3OS2)
- Absolute magnitude (H): 9.70; 9.9

734 Benda (prov. designation: A912 TF or 1912 PH) is a large background asteroid from the outer regions of the asteroid belt, approximately 70 kilometers (43 miles) in diameter. It was discovered by Austrian astronomer Johann Palisa at the Vienna Observatory on 11 October 1912. For its size, the dark X-type asteroid has a relatively short rotation period of 7.1 hours. It was named after the discoverer's wife, Anna Benda.

== Orbit and classification ==
Benda is a non-family asteroid of the main belt's background population when applying the hierarchical clustering method to its proper orbital elements. It orbits the Sun in the outer asteroid belt at a distance of 2.8–3.5 AU once every 5 years and 7 months (2,040 days; semi-major axis of 3.15 AU). Its orbit has an eccentricity of 0.10 and an inclination of 6° with respect to the ecliptic. The body's observation arc begins at the discovering Vienna Observatory on 23 February 1920, almost eight years after its official discovery observation.

== Naming ==
This minor planet was named by friends of the discoverer after Anna Benda, second wife of Johann Palisa, whom he married in 1902. However, the naming was erroneously attributed to the Czech composer Karel Bendl (1838–1897) in previous editions of the Dictionary of Minor Planet Names.

== Physical characteristics ==
Benda is an X-type asteroid in both the Tholen- and SMASS-like taxonomic variants of the Small Solar System Objects Spectroscopic Survey (S3OS2). In agreement with its low albedo (see below), this object has also been classified as a C-type and P-type asteroid.

=== Rotation period ===
In October 2013, a rotational lightcurve of Benda was obtained from photometric observations over two nights by Robert Stephens at the Center for Solar System Studies (U81) in California. Lightcurve analysis gave a well-defined rotation period of 7.110±0.003 hours with a brightness variation of 0.32±0.02 magnitude (U=3).

In August 1995, a first period of 7.114 hours was determined by Stefano Mottola (U=n/a). In March 2004, French amateur astronomer René Roy obtained a period of 7.11±0.01 hours with an amplitude of 0.28±0.01 magnitude from three nights of observations (U=3), while Robert K. Buchheim determined a period of 7.106±0.005 hours and an amplitude of 0.28±0.02 magnitude observing Benda over 10 nights at the Altimira Observatory (G76) in November 2007 (U=3). In September 2018, a collaboration of the Italian Amateur Astronomers Union reported a period of 7.105±0.001 hours with a brightness variation of 0.25±0.03 magnitude (U=3–).

=== Diameter and albedo ===
According to the surveys carried out by the NEOWISE mission of NASA's Wide-field Infrared Survey Explorer (WISE), the Infrared Astronomical Satellite IRAS, and the Japanese Akari satellite, Benda measures (65.917±0.746), (70.82±2.9) and (73.28±1.57) kilometers in diameter and its surface has an albedo of (0.054±0.010), (0.0464±0.004) and (0.044±0.002), respectively. The Collaborative Asteroid Lightcurve Link derives a low albedo of 0.0387 and a diameter of 70.71 kilometers based on an absolute magnitude of 9.9.

Alternative mean-diameters published by the WISE team include (64.45±17.46 km), (67.318±0.267 km), (70.085±0.269 km), (70.65±16.79 km) and (71.722±22.052 km) with a corresponding albedo of (0.05±0.04), (0.051±0.005), (0.0474±0.0092), (0.04±0.02) and (0.037±0.020). Two asteroid occultations on 4 April 2009 and on 3 September 2013, gave a best-fit ellipse dimension of (70.0 km × 70.0 km) and (73.0 km × 73.0 km), respectively, each with a low quality rating of 1. These timed observations are taken when the asteroid passes in front of a distant star.
