= 11887 Echemmon =

Trojan asteroid

Discovery
- Discovered by: F. Börngen; L. D. Schmadel
- Discovery site: Karl Schwarzschild Obs.
- Discovery date: 14 October 1990

Designations
- Pronunciation: /ɪˈkɛmɒn/
- Named after: Ἐχέμμων Echemmōn (Greek mythology)
- Alternative designations: 1990 TV_{12} · 1989 SX_{13}
- Minor planet category: Jupiter trojan Trojan · background

Orbital characteristics
- Epoch 23 March 2018 (JD 2458200.5)
- Uncertainty parameter 0
- Observation arc: 63.26 yr (23,105 d)
- Aphelion: 5.6556 AU
- Perihelion: 4.7089 AU
- Semi-major axis: 5.1823 AU
- Eccentricity: 0.0913
- Orbital period (sidereal): 11.80 yr (4,309 d)
- Mean anomaly: 171.52°
- Mean motion: 0° 5^{m} 0.6^{s} / day
- Inclination: 24.044°
- Longitude of ascending node: 242.65°
- Argument of perihelion: 112.06°
- Jupiter MOID: 0.0514 AU
- T_{Jupiter}: 2.8190

Physical characteristics
- Mean diameter: 31.19±0.49 km 38.51 km (calculated)
- Synodic rotation period: 8.47±0.01 h (Note: Lightcurve plots of (11887) Echemmon from Nov 2013 by Robert Stephens at the Center for Solar System Studies (U81). Quality code is 2- (lightcurve rating at CS3). Summary figures at the LCDB and CS3.)
- Geometric albedo: 0.057 (assumed); 0.095±0.008
- Spectral type: C (assumed)
- Absolute magnitude (H): 10.70; 10.8

11887 Echemmon /ɪˈkɛmɒn/ is a Jupiter trojan from the Trojan camp, approximately 31 kilometers (19 miles) in diameter. It was discovered on 14 October 1990, by German astronomers Freimut Börngen and Lutz Schmadel at the Karl Schwarzschild Observatory in Tautenburg, Germany. The dark Jovian asteroid has a rotation period of 8.5 hours. It was named after the Trojan hero Echemmon from Greek mythology.

== Orbit and classification ==
As all Jupiter trojans, Echemmon is in a 1:1 orbital resonance with Jupiter. It is located in the trailering Trojan camp at the Gas Giant's L_{5} Lagrangian point, 60° behind its orbit. It is also a non-family asteroid of the Jovian background population.

It orbits the Sun at a distance of 4.7–5.7 AU once every 11 years and 10 months (4,309 days; semi-major axis of 5.18 AU). Its orbit has an eccentricity of 0.09 and an inclination of 24° with respect to the ecliptic.

The body's observation arc begins with a precovery taken at the Palomar Observatory in November 1954, nearly 36 years prior to its official discovery observation at Tautenburg.

== Naming ==
This minor planet was named from Greek mythology after the Trojan prince Echemmon, one of the many sons of King Priam of Troy. He was slain together with his brother Chromius by Diomedes, king of Argos, during the Trojan War. The name was suggested by the first discoverer, Freimut Börngen, and published by the Minor Planet Center on 9 March 2001 (M.P.C. 42361).

== Physical characteristics ==
Echemmon is an assumed C-type asteroid, while most larger Jupiter trojans are D-types.

=== Rotation period ===
In November 2013, a rotational lightcurve of Echemmon was obtained over three nights of photometric observations by Robert Stephens at the Center for Solar System Studies in Landers, California. Lightcurve analysis gave a rotation period of 8.47±0.01 hours with a brightness amplitude of 0.15 magnitude (U=2).

=== Diameter and albedo ===
According to the survey carried out by the NEOWISE mission of NASA's Wide-field Infrared Survey Explorer, Echemmon measures 31.19 kilometers in diameter and its surface has an albedo of 0.095, while the Collaborative Asteroid Lightcurve Link assumes a standard albedo for a carbonaceous asteroid of 0.057 and calculates a diameter of 38.51 kilometers based on an absolute magnitude of 10.8.
