= 9344 Klopstock =

Asteroid

Discovery
- Discovered by: F. Börngen; L. D. Schmadel
- Discovery site: Karl Schwarzschild Obs.
- Discovery date: 12 September 1991

Designations
- Named after: Friedrich Gottlieb Klopstock (German poet)
- Alternative designations: 1991 RB_{4} · 1995 WK_{2}
- Minor planet category: main-belt · (inner) background · Vestian

Orbital characteristics
- Epoch 23 March 2018 (JD 2458200.5)
- Uncertainty parameter 0
- Observation arc: 26.35 yr (9,626 d)
- Aphelion: 2.5711 AU
- Perihelion: 2.1575 AU
- Semi-major axis: 2.3643 AU
- Eccentricity: 0.0875
- Orbital period (sidereal): 3.64 yr (1,328 d)
- Mean anomaly: 342.64°
- Mean motion: 0° 16^{m} 15.96^{s} / day
- Inclination: 5.0293°
- Longitude of ascending node: 340.39°
- Argument of perihelion: 156.40°

Physical characteristics
- Mean diameter: 3.66 km (calculated); 17.05±1.5 km
- Synodic rotation period: 5.842±0.0031 h
- Geometric albedo: 0.0116±0.002; 0.20 (assumed)
- Spectral type: S (assumed)
- Absolute magnitude (H): 14.095±0.003 (R); 14.2; 14.55; 14.86±0.14

9344 Klopstock, provisional designation 1991 RB_{4}, is a background asteroid from the inner regions of the asteroid belt. It was discovered on 12 September 1991, by German astronomers Freimut Börngen and Lutz Schmadel at the Karl Schwarzschild Observatory in Tautenburg, Germany. Poor observational data suggests that the asteroid is one of the darkest known objects with a diameter of approximately 17 kilometers (11 miles), while it is also an assumed stony asteroid with a much smaller diameter. It has a rotation period of 5.84 hours and was named after German poet Friedrich Gottlieb Klopstock.

== Orbit and classification ==
Klopstock is a non-family asteroid of the main belt's background population when applying the hierarchical clustering method to its proper orbital elements. Based on osculating Keplerian orbital elements, the asteroid has also been classified as a member of the Vesta family (401), one of the largest asteroid families of bright asteroids in the main-belt.

It orbits the Sun in the inner main-belt at a distance of 2.2–2.6 AU once every 3 years and 8 months (1,328 days; semi-major axis of 2.36 AU). Its orbit has an eccentricity of 0.09 and an inclination of 5° with respect to the ecliptic. The body's observation arc begins with its official discovery observation at Tautenburg in September 1991.

== Physical characteristics ==
Klopstock is an assumed, stony S-type asteroid, a spectral type contrary to the outstandingly low IRAS albedo (see below).

=== Rotation period ===
In September 2013, a rotational lightcurve of Klopstock was obtained from photometric observations in the R-band by astronomers at the Palomar Transient Factory in California. Lightcurve analysis gave a rotation period of 5.842 hours with a brightness amplitude of 0.38 magnitude (U=2).

=== Diameter and albedo ===
According to the survey carried out by the Infrared Astronomical Satellite (IRAS) in the 1980s, Klopstock measures 17.05 kilometers in diameter and its surface has an exceptionally low albedo of 0.0116. This would make it one of the darkest asteroid known to exist. However, the result is derived from two IRAS-observations only. The Collaborative Asteroid Lightcurve Link disregards the IRAS-data and assumes a standard albedo for a stony asteroid of 0.20 and consequently calculates a smaller diameter of 3.66 kilometers based on an absolute magnitude of 14.55.

== Naming ==
This minor planet was named after German poet Friedrich Gottlieb Klopstock (1724–1803), an important figure in the literary style called Empfindsamkeit. The official naming citation was published by the Minor Planet Center on 2 February 1999 (M.P.C. 33795).
