= 4003 Schumann =

Main-belt asteroid

Discovery
- Discovered by: F. Börngen
- Discovery site: Karl Schwarzschild Obs.
- Discovery date: 8 March 1964

Designations
- Named after: Robert Schumann (German composer)
- Alternative designations: 1964 ED · 1933 FG_{1} 1967 RK_{1} · 1968 UL_{3} 1974 SE_{2} · 1978 GM_{4} 1980 RH_{2} · 1980 TP_{6} 1981 WV_{8}
- Minor planet category: main-belt · (outer)

Orbital characteristics
- Epoch 4 September 2017 (JD 2458000.5)
- Uncertainty parameter 0
- Observation arc: 84.20 yr (30,753 days)
- Aphelion: 3.7477 AU
- Perihelion: 3.1040 AU
- Semi-major axis: 3.4258 AU
- Eccentricity: 0.0939
- Orbital period (sidereal): 6.34 yr (2,316 days)
- Mean anomaly: 343.35°
- Mean motion: 0° 9^{m} 19.44^{s} / day
- Inclination: 5.0589°
- Longitude of ascending node: 189.31°
- Argument of perihelion: 116.48°

Physical characteristics
- Dimensions: 32.03 km (calculated); 35.00±0.89 km 36.115±0.245; 38.207±0.611 km
- Mass: (1.62±0.60)×10^{18} kg (Note: Calculated from its standard gravitational parameter GM = 0.108±0.040 km^{3}/s^{2}.)
- Mean density: 65.54 g/cm^{3} (Note: Assuming a diameter of 36.1 km.)
- Synodic rotation period: 5.5984±0.0019 h 5.601±0.001 h 5.6040±0.0019 h 5.7502±0.0007 h
- Geometric albedo: 0.0439±0.0089; 0.049±0.008; 0.057 (assumed); 0.072±0.004
- Spectral type: C
- Absolute magnitude (H): 10.80 · 11.1 · 11.154±0.003 (R) · 11.186±0.002 (R) · 11.2 · 11.40±0.20

4003 Schumann, provisional designation 1964 ED, is a carbonaceous asteroid from the outer region of the asteroid belt, approximately 35 kilometers in diameter.

The asteroid was discovered on 8 March 1964, by German astronomer Freimut Börngen at the Karl Schwarzschild Observatory in Tautenburg, Eastern Germany. It was named after German composer Robert Schumann.

== Orbit and classification ==
Schumann orbits the Sun in the outer main-belt at a distance of 3.1–3.7 AU once every 6 years and 4 months (2,316 days). Its orbit has an eccentricity of 0.09 and an inclination of 5° with respect to the ecliptic. The first precovery was obtained at Heidelberg Observatory in 1933, extending the asteroid's observation arc by 31 years prior to its discovery.

== Physical characteristics ==
Schumann has been characterized as a dark C-type asteroid.

=== Diameter and albedo ===
According to the space-based surveys carried out by the Japanese Akari satellite and NASA's Wide-field Infrared Survey Explorer with its NEOWISE mission, Schumann's surface has an albedo of 0.04 and 0.07, and an estimated diameter of 35.0 and 38.2 kilometers, respectively. The Collaborative Asteroid Lightcurve Link assumes a standard albedo for carbonaceous bodies of 0.057, and calculates a diameter of 32.0 kilometers.

=== Rotation period ===
Several photometric lightcurves of Schumann gave a rotation period between 5.60 and 5.75 hours with a brightness amplitude in the range of 0.20 to 0.23 in magnitude (U=3-/2+/2).

== Naming ==
This minor planet was named in honor of German composer of the Romantic era, Robert Schumann (1810–1856), known for his Lieder, chamber works and cello concerti. He was born in Zwickau, in proximity to the discovering observatory in Tautenburg. The official naming citation was published by the Minor Planet Center on 20 May 1989 (M.P.C. 14634).
