= 8661 Ratzinger =

Main-belt asteroid

Discovery
- Discovered by: L. D. Schmadel; F. Börngen
- Discovery site: Karl Schwarzschild Obs.
- Discovery date: 14 October 1990

Designations
- Named after: Pope Benedict XVI (Pope, chronology)
- Alternative designations: 1990 TA_{13} · 1969 US; 1974 TM_{1} · 1992 CB_{1}
- Minor planet category: main-belt · (outer); Eos

Orbital characteristics
- Epoch 31 May 2020 (JD 2459000.5)
- Uncertainty parameter 0
- Observation arc: 49.86 yr (18,213 days)
- Aphelion: 3.1158 AU
- Perihelion: 2.9001 AU
- Semi-major axis: 3.0080 AU
- Eccentricity: 0.0359
- Orbital period (sidereal): 5.22 yr (1,906 days)
- Mean anomaly: 176.919°
- Mean motion: 0° 11^{m} 20.04^{s} / day
- Inclination: 10.556°
- Longitude of ascending node: 38.061°
- Argument of perihelion: 90.968°

Physical characteristics
- Dimensions: 13.394±0.198
- Synodic rotation period: 4.301035±0.000002 h
- Geometric albedo: 0.090±0.011
- Spectral type: S
- Absolute magnitude (H): 12.3

8661 Ratzinger, provisional designation 1990 TA_{13}, is an Eoan asteroid from the outer region of the asteroid belt, approximately 13.4 kilometers in diameter. It was discovered on 14 October 1990, by German astronomers Lutz Schmadel and Freimut Börngen at the Karl Schwarzschild Observatory in Tautenburg, eastern Germany. The asteroid was named after Cardinal Joseph Ratzinger, who became Pope Benedict XVI.

== Orbit and classification ==
Ratzinger is a member of the Eos family (606), the largest asteroid family in the outer main belt consisting of nearly 10,000 asteroids. It orbits the Sun at a distance of 2.9–3.1 AU once every 5 years and 3 months (1,906 days). Its orbit has an eccentricity of 0.04 and an inclination of 11° with respect to the ecliptic.

In October 1969, it was first identified as 1969 US at Crimea–Nauchnij. The body's observation arc begins at Leoncito in 1974, when it was identified as 1974 TM_{1}, 16 years prior to its official discovery observation at Tautenburg.

== Physical characteristics ==
According to the survey carried out by NASA's Wide-field Infrared Survey Explorer with its subsequent NEOWISE mission, Ratzinger measures 13.4 kilometers in diameter and its surface has an albedo of 0.09. In 2018, Josef Ďurech et al. measured its rotation period as 4.301035±0.000002 hours and provided a partial shape model.

As of 2020, Ratzinger's composition remains unknown.

== Naming ==
This minor planet was named after German Joseph Ratzinger (born 1927), then Cardinal and professor of theology, for the role he played in supervising the opening of the Vatican Secret Archives in 1998 to researchers investigating judicial errors against Galileo, after whom the minor planet 697 Galilea is named, and other medieval scientists.

Ratzinger was considered to be one of the most authoritative voices in the Vatican and became Pope Benedict XVI in 2005. The name was proposed by the asteroid's first discoverer, Lutz Schmadel. The approved naming citation was published by the Minor Planet Center on 23 May 2000 (M.P.C. 40702).
