= 15262 Abderhalden =

Main-belt asteroid

Discovery
- Discovered by: F. Börngen; L. D. Schmadel
- Discovery site: Tautenburg Obs.
- Discovery date: 12 October 1990

Designations
- Named after: Emil Abderhalden (Swiss physiologist)
- Alternative designations: 1990 TG_{4} · 1978 PJ_{3} 1978 RM_{3} · 1999 FO_{42}
- Minor planet category: main-belt · Themis

Orbital characteristics
- Epoch 4 September 2017 (JD 2458000.5)
- Uncertainty parameter 0
- Observation arc: 38.82 yr (14,178 days)
- Aphelion: 3.6694 AU
- Perihelion: 2.7536 AU
- Semi-major axis: 3.2115 AU
- Eccentricity: 0.1426
- Orbital period (sidereal): 5.76 yr (2,102 days)
- Mean anomaly: 326.73°
- Mean motion: 0° 10^{m} 16.68^{s} / day
- Inclination: 0.6286°
- Longitude of ascending node: 5.7800°
- Argument of perihelion: 287.51°

Physical characteristics
- Dimensions: 8.43 km (calculated); 12.201±0.545 km
- Synodic rotation period: 3.5327±0.0012 h
- Geometric albedo: 0.062±0.029; 0.08 (assumed)
- Spectral type: C
- Absolute magnitude (H): 13.2 · 13.282±0.004 (R) · 13.3 · 13.43±0.23 · 13.73

15262 Abderhalden (provisional designation 1990 TG_{4}) is a carbonaceous Themistian asteroid from the outer region of the asteroid belt, approximately 12 kilometers in diameter.

It was discovered by German astronomers Freimut Börngen and Lutz Schmadel at the Karl Schwarzschild Observatory in Tautenburg, eastern Germany, on 12 October 1990. The asteroid was named after Swiss physiologist and biochemist Emil Abderhalden.

== Orbit and classification ==
Abderhalden is a member of the Themis family, a dynamical family of outer main belt asteroids with nearly coplanar ecliptical orbits. It orbits the Sun in the outer main-belt at a distance of 2.8–3.7 astronomical units (AU) once every 5 years and 9 months (2,102 days). Its orbit has an eccentricity of 0.14 and an inclination of 1° with respect to the ecliptic. The first precovery was obtained at Crimea–Nauchnij in 1978, extending the asteroid's observation arc by 12 years prior to its discovery.

== Physical characteristics ==
=== Rotation period ===
In October 2013, a rotational lightcurve of Abderhalden was obtained from photometric observation taken by astronomers at the Palomar Transient Factory in California. Lightcurve analysis gave a rotation period of 3.5327 hours with a brightness variation of 0.21 magnitude (U=2).

=== Diameter and albedo ===
The Collaborative Asteroid Lightcurve Link assumes an albedo of 0.08, a standard albedo for carbonaceous asteroids of the Themis family, and calculates a diameter of 8.4 kilometers, while the NEOWISE mission of NASA's space-based Wide-field Infrared Survey Explorer finds an albedo of 0.062 with a corresponding diameter of 12.2 kilometers and an absolute magnitude of 13.2.

== Naming ==
This minor planet was named in memory of Swiss biochemist and physiologist Emil Abderhalden (1877–1950). He was a researcher in the field of physiological chemistry, founder of modern dietetics, and promoter of public welfare. Abderhalden taught physiology at the Martin Luther University of Halle-Wittenberg from 1911 until the end of World War II. The approved naming citation was published by the Minor Planet Center on 13 October 2000 (M.P.C. 41387).
