= Emil Abderhalden =

Swiss biochemist and physiologist (1877–1950)

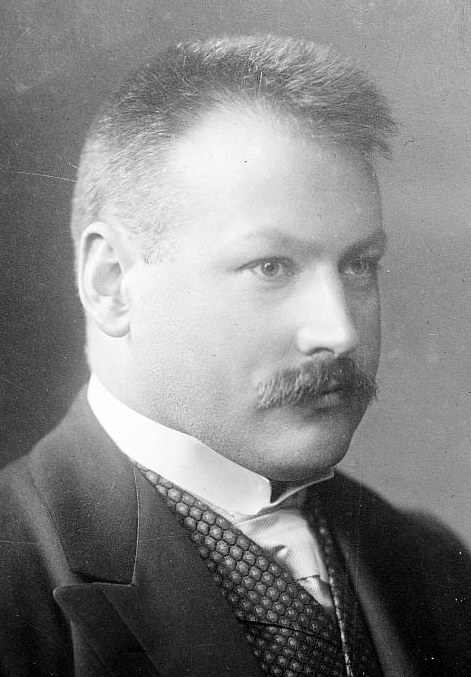
- Born: 9 March 1877; Oberuzwil in the Canton of St. Gallen, Switzerland
- Died: 5 August 1950 (aged 73); Zürich, Switzerland
- Education: University of Basel (Doctorate, 1902)
- Known for: Abderhalden reaction Abderhalden's drying pistol Abderhalden–Kaufmann–Lignac syndrome
- Awards: Cothenius Medal (1914)
- Scientific career
- Fields: Physiology; Biochemistry
- Workplaces: University of Berlin; University of Halle; University of Zurich
- Academic advisors: Hermann Emil Fischer

Emil Abderhalden (9 March 1877 – 5 August 1950) was a Swiss biochemist and physiologist. His main findings, though disputed already in the 1910s, were not finally rejected until the late 1990s. Whether his misleading findings were based on fraud or simply the result of a lack of scientific rigour remains unclear. Abderhalden's drying pistol, used in chemistry, was first described by one of his students in a textbook Abderhalden edited.

== Biography ==
Emil Abderhalden was born in Oberuzwil in the Canton of St. Gallen in Switzerland. He moved to Basel to study at the University of Basel.

During his time in Basel, he joined the rowing club and was a founding member of FC Basel. Eleven men attended the meeting of founding Fussball Club Basel on 15 November 1893. Abderhalden played his first game for the club in the home game in the Stadion Schützenmatte on 22 September 1894 as Basel won 2–0 against FC Gymnasia. Abderhalden left the club in January 1895.

Abderhalden studied medicine at the University of Basel and received his doctorate in 1902. He then studied in the laboratory of Emil Fischer and worked at the University of Berlin. In 1911 he moved to the University of Halle and taught physiology in the medical school. From 1931 to 1950, he was president of the German Academy of Natural Scientists Leopoldina. In 1936 he was appointed member of the Pontifical Academy of Sciences.

During World War I, he established a children's hospital and organized the removal of malnourished children to Switzerland. Subsequently, he resumed his research into physiological chemistry and began to study metabolism and food chemistry.

After World War II, Abderhalden returned to Switzerland in 1945 and lectured physiological chemistry at the University of Zurich as the replacement of Bonifaz Flaschenträger, who had to leave due to his membership in the NSDAP. He died there at age 73. The minor planet 15262 Abderhalden was named in his honour.

== Scientific work and controversy ==
Abderhalden is known for a blood test for pregnancy, a test for cystine in urine, and for explaining the Abderhalden–Kaufmann–Lignac syndrome, a recessive genetic condition. He did extensive work in the analysis of proteins, polypeptides, and enzymes. His Abwehrfermente ("defensive enzymes") theory stated that immunological challenge will induce the production of proteases. This was seemingly "proven" by many collaborators in Europe, although attempts to verify the theory abroad failed.

The pregnancy test was determined to be unreliable a few years after its inception. In late 1912 Abderhalden's "defensive ferments reaction test" was applied to the differential diagnosis of dementia praecox from other mental diseases and from normals by Stuttgart psychiatrist August Fauser (1856–1938), and his miraculous claims of success were soon replicated by researchers in Germany and particularly in the United States. However, despite the worldwide publicity this "blood test for madness" generated, within a few years the "Abderhalden–Fauser reaction" was discredited and only a handful of American psychiatric researchers continued to believe in it. Certainly by 1920 the test was all but forgotten in the USA. Abderhalden's reputation continued to grow in Germany, however, where collaborators managed to "replicate" his results, usually by simply repeating experiments until they succeeded and discarding the negative results. As Abderhalden was seen as the founder of scientific biochemistry in Germany, questioning his work could harm one's career, as Leonor Michaelis, who had been a collaborator with Abderhalden, discovered when he reported inability to reproduce Abderhalden's claims for his pregnancy test; by 1922, Michaelis's situation in Germany was so tarnished that he had to leave the country to embark on an outstanding career of scientific success abroad. Otto Westphal described Abderhalden's work in conversation with Ute Deichmann as follows:

I had no doubt in the beginning myself, in fact I wrote a review on the Abwehrfermente in 1939. In 1942 or 1943 I spoke to Brockmann. The whole Abwehrfermente story was a fraud from beginning to end.

Abderhalden's work was strongly ideologically slanted: his theory was put to use for human experiments by Otmar von Verschuer and Josef Mengele to develop a blood test for separating "Aryan" from "non-Aryan" individuals. While Abderhalden himself did not take part in this work, evidence suggests that he was instrumental in ideologically streamlining the German Academy of Natural Scientists Leopoldina by having the Jewish members purged and replaced by Nazi sycophants.

In another research project of the KWI-A Berlin, Mengele worked officially in his role as a camp doctor at Auschwitz. Biochemist Emil Abderhalden had turned in 1940 to Verschuer, because he needed the blood of twins to check the "Abderhalden reaction named after him" on identical twins. Abderhalden asserted here, that certain reactions of the immune system are stimulated by the production of each specific protease. Due to the detection of such enzymes in the blood - Abderhalden called it "Defensive enzymes" - the detection of diseases such as mental illness or cancer through blood tests should be possible. Abderhalden also believed that racial characteristics were included in the proteins of the tissue and blood. These suggestions were taken up by Verschuer and developed into a research project on the inheritance of "specific white type bodies", from which he obviously hoped, to be able to develop a blood test for the determination of the human race. In an interim report of the KWI-A at the German Research Foundation, which funded the project, Verschuer explained that his assistant was posted as a camp doctor in Auschwitz, Mengele, who was entered as an employee in this branch. "With the permission of the Reichsführer-SS be conducted anthropological studies of the various racial groups in this concentration camp and sent the blood samples to my laboratory for processing." Also, the biochemist Günther Hillmann was included in the project, and was established as a specialist for protein research by the Kaiser Wilhelm Institute for Biochemistry under Adolf Butenandt. Verschuer spoke in this context of 200 studied blood samples from family members of different "races" which substrates are made of.

Despite his theories being rejected as early as the mid-1910s, Abderhalden still loomed large as a kind of "father figure" in parts of the German scientific community and only by Deichmann and Müller-Hill's scathing 1998 review, the entire extent of the rejection was revealed. However, in Abderhalden's days, the science of immunology was all but non-existent. That his experiments indeed seemed to "work" on occasion was probably due to immunoprecipitation. The crucial difference between this and Abderhalden's theory is that the former is an effect of antibodies, whereas the fictitious Abwehrfermente were presumed to be proteases; a difference that has large implications for biochemistry and immunology.

The most comprehensive analysis of the issue as to whether Abderhalden was simply grossly mistaken or perpetuated deliberate fraud can be found in Kaasch.

== Personal life ==
Emil Abderhalden had a son, Rudolf Abderhalden who also was a chemist and moved to Switzerland after World War II. His son found employment under Tadeusz Reichstein at the University of Basel. From 1946, he had requested for his German degree, (he was a lecturer at the University of Halle) to be acknowledged by Switzerland. But this request was only considered in 1949 after the successor for the chair for physiological chemistry was found. As a former member of the NSDAP in Germany, he was not permitted to pursue his career at the university. Rudolf Abderhalden then transferred to industry and opened a private laboratory.

== Bibliography ==
- Bibliographie der gesamten wissenschaftlichen Literatur über den Alkohol und den Alkoholismus. Unter Mitw. von ... und mit Unterstützung der Kgl. Akademie der Wissenschaften in Berlin. Berlin and Vienna, Urban & Schwarzenberg, 1904.
- Abbau und Aufbau der Eiweisskörper im tierischen Organismus. Hoppe-Seyler's Zeitschrift für Physiologische Chemie, Strassburg, 1905, 44: 17–52.
- Lehrbuch der physiologischen Chemie in 30 Vorlesungen von Emil Abderhalden. Berlin and Vienna, Urban & Schwarzenberg, 1906. 786. pages.
- Neuere Ergebnisse auf dem Gebiete der speziellen Eiweisschemie. Jena 1909.
- Physiologisches Praktikum. Berlin 1912; 3rd edition, 1922; translated into Spanish and Russian.
- Schutzfermente des tierischen Organismus. Berlin, 1912; 5th edition, 1922 entitled: Die Abderhaldensche Reaktion. Translated into English, French, Russian, and Spanish.
- Synthese der Zemmbausteine in Pflanze und Tier. Berlin, 1912; 2nd edition, 1924.
- Die Grundlagen unserer Ernährung und unseres Stoffwechsel. Berlin, 1917; 3rd edition, 1919.
- Lehrbuch der physiologischen Chemie in Vorlesungen von Emil Abderhalden., 3rd edition, expanded and revised. Berlin and Vienna, Urban & Schwarzenberg, 1914–1915. 4th edition, revised: Berlin and Vienna, Urban & Schwarzenberg, 1920–1921.
- Lehrbuch der physiologischen Chemie mit Einschluß der physikalischen Chemie der Zellen u. Gewebe u. des Stoff-u.Kraftwechsels des tierischen Organismus in Vorlesung von Emil Abderhalden. 4th edition, revised: Berlin and Vienna, Urban & Schwarzenberg, 1923. 6th edition, 1931; translated into English and Russian. Edition 23 to 25, Basel, Schwabe, 1946. 417 pages.

== Sources ==
- Firkin, B. G. & Whitworth, J. A. (1987): Dictionary of Medical Eponyms. Parthenon Publishing. ISBN 1-85070-333-7
