= Abderhalden's drying pistol =

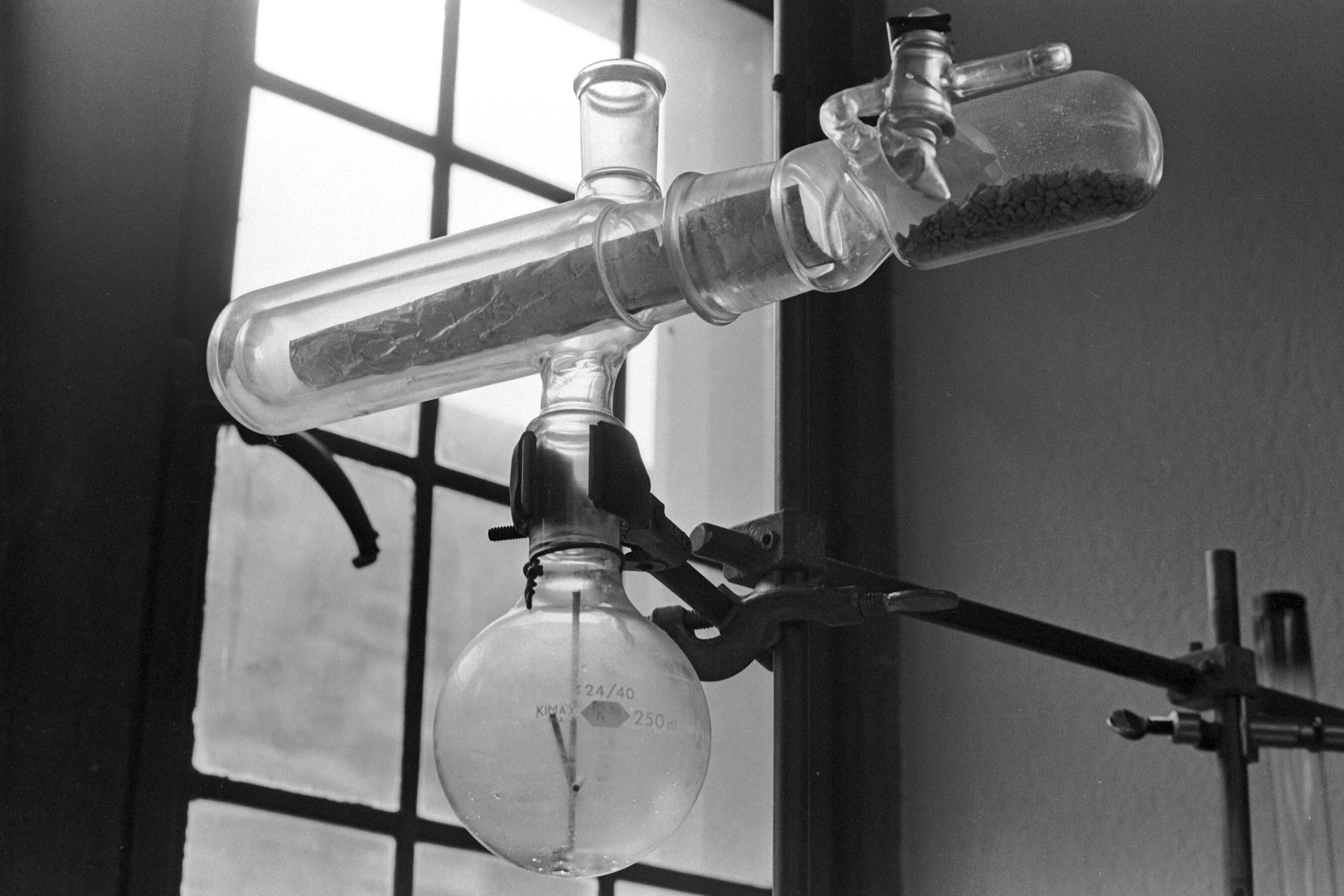
Abderhalden's drying pistol. Note the inner barrel (to be connected to the vacuum source), and the outer barrel connected to the pot. The condenser is not attached.

Abderhalden's drying pistol is a piece of laboratory glassware used to free samples from traces of water, or other impurities. It is called a "pistol" because of its resemblance to the firearm. Its use has declined due to modern hotplate technology and vacuum pumps. The apparatus was first described in a book edited by Emil Abderhalden. The drying pistol allows the sample to be dried at elevated temperature; this is especially preferred when storage in a desiccator at room temperature does not give satisfactory results.

== Operation ==
The drying pistol consists of two concentric barrels; the inner is connected to a vacuum source via a trap. The outer barrel is connected at the bottom to a round bottom flask, and a condenser. To operate the drying pistol, a sample is placed within the inner barrel, and the barrel is evacuated. The round bottom flask, filled with an appropriate solvent, is heated to a boil. Hot vapors warm the inner barrel; losses are avoided with the condenser. By choosing the appropriate solvent, the temperature at which the sample is dried can be selected.

The trap is filled with an appropriate material: water is removed with phosphorus pentoxide, acidic gases by potassium or sodium hydroxide, and organic solvents by thin pieces of paraffin. However, the use of these agents has been shown to have little efficacy. Generally, the main impurity to be removed is water.

This set-up allows the desiccation of heat-sensitive compounds under relatively mild conditions. Removing these trace impurities is especially important to give good results for elemental analysis and gravimetric analysis.
