= Adam Ries =

German mathematician (1492–1559)

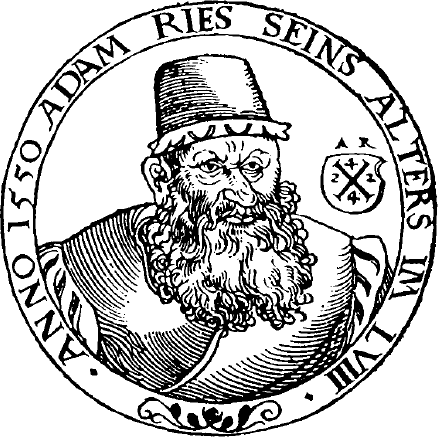
- contemporary portrait
- Born: 1492 or 1493; Bad Staffelstein
- Died: 30 March 1559; Annaberg
- Scientific career
- Fields: Mathematics

Adam Ries (1492 or 1493 – 30 March 1559) was a German mathematician. He is also known by the name Adam Riese. He is known as the "father of modern calculating" because of his decisive contribution to the recognition that Roman numerals are unpractical and to their replacement by the considerably more practical Arabic numerals.

== Life ==
Almost nothing is known about Ries' childhood, youth and education. The exact year of his birth is not known. The caption on the only known contemporary portrait of the mathematician reads: ANNO 1550 ADAM RIES SEINS ALTERS IM LVIII. So apparently he was in his 58th year of age at the time of the picture, which was made in 1550. From this it can be deduced that he was born in 1492 or 1493.

The location of his birth, Staffelstein, can be determined with certainty, since he gives information about himself in the preface to his book, Coß. His father was the owner of the mill there, Contz Ries, and his mother, Eva Kittler, was his father's second wife.

The first decades after Ries' birth are not documented, so it is not known which schools he attended. There is also no information about his studies in the matriculation registers of the universities.

The first time that Adam Ries was mentioned in a document was on 22 April 1517, when he appeared before the Council of Staffelstein because of a dispute over an inheritance. By 1509, he was already living in Zwickau with his younger brother, Conrad, who attended the Latin school there. In 1518, Ries went to Erfurt, where he ran a mathematics school, and he wrote two of his mathematics books and had them published there.

In 1522 or 1523, he moved to the newly founded mining town of Annaberg where he spent the rest of his life. There he finished work on the manuscript of his algebra textbook, Coß, in 1524, although the book was not published until 1992 by B.G. Teubner. During this time, Ries became acquainted with Anna Leuber, the daughter of Freiberg master fitter, Andreas Leuber. The wedding of the couple was mentioned in the register of the St. Anne's Church in Annaberg in 1525. In the same year, he took the oath of citizenship, purchased a house in Johannisgasse in Annaberg and settled down. He first earned his living as a Rezessschreiber (a person who checked the calculations of the mines), and later as a Gegenschreiber (a bookkeeper of the mines) and Zehntner (regional financial administrator). In 1539, he bought "Riesenburg", a small castle outside of the town, whose buildings still bear his name today. After his last work appeared in print in 1550, Ries died on 30 March 1559. Because of scanty information, it is not known where he is buried, whether in Annaberg, the Riesenburg or elsewhere.

=== Family ===
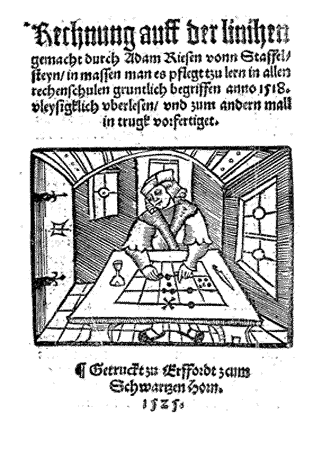
Rechnung auff der linihen

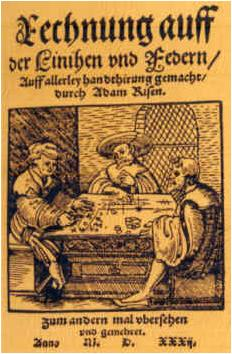
Rechnung auff der linihen und federn

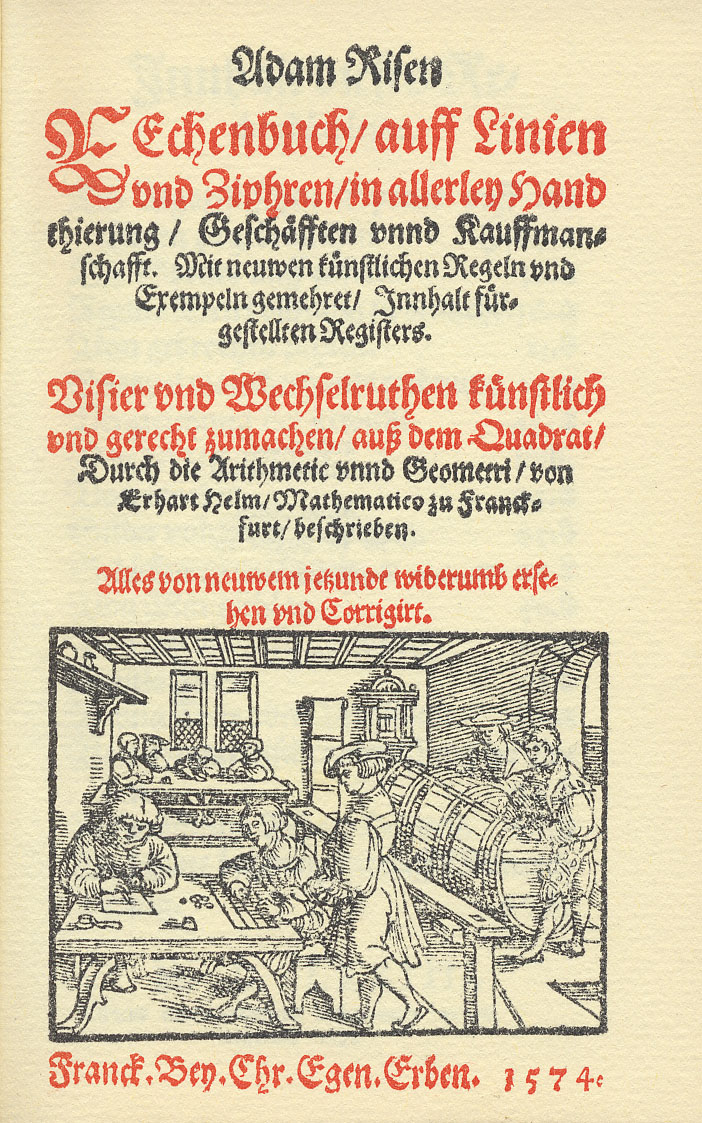
Arithmetic book, 1574

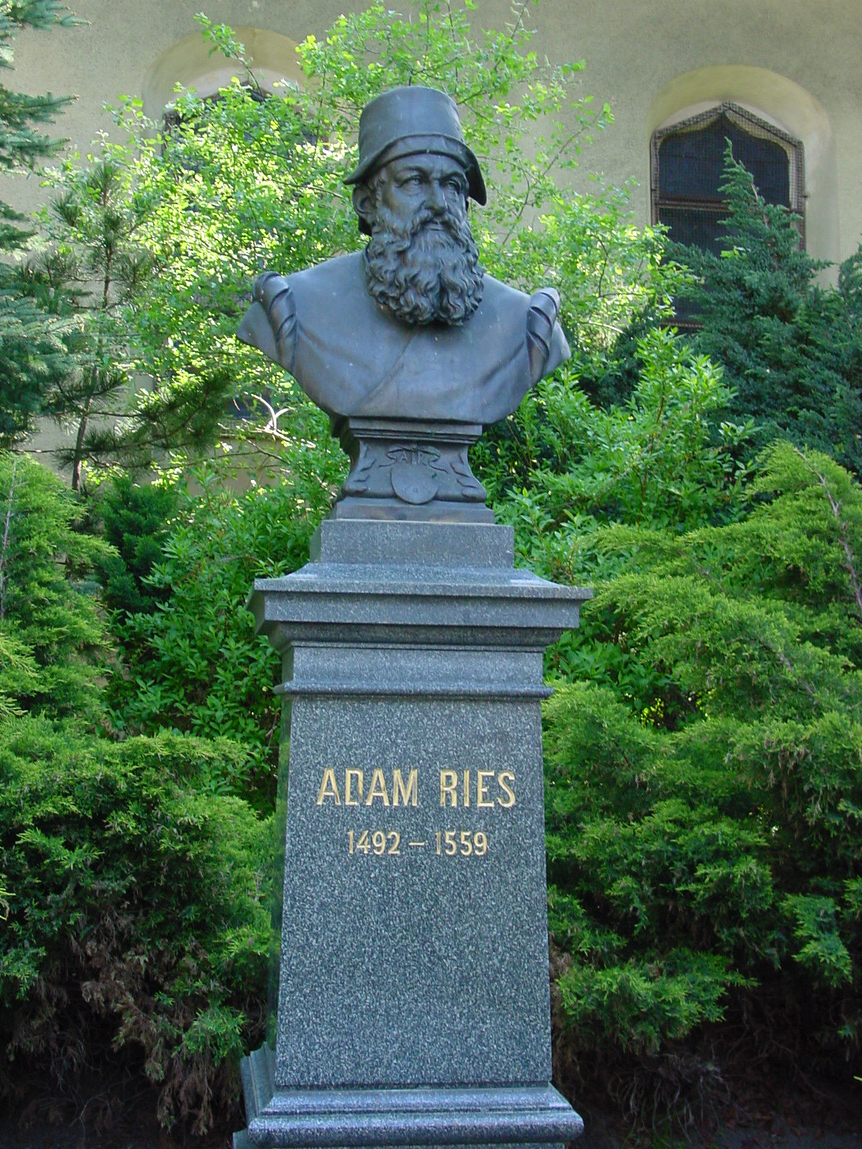
Adam Ries monument at the St. Trinitatiskirche in Annaberg-Buchholz

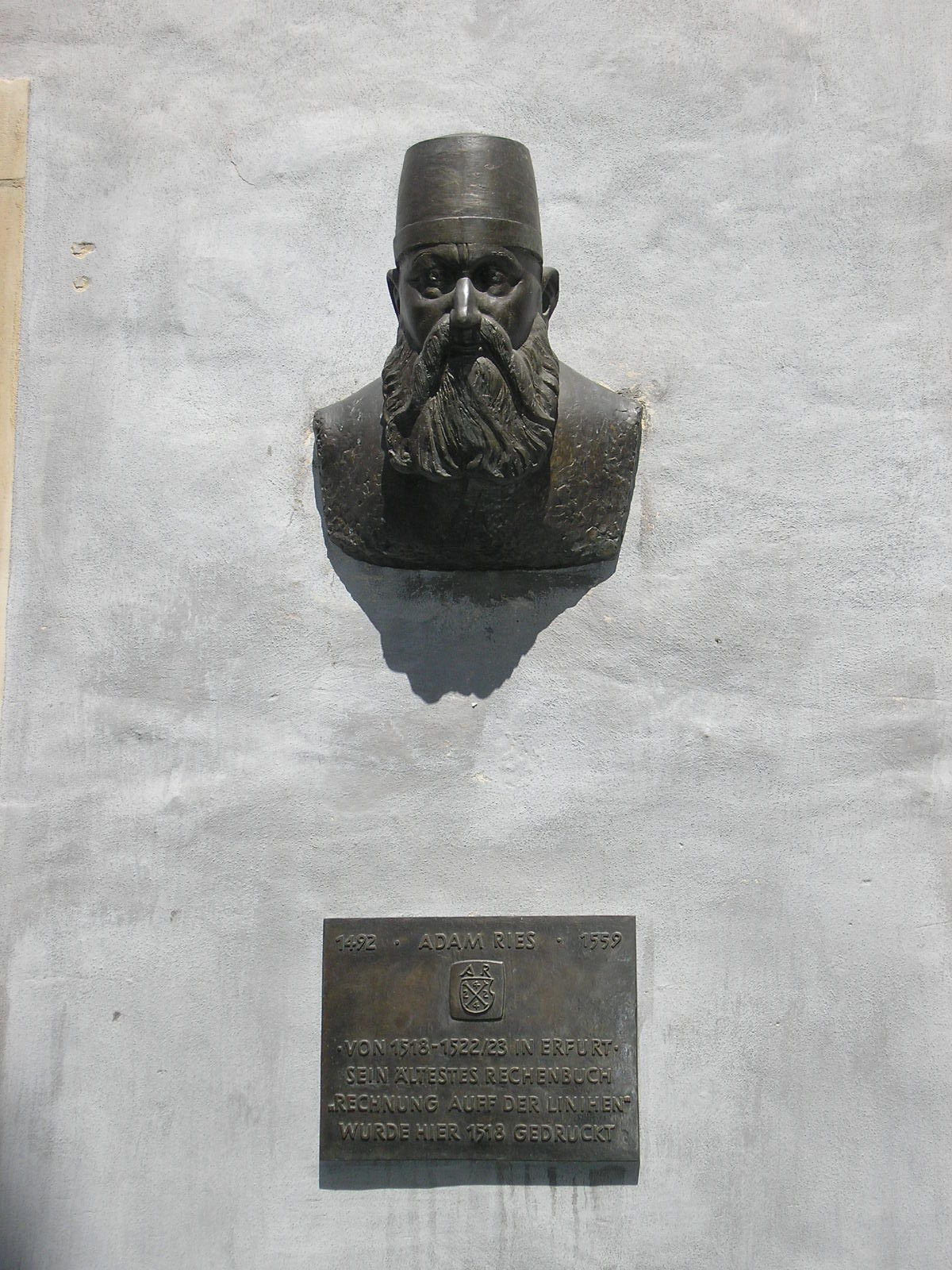
Bust in Erfurt

Ries and his wife had at least eight children. Three of the five sons, Adam, Abraham, and Jacob, were all active as mathematicians in Annaberg at times. While Abraham and Jacob died in their home town in 1604, Adam is supposed to have settled in the Harz mountains. The fourth son, Isaac, moved to Leipzig, where he was active as a Visierer (a master of weights and measures). Paul, the fifth son, was a landowner and judge in Wiesa. The three daughters, Eva, Anna and Sybilla, all married in Annaberg.

Adam Ries' descendants are the subject of constant, detailed genealogical research. Great numbers of his descendants still live in the upper Ore Mountains today. The Adam-Ries-Bund (Adam Ries Association, see external links) has taken on the task of researching all of the descendants of Adam Ries and, to date, has more than 20,000 direct descendants in its continually updated database.

=== Works ===
- Rechnung auff der linihen (1518): In it, Ries describes calculating on the lines of a calculating board, a kind of abacus. According to the foreword of the second edition, it was expressly intended for children.
- Rechnung auff der linihen und federn... (1522): Besides calculating on the calculating board, he describes numerical calculations with Indian/Arabic digits. The intended readers were the apprentices of businessmen and craftsmen. Until now, it has been published 114 times.
- Coß (manuscript 1524, printed in 1992): The algebra textbook is named after the common name for the unknown variable in the German Middle Ages, and it establishes the connection between medieval and modern algebra.
- Ein Gerechent Büchlein/ auff den Schöffel/ Eimer/ vnd Pfundtgewicht... (manuscript 1533, printed in 1536): A book with tables for calculating everyday prices; a kind of guide which, according to Ries' foreword, helps "that the poor common man not be cheated when buying bread." Also known by the name of "Annaberger Brotordnung".
- Rechenung nach der lenge/ auff den Linihen vnd Feder. (1550): Often cited under the shortened title, "Practica". The book also shows a portrait of the author for the first time, which is the only contemporary picture of Ries at all, and also gives an indication of the year of his birth.

Ries did not write his works in Latin, as was usual at that time, but in German.

== Name ==
Since the spelling of names was not as fixed at that time as it is today, the contemporary spellings "Ris, "Rise", "Ryse" and even "Reyeß" are also sometimes found.

In today's usage, both variants of his name, "Ries" and "Riese", can be found. The latter is usual in the German expression "nach Adam Riese" which means "according to Adam Ries" and it is used when speaking about simple arithmetic, e.g. zwei und zwei macht, nach Adam Riese, vier (two plus two is, according to Adam Ries, four). Furthermore, the German word "Riese" can be translated as "giant" in English, thus inspiring a common tongue-in-cheek adaptation of the beforementioned saying, "nach Adam Riese und Eva Zwerg" ("according to Adam Giant and Eve Dwarf).

== Honours & Monuments ==
The main-belt asteroid 7655 Adamries was named after him in 1997.

=== Annaberg ===
- 1893: Bust by Robert Henze

On the occasion of the 400th birthday of Adam Ries, the Annaberg Historical Society decided in 1891 to put up a monument to the mathematician. The sculpture by the Dresden sculptor, Henze, was not dedicated until 5 November 1893 because of financial difficulties. In 1943, the bronze bust was melted to make armaments and it was replaced ten years later by a sandstone copy. At the end of the 1970s, this was completely removed from the town because of fears that its condition would continue to deteriorate due to the material. In 1991, a new sandstone bust was exhibited in its current position. After severe damage by vandalism in 1992, it was once again reconstructed through the initiative of the Adam Ries Association, and it was once again placed before the church on the 100th anniversary of the first dedication.

=== Staffelstein ===
- 1874: Plaque in the Town Hall
- 1959: Sandstone relief by Karl Potzler at the Town Hall
- 1980: Bronze relief by Hubert Weber at the savings bank branch on Bamberger Straße
- 1990: Bronze relief by Huber Weber in front of the savings bank branch on Bahnhofstraße
- 1992: Bronze plaque at the entrance to the Raiffeisen bank, the location of the house where Adam Ries is presumed to have been born

=== Erfurt ===
- 1992: Three-part ensemble, with bronze bust, text plaque and calculating table set into the surface of the road on Michaelisstraße 48

== Postage Stamps ==
- The German Post Office issued two postage stamps in honor of Adam Ries in 1959 and 1992 (Michel catalog no. 308 and 1612).
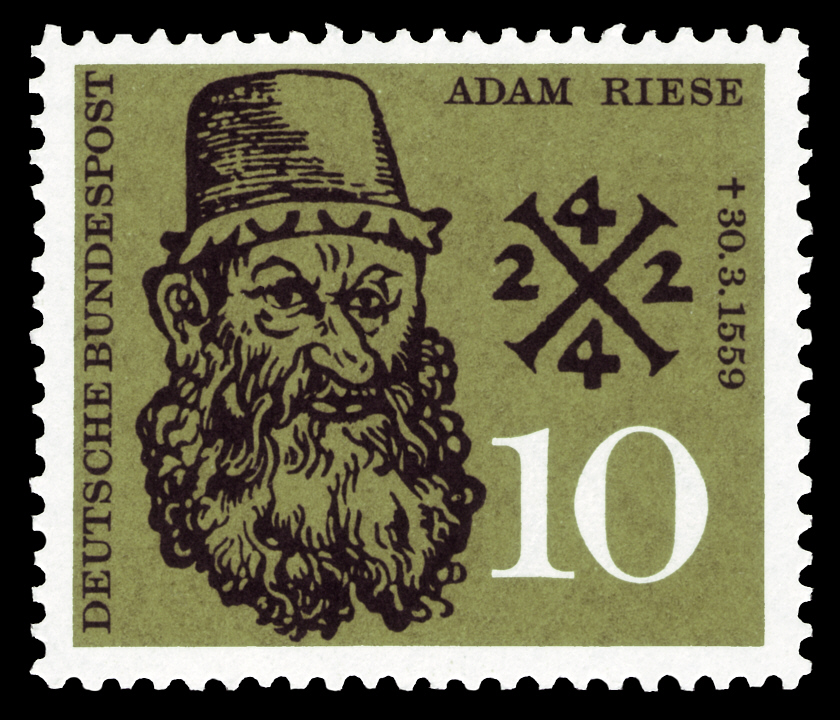
Stamp issued on the 400th anniversary of his death.
