= Lutz D. Schmadel =

German astronomer (1942-2016)

Lutz Schmadel
- Born: 2 July 1942; Berlin, Germany
- Died: 21 October 2016 (aged 74)
- Spouse: Anna Theresia Schmadel
- Parent: Walther Schmadel

Minor planets discovered: 245
see § List of discovered minor planets

Lutz Dieter Schmadel (2 July 1942 – 21 October 2016) was a German astronomer and a prolific discoverer of asteroids, who worked at the Astronomisches Rechen-Institut (ARI) of the University of Heidelberg.

His special interest was the astrometry of minor planets. Among his numerous discoveries were the three main-belt asteroids 8661 Ratzinger, 10114 Greifswald, and 11508 Stolte.

He was the author of the Dictionary of Minor Planet Names, a reference book containing information about the discovery and naming of 12,804 asteroids (March 2006). One asteroid 2234 Schmadel, discovered in 1977, was named in his honor. The asteroid 8811 Waltherschmadel was named for his father, Walther Schmadel (1902–1944), who died at the Eastern Front near Stalingrad during World War 2.

== Discoveries ==
Lutz Schmadel is credited by the Minor Planet Center with the discovery of 245 minor planets made between 1960 and 1993.

=== List of discovered minor planets ===
5628 Preussen	13 September 1991	list^{[A]}
5689 Rhön	9 September 1991	list^{[A]}
6044 Hammer-Purgstall	13 September 1991	list^{[A]}
6068 Brandenburg	10 October 1990	list^{[A]}
6157 Prey	9 September 1991	list^{[A]}
6209 Schwaben	12 October 1990	list^{[A]}
6457 Kremsmünster	2 September 1992	list^{[A]}
6717 Antal	10 October 1990	list^{[A]}
6718 Beiglböck	14 October 1990	list^{[A]}
6864 Starkenburg	12 September 1991	list^{[A]}
6966 Vietoris	13 September 1991	list^{[A]}
7127 Stifter	9 September 1991	list^{[A]}
7414 Bosch	13 October 1990	list^{[A]}
7580 Schwabhausen	13 October 1990	list^{[A]}
7586 Bismarck	13 September 1991	list^{[A]}
7700 Rote Kapelle	13 October 1990	list^{[A]}
7767 Tomatic	13 September 1991	list^{[A]}
7945 Kreisau	13 September 1991	list^{[A]}
8019 Karachkina	14 October 1990	list^{[A]}
8020 Erzgebirge	14 October 1990	list^{[A]}
8089 Yukar	13 October 1990	list^{[A]}
8171 Stauffenberg	5 September 1991	list^{[A]}
8501 Wachholz	13 October 1990	list^{[A]}
8502 Bauhaus	14 October 1990	list^{[A]}
8661 Ratzinger	14 October 1990	list^{[A]}

8847 Huch	12 October 1990	list^{[A]}
8860 Rohloff	5 October 1991	list^{[A]}
8861 Jenskandler	3 October 1991	list^{[A]}
9187 Walterkröll	12 September 1991	list^{[A]}
9344 Klopstock	12 September 1991	list^{[A]}
9351 Neumayer	2 October 1991	list^{[A]}
9610 Vischer	2 September 1992	list^{[A]}
9761 Krautter	13 September 1991	list^{[A]}
9762 Hermannhesse	13 September 1991	list^{[A]}
9861 Jahreiss	9 September 1991	list^{[A]}
9863 Reichardt	13 September 1991	list^{[A]}
9956 Castellaz	5 October 1991	list^{[A]}
10095 Carlloewe	9 September 1991	list^{[A]}
10114 Greifswald	4 September 1992	list^{[A]}
10116 Robertfranz	21 September 1992	list^{[A]}
10761 Lyubimets	12 October 1990	list^{[A]}
10762 von Laue	12 October 1990	list^{[A]}
10763 Hlawka	12 October 1990	list^{[A]}
10764 Rübezahl	12 October 1990	list^{[A]}
10782 Hittmair	12 September 1991	list^{[A]}
10786 Robertmayer	7 October 1991	list^{[A]}
10787 Ottoburkard	4 October 1991	list^{[A]}
11050 Messiaën	13 October 1990	list^{[A]}
11508 Stolte	12 October 1990	list^{[A]}
11573 Helmholtz	20 September 1993	list^{[A]}

11886 Kraske	10 October 1990	list^{[A]}
11887 Echemmon	14 October 1990	list^{[A]}
11916 Wiesloch	24 September 1992	list^{[A]}
12323 Haeckel	4 September 1992	list^{[A]}
12327 Terbrüggen	21 September 1992	list^{[A]}
12729 Berger	13 September 1991	list^{[A]}
13055 Kreppein	14 October 1990	list^{[A]}
13092 Schrödinger	24 September 1992	list^{[A]}
13530 Ninnemann	9 September 1991	list^{[A]}
13531 Weizsäcker	13 September 1991	list^{[A]}
13559 Werth	4 September 1992	list^{[A]}
13954 Born	13 October 1990	list^{[A]}
14412 Wolflojewski	9 September 1991	list^{[A]}
14413 Geiger	5 September 1991	list^{[A]}
14871 Pyramus	13 October 1990	list^{[A]}
15262 Abderhalden	12 October 1990	list^{[A]}
15263 Erwingroten	13 October 1990	list^{[A]}
15264 Delbrück	11 October 1990	list^{[A]}
15265 Ernsting	12 October 1990	list^{[A]}
15282 Franzmarc	13 September 1991	list^{[A]}
15301 Marutesser	21 September 1992	list^{[A]}
15724 Zille	12 October 1990	list^{[A]}
15727 Ianmorison	10 October 1990	list^{[A]}
15728 Karlmay	11 October 1990	list^{[A]}
15761 Schumi	24 September 1992	list^{[A]}

16505 Sulzer	12 October 1990	list^{[A]}
16544 Hochlehnert	9 September 1991	list^{[A]}
16590 Brunowalter	21 September 1992	list^{[A]}
17458 Dick	13 October 1990	list^{[A]}
17459 Andreashofer	13 October 1990	list^{[A]}
17460 Mang	10 October 1990	list^{[A]}
17484 Ganghofer	13 September 1991	list^{[A]}
17488 Mantl	2 October 1991	list^{[A]}
17489 Trenker	2 October 1991	list^{[A]}
18359 Jakobstaude	13 October 1990	list^{[A]}
18360 Sachs	10 October 1990	list^{[A]}
18395 Schmiedmayer	21 September 1992	list^{[A]}
18396 Nellysachs	21 September 1992	list^{[A]}
19162 Wambsganss	10 October 1990	list^{[A]}
19178 Walterbothe	9 September 1991	list^{[A]}
19182 Pitz	7 October 1991	list^{[A]}
19183 Amati	5 October 1991	list^{[A]}
19208 Starrfield	2 September 1992	list^{[A]}
19992 Schönbein	10 October 1990	list^{[A]}
19993 Günterseeber	10 October 1990	list^{[A]}
20012 Ranke	13 September 1991	list^{[A]}
21050 Beck	10 October 1990	list^{[A]}
21074 Rügen	12 September 1991	list^{[A]}
21075 Heussinger	12 September 1991	list^{[A]}
21076 Kokoschka	12 September 1991	list^{[A]}

21109 Sünkel	4 September 1992	list^{[A]}
21110 Karlvalentin	4 September 1992	list^{[A]}
21118 Hezimmermann	24 September 1992	list^{[A]}
22322 Bodensee	13 September 1991	list^{[A]}
22348 Schmeidler	24 September 1992	list^{[A]}
22369 Klinger	18 September 1993	list^{[A]}
23472 Rolfriekher	10 October 1990	list^{[A]}
23473 Voss	11 October 1990	list^{[A]}
23490 Monikohl	12 September 1991	list^{[A]}
23514 Schneider	2 September 1992	list^{[A]}
24699 Schwekendiek	13 October 1990	list^{[A]}
24712 Boltzmann	12 September 1991	list^{[A]}
24713 Ekrutt	12 September 1991	list^{[A]}
24748 Nernst	26 September 1992	list^{[A]}
24749 Grebel	24 September 1992	list^{[A]}
24750 Ohm	24 September 1992	list^{[A]}
26842 Hefele	2 October 1991	list^{[A]}
27758 Michelson	12 September 1991	list^{[A]}
29185 Reich	13 October 1990	list^{[A]}
29208 Halorentz	9 September 1991	list^{[A]}
29214 Apitzsch	2 October 1991	list^{[A]}
29246 Clausius	2 September 1992	list^{[A]}
29250 Helmutmoritz	24 September 1992	list^{[A]}
30826 Coulomb	10 October 1990	list^{[A]}
30827 Lautenschläger	10 October 1990	list^{[A]}

30828 Bethe	12 October 1990	list^{[A]}
30829 Wolfwacker	10 October 1990	list^{[A]}
30830 Jahn	14 October 1990	list^{[A]}
30847 Lampert	13 September 1991	list^{[A]}
30850 Vonsiemens	7 October 1991	list^{[A]}
30851 Reißfelder	2 October 1991	list^{[A]}
30852 Debye	2 October 1991	list^{[A]}
30882 Tomhenning	21 September 1992	list^{[A]}
30883 de Broglie	24 September 1992	list^{[A]}
32808 Bischoff	10 October 1990	list^{[A]}
32809 Sommerfeld	10 October 1990	list^{[A]}
32810 Steinbach	10 October 1990	list^{[A]}
32811 Apisaon	14 October 1990	list^{[A]}
32821 Posch	9 September 1991	list^{[A]}
32853 Döbereiner	21 September 1992	list^{[A]}
32855 Zollitsch	24 September 1992	list^{[A]}
37582 Faraday	12 October 1990	list^{[A]}
37583 Ramonkhanna	13 October 1990	list^{[A]}
37584 Schleiden	10 October 1990	list^{[A]}
37592 Pauljackson	3 October 1991	list^{[A]}
37608 Löns	24 September 1992	list^{[A]}
39536 Lenhof	10 October 1990	list^{[A]}
42487 Ångström	9 September 1991	list^{[A]}
42492 Brüggenthies	3 October 1991	list^{[A]}
43790 Ferdinandbraun	12 October 1990	list^{[A]}

43804 Peterting	10 September 1991	list^{[A]}
43806 Augustepiccard	13 September 1991	list^{[A]}
43813 Kühner	7 October 1991	list^{[A]}
46563 Oken	12 September 1991	list^{[A]}
48447 Hingley	10 October 1990	list^{[A]}
48456 Wilhelmwien	12 September 1991	list^{[A]}
48457 Joseffried	12 September 1991	list^{[A]}
48458 Merian	13 September 1991	list^{[A]}
48471 Orchiston	7 October 1991	list^{[A]}
48472 Mössbauer	2 October 1991	list^{[A]}
48492 Utewielen	24 September 1992	list^{[A]}
52228 Protos	5 September 1977	list
52291 Mott	10 October 1990	list^{[A]}
52292 Kamdzhalov	10 October 1990	list^{[A]}
52293 Mommsen	12 October 1990	list^{[A]}
52294 Detlef	12 October 1990	list^{[A]}
52301 Qumran	9 September 1991	list^{[A]}
52308 Hanspeterröser	7 October 1991	list^{[A]}
52337 Compton	2 September 1992	list^{[A]}
52341 Ballmann	21 September 1992	list^{[A]}
55753 Raman	13 September 1991	list^{[A]}
58098 Quirrenbach	9 October 1977	list
58186 Langkavel	13 September 1991	list^{[A]}
58215 von Klitzing	21 September 1992	list^{[A]}
58217 Peterhebel	24 September 1992	list^{[A]}

65685 Behring	10 October 1990	list^{[A]}
65692 Trifu	12 September 1991	list^{[A]}
65708 Ehrlich	4 September 1992	list^{[A]}
65712 Schneidmüller	24 September 1992	list^{[A]}
69286 von Liebig	10 October 1990	list^{[A]}
69287 Günthereichhorn	10 October 1990	list^{[A]}
69288 Berlioz	11 October 1990	list^{[A]}
69295 Stecklum	2 October 1991	list^{[A]}
69312 Rogerbacon	24 September 1992	list^{[A]}
73686 Nussdorf	10 October 1990	list^{[A]}
73687 Thomas Aquinas	10 October 1990	list^{[A]}
73692 Gürtler	12 September 1991	list^{[A]}
73693 Dorschner	12 September 1991	list^{[A]}
73699 Landaupfalz	4 October 1991	list^{[A]}
73700 von Kues	5 October 1991	list^{[A]}
73701 Siegfriedbauer	3 October 1991	list^{[A]}
79129 Robkoldewey	11 October 1990	list^{[A]}
79138 Mansfeld	13 September 1991	list^{[A]}
85179 Meistereckhart	11 October 1990	list^{[A]}
85190 Birgitroth	12 September 1991	list^{[A]}
85195 von Helfta	7 October 1991	list^{[A]}
85196 Halle	4 October 1991	list^{[A]}
85197 Ginkgo	5 October 1991	list^{[A]}
85198 Weltenburg	2 October 1991	list^{[A]}
85199 Habsburg	3 October 1991	list^{[A]}

85214 Sommersdorf	21 September 1992	list^{[A]}
85215 Hohenzollern	26 September 1992	list^{[A]}
85216 Schein	24 September 1992	list^{[A]}
90672 Metrorheinneckar	6 September 1977	list
90709 Wettin	12 October 1990	list^{[A]}
90711 Stotternheim	10 October 1990	list^{[A]}
90712 Wittelsbach	12 October 1990	list^{[A]}
(90718) 1991 RW_{3}	12 September 1991	list^{[A]}
96205 Ararat	24 September 1992	list^{[A]}
96206 Eschenberg	24 September 1992	list^{[A]}
100027 Hannaharendt	12 October 1990	list^{[A]}
100028 von Canstein	10 October 1990	list^{[A]}
100029 Varnhagen	10 October 1990	list^{[A]}
100046 Worms	2 October 1991	list^{[A]}
100047 Leobaeck	2 October 1991	list^{[A]}
(100084) 1992 SY_{13}	26 September 1992	list^{[A]}
120460 Hambach	13 October 1990	list^{[A]}
120461 Gandhi	10 October 1990	list^{[A]}
120481 Johannwalter	24 September 1992	list^{[A]}
150118 Petersberg	18 September 1993	list^{[A]}
152559 Bodelschwingh	12 October 1990	list^{[A]}
(160018) 1991 TY_{2}	7 October 1991	list^{[A]}
160512 Franck-Hertz	11 October 1990	list^{[A]}
(160513) 1990 TD_{13}	12 October 1990	list^{[A]}
162001 Vulpius	10 October 1990	list^{[A]}

important;
(162002) 1990 TC_{10}	10 October 1990	list^{[A]}
168321 Josephschmidt	12 September 1991	list^{[A]}
(173120) 1990 TL_{9}	10 October 1990	list^{[A]}
178294 Wertheimer	11 October 1990	list^{[A]}
190283 Schielicke	12 September 1991	list^{[A]}
192293 Dominikbrunner	10 October 1990	list^{[A]}
(204967) 1991 TH_{7}	3 October 1991	list^{[A]}
225277 Stino	24 September 1960	list^{[B]}
231666 Aisymnos	24 September 1960	list^{[B]}
267003 Burkert	10 August 1978	list
(275491) 1960 SR	24 September 1960	list^{[B]}
279723 Wittenberg	12 September 1991	list^{[A]}
(282028) 1990 TV_{9}	10 October 1990	list^{[A]}
(297234) 1960 SP	24 September 1960	list^{[B]}
322510 Heinrichgrüber	10 October 1990	list^{[A]}
(333842) 1960 SV	24 September 1960	list^{[B]}
(359653) 2011 ST_{28}	24 September 1960	list^{[B]}
(363010) 1960 SA_{1}	24 September 1960	list^{[B]}
(373394) 1990 TQ_{9}	10 October 1990	list^{[A]}
(443796) 1960 SW	24 September 1960	list^{[B]}
Co-discovery made with:^{A} F. Börngen^{B} R. M. Stoss

== Works ==
- Dictionary of Minor Planet Names, Google books
- Dictionary of minor planet names (5th Edition). Springer Verlag, Berlin/Heidelberg 2003, ISBN 3-540-00238-3
- Dictionary of minor planet names (Addendum to the 5th Edition: 2003-2005). Springer Verlag, Berlin/Heidelberg 2006, ISBN 3-540-34360-1
- Dictionary of minor planet names (Addendum to the 5th Edition: 2006-2008). Springer Verlag, Berlin/Heidelberg 2006, ISBN 3-642-01964-1
- Dictionary of minor planet names (6th Edition). Springer Verlag, Berlin/Heidelberg 2012, ISBN 3-642-29717-X
