= Dictionary of Minor Planet Names =

- Publisher: International Astronomical Union
- Publication date: 1992

The Dictionary of Minor Planet Names is a reference book containing information about the discovery and naming of 12,804 asteroids (March 2006). It is published by the International Astronomical Union.

== Editions ==
- Lutz D. Schmadel (1992). Dictionary of Minor Planet Names (1st ed.). Berlin Heidelberg: Springer-Verlag.
- ———————— (1993). Dictionary of Minor Planet Names (2nd ed.). Berlin Heidelberg: Springer-Verlag.
- ———————— (1996). Dictionary of Minor Planet Names (3rd ed.). Berlin Heidelberg: Springer-Verlag.(5,252 names, 7,041 numbered until June 1996)
- ———————— (1999). Dictionary of Minor Planet Names (4th ed.). Berlin Heidelberg: Springer-Verlag.
- ———————— (2003). Dictionary of Minor Planet Names (5th ed.). Berlin Heidelberg: Springer-Verlag. ISBN 3-540-00238-3. (+10,000 names)
- ———————— (2005). Dictionary of Minor Planet Names Addendum to 5th edition. Berlin Heidelberg: Springer-Verlag. ISBN 3-540-34360-1.
- ———————— (2008). Dictionary of Minor Planet Names Addendum to 5th edition. Berlin Heidelberg: Springer-Verlag. ISBN 978-3-642-01964-7.
- ———————— (2012). Dictionary of Minor Planet Names (6th ed.). Berlin Heidelberg: Springer-Verlag. ISBN 978-3-642-29717-5. (+17,000 names)
- ———————— (2014). Dictionary of Minor Planet Names Addentum to 6th edition. Berlin Heidelberg: Springer-Verlag. ISBN 978-3-642-29717-5. (22,000 names)
