= Günther Hillmann =

German biochemist and chemist (1919–1975)

Günther Hillmann (15 April 1919 in Ludwigslust – 8 May 1976 in Nuremberg) was a German biochemist. During the Second World War he helped advise Otmar von Verschuer, head of the KWI on anthropology, and helped work on a research project in which the concentration camp doctor Josef Mengele delivered blood samples from Auschwitz concentration camp for him to analyze. After the war, he worked as a scientist in the Federal Republic and directed the Chemical Institute of the Nuremberg Hospitals for the rest of his life. He was also known for working of Thyronine.

== Publications ==
- Über die Spaltung racemischer Aminosäuren in die optischen Antipoden in Verbindung mit der Peptidsynthese. (1947).
- Synthese des Schilddrüsenhormons. Tübingen 1955.
- Biosynthese und Stoffwechselwirkungen der Schilddrüsenhormone. Tübingen 1961.

== Secondary literature ==
- Achim Trunk: Rassenforschung und Biochemie. Ein Projekt - und die Frage nach dem Beitrag Butenandts. In: Wolfgang Schieder u. Achim Trunk (Hrsg.): Adolf Butenandt und die Kaiser-Wilhelm-Gesellschaft. Wissenschaft, Industrie und Politik im ‚Dritten Reich‘. Göttingen 2004, S. 247-285.
- In memoriam Günther Hillmann. In: Clinical Chemistry and Laboratory Medicine. 13, Heft 7 (1975), S. 329–330, ISSN (Online) 1437-4331, ISSN (Print) 1434-6621, doi:10.1515/cclm.1975.13.7.329.
- Robert N. Proctor: Adolf Butenandt (1903–1995). Nobelpreisträger, Nationalsozialist und MPG-Präsident. Ein erster Blick in den Nachlaß. (= Ergebnisse. Vorabdrucke aus dem Forschungsprogramm „Geschichte der Kaiser-Wilhelm-Gesellschaft im Nationalsozialismus“; 2), Berlin 2000. (PDF)
