= Karl Schwarzschild Observatory =

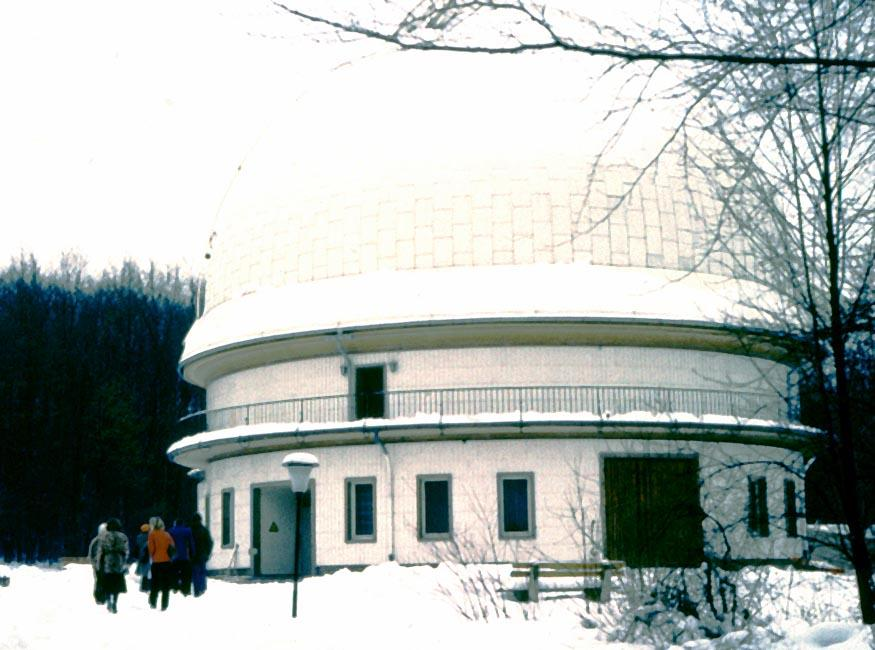
- Karl Schwarzschild Observatory in 1981
- Alternative names: Thüringer Landessternwarte Tautenburg
- Named after: Karl Schwarzschild
- Organization: Thuringian State Observatory
- Observatory code: 033
- Location: Tautenburg, Thuringia
- Coordinates: 50°58′48.4″N 11°42′40.2″E
- Altitude: 341 m (1,119 ft)
- Established: 1960
- Website: www.tls-tautenburg.de

Telescopes
- Alfred Jensch Telescope: Carl Zeiss reflector
- Related media on Commons

The Karl Schwarzschild Observatory (Officially: Thuringia State Observatory Tautenburg) is a German astronomical observatory in Tautenburg near Jena, Thuringia. It is owned and operated as under public law by the State of Thuringia.

It was founded in 1960 as an affiliated institute of the former German Academy of Sciences at Berlin in GDR and named in honour of the astronomer and physicist Karl Schwarzschild (1873–1916). In 1992, the institute was re-established as Thuringian State Observatory (Thüringer Landessternwarte, TLS).

== Observatory ==
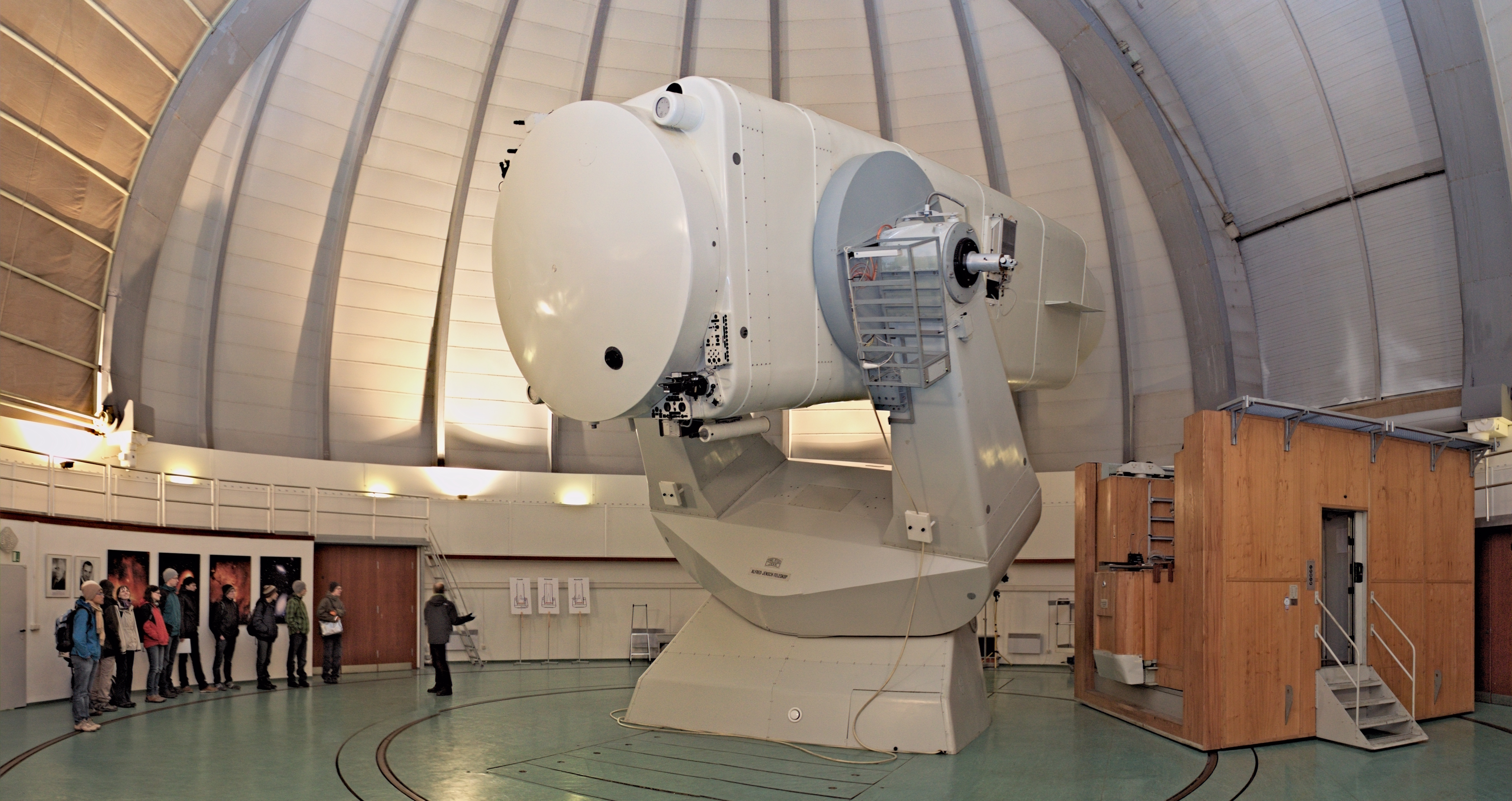
Alfred Jensch Telescope

The observatory has the largest telescope located in Germany, which is also the largest Schmidt camera in the world. Made by VEB Zeiss Jena (the branch of Carl Zeiss located in Jena in what was then East Germany), this instrument is known as Alfred Jensch Telescope: though its mirror is 2 metres in diameter, the telescope's aperture is 1.34 m.

The observatory has observed several exoplanets and brown dwarfs, as around the stars HD 8673, 30 Arietis, 4 Ursae Majoris, and around HD 13189 on 5 April 2005. The observatory also hosts an International station for the interferometric radio telescope LOFAR.

== See also ==
- Alfred Jensch
- Bernhard Schmidt
- List of astronomical observatories
