= Meanings of minor-planet names: 22001–23000 =

As minor planet discoveries are confirmed, they are given a permanent number by the IAU's Minor Planet Center (MPC), and the discoverers can then submit names for them, following the IAU's naming conventions. The list below concerns those minor planets in the specified number-range that have received names, and explains the meanings of those names.

Official naming citations of newly named small Solar System bodies are approved and published in a bulletin by IAU's Working Group for Small Bodies Nomenclature (WGSBN). Before May 2021, citations were published in MPC's Minor Planet Circulars for many decades. Recent citations can also be found on the JPL Small-Body Database (SBDB). Until his death in 2016, German astronomer Lutz D. Schmadel compiled these citations into the Dictionary of Minor Planet Names (DMP) and regularly updated the collection.

Based on Paul Herget's The Names of the Minor Planets, Schmadel also researched the unclear origin of numerous asteroids, most of which had been named prior to World War II. This article incorporates text from this source, which is in the public domain: SBDB New namings may only be added to this list below after official publication as the preannouncement of names is condemned. The WGSBN publishes a comprehensive guideline for the naming rules of non-cometary small Solar System bodies.

== 22001–22100 ==
| Named minor planet | Provisional | This minor planet was named for... | Ref; Catalog |
|---|---|---|---|
| 22001 Philharrington | 1999 XY_{41} | Philip S. Harrington, American amateur astronomer, astronomy author and educator. | IAU · 22001 |
| 22002 Richardregan | 1999 XB_{42} | Richard Regan, American mentor of a finalist in the 2005 Discovery Channel Young Scientist Challenge (DCYSC) (Src) | MPC · 22002 |
| 22003 Startek | 1999 XO_{42} | Jennifer Startek, Canadian-born mentor of a finalist in the 2005 Discovery Channel Young Scientist Challenge (DCYSC) (Src) | MPC · 22003 |
| 22005 Willnelson | 1999 XK_{47} | William Nelson, American mentor of a finalist in the 2005 Discovery Channel Young Scientist Challenge (DCYSC) (Src) | MPC · 22005 |
| 22010 Kuzmina | 1999 XM_{78} | Anastasiya Kuzmina (born 1984) is a Russian-born Slovak biathlete who has represented Slovakia since December 2008. She is the first biathlete to win gold medals in three consecutive Winter Olympics (2010 Vancouver, 2014 Sochi and 2018 Pyeongchang). | IAU · 22010 |
| 22019 Leviticusalewis | 1999 XU_{106} | Leviticus A. "L. A." Lewis (born 1956), retired US Navy Commander and worked in planetary defence. | IAU · 22019 |
| 22020 Joshuahandal | 1999 XG_{108} | Joshua Handal (born 1989), supported NASA's Planetary Defense Coordination Office (PDCO). | IAU · 22020 |
| 22021 Andreariley | 1999 XQ_{108} | Andrea Riley (born 1979), Program Executive for several NASA planetary defence missions. | IAU · 22021 |
| 22022 Gould | 1999 XR_{110} | Laurence McKinley Gould (1896–1995) was an American geologist, educator and polar explorer. Gould was chief scientist and second-in-command of the 1928-30 Byrd Antarctic Expedition. Leading a 1500-mile sledge journey to the Transantarctic Mountains, he discovered sandstone outcrops, helping to link Antarctica with Gondwana. | IAU · 22022 |
| 22025 Dorisdaou | 1999 XS_{118} | Doris Daou (born 1964), strengthened ties between NASA and the worldwide planetary defence community. | IAU · 22025 |
| 22026 Lindabillings | 1999 XS_{119} | Linda Billings (born 1951), communicated NASA's planetary defence program with the world. | IAU · 22026 |
| 22027 Romanakofler | 1999 XS_{120} | Romana Kofler (born 1973), served as a Programme Officer to the United Nations Office of Outer Space Affairs. | IAU · 22027 |
| 22028 Matthewdaniels | 1999 XP_{125} | Matthew Daniels (born 1985), served as Assistant Director for Space Security & Special Projects in the White House’s Office of Science and Technology Policy. | IAU · 22028 |
| 22029 Johnshaw | 1999 XN_{126} | Description available (see ref). Please summarize in your own words. | IAU · 22029 |
| 22032 Mikekoop | 1999 XB_{151} | Michael Walter Koop (born 1961), long-time president of the San Jose (California) Astronomical Association, is an electrical engineer by profession. His expertise in telecommunications has often been applied to meteors, observed from the ground and from aircraft | JPL · 22032 |
| 22038 Margarshain | 1999 XJ_{182} | Margaret Shain, American mentor of a finalist in the 2005 Discovery Channel Young Scientist Challenge (DCYSC) (Src) | MPC · 22038 |
| 22057 Brianking | 2000 AE_{52} | Brian King, American mentor of a finalist in the 2005 Discovery Channel Young Scientist Challenge (DCYSC) (Src) | MPC · 22057 |
| 22063 Dansealey | 2000 AO_{99} | Dan Sealey, American mentor of a finalist in the 2005 Discovery Channel Young Scientist Challenge (DCYSC) (Src) | MPC · 22063 |
| 22064 Angelalewis | 2000 AQ_{99} | Angela Lewis, American mentor of a finalist in the 2005 Discovery Channel Young Scientist Challenge (DCYSC) (Src) | MPC · 22064 |
| 22065 Colgrove | 2000 AZ_{99} | Clinton Allen Colgrove, American mentor of a finalist in the 2005 Discovery Channel Young Scientist Challenge (DCYSC) (Src) | MPC · 22065 |
| 22079 Kabinoff | 2000 AU_{151} | Richard Kabinoff, American mentor of a finalist in the 2005 Discovery Channel Young Scientist Challenge (DCYSC) (Src) | MPC · 22079 |
| 22080 Emilevasseur | 2000 AS_{161} | Emile Levasseur, American mentor of a finalist in the 2005 Discovery Channel Young Scientist Challenge (DCYSC) (Src) | MPC · 22080 |
| 22082 Rountree | 2000 AD_{165} | Robert Rountree, American mentor of a finalist in the 2005 Discovery Channel Young Scientist Challenge (DCYSC) (Src) | MPC · 22082 |

== 22101–22200 ==
back to top

| Named minor planet | Provisional | This minor planet was named for... | Ref; Catalog |
|---|---|---|---|
| 22102 Karenlamb | 2000 JR_{61} | Karen Lamb, mentor of a finalist in the 2005 Discovery Channel Young Scientist Challenge (DCYSC), a middle school science competition. † ‡ | MPC · 22102 |
| 22105 Pirko | 2000 LS_{36} | Richard G. Pirko (1952–2008) was a producer and space science educator for the Ward Beecher Planetarium at Youngstown State University. An accomplished photographer, pilot and horse trainer, his passion for astronomy exposed many college students to new educational experiences | JPL · 22105 |
| 22106 Tomokoarai | 2000 NC_{12} | Tomoko Arai (born 1971), a scientist at the Chiba Institute of Technology. | JPL · 22106 |
| 22109 Loriehutch | 2000 PJ_{22} | Lorie Hutchinson, mentor of a finalist in the 2005 Discovery Channel Young Scientist Challenge (DCYSC), a middle school science competition. † ‡ | MPC · 22109 |
| 22112 Staceyraw | 2000 QO_{181} | Stacey Raw, mentor of a finalist in the 2005 Discovery Channel Young Scientist Challenge (DCYSC), a middle school science competition. † ‡ | MPC · 22112 |
| 22120 Gaylefarrar | 2000 SO_{102} | Gayle Farrar, mentor of a finalist in the 2005 Discovery Channel Young Scientist Challenge (DCYSC), a middle school science competition. † ‡ | MPC · 22120 |
| 22132 Merkley | 2000 UD_{21} | Clark Merkley, mentor of a finalist in the 2005 Discovery Channel Young Scientist Challenge (DCYSC), a middle school science competition. † ‡ | MPC · 22132 |
| 22134 Kirian | 2000 UA_{66} | Drew Kirian, mentor of a finalist in the 2005 Discovery Channel Young Scientist Challenge (DCYSC), a middle school science competition. † ‡ | MPC · 22134 |
| 22136 Jamesharrison | 2000 VJ_{3} | James Christopher Harrison (born 1936) is an Australian blood plasma donor whose unusual plasma composition has been used to make a treatment for Rhesus disease. His 1000 donations throughout his lifetime are estimated to have saved over two million unborn babies from the condition. | JPL · 22136 |
| 22137 Annettelee | 2000 VM_{15} | Annette Lee, mentor of a finalist in the 2005 Discovery Channel Young Scientist Challenge (DCYSC), a middle school science competition. † ‡ | MPC · 22137 |
| 22138 Laynrichards | 2000 VD_{25} | Layne Richards, mentor of a finalist in the 2005 Discovery Channel Young Scientist Challenge (DCYSC), a middle school science competition. † ‡ | MPC · 22138 |
| 22139 Jamescox | 2000 VU_{28} | James Cox, mentor of a finalist in the 2005 Discovery Channel Young Scientist Challenge (DCYSC), a middle school science competition. † ‡ | MPC · 22139 |
| 22140 Suzyamamoto | 2000 VW_{32} | Suzanne Yamamoto, mentor of a finalist in the 2005 Discovery Channel Young Scientist Challenge (DCYSC), a middle school science competition. † ‡ | MPC · 22140 |
| 22142 Loripryor | 2000 VC_{37} | Lori Pryor, mentor of a finalist in the 2005 Discovery Channel Young Scientist Challenge (DCYSC), a middle school science competition. † ‡ | MPC · 22142 |
| 22143 Cathyfowler | 2000 VL_{37} | Cathy Fowler, mentor of a finalist in the 2005 Discovery Channel Young Scientist Challenge (DCYSC), a middle school science competition. † ‡ | MPC · 22143 |
| 22144 Linmichaels | 2000 VM_{37} | Linda Michaels, mentor of a finalist in the 2005 Discovery Channel Young Scientist Challenge (DCYSC), a middle school science competition. † ‡ | MPC · 22144 |
| 22146 Samaan | 2000 WM_{23} | Fida Samaan, mentor of a finalist in the 2005 Discovery Channel Young Scientist Challenge (DCYSC), a middle school science competition. † ‡ | MPC · 22146 |
| 22148 Francislee | 2000 WH_{46} | Francis Lee, mentor of a finalist in the 2005 Discovery Channel Young Scientist Challenge (DCYSC), a middle school science competition. † ‡ | MPC · 22148 |
| 22149 Cinyras | 2000 WD_{49} | Cinyras, ruler of Cyprus who gifted breast plate armour to Agamemnon. | MPC · 22149 |
| 22151 Davebracy | 2000 WM_{56} | Dave Bracy, mentor of a finalist in the 2005 Discovery Channel Young Scientist Challenge (DCYSC), a middle school science competition. † ‡ | MPC · 22151 |
| 22152 Robbennett | 2000 WG_{57} | Robbie Bennett, mentor of a finalist in the 2005 Discovery Channel Young Scientist Challenge (DCYSC), a middle school science competition. † ‡ | MPC · 22152 |
| 22153 Kathbarnhart | 2000 WT_{58} | Kathy Barnhart, mentor of a finalist in the 2005 Discovery Channel Young Scientist Challenge (DCYSC), a middle school science competition. † ‡ | MPC · 22153 |
| 22155 Marchetti | 2000 WQ_{88} | David Marchetti, mentor of a finalist in the 2005 Discovery Channel Young Scientist Challenge (DCYSC), a middle school science competition. † ‡ | MPC · 22155 |
| 22156 Richoffman | 2000 WQ_{94} | Richard Hoffman, mentor of a finalist in the 2005 Discovery Channel Young Scientist Challenge (DCYSC), a middle school science competition. † ‡ | MPC · 22156 |
| 22157 Bryanhoran | 2000 WQ_{99} | Bryan Horan, mentor of a finalist in the 2005 Discovery Channel Young Scientist Challenge (DCYSC), a middle school science competition. † ‡ | MPC · 22157 |
| 22158 Chee | 2000 WG_{101} | Carmelita Chee, mentor of a finalist in the 2005 Discovery Channel Young Scientist Challenge (DCYSC), a middle school science competition. † ‡ | MPC · 22158 |
| 22161 Santagata | 2000 WR_{123} | William Santagata, mentor of a finalist in the 2005 Discovery Channel Young Scientist Challenge (DCYSC), a middle school science competition. † ‡ | MPC · 22161 |
| 22162 Leslijohnson | 2000 WS_{123} | Leslie Johnson, mentor of a finalist in the 2005 Discovery Channel Young Scientist Challenge (DCYSC), a middle school science competition. † ‡ | MPC · 22162 |
| 22165 Kathydouglas | 2000 WX_{137} | Kathy Douglas, mentor of a finalist in the 2005 Discovery Channel Young Scientist Challenge (DCYSC), a middle school science competition. † ‡ | MPC · 22165 |
| 22167 Lane-Cline | 2000 WP_{157} | Amanda Lane-Cline, mentor of a finalist in the 2005 Discovery Channel Young Scientist Challenge (DCYSC), a middle school science competition. † ‡ | MPC · 22167 |
| 22168 Weissflog | 2000 WX_{158} | Jens Weißflog, the "Fichtelberg flea", German ski jumper | JPL · 22168 |
| 22171 Choi | 2000 WK_{179} | Diane Jeehea Choi, American finalist in the 2006 Intel Science Talent Search (ISTS), for her behavioral and social sciences project. | JPL · 22171 |
| 22173 Myersdavis | 2000 XE_{25} | Myers Abraham Davis, American finalist in the 2006 Intel Science Talent Search (ISTS), for his computer science project. | JPL · 22173 |
| 22174 Allisonmae | 2000 XG_{28} | Allison Mae Gardner, American finalist in the 2006 Intel Science Talent Search (ISTS), for her zoology project. | JPL · 22174 |
| 22177 Saotome | 2000 XS_{38} | Masatoshi Saotome, Japanese director of the Japan Space Forum and contributor to the construction of the Bisei Spaceguard Center | JPL · 22177 |
| 22180 Paeon | 2000 YZ | Paeon, the father of Agastrophus. | MPC · 22180 |
| 22183 Canonlau | 2000 YE_{12} | Canon Lau (born 1965), a veteran amateur astronomer in Hong Kong since the 1980s, has put tremendous efforts into planetary observations and imaging. | JPL · 22183 |
| 22184 Rudolfveltman | 2000 YT_{15} | Rudolf Veltman (1951–2009) was a founding member of the Dutch Meteor Society. Because of a diving accident, he was paralyzed and used a wheelchair. Undeterred, he became leader of the DMS's visual meteor section and wrote articles about meteor showers and visual meteor observations for the society's journal Radiant | JPL · 22184 |
| 22185 Štiavnica | 2000 YV_{28} | Banská Štiavnica, Slovakia, UNESCO World Heritage List site and birthplace of the second discoverer | JPL · 22185 |
| 22189 Gijskatgert | 2049 P-L | Gijs Katgert (1981–2011), Dutch physicist and son of Leiden astronomers Peter and Jet Katgert, was one of the pioneers of the research on the flow properties of foams. | JPL · 22189 |
| 22190 Stellakwee | 2100 P-L | Stella Vooren Kwee (1964–2005) was the daughter of Leiden astronomer K. K. Kwee and his wife, Sunny Kwee. | JPL · 22190 |
| 22191 Achúcarro | 2113 P-L | Joaquí Achúcarro, distinguished concert pianist, admired teacher and mentor, with a performance career spanning over 50 years in more than 50 countries. | JPL · 22191 |
| 22192 Vivienreuter | 2571 P-L | Vivien Reuter, IAU Executive Assistant from 2008 March until 2012 October, heading the IAU Secretariat in Paris. | JPL · 22192 |
| 22195 Nevadodelruiz | 3509 P-L | Nevado del Ruiz, 5389-m active volcano in Colombia, situated in Colombias Cordillera Central, a part of the Andes. | JPL · 22195 |
| 22199 Klonios | 4572 P-L | Klonios, one of the four Pelasgian Epeioi kings during the Trojan war | JPL · 22199 |

== 22201–22300 ==
back to top

| Named minor planet | Provisional | This minor planet was named for... | Ref; Catalog |
|---|---|---|---|
| 22203 Prothoenor | 6020 P-L | Prothoenor, a hero from Boeotia in the fight against Troy, as were Klonios and Arkesilaos. | JPL · 22203 |
| 22222 Hodios | 3156 T-2 | The Greek herald Hodios went together with the other Greek herald Eurybates, Odysseus and Phoenix to persuade Achilles to stop his quarrel with Agamemnon and fight the Trojans again. | JPL · 22222 |
| 22227 Polyxenos | 5030 T-2 | Polyxenos came from Elis and fought against the Trojans. | JPL · 22227 |
| 22249 Dvorets Pionerov | 1972 RF_{2} | Dvorets pionerov (Дворец пионеров, "Palace of Pioneers"), the Moscow City Palace of Youth Creativity, founded in 1936 | JPL · 22249 |
| 22250 Konstfrolov | 1978 RD_{2} | Konstantin Vasil'evich Frolov, Russian engineer, Academician of the Russian Academy of Sciences | JPL · 22250 |
| 22251 Eden | 1978 RT_{6} | Eden Lagerkvist (b. 2017), the granddaughter of the discoverer. | IAU · 22251 |
| 22253 Sivers | 1978 SU_{7} | Yakov Efimovich Sivers (1731–1808) was an outstanding Russian statesman, governor of Novgorod province. As the founder and director of the Waterways Communications Department he made an invaluable contribution to navigation in Russia. In particular, he reconstructed the old canals between the Volga and Neva rivers | JPL · 22253 |
| 22254 Vladbarmin | 1978 TV_{2} | Vladimir Pavlovich Barmin, 20th-century Russian space engineer | JPL · 22254 |
| 22260 Ur | 1979 UR | Ur, Sumer † | MPC · 22260 |
| 22263 Pignedoli | 1980 RC | Antonio Pignedoli, a mathematics professor at the Military Academy of Modena | JPL · 22263 |
| 22275 Barentsen | 1982 BU | Geert Barentsen, Belgian astronomer. | JPL · 22275 |
| 22276 Belkin | 1982 UH_{9} | Anatoly Pavlovich Belkin, Russian painter. | JPL · 22276 |
| 22277 Hirado | 1982 VK_{4} | Hirado is a town in Nagasaki Prefecture, Japan. The Portuguese arrived in 1550, and during the early Edo period (beginning in 1603) Hirado became a center of trade with Portugal, the Netherlands and England. | JPL · 22277 |
| 22278 Protitch | 1983 RT_{3} | Milorad B. Protić, Serbian astronomer. | JPL · 22278 |
| 22280 Mandragora | 1985 CD_{2} | a genus belonging to the nightshade family (Solanaceae). Members of the genus are known as mandrakes. They are perennial herbaceous plants, with large tap-roots and leaves in the form of a rosette. Individual flowers are bell-shaped, whitish through to violet, and are followed by yellow or orange berries. | JPL · 22280 |
| 22281 Popescu | 1985 PC | Marcel Popescu (born 1983), a specialist in asteroid spectroscopy at the Astronomical Institute of the Romanian Academy in Bucharest. | JPL · 22281 |
| 22282 Dreyer | 1985 RA | John Louis Emil Dreyer, Danish astronomer and historian of astronomy. | IAU · 22282 |
| 22283 Pytheas | 1986 PY | Pytheas (fl. 4th century BC) was a geographer from the Greek colony of Massalia (Marseille) | JPL · 22283 |
| 22291 Heitifer | 1989 CH_{5} | Heinrich (born 1998), Tibère (born 1999) and Ferdinand (born 2000), the three grandsons of German discoverer Freimut Börngen | JPL · 22291 |
| 22292 Mosul | 1989 SM_{1} | Mosul is a city on the Tigris in northern Iraq, 400 km north of Baghdad. The area of Mosul was a part of Assyria from the 25th century BCE. Famous for its Grand Mosque, Mosul's craftsmen were admired for their metalwork, using gold and silver for inlay on bronze and brass. | JPL · 22292 |
| 22294 Simmons | 1989 SC_{8} | Michael ("Mike") S. Simmons, American amateur astronomer who assisted in organizing the photographic glass plate archive of the 1.2-m Schmidt Oschin Telescope at Palomar Observatory | JPL · 22294 |
| 22299 Georgesteiner | 1990 GS | George Steiner, French-American author, essayist, and literary critic. | JPL · 22299 |

== 22301–22400 ==
back to top

| Named minor planet | Provisional | This minor planet was named for... | Ref; Catalog |
|---|---|---|---|
| 22312 Kelly | 1991 GW_{1} | Thomas J. Kelly (1929–2002), an American aerospace engineer and chief engineer of the Apollo Lunar Module. Considered the "Father of the LM", he and his Grumman Aerospace engineering team oversaw the design, construction and testing of each of the spacecraft that safely landed twelve men on the Moon. | JPL · 22312 |
| 22322 Bodensee | 1991 RQ_{4} | Lake Constance (German: Bodensee), is a border sea of the Alps, adjoining Germany, Switzerland and Austria. The river Rhine flows through it. It is an old cultivated and cultural landscape. The name was suggested by co-discoverer Freimut Börngen. | JPL · 22322 |
| 22338 Janemojo | 1992 LE | Morris Jones and his wife Jane, astronomers. | MPC · 22338 |
| 22341 Francispoulenc | 1992 PF | Francis Poulenc (1899–1963), French composer. He put to music poetry from the avant-garde poets Apollinaire, Eluard and Aragon. His most popular song is Les Chemins de l'amour (1940). Poulenc's religious devotion led to compositions such as Stabat Mater (1950) and Dialogues of the Carmelites (1953). | JPL · 22341 |
| 22346 Katsumatatakashi | 1992 SY_{12} | Takashi Katsumata (born 1952) is a professor of Nagasaki University and author of many articles on Japanese mythology related to stars. | JPL · 22346 |
| 22347 Mishinatakashi | 1992 SE_{13} | Takashi Mishina (born 1953) is a Japanese editor of natural science and an illustrator. | JPL · 22347 |
| 22348 Schmeidler | 1992 SA_{17} | Felix Schmeidler (1920–2008), a German astronomer at the Munich Observatory (532) for many years and professor at LMU Munich. He is known for his contributions to classical astronomy and the history of astronomy. The name was suggested by co-discoverer Lutz Schmadel. | JPL · 22348 |
| 22351 Yamashitatoshiki | 1992 UT_{2} | Toshiki Yamashita (born 1934) is a Japanese high school physics teacher. He has undertaken 43 expeditions to view total and annular solar eclipses. | IAU · 22351 |
| 22352 Fujiwarakenjiro | 1992 UP_{3} | Kenjiro Fujiwara (1894–1910) was a childhood friend of Japanese novelist Kenji Miyazawa whose fantasy novel Night on the Galactic Railroad depicts a protagonist based on Kenjiro. | IAU · 22352 |
| 22354 Sposetti | 1992 UR_{8} | Stefano Sposetti (born 1958), a Swiss amateur astronomer and teacher who lives in the country's Italian-speaking part in the Lepontine Alps. Since his youth he has been a very active observer of minor planets, comets, artificial satellites and meteors. He is also a helpful friend to budding young amateur astrometrists. | MPC · 22354 |
| 22355 Yahabananshozan | 1992 WD_{1} | Yahabananshozan is the name of a 848-meter mountain in Iwate Prefecture of Japan. It appears in Kenji Miyazawa's famous story "Taneyamagahara no Yoru" ("The Night of Taneyamagahara"). | JPL · 22355 |
| 22356 Feyerabend | 1992 WS_{6} | Paul Feyerabend (1924–1994) was a philosopher who criticized the scientific method, proposing instead that scientists use any method that works in their research | JPL · 22356 |
| 22366 Flettner | 1993 MT | Anton Flettner (1885–1961) was a German aviation engineer and inventor. He made important contributions to airplane and helicopter design. Name suggested by R. Jedicke and P. Jedicke. | JPL · 22366 |
| 22369 Klinger | 1993 SE_{3} | Max Klinger (1857–1920), German sculptor, painter and etcher † | MPC · 22369 |
| 22370 Italocalvino | 1993 TJ_{2} | Italo Calvino (1923–1985), an Italian writer and novelist who produced fantastic tales such as The Cloven Viscount (1952), The Baron in the Trees (1957) and The Nonexistent Knight (1959). His Le cosmicomiche is a stream-of-consciousness narrative that treats the creation and evolution of the Universe. | JPL · 22370 |
| 22378 Gaherty | 1994 AY_{10} | Geoff Gaherty (born 1941) is an amateur astronomer who writes about observing and won the Chant Medal of the Royal Astronomical Society of Canada in 2008. | JPL · 22378 |
| 22379 Montale | 1994 CO_{1} | Eugenio Montale (1896–1981) an Italian poet who received the 1975 Nobel Prize in Literature. He was also an editor, translator, and prose writer. | IAU · 22379 |
| 22383 Nikolauspacassi | 1994 EL | Nikolaus Franz Leonhard von Pacassi (1716–1790) was an Austrian architect of Italian origin. | JPL · 22383 |
| 22385 Fujimoriboshi | 1994 EK_{7} | The Tokyo Metropolitan Fujimori High school, where co-discoverer Masanori Hirasawa teaches astronomy and Earth science. It is one of the traditional high schools in the Tokyo Tama area. The naming took place on the occasion of the school's 70th anniversary. | JPL · 22385 |
| 22394 Kondouakira | 1994 TO | Akira Kondou (born 1943) has been director of the Saga City Hoshizora Astronomy Center since 2016. He is a widely respected astronomy scholar and a keen popularizer of astronomy in Japan. | JPL · 22394 |
| 22395 Ourakenji | 1994 TD_{3} | Kenji Oura (born 1965) is the director of the Kanoya City Planetarium, Kagoshima prefecture, Japan. He organizes local star parties for amateur astronomers and lay persons alike. | JPL · 22395 |
| 22397 Minobe | 1994 VV_{2} | Tatsuo Minobe (born 1946), Japanese astronomer and director of the Tachibana Observatory in Miyakonojō, Miyazaki Prefecture, Japan | IAU · 22397 |

== 22401–22500 ==
back to top

| Named minor planet | Provisional | This minor planet was named for... | Ref; Catalog |
|---|---|---|---|
| 22401 Egisto | 1995 DP_{3} | Egisto Masotti (born 1944), amateur astronomer in the Montelupo group of amateur astronomers. | JPL · 22401 |
| 22402 Goshi | 1995 GN | Goshi Nakamura (born 2001), whose initials are those of the provisional designation of this minor planet, is the son of the discoverer. | JPL · 22402 |
| 22403 Manjitludher | 1995 LK | Manjit Kaur Ludher, Deputy President of the Sikh Women's Awareness Network Society in Malaysia. | JPL · 22403 |
| 22404 Skujytė | 1995 ME_{4} | Austra Skujytė, retired Lithuanian athlete. | IAU · 22404 |
| 22405 Gavioliremo | 1995 OB | Remo Gavioli, Italian amateur astronomer, founding member of the G. Montanari Astronomical Society (Associazione Astronomica G. Montanari) in Cavezzo (Modena), Italy. | JPL · 22405 |
| 22406 Garyboyle | 1995 QW_{5} | Gary Boyle (born 1957) is a Canadian amateur astronomer who leads club activities, runs outreach events, teaches a college course and writes a stargazing column. | JPL · 22406 |
| 22409 Nagatohideaki | 1995 SU_{3} | Hideaki Nagato (born 1943) opened a nursery school and become its principal in Komatsu City, Ishikawa Prefecture, Japan. The school started with six children but now serves more than a thousand children. | IAU · 22409 |
| 22410 Grinspoon | 1995 SS_{52} | David Grinspoon (born 1959), an astrobiologist at the Southwest Research Institute, won the 2006 Carl Sagan Medal and wrote the award-winning book Lonely Planets. Name suggested by R. Jedicke and P. Jedicke. | JPL · 22410 |
| 22413 Haifu | 1995 UB_{13} | Hai Fu (born 1982) received his Ph.D. from the University of Hawaii and then worked at the University of Iowa, researching how galaxies evolve. Name suggested by R. and P. Jedicke. | JPL · 22413 |
| 22414 Hornschemeier | 1995 UB_{15} | At NASA-Goddard, Ann Hornschemeier (born 1975) specializes in studies of X-ray emission from star formation in galaxies at cosmologically interesting distances. Name suggested by R. and P. Jedicke | JPL · 22414 |
| 22415 Humeivey | 1995 UB_{21} | James Nairn Patterson Hume (1923–2013) and Donald Glenn Ivey (1922-2018) were physics educators, best known for their award-winning 1960 film Frames of Reference. Name suggested by R. and P. Jedicke. | JPL · 22415 |
| 22416 Tanimotoyoshi | 1995 UC_{47} | Motoyoshi Tani (born 1945) is a well-known astronomy popularizer in Osaka. His interests include the design of astronomical telescopes, observational instruments, and astronomical observatories. | IAU · 22416 |
| 22420 Xinanlianda | 1995 WL_{42} | National Southwestern Associated University (Xinan Lianda) was a public university in Kunming, China, from 1938–1946 | IAU · 22420 |
| 22421 Jamesedgar | 1995 XC_{5} | James Somerville Edgar (born 1946) spent 40 years as a Locomotive Engineer and rail Supervisor. He became President of the Royal Astronomical Society of Canada in 2014. Name suggested by R. and P. Jedicke | JPL · 22421 |
| 22422 Kenmount Hill | 1995 YO_{5} | Kenmount Hill (47°31' N, 52°47' W) is the location near St. John's, Newfoundland, where John Winthrop of Harvard College observed the transit of Venus in 1761. Name suggested by R. and P. Jedicke. | JPL · 22422 |
| 22423 Kudlacek | 1995 YJ_{12} | Trina Kudlacek (born 1967) is a long-term volunteer with the University of Hawaii's Friends of the Institute for Astronomy, who helped arrange eclipse expeditions. Name suggested by R. and P. Jedicke. | JPL · 22423 |
| 22426 Mikehanes | 1996 AH_{9} | Michael Francis Hanes (born 1959) was a pilot for Air Canada, an amateur astronomer and telescope maker with the Royal Astronomical Society of Canada, London Centre. Name suggested by R. and P. Jedicke. | JPL · 22426 |
| 22429 Jurašek | 1996 DD_{1} | Pavel "Balvan" Jurašek (1955–2008) was a professional meteorologist and since 2006 director of the Slovak Hydrometeorological Institute in Košice). Interested in observing meteors, he was a member of the Slovak Union of Amateur Astronomers and the Slovak Astronomical Society | JPL · 22429 |
| 22432 Pamgriffin | 1996 EJ_{14} | Pamela Defreyn Griffin (born 1966) obtained a B.Sc. in Geological Engineering in 1989 and is active in the University of Hawaii's "Friends of the IfA". | JPL · 22432 |
| 22434 Peredery | 1996 GE_{6} | Walter Volodymyr Peredery (born 1938) is a retired Canadian geologist who studied the Sudbury, Ontario, area and developed the view that it is an impact basin. Name suggested by P. and R. Jedicke. | JPL · 22434 |
| 22435 Pierfederici | 1996 GN_{7} | Francesco Pierfederici (born 1973) developed software for the Pan-STARRS moving object processing system and Large Synoptic Survey Telescope. Name suggested by P. and R. Jedicke. | JPL · 22435 |
| 22440 Bangsgaard | 1996 KA | Nicolai Bangsgaard (born 1976) is a Danish traveller and biker, who spent 1413 days cycling around the world, visiting 53 countries on six continents | JPL · 22440 |
| 22442 Blaha | 1996 TM_{9} | John Elmer Blaha, American astronaut † | MPC · 22442 |
| 22446 Philwhitney | 1996 TU_{25} | Phil Whitney (born 1927) has long supported astronomy in Hawaii and organized events for the University of Hawaii's "Friends of the Institute for Astronomy". Name suggested by P. and R. Jedicke. | JPL · 22446 |
| 22448 Ricksaunders | 1996 TP_{35} | John Richard Saunders (born 1946) makes astronomy accessories and began a term as President of the Royal Astronomical Society of Canada, London Centre, in 2012. Name suggested by P. and R. Jedicke. | JPL · 22448 |
| 22449 Ottijeff | 1996 VC | Ottilie Malfliet (born 1944) and Jeffrey Levine (born 1948) are the parents of the discoverer's wife. | JPL · 22449 |
| 22450 Nové Hrady | 1996 VN | Nové Hrady, south Bohemia, near the Czech–Austrian border † ‡ | MPC · 22450 |
| 22451 Tymothycoons | 1996 VN_{6} | Tymothy Alan Coons (born 1955) is a pilot, flight engineer and inspector based in Tucson, Arizona, where he maintains various aircraft. One of his favorite jobs in Aereospace was at the Ballistic Missile Early Warning Site in Thule, Greenland: the purpose of this powerful radar was to look for objects in earth orbit | JPL · 22451 |
| 22453 Shibusawaeiichi | 1996 VC_{9} | Shibusawa Eiichi (1840–1931), called the "father of the modern Japanese economy", was involved in the founding of almost 500 companies and promoted economic development in Japan. He also poured his efforts into social welfare, social public enterprises and international relations around the turn of the 20th century. | IAU · 22453 |
| 22454 Rosalylopes | 1996 VU_{17} | A member of the Cassini Titan Radar Mapper Team at JPL, Rosaly M. C. Lopes-Gautier (born 1957) studies geology and volcanology. She discovered 71 volcanoes on Io. | JPL · 22454 |
| 22456 Salopek | 1996 XF_{12} | David Stephen Salopek (born 1963) earned a Ph.D. in cosmology from the University of Toronto in 1989 and worked at the Universities of Cambridge and Alberta. | JPL · 22456 |
| 22465 Karelanděl | 1997 AK_{18} | Karel Anděl, Czech astronomer and selenographer † | MPC · 22465 |
| 22467 Koharumi | 1997 BC_{3} | Kobayashi Harumi, Japanese master of the tea ceremony and an observing partner of the discoverer (this minor planet was detected on the same night as the comet P/1997 B1 (Kobayashi)) | JPL · 22467 |
| 22469 Poloniny | 1997 CP_{1} | Poloniny is the first dark sky protected area in Slovakia, proclaimed on 2010 December 3, located in the Poloniny National Park. | JPL · 22469 |
| 22470 Shirakawa-go | 1997 CR_{21} | Shirakawa-go is the village located on the border of Gifu Prefecture and Toyama Prefecture, Japan. It is famous for its big houses with thatched rafter roofs and was along with Gokayama registered as World Heritage Sites in 1995. | JPL · 22470 |
| 22473 Stanleyhey | 1997 EN_{4} | James Stanley Hey (1909–2000), a British radar engineer. | JPL · 22473 |
| 22474 Frobenius | 1997 ED_{8} | Georg Ferdinand Frobenius (1849–1917), a professor at the University of Berlin. | JPL · 22474 |
| 22475 Stanrunge | 1997 EH_{13} | Stanley Edward John Runge (born 1956) is an experienced amateur astronomer and an active member of the Royal Astronomical Society of Canada, Winnipeg Centre. Name suggested by R. and P. Jedicke. | JPL · 22475 |
| 22477 Julimacoraor | 1997 EU_{42} | Juliana Mathea Coraor (born 1995) is a finalist in the 2012 Intel Science Talent Search, a science competition for high-school seniors, for her physics and space-science project. | JPL · 22477 |
| 22480 Maedatoshihisa | 1997 GU_{3} | Toshihisa Maeda (born 1963) is a Japanese amateur radio astronomer and president of the Kagoshima Astronomical Society ("Kagoshimaken Tenmon Kyoukai"), and an observer of variable stars. He is a high school teacher by profession. | IAU · 22480 |
| 22481 Zachlynn | 1997 GM_{13} | Zach Lynn mentored a finalist in the 2012 Intel Science Talent Search, a science competition for high-school seniors. | JPL · 22481 |
| 22482 Michbertier | 1997 GK_{16} | Michelle Bertier mentored a finalist in the 2012 Intel Science Talent Search, a science competition for high-school seniors. JPL | MPC · 22482 |
| 22485 Unterman | 1997 GS_{22} | Nathan Unterman mentored a finalist in the 2012 Intel Science Talent Search, a science competition for high-school seniors. | JPL · 22485 |
| 22487 Megphillips | 1997 GP_{23} | Megan Phillips mentored a finalist in the 2012 Intel Science Talent Search, a science competition for high-school seniors. | JPL · 22487 |
| 22488 Martyschwartz | 1997 GP_{24} | Martin Schwartz mentored a finalist in the 2012 Intel Science Talent Search, a science competition for high-school seniors. | JPL · 22488 |
| 22489 Yanaka | 1997 GR_{24} | Tetsuo Yanaka (born 1954) is a post office clerk and amateur astronomer in Japan. | JPL · 22489 |
| 22490 Zigamiyama | 1997 GB_{26} | Zigamiyama is an 1850-meter mountain located in the western part of the Iide mountain range, in the Bandai-Asahi National Park. It is a popular area for Japanese mountain climbers | JPL · 22490 |
| 22492 Mosig | 1997 GN_{35} | Thomas Mosig mentored a finalist in the 2012 Intel Science Talent Search, a science competition for high-school seniors. | JPL · 22492 |
| 22494 Trillium | 1997 JL | Since 1937, the White Trillium (Trillium grandiflorum) has been the official flower of Canada's province of Ontario, where it is often found in forests. | JPL · 22494 |
| 22495 Fubini | 1997 JU_{3} | Guido Fubini (1879–1943), lecturer at the universities of Catania, Genoa and Turin. | JPL · 22495 |
| 22497 Immanuelfuchs | 1997 KG | Immanuel Lazarus Fuchs (1833–1902) received a doctorate from the University of Berlin and taught at various secondary schools and universities. His work was mostly in the study of solutions and singularities of homogeneous linear differential equations in the complex domain. JPL | MPC · 22497 |
| 22498 Willman | 1997 LY_{2} | Mark Willman (born 1952) received his Ph.D. in planetary astronomy from the University of Hawaii's Institute for Astronomy and began working with Pan-STARRS1 in 2013. JPL | MPC · 22498 |
| 22499 Wunibaldkamm | 1997 MP_{9} | Wunibald Kamm (1893–1966) developed aerodynamic designs that reduce turbulence at high speeds for automobiles, including the widely seen Kammback or Kamm-tail. | JPL · 22499 |
| 22500 Grazianoventre | 1997 OJ | Graziano Ventre (born 1954) is an active member of the Osservatorio Astronomico Sormano and from his personal observatory, near his home in Bellagio (Italy), he obtains astrometric positions of comets and pictures of deep sky objects. He is a discoverer of minor planets. | JPL · 22500 |

== 22501–22600 ==
back to top

| Named minor planet | Provisional | This minor planet was named for... | Ref; Catalog |
|---|---|---|---|
| 22503 Thalpius | 1997 TB_{12} | Thalpius, son of Eurytus, leader of the Elean flotilla against Troy and one of those aboard the wooden horse † | MPC · 22503 |
| 22505 Lewit | 1997 UF | Since 1946, Karel Lewit (born 1916) has worked in leading Prague teaching hospitals, developing and propagating modern methods of rehabilitation and manual medicine, teaching and training specialists in that field at home and abroad. | JPL · 22505 |
| 22512 Cannat | 1998 BH_{26} | Guillaume Cannat, French scientific journalist and author of several books, including the annual Guide du ciel | JPL · 22512 |
| 22517 Alexzanardi | 1998 DX_{32} | Alex Zanardi (born 1966) is a former Formula 1 driver, 1997/1998 CART champion and 2005 Italian Superturismo Champion. After being seriously injured in a race in 2001, he turned to parathletics, winning two gold and one silver medals in handcycling at both the 2012 London and 2016 Rio Paralympics. | JPL · 22517 |
| 22519 Gerardklein | 1998 EC_{2} | Gérard Klein, French movie and television actor | JPL · 22519 |
| 22521 ZZ Top | 1998 ER_{2} | A power trio from Texas, ZZ Top was formed in 1969. Bearded Billy Gibbons (guitar and vocals) and Dusty Hill (bass and vocals), and beardless Frank Beard (percussion) produce energetic music that was used to close the dome of the OCA Schmidt telescope after a long night of observing | JPL · 22521 |
| 22526 Gonzálezsuárez | 1998 FV_{15} | Juan José González Suárez from Oviedo, Spain, a well-known visual observer of comets and a speleologist and geologist who has immense knowledge of the Cantabrian mountains | IAU · 22526 |
| 22527 Gawlik | 1998 FG_{20} | Evan Scott Gawlik, American finalist in the 2006 Intel Science Talent Search (ISTS) | JPL · 22527 |
| 22528 Elysehope | 1998 FH_{34} | Elyse Autumn Hope, American finalist in the 2006 Intel Science Talent Search (ISTS) | JPL · 22528 |
| 22530 Huynh-Le | 1998 FY_{41} | Minh-Phuong Huynh-Le, American finalist in the 2006 Intel Science Talent Search (ISTS) | JPL · 22530 |
| 22531 Davidkelley | 1998 FN_{43} | David Bruce Kelley, American finalist in the 2006 Intel Science Talent Search (ISTS) | JPL · 22531 |
| 22533 Krishnan | 1998 FX_{47} | Sheela Krishnan, American finalist in the 2006 Intel Science Talent Search (ISTS) | JPL · 22533 |
| 22534 Lieblich | 1998 FF_{57} | Jerrold Alexander Lieblich, American finalist in the 2006 Intel Science Talent Search (ISTS) | JPL · 22534 |
| 22536 Katelowry | 1998 FY_{61} | Kate Elizabeth Lowry, American finalist in the 2006 Intel Science Talent Search (ISTS) | JPL · 22536 |
| 22537 Meyerowitz | 1998 FB_{62} | Eric Allan Meyerowitz, American finalist in the 2006 Intel Science Talent Search (ISTS) | JPL · 22537 |
| 22538 Lucasmoller | 1998 FS_{63} | Lucas Edward Moller, American finalist in the 2006 Intel Science Talent Search (ISTS) | JPL · 22538 |
| 22540 Mork | 1998 FZ_{67} | Anna Jolene Mork, American finalist in the 2006 Intel Science Talent Search (ISTS) | JPL · 22540 |
| 22542 Pendri | 1998 FG_{71} | Kiran Reddy Pendri, American finalist in the 2006 Intel Science Talent Search (ISTS) | JPL · 22542 |
| 22543 Ranjan | 1998 FA_{75} | Sukrit Ranjan, American finalist in the 2006 Intel Science Talent Search (ISTS) | JPL · 22543 |
| 22544 Sarahrapo | 1998 FL_{75} | Sarah Kate Rapoport, American finalist in the 2006 Intel Science Talent Search (ISTS) | JPL · 22544 |
| 22545 Brittrusso | 1998 FP_{77} | Brittany Nicole Russo, American finalist in the 2006 Intel Science Talent Search (ISTS) | JPL · 22545 |
| 22546 Schickler | 1998 FK_{78} | Carmiel Effron Schickler, American finalist in the 2006 Intel Science Talent Search (ISTS) | JPL · 22546 |
| 22547 Kimberscott | 1998 FO_{78} | Kimberly Megan Scott, American finalist in the 2006 Intel Science Talent Search (ISTS) | JPL · 22547 |
| 22550 Jonsellon | 1998 FK_{106} | Jonathan Blake Sellon, American finalist in the 2006 Intel Science Talent Search (ISTS) | JPL · 22550 |
| 22551 Adamsolomon | 1998 FU_{110} | Adam Ross Solomon, American finalist in the 2006 Intel Science Talent Search (ISTS) | JPL · 22551 |
| 22553 Yisun | 1998 FS_{116} | Yi Sun, American finalist in the 2006 Intel Science Talent Search (ISTS) | JPL · 22553 |
| 22554 Shoshanatell | 1998 FC_{118} | Shoshana Sophie Rothman Tell, American finalist in the 2006 Intel Science Talent Search (ISTS) | JPL · 22554 |
| 22555 Joevellone | 1998 FU_{118} | Joseph Daniel Vellone, American finalist in the 2006 Intel Science Talent Search (ISTS) | JPL · 22555 |
| 22558 Mladen | 1998 HH_{3} | Mladen Kolény Sr., father of the first discoverer, and Mladen Kolény Jr., his brother | JPL · 22558 |
| 22561 Miviscardi | 1998 HX_{18} | Michael Anthony Viscardi, American finalist in the 2006 Intel Science Talent Search (ISTS) | JPL · 22561 |
| 22562 Wage | 1998 HC_{19} | Nicholas Michael Wage, American finalist in the 2006 Intel Science Talent Search (ISTS) | JPL · 22562 |
| 22563 Xinwang | 1998 HQ_{19} | Xin Wang, American finalist in the 2006 Intel Science Talent Search (ISTS) | JPL · 22563 |
| 22564 Jeffreyxing | 1998 HP_{29} | Jeffrey Chunlong Xing, American finalist in the 2006 Intel Science Talent Search (ISTS) | JPL · 22564 |
| 22566 Irazaitseva | 1998 HY_{31} | Irina Vladimirovna Zaitseva, American finalist in the 2006 Intel Science Talent Search (ISTS) | JPL · 22566 |
| 22567 Zenisek | 1998 HK_{33} | Sergio-Francis Mellejor Zenisek, American finalist in the 2006 Intel Science Talent Search (ISTS) | JPL · 22567 |
| 22570 Harleyzhang | 1998 HN_{38} | Harley Huiyu Zhang, American finalist in the 2006 Intel Science Talent Search (ISTS) | JPL · 22570 |
| 22571 Letianzhang | 1998 HA_{39} | Letian Zhang, American finalist in the 2006 Intel Science Talent Search (ISTS) | JPL · 22571 |
| 22572 Yuanzhang | 1998 HJ_{39} | Yuan Zhang, American finalist in the 2006 Intel Science Talent Search (ISTS) | JPL · 22572 |
| 22573 Johnzhou | 1998 HY_{43} | John Cong Zhou, American finalist in the 2006 Intel Science Talent Search (ISTS) | JPL · 22573 |
| 22575 Jayallen | 1998 HC_{46} | Jay Allen, American mentor of a 2006 Intel Science Talent Search (ISTS) finalist | JPL · 22575 |
| 22577 Alfiuccio | 1998 HT_{51} | Alfio ("Alfiuccio") Grasso (1992–2004) died tragically at the age of twelve in a hunting accident on the slopes of Mt. Etna. The name was suggested by C. Blanco and M. Di Martino | JPL · 22577 |
| 22579 Marcyeager | 1998 HO_{62} | Marcy Eager, American mentor of a 2006 Intel Science Talent Search (ISTS) finalist | JPL · 22579 |
| 22580 Kenkaplan | 1998 HB_{67} | Kenneth Kaplan, American mentor of a 2006 Intel Science Talent Search (ISTS) finalist | JPL · 22580 |
| 22581 Rosahemphill | 1998 HH_{77} | Rosa Hemphill, American mentor of a 2006 Intel Science Talent Search (ISTS) finalist | JPL · 22581 |
| 22582 Patmiller | 1998 HD_{82} | Patricia Miller, American mentor of a 2006 Intel Science Talent Search (ISTS) finalist | JPL · 22582 |
| 22583 Metzler | 1998 HL_{86} | William Metzler, American mentor of a 2006 Intel Science Talent Search (ISTS) finalist | JPL · 22583 |
| 22584 Winigleason | 1998 HP_{88} | Winifred Gleason, American mentor of a 2006 Intel Science Talent Search (ISTS) finalist | JPL · 22584 |
| 22586 Shellyhynes | 1998 HC_{96} | Shelly Hynes, American mentor of a 2006 Intel Science Talent Search (ISTS) finalist | JPL · 22586 |
| 22587 McKennon | 1998 HB_{99} | Blanche McKennon, American mentor of a 2006 Intel Science Talent Search (ISTS) finalist | JPL · 22587 |
| 22589 Minor | 1998 HY_{100} | Tom Minor, American mentor of a 2006 Intel Science Talent Search (ISTS) finalist | JPL · 22589 |
| 22594 Stoops | 1998 HT_{107} | Tracy Stoops, American mentor of a 2006 Intel Science Talent Search (ISTS) finalist | JPL · 22594 |
| 22596 Kathwallace | 1998 HB_{114} | Kathleen Wallace, American mentor of a 2006 Intel Science Talent Search (ISTS) finalist | JPL · 22596 |
| 22597 Lynzielinski | 1998 HM_{117} | Lynne Zielinski, American mentor of a 2006 Intel Science Talent Search (ISTS) finalist | JPL · 22597 |
| 22598 Francespearl | 1998 HO_{117} | Frances Pearlmutter, American mentor of a 2006 Intel Science Talent Search (ISTS) finalist | JPL · 22598 |
| 22599 Heatherhall | 1998 HR_{122} | Heather Hall, American mentor of a 2006 Intel Science Talent Search (ISTS) finalist | JPL · 22599 |

== 22601–22700 ==
back to top

| Named minor planet | Provisional | This minor planet was named for... | Ref; Catalog |
|---|---|---|---|
| 22603 Davidoconnor | 1998 HK_{133} | David O'Connor, American mentor of a 2006 Intel Science Talent Search (ISTS) finalist | JPL · 22603 |
| 22605 Steverumsey | 1998 HH_{147} | Stephen Rumsey, American mentor of a 2006 Intel Science Talent Search (ISTS) finalist | JPL · 22605 |
| 22611 Galerkin | 1998 KB | Boris Grigorievich Galerkin (1871–1945) studied engineering in his native Russia and abroad. His scientific work centered on various problems in the theory of elasticity and structural mechanics, in particular the curvature of thin plates and the torsion and flexure of prismatic rods. | JPL · 22611 |
| 22612 Dandibner | 1998 KT_{3} | Daniel Dibner (born 1955) is director of philanthropy of the Cascade Foundation. A Sloan Fellow at the Massachusetts Institute of Technology, he has specialized in the history of science. He has also been an executive at several software and technology companies | JPL · 22612 |
| 22613 Callander | 1998 KP_{4} | Thomas Callander Price Zimmermann (born 1934) has been professor of renaissance history at Reed College (Oregon) and Davidson College (North Carolina). He is a past president of the American Alpine Club, where he helped organize Club policy on access to mountain recreation areas | JPL · 22613 |
| 22616 Bogolyubov | 1998 KG_{7} | Nikolai Nikolaevich Bogolyubov (1909–1992) was a Russian and Ukrainian Soviet mathematician and theoretical physicist known for his work in statistical field theory and dynamical systems. He was awarded the Dirac Medal in 1992. The name was suggested by K. I. Churyumov | JPL · 22616 |
| 22617 Vidphananu | 1998 KH_{7} | The name Vidphananu is a Ukrainian abbreviation for the Department of Physics and Astronomy of the National Academy of Sciences of Ukraine, which was created in Kiev in 1918. The name was suggested by K. I. Churyumov | JPL · 22617 |
| 22618 Silva Nortica | 1998 KK_{9} | Silva Nortica, "Northern Forest", ancient Latin name of the territory on the borders of South Bohemia and Lower Austria | JPL · 22618 |
| 22619 Ajscheetz | 1998 KJ_{10} | Alfred J. Scheetz, American mentor of a 2006 Intel Science Talent Search (ISTS) finalist | JPL · 22619 |
| 22621 Larrybartel | 1998 KO_{28} | Larry Bartel, American mentor of a 2006 Intel Science Talent Search (ISTS) finalist | JPL · 22621 |
| 22622 Strong | 1998 KV_{32} | Joshua Strong, American mentor of a 2006 Intel Science Talent Search (ISTS) finalist | JPL · 22622 |
| 22623 Fisico | 1998 KR_{34} | Misael Fisico, American mentor of a 2006 Intel Science Talent Search (ISTS) finalist | JPL · 22623 |
| 22625 Kanipe | 1998 KB_{36} | Linda Kanipe, American mentor of a 2006 Intel Science Talent Search (ISTS) finalist | JPL · 22625 |
| 22626 Jengordinier | 1998 KS_{37} | Jennifer Gordinier, American mentor of a 2006 Intel Science Talent Search (ISTS) finalist | JPL · 22626 |
| 22627 Aviscardi | 1998 KM_{39} | Anthony Viscardi, American mentor of a 2006 Intel Science Talent Search (ISTS) finalist | JPL · 22627 |
| 22628 Michaelallen | 1998 KV_{39} | Michael Allen, American mentor of a 2006 Intel Science Talent Search (ISTS) finalist | JPL · 22628 |
| 22630 Wallmuth | 1998 KH_{45} | Joanne Wallmuth, American mentor of a 2006 Intel Science Talent Search (ISTS) finalist | JPL · 22630 |
| 22631 Dillard | 1998 KV_{47} | Linda Dillard, American mentor of a 2006 Intel Science Talent Search (ISTS) finalist | JPL · 22631 |
| 22632 DiNovis | 1998 KG_{64} | Joanne DiNovis, American mentor of a 2006 Intel Science Talent Search (ISTS) finalist | JPL · 22632 |
| 22633 Fazio | 1998 KK_{64} | Marc Fazio, American mentor of a 2006 Intel Science Talent Search (ISTS) finalist | JPL · 22633 |
| 22638 Abdulla | 1998 MS_{31} | Almas Ugurgizi Abdulla (born 1993) is a finalist in the 2006 Discovery Channel Young Scientist Challenge (DCYSC), a middle school science competition, for her mathematics project. She attends the Stone Middle School, Melbourne, Florida | JPL · 22638 |
| 22639 Nickanthony | 1998 MP_{32} | Nick Alan Anthony (born 1993) is a finalist in the 2006 Discovery Channel Young Scientist Challenge (DCYSC), a middle school science competition, for his biochemistry, medicine, health, and microbiology project. He attends the Three Oaks Middle School, Ft. Myers, Florida | JPL · 22639 |
| 22640 Shalilabaena | 1998 MJ_{34} | Shalila Alejandra Baena (born 1994) is a finalist in the 2006 Discovery Channel Young Scientist Challenge (DCYSC), a middle school science competition, for her botany and zoology project. She attends the Haaheo Elementary School, Hilo, Hawaii | JPL · 22640 |
| 22644 Matejbel | 1998 OZ_{4} | Matej Bel (1684–1749), Slovak historian and a great scholar of the eighteenth century | JPL · 22644 |
| 22645 Rotblat | 1998 OT_{6} | Joseph Rotblat (1908–2005) was a Nobel Peace Prize laureate in 1995 for his efforts toward nuclear disarmament. A signatory to the 1955 Russell-Einstein manifesto, he was the guiding spirit of the Pugwash Conferences on Science and World Affairs and helped prevent the use of nuclear weapons during the Cold War | JPL · 22645 |
| 22647 Lévi-Strauss | 1998 OR_{8} | French anthropologist and ethnologist Claude Lévi-Strauss (1908–2009) introduced structuralism as the basis of human perception. Disillusioned with the study of philosophy at the Sorbonne, he went in 1935 to Brazil, where his research on Indian tribes culminated in Tristes Tropiques (1955) and La Pensée Sauvage (1962) | JPL · 22647 |
| 22649 Paulineloader | 1998 OD_{12} | Pauline Loader, former Secretary and Treasurer of the Royal Astronomical Society of New Zealand. | IAU · 22649 |
| 22650 Brianloader | 1998 OG_{12} | Brian Loader, retired science teacher who worked as a programmer at the USNO Black Birch Station in New Zealand. | IAU · 22650 |
| 22656 Aaronburrows | 1998 QV_{7} | Aaron Phillip Burrows (born 1992) is a finalist in the 2006 Discovery Channel Young Scientist Challenge (DCYSC), a middle school science competition, for his botany and zoology project. He attends the Bradley Middle School, San Antonio, Texas | JPL · 22656 |
| 22666 Josephchurch | 1998 QE_{24} | Joseph Christopher Church (born 1992) is a finalist in the 2006 Discovery Channel Young Scientist Challenge (DCYSC), a middle school science competition, for his engineering project. He attends the Alice Deal Junior High School, Washington, District of Columbia | JPL · 22666 |
| 22675 Davidcohn | 1998 QZ_{39} | David Milton Cohn III (born 1992) is a finalist in the 2006 Discovery Channel Young Scientist Challenge (DCYSC), a middle school science competition, for his environmental sciences project. He attends the Rhoades School, Encinitas, California | JPL · 22675 |
| 22679 Amydavid | 1998 QJ_{42} | Amy Jane David (born 1991) is a finalist in the 2006 Discovery Channel Young Scientist Challenge (DCYSC), a middle school science competition, for her environmental sciences project. She attends the Pinedale Middle School, Pinedale, Wyoming | JPL · 22679 |
| 22685 Dominguez | 1998 QL_{51} | Isabella Rosa Dominguez (born 1991) is a finalist in the 2006 Discovery Channel Young Scientist Challenge (DCYSC), a middle school science competition, for her botany and zoology project. She attends the Key Biscayne Elementary School, Miami, Florida | JPL · 22685 |
| 22686 Mishchenko | 1998 QL_{53} | Michael Ivanovich Mischenko (born 1959), of the NASA Goddard Institute for Space Studies, studies electromagnetic scattering. He has developed a new branch of statistical optics based on numerically exact solutions of Maxwell's equations | JPL · 22686 |
| 22692 Carfrekahl | 1998 QE_{99} | Caroline and Frederikke Kahl, granddaughters of Danish astronomer Leif Kahl Kristensen, a friend of the discoverer (the latter are both members of IAU Commission 20, Positions and Motions of Minor Planets, Comets and Satellites) | JPL · 22692 |
| 22694 Tyndall | 1998 QF_{104} | John Tyndall (1820–1893), an Irish natural philosopher and glaciologist who made fundamental investigations of the motion of glaciers, insisting that the flow is due to fracture and regelation. He is known for the Tyndall effect in suspensions. | JPL · 22694 |
| 22697 Mánek | 1998 RM | Jan Karel Mánek, Czech amateur astronomer. | JPL · 22697 |

== 22701–22800 ==
back to top

| Named minor planet | Provisional | This minor planet was named for... | Ref; Catalog |
|---|---|---|---|
| 22701 Cyannaskye | 1998 RO_{38} | Cyanna Skye Edwards (born 1992) is a finalist in the 2006 Discovery Channel Young Scientist Challenge (DCYSC), a middle school science competition, for her biochemistry, medicine, health, and microbiology project. She attends the Buckner Fanning Christian School, San Antonio, Texas | JPL · 22701 |
| 22705 Erinedwards | 1998 RF_{53} | Erin Nicole Edwards (born 1995) is a finalist in the 2006 Discovery Channel Young Scientist Challenge (DCYSC), a middle school science competition, for her physical science project. She attends the John Hancock Charter School, Pleasant Grove, Utah | JPL · 22705 |
| 22706 Ganguly | 1998 RT_{56} | Shilpi Ganguly (born 1994) is a finalist in the 2006 Discovery Channel Young Scientist Challenge (DCYSC), a middle school science competition, for her biochemistry, medicine, health, and microbiology project. She attends the Trailwood Elementary School, Overland Park, Kansas | JPL · 22706 |
| 22707 Jackgrundy | 1998 RN_{62} | Jack Mark Grundy (born 1993) is a finalist in the 2006 Discovery Channel Young Scientist Challenge (DCYSC), a middle school science competition, for his biochemistry, medicine, health, and microbiology project. He attends the St. Francis of Assisi School, Louisville, Kentucky | JPL · 22707 |
| 22717 Romeuf | 1998 SF_{13} | David Romeuf (born 1969), a French amateur astronomer who worked as a student at the OCA Schmidt telescope (910) in order to automate it, and is now research engineer at UCBL in Lyon, France. He has continued to work in pro-am astronomy and was project manager for the HACO-CLIMSO coronagraph at the Pic du Midi Observatory. | JPL · 22717 |
| 22719 Nakadori | 1998 SH_{25} | Nakadori is the central part of Fukushima prefecture, Japan, and is located between the Ōu Mountains and Abukuma highland. | JPL · 22719 |
| 22722 Timothycooper | 1998 SE_{54} | Timothy P. Cooper (born 1958), the Director of the Comet and Meteor Section of the Astronomical Society of Southern Africa. | JPL · 22722 |
| 22723 Edlopez | 1998 SS_{58} | As a research engineer, Edward ("Ed") B. Lopez III (1939–2010), created the first industrial robot to automate parcel sorting. His team designed the DIAD (Delivery Information Acquisition Device), a handheld data collector used to record and transmit delivery information | JPL · 22723 |
| 22724 Byatt | 1998 SE_{59} | Antonia Susan ("A. S.") Byatt (born 1936) is an English writer, well known for her novels and short stories. She is a winner of the Booker Prize for Fiction and became a Dame Commander of the Order of the British Empire in 1999 | JPL · 22724 |
| 22725 Drabble | 1998 SN_{62} | English writer Margaret Drabble (born 1939) has, among other works, published seventeen novels, has edited The Oxford Companion to English literature and is a biographer of Arnold Bennett and Angus Wilson. She became a Dame Commander of the Order of the British Empire in 2008 | JPL · 22725 |
| 22729 Anthennig | 1998 SV_{110} | Anthony Ian Hennig (born 1993) is a finalist in the 2006 Discovery Channel Young Scientist Challenge (DCYSC), a middle school science competition, for his physical science project. He attends the Powhatan Junior High School, Powhatan, Virginia | JPL · 22729 |
| 22730 Jacobhurwitz | 1998 SY_{118} | Jacob Benjamin Hurwitz (born 1992) is a finalist in the 2006 Discovery Channel Young Scientist Challenge (DCYSC), a middle school science competition, for his behavioral science project. He attends the Robert Frost Middle School, Rockville, Maryland | JPL · 22730 |
| 22732 Jakpor | 1998 SZ_{122} | Otana Agape Jakpor (born 1993) is a finalist in the 2006 Discovery Channel Young Scientist Challenge (DCYSC), a middle school science competition, for her biochemistry, medicine, health, and microbiology project. She attends the Woodcrest Christian School, Riverside, California | JPL · 22732 |
| 22734 Theojones | 1998 SQ_{133} | Theo Percy Jones (born 1993) is a finalist in the 2006 Discovery Channel Young Scientist Challenge (DCYSC), a middle school science competition, for his behavioral science project. He attends the Jones Home School, Tucson, Arizona | JPL · 22734 |
| 22736 Kamitaki | 1998 SM_{137} | Nolan M.K. Kamitaki (born 1992) is a finalist in the 2006 Discovery Channel Young Scientist Challenge (DCYSC), a middle school science competition, for his environmental sciences project. He attends the Waiakea Intermediate School, Hilo, Hawaii | JPL · 22736 |
| 22739 Sikhote-Alin | 1998 SA_{144} | Sikhote-Alin, a mountain range in eastern Siberia, extending about 900 km to the Russian Pacific. | JPL · 22739 |
| 22740 Rayleigh | 1998 SX_{146} | John William Rayleigh (1842–1919), an English physicist and Nobelist | JPL · 22740 |
| 22744 Esterantonucci | 1998 TB_{34} | Ester Antonucci (born 1945) is a solar physicist who has spent most of her career studying the sun using spacecraft. She participated in the Solar Maximum and SOHO missions and, since 2005, has been director of the Osservatorio Astronomico di Torino---the first woman to hold this position | JPL · 22744 |
| 22745 Rikuzentakata | 1998 TN_{34} | Rikuzentakata, a city in Iwate, Japan. | JPL · 22745 |
| 22752 Sabrinamasiero | 1998 VS_{34} | Sabrina Masiero (born 1970) is an astronomer and director of the educational popular science structure of the International Center for Astronomical Research GalHassin (Isnello, Sicily). GalHassin has achieved great success in the popularization of astronomy. | IAU · 22752 |
| 22754 Olympus | 1998 WJ_{8} | Mount Olympus is the highest point in Greece. The cloud-veiled summit, and the heavens above, were believed by the ancients to be the dwelling place of the gods. | JPL · 22754 |
| 22756 Manpreetkaur | 1998 WA_{10} | Manpreet Kaur (born 1992) is a finalist in the 2006 Discovery Channel Young Scientist Challenge (DCYSC), a middle school science competition, for her biochemistry, medicine, health, and microbiology project. She attends the Seabrook Intermediate School, Seabrook, Texas | JPL · 22756 |
| 22757 Klimcak | 1998 WF_{11} | Sophie Haruna Klimcak (born 1992) is a finalist in the 2006 Discovery Channel Young Scientist Challenge (DCYSC), a middle school science competition, for her botany and zoology project. She attends the Palos Verdes Intermediate School, Palos Verdes, California | JPL · 22757 |
| 22758 Lemp | 1998 WP_{18} | Nicholas Andrew Lemp (born 1993) is a finalist in the 2006 Discovery Channel Young Scientist Challenge (DCYSC), a middle school science competition, for his earth and space science project. He attends the Lemp Home School, Waterford, Michigan | JPL · 22758 |
| 22769 Aurelianora | 1999 BD_{4} | Aurelia (born 1989) and Nora Sposetti (1991–1991) Sposetti, daughters of Swiss amateur astronomer Stefano Sposetti, who discovered this minor planet. | MPC · 22769 |
| 22775 Jasonelloyd | 1999 CV_{20} | Jason Eric Lloyd (born 1992) is a finalist in the 2006 Discovery Channel Young Scientist Challenge (DCYSC), a middle school science competition, for his botany and zoology project. He attends the Bonaire Middle School, Bonaire, Georgia | JPL · 22775 |
| 22776 Matossian | 1999 CS_{24} | Mikael Hagop Matossian (born 1994) is a finalist in the 2006 Discovery Channel Young Scientist Challenge (DCYSC), a middle school science competition, for his environmental sciences project. He attends the A.G.B.U. Manoogian Demirdjan School, Canoga Par, California | JPL · 22776 |
| 22777 McAliley | 1999 CU_{29} | Collin Northcott McAliley (born 1993) is a finalist in the 2006 Discovery Channel Young Scientist Challenge (DCYSC), a middle school science competition, for his environmental sciences project. He attends the Cocoa Beach Junior/Senior High School, Cocoa Beach, Florida | JPL · 22777 |
| 22780 McAlpine | 1999 FS_{37} | Jayleen Jo McAlpine (born 1993) is a finalist in the 2006 Discovery Channel Young Scientist Challenge (DCYSC), a middle school science competition, for her biochemistry, medicine, health, and microbiology project. She attends the Sunburst Elementary School, Sunburst, Montana | JPL · 22780 |
| 22782 Kushalnaik | 1999 GJ_{19} | Kushal Ulhas Naik (born 1992) is a finalist in the 2006 Discovery Channel Young Scientist Challenge (DCYSC), a middle school science competition, for his biochemistry, medicine, health, and microbiology project. He attends the H.B. DuPont Middle School, Hockessin, Delaware | JPL · 22782 |
| 22783 Teng | 1999 GT_{52} | Stacy H. Teng (born 1980), a recent Ph.D. recipient at the University of Maryland, studies the evolution of nuclear activity in luminous and ultraluminous infrared galaxies and has confirmed the link between mergers and quasars. The name was suggested by M. M. Knight | JPL · 22783 |
| 22784 Theresaoei | 1999 JM_{43} | Theresa A. Oei (born 1993) is a finalist in the 2006 Discovery Channel Young Scientist Challenge (DCYSC), a middle school science competition, for her environmental sciences project. She attends the Oei Home School, Hebron, Connecticut | JPL · 22784 |
| 22786 Willipete | 1999 JY_{73} | William Garrett Pete (born 1995) is a finalist in the 2006 Discovery Channel Young Scientist Challenge (DCYSC), a middle school science competition, for his physical science project. He attends the Christina Huddleston Elementary School, Lakeville, Minnesota | JPL · 22786 |
| 22788 von Steuben | 1999 JA_{136} | Friedrich Wilhelm von Steuben (1730–1794), a Prussian military officer who taught standards of military drill and discipline to the Continental Army during the American Revolutionary War. Steuben Day parades (September) in New York and other American cities celebrate German culture | JPL · 22788 |
| 22791 Twarog | 1999 LL_{7} | Bruce Twarog (born 1952), a professor at the University of Kansas. | JPL · 22791 |
| 22794 Lindsayleona | 1999 NH_{4} | Lindsey Leona Precht (born 1993) is a finalist in the 2006 Discovery Channel Young Scientist Challenge (DCYSC), a middle school science competition, for her botany and zoology project. She attends the Miami Lakes Middle School, Miami, Florida | JPL · 22794 |

== 22801–22900 ==
back to top

| Named minor planet | Provisional | This minor planet was named for... | Ref; Catalog |
|---|---|---|---|
| 22802 Sigiriya | 1999 PK_{6} | Sigiriya is a fifth-century rock fortress in central Sri Lanka. It is a UNESCO World Heritage Site renowned for its frescoes. The name was suggested by N. H. Samarasinha | JPL · 22802 |
| 22809 Kensiequade | 1999 RL_{13} | Mackensie Kathryn Quade (born 1991) is a finalist in the 2006 Discovery Channel Young Scientist Challenge (DCYSC), a middle school science competition, for her biochemistry, medicine, health, and microbiology project. She attends the St. John the Baptist School, New Brighton, Minnesota | JPL · 22809 |
| 22810 Rawat | 1999 RQ_{14} | Radhika Rawat (born 1992) is a finalist in the 2006 Discovery Channel Young Scientist Challenge (DCYSC), a middle school science competition, for her physical science project. She attends the Summit Middle School, Boulder, Colorado | JPL · 22810 |
| 22812 Ricker | 1999 RY_{15} | Philip Daniel Ricker (born 1994) is a finalist in the 2006 Discovery Channel Young Scientist Challenge (DCYSC), a middle school science competition, for his biochemistry, medicine, health, and microbiology project. He attends the Ropesville Independent School District, Ropesville, Texas | JPL · 22812 |
| 22815 Sewell | 1999 RN_{18} | Michael T. Sewell (born 1993) is a finalist in the 2006 Discovery Channel Young Scientist Challenge (DCYSC), a middle school science competition, for his physical science project. He attends the Everest Academy, Clarkston, Michigan | JPL · 22815 |
| 22817 Shankar | 1999 RC_{23} | Aarthi Shankar (born 1992) is a finalist in the 2006 Discovery Channel Young Scientist Challenge (DCYSC), a middle school science competition, for her biochemistry, medicine, health, and microbiology project. She attends the Mountain Ridge Middle School, Colorado Springs, Colorado | JPL · 22817 |
| 22819 Davidtao | 1999 RY_{26} | David Tao (born 1992) is a finalist in the 2006 Discovery Channel Young Scientist Challenge (DCYSC), a middle school science competition, for his environmental sciences project. He attends the Takoma Park Middle School, Silver Spring, Maryland | JPL · 22819 |
| 22824 von Neumann | 1999 RP_{38} | John von Neumann (Neumann János), Hungarian-born American mathematician † | MPC · 22824 |
| 22827 Arvernia | 1999 RQ_{45} | Arvernia is the Latin name of the Auvergne, a region in south-central France. Much of the Auvergne region is covered by the Massif Central, an extinct volcanic mountain range. Name suggested by J. Meeus | JPL · 22827 |
| 22828 Jaynethomp | 1999 RF_{50} | Jayne B. Thompson (born 1991) is a finalist in the 2006 Discovery Channel Young Scientist Challenge (DCYSC), a middle school science competition, for her environmental sciences project. She attends the Pinedale Middle School, Pinedale, Wyoming | JPL · 22828 |
| 22829 Paigerin | 1999 RH_{52} | Paige Erin Thompson (born 1993) is a finalist in the 2006 Discovery Channel Young Scientist Challenge (DCYSC), a middle school science competition, for her environmental sciences project. She attends the Lincoln Middle School, Bradenton, Florida | JPL · 22829 |
| 22830 Tinker | 1999 RW_{52} | Joel Jack Tinker (born 1994) is a finalist in the 2006 Discovery Channel Young Scientist Challenge (DCYSC), a middle school science competition, for his engineering project. He attends the Covenant Christian Academy, Huntsville, Alabama | JPL · 22830 |
| 22831 Trevanvoorth | 1999 RF_{53} | Trevor Will van Voorthuijsen (born 1991) is a finalist in the 2006 Discovery Channel Young Scientist Challenge (DCYSC), a middle school science competition, for his behavioral science project. He attends the van Voorthuijsen Home School, Lecanto, Florida | JPL · 22831 |
| 22833 Scottyu | 1999 RR_{75} | Scott Sang Yu (born 1991) is a finalist in the 2006 Discovery Channel Young Scientist Challenge (DCYSC), a middle school science competition, for his behavioral science project. He attends the Robert Frost Middle School, Rockville, Maryland | JPL · 22833 |
| 22835 Rickgardner | 1999 RT_{88} | Rick Gardner mentored a finalist in the 2006 Discovery Channel Young Scientist Challenge (DCYSC), a middle school science competition. He teaches at the Three Oaks Middle School, Ft. Myers, Florida | JPL · 22835 |
| 22836 Leeannragasa | 1999 RH_{89} | LeeAnn Ragasa mentored a finalist in the 2006 Discovery Channel Young Scientist Challenge (DCYSC), a middle school science competition. She teaches at the Haaheo Elementary School, Hilo, Hawaii | JPL · 22836 |
| 22837 Richardcruz | 1999 RR_{90} | Richard Cruz mentored a finalist in the 2006 Discovery Channel Young Scientist Challenge (DCYSC), a middle school science competition. He teaches at the Bradley Middle School, San Antonio, Texas | JPL · 22837 |
| 22838 Darcyhampton | 1999 RF_{91} | Darcy Hampton mentored a finalist in the 2006 Discovery Channel Young Scientist Challenge (DCYSC), a middle school science competition. She teaches at the Alice Deal Junior High School, Washington, District of Columbia | JPL · 22838 |
| 22839 Richlawrence | 1999 RW_{92} | Richard Lawrence mentored a finalist in the 2006 Discovery Channel Young Scientist Challenge (DCYSC), a middle school science competition. He teaches at the Key Biscayne Elementary School, Miami, Florida | JPL · 22839 |
| 22840 Villarreal | 1999 RB_{98} | Margo Villarreal mentored a finalist in the 2006 Discovery Channel Young Scientist Challenge (DCYSC), a middle school science competition. She teaches at the Buckner Fanning Christian School, San Antonio, Texas | JPL · 22840 |
| 22842 Alenashort | 1999 RC_{107} | Alena Short mentored a finalist in the 2006 Discovery Channel Young Scientist Challenge (DCYSC), a middle school science competition. She teaches at the John Hancock Charter School, Pleasant Grove, Utah | JPL · 22842 |
| 22843 Stverak | 1999 RF_{107} | Janet Stverak mentored a finalist in the 2006 Discovery Channel Young Scientist Challenge (DCYSC), a middle school science competition. She teaches at the Trailwood Elementary School, Overland Park, Kansas | JPL · 22843 |
| 22846 Fredwhitaker | 1999 RN_{120} | Fred Joseph Whitaker mentored a finalist in the 2006 Discovery Channel Young Scientist Challenge (DCYSC), a middle school science competition. He teaches at the St. Francis of Assisi School, Louisville, Kentucky | JPL · 22846 |
| 22847 Utley | 1999 RO_{121} | Meredith Utley mentored a finalist in the 2006 Discovery Channel Young Scientist Challenge (DCYSC), a middle school science competition. She teaches at the Powhatan Junior High School, Powhatan, Virginia | JPL · 22847 |
| 22848 Chrisharriot | 1999 RJ_{125} | Christian Harriot mentored a finalist in the 2006 Discovery Channel Young Scientist Challenge (DCYSC), a middle school science competition. He taught at Robert Frost Middle School, Rockville, Maryland | JPL · 22848 |
| 22852 Kinney | 1999 RN_{129} | Steve Kinney mentored a finalist in the 2006 Discovery Channel Young Scientist Challenge (DCYSC), a middle school science competition. He teaches at the Woodcrest Christian School, Riverside, California | JPL · 22852 |
| 22855 Donnajones | 1999 RG_{139} | Donna Jones mentored a finalist in the 2006 Discovery Channel Young Scientist Challenge (DCYSC), a middle school science competition. She teaches at the Jones Home School, Tucson, Arizona | JPL · 22855 |
| 22856 Stevenzeiher | 1999 RX_{142} | Steven Zeiher mentored a finalist in the 2006 Discovery Channel Young Scientist Challenge (DCYSC), a middle school science competition. He teaches at the Waiakea Intermediate School, Hilo, Hawaii | JPL · 22856 |
| 22857 Hyde | 1999 RJ_{143} | Tammi Hyde mentored a finalist in the 2006 Discovery Channel Young Scientist Challenge (DCYSC), a middle school science competition. She teaches at the Seabrook Intermediate School, Seabrook, Texas | JPL · 22857 |
| 22858 Suesong | 1999 RV_{143} | Sue Song mentored a finalist in the 2006 Discovery Channel Young Scientist Challenge (DCYSC), a middle school science competition. She teaches at the Palos Verdes Intermediate School, Palos Verdes, California | JPL · 22858 |
| 22860 Francylemp | 1999 RA_{149} | Francy M. Lemp mentored a finalist in the 2006 Discovery Channel Young Scientist Challenge (DCYSC), a middle school science competition. She teaches at the Lemp Home School, Waterford, Michigan | JPL · 22860 |
| 22862 Janinedavis | 1999 RG_{152} | Janine Davis mentored a finalist in the 2006 Discovery Channel Young Scientist Challenge (DCYSC), a middle school science competition. She teaches at the Bonaire Middle School, Bonaire, Georgia | JPL · 22862 |
| 22863 Namarkarian | 1999 RJ_{152} | Nanor Markarian mentored a finalist in the 2006 Discovery Channel Young Scientist Challenge (DCYSC), a middle school science competition. She teaches at the A.G.B.U. Manoogian Demirdjan School, Canoga Par, California | JPL · 22863 |
| 22865 Amymoffett | 1999 RQ_{173} | Amy Moffett mentored a finalist in the 2006 Discovery Channel Young Scientist Challenge (DCYSC), a middle school science competition. She teaches at the Cocoa Beach Junior/Senior High School, Cocoa Beach, Florida | JPL · 22865 |
| 22868 Karst | 1999 RX_{187} | Carol A. Karst mentored a finalist in the 2006 Discovery Channel Young Scientist Challenge (DCYSC), a middle school science competition. She teaches at the Sunburst Elementary School, Sunburst, Montana | JPL · 22868 |
| 22869 Brianmcfar | 1999 RP_{190} | Brian McFarland mentored a finalist in the 2006 Discovery Channel Young Scientist Challenge (DCYSC), a middle school science competition. He teaches at the H.B. DuPont Middle School, Hockessin, Delaware | JPL · 22869 |
| 22870 Rosing | 1999 RO_{193} | Wayne Rosing (born 1946) is an electrical engineer and computer industry executive. JPL | MPC · 22870 |
| 22871 Ellenoei | 1999 RX_{193} | Ellen C. Oei mentored a finalist in the 2006 Discovery Channel Young Scientist Challenge (DCYSC), a middle school science competition. She teaches at the Oei Home School, Hebron, Connecticut | JPL · 22871 |
| 22872 Williamweber | 1999 RM_{194} | William James Weber mentored a finalist in the 2006 Discovery Channel Young Scientist Challenge (DCYSC), a middle school science competition. He teaches at the Christina Huddleston Elementary School, Lakeville, Minnesota | JPL · 22872 |
| 22873 Heatherholt | 1999 RR_{194} | Heather Holt mentored a finalist in the 2006 Discovery Channel Young Scientist Challenge (DCYSC), a middle school science competition. She teaches at the Miami Lakes Middle School, Miami, Florida | JPL · 22873 |
| 22874 Haydeephelps | 1999 RO_{197} | Haydee Phelps mentored a finalist in the 2006 Discovery Channel Young Scientist Challenge (DCYSC), a middle school science competition. She teaches at the Summit Middle School, Boulder, Colorado | JPL · 22874 |
| 22875 Lanejackson | 1999 RB_{198} | Lane L. Jackson mentored a finalist in the 2006 Discovery Channel Young Scientist Challenge (DCYSC), a middle school science competition. She teaches at the Ropesville Independent School District, Ropesville, Texas | JPL · 22875 |
| 22877 Reginamiller | 1999 RR_{200} | Regina Miller mentored a finalist in the 2006 Discovery Channel Young Scientist Challenge (DCYSC), a middle school science competition. She teaches at the Mountain Ridge Middle School, Colorado Springs, Colorado | JPL · 22877 |
| 22880 Pulaski | 1999 RL_{224} | A Polish soldier, Kazimierz Michal Waclaw Wiktor Pulaski (1745–1779), is often called "the father of American cavalry" in reference to training he provided to the Continental Army during the American Revolution. In Illinois, an eponymous holiday is traditionally held on the first Monday in March to celebrate Polish culture | JPL · 22880 |
| 22885 Sakaemura | 1999 RS_{239} | Sakaemura is a small mountainside village in Nagano prefecture, Japan. | JPL · 22885 |
| 22889 Donnablaney | 1999 SU_{7} | Donna Blaney mentored a finalist in the 2006 Discovery Channel Young Scientist Challenge (DCYSC), a middle school science competition. She teaches at the Takoma Park Middle School, Silver Spring, Maryland | JPL · 22889 |
| 22890 Ruthaellis | 1999 SF_{8} | Rutha Ellis mentored a finalist in the 2006 Discovery Channel Young Scientist Challenge (DCYSC), a middle school science competition. She teaches at the Lincoln Middle School, Bradenton, Florida | JPL · 22890 |
| 22898 Falce | 1999 TF_{12} | Falce, Italian for "Scythe", nickname of Renato Conedera, the discoverer's father-in-law. | JPL · 22898 |
| 22899 Alconrad | 1999 TO_{14} | Albert R. Conrad (born 1953) has been a dedicated adaptive-optics (AO) scientist at several U.S. observatories. Using AO, he has co-discovered many satellites of asteroids and made disk-resolved studies of asteroids and planetary satellites for size/shape/pole and topography. He has developed many innovative AO techniques. | JPL · 22899 |
| 22900 Trudie | 1999 TW_{14} | Trudie R. Wilson (1913–2001), mother of the discoverer. | JPL · 22900 |

== 22901–23000 ==
back to top

| Named minor planet | Provisional | This minor planet was named for... | Ref; Catalog |
|---|---|---|---|
| 22901 Ivanbella | 1999 TY_{15} | Ivan Bella (born 1964 ), a Slovak cosmonaut | JPL · 22901 |
| 22903 Georgeclooney | 1999 TU_{18} | George Clooney (born 1961), an American actor | JPL · 22903 |
| 22905 Liciniotoso | 1999 TO_{19} | Licinio Toso (1920–1999), grandfather of Italian astronomer Alberto Toso, member of the discovering team at Farra d'Isonzo Observatory | MPC · 22905 |
| 22906 Lisauckis | 1999 TQ_{25} | Rhonda Lisauckis mentored a finalist in the 2006 Discovery Channel Young Scientist Challenge (DCYSC), a middle school science competition. She teaches at the Covenant Christian Academy, Huntsville, Alabama | JPL · 22906 |
| 22907 van Voorthuijsen | 1999 TL_{26} | Lorrie van Voorthuijsen mentored a finalist in the 2006 Discovery Channel Young Scientist Challenge (DCYSC), a middle school science competition. She teaches at the van Voorthuijsen Home School, Lecanto, Florida | JPL · 22907 |
| 22908 Bayefsky-Anand | 1999 TK_{27} | Sarah Dana Bayefsky-Anand, American finalist in the 2007 Intel Science Talent Search (ISTS) | JPL · 22908 |
| 22909 Gongmyunglee | 1999 TJ_{28} | Gongmyung Lee, American finalist in the 2007 Intel Science Talent Search (ISTS) | JPL · 22909 |
| 22910 Ruiwang | 1999 TM_{30} | Rui Wang, American finalist in the 2007 Intel Science Talent Search (ISTS) | JPL · 22910 |
| 22911 Johnpardon | 1999 TX_{30} | John Vincent Pardon, American finalist in the 2007 Intel Science Talent Search (ISTS) | JPL · 22911 |
| 22912 Noraxu | 1999 TF_{31} | Nora Xu, American finalist in the 2007 Intel Science Talent Search (ISTS) | JPL · 22912 |
| 22913 Brockman | 1999 TO_{32} | Gregory Drew Brockman, American finalist in the 2007 Intel Science Talent Search (ISTS) | JPL · 22913 |
| 22914 Tsunanmachi | 1999 TU_{36} | Tsunanmachi, a town in Niigata prefecture, Japan. | JPL · 22914 |
| 22919 Shuwan | 1999 TR_{91} | Shu Wan, American finalist in the 2007 Intel Science Talent Search (ISTS) | JPL · 22919 |
| 22920 Kaitduncan | 1999 TF_{94} | Kaitlin Duncan, American finalist in the 2007 Intel Science Talent Search (ISTS) | JPL · 22920 |
| 22921 Siyuanliu | 1999 TG_{95} | Siyuan Liu, American finalist in the 2007 Intel Science Talent Search (ISTS) | JPL · 22921 |
| 22922 Sophiecai | 1999 TF_{97} | Sophie Cai, American finalist in the 2007 Intel Science Talent Search (ISTS) | JPL · 22922 |
| 22923 Kathrynblair | 1999 TM_{97} | Kathryn Blair Friedman, American finalist in the 2007 Intel Science Talent Search (ISTS) | JPL · 22923 |
| 22924 Deshpande | 1999 TH_{101} | Neha Anil Deshpande, American finalist in the 2007 Intel Science Talent Search (ISTS) | JPL · 22924 |
| 22927 Blewett | 1999 TW_{110} | Megan Marie Blewett, American finalist in the 2007 Intel Science Talent Search (ISTS) | JPL · 22927 |
| 22928 Templehe | 1999 TS_{111} | Temple Mu He, American finalist in the 2007 Intel Science Talent Search (ISTS) | JPL · 22928 |
| 22929 Seanwahl | 1999 TL_{126} | Sean Matthew Wahl, American finalist in the 2007 Intel Science Talent Search (ISTS) | JPL · 22929 |
| 22932 Orenbrecher | 1999 TU_{136} | Oren Brecher, American finalist in the 2007 Intel Science Talent Search (ISTS) | JPL · 22932 |
| 22933 Mareverett | 1999 TZ_{141} | Marshall Bradley Everett, American finalist in the 2007 Intel Science Talent Search (ISTS) | JPL · 22933 |
| 22936 Ricmccutchen | 1999 TR_{172} | Richard Matthew McCutchen, American finalist in the 2007 Intel Science Talent Search (ISTS) | JPL · 22936 |
| 22937 Nataliavella | 1999 TZ_{172} | Natalie Avella Cameron, American finalist in the 2007 Intel Science Talent Search (ISTS) | JPL · 22937 |
| 22938 Brilawrence | 1999 TS_{173} | Brian Robert Lawrence, American finalist in the 2007 Intel Science Talent Search (ISTS) | JPL · 22938 |
| 22939 Handlin | 1999 TU_{173} | Daniel Adam Handlin, American finalist in the 2007 Intel Science Talent Search (ISTS) | JPL · 22939 |
| 22940 Chyan | 1999 TF_{178} | Yieu Chyan, American finalist in the 2007 Intel Science Talent Search (ISTS) | JPL · 22940 |
| 22942 Alexacourtis | 1999 TZ_{205} | Alexandra Maria Courtis, American finalist in the 2007 Intel Science Talent Search (ISTS) | JPL · 22942 |
| 22944 Sarahmarzen | 1999 TB_{216} | Sarah Elizabeth Marzen, American finalist in the 2007 Intel Science Talent Search (ISTS) | JPL · 22944 |
| 22945 Schikowski | 1999 TY_{216} | Erin Marie Schikowski, American finalist in the 2007 Intel Science Talent Search (ISTS) | JPL · 22945 |
| 22947 Carolsuh | 1999 TW_{218} | Carol Yoon Joo Suh, American finalist in the 2007 Intel Science Talent Search (ISTS) | JPL · 22947 |
| 22948 Maidanak | 1999 TR_{222} | Maidanak, a mountainous region in southeast Uzbekistan. | JPL · 22948 |
| 22951 Okabekazuko | 1999 TA_{243} | Kazuko Okabe (born 1972), of the Japan Aerospace Exploration Agency, is the secretary of Junichiro Kawaguchi, project manager for the Hayabusa mission. | JPL · 22951 |
| 22952 Hommasachi | 1999 TF_{243} | Sachiko Homma (born 1965), of the Japan Aerospace Exploration Agency, is the secretary of Makoto Yoshikawa, project scientist for the Hayabusa mission | JPL · 22952 |
| 22955 Tibees | 1999 TH_{251} | Toby Hendy (born 1995), New Zealand science communicator. | JPL · 22955 |
| 22957 Vaintrob | 1999 TR_{270} | Dmitry Vaintrob, American finalist in the 2007 Intel Science Talent Search (ISTS) | JPL · 22957 |
| 22958 Rohatgi | 1999 TC_{288} | Abhinav Rohatgi, American finalist in the 2007 Intel Science Talent Search (ISTS) | JPL · 22958 |
| 22961 Rosegarcia | 1999 UM_{14} | Rose Garcia (b.1974), American engineer, observer for the Catalina Sky Survey who discovered 2 asteroids | IAU · 22961 |
| 22963 Fuls | 1999 UN_{24} | David Carson Fuls (b. 1986), American astronomer and engineer with the Catalina Sky Survey. He has discovered several near-Earth asteroids. | IAU · 22963 |
| 22978 Nyrola | 1999 VO_{24} | Nyrölä is a small rural village in central Finland and the site of the countryside observatory of the astronomical association Jyväskylän Sirius ry at Nyrölä Observatory | JPL · 22978 |
| 22981 Katz | 1999 VN_{30} | Daniel Scott Katz, American finalist in the 2007 Intel Science Talent Search (ISTS) | JPL · 22981 |
| 22982 Emmacall | 1999 VB_{31} | Emma Call, American finalist in the 2007 Intel Science Talent Search (ISTS) | JPL · 22982 |
| 22983 Schlingheyde | 1999 VY_{34} | Catherine Schlingheyde, American finalist in the 2007 Intel Science Talent Search (ISTS) | JPL · 22983 |
| 22987 Rebeckaufman | 1999 VO_{53} | Rebecca Lynn Kaufman, American finalist in the 2007 Intel Science Talent Search (ISTS) | JPL · 22987 |
| 22988 Jimmyhom | 1999 VN_{58} | Jimmy Hom, American finalist in the 2007 Intel Science Talent Search (ISTS) | JPL · 22988 |
| 22989 Loriskopp | 1999 VY_{61} | Lori Skopp, American mentor of a 2007 Intel Science Talent Search (ISTS) finalist | JPL · 22989 |
| 22990 Mattbrenner | 1999 VA_{62} | Matthew Brenner, American mentor of a 2007 Intel Science Talent Search (ISTS) finalist | JPL · 22990 |
| 22991 Jeffreyklus | 1999 VX_{62} | Jeffrey Klus, American mentor of a 2007 Intel Science Talent Search (ISTS) finalist | JPL · 22991 |
| 22992 Susansmith | 1999 VR_{65} | Susan Smith, American mentor of a 2007 Intel Science Talent Search (ISTS) finalist | JPL · 22992 |
| 22993 Aferrari | 1999 VX_{65} | Andrew Ferrari, American mentor of a 2007 Intel Science Talent Search (ISTS) finalist | JPL · 22993 |
| 22994 Workman | 1999 VH_{66} | David Workman, American mentor of a 2007 Intel Science Talent Search (ISTS) finalist | JPL · 22994 |
| 22995 Allenjanes | 1999 VM_{67} | Allen Janes, American mentor of a 2007 Intel Science Talent Search (ISTS) finalist | JPL · 22995 |
| 22996 De Boo | 1999 VP_{70} | Edward de Boo, American mentor of a 2007 Intel Science Talent Search (ISTS) finalist | JPL · 22996 |
| 22998 Waltimyer | 1999 VY_{70} | David Waltimyer, American mentor of a 2007 Intel Science Talent Search (ISTS) finalist | JPL · 22998 |
| 22999 Irizarry | 1999 VS_{81} | Carmen Irizarry, American mentor of a 2007 Intel Science Talent Search (ISTS) finalist | JPL · 22999 |

back to top

| Preceded by 21,001–22,000 | Meanings of minor-planet names List of minor planets: 22,001–23,000 | Succeeded by 23,001–24,000 |
