= Andel =

Andel or Anděl may refer to:

- Andel, Netherlands, a village in the municipality of Altena
- Angel Award (Czech music) (Czech: cena Anděl)
- Anděl (neighborhood), a part of the Czech capital Prague
- Anděl (Prague Metro), a metro station in the Anděl neighborhood of Prague
- Andel, Côtes-d'Armor, a commune in France
- Anděl (crater), a lunar crater
- Andel, one of the main antagonists of the Arc the Lad (series) video game series
- Andel (company), a Danish energy and telecoms company formerly known as SEAS-NVE
- Anděl (surname), a Czech surname

== See also ==
- Van Andel
