= Anděl (surname) =

Anděl (feminine: Andělová) is a Czech surname. Andel (feminine: Andelová) is a Slovak surname. They literally translate as 'angel'. Notable people with the surname include:

- Karel Anděl (1884–1947), Czech astronomer and selenographer
- Marián Andel (born 1950), Slovak politician
- Laura Andel (born 1968), Argentinian musician, conductor and composer
- Pavel Anděl (born 1964), Czech actor, musician, writer and television presenter

== See also ==
- Van Andel
