= Almanon (crater) =

Lunar crater of caliph Al-Ma'mun

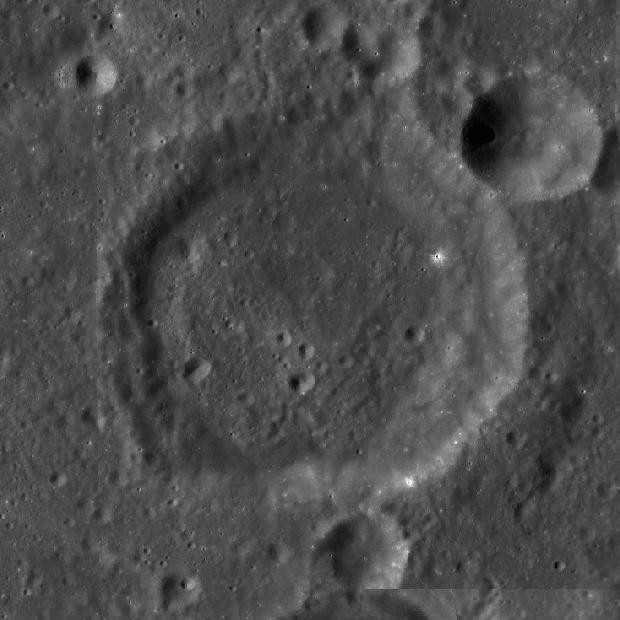
- LRO WAC mosaic
- Coordinates: 16.8°S 15.2°E
- Diameter: 47.76 km
- Depth: 2.5 km
- Colongitude: 345° at sunrise
- Eponym: Abdalla Al Mamun

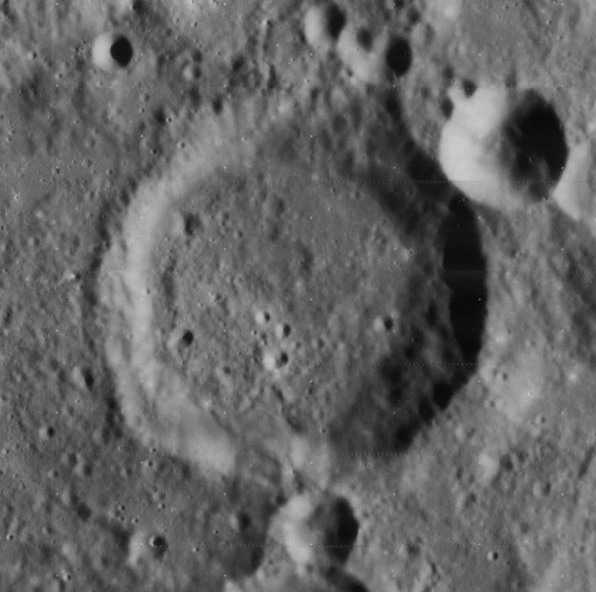
Lunar Orbiter 4 image

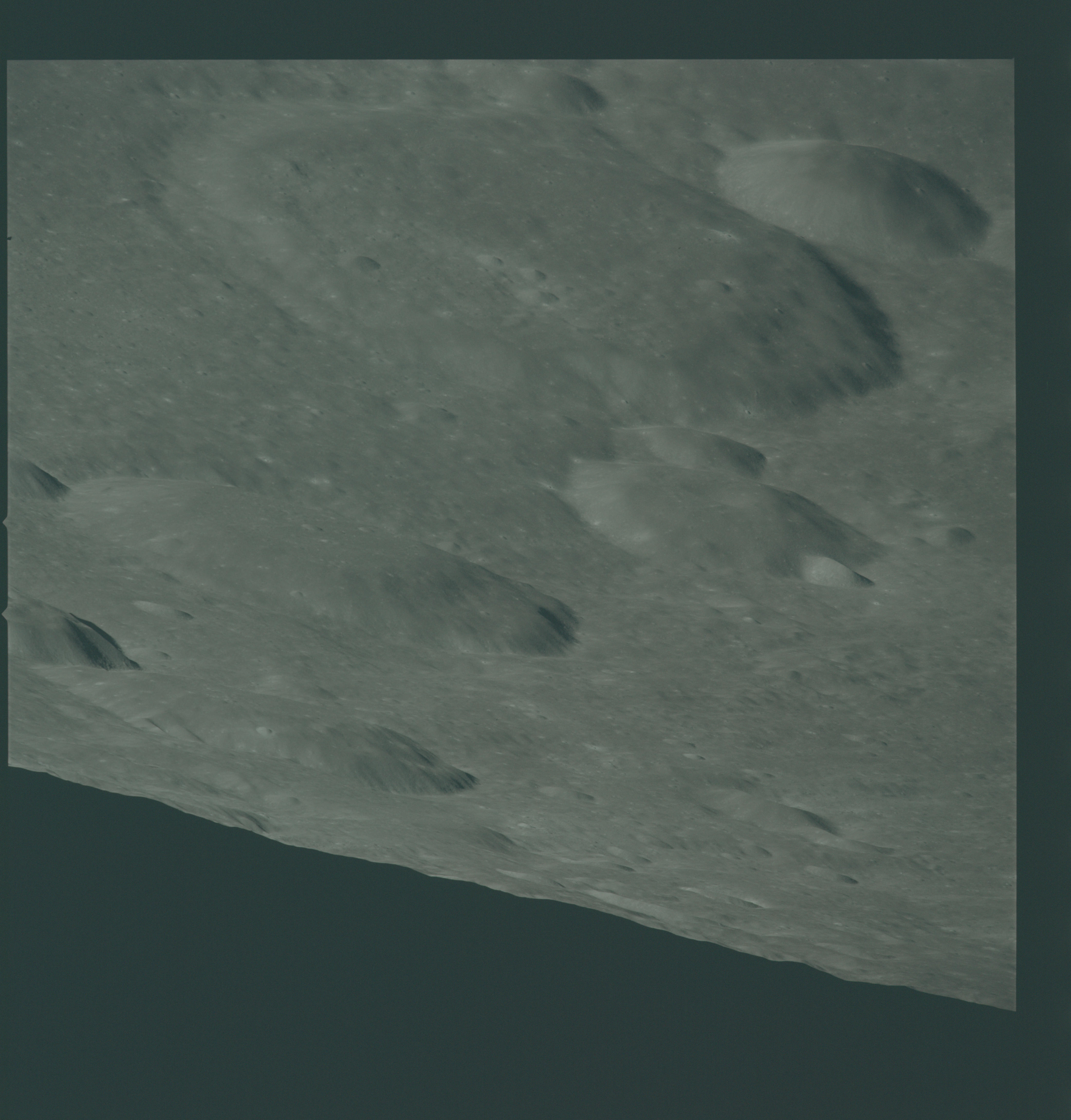
Oblique view of Almanon, the satellite crater Almanon C and its surroundings including Geber and Azophi, Apollo 16 image

Almanon is a lunar impact crater that lies in the rugged highlands in the south-central region of the Moon. It is located to the south-southeast of Abulfeda, and to the north-northeast of the smaller crater Geber. The crater chain designated Catena Abulfeda forms a line between the south rim of Abulfeda and the north rim of Almanon, continuing for a length of about 210 kilometers to the Rupes Altai scarp.

The rim of Almanon forms a slightly distorted circle, with outward bulges to the north and southwest. The crater pair Almanon A and Almanon B is attached to the exterior of the southern rim. The interior wall is wider along the eastern side than elsewhere. Small craters belonging to the Catena Abulfeda intrude slightly into the northeast rim. The outer wall is generally worn and lacks the crispness of a younger crater, but is not significantly impacted by subsequent cratering. The interior floor is relatively flat and lacks notable features other than a few tiny craterlets.

This crater was named after Abbasid Caliph and patron of astronomers Al-Ma'mun. Its designation was formally adopted by the International Astronomical Union in 1935. The name was introduced into lunar nomenclature as Almaeon by Italian astronomer G. B. Ricciolli in 1651.

== Satellite craters ==
By convention these features are identified on lunar maps by placing the letter on the side of the crater midpoint that is closest to Almanon.

Almanon	Latitude	Longitude	Diameter
A	17.7° S	15.3° E	10 km
B	18.3° S	15.3° E	25 km
C	16.1° S	16.0° E	16 km
D	18.6° S	15.6° E	6 km
E	17.9° S	13.7° E	5 km
F	15.9° S	14.3° E	5 km
G	17.8° S	14.6° E	5 km
H	19.0° S	15.3° E	6 km
K	15.8° S	15.4° E	8 km
L	18.9° S	16.6° E	6 km
P	18.5° S	17.0° E	8 km
Q	18.1° S	17.0° E	5 km
R	18.2° S	15.9° E	4 km
