= Anděl (crater) =

Crater on the Moon

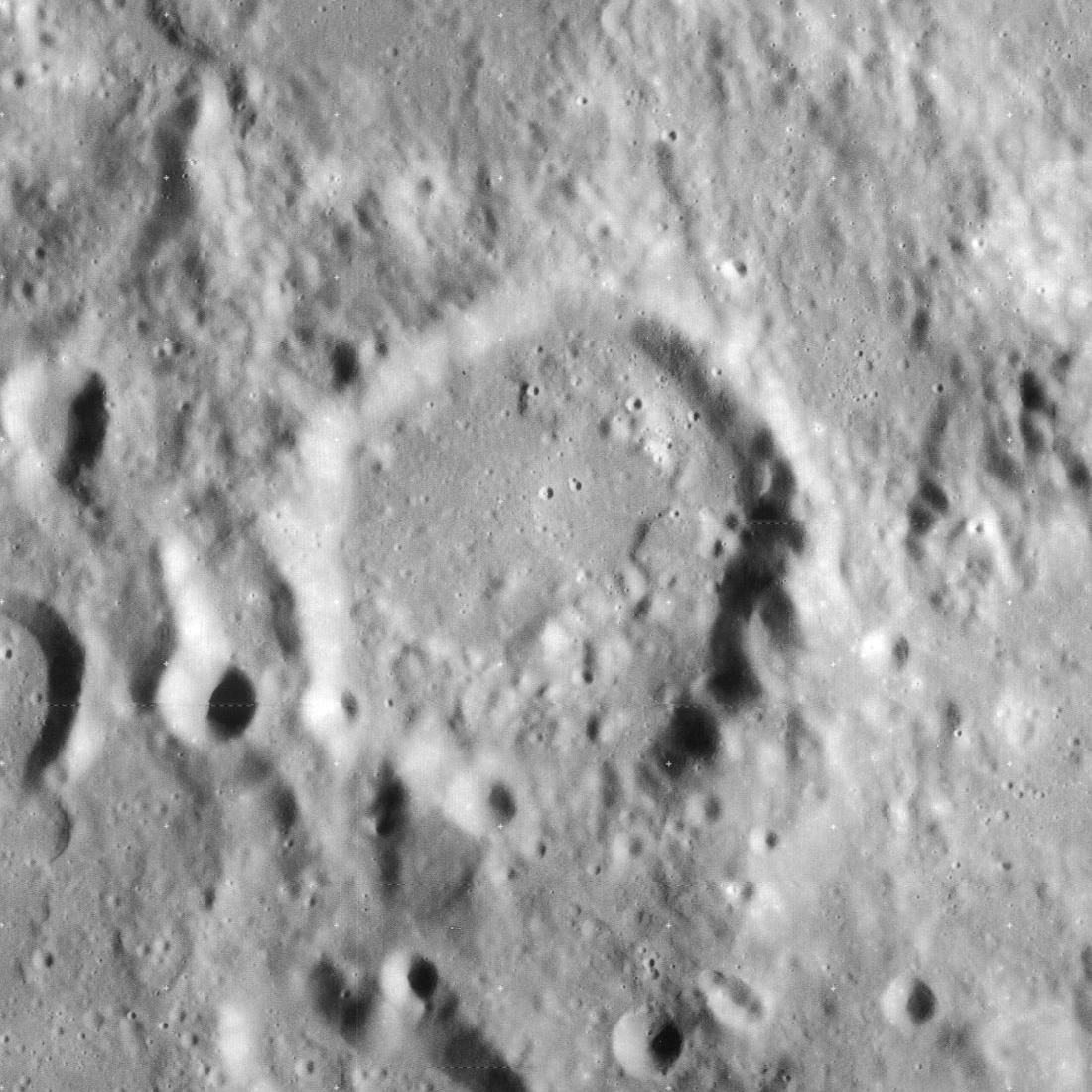
- Lunar Orbiter 4 image
- Coordinates: 10.4°S 12.4°E
- Diameter: 32.93 km
- Depth: 1.35 km
- Colongitude: 348° at sunrise
- Eponym: Karel Anděl

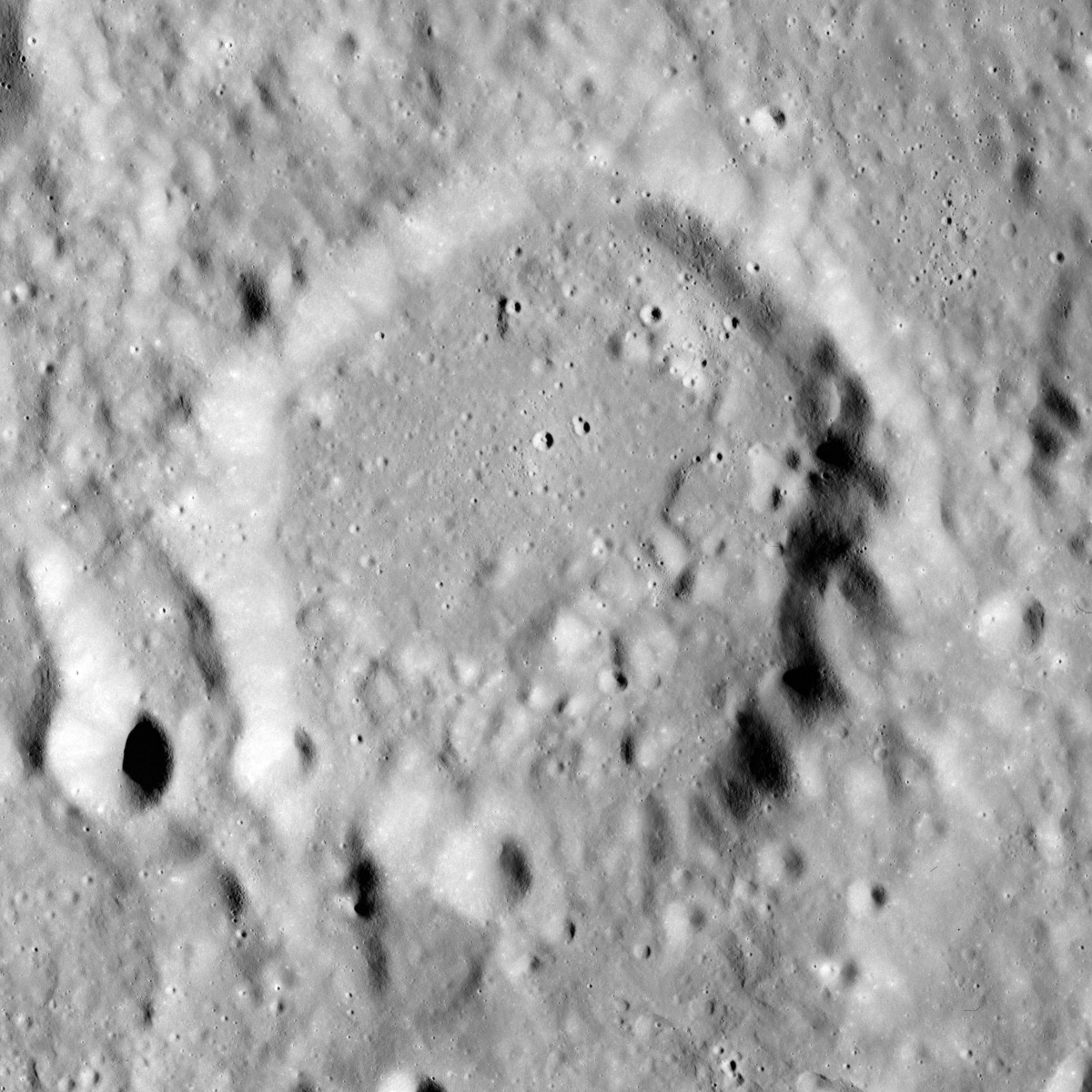
Apollo 16 image

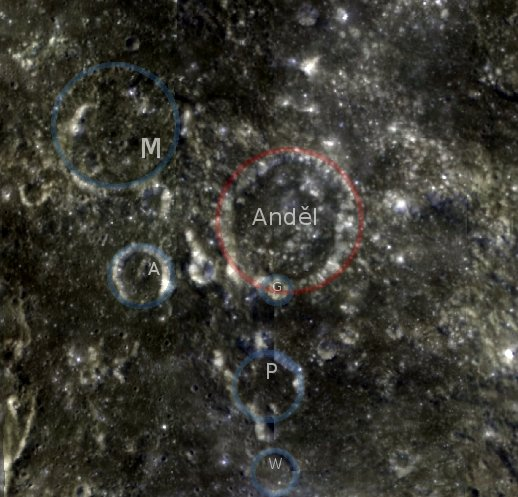
Anděl and several satellite craters (Clementine image)

Anděl is a lunar impact crater that lies in the rugged central highlands of the Moon. Nearby craters of note include Abulfeda to the south-southeast and Descartes to the east-southeast. About 85 kilometres to the east-northeast of the outer rim is the landing site of the Apollo 16 mission.

The eroded outer rim of Anděl has been worn and distorted into a polygonal shape, and is nearly non-existent to the south where Anděl G intersects the perimeter. The interior floor is nearly flat, with some irregularities to the southeast. There is a tiny craterlet located just to the southeast of the midpoint, but no central peak of any significance.

This crater is named after the Czech astronomer Karel Anděl (1884-1948). Its designation was formally adopted by the International Astronomical Union in 1935. The name was introduced into lunar nomenclature by amateur astronomer Karl Müller.

== Satellite craters ==
By convention these features are identified on lunar maps by placing the letter on the side of the crater midpoint that is closest to Anděl.

Anděl	Latitude	Longitude	Diameter
A	10.8° S	11.3° E	14 km
C	9.0° S	11.2° E	3 km
D	10.8° S	11.7° E	6 km
E	12.0° S	12.2° E	6 km
F	8.3° S	11.1° E	9 km
G	11.0° S	12.4° E	4 km
H	6.7° S	11.3° E	6 km
J	7.5° S	11.4° E	6 km
K	5.8° S	11.6° E	4 km
M	9.7° S	11.1° E	27 km
N	10.2° S	11.4° E	8 km
P	11.6° S	12.3° E	19 km
S	11.4° S	12.7° E	4 km
T	11.2° S	13.3° E	4 km
W	12.4° S	12.3° E	12 km
