= Descartes (crater) =

Crater on the Moon

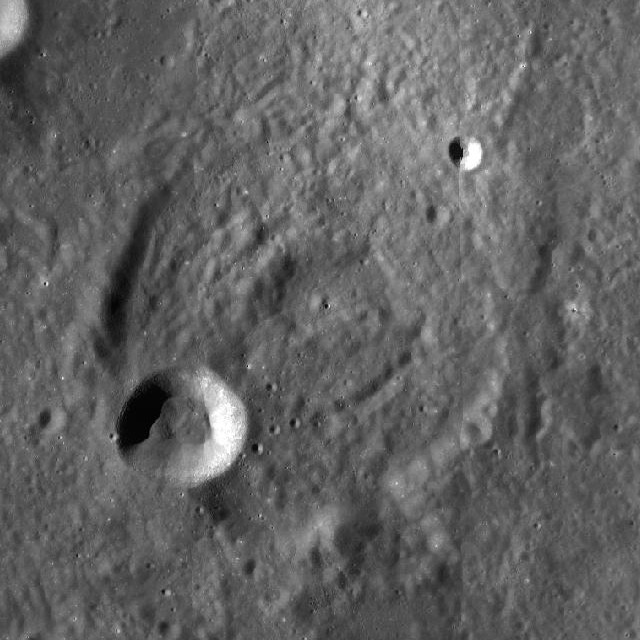
- LRO WAC mosaic
- Coordinates: 11.7°S 15.7°E
- Diameter: 47.73 km (29.66 mi)
- Depth: 0.85 km (0.53 mi)
- Colongitude: 344° at sunrise
- Eponym: René Descartes

Descartes is a heavily worn lunar impact crater that is located in the rugged south-central highlands of the Moon. To the southwest is the crater Abulfeda. Further to the west-northwest is Anděl crater, while Kant is located to the east=northeast.

The rim of Descartes survives only in stretches, and is completely missing in the north. The crater Descartes A lies across the southwest rim. The interior floor contains several curved ridges. These are concentric with the surviving outer walls to the northwest and southeast, forming the remains of an inner ring.

A section of the outer rim of Descartes is covered by a region that has a higher albedo than the surrounding surface. Low-altitude measurements by the Lunar Prospector showed that this patch is actually a magnetic anomaly—the strongest on the near side of the Moon. This magnetic field may be deflecting particles from the solar wind, and thus preventing the underlying surface from growing darker because of space weathering. This is similar to the process causing Reiner Gamma and other bright swirls such as those of Mare Marginis and Mare Ingenii.

About 50 kilometers to the north of this crater was the landing site of Apollo 16. The uneven region about the landing area is sometimes called the Descartes Highlands or the Descartes Mountains.

This formation is named after the French philosopher, mathematician and physicist René Descartes. His name was introduced with the lunar nomenclature of Johann H. von Mädler. Its designation was formally adopted by the International Astronomical Union in 1935.

== Satellite craters ==
By convention these features are identified on lunar maps by placing the letter on the side of the crater midpoint that is closest to Descartes.

Descartes	Latitude	Longitude	Diameter
A	12.1° S	15.2° E	16 km
C	11.0° S	16.3° E	4 km

== Descartes C and Dollond E during full moon ==
Immediately northeast of Descartes, the two bowl-shaped high albedo craters Descartes C and Dollond E seem to be connected by a bright looking oblong patch. This bright patch was called Caramuelis by the Flemish-Dutch selenographer Michael van Langren. North of van Langren's Caramuelis, Apollo 16's lunar module Orion landed between the small high albedo craterlets North Ray Crater and South Ray Crater. The couple of high albedo bowl-shaped craters Kant P and Kant Z, east of van Langren's Caramuelis, are sometimes erroneously seen as Apollo 16's North Ray Crater and South Ray Crater. Michael van Langren's bright Caramuelis and the high albedo bowl-shaped craters in the neighbourhood are also noticeable on the photographic version of chart LAC 78 (page 156) in The Clementine Atlas of the Moon (Ben Bussey / Paul D. Spudis).

== Gallery ==
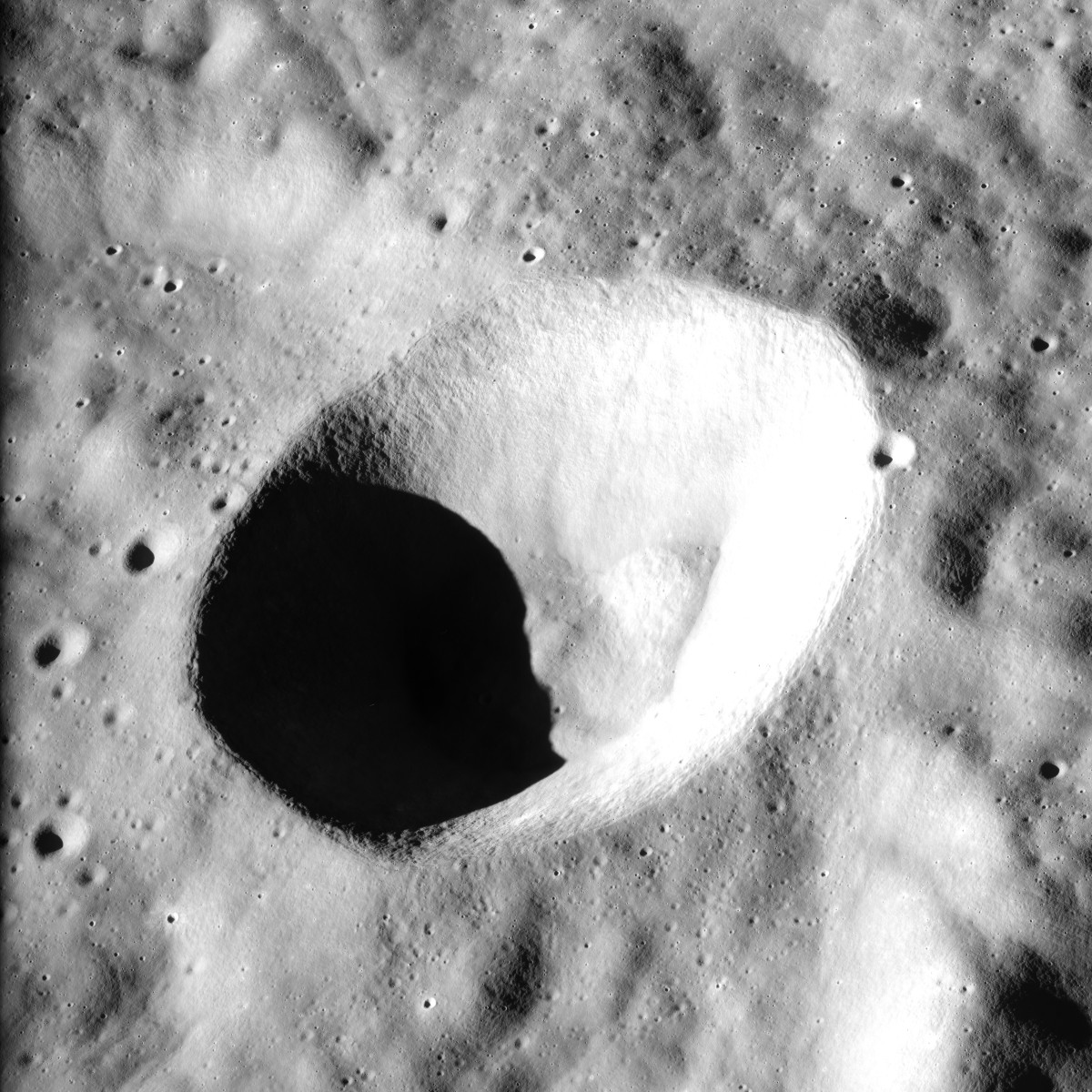
Descartes A crater

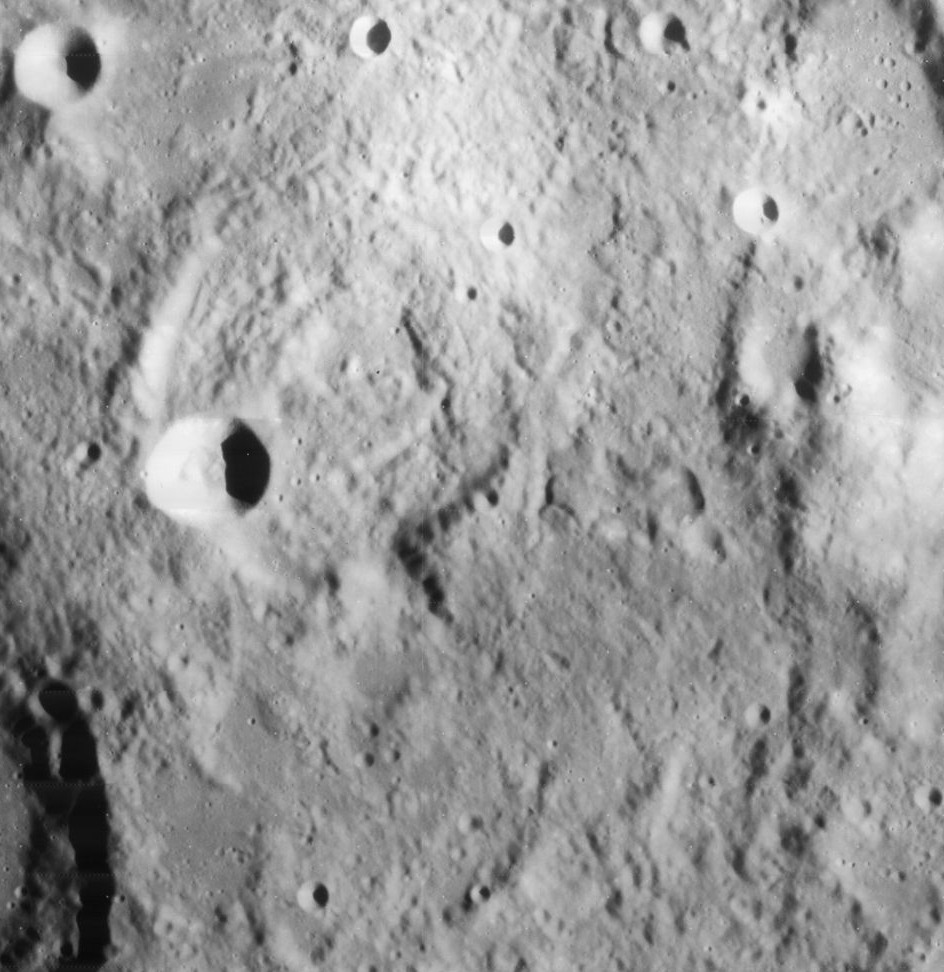
Descartes crater is at upper left. The bright patch northeast of Descartes is a magnetic anomaly.

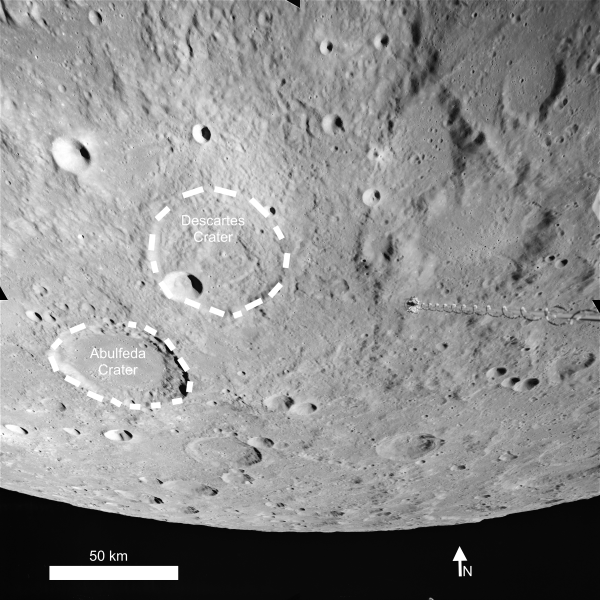
Abulfeda and Descartes craters
NASA Image

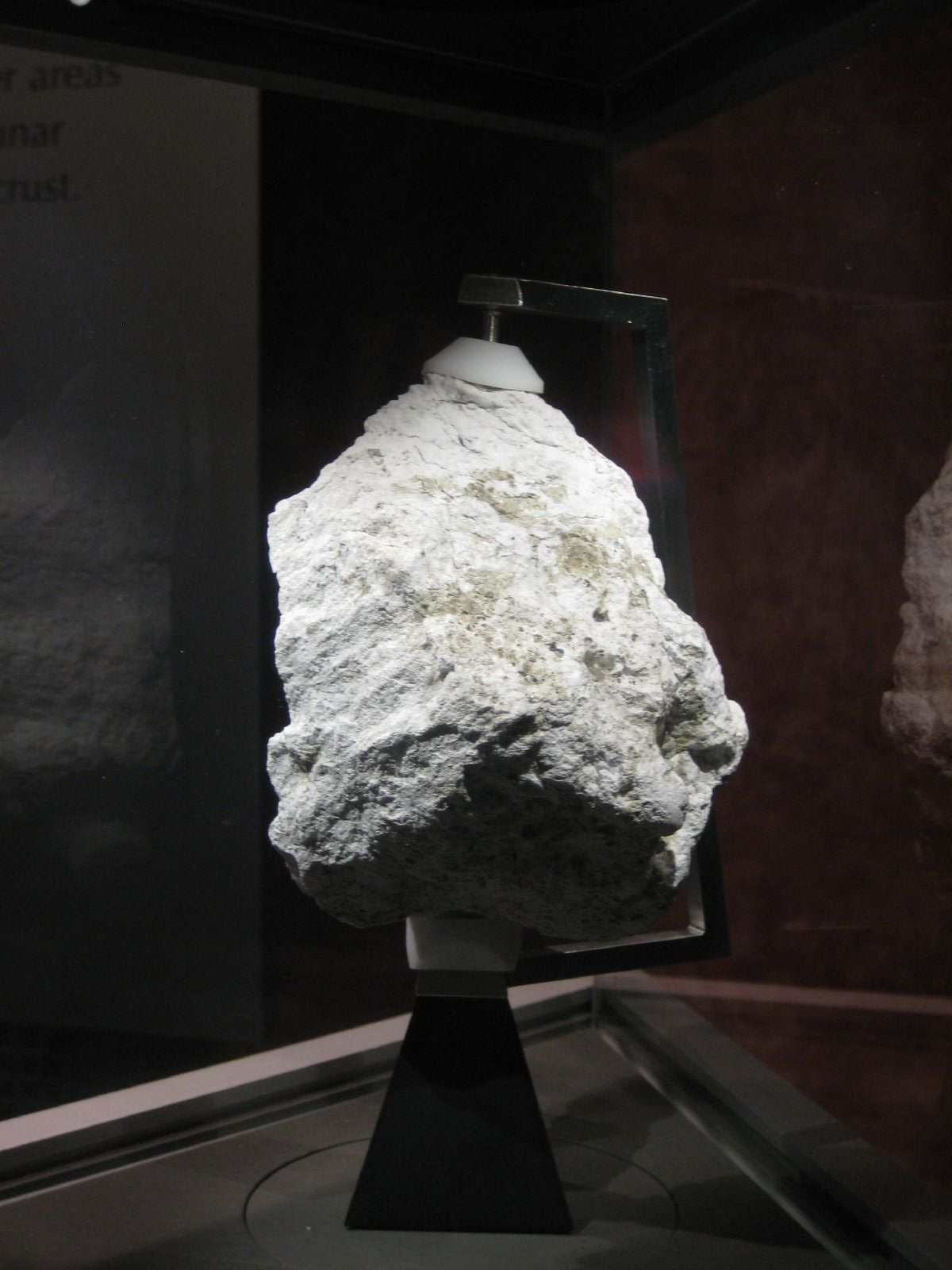
Lunar Ferroan Anorthosite rock collected from the Lunar Highlands near Descartes.
