= Catena Abulfeda =

Chain of craters on the Moon

Coordinates: 16.9°S 17.2°E

Catena Abulfeda is a chain of craters on the Moon that runs between the southern rim of the crater Abulfeda and the north rim of Almanon, then continues for a length of 210 kilometers across the Rupes Altai. This crater chain is the best known feature of its type on the Moon. It consists of a linear string of 20 impact craters ranging in size from 1 to 3 km in diameter. The largest, Almanon C, is positioned near the middle of the chain.

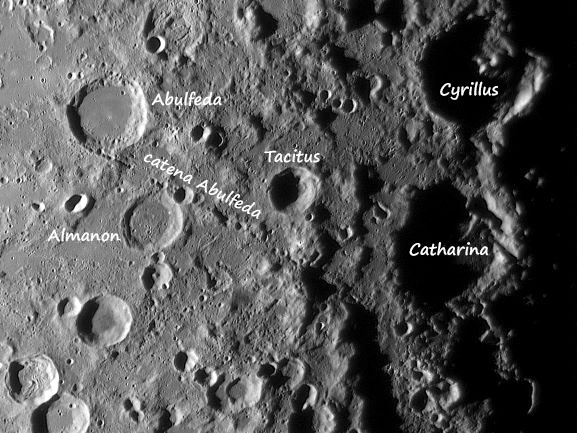
catena Abulfeda
