= Pek van Andel =

Dutch physician and researcher

Menko Victor (Pek) van Andel (born 1944), known as a "serendipitologist", obtained his university degree in medical research in Groningen. There, he developed an artificial cornea as a treatment for blindness alongside the inventive ophthalmologist Jan Worst. This low-cost prosthesis was honored with the Wubbo Ockels innovation prize in 1994 and remains widely manufactured and implanted in India.

In 2000, Van Andel won the satirical Ig Nobel Prize for medicine for iconoclastic MRI scans of human sexual intercourse, a study titled "Love between the magnets". Published in the British Medical Journal and inspired by scans of the larynx of a singing individual, the research captured internal images of male and female anatomy working together.

== Serendipitology and "Anatomy of the Unsought Finding" ==
Van Andel systematically studied accidental knowledge discovery, publishing his landmark 1994 paper "Anatomy of the Unsought Finding" in the British Journal for the Philosophy of Science. He defined serendipity as "the art of making an unsought finding," arguing it involves an abrupt cognitive transition via abduction. Tracing the term to Horace Walpole's reference to The Three Princes of Serendip, he highlighted the classic tale of deducing an unseen camel via roadside clues. He noted that while serendipity cannot be strictly programmed, researchers can learn patterns to recognize structural anomalies, a topic he later revisited in a 2015 TEDx talk.

== Digital Serendipity and FERASAT ==
Van Andel later applied these concepts to digital environments in collaboration with computer scientist Ali Khalili and researchers from Vrije Universiteit Amsterdam. Their 2017 study presented at the ACM Knowledge Capture Conference introduced an adaptive multigraph-based faceted browser. This led to the creation of FERASAT (*FacEted bRowser And Serendipity cATalyzer*), a Semantic Web application designed to intentionally introduce cognitive triggers and data anomalies to foster accidental breakthroughs.
