= The Nonexistent Knight =

1959 fantasy novel by Italo Calvino

- First italian edition cover
- Author: Italo Calvino
- Original title: Il cavaliere inesistente
- Cover artist: Paolo Uccello, The Battle of San Romano
- Language: Italian
- Publication date: 1959
- English publication date: 1962

The Nonexistent Knight (Italian: Il cavaliere inesistente) is an allegorical fantasy novel by Italian writer Italo Calvino, first published in Italian in 1959 and in English translation in 1962. The tale explores questions of identity, integration with society, and virtue through the adventures of Agilulf, a medieval knight who exemplifies chivalry, piety, and faithfulness but exists only as an empty suit of armour.

== Plot ==
The protagonists of this novel are two paladins of Charlemagne: the titular non-existent knight, named Agilulf (he is in fact a lucid empty suit of armor), and an inexperienced and passionate young man, Rambaldo.

Agilulfo Emo Bertrandino dei Guildiverni e degli Altri di Corbentraz e Sura, knight of Selimpia Citeriore and Fez, is the titular character of the novel. Agilulfo animates an empty suit of armor solely through willpower and his faith in the cause of Charlemagne and his paladins. During Charlemagne's war against the Moors, Agilulfo is approached by Rambaldo di Rossiglione, an inexperienced and passionate young man who enlisted to avenge the death of his father, the late Marquis Gherardo, who was killed under the walls of Seville by the Argalif Isoarre. During Charlemagne's march with his paladins to face their enemies, they encounter Gurdulù, a vagabond who acts purely on instinct without reflection. By Charlemagne’s orders, Gurdulù is assigned as Agilulfo’s squire. Agilulfo lacks "physical individuality," while Gurdulù lacks "conscious individuality."

At the end of the book, it is revealed that the entire story is narrated by Sister Teodora, a nun of the Order of Saint Columban, who was tasked with this duty by the mother superior of her convent.

When the battle begins, Rambaldo seeks every opportunity to confront his father’s killer. However, the Argalif does not die in direct combat with Rambaldo but because, being very nearsighted, he cannot fight effectively without his glasses. Rambaldo mistakenly duels the Argalif’s "glasses bearer," breaking the spare pair. Without proper vision, the Argalif impales himself on an enemy’s lance. Later, Rambaldo is ambushed but is saved by another knight, clad in a periwinkle breastplate, who leaves without a word after the battle. While returning to camp on foot, Rambaldo discovers that this valorous knight is actually a beautiful woman named Bradamante, and he immediately falls in love with her. However, Bradamante is not interested in Rambaldo but rather in Agilulfo, the non-existent knight whom she considers the most perfect embodiment of knighthood and manhood.

During a banquet, the young Torrismondo reveals unexpected facts about Agilulfo: he claims that Sofronia, the daughter of the King of Scotland, the woman Agilulfo had saved from two bandits, is his mother. If true, Agilulfo’s knighthood—granted for rescuing a virgin—would be invalid. Unwilling to believe this revelation, Agilulfo sets out to find Sofronia to prove that she was still a virgin at the time. Bradamante pursues Agilulfo, and Rambaldo, madly in love with Bradamante, follows her. That same night, Torrismondo departs to find his father, one of the knights of the "Sacred Order of the Knights of the Grail," and to be recognized as his son. Torrismondo eventually finds the Grail knights, who turn out to be a mystical sect detached from reality and devoid of ethical consciousness or tolerance for outsiders.

After various adventures, Agilulfo finds Sofronia. Torrismondo also arrives near the cave where his supposed mother is hiding. Both succumb to passion, undoing Agilulfo’s efforts. It is eventually revealed that Torrismondo is neither Sofronia’s son nor her half-brother, as initially assumed. Instead, he is the son of the Queen of Scotland and the Sacred Order, while Sofronia is the daughter of the King of Scotland and a peasant. Thus, the two are free to love each other, and Agilulfo’s knighthood remains valid. However, losing his sense of perfection, Agilulfo dissolves, leaving his white armor to Rambaldo, who henceforth fights in it. But being imperfect, like all other knights, he soon tarnishes the once-immaculate armor.

At this point, a Moorish army lands on the coast, led by a nobleman from whose harem Sofronia had been freed. A battle ensues between Christians and Saracens. During the final Christian victory, Bradamante, mistaking Rambaldo for Agilulfo, embraces him with closed eyes. Rambaldo removes the armor to reveal his identity, but Bradamante, opening her eyes only afterward, rejects him and flees in anger.

Later, Sofronia and Torrismondo, now married, and Gurdulù settle in a village once raided by Templars and defended by Torrismondo. Though Charlemagne names Torrismondo Count of the lands, the villagers, who defeated the Templars on their own, refuse to acknowledge him as such, realizing they can win without any knight's help.

It is revealed that Sister Teodora, who narrated the story, and the warrior Bradamante are the same person. When Rambaldo, who has never stopped searching for her, finally arrives at her monastery, he reveals his identity; Bradamante accepts him, and they set off together into an uncertain but promising future.

== Themes ==
Agilulf exists only as the fulfilment of the rules and protocols of knighthood. This theme is strongly connected to modern conditions: Agilulf has been described as "the symbol of the 'robotized' man, who performs bureaucratic acts with near-absolute unconsciousness." The romance satirises Agilulf as the ideal man yet nonexistent along with many suggestions that Sister Theodora is making up most of the story. In the end, she understands that such a perfect knight could live only in one's imagination.

The idea of confusion of one's own identity with others and the outside world continued to be developed in Calvino's later works.

== Reception ==
The Nonexistent Knight was collected together with The Cloven Viscount and The Baron in the Trees in a single volume, Our Ancestors, for which Calvino was awarded the Salento Prize in 1960. The book was adapted into an animated film by Italian director Pino Zac in 1970.

== Sources ==
- McLaughlin, Martin (1998). Italo Calvino. Edinburgh University Press. ISBN 0-7486-0917-2.
