= Van Andel =

Van Andel is a Dutch toponymic surname meaning "from/of Andel", a town in North Brabant. Notable people with the surname include:

- Hendrikje van Andel-Schipper (1890–2005), Dutch supercentenarian, oldest Dutch person
- Jan van Andel (1877–1972), Dutch Lieutenant general of the Royal Netherlands Army
- Jay Van Andel (1924–2004), American businessman, co-founder of the Amway Corporation
- Olaf van Andel (born 1984), Dutch rower
- Pek van Andel, Dutch experimental ophthalmologist and researcher on serendipity
- Tjeerd van Andel (1923–2010), Dutch-born American geo-archaeologist and oceanographer

== See also ==
- Van Andel Arena, Multi-purpose arena in Grand Rapids, Michigan, named for Jay Van Andel
- Van Andel Institute, American biomedical research and science education institute founded by Jay Van Andel
