= Abulfeda (crater) =

Lunar impact crater

Abulfeda Crater
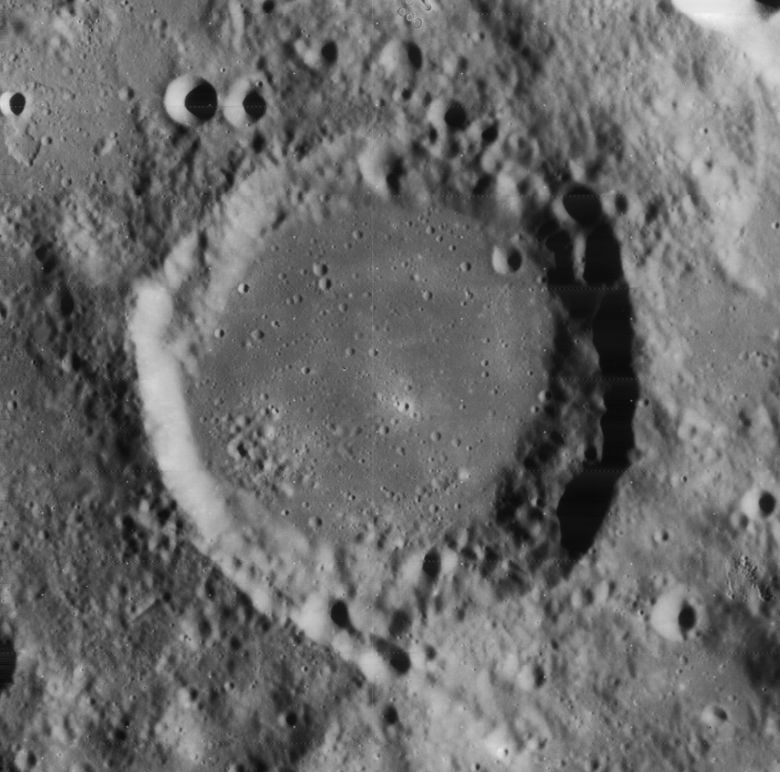
- Lunar Orbiter 4 image
- Coordinates: 13.8°S 13.9°E
- Diameter: 62.23 km (38.67 mi)
- Depth: 3.1 km
- Colongitude: 346° at sunrise
- Formation: Nectarian
- Eponym: Ismael Abul-fida

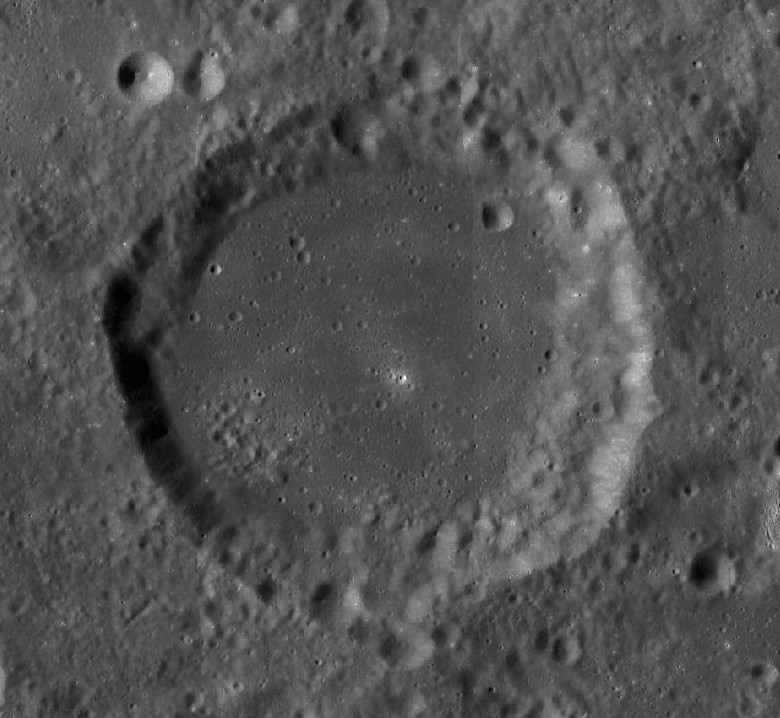
LRO WAC mosaic

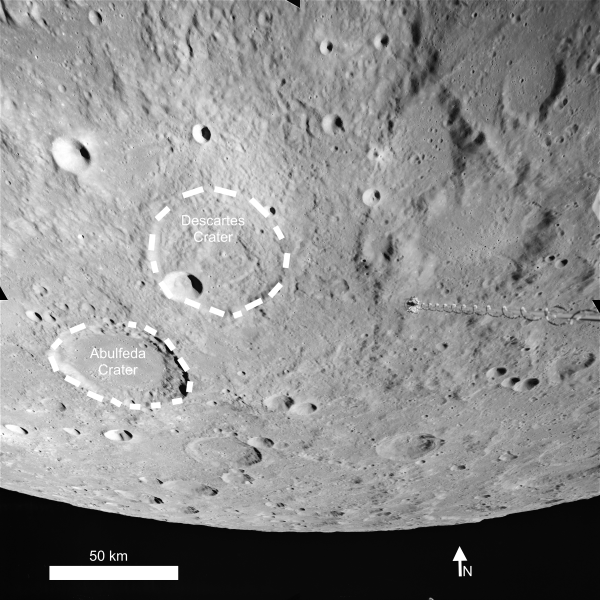
Abulfeda and Descartes craters NASA Image

Abulfeda is a lunar impact crater located in the central highlands of the Moon. To the northeast is the crater Descartes, and to the south-southeast is Almanon. To the north is the crater Dollond. A chain of craters named the Catena Abulfeda runs between the southern rim of Abulfeda and the north rim of Almanon, then continues for a length of 210 kilometers across the Rupes Altai. The crater was named for 14th century Kurdish historian Ismael Abul-fida.

On the lunar geologic timescale, Abulfeda dates to the Nectarian age. Both the south and northeast sides of the crater rim are overlain by multiple small craterlets. The inner wall is noticeably wider in the east, and shallow and worn to the north. The crater floor has been resurfaced, either by ejecta from the Mare Imbrium or by basaltic lava, and is relatively smooth and featureless. The crater lacks a central rise at the midpoint, which may have been buried. The inner sides appear to have been somewhat smoothed down, most likely as a result of minor bombardment and seismic shaking from other impacts in the vicinity.

A crater chain along the southern rim of Abulfeda was considered for a landing site of an early Apollo mission, primarily because it was considered to be a typical highland site, and at the time, crater chains were thought to possibly be volcanic in nature (rather than of impact origin).

== Satellite craters ==
By convention these features are identified on lunar maps by placing the letter on the side of the crater midpoint that is closest to Abulfeda.

| Abulfeda | Latitude | Longitude | Diameter |
|---|---|---|---|
| A | 16.4° S | 10.8° E | 14 km |
| B | 14.5° S | 16.4° E | 15 km |
| BA | 14.6° S | 16.8° E | 13 km |
| C | 12.8° S | 10.9° E | 17 km |
| D | 13.2° S | 9.5° E | 20 km |
| E | 16.7° S | 10.2° E | 6 km |
| F | 16.2° S | 13.0° E | 13 km |
| G | 13.1° S | 9.0° E | 7 km |
| H | 13.8° S | 9.6° E | 5 km |
| J | 15.5° S | 10.0° E | 5 km |
| K | 14.9° S | 10.6° E | 10 km |
| L | 14.1° S | 10.7° E | 5 km |
| M | 16.2° S | 12.1° E | 10 km |
| N | 15.1° S | 12.2° E | 14 km |
| O | 15.4° S | 11.2° E | 7 km |
| P | 15.5° S | 11.5° E | 5 km |
| Q | 12.8° S | 12.3° E | 3 km |
| R | 12.8° S | 13.0° E | 7 km |
| S | 12.2° S | 13.3° E | 5 km |
| T | 14.8° S | 13.8° E | 7 km |
| U | 13.0° S | 13.8° E | 6 km |
| W | 12.5° S | 13.9° E | 5 km |
| X | 15.0° S | 14.0° E | 6 km |
| Y | 12.8° S | 14.1° E | 5 km |
| Z | 14.7° S | 15.2° E | 5 km |

== Satellite crater Abulfeda E during full moon ==
Bowl-shaped craterlet Abulfeda E, westsouthwest of Abulfeda, is a bright white looking and telescopic eye-catching object during full moon. Abulfeda E is part of an east-west oriented line, of which craters Abulfeda A, Abulfeda F, Abulfeda M, Airy A, and Argelander D are its brightest members. West of Argelander D, a swirl pattern is discernible. This swirl pattern is located at the region which is called Loró Basin on the Rand McNally moonmap. The brightness of Abulfeda E is also noticeable on the photographic version of chart LAC 96 (page 192) in The Clementine Atlas of the Moon (Ben Bussey / Paul D. Spudis). The swirl pattern west of Argelander D is noticeable on LAC 95 (page 190).
