= Jan Worst =

Dutch painter

Jan Worst (ca.1635, Amsterdam? – ca.1686, Amsterdam), was a Dutch Golden Age painter.

The Dutch artist and art historian Arnold Houbraken described Worst as a painter of Italianate landscapes that were quite good, but he spent most of his time making drawings which were popular among collectors. He travelled to Italy, where he spent time with his friend and colleague Johannes Lingelbach.

According to The Netherlands Institute for Art History (the RKD) Worst was in Rome from 1645-1650, and in France in 1655-1656. He is known today for his landscape drawings of ruins.
