= The Cloven Viscount =

1952 fantasy novel by Italo Calvino

Cover of the first US edition, published by Random House.

The Cloven Viscount (Italian: Il visconte dimezzato) is a fantasy novel by Italian writer Italo Calvino. It was first published by Einaudi (Turin) in 1952 and in English in 1962 by William Collins, with a translation by Archibald Colquhoun.

The Cloven Viscount was collected together with The Baron in the Trees and The Nonexistent Knight in a single volume, Our Ancestors, for which Calvino was awarded the Salento Prize in 1960.

== Plot ==
The Viscount Medardo of Terralba and his squire Kurt ride across the plague-ravaged plain of Bohemia en route to join the Christian army in the Turkish wars of the seventeenth century. On the first day of fighting, a Turkish swordsman unhorses the inexperienced Viscount. Fearless, he scrambles over the battlefield with sword bared and is split longitudinally in two by a cannonball hitting him squarely in the chest.

As a result of the injury, Viscount Medardo becomes two people: Gramo (the Bad) and Buono (the Good). The army field doctors save Gramo through a stitching miracle: the Viscount is "alive and cloven". With one eye and a dilated single nostril, he returns to Terralba, twisting the half mouth of his half face into a scissors-like half smile. Meanwhile, a group of hermits find Buono in the bushes. They treat him and he recovers. After a long pilgrimage, Buono returns home.

There are now two viscounts in Terralba. Gramo lives in the castle, Buono lives in the forest. Gramo causes damage and pain, while Buono does good deeds. Pietrochiodo, the carpenter, is more adept at building guillotines for Gramo than the machines requested by Buono. Eventually, the villagers dislike both viscounts, as Gramo's malevolence provokes hostility and Buono's altruism provokes uneasiness.

Pamela, the peasant, prefers Buono to Gramo, but her parents want her to marry Gramo. She is ordered to consent to Gramo's marriage proposal. On the day of the wedding, Pamela marries Buono, because Gramo arrives late. Gramo challenges Buono to a duel to decide who shall be Pamela's husband. As a result, they are both severely wounded.

Dr. Trelawney takes the two bodies and sews the two sides together. Medardo finally is whole. He and his wife Pamela (now the Viscountess) live happily together until the end of their days.
