= The Baron in the Trees =

1957 novel by Italo Calvino

- First edition
- Author: Italo Calvino
- Original title: Il barone rampante
- Language: Italian
- Genre: Fiction novel
- Published: 1957
- Publisher: Giulio Einaudi
- ISBN: 0156106809

The Baron in the Trees (Italian: Il barone rampante lit. 'The Rampant Baron') is a 1957 novel by Italian writer Italo Calvino. Described as a conte philosophique and a metaphor for independence, it tells the adventures of a boy who climbs up a tree to spend the rest of his life inhabiting an arboreal kingdom. Calvino published a new version of the novel in 1959.

== Plot ==
Set in an imaginary village on the Ligurian Riviera, Ombrosa represents the author's vision as a central theme, little inclined to judgments and dull opinions.

The novel is narrated by Biagio, the younger brother of the protagonist, and is the story of a young baron, Cosimo Piovasco di Rondò, firstborn of a noble family sadly behind the times. The main story begins with a dispute on June 15, 1767 in the villa of Ombrosa, between an adolescent Cosimo and his father, after which Cosimo, who had quarreled with his father because he had refused to eat a snail soup, climbs the trees of the home garden and promises never to come down again in his entire life.

After the quarrel, Cosimo's life takes place in the trees; first in the family garden and then in the surrounding woods. Cosimo's life is full of adventures, from friendships with fruit thieves and bandits to days spent hunting or reading. In the life of the baron there is no lack of amorous encounters either. Cosimo's fame spreads quickly. At first, he becomes famous as a freak show and his family is almost ashamed of him, but later he also finds a way to win the respect of the Ombrosa community. The return of Viola, his first love, triggers a mutual feeling, always existent, which sadly ends due to a series of misunderstandings. The love between the two is strong, even if the relationship is filled with furious quarrels. Its end comes about in an unusual way: aged and sick, feeling the onset of death, Cosimo climbs to the top of a large walnut tree and hangs himself on a passing balloon. Thus, without betraying his promise to never set foot on the earth again, he disappears into the sky, without even giving the earth his remains.

== Reception ==
The Baron in the Trees is the second volume in the fantasy trilogy Our Ancestors, together with The Cloven Viscount (1952) and The Nonexistent Knight (1959). The novel received the Viareggio Prize in 1957.

On publication, various Italian critics complained of "the 'tired' feel of the plot in the second half of the novel" while novelist and critic Elio Vittorini considered the "stylistic disunity between the early and later chapters" was a problem. Despite these perceived flaws, critic Martin McLaughlin argues that the novel "remains something of a tour de force in Calvino's oeuvre. It is an extraordinarily successful attempt to reproduce a utopian, philosophical conte for the 1950s, with a whole range of intertextual allusions and a sophisticated parody of the poetics of the early English moralising novel as practised by Richardson and parodied by Fielding".

Together with If on a winter's night a traveler (1979), The Baron in the Trees is Calvino's best-selling work of fiction.
