= Karel Anděl =

Czech astronomer and selenographer

Karel Anděl (28 December 1884 – 17 March 1947) was a Czechoslovak astronomer and selenographer. His Mappa Selenographica has been used in Norton's Star Atlas.

== Bibliography ==
- Mappa Selenographica, 1926, Prague.

== Awards and honors ==
The following astronomical features were named for him:

- Anděl (crater) on the Moon
- The asteroid "1997 AK_{18}" was named 22465 Karelanděl
- The moon crater Anděl was named after him.
