= List of minor planets: 22001–23000 =

The following is a partial list of minor planets, running from minor-planet number 22001 through 23000, inclusive. The primary data for this and other partial lists is based on JPL's "Small-Body Orbital Elements" and data available from the Minor Planet Center. Critical list information is also provided by the MPC, unless otherwise specified from Lowell Observatory. A detailed description of the table's columns and additional sources are given on the main page including a complete list of every page in this series, and a statistical break-up on the dynamical classification of minor planets.

Also see the summary list of all named bodies in numerical and alphabetical order, and the corresponding naming citations for the number range of this particular list. New namings may only be added to this list after official publication, as the preannouncement of names is condemned by the Working Group for Small Bodies Nomenclature of the International Astronomical Union.

Near-Earth obj.	MBA (inner)	MBA (outer)	Centaur
Mars-crosser	MBA (middle)	Jupiter trojan	Trans-Neptunian obj.
Unclassified

== 22001–22100 ==
Designation			Discovery			Properties		Ref
Permanent	Provisional	Named after	Date	Site	Discoverer(s)	Category	Diam.	Ref
22001 Philharrington	1999 XY_{41}	Philharrington	December 7, 1999	Socorro	LINEAR	·	9.9 km	MPC · JPL
22002 Richardregan	1999 XB_{42}	Richardregan	December 7, 1999	Socorro	LINEAR	·	3.5 km	MPC · JPL
22003 Startek	1999 XO_{42}	Startek	December 7, 1999	Socorro	LINEAR	KOR	3.9 km	MPC · JPL
22004	1999 XF_{45}	—	December 7, 1999	Socorro	LINEAR	PHO	4.6 km	MPC · JPL
22005 Willnelson	1999 XK_{47}	Willnelson	December 7, 1999	Socorro	LINEAR	·	5.7 km	MPC · JPL
22006	1999 XP_{51}	—	December 7, 1999	Socorro	LINEAR	·	10 km	MPC · JPL
22007	1999 XQ_{57}	—	December 7, 1999	Socorro	LINEAR	EOS	5.4 km	MPC · JPL
22008	1999 XM_{71}	—	December 7, 1999	Socorro	LINEAR	L4	25 km	MPC · JPL
22009	1999 XK_{77}	—	December 7, 1999	Socorro	LINEAR	L4	22 km	MPC · JPL
22010 Kuzmina	1999 XM_{78}	Kuzmina	December 7, 1999	Socorro	LINEAR	L4	20 km	MPC · JPL
22011	1999 XR_{81}	—	December 7, 1999	Socorro	LINEAR	TIR	8.9 km	MPC · JPL
22012	1999 XO_{82}	—	December 7, 1999	Socorro	LINEAR	L4	20 km	MPC · JPL
22013	1999 XO_{89}	—	December 7, 1999	Socorro	LINEAR	GEF	5.8 km	MPC · JPL
22014	1999 XQ_{96}	—	December 7, 1999	Socorro	LINEAR	L4	39 km	MPC · JPL
22015	1999 XM_{100}	—	December 7, 1999	Socorro	LINEAR	EOS	9.8 km	MPC · JPL
22016	1999 XU_{101}	—	December 7, 1999	Socorro	LINEAR	EOS	9.1 km	MPC · JPL
22017	1999 XT_{104}	—	December 10, 1999	Oizumi	T. Kobayashi	EOS	8.4 km	MPC · JPL
22018	1999 XK_{105}	—	December 8, 1999	Nachi-Katsuura	Y. Shimizu, T. Urata	EOS	7.5 km	MPC · JPL
22019 Leviticusalewis	1999 XU_{106}	Leviticusalewis	December 4, 1999	Catalina	CSS	·	3.6 km	MPC · JPL
22020 Joshuahandal	1999 XG_{108}	Joshuahandal	December 4, 1999	Catalina	CSS	THM	11 km	MPC · JPL
22021 Andreariley	1999 XQ_{108}	Andreariley	December 4, 1999	Catalina	CSS	THM	9.0 km	MPC · JPL
22022 Gould	1999 XR_{110}	Gould	December 5, 1999	Catalina	CSS	(2076)	4.6 km	MPC · JPL
22023	1999 XH_{114}	—	December 11, 1999	Socorro	LINEAR	·	7.6 km	MPC · JPL
22024	1999 XY_{114}	—	December 11, 1999	Socorro	LINEAR	EUN	6.0 km	MPC · JPL
22025 Dorisdaou	1999 XS_{118}	Dorisdaou	December 5, 1999	Catalina	CSS	GEF	4.3 km	MPC · JPL
22026 Lindabillings	1999 XS_{119}	Lindabillings	December 5, 1999	Catalina	CSS	·	10 km	MPC · JPL
22027 Romanakofler	1999 XS_{120}	Romanakofler	December 5, 1999	Catalina	CSS	V	3.0 km	MPC · JPL
22028 Matthewdaniels	1999 XP_{125}	Matthewdaniels	December 7, 1999	Catalina	CSS	·	3.4 km	MPC · JPL
22029 Johnshaw	1999 XN_{126}	Johnshaw	December 7, 1999	Catalina	CSS	·	5.1 km	MPC · JPL
22030	1999 XU_{127}	—	December 7, 1999	Črni Vrh	H. Mikuž, S. Matičič	·	5.7 km	MPC · JPL
22031	1999 XA_{137}	—	December 14, 1999	Fountain Hills	C. W. Juels	EOS	6.6 km	MPC · JPL
22032 Mikekoop	1999 XB_{151}	Mikekoop	December 9, 1999	Anderson Mesa	LONEOS	EUN	3.8 km	MPC · JPL
22033	1999 XH_{154}	—	December 8, 1999	Socorro	LINEAR	·	4.8 km	MPC · JPL
22034	1999 XL_{168}	—	December 10, 1999	Socorro	LINEAR	slow	5.5 km	MPC · JPL
22035	1999 XR_{170}	—	December 10, 1999	Socorro	LINEAR	L4	24 km	MPC · JPL
22036	1999 XL_{181}	—	December 12, 1999	Socorro	LINEAR	·	9.5 km	MPC · JPL
22037	1999 XQ_{181}	—	December 12, 1999	Socorro	LINEAR	·	8.3 km	MPC · JPL
22038 Margarshain	1999 XJ_{182}	Margarshain	December 12, 1999	Socorro	LINEAR	(883)	2.1 km	MPC · JPL
22039	1999 XA_{185}	—	December 12, 1999	Socorro	LINEAR	EOS	5.8 km	MPC · JPL
22040	1999 XR_{188}	—	December 12, 1999	Socorro	LINEAR	EOS	9.7 km	MPC · JPL
22041	1999 XK_{192}	—	December 12, 1999	Socorro	LINEAR	L4	22 km	MPC · JPL
22042	1999 XP_{194}	—	December 12, 1999	Socorro	LINEAR	L4	20 km	MPC · JPL
22043	1999 XW_{204}	—	December 12, 1999	Socorro	LINEAR	·	17 km	MPC · JPL
22044	1999 XS_{206}	—	December 12, 1999	Socorro	LINEAR	(1101)	21 km	MPC · JPL
22045	1999 XD_{211}	—	December 13, 1999	Socorro	LINEAR	·	8.3 km	MPC · JPL
22046	1999 XU_{211}	—	December 13, 1999	Socorro	LINEAR	·	18 km	MPC · JPL
22047	1999 XU_{215}	—	December 15, 1999	Socorro	LINEAR	EUN	4.5 km	MPC · JPL
22048	1999 XK_{238}	—	December 3, 1999	Socorro	LINEAR	·	3.6 km	MPC · JPL
22049	1999 XW_{257}	—	December 7, 1999	Socorro	LINEAR	L4	19 km	MPC · JPL
22050	1999 YV_{13}	—	December 31, 1999	Višnjan Observatory	K. Korlević	·	16 km	MPC · JPL
22051	2000 AS_{7}	—	January 2, 2000	Socorro	LINEAR	·	10 km	MPC · JPL
22052	2000 AQ_{14}	—	January 3, 2000	Socorro	LINEAR	L4	28 km	MPC · JPL
22053	2000 AO_{17}	—	January 3, 2000	Socorro	LINEAR	ADE	11 km	MPC · JPL
22054	2000 AP_{21}	—	January 3, 2000	Socorro	LINEAR	L4	34 km	MPC · JPL
22055	2000 AS_{25}	—	January 3, 2000	Socorro	LINEAR	L4	32 km	MPC · JPL
22056	2000 AU_{31}	—	January 3, 2000	Socorro	LINEAR	L4	25 km	MPC · JPL
22057 Brianking	2000 AE_{52}	Brianking	January 4, 2000	Socorro	LINEAR	·	2.9 km	MPC · JPL
22058	2000 AA_{64}	—	January 4, 2000	Socorro	LINEAR	3:2	17 km	MPC · JPL
22059	2000 AD_{75}	—	January 5, 2000	Socorro	LINEAR	L4	25 km	MPC · JPL
22060	2000 AF_{76}	—	January 5, 2000	Socorro	LINEAR	EOS	8.6 km	MPC · JPL
22061	2000 AX_{98}	—	January 5, 2000	Socorro	LINEAR	·	5.2 km	MPC · JPL
22062	2000 AL_{99}	—	January 5, 2000	Socorro	LINEAR	HYG	9.5 km	MPC · JPL
22063 Dansealey	2000 AO_{99}	Dansealey	January 5, 2000	Socorro	LINEAR	·	3.5 km	MPC · JPL
22064 Angelalewis	2000 AQ_{99}	Angelalewis	January 5, 2000	Socorro	LINEAR	·	4.6 km	MPC · JPL
22065 Colgrove	2000 AZ_{99}	Colgrove	January 5, 2000	Socorro	LINEAR	·	3.5 km	MPC · JPL
22066	2000 AX_{100}	—	January 5, 2000	Socorro	LINEAR	·	11 km	MPC · JPL
22067	2000 AM_{101}	—	January 5, 2000	Socorro	LINEAR	·	5.1 km	MPC · JPL
22068	2000 AG_{103}	—	January 5, 2000	Socorro	LINEAR	·	10 km	MPC · JPL
22069	2000 AK_{105}	—	January 5, 2000	Socorro	LINEAR	EOS	9.3 km	MPC · JPL
22070	2000 AN_{106}	—	January 5, 2000	Socorro	LINEAR	T_{j} (2.94) · 3:2	19 km	MPC · JPL
22071	2000 AB_{107}	—	January 5, 2000	Socorro	LINEAR	URS	18 km	MPC · JPL
22072	2000 AT_{112}	—	January 5, 2000	Socorro	LINEAR	EOS	7.8 km	MPC · JPL
22073	2000 AX_{112}	—	January 5, 2000	Socorro	LINEAR	·	10 km	MPC · JPL
22074	2000 AB_{113}	—	January 5, 2000	Socorro	LINEAR	EOS	12 km	MPC · JPL
22075	2000 AL_{138}	—	January 5, 2000	Socorro	LINEAR	·	4.4 km	MPC · JPL
22076	2000 AZ_{138}	—	January 5, 2000	Socorro	LINEAR	NAE	9.4 km	MPC · JPL
22077	2000 AL_{140}	—	January 5, 2000	Socorro	LINEAR	·	3.5 km	MPC · JPL
22078	2000 AF_{149}	—	January 7, 2000	Socorro	LINEAR	ADE	7.7 km	MPC · JPL
22079 Kabinoff	2000 AU_{151}	Kabinoff	January 8, 2000	Socorro	LINEAR	(5)	4.4 km	MPC · JPL
22080 Emilevasseur	2000 AS_{161}	Emilevasseur	January 4, 2000	Socorro	LINEAR	V	3.2 km	MPC · JPL
22081	2000 AA_{165}	—	January 8, 2000	Socorro	LINEAR	·	5.1 km	MPC · JPL
22082 Rountree	2000 AD_{165}	Rountree	January 8, 2000	Socorro	LINEAR	·	4.6 km	MPC · JPL
22083	2000 AN_{165}	—	January 8, 2000	Socorro	LINEAR	·	20 km	MPC · JPL
22084	2000 AX_{168}	—	January 7, 2000	Socorro	LINEAR	·	3.7 km	MPC · JPL
22085	2000 AA_{169}	—	January 7, 2000	Socorro	LINEAR	EUN	3.9 km	MPC · JPL
22086	2000 AG_{170}	—	January 7, 2000	Socorro	LINEAR	·	16 km	MPC · JPL
22087	2000 AZ_{175}	—	January 7, 2000	Socorro	LINEAR	·	10 km	MPC · JPL
22088	2000 AT_{185}	—	January 8, 2000	Socorro	LINEAR	EUN	5.2 km	MPC · JPL
22089	2000 AA_{186}	—	January 8, 2000	Socorro	LINEAR	GEF · slow	4.0 km	MPC · JPL
22090	2000 AC_{186}	—	January 8, 2000	Socorro	LINEAR	·	9.4 km	MPC · JPL
22091	2000 AY_{186}	—	January 8, 2000	Socorro	LINEAR	·	7.5 km	MPC · JPL
22092	2000 AQ_{199}	—	January 9, 2000	Socorro	LINEAR	EUN	4.9 km	MPC · JPL
22093	2000 AG_{200}	—	January 9, 2000	Socorro	LINEAR	GEF · slow	3.7 km	MPC · JPL
22094	2000 AQ_{200}	—	January 9, 2000	Socorro	LINEAR	URS	12 km	MPC · JPL
22095	2000 AY_{204}	—	January 11, 2000	Socorro	LINEAR	URS	20 km	MPC · JPL
22096	2000 AF_{229}	—	January 3, 2000	Socorro	LINEAR	·	5.8 km	MPC · JPL
22097	2000 BH_{4}	—	January 21, 2000	Socorro	LINEAR	·	25 km	MPC · JPL
22098	2000 BJ_{16}	—	January 30, 2000	Socorro	LINEAR	·	12 km	MPC · JPL
22099	2000 EX_{106}	—	March 14, 2000	Catalina	CSS	APO +1km	520 m	MPC · JPL
22100	2000 GV_{93}	—	April 5, 2000	Socorro	LINEAR	EOS · slow	7.2 km	MPC · JPL

== 22101–22200 ==
back to top

Designation			Discovery			Properties		Ref
Permanent	Provisional	Named after	Date	Site	Discoverer(s)	Category	Diam.	Ref
22101	2000 JG_{15}	—	May 6, 2000	Socorro	LINEAR	·	9.4 km	MPC · JPL
22102 Karenlamb	2000 JR_{61}	Karenlamb	May 7, 2000	Socorro	LINEAR	·	4.9 km	MPC · JPL
22103	2000 LR_{17}	—	June 7, 2000	Socorro	LINEAR	·	5.4 km	MPC · JPL
22104	2000 LN_{19}	—	June 8, 2000	Socorro	LINEAR	slow	7.5 km	MPC · JPL
22105 Pirko	2000 LS_{36}	Pirko	June 11, 2000	Anderson Mesa	LONEOS	·	4.9 km	MPC · JPL
22106 Tomokoarai	2000 NC_{12}	Tomokoarai	July 5, 2000	Anderson Mesa	LONEOS	·	12 km	MPC · JPL
22107	2000 OV_{21}	—	July 31, 2000	Socorro	LINEAR	·	2.6 km	MPC · JPL
22108	2000 PD	—	August 1, 2000	Črni Vrh	Skvarč, J.	·	10 km	MPC · JPL
22109 Loriehutch	2000 PJ_{22}	Loriehutch	August 1, 2000	Socorro	LINEAR	·	2.2 km	MPC · JPL
22110	2000 QR_{7}	—	August 25, 2000	Socorro	LINEAR	slow	8.4 km	MPC · JPL
22111	2000 QK_{150}	—	August 25, 2000	Socorro	LINEAR	·	4.1 km	MPC · JPL
22112 Staceyraw	2000 QO_{181}	Staceyraw	August 31, 2000	Socorro	LINEAR	·	4.6 km	MPC · JPL
22113	2000 RH_{9}	—	September 1, 2000	Socorro	LINEAR	·	3.8 km	MPC · JPL
22114	2000 RB_{50}	—	September 5, 2000	Socorro	LINEAR	·	5.3 km	MPC · JPL
22115	2000 RB_{62}	—	September 1, 2000	Socorro	LINEAR	ADE	11 km	MPC · JPL
22116	2000 RK_{71}	—	September 2, 2000	Socorro	LINEAR	3:2	15 km	MPC · JPL
22117	2000 SX_{39}	—	September 24, 2000	Socorro	LINEAR	EUN	3.6 km	MPC · JPL
22118	2000 SL_{86}	—	September 24, 2000	Socorro	LINEAR	LIX	12 km	MPC · JPL
22119	2000 SA_{101}	—	September 23, 2000	Socorro	LINEAR	EUN	7.1 km	MPC · JPL
22120 Gaylefarrar	2000 SO_{102}	Gaylefarrar	September 24, 2000	Socorro	LINEAR	·	2.1 km	MPC · JPL
22121	2000 SM_{107}	—	September 24, 2000	Socorro	LINEAR	slow?	2.8 km	MPC · JPL
22122	2000 SU_{155}	—	September 24, 2000	Socorro	LINEAR	EOS	7.0 km	MPC · JPL
22123	2000 SG_{172}	—	September 27, 2000	Socorro	LINEAR	EOS · slow	14 km	MPC · JPL
22124	2000 ST_{183}	—	September 20, 2000	Haleakala	NEAT	·	2.0 km	MPC · JPL
22125	2000 SH_{186}	—	September 30, 2000	Socorro	LINEAR	EUN	6.0 km	MPC · JPL
22126	2000 SR_{187}	—	September 21, 2000	Haleakala	NEAT	EOS	6.7 km	MPC · JPL
22127	2000 SZ_{226}	—	September 27, 2000	Socorro	LINEAR	GEF	4.4 km	MPC · JPL
22128	2000 SH_{242}	—	September 24, 2000	Socorro	LINEAR	·	4.8 km	MPC · JPL
22129	2000 SD_{311}	—	September 26, 2000	Socorro	LINEAR	·	14 km	MPC · JPL
22130	2000 UT_{3}	—	October 31, 2000	Socorro	LINEAR	·	3.3 km	MPC · JPL
22131	2000 UK_{4}	—	October 24, 2000	Socorro	LINEAR	·	4.7 km	MPC · JPL
22132 Merkley	2000 UD_{21}	Merkley	October 24, 2000	Socorro	LINEAR	KOR	3.5 km	MPC · JPL
22133	2000 UO_{56}	—	October 24, 2000	Socorro	LINEAR	EOS	5.7 km	MPC · JPL
22134 Kirian	2000 UA_{66}	Kirian	October 25, 2000	Socorro	LINEAR	·	6.0 km	MPC · JPL
22135	2000 UA_{100}	—	October 25, 2000	Socorro	LINEAR	EUN	6.5 km	MPC · JPL
22136 Jamesharrison	2000 VJ_{3}	Jamesharrison	November 1, 2000	Desert Beaver	W. K. Y. Yeung	·	2.7 km	MPC · JPL
22137 Annettelee	2000 VM_{15}	Annettelee	November 1, 2000	Socorro	LINEAR	fast	3.0 km	MPC · JPL
22138 Laynrichards	2000 VD_{25}	Laynrichards	November 1, 2000	Socorro	LINEAR	·	7.5 km	MPC · JPL
22139 Jamescox	2000 VU_{28}	Jamescox	November 1, 2000	Socorro	LINEAR	·	4.9 km	MPC · JPL
22140 Suzyamamoto	2000 VW_{32}	Suzyamamoto	November 1, 2000	Socorro	LINEAR	·	3.2 km	MPC · JPL
22141	2000 VH_{36}	—	November 1, 2000	Socorro	LINEAR	·	4.5 km	MPC · JPL
22142 Loripryor	2000 VC_{37}	Loripryor	November 1, 2000	Socorro	LINEAR	·	2.5 km	MPC · JPL
22143 Cathyfowler	2000 VL_{37}	Cathyfowler	November 1, 2000	Socorro	LINEAR	·	2.4 km	MPC · JPL
22144 Linmichaels	2000 VM_{37}	Linmichaels	November 1, 2000	Socorro	LINEAR	·	3.2 km	MPC · JPL
22145	2000 WJ_{17}	—	November 21, 2000	Socorro	LINEAR	·	2.8 km	MPC · JPL
22146 Samaan	2000 WM_{23}	Samaan	November 20, 2000	Socorro	LINEAR	·	6.5 km	MPC · JPL
22147	2000 WP_{32}	—	November 20, 2000	Socorro	LINEAR	·	11 km	MPC · JPL
22148 Francislee	2000 WH_{46}	Francislee	November 21, 2000	Socorro	LINEAR	·	4.6 km	MPC · JPL
22149 Cinyras	2000 WD_{49}	Cinyras	November 21, 2000	Socorro	LINEAR	L4	48 km	MPC · JPL
22150	2000 WM_{49}	—	November 21, 2000	Socorro	LINEAR	PHO	7.3 km	MPC · JPL
22151 Davebracy	2000 WM_{56}	Davebracy	November 21, 2000	Socorro	LINEAR	KOR	3.6 km	MPC · JPL
22152 Robbennett	2000 WG_{57}	Robbennett	November 21, 2000	Socorro	LINEAR	NYS	2.6 km	MPC · JPL
22153 Kathbarnhart	2000 WT_{58}	Kathbarnhart	November 21, 2000	Socorro	LINEAR	·	2.1 km	MPC · JPL
22154	2000 WV_{72}	—	November 20, 2000	Socorro	LINEAR	·	7.9 km	MPC · JPL
22155 Marchetti	2000 WQ_{88}	Marchetti	November 20, 2000	Socorro	LINEAR	V	2.6 km	MPC · JPL
22156 Richoffman	2000 WQ_{94}	Richoffman	November 21, 2000	Socorro	LINEAR	·	6.4 km	MPC · JPL
22157 Bryanhoran	2000 WQ_{99}	Bryanhoran	November 21, 2000	Socorro	LINEAR	THM	8.5 km	MPC · JPL
22158 Chee	2000 WG_{101}	Chee	November 21, 2000	Socorro	LINEAR	·	3.5 km	MPC · JPL
22159	2000 WW_{116}	—	November 20, 2000	Socorro	LINEAR	·	4.4 km	MPC · JPL
22160	2000 WP_{120}	—	November 20, 2000	Socorro	LINEAR	(5)	4.8 km	MPC · JPL
22161 Santagata	2000 WR_{123}	Santagata	November 29, 2000	Socorro	LINEAR	·	3.3 km	MPC · JPL
22162 Leslijohnson	2000 WS_{123}	Leslijohnson	November 29, 2000	Socorro	LINEAR	(5)	3.9 km	MPC · JPL
22163	2000 WF_{125}	—	November 26, 2000	Socorro	LINEAR	·	5.3 km	MPC · JPL
22164	2000 WE_{135}	—	November 19, 2000	Socorro	LINEAR	ADE · slow	7.6 km	MPC · JPL
22165 Kathydouglas	2000 WX_{137}	Kathydouglas	November 20, 2000	Socorro	LINEAR	·	1.9 km	MPC · JPL
22166	2000 WX_{154}	—	November 30, 2000	Socorro	LINEAR	slow	4.7 km	MPC · JPL
22167 Lane-Cline	2000 WP_{157}	Lane-Cline	November 30, 2000	Socorro	LINEAR	·	2.3 km	MPC · JPL
22168 Weissflog	2000 WX_{158}	Weissflog	November 30, 2000	Drebach	J. Kandler, G. Lehmann	·	2.4 km	MPC · JPL
22169	2000 WP_{165}	—	November 23, 2000	Haleakala	NEAT	·	6.3 km	MPC · JPL
22170	2000 WE_{175}	—	November 26, 2000	Socorro	LINEAR	EUN	5.0 km	MPC · JPL
22171 Choi	2000 WK_{179}	Choi	November 26, 2000	Socorro	LINEAR	·	7.5 km	MPC · JPL
22172	2000 XQ_{11}	—	December 4, 2000	Socorro	LINEAR	MAR	4.2 km	MPC · JPL
22173 Myersdavis	2000 XE_{25}	Myersdavis	December 4, 2000	Socorro	LINEAR	·	4.7 km	MPC · JPL
22174 Allisonmae	2000 XG_{28}	Allisonmae	December 4, 2000	Socorro	LINEAR	·	3.6 km	MPC · JPL
22175	2000 XS_{29}	—	December 4, 2000	Socorro	LINEAR	·	5.3 km	MPC · JPL
22176	2000 XG_{36}	—	December 5, 2000	Socorro	LINEAR	PHO	6.5 km	MPC · JPL
22177 Saotome	2000 XS_{38}	Saotome	December 6, 2000	Bisei SG Center	BATTeRS	·	22 km	MPC · JPL
22178	2000 XW_{40}	—	December 5, 2000	Socorro	LINEAR	·	3.0 km	MPC · JPL
22179	2000 YY	—	December 17, 2000	Višnjan Observatory	K. Korlević	·	4.8 km	MPC · JPL
22180 Paeon	2000 YZ	Paeon	December 19, 2000	Anderson Mesa	LONEOS	L5	40 km	MPC · JPL
22181	2000 YA_{6}	—	December 20, 2000	Socorro	LINEAR	·	3.8 km	MPC · JPL
22182	2000 YR_{9}	—	December 22, 2000	Kitt Peak	Spacewatch	·	4.0 km	MPC · JPL
22183 Canonlau	2000 YE_{12}	Canonlau	December 23, 2000	Desert Beaver	W. K. Y. Yeung	EUN	5.3 km	MPC · JPL
22184 Rudolfveltman	2000 YT_{15}	Rudolfveltman	December 22, 2000	Anderson Mesa	LONEOS	·	3.7 km	MPC · JPL
22185 Štiavnica	2000 YV_{28}	Štiavnica	December 29, 2000	Ondřejov	P. Kušnirák, U. Babiaková	·	21 km	MPC · JPL
22186	2000 YO_{30}	—	December 29, 2000	Haleakala	NEAT	·	3.2 km	MPC · JPL
22187	2000 YZ_{33}	—	December 28, 2000	Socorro	LINEAR	·	12 km	MPC · JPL
22188	2000 YU_{61}	—	December 30, 2000	Socorro	LINEAR	·	3.5 km	MPC · JPL
22189 Gijskatgert	2049 P-L	Gijskatgert	September 24, 1960	Palomar	C. J. van Houten, I. van Houten-Groeneveld, T. Gehrels	·	2.9 km	MPC · JPL
22190 Stellakwee	2100 P-L	Stellakwee	September 24, 1960	Palomar	C. J. van Houten, I. van Houten-Groeneveld, T. Gehrels	·	9.9 km	MPC · JPL
22191 Achúcarro	2113 P-L	Achúcarro	September 24, 1960	Palomar	C. J. van Houten, I. van Houten-Groeneveld, T. Gehrels	·	3.6 km	MPC · JPL
22192 Vivienreuter	2571 P-L	Vivienreuter	September 24, 1960	Palomar	C. J. van Houten, I. van Houten-Groeneveld, T. Gehrels	slow	7.4 km	MPC · JPL
22193	2712 P-L	—	September 24, 1960	Palomar	C. J. van Houten, I. van Houten-Groeneveld, T. Gehrels	·	2.7 km	MPC · JPL
22194	2740 P-L	—	September 24, 1960	Palomar	C. J. van Houten, I. van Houten-Groeneveld, T. Gehrels	·	3.5 km	MPC · JPL
22195 Nevadodelruiz	3509 P-L	Nevadodelruiz	October 17, 1960	Palomar	C. J. van Houten, I. van Houten-Groeneveld, T. Gehrels	H	3.5 km	MPC · JPL
22196	3518 P-L	—	October 17, 1960	Palomar	C. J. van Houten, I. van Houten-Groeneveld, T. Gehrels	·	5.5 km	MPC · JPL
22197	3555 P-L	—	October 22, 1960	Palomar	C. J. van Houten, I. van Houten-Groeneveld, T. Gehrels	V	2.7 km	MPC · JPL
22198	4080 P-L	—	September 24, 1960	Palomar	C. J. van Houten, I. van Houten-Groeneveld, T. Gehrels	·	8.1 km	MPC · JPL
22199 Klonios	4572 P-L	Klonios	September 24, 1960	Palomar	C. J. van Houten, I. van Houten-Groeneveld, T. Gehrels	L4	20 km	MPC · JPL
22200	4573 P-L	—	September 26, 1960	Palomar	C. J. van Houten, I. van Houten-Groeneveld, T. Gehrels	VER	9.0 km	MPC · JPL

== 22201–22300 ==
back to top

Designation			Discovery			Properties		Ref
Permanent	Provisional	Named after	Date	Site	Discoverer(s)	Category	Diam.	Ref
22201	4584 P-L	—	September 24, 1960	Palomar	C. J. van Houten, I. van Houten-Groeneveld, T. Gehrels	·	2.7 km	MPC · JPL
22202	4715 P-L	—	September 24, 1960	Palomar	C. J. van Houten, I. van Houten-Groeneveld, T. Gehrels	NYS ·	4.4 km	MPC · JPL
22203 Prothoenor	6020 P-L	Prothoenor	September 24, 1960	Palomar	C. J. van Houten, I. van Houten-Groeneveld, T. Gehrels	L4	25 km	MPC · JPL
22204	6121 P-L	—	September 24, 1960	Palomar	C. J. van Houten, I. van Houten-Groeneveld, T. Gehrels	THM	8.6 km	MPC · JPL
22205	6703 P-L	—	September 24, 1960	Palomar	C. J. van Houten, I. van Houten-Groeneveld, T. Gehrels	·	3.9 km	MPC · JPL
22206	6735 P-L	—	September 24, 1960	Palomar	C. J. van Houten, I. van Houten-Groeneveld, T. Gehrels	HYG	6.2 km	MPC · JPL
22207	7081 P-L	—	October 17, 1960	Palomar	C. J. van Houten, I. van Houten-Groeneveld, T. Gehrels	·	1.5 km	MPC · JPL
22208	7605 P-L	—	October 17, 1960	Palomar	C. J. van Houten, I. van Houten-Groeneveld, T. Gehrels	·	5.5 km	MPC · JPL
22209	1056 T-1	—	March 25, 1971	Palomar	C. J. van Houten, I. van Houten-Groeneveld, T. Gehrels	ADE	7.0 km	MPC · JPL
22210	2206 T-1	—	March 25, 1971	Palomar	C. J. van Houten, I. van Houten-Groeneveld, T. Gehrels	·	2.4 km	MPC · JPL
22211	3106 T-1	—	March 26, 1971	Palomar	C. J. van Houten, I. van Houten-Groeneveld, T. Gehrels	·	3.1 km	MPC · JPL
22212	3195 T-1	—	March 26, 1971	Palomar	C. J. van Houten, I. van Houten-Groeneveld, T. Gehrels	·	3.0 km	MPC · JPL
22213	4322 T-1	—	March 26, 1971	Palomar	C. J. van Houten, I. van Houten-Groeneveld, T. Gehrels	NYS	2.9 km	MPC · JPL
22214	4326 T-1	—	March 26, 1971	Palomar	C. J. van Houten, I. van Houten-Groeneveld, T. Gehrels	EOS	6.3 km	MPC · JPL
22215	1108 T-2	—	September 29, 1973	Palomar	C. J. van Houten, I. van Houten-Groeneveld, T. Gehrels	V	2.4 km	MPC · JPL
22216	1242 T-2	—	September 29, 1973	Palomar	C. J. van Houten, I. van Houten-Groeneveld, T. Gehrels	·	5.9 km	MPC · JPL
22217	1260 T-2	—	September 29, 1973	Palomar	C. J. van Houten, I. van Houten-Groeneveld, T. Gehrels	·	4.3 km	MPC · JPL
22218	2064 T-2	—	September 29, 1973	Palomar	C. J. van Houten, I. van Houten-Groeneveld, T. Gehrels	·	3.9 km	MPC · JPL
22219	2066 T-2	—	September 29, 1973	Palomar	C. J. van Houten, I. van Houten-Groeneveld, T. Gehrels	·	5.2 km	MPC · JPL
22220	2097 T-2	—	September 29, 1973	Palomar	C. J. van Houten, I. van Houten-Groeneveld, T. Gehrels	V	1.9 km	MPC · JPL
22221	2243 T-2	—	September 29, 1973	Palomar	C. J. van Houten, I. van Houten-Groeneveld, T. Gehrels	NYS	4.5 km	MPC · JPL
22222 Hodios	3156 T-2	Hodios	September 30, 1973	Palomar	C. J. van Houten, I. van Houten-Groeneveld, T. Gehrels	L4	20 km	MPC · JPL
22223	3232 T-2	—	September 30, 1973	Palomar	C. J. van Houten, I. van Houten-Groeneveld, T. Gehrels	·	2.8 km	MPC · JPL
22224	3270 T-2	—	September 30, 1973	Palomar	C. J. van Houten, I. van Houten-Groeneveld, T. Gehrels	NYS	3.2 km	MPC · JPL
22225	4091 T-2	—	September 29, 1973	Palomar	C. J. van Houten, I. van Houten-Groeneveld, T. Gehrels	MIS	6.5 km	MPC · JPL
22226	4328 T-2	—	September 29, 1973	Palomar	C. J. van Houten, I. van Houten-Groeneveld, T. Gehrels	·	2.5 km	MPC · JPL
22227 Polyxenos	5030 T-2	Polyxenos	September 25, 1973	Palomar	C. J. van Houten, I. van Houten-Groeneveld, T. Gehrels	L4	20 km	MPC · JPL
22228	5081 T-2	—	September 25, 1973	Palomar	C. J. van Houten, I. van Houten-Groeneveld, T. Gehrels	MAR	3.2 km	MPC · JPL
22229	5415 T-2	—	September 25, 1973	Palomar	C. J. van Houten, I. van Houten-Groeneveld, T. Gehrels	·	2.1 km	MPC · JPL
22230	1022 T-3	—	October 17, 1977	Palomar	C. J. van Houten, I. van Houten-Groeneveld, T. Gehrels	·	6.4 km	MPC · JPL
22231	2239 T-3	—	October 16, 1977	Palomar	C. J. van Houten, I. van Houten-Groeneveld, T. Gehrels	·	3.1 km	MPC · JPL
22232	2311 T-3	—	October 16, 1977	Palomar	C. J. van Houten, I. van Houten-Groeneveld, T. Gehrels	EOS	6.2 km	MPC · JPL
22233	3093 T-3	—	October 16, 1977	Palomar	C. J. van Houten, I. van Houten-Groeneveld, T. Gehrels	V	2.2 km	MPC · JPL
22234	3166 T-3	—	October 16, 1977	Palomar	C. J. van Houten, I. van Houten-Groeneveld, T. Gehrels	·	3.2 km	MPC · JPL
22235	3502 T-3	—	October 16, 1977	Palomar	C. J. van Houten, I. van Houten-Groeneveld, T. Gehrels	·	1.7 km	MPC · JPL
22236	3535 T-3	—	October 16, 1977	Palomar	C. J. van Houten, I. van Houten-Groeneveld, T. Gehrels	NYS	2.7 km	MPC · JPL
22237	3833 T-3	—	October 16, 1977	Palomar	C. J. van Houten, I. van Houten-Groeneveld, T. Gehrels	AST	4.1 km	MPC · JPL
22238	3854 T-3	—	October 16, 1977	Palomar	C. J. van Houten, I. van Houten-Groeneveld, T. Gehrels	·	7.5 km	MPC · JPL
22239	4030 T-3	—	October 16, 1977	Palomar	C. J. van Houten, I. van Houten-Groeneveld, T. Gehrels	·	4.3 km	MPC · JPL
22240	4039 T-3	—	October 16, 1977	Palomar	C. J. van Houten, I. van Houten-Groeneveld, T. Gehrels	·	3.5 km	MPC · JPL
22241	4072 T-3	—	October 16, 1977	Palomar	C. J. van Houten, I. van Houten-Groeneveld, T. Gehrels	HYG	10 km	MPC · JPL
22242	4080 T-3	—	October 16, 1977	Palomar	C. J. van Houten, I. van Houten-Groeneveld, T. Gehrels	EOS	6.0 km	MPC · JPL
22243	4141 T-3	—	October 16, 1977	Palomar	C. J. van Houten, I. van Houten-Groeneveld, T. Gehrels	·	6.5 km	MPC · JPL
22244	4235 T-3	—	October 16, 1977	Palomar	C. J. van Houten, I. van Houten-Groeneveld, T. Gehrels	·	5.7 km	MPC · JPL
22245	4309 T-3	—	October 16, 1977	Palomar	C. J. van Houten, I. van Houten-Groeneveld, T. Gehrels	·	3.6 km	MPC · JPL
22246	4380 T-3	—	October 16, 1977	Palomar	C. J. van Houten, I. van Houten-Groeneveld, T. Gehrels	·	3.1 km	MPC · JPL
22247	4611 T-3	—	October 16, 1977	Palomar	C. J. van Houten, I. van Houten-Groeneveld, T. Gehrels	·	8.2 km	MPC · JPL
22248	5029 T-3	—	October 16, 1977	Palomar	C. J. van Houten, I. van Houten-Groeneveld, T. Gehrels	·	8.8 km	MPC · JPL
22249 Dvorets Pionerov	1972 RF_{2}	Dvorets Pionerov	September 11, 1972	Nauchnij	N. S. Chernykh	·	5.5 km	MPC · JPL
22250 Konstfrolov	1978 RD_{2}	Konstfrolov	September 7, 1978	Nauchnij	T. M. Smirnova	(5)	3.6 km	MPC · JPL
22251 Eden	1978 RT_{6}	Eden	September 2, 1978	La Silla	C.-I. Lagerkvist	BAP	2.5 km	MPC · JPL
22252	1978 SG	—	September 27, 1978	La Silla	R. M. West	·	2.3 km	MPC · JPL
22253 Sivers	1978 SU_{7}	Sivers	September 26, 1978	Nauchnij	L. V. Zhuravleva	·	5.4 km	MPC · JPL
22254 Vladbarmin	1978 TV_{2}	Vladbarmin	October 3, 1978	Nauchnij	N. S. Chernykh	·	2.7 km	MPC · JPL
22255	1978 VX_{4}	—	November 7, 1978	Palomar	E. F. Helin, S. J. Bus	·	3.3 km	MPC · JPL
22256	1978 VP_{9}	—	November 7, 1978	Palomar	E. F. Helin, S. J. Bus	V	1.9 km	MPC · JPL
22257	1978 VJ_{10}	—	November 7, 1978	Palomar	E. F. Helin, S. J. Bus	LEO	5.8 km	MPC · JPL
22258	1979 MB_{3}	—	June 25, 1979	Siding Spring	E. F. Helin, S. J. Bus	·	4.5 km	MPC · JPL
22259	1979 MD_{5}	—	June 25, 1979	Siding Spring	E. F. Helin, S. J. Bus	GEF	3.7 km	MPC · JPL
22260 Ur	1979 UR	Ur	October 19, 1979	Kleť	A. Mrkos	·	9.7 km	MPC · JPL
22261	1980 AB	—	January 13, 1980	Kleť	Z. Vávrová	·	5.3 km	MPC · JPL
22262	1980 PZ_{2}	—	August 4, 1980	Siding Spring	Royal Observatory Edinburgh	PHO	7.3 km	MPC · JPL
22263 Pignedoli	1980 RC	Pignedoli	September 3, 1980	Bologna	San Vittore	·	5.8 km	MPC · JPL
22264	1981 EX_{8}	—	March 1, 1981	Siding Spring	S. J. Bus	·	3.8 km	MPC · JPL
22265	1981 EE_{11}	—	March 1, 1981	Siding Spring	S. J. Bus	·	2.3 km	MPC · JPL
22266	1981 EQ_{11}	—	March 7, 1981	Siding Spring	S. J. Bus	·	2.2 km	MPC · JPL
22267	1981 ET_{23}	—	March 3, 1981	Siding Spring	S. J. Bus	·	3.4 km	MPC · JPL
22268	1981 EJ_{26}	—	March 2, 1981	Siding Spring	S. J. Bus	·	3.0 km	MPC · JPL
22269	1981 EK_{27}	—	March 2, 1981	Siding Spring	S. J. Bus	·	3.4 km	MPC · JPL
22270	1981 EQ_{30}	—	March 2, 1981	Siding Spring	S. J. Bus	·	8.0 km	MPC · JPL
22271	1981 EZ_{32}	—	March 1, 1981	Siding Spring	S. J. Bus	·	4.1 km	MPC · JPL
22272	1981 EY_{39}	—	March 2, 1981	Siding Spring	S. J. Bus	·	1.4 km	MPC · JPL
22273	1981 QO_{3}	—	August 26, 1981	La Silla	H. Debehogne	·	2.2 km	MPC · JPL
22274	1981 RN	—	September 7, 1981	Kleť	A. Mrkos	·	3.9 km	MPC · JPL
22275 Barentsen	1982 BU	Barentsen	January 18, 1982	Anderson Mesa	E. Bowell	PHO	6.1 km	MPC · JPL
22276 Belkin	1982 UH_{9}	Belkin	October 21, 1982	Nauchnij	L. V. Zhuravleva	·	5.5 km	MPC · JPL
22277 Hirado	1982 VK_{4}	Hirado	November 14, 1982	Kiso	H. Kosai, K. Furukawa	·	4.1 km	MPC · JPL
22278 Protitch	1983 RT_{3}	Protitch	September 2, 1983	La Silla	H. Debehogne	EUN · fast	4.9 km	MPC · JPL
22279	1984 DM	—	February 23, 1984	La Silla	H. Debehogne	·	24 km	MPC · JPL
22280 Mandragora	1985 CD_{2}	Mandragora	February 12, 1985	La Silla	H. Debehogne	·	9.9 km	MPC · JPL
22281 Popescu	1985 PC	Popescu	August 14, 1985	Anderson Mesa	E. Bowell	·	3.5 km	MPC · JPL
22282 Dreyer	1985 RA	Dreyer	September 11, 1985	Brorfelde	Copenhagen Observatory	slow	5.9 km	MPC · JPL
22283 Pytheas	1986 PY	Pytheas	August 6, 1986	Smolyan	E. W. Elst, V. G. Ivanova	·	2.9 km	MPC · JPL
22284	1986 SH	—	September 30, 1986	Kleť	A. Mrkos	EUN	3.8 km	MPC · JPL
22285	1987 RR	—	September 3, 1987	La Silla	E. W. Elst	·	15 km	MPC · JPL
22286	1988 BO_{3}	—	January 18, 1988	La Silla	H. Debehogne	KON	8.4 km	MPC · JPL
22287	1988 RL_{12}	—	September 14, 1988	Cerro Tololo	S. J. Bus	·	6.2 km	MPC · JPL
22288	1988 TR_{2}	—	October 11, 1988	Kleť	A. Mrkos	·	8.2 km	MPC · JPL
22289	1988 XV_{1}	—	December 11, 1988	Kushiro	S. Ueda, H. Kaneda	·	17 km	MPC · JPL
22290	1989 AO	—	January 2, 1989	Palomar	E. F. Helin	PHO	4.8 km	MPC · JPL
22291 Heitifer	1989 CH_{5}	Heitifer	February 2, 1989	Tautenburg Observatory	F. Börngen	URS	14 km	MPC · JPL
22292 Mosul	1989 SM_{1}	Mosul	September 26, 1989	La Silla	E. W. Elst	·	4.4 km	MPC · JPL
22293	1989 SK_{4}	—	September 26, 1989	La Silla	E. W. Elst	·	2.8 km	MPC · JPL
22294 Simmons	1989 SC_{8}	Simmons	September 28, 1989	Palomar	C. S. Shoemaker, E. M. Shoemaker	·	2.8 km	MPC · JPL
22295	1989 SZ_{9}	—	September 26, 1989	La Silla	H. Debehogne	PHO	7.1 km	MPC · JPL
22296	1989 TW_{4}	—	October 7, 1989	La Silla	E. W. Elst	·	2.3 km	MPC · JPL
22297	1989 WA_{1}	—	November 21, 1989	Kani	Y. Mizuno, T. Furuta	·	4.3 km	MPC · JPL
22298	1990 EJ	—	March 2, 1990	Kushiro	S. Ueda, H. Kaneda	·	20 km	MPC · JPL
22299 Georgesteiner	1990 GS	Georgesteiner	April 15, 1990	La Silla	E. W. Elst	·	7.1 km	MPC · JPL
22300	1990 OY	—	July 19, 1990	Palomar	E. F. Helin	·	4.4 km	MPC · JPL

== 22301–22400 ==
back to top

Designation			Discovery			Properties		Ref
Permanent	Provisional	Named after	Date	Site	Discoverer(s)	Category	Diam.	Ref
22301	1990 OB_{1}	—	July 22, 1990	Palomar	E. F. Helin	·	3.5 km	MPC · JPL
22302	1990 OG_{4}	—	July 24, 1990	Palomar	H. E. Holt	·	9.7 km	MPC · JPL
22303	1990 QE_{4}	—	August 23, 1990	Palomar	H. E. Holt	·	8.0 km	MPC · JPL
22304	1990 RU_{9}	—	September 14, 1990	Palomar	H. E. Holt	·	4.3 km	MPC · JPL
22305	1990 SD_{2}	—	September 17, 1990	Palomar	H. E. Holt	·	2.9 km	MPC · JPL
22306	1990 SF_{4}	—	September 23, 1990	Palomar	K. J. Lawrence	·	3.3 km	MPC · JPL
22307	1990 SU_{4}	—	September 16, 1990	Kleť	A. Mrkos	·	6.7 km	MPC · JPL
22308	1990 UO_{4}	—	October 16, 1990	La Silla	E. W. Elst	·	5.8 km	MPC · JPL
22309	1990 VO_{4}	—	November 15, 1990	La Silla	E. W. Elst	·	4.2 km	MPC · JPL
22310	1990 WU_{1}	—	November 18, 1990	La Silla	E. W. Elst	DOR	6.8 km	MPC · JPL
22311	1991 EF_{2}	—	March 10, 1991	La Silla	H. Debehogne	·	3.6 km	MPC · JPL
22312 Kelly	1991 GW_{1}	Kelly	April 14, 1991	Palomar	C. S. Shoemaker, D. H. Levy	PHO	2.7 km	MPC · JPL
22313	1991 GP_{3}	—	April 8, 1991	La Silla	E. W. Elst	·	9.6 km	MPC · JPL
22314	1991 GV_{3}	—	April 8, 1991	La Silla	E. W. Elst	(2076)	3.2 km	MPC · JPL
22315	1991 GA_{4}	—	April 8, 1991	La Silla	E. W. Elst	·	1.9 km	MPC · JPL
22316	1991 LO_{1}	—	June 6, 1991	La Silla	E. W. Elst	·	2.4 km	MPC · JPL
22317	1991 LL_{2}	—	June 6, 1991	La Silla	E. W. Elst	·	9.4 km	MPC · JPL
22318	1991 PG_{1}	—	August 15, 1991	Palomar	E. F. Helin	·	5.0 km	MPC · JPL
22319	1991 PX_{6}	—	August 6, 1991	La Silla	E. W. Elst	MAS	2.3 km	MPC · JPL
22320	1991 PH_{18}	—	August 8, 1991	Palomar	H. E. Holt	PHO	6.0 km	MPC · JPL
22321	1991 RP	—	September 4, 1991	Palomar	E. F. Helin	·	3.6 km	MPC · JPL
22322 Bodensee	1991 RQ_{4}	Bodensee	September 13, 1991	Tautenburg Observatory	F. Börngen, L. D. Schmadel	·	3.5 km	MPC · JPL
22323	1991 RC_{6}	—	September 13, 1991	Palomar	H. E. Holt	·	4.1 km	MPC · JPL
22324	1991 RQ_{9}	—	September 10, 1991	Palomar	H. E. Holt	NYS	3.7 km	MPC · JPL
22325	1991 RE_{19}	—	September 14, 1991	Palomar	H. E. Holt	V	3.1 km	MPC · JPL
22326	1991 SZ	—	September 30, 1991	Siding Spring	R. H. McNaught	·	6.4 km	MPC · JPL
22327	1991 TS	—	October 1, 1991	Siding Spring	R. H. McNaught	·	3.6 km	MPC · JPL
22328	1991 VJ_{1}	—	November 4, 1991	Kiyosato	S. Otomo	·	3.7 km	MPC · JPL
22329	1991 VT_{5}	—	November 2, 1991	La Silla	E. W. Elst	·	3.1 km	MPC · JPL
22330	1991 VU_{5}	—	November 2, 1991	La Silla	E. W. Elst	·	4.0 km	MPC · JPL
22331	1992 AC_{1}	—	January 10, 1992	Dynic	A. Sugie	·	7.0 km	MPC · JPL
22332	1992 DD_{8}	—	February 29, 1992	La Silla	UESAC	·	4.5 km	MPC · JPL
22333	1992 DG_{10}	—	February 29, 1992	La Silla	UESAC	·	2.9 km	MPC · JPL
22334	1992 ES_{6}	—	March 1, 1992	La Silla	UESAC	·	4.7 km	MPC · JPL
22335	1992 ED_{18}	—	March 3, 1992	La Silla	UESAC	·	7.2 km	MPC · JPL
22336	1992 EA_{19}	—	March 1, 1992	La Silla	UESAC	HOF	6.2 km	MPC · JPL
22337	1992 EV_{32}	—	March 2, 1992	La Silla	UESAC	·	3.2 km	MPC · JPL
22338 Janemojo	1992 LE	Janemojo	June 3, 1992	Palomar	C. S. Shoemaker, D. H. Levy	·	8.2 km	MPC · JPL
22339	1992 OL_{3}	—	July 26, 1992	La Silla	E. W. Elst	·	8.2 km	MPC · JPL
22340	1992 OM_{6}	—	July 30, 1992	La Silla	E. W. Elst	·	2.0 km	MPC · JPL
22341 Francispoulenc	1992 PF	Francispoulenc	August 8, 1992	Caussols	E. W. Elst	·	2.9 km	MPC · JPL
22342	1992 RW_{2}	—	September 2, 1992	La Silla	E. W. Elst	·	2.6 km	MPC · JPL
22343	1992 RM_{5}	—	September 2, 1992	La Silla	E. W. Elst	NYS	3.6 km	MPC · JPL
22344	1992 RJ_{7}	—	September 2, 1992	La Silla	E. W. Elst	HYG	8.3 km	MPC · JPL
22345	1992 SP_{2}	—	September 23, 1992	Palomar	E. F. Helin	·	5.8 km	MPC · JPL
22346 Katsumatatakashi	1992 SY_{12}	Katsumatatakashi	September 28, 1992	Kitami	M. Yanai, K. Watanabe	·	3.9 km	MPC · JPL
22347 Mishinatakashi	1992 SE_{13}	Mishinatakashi	September 30, 1992	Kitami	K. Endate, K. Watanabe	NYS	3.5 km	MPC · JPL
22348 Schmeidler	1992 SA_{17}	Schmeidler	September 24, 1992	Tautenburg Observatory	L. D. Schmadel, F. Börngen	·	2.4 km	MPC · JPL
22349	1992 UH	—	October 19, 1992	Kushiro	S. Ueda, H. Kaneda	·	4.5 km	MPC · JPL
22350	1992 US	—	October 21, 1992	Dynic	A. Sugie	·	7.6 km	MPC · JPL
22351 Yamashitatoshiki	1992 UT_{2}	Yamashitatoshiki	October 19, 1992	Kitami	K. Endate, K. Watanabe	BAP	3.9 km	MPC · JPL
22352 Fujiwarakenjiro	1992 UP_{3}	Fujiwarakenjiro	October 26, 1992	Kitami	K. Endate, K. Watanabe	·	5.7 km	MPC · JPL
22353	1992 UA_{6}	—	October 28, 1992	Kushiro	S. Ueda, H. Kaneda	·	5.4 km	MPC · JPL
22354 Sposetti	1992 UR_{8}	Sposetti	October 31, 1992	Tautenburg Observatory	F. Börngen	·	6.0 km	MPC · JPL
22355 Yahabananshozan	1992 WD_{1}	Yahabananshozan	November 16, 1992	Kitami	K. Endate, K. Watanabe	NYS	2.2 km	MPC · JPL
22356 Feyerabend	1992 WS_{6}	Feyerabend	November 19, 1992	Kitt Peak	Spacewatch	·	3.2 km	MPC · JPL
22357	1992 YJ	—	December 22, 1992	Yakiimo	Natori, A., T. Urata	slow	8.5 km	MPC · JPL
22358	1993 FK_{11}	—	March 17, 1993	La Silla	UESAC	·	3.3 km	MPC · JPL
22359	1993 FR_{11}	—	March 17, 1993	La Silla	UESAC	EUN	3.4 km	MPC · JPL
22360	1993 FT_{11}	—	March 17, 1993	La Silla	UESAC	EUN	4.5 km	MPC · JPL
22361	1993 FN_{14}	—	March 17, 1993	La Silla	UESAC	·	2.4 km	MPC · JPL
22362	1993 FY_{19}	—	March 17, 1993	La Silla	UESAC	·	3.2 km	MPC · JPL
22363	1993 FX_{21}	—	March 21, 1993	La Silla	UESAC	·	2.9 km	MPC · JPL
22364	1993 FJ_{33}	—	March 19, 1993	La Silla	UESAC	·	3.4 km	MPC · JPL
22365	1993 FQ_{43}	—	March 19, 1993	La Silla	UESAC	·	3.1 km	MPC · JPL
22366 Flettner	1993 MT	Flettner	June 21, 1993	Kitt Peak	Spacewatch	KOR	3.5 km	MPC · JPL
22367	1993 MZ	—	June 18, 1993	Siding Spring	R. H. McNaught	EUN	4.9 km	MPC · JPL
22368	1993 PV_{3}	—	August 14, 1993	Caussols	E. W. Elst	EOS	6.4 km	MPC · JPL
22369 Klinger	1993 SE_{3}	Klinger	September 18, 1993	Tautenburg Observatory	F. Börngen, L. D. Schmadel	·	2.2 km	MPC · JPL
22370 Italocalvino	1993 TJ_{2}	Italocalvino	October 15, 1993	Bassano Bresciano	Bresciano, Bassano	THM	8.5 km	MPC · JPL
22371	1993 TA_{16}	—	October 9, 1993	La Silla	E. W. Elst	·	7.8 km	MPC · JPL
22372	1993 TD_{28}	—	October 9, 1993	La Silla	E. W. Elst	·	8.4 km	MPC · JPL
22373	1993 TJ_{31}	—	October 9, 1993	La Silla	E. W. Elst	·	8.4 km	MPC · JPL
22374	1993 TX_{33}	—	October 9, 1993	La Silla	E. W. Elst	·	8.7 km	MPC · JPL
22375	1993 TF_{34}	—	October 9, 1993	La Silla	E. W. Elst	·	2.2 km	MPC · JPL
22376	1993 TX_{38}	—	October 9, 1993	La Silla	E. W. Elst	·	7.3 km	MPC · JPL
22377	1993 UW_{6}	—	October 20, 1993	La Silla	E. W. Elst	fast	9.8 km	MPC · JPL
22378 Gaherty	1994 AY_{10}	Gaherty	January 8, 1994	Kitt Peak	Spacewatch	·	4.8 km	MPC · JPL
22379 Montale	1994 CO_{1}	Montale	February 10, 1994	Farra d'Isonzo	Farra d'Isonzo	·	2.4 km	MPC · JPL
22380	1994 CF_{10}	—	February 7, 1994	La Silla	E. W. Elst	·	2.9 km	MPC · JPL
22381	1994 CN_{10}	—	February 7, 1994	La Silla	E. W. Elst	·	2.7 km	MPC · JPL
22382	1994 CY_{16}	—	February 8, 1994	La Silla	E. W. Elst	NYS	3.0 km	MPC · JPL
22383 Nikolauspacassi	1994 EL	Nikolauspacassi	March 5, 1994	Farra d'Isonzo	Farra d'Isonzo	·	2.1 km	MPC · JPL
22384	1994 EZ_{6}	—	March 9, 1994	Caussols	E. W. Elst	·	3.7 km	MPC · JPL
22385 Fujimoriboshi	1994 EK_{7}	Fujimoriboshi	March 14, 1994	Nyukasa	M. Hirasawa, S. Suzuki	·	3.9 km	MPC · JPL
22386	1994 PF_{14}	—	August 10, 1994	La Silla	E. W. Elst	·	5.3 km	MPC · JPL
22387	1994 PN_{14}	—	August 10, 1994	La Silla	E. W. Elst	·	2.7 km	MPC · JPL
22388	1994 PC_{15}	—	August 10, 1994	La Silla	E. W. Elst	EUN	3.3 km	MPC · JPL
22389	1994 PC_{21}	—	August 12, 1994	La Silla	E. W. Elst	PAD	5.5 km	MPC · JPL
22390	1994 PA_{23}	—	August 12, 1994	La Silla	E. W. Elst	·	3.6 km	MPC · JPL
22391	1994 PE_{26}	—	August 12, 1994	La Silla	E. W. Elst	·	4.6 km	MPC · JPL
22392	1994 PT_{27}	—	August 12, 1994	La Silla	E. W. Elst	·	3.8 km	MPC · JPL
22393	1994 QV	—	August 29, 1994	Nachi-Katsuura	Y. Shimizu, T. Urata	·	11 km	MPC · JPL
22394 Kondouakira	1994 TO	Kondouakira	October 2, 1994	Kitami	K. Endate, K. Watanabe	ADE	9.4 km	MPC · JPL
22395 Ourakenji	1994 TD_{3}	Ourakenji	October 2, 1994	Kitami	K. Endate, K. Watanabe	·	5.2 km	MPC · JPL
22396	1994 VR	—	November 3, 1994	Oizumi	T. Kobayashi	·	4.8 km	MPC · JPL
22397 Minobe	1994 VV_{2}	Minobe	November 4, 1994	Kitami	K. Endate, K. Watanabe	GEF	5.7 km	MPC · JPL
22398	1994 WF_{1}	—	November 27, 1994	Oizumi	T. Kobayashi	KOR	5.3 km	MPC · JPL
22399	1995 CB	—	February 1, 1995	Oizumi	T. Kobayashi	·	7.8 km	MPC · JPL
22400	1995 CC	—	February 1, 1995	Oizumi	T. Kobayashi	·	13 km	MPC · JPL

== 22401–22500 ==
back to top

Designation			Discovery			Properties		Ref
Permanent	Provisional	Named after	Date	Site	Discoverer(s)	Category	Diam.	Ref
22401 Egisto	1995 DP_{3}	Egisto	February 24, 1995	Asiago	M. Tombelli	·	15 km	MPC · JPL
22402 Goshi	1995 GN	Goshi	April 3, 1995	Kuma Kogen	A. Nakamura	·	2.1 km	MPC · JPL
22403 Manjitludher	1995 LK	Manjitludher	June 5, 1995	Siding Spring	D. J. Asher	PHO	4.1 km	MPC · JPL
22404 Skujytė	1995 ME_{4}	Skujytė	June 29, 1995	Kitt Peak	Spacewatch	L4	20 km	MPC · JPL
22405 Gavioliremo	1995 OB	Gavioliremo	July 19, 1995	Cavezzo	Cavezzo	(2076)	2.8 km	MPC · JPL
22406 Garyboyle	1995 QW_{5}	Garyboyle	August 22, 1995	Kitt Peak	Spacewatch	·	2.4 km	MPC · JPL
22407	1995 SK_{2}	—	September 17, 1995	Nachi-Katsuura	Y. Shimizu, T. Urata	·	4.7 km	MPC · JPL
22408	1995 SC_{3}	—	September 20, 1995	Kushiro	S. Ueda, H. Kaneda	·	8.2 km	MPC · JPL
22409 Nagatohideaki	1995 SU_{3}	Nagatohideaki	September 20, 1995	Kitami	K. Endate, K. Watanabe	·	4.4 km	MPC · JPL
22410 Grinspoon	1995 SS_{52}	Grinspoon	September 29, 1995	Kitt Peak	Spacewatch	·	2.6 km	MPC · JPL
22411	1995 TR	—	October 2, 1995	Oizumi	T. Kobayashi	V	2.9 km	MPC · JPL
22412	1995 UQ_{4}	—	October 25, 1995	Oizumi	T. Kobayashi	PHO	12 km	MPC · JPL
22413 Haifu	1995 UB_{13}	Haifu	October 17, 1995	Kitt Peak	Spacewatch	·	2.3 km	MPC · JPL
22414 Hornschemeier	1995 UB_{15}	Hornschemeier	October 17, 1995	Kitt Peak	Spacewatch	·	3.0 km	MPC · JPL
22415 Humeivey	1995 UB_{21}	Humeivey	October 19, 1995	Kitt Peak	Spacewatch	·	2.5 km	MPC · JPL
22416 Tanimotoyoshi	1995 UC_{47}	Tanimotoyoshi	October 28, 1995	Kitami	K. Endate, K. Watanabe	(5)	3.9 km	MPC · JPL
22417	1995 WK_{1}	—	November 18, 1995	Oizumi	T. Kobayashi	·	4.9 km	MPC · JPL
22418	1995 WM_{4}	—	November 20, 1995	Oizumi	T. Kobayashi	(5)	5.0 km	MPC · JPL
22419	1995 WP_{5}	—	November 24, 1995	Oizumi	T. Kobayashi	·	6.4 km	MPC · JPL
22420 Xinanlianda	1995 WL_{42}	Xinanlianda	November 28, 1995	Xinglong	SCAP	·	3.7 km	MPC · JPL
22421 Jamesedgar	1995 XC_{5}	Jamesedgar	December 14, 1995	Kitt Peak	Spacewatch	·	3.9 km	MPC · JPL
22422 Kenmount Hill	1995 YO_{5}	Kenmount Hill	December 16, 1995	Kitt Peak	Spacewatch	·	4.1 km	MPC · JPL
22423 Kudlacek	1995 YJ_{12}	Kudlacek	December 19, 1995	Kitt Peak	Spacewatch	MAR	3.1 km	MPC · JPL
22424	1995 YS_{21}	—	December 20, 1995	Haleakala	NEAT	AGN	4.1 km	MPC · JPL
22425	1996 AZ	—	January 11, 1996	Oizumi	T. Kobayashi	·	4.9 km	MPC · JPL
22426 Mikehanes	1996 AH_{9}	Mikehanes	January 13, 1996	Kitt Peak	Spacewatch	·	4.2 km	MPC · JPL
22427	1996 DB	—	February 18, 1996	Oizumi	T. Kobayashi	T_{j} (2.99)	9.8 km	MPC · JPL
22428	1996 DT	—	February 19, 1996	Oizumi	T. Kobayashi	EOS · fast	7.5 km	MPC · JPL
22429 Jurašek	1996 DD_{1}	Jurašek	February 22, 1996	Modra	A. Galád, Pravda, A.	HNS	2.9 km	MPC · JPL
22430	1996 DM_{2}	—	February 23, 1996	Oizumi	T. Kobayashi	NEM ·	6.7 km	MPC · JPL
22431	1996 DY_{2}	—	February 28, 1996	Church Stretton	S. P. Laurie	KOR	5.2 km	MPC · JPL
22432 Pamgriffin	1996 EJ_{14}	Pamgriffin	March 12, 1996	Kitt Peak	Spacewatch	·	6.6 km	MPC · JPL
22433	1996 GC_{2}	—	April 9, 1996	Kiyosato	S. Otomo	·	11 km	MPC · JPL
22434 Peredery	1996 GE_{6}	Peredery	April 11, 1996	Kitt Peak	Spacewatch	·	9.4 km	MPC · JPL
22435 Pierfederici	1996 GN_{7}	Pierfederici	April 12, 1996	Kitt Peak	Spacewatch	·	7.4 km	MPC · JPL
22436	1996 GO_{17}	—	April 15, 1996	La Silla	E. W. Elst	·	10 km	MPC · JPL
22437	1996 GR_{20}	—	April 15, 1996	La Silla	E. W. Elst	·	10 km	MPC · JPL
22438	1996 HQ_{19}	—	April 18, 1996	La Silla	E. W. Elst	·	8.2 km	MPC · JPL
22439	1996 HL_{20}	—	April 18, 1996	La Silla	E. W. Elst	THM · fast	9.1 km	MPC · JPL
22440 Bangsgaard	1996 KA	Bangsgaard	May 17, 1996	Modra	A. Galád, Pravda, A.	·	13 km	MPC · JPL
22441	1996 PA_{9}	—	August 8, 1996	La Silla	E. W. Elst	·	2.4 km	MPC · JPL
22442 Blaha	1996 TM_{9}	Blaha	October 14, 1996	Kleť	J. Tichá, M. Tichý	·	2.0 km	MPC · JPL
22443	1996 TJ_{11}	—	October 11, 1996	Kitami	K. Endate	·	1.6 km	MPC · JPL
22444	1996 TK_{12}	—	October 15, 1996	Nachi-Katsuura	Y. Shimizu, T. Urata	·	2.0 km	MPC · JPL
22445	1996 TT_{14}	—	October 9, 1996	Kushiro	S. Ueda, H. Kaneda	·	3.5 km	MPC · JPL
22446 Philwhitney	1996 TU_{25}	Philwhitney	October 6, 1996	Kitt Peak	Spacewatch	·	2.8 km	MPC · JPL
22447	1996 TP_{34}	—	October 10, 1996	Kitt Peak	Spacewatch	·	3.1 km	MPC · JPL
22448 Ricksaunders	1996 TP_{35}	Ricksaunders	October 11, 1996	Kitt Peak	Spacewatch	·	1.8 km	MPC · JPL
22449 Ottijeff	1996 VC	Ottijeff	November 1, 1996	Catalina Station	T. B. Spahr	·	3.8 km	MPC · JPL
22450 Nové Hrady	1996 VN	Nové Hrady	November 3, 1996	Kleť	J. Tichá, M. Tichý	·	4.0 km	MPC · JPL
22451 Tymothycoons	1996 VN_{6}	Tymothycoons	November 13, 1996	Campo Imperatore	A. Boattini, A. Di Paola	·	4.3 km	MPC · JPL
22452	1996 VD_{8}	—	November 3, 1996	Kushiro	S. Ueda, H. Kaneda	LEO	6.2 km	MPC · JPL
22453 Shibusawaeiichi	1996 VC_{9}	Shibusawaeiichi	November 7, 1996	Kitami	K. Endate, K. Watanabe	·	3.4 km	MPC · JPL
22454 Rosalylopes	1996 VU_{17}	Rosalylopes	November 6, 1996	Kitt Peak	Spacewatch	·	1.8 km	MPC · JPL
22455	1996 XK_{1}	—	December 2, 1996	Oizumi	T. Kobayashi	NYS	1.8 km	MPC · JPL
22456 Salopek	1996 XF_{12}	Salopek	December 4, 1996	Kitt Peak	Spacewatch	·	3.4 km	MPC · JPL
22457	1996 XC_{15}	—	December 10, 1996	Xinglong	SCAP	·	3.6 km	MPC · JPL
22458	1996 XD_{31}	—	December 14, 1996	Oizumi	T. Kobayashi	·	3.4 km	MPC · JPL
22459	1997 AD_{2}	—	January 3, 1997	Oizumi	T. Kobayashi	·	4.7 km	MPC · JPL
22460	1997 AJ_{2}	—	January 3, 1997	Oizumi	T. Kobayashi	·	3.9 km	MPC · JPL
22461	1997 AB_{7}	—	January 9, 1997	Oizumi	T. Kobayashi	·	3.8 km	MPC · JPL
22462	1997 AF_{7}	—	January 9, 1997	Oizumi	T. Kobayashi	·	3.8 km	MPC · JPL
22463	1997 AT_{13}	—	January 11, 1997	Haleakala	NEAT	NYS	2.1 km	MPC · JPL
22464	1997 AG_{14}	—	January 4, 1997	Xinglong	SCAP	·	12 km	MPC · JPL
22465 Karelanděl	1997 AK_{18}	Karelanděl	January 15, 1997	Kleť	M. Tichý, Z. Moravec	·	2.9 km	MPC · JPL
22466	1997 BA_{3}	—	January 30, 1997	Oizumi	T. Kobayashi	NYS	4.0 km	MPC · JPL
22467 Koharumi	1997 BC_{3}	Koharumi	January 30, 1997	Oizumi	T. Kobayashi	V	3.0 km	MPC · JPL
22468	1997 CK_{1}	—	February 1, 1997	Oizumi	T. Kobayashi	·	3.2 km	MPC · JPL
22469 Poloniny	1997 CP_{1}	Poloniny	February 2, 1997	Modra	L. Kornoš, P. Kolény	·	2.4 km	MPC · JPL
22470 Shirakawa-go	1997 CR_{21}	Shirakawa-go	February 9, 1997	Chichibu	N. Satō	MAS	2.2 km	MPC · JPL
22471	1997 CR_{28}	—	February 2, 1997	Xinglong	SCAP	·	2.9 km	MPC · JPL
22472	1997 CT_{28}	—	February 6, 1997	Xinglong	SCAP	·	2.7 km	MPC · JPL
22473 Stanleyhey	1997 EN_{4}	Stanleyhey	March 2, 1997	Kitt Peak	Spacewatch	ADE	6.7 km	MPC · JPL
22474 Frobenius	1997 ED_{8}	Frobenius	March 8, 1997	Prescott	P. G. Comba	·	2.7 km	MPC · JPL
22475 Stanrunge	1997 EH_{13}	Stanrunge	March 3, 1997	Kitt Peak	Spacewatch	fast	3.9 km	MPC · JPL
22476	1997 EM_{23}	—	March 8, 1997	Xinglong	SCAP	EUN	10 km	MPC · JPL
22477 Julimacoraor	1997 EU_{42}	Julimacoraor	March 10, 1997	Socorro	LINEAR	·	3.3 km	MPC · JPL
22478	1997 EM_{48}	—	March 11, 1997	La Silla	E. W. Elst	·	2.7 km	MPC · JPL
22479	1997 FY_{1}	—	March 29, 1997	Xinglong	SCAP	EUN	4.7 km	MPC · JPL
22480 Maedatoshihisa	1997 GU_{3}	Maedatoshihisa	April 3, 1997	Kitami	K. Endate, K. Watanabe	·	4.8 km	MPC · JPL
22481 Zachlynn	1997 GM_{13}	Zachlynn	April 3, 1997	Socorro	LINEAR	·	9.2 km	MPC · JPL
22482 Michbertier	1997 GK_{16}	Michbertier	April 3, 1997	Socorro	LINEAR	·	6.7 km	MPC · JPL
22483	1997 GX_{16}	—	April 3, 1997	Socorro	LINEAR	·	4.0 km	MPC · JPL
22484	1997 GX_{21}	—	April 6, 1997	Socorro	LINEAR	KOR	6.0 km	MPC · JPL
22485 Unterman	1997 GS_{22}	Unterman	April 6, 1997	Socorro	LINEAR	·	3.9 km	MPC · JPL
22486	1997 GZ_{22}	—	April 6, 1997	Socorro	LINEAR	·	3.3 km	MPC · JPL
22487 Megphillips	1997 GP_{23}	Megphillips	April 6, 1997	Socorro	LINEAR	MRX	3.6 km	MPC · JPL
22488 Martyschwartz	1997 GP_{24}	Martyschwartz	April 7, 1997	Socorro	LINEAR	EOS	4.5 km	MPC · JPL
22489 Yanaka	1997 GR_{24}	Yanaka	April 7, 1997	Kuma Kogen	A. Nakamura	EUN	5.7 km	MPC · JPL
22490 Zigamiyama	1997 GB_{26}	Zigamiyama	April 11, 1997	Nanyo	T. Okuni	·	3.9 km	MPC · JPL
22491	1997 GX_{32}	—	April 3, 1997	Socorro	LINEAR	·	5.1 km	MPC · JPL
22492 Mosig	1997 GN_{35}	Mosig	April 6, 1997	Socorro	LINEAR	KOR	3.4 km	MPC · JPL
22493	1997 GP_{40}	—	April 7, 1997	La Silla	E. W. Elst	·	6.3 km	MPC · JPL
22494 Trillium	1997 JL	Trillium	May 2, 1997	Kitt Peak	Spacewatch	·	3.6 km	MPC · JPL
22495 Fubini	1997 JU_{3}	Fubini	May 6, 1997	Prescott	P. G. Comba	·	5.1 km	MPC · JPL
22496	1997 JH_{13}	—	May 3, 1997	La Silla	E. W. Elst	·	3.5 km	MPC · JPL
22497 Immanuelfuchs	1997 KG	Immanuelfuchs	May 30, 1997	Prescott	P. G. Comba	KOR	4.1 km	MPC · JPL
22498 Willman	1997 LY_{2}	Willman	June 5, 1997	Kitt Peak	Spacewatch	·	8.5 km	MPC · JPL
22499 Wunibaldkamm	1997 MP_{9}	Wunibaldkamm	June 27, 1997	Kitt Peak	Spacewatch	EOS	5.5 km	MPC · JPL
22500 Grazianoventre	1997 OJ	Grazianoventre	July 26, 1997	Sormano	P. Sicoli, A. Testa	THM	10 km	MPC · JPL

== 22501–22600 ==
back to top

Designation			Discovery			Properties		Ref
Permanent	Provisional	Named after	Date	Site	Discoverer(s)	Category	Diam.	Ref
22501	1997 PR_{3}	—	August 5, 1997	Xinglong	SCAP	·	2.7 km	MPC · JPL
22502	1997 SW	—	September 16, 1997	Xinglong	SCAP	·	2.6 km	MPC · JPL
22503 Thalpius	1997 TB_{12}	Thalpius	October 7, 1997	Kleť	M. Tichý, Z. Moravec	L4	16 km	MPC · JPL
22504	1997 TD_{17}	—	October 6, 1997	Nachi-Katsuura	Y. Shimizu, T. Urata	·	2.8 km	MPC · JPL
22505 Lewit	1997 UF	Lewit	October 19, 1997	Ondřejov	L. Kotková	·	2.4 km	MPC · JPL
22506	1997 WD_{8}	—	November 24, 1997	Oizumi	T. Kobayashi	·	3.7 km	MPC · JPL
22507	1997 WA_{31}	—	November 29, 1997	Socorro	LINEAR	NYS	3.9 km	MPC · JPL
22508	1997 WZ_{42}	—	November 29, 1997	Socorro	LINEAR	THM	7.0 km	MPC · JPL
22509	1997 YY_{2}	—	December 24, 1997	Oizumi	T. Kobayashi	·	3.3 km	MPC · JPL
22510	1997 YV_{7}	—	December 21, 1997	Kitt Peak	Spacewatch	·	2.2 km	MPC · JPL
22511	1997 YC_{10}	—	December 28, 1997	Oizumi	T. Kobayashi	(5)	3.0 km	MPC · JPL
22512 Cannat	1998 BH_{26}	Cannat	January 28, 1998	Caussols	ODAS	fast	4.4 km	MPC · JPL
22513	1998 BX_{32}	—	January 29, 1998	Caussols	ODAS	·	2.1 km	MPC · JPL
22514	1998 DN_{5}	—	February 22, 1998	Haleakala	NEAT	·	7.2 km	MPC · JPL
22515	1998 DJ_{15}	—	February 22, 1998	Haleakala	NEAT	V	2.4 km	MPC · JPL
22516	1998 DN_{28}	—	February 26, 1998	Kitt Peak	Spacewatch	·	4.1 km	MPC · JPL
22517 Alexzanardi	1998 DX_{32}	Alexzanardi	February 26, 1998	Cima Ekar	M. Tombelli, G. Forti	·	3.3 km	MPC · JPL
22518	1998 DG_{34}	—	February 27, 1998	La Silla	E. W. Elst	·	4.9 km	MPC · JPL
22519 Gerardklein	1998 EC_{2}	Gerardklein	March 2, 1998	Caussols	ODAS	·	2.8 km	MPC · JPL
22520	1998 EL_{2}	—	March 2, 1998	Caussols	ODAS	·	2.6 km	MPC · JPL
22521 ZZ Top	1998 ER_{2}	ZZ Top	March 2, 1998	Caussols	ODAS	V	1.3 km	MPC · JPL
22522	1998 EF_{6}	—	March 2, 1998	Nachi-Katsuura	Y. Shimizu, T. Urata	PHO	3.3 km	MPC · JPL
22523	1998 EZ_{10}	—	March 1, 1998	La Silla	E. W. Elst	·	3.5 km	MPC · JPL
22524	1998 FB_{6}	—	March 18, 1998	Kitt Peak	Spacewatch	fast	2.0 km	MPC · JPL
22525	1998 FB_{12}	—	March 24, 1998	Haleakala	NEAT	·	2.8 km	MPC · JPL
22526 Gonzálezsuárez	1998 FV_{15}	Gonzálezsuárez	March 22, 1998	Majorca	Á. López J., R. Pacheco	·	2.8 km	MPC · JPL
22527 Gawlik	1998 FG_{20}	Gawlik	March 20, 1998	Socorro	LINEAR	·	2.8 km	MPC · JPL
22528 Elysehope	1998 FH_{34}	Elysehope	March 20, 1998	Socorro	LINEAR	·	1.3 km	MPC · JPL
22529	1998 FB_{40}	—	March 20, 1998	Socorro	LINEAR	EOS	4.6 km	MPC · JPL
22530 Huynh-Le	1998 FY_{41}	Huynh-Le	March 20, 1998	Socorro	LINEAR	(2076)	2.8 km	MPC · JPL
22531 Davidkelley	1998 FN_{43}	Davidkelley	March 20, 1998	Socorro	LINEAR	·	2.3 km	MPC · JPL
22532	1998 FG_{45}	—	March 20, 1998	Socorro	LINEAR	·	2.7 km	MPC · JPL
22533 Krishnan	1998 FX_{47}	Krishnan	March 20, 1998	Socorro	LINEAR	·	4.9 km	MPC · JPL
22534 Lieblich	1998 FF_{57}	Lieblich	March 20, 1998	Socorro	LINEAR	·	2.1 km	MPC · JPL
22535	1998 FH_{60}	—	March 20, 1998	Socorro	LINEAR	·	2.4 km	MPC · JPL
22536 Katelowry	1998 FY_{61}	Katelowry	March 20, 1998	Socorro	LINEAR	·	6.2 km	MPC · JPL
22537 Meyerowitz	1998 FB_{62}	Meyerowitz	March 20, 1998	Socorro	LINEAR	PAD	8.1 km	MPC · JPL
22538 Lucasmoller	1998 FS_{63}	Lucasmoller	March 20, 1998	Socorro	LINEAR	·	2.4 km	MPC · JPL
22539	1998 FT_{65}	—	March 20, 1998	Socorro	LINEAR	·	2.9 km	MPC · JPL
22540 Mork	1998 FZ_{67}	Mork	March 20, 1998	Socorro	LINEAR	KOR	3.6 km	MPC · JPL
22541	1998 FC_{68}	—	March 20, 1998	Socorro	LINEAR	·	2.6 km	MPC · JPL
22542 Pendri	1998 FG_{71}	Pendri	March 20, 1998	Socorro	LINEAR	·	2.2 km	MPC · JPL
22543 Ranjan	1998 FA_{75}	Ranjan	March 24, 1998	Socorro	LINEAR	·	1.5 km	MPC · JPL
22544 Sarahrapo	1998 FL_{75}	Sarahrapo	March 24, 1998	Socorro	LINEAR	·	2.2 km	MPC · JPL
22545 Brittrusso	1998 FP_{77}	Brittrusso	March 24, 1998	Socorro	LINEAR	·	2.5 km	MPC · JPL
22546 Schickler	1998 FK_{78}	Schickler	March 24, 1998	Socorro	LINEAR	·	2.1 km	MPC · JPL
22547 Kimberscott	1998 FO_{78}	Kimberscott	March 24, 1998	Socorro	LINEAR	·	3.7 km	MPC · JPL
22548	1998 FV_{90}	—	March 24, 1998	Socorro	LINEAR	·	3.3 km	MPC · JPL
22549	1998 FQ_{94}	—	March 24, 1998	Socorro	LINEAR	EOS	5.6 km	MPC · JPL
22550 Jonsellon	1998 FK_{106}	Jonsellon	March 31, 1998	Socorro	LINEAR	·	3.9 km	MPC · JPL
22551 Adamsolomon	1998 FU_{110}	Adamsolomon	March 31, 1998	Socorro	LINEAR	·	1.6 km	MPC · JPL
22552	1998 FN_{112}	—	March 31, 1998	Socorro	LINEAR	EOS	6.2 km	MPC · JPL
22553 Yisun	1998 FS_{116}	Yisun	March 31, 1998	Socorro	LINEAR	V	2.2 km	MPC · JPL
22554 Shoshanatell	1998 FC_{118}	Shoshanatell	March 31, 1998	Socorro	LINEAR	·	3.5 km	MPC · JPL
22555 Joevellone	1998 FU_{118}	Joevellone	March 31, 1998	Socorro	LINEAR	·	2.4 km	MPC · JPL
22556	1998 FU_{120}	—	March 20, 1998	Socorro	LINEAR	·	3.4 km	MPC · JPL
22557	1998 FF_{140}	—	March 29, 1998	Socorro	LINEAR	·	3.0 km	MPC · JPL
22558 Mladen	1998 HH_{3}	Mladen	April 22, 1998	Modra	L. Kornoš, P. Kolény	·	1.7 km	MPC · JPL
22559	1998 HQ_{12}	—	April 19, 1998	Kitt Peak	Spacewatch	PHO	3.1 km	MPC · JPL
22560	1998 HD_{17}	—	April 18, 1998	Socorro	LINEAR	·	5.7 km	MPC · JPL
22561 Miviscardi	1998 HX_{18}	Miviscardi	April 18, 1998	Socorro	LINEAR	·	2.2 km	MPC · JPL
22562 Wage	1998 HC_{19}	Wage	April 18, 1998	Socorro	LINEAR	·	5.8 km	MPC · JPL
22563 Xinwang	1998 HQ_{19}	Xinwang	April 18, 1998	Socorro	LINEAR	·	3.0 km	MPC · JPL
22564 Jeffreyxing	1998 HP_{29}	Jeffreyxing	April 20, 1998	Socorro	LINEAR	·	2.1 km	MPC · JPL
22565	1998 HF_{30}	—	April 20, 1998	Socorro	LINEAR	NYS	2.0 km	MPC · JPL
22566 Irazaitseva	1998 HY_{31}	Irazaitseva	April 20, 1998	Socorro	LINEAR	·	2.2 km	MPC · JPL
22567 Zenisek	1998 HK_{33}	Zenisek	April 20, 1998	Socorro	LINEAR	V	2.1 km	MPC · JPL
22568	1998 HR_{34}	—	April 20, 1998	Socorro	LINEAR	NYS	3.9 km	MPC · JPL
22569	1998 HK_{36}	—	April 20, 1998	Socorro	LINEAR	moon	3.8 km	MPC · JPL
22570 Harleyzhang	1998 HN_{38}	Harleyzhang	April 20, 1998	Socorro	LINEAR	·	4.0 km	MPC · JPL
22571 Letianzhang	1998 HA_{39}	Letianzhang	April 20, 1998	Socorro	LINEAR	·	3.1 km	MPC · JPL
22572 Yuanzhang	1998 HJ_{39}	Yuanzhang	April 20, 1998	Socorro	LINEAR	·	2.0 km	MPC · JPL
22573 Johnzhou	1998 HY_{43}	Johnzhou	April 20, 1998	Socorro	LINEAR	·	1.9 km	MPC · JPL
22574	1998 HW_{44}	—	April 20, 1998	Socorro	LINEAR	·	3.8 km	MPC · JPL
22575 Jayallen	1998 HC_{46}	Jayallen	April 20, 1998	Socorro	LINEAR	·	4.0 km	MPC · JPL
22576	1998 HN_{46}	—	April 20, 1998	Socorro	LINEAR	·	3.7 km	MPC · JPL
22577 Alfiuccio	1998 HT_{51}	Alfiuccio	April 30, 1998	Anderson Mesa	LONEOS	·	3.0 km	MPC · JPL
22578	1998 HE_{59}	—	April 21, 1998	Socorro	LINEAR	·	4.9 km	MPC · JPL
22579 Marcyeager	1998 HO_{62}	Marcyeager	April 21, 1998	Socorro	LINEAR	·	3.2 km	MPC · JPL
22580 Kenkaplan	1998 HB_{67}	Kenkaplan	April 21, 1998	Socorro	LINEAR	·	3.7 km	MPC · JPL
22581 Rosahemphill	1998 HH_{77}	Rosahemphill	April 21, 1998	Socorro	LINEAR	MAS	2.7 km	MPC · JPL
22582 Patmiller	1998 HD_{82}	Patmiller	April 21, 1998	Socorro	LINEAR	NYS ·	3.9 km	MPC · JPL
22583 Metzler	1998 HL_{86}	Metzler	April 21, 1998	Socorro	LINEAR	·	3.2 km	MPC · JPL
22584 Winigleason	1998 HP_{88}	Winigleason	April 21, 1998	Socorro	LINEAR	·	2.7 km	MPC · JPL
22585	1998 HM_{92}	—	April 21, 1998	Socorro	LINEAR	MAR	3.1 km	MPC · JPL
22586 Shellyhynes	1998 HC_{96}	Shellyhynes	April 21, 1998	Socorro	LINEAR	·	2.8 km	MPC · JPL
22587 McKennon	1998 HB_{99}	McKennon	April 21, 1998	Socorro	LINEAR	V	1.5 km	MPC · JPL
22588	1998 HW_{99}	—	April 21, 1998	Socorro	LINEAR	EUN	3.6 km	MPC · JPL
22589 Minor	1998 HY_{100}	Minor	April 21, 1998	Socorro	LINEAR	·	2.3 km	MPC · JPL
22590	1998 HJ_{102}	—	April 25, 1998	La Silla	E. W. Elst	·	2.4 km	MPC · JPL
22591	1998 HO_{102}	—	April 25, 1998	La Silla	E. W. Elst	·	2.8 km	MPC · JPL
22592	1998 HD_{103}	—	April 25, 1998	La Silla	E. W. Elst	·	6.8 km	MPC · JPL
22593	1998 HH_{107}	—	April 23, 1998	Socorro	LINEAR	·	4.8 km	MPC · JPL
22594 Stoops	1998 HT_{107}	Stoops	April 23, 1998	Socorro	LINEAR	·	2.5 km	MPC · JPL
22595	1998 HD_{110}	—	April 23, 1998	Socorro	LINEAR	EOS	7.1 km	MPC · JPL
22596 Kathwallace	1998 HB_{114}	Kathwallace	April 23, 1998	Socorro	LINEAR	·	2.3 km	MPC · JPL
22597 Lynzielinski	1998 HM_{117}	Lynzielinski	April 23, 1998	Socorro	LINEAR	·	2.5 km	MPC · JPL
22598 Francespearl	1998 HO_{117}	Francespearl	April 23, 1998	Socorro	LINEAR	·	3.5 km	MPC · JPL
22599 Heatherhall	1998 HR_{122}	Heatherhall	April 23, 1998	Socorro	LINEAR	·	2.9 km	MPC · JPL
22600	1998 HH_{123}	—	April 23, 1998	Socorro	LINEAR	·	6.3 km	MPC · JPL

== 22601–22700 ==
back to top

Designation			Discovery			Properties		Ref
Permanent	Provisional	Named after	Date	Site	Discoverer(s)	Category	Diam.	Ref
22601	1998 HD_{124}	—	April 23, 1998	Socorro	LINEAR	·	6.5 km	MPC · JPL
22602	1998 HX_{124}	—	April 23, 1998	Socorro	LINEAR	·	3.1 km	MPC · JPL
22603 Davidoconnor	1998 HK_{133}	Davidoconnor	April 19, 1998	Socorro	LINEAR	·	3.5 km	MPC · JPL
22604	1998 HG_{138}	—	April 21, 1998	Socorro	LINEAR	·	5.5 km	MPC · JPL
22605 Steverumsey	1998 HH_{147}	Steverumsey	April 23, 1998	Socorro	LINEAR	·	2.3 km	MPC · JPL
22606	1998 HK_{148}	—	April 25, 1998	La Silla	E. W. Elst	·	5.4 km	MPC · JPL
22607	1998 HD_{149}	—	April 25, 1998	La Silla	E. W. Elst	·	4.8 km	MPC · JPL
22608	1998 JP_{1}	—	May 1, 1998	Haleakala	NEAT	·	3.6 km	MPC · JPL
22609	1998 JT_{1}	—	May 1, 1998	Haleakala	NEAT	NYS	3.4 km	MPC · JPL
22610	1998 JK_{4}	—	May 6, 1998	Višnjan Observatory	Višnjan	·	2.9 km	MPC · JPL
22611 Galerkin	1998 KB	Galerkin	May 17, 1998	Prescott	P. G. Comba	·	2.5 km	MPC · JPL
22612 Dandibner	1998 KT_{3}	Dandibner	May 22, 1998	Anderson Mesa	LONEOS	·	4.5 km	MPC · JPL
22613 Callander	1998 KP_{4}	Callander	May 22, 1998	Anderson Mesa	LONEOS	·	3.6 km	MPC · JPL
22614	1998 KA_{6}	—	May 24, 1998	Kitt Peak	Spacewatch	·	6.9 km	MPC · JPL
22615	1998 KB_{6}	—	May 24, 1998	Kitt Peak	Spacewatch	·	4.5 km	MPC · JPL
22616 Bogolyubov	1998 KG_{7}	Bogolyubov	May 23, 1998	Anderson Mesa	LONEOS	NYS	3.4 km	MPC · JPL
22617 Vidphananu	1998 KH_{7}	Vidphananu	May 23, 1998	Anderson Mesa	LONEOS	·	2.0 km	MPC · JPL
22618 Silva Nortica	1998 KK_{9}	Silva Nortica	May 28, 1998	Kleť	M. Tichý	·	3.1 km	MPC · JPL
22619 Ajscheetz	1998 KJ_{10}	Ajscheetz	May 22, 1998	Socorro	LINEAR	·	3.0 km	MPC · JPL
22620	1998 KZ_{26}	—	May 23, 1998	Woomera	F. B. Zoltowski	·	3.0 km	MPC · JPL
22621 Larrybartel	1998 KO_{28}	Larrybartel	May 22, 1998	Socorro	LINEAR	·	4.7 km	MPC · JPL
22622 Strong	1998 KV_{32}	Strong	May 22, 1998	Socorro	LINEAR	·	4.6 km	MPC · JPL
22623 Fisico	1998 KR_{34}	Fisico	May 22, 1998	Socorro	LINEAR	·	2.8 km	MPC · JPL
22624	1998 KS_{34}	—	May 22, 1998	Socorro	LINEAR	EOS	6.2 km	MPC · JPL
22625 Kanipe	1998 KB_{36}	Kanipe	May 22, 1998	Socorro	LINEAR	·	2.9 km	MPC · JPL
22626 Jengordinier	1998 KS_{37}	Jengordinier	May 22, 1998	Socorro	LINEAR	·	2.7 km	MPC · JPL
22627 Aviscardi	1998 KM_{39}	Aviscardi	May 22, 1998	Socorro	LINEAR	·	2.7 km	MPC · JPL
22628 Michaelallen	1998 KV_{39}	Michaelallen	May 22, 1998	Socorro	LINEAR	NYS ·	5.6 km	MPC · JPL
22629	1998 KF_{40}	—	May 22, 1998	Socorro	LINEAR	EUN	6.8 km	MPC · JPL
22630 Wallmuth	1998 KH_{45}	Wallmuth	May 22, 1998	Socorro	LINEAR	NYS	5.5 km	MPC · JPL
22631 Dillard	1998 KV_{47}	Dillard	May 22, 1998	Socorro	LINEAR	·	3.1 km	MPC · JPL
22632 DiNovis	1998 KG_{64}	DiNovis	May 22, 1998	Socorro	LINEAR	·	3.6 km	MPC · JPL
22633 Fazio	1998 KK_{64}	Fazio	May 22, 1998	Socorro	LINEAR	NYS	4.3 km	MPC · JPL
22634	1998 MN_{7}	—	June 22, 1998	Woomera	F. B. Zoltowski	THM	6.5 km	MPC · JPL
22635	1998 MZ_{11}	—	June 19, 1998	Socorro	LINEAR	EUN	5.7 km	MPC · JPL
22636	1998 MV_{13}	—	June 25, 1998	Woomera	F. B. Zoltowski	HNS	4.5 km	MPC · JPL
22637	1998 MR_{22}	—	June 24, 1998	Socorro	LINEAR	EUN	5.4 km	MPC · JPL
22638 Abdulla	1998 MS_{31}	Abdulla	June 24, 1998	Socorro	LINEAR	·	4.8 km	MPC · JPL
22639 Nickanthony	1998 MP_{32}	Nickanthony	June 24, 1998	Socorro	LINEAR	·	2.7 km	MPC · JPL
22640 Shalilabaena	1998 MJ_{34}	Shalilabaena	June 24, 1998	Socorro	LINEAR	V	2.5 km	MPC · JPL
22641	1998 MX_{34}	—	June 24, 1998	Socorro	LINEAR	EUN	3.9 km	MPC · JPL
22642	1998 NV	—	July 15, 1998	Kitt Peak	Spacewatch	·	4.7 km	MPC · JPL
22643	1998 OB_{3}	—	July 20, 1998	Caussols	ODAS	·	4.6 km	MPC · JPL
22644 Matejbel	1998 OZ_{4}	Matejbel	July 27, 1998	Ondřejov	P. Pravec, U. Babiaková	·	7.1 km	MPC · JPL
22645 Rotblat	1998 OT_{6}	Rotblat	July 26, 1998	Anderson Mesa	LONEOS	NYS	4.4 km	MPC · JPL
22646	1998 OB_{8}	—	July 26, 1998	La Silla	E. W. Elst	·	4.7 km	MPC · JPL
22647 Lévi-Strauss	1998 OR_{8}	Lévi-Strauss	July 26, 1998	La Silla	E. W. Elst	3:2 · SHU	13 km	MPC · JPL
22648	1998 OG_{9}	—	July 26, 1998	La Silla	E. W. Elst	·	4.5 km	MPC · JPL
22649 Paulineloader	1998 OD_{12}	Paulineloader	July 27, 1998	Reedy Creek	J. Broughton	V	3.0 km	MPC · JPL
22650 Brianloader	1998 OG_{12}	Brianloader	July 29, 1998	Reedy Creek	J. Broughton	·	9.2 km	MPC · JPL
22651	1998 QW	—	August 19, 1998	Haleakala	NEAT	MAR	7.0 km	MPC · JPL
22652	1998 QV_{1}	—	August 19, 1998	Haleakala	NEAT	HYG ·	9.3 km	MPC · JPL
22653	1998 QW_{2}	—	August 17, 1998	Socorro	LINEAR	T_{j} (2.89)	7.5 km	MPC · JPL
22654	1998 QA_{5}	—	August 22, 1998	Xinglong	SCAP	·	4.3 km	MPC · JPL
22655	1998 QC_{7}	—	August 17, 1998	Socorro	LINEAR	EOS · fast	7.8 km	MPC · JPL
22656 Aaronburrows	1998 QV_{7}	Aaronburrows	August 17, 1998	Socorro	LINEAR	NYS	4.2 km	MPC · JPL
22657	1998 QN_{8}	—	August 17, 1998	Socorro	LINEAR	·	6.0 km	MPC · JPL
22658	1998 QQ_{8}	—	August 17, 1998	Socorro	LINEAR	·	4.5 km	MPC · JPL
22659	1998 QW_{11}	—	August 17, 1998	Socorro	LINEAR	EOS	4.5 km	MPC · JPL
22660	1998 QB_{16}	—	August 17, 1998	Socorro	LINEAR	EOS	6.6 km	MPC · JPL
22661	1998 QP_{17}	—	August 17, 1998	Socorro	LINEAR	·	3.3 km	MPC · JPL
22662	1998 QL_{18}	—	August 17, 1998	Socorro	LINEAR	HYG	8.1 km	MPC · JPL
22663	1998 QV_{19}	—	August 17, 1998	Socorro	LINEAR	·	4.5 km	MPC · JPL
22664	1998 QY_{22}	—	August 17, 1998	Socorro	LINEAR	HYG	10 km	MPC · JPL
22665	1998 QL_{23}	—	August 17, 1998	Socorro	LINEAR	·	9.2 km	MPC · JPL
22666 Josephchurch	1998 QE_{24}	Josephchurch	August 17, 1998	Socorro	LINEAR	V	3.4 km	MPC · JPL
22667	1998 QA_{26}	—	August 25, 1998	Višnjan Observatory	Višnjan	·	6.3 km	MPC · JPL
22668	1998 QF_{26}	—	August 26, 1998	Višnjan Observatory	Višnjan	·	4.7 km	MPC · JPL
22669	1998 QX_{32}	—	August 17, 1998	Socorro	LINEAR	·	5.1 km	MPC · JPL
22670	1998 QO_{35}	—	August 17, 1998	Socorro	LINEAR	·	5.1 km	MPC · JPL
22671	1998 QL_{36}	—	August 17, 1998	Socorro	LINEAR	HOF	10 km	MPC · JPL
22672	1998 QV_{37}	—	August 17, 1998	Socorro	LINEAR	·	7.8 km	MPC · JPL
22673	1998 QR_{38}	—	August 17, 1998	Socorro	LINEAR	·	17 km	MPC · JPL
22674	1998 QF_{39}	—	August 17, 1998	Socorro	LINEAR	·	9.3 km	MPC · JPL
22675 Davidcohn	1998 QZ_{39}	Davidcohn	August 17, 1998	Socorro	LINEAR	·	4.2 km	MPC · JPL
22676	1998 QS_{41}	—	August 17, 1998	Socorro	LINEAR	·	4.1 km	MPC · JPL
22677	1998 QY_{41}	—	August 17, 1998	Socorro	LINEAR	EOS	5.4 km	MPC · JPL
22678	1998 QB_{42}	—	August 17, 1998	Socorro	LINEAR	VER	6.9 km	MPC · JPL
22679 Amydavid	1998 QJ_{42}	Amydavid	August 17, 1998	Socorro	LINEAR	·	3.4 km	MPC · JPL
22680	1998 QB_{44}	—	August 17, 1998	Socorro	LINEAR	EOS	9.2 km	MPC · JPL
22681	1998 QL_{44}	—	August 17, 1998	Socorro	LINEAR	KOR	4.6 km	MPC · JPL
22682	1998 QU_{47}	—	August 17, 1998	Socorro	LINEAR	KOR	5.7 km	MPC · JPL
22683	1998 QB_{48}	—	August 17, 1998	Socorro	LINEAR	·	4.5 km	MPC · JPL
22684	1998 QO_{50}	—	August 17, 1998	Socorro	LINEAR	EOS	6.8 km	MPC · JPL
22685 Dominguez	1998 QL_{51}	Dominguez	August 17, 1998	Socorro	LINEAR	AGN	4.1 km	MPC · JPL
22686 Mishchenko	1998 QL_{53}	Mishchenko	August 20, 1998	Anderson Mesa	LONEOS	EUN	4.6 km	MPC · JPL
22687	1998 QJ_{64}	—	August 24, 1998	Socorro	LINEAR	MAR	4.4 km	MPC · JPL
22688	1998 QB_{77}	—	August 24, 1998	Socorro	LINEAR	EUN	4.2 km	MPC · JPL
22689	1998 QQ_{84}	—	August 24, 1998	Socorro	LINEAR	·	8.8 km	MPC · JPL
22690	1998 QU_{96}	—	August 19, 1998	Socorro	LINEAR	·	5.6 km	MPC · JPL
22691	1998 QD_{99}	—	August 26, 1998	La Silla	E. W. Elst	KOR	6.9 km	MPC · JPL
22692 Carfrekahl	1998 QE_{99}	Carfrekahl	August 26, 1998	La Silla	E. W. Elst	CYB	9.8 km	MPC · JPL
22693	1998 QF_{102}	—	August 26, 1998	La Silla	E. W. Elst	·	5.5 km	MPC · JPL
22694 Tyndall	1998 QF_{104}	Tyndall	August 26, 1998	La Silla	E. W. Elst	MAR	6.4 km	MPC · JPL
22695	1998 QQ_{104}	—	August 26, 1998	La Silla	E. W. Elst	·	7.7 km	MPC · JPL
22696	1998 QT_{105}	—	August 25, 1998	La Silla	E. W. Elst	V	3.0 km	MPC · JPL
22697 Mánek	1998 RM	Mánek	September 7, 1998	Ondřejov	L. Kotková	WAT	8.0 km	MPC · JPL
22698	1998 RA_{5}	—	September 10, 1998	Višnjan Observatory	Višnjan	·	8.6 km	MPC · JPL
22699	1998 RU_{22}	—	September 14, 1998	Socorro	LINEAR	3:2 · SHU	12 km	MPC · JPL
22700	1998 RP_{37}	—	September 14, 1998	Socorro	LINEAR	·	14 km	MPC · JPL

== 22701–22800 ==
back to top

Designation			Discovery			Properties		Ref
Permanent	Provisional	Named after	Date	Site	Discoverer(s)	Category	Diam.	Ref
22701 Cyannaskye	1998 RO_{38}	Cyannaskye	September 14, 1998	Socorro	LINEAR	·	2.7 km	MPC · JPL
22702	1998 RO_{40}	—	September 14, 1998	Socorro	LINEAR	·	12 km	MPC · JPL
22703	1998 RO_{44}	—	September 14, 1998	Socorro	LINEAR	HYG	13 km	MPC · JPL
22704	1998 RZ_{52}	—	September 14, 1998	Socorro	LINEAR	·	11 km	MPC · JPL
22705 Erinedwards	1998 RF_{53}	Erinedwards	September 14, 1998	Socorro	LINEAR	KOR	5.8 km	MPC · JPL
22706 Ganguly	1998 RT_{56}	Ganguly	September 14, 1998	Socorro	LINEAR	(5)	3.5 km	MPC · JPL
22707 Jackgrundy	1998 RN_{62}	Jackgrundy	September 14, 1998	Socorro	LINEAR	·	7.9 km	MPC · JPL
22708	1998 RK_{66}	—	September 14, 1998	Socorro	LINEAR	·	5.7 km	MPC · JPL
22709	1998 RR_{73}	—	September 14, 1998	Socorro	LINEAR	EUN	5.1 km	MPC · JPL
22710	1998 RF_{75}	—	September 14, 1998	Socorro	LINEAR	·	6.5 km	MPC · JPL
22711	1998 RZ_{75}	—	September 14, 1998	Socorro	LINEAR	EOS	7.0 km	MPC · JPL
22712	1998 RF_{78}	—	September 14, 1998	Socorro	LINEAR	slow	10 km	MPC · JPL
22713	1998 RK_{79}	—	September 14, 1998	Socorro	LINEAR	·	10 km	MPC · JPL
22714	1998 SR_{2}	—	September 18, 1998	Catalina	CSS	T_{j} (2.99)	16 km	MPC · JPL
22715	1998 SQ_{6}	—	September 20, 1998	Kitt Peak	Spacewatch	KOR	4.0 km	MPC · JPL
22716	1998 SV_{9}	—	September 16, 1998	Višnjan Observatory	Višnjan	THM	11 km	MPC · JPL
22717 Romeuf	1998 SF_{13}	Romeuf	September 21, 1998	Caussols	ODAS	·	10 km	MPC · JPL
22718	1998 SY_{15}	—	September 16, 1998	Kitt Peak	Spacewatch	·	10 km	MPC · JPL
22719 Nakadori	1998 SH_{25}	Nakadori	September 22, 1998	Anderson Mesa	LONEOS	PAD	13 km	MPC · JPL
22720	1998 SF_{49}	—	September 24, 1998	Višnjan Observatory	Višnjan	CYB	15 km	MPC · JPL
22721	1998 ST_{50}	—	September 26, 1998	Kitt Peak	Spacewatch	·	10 km	MPC · JPL
22722 Timothycooper	1998 SE_{54}	Timothycooper	September 16, 1998	Anderson Mesa	LONEOS	·	6.3 km	MPC · JPL
22723 Edlopez	1998 SS_{58}	Edlopez	September 17, 1998	Anderson Mesa	LONEOS	·	5.3 km	MPC · JPL
22724 Byatt	1998 SE_{59}	Byatt	September 17, 1998	Anderson Mesa	LONEOS	THM	14 km	MPC · JPL
22725 Drabble	1998 SN_{62}	Drabble	September 19, 1998	Anderson Mesa	LONEOS	V	3.6 km	MPC · JPL
22726	1998 SZ_{72}	—	September 21, 1998	La Silla	E. W. Elst	THM	8.4 km	MPC · JPL
22727	1998 SV_{82}	—	September 26, 1998	Socorro	LINEAR	EOS	8.8 km	MPC · JPL
22728	1998 SH_{106}	—	September 26, 1998	Socorro	LINEAR	·	10 km	MPC · JPL
22729 Anthennig	1998 SV_{110}	Anthennig	September 26, 1998	Socorro	LINEAR	·	2.1 km	MPC · JPL
22730 Jacobhurwitz	1998 SY_{118}	Jacobhurwitz	September 26, 1998	Socorro	LINEAR	·	3.3 km	MPC · JPL
22731	1998 SD_{122}	—	September 26, 1998	Socorro	LINEAR	EOS	8.3 km	MPC · JPL
22732 Jakpor	1998 SZ_{122}	Jakpor	September 26, 1998	Socorro	LINEAR	THM	8.5 km	MPC · JPL
22733	1998 SN_{132}	—	September 26, 1998	Socorro	LINEAR	·	8.7 km	MPC · JPL
22734 Theojones	1998 SQ_{133}	Theojones	September 26, 1998	Socorro	LINEAR	NYS	3.4 km	MPC · JPL
22735	1998 SZ_{134}	—	September 26, 1998	Socorro	LINEAR	·	10 km	MPC · JPL
22736 Kamitaki	1998 SM_{137}	Kamitaki	September 26, 1998	Socorro	LINEAR	·	3.3 km	MPC · JPL
22737	1998 SY_{139}	—	September 26, 1998	Socorro	LINEAR	EOS	11 km	MPC · JPL
22738	1998 SL_{142}	—	September 26, 1998	Socorro	LINEAR	EOS	7.8 km	MPC · JPL
22739 Sikhote-Alin	1998 SA_{144}	Sikhote-Alin	September 18, 1998	La Silla	E. W. Elst	KOR	4.3 km	MPC · JPL
22740 Rayleigh	1998 SX_{146}	Rayleigh	September 20, 1998	La Silla	E. W. Elst	2:1J	9.8 km	MPC · JPL
22741	1998 SQ_{154}	—	September 26, 1998	Socorro	LINEAR	·	6.5 km	MPC · JPL
22742	1998 TX_{5}	—	October 15, 1998	Višnjan Observatory	K. Korlević	·	5.7 km	MPC · JPL
22743	1998 TD_{18}	—	October 13, 1998	Xinglong	SCAP	·	15 km	MPC · JPL
22744 Esterantonucci	1998 TB_{34}	Esterantonucci	October 14, 1998	Anderson Mesa	LONEOS	·	10 km	MPC · JPL
22745 Rikuzentakata	1998 TN_{34}	Rikuzentakata	October 14, 1998	Anderson Mesa	LONEOS	·	4.9 km	MPC · JPL
22746	1998 UC_{7}	—	October 22, 1998	Višnjan Observatory	K. Korlević	NAE	7.6 km	MPC · JPL
22747	1998 UD_{7}	—	October 22, 1998	Višnjan Observatory	K. Korlević	·	5.2 km	MPC · JPL
22748	1998 UW_{8}	—	October 17, 1998	Xinglong	SCAP	·	8.6 km	MPC · JPL
22749	1998 UF_{19}	—	October 27, 1998	Višnjan Observatory	K. Korlević	NYS	3.1 km	MPC · JPL
22750	1998 US_{20}	—	October 29, 1998	Višnjan Observatory	K. Korlević	·	4.1 km	MPC · JPL
22751	1998 UA_{27}	—	October 18, 1998	La Silla	E. W. Elst	·	4.4 km	MPC · JPL
22752 Sabrinamasiero	1998 VS_{34}	Sabrinamasiero	November 15, 1998	San Marcello	A. Boattini, M. Tombelli	·	4.5 km	MPC · JPL
22753	1998 WT	—	November 16, 1998	Socorro	LINEAR	APO +1km · PHA	1.0 km	MPC · JPL
22754 Olympus	1998 WJ_{8}	Olympus	November 26, 1998	Reedy Creek	J. Broughton	·	22 km	MPC · JPL
22755	1998 WO_{9}	—	November 28, 1998	Višnjan Observatory	K. Korlević	·	2.6 km	MPC · JPL
22756 Manpreetkaur	1998 WA_{10}	Manpreetkaur	November 18, 1998	Socorro	LINEAR	·	3.8 km	MPC · JPL
22757 Klimcak	1998 WF_{11}	Klimcak	November 21, 1998	Socorro	LINEAR	KOR	4.1 km	MPC · JPL
22758 Lemp	1998 WP_{18}	Lemp	November 21, 1998	Socorro	LINEAR	·	2.3 km	MPC · JPL
22759	1998 XA_{4}	—	December 11, 1998	Oizumi	T. Kobayashi	·	5.3 km	MPC · JPL
22760	1998 XR_{4}	—	December 12, 1998	Oizumi	T. Kobayashi	WIT ·	4.5 km	MPC · JPL
22761	1998 YH_{4}	—	December 16, 1998	Woomera	F. B. Zoltowski	slow	3.8 km	MPC · JPL
22762	1998 YM_{12}	—	December 27, 1998	Gekko	T. Kagawa	KOR	4.7 km	MPC · JPL
22763	1999 AW_{3}	—	January 10, 1999	Oizumi	T. Kobayashi	·	4.2 km	MPC · JPL
22764	1999 AX_{3}	—	January 10, 1999	Oizumi	T. Kobayashi	·	2.5 km	MPC · JPL
22765	1999 AR_{5}	—	January 12, 1999	Oizumi	T. Kobayashi	EOS	7.4 km	MPC · JPL
22766	1999 AE_{7}	—	January 9, 1999	Višnjan Observatory	K. Korlević	·	5.8 km	MPC · JPL
22767	1999 AL_{21}	—	January 14, 1999	Višnjan Observatory	K. Korlević	NYS	4.2 km	MPC · JPL
22768	1999 AU_{32}	—	January 15, 1999	Kitt Peak	Spacewatch	KOR	4.1 km	MPC · JPL
22769 Aurelianora	1999 BD_{4}	Aurelianora	January 19, 1999	Gnosca	S. Sposetti	·	11 km	MPC · JPL
22770	1999 BR_{14}	—	January 24, 1999	Woomera	F. B. Zoltowski	·	11 km	MPC · JPL
22771	1999 CU_{3}	—	February 10, 1999	Socorro	LINEAR	APO +1km	1.4 km	MPC · JPL
22772	1999 CU_{17}	—	February 10, 1999	Socorro	LINEAR	KOR	5.8 km	MPC · JPL
22773	1999 CV_{17}	—	February 10, 1999	Socorro	LINEAR	THM	8.8 km	MPC · JPL
22774	1999 CA_{19}	—	February 10, 1999	Socorro	LINEAR	EOS	7.5 km	MPC · JPL
22775 Jasonelloyd	1999 CV_{20}	Jasonelloyd	February 10, 1999	Socorro	LINEAR	·	6.8 km	MPC · JPL
22776 Matossian	1999 CS_{24}	Matossian	February 10, 1999	Socorro	LINEAR	V	3.2 km	MPC · JPL
22777 McAliley	1999 CU_{29}	McAliley	February 10, 1999	Socorro	LINEAR	NYS	2.6 km	MPC · JPL
22778	1999 CN_{63}	—	February 12, 1999	Socorro	LINEAR	slow	9.3 km	MPC · JPL
22779	1999 FU_{24}	—	March 19, 1999	Socorro	LINEAR	·	8.7 km	MPC · JPL
22780 McAlpine	1999 FS_{37}	McAlpine	March 20, 1999	Socorro	LINEAR	·	1.9 km	MPC · JPL
22781	1999 GN_{4}	—	April 10, 1999	Višnjan Observatory	K. Korlević	·	3.4 km	MPC · JPL
22782 Kushalnaik	1999 GJ_{19}	Kushalnaik	April 15, 1999	Socorro	LINEAR	·	2.9 km	MPC · JPL
22783 Teng	1999 GT_{52}	Teng	April 11, 1999	Anderson Mesa	LONEOS	·	5.5 km	MPC · JPL
22784 Theresaoei	1999 JM_{43}	Theresaoei	May 10, 1999	Socorro	LINEAR	·	4.7 km	MPC · JPL
22785	1999 JP_{62}	—	May 10, 1999	Socorro	LINEAR	EOS	7.2 km	MPC · JPL
22786 Willipete	1999 JY_{73}	Willipete	May 12, 1999	Socorro	LINEAR	·	6.3 km	MPC · JPL
22787	1999 JL_{81}	—	May 14, 1999	Socorro	LINEAR	·	5.2 km	MPC · JPL
22788 von Steuben	1999 JA_{136}	von Steuben	May 15, 1999	Anderson Mesa	LONEOS	·	4.8 km	MPC · JPL
22789	1999 KA_{4}	—	May 18, 1999	Kitt Peak	Spacewatch	·	2.0 km	MPC · JPL
22790	1999 KP_{4}	—	May 20, 1999	Socorro	LINEAR	H	3.8 km	MPC · JPL
22791 Twarog	1999 LL_{7}	Twarog	June 14, 1999	Farpoint	G. Bell	·	2.1 km	MPC · JPL
22792	1999 NU	—	July 7, 1999	Višnjan Observatory	K. Korlević	V	1.9 km	MPC · JPL
22793	1999 NW_{1}	—	July 12, 1999	Socorro	LINEAR	PHO	3.2 km	MPC · JPL
22794 Lindsayleona	1999 NH_{4}	Lindsayleona	July 13, 1999	Socorro	LINEAR	fast	2.1 km	MPC · JPL
22795	1999 NX_{14}	—	July 14, 1999	Socorro	LINEAR	NYS	2.5 km	MPC · JPL
22796	1999 NH_{18}	—	July 14, 1999	Socorro	LINEAR	EOS · slow	8.8 km	MPC · JPL
22797	1999 NO_{18}	—	July 14, 1999	Socorro	LINEAR	NYS	3.2 km	MPC · JPL
22798	1999 NU_{18}	—	July 14, 1999	Socorro	LINEAR	EOS	6.7 km	MPC · JPL
22799	1999 NH_{21}	—	July 14, 1999	Socorro	LINEAR	·	2.1 km	MPC · JPL
22800	1999 NY_{22}	—	July 14, 1999	Socorro	LINEAR	·	3.1 km	MPC · JPL

== 22801–22900 ==
back to top

Designation			Discovery			Properties		Ref
Permanent	Provisional	Named after	Date	Site	Discoverer(s)	Category	Diam.	Ref
22801	1999 NP_{39}	—	July 14, 1999	Socorro	LINEAR	·	4.4 km	MPC · JPL
22802 Sigiriya	1999 PK_{6}	Sigiriya	August 13, 1999	Anderson Mesa	LONEOS	BAP	2.5 km	MPC · JPL
22803	1999 RV	—	September 4, 1999	Catalina	CSS	(5)	4.6 km	MPC · JPL
22804	1999 RZ_{1}	—	September 6, 1999	Višnjan Observatory	K. Korlević	MAS	2.4 km	MPC · JPL
22805	1999 RR_{2}	—	September 6, 1999	Catalina	CSS	(22805)	16 km	MPC · JPL
22806	1999 RZ_{3}	—	September 4, 1999	Catalina	CSS	·	2.2 km	MPC · JPL
22807	1999 RK_{7}	—	September 3, 1999	Kitt Peak	Spacewatch	·	2.5 km	MPC · JPL
22808	1999 RU_{12}	—	September 7, 1999	Socorro	LINEAR	L5	20 km	MPC · JPL
22809 Kensiequade	1999 RL_{13}	Kensiequade	September 7, 1999	Socorro	LINEAR	NYS	2.7 km	MPC · JPL
22810 Rawat	1999 RQ_{14}	Rawat	September 7, 1999	Socorro	LINEAR	·	2.3 km	MPC · JPL
22811	1999 RS_{15}	—	September 7, 1999	Socorro	LINEAR	·	1.6 km	MPC · JPL
22812 Ricker	1999 RY_{15}	Ricker	September 7, 1999	Socorro	LINEAR	NYS · slow ·	5.1 km	MPC · JPL
22813	1999 RY_{17}	—	September 7, 1999	Socorro	LINEAR	(5)	3.7 km	MPC · JPL
22814	1999 RJ_{18}	—	September 7, 1999	Socorro	LINEAR	NYS	3.3 km	MPC · JPL
22815 Sewell	1999 RN_{18}	Sewell	September 7, 1999	Socorro	LINEAR	·	1.8 km	MPC · JPL
22816	1999 RL_{21}	—	September 7, 1999	Socorro	LINEAR	NYS	1.5 km	MPC · JPL
22817 Shankar	1999 RC_{23}	Shankar	September 7, 1999	Socorro	LINEAR	·	5.3 km	MPC · JPL
22818	1999 RX_{25}	—	September 7, 1999	Socorro	LINEAR	·	2.6 km	MPC · JPL
22819 Davidtao	1999 RY_{26}	Davidtao	September 7, 1999	Socorro	LINEAR	·	2.4 km	MPC · JPL
22820	1999 RM_{31}	—	September 9, 1999	Višnjan Observatory	K. Korlević	·	3.2 km	MPC · JPL
22821	1999 RS_{33}	—	September 2, 1999	Eskridge	G. Bell, G. Hug	·	2.0 km	MPC · JPL
22822	1999 RT_{35}	—	September 12, 1999	Višnjan Observatory	K. Korlević	·	2.9 km	MPC · JPL
22823	1999 RN_{38}	—	September 13, 1999	Višnjan Observatory	K. Korlević	·	3.6 km	MPC · JPL
22824 von Neumann	1999 RP_{38}	von Neumann	September 12, 1999	Ondřejov	P. Pravec, P. Kušnirák	·	2.8 km	MPC · JPL
22825	1999 RO_{39}	—	September 13, 1999	Zeno	T. Stafford	·	2.6 km	MPC · JPL
22826	1999 RR_{42}	—	September 14, 1999	Višnjan Observatory	K. Korlević	EOS	6.8 km	MPC · JPL
22827 Arvernia	1999 RQ_{45}	Arvernia	September 8, 1999	Uccle	T. Pauwels	V	2.0 km	MPC · JPL
22828 Jaynethomp	1999 RF_{50}	Jaynethomp	September 7, 1999	Socorro	LINEAR	·	5.5 km	MPC · JPL
22829 Paigerin	1999 RH_{52}	Paigerin	September 7, 1999	Socorro	LINEAR	NYS	2.9 km	MPC · JPL
22830 Tinker	1999 RW_{52}	Tinker	September 7, 1999	Socorro	LINEAR	·	7.8 km	MPC · JPL
22831 Trevanvoorth	1999 RF_{53}	Trevanvoorth	September 7, 1999	Socorro	LINEAR	·	5.0 km	MPC · JPL
22832	1999 RM_{54}	—	September 7, 1999	Socorro	LINEAR	·	5.8 km	MPC · JPL
22833 Scottyu	1999 RR_{75}	Scottyu	September 7, 1999	Socorro	LINEAR	·	2.6 km	MPC · JPL
22834	1999 RL_{76}	—	September 7, 1999	Socorro	LINEAR	(2076)	2.8 km	MPC · JPL
22835 Rickgardner	1999 RT_{88}	Rickgardner	September 7, 1999	Socorro	LINEAR	·	3.7 km	MPC · JPL
22836 Leeannragasa	1999 RH_{89}	Leeannragasa	September 7, 1999	Socorro	LINEAR	·	2.9 km	MPC · JPL
22837 Richardcruz	1999 RR_{90}	Richardcruz	September 7, 1999	Socorro	LINEAR	·	2.8 km	MPC · JPL
22838 Darcyhampton	1999 RF_{91}	Darcyhampton	September 7, 1999	Socorro	LINEAR	HOF	7.9 km	MPC · JPL
22839 Richlawrence	1999 RW_{92}	Richlawrence	September 7, 1999	Socorro	LINEAR	·	2.1 km	MPC · JPL
22840 Villarreal	1999 RB_{98}	Villarreal	September 7, 1999	Socorro	LINEAR	·	3.6 km	MPC · JPL
22841	1999 RK_{105}	—	September 8, 1999	Socorro	LINEAR	·	4.4 km	MPC · JPL
22842 Alenashort	1999 RC_{107}	Alenashort	September 8, 1999	Socorro	LINEAR	·	2.7 km	MPC · JPL
22843 Stverak	1999 RF_{107}	Stverak	September 8, 1999	Socorro	LINEAR	·	9.0 km	MPC · JPL
22844	1999 RU_{111}	—	September 9, 1999	Socorro	LINEAR	T_{j} (2.98)	6.7 km	MPC · JPL
22845	1999 RA_{115}	—	September 9, 1999	Socorro	LINEAR	·	8.0 km	MPC · JPL
22846 Fredwhitaker	1999 RN_{120}	Fredwhitaker	September 9, 1999	Socorro	LINEAR	·	3.0 km	MPC · JPL
22847 Utley	1999 RO_{121}	Utley	September 9, 1999	Socorro	LINEAR	·	2.4 km	MPC · JPL
22848 Chrisharriot	1999 RJ_{125}	Chrisharriot	September 9, 1999	Socorro	LINEAR	NYS ·	4.4 km	MPC · JPL
22849	1999 RZ_{125}	—	September 9, 1999	Socorro	LINEAR	·	5.7 km	MPC · JPL
22850	1999 RZ_{126}	—	September 9, 1999	Socorro	LINEAR	·	8.1 km	MPC · JPL
22851	1999 RX_{127}	—	September 9, 1999	Socorro	LINEAR	·	2.7 km	MPC · JPL
22852 Kinney	1999 RN_{129}	Kinney	September 9, 1999	Socorro	LINEAR	·	2.2 km	MPC · JPL
22853	1999 RH_{130}	—	September 9, 1999	Socorro	LINEAR	·	2.1 km	MPC · JPL
22854	1999 RY_{131}	—	September 9, 1999	Socorro	LINEAR	EUN	2.5 km	MPC · JPL
22855 Donnajones	1999 RG_{139}	Donnajones	September 9, 1999	Socorro	LINEAR	(5)	3.8 km	MPC · JPL
22856 Stevenzeiher	1999 RX_{142}	Stevenzeiher	September 9, 1999	Socorro	LINEAR	·	2.4 km	MPC · JPL
22857 Hyde	1999 RJ_{143}	Hyde	September 9, 1999	Socorro	LINEAR	·	2.3 km	MPC · JPL
22858 Suesong	1999 RV_{143}	Suesong	September 9, 1999	Socorro	LINEAR	·	2.8 km	MPC · JPL
22859	1999 RF_{146}	—	September 9, 1999	Socorro	LINEAR	·	2.4 km	MPC · JPL
22860 Francylemp	1999 RA_{149}	Francylemp	September 9, 1999	Socorro	LINEAR	MAS	2.3 km	MPC · JPL
22861	1999 RY_{149}	—	September 9, 1999	Socorro	LINEAR	·	1.8 km	MPC · JPL
22862 Janinedavis	1999 RG_{152}	Janinedavis	September 9, 1999	Socorro	LINEAR	·	1.7 km	MPC · JPL
22863 Namarkarian	1999 RJ_{152}	Namarkarian	September 9, 1999	Socorro	LINEAR	·	2.6 km	MPC · JPL
22864	1999 RO_{161}	—	September 9, 1999	Socorro	LINEAR	THM	14 km	MPC · JPL
22865 Amymoffett	1999 RQ_{173}	Amymoffett	September 9, 1999	Socorro	LINEAR	·	5.7 km	MPC · JPL
22866	1999 RQ_{179}	—	September 9, 1999	Socorro	LINEAR	·	3.0 km	MPC · JPL
22867	1999 RZ_{184}	—	September 9, 1999	Socorro	LINEAR	EOS	6.5 km	MPC · JPL
22868 Karst	1999 RX_{187}	Karst	September 9, 1999	Socorro	LINEAR	·	4.7 km	MPC · JPL
22869 Brianmcfar	1999 RP_{190}	Brianmcfar	September 10, 1999	Socorro	LINEAR	·	3.5 km	MPC · JPL
22870 Rosing	1999 RO_{193}	Rosing	September 14, 1999	Fountain Hills	C. W. Juels	EUN	9.3 km	MPC · JPL
22871 Ellenoei	1999 RX_{193}	Ellenoei	September 7, 1999	Socorro	LINEAR	·	2.7 km	MPC · JPL
22872 Williamweber	1999 RM_{194}	Williamweber	September 7, 1999	Socorro	LINEAR	·	2.4 km	MPC · JPL
22873 Heatherholt	1999 RR_{194}	Heatherholt	September 7, 1999	Socorro	LINEAR	·	2.4 km	MPC · JPL
22874 Haydeephelps	1999 RO_{197}	Haydeephelps	September 8, 1999	Socorro	LINEAR	·	3.6 km	MPC · JPL
22875 Lanejackson	1999 RB_{198}	Lanejackson	September 8, 1999	Socorro	LINEAR	·	2.0 km	MPC · JPL
22876	1999 RR_{198}	—	September 9, 1999	Socorro	LINEAR	·	4.8 km	MPC · JPL
22877 Reginamiller	1999 RR_{200}	Reginamiller	September 8, 1999	Socorro	LINEAR	(2076)	3.4 km	MPC · JPL
22878	1999 RA_{202}	—	September 8, 1999	Socorro	LINEAR	·	6.4 km	MPC · JPL
22879	1999 RJ_{211}	—	September 8, 1999	Socorro	LINEAR	EUN	3.3 km	MPC · JPL
22880 Pulaski	1999 RL_{224}	Pulaski	September 7, 1999	Anderson Mesa	LONEOS	·	2.5 km	MPC · JPL
22881	1999 RJ_{227}	—	September 5, 1999	Kitt Peak	Spacewatch	·	4.6 km	MPC · JPL
22882	1999 RV_{230}	—	September 8, 1999	Catalina	CSS	EUN	3.5 km	MPC · JPL
22883	1999 RC_{231}	—	September 8, 1999	Catalina	CSS	·	5.5 km	MPC · JPL
22884	1999 RK_{236}	—	September 8, 1999	Catalina	CSS	·	1.8 km	MPC · JPL
22885 Sakaemura	1999 RS_{239}	Sakaemura	September 8, 1999	Anderson Mesa	LONEOS	V	2.1 km	MPC · JPL
22886	1999 SB_{2}	—	September 18, 1999	Socorro	LINEAR	EUN	5.5 km	MPC · JPL
22887	1999 SX_{3}	—	September 29, 1999	Višnjan Observatory	K. Korlević	·	2.2 km	MPC · JPL
22888	1999 SL_{4}	—	September 29, 1999	Višnjan Observatory	K. Korlević	·	9.9 km	MPC · JPL
22889 Donnablaney	1999 SU_{7}	Donnablaney	September 29, 1999	Socorro	LINEAR	·	3.8 km	MPC · JPL
22890 Ruthaellis	1999 SF_{8}	Ruthaellis	September 29, 1999	Socorro	LINEAR	·	2.7 km	MPC · JPL
22891	1999 SO_{11}	—	September 30, 1999	Catalina	CSS	·	2.6 km	MPC · JPL
22892	1999 SV_{16}	—	September 29, 1999	Catalina	CSS	·	3.4 km	MPC · JPL
22893	1999 SD_{18}	—	September 30, 1999	Socorro	LINEAR	·	3.1 km	MPC · JPL
22894	1999 TW	—	October 1, 1999	Višnjan Observatory	K. Korlević	·	3.2 km	MPC · JPL
22895	1999 TV_{5}	—	October 6, 1999	High Point	D. K. Chesney	·	4.7 km	MPC · JPL
22896	1999 TU_{6}	—	October 6, 1999	Višnjan Observatory	K. Korlević, M. Jurić	·	3.3 km	MPC · JPL
22897	1999 TH_{7}	—	October 6, 1999	Višnjan Observatory	K. Korlević, M. Jurić	V	3.5 km	MPC · JPL
22898 Falce	1999 TF_{12}	Falce	October 10, 1999	Gnosca	S. Sposetti	·	4.8 km	MPC · JPL
22899 Alconrad	1999 TO_{14}	Alconrad	October 11, 1999	Višnjan Observatory	K. Korlević, M. Jurić	KOR · moon	5.7 km	MPC · JPL
22900 Trudie	1999 TW_{14}	Trudie	October 11, 1999	Fountain Hills	C. W. Juels	·	4.5 km	MPC · JPL

== 22901–23000 ==
back to top

Designation			Discovery			Properties		Ref
Permanent	Provisional	Named after	Date	Site	Discoverer(s)	Category	Diam.	Ref
22901 Ivanbella	1999 TY_{15}	Ivanbella	October 12, 1999	Ondřejov	P. Kušnirák, P. Pravec	·	4.3 km	MPC · JPL
22902	1999 TH_{17}	—	October 15, 1999	Višnjan Observatory	K. Korlević	KOR	4.8 km	MPC · JPL
22903 Georgeclooney	1999 TU_{18}	Georgeclooney	October 14, 1999	Monte Agliale	S. Donati	PHO	3.7 km	MPC · JPL
22904	1999 TL_{19}	—	October 9, 1999	Uto	F. Uto	·	6.7 km	MPC · JPL
22905 Liciniotoso	1999 TO_{19}	Liciniotoso	October 14, 1999	Farra d'Isonzo	Farra d'Isonzo	slow	3.1 km	MPC · JPL
22906 Lisauckis	1999 TQ_{25}	Lisauckis	October 3, 1999	Socorro	LINEAR	·	2.6 km	MPC · JPL
22907 van Voorthuijsen	1999 TL_{26}	van Voorthuijsen	October 3, 1999	Socorro	LINEAR	EOS	5.1 km	MPC · JPL
22908 Bayefsky-Anand	1999 TK_{27}	Bayefsky-Anand	October 3, 1999	Socorro	LINEAR	V	3.4 km	MPC · JPL
22909 Gongmyunglee	1999 TJ_{28}	Gongmyunglee	October 4, 1999	Socorro	LINEAR	·	3.0 km	MPC · JPL
22910 Ruiwang	1999 TM_{30}	Ruiwang	October 4, 1999	Socorro	LINEAR	·	4.5 km	MPC · JPL
22911 Johnpardon	1999 TX_{30}	Johnpardon	October 4, 1999	Socorro	LINEAR	·	2.5 km	MPC · JPL
22912 Noraxu	1999 TF_{31}	Noraxu	October 4, 1999	Socorro	LINEAR	·	3.5 km	MPC · JPL
22913 Brockman	1999 TO_{32}	Brockman	October 4, 1999	Socorro	LINEAR	·	4.6 km	MPC · JPL
22914 Tsunanmachi	1999 TU_{36}	Tsunanmachi	October 13, 1999	Anderson Mesa	LONEOS	·	5.4 km	MPC · JPL
22915	1999 TA_{40}	—	October 3, 1999	Catalina	CSS	EOS	6.6 km	MPC · JPL
22916	1999 TX_{40}	—	October 5, 1999	Catalina	CSS	·	2.9 km	MPC · JPL
22917	1999 TA_{77}	—	October 10, 1999	Kitt Peak	Spacewatch	·	3.3 km	MPC · JPL
22918	1999 TZ_{80}	—	October 11, 1999	Kitt Peak	Spacewatch	·	3.4 km	MPC · JPL
22919 Shuwan	1999 TR_{91}	Shuwan	October 2, 1999	Socorro	LINEAR	·	3.7 km	MPC · JPL
22920 Kaitduncan	1999 TF_{94}	Kaitduncan	October 2, 1999	Socorro	LINEAR	KOR	4.6 km	MPC · JPL
22921 Siyuanliu	1999 TG_{95}	Siyuanliu	October 2, 1999	Socorro	LINEAR	·	2.5 km	MPC · JPL
22922 Sophiecai	1999 TF_{97}	Sophiecai	October 2, 1999	Socorro	LINEAR	·	1.8 km	MPC · JPL
22923 Kathrynblair	1999 TM_{97}	Kathrynblair	October 2, 1999	Socorro	LINEAR	·	2.0 km	MPC · JPL
22924 Deshpande	1999 TH_{101}	Deshpande	October 2, 1999	Socorro	LINEAR	·	11 km	MPC · JPL
22925	1999 TH_{104}	—	October 3, 1999	Socorro	LINEAR	(5)	3.3 km	MPC · JPL
22926	1999 TK_{106}	—	October 4, 1999	Socorro	LINEAR	EUN	4.4 km	MPC · JPL
22927 Blewett	1999 TW_{110}	Blewett	October 4, 1999	Socorro	LINEAR	·	2.9 km	MPC · JPL
22928 Templehe	1999 TS_{111}	Templehe	October 15, 1999	Socorro	LINEAR	NYS	3.9 km	MPC · JPL
22929 Seanwahl	1999 TL_{126}	Seanwahl	October 4, 1999	Socorro	LINEAR	·	3.2 km	MPC · JPL
22930	1999 TN_{128}	—	October 5, 1999	Socorro	LINEAR	·	2.0 km	MPC · JPL
22931	1999 TB_{132}	—	October 6, 1999	Socorro	LINEAR	·	11 km	MPC · JPL
22932 Orenbrecher	1999 TU_{136}	Orenbrecher	October 6, 1999	Socorro	LINEAR	·	3.6 km	MPC · JPL
22933 Mareverett	1999 TZ_{141}	Mareverett	October 7, 1999	Socorro	LINEAR	·	3.5 km	MPC · JPL
22934	1999 TN_{155}	—	October 7, 1999	Socorro	LINEAR	THM	7.7 km	MPC · JPL
22935	1999 TO_{155}	—	October 7, 1999	Socorro	LINEAR	THM	8.3 km	MPC · JPL
22936 Ricmccutchen	1999 TR_{172}	Ricmccutchen	October 10, 1999	Socorro	LINEAR	·	5.5 km	MPC · JPL
22937 Nataliavella	1999 TZ_{172}	Nataliavella	October 10, 1999	Socorro	LINEAR	·	2.2 km	MPC · JPL
22938 Brilawrence	1999 TS_{173}	Brilawrence	October 10, 1999	Socorro	LINEAR	THM	4.6 km	MPC · JPL
22939 Handlin	1999 TU_{173}	Handlin	October 10, 1999	Socorro	LINEAR	KOR	3.4 km	MPC · JPL
22940 Chyan	1999 TF_{178}	Chyan	October 10, 1999	Socorro	LINEAR	NYS ·	4.3 km	MPC · JPL
22941	1999 TG_{194}	—	October 12, 1999	Socorro	LINEAR	·	2.6 km	MPC · JPL
22942 Alexacourtis	1999 TZ_{205}	Alexacourtis	October 13, 1999	Socorro	LINEAR	·	3.7 km	MPC · JPL
22943	1999 TV_{209}	—	October 14, 1999	Socorro	LINEAR	HYG	7.0 km	MPC · JPL
22944 Sarahmarzen	1999 TB_{216}	Sarahmarzen	October 15, 1999	Socorro	LINEAR	·	2.2 km	MPC · JPL
22945 Schikowski	1999 TY_{216}	Schikowski	October 15, 1999	Socorro	LINEAR	·	3.0 km	MPC · JPL
22946	1999 TH_{218}	—	October 15, 1999	Socorro	LINEAR	·	8.3 km	MPC · JPL
22947 Carolsuh	1999 TW_{218}	Carolsuh	October 15, 1999	Socorro	LINEAR	NYS	3.7 km	MPC · JPL
22948 Maidanak	1999 TR_{222}	Maidanak	October 2, 1999	Anderson Mesa	LONEOS	·	4.2 km	MPC · JPL
22949	1999 TH_{238}	—	October 4, 1999	Catalina	CSS	·	2.3 km	MPC · JPL
22950	1999 TO_{241}	—	October 4, 1999	Catalina	CSS	V	1.8 km	MPC · JPL
22951 Okabekazuko	1999 TA_{243}	Okabekazuko	October 4, 1999	Anderson Mesa	LONEOS	·	14 km	MPC · JPL
22952 Hommasachi	1999 TF_{243}	Hommasachi	October 5, 1999	Anderson Mesa	LONEOS	·	6.9 km	MPC · JPL
22953	1999 TW_{245}	—	October 7, 1999	Catalina	CSS	·	5.1 km	MPC · JPL
22954	1999 TU_{248}	—	October 8, 1999	Catalina	CSS	·	6.0 km	MPC · JPL
22955 Tibees	1999 TH_{251}	Tibees	October 7, 1999	Catalina	CSS	·	16 km	MPC · JPL
22956	1999 TK_{253}	—	October 9, 1999	Socorro	LINEAR	·	2.2 km	MPC · JPL
22957 Vaintrob	1999 TR_{270}	Vaintrob	October 3, 1999	Socorro	LINEAR	·	1.8 km	MPC · JPL
22958 Rohatgi	1999 TC_{288}	Rohatgi	October 10, 1999	Socorro	LINEAR	·	4.8 km	MPC · JPL
22959	1999 UY_{1}	—	October 16, 1999	Fountain Hills	C. W. Juels	·	4.0 km	MPC · JPL
22960	1999 UE_{4}	—	October 27, 1999	Višnjan Observatory	K. Korlević	·	3.7 km	MPC · JPL
22961 Rosegarcia	1999 UM_{14}	Rosegarcia	October 29, 1999	Catalina	CSS	NYS	4.2 km	MPC · JPL
22962	1999 UH_{15}	—	October 29, 1999	Catalina	CSS	·	5.8 km	MPC · JPL
22963 Fuls	1999 UN_{24}	Fuls	October 28, 1999	Catalina	CSS	(1338) (FLO)	2.4 km	MPC · JPL
22964	1999 UV_{28}	—	October 31, 1999	Kitt Peak	Spacewatch	·	6.3 km	MPC · JPL
22965	1999 UX_{40}	—	October 16, 1999	Socorro	LINEAR	HYG	8.9 km	MPC · JPL
22966	1999 UM_{45}	—	October 31, 1999	Catalina	CSS	·	2.3 km	MPC · JPL
22967	1999 VK_{4}	—	November 1, 1999	Catalina	CSS	DOR	7.5 km	MPC · JPL
22968	1999 VB_{5}	—	November 5, 1999	Višnjan Observatory	K. Korlević	KOR	3.4 km	MPC · JPL
22969	1999 VD_{6}	—	November 5, 1999	Oizumi	T. Kobayashi	THM	8.7 km	MPC · JPL
22970	1999 VT_{8}	—	November 8, 1999	Fountain Hills	C. W. Juels	·	7.9 km	MPC · JPL
22971	1999 VY_{8}	—	November 9, 1999	Fountain Hills	C. W. Juels	·	7.1 km	MPC · JPL
22972	1999 VR_{12}	—	November 11, 1999	Fountain Hills	C. W. Juels	EOS	10 km	MPC · JPL
22973	1999 VW_{16}	—	November 2, 1999	Kitt Peak	Spacewatch	·	3.9 km	MPC · JPL
22974	1999 VN_{21}	—	November 12, 1999	Višnjan Observatory	K. Korlević	·	4.0 km	MPC · JPL
22975	1999 VR_{23}	—	November 14, 1999	Fountain Hills	C. W. Juels	·	2.9 km	MPC · JPL
22976	1999 VY_{23}	—	November 13, 1999	Kashihara	F. Uto	·	9.6 km	MPC · JPL
22977	1999 VF_{24}	—	November 15, 1999	Fountain Hills	C. W. Juels	·	6.7 km	MPC · JPL
22978 Nyrola	1999 VO_{24}	Nyrola	November 14, 1999	Nyrölä	Nyrölän	ADE	11 km	MPC · JPL
22979	1999 VG_{25}	—	November 13, 1999	Oizumi	T. Kobayashi	·	6.1 km	MPC · JPL
22980	1999 VL_{27}	—	November 3, 1999	Catalina	CSS	·	3.1 km	MPC · JPL
22981 Katz	1999 VN_{30}	Katz	November 3, 1999	Socorro	LINEAR	·	3.7 km	MPC · JPL
22982 Emmacall	1999 VB_{31}	Emmacall	November 3, 1999	Socorro	LINEAR	KOR	4.2 km	MPC · JPL
22983 Schlingheyde	1999 VY_{34}	Schlingheyde	November 3, 1999	Socorro	LINEAR	KOR	3.3 km	MPC · JPL
22984	1999 VP_{36}	—	November 3, 1999	Socorro	LINEAR	THM	11 km	MPC · JPL
22985	1999 VY_{48}	—	November 3, 1999	Socorro	LINEAR	EUN	3.6 km	MPC · JPL
22986	1999 VX_{50}	—	November 3, 1999	Socorro	LINEAR	THM	6.1 km	MPC · JPL
22987 Rebeckaufman	1999 VO_{53}	Rebeckaufman	November 4, 1999	Socorro	LINEAR	KOR	3.3 km	MPC · JPL
22988 Jimmyhom	1999 VN_{58}	Jimmyhom	November 4, 1999	Socorro	LINEAR	·	3.6 km	MPC · JPL
22989 Loriskopp	1999 VY_{61}	Loriskopp	November 4, 1999	Socorro	LINEAR	·	4.2 km	MPC · JPL
22990 Mattbrenner	1999 VA_{62}	Mattbrenner	November 4, 1999	Socorro	LINEAR	·	2.5 km	MPC · JPL
22991 Jeffreyklus	1999 VX_{62}	Jeffreyklus	November 4, 1999	Socorro	LINEAR	·	2.6 km	MPC · JPL
22992 Susansmith	1999 VR_{65}	Susansmith	November 4, 1999	Socorro	LINEAR	·	4.7 km	MPC · JPL
22993 Aferrari	1999 VX_{65}	Aferrari	November 4, 1999	Socorro	LINEAR	·	3.7 km	MPC · JPL
22994 Workman	1999 VH_{66}	Workman	November 4, 1999	Socorro	LINEAR	KOR	3.8 km	MPC · JPL
22995 Allenjanes	1999 VM_{67}	Allenjanes	November 4, 1999	Socorro	LINEAR	·	5.5 km	MPC · JPL
22996 De Boo	1999 VP_{70}	De Boo	November 4, 1999	Socorro	LINEAR	KOR	3.3 km	MPC · JPL
22997	1999 VT_{70}	—	November 4, 1999	Socorro	LINEAR	·	8.4 km	MPC · JPL
22998 Waltimyer	1999 VY_{70}	Waltimyer	November 4, 1999	Socorro	LINEAR	THM	5.9 km	MPC · JPL
22999 Irizarry	1999 VS_{81}	Irizarry	November 5, 1999	Socorro	LINEAR	·	3.3 km	MPC · JPL
23000	1999 VU_{87}	—	November 7, 1999	Socorro	LINEAR	·	14 km	MPC · JPL

back to top

== See also ==
- Meanings of minor-planet names: 22001–23000
