= Andrea Di Paola =

Italian astronomer (born 1970)

Minor planets discovered: 11
7499 L'Aquila	July 24, 1996	MPC^{[A]}
(10589) 1996 OM_{2}	July 23, 1996	MPC^{[A]}
(10590) 1996 OP_{2}	July 24, 1996	MPC^{[A]}
11620 Susanagordon	July 23, 1996	MPC^{[A]}
(21337) 1997 BN_{9}	January 17, 1997	MPC^{[A]}
22451 Tymothycoons	November 13, 1996	MPC^{[A]}
(46673) 1996 OL_{2}	July 23, 1996	MPC^{[A]}
(65845) 1997 AK_{22}	January 14, 1997	MPC^{[A]}
(100514) 1997 AB_{24}	January 15, 1997	MPC^{[A]}
(100515) 1997 AM_{24}	January 15, 1997	MPC^{[A]}
(257513) 1997 AJ_{24}	January 15, 1997	MPC^{[A]}
^{A} with A. Boattini

Andrea Di Paola (born 1970) is an Italian astronomer and a discoverer of minor planets.

He works at the Rome Observatory and has been significantly involved in the CINEOS project. He is credited by the Minor Planet Center with the co-discovery of 11 numbered minor planets during 1996–1997, all made in collaboration with Italian astronomer Andrea Boattini.

The main-belt asteroid 27130 Dipaola, discovered by Andrea Boattini and Maura Tombelli in 1998, is named in his honour. Naming citation was published on 6 August 2003 (M.P.C. 49282).
