= 22577 Alfiuccio =

Main-belt asteroid

Discovery
- Discovered by: LONEOS
- Discovery site: Anderson Mesa Stn.
- Discovery date: 30 April 1998

Designations
- Named after: Alfio "Alfiuccio" Grasso (Italian boy)
- Alternative designations: 1998 HT_{51} · 1999 UZ_{8}
- Minor planet category: main-belt · Flora

Orbital characteristics
- Epoch 4 September 2017 (JD 2458000.5)
- Uncertainty parameter 0
- Observation arc: 20.11 yr (7,345 days)
- Aphelion: 2.6306 AU
- Perihelion: 1.9499 AU
- Semi-major axis: 2.2903 AU
- Eccentricity: 0.1486
- Orbital period (sidereal): 3.47 yr (1,266 days)
- Mean anomaly: 123.89°
- Mean motion: 0° 17^{m} 3.84^{s} / day
- Inclination: 3.8671°
- Longitude of ascending node: 65.751°
- Argument of perihelion: 251.04°

Physical characteristics
- Dimensions: 2.40 km (calculated)
- Synodic rotation period: 4.3704±0.0024 h
- Geometric albedo: 0.24 (assumed)
- Spectral type: S
- Absolute magnitude (H): 14.8 · 14.816±0.010 (R) · 15.27

22577 Alfiuccio (provisional designation 1998 HT_{51}) is a stony Flora asteroid from the inner regions of the asteroid belt, approximately 2.4 kilometers in diameter. It was discovered on 30 April 1998, by the Lowell Observatory Near-Earth-Object Search at Anderson Mesa Station in Flagstaff, Arizona, United States. It was named in memory of Alfio Grasso, an Italian boy from Sicily.

== Orbit and classification ==
Alfiuccio is a member of the Flora family, one of the largest families of stony asteroids. It orbits the Sun in the inner main-belt at a distance of 1.9–2.6 AU once every 3 years and 6 months (1,266 days). Its orbit has an eccentricity of 0.15 and an inclination of 4° with respect to the ecliptic.

The asteroid's observation arc begins 20 months prior to its official discovery observation, with a precovery taken at the Chinese Xinglong Station in December 1996.

== Physical characteristics ==
=== Lightcurve ===
In December 2010, a rotational lightcurve of Alfiuccio was obtained from photometric observations in the R-band at the Palomar Transient Factory, California. Lightcurve analysis gave a rotation period of 4.3704 hours with a brightness variation of 0.36 magnitude (U=2).

=== Diameter and albedo estimate ===
The Collaborative Asteroid Lightcurve Link assumes an albedo of 0.24 – derived from 8 Flora, the largest member and namesake of its orbital family – and calculates a diameter of 2.4 kilometers, based on a weaker absolute magnitude of 15.27.

== Naming ==
This minor planet was named in memory of Alfio "Alfiuccio" Grasso (1992–2004) who died in a hunting accident on the slopes of Mount Etna, Italy. The body's name was proposed by C. Blanco and M. Di Martino. The official naming citation was published by the Minor Planet Center on 6 August 2009 (M.P.C. 66725).
