= List of minor planets: 696001–697000 =

The following is a partial list of minor planets, running from minor-planet number 696001 through 697000, inclusive. The primary data for this and other partial lists is based on JPL's "Small-Body Orbital Elements" and data available from the Minor Planet Center. Critical list information is also provided by the MPC, unless otherwise specified from Lowell Observatory. A detailed description of the table's columns and additional sources are given on the main page including a complete list of every page in this series, and a statistical break-up on the dynamical classification of minor planets.

Also see the summary list of all named bodies in numerical and alphabetical order, and the corresponding naming citations for the number range of this particular list. New namings may only be added to this list after official publication, as the preannouncement of names is condemned by the Working Group for Small Bodies Nomenclature of the International Astronomical Union.

Near-Earth obj.	MBA (inner)	MBA (outer)	Centaur
Mars-crosser	MBA (middle)	Jupiter trojan	Trans-Neptunian obj.
Unclassified

== 696001–696100 ==
Designation			Discovery			Properties		Ref
Permanent	Provisional	Named after	Date	Site	Discoverer(s)	Category	Diam.	Ref
696001	2016 CS_{213}	—	January 25, 2009	Kitt Peak	Spacewatch	SYL	3.9 km	MPC · JPL
696002	2016 CR_{217}	—	April 21, 2009	Mount Lemmon	Mount Lemmon Survey	·	1.0 km	MPC · JPL
696003	2016 CX_{218}	—	March 4, 2005	Kitt Peak	Spacewatch	·	2.9 km	MPC · JPL
696004	2016 CB_{220}	—	January 17, 2005	Kitt Peak	Spacewatch	·	900 m	MPC · JPL
696005	2016 CH_{221}	—	February 9, 2016	Haleakala	Pan-STARRS 1	NYS	850 m	MPC · JPL
696006	2016 CU_{222}	—	July 4, 2013	Haleakala	Pan-STARRS 1	·	1.7 km	MPC · JPL
696007	2016 CO_{231}	—	December 29, 2011	Mount Lemmon	Mount Lemmon Survey	·	1.1 km	MPC · JPL
696008	2016 CP_{231}	—	September 22, 2003	Palomar	NEAT	PHO	780 m	MPC · JPL
696009	2016 CD_{241}	—	February 10, 2016	Haleakala	Pan-STARRS 1	·	2.5 km	MPC · JPL
696010	2016 CW_{243}	—	April 2, 2011	Mount Lemmon	Mount Lemmon Survey	(5651)	2.6 km	MPC · JPL
696011	2016 CC_{246}	—	February 1, 2005	Kitt Peak	Spacewatch	·	3.1 km	MPC · JPL
696012	2016 CW_{249}	—	November 17, 1999	Kitt Peak	Spacewatch	KOR	1.3 km	MPC · JPL
696013	2016 CA_{253}	—	January 4, 2016	Haleakala	Pan-STARRS 1	·	3.4 km	MPC · JPL
696014	2016 CM_{253}	—	September 14, 2013	Haleakala	Pan-STARRS 1	·	3.2 km	MPC · JPL
696015	2016 CL_{254}	—	November 23, 2003	Kitt Peak	Spacewatch	·	2.7 km	MPC · JPL
696016	2016 CR_{264}	—	February 9, 2005	Mount Lemmon	Mount Lemmon Survey	·	920 m	MPC · JPL
696017	2016 CC_{265}	—	January 18, 2016	Haleakala	Pan-STARRS 1	MAS	540 m	MPC · JPL
696018	2016 CT_{265}	—	February 10, 2016	Haleakala	Pan-STARRS 1	H	450 m	MPC · JPL
696019	2016 CW_{265}	—	October 6, 2012	Haleakala	Pan-STARRS 1	H	300 m	MPC · JPL
696020	2016 CK_{274}	—	February 10, 2016	Haleakala	Pan-STARRS 1	·	1.3 km	MPC · JPL
696021	2016 CD_{277}	—	April 2, 2005	Mount Lemmon	Mount Lemmon Survey	MAS	510 m	MPC · JPL
696022	2016 CU_{278}	—	October 28, 2014	Haleakala	Pan-STARRS 1	·	1.1 km	MPC · JPL
696023	2016 CP_{281}	—	February 9, 2016	Haleakala	Pan-STARRS 1	·	1.0 km	MPC · JPL
696024	2016 CF_{283}	—	March 16, 2005	Mount Lemmon	Mount Lemmon Survey	·	2.6 km	MPC · JPL
696025	2016 CM_{283}	—	September 14, 2007	Mount Lemmon	Mount Lemmon Survey	THM	2.1 km	MPC · JPL
696026	2016 CA_{284}	—	March 11, 2005	Kitt Peak	Spacewatch	·	2.9 km	MPC · JPL
696027	2016 CJ_{286}	—	October 25, 2014	Mount Lemmon	Mount Lemmon Survey	KOR	1.1 km	MPC · JPL
696028	2016 CM_{286}	—	October 2, 2008	Mount Lemmon	Mount Lemmon Survey	EOS	1.4 km	MPC · JPL
696029	2016 CF_{287}	—	January 20, 2015	Haleakala	Pan-STARRS 1	·	2.1 km	MPC · JPL
696030	2016 CJ_{291}	—	August 15, 2013	Haleakala	Pan-STARRS 1	EOS	1.6 km	MPC · JPL
696031	2016 CA_{295}	—	February 1, 2016	Haleakala	Pan-STARRS 1	·	820 m	MPC · JPL
696032	2016 CH_{299}	—	October 2, 2013	Mount Lemmon	Mount Lemmon Survey	·	2.8 km	MPC · JPL
696033	2016 CN_{301}	—	February 5, 2016	Haleakala	Pan-STARRS 1	·	1.0 km	MPC · JPL
696034	2016 CY_{301}	—	December 26, 2011	Kitt Peak	Spacewatch	NYS	800 m	MPC · JPL
696035	2016 CM_{302}	—	February 5, 2016	Haleakala	Pan-STARRS 1	·	2.2 km	MPC · JPL
696036	2016 CB_{306}	—	February 6, 2016	Haleakala	Pan-STARRS 1	·	840 m	MPC · JPL
696037	2016 CU_{309}	—	February 9, 2016	Haleakala	Pan-STARRS 1	·	830 m	MPC · JPL
696038	2016 CA_{312}	—	February 10, 2016	Haleakala	Pan-STARRS 1	·	720 m	MPC · JPL
696039	2016 CC_{313}	—	February 3, 2012	Haleakala	Pan-STARRS 1	·	770 m	MPC · JPL
696040	2016 CU_{313}	—	February 10, 2016	Haleakala	Pan-STARRS 1	·	860 m	MPC · JPL
696041	2016 CG_{315}	—	August 12, 2013	Haleakala	Pan-STARRS 1	·	1.7 km	MPC · JPL
696042	2016 CY_{315}	—	February 11, 2016	Haleakala	Pan-STARRS 1	·	940 m	MPC · JPL
696043	2016 CG_{317}	—	May 1, 2012	Mount Lemmon	Mount Lemmon Survey	·	1.3 km	MPC · JPL
696044	2016 CE_{319}	—	October 27, 2013	Kitt Peak	Spacewatch	·	2.7 km	MPC · JPL
696045	2016 CL_{319}	—	December 22, 2003	Kitt Peak	Spacewatch	EOS	2.2 km	MPC · JPL
696046	2016 CK_{320}	—	February 11, 2016	Haleakala	Pan-STARRS 1	MAR	760 m	MPC · JPL
696047	2016 CO_{324}	—	February 9, 2016	Mount Lemmon	Mount Lemmon Survey	·	1.0 km	MPC · JPL
696048	2016 CC_{337}	—	February 11, 2016	Haleakala	Pan-STARRS 1	HYG	2.3 km	MPC · JPL
696049	2016 CC_{341}	—	February 5, 2016	Haleakala	Pan-STARRS 1	CLA	1.2 km	MPC · JPL
696050	2016 CY_{345}	—	February 5, 2016	Haleakala	Pan-STARRS 1	MAS	530 m	MPC · JPL
696051	2016 CM_{346}	—	February 2, 2016	Haleakala	Pan-STARRS 1	·	1.1 km	MPC · JPL
696052	2016 CG_{347}	—	February 5, 2016	Haleakala	Pan-STARRS 1	NYS	930 m	MPC · JPL
696053	2016 CZ_{350}	—	February 5, 2016	Haleakala	Pan-STARRS 1	NYS	820 m	MPC · JPL
696054	2016 CG_{352}	—	February 3, 2016	Haleakala	Pan-STARRS 1	·	940 m	MPC · JPL
696055	2016 CN_{352}	—	February 3, 2016	Haleakala	Pan-STARRS 1	·	1.4 km	MPC · JPL
696056	2016 CP_{356}	—	February 1, 2016	Haleakala	Pan-STARRS 1	·	950 m	MPC · JPL
696057	2016 CQ_{360}	—	February 4, 2016	Haleakala	Pan-STARRS 1	·	920 m	MPC · JPL
696058	2016 CQ_{363}	—	February 5, 2016	Haleakala	Pan-STARRS 1	·	2.9 km	MPC · JPL
696059	2016 CB_{368}	—	February 2, 2016	Calar Alto-CASADO	Hellmich, S., Mottola, S.	·	1.6 km	MPC · JPL
696060	2016 CL_{369}	—	February 6, 2016	Haleakala	Pan-STARRS 1	(1298)	2.4 km	MPC · JPL
696061	2016 CK_{376}	—	February 6, 2016	Haleakala	Pan-STARRS 1	·	1.2 km	MPC · JPL
696062	2016 CY_{379}	—	February 5, 2016	Haleakala	Pan-STARRS 1	·	1.1 km	MPC · JPL
696063	2016 CT_{382}	—	February 5, 2016	Haleakala	Pan-STARRS 1	V	610 m	MPC · JPL
696064	2016 CW_{382}	—	February 5, 2016	Haleakala	Pan-STARRS 1	·	950 m	MPC · JPL
696065	2016 CP_{383}	—	February 9, 2016	Mount Lemmon	Mount Lemmon Survey	V	560 m	MPC · JPL
696066	2016 CO_{391}	—	February 5, 2016	Haleakala	Pan-STARRS 1	·	910 m	MPC · JPL
696067	2016 CW_{406}	—	February 10, 2016	Haleakala	Pan-STARRS 1	3:2	2.9 km	MPC · JPL
696068	2016 CG_{419}	—	March 9, 2005	Mount Lemmon	Mount Lemmon Survey	PHO	730 m	MPC · JPL
696069	2016 DG_{6}	—	November 20, 2014	Haleakala	Pan-STARRS 1	·	2.9 km	MPC · JPL
696070	2016 DW_{8}	—	January 17, 2016	Haleakala	Pan-STARRS 1	·	2.3 km	MPC · JPL
696071	2016 DU_{9}	—	November 8, 2007	Kitt Peak	Spacewatch	·	830 m	MPC · JPL
696072	2016 DZ_{9}	—	January 1, 2012	Mount Lemmon	Mount Lemmon Survey	·	1.0 km	MPC · JPL
696073	2016 DF_{11}	—	September 3, 2013	Mount Lemmon	Mount Lemmon Survey	VER	2.3 km	MPC · JPL
696074	2016 DA_{19}	—	September 24, 2008	Kitt Peak	Spacewatch	·	2.3 km	MPC · JPL
696075	2016 DV_{22}	—	November 29, 2014	Mount Lemmon	Mount Lemmon Survey	KOR	1.3 km	MPC · JPL
696076	2016 DP_{23}	—	October 23, 2003	Apache Point	SDSS Collaboration	V	590 m	MPC · JPL
696077	2016 DZ_{23}	—	March 2, 2011	Kitt Peak	Spacewatch	·	2.4 km	MPC · JPL
696078	2016 DV_{25}	—	September 5, 2007	Mount Lemmon	Mount Lemmon Survey	·	2.6 km	MPC · JPL
696079	2016 DB_{29}	—	November 6, 2008	Mount Lemmon	Mount Lemmon Survey	·	2.2 km	MPC · JPL
696080	2016 DB_{30}	—	January 8, 2016	Haleakala	Pan-STARRS 1	EOS	1.7 km	MPC · JPL
696081	2016 DD_{31}	—	December 8, 2012	Kitt Peak	Spacewatch	H	540 m	MPC · JPL
696082	2016 DZ_{31}	—	March 4, 2011	Kitt Peak	Spacewatch	·	2.2 km	MPC · JPL
696083	2016 DB_{34}	—	April 2, 2011	Kitt Peak	Spacewatch	·	2.5 km	MPC · JPL
696084	2016 DG_{34}	—	April 17, 2005	Kitt Peak	Spacewatch	·	2.4 km	MPC · JPL
696085	2016 DL_{34}	—	February 28, 2016	Mount Lemmon	Mount Lemmon Survey	MAS	450 m	MPC · JPL
696086	2016 DL_{35}	—	February 29, 2016	Haleakala	Pan-STARRS 1	·	1.7 km	MPC · JPL
696087	2016 DG_{40}	—	February 29, 2016	Haleakala	Pan-STARRS 1	·	840 m	MPC · JPL
696088	2016 DV_{43}	—	February 28, 2016	Haleakala	Pan-STARRS 1	H	310 m	MPC · JPL
696089	2016 EA	—	January 18, 2016	Haleakala	Pan-STARRS 1	H	410 m	MPC · JPL
696090	2016 EJ	—	December 10, 2012	Haleakala	Pan-STARRS 1	H	420 m	MPC · JPL
696091	2016 EO_{5}	—	January 30, 2011	Kitt Peak	Spacewatch	·	2.1 km	MPC · JPL
696092	2016 EX_{5}	—	September 7, 2008	Mount Lemmon	Mount Lemmon Survey	·	2.2 km	MPC · JPL
696093	2016 EH_{8}	—	September 22, 2003	Kitt Peak	Spacewatch	·	1.0 km	MPC · JPL
696094	2016 EO_{8}	—	January 16, 2005	Mauna Kea	Veillet, C.	·	1.9 km	MPC · JPL
696095	2016 ER_{10}	—	October 2, 2006	Mount Lemmon	Mount Lemmon Survey	PHO	670 m	MPC · JPL
696096	2016 EC_{12}	—	July 20, 2001	Palomar	NEAT	·	3.6 km	MPC · JPL
696097	2016 EO_{12}	—	March 3, 2016	Haleakala	Pan-STARRS 1	·	1.1 km	MPC · JPL
696098	2016 EW_{19}	—	March 3, 2016	Haleakala	Pan-STARRS 1	MAR	770 m	MPC · JPL
696099	2016 ED_{20}	—	October 15, 2001	Apache Point	SDSS Collaboration	·	3.6 km	MPC · JPL
696100	2016 ES_{23}	—	July 23, 2006	Mount Lemmon	Mount Lemmon Survey	·	3.4 km	MPC · JPL

== 696101–696200 ==
back to top

Designation			Discovery			Properties		Ref
Permanent	Provisional	Named after	Date	Site	Discoverer(s)	Category	Diam.	Ref
696101	2016 EW_{24}	—	July 25, 2014	Haleakala	Pan-STARRS 1	H	360 m	MPC · JPL
696102	2016 ER_{26}	—	February 12, 2016	Haleakala	Pan-STARRS 1	EUN	790 m	MPC · JPL
696103	2016 ET_{36}	—	January 18, 2015	Mount Lemmon	Mount Lemmon Survey	EOS	2.0 km	MPC · JPL
696104	2016 EJ_{37}	—	March 3, 2016	Haleakala	Pan-STARRS 1	·	860 m	MPC · JPL
696105	2016 EN_{38}	—	October 22, 2014	Mount Lemmon	Mount Lemmon Survey	·	3.9 km	MPC · JPL
696106	2016 EO_{39}	—	May 1, 2012	Mount Lemmon	Mount Lemmon Survey	·	1.8 km	MPC · JPL
696107	2016 EM_{43}	—	December 20, 2009	Kitt Peak	Spacewatch	·	4.1 km	MPC · JPL
696108	2016 ED_{55}	—	March 6, 2011	Mount Lemmon	Mount Lemmon Survey	H	330 m	MPC · JPL
696109	2016 ES_{57}	—	August 4, 2013	Haleakala	Pan-STARRS 1	EOS	1.4 km	MPC · JPL
696110	2016 EF_{58}	—	March 10, 2005	Mount Lemmon	Mount Lemmon Survey	·	2.8 km	MPC · JPL
696111	2016 EK_{58}	—	October 9, 2007	Mount Lemmon	Mount Lemmon Survey	·	840 m	MPC · JPL
696112	2016 EB_{65}	—	March 4, 2016	Haleakala	Pan-STARRS 1	V	550 m	MPC · JPL
696113	2016 EX_{65}	—	September 15, 2006	Kitt Peak	Spacewatch	·	1.1 km	MPC · JPL
696114	2016 EM_{66}	—	February 4, 2016	Haleakala	Pan-STARRS 1	·	970 m	MPC · JPL
696115	2016 EO_{71}	—	December 20, 2014	Haleakala	Pan-STARRS 1	·	1.0 km	MPC · JPL
696116	2016 EF_{80}	—	October 23, 2013	Haleakala	Pan-STARRS 1	·	3.1 km	MPC · JPL
696117	2016 EK_{81}	—	May 21, 2006	Kitt Peak	Spacewatch	·	2.3 km	MPC · JPL
696118	2016 EL_{81}	—	August 29, 2013	Haleakala	Pan-STARRS 1	·	2.8 km	MPC · JPL
696119	2016 EG_{82}	—	October 28, 2013	Mount Lemmon	Mount Lemmon Survey	·	3.4 km	MPC · JPL
696120	2016 EY_{86}	—	October 19, 2003	Kitt Peak	Spacewatch	·	1.8 km	MPC · JPL
696121	2016 EH_{87}	—	January 17, 2005	Kitt Peak	Spacewatch	EOS	1.9 km	MPC · JPL
696122	2016 EP_{89}	—	September 18, 2003	Palomar	NEAT	·	1.5 km	MPC · JPL
696123	2016 EX_{91}	—	February 3, 2016	Haleakala	Pan-STARRS 1	PHO	710 m	MPC · JPL
696124	2016 EA_{93}	—	November 1, 2013	Mount Lemmon	Mount Lemmon Survey	·	2.7 km	MPC · JPL
696125	2016 EA_{98}	—	April 30, 2005	Kitt Peak	Spacewatch	·	1.3 km	MPC · JPL
696126	2016 ED_{100}	—	November 10, 2014	Haleakala	Pan-STARRS 1	PHO	690 m	MPC · JPL
696127	2016 EE_{100}	—	November 26, 2014	Haleakala	Pan-STARRS 1	EOS	1.9 km	MPC · JPL
696128	2016 EE_{106}	—	February 3, 2016	Haleakala	Pan-STARRS 1	MAR	790 m	MPC · JPL
696129	2016 ET_{108}	—	February 4, 2016	Haleakala	Pan-STARRS 1	·	890 m	MPC · JPL
696130	2016 EZ_{108}	—	September 23, 2008	Mount Lemmon	Mount Lemmon Survey	·	2.5 km	MPC · JPL
696131	2016 EO_{109}	—	February 3, 2016	Haleakala	Pan-STARRS 1	·	770 m	MPC · JPL
696132	2016 EY_{109}	—	February 11, 2016	Haleakala	Pan-STARRS 1	·	860 m	MPC · JPL
696133	2016 EG_{110}	—	January 28, 2000	Kitt Peak	Spacewatch	EOS	2.0 km	MPC · JPL
696134	2016 EE_{111}	—	October 25, 2001	Apache Point	SDSS Collaboration	·	3.3 km	MPC · JPL
696135	2016 EW_{115}	—	February 9, 2008	Mount Lemmon	Mount Lemmon Survey	·	860 m	MPC · JPL
696136	2016 EG_{121}	—	September 22, 2008	Kitt Peak	Spacewatch	·	2.2 km	MPC · JPL
696137	2016 ED_{124}	—	February 27, 2012	Haleakala	Pan-STARRS 1	·	730 m	MPC · JPL
696138	2016 EF_{125}	—	September 19, 2014	Haleakala	Pan-STARRS 1	·	910 m	MPC · JPL
696139	2016 EB_{130}	—	September 15, 2002	Palomar	R. Matson	·	2.6 km	MPC · JPL
696140	2016 EG_{130}	—	March 19, 2009	Kitt Peak	Spacewatch	·	820 m	MPC · JPL
696141	2016 EM_{134}	—	February 4, 2012	Haleakala	Pan-STARRS 1	·	1.1 km	MPC · JPL
696142	2016 EC_{142}	—	May 4, 2005	Mount Lemmon	Mount Lemmon Survey	THM	2.0 km	MPC · JPL
696143	2016 EV_{142}	—	March 10, 2016	Haleakala	Pan-STARRS 1	·	870 m	MPC · JPL
696144	2016 EX_{143}	—	August 16, 2012	ESA OGS	ESA OGS	THM	2.0 km	MPC · JPL
696145	2016 EB_{144}	—	April 14, 2008	Mount Lemmon	Mount Lemmon Survey	·	780 m	MPC · JPL
696146	2016 EL_{151}	—	February 1, 2012	Kitt Peak	Spacewatch	·	1 km	MPC · JPL
696147	2016 EZ_{153}	—	January 28, 2004	Kitt Peak	Spacewatch	·	2.7 km	MPC · JPL
696148	2016 EM_{155}	—	January 30, 2011	Haleakala	Pan-STARRS 1	·	2.8 km	MPC · JPL
696149	2016 EQ_{156}	—	January 16, 2016	Haleakala	Pan-STARRS 1	H	370 m	MPC · JPL
696150	2016 ET_{166}	—	October 9, 2007	Mount Lemmon	Mount Lemmon Survey	HYG	2.9 km	MPC · JPL
696151	2016 EO_{168}	—	March 11, 2016	Haleakala	Pan-STARRS 1	·	840 m	MPC · JPL
696152	2016 ER_{168}	—	February 26, 2008	Mount Lemmon	Mount Lemmon Survey	·	820 m	MPC · JPL
696153	2016 EV_{168}	—	November 17, 2014	Haleakala	Pan-STARRS 1	·	650 m	MPC · JPL
696154	2016 ER_{169}	—	March 13, 2012	Mount Lemmon	Mount Lemmon Survey	·	1.1 km	MPC · JPL
696155	2016 EE_{170}	—	January 18, 2004	Kitt Peak	Spacewatch	·	850 m	MPC · JPL
696156	2016 EF_{175}	—	March 27, 2011	Mount Lemmon	Mount Lemmon Survey	H	380 m	MPC · JPL
696157	2016 EH_{179}	—	February 17, 2010	Kitt Peak	Spacewatch	·	2.4 km	MPC · JPL
696158	2016 EO_{179}	—	April 14, 2008	Mount Lemmon	Mount Lemmon Survey	·	780 m	MPC · JPL
696159	2016 EL_{180}	—	March 23, 2012	Mount Lemmon	Mount Lemmon Survey	·	610 m	MPC · JPL
696160	2016 ED_{181}	—	April 17, 2009	Kitt Peak	Spacewatch	·	860 m	MPC · JPL
696161	2016 EV_{182}	—	March 3, 2016	Haleakala	Pan-STARRS 1	·	810 m	MPC · JPL
696162	2016 ES_{184}	—	January 1, 2016	Haleakala	Pan-STARRS 1	·	890 m	MPC · JPL
696163	2016 EK_{185}	—	August 15, 2013	Haleakala	Pan-STARRS 1	·	2.2 km	MPC · JPL
696164	2016 EM_{189}	—	November 26, 2014	Haleakala	Pan-STARRS 1	·	2.1 km	MPC · JPL
696165	2016 EB_{190}	—	August 15, 2013	Haleakala	Pan-STARRS 1	EOS	1.9 km	MPC · JPL
696166	2016 EG_{204}	—	October 1, 2014	Haleakala	Pan-STARRS 1	H	370 m	MPC · JPL
696167	2016 EB_{205}	—	December 16, 2012	ESA OGS	ESA OGS	H	450 m	MPC · JPL
696168	2016 EV_{205}	—	September 25, 2009	Kitt Peak	Spacewatch	H	310 m	MPC · JPL
696169	2016 EL_{207}	—	March 29, 2001	Kitt Peak	Spacewatch	·	790 m	MPC · JPL
696170	2016 EN_{207}	—	August 19, 2001	Cerro Tololo	Deep Ecliptic Survey	·	780 m	MPC · JPL
696171	2016 EL_{209}	—	March 4, 2016	Haleakala	Pan-STARRS 1	·	890 m	MPC · JPL
696172	2016 EZ_{216}	—	April 4, 2005	Catalina	CSS	·	2.5 km	MPC · JPL
696173	2016 EF_{217}	—	April 27, 2012	Haleakala	Pan-STARRS 1	MAR	720 m	MPC · JPL
696174	2016 ER_{221}	—	October 1, 2013	Kitt Peak	Spacewatch	VER	2.6 km	MPC · JPL
696175	2016 EC_{222}	—	February 26, 2008	Mount Lemmon	Mount Lemmon Survey	·	880 m	MPC · JPL
696176	2016 EE_{227}	—	October 7, 2008	Mount Lemmon	Mount Lemmon Survey	·	2.4 km	MPC · JPL
696177	2016 EJ_{230}	—	March 1, 2016	Haleakala	Pan-STARRS 1	PHO	670 m	MPC · JPL
696178	2016 EB_{233}	—	November 17, 2014	Haleakala	Pan-STARRS 1	·	940 m	MPC · JPL
696179	2016 ED_{235}	—	November 28, 2013	Mount Lemmon	Mount Lemmon Survey	·	1.5 km	MPC · JPL
696180	2016 ED_{236}	—	April 25, 2012	Mount Lemmon	Mount Lemmon Survey	·	780 m	MPC · JPL
696181	2016 EU_{238}	—	March 7, 2016	Haleakala	Pan-STARRS 1	·	1.0 km	MPC · JPL
696182	2016 EM_{240}	—	March 13, 2012	Mount Lemmon	Mount Lemmon Survey	·	700 m	MPC · JPL
696183	2016 EG_{242}	—	February 10, 2016	Haleakala	Pan-STARRS 1	HNS	760 m	MPC · JPL
696184	2016 ER_{245}	—	March 30, 2012	Mount Lemmon	Mount Lemmon Survey	·	620 m	MPC · JPL
696185	2016 EC_{247}	—	April 13, 2012	Haleakala	Pan-STARRS 1	·	780 m	MPC · JPL
696186	2016 EN_{250}	—	March 12, 2016	Haleakala	Pan-STARRS 1	H	350 m	MPC · JPL
696187	2016 EL_{252}	—	March 13, 2016	Haleakala	Pan-STARRS 1	MAR	700 m	MPC · JPL
696188	2016 EL_{265}	—	March 10, 2016	Haleakala	Pan-STARRS 1	BRG	990 m	MPC · JPL
696189	2016 EM_{265}	—	March 7, 2016	Haleakala	Pan-STARRS 1	HNS	790 m	MPC · JPL
696190	2016 EB_{266}	—	March 6, 2016	Haleakala	Pan-STARRS 1	·	790 m	MPC · JPL
696191	2016 EM_{266}	—	March 4, 2016	Haleakala	Pan-STARRS 1	·	1.0 km	MPC · JPL
696192	2016 EP_{266}	—	March 7, 2016	Haleakala	Pan-STARRS 1	·	760 m	MPC · JPL
696193	2016 ED_{269}	—	March 6, 2016	Haleakala	Pan-STARRS 1	·	870 m	MPC · JPL
696194	2016 EH_{269}	—	March 12, 2016	Haleakala	Pan-STARRS 1	·	1 km	MPC · JPL
696195	2016 EX_{272}	—	March 7, 2016	Haleakala	Pan-STARRS 1	·	760 m	MPC · JPL
696196	2016 ER_{282}	—	March 1, 2016	Mount Lemmon	Mount Lemmon Survey	·	840 m	MPC · JPL
696197	2016 EF_{305}	—	March 5, 2016	Haleakala	Pan-STARRS 1	H	380 m	MPC · JPL
696198	2016 EM_{310}	—	March 3, 2016	Mount Lemmon	Mount Lemmon Survey	·	850 m	MPC · JPL
696199	2016 EW_{316}	—	October 17, 2010	Mount Lemmon	Mount Lemmon Survey	·	910 m	MPC · JPL
696200	2016 EW_{317}	—	March 6, 2016	Haleakala	Pan-STARRS 1	·	1.6 km	MPC · JPL

== 696201–696300 ==
back to top

Designation			Discovery			Properties		Ref
Permanent	Provisional	Named after	Date	Site	Discoverer(s)	Category	Diam.	Ref
696201	2016 EE_{319}	—	March 13, 2016	Haleakala	Pan-STARRS 1	·	2.0 km	MPC · JPL
696202	2016 EQ_{324}	—	October 9, 2013	Mount Lemmon	Mount Lemmon Survey	·	2.4 km	MPC · JPL
696203	2016 EE_{360}	—	March 10, 2016	Mount Lemmon	Mount Lemmon Survey	3:2 · SHU	3.8 km	MPC · JPL
696204	2016 FE	—	September 15, 2009	Catalina	CSS	H	480 m	MPC · JPL
696205	2016 FP_{3}	—	December 12, 2012	Mount Lemmon	Mount Lemmon Survey	H	560 m	MPC · JPL
696206	2016 FR_{4}	—	February 1, 2009	Kitt Peak	Spacewatch	·	590 m	MPC · JPL
696207	2016 FS_{10}	—	February 20, 2009	Kitt Peak	Spacewatch	·	740 m	MPC · JPL
696208	2016 FE_{16}	—	March 29, 2012	Kitt Peak	Spacewatch	·	610 m	MPC · JPL
696209	2016 FB_{17}	—	March 16, 2016	Haleakala	Pan-STARRS 1	H	410 m	MPC · JPL
696210	2016 FQ_{17}	—	March 30, 2016	Cerro Paranal	Altmann, M., Prusti, T.	·	880 m	MPC · JPL
696211	2016 FR_{17}	—	August 9, 2013	Haleakala	Pan-STARRS 1	·	1.0 km	MPC · JPL
696212	2016 FH_{19}	—	January 8, 2016	Haleakala	Pan-STARRS 1	·	1.2 km	MPC · JPL
696213	2016 FE_{21}	—	May 24, 2011	Haleakala	Pan-STARRS 1	·	2.7 km	MPC · JPL
696214	2016 FP_{23}	—	March 10, 2016	Haleakala	Pan-STARRS 1	·	790 m	MPC · JPL
696215	2016 FK_{26}	—	March 10, 2016	Haleakala	Pan-STARRS 1	(5)	880 m	MPC · JPL
696216	2016 FM_{26}	—	February 28, 2008	Mount Lemmon	Mount Lemmon Survey	·	1.1 km	MPC · JPL
696217	2016 FM_{30}	—	March 4, 2005	Mount Lemmon	Mount Lemmon Survey	·	2.0 km	MPC · JPL
696218	2016 FO_{30}	—	October 25, 2014	Haleakala	Pan-STARRS 1	·	1.0 km	MPC · JPL
696219	2016 FU_{37}	—	November 6, 2010	Mount Lemmon	Mount Lemmon Survey	(5)	750 m	MPC · JPL
696220	2016 FJ_{41}	—	March 10, 2005	Catalina	CSS	·	1.1 km	MPC · JPL
696221	2016 FS_{43}	—	November 20, 2014	Haleakala	Pan-STARRS 1	·	2.5 km	MPC · JPL
696222	2016 FY_{45}	—	October 10, 2007	Kitt Peak	Spacewatch	·	730 m	MPC · JPL
696223	2016 FX_{50}	—	February 20, 2009	Kitt Peak	Spacewatch	·	630 m	MPC · JPL
696224	2016 FJ_{53}	—	October 22, 2003	Kitt Peak	Spacewatch	V	580 m	MPC · JPL
696225	2016 FA_{55}	—	March 6, 2016	Haleakala	Pan-STARRS 1	·	690 m	MPC · JPL
696226	2016 FW_{60}	—	September 15, 2014	Mount Lemmon	Mount Lemmon Survey	H	400 m	MPC · JPL
696227	2016 FJ_{61}	—	March 17, 2016	Haleakala	Pan-STARRS 1	H	450 m	MPC · JPL
696228	2016 FN_{61}	—	March 16, 2016	Haleakala	Pan-STARRS 1	H	370 m	MPC · JPL
696229	2016 FS_{64}	—	March 18, 2016	Haleakala	Pan-STARRS 1	·	1.4 km	MPC · JPL
696230	2016 FX_{64}	—	March 16, 2016	Haleakala	Pan-STARRS 1	·	800 m	MPC · JPL
696231	2016 FD_{68}	—	January 29, 2011	Mount Lemmon	Mount Lemmon Survey	·	960 m	MPC · JPL
696232	2016 FB_{70}	—	March 16, 2016	Haleakala	Pan-STARRS 1	·	840 m	MPC · JPL
696233	2016 FO_{71}	—	March 17, 2016	Mount Lemmon	Mount Lemmon Survey	V	450 m	MPC · JPL
696234	2016 FE_{75}	—	March 16, 2016	Haleakala	Pan-STARRS 1	·	840 m	MPC · JPL
696235	2016 FH_{75}	—	March 31, 2016	Haleakala	Pan-STARRS 1	MAR	800 m	MPC · JPL
696236	2016 FX_{80}	—	March 18, 2016	Mount Lemmon	Mount Lemmon Survey	·	920 m	MPC · JPL
696237	2016 FH_{81}	—	March 17, 2016	Haleakala	Pan-STARRS 1	·	850 m	MPC · JPL
696238	2016 FM_{83}	—	December 2, 2010	Kitt Peak	Spacewatch	·	1.1 km	MPC · JPL
696239	2016 FA_{85}	—	October 30, 2005	Kitt Peak	Spacewatch	·	900 m	MPC · JPL
696240	2016 FM_{96}	—	March 28, 2016	Cerro Tololo	DECam	·	970 m	MPC · JPL
696241	2016 GR_{1}	—	December 21, 2014	Mount Lemmon	Mount Lemmon Survey	·	3.0 km	MPC · JPL
696242	2016 GS_{1}	—	March 11, 2016	Haleakala	Pan-STARRS 1	H	420 m	MPC · JPL
696243	2016 GF_{5}	—	September 14, 2007	Kitt Peak	Spacewatch	·	2.6 km	MPC · JPL
696244	2016 GV_{8}	—	September 26, 2009	Kitt Peak	Spacewatch	·	820 m	MPC · JPL
696245	2016 GO_{13}	—	March 11, 2016	Haleakala	Pan-STARRS 1	·	960 m	MPC · JPL
696246	2016 GS_{13}	—	March 10, 2016	Haleakala	Pan-STARRS 1	·	770 m	MPC · JPL
696247	2016 GA_{23}	—	August 10, 2013	Kitt Peak	Spacewatch	·	850 m	MPC · JPL
696248	2016 GL_{25}	—	February 2, 2008	Kitt Peak	Spacewatch	·	930 m	MPC · JPL
696249	2016 GK_{32}	—	April 1, 2008	Kitt Peak	Spacewatch	·	880 m	MPC · JPL
696250	2016 GX_{32}	—	March 15, 2012	Mount Lemmon	Mount Lemmon Survey	·	910 m	MPC · JPL
696251	2016 GO_{33}	—	March 11, 2007	Mount Lemmon	Mount Lemmon Survey	·	1.4 km	MPC · JPL
696252	2016 GW_{33}	—	July 12, 2005	Mount Lemmon	Mount Lemmon Survey	NYS	800 m	MPC · JPL
696253	2016 GA_{40}	—	February 17, 2010	Kitt Peak	Spacewatch	·	2.8 km	MPC · JPL
696254	2016 GE_{41}	—	October 8, 2002	Kitt Peak	Spacewatch	·	2.3 km	MPC · JPL
696255	2016 GS_{51}	—	January 23, 2011	Mount Lemmon	Mount Lemmon Survey	·	1.1 km	MPC · JPL
696256	2016 GZ_{52}	—	December 24, 2014	Mount Lemmon	Mount Lemmon Survey	·	1.2 km	MPC · JPL
696257	2016 GN_{55}	—	March 10, 2016	Haleakala	Pan-STARRS 1	3:2 · SHU	3.7 km	MPC · JPL
696258	2016 GO_{59}	—	March 2, 2016	Haleakala	Pan-STARRS 1	·	2.5 km	MPC · JPL
696259	2016 GA_{60}	—	September 27, 2006	Kitt Peak	Spacewatch	·	990 m	MPC · JPL
696260	2016 GM_{60}	—	March 26, 2008	Mount Lemmon	Mount Lemmon Survey	3:2	4.2 km	MPC · JPL
696261	2016 GX_{61}	—	March 9, 2005	Kitt Peak	Spacewatch	·	760 m	MPC · JPL
696262	2016 GN_{62}	—	March 10, 2016	Haleakala	Pan-STARRS 1	·	2.8 km	MPC · JPL
696263	2016 GB_{69}	—	February 6, 2010	Kitt Peak	Spacewatch	·	3.1 km	MPC · JPL
696264	2016 GF_{71}	—	March 28, 2016	Mount Lemmon	Mount Lemmon Survey	PHO	710 m	MPC · JPL
696265	2016 GZ_{73}	—	April 1, 2016	Haleakala	Pan-STARRS 1	·	820 m	MPC · JPL
696266	2016 GL_{74}	—	October 10, 2007	Kitt Peak	Spacewatch	·	2.6 km	MPC · JPL
696267	2016 GD_{75}	—	November 26, 2010	Mount Lemmon	Mount Lemmon Survey	(5)	780 m	MPC · JPL
696268	2016 GW_{75}	—	September 14, 2007	Mount Lemmon	Mount Lemmon Survey	·	620 m	MPC · JPL
696269	2016 GQ_{86}	—	June 9, 2012	Mount Lemmon	Mount Lemmon Survey	·	1.6 km	MPC · JPL
696270	2016 GX_{87}	—	March 10, 2016	Haleakala	Pan-STARRS 1	VER	2.3 km	MPC · JPL
696271	2016 GZ_{92}	—	March 13, 2010	Kitt Peak	Spacewatch	·	2.4 km	MPC · JPL
696272	2016 GP_{97}	—	April 1, 2016	Mount Lemmon	Mount Lemmon Survey	·	800 m	MPC · JPL
696273	2016 GG_{102}	—	September 13, 2005	Kitt Peak	Spacewatch	·	840 m	MPC · JPL
696274	2016 GS_{102}	—	December 29, 2014	Haleakala	Pan-STARRS 1	·	1.0 km	MPC · JPL
696275	2016 GT_{107}	—	March 17, 2012	Mount Lemmon	Mount Lemmon Survey	·	1.1 km	MPC · JPL
696276	2016 GK_{109}	—	November 21, 2014	Haleakala	Pan-STARRS 1	MAR	670 m	MPC · JPL
696277	2016 GU_{110}	—	March 29, 2012	Kitt Peak	Spacewatch	·	980 m	MPC · JPL
696278	2016 GE_{112}	—	March 13, 2016	Haleakala	Pan-STARRS 1	·	640 m	MPC · JPL
696279	2016 GG_{118}	—	February 10, 2008	Mount Lemmon	Mount Lemmon Survey	·	910 m	MPC · JPL
696280	2016 GG_{122}	—	January 31, 2006	Kitt Peak	Spacewatch	·	480 m	MPC · JPL
696281	2016 GC_{125}	—	December 31, 1999	Kitt Peak	Spacewatch	·	900 m	MPC · JPL
696282	2016 GG_{126}	—	March 3, 2009	Kitt Peak	Spacewatch	BAP	710 m	MPC · JPL
696283	2016 GD_{128}	—	June 13, 2010	Mount Lemmon	Mount Lemmon Survey	·	540 m	MPC · JPL
696284	2016 GB_{131}	—	September 25, 2013	Mount Lemmon	Mount Lemmon Survey	·	870 m	MPC · JPL
696285	2016 GG_{131}	—	March 21, 2012	Mount Lemmon	Mount Lemmon Survey	·	1.1 km	MPC · JPL
696286	2016 GH_{133}	—	December 15, 2014	Haleakala	Pan-STARRS 1	·	1.1 km	MPC · JPL
696287	2016 GZ_{133}	—	March 17, 2016	Haleakala	Pan-STARRS 1	·	1.1 km	MPC · JPL
696288	2016 GA_{134}	—	March 13, 2016	Haleakala	Pan-STARRS 1	H	370 m	MPC · JPL
696289	2016 GV_{134}	—	November 17, 2014	Haleakala	Pan-STARRS 1	H	400 m	MPC · JPL
696290	2016 GK_{138}	—	December 19, 2007	Kitt Peak	Spacewatch	·	750 m	MPC · JPL
696291	2016 GS_{139}	—	March 10, 2016	Haleakala	Pan-STARRS 1	MAR	800 m	MPC · JPL
696292	2016 GS_{140}	—	April 1, 2016	Haleakala	Pan-STARRS 1	HNS	730 m	MPC · JPL
696293	2016 GV_{155}	—	November 20, 2008	Kitt Peak	Spacewatch	·	3.0 km	MPC · JPL
696294	2016 GZ_{155}	—	February 9, 2016	Haleakala	Pan-STARRS 1	·	1.0 km	MPC · JPL
696295	2016 GM_{158}	—	March 23, 2012	Kitt Peak	Spacewatch	·	1.2 km	MPC · JPL
696296	2016 GX_{165}	—	November 20, 2014	Haleakala	Pan-STARRS 1	V	540 m	MPC · JPL
696297	2016 GF_{168}	—	February 11, 2016	Haleakala	Pan-STARRS 1	KON	1.6 km	MPC · JPL
696298	2016 GW_{169}	—	April 3, 2016	Haleakala	Pan-STARRS 1	·	790 m	MPC · JPL
696299	2016 GC_{171}	—	September 24, 2013	Haleakala	Pan-STARRS 1	·	1.1 km	MPC · JPL
696300	2016 GL_{171}	—	December 30, 2007	Kitt Peak	Spacewatch	·	3.6 km	MPC · JPL

== 696301–696400 ==
back to top

Designation			Discovery			Properties		Ref
Permanent	Provisional	Named after	Date	Site	Discoverer(s)	Category	Diam.	Ref
696301	2016 GT_{172}	—	April 3, 2016	Haleakala	Pan-STARRS 1	·	710 m	MPC · JPL
696302	2016 GD_{174}	—	November 30, 2011	Mount Lemmon	Mount Lemmon Survey	L4	6.7 km	MPC · JPL
696303	2016 GN_{178}	—	April 20, 2009	Kitt Peak	Spacewatch	V	620 m	MPC · JPL
696304	2016 GD_{180}	—	September 1, 2013	Haleakala	Pan-STARRS 1	·	710 m	MPC · JPL
696305	2016 GE_{182}	—	March 31, 2016	Haleakala	Pan-STARRS 1	·	830 m	MPC · JPL
696306	2016 GP_{182}	—	November 15, 2007	Mount Lemmon	Mount Lemmon Survey	·	3.9 km	MPC · JPL
696307	2016 GB_{187}	—	March 31, 2016	Haleakala	Pan-STARRS 1	·	840 m	MPC · JPL
696308	2016 GF_{192}	—	April 3, 2016	Haleakala	Pan-STARRS 1	·	1.1 km	MPC · JPL
696309	2016 GM_{195}	—	March 11, 2016	Haleakala	Pan-STARRS 1	·	2.3 km	MPC · JPL
696310	2016 GD_{198}	—	December 13, 2014	Haleakala	Pan-STARRS 1	·	740 m	MPC · JPL
696311	2016 GM_{203}	—	October 24, 2013	Mount Lemmon	Mount Lemmon Survey	·	2.5 km	MPC · JPL
696312	2016 GW_{204}	—	October 29, 2005	Kitt Peak	Spacewatch	·	1.0 km	MPC · JPL
696313	2016 GP_{205}	—	May 19, 2005	Palomar	NEAT	PHO	1.1 km	MPC · JPL
696314	2016 GN_{206}	—	April 5, 2016	Haleakala	Pan-STARRS 1	APO	330 m	MPC · JPL
696315 Petraios	2016 GR_{206}	Petraios	April 4, 2016	Mount Lemmon	Mount Lemmon Survey	centaur	80 km	MPC · JPL
696316	2016 GV_{207}	—	January 20, 2009	Mount Lemmon	Mount Lemmon Survey	·	680 m	MPC · JPL
696317	2016 GV_{211}	—	March 4, 2016	Haleakala	Pan-STARRS 1	·	950 m	MPC · JPL
696318	2016 GD_{213}	—	October 3, 2013	Mount Lemmon	Mount Lemmon Survey	·	1.9 km	MPC · JPL
696319	2016 GD_{217}	—	November 24, 2008	Kitt Peak	Spacewatch	·	3.1 km	MPC · JPL
696320	2016 GJ_{219}	—	April 11, 2016	Haleakala	Pan-STARRS 1	·	520 m	MPC · JPL
696321	2016 GZ_{223}	—	April 28, 2012	Mount Lemmon	Mount Lemmon Survey	EUN	740 m	MPC · JPL
696322	2016 GM_{226}	—	April 13, 2016	Mount Lemmon	Mount Lemmon Survey	·	730 m	MPC · JPL
696323	2016 GW_{230}	—	April 2, 2009	Kitt Peak	Spacewatch	·	650 m	MPC · JPL
696324	2016 GY_{233}	—	March 23, 2003	Apache Point	SDSS Collaboration	·	1.2 km	MPC · JPL
696325	2016 GX_{241}	—	March 12, 2005	Kitt Peak	Deep Ecliptic Survey	·	800 m	MPC · JPL
696326	2016 GD_{247}	—	February 10, 2016	Haleakala	Pan-STARRS 1	·	860 m	MPC · JPL
696327	2016 GN_{247}	—	August 31, 2013	Haleakala	Pan-STARRS 1	·	710 m	MPC · JPL
696328	2016 GT_{247}	—	November 16, 2006	Kitt Peak	Spacewatch	MAS	790 m	MPC · JPL
696329	2016 GS_{252}	—	April 15, 2016	Haleakala	Pan-STARRS 1	H	460 m	MPC · JPL
696330	2016 GD_{253}	—	February 8, 2013	Haleakala	Pan-STARRS 1	H	380 m	MPC · JPL
696331	2016 GJ_{253}	—	April 2, 2016	Haleakala	Pan-STARRS 1	H	460 m	MPC · JPL
696332	2016 GL_{253}	—	April 2, 2016	Haleakala	Pan-STARRS 1	H	350 m	MPC · JPL
696333	2016 GC_{259}	—	April 10, 2016	Haleakala	Pan-STARRS 1	EUN	730 m	MPC · JPL
696334	2016 GU_{259}	—	April 1, 2016	Haleakala	Pan-STARRS 1	·	970 m	MPC · JPL
696335	2016 GA_{262}	—	April 1, 2016	Haleakala	Pan-STARRS 1	·	1.0 km	MPC · JPL
696336	2016 GV_{263}	—	April 4, 2016	Haleakala	Pan-STARRS 1	·	980 m	MPC · JPL
696337	2016 GB_{264}	—	April 5, 2016	Haleakala	Pan-STARRS 1	·	690 m	MPC · JPL
696338	2016 GW_{264}	—	March 14, 2007	Kitt Peak	Spacewatch	·	1.2 km	MPC · JPL
696339	2016 GP_{265}	—	April 10, 2016	Haleakala	Pan-STARRS 1	MAR	660 m	MPC · JPL
696340	2016 GP_{266}	—	December 11, 2010	Kitt Peak	Spacewatch	·	830 m	MPC · JPL
696341	2016 GD_{267}	—	April 12, 2016	Haleakala	Pan-STARRS 1	·	800 m	MPC · JPL
696342	2016 GF_{268}	—	April 14, 2016	Mount Lemmon	Mount Lemmon Survey	·	1.4 km	MPC · JPL
696343	2016 GJ_{269}	—	April 15, 2016	Haleakala	Pan-STARRS 1	EOS	1.3 km	MPC · JPL
696344	2016 GQ_{271}	—	October 2, 2014	Haleakala	Pan-STARRS 1	H	400 m	MPC · JPL
696345	2016 GV_{278}	—	April 14, 2016	Haleakala	Pan-STARRS 1	·	850 m	MPC · JPL
696346	2016 GK_{280}	—	April 14, 2016	Haleakala	Pan-STARRS 1	·	910 m	MPC · JPL
696347	2016 GM_{280}	—	April 5, 2016	Haleakala	Pan-STARRS 1	·	690 m	MPC · JPL
696348	2016 GS_{280}	—	April 12, 2016	Haleakala	Pan-STARRS 1	·	910 m	MPC · JPL
696349	2016 GL_{281}	—	April 15, 2016	Haleakala	Pan-STARRS 1	·	820 m	MPC · JPL
696350	2016 GM_{281}	—	April 12, 2016	Haleakala	Pan-STARRS 1	·	990 m	MPC · JPL
696351	2016 GR_{281}	—	April 10, 2016	Haleakala	Pan-STARRS 1	·	950 m	MPC · JPL
696352	2016 GH_{283}	—	April 14, 2016	Haleakala	Pan-STARRS 1	·	840 m	MPC · JPL
696353	2016 GM_{283}	—	April 11, 2016	Haleakala	Pan-STARRS 1	HNS	930 m	MPC · JPL
696354	2016 GN_{284}	—	April 3, 2016	Haleakala	Pan-STARRS 1	·	490 m	MPC · JPL
696355	2016 GE_{285}	—	April 1, 2016	Haleakala	Pan-STARRS 1	·	840 m	MPC · JPL
696356	2016 GE_{288}	—	April 9, 2016	Haleakala	Pan-STARRS 1	·	520 m	MPC · JPL
696357	2016 GK_{289}	—	April 12, 2016	Haleakala	Pan-STARRS 1	·	880 m	MPC · JPL
696358	2016 GE_{290}	—	April 3, 2016	Haleakala	Pan-STARRS 1	·	560 m	MPC · JPL
696359	2016 GT_{290}	—	April 9, 2016	Haleakala	Pan-STARRS 1	·	840 m	MPC · JPL
696360	2016 GP_{291}	—	April 11, 2016	Haleakala	Pan-STARRS 1	H	320 m	MPC · JPL
696361	2016 GK_{301}	—	April 12, 2016	Haleakala	Pan-STARRS 1	·	1.4 km	MPC · JPL
696362	2016 GY_{304}	—	April 12, 2016	Haleakala	Pan-STARRS 1	·	960 m	MPC · JPL
696363	2016 GQ_{307}	—	April 2, 2016	Mount Lemmon	Mount Lemmon Survey	·	1.1 km	MPC · JPL
696364	2016 GG_{310}	—	April 14, 2016	Haleakala	Pan-STARRS 1	·	930 m	MPC · JPL
696365	2016 GY_{311}	—	April 1, 2016	Haleakala	Pan-STARRS 1	EUN	1.0 km	MPC · JPL
696366	2016 GB_{317}	—	September 3, 2013	Haleakala	Pan-STARRS 1	·	970 m	MPC · JPL
696367	2016 GC_{317}	—	April 15, 2016	Mount Lemmon	Mount Lemmon Survey	·	630 m	MPC · JPL
696368	2016 GJ_{317}	—	April 4, 2016	Haleakala	Pan-STARRS 1	·	740 m	MPC · JPL
696369	2016 GY_{345}	—	April 2, 2016	Haleakala	Pan-STARRS 1	·	1.1 km	MPC · JPL
696370	2016 GO_{346}	—	April 3, 2016	Haleakala	Pan-STARRS 1	·	1.0 km	MPC · JPL
696371	2016 HH_{2}	—	October 4, 2006	Mount Lemmon	Mount Lemmon Survey	·	340 m	MPC · JPL
696372	2016 HC_{10}	—	October 22, 2012	Piszkés-tető	K. Sárneczky, A. Király	HYG	2.9 km	MPC · JPL
696373	2016 HG_{10}	—	April 3, 2016	Haleakala	Pan-STARRS 1	MAR	780 m	MPC · JPL
696374	2016 HR_{13}	—	August 15, 2013	Haleakala	Pan-STARRS 1	·	850 m	MPC · JPL
696375	2016 HW_{14}	—	November 26, 2014	Haleakala	Pan-STARRS 1	MAR	660 m	MPC · JPL
696376	2016 HG_{15}	—	April 20, 2012	Mount Lemmon	Mount Lemmon Survey	MAR	580 m	MPC · JPL
696377	2016 HC_{18}	—	April 5, 2016	Haleakala	Pan-STARRS 1	·	800 m	MPC · JPL
696378	2016 HE_{20}	—	April 5, 2016	Haleakala	Pan-STARRS 1	·	870 m	MPC · JPL
696379	2016 HQ_{21}	—	April 30, 2016	Mount Lemmon	Mount Lemmon Survey	KON	1.6 km	MPC · JPL
696380	2016 HR_{22}	—	August 25, 2004	Kitt Peak	Spacewatch	·	960 m	MPC · JPL
696381	2016 HC_{25}	—	December 17, 2007	Mount Lemmon	Mount Lemmon Survey	·	3.2 km	MPC · JPL
696382	2016 HP_{29}	—	April 30, 2016	Haleakala	Pan-STARRS 1	·	2.3 km	MPC · JPL
696383	2016 HD_{30}	—	April 16, 2016	Haleakala	Pan-STARRS 1	·	780 m	MPC · JPL
696384	2016 HR_{33}	—	April 27, 2016	Haleakala	Pan-STARRS 1	·	1.1 km	MPC · JPL
696385	2016 HH_{36}	—	April 30, 2016	Haleakala	Pan-STARRS 1	·	780 m	MPC · JPL
696386	2016 HB_{40}	—	April 14, 2010	Mount Lemmon	Mount Lemmon Survey	·	2.2 km	MPC · JPL
696387	2016 HR_{44}	—	April 30, 2016	Haleakala	Pan-STARRS 1	(5)	900 m	MPC · JPL
696388	2016 JG_{1}	—	July 13, 2013	Haleakala	Pan-STARRS 1	·	1.3 km	MPC · JPL
696389	2016 JO_{7}	—	May 2, 2016	Mount Lemmon	Mount Lemmon Survey	·	850 m	MPC · JPL
696390	2016 JP_{10}	—	March 14, 2015	Haleakala	Pan-STARRS 1	·	2.6 km	MPC · JPL
696391	2016 JP_{13}	—	April 11, 2016	Haleakala	Pan-STARRS 1	MAR	570 m	MPC · JPL
696392	2016 JR_{14}	—	April 27, 2012	Mount Lemmon	Mount Lemmon Survey	HNS	1 km	MPC · JPL
696393	2016 JS_{21}	—	May 7, 2016	Haleakala	Pan-STARRS 1	·	1.1 km	MPC · JPL
696394	2016 JR_{27}	—	February 21, 2012	Kitt Peak	Spacewatch	·	990 m	MPC · JPL
696395	2016 JM_{31}	—	May 20, 2012	Mount Lemmon	Mount Lemmon Survey	·	1 km	MPC · JPL
696396	2016 JS_{32}	—	December 26, 2005	Kitt Peak	Spacewatch	·	1.9 km	MPC · JPL
696397	2016 JR_{34}	—	March 1, 2009	Catalina	CSS	PHO	690 m	MPC · JPL
696398	2016 JN_{45}	—	May 5, 2016	Haleakala	Pan-STARRS 1	KON	1.4 km	MPC · JPL
696399	2016 JD_{46}	—	May 2, 2016	Mount Lemmon	Mount Lemmon Survey	·	720 m	MPC · JPL
696400	2016 JK_{46}	—	May 6, 2016	Haleakala	Pan-STARRS 1	·	980 m	MPC · JPL

== 696401–696500 ==
back to top

Designation			Discovery			Properties		Ref
Permanent	Provisional	Named after	Date	Site	Discoverer(s)	Category	Diam.	Ref
696401	2016 JT_{47}	—	May 6, 2016	Haleakala	Pan-STARRS 1	MAR	900 m	MPC · JPL
696402	2016 JU_{47}	—	May 3, 2016	Mount Lemmon	Mount Lemmon Survey	·	800 m	MPC · JPL
696403	2016 JV_{48}	—	May 7, 2016	Haleakala	Pan-STARRS 1	EUN	750 m	MPC · JPL
696404	2016 JB_{49}	—	May 2, 2016	Mount Lemmon	Mount Lemmon Survey	KON	1.7 km	MPC · JPL
696405	2016 JQ_{56}	—	May 1, 2016	Haleakala	Pan-STARRS 1	·	750 m	MPC · JPL
696406	2016 JF_{57}	—	May 1, 2016	Haleakala	Pan-STARRS 1	·	900 m	MPC · JPL
696407	2016 JT_{73}	—	May 7, 2016	Haleakala	Pan-STARRS 1	·	1.3 km	MPC · JPL
696408	2016 JR_{74}	—	April 30, 2016	Haleakala	Pan-STARRS 1	·	1.0 km	MPC · JPL
696409	2016 KK_{4}	—	May 30, 2016	Haleakala	Pan-STARRS 1	H	470 m	MPC · JPL
696410	2016 KQ_{5}	—	May 27, 2016	Haleakala	Pan-STARRS 1	·	940 m	MPC · JPL
696411	2016 KV_{5}	—	May 30, 2016	Haleakala	Pan-STARRS 1	·	770 m	MPC · JPL
696412	2016 KL_{6}	—	September 16, 2012	Kitt Peak	Spacewatch	·	1.4 km	MPC · JPL
696413	2016 KK_{11}	—	May 30, 2016	Haleakala	Pan-STARRS 1	TIN	830 m	MPC · JPL
696414	2016 KD_{12}	—	May 30, 2016	Haleakala	Pan-STARRS 1	·	670 m	MPC · JPL
696415	2016 LK_{3}	—	September 5, 2013	Kitt Peak	Spacewatch	V	590 m	MPC · JPL
696416	2016 LL_{5}	—	January 14, 2015	Haleakala	Pan-STARRS 1	·	3.6 km	MPC · JPL
696417	2016 LX_{6}	—	February 18, 2015	Mount Lemmon	Mount Lemmon Survey	·	1.5 km	MPC · JPL
696418	2016 LS_{14}	—	October 5, 2003	Kitt Peak	Spacewatch	H	320 m	MPC · JPL
696419	2016 LL_{15}	—	February 10, 2015	Mount Lemmon	Mount Lemmon Survey	·	1.1 km	MPC · JPL
696420	2016 LJ_{17}	—	October 25, 2013	Mount Lemmon	Mount Lemmon Survey	HNS	700 m	MPC · JPL
696421	2016 LM_{20}	—	January 15, 2015	Haleakala	Pan-STARRS 1	·	760 m	MPC · JPL
696422	2016 LG_{21}	—	November 9, 2013	Haleakala	Pan-STARRS 1	·	930 m	MPC · JPL
696423	2016 LD_{22}	—	May 2, 2016	Haleakala	Pan-STARRS 1	·	1.2 km	MPC · JPL
696424	2016 LR_{22}	—	June 16, 2012	Mount Lemmon	Mount Lemmon Survey	·	1.1 km	MPC · JPL
696425	2016 LS_{23}	—	September 6, 2013	Kitt Peak	Spacewatch	·	1.2 km	MPC · JPL
696426	2016 LU_{23}	—	May 2, 2016	Haleakala	Pan-STARRS 1	·	1.2 km	MPC · JPL
696427	2016 LT_{25}	—	June 5, 2016	Haleakala	Pan-STARRS 1	·	1.2 km	MPC · JPL
696428	2016 LN_{26}	—	February 12, 2008	Kitt Peak	Spacewatch	·	1.0 km	MPC · JPL
696429	2016 LB_{27}	—	January 12, 2015	Haleakala	Pan-STARRS 1	HNS	910 m	MPC · JPL
696430	2016 LC_{28}	—	October 5, 2000	Haleakala	NEAT	·	1.4 km	MPC · JPL
696431	2016 LD_{30}	—	November 26, 2003	Kitt Peak	Spacewatch	V	530 m	MPC · JPL
696432	2016 LH_{31}	—	June 5, 2016	Haleakala	Pan-STARRS 1	·	1.4 km	MPC · JPL
696433	2016 LC_{32}	—	June 5, 2016	Haleakala	Pan-STARRS 1	·	910 m	MPC · JPL
696434	2016 LJ_{33}	—	January 20, 2015	Haleakala	Pan-STARRS 1	·	960 m	MPC · JPL
696435	2016 LR_{35}	—	January 22, 2015	Haleakala	Pan-STARRS 1	·	820 m	MPC · JPL
696436	2016 LA_{37}	—	December 20, 2014	Haleakala	Pan-STARRS 1	HNS	870 m	MPC · JPL
696437	2016 LW_{38}	—	November 28, 2013	Haleakala	Pan-STARRS 1	526	2.0 km	MPC · JPL
696438	2016 LG_{40}	—	May 30, 2016	Haleakala	Pan-STARRS 1	KON	1.9 km	MPC · JPL
696439	2016 LH_{40}	—	March 27, 2012	Kitt Peak	Spacewatch	·	1.0 km	MPC · JPL
696440	2016 LM_{40}	—	February 1, 2006	Kitt Peak	Spacewatch	·	1.2 km	MPC · JPL
696441	2016 LO_{40}	—	November 6, 2013	Haleakala	Pan-STARRS 1	·	910 m	MPC · JPL
696442	2016 LO_{46}	—	June 2, 2016	Mount Lemmon	Mount Lemmon Survey	·	800 m	MPC · JPL
696443	2016 LQ_{48}	—	May 2, 2006	Mount Lemmon	Mount Lemmon Survey	H	620 m	MPC · JPL
696444	2016 LT_{49}	—	June 11, 2016	Haleakala	Pan-STARRS 1	·	1.2 km	MPC · JPL
696445	2016 LA_{53}	—	June 3, 2016	Haleakala	Pan-STARRS 1	H	430 m	MPC · JPL
696446	2016 LN_{55}	—	June 8, 2016	Haleakala	Pan-STARRS 1	·	1.3 km	MPC · JPL
696447	2016 LV_{55}	—	August 28, 2003	Palomar	NEAT	·	1.4 km	MPC · JPL
696448	2016 LG_{57}	—	December 31, 2008	Calvin-Rehoboth	L. A. Molnar	·	1.8 km	MPC · JPL
696449	2016 LJ_{57}	—	October 17, 2012	Mount Lemmon	Mount Lemmon Survey	·	1.6 km	MPC · JPL
696450	2016 LL_{57}	—	July 18, 2007	Mount Lemmon	Mount Lemmon Survey	·	1.5 km	MPC · JPL
696451	2016 LK_{58}	—	October 10, 2012	Haleakala	Pan-STARRS 1	·	1.8 km	MPC · JPL
696452	2016 LO_{58}	—	June 3, 2016	Mount Lemmon	Mount Lemmon Survey	·	1.2 km	MPC · JPL
696453	2016 LT_{58}	—	March 11, 2005	Mount Lemmon	Mount Lemmon Survey	·	1.8 km	MPC · JPL
696454	2016 LF_{61}	—	October 25, 2008	Kitt Peak	Spacewatch	·	1.4 km	MPC · JPL
696455	2016 LJ_{62}	—	October 14, 2012	ESA OGS	ESA OGS	·	1.6 km	MPC · JPL
696456	2016 LM_{63}	—	May 18, 2015	Mount Lemmon	Mount Lemmon Survey	·	1.7 km	MPC · JPL
696457	2016 LU_{64}	—	January 20, 2015	Haleakala	Pan-STARRS 1	JUN	870 m	MPC · JPL
696458	2016 LD_{69}	—	June 10, 2016	Haleakala	Pan-STARRS 1	MAR	900 m	MPC · JPL
696459	2016 LO_{69}	—	June 2, 2016	Haleakala	Pan-STARRS 1	(116763)	2.1 km	MPC · JPL
696460	2016 LD_{70}	—	June 5, 2016	Haleakala	Pan-STARRS 1	EUN	870 m	MPC · JPL
696461	2016 LO_{71}	—	June 2, 2016	Mount Lemmon	Mount Lemmon Survey	·	980 m	MPC · JPL
696462	2016 LT_{71}	—	July 8, 2003	Palomar	NEAT	·	1.6 km	MPC · JPL
696463	2016 LK_{72}	—	June 21, 2007	Mount Lemmon	Mount Lemmon Survey	·	1.3 km	MPC · JPL
696464	2016 LW_{76}	—	June 12, 2016	Mount Lemmon	Mount Lemmon Survey	·	920 m	MPC · JPL
696465	2016 LO_{77}	—	June 8, 2016	Haleakala	Pan-STARRS 1	·	1.6 km	MPC · JPL
696466	2016 LT_{77}	—	June 15, 2016	Mount Lemmon	Mount Lemmon Survey	·	1.0 km	MPC · JPL
696467	2016 LV_{77}	—	June 4, 2016	Mount Lemmon	Mount Lemmon Survey	EUN	890 m	MPC · JPL
696468	2016 LS_{78}	—	June 12, 2016	Mount Lemmon	Mount Lemmon Survey	MAR	720 m	MPC · JPL
696469	2016 LF_{81}	—	June 4, 2016	Haleakala	Pan-STARRS 1	·	1.3 km	MPC · JPL
696470	2016 LB_{82}	—	June 8, 2016	Haleakala	Pan-STARRS 1	·	820 m	MPC · JPL
696471	2016 LE_{91}	—	June 8, 2016	Mount Lemmon	Mount Lemmon Survey	EUN	940 m	MPC · JPL
696472	2016 LV_{95}	—	June 3, 2016	Haleakala	Pan-STARRS 1	(194)	1.2 km	MPC · JPL
696473	2016 LY_{95}	—	June 8, 2016	Haleakala	Pan-STARRS 1	·	1.3 km	MPC · JPL
696474	2016 LN_{101}	—	June 8, 2016	Haleakala	Pan-STARRS 1	·	1.5 km	MPC · JPL
696475	2016 LU_{101}	—	June 5, 2016	Haleakala	Pan-STARRS 1	·	800 m	MPC · JPL
696476	2016 MU	—	January 22, 2015	Haleakala	Pan-STARRS 1	·	1.2 km	MPC · JPL
696477	2016 MU_{1}	—	March 4, 2016	Haleakala	Pan-STARRS 1	·	1.1 km	MPC · JPL
696478	2016 MT_{3}	—	June 29, 2016	Haleakala	Pan-STARRS 1	·	1.4 km	MPC · JPL
696479	2016 MW_{3}	—	June 16, 2016	Haleakala	Pan-STARRS 1	·	1.3 km	MPC · JPL
696480	2016 ML_{4}	—	August 25, 2012	Catalina	CSS	EUN	1.0 km	MPC · JPL
696481	2016 MH_{6}	—	June 29, 2016	Haleakala	Pan-STARRS 1	·	2.3 km	MPC · JPL
696482	2016 MO_{6}	—	June 28, 2016	Haleakala	Pan-STARRS 1	·	970 m	MPC · JPL
696483	2016 MT_{7}	—	June 28, 2016	Haleakala	Pan-STARRS 1	·	1.2 km	MPC · JPL
696484	2016 NU_{1}	—	June 11, 2012	Haleakala	Pan-STARRS 1	·	1.2 km	MPC · JPL
696485	2016 NR_{3}	—	September 12, 2012	Andrushivka	Y. Ivaščenko, Kyrylenko, P.	·	1.5 km	MPC · JPL
696486	2016 NP_{4}	—	June 8, 2016	Haleakala	Pan-STARRS 1	·	1.8 km	MPC · JPL
696487	2016 NF_{5}	—	July 3, 2016	Atom Site	Space Surveillance Telescope	·	1.6 km	MPC · JPL
696488	2016 NS_{7}	—	August 30, 2005	Kitt Peak	Spacewatch	·	1.2 km	MPC · JPL
696489	2016 NF_{8}	—	November 12, 2013	Nogales	M. Schwartz, P. R. Holvorcem	·	1.7 km	MPC · JPL
696490	2016 NG_{9}	—	February 12, 2008	Kitt Peak	Spacewatch	·	910 m	MPC · JPL
696491	2016 NO_{12}	—	April 19, 2007	Kitt Peak	Spacewatch	·	1.1 km	MPC · JPL
696492	2016 NX_{13}	—	September 16, 2012	Catalina	CSS	ADE	1.6 km	MPC · JPL
696493	2016 NN_{19}	—	November 16, 1995	Kitt Peak	Spacewatch	·	1.2 km	MPC · JPL
696494	2016 NT_{20}	—	May 8, 2005	Kitt Peak	Spacewatch	·	1.0 km	MPC · JPL
696495	2016 NY_{20}	—	September 7, 2008	Mount Lemmon	Mount Lemmon Survey	·	1.2 km	MPC · JPL
696496	2016 NC_{24}	—	October 9, 2008	Mount Lemmon	Mount Lemmon Survey	·	1.2 km	MPC · JPL
696497	2016 NV_{26}	—	September 20, 2008	Kitt Peak	Spacewatch	·	1.3 km	MPC · JPL
696498	2016 NO_{27}	—	June 5, 2016	Haleakala	Pan-STARRS 1	EUN	860 m	MPC · JPL
696499	2016 NV_{29}	—	June 9, 2007	Kitt Peak	Spacewatch	(1547)	1.2 km	MPC · JPL
696500	2016 NR_{30}	—	January 25, 2014	Haleakala	Pan-STARRS 1	EOS	1.8 km	MPC · JPL

== 696501–696600 ==
back to top

Designation			Discovery			Properties		Ref
Permanent	Provisional	Named after	Date	Site	Discoverer(s)	Category	Diam.	Ref
696501	2016 NZ_{30}	—	November 1, 2010	Kitt Peak	Spacewatch	·	690 m	MPC · JPL
696502	2016 ND_{31}	—	August 11, 2012	Siding Spring	SSS	·	1.1 km	MPC · JPL
696503	2016 NM_{31}	—	June 17, 2016	Kitt Peak	Spacewatch	·	2.1 km	MPC · JPL
696504	2016 NC_{32}	—	July 7, 2016	Haleakala	Pan-STARRS 1	·	1.5 km	MPC · JPL
696505	2016 NN_{34}	—	December 28, 2013	Kitt Peak	Spacewatch	·	1.6 km	MPC · JPL
696506	2016 NL_{37}	—	August 20, 2008	Kitt Peak	Spacewatch	·	1.0 km	MPC · JPL
696507	2016 NN_{47}	—	April 15, 2007	Kitt Peak	Spacewatch	·	1.0 km	MPC · JPL
696508	2016 NV_{48}	—	October 20, 2012	Mount Lemmon	Mount Lemmon Survey	·	1.7 km	MPC · JPL
696509	2016 NV_{51}	—	September 18, 2012	Mount Lemmon	Mount Lemmon Survey	(12739)	1.3 km	MPC · JPL
696510	2016 NR_{52}	—	October 9, 2004	Anderson Mesa	LONEOS	·	760 m	MPC · JPL
696511	2016 NL_{53}	—	January 23, 2014	Mount Lemmon	Mount Lemmon Survey	EOS	1.5 km	MPC · JPL
696512	2016 NJ_{55}	—	February 17, 2004	Kitt Peak	Spacewatch	·	970 m	MPC · JPL
696513	2016 NL_{56}	—	July 12, 2016	Haleakala	Pan-STARRS 1	APO · PHA	230 m	MPC · JPL
696514	2016 NM_{59}	—	July 4, 2016	Haleakala	Pan-STARRS 1	·	1.5 km	MPC · JPL
696515	2016 NQ_{61}	—	July 8, 2016	Haleakala	Pan-STARRS 1	·	1.5 km	MPC · JPL
696516	2016 NS_{61}	—	September 1, 2005	Palomar	NEAT	·	2.8 km	MPC · JPL
696517	2016 NP_{62}	—	June 9, 2011	Mount Lemmon	Mount Lemmon Survey	·	1.5 km	MPC · JPL
696518	2016 ND_{63}	—	July 11, 2016	Haleakala	Pan-STARRS 1	·	1.9 km	MPC · JPL
696519	2016 NK_{65}	—	August 30, 2011	Piszkéstető	K. Sárneczky	BRA	1.4 km	MPC · JPL
696520	2016 NT_{65}	—	October 18, 2012	Haleakala	Pan-STARRS 1	·	1.4 km	MPC · JPL
696521	2016 NE_{66}	—	September 15, 2007	Kitt Peak	Spacewatch	·	1.6 km	MPC · JPL
696522	2016 NC_{68}	—	March 26, 2007	Kitt Peak	Spacewatch	·	940 m	MPC · JPL
696523	2016 ND_{71}	—	March 22, 2015	Haleakala	Pan-STARRS 1	·	1.4 km	MPC · JPL
696524	2016 NV_{71}	—	May 11, 2015	Mount Lemmon	Mount Lemmon Survey	·	1.5 km	MPC · JPL
696525	2016 NR_{72}	—	July 4, 2016	Haleakala	Pan-STARRS 1	·	1.7 km	MPC · JPL
696526	2016 NC_{73}	—	May 21, 2011	Mount Lemmon	Mount Lemmon Survey	LEO	1.5 km	MPC · JPL
696527	2016 NH_{73}	—	November 7, 2012	Kitt Peak	Spacewatch	·	1.5 km	MPC · JPL
696528	2016 NG_{74}	—	May 26, 2015	Haleakala	Pan-STARRS 1	·	1.8 km	MPC · JPL
696529	2016 NO_{74}	—	July 11, 2016	Haleakala	Pan-STARRS 1	·	1.6 km	MPC · JPL
696530	2016 NK_{75}	—	April 27, 2011	Mount Lemmon	Mount Lemmon Survey	·	1.0 km	MPC · JPL
696531	2016 NA_{76}	—	October 8, 2012	Mount Lemmon	Mount Lemmon Survey	·	1.2 km	MPC · JPL
696532	2016 ND_{76}	—	July 4, 2016	Haleakala	Pan-STARRS 1	·	1.2 km	MPC · JPL
696533	2016 NE_{76}	—	September 4, 2008	Kitt Peak	Spacewatch	·	1.2 km	MPC · JPL
696534	2016 NF_{76}	—	July 4, 2016	Haleakala	Pan-STARRS 1	·	1.3 km	MPC · JPL
696535	2016 NJ_{76}	—	August 26, 2011	Piszkéstető	K. Sárneczky	·	3.6 km	MPC · JPL
696536	2016 NU_{78}	—	October 1, 2000	Apache Point	SDSS Collaboration	·	1 km	MPC · JPL
696537	2016 ND_{79}	—	July 5, 2016	Mount Lemmon	Mount Lemmon Survey	·	1 km	MPC · JPL
696538	2016 NW_{83}	—	July 11, 2016	Haleakala	Pan-STARRS 1	·	1.5 km	MPC · JPL
696539	2016 NZ_{83}	—	May 21, 2015	Haleakala	Pan-STARRS 1	·	1.5 km	MPC · JPL
696540	2016 NX_{84}	—	October 17, 2012	Mount Lemmon	Mount Lemmon Survey	·	1.2 km	MPC · JPL
696541	2016 NS_{85}	—	March 26, 2014	Mount Lemmon	Mount Lemmon Survey	·	1.9 km	MPC · JPL
696542	2016 NC_{86}	—	July 11, 2016	Haleakala	Pan-STARRS 1	·	1.5 km	MPC · JPL
696543	2016 NL_{87}	—	August 26, 2012	Haleakala	Pan-STARRS 1	(11882)	1.2 km	MPC · JPL
696544	2016 NZ_{87}	—	July 14, 2016	Haleakala	Pan-STARRS 1	·	1.2 km	MPC · JPL
696545	2016 NF_{88}	—	October 9, 2012	Mount Lemmon	Mount Lemmon Survey	·	1.3 km	MPC · JPL
696546	2016 NV_{88}	—	October 8, 2012	Mount Lemmon	Mount Lemmon Survey	·	1.3 km	MPC · JPL
696547	2016 NQ_{89}	—	July 14, 2016	Haleakala	Pan-STARRS 1	·	1.3 km	MPC · JPL
696548	2016 NZ_{89}	—	April 25, 2015	Haleakala	Pan-STARRS 1	·	1.6 km	MPC · JPL
696549	2016 NY_{94}	—	July 11, 2016	Haleakala	Pan-STARRS 1	JUN	840 m	MPC · JPL
696550	2016 NN_{107}	—	July 14, 2016	Haleakala	Pan-STARRS 1	·	1.3 km	MPC · JPL
696551	2016 NK_{108}	—	July 5, 2016	Haleakala	Pan-STARRS 1	·	1.1 km	MPC · JPL
696552	2016 NO_{108}	—	July 14, 2016	Haleakala	Pan-STARRS 1	NYS	910 m	MPC · JPL
696553	2016 NY_{108}	—	July 5, 2016	Mount Lemmon	Mount Lemmon Survey	·	1.6 km	MPC · JPL
696554	2016 NA_{113}	—	July 4, 2016	Haleakala	Pan-STARRS 1	·	1.4 km	MPC · JPL
696555	2016 NB_{113}	—	July 11, 2016	Haleakala	Pan-STARRS 1	·	1.3 km	MPC · JPL
696556	2016 NG_{113}	—	July 5, 2016	Mount Lemmon	Mount Lemmon Survey	AGN	840 m	MPC · JPL
696557	2016 NP_{114}	—	July 7, 2016	Haleakala	Pan-STARRS 1	·	1.3 km	MPC · JPL
696558	2016 NY_{114}	—	July 8, 2016	Haleakala	Pan-STARRS 1	·	1.7 km	MPC · JPL
696559	2016 NC_{119}	—	July 14, 2016	Haleakala	Pan-STARRS 1	HOF	2.1 km	MPC · JPL
696560	2016 ND_{119}	—	July 3, 2016	Mount Lemmon	Mount Lemmon Survey	EUN	640 m	MPC · JPL
696561	2016 ND_{120}	—	July 13, 2016	Haleakala	Pan-STARRS 1	·	1.2 km	MPC · JPL
696562	2016 NM_{123}	—	July 10, 2016	Mount Lemmon	Mount Lemmon Survey	·	1.0 km	MPC · JPL
696563	2016 NL_{153}	—	July 11, 2016	Haleakala	Pan-STARRS 1	·	1.6 km	MPC · JPL
696564	2016 NS_{153}	—	July 12, 2016	Haleakala	Pan-STARRS 1	·	1.4 km	MPC · JPL
696565	2016 NX_{153}	—	July 7, 2016	Haleakala	Pan-STARRS 1	·	1.7 km	MPC · JPL
696566	2016 NC_{154}	—	July 5, 2016	Mount Lemmon	Mount Lemmon Survey	·	1.4 km	MPC · JPL
696567	2016 NH_{154}	—	July 11, 2016	Mount Lemmon	Mount Lemmon Survey	·	1.3 km	MPC · JPL
696568	2016 ND_{155}	—	July 9, 2016	Haleakala	Pan-STARRS 1	·	1.2 km	MPC · JPL
696569	2016 NP_{156}	—	July 15, 2016	Mount Lemmon	Mount Lemmon Survey	·	1.6 km	MPC · JPL
696570	2016 NX_{190}	—	July 14, 2016	Haleakala	Pan-STARRS 1	KOR	950 m	MPC · JPL
696571	2016 OD	—	July 7, 2016	Mount Lemmon	Mount Lemmon Survey	·	2.0 km	MPC · JPL
696572	2016 OP_{1}	—	July 14, 2016	Mount Lemmon	Mount Lemmon Survey	·	1.2 km	MPC · JPL
696573	2016 OE_{2}	—	March 14, 2007	Kitt Peak	Spacewatch	·	1.0 km	MPC · JPL
696574	2016 OQ_{3}	—	October 13, 2012	Haleakala	Pan-STARRS 1	·	1.4 km	MPC · JPL
696575	2016 OM_{4}	—	May 22, 2011	Mount Lemmon	Mount Lemmon Survey	·	1.4 km	MPC · JPL
696576	2016 OR_{4}	—	March 17, 2015	Haleakala	Pan-STARRS 1	·	1.9 km	MPC · JPL
696577	2016 OD_{7}	—	October 27, 2003	Kitt Peak	Spacewatch	·	1.5 km	MPC · JPL
696578	2016 ON_{8}	—	December 3, 2008	Mount Lemmon	Mount Lemmon Survey	·	1.2 km	MPC · JPL
696579	2016 OT_{8}	—	October 18, 2002	Palomar	NEAT	·	2.1 km	MPC · JPL
696580	2016 OT_{10}	—	October 25, 2011	Haleakala	Pan-STARRS 1	EOS	1.6 km	MPC · JPL
696581	2016 OU_{10}	—	July 16, 2016	Mount Lemmon	Mount Lemmon Survey	·	1.1 km	MPC · JPL
696582	2016 OE_{11}	—	July 31, 2016	Haleakala	Pan-STARRS 1	·	1.5 km	MPC · JPL
696583	2016 PW_{3}	—	May 26, 2011	Mount Lemmon	Mount Lemmon Survey	·	1.2 km	MPC · JPL
696584	2016 PZ_{4}	—	October 22, 2003	Apache Point	SDSS Collaboration	·	1.4 km	MPC · JPL
696585	2016 PF_{5}	—	October 9, 2012	Haleakala	Pan-STARRS 1	·	1.4 km	MPC · JPL
696586	2016 PN_{5}	—	August 1, 2016	Haleakala	Pan-STARRS 1	WIT	740 m	MPC · JPL
696587	2016 PT_{7}	—	February 23, 2015	Haleakala	Pan-STARRS 1	·	1.4 km	MPC · JPL
696588	2016 PY_{10}	—	January 14, 2008	Kitt Peak	Spacewatch	EOS	1.4 km	MPC · JPL
696589	2016 PL_{17}	—	August 7, 2016	Haleakala	Pan-STARRS 1	·	1.1 km	MPC · JPL
696590	2016 PV_{18}	—	November 2, 2008	Kitt Peak	Spacewatch	·	1.2 km	MPC · JPL
696591	2016 PG_{21}	—	August 1, 2016	Haleakala	Pan-STARRS 1	·	1.5 km	MPC · JPL
696592	2016 PU_{21}	—	October 1, 2008	Kitt Peak	Spacewatch	·	1.4 km	MPC · JPL
696593	2016 PQ_{24}	—	October 17, 2012	Mount Lemmon	Mount Lemmon Survey	·	1.6 km	MPC · JPL
696594	2016 PF_{25}	—	August 2, 2016	Haleakala	Pan-STARRS 1	(5)	840 m	MPC · JPL
696595	2016 PK_{25}	—	October 24, 2008	Mount Lemmon	Mount Lemmon Survey	·	1.1 km	MPC · JPL
696596	2016 PD_{29}	—	November 24, 2012	Kitt Peak	Spacewatch	·	1.7 km	MPC · JPL
696597	2016 PJ_{32}	—	May 1, 2011	Haleakala	Pan-STARRS 1	·	1.3 km	MPC · JPL
696598	2016 PH_{41}	—	August 7, 2016	Haleakala	Pan-STARRS 1	·	1.2 km	MPC · JPL
696599	2016 PH_{43}	—	October 11, 2012	Mount Lemmon	Mount Lemmon Survey	·	1.3 km	MPC · JPL
696600	2016 PA_{46}	—	September 30, 2003	Apache Point	SDSS Collaboration	·	1.4 km	MPC · JPL

== 696601–696700 ==
back to top

Designation			Discovery			Properties		Ref
Permanent	Provisional	Named after	Date	Site	Discoverer(s)	Category	Diam.	Ref
696601	2016 PT_{46}	—	August 7, 2016	Haleakala	Pan-STARRS 1	·	2.5 km	MPC · JPL
696602	2016 PJ_{52}	—	September 23, 2012	Mount Lemmon	Mount Lemmon Survey	WIT	730 m	MPC · JPL
696603	2016 PX_{52}	—	August 7, 2016	Haleakala	Pan-STARRS 1	·	1.3 km	MPC · JPL
696604	2016 PP_{55}	—	December 30, 2013	Mount Lemmon	Mount Lemmon Survey	·	1.4 km	MPC · JPL
696605	2016 PN_{56}	—	September 25, 2012	Mount Lemmon	Mount Lemmon Survey	·	1.2 km	MPC · JPL
696606	2016 PD_{60}	—	August 7, 2016	Haleakala	Pan-STARRS 1	·	1.7 km	MPC · JPL
696607	2016 PM_{61}	—	February 20, 2009	Kitt Peak	Spacewatch	·	2.2 km	MPC · JPL
696608	2016 PJ_{64}	—	October 20, 2012	Mount Lemmon	Mount Lemmon Survey	·	1.8 km	MPC · JPL
696609	2016 PT_{65}	—	August 9, 2016	Haleakala	Pan-STARRS 1	·	1.4 km	MPC · JPL
696610	2016 PC_{70}	—	August 2, 2016	Haleakala	Pan-STARRS 1	·	1.4 km	MPC · JPL
696611	2016 PF_{74}	—	August 10, 2016	Haleakala	Pan-STARRS 1	·	1.4 km	MPC · JPL
696612	2016 PS_{74}	—	August 10, 2016	Haleakala	Pan-STARRS 1	·	1.1 km	MPC · JPL
696613	2016 PD_{78}	—	January 20, 2015	Haleakala	Pan-STARRS 1	·	1.2 km	MPC · JPL
696614	2016 PJ_{78}	—	October 8, 2012	Kitt Peak	Spacewatch	·	1.7 km	MPC · JPL
696615	2016 PH_{87}	—	August 10, 2016	Haleakala	Pan-STARRS 1	·	1.5 km	MPC · JPL
696616	2016 PM_{89}	—	August 24, 2007	Kitt Peak	Spacewatch	·	1.5 km	MPC · JPL
696617	2016 PB_{93}	—	September 14, 2007	Mount Lemmon	Mount Lemmon Survey	·	1.6 km	MPC · JPL
696618	2016 PD_{93}	—	October 16, 2007	Mount Lemmon	Mount Lemmon Survey	HOF	1.9 km	MPC · JPL
696619	2016 PG_{93}	—	November 2, 2007	Mount Lemmon	Mount Lemmon Survey	·	1.4 km	MPC · JPL
696620	2016 PD_{94}	—	October 25, 2012	Kitt Peak	Spacewatch	·	1.5 km	MPC · JPL
696621	2016 PB_{95}	—	August 2, 2016	Haleakala	Pan-STARRS 1	EOS	1.3 km	MPC · JPL
696622	2016 PV_{95}	—	April 24, 2015	Haleakala	Pan-STARRS 2	·	1.5 km	MPC · JPL
696623	2016 PS_{98}	—	August 1, 2016	Haleakala	Pan-STARRS 1	·	1.6 km	MPC · JPL
696624	2016 PA_{99}	—	July 25, 2006	Mount Lemmon	Mount Lemmon Survey	·	1.9 km	MPC · JPL
696625	2016 PD_{99}	—	September 21, 2011	Mount Lemmon	Mount Lemmon Survey	BRA	1.1 km	MPC · JPL
696626	2016 PO_{99}	—	August 10, 2016	Haleakala	Pan-STARRS 1	·	1.5 km	MPC · JPL
696627	2016 PB_{100}	—	October 2, 2008	Kitt Peak	Spacewatch	·	1.1 km	MPC · JPL
696628	2016 PB_{101}	—	September 22, 2003	Kitt Peak	Spacewatch	·	1.3 km	MPC · JPL
696629	2016 PF_{101}	—	January 2, 2009	Mount Lemmon	Mount Lemmon Survey	·	1.4 km	MPC · JPL
696630	2016 PH_{101}	—	September 25, 2012	Mount Lemmon	Mount Lemmon Survey	·	1.5 km	MPC · JPL
696631	2016 PD_{102}	—	August 31, 2011	Haleakala	Pan-STARRS 1	·	1.4 km	MPC · JPL
696632	2016 PE_{102}	—	October 3, 2003	Kitt Peak	Spacewatch	·	1.7 km	MPC · JPL
696633	2016 PC_{103}	—	September 27, 2003	Kitt Peak	Spacewatch	·	1.3 km	MPC · JPL
696634	2016 PD_{103}	—	April 18, 2007	Kitt Peak	Spacewatch	·	1.3 km	MPC · JPL
696635	2016 PT_{103}	—	October 18, 2012	Mount Lemmon	Mount Lemmon Survey	·	1.4 km	MPC · JPL
696636	2016 PZ_{103}	—	August 1, 2016	Haleakala	Pan-STARRS 1	·	1.3 km	MPC · JPL
696637	2016 PS_{104}	—	August 1, 2016	Haleakala	Pan-STARRS 1	HOF	1.7 km	MPC · JPL
696638	2016 PZ_{105}	—	June 11, 2015	Haleakala	Pan-STARRS 1	·	1.6 km	MPC · JPL
696639	2016 PR_{106}	—	January 28, 2015	Haleakala	Pan-STARRS 1	EUN	960 m	MPC · JPL
696640	2016 PC_{107}	—	August 2, 2016	Haleakala	Pan-STARRS 1	WIT	810 m	MPC · JPL
696641	2016 PY_{107}	—	August 2, 2016	Haleakala	Pan-STARRS 1	·	1.4 km	MPC · JPL
696642	2016 PC_{109}	—	October 18, 2012	Haleakala	Pan-STARRS 1	PAD	1.1 km	MPC · JPL
696643	2016 PF_{117}	—	August 27, 2006	Kitt Peak	Spacewatch	·	1.5 km	MPC · JPL
696644	2016 PH_{117}	—	August 3, 2016	Haleakala	Pan-STARRS 1	·	1.4 km	MPC · JPL
696645	2016 PR_{117}	—	February 6, 2002	Kitt Peak	Deep Ecliptic Survey	MIS	1.9 km	MPC · JPL
696646	2016 PY_{117}	—	May 25, 2015	Haleakala	Pan-STARRS 1	·	1.8 km	MPC · JPL
696647	2016 PH_{120}	—	May 22, 2011	Mount Lemmon	Mount Lemmon Survey	·	1.4 km	MPC · JPL
696648	2016 PU_{121}	—	April 12, 2011	Catalina	CSS	·	1.4 km	MPC · JPL
696649	2016 PC_{122}	—	September 4, 2011	Haleakala	Pan-STARRS 1	·	1.7 km	MPC · JPL
696650	2016 PH_{125}	—	September 21, 2003	Palomar	NEAT	·	1.6 km	MPC · JPL
696651	2016 PJ_{126}	—	March 21, 2010	Mount Lemmon	Mount Lemmon Survey	HNS	1.1 km	MPC · JPL
696652	2016 PO_{151}	—	August 1, 2016	Haleakala	Pan-STARRS 1	·	1.4 km	MPC · JPL
696653	2016 PP_{151}	—	August 1, 2016	Haleakala	Pan-STARRS 1	·	1.4 km	MPC · JPL
696654	2016 PF_{153}	—	August 26, 2012	Haleakala	Pan-STARRS 1	·	1.2 km	MPC · JPL
696655	2016 PD_{154}	—	August 1, 2016	Haleakala	Pan-STARRS 1	·	1.7 km	MPC · JPL
696656	2016 PX_{154}	—	August 7, 2016	Haleakala	Pan-STARRS 1	·	1.3 km	MPC · JPL
696657	2016 PC_{157}	—	August 1, 2016	Haleakala	Pan-STARRS 1	·	1.4 km	MPC · JPL
696658	2016 PE_{158}	—	August 3, 2016	Haleakala	Pan-STARRS 1	·	860 m	MPC · JPL
696659	2016 PW_{176}	—	August 10, 2016	Haleakala	Pan-STARRS 1	·	2.0 km	MPC · JPL
696660	2016 PM_{185}	—	August 10, 2016	Haleakala	Pan-STARRS 1	·	1.4 km	MPC · JPL
696661	2016 PC_{195}	—	August 10, 2016	Haleakala	Pan-STARRS 1	AGN	890 m	MPC · JPL
696662	2016 PQ_{202}	—	February 26, 2014	Haleakala	Pan-STARRS 1	KOR	1.3 km	MPC · JPL
696663	2016 PZ_{205}	—	August 7, 2016	Haleakala	Pan-STARRS 1	·	1.6 km	MPC · JPL
696664	2016 PH_{207}	—	August 2, 2016	Haleakala	Pan-STARRS 1	HOF	2.0 km	MPC · JPL
696665	2016 PB_{210}	—	August 14, 2016	Haleakala	Pan-STARRS 1	·	1.5 km	MPC · JPL
696666	2016 PZ_{212}	—	August 8, 2016	Haleakala	Pan-STARRS 1	·	1.6 km	MPC · JPL
696667	2016 PR_{219}	—	August 8, 2016	Haleakala	Pan-STARRS 1	KOR	890 m	MPC · JPL
696668	2016 PK_{221}	—	August 10, 2016	Haleakala	Pan-STARRS 1	·	1.7 km	MPC · JPL
696669	2016 PL_{221}	—	August 11, 2016	Haleakala	Pan-STARRS 1	·	2.0 km	MPC · JPL
696670	2016 PW_{221}	—	August 3, 2016	Haleakala	Pan-STARRS 1	·	1.2 km	MPC · JPL
696671	2016 PU_{222}	—	August 3, 2016	Haleakala	Pan-STARRS 1	·	1.4 km	MPC · JPL
696672	2016 PJ_{224}	—	August 3, 2016	Haleakala	Pan-STARRS 1	·	1.4 km	MPC · JPL
696673	2016 PZ_{224}	—	August 14, 2016	Haleakala	Pan-STARRS 1	·	1.5 km	MPC · JPL
696674	2016 PH_{225}	—	August 1, 2016	Haleakala	Pan-STARRS 1	GEF	990 m	MPC · JPL
696675	2016 PU_{226}	—	August 14, 2016	Haleakala	Pan-STARRS 1	KOR	1.1 km	MPC · JPL
696676	2016 PV_{226}	—	August 8, 2016	Haleakala	Pan-STARRS 1	·	1.5 km	MPC · JPL
696677	2016 PB_{227}	—	August 3, 2016	Haleakala	Pan-STARRS 1	·	1.4 km	MPC · JPL
696678	2016 PJ_{227}	—	August 10, 2016	Haleakala	Pan-STARRS 1	·	1.4 km	MPC · JPL
696679	2016 PK_{227}	—	August 11, 2016	Haleakala	Pan-STARRS 1	·	1.4 km	MPC · JPL
696680	2016 PE_{228}	—	August 2, 2016	Haleakala	Pan-STARRS 1	·	1.7 km	MPC · JPL
696681	2016 PF_{228}	—	August 1, 2016	Haleakala	Pan-STARRS 1	·	1.2 km	MPC · JPL
696682	2016 PT_{228}	—	August 3, 2016	Haleakala	Pan-STARRS 1	·	1.6 km	MPC · JPL
696683	2016 PG_{229}	—	August 2, 2016	Haleakala	Pan-STARRS 1	·	1.5 km	MPC · JPL
696684	2016 PK_{229}	—	August 2, 2016	Haleakala	Pan-STARRS 1	HOF	2.0 km	MPC · JPL
696685	2016 PC_{231}	—	August 3, 2016	Haleakala	Pan-STARRS 1	KOR	910 m	MPC · JPL
696686	2016 PW_{231}	—	August 10, 2016	Haleakala	Pan-STARRS 1	·	1.5 km	MPC · JPL
696687	2016 PA_{233}	—	August 2, 2016	Haleakala	Pan-STARRS 1	·	1.1 km	MPC · JPL
696688	2016 PE_{235}	—	August 1, 2016	Haleakala	Pan-STARRS 1	·	1.8 km	MPC · JPL
696689	2016 PA_{236}	—	August 3, 2016	Haleakala	Pan-STARRS 1	·	1.1 km	MPC · JPL
696690	2016 PC_{242}	—	August 7, 2016	Haleakala	Pan-STARRS 1	·	2.3 km	MPC · JPL
696691	2016 PS_{243}	—	August 9, 2016	Haleakala	Pan-STARRS 1	·	1.5 km	MPC · JPL
696692	2016 PU_{243}	—	August 2, 2016	Haleakala	Pan-STARRS 1	·	1.3 km	MPC · JPL
696693	2016 PQ_{249}	—	August 3, 2016	Haleakala	Pan-STARRS 1	·	1.4 km	MPC · JPL
696694	2016 PR_{266}	—	August 7, 2016	Haleakala	Pan-STARRS 1	·	1.9 km	MPC · JPL
696695	2016 PV_{271}	—	November 6, 2012	Kitt Peak	Spacewatch	·	1.6 km	MPC · JPL
696696	2016 PO_{291}	—	March 29, 2011	Mount Lemmon	Mount Lemmon Survey	(1547)	1.4 km	MPC · JPL
696697	2016 PJ_{292}	—	August 3, 2016	Haleakala	Pan-STARRS 1	·	1.1 km	MPC · JPL
696698	2016 PN_{294}	—	August 8, 2016	Haleakala	Pan-STARRS 1	·	1.2 km	MPC · JPL
696699	2016 QU	—	September 1, 2002	Palomar	NEAT	HOF	1.9 km	MPC · JPL
696700	2016 QT_{2}	—	August 3, 2016	Haleakala	Pan-STARRS 1	·	1.5 km	MPC · JPL

== 696701–696800 ==
back to top

Designation			Discovery			Properties		Ref
Permanent	Provisional	Named after	Date	Site	Discoverer(s)	Category	Diam.	Ref
696701	2016 QA_{3}	—	December 22, 2008	Kitt Peak	Spacewatch	·	1.4 km	MPC · JPL
696702	2016 QV_{3}	—	October 7, 2012	Haleakala	Pan-STARRS 1	·	1.3 km	MPC · JPL
696703	2016 QU_{4}	—	August 10, 2007	Kitt Peak	Spacewatch	AGN	1.0 km	MPC · JPL
696704	2016 QG_{5}	—	October 8, 2008	Mount Lemmon	Mount Lemmon Survey	·	1.4 km	MPC · JPL
696705	2016 QO_{5}	—	October 6, 2012	Haleakala	Pan-STARRS 1	·	1.7 km	MPC · JPL
696706	2016 QQ_{5}	—	June 7, 2016	Haleakala	Pan-STARRS 1	EUN	900 m	MPC · JPL
696707	2016 QH_{6}	—	June 9, 2008	Kitt Peak	Spacewatch	·	1.3 km	MPC · JPL
696708	2016 QD_{7}	—	September 26, 2003	Apache Point	SDSS Collaboration	·	1.5 km	MPC · JPL
696709	2016 QP_{7}	—	September 26, 2003	Apache Point	SDSS Collaboration	·	1.6 km	MPC · JPL
696710	2016 QO_{9}	—	November 3, 2012	Mount Lemmon	Mount Lemmon Survey	·	1.4 km	MPC · JPL
696711	2016 QF_{12}	—	October 1, 2011	Piszkéstető	K. Sárneczky	·	2.2 km	MPC · JPL
696712	2016 QP_{13}	—	September 14, 2007	Mount Lemmon	Mount Lemmon Survey	·	1.4 km	MPC · JPL
696713	2016 QC_{14}	—	September 13, 2007	Mount Lemmon	Mount Lemmon Survey	AEO	1.0 km	MPC · JPL
696714	2016 QK_{14}	—	September 4, 2007	Mount Lemmon	Mount Lemmon Survey	·	1.5 km	MPC · JPL
696715	2016 QV_{15}	—	October 23, 2012	Kitt Peak	Spacewatch	·	1.5 km	MPC · JPL
696716	2016 QT_{17}	—	September 21, 2003	Palomar	NEAT	·	1.3 km	MPC · JPL
696717	2016 QJ_{22}	—	August 26, 2016	Haleakala	Pan-STARRS 1	·	1.6 km	MPC · JPL
696718	2016 QU_{22}	—	October 11, 2005	Kitt Peak	Spacewatch	VER	2.3 km	MPC · JPL
696719	2016 QV_{24}	—	August 10, 2012	Kitt Peak	Spacewatch	·	1.0 km	MPC · JPL
696720	2016 QQ_{31}	—	October 17, 2012	Mount Lemmon	Mount Lemmon Survey	AGN	1.0 km	MPC · JPL
696721	2016 QJ_{32}	—	August 2, 2016	Haleakala	Pan-STARRS 1	·	1.7 km	MPC · JPL
696722	2016 QM_{32}	—	December 29, 2008	Mount Lemmon	Mount Lemmon Survey	·	1.5 km	MPC · JPL
696723	2016 QT_{32}	—	September 14, 2007	Kitt Peak	Spacewatch	·	1.8 km	MPC · JPL
696724	2016 QC_{33}	—	July 11, 2016	Haleakala	Pan-STARRS 1	·	1.2 km	MPC · JPL
696725	2016 QS_{35}	—	February 20, 2014	Mount Lemmon	Mount Lemmon Survey	·	1.7 km	MPC · JPL
696726	2016 QA_{37}	—	September 13, 2007	Mount Lemmon	Mount Lemmon Survey	·	1.6 km	MPC · JPL
696727	2016 QM_{39}	—	December 21, 2006	Kitt Peak	Spacewatch	·	2.2 km	MPC · JPL
696728	2016 QD_{42}	—	June 21, 2001	Calar Alto	Calar Alto	KOR	1.2 km	MPC · JPL
696729	2016 QV_{42}	—	February 20, 2015	Haleakala	Pan-STARRS 1	·	1.3 km	MPC · JPL
696730	2016 QV_{43}	—	September 11, 2007	Mount Lemmon	Mount Lemmon Survey	MIS	2.3 km	MPC · JPL
696731	2016 QS_{46}	—	November 19, 2012	Kitt Peak	Spacewatch	AEO	910 m	MPC · JPL
696732	2016 QS_{48}	—	September 24, 2000	Socorro	LINEAR	·	2.2 km	MPC · JPL
696733	2016 QV_{51}	—	October 11, 2012	Kitt Peak	Spacewatch	PAD	1.5 km	MPC · JPL
696734	2016 QH_{52}	—	December 19, 2003	Kitt Peak	Spacewatch	·	1.8 km	MPC · JPL
696735	2016 QY_{52}	—	August 12, 2016	Haleakala	Pan-STARRS 1	VER	2.2 km	MPC · JPL
696736	2016 QE_{53}	—	July 14, 2016	Haleakala	Pan-STARRS 1	·	1.3 km	MPC · JPL
696737	2016 QW_{53}	—	November 18, 2011	Mount Lemmon	Mount Lemmon Survey	·	2.9 km	MPC · JPL
696738	2016 QS_{54}	—	August 3, 2016	Haleakala	Pan-STARRS 1	·	1.6 km	MPC · JPL
696739	2016 QP_{59}	—	February 20, 2015	Haleakala	Pan-STARRS 1	EUN	1.2 km	MPC · JPL
696740	2016 QQ_{60}	—	August 13, 2012	Kitt Peak	Spacewatch	·	900 m	MPC · JPL
696741	2016 QS_{60}	—	July 11, 2016	Haleakala	Pan-STARRS 1	·	1.5 km	MPC · JPL
696742	2016 QN_{62}	—	August 28, 2016	Mount Lemmon	Mount Lemmon Survey	·	1.4 km	MPC · JPL
696743	2016 QW_{62}	—	August 29, 2016	Mount Lemmon	Mount Lemmon Survey	·	1.5 km	MPC · JPL
696744	2016 QL_{64}	—	September 25, 2012	Mount Lemmon	T. Vorobjov, A. Kostin	·	1.3 km	MPC · JPL
696745	2016 QC_{69}	—	August 29, 2016	Mount Lemmon	Mount Lemmon Survey	·	1.5 km	MPC · JPL
696746	2016 QB_{74}	—	August 29, 2016	Mount Lemmon	Mount Lemmon Survey	·	1.2 km	MPC · JPL
696747	2016 QY_{75}	—	May 24, 2011	Haleakala	Pan-STARRS 1	·	1.4 km	MPC · JPL
696748	2016 QR_{76}	—	September 14, 2012	Catalina	CSS	·	1.2 km	MPC · JPL
696749	2016 QS_{77}	—	July 7, 2016	Mount Lemmon	Mount Lemmon Survey	(1547)	1.1 km	MPC · JPL
696750	2016 QA_{88}	—	May 24, 2015	Haleakala	Pan-STARRS 1	EUN	1.1 km	MPC · JPL
696751	2016 QR_{88}	—	September 4, 2002	Palomar	NEAT	·	1.7 km	MPC · JPL
696752	2016 QV_{88}	—	October 9, 2007	Mount Lemmon	Mount Lemmon Survey	·	1.4 km	MPC · JPL
696753	2016 QX_{89}	—	August 30, 2016	Haleakala	Pan-STARRS 1	AGN	930 m	MPC · JPL
696754	2016 QZ_{89}	—	November 2, 2011	Kitt Peak	Spacewatch	·	2.1 km	MPC · JPL
696755	2016 QP_{91}	—	January 31, 2015	Haleakala	Pan-STARRS 1	·	1.4 km	MPC · JPL
696756	2016 QW_{91}	—	November 12, 2012	Mount Lemmon	Mount Lemmon Survey	·	1.6 km	MPC · JPL
696757	2016 QZ_{91}	—	November 9, 2007	Kitt Peak	Spacewatch	·	1.3 km	MPC · JPL
696758	2016 QM_{94}	—	March 29, 2015	Haleakala	Pan-STARRS 1	·	1.4 km	MPC · JPL
696759	2016 QC_{95}	—	August 27, 2016	Haleakala	Pan-STARRS 1	TIR	2.4 km	MPC · JPL
696760	2016 QF_{95}	—	August 28, 2016	Mount Lemmon	Mount Lemmon Survey	·	1.5 km	MPC · JPL
696761	2016 QE_{96}	—	August 27, 2016	Haleakala	Pan-STARRS 1	·	1.6 km	MPC · JPL
696762	2016 QD_{97}	—	November 19, 2003	Kitt Peak	Spacewatch	·	1.4 km	MPC · JPL
696763	2016 QE_{104}	—	August 28, 2016	Kitt Peak	Spacewatch	·	1.8 km	MPC · JPL
696764	2016 QJ_{105}	—	August 29, 2016	Mount Lemmon	Mount Lemmon Survey	·	1.7 km	MPC · JPL
696765	2016 QM_{105}	—	August 27, 2016	Haleakala	Pan-STARRS 1	·	2.0 km	MPC · JPL
696766	2016 QJ_{106}	—	October 4, 2007	Kitt Peak	Spacewatch	·	1.5 km	MPC · JPL
696767	2016 QO_{106}	—	August 28, 2016	Mount Lemmon	Mount Lemmon Survey	·	1.4 km	MPC · JPL
696768	2016 QY_{106}	—	August 17, 2016	Haleakala	Pan-STARRS 1	·	1.3 km	MPC · JPL
696769	2016 QD_{109}	—	August 27, 2016	Haleakala	Pan-STARRS 1	·	1.3 km	MPC · JPL
696770	2016 QT_{113}	—	August 30, 2016	Mount Lemmon	Mount Lemmon Survey	·	1.4 km	MPC · JPL
696771	2016 QW_{117}	—	August 29, 2016	Mount Lemmon	Mount Lemmon Survey	·	1.0 km	MPC · JPL
696772	2016 QL_{120}	—	August 29, 2016	Mount Lemmon	Mount Lemmon Survey	TIN	670 m	MPC · JPL
696773	2016 QC_{123}	—	August 30, 2016	Haleakala	Pan-STARRS 1	·	1.4 km	MPC · JPL
696774	2016 QL_{124}	—	August 16, 2016	Haleakala	Pan-STARRS 1	·	2.6 km	MPC · JPL
696775	2016 QW_{124}	—	August 27, 2016	Haleakala	Pan-STARRS 1	AGN	950 m	MPC · JPL
696776	2016 QH_{126}	—	August 27, 2016	Haleakala	Pan-STARRS 1	·	1.2 km	MPC · JPL
696777	2016 QZ_{127}	—	August 24, 2016	Kitt Peak	Spacewatch	·	1.4 km	MPC · JPL
696778	2016 QF_{128}	—	August 30, 2016	Mount Lemmon	Mount Lemmon Survey	KOR	1.2 km	MPC · JPL
696779	2016 QV_{128}	—	August 30, 2016	Haleakala	Pan-STARRS 1	·	1.5 km	MPC · JPL
696780	2016 QH_{129}	—	August 27, 2016	Haleakala	Pan-STARRS 1	·	2.2 km	MPC · JPL
696781	2016 QL_{129}	—	August 27, 2016	Haleakala	Pan-STARRS 1	·	1.4 km	MPC · JPL
696782	2016 QN_{129}	—	August 29, 2016	Mount Lemmon	Mount Lemmon Survey	BRA	1.0 km	MPC · JPL
696783	2016 QM_{133}	—	August 26, 2016	Haleakala	Pan-STARRS 1	NAE	1.9 km	MPC · JPL
696784	2016 QL_{135}	—	August 28, 2016	Mount Lemmon	Mount Lemmon Survey	KOR	1.1 km	MPC · JPL
696785	2016 QR_{135}	—	August 28, 2016	Mount Lemmon	Mount Lemmon Survey	·	1.2 km	MPC · JPL
696786	2016 QX_{136}	—	August 28, 2016	Mount Lemmon	Mount Lemmon Survey	·	1.5 km	MPC · JPL
696787	2016 QG_{137}	—	August 28, 2016	Mount Lemmon	Mount Lemmon Survey	·	1.6 km	MPC · JPL
696788	2016 QK_{138}	—	August 30, 2016	Mount Lemmon	Mount Lemmon Survey	·	1.5 km	MPC · JPL
696789	2016 QQ_{138}	—	August 30, 2016	Haleakala	Pan-STARRS 1	·	1.2 km	MPC · JPL
696790	2016 QZ_{138}	—	August 27, 2016	Haleakala	Pan-STARRS 1	·	2.1 km	MPC · JPL
696791	2016 QB_{144}	—	August 26, 2016	Haleakala	Pan-STARRS 1	·	1.2 km	MPC · JPL
696792	2016 QG_{146}	—	August 30, 2016	Haleakala	Pan-STARRS 1	·	1.7 km	MPC · JPL
696793	2016 QB_{151}	—	August 29, 2016	Mount Lemmon	Mount Lemmon Survey	EOS	1.5 km	MPC · JPL
696794	2016 QD_{156}	—	September 25, 2011	Haleakala	Pan-STARRS 1	·	2.0 km	MPC · JPL
696795	2016 QQ_{157}	—	August 30, 2016	Haleakala	Pan-STARRS 1	·	1.8 km	MPC · JPL
696796	2016 RJ_{3}	—	September 28, 2003	Kitt Peak	Spacewatch	·	1.4 km	MPC · JPL
696797	2016 RD_{5}	—	October 25, 2013	Mount Lemmon	Mount Lemmon Survey	·	520 m	MPC · JPL
696798	2016 RG_{12}	—	September 21, 2012	Kitt Peak	Spacewatch	·	1.5 km	MPC · JPL
696799	2016 RG_{14}	—	October 9, 2012	Mount Lemmon	Mount Lemmon Survey	·	1.3 km	MPC · JPL
696800	2016 RS_{15}	—	August 10, 2016	Haleakala	Pan-STARRS 1	·	1.6 km	MPC · JPL

== 696801–696900 ==
back to top

Designation			Discovery			Properties		Ref
Permanent	Provisional	Named after	Date	Site	Discoverer(s)	Category	Diam.	Ref
696801	2016 RX_{22}	—	August 24, 2007	Kitt Peak	Spacewatch	AGN	970 m	MPC · JPL
696802	2016 RF_{23}	—	July 3, 2003	Kitt Peak	Spacewatch	·	1.4 km	MPC · JPL
696803	2016 RT_{28}	—	October 11, 2012	Kitt Peak	Spacewatch	EUN	1 km	MPC · JPL
696804	2016 RZ_{31}	—	August 14, 2016	Haleakala	Pan-STARRS 1	·	1.8 km	MPC · JPL
696805	2016 RG_{32}	—	September 21, 2011	Mount Lemmon	Mount Lemmon Survey	KOR	1.2 km	MPC · JPL
696806	2016 RX_{32}	—	July 14, 2016	Haleakala	Pan-STARRS 1	·	1.2 km	MPC · JPL
696807	2016 RB_{35}	—	December 6, 2008	Kitt Peak	Spacewatch	·	1.3 km	MPC · JPL
696808	2016 RA_{39}	—	May 21, 2015	Haleakala	Pan-STARRS 1	·	1.9 km	MPC · JPL
696809	2016 RA_{40}	—	December 23, 2012	Haleakala	Pan-STARRS 1	·	1.5 km	MPC · JPL
696810	2016 RE_{40}	—	September 12, 2016	Wildberg	R. Apitzsch	·	1.5 km	MPC · JPL
696811	2016 RP_{44}	—	September 29, 2005	Kitt Peak	Spacewatch	·	2.1 km	MPC · JPL
696812	2016 RQ_{46}	—	September 12, 2016	Haleakala	Pan-STARRS 1	·	1.3 km	MPC · JPL
696813	2016 RM_{47}	—	October 11, 2012	Nogales	M. Schwartz, P. R. Holvorcem	MAR	1.1 km	MPC · JPL
696814	2016 RO_{48}	—	September 8, 2016	Haleakala	Pan-STARRS 1	·	1.9 km	MPC · JPL
696815	2016 RK_{49}	—	May 21, 2015	Haleakala	Pan-STARRS 1	·	1.4 km	MPC · JPL
696816	2016 RZ_{53}	—	June 21, 2007	Mount Lemmon	Mount Lemmon Survey	·	1.4 km	MPC · JPL
696817	2016 RM_{59}	—	September 8, 2016	Haleakala	Pan-STARRS 1	EOS	1.3 km	MPC · JPL
696818	2016 RO_{59}	—	September 3, 2016	Mount Lemmon	Mount Lemmon Survey	AGN	1.0 km	MPC · JPL
696819	2016 RR_{59}	—	September 4, 2016	Mount Lemmon	Mount Lemmon Survey	HOF	2.4 km	MPC · JPL
696820	2016 RH_{62}	—	September 5, 2016	Mount Lemmon	Mount Lemmon Survey	·	2.4 km	MPC · JPL
696821	2016 RH_{65}	—	September 10, 2016	Mount Lemmon	Mount Lemmon Survey	EOS	1.3 km	MPC · JPL
696822	2016 RS_{67}	—	September 10, 2016	Mount Lemmon	Mount Lemmon Survey	AGN	870 m	MPC · JPL
696823	2016 RJ_{69}	—	September 12, 2016	Haleakala	Pan-STARRS 1	·	1.9 km	MPC · JPL
696824	2016 RD_{71}	—	September 6, 2016	Mount Lemmon	Mount Lemmon Survey	·	2.2 km	MPC · JPL
696825	2016 RM_{76}	—	September 10, 2016	Mount Lemmon	Mount Lemmon Survey	HOF	2.1 km	MPC · JPL
696826	2016 RZ_{76}	—	December 8, 2012	Mount Lemmon	Mount Lemmon Survey	·	1.3 km	MPC · JPL
696827	2016 RH_{77}	—	September 8, 2016	Haleakala	Pan-STARRS 1	·	2.0 km	MPC · JPL
696828	2016 RS_{77}	—	September 6, 2016	Mount Lemmon	Mount Lemmon Survey	·	1.5 km	MPC · JPL
696829	2016 RT_{77}	—	September 12, 2016	Haleakala	Pan-STARRS 1	EOS	1.5 km	MPC · JPL
696830	2016 RX_{77}	—	September 10, 2016	Kitt Peak	Spacewatch	·	1.2 km	MPC · JPL
696831	2016 RA_{84}	—	September 9, 2016	Mount Lemmon	Mount Lemmon Survey	HOF	1.9 km	MPC · JPL
696832	2016 RJ_{84}	—	September 10, 2016	Mount Lemmon	Mount Lemmon Survey	·	1.4 km	MPC · JPL
696833	2016 RN_{84}	—	September 11, 2016	Mount Lemmon	Mount Lemmon Survey	·	1.3 km	MPC · JPL
696834	2016 RP_{84}	—	September 4, 2016	Mount Lemmon	Mount Lemmon Survey	·	1.1 km	MPC · JPL
696835	2016 RX_{84}	—	September 8, 2016	Haleakala	Pan-STARRS 1	·	1.4 km	MPC · JPL
696836	2016 RQ_{85}	—	September 8, 2016	Haleakala	Pan-STARRS 1	AGN	1.0 km	MPC · JPL
696837	2016 RX_{85}	—	September 6, 2016	Mount Lemmon	Mount Lemmon Survey	·	1.3 km	MPC · JPL
696838	2016 RY_{89}	—	September 26, 2003	Apache Point	SDSS Collaboration	·	1.0 km	MPC · JPL
696839	2016 RV_{90}	—	September 6, 2016	Mount Lemmon	Mount Lemmon Survey	·	1.5 km	MPC · JPL
696840	2016 SJ_{8}	—	May 23, 2014	Haleakala	Pan-STARRS 1	·	1.9 km	MPC · JPL
696841	2016 SD_{9}	—	July 10, 2016	Mount Lemmon	Mount Lemmon Survey	EUN	1.1 km	MPC · JPL
696842	2016 SM_{10}	—	February 24, 2006	Mount Lemmon	Mount Lemmon Survey	·	1.7 km	MPC · JPL
696843	2016 SZ_{13}	—	October 17, 2003	Kitt Peak	Spacewatch	·	1.4 km	MPC · JPL
696844	2016 SG_{19}	—	October 9, 1999	Socorro	LINEAR	·	1.1 km	MPC · JPL
696845	2016 SH_{19}	—	October 1, 2003	Kitt Peak	Spacewatch	ADE	1.7 km	MPC · JPL
696846	2016 SJ_{20}	—	August 14, 2016	Haleakala	Pan-STARRS 1	·	1.2 km	MPC · JPL
696847	2016 SC_{23}	—	September 26, 2005	Kitt Peak	Spacewatch	·	1.2 km	MPC · JPL
696848	2016 SH_{25}	—	September 6, 2016	Mount Lemmon	Mount Lemmon Survey	·	1.2 km	MPC · JPL
696849	2016 SQ_{26}	—	February 27, 2009	Kitt Peak	Spacewatch	·	1.5 km	MPC · JPL
696850	2016 SY_{26}	—	September 6, 2016	Mount Lemmon	Mount Lemmon Survey	AGN	820 m	MPC · JPL
696851	2016 SU_{27}	—	December 31, 2007	Kitt Peak	Spacewatch	·	1.4 km	MPC · JPL
696852	2016 SA_{32}	—	August 31, 2011	Haleakala	Pan-STARRS 1	·	1.8 km	MPC · JPL
696853	2016 SO_{32}	—	August 4, 2005	Palomar	NEAT	·	1.2 km	MPC · JPL
696854	2016 SV_{34}	—	July 28, 2011	Haleakala	Pan-STARRS 1	·	1.5 km	MPC · JPL
696855	2016 SC_{36}	—	October 21, 2011	Mount Lemmon	Mount Lemmon Survey	EOS	1.5 km	MPC · JPL
696856	2016 SH_{38}	—	October 16, 2003	Kitt Peak	Spacewatch	JUN	840 m	MPC · JPL
696857	2016 SQ_{38}	—	January 30, 2006	Kitt Peak	Spacewatch	·	1.2 km	MPC · JPL
696858	2016 SE_{41}	—	November 3, 2007	Kitt Peak	Spacewatch	·	1.5 km	MPC · JPL
696859	2016 SH_{41}	—	August 2, 2016	Haleakala	Pan-STARRS 1	·	1.4 km	MPC · JPL
696860	2016 SD_{42}	—	May 21, 2015	Haleakala	Pan-STARRS 1	AGN	870 m	MPC · JPL
696861	2016 SZ_{42}	—	August 27, 2016	Haleakala	Pan-STARRS 1	·	1.4 km	MPC · JPL
696862	2016 SQ_{45}	—	September 10, 2007	Mount Lemmon	Mount Lemmon Survey	·	1.3 km	MPC · JPL
696863	2016 SM_{47}	—	September 25, 2016	Haleakala	Pan-STARRS 1	·	2.2 km	MPC · JPL
696864	2016 SN_{47}	—	September 25, 2016	Haleakala	Pan-STARRS 1	·	2.3 km	MPC · JPL
696865	2016 SJ_{49}	—	April 25, 2015	Haleakala	Pan-STARRS 1	·	1.5 km	MPC · JPL
696866	2016 SY_{49}	—	September 14, 2002	Palomar Mountain	NEAT	DOR	2.0 km	MPC · JPL
696867	2016 SM_{51}	—	October 10, 2007	Mount Lemmon	Mount Lemmon Survey	·	1.9 km	MPC · JPL
696868	2016 SP_{51}	—	November 1, 2007	Kitt Peak	Spacewatch	·	1.7 km	MPC · JPL
696869	2016 ST_{52}	—	September 25, 2016	Haleakala	Pan-STARRS 1	EOS	1.4 km	MPC · JPL
696870	2016 SV_{52}	—	September 25, 2016	Haleakala	Pan-STARRS 1	·	2.1 km	MPC · JPL
696871	2016 SW_{52}	—	June 14, 2015	Mount Lemmon	Mount Lemmon Survey	·	1.9 km	MPC · JPL
696872	2016 SC_{53}	—	September 25, 2016	Haleakala	Pan-STARRS 1	EOS	1.4 km	MPC · JPL
696873	2016 SC_{54}	—	September 27, 2016	Haleakala	Pan-STARRS 1	·	1.9 km	MPC · JPL
696874	2016 SP_{54}	—	December 18, 2009	Mount Lemmon	Mount Lemmon Survey	·	1.1 km	MPC · JPL
696875	2016 SS_{54}	—	September 27, 2016	Haleakala	Pan-STARRS 1	·	980 m	MPC · JPL
696876	2016 SU_{54}	—	May 14, 2015	Haleakala	Pan-STARRS 1	MAR	780 m	MPC · JPL
696877	2016 SF_{59}	—	September 26, 2016	Haleakala	Pan-STARRS 1	·	1.3 km	MPC · JPL
696878	2016 SG_{59}	—	September 22, 2016	Mount Lemmon	Mount Lemmon Survey	·	1.7 km	MPC · JPL
696879	2016 SH_{64}	—	September 25, 2016	Haleakala	Pan-STARRS 1	·	2.7 km	MPC · JPL
696880	2016 SO_{68}	—	September 25, 2016	Haleakala	Pan-STARRS 1	·	1.4 km	MPC · JPL
696881	2016 SQ_{73}	—	September 25, 2016	Haleakala	Pan-STARRS 1	·	2.2 km	MPC · JPL
696882	2016 SR_{73}	—	September 22, 2016	Mount Lemmon	Mount Lemmon Survey	·	1.6 km	MPC · JPL
696883	2016 SS_{73}	—	February 28, 2014	Haleakala	Pan-STARRS 1	·	1.6 km	MPC · JPL
696884	2016 SC_{74}	—	September 26, 2016	Haleakala	Pan-STARRS 1	EOS	1.2 km	MPC · JPL
696885	2016 SP_{74}	—	September 30, 2016	Haleakala	Pan-STARRS 1	·	1.3 km	MPC · JPL
696886	2016 SY_{75}	—	September 27, 2016	Mount Lemmon	Mount Lemmon Survey	·	2.5 km	MPC · JPL
696887	2016 SC_{76}	—	September 25, 2016	Mount Lemmon	Mount Lemmon Survey	·	1.3 km	MPC · JPL
696888	2016 SM_{76}	—	September 27, 2016	Haleakala	Pan-STARRS 1	·	1.8 km	MPC · JPL
696889	2016 SE_{77}	—	September 27, 2016	Haleakala	Pan-STARRS 1	·	1.5 km	MPC · JPL
696890	2016 SL_{78}	—	September 25, 2016	Haleakala	Pan-STARRS 1	EOS	1.3 km	MPC · JPL
696891	2016 ST_{80}	—	September 25, 2016	Mount Lemmon	Mount Lemmon Survey	·	2.0 km	MPC · JPL
696892	2016 SZ_{80}	—	September 26, 2016	Haleakala	Pan-STARRS 1	·	1.2 km	MPC · JPL
696893	2016 SF_{81}	—	December 9, 2012	Mount Lemmon	Mount Lemmon Survey	·	1.4 km	MPC · JPL
696894	2016 ST_{81}	—	September 25, 2016	Mount Lemmon	Mount Lemmon Survey	EOS	1.3 km	MPC · JPL
696895	2016 SF_{82}	—	September 25, 2016	Mount Lemmon	Mount Lemmon Survey	·	1.3 km	MPC · JPL
696896	2016 SP_{84}	—	September 30, 2016	Haleakala	Pan-STARRS 1	·	1.4 km	MPC · JPL
696897	2016 SW_{84}	—	September 27, 2016	Haleakala	Pan-STARRS 1	·	1.2 km	MPC · JPL
696898	2016 SX_{93}	—	September 26, 2016	Haleakala	Pan-STARRS 1	HOF	1.8 km	MPC · JPL
696899	2016 SW_{95}	—	August 27, 2006	Kitt Peak	Spacewatch	KOR	1.1 km	MPC · JPL
696900	2016 SB_{98}	—	September 27, 2016	Haleakala	Pan-STARRS 1	·	1.4 km	MPC · JPL

== 696901–697000 ==
back to top

Designation			Discovery			Properties		Ref
Permanent	Provisional	Named after	Date	Site	Discoverer(s)	Category	Diam.	Ref
696901	2016 SJ_{106}	—	February 3, 2013	Haleakala	Pan-STARRS 1	·	1.5 km	MPC · JPL
696902	2016 SB_{109}	—	September 22, 2016	Mount Lemmon	Mount Lemmon Survey	NAE	1.7 km	MPC · JPL
696903	2016 SD_{109}	—	September 30, 2016	Haleakala	Pan-STARRS 1	KOR	1.0 km	MPC · JPL
696904	2016 SO_{109}	—	September 26, 2011	Mount Lemmon	Mount Lemmon Survey	KOR	1.0 km	MPC · JPL
696905	2016 ST_{109}	—	September 26, 2016	Haleakala	Pan-STARRS 1	·	1.4 km	MPC · JPL
696906	2016 SA_{110}	—	September 30, 2016	Haleakala	Pan-STARRS 1	·	1.7 km	MPC · JPL
696907	2016 SG_{110}	—	September 25, 2016	Haleakala	Pan-STARRS 1	·	1.6 km	MPC · JPL
696908	2016 ST_{112}	—	September 27, 2016	Haleakala	Pan-STARRS 1	·	2.1 km	MPC · JPL
696909	2016 TT_{5}	—	December 30, 2008	Kitt Peak	Spacewatch	HOF	2.1 km	MPC · JPL
696910	2016 TV_{9}	—	March 15, 2015	Haleakala	Pan-STARRS 1	·	2.4 km	MPC · JPL
696911	2016 TR_{10}	—	December 13, 2006	Mount Lemmon	Mount Lemmon Survey	H	400 m	MPC · JPL
696912	2016 TP_{15}	—	December 29, 2008	Mount Lemmon	Mount Lemmon Survey	AGN	1.1 km	MPC · JPL
696913	2016 TO_{16}	—	December 23, 2012	Haleakala	Pan-STARRS 1	·	1.8 km	MPC · JPL
696914	2016 TF_{18}	—	September 26, 2003	Apache Point	SDSS Collaboration	·	540 m	MPC · JPL
696915	2016 TG_{22}	—	July 18, 2005	Palomar	NEAT	MAS	710 m	MPC · JPL
696916	2016 TQ_{27}	—	September 19, 2011	Mount Lemmon	Mount Lemmon Survey	·	1.6 km	MPC · JPL
696917	2016 TU_{28}	—	September 27, 2016	Mount Lemmon	Mount Lemmon Survey	·	2.0 km	MPC · JPL
696918	2016 TB_{37}	—	May 26, 2015	Haleakala	Pan-STARRS 1	·	1.6 km	MPC · JPL
696919	2016 TF_{37}	—	December 29, 2003	Kitt Peak	Spacewatch	·	1.7 km	MPC · JPL
696920	2016 TR_{38}	—	July 28, 2011	Haleakala	Pan-STARRS 1	·	1.4 km	MPC · JPL
696921	2016 TW_{40}	—	August 30, 2002	Palomar	NEAT	·	1.5 km	MPC · JPL
696922	2016 TM_{41}	—	September 24, 2011	Mount Lemmon	Mount Lemmon Survey	KOR	1.2 km	MPC · JPL
696923	2016 TG_{42}	—	October 6, 2016	Haleakala	Pan-STARRS 1	KOR	940 m	MPC · JPL
696924	2016 TQ_{43}	—	January 20, 2009	Kitt Peak	Spacewatch	·	1.6 km	MPC · JPL
696925	2016 TJ_{48}	—	October 7, 2016	Mount Lemmon	Mount Lemmon Survey	·	2.1 km	MPC · JPL
696926	2016 TJ_{49}	—	June 22, 2015	Haleakala	Pan-STARRS 1	EOS	1.3 km	MPC · JPL
696927	2016 TG_{52}	—	June 12, 2011	Mount Lemmon	Mount Lemmon Survey	·	1.9 km	MPC · JPL
696928	2016 TU_{57}	—	November 9, 2008	Mount Lemmon	Mount Lemmon Survey	·	1.6 km	MPC · JPL
696929	2016 TA_{58}	—	November 6, 2008	Kitt Peak	Spacewatch	EUN	1.3 km	MPC · JPL
696930	2016 TB_{58}	—	November 4, 2007	Kitt Peak	Spacewatch	·	1.7 km	MPC · JPL
696931	2016 TK_{61}	—	October 18, 2011	Kitt Peak	Spacewatch	·	1.3 km	MPC · JPL
696932	2016 TD_{65}	—	May 7, 2014	Haleakala	Pan-STARRS 1	EOS	1.4 km	MPC · JPL
696933	2016 TO_{67}	—	September 3, 2002	Palomar	NEAT	·	2.2 km	MPC · JPL
696934	2016 TQ_{68}	—	March 29, 2011	Mount Lemmon	Mount Lemmon Survey	V	600 m	MPC · JPL
696935	2016 TP_{70}	—	December 3, 2012	Mount Lemmon	Mount Lemmon Survey	·	1.4 km	MPC · JPL
696936	2016 TQ_{71}	—	August 27, 2016	Haleakala	Pan-STARRS 1	·	1.9 km	MPC · JPL
696937	2016 TH_{72}	—	July 12, 2015	Haleakala	Pan-STARRS 1	TIR	2.5 km	MPC · JPL
696938	2016 TD_{74}	—	August 10, 2016	Haleakala	Pan-STARRS 1	GEF	890 m	MPC · JPL
696939	2016 TL_{74}	—	October 20, 1993	Kitt Peak	Spacewatch	·	570 m	MPC · JPL
696940	2016 TK_{75}	—	April 23, 2015	Haleakala	Pan-STARRS 1	·	1.5 km	MPC · JPL
696941	2016 TX_{80}	—	December 3, 2012	Mount Lemmon	Mount Lemmon Survey	·	1.3 km	MPC · JPL
696942	2016 TS_{81}	—	January 30, 2014	Kitt Peak	Spacewatch	·	1.0 km	MPC · JPL
696943	2016 TF_{82}	—	October 29, 2002	Palomar	NEAT	·	2.5 km	MPC · JPL
696944	2016 TM_{89}	—	October 2, 2016	Oukaïmeden	C. Rinner	BRA	1.1 km	MPC · JPL
696945	2016 TO_{89}	—	October 12, 2016	Haleakala	Pan-STARRS 1	·	1.5 km	MPC · JPL
696946	2016 TR_{90}	—	November 5, 2005	Catalina	CSS	·	2.8 km	MPC · JPL
696947	2016 TY_{95}	—	March 26, 2014	Mount Lemmon	Mount Lemmon Survey	·	1.7 km	MPC · JPL
696948	2016 TO_{98}	—	September 25, 2016	Mount Lemmon	Mount Lemmon Survey	KOR	1.1 km	MPC · JPL
696949	2016 TS_{99}	—	October 12, 2016	Mount Lemmon	Mount Lemmon Survey	·	2.9 km	MPC · JPL
696950	2016 TV_{100}	—	February 7, 2007	Kitt Peak	Spacewatch	·	2.5 km	MPC · JPL
696951	2016 TY_{100}	—	October 12, 2016	Mount Lemmon	Mount Lemmon Survey	·	3.3 km	MPC · JPL
696952	2016 TK_{101}	—	October 12, 2016	Mount Lemmon	Mount Lemmon Survey	EUP	2.4 km	MPC · JPL
696953	2016 TX_{101}	—	October 7, 2016	Haleakala	Pan-STARRS 1	(22805)	2.4 km	MPC · JPL
696954	2016 TM_{104}	—	October 4, 2016	Mount Lemmon	Mount Lemmon Survey	THB	2.4 km	MPC · JPL
696955	2016 TE_{107}	—	July 5, 2005	Kitt Peak	Spacewatch	·	1.7 km	MPC · JPL
696956	2016 TB_{118}	—	October 8, 2016	Mount Lemmon	Mount Lemmon Survey	·	1.6 km	MPC · JPL
696957	2016 TS_{122}	—	October 13, 2016	Mount Lemmon	Mount Lemmon Survey	EOS	1.4 km	MPC · JPL
696958	2016 TR_{123}	—	October 7, 2016	Haleakala	Pan-STARRS 1	EOS	1.5 km	MPC · JPL
696959	2016 TX_{123}	—	October 7, 2010	Kitt Peak	Spacewatch	·	2.2 km	MPC · JPL
696960	2016 TZ_{123}	—	October 7, 2016	Haleakala	Pan-STARRS 1	EOS	1.6 km	MPC · JPL
696961	2016 TQ_{124}	—	October 12, 2016	Haleakala	Pan-STARRS 1	·	1.4 km	MPC · JPL
696962	2016 TS_{124}	—	October 4, 2016	Mount Lemmon	Mount Lemmon Survey	·	1.5 km	MPC · JPL
696963	2016 TG_{125}	—	October 7, 2016	Haleakala	Pan-STARRS 1	EOS	1.2 km	MPC · JPL
696964	2016 TR_{132}	—	October 6, 2016	Haleakala	Pan-STARRS 1	·	1.4 km	MPC · JPL
696965	2016 TH_{133}	—	October 12, 2016	Haleakala	Pan-STARRS 1	·	1.1 km	MPC · JPL
696966	2016 TS_{134}	—	October 8, 2016	Haleakala	Pan-STARRS 1	·	2.4 km	MPC · JPL
696967	2016 TB_{135}	—	April 3, 2013	Mount Lemmon	Mount Lemmon Survey	·	1.8 km	MPC · JPL
696968	2016 TY_{139}	—	October 7, 2016	Haleakala	Pan-STARRS 1	EOS	1.4 km	MPC · JPL
696969	2016 TC_{150}	—	October 8, 2016	Haleakala	Pan-STARRS 1	·	2.2 km	MPC · JPL
696970	2016 TD_{150}	—	October 8, 2016	Haleakala	Pan-STARRS 1	TRE	1.8 km	MPC · JPL
696971	2016 TA_{154}	—	October 12, 2016	Mount Lemmon	Mount Lemmon Survey	·	1.5 km	MPC · JPL
696972	2016 TP_{154}	—	October 6, 2016	Haleakala	Pan-STARRS 1	·	1.3 km	MPC · JPL
696973	2016 TB_{163}	—	October 9, 2016	Haleakala	Pan-STARRS 1	·	1.4 km	MPC · JPL
696974	2016 TB_{164}	—	October 6, 2016	Haleakala	Pan-STARRS 1	·	1.5 km	MPC · JPL
696975	2016 TG_{168}	—	May 7, 2014	Haleakala	Pan-STARRS 1	EOS	1.4 km	MPC · JPL
696976	2016 TC_{169}	—	October 12, 2016	Haleakala	Pan-STARRS 1	·	1.9 km	MPC · JPL
696977	2016 TH_{169}	—	October 12, 2016	Haleakala	Pan-STARRS 1	EOS	1.4 km	MPC · JPL
696978	2016 TV_{169}	—	October 7, 2016	Haleakala	Pan-STARRS 1	EOS	1.3 km	MPC · JPL
696979	2016 TX_{172}	—	August 8, 2016	Haleakala	Pan-STARRS 1	·	1.4 km	MPC · JPL
696980	2016 TF_{173}	—	October 4, 2016	Mount Lemmon	Mount Lemmon Survey	EOS	1.3 km	MPC · JPL
696981	2016 TN_{176}	—	October 8, 2016	Haleakala	Pan-STARRS 1	·	2.3 km	MPC · JPL
696982	2016 TQ_{177}	—	October 9, 2016	Haleakala	Pan-STARRS 1	·	2.3 km	MPC · JPL
696983	2016 TW_{177}	—	October 7, 2016	Haleakala	Pan-STARRS 1	VER	2.2 km	MPC · JPL
696984	2016 TE_{178}	—	October 9, 2016	Cerro Paranal	Altmann, M., Prusti, T.	EOS	1.2 km	MPC · JPL
696985	2016 TO_{178}	—	October 10, 2016	Haleakala	Pan-STARRS 1	ELF	2.7 km	MPC · JPL
696986	2016 TX_{180}	—	October 4, 2016	Kitt Peak	Spacewatch	KOR	1.1 km	MPC · JPL
696987	2016 TF_{181}	—	October 7, 2016	Haleakala	Pan-STARRS 1	EUP	2.3 km	MPC · JPL
696988	2016 TC_{183}	—	October 9, 2016	Mount Lemmon	Mount Lemmon Survey	KOR	960 m	MPC · JPL
696989	2016 TG_{183}	—	October 8, 2016	Haleakala	Pan-STARRS 1	·	1.7 km	MPC · JPL
696990	2016 TG_{186}	—	October 9, 2016	Mount Lemmon	Mount Lemmon Survey	AGN	910 m	MPC · JPL
696991	2016 TM_{195}	—	October 7, 2016	Haleakala	Pan-STARRS 1	·	2.3 km	MPC · JPL
696992	2016 TU_{197}	—	November 5, 2007	Mount Lemmon	Mount Lemmon Survey	KOR	870 m	MPC · JPL
696993	2016 TL_{200}	—	October 7, 2016	Haleakala	Pan-STARRS 1	KOR	1.1 km	MPC · JPL
696994	2016 TD_{207}	—	October 2, 2016	Mount Lemmon	Mount Lemmon Survey	·	1.5 km	MPC · JPL
696995	2016 UV_{2}	—	November 18, 2011	Mount Lemmon	Mount Lemmon Survey	EOS	1.2 km	MPC · JPL
696996	2016 UC_{7}	—	October 10, 2016	Mount Lemmon	Mount Lemmon Survey	·	1.3 km	MPC · JPL
696997	2016 UC_{8}	—	September 5, 2016	Mount Lemmon	Mount Lemmon Survey	·	1.5 km	MPC · JPL
696998	2016 UJ_{11}	—	October 5, 2002	Palomar	NEAT	·	1.8 km	MPC · JPL
696999	2016 UY_{11}	—	August 10, 2016	Haleakala	Pan-STARRS 1	TIR	2.0 km	MPC · JPL
697000	2016 UD_{17}	—	September 24, 2011	Mayhill-ISON	L. Elenin	TRE	2.0 km	MPC · JPL

back to top

== Meaning of names ==
As minor planet discoveries are confirmed, they are given a permanent number by the IAU's Minor Planet Center (MPC), and the discoverers can then submit names for them, following the IAU's naming conventions. The list below concerns those minor planets in the specified number-range that have received names, and explains the meanings of those names.

Official naming citations of newly named small Solar System bodies are approved and published in a bulletin by IAU's Working Group for Small Bodies Nomenclature (WGSBN). Before May 2021, citations were published in MPC's Minor Planet Circulars for many decades. Recent citations can also be found on the JPL Small-Body Database (SBDB). Until his death in 2016, German astronomer Lutz D. Schmadel compiled these citations into the Dictionary of Minor Planet Names (DMP) and regularly updated the collection.

Based on Paul Herget's The Names of the Minor Planets, Schmadel also researched the unclear origin of numerous asteroids, most of which had been named prior to World War II. This article incorporates text from this source, which is in the public domain: SBDB New namings may only be added to this list below after official publication as the preannouncement of names is condemned. The WGSBN publishes a comprehensive guideline for the naming rules of non-cometary small Solar System bodies.

Named minor planet	Provisional	This minor planet was named for...	Ref · Catalog
696315 Petraios	2016 GR_{206}	The centaur Petraios took part in the battle at the wedding of Pirithous, a symbolic clash between primal chaos and social order. His name means “rocky”, evoking strength and stability. As Ovid tells, Petraios fell while grappling with the rooted Earth. Like this minor planet, he marks the edge between structure and upheaval.	IAU · 696315
