= List of minor planets: 820001–821000 =

The following is a partial list of minor planets, running from minor-planet number 820001 through 821000, inclusive. The primary data for this and other partial lists is based on JPL's "Small-Body Orbital Elements" and data available from the Minor Planet Center. Critical list information is also provided by the MPC, unless otherwise specified from Lowell Observatory. A detailed description of the table's columns and additional sources are given on the main page including a complete list of every page in this series, and a statistical break-up on the dynamical classification of minor planets.

Also see the summary list of all named bodies in numerical and alphabetical order, and the corresponding naming citations for the number range of this particular list. New namings may only be added to this list after official publication, as the preannouncement of names is condemned by the Working Group for Small Bodies Nomenclature of the International Astronomical Union.

Near-Earth obj.	MBA (inner)	MBA (outer)	Centaur
Mars-crosser	MBA (middle)	Jupiter trojan	Trans-Neptunian obj.
Unclassified

== 820001–820100 ==
Designation			Discovery			Properties		Ref
Permanent	Provisional	Named after	Date	Site	Discoverer(s)	Category	Diam.	Ref
820001	2014 OD_{398}	—	July 30, 2014	Haleakala	Pan-STARRS 1	·	2.3 km	MPC · JPL
820002	2014 OJ_{402}	—	September 7, 2008	Mount Lemmon	Mount Lemmon Survey	·	2.4 km	MPC · JPL
820003	2014 OB_{403}	—	July 28, 2014	Haleakala	Pan-STARRS 1	·	860 m	MPC · JPL
820004	2014 OF_{403}	—	July 30, 2014	Haleakala	Pan-STARRS 1	EOS	1.4 km	MPC · JPL
820005	2014 OZ_{403}	—	July 28, 2014	Haleakala	Pan-STARRS 1	·	1.2 km	MPC · JPL
820006	2014 OG_{404}	—	September 20, 2009	Mount Lemmon	Mount Lemmon Survey	·	2.2 km	MPC · JPL
820007	2014 OR_{408}	—	April 15, 2013	Haleakala	Pan-STARRS 1	THM	2.0 km	MPC · JPL
820008	2014 ON_{415}	—	July 25, 2014	Haleakala	Pan-STARRS 1	·	730 m	MPC · JPL
820009	2014 OR_{415}	—	July 25, 2014	ESA OGS	ESA OGS	MAS	530 m	MPC · JPL
820010	2014 OX_{416}	—	July 28, 2014	Haleakala	Pan-STARRS 1	·	680 m	MPC · JPL
820011	2014 OY_{421}	—	July 27, 2014	Haleakala	Pan-STARRS 1	THB	1.9 km	MPC · JPL
820012	2014 OR_{422}	—	July 27, 2014	ESA OGS	ESA OGS	MAS	540 m	MPC · JPL
820013	2014 OK_{423}	—	July 28, 2014	Haleakala	Pan-STARRS 1	·	860 m	MPC · JPL
820014	2014 OC_{424}	—	July 25, 2014	Haleakala	Pan-STARRS 1	PHO	570 m	MPC · JPL
820015	2014 OR_{426}	—	July 31, 2014	Haleakala	Pan-STARRS 1	·	920 m	MPC · JPL
820016	2014 OB_{427}	—	July 25, 2014	Haleakala	Pan-STARRS 1	·	2.3 km	MPC · JPL
820017	2014 OM_{427}	—	July 28, 2014	Haleakala	Pan-STARRS 1	MAS	520 m	MPC · JPL
820018	2014 OU_{431}	—	July 31, 2014	Haleakala	Pan-STARRS 1	·	820 m	MPC · JPL
820019	2014 OR_{432}	—	July 31, 2014	Haleakala	Pan-STARRS 1	·	1.3 km	MPC · JPL
820020	2014 OL_{433}	—	July 26, 2014	Haleakala	Pan-STARRS 1	VER	2.3 km	MPC · JPL
820021	2014 OQ_{435}	—	July 29, 2014	Haleakala	Pan-STARRS 1	·	2.0 km	MPC · JPL
820022	2014 OD_{436}	—	July 6, 2014	Haleakala	Pan-STARRS 1	·	1.1 km	MPC · JPL
820023	2014 ON_{447}	—	July 25, 2014	Haleakala	Pan-STARRS 1	·	1.0 km	MPC · JPL
820024	2014 OK_{462}	—	July 31, 2014	Haleakala	Pan-STARRS 1	·	570 m	MPC · JPL
820025	2014 OQ_{481}	—	March 15, 2007	Kitt Peak	Spacewatch	THM	1.9 km	MPC · JPL
820026	2014 PO_{1}	—	June 21, 2014	Haleakala	Pan-STARRS 1	EUN	920 m	MPC · JPL
820027	2014 PQ_{4}	—	June 28, 2014	Kitt Peak	Spacewatch	·	860 m	MPC · JPL
820028	2014 PL_{8}	—	June 29, 2014	Haleakala	Pan-STARRS 1	·	2.8 km	MPC · JPL
820029	2014 PE_{11}	—	August 4, 2014	Haleakala	Pan-STARRS 1	·	890 m	MPC · JPL
820030	2014 PB_{13}	—	July 25, 2014	Haleakala	Pan-STARRS 1	·	1.3 km	MPC · JPL
820031	2014 PT_{13}	—	September 22, 2003	Kitt Peak	Spacewatch	·	2.4 km	MPC · JPL
820032	2014 PE_{14}	—	October 17, 2010	Mount Lemmon	Mount Lemmon Survey	AGN	820 m	MPC · JPL
820033	2014 PF_{14}	—	July 25, 2014	Haleakala	Pan-STARRS 1	NYS	890 m	MPC · JPL
820034	2014 PC_{15}	—	September 19, 2003	Kitt Peak	Spacewatch	·	2.2 km	MPC · JPL
820035	2014 PU_{15}	—	June 24, 2014	Haleakala	Pan-STARRS 1	·	2.1 km	MPC · JPL
820036	2014 PC_{16}	—	July 25, 2014	Haleakala	Pan-STARRS 1	MAS	550 m	MPC · JPL
820037	2014 PF_{18}	—	July 6, 2014	Haleakala	Pan-STARRS 1	·	720 m	MPC · JPL
820038	2014 PL_{18}	—	July 25, 2014	Haleakala	Pan-STARRS 1	MAS	500 m	MPC · JPL
820039	2014 PP_{19}	—	September 19, 1998	Sacramento Peak	SDSS	·	2.4 km	MPC · JPL
820040	2014 PT_{19}	—	July 25, 2014	Haleakala	Pan-STARRS 1	MAS	530 m	MPC · JPL
820041	2014 PK_{20}	—	October 26, 2009	Kitt Peak	Spacewatch	·	1.7 km	MPC · JPL
820042	2014 PP_{26}	—	June 28, 2014	Haleakala	Pan-STARRS 1	VER	2.1 km	MPC · JPL
820043	2014 PQ_{26}	—	September 21, 2003	Kitt Peak	Spacewatch	·	780 m	MPC · JPL
820044	2014 PU_{30}	—	August 4, 2014	Haleakala	Pan-STARRS 1	·	960 m	MPC · JPL
820045	2014 PJ_{31}	—	August 4, 2014	Haleakala	Pan-STARRS 1	·	730 m	MPC · JPL
820046	2014 PD_{36}	—	February 16, 2013	Mount Lemmon	Mount Lemmon Survey	NYS	880 m	MPC · JPL
820047	2014 PK_{37}	—	February 2, 2008	Kitt Peak	Spacewatch	H	400 m	MPC · JPL
820048	2014 PH_{38}	—	October 19, 2003	Kitt Peak	Spacewatch	MAS	550 m	MPC · JPL
820049	2014 PL_{44}	—	December 3, 2010	Kitt Peak	Spacewatch	·	3.6 km	MPC · JPL
820050	2014 PK_{46}	—	July 26, 2014	ESA OGS	ESA OGS	MAS	600 m	MPC · JPL
820051	2014 PF_{47}	—	July 6, 2014	Haleakala	Pan-STARRS 1	·	730 m	MPC · JPL
820052	2014 PH_{48}	—	July 25, 2014	Haleakala	Pan-STARRS 1	·	1.8 km	MPC · JPL
820053	2014 PK_{50}	—	September 26, 1995	Kitt Peak	Spacewatch	·	810 m	MPC · JPL
820054	2014 PX_{63}	—	July 1, 2014	Haleakala	Pan-STARRS 1	TIR	1.9 km	MPC · JPL
820055	2014 PK_{65}	—	July 2, 2014	Kitt Peak	Spacewatch	LIX	2.4 km	MPC · JPL
820056	2014 PT_{66}	—	July 10, 2014	Haleakala	Pan-STARRS 1	·	1.3 km	MPC · JPL
820057	2014 PR_{77}	—	February 19, 2012	Kitt Peak	Spacewatch	(7605)	3.2 km	MPC · JPL
820058	2014 PH_{78}	—	July 1, 2014	Haleakala	Pan-STARRS 1	·	1.9 km	MPC · JPL
820059	2014 PX_{78}	—	August 4, 2003	Kitt Peak	Spacewatch	·	2.1 km	MPC · JPL
820060	2014 PC_{79}	—	July 28, 2014	Haleakala	Pan-STARRS 1	NYS	760 m	MPC · JPL
820061	2014 PA_{80}	—	December 16, 2007	Mount Lemmon	Mount Lemmon Survey	·	810 m	MPC · JPL
820062	2014 PK_{84}	—	August 3, 2014	Haleakala	Pan-STARRS 1	·	1.9 km	MPC · JPL
820063	2014 PV_{84}	—	August 3, 2014	Haleakala	Pan-STARRS 1	EUN	910 m	MPC · JPL
820064	2014 PU_{85}	—	August 3, 2014	Haleakala	Pan-STARRS 1	·	1.3 km	MPC · JPL
820065	2014 PA_{87}	—	August 4, 2014	Haleakala	Pan-STARRS 1	·	1.0 km	MPC · JPL
820066	2014 PE_{87}	—	August 1, 2014	Haleakala	Pan-STARRS 1	NYS	760 m	MPC · JPL
820067	2014 PL_{88}	—	August 3, 2014	Haleakala	Pan-STARRS 1	·	1.8 km	MPC · JPL
820068	2014 PA_{89}	—	August 3, 2014	Haleakala	Pan-STARRS 1	·	950 m	MPC · JPL
820069	2014 PV_{90}	—	August 3, 2014	Haleakala	Pan-STARRS 1	HYG	1.9 km	MPC · JPL
820070	2014 PY_{91}	—	August 15, 2014	Haleakala	Pan-STARRS 1	·	2.6 km	MPC · JPL
820071	2014 PW_{95}	—	August 3, 2014	Haleakala	Pan-STARRS 1	·	760 m	MPC · JPL
820072	2014 PZ_{95}	—	August 5, 2014	Haleakala	Pan-STARRS 1	·	850 m	MPC · JPL
820073	2014 QH_{2}	—	August 18, 2014	Haleakala	Pan-STARRS 1	BAR	860 m	MPC · JPL
820074	2014 QS_{3}	—	March 26, 2006	Mount Lemmon	Mount Lemmon Survey	NYS	840 m	MPC · JPL
820075	2014 QB_{4}	—	May 6, 2014	Haleakala	Pan-STARRS 1	·	1.6 km	MPC · JPL
820076	2014 QD_{11}	—	August 18, 2014	Haleakala	Pan-STARRS 1	·	2.1 km	MPC · JPL
820077	2014 QO_{11}	—	June 3, 2014	Haleakala	Pan-STARRS 1	·	1.5 km	MPC · JPL
820078	2014 QK_{14}	—	June 30, 2014	Haleakala	Pan-STARRS 1	·	2.1 km	MPC · JPL
820079	2014 QF_{16}	—	August 18, 2014	Haleakala	Pan-STARRS 1	·	2.1 km	MPC · JPL
820080	2014 QX_{19}	—	August 6, 2014	Haleakala	Pan-STARRS 1	V	520 m	MPC · JPL
820081	2014 QE_{22}	—	November 26, 2011	Mount Lemmon	Mount Lemmon Survey	·	730 m	MPC · JPL
820082	2014 QD_{23}	—	July 7, 2014	Haleakala	Pan-STARRS 1	·	960 m	MPC · JPL
820083	2014 QK_{24}	—	October 12, 2009	Mount Lemmon	Mount Lemmon Survey	·	2.3 km	MPC · JPL
820084	2014 QH_{25}	—	January 7, 2006	Kitt Peak	Spacewatch	EOS	1.4 km	MPC · JPL
820085	2014 QJ_{28}	—	July 27, 2014	Haleakala	Pan-STARRS 1	·	1.2 km	MPC · JPL
820086	2014 QN_{28}	—	August 6, 2014	Haleakala	Pan-STARRS 1	·	2.3 km	MPC · JPL
820087	2014 QA_{29}	—	June 28, 2014	Mount Lemmon	Mount Lemmon Survey	TIR	2.2 km	MPC · JPL
820088	2014 QH_{29}	—	August 18, 2014	Haleakala	Pan-STARRS 1	·	2.0 km	MPC · JPL
820089	2014 QU_{29}	—	August 18, 2014	Haleakala	Pan-STARRS 1	PHO	670 m	MPC · JPL
820090	2014 QX_{33}	—	August 22, 2014	Haleakala	Pan-STARRS 1	AMO	340 m	MPC · JPL
820091	2014 QF_{35}	—	June 30, 2014	Haleakala	Pan-STARRS 1	PHO	660 m	MPC · JPL
820092	2014 QK_{37}	—	October 2, 2010	Kitt Peak	Spacewatch	·	970 m	MPC · JPL
820093	2014 QW_{38}	—	July 3, 2014	Haleakala	Pan-STARRS 1	·	2.1 km	MPC · JPL
820094	2014 QX_{41}	—	September 18, 2009	Kitt Peak	Spacewatch	·	2.4 km	MPC · JPL
820095	2014 QK_{48}	—	July 4, 2014	Haleakala	Pan-STARRS 1	·	2.3 km	MPC · JPL
820096	2014 QK_{54}	—	July 7, 2014	Haleakala	Pan-STARRS 1	·	1.9 km	MPC · JPL
820097	2014 QT_{65}	—	September 16, 2009	Catalina	CSS	·	2.4 km	MPC · JPL
820098	2014 QN_{68}	—	August 20, 2014	Haleakala	Pan-STARRS 1	(22805)	3.1 km	MPC · JPL
820099	2014 QQ_{68}	—	June 3, 2014	Haleakala	Pan-STARRS 1	·	1 km	MPC · JPL
820100	2014 QE_{81}	—	June 24, 2014	Haleakala	Pan-STARRS 1	·	2.3 km	MPC · JPL

== 820101–820200 ==
back to top

Designation			Discovery			Properties		Ref
Permanent	Provisional	Named after	Date	Site	Discoverer(s)	Category	Diam.	Ref
820101	2014 QB_{87}	—	July 1, 2014	Haleakala	Pan-STARRS 1	·	1.7 km	MPC · JPL
820102	2014 QW_{90}	—	July 30, 2014	Kitt Peak	Spacewatch	·	1.2 km	MPC · JPL
820103	2014 QY_{94}	—	August 20, 2014	Haleakala	Pan-STARRS 1	TEL	1.1 km	MPC · JPL
820104	2014 QU_{97}	—	June 26, 2014	Haleakala	Pan-STARRS 1	·	1.3 km	MPC · JPL
820105	2014 QH_{103}	—	August 20, 2014	Haleakala	Pan-STARRS 1	·	2.4 km	MPC · JPL
820106	2014 QO_{103}	—	August 20, 2014	Haleakala	Pan-STARRS 1	TIR	1.6 km	MPC · JPL
820107	2014 QW_{110}	—	May 8, 2013	Haleakala	Pan-STARRS 1	·	2.5 km	MPC · JPL
820108	2014 QW_{111}	—	June 23, 2014	Mount Lemmon	Mount Lemmon Survey	·	2.6 km	MPC · JPL
820109	2014 QR_{113}	—	July 1, 2014	Haleakala	Pan-STARRS 1	LIX	2.4 km	MPC · JPL
820110	2014 QF_{118}	—	August 20, 2014	Haleakala	Pan-STARRS 1	·	710 m	MPC · JPL
820111	2014 QE_{120}	—	September 25, 2003	Mauna Kea	P. A. Wiegert	·	1.8 km	MPC · JPL
820112	2014 QW_{120}	—	April 21, 2009	Mount Lemmon	Mount Lemmon Survey	·	1.1 km	MPC · JPL
820113	2014 QF_{122}	—	February 14, 2013	ESA OGS	ESA OGS	·	1.0 km	MPC · JPL
820114	2014 QT_{122}	—	August 20, 2014	Haleakala	Pan-STARRS 1	·	710 m	MPC · JPL
820115	2014 QY_{128}	—	August 20, 2014	Haleakala	Pan-STARRS 1	·	1.2 km	MPC · JPL
820116	2014 QL_{129}	—	March 6, 2013	Haleakala	Pan-STARRS 1	·	950 m	MPC · JPL
820117	2014 QC_{130}	—	August 20, 2014	Haleakala	Pan-STARRS 1	(1298)	2.0 km	MPC · JPL
820118	2014 QP_{139}	—	February 14, 2013	Haleakala	Pan-STARRS 1	·	570 m	MPC · JPL
820119	2014 QS_{147}	—	September 3, 2010	Mount Lemmon	Mount Lemmon Survey	·	1.2 km	MPC · JPL
820120	2014 QH_{154}	—	July 1, 2014	Haleakala	Pan-STARRS 1	·	2.1 km	MPC · JPL
820121	2014 QF_{157}	—	June 29, 2014	Haleakala	Pan-STARRS 1	·	1.1 km	MPC · JPL
820122	2014 QP_{162}	—	October 12, 2010	Mount Lemmon	Mount Lemmon Survey	·	1.4 km	MPC · JPL
820123	2014 QE_{166}	—	June 24, 2014	Haleakala	Pan-STARRS 1	·	830 m	MPC · JPL
820124	2014 QX_{167}	—	August 22, 2014	Haleakala	Pan-STARRS 1	EUN	930 m	MPC · JPL
820125	2014 QZ_{168}	—	August 20, 2014	Haleakala	Pan-STARRS 1	T_{j} (2.96) · EUP	3.1 km	MPC · JPL
820126	2014 QY_{171}	—	July 7, 2014	Haleakala	Pan-STARRS 1	·	480 m	MPC · JPL
820127	2014 QW_{172}	—	March 21, 2001	Kitt Peak	SKADS	·	1.5 km	MPC · JPL
820128	2014 QD_{173}	—	January 29, 2012	Kitt Peak	Spacewatch	·	2.7 km	MPC · JPL
820129	2014 QS_{175}	—	September 15, 2010	Mount Lemmon	Mount Lemmon Survey	·	760 m	MPC · JPL
820130	2014 QJ_{179}	—	July 31, 2014	Haleakala	Pan-STARRS 1	·	870 m	MPC · JPL
820131	2014 QR_{182}	—	October 8, 2007	Mount Lemmon	Mount Lemmon Survey	·	650 m	MPC · JPL
820132	2014 QL_{185}	—	September 19, 2009	Kitt Peak	Spacewatch	·	2.3 km	MPC · JPL
820133	2014 QZ_{187}	—	July 6, 2014	Haleakala	Pan-STARRS 1	·	700 m	MPC · JPL
820134	2014 QU_{196}	—	June 23, 2014	Mount Lemmon	Mount Lemmon Survey	·	2.0 km	MPC · JPL
820135	2014 QE_{200}	—	June 24, 2014	Haleakala	Pan-STARRS 1	GEF	1.0 km	MPC · JPL
820136	2014 QW_{203}	—	September 21, 2003	Anderson Mesa	LONEOS	·	880 m	MPC · JPL
820137	2014 QS_{207}	—	June 9, 2014	Mount Lemmon	Mount Lemmon Survey	·	1.3 km	MPC · JPL
820138	2014 QN_{210}	—	August 22, 2014	Haleakala	Pan-STARRS 1	MAS	490 m	MPC · JPL
820139	2014 QD_{212}	—	August 22, 2014	Haleakala	Pan-STARRS 1	·	430 m	MPC · JPL
820140	2014 QF_{213}	—	November 2, 2010	Mount Lemmon	Mount Lemmon Survey	·	1.3 km	MPC · JPL
820141	2014 QC_{220}	—	August 22, 2014	Haleakala	Pan-STARRS 1	·	520 m	MPC · JPL
820142	2014 QA_{221}	—	August 22, 2014	Haleakala	Pan-STARRS 1	·	530 m	MPC · JPL
820143	2014 QN_{224}	—	January 30, 2011	Mount Lemmon	Mount Lemmon Survey	EOS	1.3 km	MPC · JPL
820144	2014 QY_{224}	—	September 25, 2003	Palomar	NEAT	·	1.1 km	MPC · JPL
820145	2014 QO_{227}	—	August 5, 2014	Haleakala	Pan-STARRS 1	·	940 m	MPC · JPL
820146	2014 QL_{230}	—	September 2, 2010	Mount Lemmon	Mount Lemmon Survey	·	780 m	MPC · JPL
820147	2014 QS_{230}	—	August 26, 2003	Cerro Tololo	Deep Ecliptic Survey	·	2.2 km	MPC · JPL
820148	2014 QY_{230}	—	October 22, 2003	Kitt Peak	Spacewatch	NYS	820 m	MPC · JPL
820149	2014 QP_{231}	—	August 20, 2014	Haleakala	Pan-STARRS 1	AEO	840 m	MPC · JPL
820150	2014 QZ_{232}	—	June 24, 2014	Haleakala	Pan-STARRS 1	·	1.0 km	MPC · JPL
820151	2014 QF_{238}	—	August 20, 2014	Haleakala	Pan-STARRS 1	·	270 m	MPC · JPL
820152	2014 QF_{241}	—	March 13, 2013	Mount Lemmon	Mount Lemmon Survey	NYS	860 m	MPC · JPL
820153	2014 QV_{243}	—	September 16, 2010	Mount Lemmon	Mount Lemmon Survey	JUN	770 m	MPC · JPL
820154	2014 QW_{247}	—	December 30, 2007	Mount Lemmon	Mount Lemmon Survey	·	860 m	MPC · JPL
820155	2014 QE_{248}	—	October 30, 1999	Kitt Peak	Spacewatch	·	780 m	MPC · JPL
820156	2014 QD_{252}	—	February 5, 2011	Mount Lemmon	Mount Lemmon Survey	(31811)	2.1 km	MPC · JPL
820157	2014 QN_{264}	—	July 28, 2008	Mount Lemmon	Mount Lemmon Survey	T_{j} (2.97)	2.5 km	MPC · JPL
820158	2014 QG_{265}	—	July 7, 2014	Haleakala	Pan-STARRS 1	·	850 m	MPC · JPL
820159	2014 QP_{265}	—	June 30, 2014	Haleakala	Pan-STARRS 1	TIR	2.4 km	MPC · JPL
820160	2014 QQ_{265}	—	August 19, 2014	Mayhill-ISON	L. Elenin	·	580 m	MPC · JPL
820161	2014 QG_{266}	—	August 28, 2009	Catalina	CSS	H	390 m	MPC · JPL
820162	2014 QX_{267}	—	August 19, 2014	Haleakala	Pan-STARRS 1	·	2.6 km	MPC · JPL
820163	2014 QV_{270}	—	July 1, 2014	Haleakala	Pan-STARRS 1	·	2.4 km	MPC · JPL
820164	2014 QQ_{272}	—	February 21, 2007	Kitt Peak	Spacewatch	·	1.7 km	MPC · JPL
820165	2014 QM_{273}	—	March 2, 2009	Kitt Peak	Spacewatch	·	1.1 km	MPC · JPL
820166	2014 QX_{274}	—	February 10, 2005	La Silla	A. Boattini, H. Scholl	·	2.0 km	MPC · JPL
820167	2014 QW_{281}	—	July 25, 2014	Haleakala	Pan-STARRS 1	THM	1.6 km	MPC · JPL
820168	2014 QM_{282}	—	November 18, 2011	Mount Lemmon	Mount Lemmon Survey	·	640 m	MPC · JPL
820169	2014 QB_{284}	—	October 11, 2010	Mount Lemmon	Mount Lemmon Survey	EUN	880 m	MPC · JPL
820170	2014 QY_{284}	—	August 25, 2014	Haleakala	Pan-STARRS 1	·	2.0 km	MPC · JPL
820171	2014 QD_{285}	—	August 25, 2014	Haleakala	Pan-STARRS 1	·	890 m	MPC · JPL
820172	2014 QL_{285}	—	August 25, 2014	Haleakala	Pan-STARRS 1	TIR	2.6 km	MPC · JPL
820173	2014 QY_{287}	—	August 25, 2014	Haleakala	Pan-STARRS 1	·	2.1 km	MPC · JPL
820174	2014 QZ_{290}	—	August 25, 2014	Haleakala	Pan-STARRS 1	·	2.1 km	MPC · JPL
820175	2014 QG_{294}	—	November 6, 2010	Mount Lemmon	Mount Lemmon Survey	·	1.3 km	MPC · JPL
820176	2014 QD_{297}	—	August 28, 2003	Palomar	NEAT	·	1.0 km	MPC · JPL
820177	2014 QO_{299}	—	September 12, 2009	ESA OGS	ESA OGS	·	2.0 km	MPC · JPL
820178	2014 QN_{303}	—	September 18, 2003	Kitt Peak	Spacewatch	·	820 m	MPC · JPL
820179	2014 QH_{305}	—	April 3, 2010	Kitt Peak	Spacewatch	·	650 m	MPC · JPL
820180	2014 QE_{306}	—	March 8, 2013	Haleakala	Pan-STARRS 1	·	1.3 km	MPC · JPL
820181	2014 QD_{307}	—	March 8, 2013	Haleakala	Pan-STARRS 1	·	1.8 km	MPC · JPL
820182	2014 QD_{311}	—	July 10, 2014	Haleakala	Pan-STARRS 1	·	2.5 km	MPC · JPL
820183	2014 QR_{312}	—	June 29, 2014	Haleakala	Pan-STARRS 1	PHO	710 m	MPC · JPL
820184	2014 QJ_{313}	—	July 25, 2014	Haleakala	Pan-STARRS 1	·	640 m	MPC · JPL
820185	2014 QJ_{321}	—	September 15, 2009	Kitt Peak	Spacewatch	GEF	900 m	MPC · JPL
820186	2014 QZ_{323}	—	August 25, 2014	Haleakala	Pan-STARRS 1	GEF	930 m	MPC · JPL
820187	2014 QW_{330}	—	September 28, 2003	Anderson Mesa	LONEOS	NYS	810 m	MPC · JPL
820188	2014 QS_{337}	—	June 29, 2014	Haleakala	Pan-STARRS 1	·	2.4 km	MPC · JPL
820189	2014 QJ_{339}	—	July 28, 2014	Haleakala	Pan-STARRS 1	·	650 m	MPC · JPL
820190	2014 QO_{341}	—	June 2, 2008	Mount Lemmon	Mount Lemmon Survey	·	1.7 km	MPC · JPL
820191	2014 QU_{344}	—	October 19, 2003	Palomar	NEAT	·	840 m	MPC · JPL
820192	2014 QY_{345}	—	October 24, 2009	Mount Lemmon	Mount Lemmon Survey	TIR	2.4 km	MPC · JPL
820193	2014 QR_{346}	—	June 28, 2014	Haleakala	Pan-STARRS 1	·	990 m	MPC · JPL
820194	2014 QK_{348}	—	September 19, 2003	Kitt Peak	Spacewatch	TIR	2.2 km	MPC · JPL
820195	2014 QA_{349}	—	February 3, 2006	Mauna Kea	P. A. Wiegert, R. Rasmussen	·	1.9 km	MPC · JPL
820196	2014 QC_{349}	—	February 21, 2007	Kitt Peak	Spacewatch	·	2.6 km	MPC · JPL
820197	2014 QG_{349}	—	July 31, 2014	Haleakala	Pan-STARRS 1	·	790 m	MPC · JPL
820198	2014 QS_{351}	—	October 22, 2005	Kitt Peak	Spacewatch	·	1.3 km	MPC · JPL
820199	2014 QB_{352}	—	July 31, 2014	Haleakala	Pan-STARRS 1	NYS	900 m	MPC · JPL
820200	2014 QN_{359}	—	February 8, 2008	Mount Lemmon	Mount Lemmon Survey	H	370 m	MPC · JPL

== 820201–820300 ==
back to top

Designation			Discovery			Properties		Ref
Permanent	Provisional	Named after	Date	Site	Discoverer(s)	Category	Diam.	Ref
820201	2014 QW_{360}	—	April 27, 2012	Haleakala	Pan-STARRS 1	EOS	1.5 km	MPC · JPL
820202	2014 QN_{361}	—	August 27, 2014	Haleakala	Pan-STARRS 1	MAS	680 m	MPC · JPL
820203	2014 QX_{362}	—	June 16, 2014	Mount Lemmon	Mount Lemmon Survey	·	1.8 km	MPC · JPL
820204	2014 QC_{364}	—	August 25, 2014	Haleakala	Pan-STARRS 1	·	370 m	MPC · JPL
820205	2014 QC_{366}	—	August 20, 2014	Haleakala	Pan-STARRS 1	EUN	860 m	MPC · JPL
820206	2014 QT_{366}	—	August 25, 2014	Haleakala	Pan-STARRS 1	·	980 m	MPC · JPL
820207	2014 QA_{372}	—	August 27, 2014	Haleakala	Pan-STARRS 1	·	1.1 km	MPC · JPL
820208	2014 QP_{375}	—	August 27, 2014	Haleakala	Pan-STARRS 1	EUP	2.3 km	MPC · JPL
820209	2014 QM_{376}	—	August 13, 2010	Kitt Peak	Spacewatch	·	940 m	MPC · JPL
820210	2014 QY_{377}	—	July 29, 2014	Haleakala	Pan-STARRS 1	THB	1.9 km	MPC · JPL
820211	2014 QJ_{382}	—	September 19, 2003	Kitt Peak	Spacewatch	·	2.5 km	MPC · JPL
820212	2014 QG_{384}	—	September 18, 2003	Kitt Peak	Spacewatch	·	1.0 km	MPC · JPL
820213	2014 QO_{384}	—	February 12, 2011	Mount Lemmon	Mount Lemmon Survey	·	2.7 km	MPC · JPL
820214	2014 QX_{384}	—	July 30, 2014	Haleakala	Pan-STARRS 1	·	860 m	MPC · JPL
820215	2014 QA_{385}	—	July 1, 2014	Mount Lemmon	Mount Lemmon Survey	PHO	620 m	MPC · JPL
820216	2014 QM_{394}	—	October 21, 2011	Mount Lemmon	Mount Lemmon Survey	·	450 m	MPC · JPL
820217	2014 QC_{395}	—	September 15, 2007	Bergisch Gladbach	W. Bickel	NYS	600 m	MPC · JPL
820218	2014 QB_{398}	—	September 29, 2003	Kitt Peak	Spacewatch	MAS	570 m	MPC · JPL
820219	2014 QT_{402}	—	August 20, 2014	Haleakala	Pan-STARRS 1	·	810 m	MPC · JPL
820220	2014 QH_{404}	—	October 24, 2011	Haleakala	Pan-STARRS 1	·	700 m	MPC · JPL
820221	2014 QD_{408}	—	August 27, 2014	Kislovodsk	V. Nevski, V. Savanevych	TIR	2.5 km	MPC · JPL
820222	2014 QY_{409}	—	June 29, 2014	Haleakala	Pan-STARRS 1	·	1.1 km	MPC · JPL
820223	2014 QM_{410}	—	November 3, 1999	Kitt Peak	Spacewatch	·	790 m	MPC · JPL
820224	2014 QP_{410}	—	August 30, 2014	Mount Lemmon	Mount Lemmon Survey	EUP	2.3 km	MPC · JPL
820225	2014 QY_{412}	—	August 6, 2014	Kitt Peak	Spacewatch	·	830 m	MPC · JPL
820226	2014 QD_{417}	—	February 23, 2012	Mount Lemmon	Mount Lemmon Survey	·	2.1 km	MPC · JPL
820227	2014 QU_{417}	—	January 6, 2008	Mauna Kea	P. A. Wiegert	·	860 m	MPC · JPL
820228	2014 QT_{418}	—	November 1, 2010	Mount Lemmon	Mount Lemmon Survey	RAF	650 m	MPC · JPL
820229	2014 QY_{421}	—	September 10, 2007	Catalina	CSS	·	620 m	MPC · JPL
820230	2014 QB_{422}	—	September 11, 2010	Kitt Peak	Spacewatch	·	1.2 km	MPC · JPL
820231	2014 QJ_{425}	—	July 28, 2014	Haleakala	Pan-STARRS 1	·	1.4 km	MPC · JPL
820232	2014 QM_{426}	—	August 27, 2005	Palomar	NEAT	·	1.7 km	MPC · JPL
820233	2014 QH_{427}	—	August 6, 2014	Haleakala	Pan-STARRS 1	H	380 m	MPC · JPL
820234	2014 QH_{431}	—	September 15, 2006	Kitt Peak	Spacewatch	T_{j} (2.99) · 3:2	3.4 km	MPC · JPL
820235	2014 QT_{432}	—	August 18, 2014	Haleakala	Pan-STARRS 1	·	2.4 km	MPC · JPL
820236	2014 QU_{436}	—	August 30, 2014	Mount Lemmon	Mount Lemmon Survey	V	470 m	MPC · JPL
820237	2014 QF_{440}	—	June 28, 2014	Mount Lemmon	Mount Lemmon Survey	·	1.4 km	MPC · JPL
820238	2014 QB_{443}	—	August 19, 2014	Haleakala	Pan-STARRS 1	H	450 m	MPC · JPL
820239	2014 QE_{454}	—	August 27, 2014	Haleakala	Pan-STARRS 1	TRE	1.6 km	MPC · JPL
820240	2014 QN_{454}	—	August 28, 2014	Haleakala	Pan-STARRS 1	·	1.0 km	MPC · JPL
820241	2014 QR_{455}	—	August 27, 2014	Haleakala	Pan-STARRS 1	·	1.3 km	MPC · JPL
820242	2014 QF_{456}	—	August 31, 2014	Haleakala	Pan-STARRS 1	·	2.0 km	MPC · JPL
820243	2014 QH_{456}	—	December 15, 2009	Mount Lemmon	Mount Lemmon Survey	·	1.7 km	MPC · JPL
820244	2014 QD_{457}	—	August 22, 2014	Haleakala	Pan-STARRS 1	THB	2.2 km	MPC · JPL
820245	2014 QN_{457}	—	October 30, 2010	Piszkés-tető	K. Sárneczky, Z. Kuli	·	1.1 km	MPC · JPL
820246	2014 QM_{459}	—	August 20, 2014	Haleakala	Pan-STARRS 1	·	1.1 km	MPC · JPL
820247	2014 QB_{464}	—	July 4, 2014	Haleakala	Pan-STARRS 1	·	2.4 km	MPC · JPL
820248	2014 QU_{465}	—	August 25, 2014	Haleakala	Pan-STARRS 1	·	960 m	MPC · JPL
820249	2014 QY_{465}	—	August 25, 2014	Haleakala	Pan-STARRS 1	·	1.6 km	MPC · JPL
820250	2014 QM_{466}	—	August 25, 2014	Haleakala	Pan-STARRS 1	·	1.6 km	MPC · JPL
820251	2014 QK_{467}	—	August 26, 2014	Haleakala	Pan-STARRS 1	·	1.6 km	MPC · JPL
820252	2014 QE_{468}	—	April 19, 2013	Haleakala	Pan-STARRS 1	·	1.5 km	MPC · JPL
820253	2014 QL_{468}	—	August 27, 2014	Haleakala	Pan-STARRS 1	EOS	1.5 km	MPC · JPL
820254	2014 QJ_{469}	—	August 27, 2014	Haleakala	Pan-STARRS 1	·	1.1 km	MPC · JPL
820255	2014 QQ_{473}	—	August 31, 2014	Haleakala	Pan-STARRS 1	HYG	2.4 km	MPC · JPL
820256	2014 QT_{475}	—	June 3, 2014	Haleakala	Pan-STARRS 1	·	910 m	MPC · JPL
820257	2014 QU_{476}	—	March 6, 2013	Haleakala	Pan-STARRS 1	·	1.5 km	MPC · JPL
820258	2014 QN_{480}	—	August 20, 2014	Haleakala	Pan-STARRS 1	HYG	2.0 km	MPC · JPL
820259	2014 QQ_{483}	—	August 20, 2014	Haleakala	Pan-STARRS 1	·	2.2 km	MPC · JPL
820260	2014 QB_{488}	—	July 7, 2014	Haleakala	Pan-STARRS 1	·	550 m	MPC · JPL
820261	2014 QR_{494}	—	July 25, 2014	Haleakala	Pan-STARRS 1	·	2.2 km	MPC · JPL
820262	2014 QW_{496}	—	August 27, 2014	Haleakala	Pan-STARRS 1	·	950 m	MPC · JPL
820263	2014 QB_{497}	—	October 20, 2011	Kitt Peak	Spacewatch	·	590 m	MPC · JPL
820264	2014 QE_{498}	—	October 9, 2007	Kitt Peak	Spacewatch	·	500 m	MPC · JPL
820265	2014 QW_{504}	—	August 27, 2014	Haleakala	Pan-STARRS 1	·	1.7 km	MPC · JPL
820266	2014 QJ_{506}	—	August 25, 2014	Haleakala	Pan-STARRS 1	·	2.0 km	MPC · JPL
820267	2014 QN_{506}	—	August 22, 2014	Haleakala	Pan-STARRS 1	·	1.9 km	MPC · JPL
820268	2014 QY_{508}	—	July 30, 2014	Kitt Peak	Spacewatch	NYS	890 m	MPC · JPL
820269	2014 QY_{513}	—	August 19, 2014	Haleakala	Pan-STARRS 1	·	2.0 km	MPC · JPL
820270	2014 QN_{523}	—	August 20, 2014	Haleakala	Pan-STARRS 1	·	550 m	MPC · JPL
820271	2014 QN_{524}	—	August 25, 2014	Haleakala	Pan-STARRS 1	·	1.4 km	MPC · JPL
820272	2014 QO_{524}	—	August 28, 2014	Haleakala	Pan-STARRS 1	·	460 m	MPC · JPL
820273	2014 QZ_{525}	—	August 27, 2014	Haleakala	Pan-STARRS 1	·	2.4 km	MPC · JPL
820274	2014 QE_{526}	—	August 22, 2014	Haleakala	Pan-STARRS 1	·	410 m	MPC · JPL
820275	2014 QL_{526}	—	August 25, 2014	Haleakala	Pan-STARRS 1	·	540 m	MPC · JPL
820276	2014 QT_{529}	—	August 28, 2014	Haleakala	Pan-STARRS 1	·	840 m	MPC · JPL
820277	2014 QE_{530}	—	August 31, 2014	Haleakala	Pan-STARRS 1	LIX	2.3 km	MPC · JPL
820278	2014 QF_{530}	—	August 20, 2014	Haleakala	Pan-STARRS 1	·	780 m	MPC · JPL
820279	2014 QV_{533}	—	August 23, 2014	Haleakala	Pan-STARRS 1	·	2.3 km	MPC · JPL
820280	2014 QF_{537}	—	August 31, 2014	Haleakala	Pan-STARRS 1	·	2.3 km	MPC · JPL
820281	2014 QO_{537}	—	August 25, 2014	Haleakala	Pan-STARRS 1	·	2.4 km	MPC · JPL
820282	2014 QZ_{544}	—	August 30, 2014	Mount Lemmon	Mount Lemmon Survey	·	2.2 km	MPC · JPL
820283	2014 QJ_{569}	—	August 30, 2014	Mount Lemmon	Mount Lemmon Survey	V	480 m	MPC · JPL
820284	2014 QE_{582}	—	August 29, 2014	Mount Lemmon	Mount Lemmon Survey	·	1.0 km	MPC · JPL
820285	2014 QH_{586}	—	August 21, 2014	Haleakala	Pan-STARRS 1	·	1.2 km	MPC · JPL
820286	2014 QY_{598}	—	August 21, 2014	Haleakala	Pan-STARRS 1	·	890 m	MPC · JPL
820287	2014 RU_{2}	—	August 20, 2014	Haleakala	Pan-STARRS 1	·	610 m	MPC · JPL
820288	2014 RO_{3}	—	August 3, 2014	Haleakala	Pan-STARRS 1	·	850 m	MPC · JPL
820289	2014 RZ_{4}	—	September 17, 2004	Kitt Peak	Spacewatch	·	430 m	MPC · JPL
820290	2014 RU_{12}	—	June 7, 2014	Haleakala	Pan-STARRS 1	T_{j} (2.98)	2.7 km	MPC · JPL
820291	2014 RJ_{16}	—	August 30, 2014	Mount Lemmon	Mount Lemmon Survey	·	2.4 km	MPC · JPL
820292	2014 RY_{20}	—	August 31, 2014	Haleakala	Pan-STARRS 1	·	700 m	MPC · JPL
820293	2014 RJ_{23}	—	October 23, 2011	Mount Lemmon	Mount Lemmon Survey	·	480 m	MPC · JPL
820294	2014 RK_{29}	—	December 28, 2011	Mount Lemmon	Mount Lemmon Survey	·	790 m	MPC · JPL
820295	2014 RY_{29}	—	December 15, 2007	Mount Lemmon	Mount Lemmon Survey	NYS	860 m	MPC · JPL
820296	2014 RX_{33}	—	October 22, 2009	Mount Lemmon	Mount Lemmon Survey	·	2.0 km	MPC · JPL
820297	2014 RR_{34}	—	August 28, 2014	Haleakala	Pan-STARRS 1	·	970 m	MPC · JPL
820298	2014 RE_{36}	—	March 6, 2008	Mount Lemmon	Mount Lemmon Survey	NEM	1.9 km	MPC · JPL
820299	2014 RG_{37}	—	December 1, 2003	Kitt Peak	Spacewatch	THM	1.9 km	MPC · JPL
820300	2014 RO_{37}	—	August 19, 2014	Haleakala	Pan-STARRS 1	THM	1.6 km	MPC · JPL

== 820301–820400 ==
back to top

Designation			Discovery			Properties		Ref
Permanent	Provisional	Named after	Date	Site	Discoverer(s)	Category	Diam.	Ref
820301	2014 RH_{38}	—	August 20, 2014	Haleakala	Pan-STARRS 1	·	840 m	MPC · JPL
820302	2014 RW_{48}	—	September 14, 2014	Mount Lemmon	Mount Lemmon Survey	·	1.2 km	MPC · JPL
820303	2014 RN_{50}	—	January 19, 2012	Mount Lemmon	Mount Lemmon Survey	·	460 m	MPC · JPL
820304	2014 RP_{52}	—	September 15, 2014	Mount Lemmon	Mount Lemmon Survey	·	560 m	MPC · JPL
820305	2014 RC_{56}	—	September 15, 2014	Mount Lemmon	Mount Lemmon Survey	·	560 m	MPC · JPL
820306	2014 RZ_{62}	—	September 24, 2003	Palomar	NEAT	·	2.7 km	MPC · JPL
820307	2014 RX_{66}	—	September 6, 2014	Mount Lemmon	Mount Lemmon Survey	HYG	2.5 km	MPC · JPL
820308	2014 RC_{68}	—	September 3, 2014	Mount Lemmon	Mount Lemmon Survey	·	1.3 km	MPC · JPL
820309	2014 RE_{70}	—	September 13, 2014	Haleakala	Pan-STARRS 1	V	550 m	MPC · JPL
820310	2014 RL_{70}	—	September 1, 2014	Mount Lemmon	Mount Lemmon Survey	H	440 m	MPC · JPL
820311	2014 RD_{71}	—	September 1, 2014	Mount Lemmon	Mount Lemmon Survey	·	1.4 km	MPC · JPL
820312	2014 RJ_{71}	—	September 1, 2014	Catalina	CSS	·	2.6 km	MPC · JPL
820313	2014 RL_{71}	—	March 1, 2016	Mount Lemmon	Mount Lemmon Survey	H	450 m	MPC · JPL
820314	2014 RP_{73}	—	September 2, 2014	Haleakala	Pan-STARRS 1	·	670 m	MPC · JPL
820315	2014 RJ_{74}	—	March 16, 2013	Kitt Peak	Spacewatch	·	2.0 km	MPC · JPL
820316	2014 RZ_{77}	—	September 14, 2014	Haleakala	Pan-STARRS 1	·	2.4 km	MPC · JPL
820317	2014 RA_{80}	—	September 2, 2014	Haleakala	Pan-STARRS 1	·	2.6 km	MPC · JPL
820318	2014 RG_{83}	—	September 4, 2014	Haleakala	Pan-STARRS 1	·	550 m	MPC · JPL
820319	2014 SH_{3}	—	September 16, 2014	Haleakala	Pan-STARRS 1	·	910 m	MPC · JPL
820320	2014 SR_{3}	—	September 16, 2014	Haleakala	Pan-STARRS 1	·	1.5 km	MPC · JPL
820321	2014 SV_{8}	—	August 31, 2014	Mount Lemmon	Mount Lemmon Survey	·	480 m	MPC · JPL
820322	2014 SV_{9}	—	August 3, 2014	Haleakala	Pan-STARRS 1	·	2.5 km	MPC · JPL
820323	2014 SB_{11}	—	October 24, 2011	Haleakala	Pan-STARRS 1	·	420 m	MPC · JPL
820324	2014 SZ_{18}	—	February 14, 2013	Kitt Peak	Spacewatch	MAS	620 m	MPC · JPL
820325	2014 SL_{22}	—	August 28, 2014	Kitt Peak	Spacewatch	V	470 m	MPC · JPL
820326	2014 SB_{41}	—	September 1, 2014	Catalina	CSS	·	850 m	MPC · JPL
820327	2014 SF_{43}	—	March 15, 2007	Kitt Peak	Spacewatch	·	2.3 km	MPC · JPL
820328	2014 SP_{48}	—	August 28, 2014	Haleakala	Pan-STARRS 1	·	2.6 km	MPC · JPL
820329	2014 SK_{57}	—	May 8, 2010	Mount Lemmon	Mount Lemmon Survey	·	610 m	MPC · JPL
820330	2014 SV_{57}	—	September 2, 2014	Haleakala	Pan-STARRS 1	SUL	1.4 km	MPC · JPL
820331	2014 SS_{66}	—	July 30, 2014	Haleakala	Pan-STARRS 1	·	2.3 km	MPC · JPL
820332	2014 SU_{66}	—	August 28, 2014	Haleakala	Pan-STARRS 1	·	1.9 km	MPC · JPL
820333	2014 SZ_{71}	—	August 28, 2014	Haleakala	Pan-STARRS 1	·	450 m	MPC · JPL
820334	2014 SK_{73}	—	August 28, 2014	Haleakala	Pan-STARRS 1	·	530 m	MPC · JPL
820335	2014 SX_{82}	—	September 18, 2014	Haleakala	Pan-STARRS 1	TIR	2.2 km	MPC · JPL
820336	2014 SZ_{89}	—	September 18, 2014	Haleakala	Pan-STARRS 1	EOS	1.2 km	MPC · JPL
820337	2014 SS_{95}	—	October 13, 2006	Kitt Peak	Spacewatch	(5)	710 m	MPC · JPL
820338	2014 SE_{103}	—	September 12, 2007	Mount Lemmon	Mount Lemmon Survey	V	470 m	MPC · JPL
820339	2014 SR_{108}	—	September 2, 2014	Kitt Peak	Spacewatch	·	2.0 km	MPC · JPL
820340	2014 SM_{109}	—	September 18, 2014	Haleakala	Pan-STARRS 1	EUN	650 m	MPC · JPL
820341	2014 SA_{110}	—	October 21, 2006	Kitt Peak	Spacewatch	·	900 m	MPC · JPL
820342	2014 SM_{110}	—	September 18, 2014	Haleakala	Pan-STARRS 1	(5)	780 m	MPC · JPL
820343	2014 ST_{129}	—	August 27, 2014	Haleakala	Pan-STARRS 1	·	510 m	MPC · JPL
820344	2014 SX_{135}	—	October 22, 2003	Kitt Peak	Spacewatch	·	2.2 km	MPC · JPL
820345	2014 SV_{140}	—	June 9, 2014	Mount Lemmon	Mount Lemmon Survey	T_{j} (2.99)	3.1 km	MPC · JPL
820346	2014 SL_{150}	—	August 20, 2014	Haleakala	Pan-STARRS 1	·	470 m	MPC · JPL
820347	2014 SC_{151}	—	September 19, 2014	Haleakala	Pan-STARRS 1	·	910 m	MPC · JPL
820348	2014 SO_{151}	—	September 19, 2014	Haleakala	Pan-STARRS 1	·	1.5 km	MPC · JPL
820349	2014 SS_{154}	—	September 19, 2014	Haleakala	Pan-STARRS 1	·	480 m	MPC · JPL
820350	2014 SB_{162}	—	September 19, 2014	Haleakala	Pan-STARRS 1	·	670 m	MPC · JPL
820351	2014 ST_{184}	—	February 28, 2012	Haleakala	Pan-STARRS 1	·	780 m	MPC · JPL
820352	2014 SY_{190}	—	October 9, 2008	Mount Lemmon	Mount Lemmon Survey	·	2.3 km	MPC · JPL
820353	2014 SV_{191}	—	October 21, 2006	Mount Lemmon	Mount Lemmon Survey	·	720 m	MPC · JPL
820354	2014 SP_{192}	—	August 20, 2014	Haleakala	Pan-STARRS 1	3:2	3.4 km	MPC · JPL
820355	2014 ST_{198}	—	July 31, 2014	Haleakala	Pan-STARRS 1	EOS	1.5 km	MPC · JPL
820356	2014 SW_{200}	—	July 29, 2014	Haleakala	Pan-STARRS 1	·	1.4 km	MPC · JPL
820357	2014 SL_{220}	—	September 20, 2014	Haleakala	Pan-STARRS 1	·	890 m	MPC · JPL
820358	2014 SX_{227}	—	September 18, 2004	Siding Spring	SSS	·	510 m	MPC · JPL
820359	2014 SK_{230}	—	September 14, 2014	Mount Lemmon	Mount Lemmon Survey	·	2.3 km	MPC · JPL
820360	2014 SP_{230}	—	September 14, 2014	Kitt Peak	Spacewatch	·	2.0 km	MPC · JPL
820361	2014 SL_{235}	—	August 27, 2014	Haleakala	Pan-STARRS 1	·	1.3 km	MPC · JPL
820362	2014 SW_{235}	—	July 30, 2014	Haleakala	Pan-STARRS 1	·	2.1 km	MPC · JPL
820363	2014 SW_{237}	—	May 30, 2014	Mount Lemmon	Mount Lemmon Survey	·	2.4 km	MPC · JPL
820364	2014 SB_{243}	—	July 31, 2014	Haleakala	Pan-STARRS 1	·	900 m	MPC · JPL
820365	2014 SJ_{246}	—	September 22, 2014	Haleakala	Pan-STARRS 1	MAR	660 m	MPC · JPL
820366	2014 SP_{247}	—	September 22, 2014	Haleakala	Pan-STARRS 1	·	1.6 km	MPC · JPL
820367	2014 SF_{249}	—	August 20, 2014	Haleakala	Pan-STARRS 1	V	500 m	MPC · JPL
820368	2014 SP_{255}	—	September 23, 2014	Mount Lemmon	Mount Lemmon Survey	·	1.0 km	MPC · JPL
820369	2014 SE_{257}	—	October 15, 2003	Palomar	NEAT	ERI	1.2 km	MPC · JPL
820370	2014 SU_{259}	—	September 2, 2014	Kitt Peak	Spacewatch	·	500 m	MPC · JPL
820371	2014 SC_{263}	—	September 20, 2014	Catalina	CSS	THB	2.6 km	MPC · JPL
820372	2014 SN_{273}	—	October 16, 2009	Mount Lemmon	Mount Lemmon Survey	·	1.5 km	MPC · JPL
820373	2014 SE_{278}	—	August 29, 2014	Kitt Peak	Spacewatch	·	670 m	MPC · JPL
820374	2014 SW_{286}	—	November 2, 2010	Mount Lemmon	Mount Lemmon Survey	·	1.0 km	MPC · JPL
820375	2014 SX_{286}	—	September 20, 2003	Palomar	NEAT	·	3.2 km	MPC · JPL
820376	2014 SF_{290}	—	September 24, 2014	Mount Lemmon	Mount Lemmon Survey	PHO	620 m	MPC · JPL
820377	2014 SC_{295}	—	April 9, 2013	Haleakala	Pan-STARRS 1	·	980 m	MPC · JPL
820378	2014 SK_{296}	—	August 28, 2014	Haleakala	Pan-STARRS 1	·	1.1 km	MPC · JPL
820379	2014 SD_{300}	—	September 25, 2014	Kitt Peak	Spacewatch	·	500 m	MPC · JPL
820380	2014 SO_{301}	—	October 21, 2007	Mount Lemmon	Mount Lemmon Survey	·	980 m	MPC · JPL
820381	2014 SU_{302}	—	August 19, 2014	Haleakala	Pan-STARRS 1	·	590 m	MPC · JPL
820382	2014 ST_{304}	—	September 28, 2003	Kitt Peak	Spacewatch	·	2.3 km	MPC · JPL
820383	2014 SE_{305}	—	May 23, 2001	Cerro Tololo	Deep Ecliptic Survey	·	520 m	MPC · JPL
820384	2014 SP_{312}	—	July 1, 2014	Mount Lemmon	Mount Lemmon Survey	BAR	980 m	MPC · JPL
820385	2014 SP_{314}	—	July 29, 2014	Haleakala	Pan-STARRS 1	·	1.0 km	MPC · JPL
820386	2014 ST_{315}	—	September 2, 2014	Haleakala	Pan-STARRS 1	NYS	1.1 km	MPC · JPL
820387	2014 SM_{321}	—	September 18, 2014	Haleakala	Pan-STARRS 1	·	2.1 km	MPC · JPL
820388	2014 SY_{323}	—	August 27, 2014	Haleakala	Pan-STARRS 1	·	1.2 km	MPC · JPL
820389	2014 SA_{327}	—	July 29, 2014	Haleakala	Pan-STARRS 1	·	490 m	MPC · JPL
820390	2014 SK_{329}	—	September 28, 2014	Westfield	International Astronomical Search Collaboration	·	1.1 km	MPC · JPL
820391	2014 ST_{333}	—	October 19, 2003	Kitt Peak	Spacewatch	NYS	940 m	MPC · JPL
820392	2014 SM_{334}	—	August 22, 2004	Kitt Peak	Spacewatch	·	480 m	MPC · JPL
820393	2014 SY_{337}	—	September 13, 2007	Mount Lemmon	Mount Lemmon Survey	·	540 m	MPC · JPL
820394	2014 SU_{338}	—	August 31, 2000	Kitt Peak	Spacewatch	·	470 m	MPC · JPL
820395	2014 SY_{342}	—	September 29, 2014	Haleakala	Pan-STARRS 1	·	1.5 km	MPC · JPL
820396	2014 SF_{343}	—	September 29, 2014	Haleakala	Pan-STARRS 1	·	2.2 km	MPC · JPL
820397	2014 SO_{343}	—	September 19, 2014	Haleakala	Pan-STARRS 1	HYG	2.3 km	MPC · JPL
820398	2014 SQ_{346}	—	September 30, 2014	Kitt Peak	Spacewatch	·	2.0 km	MPC · JPL
820399	2014 SD_{347}	—	September 19, 2014	Haleakala	Pan-STARRS 1	·	760 m	MPC · JPL
820400	2014 ST_{355}	—	September 25, 2014	Kitt Peak	Spacewatch	·	1.4 km	MPC · JPL

== 820401–820500 ==
back to top

Designation			Discovery			Properties		Ref
Permanent	Provisional	Named after	Date	Site	Discoverer(s)	Category	Diam.	Ref
820401	2014 SZ_{361}	—	September 24, 2014	Mount Lemmon	Mount Lemmon Survey	·	1.9 km	MPC · JPL
820402	2014 SW_{362}	—	September 25, 2014	Kitt Peak	Spacewatch	EOS	1.3 km	MPC · JPL
820403	2014 SH_{368}	—	September 25, 2014	Mount Lemmon	Mount Lemmon Survey	·	2.4 km	MPC · JPL
820404	2014 SA_{370}	—	September 19, 2014	Haleakala	Pan-STARRS 1	·	2.3 km	MPC · JPL
820405	2014 SC_{370}	—	September 19, 2014	Haleakala	Pan-STARRS 1	·	1.4 km	MPC · JPL
820406	2014 SJ_{374}	—	March 7, 2017	Haleakala	Pan-STARRS 1	·	1.7 km	MPC · JPL
820407	2014 SL_{374}	—	September 19, 2014	Haleakala	Pan-STARRS 1	·	1.9 km	MPC · JPL
820408	2014 SR_{374}	—	January 2, 2017	Haleakala	Pan-STARRS 1	·	2.7 km	MPC · JPL
820409	2014 SG_{382}	—	September 18, 2014	Haleakala	Pan-STARRS 1	·	690 m	MPC · JPL
820410	2014 SN_{383}	—	September 22, 2014	Haleakala	Pan-STARRS 1	·	1.6 km	MPC · JPL
820411	2014 SY_{383}	—	September 27, 2014	Mount Lemmon	Mount Lemmon Survey	·	1.8 km	MPC · JPL
820412	2014 SF_{388}	—	September 18, 2014	Haleakala	Pan-STARRS 1	·	2.2 km	MPC · JPL
820413	2014 SS_{389}	—	September 19, 2014	Haleakala	Pan-STARRS 1	T_{j} (2.94)	2.5 km	MPC · JPL
820414	2014 SR_{391}	—	September 25, 2014	Mount Lemmon	Mount Lemmon Survey	·	1.6 km	MPC · JPL
820415	2014 SV_{404}	—	September 19, 2014	Haleakala	Pan-STARRS 1	·	2.7 km	MPC · JPL
820416	2014 ST_{410}	—	September 19, 2014	Haleakala	Pan-STARRS 1	·	2.5 km	MPC · JPL
820417	2014 SE_{412}	—	September 19, 2014	Haleakala	Pan-STARRS 1	·	950 m	MPC · JPL
820418	2014 SW_{412}	—	January 30, 2011	Mount Lemmon	Mount Lemmon Survey	·	1.6 km	MPC · JPL
820419	2014 TF	—	September 20, 2014	Catalina	CSS	·	650 m	MPC · JPL
820420	2014 TZ_{1}	—	September 1, 2014	Mount Lemmon	Mount Lemmon Survey	·	1.1 km	MPC · JPL
820421	2014 TN_{4}	—	September 18, 2003	Palomar	NEAT	T_{j} (2.99)	1.9 km	MPC · JPL
820422	2014 TJ_{5}	—	October 1, 2014	Kitt Peak	Spacewatch	·	1.3 km	MPC · JPL
820423	2014 TF_{6}	—	September 2, 2014	Haleakala	Pan-STARRS 1	·	2.1 km	MPC · JPL
820424	2014 TU_{6}	—	September 2, 2014	Haleakala	Pan-STARRS 1	·	530 m	MPC · JPL
820425	2014 TZ_{6}	—	October 21, 2003	Socorro	LINEAR	·	2.4 km	MPC · JPL
820426	2014 TZ_{11}	—	September 13, 2007	Mount Lemmon	Mount Lemmon Survey	·	480 m	MPC · JPL
820427	2014 TE_{13}	—	September 25, 2014	Kitt Peak	Spacewatch	·	2.0 km	MPC · JPL
820428	2014 TH_{15}	—	October 10, 2007	Mount Lemmon	Mount Lemmon Survey	·	570 m	MPC · JPL
820429	2014 TK_{18}	—	October 11, 2010	Piszkés-tető	K. Sárneczky, G. Mező	·	730 m	MPC · JPL
820430	2014 TV_{18}	—	October 1, 2014	Kitt Peak	Spacewatch	(5)	940 m	MPC · JPL
820431	2014 TB_{19}	—	October 1, 2014	Kitt Peak	Spacewatch	·	1.9 km	MPC · JPL
820432	2014 TB_{26}	—	September 19, 2009	Kitt Peak	Spacewatch	EOS	1.2 km	MPC · JPL
820433	2014 TY_{32}	—	May 6, 2014	Haleakala	Pan-STARRS 1	·	1.4 km	MPC · JPL
820434	2014 TD_{33}	—	October 2, 2014	Haleakala	Pan-STARRS 1	H	310 m	MPC · JPL
820435	2014 TM_{38}	—	October 21, 2003	Kitt Peak	Spacewatch	·	2.1 km	MPC · JPL
820436	2014 TQ_{38}	—	August 25, 2014	Haleakala	Pan-STARRS 1	·	610 m	MPC · JPL
820437	2014 TX_{42}	—	October 4, 2004	Kitt Peak	Spacewatch	·	460 m	MPC · JPL
820438	2014 TT_{52}	—	October 14, 2014	Mount Lemmon	Mount Lemmon Survey	·	980 m	MPC · JPL
820439	2014 TE_{55}	—	August 27, 2014	Haleakala	Pan-STARRS 1	·	690 m	MPC · JPL
820440	2014 TC_{56}	—	October 15, 2014	Kitt Peak	Spacewatch	·	1.4 km	MPC · JPL
820441	2014 TY_{61}	—	October 27, 2003	Kitt Peak	Spacewatch	·	940 m	MPC · JPL
820442	2014 TX_{63}	—	September 28, 2001	Palomar	NEAT	EUN	910 m	MPC · JPL
820443	2014 TD_{69}	—	November 29, 1999	Kitt Peak	Spacewatch	·	780 m	MPC · JPL
820444	2014 TE_{72}	—	October 20, 2003	Kitt Peak	Spacewatch	·	980 m	MPC · JPL
820445	2014 TP_{84}	—	October 1, 2014	Haleakala	Pan-STARRS 1	·	780 m	MPC · JPL
820446	2014 TH_{87}	—	October 3, 2014	Mount Lemmon	Mount Lemmon Survey	·	970 m	MPC · JPL
820447	2014 TM_{88}	—	November 11, 2007	Mount Lemmon	Mount Lemmon Survey	·	990 m	MPC · JPL
820448	2014 TA_{89}	—	October 2, 2014	Haleakala	Pan-STARRS 1	·	2.7 km	MPC · JPL
820449	2014 TB_{90}	—	November 21, 2009	Kitt Peak	Spacewatch	VER	2.0 km	MPC · JPL
820450	2014 TC_{93}	—	October 2, 2014	Haleakala	Pan-STARRS 1	·	930 m	MPC · JPL
820451	2014 TY_{95}	—	October 2, 2014	Haleakala	Pan-STARRS 1	·	3.0 km	MPC · JPL
820452	2014 TO_{96}	—	September 19, 2008	Kitt Peak	Spacewatch	·	2.7 km	MPC · JPL
820453	2014 TA_{97}	—	October 5, 2014	Haleakala	Pan-STARRS 1	EUP	2.4 km	MPC · JPL
820454	2014 TD_{98}	—	October 8, 2014	Haleakala	Pan-STARRS 1	·	3.6 km	MPC · JPL
820455	2014 TU_{105}	—	October 1, 2014	Mount Lemmon	Mount Lemmon Survey	·	850 m	MPC · JPL
820456	2014 TA_{106}	—	October 1, 2014	Haleakala	Pan-STARRS 1	·	520 m	MPC · JPL
820457	2014 TR_{107}	—	October 3, 2014	Mount Lemmon	Mount Lemmon Survey	·	880 m	MPC · JPL
820458	2014 TZ_{107}	—	October 4, 2014	Mount Lemmon	Mount Lemmon Survey	(5931)	2.9 km	MPC · JPL
820459	2014 TU_{112}	—	October 1, 2014	Catalina	CSS	·	580 m	MPC · JPL
820460	2014 TB_{119}	—	October 3, 2014	Mount Lemmon	Mount Lemmon Survey	·	620 m	MPC · JPL
820461	2014 UQ_{2}	—	September 26, 2008	Mount Lemmon	Mount Lemmon Survey	·	2.2 km	MPC · JPL
820462	2014 UA_{3}	—	December 29, 2008	Mount Lemmon	Mount Lemmon Survey	·	490 m	MPC · JPL
820463	2014 UZ_{7}	—	September 20, 2009	Kitt Peak	Spacewatch	H	260 m	MPC · JPL
820464	2014 UU_{12}	—	April 11, 2013	Haleakala	Pan-STARRS 1	·	1.1 km	MPC · JPL
820465	2014 UR_{13}	—	October 10, 2008	Mount Lemmon	Mount Lemmon Survey	·	2.1 km	MPC · JPL
820466	2014 UZ_{14}	—	October 19, 2007	Kitt Peak	Spacewatch	·	570 m	MPC · JPL
820467	2014 UL_{15}	—	October 17, 2014	Mount Lemmon	Mount Lemmon Survey	·	2.4 km	MPC · JPL
820468	2014 UL_{27}	—	September 20, 2014	Haleakala	Pan-STARRS 1	·	700 m	MPC · JPL
820469	2014 UC_{36}	—	October 2, 2014	Haleakala	Pan-STARRS 1	·	1.3 km	MPC · JPL
820470	2014 UR_{36}	—	October 18, 2014	Mount Lemmon	Mount Lemmon Survey	·	700 m	MPC · JPL
820471	2014 UW_{37}	—	September 30, 2010	Mount Lemmon	Mount Lemmon Survey	·	1.0 km	MPC · JPL
820472	2014 UH_{40}	—	October 9, 1999	Kitt Peak	Spacewatch	·	850 m	MPC · JPL
820473	2014 UM_{40}	—	October 27, 2005	Mount Lemmon	Mount Lemmon Survey	·	1.3 km	MPC · JPL
820474	2014 UY_{42}	—	October 3, 2014	Mount Lemmon	Mount Lemmon Survey	·	1.6 km	MPC · JPL
820475	2014 UF_{44}	—	December 2, 2005	Kitt Peak	Spacewatch	·	1.2 km	MPC · JPL
820476	2014 UQ_{46}	—	October 21, 2003	Kitt Peak	Spacewatch	·	2.3 km	MPC · JPL
820477	2014 UV_{51}	—	September 29, 1973	Palomar Mountain	C. J. van Houten, I. van Houten-Groeneveld, T. Gehrels	·	930 m	MPC · JPL
820478	2014 UV_{52}	—	October 22, 2014	Mount Lemmon	Mount Lemmon Survey	·	830 m	MPC · JPL
820479	2014 UL_{53}	—	September 29, 2003	Socorro	LINEAR	·	2.0 km	MPC · JPL
820480	2014 US_{53}	—	November 19, 2003	Kitt Peak	Spacewatch	NYS	1 km	MPC · JPL
820481	2014 UN_{54}	—	October 24, 2009	Kitt Peak	Spacewatch	·	1.4 km	MPC · JPL
820482	2014 UL_{65}	—	September 25, 2014	Kitt Peak	Spacewatch	·	1.1 km	MPC · JPL
820483	2014 UQ_{66}	—	October 20, 2014	Mount Lemmon	Mount Lemmon Survey	·	520 m	MPC · JPL
820484	2014 UL_{83}	—	September 4, 2014	Haleakala	Pan-STARRS 1	HNS	840 m	MPC · JPL
820485	2014 UV_{83}	—	March 17, 2012	Mount Lemmon	Mount Lemmon Survey	·	660 m	MPC · JPL
820486	2014 UY_{85}	—	October 22, 2003	Kitt Peak	Spacewatch	·	1.6 km	MPC · JPL
820487	2014 UE_{88}	—	October 22, 2014	Kitt Peak	Spacewatch	·	2.0 km	MPC · JPL
820488	2014 UK_{89}	—	October 22, 2014	Mount Lemmon	Mount Lemmon Survey	·	680 m	MPC · JPL
820489	2014 UC_{91}	—	September 19, 2009	Mount Lemmon	Mount Lemmon Survey	·	2.1 km	MPC · JPL
820490	2014 UJ_{93}	—	October 22, 2014	Mount Lemmon	Mount Lemmon Survey	·	880 m	MPC · JPL
820491	2014 UP_{93}	—	October 22, 2014	Mount Lemmon	Mount Lemmon Survey	(5)	800 m	MPC · JPL
820492	2014 UG_{96}	—	August 20, 2003	Campo Imperatore	CINEOS	·	1.7 km	MPC · JPL
820493	2014 UW_{96}	—	October 23, 2014	Kitt Peak	Spacewatch	·	520 m	MPC · JPL
820494	2014 UL_{99}	—	October 3, 2014	Mount Lemmon	Mount Lemmon Survey	·	900 m	MPC · JPL
820495	2014 UE_{102}	—	October 20, 2007	Mount Lemmon	Mount Lemmon Survey	·	810 m	MPC · JPL
820496	2014 UG_{104}	—	September 29, 2014	Haleakala	Pan-STARRS 1	V	490 m	MPC · JPL
820497	2014 UX_{104}	—	September 19, 2014	Haleakala	Pan-STARRS 1	·	2.2 km	MPC · JPL
820498	2014 UY_{105}	—	October 11, 2007	Kitt Peak	Spacewatch	·	540 m	MPC · JPL
820499	2014 UF_{108}	—	September 7, 2014	Haleakala	Pan-STARRS 1	·	2.6 km	MPC · JPL
820500	2014 UC_{112}	—	March 11, 2005	Kitt Peak	Deep Ecliptic Survey	NYS	950 m	MPC · JPL

== 820501–820600 ==
back to top

Designation			Discovery			Properties		Ref
Permanent	Provisional	Named after	Date	Site	Discoverer(s)	Category	Diam.	Ref
820501	2014 UL_{113}	—	November 18, 2007	Kitt Peak	Spacewatch	·	680 m	MPC · JPL
820502	2014 UX_{115}	—	September 22, 2014	Haleakala	Pan-STARRS 1	H	330 m	MPC · JPL
820503	2014 UA_{127}	—	October 23, 2014	Mount Lemmon	Mount Lemmon Survey	·	1.9 km	MPC · JPL
820504	2014 UF_{131}	—	October 28, 2003	Bergisch Gladbach	W. Bickel	·	2.1 km	MPC · JPL
820505	2014 UK_{139}	—	September 23, 2011	Mount Lemmon	Mount Lemmon Survey	·	520 m	MPC · JPL
820506	2014 UJ_{154}	—	October 25, 2014	Mount Lemmon	Mount Lemmon Survey	·	560 m	MPC · JPL
820507	2014 UO_{155}	—	September 2, 2014	Haleakala	Pan-STARRS 1	·	2.5 km	MPC · JPL
820508	2014 UA_{159}	—	October 25, 2014	Haleakala	Pan-STARRS 1	H	370 m	MPC · JPL
820509	2014 UZ_{162}	—	October 25, 2014	Haleakala	Pan-STARRS 1	·	540 m	MPC · JPL
820510	2014 UM_{163}	—	September 18, 2010	Kitt Peak	Spacewatch	NYS	830 m	MPC · JPL
820511	2014 UK_{164}	—	September 27, 2003	Kitt Peak	Spacewatch	·	900 m	MPC · JPL
820512	2014 UA_{168}	—	October 26, 2014	Mount Lemmon	Mount Lemmon Survey	EUP	2.5 km	MPC · JPL
820513	2014 UD_{169}	—	October 26, 2014	Mount Lemmon	Mount Lemmon Survey	·	1.0 km	MPC · JPL
820514	2014 UD_{183}	—	October 25, 2014	Haleakala	Pan-STARRS 1	PHO	660 m	MPC · JPL
820515	2014 UR_{183}	—	October 25, 2014	Haleakala	Pan-STARRS 1	·	450 m	MPC · JPL
820516	2014 UM_{186}	—	September 25, 2014	Kitt Peak	Spacewatch	·	2.4 km	MPC · JPL
820517	2014 UY_{188}	—	April 27, 2012	Haleakala	Pan-STARRS 1	·	2.9 km	MPC · JPL
820518	2014 UJ_{189}	—	October 22, 2014	Catalina	CSS	·	1.3 km	MPC · JPL
820519	2014 UN_{189}	—	November 17, 2009	Mount Lemmon	Mount Lemmon Survey	·	2.2 km	MPC · JPL
820520	2014 UW_{190}	—	September 2, 2014	Haleakala	Pan-STARRS 1	EUN	1.0 km	MPC · JPL
820521	2014 UG_{208}	—	September 9, 2010	La Sagra	OAM	·	960 m	MPC · JPL
820522	2014 UX_{209}	—	September 29, 2009	Mount Lemmon	Mount Lemmon Survey	·	1.3 km	MPC · JPL
820523	2014 UT_{210}	—	July 24, 2017	Haleakala	Pan-STARRS 1	·	480 m	MPC · JPL
820524	2014 UW_{219}	—	May 25, 2007	Mount Lemmon	Mount Lemmon Survey	·	3.0 km	MPC · JPL
820525	2014 UJ_{222}	—	November 26, 2014	Mount Lemmon	Mount Lemmon Survey	T_{j} (2.97)	3.4 km	MPC · JPL
820526	2014 UP_{222}	—	October 30, 2014	Mount Lemmon	Mount Lemmon Survey	·	2.3 km	MPC · JPL
820527	2014 UF_{227}	—	October 5, 2014	Mount Lemmon	Mount Lemmon Survey	·	1.6 km	MPC · JPL
820528	2014 UH_{235}	—	October 24, 2014	Kitt Peak	Spacewatch	·	1.2 km	MPC · JPL
820529	2014 UE_{236}	—	April 30, 2012	Kitt Peak	Spacewatch	·	1.2 km	MPC · JPL
820530	2014 UF_{238}	—	October 28, 2014	Haleakala	Pan-STARRS 1	·	750 m	MPC · JPL
820531	2014 UB_{246}	—	October 25, 2014	Kitt Peak	Spacewatch	·	1.7 km	MPC · JPL
820532	2014 UX_{247}	—	October 29, 2014	Haleakala	Pan-STARRS 1	·	1.0 km	MPC · JPL
820533	2014 UH_{248}	—	October 25, 2014	Haleakala	Pan-STARRS 1	·	1.8 km	MPC · JPL
820534	2014 UJ_{248}	—	March 6, 2016	Haleakala	Pan-STARRS 1	V	460 m	MPC · JPL
820535	2014 UC_{251}	—	January 20, 2018	Haleakala	Pan-STARRS 1	L5	6.2 km	MPC · JPL
820536	2014 UQ_{251}	—	October 26, 2014	Mount Lemmon	Mount Lemmon Survey	·	1.2 km	MPC · JPL
820537	2014 UK_{254}	—	October 25, 2014	Mount Lemmon	Mount Lemmon Survey	·	1.9 km	MPC · JPL
820538	2014 UN_{255}	—	October 23, 2014	Kitt Peak	Spacewatch	·	1.1 km	MPC · JPL
820539	2014 UX_{257}	—	October 29, 2014	Haleakala	Pan-STARRS 1	PHO	860 m	MPC · JPL
820540	2014 UU_{258}	—	October 26, 2014	Haleakala	Pan-STARRS 1	·	1.2 km	MPC · JPL
820541	2014 UO_{259}	—	October 22, 2014	Mount Lemmon	Mount Lemmon Survey	ADE	1.4 km	MPC · JPL
820542	2014 UY_{260}	—	October 28, 2014	Haleakala	Pan-STARRS 1	·	1.5 km	MPC · JPL
820543	2014 UA_{265}	—	October 20, 2014	Mount Lemmon	Mount Lemmon Survey	·	1.4 km	MPC · JPL
820544	2014 UO_{274}	—	October 26, 2014	Mount Lemmon	Mount Lemmon Survey	·	1.2 km	MPC · JPL
820545	2014 UD_{281}	—	October 30, 2014	Mount Lemmon	Mount Lemmon Survey	·	1.5 km	MPC · JPL
820546	2014 VA_{3}	—	September 16, 2009	Kitt Peak	Spacewatch	·	1.6 km	MPC · JPL
820547	2014 VG_{6}	—	July 31, 2014	Haleakala	Pan-STARRS 1	NYS	940 m	MPC · JPL
820548	2014 VQ_{9}	—	September 23, 2008	Catalina	CSS	·	2.4 km	MPC · JPL
820549	2014 VZ_{9}	—	July 13, 2010	Kitt Peak	Spacewatch	·	1.4 km	MPC · JPL
820550	2014 VU_{11}	—	October 23, 2003	Kitt Peak	Spacewatch	·	830 m	MPC · JPL
820551	2014 VX_{17}	—	September 22, 2008	Kitt Peak	Spacewatch	THM	1.9 km	MPC · JPL
820552	2014 VJ_{18}	—	October 23, 2009	Mount Lemmon	Mount Lemmon Survey	·	2.0 km	MPC · JPL
820553	2014 VW_{21}	—	October 5, 2014	Mount Lemmon	Mount Lemmon Survey	·	1.2 km	MPC · JPL
820554	2014 VG_{22}	—	October 25, 2014	Mount Lemmon	Mount Lemmon Survey	H	370 m	MPC · JPL
820555	2014 VR_{26}	—	September 30, 2003	Kitt Peak	Spacewatch	·	840 m	MPC · JPL
820556	2014 VZ_{27}	—	October 11, 2007	Kitt Peak	Spacewatch	·	480 m	MPC · JPL
820557	2014 VF_{30}	—	September 4, 2014	Haleakala	Pan-STARRS 1	·	2.6 km	MPC · JPL
820558	2014 VS_{32}	—	November 17, 2001	Kitt Peak	Deep Lens Survey	EUN	800 m	MPC · JPL
820559	2014 VV_{33}	—	October 21, 2014	Kitt Peak	Spacewatch	·	390 m	MPC · JPL
820560	2014 VJ_{34}	—	October 25, 2014	Haleakala	Pan-STARRS 1	·	1.3 km	MPC · JPL
820561	2014 VK_{39}	—	April 27, 2012	Mount Lemmon	Mount Lemmon Survey	·	3.7 km	MPC · JPL
820562	2014 VN_{40}	—	November 15, 2014	Mount Lemmon	Mount Lemmon Survey	·	2.0 km	MPC · JPL
820563	2014 VE_{41}	—	November 11, 2014	Kitt Peak	Spacewatch	·	820 m	MPC · JPL
820564	2014 VH_{41}	—	November 10, 2014	Haleakala	Pan-STARRS 1	·	2.5 km	MPC · JPL
820565	2014 WC	—	November 16, 2014	Mount Lemmon	Mount Lemmon Survey	L5	7.0 km	MPC · JPL
820566	2014 WF_{1}	—	October 18, 2014	Mount Lemmon	Mount Lemmon Survey	·	460 m	MPC · JPL
820567	2014 WG_{4}	—	September 25, 2014	Mount Lemmon	Mount Lemmon Survey	·	1 km	MPC · JPL
820568	2014 WB_{7}	—	November 18, 2014	Haleakala	Pan-STARRS 1	BAR	1.6 km	MPC · JPL
820569	2014 WZ_{12}	—	February 24, 2008	Mount Lemmon	Mount Lemmon Survey	·	810 m	MPC · JPL
820570	2014 WB_{18}	—	November 16, 2014	Mount Lemmon	Mount Lemmon Survey	L5	9.4 km	MPC · JPL
820571	2014 WM_{20}	—	May 30, 2013	Mount Lemmon	Mount Lemmon Survey	·	1.6 km	MPC · JPL
820572	2014 WL_{30}	—	September 6, 2008	Mount Lemmon	Mount Lemmon Survey	THM	1.8 km	MPC · JPL
820573	2014 WA_{31}	—	August 31, 2014	Haleakala	Pan-STARRS 1	·	1.4 km	MPC · JPL
820574	2014 WK_{32}	—	October 28, 2014	Haleakala	Pan-STARRS 1	·	2.2 km	MPC · JPL
820575	2014 WA_{33}	—	October 28, 2014	Haleakala	Pan-STARRS 1	·	1.5 km	MPC · JPL
820576	2014 WF_{34}	—	October 28, 2014	Haleakala	Pan-STARRS 1	·	940 m	MPC · JPL
820577	2014 WL_{34}	—	September 26, 2014	Mount Lemmon	Mount Lemmon Survey	·	1.0 km	MPC · JPL
820578	2014 WP_{34}	—	August 31, 2014	Haleakala	Pan-STARRS 1	·	780 m	MPC · JPL
820579	2014 WE_{38}	—	November 17, 2014	Haleakala	Pan-STARRS 1	·	1.3 km	MPC · JPL
820580	2014 WG_{42}	—	October 8, 2010	Kitt Peak	Spacewatch	MAS	500 m	MPC · JPL
820581	2014 WA_{44}	—	November 24, 2003	Kitt Peak	Spacewatch	NYS	780 m	MPC · JPL
820582	2014 WS_{45}	—	September 16, 2009	Kitt Peak	Spacewatch	(13314)	1.3 km	MPC · JPL
820583	2014 WT_{45}	—	October 21, 2014	Mount Lemmon	Mount Lemmon Survey	EOS	1.3 km	MPC · JPL
820584	2014 WW_{54}	—	October 16, 2014	Mount Lemmon	Mount Lemmon Survey	·	870 m	MPC · JPL
820585	2014 WP_{57}	—	June 4, 2013	Haleakala	Pan-STARRS 1	·	790 m	MPC · JPL
820586	2014 WW_{61}	—	August 31, 2014	Haleakala	Pan-STARRS 1	BRG	1.1 km	MPC · JPL
820587	2014 WC_{62}	—	September 20, 2014	Haleakala	Pan-STARRS 1	HYG	2.3 km	MPC · JPL
820588	2014 WR_{62}	—	August 31, 2014	Haleakala	Pan-STARRS 1	·	660 m	MPC · JPL
820589	2014 WS_{63}	—	October 14, 2014	Kitt Peak	Spacewatch	·	810 m	MPC · JPL
820590	2014 WJ_{65}	—	August 31, 2014	Haleakala	Pan-STARRS 1	·	980 m	MPC · JPL
820591	2014 WC_{80}	—	September 18, 2014	Haleakala	Pan-STARRS 1	·	1.5 km	MPC · JPL
820592	2014 WM_{90}	—	December 27, 2006	Mount Lemmon	Mount Lemmon Survey	·	1.0 km	MPC · JPL
820593	2014 WY_{90}	—	October 21, 2014	Mount Lemmon	Mount Lemmon Survey	MAR	660 m	MPC · JPL
820594	2014 WD_{97}	—	November 17, 2014	Mount Lemmon	Mount Lemmon Survey	·	2.5 km	MPC · JPL
820595	2014 WD_{99}	—	October 18, 2014	Kitt Peak	Spacewatch	·	490 m	MPC · JPL
820596	2014 WN_{100}	—	November 17, 2014	Mount Lemmon	Mount Lemmon Survey	·	2.5 km	MPC · JPL
820597	2014 WA_{112}	—	October 18, 2014	Mount Lemmon	Mount Lemmon Survey	·	870 m	MPC · JPL
820598	2014 WW_{113}	—	August 28, 2014	Haleakala	Pan-STARRS 1	·	970 m	MPC · JPL
820599	2014 WC_{117}	—	October 21, 2003	Kitt Peak	Spacewatch	·	2.1 km	MPC · JPL
820600	2014 WJ_{118}	—	November 19, 2014	Mount Lemmon	Mount Lemmon Survey	H	460 m	MPC · JPL

== 820601–820700 ==
back to top

Designation			Discovery			Properties		Ref
Permanent	Provisional	Named after	Date	Site	Discoverer(s)	Category	Diam.	Ref
820601	2014 WP_{120}	—	November 3, 2014	Mount Lemmon	Mount Lemmon Survey	H	380 m	MPC · JPL
820602	2014 WG_{142}	—	November 5, 2005	Kitt Peak	Spacewatch	·	1.3 km	MPC · JPL
820603	2014 WF_{146}	—	December 25, 2011	Mount Lemmon	Mount Lemmon Survey	·	450 m	MPC · JPL
820604	2014 WN_{146}	—	October 15, 1999	Kitt Peak	Spacewatch	MAS	560 m	MPC · JPL
820605	2014 WR_{147}	—	October 22, 2009	Mount Lemmon	Mount Lemmon Survey	·	1.6 km	MPC · JPL
820606	2014 WS_{152}	—	August 31, 2014	Haleakala	Pan-STARRS 1	GEF	950 m	MPC · JPL
820607	2014 WP_{161}	—	October 25, 2014	Haleakala	Pan-STARRS 1	·	970 m	MPC · JPL
820608	2014 WB_{179}	—	October 13, 2014	Catalina	CSS	·	540 m	MPC · JPL
820609	2014 WX_{185}	—	October 30, 2014	Mount Lemmon	Mount Lemmon Survey	·	1.2 km	MPC · JPL
820610	2014 WB_{186}	—	October 30, 2014	Mount Lemmon	Mount Lemmon Survey	LIX	2.5 km	MPC · JPL
820611	2014 WL_{186}	—	September 22, 2008	Kitt Peak	Spacewatch	·	2.1 km	MPC · JPL
820612	2014 WF_{193}	—	September 4, 2008	Kitt Peak	Spacewatch	TIR	2.1 km	MPC · JPL
820613	2014 WF_{194}	—	November 21, 2014	Mount Lemmon	Mount Lemmon Survey	EOS	1.5 km	MPC · JPL
820614	2014 WW_{197}	—	November 21, 2014	Haleakala	Pan-STARRS 1	·	990 m	MPC · JPL
820615	2014 WF_{202}	—	May 10, 2011	Siding Spring	SSS	·	1.5 km	MPC · JPL
820616	2014 WO_{212}	—	October 29, 2014	Haleakala	Pan-STARRS 1	·	2.3 km	MPC · JPL
820617	2014 WF_{213}	—	October 18, 2007	Kitt Peak	Spacewatch	V	530 m	MPC · JPL
820618	2014 WT_{220}	—	February 10, 2008	Kitt Peak	Spacewatch	·	960 m	MPC · JPL
820619	2014 WW_{227}	—	November 21, 2009	Kitt Peak	Spacewatch	·	1.3 km	MPC · JPL
820620	2014 WD_{228}	—	August 21, 2006	Kitt Peak	Spacewatch	NYS	850 m	MPC · JPL
820621	2014 WW_{238}	—	November 20, 2014	Haleakala	Pan-STARRS 1	EUN	760 m	MPC · JPL
820622	2014 WZ_{240}	—	November 20, 2014	Mount Lemmon	Mount Lemmon Survey	·	1.3 km	MPC · JPL
820623	2014 WX_{255}	—	November 21, 2014	Haleakala	Pan-STARRS 1	·	1.2 km	MPC · JPL
820624	2014 WM_{258}	—	November 21, 2014	Haleakala	Pan-STARRS 1	·	790 m	MPC · JPL
820625	2014 WU_{260}	—	November 21, 2014	Haleakala	Pan-STARRS 1	·	1.8 km	MPC · JPL
820626	2014 WN_{265}	—	November 21, 2014	Haleakala	Pan-STARRS 1	·	3.2 km	MPC · JPL
820627	2014 WX_{272}	—	October 21, 2003	Kitt Peak	Spacewatch	·	670 m	MPC · JPL
820628	2014 WA_{274}	—	November 21, 2014	Haleakala	Pan-STARRS 1	·	880 m	MPC · JPL
820629	2014 WU_{277}	—	November 21, 2014	Haleakala	Pan-STARRS 1	·	1.3 km	MPC · JPL
820630	2014 WO_{282}	—	November 21, 2014	Haleakala	Pan-STARRS 1	ADE	1.2 km	MPC · JPL
820631	2014 WV_{291}	—	November 21, 2014	Haleakala	Pan-STARRS 1	PHO	720 m	MPC · JPL
820632	2014 WO_{293}	—	November 21, 2014	Haleakala	Pan-STARRS 1	·	1.2 km	MPC · JPL
820633	2014 WG_{295}	—	November 21, 2014	Haleakala	Pan-STARRS 1	·	1.4 km	MPC · JPL
820634	2014 WM_{296}	—	November 21, 2014	Haleakala	Pan-STARRS 1	·	2.2 km	MPC · JPL
820635	2014 WS_{297}	—	November 21, 2014	Haleakala	Pan-STARRS 1	·	740 m	MPC · JPL
820636	2014 WK_{301}	—	September 12, 2014	Haleakala	Pan-STARRS 1	·	1.6 km	MPC · JPL
820637	2014 WN_{301}	—	August 23, 2014	Haleakala	Pan-STARRS 1	·	1.4 km	MPC · JPL
820638	2014 WY_{305}	—	October 30, 2014	Mount Lemmon	Mount Lemmon Survey	·	1.2 km	MPC · JPL
820639	2014 WS_{307}	—	November 22, 2014	Mount Lemmon	Mount Lemmon Survey	EOS	1.4 km	MPC · JPL
820640	2014 WL_{309}	—	October 25, 2014	Mount Lemmon	Mount Lemmon Survey	·	700 m	MPC · JPL
820641	2014 WR_{321}	—	November 22, 2014	Haleakala	Pan-STARRS 1	·	560 m	MPC · JPL
820642	2014 WD_{324}	—	November 22, 2014	Haleakala	Pan-STARRS 1	·	720 m	MPC · JPL
820643	2014 WD_{326}	—	September 23, 2008	Mount Lemmon	Mount Lemmon Survey	·	2.2 km	MPC · JPL
820644	2014 WK_{329}	—	November 22, 2014	Haleakala	Pan-STARRS 1	EOS	1.3 km	MPC · JPL
820645	2014 WV_{336}	—	March 28, 2012	Kitt Peak	Spacewatch	HNS	720 m	MPC · JPL
820646	2014 WW_{338}	—	January 8, 2010	Kitt Peak	Spacewatch	LIX	2.2 km	MPC · JPL
820647	2014 WP_{344}	—	November 22, 2014	Haleakala	Pan-STARRS 1	·	2.0 km	MPC · JPL
820648	2014 WY_{347}	—	November 22, 2014	Haleakala	Pan-STARRS 1	·	1.4 km	MPC · JPL
820649	2014 WG_{348}	—	April 19, 2012	Mount Lemmon	Mount Lemmon Survey	·	1.3 km	MPC · JPL
820650	2014 WP_{360}	—	November 24, 2014	Mount Lemmon	Mount Lemmon Survey	BRG	1.3 km	MPC · JPL
820651	2014 WC_{370}	—	November 25, 2014	Mount Lemmon	Mount Lemmon Survey	H	350 m	MPC · JPL
820652	2014 WS_{372}	—	September 6, 2008	Kitt Peak	Spacewatch	·	1.7 km	MPC · JPL
820653	2014 WU_{378}	—	November 22, 2014	Haleakala	Pan-STARRS 1	HNS	1.0 km	MPC · JPL
820654	2014 WT_{379}	—	November 22, 2014	Haleakala	Pan-STARRS 1	·	1.2 km	MPC · JPL
820655	2014 WJ_{387}	—	November 23, 2014	Haleakala	Pan-STARRS 1	·	750 m	MPC · JPL
820656	2014 WD_{397}	—	August 25, 2014	Haleakala	Pan-STARRS 1	·	970 m	MPC · JPL
820657	2014 WH_{399}	—	November 25, 2014	Mount Lemmon	Mount Lemmon Survey	PHO	740 m	MPC · JPL
820658	2014 WD_{405}	—	January 2, 2011	Mount Lemmon	Mount Lemmon Survey	·	900 m	MPC · JPL
820659	2014 WC_{408}	—	November 26, 2014	Haleakala	Pan-STARRS 1	·	450 m	MPC · JPL
820660	2014 WV_{411}	—	March 16, 2012	Haleakala	Pan-STARRS 1	·	770 m	MPC · JPL
820661	2014 WO_{412}	—	January 18, 2009	Kitt Peak	Spacewatch	·	550 m	MPC · JPL
820662	2014 WA_{416}	—	October 8, 2007	Mount Lemmon	Mount Lemmon Survey	·	460 m	MPC · JPL
820663	2014 WX_{420}	—	September 19, 2008	Kitt Peak	Spacewatch	·	1.7 km	MPC · JPL
820664	2014 WM_{432}	—	November 27, 2014	Mount Lemmon	Mount Lemmon Survey	·	1.7 km	MPC · JPL
820665	2014 WF_{433}	—	January 7, 2010	Kitt Peak	Spacewatch	·	2.0 km	MPC · JPL
820666	2014 WL_{434}	—	November 27, 2014	Mount Lemmon	Mount Lemmon Survey	·	2.1 km	MPC · JPL
820667	2014 WZ_{438}	—	November 27, 2014	Haleakala	Pan-STARRS 1	EOS	1.4 km	MPC · JPL
820668	2014 WE_{444}	—	November 22, 2014	Mount Lemmon	Mount Lemmon Survey	·	760 m	MPC · JPL
820669	2014 WB_{446}	—	June 29, 2005	Kitt Peak	Spacewatch	·	1.0 km	MPC · JPL
820670	2014 WH_{448}	—	October 9, 2010	Mount Lemmon	Mount Lemmon Survey	·	1.1 km	MPC · JPL
820671	2014 WE_{453}	—	November 23, 2014	Haleakala	Pan-STARRS 1	·	800 m	MPC · JPL
820672	2014 WS_{455}	—	November 27, 2014	Haleakala	Pan-STARRS 1	EUN	740 m	MPC · JPL
820673	2014 WZ_{457}	—	May 12, 2013	Mount Lemmon	Mount Lemmon Survey	·	780 m	MPC · JPL
820674	2014 WR_{458}	—	November 17, 2014	Haleakala	Pan-STARRS 1	·	1.2 km	MPC · JPL
820675	2014 WV_{458}	—	October 11, 2007	Kitt Peak	Spacewatch	·	450 m	MPC · JPL
820676	2014 WB_{459}	—	October 25, 2014	Mount Lemmon	Mount Lemmon Survey	·	2.0 km	MPC · JPL
820677	2014 WJ_{476}	—	November 28, 2014	Kitt Peak	Spacewatch	·	2.0 km	MPC · JPL
820678	2014 WQ_{482}	—	October 25, 2008	Mount Lemmon	Mount Lemmon Survey	URS	2.3 km	MPC · JPL
820679	2014 WQ_{486}	—	November 29, 2014	Mount Lemmon	Mount Lemmon Survey	·	2.6 km	MPC · JPL
820680	2014 WG_{488}	—	September 28, 2006	Kitt Peak	Spacewatch	·	1.1 km	MPC · JPL
820681	2014 WQ_{501}	—	September 11, 2014	Haleakala	Pan-STARRS 1	·	2.6 km	MPC · JPL
820682	2014 WK_{505}	—	September 4, 2014	Haleakala	Pan-STARRS 1	·	2.2 km	MPC · JPL
820683	2014 WZ_{507}	—	June 15, 2013	Haleakala	Pan-STARRS 1	·	2.7 km	MPC · JPL
820684	2014 WU_{511}	—	November 25, 2014	Haleakala	Pan-STARRS 1	H	320 m	MPC · JPL
820685	2014 WH_{512}	—	November 26, 2014	Haleakala	Pan-STARRS 1	·	310 m	MPC · JPL
820686	2014 WL_{512}	—	November 26, 2014	Haleakala	Pan-STARRS 1	H	320 m	MPC · JPL
820687	2014 WA_{513}	—	November 22, 2014	Haleakala	Pan-STARRS 1	H	420 m	MPC · JPL
820688	2014 WX_{514}	—	November 27, 2014	Haleakala	Pan-STARRS 1	PHO	930 m	MPC · JPL
820689	2014 WC_{515}	—	November 29, 2014	Haleakala	Pan-STARRS 1	·	1.3 km	MPC · JPL
820690	2014 WW_{517}	—	January 16, 2005	Mauna Kea	Veillet, C.	·	550 m	MPC · JPL
820691	2014 WN_{520}	—	October 21, 2014	Mount Lemmon	Mount Lemmon Survey	·	1.2 km	MPC · JPL
820692	2014 WU_{522}	—	November 17, 2014	Haleakala	Pan-STARRS 1	LIX	2.2 km	MPC · JPL
820693	2014 WC_{529}	—	November 22, 2014	Haleakala	Pan-STARRS 1	·	1.3 km	MPC · JPL
820694	2014 WN_{530}	—	March 24, 2012	Mount Lemmon	Mount Lemmon Survey	·	960 m	MPC · JPL
820695	2014 WW_{533}	—	November 29, 2014	Mount Lemmon	Mount Lemmon Survey	THM	1.6 km	MPC · JPL
820696	2014 WZ_{533}	—	November 29, 2014	Mount Lemmon	Mount Lemmon Survey	·	2.3 km	MPC · JPL
820697	2014 WB_{534}	—	November 29, 2014	Mount Lemmon	Mount Lemmon Survey	EOS	1.3 km	MPC · JPL
820698	2014 WT_{536}	—	November 30, 2014	Haleakala	Pan-STARRS 1	HNS	1.1 km	MPC · JPL
820699	2014 WX_{537}	—	November 17, 2014	Haleakala	Pan-STARRS 1	·	440 m	MPC · JPL
820700	2014 WT_{538}	—	November 26, 2014	Haleakala	Pan-STARRS 1	·	720 m	MPC · JPL

== 820701–820800 ==
back to top

Designation			Discovery			Properties		Ref
Permanent	Provisional	Named after	Date	Site	Discoverer(s)	Category	Diam.	Ref
820701	2014 WQ_{540}	—	November 29, 2014	Haleakala	Pan-STARRS 1	PHO	830 m	MPC · JPL
820702	2014 WD_{541}	—	November 29, 2014	Haleakala	Pan-STARRS 1	T_{j} (2.99) · EUP	2.7 km	MPC · JPL
820703	2014 WS_{542}	—	November 23, 2014	Mount Lemmon	Mount Lemmon Survey	HNS	940 m	MPC · JPL
820704	2014 WF_{544}	—	September 2, 2008	Kitt Peak	Spacewatch	·	2.1 km	MPC · JPL
820705	2014 WZ_{545}	—	November 27, 2014	Mount Lemmon	Mount Lemmon Survey	V	620 m	MPC · JPL
820706	2014 WU_{547}	—	November 26, 2014	Haleakala	Pan-STARRS 1	·	960 m	MPC · JPL
820707	2014 WC_{550}	—	November 21, 2014	Haleakala	Pan-STARRS 1	·	830 m	MPC · JPL
820708	2014 WQ_{550}	—	November 17, 2014	Haleakala	Pan-STARRS 1	·	2.1 km	MPC · JPL
820709	2014 WY_{550}	—	November 26, 2014	Haleakala	Pan-STARRS 1	TIR	2.3 km	MPC · JPL
820710	2014 WA_{554}	—	November 27, 2014	Haleakala	Pan-STARRS 1	·	510 m	MPC · JPL
820711	2014 WC_{563}	—	November 29, 2014	Mount Lemmon	Mount Lemmon Survey	·	1.4 km	MPC · JPL
820712	2014 WA_{568}	—	November 23, 2014	Mount Lemmon	Mount Lemmon Survey	·	550 m	MPC · JPL
820713	2014 WR_{569}	—	November 24, 2014	Haleakala	Pan-STARRS 1	·	1.4 km	MPC · JPL
820714	2014 WG_{571}	—	November 26, 2014	Haleakala	Pan-STARRS 1	·	1.1 km	MPC · JPL
820715	2014 WX_{572}	—	November 30, 2014	Haleakala	Pan-STARRS 1	·	1.2 km	MPC · JPL
820716	2014 WB_{576}	—	November 21, 2014	Haleakala	Pan-STARRS 1	·	1.6 km	MPC · JPL
820717	2014 WS_{579}	—	November 18, 2014	Mount Lemmon	Mount Lemmon Survey	·	950 m	MPC · JPL
820718	2014 WF_{584}	—	November 26, 2014	Haleakala	Pan-STARRS 1	·	950 m	MPC · JPL
820719	2014 WB_{593}	—	November 21, 2014	Haleakala	Pan-STARRS 1	MAR	560 m	MPC · JPL
820720	2014 WW_{595}	—	November 17, 2014	Haleakala	Pan-STARRS 1	EUN	780 m	MPC · JPL
820721	2014 WD_{596}	—	November 28, 2014	Haleakala	Pan-STARRS 1	·	1.0 km	MPC · JPL
820722	2014 WS_{603}	—	November 18, 2014	Mount Lemmon	Mount Lemmon Survey	·	860 m	MPC · JPL
820723	2014 WP_{605}	—	November 21, 2014	Mount Lemmon	Mount Lemmon Survey	MAR	710 m	MPC · JPL
820724	2014 WX_{606}	—	March 27, 2012	Kitt Peak	Spacewatch	BRA	1.2 km	MPC · JPL
820725	2014 WD_{613}	—	November 22, 2014	Haleakala	Pan-STARRS 1	·	570 m	MPC · JPL
820726	2014 XW	—	October 1, 2005	Kitt Peak	Spacewatch	·	1.3 km	MPC · JPL
820727	2014 XH_{2}	—	November 21, 2014	Haleakala	Pan-STARRS 1	H	380 m	MPC · JPL
820728	2014 XC_{6}	—	December 1, 2014	Mount Lemmon	Mount Lemmon Survey	BAR	1.5 km	MPC · JPL
820729	2014 XD_{6}	—	December 26, 1998	Kitt Peak	Spacewatch	T_{j} (2.96)	3.7 km	MPC · JPL
820730	2014 XE_{17}	—	November 29, 2014	Mount Lemmon	Mount Lemmon Survey	·	1.1 km	MPC · JPL
820731	2014 XU_{19}	—	November 1, 2014	Mount Lemmon	Mount Lemmon Survey	EUN	880 m	MPC · JPL
820732	2014 XK_{21}	—	November 19, 2003	Kitt Peak	Spacewatch	THM	1.6 km	MPC · JPL
820733	2014 XQ_{28}	—	June 12, 2013	Haleakala	Pan-STARRS 1	·	930 m	MPC · JPL
820734	2014 XT_{32}	—	November 27, 2014	Haleakala	Pan-STARRS 1	·	2.0 km	MPC · JPL
820735	2014 XL_{34}	—	December 27, 2011	Mount Lemmon	Mount Lemmon Survey	·	400 m	MPC · JPL
820736	2014 XU_{39}	—	December 15, 2014	Kitt Peak	Spacewatch	·	970 m	MPC · JPL
820737	2014 XE_{40}	—	May 11, 2008	Kitt Peak	Spacewatch	H	390 m	MPC · JPL
820738	2014 XA_{44}	—	December 12, 2014	Haleakala	Pan-STARRS 1	·	1 km	MPC · JPL
820739	2014 XM_{44}	—	November 20, 2014	Mount Lemmon	Mount Lemmon Survey	·	570 m	MPC · JPL
820740	2014 XU_{45}	—	February 10, 2016	Haleakala	Pan-STARRS 1	·	2.9 km	MPC · JPL
820741	2014 XZ_{45}	—	November 29, 2014	Mount Lemmon	Mount Lemmon Survey	·	2.4 km	MPC · JPL
820742	2014 XV_{49}	—	December 15, 2014	Mount Lemmon	Mount Lemmon Survey	·	2.3 km	MPC · JPL
820743	2014 XB_{51}	—	December 15, 2014	Mount Lemmon	Mount Lemmon Survey	·	1.4 km	MPC · JPL
820744	2014 XH_{51}	—	December 10, 2014	Mount Lemmon	Mount Lemmon Survey	·	900 m	MPC · JPL
820745	2014 XJ_{55}	—	December 11, 2014	Mount Lemmon	Mount Lemmon Survey	HNS	980 m	MPC · JPL
820746	2014 XQ_{55}	—	December 11, 2014	Mount Lemmon	Mount Lemmon Survey	·	1.2 km	MPC · JPL
820747	2014 YM_{6}	—	November 4, 2014	Mount Lemmon	Mount Lemmon Survey	PHO	870 m	MPC · JPL
820748	2014 YL_{16}	—	January 27, 2012	Kitt Peak	Spacewatch	·	500 m	MPC · JPL
820749	2014 YH_{17}	—	December 20, 2014	Haleakala	Pan-STARRS 1	·	390 m	MPC · JPL
820750	2014 YM_{33}	—	December 27, 2014	Mount Lemmon	Mount Lemmon Survey	·	2.9 km	MPC · JPL
820751	2014 YG_{34}	—	April 25, 2007	Mount Lemmon	Mount Lemmon Survey	JUN	790 m	MPC · JPL
820752	2014 YH_{37}	—	February 27, 2008	Kitt Peak	Spacewatch	·	960 m	MPC · JPL
820753	2014 YP_{38}	—	December 26, 2014	Haleakala	Pan-STARRS 1	·	2.3 km	MPC · JPL
820754	2014 YY_{42}	—	December 26, 2014	Haleakala	Pan-STARRS 1	H	450 m	MPC · JPL
820755	2014 YN_{47}	—	October 5, 2014	Haleakala	Pan-STARRS 1	PHO	760 m	MPC · JPL
820756	2014 YO_{48}	—	December 16, 2014	Haleakala	Pan-STARRS 1	·	1.9 km	MPC · JPL
820757	2014 YT_{52}	—	December 21, 2014	Haleakala	Pan-STARRS 1	·	1.9 km	MPC · JPL
820758	2014 YK_{61}	—	December 1, 2014	Mount Lemmon	Mount Lemmon Survey	HNS	830 m	MPC · JPL
820759	2014 YC_{64}	—	December 29, 2014	Haleakala	Pan-STARRS 1	PHO	870 m	MPC · JPL
820760	2014 YF_{65}	—	December 26, 2014	Haleakala	Pan-STARRS 1	·	500 m	MPC · JPL
820761	2014 YO_{66}	—	December 21, 2014	Haleakala	Pan-STARRS 1	·	1.6 km	MPC · JPL
820762	2014 YT_{66}	—	December 20, 2014	Haleakala	Pan-STARRS 1	H	320 m	MPC · JPL
820763	2014 YP_{67}	—	January 14, 2016	Haleakala	Pan-STARRS 1	·	2.5 km	MPC · JPL
820764	2014 YE_{68}	—	December 29, 2014	Haleakala	Pan-STARRS 1	·	2.7 km	MPC · JPL
820765	2014 YZ_{68}	—	November 18, 2014	Mount Lemmon	Mount Lemmon Survey	·	1.1 km	MPC · JPL
820766	2014 YK_{74}	—	December 25, 2014	Haleakala	Pan-STARRS 1	THB	2.3 km	MPC · JPL
820767	2014 YH_{77}	—	December 21, 2014	Haleakala	Pan-STARRS 1	H	300 m	MPC · JPL
820768	2014 YT_{77}	—	December 29, 2014	Mount Lemmon	Mount Lemmon Survey	·	2.6 km	MPC · JPL
820769	2014 YJ_{80}	—	December 29, 2014	Haleakala	Pan-STARRS 1	·	480 m	MPC · JPL
820770	2014 YF_{82}	—	December 29, 2014	Haleakala	Pan-STARRS 1	H	410 m	MPC · JPL
820771	2014 YK_{83}	—	December 29, 2014	Haleakala	Pan-STARRS 1	·	1.2 km	MPC · JPL
820772	2014 YP_{89}	—	December 26, 2014	Haleakala	Pan-STARRS 1	H	380 m	MPC · JPL
820773	2014 YG_{90}	—	December 29, 2014	Haleakala	Pan-STARRS 1	·	950 m	MPC · JPL
820774	2014 YP_{95}	—	December 26, 2014	Haleakala	Pan-STARRS 1	·	1.2 km	MPC · JPL
820775	2014 YJ_{96}	—	December 16, 2014	Haleakala	Pan-STARRS 1	HNS	790 m	MPC · JPL
820776	2014 YQ_{97}	—	December 21, 2014	Haleakala	Pan-STARRS 1	HOF	1.9 km	MPC · JPL
820777	2014 YW_{97}	—	December 29, 2014	Haleakala	Pan-STARRS 1	·	1.3 km	MPC · JPL
820778	2015 AZ_{1}	—	November 23, 2014	Haleakala	Pan-STARRS 1	MAR	660 m	MPC · JPL
820779	2015 AB_{2}	—	October 27, 2014	Haleakala	Pan-STARRS 1	·	3.2 km	MPC · JPL
820780	2015 AP_{14}	—	January 11, 2015	Haleakala	Pan-STARRS 1	·	1.8 km	MPC · JPL
820781	2015 AE_{15}	—	January 11, 2015	Haleakala	Pan-STARRS 1	·	1.7 km	MPC · JPL
820782	2015 AY_{17}	—	December 11, 2014	Haleakala	Pan-STARRS 1	H	370 m	MPC · JPL
820783	2015 AL_{24}	—	November 26, 2014	Haleakala	Pan-STARRS 1	·	2.1 km	MPC · JPL
820784	2015 AP_{30}	—	August 12, 2013	Haleakala	Pan-STARRS 1	·	670 m	MPC · JPL
820785	2015 AO_{36}	—	December 21, 2014	Haleakala	Pan-STARRS 1	·	1.3 km	MPC · JPL
820786	2015 AP_{48}	—	January 12, 2015	Haleakala	Pan-STARRS 1	L5	6.8 km	MPC · JPL
820787	2015 AT_{54}	—	October 23, 2009	Mount Lemmon	Mount Lemmon Survey	·	1.1 km	MPC · JPL
820788	2015 AJ_{58}	—	December 29, 2014	Mount Lemmon	Mount Lemmon Survey	·	1.3 km	MPC · JPL
820789	2015 AT_{60}	—	December 30, 2007	Mount Lemmon	Mount Lemmon Survey	·	650 m	MPC · JPL
820790	2015 AL_{66}	—	February 25, 2011	Mount Lemmon	Mount Lemmon Survey	·	1.0 km	MPC · JPL
820791	2015 AY_{71}	—	January 13, 2015	Haleakala	Pan-STARRS 1	·	1.3 km	MPC · JPL
820792	2015 AJ_{74}	—	January 13, 2015	Haleakala	Pan-STARRS 1	·	1.2 km	MPC · JPL
820793	2015 AX_{74}	—	December 21, 2014	Haleakala	Pan-STARRS 1	·	410 m	MPC · JPL
820794	2015 AW_{77}	—	November 18, 2014	Mount Lemmon	Mount Lemmon Survey	·	2.6 km	MPC · JPL
820795	2015 AA_{78}	—	January 13, 2015	Haleakala	Pan-STARRS 1	·	620 m	MPC · JPL
820796	2015 AS_{81}	—	December 21, 2014	Mount Lemmon	Mount Lemmon Survey	·	1.4 km	MPC · JPL
820797	2015 AL_{83}	—	January 13, 2015	Haleakala	Pan-STARRS 1	·	1.7 km	MPC · JPL
820798	2015 AB_{88}	—	January 13, 2015	Haleakala	Pan-STARRS 1	EOS	1.5 km	MPC · JPL
820799	2015 AB_{91}	—	January 19, 2012	Haleakala	Pan-STARRS 1	·	470 m	MPC · JPL
820800	2015 AU_{92}	—	December 21, 2014	Mount Lemmon	Mount Lemmon Survey	·	2.1 km	MPC · JPL

== 820801–820900 ==
back to top

Designation			Discovery			Properties		Ref
Permanent	Provisional	Named after	Date	Site	Discoverer(s)	Category	Diam.	Ref
820801	2015 AS_{102}	—	January 14, 2015	Haleakala	Pan-STARRS 1	·	1.4 km	MPC · JPL
820802	2015 AO_{103}	—	December 21, 2014	Haleakala	Pan-STARRS 1	·	1.7 km	MPC · JPL
820803	2015 AT_{105}	—	September 9, 2013	Haleakala	Pan-STARRS 1	·	630 m	MPC · JPL
820804	2015 AL_{110}	—	January 14, 2015	Haleakala	Pan-STARRS 1	·	1.2 km	MPC · JPL
820805	2015 AO_{110}	—	October 2, 2013	Haleakala	Pan-STARRS 1	·	970 m	MPC · JPL
820806	2015 AK_{111}	—	January 14, 2015	Haleakala	Pan-STARRS 1	EOS	1.4 km	MPC · JPL
820807	2015 AN_{111}	—	January 14, 2015	Haleakala	Pan-STARRS 1	·	2.6 km	MPC · JPL
820808	2015 AN_{112}	—	January 14, 2015	Haleakala	Pan-STARRS 1	·	2.1 km	MPC · JPL
820809	2015 AG_{114}	—	December 21, 2014	Mount Lemmon	Mount Lemmon Survey	·	520 m	MPC · JPL
820810	2015 AL_{116}	—	September 3, 2013	Haleakala	Pan-STARRS 1	·	1.2 km	MPC · JPL
820811	2015 AU_{116}	—	August 7, 2013	Kitt Peak	Spacewatch	(5)	790 m	MPC · JPL
820812	2015 AX_{119}	—	January 14, 2015	Haleakala	Pan-STARRS 1	·	830 m	MPC · JPL
820813	2015 AD_{121}	—	December 9, 2009	La Sagra	OAM	·	1.6 km	MPC · JPL
820814	2015 AQ_{126}	—	April 6, 2002	Cerro Tololo	Deep Ecliptic Survey	·	1.3 km	MPC · JPL
820815	2015 AL_{127}	—	September 1, 2013	Catalina	CSS	·	920 m	MPC · JPL
820816	2015 AE_{129}	—	January 14, 2015	Haleakala	Pan-STARRS 1	NYS	790 m	MPC · JPL
820817	2015 AH_{135}	—	February 23, 2012	Mount Lemmon	Mount Lemmon Survey	·	470 m	MPC · JPL
820818	2015 AF_{138}	—	November 7, 2008	Mount Lemmon	Mount Lemmon Survey	·	1.3 km	MPC · JPL
820819	2015 AM_{138}	—	December 21, 2014	Haleakala	Pan-STARRS 1	·	850 m	MPC · JPL
820820	2015 AN_{143}	—	January 14, 2015	Haleakala	Pan-STARRS 1	·	1.3 km	MPC · JPL
820821	2015 AR_{147}	—	March 18, 2007	Kitt Peak	Spacewatch	·	1.1 km	MPC · JPL
820822	2015 AY_{148}	—	September 6, 2013	Kitt Peak	Spacewatch	·	1.6 km	MPC · JPL
820823	2015 AL_{149}	—	December 21, 2014	Haleakala	Pan-STARRS 1	·	1 km	MPC · JPL
820824	2015 AX_{149}	—	January 30, 2011	Mount Lemmon	Mount Lemmon Survey	·	1.1 km	MPC · JPL
820825	2015 AM_{152}	—	January 14, 2015	Haleakala	Pan-STARRS 1	·	1.2 km	MPC · JPL
820826	2015 AX_{157}	—	January 14, 2015	Haleakala	Pan-STARRS 1	·	2.4 km	MPC · JPL
820827	2015 AG_{158}	—	May 15, 2012	Kitt Peak	Spacewatch	·	1.3 km	MPC · JPL
820828	2015 AW_{158}	—	January 18, 2008	Kitt Peak	Spacewatch	·	470 m	MPC · JPL
820829	2015 AM_{159}	—	January 14, 2015	Haleakala	Pan-STARRS 1	·	1.1 km	MPC · JPL
820830	2015 AU_{160}	—	September 1, 2013	Haleakala	Pan-STARRS 1	·	460 m	MPC · JPL
820831	2015 AV_{164}	—	September 13, 2013	Kitt Peak	Spacewatch	V	480 m	MPC · JPL
820832	2015 AY_{164}	—	January 14, 2015	Haleakala	Pan-STARRS 1	HNS	860 m	MPC · JPL
820833	2015 AD_{166}	—	November 11, 2013	Mount Lemmon	Mount Lemmon Survey	·	2.1 km	MPC · JPL
820834	2015 AW_{169}	—	November 9, 2013	Mount Lemmon	Mount Lemmon Survey	HYG	2.0 km	MPC · JPL
820835	2015 AL_{170}	—	January 14, 2015	Haleakala	Pan-STARRS 1	·	1.4 km	MPC · JPL
820836	2015 AL_{182}	—	January 14, 2015	Haleakala	Pan-STARRS 1	PHO	760 m	MPC · JPL
820837	2015 AO_{185}	—	December 21, 2014	Haleakala	Pan-STARRS 1	·	950 m	MPC · JPL
820838	2015 AE_{187}	—	March 21, 2012	Mount Lemmon	Mount Lemmon Survey	·	510 m	MPC · JPL
820839	2015 AQ_{190}	—	January 14, 2015	Haleakala	Pan-STARRS 1	·	1.3 km	MPC · JPL
820840	2015 AY_{190}	—	December 21, 2014	Haleakala	Pan-STARRS 1	·	1.5 km	MPC · JPL
820841	2015 AO_{192}	—	September 1, 2013	Mount Lemmon	Mount Lemmon Survey	MAS	590 m	MPC · JPL
820842	2015 AX_{197}	—	March 15, 2012	Mount Lemmon	Mount Lemmon Survey	·	450 m	MPC · JPL
820843	2015 AP_{204}	—	December 21, 2014	Haleakala	Pan-STARRS 1	·	2.4 km	MPC · JPL
820844	2015 AU_{208}	—	November 21, 2014	Haleakala	Pan-STARRS 1	MAR	730 m	MPC · JPL
820845	2015 AO_{209}	—	September 16, 2010	Kitt Peak	Spacewatch	V	490 m	MPC · JPL
820846	2015 AY_{216}	—	January 15, 2015	Haleakala	Pan-STARRS 1	EUN	820 m	MPC · JPL
820847	2015 AE_{217}	—	January 15, 2015	Haleakala	Pan-STARRS 1	MAR	630 m	MPC · JPL
820848	2015 AG_{220}	—	December 16, 2014	Haleakala	Pan-STARRS 1	EUN	800 m	MPC · JPL
820849	2015 AU_{226}	—	January 15, 2015	Haleakala	Pan-STARRS 1	·	510 m	MPC · JPL
820850	2015 AF_{228}	—	November 9, 2009	Kitt Peak	Spacewatch	·	1.1 km	MPC · JPL
820851	2015 AX_{229}	—	October 13, 2013	Kitt Peak	Spacewatch	WIT	700 m	MPC · JPL
820852	2015 AW_{234}	—	November 30, 2014	Haleakala	Pan-STARRS 1	T_{j} (2.99) · EUP	2.4 km	MPC · JPL
820853	2015 AN_{235}	—	October 5, 2013	Haleakala	Pan-STARRS 1	GEF	920 m	MPC · JPL
820854	2015 AU_{237}	—	January 15, 2015	Haleakala	Pan-STARRS 1	MAR	770 m	MPC · JPL
820855	2015 AA_{238}	—	October 20, 2003	Kitt Peak	Spacewatch	·	560 m	MPC · JPL
820856	2015 AT_{238}	—	January 15, 2015	Haleakala	Pan-STARRS 1	·	2.0 km	MPC · JPL
820857	2015 AH_{241}	—	July 15, 2005	Mount Lemmon	Mount Lemmon Survey	·	1.1 km	MPC · JPL
820858	2015 AQ_{243}	—	January 15, 2015	Haleakala	Pan-STARRS 1	H	340 m	MPC · JPL
820859	2015 AE_{244}	—	April 25, 2007	Mount Lemmon	Mount Lemmon Survey	·	1.2 km	MPC · JPL
820860	2015 AU_{252}	—	October 28, 2013	Haleakala	Pan-STARRS 1	·	2.4 km	MPC · JPL
820861	2015 AB_{261}	—	January 15, 2015	Haleakala	Pan-STARRS 1	·	1.4 km	MPC · JPL
820862	2015 AZ_{261}	—	October 31, 2010	Mount Lemmon	Mount Lemmon Survey	·	470 m	MPC · JPL
820863	2015 AP_{270}	—	October 7, 2005	Mount Lemmon	Mount Lemmon Survey	·	840 m	MPC · JPL
820864	2015 AD_{271}	—	January 13, 2015	Haleakala	Pan-STARRS 1	EUN	860 m	MPC · JPL
820865	2015 AY_{272}	—	January 13, 2015	Haleakala	Pan-STARRS 1	·	1.9 km	MPC · JPL
820866	2015 AS_{276}	—	January 15, 2015	Haleakala	Pan-STARRS 1	·	730 m	MPC · JPL
820867	2015 AF_{280}	—	January 15, 2015	Haleakala	Pan-STARRS 1	H	360 m	MPC · JPL
820868	2015 AG_{281}	—	October 2, 2008	Catalina	CSS	H	510 m	MPC · JPL
820869	2015 AZ_{287}	—	January 11, 2015	Haleakala	Pan-STARRS 1	·	1.6 km	MPC · JPL
820870	2015 AT_{294}	—	January 8, 2015	Haleakala	Pan-STARRS 1	T_{j} (2.99)	3.4 km	MPC · JPL
820871	2015 AW_{294}	—	January 15, 2015	Haleakala	Pan-STARRS 1	·	820 m	MPC · JPL
820872	2015 AT_{295}	—	January 14, 2015	Haleakala	Pan-STARRS 1	·	2.7 km	MPC · JPL
820873	2015 AZ_{296}	—	October 28, 2017	Haleakala	Pan-STARRS 1	·	450 m	MPC · JPL
820874	2015 AR_{297}	—	January 14, 2015	Haleakala	Pan-STARRS 1	·	2.5 km	MPC · JPL
820875	2015 AV_{297}	—	June 18, 2018	Haleakala	Pan-STARRS 1	·	2.5 km	MPC · JPL
820876	2015 AC_{299}	—	January 13, 2015	Haleakala	Pan-STARRS 1	·	880 m	MPC · JPL
820877	2015 AE_{299}	—	January 14, 2015	Haleakala	Pan-STARRS 1	H	360 m	MPC · JPL
820878	2015 AF_{299}	—	January 15, 2015	Mount Lemmon	Mount Lemmon Survey	·	1.5 km	MPC · JPL
820879	2015 AJ_{301}	—	January 15, 2015	Haleakala	Pan-STARRS 1	PHO	700 m	MPC · JPL
820880	2015 AV_{304}	—	January 15, 2015	Haleakala	Pan-STARRS 1	·	900 m	MPC · JPL
820881	2015 AN_{306}	—	October 9, 2005	Kitt Peak	Spacewatch	HNS	680 m	MPC · JPL
820882	2015 BO	—	January 17, 2005	Kitt Peak	Spacewatch	PHO	810 m	MPC · JPL
820883	2015 BJ_{6}	—	January 13, 2002	Kitt Peak	Spacewatch	·	540 m	MPC · JPL
820884	2015 BY_{18}	—	December 26, 2014	Haleakala	Pan-STARRS 1	·	1.1 km	MPC · JPL
820885	2015 BP_{19}	—	January 16, 2015	Haleakala	Pan-STARRS 1	·	1.0 km	MPC · JPL
820886	2015 BS_{22}	—	January 16, 2015	Haleakala	Pan-STARRS 1	·	1.3 km	MPC · JPL
820887	2015 BO_{25}	—	December 5, 2007	Kitt Peak	Spacewatch	·	570 m	MPC · JPL
820888	2015 BP_{25}	—	January 16, 2015	Haleakala	Pan-STARRS 1	·	580 m	MPC · JPL
820889	2015 BM_{26}	—	January 16, 2015	Haleakala	Pan-STARRS 1	·	710 m	MPC · JPL
820890	2015 BA_{31}	—	October 8, 2008	Mount Lemmon	Mount Lemmon Survey	·	1.4 km	MPC · JPL
820891	2015 BG_{34}	—	January 16, 2015	Haleakala	Pan-STARRS 1	·	2.5 km	MPC · JPL
820892	2015 BG_{38}	—	January 26, 2011	Kitt Peak	Spacewatch	·	1.2 km	MPC · JPL
820893	2015 BX_{40}	—	January 17, 2015	Kitt Peak	Spacewatch	·	670 m	MPC · JPL
820894	2015 BQ_{42}	—	November 26, 2014	Haleakala	Pan-STARRS 1	·	1 km	MPC · JPL
820895	2015 BQ_{44}	—	January 17, 2015	Haleakala	Pan-STARRS 1	·	1.0 km	MPC · JPL
820896	2015 BE_{45}	—	November 17, 2014	Haleakala	Pan-STARRS 1	H	400 m	MPC · JPL
820897	2015 BJ_{55}	—	January 17, 2015	Mount Lemmon	Mount Lemmon Survey	·	1.3 km	MPC · JPL
820898	2015 BB_{56}	—	January 17, 2015	Mount Lemmon	Mount Lemmon Survey	·	2.2 km	MPC · JPL
820899	2015 BM_{59}	—	January 16, 2015	Mount Lemmon	Mount Lemmon Survey	NYS	870 m	MPC · JPL
820900	2015 BP_{61}	—	January 17, 2015	Haleakala	Pan-STARRS 1	·	1.7 km	MPC · JPL

== 820901–821000 ==
back to top

Designation			Discovery			Properties		Ref
Permanent	Provisional	Named after	Date	Site	Discoverer(s)	Category	Diam.	Ref
820901	2015 BJ_{63}	—	January 17, 2015	Haleakala	Pan-STARRS 1	·	1.0 km	MPC · JPL
820902	2015 BT_{67}	—	January 17, 2015	Haleakala	Pan-STARRS 1	·	2.2 km	MPC · JPL
820903	2015 BH_{75}	—	January 14, 2011	Mount Lemmon	Mount Lemmon Survey	·	860 m	MPC · JPL
820904	2015 BF_{76}	—	September 23, 2009	La Silla	A. Galád	·	640 m	MPC · JPL
820905	2015 BE_{79}	—	January 18, 2015	Mount Lemmon	Mount Lemmon Survey	·	500 m	MPC · JPL
820906	2015 BQ_{82}	—	June 20, 2013	Haleakala	Pan-STARRS 1	PHO	790 m	MPC · JPL
820907	2015 BY_{93}	—	February 7, 2008	Kitt Peak	Spacewatch	NYS	690 m	MPC · JPL
820908	2015 BR_{100}	—	November 17, 2006	Mount Lemmon	Mount Lemmon Survey	NYS	870 m	MPC · JPL
820909	2015 BK_{101}	—	July 14, 2013	Haleakala	Pan-STARRS 1	·	1.4 km	MPC · JPL
820910	2015 BU_{101}	—	January 16, 2015	Kitt Peak	Spacewatch	·	2.0 km	MPC · JPL
820911	2015 BG_{103}	—	March 21, 2001	Kitt Peak	Spacewatch	·	510 m	MPC · JPL
820912	2015 BB_{106}	—	January 16, 2015	Haleakala	Pan-STARRS 1	·	1.4 km	MPC · JPL
820913	2015 BV_{107}	—	October 28, 2014	Haleakala	Pan-STARRS 1	·	1.2 km	MPC · JPL
820914	2015 BH_{108}	—	November 26, 2014	Haleakala	Pan-STARRS 1	·	600 m	MPC · JPL
820915	2015 BZ_{111}	—	February 8, 2011	Mount Lemmon	Mount Lemmon Survey	·	1.2 km	MPC · JPL
820916	2015 BG_{114}	—	January 17, 2015	Mount Lemmon	Mount Lemmon Survey	·	1.2 km	MPC · JPL
820917	2015 BA_{115}	—	May 1, 2005	Palomar	NEAT	·	750 m	MPC · JPL
820918	2015 BR_{115}	—	February 25, 2009	Calar Alto	F. Hormuth	·	2.7 km	MPC · JPL
820919	2015 BE_{120}	—	January 17, 2015	Haleakala	Pan-STARRS 1	·	500 m	MPC · JPL
820920	2015 BA_{123}	—	January 17, 2015	Haleakala	Pan-STARRS 1	·	1.4 km	MPC · JPL
820921	2015 BZ_{126}	—	January 30, 2011	Mount Lemmon	Mount Lemmon Survey	EUN	730 m	MPC · JPL
820922	2015 BQ_{131}	—	August 18, 2006	Kitt Peak	Spacewatch	·	610 m	MPC · JPL
820923	2015 BH_{135}	—	March 12, 2008	Kitt Peak	Spacewatch	NYS	740 m	MPC · JPL
820924	2015 BR_{135}	—	January 17, 2015	Haleakala	Pan-STARRS 1	·	970 m	MPC · JPL
820925	2015 BH_{136}	—	January 17, 2015	Haleakala	Pan-STARRS 1	·	980 m	MPC · JPL
820926	2015 BR_{142}	—	January 17, 2015	Haleakala	Pan-STARRS 1	·	1.5 km	MPC · JPL
820927	2015 BX_{144}	—	March 13, 2010	Kitt Peak	Spacewatch	·	2.1 km	MPC · JPL
820928	2015 BA_{145}	—	January 17, 2015	Haleakala	Pan-STARRS 1	·	530 m	MPC · JPL
820929	2015 BD_{145}	—	January 17, 2015	Haleakala	Pan-STARRS 1	·	890 m	MPC · JPL
820930	2015 BB_{150}	—	December 14, 2010	Mount Lemmon	Mount Lemmon Survey	V	510 m	MPC · JPL
820931	2015 BM_{151}	—	March 16, 2012	Kitt Peak	Spacewatch	·	500 m	MPC · JPL
820932	2015 BV_{151}	—	September 14, 2013	Haleakala	Pan-STARRS 1	·	1.2 km	MPC · JPL
820933	2015 BN_{153}	—	October 1, 2013	Kitt Peak	Spacewatch	·	1.8 km	MPC · JPL
820934	2015 BG_{154}	—	January 17, 2015	Haleakala	Pan-STARRS 1	AGN	740 m	MPC · JPL
820935	2015 BY_{154}	—	January 17, 2015	Haleakala	Pan-STARRS 1	·	1.2 km	MPC · JPL
820936	2015 BS_{162}	—	January 17, 2015	Haleakala	Pan-STARRS 1	·	1.4 km	MPC · JPL
820937	2015 BZ_{162}	—	August 27, 2009	Kitt Peak	Spacewatch	·	720 m	MPC · JPL
820938	2015 BG_{165}	—	March 26, 2001	Kitt Peak	Deep Ecliptic Survey	MAS	530 m	MPC · JPL
820939	2015 BK_{166}	—	January 17, 2015	Haleakala	Pan-STARRS 1	·	510 m	MPC · JPL
820940	2015 BX_{170}	—	January 17, 2015	Haleakala	Pan-STARRS 1	·	1.3 km	MPC · JPL
820941	2015 BF_{172}	—	January 17, 2015	Haleakala	Pan-STARRS 1	·	1.5 km	MPC · JPL
820942	2015 BP_{176}	—	January 17, 2015	Haleakala	Pan-STARRS 1	VER	2.5 km	MPC · JPL
820943	2015 BY_{176}	—	January 17, 2015	Haleakala	Pan-STARRS 1	NEM	1.7 km	MPC · JPL
820944	2015 BT_{180}	—	April 1, 2011	Mount Lemmon	Mount Lemmon Survey	·	1.1 km	MPC · JPL
820945	2015 BL_{188}	—	January 17, 2015	Haleakala	Pan-STARRS 1	·	910 m	MPC · JPL
820946	2015 BJ_{190}	—	January 17, 2015	Haleakala	Pan-STARRS 1	·	460 m	MPC · JPL
820947	2015 BF_{192}	—	January 17, 2015	Haleakala	Pan-STARRS 1	MRX	750 m	MPC · JPL
820948	2015 BD_{194}	—	January 17, 2015	Haleakala	Pan-STARRS 1	·	490 m	MPC · JPL
820949	2015 BA_{195}	—	March 18, 2009	Mount Lemmon	Mount Lemmon Survey	·	560 m	MPC · JPL
820950	2015 BZ_{201}	—	August 4, 2013	Haleakala	Pan-STARRS 1	·	500 m	MPC · JPL
820951	2015 BK_{210}	—	January 19, 2012	Haleakala	Pan-STARRS 1	·	470 m	MPC · JPL
820952	2015 BX_{212}	—	January 18, 2015	Mount Lemmon	Mount Lemmon Survey	·	1.4 km	MPC · JPL
820953	2015 BF_{217}	—	January 29, 2011	Mount Lemmon	Mount Lemmon Survey	·	840 m	MPC · JPL
820954	2015 BN_{223}	—	December 26, 2014	Haleakala	Pan-STARRS 1	·	2.2 km	MPC · JPL
820955	2015 BL_{224}	—	February 27, 2009	Kitt Peak	Spacewatch	·	510 m	MPC · JPL
820956	2015 BZ_{228}	—	January 11, 2011	Kitt Peak	Spacewatch	·	860 m	MPC · JPL
820957	2015 BR_{230}	—	January 18, 2015	Haleakala	Pan-STARRS 1	·	1.2 km	MPC · JPL
820958	2015 BZ_{230}	—	November 18, 2008	Kitt Peak	Spacewatch	EOS	1.3 km	MPC · JPL
820959	2015 BX_{233}	—	November 7, 2007	Mount Lemmon	Mount Lemmon Survey	·	440 m	MPC · JPL
820960	2015 BD_{235}	—	March 29, 2009	Kitt Peak	Spacewatch	·	470 m	MPC · JPL
820961	2015 BZ_{235}	—	August 9, 2013	Catalina	CSS	·	2.6 km	MPC · JPL
820962	2015 BU_{236}	—	December 29, 2014	Haleakala	Pan-STARRS 1	KON	1.7 km	MPC · JPL
820963	2015 BA_{240}	—	April 5, 2011	Kitt Peak	Spacewatch	·	1.3 km	MPC · JPL
820964	2015 BH_{243}	—	December 18, 2014	Haleakala	Pan-STARRS 1	·	1.7 km	MPC · JPL
820965	2015 BD_{244}	—	September 15, 2010	Mount Lemmon	Mount Lemmon Survey	·	500 m	MPC · JPL
820966	2015 BH_{251}	—	August 15, 2013	Haleakala	Pan-STARRS 1	·	1.0 km	MPC · JPL
820967	2015 BB_{254}	—	October 31, 2007	Mount Lemmon	Mount Lemmon Survey	·	450 m	MPC · JPL
820968	2015 BF_{254}	—	January 18, 2015	Haleakala	Pan-STARRS 1	·	1.3 km	MPC · JPL
820969	2015 BY_{255}	—	January 18, 2015	Haleakala	Pan-STARRS 1	PAD	1.0 km	MPC · JPL
820970	2015 BA_{261}	—	December 21, 2014	Mount Lemmon	Mount Lemmon Survey	·	1.4 km	MPC · JPL
820971	2015 BP_{262}	—	November 27, 2014	Haleakala	Pan-STARRS 1	EUN	1.0 km	MPC · JPL
820972	2015 BY_{263}	—	January 18, 2015	Haleakala	Pan-STARRS 1	MAR	980 m	MPC · JPL
820973	2015 BY_{265}	—	September 22, 2014	Haleakala	Pan-STARRS 1	·	3.1 km	MPC · JPL
820974	2015 BT_{266}	—	November 30, 2014	Haleakala	Pan-STARRS 1	HNS	900 m	MPC · JPL
820975	2015 BF_{272}	—	November 21, 2014	Mount Lemmon	Mount Lemmon Survey	·	2.3 km	MPC · JPL
820976	2015 BC_{275}	—	December 20, 2014	Haleakala	Pan-STARRS 1	H	320 m	MPC · JPL
820977	2015 BM_{275}	—	December 13, 2014	Haleakala	Pan-STARRS 1	·	890 m	MPC · JPL
820978	2015 BG_{276}	—	January 19, 2015	Mount Lemmon	Mount Lemmon Survey	·	2.9 km	MPC · JPL
820979	2015 BF_{278}	—	January 19, 2015	Kitt Peak	Spacewatch	·	830 m	MPC · JPL
820980	2015 BO_{279}	—	January 19, 2015	Haleakala	Pan-STARRS 1	·	1.4 km	MPC · JPL
820981	2015 BH_{283}	—	October 3, 2013	Mount Lemmon	Mount Lemmon Survey	·	1.5 km	MPC · JPL
820982	2015 BB_{287}	—	October 2, 2013	Mount Lemmon	Mount Lemmon Survey	·	1.4 km	MPC · JPL
820983	2015 BE_{288}	—	April 29, 2011	Mount Lemmon	Mount Lemmon Survey	·	1.6 km	MPC · JPL
820984	2015 BF_{288}	—	October 24, 2013	Mount Lemmon	Mount Lemmon Survey	·	2.1 km	MPC · JPL
820985	2015 BJ_{289}	—	January 19, 2015	Haleakala	Pan-STARRS 1	(18466)	1.6 km	MPC · JPL
820986	2015 BC_{290}	—	October 19, 2001	Kitt Peak	Spacewatch	·	820 m	MPC · JPL
820987	2015 BK_{290}	—	November 9, 2009	Kitt Peak	Spacewatch	·	1.7 km	MPC · JPL
820988	2015 BY_{292}	—	March 13, 2007	Mount Lemmon	Mount Lemmon Survey	·	840 m	MPC · JPL
820989	2015 BT_{298}	—	January 19, 2015	Haleakala	Pan-STARRS 1	H	340 m	MPC · JPL
820990	2015 BX_{298}	—	January 19, 2015	Haleakala	Pan-STARRS 1	·	710 m	MPC · JPL
820991	2015 BM_{300}	—	March 2, 2008	Mount Lemmon	Mount Lemmon Survey	·	610 m	MPC · JPL
820992	2015 BL_{314}	—	January 16, 2015	Haleakala	Pan-STARRS 1	NYS	800 m	MPC · JPL
820993	2015 BM_{314}	—	January 16, 2015	Haleakala	Pan-STARRS 1	AGN	820 m	MPC · JPL
820994	2015 BE_{318}	—	January 17, 2015	Haleakala	Pan-STARRS 1	·	1.3 km	MPC · JPL
820995	2015 BS_{319}	—	January 17, 2015	Haleakala	Pan-STARRS 1	·	1.2 km	MPC · JPL
820996	2015 BY_{319}	—	February 24, 2008	Mount Lemmon	Mount Lemmon Survey	·	580 m	MPC · JPL
820997	2015 BL_{320}	—	January 17, 2015	Haleakala	Pan-STARRS 1	·	2.3 km	MPC · JPL
820998	2015 BY_{323}	—	January 17, 2015	Haleakala	Pan-STARRS 1	·	500 m	MPC · JPL
820999	2015 BH_{328}	—	September 14, 2006	Catalina	CSS	NYS	780 m	MPC · JPL
821000	2015 BZ_{328}	—	May 13, 2009	Mount Lemmon	Mount Lemmon Survey	·	560 m	MPC · JPL

back to top
