= List of minor planets: 7001–8000 =

The following is a partial list of minor planets, running from minor-planet number 7001 through 8000, inclusive. The primary data for this and other partial lists is based on JPL's "Small-Body Orbital Elements" and data available from the Minor Planet Center. Critical list information is also provided by the MPC, unless otherwise specified from Lowell Observatory. A detailed description of the table's columns and additional sources are given on the main page including a complete list of every page in this series, and a statistical break-up on the dynamical classification of minor planets.

Also see the summary list of all named bodies in numerical and alphabetical order, and the corresponding naming citations for the number range of this particular list. New namings may only be added to this list after official publication, as the preannouncement of names is condemned by the Working Group for Small Bodies Nomenclature of the International Astronomical Union.

Near-Earth obj.	MBA (inner)	MBA (outer)	Centaur
Mars-crosser	MBA (middle)	Jupiter trojan	Trans-Neptunian obj.
Unclassified

== 7001–7100 ==
Designation			Discovery			Properties		Ref
Permanent	Provisional	Named after	Date	Site	Discoverer(s)	Category	Diam.	Ref
7001 Noether	1955 EH	Noether	March 14, 1955	Brooklyn	Indiana University	·	6.1 km (3.8 mi)	MPC · JPL
7002 Bronshten	1971 OV	Bronshten	July 26, 1971	Nauchnij	N. S. Chernykh	moon	4.3 km (2.7 mi)	MPC · JPL
7003 Zoyamironova	1976 SZ_{9}	Zoyamironova	September 25, 1976	Nauchnij	N. S. Chernykh	·	17 km (11 mi)	MPC · JPL
7004 Markthiemens	1979 OB_{9}	Markthiemens	July 24, 1979	Siding Spring	S. J. Bus	·	4.4 km (2.7 mi)	MPC · JPL
7005 Henninghaack	1981 ET_{25}	Henninghaack	March 2, 1981	Siding Spring	S. J. Bus	V	3.2 km (2.0 mi)	MPC · JPL
7006 Folco	1981 ER_{31}	Folco	March 2, 1981	Siding Spring	S. J. Bus	·	3.0 km (1.9 mi)	MPC · JPL
7007 Timjull	1981 EK_{34}	Timjull	March 2, 1981	Siding Spring	S. J. Bus	MAS	2.6 km (1.6 mi)	MPC · JPL
7008 Pavlov	1985 QH_{5}	Pavlov	August 23, 1985	Nauchnij	N. S. Chernykh	·	7.3 km (4.5 mi)	MPC · JPL
7009 Hume	1987 QU_{1}	Hume	August 21, 1987	La Silla	E. W. Elst	·	2.9 km (1.8 mi)	MPC · JPL
7010 Locke	1987 QH_{3}	Locke	August 28, 1987	La Silla	E. W. Elst	·	4.2 km (2.6 mi)	MPC · JPL
7011 Worley	1987 SK_{1}	Worley	September 21, 1987	Anderson Mesa	E. Bowell	(2076)	5.2 km (3.2 mi)	MPC · JPL
7012 Hobbes	1988 CH_{2}	Hobbes	February 11, 1988	La Silla	E. W. Elst	V	4.7 km (2.9 mi)	MPC · JPL
7013 Trachet	1988 RS_{4}	Trachet	September 1, 1988	La Silla	H. Debehogne	·	5.4 km (3.4 mi)	MPC · JPL
7014 Nietzsche	1989 GT_{4}	Nietzsche	April 3, 1989	La Silla	E. W. Elst	·	5.0 km (3.1 mi)	MPC · JPL
7015 Schopenhauer	1990 QC_{8}	Schopenhauer	August 16, 1990	La Silla	E. W. Elst	·	4.8 km (3.0 mi)	MPC · JPL
7016 Conandoyle	1991 YG	Conandoyle	December 30, 1991	Oohira	T. Urata	·	4.1 km (2.5 mi)	MPC · JPL
7017 Uradowan	1992 CE_{2}	Uradowan	February 1, 1992	Geisei	T. Seki	·	6.3 km (3.9 mi)	MPC · JPL
7018	1992 DF	—	February 25, 1992	Kushiro	S. Ueda, H. Kaneda	·	4.4 km (2.7 mi)	MPC · JPL
7019 Tagayuichan	1992 EM_{1}	Tagayuichan	March 8, 1992	Dynic	A. Sugie	·	13 km (8.1 mi)	MPC · JPL
7020 Yourcenar	1992 GR_{2}	Yourcenar	April 4, 1992	La Silla	E. W. Elst	NYS	9.1 km (5.7 mi)	MPC · JPL
7021 Tomiokamachi	1992 JN_{1}	Tomiokamachi	May 6, 1992	Dynic	A. Sugie	·	10 km (6.2 mi)	MPC · JPL
7022	1992 JN_{4}	—	May 2, 1992	Kushiro	S. Ueda, H. Kaneda	MAR	7.0 km (4.3 mi)	MPC · JPL
7023 Heiankyo	1992 KE	Heiankyo	May 25, 1992	Dynic	A. Sugie	·	5.8 km (3.6 mi)	MPC · JPL
7024 Impey	1992 PA_{4}	Impey	August 2, 1992	Palomar	H. E. Holt	THM	17 km (11 mi)	MPC · JPL
7025	1993 QA	—	August 16, 1993	Kitt Peak	Spacewatch	AMO · APO +1 km (0.62 mi)	500 m (1,600 ft)	MPC · JPL
7026 Gabrielasilang	1993 QB_{1}	Gabrielasilang	August 19, 1993	Palomar	E. F. Helin	·	2.9 km (1.8 mi)	MPC · JPL
7027 Toshihanda	1993 XT	Toshihanda	December 11, 1993	Oizumi	T. Kobayashi	T_{j} (2.98) · 3:2	24 km (15 mi)	MPC · JPL
7028 Tachikawa	1993 XC_{1}	Tachikawa	December 5, 1993	Nyukasa	M. Hirasawa, S. Suzuki	KOR	7.3 km (4.5 mi)	MPC · JPL
7029	1993 XT_{2}	—	December 14, 1993	Palomar	PCAS	·	18 km (11 mi)	MPC · JPL
7030 Colombini	1993 YU	Colombini	December 18, 1993	Stroncone	Santa Lucia	·	6.5 km (4.0 mi)	MPC · JPL
7031 Kazumiyoshioka	1994 UU	Kazumiyoshioka	October 31, 1994	Nachi-Katsuura	Y. Shimizu, T. Urata	(2076)	3.3 km (2.1 mi)	MPC · JPL
7032 Hitchcock	1994 VC_{2}	Hitchcock	November 3, 1994	Nachi-Katsuura	Y. Shimizu, T. Urata	·	4.8 km (3.0 mi)	MPC · JPL
7033	1994 WN_{2}	—	November 28, 1994	Kushiro	S. Ueda, H. Kaneda	·	4.7 km (2.9 mi)	MPC · JPL
7034	1994 YT_{2}	—	December 25, 1994	Kushiro	S. Ueda, H. Kaneda	V	3.0 km (1.9 mi)	MPC · JPL
7035 Gomi	1995 BD_{3}	Gomi	January 28, 1995	Kitami	K. Endate, K. Watanabe	THM	15 km (9.3 mi)	MPC · JPL
7036 Kentarohirata	1995 BH_{3}	Kentarohirata	January 29, 1995	Nachi-Katsuura	Y. Shimizu, T. Urata	·	19 km (12 mi)	MPC · JPL
7037 Davidlean	1995 BK_{3}	Davidlean	January 29, 1995	Nachi-Katsuura	Y. Shimizu, T. Urata	·	17 km (11 mi)	MPC · JPL
7038 Tokorozawa	1995 DJ_{2}	Tokorozawa	February 22, 1995	Chichibu	N. Satō, T. Urata	THM · slow	14 km (8.7 mi)	MPC · JPL
7039 Yamagata	1996 GO_{2}	Yamagata	April 14, 1996	Nanyo	T. Okuni	V	4.2 km (2.6 mi)	MPC · JPL
7040 Harwood	2642 P-L	Harwood	September 24, 1960	Palomar	C. J. van Houten, I. van Houten-Groeneveld, T. Gehrels	·	3.9 km (2.4 mi)	MPC · JPL
7041 Nantucket	4081 P-L	Nantucket	September 24, 1960	Palomar	C. J. van Houten, I. van Houten-Groeneveld, T. Gehrels	·	3.9 km (2.4 mi)	MPC · JPL
7042 Carver	1933 FE_{1}	Carver	March 24, 1933	Heidelberg	K. Reinmuth	·	4.5 km (2.8 mi)	MPC · JPL
7043 Godart	1934 RB	Godart	September 2, 1934	Uccle	E. Delporte	·	5.7 km (3.5 mi)	MPC · JPL
7044	1971 UK	—	October 26, 1971	Hamburg-Bergedorf	L. Kohoutek	·	3.6 km (2.2 mi)	MPC · JPL
7045	1974 FJ	—	March 22, 1974	Cerro El Roble	C. Torres	·	2.6 km (1.6 mi)	MPC · JPL
7046 Reshetnev	1977 QG_{2}	Reshetnev	August 20, 1977	Nauchnij	N. S. Chernykh	EOS	12 km (7.5 mi)	MPC · JPL
7047 Lundström	1978 RZ_{9}	Lundström	September 2, 1978	La Silla	C.-I. Lagerkvist	PHO	4.3 km (2.7 mi)	MPC · JPL
7048 Chaussidon	1981 EH_{34}	Chaussidon	March 2, 1981	Siding Spring	S. J. Bus	KOR	4.9 km (3.0 mi)	MPC · JPL
7049 Meibom	1981 UV_{21}	Meibom	October 24, 1981	Palomar	S. J. Bus	·	3.7 km (2.3 mi)	MPC · JPL
7050 Shanekelly	1982 FE_{3}	Shanekelly	March 20, 1982	La Silla	H. Debehogne	DOR	16 km (9.9 mi)	MPC · JPL
7051 Sean	1985 JY	Sean	May 13, 1985	Palomar	C. S. Shoemaker, E. M. Shoemaker	THM	15 km (9.3 mi)	MPC · JPL
7052 Octaviabutler	1988 VQ_{2}	Octaviabutler	November 12, 1988	Palomar	E. F. Helin	·	9.1 km (5.7 mi)	MPC · JPL
7053	1989 FA	—	March 28, 1989	Dynic	A. Sugie	·	4.5 km (2.8 mi)	MPC · JPL
7054 Brehm	1989 GL_{8}	Brehm	April 6, 1989	Tautenburg Observatory	F. Börngen	·	3.7 km (2.3 mi)	MPC · JPL
7055 Fabiopagan	1989 KB	Fabiopagan	May 31, 1989	Palomar	H. E. Holt	PHO	6.7 km (4.2 mi)	MPC · JPL
7056 Kierkegaard	1989 SE_{2}	Kierkegaard	September 26, 1989	La Silla	E. W. Elst	AGN	7.6 km (4.7 mi)	MPC · JPL
7057 Al-Fārābī	1990 QL_{2}	Al-Fārābī	August 22, 1990	Palomar	H. E. Holt	·	4.3 km (2.7 mi)	MPC · JPL
7058 Al-Ṭūsī	1990 SN_{1}	Al-Ṭūsī	September 16, 1990	Palomar	H. E. Holt	·	5.6 km (3.5 mi)	MPC · JPL
7059 Van Dokkum	1990 SK_{3}	Van Dokkum	September 18, 1990	Palomar	H. E. Holt	·	3.8 km (2.4 mi)	MPC · JPL
7060 Al-ʻIjliya	1990 SF_{11}	Al-ʻIjliya	September 16, 1990	Palomar	H. E. Holt	·	6.6 km (4.1 mi)	MPC · JPL
7061 Pieri	1991 PE_{1}	Pieri	August 15, 1991	Palomar	E. F. Helin	·	20 km (12 mi)	MPC · JPL
7062 Meslier	1991 PY_{5}	Meslier	August 6, 1991	La Silla	E. W. Elst	TIR	6.6 km (4.1 mi)	MPC · JPL
7063 Johnmichell	1991 UK	Johnmichell	October 18, 1991	Kushiro	S. Ueda, H. Kaneda	·	5.4 km (3.4 mi)	MPC · JPL
7064 Montesquieu	1992 OC_{5}	Montesquieu	July 26, 1992	La Silla	E. W. Elst	THM	14 km (8.7 mi)	MPC · JPL
7065 Fredschaaf	1992 PU_{2}	Fredschaaf	August 2, 1992	Palomar	H. E. Holt	·	16 km (9.9 mi)	MPC · JPL
7066 Nessus	1993 HA_{2}	Nessus	April 26, 1993	Kitt Peak	Spacewatch	centaur	57 km (35 mi)	MPC · JPL
7067 Kiyose	1993 XE	Kiyose	December 4, 1993	Nyukasa	M. Hirasawa, S. Suzuki	EOS	14 km (8.7 mi)	MPC · JPL
7068 Minowa	1994 WD_{1}	Minowa	November 26, 1994	Yatsugatake	Y. Kushida, O. Muramatsu	·	5.8 km (3.6 mi)	MPC · JPL
7069	1994 YG_{2}	—	December 30, 1994	Kushiro	S. Ueda, H. Kaneda	·	10 km (6.2 mi)	MPC · JPL
7070	1994 YO_{2}	—	December 25, 1994	Kushiro	S. Ueda, H. Kaneda	·	4.3 km (2.7 mi)	MPC · JPL
7071	1995 BH_{4}	—	January 28, 1995	Kushiro	S. Ueda, H. Kaneda	·	10 km (6.2 mi)	MPC · JPL
7072 Beijingdaxue	1996 CB_{8}	Beijingdaxue	February 3, 1996	Xinglong	SCAP	·	4.2 km (2.6 mi)	MPC · JPL
7073 Rudbelia	1972 RU_{1}	Rudbelia	September 11, 1972	Nauchnij	N. S. Chernykh	·	2.9 km (1.8 mi)	MPC · JPL
7074 Muckea	1977 RD_{3}	Muckea	September 10, 1977	Nauchnij	N. S. Chernykh	·	3.1 km (1.9 mi)	MPC · JPL
7075 Sadovnichij	1979 SN_{4}	Sadovnichij	September 24, 1979	Nauchnij	N. S. Chernykh	EUN	7.7 km (4.8 mi)	MPC · JPL
7076 Divnýjanko	1980 UC	Divnýjanko	October 30, 1980	Kleť	Z. Vávrová	·	13 km (8.1 mi)	MPC · JPL
7077 Shermanschultz	1982 VZ	Shermanschultz	November 15, 1982	Anderson Mesa	E. Bowell	THM	14 km (8.7 mi)	MPC · JPL
7078 Unojönsson	1985 UH_{3}	Unojönsson	October 17, 1985	Kvistaberg	C.-I. Lagerkvist	NYS ·	9.0 km (5.6 mi)	MPC · JPL
7079 Baghdad	1986 RR	Baghdad	September 5, 1986	Smolyan	E. W. Elst, V. G. Ivanova	·	3.0 km (1.9 mi)	MPC · JPL
7080	1986 RS_{1}	—	September 5, 1986	Kleť	A. Mrkos	(2076)	4.3 km (2.7 mi)	MPC · JPL
7081 Ludibunda	1987 QF_{7}	Ludibunda	August 30, 1987	Zimmerwald	P. Wild	·	10 km (6.2 mi)	MPC · JPL
7082 La Serena	1987 YL_{1}	La Serena	December 17, 1987	La Silla	E. W. Elst, G. Pizarro	slow	9.5 km (5.9 mi)	MPC · JPL
7083 Kant	1989 CL_{3}	Kant	February 4, 1989	La Silla	E. W. Elst	·	13 km (8.1 mi)	MPC · JPL
7084	1991 BR	—	January 19, 1991	Dynic	A. Sugie	·	6.6 km (4.1 mi)	MPC · JPL
7085 Franksienkiewicz	1991 PE	Franksienkiewicz	August 5, 1991	Palomar	H. E. Holt	·	17 km (11 mi)	MPC · JPL
7086 Bopp	1991 TA_{1}	Bopp	October 5, 1991	Palomar	C. S. Shoemaker, E. M. Shoemaker	H	4.0 km (2.5 mi)	MPC · JPL
7087 Lewotsky	1991 TG_{4}	Lewotsky	October 13, 1991	Palomar	E. F. Helin	H	2.6 km (1.6 mi)	MPC · JPL
7088 Ishtar	1992 AA	Ishtar	January 1, 1992	Palomar	C. S. Shoemaker, E. M. Shoemaker	AMO +1 km (0.62 mi) · moon	1.3 km (0.81 mi)	MPC · JPL
7089	1992 FX_{1}	—	March 23, 1992	Kushiro	S. Ueda, H. Kaneda	moon	5.0 km (3.1 mi)	MPC · JPL
7090	1992 HY_{4}	—	April 23, 1992	La Silla	H. Debehogne	·	4.7 km (2.9 mi)	MPC · JPL
7091 Maryfields	1992 JA	Maryfields	May 1, 1992	Palomar	K. J. Lawrence, E. F. Helin	PHO	5.2 km (3.2 mi)	MPC · JPL
7092 Cadmus	1992 LC	Cadmus	June 4, 1992	Palomar	C. S. Shoemaker, E. M. Shoemaker	APO +1 km (0.62 mi) · (887)	6.3 km (3.9 mi)	MPC · JPL
7093 Jonleake	1992 OT	Jonleake	July 26, 1992	Palomar	E. F. Helin	PHO	4.3 km (2.7 mi)	MPC · JPL
7094 Godaisan	1992 RJ	Godaisan	September 4, 1992	Geisei	T. Seki	GEF · slow	8.0 km (5.0 mi)	MPC · JPL
7095 Lamettrie	1992 SB_{22}	Lamettrie	September 22, 1992	La Silla	E. W. Elst	·	7.5 km (4.7 mi)	MPC · JPL
7096 Napier	1992 VM	Napier	November 3, 1992	Siding Spring	R. H. McNaught	·	5.6 km (3.5 mi)	MPC · JPL
7097 Yatsuka	1993 TF	Yatsuka	October 8, 1993	Yatsuka	H. Abe, S. Miyasaka	·	4.7 km (2.9 mi)	MPC · JPL
7098 Réaumur	1993 TK_{39}	Réaumur	October 9, 1993	La Silla	E. W. Elst	slow	9.6 km (6.0 mi)	MPC · JPL
7099 Feuerbach	1996 HX_{25}	Feuerbach	April 20, 1996	La Silla	E. W. Elst	THM	13 km (8.1 mi)	MPC · JPL
7100 Martin Luther	1360 T-2	Martin Luther	September 29, 1973	Palomar	C. J. van Houten, I. van Houten-Groeneveld, T. Gehrels	·	3.8 km (2.4 mi)	MPC · JPL

== 7101–7200 ==
back to top

Designation			Discovery			Properties		Ref
Permanent	Provisional	Named after	Date	Site	Discoverer(s)	Category	Diam.	Ref
7101 Haritina	1930 UX	Haritina	October 17, 1930	Flagstaff	C. W. Tombaugh	·	3.0 km (1.9 mi)	MPC · JPL
7102 Neilbone	1936 NB	Neilbone	July 12, 1936	Johannesburg	C. Jackson	·	21 km (13 mi)	MPC · JPL
7103 Wichmann	1953 GH	Wichmann	April 7, 1953	Heidelberg	K. Reinmuth	EOS	8.8 km (5.5 mi)	MPC · JPL
7104 Manyousyu	1977 DU	Manyousyu	February 18, 1977	Kiso	H. Kosai, K. Furukawa	·	6.2 km (3.9 mi)	MPC · JPL
7105 Yousyozan	1977 DB_{1}	Yousyozan	February 18, 1977	Kiso	H. Kosai, K. Furukawa	NYS	5.1 km (3.2 mi)	MPC · JPL
7106 Kondakov	1978 PM_{3}	Kondakov	August 8, 1978	Nauchnij	N. S. Chernykh	·	7.6 km (4.7 mi)	MPC · JPL
7107 Peiser	1980 PB_{1}	Peiser	August 15, 1980	Kleť	A. Mrkos	·	4.8 km (3.0 mi)	MPC · JPL
7108 Nefedov	1981 RM_{3}	Nefedov	September 2, 1981	Nauchnij	N. S. Chernykh	·	10 km (6.2 mi)	MPC · JPL
7109 Heine	1983 RT_{4}	Heine	September 1, 1983	Nauchnij	L. G. Karachkina	·	10 km (6.2 mi)	MPC · JPL
7110 Johnpearse	1983 XH_{1}	Johnpearse	December 7, 1983	Bickley	Perth Observatory	DOR	14 km (8.7 mi)	MPC · JPL
7111	1985 QA_{1}	—	August 17, 1985	Palomar	E. F. Helin	·	6.1 km (3.8 mi)	MPC · JPL
7112 Ghislaine	1986 GV	Ghislaine	April 3, 1986	Palomar	C. S. Shoemaker, E. M. Shoemaker	·	11 km (6.8 mi)	MPC · JPL
7113 Ostapbender	1986 SD_{2}	Ostapbender	September 29, 1986	Nauchnij	L. G. Karachkina	·	18 km (11 mi)	MPC · JPL
7114 Weinek	1986 WN_{7}	Weinek	November 29, 1986	Kleť	A. Mrkos	(1298)	14 km (8.7 mi)	MPC · JPL
7115 Franciscuszeno	1986 WO_{7}	Franciscuszeno	November 29, 1986	Kleť	A. Mrkos	HYG	8.8 km (5.5 mi)	MPC · JPL
7116 Mentall	1986 XX	Mentall	December 2, 1986	Anderson Mesa	E. Bowell	·	7.4 km (4.6 mi)	MPC · JPL
7117 Claudius	1988 CA_{1}	Claudius	February 14, 1988	Tautenburg Observatory	F. Börngen	·	3.2 km (2.0 mi)	MPC · JPL
7118 Kuklov	1988 VD_{5}	Kuklov	November 4, 1988	Kleť	A. Mrkos	EUN	10 km (6.2 mi)	MPC · JPL
7119 Hiera	1989 AV_{2}	Hiera	January 11, 1989	Palomar	C. S. Shoemaker, E. M. Shoemaker	L4 · slow?	59 km (37 mi)	MPC · JPL
7120 Davidgavine	1989 AD_{3}	Davidgavine	January 4, 1989	Siding Spring	R. H. McNaught	KOR	7.6 km (4.7 mi)	MPC · JPL
7121 Busch	1989 AL_{7}	Busch	January 10, 1989	Tautenburg Observatory	F. Börngen	KOR	5.2 km (3.2 mi)	MPC · JPL
7122 Iwasaki	1989 EN_{2}	Iwasaki	March 12, 1989	Kitami	K. Endate, K. Watanabe	·	3.1 km (1.9 mi)	MPC · JPL
7123	1989 TT_{1}	—	October 9, 1989	Okutama	Hioki, T., N. Kawasato	·	5.4 km (3.4 mi)	MPC · JPL
7124 Glinos	1990 OJ_{4}	Glinos	July 24, 1990	Palomar	H. E. Holt	·	15 km (9.3 mi)	MPC · JPL
7125 Eitarodate	1991 CN_{1}	Eitarodate	February 7, 1991	Geisei	T. Seki	NYS ·	8.7 km (5.4 mi)	MPC · JPL
7126 Cureau	1991 GJ_{4}	Cureau	April 8, 1991	La Silla	E. W. Elst	KOR	5.7 km (3.5 mi)	MPC · JPL
7127 Stifter	1991 RD_{3}	Stifter	September 9, 1991	Tautenburg Observatory	F. Börngen, L. D. Schmadel	·	13 km (8.1 mi)	MPC · JPL
7128 Misawa	1991 SM_{1}	Misawa	September 30, 1991	Kitami	K. Endate, K. Watanabe	·	14 km (8.7 mi)	MPC · JPL
7129	1991 VE_{1}	—	November 4, 1991	Kushiro	S. Ueda, H. Kaneda	·	6.2 km (3.9 mi)	MPC · JPL
7130 Klepper	1992 HR_{4}	Klepper	April 30, 1992	Tautenburg Observatory	F. Börngen	·	3.9 km (2.4 mi)	MPC · JPL
7131 Longtom	1992 YL	Longtom	December 23, 1992	Yakiimo	Natori, A., T. Urata	·	30 km (19 mi)	MPC · JPL
7132 Casulli	1993 SE	Casulli	September 17, 1993	Stroncone	Santa Lucia	moon	9.0 km (5.6 mi)	MPC · JPL
7133 Kasahara	1993 TX_{1}	Kasahara	October 15, 1993	Kitami	K. Endate, K. Watanabe	PHO	5.8 km (3.6 mi)	MPC · JPL
7134 Ikeuchisatoru	1993 UY	Ikeuchisatoru	October 24, 1993	Oizumi	T. Kobayashi	·	6.4 km (4.0 mi)	MPC · JPL
7135	1993 VO	—	November 5, 1993	Nachi-Katsuura	Y. Shimizu, T. Urata	·	4.0 km (2.5 mi)	MPC · JPL
7136 Yokohasuo	1993 VK_{2}	Yokohasuo	November 14, 1993	Fujieda	Shiozawa, H., T. Urata	MAR	6.5 km (4.0 mi)	MPC · JPL
7137 Ageo	1994 AQ_{1}	Ageo	January 4, 1994	Kiyosato	S. Otomo	AGN	7.1 km (4.4 mi)	MPC · JPL
7138	1994 AK_{15}	—	January 15, 1994	Kushiro	S. Ueda, H. Kaneda	slow	4.3 km (2.7 mi)	MPC · JPL
7139 Tsubokawa	1994 CV_{2}	Tsubokawa	February 14, 1994	Ojima	T. Niijima, T. Urata	EOS	8.8 km (5.5 mi)	MPC · JPL
7140 Osaki	1994 EE_{1}	Osaki	March 4, 1994	Oizumi	T. Kobayashi	·	4.6 km (2.9 mi)	MPC · JPL
7141 Bettarini	1994 EZ_{1}	Bettarini	March 12, 1994	Cima Ekar	A. Boattini, M. Tombelli	GEF	6.8 km (4.2 mi)	MPC · JPL
7142 Spinoza	1994 PC_{19}	Spinoza	August 12, 1994	La Silla	E. W. Elst	THM	20 km (12 mi)	MPC · JPL
7143 Haramura	1995 WU_{41}	Haramura	November 17, 1995	Kiyosato	S. Otomo	·	12 km (7.5 mi)	MPC · JPL
7144 Dossobuono	1996 KQ	Dossobuono	May 20, 1996	Dossobuono	Lai, L.	·	4.9 km (3.0 mi)	MPC · JPL
7145 Linzexu	1996 LO	Linzexu	June 7, 1996	Xinglong	SCAP	·	7.3 km (4.5 mi)	MPC · JPL
7146 Konradin	3034 P-L	Konradin	September 24, 1960	Palomar	C. J. van Houten, I. van Houten-Groeneveld, T. Gehrels	EOS	7.4 km (4.6 mi)	MPC · JPL
7147 Feijth	4015 P-L	Feijth	September 24, 1960	Palomar	C. J. van Houten, I. van Houten-Groeneveld, T. Gehrels	NYS	4.2 km (2.6 mi)	MPC · JPL
7148 Reinholdbien	1047 T-1	Reinholdbien	March 25, 1971	Palomar	C. J. van Houten, I. van Houten-Groeneveld, T. Gehrels	·	6.1 km (3.8 mi)	MPC · JPL
7149 Bernie	3220 T-3	Bernie	October 16, 1977	Palomar	C. J. van Houten, I. van Houten-Groeneveld, T. Gehrels	THM	9.6 km (6.0 mi)	MPC · JPL
7150 McKellar	1929 TD_{1}	McKellar	October 11, 1929	Flagstaff	C. W. Tombaugh	NYS	8.4 km (5.2 mi)	MPC · JPL
7151	1971 SX_{3}	—	September 26, 1971	Cerro El Roble	C. Torres	EUN	9.4 km (5.8 mi)	MPC · JPL
7152 Euneus	1973 SH_{1}	Euneus	September 19, 1973	Palomar	C. J. van Houten, I. van Houten-Groeneveld, T. Gehrels	L4	40 km (25 mi)	MPC · JPL
7153 Vladzakharov	1975 XP_{3}	Vladzakharov	December 2, 1975	Nauchnij	T. M. Smirnova	slow	7.5 km (4.7 mi)	MPC · JPL
7154 Zhangmaolin	1979 MJ_{5}	Zhangmaolin	June 25, 1979	Siding Spring	E. F. Helin, S. J. Bus	·	2.7 km (1.7 mi)	MPC · JPL
7155	1979 YN	—	December 23, 1979	La Silla	H. Debehogne, Netto, E. R.	EOS	8.3 km (5.2 mi)	MPC · JPL
7156 Flaviofusipecci	1981 EC_{2}	Flaviofusipecci	March 4, 1981	La Silla	H. Debehogne, G. de Sanctis	ADE	12 km (7.5 mi)	MPC · JPL
7157 Lofgren	1981 EC_{8}	Lofgren	March 1, 1981	Siding Spring	S. J. Bus	·	3.3 km (2.1 mi)	MPC · JPL
7158 IRTF	1981 ES_{8}	IRTF	March 1, 1981	Siding Spring	S. J. Bus	EOS	10 km (6.2 mi)	MPC · JPL
7159 Bobjoseph	1981 EN_{17}	Bobjoseph	March 1, 1981	Siding Spring	S. J. Bus	·	3.8 km (2.4 mi)	MPC · JPL
7160 Tokunaga	1981 UQ_{29}	Tokunaga	October 24, 1981	Palomar	S. J. Bus	·	5.1 km (3.2 mi)	MPC · JPL
7161 Golitsyn	1982 UY_{10}	Golitsyn	October 25, 1982	Nauchnij	L. V. Zhuravleva	NYS	4.0 km (2.5 mi)	MPC · JPL
7162 Sidwell	1982 VB_{1}	Sidwell	November 15, 1982	Anderson Mesa	E. Bowell	V	2.9 km (1.8 mi)	MPC · JPL
7163 Barenboim	1984 DB	Barenboim	February 24, 1984	Palomar	E. F. Helin, R. S. Dunbar	PHO	2.6 km (1.6 mi)	MPC · JPL
7164 Babadzhanov	1984 ET	Babadzhanov	March 6, 1984	Anderson Mesa	E. Bowell	·	4.4 km (2.7 mi)	MPC · JPL
7165 Pendleton	1985 RH	Pendleton	September 14, 1985	Anderson Mesa	E. Bowell	EUN	7.0 km (4.3 mi)	MPC · JPL
7166 Kennedy	1985 TR	Kennedy	October 15, 1985	Anderson Mesa	E. Bowell	·	5.1 km (3.2 mi)	MPC · JPL
7167 Laupheim	1985 TD_{3}	Laupheim	October 12, 1985	Palomar	C. S. Shoemaker, E. M. Shoemaker	·	23 km (14 mi)	MPC · JPL
7168	1986 QE_{2}	—	August 28, 1986	La Silla	H. Debehogne	·	3.3 km (2.1 mi)	MPC · JPL
7169 Linda	1986 TK_{1}	Linda	October 4, 1986	Anderson Mesa	E. Bowell	(883)	4.1 km (2.5 mi)	MPC · JPL
7170 Livesey	1987 MK	Livesey	June 30, 1987	Siding Spring	R. H. McNaught	EUN	9.7 km (6.0 mi)	MPC · JPL
7171 Arthurkraus	1988 AT_{1}	Arthurkraus	January 13, 1988	Kleť	A. Mrkos	·	9.7 km (6.0 mi)	MPC · JPL
7172 Multatuli	1988 DE_{2}	Multatuli	February 17, 1988	La Silla	E. W. Elst	NYS	3.9 km (2.4 mi)	MPC · JPL
7173 Sepkoski	1988 PL_{1}	Sepkoski	August 15, 1988	Palomar	C. S. Shoemaker, E. M. Shoemaker	H	4.1 km (2.5 mi)	MPC · JPL
7174 Semois	1988 SQ	Semois	September 18, 1988	La Silla	H. Debehogne	T_{j} (2.99) · 3:2	26 km (16 mi)	MPC · JPL
7175 Janegoodall	1988 TN_{2}	Janegoodall	October 11, 1988	Kleť	Z. Vávrová	·	6.5 km (4.0 mi)	MPC · JPL
7176 Kuniji	1989 XH	Kuniji	December 1, 1989	Kitami	K. Endate, K. Watanabe	GEF	6.7 km (4.2 mi)	MPC · JPL
7177 Melvyntaylor	1990 TF	Melvyntaylor	October 9, 1990	Siding Spring	R. H. McNaught	EUN	7.4 km (4.6 mi)	MPC · JPL
7178 Ikuookamoto	1990 VA_{3}	Ikuookamoto	November 11, 1990	Minami-Oda	T. Nomura, K. Kawanishi	·	4.6 km (2.9 mi)	MPC · JPL
7179 Gassendi	1991 GQ_{6}	Gassendi	April 8, 1991	La Silla	E. W. Elst	·	7.0 km (4.3 mi)	MPC · JPL
7180	1991 NG_{1}	—	July 12, 1991	Palomar	H. E. Holt	EOS	8.9 km (5.5 mi)	MPC · JPL
7181	1991 PH_{12}	—	August 7, 1991	Palomar	H. E. Holt	slow	15 km (9.3 mi)	MPC · JPL
7182 Robinvaughan	1991 RV_{1}	Robinvaughan	September 8, 1991	Palomar	E. F. Helin	·	15 km (9.3 mi)	MPC · JPL
7183	1991 RE_{16}	—	September 15, 1991	Palomar	H. E. Holt	EOS · slow	12 km (7.5 mi)	MPC · JPL
7184	1991 RB_{25}	—	September 11, 1991	Palomar	H. E. Holt	·	6.4 km (4.0 mi)	MPC · JPL
7185	1991 VN_{1}	—	November 4, 1991	Kushiro	S. Ueda, H. Kaneda	·	4.4 km (2.7 mi)	MPC · JPL
7186 Tomioka	1991 YF	Tomioka	December 26, 1991	Kitami	K. Endate, K. Watanabe	·	13 km (8.1 mi)	MPC · JPL
7187 Isobe	1992 BW	Isobe	January 30, 1992	Palomar	E. F. Helin	H · moon	5.4 km (3.4 mi)	MPC · JPL
7188 Yoshii	1992 SF_{1}	Yoshii	September 23, 1992	Kitami	K. Endate, K. Watanabe	slow?	4.1 km (2.5 mi)	MPC · JPL
7189 Kuniko	1992 SX_{12}	Kuniko	September 28, 1992	Kitami	K. Endate, K. Watanabe	·	4.0 km (2.5 mi)	MPC · JPL
7190	1993 GB_{1}	—	April 15, 1993	Palomar	H. E. Holt	·	4.0 km (2.5 mi)	MPC · JPL
7191	1993 MA_{1}	—	June 18, 1993	Palomar	H. E. Holt	·	11 km (6.8 mi)	MPC · JPL
7192 Cieletespace	1993 RY_{1}	Cieletespace	September 12, 1993	Kitami	K. Endate, K. Watanabe	EOS	15 km (9.3 mi)	MPC · JPL
7193 Yamaoka	1993 SE_{2}	Yamaoka	September 19, 1993	Kitami	K. Endate, K. Watanabe	·	8.3 km (5.2 mi)	MPC · JPL
7194 Susanrose	1993 SR_{3}	Susanrose	September 18, 1993	Palomar	H. E. Holt	·	7.1 km (4.4 mi)	MPC · JPL
7195 Danboice	1994 AJ	Danboice	January 2, 1994	Oizumi	T. Kobayashi	·	5.5 km (3.4 mi)	MPC · JPL
7196 Baroni	1994 BF	Baroni	January 16, 1994	Cima Ekar	A. Boattini, M. Tombelli	·	4.9 km (3.0 mi)	MPC · JPL
7197 Pieroangela	1994 BH	Pieroangela	January 16, 1994	Cima Ekar	A. Boattini, M. Tombelli	·	5.2 km (3.2 mi)	MPC · JPL
7198 Montelupo	1994 BJ	Montelupo	January 16, 1994	Cima Ekar	A. Boattini, M. Tombelli	EUN	9.7 km (6.0 mi)	MPC · JPL
7199 Brianza	1994 FR	Brianza	March 28, 1994	Sormano	M. Cavagna, Giuliani, V.	KOR	5.6 km (3.5 mi)	MPC · JPL
7200	1994 NO	—	July 8, 1994	Catalina Station	T. B. Spahr	·	11 km (6.8 mi)	MPC · JPL

== 7201–7300 ==
back to top

Designation			Discovery			Properties		Ref
Permanent	Provisional	Named after	Date	Site	Discoverer(s)	Category	Diam.	Ref
7201 Kuritariku	1994 UF_{1}	Kuritariku	October 25, 1994	Kiyosato	S. Otomo	V	5.5 km (3.4 mi)	MPC · JPL
7202 Kigoshi	1995 DX_{1}	Kigoshi	February 19, 1995	Ojima	T. Niijima, T. Urata	DOR	9.9 km (6.2 mi)	MPC · JPL
7203 Sigeki	1995 DG_{2}	Sigeki	February 27, 1995	Kiyosato	S. Otomo	·	5.8 km (3.6 mi)	MPC · JPL
7204 Ondřejov	1995 GH	Ondřejov	April 3, 1995	Ondřejov	P. Pravec	·	5.7 km (3.5 mi)	MPC · JPL
7205 Sadanori	1995 YE_{1}	Sadanori	December 21, 1995	Oizumi	T. Kobayashi	·	5.3 km (3.3 mi)	MPC · JPL
7206 Shiki	1996 QT	Shiki	August 18, 1996	Kuma Kogen	A. Nakamura	EOS	9.9 km (6.2 mi)	MPC · JPL
7207 Hammurabi	2133 P-L	Hammurabi	September 24, 1960	Palomar	C. J. van Houten, I. van Houten-Groeneveld, T. Gehrels	·	5.1 km (3.2 mi)	MPC · JPL
7208 Ashurbanipal	2645 P-L	Ashurbanipal	September 24, 1960	Palomar	C. J. van Houten, I. van Houten-Groeneveld, T. Gehrels	·	5.0 km (3.1 mi)	MPC · JPL
7209 Cyrus	3523 P-L	Cyrus	October 17, 1960	Palomar	C. J. van Houten, I. van Houten-Groeneveld, T. Gehrels	·	6.4 km (4.0 mi)	MPC · JPL
7210 Darius	6555 P-L	Darius	September 24, 1960	Palomar	C. J. van Houten, I. van Houten-Groeneveld, T. Gehrels	KOR	8.2 km (5.1 mi)	MPC · JPL
7211 Xerxes	1240 T-1	Xerxes	March 25, 1971	Palomar	C. J. van Houten, I. van Houten-Groeneveld, T. Gehrels	GEF	6.4 km (4.0 mi)	MPC · JPL
7212 Artaxerxes	2155 T-2	Artaxerxes	September 29, 1973	Palomar	C. J. van Houten, I. van Houten-Groeneveld, T. Gehrels	·	2.7 km (1.7 mi)	MPC · JPL
7213 Conae	1967 KB	Conae	May 31, 1967	El Leoncito	Félix Aguilar Observatory	·	4.3 km (2.7 mi)	MPC · JPL
7214 Anticlus	1973 SM_{1}	Anticlus	September 19, 1973	Palomar	C. J. van Houten, I. van Houten-Groeneveld, T. Gehrels	L4	20 km (12 mi)	MPC · JPL
7215 Gerhard	1977 FS	Gerhard	March 16, 1977	La Silla	H.-E. Schuster	·	24 km (15 mi)	MPC · JPL
7216 Ishkov	1977 QQ_{2}	Ishkov	August 21, 1977	Nauchnij	N. S. Chernykh	·	3.3 km (2.1 mi)	MPC · JPL
7217 Dacke	1979 QX_{3}	Dacke	August 22, 1979	La Silla	C.-I. Lagerkvist	·	24 km (15 mi)	MPC · JPL
7218 Skácel	1979 SK	Skácel	September 19, 1979	Kleť	Kveton, J.	·	3.2 km (2.0 mi)	MPC · JPL
7219 Satterwhite	1981 EZ_{47}	Satterwhite	March 3, 1981	Siding Spring	S. J. Bus	·	2.9 km (1.8 mi)	MPC · JPL
7220 Philnicholson	1981 QE	Philnicholson	August 30, 1981	Anderson Mesa	E. Bowell	NYS	3.5 km (2.2 mi)	MPC · JPL
7221 Sallaba	1981 SJ	Sallaba	September 22, 1981	Kleť	Z. Vávrová	NYS	2.6 km (1.6 mi)	MPC · JPL
7222 Alekperov	1981 TJ_{3}	Alekperov	October 7, 1981	Nauchnij	T. M. Smirnova	·	16 km (9.9 mi)	MPC · JPL
7223 Dolgorukij	1982 TF_{2}	Dolgorukij	October 14, 1982	Nauchnij	L. V. Zhuravleva, L. G. Karachkina	·	4.0 km (2.5 mi)	MPC · JPL
7224 Vesnina	1982 TK_{3}	Vesnina	October 15, 1982	Nauchnij	L. V. Zhuravleva	·	8.7 km (5.4 mi)	MPC · JPL
7225 Huntress	1983 BH	Huntress	January 22, 1983	Anderson Mesa	E. Bowell	moon	6.7 km (4.2 mi)	MPC · JPL
7226 Kryl	1984 QJ	Kryl	August 21, 1984	Kleť	A. Mrkos	THM	16 km (9.9 mi)	MPC · JPL
7227	1984 SH_{6}	—	September 22, 1984	La Silla	H. Debehogne	·	3.8 km (2.4 mi)	MPC · JPL
7228 MacGillivray	1985 GO	MacGillivray	April 15, 1985	Anderson Mesa	E. Bowell	·	4.7 km (2.9 mi)	MPC · JPL
7229 Tonimoore	1985 RV	Tonimoore	September 12, 1985	Kitt Peak	Spacewatch	·	4.8 km (3.0 mi)	MPC · JPL
7230 Lutz	1985 RZ_{1}	Lutz	September 12, 1985	Anderson Mesa	E. Bowell	·	6.6 km (4.1 mi)	MPC · JPL
7231 Porco	1985 TQ_{1}	Porco	October 15, 1985	Anderson Mesa	E. Bowell	VER	18 km (11 mi)	MPC · JPL
7232 Nabokov	1985 UQ	Nabokov	October 20, 1985	Kleť	A. Mrkos	·	7.6 km (4.7 mi)	MPC · JPL
7233 Majella	1986 EQ_{5}	Majella	March 7, 1986	La Silla	G. de Sanctis	·	10 km (6.2 mi)	MPC · JPL
7234	1986 QV_{3}	—	August 29, 1986	La Silla	H. Debehogne	·	4.6 km (2.9 mi)	MPC · JPL
7235 Hitsuzan	1986 UY	Hitsuzan	October 30, 1986	Geisei	T. Seki	·	3.8 km (2.4 mi)	MPC · JPL
7236	1987 PA	—	August 1, 1987	Palomar	Phinney, J.	AMO	770 m (2,530 ft)	MPC · JPL
7237 Vickyhamilton	1988 VH	Vickyhamilton	November 3, 1988	Toyota	K. Suzuki, T. Furuta	·	7.5 km (4.7 mi)	MPC · JPL
7238 Kobori	1989 OA	Kobori	July 27, 1989	Kani	Y. Mizuno, T. Furuta	·	4.9 km (3.0 mi)	MPC · JPL
7239 Mobberley	1989 TE	Mobberley	October 4, 1989	Stakenbridge	B. G. W. Manning	·	2.8 km (1.7 mi)	MPC · JPL
7240 Hasebe	1989 YG	Hasebe	December 19, 1989	Kani	Y. Mizuno, T. Furuta	·	3.3 km (2.1 mi)	MPC · JPL
7241 Kuroda	1990 VF_{3}	Kuroda	November 11, 1990	Kitami	K. Endate, K. Watanabe	·	4.8 km (3.0 mi)	MPC · JPL
7242 Okyudo	1990 VG_{3}	Okyudo	November 11, 1990	Kitami	K. Endate, K. Watanabe	·	2.7 km (1.7 mi)	MPC · JPL
7243	1990 VV_{3}	—	November 12, 1990	Kushiro	S. Ueda, H. Kaneda	·	4.7 km (2.9 mi)	MPC · JPL
7244 Villa-Lobos	1991 PQ_{1}	Villa-Lobos	August 5, 1991	La Silla	E. W. Elst	KOR	7.5 km (4.7 mi)	MPC · JPL
7245	1991 RN_{10}	—	September 10, 1991	Palomar	H. E. Holt	·	8.1 km (5.0 mi)	MPC · JPL
7246	1991 RP_{25}	—	September 12, 1991	Palomar	H. E. Holt	·	12 km (7.5 mi)	MPC · JPL
7247 Robertstirling	1991 TD_{1}	Robertstirling	October 12, 1991	Siding Spring	R. H. McNaught	H	2.6 km (1.6 mi)	MPC · JPL
7248 Älvsjö	1992 EV_{21}	Älvsjö	March 1, 1992	La Silla	UESAC	·	4.0 km (2.5 mi)	MPC · JPL
7249	1992 SN	—	September 26, 1992	Dynic	A. Sugie	·	8.4 km (5.2 mi)	MPC · JPL
7250 Kinoshita	1992 SG_{1}	Kinoshita	September 23, 1992	Kitami	K. Endate, K. Watanabe	·	5.5 km (3.4 mi)	MPC · JPL
7251 Kuwabara	1992 SF_{13}	Kuwabara	September 30, 1992	Kitami	K. Endate, K. Watanabe	·	4.8 km (3.0 mi)	MPC · JPL
7252 Kakegawa	1992 UZ	Kakegawa	October 21, 1992	Oohira	T. Urata	·	10 km (6.2 mi)	MPC · JPL
7253 Nara	1993 CL	Nara	February 13, 1993	Kashihara	F. Uto	·	22 km (14 mi)	MPC · JPL
7254 Kuratani	1993 TN_{1}	Kuratani	October 15, 1993	Kitami	K. Endate, K. Watanabe	·	3.3 km (2.1 mi)	MPC · JPL
7255	1993 VY_{1}	—	November 11, 1993	Kushiro	S. Ueda, H. Kaneda	(2076)	6.6 km (4.1 mi)	MPC · JPL
7256 Bonhoeffer	1993 VJ_{5}	Bonhoeffer	November 11, 1993	Tautenburg Observatory	F. Börngen	·	4.8 km (3.0 mi)	MPC · JPL
7257 Yoshiya	1994 AH_{1}	Yoshiya	January 7, 1994	Oizumi	T. Kobayashi	·	5.2 km (3.2 mi)	MPC · JPL
7258 Pettarin	1994 EF	Pettarin	March 5, 1994	Stroncone	Santa Lucia	EUN	6.6 km (4.1 mi)	MPC · JPL
7259 Gaithersburg	1994 EG_{1}	Gaithersburg	March 6, 1994	Nachi-Katsuura	Y. Shimizu, T. Urata	EUN	6.6 km (4.1 mi)	MPC · JPL
7260 Metelli	1994 FN	Metelli	March 18, 1994	Stroncone	Santa Lucia	KOR	6.4 km (4.0 mi)	MPC · JPL
7261 Yokootakeo	1994 GZ	Yokootakeo	April 14, 1994	Oizumi	T. Kobayashi	·	8.1 km (5.0 mi)	MPC · JPL
7262 Sofue	1995 BX_{1}	Sofue	January 27, 1995	Oizumi	T. Kobayashi	·	5.4 km (3.4 mi)	MPC · JPL
7263 Takayamada	1995 DP	Takayamada	February 21, 1995	Oizumi	T. Kobayashi	·	3.4 km (2.1 mi)	MPC · JPL
7264 Hirohatanaka	1995 FK	Hirohatanaka	March 26, 1995	Nachi-Katsuura	Y. Shimizu, T. Urata	·	3.1 km (1.9 mi)	MPC · JPL
7265 Edithmüller	2908 T-2	Edithmüller	September 30, 1973	Palomar	C. J. van Houten, I. van Houten-Groeneveld, T. Gehrels	V	3.4 km (2.1 mi)	MPC · JPL
7266 Trefftz	4270 T-2	Trefftz	September 29, 1973	Palomar	C. J. van Houten, I. van Houten-Groeneveld, T. Gehrels	·	3.2 km (2.0 mi)	MPC · JPL
7267 Victormeen	1943 DF	Victormeen	February 23, 1943	Turku	L. Oterma	·	4.4 km (2.7 mi)	MPC · JPL
7268 Chigorin	1972 TF	Chigorin	October 3, 1972	Nauchnij	L. V. Zhuravleva	·	4.2 km (2.6 mi)	MPC · JPL
7269 Alprokhorov	1975 VK_{2}	Alprokhorov	November 2, 1975	Nauchnij	T. M. Smirnova	·	6.9 km (4.3 mi)	MPC · JPL
7270 Punkin	1978 NY_{7}	Punkin	July 7, 1978	Palomar	E. Bowell	THM	15 km (9.3 mi)	MPC · JPL
7271 Doroguntsov	1979 SR_{2}	Doroguntsov	September 22, 1979	Nauchnij	N. S. Chernykh	·	7.8 km (4.8 mi)	MPC · JPL
7272 Darbydyar	1980 DD_{1}	Darbydyar	February 21, 1980	Kleť	Z. Vávrová	GEF	8.0 km (5.0 mi)	MPC · JPL
7273 Garyhuss	1981 EK_{4}	Garyhuss	March 2, 1981	Siding Spring	S. J. Bus	EUN	4.7 km (2.9 mi)	MPC · JPL
7274 Washioyama	1982 FC	Washioyama	March 21, 1982	Geisei	T. Seki	·	8.8 km (5.5 mi)	MPC · JPL
7275 Earlcarpenter	1983 CY_{2}	Earlcarpenter	February 15, 1983	Anderson Mesa	N. G. Thomas	EOS	13 km (8.1 mi)	MPC · JPL
7276 Maymie	1983 RE	Maymie	September 4, 1983	Harvard Observatory	Oak Ridge Observatory	slow	3.8 km (2.4 mi)	MPC · JPL
7277 Klass	1983 RM_{2}	Klass	September 4, 1983	Anderson Mesa	E. Bowell	·	8.9 km (5.5 mi)	MPC · JPL
7278 Shtokolov	1985 UW_{4}	Shtokolov	October 22, 1985	Nauchnij	L. V. Zhuravleva	slow	20 km (12 mi)	MPC · JPL
7279 Hagfors	1985 VD_{1}	Hagfors	November 7, 1985	Anderson Mesa	E. Bowell	HYG	13 km (8.1 mi)	MPC · JPL
7280 Bergengruen	1988 RA_{3}	Bergengruen	September 8, 1988	Tautenburg Observatory	F. Börngen	·	3.3 km (2.1 mi)	MPC · JPL
7281	1988 RX_{4}	—	September 2, 1988	La Silla	H. Debehogne	NYS	3.9 km (2.4 mi)	MPC · JPL
7282	1989 BC	—	January 29, 1989	Kushiro	S. Ueda, H. Kaneda	·	14 km (8.7 mi)	MPC · JPL
7283	1989 TX_{15}	—	October 4, 1989	La Silla	H. Debehogne	(2076)	4.1 km (2.5 mi)	MPC · JPL
7284	1989 VW	—	November 4, 1989	Gekko	Y. Oshima	3:2	23 km (14 mi)	MPC · JPL
7285 Seggewiss	1990 EX_{2}	Seggewiss	March 2, 1990	La Silla	E. W. Elst	·	7.0 km (4.3 mi)	MPC · JPL
7286	1990 QZ_{4}	—	August 24, 1990	Palomar	H. E. Holt	·	22 km (14 mi)	MPC · JPL
7287 Yokokurayama	1990 VN_{2}	Yokokurayama	November 10, 1990	Geisei	T. Seki	·	14 km (8.7 mi)	MPC · JPL
7288	1991 FE_{1}	—	March 18, 1991	Dynic	A. Sugie	·	5.5 km (3.4 mi)	MPC · JPL
7289 Kamegamori	1991 JU	Kamegamori	May 5, 1991	Geisei	T. Seki	·	5.3 km (3.3 mi)	MPC · JPL
7290 Johnrather	1991 JY_{1}	Johnrather	May 11, 1991	Palomar	E. F. Helin	·	7.1 km (4.4 mi)	MPC · JPL
7291 Hyakutake	1991 XC_{1}	Hyakutake	December 13, 1991	Kiyosato	S. Otomo	slow	16 km (9.9 mi)	MPC · JPL
7292 Prosperin	1992 EM_{7}	Prosperin	March 1, 1992	La Silla	UESAC	·	4.2 km (2.6 mi)	MPC · JPL
7293 Kazuyuki	1992 FH	Kazuyuki	March 23, 1992	Kitami	K. Endate, K. Watanabe	·	5.2 km (3.2 mi)	MPC · JPL
7294 Barbaraakey	1992 LM	Barbaraakey	June 3, 1992	Palomar	G. J. Leonard	·	7.0 km (4.3 mi)	MPC · JPL
7295 Brozović	1992 MB	Brozović	June 22, 1992	Kushiro	S. Ueda, H. Kaneda	·	5.0 km (3.1 mi)	MPC · JPL
7296 Lamarck	1992 PW_{1}	Lamarck	August 8, 1992	Caussols	E. W. Elst, C. Pollas	·	3.7 km (2.3 mi)	MPC · JPL
7297	1992 UG	—	October 21, 1992	Dynic	A. Sugie	·	5.9 km (3.7 mi)	MPC · JPL
7298 Matudaira-gou	1992 WM_{5}	Matudaira-gou	November 26, 1992	Toyota	K. Suzuki, T. Urata	·	5.0 km (3.1 mi)	MPC · JPL
7299 Indiawadkins	1992 WZ_{5}	Indiawadkins	November 21, 1992	Palomar	E. F. Helin	·	12 km (7.5 mi)	MPC · JPL
7300 Yoshisada	1992 YV_{2}	Yoshisada	December 26, 1992	Oohira	T. Urata	·	6.6 km (4.1 mi)	MPC · JPL

== 7301–7400 ==
back to top

Designation			Discovery			Properties		Ref
Permanent	Provisional	Named after	Date	Site	Discoverer(s)	Category	Diam.	Ref
7301 Matsuitakafumi	1993 AB	Matsuitakafumi	January 2, 1993	Yakiimo	Natori, A., T. Urata	·	6.2 km (3.9 mi)	MPC · JPL
7302	1993 CQ	—	February 10, 1993	Kushiro	S. Ueda, H. Kaneda	·	8.4 km (5.2 mi)	MPC · JPL
7303	1993 FS_{1}	—	March 25, 1993	Kushiro	S. Ueda, H. Kaneda	EOS	13 km (8.1 mi)	MPC · JPL
7304 Namiki	1994 AE_{2}	Namiki	January 9, 1994	Oizumi	T. Kobayashi	·	6.4 km (4.0 mi)	MPC · JPL
7305 Ossakajusto	1994 CX_{1}	Ossakajusto	February 8, 1994	Kitami	K. Endate, K. Watanabe	·	24 km (15 mi)	MPC · JPL
7306 Panizon	1994 EH	Panizon	March 6, 1994	Stroncone	Santa Lucia	BAR	5.5 km (3.4 mi)	MPC · JPL
7307 Takei	1994 GT_{9}	Takei	April 13, 1994	Nachi-Katsuura	Y. Shimizu, T. Urata	moon	10 km (6.2 mi)	MPC · JPL
7308 Hattori	1995 BQ_{4}	Hattori	January 31, 1995	Nachi-Katsuura	Y. Shimizu, T. Urata	EOS	10 km (6.2 mi)	MPC · JPL
7309 Shinkawakami	1995 FU	Shinkawakami	March 28, 1995	Oizumi	T. Kobayashi	·	5.6 km (3.5 mi)	MPC · JPL
7310	1995 OL_{1}	—	July 19, 1995	Xinglong	SCAP	·	9.3 km (5.8 mi)	MPC · JPL
7311 Hildehan	1995 TU	Hildehan	October 14, 1995	Sudbury	D. di Cicco	KOR	6.0 km (3.7 mi)	MPC · JPL
7312	1996 AT_{3}	—	January 13, 1996	Kushiro	S. Ueda, H. Kaneda	·	8.0 km (5.0 mi)	MPC · JPL
7313 Pisano	6207 P-L	Pisano	September 24, 1960	Palomar	C. J. van Houten, I. van Houten-Groeneveld, T. Gehrels	·	3.3 km (2.1 mi)	MPC · JPL
7314 Pevsner	2146 T-1	Pevsner	March 25, 1971	Palomar	C. J. van Houten, I. van Houten-Groeneveld, T. Gehrels	THM · slow ·	11 km (6.8 mi)	MPC · JPL
7315 Kolbe	1136 T-2	Kolbe	September 29, 1973	Palomar	C. J. van Houten, I. van Houten-Groeneveld, T. Gehrels	(5)	5.6 km (3.5 mi)	MPC · JPL
7316 Hajdú	3145 T-2	Hajdú	September 30, 1973	Palomar	C. J. van Houten, I. van Houten-Groeneveld, T. Gehrels	·	5.4 km (3.4 mi)	MPC · JPL
7317 Cabot	1940 ED	Cabot	March 12, 1940	Konkoly	G. Kulin	·	5.4 km (3.4 mi)	MPC · JPL
7318 Dyukov	1969 OX	Dyukov	July 17, 1969	Nauchnij	B. A. Burnasheva	EUN	7.7 km (4.8 mi)	MPC · JPL
7319 Katterfeld	1976 SA_{6}	Katterfeld	September 24, 1976	Nauchnij	N. S. Chernykh	·	4.9 km (3.0 mi)	MPC · JPL
7320 Potter	1978 TP_{6}	Potter	October 2, 1978	Nauchnij	L. V. Zhuravleva	·	12 km (7.5 mi)	MPC · JPL
7321 Minervahoyt	1979 MZ_{2}	Minervahoyt	June 25, 1979	Siding Spring	E. F. Helin, S. J. Bus	·	5.2 km (3.2 mi)	MPC · JPL
7322 Lavrentina	1979 SW_{2}	Lavrentina	September 22, 1979	Nauchnij	N. S. Chernykh	·	15 km (9.3 mi)	MPC · JPL
7323 Robersomma	1979 SD_{9}	Robersomma	September 22, 1979	Nauchnij	N. S. Chernykh	·	13 km (8.1 mi)	MPC · JPL
7324 Carret	1981 BC	Carret	January 31, 1981	Harvard Observatory	Harvard Observatory	·	5.7 km (3.5 mi)	MPC · JPL
7325	1981 QA_{1}	—	August 28, 1981	Kleť	Z. Vávrová	·	6.5 km (4.0 mi)	MPC · JPL
7326 Tedbunch	1981 UK_{22}	Tedbunch	October 24, 1981	Palomar	S. J. Bus	·	4.5 km (2.8 mi)	MPC · JPL
7327 Crawford	1983 RZ_{1}	Crawford	September 6, 1983	Anderson Mesa	E. Bowell	·	3.7 km (2.3 mi)	MPC · JPL
7328 Casanova	1984 SC_{1}	Casanova	September 20, 1984	Kleť	A. Mrkos	EUN	5.8 km (3.6 mi)	MPC · JPL
7329 Bettadotto	1985 GK	Bettadotto	April 14, 1985	Anderson Mesa	E. Bowell	EUN	7.4 km (4.6 mi)	MPC · JPL
7330 Annelemaître	1985 TD	Annelemaître	October 15, 1985	Anderson Mesa	E. Bowell	·	4.3 km (2.7 mi)	MPC · JPL
7331 Balindblad	1985 TV	Balindblad	October 15, 1985	Anderson Mesa	E. Bowell	·	22 km (14 mi)	MPC · JPL
7332 Ponrepo	1986 XJ_{5}	Ponrepo	December 4, 1986	Kleť	A. Mrkos	·	3.6 km (2.2 mi)	MPC · JPL
7333 Bec-Borsenberger	1987 SM_{4}	Bec-Borsenberger	September 29, 1987	Anderson Mesa	E. Bowell	·	8.2 km (5.1 mi)	MPC · JPL
7334 Sciurus	1988 QV	Sciurus	August 17, 1988	Kleť	A. Mrkos	V	4.1 km (2.5 mi)	MPC · JPL
7335	1989 JA	—	May 1, 1989	Palomar	E. F. Helin	APO +1 km (0.62 mi) · PHA · moon	1.8 km (1.1 mi)	MPC · JPL
7336 Saunders	1989 RS_{1}	Saunders	September 6, 1989	Palomar	E. F. Helin	AMO	620 m (2,030 ft)	MPC · JPL
7337	1990 QH_{1}	—	August 22, 1990	Palomar	H. E. Holt	·	4.7 km (2.9 mi)	MPC · JPL
7338	1990 VJ_{3}	—	November 12, 1990	Fujieda	Shiozawa, H., M. Kizawa	EOS	11 km (6.8 mi)	MPC · JPL
7339	1991 RA_{16}	—	September 15, 1991	Palomar	H. E. Holt	·	11 km (6.8 mi)	MPC · JPL
7340	1991 UA_{2}	—	October 29, 1991	Kushiro	S. Ueda, H. Kaneda	KOR	5.6 km (3.5 mi)	MPC · JPL
7341	1991 VK	—	November 1, 1991	Palomar	E. F. Helin, K. J. Lawrence	APO +1 km (0.62 mi) · PHA	980 m (3,220 ft)	MPC · JPL
7342 Uchinoura	1992 FB_{1}	Uchinoura	March 23, 1992	Kitami	K. Endate, K. Watanabe	EUN	6.0 km (3.7 mi)	MPC · JPL
7343 Ockeghem	1992 GE_{2}	Ockeghem	April 4, 1992	La Silla	E. W. Elst	·	3.9 km (2.4 mi)	MPC · JPL
7344 Summerfield	1992 LU	Summerfield	June 4, 1992	Palomar	C. S. Shoemaker, D. H. Levy	EUN · moon	6.3 km (3.9 mi)	MPC · JPL
7345 Happer	1992 OF	Happer	July 28, 1992	Siding Spring	R. H. McNaught	(887)	4.4 km (2.7 mi)	MPC · JPL
7346 Boulanger	1993 DQ_{2}	Boulanger	February 20, 1993	Caussols	E. W. Elst	KOR	7.4 km (4.6 mi)	MPC · JPL
7347	1993 EW	—	March 12, 1993	Kushiro	S. Ueda, H. Kaneda	THM	13 km (8.1 mi)	MPC · JPL
7348	1993 FJ_{22}	—	March 21, 1993	La Silla	UESAC	THM	10 km (6.2 mi)	MPC · JPL
7349 Ernestmaes	1993 QK_{4}	Ernestmaes	August 18, 1993	Caussols	E. W. Elst	·	7.8 km (4.8 mi)	MPC · JPL
7350	1993 VA	—	November 7, 1993	Siding Spring	R. H. McNaught	APO +1 km (0.62 mi)	1.9 km (1.2 mi)	MPC · JPL
7351 Yoshidamichi	1993 XB_{1}	Yoshidamichi	December 12, 1993	Oizumi	T. Kobayashi	·	8.8 km (5.5 mi)	MPC · JPL
7352 Hypsenor	1994 CO	Hypsenor	February 4, 1994	Kushiro	S. Ueda, H. Kaneda	L5 · slow	48 km (30 mi)	MPC · JPL
7353 Kazuya	1995 AC_{1}	Kazuya	January 6, 1995	Nyukasa	M. Hirasawa, S. Suzuki	·	11 km (6.8 mi)	MPC · JPL
7354 Ishiguro	1995 BR_{1}	Ishiguro	January 27, 1995	Oizumi	T. Kobayashi	·	7.5 km (4.7 mi)	MPC · JPL
7355 Bottke	1995 HN_{2}	Bottke	April 25, 1995	Kitt Peak	Spacewatch	moon	5.1 km (3.2 mi)	MPC · JPL
7356 Casagrande	1995 SK_{5}	Casagrande	September 27, 1995	Stroncone	Santa Lucia	EUN	4.6 km (2.9 mi)	MPC · JPL
7357	1995 UJ_{7}	—	October 27, 1995	Kushiro	S. Ueda, H. Kaneda	·	4.0 km (2.5 mi)	MPC · JPL
7358 Oze	1995 YA_{3}	Oze	December 27, 1995	Oizumi	T. Kobayashi	AMO +1 km (0.62 mi) · slow	4.0 km (2.5 mi)	MPC · JPL
7359 Messier	1996 BH	Messier	January 16, 1996	Kleť	M. Tichý	·	12 km (7.5 mi)	MPC · JPL
7360 Moberg	1996 BQ_{17}	Moberg	January 30, 1996	La Silla	C.-I. Lagerkvist	·	6.0 km (3.7 mi)	MPC · JPL
7361 Endres	1996 DN_{1}	Endres	February 16, 1996	Haleakalā	NEAT	·	5.2 km (3.2 mi)	MPC · JPL
7362 Rogerbyrd	1996 EY	Rogerbyrd	March 15, 1996	Haleakalā	NEAT	NYS	5.5 km (3.4 mi)	MPC · JPL
7363 Esquibel	1996 FA_{1}	Esquibel	March 18, 1996	Haleakalā	NEAT	GEF ·	8.3 km (5.2 mi)	MPC · JPL
7364 Otonkučera	1996 KS	Otonkučera	May 22, 1996	Višnjan Observatory	K. Korlević	·	1.9 km (1.2 mi)	MPC · JPL
7365 Sejong	1996 QV_{1}	Sejong	August 18, 1996	JCPM Sapporo	K. Watanabe	·	5.3 km (3.3 mi)	MPC · JPL
7366 Agata	1996 UY	Agata	October 20, 1996	Oizumi	T. Kobayashi	HYG · slow	24 km (15 mi)	MPC · JPL
7367 Giotto	3077 T-1	Giotto	March 26, 1971	Palomar	C. J. van Houten, I. van Houten-Groeneveld, T. Gehrels	THM	7.8 km (4.8 mi)	MPC · JPL
7368 Haldancohn	1966 BB	Haldancohn	January 20, 1966	Brooklyn	Indiana University	·	4.5 km (2.8 mi)	MPC · JPL
7369 Gavrilin	1975 AN	Gavrilin	January 13, 1975	Nauchnij	T. M. Smirnova	moon	4.9 km (3.0 mi)	MPC · JPL
7370 Krasnogolovets	1978 SM_{5}	Krasnogolovets	September 27, 1978	Nauchnij	L. I. Chernykh	·	7.7 km (4.8 mi)	MPC · JPL
7371 El-Baz	1978 VA_{6}	El-Baz	November 7, 1978	Palomar	E. F. Helin, S. J. Bus	THM	9.2 km (5.7 mi)	MPC · JPL
7372 Emimar	1979 HH	Emimar	April 19, 1979	Cerro Tololo	Muzzio, J. C.	KOR	9.3 km (5.8 mi)	MPC · JPL
7373 Stashis	1979 QX_{9}	Stashis	August 27, 1979	Nauchnij	N. S. Chernykh	THM	9.9 km (6.2 mi)	MPC · JPL
7374	1980 DL	—	February 19, 1980	Kleť	Z. Vávrová	·	2.7 km (1.7 mi)	MPC · JPL
7375	1980 PZ	—	August 14, 1980	Kleť	Z. Vávrová	·	4.9 km (3.0 mi)	MPC · JPL
7376 Jefftaylor	1980 UU_{1}	Jefftaylor	October 31, 1980	Palomar	S. J. Bus	NYS	5.4 km (3.4 mi)	MPC · JPL
7377 Pizzarello	1981 EW_{9}	Pizzarello	March 1, 1981	Siding Spring	S. J. Bus	·	2.2 km (1.4 mi)	MPC · JPL
7378 Herbertpalme	1981 EK_{18}	Herbertpalme	March 2, 1981	Siding Spring	S. J. Bus	THM	15 km (9.3 mi)	MPC · JPL
7379 Naoyaimae	1981 EC_{29}	Naoyaimae	March 1, 1981	Siding Spring	S. J. Bus	·	3.3 km (2.1 mi)	MPC · JPL
7380	1981 RF	—	September 3, 1981	Anderson Mesa	N. G. Thomas	NYS ·	9.1 km (5.7 mi)	MPC · JPL
7381 Mamontov	1981 RG_{5}	Mamontov	September 8, 1981	Nauchnij	L. V. Zhuravleva	V	4.1 km (2.5 mi)	MPC · JPL
7382 Bozhenkova	1981 RJ_{5}	Bozhenkova	September 8, 1981	Nauchnij	L. V. Zhuravleva	(3460)	13 km (8.1 mi)	MPC · JPL
7383 Lassovszky	1981 SE	Lassovszky	September 30, 1981	Harvard Observatory	Oak Ridge Observatory	·	7.7 km (4.8 mi)	MPC · JPL
7384	1981 TJ	—	October 6, 1981	Kleť	Z. Vávrová	·	15 km (9.3 mi)	MPC · JPL
7385 Aktsynovia	1981 UQ_{11}	Aktsynovia	October 22, 1981	Nauchnij	N. S. Chernykh	·	8.9 km (5.5 mi)	MPC · JPL
7386 Paulpellas	1981 WM	Paulpellas	November 25, 1981	Harvard Observatory	Oak Ridge Observatory	·	5.0 km (3.1 mi)	MPC · JPL
7387 Malbil	1982 BS_{1}	Malbil	January 30, 1982	Anderson Mesa	E. Bowell	·	8.8 km (5.5 mi)	MPC · JPL
7388 Marcomorelli	1982 FS_{3}	Marcomorelli	March 23, 1982	La Silla	H. Debehogne	·	16 km (9.9 mi)	MPC · JPL
7389 Michelcombes	1982 UE	Michelcombes	October 17, 1982	Anderson Mesa	E. Bowell	·	4.0 km (2.5 mi)	MPC · JPL
7390 Kundera	1983 QE	Kundera	August 31, 1983	Kleť	Kleť	EUN	5.6 km (3.5 mi)	MPC · JPL
7391 Strouhal	1983 VS_{1}	Strouhal	November 8, 1983	Kleť	A. Mrkos	·	6.1 km (3.8 mi)	MPC · JPL
7392 Kowalski	1984 EX	Kowalski	March 6, 1984	Anderson Mesa	E. Bowell	·	10 km (6.2 mi)	MPC · JPL
7393 Luginbuhl	1984 SL_{3}	Luginbuhl	September 28, 1984	Anderson Mesa	B. A. Skiff	moon	5.5 km (3.4 mi)	MPC · JPL
7394 Xanthomalitia	1985 QX_{4}	Xanthomalitia	August 18, 1985	Nauchnij	N. S. Chernykh	3:2	32 km (20 mi)	MPC · JPL
7395	1985 RP_{1}	—	September 10, 1985	Kleť	Z. Vávrová	·	3.6 km (2.2 mi)	MPC · JPL
7396 Rosa-Brusin	1986 EQ_{2}	Rosa-Brusin	March 4, 1986	La Silla	W. Ferreri	KOR	7.6 km (4.7 mi)	MPC · JPL
7397	1986 QS	—	August 26, 1986	La Silla	H. Debehogne	GEF	7.2 km (4.5 mi)	MPC · JPL
7398 Walsh	1986 VM	Walsh	November 3, 1986	Kleť	A. Mrkos	·	3.4 km (2.1 mi)	MPC · JPL
7399 Somme	1987 BC_{2}	Somme	January 29, 1987	La Silla	E. W. Elst	·	4.7 km (2.9 mi)	MPC · JPL
7400 Lenau	1987 QW_{1}	Lenau	August 21, 1987	La Silla	E. W. Elst	·	6.3 km (3.9 mi)	MPC · JPL

== 7401–7500 ==
back to top

Designation			Discovery			Properties		Ref
Permanent	Provisional	Named after	Date	Site	Discoverer(s)	Category	Diam.	Ref
7401 Toynbee	1987 QW_{7}	Toynbee	August 21, 1987	La Silla	E. W. Elst	NYS ·	7.8 km (4.8 mi)	MPC · JPL
7402	1987 YH	—	December 25, 1987	Chiyoda	T. Kojima	DOR	13 km (8.1 mi)	MPC · JPL
7403 Choustník	1988 AV_{1}	Choustník	January 14, 1988	Kleť	A. Mrkos	·	8.0 km (5.0 mi)	MPC · JPL
7404	1988 AA_{5}	—	January 13, 1988	La Silla	H. Debehogne	·	11 km (6.8 mi)	MPC · JPL
7405	1988 FF	—	March 16, 1988	Kushiro	S. Ueda, H. Kaneda	DOR	14 km (8.7 mi)	MPC · JPL
7406	1988 TD	—	October 3, 1988	Kushiro	S. Ueda, H. Kaneda	NYS	7.2 km (4.5 mi)	MPC · JPL
7407	1988 TL	—	October 3, 1988	Kushiro	S. Ueda, H. Kaneda	NYS	5.6 km (3.5 mi)	MPC · JPL
7408 Yoshihide	1989 SB	Yoshihide	September 23, 1989	Kani	Y. Mizuno, T. Furuta	·	4.2 km (2.6 mi)	MPC · JPL
7409	1990 BS	—	January 21, 1990	Yorii	M. Arai, H. Mori	NYS	4.3 km (2.7 mi)	MPC · JPL
7410 Kawazoe	1990 QG	Kawazoe	August 20, 1990	Geisei	T. Seki	·	12 km (7.5 mi)	MPC · JPL
7411	1990 QQ_{1}	—	August 22, 1990	Palomar	H. E. Holt	TIR ·	19 km (12 mi)	MPC · JPL
7412 Linnaeus	1990 SL_{9}	Linnaeus	September 22, 1990	La Silla	E. W. Elst	THM	12 km (7.5 mi)	MPC · JPL
7413 Galibina	1990 SH_{28}	Galibina	September 24, 1990	Nauchnij	L. V. Zhuravleva, G. R. Kastelʹ	·	12 km (7.5 mi)	MPC · JPL
7414 Bosch	1990 TD_{8}	Bosch	October 13, 1990	Tautenburg Observatory	L. D. Schmadel, F. Börngen	·	11 km (6.8 mi)	MPC · JPL
7415 Susumuimoto	1990 VL_{8}	Susumuimoto	November 14, 1990	Geisei	T. Seki	THM	13 km (8.1 mi)	MPC · JPL
7416 Linnankoski	1990 WV_{4}	Linnankoski	November 16, 1990	La Silla	E. W. Elst	·	2.5 km (1.6 mi)	MPC · JPL
7417	1990 YE	—	December 19, 1990	Yorii	M. Arai, H. Mori	·	12 km (7.5 mi)	MPC · JPL
7418 Akasegawa	1991 EJ_{1}	Akasegawa	March 11, 1991	Kitami	T. Fujii, K. Watanabe	V	3.8 km (2.4 mi)	MPC · JPL
7419	1991 PN_{13}	—	August 5, 1991	Palomar	H. E. Holt	EUN	8.7 km (5.4 mi)	MPC · JPL
7420 Buffon	1991 RP_{11}	Buffon	September 4, 1991	La Silla	E. W. Elst	·	6.3 km (3.9 mi)	MPC · JPL
7421 Kusaka	1992 HL	Kusaka	April 30, 1992	Yatsugatake	Y. Kushida, O. Muramatsu	·	5.7 km (3.5 mi)	MPC · JPL
7422	1992 LP	—	June 3, 1992	Palomar	G. J. Leonard	·	4.1 km (2.5 mi)	MPC · JPL
7423	1992 PT_{2}	—	August 2, 1992	Palomar	H. E. Holt	·	3.9 km (2.4 mi)	MPC · JPL
7424	1992 PS_{6}	—	August 6, 1992	Palomar	H. E. Holt	V	4.1 km (2.5 mi)	MPC · JPL
7425 Lessing	1992 RO_{5}	Lessing	September 2, 1992	La Silla	E. W. Elst	NYS	6.0 km (3.7 mi)	MPC · JPL
7426	1992 US_{4}	—	October 27, 1992	Dynic	A. Sugie	NYS	5.7 km (3.5 mi)	MPC · JPL
7427	1992 VD	—	November 2, 1992	Uenohara	N. Kawasato	·	6.1 km (3.8 mi)	MPC · JPL
7428 Abekuniomi	1992 YM	Abekuniomi	December 24, 1992	Oohira	T. Urata	EUN	5.2 km (3.2 mi)	MPC · JPL
7429 Hoshikawa	1992 YB_{1}	Hoshikawa	December 24, 1992	Okutama	Hioki, T., Hayakawa, S.	·	7.8 km (4.8 mi)	MPC · JPL
7430 Kogure	1993 BV_{2}	Kogure	January 23, 1993	Kitami	K. Endate, K. Watanabe	(5) · slow	8.1 km (5.0 mi)	MPC · JPL
7431 Jettaguilar	1993 FN_{41}	Jettaguilar	March 19, 1993	La Silla	UESAC	·	7.8 km (4.8 mi)	MPC · JPL
7432	1993 HL_{5}	—	April 23, 1993	Lake Tekapo	A. C. Gilmore, P. M. Kilmartin	THM	12 km (7.5 mi)	MPC · JPL
7433 Pellegrini	1993 KD	Pellegrini	May 21, 1993	Farra d'Isonzo	Farra d'Isonzo	·	3.5 km (2.2 mi)	MPC · JPL
7434 Osaka	1994 AB_{3}	Osaka	January 14, 1994	Oizumi	T. Kobayashi	·	4.7 km (2.9 mi)	MPC · JPL
7435 Sagamihara	1994 CZ_{1}	Sagamihara	February 8, 1994	Kitami	K. Endate, K. Watanabe	·	4.8 km (3.0 mi)	MPC · JPL
7436 Kuroiwa	1994 CB_{2}	Kuroiwa	February 8, 1994	Kitami	K. Endate, K. Watanabe	·	4.6 km (2.9 mi)	MPC · JPL
7437 Torricelli	1994 EF_{3}	Torricelli	March 12, 1994	Cima Ekar	V. Goretti, A. Boattini	·	3.5 km (2.2 mi)	MPC · JPL
7438 Misakatouge	1994 JE_{1}	Misakatouge	May 12, 1994	Kuma Kogen	A. Nakamura	·	4.3 km (2.7 mi)	MPC · JPL
7439 Tetsufuse	1994 XG_{1}	Tetsufuse	December 6, 1994	Oizumi	T. Kobayashi	·	5.7 km (3.5 mi)	MPC · JPL
7440 Závist	1995 EA	Závist	March 1, 1995	Kleť	M. Tichý	·	5.1 km (3.2 mi)	MPC · JPL
7441 Láska	1995 OZ	Láska	July 30, 1995	Kleť	J. Tichá, M. Tichý	·	3.2 km (2.0 mi)	MPC · JPL
7442 Inouehideo	1995 SC_{5}	Inouehideo	September 20, 1995	Kitami	K. Endate, K. Watanabe	THM	11 km (6.8 mi)	MPC · JPL
7443 Tsumura	1996 BR_{2}	Tsumura	January 26, 1996	Oizumi	T. Kobayashi	KOR	6.9 km (4.3 mi)	MPC · JPL
7444	1996 TM_{10}	—	October 9, 1996	Kushiro	S. Ueda, H. Kaneda	GEF	6.3 km (3.9 mi)	MPC · JPL
7445 Trajanus	4116 P-L	Trajanus	September 24, 1960	Palomar	C. J. van Houten, I. van Houten-Groeneveld, T. Gehrels	·	3.0 km (1.9 mi)	MPC · JPL
7446 Hadrianus	2249 T-2	Hadrianus	September 29, 1973	Palomar	C. J. van Houten, I. van Houten-Groeneveld, T. Gehrels	·	20 km (12 mi)	MPC · JPL
7447 Marcusaurelius	1142 T-3	Marcusaurelius	October 17, 1977	Palomar	C. J. van Houten, I. van Houten-Groeneveld, T. Gehrels	·	5.0 km (3.1 mi)	MPC · JPL
7448 Pöllath	1948 AA	Pöllath	January 14, 1948	Mount Wilson	W. Baade	PHO	3.8 km (2.4 mi)	MPC · JPL
7449 Döllen	1949 QL	Döllen	August 21, 1949	Heidelberg	K. Reinmuth	·	3.4 km (2.1 mi)	MPC · JPL
7450 Shilling	1968 OZ	Shilling	July 24, 1968	Cerro El Roble	Plyugin, G. A., Yu. A. Belyaev	slow	14 km (8.7 mi)	MPC · JPL
7451 Verbitskaya	1978 PU_{2}	Verbitskaya	August 8, 1978	Nauchnij	N. S. Chernykh	GEF	7.6 km (4.7 mi)	MPC · JPL
7452 Izabelyuria	1978 QU_{2}	Izabelyuria	August 31, 1978	Nauchnij	N. S. Chernykh	THM	10 km (6.2 mi)	MPC · JPL
7453 Slovtsov	1978 RV_{1}	Slovtsov	September 5, 1978	Nauchnij	N. S. Chernykh	·	5.2 km (3.2 mi)	MPC · JPL
7454 Kevinrighter	1981 EW_{20}	Kevinrighter	March 2, 1981	Siding Spring	S. J. Bus	THM	12 km (7.5 mi)	MPC · JPL
7455 Podosek	1981 EQ_{26}	Podosek	March 2, 1981	Siding Spring	S. J. Bus	KOR	4.8 km (3.0 mi)	MPC · JPL
7456 Doressoundiram	1982 OD	Doressoundiram	July 17, 1982	Anderson Mesa	E. Bowell	·	8.6 km (5.3 mi)	MPC · JPL
7457 Veselov	1982 SL_{6}	Veselov	September 16, 1982	Nauchnij	L. I. Chernykh	PAD	11 km (6.8 mi)	MPC · JPL
7458	1984 DE_{1}	—	February 28, 1984	La Silla	H. Debehogne	3:2	25 km (16 mi)	MPC · JPL
7459 Gilbertofranco	1984 HR_{1}	Gilbertofranco	April 28, 1984	La Silla	V. Zappalà	·	5.4 km (3.4 mi)	MPC · JPL
7460 Julienicoles	1984 JN	Julienicoles	May 9, 1984	Palomar	Gibson, J.	·	4.4 km (2.7 mi)	MPC · JPL
7461 Kachmokiam	1984 TD	Kachmokiam	October 3, 1984	Harvard Observatory	Oak Ridge Observatory	THM	12 km (7.5 mi)	MPC · JPL
7462 Grenoble	1984 WM_{1}	Grenoble	November 20, 1984	Anderson Mesa	E. Bowell	(2076)	5.3 km (3.3 mi)	MPC · JPL
7463 Oukawamine	1985 SB	Oukawamine	September 20, 1985	Geisei	T. Seki	·	6.1 km (3.8 mi)	MPC · JPL
7464 Vipera	1987 VB_{1}	Vipera	November 15, 1987	Kleť	A. Mrkos	·	4.5 km (2.8 mi)	MPC · JPL
7465 Munkanber	1989 UA_{3}	Munkanber	October 31, 1989	Stakenbridge	B. G. W. Manning	·	2.3 km (1.4 mi)	MPC · JPL
7466	1989 VC_{2}	—	November 2, 1989	Okutama	Hioki, T., N. Kawasato	CYB	24 km (15 mi)	MPC · JPL
7467	1989 WQ_{1}	—	November 25, 1989	Kushiro	S. Ueda, H. Kaneda	·	1.8 km (1.1 mi)	MPC · JPL
7468 Anfimov	1990 UP_{11}	Anfimov	October 17, 1990	Nauchnij	L. I. Chernykh	ANF	10 km (6.2 mi)	MPC · JPL
7469 Krikalev	1990 VU_{14}	Krikalev	November 15, 1990	Nauchnij	L. I. Chernykh	slow	13 km (8.1 mi)	MPC · JPL
7470 Jabberwock	1991 JA	Jabberwock	May 2, 1991	Oohira	T. Urata	V	2.9 km (1.8 mi)	MPC · JPL
7471	1991 YD	—	December 28, 1991	Uenohara	N. Kawasato	·	6.0 km (3.7 mi)	MPC · JPL
7472 Kumakiri	1992 CU	Kumakiri	February 13, 1992	Susono	M. Akiyama, T. Furuta	·	10 km (6.2 mi)	MPC · JPL
7473	1992 EC_{4}	—	March 1, 1992	La Silla	UESAC	KOR	6.6 km (4.1 mi)	MPC · JPL
7474	1992 TC	—	October 1, 1992	Siding Spring	R. H. McNaught	AMO +1 km (0.62 mi)	850 m (2,790 ft)	MPC · JPL
7475 Kaizuka	1992 UX_{5}	Kaizuka	October 28, 1992	Kitami	K. Endate, K. Watanabe	·	4.2 km (2.6 mi)	MPC · JPL
7476 Ogilsbie	1993 GE	Ogilsbie	April 14, 1993	Catalina	T. B. Spahr	·	18 km (11 mi)	MPC · JPL
7477 Conversiluca	1993 LC	Conversiluca	June 13, 1993	Palomar	H. E. Holt	EUN	6.8 km (4.2 mi)	MPC · JPL
7478 Hasse	1993 OA_{4}	Hasse	July 20, 1993	La Silla	E. W. Elst	KOR	4.5 km (2.8 mi)	MPC · JPL
7479	1994 EC_{1}	—	March 4, 1994	Kushiro	S. Ueda, H. Kaneda	(2076)	4.0 km (2.5 mi)	MPC · JPL
7480 Norwan	1994 PC	Norwan	August 1, 1994	Palomar	C. S. Shoemaker, E. M. Shoemaker	AMO +1 km (0.62 mi)	1.3 km (0.81 mi)	MPC · JPL
7481 San Marcello	1994 PA_{1}	San Marcello	August 11, 1994	San Marcello	A. Boattini, M. Tombelli	fast?	11 km (6.8 mi)	MPC · JPL
7482	1994 PC_{1}	—	August 9, 1994	Siding Spring	R. H. McNaught	APO +1 km (0.62 mi) · PHA	1.1 km (0.68 mi)	MPC · JPL
7483 Sekitakakazu	1994 VO_{2}	Sekitakakazu	November 1, 1994	Kitami	K. Endate, K. Watanabe	·	18 km (11 mi)	MPC · JPL
7484 Dogo Onsen	1994 WF_{4}	Dogo Onsen	November 30, 1994	Kuma Kogen	A. Nakamura	·	4.0 km (2.5 mi)	MPC · JPL
7485 Changchun	1994 XO	Changchun	December 4, 1994	Ayashi Station	M. Koishikawa	·	11 km (6.8 mi)	MPC · JPL
7486 Hamabe	1994 XJ_{1}	Hamabe	December 6, 1994	Oizumi	T. Kobayashi	·	3.3 km (2.1 mi)	MPC · JPL
7487 Toshitanaka	1994 YM	Toshitanaka	December 28, 1994	Oizumi	T. Kobayashi	EUN	8.1 km (5.0 mi)	MPC · JPL
7488 Robertpaul	1995 KB_{1}	Robertpaul	May 27, 1995	Catalina Station	C. W. Hergenrother	H	2.5 km (1.6 mi)	MPC · JPL
7489 Oribe	1995 MX	Oribe	June 26, 1995	Catalina Station	C. W. Hergenrother	slow	10 km (6.2 mi)	MPC · JPL
7490 Babička	1995 OF_{1}	Babička	July 31, 1995	Ondřejov	P. Pravec	·	2.4 km (1.5 mi)	MPC · JPL
7491 Linzerag	1995 SD_{2}	Linzerag	September 23, 1995	Bologna	San Vittore	·	13 km (8.1 mi)	MPC · JPL
7492 Kačenka	1995 UX	Kačenka	October 21, 1995	Ondřejov	P. Pravec	NYS	3.3 km (2.1 mi)	MPC · JPL
7493 Hirzo	1995 US_{2}	Hirzo	October 24, 1995	Kleť	J. Tichá	·	5.8 km (3.6 mi)	MPC · JPL
7494 Xiwanggongcheng	1995 UV_{48}	Xiwanggongcheng	October 28, 1995	Xinglong	SCAP	EOS	10 km (6.2 mi)	MPC · JPL
7495 Feynman	1995 WS_{4}	Feynman	November 22, 1995	Kleť	M. Tichý, Z. Moravec	·	7.1 km (4.4 mi)	MPC · JPL
7496 Miroslavholub	1995 WN_{6}	Miroslavholub	November 27, 1995	Kleť	M. Tichý	·	21 km (13 mi)	MPC · JPL
7497 Guangcaishiye	1995 YY_{21}	Guangcaishiye	December 17, 1995	Xinglong	SCAP	NYS	5.0 km (3.1 mi)	MPC · JPL
7498 Blaník	1996 BF	Blaník	January 16, 1996	Kleť	Z. Moravec	·	17 km (11 mi)	MPC · JPL
7499 L'Aquila	1996 OO_{2}	L'Aquila	July 24, 1996	Campo Imperatore	A. Boattini, A. Di Paola	·	12 km (7.5 mi)	MPC · JPL
7500 Sassi	1996 TN	Sassi	October 3, 1996	Farra d'Isonzo	Farra d'Isonzo	moon	5.1 km (3.2 mi)	MPC · JPL

== 7501–7600 ==
back to top

Designation			Discovery			Properties		Ref
Permanent	Provisional	Named after	Date	Site	Discoverer(s)	Category	Diam.	Ref
7501 Farra	1996 VD_{3}	Farra	November 9, 1996	Farra d'Isonzo	Farra d'Isonzo	CYB	20 km (12 mi)	MPC · JPL
7502 Arakida	1996 VP_{7}	Arakida	November 15, 1996	Nachi-Katsuura	Y. Shimizu, T. Urata	KOR	6.9 km (4.3 mi)	MPC · JPL
7503	1996 VJ_{38}	—	November 7, 1996	Kushiro	S. Ueda, H. Kaneda	·	3.2 km (2.0 mi)	MPC · JPL
7504 Kawakita	1997 AF_{1}	Kawakita	January 2, 1997	Oizumi	T. Kobayashi	(3460)	10 km (6.2 mi)	MPC · JPL
7505 Furusho	1997 AM_{2}	Furusho	January 3, 1997	Oizumi	T. Kobayashi	·	9.1 km (5.7 mi)	MPC · JPL
7506 Lub	4837 P-L	Lub	September 24, 1960	Palomar	C. J. van Houten, I. van Houten-Groeneveld, T. Gehrels	THM	8.3 km (5.2 mi)	MPC · JPL
7507 Israel	7063 P-L	Israel	October 17, 1960	Palomar	C. J. van Houten, I. van Houten-Groeneveld, T. Gehrels	·	4.5 km (2.8 mi)	MPC · JPL
7508 Icke	2327 T-3	Icke	October 16, 1977	Palomar	C. J. van Houten, I. van Houten-Groeneveld, T. Gehrels	AGN	4.2 km (2.6 mi)	MPC · JPL
7509 Gamzatov	1977 EL	Gamzatov	March 9, 1977	Nauchnij	N. S. Chernykh	(883) · slow	3.9 km (2.4 mi)	MPC · JPL
7510	1978 UF_{6}	—	October 27, 1978	Palomar	C. M. Olmstead	·	3.4 km (2.1 mi)	MPC · JPL
7511 Patcassen	1981 EX_{24}	Patcassen	March 2, 1981	Siding Spring	S. J. Bus	THM	7.3 km (4.5 mi)	MPC · JPL
7512 Monicalazzarin	1983 CA_{1}	Monicalazzarin	February 15, 1983	Anderson Mesa	E. Bowell	DOR	14 km (8.7 mi)	MPC · JPL
7513	1985 RU_{2}	—	September 5, 1985	La Silla	H. Debehogne	·	2.4 km (1.5 mi)	MPC · JPL
7514	1986 ED	—	March 7, 1986	Kobuchizawa	Inoue, M., O. Muramatsu, T. Urata	·	7.3 km (4.5 mi)	MPC · JPL
7515 Marrucino	1986 EF_{5}	Marrucino	March 5, 1986	La Silla	G. de Sanctis	·	7.0 km (4.3 mi)	MPC · JPL
7516 Kranjc	1987 MC	Kranjc	June 18, 1987	Bologna	San Vittore	·	6.0 km (3.7 mi)	MPC · JPL
7517 Alisondoane	1989 AD	Alisondoane	January 3, 1989	Chiyoda	T. Kojima	·	9.1 km (5.7 mi)	MPC · JPL
7518	1989 FG	—	March 29, 1989	Toyota	K. Suzuki, T. Furuta	(5)	7.5 km (4.7 mi)	MPC · JPL
7519 Paulcook	1989 UN_{3}	Paulcook	October 31, 1989	Stakenbridge	B. G. W. Manning	THM	10 km (6.2 mi)	MPC · JPL
7520	1990 BV	—	January 21, 1990	Okutama	Hioki, T., Hayakawa, S.	·	9.9 km (6.2 mi)	MPC · JPL
7521 Wylezalek	1990 QS_{2}	Wylezalek	August 24, 1990	Palomar	H. E. Holt	KOR ·	7.6 km (4.7 mi)	MPC · JPL
7522	1991 AJ	—	January 9, 1991	Yorii	M. Arai, H. Mori	·	14 km (8.7 mi)	MPC · JPL
7523	1991 PF_{18}	—	August 8, 1991	Palomar	H. E. Holt	·	5.6 km (3.5 mi)	MPC · JPL
7524	1991 RW_{19}	—	September 14, 1991	Palomar	H. E. Holt	·	5.4 km (3.4 mi)	MPC · JPL
7525 Kiyohira	1992 YE	Kiyohira	December 18, 1992	Yakiimo	Natori, A., T. Urata	·	3.4 km (2.1 mi)	MPC · JPL
7526 Ohtsuka	1993 AA	Ohtsuka	January 2, 1993	Oohira	T. Urata	·	7.7 km (4.8 mi)	MPC · JPL
7527 Marples	1993 BJ	Marples	January 20, 1993	Oohira	T. Urata	·	4.4 km (2.7 mi)	MPC · JPL
7528 Huskvarna	1993 FS_{39}	Huskvarna	March 19, 1993	La Silla	UESAC	KOR	6.9 km (4.3 mi)	MPC · JPL
7529 Vagnozzi	1994 BC	Vagnozzi	January 16, 1994	Colleverde	Colleverde	·	4.9 km (3.0 mi)	MPC · JPL
7530 Mizusawa	1994 GO_{1}	Mizusawa	April 15, 1994	Kitami	K. Endate, K. Watanabe	·	8.0 km (5.0 mi)	MPC · JPL
7531 Pecorelli	1994 SC	Pecorelli	September 24, 1994	Stroncone	Santa Lucia	·	4.4 km (2.7 mi)	MPC · JPL
7532 Pelhřimov	1995 UR_{1}	Pelhřimov	October 22, 1995	Kleť	M. Tichý	·	4.7 km (2.9 mi)	MPC · JPL
7533 Seiraiji	1995 UE_{6}	Seiraiji	October 25, 1995	Nachi-Katsuura	Y. Shimizu, T. Urata	·	12 km (7.5 mi)	MPC · JPL
7534	1995 UA_{7}	—	October 26, 1995	Nachi-Katsuura	Y. Shimizu, T. Urata	·	5.2 km (3.2 mi)	MPC · JPL
7535	1995 WU_{2}	—	November 16, 1995	Kushiro	S. Ueda, H. Kaneda	·	15 km (9.3 mi)	MPC · JPL
7536 Fahrenheit	1995 WB_{7}	Fahrenheit	November 21, 1995	Nachi-Katsuura	Y. Shimizu, T. Urata	·	24 km (15 mi)	MPC · JPL
7537 Solvay	1996 HS_{8}	Solvay	April 17, 1996	La Silla	E. W. Elst	·	10 km (6.2 mi)	MPC · JPL
7538 Zenbei	1996 VE_{6}	Zenbei	November 15, 1996	Oizumi	T. Kobayashi	NYS	4.1 km (2.5 mi)	MPC · JPL
7539	1996 XS_{32}	—	December 6, 1996	Kushiro	S. Ueda, H. Kaneda	·	4.9 km (3.0 mi)	MPC · JPL
7540	1997 AK_{21}	—	January 9, 1997	Kushiro	S. Ueda, H. Kaneda	V	5.7 km (3.5 mi)	MPC · JPL
7541 Nieuwenhuis	4019 T-3	Nieuwenhuis	October 16, 1977	Palomar	C. J. van Houten, I. van Houten-Groeneveld, T. Gehrels	·	5.9 km (3.7 mi)	MPC · JPL
7542 Johnpond	1953 GN	Johnpond	April 7, 1953	Heidelberg	K. Reinmuth	·	4.0 km (2.5 mi)	MPC · JPL
7543 Prylis	1973 SY	Prylis	September 19, 1973	Palomar	C. J. van Houten, I. van Houten-Groeneveld, T. Gehrels	L4	43 km (27 mi)	MPC · JPL
7544 Tipografiyanauka	1976 UB_{2}	Tipografiyanauka	October 26, 1976	Nauchnij	T. M. Smirnova	KOR	8.3 km (5.2 mi)	MPC · JPL
7545 Smaklösa	1978 OB	Smaklösa	July 28, 1978	Mount Stromlo	C.-I. Lagerkvist	·	4.1 km (2.5 mi)	MPC · JPL
7546 Meriam	1979 MB_{4}	Meriam	June 25, 1979	Siding Spring	E. F. Helin, S. J. Bus	·	2.0 km (1.2 mi)	MPC · JPL
7547 Martinnakata	1979 MO_{4}	Martinnakata	June 25, 1979	Siding Spring	E. F. Helin, S. J. Bus	·	3.3 km (2.1 mi)	MPC · JPL
7548 Engström	1980 FW_{2}	Engström	March 16, 1980	La Silla	C.-I. Lagerkvist	THM	11 km (6.8 mi)	MPC · JPL
7549 Woodard	1980 TO_{5}	Woodard	October 9, 1980	Palomar	C. S. Shoemaker, E. M. Shoemaker	EOS	8.6 km (5.3 mi)	MPC · JPL
7550 Woolum	1981 EV_{8}	Woolum	March 1, 1981	Siding Spring	S. J. Bus	·	3.1 km (1.9 mi)	MPC · JPL
7551 Edstolper	1981 EF_{26}	Edstolper	March 2, 1981	Siding Spring	S. J. Bus	·	20 km (12 mi)	MPC · JPL
7552 Sephton	1981 EB_{27}	Sephton	March 2, 1981	Siding Spring	S. J. Bus	(5)	2.7 km (1.7 mi)	MPC · JPL
7553 Buie	1981 FG	Buie	March 30, 1981	Anderson Mesa	E. Bowell	NYS	3.4 km (2.1 mi)	MPC · JPL
7554 Johnspencer	1981 GQ	Johnspencer	April 5, 1981	Anderson Mesa	E. Bowell	·	16 km (9.9 mi)	MPC · JPL
7555 Venvolkov	1981 SZ_{6}	Venvolkov	September 28, 1981	Nauchnij	L. V. Zhuravleva	·	3.2 km (2.0 mi)	MPC · JPL
7556 Perinaldo	1982 FX_{2}	Perinaldo	March 18, 1982	La Silla	H. Debehogne	·	9.6 km (6.0 mi)	MPC · JPL
7557	1982 FK_{3}	—	March 21, 1982	La Silla	H. Debehogne	·	7.7 km (4.8 mi)	MPC · JPL
7558 Yurlov	1982 TB_{2}	Yurlov	October 14, 1982	Nauchnij	L. G. Karachkina	·	5.9 km (3.7 mi)	MPC · JPL
7559 Kirstinemeyer	1985 VF	Kirstinemeyer	November 14, 1985	Brorfelde	P. Jensen	·	7.1 km (4.4 mi)	MPC · JPL
7560 Spudis	1986 AJ	Spudis	January 10, 1986	Palomar	C. S. Shoemaker, E. M. Shoemaker	H	3.1 km (1.9 mi)	MPC · JPL
7561 Patrickmichel	1986 TR_{2}	Patrickmichel	October 7, 1986	Anderson Mesa	E. Bowell	·	10 km (6.2 mi)	MPC · JPL
7562 Kagiroino-Oka	1986 WO_{9}	Kagiroino-Oka	November 30, 1986	Kiso	H. Kosai, K. Furukawa	·	6.9 km (4.3 mi)	MPC · JPL
7563	1988 BC	—	January 16, 1988	Chiyoda	T. Kojima	·	16 km (9.9 mi)	MPC · JPL
7564 Gokumenon	1988 CA	Gokumenon	February 7, 1988	Kavalur	Rajamohan, R.	·	8.5 km (5.3 mi)	MPC · JPL
7565 Zipfel	1988 RD_{11}	Zipfel	September 14, 1988	Cerro Tololo	S. J. Bus	·	10 km (6.2 mi)	MPC · JPL
7566	1988 SP	—	September 18, 1988	La Silla	H. Debehogne	·	3.5 km (2.2 mi)	MPC · JPL
7567	1988 TC_{1}	—	October 13, 1988	Kushiro	S. Ueda, H. Kaneda	slow	4.3 km (2.7 mi)	MPC · JPL
7568	1988 VJ_{2}	—	November 7, 1988	Okutama	Hioki, T., N. Kawasato	(887)	2.7 km (1.7 mi)	MPC · JPL
7569	1989 BK	—	January 28, 1989	Gekko	Y. Oshima	(887)	7.6 km (4.7 mi)	MPC · JPL
7570	1989 CP	—	February 5, 1989	Yorii	M. Arai, H. Mori	NYS	4.9 km (3.0 mi)	MPC · JPL
7571 Weisse Rose	1989 EH_{6}	Weisse Rose	March 7, 1989	Tautenburg Observatory	F. Börngen	THM	15 km (9.3 mi)	MPC · JPL
7572 Znokai	1989 SF	Znokai	September 23, 1989	Kitami	K. Endate, K. Watanabe	·	4.7 km (2.9 mi)	MPC · JPL
7573 Basfifty	1989 VX	Basfifty	November 4, 1989	Stakenbridge	B. G. W. Manning	THM	10 km (6.2 mi)	MPC · JPL
7574	1989 WO_{1}	—	November 20, 1989	Oohira	Kakei, W., M. Kizawa, T. Urata	CYB	24 km (15 mi)	MPC · JPL
7575 Kimuraseiji	1989 YK	Kimuraseiji	December 22, 1989	Yatsugatake	Y. Kushida, O. Muramatsu	·	5.1 km (3.2 mi)	MPC · JPL
7576	1990 BN	—	January 21, 1990	Yorii	M. Arai, H. Mori	GEF	6.9 km (4.3 mi)	MPC · JPL
7577	1990 QV_{4}	—	August 24, 1990	Palomar	H. E. Holt	EOS	9.8 km (6.1 mi)	MPC · JPL
7578 Georgböhm	1990 SP_{7}	Georgböhm	September 22, 1990	La Silla	E. W. Elst	·	10 km (6.2 mi)	MPC · JPL
7579	1990 TN_{1}	—	October 14, 1990	Palomar	E. F. Helin	H ·	3.5 km (2.2 mi)	MPC · JPL
7580 Schwabhausen	1990 TM_{7}	Schwabhausen	October 13, 1990	Tautenburg Observatory	F. Börngen, L. D. Schmadel	·	6.3 km (3.9 mi)	MPC · JPL
7581 Yudovich	1990 VY_{13}	Yudovich	November 14, 1990	Nauchnij	L. G. Karachkina	·	20 km (12 mi)	MPC · JPL
7582	1990 WL	—	November 20, 1990	Siding Spring	R. H. McNaught	slow	13 km (8.1 mi)	MPC · JPL
7583 Rosegger	1991 BA_{3}	Rosegger	January 17, 1991	Tautenburg Observatory	F. Börngen	EOS	8.4 km (5.2 mi)	MPC · JPL
7584 Ossietzky	1991 GK_{10}	Ossietzky	April 9, 1991	Tautenburg Observatory	F. Börngen	·	6.0 km (3.7 mi)	MPC · JPL
7585	1991 PK_{8}	—	August 5, 1991	Palomar	H. E. Holt	·	16 km (9.9 mi)	MPC · JPL
7586 Bismarck	1991 RH_{7}	Bismarck	September 13, 1991	Tautenburg Observatory	L. D. Schmadel, F. Börngen	DOR	12 km (7.5 mi)	MPC · JPL
7587 Weckmann	1992 CF_{3}	Weckmann	February 2, 1992	La Silla	E. W. Elst	·	3.7 km (2.3 mi)	MPC · JPL
7588	1992 FJ_{1}	—	March 24, 1992	Siding Spring	R. H. McNaught	·	37 km (23 mi)	MPC · JPL
7589	1992 SR_{1}	—	September 26, 1992	Dynic	A. Sugie	·	3.8 km (2.4 mi)	MPC · JPL
7590 Aterui	1992 UP_{4}	Aterui	October 26, 1992	Kitami	K. Endate, K. Watanabe	·	4.2 km (2.6 mi)	MPC · JPL
7591	1992 WG_{3}	—	November 18, 1992	Kushiro	S. Ueda, H. Kaneda	NYS	4.4 km (2.7 mi)	MPC · JPL
7592 Takinemachi	1992 WR_{3}	Takinemachi	November 23, 1992	Kiyosato	S. Otomo	EUN	8.3 km (5.2 mi)	MPC · JPL
7593 Cernuschi	1992 WP_{4}	Cernuschi	November 21, 1992	Palomar	E. F. Helin	·	8.6 km (5.3 mi)	MPC · JPL
7594 Shotaro	1993 BH_{2}	Shotaro	January 19, 1993	Geisei	T. Seki	·	7.7 km (4.8 mi)	MPC · JPL
7595 Växjö	1993 FN_{26}	Växjö	March 21, 1993	La Silla	UESAC	·	16 km (9.9 mi)	MPC · JPL
7596 Yumi	1993 GH	Yumi	April 10, 1993	Kitami	K. Endate, K. Watanabe	EOS	13 km (8.1 mi)	MPC · JPL
7597 Shigemi	1993 GM	Shigemi	April 14, 1993	Kiyosato	S. Otomo	KOR	8.8 km (5.5 mi)	MPC · JPL
7598	1994 CS	—	February 4, 1994	Kushiro	S. Ueda, H. Kaneda	·	9.2 km (5.7 mi)	MPC · JPL
7599 Munari	1994 PB	Munari	August 3, 1994	San Marcello	A. Boattini, M. Tombelli	·	8.8 km (5.5 mi)	MPC · JPL
7600 Vacchi	1994 RB_{1}	Vacchi	September 9, 1994	Colleverde	V. S. Casulli	·	9.1 km (5.7 mi)	MPC · JPL

== 7601–7700 ==
back to top

Designation			Discovery			Properties		Ref
Permanent	Provisional	Named after	Date	Site	Discoverer(s)	Category	Diam.	Ref
7601	1994 US_{1}	—	October 25, 1994	Kushiro	S. Ueda, H. Kaneda	MAR	7.3 km (4.5 mi)	MPC · JPL
7602 Yidaeam	1994 YW_{1}	Yidaeam	December 31, 1994	Oizumi	T. Kobayashi	EOS	9.6 km (6.0 mi)	MPC · JPL
7603 Salopia	1995 OA_{2}	Salopia	July 25, 1995	Church Stretton	S. P. Laurie	EOS · slow	8.4 km (5.2 mi)	MPC · JPL
7604 Kridsadaporn	1995 QY_{2}	Kridsadaporn	August 31, 1995	Siding Spring	R. H. McNaught	T_{j} (2.86)	10 km (6.2 mi)	MPC · JPL
7605 Cindygraber	1995 SR_{1}	Cindygraber	September 21, 1995	Catalina Station	T. B. Spahr	(7605)	38 km (24 mi)	MPC · JPL
7606	1995 SV_{2}	—	September 20, 1995	Kushiro	S. Ueda, H. Kaneda	·	4.8 km (3.0 mi)	MPC · JPL
7607 Billmerline	1995 SB_{13}	Billmerline	September 18, 1995	Kitt Peak	Spacewatch	HOF	12 km (7.5 mi)	MPC · JPL
7608 Telegramia	1995 UO_{1}	Telegramia	October 22, 1995	Kleť	J. Tichá	NYS	4.0 km (2.5 mi)	MPC · JPL
7609	1995 WX_{3}	—	November 18, 1995	Nachi-Katsuura	Y. Shimizu, T. Urata	·	6.9 km (4.3 mi)	MPC · JPL
7610 Sudbury	1995 XB	Sudbury	December 3, 1995	Sudbury	D. di Cicco	KOR	6.3 km (3.9 mi)	MPC · JPL
7611 Hashitatsu	1996 BW_{1}	Hashitatsu	January 23, 1996	Oizumi	T. Kobayashi	·	24 km (15 mi)	MPC · JPL
7612	1996 CN_{2}	—	February 12, 1996	Kushiro	S. Ueda, H. Kaneda	VER	23 km (14 mi)	MPC · JPL
7613 ʻAkikiki	1996 DK	ʻAkikiki	February 16, 1996	Haleakalā	NEAT	(3460)	9.4 km (5.8 mi)	MPC · JPL
7614 Masatomi	1996 EA	Masatomi	March 2, 1996	Oizumi	T. Kobayashi	·	5.3 km (3.3 mi)	MPC · JPL
7615	1996 TA_{11}	—	October 9, 1996	Kushiro	S. Ueda, H. Kaneda	NYS · moon	3.9 km (2.4 mi)	MPC · JPL
7616 Sadako	1996 VF_{2}	Sadako	November 6, 1996	Oizumi	T. Kobayashi	EOS	12 km (7.5 mi)	MPC · JPL
7617	1996 VF_{30}	—	November 7, 1996	Kushiro	S. Ueda, H. Kaneda	DOR	12 km (7.5 mi)	MPC · JPL
7618 Gotoyukichi	1997 AU_{4}	Gotoyukichi	January 6, 1997	Oizumi	T. Kobayashi	·	5.7 km (3.5 mi)	MPC · JPL
7619	1997 AP_{21}	—	January 13, 1997	Nachi-Katsuura	Y. Shimizu, T. Urata	·	2.4 km (1.5 mi)	MPC · JPL
7620 Willaert	4077 P-L	Willaert	September 24, 1960	Palomar	C. J. van Houten, I. van Houten-Groeneveld, T. Gehrels	NYS	2.1 km (1.3 mi)	MPC · JPL
7621 Sweelinck	4127 P-L	Sweelinck	September 24, 1960	Palomar	C. J. van Houten, I. van Houten-Groeneveld, T. Gehrels	THM	6.5 km (4.0 mi)	MPC · JPL
7622 Pergolesi	6624 P-L	Pergolesi	September 24, 1960	Palomar	C. J. van Houten, I. van Houten-Groeneveld, T. Gehrels	·	3.0 km (1.9 mi)	MPC · JPL
7623 Stamitz	9508 P-L	Stamitz	October 17, 1960	Palomar	C. J. van Houten, I. van Houten-Groeneveld, T. Gehrels	THM	13 km (8.1 mi)	MPC · JPL
7624 Gluck	1251 T-1	Gluck	March 25, 1971	Palomar	C. J. van Houten, I. van Houten-Groeneveld, T. Gehrels	EOS	8.3 km (5.2 mi)	MPC · JPL
7625 Louisspohr	2150 T-2	Louisspohr	September 29, 1973	Palomar	C. J. van Houten, I. van Houten-Groeneveld, T. Gehrels	·	9.5 km (5.9 mi)	MPC · JPL
7626 Iafe	1976 QL_{2}	Iafe	August 20, 1976	El Leoncito	Félix Aguilar Observatory	VER	17 km (11 mi)	MPC · JPL
7627 Wakenokiyomaro	1977 DS_{4}	Wakenokiyomaro	February 18, 1977	Kiso	H. Kosai, K. Furukawa	·	6.2 km (3.9 mi)	MPC · JPL
7628 Evgenifedorov	1977 QY	Evgenifedorov	August 19, 1977	Nauchnij	N. S. Chernykh	EUN	6.9 km (4.3 mi)	MPC · JPL
7629 Foros	1977 QK_{1}	Foros	August 19, 1977	Nauchnij	N. S. Chernykh	NYS	2.8 km (1.7 mi)	MPC · JPL
7630 Yidumduma	1979 MR_{2}	Yidumduma	June 25, 1979	Siding Spring	E. F. Helin, S. J. Bus	KOR	6.4 km (4.0 mi)	MPC · JPL
7631 Vokrouhlický	1981 WH	Vokrouhlický	November 20, 1981	Anderson Mesa	E. Bowell	·	3.8 km (2.4 mi)	MPC · JPL
7632 Stanislav	1982 UT_{5}	Stanislav	October 20, 1982	Nauchnij	L. G. Karachkina	·	4.6 km (2.9 mi)	MPC · JPL
7633 Volodymyr	1982 UD_{7}	Volodymyr	October 21, 1982	Nauchnij	L. G. Karachkina	RAF	5.0 km (3.1 mi)	MPC · JPL
7634 Shizutani-Kou	1982 VO_{3}	Shizutani-Kou	November 14, 1982	Kiso	H. Kosai, K. Furukawa	THM	9.9 km (6.2 mi)	MPC · JPL
7635 Carolinesmith	1983 VH_{1}	Carolinesmith	November 6, 1983	Kleť	A. Mrkos	EOS ·	24 km (15 mi)	MPC · JPL
7636 Comba	1984 CM	Comba	February 5, 1984	Anderson Mesa	E. Bowell	slow	11 km (6.8 mi)	MPC · JPL
7637	1984 DN	—	February 23, 1984	La Silla	H. Debehogne	·	7.1 km (4.4 mi)	MPC · JPL
7638 Gladman	1984 UX	Gladman	October 26, 1984	Anderson Mesa	E. Bowell	(887)	5.8 km (3.6 mi)	MPC · JPL
7639 Offutt	1985 DC_{1}	Offutt	February 21, 1985	Harvard Observatory	Oak Ridge Observatory	THM	12 km (7.5 mi)	MPC · JPL
7640 Marzari	1985 PX	Marzari	August 14, 1985	Anderson Mesa	E. Bowell	·	3.1 km (1.9 mi)	MPC · JPL
7641 Cteatus	1986 TT_{6}	Cteatus	October 5, 1986	Piwnice	M. Antal	L4	72 km (45 mi)	MPC · JPL
7642	1988 TZ	—	October 13, 1988	Kushiro	S. Ueda, H. Kaneda	·	2.5 km (1.6 mi)	MPC · JPL
7643	1988 VQ_{1}	—	November 6, 1988	Yorii	M. Arai, H. Mori	·	2.9 km (1.8 mi)	MPC · JPL
7644 Cslewis	1988 VR_{5}	Cslewis	November 4, 1988	Kleť	A. Mrkos	MAR	5.8 km (3.6 mi)	MPC · JPL
7645 Pons	1989 AC_{2}	Pons	January 4, 1989	Kleť	A. Mrkos	·	4.1 km (2.5 mi)	MPC · JPL
7646	1989 KE	—	May 29, 1989	Palomar	H. E. Holt	EUN	4.8 km (3.0 mi)	MPC · JPL
7647 Etrépigny	1989 SR_{2}	Etrépigny	September 26, 1989	La Silla	E. W. Elst	KOR	7.0 km (4.3 mi)	MPC · JPL
7648 Tomboles	1989 TB_{1}	Tomboles	October 8, 1989	Kani	Y. Mizuno, T. Furuta	·	3.9 km (2.4 mi)	MPC · JPL
7649 Bougainville	1990 SV_{5}	Bougainville	September 22, 1990	La Silla	E. W. Elst	·	4.7 km (2.9 mi)	MPC · JPL
7650 Kaname	1990 UG	Kaname	October 16, 1990	Geisei	T. Seki	NAE	18 km (11 mi)	MPC · JPL
7651 Villeneuve	1990 VD_{6}	Villeneuve	November 15, 1990	La Silla	E. W. Elst	GEF · slow	6.5 km (4.0 mi)	MPC · JPL
7652	1991 RL_{5}	—	September 13, 1991	Palomar	H. E. Holt	·	10 km (6.2 mi)	MPC · JPL
7653	1991 UV	—	October 18, 1991	Kushiro	S. Ueda, H. Kaneda	·	5.2 km (3.2 mi)	MPC · JPL
7654	1991 VV_{3}	—	November 11, 1991	Kushiro	S. Ueda, H. Kaneda	NYS	5.0 km (3.1 mi)	MPC · JPL
7655 Adamries	1991 YM_{1}	Adamries	December 28, 1991	Tautenburg Observatory	F. Börngen	NYS	4.1 km (2.5 mi)	MPC · JPL
7656 Joemontani	1992 HX	Joemontani	April 24, 1992	Kitt Peak	Spacewatch	·	8.0 km (5.0 mi)	MPC · JPL
7657 Jefflarsen	1992 HK_{1}	Jefflarsen	April 25, 1992	Kitt Peak	Spacewatch	KOR	6.6 km (4.1 mi)	MPC · JPL
7658	1993 BM_{12}	—	January 22, 1993	Kushiro	S. Ueda, H. Kaneda	NYS	4.9 km (3.0 mi)	MPC · JPL
7659	1993 CP_{1}	—	February 15, 1993	Kushiro	S. Ueda, H. Kaneda	EUN	5.8 km (3.6 mi)	MPC · JPL
7660 Alexanderwilson	1993 VM_{1}	Alexanderwilson	November 5, 1993	Siding Spring	R. H. McNaught	H	3.2 km (2.0 mi)	MPC · JPL
7661 Reincken	1994 PK_{38}	Reincken	August 10, 1994	La Silla	E. W. Elst	KOR	3.7 km (2.3 mi)	MPC · JPL
7662	1994 RM_{1}	—	September 3, 1994	Nachi-Katsuura	Y. Shimizu, T. Urata	·	20 km (12 mi)	MPC · JPL
7663	1994 RX_{1}	—	September 2, 1994	Palomar	E. F. Helin	PHO · slow	5.2 km (3.2 mi)	MPC · JPL
7664 Namahage	1994 TE_{3}	Namahage	October 2, 1994	Kitami	K. Endate, K. Watanabe	KOR	6.9 km (4.3 mi)	MPC · JPL
7665 Putignano	1994 TK_{3}	Putignano	October 11, 1994	Colleverde	V. S. Casulli	KOR	6.5 km (4.0 mi)	MPC · JPL
7666 Keyaki	1994 VC_{1}	Keyaki	November 4, 1994	Sendai	Cross, K.	·	5.2 km (3.2 mi)	MPC · JPL
7667	1995 BL_{3}	—	January 29, 1995	Nachi-Katsuura	Y. Shimizu, T. Urata	EOS	12 km (7.5 mi)	MPC · JPL
7668 Mizunotakao	1995 BR_{3}	Mizunotakao	January 31, 1995	Oizumi	T. Kobayashi	NYS	4.0 km (2.5 mi)	MPC · JPL
7669 Malše	1995 PB	Malše	August 4, 1995	Kleť	M. Tichý, Z. Moravec	·	4.7 km (2.9 mi)	MPC · JPL
7670 Kabeláč	1995 QJ	Kabeláč	August 20, 1995	Ondřejov	L. Kotková	NYS	1.8 km (1.1 mi)	MPC · JPL
7671 Albis	1995 UK_{1}	Albis	October 22, 1995	Kleť	Z. Moravec	·	2.4 km (1.5 mi)	MPC · JPL
7672 Hawking	1995 UO_{2}	Hawking	October 24, 1995	Kleť	Kleť	·	2.0 km (1.2 mi)	MPC · JPL
7673 Inohara	1995 UY_{3}	Inohara	October 20, 1995	Oizumi	T. Kobayashi	NYS	5.8 km (3.6 mi)	MPC · JPL
7674 Kasuga	1995 VO_{1}	Kasuga	November 15, 1995	Kitami	K. Endate, K. Watanabe	KOR	9.4 km (5.8 mi)	MPC · JPL
7675 Gorizia	1995 WT_{5}	Gorizia	November 23, 1995	Farra d'Isonzo	Farra d'Isonzo	·	5.6 km (3.5 mi)	MPC · JPL
7676	1995 WN_{8}	—	November 18, 1995	Nachi-Katsuura	Y. Shimizu, T. Urata	PHO	6.1 km (3.8 mi)	MPC · JPL
7677 Sawa	1995 YP_{3}	Sawa	December 27, 1995	Oizumi	T. Kobayashi	·	6.3 km (3.9 mi)	MPC · JPL
7678 Onoda	1996 CW_{2}	Onoda	February 15, 1996	Kuma Kogen	A. Nakamura	VER	9.2 km (5.7 mi)	MPC · JPL
7679 Asiago	1996 CA_{9}	Asiago	February 15, 1996	Cima Ekar	U. Munari, M. Tombelli	EUN	5.7 km (3.5 mi)	MPC · JPL
7680 Cari	1996 HB	Cari	April 16, 1996	Stroncone	Santa Lucia	·	11 km (6.8 mi)	MPC · JPL
7681 Chenjingrun	1996 YK_{2}	Chenjingrun	December 24, 1996	Xinglong	SCAP	slow	9.0 km (5.6 mi)	MPC · JPL
7682 Miura	1997 CY_{19}	Miura	February 12, 1997	Oizumi	T. Kobayashi	·	4.4 km (2.7 mi)	MPC · JPL
7683 Wuwenjun	1997 DE	Wuwenjun	February 19, 1997	Xinglong	SCAP	·	5.8 km (3.6 mi)	MPC · JPL
7684 Marioferrero	1997 EY	Marioferrero	March 3, 1997	Prescott	P. G. Comba	AGN	6.3 km (3.9 mi)	MPC · JPL
7685	1997 EP_{17}	—	March 1, 1997	Kushiro	S. Ueda, H. Kaneda	·	4.5 km (2.8 mi)	MPC · JPL
7686 Wolfernst	2024 P-L	Wolfernst	September 24, 1960	Palomar	C. J. van Houten, I. van Houten-Groeneveld, T. Gehrels	·	4.4 km (2.7 mi)	MPC · JPL
7687 Matthias	2099 P-L	Matthias	September 24, 1960	Palomar	C. J. van Houten, I. van Houten-Groeneveld, T. Gehrels	·	3.5 km (2.2 mi)	MPC · JPL
7688 Lothar	2536 P-L	Lothar	September 24, 1960	Palomar	C. J. van Houten, I. van Houten-Groeneveld, T. Gehrels	V	4.3 km (2.7 mi)	MPC · JPL
7689 Reinerstoss	4036 P-L	Reinerstoss	September 24, 1960	Palomar	C. J. van Houten, I. van Houten-Groeneveld, T. Gehrels	KOR	4.4 km (2.7 mi)	MPC · JPL
7690 Sackler	2291 T-1	Sackler	March 25, 1971	Palomar	C. J. van Houten, I. van Houten-Groeneveld, T. Gehrels	·	9.9 km (6.2 mi)	MPC · JPL
7691 Brady	3186 T-3	Brady	October 16, 1977	Palomar	C. J. van Houten, I. van Houten-Groeneveld, T. Gehrels	NYS	3.9 km (2.4 mi)	MPC · JPL
7692 Edhenderson	1981 EZ_{25}	Edhenderson	March 2, 1981	Siding Spring	S. J. Bus	·	12 km (7.5 mi)	MPC · JPL
7693 Hoshitakuhai	1982 WE	Hoshitakuhai	November 20, 1982	Geisei	T. Seki	·	5.8 km (3.6 mi)	MPC · JPL
7694 Krasetín	1983 SF	Krasetín	September 29, 1983	Kleť	A. Mrkos	EOS · slow	12 km (7.5 mi)	MPC · JPL
7695 Přemysl	1984 WA_{1}	Přemysl	November 27, 1984	Kleť	A. Mrkos	·	3.4 km (2.1 mi)	MPC · JPL
7696 Liebe	1988 JD	Liebe	May 10, 1988	La Silla	W. Landgraf	·	5.0 km (3.1 mi)	MPC · JPL
7697	1989 AE	—	January 3, 1989	Chiyoda	T. Kojima	·	3.8 km (2.4 mi)	MPC · JPL
7698 Schweitzer	1989 AS_{6}	Schweitzer	January 11, 1989	Tautenburg Observatory	F. Börngen	NYS	3.6 km (2.2 mi)	MPC · JPL
7699 Božek	1989 CB_{4}	Božek	February 2, 1989	Kleť	A. Mrkos	·	3.9 km (2.4 mi)	MPC · JPL
7700 Rote Kapelle	1990 TE_{8}	Rote Kapelle	October 13, 1990	Tautenburg Observatory	F. Börngen, L. D. Schmadel	·	3.0 km (1.9 mi)	MPC · JPL

== 7701–7800 ==
back to top

Designation			Discovery			Properties		Ref
Permanent	Provisional	Named after	Date	Site	Discoverer(s)	Category	Diam.	Ref
7701 Zrzavý	1990 TX_{8}	Zrzavý	October 14, 1990	Kleť	A. Mrkos	·	5.0 km (3.1 mi)	MPC · JPL
7702	1991 PO_{13}	—	August 5, 1991	Palomar	H. E. Holt	·	3.0 km (1.9 mi)	MPC · JPL
7703 Jimcooney	1991 RW	Jimcooney	September 7, 1991	Palomar	E. F. Helin	PHO	7.2 km (4.5 mi)	MPC · JPL
7704 Dellen	1992 EB_{7}	Dellen	March 1, 1992	La Silla	UESAC	·	4.8 km (3.0 mi)	MPC · JPL
7705 Humeln	1993 FU_{7}	Humeln	March 17, 1993	La Silla	UESAC	NYS	3.5 km (2.2 mi)	MPC · JPL
7706 Mien	1993 FZ_{36}	Mien	March 19, 1993	La Silla	UESAC	NYS	5.2 km (3.2 mi)	MPC · JPL
7707 Yes	1993 HM_{1}	Yes	April 17, 1993	Catalina Station	C. W. Hergenrother	·	7.5 km (4.7 mi)	MPC · JPL
7708 Fennimore	1994 GF_{9}	Fennimore	April 11, 1994	Kushiro	S. Ueda, H. Kaneda	NYS	6.5 km (4.0 mi)	MPC · JPL
7709	1994 RN_{1}	—	September 8, 1994	Nachi-Katsuura	Y. Shimizu, T. Urata	·	3.8 km (2.4 mi)	MPC · JPL
7710 Ishibashi	1994 WT_{2}	Ishibashi	November 30, 1994	Oizumi	T. Kobayashi	CYB	17 km (11 mi)	MPC · JPL
7711 Říp	1994 XF	Říp	December 2, 1994	Kleť	Z. Moravec	·	17 km (11 mi)	MPC · JPL
7712	1995 TB_{1}	—	October 12, 1995	Nachi-Katsuura	Y. Shimizu, T. Urata	·	4.4 km (2.7 mi)	MPC · JPL
7713 Tsutomu	1995 YE	Tsutomu	December 17, 1995	Oizumi	T. Kobayashi	NYS	3.1 km (1.9 mi)	MPC · JPL
7714 Briccialdi	1996 CC_{1}	Briccialdi	February 9, 1996	Stroncone	Santa Lucia	·	2.9 km (1.8 mi)	MPC · JPL
7715 Leonidarosino	1996 CR_{7}	Leonidarosino	February 14, 1996	Cima Ekar	U. Munari, M. Tombelli	MAR	6.6 km (4.1 mi)	MPC · JPL
7716 Ube	1996 DA_{3}	Ube	February 22, 1996	Kuma Kogen	A. Nakamura	V	3.6 km (2.2 mi)	MPC · JPL
7717 Tabeisshi	1997 AL_{5}	Tabeisshi	January 7, 1997	Oizumi	T. Kobayashi	·	4.0 km (2.5 mi)	MPC · JPL
7718 Desnoux	1997 EP_{30}	Desnoux	March 10, 1997	Ramonville	Buil, C.	EOS	14 km (8.7 mi)	MPC · JPL
7719	1997 GT_{36}	—	April 7, 1997	Socorro	LINEAR	KOR	4.7 km (2.9 mi)	MPC · JPL
7720 Lepaute	4559 P-L	Lepaute	September 26, 1960	Palomar	C. J. van Houten, I. van Houten-Groeneveld, T. Gehrels	THM	5.6 km (3.5 mi)	MPC · JPL
7721 Andrillat	6612 P-L	Andrillat	September 24, 1960	Palomar	C. J. van Houten, I. van Houten-Groeneveld, T. Gehrels	(5)	4.6 km (2.9 mi)	MPC · JPL
7722 Firneis	2240 T-2	Firneis	September 29, 1973	Palomar	C. J. van Houten, I. van Houten-Groeneveld, T. Gehrels	·	5.7 km (3.5 mi)	MPC · JPL
7723 Lugger	1952 QW	Lugger	August 28, 1952	Brooklyn	Indiana University	·	3.4 km (2.1 mi)	MPC · JPL
7724 Moroso	1970 OB	Moroso	July 24, 1970	El Leoncito	Félix Aguilar Observatory	·	4.4 km (2.7 mi)	MPC · JPL
7725 Selʹvinskij	1972 RX_{1}	Selʹvinskij	September 11, 1972	Nauchnij	N. S. Chernykh	·	9.9 km (6.2 mi)	MPC · JPL
7726 Olegbykov	1974 QM_{2}	Olegbykov	August 27, 1974	Nauchnij	L. I. Chernykh	·	3.5 km (2.2 mi)	MPC · JPL
7727 Chepurova	1975 EA_{3}	Chepurova	March 8, 1975	Nauchnij	N. S. Chernykh	slow	9.2 km (5.7 mi)	MPC · JPL
7728 Giblin	1977 AW_{2}	Giblin	January 12, 1977	Palomar	E. Bowell	AGN	6.5 km (4.0 mi)	MPC · JPL
7729 Golovanov	1977 QY_{3}	Golovanov	August 24, 1977	Nauchnij	N. S. Chernykh	·	6.8 km (4.2 mi)	MPC · JPL
7730 Sergerasimov	1978 NN_{1}	Sergerasimov	July 4, 1978	Nauchnij	L. I. Chernykh	·	15 km (9.3 mi)	MPC · JPL
7731	1978 UV	—	October 28, 1978	Anderson Mesa	H. L. Giclas	·	12 km (7.5 mi)	MPC · JPL
7732 Ralphpass	1978 VE_{9}	Ralphpass	November 7, 1978	Palomar	E. F. Helin, S. J. Bus	·	7.8 km (4.8 mi)	MPC · JPL
7733 Segarpassi	1979 MH_{4}	Segarpassi	June 25, 1979	Siding Spring	E. F. Helin, S. J. Bus	·	2.3 km (1.4 mi)	MPC · JPL
7734 Kaltenegger	1979 MZ_{6}	Kaltenegger	June 25, 1979	Siding Spring	E. F. Helin, S. J. Bus	·	4.8 km (3.0 mi)	MPC · JPL
7735 Scorzelli	1980 UL_{1}	Scorzelli	October 31, 1980	Palomar	S. J. Bus	GEF	6.7 km (4.2 mi)	MPC · JPL
7736 Nizhnij Novgorod	1981 RC_{5}	Nizhnij Novgorod	September 8, 1981	Nauchnij	L. V. Zhuravleva	EUN	7.7 km (4.8 mi)	MPC · JPL
7737 Sirrah	1981 VU	Sirrah	November 5, 1981	Anderson Mesa	E. Bowell	NYS	4.9 km (3.0 mi)	MPC · JPL
7738 Heyman	1981 WS_{1}	Heyman	November 24, 1981	Harvard Observatory	Oak Ridge Observatory	·	3.9 km (2.4 mi)	MPC · JPL
7739 Čech	1982 CE	Čech	February 14, 1982	Kleť	L. Brožek	·	4.2 km (2.6 mi)	MPC · JPL
7740 Petit	1983 RR_{2}	Petit	September 6, 1983	Anderson Mesa	E. Bowell	V	5.1 km (3.2 mi)	MPC · JPL
7741 Fedoseev	1983 RR_{4}	Fedoseev	September 1, 1983	Nauchnij	L. G. Karachkina	PHO	5.5 km (3.4 mi)	MPC · JPL
7742 Altamira	1985 US	Altamira	October 20, 1985	Kleť	A. Mrkos	·	6.5 km (4.0 mi)	MPC · JPL
7743	1986 JA	—	May 2, 1986	Brorfelde	Copenhagen Observatory	slow	8.8 km (5.5 mi)	MPC · JPL
7744	1986 QA_{1}	—	August 26, 1986	La Silla	H. Debehogne	(7744)	5.5 km (3.4 mi)	MPC · JPL
7745	1987 DB_{6}	—	February 22, 1987	La Silla	H. Debehogne	DOR	13 km (8.1 mi)	MPC · JPL
7746	1987 RC_{1}	—	September 13, 1987	La Silla	H. Debehogne	THM	19 km (12 mi)	MPC · JPL
7747 Michałowski	1987 SO	Michałowski	September 19, 1987	Anderson Mesa	E. Bowell	·	4.6 km (2.9 mi)	MPC · JPL
7748	1987 TA	—	October 12, 1987	Ojima	T. Niijima, T. Urata	·	4.1 km (2.5 mi)	MPC · JPL
7749 Jackschmitt	1988 JP	Jackschmitt	May 12, 1988	Palomar	C. S. Shoemaker, E. M. Shoemaker	·	8.0 km (5.0 mi)	MPC · JPL
7750 McEwen	1988 QD_{1}	McEwen	August 18, 1988	Palomar	C. S. Shoemaker, E. M. Shoemaker	·	14 km (8.7 mi)	MPC · JPL
7751	1988 UA	—	October 16, 1988	Kushiro	S. Ueda, H. Kaneda	·	4.2 km (2.6 mi)	MPC · JPL
7752 Otauchunokai	1988 US	Otauchunokai	October 31, 1988	Ojima	T. Niijima, K. Kanai	·	5.4 km (3.4 mi)	MPC · JPL
7753	1988 XB	—	December 5, 1988	Gekko	Y. Oshima	APO +1 km (0.62 mi) · PHA	890 m (2,920 ft)	MPC · JPL
7754 Gopalan	1989 TT_{11}	Gopalan	October 2, 1989	Cerro Tololo	S. J. Bus	KOR	8.6 km (5.3 mi)	MPC · JPL
7755 Haute-Provence	1989 YO_{5}	Haute-Provence	December 28, 1989	Haute-Provence	E. W. Elst	THM	18 km (11 mi)	MPC · JPL
7756 Scientia	1990 FR_{1}	Scientia	March 27, 1990	Palomar	C. S. Shoemaker, E. M. Shoemaker	·	16 km (9.9 mi)	MPC · JPL
7757 Kameya	1990 KO	Kameya	May 22, 1990	Palomar	E. F. Helin	PHO	6.0 km (3.7 mi)	MPC · JPL
7758 Poulanderson	1990 KT	Poulanderson	May 21, 1990	Palomar	E. F. Helin	PHO	3.8 km (2.4 mi)	MPC · JPL
7759	1990 QD_{2}	—	August 22, 1990	Palomar	H. E. Holt	·	5.0 km (3.1 mi)	MPC · JPL
7760	1990 RW_{3}	—	September 14, 1990	Palomar	H. E. Holt	MAS	4.9 km (3.0 mi)	MPC · JPL
7761	1990 SL	—	September 20, 1990	Siding Spring	R. H. McNaught	·	4.9 km (3.0 mi)	MPC · JPL
7762	1990 SY_{2}	—	September 18, 1990	Palomar	H. E. Holt	KOR	8.4 km (5.2 mi)	MPC · JPL
7763 Crabeels	1990 UT_{5}	Crabeels	October 16, 1990	La Silla	E. W. Elst	AGN	7.8 km (4.8 mi)	MPC · JPL
7764	1991 AB	—	January 7, 1991	Karasuyama	S. Inoda, T. Urata	ADE	14 km (8.7 mi)	MPC · JPL
7765	1991 AD	—	January 8, 1991	Yatsugatake	Y. Kushida, O. Muramatsu	·	7.7 km (4.8 mi)	MPC · JPL
7766 Jododaira	1991 BH_{2}	Jododaira	January 23, 1991	Kitami	K. Endate, K. Watanabe	EOS	9.7 km (6.0 mi)	MPC · JPL
7767 Tomatic	1991 RB_{5}	Tomatic	September 13, 1991	Tautenburg Observatory	L. D. Schmadel, F. Börngen	·	6.2 km (3.9 mi)	MPC · JPL
7768	1991 SX_{1}	—	September 16, 1991	Palomar	H. E. Holt	·	4.8 km (3.0 mi)	MPC · JPL
7769 Okuni	1991 VF_{4}	Okuni	November 4, 1991	Kiyosato	S. Otomo	V	5.9 km (3.7 mi)	MPC · JPL
7770 Siljan	1992 EQ_{8}	Siljan	March 2, 1992	La Silla	UESAC	KOR	9.8 km (6.1 mi)	MPC · JPL
7771 Tvären	1992 EZ_{9}	Tvären	March 2, 1992	La Silla	UESAC	·	6.2 km (3.9 mi)	MPC · JPL
7772	1992 EQ_{15}	—	March 1, 1992	La Silla	UESAC	·	6.8 km (4.2 mi)	MPC · JPL
7773 Kyokuchiken	1992 FS	Kyokuchiken	March 23, 1992	Kitami	K. Endate, K. Watanabe	·	8.1 km (5.0 mi)	MPC · JPL
7774	1992 UU_{2}	—	October 19, 1992	Kitami	K. Endate, K. Watanabe	·	4.1 km (2.5 mi)	MPC · JPL
7775 Taiko	1992 XD	Taiko	December 4, 1992	Yatsugatake	Y. Kushida, O. Muramatsu	·	8.7 km (5.4 mi)	MPC · JPL
7776 Takeishi	1993 BF	Takeishi	January 20, 1993	Oohira	T. Urata	·	6.2 km (3.9 mi)	MPC · JPL
7777 Consadole	1993 CO_{1}	Consadole	February 15, 1993	Kushiro	S. Ueda, H. Kaneda	fast	3.4 km (2.1 mi)	MPC · JPL
7778 Markrobinson	1993 HK_{1}	Markrobinson	April 17, 1993	Palomar	C. S. Shoemaker, E. M. Shoemaker	·	9.0 km (5.6 mi)	MPC · JPL
7779 Susanring	1993 KL	Susanring	May 19, 1993	Palomar	Child, J. B.	PHO	4.7 km (2.9 mi)	MPC · JPL
7780 Maren	1993 NJ	Maren	July 15, 1993	Palomar	E. F. Helin, Child, J. B.	·	5.7 km (3.5 mi)	MPC · JPL
7781 Townsend	1993 QT	Townsend	August 19, 1993	Palomar	E. F. Helin	H	2.5 km (1.6 mi)	MPC · JPL
7782 Mony	1994 CY	Mony	February 7, 1994	Stroncone	Santa Lucia	·	11 km (6.8 mi)	MPC · JPL
7783	1994 JD	—	May 4, 1994	Catalina Station	T. B. Spahr	H	2.2 km (1.4 mi)	MPC · JPL
7784 Watterson	1994 PL	Watterson	August 5, 1994	Catalina Station	T. B. Spahr	PHO	5.6 km (3.5 mi)	MPC · JPL
7785	1994 QW	—	August 29, 1994	Nachi-Katsuura	Y. Shimizu, T. Urata	·	4.4 km (2.7 mi)	MPC · JPL
7786 Norikazunagata	1994 TB_{15}	Norikazunagata	October 14, 1994	Nachi-Katsuura	Y. Shimizu, T. Urata	·	4.1 km (2.5 mi)	MPC · JPL
7787 Annalaura	1994 WW	Annalaura	November 23, 1994	San Marcello	L. Tesi, A. Boattini	·	2.6 km (1.6 mi)	MPC · JPL
7788 Tsukuba	1994 XS	Tsukuba	December 5, 1994	Kuma Kogen	A. Nakamura	·	9.7 km (6.0 mi)	MPC · JPL
7789 Kwiatkowski	1994 XE_{6}	Kwiatkowski	December 2, 1994	Palomar	E. Bowell	·	3.8 km (2.4 mi)	MPC · JPL
7790 Miselli	1995 DK_{2}	Miselli	February 28, 1995	Stroncone	Santa Lucia	(1298)	7.6 km (4.7 mi)	MPC · JPL
7791 Ebicykl	1995 EB	Ebicykl	March 1, 1995	Kleť	M. Tichý	·	10 km (6.2 mi)	MPC · JPL
7792	1995 WZ_{3}	—	November 18, 1995	Nachi-Katsuura	Y. Shimizu, T. Urata	moon	7.4 km (4.6 mi)	MPC · JPL
7793 Mutlu-Pakdil	1995 YC_{3}	Mutlu-Pakdil	December 27, 1995	Haleakalā	NEAT	·	12 km (7.5 mi)	MPC · JPL
7794 Sanvito	1996 AD_{4}	Sanvito	January 15, 1996	Cima Ekar	U. Munari, M. Tombelli	V	4.6 km (2.9 mi)	MPC · JPL
7795	1996 AN_{15}	—	January 14, 1996	Xinglong	SCAP	·	2.8 km (1.7 mi)	MPC · JPL
7796 Járacimrman	1996 BG	Járacimrman	January 16, 1996	Kleť	Z. Moravec	ADE	11 km (6.8 mi)	MPC · JPL
7797 Morita	1996 BK_{2}	Morita	January 26, 1996	Oizumi	T. Kobayashi	·	13 km (8.1 mi)	MPC · JPL
7798	1996 CL	—	February 1, 1996	Xinglong	SCAP	·	5.0 km (3.1 mi)	MPC · JPL
7799 Martinšolc	1996 DW_{1}	Martinšolc	February 24, 1996	Kleť	Kleť	·	4.7 km (2.9 mi)	MPC · JPL
7800 Zhongkeyuan	1996 EW_{2}	Zhongkeyuan	March 11, 1996	Xinglong	SCAP	·	3.5 km (2.2 mi)	MPC · JPL

== 7801–7900 ==
back to top

Designation			Discovery			Properties		Ref
Permanent	Provisional	Named after	Date	Site	Discoverer(s)	Category	Diam.	Ref
7801 Goretti	1996 GG_{2}	Goretti	April 12, 1996	San Marcello	L. Tesi, A. Boattini	·	6.9 km (4.3 mi)	MPC · JPL
7802 Takiguchi	1996 XG_{1}	Takiguchi	December 2, 1996	Ōizumi	T. Kobayashi	NYS ·	9.3 km (5.8 mi)	MPC · JPL
7803 Adachi	1997 EW_{2}	Adachi	March 4, 1997	Ōizumi	T. Kobayashi	AGN	6.4 km (4.0 mi)	MPC · JPL
7804 Boesgaard	3083 P-L	Boesgaard	September 24, 1960	Palomar	C. J. van Houten, I. van Houten-Groeneveld, T. Gehrels	·	7.5 km (4.7 mi)	MPC · JPL
7805 Moons	7610 P-L	Moons	October 17, 1960	Palomar	C. J. van Houten, I. van Houten-Groeneveld, T. Gehrels	·	3.4 km (2.1 mi)	MPC · JPL
7806 Umasslowell	1971 UM	Umasslowell	October 26, 1971	Hamburg-Bergedorf	L. Kohoutek	NYS	3.9 km (2.4 mi)	MPC · JPL
7807 Grier	1975 SJ_{1}	Grier	September 30, 1975	Palomar	S. J. Bus	·	10 km (6.2 mi)	MPC · JPL
7808 Bagould	1976 GL_{8}	Bagould	April 5, 1976	El Leoncito	Cesco, M. R.	·	8.1 km (5.0 mi)	MPC · JPL
7809 Marcialangton	1979 ML_{1}	Marcialangton	June 25, 1979	Siding Spring	E. F. Helin, S. J. Bus	·	4.3 km (2.7 mi)	MPC · JPL
7810	1981 DE	—	February 26, 1981	La Silla	H. Debehogne, G. de Sanctis	V	4.5 km (2.8 mi)	MPC · JPL
7811 Zhaojiuzhang	1982 DT_{6}	Zhaojiuzhang	February 23, 1982	Xinglong	Purple Mountain	EUN	7.3 km (4.5 mi)	MPC · JPL
7812 Billward	1984 UT	Billward	October 26, 1984	Anderson Mesa	E. Bowell	·	17 km (11 mi)	MPC · JPL
7813 Anderserikson	1985 UF_{3}	Anderserikson	October 16, 1985	Kvistaberg	C.-I. Lagerkvist	EUN	6.5 km (4.0 mi)	MPC · JPL
7814	1986 CF_{2}	—	February 13, 1986	La Silla	H. Debehogne	·	19 km (12 mi)	MPC · JPL
7815 Dolon	1987 QN	Dolon	August 21, 1987	La Silla	E. W. Elst	L5	43 km (27 mi)	MPC · JPL
7816 Hanoi	1987 YA	Hanoi	December 18, 1987	Ayashi Station	M. Koishikawa	·	3.0 km (1.9 mi)	MPC · JPL
7817 Zibiturtle	1988 RH_{10}	Zibiturtle	September 14, 1988	Cerro Tololo	S. J. Bus	AST	12 km (7.5 mi)	MPC · JPL
7818 Muirhead	1990 QO	Muirhead	August 19, 1990	Palomar	E. F. Helin	·	3.9 km (2.4 mi)	MPC · JPL
7819	1990 RR_{3}	—	September 14, 1990	Palomar	H. E. Holt	·	4.9 km (3.0 mi)	MPC · JPL
7820 Ianlyon	1990 TU_{8}	Ianlyon	October 14, 1990	Kleť	A. Mrkos	NYS	3.3 km (2.1 mi)	MPC · JPL
7821	1991 AC	—	January 8, 1991	Yatsugatake	Y. Kushida, O. Muramatsu	KOR	6.3 km (3.9 mi)	MPC · JPL
7822	1991 CS	—	February 13, 1991	Siding Spring	R. H. McNaught	APO +1 km (0.62 mi) · PHA	1.6 km (0.99 mi)	MPC · JPL
7823	1991 PF_{10}	—	August 7, 1991	Palomar	H. E. Holt	·	2.6 km (1.6 mi)	MPC · JPL
7824 Lynch	1991 RM_{2}	Lynch	September 7, 1991	Palomar	E. F. Helin	·	4.9 km (3.0 mi)	MPC · JPL
7825	1991 TL_{1}	—	October 10, 1991	Palomar	J. Alu	·	4.9 km (3.0 mi)	MPC · JPL
7826 Kinugasa	1991 VO	Kinugasa	November 2, 1991	Kitami	A. Takahashi, K. Watanabe	V	3.3 km (2.1 mi)	MPC · JPL
7827	1992 QE_{2}	—	August 22, 1992	Palomar	H. E. Holt	·	8.7 km (5.4 mi)	MPC · JPL
7828 Noriyositosi	1992 SD_{13}	Noriyositosi	September 28, 1992	Kitami	M. Yanai, K. Watanabe	·	8.2 km (5.1 mi)	MPC · JPL
7829 Jaroff	1992 WY_{4}	Jaroff	November 21, 1992	Palomar	E. F. Helin	H	2.7 km (1.7 mi)	MPC · JPL
7830 Akihikotago	1993 DC_{1}	Akihikotago	February 24, 1993	Yatsugatake	Y. Kushida, O. Muramatsu	NYS	3.8 km (2.4 mi)	MPC · JPL
7831 François-Xavier	1993 FQ	François-Xavier	March 21, 1993	Palomar	E. F. Helin	·	7.3 km (4.5 mi)	MPC · JPL
7832	1993 FA_{27}	—	March 21, 1993	La Silla	UESAC	·	3.4 km (2.1 mi)	MPC · JPL
7833 Nilstamm	1993 FV_{32}	Nilstamm	March 19, 1993	La Silla	UESAC	·	5.2 km (3.2 mi)	MPC · JPL
7834	1993 JL	—	May 14, 1993	Kushiro	S. Ueda, H. Kaneda	EUN	11 km (6.8 mi)	MPC · JPL
7835 Myroncope	1993 MC	Myroncope	June 16, 1993	Catalina Station	T. B. Spahr	·	11 km (6.8 mi)	MPC · JPL
7836	1993 TG	—	October 9, 1993	Uenohara	N. Kawasato	·	11 km (6.8 mi)	MPC · JPL
7837 Mutsumi	1993 TX	Mutsumi	October 11, 1993	Yatsuka	H. Abe, S. Miyasaka	·	11 km (6.8 mi)	MPC · JPL
7838 Feliceierman	1993 WA	Feliceierman	November 16, 1993	Farra d'Isonzo	Farra d'Isonzo	·	15 km (9.3 mi)	MPC · JPL
7839	1994 ND	—	July 3, 1994	Siding Spring	R. H. McNaught	AMO +1 km (0.62 mi)	780 m (2,560 ft)	MPC · JPL
7840 Hendrika	1994 TL_{3}	Hendrika	October 5, 1994	NRC-DAO	G. C. L. Aikman	·	2.5 km (1.6 mi)	MPC · JPL
7841	1994 UE_{1}	—	October 31, 1994	Nachi-Katsuura	Y. Shimizu, T. Urata	·	8.9 km (5.5 mi)	MPC · JPL
7842 Ishitsuka	1994 XQ	Ishitsuka	December 1, 1994	Kitami	K. Endate, K. Watanabe	·	3.7 km (2.3 mi)	MPC · JPL
7843	1994 YE_{1}	—	December 22, 1994	Kushiro	S. Ueda, H. Kaneda	·	13 km (8.1 mi)	MPC · JPL
7844 Horikawa	1995 YL_{1}	Horikawa	December 21, 1995	Ōizumi	T. Kobayashi	(5)	2.8 km (1.7 mi)	MPC · JPL
7845 Mckim	1996 AC	Mckim	January 1, 1996	Ōizumi	T. Kobayashi	THB	13 km (8.1 mi)	MPC · JPL
7846 Setvák	1996 BJ	Setvák	January 16, 1996	Kleť	M. Tichý	·	3.0 km (1.9 mi)	MPC · JPL
7847 Mattiaorsi	1996 CS_{8}	Mattiaorsi	February 14, 1996	Asiago	U. Munari, M. Tombelli	HYG	9.8 km (6.1 mi)	MPC · JPL
7848 Bernasconi	1996 DF_{1}	Bernasconi	February 22, 1996	Sormano	M. Cavagna, A. Testa	·	4.9 km (3.0 mi)	MPC · JPL
7849 Janjosefrič	1996 HR	Janjosefrič	April 18, 1996	Ondřejov	P. Pravec, L. Kotková	NEM	8.4 km (5.2 mi)	MPC · JPL
7850 Buenos Aires	1996 LH	Buenos Aires	June 10, 1996	Mount Hopkins	Macri, L.	·	3.2 km (2.0 mi)	MPC · JPL
7851 Azumino	1996 YW_{2}	Azumino	December 29, 1996	Chichibu	N. Satō	·	5.0 km (3.1 mi)	MPC · JPL
7852 Itsukushima	7604 P-L	Itsukushima	October 17, 1960	Palomar	C. J. van Houten, I. van Houten-Groeneveld, T. Gehrels	·	5.5 km (3.4 mi)	MPC · JPL
7853 Confucius	2086 T-2	Confucius	September 29, 1973	Palomar	C. J. van Houten, I. van Houten-Groeneveld, T. Gehrels	·	10 km (6.2 mi)	MPC · JPL
7854 Laotse	1076 T-3	Laotse	October 17, 1977	Palomar	C. J. van Houten, I. van Houten-Groeneveld, T. Gehrels	·	3.2 km (2.0 mi)	MPC · JPL
7855 Tagore	4092 T-3	Tagore	October 16, 1977	Palomar	C. J. van Houten, I. van Houten-Groeneveld, T. Gehrels	EUN	5.7 km (3.5 mi)	MPC · JPL
7856 Viktorbykov	1975 VB_{1}	Viktorbykov	November 1, 1975	Nauchnij	T. M. Smirnova	HYG	11 km (6.8 mi)	MPC · JPL
7857 Lagerros	1978 QC_{3}	Lagerros	August 22, 1978	Mount Stromlo	C.-I. Lagerkvist	·	11 km (6.8 mi)	MPC · JPL
7858 Bolotov	1978 SB_{3}	Bolotov	September 26, 1978	Nauchnij	L. V. Zhuravleva	·	6.6 km (4.1 mi)	MPC · JPL
7859 Lhasa	1979 US	Lhasa	October 19, 1979	Kleť	A. Mrkos	·	16 km (9.9 mi)	MPC · JPL
7860 Zahnle	1980 PF	Zahnle	August 6, 1980	Anderson Mesa	E. Bowell	·	3.4 km (2.1 mi)	MPC · JPL
7861 Messenger	1981 EK_{25}	Messenger	March 2, 1981	Siding Spring	S. J. Bus	NYS	2.8 km (1.7 mi)	MPC · JPL
7862 Keikonakamura	1981 EE_{28}	Keikonakamura	March 2, 1981	Siding Spring	S. J. Bus	KOR	5.0 km (3.1 mi)	MPC · JPL
7863 Turnbull	1981 VK	Turnbull	November 2, 1981	Anderson Mesa	B. A. Skiff	THM	12 km (7.5 mi)	MPC · JPL
7864 Borucki	1982 EE	Borucki	March 14, 1982	Kleť	A. Mrkos	·	15 km (9.3 mi)	MPC · JPL
7865 Françoisgros	1982 FG_{3}	Françoisgros	March 21, 1982	La Silla	H. Debehogne	·	4.1 km (2.5 mi)	MPC · JPL
7866 Sicoli	1982 TK	Sicoli	October 13, 1982	Anderson Mesa	E. Bowell	NYS	5.6 km (3.5 mi)	MPC · JPL
7867 Burian	1984 SB_{1}	Burian	September 20, 1984	Kleť	A. Mrkos	·	2.9 km (1.8 mi)	MPC · JPL
7868 Barker	1984 UX_{2}	Barker	October 26, 1984	Anderson Mesa	E. Bowell	ADE	15 km (9.3 mi)	MPC · JPL
7869 Pradun	1987 RV_{3}	Pradun	September 2, 1987	Nauchnij	L. I. Chernykh	·	3.8 km (2.4 mi)	MPC · JPL
7870	1987 UP_{2}	—	October 25, 1987	Brorfelde	P. Jensen	·	3.9 km (2.4 mi)	MPC · JPL
7871 Tunder	1990 SW_{4}	Tunder	September 22, 1990	La Silla	E. W. Elst	·	4.6 km (2.9 mi)	MPC · JPL
7872	1990 UC	—	October 18, 1990	Oohira	T. Urata	·	3.3 km (2.1 mi)	MPC · JPL
7873 Böll	1991 AE_{3}	Böll	January 15, 1991	Tautenburg Observatory	F. Börngen	·	6.2 km (3.9 mi)	MPC · JPL
7874	1991 BE	—	January 18, 1991	Karasuyama	S. Inoda, T. Urata	·	12 km (7.5 mi)	MPC · JPL
7875	1991 ES_{1}	—	March 7, 1991	Kushiro	S. Ueda, H. Kaneda	·	15 km (9.3 mi)	MPC · JPL
7876	1991 VW_{3}	—	November 11, 1991	Kushiro	S. Ueda, H. Kaneda	·	2.9 km (1.8 mi)	MPC · JPL
7877	1992 AH_{1}	—	January 10, 1992	Uenohara	N. Kawasato	·	3.0 km (1.9 mi)	MPC · JPL
7878	1992 DZ	—	February 27, 1992	Uenohara	N. Kawasato	EUN	5.9 km (3.7 mi)	MPC · JPL
7879	1992 EX_{17}	—	March 3, 1992	La Silla	UESAC	·	5.3 km (3.3 mi)	MPC · JPL
7880	1992 OM_{7}	—	July 19, 1992	La Silla	H. Debehogne, Á. López-G.	HOF	16 km (9.9 mi)	MPC · JPL
7881 Schieferdecker	1992 RC_{7}	Schieferdecker	September 2, 1992	La Silla	E. W. Elst	KOR	6.4 km (4.0 mi)	MPC · JPL
7882	1993 FL_{6}	—	March 17, 1993	La Silla	UESAC	·	4.0 km (2.5 mi)	MPC · JPL
7883	1993 GD_{1}	—	April 15, 1993	Palomar	H. E. Holt	·	3.8 km (2.4 mi)	MPC · JPL
7884	1993 HH_{7}	—	April 24, 1993	La Silla	H. Debehogne	·	3.3 km (2.1 mi)	MPC · JPL
7885 Levine	1993 KQ_{2}	Levine	May 17, 1993	Catalina Station	T. B. Spahr	·	4.6 km (2.9 mi)	MPC · JPL
7886 Redman	1993 PE	Redman	August 12, 1993	Climenhaga	D. D. Balam	·	4.4 km (2.7 mi)	MPC · JPL
7887 Bratfest	1993 SU_{2}	Bratfest	September 18, 1993	Catalina Station	C. W. Hergenrother	MAR	11 km (6.8 mi)	MPC · JPL
7888	1993 UC	—	October 20, 1993	Siding Spring	R. H. McNaught	APO +1 km (0.62 mi) · moon	2.3 km (1.4 mi)	MPC · JPL
7889	1994 LX	—	June 15, 1994	Kitt Peak	Spacewatch	APO +1 km (0.62 mi) · moon	1.7 km (1.1 mi)	MPC · JPL
7890 Yasuofukui	1994 TC_{3}	Yasuofukui	October 2, 1994	Kitami	K. Endate, K. Watanabe	·	2.1 km (1.3 mi)	MPC · JPL
7891 Fuchie	1994 VJ_{7}	Fuchie	November 11, 1994	Nyukasa	M. Hirasawa, S. Suzuki	·	5.5 km (3.4 mi)	MPC · JPL
7892 Musamurahigashi	1994 WQ_{12}	Musamurahigashi	November 27, 1994	Nyukasa	M. Hirasawa, S. Suzuki	THM	11 km (6.8 mi)	MPC · JPL
7893	1994 XY	—	December 2, 1994	Nachi-Katsuura	Y. Shimizu, T. Urata	V	2.6 km (1.6 mi)	MPC · JPL
7894 Rogers	1994 XC_{1}	Rogers	December 6, 1994	Ōizumi	T. Kobayashi	EUN	5.3 km (3.3 mi)	MPC · JPL
7895 Kaseda	1995 DK_{1}	Kaseda	February 22, 1995	Kashihara	F. Uto	·	29 km (18 mi)	MPC · JPL
7896 Švejk	1995 EC	Švejk	March 1, 1995	Kleť	Z. Moravec	THM	15 km (9.3 mi)	MPC · JPL
7897 Bohuška	1995 EL_{1}	Bohuška	March 12, 1995	Ondřejov	L. Kotková	·	8.5 km (5.3 mi)	MPC · JPL
7898 Ohkuma	1995 XR_{1}	Ohkuma	December 15, 1995	Ōizumi	T. Kobayashi	slow	3.8 km (2.4 mi)	MPC · JPL
7899 Joya	1996 BV_{3}	Joya	January 30, 1996	Ōizumi	T. Kobayashi	·	3.9 km (2.4 mi)	MPC · JPL
7900 Portule	1996 CV_{8}	Portule	February 14, 1996	Cima Ekar	U. Munari, M. Tombelli	·	4.0 km (2.5 mi)	MPC · JPL

== 7901–8000 ==
back to top

Designation			Discovery			Properties		Ref
Permanent	Provisional	Named after	Date	Site	Discoverer(s)	Category	Diam.	Ref
7901 Konnai	1996 DP	Konnai	February 19, 1996	Oizumi	T. Kobayashi	·	3.7 km (2.3 mi)	MPC · JPL
7902 Hanff	1996 HT_{17}	Hanff	April 18, 1996	La Silla	E. W. Elst	KOR	6.9 km (4.3 mi)	MPC · JPL
7903 Albinoni	1996 HV_{24}	Albinoni	April 20, 1996	La Silla	E. W. Elst	·	6.8 km (4.2 mi)	MPC · JPL
7904 Morrow	1997 JL_{4}	Morrow	May 1, 1997	Socorro	LINEAR	·	4.3 km (2.7 mi)	MPC · JPL
7905 Juzoitami	1997 OX	Juzoitami	July 24, 1997	Kuma Kogen	A. Nakamura	EOS	10 km (6.2 mi)	MPC · JPL
7906 Melanchton	3081 P-L	Melanchton	September 24, 1960	Palomar	C. J. van Houten, I. van Houten-Groeneveld, T. Gehrels	EOS	9.5 km (5.9 mi)	MPC · JPL
7907 Erasmus	4047 P-L	Erasmus	September 24, 1960	Palomar	C. J. van Houten, I. van Houten-Groeneveld, T. Gehrels	·	7.4 km (4.6 mi)	MPC · JPL
7908 Zwingli	4192 T-1	Zwingli	March 26, 1971	Palomar	C. J. van Houten, I. van Houten-Groeneveld, T. Gehrels	·	4.0 km (2.5 mi)	MPC · JPL
7909 Ziffer	1975 SK	Ziffer	September 30, 1975	Palomar	S. J. Bus	THM	11 km (6.8 mi)	MPC · JPL
7910 Aleksola	1976 GD_{2}	Aleksola	April 1, 1976	Nauchnij	N. S. Chernykh	·	5.5 km (3.4 mi)	MPC · JPL
7911 Carlpilcher	1977 RZ_{8}	Carlpilcher	September 8, 1977	Palomar	E. Bowell	·	10 km (6.2 mi)	MPC · JPL
7912 Lapovok	1978 PO_{3}	Lapovok	August 8, 1978	Nauchnij	N. S. Chernykh	·	7.7 km (4.8 mi)	MPC · JPL
7913 Parfenov	1978 TU_{8}	Parfenov	October 9, 1978	Nauchnij	L. V. Zhuravleva	KOR	7.3 km (4.5 mi)	MPC · JPL
7914	1978 UW_{7}	—	October 27, 1978	Palomar	C. M. Olmstead	·	4.7 km (2.9 mi)	MPC · JPL
7915 Halbrook	1979 MA_{6}	Halbrook	June 25, 1979	Siding Spring	E. F. Helin, S. J. Bus	·	2.6 km (1.6 mi)	MPC · JPL
7916 Gigiproietti	1981 EN	Gigiproietti	March 1, 1981	La Silla	H. Debehogne, G. de Sanctis	·	3.6 km (2.2 mi)	MPC · JPL
7917 Hammergren	1981 EG_{5}	Hammergren	March 2, 1981	Siding Spring	S. J. Bus	·	3.2 km (2.0 mi)	MPC · JPL
7918 Berrilli	1981 EJ_{22}	Berrilli	March 2, 1981	Siding Spring	S. J. Bus	·	4.3 km (2.7 mi)	MPC · JPL
7919 Prime	1981 EZ_{27}	Prime	March 2, 1981	Siding Spring	S. J. Bus	·	5.0 km (3.1 mi)	MPC · JPL
7920	1981 XM_{2}	—	December 3, 1981	Nanking	Purple Mountain	·	9.6 km (6.0 mi)	MPC · JPL
7921 Huebner	1982 RF	Huebner	September 15, 1982	Anderson Mesa	E. Bowell	NYS	5.6 km (3.5 mi)	MPC · JPL
7922 Violalaurenti	1983 CO_{3}	Violalaurenti	February 12, 1983	La Silla	H. Debehogne, G. de Sanctis	·	15 km (9.3 mi)	MPC · JPL
7923 Chyba	1983 WJ	Chyba	November 28, 1983	Anderson Mesa	E. Bowell	KOR	6.0 km (3.7 mi)	MPC · JPL
7924 Simbirsk	1986 PW_{4}	Simbirsk	August 6, 1986	Nauchnij	N. S. Chernykh, L. I. Chernykh	THM	13 km (8.1 mi)	MPC · JPL
7925 Shelus	1986 RX_{2}	Shelus	September 6, 1986	Anderson Mesa	E. Bowell	THM	11 km (6.8 mi)	MPC · JPL
7926	1986 RD_{5}	—	September 3, 1986	La Silla	H. Debehogne	·	13 km (8.1 mi)	MPC · JPL
7927 Jamiegilmour	1986 WV_{1}	Jamiegilmour	November 29, 1986	Kleť	A. Mrkos	THM	12 km (7.5 mi)	MPC · JPL
7928 Bijaoui	1986 WM_{5}	Bijaoui	November 27, 1986	Caussols	CERGA	·	16 km (9.9 mi)	MPC · JPL
7929	1987 SK_{12}	—	September 16, 1987	La Silla	H. Debehogne	·	3.8 km (2.4 mi)	MPC · JPL
7930	1987 VD	—	November 15, 1987	Kushiro	S. Ueda, H. Kaneda	moon	3.1 km (1.9 mi)	MPC · JPL
7931 Kristianpedersen	1988 EB_{1}	Kristianpedersen	March 13, 1988	Brorfelde	P. Jensen	NYS	3.7 km (2.3 mi)	MPC · JPL
7932 Plimpton	1989 GP	Plimpton	April 7, 1989	Palomar	E. F. Helin	NYS	4.4 km (2.7 mi)	MPC · JPL
7933 Magritte	1989 GP_{4}	Magritte	April 3, 1989	La Silla	E. W. Elst	V	3.0 km (1.9 mi)	MPC · JPL
7934 Sinatra	1989 SG_{1}	Sinatra	September 26, 1989	La Silla	E. W. Elst	RAF · slow	3.4 km (2.1 mi)	MPC · JPL
7935 Beppefenoglio	1990 EZ_{5}	Beppefenoglio	March 1, 1990	La Silla	H. Debehogne	THM	13 km (8.1 mi)	MPC · JPL
7936 Mikemagee	1990 OW_{2}	Mikemagee	July 30, 1990	Palomar	H. E. Holt	·	3.4 km (2.1 mi)	MPC · JPL
7937	1990 QA_{2}	—	August 22, 1990	Palomar	H. E. Holt	·	5.7 km (3.5 mi)	MPC · JPL
7938	1990 SL_{2}	—	September 17, 1990	Palomar	H. E. Holt	·	4.1 km (2.5 mi)	MPC · JPL
7939 Asphaug	1991 AP_{1}	Asphaug	January 14, 1991	Palomar	E. F. Helin	NYS	3.0 km (1.9 mi)	MPC · JPL
7940 Erichmeyer	1991 EO_{1}	Erichmeyer	March 13, 1991	Harvard Observatory	Oak Ridge Observatory	·	7.2 km (4.5 mi)	MPC · JPL
7941	1991 NE_{1}	—	July 12, 1991	Palomar	H. E. Holt	fast	15 km (9.3 mi)	MPC · JPL
7942	1991 OK_{1}	—	July 18, 1991	La Silla	H. Debehogne	EOS	12 km (7.5 mi)	MPC · JPL
7943	1991 PQ_{12}	—	August 5, 1991	Palomar	H. E. Holt	THM · fast	11 km (6.8 mi)	MPC · JPL
7944	1991 PR_{12}	—	August 5, 1991	Palomar	H. E. Holt	·	12 km (7.5 mi)	MPC · JPL
7945 Kreisau	1991 RK_{7}	Kreisau	September 13, 1991	Tautenburg Observatory	F. Börngen, L. D. Schmadel	·	3.7 km (2.3 mi)	MPC · JPL
7946	1991 RV_{13}	—	September 13, 1991	Palomar	H. E. Holt	V	3.7 km (2.3 mi)	MPC · JPL
7947 Toland	1992 BE_{2}	Toland	January 30, 1992	La Silla	E. W. Elst	·	2.5 km (1.6 mi)	MPC · JPL
7948 Whitaker	1992 HY	Whitaker	April 24, 1992	Kitt Peak	Spacewatch	·	4.7 km (2.9 mi)	MPC · JPL
7949	1992 SU	—	September 23, 1992	Palomar	E. F. Helin	·	17 km (11 mi)	MPC · JPL
7950 Berezov	1992 SS_{26}	Berezov	September 28, 1992	Nauchnij	L. V. Zhuravleva	·	24 km (15 mi)	MPC · JPL
7951	1992 WC_{2}	—	November 18, 1992	Kushiro	S. Ueda, H. Kaneda	THM	11 km (6.8 mi)	MPC · JPL
7952	1992 XB	—	December 3, 1992	Yakiimo	Natori, A., T. Urata	·	9.6 km (6.0 mi)	MPC · JPL
7953 Kawaguchi	1993 KP	Kawaguchi	May 20, 1993	Kiyosato	S. Otomo	·	4.8 km (3.0 mi)	MPC · JPL
7954 Kitao	1993 SQ_{2}	Kitao	September 19, 1993	Kitami	K. Endate, K. Watanabe	EUN · slow	5.8 km (3.6 mi)	MPC · JPL
7955 Ogiwara	1993 WE	Ogiwara	November 18, 1993	Oohira	T. Urata	·	6.0 km (3.7 mi)	MPC · JPL
7956 Yaji	1993 YH	Yaji	December 17, 1993	Oizumi	T. Kobayashi	THM	11 km (6.8 mi)	MPC · JPL
7957 Antonella	1994 BT	Antonella	January 17, 1994	Cima Ekar	A. Boattini, M. Tombelli	GEF	5.1 km (3.2 mi)	MPC · JPL
7958 Leakey	1994 LE_{3}	Leakey	June 5, 1994	Palomar	C. S. Shoemaker, E. M. Shoemaker	H · moon	2.9 km (1.8 mi)	MPC · JPL
7959 Alysecherri	1994 PK	Alysecherri	August 2, 1994	Catalina Station	C. W. Hergenrother	H	2.7 km (1.7 mi)	MPC · JPL
7960 Condorcet	1994 PW_{16}	Condorcet	August 10, 1994	La Silla	E. W. Elst	·	4.2 km (2.6 mi)	MPC · JPL
7961 Ercolepoli	1994 TD_{2}	Ercolepoli	October 10, 1994	Colleverde	V. S. Casulli	·	3.4 km (2.1 mi)	MPC · JPL
7962	1994 WG_{3}	—	November 28, 1994	Kushiro	S. Ueda, H. Kaneda	·	2.6 km (1.6 mi)	MPC · JPL
7963 Falcinelli	1995 CA	Falcinelli	February 1, 1995	Stroncone	Santa Lucia	EUN	5.7 km (3.5 mi)	MPC · JPL
7964	1995 DD_{2}	—	February 23, 1995	Nachi-Katsuura	Y. Shimizu, T. Urata	·	8.0 km (5.0 mi)	MPC · JPL
7965 Katsuhiko	1996 BD_{1}	Katsuhiko	January 17, 1996	Kitami	K. Endate, K. Watanabe	·	21 km (13 mi)	MPC · JPL
7966 Richardbaum	1996 DA	Richardbaum	February 18, 1996	Oizumi	T. Kobayashi	NYS	3.8 km (2.4 mi)	MPC · JPL
7967 Beny	1996 DV_{2}	Beny	February 28, 1996	Kleť	Z. Moravec	·	3.2 km (2.0 mi)	MPC · JPL
7968 Elst–Pizarro	1996 N_{2}	Elst–Pizarro	July 14, 1996	La Silla	E. W. Elst, G. Pizarro	THM · Comet (133P)	3.2 km (2.0 mi)	MPC · JPL
7969	1997 RP_{3}	—	September 5, 1997	Nachi-Katsuura	Y. Shimizu, T. Urata	THM	13 km (8.1 mi)	MPC · JPL
7970 Lichtenberg	6065 P-L	Lichtenberg	September 24, 1960	Palomar	C. J. van Houten, I. van Houten-Groeneveld, T. Gehrels	·	6.2 km (3.9 mi)	MPC · JPL
7971 Meckbach	9002 P-L	Meckbach	October 17, 1960	Palomar	C. J. van Houten, I. van Houten-Groeneveld, T. Gehrels	EUN	5.5 km (3.4 mi)	MPC · JPL
7972 Mariotti	1174 T-1	Mariotti	March 25, 1971	Palomar	C. J. van Houten, I. van Houten-Groeneveld, T. Gehrels	THM	9.1 km (5.7 mi)	MPC · JPL
7973 Koppeschaar	1344 T-2	Koppeschaar	September 29, 1973	Palomar	C. J. van Houten, I. van Houten-Groeneveld, T. Gehrels	·	3.6 km (2.2 mi)	MPC · JPL
7974 Vermeesch	2218 T-2	Vermeesch	September 29, 1973	Palomar	C. J. van Houten, I. van Houten-Groeneveld, T. Gehrels	·	2.8 km (1.7 mi)	MPC · JPL
7975	1974 FD	—	March 22, 1974	Cerro El Roble	C. Torres	EOS	11 km (6.8 mi)	MPC · JPL
7976 Pinigin	1977 QT_{2}	Pinigin	August 21, 1977	Nauchnij	N. S. Chernykh	·	3.7 km (2.3 mi)	MPC · JPL
7977	1977 QQ_{5}	—	August 21, 1977	Siding Spring	R. H. McNaught	AMO +1 km (0.62 mi)	3.3 km (2.1 mi)	MPC · JPL
7978 Niknesterov	1978 SR_{4}	Niknesterov	September 27, 1978	Nauchnij	L. I. Chernykh	·	3.3 km (2.1 mi)	MPC · JPL
7979 Pozharskij	1978 SV_{7}	Pozharskij	September 26, 1978	Nauchnij	L. V. Zhuravleva	·	12 km (7.5 mi)	MPC · JPL
7980 Senkevich	1978 TD_{2}	Senkevich	October 3, 1978	Nauchnij	N. S. Chernykh	·	4.3 km (2.7 mi)	MPC · JPL
7981 Katieoakman	1978 VL_{10}	Katieoakman	November 7, 1978	Palomar	E. F. Helin, S. J. Bus	·	5.7 km (3.5 mi)	MPC · JPL
7982 Timmartin	1979 MX_{5}	Timmartin	June 25, 1979	Siding Spring	E. F. Helin, S. J. Bus	·	3.0 km (1.9 mi)	MPC · JPL
7983 Festin	1980 FY	Festin	March 16, 1980	La Silla	C.-I. Lagerkvist	·	4.3 km (2.7 mi)	MPC · JPL
7984 Marius	1980 SM	Marius	September 29, 1980	Kleť	Z. Vávrová	·	10 km (6.2 mi)	MPC · JPL
7985 Nedelcu	1981 EK_{10}	Nedelcu	March 1, 1981	Siding Spring	S. J. Bus	·	3.8 km (2.4 mi)	MPC · JPL
7986 Romania	1981 EG_{15}	Romania	March 1, 1981	Siding Spring	S. J. Bus	·	3.5 km (2.2 mi)	MPC · JPL
7987 Walshkevin	1981 EV_{22}	Walshkevin	March 2, 1981	Siding Spring	S. J. Bus	·	8.2 km (5.1 mi)	MPC · JPL
7988 Pucacco	1981 EX_{30}	Pucacco	March 2, 1981	Siding Spring	S. J. Bus	NYS	3.5 km (2.2 mi)	MPC · JPL
7989 Pernadavide	1981 EW_{41}	Pernadavide	March 2, 1981	Siding Spring	S. J. Bus	MAS	2.2 km (1.4 mi)	MPC · JPL
7990	1981 SN_{1}	—	September 26, 1981	Anderson Mesa	N. G. Thomas	·	8.7 km (5.4 mi)	MPC · JPL
7991 Kaguyahime	1981 UT_{7}	Kaguyahime	October 30, 1981	Kiso	H. Kosai, K. Furukawa	THM	14 km (8.7 mi)	MPC · JPL
7992 Yozan	1981 WC	Yozan	November 28, 1981	Tōkai	T. Furuta	·	16 km (9.9 mi)	MPC · JPL
7993 Johnbridges	1982 UD_{2}	Johnbridges	October 16, 1982	Kleť	A. Mrkos	KOR	8.5 km (5.3 mi)	MPC · JPL
7994 Bethellen	1983 CQ_{2}	Bethellen	February 15, 1983	Anderson Mesa	E. Bowell	slow	17 km (11 mi)	MPC · JPL
7995 Khvorostovsky	1983 PX	Khvorostovsky	August 4, 1983	Nauchnij	L. G. Karachkina	·	7.5 km (4.7 mi)	MPC · JPL
7996 Vedernikov	1983 RX_{3}	Vedernikov	September 1, 1983	Nauchnij	L. G. Karachkina	·	8.7 km (5.4 mi)	MPC · JPL
7997	1985 CN_{1}	—	February 13, 1985	La Silla	H. Debehogne	NYS	3.7 km (2.3 mi)	MPC · JPL
7998 Gonczi	1985 JK	Gonczi	May 15, 1985	Anderson Mesa	E. Bowell	·	5.2 km (3.2 mi)	MPC · JPL
7999 Nesvorný	1986 RA_{3}	Nesvorný	September 11, 1986	Anderson Mesa	E. Bowell	·	25 km (16 mi)	MPC · JPL
8000 Isaac Newton	1986 RL_{5}	Isaac Newton	September 5, 1986	La Silla	H. Debehogne	EOS	11 km (6.8 mi)	MPC · JPL

back to top

== See also ==
- Meanings of minor-planet names: 7001–8000
