= List of minor planets: 46001–47000 =

The following is a partial list of minor planets, running from minor-planet number 46001 through 47000, inclusive. The primary data for this and other partial lists is based on JPL's "Small-Body Orbital Elements" and data available from the Minor Planet Center. Critical list information is also provided by the MPC, unless otherwise specified from Lowell Observatory. A detailed description of the table's columns and additional sources are given on the main page including a complete list of every page in this series, and a statistical break-up on the dynamical classification of minor planets.

Also see the summary list of all named bodies in numerical and alphabetical order, and the corresponding naming citations for the number range of this particular list. New namings may only be added to this list after official publication, as the preannouncement of names is condemned by the Working Group for Small Bodies Nomenclature of the International Astronomical Union.

Near-Earth obj.	MBA (inner)	MBA (outer)	Centaur
Mars-crosser	MBA (middle)	Jupiter trojan	Trans-Neptunian obj.
Unclassified

== 46001–46100 ==
Designation			Discovery			Properties		Ref
Permanent	Provisional	Named after	Date	Site	Discoverer(s)	Category	Diam.	Ref
46001	2001 CG_{1}	—	February 1, 2001	Socorro	LINEAR	·	2.1 km	MPC · JPL
46002	2001 CB_{3}	—	February 1, 2001	Socorro	LINEAR	V	1.5 km	MPC · JPL
46003	2001 CF_{3}	—	February 1, 2001	Socorro	LINEAR	·	2.5 km	MPC · JPL
46004	2001 CF_{4}	—	February 1, 2001	Socorro	LINEAR	PHO	3.7 km	MPC · JPL
46005	2001 CR_{7}	—	February 1, 2001	Socorro	LINEAR	·	7.0 km	MPC · JPL
46006	2001 CB_{11}	—	February 1, 2001	Socorro	LINEAR	NYS	2.8 km	MPC · JPL
46007	2001 CG_{12}	—	February 1, 2001	Socorro	LINEAR	·	1.8 km	MPC · JPL
46008	2001 CY_{12}	—	February 1, 2001	Socorro	LINEAR	EUN ·	6.0 km	MPC · JPL
46009	2001 CE_{13}	—	February 1, 2001	Socorro	LINEAR	·	1.9 km	MPC · JPL
46010	2001 CU_{16}	—	February 1, 2001	Socorro	LINEAR	·	2.0 km	MPC · JPL
46011	2001 CM_{19}	—	February 2, 2001	Socorro	LINEAR	AGN	2.8 km	MPC · JPL
46012	2001 CM_{26}	—	February 1, 2001	Socorro	LINEAR	·	6.8 km	MPC · JPL
46013	2001 CP_{26}	—	February 1, 2001	Socorro	LINEAR	EOS	5.3 km	MPC · JPL
46014	2001 CF_{27}	—	February 2, 2001	Anderson Mesa	LONEOS	·	4.2 km	MPC · JPL
46015	2001 CJ_{36}	—	February 15, 2001	Oizumi	T. Kobayashi	V	2.0 km	MPC · JPL
46016	2001 CP_{41}	—	February 15, 2001	Črni Vrh	Mikuž, H.	·	2.5 km	MPC · JPL
46017	2001 DP_{3}	—	February 16, 2001	Socorro	LINEAR	·	7.0 km	MPC · JPL
46018	2001 DX_{6}	—	February 16, 2001	Črni Vrh	Matičič, S.	·	4.1 km	MPC · JPL
46019	2001 DT_{9}	—	February 16, 2001	Socorro	LINEAR	·	3.1 km	MPC · JPL
46020	2001 DL_{11}	—	February 17, 2001	Socorro	LINEAR	·	1.7 km	MPC · JPL
46021	2001 DZ_{14}	—	February 17, 2001	Črni Vrh	Matičič, S.	·	2.9 km	MPC · JPL
46022	2001 DE_{16}	—	February 16, 2001	Socorro	LINEAR	·	3.4 km	MPC · JPL
46023	2001 DN_{16}	—	February 16, 2001	Socorro	LINEAR	·	2.1 km	MPC · JPL
46024	2001 DC_{18}	—	February 16, 2001	Socorro	LINEAR	·	10 km	MPC · JPL
46025	2001 DQ_{18}	—	February 16, 2001	Socorro	LINEAR	·	2.5 km	MPC · JPL
46026	2001 DJ_{20}	—	February 16, 2001	Socorro	LINEAR	·	3.1 km	MPC · JPL
46027	2001 DG_{21}	—	February 16, 2001	Socorro	LINEAR	·	8.2 km	MPC · JPL
46028	2001 DT_{21}	—	February 16, 2001	Socorro	LINEAR	·	3.1 km	MPC · JPL
46029	2001 DF_{22}	—	February 16, 2001	Socorro	LINEAR	EUN	2.8 km	MPC · JPL
46030	2001 DQ_{25}	—	February 17, 2001	Socorro	LINEAR	NYS	3.5 km	MPC · JPL
46031	2001 DB_{29}	—	February 17, 2001	Socorro	LINEAR	NYS	3.1 km	MPC · JPL
46032	2001 DM_{29}	—	February 17, 2001	Socorro	LINEAR	·	1.6 km	MPC · JPL
46033	2001 DG_{31}	—	February 17, 2001	Socorro	LINEAR	·	3.0 km	MPC · JPL
46034	2001 DR_{31}	—	February 17, 2001	Socorro	LINEAR	·	4.7 km	MPC · JPL
46035	2001 DM_{32}	—	February 17, 2001	Socorro	LINEAR	·	2.2 km	MPC · JPL
46036	2001 DS_{32}	—	February 17, 2001	Socorro	LINEAR	·	1.6 km	MPC · JPL
46037	2001 DF_{33}	—	February 17, 2001	Socorro	LINEAR	PAL	6.9 km	MPC · JPL
46038	2001 DH_{33}	—	February 17, 2001	Socorro	LINEAR	·	1.9 km	MPC · JPL
46039	2001 DW_{39}	—	February 19, 2001	Socorro	LINEAR	·	2.0 km	MPC · JPL
46040	2001 DT_{44}	—	February 19, 2001	Socorro	LINEAR	THM	7.5 km	MPC · JPL
46041	2001 DX_{46}	—	February 19, 2001	Socorro	LINEAR	EUN	3.0 km	MPC · JPL
46042	2001 DK_{54}	—	February 21, 2001	Desert Beaver	W. K. Y. Yeung	·	3.1 km	MPC · JPL
46043	2001 DR_{64}	—	February 19, 2001	Socorro	LINEAR	·	3.2 km	MPC · JPL
46044	2001 DP_{68}	—	February 19, 2001	Socorro	LINEAR	·	2.8 km	MPC · JPL
46045	2001 DU_{68}	—	February 19, 2001	Socorro	LINEAR	fast	9.3 km	MPC · JPL
46046	2001 DM_{70}	—	February 19, 2001	Socorro	LINEAR	V	1.6 km	MPC · JPL
46047	2001 DN_{70}	—	February 19, 2001	Socorro	LINEAR	·	7.0 km	MPC · JPL
46048	2001 DJ_{71}	—	February 19, 2001	Socorro	LINEAR	NYS	3.2 km	MPC · JPL
46049	2001 DL_{73}	—	February 19, 2001	Socorro	LINEAR	·	3.9 km	MPC · JPL
46050	2001 DM_{74}	—	February 19, 2001	Socorro	LINEAR	·	6.7 km	MPC · JPL
46051	2001 DQ_{74}	—	February 19, 2001	Socorro	LINEAR	·	3.2 km	MPC · JPL
46052	2001 DD_{76}	—	February 20, 2001	Socorro	LINEAR	·	2.1 km	MPC · JPL
46053 Davidpatterson	2001 DB_{77}	Davidpatterson	February 21, 2001	Junk Bond	D. Healy	·	1.5 km	MPC · JPL
46054	2001 DC_{80}	—	February 22, 2001	Haleakala	NEAT	·	5.9 km	MPC · JPL
46055	2001 DA_{83}	—	February 22, 2001	Kitt Peak	Spacewatch	·	2.9 km	MPC · JPL
46056	2001 DD_{87}	—	February 23, 2001	Haleakala	NEAT	·	3.7 km	MPC · JPL
46057	2001 DT_{87}	—	February 21, 2001	Anderson Mesa	LONEOS	(5)	3.3 km	MPC · JPL
46058	2001 DE_{88}	—	February 24, 2001	Haleakala	NEAT	·	2.5 km	MPC · JPL
46059	2001 DJ_{88}	—	February 25, 2001	Haleakala	NEAT	·	2.0 km	MPC · JPL
46060	2001 DL_{88}	—	February 26, 2001	Cerro Tololo	Deep Lens Survey	·	4.0 km	MPC · JPL
46061	2001 DC_{90}	—	February 22, 2001	Socorro	LINEAR	EUN	3.0 km	MPC · JPL
46062	2001 DT_{91}	—	February 20, 2001	Haleakala	NEAT	ADE	8.2 km	MPC · JPL
46063	2001 DV_{91}	—	February 20, 2001	Kitt Peak	Spacewatch	·	3.5 km	MPC · JPL
46064	2001 DH_{92}	—	February 20, 2001	Haleakala	NEAT	fast	6.5 km	MPC · JPL
46065	2001 DB_{93}	—	February 19, 2001	Anderson Mesa	LONEOS	·	2.4 km	MPC · JPL
46066	2001 DV_{95}	—	February 17, 2001	Socorro	LINEAR	NYS	2.8 km	MPC · JPL
46067	2001 DY_{99}	—	February 17, 2001	Socorro	LINEAR	·	9.9 km	MPC · JPL
46068	2001 DM_{100}	—	February 16, 2001	Kitt Peak	Spacewatch	·	1.5 km	MPC · JPL
46069	2001 DY_{100}	—	February 16, 2001	Socorro	LINEAR	·	3.3 km	MPC · JPL
46070	2001 DV_{101}	—	February 16, 2001	Socorro	LINEAR	·	1.9 km	MPC · JPL
46071	2001 DQ_{103}	—	February 16, 2001	Haleakala	NEAT	·	5.6 km	MPC · JPL
46072	2001 EJ	—	March 2, 2001	Desert Beaver	W. K. Y. Yeung	·	11 km	MPC · JPL
46073	2001 EA_{1}	—	March 1, 2001	Socorro	LINEAR	V	1.7 km	MPC · JPL
46074	2001 EK_{1}	—	March 1, 2001	Socorro	LINEAR	CLO	7.1 km	MPC · JPL
46075	2001 EK_{3}	—	March 2, 2001	Anderson Mesa	LONEOS	·	2.3 km	MPC · JPL
46076 Robertschottland	2001 EH_{4}	Robertschottland	March 2, 2001	Anderson Mesa	LONEOS	HOF	6.3 km	MPC · JPL
46077	2001 EJ_{5}	—	March 2, 2001	Anderson Mesa	LONEOS	·	5.4 km	MPC · JPL
46078	2001 ET_{6}	—	March 2, 2001	Anderson Mesa	LONEOS	·	4.1 km	MPC · JPL
46079	2001 EB_{7}	—	March 2, 2001	Anderson Mesa	LONEOS	·	4.4 km	MPC · JPL
46080	2001 EV_{9}	—	March 2, 2001	Anderson Mesa	LONEOS	·	2.7 km	MPC · JPL
46081	2001 EB_{10}	—	March 2, 2001	Anderson Mesa	LONEOS	·	6.8 km	MPC · JPL
46082	2001 EC_{10}	—	March 2, 2001	Anderson Mesa	LONEOS	·	3.3 km	MPC · JPL
46083 Aaronkingery	2001 ED_{10}	Aaronkingery	March 2, 2001	Anderson Mesa	LONEOS	CLO	8.0 km	MPC · JPL
46084	2001 EU_{10}	—	March 2, 2001	Haleakala	NEAT	·	4.6 km	MPC · JPL
46085	2001 EL_{11}	—	March 2, 2001	Haleakala	NEAT	MAR	3.0 km	MPC · JPL
46086	2001 EN_{11}	—	March 2, 2001	Haleakala	NEAT	·	8.3 km	MPC · JPL
46087	2001 EQ_{11}	—	March 2, 2001	Haleakala	NEAT	EUN	4.8 km	MPC · JPL
46088	2001 EO_{12}	—	March 4, 2001	Socorro	LINEAR	·	7.1 km	MPC · JPL
46089	2001 EC_{14}	—	March 15, 2001	Socorro	LINEAR	EUN	3.8 km	MPC · JPL
46090	2001 EJ_{15}	—	March 15, 2001	Kitt Peak	Spacewatch	·	2.1 km	MPC · JPL
46091	2001 ES_{15}	—	March 15, 2001	Oizumi	T. Kobayashi	·	5.7 km	MPC · JPL
46092	2001 EP_{16}	—	March 15, 2001	Haleakala	NEAT	·	3.2 km	MPC · JPL
46093	2001 EL_{17}	—	March 15, 2001	Socorro	LINEAR	BRU	7.7 km	MPC · JPL
46094	2001 EX_{21}	—	March 15, 2001	Anderson Mesa	LONEOS	·	6.3 km	MPC · JPL
46095 Frédérickoby	2001 ER_{25}	Frédérickoby	March 15, 2001	Vicques	M. Ory	·	6.7 km	MPC · JPL
46096	2001 FB	—	March 16, 2001	Socorro	LINEAR	H	2.0 km	MPC · JPL
46097	2001 FN_{1}	—	March 19, 2001	Reedy Creek	J. Broughton	·	3.8 km	MPC · JPL
46098	2001 FH_{2}	—	March 18, 2001	Socorro	LINEAR	·	1.5 km	MPC · JPL
46099	2001 FD_{5}	—	March 18, 2001	Socorro	LINEAR	PHO	3.1 km	MPC · JPL
46100	2001 FD_{6}	—	March 19, 2001	Socorro	LINEAR	(3460)	6.3 km	MPC · JPL

== 46101–46200 ==
back to top

Designation			Discovery			Properties		Ref
Permanent	Provisional	Named after	Date	Site	Discoverer(s)	Category	Diam.	Ref
46101	2001 FK_{8}	—	March 18, 2001	Socorro	LINEAR	·	11 km	MPC · JPL
46102	2001 FR_{9}	—	March 19, 2001	Anderson Mesa	LONEOS	EOS	5.5 km	MPC · JPL
46103	2001 FQ_{12}	—	March 19, 2001	Anderson Mesa	LONEOS	·	7.1 km	MPC · JPL
46104	2001 FR_{12}	—	March 19, 2001	Anderson Mesa	LONEOS	·	6.3 km	MPC · JPL
46105	2001 FQ_{14}	—	March 19, 2001	Anderson Mesa	LONEOS	VER	6.3 km	MPC · JPL
46106	2001 FA_{16}	—	March 19, 2001	Anderson Mesa	LONEOS	·	3.2 km	MPC · JPL
46107	2001 FP_{17}	—	March 19, 2001	Anderson Mesa	LONEOS	V	2.1 km	MPC · JPL
46108	2001 FW_{18}	—	March 19, 2001	Anderson Mesa	LONEOS	·	2.1 km	MPC · JPL
46109	2001 FG_{23}	—	March 21, 2001	Anderson Mesa	LONEOS	·	10 km	MPC · JPL
46110 Altheamoorhead	2001 FK_{23}	Altheamoorhead	March 21, 2001	Anderson Mesa	LONEOS	·	2.8 km	MPC · JPL
46111	2001 FR_{24}	—	March 17, 2001	Socorro	LINEAR	EUN	4.0 km	MPC · JPL
46112	2001 FA_{26}	—	March 18, 2001	Socorro	LINEAR	·	6.9 km	MPC · JPL
46113	2001 FT_{29}	—	March 18, 2001	Haleakala	NEAT	MAR	3.5 km	MPC · JPL
46114	2001 FX_{29}	—	March 20, 2001	Haleakala	NEAT	EUN	3.5 km	MPC · JPL
46115	2001 FP_{33}	—	March 18, 2001	Socorro	LINEAR	EOS	6.2 km	MPC · JPL
46116	2001 FY_{33}	—	March 18, 2001	Socorro	LINEAR	·	3.1 km	MPC · JPL
46117	2001 FD_{34}	—	March 18, 2001	Socorro	LINEAR	·	1.8 km	MPC · JPL
46118	2001 FL_{34}	—	March 18, 2001	Socorro	LINEAR	·	2.3 km	MPC · JPL
46119	2001 FU_{34}	—	March 18, 2001	Socorro	LINEAR	NYS	2.7 km	MPC · JPL
46120	2001 FY_{34}	—	March 18, 2001	Socorro	LINEAR	·	3.6 km	MPC · JPL
46121	2001 FB_{36}	—	March 18, 2001	Socorro	LINEAR	·	6.3 km	MPC · JPL
46122	2001 FJ_{37}	—	March 18, 2001	Socorro	LINEAR	·	3.1 km	MPC · JPL
46123	2001 FW_{37}	—	March 18, 2001	Socorro	LINEAR	·	3.4 km	MPC · JPL
46124	2001 FU_{40}	—	March 18, 2001	Socorro	LINEAR	·	3.0 km	MPC · JPL
46125	2001 FB_{43}	—	March 18, 2001	Socorro	LINEAR	·	6.3 km	MPC · JPL
46126	2001 FN_{45}	—	March 18, 2001	Socorro	LINEAR	·	3.8 km	MPC · JPL
46127	2001 FS_{45}	—	March 18, 2001	Socorro	LINEAR	·	3.7 km	MPC · JPL
46128	2001 FU_{45}	—	March 18, 2001	Socorro	LINEAR	·	3.9 km	MPC · JPL
46129	2001 FP_{46}	—	March 18, 2001	Socorro	LINEAR	·	3.7 km	MPC · JPL
46130	2001 FQ_{46}	—	March 18, 2001	Socorro	LINEAR	WIT	3.2 km	MPC · JPL
46131	2001 FW_{47}	—	March 18, 2001	Socorro	LINEAR	·	3.1 km	MPC · JPL
46132	2001 FG_{49}	—	March 18, 2001	Socorro	LINEAR	·	2.9 km	MPC · JPL
46133	2001 FT_{50}	—	March 18, 2001	Socorro	LINEAR	·	2.9 km	MPC · JPL
46134	2001 FH_{53}	—	March 18, 2001	Socorro	LINEAR	KOR	3.8 km	MPC · JPL
46135	2001 FF_{56}	—	March 23, 2001	Socorro	LINEAR	GEF	4.4 km	MPC · JPL
46136	2001 FH_{56}	—	March 23, 2001	Socorro	LINEAR	·	7.7 km	MPC · JPL
46137	2001 FN_{56}	—	March 23, 2001	Socorro	LINEAR	·	12 km	MPC · JPL
46138	2001 FR_{56}	—	March 21, 2001	Anderson Mesa	LONEOS	·	7.5 km	MPC · JPL
46139	2001 FV_{56}	—	March 21, 2001	Anderson Mesa	LONEOS	·	5.3 km	MPC · JPL
46140	2001 FU_{57}	—	March 21, 2001	Socorro	LINEAR	GEF	4.4 km	MPC · JPL
46141	2001 FY_{57}	—	March 21, 2001	Anderson Mesa	LONEOS	·	7.8 km	MPC · JPL
46142	2001 FN_{58}	—	March 24, 2001	Haleakala	NEAT	·	8.5 km	MPC · JPL
46143	2001 FO_{60}	—	March 19, 2001	Socorro	LINEAR	·	8.0 km	MPC · JPL
46144	2001 FB_{63}	—	March 19, 2001	Socorro	LINEAR	·	2.2 km	MPC · JPL
46145	2001 FC_{63}	—	March 19, 2001	Socorro	LINEAR	·	3.5 km	MPC · JPL
46146	2001 FP_{64}	—	March 19, 2001	Socorro	LINEAR	·	4.7 km	MPC · JPL
46147	2001 FK_{66}	—	March 19, 2001	Socorro	LINEAR	·	4.7 km	MPC · JPL
46148	2001 FC_{67}	—	March 19, 2001	Socorro	LINEAR	·	3.7 km	MPC · JPL
46149	2001 FJ_{67}	—	March 19, 2001	Socorro	LINEAR	·	10 km	MPC · JPL
46150	2001 FY_{67}	—	March 19, 2001	Socorro	LINEAR	MAR	2.5 km	MPC · JPL
46151	2001 FS_{68}	—	March 19, 2001	Socorro	LINEAR	EOS	6.9 km	MPC · JPL
46152	2001 FV_{68}	—	March 19, 2001	Socorro	LINEAR	·	2.7 km	MPC · JPL
46153	2001 FH_{69}	—	March 19, 2001	Socorro	LINEAR	·	2.4 km	MPC · JPL
46154	2001 FL_{70}	—	March 19, 2001	Socorro	LINEAR	·	11 km	MPC · JPL
46155	2001 FS_{70}	—	March 19, 2001	Socorro	LINEAR	·	2.7 km	MPC · JPL
46156	2001 FR_{72}	—	March 19, 2001	Socorro	LINEAR	MRX	3.0 km	MPC · JPL
46157	2001 FZ_{72}	—	March 19, 2001	Socorro	LINEAR	·	4.3 km	MPC · JPL
46158	2001 FC_{73}	—	March 19, 2001	Socorro	LINEAR	EUN	3.7 km	MPC · JPL
46159	2001 FO_{73}	—	March 19, 2001	Socorro	LINEAR	·	7.4 km	MPC · JPL
46160	2001 FE_{78}	—	March 19, 2001	Socorro	LINEAR	·	11 km	MPC · JPL
46161	2001 FK_{78}	—	March 19, 2001	Socorro	LINEAR	·	4.1 km	MPC · JPL
46162	2001 FM_{78}	—	March 19, 2001	Socorro	LINEAR	MAR	2.9 km	MPC · JPL
46163	2001 FV_{79}	—	March 21, 2001	Socorro	LINEAR	·	4.3 km	MPC · JPL
46164	2001 FZ_{79}	—	March 21, 2001	Socorro	LINEAR	·	3.8 km	MPC · JPL
46165	2001 FF_{80}	—	March 21, 2001	Socorro	LINEAR	CLO	5.8 km	MPC · JPL
46166	2001 FF_{82}	—	March 23, 2001	Socorro	LINEAR	GEF	3.1 km	MPC · JPL
46167	2001 FX_{83}	—	March 26, 2001	Kitt Peak	Spacewatch	·	2.0 km	MPC · JPL
46168	2001 FK_{86}	—	March 27, 2001	Desert Beaver	W. K. Y. Yeung	·	6.5 km	MPC · JPL
46169	2001 FY_{87}	—	March 21, 2001	Anderson Mesa	LONEOS	·	5.5 km	MPC · JPL
46170	2001 FG_{90}	—	March 23, 2001	Socorro	LINEAR	·	5.5 km	MPC · JPL
46171	2001 FV_{90}	—	March 26, 2001	Socorro	LINEAR	·	5.0 km	MPC · JPL
46172	2001 FB_{92}	—	March 16, 2001	Socorro	LINEAR	·	3.9 km	MPC · JPL
46173	2001 FQ_{92}	—	March 16, 2001	Socorro	LINEAR	EUN	3.6 km	MPC · JPL
46174	2001 FB_{93}	—	March 16, 2001	Socorro	LINEAR	·	4.6 km	MPC · JPL
46175	2001 FR_{93}	—	March 16, 2001	Socorro	LINEAR	V	1.4 km	MPC · JPL
46176	2001 FX_{94}	—	March 16, 2001	Socorro	LINEAR	·	2.8 km	MPC · JPL
46177	2001 FW_{97}	—	March 16, 2001	Socorro	LINEAR	·	11 km	MPC · JPL
46178	2001 FA_{98}	—	March 16, 2001	Socorro	LINEAR	·	8.5 km	MPC · JPL
46179	2001 FD_{98}	—	March 16, 2001	Socorro	LINEAR	GEF	3.5 km	MPC · JPL
46180	2001 FX_{101}	—	March 17, 2001	Socorro	LINEAR	·	2.2 km	MPC · JPL
46181	2001 FM_{113}	—	March 18, 2001	Haleakala	NEAT	·	3.7 km	MPC · JPL
46182	2001 FD_{119}	—	March 20, 2001	Haleakala	NEAT	·	1.8 km	MPC · JPL
46183	2001 FH_{119}	—	March 20, 2001	Haleakala	NEAT	EUN	3.8 km	MPC · JPL
46184	2001 FM_{120}	—	March 26, 2001	Socorro	LINEAR	·	3.9 km	MPC · JPL
46185	2001 FF_{124}	—	March 23, 2001	Anderson Mesa	LONEOS	·	4.1 km	MPC · JPL
46186	2001 FS_{124}	—	March 29, 2001	Anderson Mesa	LONEOS	NYS	2.2 km	MPC · JPL
46187	2001 FW_{126}	—	March 26, 2001	Socorro	LINEAR	EUN	4.1 km	MPC · JPL
46188	2001 FW_{134}	—	March 21, 2001	Anderson Mesa	LONEOS	EUN	3.0 km	MPC · JPL
46189	2001 FN_{135}	—	March 21, 2001	Socorro	LINEAR	·	7.1 km	MPC · JPL
46190	2001 FV_{135}	—	March 21, 2001	Socorro	LINEAR	·	5.8 km	MPC · JPL
46191	2001 FS_{140}	—	March 22, 2001	Kitt Peak	Spacewatch	·	6.6 km	MPC · JPL
46192	2001 FG_{141}	—	March 23, 2001	Anderson Mesa	LONEOS	·	2.7 km	MPC · JPL
46193	2001 FW_{141}	—	March 23, 2001	Anderson Mesa	LONEOS	KOR	3.3 km	MPC · JPL
46194	2001 FR_{143}	—	March 23, 2001	Anderson Mesa	LONEOS	V	1.9 km	MPC · JPL
46195	2001 FM_{144}	—	March 23, 2001	Anderson Mesa	LONEOS	HOF	6.5 km	MPC · JPL
46196	2001 FH_{145}	—	March 23, 2001	Haleakala	NEAT	·	7.7 km	MPC · JPL
46197	2001 FK_{146}	—	March 24, 2001	Anderson Mesa	LONEOS	·	3.9 km	MPC · JPL
46198	2001 FS_{147}	—	March 24, 2001	Anderson Mesa	LONEOS	MAR	3.2 km	MPC · JPL
46199	2001 FX_{147}	—	March 24, 2001	Anderson Mesa	LONEOS	·	2.9 km	MPC · JPL
46200	2001 FE_{148}	—	March 24, 2001	Anderson Mesa	LONEOS	·	3.0 km	MPC · JPL

== 46201–46300 ==
back to top

Designation			Discovery			Properties		Ref
Permanent	Provisional	Named after	Date	Site	Discoverer(s)	Category	Diam.	Ref
46201	2001 FS_{148}	—	March 24, 2001	Anderson Mesa	LONEOS	·	3.7 km	MPC · JPL
46202	2001 FR_{151}	—	March 24, 2001	Haleakala	NEAT	·	3.5 km	MPC · JPL
46203	2001 FB_{153}	—	March 26, 2001	Socorro	LINEAR	GEF	2.7 km	MPC · JPL
46204	2001 FC_{155}	—	March 26, 2001	Socorro	LINEAR	·	8.4 km	MPC · JPL
46205	2001 FV_{155}	—	March 26, 2001	Socorro	LINEAR	MAR	3.4 km	MPC · JPL
46206	2001 FS_{156}	—	March 26, 2001	Haleakala	NEAT	·	3.3 km	MPC · JPL
46207	2001 FF_{158}	—	March 27, 2001	Anderson Mesa	LONEOS	·	2.0 km	MPC · JPL
46208 Gicquel	2001 FB_{160}	Gicquel	March 29, 2001	Anderson Mesa	LONEOS	THM	6.5 km	MPC · JPL
46209	2001 FK_{160}	—	March 29, 2001	Haleakala	NEAT	slow	9.9 km	MPC · JPL
46210	2001 FX_{160}	—	March 29, 2001	Haleakala	NEAT	·	3.3 km	MPC · JPL
46211	2001 FO_{161}	—	March 29, 2001	Haleakala	NEAT	EOS	5.9 km	MPC · JPL
46212	2001 FD_{162}	—	March 30, 2001	Haleakala	NEAT	·	4.4 km	MPC · JPL
46213	2001 FN_{162}	—	March 31, 2001	Socorro	LINEAR	PHO · fast	3.1 km	MPC · JPL
46214	2001 FX_{166}	—	March 19, 2001	Haleakala	NEAT	·	3.4 km	MPC · JPL
46215	2001 FX_{170}	—	March 24, 2001	Anderson Mesa	LONEOS	·	5.5 km	MPC · JPL
46216	2001 FK_{171}	—	March 24, 2001	Haleakala	NEAT	MAR	3.4 km	MPC · JPL
46217	2001 FK_{176}	—	March 16, 2001	Socorro	LINEAR	·	2.4 km	MPC · JPL
46218	2001 FV_{177}	—	March 18, 2001	Haleakala	NEAT	EOS	4.9 km	MPC · JPL
46219	2001 FB_{187}	—	March 19, 2001	Anderson Mesa	LONEOS	·	3.2 km	MPC · JPL
46220	2001 FW_{189}	—	March 18, 2001	Socorro	LINEAR	·	7.8 km	MPC · JPL
46221	2001 GP	—	April 1, 2001	Socorro	LINEAR	·	5.3 km	MPC · JPL
46222	2001 GJ_{5}	—	April 15, 2001	Socorro	LINEAR	THB	11 km	MPC · JPL
46223	2001 GV_{7}	—	April 15, 2001	Socorro	LINEAR	·	3.3 km	MPC · JPL
46224	2001 GN_{10}	—	April 15, 2001	Haleakala	NEAT	·	6.2 km	MPC · JPL
46225	2001 GV_{10}	—	April 15, 2001	Haleakala	NEAT	·	6.6 km	MPC · JPL
46226	2001 HP_{2}	—	April 17, 2001	Socorro	LINEAR	EOS	7.0 km	MPC · JPL
46227	2001 HQ_{2}	—	April 17, 2001	Socorro	LINEAR	·	11 km	MPC · JPL
46228	2001 HZ_{2}	—	April 17, 2001	Socorro	LINEAR	THM	5.8 km	MPC · JPL
46229	2001 HQ_{3}	—	April 17, 2001	Socorro	LINEAR	EUN	2.7 km	MPC · JPL
46230	2001 HZ_{4}	—	April 16, 2001	Socorro	LINEAR	EUN	3.3 km	MPC · JPL
46231	2001 HM_{5}	—	April 18, 2001	Socorro	LINEAR	·	16 km	MPC · JPL
46232	2001 HS_{7}	—	April 17, 2001	Desert Beaver	W. K. Y. Yeung	·	4.6 km	MPC · JPL
46233	2001 HF_{9}	—	April 16, 2001	Socorro	LINEAR	EUN	2.4 km	MPC · JPL
46234	2001 HK_{9}	—	April 16, 2001	Socorro	LINEAR	·	6.2 km	MPC · JPL
46235	2001 HX_{9}	—	April 16, 2001	Socorro	LINEAR	·	9.2 km	MPC · JPL
46236	2001 HA_{10}	—	April 16, 2001	Socorro	LINEAR	·	5.1 km	MPC · JPL
46237	2001 HB_{10}	—	April 16, 2001	Socorro	LINEAR	·	4.2 km	MPC · JPL
46238	2001 HE_{10}	—	April 16, 2001	Socorro	LINEAR	V	2.0 km	MPC · JPL
46239	2001 HX_{10}	—	April 17, 2001	Socorro	LINEAR	EUN	3.7 km	MPC · JPL
46240	2001 HT_{11}	—	April 18, 2001	Socorro	LINEAR	·	3.3 km	MPC · JPL
46241	2001 HG_{12}	—	April 18, 2001	Socorro	LINEAR	EOS	4.5 km	MPC · JPL
46242	2001 HQ_{12}	—	April 18, 2001	Socorro	LINEAR	EOS	4.9 km	MPC · JPL
46243	2001 HR_{12}	—	April 18, 2001	Socorro	LINEAR	·	4.6 km	MPC · JPL
46244	2001 HU_{15}	—	April 24, 2001	Desert Beaver	W. K. Y. Yeung	·	13 km	MPC · JPL
46245	2001 HU_{20}	—	April 21, 2001	Socorro	LINEAR	·	5.9 km	MPC · JPL
46246	2001 HX_{20}	—	April 23, 2001	Socorro	LINEAR	·	9.3 km	MPC · JPL
46247	2001 HG_{22}	—	April 23, 2001	Socorro	LINEAR	·	4.3 km	MPC · JPL
46248	2001 HM_{22}	—	April 25, 2001	Ametlla de Mar	Ametlla de Mar	·	13 km	MPC · JPL
46249	2001 HQ_{22}	—	April 25, 2001	Desert Beaver	W. K. Y. Yeung	THM	6.1 km	MPC · JPL
46250	2001 HP_{28}	—	April 27, 2001	Socorro	LINEAR	HYG	9.8 km	MPC · JPL
46251	2001 HO_{31}	—	April 26, 2001	Desert Beaver	W. K. Y. Yeung	EOS	6.9 km	MPC · JPL
46252 Emamajerová	2001 HH_{32}	Emamajerová	April 30, 2001	Kleť	Kleť	·	12 km	MPC · JPL
46253	2001 HW_{34}	—	April 27, 2001	Socorro	LINEAR	EOS	6.9 km	MPC · JPL
46254	2001 HB_{36}	—	April 29, 2001	Socorro	LINEAR	TIR	5.2 km	MPC · JPL
46255	2001 HZ_{36}	—	April 29, 2001	Socorro	LINEAR	·	13 km	MPC · JPL
46256	2001 HR_{40}	—	April 27, 2001	Socorro	LINEAR	·	3.1 km	MPC · JPL
46257	2001 HF_{44}	—	April 16, 2001	Anderson Mesa	LONEOS	·	11 km	MPC · JPL
46258	2001 HE_{45}	—	April 16, 2001	Anderson Mesa	LONEOS	·	3.1 km	MPC · JPL
46259	2001 HR_{45}	—	April 17, 2001	Anderson Mesa	LONEOS	GEF	3.4 km	MPC · JPL
46260	2001 HC_{46}	—	April 17, 2001	Anderson Mesa	LONEOS	·	8.1 km	MPC · JPL
46261	2001 HA_{47}	—	April 18, 2001	Haleakala	NEAT	·	4.9 km	MPC · JPL
46262	2001 HX_{47}	—	April 19, 2001	Haleakala	NEAT	EUN	4.2 km	MPC · JPL
46263	2001 HH_{48}	—	April 21, 2001	Socorro	LINEAR	·	16 km	MPC · JPL
46264	2001 HB_{50}	—	April 21, 2001	Socorro	LINEAR	·	3.8 km	MPC · JPL
46265	2001 HC_{51}	—	April 23, 2001	Socorro	LINEAR	EOS	4.5 km	MPC · JPL
46266	2001 HE_{52}	—	April 23, 2001	Socorro	LINEAR	EOS	4.7 km	MPC · JPL
46267	2001 HR_{55}	—	April 24, 2001	Socorro	LINEAR	·	3.1 km	MPC · JPL
46268	2001 HJ_{56}	—	April 24, 2001	Haleakala	NEAT	·	4.6 km	MPC · JPL
46269	2001 HA_{58}	—	April 25, 2001	Anderson Mesa	LONEOS	EOS · slow	4.9 km	MPC · JPL
46270 Margaretlandis	2001 HW_{62}	Margaretlandis	April 26, 2001	Anderson Mesa	LONEOS	·	7.3 km	MPC · JPL
46271	2001 HE_{63}	—	April 26, 2001	Anderson Mesa	LONEOS	EOS	5.0 km	MPC · JPL
46272	2001 HO_{64}	—	April 27, 2001	Haleakala	NEAT	·	3.9 km	MPC · JPL
46273	2001 HX_{64}	—	April 27, 2001	Haleakala	NEAT	·	3.0 km	MPC · JPL
46274	2001 JU_{3}	—	May 15, 2001	Haleakala	NEAT	·	6.8 km	MPC · JPL
46275	2001 JW_{3}	—	May 15, 2001	Haleakala	NEAT	·	9.1 km	MPC · JPL
46276	2001 JQ_{4}	—	May 15, 2001	Palomar	NEAT	·	5.9 km	MPC · JPL
46277 Jeffhall	2001 JH_{7}	Jeffhall	May 15, 2001	Anderson Mesa	LONEOS	·	8.4 km	MPC · JPL
46278	2001 KM	—	May 17, 2001	Socorro	LINEAR	·	9.3 km	MPC · JPL
46279	2001 KQ_{12}	—	May 18, 2001	Socorro	LINEAR	·	8.4 km	MPC · JPL
46280 Hollar	2001 KD_{18}	Hollar	May 21, 2001	Ondřejov	P. Pravec, P. Kušnirák	EUN	4.3 km	MPC · JPL
46281	2001 KR_{19}	—	May 22, 2001	Socorro	LINEAR	V	2.1 km	MPC · JPL
46282	2001 KU_{26}	—	May 17, 2001	Socorro	LINEAR	·	4.1 km	MPC · JPL
46283	2001 KE_{29}	—	May 21, 2001	Socorro	LINEAR	·	5.2 km	MPC · JPL
46284	2001 KU_{33}	—	May 18, 2001	Socorro	LINEAR	·	4.6 km	MPC · JPL
46285	2001 KD_{36}	—	May 18, 2001	Socorro	LINEAR	·	7.2 km	MPC · JPL
46286	2001 KR_{37}	—	May 22, 2001	Socorro	LINEAR	EOS	6.0 km	MPC · JPL
46287	2001 KJ_{41}	—	May 23, 2001	Socorro	LINEAR	·	9.5 km	MPC · JPL
46288	2001 KK_{43}	—	May 22, 2001	Socorro	LINEAR	EOS	7.0 km	MPC · JPL
46289	2001 KO_{49}	—	May 24, 2001	Socorro	LINEAR	·	5.5 km	MPC · JPL
46290	2001 KY_{51}	—	May 16, 2001	Haleakala	NEAT	·	2.8 km	MPC · JPL
46291	2001 KN_{54}	—	May 17, 2001	Haleakala	NEAT	EOS	4.1 km	MPC · JPL
46292	2001 KY_{56}	—	May 23, 2001	Socorro	LINEAR	EOS	6.5 km	MPC · JPL
46293	2001 KF_{58}	—	May 26, 2001	Socorro	LINEAR	EOS	5.7 km	MPC · JPL
46294	2001 KR_{65}	—	May 22, 2001	Anderson Mesa	LONEOS	EUN	4.0 km	MPC · JPL
46295	2001 KP_{70}	—	May 23, 2001	Haleakala	NEAT	·	7.6 km	MPC · JPL
46296	2001 KU_{71}	—	May 24, 2001	Anderson Mesa	LONEOS	·	8.0 km	MPC · JPL
46297	2001 MK_{13}	—	June 24, 2001	Palomar	NEAT	EUN	4.4 km	MPC · JPL
46298	2001 MU_{18}	—	June 29, 2001	Anderson Mesa	LONEOS	EOS	5.0 km	MPC · JPL
46299	2001 MR_{24}	—	June 16, 2001	Anderson Mesa	LONEOS	·	15 km	MPC · JPL
46300	2001 MW_{27}	—	June 22, 2001	Palomar	NEAT	·	7.2 km	MPC · JPL

== 46301–46400 ==
back to top

Designation			Discovery			Properties		Ref
Permanent	Provisional	Named after	Date	Site	Discoverer(s)	Category	Diam.	Ref
46301	2001 OY_{5}	—	July 17, 2001	Anderson Mesa	LONEOS	ADE	9.6 km	MPC · JPL
46302	2001 OG_{13}	—	July 20, 2001	Socorro	LINEAR	3:2	20 km	MPC · JPL
46303	2001 OZ_{44}	—	July 16, 2001	Anderson Mesa	LONEOS	·	11 km	MPC · JPL
46304	2001 OZ_{62}	—	July 20, 2001	Anderson Mesa	LONEOS	·	4.3 km	MPC · JPL
46305	2001 OW_{71}	—	July 21, 2001	Haleakala	NEAT	CYB	7.8 km	MPC · JPL
46306	2001 OW_{102}	—	July 29, 2001	Anderson Mesa	LONEOS	·	5.5 km	MPC · JPL
46307	2001 OX_{104}	—	July 28, 2001	Anderson Mesa	LONEOS	KOR	4.7 km	MPC · JPL
46308 Joelsercel	2001 OZ_{104}	Joelsercel	July 28, 2001	Anderson Mesa	LONEOS	KOR	5.1 km	MPC · JPL
46309	2001 QA_{2}	—	August 16, 2001	Socorro	LINEAR	·	9.0 km	MPC · JPL
46310	2001 QQ_{11}	—	August 16, 2001	Socorro	LINEAR	·	5.4 km	MPC · JPL
46311	2001 QF_{20}	—	August 16, 2001	Socorro	LINEAR	·	4.0 km	MPC · JPL
46312	2001 QJ_{25}	—	August 16, 2001	Socorro	LINEAR	·	3.1 km	MPC · JPL
46313	2001 QO_{25}	—	August 16, 2001	Socorro	LINEAR	EOS	6.7 km	MPC · JPL
46314	2001 QK_{29}	—	August 16, 2001	Socorro	LINEAR	·	2.7 km	MPC · JPL
46315	2001 QR_{30}	—	August 16, 2001	Socorro	LINEAR	·	4.6 km	MPC · JPL
46316	2001 QH_{31}	—	August 16, 2001	Socorro	LINEAR	·	3.3 km	MPC · JPL
46317	2001 QN_{53}	—	August 16, 2001	Socorro	LINEAR	·	5.5 km	MPC · JPL
46318	2001 QO_{74}	—	August 16, 2001	Socorro	LINEAR	·	4.6 km	MPC · JPL
46319	2001 QP_{74}	—	August 16, 2001	Socorro	LINEAR	·	5.3 km	MPC · JPL
46320	2001 QY_{74}	—	August 16, 2001	Socorro	LINEAR	·	2.3 km	MPC · JPL
46321	2001 QO_{84}	—	August 18, 2001	Socorro	LINEAR	KOR	4.4 km	MPC · JPL
46322	2001 QD_{99}	—	August 22, 2001	Socorro	LINEAR	·	6.2 km	MPC · JPL
46323	2001 QH_{115}	—	August 17, 2001	Socorro	LINEAR	EOS	7.5 km	MPC · JPL
46324	2001 QW_{119}	—	August 18, 2001	Socorro	LINEAR	·	4.5 km	MPC · JPL
46325	2001 QZ_{130}	—	August 20, 2001	Socorro	LINEAR	(31811) ·	13 km	MPC · JPL
46326	2001 QU_{148}	—	August 20, 2001	Haleakala	NEAT	(2076)	3.0 km	MPC · JPL
46327	2001 QU_{161}	—	August 23, 2001	Anderson Mesa	LONEOS	·	3.8 km	MPC · JPL
46328	2001 QD_{216}	—	August 23, 2001	Anderson Mesa	LONEOS	(12739)	3.6 km	MPC · JPL
46329	2001 QW_{232}	—	August 24, 2001	Socorro	LINEAR	·	5.6 km	MPC · JPL
46330	2001 QQ_{234}	—	August 24, 2001	Socorro	LINEAR	·	5.6 km	MPC · JPL
46331	2001 QB_{264}	—	August 25, 2001	Anderson Mesa	LONEOS	·	3.8 km	MPC · JPL
46332	2001 QD_{276}	—	August 19, 2001	Socorro	LINEAR	EOS · slow	8.5 km	MPC · JPL
46333	2001 QS_{276}	—	August 19, 2001	Socorro	LINEAR	EOS	7.1 km	MPC · JPL
46334	2001 QA_{296}	—	August 24, 2001	Anderson Mesa	LONEOS	EUN	3.7 km	MPC · JPL
46335	2001 RF_{57}	—	September 12, 2001	Socorro	LINEAR	·	2.8 km	MPC · JPL
46336	2001 RG_{67}	—	September 10, 2001	Socorro	LINEAR	PAD	7.1 km	MPC · JPL
46337	2001 RE_{76}	—	September 10, 2001	Socorro	LINEAR	·	3.2 km	MPC · JPL
46338	2001 RF_{80}	—	September 12, 2001	Palomar	NEAT	·	7.4 km	MPC · JPL
46339	2001 RU_{81}	—	September 14, 2001	Palomar	NEAT	·	4.0 km	MPC · JPL
46340	2001 RG_{86}	—	September 11, 2001	Anderson Mesa	LONEOS	·	3.2 km	MPC · JPL
46341	2001 RE_{89}	—	September 11, 2001	Anderson Mesa	LONEOS	·	5.7 km	MPC · JPL
46342	2001 SC_{53}	—	September 16, 2001	Socorro	LINEAR	THM	9.6 km	MPC · JPL
46343	2001 SY_{56}	—	September 16, 2001	Socorro	LINEAR	·	4.4 km	MPC · JPL
46344	2001 SR_{58}	—	September 17, 2001	Socorro	LINEAR	·	2.7 km	MPC · JPL
46345	2001 SP_{110}	—	September 20, 2001	Socorro	LINEAR	·	4.1 km	MPC · JPL
46346	2001 SX_{112}	—	September 18, 2001	Desert Eagle	W. K. Y. Yeung	ADE	6.4 km	MPC · JPL
46347	2001 SV_{123}	—	September 16, 2001	Socorro	LINEAR	EOS	5.9 km	MPC · JPL
46348	2001 SC_{136}	—	September 16, 2001	Socorro	LINEAR	·	5.2 km	MPC · JPL
46349	2001 SM_{140}	—	September 16, 2001	Socorro	LINEAR	·	3.6 km	MPC · JPL
46350	2001 SH_{180}	—	September 19, 2001	Socorro	LINEAR	VER	8.7 km	MPC · JPL
46351	2001 SD_{226}	—	September 19, 2001	Socorro	LINEAR	THM	6.6 km	MPC · JPL
46352	2001 SZ_{266}	—	September 25, 2001	Desert Eagle	W. K. Y. Yeung	·	3.2 km	MPC · JPL
46353	2001 TY_{7}	—	October 11, 2001	Desert Eagle	W. K. Y. Yeung	·	5.8 km	MPC · JPL
46354	2001 TY_{8}	—	October 9, 2001	Socorro	LINEAR	EUN	6.9 km	MPC · JPL
46355	2001 TQ_{65}	—	October 13, 2001	Socorro	LINEAR	·	9.7 km	MPC · JPL
46356	2001 TQ_{75}	—	October 13, 2001	Socorro	LINEAR	·	2.1 km	MPC · JPL
46357	2001 TG_{77}	—	October 13, 2001	Socorro	LINEAR	MAR	3.0 km	MPC · JPL
46358	2001 TO_{79}	—	October 13, 2001	Socorro	LINEAR	·	2.1 km	MPC · JPL
46359	2001 TQ_{104}	—	October 13, 2001	Socorro	LINEAR	AGN	7.1 km	MPC · JPL
46360	2001 TA_{105}	—	October 13, 2001	Socorro	LINEAR	NYS	3.2 km	MPC · JPL
46361	2001 TR_{105}	—	October 13, 2001	Socorro	LINEAR	·	9.2 km	MPC · JPL
46362	2001 TO_{118}	—	October 15, 2001	Socorro	LINEAR	·	10 km	MPC · JPL
46363	2001 UX_{34}	—	October 16, 2001	Socorro	LINEAR	·	6.4 km	MPC · JPL
46364	2001 UM_{35}	—	October 16, 2001	Socorro	LINEAR	·	7.7 km	MPC · JPL
46365	2001 UJ_{47}	—	October 17, 2001	Socorro	LINEAR	·	2.9 km	MPC · JPL
46366	2001 UA_{66}	—	October 18, 2001	Socorro	LINEAR	KON	7.7 km	MPC · JPL
46367	2001 UP_{125}	—	October 22, 2001	Palomar	NEAT	EUN	4.2 km	MPC · JPL
46368	2001 VR_{36}	—	November 9, 2001	Socorro	LINEAR	slow	4.2 km	MPC · JPL
46369	2001 VX_{42}	—	November 9, 2001	Socorro	LINEAR	·	1.8 km	MPC · JPL
46370	2001 VY_{43}	—	November 9, 2001	Socorro	LINEAR	·	2.3 km	MPC · JPL
46371	2001 VZ_{45}	—	November 9, 2001	Socorro	LINEAR	V	2.4 km	MPC · JPL
46372	2001 VG_{67}	—	November 10, 2001	Socorro	LINEAR	·	3.8 km	MPC · JPL
46373	2001 VA_{123}	—	November 11, 2001	Anderson Mesa	LONEOS	·	3.0 km	MPC · JPL
46374	2001 WZ_{13}	—	November 17, 2001	Socorro	LINEAR	·	6.7 km	MPC · JPL
46375	2001 WD_{29}	—	November 17, 2001	Socorro	LINEAR	·	5.0 km	MPC · JPL
46376	2001 XD_{3}	—	December 9, 2001	Socorro	LINEAR	H	1.8 km	MPC · JPL
46377	2001 XX_{7}	—	December 8, 2001	Socorro	LINEAR	·	9.5 km	MPC · JPL
46378	2001 XD_{17}	—	December 9, 2001	Socorro	LINEAR	·	3.3 km	MPC · JPL
46379	2001 XD_{22}	—	December 9, 2001	Socorro	LINEAR	V	1.4 km	MPC · JPL
46380	2001 XF_{54}	—	December 10, 2001	Socorro	LINEAR	EUN	3.4 km	MPC · JPL
46381	2001 XQ_{59}	—	December 10, 2001	Socorro	LINEAR	NYS	3.3 km	MPC · JPL
46382	2001 XP_{85}	—	December 11, 2001	Socorro	LINEAR	PHO	5.6 km	MPC · JPL
46383	2001 XC_{114}	—	December 13, 2001	Socorro	LINEAR	V	2.3 km	MPC · JPL
46384	2001 XM_{115}	—	December 13, 2001	Socorro	LINEAR	V	1.4 km	MPC · JPL
46385	2001 XA_{152}	—	December 14, 2001	Socorro	LINEAR	PHO	2.9 km	MPC · JPL
46386	2001 XP_{195}	—	December 14, 2001	Socorro	LINEAR	·	2.0 km	MPC · JPL
46387	2001 XE_{215}	—	December 13, 2001	Socorro	LINEAR	·	3.0 km	MPC · JPL
46388	2001 XH_{246}	—	December 15, 2001	Socorro	LINEAR	·	1.8 km	MPC · JPL
46389	2001 YJ_{45}	—	December 18, 2001	Socorro	LINEAR	·	2.9 km	MPC · JPL
46390	2001 YT_{96}	—	December 18, 2001	Palomar	NEAT	·	2.2 km	MPC · JPL
46391	2001 YJ_{97}	—	December 17, 2001	Socorro	LINEAR	·	1.9 km	MPC · JPL
46392 Bertola	2002 AO_{6}	Bertola	January 5, 2002	Asiago	ADAS	·	2.7 km	MPC · JPL
46393	2002 AS_{10}	—	January 6, 2002	Haleakala	NEAT	·	2.1 km	MPC · JPL
46394	2002 AZ_{10}	—	January 11, 2002	Oizumi	T. Kobayashi	·	2.6 km	MPC · JPL
46395	2002 CT_{4}	—	February 4, 2002	Palomar	NEAT	·	2.1 km	MPC · JPL
46396	2002 CD_{39}	—	February 9, 2002	Desert Eagle	W. K. Y. Yeung	·	5.2 km	MPC · JPL
46397	2002 CE_{102}	—	February 7, 2002	Socorro	LINEAR	·	1.8 km	MPC · JPL
46398	2002 CQ_{146}	—	February 9, 2002	Socorro	LINEAR	·	3.5 km	MPC · JPL
46399	2002 CD_{169}	—	February 8, 2002	Socorro	LINEAR	·	4.3 km	MPC · JPL
46400	2002 CG_{220}	—	February 10, 2002	Socorro	LINEAR	·	2.5 km	MPC · JPL

== 46401–46500 ==
back to top

Designation			Discovery			Properties		Ref
Permanent	Provisional	Named after	Date	Site	Discoverer(s)	Category	Diam.	Ref
46401	2002 CY_{240}	—	February 11, 2002	Socorro	LINEAR	KOR	2.9 km	MPC · JPL
46402	2002 DB_{16}	—	February 16, 2002	Haleakala	NEAT	·	5.0 km	MPC · JPL
46403	2002 EQ_{20}	—	March 9, 2002	Socorro	LINEAR	V	1.5 km	MPC · JPL
46404	2002 EV_{20}	—	March 9, 2002	Socorro	LINEAR	HNS	4.2 km	MPC · JPL
46405	2002 EJ_{28}	—	March 9, 2002	Socorro	LINEAR	·	3.5 km	MPC · JPL
46406	2002 EQ_{67}	—	March 13, 2002	Socorro	LINEAR	·	2.3 km	MPC · JPL
46407	2002 EC_{74}	—	March 13, 2002	Socorro	LINEAR	·	4.7 km	MPC · JPL
46408	2002 FO_{3}	—	March 19, 2002	Fountain Hills	Hills, Fountain	·	4.7 km	MPC · JPL
46409	2002 FT_{35}	—	March 21, 2002	Socorro	LINEAR	·	8.3 km	MPC · JPL
46410	2002 GF_{46}	—	April 2, 2002	Palomar	NEAT	·	3.4 km	MPC · JPL
46411	2002 GS_{68}	—	April 8, 2002	Socorro	LINEAR	EUN	3.4 km	MPC · JPL
46412	2002 GL_{76}	—	April 9, 2002	Socorro	LINEAR	VER	6.5 km	MPC · JPL
46413	2002 GS_{87}	—	April 10, 2002	Socorro	LINEAR	·	3.3 km	MPC · JPL
46414	2002 GD_{113}	—	April 11, 2002	Anderson Mesa	LONEOS	EOS	4.8 km	MPC · JPL
46415	2002 GV_{125}	—	April 12, 2002	Socorro	LINEAR	·	3.0 km	MPC · JPL
46416	2002 HK	—	April 16, 2002	Desert Eagle	W. K. Y. Yeung	(5)	2.9 km	MPC · JPL
46417	2002 JV_{4}	—	May 4, 2002	Desert Eagle	W. K. Y. Yeung	·	5.0 km	MPC · JPL
46418	2002 JS_{12}	—	May 6, 2002	Desert Eagle	W. K. Y. Yeung	·	3.1 km	MPC · JPL
46419	2002 JO_{21}	—	May 9, 2002	Desert Eagle	W. K. Y. Yeung	·	1.7 km	MPC · JPL
46420	2002 JH_{23}	—	May 8, 2002	Socorro	LINEAR	(194)	2.9 km	MPC · JPL
46421	2002 JC_{33}	—	May 9, 2002	Socorro	LINEAR	V	1.8 km	MPC · JPL
46422	2002 JO_{33}	—	May 9, 2002	Socorro	LINEAR	·	4.3 km	MPC · JPL
46423	2002 JR_{34}	—	May 9, 2002	Socorro	LINEAR	·	3.7 km	MPC · JPL
46424	2002 JZ_{35}	—	May 9, 2002	Socorro	LINEAR	·	2.7 km	MPC · JPL
46425	2002 JP_{44}	—	May 9, 2002	Socorro	LINEAR	·	3.1 km	MPC · JPL
46426	2002 JG_{58}	—	May 9, 2002	Socorro	LINEAR	·	4.0 km	MPC · JPL
46427	2002 JS_{59}	—	May 9, 2002	Socorro	LINEAR	HYG	8.1 km	MPC · JPL
46428	2002 JO_{63}	—	May 9, 2002	Socorro	LINEAR	·	1.9 km	MPC · JPL
46429	2002 JP_{63}	—	May 9, 2002	Socorro	LINEAR	·	1.6 km	MPC · JPL
46430	2002 JV_{63}	—	May 9, 2002	Socorro	LINEAR	·	1.5 km	MPC · JPL
46431	2002 JL_{65}	—	May 9, 2002	Socorro	LINEAR	HYG	8.0 km	MPC · JPL
46432	2002 JR_{65}	—	May 9, 2002	Socorro	LINEAR	·	4.6 km	MPC · JPL
46433	2002 JQ_{67}	—	May 9, 2002	Socorro	LINEAR	·	2.3 km	MPC · JPL
46434	2002 JK_{143}	—	May 12, 2002	Socorro	LINEAR	EUN	3.3 km	MPC · JPL
46435	2002 KY_{4}	—	May 16, 2002	Socorro	LINEAR	·	2.3 km	MPC · JPL
46436	2002 LH_{5}	—	June 6, 2002	Fountain Hills	C. W. Juels, P. R. Holvorcem	·	15 km	MPC · JPL
46437	2002 LL_{5}	—	June 6, 2002	Fountain Hills	C. W. Juels, P. R. Holvorcem	·	2.6 km	MPC · JPL
46438	2002 LZ_{7}	—	June 4, 2002	Socorro	LINEAR	·	1.8 km	MPC · JPL
46439	2002 LX_{12}	—	June 5, 2002	Socorro	LINEAR	·	3.4 km	MPC · JPL
46440	2002 LS_{27}	—	June 9, 2002	Socorro	LINEAR	·	2.4 km	MPC · JPL
46441 Mikepenston	2002 LE_{30}	Mikepenston	June 10, 2002	Fountain Hills	C. W. Juels, P. R. Holvorcem	EUN	4.3 km	MPC · JPL
46442 Keithtritton	2002 LK_{35}	Keithtritton	June 12, 2002	Fountain Hills	C. W. Juels, P. R. Holvorcem	·	14 km	MPC · JPL
46443	2002 LW_{43}	—	June 10, 2002	Socorro	LINEAR	·	4.5 km	MPC · JPL
46444	2089 P-L	—	September 24, 1960	Palomar	C. J. van Houten, I. van Houten-Groeneveld, T. Gehrels	·	3.2 km	MPC · JPL
46445	2102 P-L	—	September 24, 1960	Palomar	C. J. van Houten, I. van Houten-Groeneveld, T. Gehrels	·	2.1 km	MPC · JPL
46446	2110 P-L	—	September 24, 1960	Palomar	C. J. van Houten, I. van Houten-Groeneveld, T. Gehrels	·	2.5 km	MPC · JPL
46447	2208 P-L	—	September 24, 1960	Palomar	C. J. van Houten, I. van Houten-Groeneveld, T. Gehrels	·	2.8 km	MPC · JPL
46448	2829 P-L	—	September 24, 1960	Palomar	C. J. van Houten, I. van Houten-Groeneveld, T. Gehrels	·	3.1 km	MPC · JPL
46449	3036 P-L	—	September 24, 1960	Palomar	C. J. van Houten, I. van Houten-Groeneveld, T. Gehrels	slow	2.1 km	MPC · JPL
46450	3039 P-L	—	September 24, 1960	Palomar	C. J. van Houten, I. van Houten-Groeneveld, T. Gehrels	DOR	6.2 km	MPC · JPL
46451	3050 P-L	—	September 24, 1960	Palomar	C. J. van Houten, I. van Houten-Groeneveld, T. Gehrels	EOS	11 km	MPC · JPL
46452	3097 P-L	—	September 24, 1960	Palomar	C. J. van Houten, I. van Houten-Groeneveld, T. Gehrels	DOR	8.6 km	MPC · JPL
46453	4013 P-L	—	September 24, 1960	Palomar	C. J. van Houten, I. van Houten-Groeneveld, T. Gehrels	DOR	6.6 km	MPC · JPL
46454	4029 P-L	—	September 24, 1960	Palomar	C. J. van Houten, I. van Houten-Groeneveld, T. Gehrels	·	2.0 km	MPC · JPL
46455	4054 P-L	—	September 24, 1960	Palomar	C. J. van Houten, I. van Houten-Groeneveld, T. Gehrels	MRX	3.3 km	MPC · JPL
46456	4140 P-L	—	September 24, 1960	Palomar	C. J. van Houten, I. van Houten-Groeneveld, T. Gehrels	EUN	4.2 km	MPC · JPL
46457	4166 P-L	—	September 24, 1960	Palomar	C. J. van Houten, I. van Houten-Groeneveld, T. Gehrels	·	5.6 km	MPC · JPL
46458	4244 P-L	—	September 24, 1960	Palomar	C. J. van Houten, I. van Houten-Groeneveld, T. Gehrels	·	2.7 km	MPC · JPL
46459	4540 P-L	—	September 24, 1960	Palomar	C. J. van Houten, I. van Houten-Groeneveld, T. Gehrels	·	9.9 km	MPC · JPL
46460	4798 P-L	—	September 24, 1960	Palomar	C. J. van Houten, I. van Houten-Groeneveld, T. Gehrels	NYS	1.8 km	MPC · JPL
46461	6105 P-L	—	September 24, 1960	Palomar	C. J. van Houten, I. van Houten-Groeneveld, T. Gehrels	·	4.0 km	MPC · JPL
46462	6179 P-L	—	September 24, 1960	Palomar	C. J. van Houten, I. van Houten-Groeneveld, T. Gehrels	·	2.2 km	MPC · JPL
46463	6290 P-L	—	September 24, 1960	Palomar	C. J. van Houten, I. van Houten-Groeneveld, T. Gehrels	·	1.4 km	MPC · JPL
46464	6602 P-L	—	September 24, 1960	Palomar	C. J. van Houten, I. van Houten-Groeneveld, T. Gehrels	·	1.5 km	MPC · JPL
46465	6617 P-L	—	September 24, 1960	Palomar	C. J. van Houten, I. van Houten-Groeneveld, T. Gehrels	V	2.2 km	MPC · JPL
46466	6622 P-L	—	September 24, 1960	Palomar	C. J. van Houten, I. van Houten-Groeneveld, T. Gehrels	·	6.4 km	MPC · JPL
46467	6730 P-L	—	September 24, 1960	Palomar	C. J. van Houten, I. van Houten-Groeneveld, T. Gehrels	·	4.8 km	MPC · JPL
46468	6887 P-L	—	September 24, 1960	Palomar	C. J. van Houten, I. van Houten-Groeneveld, T. Gehrels	·	3.8 km	MPC · JPL
46469	9572 P-L	—	October 17, 1960	Palomar	C. J. van Houten, I. van Houten-Groeneveld, T. Gehrels	·	4.9 km	MPC · JPL
46470	9607 P-L	—	October 17, 1960	Palomar	C. J. van Houten, I. van Houten-Groeneveld, T. Gehrels	·	5.2 km	MPC · JPL
46471	1160 T-1	—	March 25, 1971	Palomar	C. J. van Houten, I. van Houten-Groeneveld, T. Gehrels	EUP	12 km	MPC · JPL
46472	2155 T-1	—	March 25, 1971	Palomar	C. J. van Houten, I. van Houten-Groeneveld, T. Gehrels	·	7.5 km	MPC · JPL
46473	3066 T-1	—	March 26, 1971	Palomar	C. J. van Houten, I. van Houten-Groeneveld, T. Gehrels	·	3.0 km	MPC · JPL
46474	3109 T-1	—	March 26, 1971	Palomar	C. J. van Houten, I. van Houten-Groeneveld, T. Gehrels	·	2.3 km	MPC · JPL
46475	3204 T-1	—	March 26, 1971	Palomar	C. J. van Houten, I. van Houten-Groeneveld, T. Gehrels	·	3.3 km	MPC · JPL
46476	4208 T-1	—	March 26, 1971	Palomar	C. J. van Houten, I. van Houten-Groeneveld, T. Gehrels	·	1.6 km	MPC · JPL
46477	4266 T-1	—	March 26, 1971	Palomar	C. J. van Houten, I. van Houten-Groeneveld, T. Gehrels	·	2.4 km	MPC · JPL
46478	1097 T-2	—	September 29, 1973	Palomar	C. J. van Houten, I. van Houten-Groeneveld, T. Gehrels	·	4.5 km	MPC · JPL
46479	1150 T-2	—	September 29, 1973	Palomar	C. J. van Houten, I. van Houten-Groeneveld, T. Gehrels	·	2.7 km	MPC · JPL
46480	1170 T-2	—	September 29, 1973	Palomar	C. J. van Houten, I. van Houten-Groeneveld, T. Gehrels	·	3.9 km	MPC · JPL
46481	1198 T-2	—	September 29, 1973	Palomar	C. J. van Houten, I. van Houten-Groeneveld, T. Gehrels	·	3.3 km	MPC · JPL
46482	1460 T-2	—	September 30, 1973	Palomar	C. J. van Houten, I. van Houten-Groeneveld, T. Gehrels	·	6.0 km	MPC · JPL
46483	1549 T-2	—	September 24, 1973	Palomar	C. J. van Houten, I. van Houten-Groeneveld, T. Gehrels	·	5.8 km	MPC · JPL
46484	2245 T-2	—	September 29, 1973	Palomar	C. J. van Houten, I. van Houten-Groeneveld, T. Gehrels	NYS	2.8 km	MPC · JPL
46485	2279 T-2	—	September 29, 1973	Palomar	C. J. van Houten, I. van Houten-Groeneveld, T. Gehrels	·	5.3 km	MPC · JPL
46486	3113 T-2	—	September 30, 1973	Palomar	C. J. van Houten, I. van Houten-Groeneveld, T. Gehrels	·	3.8 km	MPC · JPL
46487	3322 T-2	—	September 25, 1973	Palomar	C. J. van Houten, I. van Houten-Groeneveld, T. Gehrels	·	2.5 km	MPC · JPL
46488	3335 T-2	—	September 24, 1973	Palomar	C. J. van Houten, I. van Houten-Groeneveld, T. Gehrels	·	3.5 km	MPC · JPL
46489	4156 T-2	—	September 29, 1973	Palomar	C. J. van Houten, I. van Houten-Groeneveld, T. Gehrels	·	2.2 km	MPC · JPL
46490	4164 T-2	—	September 29, 1973	Palomar	C. J. van Houten, I. van Houten-Groeneveld, T. Gehrels	NYS	3.3 km	MPC · JPL
46491	5070 T-2	—	September 25, 1973	Palomar	C. J. van Houten, I. van Houten-Groeneveld, T. Gehrels	·	8.5 km	MPC · JPL
46492	1023 T-3	—	October 17, 1977	Palomar	C. J. van Houten, I. van Houten-Groeneveld, T. Gehrels	·	2.2 km	MPC · JPL
46493	1032 T-3	—	October 17, 1977	Palomar	C. J. van Houten, I. van Houten-Groeneveld, T. Gehrels	EOS	6.4 km	MPC · JPL
46494	1088 T-3	—	October 17, 1977	Palomar	C. J. van Houten, I. van Houten-Groeneveld, T. Gehrels	·	3.1 km	MPC · JPL
46495	1123 T-3	—	October 17, 1977	Palomar	C. J. van Houten, I. van Houten-Groeneveld, T. Gehrels	TEL	4.0 km	MPC · JPL
46496	1157 T-3	—	October 17, 1977	Palomar	C. J. van Houten, I. van Houten-Groeneveld, T. Gehrels	EOS	5.9 km	MPC · JPL
46497	2214 T-3	—	October 17, 1977	Palomar	C. J. van Houten, I. van Houten-Groeneveld, T. Gehrels	·	2.9 km	MPC · JPL
46498	2240 T-3	—	October 16, 1977	Palomar	C. J. van Houten, I. van Houten-Groeneveld, T. Gehrels	·	2.2 km	MPC · JPL
46499	2409 T-3	—	October 16, 1977	Palomar	C. J. van Houten, I. van Houten-Groeneveld, T. Gehrels	NYS ·	3.3 km	MPC · JPL
46500	2610 T-3	—	October 16, 1977	Palomar	C. J. van Houten, I. van Houten-Groeneveld, T. Gehrels	NYS	3.2 km	MPC · JPL

== 46501–46600 ==
back to top

Designation			Discovery			Properties		Ref
Permanent	Provisional	Named after	Date	Site	Discoverer(s)	Category	Diam.	Ref
46501	2616 T-3	—	October 16, 1977	Palomar	C. J. van Houten, I. van Houten-Groeneveld, T. Gehrels	·	3.5 km	MPC · JPL
46502	3084 T-3	—	October 16, 1977	Palomar	C. J. van Houten, I. van Houten-Groeneveld, T. Gehrels	·	1.5 km	MPC · JPL
46503	3191 T-3	—	October 16, 1977	Palomar	C. J. van Houten, I. van Houten-Groeneveld, T. Gehrels	V	1.3 km	MPC · JPL
46504	3194 T-3	—	October 16, 1977	Palomar	C. J. van Houten, I. van Houten-Groeneveld, T. Gehrels	V	2.0 km	MPC · JPL
46505	3195 T-3	—	October 16, 1977	Palomar	C. J. van Houten, I. van Houten-Groeneveld, T. Gehrels	ADE	4.5 km	MPC · JPL
46506	3387 T-3	—	October 16, 1977	Palomar	C. J. van Houten, I. van Houten-Groeneveld, T. Gehrels	·	1.8 km	MPC · JPL
46507	3479 T-3	—	October 16, 1977	Palomar	C. J. van Houten, I. van Houten-Groeneveld, T. Gehrels	·	2.5 km	MPC · JPL
46508	3554 T-3	—	October 16, 1977	Palomar	C. J. van Houten, I. van Houten-Groeneveld, T. Gehrels	·	3.9 km	MPC · JPL
46509	4149 T-3	—	October 16, 1977	Palomar	C. J. van Houten, I. van Houten-Groeneveld, T. Gehrels	NYS	2.6 km	MPC · JPL
46510	4323 T-3	—	October 16, 1977	Palomar	C. J. van Houten, I. van Houten-Groeneveld, T. Gehrels	·	2.5 km	MPC · JPL
46511	4356 T-3	—	October 16, 1977	Palomar	C. J. van Houten, I. van Houten-Groeneveld, T. Gehrels	EOS	5.4 km	MPC · JPL
46512	1951 QD	—	August 31, 1951	Mount Wilson	L. E. Cunningham	DOR	8.2 km	MPC · JPL
46513 Ampzing	1972 FC	Ampzing	March 16, 1972	Palomar	T. Gehrels	H	1.4 km	MPC · JPL
46514 Lasswitz	1977 JA	Lasswitz	May 15, 1977	La Silla	H.-E. Schuster	PHO	2.2 km	MPC · JPL
46515	1978 VW_{5}	—	November 7, 1978	Palomar	E. F. Helin, S. J. Bus	·	2.8 km	MPC · JPL
46516	1978 VQ_{6}	—	November 6, 1978	Palomar	E. F. Helin, S. J. Bus	KOR	3.4 km	MPC · JPL
46517	1978 VM_{7}	—	November 7, 1978	Palomar	E. F. Helin, S. J. Bus	·	2.4 km	MPC · JPL
46518	1978 VH_{10}	—	November 6, 1978	Palomar	E. F. Helin, S. J. Bus	KOR	4.1 km	MPC · JPL
46519	1979 ME_{3}	—	June 25, 1979	Siding Spring	E. F. Helin, S. J. Bus	HYG	5.7 km	MPC · JPL
46520	1979 MJ_{3}	—	June 25, 1979	Siding Spring	E. F. Helin, S. J. Bus	PAD	6.2 km	MPC · JPL
46521	1979 MM_{7}	—	June 25, 1979	Siding Spring	E. F. Helin, S. J. Bus	·	1.2 km	MPC · JPL
46522	1979 MS_{7}	—	June 25, 1979	Siding Spring	E. F. Helin, S. J. Bus	·	3.0 km	MPC · JPL
46523	1979 OH_{10}	—	July 24, 1979	Siding Spring	S. J. Bus	·	7.8 km	MPC · JPL
46524	1979 QH_{2}	—	August 22, 1979	La Silla	C.-I. Lagerkvist	·	3.9 km	MPC · JPL
46525	1980 UG_{1}	—	October 31, 1980	Palomar	S. J. Bus	·	6.6 km	MPC · JPL
46526	1981 EN_{5}	—	March 2, 1981	Siding Spring	S. J. Bus	·	3.1 km	MPC · JPL
46527	1981 EE_{7}	—	March 6, 1981	Siding Spring	S. J. Bus	·	1.7 km	MPC · JPL
46528	1981 EB_{8}	—	March 1, 1981	Siding Spring	S. J. Bus	·	2.9 km	MPC · JPL
46529	1981 ED_{9}	—	March 1, 1981	Siding Spring	S. J. Bus	·	1.9 km	MPC · JPL
46530	1981 EE_{10}	—	March 1, 1981	Siding Spring	S. J. Bus	·	1.9 km	MPC · JPL
46531	1981 EV_{11}	—	March 7, 1981	Siding Spring	S. J. Bus	·	1.6 km	MPC · JPL
46532	1981 EN_{13}	—	March 1, 1981	Siding Spring	S. J. Bus	·	2.4 km	MPC · JPL
46533	1981 EO_{23}	—	March 3, 1981	Siding Spring	S. J. Bus	·	4.3 km	MPC · JPL
46534	1981 EU_{27}	—	March 2, 1981	Siding Spring	S. J. Bus	·	1.7 km	MPC · JPL
46535	1981 EB_{36}	—	March 3, 1981	Siding Spring	S. J. Bus	NYS	3.2 km	MPC · JPL
46536	1981 EJ_{40}	—	March 2, 1981	Siding Spring	S. J. Bus	PAL	4.8 km	MPC · JPL
46537	1981 EV_{45}	—	March 1, 1981	Siding Spring	S. J. Bus	·	5.9 km	MPC · JPL
46538	1981 UC_{26}	—	October 25, 1981	Palomar	S. J. Bus	·	9.3 km	MPC · JPL
46539 Viktortikhonov	1982 UE_{12}	Viktortikhonov	October 24, 1982	Nauchnij	L. V. Zhuravleva	·	5.7 km	MPC · JPL
46540	1983 LD	—	June 13, 1983	Palomar	E. F. Helin, R. S. Dunbar	H	1.7 km	MPC · JPL
46541	1984 SM_{6}	—	September 23, 1984	La Silla	H. Debehogne	·	4.9 km	MPC · JPL
46542	1987 AD	—	January 4, 1987	Palomar	Palomar	·	6.4 km	MPC · JPL
46543	1987 DL_{6}	—	February 23, 1987	La Silla	H. Debehogne	·	3.1 km	MPC · JPL
46544	1988 QO	—	August 19, 1988	Siding Spring	R. H. McNaught	·	1.8 km	MPC · JPL
46545	1988 RY_{12}	—	September 14, 1988	Cerro Tololo	S. J. Bus	·	5.0 km	MPC · JPL
46546	1988 VM_{5}	—	November 4, 1988	Kleť	A. Mrkos	·	5.1 km	MPC · JPL
46547	1989 GE_{3}	—	April 3, 1989	La Silla	E. W. Elst	·	9.2 km	MPC · JPL
46548	1989 SK_{1}	—	September 26, 1989	La Silla	E. W. Elst	LEO	5.9 km	MPC · JPL
46549	1989 SA_{2}	—	September 26, 1989	La Silla	E. W. Elst	·	4.2 km	MPC · JPL
46550	1989 SZ_{13}	—	September 26, 1989	Calar Alto	J. M. Baur, K. Birkle	·	3.6 km	MPC · JPL
46551	1989 TC_{4}	—	October 7, 1989	La Silla	E. W. Elst	·	4.4 km	MPC · JPL
46552	1990 RM_{1}	—	September 14, 1990	Palomar	H. E. Holt	EUN	3.6 km	MPC · JPL
46553	1990 RW_{14}	—	September 14, 1990	La Silla	E. W. Elst	·	2.0 km	MPC · JPL
46554	1990 SZ_{8}	—	September 22, 1990	La Silla	E. W. Elst	·	3.8 km	MPC · JPL
46555	1990 VH_{3}	—	November 11, 1990	Oohira	T. Urata	·	4.1 km	MPC · JPL
46556	1991 FU_{3}	—	March 22, 1991	La Silla	H. Debehogne	·	3.1 km	MPC · JPL
46557	1991 FW_{3}	—	March 22, 1991	La Silla	H. Debehogne	PAD	8.3 km	MPC · JPL
46558	1991 GY_{5}	—	April 8, 1991	La Silla	E. W. Elst	·	1.6 km	MPC · JPL
46559	1991 PC_{1}	—	August 15, 1991	Palomar	E. F. Helin	H	1.4 km	MPC · JPL
46560	1991 PZ_{1}	—	August 2, 1991	La Silla	E. W. Elst	·	2.8 km	MPC · JPL
46561	1991 RQ	—	September 7, 1991	Palomar	E. F. Helin	·	4.7 km	MPC · JPL
46562	1991 RV	—	September 7, 1991	Palomar	E. F. Helin	NYS	3.2 km	MPC · JPL
46563 Oken	1991 RY_{3}	Oken	September 12, 1991	Tautenburg Observatory	F. Börngen, L. D. Schmadel	slow	9.0 km	MPC · JPL
46564	1991 RA_{11}	—	September 10, 1991	Palomar	H. E. Holt	URS	22 km	MPC · JPL
46565	1991 RF_{17}	—	September 15, 1991	Palomar	H. E. Holt	V	2.0 km	MPC · JPL
46566	1991 RW_{21}	—	September 11, 1991	Palomar	H. E. Holt	fast?	6.5 km	MPC · JPL
46567	1991 RV_{23}	—	September 11, 1991	Palomar	H. E. Holt	·	3.2 km	MPC · JPL
46568 Stevenlee	1991 SL	Stevenlee	September 30, 1991	Siding Spring	R. H. McNaught	H	2.1 km	MPC · JPL
46569	1991 SY_{1}	—	September 16, 1991	Palomar	H. E. Holt	·	3.9 km	MPC · JPL
46570	1991 TK_{8}	—	October 1, 1991	Kitt Peak	Spacewatch	·	2.8 km	MPC · JPL
46571	1991 VG_{1}	—	November 4, 1991	Kushiro	S. Ueda, H. Kaneda	·	4.2 km	MPC · JPL
46572	1991 VA_{5}	—	November 4, 1991	Dynic	A. Sugie	PHO	4.5 km	MPC · JPL
46573	1992 AJ_{1}	—	January 10, 1992	Dynic	A. Sugie	·	5.8 km	MPC · JPL
46574	1992 DE_{8}	—	February 29, 1992	La Silla	UESAC	·	2.0 km	MPC · JPL
46575	1992 DS_{9}	—	February 29, 1992	La Silla	UESAC	·	3.0 km	MPC · JPL
46576	1992 EP_{10}	—	March 2, 1992	La Silla	UESAC	slow	4.9 km	MPC · JPL
46577	1992 EK_{12}	—	March 6, 1992	La Silla	UESAC	·	2.6 km	MPC · JPL
46578	1992 EC_{14}	—	March 2, 1992	La Silla	UESAC	LEO	4.5 km	MPC · JPL
46579	1992 EA_{26}	—	March 8, 1992	La Silla	UESAC	·	3.7 km	MPC · JPL
46580 Ryouichiirie	1992 GC	Ryouichiirie	April 2, 1992	Geisei	T. Seki	EUN	4.3 km	MPC · JPL
46581	1992 OK_{2}	—	July 26, 1992	La Silla	E. W. Elst	·	6.2 km	MPC · JPL
46582	1992 RR_{3}	—	September 2, 1992	La Silla	E. W. Elst	·	2.0 km	MPC · JPL
46583	1992 RW_{3}	—	September 2, 1992	La Silla	E. W. Elst	KOR	3.3 km	MPC · JPL
46584	1992 RN_{6}	—	September 2, 1992	La Silla	E. W. Elst	EOS	4.9 km	MPC · JPL
46585	1992 RD_{7}	—	September 2, 1992	La Silla	E. W. Elst	KOR	4.8 km	MPC · JPL
46586	1992 SH_{6}	—	September 26, 1992	Kitt Peak	Spacewatch	·	1.3 km	MPC · JPL
46587	1992 UJ_{1}	—	October 22, 1992	Kushiro	S. Ueda, H. Kaneda	·	2.1 km	MPC · JPL
46588 Murakamimasayuki	1992 WR	Murakamimasayuki	November 16, 1992	Kitami	K. Endate, K. Watanabe	·	3.2 km	MPC · JPL
46589 Fukusako	1992 WU	Fukusako	November 16, 1992	Kitami	K. Endate, K. Watanabe	·	3.0 km	MPC · JPL
46590 Akabeko	1992 WP_{1}	Akabeko	November 17, 1992	Kitami	K. Endate, K. Watanabe	EOS	9.1 km	MPC · JPL
46591	1992 WS_{1}	—	November 18, 1992	Dynic	A. Sugie	·	14 km	MPC · JPL
46592 Marinawatanabe	1992 YP	Marinawatanabe	December 16, 1992	Geisei	T. Seki	·	2.7 km	MPC · JPL
46593	1992 YP_{1}	—	December 18, 1992	Caussols	E. W. Elst	·	2.5 km	MPC · JPL
46594	1992 YP_{3}	—	December 24, 1992	Kitt Peak	Spacewatch	THM	8.4 km	MPC · JPL
46595 Kita-Kyushu	1992 YB_{4}	Kita-Kyushu	December 29, 1992	Geisei	T. Seki	·	2.7 km	MPC · JPL
46596 Tobata	1993 BD	Tobata	January 16, 1993	Geisei	T. Seki	·	4.0 km	MPC · JPL
46597	1993 DK_{2}	—	February 24, 1993	Siding Spring	R. H. McNaught	·	2.7 km	MPC · JPL
46598	1993 FT_{2}	—	March 19, 1993	Palomar	E. F. Helin	PHO	4.7 km	MPC · JPL
46599	1993 FP_{10}	—	March 17, 1993	La Silla	UESAC	NYS	5.6 km	MPC · JPL
46600	1993 FG_{14}	—	March 17, 1993	La Silla	UESAC	RAF	2.8 km	MPC · JPL

== 46601–46700 ==
back to top

Designation			Discovery			Properties		Ref
Permanent	Provisional	Named after	Date	Site	Discoverer(s)	Category	Diam.	Ref
46601	1993 FV_{15}	—	March 17, 1993	La Silla	UESAC	·	3.2 km	MPC · JPL
46602	1993 FP_{34}	—	March 19, 1993	La Silla	UESAC	·	9.2 km	MPC · JPL
46603	1993 FY_{41}	—	March 19, 1993	La Silla	UESAC	·	3.2 km	MPC · JPL
46604	1993 FH_{56}	—	March 17, 1993	La Silla	UESAC	·	3.2 km	MPC · JPL
46605	1993 HQ_{1}	—	April 18, 1993	Siding Spring	R. H. McNaught	H	1.3 km	MPC · JPL
46606	1993 LK_{2}	—	June 13, 1993	Kitt Peak	Spacewatch	·	2.6 km	MPC · JPL
46607	1993 OY_{12}	—	July 19, 1993	La Silla	E. W. Elst	MAR	5.8 km	MPC · JPL
46608 Yoshinokeiji	1993 RA_{2}	Yoshinokeiji	September 12, 1993	Kitami	K. Endate, K. Watanabe	·	4.9 km	MPC · JPL
46609 Fukuzumi	1993 SQ_{1}	Fukuzumi	September 16, 1993	Kitami	K. Endate, K. Watanabe	·	8.0 km	MPC · JPL
46610 Bésixdouze	1993 TQ_{1}	Bésixdouze	October 15, 1993	Kitami	K. Endate, K. Watanabe	·	2.1 km	MPC · JPL
46611	1993 TH_{4}	—	October 8, 1993	Kitt Peak	Spacewatch	AGN	4.3 km	MPC · JPL
46612	1993 TS_{16}	—	October 9, 1993	La Silla	E. W. Elst	·	5.2 km	MPC · JPL
46613	1993 TA_{17}	—	October 9, 1993	La Silla	E. W. Elst	·	6.2 km	MPC · JPL
46614	1993 TV_{27}	—	October 9, 1993	La Silla	E. W. Elst	·	7.1 km	MPC · JPL
46615	1993 TT_{32}	—	October 9, 1993	La Silla	E. W. Elst	·	4.5 km	MPC · JPL
46616	1994 AM	—	January 2, 1994	Oizumi	T. Kobayashi	·	7.6 km	MPC · JPL
46617	1994 BD_{1}	—	January 19, 1994	Oizumi	T. Kobayashi	·	2.4 km	MPC · JPL
46618	1994 CF_{16}	—	February 8, 1994	La Silla	E. W. Elst	·	8.2 km	MPC · JPL
46619	1994 CR_{16}	—	February 8, 1994	La Silla	E. W. Elst	NYS	2.3 km	MPC · JPL
46620	1994 EL_{1}	—	March 6, 1994	Oizumi	T. Kobayashi	·	3.9 km	MPC · JPL
46621	1994 EC_{7}	—	March 9, 1994	Caussols	E. W. Elst	·	2.5 km	MPC · JPL
46622	1994 EF_{7}	—	March 9, 1994	Caussols	E. W. Elst	·	2.4 km	MPC · JPL
46623	1994 GV_{10}	—	April 14, 1994	Palomar	PCAS	·	5.1 km	MPC · JPL
46624	1994 JV_{4}	—	May 4, 1994	Kitt Peak	Spacewatch	·	1.8 km	MPC · JPL
46625	1994 LM	—	June 5, 1994	Kitt Peak	Spacewatch	H	1.4 km	MPC · JPL
46626	1994 PL_{23}	—	August 12, 1994	La Silla	E. W. Elst	·	3.4 km	MPC · JPL
46627	1994 PG_{24}	—	August 12, 1994	La Silla	E. W. Elst	MAS	2.6 km	MPC · JPL
46628	1994 PD_{27}	—	August 12, 1994	La Silla	E. W. Elst	·	5.0 km	MPC · JPL
46629	1994 PS_{38}	—	August 10, 1994	La Silla	E. W. Elst	3:2 · SHU	16 km	MPC · JPL
46630	1994 SA_{11}	—	September 29, 1994	Kitt Peak	Spacewatch	·	2.1 km	MPC · JPL
46631 Hosoikatsumasa	1994 TQ_{3}	Hosoikatsumasa	October 5, 1994	Kitami	K. Endate, K. Watanabe	·	12 km	MPC · JPL
46632 RISE	1994 TN_{15}	RISE	October 14, 1994	Kiso	Sato, I., H. Araki	·	3.1 km	MPC · JPL
46633	1994 VH_{1}	—	November 4, 1994	Oizumi	T. Kobayashi	·	3.6 km	MPC · JPL
46634 Minamiaizumachi	1994 VR_{2}	Minamiaizumachi	November 1, 1994	Kitami	K. Endate, K. Watanabe	·	5.6 km	MPC · JPL
46635	1994 WK_{2}	—	November 28, 1994	Kushiro	S. Ueda, H. Kaneda	CLO ·	7.9 km	MPC · JPL
46636	1994 WD_{3}	—	November 28, 1994	Kushiro	S. Ueda, H. Kaneda	EUN	3.1 km	MPC · JPL
46637	1994 WJ_{12}	—	November 27, 1994	Caussols	E. W. Elst	·	4.8 km	MPC · JPL
46638	1995 BO_{3}	—	January 31, 1995	Oizumi	T. Kobayashi	·	5.9 km	MPC · JPL
46639	1995 BN_{4}	—	January 28, 1995	Kushiro	S. Ueda, H. Kaneda	ADE	10 km	MPC · JPL
46640	1995 DU	—	February 20, 1995	Oizumi	T. Kobayashi	·	5.7 km	MPC · JPL
46641	1995 EY	—	March 5, 1995	Kushiro	S. Ueda, H. Kaneda	·	4.1 km	MPC · JPL
46642	1995 FU_{4}	—	March 23, 1995	Kitt Peak	Spacewatch	EOS	4.5 km	MPC · JPL
46643 Yanase	1995 KM	Yanase	May 23, 1995	Kuma Kogen	A. Nakamura	EOS	6.0 km	MPC · JPL
46644 Lagia	1995 OF	Lagia	July 19, 1995	San Marcello	A. Boattini, L. Tesi	V	1.2 km	MPC · JPL
46645	1995 OP_{1}	—	July 19, 1995	Xinglong	SCAP	·	7.0 km	MPC · JPL
46646	1995 OC_{8}	—	July 25, 1995	Kitt Peak	Spacewatch	·	3.0 km	MPC · JPL
46647	1995 QP_{3}	—	August 28, 1995	Nachi-Katsuura	Y. Shimizu, T. Urata	·	2.4 km	MPC · JPL
46648	1995 SY	—	September 22, 1995	Stroncone	A. Vagnozzi	·	2.3 km	MPC · JPL
46649 Tsudahiroyuki	1995 SN_{4}	Tsudahiroyuki	September 20, 1995	Kitami	K. Endate, K. Watanabe	·	3.6 km	MPC · JPL
46650	1995 SR_{19}	—	September 18, 1995	Kitt Peak	Spacewatch	NYS	3.0 km	MPC · JPL
46651	1995 SV_{26}	—	September 19, 1995	Kitt Peak	Spacewatch	NYS	2.0 km	MPC · JPL
46652	1995 SV_{30}	—	September 20, 1995	Kitt Peak	Spacewatch	MRX	1.7 km	MPC · JPL
46653	1995 SE_{33}	—	September 21, 1995	Kitt Peak	Spacewatch	V	1.8 km	MPC · JPL
46654	1995 UB_{8}	—	October 26, 1995	Nachi-Katsuura	Y. Shimizu, T. Urata	·	5.3 km	MPC · JPL
46655	1995 UR_{9}	—	October 16, 1995	Kitt Peak	Spacewatch	·	2.5 km	MPC · JPL
46656	1995 WT_{6}	—	November 28, 1995	Stroncone	A. Vagnozzi	·	4.1 km	MPC · JPL
46657	1995 WM_{17}	—	November 17, 1995	Kitt Peak	Spacewatch	NYS	2.3 km	MPC · JPL
46658	1995 YH_{12}	—	December 19, 1995	Kitt Peak	Spacewatch	NYS	3.1 km	MPC · JPL
46659	1996 BB_{5}	—	January 16, 1996	Kitt Peak	Spacewatch	·	7.4 km	MPC · JPL
46660	1996 BM_{17}	—	January 25, 1996	Socorro	Lincoln Lab ETS	·	3.0 km	MPC · JPL
46661	1996 CP_{1}	—	February 12, 1996	Oizumi	T. Kobayashi	·	3.6 km	MPC · JPL
46662	1996 DO	—	February 19, 1996	Oizumi	T. Kobayashi	·	5.2 km	MPC · JPL
46663	1996 DR_{2}	—	February 26, 1996	Kleť	Kleť	·	3.6 km	MPC · JPL
46664	1996 EK_{10}	—	March 12, 1996	Kitt Peak	Spacewatch	·	2.9 km	MPC · JPL
46665	1996 FD	—	March 16, 1996	Haleakala	NEAT	·	5.3 km	MPC · JPL
46666	1996 FX_{21}	—	March 24, 1996	La Silla	E. W. Elst	KOR	3.3 km	MPC · JPL
46667	1996 HM_{2}	—	April 18, 1996	Siding Spring	R. H. McNaught	MIS	8.5 km	MPC · JPL
46668	1996 HM_{10}	—	April 17, 1996	La Silla	E. W. Elst	JUN	3.1 km	MPC · JPL
46669 Wangyongzhi	1996 LK	Wangyongzhi	June 6, 1996	Xinglong	SCAP	·	8.7 km	MPC · JPL
46670	1996 NU	—	July 15, 1996	Lime Creek	R. Linderholm	URS	20 km	MPC · JPL
46671	1996 NW_{3}	—	July 14, 1996	La Silla	E. W. Elst	·	5.3 km	MPC · JPL
46672	1996 OA	—	July 16, 1996	Kleť	Kleť	·	8.6 km	MPC · JPL
46673	1996 OL_{2}	—	July 23, 1996	Campo Imperatore	A. Boattini, A. Di Paola	·	8.1 km	MPC · JPL
46674	1996 PY_{8}	—	August 8, 1996	La Silla	E. W. Elst	·	4.3 km	MPC · JPL
46675	1996 QO	—	August 17, 1996	Haleakala	NEAT	THM	8.0 km	MPC · JPL
46676	1996 RF_{29}	—	September 11, 1996	La Silla	Uppsala-DLR Trojan Survey	L4	18 km	MPC · JPL
46677	1996 TK_{6}	—	October 7, 1996	Xinglong	SCAP	·	6.8 km	MPC · JPL
46678	1996 TZ_{8}	—	October 12, 1996	Catalina Station	T. B. Spahr	(10654)	15 km	MPC · JPL
46679	1996 TE_{30}	—	October 7, 1996	Kitt Peak	Spacewatch	·	2.7 km	MPC · JPL
46680	1996 YV	—	December 20, 1996	Oizumi	T. Kobayashi	·	2.4 km	MPC · JPL
46681	1997 AN_{5}	—	January 7, 1997	Oizumi	T. Kobayashi	·	2.7 km	MPC · JPL
46682	1997 AV_{5}	—	January 1, 1997	Xinglong	SCAP	·	3.1 km	MPC · JPL
46683	1997 AK_{8}	—	January 2, 1997	Kitt Peak	Spacewatch	·	2.6 km	MPC · JPL
46684	1997 AX_{8}	—	January 2, 1997	Kitt Peak	Spacewatch	·	1.8 km	MPC · JPL
46685	1997 AG_{13}	—	January 11, 1997	Oizumi	T. Kobayashi	·	4.2 km	MPC · JPL
46686 Anitasohus	1997 AS_{13}	Anitasohus	January 10, 1997	Haleakala	NEAT	·	2.0 km	MPC · JPL
46687	1997 AP_{18}	—	January 15, 1997	Farra d'Isonzo	Farra d'Isonzo	NYS	2.7 km	MPC · JPL
46688	1997 AB_{19}	—	January 10, 1997	Kitt Peak	Spacewatch	NYS	3.3 km	MPC · JPL
46689 Hakuryuko	1997 AL_{19}	Hakuryuko	January 13, 1997	Nanyo	T. Okuni	·	2.8 km	MPC · JPL
46690	1997 AN_{23}	—	January 14, 1997	Church Stretton	S. P. Laurie	·	1.8 km	MPC · JPL
46691 Ghezzi	1997 BK_{3}	Ghezzi	January 30, 1997	Sormano	P. Sicoli, Giuliani, V.	·	2.8 km	MPC · JPL
46692 Taormina	1997 CW_{1}	Taormina	February 2, 1997	Kleť	J. Tichá, M. Tichý	·	3.0 km	MPC · JPL
46693	1997 CK_{4}	—	February 4, 1997	Oizumi	T. Kobayashi	V	2.4 km	MPC · JPL
46694	1997 CS_{9}	—	February 1, 1997	Kitt Peak	Spacewatch	V	1.2 km	MPC · JPL
46695	1997 CX_{13}	—	February 4, 1997	Cloudcroft	W. Offutt	·	2.9 km	MPC · JPL
46696	1997 CF_{20}	—	February 12, 1997	Oizumi	T. Kobayashi	V	1.7 km	MPC · JPL
46697	1997 CM_{20}	—	February 12, 1997	Oizumi	T. Kobayashi	NYS	3.1 km	MPC · JPL
46698	1997 CT_{25}	—	February 13, 1997	Kitt Peak	Spacewatch	V	1.8 km	MPC · JPL
46699	1997 CL_{26}	—	February 14, 1997	Oizumi	T. Kobayashi	·	4.2 km	MPC · JPL
46700	1997 CK_{27}	—	February 8, 1997	Haleakala	NEAT	·	2.1 km	MPC · JPL

== 46701–46800 ==
back to top

Designation			Discovery			Properties		Ref
Permanent	Provisional	Named after	Date	Site	Discoverer(s)	Category	Diam.	Ref
46701 Interrante	1997 CP_{29}	Interrante	February 7, 1997	Cima Ekar	U. Munari, M. Tombelli	·	3.3 km	MPC · JPL
46702 Linapucci	1997 DX	Linapucci	February 28, 1997	Montelupo	M. Tombelli, G. Forti	·	2.2 km	MPC · JPL
46703	1997 EC	—	March 1, 1997	Oizumi	T. Kobayashi	·	2.8 km	MPC · JPL
46704	1997 EL_{5}	—	March 4, 1997	Kitt Peak	Spacewatch	NYS	3.2 km	MPC · JPL
46705	1997 EE_{37}	—	March 5, 1997	Socorro	LINEAR	·	2.4 km	MPC · JPL
46706	1997 ET_{41}	—	March 10, 1997	Socorro	LINEAR	·	1.7 km	MPC · JPL
46707	1997 FH_{3}	—	March 31, 1997	Socorro	LINEAR	·	2.4 km	MPC · JPL
46708	1997 FP_{4}	—	March 31, 1997	Socorro	LINEAR	·	2.3 km	MPC · JPL
46709	1997 GU_{6}	—	April 2, 1997	Socorro	LINEAR	·	4.1 km	MPC · JPL
46710	1997 GB_{7}	—	April 2, 1997	Socorro	LINEAR	·	5.3 km	MPC · JPL
46711	1997 GW_{7}	—	April 2, 1997	Socorro	LINEAR	NYS	3.2 km	MPC · JPL
46712	1997 GY_{14}	—	April 3, 1997	Socorro	LINEAR	·	4.1 km	MPC · JPL
46713	1997 GO_{19}	—	April 5, 1997	Socorro	LINEAR	·	3.3 km	MPC · JPL
46714	1997 HF_{7}	—	April 30, 1997	Socorro	LINEAR	·	2.1 km	MPC · JPL
46715	1997 HE_{13}	—	April 30, 1997	Socorro	LINEAR	THM	5.0 km	MPC · JPL
46716	1997 NX	—	July 3, 1997	Dynic	A. Sugie	·	2.6 km	MPC · JPL
46717	1997 NY_{5}	—	July 7, 1997	Kitt Peak	Spacewatch	·	7.8 km	MPC · JPL
46718	1997 NK_{6}	—	July 9, 1997	Farra d'Isonzo	Farra d'Isonzo	·	7.1 km	MPC · JPL
46719 Plantade	1997 PJ	Plantade	August 1, 1997	Pises	Pises	·	5.7 km	MPC · JPL
46720 Pierostroppa	1997 PO_{4}	Pierostroppa	August 13, 1997	San Marcello	L. Tesi, A. Boattini	·	3.1 km	MPC · JPL
46721	1997 QW_{3}	—	August 30, 1997	Caussols	ODAS	·	6.3 km	MPC · JPL
46722 Ireneadler	1997 RA_{1}	Ireneadler	September 2, 1997	Ondřejov	P. Pravec, L. Kotková	slow	5.9 km	MPC · JPL
46723	1997 RS_{2}	—	September 5, 1997	Prescott	P. G. Comba	·	5.3 km	MPC · JPL
46724	1997 SU_{7}	—	September 23, 1997	Kitt Peak	Spacewatch	·	5.2 km	MPC · JPL
46725	1997 SS_{13}	—	September 28, 1997	Kitt Peak	Spacewatch	EOS	6.8 km	MPC · JPL
46726	1997 SA_{22}	—	September 27, 1997	Kitt Peak	Spacewatch	·	8.7 km	MPC · JPL
46727 Hidekimatsuyama	1997 SN_{25}	Hidekimatsuyama	September 30, 1997	Nanyo	T. Okuni	KOR	4.8 km	MPC · JPL
46728	1997 SJ_{29}	—	September 30, 1997	Kitt Peak	Spacewatch	EOS	5.9 km	MPC · JPL
46729	1997 SJ_{31}	—	September 28, 1997	Kitt Peak	Spacewatch	·	6.5 km	MPC · JPL
46730	1997 TY_{16}	—	October 9, 1997	Kleť	Kleť	·	13 km	MPC · JPL
46731 Prieurblanc	1997 TB_{18}	Prieurblanc	October 4, 1997	Hottviller	C. Demeautis, Buttani, P.	EOS	5.9 km	MPC · JPL
46732	1997 TD_{19}	—	October 8, 1997	Uenohara	N. Kawasato	KOR	4.0 km	MPC · JPL
46733	1997 TA_{20}	—	October 2, 1997	Kitt Peak	Spacewatch	HYG	6.1 km	MPC · JPL
46734	1997 TL_{25}	—	October 9, 1997	Xinglong	SCAP	·	7.7 km	MPC · JPL
46735	1997 UG_{1}	—	October 21, 1997	Nachi-Katsuura	Y. Shimizu, T. Urata	EOS	7.9 km	MPC · JPL
46736	1997 UD_{21}	—	October 31, 1997	Xinglong	SCAP	HYG	5.6 km	MPC · JPL
46737 Anpanman	1997 VO	Anpanman	November 1, 1997	Kuma Kogen	A. Nakamura	THM	8.1 km	MPC · JPL
46738	1997 VF_{1}	—	November 1, 1997	Oohira	T. Urata	·	6.4 km	MPC · JPL
46739	1997 WH_{10}	—	November 21, 1997	Kitt Peak	Spacewatch	KOR	3.3 km	MPC · JPL
46740	1997 WQ_{14}	—	November 23, 1997	Kitt Peak	Spacewatch	·	1.9 km	MPC · JPL
46741	1997 WM_{15}	—	November 23, 1997	Kitt Peak	Spacewatch	THM	6.8 km	MPC · JPL
46742	1997 WQ_{15}	—	November 23, 1997	Kitt Peak	Spacewatch	HYG	6.9 km	MPC · JPL
46743	1997 WE_{36}	—	November 29, 1997	Socorro	LINEAR	HYG	9.2 km	MPC · JPL
46744	1997 WP_{38}	—	November 29, 1997	Socorro	LINEAR	·	9.7 km	MPC · JPL
46745	1997 WK_{47}	—	November 26, 1997	Socorro	LINEAR	·	5.2 km	MPC · JPL
46746	1998 BX_{24}	—	January 28, 1998	Oizumi	T. Kobayashi	·	2.6 km	MPC · JPL
46747	1998 DF_{9}	—	February 22, 1998	Haleakala	NEAT	·	2.1 km	MPC · JPL
46748 Giusacayrel	1998 DN_{23}	Giusacayrel	February 27, 1998	Caussols	ODAS	·	1.9 km	MPC · JPL
46749	1998 DM_{33}	—	February 22, 1998	Kitt Peak	Spacewatch	·	4.9 km	MPC · JPL
46750	1998 EL_{14}	—	March 1, 1998	La Silla	E. W. Elst	·	4.5 km	MPC · JPL
46751	1998 FD_{30}	—	March 20, 1998	Socorro	LINEAR	·	2.7 km	MPC · JPL
46752	1998 FM_{35}	—	March 20, 1998	Socorro	LINEAR	·	4.6 km	MPC · JPL
46753	1998 FL_{41}	—	March 20, 1998	Socorro	LINEAR	·	1.5 km	MPC · JPL
46754	1998 FX_{49}	—	March 20, 1998	Socorro	LINEAR	·	2.3 km	MPC · JPL
46755	1998 FL_{50}	—	March 20, 1998	Socorro	LINEAR	·	2.8 km	MPC · JPL
46756	1998 FP_{55}	—	March 20, 1998	Socorro	LINEAR	MAS	2.2 km	MPC · JPL
46757	1998 FX_{57}	—	March 20, 1998	Socorro	LINEAR	·	2.6 km	MPC · JPL
46758	1998 FQ_{59}	—	March 20, 1998	Socorro	LINEAR	·	1.7 km	MPC · JPL
46759	1998 FK_{65}	—	March 20, 1998	Socorro	LINEAR	·	2.6 km	MPC · JPL
46760	1998 FK_{67}	—	March 20, 1998	Socorro	LINEAR	·	3.1 km	MPC · JPL
46761	1998 FC_{71}	—	March 20, 1998	Socorro	LINEAR	·	2.0 km	MPC · JPL
46762	1998 FM_{78}	—	March 24, 1998	Socorro	LINEAR	·	2.5 km	MPC · JPL
46763	1998 FE_{79}	—	March 24, 1998	Socorro	LINEAR	PHO	6.4 km	MPC · JPL
46764	1998 FE_{95}	—	March 24, 1998	Socorro	LINEAR	·	1.7 km	MPC · JPL
46765	1998 FN_{109}	—	March 31, 1998	Socorro	LINEAR	·	2.9 km	MPC · JPL
46766	1998 FU_{115}	—	March 31, 1998	Socorro	LINEAR	·	1.7 km	MPC · JPL
46767	1998 FX_{115}	—	March 31, 1998	Socorro	LINEAR	·	3.3 km	MPC · JPL
46768	1998 FK_{122}	—	March 20, 1998	Socorro	LINEAR	·	1.5 km	MPC · JPL
46769	1998 HJ_{2}	—	April 19, 1998	Kitt Peak	Spacewatch	·	1.7 km	MPC · JPL
46770	1998 HY_{5}	—	April 21, 1998	Caussols	ODAS	·	1.7 km	MPC · JPL
46771	1998 HM_{7}	—	April 23, 1998	Socorro	LINEAR	·	3.8 km	MPC · JPL
46772	1998 HD_{8}	—	April 21, 1998	Bédoin	P. Antonini	·	2.2 km	MPC · JPL
46773	1998 HZ_{12}	—	April 18, 1998	Socorro	LINEAR	·	2.4 km	MPC · JPL
46774	1998 HO_{30}	—	April 20, 1998	Socorro	LINEAR	·	2.8 km	MPC · JPL
46775	1998 HC_{42}	—	April 24, 1998	Kitt Peak	Spacewatch	·	2.3 km	MPC · JPL
46776	1998 HN_{49}	—	April 24, 1998	Kleť	Kleť	·	2.7 km	MPC · JPL
46777	1998 HO_{51}	—	April 25, 1998	Anderson Mesa	LONEOS	·	2.0 km	MPC · JPL
46778	1998 HR_{51}	—	April 30, 1998	Anderson Mesa	LONEOS	·	2.2 km	MPC · JPL
46779	1998 HY_{51}	—	April 30, 1998	Anderson Mesa	LONEOS	·	2.8 km	MPC · JPL
46780	1998 HH_{52}	—	April 30, 1998	Anderson Mesa	LONEOS	·	3.9 km	MPC · JPL
46781	1998 HH_{86}	—	April 21, 1998	Socorro	LINEAR	·	1.4 km	MPC · JPL
46782	1998 HJ_{98}	—	April 21, 1998	Socorro	LINEAR	·	2.3 km	MPC · JPL
46783	1998 HU_{101}	—	April 24, 1998	Reedy Creek	J. Broughton	·	1.8 km	MPC · JPL
46784	1998 HK_{117}	—	April 23, 1998	Socorro	LINEAR	·	1.9 km	MPC · JPL
46785	1998 HQ_{117}	—	April 23, 1998	Socorro	LINEAR	·	2.0 km	MPC · JPL
46786	1998 HH_{125}	—	April 23, 1998	Socorro	LINEAR	·	2.2 km	MPC · JPL
46787	1998 HL_{129}	—	April 19, 1998	Socorro	LINEAR	·	4.9 km	MPC · JPL
46788	1998 HP_{139}	—	April 21, 1998	Socorro	LINEAR	·	2.3 km	MPC · JPL
46789	1998 HG_{141}	—	April 21, 1998	Socorro	LINEAR	·	2.0 km	MPC · JPL
46790	1998 HG_{149}	—	April 25, 1998	La Silla	E. W. Elst	(883)	2.6 km	MPC · JPL
46791	1998 HW_{149}	—	April 25, 1998	La Silla	E. W. Elst	·	3.2 km	MPC · JPL
46792	1998 HK_{153}	—	April 24, 1998	Socorro	LINEAR	·	6.0 km	MPC · JPL
46793 Phinney	1998 JP	Phinney	May 1, 1998	Haleakala	NEAT	·	2.2 km	MPC · JPL
46794	1998 JW_{2}	—	May 1, 1998	Anderson Mesa	LONEOS	·	2.9 km	MPC · JPL
46795	1998 JW_{4}	—	May 1, 1998	Socorro	LINEAR	·	2.3 km	MPC · JPL
46796 Mamigasakigawa	1998 KU	Mamigasakigawa	May 19, 1998	Nanyo	T. Okuni	·	3.5 km	MPC · JPL
46797	1998 KA_{4}	—	May 22, 1998	Anderson Mesa	LONEOS	·	2.4 km	MPC · JPL
46798	1998 KU_{4}	—	May 22, 1998	Anderson Mesa	LONEOS	V	2.6 km	MPC · JPL
46799	1998 KY_{8}	—	May 23, 1998	Anderson Mesa	LONEOS	·	3.7 km	MPC · JPL
46800	1998 KH_{27}	—	May 22, 1998	Socorro	LINEAR	·	4.5 km	MPC · JPL

== 46801–46900 ==
back to top

Designation			Discovery			Properties		Ref
Permanent	Provisional	Named after	Date	Site	Discoverer(s)	Category	Diam.	Ref
46801	1998 KP_{29}	—	May 22, 1998	Socorro	LINEAR	·	1.6 km	MPC · JPL
46802	1998 KX_{30}	—	May 22, 1998	Socorro	LINEAR	·	1.9 km	MPC · JPL
46803	1998 KL_{33}	—	May 22, 1998	Socorro	LINEAR	·	2.1 km	MPC · JPL
46804	1998 KH_{34}	—	May 22, 1998	Socorro	LINEAR	·	2.4 km	MPC · JPL
46805	1998 KX_{34}	—	May 22, 1998	Socorro	LINEAR	·	2.3 km	MPC · JPL
46806	1998 KJ_{39}	—	May 22, 1998	Socorro	LINEAR	·	2.7 km	MPC · JPL
46807	1998 KT_{45}	—	May 22, 1998	Socorro	LINEAR	·	2.7 km	MPC · JPL
46808	1998 KX_{45}	—	May 22, 1998	Socorro	LINEAR	·	2.1 km	MPC · JPL
46809	1998 KD_{47}	—	May 22, 1998	Socorro	LINEAR	·	2.7 km	MPC · JPL
46810	1998 KK_{47}	—	May 22, 1998	Socorro	LINEAR	BAP · fast	3.2 km	MPC · JPL
46811	1998 KY_{47}	—	May 22, 1998	Socorro	LINEAR	·	2.6 km	MPC · JPL
46812	1998 KO_{64}	—	May 22, 1998	Socorro	LINEAR	·	2.1 km	MPC · JPL
46813	1998 KQ_{64}	—	May 22, 1998	Socorro	LINEAR	·	3.1 km	MPC · JPL
46814	1998 KS_{64}	—	May 22, 1998	Socorro	LINEAR	·	3.1 km	MPC · JPL
46815	1998 MG_{3}	—	June 21, 1998	San Marcello	L. Tesi, A. Boattini	·	2.6 km	MPC · JPL
46816	1998 MR_{13}	—	June 24, 1998	Socorro	LINEAR	PHO	4.3 km	MPC · JPL
46817	1998 MG_{16}	—	June 24, 1998	Kitt Peak	Spacewatch	NYS	2.4 km	MPC · JPL
46818	1998 MZ_{24}	—	June 24, 1998	Socorro	LINEAR	·	5.4 km	MPC · JPL
46819	1998 MH_{27}	—	June 24, 1998	Socorro	LINEAR	·	5.0 km	MPC · JPL
46820	1998 MK_{28}	—	June 24, 1998	Socorro	LINEAR	NYS ·	3.1 km	MPC · JPL
46821	1998 MV_{31}	—	June 24, 1998	Socorro	LINEAR	PHO	3.9 km	MPC · JPL
46822	1998 MQ_{32}	—	June 24, 1998	Socorro	LINEAR	EUN	4.5 km	MPC · JPL
46823	1998 MN_{35}	—	June 24, 1998	Socorro	LINEAR	·	3.0 km	MPC · JPL
46824 Tambora	1998 MT_{38}	Tambora	June 26, 1998	La Silla	E. W. Elst	V	1.7 km	MPC · JPL
46825	1998 OJ_{2}	—	July 25, 1998	Prescott	P. G. Comba	·	4.7 km	MPC · JPL
46826	1998 OC_{7}	—	July 28, 1998	Xinglong	SCAP	·	3.9 km	MPC · JPL
46827	1998 OJ_{7}	—	July 28, 1998	Xinglong	SCAP	V	2.6 km	MPC · JPL
46828	1998 OU_{10}	—	July 26, 1998	La Silla	E. W. Elst	·	4.6 km	MPC · JPL
46829 McMahon	1998 OS_{14}	McMahon	July 26, 1998	La Silla	E. W. Elst	moon	4.2 km	MPC · JPL
46830	1998 PU	—	August 15, 1998	Prescott	P. G. Comba	·	5.0 km	MPC · JPL
46831	1998 QH	—	August 17, 1998	Prescott	P. G. Comba	·	4.5 km	MPC · JPL
46832	1998 QQ_{1}	—	August 17, 1998	Višnjan Observatory	Višnjan	·	5.5 km	MPC · JPL
46833	1998 QB_{8}	—	August 17, 1998	Socorro	LINEAR	V	1.9 km	MPC · JPL
46834	1998 QL_{11}	—	August 17, 1998	Socorro	LINEAR	·	3.4 km	MPC · JPL
46835	1998 QR_{11}	—	August 17, 1998	Socorro	LINEAR	·	3.6 km	MPC · JPL
46836	1998 QM_{12}	—	August 17, 1998	Socorro	LINEAR	·	4.8 km	MPC · JPL
46837	1998 QB_{13}	—	August 17, 1998	Socorro	LINEAR	V	2.3 km	MPC · JPL
46838	1998 QS_{13}	—	August 17, 1998	Socorro	LINEAR	·	3.0 km	MPC · JPL
46839	1998 QB_{14}	—	August 17, 1998	Socorro	LINEAR	·	3.2 km	MPC · JPL
46840	1998 QZ_{17}	—	August 17, 1998	Socorro	LINEAR	fast?	4.3 km	MPC · JPL
46841	1998 QE_{19}	—	August 17, 1998	Socorro	LINEAR	·	2.4 km	MPC · JPL
46842	1998 QK_{20}	—	August 17, 1998	Socorro	LINEAR	·	3.6 km	MPC · JPL
46843	1998 QO_{22}	—	August 17, 1998	Socorro	LINEAR	·	4.1 km	MPC · JPL
46844	1998 QW_{22}	—	August 17, 1998	Socorro	LINEAR	·	2.7 km	MPC · JPL
46845	1998 QB_{24}	—	August 17, 1998	Socorro	LINEAR	V	2.4 km	MPC · JPL
46846	1998 QN_{24}	—	August 17, 1998	Socorro	LINEAR	·	2.3 km	MPC · JPL
46847	1998 QM_{26}	—	August 25, 1998	Woomera	F. B. Zoltowski	NYS	2.5 km	MPC · JPL
46848	1998 QQ_{35}	—	August 17, 1998	Socorro	LINEAR	NYS	4.2 km	MPC · JPL
46849	1998 QD_{36}	—	August 17, 1998	Socorro	LINEAR	·	2.7 km	MPC · JPL
46850	1998 QO_{37}	—	August 17, 1998	Socorro	LINEAR	·	2.5 km	MPC · JPL
46851	1998 QN_{39}	—	August 17, 1998	Socorro	LINEAR	·	3.3 km	MPC · JPL
46852	1998 QC_{41}	—	August 17, 1998	Socorro	LINEAR	·	4.2 km	MPC · JPL
46853	1998 QC_{42}	—	August 17, 1998	Socorro	LINEAR	·	4.2 km	MPC · JPL
46854	1998 QY_{42}	—	August 17, 1998	Socorro	LINEAR	·	6.3 km	MPC · JPL
46855	1998 QR_{44}	—	August 17, 1998	Socorro	LINEAR	·	3.0 km	MPC · JPL
46856	1998 QK_{45}	—	August 17, 1998	Socorro	LINEAR	·	3.8 km	MPC · JPL
46857	1998 QN_{45}	—	August 17, 1998	Socorro	LINEAR	PHO	3.3 km	MPC · JPL
46858	1998 QB_{50}	—	August 17, 1998	Socorro	LINEAR	·	5.0 km	MPC · JPL
46859	1998 QB_{51}	—	August 17, 1998	Socorro	LINEAR	·	3.4 km	MPC · JPL
46860	1998 QP_{60}	—	August 27, 1998	Ondřejov	L. Kotková	·	4.1 km	MPC · JPL
46861	1998 QJ_{73}	—	August 24, 1998	Socorro	LINEAR	·	3.8 km	MPC · JPL
46862	1998 QP_{74}	—	August 24, 1998	Socorro	LINEAR	EUN	3.7 km	MPC · JPL
46863	1998 QE_{75}	—	August 24, 1998	Socorro	LINEAR	·	4.2 km	MPC · JPL
46864	1998 QV_{86}	—	August 24, 1998	Socorro	LINEAR	·	5.1 km	MPC · JPL
46865	1998 QZ_{86}	—	August 24, 1998	Socorro	LINEAR	·	3.2 km	MPC · JPL
46866	1998 QW_{87}	—	August 24, 1998	Socorro	LINEAR	·	2.6 km	MPC · JPL
46867	1998 QN_{91}	—	August 28, 1998	Socorro	LINEAR	·	8.6 km	MPC · JPL
46868	1998 QM_{93}	—	August 28, 1998	Socorro	LINEAR	·	4.3 km	MPC · JPL
46869	1998 QC_{97}	—	August 23, 1998	Socorro	LINEAR	·	3.5 km	MPC · JPL
46870	1998 QC_{100}	—	August 26, 1998	La Silla	E. W. Elst	·	4.2 km	MPC · JPL
46871	1998 QF_{100}	—	August 26, 1998	La Silla	E. W. Elst	·	7.0 km	MPC · JPL
46872	1998 QP_{101}	—	August 26, 1998	La Silla	E. W. Elst	·	4.1 km	MPC · JPL
46873	1998 QZ_{101}	—	August 26, 1998	La Silla	E. W. Elst	·	5.4 km	MPC · JPL
46874	1998 QC_{103}	—	August 26, 1998	La Silla	E. W. Elst	·	4.4 km	MPC · JPL
46875	1998 QD_{104}	—	August 26, 1998	La Silla	E. W. Elst	·	4.5 km	MPC · JPL
46876	1998 QV_{104}	—	August 26, 1998	La Silla	E. W. Elst	·	4.2 km	MPC · JPL
46877	1998 RU	—	September 12, 1998	Prescott	P. G. Comba	·	3.0 km	MPC · JPL
46878	1998 RD_{4}	—	September 14, 1998	Socorro	LINEAR	·	3.5 km	MPC · JPL
46879	1998 RZ_{4}	—	September 14, 1998	Socorro	LINEAR	H	1.8 km	MPC · JPL
46880	1998 RC_{5}	—	September 15, 1998	Višnjan Observatory	Višnjan	(5)	3.0 km	MPC · JPL
46881	1998 RU_{5}	—	September 15, 1998	Anderson Mesa	LONEOS	·	2.9 km	MPC · JPL
46882	1998 RL_{9}	—	September 13, 1998	Kitt Peak	Spacewatch	·	2.3 km	MPC · JPL
46883	1998 RT_{15}	—	September 1, 1998	Xinglong	SCAP	·	3.0 km	MPC · JPL
46884	1998 RY_{16}	—	September 14, 1998	Socorro	LINEAR	NYS	3.8 km	MPC · JPL
46885	1998 RR_{18}	—	September 14, 1998	Socorro	LINEAR	·	2.8 km	MPC · JPL
46886	1998 RU_{29}	—	September 14, 1998	Socorro	LINEAR	(5)	2.4 km	MPC · JPL
46887	1998 RV_{29}	—	September 14, 1998	Socorro	LINEAR	·	3.9 km	MPC · JPL
46888	1998 RG_{37}	—	September 14, 1998	Socorro	LINEAR	·	4.6 km	MPC · JPL
46889	1998 RD_{43}	—	September 14, 1998	Socorro	LINEAR	·	4.9 km	MPC · JPL
46890	1998 RK_{48}	—	September 14, 1998	Socorro	LINEAR	·	2.8 km	MPC · JPL
46891	1998 RV_{50}	—	September 14, 1998	Socorro	LINEAR	·	3.0 km	MPC · JPL
46892	1998 RJ_{51}	—	September 14, 1998	Socorro	LINEAR	·	4.8 km	MPC · JPL
46893	1998 RF_{52}	—	September 14, 1998	Socorro	LINEAR	·	3.8 km	MPC · JPL
46894	1998 RG_{52}	—	September 14, 1998	Socorro	LINEAR	·	4.5 km	MPC · JPL
46895	1998 RX_{52}	—	September 14, 1998	Socorro	LINEAR	·	2.3 km	MPC · JPL
46896	1998 RR_{53}	—	September 14, 1998	Socorro	LINEAR	·	2.5 km	MPC · JPL
46897	1998 RP_{55}	—	September 14, 1998	Socorro	LINEAR	·	3.1 km	MPC · JPL
46898	1998 RW_{57}	—	September 14, 1998	Socorro	LINEAR	·	2.4 km	MPC · JPL
46899	1998 RF_{60}	—	September 14, 1998	Socorro	LINEAR	·	3.3 km	MPC · JPL
46900	1998 RG_{60}	—	September 14, 1998	Socorro	LINEAR	(5)	2.4 km	MPC · JPL

== 46901–47000 ==
back to top

Designation			Discovery			Properties		Ref
Permanent	Provisional	Named after	Date	Site	Discoverer(s)	Category	Diam.	Ref
46901	1998 RQ_{60}	—	September 14, 1998	Socorro	LINEAR	·	5.5 km	MPC · JPL
46902	1998 RY_{60}	—	September 14, 1998	Socorro	LINEAR	EUN	4.0 km	MPC · JPL
46903	1998 RQ_{61}	—	September 14, 1998	Socorro	LINEAR	(5)	4.2 km	MPC · JPL
46904	1998 RG_{63}	—	September 14, 1998	Socorro	LINEAR	·	3.5 km	MPC · JPL
46905	1998 RT_{63}	—	September 14, 1998	Socorro	LINEAR	·	3.7 km	MPC · JPL
46906	1998 RG_{66}	—	September 14, 1998	Socorro	LINEAR	·	2.8 km	MPC · JPL
46907	1998 RQ_{70}	—	September 14, 1998	Socorro	LINEAR	·	7.2 km	MPC · JPL
46908	1998 RV_{71}	—	September 14, 1998	Socorro	LINEAR	·	3.5 km	MPC · JPL
46909	1998 RF_{72}	—	September 14, 1998	Socorro	LINEAR	MAR	4.1 km	MPC · JPL
46910	1998 RM_{72}	—	September 14, 1998	Socorro	LINEAR	·	2.1 km	MPC · JPL
46911	1998 RW_{72}	—	September 14, 1998	Socorro	LINEAR	·	2.3 km	MPC · JPL
46912	1998 RY_{72}	—	September 14, 1998	Socorro	LINEAR	·	4.5 km	MPC · JPL
46913	1998 RD_{74}	—	September 14, 1998	Socorro	LINEAR	·	5.8 km	MPC · JPL
46914	1998 RX_{74}	—	September 14, 1998	Socorro	LINEAR	MIS	6.4 km	MPC · JPL
46915	1998 RK_{75}	—	September 14, 1998	Socorro	LINEAR	·	6.3 km	MPC · JPL
46916	1998 RG_{77}	—	September 14, 1998	Socorro	LINEAR	·	2.8 km	MPC · JPL
46917 Rogercayrel	1998 SA	Rogercayrel	September 16, 1998	Caussols	ODAS	·	2.7 km	MPC · JPL
46918	1998 SC	—	September 16, 1998	Woomera	F. B. Zoltowski	CLO	9.4 km	MPC · JPL
46919	1998 SN_{3}	—	September 17, 1998	Caussols	ODAS	MRX	2.6 km	MPC · JPL
46920 Suzanedwards	1998 SX_{12}	Suzanedwards	September 23, 1998	Catalina	CSS	·	7.0 km	MPC · JPL
46921	1998 SW_{13}	—	September 16, 1998	Anderson Mesa	LONEOS	·	5.5 km	MPC · JPL
46922	1998 ST_{19}	—	September 20, 1998	Kitt Peak	Spacewatch	·	3.9 km	MPC · JPL
46923	1998 SG_{24}	—	September 17, 1998	Anderson Mesa	LONEOS	·	4.8 km	MPC · JPL
46924	1998 SP_{26}	—	September 24, 1998	Kleť	Kleť	·	2.2 km	MPC · JPL
46925 Bradyharan	1998 SS_{27}	Bradyharan	September 25, 1998	Catalina	CSS	·	16 km	MPC · JPL
46926	1998 SR_{33}	—	September 26, 1998	Socorro	LINEAR	·	4.0 km	MPC · JPL
46927	1998 SP_{54}	—	September 16, 1998	Anderson Mesa	LONEOS	·	2.8 km	MPC · JPL
46928	1998 SJ_{57}	—	September 17, 1998	Anderson Mesa	LONEOS	EUN	3.9 km	MPC · JPL
46929	1998 SO_{57}	—	September 17, 1998	Anderson Mesa	LONEOS	·	3.6 km	MPC · JPL
46930	1998 SV_{58}	—	September 17, 1998	Anderson Mesa	LONEOS	·	4.5 km	MPC · JPL
46931	1998 SW_{59}	—	September 17, 1998	Anderson Mesa	LONEOS	·	1.8 km	MPC · JPL
46932	1998 SZ_{60}	—	September 17, 1998	Anderson Mesa	LONEOS	(5)	2.3 km	MPC · JPL
46933	1998 SP_{62}	—	September 20, 1998	Xinglong	SCAP	PAD	6.0 km	MPC · JPL
46934	1998 SN_{63}	—	September 29, 1998	Xinglong	SCAP	·	3.0 km	MPC · JPL
46935	1998 SL_{65}	—	September 20, 1998	La Silla	E. W. Elst	·	5.1 km	MPC · JPL
46936	1998 SN_{67}	—	September 20, 1998	La Silla	E. W. Elst	·	7.7 km	MPC · JPL
46937	1998 SA_{71}	—	September 21, 1998	La Silla	E. W. Elst	·	3.7 km	MPC · JPL
46938	1998 SP_{71}	—	September 21, 1998	La Silla	E. W. Elst	·	4.0 km	MPC · JPL
46939	1998 SM_{73}	—	September 21, 1998	La Silla	E. W. Elst	MRX	3.0 km	MPC · JPL
46940	1998 SK_{74}	—	September 21, 1998	La Silla	E. W. Elst	·	4.9 km	MPC · JPL
46941	1998 SQ_{74}	—	September 21, 1998	La Silla	E. W. Elst	AGN	4.2 km	MPC · JPL
46942	1998 SL_{75}	—	September 21, 1998	La Silla	E. W. Elst	MIS	4.8 km	MPC · JPL
46943	1998 SZ_{99}	—	September 26, 1998	Socorro	LINEAR	EUN	3.5 km	MPC · JPL
46944	1998 SO_{102}	—	September 26, 1998	Socorro	LINEAR	·	9.2 km	MPC · JPL
46945	1998 SB_{107}	—	September 26, 1998	Socorro	LINEAR	WIT	3.0 km	MPC · JPL
46946	1998 SR_{111}	—	September 26, 1998	Socorro	LINEAR	·	4.7 km	MPC · JPL
46947	1998 SZ_{111}	—	September 26, 1998	Socorro	LINEAR	RAF	2.1 km	MPC · JPL
46948	1998 SU_{114}	—	September 26, 1998	Socorro	LINEAR	·	3.7 km	MPC · JPL
46949	1998 SL_{117}	—	September 26, 1998	Socorro	LINEAR	·	4.2 km	MPC · JPL
46950	1998 SA_{118}	—	September 26, 1998	Socorro	LINEAR	·	8.2 km	MPC · JPL
46951	1998 SQ_{118}	—	September 26, 1998	Socorro	LINEAR	·	3.2 km	MPC · JPL
46952	1998 SQ_{119}	—	September 26, 1998	Socorro	LINEAR	·	1.9 km	MPC · JPL
46953	1998 SB_{121}	—	September 26, 1998	Socorro	LINEAR	·	6.3 km	MPC · JPL
46954	1998 SL_{121}	—	September 26, 1998	Socorro	LINEAR	slow	5.7 km	MPC · JPL
46955	1998 SS_{121}	—	September 26, 1998	Socorro	LINEAR	NEM	5.3 km	MPC · JPL
46956	1998 SQ_{123}	—	September 26, 1998	Socorro	LINEAR	·	3.0 km	MPC · JPL
46957	1998 SD_{129}	—	September 26, 1998	Socorro	LINEAR	·	3.2 km	MPC · JPL
46958	1998 SM_{129}	—	September 26, 1998	Socorro	LINEAR	·	4.6 km	MPC · JPL
46959	1998 SW_{129}	—	September 26, 1998	Socorro	LINEAR	EUN	4.8 km	MPC · JPL
46960	1998 ST_{130}	—	September 26, 1998	Socorro	LINEAR	·	3.9 km	MPC · JPL
46961	1998 SC_{132}	—	September 26, 1998	Socorro	LINEAR	·	2.1 km	MPC · JPL
46962	1998 SD_{132}	—	September 26, 1998	Socorro	LINEAR	·	2.8 km	MPC · JPL
46963	1998 SJ_{132}	—	September 26, 1998	Socorro	LINEAR	·	5.8 km	MPC · JPL
46964	1998 SE_{134}	—	September 26, 1998	Socorro	LINEAR	·	5.2 km	MPC · JPL
46965	1998 SN_{134}	—	September 26, 1998	Socorro	LINEAR	·	6.0 km	MPC · JPL
46966	1998 SP_{134}	—	September 26, 1998	Socorro	LINEAR	·	4.2 km	MPC · JPL
46967	1998 SR_{134}	—	September 26, 1998	Socorro	LINEAR	·	5.9 km	MPC · JPL
46968	1998 SJ_{135}	—	September 26, 1998	Socorro	LINEAR	·	2.9 km	MPC · JPL
46969	1998 SP_{137}	—	September 26, 1998	Socorro	LINEAR	·	5.4 km	MPC · JPL
46970	1998 SW_{137}	—	September 26, 1998	Socorro	LINEAR	·	4.4 km	MPC · JPL
46971	1998 SE_{138}	—	September 26, 1998	Socorro	LINEAR	·	6.9 km	MPC · JPL
46972	1998 SV_{138}	—	September 26, 1998	Socorro	LINEAR	·	3.9 km	MPC · JPL
46973	1998 SE_{139}	—	September 26, 1998	Socorro	LINEAR	·	4.7 km	MPC · JPL
46974	1998 SA_{140}	—	September 26, 1998	Socorro	LINEAR	EUN	2.9 km	MPC · JPL
46975	1998 SC_{140}	—	September 26, 1998	Socorro	LINEAR	EUN	3.6 km	MPC · JPL
46976	1998 SE_{140}	—	September 26, 1998	Socorro	LINEAR	·	3.5 km	MPC · JPL
46977 Krakow	1998 SE_{144}	Krakow	September 18, 1998	La Silla	E. W. Elst	·	6.0 km	MPC · JPL
46978	1998 SD_{145}	—	September 20, 1998	La Silla	E. W. Elst	·	4.5 km	MPC · JPL
46979	1998 SL_{154}	—	September 26, 1998	Socorro	LINEAR	·	4.8 km	MPC · JPL
46980	1998 SW_{156}	—	September 26, 1998	Socorro	LINEAR	·	3.4 km	MPC · JPL
46981	1998 SQ_{160}	—	September 26, 1998	Socorro	LINEAR	AGN	3.5 km	MPC · JPL
46982	1998 SP_{161}	—	September 26, 1998	Socorro	LINEAR	EUN	3.3 km	MPC · JPL
46983	1998 SX_{161}	—	September 26, 1998	Socorro	LINEAR	·	2.8 km	MPC · JPL
46984	1998 SU_{162}	—	September 26, 1998	Socorro	LINEAR	·	4.1 km	MPC · JPL
46985	1998 SA_{163}	—	September 26, 1998	Socorro	LINEAR	·	3.8 km	MPC · JPL
46986	1998 SR_{163}	—	September 18, 1998	La Silla	E. W. Elst	·	2.1 km	MPC · JPL
46987	1998 SC_{167}	—	September 25, 1998	Anderson Mesa	LONEOS	·	6.5 km	MPC · JPL
46988	1998 TJ_{5}	—	October 13, 1998	Višnjan Observatory	K. Korlević	·	3.4 km	MPC · JPL
46989	1998 TO_{5}	—	October 13, 1998	Višnjan Observatory	K. Korlević	ADE	7.9 km	MPC · JPL
46990	1998 TY_{6}	—	October 15, 1998	Reedy Creek	J. Broughton	·	6.5 km	MPC · JPL
46991 Carolinesoubiran	1998 TU_{17}	Carolinesoubiran	October 14, 1998	Caussols	ODAS	·	1.4 km	MPC · JPL
46992	1998 TZ_{17}	—	October 12, 1998	Kushiro	S. Ueda, H. Kaneda	EUN	8.5 km	MPC · JPL
46993	1998 TF_{18}	—	October 13, 1998	Xinglong	SCAP	(5)	3.6 km	MPC · JPL
46994	1998 TE_{27}	—	October 14, 1998	Kitt Peak	Spacewatch	·	4.3 km	MPC · JPL
46995	1998 TO_{28}	—	October 15, 1998	Kitt Peak	Spacewatch	·	3.0 km	MPC · JPL
46996	1998 TR_{28}	—	October 15, 1998	Kitt Peak	Spacewatch	·	5.5 km	MPC · JPL
46997	1998 TL_{29}	—	October 15, 1998	Kitt Peak	Spacewatch	EOS	5.0 km	MPC · JPL
46998	1998 TM_{30}	—	October 10, 1998	Anderson Mesa	LONEOS	·	3.4 km	MPC · JPL
46999	1998 TA_{32}	—	October 11, 1998	Anderson Mesa	LONEOS	·	5.1 km	MPC · JPL
47000	1998 TH_{32}	—	October 11, 1998	Anderson Mesa	LONEOS	·	5.8 km	MPC · JPL

back to top

== See also ==
- Meanings of minor-planet names: 46001–47000
