= Meanings of minor-planet names: 46001–47000 =

As minor planet discoveries are confirmed, they are given a permanent number by the IAU's Minor Planet Center (MPC), and the discoverers can then submit names for them, following the IAU's naming conventions. The list below concerns those minor planets in the specified number-range that have received names, and explains the meanings of those names.

Official naming citations of newly named small Solar System bodies are approved and published in a bulletin by IAU's Working Group for Small Bodies Nomenclature (WGSBN). Before May 2021, citations were published in MPC's Minor Planet Circulars for many decades. Recent citations can also be found on the JPL Small-Body Database (SBDB). Until his death in 2016, German astronomer Lutz D. Schmadel compiled these citations into the Dictionary of Minor Planet Names (DMP) and regularly updated the collection.

Based on Paul Herget's The Names of the Minor Planets, Schmadel also researched the unclear origin of numerous asteroids, most of which had been named prior to World War II. This article incorporates text from this source, which is in the public domain: SBDB New namings may only be added to this list below after official publication as the preannouncement of names is condemned. The WGSBN publishes a comprehensive guideline for the naming rules of non-cometary small Solar System bodies.

== 46001–46100 ==
| Named minor planet | Provisional | This minor planet was named for... | Ref; Catalog |
|---|---|---|---|
| 46053 Davidpatterson | 2001 DB_{77} | David Patterson, American amateur astronomer, founding member of the Huachuca Astronomy Club in Arizona. | MPC · 46053 |
| 46076 Robertschottland | 2001 EH_{4} | Robert Schottland (born 1948) is a software and database developer who has made significant contributions to projects at Lowell Observatory in Flagstaff, AZ. These projects include observational programs to study near-Earth asteroids and meteors, and Lowell's "astorb" database of minor planets. | IAU · 46076 |
| 46083 Aaronkingery | 2001 ED_{10} | Aaron Kingery (born 1987) is an astronomer at NASA's Marshall Space Flight Center. He develops meteor observation hardware and meteor analysis software for NASA's meteor programs. | IAU · 46083 |
| 46095 Frédérickoby | 2001 ER_{25} | Frédéric Édouard Koby (1890–1969), Swiss ophthalmologist and paleontologist, specialist on the cave bear. He is the son of Frédéric Louis Koby (1852–1930) | JPL · 46095 |

== 46101–46200 ==
back to top

| Named minor planet | Provisional | This minor planet was named for... | Ref; Catalog |
|---|---|---|---|
| 46110 Altheamoorhead | 2001 FK_{23} | Althea Moorhead (born 1981) is a research astronomer at NASA. She helps to bridge the gap between meteor astronomy and engineering by characterizing meteoroid populations, modeling their dynamics, and developing software that can be used to predict impacts on spacecraft. | IAU · 46110 |

== 46201–46300 ==
back to top

| Named minor planet | Provisional | This minor planet was named for... | Ref; Catalog |
|---|---|---|---|
| 46208 Gicquel | 2001 FB_{160} | Adeline Gicquel Brodtke (born 1985) is a French scientist, working as a researcher at the University of Maryland. She specializes in modeling gas and dust activity of comets. | IAU · 46208 |
| 46252 Emamajerovál | 2001 HH_{32} | Ema Majerová, Czech visual artist, graphic designer and regional historian. | IAU · 46252 |
| 46270 Margaretlandis | 2001 HW_{62} | Margaret E. Landis (b. 1990), an American scientist. | IAU · 46270 |
| 46277 Jeffhall | 2001 JH_{7} | Jeffrey C. Hall, director of Lowell Observatory | JPL · 46277 |
| 46280 Hollar | 2001 KD_{18} | Václav Hollar, 17th-century Czech painter and graphic artist | JPL · 46280 |

== 46301–46400 ==
back to top

| Named minor planet | Provisional | This minor planet was named for... | Ref; Catalog |
|---|---|---|---|
| 46308 Joelsercel | 2001 OZ_{104} | Joel C. Sercel (born 1960) is a leader in the development of technology to extract Lunar and asteroidal resources. He has had a long career in advanced engineering with JPL, the USAF, aerospace consulting, and teaching at Caltech. | IAU · 46308 |
| 46392 Bertola | 2002 AO_{6} | Francesco Bertola (born 1937), Italian author, professor of astrophysics and director of the astronomy department at Padua University. His research includes expert in galactic structure and dynamics. He is also known for the discovery of the new class of type Ib supernovae | JPL · 46392 |

== 46401–46500 ==
back to top

| Named minor planet | Provisional | This minor planet was named for... | Ref; Catalog |
|---|---|---|---|
| 46441 Mikepenston | 2002 LE_{30} | Michael Penston (1943–1990), a British observational astronomer at Royal Greenwich Observatory, who studied NGC 4151 and determined the mass of the central object. The name for this minor planet was proposed by Keith Tritton (see below). | JPL · 46441 |
| 46442 Keithtritton | 2002 LK_{35} | Keith Tritton (born 1944), a British astronomer; the discoverers recently found his lost short-period comet D/1978 C1, now known as 157P/Tritton | JPL · 46442 |

== 46501–46600 ==
back to top

| Named minor planet | Provisional | This minor planet was named for... | Ref; Catalog |
|---|---|---|---|
| 46513 Ampzing | 1972 FC | Samuel Ampzing, Dutch minister, poet and purist | JPL · 46513 |
| 46514 Lasswitz | 1977 JA | Kurd Lasswitz, German philosopher and poet | JPL · 46514 |
| 46539 Viktortikhonov | 1982 UE_{12} | Viktor Vasilyevich Tikhonov (1930–2014), an outstanding Soviet ice hockey player and coach. | JPL · 46539 |
| 46563 Oken | 1991 RY_{3} | Lorenz Oken, German professor of medicine and Romantic natural philosopher, founder of the Gesellschaft Deutscher Naturforscher und Ärzte (Society of German Naturalists and Physicians) | JPL · 46563 |
| 46568 Stevenlee | 1991 SL | Steven Lee, Australian astronomer, discoverer of comet C/1999 H1 (Lee) | JPL · 46568 |
| 46580 Ryouichiirie | 1992 GC | Ryouichi Irie (born 1949), a Japanese amateur astronomer in Toyooka city, Hyogo prefecture, and an independent discoverer of C/1988 P1 (Machholz). | JPL · 46580 |
| 46588 Murakamimasayuki | 1992 WR | Masayuki Murakami, Japanese amateur astronomer. | IAU · 46588 |
| 46589 Fukusako | 1992 WU | Kazuyoshi Fukusako, Japanese systems engineer and amateur astronomer. | IAU · 46589 |
| 46590 Akabeko | 1992 WP_{1} | Akabeko (“red cow”) is the name of a traditional folk toy from the Aizu region of Japan. | IAU · 46590 |
| 46592 Marinawatanabe | 1992 YP | Marina Watanabe (1990–2019), together with her mother Yoshie, acted as a manager/producer for her father, Junichi Watanabe on his outreach activities in astronomy and planetary sciences. | JPL · 46592 |
| 46595 Kita-Kyushu | 1992 YB_{4} | Kita-Kyushu, a city in Fukuoka prefecture, Japan | JPL · 46595 |
| 46596 Tobata | 1993 BD | Tobata, a ward of Kita-Kyushu City in Fukuoka prefecture, Japan | JPL · 46596 |

== 46601–46700 ==
back to top

| Named minor planet | Provisional | This minor planet was named for... | Ref; Catalog |
|---|---|---|---|
| 46608 Yoshinokeiji | 1993 RA_{2} | Keiji Yoshino, Japanese amateur astronomer. | IAU · 46608 |
| 46609 Fukuzumi | 1993 SQ_{1} | Takahiro Fukuzumi, Japanese researcher at the Minamiaso Luna Observatory in Kumamoto Prefecture. | IAU · 46609 |
| 46610 Bésixdouze | 1993 TQ_{1} | The number 46610 translates to the hexadecimal B612 (the French "bé-six-douze" stands for "b-six-twelve"), the designation of the fictitious minor planet on which Saint-Exupéry's Little Prince lived | JPL · 46610 |
| 46631 Hosoikatsumasa | 1994 TQ_{3} | Katsumasa Hosoi, Japanese amateur astronomer. | IAU · 46631 |
| 46632 RISE | 1994 TN_{15} | The RISE (Research of Interior Structure and Evolution of solar system bodies) project of the National Astronomical Observatory of Japan aims to elucidate the origin and evolution of the Moon, planets and their moons mainly through geodetic approaches by space missions. | JPL · 46632 |
| 46634 Minamiaizumachi | 1994 VR_{2} | Minamiaizu Town in Fukushima Prefecture, Japan. | IAU · 46634 |
| 46643 Yanase | 1995 KM | Takashi Yanase, Japanese cartoonist | JPL · 46643 |
| 46644 Lagia | 1995 OF | Livia "Lagia" Giacomini, Italian scientific journalist and astrophysicist | JPL · 46644 |
| 46649 Tsudahiroyuki | 1995 SN_{4} | Hiroyuki Tsuda, the director of the Ginganomori Observatory, a public observatory in Rikubetsu, Hokkaido, Japan. | IAU · 46649 |
| 46669 Wangyongzhi | 1996 LK | Wang Yongzhi, Chinese aerospace expert which was the first chief architect of China's crewed space flight | JPL · 46669 |
| 46686 Anitasohus | 1997 AS_{13} | From 1974 to 2006, Anita Sohus (born 1951) undertook multiple roles on Voyager and Galileo in JPL's Outreach and Education Office, communicating NASA's science results to the science community and the public | JPL · 46686 |
| 46689 Hakuryuko | 1997 AL_{19} | Hakuryuko is the name of the marsh located in the northeastern part of Akayu hot spring, Nanyo city, Yamagata. | JPL · 46689 |
| 46691 Ghezzi | 1997 BK_{3} | Pierangelo Ghezzi (born 1956), an Italian amateur astronomer and discoverer of minor planets who is also an observer of variable stars. | IAU · 46691 |
| 46692 Taormina | 1997 CW_{1} | Taormina, Sicily † | MPC · 46692 |

== 46701–46800 ==
back to top

| Named minor planet | Provisional | This minor planet was named for... | Ref; Catalog |
|---|---|---|---|
| 46701 Interrante | 1997 CP_{29} | Giorgio Interrante (born 1969) an Italian amateur astronomer and member of the astrometry team at Beppe Forti Astronomical Observatory (K83) in Montelupo Fiorentino, Tuscany. | IAU · 46701 |
| 46702 Linapucci | 1997 DX | Lina Pucci, mother of the first discoverer | JPL · 46702 |
| 46719 Plantade | 1997 PJ | François de Plantade, French cartographer and astronomer, founder of the Société royale des sciences de Montpellier (Royal Society of Sciences of Montpellier) | JPL · 46719 |
| 46720 Pierostroppa | 1997 PO_{4} | Piero Stroppa, Italian physics teacher and astronomy populariser, who worked for the magazine Nuovo Orione | JPL · 46720 |
| 46722 Ireneadler | 1997 RA_{1} | Irene Adler, heroine of the Sherlock Holmes story A Scandal in Bohemia | JPL · 46722 |
| 46727 Hidekimatsuyama | 1997 SN_{25} | Hideki Matsuyama (born 1970) became a member of the Nanyo Astronomical Lovers Club in 1990 and actively popularizes astronomy | JPL · 46727 |
| 46731 Prieurblanc | 1997 TB_{18} | Pierre Prieur-Blanc, one of the three people involved in the construction of the Observatoire de Paris' coronagraphic station on Pic de Château-Renard at Saint-Véran in the Hautes-Alpes | JPL · 46731 |
| 46737 Anpanman | 1997 VO | Anpanman, Takashi Yanase's cartoon hero, whose head is a bun filled with sweet bean jam | JPL · 46737 |
| 46748 Giusacayrel | 1998 DN_{23} | Giusa Cayrel (1920–2012), the first woman astronomer appointed at Padova University, Italy. | IAU · 46748 |
| 46793 Phinney | 1998 JP | Jeffrey L. Phinney, American astronomer | JPL · 46793 |
| 46796 Mamigasakigawa | 1998 KU | Mamigasakigawa is the river that flows through the center of Yamagata City. It is a branch of the Mogami River | JPL · 46796 |

== 46801–46900 ==
back to top

| Named minor planet | Provisional | This minor planet was named for... | Ref; Catalog |
|---|---|---|---|
| 46824 Tambora | 1998 MT_{38} | Mount Tambora on the island of Sumbawa (Indonesia) is an active volcano that exploded in April 1815. It was the most powerful eruption in recorded history, and resulted in a brief period of significant worldwide climate change, including the "Year without a Summer" (1816). | JPL · 46824 |
| 46829 McMahon | 1998 OS_{14} | Jay W. McMahon (born 1982) has carried out fundamental research on the dynamics and evolutionary behavior of binary asteroids. His work has laid the foundation for a rigorous understanding of the Binary YORP effect and the determination of material parameters of binary asteroids based on remote observations. | JPL · 46829 |

== 46901–47000 ==
back to top

| Named minor planet | Provisional | This minor planet was named for... | Ref; Catalog |
|---|---|---|---|
| 46917 Rogercayrel | 1998 SA | Roger Cayrel (1925–2021), a French astronomer. | IAU · 46917 |
| 46920 Suzanedwards | 1998 SX_{12} | Suzan Edwards (born 1951) is the L. Clark Seelye Professor of Astronomy at Smith College. Edwards studies and has made significant contributions to the understanding of the formation of stars, the evolution of planet-forming disks, and the role played by disk- and stellar-driven winds during the early phases of stellar evolution. | JPL · 46920 |
| 46925 Bradyharan | 1998 SS_{27} | Brady John Haran (b. 1976) is an Australian-British video journalist and filmmaker. On his YouTube channels, which include Periodic Videos and Numberphile, he frequently collaborates with academics and other educational YouTubers. | IAU · 46925 |
| 46977 Krakow | 1998 SE_{144} | Kraków, Poland | JPL · 46977 |
| 46991 Carolinesoubiran | 1998 TU_{17} | Caroline Soubiran (b. 1962), a French astronomer. | IAU · 46991 |

back to top

| Preceded by 45,001–46,000 | Meanings of minor-planet names List of minor planets: 46,001–47,000 | Succeeded by 47,001–48,000 |
