= Hiroshi Araki =

Japanese astronomer

Minor planets discovered: 3
26887 Tokyogiants	14 October 1994	list · ^{[A]}
46632 RISE	14 October 1994	list · ^{[A]}
100267 JAXA	14 October 1994	list · ^{[A]}^{[B]}
co-discovered with: ^{A} I. Satō, ^{B} M. Abe

Hiroshi Araki (荒木 博志, Araki Hiroshi) is a Japanese astronomer. He works at National Astronomical Observatory of Japan's Mizusawa VLBI observatory in Ōshū, and was the Science Team sub-Leader of the MUSES-C mission. He has discovered three asteroids. With colleagues at the observatory, he has created a detailed topographic map of the Moon.
