= Atsushi Sugie =

Japanese astronomer

Minor planets discovered: 122
see § List of discovered minor planets

Atsushi Sugie (杉江 淳, Sugie Atsushi) is a Japanese astronomer and a discoverer of minor planets. He works at the Dynic Astronomical Observatory and has discovered many planets while working there. The Minor Planet Center credits him with the discovery of 122 numbered minor planets during 1988–2000.

The main-belt asteroid 3957 Sugie, discovered by Karl Reinmuth in 1933, was named in his honor. Naming citation was published on 1 September 1993 (M.P.C. 22500).

== List of discovered minor planets ==
3997 Taga	6 December 1988
4289 Biwako	29 October 1989
4352 Kyoto	29 October 1989
4461 Sayama	5 March 1990
4873 Fukaya	4 March 1990
4952 Kibeshigemaro	26 March 1990
5008 Miyazawakenji	20 February 1991
5330 Senrikyu	21 January 1990
5332 Davidaguilar	16 February 1990
5435 Kameoka	21 January 1990
5440 Terao	16 April 1991
5448 Siebold	26 September 1992
5618 Saitama	4 March 1990
5623 Iwamori	20 October 1990
5825 Rakuyou	21 January 1990
6024 Ochanomizu	27 October 1992
6100 Kunitomoikkansai	9 November 1991
6139 Naomi	10 January 1992
6199 Yoshiokayayoi	26 January 1992
6306 Nishimura	30 October 1989
6321 Namuratakao	19 January 1991
6326 Idamiyoshi	18 March 1991
6329 Hikonejyo	12 March 1992
6655 Nagahama	8 March 1992
6657 Otukyo	17 November 1992

6794 Masuisakura	26 February 1992
7019 Tagayuichan	8 March 1992
7021 Tomiokamachi	6 May 1992
7023 Heiankyo	25 May 1992
(7053) 1989 FA	28 March 1989
(7084) 1991 BR	19 January 1991
(7249) 1992 SN	26 September 1992
(7288) 1991 FE1	18 March 1991
(7297) 1992 UG	21 October 1992
(7426) 1992 US4	27 October 1992
(7589) 1992 SR1	26 September 1992
(8094) 1992 UG3	24 October 1992
(8186) 1992 WP3	17 November 1992
(8360) 1990 FD1	26 March 1990
(8366) 1990 UL1	20 October 1990
(9037) 1990 UJ2	20 October 1990
(9061) 1992 WC3	18 November 1992
(9353) 1991 VM4	9 November 1991
(9366) 1992 WR1	17 November 1992
(9970) 1992 ST1	26 September 1992
10142 Sakka	15 November 1993
10143 Kamogawa	8 January 1994
(10337) 1991 RO1	10 September 1991
(10527) 1990 UN1	20 October 1990
(10535) 1991 RB1	10 September 1991

(10765) 1990 UZ	20 October 1990
(10766) 1990 UB1	20 October 1990
(10840) 1994 LR	1 June 1994
(10909) 1997 XB10	5 December 1997
(11290) 1991 RA1	10 September 1991
(11888) 1990 UD3	19 October 1990
(11923) 1992 WX	17 November 1992
(12264) 1990 CD	1 February 1990
(12283) 1991 EC	9 March 1991
(12308) 1991 VB5	4 November 1991
(12328) 1992 SK13	26 September 1992
(12334) 1992 WD3	18 November 1992
12349 Akebonozou	14 April 1993
(12717) 1991 HK	16 April 1991
(12728) 1991 RP1	10 September 1991
(12744) 1992 SQ	26 September 1992
(13295) 1998 RE	2 September 1998
(13508) 1989 DC	27 February 1989
(13512) 1989 TH1	8 October 1989
(13516) 1990 UO1	20 October 1990
(13519) 1990 VM3	15 November 1990
(14381) 1990 CE	1 February 1990
(14444) 1992 TG1	2 October 1992
(14889) 1991 VX2	5 November 1991
(14970) 1997 QA2	25 August 1997

(14996) 1997 VY2	5 November 1997
(15272) 1991 GH	3 April 1991
(15305) 1992 WT1	18 November 1992
(15719) 1990 CF	1 February 1990
(15730) 1990 UA1	20 October 1990
(15750) 1991 VJ4	9 November 1991
(15765) 1992 WU1	18 November 1992
(16508) 1990 UB3	19 October 1990
(16523) 1991 BP	19 January 1991
(16559) 1991 VA3	9 November 1991
(17469) 1991 BT	19 January 1991
(17515) 1992 UT1	21 October 1992
(17559) 1994 AR1	8 January 1994
(18429) 1994 AO1	8 January 1994
(20085) 1994 LC	1 June 1994
(21037) 1990 EB	4 March 1990
(21116) 1992 SO	26 September 1992
(22331) 1992 AC1	10 January 1992
(22350) 1992 US	21 October 1992
(23497) 1991 VG4	5 November 1991
(23845) 1998 RB	2 September 1998
(24758) 1992 WZ	17 November 1992
(26120) 1991 VZ2	5 November 1991
(26208) 1997 QJ3	28 August 1997
(26215) 1997 VM2	4 November 1997

(26367) 1999 CD1	2 February 1999
(27771) 1991 VY2	5 November 1991
(27972) 1997 TA18	8 October 1997
(29229) 1992 EE1	10 March 1992
(29309) 1993 VF1	15 November 1993
(31126) 1997 SG2	19 September 1997
(33028) 1997 QN	24 August 1997
(41042) 1999 VB2	3 November 1999
(46572) 1991 VA5	4 November 1991
(46573) 1992 AJ1	10 January 1992
(46591) 1992 WS1	18 November 1992
(46716) 1997 NX	3 July 1997
(52631) 1997 WC21	20 November 1997
(58663) 1997 XZ10	9 December 1997
(80664) 2000 BZ10	26 January 2000
(86296) 1999 VA21	9 November 1999
(129577) 1997 RA8	9 September 1997
(148009) 1997 NW	3 July 1997
(152575) 1994 GY	14 April 1994
(164914) 1999 XV37	7 December 1999
(283329) 1997 RG8	11 September 1997
(399318) 1997 XJ_{1}	4 December 1997
