= Saheki =

Saheki may refer to:

- Saheki (crater), impact crater on Mars
- 4606 Saheki, minor planet
