= 6349 Acapulco =

Asteroid

Discovery
- Discovered by: M. Koishikawa
- Discovery site: Ayashi Station (391) (Sendai Astronomical Observatory)
- Discovery date: 8 February 1995

Designations
- Named after: Acapulco (Mexican sister city)
- Alternative designations: 1995 CN_{1} · 1947 EC; 1973 AH_{4} · 1973 CL; 1988 SA_{1}
- Minor planet category: main-belt · (middle); Adeona

Orbital characteristics
- Epoch 4 September 2017 (JD 2458000.5)
- Uncertainty parameter 0
- Observation arc: 70.23 yr (25,651 days)
- Aphelion: 3.0392 AU
- Perihelion: 2.2937 AU
- Semi-major axis: 2.6664 AU
- Eccentricity: 0.1398
- Orbital period (sidereal): 4.35 yr (1,590 days)
- Mean anomaly: 23.621°
- Mean motion: 0° 13^{m} 35.04^{s} / day
- Inclination: 10.787°
- Longitude of ascending node: 328.10°
- Argument of perihelion: 236.48°

Physical characteristics
- Dimensions: 12.35 km (calculated); 14.66±3.43 km 19.24±1.2 km (IRAS:5); 20.429±0.206 km 22.54±0.69 km 22.69±0.56 km 23.02±8.65 km
- Synodic rotation period: 4.3755±0.0020 h
- Geometric albedo: 0.0377±0.0066; 0.04±0.03; 0.045±0.005; 0.057±0.004; 0.0757±0.010 (IRAS:5); 0.10 (assumed); 0.10±0.08
- Spectral type: S
- Absolute magnitude (H): 12.00 · 12.18±0.54 · 12.2 · 12.209±0.001 (R) · 12.3 · 12.53 · 12.66

6349 Acapulco, provisional designation 1995 CN_{1}, is a dark Adeonian asteroid from the middle region of the asteroid belt, approximately 22 kilometers in diameter.

The asteroid was discovered on 8 February 1995, by Japanese astronomer Masahiro Koishikawa at the Ayashi Station (391) of the Sendai Astronomical Observatory in the Tōhoku region of Japan. It was named for the Mexican city of Acapulco.

== Orbit and classification ==
Acapulco is a member of the Adeona family (505), a large family of carbonaceous asteroids. It orbits the Sun in the central main-belt at a distance of 2.3–3.0 AU once every 4 years and 4 months (1,590 days). Its orbit has an eccentricity of 0.14 and an inclination of 11° with respect to the ecliptic.

In March 1947, it was first identified as 1947 EC at Yerkes Observatory. The body's observation arc begins 42 years prior to its official discovery observation at Ayashi, with a precovery taken at Palomar Observatory in 1953.

== Physical characteristics ==
=== Lightcurves ===
A rotational lightcurve of Acapulco was obtained from photometric observations made at the Palomar Transient Factory in September 2010. Lightcurve analysis gave a rotation period of 4.3755 hours with a brightness variation of 0.18 magnitude (U=2).

=== Diameter and albedo ===
According to the surveys carried out by the Infrared Astronomical Satellite IRAS, the Japanese Akari satellite, and NASA's Wide-field Infrared Survey Explorer with its subsequent NEOWISE mission, Acapulco measures between 14.66 and 23.02 kilometers in diameter, and its surface has an albedo in the range of 0.037 to 0.10.

The Collaborative Asteroid Lightcurve Link assumes an albedo of 0.10 and calculates a smaller diameter of 12.35 kilometers with an absolute magnitude of 12.66.

== Naming ==
This minor planet was named for the Mexican city of Acapulco, known for its major seaport, which is considered to be among the most beautiful ones in the world.

Since 1973, Acapulco is the sister city of the Japanese city of Sendai, where the discovering observatory is located, and after which the minor planet 3133 Sendai is named. Hasekura Tsunenaga (1571–1622) – retainer of Date Masamune, who founded the city of Sendai – stopped by at Acapulco on his diplomatic mission to Rome. The official naming citation was published by the Minor Planet Center on 2 February 1999 (M.P.C. 33787).
