= 2571 =

2571 may refer to:

- 2571 Geisei, an inner Solar System asteroid
- 2571, the National Center for Biotechnology Information code for the human gene for glutamate decarboxylase 1
- 2571, a plot device in Ghost in the Shell (2017 film)
- HiTEC 2571, a rust inhibitor from Afton Chemical
- 2571, the year in the 26th century

== See also ==
- 2571 BC
