= 3851 Alhambra =

Main-belt asteroid

Discovery
- Discovered by: T. Seki
- Discovery site: Geisei Obs.
- Discovery date: 30 October 1986

Designations
- Named after: Alhambra (World Heritage Site)
- Alternative designations: 1986 UZ · 1950 MC; 1960 RA · 1965 CD; 1973 SE_{4} · 1973 ST_{2}
- Minor planet category: main-belt · Flora

Orbital characteristics
- Epoch 4 September 2017 (JD 2458000.5)
- Uncertainty parameter 0
- Observation arc: 66.95 yr (24,452 days)
- Aphelion: 2.3148 AU
- Perihelion: 2.0338 AU
- Semi-major axis: 2.1743 AU
- Eccentricity: 0.0646
- Orbital period (sidereal): 3.21 yr (1,171 days)
- Mean anomaly: 188.88°
- Mean motion: 0° 18^{m} 26.64^{s} / day
- Inclination: 4.6276°
- Longitude of ascending node: 344.66°
- Argument of perihelion: 97.438°

Physical characteristics
- Dimensions: 6.504±0.390; 6.51 km (calculated); 6.813±0.036 km
- Synodic rotation period: 53 h
- Geometric albedo: 0.218±0.052; 0.24 (assumed); 0.2419±0.0418
- Spectral type: S
- Absolute magnitude (H): 13.0 · 13.1 · 13.78±0.00

3851 Alhambra, provisional designation 1986 UZ, is a stony Flora asteroid and relatively slow rotator from the inner regions of the asteroid belt, approximately 7 kilometers in diameter. It was discovered on 30 October 1986, by Japanese astronomer Tsutomu Seki at Geisei Observatory in Kōchi, Japan. The asteroid was named for the World Heritage Site Alhambra, in Granada, Spain.

== Orbit and classification ==
The S-type asteroid is a member of the Flora family, one of the largest groups of stony asteroids in the main-belt. It orbits the Sun in the inner main-belt at a distance of 2.0–2.3 AU once every 3 years and 3 months (1,171 days). Its orbit has an eccentricity of 0.06 and an inclination of 5° with respect to the ecliptic. The first precovery was taken at La Plata Astronomical Observatory in 1950, extending the asteroid's observation arc by 36 years prior to its discovery.

== Physical characteristics ==
A rotational lightcurve of Alhambra was obtained from photometric observations made at the Australian Hunters Hill Observatory (E14) in March 2007. It rendered a long rotation period of 53 hours with a brightness amplitude of 0.35 in magnitude (U=2). While not being a slow rotator, Alhambra's period is much longer than that of most asteroids.

According to the survey carried out by the NEOWISE mission of NASA's space-based Wide-field Infrared Survey Explorer, Alhambra measures 6.5 and 6.8 kilometers in diameter and its surface has an albedo of 0.218 and 0.242, respectively, while the Collaborative Asteroid Lightcurve Link assumes an albedo of 0.24 – derived from 8 Flora, the largest member and namesake of this orbital family – and calculates a diameter of 6.5 kilometers with an absolute magnitude of 13.1.

== Naming ==
This minor planet was named for the Alhambra ("the red one"), the famous medieval palace and fortress complex of the Moorish emirs, located in Granada, Andalusia, Spain. The place with its Islamic architecture is now a UNESCO World Heritage Site and one of Spain's major tourist attractions. The virtuoso classical guitarist Andrés Segovia, after whom the minor planet 3822 Segovia is named, had the piece Recuerdos de la Alhambra (Memories of the Alhambra) in his repertoire. The official naming citation was published by the Minor Planet Center on 21 April 1989 (M.P.C. 14482).
