= Masahiro Koishikawa =

Japanese astronomer (1952–2020)

- Born: 1952
- Died: August 26, 2020 (aged 67–68)

Minor planets discovered: 19
see § List of discovered minor planets

Masahiro Koishikawa (小石川 正弘, Koishikawa Masahiro; 1952 – 26 August 2020) was a Japanese astronomer. He studied both major and minor planets, and discovered multiple asteroids.

Koishikawa was a staff member of the Sendai Astronomical Observatory frin 1972. His research was based out of the Sendai's Ayashi (391) station. The main-belt asteroid 6097 Koishikawa, discovered by Kin Endate and Kazuro Watanabe at Kitami in 1991, was named in his honor. He died on 26 August 2020 from lung cancer.

== List of discovered minor planets ==
3994 Ayashi	2 December 1988	list
4292 Aoba	4 November 1989	list
4407 Taihaku	13 October 1988	list
4539 Miyagino	8 November 1988	list
4871 Riverside	24 November 1989	list
5128 Wakabayashi	30 March 1989	list
5751 Zao	5 January 1992	list
6089 Izumi	5 January 1989	list
6190 Rennes	8 October 1989	list
6349 Acapulco	8 February 1995	list

6859 Datemasamune	13 February 1991	list
7485 Changchun	4 December 1994	list
7816 Hanoi	18 December 1987	list
8084 Dallas	6 February 1989	list
10500 Nishi-koen	3 April 1987	list
11514 Tsunenaga	13 February 1991	list
12252 Gwangju	8 November 1988	list
14032 Mego	4 December 1994	list
30963 Mount Banzan	29 November 1994	list

== See also ==
- List of minor planet discoverers § M. Koishikawa
