= 3996 Fugaku =

Main-belt asteroid

Discovery
- Discovered by: M. Arai; H. Mori
- Discovery site: Yorii Obs.
- Discovery date: 5 December 1988

Designations
- Named after: Mount Fuji (Japan)
- Alternative designations: 1988 XG_{1} · 1939 FZ; 1957 TB · 1981 SO_{5} 1981 UM_{16}
- Minor planet category: main-belt · Flora

Orbital characteristics
- Epoch 4 September 2017 (JD 2458000.5)
- Uncertainty parameter 0
- Observation arc: 78.22 yr (28,570 days)
- Aphelion: 2.4941 AU
- Perihelion: 2.0254 AU
- Semi-major axis: 2.2597 AU
- Eccentricity: 0.1037
- Orbital period (sidereal): 3.40 yr (1,241 days)
- Mean anomaly: 338.50°
- Mean motion: 0° 17^{m} 24.36^{s} / day
- Inclination: 2.2842°
- Longitude of ascending node: 90.755°
- Argument of perihelion: 156.18°

Physical characteristics
- Dimensions: 5.151±0.074 km 5.231±0.032 km 5.40 km (calculated); 5.88±1.10 km
- Synodic rotation period: 7.1912±0.0016 h
- Geometric albedo: 0.24 (assumed); 0.34±0.17; 0.4086±0.0152; 0.420±0.066
- Spectral type: S
- Absolute magnitude (H): 13.0 · 13.055±0.003 (R) · 13.5 · 13.57±0.25

3996 Fugaku, provisional designation 1988 XG_{1}, is a stony Florian asteroid from the inner regions of the asteroid belt, approximately 5.5 kilometers in diameter. It was discovered on 5 December 1988, by Japanese amateur astronomers Masaru Arai and Hiroshi Mori at Yorii Observatory in central Japan. It was named for Mount Fuji, Japan.

== Orbit and classification ==
Fugaku is a member of the Flora family, one of the largest groups of stony asteroids in the main-belt. It orbits the Sun in the inner main-belt at a distance of 2.0–2.5 AU once every 3 years and 5 months (1,241 days). Its orbit has an eccentricity of 0.10 and an inclination of 2° with respect to the ecliptic. It was first identified as 1939 FZ at Turku Observatory in 1939, extending the asteroid's observation arc by 49 years prior to its official discovery observation.

== Physical characteristics ==
Fugaku has been characterized as a stony S-type asteroid, the most common type in the inner main-belt.

=== Rotation period ===
In March 210, a rotational lightcurve of Fugaku was obtained from photometric observations at the Palomar Transient Factory in California. It gave a rotation period of 7.1912 hours with a change in brightness of 0.86 magnitude (U=2).

=== Diameter and albedo ===
According to the survey carried out by NASA's Wide-field Infrared Survey Explorer with its subsequent NEOWISE mission, Fugaku measures between 5.15 and 5.88 kilometers in diameter, and its surface has an albedo between 0.34 and 0.42. The Collaborative Asteroid Lightcurve Link assumes an albedo of 0.24 – derived from 8 Flora, the largest member and namesake of this family – and calculates a diameter of 5.40 kilometers with an absolute magnitude of 13.5.

== Naming ==
This minor planet was named for the ancient name of Mount Fuji, Japan's highest mountain and a well-known symbol. Another minor planet, 1584 Fuji, is also named for this mountain. The official naming citation was published by the Minor Planet Center on 4 May 1999 (M.P.C. 34619).
