= 5751 Zao =

Near-Earth asteroid

Discovery
- Discovered by: M. Koishikawa
- Discovery site: Ayashi Station
- Discovery date: 5 January 1992

Designations
- Named after: Mount Zaō
- Alternative designations: MPO 319156, 1989 EN1
- Minor planet category: Amor NEO

Orbital characteristics
- Epoch 13 January 2016 (JD 2457400.5)
- Uncertainty parameter 0
- Observation arc: 9792 days (26.81 yr)
- Aphelion: 2.994076221 AU (447.9074274 Gm)
- Perihelion: 1.21174819 AU (181.274949 Gm)
- Semi-major axis: 2.102912204 AU (314.5911880 Gm)
- Eccentricity: 0.423776140
- Orbital period (sidereal): 3.05 yr (1113.9 d)
- Mean anomaly: 300.120144°
- Mean motion: 0° 19^{m} 23.523^{s} / day
- Inclination: 16.0739405°
- Longitude of ascending node: 121.691193°
- Argument of perihelion: 25.2587992°
- Earth MOID: 0.244159 AU (36.5257 Gm)

Physical characteristics
- Mean diameter: 2.3 km
- Synodic rotation period: 76 h (3.2 d)
- Geometric albedo: 0.36
- Absolute magnitude (H): 14.8

5751 Zao, provisional designation 1992 AC, is an Amor asteroid discovered by Japanese astronomer M. Koishikawa at the Ayashi Station of the Sendai Astronomical Observatory on 5 January 1992

== Physical properties ==
Zao has been observed by several groups to determine its rotational period. Its light curve was observed by Pravec, et al. between 1992 and 1995 with the intention of determining its rotational period. From its nearly constant brightness it was determined that the asteroid is roughly spherical and has a rotational period of ≥ 21.7 hr. Another group led by Wisniewski conducted an approximately 5 hour observation and were unable to conclude a rotational period. Zao was again observed in 2001 by Delbó, et al. using the Keck telescope. They were able to determine the asteroid's albedo of 0.36 and re-classify the asteroid from X-type to E-type. Using the asteroid's albedo and the Near Earth Asteroid Thermal Model (NEATM) the asteroid's diameter was estimated to be 2.3 km. Further study of the asteroid by the Ondrejov Asteroid Photometry Project concludes that a rotational period of 76 hours is consistent with earlier measurements.
