= Tsutomu Seki =

Japanese astronomer

Minor planets discovered: 225
see § List of discovered minor planets

Tsutomu Seki (関 勉, Seki Tsutomu; born November 3, 1930) is a Japanese amateur astronomer and discoverer of minor planets and comets, born in Kōchi, Japan.

== Career ==
Tsutomu Seki is the Director of the Geisei Observatory in Kōchi, and in charge of the Comet Section of the Oriental Astronomical Association. Between 1961 and 1970, he had visually discovered six comets, including C/1965 S1 (Ikeya-Seki), the well known great comet of 1965.

He has also discovered a large number of asteroids such as 13553 Masaakikoyama and 5209 Oloosson, a near-Earth Amor asteroid and a Jupiter trojan, respectively. Many of his discoveries are named after famous sites in Kōchi, such as Harimaya-bashi, Ryōma (after Sakamoto Ryōma), Katsurahama beach, and Kagami-gawa.

== Awards and honors ==
Asteroid 3426 Seki, discovered by Karl Reinmuth at the Heidelberg Observatory in 1932, was named in his honor. The official naming citation was published by the Minor Planet Center on 16 December 1986 (M.P.C. 11443).

== List of discovered minor planets ==
2396 Kochi	9 February 1981	list
2571 Geisei	23 October 1981	list
2582 Harimaya-Bashi	26 September 1981	list
2621 Goto	9 February 1981	list
2835 Ryoma	20 November 1982	list
2880 Nihondaira	8 February 1983	list
2961 Katsurahama	7 December 1982	list
3150 Tosa	11 February 1983	list
3182 Shimanto	27 November 1984	list
3262 Miune	28 November 1983	list
3431 Nakano	24 August 1984	list
3785 Kitami	30 November 1986	list
3822 Segovia	21 February 1988	list
3851 Alhambra	30 October 1986	list
3914 Kotogahama	16 September 1987	list
3935 Toatenmongakkai	14 August 1987	list
4039 Souseki	17 September 1987	list
4095 Ishizuchisan	16 September 1987	list
4097 Tsurugisan	18 November 1987	list
4101 Ruikou	8 February 1988	list
4223 Shikoku	7 May 1988	list
4256 Kagamigawa	3 October 1986	list
4290 Heisei	30 October 1989	list
4399 Ashizuri	21 October 1984	list
4411 Kochibunkyo	3 January 1990	list

4439 Muroto	2 November 1984	list
4441 Toshie	26 January 1985	list
4496 Kamimachi	9 December 1988	list
4498 Shinkoyama	5 January 1989	list
4505 Okamura	20 February 1990	list
4578 Kurashiki	7 December 1988	list
4606 Saheki	27 October 1987	list
4639 Minox	5 March 1989	list
4670 Yoshinogawa	19 December 1987	list
4675 Ohboke	19 September 1990	list
4841 Manjiro	28 October 1989	list
4865 Sor	18 October 1988	list
5058 Tarrega	28 July 1987	list
5113 Kohno	19 January 1988	list
5124 Muraoka	4 February 1989	list
5141 Tachibana	16 December 1990	list
5179 Takeshima	1 March 1989	list
5209 Oloosson	13 February 1989	list
5815 Shinsengumi	3 January 1989	list
5823 Oryo	20 December 1989	list
5824 Inagaki	24 December 1989	list
5862 Sakanoue	13 January 1983	list
5915 Yoshihiro	9 March 1991	list
5962 Shikokutenkyo	18 April 1990	list
5966 Tomeko	15 November 1990	list

5969 Ryuichiro	17 March 1991	list
6088 Hoshigakubo	18 October 1988	list
6237 Chikushi	4 February 1989	list
6244 Okamoto	20 August 1990	list
6302 Tengukogen	2 February 1989	list
6399 Harada	3 April 1991	list
6449 Kudara	7 February 1991	list
6458 Nouda	2 October 1992	list
6497 Yamasaki	27 October 1992	list
6514 Torahiko	25 November 1987	list
6606 Makino	16 October 1990	list
6660 Matsumoto	16 January 1993	list
6699 Igaueno	19 December 1987	list
6720 Gifu	11 November 1990	list
6925 Susumu	24 October 1993	list
6965 Niyodogawa	11 November 1990	list
6971 Omogokei	8 February 1992	list
7017 Uradowan	1 February 1992	list
7094 Godaisan	4 September 1992	list
7125 Eitarodate	7 February 1991	list
7235 Hitsuzan	30 October 1986	list
7274 Washioyama	21 March 1982	list
7287 Yokokurayama	10 November 1990	list
7289 Kamegamori	5 May 1991	list
7410 Kawazoe	20 August 1990	list

7415 Susumuimoto	14 November 1990	list
7463 Oukawamine	20 September 1985	list
7594 Shotaro	19 January 1993	list
7650 Kaname	16 October 1990	list
7693 Hoshitakuhai	20 November 1982	list
8083 Mayeda	1 November 1988	list
8163 Ishizaki	27 October 1990	list
8234 Nobeoka	3 November 1997	list
8367 Bokusui	23 October 1990	list
8375 Kenzokohno	12 January 1992	list
8387 Fujimori	19 February 1993	list
8428 Okiko	3 November 1997	list
8485 Satoru	29 March 1989	list
8492 Kikuoka	21 January 1990	list
8732 Champion	8 December 1996	list
8877 Rentaro	19 January 1993	list
8957 Koujounotsuki	22 March 1998	list
9032 Tanakami	23 November 1989	list
9062 Ohnishi	27 November 1992	list
9063 Washi	17 December 1992	list
9196 Sukagawa	27 November 1992	list
9198 Sasagamine	25 January 1993	list
9323 Hirohisasato	11 February 1989	list
9409 Kanpuzan	25 January 1995	list
9745 Shinkenwada	2 November 1988	list

9751 Kadota	20 August 1990	list
9756 Ezaki	12 February 1991	list
9852 Gora	24 December 1990	list
9870 Maehata	24 February 1992	list
9964 Hideyonoguchi	13 February 1992	list
10078 Stanthorpe	30 October 1989	list
10091 Bandaisan	11 November 1990	list
10094 Eijikato	20 February 1991	list
10167 Yoshiwatiso	31 January 1995	list
10300 Tanakadate	6 March 1989	list
10321 Rampo	26 October 1990	list
10547 Yosakoi	2 May 1992	list
10791 Uson	8 February 1992	list
10803 Caléyo	21 October 1992	list
10829 Matsuobasho	22 October 1993	list
11288 Okunohosomichi	10 December 1990	list
11294 Kazu	4 February 1992	list
11296 Denzen	24 May 1992	list
11304 Cowra	19 February 1993	list
11321 Tosimatumoto	21 February 1995	list
11361 Orbinskij	28 February 1998	list
11516 Arthurpage	6 March 1991	list
11878 Hanamiyama	18 April 1990	list
11925 Usubae	23 December 1992	list
11927 Mount Kent	16 January 1993	list

12084 Unno	22 March 1998	list
12277 Tajimasatonokai	17 November 1990	list
12335 Tatsukushi	21 November 1992	list
12690 Kochimiraikagaku	5 November 1988	list
12706 Tanezaki	15 October 1990	list
12749 Odokaigan	2 February 1993	list
13015 Noradokei	14 December 1987	list
13529 Yokaboshi	1 September 1991	list
13553 Masaakikoyama	2 May 1992	list
13569 Oshu	4 March 1993	list
13918 Tsukinada	24 August 1984	list
13933 Charleville	2 November 1988	list
13978 Hiwasa	4 May 1992	list
13989 Murikabushi	16 January 1993	list
14012 Amedee	6 December 1993	list
14880 Moa	7 February 1991	list
15238 Hisaohori	2 February 1989	list
15252 Yoshiken	20 July 1990	list
15723 Girraween	20 September 1990	list
15739 Matsukuma	9 March 1991	list
16503 Ayato	15 October 1990	list
16602 Anabuki	17 March 1993	list
17461 Shigosenger	20 October 1990	list
17465 Inawashiroko	11 November 1990	list
17508 Takumadan	3 May 1992	list

17509 Ikumadan	4 May 1992	list
18365 Shimomoto	17 November 1990	list
18400 Muramatsushigeru	25 November 1992	list
18609 Shinobuyama	30 January 1998	list
18644 Arashiyama	2 March 1998	list
19156 Heco	20 September 1990	list
19161 Sakawa	15 October 1990	list
19197 Akasaki	6 March 1992	list
19210 Higayoshihiro	25 December 1992	list
20040 Tatsuyamatsuyama	21 November 1992	list
20102 Takasago	31 January 1995	list
21014 Daishi	13 October 1988	list
21016 Miyazawaseiroku	2 November 1988	list
21022 Ike	2 February 1989	list
21089 Mochizuki	8 February 1992	list
21126 Katsuyoshi	19 January 1993	list
21166 Nobuyukishouji	6 December 1993	list
21282 Shimizuyuka	14 October 1996	list
23468 Kannabe	20 September 1990	list
23478 Chikumagawa	21 January 1991	list
23504 Haneda	7 March 1992	list
23587 Abukumado	2 October 1995	list
24889 Tamurahosinomura	11 December 1996	list
26092 Norikonoriyuki	16 September 1987	list
26097 Kamishi	6 November 1988	list

26123 Hiroshiyoshida	29 July 1992	list
26127 Otakasakajyo	19 January 1993	list
26151 Irinokaigan	2 October 1994	list
26837 Yoshitakaokazaki	7 September 1991	list
27716 Nobuyuki	13 February 1989	list
27739 Kimihiro	17 October 1990	list
27740 Obatomoyuki	20 October 1990	list
27790 Urashimataro	13 February 1993	list
29157 Higashinihon	11 March 1989	list
29186 Lake Tekapo	26 October 1990	list
29199 Himeji	17 March 1991	list
29249 Hiraizumi	26 September 1992	list
29252 Konjikido	25 January 1993	list
29337 Hakurojo	6 January 1995	list
30838 Hitomiyamasaki	7 February 1991	list
30879 Hiroshikanai	25 May 1992	list
30888 Okitsumisaki	19 January 1993	list
32858 Kitakamigawa	25 January 1993	list
35076 Yataro	21 January 1990	list
35093 Akicity	14 March 1991	list
37729 Akiratakao	14 October 1996	list
39558 Kishine	24 May 1992	list
39566 Carllewis	26 September 1992	list
39712 Ehimedaigaku	14 October 1996	list
39809 Fukuchan	30 November 1997	list

42566 Ryutaro	3 December 1996	list
(43792) 1990 VY_{1}	11 November 1990	list
43794 Yabetakemoto	19 December 1990	list
(43803) 1991 RH_{2}	7 September 1991	list
43857 Tanijinzan	15 November 1993	list
46580 Ryouichiirie	2 April 1992	list
46592 Marinawatanabe	16 December 1992	list
46595 Kita-Kyushu	29 December 1992	list
46596 Tobata	16 January 1993	list
48482 Oruki	5 February 1992	list
48495 Ryugado	16 January 1993	list
52285 Kakurinji	30 July 1990	list
52455 Masamika	6 January 1995	list
58164 Reiwanohoshi	20 November 1989	list
58184 Masayukiyamamoto	7 September 1991	list
58185 Rokkosan	7 September 1991	list
65716 Ohkinohama	25 January 1993	list
65894 Echizenmisaki	30 January 1998	list
79130 Bandanomori	26 October 1990	list
79149 Kajigamori	27 October 1992	list
79152 Abukumagawa	17 March 1993	list
90713 Chajnantor	11 November 1990	list
120462 Amanohashidate	26 October 1990	list
237276 Nakama	2 December 2008	list
(321821) 2010 RT_{46}	3 September 2010	list

== See also ==
- List of minor planet discoverers § T. Seki
