= East-Asian Planet Search Network =

East-Asian Planet Search Network (EAPSNET) is an international collaboration between China, Japan, and Korea. Each facility, BOAO (Korea), Xinglong (China), and OAO (Japan), has a 2m class telescope, a high dispersion echelle spectrograph, and an iodine absorption cell for precise RV measurements, looking for extrasolar planets.

== Discovery ==
NOTE: HD 119445 b is a brown dwarf candidate.

Star	Constellation	Right ascension	Declination	App. mag.	Distance (ly)	Spectral type	Brown dwarf	Mass (M_{J})	Radius (R_{J})	Orbital period (d)	Semimajor axis (AU)	Orbital eccentricity	Inclination (°)	Discovery year
HD 119445	Canes Venatici	13^{h} 42^{m} 28.8063^{s}	+41° 40′ 27.415″	?	942.6	G6III	HD 119445b	37.6±2.6	?	410.2±0.6	1.71±0.06	0.082±0.007	?	2009
