= 7816 Hanoi =

Asteroid

Discovery
- Discovered by: M. Koishikawa
- Discovery site: Ayashi Station (391); Sendai Obs.
- Discovery date: 18 December 1987

Designations
- Named after: Hanoi (Vietnamese capital)
- Alternative designations: 1987 YA · 1994 VB_{1}
- Minor planet category: Mars-crosser

Orbital characteristics
- Epoch 4 September 2017 (JD 2458000.5)
- Uncertainty parameter 0
- Observation arc: 29.37 yr (10,728 days)
- Aphelion: 2.9970 AU
- Perihelion: 1.6341 AU
- Semi-major axis: 2.3156 AU
- Eccentricity: 0.2943
- Orbital period (sidereal): 3.52 yr (1,287 days)
- Mean anomaly: 184.18°
- Mean motion: 0° 16^{m} 46.92^{s} / day
- Inclination: 2.3838°
- Longitude of ascending node: 222.96°
- Argument of perihelion: 170.75°

Physical characteristics
- Dimensions: 2.97 km (calculated)
- Synodic rotation period: 5.17±0.01 h 5.18±0.02 h
- Geometric albedo: 0.20 (assumed)
- Spectral type: S
- Absolute magnitude (H): 15.0 · 15.18±0.30

7816 Hanoi, provisional designation 1987 YA, is an eccentric stony asteroid and Mars-crosser from the inner regions of the asteroid belt, approximately 3 kilometers in diameter. It was discovered on 18 December 1987, by Japanese astronomer Masahiro Koishikawa at the Ayashi Station (391) of the Sendai Astronomical Observatory, Japan, and later named after the Vietnamese capital of Hanoi.

== Orbit and classification ==
Hanoi orbits the Sun in the inner main-belt at a distance of 1.6–3.0 AU once every 3 years and 6 months (1,287 days). Its orbit has an eccentricity of 0.29 and an inclination of 2° with respect to the ecliptic. No precoveries were taken. The asteroid's observation arc begins with its official discovery observation.

== Physical characteristics ==
=== Lightcurves ===
In November 2011, a rotational lightcurve of Hanoi was obtained from photometric observations made American astronomer by Brian Warner at his Palmer Divide Observatory in Colorado. The lightcurve gave a rotation period of 5.18±0.02 hours with a brightness variation of 0.72 magnitude (U=2+). Ten years later, remeasurements of the original images rendered a slightly refined period of 5.17±0.01 and an amplitude of 0.77 (U=3-).

=== Diameter and albedo ===
The Collaborative Asteroid Lightcurve Link assumes a standard albedo for stony asteroids of 0.20, and calculates a diameter of 3.0 kilometers with an absolute magnitude of 15.0.

== Naming ==
This minor planet was named after the city of Hanoi, capital of Vietnam, which the discoverer visited in 1997. Together with astronomer Yoshihide Kozai, after whom the minor planet 3040 Kozai is named, he assisted local astronomers install a Schmidt-Cassegrain and a refracting telescope at HNUE. The installed instrumentation was funded by the Japanese Sumitomo Foundation, with the intention to foster Vietnamese astronomical research. The official naming citation was published by the Minor Planet Center on 2 February 1999 (M.P.C. 33790).

== See also ==
- List of astronomical objects discovered by Masahiro Koishikawa
