= 3823 Yorii =

Asteroid

Discovery
- Discovered by: M. Arai; H. Mori
- Discovery site: Yorii Obs.
- Discovery date: 10 March 1988

Designations
- Named after: Yorii (Japanese town)
- Alternative designations: 1988 EC_{1} · 1966 BS; 1975 TV_{3} · 1977 DM_{4} 1980 TH_{2} · 1982 BP_{8} 1986 WU_{2}
- Minor planet category: main-belt · (outer)

Orbital characteristics
- Epoch 4 September 2017 (JD 2458000.5)
- Uncertainty parameter 0
- Observation arc: 49.55 yr (18,098 days)
- Aphelion: 3.8268 AU
- Perihelion: 2.3039 AU
- Semi-major axis: 3.0654 AU
- Eccentricity: 0.2484
- Orbital period (sidereal): 5.37 yr (1,960 days)
- Mean anomaly: 202.60°
- Mean motion: 0° 11^{m} 0.96^{s} / day
- Inclination: 5.5061°
- Longitude of ascending node: 112.03°
- Argument of perihelion: 15.510°

Physical characteristics
- Dimensions: 9.36±3.02 km 10.60±2.42 km 12.438±0.111 km 13.98 km (calculated)
- Synodic rotation period: 6.669±0.005 h
- Geometric albedo: 0.057 (assumed); 0.091±0.014; 0.10±0.05; 0.10±0.12; 0.1041±0.0183
- Spectral type: C
- Absolute magnitude (H): 12.6 · 12.84±0.34 · 13.00 · 13.22

3823 Yorii, provisional designation 1988 EC_{1}, is a carbonaceous asteroid from the outer region of the asteroid belt, approximately 11 kilometers in diameter.

The asteroid was discovered on 10 March 1988, by Japanese amateur astronomers Masaru Arai and Hiroshi Mori at Yorii Observatory (875) in central Japan. It was named for the Japanese town of Yorii, location of the discovering observatory.

== Orbit and classification ==
Yorii orbits the Sun in the outer main-belt at a distance of 2.3–3.8 AU once every 5 years and 4 months (1,960 days). Its orbit has an eccentricity of 0.25 and an inclination of 6° with respect to the ecliptic. It was first identified as 1966 BS at Purple Mountain Observatory in 1966, extending the body's observation arc by 22 years prior to its official discovery observation at Yorii.

== Physical characteristics ==
Yorii has been characterized as a carbonaceous C-type asteroid by PanSTARRS' photometric survey.

=== Rotation period ===
In October 2013, American astronomer Brian Warner obtained a rotational lightcurve of Yorii from photometric observations taken at his Palmer Divide Observatory (716), Colorado. Lightcurve analysis gave a well-defined rotation period of 6.669 hours with a brightness variation of 0.26 magnitude (U=3).

=== Diameter and albedo ===
According to the survey carried out by NASA's Wide-field Infrared Survey Explorer with its subsequent NEOWISE mission, Yorii measures between 9.36 and 12.44 kilometers in diameter, and its surface has an albedo between 0.091 and 0.104. The Collaborative Asteroid Lightcurve Link assumes a standard albedo for carbonaceous asteroids of 0.057 and calculates a diameter of 13.98 kilometers with an absolute magnitude of 13.00.

== Naming ==
This minor planet was named for Yorii, a Japanese town and location of the discovering Yorii Observatory. Yorii is located in the Ōsato District of the Saitama Prefecture in Japan's central Kantō region. The Dodaira Observatory of Tokyo Astronomical Observatory is also located near Yorii. The official naming citation was published by the Minor Planet Center on 27 August 1988 (M.P.C. 13483).
