= Nishibun Station =

Railway station in Geisei, Kōchi Prefecture, Japan

Nishibun Station 西分駅
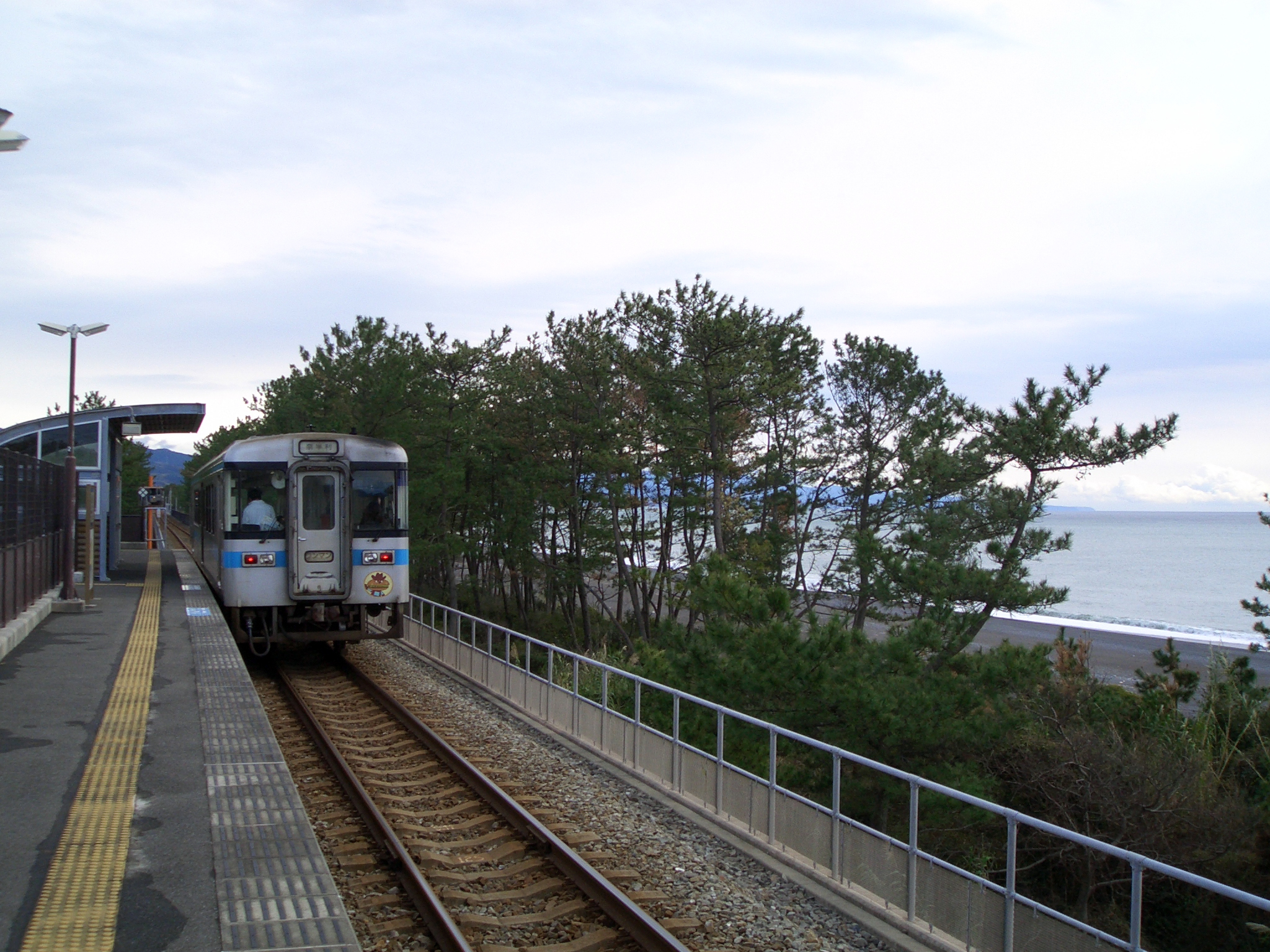
- Nishibun Station in 2010

General information
- Location: Nishibun, Geisei-mura, Aki-gun, Kōchi-ken 781-5700; Japan
- Coordinates: 33°31′04″N 133°47′26″E
- Operator: Tosa Kuroshio Railway
- Line: ■ Asa Line
- Distance: 16.4 km from Gomen
- Platforms: 1 side platform
- Tracks: 1

Construction
- Structure type: Elevated
- Parking: Available
- Accessible: No - steps to platform

Other information
- Status: Unstaffed
- Station code: GN32

History
- Opened: 1 July 2002

Passengers
- FY2011: 39 daily
Location
- Location within Kochi Prefecture Location within Japan

Nishibun Station (西分駅, Nishibun-eki) is a passenger railway station located in the village of Geisei, Aki District, Kōchi Prefecture, Japan. It is operated by the third-sector Tosa Kuroshio Railway with the station number "GN32".

== Lines ==
The station is served by the Asa Line and is located 16.4 km from the beginning of the line at Gomen. Local trains and rapid trains that run in the morning stop at the station from 2021.

== Layout ==
The station consists of a side platform serving a single elevated track. There is no station building but a shelter with both an enclosed and an open section is provided on the platform for waiting passengers. Access to the platform is by a flight of steps. Parking lots for cars are provided near the station entrance.

== Adjacent stations ==
«	Service	»
Asa Line
Rapid: Does not stop at this station
Yasu	Local	Wajiki

== Station mascot ==
Each station on the Asa Line features a cartoon mascot character designed by Takashi Yanase, a local cartoonist from Kōchi Prefecture. The mascot for Yasu Station is an angel with a round yellow face like the moon. She is named Nishibun Tsukiko-chan (にしぶん つきこちゃん). This is because the nearby beach is popular as a sightseeing spot by moonlight.

== History ==
The train station was opened on 1 July 2002 by the Tosa Kuroshio Railway as an intermediate station on its track from Gomen to Nahari.

== Passenger statistics ==
In fiscal 2011, the station was used by an average of 39 passengers daily.

== Surrounding area ==
The station is located in a residential area on the coast.

== See also ==
- List of railway stations in Japan
