= Hiroshi Mori (astronomer) =

Japanese astronomer (born 1958)

Minor planets discovered: 45
see § List of discovered minor planets

Hiroshi Mori (森 弘, Mori Hiroshi; born 1958) is a Japanese amateur astronomer and discoverer of minor planets.

The Minor Planet Center credits him with the discovery of 45 numbered minor planets in collaboration with amateur astronomer Masaru Arai at Yorii Observatory during 1988–1991.

The main-belt asteroid 19190 Morihiroshi, discovered by Japanese astronomers Tsutomu Hioki and Shuji Hayakawa in 1992, was named in his honor. Naming citation was published on 6 January 2003 (M.P.C. 47301).

== List of discovered minor planets ==
| 3823 Yorii | 10 March 1988 | list^{[A]} |
| 3996 Fugaku | 5 December 1988 | list^{[A]} |
| 4262 DeVorkin | 5 February 1989 | list^{[A]} |
| 4291 Kodaihasu | 2 November 1989 | list^{[A]} |
| 4495 Dassanowsky | 6 November 1988 | list^{[A]} |
| 4901 Ó Briain | 3 November 1988 | list^{[A]} |
| (5732) 1988 WC | 29 November 1988 | list^{[A]} |
| (5746) 1991 CK | 5 February 1991 | list^{[A]} |
| (5913) 1990 BU | 21 January 1990 | list^{[A]} |
| 6299 Reizoutoyoko | 5 December 1988 | list^{[A]} |
| (6325) 1991 EA1 | 14 March 1991 | list^{[A]} |
| 6380 Gardel | 10 February 1988 | list^{[A]} |
| (6638) 1989 CA | 2 February 1989 | list^{[A]} |
| (6703) 1988 CH | 10 February 1988 | list^{[A]} |
| (6704) 1988 CJ | 10 February 1988 | list^{[A]} |
| 6709 Hiromiyuki | 2 February 1989 | list^{[A]} |
| (6823) 1988 ED1 | 12 March 1988 | list^{[A]} |
| (6900) 1988 XD1 | 2 December 1988 | list^{[A]} |
| (7409) 1990 BS | 21 January 1990 | list^{[A]} |
| (7417) 1990 YE | 19 December 1990 | list^{[A]} |
| (7522) 1991 AJ | 9 January 1991 | list^{[A]} |
| (7570) 1989 CP | 5 February 1989 | list^{[A]} |
| (7576) 1990 BN | 21 January 1990 | list^{[A]} |
| (7643) 1988 VQ_{1} | 6 November 1988 | list^{[A]} |
| (8484) 1988 VM_{2} | 10 November 1988 | list^{[A]} |

| (8506) 1991 CN | 5 February 1991 | list^{[A]} |
| (9952) 1991 AK | 9 January 1991 | list^{[A]} |
| 10776 Musashitomiyo | 12 February 1991 | list^{[A]} |
| (11038) 1989 EE_{1} | 8 March 1989 | list^{[A]} |
| 11515 Oshijyo | 12 February 1991 | list^{[A]} |
| (12255) 1988 XR_{1} | 7 December 1988 | list^{[A]} |
| 13017 Owakenoomi | 18 March 1988 | list^{[A]} |
| (15737) 1991 CL | 5 February 1991 | list^{[A]} |
| (16431) 1988 VH_{1} | 6 November 1988 | list^{[A]} |
| (16432) 1988 VL_{2} | 10 November 1988 | list^{[A]} |
| (16526) 1991 DC | 17 February 1991 | list^{[A]} |
| (19979) 1989 VJ | 2 November 1989 | list^{[A]} |
| (20001) 1991 CM | 5 February 1991 | list^{[A]} |
| (21017) 1988 VP | 3 November 1988 | list^{[A]} |
| (23479) 1991 CG | 5 February 1991 | list^{[A]} |
| (39537) 1990 VV_{2} | 12 November 1990 | list^{[A]} |
| (43773) 1989 AJ | 4 January 1989 | list^{[A]} |
| (48436) 1989 VK | 2 November 1989 | list^{[A]} |
| (52269) 1988 CU | 13 February 1988 | list^{[A]} |
| (65677) 1989 EB_{1} | 1 March 1989 | list^{[A]} |
Co-discovery made with:^{A} M. Arai

== See also ==
- List of minor planet discoverers § H. Mori
