= 2571 Geisei =

Stony Florian asteroid from the inner regions of the asteroid belt

Discovery
- Discovered by: T. Seki
- Discovery site: Geisei Obs.
- Discovery date: 23 October 1981

Designations
- Named after: Geisei (Japanese village)
- Alternative designations: 1981 UC · 1931 TA_{4} 1934 NV · 1944 OD; 1961 XG · 1981 WR_{6} A911 UC
- Minor planet category: main-belt · Flora

Orbital characteristics
- Epoch 4 September 2017 (JD 2458000.5)
- Uncertainty parameter 0
- Observation arc: 85.64 yr (31,280 days)
- Aphelion: 2.6607 AU
- Perihelion: 1.7953 AU
- Semi-major axis: 2.2280 AU
- Eccentricity: 0.1942
- Orbital period (sidereal): 3.33 yr (1,215 days)
- Mean anomaly: 317.69°
- Mean motion: 0° 17^{m} 47.04^{s} / day
- Inclination: 2.8722°
- Longitude of ascending node: 66.915°
- Argument of perihelion: 284.78°

Physical characteristics
- Dimensions: 5.21±0.95 km 5.23±1.07 km 6.582±0.035 km 6.81 km (calculated)
- Synodic rotation period: 7.823±0.005 h
- Geometric albedo: 0.24 (assumed); 0.2573±0.0688; 0.275±0.059; 0.34±0.14; 0.38±0.24
- Spectral type: S
- Absolute magnitude (H): 12.9 · 13.0 · 13.32±0.26 · 13.38

2571 Geisei, provisional designation 1981 UC, is a stony Florian asteroid from the inner regions of the asteroid belt, approximately 6 kilometers in diameter. It was discovered by Japanese astronomer Tsutomu Seki at Geisei Observatory on 23 October 1981, and named for the Japanese village of Geisei.

== Classification and Orbit ==
Geisei is a member of the Flora family, one of the largest families of stony asteroids. It orbits the Sun in the inner main-belt at a distance of 1.8–2.7 AU once every 3 years and 4 months (1,215 days). Its orbit has an eccentricity of 0.19 and an inclination of 3° with respect to the ecliptic.

In October 1911, Geisei was first identified as A911 UC at Heidelberg Observatory. The asteroid's observation arc begins 50 years prior to its discovery, with a precovery taken at Lowell Observatory in 1931.

== Physical characteristics ==
=== Lightcurves ===
A rotational lightcurve for this asteroid was obtained from photometric observations made at the Australian Oakley Southern Sky Observatory (E09) in September 2014. The lightcurve gave a rotation period of 7.823±0.005 hours with a brightness variation of 0.50 in magnitude (U=3-).

=== Diameter and albedo ===
According to the 2015/16 NEOWISE mission results of NASA's space-based Wide-field Infrared Survey Explorer, Geisei measures 5.21 and 5.23 kilometers in diameter and its surface has an albedo of 0.34 and 0.38, respectively. Preliminary WISE results gave a diameter of 6.582 kilometers and an albedo of 0.275.

The Collaborative Asteroid Lightcurve Link assumes an albedo of 0.24 – derived from 8 Flora, the largest member and namesake of the Flora family – and calculates a diameter of 6.81 kilometers using an absolute magnitude of 13.0.

== Naming ==
This minor planet is named after the small Japanese village of Geisei, where the discovering observatory is located. Geisei is situated near the city of Kōchi, after which Tsutomu Seki's first discovery, the asteroid 2396 Kochi, is named. The approved naming citation was published by the Minor Planet Center on 6 June 1982 (M.P.C. 6956).
