= 6709 Hiromiyuki =

Main-belt asteroid

Discovery
- Discovered by: M. Arai; H. Mori
- Discovery site: Yorii Obs.
- Discovery date: 2 February 1989

Designations
- Named after: Hiroyuki and Miyuki (Discoverer's children)
- Alternative designations: 1989 CD · 1955 SX; 1973 UM_{3} · 1991 RX_{7}
- Minor planet category: main-belt · (inner) background · Flora

Orbital characteristics
- Epoch 23 March 2018 (JD 2458200.5)
- Uncertainty parameter 0
- Observation arc: 62.44 yr (22,808 d)
- Aphelion: 2.7247 AU
- Perihelion: 1.9728 AU
- Semi-major axis: 2.3488 AU
- Eccentricity: 0.1601
- Orbital period (sidereal): 3.60 yr (1,315 d)
- Mean anomaly: 72.976°
- Mean motion: 0° 16^{m} 25.68^{s} / day
- Inclination: 1.8269°
- Longitude of ascending node: 98.983°
- Argument of perihelion: 343.31°

Physical characteristics
- Mean diameter: 3.975±0.519 km 4.50 km (calculated)
- Synodic rotation period: 6.828±0.001 h
- Geometric albedo: 0.24 (assumed); 0.338±0.103
- Spectral type: S (assumed)
- Absolute magnitude (H): 13.80; 13.9

6709 Hiromiyuki, provisional designation 1989 CD, is a background or Florian asteroid from the inner regions of the asteroid belt, approximately 4 kilometers (2.5 miles) in diameter. It was discovered on 2 February 1989, by Japanese amateur astronomers Masaru Arai and Hiroshi Mori at the Yorii Observatory in Japan. The possibly elongated S-type asteroid has a rotation period of 6.8 hours. It was named after the Hiroshi Mori's children, Hiroyuki and Miyuki.

== Orbit and classification ==
Hiromiyuki is a non-family asteroid of the main belt's background population when applying the hierarchical clustering method to its proper orbital elements. Based on osculating Keplerian orbital elements, the asteroid has also been classified as a member of the Flora family (402), a giant asteroid family and the largest family of stony asteroids in the main-belt.

Hiromiyuki orbits the Sun in the inner asteroid belt at a distance of 2.0–2.7 AU once every 3 years and 7 months (1,315 days; semi-major axis of 2.35 AU). Its orbit has an eccentricity of 0.16 and an inclination of 2° with respect to the ecliptic. The body's observation arc begins with its first observation as 1955 SX at Goethe Link Observatory in September 1955, more than 33 years prior to its official discovery observation at Yorii.

== Physical characteristics ==
Hiromiyuki is an assumed S-type asteroid based on its classification into the Flora family.

=== Rotation period ===
In February 2007, a rotational lightcurve of Hiromiyuki was obtained from photometric observations by Donald P. Pray at Carbuncle Hill Observatory (912), in collaboration with Adrián Galád, Marek Husárik, and Julian Oey. Lightcurve analysis gave a rotation period of 6.828 hours with an exceptionally high brightness amplitude of 1.00±0.02 magnitude (U=3), which typically indicates that the body has an elongated shape.

=== Diameter and albedo ===
According to the survey carried out by the NEOWISE mission of NASA's Wide-field Infrared Survey Explorer, Hiromiyuki measures 3.98 kilometers in diameter and its surface has a high albedo of 0.34. The Collaborative Asteroid Lightcurve Link assumes an albedo of 0.24 – derived from 8 Flora, the parent body of the Flora family – and calculates a diameter of 4.50 kilometers based on an absolute magnitude of 13.9.

== Naming ==
This minor planet was named after Hiroyuki (born 1991) and Miyuki Mori (born 1993), son and daughter of the second co-discoverer Hiroshi Mori. The official naming citation was published by the Minor Planet Center on 6 March 2004 (M.P.C. 51186).
