= 6244 Okamoto =

Background asteroid and binary system

Discovery
- Discovered by: T. Seki
- Discovery site: Geisei Obs.
- Discovery date: 20 August 1990

Designations
- Named after: Hiroshi Okamoto (Japanese school teacher)
- Alternative designations: 1990 QF · 1952 SG_{1} 1987 SL_{25}
- Minor planet category: main-belt · (inner) background · Flora

Orbital characteristics
- Epoch 23 March 2018 (JD 2458200.5)
- Uncertainty parameter 0
- Observation arc: 84.58 yr (30,893 d)
- Aphelion: 2.4888 AU
- Perihelion: 1.8319 AU
- Semi-major axis: 2.1604 AU
- Eccentricity: 0.1520
- Orbital period (sidereal): 3.18 yr (1,160 d)
- Mean anomaly: 208.44°
- Mean motion: 0° 18^{m} 37.44^{s} / day
- Inclination: 5.3954°
- Longitude of ascending node: 331.33°
- Argument of perihelion: 51.576°
- Known satellites: 1 (D: 1.67 km P: 20.32 h)

Physical characteristics
- Mean diameter: 4.59 km (derived); 6.69 km (estimated)
- Synodic rotation period: 2.8958±0.00009 h 2.8958±0.0001 h 2.89585±0.00009 h 2.899±0.003 h
- Geometric albedo: 0.14 (estimated); 0.24 (assumed)
- Spectral type: S (assumed)
- Absolute magnitude (H): 13.41±0.04 (R); 13.5; 13.66±0.26; 13.9

6244 Okamoto, provisional designation 1990 QF, is a background asteroid and binary system from the inner regions of the asteroid belt, approximately 5 kilometers (3 miles) in diameter. It was discovered on 20 August 1990, by Japanese astronomer Tsutomu Seki at the Geisei Observatory in Kōchi, Japan, and later named after Japanese school teacher Hiroshi Okamoto. The presumed S-type asteroid has a short rotation period of 2.9 hours. The discovery of its minor-planet moon was announced in October 2006.

== Orbit and classification ==
Okamoto is a non-family asteroid of the main belt's background population when applying the hierarchical clustering method to its proper orbital elements. Based on osculating Keplerian orbital elements, the asteroid has also been classified as a member of the Flora family (402), a giant asteroid family and the largest family of stony asteroids in the main-belt.

It orbits the Sun in the inner asteroid belt at a distance of 1.8–2.5 AU once every 3 years and 2 months (1,160 days; semi-major axis of 2.16 AU). Its orbit has an eccentricity of 0.15 and an inclination of 5° with respect to the ecliptic. The body's observation arc begins with a precovery taken at the Uccle Observatory in September 1933, nearly 57 years prior to its official discovery observation at Geisei.

== Physical characteristics ==
Okamoto is an assumed S-type asteroid, the most common spectral type in the inner asteroid belt.

=== Rotation period ===
Several rotational lightcurves of Okamoto have been obtained from photometric observations since 2006. Analysis of the best-rated lightcurve gave a well-defined rotation period of 2.8958 hours with a consolidated brightness amplitude between 0.11 and 0.15 magnitude (U=3).

=== Diameter and albedo ===
The Collaborative Asteroid Lightcurve Link assumes an albedo of 0.24 – taken from 8 Flora, the parent body of the Flora family – and derives a diameter of 4.59 kilometers based on an absolute magnitude of 13.9. Based on an assumed albedo of 0.14, the Johnston's archive estimates a diameter of 6.69 and 6.89 kilometer for the primary and the combined system, respectively (see below).

=== Satellite ===
In 2006, photometric observations obtained by David Higgins (E14) at Canberra, Australia, Donald Pray at Carbuncle Hill Observatory (912), as well as Peter Kušnirák and Petr Pravec at Ondřejov Observatory revealed that Okamoto is a synchronous binary asteroid with a minor-planet moon orbiting it every 20.32 hours at an estimated average distance of 13 km. The discovery was announced on 19 October 2006. The mutual occultation events indicated the presence of a satellite 25% the size of its primary, which translates into an estimated diameter of 1.15–1.67 kilometers depending on the underlying size estimate of the primary.

== Naming ==
This minor planet was named after Japanese Entomologist and elementary-school teacher Hiroshi Okamoto (born 1915), who inspired the discoverer Tsutomu Seki with a love of the stars. The official naming citation was published by the Minor Planet Center on 10 June 1998 (M.P.C. 32093).
