= 3822 Segovia =

Asteroid

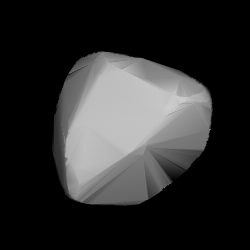
- Shape model of Segovia from its lightcurve

Discovery
- Discovered by: T. Seki
- Discovery site: Geisei Obs.
- Discovery date: 21 February 1988

Designations
- Named after: Andrés Segovia (classical guitarist)
- Alternative designations: 1988 DP_{1} · 1962 ST; 1976 YE_{2} · 1979 UP; 1986 WV_{9}
- Minor planet category: main-belt · Flora

Orbital characteristics
- Epoch 4 September 2017 (JD 2458000.5)
- Uncertainty parameter 0
- Observation arc: 54.18 yr (19,789 days)
- Aphelion: 2.5360 AU
- Perihelion: 2.0033 AU
- Semi-major axis: 2.2697 AU
- Eccentricity: 0.1173
- Orbital period (sidereal): 3.42 yr (1,249 days)
- Mean anomaly: 159.41°
- Mean motion: 0° 17^{m} 17.52^{s} / day
- Inclination: 2.5596°
- Longitude of ascending node: 335.91°
- Argument of perihelion: 280.43°

Physical characteristics
- Mean diameter: 4.94 km (calculated)
- Synodic rotation period: 11.03204±0.00001 h
- Geometric albedo: 0.24 (assumed)
- Spectral type: S
- Absolute magnitude (H): 13.7 · 13.69±0.52

3822 Segovia (prov. designation: 1988 DP_{1}) is a stony Flora asteroid from the inner regions of the asteroid belt. It was discovered by Japanese astronomer Tsutomu Seki at Geisei Observatory in Kōchi, Japan, on 21 February 1988. The presumed S-type asteroid has a rotation period of 11.0 hours and measures approximately 5 kilometers (3.1 miles) in diameter. It was later named after Spanish guitarist Andrés Segovia.

== Orbit and classification ==
The S-type asteroid is a member of the Flora family, one of the largest groups of stony asteroids in the main-belt. It orbits the Sun in the inner main-belt at a distance of 2.0–2.5 AU once every 3 years and 5 months (1,249 days). Its orbit has an eccentricity of 0.12 and an inclination of 3° with respect to the ecliptic. It was first observed as 1962 ST at the Karl Schwarzschild Observatory in 1962, extending the body's observation arc by 26 years prior to its official discovery observation.

== Naming ==
This minor planet was named for world-famous virtuoso classical guitarist Andrés Segovia (1893–1987). In 1959, the discoverer attended one of his concerts in Japan and became inspired to play the guitar. The official naming citation was published by the Minor Planet Center on 21 April 1989 (M.P.C. 14481).

== Physical characteristics ==
In March 2016, a rotation period of Segovia was published using data from the Lowell Photometric Database (LPD). Using lightcurve inversion and convex shape models, as well as distributed computing power and the help of individual volunteers, a period of 11.03204±0.00001 hours could be obtained for this asteroid from the LPD's sparse-in-time photometry data (U=n.a.). The Collaborative Asteroid Lightcurve Link assumes an albedo of 0.24 – derived from 8 Flora, the largest member and namesake of this orbital family – and calculates a diameter of 4.9 kilometers with an absolute magnitude of 13.7.
