= Masaru Arai =

Japanese astronomer (born 1952)

Minor planets discovered: 45
see § List of discovered minor planets

Masaru Arai (新井 優, Arai Masaru; born 1952) is a Japanese amateur astronomer and a discoverer of minor planets and comets.

He is credited by the Minor Planet Center with the discovery of 45 minor planets during 1988–1991, all in collaboration with astronomer Hiroshi Mori. On 5 January 1991, he has also discovered Comet Arai, C/1991 A2.

The main-belt asteroid 21082 Araimasaru, discovered by Tsutomu Hioki and Shuji Hayakawa at Okutama in 1991, was named in his honor. Naming citation was published on 6 January 2003 (M.P.C. 47301).

== List of discovered minor planets ==
3823 Yorii	10 March 1988	list^{[A]}
3996 Fugaku	5 December 1988	list^{[A]}
4262 DeVorkin	5 February 1989	list^{[A]}
4291 Kodaihasu	2 November 1989	list^{[A]}
4495 Dassanowsky	6 November 1988	list^{[A]}
4901 Ó Briain	3 November 1988	list^{[A]}
(5732) 1988 WC	29 November 1988	list^{[A]}
(5746) 1991 CK	5 February 1991	list^{[A]}
(5913) 1990 BU	21 January 1990	list^{[A]}
6299 Reizoutoyoko	5 December 1988	list^{[A]}
(6325) 1991 EA1	14 March 1991	list^{[A]}
6380 Gardel	10 February 1988	list^{[A]}
(6638) 1989 CA	2 February 1989	list^{[A]}
(6703) 1988 CH	10 February 1988	list^{[A]}
(6704) 1988 CJ	10 February 1988	list^{[A]}
6709 Hiromiyuki	2 February 1989	list^{[A]}
(6823) 1988 ED1	12 March 1988	list^{[A]}
(6900) 1988 XD1	2 December 1988	list^{[A]}

(7409) 1990 BS	21 January 1990	list^{[A]}
(7417) 1990 YE	19 December 1990	list^{[A]}
(7522) 1991 AJ	9 January 1991	list^{[A]}
(7570) 1989 CP	5 February 1989	list^{[A]}
(7576) 1990 BN	21 January 1990	list^{[A]}
(7643) 1988 VQ_{1}	6 November 1988	list^{[A]}
(8484) 1988 VM_{2}	10 November 1988	list^{[A]}
(8506) 1991 CN	5 February 1991	list^{[A]}
(9952) 1991 AK	9 January 1991	list^{[A]}
10776 Musashitomiyo	12 February 1991	list^{[A]}
(11038) 1989 EE_{1}	8 March 1989	list^{[A]}
11515 Oshijyo	12 February 1991	list^{[A]}
(12255) 1988 XR_{1}	7 December 1988	list^{[A]}
13017 Owakenoomi	18 March 1988	list^{[A]}
(15737) 1991 CL	5 February 1991	list^{[A]}
(16431) 1988 VH_{1}	6 November 1988	list^{[A]}
(16432) 1988 VL_{2}	10 November 1988	list^{[A]}
(16526) 1991 DC	17 February 1991	list^{[A]}

(19979) 1989 VJ	2 November 1989	list^{[A]}
(20001) 1991 CM	5 February 1991	list^{[A]}
(21017) 1988 VP	3 November 1988	list^{[A]}
(23479) 1991 CG	5 February 1991	list^{[A]}
(39537) 1990 VV_{2}	12 November 1990	list^{[A]}
(43773) 1989 AJ	4 January 1989	list^{[A]}
(48436) 1989 VK	2 November 1989	list^{[A]}
(52269) 1988 CU	13 February 1988	list^{[A]}
(65677) 1989 EB_{1}	1 March 1989	list^{[A]}
Co-discovery made with: ^{A} H. Mori
