= List of asteroid-discovering observatories =

The list of asteroid-discovering observatories contains a section for each observatory which has discovered one or more asteroids, along with a list of those asteroids.

For each numbered asteroid, the Minor Planet Center lists one or more discoverers who have been given credit for the discovery. Sometimes these are individuals (by modern rules there can be no more than three co-discoverers), and sometimes the credit is given to an organization (for instance, Purple Mountain Observatory).

Known Near-Earth objects – as of January 2018 Video (0:55; July 23, 2018)

== Observatories ==
=== Andrushivka Astronomical Observatory ===
The Andrushivka Astronomical Observatory is a private observatory near Andrushivka in Zhytomyr oblast, Ukraine. The observatory has IAU observatory code A50.

It has discovered the following asteroids:

- 117240 Zhytomyr
- 120405 Svyatylivka
- 133293 Andrushivka
- 152217 Akosipov
- 155116 Verkhivnya
- 157271 Gurtovenko
- 159011 Radomyshl
- 159181 Berdychiv
- 161962 Galchyn
- 175636 Zvyagel
- 177982 Popilnia
- 181249 Tkachenko
- 185250 Korostyshiv
- 190026 Iskorosten
- 199986 Chervone
- 202778 Dmytria
- 207585 Lubar
- 207653 Anatolymokrenko
- 207695 Olgakopyl
- 207899 Grinmalia
- 212465 Goroshky
- 212723 Klitschko
- 214487 Baranivka
- 216451 Irsha
- 216910 Vnukov
- 217420 Olevsk
- 220418 Golovyno
- 221073 Ovruch
- 226858 Ivanpuluj
- 227326 Narodychi
- 235615
- 239307 Kruchynenko
- 240381 Emilchyne
- 241192 Pulyny
- 241538 Chudniv
- 243204 Kubanchoria
- 245890 Krynychenka
- 246132 Lugyny
- 246164 Zdvyzhensk
- 251001 Sluch
- 251018 Liubirena
- 251449 Olexakorol'
- 253536 Tymchenko
- 261691
- 262418 Samofalov
- 263349 Ivanslyota
- 266574
- 269245 Catastini
- 269251 Kolomna
- 269252 Bogdanstupka
- 274300 UNESCO
- 274301 Wikipedia
- 274333 Voznyukigor
- 274334 Kyivplaniy
- 274843 Mykhailopetrenko
- 275225 Kotarbinski
- 278386 Sofivanna
- 278609 Avrudenko
- 278645 Kontsevych
- 281459 Kyrylenko
- 284754
- 287875 Pavlokorsun
- 290127 Linakostenko
- 291855 Calabròcorrado
- 291923 Kuzmaskryabin
- 293707 Govoradloanatoly
- 294814 Nataliakidalova
- 295329
- 295492
- 295841 Gorbulin
- 295842
- 296987 Piotrflin
- 300932 Kyslyuk
- 302932 Francoballoni
- 311784
- 311786 Mykolaleontovych
- 315276 Yurigradovsky
- 315492
- 316084 Mykolapokropyvny
- 318794 Uglia
- 325368 Ihorhuk
- 325372
- 328509 Kostyahrubych
- 329637
- 330753
- 332084 Vasyakulbeda
- 332409
- 332434
- 335416
- 336094
- 336470
- 341109
- 342666
- 345848
- 348239 Societadante
- 352167
- 352654
- 354252
- 355683
- 361329
- 361674
- 369274
- 379350
- 379355
- 380590
- 384074
- 386102
- 386167
- 388057
- 388952
- 391834
- 394805
- 398474
- 399673 Kadenyuk
- 402964
- 424648
- 436049
- 436371
- 438571
- 440794 Wytrzyszczak
- 456963
- 485152
- 490218
- 542509 Lyatoshynsky
- 545565 Borysten
- 545571
- 552746 Annanobili
- 553728
- 554709 Magdastavinschi
- 572434
- 572657
- 572986
- 574524
- 575185
- 575274
- 575279
- 591127
- 599461
- 602555
- 602984
- 603602
- 608853
- 632542
- 634421
- 638747
- 645348
- 657303
- 663645
- 675607
- 696485

=== Bohyunsan Optical Astronomy Observatory ===
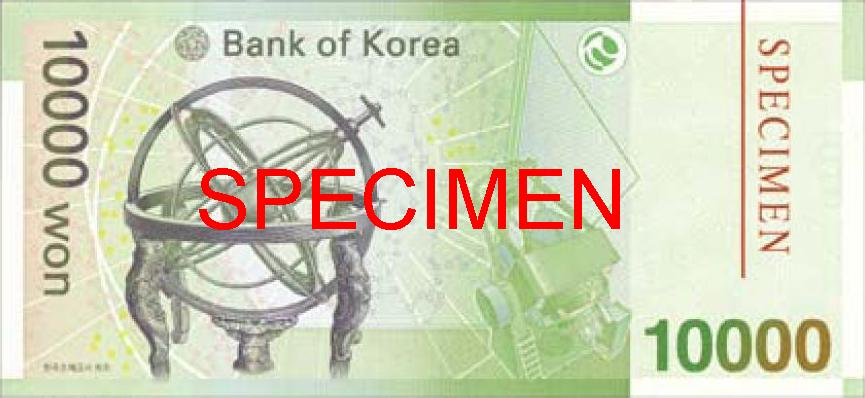
The telescope atop Mount Bohyeon is among the items pictured on the back of the country's 10,000 won note.

The Korean Bohyunsan Optical Astronomy Observatory (BOAO), located at Mount Bohyeon near the city of Yeongcheon, is a member of the East-Asian Planet Search Network, an international collaboration between Korea, China and Japan. Each facility, BOAO (Korea), Xinglong Station (NAOC) (China), and Okayama Astrophysical Observatory (Japan), has a 2 m class telescope, a high dispersion echelle spectrograph, and an iodine absorption cell for precise RV measurements, looking for extrasolar planets.

It has discovered the following asteroids:

- 34666 Bohyunsan
- 63145 Choemuseon
- 63156 Yicheon
- 68719 Jangyeongsil
- 72021 Yisunji
- 72059 Heojun
- 94400 Hongdaeyong
- 95016 Kimjeongho
- 99503 Leewonchul
- 106817 Yubangtaek
- 118931
- 123532
- 123741
- 126172
- 126578 Suhhosoo
- 149119
- 153236
- 155813
- 156550
- 156984
- 161021
- 165390
- 165406
- 166139
- 166143
- 168878
- 168911
- 174076
- 179553
- 182205
- 189787
- 193158 Haechan
- 193397
- 193457
- 193487
- 201424
- 203603
- 201424
- 203603
- 205557
- 205834
- 208538
- 219878
- 225969
- 228384
- 234637
- 234651
- 244269
- 247151
- 250028
- 250035
- 252128
- 257944
- 270440
- 279960
- 285801
- 286606
- 287454
- 302083
- 306710
- 307120
- 310514
- 313113
- 322925
- 323107
- 336894
- 337292
- 347579
- 350819
- 354147
- 416027
- 434010
- 455297
- 483458
- 550921
- 553454
- 579256
- 595046
- 595273
- 612206
- 623993
- 635074
- 640408
- 640409
- 640412
- 641141

=== Cerro El Roble Astronomical Station ===
Between 1968 and 1982, Carlos Torres discovered or co-discovered with S. Cofré and others a number of asteroids from the Chilean Cerro El Roble Station. It has discovered the following asteroids:

- 1973 Colocolo
- 1974 Caupolican
- 1992 Galvarino
- 1993 Guacolda
- 2013 Tucapel
- 2028 Janequeo
- 2518 Rutllant
- 2654 Ristenpart
- 2741 Valdivia
- 2757 Crisser
- 2784 Domeyko
- 2858 Carlosporter
- 2975 Spahr
- 2976 Lautaro
- 3050 Carrera
- 3114 Ercilla
- 3361 Orpheus
- 3495 Colchagua
- 3691 Bede
- 3708
- 3922 Heather
- 3970 Herran
- 4228 Nemiro
- 4269 Bogado
- 4590 Dimashchegolev
- 4853 Marielukac
- 4878 Gilhutton
- (4881) 1975 XJ
- 5387 Casleo
- 5569 Colby
- 5659 Vergara
- 6217 Kodai
- 6334 Robleonard
- (6888) 1971 BD3
- (6889) 1971 RA
- (6940) 1972 HL1
- (7045) 1974 FJ
- (7151) 1971 SX3
- 7450 Shilling
- 7975
- 8605
- 9917 Keynes
- 10993
- 12660
- 16352
- 17350
- 23401 Brodskaya
- 27655
- 29079
- 32731 Annaivanovna
- 43722 Carloseduardo
- 52225 Panchenko

=== Chichibu Observatory ===
This is the private observatory of Naoto Sato in Chichibu, Saitama, Japan. This Observatory has IAU observatory code 369.

It has discovered the following asteroids:

- 6991 Chichibu
- 7038 Tokorozawa
- 7851 Azumino
- 8581 Johnen
- 8924 Iruma
- 8933 Kurobe
- 9230 Yasuda
- 9418 Mayumi
- 10224 Hisashi
- 10880 Kaguya
- 10916 Okina-Ouna
- 11114
- 11607
- 12027 Masaakitanaka
- 12031 Kobaton
- 12432 Usuda
- 12456 Genichiaraki
- 12460 Mando
- 12469 Katsuura
- 13188 Okinawa
- 13654 Masuda
- 13694
- 15884 Maspalomas
- 15916 Shigeoyamada
- 16716
- 16723 Fumiofuke
- 16790 Yuuzou
- 16796 Shinji
- 16826 Daisuke
- 16853 Masafumi
- 17612 Whiteknight
- 17656 Hayabusa
- 17657 Himawari
- 17666
- 18469 Hakodate
- 18488
- 18520 Wolfratshausen
- 18553 Kinkakuji
- 20193 Yakushima,
- 21250 Kamikouchi
- 21302 Shirakamisanchi
- 21348 Toyoteru
- 22470 Shirakawa-go
- 23586
- 23628 Ichimura
- 23630
- 23638 Nagano
- 23649 Tohoku
- 23963
- 25302 Niim
- 26223 Enari
- 26224
- 26902
- 26990 Culbertson
- 26998 Iriso
- 27918 Azusagawa
- 27982 Atsushimiyazaki
- 27991 Koheijimiura
- 27997 Bandos
- 28173 Hisakichi
- 28174 Harue
- 29420 Ikuo
- 29421
- 29514 Karatsu
- 29644
- 31075
- 31083
- 31084
- 31087 Oirase
- 31095 Buneiou
- 31179 Gongju
- 31199
- 32984
- 32990 Sayo-hime
- 32998
- 33070
- 33088
- 33096
- 35322
- 35400
- 35401
- 37743
- 37746
- 39818
- 43919
- 43949
- 44012
- 48734
- 52479
- 52546
- 52550
- 52623
- 52629
- 53019
- 55883
- 58410
- 58613
- 58614
- 58619
- 58620
- 58662
- 58667
- 65838
- 69411
- 69482
- 69486
- 69490
- 69562
- 73867
- 73968
- 90880
- 90883
- 90951
- 90955
- 90982
- 96319
- 96321
- 96368
- 96369
- 96372
- 100389
- 100499
- 100689
- 100703
- 101431
- 118230 Sado
- 120665
- 120741 Iijimayuichi
- 120974
- 129600
- 136743 Echigo
- 136790
- 160025
- 162144
- 164696
- 175768
- 192452
- 200141
- 210489
- 251709
- 269706
- 297291
- 336762

=== Dynic Astronomical Observatory ===
It has discovered the following asteroids:

- 3997 Taga
- 4289 Biwako
- 4352 Kyoto
- 4461 Sayama
- 4873 Fukaya
- 4952 Kibeshigemaro
- 5008 Miyazawakenji
- 5330 Senrikyu
- 5332 Davidaguilar
- 5435 Kameoka
- 5440 Terao
- 5448 Siebold
- 5618 Saitama
- 5623 Iwamori
- 5825 Rakuyou
- 6024 Ochanomizu
- 6100 Kunitomoikkansai
- 6139 Naomi
- 6199 Yoshiokayayoi
- 6306 Nishimura
- 6321 Namuratakao
- 6326 Idamiyoshi
- 6329 Hikonejyo
- 6655 Nagahama
- 6657 Otukyo
- 6794 Masuisakura
- 7019 Tagayuichan
- 7021 Tomiokamachi
- 7023 Heiankyo
- (7053) 1989 FA
- (7084) 1991 BR
- (7249) 1992 SN
- (7288) 1991 FE1
- (7297) 1992 UG
- (7426) 1992 US4
- (7589) 1992 SR1
- (8094) 1992 UG3
- (8186) 1992 WP3
- (8360) 1990 FD1
- (8366) 1990 UL1
- (9037) 1990 UJ2
- (9061) 1992 WC3
- (9353) 1991 VM4
- (9366) 1992 WR1
- (9970) 1992 ST1
- 10142 Sakka
- 10143 Kamogawa
- 10337
- 10527
- 10535
- 10765
- 10766
- 10909
- 11290
- 11888
- 11923
- 12264
- 12283
- 12308
- 12328
- 12334
- 12349
- 12717
- 12728
- 12744
- 13295
- 13508
- 13512
- 13516
- 13519
- 14381
- 14444
- 14889
- 14970
- 14996
- 15272
- 15305
- 15719
- 15730
- 15750
- 15765
- 16508
- 16523
- 16559
- 17469
- 17515
- 17559
- 18429
- 20085
- 21037
- 21116
- 22331
- 22350
- 23497
- 23845
- 24758
- (26120) 1991 VZ2
- 26208
- 26215
- 26367
- 27771
- 27972
- 29229
- 29309
- 31126
- 32200 Seiicyoshida
- 33028
- (41042) 1999 VB2
- 44500
- (46572) 1991 VA5
- (46573) 1992 AJ1
- (46591) 1992 WS1
- (46716) 1997 NX
- (52631) 1997 WC21
- (58663) 1997 XZ10
- (80664) 2000 BZ10
- (86296) 1999 VA21
- 91233
- 129577
- 148009
- (152575) 1994 GY

=== Emerald Lane Observatory ===
It has discovered the following asteroids:

- 34351 Decatur
- 51599 Brittany
- 61400 Voxandreae
- 62701 Davidrankin
- 64123
- 65260
- 72834 Guywells
- 73073
- 73196
- 78284
- 83596
- 88377
- 92586
- 93164
- 93466
- 93490
- 94404
- 105272
- 105508
- 106096
- 108917
- 112483
- 112484
- 112539
- 114910
- 115492
- 119195
- 120148
- 125266
- 128345 Danielbamberger
- 131327
- 131414
- 131446
- 132296
- 132298
- 140603
- 140632
- 140633
- 142155
- 144553
- 148772
- 153175
- 153757
- 154345
- 156036
- 158330
- 160165
- 163363
- 166422
- 166857
- 170072
- 173449
- 173875
- 177191
- 180683
- 182595
- 183379
- 187987
- 189076
- 193801
- 193947
- 194124
- 195511
- 195874
- 203866
- 205558
- 209155
- 213785
- 219382
- 219590
- 222873
- 237607
- 239965
- 242244
- 243777
- 247588
- 259901
- 264594
- 270980
- 286262
- 286762
- 287059
- 287436
- 287622
- 288473
- 297382
- 298268
- 298353
- 302625
- 313062
- 317288
- 323243
- 333352
- 334264
- 337704
- 337814
- 344229
- 344291
- 344455
- 354414
- 357096
- 373481
- 390557
- 399394
- 405121
- 415816
- 434064
- 601867
- 629360
- 661253

=== Fair Oaks Ranch Observatory ===
It has discovered the following asteroids:

- 13389 Stacey
- 27267 Wiberg
- 29651
- 31318
- 31420
- 37280
- 44468
- 44545
- 47044 Mcpainter
- 49298
- 49465
- 56081
- 76229
- 82076
- 85857
- 106851
- 123747
- 134935
- 138113
- 138563
- 153216
- 155845

=== Geisei Observatory ===
Tsutomu Seki is the director of the Geisei Observatory in Geisei, Kōchi, Japan.

It has discovered the following asteroids:

- 2396 Kochi
- 2571 Geisei
- 2582 Harimaya-Bashi
- 2621 Goto
- 2835 Ryoma
- 2880 Nihondaira
- 2961 Katsurahama
- 3150 Tosa
- 3182 Shimanto
- 3262 Miune
- 3431 Nakano
- 3785 Kitami
- 3822 Segovia
- 3851 Alhambra
- 3914 Kotogahama
- 3935 Toatenmongakkai
- 4039 Souseki
- 4095 Ishizuchisan
- 4097 Tsurugisan
- 4101 Ruikou
- 4223 Shikoku
- 4256 Kagamigawa
- 4290 Heisei
- 4399 Ashizuri
- 4411 Kochibunkyo
- 4439 Muroto
- 4441 Toshie
- 4496 Kamimachi
- 4498 Shinkoyama
- 4505 Okamura
- 4578 Kurashiki
- 4606 Saheki
- 4639 Minox
- 4670 Yoshinogawa
- 4675 Ohboke
- 4841 Manjiro
- 4865 Sor
- 5058 Tarrega
- 5113 Kohno
- 5124 Muraoka
- 5141 Tachibana
- 5179 Takeshima
- (5209) 1989 CW1
- 5815 Shinsengumi
- 5823 Oryo
- 5824 Inagaki
- 5862 Sakanoue
- 5915 Yoshihiro
- 5962 Shikokutenkyo
- 5966 Tomeko
- 5969 Ryuichiro
- 6088 Hoshigakubo
- 6237 Chikushi
- 6244 Okamoto
- 6302 Tengukogen
- 6399 Harada
- 6449 Kudara
- 6458 Nouda
- 6497 Yamasaki
- 6514 Torahiko
- 6606 Makino
- 6660 Matsumoto
- 6699 Igaueno
- 6720 Gifu
- 6925 Susumu
- 6965 Niyodogawa
- 6971 Omogokei
- 7017 Uradowan
- 7094 Godaisan
- 7125 Eitarodate
- 7235 Hitsuzan
- 7274 Washioyama
- 7287 Yokokurayama
- 7289 Kamegamori
- 7410 Kawazoe
- 7415 Susumuimoto
- 7463 Oukawamine
- 7594 Shotaro
- 7650 Kaname
- 7693 Hoshitakuhai
- 8083 Mayeda
- 8163 Ishizaki
- 8234 Nobeoka
- 8367 Bokusui
- 8375 Kenzokohno
- 8387 Fujimori
- 8428 Okiko
- 8485 Satoru
- 8492 Kikuoka
- 8732 Champion
- 8877 Rentaro
- 8957 Koujounotsuki
- 9032 Tanakami
- 9062 Ohnishi
- 9063 Washi
- 9196 Sukagawa
- 9198 Sasagamine
- 9323 Hirohisasato
- 9409 Kanpuzan
- 9745 Shinkenwada
- 9751 Kadota
- 9756 Ezaki
- 9852 Gora
- 9870 Maehata
- 9964 Hideyonoguchi
- 10078 Stanthorpe
- 10091 Bandaisan
- 10094 Eijikato
- 10167 Yoshiwatiso
- 10300 Tanakadate
- 10321 Rampo
- 10547 Yosakoi
- 10791
- 10803 Caléyo
- 10829 Matsuobasho
- 11288 Okunohosomichi
- 11294
- 11296 Denzen
- 11304 Cowra
- 11321 Tosimatumoto
- 11361 Orbinskij
- 11516 Arthurpage
- 11878 Hanamiyama
- 11925
- 11927 Mount Kent
- 12084 Unno
- 12277 Tajimasatonokai
- 12335
- 12690
- 12706 Tanezaki
- 12749
- 13015 Noradokei
- 13529 Yokaboshi
- 13553 Masaakikoyama
- 13569 Oshu
- 13918 Tsukinada
- 13933 Charleville
- 13978 Hiwasa
- 13989 Murikabushi
- 14012 Amedee
- 14880 Moa
- 15238 Hisaohori
- 15252 Yoshiken
- 15723 Girraween
- 15739 Matsukuma
- 16503 Ayato
- 16602 Anabuki
- 17461
- 17465 Inawashiroko
- 17508 Takumadan
- 17509 Ikumadan
- 18365 Shimomoto
- 18400
- 18609 Shinobuyama
- 18644 Arashiyama
- 19156 Heco
- 19161
- 19197 Akasaki
- 19210
- 20040 Tatsuyamatsuyama
- 20102 Takasago
- 21014 Daishi
- 21016 Miyazawaseiroku
- 21022 Ike
- 21089 Mochizuki
- 21126 Katsuyoshi
- 21166 Nobuyukishouji
- 21282 Shimizuyuka
- 23468 Kannabe
- 23478 Chikumagawa
- 23504 Haneda
- 23587 Abukumado
- 24889 Tamurahosinomura
- 26092 Norikonoriyuki
- 26097
- 26123
- 26127 Otakasakajyo
- 26151 Irinokaigan
- 26837 Yoshitakaokazaki
- 27716 Nobuyuki
- 27739 Kimihiro
- 27740 Obatomoyuki
- 27790 Urashimataro
- 29157 Higashinihon
- 29186 Lake Tekapo
- 29199 Himeji
- 29249 Hiraizumi
- 29252 Konjikido
- 29337 Hakurojo
- 30838
- 30879 Hiroshikanai
- 30888 Okitsumisaki
- 32858 Kitakamigawa
- 35076 Yataro
- 35093 Akicity
- 37729 Akiratakao
- 39558 Kishine
- 39566 Carllewis
- 39712 Ehimedaigaku
- 39809 Fukuchan
- 42566 Ryutaro
- 43792
- 43794 Yabetakemoto
- 43803
- 43857
- 46580 Ryouichiirie
- 46592
- 46595 Kita-Kyushu
- 46596 Tobata
- 48482 Oruki
- 48495 Ryugado
- 52285 Kakurinji
- 52455 Masamika
- 58164
- 58184 Masayukiyamamoto
- 58185 Rokkosan
- 65716 Ohkinohama
- 65894 Echizenmisaki
- 79130 Bandanomori
- 79149 Kajigamori
- 79152 Abukumagawa
- 90713 Chajnantor
- 120462 Amanohashidate

=== Jurassien-Vicques Observatory ===
It has discovered the following asteroids:

- 42113 Jura
- 42191 Thurmann
- 46095 Frederickoby
- 57658 Nilrem
- 68718 Safi
- 77755 Delemont
- 84902 Porrentruy
- 88906 Moutier
- 95771 Lachat
- 99824 Polnareff
- 113415 Rauracia
- 115950 Kocherpeter
- 117736 Sherrod
- 125076 Michelmayor
- 126160 Fabienkuntz
- 126748 Mariegerbet
- 128629
- 129078 Animoo
- 129137 Hippolochos
- 143577
- 143622 Robertbloch
- 145456
- 145559
- 145565
- 152190
- 155018
- 162937 Prêtre
- 163380

=== Kingsnake Observatory ===
It has discovered the following asteroids:

- 37390
- 52004
- 64838
- 68570
- 72945
- 83972
- 84618
- 84650
- 84717
- 84722
- 84830
- 90434
- 94771
- 99373
- 114094 Irvpatterson
- 114096 Haroldbier
- 114097
- 114153
- 115431
- 115490
- 115491
- 116143
- 125524
- 126444 Wylie
- 126445 Prestonreeves
- 127929
- 128266
- 131701
- 133558
- 135515
- 141397
- 141398
- 149924
- 151197
- 156372
- 156703
- 157072
- 159167
- 160956
- 163958
- 164185
- 402070
- 405304
- 405305
- 416546
- 430523
- 443992
- 506466
- 524818
- 612324
- 641094

=== Kitami Observatory ===
Kitami Observatory has discovered the following asteroids:

- 5356 Neagari
- 5357 Sekiguchi
- 7773 Kyokuchiken
- 10092 Sasaki
- 10117 Tanikawa
- 10138 Ohtanihiroshi
- 10146 Mukaitadashi
- 10155 Numaguti
- 10182 Junkobiwaki
- 10301 Kataoka
- 10304 Iwaki
- 10319 Toshiharu
- 10322 Mayuminarita
- 10326 Kuragano
- 10351 Seiichisato
- 10352 Kawamura
- 10355 Kojiroharada
- 10366 Shozosato
- 10546 Nakanomakoto
- 10555 Tagaharue
- 10559 Yukihisa
- 10560 Michinari
- 10561 Shimizumasahiro
- 10569 Kinoshitamasao
- 10570 Shibayasuo
- 10608 Mameta
- 10616 Inouetakeshi
- 10760 Ozeki
- 10767 Toyomasu
- 10802 Masamifuruya
- 10805 Iwano
- 10821 Kimuratakeshi
- 10822 Yasunori
- 10823 Sakaguchi
- 10827 Doikazunori
- 10873
- 10882 Shinonaga
- 10884 Tsuboimasaki
- 10885 Horimasato
- 11072 Hiraoka
- 11074 Kuniwake
- 11079 Mitsunori
- 11086 Nagatayuji
- 11087 Yamasakimakoto
- 11099 Sonodamasaki
- 11280 Sakurai
- 11282 Hanakusa
- 11316 Fuchitatsuo
- 11323 Nasu
- 11324 Hayamizu
- 11492 Shimose
- 11494 Hibiki
- 11495 Fukunaga
- 11545 Hashimoto
- 11546 Miyoshimachi
- 11579 Tsujitsuka
- 11593 Uchikawa
- 11615 Naoya
- 11664 Kashiwagi
- 11860 Uedasatoshi
- 11915 Nishiinoue
- 11921 Mitamasahiro
- 11928 Akimotohiro
- 11929 Uchino
- 11933 Himuka
- 11949 Kagayayutaka
- 11959 Okunokeno
- 11978 Makotomasako
- 11987 Yonematsu
- 12012 Kitahiroshima
- 12013 Sibatahosimi
- 12047 Hideomitani
- 12262 Nishio
- 12278 Kisohinoki
- 12326 Shirasaki
- 12357 Toyako
- 12362 Mumuryk
- 12383 Eboshi
- 12387 Tomokofujiwara
- 12388 Kikunokai
- 12391 Ecoadachi
- 12411 Tannokayo
- 12412 Muchisachie
- 12415 Wakatatakayo
- 12435 Sudachi
- 12440 Koshigayaboshi
- 12734 Haruna
- 12746 Yumeginga
- 12751 Kamihayashi
- 12769 Kandakurenai
- 12771 Kimshin
- 12787 Abetadashi
- 12810 Okumiomote
- 13039 Awashima
- 13094 Shinshuueda
- 13140 Shinchukai
- 13156 Mannoucyo
- 13163 Koyamachuya
- 13198 Banpeiyu
- 13540 Kazukitakahashi
- 13561 Kudogou
- 13564 Kodomomiraikan
- 13565 Yotakanashi
- 13567 Urabe
- 13576 Gotoyoshi
- 13577 Ukawa
- 13582 Tominari
- 13605 Nakamuraminoru
- 13608 Andosatoru
- 13627 Yukitamayo
- 13640 Ohtateruaki
- 13942 Shiratakihime
- 14004 Chikama
- 14006 Sakamotofumio
- 14010 Jomonaomori
- 14027
- 14028 Nakamurahiroshi
- 14031 Rozyo
- 14047 Kohichiro
- 14105 Nakadai
- 14401 Reikoyukawa
- 14426 Katotsuyoshi
- 14436 Morishita
- 14441 Atakanoseki
- 14443 Sekinenomatsu
- 14445 Koichi
- 14447 Hosakakanai
- 14449 Myogizinzya
- 14469 Komatsuataka
- 14487 Sakaisakae
- 14491 Hitachiomiya
- 14492 Bistar
- 14499 Satotoshio
- 14555 Shinohara
- 14850 Nagashimacho
- 14853 Shimokawa
- 14888 Kanazawashi
- 14901 Hidatakayama
- 14911 Fukamatsu
- 14922 Ohyama
- 14925 Naoko
- 14926 Hoshide
- 14927 Satoshi
- 14981 Uenoiwakura
- 14998 Ogosemachi
- 15246 Kumeta
- 15248 Hidekazu
- 15250 Nishiyamahiro
- 15303 Hatoyamamachi
- 15316 Okagakimachi
- 15330
- 15351 Yamaguchimamoru
- 15716 Narahara
- 15729 Yumikoitahana
- 15736 Hamanasu
- 15740 Hyakumangoku
- 15763
- 15786
- 15791
- 15805 Murakamitakehiko
- 15806 Kohei
- 15821 Iijimatatsushi
- 15843 Comcom
- 15856 Yanokoji
- 15857 Touji
- 15910 Shinkamigoto
- 15922 Masajisaito
- 16439 Yamehoshinokawa
- 16449 Kigoyama
- 16463 Nayoro
- 16466 Piyashiriyama
- 16507 Fuuren
- 16525 Shumarinaiko
- 16528 Terakado
- 16552 Sawamura
- 16555 Nagaomasami
- 16587 Nagamori
- 16594 Sorachi
- 16624 Hoshizawa
- 16625 Kunitsugu
- 16644 Otemaedaigaku
- 16649
- 16650 Sakushingakuin
- 16671 Tago
- 16675 Torii
- 16680 Minamitanemachi
- 16713
- 16718 Morikawa
- 16719 Mizokami
- 17462 Takahisa
- 17470 Mitsuhashi
- 17501 Tetsuro
- 17502 Manabeseiji
- 17516 Kogayukihito
- 17520 Hisayukiyoshio
- 17544 Kojiroishikawa
- 17546 Osadakentaro
- 17567 Hoshinoyakata
- 17603 Qoyllurwasi
- 17615 Takeomasaru
- 17617 Takimotoikuo
- 18399 Tentoumushi
- 18403 Atsuhirotaisei
- 18404 Kenichi
- 18418 Ujibe
- 18453 Nishiyamayukio
- 18472 Hatada
- 18473 Kikuchijun
- 18524 Tagatoshihiro
- 19135 Takashionaka
- 19159 Taenakano
- 19160 Chikayoshitomi
- 19165 Nariyuki
- 19228 Uemuraikuo
- 19230 Sugazi
- 19288 Egami
- 19303 Chinacyo
- 19304
- 19307 Hanayama
- 19313 Shibatakazunari
- 19314 Nakamuratetsu
- 19315
- 20019 Yukiotanaka
- 20038 Arasaki
- 20080 Maeharatorakichi
- 20096 Shiraishiakihiko
- 20098 Shibatagenji
- 20117 Tannoakira
- 21015
- 21033 Akahirakiyozo
- 21035 Iwabu
- 21117 Tashimaseizo
- 21120
- 21121
- 21161 Yamashitaharuo
- 21182
- 21187 Setsuo
- 21188
- 21237 Suematsu
- 21280
- 21292
- 21293
- 21294
- 22346 Katsumatatakashi
- 22347 Mishinatakashi
- 22351
- 22352
- 22355 Yahabananshozan
- 22394 Kondouakira
- 22395 Ourakenji
- 22397
- 22409
- 22416
- 22443
- 22453
- 22480
- 23465
- 23471
- 23475
- 23495
- 23524
- 23543
- 23562
- 23662
- 23676
- 24673
- 24726
- 24753
- 24757
- 24808
- 24816
- 24825
- 24830
- 24841
- 24844
- 24911 Kojimashigemi
- 24919 Teruyoshi
- 24960
- 26104
- 26171
- 26213
- 26828
- 26852
- 26855
- 26886
- 27749
- 27787
- 27809
- 27815
- 27816
- 27844
- 27861
- 27882
- 27887
- 27920
- 29159
- 29167
- 29251
- 29299
- 29374 Kazumitsu
- 29408
- 29474
- 30805
- 30886
- 30924
- 30925
- 30943
- 30944
- 31063
- 32815
- 32854
- 32909
- 32919
- 32973
- 33008
- 33059
- 35141
- 35143
- 35169
- 35170
- 35171
- 35172
- 35231
- 35298
- 35299
- 35343
- 37565
- 37625
- 37626
- 37669
- 37693
- 37764
- 39703
- 39723
- 42527
- 43851
- 43870
- 43899
- 43926
- 43935
- 46588
- 46589
- 46590
- 46608
- 46609
- 46610 Bésixdouze
- 46631
- 46634
- 46649
- 48433
- 48448
- 48590
- 48591
- 48635
- 48680
- 48686
- 48739
- 48748
- 48802

=== Lime Creek Observatory ===
Private observatory of Robert Linderholm (1933–2013); it discovered the following asteroids:

- 10195 Nebraska
- 10392 Brace
- 11726 Edgerton
- 14969 Willacather
- 16750 Marisandoz
- 19294 Weymouth
- 20328
- 23763
- 24918 Tedkooser
- 27909
- 28005
- 29518
- 31054
- 33051
- 46670
- 48702
- 49109 Agnesraab
- 52688
- 53008
- 66846 Franklederer
- 70721
- 75057
- 91598
- 129539

=== Mount Nyukasa Station ===
It has discovered the following asteroids:

- 6416 Nyukasayama
- 6499 Michiko
- 6918 Manaslu
- 7028 Tachikawa
- 7067 Kiyose
- 7353 Kazuya
- 7891 Fuchie
- 7892 Musamurahigashi
- 8100 Nobeyama
- 8200 Souten
- 8530 Korbokkur
- 8551 Daitarabochi
- 8702 Nakanishi
- 9197 Endo
- 9350 Waseda
- 9386 Hitomi
- 10171 Takaotengu
- 10617 Takumi
- 10837 Yuyakekoyake
- 13162 Ryokkochigaku
- 14036 Yasuhirotoyama
- 14037
- 14425 Fujimimachi
- 14495
- 14999
- 15336
- 15352
- 15797
- 15798
- 15833
- 15919
- 16704
- 18457
- 19246
- 19254
- 20114
- 22385 Fujimoriboshi
- 23591
- 26982
- 27826
- 27827 Ukai
- 28223
- 29342
- 30962
- 30968
- 32914
- 35371 Yokonozaki
- 37675
- 39612
- 39659
- 42599
- 58284
- 95165
- 143046
- 143047
- 164473
- 164538
- 170074
- 185447
- 187531 Omorichugakkou
- 187594
- 187595
- 187618
- 188900
- 188901
- 192160
- 199287
- 402546
- 402751
- 402758
- 406062
- 410050
- 423710
- 431286
- 431287
- 431346
- 434684
- 434764
- 438332
- 440715
- 457098
- 470547
- 475375
- 481471
- 489429
- 545118
- 552897
- 555624
- 563060
- 573206
- 580719
- 587123
- 587591
- 589966
- 597411
- 602568
- 611792
- 611793
- 613698
- 624417
- 627569
- 632287
- 632919
- 643320
- 644951
- 645176
- 682781
- 692345

=== Nanyo Observatory ===
Nanyo Civil Astronomical Observatory was established in 1986 by the Nanyo Astronomical Lovers Club, located in Nan'yō, Yamagata, Japan. This astronomy society was founded in 1983.

It has discovered the following asteroids:

- 7039 Yamagata
- 8220 Nanyou
- 8418 Mogamigawa
- 8723 Azumayama
- 8730 Iidesan
- 8747 Asahi
- 8922 Kumanodake
- 8937 Gassan
- 9110 Choukai
- 9128 Takatumuzi
- 9990 Niiyaeki
- 10405 Yoshiaki
- 10583 Kanetugu
- 10864 Yamagatashi
- 10886 Mitsuroohba
- 11119 Taro
- 11623 Kagekatu
- 11752 Masatakesagai
- 12003 Hideosugai
- 12400 Katumaru
- 12439 Okasaki
- 12445 Sirataka
- 12478 Suzukiseiji
- 12788 Shigeno
- 12793 Hosinokokai
- 13146 Yuriko
- 13199
- 13220 Kashiwagura
- 13222 Ichikawakazuo
- 13224 Takamatsuda
- 13235 Isiguroyuki
- 13365 Tenzinyama
- 13624 Abeosamu
- 13678 Shimada
- 13679 Shinanogawa
- 13686 Kongozan
- 13787 Nagaishi
- 14046 Keikai
- 14515 Koichisato
- 14551 Itagaki
- 14962 Masanoriabe
- 14963 Toshikazu
- 15028 Soushiyou
- 15387 Hanazukayama
- 15840 Hiroshiendou
- 15906 Yoshikaneda
- 16261 Iidemachi
- 16725 Toudono
- 16736 Tongariyama
- 16764
- 17629 Koichisuzuki
- 17645 Inarimori
- 17685
- 17948
- 18461 Seiichikanno
- 18818 Yasuhiko
- 18840 Yoshioba
- 19392 Oyamada
- 19707 Tokunai
- 20107 Nanyotenmondai
- 20115 Niheihajime
- 20204 Yuudurunosato
- 21275 Tosiyasu
- 21368 Shiodayama
- 21460 Ryozo
- 22490 Zigamiyama
- 23727 Akihasan
- 24910 Haruoando
- 24940 Sankichiyama
- 24965 Akayu
- 26319 Miyauchi
- 26919 Shoichimiyata
- 27879 Shibata
- 27955 Yasumasa
- 29355 Siratakayama
- 29362 Azumakofuzi
- 29373 Hamanowa
- 29394 Hirokohamanowa
- 29404 Hikarusato
- 29450 Tomohiroohno
- 29905 Kunitaka
- 31105 Oguniyamagata
- 31152 Daishinsai
- 32969 Motohikosato
- 33056 Ogunimachi
- 33553 Nagai
- 35265 Takeosaitou
- 35274 Kenziarino
- 37720 Kawanishi
- 39655 Muneharuasada
- 39679 Nukuhiyama,
- 39686 Takeshihara,
- 39726 Hideyukitezuka,
- 40774 Iwaigame
- 43889 Osawatakaomi
- 43908 Hiraku
- 43931 Yoshimi
- 43998 Nanyoshino
- 44011 Juubichi
- 44013 Iidetenmomdai
- 46689 Hakuryuko
- 46727 Hidekimatsuyama
- 46796 Mamigasakigawa
- 48607 Yamagatatemodai
- 48624 Sadayuki
- 48756
- 48807 Takahata
- 54288 Daikikawasaki
- 58569 Eboshiyamakouen
- 58600 Iwamuroonsen
- 58618
- 65784 Naderayama
- 65869
- 69496 Zaoryuzan
- 73819 Isaootuki
- 73857 Hitaneichi
- 85388
- 85400 Shiratakachu
- 85401 Yamatenclub
- 90838
- 90953 Hideosaitou
- 96348 Toshiyukimariko
- 100433 Hyakusyuko
- 100463
- 129541
- 129544
- 129550 Fukuten
- 129596
- 175710

=== Oaxaca Observatory ===
Oaxaca Observatory has discovered the following asteroids:

- 14217 Oaxaca
- 15115 Yvonneroe
- 15964 Billgray
- 15965 Robertcox
- 16191 Rubyroe
- 17823 Bartels
- 18024 Dobson
- 18876 Sooner
- 23081
- 24173 SLAS
- 24315
- 25331 Berrevoets
- 25388
- 27340
- 28514
- 29524
- 30014
- 30103
- 31444
- 31604
- 41687
- 41941
- 42608
- 43016
- 43017
- 43483
- 45071
- 49701
- 50417
- 53160
- 56280 Asemo
- 59420
- 64622
- 66843 Pulido
- 67200
- 67205
- 68018
- 70957
- 72323
- 72546
- 72928
- 75306
- 77037
- 77059
- 80010
- 80451 Alwoods
- 94195
- 94213
- 95460
- 96712
- 97504
- 98972
- 99392
- 102593
- 103017
- 103639
- 103781
- 104031
- 106836
- 106844
- 107213
- 107311
- 119634
- 131153
- 131236
- 131699
- 134936
- 137874
- 138818
- 141340
- 141358
- 146874
- 158425
- 159428
- 160932
- 165993
- 166084
- 168634
- 173551
- 175858
- 176499
- 182002
- 182234
- 189619
- 190670
- 190995
- 194731
- 200886
- 203470
- 215217
- 219480
- 219776
- 230356
- 234631
- 269990
- 297484
- 306717
- 313141
- 337319
- 380289
- 382471
- 480853

=== Osservatorio Astronomico di Monte Agliale ===
It has discovered the following asteroids:

- 15497 Lucca
- 21891 Andreabocelli
- 22903 Georgeclooney
- 27184 Ciabattari
- 29829 Engels
- 29907
- 33360
- 36061 Haldane
- 36182 Montigiani
- 38247
- 40254
- 41056
- 44717 Borgoamozzano
- 47162 Chicomendez
- 49469 Emilianomazzoni
- 49481 Gisellarubini
- 59388 Monod
- 59390 Habermas
- 60183 Falcone
- 62744
- 66938
- 69977 Saurodonati
- 70418 Kholopov
- 79900 Coreglia
- 91257
- 96623 Leani
- 96764
- 96879
- 101588
- 101753
- 103966 Luni
- 121646
- 122632
- 129743
- 129880
- 134510
- 137063
- 137303
- 137633
- 160604

=== Osservatorio Astronomico di Pianoro ===
It has discovered the following asteroids:

- 9232 Miretti
- 10197 Senigalliesi
- 10200 Quadri
- 11121 Malpighi
- 12035 Ruggieri
- 15381 Spadolini
- 16761 Hertz
- 16766 Righi
- 17652 Nepoti
- 21306 Marani
- 25276 Dimai
- 26917 Pianoro
- 29457 Marcopolo
- 33376 Medi
- 39699 Ernestocorte
- 42747 Fuser
- 42748 Andrisani
- 43999 Gramigna
- 44005 Migliardi
- 47038 Majoni
- 48737 Cusinato
- 58573 Serpieri
- 70745 Aleserpieri
- 79375 Valetti
- 79826 Finardi
- 100553 Dariofo

=== Osservatorio Astronomico Sormano ===
The Sormano Astronomical Observatory in northern Italy has discovered the asteroid 344581 Albisetti. Previously accredited discoveries have now been reassigned to the various amateur astronomers using the observatory. These include Valter Giuliani, Piero Sicoli, Pierangelo Ghezzi, Francesco Manca, Paolo Chiavenna, Graziano Ventre and Augusto Testa.

Marco Cavagna, was also an observer and discoverer of minor planets at Sormano until his death in 2005. The observatory's 0.5-meter telescope was named in his honor.

=== Osservatorio Colleverde di Guidonia ===
It has discovered the following asteroids:

- 6339 Giliberti
- 6530 Adry
- 6877 Giada
- 6929 Misto
- 7529 Vagnozzi
- 7600 Vacchi
- 7665 Putignano
- 7961 Ercolepoli
- 8569 Mameli
- 8716 Ginestra
- 8742 Bonazzoli
- 9121 Stefanovalentini
- 10386 Romulus
- 11142 Facchini
- 11328 Mariotozzi
- 11578 Cimabue
- 12384 Luigimartella
- 13197 Pontecorvo
- 13653 Priscus
- 13684 Borbona
- 14088 Ancus
- 14498 Bernini
- 15007 Edoardopozio
- 15353 Meucci
- 15854 Numa
- 15869 Tullius
- 16770 Angkorwat
- 17556 Pierofrancesca
- 17649 Brunorossi
- 18169 Amaldi
- 18509 Bellini
- 18596 Superbus
- 21219 Mascagni
- 21311 Servius
- 23564 Ungaretti
- 24826 Pascoli
- 24946 Foscolo
- 25312 Asiapossenti
- 29347 Natta
- 29361 Botticelli
- 29428 Ettoremajorana
- 29449 Taharbenjelloun
- 29470 Higgs
- 31319
- 31429 Diegoazzaro
- 32891 Amatrice
- 32911 Cervara
- 32945 Lecce
- 32987 Uyuni
- 33002 Everest
- 35295 Omo
- 37627 Lucaparmitano
- 37640 Luiginegrelli
- 37683 Gustaveeiffel
- 37735 Riccardomuti
- 40134 Marsili
- 42585 Pheidippides
- 43935 Danshechtman
- 44355 Thijsdegraauw
- 48720 Enricomentana
- 50866
- 51915 Andry
- 52558 Pigafetta
- 53843 Antjiekrog
- 56038
- 58417
- 58495
- 58498 Octaviopaz
- 65785 Carlafracci
- 65821 De Curtis
- 69460 Christibarnard
- 69500 Ginobartali
- 73872 Stefanoragazzi
- 73891 Pietromennea
- 75225 Corradoaugias
- 83657 Albertosordi
- 85267 Taj Mahal
- 85578
- 90806 Rudaki
- 100292 Harmandir
- 100445
- 100456
- 100731 Ara Pacis
- 120575
- 129555 Armazones
- 134369 Sahara
- 145962 Lacchini
- 160105 Gobi
- 243591 Ignacostantino
- 267017 Yangzhifa

=== Rand Observatory ===
It has discovered the following asteroids:

- 10194
- 10895 Aynrand
- 14075 Kenwill
- 14093
- 14529
- 14531
- 14983
- 17638 Sualan
- 17642
- 18502
- 27950
- 29454
- 31125
- 32962
- 32963
- 32966
- 35279
- 35283 Bradtimerson
- 44004
- 52594
- 52598
- 52607
- 65866
- 69549
- 85482
- 100459
- 101506
- 120714
- 160529
- 192416
- 221983
- 267036

=== Rozhen National Astronomical Observatory ===
The Rozhen Observatory has discovered the following asteroids:

- 3546 Atanasoff
- 3860 Plovdiv
- 3903 Kliment Ohridski
- 3952 Russellmark
- 4102 Gergana
- 4400 Bagryana
- 4486 Mithra
- 4628 Laplace
- 4891 Blaga
- 4893 Seitter
- 5002 Marnix
- 5950 Leukippos
- 6123 Aristoteles
- 6267 Rozhen
- 11852 Shoumen
- 11856 Nicolabonev
- 13930 Tashko

=== Sendai Astronomical Observatory ===
It has discovered the following asteroids:

- 7666 Keyaki
- 7816 Hanoi
- 8084 Dallas
- 11127 Hagi

=== Sunflower Observatory ===
It has discovered the following asteroids:

- 18984 Olathe
- 19019 Sunflower
- 19857 Amandajane
- 20517 Judycrystal
- 24162 Askaci
- 25890 Louisburg
- 36445 Smalley
- 41279 Trentman
- 41943 Fredrick

=== Tenagra II Observatory ===
It has discovered the following asteroids:

- 48047 Houghten
- 51430 Ireneclaire
- 65213
- 72993
- 77971
- 107379
- 107396
- 107397
- 107398
- 107559
- 107560
- 108324
- 113967
- 113974
- 115775
- 116192
- 116651
- 126950
- 128026
- 131186 Pauluckas
- 131187
- 131193
- 131221
- 132280
- 149307
- 149968 Trondal
- 151875
- 151885
- 155142 Tenagra
- 157456 Pivatte
- 157747 Mandryka
- 159717
- 159853
- 161299
- 163226
- 163630
- 163731
- 163733
- 400726
- 403549
- 409134
- 411200
- 416477
- 430688
- 434678 Curlin
- 436343
- 436352
- 438955
- 519108
- 541292
- 549382
- 591324
- 612755
- 614654
- 648853
- 668634

=== Tzec Maun Observatory (Mayhill) ===
It has discovered the following asteroids:

- 207901 Tzecmaun
- 216433 Milianleo
- 216439 Lyubertsy
- 228165 Mezentsev
- 229899
- 231649 Korotkiy
- 233925
- 239664
- 241418 Darmstadt
- 249452
- 257261 Ovechkin
- 263932 Speyer
- 264020 Stuttgart
- 264061 Vitebsk
- 264156
- 266836
- 269390 Igortkachenko
- 269447
- 269567 Bakhtinov
- 269568
- 269589 Kryachko
- 274835 Aachen
- 274981 Petrsu
- 279037 Utezimmer
- 279274 Shurpakov
- 279340
- 281661
- 281811
- 281825
- 283117 Bonn
- 296345
- 296505
- 296530
- 296563
- 296747
- 296818
- 296866
- 296881
- 301061 Egelsbach
- 301221
- 301394 Bensheim
- 301522
- 305754
- 312561
- 316042 Tilofranz
- 316056
- 325558 Guyane
- 328472
- 328477 Eckstein
- 328704
- 328734
- 328791
- 328830
- 331056
- 332633
- 336698 Melbourne
- 342277
- 343138
- 343251
- 343323
- 352945
- 355924
- 356157
- 356261
- 359243
- 362241
- 365243
- 365758
- 367605
- 367864
- 369400
- 372562
- 376084 Annettepeter
- 378917 Stefankarge
- 379155 Volkerheinrich
- 379283
- 384045
- 389293 Hasubick
- 398042
- 400674
- 400697
- 400729
- 407154
- 407228
- 407231
- 410769
- 410965
- 410983
- 411144
- 414585
- 419285
- 419366
- 419730
- 509923
- 529432
- 530100
- 544417
- 557620
- 574016
- 574036
- 574108
- 576436
- 589396
- 589808
- 591420
- 591421
- 599010
- 599208
- 614137
- 632834
- 633278
- 633525
- 633770
- 665585
- 665799
- 684827
- 687004

=== Uenohara Observatory ===
It has discovered the following asteroids:

- 4381 Uenohara
- 4749 Ledzeppelin
- (5336) 1991 JE1
- (5525) 1991 TS4
- (5752) 1992 CJ
- (5874) 1989 XB
- (5882) 1992 WW5
- (6409) 1992 VC
- 7427
- 7471
- 7836
- 7877
- 7878
- 8093
- 8854
- (9989) 1997 SG16
- 11543
- 11894
- 11920
- 12330
- 12331
- 12332
- 12361
- 13135
- 13568
- 13799
- 14043
- 14430
- 14642
- 14978
- 15479
- 15480
- 16805
- 16808
- 16890
- 17495
- 24957
- 25277
- 25285
- 25473
- 25753
- 26975
- 28268
- 29726
- 32857
- 44932
- 44955
- 46732
- 47079
- 47339
- 48839
- 52659
- 53091
- 53148
- 53548
- 56101
- 59214
- 60407
- 63164
- 66191
- 66209
- 69840
- 70778
- 71003
- 74344
- 74404
- 74442
- 79352
- 80700
- 85858
- 100513
- 101459
- 118250
- 118289
- 121664
- 129725
- 134654
- 134748
- 136829
- 137919
- 145837
- 145844
- 146008
- 168445
- 168472
- 186099
- 192433
- 202941
- 257753

=== Uto Observatory ===
It has discovered the following asteroids:

- 1282 Utopia
- 7253 Nara
- 7895 Kaseda
- 8041 Masumoto
- 9648 Gotouhideo
- 12844
- 14931
- 18489
- 19309
- 21810
- 22904
- 22976
- 24756
- 25296
- 27182
- 35254
- 44487
- 49442
- 49497
- 49707
- 56097
- 59834
- 100327

=== Yatsugatake-Kobuchizawa ===
It has discovered the following asteroids:

- 4033 Yatsugatake
- 4458 Oizumi
- 4577 Chikako
- 4640 Hara
- 4875 Ingalls
- 5239 Reiki
- 5352 Fujita
- 5403 Takachiho
- 5405 Neverland
- 5473 Yamanashi
- 5489 Oberkochen
- 5687 Yamamotoshinobu
- 6308 Ebisuzaki
- 6395 Hilliard
- 6405 Komiyama
- 6464 Kaburaki
- 6612 Hachioji
- 6643 Morikubo
- 6667 Sannaimura
- 6731 Hiei
- 6865 Dunkerley
- 6868 Seiyauyeda
- (6915) 1992 HH
- 7068 Minowa
- 7421 Kusaka
- 7575 Kimuraseiji
- 7765
- 7775 Taiko
- 7821
- 7830 Akihikotago
- 8532
- 8691 Etsuko
- 8830
- 8876
- 9190 Masako
- 9335
- 9746 Kazukoichikawa
- 9844 Otani
- 10144
- 10566 Zabadak
- 11513
- 11528 Mie
- 12337
- 12342 Kudohmichiko
- 12691
- 12735
- 14902 Miyairi
- 15269
- 15350 Naganuma
- 15764
- 16599 Shorland
- 17558
- 17563 Tsuneyoshi
- 20042
- 26829 Sakaihoikuen
- 27748 Vivianhoette
- 27791 Masaru
- 48594
- 162011 Konnohmaru

=== Yorii Observatory ===
At Yorii Observatory, Japanese amateur astronomers Masaru Arai and Hiroshi Mori have discovered 45 minor planets (credited by the MPC as per 2016):Scr

- 3823 Yorii
- 3996 Fugaku
- (4262) 1989 CO
- 4291 Kodaihasu
- 4495 Dassanowsky
- 4901 Ó Briain
- (5732) 1988 WC
- (5746) 1991 CK
- (5913) 1990 BU
- 6299 Reizoutoyoko
- (6325) 1991 EA1
- 6380 Gardel
- (6638) 1989 CA
- (6703) 1988 CH
- (6704) 1988 CJ
- 6709 Hiromiyuki
- (6823) 1988 ED1
- (6900) 1988 XD1
- 7409
- 7417
- 7522
- 7570
- 7576
- 7643
- 8484
- 8506
- (9952) 1991 AK
- 10776 Musashitomiyo
- 11038
- 11515 Oshijyo
- 12255
- 13017 Owakenoomi
- 15737
- 16431
- 16432
- 16526
- 19979
- 20001
- 21017
- 23479
- 39537
- 43773
- 48436
- 52269
- 65677

=== Zeno Observatory ===
Tom Stafford discovered a number of asteroids since 1997, including 12061 Alena, 12533 Edmond, 13436 Enid, 13688 Oklahoma, at Zeno Observatory (observatory code 727) in Edmond, Oklahoma.

It has discovered the following asteroids:

- 840 Zenobia
- 6186 Zenon
- 12061 Alena
- 12533 Edmond
- 13324
- 13436 Enid
- 13688 Oklahoma
- 14165
- 15162
- 15904 Halstead
- 16820
- 18033
- 19632
- 22825
- 23201
- 24095
- 24107
- 25357
- 27085
- 27219
- 29822
- 31246
- 33431
- 39808
- 39842
- 40171
- 44474
- 44478
- 44886
- 44903
- 47030
- 49297
- 58584
- 65889
- 68009
- 70426
- 70733
- 74791
- 80249
- 91906
- 100640
- 103576

== See also ==
- List of minor planets § Main index
- List of observatory codes
- List of minor planet discoverers § Discovering dedicated institutions
- Asteroid impact prediction § Surveys
- List of near-Earth object observation projects
