= Saheki (crater) =

- Alluvial fan in Saheki Crater, as seen by HiRISE
- Planet: Mars
- Coordinates: 21.75°S 286.97°W
- Quadrangle: Iapygia
- Diameter: 82.44 km
- Eponym: Tsuneo Saheki, a Japanese amateur astronomer (1916–1996)

Saheki is a crater on Mars, located in the Iapygia quadrangle at 21.75° S and 286.97° W. It measures approximately 82 kilometers in diameter and was named after Tsuneo Saheki, a Japanese amateur astronomer (1916–1996). The naming was adopted by IAU's Working Group for Planetary System Nomenclature in 2006.

The crater contains a number of alluvial fans, which are preserved in inverted relief.

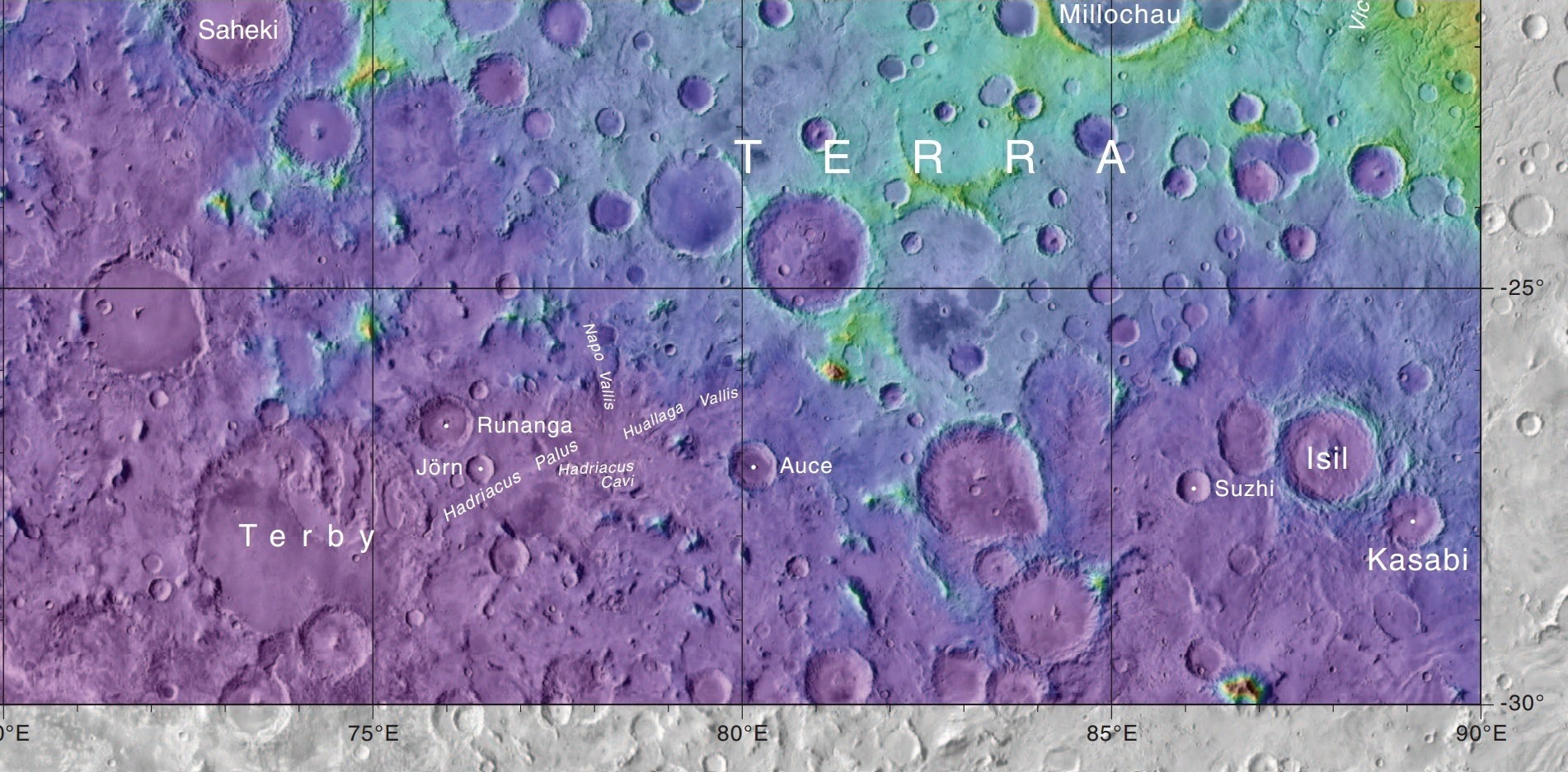
MOLA map showing Saheki Crater and nearby craters. Colors indicate elevations.

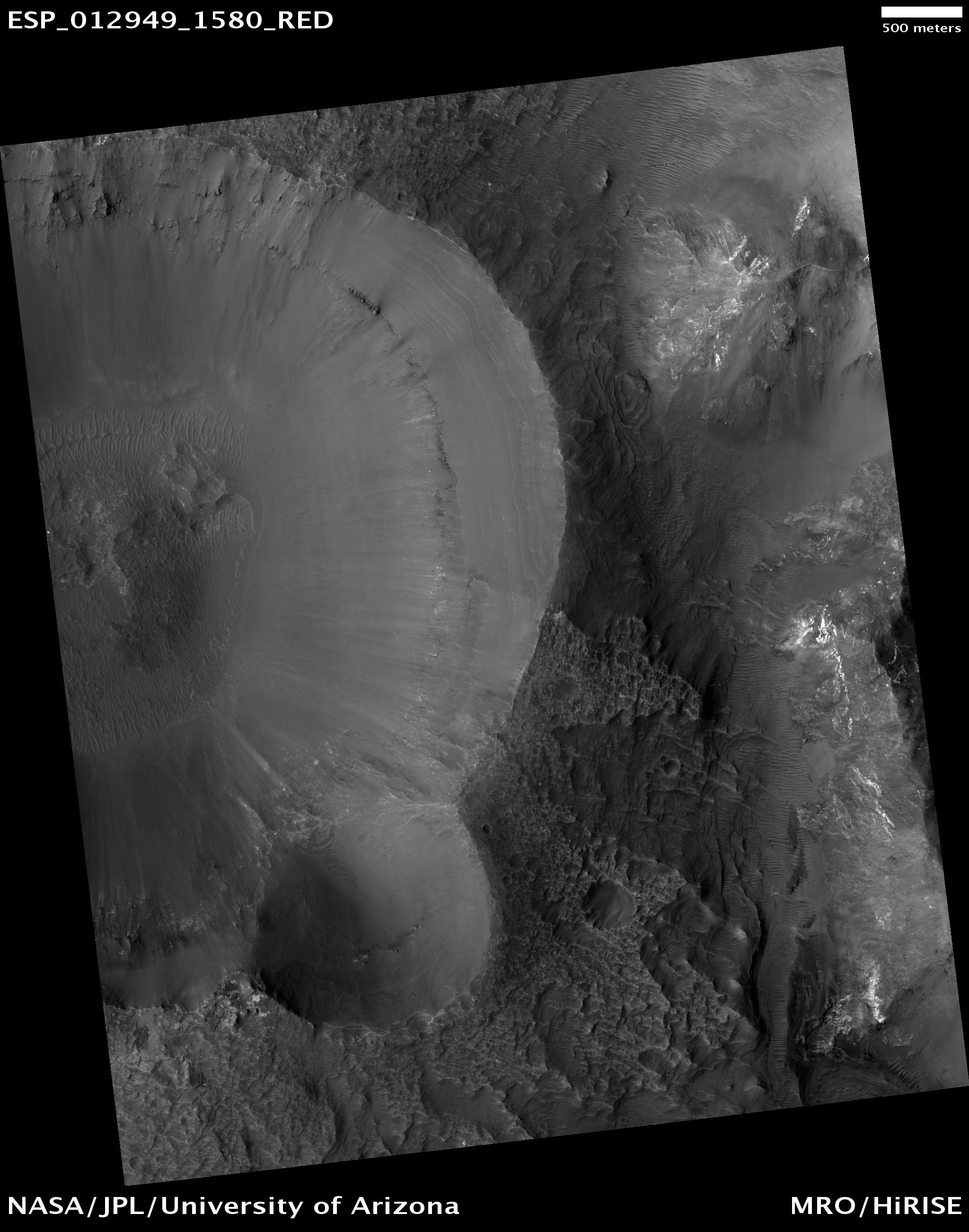
A smaller crater inset within Saheki Crater, as seen by HiRISE.

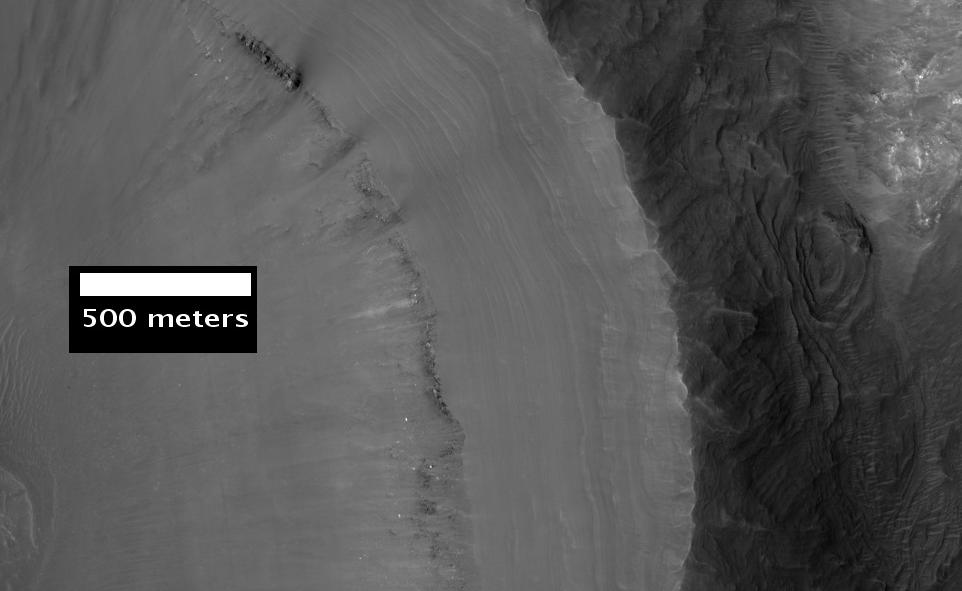
Close-up of Saheki Crater layers, as seen by HiRISE.

== See also ==
- 4606 Saheki, minor planet
- Climate of Mars
- Geology of Mars
- List of craters on Mars
- Ore resources on Mars
- Planetary nomenclature
