= 4606 Saheki =

Main belt asteroid

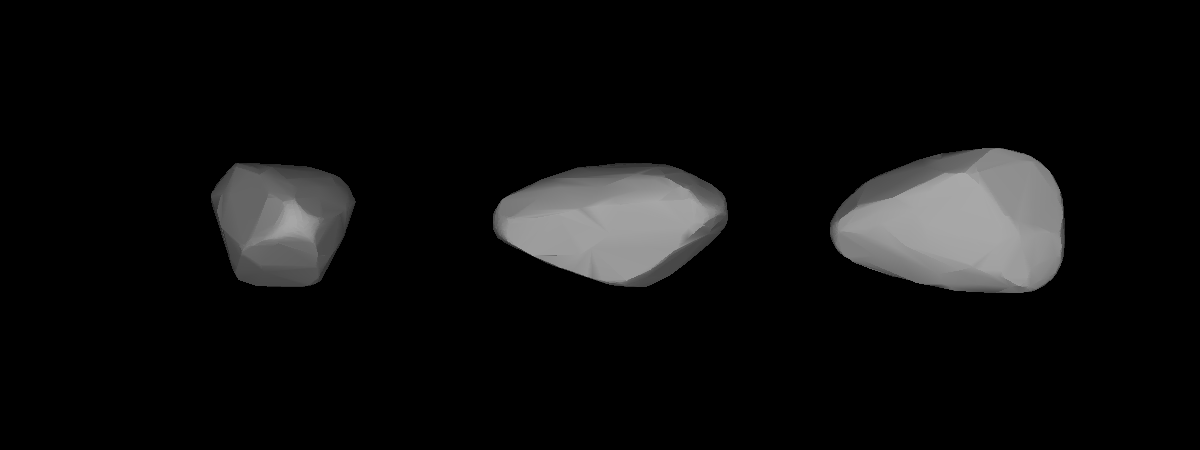
- Lightcurve-based 3D-model of Saheki

Discovery
- Discovered by: T. Seki
- Discovery site: Geisei Obs.
- Discovery date: 27 October 1987

Designations
- Named after: Tsuneo Saheki (astronomer)
- Alternative designations: 1987 UM_{1} · 1972 GA_{1} 1977 TJ_{7} · 1977 VF_{2} 1982 FH_{4}
- Minor planet category: main-belt · Flora

Orbital characteristics
- Epoch 4 September 2017 (JD 2458000.5)
- Uncertainty parameter 0
- Observation arc: 63.81 yr (23,305 days)
- Aphelion: 2.4805 AU
- Perihelion: 2.0231 AU
- Semi-major axis: 2.2518 AU
- Eccentricity: 0.1016
- Orbital period (sidereal): 3.38 yr (1,234 days)
- Mean anomaly: 202.74°
- Mean motion: 0° 17^{m} 30.12^{s} / day
- Inclination: 2.6338°
- Longitude of ascending node: 241.26°
- Argument of perihelion: 251.92°

Physical characteristics
- Dimensions: 6.655±0.069; 6.712±0.041 km 7.14 km (calculated)
- Synodic rotation period: 4.969±0.003 h (Note: Higgins (2011) web: rotation period 4.969±0.003 hours with a brightness amplitude of 0.56 mag. The Collaborative Asteroid Lightcurve Link assigns a quality code of U=3 to the period solution, which denotes a secure result within the precision given and no ambiguity. Summary figures for (4606) Saheki at Collaborative Asteroid Lightcurve Link (CALL)); 4.97347±0.00005 h 5.032±0.001 h
- Geometric albedo: 0.24 (assumed); 0.3266±0.0245; 0.332±0.088
- Spectral type: S
- Absolute magnitude (H): 12.7 · 13.0 · 13.35±0.32

4606 Saheki, provisional designation 1987 UM_{1}, is a stony Flora asteroid from the inner regions of the asteroid belt, approximately 7 kilometers in diameter.

The asteroid was discovered on 27 October 1987, by Japanese astronomer Tsutomu Seki at Geisei Observatory, Japan. It was later named after Japanese astronomer Tsuneo Saheki.

== Classification and orbit ==
Saheki is a member of the Flora family, one of the largest families of stony asteroids. It orbits the Sun in the inner main-belt at a distance of 2.0–2.5 AU once every 3 years and 5 months (1,234 days). Its orbit has an eccentricity of 0.10 and an inclination of 3° with respect to the ecliptic. The first precovery was taken at Palomar Observatory in 1953, extending the asteroid's observation arc by 34 years prior to its discovery.

== Physical characteristics ==
=== Rotation period ===
In January 2009, a rotational lightcurve of Saheki was obtained from photometric observations by David Higgins at Hunters Hill Observatory, Australia. Lightcurve analysis rendered a well-defined rotation period of 4.969 hours with a brightness variation of 0.56 in magnitude (U=3).

Two months later, in March 2009, a second lightcurve was obtained at the Via Capote Observatory (G69), California. It gave a period of 5.032 and an amplitude of 0.68 in magnitude (U=3-).

=== Spin axis ===
In 2013, an international study modeled a lightcurve with a concurring period of 4.97347 hours and found a spin axis of (44.0°, 59.0°) and (222.0°, 68.0°) in ecliptic coordinates (λ, β), respectively (Q=2).

=== Diameter and albedo ===
According to the survey carried out by the NEOWISE mission of NASA's Wide-field Infrared Survey Explorer, Saheki has a high albedo of 0.33 and a diameter of 6.7 kilometers, while the Collaborative Asteroid Lightcurve Link calculates a diameter of 7.1 kilometers, based on an assumed albedo of 0.24, derived from 8 Flora, the Flora family's namesake and largest member.

== Naming ==
This minor planet was named after Japanese astronomer and president of the Toa Astronomical Society, Tsuneo Saheki (1916–1996). Over half a century, Saheki as gathered large inventory of observational data of the planet Mars. The Martian crater Saheki is also named in his honour. The official naming citation was published by the Minor Planet Center on 28 May 1991 (M.P.C. 18308).
