= 2013 Tucapel =

Main-belt asteroid

Discovery
- Discovered by: University of Chile (National Astronomical Observatory of Chile)
- Discovery site: Cerro El Roble Stn.
- Discovery date: 22 October 1971

Designations
- Named after: Battle of Tucapel
- Alternative designations: 1971 UH_{4} · 1936 PL; 1940 XC · 1942 EP_{1} 1950 TP_{2} · 1969 AT; 1974 MM · 1974 NA; 1974 OJ
- Minor planet category: main-belt · Flora

Orbital characteristics
- Epoch 4 September 2017 (JD 2458000.5)
- Uncertainty parameter 0
- Observation arc: 76.32 yr (27,876 days)
- Aphelion: 2.8074 AU
- Perihelion: 1.7714 AU
- Semi-major axis: 2.2894 AU
- Eccentricity: 0.2263
- Orbital period (sidereal): 3.46 yr (1,265 days)
- Mean anomaly: 130.64°
- Mean motion: 0° 17^{m} 4.2^{s} / day
- Inclination: 7.5036°
- Longitude of ascending node: 96.545°
- Argument of perihelion: 238.12°

Physical characteristics
- Dimensions: 10.61±0.72 km 11.187±0.380 km 11.84 km (calculated); 12.16±0.75 km 12.685±0.065 km
- Synodic rotation period: 9.028±0.008 h
- Geometric albedo: 0.1003±0.0179; 0.110±0.014; 0.24 (assumed); 0.328±0.044
- Spectral type: S
- Absolute magnitude (H): 11.70 · 11.8 · 12.27±0.61 · 12.6

2013 Tucapel, provisional designation 1971 UH_{4}, is an eccentric Florian asteroid from the inner regions of the asteroid belt, approximately 11 kilometers in diameter. It was discovered on 22 October 1971, by the University of Chile's National Astronomical Observatory at Cerro El Roble Astronomical Station. It was named for one of the indigenous Mapuche chiefs.

== Orbit and classification ==
Tucapel is a member of the Flora family, one of the largest groups of stony asteroids. It orbits the Sun in the inner main-belt at a distance of 1.8–2.8 AU once every 3 years and 6 months (1,265 days). Its orbit has an eccentricity of 0.23 and an inclination of 8° with respect to the ecliptic.

It was first observed as 1936 PL at Johannesburg Observatory in 1936. Its first used observation was taken at Turku Observatory in 1942, when it was identified as 1942 EP_{1}, thereby extending the body's observation arc by 29 years prior to its official discovery observation at Cerro El Roble.

== Physical characteristics ==
Tucapel has been characterized as a common S-type asteroid.

=== Rotation period ===
In October 2009, a rotational lightcurve of Tucapel was obtained from photometric observations at the Oakley Southern Sky Observatory (E09) in Australia. Lightcurve analysis gave a well-defined rotation period of 9.028 hours with a brightness variation of 0.34 magnitude (U=3).

=== Diameter and albedo ===
According to the surveys carried out by the Japanese Akari satellite and NASA's Wide-field Infrared Survey Explorer with its subsequent NEOWISE mission, Tucapel measures between 10.61 and 12.685 kilometers in diameter and its surface has an albedo between 0.1003 and 0.328. The Collaborative Asteroid Lightcurve Link assumes an albedo of 0.24 — derived from 8 Flora, the family's largest member and namesake – and calculates a diameter of 11.84 kilometers with an absolute magnitude of 11.8.

== Naming ==
This minor planet was named for one of the brave chiefs of the Mapuche, indigenous inhabitants of south-central Chile and southwestern Argentina, who, with his wife Gualeva, victoriously entered the city of Imperial. He died in 1560, fighting against the colonial Spaniards (also see Arauco War, Battle of Tucapel and Lautaro). The official naming citation was published by the Minor Planet Center on 1 June 1980 (M.P.C. 5359).
