= Geisei, Kōchi =

Geisei 芸西村
- Village
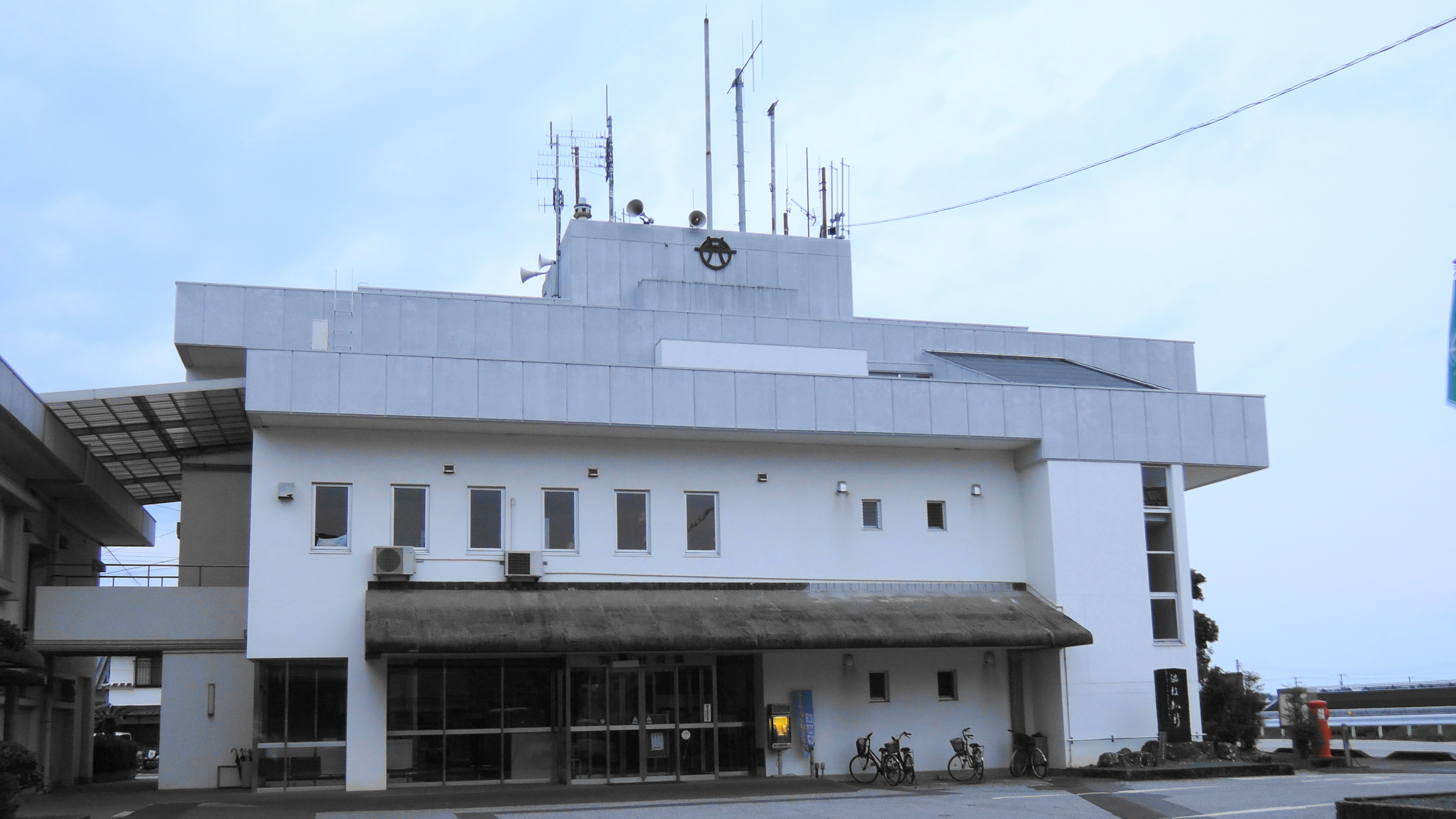
- Geisei village hall

- Flag Chapter
- Interactive map of Geisei
- Location in Japan
- Coordinates: 33°32′N 133°49′E
- Country: Japan
- Region: Shikoku
- Prefecture: Kōchi
- District: Aki

Area
  - Total: 39.60 km^{2} (15.29 sq mi)

Population (June 30, 2022)
  - Total: 3,636
  - Density: 91.82/km^{2} (237.8/sq mi)
- Time zone: UTC+09:00 (JST)
- City hall address: 1262 Wajikiko, Geisei-mura, Aki-gun, Kōchi-ken 781-5701
- Website: Official website
- Symbols
- Bird: Warbling white-eye
- Flower: Rhododendron
- Tree: Pinus thunbergii

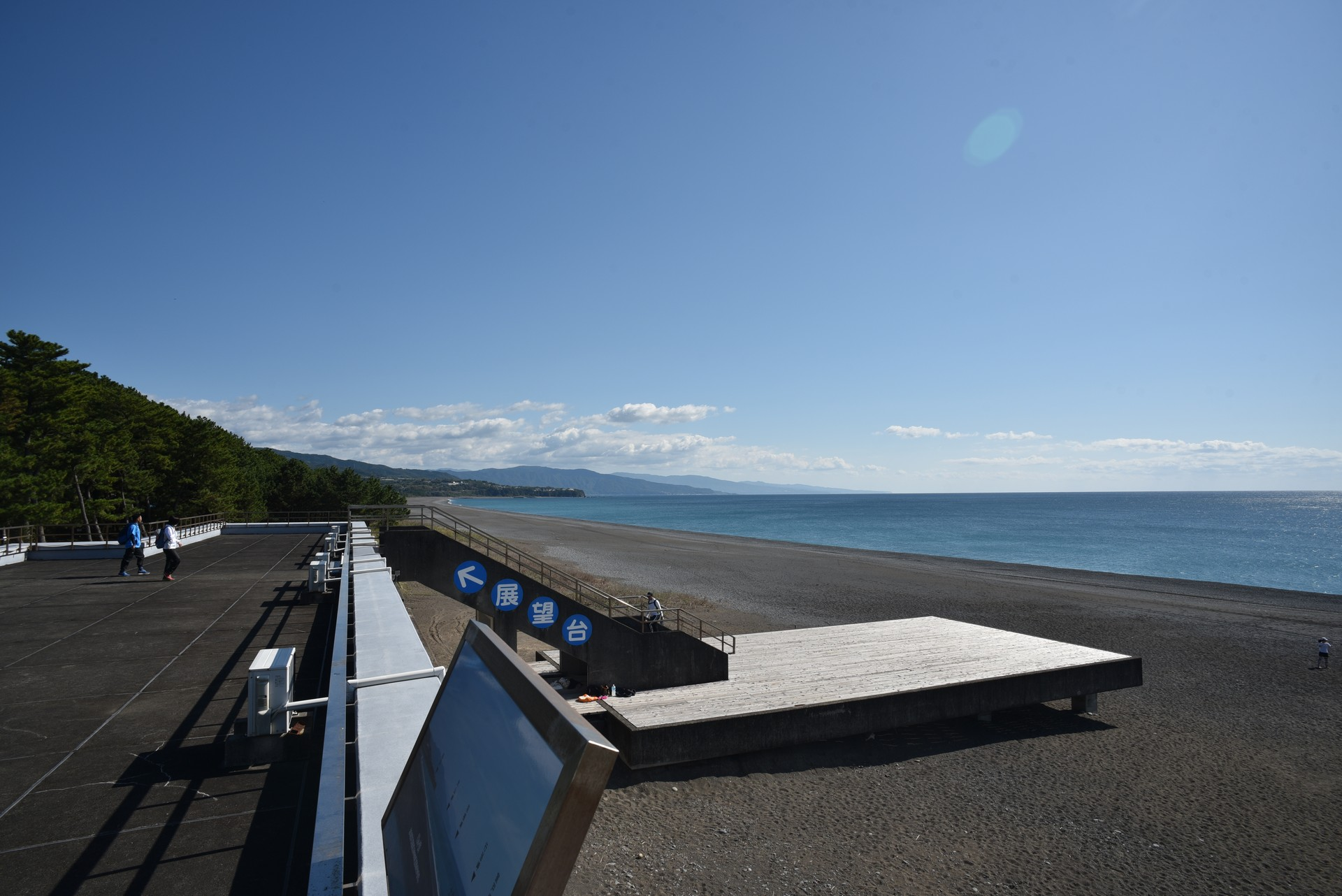
Kotogahama beach

Geisei (芸西村, Geisei-mura) is a village located in Aki District, Kōchi Prefecture, Japan. As of 30 June 2022, the village had an estimated population of 3,636 in 1767 households and a population density of 92 persons per km^{2}. The total area of the village is 39.60 square kilometres (15.29 sq mi).

== Geography ==
Geisei is located in southeastern Kōchi Prefecture on the island of Shikoku. It is facing the Pacific Ocean to the south and mountains in the north.

=== Neighbouring municipalities ===
Kōchi Prefecture

- Aki
- Kōnan

=== Climate ===
Geisei has a humid subtropical climate (Köppen climate classification Cfa) with hot summers and cool winters. Precipitation is high, but there is a pronounced difference between the wetter summers and drier winters.

== Demographics ==
Per Japanese census data, the population of Geisei has decreased steadily since the 1960s.

Historical population
Year	Pop.	±%
1950	6,689	—
1960	5,746	−14.1%
1970	4,601	−19.9%
1980	4,653	+1.1%
1990	4,539	−2.5%
2000	4,355	−4.1%
2010	4,048	−7.0%
2020	3,694	−8.7%

== History ==
As with all of Kōchi Prefecture, the area of Geisei was part of ancient Tosa Province. The name of Aki District appears in Nara period records. During the Edo period, the area was part of the holdings of Tosa Domain ruled by the Yamauchi clan from their seat at Kōchi Castle. The villages of Wajiki (和食村), Umanoue (馬ノ上村) and Nishibun (西分村) were established with the creation of the modern municipalities system on October 1, 1889. The three villages merged on July 20, 1954 to form the village of Geisei.

== Government ==
Geisei has a mayor-council form of government with a directly elected mayor and a unicameral village council of five members. Geisei, together with the other municipalities of Aki District, contributes one member to the Kōchi Prefectural Assembly. In terms of national politics, the village is part of Kōchi 1st district of the lower house of the Diet of Japan. Geisei's first mayor, Masao Okamura, served from 1946 as mayor of Nishibun to his retirement in 1996 for 50 years in the same post. He had been reelected 13 consecutive times, ten of which elections were unopposed.

== Economy ==
The local economy is centered on horticulture and greenhouse farming, with commercial fishing and forestry playing a smaller roles.

== Education ==
Geisei has one public elementary school and one public middle schools operated by the village government. The village does not have a high school.

== Transportation ==
=== Railway ===
Tosa Kuroshio Railway - Asa Line

- Nishibun - Wajiki

=== Highways ===
- National Route 55
