= Závist =

Závist may refer to:

== Places in the Czech Republic ==
- Závist (Blansko District), a municipality and village in the South Moravian Region
- Závist, a hamlet and part of Předklášteří in the South Moravian Region
- Závist, a village and part of Lavičky in the Vysočina Region
- Závist, a village and part of Rybník (Domažlice District) in the Plzeň Region
- Závist, a former oppidum in today's Dolní Břežany in the Central Bohemian Region

== Other ==
- 7440 Závist, a main belt asteroid
