= Počátky =

- Town
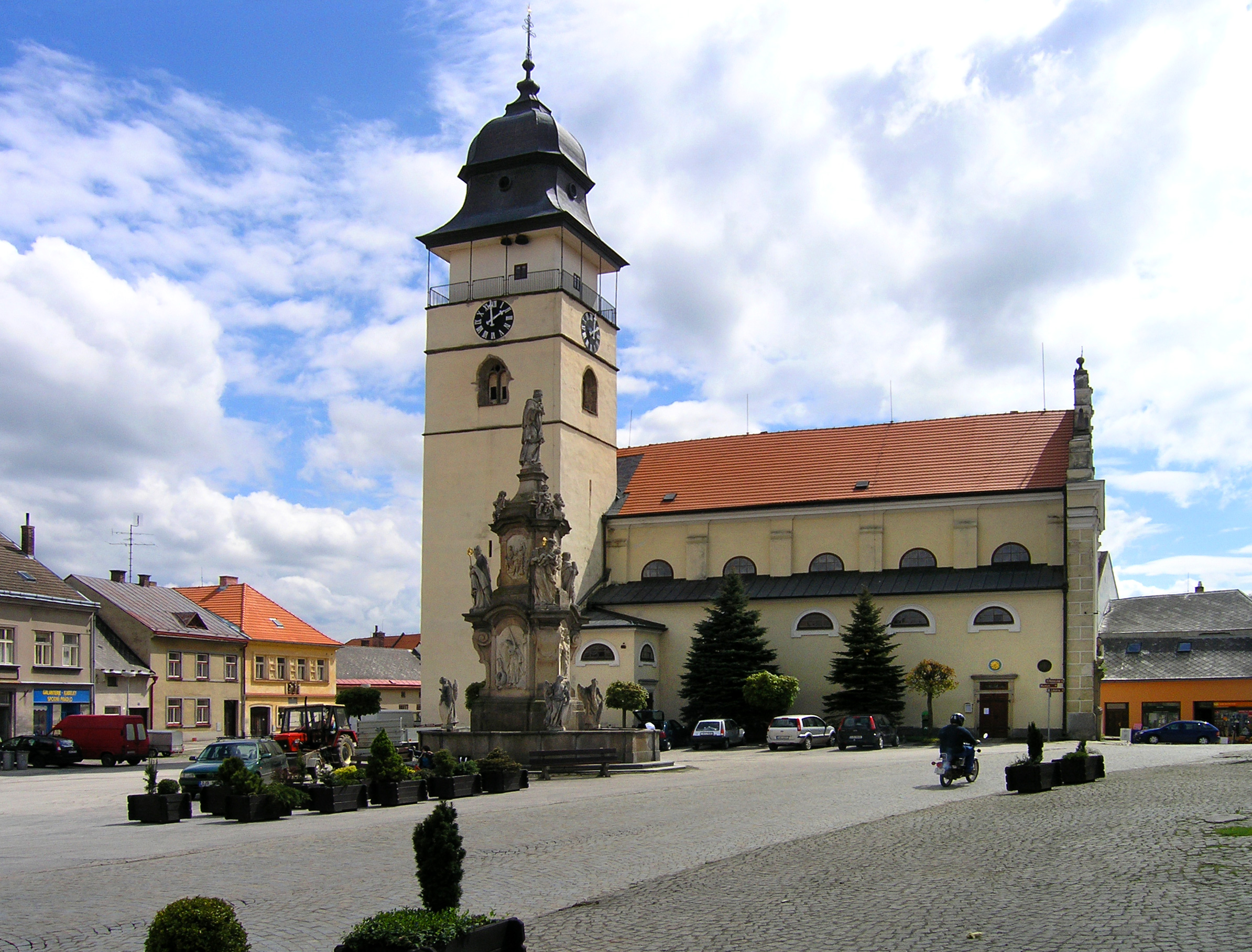
- Church of Saint John the Baptist

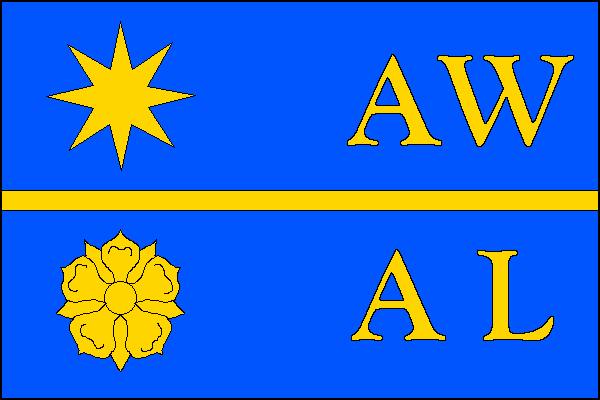
- Flag Coat of arms

- Location in the Czech Republic
- Coordinates: 49°15′37″N 15°14′25″E
- Country: Czech Republic
- Region: Vysočina
- District: Pelhřimov
- First mentioned: 1289

Government
  - Mayor: Karel Štefl

Area
  - Total: 30.84 km^{2} (11.91 sq mi)
- Elevation: 620 m (2,030 ft)

Population (2026-01-01)
  - Total: 2,452
  - Density: 79.51/km^{2} (205.9/sq mi)
- Time zone: UTC+1 (CET)
  - Summer (DST): UTC+2 (CEST)
- Postal code: 394 64
- Website: www.pocatky.cz

Počátky (Czech pronunciation: [ˈpotʃaːtkɪ]; German: Potschatek) is a town in Pelhřimov District in the Vysočina Region of the Czech Republic. It has about 2,500 inhabitants. The town is located on the stream Počátecký potok in the Křemešník Highlands and is situated on both sides of the historical Bohemian-Moravian border.

Počátky was founded in the second half of the 13th century. The historic town centre is well preserved and is protected as an urban monument zone. The main landmark is the Church of Saint John the Baptist.

== Administrative division ==
Počátky consists of six municipal parts (in brackets population according to the 2021 census):

- Počátky (2,301)
- Heřmaneč (17)
- Horní Vilímeč (41)
- Léskovec (25)
- Prostý (31)
- Vesce (90)

== Etymology ==
There are springs of many watercourses in the area of Počátky. The name Počátky (literally 'beginnings' in Czech) refers to the beginnings of rivers.

== Geography ==
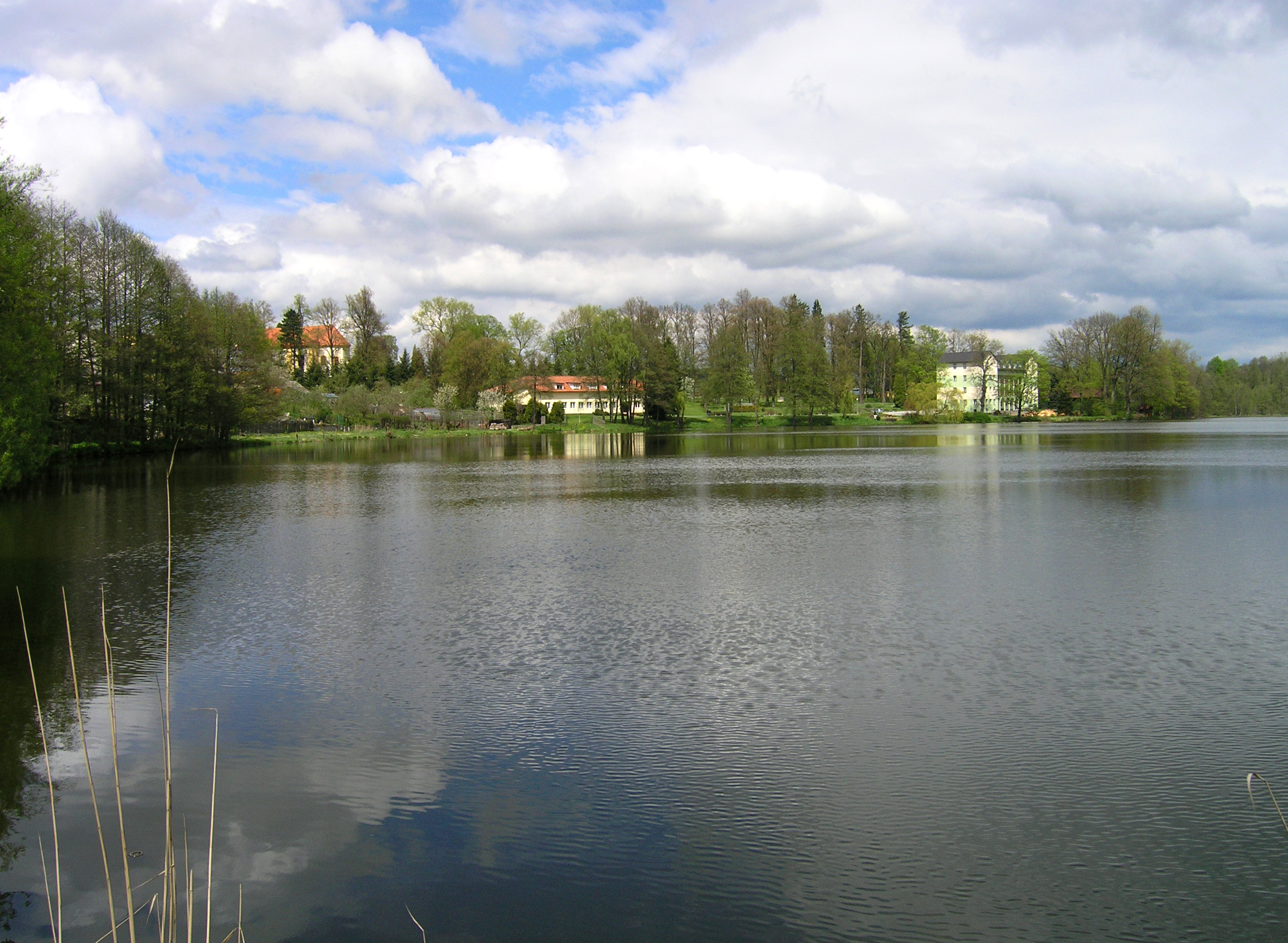
The fishpond Tovární rybník

Počátky is located about 18 kilometres (11 mi) south of Pelhřimov and 29 km (18 mi) southwest of Jihlava. It lies in the Křemešník Highlands. The highest point is at 714 m (2,343 ft) above sea level. The stream Počátecký potok flows through the town. The territory of Počátky is rich in fishponds; the largest of them is Velký Klátů rybník. Tovární rybník is located in the urban area.

The municipal territory lies on the border between Bohemia and Moravia. The Bohemian part includes Heřmaneč, Léskovec and Počátky (with the exception of agro-forest lands in the south). The Moravian part consists of Prostý, Vesce and the larger part of Horní Vilímeč.

Along the road from Počátky to Kaliště, the longest larch alley in the country is planted. It was founded in the early 20th century and includes 280 trees.

== History ==
Due to the higher altitude, the first settlement was established no earlier than in the second half of the 13th century. The first written mention of Počátky is from 1289. It was originally a market village. The first known owner was Vítek of Švábenice who acquired it by marrying Perchta of Kralovany. In 1389, Počátky was bought by the Lords of Hradec. During the Hussite Wars, the town gained the right to build stone walls.

The economical development occurred during the industrialisation in the second half of the 19th century. Some of the factories have remained in operation to this day. In the early 20th century, Svatá Kateřina Spa with a healing spring was established and Počátky became a tourist centre.

== Demographics ==
Historical population

Year	Pop.	±%
1869	3,717	—
1880	3,834	+3.1%
1890	3,942	+2.8%
1900	3,738	−5.2%
1910	3,744	+0.2%

Year	Pop.	±%
1921	3,472	−7.3%
1930	3,228	−7.0%
1950	2,736	−15.2%
1961	2,701	−1.3%
1970	2,633	−2.5%

Year	Pop.	±%
1980	3,048	+15.8%
1991	2,856	−6.3%
2001	2,755	−3.5%
2011	2,683	−2.6%
2021	2,505	−6.6%

Source: Censuses

== Transport ==
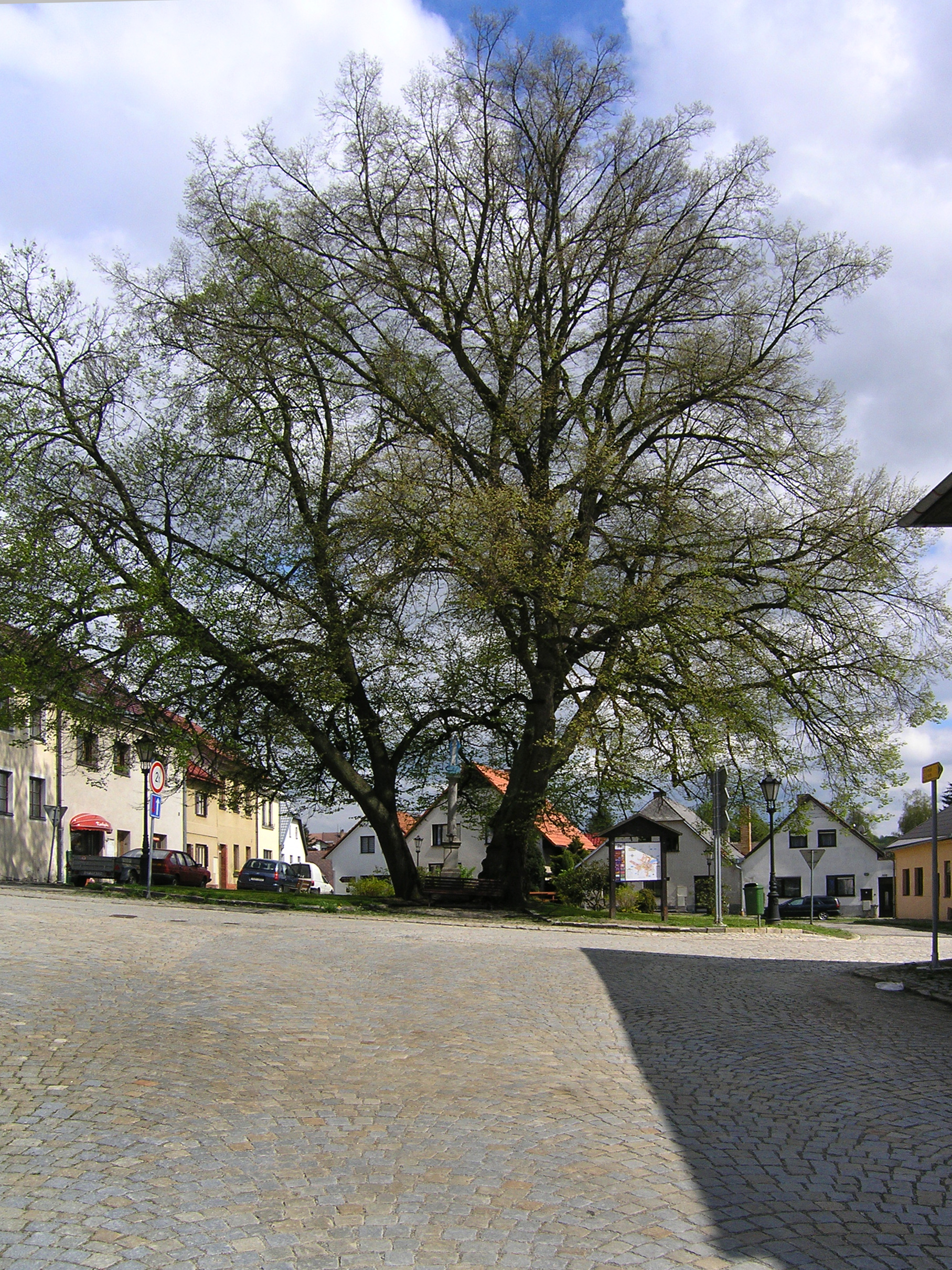
The square Mariánské náměstí

The railway line from Brno to Plzeň passes through the southern part of the municipal territory. The train station called Počátky-Žirovnice, which serves Počátky, is located in neighbouring Stojčín.

== Culture ==
In 2011, the former cinema building was reconstructed into a multifunctional complex, which houses the town library, a hall used as a cinema or theatre, an art gallery, a meeting place for volunteer associations and a town information centre.

== Education ==
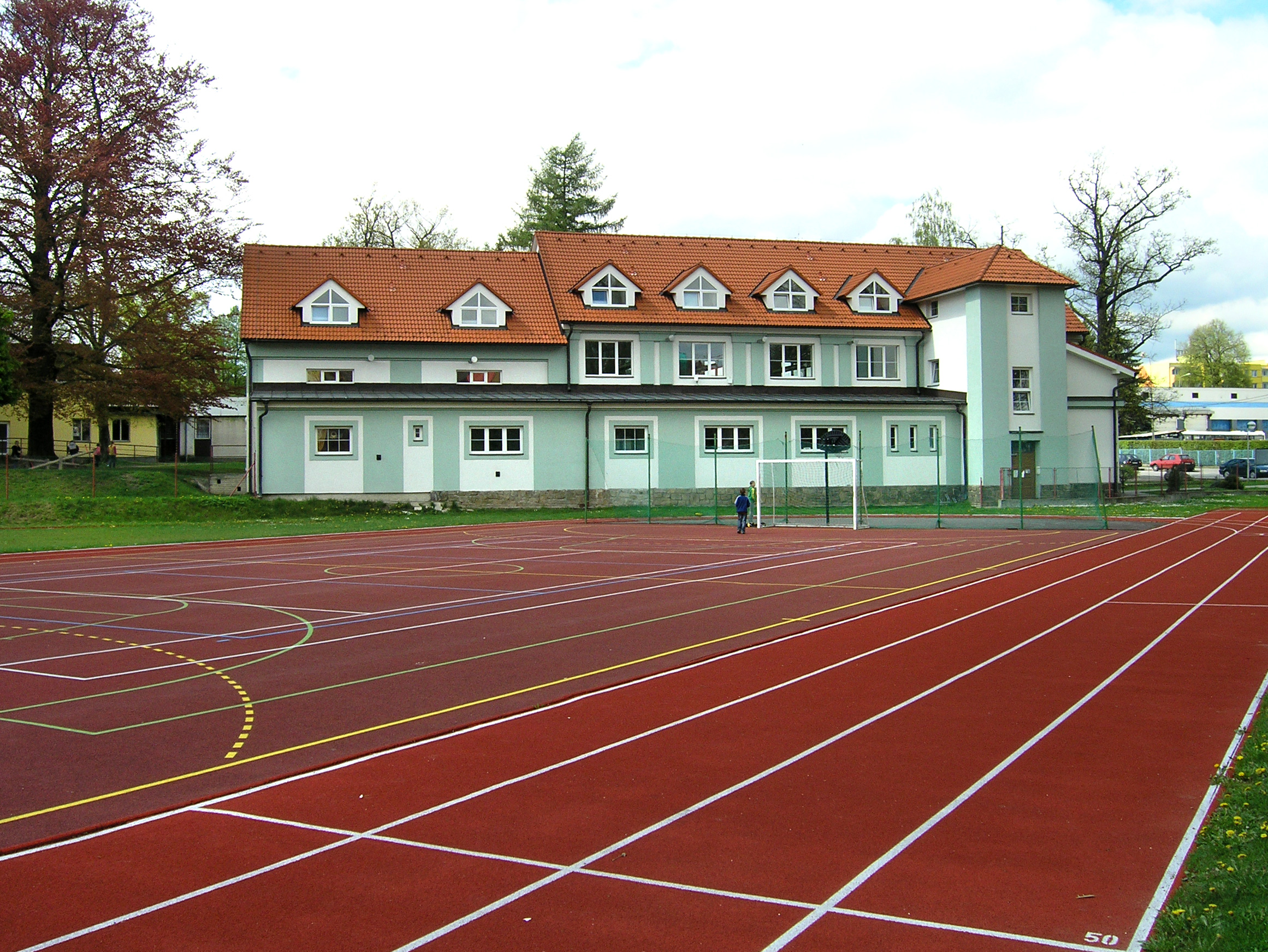
Primary school

In Počátky there is a facility with regional significance which comprises educational institute for girls with behavioural problems, children's home with school, high school and primary school. There is also a kindergarten and Otokar Březina Primary School with local significance.

== Sights ==
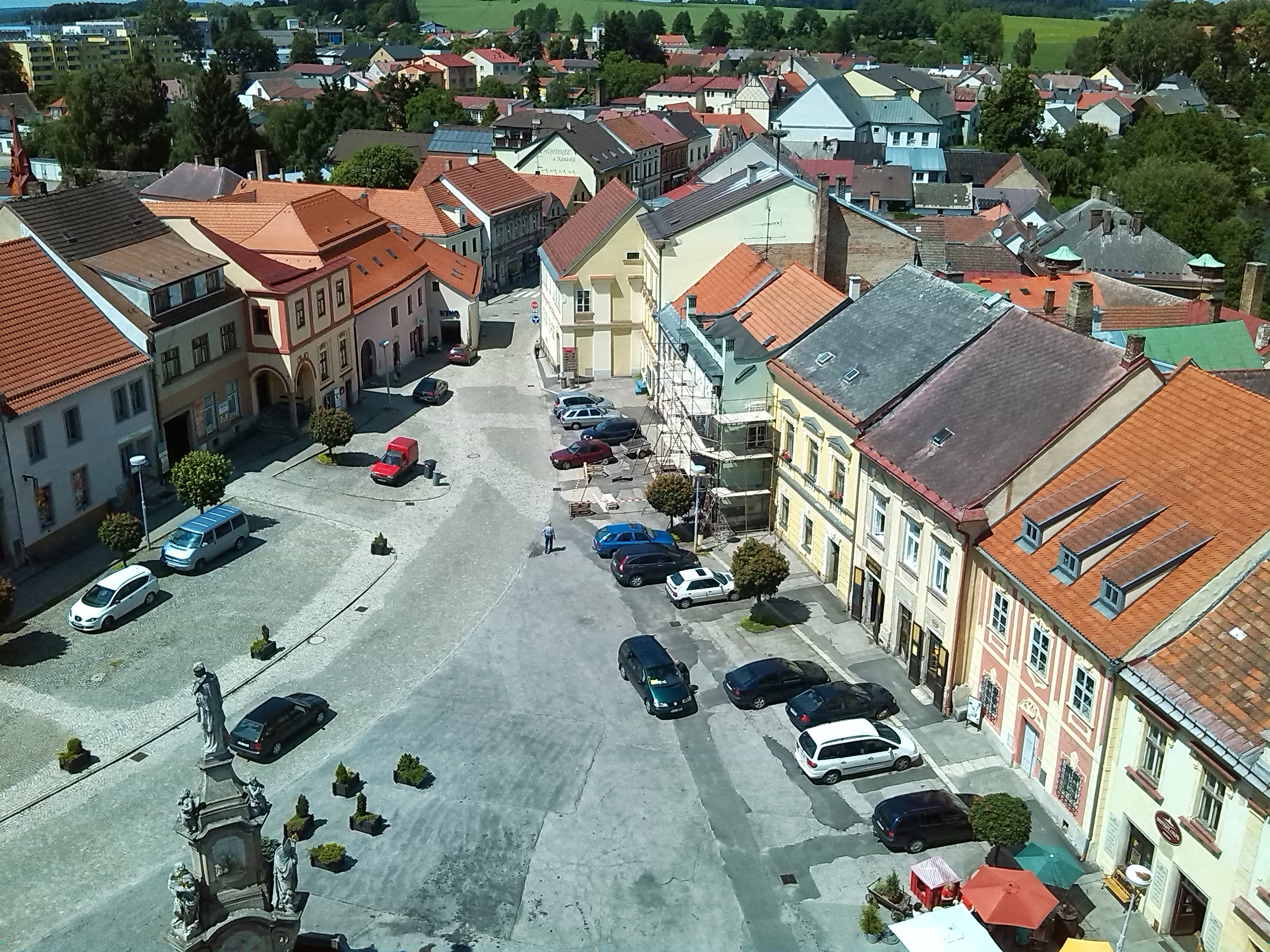
Palackého Square

Počátky has preserved historic centre with several small squares. The main and the largest square is Palackého náměstí. It is lined by valuable burgher houses. Its main landmark is the Church of Saint John the Baptist with an accessible tower. In the middle of the square is a fountain with a sculpture of St. John of Nepomuk.

On the square there is also the Town Museum with ethnographic and numismatic collections. It was founded in 1892 and is the oldest museum in the region. The museum also manages the Otokar Březina birth house with an exposition on the life and work of the town's most famous native.

Other sights in the town include the Church of Corpus Christi. It is a cemetery church, rebuilt to its current Baroque form in 1705–1711. There is also the Church of Saint Catherine near the healing spring.

== In popular culture ==
Some of the scenes of the films and TV series Cutting It Short (1980), Návštěvníci (1983) and The Ride (1994) were shot in Počátky.

== Notable people ==
- Otokar Březina (1868–1929), poet and essayist
- Vítězslav Novák (1870–1949), composer; lived here in 1872–1882
- Miloš Tichý (born 1966), astronomer
- Jaroslav Drobný (born 1979), footballer

== Twin towns – sister cities ==
Počátky is twinned with:

- Konolfingen, Switzerland
- Lokca, Slovakia

== Honours ==
The asteroid 14974 Počátky was named after the town by its discoverer Miloš Tichý, a native of Počátky.
