= Strukov =

- Municipality
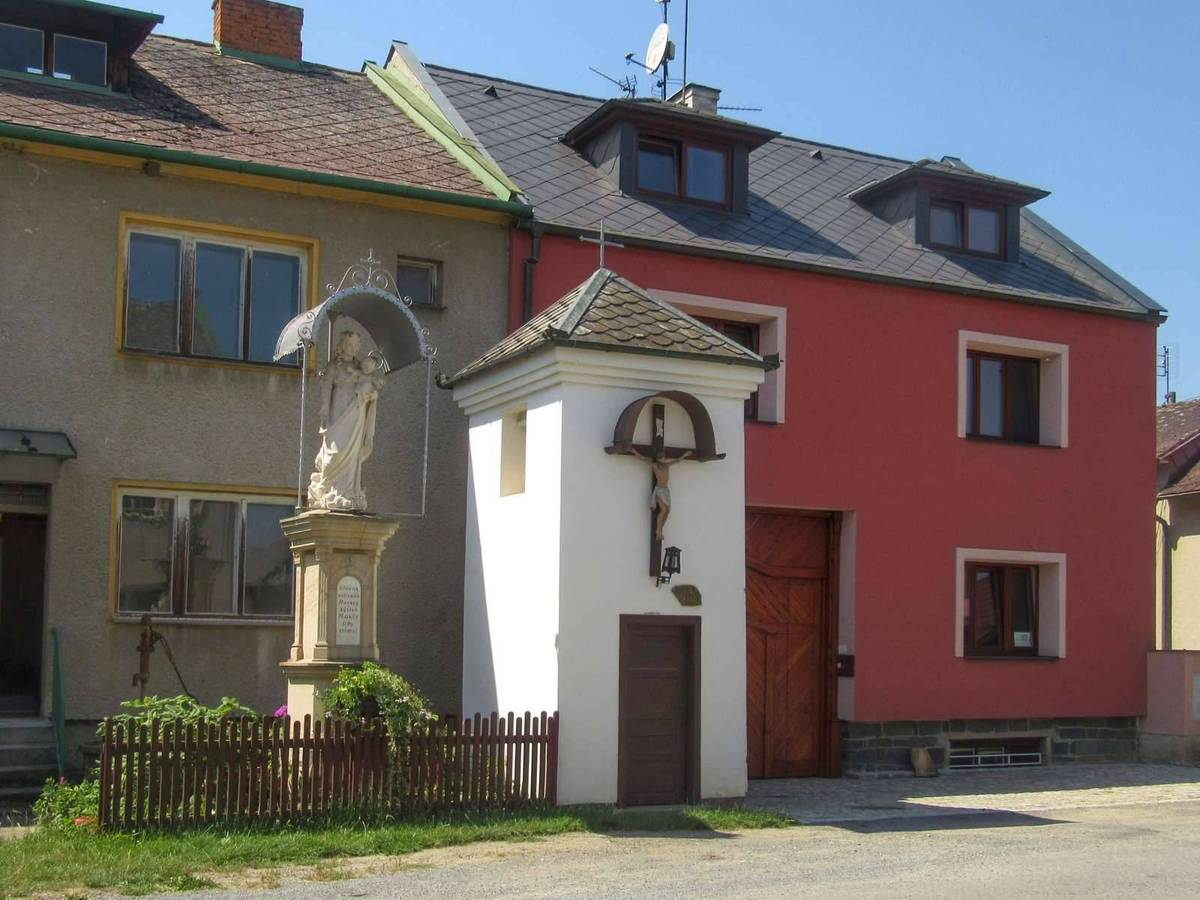
- Belfry in the centre of Strukov

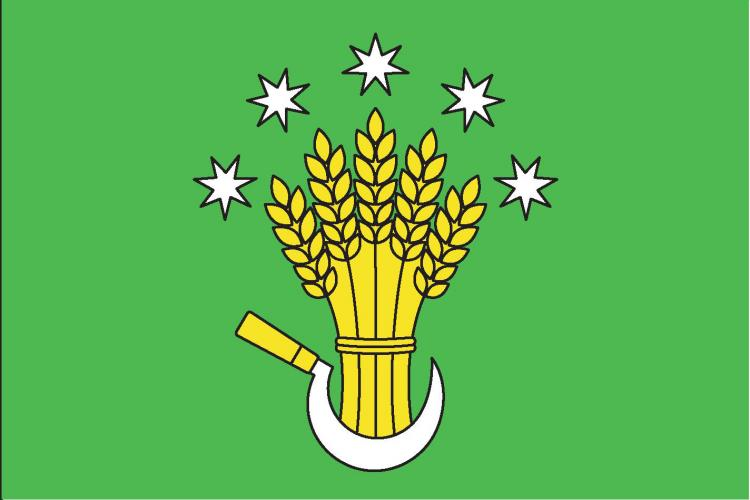
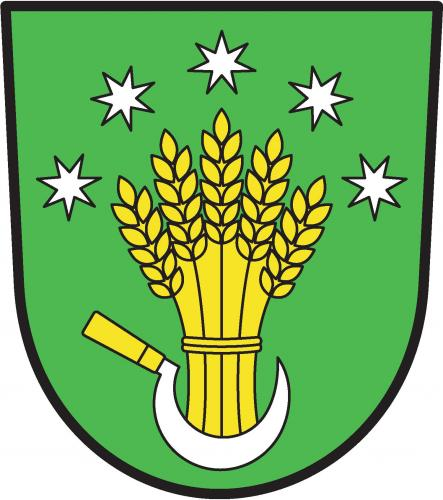
- Flag Coat of arms

- Location in the Czech Republic
- Coordinates: 49°44′0″N 17°10′32″E
- Country: Czech Republic
- Region: Olomouc
- District: Olomouc
- Founded: 1789

Area
  - Total: 0.53 km^{2} (0.20 sq mi)
- Elevation: 229 m (751 ft)

Population (2026-01-01)
  - Total: 166
  - Density: 310/km^{2} (810/sq mi)
- Time zone: UTC+1 (CET)
  - Summer (DST): UTC+2 (CEST)
- Postal code: 784 01
- Website: www.strukov.cz

Strukov is a municipality and village in Olomouc District in the Olomouc Region of the Czech Republic. It has about 200 inhabitants.

== Geography ==
Strukov is located about 16 kilometres (10 mi) north of Olomouc. It lies in a flat agricultural landscape in the Upper Morava Valley.

With an area of 0.53 square kilometres (0.20 sq mi), Strukov is the second smallest municipality in the country (after Závist).

== History ==
Strukov was founded in 1789.

== Demographics ==
Historical population

Year	Pop.	±%
1869	189	—
1880	196	+3.7%
1890	205	+4.6%
1900	189	−7.8%
1910	222	+17.5%

Year	Pop.	±%
1921	223	+0.5%
1930	237	+6.3%
1950	187	−21.1%
1961	210	+12.3%
1970	213	+1.4%

Year	Pop.	±%
1980	202	−5.2%
1991	179	−11.4%
2001	157	−12.3%
2011	137	−12.7%
2021	158	+15.3%

Source: Censuses

== Transport ==
There are no railways or major roads passing through the municipality.

== Sights ==
There are two protected cultural monuments in Strukov: a stone conciliation cross, which was created sometime in the 15th–17th centuries, and a house from the second half of the 19th century with a memorial plaque of historian and university professor František Hrubý, who was born there.
