= Wilfried Hanke =

German violinist

- Born: September 23, 1901; Levín, Bohemia, Austria-Hungary
- Occupations: Violinist; music educator
- Employer(s): Berlin Philharmonic; Hamburg State Theatre; Philharmonisches Staatsorchester Hamburg; Hochschule für Musik und Theater Hamburg
- Known for: Concertmaster of the Hamburg State Theatre; member of the Berlin Philharmonic; primarius of the Hanke Quartet

Wilfried Hanke (23 September 1901 – ?) was a German violinist and music educator.

== Life ==
Hanke was born in Levín in Bohemia, Austria-Hungary (now the Czech Republic).

He joined the Berlin Philharmonic orchestra in 1927 under the principal conductor Wilhelm Furtwängler. In 1932/33 he was an active member of the orchestra, finally as second concertmaster. In 1931, he was also a member of the Bayreuth Festival Orchestra, which was conducted by Furtwängler at the time. On 1 January 1934, Hanke became first concertmaster at the Hamburg State Theatre. In 1934 the Philharmonic Orchestra and the City Theatre Orchestra merged to form the Philharmonisches Staatsorchester Hamburg, where he was also concertmaster. He played with the conductors Eugen Jochum, Joseph Keilberth and Wolfgang Sawallisch.

From 1938 to 1943, he was primarius of the Hanke Quartet in Hamburg. He played with Rudolf Prick (2nd violin), Fritz Lang (viola) and Rudolf Metzmacher and Bernhard Günther (violoncello). Together with Carl Seemann (piano) and Atis Teichmannis (cello), he performed in the Seemann Trio. He was soloist among others at the premiere of Willy Czernik's Violin Concerto in A minor (with the Staatsorchester Braunschweig) and by Rudolf von Oertzen's Symphonischer Dialog for solo violins and orchestra (conducted by Wolfgang Sawallisch). Furthermore, in 1941 he conducted in Hamburg Conventgarten the premiere of Helmut Paulsen's Sonata for violin and piano (with the composer).

From the 1950s, he was also professor of violin at the Hochschule für Musik und Theater Hamburg.

== Literature ==
- Gerassimos Avgerinos: Künstler-Biographien: die Mitglieder im Berliner Philharmonischen Orchester von 1882–1972. self edited, Berlin 1972, p. 62.
