= Miloš Tichý =

Czech astronomer

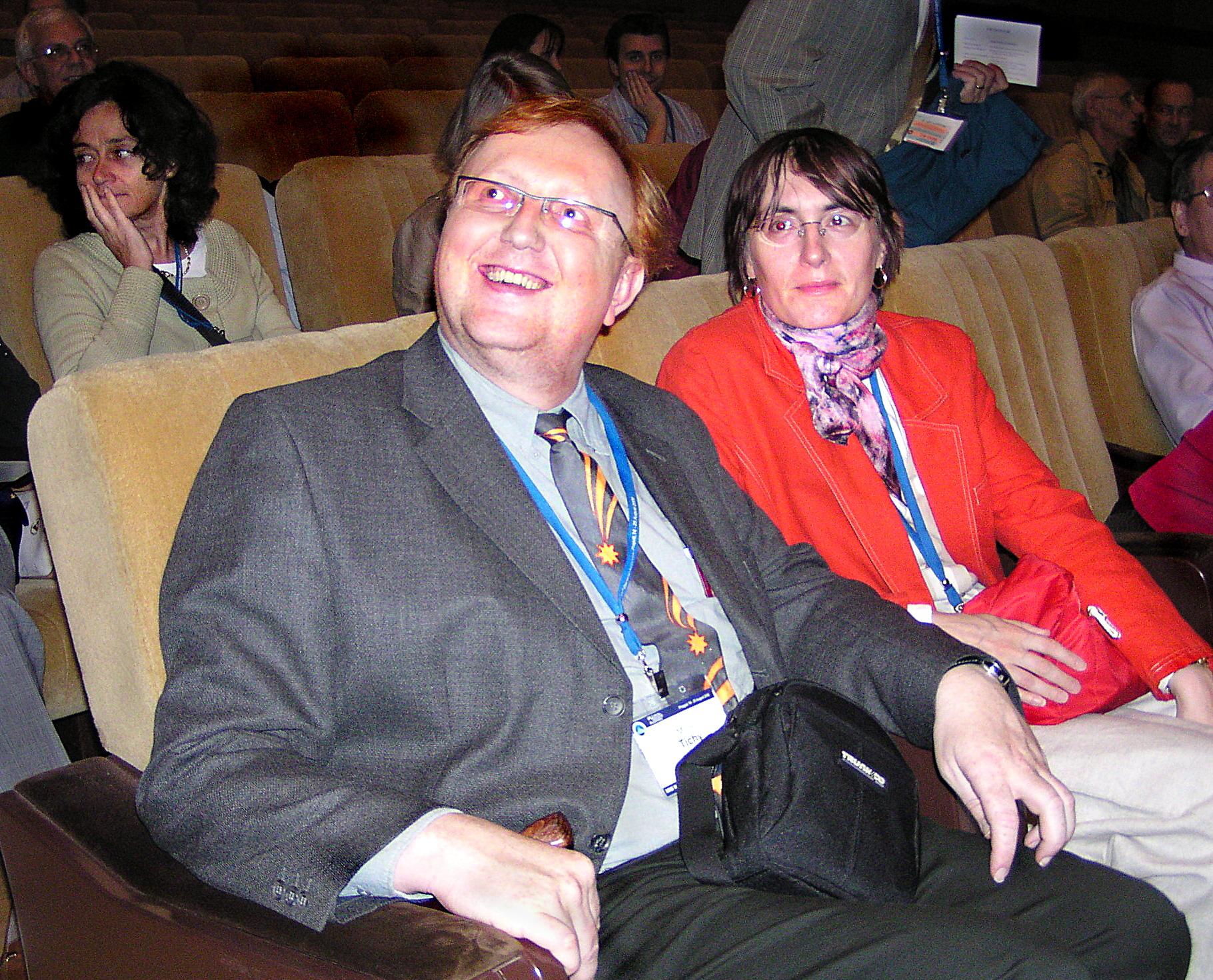
Miloš Tichý and his ex-wife Jana Tichá

Miloš Tichý (born 1966 in Počátky) is a Czech astronomer.

He is a prolific discoverer of asteroids. He also discovered the periodic comet 196P/Tichý. He works together with his ex-wife at Kleť Observatory. Asteroid 3337 Miloš is named after him.

== Discoveries ==
Minor planets discovered: 232
see § List of discovered minor planets

=== List of discovered comets ===
important;"
P/2000 U6 Tichý	October 23, 2000
Comets discovered: 1

=== List of discovered minor planets ===
List of minor planets

6426 Vanýsek	2 March 1995	list
6802 Černovice	24 October 1995	list
6928 Lanna	11 October 1994	list
7359 Messier	16 January 1996	list
7440 Závist	1 March 1995	list
7441 Láska	30 July 1995	list^{[A]}
7495 Feynman	22 November 1995	list^{[B]}
7496 Miroslavholub	27 November 1995	list
7532 Pelhřimov	22 October 1995	list
7669 Malše	4 August 1995	list^{[B]}

7791 Ebicykl	1 March 1995	list
7846 Setvák	16 January 1996	list
8048 Andrle	22 February 1995	list^{[B]}
8222 Gellner	22 July 1996	list^{[B]}
8554 Gabreta	25 May 1995	list
8572 Nijo	19 October 1996	list^{[A]}
8740 Václav	12 January 1998	list^{[B]}
9102 Foglar	12 December 1996	list^{[B]}
9224 Železný	10 January 1996	list^{[B]}
9884 Příbram	12 October 1994	list^{[B]}

10170 Petrjakeš	22 February 1995	list^{[B]}
10205 Pokorný	7 August 1997	list^{[B]}
10213 Koukolík	10 September 1997	list^{[B]}
10234 Sixtygarden	27 December 1997	list^{[A]}
10403 Marcelgrün	22 November 1997	list^{[A]}
10577 Jihčesmuzeum	2 May 1995	list
10872 Vaculík	12 October 1996	list^{[A]}
11124 Mikulášek	14 October 1996	list^{[B]}
11128 Ostravia	3 November 1996	list^{[A]}
11134 České Budějovice	4 December 1996	list^{[B]}

11141 Jindrawalter	12 January 1997	list^{[A]}
11144 Radiocommunicata	2 February 1997	list^{[A]}
11338 Schiele	13 October 1996	list^{[A]}
11339 Orlík	13 November 1996	list^{[B]}
11656 Lipno	6 March 1997	list^{[B]}
12010 Kovářov	18 October 1996	list^{[A]}
12406 Zvíkov	25 September 1995	list^{[B]}
12448 Mr. Tompkins	12 December 1996	list^{[B]}
12833 Kamenný Újezd	2 February 1997	list^{[A]}
13229 Echion	2 November 1997	list^{[A]}

13681 Monty Python	7 August 1997	list^{[B]}
13792 Kuščynskyj	7 November 1998	list^{[A]}
13804 Hrazany	9 December 1998	list^{[B]}
14054 Dušek	12 January 1996	list^{[B]}
14068 Hauserová	21 April 1996	list^{[A]}
14190 Soldán	15 December 1998	list^{[B]}
14206 Sehnal	15 February 1999	list^{[B]}
14537 Týn nad Vltavou	10 September 1997	list^{[B]}
14541 Sacrobosco	20 September 1997	list^{[A]}
14948 Bartuška	16 January 1996	list^{[A]}

14974 Počátky	22 September 1997	list
15374 Teta	16 January 1997	list^{[B]}
15399 Hudec	2 November 1997	list^{[A]}
15890 Prachatice	3 April 1997	list^{[B]}
15960 Hluboká	2 February 1998	list^{[B]}
16083 Jorvik	12 October 1999	list^{[A]}
16742 Zink	21 July 1996	list^{[A]}
16781 Renčín	12 December 1996	list^{[B]}
16794 Cucullia	2 February 1997	list^{[A]}
17167 Olgarozanova	4 July 1999	list^{[A]}

17607 Táborsko	2 October 1995	list^{[B]}
17608 Terezín	12 October 1995	list
17694 Jiránek	4 March 1997	list^{[B]}
17805 Švestka	30 March 1998	list^{[B]}
18456 Mišík	8 March 1995	list^{[A]}
18497 Nevězice	11 June 1996	list^{[B]}
18531 Strakonice	4 December 1996	list^{[B]}
18841 Hruška	6 September 1999	list^{[A]}
19384 Winton	6 February 1998	list^{[A]}
20164 Janzajíc	9 November 1996	list^{[A]}

20187 Janapittichová	14 January 1997	list
20364 Zdeněkmiler	20 May 1998	list^{[B]}
21270 Otokar	19 July 1996	list^{[A]}
21290 Vydra	9 November 1996	list^{[B]}
21602 Ialmenus	17 December 1998	list^{[B]}
21785 Méchain	21 September 1999	list
21873 Jindřichůvhradec	29 October 1999	list^{[A]}
22442 Blaha	14 October 1996	list^{[A]}
22450 Nové Hrady	3 November 1996	list^{[A]}
22465 Karelanděl	15 January 1997	list^{[B]}

22503 Thalpius	7 October 1997	list^{[B]}
22618 Silva Nortica	28 May 1998	list
23650 Čvančara	7 February 1997	list
24837 Mšecké Žehrovice	22 October 1995	list
24838 Abilunon	23 October 1995	list
25258 Nathaniel	7 November 1998	list^{[A]}
25340 Segoves	10 September 1999	list^{[B]}
25434 Westonia	29 November 1999	list
26314 Škvorecký	16 October 1998	list^{[A]}
26328 Litomyšl	18 November 1998	list^{[B]}

26340 Evamarková	13 December 1998	list^{[A]}
26969 Biver	20 September 1997	list^{[A]}
26971 Sezimovo Ústí	25 September 1997	list^{[B]}
27087 Tillmannmohr	24 October 1998	list^{[A]}
27961 Kostelecký	22 September 1997	list
28220 York	28 December 1998	list^{[A]}
29401 Asterix	1 October 1996	list^{[B]}
29402 Obelix	14 October 1996	list^{[B]}
29477 Zdíkšíma	31 October 1997	list^{[A]}
29555 MACEK	18 February 1998	list^{[B]}

29668 Ipf	9 December 1998	list
29738 Ivobudil	23 January 1999	list^{[A]}
31092 Carolowilhelmina	6 February 1997	list^{[B]}
31109 Janpalouš	14 August 1997	list^{[B]}
31124 Slavíček	22 September 1997	list
31232 Slavonice	1 February 1998	list^{[A]}
31238 Kroměříž	21 February 1998	list^{[A]}
32596 Čepek	29 August 2001	list
33061 Václavmorava	2 November 1997	list^{[A]}
35233 Krčín	26 May 1995	list^{[A]}

35239 Ottoseydl	25 September 1995	list^{[B]}
35268 Panoramix	19 August 1996	list
35269 Idefix	21 August 1996	list^{[A]}
(35445) 1998 CY	5 February 1998	list^{[B]}
35446 Stáňa	6 February 1998	list^{[A]}
35977 Lexington	3 July 1999	list^{[A]}
35978 Arlington	5 July 1999	list^{[A]}
36035 Petrvok	6 August 1999	list^{[A]}
37699 Santini-Aichl	13 January 1996	list^{[A]}
37736 Jandl	15 November 1996	list^{[A]}

38246 Palupín	14 August 1999	list^{[A]}
40206 Lhenice	26 September 1998	list^{[A]}
40230 Rožmberk	14 October 1998	list
43954 Chýnov	7 February 1997	list^{[B]}
43971 Gabzdyl	8 April 1997	list^{[B]}
(44031) 1998 CO	3 February 1998	list^{[B]}
44530 Horáková	25 December 1998	list^{[A]}
44597 Thoreau	6 August 1999	list^{[A]}
44885 Vodička	1 November 1999	list^{[A]}
45299 Stivell	6 January 2000	list

46692 Taormina	2 February 1997	list^{[A]}
47144 Faulkes	7 August 1999	list^{[A]}
47294 Blanský les	28 November 1999	list^{[A]}
48638 Třebíč	3 October 1995	list
48794 Stolzová	5 October 1997	list^{[A]}
48844 Belloves	18 February 1998	list^{[B]}
49698 Váchal	1 November 1999	list^{[A]}
50413 Petrginz	27 February 2000	list^{[A]}
52665 Brianmay	30 January 1998	list^{[A]}
53093 La Orotava	28 December 1998	list^{[A]}

55082 Xlendi	25 August 2001	list^{[A]}
56329 Tarxien	28 November 1999	list^{[A]}
56422 Mnajdra	2 April 2000	list^{[A]}
58424 Jamesdunlop	22 February 1996	list^{[B]}
58607 Wenzel	19 October 1997	list^{[A]}
58608 Geroldrichter	22 October 1997	list
58664 IYAMMIX	21 December 1997	list^{[A]}
58682 Alenašolcová	10 January 1998	list^{[A]}
59001 Senftenberg	26 September 1998	list^{[A]}
59797 Píšala	7 August 1999	list^{[A]}

59830 Reynek	10 September 1999	list^{[A]}
60423 Chvojen	4 February 2000	list
60669 Georgpick	7 April 2000	list
61208 Stonařov	30 July 2000	list^{[A]}
(65895) 1998 CP	3 February 1998	list^{[B]}
66934 Kálalová	26 November 1999	list^{[A]}
69469 Krumbenowe	16 November 1996	list^{[A]}
70409 Srnín	21 September 1999	list
70679 Urzidil	30 October 1999	list^{[A]}
70936 Kámen	28 November 1999	list^{[A]}

74024 Hrabě	23 April 1998	list^{[A]}
74370 Kolářjan	9 December 1998	list^{[A]}
75223 Wupatki	28 November 1999	list^{[A]}
76628 Kozí Hrádek	22 April 2000	list^{[A]}
79354 Brundibár	16 January 1997	list^{[A]}
79347 Medlov	4 December 1996	list^{[A]}
(79477) 1998 CN	3 February 1998	list^{[B]}
(85328) 1995 PA	1 August 1995	list^{[B]}
85389 Rosenauer	22 August 1996	list^{[A]}
85516 Vaclík	2 November 1997	list^{[A]}

(85573) 1998 CE	1 February 1998	list^{[A]}
(85574) 1998 CG	1 February 1998	list^{[A]}
87097 Lomaki	7 June 2000	list^{[A]}
90821 Augustsedlacek	26 September 1995	list^{[B]}
90892 Betlémská kaple	16 January 1997	list
90926 Stáhalík	22 September 1997	list
91006 Fleming	28 January 1998	list^{[B]}
91007 Ianfleming	30 January 1998	list^{[A]}
92213 Kalina	5 January 2000	list
95072 ČVUT	15 January 2000	list

(100719) 1998 BU_{26}	29 January 1998	list^{[B]}
100728 Kamenice n Lipou	2 February 1998	list^{[B]}
(100729) 1998 CX	5 February 1998	list^{[B]}
100732 Blankavalois	19 February 1998	list
100733 Annafalcká	18 February 1998	list
100734 Annasvídnická	18 February 1998	list
100735 Alpomořanská	19 February 1998	list^{[A]}
101721 Emanuelfritsch	13 March 1999	list^{[A]}
118214 Agnesediboemia	12 January 1996	list^{[A]}
(118254) 1998 CU	4 February 1998	list^{[B]}

120643 Rudimandl	10 September 1996	list
121089 Vyšší Brod	24 March 1999	list
129595 Vand	2 November 1997	list^{[A]}
133077 Jirsík	4 May 2003	list^{[A]}
136666 Seidel	17 September 1995	list^{[A]}
136825 Slawitschek	26 September 1997	list^{[A]}
138979 Černice	14 February 2001	list
145768 Petiška	12 August 1997	list^{[B]}
(152660) 1998 CW	5 February 1998	list^{[B]}
152733 Vincenclesný	25 November 1998	list

152750 Brloh	21 January 1999	list^{[A]}
(159380) 1998 CV	4 February 1998	list^{[B]}
(160027) 1997 UN_{1}	23 October 1997	list^{[B]}
(161259) 2003 FN_{6}	26 March 2003	list^{[C]}
(167073) 2003 RG_{14}	15 September 2003	list
171588 Náprstek	26 November 1999	list^{[A]}
(172412) 2003 DC_{13}	26 February 2003	list^{[C]}
190333 Jirous	23 September 1998	list
192439 Cílek	1 November 1997	list^{[A]}
(196298) 2003 FQ	22 March 2003	list^{[A]}

(197871) 2004 RD_{8}	6 September 2004	list
(200104) 1995 SD	16 September 1995	list
(213784) 2003 FY_{4}	25 March 2003	list
(215606) 2003 SF_{36}	17 September 2003	list^{[A]}
(223225) 2003 DW_{7}	25 February 2003	list^{[A]}
(226317) 2003 DJ_{13}	27 February 2003	list^{[C]}
(231698) 1998 QC_{2}	19 August 1998	list^{[B]}
(235030) 2003 FO_{6}	26 March 2003	list^{[C]}
(259308) 2003 FY_{1}	23 March 2003	list^{[A]}
(259309) 2003 FB_{2}	23 March 2003	list^{[A]}

(259384) 2003 JX_{10}	4 May 2003	list^{[A]}
(259481) 2003 SY_{200}	25 September 2003	list^{[A]}
(266969) 2010 VU_{85}	19 September 2001	list
(275528) 1998 CM	3 February 1998	list^{[B]}
(298349) 2003 JW_{10}	4 May 2003	list^{[A]}
(306234) 2011 QT_{64}	27 February 2003	list^{[C]}
(307562) 2003 FX_{1}	23 March 2003	list^{[A]}
(313625) 2003 RH_{14}	15 September 2003	list
(322455) 2011 UG_{36}	14 February 2001	list
(326173) 2012 BC_{115}	14 February 2001	list

(334704) 2003 FM_{6}	26 March 2003	list^{[C]}
(338537) 2003 SX_{4}	16 September 2003	list
350509 Vepřoknedlozelo	14 January 2000	list
(382764) 2003 QP_{10}	22 August 2003	list^{[A]}
(393568) 2003 JY_{10}	4 May 2003	list^{[A]}
401820 Spilas	30 September 1996	list^{[B]}
(416251) 2003 EQ	5 March 2003	list^{[C]}
(461271) 2015 XF_{61}	1 September 1997	list^{[A]}
(461419) 2001 UH_{1}	16 October 2001	list
(474470) 2003 SA_{201}	25 September 2003	list^{[A]}

(552409) 2013 YC_{63}	22 February 2003	list^{[A]}
(553607) 2011 SR_{295}	4 September 2004	list^{[A]}
(560889) 2015 MX_{93}	22 February 2003	list^{[A]}
(595952) 2004 RP_{144}	8 September 2004	list
(608975) 2004 RK_{13}	5 September 2004	list^{[A]}
(609248) 2004 XE_{4}	5 December 2004	list^{[A]}
(612561) 2003 PQ	2 August 2003	list^{[A]}
(617401) 2005 BG_{32}	17 January 2005	list
(714873) 2015 RS_{96}	8 August 2004	list^{[A]}
(720969) 2002 SX_{66}	1 October 2002	list^{[C]}

(875181) 1999 VR_{6}	5 November 1999	list^{[A]}
Co-discovery made with:^{A} J. Tichá^{B} Z. Moravec^{C} M. Kočer

== See also ==
- List of minor planet discoverers § M. Tichy
