= 7846 Setvák =

Main-belt asteroid

Discovery
- Discovered by: M. Tichý
- Discovery site: Kleť Obs.
- Discovery date: 16 January 1996

Designations
- Named after: Stáňa and Martin Setvák (Czech meteorologist)
- Alternative designations: 1996 BJ · 1979 OZ_{2}
- Minor planet category: main-belt · Flora

Orbital characteristics
- Epoch 4 September 2017 (JD 2458000.5)
- Uncertainty parameter 0
- Observation arc: 37.53 yr (13,707 days)
- Aphelion: 2.7686 AU
- Perihelion: 1.9306 AU
- Semi-major axis: 2.3496 AU
- Eccentricity: 0.1783
- Orbital period (sidereal): 3.60 yr (1,315 days)
- Mean anomaly: 337.86°
- Inclination: 3.4546°
- Longitude of ascending node: 291.31°
- Argument of perihelion: 224.12°

Physical characteristics
- Dimensions: 2.69 km (calculated); 2.964±0.127 km
- Synodic rotation period: 2.613±0.0006 h 2.620±0.010 h
- Geometric albedo: 0.24 (assumed); 0.349±0.036
- Spectral type: S · LS
- Absolute magnitude (H): 14.4 · 14.490±0.050 (R) · 14.565±0.001 (R) · 14.6 · 14.97±0.27 · 15.01

7846 Setvák, provisional designation 1996 BJ, is a stony Flora asteroid from the inner regions of the asteroid belt, approximately 3 kilometers in diameter. It was discovered on 16 January 1996, by Czech astronomer Miloš Tichý at Kleť Observatory in South Bohemia. The asteroid was named for Czech couple Stáňa and Martin Setvák.

== Orbit and classification ==
Setvák is a member of the Flora family, one of the largest groups of stony asteroids in the main-belt. It orbits the Sun in the inner main-belt at a distance of 1.9–2.8 AU once every 3 years and 7 months (1,315 days). Its orbit has an eccentricity of 0.18 and an inclination of 3° with respect to the ecliptic. Its observation arc dates back to 1979, due to precoveries obtained at the U.S. Palomar Observatory and the Siding Spring Observatory in Australia.

== Physical characteristics ==
=== Diameter and albedo ===
According to the survey carried out by the NEOWISE mission of NASA's Wide-field Infrared Survey Explorer, the asteroid measures 3.0 kilometers in diameter and its surface has a high albedo of 0.35, while the Collaborative Asteroid Lightcurve Link assumes an albedo of 0.24 (in accordance with the family's largest member and namesake, 8 Flora) and calculates a diameter of 2.7 kilometers. A large-scale survey by Pan-STARRS (PS1) assigns an LS-type, presumably an intermediary spectral type between the common stony S-types and the rather rare and reddish L-type asteroids.

=== Rotation period ===
Two rotational lightcurves were obtained from photometric observations taken in the R-band at the U.S. Palomar Transient Factory in January 2014. The lightcurves gave a rotation period of 2.613 and 2.610 hours with a brightness amplitude of 0.11 and 0.14 in magnitude, respectively (U=2/2).

== Naming ==
This minor planet was named for Czech meteorologist Martin Setvák (born 1958), amateur astrophotographer and head of the Satellite Department of the Czech Hydrometeorological Institute, to honor his 40th birthday, as well as for his wife Stáňa Setváková (born 1967), a staff member of the Prague Planetarium. The official naming citation was published by the Minor Planet Center on 11 February 1998 (M.P.C. 31298).
