= 14974 Počátky =

Main-belt asteroid

Discovery
- Discovered by: M. Tichý
- Discovery site: Kleť Obs.
- Discovery date: 22 September 1997

Designations
- Named after: Počátky (Czech town)
- Alternative designations: 1997 SK_{1} · 1991 FF_{2}
- Minor planet category: main-belt · (middle) background

Orbital characteristics
- Epoch 4 September 2017 (JD 2458000.5)
- Uncertainty parameter 0
- Observation arc: 26.13 yr (9,543 days)
- Aphelion: 2.8575 AU
- Perihelion: 2.4047 AU
- Semi-major axis: 2.6311 AU
- Eccentricity: 0.0860
- Orbital period (sidereal): 4.27 yr (1,559 days)
- Mean anomaly: 100.11°
- Mean motion: 0° 13^{m} 51.24^{s} / day
- Inclination: 3.8704°
- Longitude of ascending node: 338.42°
- Argument of perihelion: 158.25°

Physical characteristics
- Dimensions: 4.040±0.831 km 4.88 km (calculated)
- Synodic rotation period: 21.7079±0.0320 h 21.7277±0.0320 h
- Geometric albedo: 0.10 (assumed); 0.226±0.100
- Spectral type: S
- Absolute magnitude (H): 14.2 · 14.225±0.009 (R) · 14.226±0.005 (R) · 14.43±0.19 · 14.67

14974 Počátky, provisional designation 1997 SK_{1}, is a stony background asteroid from the middle region of the asteroid belt, approximately 4 kilometers in diameter. It was discovered by Czech astronomer Miloš Tichý at Kleť Observatory in the Czech Republic on 22 September 1997, and named for the Czech town Počátky.

== Classification and orbit ==
Počátky is a stony S-type asteroid, that orbits the Sun in the middle main-belt at a distance of 2.4–2.9 AU once every 4 years and 3 months (1,559 days). Its orbit has an eccentricity of 0.09 and an inclination of 4° with respect to the ecliptic. A first precovery was taken at ESO's La Silla Observatory in 1991, extending the asteroid's observation arc by 6 years prior to its discovery.

== Physical characteristics ==
Two rotational lightcurves for this asteroid were obtained from photometric observations made at the U.S Palomar Transient Factory, California, in August 2010 and February 2012. The lightcurves gave a rotation period of 21.7277±0.0320 and 21.7079±0.0320 hours with a brightness amplitude of 0.57 and 0.68 in magnitude, respectively (U=2/2).

According to the survey carried out by the NEOWISE mission of NASA's space-based Wide-field Infrared Survey Explorer, Počátky measures 4.0 kilometers in diameter and its surface has an albedo of 0.23, while the Collaborative Asteroid Lightcurve Link (CALL) assumes an untypically low albedo for stony asteroids of 0.10, and thus calculates a larger diameter of 4.9 kilometers.

== Naming ==
This minor planet was named after the south Bohemian town of Počátky, Czech Republic. It is the birthplace of the discoverer Miloš Tichý. The approved naming citation was published by the Minor Planet Center on 11 November 2000 (M.P.C. 41572).
