= Lavičky =

- Municipality
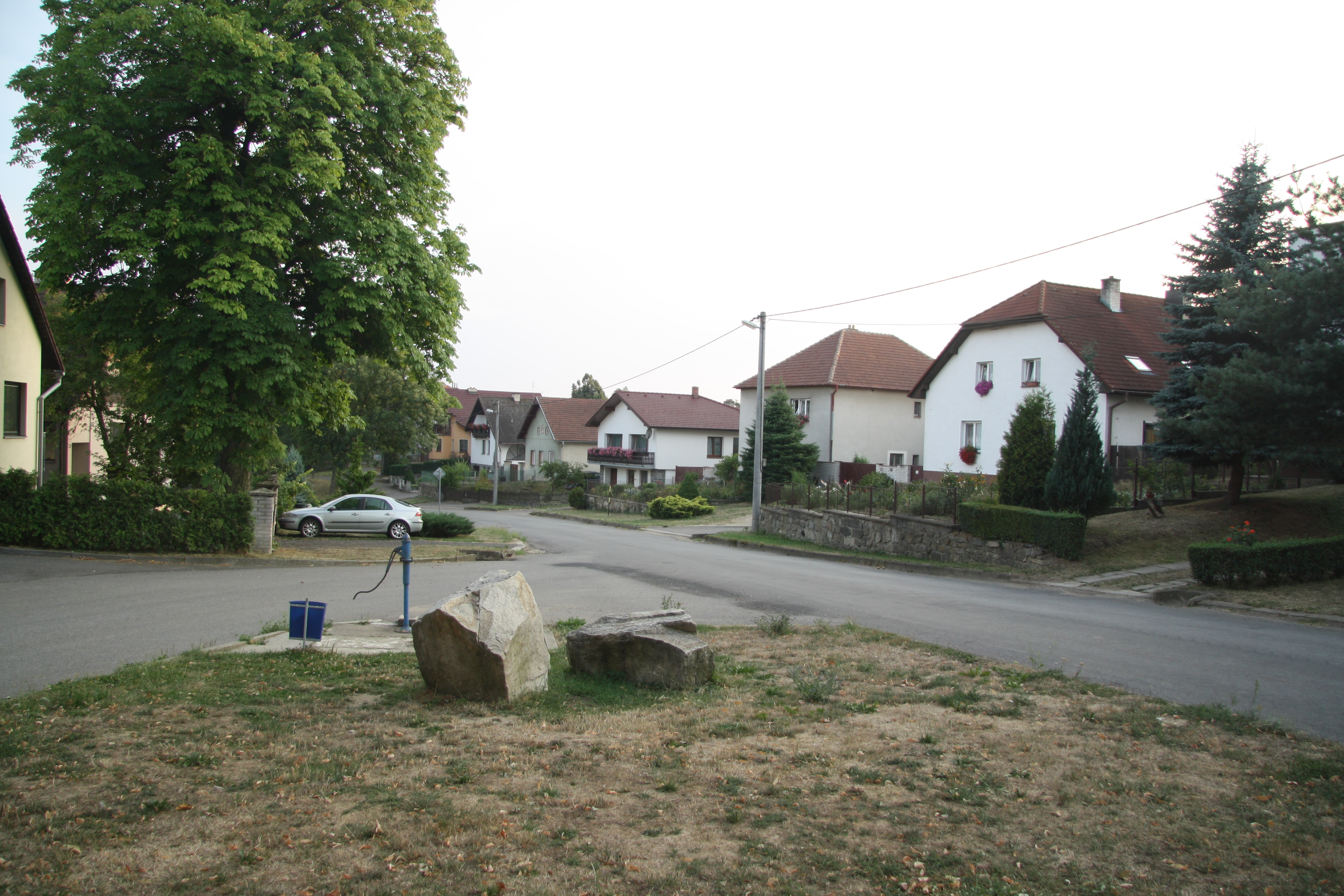
- Centre of Lavičky

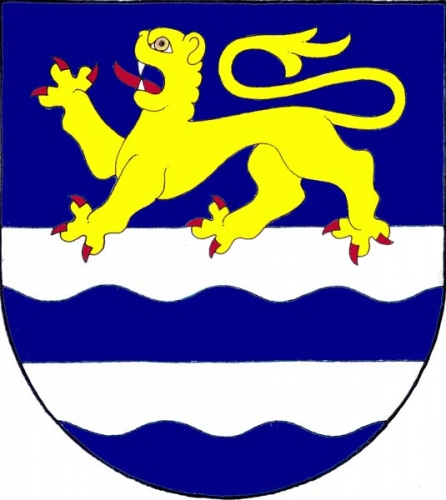
- Flag Coat of arms

- Location in the Czech Republic
- Coordinates: 49°22′50″N 15°58′6″E
- Country: Czech Republic
- Region: Vysočina
- District: Žďár nad Sázavou
- First mentioned: 1366

Area
  - Total: 5.73 km^{2} (2.21 sq mi)
- Elevation: 518 m (1,699 ft)

Population (2026-01-01)
  - Total: 725
  - Density: 127/km^{2} (328/sq mi)
- Time zone: UTC+1 (CET)
  - Summer (DST): UTC+2 (CEST)
- Postal code: 594 01
- Website: www.obec-lavicky.cz

Lavičky is a municipality and village in Žďár nad Sázavou District in the Vysočina Region of the Czech Republic. It has about 700 inhabitants.

Lavičky lies approximately 21 kilometres (13 mi) south of Žďár nad Sázavou, 28 kilometres (17 mi) east of Jihlava, and 137 kilometres (85 mi) south-east of Prague.

== Administrative division ==
Lavičky consists of two municipal parts (in brackets population according to the 2021 census):

- Lavičky (527)
- Závist (88)

== Demographics ==
Historical population
Year	Pop.	±%
1869	435	—
1880	434	−0.2%
1890	418	−3.7%
1900	424	+1.4%
1910	450	+6.1%
1921	438	−2.7%
1930	456	+4.1%
1950	428	−6.1%
1961	424	−0.9%
1970	406	−4.2%
1980	390	−3.9%
1991	392	+0.5%
2001	408	+4.1%
2011	485	+18.9%
2021	615	+26.8%
Source: Censuses
