= Levín =

- Market town
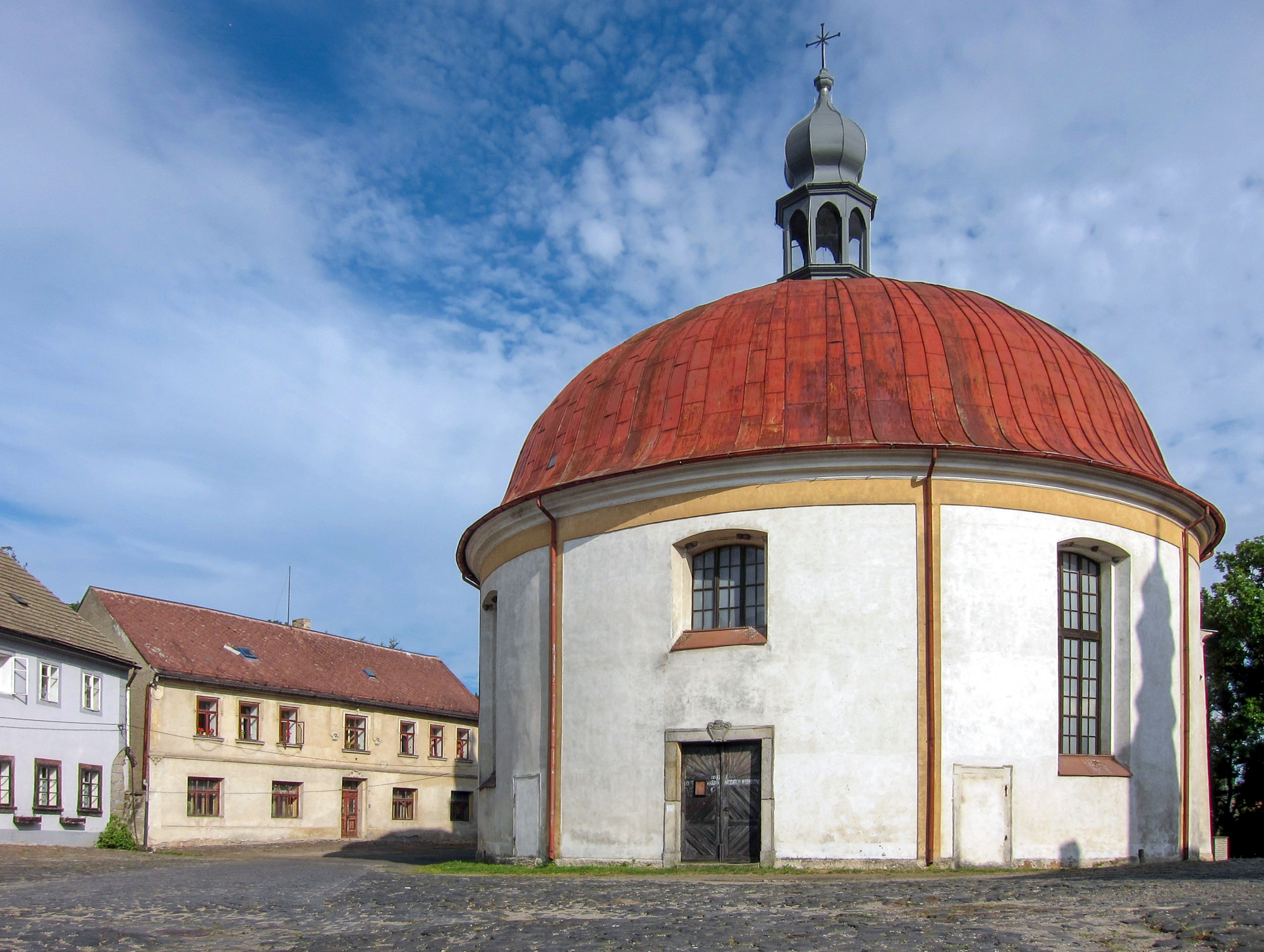
- Church of the Exaltation of the Holy Cross

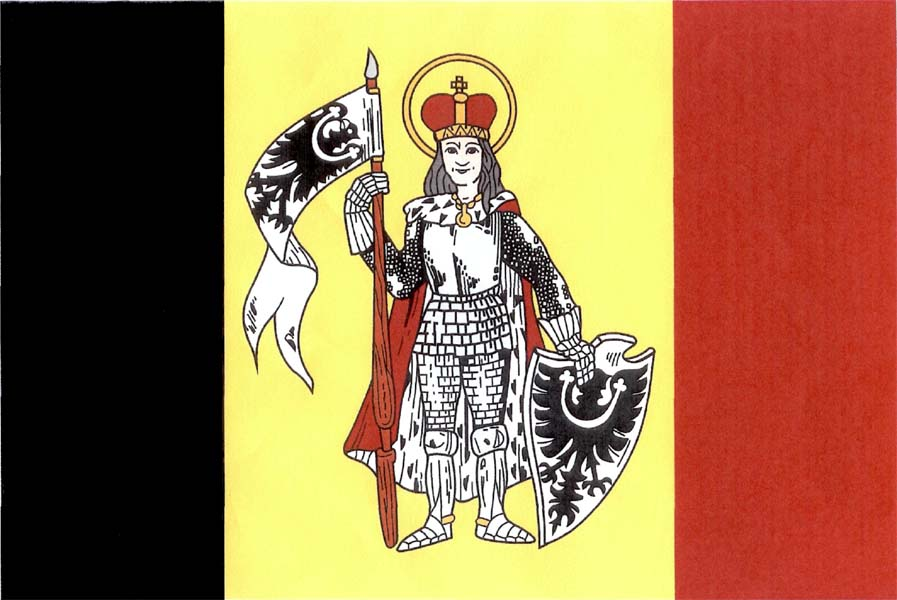
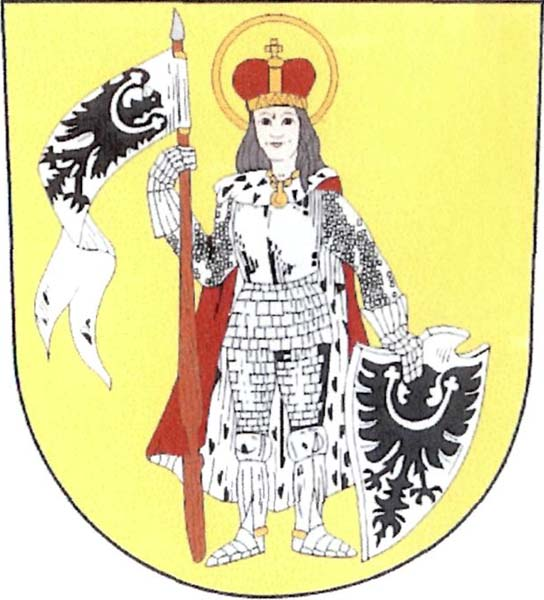
- Flag Coat of arms

- Location in the Czech Republic
- Coordinates: 50°36′50″N 14°17′2″E
- Country: Czech Republic
- Region: Ústí nad Labem
- District: Litoměřice
- First mentioned: 1352

Area
  - Total: 4.90 km^{2} (1.89 sq mi)
- Elevation: 438 m (1,437 ft)

Population (2026-01-01)
  - Total: 160
  - Density: 33/km^{2} (85/sq mi)
- Time zone: UTC+1 (CET)
  - Summer (DST): UTC+2 (CEST)
- Postal code: 411 45
- Website: www.mestyslevin.cz

Levín (Czech pronunciation: [ˈlɛviːn]; German: Lewin) is a market town in Litoměřice District in the Ústí nad Labem Region of the Czech Republic. It has about 200 inhabitants.

== Administrative division ==
Levín consists of two municipal parts (in brackets population according to the 2021 census):

- Levín (124)
- Horní Vysoké (22)

== Etymology ==
The name is derived from the personal name Lev, meaning "Lev's (castle, court)".

== Geography ==
Levín is located about 13 kilometres (8 mi) northeast of Litoměřice and 18 km (11 mi) east of Ústí nad Labem. It lies in the Central Bohemian Uplands and within the České středohoří Protected Landscape Area. The highest point is a nameless hill at 559 m (1,834 ft) above sea level.

== History ==
The first written mention of Levín is from 1352. At the turn of the 13th and 14th centuries, during the rule of Václav of Vartenberk, Levín was promoted to a market town. In 1402 at the latest, the potters' guild was founded in Levín. The town was known for pottery until the beginning of the 20th century, when the supply of good quality clay was exhausted. It was the only place in the country with such long continuous production.

There was a climatic spa in Horní Vysoké. It was founded in the first third of the 19th century, but ceased to exist during World War II.

== Demographics ==
Historical population

Year	Pop.	±%
1869	1,235	—
1880	1,158	−6.2%
1890	1,085	−6.3%
1900	957	−11.8%
1910	876	−8.5%

Year	Pop.	±%
1921	847	−3.3%
1930	843	−0.5%
1950	326	−61.3%
1961	313	−4.0%
1970	237	−24.3%

Year	Pop.	±%
1980	157	−33.8%
1991	92	−41.4%
2001	97	+5.4%
2011	123	+26.8%
2021	146	+18.7%

Source: Censuses

== Transport ==
There are no railways or major roads passing through the municipality.

== Sights ==
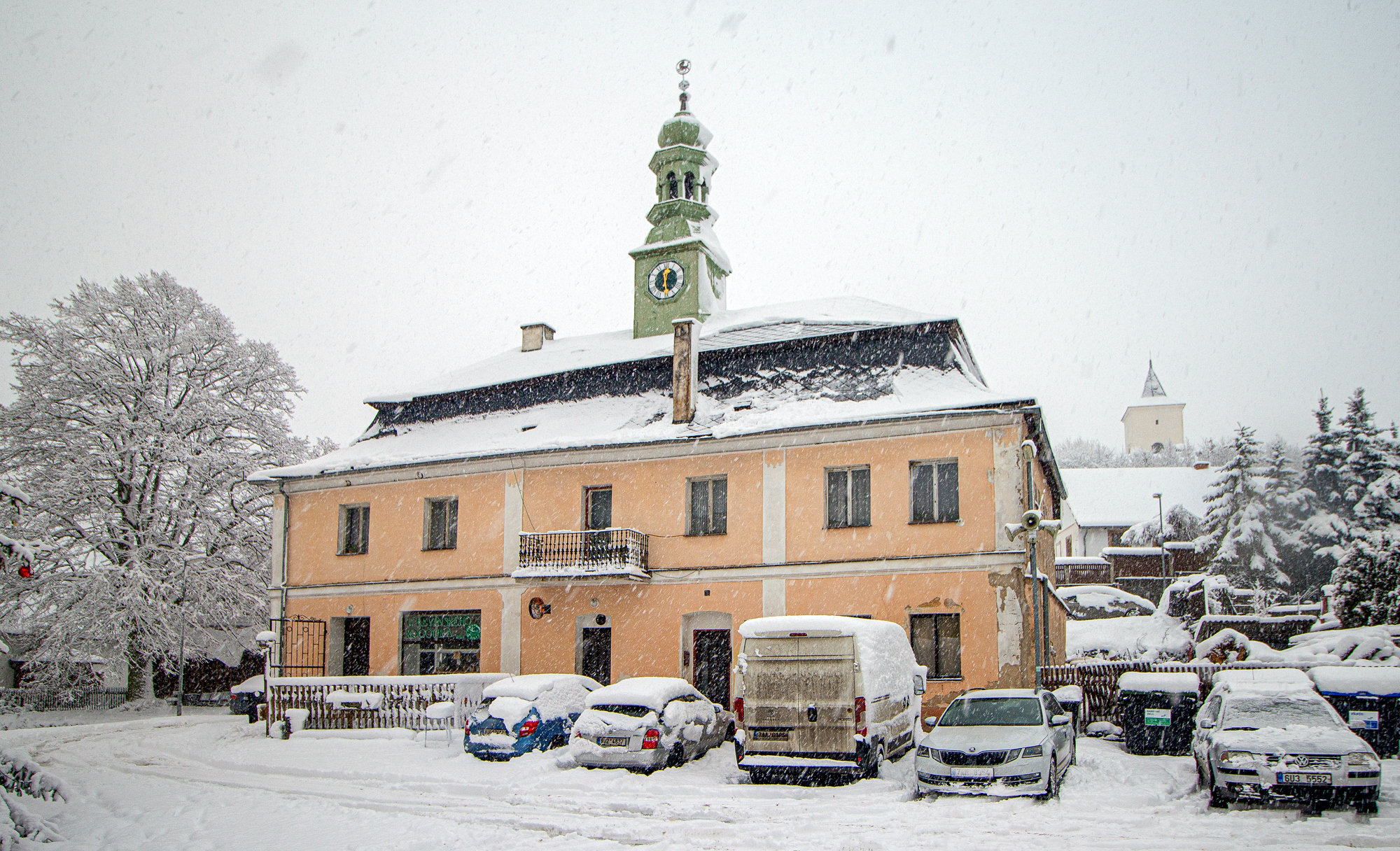
Former town hall

The main landmark of Levín is the Church of the Exaltation of the Holy Cross. It was built in the late Baroque style in 1788. After the fire in 1791, it was rebuilt in 1798. The Baroque rotunda of the church is supposed to resemble a potter's wheel and thus reminds of the tradition of this craft in Levín.

A notable building is the former town hall. It was built in the late Baroque and Neoclassical styles in 1793.

The ruin of the Levín Castle is located on a hill above Levín. It was built in the 13th century or at the beginning of the 14th century. In the 1420s, during the Hussite Wars, the castle was destroyed. In 1699, a bell tower was built next to the ruins using material from the castle. From the ruins, only the relics of the fortress wall have survived to this day.

== Notable people ==
- Wilfried Hanke (1901–?), German violinist
