= Obec =

Czech and Slovak word for a municipality

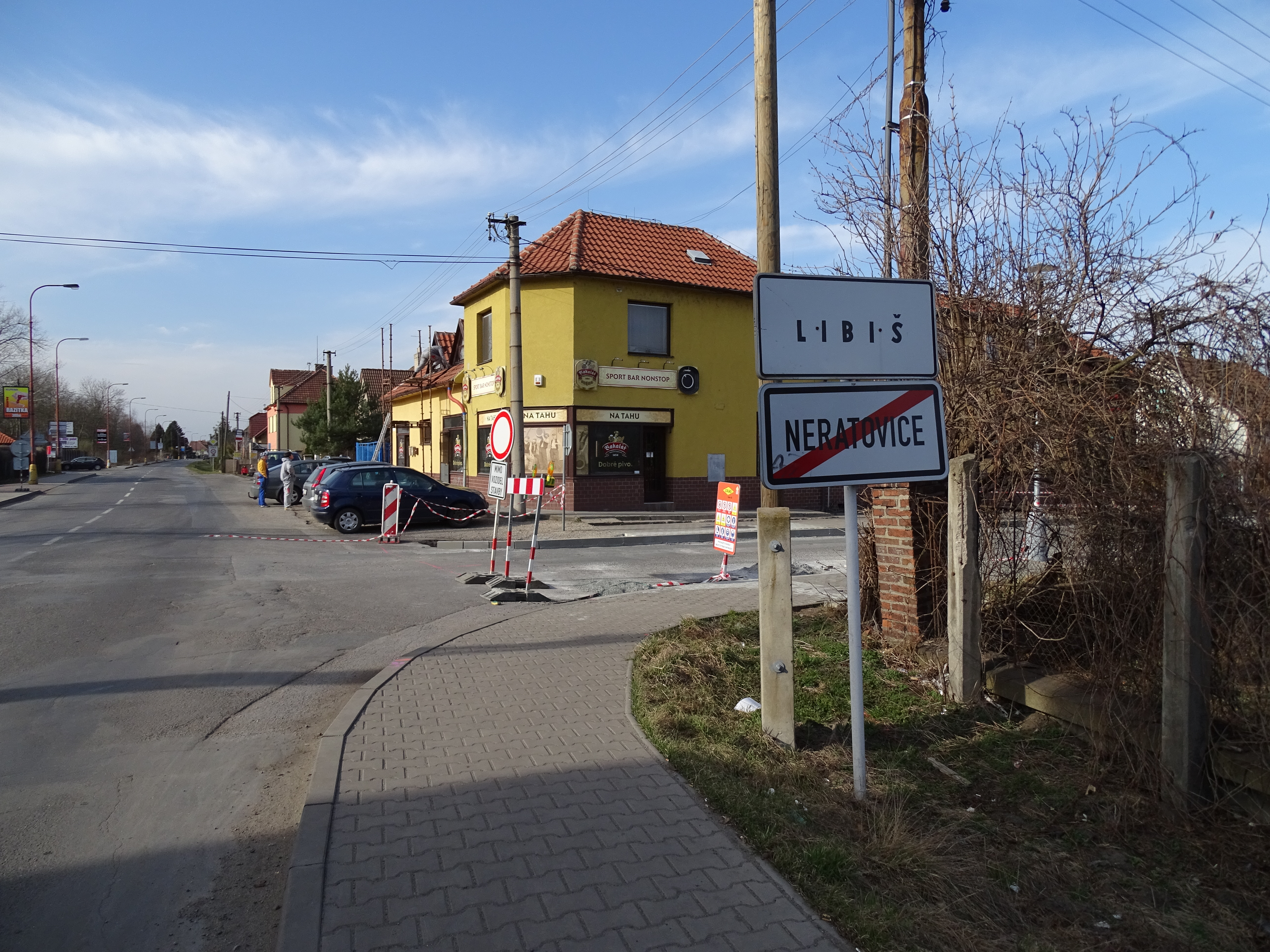
Signs showing the border of two municipalities

Obec (Czech: [ˈobɛts], Slovak: [ˈɔbets]; plural obce) is the Czech and Slovak word for a municipality (in the Czech Republic, in Slovakia and abroad). The literal meaning of the word is "commune" or "community". It is the smallest administrative unit that is governed by elected representatives. Cities and towns are also municipalities.

== Definition ==
The legal definition (according to the Czech code of law with similar definition in the Slovak code of law) is: "The municipality is a basic territorial self-governing community of citizens; it forms a territorial unit, which is defined by the boundary of the municipality."

Every municipality is composed of one or more cadastral areas. Every municipality is also composed of one or more municipal parts (Czech: části obce), which are usually town quarters or villages. A municipality can have its own flag and coat of arms.

== Czech Republic ==
Almost the entire area of the Czech Republic is divided into municipalities, with the only exception being military training areas. The smaller municipalities consist only of one village. A municipality usually has the same name as its most populous settlement, which usually contains the municipal office. However there are several exceptions, for example municipalities created by mergers of formerly separate municipalities (such as Brandýs nad Labem-Stará Boleslav and Orlické Podhůří).

A municipality can obtain the title of a city (statutární město), town (město) or market town (městys). While all of these are municipalities from the point of view of the law, they are usually referred to by their titles and not as municipalities. Municipalities without any other status are just called municipalities. Statutory cities can have self-governing subdivision known as city parts or city districts (městská část), which are somewhat similar to municipalities in that they have their own town halls and local government. Town and market town are above all ceremonial labels bestowed on municipalities with notable population, history and regional significance.

A special type of municipality is the capital Prague, which has simultaneously the status of a municipality and a region, and which is treated by special law.

The law makes it possible for municipalities which were stripped of town status during the Communist period to retain that status automatically. For any other municipality to gain town status, it must have population over 3,000 and must pass an assessment by the chairman of the parliament. For market town status, population is not a condition. The newest Czech town is Chýně, which obtained the status in 2023.

Some municipalities have extended competencies of delegated state administration for the territory of the municipality and for surrounding municipalities.

=== Statistics ===
Count of municipalities by category of population (as of January 2026)
	Total	Cities	Towns	Market towns	Other municipalities
Over 99,999	6	6	–	–	–
50,000–99,999	12	12	–	–	–
25,000–49,999	20	9	11	–	–
10,000–24,999	94	–	94	–	–
5,000–9,999	143	–	139	–	4
2,500–4,999	283	–	181	7	95
1,000–2,499	981	–	128	114	739
500–999	1,383	–	18	90	1,275
Under 500	3,332	–	12	23	3,297
Total	6,254	27	583	234	5,410

Population in municipalities by status (as of January 2026)
	Total	Cities	Towns	Market towns	Other municipalities
Average	1,745	139,140	6,390	1,187	583
Median	457	63,160	4,157	1,052	384
Minimum	16	33,523 (Třinec)	67 (Přebuz)	160 (Levín)	16 (Vysoká Lhota)
Maximum	1,407,084	1,407,084 (Prague)	36,364 (Česká Lípa)	4,528 (Nehvizdy)	5,586 (Horoměřice)
Total	10,915,839	3,756,773	3,725,601	277,811	3,155,654

The smallest municipalities by area are Závist (0.42 km^{2}) and Strukov (0.53 km^{2}). The biggest are the cities of Prague (496.21 km^{2}), Brno (230.18 km^{2}) and Ostrava (214.23 km^{2}), and the town of Ralsko (170.23 km^{2}, including a former military area, with only about 2,000 inhabitants).

== Slovakia ==
As of 2020, there are 2,890 municipalities in Slovakia, with 141 of them being a city or a town.

After meeting certain conditions such as population over 5,000, being well accessible, having cultural or economical significance and having an urban style of settlement, a municipality can be declared a town (mesto).

== See also ==
- okres
- opština
