= 7440 Závist =

Asteroid

Discovery
- Discovered by: M. Tichý
- Discovery site: Kleť Obs.
- Discovery date: 1 March 1995

Designations
- Named after: Oppidum Závist (Celtic oppidum)
- Alternative designations: 1995 EA · 1980 PL_{4}
- Minor planet category: main-belt · (middle)

Orbital characteristics
- Epoch 4 September 2017 (JD 2458000.5)
- Uncertainty parameter 0
- Observation arc: 35.94 yr (13,128 days)
- Aphelion: 3.0137 AU
- Perihelion: 2.1599 AU
- Semi-major axis: 2.5868 AU
- Eccentricity: 0.1650
- Orbital period (sidereal): 4.16 yr (1,520 days)
- Mean anomaly: 185.65°
- Mean motion: 0° 14^{m} 12.84^{s} / day
- Inclination: 10.967°
- Longitude of ascending node: 147.88°
- Argument of perihelion: 319.65°

Physical characteristics
- Dimensions: 5.05±0.61 km 5.07 km (calculated)
- Synodic rotation period: 7.4365±0.0023 h
- Geometric albedo: 0.20 (assumed); 0.363±0.094
- Spectral type: S
- Absolute magnitude (H): 13.4 · 13.84 · 13.2 · 13.390±0.005 (R) · 13.73±0.36

7440 Závist, provisional designation 1995 EA, is a stony asteroid from the middle region of the asteroid belt, approximately 5 kilometers in diameter. It was discovered on 1 March 1995, by Czech astronomer Miloš Tichý at Kleť Observatory in South Bohemia. The asteroid was named for the Celtic Oppidum Závist.

== Orbit and classification ==
Závist orbits the Sun in the central main-belt at a distance of 2.2–3.0 AU once every 4 years and 2 months (1,520 days). Its orbit has an eccentricity of 0.17 and an inclination of 11° with respect to the ecliptic. The first precovery was taken at Palomar Observatory in 1980, extending the asteroid's observation arc by 15 years prior to its discovery.

== Physical characteristics ==
=== Rotation period ===
A rotational lightcurve was obtained from photometric observations made at the U.S. Palomar Transient Factory in September 2010. It gave a rotation period of 7.4365±0.0023 hours with a brightness amplitude of 0.55 in magnitude (U=2).

=== Diameter and albedo ===
According to the survey carried out by NASA's Wide-field Infrared Survey Explorer with its subsequent NEOWISE mission, Závist measures 5.05 kilometers in diameter and its surface has an exceptionally high albedo of 0.363±0.094. The Collaborative Asteroid Lightcurve Link assumes a standard albedo for stony asteroids of 0.20 and calculates a nearly identical diameter of 5.07 kilometers with an absolute magnitude of 13.84.

== Naming ==
This minor planet was named for the Oppidum Závist (Oppidum Závist), a Celtic settlement south of Prague in Bohemia.

The ancient ruins are located on a hill above Vltava river (also see the minor planets 2367 Praha and 2123 Vltava). The site consists of two parts named "Hradiště" and "Šance". The settlement existed between the 6th century BC and 1st century AD, and represents part of the most outstanding remnants of known Celtic history in the Czech Republic, especially its ramparts and moats, as well as its acropolis. The official naming citation was published by the Minor Planet Center on 4 May 1999 (M.P.C. 34625).
