= Závist (Blansko District) =

- Municipality
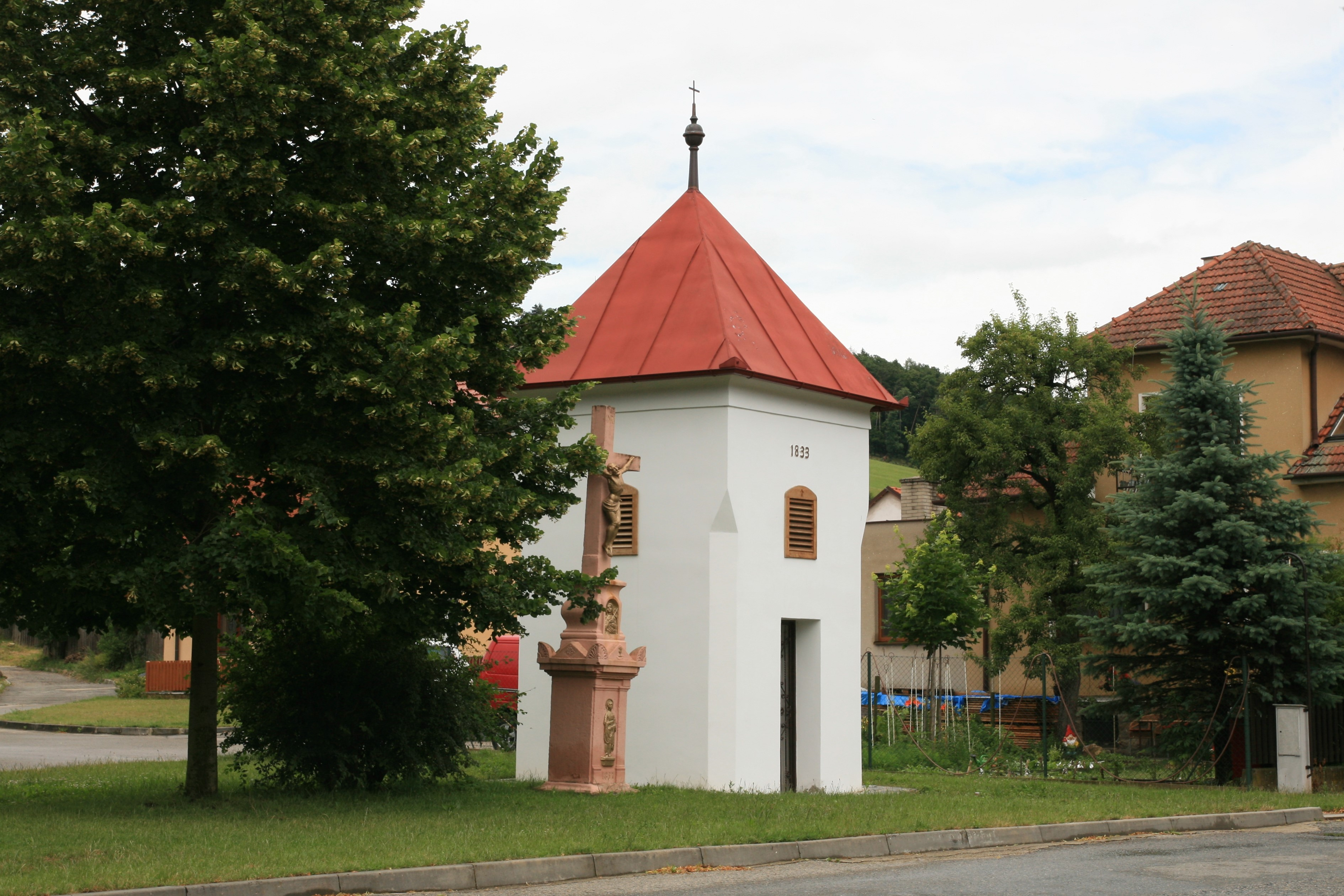
- Belfry and cross in the centre of Závist

- Flag Coat of arms

- Location in the Czech Republic
- Coordinates: 49°22′31″N 16°34′19″E
- Country: Czech Republic
- Region: South Moravian
- District: Blansko
- Founded: 1776

Area
  - Total: 0.42 km^{2} (0.16 sq mi)
- Elevation: 370 m (1,210 ft)

Population (2026-01-01)
  - Total: 154
  - Density: 370/km^{2} (950/sq mi)
- Time zone: UTC+1 (CET)
  - Summer (DST): UTC+2 (CEST)
- Postal code: 679 22
- Website: www.obeczavist.cz

Závist is a municipality and village in Blansko District in the South Moravian Region of the Czech Republic. It has about 200 inhabitants. Závist is the smallest municipality in the country by area.

== Geography ==
Závist is located about 5 kilometres (3 mi) west of Blansko and 18 km (11 mi) north of Brno. The southern part of the municipality with the built-up area lies in the northern tip of the Bobrava Highlands and the northern part lies in the Drahany Highlands. The highest point is at 475 m (1,558 ft) above sea level.

With an area of 0.42 km^{2} (0.16 sq mi), Závist is the smallest municipality in the country.

== History ==
Závist was founded in 1776.

== Demographics ==
Historical population

Year	Pop.	±%
1869	124	—
1880	139	+12.1%
1890	145	+4.3%
1900	153	+5.5%
1910	161	+5.2%

Year	Pop.	±%
1921	153	−5.0%
1930	161	+5.2%
1950	149	−7.5%
1961	181	+21.5%
1970	148	−18.2%

Year	Pop.	±%
1980	148	+0.0%
1991	127	−14.2%
2001	138	+8.7%
2011	142	+2.9%
2021	143	+0.7%

Source: Censuses

== Transport ==
The I/43 road (part of European route E461), which connects Brno with Svitavy, runs through Závist.

== Sights ==
There are no protected cultural monuments in the municipality. The main landmark of Závist is a belfry from 1833. Next to the belfry is a cross from 1857.
