= Meanings of minor-planet names: 95001–96000 =

As minor planet discoveries are confirmed, they are given a permanent number by the IAU's Minor Planet Center (MPC), and the discoverers can then submit names for them, following the IAU's naming conventions. The list below concerns those minor planets in the specified number-range that have received names, and explains the meanings of those names.

Official naming citations of newly named small Solar System bodies are approved and published in a bulletin by IAU's Working Group for Small Bodies Nomenclature (WGSBN). Before May 2021, citations were published in MPC's Minor Planet Circulars for many decades. Recent citations can also be found on the JPL Small-Body Database (SBDB). Until his death in 2016, German astronomer Lutz D. Schmadel compiled these citations into the Dictionary of Minor Planet Names (DMP) and regularly updated the collection.

Based on Paul Herget's The Names of the Minor Planets, Schmadel also researched the unclear origin of numerous asteroids, most of which had been named prior to World War II. This article incorporates text from this source, which is in the public domain: SBDB New namings may only be added to this list below after official publication as the preannouncement of names is condemned. The WGSBN publishes a comprehensive guideline for the naming rules of non-cometary small Solar System bodies.

== 95001–95100 ==
Named minor planet	Provisional	This minor planet was named for...	Ref · Catalog
95008 Ivanobertini	2002 AH_{1}	Ivano Bertini (born 1968), Italian astronomer and active member of the Asiago-DLR Asteroid Survey, is collaborating in the planning of observations using the OSIRIS two-camera system on board the European Space Agency's Rosetta mission. His main research field is the study of the dust environment in comets.	JPL · 95008
95016 Kimjeongho	2002 AA_{9}	Gim Jeong-ho (1804–1866), Korean geographer and cartographer in the early 19th century whose works represented a culmination in Korea's map-making history. The publication of three maps and three topographies is his greatest achievements.	JPL · 95016
95020 Nencini	2002 AV_{12}	Erica Nencini (born 1974) earned her economics degree at the University of Pisa and is presently the CFO of SpaceDyS, a company in the aerospace sector.	JPL · 95020
95024 Ericaellingson	2002 AH_{18}	Erica Ellingson (born 1962), astronomer at the University of Colorado Boulder. She is an observational cosmologist, studying the origin, content and evolution of the Universe. Her speciality is clusters of galaxies, held together by the gravity of invisible dark matter.	JPL · 95024
95072 ČVUT	2002 AW_{66}	The Czech Technical University in Prague (ČVUT, České vysoké učení technické) is one of the biggest and oldest technical universities in Europe. It was established at the initiative of Josef Christian Willenberg in 1707. Currently it has eight faculties, about 18 000 students, and its own nuclear reactor.	IAU · 95072

== 95101–95200 ==
back to top

Named minor planet	Provisional	This minor planet was named for...	Ref · Catalog
95179 Berkó	2002 BO	Ernő Berkó (born 1955), a Hungarian amateur astronomer interested in deep-sky objects and double stars. He is an independent discoverer of the supernova 1999by, and as of Oct. 2006 the Washington Double Star Catalog contains over 160 double stars discovered by him.	JPL · 95179

== 95201–95300 ==
back to top

Named minor planet	Provisional	This minor planet was named for...	Ref · Catalog
95219 Borgman	2002 CT_{14}	Dennis Borgman (born 1952), an American machinist, carpenter, electrician, plumber, programmer, and amateur astronomer, actively involved with the George Observatory and the Fort Bend Astronomy Club.	JPL · 95219
95247 Schalansky	2002 CH_{52}	Judith Schalansky (born 1980) is a German writer. She has degrees in both History of Art and Communication Design. Her book Atlas of Remote Islands was the winner of The German Arts Foundation Prize for the Most Beautiful Book of The Year., German writer	JPL · 95247

== 95301–95400 ==
back to top

Named minor planet	Provisional	This minor planet was named for...	Ref · Catalog
There are no named minor planets in this number range

== 95401–95500 ==
back to top

Named minor planet	Provisional	This minor planet was named for...	Ref · Catalog
95449 Frederickgregory	2002 CJ_{261}	Frederick D. Gregory (born 1941) is a retired American astronaut who was the pilot on one space shuttle mission and commander on two other missions. In 1989, he was the first African American to command a space flight. He also served as Deputy Administrator at NASA.	JPL · 95449
95474 Andreajbarbieri	2002 EE_{4}	Andrea J. Barbieri (born 1969), was born in the United States and educated as a telecom engineer in Italy. He worked at JPL on the UHF systems of the Mars Odyssey and Mars Explorations Rovers, and is now involved with navigation and telecommunication satellites in England. He is the recipient of NASA and ESA group awards.	JPL · 95474

== 95501–95600 ==
back to top

Named minor planet	Provisional	This minor planet was named for...	Ref · Catalog
95593 Azusienis	2002 FU_{10}	Algimantas Azusienis (1930–2021), a Lithuanian astronomer and teacher for 50 years at the Vilnius Pedagogical University, has investigated the variable stars and the photometric systems. With V. Straizys he improved the determination of the response curves and parameters of the UBV system.	JPL · 95593

== 95601–95700 ==
back to top

Named minor planet	Provisional	This minor planet was named for...	Ref · Catalog
There are no named minor planets in this number range

== 95701–95800 ==
back to top

Named minor planet	Provisional	This minor planet was named for...	Ref · Catalog
95760 Protezionecivile	2003 EF_{41}	The people of the Protezione Civile, the Italian Civil Protection Department, who played an essential role in the 2020 Corona pandemic in Italy. Established in 1992, the department's responsibilities include the prevention and management of emergency events such as natural disasters.	IAU · 95760
95771 Lachat	2003 EZ_{49}	Damien Lachat (born 1977) is an electronics engineer who works at the Swiss Federal Office of Metrology and an amateur astronomer in Jura. He is one of the founders of the Observatoire Astronomique Jurassien, near Vicques.	JPL · 95771
95782 Hansgraf	2003 FS_{3}	Hans Graf (born 1949), an Austrian conductor who has directed the Houston Symphony since 2001 and has played a pivotal role in shaping the institution. He is known for his wide-ranging repertoire and creative programming.	JPL · 95782
95783 Marceloemilio	2003 FJ_{6}	Marcelo Emilio (b. 1971), a Brazilian astronomer.	IAU · 95783
95785 Csányivilmos	2003 FV_{6}	Vilmos Csányi (born 1935) is a Hungarian biologist, biochemist, ethologist and a member of the Hungarian Academy of Sciences. His main field of research is human and animal behavior, and the questions of biological and cultural evolution. He is a very active science communicator, and the author of numerous literary novels.	JPL · 95785
95793 Brock	2003 FR_{20}	Brad Brock (born 1955) is a manager with IBM Information Technology and Services. He has also been very active in local Boy Scouts of America activities in the Tucson, Arizona, area	JPL · 95793

== 95801–95900 ==
back to top

Named minor planet	Provisional	This minor planet was named for...	Ref · Catalog
95802 Francismuir	2003 FM_{42}	Francis Muir (born 1926), British-American mentor and advisor of the discoverer, Joseph A. Dellinger. He has demonstrated a deft touch over seemingly endless years of applying a variety of modern mathematical notions to the simple and practical solution of problems in the earth sciences.	JPL · 95802
95824 Elger	2003 FP_{85}	Thomas Gwyn Empy Elger (1836–1897) was a British selenographer who was the first Director of the Lunar Section of the British Astronomical Association. His book The Moon (1895) is considered a classic lunar observing guide for the amateur astronomers of that time.	JPL · 95824
95851 Stromvil	2003 FD_{123}	The Stromvil photometric system, established in 1996 by V. Straizys, D. L. Crawford and A. G. Davis Philip as a combination of the Strömgren and Vilnius photometric systems, permits the classification of stars of all types on the basis of photometric measurements alone.	JPL · 95851
95852 Leatherbarrow	2003 FT_{127}	Bill Leatherbarrow (born 1947) is professor emeritus at the University of Sheffield. He was awarded an honorary doctorate for services to amateur astronomy. He served as British Astronomical Association President from 2011 to 2013, and has been BAA Lunar Section Director since 2009.	JPL · 95852
95853 Jamescarpenter	2003 FU_{127}	James Carpenter (1840–1899), was a British astronomer known for his work on stellar spectra and planets. He co-authored "The Moon: Considered as a Planet, a World, and a Satellite" with James Nasmyth.	JPL · 95853
95882 Longshaw	2003 HW	Nigel Longshaw (born 1963) is a committee member of the British Astronomical Association Lunar Section and contributes to the Section Circulars. His papers have appeared in the BAA Journal and observations published in Observing the Moon by North, Observing the Moon by Wlasuk and Moon Observers Guide by Grego.	JPL · 95882
95895 Sebastiano	2003 HF_{12}	Sebastiano Foglia (born 2010) is the son of Italian amateur astronomer Sergio Foglia, who co-discovered this minor planet.	IAU · 95895

== 95901–96000 ==
back to top

Named minor planet	Provisional	This minor planet was named for...	Ref · Catalog
95928 Tonycook	2003 JO_{13}	Tony Cook (born 1962) is the British Astronomical Association and Association of Lunar and Planetary Observers Coordinator for Transient Lunar Phenomena. He also worked on the Mariner 10 imagery and the Clementine digital topographic map that was used during the planning of the impact of ESA's SMART-1.	JPL · 95928
95935 Grego	2003 KU_{8}	Peter Grego (born 1966) is a British amateur astronomer and author of many books on observational astronomy. He currently serves as assistant director of the British Astronomical Association's Lunar Section.	JPL · 95935
95939 Thagnesland	2003 KL_{20}	Thaddeus Vreeland (1866–1927) and Agnes Vreeland (1877–1961), maternal grandparents of the American discoverer James W. Young	JPL · 95939
95951 Ernestopalomba	2003 QG_{6}	Ernesto Palomba (born 1967), an Italian planetary scientist at INAF-IAPS and discoverer of minor planets	JPL · 95951
95954 Bayzoltán	2003 QQ_{29}	Zoltán Lajos Bay (1900–1992) was a Hungarian physicist, university professor and engineer who developed microwave technology, including tungsten lamps. He was the president of the department of nuclear physics in the National Bureau of Standards and also an honorary member of the Hungarian Academy of Sciences	JPL · 95954
95955 Claragianni	2003 QX_{32}	Clara Cagnacci (born 1933) and Giannantonio Palomba (1932–2015), the parents of the Italian discoverer Ernesto Palomba	JPL · 95955
95959 Covadonga	2003 SU_{224}	Covadonga Camblor, wife of the Spanish astronomer Juan Lacruz who discovered this minor planet	JPL · 95959
95962 Copito	2003 WZ_{87}	Snowflake (1962–2003) represented the first known case of albinism in gorillas. In a 1967 article about the gorilla, Riopelle and Zahl gave it the name "Snowflake". The name stuck and was translated into Spanish as above and into Catalan as "Floquet de Neu".	JPL · 95962
95980 Haroldhill	2004 LE_{30}	Harold Hill (1920–2005) was a well known selenographer with the British Astronomical Association's Lunar Section and is considered to have been the last of the great visual lunar cartographers. He received the BAA Merlin Medal in 1969 and is best remembered for his seminal 1991 work, Portfolio of Lunar Drawings.	JPL · 95980
95982 Beish	2004 MH_{6}	Jeff Beish (born 1940) has been an avid amateur astronomer since the 1970s, serving in the Mars Section of the Association of Lunar and Planetary Observers (ALPO) from 1981 to 2005. He maintains the WIMP planetary ephemerides software and an excellent Mars website. In 1989 he received the ALPO Walter Haas observing award.	JPL · 95982

back to top

Preceded by 94,001–95,000	Meanings of minor-planet names List of minor planets: 95,001–96,000	Succeeded by 96,001–97,000
