= List of minor planets: 95001–96000 =

The following is a partial list of minor planets, running from minor-planet number 95001 through 96000, inclusive. The primary data for this and other partial lists is based on JPL's "Small-Body Orbital Elements" and data available from the Minor Planet Center. Critical list information is also provided by the MPC, unless otherwise specified from Lowell Observatory. A detailed description of the table's columns and additional sources are given on the main page including a complete list of every page in this series, and a statistical break-up on the dynamical classification of minor planets.

Also see the summary list of all named bodies in numerical and alphabetical order, and the corresponding naming citations for the number range of this particular list. New namings may only be added to this list after official publication, as the preannouncement of names is condemned by the Working Group for Small Bodies Nomenclature of the International Astronomical Union.

Near-Earth obj.	MBA (inner)	MBA (outer)	Centaur
Mars-crosser	MBA (middle)	Jupiter trojan	Trans-Neptunian obj.
Unclassified

== 95001–95100 ==
Designation			Discovery			Properties		Ref
Permanent	Provisional	Named after	Date	Site	Discoverer(s)	Category	Diam.	Ref
95001	2001 YG_{141}	—	December 17, 2001	Palomar	NEAT	V	1.3 km	MPC · JPL
95002	2001 YM_{145}	—	December 17, 2001	Socorro	LINEAR	·	2.8 km	MPC · JPL
95003	2001 YA_{150}	—	December 19, 2001	Palomar	NEAT	·	4.1 km	MPC · JPL
95004	2001 YS_{151}	—	December 19, 2001	Palomar	NEAT	·	2.1 km	MPC · JPL
95005	2001 YY_{154}	—	December 20, 2001	Palomar	NEAT	PHO	2.1 km	MPC · JPL
95006	2002 AQ	—	January 5, 2002	Oizumi	T. Kobayashi	·	1.5 km	MPC · JPL
95007	2002 AR	—	January 5, 2002	Oizumi	T. Kobayashi	NYS	2.4 km	MPC · JPL
95008 Ivanobertini	2002 AH_{1}	Ivanobertini	January 4, 2002	Cima Ekar	ADAS	·	1.5 km	MPC · JPL
95009	2002 AJ_{1}	—	January 4, 2002	Cima Ekar	ADAS	·	2.2 km	MPC · JPL
95010	2002 AR_{1}	—	January 6, 2002	Oizumi	T. Kobayashi	MAS	1.8 km	MPC · JPL
95011	2002 AS_{1}	—	January 6, 2002	Oizumi	T. Kobayashi	·	2.4 km	MPC · JPL
95012	2002 AT_{1}	—	January 6, 2002	Oizumi	T. Kobayashi	NYS	2.0 km	MPC · JPL
95013	2002 AU_{1}	—	January 6, 2002	Oizumi	T. Kobayashi	MAS	2.2 km	MPC · JPL
95014	2002 AL_{3}	—	January 4, 2002	Needville	A. Cruz, P. G. A. Garossino	·	2.8 km	MPC · JPL
95015	2002 AS_{3}	—	January 8, 2002	Oizumi	T. Kobayashi	·	2.5 km	MPC · JPL
95016 Kimjeongho	2002 AA_{9}	Kimjeongho	January 9, 2002	Bohyunsan	Jeon, Y.-B.	(11882)	2.7 km	MPC · JPL
95017	2002 AX_{9}	—	January 11, 2002	Desert Eagle	W. K. Y. Yeung	NYS	2.4 km	MPC · JPL
95018	2002 AZ_{9}	—	January 11, 2002	Desert Eagle	W. K. Y. Yeung	·	5.3 km	MPC · JPL
95019	2002 AR_{10}	—	January 5, 2002	Haleakala	NEAT	V	1.4 km	MPC · JPL
95020 Nencini	2002 AV_{12}	Nencini	January 10, 2002	Campo Imperatore	F. Bernardi	·	2.3 km	MPC · JPL
95021	2002 AE_{14}	—	January 12, 2002	Desert Eagle	W. K. Y. Yeung	·	3.2 km	MPC · JPL
95022	2002 AG_{14}	—	January 12, 2002	Desert Eagle	W. K. Y. Yeung	·	2.9 km	MPC · JPL
95023	2002 AE_{16}	—	January 4, 2002	Haleakala	NEAT	(2076)	1.9 km	MPC · JPL
95024 Ericaellingson	2002 AH_{18}	Ericaellingson	January 8, 2002	Cima Ekar	ADAS	·	2.2 km	MPC · JPL
95025	2002 AV_{20}	—	January 7, 2002	Palomar	NEAT	·	1.5 km	MPC · JPL
95026	2002 AG_{21}	—	January 8, 2002	Socorro	LINEAR	·	1.3 km	MPC · JPL
95027	2002 AG_{23}	—	January 5, 2002	Haleakala	NEAT	·	2.5 km	MPC · JPL
95028	2002 AY_{23}	—	January 7, 2002	Palomar	NEAT	NYS ·	3.3 km	MPC · JPL
95029	2002 AA_{24}	—	January 7, 2002	Palomar	NEAT	NYS	2.1 km	MPC · JPL
95030	2002 AP_{25}	—	January 8, 2002	Palomar	NEAT	·	4.7 km	MPC · JPL
95031	2002 AV_{26}	—	January 13, 2002	Majorca	J. Nomen	NYS ·	4.7 km	MPC · JPL
95032	2002 AW_{26}	—	January 9, 2002	Haleakala	NEAT	·	2.2 km	MPC · JPL
95033	2002 AX_{26}	—	January 12, 2002	Goodricke-Pigott	R. A. Tucker	·	4.7 km	MPC · JPL
95034	2002 AY_{26}	—	January 14, 2002	Desert Eagle	W. K. Y. Yeung	·	3.9 km	MPC · JPL
95035	2002 AA_{27}	—	January 14, 2002	Desert Eagle	W. K. Y. Yeung	·	2.0 km	MPC · JPL
95036	2002 AC_{27}	—	January 14, 2002	Desert Eagle	W. K. Y. Yeung	·	2.7 km	MPC · JPL
95037	2002 AF_{27}	—	January 14, 2002	Desert Eagle	W. K. Y. Yeung	EUN	2.4 km	MPC · JPL
95038	2002 AN_{27}	—	January 5, 2002	Anderson Mesa	LONEOS	·	3.5 km	MPC · JPL
95039	2002 AO_{27}	—	January 5, 2002	Anderson Mesa	LONEOS	·	1.7 km	MPC · JPL
95040	2002 AC_{28}	—	January 7, 2002	Anderson Mesa	LONEOS	NYS	2.6 km	MPC · JPL
95041	2002 AY_{30}	—	January 9, 2002	Socorro	LINEAR	·	2.7 km	MPC · JPL
95042	2002 AH_{31}	—	January 9, 2002	Socorro	LINEAR	·	2.7 km	MPC · JPL
95043	2002 AU_{33}	—	January 12, 2002	Kitt Peak	Spacewatch	·	2.0 km	MPC · JPL
95044	2002 AP_{35}	—	January 8, 2002	Socorro	LINEAR	V	1.0 km	MPC · JPL
95045	2002 AM_{36}	—	January 9, 2002	Socorro	LINEAR	·	1.8 km	MPC · JPL
95046	2002 AY_{36}	—	January 9, 2002	Socorro	LINEAR	·	3.2 km	MPC · JPL
95047	2002 AL_{37}	—	January 9, 2002	Socorro	LINEAR	·	3.6 km	MPC · JPL
95048	2002 AE_{40}	—	January 9, 2002	Socorro	LINEAR	·	1.8 km	MPC · JPL
95049	2002 AQ_{41}	—	January 9, 2002	Socorro	LINEAR	·	3.3 km	MPC · JPL
95050	2002 AU_{42}	—	January 9, 2002	Socorro	LINEAR	V	1.3 km	MPC · JPL
95051	2002 AD_{45}	—	January 9, 2002	Socorro	LINEAR	(5)	1.8 km	MPC · JPL
95052	2002 AS_{45}	—	January 9, 2002	Socorro	LINEAR	NYS ·	2.5 km	MPC · JPL
95053	2002 AF_{46}	—	January 9, 2002	Socorro	LINEAR	·	3.4 km	MPC · JPL
95054	2002 AF_{48}	—	January 9, 2002	Socorro	LINEAR	·	3.4 km	MPC · JPL
95055	2002 AL_{50}	—	January 9, 2002	Socorro	LINEAR	·	1.4 km	MPC · JPL
95056	2002 AS_{50}	—	January 9, 2002	Socorro	LINEAR	·	5.1 km	MPC · JPL
95057	2002 AF_{53}	—	January 9, 2002	Socorro	LINEAR	·	2.8 km	MPC · JPL
95058	2002 AM_{58}	—	January 9, 2002	Socorro	LINEAR	·	3.9 km	MPC · JPL
95059	2002 AH_{59}	—	January 9, 2002	Socorro	LINEAR	·	5.4 km	MPC · JPL
95060	2002 AJ_{59}	—	January 9, 2002	Socorro	LINEAR	·	2.3 km	MPC · JPL
95061	2002 AR_{59}	—	January 9, 2002	Socorro	LINEAR	·	3.3 km	MPC · JPL
95062	2002 AW_{59}	—	January 9, 2002	Socorro	LINEAR	·	3.0 km	MPC · JPL
95063	2002 AV_{61}	—	January 11, 2002	Socorro	LINEAR	NYS	2.7 km	MPC · JPL
95064	2002 AD_{62}	—	January 11, 2002	Socorro	LINEAR	·	2.0 km	MPC · JPL
95065	2002 AG_{63}	—	January 11, 2002	Socorro	LINEAR	·	2.3 km	MPC · JPL
95066	2002 AH_{63}	—	January 11, 2002	Socorro	LINEAR	·	2.4 km	MPC · JPL
95067	2002 AZ_{63}	—	January 11, 2002	Socorro	LINEAR	·	5.5 km	MPC · JPL
95068	2002 AD_{65}	—	January 11, 2002	Socorro	LINEAR	·	1.7 km	MPC · JPL
95069	2002 AM_{65}	—	January 11, 2002	Socorro	LINEAR	·	3.1 km	MPC · JPL
95070	2002 AQ_{65}	—	January 11, 2002	Socorro	LINEAR	HNS	3.7 km	MPC · JPL
95071	2002 AT_{66}	—	January 13, 2002	Socorro	LINEAR	·	1.3 km	MPC · JPL
95072 ČVUT	2002 AW_{66}	ČVUT	January 15, 2002	Kleť	M. Tichý	·	3.7 km	MPC · JPL
95073	2002 AP_{70}	—	January 8, 2002	Socorro	LINEAR	·	3.0 km	MPC · JPL
95074	2002 AW_{70}	—	January 8, 2002	Socorro	LINEAR	CLA	4.0 km	MPC · JPL
95075	2002 AC_{72}	—	January 8, 2002	Socorro	LINEAR	NYS	2.4 km	MPC · JPL
95076	2002 AS_{72}	—	January 8, 2002	Socorro	LINEAR	·	2.5 km	MPC · JPL
95077	2002 AO_{73}	—	January 8, 2002	Socorro	LINEAR	·	1.3 km	MPC · JPL
95078	2002 AP_{76}	—	January 8, 2002	Socorro	LINEAR	·	1.7 km	MPC · JPL
95079	2002 AO_{78}	—	January 8, 2002	Socorro	LINEAR	·	1.2 km	MPC · JPL
95080	2002 AZ_{80}	—	January 9, 2002	Socorro	LINEAR	·	2.3 km	MPC · JPL
95081	2002 AK_{82}	—	January 9, 2002	Socorro	LINEAR	·	1.7 km	MPC · JPL
95082	2002 AS_{83}	—	January 9, 2002	Socorro	LINEAR	·	3.1 km	MPC · JPL
95083	2002 AZ_{85}	—	January 9, 2002	Socorro	LINEAR	·	3.5 km	MPC · JPL
95084	2002 AG_{87}	—	January 9, 2002	Socorro	LINEAR	·	2.6 km	MPC · JPL
95085	2002 AJ_{87}	—	January 9, 2002	Socorro	LINEAR	·	2.6 km	MPC · JPL
95086	2002 AJ_{89}	—	January 9, 2002	Socorro	LINEAR	(2076)	1.6 km	MPC · JPL
95087	2002 AQ_{89}	—	January 11, 2002	Socorro	LINEAR	PHO	3.1 km	MPC · JPL
95088	2002 AC_{96}	—	January 8, 2002	Socorro	LINEAR	·	1.8 km	MPC · JPL
95089	2002 AZ_{97}	—	January 8, 2002	Socorro	LINEAR	·	1.5 km	MPC · JPL
95090	2002 AF_{99}	—	January 8, 2002	Socorro	LINEAR	RAF	2.2 km	MPC · JPL
95091	2002 AM_{99}	—	January 8, 2002	Socorro	LINEAR	·	3.9 km	MPC · JPL
95092	2002 AC_{100}	—	January 8, 2002	Socorro	LINEAR	·	2.2 km	MPC · JPL
95093	2002 AB_{101}	—	January 8, 2002	Socorro	LINEAR	·	2.0 km	MPC · JPL
95094	2002 AM_{102}	—	January 8, 2002	Socorro	LINEAR	·	3.1 km	MPC · JPL
95095	2002 AH_{105}	—	January 9, 2002	Socorro	LINEAR	·	4.3 km	MPC · JPL
95096	2002 AM_{105}	—	January 9, 2002	Socorro	LINEAR	·	2.3 km	MPC · JPL
95097	2002 AW_{106}	—	January 9, 2002	Socorro	LINEAR	NYS	1.9 km	MPC · JPL
95098	2002 AB_{111}	—	January 9, 2002	Socorro	LINEAR	MAS	1.3 km	MPC · JPL
95099	2002 AK_{111}	—	January 9, 2002	Socorro	LINEAR	·	7.3 km	MPC · JPL
95100	2002 AF_{112}	—	January 9, 2002	Socorro	LINEAR	·	2.5 km	MPC · JPL

== 95101–95200 ==
back to top

Designation			Discovery			Properties		Ref
Permanent	Provisional	Named after	Date	Site	Discoverer(s)	Category	Diam.	Ref
95101	2002 AH_{113}	—	January 9, 2002	Socorro	LINEAR	·	2.0 km	MPC · JPL
95102	2002 AS_{113}	—	January 9, 2002	Socorro	LINEAR	·	1.8 km	MPC · JPL
95103	2002 AP_{114}	—	January 9, 2002	Socorro	LINEAR	·	2.0 km	MPC · JPL
95104	2002 AN_{116}	—	January 9, 2002	Socorro	LINEAR	·	2.3 km	MPC · JPL
95105	2002 AY_{116}	—	January 9, 2002	Socorro	LINEAR	·	2.5 km	MPC · JPL
95106	2002 AP_{117}	—	January 9, 2002	Socorro	LINEAR	·	2.5 km	MPC · JPL
95107	2002 AJ_{118}	—	January 9, 2002	Socorro	LINEAR	·	3.2 km	MPC · JPL
95108	2002 AL_{118}	—	January 9, 2002	Socorro	LINEAR	·	2.1 km	MPC · JPL
95109	2002 AP_{118}	—	January 9, 2002	Socorro	LINEAR	·	1.9 km	MPC · JPL
95110	2002 AR_{118}	—	January 9, 2002	Socorro	LINEAR	NYS	2.6 km	MPC · JPL
95111	2002 AV_{120}	—	January 9, 2002	Socorro	LINEAR	·	2.6 km	MPC · JPL
95112	2002 AE_{121}	—	January 9, 2002	Socorro	LINEAR	·	2.1 km	MPC · JPL
95113	2002 AG_{121}	—	January 9, 2002	Socorro	LINEAR	·	5.8 km	MPC · JPL
95114	2002 AM_{121}	—	January 9, 2002	Socorro	LINEAR	ADE	5.1 km	MPC · JPL
95115	2002 AK_{122}	—	January 9, 2002	Socorro	LINEAR	·	5.4 km	MPC · JPL
95116	2002 AP_{122}	—	January 9, 2002	Socorro	LINEAR	·	3.2 km	MPC · JPL
95117	2002 AQ_{122}	—	January 9, 2002	Socorro	LINEAR	·	5.3 km	MPC · JPL
95118	2002 AL_{124}	—	January 9, 2002	Socorro	LINEAR	·	2.0 km	MPC · JPL
95119	2002 AB_{126}	—	January 11, 2002	Socorro	LINEAR	·	4.3 km	MPC · JPL
95120	2002 AW_{127}	—	January 13, 2002	Socorro	LINEAR	GEF	3.0 km	MPC · JPL
95121	2002 AL_{130}	—	January 12, 2002	Palomar	NEAT	·	2.2 km	MPC · JPL
95122	2002 AQ_{135}	—	January 9, 2002	Socorro	LINEAR	ERI	2.2 km	MPC · JPL
95123	2002 AP_{139}	—	January 9, 2002	Socorro	LINEAR	·	3.2 km	MPC · JPL
95124	2002 AK_{141}	—	January 13, 2002	Socorro	LINEAR	·	2.4 km	MPC · JPL
95125	2002 AE_{143}	—	January 13, 2002	Socorro	LINEAR	·	2.1 km	MPC · JPL
95126	2002 AZ_{148}	—	January 13, 2002	Socorro	LINEAR	·	2.7 km	MPC · JPL
95127	2002 AL_{150}	—	January 14, 2002	Socorro	LINEAR	·	3.2 km	MPC · JPL
95128	2002 AR_{152}	—	January 14, 2002	Socorro	LINEAR	·	5.0 km	MPC · JPL
95129	2002 AQ_{153}	—	January 14, 2002	Socorro	LINEAR	·	2.2 km	MPC · JPL
95130	2002 AH_{155}	—	January 14, 2002	Socorro	LINEAR	·	2.8 km	MPC · JPL
95131	2002 AK_{155}	—	January 14, 2002	Socorro	LINEAR	MAS ·	4.1 km	MPC · JPL
95132	2002 AO_{155}	—	January 14, 2002	Socorro	LINEAR	·	6.4 km	MPC · JPL
95133	2002 AB_{156}	—	January 14, 2002	Socorro	LINEAR	·	2.2 km	MPC · JPL
95134	2002 AN_{156}	—	January 13, 2002	Socorro	LINEAR	·	3.0 km	MPC · JPL
95135	2002 AM_{158}	—	January 13, 2002	Socorro	LINEAR	(5)	2.2 km	MPC · JPL
95136	2002 AD_{159}	—	January 13, 2002	Socorro	LINEAR	·	3.4 km	MPC · JPL
95137	2002 AH_{159}	—	January 13, 2002	Socorro	LINEAR	·	1.6 km	MPC · JPL
95138	2002 AD_{160}	—	January 13, 2002	Socorro	LINEAR	(12739)	3.3 km	MPC · JPL
95139	2002 AF_{160}	—	January 13, 2002	Socorro	LINEAR	(5)	2.3 km	MPC · JPL
95140	2002 AB_{162}	—	January 13, 2002	Socorro	LINEAR	MAS	1.4 km	MPC · JPL
95141	2002 AG_{162}	—	January 13, 2002	Socorro	LINEAR	·	2.1 km	MPC · JPL
95142	2002 AF_{163}	—	January 13, 2002	Socorro	LINEAR	·	1.7 km	MPC · JPL
95143	2002 AQ_{164}	—	January 13, 2002	Socorro	LINEAR	fast	2.4 km	MPC · JPL
95144	2002 AG_{165}	—	January 13, 2002	Socorro	LINEAR	·	1.6 km	MPC · JPL
95145	2002 AQ_{165}	—	January 13, 2002	Socorro	LINEAR	NYS	2.3 km	MPC · JPL
95146	2002 AV_{165}	—	January 13, 2002	Socorro	LINEAR	·	2.6 km	MPC · JPL
95147	2002 AP_{166}	—	January 13, 2002	Socorro	LINEAR	·	5.1 km	MPC · JPL
95148	2002 AH_{167}	—	January 13, 2002	Socorro	LINEAR	HNS	2.5 km	MPC · JPL
95149	2002 AL_{167}	—	January 13, 2002	Socorro	LINEAR	·	2.6 km	MPC · JPL
95150	2002 AQ_{167}	—	January 13, 2002	Socorro	LINEAR	MAR	2.7 km	MPC · JPL
95151	2002 AU_{167}	—	January 13, 2002	Socorro	LINEAR	·	2.1 km	MPC · JPL
95152	2002 AX_{167}	—	January 13, 2002	Socorro	LINEAR	PHO	2.3 km	MPC · JPL
95153	2002 AP_{170}	—	January 14, 2002	Socorro	LINEAR	·	2.2 km	MPC · JPL
95154	2002 AZ_{170}	—	January 14, 2002	Socorro	LINEAR	·	1.8 km	MPC · JPL
95155	2002 AH_{175}	—	January 14, 2002	Socorro	LINEAR	·	3.3 km	MPC · JPL
95156	2002 AK_{175}	—	January 14, 2002	Socorro	LINEAR	·	2.9 km	MPC · JPL
95157	2002 AU_{175}	—	January 14, 2002	Socorro	LINEAR	·	4.2 km	MPC · JPL
95158	2002 AZ_{177}	—	January 14, 2002	Socorro	LINEAR	·	2.5 km	MPC · JPL
95159	2002 AE_{178}	—	January 14, 2002	Socorro	LINEAR	·	3.0 km	MPC · JPL
95160	2002 AG_{178}	—	January 14, 2002	Socorro	LINEAR	·	2.9 km	MPC · JPL
95161	2002 AS_{178}	—	January 14, 2002	Socorro	LINEAR	·	3.8 km	MPC · JPL
95162	2002 AV_{178}	—	January 14, 2002	Socorro	LINEAR	MAS	1.5 km	MPC · JPL
95163	2002 AZ_{178}	—	January 14, 2002	Socorro	LINEAR	·	2.5 km	MPC · JPL
95164	2002 AB_{179}	—	January 14, 2002	Socorro	LINEAR	·	3.9 km	MPC · JPL
95165	2002 AH_{180}	—	January 12, 2002	Nyukasa	Nyukasa	·	2.6 km	MPC · JPL
95166	2002 AO_{183}	—	January 6, 2002	Palomar	NEAT	·	2.7 km	MPC · JPL
95167	2002 AT_{184}	—	January 7, 2002	Anderson Mesa	LONEOS	·	2.5 km	MPC · JPL
95168	2002 AX_{185}	—	January 8, 2002	Socorro	LINEAR	·	1.8 km	MPC · JPL
95169	2002 AC_{186}	—	January 8, 2002	Socorro	LINEAR	·	1.3 km	MPC · JPL
95170	2002 AL_{187}	—	January 8, 2002	Socorro	LINEAR	V	1.7 km	MPC · JPL
95171	2002 AT_{188}	—	January 10, 2002	Palomar	NEAT	·	2.4 km	MPC · JPL
95172	2002 AZ_{190}	—	January 11, 2002	Palomar	NEAT	HNS	2.6 km	MPC · JPL
95173	2002 AD_{191}	—	January 11, 2002	Socorro	LINEAR	EOS	5.3 km	MPC · JPL
95174	2002 AD_{192}	—	January 12, 2002	Kitt Peak	Spacewatch	·	2.2 km	MPC · JPL
95175	2002 AJ_{192}	—	January 12, 2002	Kitt Peak	Spacewatch	·	4.7 km	MPC · JPL
95176	2002 AJ_{196}	—	January 12, 2002	Socorro	LINEAR	·	5.1 km	MPC · JPL
95177	2002 AT_{197}	—	January 14, 2002	Palomar	NEAT	PHO	2.0 km	MPC · JPL
95178	2002 AD_{202}	—	January 11, 2002	Socorro	LINEAR	·	4.0 km	MPC · JPL
95179 Berkó	2002 BO	Berkó	January 16, 2002	Piszkéstető	K. Sárneczky, Z. Heiner	MAS	1.4 km	MPC · JPL
95180	2002 BJ_{4}	—	January 19, 2002	Anderson Mesa	LONEOS	·	3.7 km	MPC · JPL
95181	2002 BP_{4}	—	January 19, 2002	Anderson Mesa	LONEOS	PHO	2.3 km	MPC · JPL
95182	2002 BZ_{4}	—	January 19, 2002	Anderson Mesa	LONEOS	·	3.4 km	MPC · JPL
95183	2002 BB_{9}	—	January 18, 2002	Socorro	LINEAR	ADE	5.5 km	MPC · JPL
95184	2002 BL_{10}	—	January 18, 2002	Socorro	LINEAR	·	2.0 km	MPC · JPL
95185	2002 BN_{10}	—	January 18, 2002	Socorro	LINEAR	·	2.4 km	MPC · JPL
95186	2002 BT_{10}	—	January 18, 2002	Socorro	LINEAR	NYS	3.3 km	MPC · JPL
95187	2002 BD_{11}	—	January 18, 2002	Socorro	LINEAR	BRA	3.0 km	MPC · JPL
95188	2002 BK_{11}	—	January 19, 2002	Socorro	LINEAR	·	5.9 km	MPC · JPL
95189	2002 BM_{11}	—	January 19, 2002	Socorro	LINEAR	·	1.5 km	MPC · JPL
95190	2002 BZ_{11}	—	January 19, 2002	Socorro	LINEAR	MAS	1.6 km	MPC · JPL
95191	2002 BB_{12}	—	January 19, 2002	Socorro	LINEAR	NYS	2.5 km	MPC · JPL
95192	2002 BS_{12}	—	January 20, 2002	Kitt Peak	Spacewatch	(5)	1.9 km	MPC · JPL
95193	2002 BU_{13}	—	January 19, 2002	Socorro	LINEAR	·	5.1 km	MPC · JPL
95194	2002 BB_{14}	—	January 19, 2002	Socorro	LINEAR	·	4.3 km	MPC · JPL
95195	2002 BB_{16}	—	January 19, 2002	Socorro	LINEAR	·	5.6 km	MPC · JPL
95196	2002 BS_{16}	—	January 19, 2002	Socorro	LINEAR	·	4.3 km	MPC · JPL
95197	2002 BV_{16}	—	January 19, 2002	Socorro	LINEAR	·	3.4 km	MPC · JPL
95198	2002 BN_{17}	—	January 21, 2002	Socorro	LINEAR	·	2.5 km	MPC · JPL
95199	2002 BD_{19}	—	January 21, 2002	Socorro	LINEAR	·	4.1 km	MPC · JPL
95200	2002 BF_{19}	—	January 21, 2002	Socorro	LINEAR	RAF	2.3 km	MPC · JPL

== 95201–95300 ==
back to top

Designation			Discovery			Properties		Ref
Permanent	Provisional	Named after	Date	Site	Discoverer(s)	Category	Diam.	Ref
95201	2002 BJ_{19}	—	January 21, 2002	Palomar	NEAT	·	3.0 km	MPC · JPL
95202	2002 BR_{21}	—	January 25, 2002	Socorro	LINEAR	PHO	3.1 km	MPC · JPL
95203	2002 BU_{22}	—	January 23, 2002	Socorro	LINEAR	·	3.7 km	MPC · JPL
95204	2002 BY_{22}	—	January 23, 2002	Socorro	LINEAR	·	2.4 km	MPC · JPL
95205	2002 BR_{24}	—	January 23, 2002	Socorro	LINEAR	PHO	1.5 km	MPC · JPL
95206	2002 BM_{25}	—	January 25, 2002	Palomar	NEAT	GEF	3.0 km	MPC · JPL
95207	2002 BG_{29}	—	January 20, 2002	Anderson Mesa	LONEOS	·	8.3 km	MPC · JPL
95208	2002 BM_{31}	—	January 23, 2002	Socorro	LINEAR	EOS	4.2 km	MPC · JPL
95209	2002 CW	—	February 2, 2002	Cima Ekar	ADAS	EOS	3.7 km	MPC · JPL
95210	2002 CJ_{1}	—	February 3, 2002	Anderson Mesa	LONEOS	·	5.5 km	MPC · JPL
95211	2002 CJ_{2}	—	February 3, 2002	Palomar	NEAT	·	3.1 km	MPC · JPL
95212	2002 CW_{3}	—	February 3, 2002	Palomar	NEAT	·	2.5 km	MPC · JPL
95213	2002 CN_{6}	—	February 1, 2002	Socorro	LINEAR	·	4.2 km	MPC · JPL
95214	2002 CQ_{7}	—	February 6, 2002	Desert Eagle	W. K. Y. Yeung	·	5.9 km	MPC · JPL
95215	2002 CA_{8}	—	February 3, 2002	Palomar	NEAT	·	4.0 km	MPC · JPL
95216	2002 CU_{8}	—	February 5, 2002	Palomar	NEAT	·	4.5 km	MPC · JPL
95217	2002 CD_{11}	—	February 6, 2002	Desert Eagle	W. K. Y. Yeung	THM	7.9 km	MPC · JPL
95218	2002 CO_{14}	—	February 8, 2002	Ametlla de Mar	J. Nomen	·	1.9 km	MPC · JPL
95219 Borgman	2002 CT_{14}	Borgman	February 8, 2002	Needville	Needville	·	5.3 km	MPC · JPL
95220	2002 CQ_{15}	—	February 8, 2002	Fountain Hills	C. W. Juels, P. R. Holvorcem	EUN	2.9 km	MPC · JPL
95221	2002 CW_{15}	—	February 8, 2002	Desert Eagle	W. K. Y. Yeung	EOS	3.0 km	MPC · JPL
95222	2002 CZ_{16}	—	February 6, 2002	Socorro	LINEAR	·	1.9 km	MPC · JPL
95223	2002 CU_{22}	—	February 5, 2002	Palomar	NEAT	·	3.8 km	MPC · JPL
95224	2002 CA_{23}	—	February 5, 2002	Haleakala	NEAT	EUN	2.6 km	MPC · JPL
95225	2002 CH_{23}	—	February 5, 2002	Haleakala	NEAT	RAF	2.4 km	MPC · JPL
95226	2002 CP_{23}	—	February 6, 2002	Palomar	NEAT	·	2.1 km	MPC · JPL
95227	2002 CO_{25}	—	February 7, 2002	Socorro	LINEAR	·	1.4 km	MPC · JPL
95228	2002 CS_{29}	—	February 6, 2002	Socorro	LINEAR	·	3.0 km	MPC · JPL
95229	2002 CA_{30}	—	February 6, 2002	Socorro	LINEAR	·	2.4 km	MPC · JPL
95230	2002 CK_{30}	—	February 6, 2002	Socorro	LINEAR	·	5.7 km	MPC · JPL
95231	2002 CL_{30}	—	February 6, 2002	Socorro	LINEAR	·	2.3 km	MPC · JPL
95232	2002 CX_{31}	—	February 6, 2002	Socorro	LINEAR	·	6.2 km	MPC · JPL
95233	2002 CS_{37}	—	February 7, 2002	Socorro	LINEAR	THM	5.0 km	MPC · JPL
95234	2002 CP_{38}	—	February 7, 2002	Socorro	LINEAR	AGN	2.3 km	MPC · JPL
95235	2002 CL_{39}	—	February 11, 2002	Desert Eagle	W. K. Y. Yeung	KOR	2.8 km	MPC · JPL
95236	2002 CL_{40}	—	February 7, 2002	Palomar	NEAT	EUN	2.6 km	MPC · JPL
95237	2002 CO_{40}	—	February 7, 2002	Palomar	NEAT	·	5.1 km	MPC · JPL
95238	2002 CH_{43}	—	February 12, 2002	Fountain Hills	C. W. Juels, P. R. Holvorcem	·	8.8 km	MPC · JPL
95239	2002 CH_{46}	—	February 6, 2002	Goodricke-Pigott	R. A. Tucker	·	3.1 km	MPC · JPL
95240	2002 CW_{47}	—	February 3, 2002	Haleakala	NEAT	CYB	9.9 km	MPC · JPL
95241	2002 CF_{50}	—	February 6, 2002	Desert Eagle	W. K. Y. Yeung	KOR	2.9 km	MPC · JPL
95242	2002 CK_{51}	—	February 12, 2002	Desert Eagle	W. K. Y. Yeung	·	5.6 km	MPC · JPL
95243	2002 CL_{51}	—	February 12, 2002	Desert Eagle	W. K. Y. Yeung	·	5.0 km	MPC · JPL
95244	2002 CM_{51}	—	February 12, 2002	Desert Eagle	W. K. Y. Yeung	·	5.2 km	MPC · JPL
95245	2002 CV_{51}	—	February 12, 2002	Desert Eagle	W. K. Y. Yeung	·	4.2 km	MPC · JPL
95246	2002 CB_{52}	—	February 12, 2002	Desert Eagle	W. K. Y. Yeung	·	8.5 km	MPC · JPL
95247 Schalansky	2002 CH_{52}	Schalansky	February 12, 2002	Desert Eagle	W. K. Y. Yeung	URS	7.0 km	MPC · JPL
95248	2002 CS_{54}	—	February 7, 2002	Socorro	LINEAR	·	3.6 km	MPC · JPL
95249	2002 CC_{55}	—	February 7, 2002	Socorro	LINEAR	·	4.4 km	MPC · JPL
95250	2002 CQ_{55}	—	February 7, 2002	Socorro	LINEAR	MRX	2.1 km	MPC · JPL
95251	2002 CR_{55}	—	February 7, 2002	Socorro	LINEAR	·	2.2 km	MPC · JPL
95252	2002 CW_{55}	—	February 7, 2002	Socorro	LINEAR	·	7.4 km	MPC · JPL
95253	2002 CD_{56}	—	February 7, 2002	Socorro	LINEAR	EOS	4.3 km	MPC · JPL
95254	2002 CM_{56}	—	February 7, 2002	Socorro	LINEAR	·	2.5 km	MPC · JPL
95255	2002 CU_{56}	—	February 7, 2002	Socorro	LINEAR	·	7.4 km	MPC · JPL
95256	2002 CZ_{57}	—	February 6, 2002	Kitt Peak	Spacewatch	·	3.1 km	MPC · JPL
95257	2002 CD_{59}	—	February 12, 2002	Desert Eagle	W. K. Y. Yeung	·	5.1 km	MPC · JPL
95258	2002 CE_{59}	—	February 12, 2002	Desert Eagle	W. K. Y. Yeung	·	6.4 km	MPC · JPL
95259	2002 CG_{59}	—	February 12, 2002	Desert Eagle	W. K. Y. Yeung	NYS	2.1 km	MPC · JPL
95260	2002 CS_{59}	—	February 13, 2002	Desert Eagle	W. K. Y. Yeung	·	5.5 km	MPC · JPL
95261	2002 CD_{61}	—	February 6, 2002	Socorro	LINEAR	·	6.4 km	MPC · JPL
95262	2002 CL_{61}	—	February 6, 2002	Socorro	LINEAR	·	2.8 km	MPC · JPL
95263	2002 CW_{61}	—	February 6, 2002	Socorro	LINEAR	·	2.5 km	MPC · JPL
95264	2002 CF_{63}	—	February 6, 2002	Socorro	LINEAR	·	4.2 km	MPC · JPL
95265	2002 CT_{63}	—	February 6, 2002	Socorro	LINEAR	·	5.0 km	MPC · JPL
95266	2002 CL_{64}	—	February 6, 2002	Socorro	LINEAR	·	3.5 km	MPC · JPL
95267	2002 CQ_{66}	—	February 7, 2002	Socorro	LINEAR	·	3.8 km	MPC · JPL
95268	2002 CB_{68}	—	February 7, 2002	Socorro	LINEAR	·	3.1 km	MPC · JPL
95269	2002 CO_{68}	—	February 7, 2002	Socorro	LINEAR	HOF	5.4 km	MPC · JPL
95270	2002 CQ_{68}	—	February 7, 2002	Socorro	LINEAR	MAS	1.1 km	MPC · JPL
95271	2002 CH_{69}	—	February 7, 2002	Socorro	LINEAR	WIT	1.8 km	MPC · JPL
95272	2002 CB_{70}	—	February 7, 2002	Socorro	LINEAR	·	3.4 km	MPC · JPL
95273	2002 CR_{72}	—	February 7, 2002	Socorro	LINEAR	·	4.1 km	MPC · JPL
95274	2002 CU_{72}	—	February 7, 2002	Socorro	LINEAR	·	2.0 km	MPC · JPL
95275	2002 CN_{73}	—	February 7, 2002	Socorro	LINEAR	·	6.8 km	MPC · JPL
95276	2002 CZ_{73}	—	February 7, 2002	Socorro	LINEAR	KOR	2.4 km	MPC · JPL
95277	2002 CH_{75}	—	February 7, 2002	Socorro	LINEAR	·	4.9 km	MPC · JPL
95278	2002 CC_{76}	—	February 7, 2002	Socorro	LINEAR	·	3.4 km	MPC · JPL
95279	2002 CO_{76}	—	February 7, 2002	Socorro	LINEAR	·	2.9 km	MPC · JPL
95280	2002 CD_{79}	—	February 7, 2002	Socorro	LINEAR	·	1.4 km	MPC · JPL
95281	2002 CR_{79}	—	February 7, 2002	Socorro	LINEAR	·	2.7 km	MPC · JPL
95282	2002 CX_{79}	—	February 7, 2002	Socorro	LINEAR	·	2.9 km	MPC · JPL
95283	2002 CO_{81}	—	February 7, 2002	Socorro	LINEAR	KOR	3.1 km	MPC · JPL
95284	2002 CH_{83}	—	February 7, 2002	Socorro	LINEAR	·	4.2 km	MPC · JPL
95285	2002 CP_{83}	—	February 7, 2002	Socorro	LINEAR	·	2.0 km	MPC · JPL
95286	2002 CL_{84}	—	February 7, 2002	Socorro	LINEAR	·	2.3 km	MPC · JPL
95287	2002 CN_{84}	—	February 7, 2002	Socorro	LINEAR	(29841)	2.7 km	MPC · JPL
95288	2002 CG_{85}	—	February 7, 2002	Socorro	LINEAR	·	3.7 km	MPC · JPL
95289	2002 CG_{88}	—	February 7, 2002	Socorro	LINEAR	·	3.8 km	MPC · JPL
95290	2002 CJ_{88}	—	February 7, 2002	Socorro	LINEAR	·	2.8 km	MPC · JPL
95291	2002 CP_{88}	—	February 7, 2002	Socorro	LINEAR	·	3.3 km	MPC · JPL
95292	2002 CM_{89}	—	February 7, 2002	Socorro	LINEAR	KOR	2.9 km	MPC · JPL
95293	2002 CB_{90}	—	February 7, 2002	Socorro	LINEAR	·	3.9 km	MPC · JPL
95294	2002 CG_{90}	—	February 7, 2002	Socorro	LINEAR	·	4.1 km	MPC · JPL
95295	2002 CM_{91}	—	February 7, 2002	Socorro	LINEAR	KOR	2.6 km	MPC · JPL
95296	2002 CQ_{91}	—	February 7, 2002	Socorro	LINEAR	EOS	4.1 km	MPC · JPL
95297	2002 CW_{91}	—	February 7, 2002	Socorro	LINEAR	·	3.4 km	MPC · JPL
95298	2002 CL_{93}	—	February 7, 2002	Socorro	LINEAR	·	6.1 km	MPC · JPL
95299	2002 CO_{93}	—	February 7, 2002	Socorro	LINEAR	·	2.4 km	MPC · JPL
95300	2002 CD_{96}	—	February 7, 2002	Socorro	LINEAR	THM	5.8 km	MPC · JPL

== 95301–95400 ==
back to top

Designation			Discovery			Properties		Ref
Permanent	Provisional	Named after	Date	Site	Discoverer(s)	Category	Diam.	Ref
95301	2002 CS_{96}	—	February 7, 2002	Socorro	LINEAR	EOS	3.9 km	MPC · JPL
95302	2002 CN_{97}	—	February 7, 2002	Socorro	LINEAR	KOR	2.9 km	MPC · JPL
95303	2002 CC_{98}	—	February 7, 2002	Socorro	LINEAR	·	3.0 km	MPC · JPL
95304	2002 CQ_{98}	—	February 7, 2002	Socorro	LINEAR	AST	4.9 km	MPC · JPL
95305	2002 CJ_{99}	—	February 7, 2002	Socorro	LINEAR	·	6.8 km	MPC · JPL
95306	2002 CS_{99}	—	February 7, 2002	Socorro	LINEAR	·	3.2 km	MPC · JPL
95307	2002 CP_{101}	—	February 7, 2002	Socorro	LINEAR	NYS	2.7 km	MPC · JPL
95308	2002 CW_{101}	—	February 7, 2002	Socorro	LINEAR	·	3.3 km	MPC · JPL
95309	2002 CY_{101}	—	February 7, 2002	Socorro	LINEAR	·	4.4 km	MPC · JPL
95310	2002 CP_{102}	—	February 7, 2002	Socorro	LINEAR	PAD	4.8 km	MPC · JPL
95311	2002 CZ_{102}	—	February 7, 2002	Socorro	LINEAR	·	4.7 km	MPC · JPL
95312	2002 CD_{103}	—	February 7, 2002	Socorro	LINEAR	EOS	4.4 km	MPC · JPL
95313	2002 CA_{104}	—	February 7, 2002	Socorro	LINEAR	THM	6.9 km	MPC · JPL
95314	2002 CM_{104}	—	February 7, 2002	Socorro	LINEAR	HOF	5.5 km	MPC · JPL
95315	2002 CT_{104}	—	February 7, 2002	Socorro	LINEAR	·	6.8 km	MPC · JPL
95316	2002 CB_{105}	—	February 7, 2002	Socorro	LINEAR	EOS	4.1 km	MPC · JPL
95317	2002 CJ_{106}	—	February 7, 2002	Socorro	LINEAR	·	3.6 km	MPC · JPL
95318	2002 CF_{107}	—	February 7, 2002	Socorro	LINEAR	SYL · CYB	8.2 km	MPC · JPL
95319	2002 CH_{107}	—	February 7, 2002	Socorro	LINEAR	NYS	2.2 km	MPC · JPL
95320	2002 CR_{107}	—	February 7, 2002	Socorro	LINEAR	·	4.5 km	MPC · JPL
95321	2002 CB_{108}	—	February 7, 2002	Socorro	LINEAR	·	7.7 km	MPC · JPL
95322	2002 CE_{108}	—	February 7, 2002	Socorro	LINEAR	·	4.6 km	MPC · JPL
95323	2002 CS_{108}	—	February 7, 2002	Socorro	LINEAR	slow	2.9 km	MPC · JPL
95324	2002 CU_{108}	—	February 7, 2002	Socorro	LINEAR	·	3.4 km	MPC · JPL
95325	2002 CR_{109}	—	February 7, 2002	Socorro	LINEAR	KOR	3.5 km	MPC · JPL
95326	2002 CC_{110}	—	February 7, 2002	Socorro	LINEAR	·	3.5 km	MPC · JPL
95327	2002 CM_{110}	—	February 7, 2002	Socorro	LINEAR	·	3.7 km	MPC · JPL
95328	2002 CE_{111}	—	February 7, 2002	Socorro	LINEAR	HOF	5.9 km	MPC · JPL
95329	2002 CQ_{111}	—	February 7, 2002	Socorro	LINEAR	·	4.3 km	MPC · JPL
95330	2002 CC_{114}	—	February 8, 2002	Socorro	LINEAR	·	2.7 km	MPC · JPL
95331	2002 CH_{114}	—	February 8, 2002	Socorro	LINEAR	·	2.4 km	MPC · JPL
95332	2002 CQ_{117}	—	February 9, 2002	Anderson Mesa	LONEOS	·	7.8 km	MPC · JPL
95333	2002 CA_{118}	—	February 14, 2002	Desert Eagle	W. K. Y. Yeung	·	4.8 km	MPC · JPL
95334	2002 CD_{118}	—	February 14, 2002	Desert Eagle	W. K. Y. Yeung	·	3.8 km	MPC · JPL
95335	2002 CU_{118}	—	February 3, 2002	Uccle	E. W. Elst, H. Debehogne	EOS	4.3 km	MPC · JPL
95336	2002 CM_{122}	—	February 7, 2002	Socorro	LINEAR	·	2.5 km	MPC · JPL
95337	2002 CO_{125}	—	February 7, 2002	Socorro	LINEAR	·	4.8 km	MPC · JPL
95338	2002 CC_{126}	—	February 7, 2002	Socorro	LINEAR	·	1.9 km	MPC · JPL
95339	2002 CW_{127}	—	February 7, 2002	Socorro	LINEAR	(21344)	3.1 km	MPC · JPL
95340	2002 CR_{129}	—	February 7, 2002	Socorro	LINEAR	·	2.0 km	MPC · JPL
95341	2002 CP_{130}	—	February 7, 2002	Socorro	LINEAR	·	3.7 km	MPC · JPL
95342	2002 CW_{132}	—	February 7, 2002	Socorro	LINEAR	·	3.5 km	MPC · JPL
95343	2002 CM_{133}	—	February 7, 2002	Socorro	LINEAR	·	2.8 km	MPC · JPL
95344	2002 CX_{133}	—	February 7, 2002	Socorro	LINEAR	EOS	3.9 km	MPC · JPL
95345	2002 CZ_{133}	—	February 7, 2002	Socorro	LINEAR	EUN	3.0 km	MPC · JPL
95346	2002 CY_{134}	—	February 8, 2002	Socorro	LINEAR	·	1.8 km	MPC · JPL
95347	2002 CR_{136}	—	February 8, 2002	Socorro	LINEAR	·	2.5 km	MPC · JPL
95348	2002 CM_{137}	—	February 8, 2002	Socorro	LINEAR	·	2.8 km	MPC · JPL
95349	2002 CT_{137}	—	February 8, 2002	Socorro	LINEAR	GEF	2.7 km	MPC · JPL
95350	2002 CJ_{138}	—	February 8, 2002	Socorro	LINEAR	·	1.8 km	MPC · JPL
95351	2002 CT_{138}	—	February 8, 2002	Socorro	LINEAR	·	3.7 km	MPC · JPL
95352	2002 CW_{138}	—	February 8, 2002	Socorro	LINEAR	MRX	2.1 km	MPC · JPL
95353	2002 CY_{138}	—	February 8, 2002	Socorro	LINEAR	·	2.5 km	MPC · JPL
95354	2002 CV_{140}	—	February 8, 2002	Socorro	LINEAR	·	3.3 km	MPC · JPL
95355	2002 CQ_{141}	—	February 8, 2002	Socorro	LINEAR	GEF · slow	3.5 km	MPC · JPL
95356	2002 CU_{141}	—	February 8, 2002	Socorro	LINEAR	THB	9.0 km	MPC · JPL
95357	2002 CS_{143}	—	February 9, 2002	Socorro	LINEAR	·	2.1 km	MPC · JPL
95358	2002 CV_{143}	—	February 9, 2002	Socorro	LINEAR	AEG	6.0 km	MPC · JPL
95359	2002 CN_{144}	—	February 9, 2002	Socorro	LINEAR	·	3.7 km	MPC · JPL
95360	2002 CV_{144}	—	February 9, 2002	Socorro	LINEAR	·	6.7 km	MPC · JPL
95361	2002 CC_{145}	—	February 9, 2002	Socorro	LINEAR	KOR	3.0 km	MPC · JPL
95362	2002 CH_{146}	—	February 9, 2002	Socorro	LINEAR	·	3.4 km	MPC · JPL
95363	2002 CF_{147}	—	February 9, 2002	Socorro	LINEAR	EUP	8.5 km	MPC · JPL
95364	2002 CX_{151}	—	February 10, 2002	Socorro	LINEAR	KOR	2.8 km	MPC · JPL
95365	2002 CS_{155}	—	February 6, 2002	Socorro	LINEAR	·	4.0 km	MPC · JPL
95366	2002 CK_{156}	—	February 7, 2002	Socorro	LINEAR	·	2.8 km	MPC · JPL
95367	2002 CS_{157}	—	February 7, 2002	Socorro	LINEAR	EOS	4.0 km	MPC · JPL
95368	2002 CT_{160}	—	February 8, 2002	Socorro	LINEAR	·	2.7 km	MPC · JPL
95369	2002 CX_{160}	—	February 8, 2002	Socorro	LINEAR	ERI	2.3 km	MPC · JPL
95370	2002 CB_{161}	—	February 8, 2002	Socorro	LINEAR	·	3.2 km	MPC · JPL
95371	2002 CH_{162}	—	February 8, 2002	Socorro	LINEAR	·	2.9 km	MPC · JPL
95372	2002 CJ_{162}	—	February 8, 2002	Socorro	LINEAR	AGN	2.5 km	MPC · JPL
95373	2002 CK_{163}	—	February 8, 2002	Socorro	LINEAR	·	2.4 km	MPC · JPL
95374	2002 CU_{163}	—	February 8, 2002	Socorro	LINEAR	·	1.4 km	MPC · JPL
95375	2002 CH_{165}	—	February 8, 2002	Socorro	LINEAR	·	1.8 km	MPC · JPL
95376	2002 CL_{165}	—	February 8, 2002	Socorro	LINEAR	·	3.5 km	MPC · JPL
95377	2002 CR_{165}	—	February 8, 2002	Socorro	LINEAR	·	2.6 km	MPC · JPL
95378	2002 CT_{166}	—	February 8, 2002	Socorro	LINEAR	PHO	2.4 km	MPC · JPL
95379	2002 CC_{167}	—	February 8, 2002	Socorro	LINEAR	·	3.9 km	MPC · JPL
95380	2002 CN_{167}	—	February 8, 2002	Socorro	LINEAR	·	5.5 km	MPC · JPL
95381	2002 CN_{169}	—	February 8, 2002	Socorro	LINEAR	·	7.2 km	MPC · JPL
95382	2002 CT_{169}	—	February 8, 2002	Socorro	LINEAR	·	1.8 km	MPC · JPL
95383	2002 CC_{170}	—	February 8, 2002	Socorro	LINEAR	PAD	5.1 km	MPC · JPL
95384	2002 CG_{170}	—	February 8, 2002	Socorro	LINEAR	·	5.1 km	MPC · JPL
95385	2002 CQ_{170}	—	February 8, 2002	Socorro	LINEAR	EOS	4.2 km	MPC · JPL
95386	2002 CR_{170}	—	February 8, 2002	Socorro	LINEAR	·	2.3 km	MPC · JPL
95387	2002 CN_{171}	—	February 8, 2002	Socorro	LINEAR	·	4.1 km	MPC · JPL
95388	2002 CF_{172}	—	February 8, 2002	Socorro	LINEAR	·	4.3 km	MPC · JPL
95389	2002 CS_{173}	—	February 8, 2002	Socorro	LINEAR	·	3.6 km	MPC · JPL
95390	2002 CO_{174}	—	February 8, 2002	Socorro	LINEAR	·	4.7 km	MPC · JPL
95391	2002 CY_{174}	—	February 8, 2002	Socorro	LINEAR	JUN	2.5 km	MPC · JPL
95392	2002 CW_{178}	—	February 10, 2002	Socorro	LINEAR	·	4.1 km	MPC · JPL
95393	2002 CU_{183}	—	February 10, 2002	Socorro	LINEAR	·	3.8 km	MPC · JPL
95394	2002 CX_{184}	—	February 10, 2002	Socorro	LINEAR	·	3.2 km	MPC · JPL
95395	2002 CS_{187}	—	February 10, 2002	Socorro	LINEAR	·	3.1 km	MPC · JPL
95396	2002 CG_{188}	—	February 10, 2002	Socorro	LINEAR	·	2.9 km	MPC · JPL
95397	2002 CZ_{192}	—	February 10, 2002	Socorro	LINEAR	(12739)	3.3 km	MPC · JPL
95398	2002 CF_{196}	—	February 10, 2002	Socorro	LINEAR	ADE	5.6 km	MPC · JPL
95399	2002 CR_{198}	—	February 10, 2002	Socorro	LINEAR	·	1.6 km	MPC · JPL
95400	2002 CC_{199}	—	February 10, 2002	Socorro	LINEAR	AGN	1.9 km	MPC · JPL

== 95401–95500 ==
back to top

Designation			Discovery			Properties		Ref
Permanent	Provisional	Named after	Date	Site	Discoverer(s)	Category	Diam.	Ref
95401	2002 CK_{199}	—	February 10, 2002	Socorro	LINEAR	·	4.3 km	MPC · JPL
95402	2002 CS_{199}	—	February 10, 2002	Socorro	LINEAR	·	6.1 km	MPC · JPL
95403	2002 CC_{207}	—	February 10, 2002	Socorro	LINEAR	·	3.6 km	MPC · JPL
95404	2002 CO_{207}	—	February 10, 2002	Socorro	LINEAR	·	4.2 km	MPC · JPL
95405	2002 CN_{210}	—	February 10, 2002	Socorro	LINEAR	THM	4.0 km	MPC · JPL
95406	2002 CE_{212}	—	February 10, 2002	Socorro	LINEAR	·	2.2 km	MPC · JPL
95407	2002 CJ_{212}	—	February 10, 2002	Socorro	LINEAR	·	2.1 km	MPC · JPL
95408	2002 CT_{213}	—	February 10, 2002	Socorro	LINEAR	KOR	2.6 km	MPC · JPL
95409	2002 CN_{215}	—	February 10, 2002	Socorro	LINEAR	·	5.4 km	MPC · JPL
95410	2002 CJ_{217}	—	February 10, 2002	Socorro	LINEAR	·	6.9 km	MPC · JPL
95411	2002 CY_{218}	—	February 10, 2002	Socorro	LINEAR	EOS	4.2 km	MPC · JPL
95412	2002 CV_{219}	—	February 10, 2002	Socorro	LINEAR	·	7.6 km	MPC · JPL
95413	2002 CB_{220}	—	February 10, 2002	Socorro	LINEAR	EUN	3.3 km	MPC · JPL
95414	2002 CR_{220}	—	February 10, 2002	Socorro	LINEAR	·	5.4 km	MPC · JPL
95415	2002 CX_{220}	—	February 10, 2002	Socorro	LINEAR	(5)	2.2 km	MPC · JPL
95416	2002 CN_{221}	—	February 10, 2002	Socorro	LINEAR	·	4.1 km	MPC · JPL
95417	2002 CP_{221}	—	February 10, 2002	Socorro	LINEAR	·	5.2 km	MPC · JPL
95418	2002 CD_{224}	—	February 11, 2002	Socorro	LINEAR	AGN	2.7 km	MPC · JPL
95419	2002 CH_{224}	—	February 11, 2002	Socorro	LINEAR	·	2.6 km	MPC · JPL
95420	2002 CQ_{226}	—	February 5, 2002	Palomar	NEAT	·	4.1 km	MPC · JPL
95421	2002 CG_{229}	—	February 8, 2002	Kitt Peak	Spacewatch	·	3.9 km	MPC · JPL
95422	2002 CG_{232}	—	February 8, 2002	Socorro	LINEAR	·	4.1 km	MPC · JPL
95423	2002 CB_{236}	—	February 9, 2002	Palomar	NEAT	·	9.1 km	MPC · JPL
95424	2002 CY_{236}	—	February 8, 2002	Socorro	LINEAR	·	9.2 km	MPC · JPL
95425	2002 CE_{237}	—	February 10, 2002	Socorro	LINEAR	·	4.9 km	MPC · JPL
95426	2002 CM_{237}	—	February 10, 2002	Socorro	LINEAR	·	3.6 km	MPC · JPL
95427	2002 CP_{237}	—	February 10, 2002	Socorro	LINEAR	VER	9.0 km	MPC · JPL
95428	2002 CF_{238}	—	February 11, 2002	Socorro	LINEAR	·	3.6 km	MPC · JPL
95429	2002 CV_{238}	—	February 11, 2002	Socorro	LINEAR	·	2.3 km	MPC · JPL
95430	2002 CW_{238}	—	February 11, 2002	Socorro	LINEAR	·	4.8 km	MPC · JPL
95431	2002 CZ_{240}	—	February 11, 2002	Socorro	LINEAR	KOR	3.0 km	MPC · JPL
95432	2002 CW_{241}	—	February 11, 2002	Socorro	LINEAR	·	4.2 km	MPC · JPL
95433	2002 CH_{242}	—	February 11, 2002	Socorro	LINEAR	·	1.5 km	MPC · JPL
95434	2002 CL_{242}	—	February 11, 2002	Socorro	LINEAR	EOS	4.1 km	MPC · JPL
95435	2002 CK_{243}	—	February 11, 2002	Socorro	LINEAR	NYS	2.0 km	MPC · JPL
95436	2002 CN_{243}	—	February 11, 2002	Socorro	LINEAR	URS	7.5 km	MPC · JPL
95437	2002 CQ_{243}	—	February 11, 2002	Socorro	LINEAR	·	2.1 km	MPC · JPL
95438	2002 CD_{244}	—	February 11, 2002	Socorro	LINEAR	·	8.7 km	MPC · JPL
95439	2002 CJ_{244}	—	February 11, 2002	Socorro	LINEAR	·	3.3 km	MPC · JPL
95440	2002 CS_{244}	—	February 11, 2002	Socorro	LINEAR	THM	8.1 km	MPC · JPL
95441	2002 CW_{244}	—	February 11, 2002	Socorro	LINEAR	·	6.3 km	MPC · JPL
95442	2002 CS_{247}	—	February 15, 2002	Socorro	LINEAR	THM	6.5 km	MPC · JPL
95443	2002 CW_{247}	—	February 15, 2002	Socorro	LINEAR	·	6.3 km	MPC · JPL
95444	2002 CO_{248}	—	February 14, 2002	Palomar	NEAT	WIT	1.9 km	MPC · JPL
95445	2002 CM_{254}	—	February 5, 2002	Palomar	NEAT	·	2.4 km	MPC · JPL
95446	2002 CW_{254}	—	February 6, 2002	Anderson Mesa	LONEOS	·	3.8 km	MPC · JPL
95447	2002 CY_{255}	—	February 6, 2002	Palomar	NEAT	·	3.7 km	MPC · JPL
95448	2002 CY_{256}	—	February 4, 2002	Palomar	NEAT	·	3.7 km	MPC · JPL
95449 Frederickgregory	2002 CJ_{261}	Frederickgregory	February 7, 2002	Kitt Peak	M. W. Buie	·	2.8 km	MPC · JPL
95450	2002 CP_{272}	—	February 8, 2002	Anderson Mesa	LONEOS	·	2.8 km	MPC · JPL
95451	2002 CV_{277}	—	February 7, 2002	Palomar	NEAT	·	3.5 km	MPC · JPL
95452	2002 CO_{280}	—	February 7, 2002	Haleakala	NEAT	·	4.8 km	MPC · JPL
95453	2002 CK_{284}	—	February 9, 2002	Kitt Peak	Spacewatch	·	3.3 km	MPC · JPL
95454	2002 CE_{289}	—	February 10, 2002	Socorro	LINEAR	EUN	2.7 km	MPC · JPL
95455	2002 CY_{295}	—	February 10, 2002	Anderson Mesa	LONEOS	slow	8.3 km	MPC · JPL
95456	2002 CC_{301}	—	February 11, 2002	Socorro	LINEAR	EOS	4.7 km	MPC · JPL
95457	2002 CD_{303}	—	February 12, 2002	Socorro	LINEAR	·	8.9 km	MPC · JPL
95458	2002 CD_{307}	—	February 8, 2002	Socorro	LINEAR	·	3.0 km	MPC · JPL
95459	2002 CF_{307}	—	February 8, 2002	Socorro	LINEAR	V	1.4 km	MPC · JPL
95460	2002 DR	—	February 17, 2002	Oaxaca	Roe, J. M.	NYS	2.4 km	MPC · JPL
95461	2002 DZ_{2}	—	February 21, 2002	Fountain Hills	C. W. Juels, P. R. Holvorcem	·	6.6 km	MPC · JPL
95462	2002 DK_{5}	—	February 16, 2002	Haleakala	NEAT	·	3.4 km	MPC · JPL
95463	2002 DS_{5}	—	February 16, 2002	Kitt Peak	Spacewatch	·	2.5 km	MPC · JPL
95464	2002 DY_{7}	—	February 19, 2002	Socorro	LINEAR	·	2.3 km	MPC · JPL
95465	2002 DR_{8}	—	February 19, 2002	Socorro	LINEAR	EUP	8.8 km	MPC · JPL
95466	2002 DB_{10}	—	February 19, 2002	Socorro	LINEAR	THB	7.6 km	MPC · JPL
95467	2002 DP_{10}	—	February 20, 2002	Socorro	LINEAR	·	2.6 km	MPC · JPL
95468	2002 DT_{10}	—	February 20, 2002	Anderson Mesa	LONEOS	PHO	2.9 km	MPC · JPL
95469	2002 DS_{18}	—	February 22, 2002	Palomar	NEAT	·	3.9 km	MPC · JPL
95470	2002 DW_{18}	—	February 20, 2002	Socorro	LINEAR	·	2.7 km	MPC · JPL
95471	2002 EE	—	March 3, 2002	Farpoint	G. Hug	·	4.6 km	MPC · JPL
95472	2002 EG_{1}	—	March 5, 2002	Farpoint	Farpoint	EUN	2.6 km	MPC · JPL
95473	2002 EX_{2}	—	March 6, 2002	Socorro	LINEAR	·	3.4 km	MPC · JPL
95474 Andreajbarbieri	2002 EE_{4}	Andreajbarbieri	March 10, 2002	Cima Ekar	ADAS	·	2.4 km	MPC · JPL
95475	2002 EB_{5}	—	March 10, 2002	Cima Ekar	ADAS	·	5.4 km	MPC · JPL
95476	2002 EY_{7}	—	March 11, 2002	Palomar	NEAT	·	2.7 km	MPC · JPL
95477	2002 ED_{11}	—	March 14, 2002	Desert Eagle	W. K. Y. Yeung	·	9.5 km	MPC · JPL
95478	2002 EK_{12}	—	March 14, 2002	Desert Eagle	W. K. Y. Yeung	(22805)	7.5 km	MPC · JPL
95479	2002 ET_{13}	—	March 3, 2002	Haleakala	NEAT	GEF	2.6 km	MPC · JPL
95480	2002 ER_{15}	—	March 5, 2002	Haleakala	NEAT	·	2.1 km	MPC · JPL
95481	2002 EG_{16}	—	March 6, 2002	Palomar	NEAT	GEF	2.4 km	MPC · JPL
95482	2002 EB_{19}	—	March 6, 2002	Palomar	NEAT	·	5.0 km	MPC · JPL
95483	2002 EE_{19}	—	March 9, 2002	Palomar	NEAT	·	8.9 km	MPC · JPL
95484	2002 EF_{22}	—	March 10, 2002	Haleakala	NEAT	HOF	6.0 km	MPC · JPL
95485	2002 ES_{22}	—	March 10, 2002	Haleakala	NEAT	·	3.9 km	MPC · JPL
95486	2002 ED_{23}	—	March 5, 2002	Kitt Peak	Spacewatch	·	3.7 km	MPC · JPL
95487	2002 ER_{24}	—	March 5, 2002	Kitt Peak	Spacewatch	·	3.9 km	MPC · JPL
95488	2002 EV_{25}	—	March 10, 2002	Anderson Mesa	LONEOS	KOR	3.2 km	MPC · JPL
95489	2002 EK_{29}	—	March 9, 2002	Socorro	LINEAR	·	2.2 km	MPC · JPL
95490	2002 EX_{29}	—	March 9, 2002	Socorro	LINEAR	·	7.6 km	MPC · JPL
95491	2002 EK_{30}	—	March 9, 2002	Socorro	LINEAR	AGN	3.1 km	MPC · JPL
95492	2002 EQ_{30}	—	March 9, 2002	Socorro	LINEAR	·	2.8 km	MPC · JPL
95493	2002 ES_{30}	—	March 9, 2002	Socorro	LINEAR	MAR	3.0 km	MPC · JPL
95494	2002 ES_{31}	—	March 11, 2002	Socorro	LINEAR	·	5.4 km	MPC · JPL
95495	2002 EK_{32}	—	March 10, 2002	Haleakala	NEAT	·	3.6 km	MPC · JPL
95496	2002 ET_{34}	—	March 11, 2002	Palomar	NEAT	·	2.7 km	MPC · JPL
95497	2002 EB_{35}	—	March 11, 2002	Palomar	NEAT	URS	6.5 km	MPC · JPL
95498	2002 EG_{35}	—	March 11, 2002	Haleakala	NEAT	·	9.2 km	MPC · JPL
95499	2002 ED_{38}	—	March 10, 2002	Kitt Peak	Spacewatch	·	3.5 km	MPC · JPL
95500	2002 EJ_{41}	—	March 11, 2002	Socorro	LINEAR	·	5.6 km	MPC · JPL

== 95501–95600 ==
back to top

Designation			Discovery			Properties		Ref
Permanent	Provisional	Named after	Date	Site	Discoverer(s)	Category	Diam.	Ref
95501	2002 EK_{41}	—	March 11, 2002	Socorro	LINEAR	·	6.1 km	MPC · JPL
95502	2002 EA_{43}	—	March 12, 2002	Socorro	LINEAR	HOF	5.2 km	MPC · JPL
95503	2002 EE_{43}	—	March 12, 2002	Socorro	LINEAR	HYG	7.1 km	MPC · JPL
95504	2002 EC_{45}	—	March 10, 2002	Haleakala	NEAT	·	3.5 km	MPC · JPL
95505	2002 EM_{45}	—	March 11, 2002	Palomar	NEAT	VER	5.6 km	MPC · JPL
95506	2002 EH_{48}	—	March 12, 2002	Palomar	NEAT	·	2.4 km	MPC · JPL
95507	2002 EO_{48}	—	March 12, 2002	Palomar	NEAT	·	5.3 km	MPC · JPL
95508	2002 EU_{49}	—	March 12, 2002	Palomar	NEAT	·	3.2 km	MPC · JPL
95509	2002 ER_{50}	—	March 12, 2002	Palomar	NEAT	·	3.3 km	MPC · JPL
95510	2002 EL_{51}	—	March 12, 2002	Kitt Peak	Spacewatch	(12739)	3.1 km	MPC · JPL
95511	2002 EB_{52}	—	March 9, 2002	Socorro	LINEAR	·	3.9 km	MPC · JPL
95512	2002 EH_{52}	—	March 9, 2002	Socorro	LINEAR	·	3.7 km	MPC · JPL
95513	2002 ER_{52}	—	March 9, 2002	Socorro	LINEAR	PAD	3.7 km	MPC · JPL
95514	2002 EZ_{54}	—	March 9, 2002	Socorro	LINEAR	·	4.0 km	MPC · JPL
95515	2002 EW_{56}	—	March 13, 2002	Socorro	LINEAR	KOR	2.7 km	MPC · JPL
95516	2002 EA_{57}	—	March 13, 2002	Socorro	LINEAR	PAD	4.4 km	MPC · JPL
95517	2002 EO_{60}	—	March 13, 2002	Socorro	LINEAR	·	3.3 km	MPC · JPL
95518	2002 EF_{61}	—	March 13, 2002	Socorro	LINEAR	LUT	7.5 km	MPC · JPL
95519	2002 EB_{63}	—	March 13, 2002	Socorro	LINEAR	·	4.1 km	MPC · JPL
95520	2002 ED_{67}	—	March 13, 2002	Socorro	LINEAR	·	2.6 km	MPC · JPL
95521	2002 ER_{68}	—	March 13, 2002	Socorro	LINEAR	KOR	2.7 km	MPC · JPL
95522	2002 EQ_{69}	—	March 13, 2002	Socorro	LINEAR	·	2.9 km	MPC · JPL
95523	2002 EK_{70}	—	March 13, 2002	Socorro	LINEAR	·	6.6 km	MPC · JPL
95524	2002 EN_{70}	—	March 13, 2002	Socorro	LINEAR	·	3.8 km	MPC · JPL
95525	2002 EZ_{70}	—	March 13, 2002	Socorro	LINEAR	·	4.1 km	MPC · JPL
95526	2002 EA_{72}	—	March 13, 2002	Socorro	LINEAR	HYG	5.4 km	MPC · JPL
95527	2002 EN_{73}	—	March 13, 2002	Socorro	LINEAR	·	3.7 km	MPC · JPL
95528	2002 EX_{73}	—	March 13, 2002	Socorro	LINEAR	·	3.5 km	MPC · JPL
95529	2002 EZ_{73}	—	March 13, 2002	Socorro	LINEAR	·	5.0 km	MPC · JPL
95530	2002 EF_{75}	—	March 13, 2002	Socorro	LINEAR	CYB	7.4 km	MPC · JPL
95531	2002 EN_{75}	—	March 14, 2002	Palomar	NEAT	·	1.4 km	MPC · JPL
95532	2002 EA_{76}	—	March 14, 2002	Palomar	NEAT	VER	5.9 km	MPC · JPL
95533	2002 EB_{76}	—	March 14, 2002	Palomar	NEAT	AEO	1.8 km	MPC · JPL
95534	2002 EL_{78}	—	March 11, 2002	Kitt Peak	Spacewatch	(18466)	3.4 km	MPC · JPL
95535	2002 EK_{82}	—	March 13, 2002	Palomar	NEAT	EOS	3.4 km	MPC · JPL
95536	2002 EB_{83}	—	March 13, 2002	Palomar	NEAT	·	3.1 km	MPC · JPL
95537	2002 EV_{83}	—	March 9, 2002	Socorro	LINEAR	·	5.7 km	MPC · JPL
95538	2002 EC_{84}	—	March 9, 2002	Socorro	LINEAR	HYG	4.1 km	MPC · JPL
95539	2002 EH_{84}	—	March 9, 2002	Socorro	LINEAR	·	3.4 km	MPC · JPL
95540	2002 EC_{86}	—	March 9, 2002	Socorro	LINEAR	·	3.4 km	MPC · JPL
95541	2002 EK_{86}	—	March 9, 2002	Socorro	LINEAR	·	3.6 km	MPC · JPL
95542	2002 EU_{86}	—	March 9, 2002	Socorro	LINEAR	·	8.4 km	MPC · JPL
95543	2002 ED_{87}	—	March 9, 2002	Socorro	LINEAR	·	6.9 km	MPC · JPL
95544	2002 EG_{87}	—	March 9, 2002	Socorro	LINEAR	·	2.5 km	MPC · JPL
95545	2002 EA_{88}	—	March 9, 2002	Socorro	LINEAR	·	4.5 km	MPC · JPL
95546	2002 EE_{88}	—	March 9, 2002	Socorro	LINEAR	KOR	2.8 km	MPC · JPL
95547	2002 EK_{88}	—	March 9, 2002	Socorro	LINEAR	·	2.5 km	MPC · JPL
95548	2002 EX_{88}	—	March 9, 2002	Socorro	LINEAR	·	2.4 km	MPC · JPL
95549	2002 EK_{89}	—	March 12, 2002	Socorro	LINEAR	·	7.5 km	MPC · JPL
95550	2002 ET_{89}	—	March 12, 2002	Socorro	LINEAR	·	7.1 km	MPC · JPL
95551	2002 EB_{93}	—	March 14, 2002	Socorro	LINEAR	·	4.9 km	MPC · JPL
95552	2002 EU_{93}	—	March 14, 2002	Socorro	LINEAR	PAD	4.5 km	MPC · JPL
95553	2002 EU_{94}	—	March 14, 2002	Socorro	LINEAR	PAD	3.4 km	MPC · JPL
95554	2002 EZ_{94}	—	March 14, 2002	Socorro	LINEAR	·	4.2 km	MPC · JPL
95555	2002 EZ_{96}	—	March 14, 2002	Palomar	NEAT	·	4.4 km	MPC · JPL
95556	2002 EA_{97}	—	March 14, 2002	Palomar	NEAT	EOS	3.9 km	MPC · JPL
95557	2002 EB_{97}	—	March 14, 2002	Palomar	NEAT	·	6.9 km	MPC · JPL
95558	2002 EF_{97}	—	March 11, 2002	Socorro	LINEAR	EUP	9.9 km	MPC · JPL
95559	2002 EK_{98}	—	March 12, 2002	Socorro	LINEAR	·	4.4 km	MPC · JPL
95560	2002 EX_{98}	—	March 15, 2002	Socorro	LINEAR	·	3.9 km	MPC · JPL
95561	2002 EV_{100}	—	March 5, 2002	Haleakala	NEAT	EOS	3.8 km	MPC · JPL
95562	2002 ES_{101}	—	March 6, 2002	Socorro	LINEAR	·	5.1 km	MPC · JPL
95563	2002 EU_{101}	—	March 6, 2002	Socorro	LINEAR	·	6.6 km	MPC · JPL
95564	2002 EL_{102}	—	March 6, 2002	Catalina	CSS	·	4.3 km	MPC · JPL
95565	2002 EL_{106}	—	March 9, 2002	Anderson Mesa	LONEOS	·	6.1 km	MPC · JPL
95566	2002 EC_{108}	—	March 9, 2002	Palomar	NEAT	·	4.7 km	MPC · JPL
95567	2002 EN_{108}	—	March 9, 2002	Palomar	NEAT	THM	5.5 km	MPC · JPL
95568	2002 EZ_{108}	—	March 9, 2002	Kitt Peak	Spacewatch	·	4.2 km	MPC · JPL
95569	2002 EC_{114}	—	March 10, 2002	Kitt Peak	Spacewatch	L4	14 km	MPC · JPL
95570	2002 ED_{115}	—	March 10, 2002	Anderson Mesa	LONEOS	·	4.9 km	MPC · JPL
95571	2002 EC_{125}	—	March 12, 2002	Palomar	NEAT	·	3.5 km	MPC · JPL
95572	2002 EJ_{130}	—	March 12, 2002	Anderson Mesa	LONEOS	TIR	8.2 km	MPC · JPL
95573	2002 EW_{130}	—	March 12, 2002	Palomar	NEAT	·	2.6 km	MPC · JPL
95574	2002 EQ_{139}	—	March 12, 2002	Palomar	NEAT	·	3.2 km	MPC · JPL
95575	2002 ER_{140}	—	March 12, 2002	Palomar	NEAT	·	3.6 km	MPC · JPL
95576	2002 EQ_{142}	—	March 12, 2002	Palomar	NEAT	KOR	2.8 km	MPC · JPL
95577	2002 EJ_{146}	—	March 14, 2002	Palomar	NEAT	EUN	3.8 km	MPC · JPL
95578	2002 EX_{146}	—	March 14, 2002	Palomar	NEAT	·	2.5 km	MPC · JPL
95579	2002 EB_{148}	—	March 15, 2002	Palomar	NEAT	·	5.9 km	MPC · JPL
95580	2002 EA_{153}	—	March 15, 2002	Palomar	NEAT	EOS	4.5 km	MPC · JPL
95581	2002 EH_{153}	—	March 15, 2002	Palomar	NEAT	EOS	4.7 km	MPC · JPL
95582	2002 EJ_{153}	—	March 15, 2002	Palomar	NEAT	·	6.1 km	MPC · JPL
95583	2002 ES_{155}	—	March 9, 2002	Anderson Mesa	LONEOS	WIT	1.9 km	MPC · JPL
95584	2002 FK_{2}	—	March 19, 2002	Desert Eagle	W. K. Y. Yeung	AGN	3.0 km	MPC · JPL
95585	2002 FV_{3}	—	March 20, 2002	Desert Eagle	W. K. Y. Yeung	·	5.4 km	MPC · JPL
95586	2002 FN_{8}	—	March 16, 2002	Socorro	LINEAR	·	5.6 km	MPC · JPL
95587	2002 FB_{9}	—	March 16, 2002	Socorro	LINEAR	GEF	2.5 km	MPC · JPL
95588	2002 FF_{9}	—	March 16, 2002	Socorro	LINEAR	·	4.3 km	MPC · JPL
95589	2002 FN_{9}	—	March 16, 2002	Socorro	LINEAR	·	6.6 km	MPC · JPL
95590	2002 FQ_{9}	—	March 16, 2002	Socorro	LINEAR	·	6.6 km	MPC · JPL
95591	2002 FX_{9}	—	March 16, 2002	Socorro	LINEAR	EUN	2.1 km	MPC · JPL
95592	2002 FL_{10}	—	March 17, 2002	Socorro	LINEAR	·	5.0 km	MPC · JPL
95593 Ažusienis	2002 FU_{10}	Ažusienis	March 16, 2002	Moletai	K. Černis, Zdanavicius, J.	·	5.9 km	MPC · JPL
95594	2002 FS_{13}	—	March 16, 2002	Haleakala	NEAT	·	8.9 km	MPC · JPL
95595	2002 FE_{15}	—	March 16, 2002	Haleakala	NEAT	·	8.5 km	MPC · JPL
95596	2002 FL_{16}	—	March 16, 2002	Haleakala	NEAT	·	7.6 km	MPC · JPL
95597	2002 FB_{21}	—	March 19, 2002	Anderson Mesa	LONEOS	WAT	4.1 km	MPC · JPL
95598	2002 FK_{24}	—	March 19, 2002	Palomar	NEAT	PHO	2.1 km	MPC · JPL
95599	2002 FZ_{26}	—	March 20, 2002	Socorro	LINEAR	EOS	4.4 km	MPC · JPL
95600	2002 FK_{27}	—	March 20, 2002	Socorro	LINEAR	·	4.3 km	MPC · JPL

== 95601–95700 ==
back to top

Designation			Discovery			Properties		Ref
Permanent	Provisional	Named after	Date	Site	Discoverer(s)	Category	Diam.	Ref
95601	2002 FJ_{28}	—	March 20, 2002	Palomar	NEAT	EOS	4.1 km	MPC · JPL
95602	2002 FB_{29}	—	March 20, 2002	Socorro	LINEAR	·	9.8 km	MPC · JPL
95603	2002 FT_{29}	—	March 20, 2002	Socorro	LINEAR	·	6.7 km	MPC · JPL
95604	2002 FG_{30}	—	March 20, 2002	Socorro	LINEAR	·	3.9 km	MPC · JPL
95605	2002 FL_{30}	—	March 20, 2002	Socorro	LINEAR	EOS	3.9 km	MPC · JPL
95606	2002 FW_{30}	—	March 20, 2002	Palomar	NEAT	·	5.4 km	MPC · JPL
95607	2002 FZ_{31}	—	March 20, 2002	Anderson Mesa	LONEOS	·	4.6 km	MPC · JPL
95608	2002 FL_{34}	—	March 20, 2002	Anderson Mesa	LONEOS	·	2.9 km	MPC · JPL
95609	2002 FN_{34}	—	March 20, 2002	Anderson Mesa	LONEOS	·	3.1 km	MPC · JPL
95610	2002 FQ_{34}	—	March 20, 2002	Anderson Mesa	LONEOS	GEF	2.5 km	MPC · JPL
95611	2002 FS_{34}	—	March 20, 2002	Anderson Mesa	LONEOS	·	5.0 km	MPC · JPL
95612	2002 FA_{35}	—	March 20, 2002	Kitt Peak	Spacewatch	·	4.9 km	MPC · JPL
95613	2002 FG_{37}	—	March 30, 2002	Palomar	NEAT	·	3.1 km	MPC · JPL
95614	2002 FQ_{37}	—	March 31, 2002	Palomar	NEAT	·	5.0 km	MPC · JPL
95615	2002 FY_{38}	—	March 31, 2002	Palomar	NEAT	·	4.7 km	MPC · JPL
95616	2002 GJ_{7}	—	April 14, 2002	Desert Eagle	W. K. Y. Yeung	(5)	1.8 km	MPC · JPL
95617	2002 GP_{7}	—	April 14, 2002	Desert Eagle	W. K. Y. Yeung	·	3.9 km	MPC · JPL
95618	2002 GW_{7}	—	April 14, 2002	Desert Eagle	W. K. Y. Yeung	·	8.5 km	MPC · JPL
95619	2002 GZ_{7}	—	April 14, 2002	Desert Eagle	W. K. Y. Yeung	·	5.8 km	MPC · JPL
95620	2002 GC_{9}	—	April 14, 2002	Desert Eagle	W. K. Y. Yeung	·	6.9 km	MPC · JPL
95621	2002 GP_{14}	—	April 15, 2002	Socorro	LINEAR	·	5.9 km	MPC · JPL
95622	2002 GU_{18}	—	April 14, 2002	Socorro	LINEAR	EOS	4.9 km	MPC · JPL
95623	2002 GT_{23}	—	April 15, 2002	Palomar	NEAT	·	1.8 km	MPC · JPL
95624	2002 GP_{24}	—	April 13, 2002	Kitt Peak	Spacewatch	·	2.5 km	MPC · JPL
95625	2002 GX_{32}	—	April 8, 2002	Cerro Tololo	M. W. Buie, A. B. Jordan, J. L. Elliot	res · 3:7	132 km	MPC · JPL
95626	2002 GZ_{32}	—	April 13, 2002	Mauna Kea	Mauna Kea	centaur	230 km	MPC · JPL
95627	2002 GK_{34}	—	April 1, 2002	Palomar	NEAT	·	2.5 km	MPC · JPL
95628	2002 GA_{35}	—	April 2, 2002	Palomar	NEAT	TIR	6.9 km	MPC · JPL
95629	2002 GM_{35}	—	April 2, 2002	Kitt Peak	Spacewatch	·	8.1 km	MPC · JPL
95630	2002 GY_{35}	—	April 2, 2002	Kitt Peak	Spacewatch	·	4.4 km	MPC · JPL
95631	2002 GR_{37}	—	April 3, 2002	Kitt Peak	Spacewatch	·	2.7 km	MPC · JPL
95632	2002 GO_{42}	—	April 4, 2002	Palomar	NEAT	KOR	2.8 km	MPC · JPL
95633	2002 GX_{42}	—	April 4, 2002	Palomar	NEAT	EOS	3.3 km	MPC · JPL
95634	2002 GO_{48}	—	April 4, 2002	Haleakala	NEAT	·	2.7 km	MPC · JPL
95635	2002 GC_{51}	—	April 5, 2002	Anderson Mesa	LONEOS	·	3.4 km	MPC · JPL
95636	2002 GA_{55}	—	April 5, 2002	Palomar	NEAT	EOS	3.7 km	MPC · JPL
95637	2002 GQ_{55}	—	April 5, 2002	Anderson Mesa	LONEOS	·	4.6 km	MPC · JPL
95638	2002 GP_{63}	—	April 8, 2002	Palomar	NEAT	THM	4.5 km	MPC · JPL
95639	2002 GE_{67}	—	April 8, 2002	Kitt Peak	Spacewatch	·	2.8 km	MPC · JPL
95640	2002 GC_{80}	—	April 10, 2002	Socorro	LINEAR	fast	5.2 km	MPC · JPL
95641	2002 GS_{81}	—	April 10, 2002	Socorro	LINEAR	EOS · fast	3.8 km	MPC · JPL
95642	2002 GV_{82}	—	April 10, 2002	Socorro	LINEAR	VER	6.4 km	MPC · JPL
95643	2002 GT_{83}	—	April 10, 2002	Socorro	LINEAR	EOS	3.6 km	MPC · JPL
95644	2002 GC_{88}	—	April 10, 2002	Socorro	LINEAR	GEF	2.8 km	MPC · JPL
95645	2002 GR_{88}	—	April 10, 2002	Socorro	LINEAR	·	5.8 km	MPC · JPL
95646	2002 GX_{93}	—	April 9, 2002	Socorro	LINEAR	GEF	3.0 km	MPC · JPL
95647	2002 GO_{95}	—	April 9, 2002	Socorro	LINEAR	·	10 km	MPC · JPL
95648	2002 GX_{97}	—	April 10, 2002	Socorro	LINEAR	·	5.9 km	MPC · JPL
95649	2002 GX_{98}	—	April 10, 2002	Socorro	LINEAR	·	6.0 km	MPC · JPL
95650	2002 GA_{99}	—	April 10, 2002	Socorro	LINEAR	EOS	4.0 km	MPC · JPL
95651	2002 GQ_{101}	—	April 10, 2002	Socorro	LINEAR	·	5.8 km	MPC · JPL
95652	2002 GF_{102}	—	April 10, 2002	Socorro	LINEAR	·	8.3 km	MPC · JPL
95653	2002 GM_{106}	—	April 11, 2002	Anderson Mesa	LONEOS	NAE	5.2 km	MPC · JPL
95654	2002 GG_{107}	—	April 11, 2002	Socorro	LINEAR	HOF	5.5 km	MPC · JPL
95655	2002 GL_{108}	—	April 11, 2002	Socorro	LINEAR	EOS	4.0 km	MPC · JPL
95656	2002 GL_{109}	—	April 11, 2002	Palomar	NEAT	·	4.1 km	MPC · JPL
95657	2002 GX_{109}	—	April 9, 2002	Socorro	LINEAR	EOS	3.8 km	MPC · JPL
95658	2002 GF_{115}	—	April 11, 2002	Socorro	LINEAR	EOS	3.6 km	MPC · JPL
95659	2002 GF_{123}	—	April 10, 2002	Socorro	LINEAR	·	3.1 km	MPC · JPL
95660	2002 GE_{125}	—	April 12, 2002	Socorro	LINEAR	·	4.6 km	MPC · JPL
95661	2002 GX_{125}	—	April 12, 2002	Socorro	LINEAR	·	3.6 km	MPC · JPL
95662	2002 GE_{132}	—	April 12, 2002	Socorro	LINEAR	·	3.8 km	MPC · JPL
95663	2002 GB_{133}	—	April 12, 2002	Socorro	LINEAR	·	2.1 km	MPC · JPL
95664	2002 GD_{136}	—	April 12, 2002	Socorro	LINEAR	·	3.9 km	MPC · JPL
95665	2002 GO_{139}	—	April 13, 2002	Needville	P. G. A. Garossino, A. Cruz	·	2.9 km	MPC · JPL
95666	2002 GZ_{141}	—	April 13, 2002	Palomar	NEAT	·	5.0 km	MPC · JPL
95667	2002 GO_{146}	—	April 13, 2002	Palomar	NEAT	·	3.4 km	MPC · JPL
95668	2002 GT_{160}	—	April 15, 2002	Palomar	NEAT	·	3.5 km	MPC · JPL
95669	2002 GE_{161}	—	April 15, 2002	Anderson Mesa	LONEOS	·	8.6 km	MPC · JPL
95670	2002 GR_{161}	—	April 14, 2002	Anderson Mesa	LONEOS	·	8.0 km	MPC · JPL
95671	2002 GC_{163}	—	April 14, 2002	Kitt Peak	Spacewatch	EOS	3.5 km	MPC · JPL
95672	2002 GX_{170}	—	April 10, 2002	Socorro	LINEAR	·	9.3 km	MPC · JPL
95673	2002 GY_{170}	—	April 10, 2002	Socorro	LINEAR	·	4.6 km	MPC · JPL
95674	2002 GW_{173}	—	April 10, 2002	Socorro	LINEAR	(1298)	7.3 km	MPC · JPL
95675	2002 GZ_{173}	—	April 10, 2002	Socorro	LINEAR	EUN	2.0 km	MPC · JPL
95676	2002 GR_{174}	—	April 11, 2002	Socorro	LINEAR	·	7.9 km	MPC · JPL
95677	2002 GJ_{177}	—	April 12, 2002	Palomar	White, M., M. Collins	·	2.1 km	MPC · JPL
95678	2002 HM	—	April 16, 2002	Desert Eagle	W. K. Y. Yeung	EOS	4.1 km	MPC · JPL
95679	2002 HX	—	April 16, 2002	Socorro	LINEAR	·	9.7 km	MPC · JPL
95680	2002 HU_{2}	—	April 16, 2002	Socorro	LINEAR	HOF	6.3 km	MPC · JPL
95681	2002 HP_{9}	—	April 17, 2002	Socorro	LINEAR	EOS	4.3 km	MPC · JPL
95682	2002 HZ_{16}	—	April 19, 2002	Kitt Peak	Spacewatch	·	2.8 km	MPC · JPL
95683	2002 JA	—	May 2, 2002	Siding Spring	R. H. McNaught	·	3.3 km	MPC · JPL
95684	2002 JN_{14}	—	May 7, 2002	Socorro	LINEAR	·	2.9 km	MPC · JPL
95685	2002 JW_{20}	—	May 8, 2002	Haleakala	NEAT	URS	6.3 km	MPC · JPL
95686	2002 JZ_{21}	—	May 6, 2002	Socorro	LINEAR	·	7.3 km	MPC · JPL
95687	2002 JK_{23}	—	May 8, 2002	Socorro	LINEAR	·	4.0 km	MPC · JPL
95688	2002 JO_{25}	—	May 8, 2002	Socorro	LINEAR	·	8.8 km	MPC · JPL
95689	2002 JG_{40}	—	May 8, 2002	Socorro	LINEAR	·	3.6 km	MPC · JPL
95690	2002 JG_{44}	—	May 9, 2002	Socorro	LINEAR	·	6.0 km	MPC · JPL
95691	2002 JK_{46}	—	May 9, 2002	Socorro	LINEAR	THM	4.4 km	MPC · JPL
95692	2002 JD_{62}	—	May 8, 2002	Socorro	LINEAR	·	6.6 km	MPC · JPL
95693	2002 JA_{70}	—	May 7, 2002	Socorro	LINEAR	·	9.4 km	MPC · JPL
95694	2002 JS_{70}	—	May 8, 2002	Socorro	LINEAR	HNS	3.3 km	MPC · JPL
95695	2002 JV_{70}	—	May 8, 2002	Socorro	LINEAR	·	8.2 km	MPC · JPL
95696	2002 JU_{75}	—	May 11, 2002	Socorro	LINEAR	·	3.1 km	MPC · JPL
95697	2002 JQ_{77}	—	May 11, 2002	Socorro	LINEAR	·	4.0 km	MPC · JPL
95698	2002 JM_{79}	—	May 11, 2002	Socorro	LINEAR	EUN	3.6 km	MPC · JPL
95699	2002 JA_{84}	—	May 11, 2002	Socorro	LINEAR	VER	5.3 km	MPC · JPL
95700	2002 JP_{88}	—	May 11, 2002	Socorro	LINEAR	TEL	2.0 km	MPC · JPL

== 95701–95800 ==
back to top

Designation			Discovery			Properties		Ref
Permanent	Provisional	Named after	Date	Site	Discoverer(s)	Category	Diam.	Ref
95701	2002 JH_{109}	—	May 11, 2002	Socorro	LINEAR	·	8.6 km	MPC · JPL
95702	2002 JY_{112}	—	May 13, 2002	Socorro	LINEAR	·	8.4 km	MPC · JPL
95703	2002 JY_{122}	—	May 6, 2002	Palomar	NEAT	·	6.7 km	MPC · JPL
95704	2002 JS_{124}	—	May 6, 2002	Palomar	NEAT	slow	4.3 km	MPC · JPL
95705	2002 JA_{133}	—	May 9, 2002	Socorro	LINEAR	EOS	4.1 km	MPC · JPL
95706	2002 JQ_{135}	—	May 9, 2002	Socorro	LINEAR	EOS	3.9 km	MPC · JPL
95707	2002 KZ_{1}	—	May 16, 2002	Socorro	LINEAR	HNS	2.5 km	MPC · JPL
95708	2002 KM_{2}	—	May 17, 2002	Palomar	NEAT	HOF	6.9 km	MPC · JPL
95709	2002 LM_{3}	—	June 3, 2002	Socorro	LINEAR	·	6.6 km	MPC · JPL
95710	2002 UJ_{38}	—	October 31, 2002	Needville	J. Dellinger, W. G. Dillon	·	1.4 km	MPC · JPL
95711	2003 AK	—	January 1, 2003	Socorro	LINEAR	slow	2.6 km	MPC · JPL
95712	2003 AT_{2}	—	January 2, 2003	Socorro	LINEAR	H	1.3 km	MPC · JPL
95713	2003 AJ_{60}	—	January 5, 2003	Socorro	LINEAR	·	3.9 km	MPC · JPL
95714	2003 AB_{80}	—	January 12, 2003	Kitt Peak	Spacewatch	EUN	2.1 km	MPC · JPL
95715	2003 BJ_{17}	—	January 26, 2003	Haleakala	NEAT	·	2.7 km	MPC · JPL
95716	2003 BS_{20}	—	January 27, 2003	Socorro	LINEAR	·	3.8 km	MPC · JPL
95717	2003 BK_{25}	—	January 25, 2003	Palomar	NEAT	·	2.4 km	MPC · JPL
95718	2003 BX_{26}	—	January 26, 2003	Anderson Mesa	LONEOS	·	1.3 km	MPC · JPL
95719	2003 BG_{35}	—	January 27, 2003	Socorro	LINEAR	·	1.8 km	MPC · JPL
95720	2003 BZ_{62}	—	January 28, 2003	Socorro	LINEAR	·	2.5 km	MPC · JPL
95721	2003 CT_{7}	—	February 1, 2003	Socorro	LINEAR	·	3.6 km	MPC · JPL
95722	2003 CG_{13}	—	February 3, 2003	Haleakala	NEAT	·	5.7 km	MPC · JPL
95723	2003 CP_{13}	—	February 4, 2003	Anderson Mesa	LONEOS	·	3.6 km	MPC · JPL
95724	2003 CH_{15}	—	February 4, 2003	Anderson Mesa	LONEOS	·	5.0 km	MPC · JPL
95725	2003 CR_{17}	—	February 6, 2003	Kitt Peak	Spacewatch	·	2.5 km	MPC · JPL
95726	2003 CO_{18}	—	February 6, 2003	Kitt Peak	Spacewatch	·	2.1 km	MPC · JPL
95727	2003 DV_{5}	—	February 21, 2003	Palomar	NEAT	·	2.6 km	MPC · JPL
95728	2003 DZ_{13}	—	February 26, 2003	Haleakala	NEAT	·	2.5 km	MPC · JPL
95729	2003 DJ_{15}	—	February 26, 2003	Socorro	LINEAR	·	3.1 km	MPC · JPL
95730	2003 DO_{18}	—	February 20, 2003	Haleakala	NEAT	NYS	1.9 km	MPC · JPL
95731	2003 DR_{20}	—	February 22, 2003	Palomar	NEAT	NYS	2.4 km	MPC · JPL
95732	2003 DS_{21}	—	February 28, 2003	Socorro	LINEAR	·	3.3 km	MPC · JPL
95733	2003 DG_{22}	—	February 28, 2003	Socorro	LINEAR	·	1.7 km	MPC · JPL
95734	2003 EJ_{4}	—	March 6, 2003	Desert Eagle	W. K. Y. Yeung	V	1.4 km	MPC · JPL
95735	2003 EW_{4}	—	March 6, 2003	Socorro	LINEAR	MAS	1.6 km	MPC · JPL
95736	2003 EX_{5}	—	March 5, 2003	Socorro	LINEAR	·	3.2 km	MPC · JPL
95737	2003 EN_{7}	—	March 6, 2003	Anderson Mesa	LONEOS	·	1.4 km	MPC · JPL
95738	2003 EH_{11}	—	March 6, 2003	Socorro	LINEAR	·	4.2 km	MPC · JPL
95739	2003 ES_{14}	—	March 6, 2003	Socorro	LINEAR	NYS	2.1 km	MPC · JPL
95740	2003 EB_{16}	—	March 7, 2003	Socorro	LINEAR	·	1.2 km	MPC · JPL
95741	2003 EC_{17}	—	March 9, 2003	Socorro	LINEAR	H	1.1 km	MPC · JPL
95742	2003 ES_{20}	—	March 6, 2003	Anderson Mesa	LONEOS	·	5.9 km	MPC · JPL
95743	2003 ET_{20}	—	March 6, 2003	Anderson Mesa	LONEOS	NYS ·	2.3 km	MPC · JPL
95744	2003 EZ_{20}	—	March 6, 2003	Anderson Mesa	LONEOS	·	4.0 km	MPC · JPL
95745	2003 EF_{22}	—	March 6, 2003	Socorro	LINEAR	·	2.4 km	MPC · JPL
95746	2003 EW_{22}	—	March 6, 2003	Socorro	LINEAR	NYS	2.3 km	MPC · JPL
95747	2003 EG_{23}	—	March 6, 2003	Socorro	LINEAR	·	3.1 km	MPC · JPL
95748	2003 ET_{24}	—	March 6, 2003	Socorro	LINEAR	·	2.9 km	MPC · JPL
95749	2003 EB_{25}	—	March 6, 2003	Anderson Mesa	LONEOS	·	2.0 km	MPC · JPL
95750	2003 ED_{28}	—	March 6, 2003	Socorro	LINEAR	·	2.3 km	MPC · JPL
95751	2003 EL_{28}	—	March 6, 2003	Socorro	LINEAR	·	2.9 km	MPC · JPL
95752	2003 ER_{28}	—	March 6, 2003	Socorro	LINEAR	·	1.6 km	MPC · JPL
95753	2003 EZ_{28}	—	March 6, 2003	Socorro	LINEAR	·	2.3 km	MPC · JPL
95754	2003 EV_{29}	—	March 6, 2003	Socorro	LINEAR	·	1.9 km	MPC · JPL
95755	2003 EC_{34}	—	March 7, 2003	Kitt Peak	Spacewatch	MAS	1.0 km	MPC · JPL
95756	2003 EK_{34}	—	March 7, 2003	Socorro	LINEAR	ERI	3.5 km	MPC · JPL
95757	2003 EZ_{34}	—	March 7, 2003	Socorro	LINEAR	·	2.4 km	MPC · JPL
95758	2003 EA_{35}	—	March 7, 2003	Socorro	LINEAR	RAF	1.8 km	MPC · JPL
95759	2003 EE_{37}	—	March 8, 2003	Anderson Mesa	LONEOS	·	3.1 km	MPC · JPL
95760 Protezionecivile	2003 EF_{41}	Protezionecivile	March 9, 2003	Campo Imperatore	CINEOS	·	1.7 km	MPC · JPL
95761	2003 EK_{41}	—	March 9, 2003	Socorro	LINEAR	NYS	2.0 km	MPC · JPL
95762	2003 EX_{43}	—	March 6, 2003	Socorro	LINEAR	·	1.6 km	MPC · JPL
95763	2003 EO_{44}	—	March 7, 2003	Anderson Mesa	LONEOS	·	1.4 km	MPC · JPL
95764	2003 EC_{46}	—	March 7, 2003	Socorro	LINEAR	·	1.8 km	MPC · JPL
95765	2003 ED_{46}	—	March 7, 2003	Socorro	LINEAR	·	2.6 km	MPC · JPL
95766	2003 EK_{46}	—	March 7, 2003	Anderson Mesa	LONEOS	·	2.6 km	MPC · JPL
95767	2003 EY_{46}	—	March 8, 2003	Anderson Mesa	LONEOS	·	7.1 km	MPC · JPL
95768	2003 EF_{47}	—	March 8, 2003	Socorro	LINEAR	H	1.6 km	MPC · JPL
95769	2003 EF_{48}	—	March 9, 2003	Anderson Mesa	LONEOS	·	3.7 km	MPC · JPL
95770	2003 EQ_{49}	—	March 10, 2003	Socorro	LINEAR	V	1.2 km	MPC · JPL
95771 Lachat	2003 EZ_{49}	Lachat	March 9, 2003	Vicques	M. Ory	·	3.0 km	MPC · JPL
95772	2003 EE_{52}	—	March 11, 2003	Palomar	NEAT	slow	2.2 km	MPC · JPL
95773	2003 EC_{53}	—	March 8, 2003	Anderson Mesa	LONEOS	PHO	2.7 km	MPC · JPL
95774	2003 EQ_{53}	—	March 9, 2003	Socorro	LINEAR	EUN	2.1 km	MPC · JPL
95775	2003 ET_{53}	—	March 10, 2003	Socorro	LINEAR	·	4.7 km	MPC · JPL
95776	2003 EM_{57}	—	March 9, 2003	Anderson Mesa	LONEOS	·	5.6 km	MPC · JPL
95777	2003 EW_{58}	—	March 11, 2003	Socorro	LINEAR	EUN	2.4 km	MPC · JPL
95778	2003 EB_{59}	—	March 12, 2003	Palomar	NEAT	PHO	4.4 km	MPC · JPL
95779	2003 EH_{59}	—	March 12, 2003	Socorro	LINEAR	H	3.7 km	MPC · JPL
95780	2003 EH_{60}	—	March 7, 2003	Goodricke-Pigott	R. A. Tucker	·	3.7 km	MPC · JPL
95781	2003 EO_{60}	—	March 12, 2003	Socorro	LINEAR	·	2.8 km	MPC · JPL
95782 Hansgraf	2003 FS_{3}	Hansgraf	March 24, 2003	Needville	J. Dellinger	JUN	1.6 km	MPC · JPL
95783 Marceloemilio	2003 FJ_{6}	Marceloemilio	March 27, 2003	Campo Imperatore	F. Bernardi	·	1.9 km	MPC · JPL
95784	2003 FS_{6}	—	March 28, 2003	La Silla	G. Masi	·	1.8 km	MPC · JPL
95785 Csányivilmos	2003 FV_{6}	Csányivilmos	March 27, 2003	Piszkéstető	K. Sárneczky	·	3.0 km	MPC · JPL
95786	2003 FN_{7}	—	March 29, 2003	Anderson Mesa	LONEOS	H	1.2 km	MPC · JPL
95787	2003 FJ_{12}	—	March 22, 2003	Palomar	NEAT	EUN	2.8 km	MPC · JPL
95788	2003 FL_{12}	—	March 22, 2003	Palomar	NEAT	·	2.3 km	MPC · JPL
95789	2003 FY_{15}	—	March 23, 2003	Palomar	NEAT	·	1.6 km	MPC · JPL
95790	2003 FA_{16}	—	March 23, 2003	Palomar	NEAT	·	3.4 km	MPC · JPL
95791	2003 FY_{18}	—	March 24, 2003	Kitt Peak	Spacewatch	MAS	1.3 km	MPC · JPL
95792	2003 FZ_{19}	—	March 23, 2003	Palomar	NEAT	·	2.2 km	MPC · JPL
95793 Brock	2003 FR_{20}	Brock	March 23, 2003	Catalina	CSS	·	2.6 km	MPC · JPL
95794	2003 FN_{21}	—	March 25, 2003	Kvistaberg	Uppsala-DLR Asteroid Survey	·	2.6 km	MPC · JPL
95795	2003 FT_{23}	—	March 23, 2003	Kitt Peak	Spacewatch	·	2.5 km	MPC · JPL
95796	2003 FM_{24}	—	March 23, 2003	Haleakala	NEAT	·	2.5 km	MPC · JPL
95797	2003 FC_{27}	—	March 24, 2003	Kitt Peak	Spacewatch	·	2.5 km	MPC · JPL
95798	2003 FX_{28}	—	March 24, 2003	Haleakala	NEAT	(18466)	3.9 km	MPC · JPL
95799	2003 FN_{30}	—	March 25, 2003	Haleakala	NEAT	GEF	2.5 km	MPC · JPL
95800	2003 FS_{30}	—	March 25, 2003	Haleakala	NEAT	·	6.8 km	MPC · JPL

== 95801–95900 ==
back to top

Designation			Discovery			Properties		Ref
Permanent	Provisional	Named after	Date	Site	Discoverer(s)	Category	Diam.	Ref
95801	2003 FZ_{41}	—	March 26, 2003	Kitt Peak	Spacewatch	KON	4.7 km	MPC · JPL
95802 Francismuir	2003 FM_{42}	Francismuir	March 31, 2003	Needville	J. Dellinger	·	3.0 km	MPC · JPL
95803	2003 FX_{45}	—	March 24, 2003	Kitt Peak	Spacewatch	·	1.8 km	MPC · JPL
95804	2003 FK_{47}	—	March 24, 2003	Kitt Peak	Spacewatch	NYS	2.1 km	MPC · JPL
95805	2003 FA_{50}	—	March 24, 2003	Haleakala	NEAT	·	3.8 km	MPC · JPL
95806	2003 FV_{51}	—	March 25, 2003	Haleakala	NEAT	·	9.5 km	MPC · JPL
95807	2003 FX_{51}	—	March 25, 2003	Palomar	NEAT	·	2.2 km	MPC · JPL
95808	2003 FQ_{52}	—	March 25, 2003	Palomar	NEAT	·	2.3 km	MPC · JPL
95809	2003 FA_{54}	—	March 25, 2003	Haleakala	NEAT	·	1.2 km	MPC · JPL
95810	2003 FS_{54}	—	March 25, 2003	Haleakala	NEAT	·	4.4 km	MPC · JPL
95811	2003 FB_{57}	—	March 26, 2003	Palomar	NEAT	·	3.0 km	MPC · JPL
95812	2003 FA_{59}	—	March 26, 2003	Palomar	NEAT	·	1.2 km	MPC · JPL
95813	2003 FW_{68}	—	March 26, 2003	Palomar	NEAT	NYS ·	2.3 km	MPC · JPL
95814	2003 FW_{69}	—	March 26, 2003	Kitt Peak	Spacewatch	·	2.7 km	MPC · JPL
95815	2003 FY_{73}	—	March 26, 2003	Haleakala	NEAT	·	3.4 km	MPC · JPL
95816	2003 FR_{74}	—	March 26, 2003	Palomar	NEAT	·	1.5 km	MPC · JPL
95817	2003 FC_{75}	—	March 26, 2003	Haleakala	NEAT	EUN	2.6 km	MPC · JPL
95818	2003 FW_{79}	—	March 27, 2003	Palomar	NEAT	·	1.8 km	MPC · JPL
95819	2003 FB_{80}	—	March 27, 2003	Palomar	NEAT	·	3.0 km	MPC · JPL
95820	2003 FL_{80}	—	March 27, 2003	Socorro	LINEAR	DOR	5.1 km	MPC · JPL
95821	2003 FJ_{82}	—	March 27, 2003	Palomar	NEAT	EUN	2.1 km	MPC · JPL
95822	2003 FM_{82}	—	March 27, 2003	Palomar	NEAT	·	2.0 km	MPC · JPL
95823	2003 FW_{82}	—	March 27, 2003	Palomar	NEAT	·	1.4 km	MPC · JPL
95824 Elger	2003 FP_{85}	Elger	March 28, 2003	Catalina	CSS	·	1.6 km	MPC · JPL
95825	2003 FJ_{86}	—	March 28, 2003	Kitt Peak	Spacewatch	·	2.4 km	MPC · JPL
95826	2003 FA_{87}	—	March 28, 2003	Kitt Peak	Spacewatch	·	2.4 km	MPC · JPL
95827	2003 FO_{88}	—	March 28, 2003	Kitt Peak	Spacewatch	·	1.6 km	MPC · JPL
95828	2003 FD_{90}	—	March 29, 2003	Anderson Mesa	LONEOS	·	1.9 km	MPC · JPL
95829	2003 FJ_{91}	—	March 29, 2003	Anderson Mesa	LONEOS	·	1.5 km	MPC · JPL
95830	2003 FN_{92}	—	March 29, 2003	Anderson Mesa	LONEOS	·	2.2 km	MPC · JPL
95831	2003 FP_{92}	—	March 29, 2003	Anderson Mesa	LONEOS	·	3.4 km	MPC · JPL
95832	2003 FQ_{98}	—	March 30, 2003	Socorro	LINEAR	·	2.6 km	MPC · JPL
95833	2003 FD_{99}	—	March 30, 2003	Socorro	LINEAR	NYS	2.3 km	MPC · JPL
95834	2003 FF_{101}	—	March 31, 2003	Socorro	LINEAR	·	2.2 km	MPC · JPL
95835	2003 FF_{103}	—	March 24, 2003	Kitt Peak	Spacewatch	·	3.7 km	MPC · JPL
95836	2003 FS_{104}	—	March 25, 2003	Haleakala	NEAT	·	2.6 km	MPC · JPL
95837	2003 FU_{105}	—	March 26, 2003	Palomar	NEAT	·	2.7 km	MPC · JPL
95838	2003 FJ_{107}	—	March 30, 2003	Socorro	LINEAR	V	1.9 km	MPC · JPL
95839	2003 FN_{107}	—	March 30, 2003	Socorro	LINEAR	V	1.8 km	MPC · JPL
95840	2003 FT_{107}	—	March 30, 2003	Socorro	LINEAR	·	4.4 km	MPC · JPL
95841	2003 FB_{109}	—	March 31, 2003	Anderson Mesa	LONEOS	·	3.3 km	MPC · JPL
95842	2003 FX_{111}	—	March 31, 2003	Socorro	LINEAR	·	3.1 km	MPC · JPL
95843	2003 FZ_{113}	—	March 31, 2003	Socorro	LINEAR	·	1.9 km	MPC · JPL
95844	2003 FE_{114}	—	March 31, 2003	Socorro	LINEAR	·	1.0 km	MPC · JPL
95845	2003 FS_{114}	—	March 31, 2003	Kitt Peak	Spacewatch	V	1.4 km	MPC · JPL
95846	2003 FZ_{115}	—	March 31, 2003	Kitt Peak	Spacewatch	·	5.8 km	MPC · JPL
95847	2003 FK_{118}	—	March 26, 2003	Anderson Mesa	LONEOS	·	3.7 km	MPC · JPL
95848	2003 FQ_{119}	—	March 26, 2003	Anderson Mesa	LONEOS	DOR	5.5 km	MPC · JPL
95849	2003 FZ_{120}	—	March 25, 2003	Anderson Mesa	LONEOS	·	2.1 km	MPC · JPL
95850	2003 FA_{122}	—	March 29, 2003	Anderson Mesa	LONEOS	·	6.7 km	MPC · JPL
95851 Stromvil	2003 FD_{123}	Stromvil	March 26, 2003	Moletai	K. Černis, Zdanavicius, K.	·	2.0 km	MPC · JPL
95852 Leatherbarrow	2003 FT_{127}	Leatherbarrow	March 31, 2003	Catalina	CSS	MAS	1.5 km	MPC · JPL
95853 Jamescarpenter	2003 FU_{127}	Jamescarpenter	March 31, 2003	Catalina	CSS	·	2.3 km	MPC · JPL
95854	2003 GD_{3}	—	April 1, 2003	Socorro	LINEAR	·	1.6 km	MPC · JPL
95855	2003 GD_{5}	—	April 1, 2003	Socorro	LINEAR	NYS	2.2 km	MPC · JPL
95856	2003 GG_{6}	—	April 1, 2003	Haleakala	NEAT	ADE	6.4 km	MPC · JPL
95857	2003 GV_{9}	—	April 2, 2003	Socorro	LINEAR	·	3.8 km	MPC · JPL
95858	2003 GW_{9}	—	April 2, 2003	Socorro	LINEAR	·	1.5 km	MPC · JPL
95859	2003 GG_{10}	—	April 2, 2003	Haleakala	NEAT	PHO	2.5 km	MPC · JPL
95860	2003 GC_{11}	—	April 2, 2003	Haleakala	NEAT	·	2.6 km	MPC · JPL
95861	2003 GU_{12}	—	April 1, 2003	Socorro	LINEAR	JUN	2.7 km	MPC · JPL
95862	2003 GK_{13}	—	April 3, 2003	Anderson Mesa	LONEOS	·	2.0 km	MPC · JPL
95863	2003 GE_{21}	—	April 5, 2003	Anderson Mesa	LONEOS	EUN	1.6 km	MPC · JPL
95864	2003 GC_{22}	—	April 6, 2003	Desert Eagle	W. K. Y. Yeung	·	4.0 km	MPC · JPL
95865	2003 GA_{23}	—	April 3, 2003	Anderson Mesa	LONEOS	fast	6.0 km	MPC · JPL
95866	2003 GM_{23}	—	April 4, 2003	Anderson Mesa	LONEOS	·	1.9 km	MPC · JPL
95867	2003 GO_{23}	—	April 4, 2003	Anderson Mesa	LONEOS	·	5.2 km	MPC · JPL
95868	2003 GB_{29}	—	April 4, 2003	Haleakala	NEAT	·	6.5 km	MPC · JPL
95869	2003 GC_{29}	—	April 5, 2003	Kitt Peak	Spacewatch	·	2.7 km	MPC · JPL
95870	2003 GE_{34}	—	April 5, 2003	Anderson Mesa	LONEOS	·	4.3 km	MPC · JPL
95871	2003 GY_{34}	—	April 8, 2003	Kvistaberg	Uppsala-DLR Asteroid Survey	·	2.7 km	MPC · JPL
95872	2003 GB_{36}	—	April 5, 2003	Anderson Mesa	LONEOS	·	3.4 km	MPC · JPL
95873	2003 GH_{37}	—	April 6, 2003	Kitt Peak	Spacewatch	·	2.2 km	MPC · JPL
95874	2003 GA_{44}	—	April 9, 2003	Socorro	LINEAR	PHO	2.1 km	MPC · JPL
95875	2003 GU_{44}	—	April 7, 2003	Socorro	LINEAR	MAS	1.5 km	MPC · JPL
95876	2003 GC_{46}	—	April 8, 2003	Palomar	NEAT	·	5.1 km	MPC · JPL
95877	2003 GT_{46}	—	April 8, 2003	Palomar	NEAT	·	2.9 km	MPC · JPL
95878	2003 GG_{50}	—	April 4, 2003	Kitt Peak	Spacewatch	·	2.9 km	MPC · JPL
95879	2003 GW_{50}	—	April 8, 2003	Haleakala	NEAT	·	4.7 km	MPC · JPL
95880	2003 GW_{53}	—	April 4, 2003	Kitt Peak	Spacewatch	·	4.7 km	MPC · JPL
95881	2003 HR	—	April 20, 2003	Haleakala	NEAT	·	2.3 km	MPC · JPL
95882 Longshaw	2003 HW	Longshaw	April 21, 2003	Catalina	CSS	·	1.7 km	MPC · JPL
95883	2003 HO_{3}	—	April 24, 2003	Anderson Mesa	LONEOS	·	3.6 km	MPC · JPL
95884	2003 HY_{3}	—	April 24, 2003	Anderson Mesa	LONEOS	ADE	4.1 km	MPC · JPL
95885	2003 HL_{4}	—	April 24, 2003	Anderson Mesa	LONEOS	·	3.8 km	MPC · JPL
95886	2003 HY_{4}	—	April 24, 2003	Anderson Mesa	LONEOS	·	5.5 km	MPC · JPL
95887	2003 HE_{5}	—	April 24, 2003	Kitt Peak	Spacewatch	NYS	3.3 km	MPC · JPL
95888	2003 HV_{8}	—	April 24, 2003	Anderson Mesa	LONEOS	·	2.8 km	MPC · JPL
95889	2003 HE_{9}	—	April 24, 2003	Anderson Mesa	LONEOS	·	2.1 km	MPC · JPL
95890	2003 HK_{9}	—	April 24, 2003	Haleakala	NEAT	·	2.4 km	MPC · JPL
95891	2003 HH_{10}	—	April 25, 2003	Kitt Peak	Spacewatch	·	2.2 km	MPC · JPL
95892	2003 HO_{11}	—	April 24, 2003	Anderson Mesa	LONEOS	PHO	2.4 km	MPC · JPL
95893	2003 HY_{11}	—	April 25, 2003	Anderson Mesa	LONEOS	·	4.7 km	MPC · JPL
95894	2003 HA_{12}	—	April 25, 2003	Anderson Mesa	LONEOS	·	6.1 km	MPC · JPL
95895 Sebastiano	2003 HF_{12}	Sebastiano	April 25, 2003	Campo Imperatore	S. Foglia, M. Tombelli	V	1.4 km	MPC · JPL
95896	2003 HH_{13}	—	April 24, 2003	Kitt Peak	Spacewatch	V	1.3 km	MPC · JPL
95897	2003 HZ_{14}	—	April 26, 2003	Haleakala	NEAT	V	1.5 km	MPC · JPL
95898	2003 HQ_{16}	—	April 28, 2003	Anderson Mesa	LONEOS	PHO	2.0 km	MPC · JPL
95899	2003 HZ_{20}	—	April 24, 2003	Anderson Mesa	LONEOS	·	1.6 km	MPC · JPL
95900	2003 HF_{21}	—	April 25, 2003	Kitt Peak	Spacewatch	·	1.7 km	MPC · JPL

== 95901–96000 ==
back to top

Designation			Discovery			Properties		Ref
Permanent	Provisional	Named after	Date	Site	Discoverer(s)	Category	Diam.	Ref
95901	2003 HY_{22}	—	April 26, 2003	Kitt Peak	Spacewatch	·	1.9 km	MPC · JPL
95902	2003 HL_{24}	—	April 28, 2003	Socorro	LINEAR	·	6.6 km	MPC · JPL
95903	2003 HC_{27}	—	April 27, 2003	Anderson Mesa	LONEOS	·	5.3 km	MPC · JPL
95904	2003 HO_{29}	—	April 28, 2003	Anderson Mesa	LONEOS	·	2.1 km	MPC · JPL
95905	2003 HE_{30}	—	April 28, 2003	Anderson Mesa	LONEOS	·	3.2 km	MPC · JPL
95906	2003 HJ_{30}	—	April 28, 2003	Anderson Mesa	LONEOS	·	4.9 km	MPC · JPL
95907	2003 HE_{31}	—	April 26, 2003	Kitt Peak	Spacewatch	·	1.9 km	MPC · JPL
95908	2003 HX_{31}	—	April 28, 2003	Socorro	LINEAR	·	2.2 km	MPC · JPL
95909	2003 HN_{32}	—	April 28, 2003	Socorro	LINEAR	·	4.0 km	MPC · JPL
95910	2003 HE_{36}	—	April 27, 2003	Anderson Mesa	LONEOS	·	2.9 km	MPC · JPL
95911	2003 HK_{39}	—	April 29, 2003	Socorro	LINEAR	V	1.5 km	MPC · JPL
95912	2003 HN_{40}	—	April 29, 2003	Socorro	LINEAR	·	5.1 km	MPC · JPL
95913	2003 HE_{41}	—	April 29, 2003	Socorro	LINEAR	·	5.3 km	MPC · JPL
95914	2003 HT_{41}	—	April 29, 2003	Haleakala	NEAT	·	2.8 km	MPC · JPL
95915	2003 HM_{46}	—	April 28, 2003	Socorro	LINEAR	·	1.4 km	MPC · JPL
95916	2003 HU_{47}	—	April 30, 2003	Socorro	LINEAR	V	1.4 km	MPC · JPL
95917	2003 HM_{48}	—	April 30, 2003	Socorro	LINEAR	MAR	2.8 km	MPC · JPL
95918	2003 HQ_{48}	—	April 30, 2003	Socorro	LINEAR	·	2.2 km	MPC · JPL
95919	2003 HC_{51}	—	April 28, 2003	Socorro	LINEAR	RAF	2.0 km	MPC · JPL
95920	2003 HJ_{52}	—	April 30, 2003	Haleakala	NEAT	·	3.6 km	MPC · JPL
95921	2003 HJ_{53}	—	April 30, 2003	Reedy Creek	J. Broughton	V	1.2 km	MPC · JPL
95922	2003 HK_{54}	—	April 24, 2003	Anderson Mesa	LONEOS	·	1.6 km	MPC · JPL
95923	2003 HN_{55}	—	April 27, 2003	Anderson Mesa	LONEOS	·	3.6 km	MPC · JPL
95924	2003 JT_{3}	—	May 2, 2003	Socorro	LINEAR	·	2.2 km	MPC · JPL
95925	2003 JF_{7}	—	May 1, 2003	Socorro	LINEAR	·	2.1 km	MPC · JPL
95926	2003 JC_{9}	—	May 2, 2003	Kitt Peak	Spacewatch	V	1.4 km	MPC · JPL
95927	2003 JP_{9}	—	May 3, 2003	Kitt Peak	Spacewatch	·	3.6 km	MPC · JPL
95928 Tonycook	2003 JO_{13}	Tonycook	May 7, 2003	Catalina	CSS	EUN	3.8 km	MPC · JPL
95929	2003 JG_{14}	—	May 8, 2003	Haleakala	NEAT	ADE	5.7 km	MPC · JPL
95930	2003 JC_{16}	—	May 8, 2003	Haleakala	NEAT	·	5.5 km	MPC · JPL
95931	2003 JT_{16}	—	May 11, 2003	Anderson Mesa	LONEOS	EUP	8.6 km	MPC · JPL
95932	2003 JE_{17}	—	May 8, 2003	Socorro	LINEAR	·	4.2 km	MPC · JPL
95933	2003 KF	—	May 20, 2003	Anderson Mesa	LONEOS	·	4.0 km	MPC · JPL
95934	2003 KM_{2}	—	May 22, 2003	Kitt Peak	Spacewatch	·	4.0 km	MPC · JPL
95935 Grego	2003 KU_{8}	Grego	May 25, 2003	Catalina	CSS	V	1.3 km	MPC · JPL
95936	2003 KG_{17}	—	May 26, 2003	Haleakala	NEAT	·	4.5 km	MPC · JPL
95937	2003 KY_{18}	—	May 28, 2003	Needville	J. Dellinger	·	5.0 km	MPC · JPL
95938	2003 KJ_{20}	—	May 31, 2003	Socorro	LINEAR	·	4.5 km	MPC · JPL
95939 Thagnesland	2003 KL_{20}	Thagnesland	May 30, 2003	Wrightwood	J. W. Young	·	2.1 km	MPC · JPL
95940	2003 LT_{2}	—	June 1, 2003	Reedy Creek	J. Broughton	·	3.8 km	MPC · JPL
95941	2003 LX_{3}	—	June 5, 2003	Reedy Creek	J. Broughton	·	3.4 km	MPC · JPL
95942	2003 LU_{5}	—	June 4, 2003	Reedy Creek	J. Broughton	·	6.0 km	MPC · JPL
95943	2003 LY_{6}	—	June 9, 2003	Reedy Creek	J. Broughton	·	6.8 km	MPC · JPL
95944	2003 MN_{2}	—	June 23, 2003	Anderson Mesa	LONEOS	·	10 km	MPC · JPL
95945	2003 MG_{5}	—	June 26, 2003	Socorro	LINEAR	·	7.9 km	MPC · JPL
95946	2003 MP_{7}	—	June 27, 2003	Haleakala	NEAT	EUP	8.3 km	MPC · JPL
95947	2003 NG_{1}	—	July 1, 2003	Haleakala	NEAT	·	7.1 km	MPC · JPL
95948	2003 OS_{7}	—	July 25, 2003	Palomar	NEAT	·	6.9 km	MPC · JPL
95949	2003 OX_{18}	—	July 30, 2003	Palomar	NEAT	·	7.8 km	MPC · JPL
95950	2003 OZ_{18}	—	July 30, 2003	Palomar	NEAT	·	2.9 km	MPC · JPL
95951 Ernestopalomba	2003 QG_{6}	Ernestopalomba	August 18, 2003	Campo Imperatore	F. Bernardi	·	9.9 km	MPC · JPL
95952	2003 QP_{12}	—	August 22, 2003	Haleakala	NEAT	T_{j} (2.97) · 3:2	15 km	MPC · JPL
95953	2003 QV_{19}	—	August 22, 2003	Palomar	NEAT	·	9.1 km	MPC · JPL
95954 Bayzoltán	2003 QQ_{29}	Bayzoltán	August 23, 2003	Piszkéstető	K. Sárneczky, B. Sipőcz	·	5.6 km	MPC · JPL
95955 Claragianni	2003 QX_{32}	Claragianni	August 21, 2003	Campo Imperatore	Palomba, E.	·	8.1 km	MPC · JPL
95956	2003 RG_{12}	—	September 13, 2003	Haleakala	NEAT	EUP	8.2 km	MPC · JPL
95957	2003 SU_{101}	—	September 20, 2003	Haleakala	NEAT	T_{j} (2.98) · 3:2	13 km	MPC · JPL
95958	2003 SW_{167}	—	September 23, 2003	Haleakala	NEAT	EOS	3.9 km	MPC · JPL
95959 Covadonga	2003 SU_{224}	Covadonga	September 28, 2003	La Cañada	Lacruz, J.	·	4.2 km	MPC · JPL
95960	2003 SX_{282}	—	September 20, 2003	Socorro	LINEAR	·	7.1 km	MPC · JPL
95961	2003 UF_{185}	—	October 21, 2003	Kitt Peak	Spacewatch	·	3.5 km	MPC · JPL
95962 Copito	2003 WZ_{87}	Copito	November 19, 2003	Begues	Manteca, J.	·	6.7 km	MPC · JPL
95963	2004 KE_{4}	—	May 16, 2004	Socorro	LINEAR	·	6.8 km	MPC · JPL
95964	2004 KL_{6}	—	May 17, 2004	Socorro	LINEAR	·	3.0 km	MPC · JPL
95965	2004 KP_{16}	—	May 27, 2004	Kitt Peak	Spacewatch	NYS	2.4 km	MPC · JPL
95966	2004 KW_{16}	—	May 27, 2004	Kitt Peak	Spacewatch	·	4.1 km	MPC · JPL
95967	2004 LZ_{3}	—	June 10, 2004	Socorro	LINEAR	T_{j} (2.99)	7.6 km	MPC · JPL
95968	2004 LR_{8}	—	June 12, 2004	Socorro	LINEAR	EUN	2.5 km	MPC · JPL
95969	2004 LS_{8}	—	June 12, 2004	Socorro	LINEAR	·	2.3 km	MPC · JPL
95970	2004 LT_{8}	—	June 12, 2004	Socorro	LINEAR	·	2.5 km	MPC · JPL
95971	2004 LU_{8}	—	June 12, 2004	Socorro	LINEAR	·	3.1 km	MPC · JPL
95972	2004 LX_{8}	—	June 12, 2004	Palomar	NEAT	DOR	5.3 km	MPC · JPL
95973	2004 LQ_{16}	—	June 13, 2004	Socorro	LINEAR	·	2.5 km	MPC · JPL
95974	2004 LU_{17}	—	June 14, 2004	Socorro	LINEAR	EUN	2.6 km	MPC · JPL
95975	2004 LX_{17}	—	June 14, 2004	Socorro	LINEAR	·	5.6 km	MPC · JPL
95976	2004 LY_{17}	—	June 14, 2004	Socorro	LINEAR	·	2.9 km	MPC · JPL
95977	2004 LY_{21}	—	June 12, 2004	Anderson Mesa	LONEOS	·	1.6 km	MPC · JPL
95978	2004 LT_{22}	—	June 14, 2004	Socorro	LINEAR	·	5.0 km	MPC · JPL
95979	2004 LZ_{25}	—	June 15, 2004	Socorro	LINEAR	·	1.5 km	MPC · JPL
95980 Haroldhill	2004 LE_{30}	Haroldhill	June 14, 2004	Catalina	CSS	·	2.8 km	MPC · JPL
95981	2004 LK_{30}	—	June 13, 2004	Socorro	LINEAR	·	4.4 km	MPC · JPL
95982 Beish	2004 MH_{6}	Beish	June 19, 2004	Catalina	CSS	·	4.4 km	MPC · JPL
95983	2004 MB_{7}	—	June 22, 2004	Kitt Peak	Spacewatch	·	4.4 km	MPC · JPL
95984	2004 NT_{1}	—	July 9, 2004	Socorro	LINEAR	·	6.8 km	MPC · JPL
95985	2004 NV_{1}	—	July 9, 2004	Socorro	LINEAR	·	2.1 km	MPC · JPL
95986	2004 NU_{2}	—	July 10, 2004	Palomar	NEAT	·	3.5 km	MPC · JPL
95987	2004 NH_{3}	—	July 11, 2004	Socorro	LINEAR	·	2.2 km	MPC · JPL
95988	2004 NJ_{4}	—	July 14, 2004	Socorro	LINEAR	PHO	2.8 km	MPC · JPL
95989	2004 NT_{4}	—	July 9, 2004	Palomar	NEAT	·	2.7 km	MPC · JPL
95990	2004 NC_{7}	—	July 11, 2004	Socorro	LINEAR	·	6.8 km	MPC · JPL
95991	2004 ND_{7}	—	July 11, 2004	Socorro	LINEAR	·	3.8 km	MPC · JPL
95992	2004 NF_{8}	—	July 11, 2004	Socorro	LINEAR	EUN	1.5 km	MPC · JPL
95993	2004 NG_{10}	—	July 9, 2004	Socorro	LINEAR	·	4.4 km	MPC · JPL
95994	2004 NB_{11}	—	July 10, 2004	Catalina	CSS	·	4.8 km	MPC · JPL
95995	2004 NC_{11}	—	July 10, 2004	Catalina	CSS	CYB	6.1 km	MPC · JPL
95996	2004 NR_{12}	—	July 11, 2004	Socorro	LINEAR	NYS	2.5 km	MPC · JPL
95997	2004 NZ_{16}	—	July 11, 2004	Socorro	LINEAR	URS	7.0 km	MPC · JPL
95998	2004 NP_{17}	—	July 11, 2004	Socorro	LINEAR	·	4.4 km	MPC · JPL
95999	2004 NX_{21}	—	July 15, 2004	Socorro	LINEAR	PHO	2.3 km	MPC · JPL
96000	2004 NU_{22}	—	July 11, 2004	Socorro	LINEAR	·	1.4 km	MPC · JPL

back to top

== See also ==
- Meanings of minor-planet names: 95001–96000
