= Meanings of minor-planet names: 96001–97000 =

As minor planet discoveries are confirmed, they are given a permanent number by the IAU's Minor Planet Center (MPC), and the discoverers can then submit names for them, following the IAU's naming conventions. The list below concerns those minor planets in the specified number-range that have received names, and explains the meanings of those names.

Official naming citations of newly named small Solar System bodies are approved and published in a bulletin by IAU's Working Group for Small Bodies Nomenclature (WGSBN). Before May 2021, citations were published in MPC's Minor Planet Circulars for many decades. Recent citations can also be found on the JPL Small-Body Database (SBDB). Until his death in 2016, German astronomer Lutz D. Schmadel compiled these citations into the Dictionary of Minor Planet Names (DMP) and regularly updated the collection.

Based on Paul Herget's The Names of the Minor Planets, Schmadel also researched the unclear origin of numerous asteroids, most of which had been named prior to World War II. This article incorporates text from this source, which is in the public domain: SBDB New namings may only be added to this list below after official publication as the preannouncement of names is condemned. The WGSBN publishes a comprehensive guideline for the naming rules of non-cometary small Solar System bodies.

== 96001–96100 ==
| Named minor planet | Provisional | This minor planet was named for... | Ref · Catalog |
|---|---|---|---|
| 96086 Toscanos | 1006 T-2 | Toscanos, Spain, where the ruins of a Phoenician colony are found | JPL · 96086 |

== 96101–96200 ==
back to top

| Named minor planet | Provisional | This minor planet was named for... | Ref · Catalog |
|---|---|---|---|
| 96178 Rochambeau | 1987 SA_{4} | Jean-Baptiste Donatien de Vimeur, comte de Rochambeau (1725–1807), a commander of the French Expeditionary Force supporting the American revolution. French and American troops marched from Newport, Rhode Island to Yorktown, Virginia for the decisive battle, a route now designated as a National Historic Trail. | JPL · 96178 |
| 96189 Pygmalion | 1991 NT_{3} | Pygmalion, god of ancient Greek mythology and name of the Greek sculptor who fell in love with his statue, Galatea. The mythical character of Pygmalion has inspired many musicians and writers, notably George Bernard Shaw, and "pygmalionism" is a well-known psychological concept. | JPL · 96189 |
| 96192 Calgary | 1991 TZ_{15} | Calgary, is the largest city in the province of Alberta, Canada. It was founded in 1875 as a post of the North West Mounted Police and was incorporated as a city in 1894. Calgary's rapid economic growth is due largely to the petroleum industry, agriculture and tourism. | JPL · 96192 |
| 96193 Edmonton | 1991 TG_{16} | Edmonton is the capital city of the province of Alberta, Canada. It was founded in 1795 as a trading post and celebrated the centennial of its incorporation as a city in 2004. Edmonton is well known as a cultural, government and educational center. | JPL · 96193 |
| 96200 Oschin | 1992 QR_{2} | Samuel Oschin (1914–2003), an American entrepreneur and philanthropist. The 48-inch Samuel Oschin telescope at Palomar Observatory in California was used to discover this minor planet. | JPL · 96200 |

== 96201–96300 ==
back to top

| Named minor planet | Provisional | This minor planet was named for... | Ref · Catalog |
|---|---|---|---|
| 96205 Ararat | 1992 ST_{16} | Mount Ararat, an extinct volcano with double cone-shaped peaks (altitudes 5165 and 3925 m), located in the extreme east of Turkey and near the border to Armenia, Azerbaijan and Iran. It has been sung by poets from ancient times to our days. The name was proposed by Freimut Börngen who co-discovered this minor planet. | JPL · 96205 |
| 96206 Eschenberg | 1992 SU_{17} | The Eschenberg Observatory, near Winterthur in Switzerland, was founded in 1979 and attracts 3000 visitors a year. Since 1998 the public observatory has undertaken scientific tasks, especially observations of asteroids. | JPL · 96206 |
| 96217 Gronchi | 1993 RP_{2} | Giovanni-Federico Gronchi (born 1970), an Italian astronomer who carries out research at the University of Pisa on celestial mechanics, secular evolution and proper orbital elements of near-Earth asteroids, the mutual geometry of Keplerian orbit determination and collision singularities. | JPL · 96217 |
| 96254 Hoyo | 1995 DT_{2} | Hōyo Kaikyō (Hōyo Strait), is a 14-kilometer wide strait between Kyushu and Shikoku, two of the four main islands of Japan. The strait is known as a good fishing ground for chub mackerel and horse mackerel. | JPL · 96254 |
| 96257 Roberto | 1995 JE | Roberto Mottola (b. 1990), an Italian-German physicist. | IAU · 96257 |
| 96263 Lorettacavicchi | 1995 SE_{2} | Loretta Cavicchi (born 1954) an Italian painter and sculptor who studied at the Academy of Fine Arts (Italian: Accademia di Belle Arti di Bologna) in Italy (Src). | IAU · 96263 |
| 96268 Tomcarr | 1995 SA_{55} | Thomas D. Carr (1917–2011), an American astronomer and contributor to the U.S. efforts in applied science during World War II and a creator of the astronomy program at the University of Florida, is here honored especially for his pioneering work on the radio properties of Jupiter (Src). | JPL · 96268 |
| 96296 Nanhangda | 1996 OK_{1} | Established in 1952, the Nanjing University of Aeronautics and Astronautics, known by the abbreviation Nanhangda, is a high-level multidisciplinary research university. | IAU · 96296 |

== 96301–96400 ==
back to top

| Named minor planet | Provisional | This minor planet was named for... | Ref · Catalog |
|---|---|---|---|
| 96327 Ullmann | 1997 EJ_{50} | Liv Ullmann (born 1938), a Norwegian screen actress and movie director who made the groundbreaking picture Persona with Ingmar Bergman. Ullmann will be also remembered for her performance in Höstsonaten (Autumn Sonata, 1978), a film which won the 1979 Golden Globe for Best Foreign Language Film. | JPL · 96327 |
| 96344 Scottweaver | 1997 RH_{3} | J. Scott Weaver (1940–2009), was an American professor of geology at Alfred University in New York, where he taught geology, physics and astronomy. He was instrumental in starting the asteroid observation program in 1997 after the 32-inch telescope was computerized. Weaver is a discoverer of minor planets, credited with the co-discovery of the asteroids 31113 Stull and 152641 Fredreed. | JPL · 96344 |
| 96348 Toshiyukimariko | 1997 TU_{26} | Toshiyuki Miho (born 1951) and Mariko Miho (born 1956) work as lecturers in an astronomical class room to show the wonders of the night sky to the public. | JPL · 96348 |

== 96401–96500 ==
back to top

| Named minor planet | Provisional | This minor planet was named for... | Ref · Catalog |
|---|---|---|---|
There are no named minor planets in this number range

== 96501–96600 ==
back to top

| Named minor planet | Provisional | This minor planet was named for... | Ref · Catalog |
|---|---|---|---|
| 96506 Oberösterreich | 1998 OR_{4} | Upper Austria (Oberösterreich) is one of the nine federal states of Austria and one of the most important industrial areas of Austria today. Its capital is Linz, where Johannes Kepler lived from 1612 to 1626 and discovered his third law in 1618. Since 1918 the name Oberösterreich has been official. | JPL · 96506 |
| 96535 Schiehallion | 1998 SC_{5} | Schiehallion, mountain in Perthshire, Scotland | IAU · 96535 |
| 96591 Emiliemartin | 1998 XY | Emilie Martin (b. 1977), a French science journalist. | IAU · 96591 |

== 96601–96700 ==
back to top

| Named minor planet | Provisional | This minor planet was named for... | Ref · Catalog |
|---|---|---|---|
| 96612 Litipei | 1999 CZ_{3} | Li Tipei (born 1939) is a leading astrophysicist and an Academician of the Chinese Academy of Sciences. He has made significant contributions to the study of highenergy astrophysics, and led Insight-HXMT (Hard X-ray Modulation Telescope), China's first X-ray astronomical satellite. | JPL · 96612 |
| 96623 Leani | 1999 ET_{4} | Achille Leani (1924–2004) was an Italian astronomer and one of the founders of the International Union of Amateur Astronomers. Formerly a teacher, he was also a council member of the Società Astronomica Italiana. He founded the Cremona and Soresina observatories, as well as the Gruppo Astrofili Cremonesi. | JPL · 96623 |

== 96701–96800 ==
back to top

| Named minor planet | Provisional | This minor planet was named for... | Ref · Catalog |
|---|---|---|---|
| 96747 Crespodasilva | 1999 QQ_{2} | Lucy D. Crespo da Silva (1978–2000), Brazilian-American astronomer and the object's discoverer, who died in 2000 at age 22. She was a promising student in planetary sciences at the Massachusetts Institute of Technology. As an observer of light curves of minor planets, she contributed data toward the discovery of spin-vector alignment in the Koronis family. The name was suggested by Richard P. Binzel. This is one of the very rare cases where a minor planet is named after its own discoverer (Src). | JPL · 96747 |
| 96765 Poznańuni | 1999 RS_{34} | The Adam Mickiewicz University in Poznań (UAM), Poland, named for the 100-year anniversary of its founding. It is now one of the three top universities in Poland, with about 40 thousand students each year. The teaching and research at UAM includes astronomy, with a strong emphasis on asteroid studies. | IAU · 96765; IAU |

== 96801–96900 ==
back to top

| Named minor planet | Provisional | This minor planet was named for... | Ref · Catalog |
|---|---|---|---|
| 96876 Andreamanna | 1999 TY_{10} | Andrea Manna (born 1964) is a Swiss journalist. He is also a guitar player and amateur astronomer. He observes variable stars and occultations by minor planets from his home town of Cugnasco. He also collaborates with the Specola Solare in Locarno. | JPL · 96876 |

== 96901–97000 ==
back to top

| Named minor planet | Provisional | This minor planet was named for... | Ref · Catalog |
|---|---|---|---|
There are no named minor planets in this number range

back to top

| Preceded by 95,001–96,000 | Meanings of minor-planet names List of minor planets: 96,001–97,000 | Succeeded by 97,001–98,000 |
