= Francis Muir =

Francis Muir (born April 27, 1926) is a former research associate at the Geophysics Department of Stanford University. Muir graduated from Oxford University in 1950 with an MA degree in mathematics.

He worked as a research and field exploration seismologist with Seismograph Service from 1954 through 1962, and then with West Australian Petroleum as a field supervisor until 1967. He then transferred to the Chevron Oilfield Research Company, which he left in 1983 as senior research associate. Since then he has held an appointment as consulting professor in the Geophysics Department at Stanford University, first with Jon Claerbout's SEP group and more recently with Amos Nur's SRB Project.

Muir consults with industry, particularly on applications of velocity anisotropy to oilfield development, and is a co-investigator on a project on Anisotropy for the DOE. He is a member of the SEG Research Committee, an erstwhile fellow of the Royal Astronomical Society, and an active participant in the Web-based "anisotropists" list. The asteroid 95802 Francismuir commemorates Muir in his capacities as the mentor and advisor of its discoverer. He retired from Stanford in 2005.

== Publications ==
- Claerbout, J. F.; and Muir, F.; 1973 "Robust modeling with erratic data", Geophysics, 38, 826–844.
- Dellinger, J.; and Muir, F.; 1988, Imaging reflections in elliptically anisotropic media (Short Note), Geophysics, Vol 53.12, 1616–1618.
- Schoenberg, M.; and Muir, F.; 1989, A calculus for finely layered anisotropic media, Geophysics, 54.5, 581–589.
- Michelena, R. J.; Muir, F.; and Harris, J.; 1993, "Anisotropic travel time tomography", Geophysical Prospecting, 41.4.
- Schoenberg, M.; Muir, F.; and Sayers, C.; 1996, "Introducing ANNIE: A simple three-parameter anisotropic velocity model for shales", J. Seis. Expl. vol. 5, 35–49.
