= 95179 Berkó =

Main-belt asteroid

Discovery
- Discovered by: K. Sárneczky; Z. Heiner
- Discovery site: Piszkéstető Stn.
- Discovery date: 16 January 2002

Designations
- Named after: Ernő Berkó (Hungarian amateur astronomer)
- Alternative designations: 2002 BO
- Minor planet category: main-belt · (inner); Massalia

Orbital characteristics
- Epoch 23 March 2018 (JD 2458200.5)
- Uncertainty parameter 0
- Observation arc: 16.65 yr (6,080 d)
- Aphelion: 2.8679 AU
- Perihelion: 1.9251 AU
- Semi-major axis: 2.3965 AU
- Eccentricity: 0.1967
- Orbital period (sidereal): 3.71 yr (1,355 d)
- Mean anomaly: 242.64°
- Mean motion: 0° 15^{m} 56.52^{s} / day
- Inclination: 1.7898°
- Longitude of ascending node: 155.37°
- Argument of perihelion: 200.28°

Physical characteristics
- Mean diameter: 1.4 km (est. at 0.21)
- Spectral type: S (est. Massalia family)
- Absolute magnitude (H): 16.5; 16.6

95179 Berkó (provisional designation 2002 BO) is a Massalian asteroid from the inner regions of the asteroid belt, approximately 1.4 kilometers (0.9 miles) in diameter.

The likely S-type asteroid was discovered on 16 January 2002, by Hungarian astronomers Krisztián Sárneczky and Zsuzsanna Heiner at the Konkoly Observatory's Piszkéstető Station northeast of Budapest, Hungary, and later named after Hungarian amateur astronomer Ernő Berkó.

== Orbit and classification ==
Berkó is an attributed member of the Massalia family (FIN: 404), a large family of more than 6000 known asteroids, named after 20 Massalia, the family's parent body.

The asteroid orbits the Sun in the inner main belt at a distance of 1.9–2.9 AU once every 3 years and 9 months (1,355 days; semi-major axis of 2.4 AU). Its orbit has an eccentricity of 0.20 and an inclination of 2° with respect to the ecliptic. The first observation was made at Lincoln Laboratory's Experimental Test Site in August 2000, extending the body's observation arc by 17 months prior to its official discovery observation at Piszkéstető.

== Physical characteristics ==
Berkó has an absolute magnitude of 16.5. While its spectral type has not been determined, it is likely an S-type asteroid due to its membership to the Massalia family. As of 2018, its effective size, composition and albedo, as well as its rotation period, poles and shape remain unknown.

Based on an assumed albedo of 0.21 – derived from 20 Massalia, the Massalia family's parent body, Berkó measures 1.4 kilometers in diameter using an absolute magnitude of 16.5.

== Naming ==
This minor planet is named after Ernő Berkó (born 1955), a Hungarian amateur astronomer and independent discoverer of the supernova 1999by, as well as an observer of deep-sky objects and double stars. As of 2006, he has contributed to the WDS catalog with the discovery of more than 160 double stars. The official naming citation was published by the Minor Planet Center on 6 January 2007 (M.P.C. 58597).
