= Cagliari (disambiguation) =

Cagliari is a city in Sardinia, Italy.

Cagliari may also refer to:

- Province of Cagliari
  - Cagliari Elmas Airport
  - Cagliari Calcio, a football club
  - Roman Catholic Archdiocese of Cagliari
  - Cagliari Observatory
  - 59th Infantry Division "Cagliari", an Italian division of World War II
- Paolo Veronese (1528–1588), Italian painter of the Renaissance, also known as Paolo Cagliari

== See also ==
- Caligari (disambiguation)
- Calgary (disambiguation)
