= Calgary (disambiguation) =

Calgary is a city in Alberta, Canada.

Calgary may also refer to:

== Other places ==
- Calgary, Mull, a village and bay in Scotland
  - Calgary Castle, a mansion
- Calgary Metropolitan Region, the city's wider urban conurbation
  - Fort Calgary, a historic police fort
- 96192 Calgary, a main-belt asteroid

Defunct Canadian administrative areas:

- Calgary (federal electoral district), Alberta
- Calgary (provincial electoral district), Alberta
- Calgary (territorial electoral district), Northwest Territories

== Other uses ==
- HMCS Calgary, two Canadian warships
- Calgary corpus, for testing data compression algorithms
- "Calgary", a song on Bon Iver's 2011 album Bon Iver
- "Calgary", a song on Tate McRae's 2023 album Think Later

== See also ==
- South Calgary (disambiguation)
