= Caligaris =

Caligaris is a surname. Notable people with the surname include:

- Dave Caligaris (born 1956), Greek American basketball player
- Umberto Caligaris (1901–1940), Italian footballer and manager

== See also ==
- Caligari (disambiguation)
