= Caligari =

Caligari may refer to:

- Dr. Caligari, a major character in the 1920 film The Cabinet of Dr. Caligari
- Caligari Corporation, an American software company acquired by Microsoft
- John Caligari (born 1960), a lieutenant general in the Australian Army
- Caligari Carnival, the setting of the ninth book of A Series of Unfortunate Events
- Cali Gari, a Japanese rock band

== See also ==
- Calegari
- Cagliari
- Caligaris, a surname
