= List of minor planets: 96001–97000 =

The following is a partial list of minor planets, running from minor-planet number 96001 through 97000, inclusive. The primary data for this and other partial lists is based on JPL's "Small-Body Orbital Elements" and data available from the Minor Planet Center. Critical list information is also provided by the MPC, unless otherwise specified from Lowell Observatory. A detailed description of the table's columns and additional sources are given on the main page including a complete list of every page in this series, and a statistical break-up on the dynamical classification of minor planets.

Also see the summary list of all named bodies in numerical and alphabetical order, and the corresponding naming citations for the number range of this particular list. New namings may only be added to this list after official publication, as the preannouncement of names is condemned by the Working Group for Small Bodies Nomenclature of the International Astronomical Union.

| Near-Earth obj. | MBA (inner) | MBA (outer) | Centaur |
| Mars-crosser | MBA (middle) | Jupiter trojan | Trans-Neptunian obj. |
| Unclassified |

== 96001–96100 ==
| Designation | | | Discovery | | | Properties | | Ref |
| Permanent | Provisional | Named after | Date | Site | Discoverer(s) | Category | Diam. | Ref |
|---|---|---|---|---|---|---|---|---|
| 96001 | 2004 NY_{22} | — | July 11, 2004 | Socorro | LINEAR | · | 1.9 km | MPC · JPL |
| 96002 | 2004 ND_{23} | — | July 11, 2004 | Palomar | NEAT | · | 1.5 km | MPC · JPL |
| 96003 | 2004 NT_{24} | — | July 15, 2004 | Socorro | LINEAR | · | 1.3 km | MPC · JPL |
| 96004 | 2004 NH_{25} | — | July 15, 2004 | Socorro | LINEAR | · | 4.5 km | MPC · JPL |
| 96005 | 2004 NZ_{26} | — | July 11, 2004 | Socorro | LINEAR | V | 1.4 km | MPC · JPL |
| 96006 | 2004 NE_{27} | — | July 11, 2004 | Socorro | LINEAR | · | 910 m | MPC · JPL |
| 96007 | 2004 ON_{3} | — | July 16, 2004 | Socorro | LINEAR | NYS | 2.6 km | MPC · JPL |
| 96008 | 2004 OA_{5} | — | July 16, 2004 | Socorro | LINEAR | · | 3.0 km | MPC · JPL |
| 96009 | 2004 OB_{6} | — | July 18, 2004 | Reedy Creek | J. Broughton | · | 3.0 km | MPC · JPL |
| 96010 | 2004 PY_{2} | — | August 3, 2004 | Siding Spring | SSS | PHO | 3.5 km | MPC · JPL |
| 96011 | 2004 PD_{6} | — | August 6, 2004 | Palomar | NEAT | · | 1.8 km | MPC · JPL |
| 96012 | 2004 PP_{6} | — | August 6, 2004 | Palomar | NEAT | · | 1.0 km | MPC · JPL |
| 96013 | 2004 PB_{7} | — | August 6, 2004 | Palomar | NEAT | NYS | 1.9 km | MPC · JPL |
| 96014 | 2004 PD_{7} | — | August 6, 2004 | Palomar | NEAT | NYS | 2.1 km | MPC · JPL |
| 96015 | 2004 PO_{7} | — | August 6, 2004 | Palomar | NEAT | · | 2.6 km | MPC · JPL |
| 96016 | 2004 PP_{7} | — | August 6, 2004 | Palomar | NEAT | NYS | 1.9 km | MPC · JPL |
| 96017 | 2004 PA_{9} | — | August 6, 2004 | Palomar | NEAT | V | 1.1 km | MPC · JPL |
| 96018 | 2004 PG_{9} | — | August 6, 2004 | Palomar | NEAT | · | 1.9 km | MPC · JPL |
| 96019 | 2004 PK_{9} | — | August 6, 2004 | Palomar | NEAT | · | 4.9 km | MPC · JPL |
| 96020 | 2004 PL_{9} | — | August 6, 2004 | Palomar | NEAT | · | 4.1 km | MPC · JPL |
| 96021 | 2004 PD_{12} | — | August 7, 2004 | Palomar | NEAT | · | 3.0 km | MPC · JPL |
| 96022 | 2004 PZ_{13} | — | August 7, 2004 | Palomar | NEAT | · | 2.0 km | MPC · JPL |
| 96023 | 2004 PW_{17} | — | August 8, 2004 | Socorro | LINEAR | · | 1.6 km | MPC · JPL |
| 96024 | 2004 PD_{19} | — | August 8, 2004 | Anderson Mesa | LONEOS | · | 2.3 km | MPC · JPL |
| 96025 | 2004 PN_{19} | — | August 8, 2004 | Anderson Mesa | LONEOS | · | 2.3 km | MPC · JPL |
| 96026 | 2004 PO_{27} | — | August 9, 2004 | Reedy Creek | J. Broughton | · | 3.0 km | MPC · JPL |
| 96027 | 2004 PB_{29} | — | August 6, 2004 | Palomar | NEAT | NYS | 1.4 km | MPC · JPL |
| 96028 | 2004 PD_{30} | — | August 8, 2004 | Campo Imperatore | CINEOS | VER | 5.6 km | MPC · JPL |
| 96029 | 2004 PK_{31} | — | August 8, 2004 | Socorro | LINEAR | · | 3.8 km | MPC · JPL |
| 96030 | 2004 PZ_{31} | — | August 8, 2004 | Socorro | LINEAR | V | 1.3 km | MPC · JPL |
| 96031 | 2004 PG_{33} | — | August 8, 2004 | Socorro | LINEAR | PAD | 2.4 km | MPC · JPL |
| 96032 | 2004 PN_{35} | — | August 8, 2004 | Anderson Mesa | LONEOS | · | 2.8 km | MPC · JPL |
| 96033 | 2004 PE_{36} | — | August 9, 2004 | Campo Imperatore | CINEOS | · | 1.8 km | MPC · JPL |
| 96034 | 2004 PW_{42} | — | August 10, 2004 | Reedy Creek | J. Broughton | · | 3.2 km | MPC · JPL |
| 96035 | 2004 PB_{54} | — | August 8, 2004 | Anderson Mesa | LONEOS | NYS | 2.3 km | MPC · JPL |
| 96036 | 2004 PP_{57} | — | August 9, 2004 | Socorro | LINEAR | · | 3.2 km | MPC · JPL |
| 96037 | 2004 PQ_{65} | — | August 10, 2004 | Anderson Mesa | LONEOS | · | 2.4 km | MPC · JPL |
| 96038 | 2004 PY_{67} | — | August 6, 2004 | Palomar | NEAT | · | 3.7 km | MPC · JPL |
| 96039 | 2004 PN_{79} | — | August 9, 2004 | Socorro | LINEAR | · | 2.4 km | MPC · JPL |
| 96040 | 2004 PO_{82} | — | August 10, 2004 | Socorro | LINEAR | · | 3.0 km | MPC · JPL |
| 96041 | 2004 PR_{90} | — | August 10, 2004 | Socorro | LINEAR | · | 1.7 km | MPC · JPL |
| 96042 | 2004 PZ_{90} | — | August 10, 2004 | Socorro | LINEAR | · | 3.4 km | MPC · JPL |
| 96043 | 2004 PC_{93} | — | August 12, 2004 | Reedy Creek | J. Broughton | · | 3.3 km | MPC · JPL |
| 96044 | 2004 PU_{95} | — | August 13, 2004 | Reedy Creek | J. Broughton | EOS | 3.5 km | MPC · JPL |
| 96045 | 2004 PX_{97} | — | August 14, 2004 | Reedy Creek | J. Broughton | EOS | 5.4 km | MPC · JPL |
| 96046 | 2004 PW_{99} | — | August 11, 2004 | Socorro | LINEAR | EUN | 1.6 km | MPC · JPL |
| 96047 | 2004 QW_{6} | — | August 21, 2004 | Reedy Creek | J. Broughton | · | 5.3 km | MPC · JPL |
| 96048 | 2004 QU_{9} | — | August 21, 2004 | Siding Spring | SSS | · | 1.4 km | MPC · JPL |
| 96049 | 2004 QF_{11} | — | August 21, 2004 | Siding Spring | SSS | EOS | 4.1 km | MPC · JPL |
| 96050 | 2004 QM_{14} | — | August 21, 2004 | Catalina | CSS | · | 3.6 km | MPC · JPL |
| 96051 | 2115 P-L | — | September 24, 1960 | Palomar | C. J. van Houten, I. van Houten-Groeneveld, T. Gehrels | · | 4.9 km | MPC · JPL |
| 96052 | 2134 P-L | — | September 24, 1960 | Palomar | C. J. van Houten, I. van Houten-Groeneveld, T. Gehrels | · | 2.1 km | MPC · JPL |
| 96053 | 2156 P-L | — | September 24, 1960 | Palomar | C. J. van Houten, I. van Houten-Groeneveld, T. Gehrels | · | 5.6 km | MPC · JPL |
| 96054 | 2189 P-L | — | September 24, 1960 | Palomar | C. J. van Houten, I. van Houten-Groeneveld, T. Gehrels | · | 7.9 km | MPC · JPL |
| 96055 | 2596 P-L | — | September 24, 1960 | Palomar | C. J. van Houten, I. van Houten-Groeneveld, T. Gehrels | · | 6.0 km | MPC · JPL |
| 96056 | 2704 P-L | — | September 24, 1960 | Palomar | C. J. van Houten, I. van Houten-Groeneveld, T. Gehrels | · | 3.3 km | MPC · JPL |
| 96057 | 2711 P-L | — | September 24, 1960 | Palomar | C. J. van Houten, I. van Houten-Groeneveld, T. Gehrels | NYS · | 3.2 km | MPC · JPL |
| 96058 | 2831 P-L | — | September 24, 1960 | Palomar | C. J. van Houten, I. van Houten-Groeneveld, T. Gehrels | · | 5.1 km | MPC · JPL |
| 96059 | 3030 P-L | — | September 24, 1960 | Palomar | C. J. van Houten, I. van Houten-Groeneveld, T. Gehrels | · | 7.0 km | MPC · JPL |
| 96060 | 3103 P-L | — | September 24, 1960 | Palomar | C. J. van Houten, I. van Houten-Groeneveld, T. Gehrels | (31811) | 5.8 km | MPC · JPL |
| 96061 | 4222 P-L | — | September 24, 1960 | Palomar | C. J. van Houten, I. van Houten-Groeneveld, T. Gehrels | · | 3.3 km | MPC · JPL |
| 96062 | 4558 P-L | — | September 24, 1960 | Palomar | C. J. van Houten, I. van Houten-Groeneveld, T. Gehrels | · | 6.0 km | MPC · JPL |
| 96063 | 4627 P-L | — | September 24, 1960 | Palomar | C. J. van Houten, I. van Houten-Groeneveld, T. Gehrels | MAS | 1.2 km | MPC · JPL |
| 96064 | 4772 P-L | — | September 24, 1960 | Palomar | C. J. van Houten, I. van Houten-Groeneveld, T. Gehrels | · | 2.3 km | MPC · JPL |
| 96065 | 4785 P-L | — | September 24, 1960 | Palomar | C. J. van Houten, I. van Houten-Groeneveld, T. Gehrels | THM | 3.2 km | MPC · JPL |
| 96066 | 4799 P-L | — | September 24, 1960 | Palomar | C. J. van Houten, I. van Houten-Groeneveld, T. Gehrels | · | 2.1 km | MPC · JPL |
| 96067 | 4810 P-L | — | September 24, 1960 | Palomar | C. J. van Houten, I. van Houten-Groeneveld, T. Gehrels | · | 6.5 km | MPC · JPL |
| 96068 | 4819 P-L | — | September 24, 1960 | Palomar | C. J. van Houten, I. van Houten-Groeneveld, T. Gehrels | CYB | 8.1 km | MPC · JPL |
| 96069 | 6060 P-L | — | September 24, 1960 | Palomar | C. J. van Houten, I. van Houten-Groeneveld, T. Gehrels | · | 2.6 km | MPC · JPL |
| 96070 | 6078 P-L | — | September 24, 1960 | Palomar | C. J. van Houten, I. van Houten-Groeneveld, T. Gehrels | JUN | 3.8 km | MPC · JPL |
| 96071 | 6127 P-L | — | September 25, 1960 | Palomar | C. J. van Houten, I. van Houten-Groeneveld, T. Gehrels | · | 2.7 km | MPC · JPL |
| 96072 | 6222 P-L | — | September 24, 1960 | Palomar | C. J. van Houten, I. van Houten-Groeneveld, T. Gehrels | · | 1.0 km | MPC · JPL |
| 96073 | 6677 P-L | — | September 24, 1960 | Palomar | C. J. van Houten, I. van Houten-Groeneveld, T. Gehrels | · | 1.7 km | MPC · JPL |
| 96074 | 6709 P-L | — | September 24, 1960 | Palomar | C. J. van Houten, I. van Houten-Groeneveld, T. Gehrels | NYS | 1.8 km | MPC · JPL |
| 96075 | 6736 P-L | — | September 24, 1960 | Palomar | C. J. van Houten, I. van Houten-Groeneveld, T. Gehrels | · | 2.4 km | MPC · JPL |
| 96076 | 6825 P-L | — | September 26, 1960 | Palomar | C. J. van Houten, I. van Houten-Groeneveld, T. Gehrels | · | 1.3 km | MPC · JPL |
| 96077 | 6840 P-L | — | September 24, 1960 | Palomar | C. J. van Houten, I. van Houten-Groeneveld, T. Gehrels | · | 1.7 km | MPC · JPL |
| 96078 | 6857 P-L | — | September 24, 1960 | Palomar | C. J. van Houten, I. van Houten-Groeneveld, T. Gehrels | · | 3.5 km | MPC · JPL |
| 96079 | 7583 P-L | — | October 22, 1960 | Palomar | C. J. van Houten, I. van Houten-Groeneveld, T. Gehrels | · | 1.6 km | MPC · JPL |
| 96080 | 7649 P-L | — | September 27, 1960 | Palomar | C. J. van Houten, I. van Houten-Groeneveld, T. Gehrels | · | 1.2 km | MPC · JPL |
| 96081 | 9079 P-L | — | October 17, 1960 | Palomar | C. J. van Houten, I. van Houten-Groeneveld, T. Gehrels | · | 2.0 km | MPC · JPL |
| 96082 | 9606 P-L | — | September 24, 1960 | Palomar | C. J. van Houten, I. van Houten-Groeneveld, T. Gehrels | THM | 4.7 km | MPC · JPL |
| 96083 | 1242 T-1 | — | March 25, 1971 | Palomar | C. J. van Houten, I. van Houten-Groeneveld, T. Gehrels | · | 1.8 km | MPC · JPL |
| 96084 | 2225 T-1 | — | March 25, 1971 | Palomar | C. J. van Houten, I. van Houten-Groeneveld, T. Gehrels | · | 2.0 km | MPC · JPL |
| 96085 | 2256 T-1 | — | March 25, 1971 | Palomar | C. J. van Houten, I. van Houten-Groeneveld, T. Gehrels | · | 2.1 km | MPC · JPL |
| 96086 Toscanos | 1006 T-2 | Toscanos | September 29, 1973 | Palomar | C. J. van Houten, I. van Houten-Groeneveld, T. Gehrels | 3:2 | 8.7 km | MPC · JPL |
| 96087 | 1035 T-2 | — | September 29, 1973 | Palomar | C. J. van Houten, I. van Houten-Groeneveld, T. Gehrels | PHO | 2.1 km | MPC · JPL |
| 96088 | 1074 T-2 | — | September 29, 1973 | Palomar | C. J. van Houten, I. van Houten-Groeneveld, T. Gehrels | · | 3.5 km | MPC · JPL |
| 96089 | 1127 T-2 | — | September 29, 1973 | Palomar | C. J. van Houten, I. van Houten-Groeneveld, T. Gehrels | · | 3.4 km | MPC · JPL |
| 96090 | 1185 T-2 | — | September 29, 1973 | Palomar | C. J. van Houten, I. van Houten-Groeneveld, T. Gehrels | · | 1.6 km | MPC · JPL |
| 96091 | 1267 T-2 | — | September 30, 1973 | Palomar | C. J. van Houten, I. van Houten-Groeneveld, T. Gehrels | EOS | 3.1 km | MPC · JPL |
| 96092 | 2036 T-2 | — | September 29, 1973 | Palomar | C. J. van Houten, I. van Houten-Groeneveld, T. Gehrels | · | 2.9 km | MPC · JPL |
| 96093 | 2063 T-2 | — | September 29, 1973 | Palomar | C. J. van Houten, I. van Houten-Groeneveld, T. Gehrels | · | 3.6 km | MPC · JPL |
| 96094 | 2089 T-2 | — | September 29, 1973 | Palomar | C. J. van Houten, I. van Houten-Groeneveld, T. Gehrels | · | 1.4 km | MPC · JPL |
| 96095 | 2095 T-2 | — | September 29, 1973 | Palomar | C. J. van Houten, I. van Houten-Groeneveld, T. Gehrels | · | 2.8 km | MPC · JPL |
| 96096 | 2111 T-2 | — | September 29, 1973 | Palomar | C. J. van Houten, I. van Houten-Groeneveld, T. Gehrels | · | 1.4 km | MPC · JPL |
| 96097 | 2122 T-2 | — | September 29, 1973 | Palomar | C. J. van Houten, I. van Houten-Groeneveld, T. Gehrels | · | 1.2 km | MPC · JPL |
| 96098 | 2143 T-2 | — | September 29, 1973 | Palomar | C. J. van Houten, I. van Houten-Groeneveld, T. Gehrels | · | 4.2 km | MPC · JPL |
| 96099 | 2193 T-2 | — | September 29, 1973 | Palomar | C. J. van Houten, I. van Houten-Groeneveld, T. Gehrels | · | 2.9 km | MPC · JPL |
| 96100 | 2263 T-2 | — | September 29, 1973 | Palomar | C. J. van Houten, I. van Houten-Groeneveld, T. Gehrels | · | 2.8 km | MPC · JPL |

== 96101–96200 ==
back to top

| Designation | | | Discovery | | | Properties | | Ref |
| Permanent | Provisional | Named after | Date | Site | Discoverer(s) | Category | Diam. | Ref |
|---|---|---|---|---|---|---|---|---|
| 96101 | 3006 T-2 | — | September 30, 1973 | Palomar | C. J. van Houten, I. van Houten-Groeneveld, T. Gehrels | · | 1.9 km | MPC · JPL |
| 96102 | 3054 T-2 | — | September 30, 1973 | Palomar | C. J. van Houten, I. van Houten-Groeneveld, T. Gehrels | · | 1.4 km | MPC · JPL |
| 96103 | 3132 T-2 | — | September 30, 1973 | Palomar | C. J. van Houten, I. van Houten-Groeneveld, T. Gehrels | · | 3.9 km | MPC · JPL |
| 96104 | 3189 T-2 | — | September 30, 1973 | Palomar | C. J. van Houten, I. van Houten-Groeneveld, T. Gehrels | · | 2.2 km | MPC · JPL |
| 96105 | 3225 T-2 | — | September 30, 1973 | Palomar | C. J. van Houten, I. van Houten-Groeneveld, T. Gehrels | · | 1.4 km | MPC · JPL |
| 96106 | 3313 T-2 | — | September 25, 1973 | Palomar | C. J. van Houten, I. van Houten-Groeneveld, T. Gehrels | · | 1.9 km | MPC · JPL |
| 96107 | 4109 T-2 | — | September 29, 1973 | Palomar | C. J. van Houten, I. van Houten-Groeneveld, T. Gehrels | · | 2.2 km | MPC · JPL |
| 96108 | 4167 T-2 | — | September 29, 1973 | Palomar | C. J. van Houten, I. van Houten-Groeneveld, T. Gehrels | · | 4.0 km | MPC · JPL |
| 96109 | 4192 T-2 | — | September 29, 1973 | Palomar | C. J. van Houten, I. van Houten-Groeneveld, T. Gehrels | · | 3.7 km | MPC · JPL |
| 96110 | 4224 T-2 | — | September 29, 1973 | Palomar | C. J. van Houten, I. van Houten-Groeneveld, T. Gehrels | · | 1 km | MPC · JPL |
| 96111 | 4243 T-2 | — | September 29, 1973 | Palomar | C. J. van Houten, I. van Houten-Groeneveld, T. Gehrels | · | 2.5 km | MPC · JPL |
| 96112 | 5063 T-2 | — | September 25, 1973 | Palomar | C. J. van Houten, I. van Houten-Groeneveld, T. Gehrels | · | 2.7 km | MPC · JPL |
| 96113 | 5083 T-2 | — | September 25, 1973 | Palomar | C. J. van Houten, I. van Houten-Groeneveld, T. Gehrels | · | 3.7 km | MPC · JPL |
| 96114 | 5088 T-2 | — | September 25, 1973 | Palomar | C. J. van Houten, I. van Houten-Groeneveld, T. Gehrels | · | 4.3 km | MPC · JPL |
| 96115 | 5139 T-2 | — | September 25, 1973 | Palomar | C. J. van Houten, I. van Houten-Groeneveld, T. Gehrels | EOS | 3.9 km | MPC · JPL |
| 96116 | 5412 T-2 | — | September 30, 1973 | Palomar | C. J. van Houten, I. van Houten-Groeneveld, T. Gehrels | EOS | 3.2 km | MPC · JPL |
| 96117 | 5458 T-2 | — | September 30, 1973 | Palomar | C. J. van Houten, I. van Houten-Groeneveld, T. Gehrels | · | 1.8 km | MPC · JPL |
| 96118 | 1087 T-3 | — | October 17, 1977 | Palomar | C. J. van Houten, I. van Houten-Groeneveld, T. Gehrels | · | 2.5 km | MPC · JPL |
| 96119 | 1091 T-3 | — | October 17, 1977 | Palomar | C. J. van Houten, I. van Houten-Groeneveld, T. Gehrels | EOS | 4.2 km | MPC · JPL |
| 96120 | 1114 T-3 | — | October 17, 1977 | Palomar | C. J. van Houten, I. van Houten-Groeneveld, T. Gehrels | · | 2.2 km | MPC · JPL |
| 96121 | 1127 T-3 | — | October 17, 1977 | Palomar | C. J. van Houten, I. van Houten-Groeneveld, T. Gehrels | · | 4.3 km | MPC · JPL |
| 96122 | 1141 T-3 | — | October 17, 1977 | Palomar | C. J. van Houten, I. van Houten-Groeneveld, T. Gehrels | · | 5.9 km | MPC · JPL |
| 96123 | 1184 T-3 | — | October 17, 1977 | Palomar | C. J. van Houten, I. van Houten-Groeneveld, T. Gehrels | · | 5.5 km | MPC · JPL |
| 96124 | 2058 T-3 | — | October 16, 1977 | Palomar | C. J. van Houten, I. van Houten-Groeneveld, T. Gehrels | · | 8.1 km | MPC · JPL |
| 96125 | 2152 T-3 | — | October 16, 1977 | Palomar | C. J. van Houten, I. van Houten-Groeneveld, T. Gehrels | · | 4.3 km | MPC · JPL |
| 96126 | 2174 T-3 | — | October 16, 1977 | Palomar | C. J. van Houten, I. van Houten-Groeneveld, T. Gehrels | · | 4.0 km | MPC · JPL |
| 96127 | 2202 T-3 | — | October 16, 1977 | Palomar | C. J. van Houten, I. van Houten-Groeneveld, T. Gehrels | EOS | 3.6 km | MPC · JPL |
| 96128 | 2220 T-3 | — | October 17, 1977 | Palomar | C. J. van Houten, I. van Houten-Groeneveld, T. Gehrels | HYG | 4.1 km | MPC · JPL |
| 96129 | 2248 T-3 | — | October 16, 1977 | Palomar | C. J. van Houten, I. van Houten-Groeneveld, T. Gehrels | · | 5.3 km | MPC · JPL |
| 96130 | 2269 T-3 | — | October 16, 1977 | Palomar | C. J. van Houten, I. van Houten-Groeneveld, T. Gehrels | · | 3.7 km | MPC · JPL |
| 96131 | 2276 T-3 | — | October 16, 1977 | Palomar | C. J. van Houten, I. van Houten-Groeneveld, T. Gehrels | · | 6.3 km | MPC · JPL |
| 96132 | 2354 T-3 | — | October 16, 1977 | Palomar | C. J. van Houten, I. van Houten-Groeneveld, T. Gehrels | · | 4.5 km | MPC · JPL |
| 96133 | 2488 T-3 | — | October 16, 1977 | Palomar | C. J. van Houten, I. van Houten-Groeneveld, T. Gehrels | PAD | 4.0 km | MPC · JPL |
| 96134 | 3027 T-3 | — | October 16, 1977 | Palomar | C. J. van Houten, I. van Houten-Groeneveld, T. Gehrels | · | 5.5 km | MPC · JPL |
| 96135 | 3054 T-3 | — | October 16, 1977 | Palomar | C. J. van Houten, I. van Houten-Groeneveld, T. Gehrels | · | 4.5 km | MPC · JPL |
| 96136 | 3209 T-3 | — | October 16, 1977 | Palomar | C. J. van Houten, I. van Houten-Groeneveld, T. Gehrels | · | 6.5 km | MPC · JPL |
| 96137 | 3252 T-3 | — | October 16, 1977 | Palomar | C. J. van Houten, I. van Houten-Groeneveld, T. Gehrels | · | 1.3 km | MPC · JPL |
| 96138 | 3277 T-3 | — | October 16, 1977 | Palomar | C. J. van Houten, I. van Houten-Groeneveld, T. Gehrels | · | 3.0 km | MPC · JPL |
| 96139 | 3324 T-3 | — | October 16, 1977 | Palomar | C. J. van Houten, I. van Houten-Groeneveld, T. Gehrels | · | 4.4 km | MPC · JPL |
| 96140 | 3339 T-3 | — | October 16, 1977 | Palomar | C. J. van Houten, I. van Houten-Groeneveld, T. Gehrels | · | 4.0 km | MPC · JPL |
| 96141 | 3359 T-3 | — | October 16, 1977 | Palomar | C. J. van Houten, I. van Houten-Groeneveld, T. Gehrels | MAS | 1.1 km | MPC · JPL |
| 96142 | 3425 T-3 | — | October 16, 1977 | Palomar | C. J. van Houten, I. van Houten-Groeneveld, T. Gehrels | · | 4.6 km | MPC · JPL |
| 96143 | 3434 T-3 | — | October 16, 1977 | Palomar | C. J. van Houten, I. van Houten-Groeneveld, T. Gehrels | · | 3.0 km | MPC · JPL |
| 96144 | 3466 T-3 | — | October 16, 1977 | Palomar | C. J. van Houten, I. van Houten-Groeneveld, T. Gehrels | slow | 4.6 km | MPC · JPL |
| 96145 | 3808 T-3 | — | October 16, 1977 | Palomar | C. J. van Houten, I. van Houten-Groeneveld, T. Gehrels | · | 7.9 km | MPC · JPL |
| 96146 | 3834 T-3 | — | October 16, 1977 | Palomar | C. J. van Houten, I. van Houten-Groeneveld, T. Gehrels | NYS | 2.6 km | MPC · JPL |
| 96147 | 3851 T-3 | — | October 16, 1977 | Palomar | C. J. van Houten, I. van Houten-Groeneveld, T. Gehrels | · | 4.7 km | MPC · JPL |
| 96148 | 3991 T-3 | — | October 16, 1977 | Palomar | C. J. van Houten, I. van Houten-Groeneveld, T. Gehrels | · | 6.7 km | MPC · JPL |
| 96149 | 4125 T-3 | — | October 16, 1977 | Palomar | C. J. van Houten, I. van Houten-Groeneveld, T. Gehrels | CLO | 5.0 km | MPC · JPL |
| 96150 | 4158 T-3 | — | October 16, 1977 | Palomar | C. J. van Houten, I. van Houten-Groeneveld, T. Gehrels | · | 1.1 km | MPC · JPL |
| 96151 | 4239 T-3 | — | October 16, 1977 | Palomar | C. J. van Houten, I. van Houten-Groeneveld, T. Gehrels | · | 3.9 km | MPC · JPL |
| 96152 | 4358 T-3 | — | October 16, 1977 | Palomar | C. J. van Houten, I. van Houten-Groeneveld, T. Gehrels | EOS | 4.3 km | MPC · JPL |
| 96153 | 4651 T-3 | — | October 16, 1977 | Palomar | C. J. van Houten, I. van Houten-Groeneveld, T. Gehrels | · | 7.2 km | MPC · JPL |
| 96154 | 5121 T-3 | — | October 16, 1977 | Palomar | C. J. van Houten, I. van Houten-Groeneveld, T. Gehrels | EOS | 4.2 km | MPC · JPL |
| 96155 | 1973 HA | — | April 27, 1973 | Palomar | A. R. Sandage | · | 5.3 km | MPC · JPL |
| 96156 | 1974 CB | — | February 14, 1974 | Harvard Observatory | Harvard Observatory | · | 4.3 km | MPC · JPL |
| 96157 | 1978 UV_{4} | — | October 27, 1978 | Palomar | C. M. Olmstead | NYS | 2.4 km | MPC · JPL |
| 96158 | 1978 UE_{8} | — | October 27, 1978 | Palomar | C. M. Olmstead | · | 3.4 km | MPC · JPL |
| 96159 | 1978 VR_{3} | — | November 7, 1978 | Palomar | E. F. Helin, S. J. Bus | NYS | 1.7 km | MPC · JPL |
| 96160 | 1978 VW_{7} | — | November 7, 1978 | Palomar | E. F. Helin, S. J. Bus | · | 2.0 km | MPC · JPL |
| 96161 | 1978 VS_{9} | — | November 7, 1978 | Palomar | E. F. Helin, S. J. Bus | MAS | 1.4 km | MPC · JPL |
| 96162 | 1979 MN_{7} | — | June 25, 1979 | Siding Spring | E. F. Helin, S. J. Bus | · | 3.2 km | MPC · JPL |
| 96163 | 1981 DJ_{1} | — | February 28, 1981 | Siding Spring | S. J. Bus | · | 2.1 km | MPC · JPL |
| 96164 | 1981 EH_{6} | — | March 2, 1981 | Siding Spring | S. J. Bus | · | 3.9 km | MPC · JPL |
| 96165 | 1981 EL_{14} | — | March 1, 1981 | Siding Spring | S. J. Bus | · | 7.0 km | MPC · JPL |
| 96166 | 1981 EW_{15} | — | March 1, 1981 | Siding Spring | S. J. Bus | · | 2.3 km | MPC · JPL |
| 96167 | 1981 EG_{20} | — | March 2, 1981 | Siding Spring | S. J. Bus | · | 6.1 km | MPC · JPL |
| 96168 | 1981 ER_{23} | — | March 3, 1981 | Siding Spring | S. J. Bus | · | 2.0 km | MPC · JPL |
| 96169 | 1981 EW_{23} | — | March 7, 1981 | Siding Spring | S. J. Bus | NYS | 1.4 km | MPC · JPL |
| 96170 | 1981 EE_{29} | — | March 1, 1981 | Siding Spring | S. J. Bus | · | 1.7 km | MPC · JPL |
| 96171 | 1981 ET_{32} | — | March 8, 1981 | Siding Spring | S. J. Bus | EOS | 4.3 km | MPC · JPL |
| 96172 | 1981 EN_{34} | — | March 2, 1981 | Siding Spring | S. J. Bus | V | 1.7 km | MPC · JPL |
| 96173 | 1981 ED_{36} | — | March 6, 1981 | Siding Spring | S. J. Bus | V | 2.3 km | MPC · JPL |
| 96174 | 1981 EF_{38} | — | March 1, 1981 | Siding Spring | S. J. Bus | slow | 1.1 km | MPC · JPL |
| 96175 | 1981 EY_{43} | — | March 6, 1981 | Siding Spring | S. J. Bus | (5) | 2.4 km | MPC · JPL |
| 96176 | 1981 EZ_{44} | — | March 7, 1981 | Siding Spring | S. J. Bus | · | 2.3 km | MPC · JPL |
| 96177 | 1984 BC | — | January 30, 1984 | Palomar | E. F. Helin, R. S. Dunbar | T_{j} (2.78) · CYB | 3.4 km | MPC · JPL |
| 96178 Rochambeau | 1987 SA_{4} | Rochambeau | September 29, 1987 | Anderson Mesa | E. Bowell | · | 3.0 km | MPC · JPL |
| 96179 | 1988 DX_{4} | — | February 25, 1988 | Siding Spring | R. H. McNaught | · | 2.6 km | MPC · JPL |
| 96180 | 1988 SR_{2} | — | September 16, 1988 | Cerro Tololo | S. J. Bus | 3:2 | 10 km | MPC · JPL |
| 96181 | 1988 VW_{2} | — | November 8, 1988 | Kushiro | S. Ueda, H. Kaneda | · | 2.1 km | MPC · JPL |
| 96182 | 1989 RT_{1} | — | September 6, 1989 | Palomar | E. F. Helin | · | 2.6 km | MPC · JPL |
| 96183 | 1989 UG_{2} | — | October 27, 1989 | Palomar | E. F. Helin | · | 3.0 km | MPC · JPL |
| 96184 | 1990 QH_{3} | — | August 28, 1990 | Palomar | H. E. Holt | · | 4.9 km | MPC · JPL |
| 96185 | 1990 RJ_{7} | — | September 13, 1990 | La Silla | H. Debehogne | · | 5.1 km | MPC · JPL |
| 96186 | 1990 SF_{8} | — | September 22, 1990 | La Silla | E. W. Elst | · | 2.2 km | MPC · JPL |
| 96187 | 1990 UH_{4} | — | October 16, 1990 | La Silla | E. W. Elst | · | 9.4 km | MPC · JPL |
| 96188 | 1991 GC | — | April 8, 1991 | Palomar | E. F. Helin | PHO | 2.9 km | MPC · JPL |
| 96189 Pygmalion | 1991 NT_{3} | Pygmalion | July 6, 1991 | La Silla | H. Debehogne | AMO +1km | 3.6 km | MPC · JPL |
| 96190 | 1991 PD_{19} | — | August 2, 1991 | La Silla | E. W. Elst | · | 2.2 km | MPC · JPL |
| 96191 | 1991 TK_{9} | — | October 3, 1991 | Kitt Peak | Spacewatch | · | 3.2 km | MPC · JPL |
| 96192 Calgary | 1991 TZ_{15} | Calgary | October 6, 1991 | Palomar | Lowe, A. | V | 1.5 km | MPC · JPL |
| 96193 Edmonton | 1991 TG_{16} | Edmonton | October 6, 1991 | Palomar | Lowe, A. | · | 1.8 km | MPC · JPL |
| 96194 | 1991 VF_{6} | — | November 2, 1991 | La Silla | E. W. Elst | · | 4.8 km | MPC · JPL |
| 96195 | 1992 AW_{2} | — | January 1, 1992 | Kitt Peak | Spacewatch | · | 1.9 km | MPC · JPL |
| 96196 | 1992 EQ_{4} | — | March 1, 1992 | La Silla | UESAC | · | 1.6 km | MPC · JPL |
| 96197 | 1992 EF_{6} | — | March 1, 1992 | La Silla | UESAC | · | 4.1 km | MPC · JPL |
| 96198 | 1992 EF_{13} | — | March 2, 1992 | La Silla | UESAC | · | 2.9 km | MPC · JPL |
| 96199 | 1992 EY_{24} | — | March 4, 1992 | La Silla | UESAC | · | 1.7 km | MPC · JPL |
| 96200 Oschin | 1992 QR_{2} | Oschin | August 25, 1992 | Palomar | Lowe, A. | · | 4.1 km | MPC · JPL |

== 96201–96300 ==
back to top

| Designation | | | Discovery | | | Properties | | Ref |
| Permanent | Provisional | Named after | Date | Site | Discoverer(s) | Category | Diam. | Ref |
|---|---|---|---|---|---|---|---|---|
| 96201 | 1992 RK_{3} | — | September 2, 1992 | La Silla | E. W. Elst | · | 3.6 km | MPC · JPL |
| 96202 | 1992 RR_{7} | — | September 2, 1992 | La Silla | E. W. Elst | · | 2.2 km | MPC · JPL |
| 96203 | 1992 SH_{3} | — | September 24, 1992 | Kitt Peak | Spacewatch | · | 2.0 km | MPC · JPL |
| 96204 | 1992 SN_{5} | — | September 25, 1992 | Kitt Peak | Spacewatch | · | 5.4 km | MPC · JPL |
| 96205 Ararat | 1992 ST_{16} | Ararat | September 24, 1992 | Tautenburg Observatory | F. Börngen, L. D. Schmadel | · | 2.2 km | MPC · JPL |
| 96206 Eschenberg | 1992 SU_{17} | Eschenberg | September 24, 1992 | Tautenburg Observatory | F. Börngen, L. D. Schmadel | · | 5.6 km | MPC · JPL |
| 96207 | 1993 FK_{4} | — | March 17, 1993 | La Silla | UESAC | · | 1.9 km | MPC · JPL |
| 96208 | 1993 FY_{6} | — | March 17, 1993 | La Silla | UESAC | · | 2.4 km | MPC · JPL |
| 96209 | 1993 FA_{9} | — | March 17, 1993 | La Silla | UESAC | · | 2.0 km | MPC · JPL |
| 96210 | 1993 FR_{14} | — | March 17, 1993 | La Silla | UESAC | MRX | 2.4 km | MPC · JPL |
| 96211 | 1993 FU_{23} | — | March 21, 1993 | La Silla | UESAC | · | 5.8 km | MPC · JPL |
| 96212 | 1993 FK_{27} | — | March 21, 1993 | La Silla | UESAC | · | 1.6 km | MPC · JPL |
| 96213 | 1993 FZ_{30} | — | March 19, 1993 | La Silla | UESAC | · | 1.9 km | MPC · JPL |
| 96214 | 1993 FB_{42} | — | March 19, 1993 | La Silla | UESAC | (5) | 2.6 km | MPC · JPL |
| 96215 | 1993 QR_{9} | — | August 20, 1993 | La Silla | E. W. Elst | · | 1.6 km | MPC · JPL |
| 96216 | 1993 RM_{1} | — | September 15, 1993 | Kitt Peak | Spacewatch | · | 3.7 km | MPC · JPL |
| 96217 Gronchi | 1993 RP_{2} | Gronchi | September 14, 1993 | Cima Ekar | A. Boattini, V. Goretti | · | 2.2 km | MPC · JPL |
| 96218 | 1993 RZ_{14} | — | September 15, 1993 | La Silla | E. W. Elst | H | 880 m | MPC · JPL |
| 96219 | 1993 SH_{5} | — | September 19, 1993 | Caussols | E. W. Elst | · | 6.3 km | MPC · JPL |
| 96220 | 1993 SY_{13} | — | September 16, 1993 | La Silla | H. Debehogne, E. W. Elst | · | 5.3 km | MPC · JPL |
| 96221 | 1993 TC_{2} | — | October 15, 1993 | Kitami | K. Endate, K. Watanabe | · | 3.1 km | MPC · JPL |
| 96222 | 1993 TU_{9} | — | October 12, 1993 | Kitt Peak | Spacewatch | · | 4.7 km | MPC · JPL |
| 96223 | 1993 TG_{14} | — | October 9, 1993 | La Silla | E. W. Elst | · | 1.9 km | MPC · JPL |
| 96224 | 1993 TY_{17} | — | October 9, 1993 | La Silla | E. W. Elst | · | 2.0 km | MPC · JPL |
| 96225 | 1993 TP_{18} | — | October 9, 1993 | La Silla | E. W. Elst | · | 5.0 km | MPC · JPL |
| 96226 | 1993 TS_{18} | — | October 9, 1993 | La Silla | E. W. Elst | MAS | 3.8 km | MPC · JPL |
| 96227 | 1993 TS_{22} | — | October 9, 1993 | La Silla | E. W. Elst | EOS | 3.2 km | MPC · JPL |
| 96228 | 1993 TV_{25} | — | October 9, 1993 | La Silla | E. W. Elst | · | 2.8 km | MPC · JPL |
| 96229 | 1993 TE_{30} | — | October 9, 1993 | La Silla | E. W. Elst | MAS | 1.3 km | MPC · JPL |
| 96230 | 1993 TZ_{35} | — | October 11, 1993 | La Silla | E. W. Elst | · | 2.7 km | MPC · JPL |
| 96231 | 1993 TF_{39} | — | October 9, 1993 | La Silla | E. W. Elst | · | 2.2 km | MPC · JPL |
| 96232 | 1993 TU_{39} | — | October 9, 1993 | La Silla | E. W. Elst | · | 1.7 km | MPC · JPL |
| 96233 | 1993 TA_{41} | — | October 9, 1993 | La Silla | E. W. Elst | · | 2.1 km | MPC · JPL |
| 96234 | 1993 UG | — | October 20, 1993 | Palomar | E. F. Helin | H | 1.3 km | MPC · JPL |
| 96235 | 1993 UB_{5} | — | October 20, 1993 | La Silla | E. W. Elst | · | 1.7 km | MPC · JPL |
| 96236 | 1993 UL_{7} | — | October 20, 1993 | La Silla | E. W. Elst | · | 3.5 km | MPC · JPL |
| 96237 | 1993 VL_{1} | — | November 4, 1993 | Siding Spring | R. H. McNaught | · | 7.2 km | MPC · JPL |
| 96238 | 1994 AF_{4} | — | January 4, 1994 | Kitt Peak | Spacewatch | NYS | 2.1 km | MPC · JPL |
| 96239 | 1994 AC_{7} | — | January 7, 1994 | Kitt Peak | Spacewatch | · | 7.4 km | MPC · JPL |
| 96240 | 1994 AE_{7} | — | January 7, 1994 | Kitt Peak | Spacewatch | · | 3.6 km | MPC · JPL |
| 96241 | 1994 AG_{7} | — | January 7, 1994 | Kitt Peak | Spacewatch | MAS | 1.3 km | MPC · JPL |
| 96242 | 1994 AB_{17} | — | January 13, 1994 | Kitt Peak | Spacewatch | · | 2.1 km | MPC · JPL |
| 96243 | 1994 CF_{6} | — | February 12, 1994 | Kitt Peak | Spacewatch | · | 5.4 km | MPC · JPL |
| 96244 | 1994 CA_{16} | — | February 8, 1994 | La Silla | E. W. Elst | · | 2.4 km | MPC · JPL |
| 96245 | 1994 CA_{18} | — | February 8, 1994 | La Silla | E. W. Elst | NYS · | 4.1 km | MPC · JPL |
| 96246 | 1994 JZ_{5} | — | May 4, 1994 | Kitt Peak | Spacewatch | · | 2.7 km | MPC · JPL |
| 96247 | 1994 PT_{3} | — | August 10, 1994 | La Silla | E. W. Elst | · | 4.0 km | MPC · JPL |
| 96248 | 1994 PX_{6} | — | August 10, 1994 | La Silla | E. W. Elst | EUN | 1.9 km | MPC · JPL |
| 96249 | 1994 PD_{22} | — | August 12, 1994 | La Silla | E. W. Elst | · | 930 m | MPC · JPL |
| 96250 | 1994 PE_{25} | — | August 12, 1994 | La Silla | E. W. Elst | · | 4.3 km | MPC · JPL |
| 96251 | 1994 RL_{26} | — | September 5, 1994 | La Silla | E. W. Elst | HOF | 4.8 km | MPC · JPL |
| 96252 | 1994 WB_{6} | — | November 28, 1994 | Kitt Peak | Spacewatch | · | 1.6 km | MPC · JPL |
| 96253 | 1995 BY_{1} | — | January 28, 1995 | Oohira | T. Urata | · | 2.0 km | MPC · JPL |
| 96254 Hoyo | 1995 DT_{2} | Hoyo | February 27, 1995 | Kuma Kogen | A. Nakamura | · | 1.5 km | MPC · JPL |
| 96255 | 1995 ES_{6} | — | March 2, 1995 | Kitt Peak | Spacewatch | THM · | 4.3 km | MPC · JPL |
| 96256 | 1995 HS_{2} | — | April 25, 1995 | Kitt Peak | Spacewatch | NYS | 2.5 km | MPC · JPL |
| 96257 Roberto | 1995 JE | Roberto | May 3, 1995 | La Silla | Mottola, S. | · | 2.5 km | MPC · JPL |
| 96258 | 1995 KQ_{4} | — | May 27, 1995 | Kitt Peak | Spacewatch | · | 1.8 km | MPC · JPL |
| 96259 | 1995 MV_{1} | — | June 23, 1995 | Kitt Peak | Spacewatch | · | 2.3 km | MPC · JPL |
| 96260 | 1995 MW_{3} | — | June 29, 1995 | Kitt Peak | Spacewatch | · | 7.8 km | MPC · JPL |
| 96261 | 1995 OA_{4} | — | July 22, 1995 | Kitt Peak | Spacewatch | NYS | 2.2 km | MPC · JPL |
| 96262 | 1995 PF | — | August 1, 1995 | Farra d'Isonzo | Farra d'Isonzo | EUN | 2.8 km | MPC · JPL |
| 96263 Lorettacavicchi | 1995 SE_{2} | Lorettacavicchi | September 23, 1995 | Bologna | San Vittore | EUN | 2.5 km | MPC · JPL |
| 96264 | 1995 SF_{17} | — | September 18, 1995 | Kitt Peak | Spacewatch | (5) | 2.8 km | MPC · JPL |
| 96265 | 1995 SX_{23} | — | September 19, 1995 | Kitt Peak | Spacewatch | · | 1.9 km | MPC · JPL |
| 96266 | 1995 SB_{33} | — | September 21, 1995 | Kitt Peak | Spacewatch | (5) | 2.0 km | MPC · JPL |
| 96267 | 1995 SK_{48} | — | September 26, 1995 | Kitt Peak | Spacewatch | · | 3.2 km | MPC · JPL |
| 96268 Tomcarr | 1995 SA_{55} | Tomcarr | September 20, 1995 | Catalina Station | T. B. Spahr | · | 3.3 km | MPC · JPL |
| 96269 | 1995 SA_{67} | — | September 17, 1995 | Kitt Peak | Spacewatch | · | 1.5 km | MPC · JPL |
| 96270 | 1995 SY_{68} | — | September 27, 1995 | Kitt Peak | Spacewatch | · | 2.0 km | MPC · JPL |
| 96271 | 1995 SH_{79} | — | September 21, 1995 | Kitt Peak | Spacewatch | · | 2.7 km | MPC · JPL |
| 96272 | 1995 SZ_{88} | — | September 29, 1995 | Kitt Peak | Spacewatch | · | 3.0 km | MPC · JPL |
| 96273 | 1995 UD_{15} | — | October 17, 1995 | Kitt Peak | Spacewatch | · | 1.6 km | MPC · JPL |
| 96274 | 1995 UB_{32} | — | October 21, 1995 | Kitt Peak | Spacewatch | (5) | 2.3 km | MPC · JPL |
| 96275 | 1995 UG_{66} | — | October 17, 1995 | Kitt Peak | Spacewatch | · | 3.7 km | MPC · JPL |
| 96276 | 1995 VG_{11} | — | November 15, 1995 | Kitt Peak | Spacewatch | · | 4.9 km | MPC · JPL |
| 96277 | 1995 WN_{4} | — | November 20, 1995 | Oizumi | T. Kobayashi | · | 2.8 km | MPC · JPL |
| 96278 | 1995 WN_{19} | — | November 17, 1995 | Kitt Peak | Spacewatch | EUN | 2.2 km | MPC · JPL |
| 96279 | 1995 WE_{20} | — | November 17, 1995 | Kitt Peak | Spacewatch | · | 3.6 km | MPC · JPL |
| 96280 | 1995 WZ_{31} | — | November 19, 1995 | Kitt Peak | Spacewatch | · | 2.4 km | MPC · JPL |
| 96281 | 1995 WC_{37} | — | November 21, 1995 | Kitt Peak | Spacewatch | · | 3.1 km | MPC · JPL |
| 96282 | 1995 WX_{38} | — | November 23, 1995 | Kitt Peak | Spacewatch | · | 3.8 km | MPC · JPL |
| 96283 | 1995 YQ_{5} | — | December 16, 1995 | Kitt Peak | Spacewatch | · | 2.2 km | MPC · JPL |
| 96284 | 1995 YY_{9} | — | December 18, 1995 | Kitt Peak | Spacewatch | · | 3.1 km | MPC · JPL |
| 96285 | 1995 YG_{23} | — | December 20, 1995 | Haleakala | NEAT | · | 3.0 km | MPC · JPL |
| 96286 | 1996 AE_{13} | — | January 15, 1996 | Kitt Peak | Spacewatch | HOF | 5.4 km | MPC · JPL |
| 96287 | 1996 BW_{8} | — | January 20, 1996 | Kitt Peak | Spacewatch | GEF | 2.1 km | MPC · JPL |
| 96288 | 1996 GD_{6} | — | April 11, 1996 | Kitt Peak | Spacewatch | · | 2.1 km | MPC · JPL |
| 96289 | 1996 HZ_{12} | — | April 17, 1996 | La Silla | E. W. Elst | LUT | 10 km | MPC · JPL |
| 96290 | 1996 HZ_{17} | — | April 18, 1996 | La Silla | E. W. Elst | · | 2.4 km | MPC · JPL |
| 96291 | 1996 HQ_{20} | — | April 18, 1996 | La Silla | E. W. Elst | · | 1.5 km | MPC · JPL |
| 96292 | 1996 HR_{20} | — | April 18, 1996 | La Silla | E. W. Elst | EOS | 4.4 km | MPC · JPL |
| 96293 | 1996 HV_{22} | — | April 20, 1996 | La Silla | E. W. Elst | · | 1.6 km | MPC · JPL |
| 96294 | 1996 JE_{2} | — | May 11, 1996 | Xinglong | SCAP | TIR | 6.4 km | MPC · JPL |
| 96295 | 1996 JF_{7} | — | May 11, 1996 | Kitt Peak | Spacewatch | L5 | 19 km | MPC · JPL |
| 96296 Nanhangda | 1996 OK_{1} | Nanhangda | July 20, 1996 | Xinglong | SCAP | (10654) · fast | 7.9 km | MPC · JPL |
| 96297 | 1996 RY_{25} | — | September 13, 1996 | Haleakala | NEAT | · | 2.3 km | MPC · JPL |
| 96298 | 1996 RE_{26} | — | September 6, 1996 | Siding Spring | G. J. Garradd | H | 2.9 km | MPC · JPL |
| 96299 | 1996 SO | — | September 18, 1996 | Prescott | P. G. Comba | · | 1.9 km | MPC · JPL |
| 96300 | 1996 SC_{8} | — | September 21, 1996 | Xinglong | SCAP | NYS | 2.0 km | MPC · JPL |

== 96301–96400 ==
back to top

| Designation | | | Discovery | | | Properties | | Ref |
| Permanent | Provisional | Named after | Date | Site | Discoverer(s) | Category | Diam. | Ref |
|---|---|---|---|---|---|---|---|---|
| 96301 | 1996 TK_{30} | — | October 7, 1996 | Kitt Peak | Spacewatch | · | 3.2 km | MPC · JPL |
| 96302 | 1996 TL_{39} | — | October 8, 1996 | La Silla | E. W. Elst | NYS | 2.9 km | MPC · JPL |
| 96303 | 1996 UM_{5} | — | October 17, 1996 | La Silla | C.-I. Lagerkvist | · | 1.7 km | MPC · JPL |
| 96304 | 1996 VH_{16} | — | November 5, 1996 | Kitt Peak | Spacewatch | · | 1.6 km | MPC · JPL |
| 96305 | 1996 VC_{36} | — | November 10, 1996 | Kitt Peak | Spacewatch | · | 3.1 km | MPC · JPL |
| 96306 | 1996 WO_{2} | — | November 20, 1996 | Xinglong | SCAP | · | 2.8 km | MPC · JPL |
| 96307 | 1996 XT_{2} | — | December 4, 1996 | Pleiade | P. Antolini, Castellani, F. | · | 5.2 km | MPC · JPL |
| 96308 | 1996 XX_{22} | — | December 12, 1996 | Kitt Peak | Spacewatch | · | 3.0 km | MPC · JPL |
| 96309 | 1996 XG_{23} | — | December 12, 1996 | Kitt Peak | Spacewatch | · | 2.6 km | MPC · JPL |
| 96310 | 1996 XA_{26} | — | December 14, 1996 | Goodricke-Pigott | R. A. Tucker | · | 4.2 km | MPC · JPL |
| 96311 | 1996 XW_{27} | — | December 11, 1996 | Kitt Peak | Spacewatch | · | 2.2 km | MPC · JPL |
| 96312 | 1996 XS_{35} | — | December 12, 1996 | Kitt Peak | Spacewatch | NYS | 1.8 km | MPC · JPL |
| 96313 | 1997 AL_{3} | — | January 3, 1997 | Kitt Peak | Spacewatch | · | 4.2 km | MPC · JPL |
| 96314 | 1997 AL_{6} | — | January 8, 1997 | Prescott | P. G. Comba | HNS | 3.1 km | MPC · JPL |
| 96315 | 1997 AP_{10} | — | January 9, 1997 | Kitt Peak | Spacewatch | APO +1km | 1.4 km | MPC · JPL |
| 96316 | 1997 AA_{21} | — | January 11, 1997 | Kitt Peak | Spacewatch | · | 2.6 km | MPC · JPL |
| 96317 | 1997 BW_{2} | — | January 30, 1997 | Oizumi | T. Kobayashi | EUN | 2.4 km | MPC · JPL |
| 96318 | 1997 CN_{1} | — | February 1, 1997 | Oizumi | T. Kobayashi | (5) | 3.2 km | MPC · JPL |
| 96319 | 1997 CL_{5} | — | February 1, 1997 | Chichibu | N. Satō | · | 4.6 km | MPC · JPL |
| 96320 | 1997 CV_{15} | — | February 6, 1997 | Kitt Peak | Spacewatch | · | 3.6 km | MPC · JPL |
| 96321 | 1997 CW_{16} | — | February 6, 1997 | Chichibu | N. Satō | · | 3.7 km | MPC · JPL |
| 96322 | 1997 CN_{20} | — | February 12, 1997 | Oizumi | T. Kobayashi | H | 1.5 km | MPC · JPL |
| 96323 | 1997 CE_{26} | — | February 14, 1997 | Oizumi | T. Kobayashi | H | 1.3 km | MPC · JPL |
| 96324 | 1997 EV_{2} | — | March 4, 1997 | Oizumi | T. Kobayashi | · | 2.9 km | MPC · JPL |
| 96325 | 1997 EG_{7} | — | March 3, 1997 | Kitt Peak | Spacewatch | · | 3.4 km | MPC · JPL |
| 96326 | 1997 EN_{11} | — | March 3, 1997 | Xinglong | SCAP | · | 3.6 km | MPC · JPL |
| 96327 Ullmann | 1997 EJ_{50} | Ullmann | March 5, 1997 | La Silla | E. W. Elst | H | 1.8 km | MPC · JPL |
| 96328 | 1997 GC | — | April 2, 1997 | Ondřejov | L. Kotková | · | 2.7 km | MPC · JPL |
| 96329 | 1997 GY_{8} | — | April 3, 1997 | Socorro | LINEAR | (5) | 2.1 km | MPC · JPL |
| 96330 | 1997 GW_{9} | — | April 3, 1997 | Socorro | LINEAR | · | 3.3 km | MPC · JPL |
| 96331 | 1997 GC_{21} | — | April 6, 1997 | Socorro | LINEAR | MRX | 1.9 km | MPC · JPL |
| 96332 | 1997 GQ_{34} | — | April 3, 1997 | Socorro | LINEAR | · | 4.9 km | MPC · JPL |
| 96333 | 1997 GL_{36} | — | April 6, 1997 | Socorro | LINEAR | MIS | 4.2 km | MPC · JPL |
| 96334 | 1997 HH_{3} | — | April 30, 1997 | Socorro | LINEAR | H | 1.5 km | MPC · JPL |
| 96335 | 1997 JW_{9} | — | May 9, 1997 | Mauna Kea | Veillet, C. | · | 5.3 km | MPC · JPL |
| 96336 | 1997 KT_{3} | — | May 28, 1997 | Kitt Peak | Spacewatch | · | 5.9 km | MPC · JPL |
| 96337 | 1997 LG_{2} | — | June 5, 1997 | Kitt Peak | Spacewatch | L5 · slow | 11 km | MPC · JPL |
| 96338 | 1997 LF_{5} | — | June 1, 1997 | Kitt Peak | Spacewatch | EOS | 3.3 km | MPC · JPL |
| 96339 | 1997 MD_{5} | — | June 29, 1997 | Socorro | LINEAR | · | 3.1 km | MPC · JPL |
| 96340 | 1997 NV_{4} | — | July 8, 1997 | Caussols | ODAS | ADE | 4.8 km | MPC · JPL |
| 96341 | 1997 OX_{1} | — | July 31, 1997 | Farra d'Isonzo | Farra d'Isonzo | · | 1.6 km | MPC · JPL |
| 96342 | 1997 PF_{2} | — | August 8, 1997 | Ondřejov | P. Pravec | · | 1.2 km | MPC · JPL |
| 96343 | 1997 RS_{1} | — | September 3, 1997 | Bédoin | P. Antonini | · | 6.6 km | MPC · JPL |
| 96344 Scottweaver | 1997 RH_{3} | Scottweaver | September 5, 1997 | Alfred University | Robbins, A. | · | 1.4 km | MPC · JPL |
| 96345 | 1997 RF_{5} | — | September 8, 1997 | Caussols | ODAS | · | 7.6 km | MPC · JPL |
| 96346 | 1997 SC_{10} | — | September 23, 1997 | Xinglong | SCAP | · | 2.2 km | MPC · JPL |
| 96347 | 1997 SS_{16} | — | September 28, 1997 | Kitt Peak | Spacewatch | · | 3.2 km | MPC · JPL |
| 96348 Toshiyukimariko | 1997 TU_{26} | Toshiyukimariko | October 7, 1997 | Nanyo | T. Okuni | · | 2.3 km | MPC · JPL |
| 96349 | 1997 US_{7} | — | October 23, 1997 | Ondřejov | L. Kotková | · | 2.3 km | MPC · JPL |
| 96350 | 1997 UA_{15} | — | October 26, 1997 | Nachi-Katsuura | Y. Shimizu, T. Urata | · | 2.1 km | MPC · JPL |
| 96351 | 1997 UA_{18} | — | October 28, 1997 | Kitt Peak | Spacewatch | · | 2.2 km | MPC · JPL |
| 96352 | 1997 VH_{2} | — | November 1, 1997 | Oizumi | T. Kobayashi | · | 2.7 km | MPC · JPL |
| 96353 | 1997 VF_{3} | — | November 6, 1997 | Oizumi | T. Kobayashi | · | 1.8 km | MPC · JPL |
| 96354 | 1997 VO_{3} | — | November 6, 1997 | Oizumi | T. Kobayashi | · | 1.6 km | MPC · JPL |
| 96355 | 1997 VR_{6} | — | November 11, 1997 | Kleť | Kleť | · | 1.4 km | MPC · JPL |
| 96356 | 1997 VH_{8} | — | November 10, 1997 | Ondřejov | L. Kotková | · | 1.8 km | MPC · JPL |
| 96357 | 1997 WE_{5} | — | November 23, 1997 | Kitt Peak | Spacewatch | · | 1.3 km | MPC · JPL |
| 96358 | 1997 WK_{5} | — | November 23, 1997 | Kitt Peak | Spacewatch | · | 1.3 km | MPC · JPL |
| 96359 | 1997 WP_{10} | — | November 22, 1997 | Kitt Peak | Spacewatch | · | 860 m | MPC · JPL |
| 96360 | 1997 WW_{10} | — | November 22, 1997 | Kitt Peak | Spacewatch | · | 3.7 km | MPC · JPL |
| 96361 | 1997 WG_{12} | — | November 22, 1997 | Kitt Peak | Spacewatch | · | 2.8 km | MPC · JPL |
| 96362 | 1997 WH_{13} | — | November 23, 1997 | Kitt Peak | Spacewatch | · | 1.8 km | MPC · JPL |
| 96363 | 1997 WD_{16} | — | November 25, 1997 | Kitt Peak | Spacewatch | · | 1.5 km | MPC · JPL |
| 96364 | 1997 WD_{18} | — | November 23, 1997 | Kitt Peak | Spacewatch | · | 2.3 km | MPC · JPL |
| 96365 | 1997 WY_{25} | — | November 22, 1997 | Kitt Peak | Spacewatch | · | 2.9 km | MPC · JPL |
| 96366 | 1997 WS_{37} | — | November 29, 1997 | Socorro | LINEAR | · | 2.1 km | MPC · JPL |
| 96367 | 1997 WK_{53} | — | November 29, 1997 | Socorro | LINEAR | · | 2.2 km | MPC · JPL |
| 96368 | 1997 XH_{2} | — | December 3, 1997 | Chichibu | N. Satō | NYS | 2.4 km | MPC · JPL |
| 96369 | 1997 XM_{2} | — | December 3, 1997 | Chichibu | N. Satō | · | 2.1 km | MPC · JPL |
| 96370 | 1997 XS_{5} | — | December 1, 1997 | Xinglong | SCAP | (2076) | 1.5 km | MPC · JPL |
| 96371 | 1997 XC_{8} | — | December 7, 1997 | Caussols | ODAS | · | 2.2 km | MPC · JPL |
| 96372 | 1997 YP_{4} | — | December 24, 1997 | Chichibu | N. Satō | · | 2.3 km | MPC · JPL |
| 96373 | 1997 YH_{7} | — | December 27, 1997 | Oizumi | T. Kobayashi | · | 2.5 km | MPC · JPL |
| 96374 | 1997 YZ_{13} | — | December 31, 1997 | Oizumi | T. Kobayashi | · | 2.4 km | MPC · JPL |
| 96375 | 1997 YS_{17} | — | December 31, 1997 | Kitt Peak | Spacewatch | · | 2.3 km | MPC · JPL |
| 96376 | 1998 AY | — | January 5, 1998 | Oizumi | T. Kobayashi | · | 2.2 km | MPC · JPL |
| 96377 | 1998 AU_{6} | — | January 4, 1998 | Xinglong | SCAP | PHO | 1.8 km | MPC · JPL |
| 96378 | 1998 BA | — | January 16, 1998 | Oizumi | T. Kobayashi | · | 2.1 km | MPC · JPL |
| 96379 | 1998 BH | — | January 18, 1998 | Modra | L. Kornoš, P. Kolény | V | 1.5 km | MPC · JPL |
| 96380 | 1998 BG_{1} | — | January 19, 1998 | Oizumi | T. Kobayashi | (2076) | 2.3 km | MPC · JPL |
| 96381 | 1998 BS_{5} | — | January 22, 1998 | Kitt Peak | Spacewatch | (2076) | 1.4 km | MPC · JPL |
| 96382 | 1998 BW_{7} | — | January 22, 1998 | Stroncone | Santa Lucia | · | 1.6 km | MPC · JPL |
| 96383 | 1998 BJ_{15} | — | January 24, 1998 | Haleakala | NEAT | PHO | 2.2 km | MPC · JPL |
| 96384 | 1998 BG_{17} | — | January 22, 1998 | Kitt Peak | Spacewatch | · | 1.8 km | MPC · JPL |
| 96385 | 1998 BC_{25} | — | January 28, 1998 | Oizumi | T. Kobayashi | V | 2.1 km | MPC · JPL |
| 96386 | 1998 BO_{41} | — | January 26, 1998 | Haleakala | NEAT | · | 3.5 km | MPC · JPL |
| 96387 | 1998 BW_{41} | — | January 19, 1998 | Goodricke-Pigott | R. A. Tucker | · | 2.6 km | MPC · JPL |
| 96388 | 1998 BD_{42} | — | January 26, 1998 | Dossobuono | Lai, L. | · | 1.8 km | MPC · JPL |
| 96389 | 1998 BA_{48} | — | January 26, 1998 | Kitt Peak | Spacewatch | GEF | 2.6 km | MPC · JPL |
| 96390 | 1998 CQ_{1} | — | February 6, 1998 | Farra d'Isonzo | Farra d'Isonzo | · | 3.4 km | MPC · JPL |
| 96391 | 1998 CZ_{1} | — | February 6, 1998 | Xinglong | SCAP | EUN | 3.7 km | MPC · JPL |
| 96392 | 1998 DH | — | February 17, 1998 | Modra | A. Galád, Pravda, A. | · | 3.2 km | MPC · JPL |
| 96393 | 1998 DF_{1} | — | February 19, 1998 | Kleť | Kleť | · | 2.2 km | MPC · JPL |
| 96394 | 1998 DC_{12} | — | February 23, 1998 | Kitt Peak | Spacewatch | MAS | 1.7 km | MPC · JPL |
| 96395 | 1998 DF_{12} | — | February 23, 1998 | Kitt Peak | Spacewatch | · | 2.3 km | MPC · JPL |
| 96396 | 1998 DQ_{12} | — | February 24, 1998 | Kitt Peak | Spacewatch | MAS | 1.7 km | MPC · JPL |
| 96397 | 1998 DT_{13} | — | February 27, 1998 | Caussols | ODAS | NYS | 2.5 km | MPC · JPL |
| 96398 | 1998 DX_{13} | — | February 27, 1998 | Caussols | ODAS | NYS | 2.0 km | MPC · JPL |
| 96399 | 1998 DE_{15} | — | February 22, 1998 | Haleakala | NEAT | · | 5.1 km | MPC · JPL |
| 96400 | 1998 DK_{15} | — | February 22, 1998 | Haleakala | NEAT | NYS | 2.5 km | MPC · JPL |

== 96401–96500 ==
back to top

| Designation | | | Discovery | | | Properties | | Ref |
| Permanent | Provisional | Named after | Date | Site | Discoverer(s) | Category | Diam. | Ref |
|---|---|---|---|---|---|---|---|---|
| 96401 | 1998 DX_{15} | — | February 24, 1998 | Haleakala | NEAT | PHO | 4.7 km | MPC · JPL |
| 96402 | 1998 DE_{18} | — | February 23, 1998 | Kitt Peak | Spacewatch | V | 1.3 km | MPC · JPL |
| 96403 | 1998 DT_{22} | — | February 24, 1998 | Kitt Peak | Spacewatch | V | 1.3 km | MPC · JPL |
| 96404 | 1998 DB_{28} | — | February 23, 1998 | Kitt Peak | Spacewatch | · | 1.4 km | MPC · JPL |
| 96405 | 1998 ES | — | March 2, 1998 | Caussols | ODAS | ERI | 5.1 km | MPC · JPL |
| 96406 | 1998 EW_{7} | — | March 2, 1998 | Xinglong | SCAP | · | 2.4 km | MPC · JPL |
| 96407 | 1998 EU_{8} | — | March 5, 1998 | Xinglong | SCAP | MAS | 1.2 km | MPC · JPL |
| 96408 | 1998 EV_{9} | — | March 5, 1998 | Xinglong | SCAP | · | 2.3 km | MPC · JPL |
| 96409 | 1998 EW_{10} | — | March 1, 1998 | La Silla | E. W. Elst | EUN | 3.3 km | MPC · JPL |
| 96410 | 1998 ER_{12} | — | March 1, 1998 | La Silla | E. W. Elst | NYS | 1.9 km | MPC · JPL |
| 96411 | 1998 EM_{13} | — | March 1, 1998 | La Silla | E. W. Elst | · | 3.1 km | MPC · JPL |
| 96412 | 1998 EC_{14} | — | March 1, 1998 | La Silla | E. W. Elst | · | 3.3 km | MPC · JPL |
| 96413 | 1998 ET_{14} | — | March 1, 1998 | La Silla | E. W. Elst | · | 1.9 km | MPC · JPL |
| 96414 | 1998 EZ_{19} | — | March 3, 1998 | La Silla | E. W. Elst | · | 2.2 km | MPC · JPL |
| 96415 | 1998 FX_{4} | — | March 22, 1998 | Prescott | P. G. Comba | · | 2.1 km | MPC · JPL |
| 96416 | 1998 FD_{5} | — | March 22, 1998 | Socorro | LINEAR | PHO | 2.4 km | MPC · JPL |
| 96417 | 1998 FK_{6} | — | March 18, 1998 | Kitt Peak | Spacewatch | NYS | 2.7 km | MPC · JPL |
| 96418 | 1998 FC_{11} | — | March 25, 1998 | Caussols | ODAS | · | 4.1 km | MPC · JPL |
| 96419 | 1998 FN_{16} | — | March 20, 1998 | Socorro | LINEAR | slow | 2.9 km | MPC · JPL |
| 96420 | 1998 FL_{18} | — | March 20, 1998 | Socorro | LINEAR | NYS | 3.6 km | MPC · JPL |
| 96421 | 1998 FJ_{30} | — | March 20, 1998 | Socorro | LINEAR | NYS | 2.0 km | MPC · JPL |
| 96422 | 1998 FO_{30} | — | March 20, 1998 | Socorro | LINEAR | NYS | 2.6 km | MPC · JPL |
| 96423 | 1998 FK_{31} | — | March 20, 1998 | Socorro | LINEAR | PHO | 2.4 km | MPC · JPL |
| 96424 | 1998 FX_{32} | — | March 20, 1998 | Socorro | LINEAR | · | 1.8 km | MPC · JPL |
| 96425 | 1998 FB_{35} | — | March 20, 1998 | Socorro | LINEAR | · | 2.5 km | MPC · JPL |
| 96426 | 1998 FE_{37} | — | March 20, 1998 | Socorro | LINEAR | · | 2.5 km | MPC · JPL |
| 96427 | 1998 FP_{42} | — | March 20, 1998 | Socorro | LINEAR | · | 5.4 km | MPC · JPL |
| 96428 | 1998 FB_{43} | — | March 20, 1998 | Socorro | LINEAR | · | 2.3 km | MPC · JPL |
| 96429 | 1998 FN_{52} | — | March 20, 1998 | Socorro | LINEAR | · | 2.4 km | MPC · JPL |
| 96430 | 1998 FL_{55} | — | March 20, 1998 | Socorro | LINEAR | V | 1.4 km | MPC · JPL |
| 96431 | 1998 FW_{57} | — | March 20, 1998 | Socorro | LINEAR | NYS | 2.7 km | MPC · JPL |
| 96432 | 1998 FY_{58} | — | March 20, 1998 | Socorro | LINEAR | · | 1.9 km | MPC · JPL |
| 96433 | 1998 FH_{59} | — | March 20, 1998 | Socorro | LINEAR | V | 1.3 km | MPC · JPL |
| 96434 | 1998 FR_{63} | — | March 20, 1998 | Socorro | LINEAR | · | 3.1 km | MPC · JPL |
| 96435 | 1998 FT_{63} | — | March 20, 1998 | Socorro | LINEAR | NYS | 2.2 km | MPC · JPL |
| 96436 | 1998 FS_{72} | — | March 28, 1998 | Woomera | F. B. Zoltowski | V | 2.4 km | MPC · JPL |
| 96437 | 1998 FR_{77} | — | March 24, 1998 | Socorro | LINEAR | · | 3.5 km | MPC · JPL |
| 96438 | 1998 FQ_{78} | — | March 24, 1998 | Socorro | LINEAR | · | 1.7 km | MPC · JPL |
| 96439 | 1998 FB_{79} | — | March 24, 1998 | Socorro | LINEAR | EUN | 3.1 km | MPC · JPL |
| 96440 | 1998 FD_{79} | — | March 24, 1998 | Socorro | LINEAR | · | 2.6 km | MPC · JPL |
| 96441 | 1998 FL_{79} | — | March 24, 1998 | Socorro | LINEAR | V | 1.5 km | MPC · JPL |
| 96442 | 1998 FY_{90} | — | March 24, 1998 | Socorro | LINEAR | · | 3.6 km | MPC · JPL |
| 96443 | 1998 FA_{106} | — | March 31, 1998 | Socorro | LINEAR | · | 3.4 km | MPC · JPL |
| 96444 | 1998 FR_{106} | — | March 31, 1998 | Socorro | LINEAR | · | 4.5 km | MPC · JPL |
| 96445 | 1998 FM_{115} | — | March 31, 1998 | Socorro | LINEAR | · | 3.1 km | MPC · JPL |
| 96446 | 1998 FS_{122} | — | March 20, 1998 | Socorro | LINEAR | NYS · | 4.6 km | MPC · JPL |
| 96447 | 1998 FH_{135} | — | March 22, 1998 | Socorro | LINEAR | · | 2.1 km | MPC · JPL |
| 96448 | 1998 FS_{135} | — | March 28, 1998 | Socorro | LINEAR | · | 4.2 km | MPC · JPL |
| 96449 | 1998 GA_{1} | — | April 3, 1998 | Oohira | T. Urata | · | 3.4 km | MPC · JPL |
| 96450 | 1998 GS_{6} | — | April 2, 1998 | Socorro | LINEAR | · | 5.4 km | MPC · JPL |
| 96451 | 1998 GW_{7} | — | April 2, 1998 | Socorro | LINEAR | EUN | 2.8 km | MPC · JPL |
| 96452 | 1998 GF_{9} | — | April 2, 1998 | Socorro | LINEAR | · | 4.0 km | MPC · JPL |
| 96453 | 1998 GP_{9} | — | April 2, 1998 | Socorro | LINEAR | MAR | 3.4 km | MPC · JPL |
| 96454 | 1998 HR | — | April 17, 1998 | Kitt Peak | Spacewatch | · | 2.6 km | MPC · JPL |
| 96455 | 1998 HQ_{21} | — | April 20, 1998 | Socorro | LINEAR | NYS | 1.9 km | MPC · JPL |
| 96456 | 1998 HS_{22} | — | April 20, 1998 | Socorro | LINEAR | · | 2.3 km | MPC · JPL |
| 96457 | 1998 HC_{24} | — | April 28, 1998 | Kitt Peak | Spacewatch | (5) | 2.7 km | MPC · JPL |
| 96458 | 1998 HV_{24} | — | April 17, 1998 | Kitt Peak | Spacewatch | · | 2.3 km | MPC · JPL |
| 96459 | 1998 HK_{34} | — | April 20, 1998 | Socorro | LINEAR | NYS | 3.0 km | MPC · JPL |
| 96460 | 1998 HJ_{36} | — | April 20, 1998 | Socorro | LINEAR | · | 2.4 km | MPC · JPL |
| 96461 | 1998 HS_{36} | — | April 20, 1998 | Socorro | LINEAR | · | 1.8 km | MPC · JPL |
| 96462 | 1998 HP_{44} | — | April 20, 1998 | Socorro | LINEAR | · | 3.2 km | MPC · JPL |
| 96463 | 1998 HW_{51} | — | April 30, 1998 | Anderson Mesa | LONEOS | ERI | 5.1 km | MPC · JPL |
| 96464 | 1998 HN_{54} | — | April 21, 1998 | Socorro | LINEAR | · | 3.4 km | MPC · JPL |
| 96465 | 1998 HX_{69} | — | April 21, 1998 | Socorro | LINEAR | · | 3.9 km | MPC · JPL |
| 96466 | 1998 HG_{72} | — | April 21, 1998 | Socorro | LINEAR | · | 2.3 km | MPC · JPL |
| 96467 | 1998 HE_{80} | — | April 21, 1998 | Socorro | LINEAR | NYS | 1.8 km | MPC · JPL |
| 96468 | 1998 HQ_{81} | — | April 21, 1998 | Socorro | LINEAR | MAS | 1.6 km | MPC · JPL |
| 96469 | 1998 HQ_{99} | — | April 21, 1998 | Socorro | LINEAR | EUN | 2.8 km | MPC · JPL |
| 96470 | 1998 HR_{102} | — | April 25, 1998 | La Silla | E. W. Elst | · | 2.4 km | MPC · JPL |
| 96471 | 1998 HM_{104} | — | April 23, 1998 | Socorro | LINEAR | · | 2.9 km | MPC · JPL |
| 96472 | 1998 HV_{107} | — | April 23, 1998 | Socorro | LINEAR | · | 4.9 km | MPC · JPL |
| 96473 | 1998 HG_{118} | — | April 23, 1998 | Socorro | LINEAR | · | 4.3 km | MPC · JPL |
| 96474 | 1998 HE_{119} | — | April 23, 1998 | Socorro | LINEAR | · | 2.4 km | MPC · JPL |
| 96475 | 1998 HL_{126} | — | April 25, 1998 | La Silla | E. W. Elst | · | 2.6 km | MPC · JPL |
| 96476 | 1998 HE_{127} | — | April 18, 1998 | Socorro | LINEAR | · | 2.5 km | MPC · JPL |
| 96477 | 1998 HA_{128} | — | April 18, 1998 | Socorro | LINEAR | MAS | 1.4 km | MPC · JPL |
| 96478 | 1998 HH_{129} | — | April 19, 1998 | Socorro | LINEAR | V | 1.5 km | MPC · JPL |
| 96479 | 1998 HS_{132} | — | April 19, 1998 | Socorro | LINEAR | · | 2.0 km | MPC · JPL |
| 96480 | 1998 HN_{139} | — | April 21, 1998 | Socorro | LINEAR | (2076) | 3.3 km | MPC · JPL |
| 96481 | 1998 HX_{140} | — | April 21, 1998 | Socorro | LINEAR | · | 2.9 km | MPC · JPL |
| 96482 | 1998 HP_{144} | — | April 21, 1998 | Socorro | LINEAR | · | 3.2 km | MPC · JPL |
| 96483 | 1998 HS_{144} | — | April 21, 1998 | Socorro | LINEAR | · | 2.5 km | MPC · JPL |
| 96484 | 1998 HJ_{146} | — | April 21, 1998 | Socorro | LINEAR | · | 3.6 km | MPC · JPL |
| 96485 | 1998 HE_{147} | — | April 23, 1998 | Socorro | LINEAR | EUN | 3.3 km | MPC · JPL |
| 96486 | 1998 HZ_{148} | — | April 25, 1998 | La Silla | E. W. Elst | EUN | 2.4 km | MPC · JPL |
| 96487 | 1998 JU_{1} | — | May 1, 1998 | Haleakala | NEAT | · | 5.5 km | MPC · JPL |
| 96488 | 1998 JO_{3} | — | May 6, 1998 | Caussols | ODAS | EUN | 3.8 km | MPC · JPL |
| 96489 | 1998 KN_{6} | — | May 23, 1998 | Socorro | LINEAR | · | 6.3 km | MPC · JPL |
| 96490 | 1998 KQ_{7} | — | May 23, 1998 | Anderson Mesa | LONEOS | · | 3.4 km | MPC · JPL |
| 96491 | 1998 KX_{7} | — | May 23, 1998 | Anderson Mesa | LONEOS | ADE | 5.5 km | MPC · JPL |
| 96492 | 1998 KL_{9} | — | May 28, 1998 | Prescott | P. G. Comba | · | 4.1 km | MPC · JPL |
| 96493 | 1998 KN_{10} | — | May 19, 1998 | Kitt Peak | Spacewatch | · | 3.5 km | MPC · JPL |
| 96494 | 1998 KE_{24} | — | May 22, 1998 | Socorro | LINEAR | · | 4.1 km | MPC · JPL |
| 96495 | 1998 KH_{28} | — | May 22, 1998 | Socorro | LINEAR | · | 2.1 km | MPC · JPL |
| 96496 | 1998 KT_{33} | — | May 22, 1998 | Socorro | LINEAR | · | 2.6 km | MPC · JPL |
| 96497 | 1998 KD_{37} | — | May 22, 1998 | Socorro | LINEAR | NYS | 2.0 km | MPC · JPL |
| 96498 | 1998 KJ_{40} | — | May 22, 1998 | Socorro | LINEAR | MAR | 2.6 km | MPC · JPL |
| 96499 | 1998 KE_{55} | — | May 23, 1998 | Socorro | LINEAR | · | 3.7 km | MPC · JPL |
| 96500 | 1998 KN_{57} | — | May 22, 1998 | Socorro | LINEAR | · | 3.5 km | MPC · JPL |

== 96501–96600 ==
back to top

| Designation | | | Discovery | | | Properties | | Ref |
| Permanent | Provisional | Named after | Date | Site | Discoverer(s) | Category | Diam. | Ref |
|---|---|---|---|---|---|---|---|---|
| 96501 | 1998 KU_{57} | — | May 22, 1998 | Socorro | LINEAR | · | 2.6 km | MPC · JPL |
| 96502 | 1998 KU_{58} | — | May 23, 1998 | Socorro | LINEAR | (194) | 2.6 km | MPC · JPL |
| 96503 | 1998 MC_{3} | — | June 16, 1998 | Kitt Peak | Spacewatch | (5) | 2.0 km | MPC · JPL |
| 96504 | 1998 ML_{15} | — | June 20, 1998 | Kitt Peak | Spacewatch | · | 2.5 km | MPC · JPL |
| 96505 | 1998 MH_{20} | — | June 24, 1998 | Socorro | LINEAR | · | 2.6 km | MPC · JPL |
| 96506 Oberösterreich | 1998 OR_{4} | Oberösterreich | July 26, 1998 | Linz | E. Meyer | · | 4.0 km | MPC · JPL |
| 96507 | 1998 QX_{1} | — | August 19, 1998 | Haleakala | NEAT | · | 7.6 km | MPC · JPL |
| 96508 | 1998 QJ_{30} | — | August 26, 1998 | Xinglong | SCAP | · | 3.4 km | MPC · JPL |
| 96509 | 1998 QE_{41} | — | August 17, 1998 | Socorro | LINEAR | HYG | 5.8 km | MPC · JPL |
| 96510 | 1998 QL_{55} | — | August 26, 1998 | Caussols | ODAS | THM | 5.4 km | MPC · JPL |
| 96511 | 1998 QG_{57} | — | August 30, 1998 | Kitt Peak | Spacewatch | (5) | 2.1 km | MPC · JPL |
| 96512 | 1998 QE_{67} | — | August 24, 1998 | Socorro | LINEAR | · | 5.8 km | MPC · JPL |
| 96513 | 1998 QW_{83} | — | August 24, 1998 | Socorro | LINEAR | INA | 7.1 km | MPC · JPL |
| 96514 | 1998 QC_{84} | — | August 24, 1998 | Socorro | LINEAR | · | 4.1 km | MPC · JPL |
| 96515 | 1998 QT_{85} | — | August 24, 1998 | Socorro | LINEAR | · | 5.7 km | MPC · JPL |
| 96516 | 1998 QU_{95} | — | August 19, 1998 | Socorro | LINEAR | · | 6.4 km | MPC · JPL |
| 96517 | 1998 QG_{99} | — | August 26, 1998 | La Silla | E. W. Elst | · | 6.1 km | MPC · JPL |
| 96518 | 1998 RO_{3} | — | September 14, 1998 | Socorro | LINEAR | H | 1.3 km | MPC · JPL |
| 96519 | 1998 RB_{5} | — | September 10, 1998 | Višnjan Observatory | Višnjan | · | 5.5 km | MPC · JPL |
| 96520 | 1998 RH_{6} | — | September 14, 1998 | Anderson Mesa | LONEOS | THM | 4.6 km | MPC · JPL |
| 96521 | 1998 RF_{9} | — | September 13, 1998 | Kitt Peak | Spacewatch | · | 3.5 km | MPC · JPL |
| 96522 | 1998 RK_{23} | — | September 14, 1998 | Socorro | LINEAR | THM | 4.9 km | MPC · JPL |
| 96523 | 1998 RC_{26} | — | September 14, 1998 | Socorro | LINEAR | · | 4.7 km | MPC · JPL |
| 96524 | 1998 RY_{28} | — | September 14, 1998 | Socorro | LINEAR | · | 4.1 km | MPC · JPL |
| 96525 | 1998 RE_{37} | — | September 14, 1998 | Socorro | LINEAR | · | 5.1 km | MPC · JPL |
| 96526 | 1998 RU_{40} | — | September 14, 1998 | Socorro | LINEAR | · | 5.8 km | MPC · JPL |
| 96527 | 1998 RQ_{45} | — | September 14, 1998 | Socorro | LINEAR | EUP | 7.0 km | MPC · JPL |
| 96528 | 1998 RP_{49} | — | September 14, 1998 | Socorro | LINEAR | THM | 4.6 km | MPC · JPL |
| 96529 | 1998 RR_{49} | — | September 14, 1998 | Socorro | LINEAR | KOR | 3.5 km | MPC · JPL |
| 96530 | 1998 RE_{54} | — | September 14, 1998 | Socorro | LINEAR | ADE | 7.3 km | MPC · JPL |
| 96531 | 1998 RL_{68} | — | September 14, 1998 | Socorro | LINEAR | · | 3.9 km | MPC · JPL |
| 96532 | 1998 RH_{69} | — | September 14, 1998 | Socorro | LINEAR | · | 5.3 km | MPC · JPL |
| 96533 | 1998 RH_{72} | — | September 14, 1998 | Socorro | LINEAR | · | 4.8 km | MPC · JPL |
| 96534 | 1998 RO_{79} | — | September 14, 1998 | Socorro | LINEAR | · | 4.6 km | MPC · JPL |
| 96535 Schiehallion | 1998 SC_{5} | Schiehallion | September 20, 1998 | Catalina | CSS | H | 1.2 km | MPC · JPL |
| 96536 | 1998 SO_{10} | — | September 19, 1998 | Anderson Mesa | LONEOS | T_{j} (2.89) · APO +1km | 3.0 km | MPC · JPL |
| 96537 | 1998 SF_{12} | — | September 22, 1998 | Caussols | ODAS | · | 3.0 km | MPC · JPL |
| 96538 | 1998 SN_{24} | — | September 17, 1998 | Anderson Mesa | LONEOS | · | 3.9 km | MPC · JPL |
| 96539 | 1998 SW_{27} | — | September 24, 1998 | Goodricke-Pigott | R. A. Tucker | TIR · | 6.1 km | MPC · JPL |
| 96540 | 1998 SC_{29} | — | September 18, 1998 | Kitt Peak | Spacewatch | · | 5.6 km | MPC · JPL |
| 96541 | 1998 SR_{31} | — | September 20, 1998 | Kitt Peak | Spacewatch | · | 4.6 km | MPC · JPL |
| 96542 | 1998 SA_{44} | — | September 21, 1998 | Kitt Peak | Spacewatch | · | 5.4 km | MPC · JPL |
| 96543 | 1998 SE_{48} | — | September 27, 1998 | Kitt Peak | Spacewatch | · | 4.3 km | MPC · JPL |
| 96544 | 1998 SK_{52} | — | September 28, 1998 | Kitt Peak | Spacewatch | THM | 5.5 km | MPC · JPL |
| 96545 | 1998 SQ_{53} | — | September 16, 1998 | Anderson Mesa | LONEOS | · | 6.3 km | MPC · JPL |
| 96546 | 1998 SO_{55} | — | September 16, 1998 | Anderson Mesa | LONEOS | · | 4.4 km | MPC · JPL |
| 96547 | 1998 SB_{57} | — | September 17, 1998 | Anderson Mesa | LONEOS | · | 5.6 km | MPC · JPL |
| 96548 | 1998 SX_{59} | — | September 17, 1998 | Anderson Mesa | LONEOS | · | 6.4 km | MPC · JPL |
| 96549 | 1998 SE_{63} | — | September 26, 1998 | Xinglong | SCAP | VER | 5.4 km | MPC · JPL |
| 96550 | 1998 SH_{68} | — | September 19, 1998 | Socorro | LINEAR | BRA | 2.8 km | MPC · JPL |
| 96551 | 1998 SL_{100} | — | September 26, 1998 | Socorro | LINEAR | · | 5.3 km | MPC · JPL |
| 96552 | 1998 SE_{113} | — | September 26, 1998 | Socorro | LINEAR | · | 4.9 km | MPC · JPL |
| 96553 | 1998 SS_{114} | — | September 26, 1998 | Socorro | LINEAR | KOR | 3.3 km | MPC · JPL |
| 96554 | 1998 SD_{119} | — | September 26, 1998 | Socorro | LINEAR | · | 11 km | MPC · JPL |
| 96555 | 1998 SN_{121} | — | September 26, 1998 | Socorro | LINEAR | HYG | 6.3 km | MPC · JPL |
| 96556 | 1998 ST_{126} | — | September 26, 1998 | Socorro | LINEAR | · | 4.3 km | MPC · JPL |
| 96557 | 1998 SC_{127} | — | September 26, 1998 | Socorro | LINEAR | HYG | 6.0 km | MPC · JPL |
| 96558 | 1998 SP_{127} | — | September 26, 1998 | Socorro | LINEAR | · | 2.4 km | MPC · JPL |
| 96559 | 1998 SF_{129} | — | September 26, 1998 | Socorro | LINEAR | · | 7.2 km | MPC · JPL |
| 96560 | 1998 SF_{133} | — | September 26, 1998 | Socorro | LINEAR | · | 5.2 km | MPC · JPL |
| 96561 | 1998 SB_{135} | — | September 26, 1998 | Socorro | LINEAR | · | 6.1 km | MPC · JPL |
| 96562 | 1998 SZ_{138} | — | September 26, 1998 | Socorro | LINEAR | · | 3.0 km | MPC · JPL |
| 96563 | 1998 SB_{154} | — | September 26, 1998 | Socorro | LINEAR | AGN | 4.6 km | MPC · JPL |
| 96564 | 1998 SN_{156} | — | September 26, 1998 | Socorro | LINEAR | · | 4.3 km | MPC · JPL |
| 96565 | 1998 SB_{157} | — | September 26, 1998 | Socorro | LINEAR | AGN | 2.4 km | MPC · JPL |
| 96566 | 1998 TC_{2} | — | October 12, 1998 | Caussols | ODAS | HYG | 6.1 km | MPC · JPL |
| 96567 | 1998 TE_{18} | — | October 13, 1998 | Xinglong | SCAP | · | 3.6 km | MPC · JPL |
| 96568 | 1998 TS_{19} | — | October 15, 1998 | Xinglong | SCAP | · | 5.3 km | MPC · JPL |
| 96569 | 1998 TO_{31} | — | October 11, 1998 | Anderson Mesa | LONEOS | · | 5.5 km | MPC · JPL |
| 96570 | 1998 TJ_{32} | — | October 11, 1998 | Anderson Mesa | LONEOS | HYG | 6.0 km | MPC · JPL |
| 96571 | 1998 UN_{11} | — | October 17, 1998 | Kitt Peak | Spacewatch | · | 4.7 km | MPC · JPL |
| 96572 | 1998 UN_{16} | — | October 23, 1998 | Višnjan Observatory | K. Korlević | · | 9.8 km | MPC · JPL |
| 96573 | 1998 UJ_{19} | — | October 28, 1998 | Socorro | LINEAR | H | 1.5 km | MPC · JPL |
| 96574 | 1998 UJ_{23} | — | October 30, 1998 | Goodricke-Pigott | R. A. Tucker | TIR | 3.4 km | MPC · JPL |
| 96575 | 1998 UY_{28} | — | October 18, 1998 | La Silla | E. W. Elst | HYG | 6.0 km | MPC · JPL |
| 96576 | 1998 UH_{35} | — | October 28, 1998 | Socorro | LINEAR | · | 7.0 km | MPC · JPL |
| 96577 | 1998 UC_{42} | — | October 28, 1998 | Socorro | LINEAR | · | 4.2 km | MPC · JPL |
| 96578 | 1998 VT_{2} | — | November 10, 1998 | Caussols | ODAS | KOR | 3.2 km | MPC · JPL |
| 96579 | 1998 VP_{7} | — | November 10, 1998 | Socorro | LINEAR | · | 4.1 km | MPC · JPL |
| 96580 | 1998 VY_{8} | — | November 10, 1998 | Socorro | LINEAR | AEG | 7.3 km | MPC · JPL |
| 96581 | 1998 VJ_{16} | — | November 10, 1998 | Socorro | LINEAR | · | 7.7 km | MPC · JPL |
| 96582 | 1998 VF_{25} | — | November 10, 1998 | Socorro | LINEAR | · | 6.1 km | MPC · JPL |
| 96583 | 1998 VG_{34} | — | November 15, 1998 | Sormano | P. Sicoli, F. Manca | · | 7.3 km | MPC · JPL |
| 96584 | 1998 VG_{53} | — | November 14, 1998 | Socorro | LINEAR | · | 2.8 km | MPC · JPL |
| 96585 | 1998 WY_{2} | — | November 17, 1998 | Caussols | ODAS | · | 5.3 km | MPC · JPL |
| 96586 | 1998 WE_{14} | — | November 21, 1998 | Socorro | LINEAR | THM | 4.7 km | MPC · JPL |
| 96587 | 1998 WK_{15} | — | November 21, 1998 | Socorro | LINEAR | · | 4.7 km | MPC · JPL |
| 96588 | 1998 WR_{20} | — | November 18, 1998 | Socorro | LINEAR | LIX | 9.3 km | MPC · JPL |
| 96589 | 1998 WW_{22} | — | November 18, 1998 | Socorro | LINEAR | THM | 5.7 km | MPC · JPL |
| 96590 | 1998 XB | — | December 1, 1998 | Xinglong | SCAP | ATE +1km · slow | 880 m | MPC · JPL |
| 96591 Emiliemartin | 1998 XY | Emiliemartin | December 7, 1998 | Caussols | ODAS | THM | 5.9 km | MPC · JPL |
| 96592 | 1998 XC_{1} | — | December 7, 1998 | Caussols | ODAS | · | 5.7 km | MPC · JPL |
| 96593 | 1998 XO_{20} | — | December 10, 1998 | Kitt Peak | Spacewatch | LIX | 8.7 km | MPC · JPL |
| 96594 | 1998 XA_{22} | — | December 10, 1998 | Kitt Peak | Spacewatch | · | 7.3 km | MPC · JPL |
| 96595 | 1998 XQ_{23} | — | December 11, 1998 | Kitt Peak | Spacewatch | HYG | 5.4 km | MPC · JPL |
| 96596 | 1998 XW_{26} | — | December 14, 1998 | Socorro | LINEAR | H · | 1.9 km | MPC · JPL |
| 96597 | 1998 XU_{28} | — | December 14, 1998 | Socorro | LINEAR | THM | 5.6 km | MPC · JPL |
| 96598 | 1998 XS_{41} | — | December 14, 1998 | Socorro | LINEAR | · | 5.7 km | MPC · JPL |
| 96599 | 1998 XP_{49} | — | December 14, 1998 | Socorro | LINEAR | · | 3.8 km | MPC · JPL |
| 96600 | 1998 XH_{74} | — | December 14, 1998 | Socorro | LINEAR | · | 3.8 km | MPC · JPL |

== 96601–96700 ==
back to top

| Designation | | | Discovery | | | Properties | | Ref |
| Permanent | Provisional | Named after | Date | Site | Discoverer(s) | Category | Diam. | Ref |
|---|---|---|---|---|---|---|---|---|
| 96601 | 1998 XD_{78} | — | December 15, 1998 | Socorro | LINEAR | · | 4.7 km | MPC · JPL |
| 96602 | 1998 YF_{9} | — | December 23, 1998 | Xinglong | SCAP | · | 5.3 km | MPC · JPL |
| 96603 | 1998 YH_{12} | — | December 20, 1998 | Ondřejov | Kolar, A., L. Kotková | · | 7.3 km | MPC · JPL |
| 96604 | 1998 YG_{19} | — | December 25, 1998 | Kitt Peak | Spacewatch | HYG | 7.3 km | MPC · JPL |
| 96605 | 1999 AS_{10} | — | January 7, 1999 | Kitt Peak | Spacewatch | KOR | 3.2 km | MPC · JPL |
| 96606 | 1999 AH_{13} | — | January 7, 1999 | Kitt Peak | Spacewatch | · | 5.0 km | MPC · JPL |
| 96607 | 1999 AT_{30} | — | January 14, 1999 | Kitt Peak | Spacewatch | CYB | 8.1 km | MPC · JPL |
| 96608 | 1999 AO_{34} | — | January 15, 1999 | Anderson Mesa | LONEOS | · | 12 km | MPC · JPL |
| 96609 | 1999 AQ_{35} | — | January 9, 1999 | Mérida | Naranjo, O. A. | HIL · 3:2 | 11 km | MPC · JPL |
| 96610 | 1999 BZ_{18} | — | January 16, 1999 | Socorro | LINEAR | · | 8.7 km | MPC · JPL |
| 96611 | 1999 BJ_{29} | — | January 18, 1999 | Kitt Peak | Spacewatch | · | 1.6 km | MPC · JPL |
| 96612 Litipei | 1999 CZ_{3} | Litipei | February 5, 1999 | Xinglong | SCAP | · | 2.1 km | MPC · JPL |
| 96613 | 1999 CG_{5} | — | February 12, 1999 | Gekko | T. Kagawa | · | 1.9 km | MPC · JPL |
| 96614 | 1999 CL_{16} | — | February 6, 1999 | Višnjan Observatory | K. Korlević | T_{j} (2.99) | 9.2 km | MPC · JPL |
| 96615 | 1999 CZ_{17} | — | February 10, 1999 | Socorro | LINEAR | · | 9.5 km | MPC · JPL |
| 96616 | 1999 CG_{20} | — | February 10, 1999 | Socorro | LINEAR | · | 4.3 km | MPC · JPL |
| 96617 | 1999 CC_{32} | — | February 10, 1999 | Socorro | LINEAR | · | 3.1 km | MPC · JPL |
| 96618 | 1999 CL_{102} | — | February 10, 1999 | Socorro | LINEAR | · | 1.9 km | MPC · JPL |
| 96619 | 1999 CA_{115} | — | February 12, 1999 | Socorro | LINEAR | · | 1.8 km | MPC · JPL |
| 96620 | 1999 CG_{116} | — | February 12, 1999 | Socorro | LINEAR | · | 4.1 km | MPC · JPL |
| 96621 | 1999 CV_{120} | — | February 11, 1999 | Socorro | LINEAR | · | 6.4 km | MPC · JPL |
| 96622 | 1999 DY | — | February 18, 1999 | Višnjan Observatory | K. Korlević | V | 1.7 km | MPC · JPL |
| 96623 Leani | 1999 ET_{4} | Leani | March 14, 1999 | Monte Agliale | Santangelo, M. M. M. | · | 2.4 km | MPC · JPL |
| 96624 | 1999 EZ_{5} | — | March 12, 1999 | Kitt Peak | Spacewatch | · | 2.3 km | MPC · JPL |
| 96625 | 1999 FY_{1} | — | March 16, 1999 | Kitt Peak | Spacewatch | MAS | 1.4 km | MPC · JPL |
| 96626 | 1999 FQ_{9} | — | March 22, 1999 | Anderson Mesa | LONEOS | · | 2.1 km | MPC · JPL |
| 96627 | 1999 FW_{26} | — | March 19, 1999 | Socorro | LINEAR | · | 1.8 km | MPC · JPL |
| 96628 | 1999 FW_{27} | — | March 19, 1999 | Socorro | LINEAR | · | 3.3 km | MPC · JPL |
| 96629 | 1999 FA_{29} | — | March 19, 1999 | Socorro | LINEAR | · | 2.9 km | MPC · JPL |
| 96630 | 1999 FY_{30} | — | March 19, 1999 | Socorro | LINEAR | · | 3.4 km | MPC · JPL |
| 96631 | 1999 FP_{59} | — | March 23, 1999 | Kitt Peak | Spacewatch | AMO +1km | 830 m | MPC · JPL |
| 96632 | 1999 GE_{1} | — | April 6, 1999 | Fountain Hills | C. W. Juels | · | 5.9 km | MPC · JPL |
| 96633 | 1999 GZ_{1} | — | April 7, 1999 | Socorro | LINEAR | · | 4.1 km | MPC · JPL |
| 96634 | 1999 GF_{2} | — | April 9, 1999 | Prescott | P. G. Comba | V | 1.8 km | MPC · JPL |
| 96635 | 1999 GR_{4} | — | April 10, 1999 | Višnjan Observatory | K. Korlević | V | 2.1 km | MPC · JPL |
| 96636 | 1999 GG_{7} | — | April 6, 1999 | Anderson Mesa | LONEOS | · | 2.2 km | MPC · JPL |
| 96637 | 1999 GQ_{7} | — | April 7, 1999 | Anderson Mesa | LONEOS | · | 4.0 km | MPC · JPL |
| 96638 | 1999 GZ_{8} | — | April 10, 1999 | Anderson Mesa | LONEOS | · | 1.7 km | MPC · JPL |
| 96639 | 1999 GJ_{9} | — | April 11, 1999 | Anderson Mesa | LONEOS | · | 2.3 km | MPC · JPL |
| 96640 | 1999 GT_{18} | — | April 15, 1999 | Socorro | LINEAR | · | 2.3 km | MPC · JPL |
| 96641 | 1999 GG_{22} | — | April 6, 1999 | Socorro | LINEAR | · | 1.9 km | MPC · JPL |
| 96642 | 1999 GN_{25} | — | April 6, 1999 | Socorro | LINEAR | (2076) | 2.4 km | MPC · JPL |
| 96643 | 1999 GY_{26} | — | April 7, 1999 | Socorro | LINEAR | · | 2.5 km | MPC · JPL |
| 96644 | 1999 GX_{30} | — | April 7, 1999 | Socorro | LINEAR | · | 1.6 km | MPC · JPL |
| 96645 | 1999 GB_{35} | — | April 6, 1999 | Socorro | LINEAR | NYS | 2.3 km | MPC · JPL |
| 96646 | 1999 GR_{35} | — | April 7, 1999 | Socorro | LINEAR | NYS · | 5.1 km | MPC · JPL |
| 96647 | 1999 GX_{35} | — | April 7, 1999 | Socorro | LINEAR | (1338) (FLO) | 1.2 km | MPC · JPL |
| 96648 | 1999 GZ_{45} | — | April 12, 1999 | Socorro | LINEAR | · | 1.7 km | MPC · JPL |
| 96649 | 1999 GL_{59} | — | April 12, 1999 | Socorro | LINEAR | V | 1.2 km | MPC · JPL |
| 96650 | 1999 GX_{60} | — | April 15, 1999 | Socorro | LINEAR | · | 1.9 km | MPC · JPL |
| 96651 | 1999 GT_{62} | — | April 12, 1999 | Socorro | LINEAR | · | 2.4 km | MPC · JPL |
| 96652 | 1999 HA | — | April 16, 1999 | Prescott | P. G. Comba | · | 1.5 km | MPC · JPL |
| 96653 | 1999 HG_{9} | — | April 17, 1999 | Socorro | LINEAR | · | 2.6 km | MPC · JPL |
| 96654 | 1999 JM_{1} | — | May 8, 1999 | Catalina | CSS | NYS | 1.6 km | MPC · JPL |
| 96655 | 1999 JD_{2} | — | May 8, 1999 | Catalina | CSS | · | 1.7 km | MPC · JPL |
| 96656 | 1999 JJ_{2} | — | May 8, 1999 | Catalina | CSS | · | 1.6 km | MPC · JPL |
| 96657 | 1999 JY_{5} | — | May 12, 1999 | Socorro | LINEAR | PHO | 3.1 km | MPC · JPL |
| 96658 | 1999 JC_{6} | — | May 10, 1999 | Socorro | LINEAR | · | 2.1 km | MPC · JPL |
| 96659 | 1999 JO_{7} | — | May 8, 1999 | Catalina | CSS | · | 2.7 km | MPC · JPL |
| 96660 | 1999 JN_{9} | — | May 8, 1999 | Catalina | CSS | · | 3.3 km | MPC · JPL |
| 96661 | 1999 JT_{12} | — | May 14, 1999 | Catalina | CSS | · | 5.4 km | MPC · JPL |
| 96662 | 1999 JT_{13} | — | May 10, 1999 | Socorro | LINEAR | · | 1.3 km | MPC · JPL |
| 96663 | 1999 JZ_{14} | — | May 12, 1999 | Socorro | LINEAR | · | 1.6 km | MPC · JPL |
| 96664 | 1999 JG_{15} | — | May 15, 1999 | Catalina | CSS | V | 2.1 km | MPC · JPL |
| 96665 | 1999 JL_{22} | — | May 10, 1999 | Socorro | LINEAR | · | 2.2 km | MPC · JPL |
| 96666 | 1999 JH_{23} | — | May 10, 1999 | Socorro | LINEAR | · | 4.2 km | MPC · JPL |
| 96667 | 1999 JJ_{23} | — | May 10, 1999 | Socorro | LINEAR | · | 2.3 km | MPC · JPL |
| 96668 | 1999 JH_{24} | — | May 10, 1999 | Socorro | LINEAR | · | 4.1 km | MPC · JPL |
| 96669 | 1999 JS_{31} | — | May 10, 1999 | Socorro | LINEAR | MAS | 1.6 km | MPC · JPL |
| 96670 | 1999 JM_{32} | — | May 10, 1999 | Socorro | LINEAR | NYS · | 4.7 km | MPC · JPL |
| 96671 | 1999 JD_{33} | — | May 10, 1999 | Socorro | LINEAR | V | 1.6 km | MPC · JPL |
| 96672 | 1999 JG_{36} | — | May 10, 1999 | Socorro | LINEAR | V | 5.2 km | MPC · JPL |
| 96673 | 1999 JO_{37} | — | May 10, 1999 | Socorro | LINEAR | NYS | 2.9 km | MPC · JPL |
| 96674 | 1999 JQ_{37} | — | May 10, 1999 | Socorro | LINEAR | · | 2.0 km | MPC · JPL |
| 96675 | 1999 JJ_{40} | — | May 10, 1999 | Socorro | LINEAR | NYS | 1.6 km | MPC · JPL |
| 96676 | 1999 JL_{40} | — | May 10, 1999 | Socorro | LINEAR | MAS | 2.6 km | MPC · JPL |
| 96677 | 1999 JR_{40} | — | May 10, 1999 | Socorro | LINEAR | · | 2.6 km | MPC · JPL |
| 96678 | 1999 JO_{41} | — | May 10, 1999 | Socorro | LINEAR | · | 2.2 km | MPC · JPL |
| 96679 | 1999 JW_{42} | — | May 10, 1999 | Socorro | LINEAR | · | 1.9 km | MPC · JPL |
| 96680 | 1999 JG_{43} | — | May 10, 1999 | Socorro | LINEAR | V | 2.0 km | MPC · JPL |
| 96681 | 1999 JZ_{46} | — | May 10, 1999 | Socorro | LINEAR | · | 3.1 km | MPC · JPL |
| 96682 | 1999 JQ_{48} | — | May 10, 1999 | Socorro | LINEAR | NYS | 2.7 km | MPC · JPL |
| 96683 | 1999 JO_{49} | — | May 10, 1999 | Socorro | LINEAR | · | 5.3 km | MPC · JPL |
| 96684 | 1999 JK_{50} | — | May 10, 1999 | Socorro | LINEAR | · | 2.6 km | MPC · JPL |
| 96685 | 1999 JQ_{50} | — | May 10, 1999 | Socorro | LINEAR | · | 1.5 km | MPC · JPL |
| 96686 | 1999 JP_{53} | — | May 10, 1999 | Socorro | LINEAR | V | 2.2 km | MPC · JPL |
| 96687 | 1999 JO_{64} | — | May 10, 1999 | Socorro | LINEAR | MAS | 1.9 km | MPC · JPL |
| 96688 | 1999 JY_{70} | — | May 12, 1999 | Socorro | LINEAR | V | 1.4 km | MPC · JPL |
| 96689 | 1999 JW_{71} | — | May 12, 1999 | Socorro | LINEAR | (2076) | 1.9 km | MPC · JPL |
| 96690 | 1999 JA_{73} | — | May 12, 1999 | Socorro | LINEAR | SUL | 3.9 km | MPC · JPL |
| 96691 | 1999 JH_{73} | — | May 12, 1999 | Socorro | LINEAR | · | 3.5 km | MPC · JPL |
| 96692 | 1999 JJ_{73} | — | May 12, 1999 | Socorro | LINEAR | · | 1.2 km | MPC · JPL |
| 96693 | 1999 JO_{74} | — | May 12, 1999 | Socorro | LINEAR | · | 3.4 km | MPC · JPL |
| 96694 | 1999 JY_{74} | — | May 12, 1999 | Socorro | LINEAR | · | 2.7 km | MPC · JPL |
| 96695 | 1999 JJ_{76} | — | May 10, 1999 | Socorro | LINEAR | V | 2.3 km | MPC · JPL |
| 96696 | 1999 JG_{79} | — | May 13, 1999 | Socorro | LINEAR | PHO | 2.2 km | MPC · JPL |
| 96697 | 1999 JM_{79} | — | May 13, 1999 | Socorro | LINEAR | · | 3.1 km | MPC · JPL |
| 96698 | 1999 JA_{80} | — | May 13, 1999 | Socorro | LINEAR | V | 1.8 km | MPC · JPL |
| 96699 | 1999 JM_{93} | — | May 12, 1999 | Socorro | LINEAR | · | 1.3 km | MPC · JPL |
| 96700 | 1999 JP_{93} | — | May 12, 1999 | Socorro | LINEAR | · | 3.3 km | MPC · JPL |

== 96701–96800 ==
back to top

| Designation | | | Discovery | | | Properties | | Ref |
| Permanent | Provisional | Named after | Date | Site | Discoverer(s) | Category | Diam. | Ref |
|---|---|---|---|---|---|---|---|---|
| 96701 | 1999 JG_{105} | — | May 12, 1999 | Socorro | LINEAR | · | 2.3 km | MPC · JPL |
| 96702 | 1999 JT_{107} | — | May 13, 1999 | Socorro | LINEAR | · | 1.9 km | MPC · JPL |
| 96703 | 1999 JO_{111} | — | May 13, 1999 | Socorro | LINEAR | · | 2.7 km | MPC · JPL |
| 96704 | 1999 JQ_{111} | — | May 13, 1999 | Socorro | LINEAR | · | 1.7 km | MPC · JPL |
| 96705 | 1999 JB_{117} | — | May 13, 1999 | Socorro | LINEAR | NYS · | 3.8 km | MPC · JPL |
| 96706 | 1999 JE_{119} | — | May 13, 1999 | Socorro | LINEAR | MAS | 2.1 km | MPC · JPL |
| 96707 | 1999 JQ_{119} | — | May 13, 1999 | Socorro | LINEAR | V | 1.4 km | MPC · JPL |
| 96708 | 1999 JU_{126} | — | May 13, 1999 | Socorro | LINEAR | NYS · | 3.9 km | MPC · JPL |
| 96709 | 1999 JK_{127} | — | May 13, 1999 | Socorro | LINEAR | · | 2.9 km | MPC · JPL |
| 96710 | 1999 JN_{135} | — | May 12, 1999 | Socorro | LINEAR | · | 1.4 km | MPC · JPL |
| 96711 | 1999 JE_{138} | — | May 8, 1999 | Catalina | CSS | · | 4.3 km | MPC · JPL |
| 96712 | 1999 KH_{4} | — | May 20, 1999 | Oaxaca | Roe, J. M. | · | 1.5 km | MPC · JPL |
| 96713 | 1999 KG_{5} | — | May 18, 1999 | Kitt Peak | Spacewatch | NYS · | 2.1 km | MPC · JPL |
| 96714 | 1999 KH_{6} | — | May 22, 1999 | Kitt Peak | Spacewatch | V | 1.6 km | MPC · JPL |
| 96715 | 1999 KR_{7} | — | May 18, 1999 | Socorro | LINEAR | · | 1.7 km | MPC · JPL |
| 96716 | 1999 KD_{9} | — | May 18, 1999 | Socorro | LINEAR | · | 3.1 km | MPC · JPL |
| 96717 | 1999 KG_{9} | — | May 18, 1999 | Socorro | LINEAR | NYS | 2.1 km | MPC · JPL |
| 96718 | 1999 KU_{11} | — | May 18, 1999 | Socorro | LINEAR | NYS | 1.9 km | MPC · JPL |
| 96719 | 1999 KO_{17} | — | May 17, 1999 | Anderson Mesa | LONEOS | · | 4.8 km | MPC · JPL |
| 96720 | 1999 LP | — | June 4, 1999 | Socorro | LINEAR | · | 3.0 km | MPC · JPL |
| 96721 | 1999 LT | — | June 7, 1999 | Catalina | CSS | H | 1.2 km | MPC · JPL |
| 96722 | 1999 LO_{4} | — | June 10, 1999 | Woomera | F. B. Zoltowski | · | 2.0 km | MPC · JPL |
| 96723 | 1999 LB_{16} | — | June 12, 1999 | Socorro | LINEAR | EUN | 2.3 km | MPC · JPL |
| 96724 | 1999 LY_{20} | — | June 9, 1999 | Socorro | LINEAR | · | 3.1 km | MPC · JPL |
| 96725 | 1999 LA_{30} | — | June 12, 1999 | Kitt Peak | Spacewatch | · | 2.0 km | MPC · JPL |
| 96726 | 1999 LA_{31} | — | June 13, 1999 | Kitt Peak | Spacewatch | · | 2.4 km | MPC · JPL |
| 96727 | 1999 LK_{31} | — | June 12, 1999 | Socorro | LINEAR | PHO | 2.5 km | MPC · JPL |
| 96728 | 1999 NF_{7} | — | July 13, 1999 | Socorro | LINEAR | · | 3.8 km | MPC · JPL |
| 96729 | 1999 NL_{21} | — | July 14, 1999 | Socorro | LINEAR | · | 2.9 km | MPC · JPL |
| 96730 | 1999 NL_{23} | — | July 14, 1999 | Socorro | LINEAR | · | 3.4 km | MPC · JPL |
| 96731 | 1999 NP_{27} | — | July 14, 1999 | Socorro | LINEAR | · | 2.6 km | MPC · JPL |
| 96732 | 1999 NQ_{27} | — | July 14, 1999 | Socorro | LINEAR | · | 3.0 km | MPC · JPL |
| 96733 | 1999 NO_{28} | — | July 14, 1999 | Socorro | LINEAR | · | 1.8 km | MPC · JPL |
| 96734 | 1999 NR_{42} | — | July 14, 1999 | Socorro | LINEAR | · | 2.2 km | MPC · JPL |
| 96735 | 1999 NV_{43} | — | July 13, 1999 | Socorro | LINEAR | · | 6.3 km | MPC · JPL |
| 96736 | 1999 NA_{48} | — | July 13, 1999 | Socorro | LINEAR | · | 4.6 km | MPC · JPL |
| 96737 | 1999 NJ_{48} | — | July 13, 1999 | Socorro | LINEAR | ADE | 5.2 km | MPC · JPL |
| 96738 | 1999 NQ_{55} | — | July 12, 1999 | Socorro | LINEAR | EUN | 2.9 km | MPC · JPL |
| 96739 | 1999 NE_{56} | — | July 12, 1999 | Socorro | LINEAR | EUN | 2.9 km | MPC · JPL |
| 96740 | 1999 NW_{56} | — | July 12, 1999 | Socorro | LINEAR | EUN | 3.1 km | MPC · JPL |
| 96741 | 1999 NY_{59} | — | July 13, 1999 | Socorro | LINEAR | · | 3.4 km | MPC · JPL |
| 96742 | 1999 ON | — | July 17, 1999 | Reedy Creek | J. Broughton | · | 3.3 km | MPC · JPL |
| 96743 | 1999 OC_{3} | — | July 22, 1999 | Socorro | LINEAR | (194) | 4.2 km | MPC · JPL |
| 96744 | 1999 OW_{3} | — | July 18, 1999 | Mauna Kea | D. J. Tholen, Whiteley, R. J. | APO +1km | 3.9 km | MPC · JPL |
| 96745 | 1999 PB | — | August 2, 1999 | Gekko | T. Kagawa | · | 2.7 km | MPC · JPL |
| 96746 | 1999 PK_{8} | — | August 13, 1999 | Anderson Mesa | LONEOS | · | 2.4 km | MPC · JPL |
| 96747 Crespodasilva | 1999 QQ_{2} | Crespodasilva | August 16, 1999 | WAO | Crespo da Silva, L. | EUN | 3.4 km | MPC · JPL |
| 96748 | 1999 RE_{4} | — | September 5, 1999 | Catalina | CSS | EUN | 3.0 km | MPC · JPL |
| 96749 | 1999 RF_{4} | — | September 5, 1999 | Catalina | CSS | · | 2.0 km | MPC · JPL |
| 96750 | 1999 RK_{8} | — | September 4, 1999 | Kitt Peak | Spacewatch | · | 3.8 km | MPC · JPL |
| 96751 | 1999 RY_{12} | — | September 7, 1999 | Socorro | LINEAR | · | 3.6 km | MPC · JPL |
| 96752 | 1999 RO_{16} | — | September 7, 1999 | Socorro | LINEAR | · | 2.0 km | MPC · JPL |
| 96753 | 1999 RB_{17} | — | September 7, 1999 | Socorro | LINEAR | HNS | 2.2 km | MPC · JPL |
| 96754 | 1999 RF_{18} | — | September 7, 1999 | Socorro | LINEAR | (12739) | 3.3 km | MPC · JPL |
| 96755 | 1999 RJ_{19} | — | September 7, 1999 | Socorro | LINEAR | · | 3.0 km | MPC · JPL |
| 96756 | 1999 RD_{20} | — | September 7, 1999 | Socorro | LINEAR | ADE | 6.0 km | MPC · JPL |
| 96757 | 1999 RG_{20} | — | September 7, 1999 | Socorro | LINEAR | · | 2.3 km | MPC · JPL |
| 96758 | 1999 RM_{21} | — | September 7, 1999 | Socorro | LINEAR | NEM | 4.9 km | MPC · JPL |
| 96759 | 1999 RE_{22} | — | September 7, 1999 | Socorro | LINEAR | · | 2.6 km | MPC · JPL |
| 96760 | 1999 RL_{23} | — | September 7, 1999 | Socorro | LINEAR | · | 3.3 km | MPC · JPL |
| 96761 | 1999 RZ_{25} | — | September 7, 1999 | Socorro | LINEAR | · | 2.6 km | MPC · JPL |
| 96762 | 1999 RW_{28} | — | September 7, 1999 | Socorro | LINEAR | HNS | 2.9 km | MPC · JPL |
| 96763 | 1999 RG_{30} | — | September 8, 1999 | Socorro | LINEAR | HNS | 3.5 km | MPC · JPL |
| 96764 | 1999 RY_{32} | — | September 9, 1999 | Monte Agliale | S. Donati | · | 2.4 km | MPC · JPL |
| 96765 Poznańuni | 1999 RS_{34} | Poznańuni | September 10, 1999 | Ondřejov | P. Pravec, P. Kušnirák | · | 3.7 km | MPC · JPL |
| 96766 | 1999 RA_{35} | — | September 10, 1999 | Črni Vrh | Skvarč, J. | EUN | 2.5 km | MPC · JPL |
| 96767 | 1999 RP_{40} | — | September 7, 1999 | Socorro | LINEAR | HNS | 3.1 km | MPC · JPL |
| 96768 | 1999 RH_{50} | — | September 7, 1999 | Socorro | LINEAR | · | 4.3 km | MPC · JPL |
| 96769 | 1999 RC_{51} | — | September 7, 1999 | Socorro | LINEAR | · | 3.5 km | MPC · JPL |
| 96770 | 1999 RF_{54} | — | September 7, 1999 | Socorro | LINEAR | · | 4.2 km | MPC · JPL |
| 96771 | 1999 RP_{56} | — | September 7, 1999 | Socorro | LINEAR | · | 3.5 km | MPC · JPL |
| 96772 | 1999 RL_{57} | — | September 8, 1999 | Kitt Peak | Spacewatch | · | 2.3 km | MPC · JPL |
| 96773 | 1999 RJ_{60} | — | September 7, 1999 | Socorro | LINEAR | · | 3.0 km | MPC · JPL |
| 96774 | 1999 RG_{68} | — | September 7, 1999 | Socorro | LINEAR | · | 3.9 km | MPC · JPL |
| 96775 | 1999 RL_{73} | — | September 7, 1999 | Socorro | LINEAR | · | 3.4 km | MPC · JPL |
| 96776 | 1999 RM_{78} | — | September 7, 1999 | Socorro | LINEAR | · | 2.4 km | MPC · JPL |
| 96777 | 1999 RB_{80} | — | September 7, 1999 | Socorro | LINEAR | · | 2.0 km | MPC · JPL |
| 96778 | 1999 RT_{81} | — | September 7, 1999 | Socorro | LINEAR | · | 3.0 km | MPC · JPL |
| 96779 | 1999 RX_{82} | — | September 7, 1999 | Socorro | LINEAR | · | 3.3 km | MPC · JPL |
| 96780 | 1999 RE_{83} | — | September 7, 1999 | Socorro | LINEAR | NYS | 2.3 km | MPC · JPL |
| 96781 | 1999 RM_{86} | — | September 7, 1999 | Socorro | LINEAR | · | 2.0 km | MPC · JPL |
| 96782 | 1999 RM_{95} | — | September 7, 1999 | Socorro | LINEAR | · | 13 km | MPC · JPL |
| 96783 | 1999 RS_{97} | — | September 7, 1999 | Socorro | LINEAR | · | 2.8 km | MPC · JPL |
| 96784 | 1999 RP_{101} | — | September 8, 1999 | Socorro | LINEAR | · | 4.1 km | MPC · JPL |
| 96785 | 1999 RL_{102} | — | September 8, 1999 | Socorro | LINEAR | · | 3.7 km | MPC · JPL |
| 96786 | 1999 RN_{103} | — | September 8, 1999 | Socorro | LINEAR | EUN | 2.7 km | MPC · JPL |
| 96787 | 1999 RX_{104} | — | September 8, 1999 | Socorro | LINEAR | · | 3.0 km | MPC · JPL |
| 96788 | 1999 RU_{105} | — | September 8, 1999 | Socorro | LINEAR | MAR | 4.1 km | MPC · JPL |
| 96789 | 1999 RB_{107} | — | September 8, 1999 | Socorro | LINEAR | · | 3.9 km | MPC · JPL |
| 96790 | 1999 RW_{109} | — | September 8, 1999 | Socorro | LINEAR | · | 3.6 km | MPC · JPL |
| 96791 | 1999 RL_{110} | — | September 8, 1999 | Socorro | LINEAR | · | 3.3 km | MPC · JPL |
| 96792 | 1999 RO_{110} | — | September 8, 1999 | Socorro | LINEAR | ADE | 4.3 km | MPC · JPL |
| 96793 | 1999 RV_{110} | — | September 8, 1999 | Socorro | LINEAR | · | 5.2 km | MPC · JPL |
| 96794 | 1999 RP_{120} | — | September 9, 1999 | Socorro | LINEAR | · | 6.6 km | MPC · JPL |
| 96795 | 1999 RY_{123} | — | September 9, 1999 | Socorro | LINEAR | · | 6.4 km | MPC · JPL |
| 96796 | 1999 RQ_{124} | — | September 9, 1999 | Socorro | LINEAR | · | 3.7 km | MPC · JPL |
| 96797 | 1999 RT_{124} | — | September 9, 1999 | Socorro | LINEAR | · | 4.2 km | MPC · JPL |
| 96798 | 1999 RH_{127} | — | September 9, 1999 | Socorro | LINEAR | · | 2.1 km | MPC · JPL |
| 96799 | 1999 RQ_{127} | — | September 9, 1999 | Socorro | LINEAR | (5) | 2.7 km | MPC · JPL |
| 96800 | 1999 RY_{127} | — | September 9, 1999 | Socorro | LINEAR | · | 2.0 km | MPC · JPL |

== 96801–96900 ==
back to top

| Designation | | | Discovery | | | Properties | | Ref |
| Permanent | Provisional | Named after | Date | Site | Discoverer(s) | Category | Diam. | Ref |
|---|---|---|---|---|---|---|---|---|
| 96801 | 1999 RC_{131} | — | September 9, 1999 | Socorro | LINEAR | EUN | 2.9 km | MPC · JPL |
| 96802 | 1999 RC_{134} | — | September 9, 1999 | Socorro | LINEAR | · | 2.2 km | MPC · JPL |
| 96803 | 1999 RH_{134} | — | September 9, 1999 | Socorro | LINEAR | · | 3.4 km | MPC · JPL |
| 96804 | 1999 RD_{137} | — | September 9, 1999 | Socorro | LINEAR | · | 3.7 km | MPC · JPL |
| 96805 | 1999 RR_{138} | — | September 9, 1999 | Socorro | LINEAR | · | 2.9 km | MPC · JPL |
| 96806 | 1999 RU_{142} | — | September 9, 1999 | Socorro | LINEAR | · | 3.5 km | MPC · JPL |
| 96807 | 1999 RK_{143} | — | September 9, 1999 | Socorro | LINEAR | · | 2.1 km | MPC · JPL |
| 96808 | 1999 RS_{148} | — | September 9, 1999 | Socorro | LINEAR | · | 2.2 km | MPC · JPL |
| 96809 | 1999 RV_{150} | — | September 9, 1999 | Socorro | LINEAR | · | 2.7 km | MPC · JPL |
| 96810 | 1999 RZ_{156} | — | September 9, 1999 | Socorro | LINEAR | · | 3.5 km | MPC · JPL |
| 96811 | 1999 RM_{157} | — | September 9, 1999 | Socorro | LINEAR | · | 2.9 km | MPC · JPL |
| 96812 | 1999 RZ_{161} | — | September 9, 1999 | Socorro | LINEAR | · | 3.1 km | MPC · JPL |
| 96813 | 1999 RP_{163} | — | September 9, 1999 | Socorro | LINEAR | · | 2.9 km | MPC · JPL |
| 96814 | 1999 RS_{163} | — | September 9, 1999 | Socorro | LINEAR | · | 2.0 km | MPC · JPL |
| 96815 | 1999 RN_{164} | — | September 9, 1999 | Socorro | LINEAR | · | 2.3 km | MPC · JPL |
| 96816 | 1999 RZ_{164} | — | September 9, 1999 | Socorro | LINEAR | MAR | 3.1 km | MPC · JPL |
| 96817 | 1999 RK_{166} | — | September 9, 1999 | Socorro | LINEAR | V | 1.9 km | MPC · JPL |
| 96818 | 1999 RW_{171} | — | September 9, 1999 | Socorro | LINEAR | (5) | 2.3 km | MPC · JPL |
| 96819 | 1999 RS_{175} | — | September 9, 1999 | Socorro | LINEAR | · | 2.9 km | MPC · JPL |
| 96820 | 1999 RY_{176} | — | September 9, 1999 | Socorro | LINEAR | · | 2.1 km | MPC · JPL |
| 96821 | 1999 RU_{180} | — | September 9, 1999 | Socorro | LINEAR | NYS | 1.4 km | MPC · JPL |
| 96822 | 1999 RY_{180} | — | September 9, 1999 | Socorro | LINEAR | TIR | 5.7 km | MPC · JPL |
| 96823 | 1999 RK_{181} | — | September 9, 1999 | Socorro | LINEAR | · | 4.2 km | MPC · JPL |
| 96824 | 1999 RA_{182} | — | September 9, 1999 | Socorro | LINEAR | · | 2.9 km | MPC · JPL |
| 96825 | 1999 RA_{185} | — | September 9, 1999 | Socorro | LINEAR | · | 4.4 km | MPC · JPL |
| 96826 | 1999 RQ_{185} | — | September 9, 1999 | Socorro | LINEAR | (12739) | 3.2 km | MPC · JPL |
| 96827 | 1999 RE_{186} | — | September 9, 1999 | Socorro | LINEAR | · | 2.5 km | MPC · JPL |
| 96828 | 1999 RT_{187} | — | September 9, 1999 | Socorro | LINEAR | · | 2.2 km | MPC · JPL |
| 96829 | 1999 RW_{187} | — | September 9, 1999 | Socorro | LINEAR | · | 2.2 km | MPC · JPL |
| 96830 | 1999 RW_{189} | — | September 9, 1999 | Socorro | LINEAR | (5) | 2.0 km | MPC · JPL |
| 96831 | 1999 RU_{194} | — | September 8, 1999 | Socorro | LINEAR | · | 4.6 km | MPC · JPL |
| 96832 | 1999 RE_{195} | — | September 8, 1999 | Socorro | LINEAR | EUN | 2.9 km | MPC · JPL |
| 96833 | 1999 RL_{195} | — | September 8, 1999 | Socorro | LINEAR | · | 5.0 km | MPC · JPL |
| 96834 | 1999 RG_{199} | — | September 7, 1999 | Socorro | LINEAR | JUN | 2.7 km | MPC · JPL |
| 96835 | 1999 RZ_{199} | — | September 8, 1999 | Socorro | LINEAR | · | 4.1 km | MPC · JPL |
| 96836 | 1999 RU_{200} | — | September 8, 1999 | Socorro | LINEAR | · | 3.8 km | MPC · JPL |
| 96837 | 1999 RC_{202} | — | September 8, 1999 | Socorro | LINEAR | ADE | 5.1 km | MPC · JPL |
| 96838 | 1999 RQ_{202} | — | September 8, 1999 | Socorro | LINEAR | · | 5.4 km | MPC · JPL |
| 96839 | 1999 RW_{202} | — | September 8, 1999 | Socorro | LINEAR | · | 3.7 km | MPC · JPL |
| 96840 | 1999 RQ_{203} | — | September 8, 1999 | Socorro | LINEAR | EUN | 4.0 km | MPC · JPL |
| 96841 | 1999 RP_{205} | — | September 8, 1999 | Socorro | LINEAR | · | 3.9 km | MPC · JPL |
| 96842 | 1999 RH_{208} | — | September 8, 1999 | Socorro | LINEAR | · | 4.1 km | MPC · JPL |
| 96843 | 1999 RN_{209} | — | September 8, 1999 | Socorro | LINEAR | · | 3.1 km | MPC · JPL |
| 96844 | 1999 RO_{209} | — | September 8, 1999 | Socorro | LINEAR | · | 3.7 km | MPC · JPL |
| 96845 | 1999 RU_{209} | — | September 8, 1999 | Socorro | LINEAR | ADE | 3.5 km | MPC · JPL |
| 96846 | 1999 RC_{211} | — | September 8, 1999 | Socorro | LINEAR | ADE | 5.3 km | MPC · JPL |
| 96847 | 1999 RS_{211} | — | September 8, 1999 | Socorro | LINEAR | · | 5.3 km | MPC · JPL |
| 96848 | 1999 RL_{221} | — | September 5, 1999 | Anderson Mesa | LONEOS | · | 3.6 km | MPC · JPL |
| 96849 | 1999 RC_{224} | — | September 7, 1999 | Anderson Mesa | LONEOS | BRG | 3.2 km | MPC · JPL |
| 96850 | 1999 RR_{225} | — | September 3, 1999 | Kitt Peak | Spacewatch | · | 4.2 km | MPC · JPL |
| 96851 | 1999 RE_{229} | — | September 7, 1999 | Anderson Mesa | LONEOS | · | 4.6 km | MPC · JPL |
| 96852 | 1999 RW_{235} | — | September 8, 1999 | Catalina | CSS | · | 2.3 km | MPC · JPL |
| 96853 | 1999 RQ_{236} | — | September 8, 1999 | Catalina | CSS | · | 5.1 km | MPC · JPL |
| 96854 | 1999 RD_{238} | — | September 8, 1999 | Catalina | CSS | ADE | 5.4 km | MPC · JPL |
| 96855 | 1999 RK_{238} | — | September 8, 1999 | Catalina | CSS | · | 4.4 km | MPC · JPL |
| 96856 | 1999 RX_{238} | — | September 8, 1999 | Catalina | CSS | · | 2.7 km | MPC · JPL |
| 96857 | 1999 RQ_{242} | — | September 4, 1999 | Anderson Mesa | LONEOS | · | 5.8 km | MPC · JPL |
| 96858 | 1999 SY_{1} | — | September 18, 1999 | Socorro | LINEAR | · | 5.3 km | MPC · JPL |
| 96859 | 1999 SE_{2} | — | September 18, 1999 | Socorro | LINEAR | · | 9.9 km | MPC · JPL |
| 96860 | 1999 SG_{2} | — | September 22, 1999 | Višnjan Observatory | K. Korlević | · | 3.8 km | MPC · JPL |
| 96861 | 1999 SC_{6} | — | September 30, 1999 | Socorro | LINEAR | · | 4.1 km | MPC · JPL |
| 96862 | 1999 SE_{7} | — | September 29, 1999 | Socorro | LINEAR | · | 4.5 km | MPC · JPL |
| 96863 | 1999 SE_{8} | — | September 29, 1999 | Socorro | LINEAR | · | 3.5 km | MPC · JPL |
| 96864 | 1999 SK_{9} | — | September 29, 1999 | Socorro | LINEAR | · | 6.7 km | MPC · JPL |
| 96865 | 1999 SA_{10} | — | September 30, 1999 | Socorro | LINEAR | JUN | 2.6 km | MPC · JPL |
| 96866 | 1999 SV_{12} | — | September 30, 1999 | Socorro | LINEAR | · | 4.4 km | MPC · JPL |
| 96867 | 1999 SA_{13} | — | September 30, 1999 | Socorro | LINEAR | · | 3.7 km | MPC · JPL |
| 96868 | 1999 SH_{15} | — | September 30, 1999 | Catalina | CSS | EUN | 2.4 km | MPC · JPL |
| 96869 | 1999 SD_{19} | — | September 30, 1999 | Socorro | LINEAR | · | 8.1 km | MPC · JPL |
| 96870 | 1999 SB_{21} | — | September 30, 1999 | Kitt Peak | Spacewatch | · | 2.3 km | MPC · JPL |
| 96871 | 1999 ST_{21} | — | September 18, 1999 | Socorro | LINEAR | · | 2.9 km | MPC · JPL |
| 96872 | 1999 TC_{2} | — | October 2, 1999 | Fountain Hills | C. W. Juels | EUN | 3.6 km | MPC · JPL |
| 96873 | 1999 TH_{4} | — | October 3, 1999 | Socorro | LINEAR | · | 4.1 km | MPC · JPL |
| 96874 | 1999 TF_{8} | — | October 6, 1999 | Fountain Hills | C. W. Juels | · | 4.4 km | MPC · JPL |
| 96875 | 1999 TE_{10} | — | October 8, 1999 | Prescott | P. G. Comba | (5) | 2.5 km | MPC · JPL |
| 96876 Andreamanna | 1999 TY_{10} | Andreamanna | October 7, 1999 | Gnosca | S. Sposetti | · | 3.0 km | MPC · JPL |
| 96877 | 1999 TF_{13} | — | October 10, 1999 | Oohira | T. Urata | MAR | 3.7 km | MPC · JPL |
| 96878 | 1999 TE_{16} | — | October 11, 1999 | Črni Vrh | Mikuž, H. | JUN | 2.6 km | MPC · JPL |
| 96879 | 1999 TG_{16} | — | October 11, 1999 | Monte Agliale | S. Donati | · | 3.9 km | MPC · JPL |
| 96880 | 1999 TD_{18} | — | October 10, 1999 | Xinglong | SCAP | · | 2.2 km | MPC · JPL |
| 96881 | 1999 TD_{21} | — | October 3, 1999 | Socorro | LINEAR | · | 4.8 km | MPC · JPL |
| 96882 | 1999 TQ_{23} | — | October 3, 1999 | Kitt Peak | Spacewatch | · | 2.0 km | MPC · JPL |
| 96883 | 1999 TA_{24} | — | October 4, 1999 | Kitt Peak | Spacewatch | · | 2.4 km | MPC · JPL |
| 96884 | 1999 TP_{25} | — | October 3, 1999 | Socorro | LINEAR | · | 2.5 km | MPC · JPL |
| 96885 | 1999 TK_{26} | — | October 3, 1999 | Socorro | LINEAR | · | 2.8 km | MPC · JPL |
| 96886 | 1999 TT_{26} | — | October 3, 1999 | Socorro | LINEAR | · | 2.7 km | MPC · JPL |
| 96887 | 1999 TB_{32} | — | October 4, 1999 | Socorro | LINEAR | · | 3.6 km | MPC · JPL |
| 96888 | 1999 TH_{34} | — | October 1, 1999 | Catalina | CSS | · | 2.6 km | MPC · JPL |
| 96889 | 1999 TQ_{35} | — | October 4, 1999 | Socorro | LINEAR | · | 5.8 km | MPC · JPL |
| 96890 | 1999 TE_{36} | — | October 3, 1999 | Anderson Mesa | LONEOS | V | 2.3 km | MPC · JPL |
| 96891 | 1999 TC_{37} | — | October 13, 1999 | Anderson Mesa | LONEOS | EUN | 3.4 km | MPC · JPL |
| 96892 | 1999 TY_{38} | — | October 3, 1999 | Catalina | CSS | · | 3.5 km | MPC · JPL |
| 96893 | 1999 TM_{39} | — | October 3, 1999 | Catalina | CSS | · | 3.2 km | MPC · JPL |
| 96894 | 1999 TV_{40} | — | October 5, 1999 | Catalina | CSS | KOR | 3.2 km | MPC · JPL |
| 96895 | 1999 TY_{40} | — | October 5, 1999 | Catalina | CSS | MRX | 3.1 km | MPC · JPL |
| 96896 | 1999 TM_{43} | — | October 3, 1999 | Kitt Peak | Spacewatch | · | 3.2 km | MPC · JPL |
| 96897 | 1999 TJ_{56} | — | October 6, 1999 | Kitt Peak | Spacewatch | · | 4.6 km | MPC · JPL |
| 96898 | 1999 TV_{58} | — | October 6, 1999 | Kitt Peak | Spacewatch | KOR | 3.1 km | MPC · JPL |
| 96899 | 1999 TB_{59} | — | October 6, 1999 | Kitt Peak | Spacewatch | · | 5.7 km | MPC · JPL |
| 96900 | 1999 TC_{69} | — | October 9, 1999 | Kitt Peak | Spacewatch | NYS | 2.8 km | MPC · JPL |

== 96901–97000 ==
back to top

| Designation | | | Discovery | | | Properties | | Ref |
| Permanent | Provisional | Named after | Date | Site | Discoverer(s) | Category | Diam. | Ref |
|---|---|---|---|---|---|---|---|---|
| 96901 | 1999 TM_{70} | — | October 9, 1999 | Kitt Peak | Spacewatch | HOF | 5.9 km | MPC · JPL |
| 96902 | 1999 TH_{81} | — | October 11, 1999 | Kitt Peak | Spacewatch | · | 5.5 km | MPC · JPL |
| 96903 | 1999 TJ_{83} | — | October 12, 1999 | Kitt Peak | Spacewatch | · | 5.1 km | MPC · JPL |
| 96904 | 1999 TN_{95} | — | October 2, 1999 | Socorro | LINEAR | · | 6.2 km | MPC · JPL |
| 96905 | 1999 TT_{95} | — | October 2, 1999 | Socorro | LINEAR | AGN | 2.9 km | MPC · JPL |
| 96906 | 1999 TJ_{98} | — | October 2, 1999 | Socorro | LINEAR | · | 4.9 km | MPC · JPL |
| 96907 | 1999 TC_{99} | — | October 2, 1999 | Socorro | LINEAR | · | 3.0 km | MPC · JPL |
| 96908 | 1999 TP_{99} | — | October 2, 1999 | Socorro | LINEAR | · | 6.0 km | MPC · JPL |
| 96909 | 1999 TC_{101} | — | October 2, 1999 | Socorro | LINEAR | EUN | 2.9 km | MPC · JPL |
| 96910 | 1999 TX_{102} | — | October 2, 1999 | Socorro | LINEAR | EUN | 3.5 km | MPC · JPL |
| 96911 | 1999 TY_{102} | — | October 2, 1999 | Socorro | LINEAR | · | 3.7 km | MPC · JPL |
| 96912 | 1999 TB_{103} | — | October 2, 1999 | Socorro | LINEAR | · | 3.9 km | MPC · JPL |
| 96913 | 1999 TO_{103} | — | October 3, 1999 | Socorro | LINEAR | · | 5.0 km | MPC · JPL |
| 96914 | 1999 TP_{103} | — | October 3, 1999 | Socorro | LINEAR | · | 2.0 km | MPC · JPL |
| 96915 | 1999 TC_{105} | — | October 3, 1999 | Socorro | LINEAR | · | 1.7 km | MPC · JPL |
| 96916 | 1999 TL_{107} | — | October 4, 1999 | Socorro | LINEAR | · | 2.0 km | MPC · JPL |
| 96917 | 1999 TD_{113} | — | October 4, 1999 | Socorro | LINEAR | (5) | 2.7 km | MPC · JPL |
| 96918 | 1999 TJ_{113} | — | October 4, 1999 | Socorro | LINEAR | PHO | 5.6 km | MPC · JPL |
| 96919 | 1999 TU_{113} | — | October 4, 1999 | Socorro | LINEAR | ADE | 5.0 km | MPC · JPL |
| 96920 | 1999 TD_{116} | — | October 4, 1999 | Socorro | LINEAR | AGN | 2.3 km | MPC · JPL |
| 96921 | 1999 TN_{117} | — | October 4, 1999 | Socorro | LINEAR | · | 3.0 km | MPC · JPL |
| 96922 | 1999 TO_{118} | — | October 4, 1999 | Socorro | LINEAR | · | 2.8 km | MPC · JPL |
| 96923 | 1999 TM_{121} | — | October 4, 1999 | Socorro | LINEAR | · | 3.1 km | MPC · JPL |
| 96924 | 1999 TV_{122} | — | October 4, 1999 | Socorro | LINEAR | · | 3.1 km | MPC · JPL |
| 96925 | 1999 TX_{125} | — | October 4, 1999 | Socorro | LINEAR | · | 3.6 km | MPC · JPL |
| 96926 | 1999 TD_{126} | — | October 4, 1999 | Socorro | LINEAR | · | 2.3 km | MPC · JPL |
| 96927 | 1999 TX_{126} | — | October 15, 1999 | Socorro | LINEAR | · | 3.8 km | MPC · JPL |
| 96928 | 1999 TU_{128} | — | October 6, 1999 | Socorro | LINEAR | · | 4.5 km | MPC · JPL |
| 96929 | 1999 TW_{128} | — | October 6, 1999 | Socorro | LINEAR | · | 2.5 km | MPC · JPL |
| 96930 | 1999 TD_{129} | — | October 6, 1999 | Socorro | LINEAR | · | 3.2 km | MPC · JPL |
| 96931 | 1999 TR_{129} | — | October 6, 1999 | Socorro | LINEAR | · | 2.3 km | MPC · JPL |
| 96932 | 1999 TG_{130} | — | October 6, 1999 | Socorro | LINEAR | · | 2.6 km | MPC · JPL |
| 96933 | 1999 TV_{130} | — | October 6, 1999 | Socorro | LINEAR | · | 2.0 km | MPC · JPL |
| 96934 | 1999 TC_{132} | — | October 6, 1999 | Socorro | LINEAR | · | 2.2 km | MPC · JPL |
| 96935 | 1999 TJ_{135} | — | October 6, 1999 | Socorro | LINEAR | · | 3.8 km | MPC · JPL |
| 96936 | 1999 TW_{140} | — | October 6, 1999 | Socorro | LINEAR | MRX | 2.6 km | MPC · JPL |
| 96937 | 1999 TY_{140} | — | October 6, 1999 | Socorro | LINEAR | · | 3.0 km | MPC · JPL |
| 96938 | 1999 TQ_{146} | — | October 7, 1999 | Socorro | LINEAR | · | 4.6 km | MPC · JPL |
| 96939 | 1999 TW_{146} | — | October 7, 1999 | Socorro | LINEAR | · | 2.8 km | MPC · JPL |
| 96940 | 1999 TX_{149} | — | October 7, 1999 | Socorro | LINEAR | KOR | 3.0 km | MPC · JPL |
| 96941 | 1999 TF_{153} | — | October 7, 1999 | Socorro | LINEAR | · | 7.3 km | MPC · JPL |
| 96942 | 1999 TQ_{154} | — | October 7, 1999 | Socorro | LINEAR | · | 2.2 km | MPC · JPL |
| 96943 | 1999 TE_{157} | — | October 9, 1999 | Socorro | LINEAR | · | 3.0 km | MPC · JPL |
| 96944 | 1999 TK_{161} | — | October 9, 1999 | Socorro | LINEAR | · | 1.9 km | MPC · JPL |
| 96945 | 1999 TB_{163} | — | October 9, 1999 | Socorro | LINEAR | KOR | 3.1 km | MPC · JPL |
| 96946 | 1999 TT_{163} | — | October 9, 1999 | Socorro | LINEAR | EUN | 5.3 km | MPC · JPL |
| 96947 | 1999 TD_{167} | — | October 10, 1999 | Socorro | LINEAR | · | 2.8 km | MPC · JPL |
| 96948 | 1999 TB_{168} | — | October 10, 1999 | Socorro | LINEAR | · | 3.0 km | MPC · JPL |
| 96949 | 1999 TG_{170} | — | October 10, 1999 | Socorro | LINEAR | MRX | 2.6 km | MPC · JPL |
| 96950 | 1999 TU_{171} | — | October 10, 1999 | Socorro | LINEAR | MIS | 4.0 km | MPC · JPL |
| 96951 | 1999 TC_{173} | — | October 10, 1999 | Socorro | LINEAR | (5) | 2.8 km | MPC · JPL |
| 96952 | 1999 TP_{174} | — | October 10, 1999 | Socorro | LINEAR | · | 5.5 km | MPC · JPL |
| 96953 | 1999 TY_{175} | — | October 10, 1999 | Socorro | LINEAR | · | 4.1 km | MPC · JPL |
| 96954 | 1999 TU_{176} | — | October 10, 1999 | Socorro | LINEAR | · | 10 km | MPC · JPL |
| 96955 | 1999 TP_{177} | — | October 10, 1999 | Socorro | LINEAR | KOR | 2.8 km | MPC · JPL |
| 96956 | 1999 TS_{183} | — | October 12, 1999 | Socorro | LINEAR | · | 2.9 km | MPC · JPL |
| 96957 | 1999 TZ_{183} | — | October 12, 1999 | Socorro | LINEAR | · | 3.9 km | MPC · JPL |
| 96958 | 1999 TM_{184} | — | October 12, 1999 | Socorro | LINEAR | EUN | 2.9 km | MPC · JPL |
| 96959 | 1999 TT_{184} | — | October 12, 1999 | Socorro | LINEAR | EUN | 4.0 km | MPC · JPL |
| 96960 | 1999 TV_{184} | — | October 12, 1999 | Socorro | LINEAR | · | 4.4 km | MPC · JPL |
| 96961 | 1999 TZ_{184} | — | October 12, 1999 | Socorro | LINEAR | MAR | 2.3 km | MPC · JPL |
| 96962 | 1999 TK_{185} | — | October 12, 1999 | Socorro | LINEAR | DOR | 6.1 km | MPC · JPL |
| 96963 | 1999 TR_{186} | — | October 12, 1999 | Socorro | LINEAR | EUN | 3.6 km | MPC · JPL |
| 96964 | 1999 TF_{187} | — | October 12, 1999 | Socorro | LINEAR | EUN | 3.7 km | MPC · JPL |
| 96965 | 1999 TC_{188} | — | October 12, 1999 | Socorro | LINEAR | EUN | 2.7 km | MPC · JPL |
| 96966 | 1999 TG_{188} | — | October 12, 1999 | Socorro | LINEAR | JUN | 2.5 km | MPC · JPL |
| 96967 | 1999 TG_{189} | — | October 12, 1999 | Socorro | LINEAR | · | 7.7 km | MPC · JPL |
| 96968 | 1999 TP_{189} | — | October 12, 1999 | Socorro | LINEAR | GEF | 2.5 km | MPC · JPL |
| 96969 | 1999 TE_{190} | — | October 12, 1999 | Socorro | LINEAR | slow | 4.4 km | MPC · JPL |
| 96970 | 1999 TO_{192} | — | October 12, 1999 | Socorro | LINEAR | · | 3.5 km | MPC · JPL |
| 96971 | 1999 TB_{193} | — | October 12, 1999 | Socorro | LINEAR | (32418) | 4.5 km | MPC · JPL |
| 96972 | 1999 TE_{193} | — | October 12, 1999 | Socorro | LINEAR | · | 6.9 km | MPC · JPL |
| 96973 | 1999 TN_{193} | — | October 12, 1999 | Socorro | LINEAR | EUN | 3.2 km | MPC · JPL |
| 96974 | 1999 TL_{194} | — | October 12, 1999 | Socorro | LINEAR | · | 5.6 km | MPC · JPL |
| 96975 | 1999 TA_{197} | — | October 12, 1999 | Socorro | LINEAR | EUN | 2.8 km | MPC · JPL |
| 96976 | 1999 TG_{197} | — | October 12, 1999 | Socorro | LINEAR | · | 4.8 km | MPC · JPL |
| 96977 | 1999 TH_{197} | — | October 12, 1999 | Socorro | LINEAR | · | 3.3 km | MPC · JPL |
| 96978 | 1999 TW_{197} | — | October 12, 1999 | Socorro | LINEAR | EUN | 3.2 km | MPC · JPL |
| 96979 | 1999 TZ_{197} | — | October 12, 1999 | Socorro | LINEAR | · | 3.5 km | MPC · JPL |
| 96980 | 1999 TM_{198} | — | October 12, 1999 | Socorro | LINEAR | MAR | 2.7 km | MPC · JPL |
| 96981 | 1999 TB_{201} | — | October 13, 1999 | Socorro | LINEAR | ADE | 3.7 km | MPC · JPL |
| 96982 | 1999 TA_{209} | — | October 14, 1999 | Socorro | LINEAR | · | 4.7 km | MPC · JPL |
| 96983 | 1999 TH_{210} | — | October 14, 1999 | Socorro | LINEAR | · | 5.3 km | MPC · JPL |
| 96984 | 1999 TT_{211} | — | October 15, 1999 | Socorro | LINEAR | · | 3.0 km | MPC · JPL |
| 96985 | 1999 TT_{212} | — | October 15, 1999 | Socorro | LINEAR | · | 4.1 km | MPC · JPL |
| 96986 | 1999 TK_{213} | — | October 15, 1999 | Socorro | LINEAR | · | 5.2 km | MPC · JPL |
| 96987 | 1999 TS_{213} | — | October 15, 1999 | Socorro | LINEAR | · | 2.4 km | MPC · JPL |
| 96988 | 1999 TP_{214} | — | October 15, 1999 | Socorro | LINEAR | · | 2.7 km | MPC · JPL |
| 96989 | 1999 TA_{215} | — | October 15, 1999 | Socorro | LINEAR | KOR | 3.6 km | MPC · JPL |
| 96990 | 1999 TQ_{215} | — | October 15, 1999 | Socorro | LINEAR | · | 2.5 km | MPC · JPL |
| 96991 | 1999 TW_{216} | — | October 15, 1999 | Socorro | LINEAR | · | 4.2 km | MPC · JPL |
| 96992 | 1999 TM_{217} | — | October 15, 1999 | Socorro | LINEAR | · | 1.5 km | MPC · JPL |
| 96993 | 1999 TW_{219} | — | October 1, 1999 | Catalina | CSS | EUN | 3.2 km | MPC · JPL |
| 96994 | 1999 TB_{220} | — | October 1, 1999 | Catalina | CSS | · | 4.6 km | MPC · JPL |
| 96995 | 1999 TH_{220} | — | October 1, 1999 | Catalina | CSS | · | 3.1 km | MPC · JPL |
| 96996 | 1999 TY_{220} | — | October 2, 1999 | Anderson Mesa | LONEOS | DOR | 7.2 km | MPC · JPL |
| 96997 | 1999 TF_{225} | — | October 2, 1999 | Kitt Peak | Spacewatch | (5) | 1.6 km | MPC · JPL |
| 96998 | 1999 TX_{225} | — | October 2, 1999 | Kitt Peak | Spacewatch | NYS | 2.8 km | MPC · JPL |
| 96999 | 1999 TB_{230} | — | October 3, 1999 | Socorro | LINEAR | GEF | 2.5 km | MPC · JPL |
| 97000 | 1999 TB_{233} | — | October 7, 1999 | Catalina | CSS | MAR | 3.4 km | MPC · JPL |

back to top

== See also ==
- Meanings of minor-planet names: 96001–97000
