= South Calgary =

South Calgary may refer to:

- South Calgary, Calgary, a neighbourhood in Calgary, Alberta
- Calgary South, a defunct federal electoral district in Alberta, Canada, active from 1953 to 1988
- Calgary South (provincial electoral district), a defunct provincial electoral district in Alberta, Canada, active from 1963 to 1971
- Calgary-South East, a provincial electoral district in Alberta, Canada, active from 1959 to 1963 and since 2012
- De Winton/South Calgary Airport, an airport south of Calgary, Alberta
- South Calgary (provincial electoral district), a defunct provincial electoral district, active from 1913 to 1921
- Calgary Southeast, a defunct federal electoral district, active from 1988 to 2015
