= List of named minor planets: 90000–99999 =

This is a partial list of named minor planets in numerical order. It contains a total of 238 entries as of 9 November 2026. Minor planets for which no article exist are displayed in grey color and redirect to the list of minor planets (see List of minor planets § Main index).

== From 90,000 to 99,999 ==
- 90022 Apache Point
- 90125 Chrissquire
- 90138 Diehl
- 90140 Gómezdonet
- 90226 Byronsmith
- 90278 Caprese
- 90279 Devětsil
- 90288 Dalleave
- 90308 Johney
- 90317 Williamcutlip
- 90328 Haryou
- 90368 Hristopavlov
- 90370 Jókaimór
- 90376 Kossuth
- 90377 Sedna
- 90383 Johnloiacono
- 90388 Philchristensen
- 90396 Franklopez
- 90397 Rasch
- 90414 Karpov
- 90429 Wetmore
- 90446 Truesdell
- 90447 Emans
- 90449 Brucestephenson
- 90450 Cyriltyson
- 90453 Shawnphillips
- 90455 Irenehernandez
- 90461 Matthewgraham
- 90463 Johnrichard
- 90471 Andrewdrake
- 90472 Mahabal
- 90479 Donalek
- 90480 Ulrich
- 90481 Wollstonecraft
- 90482 Orcus
- 90487 Witherspoon
- 90502 Buratti
- 90503 Japhethboyce
- 90525 Karijanberg
- 90526 Paullorenz
- 90528 Raywhite
- 90533 Laurentblind
- 90537 Daveholland
- 90564 Markjarnyk
- 90568 Goibniu
- 90579 Gordonnelson
- 90672 Metrorheinneckar
- 90698 Kościuszko
- 90703 Indulgentia
- 90709 Wettin
- 90711 Stotternheim
- 90712 Wittelsbach
- 90713 Chajnantor
- 90717 Flanders
- 90718 Castel Gandolfo
- 90732 Opdebeeck
- 90806 Rudaki
- 90817 Doylehall
- 90818 Daverichards
- 90820 McCann
- 90821 Augustsedláček
- 90825 Lizhensheng
- 90826 Xuzhihong
- 90830 Beihang
- 90837 Raoulvalentini
- 90844 Todai
- 90875 Hoshitori
- 90892 Betlémská kaple
- 90918 Jasinski
- 90919 Luoliaofu
- 90926 Stáhalík
- 90936 Neronet
- 90937 Josefdufek
- 90944 Pujol
- 90953 Hideosaitou
- 91001 Shanghaishida
- 91006 Fleming
- 91007 Ianfleming
- 91023 Lutan
- 91024 Széchenyi
- 91035 Hezehui
- 91199 Johngray
- 91212 Virgiliogonano
- 91213 Botchan
- 91214 Diclemente
- 91275 Billsmith
- 91287 Simon-Garfunkel
- 91333 Robertogorelli
- 91335 Alexandrov
- 91389 Davidsaewert
- 91395 Sakanouenokumo
- 91422 Giraudon
- 91428 Cortesi
- 91429 Michelebianda
- 91553 Claudedoom
- 91604 Clausmadsen
- 91607 Delaboudinière
- 91869 Ellenjozoff
- 91870 Malcolmjozoff
- 91888 Tomskilling
- 91890 Kiriko Matsuri
- 91898 Margnetti
- 91907 Shiho
- 92097 Aidai
- 92209 Pingtang
- 92213 Kalina
- 92251 Kuconis
- 92279 Bindiluca
- 92297 Monrad
- 92300 Hagelin
- 92389 Gretskij
- 92525 Delucchi
- 92578 Benecchi
- 92579 Dwight
- 92585 Fumagalli
- 92586 Jaxonpowell
- 92614 Kazutami
- 92685 Cordellorenz
- 92891 Bless
- 92892 Robertlawrence
- 92893 Michaelperson
- 92894 Bluford
- 93061 Barbagallo
- 93102 Leroy
- 93164 Gordontelepun
- 93256 Stach
- 94228 Leesuikwan
- 94243 Miquelroser
- 94291 Django
- 94356 Naruto
- 94400 Hongdaeyong
- 94556 Janstarý
- 94884 Takuya
- 95008 Ivanobertini
- 95016 Kimjeongho
- 95020 Nencini
- 95024 Ericaellingson
- 95072 ČVUT
- 95179 Berkó
- 95219 Borgman
- 95247 Schalansky
- 95449 Frederickgregory
- 95474 Andreajbarbieri
- 95593 Ažusienis
- 95760 Protezionecivile
- 95771 Lachat
- 95782 Hansgraf
- 95783 Marceloemilio
- 95785 Csányivilmos
- 95793 Brock
- 95802 Francismuir
- 95824 Elger
- 95851 Stromvil
- 95852 Leatherbarrow
- 95853 Jamescarpenter
- 95882 Longshaw
- 95895 Sebastiano
- 95928 Tonycook
- 95935 Grego
- 95939 Thagnesland
- 95951 Ernestopalomba
- 95954 Bayzoltán
- 95955 Claragianni
- 95959 Covadonga
- 95962 Copito
- 95980 Haroldhill
- 95982 Beish
- 96086 Toscanos
- 96178 Rochambeau
- 96189 Pygmalion
- 96192 Calgary
- 96193 Edmonton
- 96200 Oschin
- 96205 Ararat
- 96206 Eschenberg
- 96217 Gronchi
- 96254 Hoyo
- 96257 Roberto
- 96263 Lorettacavicchi
- 96268 Tomcarr
- 96296 Nanhangda
- 96327 Ullmann
- 96344 Scottweaver
- 96348 Toshiyukimariko
- 96506 Oberösterreich
- 96535 Schiehallion
- 96591 Emiliemartin
- 96612 Litipei
- 96623 Leani
- 96747 Crespodasilva
- 96765 Poznańuni
- 96876 Andreamanna
- 97069 Stek
- 97186 Tore
- 97268 Serafinozani
- 97336 Thomasafleming
- 97448 Bertorosco
- 97471 Amybrenton
- 97472 Hobby
- 97508 Bolden
- 97509 Pierrehaenecour
- 97512 Jemison
- 97578 Jessicabarnes
- 97582 Hijikawa
- 97631 Kentrobinson
- 97632 Mathewwells
- 97637 Blennert
- 97646 Karifigueroa
- 97677 Rachelfreed
- 97786 Oauam
- 98127 Vilgusová
- 98494 Marsupilami
- 98722 Elenaumberto
- 98825 Maryellen
- 98866 Giannabussolari
- 98943 Torifune
- 99070 Strittmatter
- 99193 Obsfabra
- 99201 Sattler
- 99262 Bleustein
- 99388 Londialdo
- 99389 Marconovi
- 99503 Leewonchul
- 99581 Egal
- 99824 Polnareff
- 99825 Nosworthy
- 99861 Tscharnuter
- 99862 Kenlevin
- 99863 Winnewisser
- 99891 Donwells
- 99905 Jeffgrossman
- 99906 Uofalberta
- 99915 Henarejos
- 99928 Brainard
- 99941 Lonniewege
- 99942 Apophis
- 99949 Miepgies
- 99950 Euchenor
back to top

== See also ==
- List of minor planet discoverers
- List of observatory codes
- Meanings of minor planet names § Index
