= Ken Levine =

Ken Levine may refer to:

- Ken Levine (game developer) (born 1966), American video game designer and founding member of Irrational Games
- Ken Levine (screenwriter) (born 1950), American writer, director and producer in the television and film industry
- Ken Levine, physicist who gave his name to 99862 Kenlevin
