= Meanings of minor-planet names: 99001–100000 =

As minor planet discoveries are confirmed, they are given a permanent number by the IAU's Minor Planet Center (MPC), and the discoverers can then submit names for them, following the IAU's naming conventions. The list below concerns those minor planets in the specified number-range that have received names, and explains the meanings of those names.

Official naming citations of newly named small Solar System bodies are approved and published in a bulletin by IAU's Working Group for Small Bodies Nomenclature (WGSBN). Before May 2021, citations were published in MPC's Minor Planet Circulars for many decades. Recent citations can also be found on the JPL Small-Body Database (SBDB). Until his death in 2016, German astronomer Lutz D. Schmadel compiled these citations into the Dictionary of Minor Planet Names (DMP) and regularly updated the collection.

Based on Paul Herget's The Names of the Minor Planets, Schmadel also researched the unclear origin of numerous asteroids, most of which had been named prior to World War II. This article incorporates text from this source, which is in the public domain: SBDB New namings may only be added to this list below after official publication as the preannouncement of names is condemned. The WGSBN publishes a comprehensive guideline for the naming rules of non-cometary small Solar System bodies.

== 99001–99100 ==
Named minor planet	Provisional	This minor planet was named for...	Ref · Catalog
99070 Strittmatter	2001 FA_{10}	Peter Strittmatter (born 1939) is an American astronomer, involved with the Large Binocular Telescope and Giant Magellan Telescope projects, as well as regent professor, chairman of astronomy and director of the Steward Observatory at the University of Arizona.	JPL · 99070

== 99101–99200 ==
back to top

Named minor planet	Provisional	This minor planet was named for...	Ref · Catalog
99193 Obsfabra	2001 GN_{4}	The Fabra Observatory in Barcelona, Spain. It was inaugurated on 7 April 1904 and has been known for its work in astronomy, meteorology and seismology.	JPL · 99193

== 99201–99300 ==
back to top

Named minor planet	Provisional	This minor planet was named for...	Ref · Catalog
99201 Sattler	2001 HY_{16}	Birgit I. Sattler (born 1969), Austrian limnologist, zoologist, and Antarctic explorer at the department of limnology and zoology at the University of Innsbruck. The two Antarctica expeditions she was a member of were sponsored by the National Science Foundation and the Planetary Studies Foundation, respectively. The name was suggested by H. Windolf.	JPL · 99201
99262 Bleustein	2001 OQ_{12}	Marcel Bleustein-Blanchet (1906–1996) was a French publicist and founder of the Foundation of the Vocation in 1960. The discoverer of this minor planet, Jean-Claude Merlin, was a laureate of this foundation.	JPL · 99262

== 99301–99400 ==
back to top

Named minor planet	Provisional	This minor planet was named for...	Ref · Catalog
99388 Londialdo	2002 AL	Aldo Londi, Italian painter, sculptor, and ceramist.	IAU · 99388
99389 Marconovi	2002 AN	Marco Novi (1960–2016), an Italian amateur astronomer.	IAU · 99389

== 99401–99500 ==
back to top

Named minor planet	Provisional	This minor planet was named for...	Ref · Catalog
There are no named minor planets in this number range

== 99501–99600 ==
back to top

Named minor planet	Provisional	This minor planet was named for...	Ref · Catalog
99503 Leewonchul	2002 DB_{1}	Won Chul Lee (David W. Lee; 1896–1963), Korean astronomer, the first Korean to earn a Ph.D. degree, and the first director of the National Observatory in Seoul	JPL · 99503
99581 Egal	2002 FQ_{35}	Auriane Egal (born 1991) is a postdoctoral associate at Western University in London, Canada. Her research focuses on the observation, modeling and prediction of meteor showers.	IAU · 99581

== 99601–99700 ==
back to top

Named minor planet	Provisional	This minor planet was named for...	Ref · Catalog
There are no named minor planets in this number range

== 99701–99800 ==
back to top

Named minor planet	Provisional	This minor planet was named for...	Ref · Catalog
There are no named minor planets in this number range

== 99801–99900 ==
back to top

Named minor planet	Provisional	This minor planet was named for...	Ref · Catalog
99824 Polnareff	2002 MN_{3}	Michel Polnareff (born 1944) is a French singer and a songwriter who has been very popular since his 1966 recording of the song "La poupée qui fait non"	JPL · 99824
99825 Nosworthy	2002 NK_{7}	Peter Nosworthy, Australian amateur astronomer.	IAU · 99825
99861 Tscharnuter	2002 OV_{24}	Werner M. Tscharnuter (born 1945) is an Austrian astrophysicist who has made major contributions to the fields of star formation, protoplanetary disks, stellar dynamics and Saturn's rings. He also has an interest in celestial mechanics, particularly with regard to the evolution of the Koronis family, to which this minor planet probably belongs.	JPL · 99861
99862 Kenlevin	2002 OD_{25}	Ken Levin (born 1953) is an American physicist who works in the field of infrared optics and sensors for application in medicine, aerospace and astronomy. He is an avid amateur astronomer, operates two private observatories and is a discoverer of minor planets.	JPL · 99862
99863 Winnewisser	2002 OV_{25}	Gisbert Winnewisser (1936–2011) was a German astrophysicist who established the KOSMA sub-mm telescope on Gornergrat and set up successful partnerships between the University of Cologne – of which he was the chairman of the Physics Institute from 1979 to 2001 – and research institutes worldwide. He was a member of three IAU Commissions and was honored with many prizes.	JPL · 99863
99891 Donwells	2002 PG_{165}	Don J. Wells (born 1965) is an American production manager of a Houston-area television station and a discoverer of minor planets (working from George Observatory and the Remote Astronomical Society Observatory of New Mexico).	JPL · 99891

== 99901–100000 ==
back to top

Named minor planet	Provisional	This minor planet was named for...	Ref · Catalog
99905 Jeffgrossman	2002 QX_{50}	Jeffrey N. Grossman (born 1955), an American chemist and meteoriticist at the U.S. Geological Survey in Reston, Virginia, conducts research in meteoritics and geochemistry. He is best known for his work on the origin of chondrules and chondrites and for studies of metamorphic processes on minor planets in the early Solar System.	JPL · 99905
99906 Uofalberta	2002 QV_{53}	The University of Alberta ("Uofalberta") was founded in 1908 in Edmonton and is one of the leading research institutions in Canada. The initials of its motto Quaecumque Vera ("Whatsoever things are true") appropriately appear in the provisional designation for this minor planet.	JPL · 99906
99915 Henarejos	1997 TR_{6}	Philippe Henarejos (b. 1967), a French science journalist.	IAU · 99915
99928 Brainard	2000 EQ_{147}	Bradley J. Brainard (born 1955), American surgeon at the Tucson Orthopedic Institute. He has also held a residency in orthopedic surgery at the University of Arizona School of Medicine and a fellowship in foot-and-ankle surgery at the University of Cincinnati.	JPL · 99928
99941 Lonniewege	2003 WF_{107}	Lonnie Wege (born 1958) is a telescope sales manager and a Schmidt-Cassegrain telescope technology specialist. He is also an astronomy outreach volunteer with the Three Rivers Foundation, the Texas Astronomical Society and Celestron.	JPL · 99941
99942 Apophis	2004 MN_{4}	Apep the Destroyer (or Apophis in Greek), is the Egyptian god of evil and destruction who dwelled in eternal darkness. As a result of its passage within 40,000 kilometers of the Earth on 13 April 2029, this minor planet will move from the Aten to the Apollo class.	JPL · 99942
99949 Miepgies	1972 FD	Miep Gies (1909–2010), née Hermine Santrouschitz, was one of the Dutch citizens who hid Anne Frank and her family from the Nazis during World War II. She discovered and preserved the Diary of Anne Frank after her arrest and deportation. The name was suggested by Carl Egon Koppeschaar (see 7973 Koppeschaar).	JPL · 99949
99950 Euchenor	1973 SC_{1}	Euchenor, hero from Corinth in Greek mythology, was killed in the Trojan War by Paris.	JPL · 99950
100000 Astronautica	1982 SH_{1}	"Astronautica", on the occasion of the 50th anniversary of the Space Age (beginning with the launch of Sputnik 1 in 1957), and because space arbitrarily begins at an altitude of 100,000 meters above Earth's surface (Src)	JPL · 100000

back to top

Preceded by 98,001–99,000	Meanings of minor-planet names List of minor planets: 99,001–100,000	Succeeded by 100,001–101,000
