= List of minor planets: 99001–100000 =

The following is a partial list of minor planets, running from minor-planet number 99001 through 100000, inclusive. The primary data for this and other partial lists is based on JPL's "Small-Body Orbital Elements" and data available from the Minor Planet Center. Critical list information is also provided by the MPC, unless otherwise specified from Lowell Observatory. A detailed description of the table's columns and additional sources are given on the main page including a complete list of every page in this series, and a statistical break-up on the dynamical classification of minor planets.

Also see the summary list of all named bodies in numerical and alphabetical order, and the corresponding naming citations for the number range of this particular list. New namings may only be added to this list after official publication, as the preannouncement of names is condemned by the Working Group for Small Bodies Nomenclature of the International Astronomical Union.

Near-Earth obj.	MBA (inner)	MBA (outer)	Centaur
Mars-crosser	MBA (middle)	Jupiter trojan	Trans-Neptunian obj.
Unclassified

== 99001–99100 ==
Designation			Discovery			Properties		Ref
Permanent	Provisional	Named after	Date	Site	Discoverer(s)	Category	Diam.	Ref
99001	2001 DY_{49}	—	February 16, 2001	Socorro	LINEAR	·	6.8 km	MPC · JPL
99002	2001 DN_{50}	—	February 16, 2001	Socorro	LINEAR	EOS	4.1 km	MPC · JPL
99003	2001 DZ_{50}	—	February 16, 2001	Socorro	LINEAR	·	6.8 km	MPC · JPL
99004	2001 DK_{51}	—	February 16, 2001	Socorro	LINEAR	·	3.8 km	MPC · JPL
99005	2001 DH_{52}	—	February 17, 2001	Socorro	LINEAR	(5)	2.6 km	MPC · JPL
99006	2001 DR_{52}	—	February 17, 2001	Socorro	LINEAR	·	2.4 km	MPC · JPL
99007	2001 DS_{52}	—	February 17, 2001	Socorro	LINEAR	EOS	4.8 km	MPC · JPL
99008	2001 DU_{52}	—	February 17, 2001	Socorro	LINEAR	·	2.6 km	MPC · JPL
99009	2001 DD_{54}	—	February 21, 2001	Desert Beaver	W. K. Y. Yeung	·	6.6 km	MPC · JPL
99010	2001 DF_{54}	—	February 21, 2001	Desert Beaver	W. K. Y. Yeung	·	9.0 km	MPC · JPL
99011	2001 DO_{59}	—	February 17, 2001	Socorro	LINEAR	EUN	2.7 km	MPC · JPL
99012	2001 DU_{59}	—	February 19, 2001	Socorro	LINEAR	EUN	3.6 km	MPC · JPL
99013	2001 DX_{64}	—	February 19, 2001	Socorro	LINEAR	·	3.2 km	MPC · JPL
99014	2001 DG_{65}	—	February 19, 2001	Socorro	LINEAR	·	3.2 km	MPC · JPL
99015	2001 DM_{65}	—	February 19, 2001	Socorro	LINEAR	·	5.3 km	MPC · JPL
99016	2001 DP_{65}	—	February 19, 2001	Socorro	LINEAR	·	3.4 km	MPC · JPL
99017	2001 DY_{66}	—	February 19, 2001	Socorro	LINEAR	·	5.6 km	MPC · JPL
99018	2001 DY_{68}	—	February 19, 2001	Socorro	LINEAR	·	2.4 km	MPC · JPL
99019	2001 DK_{73}	—	February 19, 2001	Socorro	LINEAR	HOF	4.6 km	MPC · JPL
99020	2001 DU_{75}	—	February 20, 2001	Socorro	LINEAR	·	5.9 km	MPC · JPL
99021	2001 DX_{78}	—	February 16, 2001	Socorro	LINEAR	·	2.7 km	MPC · JPL
99022	2001 DR_{88}	—	February 27, 2001	Kitt Peak	Spacewatch	·	4.0 km	MPC · JPL
99023	2001 DV_{88}	—	February 27, 2001	Kitt Peak	Spacewatch	fast	6.3 km	MPC · JPL
99024	2001 DO_{90}	—	February 22, 2001	Socorro	LINEAR	·	2.9 km	MPC · JPL
99025	2001 DG_{92}	—	February 20, 2001	Kitt Peak	Spacewatch	·	2.0 km	MPC · JPL
99026	2001 DX_{92}	—	February 19, 2001	Anderson Mesa	LONEOS	·	5.9 km	MPC · JPL
99027	2001 DB_{95}	—	February 21, 2001	Anderson Mesa	LONEOS	·	2.5 km	MPC · JPL
99028	2001 DC_{98}	—	February 17, 2001	Socorro	LINEAR	·	5.7 km	MPC · JPL
99029	2001 DP_{98}	—	February 17, 2001	Socorro	LINEAR	·	2.2 km	MPC · JPL
99030	2001 DU_{98}	—	February 17, 2001	Socorro	LINEAR	EUN	2.5 km	MPC · JPL
99031	2001 DW_{98}	—	February 17, 2001	Socorro	LINEAR	EUN	4.3 km	MPC · JPL
99032	2001 DJ_{100}	—	February 17, 2001	La Palma	La Palma	·	4.3 km	MPC · JPL
99033	2001 DQ_{101}	—	February 16, 2001	Socorro	LINEAR	·	6.4 km	MPC · JPL
99034	2001 DD_{109}	—	February 20, 2001	Kitt Peak	Spacewatch	EUN	3.6 km	MPC · JPL
99035	2001 EX	—	March 1, 2001	Socorro	LINEAR	·	3.6 km	MPC · JPL
99036	2001 EV_{2}	—	March 1, 2001	Socorro	LINEAR	·	2.5 km	MPC · JPL
99037	2001 EW_{2}	—	March 1, 2001	Socorro	LINEAR	·	2.2 km	MPC · JPL
99038	2001 EJ_{3}	—	March 2, 2001	Haleakala	NEAT	·	2.8 km	MPC · JPL
99039	2001 EB_{4}	—	March 2, 2001	Anderson Mesa	LONEOS	·	3.3 km	MPC · JPL
99040	2001 EF_{5}	—	March 2, 2001	Anderson Mesa	LONEOS	EUN	2.3 km	MPC · JPL
99041	2001 EQ_{5}	—	March 2, 2001	Anderson Mesa	LONEOS	AGN	2.8 km	MPC · JPL
99042	2001 EW_{5}	—	March 2, 2001	Anderson Mesa	LONEOS	·	4.1 km	MPC · JPL
99043	2001 EX_{7}	—	March 2, 2001	Anderson Mesa	LONEOS	fast	2.3 km	MPC · JPL
99044	2001 EA_{8}	—	March 2, 2001	Anderson Mesa	LONEOS	·	2.7 km	MPC · JPL
99045	2001 EQ_{8}	—	March 2, 2001	Anderson Mesa	LONEOS	fast	4.5 km	MPC · JPL
99046	2001 ET_{10}	—	March 2, 2001	Haleakala	NEAT	·	5.1 km	MPC · JPL
99047	2001 EG_{13}	—	March 14, 2001	Socorro	LINEAR	H	1.6 km	MPC · JPL
99048	2001 EP_{13}	—	March 15, 2001	Kitt Peak	Spacewatch	KOR	3.0 km	MPC · JPL
99049	2001 EX_{13}	—	March 14, 2001	Socorro	LINEAR	·	2.7 km	MPC · JPL
99050	2001 EG_{14}	—	March 15, 2001	Socorro	LINEAR	·	7.5 km	MPC · JPL
99051	2001 EE_{15}	—	March 15, 2001	Socorro	LINEAR	·	2.5 km	MPC · JPL
99052	2001 ET_{15}	—	March 15, 2001	Oizumi	T. Kobayashi	·	2.6 km	MPC · JPL
99053	2001 EU_{15}	—	March 15, 2001	Oizumi	T. Kobayashi	DOR	5.1 km	MPC · JPL
99054	2001 EV_{15}	—	March 15, 2001	Oizumi	T. Kobayashi	DOR	8.1 km	MPC · JPL
99055	2001 ES_{16}	—	March 15, 2001	Haleakala	NEAT	·	4.1 km	MPC · JPL
99056	2001 EE_{20}	—	March 15, 2001	Anderson Mesa	LONEOS	·	3.7 km	MPC · JPL
99057	2001 EL_{21}	—	March 15, 2001	Anderson Mesa	LONEOS	·	4.7 km	MPC · JPL
99058	2001 ET_{23}	—	March 15, 2001	Haleakala	NEAT	MIS · fast	3.8 km	MPC · JPL
99059	2001 EM_{24}	—	March 4, 2001	Socorro	LINEAR	·	10 km	MPC · JPL
99060	2001 ET_{25}	—	March 2, 2001	Anderson Mesa	LONEOS	·	2.6 km	MPC · JPL
99061	2001 EB_{26}	—	March 2, 2001	Anderson Mesa	LONEOS	·	1.8 km	MPC · JPL
99062	2001 FQ	—	March 16, 2001	Socorro	LINEAR	·	5.8 km	MPC · JPL
99063	2001 FZ_{1}	—	March 16, 2001	Socorro	LINEAR	·	6.9 km	MPC · JPL
99064	2001 FT_{2}	—	March 18, 2001	Socorro	LINEAR	fast	2.8 km	MPC · JPL
99065	2001 FA_{3}	—	March 18, 2001	Socorro	LINEAR	EOS	4.0 km	MPC · JPL
99066	2001 FB_{5}	—	March 18, 2001	Socorro	LINEAR	·	4.6 km	MPC · JPL
99067	2001 FN_{5}	—	March 18, 2001	Socorro	LINEAR	·	6.4 km	MPC · JPL
99068	2001 FZ_{7}	—	March 18, 2001	Socorro	LINEAR	·	4.7 km	MPC · JPL
99069	2001 FB_{8}	—	March 18, 2001	Socorro	LINEAR	·	2.5 km	MPC · JPL
99070 Strittmatter	2001 FA_{10}	Strittmatter	March 22, 2001	Junk Bond	D. Healy	slow	8.4 km	MPC · JPL
99071	2001 FK_{11}	—	March 19, 2001	Anderson Mesa	LONEOS	·	4.2 km	MPC · JPL
99072	2001 FO_{12}	—	March 19, 2001	Anderson Mesa	LONEOS	ADE	3.5 km	MPC · JPL
99073	2001 FX_{12}	—	March 19, 2001	Anderson Mesa	LONEOS	·	3.1 km	MPC · JPL
99074	2001 FU_{14}	—	March 19, 2001	Anderson Mesa	LONEOS	·	2.6 km	MPC · JPL
99075	2001 FZ_{14}	—	March 19, 2001	Anderson Mesa	LONEOS	·	3.7 km	MPC · JPL
99076	2001 FT_{15}	—	March 19, 2001	Anderson Mesa	LONEOS	·	2.0 km	MPC · JPL
99077	2001 FV_{15}	—	March 19, 2001	Anderson Mesa	LONEOS	·	5.6 km	MPC · JPL
99078	2001 FF_{16}	—	March 19, 2001	Anderson Mesa	LONEOS	·	2.8 km	MPC · JPL
99079	2001 FH_{16}	—	March 19, 2001	Anderson Mesa	LONEOS	·	6.9 km	MPC · JPL
99080	2001 FV_{16}	—	March 19, 2001	Anderson Mesa	LONEOS	·	2.1 km	MPC · JPL
99081	2001 FR_{21}	—	March 21, 2001	Anderson Mesa	LONEOS	·	6.4 km	MPC · JPL
99082	2001 FA_{23}	—	March 21, 2001	Anderson Mesa	LONEOS	·	6.0 km	MPC · JPL
99083	2001 FC_{25}	—	March 18, 2001	Socorro	LINEAR	·	2.8 km	MPC · JPL
99084	2001 FL_{26}	—	March 18, 2001	Socorro	LINEAR	·	5.1 km	MPC · JPL
99085	2001 FO_{26}	—	March 18, 2001	Socorro	LINEAR	·	6.7 km	MPC · JPL
99086	2001 FQ_{29}	—	March 18, 2001	Haleakala	NEAT	·	6.5 km	MPC · JPL
99087	2001 FV_{29}	—	March 19, 2001	Haleakala	NEAT	·	3.0 km	MPC · JPL
99088	2001 FK_{33}	—	March 18, 2001	Socorro	LINEAR	·	3.5 km	MPC · JPL
99089	2001 FR_{33}	—	March 18, 2001	Socorro	LINEAR	·	4.4 km	MPC · JPL
99090	2001 FG_{34}	—	March 18, 2001	Socorro	LINEAR	(5)	2.7 km	MPC · JPL
99091	2001 FC_{37}	—	March 18, 2001	Socorro	LINEAR	·	4.0 km	MPC · JPL
99092	2001 FR_{37}	—	March 18, 2001	Socorro	LINEAR	·	7.5 km	MPC · JPL
99093	2001 FU_{37}	—	March 18, 2001	Socorro	LINEAR	·	3.2 km	MPC · JPL
99094	2001 FE_{38}	—	March 18, 2001	Socorro	LINEAR	·	2.2 km	MPC · JPL
99095	2001 FF_{39}	—	March 18, 2001	Socorro	LINEAR	·	3.1 km	MPC · JPL
99096	2001 FU_{42}	—	March 18, 2001	Socorro	LINEAR	·	6.7 km	MPC · JPL
99097	2001 FJ_{44}	—	March 18, 2001	Socorro	LINEAR	·	3.1 km	MPC · JPL
99098	2001 FK_{45}	—	March 18, 2001	Socorro	LINEAR	·	7.3 km	MPC · JPL
99099	2001 FH_{46}	—	March 18, 2001	Socorro	LINEAR	·	4.1 km	MPC · JPL
99100	2001 FM_{49}	—	March 18, 2001	Socorro	LINEAR	KOR	3.2 km	MPC · JPL

== 99101–99200 ==
back to top

Designation			Discovery			Properties		Ref
Permanent	Provisional	Named after	Date	Site	Discoverer(s)	Category	Diam.	Ref
99101	2001 FY_{49}	—	March 18, 2001	Socorro	LINEAR	EUN	7.2 km	MPC · JPL
99102	2001 FK_{50}	—	March 18, 2001	Socorro	LINEAR	EUN	3.8 km	MPC · JPL
99103	2001 FO_{50}	—	March 18, 2001	Socorro	LINEAR	·	3.4 km	MPC · JPL
99104	2001 FZ_{52}	—	March 18, 2001	Socorro	LINEAR	·	2.8 km	MPC · JPL
99105	2001 FJ_{53}	—	March 18, 2001	Socorro	LINEAR	MIS	5.6 km	MPC · JPL
99106	2001 FA_{54}	—	March 18, 2001	Socorro	LINEAR	EUN	4.3 km	MPC · JPL
99107	2001 FX_{54}	—	March 19, 2001	Socorro	LINEAR	·	2.6 km	MPC · JPL
99108	2001 FM_{55}	—	March 21, 2001	Socorro	LINEAR	·	12 km	MPC · JPL
99109	2001 FW_{55}	—	March 23, 2001	Socorro	LINEAR	·	3.6 km	MPC · JPL
99110	2001 FL_{56}	—	March 23, 2001	Socorro	LINEAR	·	2.5 km	MPC · JPL
99111	2001 FN_{61}	—	March 19, 2001	Socorro	LINEAR	·	3.0 km	MPC · JPL
99112	2001 FP_{62}	—	March 19, 2001	Socorro	LINEAR	NEM	5.2 km	MPC · JPL
99113	2001 FR_{62}	—	March 19, 2001	Socorro	LINEAR	·	6.4 km	MPC · JPL
99114	2001 FN_{63}	—	March 19, 2001	Socorro	LINEAR	·	2.8 km	MPC · JPL
99115	2001 FF_{65}	—	March 19, 2001	Socorro	LINEAR	PAD	4.7 km	MPC · JPL
99116	2001 FG_{67}	—	March 19, 2001	Socorro	LINEAR	·	3.5 km	MPC · JPL
99117	2001 FB_{68}	—	March 19, 2001	Socorro	LINEAR	·	3.9 km	MPC · JPL
99118	2001 FO_{68}	—	March 19, 2001	Socorro	LINEAR	(18466)	4.5 km	MPC · JPL
99119	2001 FF_{69}	—	March 19, 2001	Socorro	LINEAR	·	4.7 km	MPC · JPL
99120	2001 FH_{73}	—	March 19, 2001	Socorro	LINEAR	MRX	2.4 km	MPC · JPL
99121	2001 FK_{74}	—	March 19, 2001	Socorro	LINEAR	·	4.0 km	MPC · JPL
99122	2001 FQ_{75}	—	March 19, 2001	Socorro	LINEAR	·	3.2 km	MPC · JPL
99123	2001 FB_{78}	—	March 19, 2001	Socorro	LINEAR	EOS	5.0 km	MPC · JPL
99124	2001 FW_{79}	—	March 21, 2001	Socorro	LINEAR	·	5.7 km	MPC · JPL
99125	2001 FV_{80}	—	March 21, 2001	Socorro	LINEAR	·	4.2 km	MPC · JPL
99126	2001 FV_{81}	—	March 23, 2001	Socorro	LINEAR	·	4.2 km	MPC · JPL
99127	2001 FR_{87}	—	March 21, 2001	Anderson Mesa	LONEOS	·	4.7 km	MPC · JPL
99128	2001 FJ_{93}	—	March 16, 2001	Socorro	LINEAR	VER	6.6 km	MPC · JPL
99129	2001 FT_{96}	—	March 16, 2001	Socorro	LINEAR	·	2.7 km	MPC · JPL
99130	2001 FL_{97}	—	March 16, 2001	Socorro	LINEAR	·	5.3 km	MPC · JPL
99131	2001 FN_{97}	—	March 16, 2001	Kitt Peak	Spacewatch	AST	4.6 km	MPC · JPL
99132	2001 FK_{98}	—	March 16, 2001	Socorro	LINEAR	·	2.2 km	MPC · JPL
99133	2001 FQ_{98}	—	March 16, 2001	Socorro	LINEAR	·	2.9 km	MPC · JPL
99134	2001 FF_{99}	—	March 16, 2001	Kitt Peak	Spacewatch	·	3.8 km	MPC · JPL
99135	2001 FK_{99}	—	March 16, 2001	Socorro	LINEAR	·	3.8 km	MPC · JPL
99136	2001 FN_{99}	—	March 16, 2001	Socorro	LINEAR	·	3.5 km	MPC · JPL
99137	2001 FH_{101}	—	March 17, 2001	Socorro	LINEAR	·	4.4 km	MPC · JPL
99138	2001 FV_{101}	—	March 17, 2001	Socorro	LINEAR	·	5.0 km	MPC · JPL
99139	2001 FX_{103}	—	March 18, 2001	Socorro	LINEAR	·	3.1 km	MPC · JPL
99140	2001 FM_{104}	—	March 18, 2001	Anderson Mesa	LONEOS	·	3.6 km	MPC · JPL
99141	2001 FQ_{104}	—	March 18, 2001	Anderson Mesa	LONEOS	·	7.0 km	MPC · JPL
99142	2001 FK_{106}	—	March 18, 2001	Anderson Mesa	LONEOS	·	4.8 km	MPC · JPL
99143	2001 FS_{108}	—	March 18, 2001	Socorro	LINEAR	AST	4.8 km	MPC · JPL
99144	2001 FE_{113}	—	March 18, 2001	Haleakala	NEAT	LEO	4.6 km	MPC · JPL
99145	2001 FL_{113}	—	March 18, 2001	Haleakala	NEAT	VER	6.5 km	MPC · JPL
99146	2001 FH_{117}	—	March 19, 2001	Socorro	LINEAR	·	7.4 km	MPC · JPL
99147	2001 FP_{117}	—	March 19, 2001	Socorro	LINEAR	·	5.4 km	MPC · JPL
99148	2001 FO_{121}	—	March 23, 2001	Haleakala	NEAT	·	2.9 km	MPC · JPL
99149	2001 FH_{123}	—	March 23, 2001	Anderson Mesa	LONEOS	AGN	3.6 km	MPC · JPL
99150	2001 FT_{127}	—	March 29, 2001	Kitt Peak	Spacewatch	AGN	2.4 km	MPC · JPL
99151	2001 FP_{128}	—	March 23, 2001	Črni Vrh	Mikuž, H.	MAR	3.6 km	MPC · JPL
99152	2001 FV_{128}	—	March 26, 2001	Socorro	LINEAR	HNS	2.1 km	MPC · JPL
99153	2001 FH_{129}	—	March 26, 2001	Socorro	LINEAR	·	4.8 km	MPC · JPL
99154	2001 FU_{129}	—	March 29, 2001	Socorro	LINEAR	·	4.7 km	MPC · JPL
99155	2001 FV_{129}	—	March 29, 2001	Socorro	LINEAR	MAR	3.7 km	MPC · JPL
99156	2001 FQ_{131}	—	March 20, 2001	Haleakala	NEAT	·	4.0 km	MPC · JPL
99157	2001 FR_{131}	—	March 20, 2001	Haleakala	NEAT	·	5.5 km	MPC · JPL
99158	2001 FA_{132}	—	March 20, 2001	Haleakala	NEAT	·	6.4 km	MPC · JPL
99159	2001 FK_{134}	—	March 20, 2001	Haleakala	NEAT	slow	5.4 km	MPC · JPL
99160	2001 FZ_{134}	—	March 21, 2001	Anderson Mesa	LONEOS	EUN	2.6 km	MPC · JPL
99161	2001 FG_{136}	—	March 21, 2001	Anderson Mesa	LONEOS	·	6.7 km	MPC · JPL
99162	2001 FH_{136}	—	March 21, 2001	Anderson Mesa	LONEOS	·	4.5 km	MPC · JPL
99163	2001 FO_{140}	—	March 21, 2001	Haleakala	NEAT	MRX	2.1 km	MPC · JPL
99164	2001 FX_{144}	—	March 23, 2001	Kitt Peak	Spacewatch	T_{j} (2.95)	8.0 km	MPC · JPL
99165	2001 FF_{148}	—	March 24, 2001	Anderson Mesa	LONEOS	MAR	3.9 km	MPC · JPL
99166	2001 FL_{148}	—	March 24, 2001	Anderson Mesa	LONEOS	·	2.4 km	MPC · JPL
99167	2001 FX_{151}	—	March 24, 2001	Haleakala	NEAT	CYB	14 km	MPC · JPL
99168	2001 FN_{152}	—	March 26, 2001	Socorro	LINEAR	·	2.5 km	MPC · JPL
99169	2001 FY_{152}	—	March 26, 2001	Socorro	LINEAR	·	5.7 km	MPC · JPL
99170	2001 FT_{159}	—	March 29, 2001	Anderson Mesa	LONEOS	·	2.4 km	MPC · JPL
99171	2001 FW_{159}	—	March 29, 2001	Anderson Mesa	LONEOS	·	2.4 km	MPC · JPL
99172	2001 FG_{160}	—	March 29, 2001	Anderson Mesa	LONEOS	WIT	2.1 km	MPC · JPL
99173	2001 FS_{161}	—	March 30, 2001	Socorro	LINEAR	·	5.9 km	MPC · JPL
99174	2001 FR_{163}	—	March 18, 2001	Anderson Mesa	LONEOS	·	6.7 km	MPC · JPL
99175	2001 FY_{163}	—	March 18, 2001	Kitt Peak	Spacewatch	·	3.6 km	MPC · JPL
99176	2001 FF_{164}	—	March 18, 2001	Socorro	LINEAR	VER	6.1 km	MPC · JPL
99177	2001 FN_{172}	—	March 25, 2001	Anderson Mesa	LONEOS	·	3.6 km	MPC · JPL
99178	2001 FR_{172}	—	March 25, 2001	Anderson Mesa	LONEOS	·	4.8 km	MPC · JPL
99179	2001 FP_{175}	—	March 31, 2001	Socorro	LINEAR	NAE	6.5 km	MPC · JPL
99180	2001 FJ_{176}	—	March 16, 2001	Socorro	LINEAR	·	7.7 km	MPC · JPL
99181	2001 FV_{176}	—	March 16, 2001	Socorro	LINEAR	·	1.8 km	MPC · JPL
99182	2001 FW_{178}	—	March 20, 2001	Anderson Mesa	LONEOS	MAR	3.8 km	MPC · JPL
99183	2001 FB_{180}	—	March 20, 2001	Anderson Mesa	LONEOS	EOS	4.5 km	MPC · JPL
99184	2001 FH_{188}	—	March 16, 2001	Socorro	LINEAR	EUN	2.4 km	MPC · JPL
99185	2001 FQ_{188}	—	March 16, 2001	Socorro	LINEAR	·	3.1 km	MPC · JPL
99186	2001 FO_{189}	—	March 18, 2001	Socorro	LINEAR	·	2.8 km	MPC · JPL
99187	2001 FP_{189}	—	March 18, 2001	Anderson Mesa	LONEOS	·	5.7 km	MPC · JPL
99188	2001 FQ_{190}	—	March 19, 2001	Anderson Mesa	LONEOS	DOR	4.6 km	MPC · JPL
99189	2001 FV_{190}	—	March 19, 2001	Socorro	LINEAR	·	4.5 km	MPC · JPL
99190	2001 FP_{193}	—	March 18, 2001	Anderson Mesa	LONEOS	·	4.3 km	MPC · JPL
99191	2001 FF_{194}	—	March 23, 2001	Anderson Mesa	LONEOS	URS	7.4 km	MPC · JPL
99192	2001 GD_{4}	—	April 14, 2001	Črni Vrh	Skvarč, J.	EUN	2.9 km	MPC · JPL
99193 Obsfabra	2001 GN_{4}	Obsfabra	April 14, 2001	Begues	Manteca, J.	·	8.8 km	MPC · JPL
99194	2001 GC_{5}	—	April 15, 2001	Socorro	LINEAR	·	2.6 km	MPC · JPL
99195	2001 GH_{5}	—	April 15, 2001	Socorro	LINEAR	HNS	3.2 km	MPC · JPL
99196	2001 GN_{8}	—	April 15, 2001	Socorro	LINEAR	·	2.7 km	MPC · JPL
99197	2001 GL_{10}	—	April 15, 2001	Haleakala	NEAT	·	3.7 km	MPC · JPL
99198	2001 HN_{3}	—	April 17, 2001	Socorro	LINEAR	·	7.0 km	MPC · JPL
99199	2001 HW_{11}	—	April 18, 2001	Socorro	LINEAR	·	6.7 km	MPC · JPL
99200	2001 HF_{15}	—	April 23, 2001	Anderson Mesa	LONEOS	·	3.8 km	MPC · JPL

== 99201–99300 ==
back to top

Designation			Discovery			Properties		Ref
Permanent	Provisional	Named after	Date	Site	Discoverer(s)	Category	Diam.	Ref
99201 Sattler	2001 HY_{16}	Sattler	April 25, 2001	Prescott	P. G. Comba	·	3.3 km	MPC · JPL
99202	2001 HR_{18}	—	April 24, 2001	Haleakala	NEAT	·	10 km	MPC · JPL
99203	2001 HA_{20}	—	April 26, 2001	Socorro	LINEAR	·	6.4 km	MPC · JPL
99204	2001 HE_{20}	—	April 26, 2001	Socorro	LINEAR	·	8.6 km	MPC · JPL
99205	2001 HL_{22}	—	April 25, 2001	Ametlla de Mar	Ametlla de Mar	·	3.8 km	MPC · JPL
99206	2001 HH_{25}	—	April 26, 2001	Kitt Peak	Spacewatch	AGN	2.3 km	MPC · JPL
99207	2001 HR_{27}	—	April 27, 2001	Socorro	LINEAR	MAS	1.7 km	MPC · JPL
99208	2001 HX_{27}	—	April 27, 2001	Socorro	LINEAR	EOS	5.0 km	MPC · JPL
99209	2001 HZ_{28}	—	April 27, 2001	Socorro	LINEAR	·	3.2 km	MPC · JPL
99210	2001 HK_{32}	—	April 23, 2001	Socorro	LINEAR	·	2.2 km	MPC · JPL
99211	2001 HD_{37}	—	April 29, 2001	Socorro	LINEAR	·	2.5 km	MPC · JPL
99212	2001 HD_{38}	—	April 30, 2001	Desert Beaver	W. K. Y. Yeung	·	5.1 km	MPC · JPL
99213	2001 HL_{38}	—	April 30, 2001	Desert Beaver	W. K. Y. Yeung	·	5.1 km	MPC · JPL
99214	2001 HF_{41}	—	April 27, 2001	Socorro	LINEAR	·	3.3 km	MPC · JPL
99215	2001 HU_{45}	—	April 17, 2001	Anderson Mesa	LONEOS	·	4.5 km	MPC · JPL
99216	2001 HG_{48}	—	April 21, 2001	Socorro	LINEAR	EUN	2.4 km	MPC · JPL
99217	2001 HJ_{48}	—	April 21, 2001	Socorro	LINEAR	EUN	2.7 km	MPC · JPL
99218	2001 HV_{50}	—	April 23, 2001	Socorro	LINEAR	·	2.7 km	MPC · JPL
99219	2001 HY_{53}	—	April 24, 2001	Anderson Mesa	LONEOS	·	9.2 km	MPC · JPL
99220	2001 HE_{54}	—	April 24, 2001	Anderson Mesa	LONEOS	·	5.1 km	MPC · JPL
99221	2001 HP_{55}	—	April 24, 2001	Socorro	LINEAR	DOR	5.3 km	MPC · JPL
99222	2001 HQ_{55}	—	April 24, 2001	Socorro	LINEAR	·	4.6 km	MPC · JPL
99223	2001 HJ_{57}	—	April 25, 2001	Anderson Mesa	LONEOS	·	5.6 km	MPC · JPL
99224	2001 HC_{58}	—	April 25, 2001	Anderson Mesa	LONEOS	slow	6.3 km	MPC · JPL
99225	2001 HX_{59}	—	April 23, 2001	Socorro	LINEAR	fast	2.8 km	MPC · JPL
99226	2001 HO_{60}	—	April 24, 2001	Anderson Mesa	LONEOS	·	4.7 km	MPC · JPL
99227	2001 HR_{60}	—	April 24, 2001	Anderson Mesa	LONEOS	·	10 km	MPC · JPL
99228	2001 HJ_{62}	—	April 26, 2001	Anderson Mesa	LONEOS	·	2.2 km	MPC · JPL
99229	2001 HK_{63}	—	April 26, 2001	Anderson Mesa	LONEOS	·	6.9 km	MPC · JPL
99230	2001 KL	—	May 17, 2001	Socorro	LINEAR	·	3.2 km	MPC · JPL
99231	2001 KC_{1}	—	May 17, 2001	Socorro	LINEAR	·	6.5 km	MPC · JPL
99232	2001 KP_{4}	—	May 17, 2001	Socorro	LINEAR	EOS	4.4 km	MPC · JPL
99233	2001 KJ_{7}	—	May 17, 2001	Socorro	LINEAR	·	7.4 km	MPC · JPL
99234	2001 KU_{13}	—	May 17, 2001	Socorro	LINEAR	MAS	1.8 km	MPC · JPL
99235	2001 KU_{29}	—	May 21, 2001	Socorro	LINEAR	·	4.0 km	MPC · JPL
99236	2001 KV_{31}	—	May 22, 2001	Socorro	LINEAR	·	7.2 km	MPC · JPL
99237	2001 KD_{33}	—	May 24, 2001	Reedy Creek	J. Broughton	·	6.2 km	MPC · JPL
99238	2001 KQ_{35}	—	May 18, 2001	Socorro	LINEAR	·	7.9 km	MPC · JPL
99239	2001 KX_{36}	—	May 21, 2001	Socorro	LINEAR	HYG	6.1 km	MPC · JPL
99240	2001 KH_{37}	—	May 21, 2001	Socorro	LINEAR	·	8.6 km	MPC · JPL
99241	2001 KV_{51}	—	May 16, 2001	Kitt Peak	Spacewatch	·	7.2 km	MPC · JPL
99242	2001 KG_{52}	—	May 17, 2001	Kitt Peak	Spacewatch	GEF	2.6 km	MPC · JPL
99243	2001 KH_{54}	—	May 22, 2001	Haleakala	NEAT	EOS	5.0 km	MPC · JPL
99244	2001 KV_{54}	—	May 28, 2001	Socorro	LINEAR	TIN	5.1 km	MPC · JPL
99245	2001 KG_{61}	—	May 17, 2001	Haleakala	NEAT	DOR	4.4 km	MPC · JPL
99246	2001 KY_{62}	—	May 18, 2001	Anderson Mesa	LONEOS	·	2.8 km	MPC · JPL
99247	2001 KV_{65}	—	May 22, 2001	Anderson Mesa	LONEOS	·	7.9 km	MPC · JPL
99248	2001 KY_{66}	—	May 29, 2001	Palomar	NEAT	APO +1km · PHA	1.1 km	MPC · JPL
99249	2001 KW_{70}	—	May 24, 2001	Anderson Mesa	LONEOS	HYG	5.1 km	MPC · JPL
99250	2001 LH	—	June 10, 2001	Desert Beaver	W. K. Y. Yeung	TIR	5.4 km	MPC · JPL
99251	2001 LM	—	June 13, 2001	Kitt Peak	Spacewatch	T_{j} (2.99) · HIL · 3:2	10 km	MPC · JPL
99252	2001 LJ_{1}	—	June 13, 2001	Socorro	LINEAR	·	4.1 km	MPC · JPL
99253	2001 LA_{2}	—	June 13, 2001	Socorro	LINEAR	·	6.4 km	MPC · JPL
99254	2001 LG_{11}	—	June 15, 2001	Socorro	LINEAR	·	8.0 km	MPC · JPL
99255	2001 LP_{11}	—	June 15, 2001	Socorro	LINEAR	·	7.3 km	MPC · JPL
99256	2001 LQ_{12}	—	June 15, 2001	Socorro	LINEAR	TIR ·	9.3 km	MPC · JPL
99257	2001 LT_{12}	—	June 15, 2001	Socorro	LINEAR	·	3.8 km	MPC · JPL
99258	2001 MF_{5}	—	June 21, 2001	Calar Alto	Calar Alto	·	5.0 km	MPC · JPL
99259	2001 MO_{17}	—	June 26, 2001	Kitt Peak	Spacewatch	·	4.5 km	MPC · JPL
99260	2001 MC_{28}	—	June 23, 2001	Palomar	NEAT	·	1.8 km	MPC · JPL
99261	2001 NB_{7}	—	July 15, 2001	Haleakala	NEAT	·	4.4 km	MPC · JPL
99262 Bleustein	2001 OQ_{12}	Bleustein	July 20, 2001	Le Creusot	J.-C. Merlin	EOS	5.0 km	MPC · JPL
99263	2001 OZ_{31}	—	July 23, 2001	Palomar	NEAT	H	1.1 km	MPC · JPL
99264	2001 OP_{42}	—	July 22, 2001	Palomar	NEAT	·	2.4 km	MPC · JPL
99265	2001 OQ_{62}	—	July 20, 2001	Anderson Mesa	LONEOS	·	4.1 km	MPC · JPL
99266	2001 OQ_{69}	—	July 19, 2001	Anderson Mesa	LONEOS	·	2.3 km	MPC · JPL
99267	2001 OJ_{84}	—	July 18, 2001	Kitt Peak	Spacewatch	EUP	8.9 km	MPC · JPL
99268	2001 OD_{94}	—	July 27, 2001	Anderson Mesa	LONEOS	BRA	3.6 km	MPC · JPL
99269	2001 OU_{97}	—	July 25, 2001	Haleakala	NEAT	EUP	9.2 km	MPC · JPL
99270	2001 OG_{98}	—	July 25, 2001	Palomar	NEAT	H	1.5 km	MPC · JPL
99271	2001 PJ_{2}	—	August 3, 2001	Haleakala	NEAT	·	6.2 km	MPC · JPL
99272	2001 PW_{24}	—	August 11, 2001	Haleakala	NEAT	·	8.4 km	MPC · JPL
99273	2001 PD_{28}	—	August 14, 2001	Palomar	NEAT	·	4.6 km	MPC · JPL
99274	2001 PM_{41}	—	August 11, 2001	Palomar	NEAT	·	3.8 km	MPC · JPL
99275	2001 PH_{57}	—	August 14, 2001	Haleakala	NEAT	·	4.3 km	MPC · JPL
99276	2001 QC_{20}	—	August 16, 2001	Socorro	LINEAR	3:2	10 km	MPC · JPL
99277	2001 QU_{58}	—	August 17, 2001	Socorro	LINEAR	H	2.0 km	MPC · JPL
99278	2001 QA_{68}	—	August 16, 2001	Kitt Peak	Spacewatch	H	800 m	MPC · JPL
99279	2001 QF_{70}	—	August 17, 2001	Socorro	LINEAR	·	7.2 km	MPC · JPL
99280	2001 QA_{83}	—	August 17, 2001	Socorro	LINEAR	·	2.1 km	MPC · JPL
99281	2001 QR_{99}	—	August 16, 2001	Socorro	LINEAR	H	1.1 km	MPC · JPL
99282	2001 QS_{116}	—	August 17, 2001	Socorro	LINEAR	·	2.1 km	MPC · JPL
99283	2001 QD_{120}	—	August 18, 2001	Socorro	LINEAR	·	3.0 km	MPC · JPL
99284	2001 QX_{131}	—	August 20, 2001	Socorro	LINEAR	EOS	3.6 km	MPC · JPL
99285	2001 QT_{138}	—	August 22, 2001	Socorro	LINEAR	H	1.6 km	MPC · JPL
99286	2001 QO_{139}	—	August 22, 2001	Socorro	LINEAR	H	2.4 km	MPC · JPL
99287	2001 QN_{165}	—	August 24, 2001	Haleakala	NEAT	·	6.0 km	MPC · JPL
99288	2001 QA_{203}	—	August 23, 2001	Anderson Mesa	LONEOS	PAD	3.5 km	MPC · JPL
99289	2001 QV_{205}	—	August 23, 2001	Anderson Mesa	LONEOS	·	7.5 km	MPC · JPL
99290	2001 QU_{206}	—	August 23, 2001	Anderson Mesa	LONEOS	·	2.8 km	MPC · JPL
99291	2001 QO_{220}	—	August 24, 2001	Anderson Mesa	LONEOS	RAF	2.0 km	MPC · JPL
99292	2001 QS_{226}	—	August 24, 2001	Anderson Mesa	LONEOS	·	9.3 km	MPC · JPL
99293	2001 QX_{256}	—	August 25, 2001	Socorro	LINEAR	GEF	3.2 km	MPC · JPL
99294	2001 QR_{258}	—	August 25, 2001	Socorro	LINEAR	·	8.9 km	MPC · JPL
99295	2001 QP_{274}	—	August 19, 2001	Socorro	LINEAR	·	5.3 km	MPC · JPL
99296	2001 QK_{287}	—	August 17, 2001	Socorro	LINEAR	·	2.5 km	MPC · JPL
99297	2001 RU_{14}	—	September 10, 2001	Socorro	LINEAR	·	1.8 km	MPC · JPL
99298	2001 RV_{46}	—	September 11, 2001	Socorro	LINEAR	H	1.2 km	MPC · JPL
99299	2001 RR_{48}	—	September 11, 2001	Socorro	LINEAR	H	1.7 km	MPC · JPL
99300	2001 RV_{52}	—	September 12, 2001	Socorro	LINEAR	3:2	10 km	MPC · JPL

== 99301–99400 ==
back to top

Designation			Discovery			Properties		Ref
Permanent	Provisional	Named after	Date	Site	Discoverer(s)	Category	Diam.	Ref
99301	2001 RX_{91}	—	September 11, 2001	Anderson Mesa	LONEOS	KOR	2.9 km	MPC · JPL
99302	2001 RU_{92}	—	September 11, 2001	Anderson Mesa	LONEOS	·	4.5 km	MPC · JPL
99303	2001 SJ_{2}	—	September 17, 2001	Desert Eagle	W. K. Y. Yeung	·	2.3 km	MPC · JPL
99304	2001 SF_{53}	—	September 16, 2001	Socorro	LINEAR	·	3.8 km	MPC · JPL
99305	2001 SL_{55}	—	September 16, 2001	Socorro	LINEAR	·	2.6 km	MPC · JPL
99306	2001 SC_{101}	—	September 20, 2001	Socorro	LINEAR	L5	16 km	MPC · JPL
99307	2001 SB_{182}	—	September 19, 2001	Socorro	LINEAR	·	3.0 km	MPC · JPL
99308	2001 SD_{233}	—	September 19, 2001	Socorro	LINEAR	L5	20 km	MPC · JPL
99309	2001 SH_{264}	—	September 25, 2001	Socorro	LINEAR	L5	20 km	MPC · JPL
99310	2001 SB_{282}	—	September 22, 2001	Anderson Mesa	LONEOS	H	1.2 km	MPC · JPL
99311	2001 SQ_{282}	—	September 21, 2001	Socorro	LINEAR	L5	19 km	MPC · JPL
99312	2001 SK_{290}	—	September 29, 2001	Palomar	NEAT	H	1.4 km	MPC · JPL
99313	2001 TO_{25}	—	October 14, 2001	Socorro	LINEAR	·	2.4 km	MPC · JPL
99314	2001 TM_{29}	—	October 14, 2001	Socorro	LINEAR	HOF	5.0 km	MPC · JPL
99315	2001 TF_{46}	—	October 15, 2001	Socorro	LINEAR	H	1.1 km	MPC · JPL
99316	2001 TH_{63}	—	October 13, 2001	Socorro	LINEAR	·	1.3 km	MPC · JPL
99317	2001 TN_{74}	—	October 13, 2001	Socorro	LINEAR	·	4.0 km	MPC · JPL
99318	2001 TW_{84}	—	October 14, 2001	Socorro	LINEAR	AGN	1.9 km	MPC · JPL
99319	2001 TX_{92}	—	October 14, 2001	Socorro	LINEAR	·	3.2 km	MPC · JPL
99320	2001 TF_{103}	—	October 15, 2001	Desert Eagle	W. K. Y. Yeung	·	2.1 km	MPC · JPL
99321	2001 TT_{113}	—	October 14, 2001	Socorro	LINEAR	·	1.8 km	MPC · JPL
99322	2001 TW_{136}	—	October 14, 2001	Palomar	NEAT	·	4.3 km	MPC · JPL
99323	2001 TE_{205}	—	October 11, 2001	Socorro	LINEAR	L5	17 km	MPC · JPL
99324	2001 UJ_{2}	—	October 18, 2001	Socorro	LINEAR	H	1.3 km	MPC · JPL
99325	2001 UF_{14}	—	October 23, 2001	Socorro	LINEAR	H	1.2 km	MPC · JPL
99326	2001 UA_{26}	—	October 18, 2001	Socorro	LINEAR	·	6.2 km	MPC · JPL
99327	2001 UP_{32}	—	October 16, 2001	Socorro	LINEAR	L5	17 km	MPC · JPL
99328	2001 UY_{123}	—	October 22, 2001	Palomar	NEAT	L5	16 km	MPC · JPL
99329	2001 VH_{13}	—	November 10, 2001	Socorro	LINEAR	·	5.1 km	MPC · JPL
99330	2001 VT_{15}	—	November 10, 2001	Socorro	LINEAR	PHO	5.0 km	MPC · JPL
99331	2001 VF_{41}	—	November 9, 2001	Socorro	LINEAR	·	1.8 km	MPC · JPL
99332	2001 VZ_{66}	—	November 10, 2001	Socorro	LINEAR	·	3.3 km	MPC · JPL
99333	2001 VJ_{81}	—	November 12, 2001	Haleakala	NEAT	·	2.0 km	MPC · JPL
99334	2001 VC_{92}	—	November 15, 2001	Socorro	LINEAR	L5	26 km	MPC · JPL
99335	2001 VB_{106}	—	November 12, 2001	Socorro	LINEAR	·	3.9 km	MPC · JPL
99336	2001 VD_{111}	—	November 12, 2001	Socorro	LINEAR	EOS	4.2 km	MPC · JPL
99337	2001 XR_{21}	—	December 9, 2001	Socorro	LINEAR	·	2.5 km	MPC · JPL
99338	2001 XB_{24}	—	December 10, 2001	Socorro	LINEAR	·	5.1 km	MPC · JPL
99339	2001 XY_{26}	—	December 10, 2001	Socorro	LINEAR	·	2.0 km	MPC · JPL
99340	2001 XY_{27}	—	December 10, 2001	Socorro	LINEAR	·	1.6 km	MPC · JPL
99341	2001 XP_{30}	—	December 11, 2001	Socorro	LINEAR	·	2.2 km	MPC · JPL
99342	2001 XZ_{72}	—	December 11, 2001	Socorro	LINEAR	·	3.4 km	MPC · JPL
99343	2001 XO_{83}	—	December 11, 2001	Socorro	LINEAR	·	1.9 km	MPC · JPL
99344	2001 XG_{94}	—	December 10, 2001	Socorro	LINEAR	·	1.8 km	MPC · JPL
99345	2001 XX_{100}	—	December 10, 2001	Socorro	LINEAR	·	1.6 km	MPC · JPL
99346	2001 XN_{101}	—	December 10, 2001	Socorro	LINEAR	·	2.0 km	MPC · JPL
99347	2001 XO_{104}	—	December 11, 2001	Socorro	LINEAR	·	1.8 km	MPC · JPL
99348	2001 XP_{104}	—	December 11, 2001	Socorro	LINEAR	·	1.6 km	MPC · JPL
99349	2001 XT_{107}	—	December 10, 2001	Socorro	LINEAR	·	1.5 km	MPC · JPL
99350	2001 XO_{108}	—	December 10, 2001	Socorro	LINEAR	·	2.9 km	MPC · JPL
99351	2001 XV_{119}	—	December 13, 2001	Socorro	LINEAR	·	3.0 km	MPC · JPL
99352	2001 XW_{119}	—	December 13, 2001	Socorro	LINEAR	·	2.2 km	MPC · JPL
99353	2001 XT_{133}	—	December 14, 2001	Socorro	LINEAR	·	2.7 km	MPC · JPL
99354	2001 XZ_{145}	—	December 14, 2001	Socorro	LINEAR	·	1.4 km	MPC · JPL
99355	2001 XU_{157}	—	December 14, 2001	Socorro	LINEAR	·	1.1 km	MPC · JPL
99356	2001 XG_{165}	—	December 14, 2001	Socorro	LINEAR	·	1.8 km	MPC · JPL
99357	2001 XZ_{178}	—	December 14, 2001	Socorro	LINEAR	·	2.0 km	MPC · JPL
99358	2001 XC_{179}	—	December 14, 2001	Socorro	LINEAR	·	1.3 km	MPC · JPL
99359	2001 XU_{179}	—	December 14, 2001	Socorro	LINEAR	·	2.6 km	MPC · JPL
99360	2001 XY_{182}	—	December 14, 2001	Socorro	LINEAR	·	1.1 km	MPC · JPL
99361	2001 XO_{194}	—	December 14, 2001	Socorro	LINEAR	·	2.1 km	MPC · JPL
99362	2001 XN_{197}	—	December 14, 2001	Socorro	LINEAR	·	2.2 km	MPC · JPL
99363	2001 XJ_{198}	—	December 14, 2001	Socorro	LINEAR	·	1.6 km	MPC · JPL
99364	2001 XG_{211}	—	December 11, 2001	Socorro	LINEAR	·	1.8 km	MPC · JPL
99365	2001 XY_{212}	—	December 11, 2001	Socorro	LINEAR	PHO	3.9 km	MPC · JPL
99366	2001 XD_{214}	—	December 11, 2001	Socorro	LINEAR	V	1.6 km	MPC · JPL
99367	2001 XG_{216}	—	December 14, 2001	Socorro	LINEAR	·	960 m	MPC · JPL
99368	2001 XE_{221}	—	December 15, 2001	Socorro	LINEAR	L5	15 km	MPC · JPL
99369	2001 XN_{228}	—	December 15, 2001	Socorro	LINEAR	·	1.3 km	MPC · JPL
99370	2001 XJ_{247}	—	December 15, 2001	Socorro	LINEAR	·	2.1 km	MPC · JPL
99371	2001 XX_{251}	—	December 14, 2001	Socorro	LINEAR	·	1.9 km	MPC · JPL
99372	2001 XW_{252}	—	December 14, 2001	Socorro	LINEAR	·	1.5 km	MPC · JPL
99373	2001 YU	—	December 18, 2001	Kingsnake	J. V. McClusky	·	1.9 km	MPC · JPL
99374	2001 YH_{11}	—	December 17, 2001	Socorro	LINEAR	·	1.5 km	MPC · JPL
99375	2001 YV_{48}	—	December 18, 2001	Socorro	LINEAR	·	1.7 km	MPC · JPL
99376	2001 YR_{60}	—	December 18, 2001	Socorro	LINEAR	·	1.7 km	MPC · JPL
99377	2001 YN_{73}	—	December 18, 2001	Socorro	LINEAR	·	3.6 km	MPC · JPL
99378	2001 YY_{80}	—	December 18, 2001	Socorro	LINEAR	·	1.8 km	MPC · JPL
99379	2001 YQ_{82}	—	December 18, 2001	Socorro	LINEAR	·	3.1 km	MPC · JPL
99380	2001 YB_{87}	—	December 18, 2001	Socorro	LINEAR	·	2.3 km	MPC · JPL
99381	2001 YO_{94}	—	December 19, 2001	Kitt Peak	Spacewatch	·	1.8 km	MPC · JPL
99382	2001 YR_{96}	—	December 18, 2001	Palomar	NEAT	·	1.3 km	MPC · JPL
99383	2001 YV_{109}	—	December 18, 2001	Socorro	LINEAR	·	3.8 km	MPC · JPL
99384	2001 YP_{113}	—	December 19, 2001	Socorro	LINEAR	PHO	3.1 km	MPC · JPL
99385	2001 YD_{125}	—	December 17, 2001	Socorro	LINEAR	·	3.5 km	MPC · JPL
99386	2001 YW_{148}	—	December 18, 2001	Socorro	LINEAR	HYG	6.7 km	MPC · JPL
99387	2001 YS_{152}	—	December 19, 2001	Palomar	NEAT	·	5.4 km	MPC · JPL
99388 Londialdo	2002 AL	Londialdo	January 4, 2002	San Marcello	A. Boattini, M. Tombelli	H	1.1 km	MPC · JPL
99389 Marconovi	2002 AN	Marconovi	January 5, 2002	San Marcello	L. Tesi, M. Tombelli	·	2.0 km	MPC · JPL
99390	2002 AP_{1}	—	January 6, 2002	Oizumi	T. Kobayashi	·	2.0 km	MPC · JPL
99391	2002 AK_{4}	—	January 8, 2002	Socorro	LINEAR	H	1.7 km	MPC · JPL
99392	2002 AW_{4}	—	January 9, 2002	Oaxaca	Roe, J. M.	·	1.6 km	MPC · JPL
99393	2002 AS_{11}	—	January 8, 2002	Socorro	LINEAR	·	1.3 km	MPC · JPL
99394	2002 AL_{16}	—	January 4, 2002	Haleakala	NEAT	·	3.5 km	MPC · JPL
99395	2002 AB_{19}	—	January 8, 2002	Haleakala	NEAT	H	1.7 km	MPC · JPL
99396	2002 AE_{23}	—	January 5, 2002	Haleakala	NEAT	·	2.4 km	MPC · JPL
99397	2002 AF_{24}	—	January 7, 2002	Haleakala	NEAT	·	1.9 km	MPC · JPL
99398	2002 AP_{29}	—	January 8, 2002	Socorro	LINEAR	·	6.8 km	MPC · JPL
99399	2002 AJ_{31}	—	January 9, 2002	Socorro	LINEAR	·	5.6 km	MPC · JPL
99400	2002 AV_{34}	—	January 11, 2002	Palomar	NEAT	·	1.7 km	MPC · JPL

== 99401–99500 ==
back to top

Designation			Discovery			Properties		Ref
Permanent	Provisional	Named after	Date	Site	Discoverer(s)	Category	Diam.	Ref
99401	2002 AX_{34}	—	January 12, 2002	Haleakala	NEAT	·	3.3 km	MPC · JPL
99402	2002 AT_{58}	—	January 9, 2002	Socorro	LINEAR	NYS	1.7 km	MPC · JPL
99403	2002 AX_{58}	—	January 9, 2002	Socorro	LINEAR	·	1.5 km	MPC · JPL
99404	2002 AE_{62}	—	January 11, 2002	Socorro	LINEAR	·	1.1 km	MPC · JPL
99405	2002 AJ_{62}	—	January 11, 2002	Socorro	LINEAR	·	1.8 km	MPC · JPL
99406	2002 AO_{64}	—	January 11, 2002	Socorro	LINEAR	·	1.9 km	MPC · JPL
99407	2002 AY_{64}	—	January 11, 2002	Socorro	LINEAR	·	2.1 km	MPC · JPL
99408	2002 AM_{69}	—	January 7, 2002	Palomar	NEAT	·	1.7 km	MPC · JPL
99409	2002 AD_{70}	—	January 8, 2002	Socorro	LINEAR	·	1.9 km	MPC · JPL
99410	2002 AJ_{80}	—	January 8, 2002	Socorro	LINEAR	·	980 m	MPC · JPL
99411	2002 AH_{85}	—	January 9, 2002	Socorro	LINEAR	·	1.6 km	MPC · JPL
99412	2002 AB_{106}	—	January 9, 2002	Socorro	LINEAR	·	1.5 km	MPC · JPL
99413	2002 AY_{109}	—	January 9, 2002	Socorro	LINEAR	·	1.5 km	MPC · JPL
99414	2002 AV_{121}	—	January 9, 2002	Socorro	LINEAR	MAS	1.2 km	MPC · JPL
99415	2002 AD_{123}	—	January 9, 2002	Socorro	LINEAR	·	2.0 km	MPC · JPL
99416	2002 AY_{128}	—	January 14, 2002	Desert Eagle	W. K. Y. Yeung	·	3.8 km	MPC · JPL
99417	2002 AA_{141}	—	January 13, 2002	Socorro	LINEAR	·	6.5 km	MPC · JPL
99418	2002 AR_{151}	—	January 14, 2002	Socorro	LINEAR	·	7.4 km	MPC · JPL
99419	2002 AO_{153}	—	January 14, 2002	Socorro	LINEAR	NYS	2.6 km	MPC · JPL
99420	2002 AY_{158}	—	January 13, 2002	Socorro	LINEAR	·	3.6 km	MPC · JPL
99421	2002 AC_{164}	—	January 13, 2002	Socorro	LINEAR	·	1.5 km	MPC · JPL
99422	2002 AG_{179}	—	January 14, 2002	Socorro	LINEAR	NYS	2.4 km	MPC · JPL
99423	2002 AV_{179}	—	January 14, 2002	Socorro	LINEAR	·	2.1 km	MPC · JPL
99424	2002 AU_{186}	—	January 8, 2002	Socorro	LINEAR	·	2.6 km	MPC · JPL
99425	2002 AE_{190}	—	January 11, 2002	Kitt Peak	Spacewatch	·	1.3 km	MPC · JPL
99426	2002 AX_{190}	—	January 11, 2002	Socorro	LINEAR	·	1.7 km	MPC · JPL
99427	2002 AB_{191}	—	January 11, 2002	Socorro	LINEAR	·	2.5 km	MPC · JPL
99428	2002 AO_{194}	—	January 12, 2002	Haleakala	NEAT	·	1.9 km	MPC · JPL
99429	2002 AG_{197}	—	January 14, 2002	Kitt Peak	Spacewatch	NYS	2.2 km	MPC · JPL
99430	2002 BQ_{1}	—	January 19, 2002	Desert Eagle	W. K. Y. Yeung	(883)	1.9 km	MPC · JPL
99431	2002 BP_{13}	—	January 18, 2002	Socorro	LINEAR	·	4.1 km	MPC · JPL
99432	2002 BS_{15}	—	January 19, 2002	Socorro	LINEAR	·	1.5 km	MPC · JPL
99433	2002 BN_{16}	—	January 19, 2002	Socorro	LINEAR	NYS	2.3 km	MPC · JPL
99434	2002 BC_{17}	—	January 19, 2002	Socorro	LINEAR	·	1.7 km	MPC · JPL
99435	2002 BV_{18}	—	January 21, 2002	Socorro	LINEAR	KOR	3.6 km	MPC · JPL
99436	2002 BJ_{22}	—	January 22, 2002	Socorro	LINEAR	MAS	1.7 km	MPC · JPL
99437	2002 BS_{25}	—	January 25, 2002	Palomar	NEAT	·	2.2 km	MPC · JPL
99438	2002 BT_{25}	—	January 25, 2002	Palomar	NEAT	·	2.1 km	MPC · JPL
99439	2002 CA_{1}	—	February 2, 2002	Cima Ekar	ADAS	·	1.4 km	MPC · JPL
99440	2002 CA_{2}	—	February 3, 2002	Palomar	NEAT	·	1.6 km	MPC · JPL
99441	2002 CA_{6}	—	February 4, 2002	Haleakala	NEAT	NYS	1.7 km	MPC · JPL
99442	2002 CF_{8}	—	February 4, 2002	Palomar	NEAT	·	2.0 km	MPC · JPL
99443	2002 CA_{14}	—	February 8, 2002	Desert Eagle	W. K. Y. Yeung	·	3.0 km	MPC · JPL
99444	2002 CS_{17}	—	February 6, 2002	Socorro	LINEAR	V	1.3 km	MPC · JPL
99445	2002 CQ_{22}	—	February 5, 2002	Palomar	NEAT	·	1.4 km	MPC · JPL
99446	2002 CS_{24}	—	February 6, 2002	Haleakala	NEAT	V	1.3 km	MPC · JPL
99447	2002 CX_{25}	—	February 10, 2002	Fountain Hills	C. W. Juels, P. R. Holvorcem	PHO	3.2 km	MPC · JPL
99448	2002 CF_{30}	—	February 6, 2002	Socorro	LINEAR	·	1.8 km	MPC · JPL
99449	2002 CJ_{30}	—	February 6, 2002	Socorro	LINEAR	·	3.6 km	MPC · JPL
99450	2002 CP_{34}	—	February 6, 2002	Socorro	LINEAR	·	4.2 km	MPC · JPL
99451	2002 CL_{37}	—	February 7, 2002	Socorro	LINEAR	(5)	3.7 km	MPC · JPL
99452	2002 CM_{38}	—	February 7, 2002	Socorro	LINEAR	·	2.7 km	MPC · JPL
99453	2002 CW_{42}	—	February 12, 2002	Fountain Hills	C. W. Juels, P. R. Holvorcem	·	1.6 km	MPC · JPL
99454	2002 CZ_{42}	—	February 12, 2002	Fountain Hills	C. W. Juels, P. R. Holvorcem	·	1.4 km	MPC · JPL
99455	2002 CX_{55}	—	February 7, 2002	Socorro	LINEAR	·	1.8 km	MPC · JPL
99456	2002 CH_{57}	—	February 7, 2002	Socorro	LINEAR	·	3.1 km	MPC · JPL
99457	2002 CS_{58}	—	February 13, 2002	Nashville	Clingan, R.	·	3.3 km	MPC · JPL
99458	2002 CF_{59}	—	February 12, 2002	Desert Eagle	W. K. Y. Yeung	·	1.8 km	MPC · JPL
99459	2002 CO_{62}	—	February 6, 2002	Socorro	LINEAR	·	4.8 km	MPC · JPL
99460	2002 CJ_{66}	—	February 7, 2002	Socorro	LINEAR	·	3.7 km	MPC · JPL
99461	2002 CM_{66}	—	February 7, 2002	Socorro	LINEAR	·	2.1 km	MPC · JPL
99462	2002 CE_{83}	—	February 7, 2002	Socorro	LINEAR	·	1.5 km	MPC · JPL
99463	2002 CR_{83}	—	February 7, 2002	Socorro	LINEAR	·	3.5 km	MPC · JPL
99464	2002 CC_{91}	—	February 7, 2002	Socorro	LINEAR	L4	13 km	MPC · JPL
99465	2002 CP_{93}	—	February 7, 2002	Socorro	LINEAR	MAS	1.3 km	MPC · JPL
99466	2002 CN_{96}	—	February 7, 2002	Socorro	LINEAR	·	6.3 km	MPC · JPL
99467	2002 CN_{102}	—	February 7, 2002	Socorro	LINEAR	MAS	1.8 km	MPC · JPL
99468	2002 CE_{103}	—	February 7, 2002	Socorro	LINEAR	·	3.3 km	MPC · JPL
99469	2002 CB_{107}	—	February 7, 2002	Socorro	LINEAR	·	1.9 km	MPC · JPL
99470	2002 CQ_{110}	—	February 7, 2002	Socorro	LINEAR	·	1.3 km	MPC · JPL
99471	2002 CK_{112}	—	February 7, 2002	Socorro	LINEAR	·	7.8 km	MPC · JPL
99472	2002 CO_{112}	—	February 7, 2002	Socorro	LINEAR	·	1.7 km	MPC · JPL
99473	2002 CP_{112}	—	February 7, 2002	Socorro	LINEAR	·	2.5 km	MPC · JPL
99474	2002 CE_{114}	—	February 8, 2002	Socorro	LINEAR	·	1.3 km	MPC · JPL
99475	2002 CR_{118}	—	February 13, 2002	Socorro	LINEAR	PHO	3.4 km	MPC · JPL
99476	2002 CU_{133}	—	February 7, 2002	Socorro	LINEAR	·	2.6 km	MPC · JPL
99477	2002 CG_{135}	—	February 8, 2002	Socorro	LINEAR	·	2.8 km	MPC · JPL
99478	2002 CD_{137}	—	February 8, 2002	Socorro	LINEAR	·	1.6 km	MPC · JPL
99479	2002 CS_{152}	—	February 10, 2002	Socorro	LINEAR	·	1.5 km	MPC · JPL
99480	2002 CE_{154}	—	February 9, 2002	Kitt Peak	Spacewatch	·	1.7 km	MPC · JPL
99481	2002 CY_{157}	—	February 7, 2002	Socorro	LINEAR	·	2.6 km	MPC · JPL
99482	2002 CP_{159}	—	February 7, 2002	Socorro	LINEAR	NYS ·	3.3 km	MPC · JPL
99483	2002 CE_{166}	—	February 8, 2002	Socorro	LINEAR	·	4.0 km	MPC · JPL
99484	2002 CQ_{169}	—	February 8, 2002	Socorro	LINEAR	·	2.0 km	MPC · JPL
99485	2002 CD_{170}	—	February 8, 2002	Socorro	LINEAR	·	1.8 km	MPC · JPL
99486	2002 CJ_{171}	—	February 8, 2002	Socorro	LINEAR	·	1.6 km	MPC · JPL
99487	2002 CR_{172}	—	February 8, 2002	Socorro	LINEAR	·	1.6 km	MPC · JPL
99488	2002 CW_{172}	—	February 8, 2002	Socorro	LINEAR	·	2.1 km	MPC · JPL
99489	2002 CS_{174}	—	February 8, 2002	Socorro	LINEAR	·	6.6 km	MPC · JPL
99490	2002 CD_{220}	—	February 10, 2002	Socorro	LINEAR	·	1.9 km	MPC · JPL
99491	2002 CN_{227}	—	February 6, 2002	Palomar	NEAT	·	3.1 km	MPC · JPL
99492	2002 CZ_{231}	—	February 7, 2002	Socorro	LINEAR	(5)	2.0 km	MPC · JPL
99493	2002 CR_{237}	—	February 10, 2002	Socorro	LINEAR	GEF	3.4 km	MPC · JPL
99494	2002 CH_{239}	—	February 11, 2002	Socorro	LINEAR	·	4.2 km	MPC · JPL
99495	2002 CD_{240}	—	February 11, 2002	Socorro	LINEAR	·	1.4 km	MPC · JPL
99496	2002 CH_{243}	—	February 11, 2002	Socorro	LINEAR	·	2.3 km	MPC · JPL
99497	2002 CX_{244}	—	February 11, 2002	Socorro	LINEAR	·	1.7 km	MPC · JPL
99498	2002 CQ_{246}	—	February 14, 2002	Socorro	LINEAR	PHO	2.4 km	MPC · JPL
99499	2002 CK_{247}	—	February 15, 2002	Socorro	LINEAR	·	1.4 km	MPC · JPL
99500	2002 CQ_{248}	—	February 14, 2002	Palomar	NEAT	·	1.5 km	MPC · JPL

== 99501–99600 ==
back to top

Designation			Discovery			Properties		Ref
Permanent	Provisional	Named after	Date	Site	Discoverer(s)	Category	Diam.	Ref
99501	2002 CT_{310}	—	February 8, 2002	Socorro	LINEAR	·	2.6 km	MPC · JPL
99502	2002 CW_{311}	—	February 11, 2002	Haleakala	NEAT	·	2.2 km	MPC · JPL
99503 Leewonchul	2002 DB_{1}	Leewonchul	February 16, 2002	Bohyunsan	Jeon, Y.-B.	·	4.1 km	MPC · JPL
99504	2002 DR_{12}	—	February 22, 2002	Palomar	NEAT	·	1.8 km	MPC · JPL
99505	2002 DZ_{15}	—	February 16, 2002	Haleakala	NEAT	·	2.6 km	MPC · JPL
99506	2002 DG_{17}	—	February 20, 2002	Anderson Mesa	LONEOS	·	9.0 km	MPC · JPL
99507	2002 EL_{1}	—	March 6, 2002	Ondřejov	P. Kušnirák	·	1.1 km	MPC · JPL
99508	2002 EQ_{8}	—	March 9, 2002	Kvistaberg	Uppsala-DLR Asteroid Survey	·	1.3 km	MPC · JPL
99509	2002 EL_{9}	—	March 14, 2002	Kvistaberg	Uppsala-DLR Asteroid Survey	·	2.4 km	MPC · JPL
99510	2002 EO_{12}	—	March 14, 2002	Desert Eagle	W. K. Y. Yeung	·	2.2 km	MPC · JPL
99511	2002 ES_{14}	—	March 5, 2002	Kitt Peak	Spacewatch	·	1.6 km	MPC · JPL
99512	2002 EL_{20}	—	March 9, 2002	Socorro	LINEAR	·	1.5 km	MPC · JPL
99513	2002 EA_{26}	—	March 10, 2002	Anderson Mesa	LONEOS	·	1.6 km	MPC · JPL
99514	2002 EL_{26}	—	March 10, 2002	Anderson Mesa	LONEOS	·	2.2 km	MPC · JPL
99515	2002 EE_{30}	—	March 9, 2002	Socorro	LINEAR	·	1.8 km	MPC · JPL
99516	2002 EM_{30}	—	March 9, 2002	Socorro	LINEAR	·	2.4 km	MPC · JPL
99517	2002 ER_{30}	—	March 9, 2002	Socorro	LINEAR	NYS	2.6 km	MPC · JPL
99518	2002 EV_{30}	—	March 9, 2002	Socorro	LINEAR	·	2.6 km	MPC · JPL
99519	2002 EP_{31}	—	March 10, 2002	Socorro	LINEAR	·	5.0 km	MPC · JPL
99520	2002 ER_{32}	—	March 11, 2002	Palomar	NEAT	·	2.7 km	MPC · JPL
99521	2002 EB_{34}	—	March 11, 2002	Palomar	NEAT	EUN	2.6 km	MPC · JPL
99522	2002 EF_{41}	—	March 11, 2002	Socorro	LINEAR	V	1.7 km	MPC · JPL
99523	2002 EC_{66}	—	March 13, 2002	Socorro	LINEAR	·	6.0 km	MPC · JPL
99524	2002 EO_{70}	—	March 13, 2002	Socorro	LINEAR	·	1.6 km	MPC · JPL
99525	2002 EW_{70}	—	March 13, 2002	Socorro	LINEAR	·	1.6 km	MPC · JPL
99526	2002 EC_{73}	—	March 13, 2002	Socorro	LINEAR	·	1.5 km	MPC · JPL
99527	2002 EK_{74}	—	March 13, 2002	Socorro	LINEAR	·	2.6 km	MPC · JPL
99528	2002 ES_{78}	—	March 15, 2002	Kitt Peak	Spacewatch	slow	7.2 km	MPC · JPL
99529	2002 EJ_{86}	—	March 9, 2002	Socorro	LINEAR	·	2.0 km	MPC · JPL
99530	2002 EN_{86}	—	March 9, 2002	Socorro	LINEAR	·	2.1 km	MPC · JPL
99531	2002 EM_{88}	—	March 9, 2002	Socorro	LINEAR	·	1.9 km	MPC · JPL
99532	2002 EV_{88}	—	March 9, 2002	Socorro	LINEAR	·	5.5 km	MPC · JPL
99533	2002 EB_{89}	—	March 9, 2002	Socorro	LINEAR	·	2.0 km	MPC · JPL
99534	2002 EK_{91}	—	March 12, 2002	Socorro	LINEAR	·	2.2 km	MPC · JPL
99535	2002 EM_{91}	—	March 12, 2002	Socorro	LINEAR	·	1.8 km	MPC · JPL
99536	2002 EK_{92}	—	March 13, 2002	Socorro	LINEAR	·	2.8 km	MPC · JPL
99537	2002 EE_{97}	—	March 11, 2002	Socorro	LINEAR	·	1.5 km	MPC · JPL
99538	2002 EK_{97}	—	March 12, 2002	Socorro	LINEAR	·	2.2 km	MPC · JPL
99539	2002 ES_{97}	—	March 12, 2002	Socorro	LINEAR	·	1.5 km	MPC · JPL
99540	2002 EA_{98}	—	March 12, 2002	Socorro	LINEAR	(2076)	3.1 km	MPC · JPL
99541	2002 EG_{98}	—	March 13, 2002	Socorro	LINEAR	·	1.8 km	MPC · JPL
99542	2002 ED_{99}	—	March 15, 2002	Socorro	LINEAR	·	1.5 km	MPC · JPL
99543	2002 EO_{99}	—	March 2, 2002	Palomar	NEAT	·	1.7 km	MPC · JPL
99544	2002 EE_{100}	—	March 5, 2002	Anderson Mesa	LONEOS	V	1.6 km	MPC · JPL
99545	2002 EM_{103}	—	March 9, 2002	Anderson Mesa	LONEOS	·	2.6 km	MPC · JPL
99546	2002 EB_{104}	—	March 9, 2002	Anderson Mesa	LONEOS	·	3.3 km	MPC · JPL
99547	2002 EA_{106}	—	March 9, 2002	Anderson Mesa	LONEOS	·	1.4 km	MPC · JPL
99548	2002 EV_{107}	—	March 10, 2002	Haleakala	NEAT	·	3.0 km	MPC · JPL
99549	2002 EE_{119}	—	March 10, 2002	Palomar	NEAT	·	3.5 km	MPC · JPL
99550	2002 EJ_{128}	—	March 12, 2002	Socorro	LINEAR	·	2.3 km	MPC · JPL
99551	2002 ED_{129}	—	March 13, 2002	Socorro	LINEAR	·	2.3 km	MPC · JPL
99552	2002 EQ_{129}	—	March 13, 2002	Palomar	NEAT	·	1.5 km	MPC · JPL
99553	2002 EV_{142}	—	March 12, 2002	Palomar	NEAT	·	5.0 km	MPC · JPL
99554	2002 EV_{143}	—	March 13, 2002	Socorro	LINEAR	(5)	2.8 km	MPC · JPL
99555	2002 ES_{145}	—	March 13, 2002	Socorro	LINEAR	·	2.1 km	MPC · JPL
99556	2002 EY_{145}	—	March 13, 2002	Palomar	NEAT	·	1.9 km	MPC · JPL
99557	2002 EE_{146}	—	March 14, 2002	Socorro	LINEAR	·	3.6 km	MPC · JPL
99558	2002 EW_{146}	—	March 14, 2002	Palomar	NEAT	·	3.1 km	MPC · JPL
99559	2002 FL_{1}	—	March 19, 2002	Fountain Hills	Hills, Fountain	PHO	2.3 km	MPC · JPL
99560	2002 FD_{2}	—	March 19, 2002	Desert Eagle	W. K. Y. Yeung	·	2.9 km	MPC · JPL
99561	2002 FJ_{4}	—	March 20, 2002	Desert Eagle	W. K. Y. Yeung	·	2.2 km	MPC · JPL
99562	2002 FN_{5}	—	March 16, 2002	Farpoint	G. Hug	·	1.6 km	MPC · JPL
99563	2002 FL_{8}	—	March 16, 2002	Socorro	LINEAR	·	2.3 km	MPC · JPL
99564	2002 FT_{8}	—	March 16, 2002	Socorro	LINEAR	·	2.2 km	MPC · JPL
99565	2002 FF_{10}	—	March 16, 2002	Socorro	LINEAR	PHO	3.1 km	MPC · JPL
99566	2002 FT_{11}	—	March 16, 2002	Haleakala	NEAT	·	2.0 km	MPC · JPL
99567	2002 FW_{12}	—	March 16, 2002	Socorro	LINEAR	·	1.9 km	MPC · JPL
99568	2002 FB_{13}	—	March 16, 2002	Socorro	LINEAR	NYS ·	6.2 km	MPC · JPL
99569	2002 FK_{13}	—	March 16, 2002	Socorro	LINEAR	·	1.4 km	MPC · JPL
99570	2002 FS_{14}	—	March 16, 2002	Socorro	LINEAR	EUN	2.0 km	MPC · JPL
99571	2002 FJ_{16}	—	March 16, 2002	Haleakala	NEAT	·	2.5 km	MPC · JPL
99572	2002 FK_{16}	—	March 16, 2002	Haleakala	NEAT	·	1.9 km	MPC · JPL
99573	2002 FC_{22}	—	March 19, 2002	Socorro	LINEAR	·	3.7 km	MPC · JPL
99574	2002 FQ_{22}	—	March 19, 2002	Socorro	LINEAR	·	3.2 km	MPC · JPL
99575	2002 FE_{25}	—	March 19, 2002	Palomar	NEAT	·	4.2 km	MPC · JPL
99576	2002 FF_{26}	—	March 19, 2002	Palomar	NEAT	MAR	2.4 km	MPC · JPL
99577	2002 FE_{33}	—	March 20, 2002	Socorro	LINEAR	·	5.5 km	MPC · JPL
99578	2002 FP_{33}	—	March 20, 2002	Socorro	LINEAR	V	1.5 km	MPC · JPL
99579	2002 FV_{33}	—	March 20, 2002	Anderson Mesa	LONEOS	·	3.0 km	MPC · JPL
99580	2002 FM_{35}	—	March 21, 2002	Anderson Mesa	LONEOS	·	1.7 km	MPC · JPL
99581 Egal	2002 FQ_{35}	Egal	March 21, 2002	Anderson Mesa	LONEOS	·	7.7 km	MPC · JPL
99582	2002 FX_{37}	—	March 31, 2002	Palomar	NEAT	·	3.4 km	MPC · JPL
99583	2002 GD_{3}	—	April 7, 2002	Essen	Essen	·	3.8 km	MPC · JPL
99584	2002 GR_{7}	—	April 14, 2002	Desert Eagle	W. K. Y. Yeung	·	1.6 km	MPC · JPL
99585	2002 GA_{8}	—	April 14, 2002	Desert Eagle	W. K. Y. Yeung	V	1.5 km	MPC · JPL
99586	2002 GZ_{11}	—	April 15, 2002	Desert Eagle	W. K. Y. Yeung	·	4.8 km	MPC · JPL
99587	2002 GY_{15}	—	April 15, 2002	Socorro	LINEAR	·	2.9 km	MPC · JPL
99588	2002 GH_{17}	—	April 15, 2002	Socorro	LINEAR	·	4.8 km	MPC · JPL
99589	2002 GH_{19}	—	April 14, 2002	Socorro	LINEAR	·	1.6 km	MPC · JPL
99590	2002 GG_{21}	—	April 14, 2002	Socorro	LINEAR	NYS	2.4 km	MPC · JPL
99591	2002 GH_{21}	—	April 14, 2002	Socorro	LINEAR	·	5.0 km	MPC · JPL
99592	2002 GM_{21}	—	April 14, 2002	Socorro	LINEAR	·	1.7 km	MPC · JPL
99593	2002 GY_{21}	—	April 14, 2002	Socorro	LINEAR	·	2.0 km	MPC · JPL
99594	2002 GH_{23}	—	April 15, 2002	Palomar	NEAT	·	1.6 km	MPC · JPL
99595	2002 GW_{23}	—	April 15, 2002	Palomar	NEAT	MAS	1.3 km	MPC · JPL
99596	2002 GG_{24}	—	April 14, 2002	Ametlla de Mar	J. Nomen	·	2.2 km	MPC · JPL
99597	2002 GD_{26}	—	April 14, 2002	Socorro	LINEAR	·	1.2 km	MPC · JPL
99598	2002 GG_{37}	—	April 2, 2002	Palomar	NEAT	·	1.3 km	MPC · JPL
99599	2002 GX_{41}	—	April 4, 2002	Palomar	NEAT	·	1.2 km	MPC · JPL
99600	2002 GM_{42}	—	April 4, 2002	Palomar	NEAT	THM	5.1 km	MPC · JPL

== 99601–99700 ==
back to top

Designation			Discovery			Properties		Ref
Permanent	Provisional	Named after	Date	Site	Discoverer(s)	Category	Diam.	Ref
99601	2002 GW_{45}	—	April 4, 2002	Palomar	NEAT	V	1.4 km	MPC · JPL
99602	2002 GE_{46}	—	April 2, 2002	Palomar	NEAT	·	2.9 km	MPC · JPL
99603	2002 GM_{46}	—	April 2, 2002	Palomar	NEAT	·	4.8 km	MPC · JPL
99604	2002 GZ_{49}	—	April 5, 2002	Palomar	NEAT	·	3.7 km	MPC · JPL
99605	2002 GR_{51}	—	April 5, 2002	Palomar	NEAT	·	1.9 km	MPC · JPL
99606	2002 GZ_{52}	—	April 5, 2002	Anderson Mesa	LONEOS	·	2.2 km	MPC · JPL
99607	2002 GO_{53}	—	April 5, 2002	Palomar	NEAT	·	3.2 km	MPC · JPL
99608	2002 GN_{54}	—	April 5, 2002	Palomar	NEAT	·	5.3 km	MPC · JPL
99609	2002 GQ_{57}	—	April 8, 2002	Palomar	NEAT	·	4.2 km	MPC · JPL
99610	2002 GS_{66}	—	April 8, 2002	Palomar	NEAT	·	2.8 km	MPC · JPL
99611	2002 GL_{68}	—	April 8, 2002	Socorro	LINEAR	NAE	6.1 km	MPC · JPL
99612	2002 GN_{71}	—	April 9, 2002	Anderson Mesa	LONEOS	·	2.2 km	MPC · JPL
99613	2002 GV_{71}	—	April 9, 2002	Anderson Mesa	LONEOS	·	3.9 km	MPC · JPL
99614	2002 GW_{71}	—	April 9, 2002	Anderson Mesa	LONEOS	·	6.5 km	MPC · JPL
99615	2002 GW_{76}	—	April 9, 2002	Anderson Mesa	LONEOS	·	1.4 km	MPC · JPL
99616	2002 GX_{79}	—	April 10, 2002	Socorro	LINEAR	·	2.0 km	MPC · JPL
99617	2002 GF_{82}	—	April 10, 2002	Socorro	LINEAR	·	6.4 km	MPC · JPL
99618	2002 GO_{82}	—	April 10, 2002	Socorro	LINEAR	·	4.0 km	MPC · JPL
99619	2002 GD_{84}	—	April 10, 2002	Socorro	LINEAR	·	2.1 km	MPC · JPL
99620	2002 GP_{85}	—	April 10, 2002	Socorro	LINEAR	·	2.0 km	MPC · JPL
99621	2002 GT_{86}	—	April 10, 2002	Socorro	LINEAR	V	1.3 km	MPC · JPL
99622	2002 GD_{88}	—	April 10, 2002	Socorro	LINEAR	(5)	2.9 km	MPC · JPL
99623	2002 GZ_{88}	—	April 10, 2002	Socorro	LINEAR	·	4.6 km	MPC · JPL
99624	2002 GB_{89}	—	April 10, 2002	Socorro	LINEAR	V	1.3 km	MPC · JPL
99625	2002 GJ_{91}	—	April 9, 2002	Kitt Peak	Spacewatch	·	2.3 km	MPC · JPL
99626	2002 GT_{91}	—	April 9, 2002	Anderson Mesa	LONEOS	·	2.7 km	MPC · JPL
99627	2002 GK_{93}	—	April 9, 2002	Socorro	LINEAR	·	3.8 km	MPC · JPL
99628	2002 GD_{95}	—	April 9, 2002	Socorro	LINEAR	·	1.7 km	MPC · JPL
99629	2002 GR_{96}	—	April 9, 2002	Socorro	LINEAR	·	1.7 km	MPC · JPL
99630	2002 GB_{99}	—	April 10, 2002	Socorro	LINEAR	·	1.2 km	MPC · JPL
99631	2002 GG_{102}	—	April 10, 2002	Socorro	LINEAR	·	5.6 km	MPC · JPL
99632	2002 GT_{103}	—	April 10, 2002	Socorro	LINEAR	·	1.6 km	MPC · JPL
99633	2002 GV_{103}	—	April 10, 2002	Socorro	LINEAR	·	2.5 km	MPC · JPL
99634	2002 GN_{105}	—	April 11, 2002	Anderson Mesa	LONEOS	V	1.2 km	MPC · JPL
99635	2002 GT_{106}	—	April 11, 2002	Anderson Mesa	LONEOS	·	7.2 km	MPC · JPL
99636	2002 GF_{107}	—	April 11, 2002	Socorro	LINEAR	·	2.5 km	MPC · JPL
99637	2002 GY_{107}	—	April 11, 2002	Socorro	LINEAR	V	1.7 km	MPC · JPL
99638	2002 GV_{109}	—	April 11, 2002	Palomar	NEAT	·	2.8 km	MPC · JPL
99639	2002 GE_{131}	—	April 12, 2002	Socorro	LINEAR	THM	5.8 km	MPC · JPL
99640	2002 GU_{140}	—	April 13, 2002	Palomar	NEAT	DOR	4.6 km	MPC · JPL
99641	2002 GN_{142}	—	April 13, 2002	Palomar	NEAT	·	3.4 km	MPC · JPL
99642	2002 GM_{151}	—	April 14, 2002	Palomar	NEAT	·	1.3 km	MPC · JPL
99643	2002 GE_{158}	—	April 13, 2002	Palomar	NEAT	V	1.1 km	MPC · JPL
99644	2002 GF_{159}	—	April 14, 2002	Socorro	LINEAR	·	4.3 km	MPC · JPL
99645	2002 GE_{165}	—	April 14, 2002	Palomar	NEAT	·	2.9 km	MPC · JPL
99646	2002 GE_{170}	—	April 9, 2002	Socorro	LINEAR	·	1.8 km	MPC · JPL
99647	2002 GC_{178}	—	April 8, 2002	Palomar	NEAT	·	2.4 km	MPC · JPL
99648	2002 HR	—	April 16, 2002	Desert Eagle	W. K. Y. Yeung	·	2.2 km	MPC · JPL
99649	2002 HG_{1}	—	April 16, 2002	Socorro	LINEAR	·	2.9 km	MPC · JPL
99650	2002 HF_{2}	—	April 16, 2002	Socorro	LINEAR	·	1.8 km	MPC · JPL
99651	2002 HB_{4}	—	April 16, 2002	Socorro	LINEAR	·	3.2 km	MPC · JPL
99652	2002 HD_{4}	—	April 16, 2002	Socorro	LINEAR	·	10 km	MPC · JPL
99653	2002 HO_{4}	—	April 16, 2002	Socorro	LINEAR	·	4.1 km	MPC · JPL
99654	2002 HP_{4}	—	April 16, 2002	Socorro	LINEAR	·	4.0 km	MPC · JPL
99655	2002 HL_{6}	—	April 18, 2002	Palomar	NEAT	·	1.3 km	MPC · JPL
99656	2002 HD_{9}	—	April 16, 2002	Socorro	LINEAR	V	1.5 km	MPC · JPL
99657	2002 HG_{9}	—	April 16, 2002	Socorro	LINEAR	·	2.9 km	MPC · JPL
99658	2002 HV_{9}	—	April 17, 2002	Socorro	LINEAR	WIT	1.8 km	MPC · JPL
99659	2002 HW_{11}	—	April 29, 2002	Palomar	NEAT	·	2.5 km	MPC · JPL
99660	2002 HY_{11}	—	April 29, 2002	Palomar	NEAT	·	2.2 km	MPC · JPL
99661	2002 HL_{13}	—	April 22, 2002	Socorro	LINEAR	·	7.6 km	MPC · JPL
99662	2002 HS_{13}	—	April 21, 2002	Socorro	LINEAR	·	4.8 km	MPC · JPL
99663	2002 HS_{15}	—	April 17, 2002	Socorro	LINEAR	·	2.6 km	MPC · JPL
99664	2002 HK_{16}	—	April 18, 2002	Kitt Peak	Spacewatch	(5)	2.5 km	MPC · JPL
99665	2002 HW_{16}	—	April 18, 2002	Haleakala	NEAT	DOR	6.7 km	MPC · JPL
99666	2002 HQ_{17}	—	April 30, 2002	Palomar	NEAT	·	4.2 km	MPC · JPL
99667	2002 JO_{1}	—	May 3, 2002	Desert Eagle	W. K. Y. Yeung	·	3.9 km	MPC · JPL
99668	2002 JW_{4}	—	May 5, 2002	Desert Eagle	W. K. Y. Yeung	·	1.9 km	MPC · JPL
99669	2002 JE_{5}	—	May 5, 2002	Desert Eagle	W. K. Y. Yeung	·	5.9 km	MPC · JPL
99670	2002 JK_{6}	—	May 6, 2002	Kitt Peak	Spacewatch	·	3.2 km	MPC · JPL
99671	2002 JE_{7}	—	May 3, 2002	Palomar	NEAT	·	4.3 km	MPC · JPL
99672	2002 JA_{8}	—	May 6, 2002	Palomar	NEAT	·	4.5 km	MPC · JPL
99673	2002 JP_{9}	—	May 6, 2002	Desert Eagle	W. K. Y. Yeung	·	2.6 km	MPC · JPL
99674	2002 JN_{11}	—	May 4, 2002	Anderson Mesa	LONEOS	EOS	4.1 km	MPC · JPL
99675	2002 JM_{12}	—	May 5, 2002	Desert Eagle	W. K. Y. Yeung	·	2.1 km	MPC · JPL
99676	2002 JR_{12}	—	May 6, 2002	Desert Eagle	W. K. Y. Yeung	·	4.4 km	MPC · JPL
99677	2002 JC_{15}	—	May 8, 2002	Socorro	LINEAR	·	4.0 km	MPC · JPL
99678	2002 JH_{15}	—	May 8, 2002	Socorro	LINEAR	·	4.8 km	MPC · JPL
99679	2002 JK_{15}	—	May 8, 2002	Socorro	LINEAR	V	1.3 km	MPC · JPL
99680	2002 JS_{16}	—	May 6, 2002	Palomar	NEAT	·	2.8 km	MPC · JPL
99681	2002 JU_{18}	—	May 7, 2002	Palomar	NEAT	·	5.5 km	MPC · JPL
99682	2002 JL_{20}	—	May 7, 2002	Palomar	NEAT	·	1.9 km	MPC · JPL
99683	2002 JX_{20}	—	May 8, 2002	Haleakala	NEAT	·	6.3 km	MPC · JPL
99684	2002 JZ_{20}	—	May 8, 2002	Haleakala	NEAT	EOS	3.9 km	MPC · JPL
99685	2002 JH_{21}	—	May 8, 2002	Haleakala	NEAT	MAS	1.3 km	MPC · JPL
99686	2002 JO_{22}	—	May 8, 2002	Socorro	LINEAR	(11097)	8.0 km	MPC · JPL
99687	2002 JY_{23}	—	May 8, 2002	Socorro	LINEAR	·	2.6 km	MPC · JPL
99688	2002 JR_{24}	—	May 8, 2002	Socorro	LINEAR	·	4.2 km	MPC · JPL
99689	2002 JB_{26}	—	May 8, 2002	Socorro	LINEAR	·	2.6 km	MPC · JPL
99690	2002 JL_{26}	—	May 8, 2002	Socorro	LINEAR	·	2.2 km	MPC · JPL
99691	2002 JP_{27}	—	May 8, 2002	Socorro	LINEAR	CLA	2.6 km	MPC · JPL
99692	2002 JS_{27}	—	May 8, 2002	Socorro	LINEAR	·	2.5 km	MPC · JPL
99693	2002 JV_{27}	—	May 9, 2002	Socorro	LINEAR	EOS	3.7 km	MPC · JPL
99694	2002 JR_{29}	—	May 9, 2002	Socorro	LINEAR	V	1.3 km	MPC · JPL
99695	2002 JS_{29}	—	May 9, 2002	Socorro	LINEAR	·	2.6 km	MPC · JPL
99696	2002 JC_{30}	—	May 9, 2002	Socorro	LINEAR	·	5.2 km	MPC · JPL
99697	2002 JX_{31}	—	May 9, 2002	Socorro	LINEAR	MAS	1.5 km	MPC · JPL
99698	2002 JY_{31}	—	May 9, 2002	Socorro	LINEAR	·	3.3 km	MPC · JPL
99699	2002 JD_{34}	—	May 9, 2002	Socorro	LINEAR	EOS	3.9 km	MPC · JPL
99700	2002 JN_{34}	—	May 9, 2002	Socorro	LINEAR	·	2.6 km	MPC · JPL

== 99701–99800 ==
back to top

Designation			Discovery			Properties		Ref
Permanent	Provisional	Named after	Date	Site	Discoverer(s)	Category	Diam.	Ref
99701	2002 JW_{34}	—	May 9, 2002	Socorro	LINEAR	·	1.8 km	MPC · JPL
99702	2002 JN_{35}	—	May 9, 2002	Socorro	LINEAR	·	1.7 km	MPC · JPL
99703	2002 JU_{35}	—	May 9, 2002	Socorro	LINEAR	·	4.9 km	MPC · JPL
99704	2002 JX_{35}	—	May 9, 2002	Socorro	LINEAR	EOS	4.1 km	MPC · JPL
99705	2002 JY_{36}	—	May 7, 2002	Anderson Mesa	LONEOS	·	4.8 km	MPC · JPL
99706	2002 JC_{38}	—	May 8, 2002	Haleakala	NEAT	EOS	6.1 km	MPC · JPL
99707	2002 JY_{38}	—	May 9, 2002	Palomar	NEAT	EOS	4.6 km	MPC · JPL
99708	2002 JN_{39}	—	May 9, 2002	Desert Eagle	W. K. Y. Yeung	·	4.6 km	MPC · JPL
99709	2002 JW_{39}	—	May 10, 2002	Desert Eagle	W. K. Y. Yeung	·	11 km	MPC · JPL
99710	2002 JX_{39}	—	May 10, 2002	Desert Eagle	W. K. Y. Yeung	·	1.7 km	MPC · JPL
99711	2002 JK_{40}	—	May 8, 2002	Socorro	LINEAR	V	1.9 km	MPC · JPL
99712	2002 JR_{40}	—	May 8, 2002	Socorro	LINEAR	NYS	2.3 km	MPC · JPL
99713	2002 JS_{40}	—	May 8, 2002	Socorro	LINEAR	·	2.4 km	MPC · JPL
99714	2002 JQ_{41}	—	May 8, 2002	Socorro	LINEAR	·	2.4 km	MPC · JPL
99715	2002 JY_{41}	—	May 8, 2002	Socorro	LINEAR	·	6.8 km	MPC · JPL
99716	2002 JU_{42}	—	May 8, 2002	Socorro	LINEAR	·	2.5 km	MPC · JPL
99717	2002 JS_{43}	—	May 9, 2002	Socorro	LINEAR	·	2.5 km	MPC · JPL
99718	2002 JV_{43}	—	May 9, 2002	Socorro	LINEAR	EUN	2.3 km	MPC · JPL
99719	2002 JA_{44}	—	May 9, 2002	Socorro	LINEAR	·	2.5 km	MPC · JPL
99720	2002 JK_{45}	—	May 9, 2002	Socorro	LINEAR	·	2.3 km	MPC · JPL
99721	2002 JN_{45}	—	May 9, 2002	Socorro	LINEAR	·	1.9 km	MPC · JPL
99722	2002 JW_{46}	—	May 9, 2002	Socorro	LINEAR	·	2.5 km	MPC · JPL
99723	2002 JA_{47}	—	May 9, 2002	Socorro	LINEAR	·	7.5 km	MPC · JPL
99724	2002 JM_{48}	—	May 9, 2002	Socorro	LINEAR	EOS	4.4 km	MPC · JPL
99725	2002 JK_{49}	—	May 9, 2002	Socorro	LINEAR	·	1.9 km	MPC · JPL
99726	2002 JZ_{50}	—	May 9, 2002	Socorro	LINEAR	NYS	1.9 km	MPC · JPL
99727	2002 JW_{52}	—	May 9, 2002	Socorro	LINEAR	·	1.2 km	MPC · JPL
99728	2002 JX_{54}	—	May 9, 2002	Socorro	LINEAR	MAS	1.5 km	MPC · JPL
99729	2002 JQ_{55}	—	May 9, 2002	Socorro	LINEAR	NYS	1.9 km	MPC · JPL
99730	2002 JL_{57}	—	May 9, 2002	Socorro	LINEAR	·	5.0 km	MPC · JPL
99731	2002 JM_{57}	—	May 9, 2002	Socorro	LINEAR	·	2.4 km	MPC · JPL
99732	2002 JN_{57}	—	May 9, 2002	Socorro	LINEAR	·	4.5 km	MPC · JPL
99733	2002 JB_{58}	—	May 9, 2002	Socorro	LINEAR	KOR	3.0 km	MPC · JPL
99734	2002 JN_{61}	—	May 8, 2002	Socorro	LINEAR	·	3.9 km	MPC · JPL
99735	2002 JT_{61}	—	May 8, 2002	Socorro	LINEAR	V	1.6 km	MPC · JPL
99736	2002 JW_{61}	—	May 8, 2002	Socorro	LINEAR	·	1.7 km	MPC · JPL
99737	2002 JQ_{63}	—	May 9, 2002	Socorro	LINEAR	NYS	2.0 km	MPC · JPL
99738	2002 JN_{64}	—	May 9, 2002	Socorro	LINEAR	·	6.3 km	MPC · JPL
99739	2002 JT_{64}	—	May 9, 2002	Socorro	LINEAR	·	2.4 km	MPC · JPL
99740	2002 JO_{65}	—	May 9, 2002	Socorro	LINEAR	·	2.2 km	MPC · JPL
99741	2002 JX_{66}	—	May 10, 2002	Socorro	LINEAR	NYS	1.7 km	MPC · JPL
99742	2002 JY_{68}	—	May 7, 2002	Socorro	LINEAR	·	1.6 km	MPC · JPL
99743	2002 JP_{69}	—	May 7, 2002	Socorro	LINEAR	·	1.5 km	MPC · JPL
99744	2002 JZ_{69}	—	May 7, 2002	Socorro	LINEAR	EUN	2.2 km	MPC · JPL
99745	2002 JK_{71}	—	May 8, 2002	Socorro	LINEAR	·	1.6 km	MPC · JPL
99746	2002 JJ_{73}	—	May 8, 2002	Socorro	LINEAR	·	4.4 km	MPC · JPL
99747	2002 JK_{74}	—	May 9, 2002	Socorro	LINEAR	·	5.7 km	MPC · JPL
99748	2002 JP_{77}	—	May 11, 2002	Socorro	LINEAR	MAS	1.3 km	MPC · JPL
99749	2002 JF_{79}	—	May 11, 2002	Socorro	LINEAR	·	3.9 km	MPC · JPL
99750	2002 JC_{83}	—	May 11, 2002	Socorro	LINEAR	·	1.6 km	MPC · JPL
99751	2002 JG_{83}	—	May 11, 2002	Socorro	LINEAR	·	4.4 km	MPC · JPL
99752	2002 JK_{84}	—	May 11, 2002	Socorro	LINEAR	NEM	4.7 km	MPC · JPL
99753	2002 JC_{85}	—	May 11, 2002	Socorro	LINEAR	·	3.8 km	MPC · JPL
99754	2002 JV_{88}	—	May 11, 2002	Socorro	LINEAR	·	2.5 km	MPC · JPL
99755	2002 JZ_{88}	—	May 11, 2002	Socorro	LINEAR	·	2.6 km	MPC · JPL
99756	2002 JH_{90}	—	May 11, 2002	Socorro	LINEAR	·	1.9 km	MPC · JPL
99757	2002 JK_{90}	—	May 11, 2002	Socorro	LINEAR	·	1.7 km	MPC · JPL
99758	2002 JN_{90}	—	May 11, 2002	Socorro	LINEAR	·	4.7 km	MPC · JPL
99759	2002 JY_{99}	—	May 8, 2002	Socorro	LINEAR	·	2.6 km	MPC · JPL
99760	2002 JN_{100}	—	May 15, 2002	Fountain Hills	Hills, Fountain	EUN	5.6 km	MPC · JPL
99761	2002 JK_{101}	—	May 15, 2002	Socorro	LINEAR	·	1.9 km	MPC · JPL
99762	2002 JF_{102}	—	May 9, 2002	Socorro	LINEAR	·	2.5 km	MPC · JPL
99763	2002 JG_{102}	—	May 9, 2002	Socorro	LINEAR	MAS	1.8 km	MPC · JPL
99764	2002 JK_{102}	—	May 9, 2002	Socorro	LINEAR	KOR	3.0 km	MPC · JPL
99765	2002 JZ_{102}	—	May 9, 2002	Socorro	LINEAR	·	2.0 km	MPC · JPL
99766	2002 JC_{103}	—	May 9, 2002	Socorro	LINEAR	KOR	2.8 km	MPC · JPL
99767	2002 JP_{104}	—	May 11, 2002	Socorro	LINEAR	·	6.3 km	MPC · JPL
99768	2002 JW_{104}	—	May 11, 2002	Socorro	LINEAR	·	5.0 km	MPC · JPL
99769	2002 JD_{106}	—	May 14, 2002	Socorro	LINEAR	·	1.8 km	MPC · JPL
99770	2002 JU_{106}	—	May 11, 2002	Palomar	NEAT	·	6.5 km	MPC · JPL
99771	2002 JE_{110}	—	May 11, 2002	Socorro	LINEAR	·	2.1 km	MPC · JPL
99772	2002 JL_{110}	—	May 11, 2002	Socorro	LINEAR	·	1.6 km	MPC · JPL
99773	2002 JC_{112}	—	May 11, 2002	Socorro	LINEAR	·	2.9 km	MPC · JPL
99774	2002 JL_{112}	—	May 11, 2002	Socorro	LINEAR	·	2.8 km	MPC · JPL
99775	2002 JA_{113}	—	May 13, 2002	Palomar	NEAT	·	3.9 km	MPC · JPL
99776	2002 JP_{114}	—	May 13, 2002	Socorro	LINEAR	·	4.9 km	MPC · JPL
99777	2002 JR_{114}	—	May 13, 2002	Socorro	LINEAR	·	3.0 km	MPC · JPL
99778	2002 JC_{115}	—	May 13, 2002	Socorro	LINEAR	·	6.2 km	MPC · JPL
99779	2002 JN_{115}	—	May 15, 2002	Haleakala	NEAT	V	1.2 km	MPC · JPL
99780	2002 JM_{116}	—	May 3, 2002	Kitt Peak	Spacewatch	V	1.3 km	MPC · JPL
99781	2002 JY_{118}	—	May 5, 2002	Palomar	NEAT	·	2.3 km	MPC · JPL
99782	2002 JA_{121}	—	May 5, 2002	Palomar	NEAT	·	4.9 km	MPC · JPL
99783	2002 JE_{127}	—	May 7, 2002	Anderson Mesa	LONEOS	·	2.5 km	MPC · JPL
99784	2002 JT_{129}	—	May 8, 2002	Socorro	LINEAR	·	4.1 km	MPC · JPL
99785	2002 JU_{133}	—	May 9, 2002	Socorro	LINEAR	HYG	5.4 km	MPC · JPL
99786	2002 JD_{141}	—	May 10, 2002	Palomar	NEAT	·	3.2 km	MPC · JPL
99787	2002 JM_{146}	—	May 15, 2002	Haleakala	NEAT	V	1.2 km	MPC · JPL
99788	2002 KV_{1}	—	May 16, 2002	Socorro	LINEAR	KOR	2.9 km	MPC · JPL
99789	2002 KE_{2}	—	May 18, 2002	Palomar	NEAT	PHO	2.0 km	MPC · JPL
99790	2002 KS_{2}	—	May 18, 2002	Palomar	NEAT	·	950 m	MPC · JPL
99791	2002 KD_{4}	—	May 18, 2002	Palomar	NEAT	·	8.1 km	MPC · JPL
99792	2002 KN_{4}	—	May 16, 2002	Socorro	LINEAR	·	5.7 km	MPC · JPL
99793	2002 KO_{4}	—	May 16, 2002	Socorro	LINEAR	MAS	1.2 km	MPC · JPL
99794	2002 KS_{5}	—	May 16, 2002	Socorro	LINEAR	MAS	1.6 km	MPC · JPL
99795	2002 KM_{6}	—	May 19, 2002	Anderson Mesa	LONEOS	·	2.2 km	MPC · JPL
99796	2002 KL_{12}	—	May 17, 2002	Kitt Peak	Spacewatch	·	6.4 km	MPC · JPL
99797	2002 KJ_{13}	—	May 18, 2002	Palomar	NEAT	·	1.5 km	MPC · JPL
99798	2002 LT	—	June 2, 2002	Socorro	LINEAR	·	5.6 km	MPC · JPL
99799	2002 LJ_{3}	—	June 5, 2002	Haleakala	NEAT	AMO	700 m	MPC · JPL
99800	2002 LF_{7}	—	June 2, 2002	Palomar	NEAT	DOR	6.0 km	MPC · JPL

== 99801–99900 ==
back to top

Designation			Discovery			Properties		Ref
Permanent	Provisional	Named after	Date	Site	Discoverer(s)	Category	Diam.	Ref
99801	2002 LP_{10}	—	June 5, 2002	Socorro	LINEAR	·	5.0 km	MPC · JPL
99802	2002 LQ_{11}	—	June 5, 2002	Socorro	LINEAR	·	2.7 km	MPC · JPL
99803	2002 LL_{13}	—	June 6, 2002	Socorro	LINEAR	EOS	5.6 km	MPC · JPL
99804	2002 LL_{14}	—	June 6, 2002	Socorro	LINEAR	·	2.4 km	MPC · JPL
99805	2002 LY_{16}	—	June 6, 2002	Socorro	LINEAR	NYS ·	3.7 km	MPC · JPL
99806	2002 LN_{17}	—	June 6, 2002	Socorro	LINEAR	VER	6.3 km	MPC · JPL
99807	2002 LU_{18}	—	June 6, 2002	Socorro	LINEAR	·	4.6 km	MPC · JPL
99808	2002 LE_{20}	—	June 6, 2002	Socorro	LINEAR	·	2.1 km	MPC · JPL
99809	2002 LW_{20}	—	June 6, 2002	Socorro	LINEAR	GEF	2.6 km	MPC · JPL
99810	2002 LD_{22}	—	June 8, 2002	Socorro	LINEAR	·	5.3 km	MPC · JPL
99811	2002 LF_{25}	—	June 3, 2002	Socorro	LINEAR	MAR	2.6 km	MPC · JPL
99812	2002 LW_{31}	—	June 8, 2002	Socorro	LINEAR	slow	8.7 km	MPC · JPL
99813	2002 LT_{34}	—	June 8, 2002	Socorro	LINEAR	BRG	2.8 km	MPC · JPL
99814	2002 LS_{43}	—	June 10, 2002	Socorro	LINEAR	·	12 km	MPC · JPL
99815	2002 LR_{45}	—	June 6, 2002	Socorro	LINEAR	·	6.5 km	MPC · JPL
99816	2002 LH_{49}	—	June 5, 2002	Kitt Peak	Spacewatch	EOS	5.4 km	MPC · JPL
99817	2002 LP_{50}	—	June 7, 2002	Palomar	NEAT	·	2.2 km	MPC · JPL
99818	2002 LO_{51}	—	June 9, 2002	Socorro	LINEAR	·	2.2 km	MPC · JPL
99819	2002 LH_{52}	—	June 9, 2002	Socorro	LINEAR	·	2.5 km	MPC · JPL
99820	2002 LG_{56}	—	June 15, 2002	Socorro	LINEAR	PHO	2.8 km	MPC · JPL
99821	2002 LC_{57}	—	June 10, 2002	Palomar	NEAT	·	2.7 km	MPC · JPL
99822	2002 MA	—	June 16, 2002	Kitt Peak	Spacewatch	(1118)	7.8 km	MPC · JPL
99823	2002 ME_{2}	—	June 16, 2002	Palomar	NEAT	URS	6.4 km	MPC · JPL
99824 Polnareff	2002 MN_{3}	Polnareff	June 29, 2002	Vicques	M. Ory	·	2.6 km	MPC · JPL
99825 Nosworthy	2002 NK_{7}	Nosworthy	July 12, 2002	Reedy Creek	J. Broughton	·	8.5 km	MPC · JPL
99826	2002 NJ_{8}	—	July 9, 2002	Socorro	LINEAR	·	7.8 km	MPC · JPL
99827	2002 NR_{9}	—	July 3, 2002	Palomar	NEAT	·	4.3 km	MPC · JPL
99828	2002 NS_{9}	—	July 3, 2002	Palomar	NEAT	·	2.3 km	MPC · JPL
99829	2002 NV_{9}	—	July 3, 2002	Palomar	NEAT	HYG	6.4 km	MPC · JPL
99830	2002 NQ_{10}	—	July 4, 2002	Palomar	NEAT	·	5.0 km	MPC · JPL
99831	2002 NH_{11}	—	July 4, 2002	Palomar	NEAT	MRX	2.1 km	MPC · JPL
99832	2002 NL_{14}	—	July 4, 2002	Palomar	NEAT	·	2.3 km	MPC · JPL
99833	2002 NY_{18}	—	July 9, 2002	Socorro	LINEAR	·	8.3 km	MPC · JPL
99834	2002 NX_{19}	—	July 9, 2002	Socorro	LINEAR	·	3.2 km	MPC · JPL
99835	2002 NQ_{20}	—	July 9, 2002	Socorro	LINEAR	EUN	2.6 km	MPC · JPL
99836	2002 NW_{20}	—	July 9, 2002	Socorro	LINEAR	EOS	4.0 km	MPC · JPL
99837	2002 NJ_{21}	—	July 9, 2002	Socorro	LINEAR	·	5.5 km	MPC · JPL
99838	2002 NX_{23}	—	July 9, 2002	Socorro	LINEAR	·	4.8 km	MPC · JPL
99839	2002 NF_{25}	—	July 9, 2002	Socorro	LINEAR	EOS	5.1 km	MPC · JPL
99840	2002 NN_{28}	—	July 12, 2002	Palomar	NEAT	·	5.0 km	MPC · JPL
99841	2002 NX_{32}	—	July 13, 2002	Socorro	LINEAR	·	8.1 km	MPC · JPL
99842	2002 NT_{33}	—	July 13, 2002	Palomar	NEAT	·	9.1 km	MPC · JPL
99843	2002 NT_{34}	—	July 9, 2002	Socorro	LINEAR	VER	8.6 km	MPC · JPL
99844	2002 NR_{41}	—	July 14, 2002	Palomar	NEAT	·	7.6 km	MPC · JPL
99845	2002 NP_{42}	—	July 15, 2002	Palomar	NEAT	EUN	2.9 km	MPC · JPL
99846	2002 NK_{45}	—	July 13, 2002	Palomar	NEAT	·	2.4 km	MPC · JPL
99847	2002 NV_{46}	—	July 13, 2002	Haleakala	NEAT	·	3.1 km	MPC · JPL
99848	2002 NY_{49}	—	July 13, 2002	Haleakala	NEAT	THM	5.4 km	MPC · JPL
99849	2002 NP_{51}	—	July 5, 2002	Socorro	LINEAR	MAR	3.6 km	MPC · JPL
99850	2002 NS_{52}	—	July 14, 2002	Palomar	NEAT	3:2 · SHU	13 km	MPC · JPL
99851	2002 OA_{3}	—	July 17, 2002	Socorro	LINEAR	·	9.4 km	MPC · JPL
99852	2002 OL_{8}	—	July 19, 2002	Palomar	NEAT	·	6.2 km	MPC · JPL
99853	2002 OG_{9}	—	July 21, 2002	Palomar	NEAT	DOR	4.7 km	MPC · JPL
99854	2002 OD_{10}	—	July 21, 2002	Palomar	NEAT	·	7.1 km	MPC · JPL
99855	2002 OG_{10}	—	July 21, 2002	Palomar	NEAT	EOS	3.6 km	MPC · JPL
99856	2002 OS_{11}	—	July 18, 2002	Socorro	LINEAR	EUN	2.3 km	MPC · JPL
99857	2002 OU_{15}	—	July 18, 2002	Socorro	LINEAR	·	5.5 km	MPC · JPL
99858	2002 OX_{20}	—	July 22, 2002	Palomar	NEAT	EUN	2.5 km	MPC · JPL
99859	2002 OG_{21}	—	July 22, 2002	Palomar	NEAT	·	8.6 km	MPC · JPL
99860	2002 OL_{21}	—	July 23, 2002	Palomar	NEAT	·	1.6 km	MPC · JPL
99861 Tscharnuter	2002 OV_{24}	Tscharnuter	July 29, 2002	Palomar	S. F. Hönig	KOR	2.9 km	MPC · JPL
99862 Kenlevin	2002 OD_{25}	Kenlevin	July 23, 2002	Palomar	S. F. Hönig	T_{j} (2.97) · HIL · 3:2 · (6124)	7.3 km	MPC · JPL
99863 Winnewisser	2002 OV_{25}	Winnewisser	July 23, 2002	Palomar	NEAT	KOR	2.3 km	MPC · JPL
99864	2002 OF_{26}	—	July 23, 2002	Palomar	NEAT	·	6.1 km	MPC · JPL
99865	2002 PN_{20}	—	August 6, 2002	Palomar	NEAT	·	8.2 km	MPC · JPL
99866	2002 PX_{22}	—	August 6, 2002	Palomar	NEAT	·	4.8 km	MPC · JPL
99867	2002 PE_{24}	—	August 6, 2002	Palomar	NEAT	·	3.6 km	MPC · JPL
99868	2002 PD_{30}	—	August 6, 2002	Palomar	NEAT	EOS	4.6 km	MPC · JPL
99869	2002 PF_{46}	—	August 9, 2002	Socorro	LINEAR	·	3.3 km	MPC · JPL
99870	2002 PZ_{47}	—	August 10, 2002	Socorro	LINEAR	·	7.9 km	MPC · JPL
99871	2002 PB_{53}	—	August 8, 2002	Palomar	NEAT	·	3.7 km	MPC · JPL
99872	2002 PL_{53}	—	August 8, 2002	Palomar	NEAT	·	4.0 km	MPC · JPL
99873	2002 PA_{54}	—	August 8, 2002	Palomar	NEAT	·	7.1 km	MPC · JPL
99874	2002 PU_{70}	—	August 11, 2002	Socorro	LINEAR	·	4.3 km	MPC · JPL
99875	2002 PE_{72}	—	August 12, 2002	Socorro	LINEAR	(10654)	8.4 km	MPC · JPL
99876	2002 PB_{74}	—	August 12, 2002	Socorro	LINEAR	·	9.6 km	MPC · JPL
99877	2002 PB_{78}	—	August 11, 2002	Palomar	NEAT	T_{j} (2.94) · 3:2	15 km	MPC · JPL
99878	2002 PW_{83}	—	August 10, 2002	Socorro	LINEAR	·	4.4 km	MPC · JPL
99879	2002 PO_{85}	—	August 10, 2002	Socorro	LINEAR	·	5.9 km	MPC · JPL
99880	2002 PT_{91}	—	August 14, 2002	Socorro	LINEAR	EOS	4.2 km	MPC · JPL
99881	2002 PX_{91}	—	August 14, 2002	Socorro	LINEAR	EOS	3.8 km	MPC · JPL
99882	2002 PD_{94}	—	August 11, 2002	Haleakala	NEAT	·	4.0 km	MPC · JPL
99883	2002 PP_{134}	—	August 14, 2002	Socorro	LINEAR	·	7.5 km	MPC · JPL
99884	2002 PF_{135}	—	August 14, 2002	Socorro	LINEAR	EOS	4.3 km	MPC · JPL
99885	2002 PR_{157}	—	August 8, 2002	Palomar	S. F. Hönig	·	6.4 km	MPC · JPL
99886	2002 PV_{158}	—	August 8, 2002	Palomar	S. F. Hönig	·	2.7 km	MPC · JPL
99887	2002 PC_{159}	—	August 8, 2002	Palomar	S. F. Hönig	·	3.2 km	MPC · JPL
99888	2002 PK_{164}	—	August 8, 2002	Palomar	S. F. Hönig	KOR	2.2 km	MPC · JPL
99889	2002 PS_{164}	—	August 8, 2002	Palomar	S. F. Hönig	HYG	8.3 km	MPC · JPL
99890	2002 PZ_{164}	—	August 8, 2002	Palomar	S. F. Hönig	·	3.1 km	MPC · JPL
99891 Donwells	2002 PG_{165}	Donwells	August 9, 2002	Haleakala	Lowe, A.	·	5.1 km	MPC · JPL
99892	2002 QL	—	August 16, 2002	Anderson Mesa	LONEOS	(6355)	9.3 km	MPC · JPL
99893	2002 QX	—	August 16, 2002	Haleakala	NEAT	·	5.6 km	MPC · JPL
99894	2002 QR_{1}	—	August 16, 2002	Haleakala	NEAT	·	5.4 km	MPC · JPL
99895	2002 QS_{5}	—	August 16, 2002	Anderson Mesa	LONEOS	·	13 km	MPC · JPL
99896	2002 QO_{7}	—	August 16, 2002	Palomar	NEAT	·	5.5 km	MPC · JPL
99897	2002 QO_{14}	—	August 26, 2002	Palomar	NEAT	·	8.1 km	MPC · JPL
99898	2002 QF_{32}	—	August 29, 2002	Palomar	NEAT	·	2.1 km	MPC · JPL
99899	2002 QJ_{32}	—	August 29, 2002	Palomar	NEAT	·	11 km	MPC · JPL
99900	2002 QL_{32}	—	August 29, 2002	Palomar	NEAT	JUN · slow	3.3 km	MPC · JPL

== 99901–100000 ==
back to top

Designation			Discovery			Properties		Ref
Permanent	Provisional	Named after	Date	Site	Discoverer(s)	Category	Diam.	Ref
99901	2002 QL_{44}	—	August 29, 2002	Palomar	NEAT	EOS	4.2 km	MPC · JPL
99902	2002 QZ_{47}	—	August 18, 2002	Palomar	S. F. Hönig	·	1.7 km	MPC · JPL
99903	2002 QG_{48}	—	August 17, 2002	Palomar	S. F. Hönig	AST	4.2 km	MPC · JPL
99904	2002 QH_{48}	—	August 27, 2002	Palomar	S. F. Hönig	·	3.4 km	MPC · JPL
99905 Jeffgrossman	2002 QX_{50}	Jeffgrossman	August 27, 2002	Palomar	R. Matson	CYB	6.6 km	MPC · JPL
99906 Uofalberta	2002 QV_{53}	Uofalberta	August 17, 2002	Palomar	Lowe, A.	·	6.8 km	MPC · JPL
99907	1989 VA	—	November 2, 1989	Palomar	C. S. Shoemaker	ATE +1km	1.4 km	MPC · JPL
99908	1990 OD_{6}	—	July 20, 1990	Palomar	Lowe, A.	·	2.9 km	MPC · JPL
99909	1994 PU_{2}	—	August 10, 1994	La Silla	E. W. Elst	·	1.9 km	MPC · JPL
99910	1994 TO_{4}	—	October 2, 1994	Kitt Peak	Spacewatch	·	2.0 km	MPC · JPL
99911	1995 SE_{53}	—	September 28, 1995	Xinglong	SCAP	NYS	3.1 km	MPC · JPL
99912	1995 UY_{44}	—	October 31, 1995	Modra	A. Galád, Pravda, A.	·	4.2 km	MPC · JPL
99913	1997 CZ_{5}	—	February 7, 1997	Haleakala	NEAT	moon	6.2 km	MPC · JPL
99914	1997 ST_{24}	—	September 30, 1997	Kitt Peak	Spacewatch	KOR	2.7 km	MPC · JPL
99915 Henarejos	1997 TR_{6}	Henarejos	October 2, 1997	Caussols	ODAS	·	4.5 km	MPC · JPL
99916	1998 AA_{5}	—	January 3, 1998	Woomera	F. B. Zoltowski	GEF	3.6 km	MPC · JPL
99917	1998 HH_{19}	—	April 18, 1998	Socorro	LINEAR	·	2.3 km	MPC · JPL
99918	1998 SQ_{2}	—	September 18, 1998	Catalina	CSS	·	3.8 km	MPC · JPL
99919	1999 RR_{31}	—	September 8, 1999	Ondřejov	L. Kotková	·	2.4 km	MPC · JPL
99920	1999 RJ_{90}	—	September 7, 1999	Socorro	LINEAR	·	3.1 km	MPC · JPL
99921	1999 RO_{190}	—	September 15, 1999	Ondřejov	P. Pravec, P. Kušnirák	V	1.7 km	MPC · JPL
99922	1999 RC_{193}	—	September 13, 1999	Socorro	LINEAR	·	2.1 km	MPC · JPL
99923	1999 XS_{108}	—	December 4, 1999	Catalina	CSS	·	2.7 km	MPC · JPL
99924	2000 AG_{62}	—	January 4, 2000	Socorro	LINEAR	MAR	2.9 km	MPC · JPL
99925	2000 CF_{88}	—	February 4, 2000	Socorro	LINEAR	EUN	3.6 km	MPC · JPL
99926	2000 CQ_{93}	—	February 8, 2000	Socorro	LINEAR	·	2.6 km	MPC · JPL
99927	2000 ED_{90}	—	March 9, 2000	Socorro	LINEAR	·	2.8 km	MPC · JPL
99928 Brainard	2000 EQ_{147}	Brainard	March 4, 2000	Catalina	CSS	·	8.2 km	MPC · JPL
99929	2000 FF_{55}	—	March 29, 2000	Socorro	LINEAR	·	3.0 km	MPC · JPL
99930	2000 GL_{87}	—	April 4, 2000	Socorro	LINEAR	EOS	5.4 km	MPC · JPL
99931	2000 SK_{115}	—	September 24, 2000	Socorro	LINEAR	·	1.8 km	MPC · JPL
99932	2000 VO_{34}	—	November 1, 2000	Socorro	LINEAR	·	2.4 km	MPC · JPL
99933	2000 YN_{76}	—	December 30, 2000	Socorro	LINEAR	·	1.8 km	MPC · JPL
99934	2001 DL_{5}	—	February 16, 2001	Socorro	LINEAR	·	2.1 km	MPC · JPL
99935	2002 AV_{4}	—	January 8, 2002	Socorro	LINEAR	APO +1km	2.1 km	MPC · JPL
99936	2002 RH_{183}	—	September 11, 2002	Palomar	NEAT	·	11 km	MPC · JPL
99937	2003 QT_{88}	—	August 25, 2003	Socorro	LINEAR	KOR	3.7 km	MPC · JPL
99938	2003 UC_{149}	—	October 19, 2003	Palomar	NEAT	·	4.0 km	MPC · JPL
99939	2003 US_{149}	—	October 20, 2003	Socorro	LINEAR	·	6.9 km	MPC · JPL
99940	2003 UM_{265}	—	October 27, 2003	Socorro	LINEAR	V	1.6 km	MPC · JPL
99941 Lonniewege	2003 WF_{107}	Lonniewege	November 23, 2003	Catalina	CSS	EUN	3.3 km	MPC · JPL
99942 Apophis	2004 MN_{4}	Apophis	June 19, 2004	Kitt Peak	R. A. Tucker, D. J. Tholen, F. Bernardi	ATE · PHA	340 m	MPC · JPL
99943	2005 AS_{2}	—	January 6, 2005	Catalina	CSS	L5	23 km	MPC · JPL
99944	2710 P-L	—	September 24, 1960	Palomar	C. J. van Houten, I. van Houten-Groeneveld, T. Gehrels	·	6.7 km	MPC · JPL
99945	4589 P-L	—	September 24, 1960	Palomar	C. J. van Houten, I. van Houten-Groeneveld, T. Gehrels	·	3.7 km	MPC · JPL
99946	4134 T-1	—	March 26, 1971	Palomar	C. J. van Houten, I. van Houten-Groeneveld, T. Gehrels	NYS	3.5 km	MPC · JPL
99947	4220 T-2	—	September 29, 1973	Palomar	C. J. van Houten, I. van Houten-Groeneveld, T. Gehrels	·	2.9 km	MPC · JPL
99948	1952 SU_{1}	—	September 23, 1952	Mount Wilson	L. E. Cunningham	·	2.5 km	MPC · JPL
99949 Miepgies	1972 FD	Miepgies	March 16, 1972	Palomar	T. Gehrels	·	9.3 km	MPC · JPL
99950 Euchenor	1973 SC_{1}	Euchenor	September 19, 1973	Palomar	C. J. van Houten, I. van Houten-Groeneveld, T. Gehrels	L4	20 km	MPC · JPL
99951	1975 SV_{1}	—	September 30, 1975	Palomar	S. J. Bus	HYG	5.1 km	MPC · JPL
99952	1975 SY_{1}	—	September 30, 1975	Palomar	S. J. Bus	·	3.0 km	MPC · JPL
99953	1978 ND	—	July 7, 1978	Palomar	C. T. Kowal	·	4.7 km	MPC · JPL
99954	1978 NH	—	July 10, 1978	Palomar	E. F. Helin, E. M. Shoemaker	·	5.3 km	MPC · JPL
99955	1978 UM_{5}	—	October 27, 1978	Palomar	C. M. Olmstead	GEF	2.1 km	MPC · JPL
99956	1978 VA	—	November 5, 1978	Palomar	E. F. Helin	·	4.2 km	MPC · JPL
99957	1978 VM_{4}	—	November 7, 1978	Palomar	E. F. Helin, S. J. Bus	·	2.5 km	MPC · JPL
99958	1978 VB_{9}	—	November 6, 1978	Palomar	E. F. Helin, S. J. Bus	NYS	1.7 km	MPC · JPL
99959	1978 VW_{9}	—	November 7, 1978	Palomar	E. F. Helin, S. J. Bus	·	3.5 km	MPC · JPL
99960	1978 VD_{10}	—	November 6, 1978	Palomar	E. F. Helin, S. J. Bus	·	1.9 km	MPC · JPL
99961	1979 MT_{2}	—	June 25, 1979	Siding Spring	E. F. Helin, S. J. Bus	·	6.1 km	MPC · JPL
99962	1979 MF_{3}	—	June 25, 1979	Siding Spring	E. F. Helin, S. J. Bus	·	3.0 km	MPC · JPL
99963	1979 MO_{5}	—	June 25, 1979	Siding Spring	E. F. Helin, S. J. Bus	·	2.5 km	MPC · JPL
99964	1979 MJ_{6}	—	June 25, 1979	Siding Spring	E. F. Helin, S. J. Bus	MAS	1.1 km	MPC · JPL
99965	1979 MC_{7}	—	June 25, 1979	Siding Spring	E. F. Helin, S. J. Bus	NYS	1.6 km	MPC · JPL
99966	1979 MC_{8}	—	June 25, 1979	Siding Spring	E. F. Helin, S. J. Bus	·	1.7 km	MPC · JPL
99967	1979 OG_{8}	—	July 24, 1979	Siding Spring	S. J. Bus	·	3.5 km	MPC · JPL
99968	1979 QQ_{2}	—	August 22, 1979	La Silla	C.-I. Lagerkvist	·	2.9 km	MPC · JPL
99969	1981 DY_{1}	—	February 28, 1981	Siding Spring	S. J. Bus	·	7.7 km	MPC · JPL
99970	1981 DB_{2}	—	February 28, 1981	Siding Spring	S. J. Bus	·	5.0 km	MPC · JPL
99971	1981 DF_{3}	—	February 28, 1981	Siding Spring	S. J. Bus	·	4.7 km	MPC · JPL
99972	1981 EV_{5}	—	March 7, 1981	Siding Spring	S. J. Bus	EOS	4.6 km	MPC · JPL
99973	1981 EB_{6}	—	March 7, 1981	Siding Spring	S. J. Bus	·	8.3 km	MPC · JPL
99974	1981 EJ_{6}	—	March 2, 1981	Siding Spring	S. J. Bus	AEG	6.2 km	MPC · JPL
99975	1981 EP_{6}	—	March 6, 1981	Siding Spring	S. J. Bus	·	10 km	MPC · JPL
99976	1981 EZ_{6}	—	March 6, 1981	Siding Spring	S. J. Bus	·	1.7 km	MPC · JPL
99977	1981 ET_{12}	—	March 1, 1981	Siding Spring	S. J. Bus	·	1.5 km	MPC · JPL
99978	1981 ER_{13}	—	March 1, 1981	Siding Spring	S. J. Bus	·	3.7 km	MPC · JPL
99979	1981 EE_{16}	—	March 1, 1981	Siding Spring	S. J. Bus	·	1.5 km	MPC · JPL
99980	1981 ER_{18}	—	March 2, 1981	Siding Spring	S. J. Bus	(5)	3.0 km	MPC · JPL
99981	1981 EF_{20}	—	March 2, 1981	Siding Spring	S. J. Bus	·	5.5 km	MPC · JPL
99982	1981 EJ_{21}	—	March 2, 1981	Siding Spring	S. J. Bus	HIL · 3:2	9.5 km	MPC · JPL
99983	1981 EF_{22}	—	March 2, 1981	Siding Spring	S. J. Bus	·	2.2 km	MPC · JPL
99984	1981 EL_{23}	—	March 3, 1981	Siding Spring	S. J. Bus	·	5.1 km	MPC · JPL
99985	1981 EJ_{25}	—	March 2, 1981	Siding Spring	S. J. Bus	NYS	2.4 km	MPC · JPL
99986	1981 ET_{28}	—	March 1, 1981	Siding Spring	S. J. Bus	·	4.4 km	MPC · JPL
99987	1981 EC_{31}	—	March 2, 1981	Siding Spring	S. J. Bus	EUN	2.2 km	MPC · JPL
99988	1981 ET_{33}	—	March 1, 1981	Siding Spring	S. J. Bus	·	6.3 km	MPC · JPL
99989	1981 EL_{35}	—	March 2, 1981	Siding Spring	S. J. Bus	·	6.2 km	MPC · JPL
99990	1981 EM_{35}	—	March 2, 1981	Siding Spring	S. J. Bus	·	1.8 km	MPC · JPL
99991	1981 EY_{37}	—	March 1, 1981	Siding Spring	S. J. Bus	·	1.3 km	MPC · JPL
99992	1981 ER_{41}	—	March 2, 1981	Siding Spring	S. J. Bus	·	9.6 km	MPC · JPL
99993	1981 ED_{42}	—	March 2, 1981	Siding Spring	S. J. Bus	·	4.7 km	MPC · JPL
99994	1981 EN_{44}	—	March 7, 1981	Siding Spring	S. J. Bus	·	4.0 km	MPC · JPL
99995	1981 ED_{45}	—	March 7, 1981	Siding Spring	S. J. Bus	V	1.0 km	MPC · JPL
99996	1981 EJ_{45}	—	March 1, 1981	Siding Spring	S. J. Bus	·	5.2 km	MPC · JPL
99997	1981 EN_{45}	—	March 1, 1981	Siding Spring	S. J. Bus	·	3.3 km	MPC · JPL
99998	1981 ED_{48}	—	March 6, 1981	Siding Spring	S. J. Bus	·	2.6 km	MPC · JPL
99999	1981 FP	—	March 28, 1981	Harvard Observatory	Harvard Observatory	NYS	2.2 km	MPC · JPL
100000 Astronautica	1982 SH_{1}	Astronautica	September 28, 1982	Palomar	Gibson, J.	H	940 m	MPC · JPL

back to top

== See also ==
- Meanings of minor-planet names: 99001–100000
