= 100000 Astronautica =

Sub-kilometer asteroid

Discovery
- Discovered by: J. B. Gibson
- Discovery site: Palomar Observatory
- Discovery date: 28 September 1982

Designations
- Pronunciation: /ˌæstrəˈnɔːtəkə/
- Named after: 50th anniv. Space Age (Latin: star sailor)
- Alternative designations: 1982 SH_{1} · 2002 CW_{115}
- Minor planet category: main-belt · (inner); Hungaria

Orbital characteristics
- Epoch 27 April 2019 (JD 2458600.5)
- Uncertainty parameter 0
- Observation arc: 35.59 yr (12,999 d)
- Aphelion: 2.0707 AU
- Perihelion: 1.7388 AU
- Semi-major axis: 1.9048 AU
- Eccentricity: 0.0871
- Orbital period (sidereal): 2.63 yr (960 d)
- Mean anomaly: 309.12°
- Mean motion: 0° 22^{m} 29.64^{s} / day
- Inclination: 21.185°
- Longitude of ascending node: 186.56°
- Argument of perihelion: 199.64°
- Earth MOID: 0.7440 AU (290 LD)

Physical characteristics
- Mean diameter: 0.94 km (est. at 0.35)
- Spectral type: E (family based)
- Absolute magnitude (H): 16.9

100000 Astronautica (provisional designation 1982 SH_{1}) is a sub-kilometer asteroid and member of the Hungaria family from the innermost region of the asteroid belt, approximately 940 meters (0.58 miles) in diameter. It was discovered on 28 September 1982, by American astronomer James Gibson at Palomar Observatory, California, United States. The likely bright E-type asteroid was named Astronautica, the Latin word for "star sailor", on the 50th anniversary of the Space Age.

== Orbit and classification ==
Astronautica is a core member of the Hungaria family (003), an asteroid family and dynamical group, which forms the innermost dense concentration of asteroids in the Solar System. It orbits the Sun in the inner asteroid belt at a distance of 1.7–2.1 AU once every 2 years and 8 months (960 days; semi-major axis of 1.9 AU). Its orbit has an eccentricity of 0.09 and an inclination of 21° with respect to the ecliptic. The body's observation arc begins with its discovery observation at Palomar Observatory in September 1982.

== Naming ==
This minor planet marked the milestone of the 100,000th numbered minor planet in October 2005. It was named by the International Astronomical Union's Committee on Small Body Nomenclature to recognize the 50th anniversary of the start of the Space Age, as marked by the launch of the Soviet Sputnik spacecraft into orbit on 4 October 1957. The official naming citation was published by the Minor Planet Center on 26 September 2007 (M.P.C. 60731). The number 100,000 is significant because it marks the altitude in meters where outer space begins, as delineated by the Kármán line established by the Fédération Aéronautique Internationale. The name "Astronautica" is Latin for "star sailor".

== Physical characteristics ==
Most members of the Hungaria family are E-type asteroids, which means they have extremely bright enstatite surfaces and albedos typically around 0.35. Based on the body's estimated albedo and its absolute magnitude of 16.9, Astronautica measures approximately 940 meters (0.58 miles) in diameter. As of 2018, no rotational lightcurve of Astronautica has been obtained from photometric observations. The body's rotation period, pole and shape remain unknown.

== See also ==
- 1000 Piazzia (the one thousandth numbered minor planet)
