= 99906 Uofalberta =

Main-belt asteroid

Discovery
- Discovered by: A. Lowe
- Discovery site: Palomar Obs.
- Discovery date: 17 August 2002

Designations
- Pronunciation: /ˈjuːəvælˈbɜːrtə/
- Named after: University of Alberta
- Alternative designations: 2002 QV_{53}
- Minor planet category: main-belt · (outer) background

Orbital characteristics
- Epoch 27 April 2019 (JD 2458600.5)
- Uncertainty parameter 0
- Observation arc: 20.63 yr (7,536 d)
- Aphelion: 3.4925 AU
- Perihelion: 2.9316 AU
- Semi-major axis: 3.2120 AU
- Eccentricity: 0.0873
- Orbital period (sidereal): 5.76 yr (2,103 d)
- Mean anomaly: 282.41°
- Mean motion: 0° 10^{m} 16.32^{s} / day
- Inclination: 11.665°
- Longitude of ascending node: 161.15°
- Argument of perihelion: 219.28°

Physical characteristics
- Mean diameter: 6.834±0.303 km
- Geometric albedo: 0.055±0.015
- Absolute magnitude (H): 14.8

99906 Uofalberta (provisional designation 2002 QV_{53}) is a dark background asteroid from the outermost region of the asteroid belt, approximately 6.8 kilometers (4.2 miles) in diameter. It was discovered by Canadian amateur astronomer Andrew Lowe on 17 August 2002, from digitized photographic plates taken at the Palomar Observatory. It was named for the University of Alberta.

== Orbit and classification ==
Uofalberta is a non-family asteroid from the main belt's background population, located just inside the region of the Cybele asteroids (3.3–3.7 AU). It orbits the Sun in the outer asteroid belt at a distance of 2.9–3.5 AU once every 5 years and 9 months (2,103 days; semi-major axis of 3.21 AU). Its orbit has an eccentricity of 0.09 and an inclination of 12° with respect to the ecliptic.

The body's first observation was found on images taken by the Siding Spring Observatory in November 1997, and were published by the Digitized Sky Survey (DSS) later on. The asteroid's observation arc begins with a precovery in February 1999, when it was observed at the Near-Earth Asteroid Tracking at Haleakala Observatory.

== Naming ==
This minor planet was named after the University of Alberta; the initials of its motto Quaecumque Vera ("Whatsoever things are true") appear in the provisional designation. The official naming citation was published by the Minor Planet Center on 18 September 2005 (M.P.C. 54830).

== Physical characteristics ==
According to the survey carried out by the NEOWISE mission of NASA's Wide-field Infrared Survey Explorer, Uofalberta measures 6.834 kilometers in diameter and its surface has an albedo of 0.055. Due to its low albedo and location far out the asteroid belt, Uofalberta is likely a carbonaceous C-type asteroid. As of 2018, no rotational lightcurve of Uofalberta has been obtained from photometric observations. The body's rotation period, pole and shape remain unknown.
