= List of minor planets: 94001–95000 =

The following is a partial list of minor planets, running from minor-planet number 94001 through 95000, inclusive. The primary data for this and other partial lists is based on JPL's "Small-Body Orbital Elements" and data available from the Minor Planet Center. Critical list information is also provided by the MPC, unless otherwise specified from Lowell Observatory. A detailed description of the table's columns and additional sources are given on the main page including a complete list of every page in this series, and a statistical break-up on the dynamical classification of minor planets.

Also see the summary list of all named bodies in numerical and alphabetical order, and the corresponding naming citations for the number range of this particular list. New namings may only be added to this list after official publication, as the preannouncement of names is condemned by the Working Group for Small Bodies Nomenclature of the International Astronomical Union.

Near-Earth obj.	MBA (inner)	MBA (outer)	Centaur
Mars-crosser	MBA (middle)	Jupiter trojan	Trans-Neptunian obj.
Unclassified

== 94001–94100 ==
Designation			Discovery			Properties		Ref
Permanent	Provisional	Named after	Date	Site	Discoverer(s)	Category	Diam.	Ref
94001	2000 XP_{21}	—	December 4, 2000	Socorro	LINEAR	ADE	4.8 km	MPC · JPL
94002	2000 XX_{22}	—	December 4, 2000	Socorro	LINEAR	·	9.2 km	MPC · JPL
94003	2000 XZ_{23}	—	December 4, 2000	Socorro	LINEAR	·	3.0 km	MPC · JPL
94004	2000 XL_{24}	—	December 4, 2000	Socorro	LINEAR	EOS	4.8 km	MPC · JPL
94005	2000 XO_{25}	—	December 4, 2000	Socorro	LINEAR	·	2.7 km	MPC · JPL
94006	2000 XQ_{25}	—	December 4, 2000	Socorro	LINEAR	EOS	4.1 km	MPC · JPL
94007	2000 XR_{25}	—	December 4, 2000	Socorro	LINEAR	·	6.9 km	MPC · JPL
94008	2000 XT_{25}	—	December 4, 2000	Socorro	LINEAR	EOS	3.9 km	MPC · JPL
94009	2000 XZ_{26}	—	December 4, 2000	Socorro	LINEAR	·	7.0 km	MPC · JPL
94010	2000 XJ_{27}	—	December 4, 2000	Socorro	LINEAR	EUN	3.2 km	MPC · JPL
94011	2000 XZ_{27}	—	December 4, 2000	Socorro	LINEAR	EUN	4.1 km	MPC · JPL
94012	2000 XM_{28}	—	December 4, 2000	Socorro	LINEAR	·	7.4 km	MPC · JPL
94013	2000 XP_{28}	—	December 4, 2000	Socorro	LINEAR	MAR	2.6 km	MPC · JPL
94014	2000 XJ_{29}	—	December 4, 2000	Socorro	LINEAR	·	2.1 km	MPC · JPL
94015	2000 XT_{29}	—	December 4, 2000	Socorro	LINEAR	EUN	3.4 km	MPC · JPL
94016	2000 XC_{30}	—	December 4, 2000	Socorro	LINEAR	·	3.4 km	MPC · JPL
94017	2000 XT_{30}	—	December 4, 2000	Socorro	LINEAR	·	5.4 km	MPC · JPL
94018	2000 XM_{31}	—	December 4, 2000	Socorro	LINEAR	ADE	5.8 km	MPC · JPL
94019	2000 XN_{32}	—	December 4, 2000	Socorro	LINEAR	EOS	3.6 km	MPC · JPL
94020	2000 XH_{33}	—	December 4, 2000	Socorro	LINEAR	·	2.3 km	MPC · JPL
94021	2000 XJ_{33}	—	December 4, 2000	Socorro	LINEAR	·	5.8 km	MPC · JPL
94022	2000 XH_{35}	—	December 4, 2000	Socorro	LINEAR	·	8.3 km	MPC · JPL
94023	2000 XL_{36}	—	December 5, 2000	Socorro	LINEAR	MAR	4.0 km	MPC · JPL
94024	2000 XS_{36}	—	December 5, 2000	Socorro	LINEAR	EUN	3.9 km	MPC · JPL
94025	2000 XC_{37}	—	December 5, 2000	Socorro	LINEAR	EUN	2.2 km	MPC · JPL
94026	2000 XF_{39}	—	December 4, 2000	Socorro	LINEAR	·	3.0 km	MPC · JPL
94027	2000 XL_{39}	—	December 4, 2000	Socorro	LINEAR	MAR	3.4 km	MPC · JPL
94028	2000 XM_{39}	—	December 4, 2000	Socorro	LINEAR	·	4.5 km	MPC · JPL
94029	2000 XN_{39}	—	December 4, 2000	Socorro	LINEAR	·	3.6 km	MPC · JPL
94030	2000 XC_{40}	—	December 5, 2000	Socorro	LINEAR	·	11 km	MPC · JPL
94031	2000 XF_{40}	—	December 5, 2000	Socorro	LINEAR	·	3.8 km	MPC · JPL
94032	2000 XC_{41}	—	December 5, 2000	Socorro	LINEAR	·	13 km	MPC · JPL
94033	2000 XS_{41}	—	December 5, 2000	Socorro	LINEAR	·	5.8 km	MPC · JPL
94034	2000 XB_{46}	—	December 15, 2000	Socorro	LINEAR	·	5.6 km	MPC · JPL
94035	2000 XX_{47}	—	December 4, 2000	Socorro	LINEAR	·	2.5 km	MPC · JPL
94036	2000 XG_{48}	—	December 4, 2000	Socorro	LINEAR	NAE	5.4 km	MPC · JPL
94037	2000 XK_{48}	—	December 4, 2000	Socorro	LINEAR	·	4.1 km	MPC · JPL
94038	2000 XX_{48}	—	December 4, 2000	Socorro	LINEAR	·	5.1 km	MPC · JPL
94039	2000 XW_{50}	—	December 6, 2000	Socorro	LINEAR	·	3.8 km	MPC · JPL
94040	2000 XE_{52}	—	December 6, 2000	Socorro	LINEAR	·	5.5 km	MPC · JPL
94041	2000 XK_{52}	—	December 6, 2000	Socorro	LINEAR	DOR	4.7 km	MPC · JPL
94042	2000 XU_{52}	—	December 6, 2000	Socorro	LINEAR	·	6.5 km	MPC · JPL
94043	2000 XB_{53}	—	December 6, 2000	Socorro	LINEAR	·	6.8 km	MPC · JPL
94044	2000 XW_{53}	—	December 15, 2000	Uccle	T. Pauwels	HOF	5.4 km	MPC · JPL
94045	2000 XO_{54}	—	December 11, 2000	Siding Spring	R. H. McNaught	·	2.9 km	MPC · JPL
94046	2000 YK	—	December 16, 2000	Socorro	LINEAR	HNS	2.8 km	MPC · JPL
94047	2000 YO_{1}	—	December 17, 2000	Socorro	LINEAR	MAR	3.0 km	MPC · JPL
94048	2000 YU_{2}	—	December 19, 2000	Socorro	LINEAR	·	4.1 km	MPC · JPL
94049	2000 YM_{4}	—	December 20, 2000	Kitt Peak	Spacewatch	KOR	2.6 km	MPC · JPL
94050	2000 YP_{4}	—	December 20, 2000	Kitt Peak	Spacewatch	·	5.5 km	MPC · JPL
94051	2000 YW_{4}	—	December 21, 2000	Kitt Peak	Spacewatch	·	4.0 km	MPC · JPL
94052	2000 YS_{5}	—	December 19, 2000	Socorro	LINEAR	·	4.9 km	MPC · JPL
94053	2000 YO_{6}	—	December 20, 2000	Socorro	LINEAR	·	4.0 km	MPC · JPL
94054	2000 YE_{9}	—	December 21, 2000	Kitt Peak	Spacewatch	EUN	2.8 km	MPC · JPL
94055	2000 YP_{11}	—	December 20, 2000	Kitt Peak	Spacewatch	KOR	2.6 km	MPC · JPL
94056	2000 YX_{12}	—	December 19, 2000	Haleakala	NEAT	·	2.1 km	MPC · JPL
94057	2000 YG_{14}	—	December 25, 2000	Kitt Peak	Spacewatch	·	5.7 km	MPC · JPL
94058	2000 YM_{17}	—	December 28, 2000	Fountain Hills	C. W. Juels	HNS	3.9 km	MPC · JPL
94059	2000 YA_{18}	—	December 20, 2000	Socorro	LINEAR	·	6.3 km	MPC · JPL
94060	2000 YE_{18}	—	December 20, 2000	Socorro	LINEAR	·	3.6 km	MPC · JPL
94061	2000 YF_{18}	—	December 20, 2000	Socorro	LINEAR	·	3.0 km	MPC · JPL
94062	2000 YF_{21}	—	December 29, 2000	Desert Beaver	W. K. Y. Yeung	·	3.1 km	MPC · JPL
94063	2000 YA_{22}	—	December 29, 2000	Desert Beaver	W. K. Y. Yeung	·	6.3 km	MPC · JPL
94064	2000 YQ_{25}	—	December 22, 2000	Socorro	LINEAR	KOR	3.0 km	MPC · JPL
94065	2000 YJ_{26}	—	December 28, 2000	Socorro	LINEAR	(5)	2.5 km	MPC · JPL
94066	2000 YT_{29}	—	December 29, 2000	Desert Beaver	W. K. Y. Yeung	·	5.7 km	MPC · JPL
94067	2000 YS_{31}	—	December 28, 2000	Haleakala	NEAT	ADE	5.2 km	MPC · JPL
94068	2000 YE_{34}	—	December 28, 2000	Socorro	LINEAR	EOS	4.2 km	MPC · JPL
94069	2000 YL_{34}	—	December 28, 2000	Socorro	LINEAR	·	6.7 km	MPC · JPL
94070	2000 YG_{36}	—	December 30, 2000	Socorro	LINEAR	·	2.6 km	MPC · JPL
94071	2000 YM_{37}	—	December 30, 2000	Socorro	LINEAR	·	7.6 km	MPC · JPL
94072	2000 YJ_{38}	—	December 30, 2000	Socorro	LINEAR	(5)	3.9 km	MPC · JPL
94073	2000 YA_{39}	—	December 30, 2000	Socorro	LINEAR	·	8.6 km	MPC · JPL
94074	2000 YB_{40}	—	December 30, 2000	Socorro	LINEAR	EOS	4.7 km	MPC · JPL
94075	2000 YZ_{40}	—	December 30, 2000	Socorro	LINEAR	·	3.7 km	MPC · JPL
94076	2000 YU_{41}	—	December 30, 2000	Socorro	LINEAR	·	3.9 km	MPC · JPL
94077	2000 YJ_{43}	—	December 30, 2000	Socorro	LINEAR	·	3.9 km	MPC · JPL
94078	2000 YC_{45}	—	December 30, 2000	Socorro	LINEAR	EOS	4.6 km	MPC · JPL
94079	2000 YN_{46}	—	December 30, 2000	Socorro	LINEAR	·	6.8 km	MPC · JPL
94080	2000 YC_{47}	—	December 30, 2000	Socorro	LINEAR	·	2.8 km	MPC · JPL
94081	2000 YE_{47}	—	December 30, 2000	Socorro	LINEAR	·	6.9 km	MPC · JPL
94082	2000 YD_{49}	—	December 30, 2000	Socorro	LINEAR	·	2.3 km	MPC · JPL
94083	2000 YZ_{51}	—	December 30, 2000	Socorro	LINEAR	THM	6.7 km	MPC · JPL
94084	2000 YL_{52}	—	December 30, 2000	Socorro	LINEAR	·	3.2 km	MPC · JPL
94085	2000 YV_{52}	—	December 30, 2000	Socorro	LINEAR	·	4.3 km	MPC · JPL
94086	2000 YG_{55}	—	December 30, 2000	Socorro	LINEAR	THM	4.4 km	MPC · JPL
94087	2000 YC_{58}	—	December 30, 2000	Socorro	LINEAR	EOS	4.1 km	MPC · JPL
94088	2000 YV_{58}	—	December 30, 2000	Socorro	LINEAR	VER	7.2 km	MPC · JPL
94089	2000 YQ_{59}	—	December 30, 2000	Socorro	LINEAR	KOR	3.8 km	MPC · JPL
94090	2000 YH_{60}	—	December 30, 2000	Socorro	LINEAR	·	2.7 km	MPC · JPL
94091	2000 YK_{61}	—	December 30, 2000	Socorro	LINEAR	·	3.2 km	MPC · JPL
94092	2000 YD_{62}	—	December 30, 2000	Socorro	LINEAR	EOS	3.9 km	MPC · JPL
94093	2000 YO_{63}	—	December 30, 2000	Socorro	LINEAR	·	6.8 km	MPC · JPL
94094	2000 YQ_{65}	—	December 16, 2000	Kitt Peak	Spacewatch	EOS	5.7 km	MPC · JPL
94095	2000 YG_{67}	—	December 28, 2000	Socorro	LINEAR	·	4.0 km	MPC · JPL
94096	2000 YS_{69}	—	December 30, 2000	Socorro	LINEAR	·	2.7 km	MPC · JPL
94097	2000 YT_{71}	—	December 30, 2000	Socorro	LINEAR	KOR	4.1 km	MPC · JPL
94098	2000 YV_{71}	—	December 30, 2000	Socorro	LINEAR	KOR	3.8 km	MPC · JPL
94099	2000 YS_{72}	—	December 30, 2000	Socorro	LINEAR	·	4.2 km	MPC · JPL
94100	2000 YH_{73}	—	December 30, 2000	Socorro	LINEAR	·	9.1 km	MPC · JPL

== 94101–94200 ==
back to top

Designation			Discovery			Properties		Ref
Permanent	Provisional	Named after	Date	Site	Discoverer(s)	Category	Diam.	Ref
94101	2000 YQ_{74}	—	December 30, 2000	Socorro	LINEAR	·	7.7 km	MPC · JPL
94102	2000 YA_{77}	—	December 30, 2000	Socorro	LINEAR	·	3.9 km	MPC · JPL
94103	2000 YU_{77}	—	December 30, 2000	Socorro	LINEAR	PAD	3.4 km	MPC · JPL
94104	2000 YG_{78}	—	December 30, 2000	Socorro	LINEAR	EOS	4.3 km	MPC · JPL
94105	2000 YX_{78}	—	December 30, 2000	Socorro	LINEAR	·	2.7 km	MPC · JPL
94106	2000 YB_{79}	—	December 30, 2000	Socorro	LINEAR	·	7.5 km	MPC · JPL
94107	2000 YW_{82}	—	December 30, 2000	Socorro	LINEAR	TIR ·	11 km	MPC · JPL
94108	2000 YY_{86}	—	December 30, 2000	Socorro	LINEAR	·	6.0 km	MPC · JPL
94109	2000 YP_{87}	—	December 30, 2000	Socorro	LINEAR	·	7.2 km	MPC · JPL
94110	2000 YZ_{87}	—	December 30, 2000	Socorro	LINEAR	·	2.7 km	MPC · JPL
94111	2000 YY_{88}	—	December 30, 2000	Socorro	LINEAR	(5)	3.3 km	MPC · JPL
94112	2000 YH_{90}	—	December 30, 2000	Socorro	LINEAR	·	4.5 km	MPC · JPL
94113	2000 YC_{91}	—	December 30, 2000	Socorro	LINEAR	·	4.8 km	MPC · JPL
94114	2000 YS_{96}	—	December 30, 2000	Socorro	LINEAR	·	5.9 km	MPC · JPL
94115	2000 YK_{98}	—	December 30, 2000	Socorro	LINEAR	·	8.0 km	MPC · JPL
94116	2000 YS_{101}	—	December 28, 2000	Socorro	LINEAR	·	5.6 km	MPC · JPL
94117	2000 YE_{102}	—	December 28, 2000	Socorro	LINEAR	·	2.7 km	MPC · JPL
94118	2000 YV_{102}	—	December 28, 2000	Socorro	LINEAR	·	3.9 km	MPC · JPL
94119	2000 YN_{103}	—	December 28, 2000	Socorro	LINEAR	·	2.7 km	MPC · JPL
94120	2000 YF_{106}	—	December 30, 2000	Socorro	LINEAR	·	6.6 km	MPC · JPL
94121	2000 YR_{107}	—	December 30, 2000	Socorro	LINEAR	·	6.5 km	MPC · JPL
94122	2000 YJ_{108}	—	December 30, 2000	Socorro	LINEAR	·	4.1 km	MPC · JPL
94123	2000 YN_{108}	—	December 30, 2000	Socorro	LINEAR	·	4.2 km	MPC · JPL
94124	2000 YJ_{109}	—	December 30, 2000	Socorro	LINEAR	·	3.7 km	MPC · JPL
94125	2000 YU_{111}	—	December 30, 2000	Socorro	LINEAR	·	3.3 km	MPC · JPL
94126	2000 YN_{112}	—	December 30, 2000	Socorro	LINEAR	EOS	4.3 km	MPC · JPL
94127	2000 YQ_{112}	—	December 30, 2000	Socorro	LINEAR	·	8.5 km	MPC · JPL
94128	2000 YC_{113}	—	December 30, 2000	Socorro	LINEAR	·	5.7 km	MPC · JPL
94129	2000 YU_{113}	—	December 30, 2000	Socorro	LINEAR	·	6.0 km	MPC · JPL
94130	2000 YA_{114}	—	December 30, 2000	Socorro	LINEAR	·	4.2 km	MPC · JPL
94131	2000 YH_{115}	—	December 30, 2000	Socorro	LINEAR	·	6.3 km	MPC · JPL
94132	2000 YO_{115}	—	December 30, 2000	Socorro	LINEAR	·	7.2 km	MPC · JPL
94133	2000 YH_{116}	—	December 30, 2000	Socorro	LINEAR	·	8.0 km	MPC · JPL
94134	2000 YT_{117}	—	December 30, 2000	Socorro	LINEAR	EOS · fast	3.1 km	MPC · JPL
94135	2000 YB_{119}	—	December 30, 2000	Anderson Mesa	LONEOS	EUN	2.6 km	MPC · JPL
94136	2000 YL_{122}	—	December 28, 2000	Socorro	LINEAR	(23255)	8.8 km	MPC · JPL
94137	2000 YN_{125}	—	December 29, 2000	Anderson Mesa	LONEOS	·	2.9 km	MPC · JPL
94138	2000 YZ_{129}	—	December 30, 2000	Socorro	LINEAR	NEM	5.1 km	MPC · JPL
94139	2000 YC_{130}	—	December 30, 2000	Socorro	LINEAR	·	4.2 km	MPC · JPL
94140	2000 YC_{134}	—	December 31, 2000	Haleakala	NEAT	·	3.6 km	MPC · JPL
94141	2000 YJ_{135}	—	December 17, 2000	Anderson Mesa	LONEOS	fast	5.8 km	MPC · JPL
94142	2000 YO_{136}	—	December 23, 2000	Kitt Peak	Spacewatch	·	3.4 km	MPC · JPL
94143	2000 YO_{139}	—	December 27, 2000	Anderson Mesa	LONEOS	·	7.3 km	MPC · JPL
94144	2000 YR_{139}	—	December 27, 2000	Anderson Mesa	LONEOS	TIR	5.2 km	MPC · JPL
94145	2000 YH_{140}	—	December 20, 2000	Socorro	LINEAR	·	4.4 km	MPC · JPL
94146	2001 AK_{1}	—	January 2, 2001	Kitt Peak	Spacewatch	·	5.0 km	MPC · JPL
94147	2001 AT_{3}	—	January 2, 2001	Socorro	LINEAR	·	4.7 km	MPC · JPL
94148	2001 AH_{4}	—	January 2, 2001	Socorro	LINEAR	·	7.2 km	MPC · JPL
94149	2001 AX_{4}	—	January 2, 2001	Socorro	LINEAR	·	2.9 km	MPC · JPL
94150	2001 AY_{4}	—	January 2, 2001	Socorro	LINEAR	DOR	6.1 km	MPC · JPL
94151	2001 AK_{5}	—	January 2, 2001	Socorro	LINEAR	·	4.0 km	MPC · JPL
94152	2001 AF_{7}	—	January 2, 2001	Socorro	LINEAR	(5)	3.5 km	MPC · JPL
94153	2001 AL_{8}	—	January 2, 2001	Socorro	LINEAR	KOR	2.8 km	MPC · JPL
94154	2001 AM_{8}	—	January 2, 2001	Socorro	LINEAR	EOS	4.6 km	MPC · JPL
94155	2001 AO_{8}	—	January 2, 2001	Socorro	LINEAR	EMA	7.2 km	MPC · JPL
94156	2001 AP_{8}	—	January 2, 2001	Socorro	LINEAR	·	4.2 km	MPC · JPL
94157	2001 AG_{10}	—	January 2, 2001	Socorro	LINEAR	EOS	5.6 km	MPC · JPL
94158	2001 AR_{13}	—	January 2, 2001	Socorro	LINEAR	·	6.3 km	MPC · JPL
94159	2001 AG_{14}	—	January 2, 2001	Socorro	LINEAR	·	3.8 km	MPC · JPL
94160	2001 AX_{14}	—	January 2, 2001	Socorro	LINEAR	EOS	4.5 km	MPC · JPL
94161	2001 AM_{15}	—	January 2, 2001	Socorro	LINEAR	·	4.3 km	MPC · JPL
94162	2001 AE_{17}	—	January 2, 2001	Socorro	LINEAR	(5)	3.4 km	MPC · JPL
94163	2001 AV_{20}	—	January 3, 2001	Socorro	LINEAR	EUN	2.9 km	MPC · JPL
94164	2001 AC_{21}	—	January 3, 2001	Socorro	LINEAR	·	6.8 km	MPC · JPL
94165	2001 AP_{21}	—	January 3, 2001	Socorro	LINEAR	·	4.7 km	MPC · JPL
94166	2001 AC_{22}	—	January 3, 2001	Socorro	LINEAR	EOS	4.5 km	MPC · JPL
94167	2001 AU_{22}	—	January 3, 2001	Socorro	LINEAR	VER	7.3 km	MPC · JPL
94168	2001 AZ_{22}	—	January 3, 2001	Socorro	LINEAR	EOS	3.4 km	MPC · JPL
94169	2001 AB_{26}	—	January 5, 2001	Socorro	LINEAR	·	3.6 km	MPC · JPL
94170	2001 AK_{27}	—	January 5, 2001	Socorro	LINEAR	·	3.9 km	MPC · JPL
94171	2001 AE_{28}	—	January 5, 2001	Socorro	LINEAR	·	10 km	MPC · JPL
94172	2001 AH_{30}	—	January 4, 2001	Socorro	LINEAR	·	4.3 km	MPC · JPL
94173	2001 AP_{30}	—	January 4, 2001	Socorro	LINEAR	HNS	4.2 km	MPC · JPL
94174	2001 AP_{31}	—	January 4, 2001	Socorro	LINEAR	·	5.9 km	MPC · JPL
94175	2001 AB_{32}	—	January 4, 2001	Socorro	LINEAR	EOS	3.5 km	MPC · JPL
94176	2001 AN_{32}	—	January 4, 2001	Socorro	LINEAR	EOS	4.8 km	MPC · JPL
94177	2001 AF_{33}	—	January 4, 2001	Socorro	LINEAR	·	7.1 km	MPC · JPL
94178	2001 AS_{33}	—	January 4, 2001	Socorro	LINEAR	·	5.4 km	MPC · JPL
94179	2001 AZ_{34}	—	January 4, 2001	Socorro	LINEAR	·	8.2 km	MPC · JPL
94180	2001 AY_{35}	—	January 5, 2001	Socorro	LINEAR	·	3.2 km	MPC · JPL
94181	2001 AS_{36}	—	January 5, 2001	Socorro	LINEAR	·	7.6 km	MPC · JPL
94182	2001 AJ_{38}	—	January 5, 2001	Socorro	LINEAR	EUN	3.7 km	MPC · JPL
94183	2001 AY_{38}	—	January 2, 2001	Socorro	LINEAR	KOR	2.5 km	MPC · JPL
94184	2001 AU_{42}	—	January 4, 2001	Anderson Mesa	LONEOS	·	8.3 km	MPC · JPL
94185	2001 AE_{43}	—	January 4, 2001	Anderson Mesa	LONEOS	URS	7.5 km	MPC · JPL
94186	2001 AH_{45}	—	January 15, 2001	Kleť	Kleť	·	7.9 km	MPC · JPL
94187	2001 AF_{52}	—	January 2, 2001	Anderson Mesa	LONEOS	EUP	11 km	MPC · JPL
94188	2001 AD_{53}	—	January 3, 2001	Anderson Mesa	LONEOS	·	5.0 km	MPC · JPL
94189	2001 BU	—	January 17, 2001	Oizumi	T. Kobayashi	·	6.7 km	MPC · JPL
94190	2001 BY	—	January 17, 2001	Oizumi	T. Kobayashi	EOS	3.7 km	MPC · JPL
94191	2001 BH_{1}	—	January 17, 2001	Socorro	LINEAR	·	3.5 km	MPC · JPL
94192	2001 BC_{7}	—	January 19, 2001	Socorro	LINEAR	·	4.5 km	MPC · JPL
94193	2001 BN_{7}	—	January 19, 2001	Socorro	LINEAR	·	7.0 km	MPC · JPL
94194	2001 BQ_{8}	—	January 19, 2001	Socorro	LINEAR	KOR	3.1 km	MPC · JPL
94195	2001 BU_{13}	—	January 22, 2001	Oaxaca	Roe, J. M.	·	6.4 km	MPC · JPL
94196	2001 BQ_{14}	—	January 21, 2001	Oizumi	T. Kobayashi	·	5.8 km	MPC · JPL
94197	2001 BB_{15}	—	January 21, 2001	Oizumi	T. Kobayashi	·	6.5 km	MPC · JPL
94198	2001 BL_{15}	—	January 21, 2001	Oizumi	T. Kobayashi	·	8.9 km	MPC · JPL
94199	2001 BM_{16}	—	January 18, 2001	Socorro	LINEAR	slow	4.8 km	MPC · JPL
94200	2001 BF_{17}	—	January 19, 2001	Socorro	LINEAR	·	3.2 km	MPC · JPL

== 94201–94300 ==
back to top

Designation			Discovery			Properties		Ref
Permanent	Provisional	Named after	Date	Site	Discoverer(s)	Category	Diam.	Ref
94201	2001 BE_{18}	—	January 19, 2001	Socorro	LINEAR	·	4.8 km	MPC · JPL
94202	2001 BF_{20}	—	January 19, 2001	Socorro	LINEAR	·	5.9 km	MPC · JPL
94203	2001 BF_{22}	—	January 20, 2001	Socorro	LINEAR	·	3.5 km	MPC · JPL
94204	2001 BR_{24}	—	January 20, 2001	Socorro	LINEAR	EOS	4.8 km	MPC · JPL
94205	2001 BM_{25}	—	January 20, 2001	Socorro	LINEAR	·	3.3 km	MPC · JPL
94206	2001 BS_{26}	—	January 20, 2001	Socorro	LINEAR	·	5.7 km	MPC · JPL
94207	2001 BH_{27}	—	January 20, 2001	Socorro	LINEAR	EOS · fast	4.0 km	MPC · JPL
94208	2001 BA_{29}	—	January 20, 2001	Socorro	LINEAR	·	4.5 km	MPC · JPL
94209	2001 BB_{33}	—	January 20, 2001	Socorro	LINEAR	·	14 km	MPC · JPL
94210	2001 BK_{33}	—	January 20, 2001	Socorro	LINEAR	·	2.3 km	MPC · JPL
94211	2001 BG_{34}	—	January 20, 2001	Socorro	LINEAR	EOS	5.4 km	MPC · JPL
94212	2001 BV_{34}	—	January 20, 2001	Socorro	LINEAR	EOS	4.3 km	MPC · JPL
94213	2001 BM_{35}	—	January 23, 2001	Oaxaca	Roe, J. M.	·	5.7 km	MPC · JPL
94214	2001 BV_{35}	—	January 18, 2001	Socorro	LINEAR	·	4.8 km	MPC · JPL
94215	2001 BO_{42}	—	January 19, 2001	Socorro	LINEAR	·	3.4 km	MPC · JPL
94216	2001 BT_{42}	—	January 19, 2001	Socorro	LINEAR	·	2.8 km	MPC · JPL
94217	2001 BH_{44}	—	January 19, 2001	Socorro	LINEAR	·	5.5 km	MPC · JPL
94218	2001 BK_{45}	—	January 20, 2001	Socorro	LINEAR	EUP	10 km	MPC · JPL
94219	2001 BP_{45}	—	January 21, 2001	Socorro	LINEAR	EUP	9.1 km	MPC · JPL
94220	2001 BF_{46}	—	January 21, 2001	Socorro	LINEAR	·	6.8 km	MPC · JPL
94221	2001 BD_{47}	—	January 21, 2001	Socorro	LINEAR	EOS	3.1 km	MPC · JPL
94222	2001 BE_{48}	—	January 21, 2001	Socorro	LINEAR	·	3.2 km	MPC · JPL
94223	2001 BU_{53}	—	January 17, 2001	Calar Alto	Calar Alto	·	4.3 km	MPC · JPL
94224	2001 BA_{57}	—	January 19, 2001	Haleakala	NEAT	·	4.0 km	MPC · JPL
94225	2001 BO_{59}	—	January 26, 2001	Socorro	LINEAR	EUP	8.4 km	MPC · JPL
94226	2001 BA_{61}	—	January 26, 2001	Socorro	LINEAR	·	7.9 km	MPC · JPL
94227	2001 BK_{61}	—	January 26, 2001	Haleakala	NEAT	·	8.4 km	MPC · JPL
94228 Leesuikwan	2001 BU_{61}	Leesuikwan	January 31, 2001	Desert Beaver	W. K. Y. Yeung	slow	4.8 km	MPC · JPL
94229	2001 BR_{62}	—	January 29, 2001	Socorro	LINEAR	GEF	3.1 km	MPC · JPL
94230	2001 BU_{63}	—	January 29, 2001	Socorro	LINEAR	CYB	12 km	MPC · JPL
94231	2001 BQ_{65}	—	January 26, 2001	Socorro	LINEAR	slow	8.8 km	MPC · JPL
94232	2001 BG_{67}	—	January 30, 2001	Socorro	LINEAR	·	7.2 km	MPC · JPL
94233	2001 BG_{68}	—	January 31, 2001	Socorro	LINEAR	·	4.4 km	MPC · JPL
94234	2001 BE_{74}	—	January 31, 2001	Kitt Peak	Spacewatch	ADE	5.9 km	MPC · JPL
94235	2001 BO_{74}	—	January 31, 2001	Socorro	LINEAR	·	5.8 km	MPC · JPL
94236	2001 BU_{75}	—	January 26, 2001	Socorro	LINEAR	·	4.2 km	MPC · JPL
94237	2001 BJ_{78}	—	January 24, 2001	Socorro	LINEAR	·	3.5 km	MPC · JPL
94238	2001 CM_{6}	—	February 1, 2001	Socorro	LINEAR	·	5.4 km	MPC · JPL
94239	2001 CT_{6}	—	February 1, 2001	Socorro	LINEAR	·	8.2 km	MPC · JPL
94240	2001 CO_{7}	—	February 1, 2001	Socorro	LINEAR	·	5.4 km	MPC · JPL
94241	2001 CC_{8}	—	February 1, 2001	Socorro	LINEAR	·	6.6 km	MPC · JPL
94242	2001 CE_{9}	—	February 1, 2001	Socorro	LINEAR	·	8.2 km	MPC · JPL
94243 Miquelroser	2001 CB_{10}	Miquelroser	February 3, 2001	Piera	Guarro, J.	·	9.9 km	MPC · JPL
94244	2001 CP_{10}	—	February 1, 2001	Socorro	LINEAR	EOS	4.3 km	MPC · JPL
94245	2001 CW_{11}	—	February 1, 2001	Socorro	LINEAR	·	5.8 km	MPC · JPL
94246	2001 CP_{15}	—	February 1, 2001	Socorro	LINEAR	SYL · CYB	9.6 km	MPC · JPL
94247	2001 CA_{18}	—	February 2, 2001	Socorro	LINEAR	THM	4.1 km	MPC · JPL
94248	2001 CX_{21}	—	February 1, 2001	Anderson Mesa	LONEOS	·	6.8 km	MPC · JPL
94249	2001 CN_{24}	—	February 1, 2001	Anderson Mesa	LONEOS	·	5.3 km	MPC · JPL
94250	2001 CZ_{26}	—	February 1, 2001	Haleakala	NEAT	·	7.9 km	MPC · JPL
94251	2001 CS_{27}	—	February 2, 2001	Anderson Mesa	LONEOS	·	10 km	MPC · JPL
94252	2001 CF_{28}	—	February 2, 2001	Anderson Mesa	LONEOS	·	8.5 km	MPC · JPL
94253	2001 CN_{28}	—	February 2, 2001	Anderson Mesa	LONEOS	·	8.6 km	MPC · JPL
94254	2001 CS_{29}	—	February 2, 2001	Anderson Mesa	LONEOS	·	3.7 km	MPC · JPL
94255	2001 CX_{30}	—	February 2, 2001	Haleakala	NEAT	·	3.6 km	MPC · JPL
94256	2001 CS_{33}	—	February 13, 2001	Socorro	LINEAR	·	5.3 km	MPC · JPL
94257	2001 CJ_{35}	—	February 13, 2001	Socorro	LINEAR	·	8.0 km	MPC · JPL
94258	2001 CZ_{36}	—	February 14, 2001	Ondřejov	L. Kotková	·	5.2 km	MPC · JPL
94259	2001 CQ_{38}	—	February 13, 2001	Socorro	LINEAR	EUN	3.0 km	MPC · JPL
94260	2001 CJ_{40}	—	February 13, 2001	Socorro	LINEAR	·	8.7 km	MPC · JPL
94261	2001 CL_{40}	—	February 13, 2001	Socorro	LINEAR	·	10 km	MPC · JPL
94262	2001 CK_{43}	—	February 15, 2001	Socorro	LINEAR	·	3.6 km	MPC · JPL
94263	2001 CC_{44}	—	February 15, 2001	Socorro	LINEAR	EUP	8.7 km	MPC · JPL
94264	2001 CG_{44}	—	February 15, 2001	Socorro	LINEAR	URS	7.5 km	MPC · JPL
94265	2001 CU_{45}	—	February 15, 2001	Socorro	LINEAR	·	9.6 km	MPC · JPL
94266	2001 DO	—	February 16, 2001	Ondřejov	P. Pravec, L. Kotková	HIL · 3:2	11 km	MPC · JPL
94267	2001 DR_{3}	—	February 16, 2001	Socorro	LINEAR	·	5.4 km	MPC · JPL
94268	2001 DR_{10}	—	February 17, 2001	Socorro	LINEAR	VER	5.0 km	MPC · JPL
94269	2001 DS_{18}	—	February 16, 2001	Socorro	LINEAR	slow	10 km	MPC · JPL
94270	2001 DZ_{19}	—	February 16, 2001	Socorro	LINEAR	·	8.0 km	MPC · JPL
94271	2001 DO_{21}	—	February 16, 2001	Socorro	LINEAR	·	8.4 km	MPC · JPL
94272	2001 DB_{24}	—	February 17, 2001	Socorro	LINEAR	THM	4.6 km	MPC · JPL
94273	2001 DR_{29}	—	February 17, 2001	Socorro	LINEAR	·	6.3 km	MPC · JPL
94274	2001 DC_{30}	—	February 17, 2001	Socorro	LINEAR	·	6.5 km	MPC · JPL
94275	2001 DN_{34}	—	February 19, 2001	Socorro	LINEAR	HIL · 3:2 · (6124)	13 km	MPC · JPL
94276	2001 DQ_{34}	—	February 19, 2001	Socorro	LINEAR	VER	8.5 km	MPC · JPL
94277	2001 DR_{35}	—	February 19, 2001	Socorro	LINEAR	THM	4.4 km	MPC · JPL
94278	2001 DT_{36}	—	February 19, 2001	Socorro	LINEAR	CYB	7.6 km	MPC · JPL
94279	2001 DD_{40}	—	February 19, 2001	Socorro	LINEAR	EOS	4.0 km	MPC · JPL
94280	2001 DG_{42}	—	February 19, 2001	Socorro	LINEAR	·	5.4 km	MPC · JPL
94281	2001 DN_{44}	—	February 19, 2001	Socorro	LINEAR	VER	6.6 km	MPC · JPL
94282	2001 DO_{46}	—	February 19, 2001	Socorro	LINEAR	·	8.8 km	MPC · JPL
94283	2001 DJ_{48}	—	February 16, 2001	Socorro	LINEAR	EOS	4.5 km	MPC · JPL
94284	2001 DW_{51}	—	February 16, 2001	Socorro	LINEAR	EOS	5.8 km	MPC · JPL
94285	2001 DY_{51}	—	February 16, 2001	Socorro	LINEAR	VER	5.5 km	MPC · JPL
94286	2001 DK_{58}	—	February 17, 2001	Haleakala	NEAT	·	7.5 km	MPC · JPL
94287	2001 DU_{60}	—	February 19, 2001	Socorro	LINEAR	·	6.9 km	MPC · JPL
94288	2001 DY_{62}	—	February 19, 2001	Socorro	LINEAR	·	4.0 km	MPC · JPL
94289	2001 DD_{68}	—	February 19, 2001	Socorro	LINEAR	·	6.0 km	MPC · JPL
94290	2001 DQ_{79}	—	February 20, 2001	Haleakala	NEAT	(1547)	4.1 km	MPC · JPL
94291 Django	2001 DX_{86}	Django	February 28, 2001	Badlands	Dyvig, R.	·	4.8 km	MPC · JPL
94292	2001 DN_{95}	—	February 18, 2001	Haleakala	NEAT	·	6.1 km	MPC · JPL
94293	2001 DT_{95}	—	February 17, 2001	Socorro	LINEAR	·	6.4 km	MPC · JPL
94294	2001 DY_{96}	—	February 17, 2001	Socorro	LINEAR	EOS	3.4 km	MPC · JPL
94295	2001 DD_{97}	—	February 17, 2001	Socorro	LINEAR	EOS	3.7 km	MPC · JPL
94296	2001 DK_{101}	—	February 16, 2001	Socorro	LINEAR	VER	4.4 km	MPC · JPL
94297	2001 DZ_{102}	—	February 16, 2001	Kitt Peak	Spacewatch	THM	5.1 km	MPC · JPL
94298	2001 DW_{105}	—	February 16, 2001	Anderson Mesa	LONEOS	EMA	6.8 km	MPC · JPL
94299	2001 DB_{108}	—	February 16, 2001	Anderson Mesa	LONEOS	T_{j} (2.99) · 3:2	11 km	MPC · JPL
94300	2001 ED_{1}	—	March 1, 2001	Socorro	LINEAR	·	6.6 km	MPC · JPL

== 94301–94400 ==
back to top

Designation			Discovery			Properties		Ref
Permanent	Provisional	Named after	Date	Site	Discoverer(s)	Category	Diam.	Ref
94301	2001 EF_{8}	—	March 2, 2001	Anderson Mesa	LONEOS	CYB	7.5 km	MPC · JPL
94302	2001 EY_{15}	—	March 15, 2001	Oizumi	T. Kobayashi	·	10 km	MPC · JPL
94303	2001 EH_{17}	—	March 15, 2001	Socorro	LINEAR	·	12 km	MPC · JPL
94304	2001 ER_{24}	—	March 13, 2001	Anderson Mesa	LONEOS	·	6.6 km	MPC · JPL
94305	2001 FX_{2}	—	March 18, 2001	Socorro	LINEAR	·	6.9 km	MPC · JPL
94306	2001 FS_{11}	—	March 19, 2001	Anderson Mesa	LONEOS	·	9.1 km	MPC · JPL
94307	2001 FJ_{13}	—	March 19, 2001	Anderson Mesa	LONEOS	·	6.2 km	MPC · JPL
94308	2001 FD_{15}	—	March 19, 2001	Anderson Mesa	LONEOS	CYB	7.4 km	MPC · JPL
94309	2001 FX_{33}	—	March 18, 2001	Socorro	LINEAR	·	8.2 km	MPC · JPL
94310	2001 FJ_{34}	—	March 18, 2001	Socorro	LINEAR	·	2.7 km	MPC · JPL
94311	2001 FG_{35}	—	March 18, 2001	Socorro	LINEAR	·	6.6 km	MPC · JPL
94312	2001 FP_{37}	—	March 18, 2001	Socorro	LINEAR	·	11 km	MPC · JPL
94313	2001 FE_{41}	—	March 18, 2001	Socorro	LINEAR	EUP	12 km	MPC · JPL
94314	2001 FV_{49}	—	March 18, 2001	Socorro	LINEAR	TIR	6.7 km	MPC · JPL
94315	2001 FA_{59}	—	March 19, 2001	Socorro	LINEAR	·	6.1 km	MPC · JPL
94316	2001 FY_{63}	—	March 19, 2001	Socorro	LINEAR	EOS	13 km	MPC · JPL
94317	2001 FG_{64}	—	March 19, 2001	Socorro	LINEAR	·	6.9 km	MPC · JPL
94318	2001 FD_{97}	—	March 16, 2001	Socorro	LINEAR	·	8.0 km	MPC · JPL
94319	2001 FX_{100}	—	March 17, 2001	Prescott	P. G. Comba	·	4.7 km	MPC · JPL
94320	2001 FH_{109}	—	March 18, 2001	Socorro	LINEAR	HYG	7.9 km	MPC · JPL
94321	2001 FA_{111}	—	March 18, 2001	Socorro	LINEAR	HYG	5.7 km	MPC · JPL
94322	2001 FW_{111}	—	March 18, 2001	Socorro	LINEAR	·	6.3 km	MPC · JPL
94323	2001 FS_{121}	—	March 27, 2001	Haleakala	NEAT	EOS	4.6 km	MPC · JPL
94324	2001 FB_{127}	—	March 26, 2001	Socorro	LINEAR	CYB	6.8 km	MPC · JPL
94325	2001 FW_{138}	—	March 21, 2001	Haleakala	NEAT	EOS	4.3 km	MPC · JPL
94326	2001 FW_{139}	—	March 21, 2001	Haleakala	NEAT	TIR	7.1 km	MPC · JPL
94327	2001 FN_{140}	—	March 21, 2001	Haleakala	NEAT	HYG	7.5 km	MPC · JPL
94328	2001 FQ_{152}	—	March 26, 2001	Socorro	LINEAR	HYG	6.5 km	MPC · JPL
94329	2001 FG_{156}	—	March 26, 2001	Haleakala	NEAT	THM	5.7 km	MPC · JPL
94330	2001 FV_{162}	—	March 18, 2001	Socorro	LINEAR	VER	5.4 km	MPC · JPL
94331	2001 FR_{177}	—	March 18, 2001	Socorro	LINEAR	·	6.9 km	MPC · JPL
94332	2001 KF	—	May 16, 2001	Socorro	LINEAR	H	1.3 km	MPC · JPL
94333	2001 KZ_{52}	—	May 18, 2001	Anderson Mesa	LONEOS	(3025)	10 km	MPC · JPL
94334	2001 OU_{85}	—	July 21, 2001	Anderson Mesa	LONEOS	H	1.6 km	MPC · JPL
94335	2001 OV_{91}	—	July 31, 2001	Palomar	NEAT	H	1.0 km	MPC · JPL
94336	2001 PE_{16}	—	August 9, 2001	Palomar	NEAT	H	790 m	MPC · JPL
94337	2001 QQ_{22}	—	August 16, 2001	Socorro	LINEAR	·	1.6 km	MPC · JPL
94338	2001 QA_{28}	—	August 16, 2001	Socorro	LINEAR	·	3.1 km	MPC · JPL
94339	2001 QY_{60}	—	August 19, 2001	Socorro	LINEAR	H	1.1 km	MPC · JPL
94340	2001 QN_{73}	—	August 19, 2001	Socorro	LINEAR	PHO	1.8 km	MPC · JPL
94341	2001 QM_{74}	—	August 16, 2001	Socorro	LINEAR	·	1.7 km	MPC · JPL
94342	2001 QS_{75}	—	August 16, 2001	Socorro	LINEAR	·	1.9 km	MPC · JPL
94343	2001 QB_{76}	—	August 16, 2001	Socorro	LINEAR	·	2.7 km	MPC · JPL
94344	2001 QN_{83}	—	August 17, 2001	Socorro	LINEAR	·	2.3 km	MPC · JPL
94345	2001 QB_{86}	—	August 17, 2001	Palomar	NEAT	H	1.3 km	MPC · JPL
94346	2001 QU_{88}	—	August 19, 2001	Socorro	LINEAR	PHO	4.7 km	MPC · JPL
94347	2001 QW_{88}	—	August 19, 2001	Socorro	LINEAR	H	1.5 km	MPC · JPL
94348	2001 QL_{93}	—	August 22, 2001	Socorro	LINEAR	·	1.7 km	MPC · JPL
94349	2001 QC_{102}	—	August 18, 2001	Socorro	LINEAR	·	1.8 km	MPC · JPL
94350	2001 QU_{104}	—	August 22, 2001	Socorro	LINEAR	·	1.5 km	MPC · JPL
94351	2001 QA_{107}	—	August 22, 2001	Socorro	LINEAR	H	2.1 km	MPC · JPL
94352	2001 QD_{169}	—	August 26, 2001	Palomar	NEAT	·	1.6 km	MPC · JPL
94353	2001 QY_{169}	—	August 22, 2001	Socorro	LINEAR	·	1.6 km	MPC · JPL
94354	2001 QG_{171}	—	August 25, 2001	Socorro	LINEAR	H	1.0 km	MPC · JPL
94355	2001 QS_{177}	—	August 25, 2001	Palomar	NEAT	V	1.9 km	MPC · JPL
94356 Naruto	2001 QE_{178}	Naruto	August 28, 2001	Kuma Kogen	A. Nakamura	·	2.1 km	MPC · JPL
94357	2001 QZ_{178}	—	August 27, 2001	Palomar	NEAT	·	2.2 km	MPC · JPL
94358	2001 QE_{219}	—	August 23, 2001	Desert Eagle	W. K. Y. Yeung	·	1.4 km	MPC · JPL
94359	2001 QC_{249}	—	August 24, 2001	Socorro	LINEAR	(883)	1.4 km	MPC · JPL
94360	2001 RW_{15}	—	September 8, 2001	Socorro	LINEAR	H	1.4 km	MPC · JPL
94361	2001 RT_{22}	—	September 7, 2001	Socorro	LINEAR	·	1.4 km	MPC · JPL
94362	2001 RS_{46}	—	September 11, 2001	Socorro	LINEAR	H	1.3 km	MPC · JPL
94363	2001 RK_{47}	—	September 12, 2001	Socorro	LINEAR	H	950 m	MPC · JPL
94364	2001 RG_{68}	—	September 10, 2001	Socorro	LINEAR	·	1.5 km	MPC · JPL
94365	2001 RN_{70}	—	September 10, 2001	Socorro	LINEAR	·	1.5 km	MPC · JPL
94366	2001 RS_{70}	—	September 10, 2001	Socorro	LINEAR	slow	1.4 km	MPC · JPL
94367	2001 RK_{72}	—	September 10, 2001	Socorro	LINEAR	·	1.5 km	MPC · JPL
94368	2001 RN_{78}	—	September 10, 2001	Socorro	LINEAR	·	1.3 km	MPC · JPL
94369	2001 RE_{137}	—	September 12, 2001	Socorro	LINEAR	·	1.3 km	MPC · JPL
94370	2001 RA_{148}	—	September 10, 2001	Anderson Mesa	LONEOS	H	1.1 km	MPC · JPL
94371	2001 SZ_{9}	—	September 18, 2001	Desert Eagle	W. K. Y. Yeung	·	1.6 km	MPC · JPL
94372	2001 SH_{11}	—	September 16, 2001	Socorro	LINEAR	·	1.3 km	MPC · JPL
94373	2001 SQ_{29}	—	September 16, 2001	Socorro	LINEAR	·	2.1 km	MPC · JPL
94374	2001 SO_{33}	—	September 16, 2001	Socorro	LINEAR	·	1.3 km	MPC · JPL
94375	2001 SQ_{39}	—	September 16, 2001	Socorro	LINEAR	·	1.2 km	MPC · JPL
94376	2001 SW_{54}	—	September 16, 2001	Socorro	LINEAR	·	2.5 km	MPC · JPL
94377	2001 SR_{61}	—	September 17, 2001	Socorro	LINEAR	·	1.3 km	MPC · JPL
94378	2001 SU_{68}	—	September 17, 2001	Socorro	LINEAR	·	4.2 km	MPC · JPL
94379	2001 SY_{68}	—	September 17, 2001	Socorro	LINEAR	·	2.4 km	MPC · JPL
94380	2001 SD_{69}	—	September 17, 2001	Socorro	LINEAR	·	1.1 km	MPC · JPL
94381	2001 ST_{69}	—	September 17, 2001	Socorro	LINEAR	·	1.7 km	MPC · JPL
94382	2001 SC_{71}	—	September 17, 2001	Socorro	LINEAR	·	1.6 km	MPC · JPL
94383	2001 SO_{71}	—	September 17, 2001	Socorro	LINEAR	·	1.5 km	MPC · JPL
94384	2001 SR_{106}	—	September 20, 2001	Socorro	LINEAR	·	2.7 km	MPC · JPL
94385	2001 SC_{107}	—	September 20, 2001	Socorro	LINEAR	(2076)	3.0 km	MPC · JPL
94386	2001 SL_{108}	—	September 20, 2001	Socorro	LINEAR	·	2.4 km	MPC · JPL
94387	2001 SP_{108}	—	September 20, 2001	Socorro	LINEAR	·	2.1 km	MPC · JPL
94388	2001 SH_{111}	—	September 20, 2001	Socorro	LINEAR	·	2.1 km	MPC · JPL
94389	2001 SJ_{111}	—	September 20, 2001	Socorro	LINEAR	·	3.6 km	MPC · JPL
94390	2001 SW_{112}	—	September 18, 2001	Desert Eagle	W. K. Y. Yeung	BAP	2.6 km	MPC · JPL
94391	2001 SE_{113}	—	September 18, 2001	Desert Eagle	W. K. Y. Yeung	·	1.3 km	MPC · JPL
94392	2001 SU_{133}	—	September 16, 2001	Socorro	LINEAR	·	1.4 km	MPC · JPL
94393	2001 SR_{160}	—	September 17, 2001	Socorro	LINEAR	·	1.9 km	MPC · JPL
94394	2001 SG_{168}	—	September 19, 2001	Socorro	LINEAR	·	1.3 km	MPC · JPL
94395	2001 SR_{168}	—	September 19, 2001	Socorro	LINEAR	·	1.1 km	MPC · JPL
94396	2001 SN_{213}	—	September 19, 2001	Socorro	LINEAR	·	1.4 km	MPC · JPL
94397	2001 ST_{245}	—	September 19, 2001	Socorro	LINEAR	·	1.2 km	MPC · JPL
94398	2001 SH_{254}	—	September 19, 2001	Socorro	LINEAR	·	1.9 km	MPC · JPL
94399	2001 SK_{261}	—	September 20, 2001	Socorro	LINEAR	·	1.8 km	MPC · JPL
94400 Hongdaeyong	2001 SG_{267}	Hongdaeyong	September 25, 2001	Bohyunsan	Jeon, Y.-B., Park, Y.-H., Choo, K.-J.	·	960 m	MPC · JPL

== 94401–94500 ==
back to top

Designation			Discovery			Properties		Ref
Permanent	Provisional	Named after	Date	Site	Discoverer(s)	Category	Diam.	Ref
94401	2001 ST_{270}	—	September 16, 2001	Palomar	NEAT	·	2.6 km	MPC · JPL
94402	2001 SW_{277}	—	September 21, 2001	Anderson Mesa	LONEOS	·	4.6 km	MPC · JPL
94403	2001 SM_{286}	—	September 21, 2001	Palomar	NEAT	V	1.1 km	MPC · JPL
94404	2001 SO_{287}	—	September 30, 2001	Emerald Lane	L. Ball	·	1.2 km	MPC · JPL
94405	2001 SX_{306}	—	September 20, 2001	Socorro	LINEAR	·	870 m	MPC · JPL
94406	2001 SR_{347}	—	September 25, 2001	Socorro	LINEAR	·	1.7 km	MPC · JPL
94407	2001 TC_{6}	—	October 10, 2001	Palomar	NEAT	·	1.5 km	MPC · JPL
94408	2001 TF_{9}	—	October 9, 2001	Socorro	LINEAR	PHO	3.0 km	MPC · JPL
94409	2001 TU_{10}	—	October 13, 2001	Socorro	LINEAR	·	1.2 km	MPC · JPL
94410	2001 TU_{12}	—	October 13, 2001	Socorro	LINEAR	MAS	2.0 km	MPC · JPL
94411	2001 TA_{17}	—	October 13, 2001	Ametlla de Mar	J. Nomen	·	1.1 km	MPC · JPL
94412	2001 TM_{18}	—	October 14, 2001	Desert Eagle	W. K. Y. Yeung	NYS	2.9 km	MPC · JPL
94413	2001 TN_{20}	—	October 9, 2001	Socorro	LINEAR	·	2.1 km	MPC · JPL
94414	2001 TX_{23}	—	October 14, 2001	Socorro	LINEAR	NYS	3.0 km	MPC · JPL
94415	2001 TY_{28}	—	October 14, 2001	Socorro	LINEAR	·	1.6 km	MPC · JPL
94416	2001 TZ_{28}	—	October 14, 2001	Socorro	LINEAR	slow	2.4 km	MPC · JPL
94417	2001 TL_{31}	—	October 14, 2001	Socorro	LINEAR	·	1.8 km	MPC · JPL
94418	2001 TJ_{32}	—	October 14, 2001	Socorro	LINEAR	V	1.4 km	MPC · JPL
94419	2001 TE_{33}	—	October 14, 2001	Socorro	LINEAR	·	1.8 km	MPC · JPL
94420	2001 TO_{33}	—	October 14, 2001	Socorro	LINEAR	·	1.7 km	MPC · JPL
94421	2001 TY_{33}	—	October 14, 2001	Socorro	LINEAR	V	1.3 km	MPC · JPL
94422	2001 TY_{36}	—	October 14, 2001	Socorro	LINEAR	·	2.1 km	MPC · JPL
94423	2001 TR_{37}	—	October 14, 2001	Socorro	LINEAR	·	1.7 km	MPC · JPL
94424	2001 TW_{39}	—	October 14, 2001	Socorro	LINEAR	·	1.5 km	MPC · JPL
94425	2001 TD_{40}	—	October 14, 2001	Socorro	LINEAR	V	2.5 km	MPC · JPL
94426	2001 TF_{40}	—	October 14, 2001	Socorro	LINEAR	·	2.3 km	MPC · JPL
94427	2001 TG_{40}	—	October 14, 2001	Socorro	LINEAR	·	2.3 km	MPC · JPL
94428	2001 TH_{40}	—	October 14, 2001	Socorro	LINEAR	·	1.8 km	MPC · JPL
94429	2001 TK_{41}	—	October 14, 2001	Socorro	LINEAR	·	1.9 km	MPC · JPL
94430	2001 TM_{41}	—	October 14, 2001	Socorro	LINEAR	EUN	3.8 km	MPC · JPL
94431	2001 TZ_{41}	—	October 14, 2001	Socorro	LINEAR	V	1.6 km	MPC · JPL
94432	2001 TC_{43}	—	October 14, 2001	Socorro	LINEAR	BAP	2.8 km	MPC · JPL
94433	2001 TL_{44}	—	October 14, 2001	Socorro	LINEAR	·	2.9 km	MPC · JPL
94434	2001 TN_{44}	—	October 14, 2001	Socorro	LINEAR	·	2.1 km	MPC · JPL
94435	2001 TS_{44}	—	October 14, 2001	Socorro	LINEAR	·	3.0 km	MPC · JPL
94436	2001 TP_{46}	—	October 15, 2001	Socorro	LINEAR	PHO	2.1 km	MPC · JPL
94437	2001 TO_{53}	—	October 13, 2001	Socorro	LINEAR	·	1.4 km	MPC · JPL
94438	2001 TV_{62}	—	October 13, 2001	Socorro	LINEAR	·	1.3 km	MPC · JPL
94439	2001 TY_{62}	—	October 13, 2001	Socorro	LINEAR	·	1.4 km	MPC · JPL
94440	2001 TH_{65}	—	October 13, 2001	Socorro	LINEAR	·	3.2 km	MPC · JPL
94441	2001 TL_{68}	—	October 13, 2001	Socorro	LINEAR	·	1.4 km	MPC · JPL
94442	2001 TL_{72}	—	October 13, 2001	Socorro	LINEAR	·	1.1 km	MPC · JPL
94443	2001 TD_{76}	—	October 13, 2001	Socorro	LINEAR	·	1.6 km	MPC · JPL
94444	2001 TK_{76}	—	October 13, 2001	Socorro	LINEAR	·	1.9 km	MPC · JPL
94445	2001 TM_{79}	—	October 13, 2001	Socorro	LINEAR	·	1.4 km	MPC · JPL
94446	2001 TE_{90}	—	October 14, 2001	Socorro	LINEAR	·	1.6 km	MPC · JPL
94447	2001 TQ_{94}	—	October 14, 2001	Socorro	LINEAR	·	1.6 km	MPC · JPL
94448	2001 TV_{96}	—	October 14, 2001	Socorro	LINEAR	·	1.7 km	MPC · JPL
94449	2001 TJ_{101}	—	October 14, 2001	Socorro	LINEAR	·	1.3 km	MPC · JPL
94450	2001 TG_{103}	—	October 13, 2001	Socorro	LINEAR	·	1.6 km	MPC · JPL
94451	2001 TD_{105}	—	October 13, 2001	Socorro	LINEAR	·	1.3 km	MPC · JPL
94452	2001 TV_{105}	—	October 13, 2001	Socorro	LINEAR	·	2.9 km	MPC · JPL
94453	2001 TD_{106}	—	October 13, 2001	Socorro	LINEAR	·	1.5 km	MPC · JPL
94454	2001 TG_{106}	—	October 13, 2001	Socorro	LINEAR	·	3.7 km	MPC · JPL
94455	2001 TD_{107}	—	October 13, 2001	Socorro	LINEAR	·	2.4 km	MPC · JPL
94456	2001 TY_{107}	—	October 13, 2001	Socorro	LINEAR	NYS	3.0 km	MPC · JPL
94457	2001 TC_{111}	—	October 14, 2001	Socorro	LINEAR	·	1.7 km	MPC · JPL
94458	2001 TQ_{111}	—	October 14, 2001	Socorro	LINEAR	·	1.6 km	MPC · JPL
94459	2001 TU_{113}	—	October 14, 2001	Socorro	LINEAR	·	4.1 km	MPC · JPL
94460	2001 TC_{114}	—	October 14, 2001	Socorro	LINEAR	·	1.3 km	MPC · JPL
94461	2001 TN_{116}	—	October 14, 2001	Socorro	LINEAR	·	2.1 km	MPC · JPL
94462	2001 TR_{126}	—	October 13, 2001	Kitt Peak	Spacewatch	·	1.6 km	MPC · JPL
94463	2001 TH_{127}	—	October 12, 2001	Bergisch Gladbach	W. Bickel	·	3.1 km	MPC · JPL
94464	2001 TM_{127}	—	October 12, 2001	Anderson Mesa	LONEOS	·	1.1 km	MPC · JPL
94465	2001 TB_{152}	—	October 10, 2001	Palomar	NEAT	·	4.4 km	MPC · JPL
94466	2001 TH_{155}	—	October 13, 2001	Kitt Peak	Spacewatch	NYS ·	3.9 km	MPC · JPL
94467	2001 TS_{164}	—	October 11, 2001	Palomar	NEAT	·	910 m	MPC · JPL
94468	2001 TS_{165}	—	October 14, 2001	Socorro	LINEAR	·	2.2 km	MPC · JPL
94469	2001 TC_{166}	—	October 14, 2001	Socorro	LINEAR	V	1.4 km	MPC · JPL
94470	2001 TB_{169}	—	October 15, 2001	Socorro	LINEAR	·	1.6 km	MPC · JPL
94471	2001 TD_{178}	—	October 14, 2001	Socorro	LINEAR	·	1.4 km	MPC · JPL
94472	2001 TD_{183}	—	October 14, 2001	Socorro	LINEAR	·	1.6 km	MPC · JPL
94473	2001 TP_{188}	—	October 14, 2001	Socorro	LINEAR	·	1.5 km	MPC · JPL
94474	2001 TR_{189}	—	October 14, 2001	Socorro	LINEAR	·	1.8 km	MPC · JPL
94475	2001 TJ_{190}	—	October 14, 2001	Socorro	LINEAR	·	1.4 km	MPC · JPL
94476	2001 TT_{190}	—	October 14, 2001	Socorro	LINEAR	·	1.9 km	MPC · JPL
94477	2001 TF_{192}	—	October 14, 2001	Socorro	LINEAR	·	3.2 km	MPC · JPL
94478	2001 TV_{194}	—	October 15, 2001	Socorro	LINEAR	·	2.0 km	MPC · JPL
94479	2001 TV_{224}	—	October 14, 2001	Socorro	LINEAR	·	2.2 km	MPC · JPL
94480	2001 UN_{4}	—	October 17, 2001	Desert Eagle	W. K. Y. Yeung	·	4.5 km	MPC · JPL
94481	2001 UO_{4}	—	October 17, 2001	Desert Eagle	W. K. Y. Yeung	V	1.0 km	MPC · JPL
94482	2001 UV_{6}	—	October 18, 2001	Desert Eagle	W. K. Y. Yeung	·	3.1 km	MPC · JPL
94483	2001 UP_{10}	—	October 21, 2001	Desert Eagle	W. K. Y. Yeung	·	1.8 km	MPC · JPL
94484	2001 UR_{10}	—	October 21, 2001	Desert Eagle	W. K. Y. Yeung	·	2.2 km	MPC · JPL
94485	2001 UU_{11}	—	October 23, 2001	Desert Eagle	W. K. Y. Yeung	·	1.7 km	MPC · JPL
94486	2001 UV_{11}	—	October 23, 2001	Desert Eagle	W. K. Y. Yeung	·	1.6 km	MPC · JPL
94487	2001 UA_{14}	—	October 24, 2001	Desert Eagle	W. K. Y. Yeung	·	1.6 km	MPC · JPL
94488	2001 UW_{23}	—	October 18, 2001	Socorro	LINEAR	·	2.5 km	MPC · JPL
94489	2001 UN_{33}	—	October 16, 2001	Socorro	LINEAR	·	2.5 km	MPC · JPL
94490	2001 UO_{34}	—	October 16, 2001	Socorro	LINEAR	V	1.8 km	MPC · JPL
94491	2001 UF_{36}	—	October 16, 2001	Socorro	LINEAR	·	2.7 km	MPC · JPL
94492	2001 UV_{36}	—	October 16, 2001	Socorro	LINEAR	·	1.7 km	MPC · JPL
94493	2001 UB_{42}	—	October 17, 2001	Socorro	LINEAR	·	1.6 km	MPC · JPL
94494	2001 UG_{46}	—	October 17, 2001	Socorro	LINEAR	·	1.3 km	MPC · JPL
94495	2001 US_{46}	—	October 17, 2001	Socorro	LINEAR	·	2.3 km	MPC · JPL
94496	2001 UW_{48}	—	October 17, 2001	Socorro	LINEAR	V	1.2 km	MPC · JPL
94497	2001 UB_{50}	—	October 17, 2001	Socorro	LINEAR	·	2.0 km	MPC · JPL
94498	2001 UM_{50}	—	October 17, 2001	Socorro	LINEAR	·	1.5 km	MPC · JPL
94499	2001 UB_{51}	—	October 17, 2001	Socorro	LINEAR	·	1.2 km	MPC · JPL
94500	2001 US_{51}	—	October 17, 2001	Socorro	LINEAR	·	1.8 km	MPC · JPL

== 94501–94600 ==
back to top

Designation			Discovery			Properties		Ref
Permanent	Provisional	Named after	Date	Site	Discoverer(s)	Category	Diam.	Ref
94501	2001 UN_{56}	—	October 17, 2001	Socorro	LINEAR	·	940 m	MPC · JPL
94502	2001 UV_{59}	—	October 17, 2001	Socorro	LINEAR	·	1.5 km	MPC · JPL
94503	2001 UW_{64}	—	October 18, 2001	Socorro	LINEAR	·	1.7 km	MPC · JPL
94504	2001 UE_{65}	—	October 18, 2001	Socorro	LINEAR	·	1.4 km	MPC · JPL
94505	2001 UF_{67}	—	October 20, 2001	Socorro	LINEAR	·	940 m	MPC · JPL
94506	2001 UX_{74}	—	October 17, 2001	Socorro	LINEAR	·	1.4 km	MPC · JPL
94507	2001 UC_{75}	—	October 17, 2001	Socorro	LINEAR	(883)	1.1 km	MPC · JPL
94508	2001 UL_{76}	—	October 17, 2001	Socorro	LINEAR	·	1.3 km	MPC · JPL
94509	2001 UF_{81}	—	October 20, 2001	Socorro	LINEAR	·	2.2 km	MPC · JPL
94510	2001 UO_{82}	—	October 20, 2001	Socorro	LINEAR	·	3.4 km	MPC · JPL
94511	2001 UA_{84}	—	October 20, 2001	Socorro	LINEAR	V	1.2 km	MPC · JPL
94512	2001 US_{90}	—	October 21, 2001	Kitt Peak	Spacewatch	·	2.4 km	MPC · JPL
94513	2001 UC_{99}	—	October 17, 2001	Socorro	LINEAR	·	1.8 km	MPC · JPL
94514	2001 UZ_{105}	—	October 20, 2001	Socorro	LINEAR	NYS	1.5 km	MPC · JPL
94515	2001 UQ_{107}	—	October 20, 2001	Socorro	LINEAR	·	1.6 km	MPC · JPL
94516	2001 UA_{109}	—	October 20, 2001	Socorro	LINEAR	·	1.6 km	MPC · JPL
94517	2001 UH_{109}	—	October 20, 2001	Socorro	LINEAR	·	1.9 km	MPC · JPL
94518	2001 UQ_{109}	—	October 20, 2001	Socorro	LINEAR	V	1.1 km	MPC · JPL
94519	2001 UY_{110}	—	October 21, 2001	Socorro	LINEAR	·	1.8 km	MPC · JPL
94520	2001 UF_{112}	—	October 21, 2001	Socorro	LINEAR	·	1.5 km	MPC · JPL
94521	2001 UA_{113}	—	October 21, 2001	Socorro	LINEAR	·	2.0 km	MPC · JPL
94522	2001 UH_{113}	—	October 21, 2001	Socorro	LINEAR	·	1.1 km	MPC · JPL
94523	2001 UM_{121}	—	October 22, 2001	Socorro	LINEAR	V	1.6 km	MPC · JPL
94524	2001 UR_{121}	—	October 22, 2001	Socorro	LINEAR	·	1.8 km	MPC · JPL
94525	2001 UV_{122}	—	October 22, 2001	Socorro	LINEAR	V	1.8 km	MPC · JPL
94526	2001 UL_{130}	—	October 20, 2001	Socorro	LINEAR	·	1.2 km	MPC · JPL
94527	2001 UA_{136}	—	October 22, 2001	Socorro	LINEAR	·	3.6 km	MPC · JPL
94528	2001 UO_{142}	—	October 23, 2001	Socorro	LINEAR	·	1.3 km	MPC · JPL
94529	2001 UK_{145}	—	October 23, 2001	Socorro	LINEAR	·	1.2 km	MPC · JPL
94530	2001 US_{146}	—	October 23, 2001	Socorro	LINEAR	NYS	2.8 km	MPC · JPL
94531	2001 UZ_{152}	—	October 23, 2001	Socorro	LINEAR	·	1.6 km	MPC · JPL
94532	2001 UZ_{154}	—	October 23, 2001	Socorro	LINEAR	·	1.0 km	MPC · JPL
94533	2001 UD_{155}	—	October 23, 2001	Socorro	LINEAR	·	3.3 km	MPC · JPL
94534	2001 UB_{156}	—	October 23, 2001	Socorro	LINEAR	·	1.4 km	MPC · JPL
94535	2001 UA_{157}	—	October 23, 2001	Socorro	LINEAR	·	930 m	MPC · JPL
94536	2001 UV_{157}	—	October 23, 2001	Socorro	LINEAR	V	1.3 km	MPC · JPL
94537	2001 UV_{158}	—	October 23, 2001	Socorro	LINEAR	·	1.6 km	MPC · JPL
94538	2001 UQ_{160}	—	October 23, 2001	Socorro	LINEAR	·	3.0 km	MPC · JPL
94539	2001 US_{164}	—	October 19, 2001	Palomar	NEAT	·	1.6 km	MPC · JPL
94540	2001 UF_{171}	—	October 21, 2001	Socorro	LINEAR	·	1.5 km	MPC · JPL
94541	2001 UF_{172}	—	October 18, 2001	Palomar	NEAT	·	1.4 km	MPC · JPL
94542	2001 UK_{172}	—	October 18, 2001	Palomar	NEAT	NYS	2.3 km	MPC · JPL
94543	2001 UX_{174}	—	October 19, 2001	Palomar	NEAT	·	1.2 km	MPC · JPL
94544	2001 UB_{179}	—	October 24, 2001	Palomar	NEAT	·	1.4 km	MPC · JPL
94545	2001 UU_{188}	—	October 17, 2001	Kitt Peak	Spacewatch	·	1.6 km	MPC · JPL
94546	2001 UY_{202}	—	October 19, 2001	Palomar	NEAT	·	1.1 km	MPC · JPL
94547	2001 UD_{205}	—	October 19, 2001	Palomar	NEAT	·	3.2 km	MPC · JPL
94548	2001 VP_{4}	—	November 10, 2001	Socorro	LINEAR	·	1.4 km	MPC · JPL
94549	2001 VV_{5}	—	November 9, 2001	Socorro	LINEAR	·	1.4 km	MPC · JPL
94550	2001 VM_{13}	—	November 10, 2001	Socorro	LINEAR	PHO	2.4 km	MPC · JPL
94551	2001 VQ_{13}	—	November 10, 2001	Socorro	LINEAR	·	1.1 km	MPC · JPL
94552	2001 VR_{13}	—	November 10, 2001	Socorro	LINEAR	·	4.9 km	MPC · JPL
94553	2001 VA_{14}	—	November 10, 2001	Socorro	LINEAR	·	1.9 km	MPC · JPL
94554	2001 VN_{14}	—	November 10, 2001	Socorro	LINEAR	·	2.2 km	MPC · JPL
94555	2001 VR_{14}	—	November 10, 2001	Socorro	LINEAR	·	2.0 km	MPC · JPL
94556 Janstarý	2001 VG_{17}	Janstarý	November 11, 2001	Ondřejov	P. Pravec, P. Kušnirák	·	1.7 km	MPC · JPL
94557	2001 VQ_{18}	—	November 9, 2001	Socorro	LINEAR	·	1.5 km	MPC · JPL
94558	2001 VP_{21}	—	November 9, 2001	Socorro	LINEAR	V	2.0 km	MPC · JPL
94559	2001 VV_{22}	—	November 9, 2001	Socorro	LINEAR	·	2.6 km	MPC · JPL
94560	2001 VN_{23}	—	November 9, 2001	Socorro	LINEAR	V	2.2 km	MPC · JPL
94561	2001 VT_{24}	—	November 9, 2001	Socorro	LINEAR	·	1.4 km	MPC · JPL
94562	2001 VJ_{28}	—	November 9, 2001	Socorro	LINEAR	NYS	2.7 km	MPC · JPL
94563	2001 VY_{29}	—	November 9, 2001	Socorro	LINEAR	·	4.3 km	MPC · JPL
94564	2001 VT_{30}	—	November 9, 2001	Socorro	LINEAR	·	1.2 km	MPC · JPL
94565	2001 VH_{32}	—	November 9, 2001	Socorro	LINEAR	NYS ·	4.0 km	MPC · JPL
94566	2001 VP_{34}	—	November 9, 2001	Socorro	LINEAR	·	3.0 km	MPC · JPL
94567	2001 VD_{35}	—	November 9, 2001	Socorro	LINEAR	·	2.7 km	MPC · JPL
94568	2001 VM_{39}	—	November 9, 2001	Socorro	LINEAR	·	1.3 km	MPC · JPL
94569	2001 VF_{42}	—	November 9, 2001	Socorro	LINEAR	·	2.8 km	MPC · JPL
94570	2001 VG_{42}	—	November 9, 2001	Socorro	LINEAR	·	2.5 km	MPC · JPL
94571	2001 VP_{42}	—	November 9, 2001	Socorro	LINEAR	·	2.7 km	MPC · JPL
94572	2001 VQ_{42}	—	November 9, 2001	Socorro	LINEAR	·	1.4 km	MPC · JPL
94573	2001 VW_{42}	—	November 9, 2001	Socorro	LINEAR	·	1.6 km	MPC · JPL
94574	2001 VM_{43}	—	November 9, 2001	Socorro	LINEAR	V	1.6 km	MPC · JPL
94575	2001 VV_{44}	—	November 9, 2001	Socorro	LINEAR	·	2.1 km	MPC · JPL
94576	2001 VZ_{44}	—	November 9, 2001	Socorro	LINEAR	·	1.8 km	MPC · JPL
94577	2001 VU_{45}	—	November 9, 2001	Socorro	LINEAR	PHO	4.2 km	MPC · JPL
94578	2001 VB_{46}	—	November 9, 2001	Socorro	LINEAR	·	2.5 km	MPC · JPL
94579	2001 VE_{46}	—	November 9, 2001	Socorro	LINEAR	·	2.2 km	MPC · JPL
94580	2001 VN_{46}	—	November 9, 2001	Socorro	LINEAR	·	4.3 km	MPC · JPL
94581	2001 VQ_{46}	—	November 9, 2001	Socorro	LINEAR	NYS	3.0 km	MPC · JPL
94582	2001 VW_{46}	—	November 9, 2001	Socorro	LINEAR	·	2.2 km	MPC · JPL
94583	2001 VG_{47}	—	November 9, 2001	Socorro	LINEAR	·	4.0 km	MPC · JPL
94584	2001 VL_{47}	—	November 9, 2001	Socorro	LINEAR	·	2.1 km	MPC · JPL
94585	2001 VW_{47}	—	November 9, 2001	Socorro	LINEAR	·	1.6 km	MPC · JPL
94586	2001 VM_{48}	—	November 9, 2001	Socorro	LINEAR	·	1.3 km	MPC · JPL
94587	2001 VH_{53}	—	November 10, 2001	Socorro	LINEAR	·	1.8 km	MPC · JPL
94588	2001 VX_{57}	—	November 10, 2001	Socorro	LINEAR	·	1.6 km	MPC · JPL
94589	2001 VZ_{57}	—	November 10, 2001	Socorro	LINEAR	·	1.7 km	MPC · JPL
94590	2001 VP_{58}	—	November 10, 2001	Socorro	LINEAR	·	1.5 km	MPC · JPL
94591	2001 VS_{59}	—	November 10, 2001	Socorro	LINEAR	·	1.6 km	MPC · JPL
94592	2001 VV_{60}	—	November 10, 2001	Socorro	LINEAR	·	1.5 km	MPC · JPL
94593	2001 VX_{61}	—	November 10, 2001	Socorro	LINEAR	·	1.8 km	MPC · JPL
94594	2001 VU_{63}	—	November 10, 2001	Socorro	LINEAR	·	1.9 km	MPC · JPL
94595	2001 VT_{65}	—	November 10, 2001	Socorro	LINEAR	·	4.2 km	MPC · JPL
94596	2001 VW_{71}	—	November 14, 2001	Ondřejov	P. Kušnirák, P. Pravec	·	1.1 km	MPC · JPL
94597	2001 VT_{72}	—	November 12, 2001	Kitt Peak	Spacewatch	·	2.8 km	MPC · JPL
94598	2001 VU_{72}	—	November 12, 2001	Kitt Peak	Spacewatch	NYS	1.7 km	MPC · JPL
94599	2001 VY_{79}	—	November 9, 2001	Palomar	NEAT	V · slow?	2.0 km	MPC · JPL
94600	2001 VE_{80}	—	November 9, 2001	Palomar	NEAT	·	1.9 km	MPC · JPL

== 94601–94700 ==
back to top

Designation			Discovery			Properties		Ref
Permanent	Provisional	Named after	Date	Site	Discoverer(s)	Category	Diam.	Ref
94601	2001 VY_{81}	—	November 12, 2001	Socorro	LINEAR	·	1.7 km	MPC · JPL
94602	2001 VX_{82}	—	November 10, 2001	Socorro	LINEAR	·	1.5 km	MPC · JPL
94603	2001 VD_{84}	—	November 11, 2001	Socorro	LINEAR	·	1.1 km	MPC · JPL
94604	2001 VN_{100}	—	November 12, 2001	Anderson Mesa	LONEOS	·	1.3 km	MPC · JPL
94605	2001 VA_{101}	—	November 12, 2001	Socorro	LINEAR	·	1.5 km	MPC · JPL
94606	2001 VT_{104}	—	November 12, 2001	Socorro	LINEAR	·	1.1 km	MPC · JPL
94607	2001 VC_{109}	—	November 12, 2001	Socorro	LINEAR	·	2.1 km	MPC · JPL
94608	2001 VR_{109}	—	November 12, 2001	Socorro	LINEAR	·	1.5 km	MPC · JPL
94609	2001 VE_{110}	—	November 12, 2001	Socorro	LINEAR	·	1.8 km	MPC · JPL
94610	2001 VQ_{110}	—	November 12, 2001	Socorro	LINEAR	·	2.8 km	MPC · JPL
94611	2001 VK_{112}	—	November 12, 2001	Socorro	LINEAR	·	1.8 km	MPC · JPL
94612	2001 VU_{112}	—	November 12, 2001	Socorro	LINEAR	·	1.4 km	MPC · JPL
94613	2001 VQ_{114}	—	November 12, 2001	Socorro	LINEAR	·	1.1 km	MPC · JPL
94614	2001 VM_{116}	—	November 12, 2001	Socorro	LINEAR	·	2.0 km	MPC · JPL
94615	2001 VX_{116}	—	November 12, 2001	Socorro	LINEAR	·	2.1 km	MPC · JPL
94616	2001 VM_{117}	—	November 12, 2001	Socorro	LINEAR	·	2.2 km	MPC · JPL
94617	2001 VB_{118}	—	November 12, 2001	Socorro	LINEAR	·	1.4 km	MPC · JPL
94618	2001 VK_{118}	—	November 12, 2001	Socorro	LINEAR	·	1.1 km	MPC · JPL
94619	2001 VQ_{119}	—	November 12, 2001	Socorro	LINEAR	·	3.7 km	MPC · JPL
94620	2001 VK_{122}	—	November 13, 2001	Haleakala	NEAT	EUN	3.4 km	MPC · JPL
94621	2001 VM_{124}	—	November 9, 2001	Socorro	LINEAR	·	2.1 km	MPC · JPL
94622	2001 WL_{1}	—	November 17, 2001	Oizumi	T. Kobayashi	·	1.8 km	MPC · JPL
94623	2001 WD_{2}	—	November 19, 2001	Socorro	LINEAR	·	2.9 km	MPC · JPL
94624	2001 WJ_{3}	—	November 16, 2001	Kitt Peak	Spacewatch	NYS	2.2 km	MPC · JPL
94625	2001 WE_{5}	—	November 20, 2001	Socorro	LINEAR	·	1.3 km	MPC · JPL
94626	2001 WN_{7}	—	November 17, 2001	Socorro	LINEAR	·	1.7 km	MPC · JPL
94627	2001 WJ_{9}	—	November 17, 2001	Socorro	LINEAR	·	2.0 km	MPC · JPL
94628	2001 WV_{10}	—	November 17, 2001	Socorro	LINEAR	·	1.3 km	MPC · JPL
94629	2001 WG_{11}	—	November 17, 2001	Socorro	LINEAR	·	1.3 km	MPC · JPL
94630	2001 WJ_{12}	—	November 17, 2001	Socorro	LINEAR	slow	1.5 km	MPC · JPL
94631	2001 WK_{12}	—	November 17, 2001	Socorro	LINEAR	·	2.3 km	MPC · JPL
94632	2001 WC_{13}	—	November 17, 2001	Socorro	LINEAR	·	1.4 km	MPC · JPL
94633	2001 WX_{13}	—	November 17, 2001	Socorro	LINEAR	·	1.6 km	MPC · JPL
94634	2001 WQ_{14}	—	November 21, 2001	San Marcello	L. Tesi, M. Tombelli	·	1.8 km	MPC · JPL
94635	2001 WX_{17}	—	November 17, 2001	Socorro	LINEAR	·	1.6 km	MPC · JPL
94636	2001 WD_{18}	—	November 17, 2001	Socorro	LINEAR	·	1.7 km	MPC · JPL
94637	2001 WY_{23}	—	November 17, 2001	Kitt Peak	Spacewatch	NYS ·	4.1 km	MPC · JPL
94638	2001 WQ_{27}	—	November 17, 2001	Socorro	LINEAR	·	1.2 km	MPC · JPL
94639	2001 WH_{28}	—	November 17, 2001	Socorro	LINEAR	·	1.8 km	MPC · JPL
94640	2001 WL_{28}	—	November 17, 2001	Socorro	LINEAR	·	1.1 km	MPC · JPL
94641	2001 WA_{35}	—	November 17, 2001	Socorro	LINEAR	·	2.1 km	MPC · JPL
94642	2001 WE_{39}	—	November 17, 2001	Socorro	LINEAR	·	2.0 km	MPC · JPL
94643	2001 WJ_{39}	—	November 17, 2001	Socorro	LINEAR	·	1.9 km	MPC · JPL
94644	2001 WK_{39}	—	November 17, 2001	Socorro	LINEAR	·	1.7 km	MPC · JPL
94645	2001 WW_{40}	—	November 17, 2001	Socorro	LINEAR	·	3.5 km	MPC · JPL
94646	2001 WH_{41}	—	November 17, 2001	Socorro	LINEAR	·	2.9 km	MPC · JPL
94647	2001 WL_{44}	—	November 18, 2001	Socorro	LINEAR	·	2.4 km	MPC · JPL
94648	2001 WA_{47}	—	November 20, 2001	Socorro	LINEAR	·	2.3 km	MPC · JPL
94649	2001 WJ_{47}	—	November 16, 2001	Palomar	NEAT	·	2.1 km	MPC · JPL
94650	2001 WK_{47}	—	November 17, 2001	Haleakala	NEAT	V	2.7 km	MPC · JPL
94651	2001 WL_{63}	—	November 19, 2001	Socorro	LINEAR	·	1.5 km	MPC · JPL
94652	2001 WN_{63}	—	November 19, 2001	Socorro	LINEAR	·	1.5 km	MPC · JPL
94653	2001 WF_{67}	—	November 20, 2001	Socorro	LINEAR	MAS	1.4 km	MPC · JPL
94654	2001 WZ_{73}	—	November 20, 2001	Socorro	LINEAR	MAS	1.5 km	MPC · JPL
94655	2001 WE_{75}	—	November 20, 2001	Socorro	LINEAR	·	2.3 km	MPC · JPL
94656	2001 WJ_{76}	—	November 20, 2001	Socorro	LINEAR	·	2.1 km	MPC · JPL
94657	2001 WZ_{89}	—	November 21, 2001	Socorro	LINEAR	·	1.8 km	MPC · JPL
94658	2001 WL_{90}	—	November 21, 2001	Socorro	LINEAR	V	1.4 km	MPC · JPL
94659	2001 WU_{90}	—	November 21, 2001	Socorro	LINEAR	·	2.1 km	MPC · JPL
94660	2001 WY_{91}	—	November 21, 2001	Socorro	LINEAR	·	1.2 km	MPC · JPL
94661	2001 WQ_{98}	—	November 19, 2001	Socorro	LINEAR	NYS	2.1 km	MPC · JPL
94662	2001 WF_{100}	—	November 24, 2001	Socorro	LINEAR	·	1.6 km	MPC · JPL
94663	2001 WK_{101}	—	November 17, 2001	Socorro	LINEAR	V	1.1 km	MPC · JPL
94664	2001 XC_{3}	—	December 9, 2001	Socorro	LINEAR	·	1.4 km	MPC · JPL
94665	2001 XA_{7}	—	December 6, 2001	Socorro	LINEAR	·	1.4 km	MPC · JPL
94666	2001 XS_{9}	—	December 9, 2001	Socorro	LINEAR	V	1.3 km	MPC · JPL
94667	2001 XG_{13}	—	December 9, 2001	Socorro	LINEAR	·	2.5 km	MPC · JPL
94668	2001 XM_{14}	—	December 9, 2001	Socorro	LINEAR	KON	4.7 km	MPC · JPL
94669	2001 XE_{16}	—	December 10, 2001	Socorro	LINEAR	MAS	1.9 km	MPC · JPL
94670	2001 XZ_{16}	—	December 9, 2001	Socorro	LINEAR	(2076)	2.7 km	MPC · JPL
94671	2001 XW_{17}	—	December 9, 2001	Socorro	LINEAR	·	1.5 km	MPC · JPL
94672	2001 XJ_{18}	—	December 9, 2001	Socorro	LINEAR	·	2.8 km	MPC · JPL
94673	2001 XP_{19}	—	December 9, 2001	Socorro	LINEAR	·	3.4 km	MPC · JPL
94674	2001 XK_{21}	—	December 9, 2001	Socorro	LINEAR	·	2.6 km	MPC · JPL
94675	2001 XL_{21}	—	December 9, 2001	Socorro	LINEAR	·	2.6 km	MPC · JPL
94676	2001 XN_{21}	—	December 9, 2001	Socorro	LINEAR	·	2.4 km	MPC · JPL
94677	2001 XQ_{22}	—	December 9, 2001	Socorro	LINEAR	·	1.6 km	MPC · JPL
94678	2001 XB_{23}	—	December 9, 2001	Socorro	LINEAR	·	1.4 km	MPC · JPL
94679	2001 XO_{23}	—	December 9, 2001	Socorro	LINEAR	·	2.4 km	MPC · JPL
94680	2001 XY_{23}	—	December 9, 2001	Socorro	LINEAR	·	3.1 km	MPC · JPL
94681	2001 XA_{24}	—	December 10, 2001	Socorro	LINEAR	·	4.1 km	MPC · JPL
94682	2001 XN_{24}	—	December 10, 2001	Socorro	LINEAR	·	2.0 km	MPC · JPL
94683	2001 XB_{25}	—	December 10, 2001	Socorro	LINEAR	PHO	4.7 km	MPC · JPL
94684	2001 XF_{25}	—	December 10, 2001	Socorro	LINEAR	·	1.5 km	MPC · JPL
94685	2001 XJ_{25}	—	December 10, 2001	Socorro	LINEAR	·	2.2 km	MPC · JPL
94686	2001 XO_{25}	—	December 10, 2001	Socorro	LINEAR	·	4.3 km	MPC · JPL
94687	2001 XW_{25}	—	December 10, 2001	Socorro	LINEAR	EUN	4.1 km	MPC · JPL
94688	2001 XL_{27}	—	December 10, 2001	Socorro	LINEAR	PHO	2.9 km	MPC · JPL
94689	2001 XQ_{27}	—	December 10, 2001	Socorro	LINEAR	·	2.0 km	MPC · JPL
94690	2001 XH_{28}	—	December 10, 2001	Socorro	LINEAR	·	2.9 km	MPC · JPL
94691	2001 XG_{29}	—	December 11, 2001	Socorro	LINEAR	·	2.5 km	MPC · JPL
94692	2001 XB_{30}	—	December 11, 2001	Socorro	LINEAR	·	3.6 km	MPC · JPL
94693	2001 XY_{31}	—	December 10, 2001	Socorro	LINEAR	·	4.0 km	MPC · JPL
94694	2001 XF_{35}	—	December 9, 2001	Socorro	LINEAR	V	1.2 km	MPC · JPL
94695	2001 XN_{35}	—	December 9, 2001	Socorro	LINEAR	HNS	3.6 km	MPC · JPL
94696	2001 XR_{35}	—	December 9, 2001	Socorro	LINEAR	·	1.5 km	MPC · JPL
94697	2001 XV_{40}	—	December 9, 2001	Socorro	LINEAR	·	1.7 km	MPC · JPL
94698	2001 XN_{41}	—	December 9, 2001	Socorro	LINEAR	·	2.0 km	MPC · JPL
94699	2001 XH_{43}	—	December 9, 2001	Socorro	LINEAR	·	3.1 km	MPC · JPL
94700	2001 XQ_{50}	—	December 11, 2001	Socorro	LINEAR	·	1.5 km	MPC · JPL

== 94701–94800 ==
back to top

Designation			Discovery			Properties		Ref
Permanent	Provisional	Named after	Date	Site	Discoverer(s)	Category	Diam.	Ref
94701	2001 XC_{53}	—	December 10, 2001	Socorro	LINEAR	·	2.6 km	MPC · JPL
94702	2001 XU_{53}	—	December 10, 2001	Socorro	LINEAR	·	1.4 km	MPC · JPL
94703	2001 XM_{54}	—	December 10, 2001	Socorro	LINEAR	·	1.5 km	MPC · JPL
94704	2001 XR_{54}	—	December 10, 2001	Socorro	LINEAR	·	2.1 km	MPC · JPL
94705	2001 XK_{55}	—	December 10, 2001	Socorro	LINEAR	·	1.2 km	MPC · JPL
94706	2001 XK_{56}	—	December 10, 2001	Socorro	LINEAR	·	2.9 km	MPC · JPL
94707	2001 XR_{56}	—	December 10, 2001	Socorro	LINEAR	MAS	1.5 km	MPC · JPL
94708	2001 XS_{57}	—	December 10, 2001	Socorro	LINEAR	EUN	2.8 km	MPC · JPL
94709	2001 XD_{58}	—	December 10, 2001	Socorro	LINEAR	·	1.6 km	MPC · JPL
94710	2001 XS_{58}	—	December 10, 2001	Socorro	LINEAR	·	1.4 km	MPC · JPL
94711	2001 XW_{58}	—	December 10, 2001	Socorro	LINEAR	·	2.1 km	MPC · JPL
94712	2001 XU_{59}	—	December 10, 2001	Socorro	LINEAR	·	2.3 km	MPC · JPL
94713	2001 XO_{60}	—	December 10, 2001	Socorro	LINEAR	·	1.7 km	MPC · JPL
94714	2001 XS_{60}	—	December 10, 2001	Socorro	LINEAR	·	2.2 km	MPC · JPL
94715	2001 XS_{61}	—	December 10, 2001	Socorro	LINEAR	NYS	2.6 km	MPC · JPL
94716	2001 XT_{61}	—	December 10, 2001	Socorro	LINEAR	NYS ·	3.8 km	MPC · JPL
94717	2001 XU_{61}	—	December 10, 2001	Socorro	LINEAR	·	2.4 km	MPC · JPL
94718	2001 XV_{61}	—	December 10, 2001	Socorro	LINEAR	·	2.5 km	MPC · JPL
94719	2001 XA_{62}	—	December 10, 2001	Socorro	LINEAR	·	1.5 km	MPC · JPL
94720	2001 XG_{62}	—	December 10, 2001	Socorro	LINEAR	MAS	1.8 km	MPC · JPL
94721	2001 XR_{62}	—	December 10, 2001	Socorro	LINEAR	NYS	2.0 km	MPC · JPL
94722	2001 XG_{63}	—	December 10, 2001	Socorro	LINEAR	·	3.0 km	MPC · JPL
94723	2001 XJ_{63}	—	December 10, 2001	Socorro	LINEAR	·	1.7 km	MPC · JPL
94724	2001 XY_{63}	—	December 10, 2001	Socorro	LINEAR	·	2.8 km	MPC · JPL
94725	2001 XB_{64}	—	December 10, 2001	Socorro	LINEAR	NYS	5.1 km	MPC · JPL
94726	2001 XD_{64}	—	December 10, 2001	Socorro	LINEAR	·	3.3 km	MPC · JPL
94727	2001 XA_{65}	—	December 10, 2001	Socorro	LINEAR	·	2.2 km	MPC · JPL
94728	2001 XL_{65}	—	December 10, 2001	Socorro	LINEAR	EUN	2.8 km	MPC · JPL
94729	2001 XQ_{65}	—	December 10, 2001	Socorro	LINEAR	·	3.0 km	MPC · JPL
94730	2001 XJ_{66}	—	December 10, 2001	Socorro	LINEAR	·	2.6 km	MPC · JPL
94731	2001 XA_{67}	—	December 10, 2001	Socorro	LINEAR	·	1.7 km	MPC · JPL
94732	2001 XW_{67}	—	December 10, 2001	Socorro	LINEAR	MAS	1.6 km	MPC · JPL
94733	2001 XG_{70}	—	December 11, 2001	Socorro	LINEAR	·	1.4 km	MPC · JPL
94734	2001 XM_{70}	—	December 11, 2001	Socorro	LINEAR	fast	2.9 km	MPC · JPL
94735	2001 XX_{70}	—	December 11, 2001	Socorro	LINEAR	·	2.4 km	MPC · JPL
94736	2001 XV_{73}	—	December 11, 2001	Socorro	LINEAR	·	1.4 km	MPC · JPL
94737	2001 XH_{74}	—	December 11, 2001	Socorro	LINEAR	·	1.9 km	MPC · JPL
94738	2001 XF_{75}	—	December 11, 2001	Socorro	LINEAR	NYS	1.7 km	MPC · JPL
94739	2001 XH_{77}	—	December 11, 2001	Socorro	LINEAR	NYS	1.7 km	MPC · JPL
94740	2001 XT_{77}	—	December 11, 2001	Socorro	LINEAR	NYS	1.9 km	MPC · JPL
94741	2001 XB_{78}	—	December 11, 2001	Socorro	LINEAR	·	1.6 km	MPC · JPL
94742	2001 XC_{78}	—	December 11, 2001	Socorro	LINEAR	PHO	2.2 km	MPC · JPL
94743	2001 XD_{78}	—	December 11, 2001	Socorro	LINEAR	·	2.2 km	MPC · JPL
94744	2001 XH_{81}	—	December 11, 2001	Socorro	LINEAR	·	2.1 km	MPC · JPL
94745	2001 XM_{81}	—	December 11, 2001	Socorro	LINEAR	·	2.6 km	MPC · JPL
94746	2001 XW_{84}	—	December 11, 2001	Socorro	LINEAR	V	1.1 km	MPC · JPL
94747	2001 XB_{85}	—	December 11, 2001	Socorro	LINEAR	·	5.7 km	MPC · JPL
94748	2001 XD_{85}	—	December 11, 2001	Socorro	LINEAR	·	2.9 km	MPC · JPL
94749	2001 XM_{85}	—	December 11, 2001	Socorro	LINEAR	·	2.1 km	MPC · JPL
94750	2001 XT_{85}	—	December 11, 2001	Socorro	LINEAR	·	1.7 km	MPC · JPL
94751	2001 XE_{86}	—	December 11, 2001	Socorro	LINEAR	·	1.6 km	MPC · JPL
94752	2001 XX_{86}	—	December 11, 2001	Socorro	LINEAR	·	6.3 km	MPC · JPL
94753	2001 XE_{88}	—	December 14, 2001	Desert Eagle	W. K. Y. Yeung	·	1.8 km	MPC · JPL
94754	2001 XY_{88}	—	December 10, 2001	Socorro	LINEAR	·	1.6 km	MPC · JPL
94755	2001 XJ_{89}	—	December 10, 2001	Socorro	LINEAR	·	2.3 km	MPC · JPL
94756	2001 XQ_{89}	—	December 10, 2001	Socorro	LINEAR	·	1.6 km	MPC · JPL
94757	2001 XT_{97}	—	December 10, 2001	Socorro	LINEAR	NYS	2.2 km	MPC · JPL
94758	2001 XW_{97}	—	December 10, 2001	Socorro	LINEAR	·	1.7 km	MPC · JPL
94759	2001 XR_{98}	—	December 10, 2001	Socorro	LINEAR	·	2.3 km	MPC · JPL
94760	2001 XU_{98}	—	December 10, 2001	Socorro	LINEAR	·	2.1 km	MPC · JPL
94761	2001 XX_{98}	—	December 10, 2001	Socorro	LINEAR	·	1.7 km	MPC · JPL
94762	2001 XC_{99}	—	December 10, 2001	Socorro	LINEAR	·	2.1 km	MPC · JPL
94763	2001 XM_{99}	—	December 10, 2001	Socorro	LINEAR	(5)	2.2 km	MPC · JPL
94764	2001 XQ_{99}	—	December 10, 2001	Socorro	LINEAR	·	4.0 km	MPC · JPL
94765	2001 XQ_{100}	—	December 10, 2001	Socorro	LINEAR	·	2.2 km	MPC · JPL
94766	2001 XU_{100}	—	December 10, 2001	Socorro	LINEAR	·	3.1 km	MPC · JPL
94767	2001 XC_{101}	—	December 10, 2001	Socorro	LINEAR	·	2.1 km	MPC · JPL
94768	2001 XF_{101}	—	December 10, 2001	Socorro	LINEAR	NYS	2.6 km	MPC · JPL
94769	2001 XR_{101}	—	December 10, 2001	Socorro	LINEAR	·	2.2 km	MPC · JPL
94770	2001 XA_{102}	—	December 10, 2001	Socorro	LINEAR	·	1.6 km	MPC · JPL
94771	2001 XF_{105}	—	December 14, 2001	Kingsnake	J. V. McClusky	·	2.6 km	MPC · JPL
94772	2001 XE_{107}	—	December 10, 2001	Socorro	LINEAR	·	4.1 km	MPC · JPL
94773	2001 XF_{108}	—	December 10, 2001	Socorro	LINEAR	·	4.2 km	MPC · JPL
94774	2001 XT_{108}	—	December 10, 2001	Socorro	LINEAR	·	2.4 km	MPC · JPL
94775	2001 XW_{111}	—	December 11, 2001	Socorro	LINEAR	·	1.4 km	MPC · JPL
94776	2001 XR_{112}	—	December 11, 2001	Socorro	LINEAR	·	2.8 km	MPC · JPL
94777	2001 XF_{114}	—	December 13, 2001	Socorro	LINEAR	slow	2.9 km	MPC · JPL
94778	2001 XQ_{115}	—	December 13, 2001	Socorro	LINEAR	·	3.1 km	MPC · JPL
94779	2001 XC_{116}	—	December 13, 2001	Socorro	LINEAR	·	2.0 km	MPC · JPL
94780	2001 XJ_{116}	—	December 13, 2001	Socorro	LINEAR	·	2.0 km	MPC · JPL
94781	2001 XO_{117}	—	December 13, 2001	Socorro	LINEAR	·	1.7 km	MPC · JPL
94782	2001 XS_{117}	—	December 13, 2001	Socorro	LINEAR	·	2.1 km	MPC · JPL
94783	2001 XK_{118}	—	December 13, 2001	Socorro	LINEAR	·	2.7 km	MPC · JPL
94784	2001 XP_{118}	—	December 13, 2001	Socorro	LINEAR	·	2.3 km	MPC · JPL
94785	2001 XL_{119}	—	December 13, 2001	Socorro	LINEAR	·	3.7 km	MPC · JPL
94786	2001 XM_{119}	—	December 13, 2001	Socorro	LINEAR	·	2.6 km	MPC · JPL
94787	2001 XP_{123}	—	December 14, 2001	Socorro	LINEAR	NYS ·	3.2 km	MPC · JPL
94788	2001 XW_{126}	—	December 14, 2001	Socorro	LINEAR	·	940 m	MPC · JPL
94789	2001 XF_{130}	—	December 14, 2001	Socorro	LINEAR	·	880 m	MPC · JPL
94790	2001 XZ_{135}	—	December 14, 2001	Socorro	LINEAR	KON · slow	3.8 km	MPC · JPL
94791	2001 XL_{140}	—	December 14, 2001	Socorro	LINEAR	·	1.1 km	MPC · JPL
94792	2001 XG_{143}	—	December 14, 2001	Socorro	LINEAR	·	1.5 km	MPC · JPL
94793	2001 XC_{149}	—	December 14, 2001	Socorro	LINEAR	MIS	4.7 km	MPC · JPL
94794	2001 XH_{149}	—	December 14, 2001	Socorro	LINEAR	V	1.3 km	MPC · JPL
94795	2001 XD_{154}	—	December 14, 2001	Socorro	LINEAR	·	2.7 km	MPC · JPL
94796	2001 XU_{154}	—	December 14, 2001	Socorro	LINEAR	·	2.4 km	MPC · JPL
94797	2001 XH_{155}	—	December 14, 2001	Socorro	LINEAR	·	1.8 km	MPC · JPL
94798	2001 XL_{155}	—	December 14, 2001	Socorro	LINEAR	·	2.2 km	MPC · JPL
94799	2001 XO_{155}	—	December 14, 2001	Socorro	LINEAR	·	1.9 km	MPC · JPL
94800	2001 XR_{155}	—	December 14, 2001	Socorro	LINEAR	·	2.0 km	MPC · JPL

== 94801–94900 ==
back to top

Designation			Discovery			Properties		Ref
Permanent	Provisional	Named after	Date	Site	Discoverer(s)	Category	Diam.	Ref
94801	2001 XY_{156}	—	December 14, 2001	Socorro	LINEAR	·	1.4 km	MPC · JPL
94802	2001 XA_{158}	—	December 14, 2001	Socorro	LINEAR	V	1.6 km	MPC · JPL
94803	2001 XB_{158}	—	December 14, 2001	Socorro	LINEAR	·	3.0 km	MPC · JPL
94804	2001 XG_{159}	—	December 14, 2001	Socorro	LINEAR	·	1.9 km	MPC · JPL
94805	2001 XD_{160}	—	December 14, 2001	Socorro	LINEAR	PHO	2.4 km	MPC · JPL
94806	2001 XS_{163}	—	December 14, 2001	Socorro	LINEAR	·	1.7 km	MPC · JPL
94807	2001 XP_{166}	—	December 14, 2001	Socorro	LINEAR	·	1.7 km	MPC · JPL
94808	2001 XM_{167}	—	December 14, 2001	Socorro	LINEAR	·	1.4 km	MPC · JPL
94809	2001 XV_{167}	—	December 14, 2001	Socorro	LINEAR	·	1.7 km	MPC · JPL
94810	2001 XU_{169}	—	December 14, 2001	Socorro	LINEAR	·	3.5 km	MPC · JPL
94811	2001 XQ_{172}	—	December 14, 2001	Socorro	LINEAR	·	2.3 km	MPC · JPL
94812	2001 XC_{173}	—	December 14, 2001	Socorro	LINEAR	V	1.4 km	MPC · JPL
94813	2001 XC_{174}	—	December 14, 2001	Socorro	LINEAR	·	1.9 km	MPC · JPL
94814	2001 XR_{174}	—	December 14, 2001	Socorro	LINEAR	MAS	1.2 km	MPC · JPL
94815	2001 XJ_{175}	—	December 14, 2001	Socorro	LINEAR	·	980 m	MPC · JPL
94816	2001 XD_{176}	—	December 14, 2001	Socorro	LINEAR	·	1.8 km	MPC · JPL
94817	2001 XO_{176}	—	December 14, 2001	Socorro	LINEAR	NYS	2.3 km	MPC · JPL
94818	2001 XS_{176}	—	December 14, 2001	Socorro	LINEAR	(5)	1.9 km	MPC · JPL
94819	2001 XF_{177}	—	December 14, 2001	Socorro	LINEAR	·	3.4 km	MPC · JPL
94820	2001 XL_{179}	—	December 14, 2001	Socorro	LINEAR	·	3.9 km	MPC · JPL
94821	2001 XM_{179}	—	December 14, 2001	Socorro	LINEAR	·	2.4 km	MPC · JPL
94822	2001 XC_{180}	—	December 14, 2001	Socorro	LINEAR	·	1.6 km	MPC · JPL
94823	2001 XU_{181}	—	December 14, 2001	Socorro	LINEAR	NYS	1.9 km	MPC · JPL
94824	2001 XY_{183}	—	December 14, 2001	Socorro	LINEAR	·	1.6 km	MPC · JPL
94825	2001 XF_{185}	—	December 14, 2001	Socorro	LINEAR	·	2.3 km	MPC · JPL
94826	2001 XJ_{186}	—	December 14, 2001	Socorro	LINEAR	·	2.2 km	MPC · JPL
94827	2001 XA_{190}	—	December 14, 2001	Socorro	LINEAR	·	1.9 km	MPC · JPL
94828	2001 XG_{190}	—	December 14, 2001	Socorro	LINEAR	·	1.3 km	MPC · JPL
94829	2001 XO_{190}	—	December 14, 2001	Socorro	LINEAR	·	1.5 km	MPC · JPL
94830	2001 XF_{191}	—	December 14, 2001	Socorro	LINEAR	·	1.2 km	MPC · JPL
94831	2001 XO_{191}	—	December 14, 2001	Socorro	LINEAR	·	2.5 km	MPC · JPL
94832	2001 XG_{192}	—	December 14, 2001	Socorro	LINEAR	·	2.0 km	MPC · JPL
94833	2001 XQ_{192}	—	December 14, 2001	Socorro	LINEAR	·	2.9 km	MPC · JPL
94834	2001 XY_{193}	—	December 14, 2001	Socorro	LINEAR	·	2.6 km	MPC · JPL
94835	2001 XG_{194}	—	December 14, 2001	Socorro	LINEAR	·	1.2 km	MPC · JPL
94836	2001 XH_{194}	—	December 14, 2001	Socorro	LINEAR	NYS	1.7 km	MPC · JPL
94837	2001 XN_{194}	—	December 14, 2001	Socorro	LINEAR	·	2.8 km	MPC · JPL
94838	2001 XU_{194}	—	December 14, 2001	Socorro	LINEAR	·	3.3 km	MPC · JPL
94839	2001 XD_{198}	—	December 14, 2001	Socorro	LINEAR	V	1.4 km	MPC · JPL
94840	2001 XN_{198}	—	December 14, 2001	Socorro	LINEAR	·	2.9 km	MPC · JPL
94841	2001 XC_{199}	—	December 14, 2001	Socorro	LINEAR	NYS	1.8 km	MPC · JPL
94842	2001 XG_{202}	—	December 11, 2001	Socorro	LINEAR	·	2.3 km	MPC · JPL
94843	2001 XB_{204}	—	December 11, 2001	Socorro	LINEAR	·	2.8 km	MPC · JPL
94844	2001 XE_{204}	—	December 11, 2001	Socorro	LINEAR	·	1.5 km	MPC · JPL
94845	2001 XL_{204}	—	December 11, 2001	Socorro	LINEAR	·	3.9 km	MPC · JPL
94846	2001 XN_{205}	—	December 11, 2001	Socorro	LINEAR	·	2.2 km	MPC · JPL
94847	2001 XD_{207}	—	December 11, 2001	Socorro	LINEAR	·	2.3 km	MPC · JPL
94848	2001 XO_{207}	—	December 11, 2001	Socorro	LINEAR	·	2.3 km	MPC · JPL
94849	2001 XK_{208}	—	December 11, 2001	Socorro	LINEAR	·	2.4 km	MPC · JPL
94850	2001 XY_{208}	—	December 11, 2001	Socorro	LINEAR	V	1.2 km	MPC · JPL
94851	2001 XE_{209}	—	December 11, 2001	Socorro	LINEAR	·	1.5 km	MPC · JPL
94852	2001 XJ_{209}	—	December 11, 2001	Socorro	LINEAR	·	2.5 km	MPC · JPL
94853	2001 XE_{210}	—	December 11, 2001	Socorro	LINEAR	·	2.2 km	MPC · JPL
94854	2001 XP_{210}	—	December 11, 2001	Socorro	LINEAR	·	2.1 km	MPC · JPL
94855	2001 XR_{210}	—	December 11, 2001	Socorro	LINEAR	·	2.8 km	MPC · JPL
94856	2001 XA_{211}	—	December 11, 2001	Socorro	LINEAR	·	2.0 km	MPC · JPL
94857	2001 XH_{211}	—	December 11, 2001	Socorro	LINEAR	·	1.3 km	MPC · JPL
94858	2001 XC_{213}	—	December 11, 2001	Socorro	LINEAR	RAF	1.8 km	MPC · JPL
94859	2001 XO_{213}	—	December 11, 2001	Socorro	LINEAR	·	2.5 km	MPC · JPL
94860	2001 XE_{214}	—	December 11, 2001	Socorro	LINEAR	·	1 km	MPC · JPL
94861	2001 XJ_{214}	—	December 11, 2001	Socorro	LINEAR	·	1.6 km	MPC · JPL
94862	2001 XT_{214}	—	December 13, 2001	Socorro	LINEAR	·	2.5 km	MPC · JPL
94863	2001 XJ_{216}	—	December 14, 2001	Socorro	LINEAR	NYS	2.1 km	MPC · JPL
94864	2001 XW_{216}	—	December 14, 2001	Socorro	LINEAR	·	5.0 km	MPC · JPL
94865	2001 XR_{217}	—	December 14, 2001	Socorro	LINEAR	(5)	2.4 km	MPC · JPL
94866	2001 XW_{217}	—	December 14, 2001	Socorro	LINEAR	·	1.7 km	MPC · JPL
94867	2001 XS_{218}	—	December 15, 2001	Socorro	LINEAR	NYS ·	4.2 km	MPC · JPL
94868	2001 XS_{222}	—	December 15, 2001	Socorro	LINEAR	·	2.0 km	MPC · JPL
94869	2001 XR_{224}	—	December 15, 2001	Socorro	LINEAR	·	1.9 km	MPC · JPL
94870	2001 XN_{225}	—	December 15, 2001	Socorro	LINEAR	V	1.1 km	MPC · JPL
94871	2001 XA_{226}	—	December 15, 2001	Socorro	LINEAR	·	4.2 km	MPC · JPL
94872	2001 XT_{226}	—	December 15, 2001	Socorro	LINEAR	EUN	2.3 km	MPC · JPL
94873	2001 XZ_{232}	—	December 15, 2001	Socorro	LINEAR	·	1.8 km	MPC · JPL
94874	2001 XH_{233}	—	December 15, 2001	Socorro	LINEAR	·	2.2 km	MPC · JPL
94875	2001 XL_{233}	—	December 15, 2001	Socorro	LINEAR	·	3.2 km	MPC · JPL
94876	2001 XW_{233}	—	December 15, 2001	Socorro	LINEAR	·	2.5 km	MPC · JPL
94877	2001 XO_{234}	—	December 15, 2001	Socorro	LINEAR	·	1.6 km	MPC · JPL
94878	2001 XU_{238}	—	December 15, 2001	Socorro	LINEAR	·	1.3 km	MPC · JPL
94879	2001 XR_{239}	—	December 15, 2001	Socorro	LINEAR	V	1.1 km	MPC · JPL
94880	2001 XW_{241}	—	December 14, 2001	Socorro	LINEAR	NYS	1.3 km	MPC · JPL
94881	2001 XS_{243}	—	December 14, 2001	Socorro	LINEAR	·	5.0 km	MPC · JPL
94882	2001 XC_{244}	—	December 15, 2001	Socorro	LINEAR	·	4.2 km	MPC · JPL
94883	2001 XS_{248}	—	December 14, 2001	Kitt Peak	Spacewatch	·	2.7 km	MPC · JPL
94884 Takuya	2001 XK_{249}	Takuya	December 14, 2001	Uccle	H. M. J. Boffin	·	1.9 km	MPC · JPL
94885	2001 XK_{250}	—	December 14, 2001	Socorro	LINEAR	·	2.7 km	MPC · JPL
94886	2001 XY_{252}	—	December 14, 2001	Socorro	LINEAR	EUN	2.4 km	MPC · JPL
94887	2001 XA_{254}	—	December 14, 2001	Socorro	LINEAR	·	3.0 km	MPC · JPL
94888	2001 XM_{254}	—	December 15, 2001	Socorro	LINEAR	·	2.3 km	MPC · JPL
94889	2001 YK	—	December 17, 2001	Socorro	LINEAR	·	1.6 km	MPC · JPL
94890	2001 YB_{3}	—	December 18, 2001	Socorro	LINEAR	·	1.7 km	MPC · JPL
94891	2001 YC_{5}	—	December 23, 2001	Socorro	LINEAR	·	4.9 km	MPC · JPL
94892	2001 YE_{5}	—	December 25, 2001	Ametlla de Mar	Ametlla de Mar	V	1.4 km	MPC · JPL
94893	2001 YG_{5}	—	December 25, 2001	Ametlla de Mar	J. Nomen	·	1.9 km	MPC · JPL
94894	2001 YC_{6}	—	December 17, 2001	Palomar	NEAT	MAS	1.4 km	MPC · JPL
94895	2001 YF_{7}	—	December 17, 2001	Socorro	LINEAR	V	1.5 km	MPC · JPL
94896	2001 YZ_{7}	—	December 17, 2001	Socorro	LINEAR	·	1.9 km	MPC · JPL
94897	2001 YD_{8}	—	December 17, 2001	Socorro	LINEAR	(2076)	1.6 km	MPC · JPL
94898	2001 YA_{11}	—	December 17, 2001	Socorro	LINEAR	NYS	1.4 km	MPC · JPL
94899	2001 YN_{11}	—	December 17, 2001	Socorro	LINEAR	·	1.2 km	MPC · JPL
94900	2001 YF_{14}	—	December 17, 2001	Socorro	LINEAR	·	1.6 km	MPC · JPL

== 94901–95000 ==
back to top

Designation			Discovery			Properties		Ref
Permanent	Provisional	Named after	Date	Site	Discoverer(s)	Category	Diam.	Ref
94901	2001 YR_{18}	—	December 17, 2001	Socorro	LINEAR	MAS	1.2 km	MPC · JPL
94902	2001 YX_{18}	—	December 17, 2001	Socorro	LINEAR	·	1.7 km	MPC · JPL
94903	2001 YP_{20}	—	December 18, 2001	Socorro	LINEAR	·	2.6 km	MPC · JPL
94904	2001 YM_{23}	—	December 18, 2001	Socorro	LINEAR	·	2.8 km	MPC · JPL
94905	2001 YS_{24}	—	December 18, 2001	Socorro	LINEAR	·	2.2 km	MPC · JPL
94906	2001 YF_{26}	—	December 18, 2001	Socorro	LINEAR	·	6.3 km	MPC · JPL
94907	2001 YC_{35}	—	December 18, 2001	Socorro	LINEAR	·	3.9 km	MPC · JPL
94908	2001 YG_{40}	—	December 18, 2001	Socorro	LINEAR	·	2.3 km	MPC · JPL
94909	2001 YT_{41}	—	December 18, 2001	Socorro	LINEAR	·	1.4 km	MPC · JPL
94910	2001 YC_{47}	—	December 18, 2001	Socorro	LINEAR	(5)	2.1 km	MPC · JPL
94911	2001 YQ_{47}	—	December 18, 2001	Socorro	LINEAR	·	1.2 km	MPC · JPL
94912	2001 YR_{47}	—	December 18, 2001	Socorro	LINEAR	MAS	1.6 km	MPC · JPL
94913	2001 YL_{48}	—	December 18, 2001	Socorro	LINEAR	NYS	1.9 km	MPC · JPL
94914	2001 YJ_{52}	—	December 18, 2001	Socorro	LINEAR	·	2.2 km	MPC · JPL
94915	2001 YL_{57}	—	December 18, 2001	Socorro	LINEAR	·	1.5 km	MPC · JPL
94916	2001 YQ_{57}	—	December 18, 2001	Socorro	LINEAR	MAS	1.9 km	MPC · JPL
94917	2001 YF_{58}	—	December 18, 2001	Socorro	LINEAR	·	1.7 km	MPC · JPL
94918	2001 YH_{60}	—	December 18, 2001	Socorro	LINEAR	(2076)	1.2 km	MPC · JPL
94919	2001 YO_{60}	—	December 18, 2001	Socorro	LINEAR	·	2.6 km	MPC · JPL
94920	2001 YN_{62}	—	December 18, 2001	Socorro	LINEAR	·	2.4 km	MPC · JPL
94921	2001 YT_{62}	—	December 18, 2001	Socorro	LINEAR	MRX	2.5 km	MPC · JPL
94922	2001 YM_{63}	—	December 18, 2001	Socorro	LINEAR	·	4.1 km	MPC · JPL
94923	2001 YA_{64}	—	December 18, 2001	Socorro	LINEAR	·	1.4 km	MPC · JPL
94924	2001 YF_{64}	—	December 18, 2001	Socorro	LINEAR	·	4.3 km	MPC · JPL
94925	2001 YB_{65}	—	December 18, 2001	Socorro	LINEAR	·	2.3 km	MPC · JPL
94926	2001 YW_{66}	—	December 18, 2001	Socorro	LINEAR	·	2.3 km	MPC · JPL
94927	2001 YT_{67}	—	December 18, 2001	Socorro	LINEAR	·	2.4 km	MPC · JPL
94928	2001 YX_{70}	—	December 18, 2001	Socorro	LINEAR	MAS	1.4 km	MPC · JPL
94929	2001 YA_{71}	—	December 18, 2001	Socorro	LINEAR	·	1.6 km	MPC · JPL
94930	2001 YF_{71}	—	December 18, 2001	Socorro	LINEAR	·	2.1 km	MPC · JPL
94931	2001 YO_{72}	—	December 18, 2001	Socorro	LINEAR	NYS	1.8 km	MPC · JPL
94932	2001 YJ_{73}	—	December 18, 2001	Socorro	LINEAR	·	2.1 km	MPC · JPL
94933	2001 YT_{73}	—	December 18, 2001	Socorro	LINEAR	·	4.4 km	MPC · JPL
94934	2001 YV_{73}	—	December 18, 2001	Socorro	LINEAR	·	4.3 km	MPC · JPL
94935	2001 YY_{73}	—	December 18, 2001	Socorro	LINEAR	·	4.0 km	MPC · JPL
94936	2001 YQ_{74}	—	December 18, 2001	Socorro	LINEAR	V	1.3 km	MPC · JPL
94937	2001 YX_{77}	—	December 18, 2001	Socorro	LINEAR	·	1.6 km	MPC · JPL
94938	2001 YE_{78}	—	December 18, 2001	Socorro	LINEAR	·	2.5 km	MPC · JPL
94939	2001 YJ_{78}	—	December 18, 2001	Socorro	LINEAR	NYS	2.5 km	MPC · JPL
94940	2001 YP_{78}	—	December 18, 2001	Socorro	LINEAR	·	1.8 km	MPC · JPL
94941	2001 YU_{78}	—	December 18, 2001	Socorro	LINEAR	·	1.8 km	MPC · JPL
94942	2001 YF_{79}	—	December 18, 2001	Socorro	LINEAR	V	1.4 km	MPC · JPL
94943	2001 YP_{81}	—	December 18, 2001	Socorro	LINEAR	·	2.6 km	MPC · JPL
94944	2001 YH_{82}	—	December 18, 2001	Socorro	LINEAR	·	1.7 km	MPC · JPL
94945	2001 YD_{83}	—	December 18, 2001	Socorro	LINEAR	NYS	2.1 km	MPC · JPL
94946	2001 YY_{83}	—	December 18, 2001	Socorro	LINEAR	·	1.5 km	MPC · JPL
94947	2001 YH_{85}	—	December 18, 2001	Socorro	LINEAR	·	2.5 km	MPC · JPL
94948	2001 YJ_{85}	—	December 18, 2001	Socorro	LINEAR	·	2.0 km	MPC · JPL
94949	2001 YU_{85}	—	December 18, 2001	Socorro	LINEAR	·	1.3 km	MPC · JPL
94950	2001 YJ_{86}	—	December 18, 2001	Socorro	LINEAR	·	1.4 km	MPC · JPL
94951	2001 YW_{86}	—	December 18, 2001	Socorro	LINEAR	·	2.0 km	MPC · JPL
94952	2001 YY_{86}	—	December 18, 2001	Socorro	LINEAR	V	1.3 km	MPC · JPL
94953	2001 YQ_{88}	—	December 18, 2001	Socorro	LINEAR	V	1.3 km	MPC · JPL
94954	2001 YJ_{90}	—	December 18, 2001	Socorro	LINEAR	PHO	2.4 km	MPC · JPL
94955	2001 YS_{90}	—	December 21, 2001	Cima Ekar	ADAS	PHO	2.5 km	MPC · JPL
94956	2001 YD_{92}	—	December 18, 2001	Palomar	NEAT	·	2.4 km	MPC · JPL
94957	2001 YM_{95}	—	December 18, 2001	Palomar	NEAT	V	1.2 km	MPC · JPL
94958	2001 YP_{95}	—	December 18, 2001	Palomar	NEAT	·	2.2 km	MPC · JPL
94959	2001 YH_{97}	—	December 17, 2001	Socorro	LINEAR	MAS	1.7 km	MPC · JPL
94960	2001 YU_{97}	—	December 17, 2001	Socorro	LINEAR	NYS	2.5 km	MPC · JPL
94961	2001 YJ_{101}	—	December 17, 2001	Socorro	LINEAR	·	2.2 km	MPC · JPL
94962	2001 YJ_{104}	—	December 17, 2001	Socorro	LINEAR	·	2.6 km	MPC · JPL
94963	2001 YP_{104}	—	December 17, 2001	Socorro	LINEAR	·	2.6 km	MPC · JPL
94964	2001 YU_{104}	—	December 17, 2001	Socorro	LINEAR	·	1.3 km	MPC · JPL
94965	2001 YG_{105}	—	December 17, 2001	Socorro	LINEAR	·	2.1 km	MPC · JPL
94966	2001 YR_{105}	—	December 17, 2001	Socorro	LINEAR	HOF	4.7 km	MPC · JPL
94967	2001 YH_{106}	—	December 17, 2001	Socorro	LINEAR	·	3.9 km	MPC · JPL
94968	2001 YX_{106}	—	December 17, 2001	Socorro	LINEAR	·	1.8 km	MPC · JPL
94969	2001 YR_{107}	—	December 17, 2001	Socorro	LINEAR	·	2.2 km	MPC · JPL
94970	2001 YY_{107}	—	December 17, 2001	Socorro	LINEAR	·	2.6 km	MPC · JPL
94971	2001 YW_{109}	—	December 18, 2001	Socorro	LINEAR	·	2.5 km	MPC · JPL
94972	2001 YY_{109}	—	December 18, 2001	Socorro	LINEAR	·	2.3 km	MPC · JPL
94973	2001 YQ_{111}	—	December 18, 2001	Anderson Mesa	LONEOS	·	2.1 km	MPC · JPL
94974	2001 YO_{112}	—	December 18, 2001	Anderson Mesa	LONEOS	V	1.4 km	MPC · JPL
94975	2001 YP_{112}	—	December 18, 2001	Anderson Mesa	LONEOS	·	2.0 km	MPC · JPL
94976	2001 YF_{113}	—	December 19, 2001	Socorro	LINEAR	·	2.4 km	MPC · JPL
94977	2001 YU_{113}	—	December 19, 2001	Socorro	LINEAR	NYS	1.8 km	MPC · JPL
94978	2001 YH_{114}	—	December 18, 2001	Palomar	NEAT	·	2.5 km	MPC · JPL
94979	2001 YZ_{114}	—	December 17, 2001	Socorro	LINEAR	·	1.7 km	MPC · JPL
94980	2001 YN_{115}	—	December 17, 2001	Socorro	LINEAR	·	4.7 km	MPC · JPL
94981	2001 YV_{115}	—	December 17, 2001	Socorro	LINEAR	·	3.0 km	MPC · JPL
94982	2001 YA_{116}	—	December 17, 2001	Socorro	LINEAR	MAR	2.6 km	MPC · JPL
94983	2001 YR_{116}	—	December 18, 2001	Socorro	LINEAR	·	1.8 km	MPC · JPL
94984	2001 YT_{116}	—	December 18, 2001	Socorro	LINEAR	·	2.4 km	MPC · JPL
94985	2001 YF_{117}	—	December 18, 2001	Socorro	LINEAR	NYS	2.1 km	MPC · JPL
94986	2001 YE_{118}	—	December 18, 2001	Socorro	LINEAR	NYS	2.7 km	MPC · JPL
94987	2001 YK_{118}	—	December 18, 2001	Socorro	LINEAR	·	2.6 km	MPC · JPL
94988	2001 YU_{119}	—	December 19, 2001	Socorro	LINEAR	·	1.9 km	MPC · JPL
94989	2001 YJ_{120}	—	December 20, 2001	Socorro	LINEAR	·	1.4 km	MPC · JPL
94990	2001 YQ_{120}	—	December 20, 2001	Socorro	LINEAR	NYS	2.4 km	MPC · JPL
94991	2001 YC_{122}	—	December 17, 2001	Socorro	LINEAR	·	4.3 km	MPC · JPL
94992	2001 YE_{128}	—	December 17, 2001	Socorro	LINEAR	·	2.1 km	MPC · JPL
94993	2001 YL_{128}	—	December 17, 2001	Socorro	LINEAR	·	2.7 km	MPC · JPL
94994	2001 YM_{128}	—	December 17, 2001	Socorro	LINEAR	V	1.2 km	MPC · JPL
94995	2001 YX_{132}	—	December 20, 2001	Socorro	LINEAR	·	3.6 km	MPC · JPL
94996	2001 YP_{133}	—	December 18, 2001	Kitt Peak	Spacewatch	·	2.1 km	MPC · JPL
94997	2001 YH_{137}	—	December 22, 2001	Socorro	LINEAR	V	1.3 km	MPC · JPL
94998	2001 YL_{138}	—	December 21, 2001	Haleakala	NEAT	·	4.6 km	MPC · JPL
94999	2001 YS_{138}	—	December 18, 2001	Kitt Peak	Spacewatch	·	2.5 km	MPC · JPL
95000	2001 YO_{139}	—	December 24, 2001	Haleakala	NEAT	slow	2.4 km	MPC · JPL

back to top

== See also ==
- Meanings of minor-planet names: 94001–95000
