= Jaume Nomen =

Spanish oral and maxillofacial surgeon and amateur astronomer

Minor planets discovered: 55
19539 Anaverdu	May 14, 1999
19776 Balears	August 4, 2000
19783 Antoniromanya	August 27, 2000
(20621) 1999 TK_{11}	October 9, 1999
23318 Salvadorsanchez	January 20, 2001
24048 Pedroduque	October 10, 1999
(25470) 1999 XW_{35}	December 6, 1999
25472 Joanoro	December 6, 1999
(32530) 2001 PW_{12}	August 12, 1999
(32541) 2001 QF_{2}	August 17, 2001
(32625) 2001 RZ_{45}	September 15, 2001
(34873) 2001 UF_{65}	October 20, 2001
37391 Ebre	December 1, 2001
38671 Verdaguer	August 7, 2000
(38961) 2000 TG_{1}	October 1, 2000
(51872) 2001 PN_{9}	August 10, 2001
(52034) 2002 PX_{42}	August 9, 2002
(54676) 2000 YP_{12}	December 25, 2000
(55211) 2001 RL_{43}	September 13, 2001
(55597) 2002 RO_{66}	September 7, 2002
(55614) 2002 TJ_{59}	October 4, 2002
(57367) 2001 RM_{43}	September 13, 2001
(58044) 2002 WF	November 17, 2002
(61351) 2000 PS_{9}	August 9, 2000
(62131) 2000 SH_{4}	September 21, 2000
(62132) 2000 SJ_{4}	September 21, 2000
(63814) 2001 RY_{45}	September 15, 2001
(64284) 2001 UE_{6}	October 20, 2001
(64587) 2001 XA	December 1, 2001
(67539) 2000 SK_{4}	September 22, 2000
(72068) 2000 YC_{29}	December 31, 2000
(72069) 2000 YD_{29}	December 31, 2000
(74591) 1999 PS_{1}	August 10, 1999
(74624) 1999 RS_{32}	September 10, 1999
(77921) 2002 EA_{12}	March 15, 2002
(88368) 2001 PO_{9}	August 11, 2001
(88370) 2001 PQ_{14}	August 15, 2001
(88467) 2001 QM_{108}	August 25, 2001
(89835) 2002 CM_{12}	February 7, 2002
(91424) 1999 PT_{1}	August 10, 1999
(94411) 2001 TA_{17}	October 13, 2001
(94893) 2001 YG_{5}	December 25, 2001
(95031) 2002 AV_{26}	January 13, 2002
(95218) 2002 CO_{14}	February 8, 2002
(99596) 2002 GG_{24}	April 14, 2002
(106847) 2000 YO_{16}	December 28, 2000
(112549) 2002 PZ_{42}	August 11, 2002
(124311) 2001 QO_{73}	August 21, 2001
(125459) 2001 WQ_{5}	November 20, 2001
(146372) 2001 QE_{2}	August 16, 2001
(159610) 2002 AJ_{13}	January 12, 2002
(182108) 2000 PY_{6}	August 6, 2000
(286621) 2002 EX_{1}	March 8, 2002
(373571) 2001 YF_{5}	December 25, 2001
(380397) 2002 XE_{89}	December 15, 2002

Jaume Nomen Torres (also: Jaime Nomen; born June 23, 1960, in Tortosa, Catalonia) is a Spanish oral and maxillofacial surgeon, amateur astronomer, and discoverer of numerous minor planets. He is of Catalan origin and became publicly known for the discovery of the near-Earth asteroid 2012 DA14 (later named 367943 Duende) by the OAM team (of which he is a member) during the La Sagra Sky Survey. The asteroid 56561 Jaimenomen is named after him.

Nomen is a prolific discoverer of asteroids, a professor at the University of Barcelona, and an active member of GEA (Grup d'Estudis Astronòmics, Barcelona). He has discovered more than sixty asteroids, of which 55 have been numbered. He is the director of the Unicorn Project 3SSS, that places three automatic telescopes of 61 cm in the Piera Observatory, l'Ametlla de Mar Observatory, and Costitx Observatory to increase the capacity of detection and study of asteroids.
