= Meanings of minor-planet names: 94001–95000 =

As minor planet discoveries are confirmed, they are given a permanent number by the IAU's Minor Planet Center (MPC), and the discoverers can then submit names for them, following the IAU's naming conventions. The list below concerns those minor planets in the specified number-range that have received names, and explains the meanings of those names.

Official naming citations of newly named small Solar System bodies are approved and published in a bulletin by IAU's Working Group for Small Bodies Nomenclature (WGSBN). Before May 2021, citations were published in MPC's Minor Planet Circulars for many decades. Recent citations can also be found on the JPL Small-Body Database (SBDB). Until his death in 2016, German astronomer Lutz D. Schmadel compiled these citations into the Dictionary of Minor Planet Names (DMP) and regularly updated the collection.

Based on Paul Herget's The Names of the Minor Planets, Schmadel also researched the unclear origin of numerous asteroids, most of which had been named prior to World War II. This article incorporates text from this source, which is in the public domain: SBDB New namings may only be added to this list below after official publication as the preannouncement of names is condemned. The WGSBN publishes a comprehensive guideline for the naming rules of non-cometary small Solar System bodies.

== 94001–94100 ==
Named minor planet	Provisional	This minor planet was named for...	Ref · Catalog
There are no named minor planets in this number range

== 94101–94200 ==
back to top

Named minor planet	Provisional	This minor planet was named for...	Ref · Catalog
There are no named minor planets in this number range

== 94201–94300 ==
back to top

Named minor planet	Provisional	This minor planet was named for...	Ref · Catalog
94228 Leesuikwan	2001 BU_{61}	Lee Sui Kwan (born 1968), Chinese former vice president of the Hong Kong Astronomical Society, has been putting sustained efforts into astronomical popularization and education to the general public in Hong Kong. He has given several hundred astronomical talks to teenagers to stimulate their interest in astronomy.	JPL · 94228
94243 Miquelroser	2001 CB_{10}	Miquel Guarro i Poch (1910–1991) and Roser Flo i Esteve (1913–1999), the parents of the discoverer.	IAU · 94243
94291 Django	2001 DX_{86}	Django Reinhardt (1910–1953), a legendary Belgian Sinto Gypsy jazz guitarist composer, became renowned as a member of the famous ensemble "Quintette du Hot Club de France" in 1934. Despite limited use of his injured fretting hand, Reinhardt pushed guitar technique to new virtuosic heights.	JPL · 94291

== 94301–94400 ==
back to top

Named minor planet	Provisional	This minor planet was named for...	Ref · Catalog
94356 Naruto	2001 QE_{178}	Naruto Strait (Naruto Kaikyō) is a strait between the Japanese islands of Shikoku and Awaji.	JPL · 94356
94400 Hongdaeyong	2001 SG_{267}	Hong Daeyong (1731–1783), a Korean astronomer of the late Chosun Dynasty, worked to overcome old, conventional cosmology in Korea and advocated new concepts introduced through China. He also invented numerous astronomical instruments.	JPL · 94400

== 94401–94500 ==
back to top

Named minor planet	Provisional	This minor planet was named for...	Ref · Catalog
There are no named minor planets in this number range

== 94501–94600 ==
back to top

Named minor planet	Provisional	This minor planet was named for...	Ref · Catalog
94556 Janstarý	2001 VG_{17}	Jan Starý (born 1950) has worked as an observer at Ondřejov Observatory of the Astronomical Institute of the Czech Academy of Sciences. He was involved in operations of fireball photographing cameras there for more than 10 years. Name suggested by P. Spurný.	JPL · 94556

== 94601–94700 ==
back to top

Named minor planet	Provisional	This minor planet was named for...	Ref · Catalog
There are no named minor planets in this number range

== 94701–94800 ==
back to top

Named minor planet	Provisional	This minor planet was named for...	Ref · Catalog
There are no named minor planets in this number range

== 94801–94900 ==
back to top

Named minor planet	Provisional	This minor planet was named for...	Ref · Catalog
94884 Takuya	2001 XK_{249}	Takuya Matsuda (born 1943), a Japanese astrophysicist and professor in the department of Earth and planetary sciences at Kobe University, is a recognised authority on computer simulations, particularly of accretion disks and wind accretion. Also a relativitist, he has served as president of the Astronomical Society of Japan.	JPL · 94884

== 94901–95000 ==
back to top

Named minor planet	Provisional	This minor planet was named for...	Ref · Catalog
There are no named minor planets in this number range

back to top

Preceded by 93,001–94,000	Meanings of minor-planet names List of minor planets: 94,001–95,000	Succeeded by 95,001–96,000
