= Piera Observatory =

- Observatory code: 165
- Location: Piera, Catalonia, Spain
- Coordinates: 41.5215°N 1.7553°E
- Website: www.astrogea.org/jguarro/

Piera Observatory (Catalan: Observatori Astronòmic de Piera) is an astronomical observatory located in Piera, Catalonia, with the IAU observatory code 165.

It takes part in the Unicorn Project with the Ametlla de Mar Observatory and Costitx Observatory. One of its first discoveries was the asteroid 1999 YZ_{8} (by Joan Guarro), now 13868 Catalonia. Josep Comas Solá's discovery, nearly 70 years earlier, of 1930 SB was initially supposed to be named Catalonia, but political pressure from the Francoist regime then in power made this impossible. Solá finally named it 1188 Gothlandia instead, from the ancient Frankish name for Catalonia, Gothland or Gotia.
