= Ametlla de Mar Observatory =

- Observatory code: 946
- Location: L'Ametlla de Mar, Spain
- Coordinates: 40°55′44″N 0°47′29″E
- Altitude: 110 m (360 ft)
- Established: 1999
- Website: astrogea.org/jnomen/
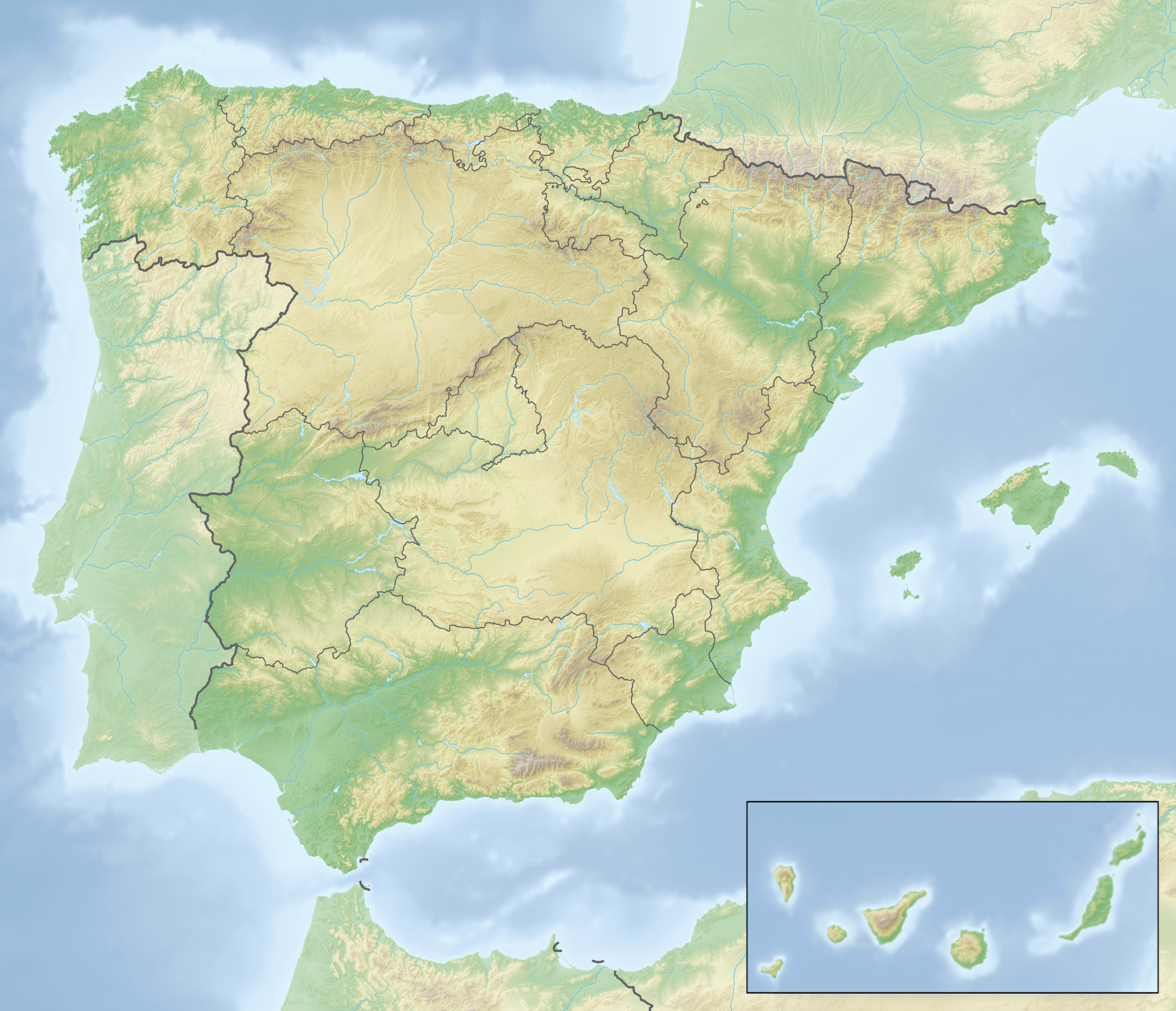
- Location of Ametlla de Mar Observatory

Ametlla de Mar Observatory is an astronomical observatory situated in L'Ametlla de Mar in the autonomous Catalonia region of Spain. It has received the IAU observatory code 946 and is operated by Catalan astronomer Jaume Nomen. The observatory participates in the "Unicorn Project" and in the Minor Planet Astrometry group (Grup d'Estudis Astronòmics, GEA).

The Minor Planet Center credits the Ametlla de Mar Observatory with the discovery of 12 numbered minor planets between 2001 and 2002. As of 2016, all numbered bodies remain unnamed and still display their provisional designation.

Minor planets discovered: 12
see § List of discovered minor planets

== List of discovered minor planets ==
(46248) 2001 HM_{22}	25 April 2001	list
(52067) 2002 QE_{36}	29 August 2002	list
(58051) 2002 YY_{2}	28 December 2002	list
(78426) 2002 QY_{44}	30 August 2002	list
(78559) 2002 RG_{154}	14 September 2002	list
(84557) 2002 VC	1 November 2002	list

(94892) 2001 YE_{5}	25 December 2001	list
(99205) 2001 HL_{22}	25 April 2001	list
(133034) 2002 YZ_{2}	28 December 2002	list
(142378) 2002 SJ_{1}	27 September 2002	list
(143217) 2002 YA_{3}	28 December 2002	list
(151519) 2002 QG_{36}	30 August 2002	list

== See also ==
- List of asteroid-discovering observatories
- List of minor planet discoverers § Discovering dedicated institutions
- List of observatory codes
