= List of minor planets: 74001–75000 =

The following is a partial list of minor planets, running from minor-planet number 74001 through 75000, inclusive. The primary data for this and other partial lists is based on JPL's "Small-Body Orbital Elements" and data available from the Minor Planet Center. Critical list information is also provided by the MPC, unless otherwise specified from Lowell Observatory. A detailed description of the table's columns and additional sources are given on the main page including a complete list of every page in this series, and a statistical break-up on the dynamical classification of minor planets.

Also see the summary list of all named bodies in numerical and alphabetical order, and the corresponding naming citations for the number range of this particular list. New namings may only be added to this list after official publication, as the preannouncement of names is condemned by the Working Group for Small Bodies Nomenclature of the International Astronomical Union.

Near-Earth obj.	MBA (inner)	MBA (outer)	Centaur
Mars-crosser	MBA (middle)	Jupiter trojan	Trans-Neptunian obj.
Unclassified

== 74001–74100 ==
Designation			Discovery			Properties		Ref
Permanent	Provisional	Named after	Date	Site	Discoverer(s)	Category	Diam.	Ref
74001	1998 FW_{45}	—	March 20, 1998	Socorro	LINEAR	·	2.4 km	MPC · JPL
74002	1998 FL_{47}	—	March 20, 1998	Socorro	LINEAR	·	2.5 km	MPC · JPL
74003	1998 FP_{48}	—	March 20, 1998	Socorro	LINEAR	·	2.8 km	MPC · JPL
74004	1998 FS_{64}	—	March 20, 1998	Socorro	LINEAR	·	1.5 km	MPC · JPL
74005	1998 FH_{70}	—	March 20, 1998	Socorro	LINEAR	NYS	2.5 km	MPC · JPL
74006	1998 FP_{71}	—	March 20, 1998	Socorro	LINEAR	·	6.5 km	MPC · JPL
74007	1998 FY_{78}	—	March 24, 1998	Socorro	LINEAR	·	2.3 km	MPC · JPL
74008	1998 FM_{103}	—	March 31, 1998	Socorro	LINEAR	·	2.5 km	MPC · JPL
74009	1998 FV_{103}	—	March 31, 1998	Socorro	LINEAR	V	1.6 km	MPC · JPL
74010	1998 FC_{104}	—	March 31, 1998	Socorro	LINEAR	V	2.0 km	MPC · JPL
74011	1998 FE_{106}	—	March 31, 1998	Socorro	LINEAR	V	1.2 km	MPC · JPL
74012	1998 FP_{108}	—	March 31, 1998	Socorro	LINEAR	·	3.6 km	MPC · JPL
74013	1998 FJ_{109}	—	March 31, 1998	Socorro	LINEAR	V	1.4 km	MPC · JPL
74014	1998 FK_{114}	—	March 31, 1998	Socorro	LINEAR	·	2.6 km	MPC · JPL
74015	1998 FP_{130}	—	March 22, 1998	Socorro	LINEAR	·	1.7 km	MPC · JPL
74016	1998 FK_{136}	—	March 28, 1998	Socorro	LINEAR	3:2	10 km	MPC · JPL
74017	1998 FN_{138}	—	March 28, 1998	Socorro	LINEAR	BAR	2.5 km	MPC · JPL
74018	1998 FF_{148}	—	March 29, 1998	Socorro	LINEAR	MAS	1.6 km	MPC · JPL
74019	1998 GY	—	April 2, 1998	Woomera	F. B. Zoltowski	·	1.5 km	MPC · JPL
74020	1998 GW_{10}	—	April 2, 1998	La Silla	E. W. Elst	·	2.4 km	MPC · JPL
74021	1998 HP_{1}	—	April 19, 1998	Stroncone	Santa Lucia	·	2.0 km	MPC · JPL
74022	1998 HG_{2}	—	April 18, 1998	Kitt Peak	Spacewatch	·	1.3 km	MPC · JPL
74023	1998 HK_{4}	—	April 21, 1998	Kitt Peak	Spacewatch	·	1.7 km	MPC · JPL
74024 Hrabě	1998 HR_{4}	Hrabě	April 23, 1998	Kleť	M. Tichý, J. Tichá	MAS	1.5 km	MPC · JPL
74025 Marquette	1998 HA_{6}	Marquette	April 21, 1998	Caussols	ODAS	·	2.0 km	MPC · JPL
74026	1998 HL_{8}	—	April 22, 1998	Woomera	F. B. Zoltowski	·	2.5 km	MPC · JPL
74027	1998 HG_{18}	—	April 18, 1998	Socorro	LINEAR	·	1.7 km	MPC · JPL
74028	1998 HR_{18}	—	April 18, 1998	Socorro	LINEAR	ERI	3.9 km	MPC · JPL
74029	1998 HR_{19}	—	April 18, 1998	Socorro	LINEAR	V	1.6 km	MPC · JPL
74030	1998 HF_{21}	—	April 20, 1998	Socorro	LINEAR	V	1.4 km	MPC · JPL
74031	1998 HM_{22}	—	April 20, 1998	Socorro	LINEAR	NYS	2.0 km	MPC · JPL
74032	1998 HR_{27}	—	April 22, 1998	Kitt Peak	Spacewatch	·	2.0 km	MPC · JPL
74033	1998 HW_{27}	—	April 22, 1998	Kitt Peak	Spacewatch	·	1.5 km	MPC · JPL
74034	1998 HX_{31}	—	April 20, 1998	Socorro	LINEAR	·	2.4 km	MPC · JPL
74035	1998 HF_{44}	—	April 20, 1998	Socorro	LINEAR	(5)	1.9 km	MPC · JPL
74036	1998 HR_{45}	—	April 20, 1998	Socorro	LINEAR	·	1.5 km	MPC · JPL
74037	1998 HB_{55}	—	April 21, 1998	Socorro	LINEAR	·	1.7 km	MPC · JPL
74038	1998 HE_{74}	—	April 21, 1998	Socorro	LINEAR	·	2.3 km	MPC · JPL
74039	1998 HA_{80}	—	April 21, 1998	Socorro	LINEAR	·	1.4 km	MPC · JPL
74040	1998 HU_{83}	—	April 21, 1998	Socorro	LINEAR	·	4.4 km	MPC · JPL
74041	1998 HC_{88}	—	April 21, 1998	Socorro	LINEAR	·	4.5 km	MPC · JPL
74042	1998 HX_{92}	—	April 21, 1998	Socorro	LINEAR	·	1.7 km	MPC · JPL
74043	1998 HV_{96}	—	April 21, 1998	Socorro	LINEAR	·	2.3 km	MPC · JPL
74044	1998 HQ_{98}	—	April 21, 1998	Socorro	LINEAR	·	5.5 km	MPC · JPL
74045	1998 HG_{102}	—	April 25, 1998	La Silla	E. W. Elst	·	1.7 km	MPC · JPL
74046	1998 HX_{102}	—	April 25, 1998	La Silla	E. W. Elst	NYS	2.0 km	MPC · JPL
74047	1998 HF_{107}	—	April 23, 1998	Socorro	LINEAR	·	2.7 km	MPC · JPL
74048	1998 HP_{121}	—	April 23, 1998	Socorro	LINEAR	·	1.5 km	MPC · JPL
74049	1998 HA_{123}	—	April 23, 1998	Socorro	LINEAR	·	2.0 km	MPC · JPL
74050	1998 HF_{127}	—	April 18, 1998	Socorro	LINEAR	·	1.5 km	MPC · JPL
74051	1998 HP_{150}	—	April 20, 1998	Kitt Peak	Spacewatch	3:2	8.4 km	MPC · JPL
74052	1998 JB_{1}	—	May 1, 1998	Haleakala	NEAT	·	2.3 km	MPC · JPL
74053	1998 JV_{3}	—	May 6, 1998	Caussols	ODAS	·	2.9 km	MPC · JPL
74054	1998 JT_{4}	—	May 1, 1998	Socorro	LINEAR	3:2	11 km	MPC · JPL
74055	1998 KY_{6}	—	May 22, 1998	Anderson Mesa	LONEOS	·	3.6 km	MPC · JPL
74056	1998 KM_{9}	—	May 28, 1998	Prescott	P. G. Comba	·	2.4 km	MPC · JPL
74057	1998 KW_{12}	—	May 22, 1998	Socorro	LINEAR	·	2.5 km	MPC · JPL
74058	1998 KQ_{18}	—	May 22, 1998	Socorro	LINEAR	·	2.1 km	MPC · JPL
74059	1998 KJ_{20}	—	May 22, 1998	Socorro	LINEAR	NYS	2.2 km	MPC · JPL
74060	1998 KJ_{24}	—	May 22, 1998	Socorro	LINEAR	·	1.8 km	MPC · JPL
74061	1998 KK_{28}	—	May 22, 1998	Socorro	LINEAR	·	1.7 km	MPC · JPL
74062	1998 KR_{33}	—	May 22, 1998	Socorro	LINEAR	·	1.7 km	MPC · JPL
74063	1998 KQ_{39}	—	May 22, 1998	Socorro	LINEAR	·	3.0 km	MPC · JPL
74064	1998 KZ_{41}	—	May 26, 1998	Kitt Peak	Spacewatch	·	2.4 km	MPC · JPL
74065	1998 KS_{61}	—	May 23, 1998	Socorro	LINEAR	·	5.4 km	MPC · JPL
74066	1998 KH_{65}	—	May 22, 1998	Socorro	LINEAR	·	2.0 km	MPC · JPL
74067	1998 MH_{3}	—	June 16, 1998	Kitt Peak	Spacewatch	·	8.5 km	MPC · JPL
74068	1998 MJ_{4}	—	June 22, 1998	Prescott	P. G. Comba	·	1.7 km	MPC · JPL
74069	1998 MO_{7}	—	June 22, 1998	Woomera	F. B. Zoltowski	PHO	2.4 km	MPC · JPL
74070	1998 MC_{9}	—	June 19, 1998	Socorro	LINEAR	·	4.8 km	MPC · JPL
74071	1998 MH_{9}	—	June 19, 1998	Socorro	LINEAR	·	3.1 km	MPC · JPL
74072	1998 MK_{9}	—	June 19, 1998	Socorro	LINEAR	(5)	2.4 km	MPC · JPL
74073	1998 MO_{13}	—	June 24, 1998	Socorro	LINEAR	·	3.2 km	MPC · JPL
74074	1998 MC_{29}	—	June 24, 1998	Socorro	LINEAR	·	2.4 km	MPC · JPL
74075	1998 MG_{29}	—	June 24, 1998	Socorro	LINEAR	·	3.1 km	MPC · JPL
74076	1998 MT_{33}	—	June 24, 1998	Socorro	LINEAR	·	2.5 km	MPC · JPL
74077	1998 MA_{47}	—	June 28, 1998	La Silla	E. W. Elst	·	2.9 km	MPC · JPL
74078	1998 NP	—	July 3, 1998	Woomera	F. B. Zoltowski	EUN	2.6 km	MPC · JPL
74079	1998 NS	—	July 11, 1998	Woomera	F. B. Zoltowski	·	2.6 km	MPC · JPL
74080 Philippestée	1998 OW	Philippestée	July 20, 1998	Caussols	ODAS	·	3.1 km	MPC · JPL
74081	1998 OU_{1}	—	July 24, 1998	Haleakala	NEAT	·	2.4 km	MPC · JPL
74082	1998 OM_{3}	—	July 23, 1998	Caussols	ODAS	·	2.8 km	MPC · JPL
74083	1998 OF_{6}	—	July 30, 1998	Višnjan Observatory	Višnjan	EUN	2.6 km	MPC · JPL
74084	1998 OA_{10}	—	July 26, 1998	La Silla	E. W. Elst	·	3.1 km	MPC · JPL
74085	1998 OB_{12}	—	July 22, 1998	Reedy Creek	J. Broughton	(5)	3.5 km	MPC · JPL
74086	1998 OE_{12}	—	July 28, 1998	Reedy Creek	J. Broughton	·	2.8 km	MPC · JPL
74087	1998 OS_{13}	—	July 26, 1998	La Silla	E. W. Elst	EUN	2.8 km	MPC · JPL
74088	1998 OK_{14}	—	July 26, 1998	La Silla	E. W. Elst	·	2.8 km	MPC · JPL
74089	1998 OJ_{15}	—	July 20, 1998	Haleakala	NEAT	·	4.0 km	MPC · JPL
74090	1998 QU	—	August 18, 1998	Majorca	Á. López J., R. Pacheco	·	3.6 km	MPC · JPL
74091	1998 QH_{3}	—	August 17, 1998	Socorro	LINEAR	·	11 km	MPC · JPL
74092 Xiangda	1998 QJ_{5}	Xiangda	August 22, 1998	Xinglong	SCAP	·	3.5 km	MPC · JPL
74093 Manuelalippi	1998 QU_{6}	Manuelalippi	August 24, 1998	Caussols	ODAS	PHO	3.6 km	MPC · JPL
74094	1998 QU_{8}	—	August 17, 1998	Socorro	LINEAR	EUN	4.3 km	MPC · JPL
74095	1998 QC_{15}	—	August 17, 1998	Socorro	LINEAR	GEF	2.9 km	MPC · JPL
74096	1998 QD_{15}	—	August 17, 1998	Socorro	LINEAR	NYS	3.0 km	MPC · JPL
74097	1998 QX_{15}	—	August 17, 1998	Bergisch Gladbach	W. Bickel	ADE	5.1 km	MPC · JPL
74098	1998 QA_{21}	—	August 17, 1998	Socorro	LINEAR	MAR	3.0 km	MPC · JPL
74099	1998 QK_{22}	—	August 17, 1998	Socorro	LINEAR	·	3.0 km	MPC · JPL
74100	1998 QE_{26}	—	August 25, 1998	Višnjan Observatory	Višnjan	·	7.5 km	MPC · JPL

== 74101–74200 ==
back to top

Designation			Discovery			Properties		Ref
Permanent	Provisional	Named after	Date	Site	Discoverer(s)	Category	Diam.	Ref
74101	1998 QS_{30}	—	August 17, 1998	Socorro	LINEAR	·	4.2 km	MPC · JPL
74102	1998 QX_{30}	—	August 17, 1998	Socorro	LINEAR	NYS	3.4 km	MPC · JPL
74103	1998 QP_{31}	—	August 17, 1998	Socorro	LINEAR	·	2.7 km	MPC · JPL
74104	1998 QK_{35}	—	August 17, 1998	Socorro	LINEAR	·	2.9 km	MPC · JPL
74105	1998 QW_{35}	—	August 17, 1998	Socorro	LINEAR	(5)	5.5 km	MPC · JPL
74106	1998 QS_{36}	—	August 17, 1998	Socorro	LINEAR	MAR	2.4 km	MPC · JPL
74107	1998 QM_{37}	—	August 17, 1998	Socorro	LINEAR	V · slow	3.1 km	MPC · JPL
74108	1998 QP_{37}	—	August 17, 1998	Socorro	LINEAR	·	2.8 km	MPC · JPL
74109	1998 QT_{37}	—	August 17, 1998	Socorro	LINEAR	·	3.7 km	MPC · JPL
74110	1998 QU_{37}	—	August 17, 1998	Socorro	LINEAR	·	6.6 km	MPC · JPL
74111	1998 QD_{39}	—	August 17, 1998	Socorro	LINEAR	·	1.9 km	MPC · JPL
74112	1998 QE_{40}	—	August 17, 1998	Socorro	LINEAR	·	3.1 km	MPC · JPL
74113	1998 QZ_{42}	—	August 17, 1998	Socorro	LINEAR	·	5.2 km	MPC · JPL
74114	1998 QV_{46}	—	August 17, 1998	Socorro	LINEAR	·	4.6 km	MPC · JPL
74115	1998 QR_{48}	—	August 17, 1998	Socorro	LINEAR	·	4.3 km	MPC · JPL
74116	1998 QL_{49}	—	August 17, 1998	Socorro	LINEAR	·	5.1 km	MPC · JPL
74117	1998 QG_{50}	—	August 17, 1998	Socorro	LINEAR	EUN	4.7 km	MPC · JPL
74118	1998 QS_{50}	—	August 17, 1998	Socorro	LINEAR	·	6.4 km	MPC · JPL
74119	1998 QH_{52}	—	August 17, 1998	Socorro	LINEAR	·	8.3 km	MPC · JPL
74120	1998 QJ_{53}	—	August 20, 1998	Anderson Mesa	LONEOS	·	3.6 km	MPC · JPL
74121	1998 QT_{53}	—	August 28, 1998	Woomera	F. B. Zoltowski	·	2.1 km	MPC · JPL
74122	1998 QU_{54}	—	August 27, 1998	Anderson Mesa	LONEOS	·	3.1 km	MPC · JPL
74123	1998 QG_{56}	—	August 28, 1998	Socorro	LINEAR	·	4.9 km	MPC · JPL
74124	1998 QB_{58}	—	August 30, 1998	Kitt Peak	Spacewatch	·	5.1 km	MPC · JPL
74125	1998 QD_{59}	—	August 26, 1998	Kitt Peak	Spacewatch	·	2.4 km	MPC · JPL
74126	1998 QV_{60}	—	August 23, 1998	Anderson Mesa	LONEOS	V	1.6 km	MPC · JPL
74127	1998 QG_{61}	—	August 23, 1998	Anderson Mesa	LONEOS	·	2.4 km	MPC · JPL
74128	1998 QA_{66}	—	August 24, 1998	Socorro	LINEAR	·	3.2 km	MPC · JPL
74129	1998 QT_{67}	—	August 24, 1998	Socorro	LINEAR	EUN	2.2 km	MPC · JPL
74130	1998 QC_{68}	—	August 24, 1998	Socorro	LINEAR	EUN	2.7 km	MPC · JPL
74131	1998 QN_{69}	—	August 24, 1998	Socorro	LINEAR	MAR	2.7 km	MPC · JPL
74132	1998 QN_{71}	—	August 24, 1998	Socorro	LINEAR	·	2.3 km	MPC · JPL
74133	1998 QV_{71}	—	August 24, 1998	Socorro	LINEAR	·	2.8 km	MPC · JPL
74134	1998 QG_{72}	—	August 24, 1998	Socorro	LINEAR	·	2.7 km	MPC · JPL
74135	1998 QL_{72}	—	August 24, 1998	Socorro	LINEAR	·	3.1 km	MPC · JPL
74136	1998 QP_{73}	—	August 24, 1998	Socorro	LINEAR	EUN	2.7 km	MPC · JPL
74137	1998 QY_{74}	—	August 24, 1998	Socorro	LINEAR	·	4.1 km	MPC · JPL
74138	1998 QD_{75}	—	August 24, 1998	Socorro	LINEAR	·	3.7 km	MPC · JPL
74139	1998 QC_{77}	—	August 24, 1998	Socorro	LINEAR	·	5.9 km	MPC · JPL
74140	1998 QD_{77}	—	August 24, 1998	Socorro	LINEAR	GEF	3.4 km	MPC · JPL
74141	1998 QK_{77}	—	August 24, 1998	Socorro	LINEAR	·	4.1 km	MPC · JPL
74142	1998 QL_{77}	—	August 24, 1998	Socorro	LINEAR	·	6.4 km	MPC · JPL
74143	1998 QP_{77}	—	August 24, 1998	Socorro	LINEAR	HNS	4.7 km	MPC · JPL
74144	1998 QV_{77}	—	August 24, 1998	Socorro	LINEAR	·	4.4 km	MPC · JPL
74145	1998 QO_{84}	—	August 24, 1998	Socorro	LINEAR	·	7.6 km	MPC · JPL
74146	1998 QS_{84}	—	August 24, 1998	Socorro	LINEAR	·	5.2 km	MPC · JPL
74147	1998 QR_{86}	—	August 24, 1998	Socorro	LINEAR	·	6.7 km	MPC · JPL
74148	1998 QP_{87}	—	August 24, 1998	Socorro	LINEAR	·	5.2 km	MPC · JPL
74149	1998 QE_{88}	—	August 24, 1998	Socorro	LINEAR	MAR	3.6 km	MPC · JPL
74150	1998 QR_{89}	—	August 24, 1998	Socorro	LINEAR	·	7.1 km	MPC · JPL
74151	1998 QD_{90}	—	August 24, 1998	Socorro	LINEAR	·	4.2 km	MPC · JPL
74152	1998 QH_{90}	—	August 24, 1998	Socorro	LINEAR	·	4.9 km	MPC · JPL
74153	1998 QJ_{90}	—	August 24, 1998	Socorro	LINEAR	·	5.1 km	MPC · JPL
74154	1998 QM_{91}	—	August 28, 1998	Socorro	LINEAR	·	4.2 km	MPC · JPL
74155	1998 QK_{93}	—	August 28, 1998	Socorro	LINEAR	EUN	5.9 km	MPC · JPL
74156	1998 QH_{95}	—	August 19, 1998	Socorro	LINEAR	EUN	2.8 km	MPC · JPL
74157	1998 QK_{96}	—	August 19, 1998	Socorro	LINEAR	·	2.7 km	MPC · JPL
74158	1998 QU_{97}	—	August 24, 1998	Socorro	LINEAR	PHO	2.8 km	MPC · JPL
74159	1998 QA_{100}	—	August 26, 1998	La Silla	E. W. Elst	·	4.3 km	MPC · JPL
74160	1998 QE_{101}	—	August 26, 1998	La Silla	E. W. Elst	BAR	2.7 km	MPC · JPL
74161	1998 QF_{101}	—	August 26, 1998	La Silla	E. W. Elst	MIS	4.9 km	MPC · JPL
74162	1998 QR_{102}	—	August 26, 1998	La Silla	E. W. Elst	·	4.3 km	MPC · JPL
74163	1998 QA_{104}	—	August 26, 1998	La Silla	E. W. Elst	·	2.9 km	MPC · JPL
74164	1998 QL_{104}	—	August 26, 1998	La Silla	E. W. Elst	(5)	2.7 km	MPC · JPL
74165	1998 QU_{104}	—	August 26, 1998	La Silla	E. W. Elst	·	2.7 km	MPC · JPL
74166	1998 QO_{109}	—	August 19, 1998	Haleakala	NEAT	·	4.1 km	MPC · JPL
74167	1998 RF_{2}	—	September 15, 1998	Caussols	ODAS	·	5.5 km	MPC · JPL
74168 Quentinleicht	1998 RK_{2}	Quentinleicht	September 15, 1998	Caussols	ODAS	HOF	5.0 km	MPC · JPL
74169	1998 RX_{2}	—	September 13, 1998	Kitt Peak	Spacewatch	·	4.9 km	MPC · JPL
74170	1998 RB_{3}	—	September 13, 1998	Kitt Peak	Spacewatch	MAS	1.2 km	MPC · JPL
74171	1998 RA_{6}	—	September 13, 1998	Anderson Mesa	LONEOS	·	4.8 km	MPC · JPL
74172	1998 RX_{7}	—	September 12, 1998	Kitt Peak	Spacewatch	·	3.2 km	MPC · JPL
74173	1998 RL_{8}	—	September 12, 1998	Kitt Peak	Spacewatch	·	2.9 km	MPC · JPL
74174	1998 RL_{11}	—	September 13, 1998	Kitt Peak	Spacewatch	·	4.0 km	MPC · JPL
74175	1998 RX_{13}	—	September 13, 1998	Kitt Peak	Spacewatch	·	3.3 km	MPC · JPL
74176	1998 RF_{17}	—	September 14, 1998	Socorro	LINEAR	·	2.1 km	MPC · JPL
74177	1998 RZ_{18}	—	September 14, 1998	Socorro	LINEAR	·	3.6 km	MPC · JPL
74178	1998 RD_{19}	—	September 14, 1998	Socorro	LINEAR	EUN	2.4 km	MPC · JPL
74179	1998 RZ_{23}	—	September 14, 1998	Socorro	LINEAR	·	2.3 km	MPC · JPL
74180	1998 RK_{26}	—	September 14, 1998	Socorro	LINEAR	EUN	2.4 km	MPC · JPL
74181	1998 RB_{28}	—	September 14, 1998	Socorro	LINEAR	MAR	2.4 km	MPC · JPL
74182	1998 RR_{30}	—	September 14, 1998	Socorro	LINEAR	·	5.7 km	MPC · JPL
74183	1998 RF_{39}	—	September 14, 1998	Socorro	LINEAR	·	4.8 km	MPC · JPL
74184	1998 RM_{39}	—	September 14, 1998	Socorro	LINEAR	V	2.1 km	MPC · JPL
74185	1998 RV_{39}	—	September 14, 1998	Socorro	LINEAR	·	2.1 km	MPC · JPL
74186	1998 RJ_{40}	—	September 14, 1998	Socorro	LINEAR	V	2.9 km	MPC · JPL
74187	1998 RZ_{40}	—	September 14, 1998	Socorro	LINEAR	·	2.0 km	MPC · JPL
74188	1998 RC_{43}	—	September 14, 1998	Socorro	LINEAR	·	2.5 km	MPC · JPL
74189	1998 RM_{43}	—	September 14, 1998	Socorro	LINEAR	·	4.5 km	MPC · JPL
74190	1998 RA_{44}	—	September 14, 1998	Socorro	LINEAR	·	2.7 km	MPC · JPL
74191	1998 RK_{45}	—	September 14, 1998	Socorro	LINEAR	·	4.3 km	MPC · JPL
74192	1998 RV_{45}	—	September 14, 1998	Socorro	LINEAR	·	2.9 km	MPC · JPL
74193	1998 RW_{45}	—	September 14, 1998	Socorro	LINEAR	·	2.5 km	MPC · JPL
74194	1998 RL_{48}	—	September 14, 1998	Socorro	LINEAR	·	5.5 km	MPC · JPL
74195	1998 RJ_{49}	—	September 14, 1998	Socorro	LINEAR	·	2.7 km	MPC · JPL
74196	1998 RU_{49}	—	September 14, 1998	Socorro	LINEAR	NYS	3.4 km	MPC · JPL
74197	1998 RX_{49}	—	September 14, 1998	Socorro	LINEAR	·	3.0 km	MPC · JPL
74198	1998 RA_{50}	—	September 14, 1998	Socorro	LINEAR	·	2.3 km	MPC · JPL
74199	1998 RA_{52}	—	September 14, 1998	Socorro	LINEAR	·	3.3 km	MPC · JPL
74200	1998 RB_{53}	—	September 14, 1998	Socorro	LINEAR	·	2.7 km	MPC · JPL

== 74201–74300 ==
back to top

Designation			Discovery			Properties		Ref
Permanent	Provisional	Named after	Date	Site	Discoverer(s)	Category	Diam.	Ref
74201	1998 RR_{55}	—	September 14, 1998	Socorro	LINEAR	·	2.2 km	MPC · JPL
74202	1998 RL_{56}	—	September 14, 1998	Socorro	LINEAR	·	4.0 km	MPC · JPL
74203	1998 RN_{56}	—	September 14, 1998	Socorro	LINEAR	PHO · slow	3.6 km	MPC · JPL
74204	1998 RH_{58}	—	September 14, 1998	Socorro	LINEAR	·	4.5 km	MPC · JPL
74205	1998 RS_{58}	—	September 14, 1998	Socorro	LINEAR	·	3.6 km	MPC · JPL
74206	1998 RY_{58}	—	September 14, 1998	Socorro	LINEAR	·	3.3 km	MPC · JPL
74207	1998 RJ_{59}	—	September 14, 1998	Socorro	LINEAR	·	2.4 km	MPC · JPL
74208	1998 RD_{60}	—	September 14, 1998	Socorro	LINEAR	MAR	2.4 km	MPC · JPL
74209	1998 RJ_{60}	—	September 14, 1998	Socorro	LINEAR	·	4.1 km	MPC · JPL
74210	1998 RX_{60}	—	September 14, 1998	Socorro	LINEAR	·	6.5 km	MPC · JPL
74211	1998 RO_{65}	—	September 14, 1998	Socorro	LINEAR	·	2.2 km	MPC · JPL
74212	1998 RS_{66}	—	September 14, 1998	Socorro	LINEAR	·	4.1 km	MPC · JPL
74213	1998 RD_{67}	—	September 14, 1998	Socorro	LINEAR	PHO	3.2 km	MPC · JPL
74214	1998 RO_{68}	—	September 14, 1998	Socorro	LINEAR	EUN	3.4 km	MPC · JPL
74215	1998 RV_{68}	—	September 14, 1998	Socorro	LINEAR	·	4.6 km	MPC · JPL
74216	1998 RX_{70}	—	September 14, 1998	Socorro	LINEAR	·	3.6 km	MPC · JPL
74217	1998 RB_{73}	—	September 14, 1998	Socorro	LINEAR	·	4.8 km	MPC · JPL
74218	1998 RW_{73}	—	September 14, 1998	Socorro	LINEAR	·	4.6 km	MPC · JPL
74219	1998 RM_{78}	—	September 14, 1998	Socorro	LINEAR	V	4.0 km	MPC · JPL
74220	1998 RX_{78}	—	September 14, 1998	Socorro	LINEAR	·	4.2 km	MPC · JPL
74221	1998 RU_{80}	—	September 14, 1998	Socorro	LINEAR	·	4.2 km	MPC · JPL
74222	1998 RZ_{80}	—	September 15, 1998	Anderson Mesa	LONEOS	·	2.3 km	MPC · JPL
74223	1998 RD_{81}	—	September 15, 1998	Anderson Mesa	LONEOS	MRX	2.0 km	MPC · JPL
74224	1998 SX_{1}	—	September 16, 1998	Caussols	ODAS	·	4.0 km	MPC · JPL
74225	1998 SR_{9}	—	September 17, 1998	Xinglong	SCAP	·	3.4 km	MPC · JPL
74226	1998 SZ_{12}	—	September 21, 1998	Goodricke-Pigott	R. A. Tucker	·	2.9 km	MPC · JPL
74227 Kraan-Korteweg	1998 SR_{13}	Kraan-Korteweg	September 23, 1998	Caussols	ODAS	·	5.1 km	MPC · JPL
74228	1998 SJ_{15}	—	September 16, 1998	Kitt Peak	Spacewatch	·	5.6 km	MPC · JPL
74229	1998 SE_{18}	—	September 17, 1998	Kitt Peak	Spacewatch	·	3.1 km	MPC · JPL
74230	1998 SN_{23}	—	September 17, 1998	Anderson Mesa	LONEOS	(5)	2.4 km	MPC · JPL
74231	1998 SS_{24}	—	September 17, 1998	Anderson Mesa	LONEOS	·	3.0 km	MPC · JPL
74232	1998 ST_{26}	—	September 24, 1998	Ondřejov	P. Pravec	EOS	5.3 km	MPC · JPL
74233	1998 SU_{35}	—	September 24, 1998	Caussols	ODAS	·	3.5 km	MPC · JPL
74234	1998 SW_{36}	—	September 20, 1998	Kitt Peak	Spacewatch	(5)	2.5 km	MPC · JPL
74235	1998 SF_{42}	—	September 27, 1998	Kitt Peak	Spacewatch	·	2.5 km	MPC · JPL
74236	1998 SC_{47}	—	September 25, 1998	Kitt Peak	Spacewatch	·	2.4 km	MPC · JPL
74237	1998 SX_{47}	—	September 26, 1998	Kitt Peak	Spacewatch	(7744)	3.1 km	MPC · JPL
74238	1998 SM_{48}	—	September 27, 1998	Kitt Peak	Spacewatch	·	2.9 km	MPC · JPL
74239	1998 SP_{48}	—	September 27, 1998	Kitt Peak	Spacewatch	·	3.0 km	MPC · JPL
74240	1998 SY_{52}	—	September 30, 1998	Kitt Peak	Spacewatch	·	3.9 km	MPC · JPL
74241	1998 SM_{54}	—	September 16, 1998	Anderson Mesa	LONEOS	·	3.5 km	MPC · JPL
74242	1998 SY_{54}	—	September 16, 1998	Anderson Mesa	LONEOS	·	3.8 km	MPC · JPL
74243	1998 SR_{55}	—	September 16, 1998	Anderson Mesa	LONEOS	·	4.1 km	MPC · JPL
74244	1998 SS_{57}	—	September 17, 1998	Anderson Mesa	LONEOS	·	3.3 km	MPC · JPL
74245	1998 SO_{59}	—	September 17, 1998	Anderson Mesa	LONEOS	·	8.3 km	MPC · JPL
74246	1998 SS_{62}	—	September 23, 1998	Xinglong	SCAP	·	2.6 km	MPC · JPL
74247	1998 SR_{64}	—	September 20, 1998	La Silla	E. W. Elst	WIT	2.2 km	MPC · JPL
74248	1998 SS_{64}	—	September 20, 1998	La Silla	E. W. Elst	·	3.3 km	MPC · JPL
74249	1998 SB_{65}	—	September 20, 1998	La Silla	E. W. Elst	RAF · slow	4.2 km	MPC · JPL
74250	1998 SN_{65}	—	September 20, 1998	La Silla	E. W. Elst	DOR	6.9 km	MPC · JPL
74251	1998 SV_{66}	—	September 20, 1998	La Silla	E. W. Elst	AGN	3.5 km	MPC · JPL
74252	1998 SS_{72}	—	September 21, 1998	La Silla	E. W. Elst	V	2.5 km	MPC · JPL
74253	1998 SR_{74}	—	September 21, 1998	La Silla	E. W. Elst	·	8.5 km	MPC · JPL
74254	1998 SA_{75}	—	September 21, 1998	La Silla	E. W. Elst	·	4.2 km	MPC · JPL
74255	1998 SL_{76}	—	September 19, 1998	Socorro	LINEAR	·	3.5 km	MPC · JPL
74256	1998 SS_{77}	—	September 26, 1998	Socorro	LINEAR	GEF	2.7 km	MPC · JPL
74257	1998 SR_{79}	—	September 26, 1998	Socorro	LINEAR	·	1.9 km	MPC · JPL
74258	1998 SY_{79}	—	September 26, 1998	Socorro	LINEAR	PAD	3.6 km	MPC · JPL
74259	1998 SC_{80}	—	September 26, 1998	Socorro	LINEAR	·	2.9 km	MPC · JPL
74260	1998 SS_{80}	—	September 26, 1998	Socorro	LINEAR	·	3.1 km	MPC · JPL
74261	1998 SO_{84}	—	September 26, 1998	Socorro	LINEAR	ERI	4.9 km	MPC · JPL
74262	1998 SO_{87}	—	September 26, 1998	Socorro	LINEAR	AGN	3.0 km	MPC · JPL
74263	1998 SH_{89}	—	September 26, 1998	Socorro	LINEAR	·	3.5 km	MPC · JPL
74264	1998 SS_{93}	—	September 26, 1998	Socorro	LINEAR	·	2.2 km	MPC · JPL
74265	1998 SQ_{95}	—	September 26, 1998	Socorro	LINEAR	·	3.6 km	MPC · JPL
74266	1998 SH_{102}	—	September 26, 1998	Socorro	LINEAR	·	4.5 km	MPC · JPL
74267	1998 SY_{107}	—	September 26, 1998	Socorro	LINEAR	EUN	3.8 km	MPC · JPL
74268	1998 SK_{109}	—	September 26, 1998	Socorro	LINEAR	·	5.0 km	MPC · JPL
74269	1998 SQ_{109}	—	September 26, 1998	Socorro	LINEAR	·	2.7 km	MPC · JPL
74270	1998 SR_{110}	—	September 26, 1998	Socorro	LINEAR	EUN	2.7 km	MPC · JPL
74271	1998 SK_{111}	—	September 26, 1998	Socorro	LINEAR	·	4.0 km	MPC · JPL
74272	1998 SC_{112}	—	September 26, 1998	Socorro	LINEAR	V	2.7 km	MPC · JPL
74273	1998 SL_{113}	—	September 26, 1998	Socorro	LINEAR	·	4.3 km	MPC · JPL
74274	1998 SZ_{116}	—	September 26, 1998	Socorro	LINEAR	EUN	2.7 km	MPC · JPL
74275	1998 SB_{117}	—	September 26, 1998	Socorro	LINEAR	DOR	5.9 km	MPC · JPL
74276	1998 SZ_{118}	—	September 26, 1998	Socorro	LINEAR	·	4.5 km	MPC · JPL
74277	1998 SE_{119}	—	September 26, 1998	Socorro	LINEAR	·	3.6 km	MPC · JPL
74278	1998 SR_{119}	—	September 26, 1998	Socorro	LINEAR	·	5.5 km	MPC · JPL
74279	1998 SC_{123}	—	September 26, 1998	Socorro	LINEAR	·	3.5 km	MPC · JPL
74280	1998 ST_{124}	—	September 26, 1998	Socorro	LINEAR	·	2.6 km	MPC · JPL
74281	1998 SE_{126}	—	September 26, 1998	Socorro	LINEAR	·	8.1 km	MPC · JPL
74282	1998 SC_{128}	—	September 26, 1998	Socorro	LINEAR	·	3.0 km	MPC · JPL
74283	1998 SJ_{130}	—	September 26, 1998	Socorro	LINEAR	slow	3.8 km	MPC · JPL
74284	1998 SV_{130}	—	September 26, 1998	Socorro	LINEAR	·	5.1 km	MPC · JPL
74285	1998 SR_{131}	—	September 26, 1998	Socorro	LINEAR	GEF	3.2 km	MPC · JPL
74286	1998 SX_{132}	—	September 26, 1998	Socorro	LINEAR	·	4.3 km	MPC · JPL
74287	1998 SS_{133}	—	September 26, 1998	Socorro	LINEAR	·	4.9 km	MPC · JPL
74288	1998 SG_{134}	—	September 26, 1998	Socorro	LINEAR	·	3.2 km	MPC · JPL
74289	1998 SX_{135}	—	September 26, 1998	Socorro	LINEAR	·	5.8 km	MPC · JPL
74290	1998 SQ_{136}	—	September 26, 1998	Socorro	LINEAR	V	2.5 km	MPC · JPL
74291	1998 SU_{136}	—	September 26, 1998	Socorro	LINEAR	·	3.1 km	MPC · JPL
74292	1998 SW_{138}	—	September 26, 1998	Socorro	LINEAR	·	3.4 km	MPC · JPL
74293	1998 SF_{140}	—	September 26, 1998	Socorro	LINEAR	·	3.2 km	MPC · JPL
74294	1998 SG_{140}	—	September 26, 1998	Socorro	LINEAR	·	5.1 km	MPC · JPL
74295	1998 SR_{147}	—	September 20, 1998	La Silla	E. W. Elst	·	4.8 km	MPC · JPL
74296	1998 SV_{147}	—	September 20, 1998	La Silla	E. W. Elst	EUN	3.3 km	MPC · JPL
74297	1998 SZ_{147}	—	September 20, 1998	La Silla	E. W. Elst	·	5.4 km	MPC · JPL
74298	1998 SG_{152}	—	September 26, 1998	Socorro	LINEAR	(29841)	2.8 km	MPC · JPL
74299	1998 SQ_{152}	—	September 26, 1998	Socorro	LINEAR	·	6.3 km	MPC · JPL
74300	1998 SA_{153}	—	September 26, 1998	Socorro	LINEAR	·	2.6 km	MPC · JPL

== 74301–74400 ==
back to top

Designation			Discovery			Properties		Ref
Permanent	Provisional	Named after	Date	Site	Discoverer(s)	Category	Diam.	Ref
74301	1998 SK_{163}	—	September 26, 1998	Socorro	LINEAR	·	3.6 km	MPC · JPL
74302	1998 TG_{1}	—	October 12, 1998	Kitt Peak	Spacewatch	·	2.7 km	MPC · JPL
74303	1998 TN_{3}	—	October 14, 1998	Socorro	LINEAR	EUN	2.9 km	MPC · JPL
74304	1998 TA_{13}	—	October 13, 1998	Kitt Peak	Spacewatch	·	2.5 km	MPC · JPL
74305	1998 TD_{13}	—	October 13, 1998	Kitt Peak	Spacewatch	(29841)	3.5 km	MPC · JPL
74306	1998 TS_{29}	—	October 15, 1998	Kitt Peak	Spacewatch	KOR	2.0 km	MPC · JPL
74307	1998 TO_{30}	—	October 10, 1998	Anderson Mesa	LONEOS	·	3.9 km	MPC · JPL
74308	1998 TN_{31}	—	October 11, 1998	Anderson Mesa	LONEOS	·	3.0 km	MPC · JPL
74309	1998 TF_{32}	—	October 11, 1998	Anderson Mesa	LONEOS	·	3.8 km	MPC · JPL
74310	1998 TC_{33}	—	October 14, 1998	Anderson Mesa	LONEOS	·	4.3 km	MPC · JPL
74311	1998 TX_{37}	—	October 14, 1998	Anderson Mesa	LONEOS	·	2.5 km	MPC · JPL
74312	1998 UO_{6}	—	October 21, 1998	Kleť	Kleť	KOR	3.0 km	MPC · JPL
74313	1998 US_{6}	—	October 18, 1998	Gekko	T. Kagawa	·	3.6 km	MPC · JPL
74314	1998 UT_{7}	—	October 23, 1998	Višnjan Observatory	K. Korlević	·	4.7 km	MPC · JPL
74315	1998 UV_{11}	—	October 17, 1998	Kitt Peak	Spacewatch	·	4.6 km	MPC · JPL
74316	1998 UW_{15}	—	October 24, 1998	Višnjan Observatory	K. Korlević	·	3.0 km	MPC · JPL
74317 Marionbonafous	1998 UZ_{15}	Marionbonafous	October 21, 1998	Caussols	ODAS	·	2.7 km	MPC · JPL
74318	1998 UB_{16}	—	October 22, 1998	Caussols	ODAS	ADE	7.1 km	MPC · JPL
74319	1998 UH_{17}	—	October 17, 1998	Xinglong	SCAP	·	3.8 km	MPC · JPL
74320	1998 UX_{17}	—	October 19, 1998	Xinglong	SCAP	EOS	3.8 km	MPC · JPL
74321	1998 UT_{21}	—	October 28, 1998	Socorro	LINEAR	GEF	3.1 km	MPC · JPL
74322	1998 UN_{26}	—	October 18, 1998	La Silla	E. W. Elst	·	5.7 km	MPC · JPL
74323	1998 UM_{29}	—	October 18, 1998	La Silla	E. W. Elst	ADE	7.6 km	MPC · JPL
74324	1998 UP_{33}	—	October 28, 1998	Socorro	LINEAR	·	7.6 km	MPC · JPL
74325	1998 UV_{36}	—	October 28, 1998	Socorro	LINEAR	(5)	3.2 km	MPC · JPL
74326	1998 UU_{37}	—	October 28, 1998	Socorro	LINEAR	EUN	4.0 km	MPC · JPL
74327	1998 UT_{38}	—	October 28, 1998	Socorro	LINEAR	·	4.0 km	MPC · JPL
74328	1998 UB_{44}	—	October 16, 1998	Socorro	LINEAR	·	7.6 km	MPC · JPL
74329	1998 UU_{45}	—	October 24, 1998	Kitt Peak	Spacewatch	PAD	4.7 km	MPC · JPL
74330	1998 UH_{46}	—	October 24, 1998	Kitt Peak	Spacewatch	·	2.4 km	MPC · JPL
74331	1998 US_{47}	—	October 28, 1998	Kitt Peak	Spacewatch	·	7.2 km	MPC · JPL
74332	1998 VB_{9}	—	November 10, 1998	Socorro	LINEAR	ADE	4.1 km	MPC · JPL
74333	1998 VD_{11}	—	November 10, 1998	Socorro	LINEAR	·	3.3 km	MPC · JPL
74334	1998 VL_{11}	—	November 10, 1998	Socorro	LINEAR	·	3.0 km	MPC · JPL
74335	1998 VS_{12}	—	November 10, 1998	Socorro	LINEAR	·	3.9 km	MPC · JPL
74336	1998 VN_{14}	—	November 10, 1998	Socorro	LINEAR	MAR	4.2 km	MPC · JPL
74337	1998 VH_{15}	—	November 10, 1998	Socorro	LINEAR	·	3.1 km	MPC · JPL
74338	1998 VK_{15}	—	November 10, 1998	Socorro	LINEAR	·	7.3 km	MPC · JPL
74339	1998 VW_{16}	—	November 10, 1998	Socorro	LINEAR	·	2.9 km	MPC · JPL
74340	1998 VM_{19}	—	November 10, 1998	Socorro	LINEAR	·	3.3 km	MPC · JPL
74341	1998 VP_{22}	—	November 10, 1998	Socorro	LINEAR	EUN	2.7 km	MPC · JPL
74342	1998 VX_{26}	—	November 10, 1998	Socorro	LINEAR	MRX	2.6 km	MPC · JPL
74343	1998 VH_{29}	—	November 10, 1998	Socorro	LINEAR	EUN · slow	4.6 km	MPC · JPL
74344	1998 VD_{34}	—	November 14, 1998	Uenohara	N. Kawasato	·	4.4 km	MPC · JPL
74345	1998 VY_{45}	—	November 15, 1998	Anderson Mesa	LONEOS	·	5.1 km	MPC · JPL
74346	1998 VH_{47}	—	November 14, 1998	Kitt Peak	Spacewatch	·	3.2 km	MPC · JPL
74347	1998 VB_{49}	—	November 10, 1998	Socorro	LINEAR	·	3.7 km	MPC · JPL
74348	1998 VT_{53}	—	November 14, 1998	Socorro	LINEAR	·	4.6 km	MPC · JPL
74349	1998 VM_{54}	—	November 14, 1998	Socorro	LINEAR	·	3.5 km	MPC · JPL
74350	1998 VO_{54}	—	November 14, 1998	Socorro	LINEAR	MAR	4.7 km	MPC · JPL
74351	1998 VT_{54}	—	November 14, 1998	Socorro	LINEAR	MAR · fast	4.8 km	MPC · JPL
74352	1998 VA_{55}	—	November 11, 1998	Višnjan Observatory	Višnjan	·	4.6 km	MPC · JPL
74353	1998 WT_{4}	—	November 18, 1998	Catalina	CSS	·	5.5 km	MPC · JPL
74354	1998 WA_{6}	—	November 18, 1998	Kushiro	S. Ueda, H. Kaneda	·	4.8 km	MPC · JPL
74355	1998 WJ_{12}	—	November 21, 1998	Socorro	LINEAR	·	4.5 km	MPC · JPL
74356	1998 WP_{12}	—	November 21, 1998	Socorro	LINEAR	·	2.7 km	MPC · JPL
74357	1998 WZ_{12}	—	November 21, 1998	Socorro	LINEAR	DOR	7.0 km	MPC · JPL
74358	1998 WH_{13}	—	November 21, 1998	Socorro	LINEAR	(32418)	5.2 km	MPC · JPL
74359	1998 WK_{14}	—	November 21, 1998	Socorro	LINEAR	PAD	5.0 km	MPC · JPL
74360	1998 WO_{14}	—	November 21, 1998	Socorro	LINEAR	·	4.5 km	MPC · JPL
74361	1998 WK_{16}	—	November 21, 1998	Socorro	LINEAR	·	3.9 km	MPC · JPL
74362	1998 WY_{19}	—	November 29, 1998	Woomera	F. B. Zoltowski	EUN	3.3 km	MPC · JPL
74363	1998 WB_{23}	—	November 18, 1998	Socorro	LINEAR	·	4.5 km	MPC · JPL
74364	1998 WZ_{26}	—	November 16, 1998	Kitt Peak	Spacewatch	THM	6.3 km	MPC · JPL
74365	1998 WQ_{28}	—	November 21, 1998	Kitt Peak	Spacewatch	·	9.0 km	MPC · JPL
74366	1998 WZ_{39}	—	November 22, 1998	Kitt Peak	Spacewatch	·	2.6 km	MPC · JPL
74367	1998 WU_{40}	—	November 16, 1998	Socorro	LINEAR	·	4.2 km	MPC · JPL
74368	1998 WG_{41}	—	November 18, 1998	Socorro	LINEAR	EOS	3.6 km	MPC · JPL
74369	1998 WZ_{41}	—	November 24, 1998	Socorro	LINEAR	·	3.8 km	MPC · JPL
74370 Kolářjan	1998 XJ	Kolářjan	December 9, 1998	Kleť	M. Tichý, J. Tichá	·	6.4 km	MPC · JPL
74371 Jeanduprat	1998 XG_{1}	Jeanduprat	December 7, 1998	Caussols	ODAS	·	4.0 km	MPC · JPL
74372	1998 XL_{1}	—	December 7, 1998	Caussols	ODAS	·	4.1 km	MPC · JPL
74373 Théodoremonod	1998 XF_{2}	Théodoremonod	December 7, 1998	Caussols	ODAS	EOS	4.1 km	MPC · JPL
74374	1998 XN_{4}	—	December 9, 1998	Višnjan Observatory	K. Korlević	·	3.7 km	MPC · JPL
74375	1998 XY_{6}	—	December 8, 1998	Kitt Peak	Spacewatch	AST	3.6 km	MPC · JPL
74376	1998 XT_{7}	—	December 9, 1998	Kitt Peak	Spacewatch	·	2.9 km	MPC · JPL
74377	1998 XY_{7}	—	December 9, 1998	Kitt Peak	Spacewatch	·	3.2 km	MPC · JPL
74378	1998 XH_{11}	—	December 8, 1998	Bédoin	P. Antonini	EUN	4.4 km	MPC · JPL
74379	1998 XU_{12}	—	December 15, 1998	Višnjan Observatory	K. Korlević	·	4.9 km	MPC · JPL
74380	1998 XR_{13}	—	December 15, 1998	Caussols	ODAS	(12739)	2.7 km	MPC · JPL
74381	1998 XU_{15}	—	December 15, 1998	Kleť	Kleť	GEF	2.4 km	MPC · JPL
74382	1998 XZ_{15}	—	December 14, 1998	Socorro	LINEAR	·	8.3 km	MPC · JPL
74383	1998 XC_{18}	—	December 8, 1998	Kitt Peak	Spacewatch	KOR	2.5 km	MPC · JPL
74384	1998 XQ_{20}	—	December 10, 1998	Kitt Peak	Spacewatch	·	3.6 km	MPC · JPL
74385	1998 XH_{21}	—	December 10, 1998	Kitt Peak	Spacewatch	·	5.8 km	MPC · JPL
74386	1998 XG_{22}	—	December 11, 1998	Kitt Peak	Spacewatch	·	3.7 km	MPC · JPL
74387	1998 XW_{24}	—	December 12, 1998	Kitt Peak	Spacewatch	·	5.4 km	MPC · JPL
74388	1998 XG_{25}	—	December 13, 1998	Kitt Peak	Spacewatch	KOR	2.2 km	MPC · JPL
74389	1998 XR_{25}	—	December 14, 1998	Kitt Peak	Spacewatch	·	3.0 km	MPC · JPL
74390	1998 XK_{37}	—	December 14, 1998	Socorro	LINEAR	·	8.9 km	MPC · JPL
74391	1998 XC_{41}	—	December 14, 1998	Socorro	LINEAR	·	5.0 km	MPC · JPL
74392	1998 XN_{55}	—	December 15, 1998	Socorro	LINEAR	·	4.9 km	MPC · JPL
74393	1998 XX_{56}	—	December 15, 1998	Socorro	LINEAR	DOR	6.1 km	MPC · JPL
74394	1998 XO_{57}	—	December 15, 1998	Socorro	LINEAR	·	5.0 km	MPC · JPL
74395	1998 XY_{57}	—	December 15, 1998	Socorro	LINEAR	·	4.4 km	MPC · JPL
74396	1998 XK_{68}	—	December 14, 1998	Socorro	LINEAR	·	5.6 km	MPC · JPL
74397	1998 XS_{71}	—	December 14, 1998	Socorro	LINEAR	·	3.2 km	MPC · JPL
74398	1998 XD_{73}	—	December 14, 1998	Socorro	LINEAR	·	9.8 km	MPC · JPL
74399	1998 XR_{73}	—	December 14, 1998	Socorro	LINEAR	GEF	4.3 km	MPC · JPL
74400 Streaky	1998 XH_{97}	Streaky	December 11, 1998	Mérida	Naranjo, O. A.	EOS	8.3 km	MPC · JPL

== 74401–74500 ==
back to top

Designation			Discovery			Properties		Ref
Permanent	Provisional	Named after	Date	Site	Discoverer(s)	Category	Diam.	Ref
74401	1998 YZ	—	December 16, 1998	Kleť	Kleť	·	9.0 km	MPC · JPL
74402	1998 YP_{4}	—	December 19, 1998	Catalina	CSS	·	4.6 km	MPC · JPL
74403	1998 YR_{5}	—	December 21, 1998	Oizumi	T. Kobayashi	·	13 km	MPC · JPL
74404	1998 YU_{11}	—	December 19, 1998	Uenohara	N. Kawasato	·	7.9 km	MPC · JPL
74405	1998 YH_{13}	—	December 17, 1998	Kitt Peak	Spacewatch	·	7.8 km	MPC · JPL
74406	1998 YW_{13}	—	December 19, 1998	Kitt Peak	Spacewatch	·	4.0 km	MPC · JPL
74407	1998 YJ_{21}	—	December 26, 1998	Kitt Peak	Spacewatch	·	8.3 km	MPC · JPL
74408	1998 YX_{21}	—	December 26, 1998	Kitt Peak	Spacewatch	·	5.4 km	MPC · JPL
74409	1998 YN_{28}	—	December 16, 1998	Socorro	LINEAR	·	4.8 km	MPC · JPL
74410	1999 AX_{4}	—	January 11, 1999	Oizumi	T. Kobayashi	H	2.5 km	MPC · JPL
74411	1999 AE_{5}	—	January 15, 1999	Kitt Peak	Spacewatch	·	6.5 km	MPC · JPL
74412	1999 AZ_{7}	—	January 13, 1999	Oizumi	T. Kobayashi	·	8.6 km	MPC · JPL
74413	1999 AW_{8}	—	January 6, 1999	Xinglong	SCAP	·	6.0 km	MPC · JPL
74414	1999 AN_{9}	—	January 10, 1999	Xinglong	SCAP	·	5.2 km	MPC · JPL
74415	1999 AR_{9}	—	January 10, 1999	Xinglong	SCAP	·	8.8 km	MPC · JPL
74416	1999 AR_{10}	—	January 7, 1999	Kitt Peak	Spacewatch	·	4.8 km	MPC · JPL
74417	1999 AP_{11}	—	January 7, 1999	Kitt Peak	Spacewatch	·	3.2 km	MPC · JPL
74418	1999 AQ_{11}	—	January 7, 1999	Kitt Peak	Spacewatch	·	5.5 km	MPC · JPL
74419	1999 AA_{13}	—	January 7, 1999	Kitt Peak	Spacewatch	HYG	7.7 km	MPC · JPL
74420	1999 AR_{22}	—	January 14, 1999	Xinglong	SCAP	TIR	5.0 km	MPC · JPL
74421 Yogilang	1999 AW_{24}	Yogilang	January 15, 1999	Caussols	ODAS	THM	6.7 km	MPC · JPL
74422	1999 AP_{28}	—	January 13, 1999	Kitt Peak	Spacewatch	·	8.3 km	MPC · JPL
74423	1999 AU_{37}	—	January 10, 1999	Anderson Mesa	LONEOS	·	4.7 km	MPC · JPL
74424	1999 BN	—	January 17, 1999	Modra	L. Kornoš, P. Kolény	·	8.1 km	MPC · JPL
74425	1999 BP	—	January 16, 1999	Višnjan Observatory	Višnjan	·	4.0 km	MPC · JPL
74426	1999 BK_{2}	—	January 19, 1999	Catalina	CSS	H	1.5 km	MPC · JPL
74427	1999 BU_{2}	—	January 18, 1999	Oizumi	T. Kobayashi	H	1.6 km	MPC · JPL
74428	1999 BX_{3}	—	January 20, 1999	Višnjan Observatory	K. Korlević	·	4.6 km	MPC · JPL
74429	1999 BU_{7}	—	January 21, 1999	Višnjan Observatory	K. Korlević	·	3.0 km	MPC · JPL
74430	1999 BN_{10}	—	January 24, 1999	Višnjan Observatory	K. Korlević	·	5.9 km	MPC · JPL
74431	1999 BK_{12}	—	January 24, 1999	Farra d'Isonzo	Farra d'Isonzo	·	4.5 km	MPC · JPL
74432	1999 BM_{12}	—	January 24, 1999	Črni Vrh	Mikuž, H.	·	6.4 km	MPC · JPL
74433	1999 BC_{13}	—	January 24, 1999	Višnjan Observatory	K. Korlević	·	5.2 km	MPC · JPL
74434	1999 BZ_{20}	—	January 16, 1999	Socorro	LINEAR	·	4.3 km	MPC · JPL
74435	1999 BM_{26}	—	January 16, 1999	Kitt Peak	Spacewatch	·	4.0 km	MPC · JPL
74436	1999 BZ_{29}	—	January 18, 1999	Kitt Peak	Spacewatch	·	5.0 km	MPC · JPL
74437	1999 CR	—	February 5, 1999	Oizumi	T. Kobayashi	·	4.1 km	MPC · JPL
74438	1999 CT	—	February 5, 1999	Oizumi	T. Kobayashi	·	4.5 km	MPC · JPL
74439 Brenden	1999 CT_{2}	Brenden	February 6, 1999	Baton Rouge	W. R. Cooney Jr.	·	5.9 km	MPC · JPL
74440	1999 CD_{6}	—	February 10, 1999	Socorro	LINEAR	H	1.5 km	MPC · JPL
74441	1999 CL_{7}	—	February 10, 1999	Socorro	LINEAR	H	1.2 km	MPC · JPL
74442	1999 CJ_{9}	—	February 8, 1999	Uenohara	N. Kawasato	·	6.1 km	MPC · JPL
74443	1999 CY_{11}	—	February 12, 1999	Socorro	LINEAR	H	1.3 km	MPC · JPL
74444	1999 CJ_{12}	—	February 12, 1999	Socorro	LINEAR	H	1.6 km	MPC · JPL
74445	1999 CP_{14}	—	February 15, 1999	Višnjan Observatory	K. Korlević	HYG	7.4 km	MPC · JPL
74446	1999 CT_{19}	—	February 10, 1999	Socorro	LINEAR	·	5.5 km	MPC · JPL
74447	1999 CH_{21}	—	February 10, 1999	Socorro	LINEAR	EOS	5.9 km	MPC · JPL
74448	1999 CL_{21}	—	February 10, 1999	Socorro	LINEAR	·	3.5 km	MPC · JPL
74449	1999 CR_{22}	—	February 10, 1999	Socorro	LINEAR	·	6.3 km	MPC · JPL
74450	1999 CP_{25}	—	February 10, 1999	Socorro	LINEAR	·	4.7 km	MPC · JPL
74451	1999 CZ_{25}	—	February 10, 1999	Socorro	LINEAR	·	5.5 km	MPC · JPL
74452	1999 CL_{27}	—	February 10, 1999	Socorro	LINEAR	·	8.9 km	MPC · JPL
74453	1999 CR_{28}	—	February 10, 1999	Socorro	LINEAR	·	5.1 km	MPC · JPL
74454	1999 CV_{28}	—	February 10, 1999	Socorro	LINEAR	EOS	5.8 km	MPC · JPL
74455	1999 CW_{28}	—	February 10, 1999	Socorro	LINEAR	·	6.4 km	MPC · JPL
74456	1999 CN_{30}	—	February 10, 1999	Socorro	LINEAR	·	9.3 km	MPC · JPL
74457	1999 CC_{31}	—	February 10, 1999	Socorro	LINEAR	EOS	5.8 km	MPC · JPL
74458	1999 CA_{32}	—	February 10, 1999	Socorro	LINEAR	·	8.7 km	MPC · JPL
74459	1999 CQ_{32}	—	February 10, 1999	Socorro	LINEAR	EOS	5.7 km	MPC · JPL
74460	1999 CW_{32}	—	February 10, 1999	Socorro	LINEAR	·	8.4 km	MPC · JPL
74461	1999 CB_{34}	—	February 10, 1999	Socorro	LINEAR	URS	9.4 km	MPC · JPL
74462	1999 CR_{37}	—	February 10, 1999	Socorro	LINEAR	·	4.1 km	MPC · JPL
74463	1999 CW_{37}	—	February 10, 1999	Socorro	LINEAR	THM	5.9 km	MPC · JPL
74464	1999 CA_{38}	—	February 10, 1999	Socorro	LINEAR	·	5.9 km	MPC · JPL
74465	1999 CF_{38}	—	February 10, 1999	Socorro	LINEAR	URS	10 km	MPC · JPL
74466	1999 CS_{41}	—	February 10, 1999	Socorro	LINEAR	DOR	8.4 km	MPC · JPL
74467	1999 CG_{44}	—	February 10, 1999	Socorro	LINEAR	(1118)	11 km	MPC · JPL
74468	1999 CY_{44}	—	February 10, 1999	Socorro	LINEAR	·	4.0 km	MPC · JPL
74469	1999 CN_{52}	—	February 10, 1999	Socorro	LINEAR	·	5.3 km	MPC · JPL
74470	1999 CH_{55}	—	February 10, 1999	Socorro	LINEAR	HYG	9.1 km	MPC · JPL
74471	1999 CT_{55}	—	February 10, 1999	Socorro	LINEAR	EOS	4.1 km	MPC · JPL
74472	1999 CX_{55}	—	February 10, 1999	Socorro	LINEAR	·	5.8 km	MPC · JPL
74473	1999 CY_{55}	—	February 10, 1999	Socorro	LINEAR	BRA	5.0 km	MPC · JPL
74474	1999 CL_{60}	—	February 12, 1999	Socorro	LINEAR	·	7.4 km	MPC · JPL
74475	1999 CM_{63}	—	February 12, 1999	Socorro	LINEAR	·	3.5 km	MPC · JPL
74476	1999 CV_{65}	—	February 12, 1999	Socorro	LINEAR	·	6.7 km	MPC · JPL
74477	1999 CY_{66}	—	February 12, 1999	Socorro	LINEAR	URS	15 km	MPC · JPL
74478	1999 CH_{68}	—	February 12, 1999	Socorro	LINEAR	·	7.3 km	MPC · JPL
74479	1999 CJ_{72}	—	February 12, 1999	Socorro	LINEAR	·	5.3 km	MPC · JPL
74480	1999 CE_{79}	—	February 12, 1999	Socorro	LINEAR	·	6.8 km	MPC · JPL
74481	1999 CL_{83}	—	February 10, 1999	Socorro	LINEAR	fast	7.7 km	MPC · JPL
74482	1999 CO_{92}	—	February 10, 1999	Socorro	LINEAR	·	5.4 km	MPC · JPL
74483	1999 CD_{94}	—	February 10, 1999	Socorro	LINEAR	·	7.0 km	MPC · JPL
74484	1999 CN_{95}	—	February 10, 1999	Socorro	LINEAR	·	7.0 km	MPC · JPL
74485	1999 CJ_{101}	—	February 10, 1999	Socorro	LINEAR	THM	5.5 km	MPC · JPL
74486	1999 CA_{102}	—	February 10, 1999	Socorro	LINEAR	EOS	5.5 km	MPC · JPL
74487	1999 CE_{105}	—	February 12, 1999	Socorro	LINEAR	CYB	17 km	MPC · JPL
74488	1999 CX_{110}	—	February 12, 1999	Socorro	LINEAR	·	11 km	MPC · JPL
74489	1999 CC_{120}	—	February 11, 1999	Socorro	LINEAR	·	5.4 km	MPC · JPL
74490	1999 CS_{120}	—	February 11, 1999	Socorro	LINEAR	TIR	4.8 km	MPC · JPL
74491	1999 CN_{122}	—	February 11, 1999	Socorro	LINEAR	·	4.9 km	MPC · JPL
74492	1999 CP_{122}	—	February 11, 1999	Socorro	LINEAR	·	8.8 km	MPC · JPL
74493	1999 CQ_{122}	—	February 11, 1999	Socorro	LINEAR	·	9.4 km	MPC · JPL
74494	1999 CP_{123}	—	February 11, 1999	Socorro	LINEAR	·	5.5 km	MPC · JPL
74495	1999 CD_{127}	—	February 11, 1999	Socorro	LINEAR	·	4.0 km	MPC · JPL
74496	1999 CO_{136}	—	February 9, 1999	Kitt Peak	Spacewatch	THM	5.5 km	MPC · JPL
74497	1999 CG_{137}	—	February 9, 1999	Kitt Peak	Spacewatch	EOS	4.1 km	MPC · JPL
74498	1999 CM_{138}	—	February 7, 1999	Kitt Peak	Spacewatch	·	3.9 km	MPC · JPL
74499	1999 CH_{141}	—	February 10, 1999	Kitt Peak	Spacewatch	·	5.1 km	MPC · JPL
74500	1999 CQ_{146}	—	February 9, 1999	Kitt Peak	Spacewatch	·	5.0 km	MPC · JPL

== 74501–74600 ==
back to top

Designation			Discovery			Properties		Ref
Permanent	Provisional	Named after	Date	Site	Discoverer(s)	Category	Diam.	Ref
74501	1999 CO_{152}	—	February 12, 1999	Kitt Peak	Spacewatch	·	4.3 km	MPC · JPL
74502	1999 DG_{2}	—	February 19, 1999	Oizumi	T. Kobayashi	EUN	4.7 km	MPC · JPL
74503 Madola	1999 DN_{4}	Madola	February 23, 1999	Val-des-Bois	Bergeron, D.	·	4.5 km	MPC · JPL
74504	1999 DF_{7}	—	February 18, 1999	Anderson Mesa	LONEOS	·	6.1 km	MPC · JPL
74505	1999 EQ	—	March 6, 1999	Kitt Peak	Spacewatch	·	4.5 km	MPC · JPL
74506	1999 EJ_{4}	—	March 12, 1999	Kitt Peak	Spacewatch	·	6.3 km	MPC · JPL
74507	1999 FX	—	March 17, 1999	Caussols	ODAS	HYG	8.2 km	MPC · JPL
74508	1999 FQ_{2}	—	March 16, 1999	Kitt Peak	Spacewatch	·	4.4 km	MPC · JPL
74509 Gillett	1999 FG_{7}	Gillett	March 22, 1999	Fountain Hills	C. W. Juels	THM	4.6 km	MPC · JPL
74510	1999 FF_{8}	—	March 20, 1999	Socorro	LINEAR	H	1.6 km	MPC · JPL
74511	1999 FH_{8}	—	March 20, 1999	Socorro	LINEAR	H	1.6 km	MPC · JPL
74512	1999 FS_{8}	—	March 20, 1999	Socorro	LINEAR	H	1.4 km	MPC · JPL
74513	1999 FS_{10}	—	March 16, 1999	Kitt Peak	Spacewatch	·	4.0 km	MPC · JPL
74514	1999 FG_{16}	—	March 21, 1999	Kitt Peak	Spacewatch	·	5.0 km	MPC · JPL
74515	1999 FL_{28}	—	March 19, 1999	Socorro	LINEAR	EOS	6.9 km	MPC · JPL
74516	1999 FD_{30}	—	March 19, 1999	Socorro	LINEAR	·	5.1 km	MPC · JPL
74517	1999 FU_{31}	—	March 19, 1999	Socorro	LINEAR	·	12 km	MPC · JPL
74518	1999 FU_{33}	—	March 19, 1999	Socorro	LINEAR	·	2.4 km	MPC · JPL
74519	1999 FA_{34}	—	March 19, 1999	Socorro	LINEAR	·	12 km	MPC · JPL
74520	1999 FF_{35}	—	March 19, 1999	Socorro	LINEAR	EOS	5.1 km	MPC · JPL
74521	1999 FF_{36}	—	March 20, 1999	Socorro	LINEAR	·	6.3 km	MPC · JPL
74522	1999 FH_{62}	—	March 22, 1999	Anderson Mesa	LONEOS	·	6.6 km	MPC · JPL
74523	1999 GA_{6}	—	April 7, 1999	Kitt Peak	Spacewatch	·	1.9 km	MPC · JPL
74524	1999 GG_{16}	—	April 9, 1999	Socorro	LINEAR	THM	7.3 km	MPC · JPL
74525	1999 GW_{22}	—	April 6, 1999	Socorro	LINEAR	·	6.6 km	MPC · JPL
74526	1999 GU_{23}	—	April 6, 1999	Socorro	LINEAR	·	6.8 km	MPC · JPL
74527	1999 GZ_{24}	—	April 6, 1999	Socorro	LINEAR	EOS	6.0 km	MPC · JPL
74528	1999 GV_{34}	—	April 6, 1999	Socorro	LINEAR	·	11 km	MPC · JPL
74529	1999 GJ_{35}	—	April 6, 1999	Socorro	LINEAR	·	9.7 km	MPC · JPL
74530	1999 GW_{39}	—	April 12, 1999	Socorro	LINEAR	·	6.0 km	MPC · JPL
74531	1999 GR_{40}	—	April 12, 1999	Socorro	LINEAR	EOS	6.2 km	MPC · JPL
74532	1999 GO_{47}	—	April 6, 1999	Anderson Mesa	LONEOS	·	4.3 km	MPC · JPL
74533	1999 GS_{50}	—	April 10, 1999	Anderson Mesa	LONEOS	·	5.2 km	MPC · JPL
74534	1999 JA	—	May 1, 1999	Woomera	F. B. Zoltowski	·	7.3 km	MPC · JPL
74535	1999 JS_{3}	—	May 10, 1999	Socorro	LINEAR	·	1.4 km	MPC · JPL
74536	1999 JF_{4}	—	May 10, 1999	Socorro	LINEAR	·	2.1 km	MPC · JPL
74537	1999 JQ_{11}	—	May 12, 1999	Socorro	LINEAR	H	1.5 km	MPC · JPL
74538	1999 JS_{12}	—	May 14, 1999	Catalina	CSS	·	10 km	MPC · JPL
74539	1999 JD_{15}	—	May 12, 1999	Socorro	LINEAR	·	2.2 km	MPC · JPL
74540	1999 JG_{22}	—	May 10, 1999	Socorro	LINEAR	·	1.3 km	MPC · JPL
74541	1999 JT_{22}	—	May 10, 1999	Socorro	LINEAR	·	9.0 km	MPC · JPL
74542	1999 JB_{28}	—	May 10, 1999	Socorro	LINEAR	·	1.3 km	MPC · JPL
74543	1999 JT_{36}	—	May 10, 1999	Socorro	LINEAR	·	1.8 km	MPC · JPL
74544	1999 JJ_{55}	—	May 10, 1999	Socorro	LINEAR	·	1.6 km	MPC · JPL
74545	1999 JB_{59}	—	May 10, 1999	Socorro	LINEAR	·	1.9 km	MPC · JPL
74546	1999 JR_{61}	—	May 10, 1999	Socorro	LINEAR	·	2.7 km	MPC · JPL
74547	1999 JE_{63}	—	May 10, 1999	Socorro	LINEAR	·	2.7 km	MPC · JPL
74548	1999 JM_{64}	—	May 10, 1999	Socorro	LINEAR	·	9.5 km	MPC · JPL
74549	1999 JU_{80}	—	May 12, 1999	Socorro	LINEAR	·	4.6 km	MPC · JPL
74550	1999 JC_{82}	—	May 12, 1999	Socorro	LINEAR	·	6.5 km	MPC · JPL
74551	1999 JY_{98}	—	May 12, 1999	Socorro	LINEAR	·	7.6 km	MPC · JPL
74552	1999 JV_{111}	—	May 13, 1999	Socorro	LINEAR	·	1.4 km	MPC · JPL
74553	1999 KR_{1}	—	May 16, 1999	Kitt Peak	Spacewatch	·	10 km	MPC · JPL
74554	1999 LG_{1}	—	June 7, 1999	Socorro	LINEAR	H	1.2 km	MPC · JPL
74555	1999 LV_{1}	—	June 4, 1999	Socorro	LINEAR	H	2.9 km	MPC · JPL
74556	1999 LG_{6}	—	June 11, 1999	Višnjan Observatory	K. Korlević	·	2.0 km	MPC · JPL
74557	1999 LP_{13}	—	June 9, 1999	Socorro	LINEAR	·	2.0 km	MPC · JPL
74558	1999 LT_{13}	—	June 9, 1999	Socorro	LINEAR	·	1.9 km	MPC · JPL
74559	1999 LQ_{14}	—	June 10, 1999	Socorro	LINEAR	·	1.2 km	MPC · JPL
74560	1999 LC_{15}	—	June 12, 1999	Socorro	LINEAR	H	1.1 km	MPC · JPL
74561	1999 LE_{18}	—	June 9, 1999	Socorro	LINEAR	·	2.2 km	MPC · JPL
74562	1999 LD_{25}	—	June 9, 1999	Socorro	LINEAR	·	1.9 km	MPC · JPL
74563	1999 MQ	—	June 20, 1999	Reedy Creek	J. Broughton	·	1.7 km	MPC · JPL
74564	1999 NY_{1}	—	July 12, 1999	Socorro	LINEAR	·	2.0 km	MPC · JPL
74565	1999 NT_{3}	—	July 13, 1999	Socorro	LINEAR	·	1.9 km	MPC · JPL
74566	1999 NE_{5}	—	July 10, 1999	Mallorca	Á. López J., R. Pacheco	·	2.1 km	MPC · JPL
74567	1999 NP_{6}	—	July 13, 1999	Socorro	LINEAR	·	1.3 km	MPC · JPL
74568	1999 NO_{7}	—	July 13, 1999	Socorro	LINEAR	·	2.2 km	MPC · JPL
74569	1999 NR_{7}	—	July 13, 1999	Socorro	LINEAR	·	2.2 km	MPC · JPL
74570	1999 NE_{8}	—	July 13, 1999	Socorro	LINEAR	·	2.3 km	MPC · JPL
74571	1999 NQ_{8}	—	July 13, 1999	Socorro	LINEAR	·	2.1 km	MPC · JPL
74572	1999 NQ_{10}	—	July 13, 1999	Socorro	LINEAR	·	1.5 km	MPC · JPL
74573	1999 NB_{11}	—	July 13, 1999	Socorro	LINEAR	·	1.9 km	MPC · JPL
74574	1999 NZ_{16}	—	July 14, 1999	Socorro	LINEAR	·	1.5 km	MPC · JPL
74575	1999 NV_{18}	—	July 14, 1999	Socorro	LINEAR	V	1.5 km	MPC · JPL
74576	1999 NG_{25}	—	July 14, 1999	Socorro	LINEAR	·	2.0 km	MPC · JPL
74577	1999 NN_{26}	—	July 14, 1999	Socorro	LINEAR	·	2.1 km	MPC · JPL
74578	1999 NF_{28}	—	July 14, 1999	Socorro	LINEAR	PHO	2.9 km	MPC · JPL
74579	1999 NG_{30}	—	July 14, 1999	Socorro	LINEAR	·	1.8 km	MPC · JPL
74580	1999 NE_{36}	—	July 14, 1999	Socorro	LINEAR	·	1.6 km	MPC · JPL
74581	1999 NS_{38}	—	July 14, 1999	Socorro	LINEAR	·	1.3 km	MPC · JPL
74582	1999 NU_{49}	—	July 13, 1999	Socorro	LINEAR	·	1.7 km	MPC · JPL
74583	1999 NF_{50}	—	July 13, 1999	Socorro	LINEAR	·	1.9 km	MPC · JPL
74584	1999 NH_{50}	—	July 13, 1999	Socorro	LINEAR	·	1.4 km	MPC · JPL
74585	1999 NV_{52}	—	July 12, 1999	Socorro	LINEAR	·	2.0 km	MPC · JPL
74586	1999 NG_{63}	—	July 14, 1999	Socorro	LINEAR	NYS	1.4 km	MPC · JPL
74587	1999 ON_{1}	—	July 21, 1999	Prescott	P. G. Comba	·	1.5 km	MPC · JPL
74588	1999 OO_{1}	—	July 19, 1999	Reedy Creek	J. Broughton	·	1.7 km	MPC · JPL
74589	1999 OX_{1}	—	July 16, 1999	Socorro	LINEAR	·	1.8 km	MPC · JPL
74590	1999 OG_{2}	—	July 22, 1999	Socorro	LINEAR	H	2.5 km	MPC · JPL
74591	1999 PS_{1}	—	August 10, 1999	Ametlla de Mar	J. Nomen	·	2.4 km	MPC · JPL
74592	1999 PR_{4}	—	August 15, 1999	Farpoint	G. Hug	·	2.0 km	MPC · JPL
74593	1999 PS_{4}	—	August 15, 1999	Farpoint	G. Hug	·	1.7 km	MPC · JPL
74594	1999 PN_{6}	—	August 7, 1999	Anderson Mesa	LONEOS	·	1.6 km	MPC · JPL
74595	1999 QP	—	August 20, 1999	Farpoint	G. Bell, G. Hug	MAS	1.4 km	MPC · JPL
74596	1999 QQ	—	August 20, 1999	Kleť	Kleť	·	1.4 km	MPC · JPL
74597	1999 RG	—	September 3, 1999	Prescott	P. G. Comba	·	4.5 km	MPC · JPL
74598	1999 RU_{1}	—	September 5, 1999	Višnjan Observatory	K. Korlević	·	1.2 km	MPC · JPL
74599	1999 RF_{3}	—	September 6, 1999	Višnjan Observatory	K. Korlević	·	1.9 km	MPC · JPL
74600	1999 RH_{3}	—	September 2, 1999	Bergisch Gladbach	W. Bickel	·	1.9 km	MPC · JPL

== 74601–74700 ==
back to top

Designation			Discovery			Properties		Ref
Permanent	Provisional	Named after	Date	Site	Discoverer(s)	Category	Diam.	Ref
74601	1999 RK_{3}	—	September 5, 1999	Ondřejov	L. Kotková	·	2.0 km	MPC · JPL
74602	1999 RJ_{4}	—	September 5, 1999	Catalina	CSS	·	1.4 km	MPC · JPL
74603	1999 RL_{6}	—	September 3, 1999	Kitt Peak	Spacewatch	·	2.9 km	MPC · JPL
74604	1999 RU_{11}	—	September 7, 1999	Socorro	LINEAR	·	2.0 km	MPC · JPL
74605	1999 RL_{12}	—	September 7, 1999	Socorro	LINEAR	NYS	2.2 km	MPC · JPL
74606	1999 RR_{12}	—	September 7, 1999	Socorro	LINEAR	·	3.8 km	MPC · JPL
74607	1999 RJ_{14}	—	September 7, 1999	Socorro	LINEAR	·	2.5 km	MPC · JPL
74608	1999 RC_{17}	—	September 7, 1999	Socorro	LINEAR	·	2.0 km	MPC · JPL
74609	1999 RE_{17}	—	September 7, 1999	Socorro	LINEAR	·	2.6 km	MPC · JPL
74610	1999 RJ_{17}	—	September 7, 1999	Socorro	LINEAR	·	3.1 km	MPC · JPL
74611	1999 RK_{17}	—	September 7, 1999	Socorro	LINEAR	·	2.0 km	MPC · JPL
74612	1999 RW_{17}	—	September 7, 1999	Socorro	LINEAR	·	1.6 km	MPC · JPL
74613	1999 RP_{19}	—	September 7, 1999	Socorro	LINEAR	NYS ·	3.3 km	MPC · JPL
74614	1999 RP_{21}	—	September 7, 1999	Socorro	LINEAR	MAS	1.5 km	MPC · JPL
74615	1999 RT_{21}	—	September 7, 1999	Socorro	LINEAR	MAS	1.5 km	MPC · JPL
74616	1999 RJ_{22}	—	September 7, 1999	Socorro	LINEAR	·	2.1 km	MPC · JPL
74617	1999 RP_{23}	—	September 7, 1999	Socorro	LINEAR	·	2.0 km	MPC · JPL
74618	1999 RQ_{23}	—	September 7, 1999	Socorro	LINEAR	·	1.2 km	MPC · JPL
74619	1999 RM_{25}	—	September 7, 1999	Socorro	LINEAR	·	2.1 km	MPC · JPL
74620	1999 RZ_{27}	—	September 8, 1999	Črni Vrh	Mikuž, H.	·	1.6 km	MPC · JPL
74621	1999 RG_{28}	—	September 7, 1999	Anderson Mesa	LONEOS	·	1.3 km	MPC · JPL
74622	1999 RF_{29}	—	September 8, 1999	Socorro	LINEAR	·	2.3 km	MPC · JPL
74623	1999 RX_{29}	—	September 8, 1999	Socorro	LINEAR	PHO	3.1 km	MPC · JPL
74624	1999 RS_{32}	—	September 10, 1999	Ametlla de Mar	J. Nomen	·	1.6 km	MPC · JPL
74625 Tieproject	1999 RR_{34}	Tieproject	September 10, 1999	Campo Catino	G. Masi, F. Mallia	·	1.8 km	MPC · JPL
74626	1999 RW_{38}	—	September 12, 1999	Reedy Creek	J. Broughton	·	2.2 km	MPC · JPL
74627	1999 RP_{42}	—	September 14, 1999	Višnjan Observatory	K. Korlević	·	2.9 km	MPC · JPL
74628	1999 RV_{42}	—	September 12, 1999	Črni Vrh	Mikuž, H.	·	2.2 km	MPC · JPL
74629	1999 RB_{45}	—	September 11, 1999	Saint-Michel-sur-Meurthe	L. Bernasconi	NYS	1.5 km	MPC · JPL
74630	1999 RD_{46}	—	September 7, 1999	Socorro	LINEAR	·	1.9 km	MPC · JPL
74631	1999 RS_{46}	—	September 7, 1999	Socorro	LINEAR	·	1.4 km	MPC · JPL
74632	1999 RQ_{47}	—	September 7, 1999	Socorro	LINEAR	·	1.7 km	MPC · JPL
74633	1999 RC_{48}	—	September 7, 1999	Socorro	LINEAR	·	2.2 km	MPC · JPL
74634	1999 RJ_{50}	—	September 7, 1999	Socorro	LINEAR	·	1.5 km	MPC · JPL
74635	1999 RR_{51}	—	September 7, 1999	Socorro	LINEAR	·	1.5 km	MPC · JPL
74636	1999 RK_{52}	—	September 7, 1999	Socorro	LINEAR	NYS	1.6 km	MPC · JPL
74637	1999 RS_{56}	—	September 7, 1999	Socorro	LINEAR	·	2.2 km	MPC · JPL
74638	1999 RV_{57}	—	September 7, 1999	Socorro	LINEAR	MAS	1.4 km	MPC · JPL
74639	1999 RF_{59}	—	September 7, 1999	Socorro	LINEAR	·	1.8 km	MPC · JPL
74640	1999 RW_{59}	—	September 7, 1999	Socorro	LINEAR	·	2.0 km	MPC · JPL
74641	1999 RX_{60}	—	September 7, 1999	Socorro	LINEAR	·	2.1 km	MPC · JPL
74642	1999 RJ_{61}	—	September 7, 1999	Socorro	LINEAR	·	1.5 km	MPC · JPL
74643	1999 RJ_{62}	—	September 7, 1999	Socorro	LINEAR	NYS	2.6 km	MPC · JPL
74644	1999 RK_{63}	—	September 7, 1999	Socorro	LINEAR	·	2.5 km	MPC · JPL
74645	1999 RW_{67}	—	September 7, 1999	Socorro	LINEAR	NYS	2.0 km	MPC · JPL
74646	1999 RD_{70}	—	September 7, 1999	Socorro	LINEAR	·	1.7 km	MPC · JPL
74647	1999 RH_{71}	—	September 7, 1999	Socorro	LINEAR	MAS	1.5 km	MPC · JPL
74648	1999 RM_{72}	—	September 7, 1999	Socorro	LINEAR	·	1.5 km	MPC · JPL
74649	1999 RF_{73}	—	September 7, 1999	Socorro	LINEAR	fast	1.5 km	MPC · JPL
74650	1999 RS_{79}	—	September 7, 1999	Socorro	LINEAR	·	2.1 km	MPC · JPL
74651	1999 RU_{82}	—	September 7, 1999	Socorro	LINEAR	·	1.8 km	MPC · JPL
74652	1999 RE_{85}	—	September 7, 1999	Socorro	LINEAR	·	1.9 km	MPC · JPL
74653	1999 RJ_{85}	—	September 7, 1999	Socorro	LINEAR	NYS	2.5 km	MPC · JPL
74654	1999 RU_{85}	—	September 7, 1999	Socorro	LINEAR	·	2.6 km	MPC · JPL
74655	1999 RG_{87}	—	September 7, 1999	Socorro	LINEAR	NYS	2.1 km	MPC · JPL
74656	1999 RR_{87}	—	September 7, 1999	Socorro	LINEAR	·	2.7 km	MPC · JPL
74657	1999 RG_{88}	—	September 7, 1999	Socorro	LINEAR	·	1.7 km	MPC · JPL
74658	1999 RT_{89}	—	September 7, 1999	Socorro	LINEAR	NYS	1.3 km	MPC · JPL
74659	1999 RU_{89}	—	September 7, 1999	Socorro	LINEAR	·	1.7 km	MPC · JPL
74660	1999 RG_{90}	—	September 7, 1999	Socorro	LINEAR	·	6.2 km	MPC · JPL
74661	1999 RN_{90}	—	September 7, 1999	Socorro	LINEAR	·	1.6 km	MPC · JPL
74662	1999 RH_{93}	—	September 7, 1999	Socorro	LINEAR	(5)	2.6 km	MPC · JPL
74663	1999 RK_{93}	—	September 7, 1999	Socorro	LINEAR	·	2.3 km	MPC · JPL
74664	1999 RW_{93}	—	September 7, 1999	Socorro	LINEAR	V	1.3 km	MPC · JPL
74665	1999 RA_{94}	—	September 7, 1999	Socorro	LINEAR	·	2.5 km	MPC · JPL
74666	1999 RQ_{95}	—	September 7, 1999	Socorro	LINEAR	·	2.0 km	MPC · JPL
74667	1999 RR_{95}	—	September 7, 1999	Socorro	LINEAR	NYS	1.9 km	MPC · JPL
74668	1999 RJ_{96}	—	September 7, 1999	Socorro	LINEAR	MAS	1.4 km	MPC · JPL
74669	1999 RN_{96}	—	September 7, 1999	Socorro	LINEAR	MAS	1.5 km	MPC · JPL
74670	1999 RO_{100}	—	September 8, 1999	Socorro	LINEAR	·	1.7 km	MPC · JPL
74671	1999 RT_{104}	—	September 8, 1999	Socorro	LINEAR	V	1.2 km	MPC · JPL
74672	1999 RY_{104}	—	September 8, 1999	Socorro	LINEAR	·	2.0 km	MPC · JPL
74673	1999 RG_{105}	—	September 8, 1999	Socorro	LINEAR	·	1.8 km	MPC · JPL
74674	1999 RJ_{105}	—	September 8, 1999	Socorro	LINEAR	·	2.0 km	MPC · JPL
74675	1999 RN_{109}	—	September 8, 1999	Socorro	LINEAR	V	1.5 km	MPC · JPL
74676	1999 RR_{110}	—	September 8, 1999	Socorro	LINEAR	V	1.4 km	MPC · JPL
74677	1999 RM_{111}	—	September 9, 1999	Socorro	LINEAR	·	2.1 km	MPC · JPL
74678	1999 RM_{112}	—	September 9, 1999	Socorro	LINEAR	·	1.9 km	MPC · JPL
74679	1999 RJ_{114}	—	September 9, 1999	Socorro	LINEAR	·	2.1 km	MPC · JPL
74680	1999 RW_{115}	—	September 9, 1999	Socorro	LINEAR	·	2.3 km	MPC · JPL
74681	1999 RX_{115}	—	September 9, 1999	Socorro	LINEAR	·	3.3 km	MPC · JPL
74682	1999 RL_{117}	—	September 9, 1999	Socorro	LINEAR	V	1.2 km	MPC · JPL
74683	1999 RC_{122}	—	September 9, 1999	Socorro	LINEAR	V	1.3 km	MPC · JPL
74684	1999 RG_{123}	—	September 9, 1999	Socorro	LINEAR	V	2.1 km	MPC · JPL
74685	1999 RT_{123}	—	September 9, 1999	Socorro	LINEAR	·	2.2 km	MPC · JPL
74686	1999 RF_{125}	—	September 9, 1999	Socorro	LINEAR	·	1.9 km	MPC · JPL
74687	1999 RA_{126}	—	September 9, 1999	Socorro	LINEAR	·	1.9 km	MPC · JPL
74688	1999 RW_{128}	—	September 9, 1999	Socorro	LINEAR	·	2.4 km	MPC · JPL
74689	1999 RB_{130}	—	September 9, 1999	Socorro	LINEAR	·	1.6 km	MPC · JPL
74690	1999 RF_{130}	—	September 9, 1999	Socorro	LINEAR	·	2.1 km	MPC · JPL
74691	1999 RV_{132}	—	September 9, 1999	Socorro	LINEAR	·	1.9 km	MPC · JPL
74692	1999 RF_{134}	—	September 9, 1999	Socorro	LINEAR	V	1.6 km	MPC · JPL
74693	1999 RG_{136}	—	September 9, 1999	Socorro	LINEAR	·	1.7 km	MPC · JPL
74694	1999 RU_{136}	—	September 9, 1999	Socorro	LINEAR	·	2.3 km	MPC · JPL
74695	1999 RA_{139}	—	September 9, 1999	Socorro	LINEAR	·	1.6 km	MPC · JPL
74696	1999 RR_{141}	—	September 9, 1999	Socorro	LINEAR	·	2.1 km	MPC · JPL
74697	1999 RZ_{141}	—	September 9, 1999	Socorro	LINEAR	·	2.9 km	MPC · JPL
74698	1999 RZ_{142}	—	September 9, 1999	Socorro	LINEAR	·	1.7 km	MPC · JPL
74699	1999 RG_{144}	—	September 9, 1999	Socorro	LINEAR	V	1.3 km	MPC · JPL
74700	1999 RH_{145}	—	September 9, 1999	Socorro	LINEAR	·	2.7 km	MPC · JPL

== 74701–74800 ==
back to top

Designation			Discovery			Properties		Ref
Permanent	Provisional	Named after	Date	Site	Discoverer(s)	Category	Diam.	Ref
74701	1999 RT_{145}	—	September 9, 1999	Socorro	LINEAR	·	2.1 km	MPC · JPL
74702	1999 RQ_{146}	—	September 9, 1999	Socorro	LINEAR	·	2.1 km	MPC · JPL
74703	1999 RN_{148}	—	September 9, 1999	Socorro	LINEAR	NYS ·	3.3 km	MPC · JPL
74704	1999 RU_{148}	—	September 9, 1999	Socorro	LINEAR	·	1.6 km	MPC · JPL
74705	1999 RX_{148}	—	September 9, 1999	Socorro	LINEAR	·	3.1 km	MPC · JPL
74706	1999 RE_{150}	—	September 9, 1999	Socorro	LINEAR	·	1.8 km	MPC · JPL
74707	1999 RO_{150}	—	September 9, 1999	Socorro	LINEAR	·	1.6 km	MPC · JPL
74708	1999 RW_{150}	—	September 9, 1999	Socorro	LINEAR	·	1.9 km	MPC · JPL
74709	1999 RU_{151}	—	September 9, 1999	Socorro	LINEAR	·	1.6 km	MPC · JPL
74710	1999 RH_{153}	—	September 9, 1999	Socorro	LINEAR	·	1.9 km	MPC · JPL
74711	1999 RL_{155}	—	September 9, 1999	Socorro	LINEAR	·	2.0 km	MPC · JPL
74712	1999 RT_{155}	—	September 9, 1999	Socorro	LINEAR	·	1.8 km	MPC · JPL
74713	1999 RO_{156}	—	September 9, 1999	Socorro	LINEAR	·	1.5 km	MPC · JPL
74714	1999 RP_{157}	—	September 9, 1999	Socorro	LINEAR	V	1.3 km	MPC · JPL
74715	1999 RU_{160}	—	September 9, 1999	Socorro	LINEAR	·	2.5 km	MPC · JPL
74716	1999 RO_{164}	—	September 9, 1999	Socorro	LINEAR	·	2.4 km	MPC · JPL
74717	1999 RF_{165}	—	September 9, 1999	Socorro	LINEAR	·	1.8 km	MPC · JPL
74718	1999 RX_{165}	—	September 9, 1999	Socorro	LINEAR	·	2.0 km	MPC · JPL
74719	1999 RT_{166}	—	September 9, 1999	Socorro	LINEAR	·	2.2 km	MPC · JPL
74720	1999 RA_{167}	—	September 9, 1999	Socorro	LINEAR	·	1.7 km	MPC · JPL
74721	1999 RH_{167}	—	September 9, 1999	Socorro	LINEAR	·	2.1 km	MPC · JPL
74722	1999 RB_{168}	—	September 9, 1999	Socorro	LINEAR	·	2.1 km	MPC · JPL
74723	1999 RU_{168}	—	September 9, 1999	Socorro	LINEAR	·	2.6 km	MPC · JPL
74724	1999 RF_{169}	—	September 9, 1999	Socorro	LINEAR	·	1.9 km	MPC · JPL
74725	1999 RT_{169}	—	September 9, 1999	Socorro	LINEAR	·	1.7 km	MPC · JPL
74726	1999 RW_{169}	—	September 9, 1999	Socorro	LINEAR	·	1.9 km	MPC · JPL
74727	1999 RJ_{170}	—	September 9, 1999	Socorro	LINEAR	NYS ·	3.1 km	MPC · JPL
74728	1999 RY_{174}	—	September 9, 1999	Socorro	LINEAR	·	2.2 km	MPC · JPL
74729	1999 RH_{175}	—	September 9, 1999	Socorro	LINEAR	·	2.2 km	MPC · JPL
74730	1999 RU_{175}	—	September 9, 1999	Socorro	LINEAR	NYS ·	4.1 km	MPC · JPL
74731	1999 RM_{176}	—	September 9, 1999	Socorro	LINEAR	·	2.0 km	MPC · JPL
74732	1999 RQ_{176}	—	September 9, 1999	Socorro	LINEAR	·	2.1 km	MPC · JPL
74733	1999 RV_{178}	—	September 9, 1999	Socorro	LINEAR	NYS	2.0 km	MPC · JPL
74734	1999 RY_{179}	—	September 9, 1999	Socorro	LINEAR	·	3.6 km	MPC · JPL
74735	1999 RB_{180}	—	September 9, 1999	Socorro	LINEAR	·	1.7 km	MPC · JPL
74736	1999 RD_{180}	—	September 9, 1999	Socorro	LINEAR	V	1.6 km	MPC · JPL
74737	1999 RK_{180}	—	September 9, 1999	Socorro	LINEAR	·	2.1 km	MPC · JPL
74738	1999 RE_{182}	—	September 9, 1999	Socorro	LINEAR	·	1.9 km	MPC · JPL
74739	1999 RG_{184}	—	September 9, 1999	Socorro	LINEAR	·	1.5 km	MPC · JPL
74740	1999 RN_{184}	—	September 9, 1999	Socorro	LINEAR	·	3.2 km	MPC · JPL
74741	1999 RP_{184}	—	September 9, 1999	Socorro	LINEAR	NYS ·	2.8 km	MPC · JPL
74742	1999 RK_{187}	—	September 9, 1999	Socorro	LINEAR	PHO	1.8 km	MPC · JPL
74743	1999 RH_{188}	—	September 9, 1999	Socorro	LINEAR	·	1.5 km	MPC · JPL
74744	1999 RX_{189}	—	September 9, 1999	Socorro	LINEAR	·	1.4 km	MPC · JPL
74745	1999 RZ_{191}	—	September 11, 1999	Socorro	LINEAR	·	5.1 km	MPC · JPL
74746	1999 RK_{192}	—	September 15, 1999	Kitt Peak	Spacewatch	·	3.2 km	MPC · JPL
74747	1999 RB_{193}	—	September 13, 1999	Socorro	LINEAR	·	2.4 km	MPC · JPL
74748	1999 RW_{193}	—	September 7, 1999	Socorro	LINEAR	·	2.3 km	MPC · JPL
74749	1999 RK_{195}	—	September 8, 1999	Socorro	LINEAR	PHO	5.6 km	MPC · JPL
74750	1999 RA_{196}	—	September 8, 1999	Socorro	LINEAR	·	2.4 km	MPC · JPL
74751	1999 RF_{197}	—	September 8, 1999	Socorro	LINEAR	·	2.3 km	MPC · JPL
74752	1999 RN_{197}	—	September 8, 1999	Socorro	LINEAR	EUN	2.5 km	MPC · JPL
74753	1999 RV_{197}	—	September 8, 1999	Socorro	LINEAR	·	2.3 km	MPC · JPL
74754	1999 RO_{198}	—	September 9, 1999	Socorro	LINEAR	·	1.6 km	MPC · JPL
74755	1999 RL_{199}	—	September 8, 1999	Socorro	LINEAR	·	3.9 km	MPC · JPL
74756	1999 RN_{199}	—	September 8, 1999	Socorro	LINEAR	·	2.8 km	MPC · JPL
74757	1999 RZ_{205}	—	September 8, 1999	Socorro	LINEAR	·	2.5 km	MPC · JPL
74758	1999 RP_{207}	—	September 8, 1999	Socorro	LINEAR	·	1.8 km	MPC · JPL
74759	1999 RA_{210}	—	September 8, 1999	Socorro	LINEAR	·	2.1 km	MPC · JPL
74760	1999 RY_{210}	—	September 8, 1999	Socorro	LINEAR	V	1.5 km	MPC · JPL
74761	1999 RA_{211}	—	September 8, 1999	Socorro	LINEAR	·	3.5 km	MPC · JPL
74762	1999 RC_{212}	—	September 8, 1999	Socorro	LINEAR	·	1.9 km	MPC · JPL
74763	1999 RU_{212}	—	September 8, 1999	Socorro	LINEAR	·	2.8 km	MPC · JPL
74764 Rudolfpešek	1999 RP_{213}	Rudolfpešek	September 15, 1999	Ondřejov	P. Kušnirák, P. Pravec	·	2.5 km	MPC · JPL
74765	1999 RF_{216}	—	September 4, 1999	Anderson Mesa	LONEOS	NYS	1.4 km	MPC · JPL
74766	1999 RX_{217}	—	September 4, 1999	Anderson Mesa	LONEOS	·	1.8 km	MPC · JPL
74767	1999 RH_{221}	—	September 5, 1999	Anderson Mesa	LONEOS	·	1.5 km	MPC · JPL
74768	1999 RJ_{222}	—	September 7, 1999	Anderson Mesa	LONEOS	·	1.7 km	MPC · JPL
74769	1999 RK_{222}	—	September 7, 1999	Anderson Mesa	LONEOS	·	1.4 km	MPC · JPL
74770	1999 RY_{222}	—	September 7, 1999	Catalina	CSS	·	1.5 km	MPC · JPL
74771	1999 RX_{224}	—	September 7, 1999	Socorro	LINEAR	·	1.8 km	MPC · JPL
74772	1999 RT_{229}	—	September 8, 1999	Catalina	CSS	·	3.5 km	MPC · JPL
74773	1999 RX_{235}	—	September 8, 1999	Catalina	CSS	·	1.9 km	MPC · JPL
74774	1999 RM_{236}	—	September 8, 1999	Catalina	CSS	·	2.5 km	MPC · JPL
74775	1999 RB_{237}	—	September 8, 1999	Catalina	CSS	·	2.3 km	MPC · JPL
74776	1999 RJ_{237}	—	September 8, 1999	Catalina	CSS	(2076)	1.8 km	MPC · JPL
74777	1999 RA_{239}	—	September 8, 1999	Socorro	LINEAR	·	2.7 km	MPC · JPL
74778	1999 RR_{239}	—	September 8, 1999	Anderson Mesa	LONEOS	·	1.9 km	MPC · JPL
74779	1999 RF_{241}	—	September 11, 1999	Socorro	LINEAR	·	2.8 km	MPC · JPL
74780	1999 RL_{241}	—	September 14, 1999	Catalina	CSS	·	1.7 km	MPC · JPL
74781	1999 RY_{245}	—	September 7, 1999	Anderson Mesa	LONEOS	·	2.6 km	MPC · JPL
74782	1999 RQ_{246}	—	September 7, 1999	Anderson Mesa	LONEOS	·	2.6 km	MPC · JPL
74783	1999 RA_{250}	—	September 7, 1999	Kitt Peak	Spacewatch	·	2.2 km	MPC · JPL
74784	1999 RH_{250}	—	September 7, 1999	Socorro	LINEAR	·	2.3 km	MPC · JPL
74785	1999 RE_{255}	—	September 6, 1999	Catalina	CSS	V	1.6 km	MPC · JPL
74786	1999 SY	—	September 16, 1999	Kitt Peak	Spacewatch	NYS	2.7 km	MPC · JPL
74787	1999 SH_{2}	—	September 22, 1999	Višnjan Observatory	K. Korlević	NYS	3.2 km	MPC · JPL
74788	1999 SL_{3}	—	September 22, 1999	Socorro	LINEAR	PHO	2.6 km	MPC · JPL
74789	1999 SY_{5}	—	September 30, 1999	Socorro	LINEAR	·	5.1 km	MPC · JPL
74790	1999 SP_{6}	—	September 30, 1999	Socorro	LINEAR	·	2.0 km	MPC · JPL
74791	1999 SW_{6}	—	September 30, 1999	Zeno	T. Stafford	NYS	2.7 km	MPC · JPL
74792	1999 SS_{9}	—	September 29, 1999	Višnjan Observatory	K. Korlević	·	3.0 km	MPC · JPL
74793	1999 SR_{10}	—	September 29, 1999	Xinglong	SCAP	·	2.1 km	MPC · JPL
74794	1999 SE_{12}	—	September 22, 1999	Socorro	LINEAR	PHO	2.6 km	MPC · JPL
74795	1999 SG_{14}	—	September 29, 1999	Catalina	CSS	·	2.4 km	MPC · JPL
74796	1999 SH_{14}	—	September 29, 1999	Catalina	CSS	·	1.9 km	MPC · JPL
74797	1999 SM_{15}	—	September 30, 1999	Catalina	CSS	·	2.2 km	MPC · JPL
74798	1999 SN_{15}	—	September 30, 1999	Catalina	CSS	·	3.1 km	MPC · JPL
74799	1999 SC_{18}	—	September 30, 1999	Socorro	LINEAR	(2076)	1.5 km	MPC · JPL
74800	1999 SK_{18}	—	September 30, 1999	Socorro	LINEAR	·	1.7 km	MPC · JPL

== 74801–74900 ==
back to top

Designation			Discovery			Properties		Ref
Permanent	Provisional	Named after	Date	Site	Discoverer(s)	Category	Diam.	Ref
74801	1999 SN_{18}	—	September 30, 1999	Socorro	LINEAR	·	2.5 km	MPC · JPL
74802	1999 SX_{19}	—	September 30, 1999	Socorro	LINEAR	·	1.9 km	MPC · JPL
74803	1999 SE_{22}	—	September 21, 1999	Anderson Mesa	LONEOS	·	3.3 km	MPC · JPL
74804	1999 SZ_{26}	—	September 30, 1999	Kitt Peak	Spacewatch	V	1.3 km	MPC · JPL
74805	1999 TF	—	October 2, 1999	Kleť	Kleť	·	2.4 km	MPC · JPL
74806	1999 TT	—	October 1, 1999	Višnjan Observatory	K. Korlević	V	1.7 km	MPC · JPL
74807	1999 TV	—	October 1, 1999	Višnjan Observatory	K. Korlević	·	1.8 km	MPC · JPL
74808	1999 TW_{1}	—	October 1, 1999	Višnjan Observatory	K. Korlević	·	3.6 km	MPC · JPL
74809	1999 TE_{2}	—	October 2, 1999	Fountain Hills	C. W. Juels	·	2.1 km	MPC · JPL
74810	1999 TS_{4}	—	October 4, 1999	Socorro	LINEAR	PHO	2.6 km	MPC · JPL
74811	1999 TH_{5}	—	October 1, 1999	Farpoint	G. Hug	·	3.7 km	MPC · JPL
74812	1999 TN_{5}	—	October 1, 1999	Višnjan Observatory	K. Korlević, M. Jurić	·	2.1 km	MPC · JPL
74813	1999 TB_{7}	—	October 6, 1999	Višnjan Observatory	K. Korlević, M. Jurić	·	3.6 km	MPC · JPL
74814	1999 TD_{8}	—	October 5, 1999	Fountain Hills	C. W. Juels	·	2.3 km	MPC · JPL
74815	1999 TG_{8}	—	October 7, 1999	Fountain Hills	C. W. Juels	·	3.1 km	MPC · JPL
74816	1999 TX_{8}	—	October 1, 1999	Farra d'Isonzo	Farra d'Isonzo	NYS	1.2 km	MPC · JPL
74817	1999 TZ_{8}	—	October 6, 1999	Farra d'Isonzo	Farra d'Isonzo	·	2.1 km	MPC · JPL
74818 Iten	1999 TW_{10}	Iten	October 7, 1999	Gnosca	S. Sposetti	·	2.3 km	MPC · JPL
74819	1999 TG_{11}	—	October 9, 1999	Fountain Hills	C. W. Juels	·	5.9 km	MPC · JPL
74820	1999 TN_{11}	—	October 7, 1999	Siding Spring	R. H. McNaught	·	3.2 km	MPC · JPL
74821	1999 TP_{13}	—	October 10, 1999	Črni Vrh	Mikuž, H.	·	2.0 km	MPC · JPL
74822	1999 TA_{15}	—	October 12, 1999	Fountain Hills	C. W. Juels	V	1.6 km	MPC · JPL
74823	1999 TD_{15}	—	October 10, 1999	Gekko	T. Kagawa	·	2.4 km	MPC · JPL
74824 Tarter	1999 TJ_{16}	Tarter	October 12, 1999	Fountain Hills	C. W. Juels	NYS ·	4.1 km	MPC · JPL
74825	1999 TE_{17}	—	October 15, 1999	Višnjan Observatory	K. Korlević	V	1.4 km	MPC · JPL
74826	1999 TN_{17}	—	October 13, 1999	Modra	A. Galád, P. Kolény	·	2.2 km	MPC · JPL
74827	1999 TW_{17}	—	October 4, 1999	Xinglong	SCAP	NYS	2.3 km	MPC · JPL
74828	1999 TB_{21}	—	October 7, 1999	Goodricke-Pigott	R. A. Tucker	·	2.0 km	MPC · JPL
74829	1999 TR_{21}	—	October 2, 1999	Kitt Peak	Spacewatch	V	1.1 km	MPC · JPL
74830	1999 TX_{22}	—	October 3, 1999	Kitt Peak	Spacewatch	NYS	2.5 km	MPC · JPL
74831	1999 TU_{25}	—	October 3, 1999	Socorro	LINEAR	MAS	1.2 km	MPC · JPL
74832	1999 TH_{26}	—	October 3, 1999	Socorro	LINEAR	slow	5.1 km	MPC · JPL
74833	1999 TZ_{26}	—	October 3, 1999	Socorro	LINEAR	·	3.0 km	MPC · JPL
74834	1999 TN_{30}	—	October 4, 1999	Socorro	LINEAR	·	1.9 km	MPC · JPL
74835	1999 TW_{30}	—	October 4, 1999	Socorro	LINEAR	·	2.1 km	MPC · JPL
74836	1999 TS_{31}	—	October 4, 1999	Socorro	LINEAR	·	2.3 km	MPC · JPL
74837	1999 TD_{33}	—	October 4, 1999	Socorro	LINEAR	NYS ·	3.3 km	MPC · JPL
74838	1999 TK_{34}	—	October 3, 1999	Catalina	CSS	·	2.6 km	MPC · JPL
74839	1999 TZ_{34}	—	October 3, 1999	Socorro	LINEAR	·	2.9 km	MPC · JPL
74840	1999 TW_{35}	—	October 6, 1999	Socorro	LINEAR	·	1.7 km	MPC · JPL
74841	1999 TH_{36}	—	October 11, 1999	Anderson Mesa	LONEOS	·	3.0 km	MPC · JPL
74842	1999 TS_{38}	—	October 1, 1999	Catalina	CSS	·	3.2 km	MPC · JPL
74843	1999 TB_{39}	—	October 3, 1999	Catalina	CSS	·	3.1 km	MPC · JPL
74844	1999 TV_{39}	—	October 3, 1999	Catalina	CSS	·	3.8 km	MPC · JPL
74845	1999 TP_{40}	—	October 5, 1999	Catalina	CSS	·	2.2 km	MPC · JPL
74846	1999 TO_{41}	—	October 2, 1999	Kitt Peak	Spacewatch	·	2.6 km	MPC · JPL
74847	1999 TE_{49}	—	October 4, 1999	Kitt Peak	Spacewatch	·	1.6 km	MPC · JPL
74848	1999 TS_{49}	—	October 4, 1999	Kitt Peak	Spacewatch	V · slow	1.5 km	MPC · JPL
74849	1999 TP_{51}	—	October 4, 1999	Kitt Peak	Spacewatch	·	1.4 km	MPC · JPL
74850	1999 TO_{63}	—	October 7, 1999	Kitt Peak	Spacewatch	MAS	1.8 km	MPC · JPL
74851	1999 TL_{65}	—	October 8, 1999	Kitt Peak	Spacewatch	NYS	1.9 km	MPC · JPL
74852	1999 TV_{65}	—	October 8, 1999	Kitt Peak	Spacewatch	·	3.4 km	MPC · JPL
74853	1999 TW_{73}	—	October 10, 1999	Kitt Peak	Spacewatch	NYS	1.7 km	MPC · JPL
74854	1999 TT_{78}	—	October 11, 1999	Kitt Peak	Spacewatch	MAS	1.6 km	MPC · JPL
74855	1999 TR_{87}	—	October 15, 1999	Kitt Peak	Spacewatch	V	1.3 km	MPC · JPL
74856	1999 TN_{88}	—	October 2, 1999	Socorro	LINEAR	NYS	2.0 km	MPC · JPL
74857	1999 TT_{88}	—	October 2, 1999	Socorro	LINEAR	·	2.4 km	MPC · JPL
74858	1999 TU_{88}	—	October 2, 1999	Socorro	LINEAR	·	1.8 km	MPC · JPL
74859	1999 TW_{89}	—	October 2, 1999	Socorro	LINEAR	·	1.8 km	MPC · JPL
74860	1999 TZ_{89}	—	October 2, 1999	Socorro	LINEAR	·	2.7 km	MPC · JPL
74861	1999 TW_{90}	—	October 2, 1999	Socorro	LINEAR	·	2.0 km	MPC · JPL
74862	1999 TB_{91}	—	October 2, 1999	Socorro	LINEAR	fast	1.6 km	MPC · JPL
74863	1999 TC_{91}	—	October 2, 1999	Socorro	LINEAR	·	2.1 km	MPC · JPL
74864	1999 TF_{91}	—	October 2, 1999	Socorro	LINEAR	·	2.2 km	MPC · JPL
74865	1999 TG_{91}	—	October 2, 1999	Socorro	LINEAR	·	1.9 km	MPC · JPL
74866	1999 TA_{93}	—	October 2, 1999	Socorro	LINEAR	·	2.0 km	MPC · JPL
74867	1999 TB_{93}	—	October 2, 1999	Socorro	LINEAR	·	1.7 km	MPC · JPL
74868	1999 TC_{93}	—	October 2, 1999	Socorro	LINEAR	·	2.1 km	MPC · JPL
74869	1999 TN_{94}	—	October 2, 1999	Socorro	LINEAR	·	3.1 km	MPC · JPL
74870	1999 TJ_{96}	—	October 2, 1999	Socorro	LINEAR	·	3.1 km	MPC · JPL
74871	1999 TT_{97}	—	October 2, 1999	Socorro	LINEAR	·	1.6 km	MPC · JPL
74872	1999 TC_{98}	—	October 2, 1999	Socorro	LINEAR	V	1.6 km	MPC · JPL
74873	1999 TO_{98}	—	October 2, 1999	Socorro	LINEAR	(2076)	1.8 km	MPC · JPL
74874	1999 TA_{99}	—	October 2, 1999	Socorro	LINEAR	V	2.2 km	MPC · JPL
74875	1999 TH_{100}	—	October 2, 1999	Socorro	LINEAR	·	2.1 km	MPC · JPL
74876	1999 TN_{103}	—	October 3, 1999	Socorro	LINEAR	·	2.2 km	MPC · JPL
74877	1999 TU_{103}	—	October 3, 1999	Socorro	LINEAR	·	1.9 km	MPC · JPL
74878	1999 TK_{104}	—	October 3, 1999	Socorro	LINEAR	·	2.2 km	MPC · JPL
74879	1999 TP_{104}	—	October 3, 1999	Socorro	LINEAR	·	2.0 km	MPC · JPL
74880	1999 TY_{104}	—	October 3, 1999	Socorro	LINEAR	·	2.5 km	MPC · JPL
74881	1999 TE_{105}	—	October 3, 1999	Socorro	LINEAR	·	2.9 km	MPC · JPL
74882	1999 TV_{105}	—	October 3, 1999	Socorro	LINEAR	·	3.2 km	MPC · JPL
74883	1999 TC_{108}	—	October 4, 1999	Socorro	LINEAR	V	1.5 km	MPC · JPL
74884	1999 TM_{109}	—	October 4, 1999	Socorro	LINEAR	·	2.6 km	MPC · JPL
74885	1999 TY_{110}	—	October 4, 1999	Socorro	LINEAR	V	1.6 km	MPC · JPL
74886	1999 TA_{113}	—	October 4, 1999	Socorro	LINEAR	·	2.0 km	MPC · JPL
74887	1999 TE_{113}	—	October 4, 1999	Socorro	LINEAR	·	1.6 km	MPC · JPL
74888	1999 TG_{115}	—	October 4, 1999	Socorro	LINEAR	·	3.9 km	MPC · JPL
74889	1999 TU_{116}	—	October 4, 1999	Socorro	LINEAR	·	2.3 km	MPC · JPL
74890	1999 TW_{116}	—	October 4, 1999	Socorro	LINEAR	·	3.0 km	MPC · JPL
74891	1999 TZ_{116}	—	October 4, 1999	Socorro	LINEAR	(5)	2.0 km	MPC · JPL
74892	1999 TQ_{118}	—	October 4, 1999	Socorro	LINEAR	·	2.1 km	MPC · JPL
74893	1999 TX_{118}	—	October 4, 1999	Socorro	LINEAR	·	1.7 km	MPC · JPL
74894	1999 TB_{119}	—	October 4, 1999	Socorro	LINEAR	·	1.9 km	MPC · JPL
74895	1999 TL_{120}	—	October 4, 1999	Socorro	LINEAR	·	1.5 km	MPC · JPL
74896	1999 TO_{121}	—	October 4, 1999	Socorro	LINEAR	·	2.5 km	MPC · JPL
74897	1999 TN_{122}	—	October 4, 1999	Socorro	LINEAR	·	3.6 km	MPC · JPL
74898	1999 TL_{123}	—	October 4, 1999	Socorro	LINEAR	V	2.1 km	MPC · JPL
74899	1999 TQ_{123}	—	October 4, 1999	Socorro	LINEAR	·	1.9 km	MPC · JPL
74900	1999 TO_{124}	—	October 4, 1999	Socorro	LINEAR	·	2.3 km	MPC · JPL

== 74901–75000 ==
back to top

Designation			Discovery			Properties		Ref
Permanent	Provisional	Named after	Date	Site	Discoverer(s)	Category	Diam.	Ref
74901	1999 TP_{124}	—	October 4, 1999	Socorro	LINEAR	·	1.6 km	MPC · JPL
74902	1999 TS_{124}	—	October 4, 1999	Socorro	LINEAR	·	2.0 km	MPC · JPL
74903	1999 TT_{124}	—	October 4, 1999	Socorro	LINEAR	V	1.4 km	MPC · JPL
74904	1999 TV_{124}	—	October 4, 1999	Socorro	LINEAR	·	2.6 km	MPC · JPL
74905	1999 TQ_{125}	—	October 4, 1999	Socorro	LINEAR	·	2.1 km	MPC · JPL
74906	1999 TF_{129}	—	October 6, 1999	Socorro	LINEAR	·	2.3 km	MPC · JPL
74907	1999 TB_{136}	—	October 6, 1999	Socorro	LINEAR	·	2.0 km	MPC · JPL
74908	1999 TE_{138}	—	October 6, 1999	Socorro	LINEAR	·	2.2 km	MPC · JPL
74909	1999 TV_{139}	—	October 6, 1999	Socorro	LINEAR	NYS	2.3 km	MPC · JPL
74910	1999 TX_{139}	—	October 6, 1999	Socorro	LINEAR	·	1.4 km	MPC · JPL
74911	1999 TZ_{139}	—	October 6, 1999	Socorro	LINEAR	V	1.7 km	MPC · JPL
74912	1999 TE_{140}	—	October 6, 1999	Socorro	LINEAR	·	2.9 km	MPC · JPL
74913	1999 TL_{141}	—	October 6, 1999	Socorro	LINEAR	(2076)	1.8 km	MPC · JPL
74914	1999 TA_{143}	—	October 7, 1999	Socorro	LINEAR	·	2.4 km	MPC · JPL
74915	1999 TL_{143}	—	October 7, 1999	Socorro	LINEAR	·	2.2 km	MPC · JPL
74916	1999 TM_{143}	—	October 7, 1999	Socorro	LINEAR	·	3.0 km	MPC · JPL
74917	1999 TT_{143}	—	October 7, 1999	Socorro	LINEAR	·	2.5 km	MPC · JPL
74918	1999 TE_{144}	—	October 7, 1999	Socorro	LINEAR	·	1.6 km	MPC · JPL
74919	1999 TS_{144}	—	October 7, 1999	Socorro	LINEAR	·	2.0 km	MPC · JPL
74920	1999 TU_{144}	—	October 7, 1999	Socorro	LINEAR	·	1.5 km	MPC · JPL
74921	1999 TA_{145}	—	October 7, 1999	Socorro	LINEAR	·	2.0 km	MPC · JPL
74922	1999 TV_{146}	—	October 7, 1999	Socorro	LINEAR	NYS	2.0 km	MPC · JPL
74923	1999 TE_{151}	—	October 7, 1999	Socorro	LINEAR	·	2.0 km	MPC · JPL
74924	1999 TF_{151}	—	October 7, 1999	Socorro	LINEAR	V	1.9 km	MPC · JPL
74925	1999 TB_{152}	—	October 7, 1999	Socorro	LINEAR	·	2.2 km	MPC · JPL
74926	1999 TH_{153}	—	October 7, 1999	Socorro	LINEAR	·	2.0 km	MPC · JPL
74927	1999 TK_{153}	—	October 7, 1999	Socorro	LINEAR	·	2.4 km	MPC · JPL
74928	1999 TE_{154}	—	October 7, 1999	Socorro	LINEAR	·	1.7 km	MPC · JPL
74929	1999 TF_{156}	—	October 7, 1999	Socorro	LINEAR	·	2.8 km	MPC · JPL
74930	1999 TL_{156}	—	October 15, 1999	Socorro	LINEAR	·	1.7 km	MPC · JPL
74931	1999 TA_{159}	—	October 9, 1999	Socorro	LINEAR	·	2.1 km	MPC · JPL
74932	1999 TC_{161}	—	October 9, 1999	Socorro	LINEAR	·	1.5 km	MPC · JPL
74933	1999 TB_{162}	—	October 9, 1999	Socorro	LINEAR	·	2.7 km	MPC · JPL
74934	1999 TQ_{166}	—	October 10, 1999	Socorro	LINEAR	·	2.7 km	MPC · JPL
74935	1999 TC_{172}	—	October 10, 1999	Socorro	LINEAR	NYS	4.3 km	MPC · JPL
74936	1999 TD_{172}	—	October 10, 1999	Socorro	LINEAR	V	1.3 km	MPC · JPL
74937	1999 TO_{172}	—	October 10, 1999	Socorro	LINEAR	·	1.7 km	MPC · JPL
74938	1999 TC_{174}	—	October 10, 1999	Socorro	LINEAR	·	1.8 km	MPC · JPL
74939	1999 TO_{174}	—	October 10, 1999	Socorro	LINEAR	·	2.8 km	MPC · JPL
74940	1999 TX_{174}	—	October 10, 1999	Socorro	LINEAR	·	2.6 km	MPC · JPL
74941	1999 TB_{175}	—	October 10, 1999	Socorro	LINEAR	·	1.7 km	MPC · JPL
74942	1999 TO_{177}	—	October 10, 1999	Socorro	LINEAR	MRX	2.2 km	MPC · JPL
74943	1999 TW_{177}	—	October 10, 1999	Socorro	LINEAR	·	3.2 km	MPC · JPL
74944	1999 TN_{178}	—	October 10, 1999	Socorro	LINEAR	NYS	2.4 km	MPC · JPL
74945	1999 TV_{178}	—	October 10, 1999	Socorro	LINEAR	·	1.9 km	MPC · JPL
74946	1999 TA_{179}	—	October 10, 1999	Socorro	LINEAR	·	3.4 km	MPC · JPL
74947	1999 TB_{181}	—	October 10, 1999	Socorro	LINEAR	·	2.6 km	MPC · JPL
74948	1999 TJ_{181}	—	October 11, 1999	Socorro	LINEAR	MAS ·	2.0 km	MPC · JPL
74949	1999 TK_{187}	—	October 12, 1999	Socorro	LINEAR	·	1.4 km	MPC · JPL
74950	1999 TO_{188}	—	October 12, 1999	Socorro	LINEAR	·	4.3 km	MPC · JPL
74951	1999 TX_{190}	—	October 12, 1999	Socorro	LINEAR	PHO	1.6 km	MPC · JPL
74952	1999 TP_{191}	—	October 12, 1999	Socorro	LINEAR	·	2.7 km	MPC · JPL
74953	1999 TA_{193}	—	October 12, 1999	Socorro	LINEAR	V	1.1 km	MPC · JPL
74954	1999 TB_{194}	—	October 12, 1999	Socorro	LINEAR	·	2.9 km	MPC · JPL
74955	1999 TL_{195}	—	October 12, 1999	Socorro	LINEAR	·	4.0 km	MPC · JPL
74956	1999 TP_{195}	—	October 12, 1999	Socorro	LINEAR	·	2.6 km	MPC · JPL
74957	1999 TN_{196}	—	October 12, 1999	Socorro	LINEAR	EUN	2.0 km	MPC · JPL
74958	1999 TL_{197}	—	October 12, 1999	Socorro	LINEAR	V	1.2 km	MPC · JPL
74959	1999 TD_{198}	—	October 12, 1999	Socorro	LINEAR	(2076)	2.5 km	MPC · JPL
74960	1999 TR_{198}	—	October 12, 1999	Socorro	LINEAR	·	6.7 km	MPC · JPL
74961	1999 TV_{200}	—	October 13, 1999	Socorro	LINEAR	·	2.2 km	MPC · JPL
74962	1999 TW_{200}	—	October 13, 1999	Socorro	LINEAR	·	4.3 km	MPC · JPL
74963	1999 TX_{200}	—	October 13, 1999	Socorro	LINEAR	·	1.9 km	MPC · JPL
74964	1999 TA_{205}	—	October 13, 1999	Socorro	LINEAR	·	3.0 km	MPC · JPL
74965	1999 TS_{205}	—	October 13, 1999	Socorro	LINEAR	·	2.8 km	MPC · JPL
74966	1999 TB_{208}	—	October 14, 1999	Socorro	LINEAR	PHO	5.3 km	MPC · JPL
74967	1999 TA_{210}	—	October 14, 1999	Socorro	LINEAR	·	1.5 km	MPC · JPL
74968	1999 TW_{212}	—	October 15, 1999	Socorro	LINEAR	·	2.6 km	MPC · JPL
74969	1999 TZ_{215}	—	October 15, 1999	Socorro	LINEAR	·	1.6 km	MPC · JPL
74970	1999 TF_{217}	—	October 15, 1999	Socorro	LINEAR	·	2.2 km	MPC · JPL
74971	1999 TO_{217}	—	October 15, 1999	Socorro	LINEAR	·	2.0 km	MPC · JPL
74972	1999 TT_{218}	—	October 15, 1999	Socorro	LINEAR	·	3.4 km	MPC · JPL
74973	1999 TP_{220}	—	October 1, 1999	Catalina	CSS	·	2.6 km	MPC · JPL
74974	1999 TN_{222}	—	October 2, 1999	Catalina	CSS	NYS	1.7 km	MPC · JPL
74975	1999 TJ_{231}	—	October 5, 1999	Catalina	CSS	·	1.6 km	MPC · JPL
74976	1999 TG_{232}	—	October 5, 1999	Anderson Mesa	LONEOS	·	2.3 km	MPC · JPL
74977	1999 TC_{233}	—	October 7, 1999	Catalina	CSS	PHO	2.6 km	MPC · JPL
74978	1999 TY_{234}	—	October 3, 1999	Catalina	CSS	·	4.0 km	MPC · JPL
74979	1999 TP_{236}	—	October 3, 1999	Catalina	CSS	·	2.0 km	MPC · JPL
74980	1999 TT_{236}	—	October 3, 1999	Catalina	CSS	(2076)	2.1 km	MPC · JPL
74981	1999 TB_{240}	—	October 4, 1999	Catalina	CSS	·	1.5 km	MPC · JPL
74982	1999 TJ_{242}	—	October 4, 1999	Catalina	CSS	·	2.9 km	MPC · JPL
74983	1999 TP_{242}	—	October 4, 1999	Catalina	CSS	·	1.8 km	MPC · JPL
74984	1999 TW_{248}	—	October 8, 1999	Catalina	CSS	V	1.8 km	MPC · JPL
74985	1999 TD_{251}	—	October 5, 1999	Socorro	LINEAR	EUN	4.3 km	MPC · JPL
74986	1999 TZ_{251}	—	October 8, 1999	Socorro	LINEAR	·	1.4 km	MPC · JPL
74987	1999 TZ_{253}	—	October 11, 1999	Anderson Mesa	LONEOS	·	3.7 km	MPC · JPL
74988	1999 TN_{258}	—	October 9, 1999	Socorro	LINEAR	·	1.2 km	MPC · JPL
74989	1999 TO_{262}	—	October 15, 1999	Anderson Mesa	LONEOS	·	1.9 km	MPC · JPL
74990	1999 TO_{264}	—	October 2, 1999	Socorro	LINEAR	·	1.9 km	MPC · JPL
74991	1999 TD_{269}	—	October 3, 1999	Socorro	LINEAR	V	1.3 km	MPC · JPL
74992	1999 TT_{269}	—	October 3, 1999	Socorro	LINEAR	V	1.6 km	MPC · JPL
74993	1999 TU_{270}	—	October 3, 1999	Socorro	LINEAR	·	1.7 km	MPC · JPL
74994	1999 TH_{271}	—	October 3, 1999	Socorro	LINEAR	·	1.8 km	MPC · JPL
74995	1999 TQ_{271}	—	October 3, 1999	Socorro	LINEAR	V	1.7 km	MPC · JPL
74996	1999 TV_{271}	—	October 3, 1999	Socorro	LINEAR	V	2.0 km	MPC · JPL
74997	1999 TP_{274}	—	October 6, 1999	Socorro	LINEAR	·	1.3 km	MPC · JPL
74998	1999 TV_{276}	—	October 6, 1999	Socorro	LINEAR	·	3.4 km	MPC · JPL
74999	1999 TM_{278}	—	October 6, 1999	Socorro	LINEAR	V	2.1 km	MPC · JPL
75000	1999 TM_{279}	—	October 7, 1999	Socorro	LINEAR	·	2.6 km	MPC · JPL

back to top

== See also ==
- Meanings of minor-planet names: 74001–75000
