= Meanings of minor-planet names: 74001–75000 =

As minor planet discoveries are confirmed, they are given a permanent number by the IAU's Minor Planet Center (MPC), and the discoverers can then submit names for them, following the IAU's naming conventions. The list below concerns those minor planets in the specified number-range that have received names, and explains the meanings of those names.

Official naming citations of newly named small Solar System bodies are approved and published in a bulletin by IAU's Working Group for Small Bodies Nomenclature (WGSBN). Before May 2021, citations were published in MPC's Minor Planet Circulars for many decades. Recent citations can also be found on the JPL Small-Body Database (SBDB). Until his death in 2016, German astronomer Lutz D. Schmadel compiled these citations into the Dictionary of Minor Planet Names (DMP) and regularly updated the collection.

Based on Paul Herget's The Names of the Minor Planets, Schmadel also researched the unclear origin of numerous asteroids, most of which had been named prior to World War II. This article incorporates text from this source, which is in the public domain: SBDB New namings may only be added to this list below after official publication as the preannouncement of names is condemned. The WGSBN publishes a comprehensive guideline for the naming rules of non-cometary small Solar System bodies.

== 74001–74100 ==
Named minor planet	Provisional	This minor planet was named for...	Ref; Catalog
74024 Hrabě	1998 HR_{4}	Václav Hrabě (1940–1965), a Czech poet and writer who was the most important member of the Beat Generation in former Czechoslovakia. In 1965 he interviewed Allen Ginsberg in Prague. His poem Variation on a Renaissance theme, set to music by V. Mišík, became one of the most famous Czech songs.	JPL · 74024
74025 Marquette	1998 HA_{6}	Jean-Baptiste Marquette, retired French astrophysicist.	IAU · 74025
74080 Philippestee	1998 OW	Philippe Stee, French astrophysicist and president of the Paris Observatory.	IAU · 74080
74092 Xiangda	1998 QJ_{5}	Xiangtan University, Chinese university located in Hunan province; established the Key Laboratory for Stellar and Interstellar Physics	IAU · 74092
74093 Manuelalippi	1998 QU_{6}	Manuela Lippi, Italian researcher at INAF, Arcetri Observatory.	IAU · 74093

== 74101–74200 ==
back to top

Named minor planet	Provisional	This minor planet was named for...	Ref; Catalog
74168 Quentinleicht	1998 RK_{2}	Quentin Leicht, French science popularizer.	IAU · 74168

== 74201–74300 ==
back to top

Named minor planet	Provisional	This minor planet was named for...	Ref; Catalog
74227 Kraan-Korteweg	1998 SR_{13}	Renée Kraan-Korteweg, Dutch astronomer	IAU · 74227

== 74301–74400 ==
back to top

Named minor planet	Provisional	This minor planet was named for...	Ref; Catalog
74317 Marionbonafous	1998 UZ_{15}	Marion Bonafous, French engineer at the Laboratory of Instrumentation and Research in Astrophysics of Paris Observatory.	IAU · 74317
74370 Kolářjan	1998 XJ	Jan Kolár (born 1944) started his professional career in satellite remote sensing in 1975. Since the mid-90s he actively participated in the building of the Czech-ESA relations and significantly contributed to the creation of the Czech Space Office.	JPL · 74370
74371 Jeanduprat	1998 XG_{1}	Jean Duprat, French cosmochemist who is a senior researcher at the Institut de Minéralogie, de Physique des Matériaux et de Cosmochimie (IMPMC), Paris.	IAU · 74371
74373 Théodoremonod	1998 XF_{2}	Théodore Monod, French naturalist, explorer, geologist, and humanist.	IAU · 74373
74400 Streaky	1998 XH_{97}	"Streaky" is the name chosen by Eve Canovan, from Lancaster, UK, as the winner of a national competition to write a story that included an "asteroid" or "asteroids", which was run by the Centre for Life in conjunction with The Times Eureka Science magazine to enthuse and engage children about space.	JPL · 74400

== 74401–74500 ==
back to top

Named minor planet	Provisional	This minor planet was named for...	Ref; Catalog
74421 Yogilang	1999 AW_{24}	Yogi Lang, German musician and producer. Through his band RPWL and his solo albums, he has shaped progressive rock with creativity and passion.	IAU · 74421
74439 Brenden	1999 CT_{2}	Craig Brenden (born 1946), an American teacher of chemistry and an amateur astronomer. A co-founder of the Baton Rouge Astronomical Society, he has served the society as vice-president many times, and was editor of Night Visions (the society newsletter) for thirty years.	JPL · 74439

== 74501–74600 ==
back to top

Named minor planet	Provisional	This minor planet was named for...	Ref; Catalog
74503 Madola	1999 DN_{4}	Christian Marois (born 1974), René Doyon (born 1963) and David Lafrenière (born 1978) developed instruments that allowed seeing an extrasolar planetary system. Doyon was director of the Mt. Mégantic Observatory; Marois and Lafrenière were postdoctoral fellows at the Herzberg Institute and the University of Toronto	JPL · 74503
74509 Gillett	1999 FG_{7}	Frederick C. Gillett (1937–2001), an American pioneer in infrared astronomy, who was the discoverer of the infrared excess of Vega in 1983 using the Infrared Astronomy Satellite. The Gemini North 8-meter Telescope was renamed the Frederick C. Gillett Gemini Telescope in his honor on November 18, 2002.	JPL · 74509

== 74601–74700 ==
back to top

Named minor planet	Provisional	This minor planet was named for...	Ref; Catalog
74625 Tieproject	1999 RR_{34}	The Telescopes In Education (TIE) project makes it possible for many students around the world remotely to use telescopes at Mt. Wilson and Las Campanas, Chile. This is an innovative way to introduce astronomy to young people, among whom it has already developed intense interest (Src).	JPL · 74625

== 74701–74800 ==
back to top

Named minor planet	Provisional	This minor planet was named for...	Ref; Catalog
74764 Rudolfpešek	1999 RP_{213}	Rudolf Pešek (1905–1989) founded the Czech school of aerodynamic engineering. An enthusiastic supporter and popularizer of spaceflight, he became an active member of the International Astronautical Federation and the International Academy of Astronautics. He invented the famous abbreviation CETI, now SETI	JPL · 74764

== 74801–74900 ==
back to top

Named minor planet	Provisional	This minor planet was named for...	Ref; Catalog
74818 Iten	1999 TW_{10}	Marco Iten (born 1950), a Swiss goldsmith and a skilled model train hobbyist from Gordola. He is also an amateur astronomer who observes asteroidal occultations and meteoroid impacts on the Moon.	JPL · 74818
74824 Tarter	1999 TJ16	Jill Tarter (born 1944), an American radio-astronomer who searches for extraterrestrial intelligence at the SETI Institute using radio telescopes while holding the Bernard M. Oliver Chair for SETI. Her career inspired Carl Sagan to write the novel Contact. She has also encouraged thousands to assist SETI discovery using their home computers.	JPL · 74824

== 74901–75000 ==
back to top

Named minor planet	Provisional	This minor planet was named for...	Ref; Catalog
There are no named minor planets in this number range

back to top

Preceded by 73,001–74,000	Meanings of minor-planet names List of minor planets: 74,001–75,000	Succeeded by 75,001–76,000
