= Frank B. Zoltowski =

Australian astronomer

- Born: 1957 (age 68–69); Pennsylvania
- Years active: 1997-2003
- Known for: discovery of minor planets
- Parent(s): Frank Zoltowski, Constance Zoltowski

Minor planets discovered: 228
see § List of discovered minor planets

Frank B. Zoltowski (born 1957) is an Australian amateur astronomer and prolific discoverer of minor planets who lives in Woomera, South Australia. In 1998, he was awarded a "Gene Shoemaker NEO Grant" for improved near-Earth object searches.

Zoltowski conducts these searches from his home with a charge-coupled device camera. He is a prolific discoverer of asteroids. He authored CCDTRACK, a computer program that auto-guides electronically controlled telescopes by tracking a user-selected celestial object.

He is mentioned in NASA's asteroid tracking database as an observer for asteroid (285263) 1998 QE2. Astronomers at the Minor Planet Center used Zoltowski's work to work out an estimated approach distance for (137108) 1999 AN10 of 56,500 kilometers, and a closest approach date of Aug 7, 2027. It was thought to potentially crash into Earth.

The main-belt asteroid 18292 Zoltowski, discovered at the George R. Agassiz Station of the Harvard College Observatory in 1977, was named in his honor. The naming citation was published on 9 May 2001 (M.P.C. 42676).

== List of discovered minor planets ==
Frank Zoltowski is credited by the Minor Planet Center for the discovery of 228 numbered minor planets between 1997 and 2003.

| 8430 Florey | 25 December 1997 | list |
| 10203 Flinders | 1 August 1997 | list |
| 11150 Bragg | 21 December 1997 | list |
| 11195 Woomera | 15 January 1999 | list |
| 11212 Tebbutt | 18 April 1999 | list |
| 11356 Chuckjones | 18 December 1997 | list |
| 12102 Piazzolla | 5 May 1998 | list |
| (12103) 1998 KL | 19 May 1998 | list |
| (12495) 1998 FJ | 18 March 1998 | list |
| (12518) 1998 HM_{52} | 27 April 1998 | list |
| (12543) 1998 QM_{5} | 23 August 1998 | list |
| (12899) 1998 RN_{13} | 1 September 1998 | list |

| (12922) 1998 WW19 | 27 November 1998 | list |
| (13296) 1998 RV | 11 September 1998 | list |
| (13742) 1998 SX_{22} | 23 September 1998 | list |
| (13776) 1998 UK_{1} | 19 October 1998 | list |
| (14169) 1998 UZ_{24} | 25 October 1998 | list |
| (14204) 1999 AM_{20} | 12 January 1999 | list |
| (14530) 1997 PR | 1 August 1997 | list |
| (14536) 1997 RY_{2} | 3 September 1997 | list |
| (14557) 1997 VG_{8} | 15 November 1997 | list |
| (14592) 1998 SV_{22} | 20 September 1998 | list |
| (14991) 1997 UV_{14} | 31 October 1997 | list |
| (15043) 1998 XW_{9} | 11 December 1998 | list |

| (15383) 1997 SE_{3} | 21 September 1997 | list |
| (15410) 1997 YZ | 19 December 1997 | list |
| (15475) 1999 BQ_{14} | 24 January 1999 | list |
| (15936) 1997 YM_{4} | 22 December 1997 | list |
| (16916) 1998 FM_{15} | 27 March 1998 | list |
| (16963) 1998 RE_{2} | 12 September 1998 | list |
| (17227) 2000 CW_{80} | 11 February 2000 | list |
| (17708) 1997 WB | 18 November 1997 | list |
| (17750) 1998 DZ_{1} | 18 February 1998 | list |
| (17775) 1998 FH | 18 March 1998 | list |
| (17828) 1998 HK_{8} | 22 April 1998 | list |
| (17854) 1998 JC_{4} | 5 May 1998 | list |

| (17916) 1999 GZ_{3} | 10 April 1999 | list |
| (18600) 1998 BK_{10} | 24 January 1998 | list |
| (18757) 1999 HT | 18 April 1999 | list |
| (19375) 1998 AB_{5} | 6 January 1998 | list |
| (19387) 1998 DA_{2} | 18 February 1998 | list |
| (19404) 1998 FO_{5} | 24 March 1998 | list |
| (19471) 1998 HK_{52} | 25 April 1998 | list |
| (19472) 1998 HL_{52} | 27 April 1998 | list |
| (19505) 1998 MC | 16 June 1998 | list |
| (19566) 1999 KO_{6} | 23 May 1999 | list |
| (19579) 1999 MB_{1} | 23 June 1999 | list |
| (20319) 1998 GK_{1} | 5 April 1998 | list |

| (20365) 1998 KD_{5} | 24 May 1998 | list |
| (20398) 1998 NQ | 11 July 1998 | list |
| (20457) 1999 LX_{7} | 10 June 1999 | list |
| (20463) 1999 MC_{1} | 23 June 1999 | list |
| (20464) 1999 MD_{1} | 24 June 1999 | list |
| (20619) 1999 SB_{10} | 30 September 1999 | list |
| (21442) 1998 GF_{1} | 4 April 1998 | list |
| (21567) 1998 RB_{2} | 1 September 1998 | list |
| (22620) 1998 KZ_{26} | 23 May 1998 | list |
| (22634) 1998 MN_{7} | 22 June 1998 | list |
| (22636) 1998 MV_{13} | 25 June 1998 | list |
| (22761) 1998 YH_{4} | 16 December 1998 | list |

| (22770) 1999 BR_{14} | 24 January 1999 | list |
| (23740) 1998 KP_{3} | 25 May 1998 | list |
| (23793) 1998 QK_{26} | 23 August 1998 | list |
| (23846) 1998 RF | 1 September 1998 | list |
| (24958) 1997 SS_{31} | 28 September 1997 | list |
| (25008) 1998 PL | 8 August 1998 | list |
| (25009) 1998 PG_{1} | 15 August 1998 | list |
| (25028) 1998 QL_{26} | 25 August 1998 | list |
| (25839) 2000 ES_{50} | 11 March 2000 | list |
| (26226) 1998 GJ_{1} | 4 April 1998 | list |
| (26280) 1998 SW_{22} | 20 September 1998 | list |
| (26354) 1998 YJ_{4} | 16 December 1998 | list |

| (26980) 1997 UQ_{10} | 29 October 1997 | list |
| (26983) 1997 VA | 1 November 1997 | list |
| (27124) 1998 WA_{20} | 29 November 1998 | list |
| (27166) 1999 AN_{20} | 12 January 1999 | list |
| (27183) 1999 CF_{4} | 10 February 1999 | list |
| (28029) 1998 DW_{9} | 20 February 1998 | list |
| (28363) 1999 GN_{6} | 14 April 1999 | list |
| (28372) 1999 HU | 18 April 1999 | list |
| (29495) 1997 WU_{7} | 27 November 1997 | list |
| (29739) 1999 BM_{9} | 16 January 1999 | list |
| (29751) 1999 CE_{4} | 9 February 1999 | list |
| (29752) 1999 CG_{4} | 10 February 1999 | list |

| (29831) 1999 EV_{4} | 13 March 1999 | list |
| (31350) 1998 SF_{2} | 17 September 1998 | list |
| (31606) 1999 GX_{4} | 13 April 1999 | list |
| (31668) 1999 JX_{3} | 6 May 1999 | list |
| (33099) 1997 YN_{8} | 27 December 1997 | list |
| (33178) 1998 FL_{15} | 27 March 1998 | list |
| (33211) 1998 FG_{74} | 30 March 1998 | list |
| (33286) 1998 KA | 16 May 1998 | list |
| (33321) 1998 QL | 17 August 1998 | list |
| (33533) 1999 HV_{3} | 19 April 1999 | list |
| (33712) 1999 LE_{19} | 10 June 1999 | list |
| (35480) 1998 FN_{5} | 24 March 1998 | list |

| (35485) 1998 FZ_{14} | 24 March 1998 | list |
| (35562) 1998 GL_{1} | 5 April 1998 | list |
| (35622) 1998 JF_{4} | 5 May 1998 | list |
| (35729) 1999 GZ_{4} | 13 April 1999 | list |
| (35758) 1999 HE | 16 April 1999 | list |
| (35759) 1999 HQ | 17 April 1999 | list |
| (37819) 1998 BE_{5} | 20 January 1998 | list |
| (37936) 1998 GH_{1} | 4 April 1998 | list |
| (38209) 1999 NE | 4 July 1999 | list |
| (38444) 1999 SY_{9} | 29 September 1999 | list |
| (39889) 1998 FG | 17 March 1998 | list |
| (40027) 1998 JH_{4} | 15 May 1998 | list |

| (40100) 1998 PV | 12 August 1998 | list |
| (40105) 1998 QL_{4} | 17 August 1998 | list |
| (40170) 1998 RK | 1 September 1998 | list |
| (42617) 1998 FJ_{1} | 20 March 1998 | list |
| (44168) 1998 JJ_{4} | 15 May 1998 | list |
| (44198) 1998 MP_{24} | 25 June 1998 | list |
| (44308) 1998 RG | 1 September 1998 | list |
| (44486) 1998 WZ_{19} | 29 November 1998 | list |
| (46847) 1998 QM_{26} | 25 August 1998 | list |
| (46918) 1998 SC | 16 September 1998 | list |
| (48783) 1997 SR | 20 September 1997 | list |
| (48787) 1997 SY_{4} | 26 September 1997 | list |

| (48833) 1997 YA_{5} | 24 December 1997 | list |
| (48899) 1998 MM_{7} | 17 June 1998 | list |
| (48930) 1998 PW | 14 August 1998 | list |
| (48937) 1998 QN_{4} | 21 August 1998 | list |
| (49039) 1998 RH | 1 September 1998 | list |
| (49042) 1998 RD_{2} | 12 September 1998 | list |
| (49271) 1998 UG_{15} | 20 October 1998 | list |
| (51280) 2000 KG_{4} | 24 May 2000 | list |
| (52614) 1997 UP_{10} | 29 October 1997 | list |
| (52618) 1997 VP_{2} | 4 November 1997 | list |
| (52759) 1998 MW_{13} | 25 June 1998 | list |
| (52771) 1998 PX | 14 August 1998 | list |

| (53144) 1999 BN_{9} | 22 January 1999 | list |
| (55867) 1997 RX_{2} | 3 September 1997 | list |
| (55882) 1997 WY_{1} | 20 November 1997 | list |
| (55899) 1998 BJ_{10} | 24 January 1998 | list |
| (56044) 1998 XU_{17} | 15 December 1998 | list |
| (56218) 1999 HP_{4} | 26 April 1999 | list |
| (56278) 1999 KB | 16 May 1999 | list |
| (58936) 1998 PJ_{1} | 13 August 1998 | list |
| (59422) 1999 GD_{4} | 12 April 1999 | list |
| (59423) 1999 GE_{4} | 12 April 1999 | list |
| (59471) 1999 HP | 17 April 1999 | list |
| (59758) 1999 MH | 18 June 1999 | list |

| (59761) 1999 MZ | 23 June 1999 | list |
| (60531) 2000 EF_{50} | 9 March 2000 | list |
| (65958) 1998 GG_{1} | 4 April 1998 | list |
| (66001) 1998 OG_{1} | 17 July 1998 | list |
| (66279) 1999 JK_{11} | 12 May 1999 | list |
| (69761) 1998 QM_{4} | 21 August 1998 | list |
| (69844) 1998 SY_{22} | 23 September 1998 | list |
| (70057) 1999 JJ_{11} | 12 May 1999 | list |
| (70122) 1999 MX | 22 June 1999 | list |
| (70123) 1999 ME_{1} | 24 June 1999 | list |
| (70124) 1999 NY | 10 July 1999 | list |
| (70220) 1999 RF_{44} | 13 September 1999 | list |

| (70430) 1999 TM_{2} | 2 October 1999 | list |
| (70432) 1999 TO_{3} | 3 October 1999 | list |
| (71551) 2000 DW_{6} | 27 February 2000 | list |
| (73992) 1998 FK_{1} | 20 March 1998 | list |
| (74019) 1998 GY | 2 April 1998 | list |
| (74026) 1998 HL_{8} | 22 April 1998 | list |
| (74069) 1998 MO_{7} | 22 June 1998 | list |
| (74078) 1998 NP | 3 July 1998 | list |
| (74079) 1998 NS | 11 July 1998 | list |
| (74121) 1998 QT_{53} | 28 August 1998 | list |
| (74362) 1998 WY_{19} | 29 November 1998 | list |
| (74534) 1999 JA | 1 May 1999 | list |

| (75850) 2000 CC | 2 February 2000 | list |
| (77958) 2002 HR_{10} | 21 April 2002 | list |
| (79517) 1998 MD | 16 June 1998 | list |
| (79518) 1998 MF_{3} | 16 June 1998 | list |
| (80084) 1999 KN_{6} | 23 May 1999 | list |
| (80692) 2000 CD | 2 February 2000 | list |
| (84778) 2002 XP_{59} | 10 December 2002 | list |
| (85481) 1997 OG_{1} | 27 July 1997 | list |
| (85647) 1998 PZ | 14 August 1998 | list |
| (85675) 1998 RC_{2} | 3 September 1998 | list |
| (85971) 1999 GW_{5} | 15 April 1999 | list |
| (90921) 1997 QP_{4} | 22 August 1997 | list |

| (91112) 1998 HJ_{52} | 25 April 1998 | list |
| (91401) 1999 MY | 22 June 1999 | list |
| (91402) 1999 NW | 9 July 1999 | list |
| (92489) 2000 MK | 24 June 2000 | list |
| (96436) 1998 FS_{72} | 28 March 1998 | list |
| (96722) 1999 LO_{4} | 10 June 1999 | list |
| (99916) 1998 AA_{5} | 3 January 1998 | list |
| (100898) 1998 JG_{4} | 15 May 1998 | list |
| (101494) 1998 XD_{3} | 8 December 1998 | list |
| (101859) 1999 LA | 2 June 1999 | list |
| (104766) 2000 HG_{24} | 29 April 2000 | list |
| (112050) 2002 JF_{9} | 7 May 2002 | list |

| (114299) 2002 XL_{37} | 9 December 2002 | list |
| (114392) 2002 YK_{7} | 31 December 2002 | list |
| (118367) 1999 GC_{4} | 12 April 1999 | list |
| (120853) 1998 QK_{4} | 17 August 1998 | list |
| (121122) 1999 HW_{3} | 21 April 1999 | list |
| (121233) 1999 RU_{36} | 10 September 1999 | list |
| (121853) 2000 CT_{34} | 3 February 2000 | list |
| (129770) 1999 HV | 18 April 1999 | list |
| (129812) 1999 MA_{1} | 23 June 1999 | list |
| (130611) 2000 SP_{23} | 26 September 2000 | list |
| (137241) 1999 RV_{36} | 11 September 1999 | list |
| (138118) 2000 EA_{4} | 1 March 2000 | list |

| (138142) 2000 EE_{50} | 9 March 2000 | list |
| (145989) 2000 BL_{15} | 30 January 2000 | list |
| (150179) 1998 FN_{15} | 27 March 1998 | list |
| (152757) 1999 JL_{11} | 12 May 1999 | list |
| (164767) 1998 YK_{4} | 18 December 1998 | list |
| (175739) 1998 JL_{4} | 5 May 1998 | list |
| (175741) 1998 MQ_{24} | 26 June 1998 | list |
| (176996) 2003 AW_{16} | 5 January 2003 | list |
| (182133) 2000 SO_{23} | 26 September 2000 | list |
| (192630) 1999 LL | 5 June 1999 | list |
| (200154) 1998 RJ | 1 September 1998 | list |
| (210510) 1998 NR | 11 July 1998 | list |

| (216924) 1998 QV_{53} | 26 August 1998 | list |
| (217231) 2003 BY_{46} | 31 January 2003 | list |
| (234069) 1999 OA | 16 July 1999 | list |
| (234144) 2000 ET_{50} | 11 March 2000 | list |
| (234714) 2002 JX_{67} | 11 May 2002 | list |
| (257573) 1999 CH_{4} | 10 February 1999 | list |
| (257848) 2000 MJ | 24 June 2000 | list |
| (259171) 2003 AB | 1 January 2003 | list |
| (269858) 2000 EB_{4} | 4 March 2000 | list |
| (285280) 1998 SF_{28} | 24 September 1998 | list |
| (344573) 2003 AV_{16} | 5 January 2003 | list |
| (461350) 1998 PY | 14 August 1998 | list |
| (483407) 1999 SL_{1} | 16 September 1999* | list |

== See also ==
- List of minor planet discoverers
