= 74503 Madola =

Main-belt asteroid

Discovery
- Discovered by: D. Bergeron
- Discovery site: Val-des-Bois Obs.
- Discovery date: 23 February 1999

Designations
- Named after: Christian Marois; René Doyon; David Lafrenière (Canadian astronomers)
- Alternative designations: 1999 DN_{4}
- Minor planet category: main-belt · (outer) background

Orbital characteristics
- Epoch 4 September 2017 (JD 2458000.5)
- Uncertainty parameter 0
- Observation arc: 22.36 yr (8,166 days)
- Aphelion: 3.5703 AU
- Perihelion: 2.4599 AU
- Semi-major axis: 3.0151 AU
- Eccentricity: 0.1841
- Orbital period (sidereal): 5.24 yr (1,912 days)
- Mean anomaly: 163.66°
- Mean motion: 0° 11^{m} 17.88^{s} / day
- Inclination: 17.177°
- Longitude of ascending node: 357.01°
- Argument of perihelion: 200.95°

Physical characteristics
- Mean diameter: 4.481±0.179 km
- Geometric albedo: 0.085±0.012
- Absolute magnitude (H): 15.3

74503 Madola (provisional designation 1999 DN_{4}) is a background asteroid from the outer region of the asteroid belt, approximately 4.5 kilometers in diameter. It was discovered on 23 February 1999, by Canadian astronomer Denis Bergeron at the Val-des-Bois Observatory in Quebec, Canada. The asteroid was named for the three Canadian astronomers Christian Marois, René Doyon and David Lafrenière.

== Orbit and classification ==
Madola is a non-family from the main belt's background population. It orbits the Sun in the outer asteroid belt at a distance of 2.5–3.6 AU once every 5 years and 3 months (1,912 days; semi-major axis of 3.02 AU). Its orbit has an eccentricity of 0.18 and an inclination of 17° with respect to the ecliptic. The body's observation arc begins with a precovery taken by Spacewatch in April 1994, almost 6 years prior to its official discovery observation at Val-des-Bois.

== Physical characteristics ==
=== Diameter and albedo ===
According to the survey carried out by the NEOWISE mission of NASA's Wide-field Infrared Survey Explorer, Madola measures 4.481 kilometers in diameter and its surface has an albedo of 0.085.

=== Rotation period ===
As of 2018, no rotational lightcurve of Madola has been obtained from photometric observations. The body's rotation period, pole and shape remain unknown.

== Naming ==
This minor planet was named in honor of Canadian astronomers Christian Marois (born 1974), René Doyon (born 1963) and David Lafrenière (born 1978). They had developed instruments and techniques that allowed them to be the first to directly photograph an extrasolar planetary system, namely the first three planets orbiting the star HR 8799 in the constellation Pegasus. At the time of naming this asteroid, René Doyon was the director of the Canadian Mont Mégantic Observatory, while Christian Marois and David Lafrenière were postdocs at the Herzberg Institute of Astrophysics and the University of Toronto.

The official naming citation was published by the Minor Planet Center on 9 April 2009 (M.P.C. 65712).
