= List of named minor planets: 70000–79999 =

This is a partial list of named minor planets in numerical order. It contains a total of 289 entries as of 19 October 2026. Minor planets for which no article exist are displayed in grey color and redirect to the list of minor planets (see List of minor planets § Main index).

== From 70,000 to 79,999 ==
- 70004 Richardgalli
- 70030 Margaretmiller
- 70179 Beppechiara
- 70207 Davidunlap
- 70210 Cesarelombardi
- 70401 Davidbishop
- 70409 Srnín
- 70418 Kholopov
- 70444 Genovali
- 70446 Pugh
- 70449 Gruebel
- 70679 Urzidil
- 70710 Chuckfellows
- 70711 Arlinbartels
- 70712 Danieljoanna
- 70713 Sethmacfarlane
- 70714 Rizk
- 70715 Allancheuvront
- 70716 Mehall
- 70718 HEAF
- 70720 Davidskillman
- 70728 Gal-Edd
- 70737 Stenflo
- 70744 Maffucci
- 70745 Aleserpieri
- 70781 Donnelly
- 70782 Vinceelliott
- 70783 Kenwilliams
- 70850 Schur
- 70936 Kámen
- 70942 Vandanashiva
- 70995 Mikemorton
- 71000 Hughdowns
- 71001 Natspasoc
- 71282 Holuby
- 71445 Marc
- 71461 Chowmeeyee
- 71480 Roberthatt
- 71482 Jennamarie
- 71483 Dickgottfried
- 71485 Brettman
- 71489 Dynamocamp
- 71538 Robertfried
- 71539 VanZandt
- 71555 Manuecharpentier
- 71556 Page
- 71615 Ramakers
- 71669 Dodsonprince
- 71783 Izeryna
- 71855 Incamajorca
- 71885 Denning
- 71971 Lindaketcham
- 72012 Terute
- 72021 Yisunji
- 72037 Castelldefels
- 72042 Dequeiroz
- 72059 Heojun
- 72060 Hohhot
- 72071 Gábor
- 72432 Kimrobinson
- 72447 Polińska
- 72543 Simonemarchi
- 72545 Robbiiwessen
- 72596 Zilkha
- 72632 Coralina
- 72633 Randygroth
- 72801 Manzanera
- 72802 Wetton
- 72804 Caldentey
- 72819 Brunet
- 72827 Maxaub
- 72834 Guywells
- 72841 Manolaneri
- 72876 Vauriot
- 72912 Fobarsti
- 72949 Colesanti
- 72993 Hannahlivsey
- 73046 Davidmann
- 73059 Kaunas
- 73073 Jannaleuty
- 73079 Davidbaltimore
- 73199 Orlece
- 73342 Guyunusa
- 73358 Kitwhitten
- 73442 Feruglio
- 73453 Ninomanfredi
- 73465 Buonanno
- 73491 Robmatson
- 73511 Lovas
- 73517 Cranbrook
- 73520 Boslough
- 73529 Giorgiopalumbo
- 73533 Alonso
- 73534 Liviasavioli
- 73539 Carmenperrella
- 73551 Dariocastellano
- 73610 Klyuchevskaya
- 73637 Guneus
- 73638 Likhanov
- 73640 Biermann
- 73670 Kurthopf
- 73686 Nussdorf
- 73687 Thomas Aquinas
- 73692 Gürtler
- 73693 Dorschner
- 73699 Landaupfalz
- 73700 von Kues
- 73701 Siegfriedbauer
- 73703 Billings
- 73704 Hladiuk
- 73719 Rotaryterni
- 73767 Bibiandersson
- 73769 Delphi
- 73782 Yanagida
- 73819 Isaootuki
- 73827 Nakanohoshinokai
- 73857 Hitaneichi
- 73862 Mochigasechugaku
- 73872 Stefanoragazzi
- 73883 Asteraude
- 73885 Kalaymoodley
- 73891 Pietromennea
- 73933 Philippeamram
- 73936 Takeyamamoto
- 73955 Asaka
- 73965 Michelmathieu
- 73984 Claudebernard
- 74024 Hrabě
- 74025 Marquette
- 74080 Philippestée
- 74092 Xiangda
- 74093 Manuelalippi
- 74168 Quentinleicht
- 74227 Kraan-Korteweg
- 74317 Marionbonafous
- 74370 Kolářjan
- 74371 Jeanduprat
- 74373 Théodoremonod
- 74400 Streaky
- 74421 Yogilang
- 74439 Brenden
- 74503 Madola
- 74509 Gillett
- 74625 Tieproject
- 74764 Rudolfpešek
- 74818 Iten
- 74824 Tarter
- 75009 Petervereš
- 75058 Hanau
- 75063 Koestler
- 75072 Timerskine
- 75190 Segreliliana
- 75223 Wupatki
- 75225 Corradoaugias
- 75308 Shoin
- 75423 Gladyswest
- 75555 Wonaszek
- 75562 Wilkening
- 75564 Audubon
- 75569 IRSOL
- 75570 Jenőwigner
- 75591 Stonemose
- 75823 Csokonai
- 75829 Alyea
- 75836 Warrenastro
- 75837 Johnbriol
- 75841 Brendahuettner
- 75842 Jackmonahan
- 75844 Rexadams
- 75846 Jandorf
- 75852 Elgie
- 75969 Backhouse
- 75970 Olcott
- 75971 Unkingalls
- 75972 Huddleston
- 75996 Piekiel
- 76000 Juliuserving
- 76272 De Jong
- 76309 Ronferdie
- 76310 Kurczewski
- 76628 Kozí Hrádek
- 76713 Wudia
- 76818 Brianenke
- 77044 Galera-Rosillo
- 77136 Mendillo
- 77138 Puiching
- 77166 McKaye
- 77185 Cherryh
- 77318 Danieltsui
- 77441 Jouve
- 77560 Furusato
- 77621 Koten
- 77696 Patriciann
- 77755 Delémont
- 77856 Noblitt
- 77870 MOTESS
- 77971 Donnolo
- 78071 Vicent
- 78115 Skiantonucci
- 78118 Bharat
- 78123 Dimare
- 78124 Cicalò
- 78125 Salimbeni
- 78221 Leonmow
- 78249 Capaccioni
- 78252 Priscio
- 78309 Alessielisa
- 78310 Spoto
- 78383 Philmassey
- 78386 Deuzelur
- 78391 Michaeljäger
- 78392 Dellinger
- 78393 Dillon
- 78394 Garossino
- 78429 Baschek
- 78430 Andrewpearce
- 78431 Kemble
- 78432 Helensailer
- 78433 Gertrudolf
- 78434 Dyer
- 78453 Bullock
- 78534 Renmir
- 78535 Carloconti
- 78536 Shrbený
- 78577 JPL
- 78578 Donpettit
- 78652 Quero
- 78661 Castelfranco
- 78756 Sloan
- 78799 Xewioso
- 78816 Caripito
- 78830 Simonadirubbo
- 78867 Isakowitz
- 78905 Seanokeefe
- 78948 Pietrasanta
- 79086 Gorgasali
- 79087 Scheidt
- 79117 Brydonejack
- 79129 Robkoldewey
- 79130 Bandanomori
- 79138 Mansfeld
- 79144 Cervantes
- 79149 Kajigamori
- 79152 Abukumagawa
- 79212 Martadigrazia
- 79240 Rosanna
- 79241 Fulviobressan
- 79254 Tsuda
- 79271 Bellagio
- 79286 Hexiantu
- 79316 Huangshan
- 79333 Yusaku
- 79347 Medlov
- 79353 Andrewalday
- 79354 Brundibár
- 79360 Sila–Nunam
- 79375 Valetti
- 79382 Aliprandi
- 79410 Wallerius
- 79417 Tonylevin
- 79418 Zhangjiajie
- 79419 Gaolu
- 79436 Steverothery
- 79472 Chiorny
- 79485 Stevehackett
- 79641 Daniloceirani
- 79643 Martynware
- 79645 Jancovici
- 79647 Ballack
- 79694 Nanrendong
- 79766 Aurorestéphant
- 79810 Giancarlociani
- 79811 Fengzikai
- 79826 Finardi
- 79842 Jourdain
- 79847 Colzani
- 79849 Denismourard
- 79864 Pirituba
- 79869 Pascalfouqué
- 79871 Earthrise
- 79889 Maloka
- 79893 Gasparelocurto
- 79896 Billhaley
- 79900 Coreglia
- 79902 Schmidtobreick
- 79912 Terrell
- 79989 Selman
- 79991 Umbertoleotti
- 79996 Vittoria
back to top

== See also ==
- List of minor planet discoverers
- List of planets
- List of observatory codes
- Meanings of minor planet names § Index
