= Meanings of minor-planet names: 77001–78000 =

As minor planet discoveries are confirmed, they are given a permanent number by the IAU's Minor Planet Center (MPC), and the discoverers can then submit names for them, following the IAU's naming conventions. The list below concerns those minor planets in the specified number-range that have received names, and explains the meanings of those names.

Official naming citations of newly named small Solar System bodies are approved and published in a bulletin by IAU's Working Group for Small Bodies Nomenclature (WGSBN). Before May 2021, citations were published in MPC's Minor Planet Circulars for many decades. Recent citations can also be found on the JPL Small-Body Database (SBDB). Until his death in 2016, German astronomer Lutz D. Schmadel compiled these citations into the Dictionary of Minor Planet Names (DMP) and regularly updated the collection.

Based on Paul Herget's The Names of the Minor Planets, Schmadel also researched the unclear origin of numerous asteroids, most of which had been named prior to World War II. This article incorporates text from this source, which is in the public domain: SBDB New namings may only be added to this list below after official publication as the preannouncement of names is condemned. The WGSBN publishes a comprehensive guideline for the naming rules of non-cometary small Solar System bodies.

== 77001–77100 ==
Named minor planet	Provisional	This minor planet was named for...	Ref · Catalog
77044 Galera-Rosillo	2001 CE_{42}	Rebeca Galera-Rosillo (1988–2020) was a promising young Spanish scientist who earned her master's degree in astrophysics from the University of La Laguna. At the time of her death, she was close to defending her doctoral research on planetary nebulae at the Instituto de Astrofisica de Canarias.	IAU · 77044

== 77101–77200 ==
back to top

Named minor planet	Provisional	This minor planet was named for...	Ref · Catalog
77136 Mendillo	2001 DP_{106}	Michael Mendillo (born 1944), American professor of astronomy and electrical engineering at Boston University	JPL · 77136
77138 Puiching	2001 EN	Pui Ching Middle School, Hong Kong. It was founded in 1889.	JPL · 77138
77166 McKaye	2001 EV_{19}	John E. "Jack" McKaye (1948–2022), amateur astronomer.	JPL · 77166
77185 Cherryh	2001 FE_{9}	C. J. Cherryh (born 1942), an American science fiction and fantasy writer	JPL · 77185

== 77201–77300 ==
back to top

Named minor planet	Provisional	This minor planet was named for...	Ref · Catalog
There are no named minor planets in this number range

== 77301–77400 ==
back to top

Named minor planet	Provisional	This minor planet was named for...	Ref · Catalog
77318 Danieltsui	2001 FL_{86}	Daniel C. Tsui (born 1939), Chinese-American physicist and Nobelist, a graduate of Pui Ching Middle School in Hong Kong (see 77138)	JPL · 77318

== 77401–77500 ==
back to top

Named minor planet	Provisional	This minor planet was named for...	Ref · Catalog
77441 Jouve	2001 HU	Jacques Jouve (born 1929), involved in the construction of the Observatory of Saint-Veran, a station of the Paris Observatory that studies the solar corona, in the French Alps	JPL · 77441

== 77501–77600 ==
back to top

Named minor planet	Provisional	This minor planet was named for...	Ref · Catalog
77560 Furusato	2001 KP_{1}	Furusato is a well-known song in Japan. The word also means "country home".	JPL · 77560

== 77601–77700 ==
back to top

Named minor planet	Provisional	This minor planet was named for...	Ref · Catalog
77621 Koten	2001 KZ_{41}	Pavel Koten (born 1972), a staff astronomer at the Astronomical Institute of the Academy of Sciences of the Czech Republic.	JPL · 77621
77696 Patriciann	2001 OT_{2}	Patricia Ann Clingan (born 1949), wife of amateur astronomer Roy Clingan who discovered this minor planet	JPL · 77696

== 77701–77800 ==
back to top

Named minor planet	Provisional	This minor planet was named for...	Ref · Catalog
77755 Delémont	2001 PW_{13}	Delémont, Switzerland, where the Jurassien-Vicques Observatory is situated	JPL · 77755

== 77801–77900 ==
back to top

Named minor planet	Provisional	This minor planet was named for...	Ref · Catalog
77856 Noblitt	2001 RN_{63}	Niles Noblitt (born 1951), American member of the board of trustees of the Rose-Hulman Institute and loyal supporter of the Rose-Hulman Observatory, where this minor planet was discovered	JPL · 77856
77870 MOTESS	2001 SM	MOTESS (Moving Object and Transient Event Search System), using three 0.35-meter reflecting telescopes, operating in Tucson, Arizona, that has observed and discovered small Solar System objects	JPL · 77870

== 77901–78000 ==
back to top

Named minor planet	Provisional	This minor planet was named for...	Ref · Catalog
77971 Donnolo	2002 JA_{11}	Shabbethai Donnolo (913–982), an Italian physician, medical author and astrologer/astronomer	JPL · 77971

back to top

Preceded by 76,001–77,000	Meanings of minor-planet names List of minor planets: 77,001–78,000	Succeeded by 78,001–79,000
