= List of minor planets: 77001–78000 =

The following is a partial list of minor planets, running from minor-planet number 77001 through 78000, inclusive. The primary data for this and other partial lists is based on JPL's "Small-Body Orbital Elements" and data available from the Minor Planet Center. Critical list information is also provided by the MPC, unless otherwise specified from Lowell Observatory. A detailed description of the table's columns and additional sources are given on the main page including a complete list of every page in this series, and a statistical break-up on the dynamical classification of minor planets.

Also see the summary list of all named bodies in numerical and alphabetical order, and the corresponding naming citations for the number range of this particular list. New namings may only be added to this list after official publication, as the preannouncement of names is condemned by the Working Group for Small Bodies Nomenclature of the International Astronomical Union.

Near-Earth obj.	MBA (inner)	MBA (outer)	Centaur
Mars-crosser	MBA (middle)	Jupiter trojan	Trans-Neptunian obj.
Unclassified

== 77001–77100 ==
Designation			Discovery			Properties		Ref
Permanent	Provisional	Named after	Date	Site	Discoverer(s)	Category	Diam.	Ref
77001	2001 CN_{3}	—	February 1, 2001	Socorro	LINEAR	(194)	5.9 km	MPC · JPL
77002	2001 CR_{4}	—	February 1, 2001	Socorro	LINEAR	·	1.5 km	MPC · JPL
77003	2001 CT_{4}	—	February 1, 2001	Socorro	LINEAR	·	1.7 km	MPC · JPL
77004	2001 CW_{4}	—	February 1, 2001	Socorro	LINEAR	·	1.6 km	MPC · JPL
77005	2001 CH_{5}	—	February 1, 2001	Socorro	LINEAR	·	2.3 km	MPC · JPL
77006	2001 CT_{5}	—	February 1, 2001	Socorro	LINEAR	·	1.8 km	MPC · JPL
77007	2001 CT_{7}	—	February 1, 2001	Socorro	LINEAR	·	2.3 km	MPC · JPL
77008	2001 CD_{8}	—	February 1, 2001	Socorro	LINEAR	·	1.5 km	MPC · JPL
77009	2001 CF_{8}	—	February 1, 2001	Socorro	LINEAR	·	2.3 km	MPC · JPL
77010	2001 CB_{9}	—	February 1, 2001	Socorro	LINEAR	·	6.4 km	MPC · JPL
77011	2001 CT_{11}	—	February 1, 2001	Socorro	LINEAR	·	1.8 km	MPC · JPL
77012	2001 CX_{11}	—	February 1, 2001	Socorro	LINEAR	·	2.1 km	MPC · JPL
77013	2001 CJ_{12}	—	February 1, 2001	Socorro	LINEAR	·	1.3 km	MPC · JPL
77014	2001 CM_{12}	—	February 1, 2001	Socorro	LINEAR	·	1.9 km	MPC · JPL
77015	2001 CU_{12}	—	February 1, 2001	Socorro	LINEAR	·	4.6 km	MPC · JPL
77016	2001 CX_{12}	—	February 1, 2001	Socorro	LINEAR	·	1.9 km	MPC · JPL
77017	2001 CH_{13}	—	February 1, 2001	Socorro	LINEAR	PHO	3.1 km	MPC · JPL
77018	2001 CO_{13}	—	February 1, 2001	Socorro	LINEAR	SUL	4.7 km	MPC · JPL
77019	2001 CP_{13}	—	February 1, 2001	Socorro	LINEAR	·	2.2 km	MPC · JPL
77020	2001 CG_{15}	—	February 1, 2001	Socorro	LINEAR	(5)	2.1 km	MPC · JPL
77021	2001 CY_{15}	—	February 1, 2001	Socorro	LINEAR	NYS	2.4 km	MPC · JPL
77022	2001 CQ_{16}	—	February 1, 2001	Socorro	LINEAR	·	2.5 km	MPC · JPL
77023	2001 CD_{19}	—	February 2, 2001	Socorro	LINEAR	·	3.6 km	MPC · JPL
77024	2001 CU_{21}	—	February 1, 2001	Anderson Mesa	LONEOS	V	1.8 km	MPC · JPL
77025	2001 CW_{21}	—	February 1, 2001	Anderson Mesa	LONEOS	V	1.3 km	MPC · JPL
77026	2001 CC_{23}	—	February 1, 2001	Anderson Mesa	LONEOS	slow	2.3 km	MPC · JPL
77027	2001 CH_{26}	—	February 1, 2001	Socorro	LINEAR	·	1.9 km	MPC · JPL
77028	2001 CO_{27}	—	February 2, 2001	Anderson Mesa	LONEOS	EUN	2.4 km	MPC · JPL
77029	2001 CG_{28}	—	February 2, 2001	Anderson Mesa	LONEOS	·	1.3 km	MPC · JPL
77030	2001 CO_{29}	—	February 2, 2001	Anderson Mesa	LONEOS	·	2.4 km	MPC · JPL
77031	2001 CT_{29}	—	February 2, 2001	Anderson Mesa	LONEOS	·	5.1 km	MPC · JPL
77032	2001 CA_{30}	—	February 2, 2001	Anderson Mesa	LONEOS	·	2.1 km	MPC · JPL
77033	2001 CJ_{30}	—	February 2, 2001	Anderson Mesa	LONEOS	·	2.0 km	MPC · JPL
77034	2001 CT_{31}	—	February 5, 2001	Socorro	LINEAR	PHO	3.3 km	MPC · JPL
77035	2001 CU_{33}	—	February 13, 2001	Socorro	LINEAR	MAR	2.4 km	MPC · JPL
77036	2001 CV_{35}	—	February 14, 2001	Višnjan Observatory	K. Korlević	·	1.4 km	MPC · JPL
77037	2001 CW_{35}	—	February 15, 2001	Oaxaca	Roe, J. M.	·	2.4 km	MPC · JPL
77038	2001 CD_{36}	—	February 15, 2001	Oizumi	T. Kobayashi	·	2.8 km	MPC · JPL
77039	2001 CK_{37}	—	February 15, 2001	Kleť	Kleť	·	1.7 km	MPC · JPL
77040	2001 CP_{40}	—	February 15, 2001	Socorro	LINEAR	·	2.9 km	MPC · JPL
77041	2001 CR_{40}	—	February 15, 2001	Socorro	LINEAR	EUN	2.6 km	MPC · JPL
77042	2001 CK_{41}	—	February 15, 2001	Socorro	LINEAR	·	3.0 km	MPC · JPL
77043	2001 CQ_{41}	—	February 15, 2001	Črni Vrh	Mikuž, H.	·	2.7 km	MPC · JPL
77044 Galera-Rosillo	2001 CE_{42}	Galera-Rosillo	February 15, 2001	La Palma	La Palma	MAR	2.2 km	MPC · JPL
77045	2001 CJ_{43}	—	February 15, 2001	Socorro	LINEAR	slow	7.6 km	MPC · JPL
77046	2001 CT_{43}	—	February 3, 2001	Socorro	LINEAR	PHO	3.3 km	MPC · JPL
77047	2001 CF_{44}	—	February 15, 2001	Socorro	LINEAR	·	3.6 km	MPC · JPL
77048	2001 CV_{47}	—	February 12, 2001	Anderson Mesa	LONEOS	·	2.0 km	MPC · JPL
77049	2001 CH_{48}	—	February 1, 2001	Cima Ekar	ADAS	·	1.4 km	MPC · JPL
77050	2001 DB	—	February 16, 2001	Črni Vrh	Mikuž, H.	·	1.8 km	MPC · JPL
77051	2001 DL	—	February 16, 2001	Desert Beaver	W. K. Y. Yeung	NYS	2.3 km	MPC · JPL
77052	2001 DN_{1}	—	February 16, 2001	Kitt Peak	Spacewatch	·	1.6 km	MPC · JPL
77053	2001 DR_{6}	—	February 16, 2001	Višnjan Observatory	K. Korlević	·	2.4 km	MPC · JPL
77054	2001 DG_{7}	—	February 16, 2001	Oizumi	T. Kobayashi	·	2.5 km	MPC · JPL
77055	2001 DD_{11}	—	February 17, 2001	Socorro	LINEAR	·	2.2 km	MPC · JPL
77056	2001 DD_{12}	—	February 17, 2001	Socorro	LINEAR	·	2.5 km	MPC · JPL
77057	2001 DG_{12}	—	February 17, 2001	Socorro	LINEAR	·	3.2 km	MPC · JPL
77058	2001 DM_{12}	—	February 17, 2001	Socorro	LINEAR	NYS	2.2 km	MPC · JPL
77059	2001 DS_{14}	—	February 20, 2001	Oaxaca	Roe, J. M.	·	2.7 km	MPC · JPL
77060	2001 DT_{15}	—	February 16, 2001	Socorro	LINEAR	·	1.3 km	MPC · JPL
77061	2001 DC_{17}	—	February 16, 2001	Socorro	LINEAR	·	3.5 km	MPC · JPL
77062	2001 DA_{19}	—	February 16, 2001	Socorro	LINEAR	ERI	3.9 km	MPC · JPL
77063	2001 DK_{19}	—	February 16, 2001	Socorro	LINEAR	V	1.2 km	MPC · JPL
77064	2001 DX_{19}	—	February 16, 2001	Socorro	LINEAR	·	4.7 km	MPC · JPL
77065	2001 DU_{20}	—	February 16, 2001	Socorro	LINEAR	·	3.2 km	MPC · JPL
77066	2001 DV_{20}	—	February 16, 2001	Socorro	LINEAR	·	4.4 km	MPC · JPL
77067	2001 DC_{21}	—	February 16, 2001	Socorro	LINEAR	V	1.6 km	MPC · JPL
77068	2001 DK_{21}	—	February 16, 2001	Socorro	LINEAR	·	4.5 km	MPC · JPL
77069	2001 DW_{21}	—	February 16, 2001	Socorro	LINEAR	·	4.6 km	MPC · JPL
77070	2001 DZ_{21}	—	February 16, 2001	Socorro	LINEAR	·	2.3 km	MPC · JPL
77071	2001 DE_{22}	—	February 16, 2001	Socorro	LINEAR	·	2.5 km	MPC · JPL
77072	2001 DH_{26}	—	February 17, 2001	Socorro	LINEAR	·	3.9 km	MPC · JPL
77073	2001 DE_{27}	—	February 17, 2001	Socorro	LINEAR	·	1.6 km	MPC · JPL
77074	2001 DF_{28}	—	February 17, 2001	Socorro	LINEAR	·	2.6 km	MPC · JPL
77075	2001 DA_{29}	—	February 17, 2001	Socorro	LINEAR	·	2.4 km	MPC · JPL
77076	2001 DU_{29}	—	February 17, 2001	Socorro	LINEAR	·	3.1 km	MPC · JPL
77077	2001 DZ_{29}	—	February 17, 2001	Socorro	LINEAR	·	3.2 km	MPC · JPL
77078	2001 DF_{30}	—	February 17, 2001	Socorro	LINEAR	·	1.4 km	MPC · JPL
77079	2001 DX_{30}	—	February 17, 2001	Socorro	LINEAR	·	2.3 km	MPC · JPL
77080	2001 DA_{32}	—	February 17, 2001	Socorro	LINEAR	·	2.7 km	MPC · JPL
77081	2001 DY_{32}	—	February 17, 2001	Socorro	LINEAR	V	1.5 km	MPC · JPL
77082	2001 DM_{33}	—	February 17, 2001	Socorro	LINEAR	NYS	3.0 km	MPC · JPL
77083	2001 DS_{34}	—	February 19, 2001	Socorro	LINEAR	SUL	4.6 km	MPC · JPL
77084	2001 DA_{35}	—	February 19, 2001	Socorro	LINEAR	·	1.5 km	MPC · JPL
77085	2001 DO_{35}	—	February 19, 2001	Socorro	LINEAR	V	1.3 km	MPC · JPL
77086	2001 DB_{36}	—	February 19, 2001	Socorro	LINEAR	·	1.8 km	MPC · JPL
77087	2001 DA_{37}	—	February 19, 2001	Socorro	LINEAR	·	2.9 km	MPC · JPL
77088	2001 DE_{41}	—	February 19, 2001	Socorro	LINEAR	V	1.4 km	MPC · JPL
77089	2001 DQ_{43}	—	February 19, 2001	Socorro	LINEAR	HYG	5.8 km	MPC · JPL
77090	2001 DY_{44}	—	February 19, 2001	Socorro	LINEAR	·	2.1 km	MPC · JPL
77091	2001 DH_{46}	—	February 19, 2001	Socorro	LINEAR	·	2.6 km	MPC · JPL
77092	2001 DA_{47}	—	February 19, 2001	Socorro	LINEAR	ERI	3.5 km	MPC · JPL
77093	2001 DS_{47}	—	February 20, 2001	Haleakala	NEAT	·	1.4 km	MPC · JPL
77094	2001 DZ_{48}	—	February 16, 2001	Socorro	LINEAR	V	1.3 km	MPC · JPL
77095	2001 DR_{50}	—	February 16, 2001	Socorro	LINEAR	·	1.6 km	MPC · JPL
77096	2001 DV_{50}	—	February 16, 2001	Socorro	LINEAR	·	1.8 km	MPC · JPL
77097	2001 DP_{52}	—	February 17, 2001	Socorro	LINEAR	·	1.5 km	MPC · JPL
77098	2001 DM_{55}	—	February 16, 2001	Kitt Peak	Spacewatch	·	2.1 km	MPC · JPL
77099	2001 DN_{61}	—	February 19, 2001	Socorro	LINEAR	·	1.8 km	MPC · JPL
77100	2001 DT_{63}	—	February 19, 2001	Socorro	LINEAR	NYS	3.0 km	MPC · JPL

== 77101–77200 ==
back to top

Designation			Discovery			Properties		Ref
Permanent	Provisional	Named after	Date	Site	Discoverer(s)	Category	Diam.	Ref
77101	2001 DZ_{64}	—	February 19, 2001	Socorro	LINEAR	·	1.9 km	MPC · JPL
77102	2001 DM_{66}	—	February 19, 2001	Socorro	LINEAR	·	1.7 km	MPC · JPL
77103	2001 DJ_{67}	—	February 19, 2001	Socorro	LINEAR	NYS	2.4 km	MPC · JPL
77104	2001 DV_{67}	—	February 19, 2001	Socorro	LINEAR	NYS	1.8 km	MPC · JPL
77105	2001 DG_{69}	—	February 19, 2001	Socorro	LINEAR	·	2.1 km	MPC · JPL
77106	2001 DH_{69}	—	February 19, 2001	Socorro	LINEAR	NYS	2.4 km	MPC · JPL
77107	2001 DK_{70}	—	February 19, 2001	Socorro	LINEAR	MAS	1.5 km	MPC · JPL
77108	2001 DP_{71}	—	February 19, 2001	Socorro	LINEAR	·	2.0 km	MPC · JPL
77109	2001 DE_{73}	—	February 19, 2001	Socorro	LINEAR	·	3.7 km	MPC · JPL
77110	2001 DG_{73}	—	February 19, 2001	Socorro	LINEAR	EUN	3.0 km	MPC · JPL
77111	2001 DT_{73}	—	February 19, 2001	Socorro	LINEAR	·	1.4 km	MPC · JPL
77112	2001 DK_{74}	—	February 19, 2001	Socorro	LINEAR	EUN	4.2 km	MPC · JPL
77113	2001 DU_{74}	—	February 19, 2001	Socorro	LINEAR	PHO	7.8 km	MPC · JPL
77114	2001 DJ_{75}	—	February 20, 2001	Socorro	LINEAR	·	1.3 km	MPC · JPL
77115	2001 DK_{75}	—	February 20, 2001	Socorro	LINEAR	·	1.9 km	MPC · JPL
77116	2001 DO_{75}	—	February 20, 2001	Socorro	LINEAR	NYS	1.5 km	MPC · JPL
77117	2001 DP_{76}	—	February 20, 2001	Socorro	LINEAR	·	2.5 km	MPC · JPL
77118	2001 DB_{79}	—	February 16, 2001	Socorro	LINEAR	EUN	2.6 km	MPC · JPL
77119	2001 DB_{81}	—	February 26, 2001	Oizumi	T. Kobayashi	·	3.6 km	MPC · JPL
77120	2001 DL_{81}	—	February 26, 2001	Oizumi	T. Kobayashi	·	3.1 km	MPC · JPL
77121	2001 DD_{88}	—	February 24, 2001	Haleakala	NEAT	·	2.5 km	MPC · JPL
77122	2001 DF_{88}	—	February 24, 2001	Haleakala	NEAT	·	2.3 km	MPC · JPL
77123	2001 DX_{88}	—	February 27, 2001	Kitt Peak	Spacewatch	·	2.3 km	MPC · JPL
77124	2001 DA_{89}	—	February 27, 2001	Kitt Peak	Spacewatch	MAS	1.2 km	MPC · JPL
77125	2001 DC_{89}	—	February 27, 2001	Kitt Peak	Spacewatch	·	4.1 km	MPC · JPL
77126	2001 DX_{90}	—	February 21, 2001	Kitt Peak	Spacewatch	MAS	1.6 km	MPC · JPL
77127	2001 DJ_{93}	—	February 19, 2001	Socorro	LINEAR	PHO	2.7 km	MPC · JPL
77128	2001 DA_{95}	—	February 19, 2001	Haleakala	NEAT	MAR	3.3 km	MPC · JPL
77129	2001 DX_{97}	—	February 17, 2001	Socorro	LINEAR	·	1.9 km	MPC · JPL
77130	2001 DG_{99}	—	February 17, 2001	Socorro	LINEAR	·	2.2 km	MPC · JPL
77131	2001 DK_{99}	—	February 17, 2001	Socorro	LINEAR	·	1.9 km	MPC · JPL
77132	2001 DL_{101}	—	February 16, 2001	Socorro	LINEAR	·	2.1 km	MPC · JPL
77133	2001 DM_{101}	—	February 16, 2001	Socorro	LINEAR	BRA	3.6 km	MPC · JPL
77134	2001 DX_{102}	—	February 16, 2001	Kitt Peak	Spacewatch	·	1.6 km	MPC · JPL
77135	2001 DT_{103}	—	February 16, 2001	Anderson Mesa	LONEOS	·	1.8 km	MPC · JPL
77136 Mendillo	2001 DP_{106}	Mendillo	February 26, 2001	Cima Ekar	ADAS	V	1.4 km	MPC · JPL
77137	2001 DQ_{107}	—	February 20, 2001	Kitt Peak	Spacewatch	·	3.4 km	MPC · JPL
77138 Puiching	2001 EN	Puiching	March 2, 2001	Desert Beaver	W. K. Y. Yeung	NYS	2.6 km	MPC · JPL
77139	2001 EY	—	March 1, 2001	Socorro	LINEAR	·	6.5 km	MPC · JPL
77140	2001 EC_{1}	—	March 1, 2001	Socorro	LINEAR	·	1.7 km	MPC · JPL
77141	2001 ES_{1}	—	March 1, 2001	Socorro	LINEAR	·	1.5 km	MPC · JPL
77142	2001 EC_{2}	—	March 1, 2001	Socorro	LINEAR	·	2.9 km	MPC · JPL
77143	2001 EN_{3}	—	March 2, 2001	Anderson Mesa	LONEOS	·	1.2 km	MPC · JPL
77144	2001 EC_{5}	—	March 2, 2001	Anderson Mesa	LONEOS	·	3.8 km	MPC · JPL
77145	2001 ES_{5}	—	March 2, 2001	Anderson Mesa	LONEOS	NYS	2.5 km	MPC · JPL
77146	2001 EC_{6}	—	March 2, 2001	Anderson Mesa	LONEOS	·	2.2 km	MPC · JPL
77147	2001 EV_{6}	—	March 2, 2001	Anderson Mesa	LONEOS	(2076)	1.8 km	MPC · JPL
77148	2001 EF_{7}	—	March 2, 2001	Anderson Mesa	LONEOS	·	2.4 km	MPC · JPL
77149	2001 ER_{7}	—	March 2, 2001	Anderson Mesa	LONEOS	·	3.1 km	MPC · JPL
77150	2001 EL_{8}	—	March 2, 2001	Anderson Mesa	LONEOS	·	3.1 km	MPC · JPL
77151	2001 ER_{8}	—	March 2, 2001	Anderson Mesa	LONEOS	·	3.4 km	MPC · JPL
77152	2001 EX_{8}	—	March 2, 2001	Anderson Mesa	LONEOS	NYS	2.4 km	MPC · JPL
77153	2001 EZ_{8}	—	March 2, 2001	Anderson Mesa	LONEOS	NYS	1.9 km	MPC · JPL
77154	2001 EO_{9}	—	March 2, 2001	Anderson Mesa	LONEOS	·	1.1 km	MPC · JPL
77155	2001 ES_{10}	—	March 2, 2001	Desert Beaver	W. K. Y. Yeung	·	7.1 km	MPC · JPL
77156	2001 EE_{11}	—	March 2, 2001	Haleakala	NEAT	·	2.2 km	MPC · JPL
77157	2001 EJ_{11}	—	March 2, 2001	Haleakala	NEAT	·	3.4 km	MPC · JPL
77158	2001 EN_{15}	—	March 15, 2001	Prescott	P. G. Comba	LIX	8.7 km	MPC · JPL
77159	2001 ED_{16}	—	March 15, 2001	Marxuquera	Marxuquera	(2076)	3.9 km	MPC · JPL
77160	2001 EK_{18}	—	March 13, 2001	Haleakala	NEAT	·	2.4 km	MPC · JPL
77161	2001 EY_{18}	—	March 14, 2001	Haleakala	NEAT	·	1.3 km	MPC · JPL
77162	2001 EL_{19}	—	March 15, 2001	Anderson Mesa	LONEOS	·	1.7 km	MPC · JPL
77163	2001 EM_{19}	—	March 15, 2001	Anderson Mesa	LONEOS	fast	2.9 km	MPC · JPL
77164	2001 ER_{19}	—	March 15, 2001	Anderson Mesa	LONEOS	EUN	2.3 km	MPC · JPL
77165	2001 ES_{19}	—	March 15, 2001	Anderson Mesa	LONEOS	·	5.9 km	MPC · JPL
77166 McKaye	2001 EV_{19}	McKaye	March 15, 2001	Needville	W. G. Dillon, J. Dellinger	·	4.0 km	MPC · JPL
77167	2001 EB_{20}	—	March 15, 2001	Anderson Mesa	LONEOS	·	4.2 km	MPC · JPL
77168	2001 EK_{22}	—	March 15, 2001	Anderson Mesa	LONEOS	V	1.6 km	MPC · JPL
77169	2001 ER_{22}	—	March 15, 2001	Kitt Peak	Spacewatch	·	2.4 km	MPC · JPL
77170	2001 EK_{23}	—	March 15, 2001	Haleakala	NEAT	·	1.6 km	MPC · JPL
77171	2001 EN_{24}	—	March 4, 2001	Socorro	LINEAR	·	2.8 km	MPC · JPL
77172	2001 EF_{25}	—	March 14, 2001	Anderson Mesa	LONEOS	EUN	3.1 km	MPC · JPL
77173	2001 ED_{26}	—	March 2, 2001	Anderson Mesa	LONEOS	·	2.6 km	MPC · JPL
77174	2001 FW	—	March 17, 2001	Socorro	LINEAR	·	1.5 km	MPC · JPL
77175	2001 FP_{1}	—	March 19, 2001	Reedy Creek	J. Broughton	NYS	2.3 km	MPC · JPL
77176	2001 FU_{1}	—	March 16, 2001	Socorro	LINEAR	·	1.6 km	MPC · JPL
77177	2001 FD_{2}	—	March 16, 2001	Socorro	LINEAR	·	3.1 km	MPC · JPL
77178	2001 FH_{3}	—	March 18, 2001	Socorro	LINEAR	·	2.6 km	MPC · JPL
77179	2001 FV_{4}	—	March 19, 2001	Prescott	P. G. Comba	·	5.3 km	MPC · JPL
77180	2001 FA_{5}	—	March 19, 2001	Socorro	LINEAR	NYS	3.2 km	MPC · JPL
77181	2001 FL_{6}	—	March 16, 2001	Needville	L. Casady, A. Cruz	·	2.3 km	MPC · JPL
77182	2001 FM_{8}	—	March 18, 2001	Socorro	LINEAR	·	2.0 km	MPC · JPL
77183	2001 FS_{8}	—	March 18, 2001	Socorro	LINEAR	·	3.4 km	MPC · JPL
77184	2001 FD_{9}	—	March 20, 2001	Haleakala	NEAT	ADE	4.6 km	MPC · JPL
77185 Cherryh	2001 FE_{9}	Cherryh	March 20, 2001	Needville	Wells, D., Cruz, A.	·	4.0 km	MPC · JPL
77186	2001 FS_{9}	—	March 20, 2001	Reedy Creek	J. Broughton	V	1.8 km	MPC · JPL
77187	2001 FY_{9}	—	March 22, 2001	Kvistaberg	Uppsala-DLR Asteroid Survey	·	1.6 km	MPC · JPL
77188	2001 FZ_{9}	—	March 22, 2001	Kvistaberg	Uppsala-DLR Asteroid Survey	MAR	2.9 km	MPC · JPL
77189	2001 FM_{10}	—	March 19, 2001	Anderson Mesa	LONEOS	·	1.5 km	MPC · JPL
77190	2001 FP_{10}	—	March 19, 2001	Anderson Mesa	LONEOS	·	3.2 km	MPC · JPL
77191	2001 FE_{11}	—	March 19, 2001	Anderson Mesa	LONEOS	V	1.5 km	MPC · JPL
77192	2001 FU_{12}	—	March 19, 2001	Anderson Mesa	LONEOS	·	3.7 km	MPC · JPL
77193	2001 FD_{14}	—	March 19, 2001	Anderson Mesa	LONEOS	·	1.2 km	MPC · JPL
77194	2001 FH_{14}	—	March 19, 2001	Anderson Mesa	LONEOS	·	4.1 km	MPC · JPL
77195	2001 FB_{16}	—	March 19, 2001	Anderson Mesa	LONEOS	·	5.6 km	MPC · JPL
77196	2001 FT_{16}	—	March 19, 2001	Anderson Mesa	LONEOS	·	4.5 km	MPC · JPL
77197	2001 FB_{17}	—	March 19, 2001	Anderson Mesa	LONEOS	·	2.0 km	MPC · JPL
77198	2001 FK_{17}	—	March 19, 2001	Anderson Mesa	LONEOS	·	3.3 km	MPC · JPL
77199	2001 FH_{18}	—	March 19, 2001	Anderson Mesa	LONEOS	·	2.5 km	MPC · JPL
77200	2001 FY_{18}	—	March 19, 2001	Anderson Mesa	LONEOS	·	2.5 km	MPC · JPL

== 77201–77300 ==
back to top

Designation			Discovery			Properties		Ref
Permanent	Provisional	Named after	Date	Site	Discoverer(s)	Category	Diam.	Ref
77201	2001 FR_{19}	—	March 19, 2001	Anderson Mesa	LONEOS	·	2.4 km	MPC · JPL
77202	2001 FX_{19}	—	March 19, 2001	Anderson Mesa	LONEOS	HYG	8.4 km	MPC · JPL
77203	2001 FL_{20}	—	March 19, 2001	Anderson Mesa	LONEOS	·	2.0 km	MPC · JPL
77204	2001 FW_{20}	—	March 19, 2001	Anderson Mesa	LONEOS	·	1.9 km	MPC · JPL
77205	2001 FX_{20}	—	March 19, 2001	Anderson Mesa	LONEOS	·	2.9 km	MPC · JPL
77206	2001 FZ_{20}	—	March 19, 2001	Anderson Mesa	LONEOS	·	1.8 km	MPC · JPL
77207	2001 FE_{21}	—	March 21, 2001	Anderson Mesa	LONEOS	·	6.5 km	MPC · JPL
77208	2001 FG_{21}	—	March 21, 2001	Anderson Mesa	LONEOS	EUN	2.9 km	MPC · JPL
77209	2001 FH_{21}	—	March 21, 2001	Anderson Mesa	LONEOS	·	4.5 km	MPC · JPL
77210	2001 FQ_{21}	—	March 21, 2001	Anderson Mesa	LONEOS	(2076)	1.5 km	MPC · JPL
77211	2001 FT_{21}	—	March 21, 2001	Anderson Mesa	LONEOS	·	4.4 km	MPC · JPL
77212	2001 FT_{22}	—	March 21, 2001	Anderson Mesa	LONEOS	·	2.0 km	MPC · JPL
77213	2001 FL_{23}	—	March 21, 2001	Anderson Mesa	LONEOS	·	1.6 km	MPC · JPL
77214	2001 FM_{23}	—	March 21, 2001	Anderson Mesa	LONEOS	V	1.6 km	MPC · JPL
77215	2001 FU_{23}	—	March 21, 2001	Anderson Mesa	LONEOS	·	1.6 km	MPC · JPL
77216	2001 FO_{24}	—	March 17, 2001	Socorro	LINEAR	slow?	6.5 km	MPC · JPL
77217	2001 FS_{26}	—	March 18, 2001	Socorro	LINEAR	·	1.4 km	MPC · JPL
77218	2001 FU_{26}	—	March 18, 2001	Socorro	LINEAR	(5)	2.2 km	MPC · JPL
77219	2001 FX_{26}	—	March 18, 2001	Socorro	LINEAR	·	1.8 km	MPC · JPL
77220	2001 FA_{28}	—	March 19, 2001	Socorro	LINEAR	·	3.4 km	MPC · JPL
77221	2001 FE_{28}	—	March 19, 2001	Socorro	LINEAR	·	3.3 km	MPC · JPL
77222	2001 FA_{29}	—	March 19, 2001	Socorro	LINEAR	·	4.2 km	MPC · JPL
77223	2001 FP_{29}	—	March 18, 2001	Haleakala	NEAT	RAF	2.0 km	MPC · JPL
77224	2001 FL_{32}	—	March 22, 2001	Kitt Peak	Spacewatch	·	2.4 km	MPC · JPL
77225	2001 FZ_{33}	—	March 18, 2001	Socorro	LINEAR	·	3.9 km	MPC · JPL
77226	2001 FE_{34}	—	March 18, 2001	Socorro	LINEAR	NYS	2.3 km	MPC · JPL
77227	2001 FH_{34}	—	March 18, 2001	Socorro	LINEAR	V	1.2 km	MPC · JPL
77228	2001 FF_{35}	—	March 18, 2001	Socorro	LINEAR	·	2.5 km	MPC · JPL
77229	2001 FN_{35}	—	March 18, 2001	Socorro	LINEAR	·	2.4 km	MPC · JPL
77230	2001 FC_{36}	—	March 18, 2001	Socorro	LINEAR	·	2.5 km	MPC · JPL
77231	2001 FL_{36}	—	March 18, 2001	Socorro	LINEAR	NYS	2.2 km	MPC · JPL
77232	2001 FA_{38}	—	March 18, 2001	Socorro	LINEAR	·	4.0 km	MPC · JPL
77233	2001 FD_{38}	—	March 18, 2001	Socorro	LINEAR	·	1.7 km	MPC · JPL
77234	2001 FY_{38}	—	March 18, 2001	Socorro	LINEAR	·	2.2 km	MPC · JPL
77235	2001 FA_{39}	—	March 18, 2001	Socorro	LINEAR	V	1.6 km	MPC · JPL
77236	2001 FJ_{39}	—	March 18, 2001	Socorro	LINEAR	·	2.0 km	MPC · JPL
77237	2001 FS_{39}	—	March 18, 2001	Socorro	LINEAR	NYS	2.2 km	MPC · JPL
77238	2001 FB_{40}	—	March 18, 2001	Socorro	LINEAR	V	1.7 km	MPC · JPL
77239	2001 FZ_{40}	—	March 18, 2001	Socorro	LINEAR	NYS	2.7 km	MPC · JPL
77240	2001 FD_{41}	—	March 18, 2001	Socorro	LINEAR	·	3.6 km	MPC · JPL
77241	2001 FO_{41}	—	March 18, 2001	Socorro	LINEAR	·	1.5 km	MPC · JPL
77242	2001 FC_{42}	—	March 18, 2001	Socorro	LINEAR	·	4.3 km	MPC · JPL
77243	2001 FD_{42}	—	March 18, 2001	Socorro	LINEAR	·	2.8 km	MPC · JPL
77244	2001 FZ_{42}	—	March 18, 2001	Socorro	LINEAR	·	1.9 km	MPC · JPL
77245	2001 FN_{43}	—	March 18, 2001	Socorro	LINEAR	MAS	1.3 km	MPC · JPL
77246	2001 FY_{43}	—	March 18, 2001	Socorro	LINEAR	·	4.3 km	MPC · JPL
77247	2001 FC_{44}	—	March 18, 2001	Socorro	LINEAR	·	1.8 km	MPC · JPL
77248	2001 FD_{44}	—	March 18, 2001	Socorro	LINEAR	·	2.4 km	MPC · JPL
77249	2001 FP_{45}	—	March 18, 2001	Socorro	LINEAR	·	2.4 km	MPC · JPL
77250	2001 FQ_{45}	—	March 18, 2001	Socorro	LINEAR	·	3.3 km	MPC · JPL
77251	2001 FY_{45}	—	March 18, 2001	Socorro	LINEAR	NYS	2.3 km	MPC · JPL
77252	2001 FZ_{45}	—	March 18, 2001	Socorro	LINEAR	·	3.0 km	MPC · JPL
77253	2001 FE_{46}	—	March 18, 2001	Socorro	LINEAR	·	1.7 km	MPC · JPL
77254	2001 FF_{46}	—	March 18, 2001	Socorro	LINEAR	MAR	3.1 km	MPC · JPL
77255	2001 FY_{46}	—	March 18, 2001	Socorro	LINEAR	·	3.1 km	MPC · JPL
77256	2001 FD_{47}	—	March 18, 2001	Socorro	LINEAR	V	1.4 km	MPC · JPL
77257	2001 FA_{48}	—	March 18, 2001	Socorro	LINEAR	NYS	2.7 km	MPC · JPL
77258	2001 FH_{48}	—	March 18, 2001	Socorro	LINEAR	·	3.0 km	MPC · JPL
77259	2001 FX_{48}	—	March 18, 2001	Socorro	LINEAR	·	2.8 km	MPC · JPL
77260	2001 FA_{49}	—	March 18, 2001	Socorro	LINEAR	·	2.7 km	MPC · JPL
77261	2001 FR_{49}	—	March 18, 2001	Socorro	LINEAR	·	2.8 km	MPC · JPL
77262	2001 FS_{49}	—	March 18, 2001	Socorro	LINEAR	·	1.7 km	MPC · JPL
77263	2001 FJ_{50}	—	March 18, 2001	Socorro	LINEAR	·	2.8 km	MPC · JPL
77264	2001 FX_{50}	—	March 18, 2001	Socorro	LINEAR	·	1.7 km	MPC · JPL
77265	2001 FB_{51}	—	March 18, 2001	Socorro	LINEAR	·	3.4 km	MPC · JPL
77266	2001 FX_{51}	—	March 18, 2001	Socorro	LINEAR	·	2.3 km	MPC · JPL
77267	2001 FH_{52}	—	March 18, 2001	Socorro	LINEAR	·	2.7 km	MPC · JPL
77268	2001 FO_{52}	—	March 18, 2001	Socorro	LINEAR	·	2.8 km	MPC · JPL
77269	2001 FX_{52}	—	March 18, 2001	Socorro	LINEAR	·	1.8 km	MPC · JPL
77270	2001 FD_{53}	—	March 18, 2001	Socorro	LINEAR	·	2.5 km	MPC · JPL
77271	2001 FY_{53}	—	March 18, 2001	Socorro	LINEAR	V · fast	2.6 km	MPC · JPL
77272	2001 FV_{54}	—	March 19, 2001	Socorro	LINEAR	·	2.0 km	MPC · JPL
77273	2001 FO_{55}	—	March 21, 2001	Socorro	LINEAR	·	4.6 km	MPC · JPL
77274	2001 FP_{55}	—	March 21, 2001	Socorro	LINEAR	·	2.8 km	MPC · JPL
77275	2001 FO_{57}	—	March 19, 2001	Socorro	LINEAR	·	2.8 km	MPC · JPL
77276	2001 FX_{57}	—	March 21, 2001	Anderson Mesa	LONEOS	·	2.5 km	MPC · JPL
77277	2001 FV_{59}	—	March 19, 2001	Socorro	LINEAR	SUL	3.6 km	MPC · JPL
77278	2001 FL_{61}	—	March 19, 2001	Socorro	LINEAR	SUL	5.0 km	MPC · JPL
77279	2001 FM_{61}	—	March 19, 2001	Socorro	LINEAR	·	2.8 km	MPC · JPL
77280	2001 FC_{62}	—	March 19, 2001	Socorro	LINEAR	·	2.4 km	MPC · JPL
77281	2001 FO_{63}	—	March 19, 2001	Socorro	LINEAR	·	2.0 km	MPC · JPL
77282	2001 FW_{63}	—	March 19, 2001	Socorro	LINEAR	·	4.2 km	MPC · JPL
77283	2001 FR_{64}	—	March 19, 2001	Socorro	LINEAR	·	4.2 km	MPC · JPL
77284	2001 FD_{65}	—	March 19, 2001	Socorro	LINEAR	·	2.4 km	MPC · JPL
77285	2001 FN_{65}	—	March 19, 2001	Socorro	LINEAR	AEO	2.9 km	MPC · JPL
77286	2001 FR_{65}	—	March 19, 2001	Socorro	LINEAR	·	2.0 km	MPC · JPL
77287	2001 FA_{66}	—	March 19, 2001	Socorro	LINEAR	·	2.8 km	MPC · JPL
77288	2001 FN_{66}	—	March 19, 2001	Socorro	LINEAR	·	2.2 km	MPC · JPL
77289	2001 FX_{66}	—	March 19, 2001	Socorro	LINEAR	·	3.2 km	MPC · JPL
77290	2001 FU_{69}	—	March 19, 2001	Socorro	LINEAR	V	1.7 km	MPC · JPL
77291	2001 FL_{71}	—	March 19, 2001	Socorro	LINEAR	·	3.3 km	MPC · JPL
77292	2001 FN_{71}	—	March 19, 2001	Socorro	LINEAR	·	2.0 km	MPC · JPL
77293	2001 FR_{71}	—	March 19, 2001	Socorro	LINEAR	·	3.0 km	MPC · JPL
77294	2001 FV_{71}	—	March 19, 2001	Socorro	LINEAR	·	3.2 km	MPC · JPL
77295	2001 FZ_{71}	—	March 19, 2001	Socorro	LINEAR	NYS	2.2 km	MPC · JPL
77296	2001 FW_{72}	—	March 19, 2001	Socorro	LINEAR	·	1.8 km	MPC · JPL
77297	2001 FM_{73}	—	March 19, 2001	Socorro	LINEAR	NYS	2.9 km	MPC · JPL
77298	2001 FP_{73}	—	March 19, 2001	Socorro	LINEAR	·	2.5 km	MPC · JPL
77299	2001 FV_{73}	—	March 19, 2001	Socorro	LINEAR	·	2.5 km	MPC · JPL
77300	2001 FD_{76}	—	March 19, 2001	Socorro	LINEAR	·	2.6 km	MPC · JPL

== 77301–77400 ==
back to top

Designation			Discovery			Properties		Ref
Permanent	Provisional	Named after	Date	Site	Discoverer(s)	Category	Diam.	Ref
77301	2001 FL_{77}	—	March 19, 2001	Socorro	LINEAR	·	2.8 km	MPC · JPL
77302	2001 FO_{77}	—	March 19, 2001	Socorro	LINEAR	(5)	3.6 km	MPC · JPL
77303	2001 FG_{78}	—	March 19, 2001	Socorro	LINEAR	·	4.2 km	MPC · JPL
77304	2001 FP_{78}	—	March 19, 2001	Socorro	LINEAR	ADE	6.2 km	MPC · JPL
77305	2001 FR_{78}	—	March 19, 2001	Socorro	LINEAR	·	2.8 km	MPC · JPL
77306	2001 FH_{79}	—	March 19, 2001	Socorro	LINEAR	·	2.2 km	MPC · JPL
77307	2001 FJ_{79}	—	March 19, 2001	Socorro	LINEAR	·	2.8 km	MPC · JPL
77308	2001 FR_{79}	—	March 21, 2001	Socorro	LINEAR	V	1.7 km	MPC · JPL
77309	2001 FU_{79}	—	March 21, 2001	Socorro	LINEAR	GEF	3.3 km	MPC · JPL
77310	2001 FD_{81}	—	March 23, 2001	Socorro	LINEAR	·	3.0 km	MPC · JPL
77311	2001 FL_{81}	—	March 23, 2001	Socorro	LINEAR	·	1.7 km	MPC · JPL
77312	2001 FO_{81}	—	March 23, 2001	Socorro	LINEAR	·	2.2 km	MPC · JPL
77313	2001 FY_{81}	—	March 23, 2001	Socorro	LINEAR	RAF	2.2 km	MPC · JPL
77314	2001 FE_{82}	—	March 23, 2001	Socorro	LINEAR	·	2.0 km	MPC · JPL
77315	2001 FL_{82}	—	March 23, 2001	Socorro	LINEAR	·	2.4 km	MPC · JPL
77316	2001 FY_{82}	—	March 23, 2001	Socorro	LINEAR	V	1.3 km	MPC · JPL
77317	2001 FJ_{83}	—	March 24, 2001	Socorro	LINEAR	·	2.2 km	MPC · JPL
77318 Danieltsui	2001 FL_{86}	Danieltsui	March 27, 2001	Desert Beaver	W. K. Y. Yeung	·	1.8 km	MPC · JPL
77319	2001 FJ_{87}	—	March 21, 2001	Anderson Mesa	LONEOS	EOS	4.1 km	MPC · JPL
77320	2001 FO_{87}	—	March 21, 2001	Anderson Mesa	LONEOS	·	2.1 km	MPC · JPL
77321	2001 FS_{87}	—	March 21, 2001	Anderson Mesa	LONEOS	·	2.4 km	MPC · JPL
77322	2001 FO_{90}	—	March 26, 2001	Socorro	LINEAR	·	1.8 km	MPC · JPL
77323	2001 FU_{90}	—	March 26, 2001	Socorro	LINEAR	NYS	2.5 km	MPC · JPL
77324	2001 FY_{90}	—	March 26, 2001	Socorro	LINEAR	·	2.5 km	MPC · JPL
77325	2001 FG_{91}	—	March 26, 2001	Socorro	LINEAR	·	5.0 km	MPC · JPL
77326	2001 FV_{92}	—	March 16, 2001	Socorro	LINEAR	·	3.1 km	MPC · JPL
77327	2001 FX_{92}	—	March 16, 2001	Socorro	LINEAR	·	2.1 km	MPC · JPL
77328	2001 FZ_{92}	—	March 16, 2001	Socorro	LINEAR	·	2.5 km	MPC · JPL
77329	2001 FL_{93}	—	March 16, 2001	Socorro	LINEAR	·	1.8 km	MPC · JPL
77330	2001 FB_{94}	—	March 16, 2001	Socorro	LINEAR	·	3.4 km	MPC · JPL
77331	2001 FH_{94}	—	March 16, 2001	Socorro	LINEAR	EOS	5.0 km	MPC · JPL
77332	2001 FH_{95}	—	March 16, 2001	Socorro	LINEAR	·	1.7 km	MPC · JPL
77333	2001 FL_{96}	—	March 16, 2001	Socorro	LINEAR	·	4.1 km	MPC · JPL
77334	2001 FR_{96}	—	March 16, 2001	Socorro	LINEAR	·	3.2 km	MPC · JPL
77335	2001 FU_{96}	—	March 16, 2001	Socorro	LINEAR	·	2.6 km	MPC · JPL
77336	2001 FW_{96}	—	March 16, 2001	Socorro	LINEAR	V	1.8 km	MPC · JPL
77337	2001 FX_{97}	—	March 16, 2001	Socorro	LINEAR	·	2.4 km	MPC · JPL
77338	2001 FS_{98}	—	March 16, 2001	Socorro	LINEAR	·	8.9 km	MPC · JPL
77339	2001 FT_{98}	—	March 16, 2001	Socorro	LINEAR	·	3.4 km	MPC · JPL
77340	2001 FL_{101}	—	March 17, 2001	Socorro	LINEAR	·	5.3 km	MPC · JPL
77341	2001 FO_{101}	—	March 17, 2001	Socorro	LINEAR	V	1.6 km	MPC · JPL
77342	2001 FH_{102}	—	March 17, 2001	Socorro	LINEAR	·	2.2 km	MPC · JPL
77343	2001 FN_{102}	—	March 17, 2001	Kitt Peak	Spacewatch	·	1.7 km	MPC · JPL
77344	2001 FS_{103}	—	March 18, 2001	Socorro	LINEAR	V	1.9 km	MPC · JPL
77345	2001 FH_{104}	—	March 18, 2001	Anderson Mesa	LONEOS	·	2.5 km	MPC · JPL
77346	2001 FC_{108}	—	March 18, 2001	Kitt Peak	Spacewatch	·	3.9 km	MPC · JPL
77347	2001 FB_{109}	—	March 18, 2001	Socorro	LINEAR	·	6.5 km	MPC · JPL
77348	2001 FG_{110}	—	March 18, 2001	Socorro	LINEAR	·	2.7 km	MPC · JPL
77349	2001 FG_{114}	—	March 19, 2001	Anderson Mesa	LONEOS	·	3.9 km	MPC · JPL
77350	2001 FN_{118}	—	March 20, 2001	Haleakala	NEAT	·	4.3 km	MPC · JPL
77351	2001 FT_{119}	—	March 27, 2001	Kitt Peak	Spacewatch	·	3.6 km	MPC · JPL
77352	2001 FV_{119}	—	March 27, 2001	Kitt Peak	Spacewatch	EUN	3.5 km	MPC · JPL
77353	2001 FE_{121}	—	March 26, 2001	Socorro	LINEAR	·	3.1 km	MPC · JPL
77354	2001 FM_{121}	—	March 23, 2001	Haleakala	NEAT	·	3.7 km	MPC · JPL
77355	2001 FE_{123}	—	March 23, 2001	Anderson Mesa	LONEOS	·	3.8 km	MPC · JPL
77356	2001 FS_{123}	—	March 23, 2001	Anderson Mesa	LONEOS	·	4.2 km	MPC · JPL
77357	2001 FW_{125}	—	March 26, 2001	Kitt Peak	Spacewatch	·	3.1 km	MPC · JPL
77358	2001 FT_{126}	—	March 26, 2001	Socorro	LINEAR	·	2.3 km	MPC · JPL
77359	2001 FU_{128}	—	March 26, 2001	Socorro	LINEAR	·	2.6 km	MPC · JPL
77360	2001 FX_{128}	—	March 26, 2001	Socorro	LINEAR	·	3.7 km	MPC · JPL
77361	2001 FP_{129}	—	March 26, 2001	Socorro	LINEAR	·	7.3 km	MPC · JPL
77362	2001 FB_{130}	—	March 29, 2001	Socorro	LINEAR	MAS	2.1 km	MPC · JPL
77363	2001 FO_{130}	—	March 31, 2001	Desert Beaver	W. K. Y. Yeung	·	2.8 km	MPC · JPL
77364	2001 FQ_{130}	—	March 31, 2001	Desert Beaver	W. K. Y. Yeung	·	6.1 km	MPC · JPL
77365	2001 FP_{131}	—	March 20, 2001	Kitt Peak	Spacewatch	·	3.6 km	MPC · JPL
77366	2001 FQ_{133}	—	March 20, 2001	Haleakala	NEAT	·	2.4 km	MPC · JPL
77367	2001 FC_{134}	—	March 20, 2001	Haleakala	NEAT	·	2.3 km	MPC · JPL
77368	2001 FL_{134}	—	March 20, 2001	Haleakala	NEAT	HNS	3.0 km	MPC · JPL
77369	2001 FT_{134}	—	March 21, 2001	Anderson Mesa	LONEOS	·	3.2 km	MPC · JPL
77370	2001 FB_{135}	—	March 21, 2001	Anderson Mesa	LONEOS	·	7.4 km	MPC · JPL
77371	2001 FF_{136}	—	March 21, 2001	Anderson Mesa	LONEOS	·	5.4 km	MPC · JPL
77372	2001 FL_{136}	—	March 21, 2001	Anderson Mesa	LONEOS	·	4.7 km	MPC · JPL
77373	2001 FN_{136}	—	March 21, 2001	Anderson Mesa	LONEOS	·	6.8 km	MPC · JPL
77374	2001 FT_{136}	—	March 21, 2001	Anderson Mesa	LONEOS	·	5.7 km	MPC · JPL
77375	2001 FV_{136}	—	March 21, 2001	Anderson Mesa	LONEOS	·	9.6 km	MPC · JPL
77376	2001 FC_{137}	—	March 21, 2001	Haleakala	NEAT	·	4.6 km	MPC · JPL
77377	2001 FJ_{137}	—	March 21, 2001	Anderson Mesa	LONEOS	·	2.5 km	MPC · JPL
77378	2001 FE_{138}	—	March 21, 2001	Anderson Mesa	LONEOS	V	1.3 km	MPC · JPL
77379	2001 FU_{139}	—	March 21, 2001	Haleakala	NEAT	·	7.3 km	MPC · JPL
77380	2001 FP_{140}	—	March 21, 2001	Haleakala	NEAT	·	1.5 km	MPC · JPL
77381	2001 FE_{141}	—	March 23, 2001	Socorro	LINEAR	·	3.6 km	MPC · JPL
77382	2001 FZ_{143}	—	March 23, 2001	Anderson Mesa	LONEOS	·	3.0 km	MPC · JPL
77383	2001 FG_{144}	—	March 23, 2001	Anderson Mesa	LONEOS	(18466)	2.6 km	MPC · JPL
77384	2001 FZ_{144}	—	March 23, 2001	Haleakala	NEAT	·	4.3 km	MPC · JPL
77385	2001 FM_{148}	—	March 24, 2001	Anderson Mesa	LONEOS	·	3.5 km	MPC · JPL
77386	2001 FV_{148}	—	March 24, 2001	Anderson Mesa	LONEOS	·	2.7 km	MPC · JPL
77387	2001 FY_{148}	—	March 24, 2001	Socorro	LINEAR	EOS	3.9 km	MPC · JPL
77388	2001 FA_{150}	—	March 24, 2001	Anderson Mesa	LONEOS	DOR	6.9 km	MPC · JPL
77389	2001 FW_{150}	—	March 24, 2001	Anderson Mesa	LONEOS	·	1.9 km	MPC · JPL
77390	2001 FA_{151}	—	March 24, 2001	Socorro	LINEAR	·	5.7 km	MPC · JPL
77391	2001 FZ_{151}	—	March 24, 2001	Haleakala	NEAT	·	2.9 km	MPC · JPL
77392	2001 FV_{152}	—	March 26, 2001	Socorro	LINEAR	RAF	3.1 km	MPC · JPL
77393	2001 FK_{155}	—	March 26, 2001	Socorro	LINEAR	·	1.4 km	MPC · JPL
77394	2001 FB_{159}	—	March 29, 2001	Anderson Mesa	LONEOS	·	1.5 km	MPC · JPL
77395	2001 FG_{159}	—	March 29, 2001	Anderson Mesa	LONEOS	·	7.7 km	MPC · JPL
77396	2001 FM_{159}	—	March 29, 2001	Anderson Mesa	LONEOS	(12739)	3.9 km	MPC · JPL
77397	2001 FQ_{160}	—	March 29, 2001	Anderson Mesa	LONEOS	·	8.5 km	MPC · JPL
77398	2001 FT_{160}	—	March 29, 2001	Socorro	LINEAR	·	2.6 km	MPC · JPL
77399	2001 FV_{160}	—	March 29, 2001	Socorro	LINEAR	·	11 km	MPC · JPL
77400	2001 FO_{162}	—	March 31, 2001	Socorro	LINEAR	·	2.3 km	MPC · JPL

== 77401–77500 ==
back to top

Designation			Discovery			Properties		Ref
Permanent	Provisional	Named after	Date	Site	Discoverer(s)	Category	Diam.	Ref
77401	2001 FT_{163}	—	March 18, 2001	Anderson Mesa	LONEOS	·	5.5 km	MPC · JPL
77402	2001 FK_{168}	—	March 22, 2001	Kitt Peak	Spacewatch	·	2.7 km	MPC · JPL
77403	2001 FB_{169}	—	March 23, 2001	Anderson Mesa	LONEOS	·	7.4 km	MPC · JPL
77404	2001 FE_{169}	—	March 23, 2001	Anderson Mesa	LONEOS	·	2.6 km	MPC · JPL
77405	2001 FH_{169}	—	March 23, 2001	Anderson Mesa	LONEOS	V	1.4 km	MPC · JPL
77406	2001 FZ_{169}	—	March 24, 2001	Anderson Mesa	LONEOS	·	2.3 km	MPC · JPL
77407	2001 FN_{170}	—	March 24, 2001	Socorro	LINEAR	·	2.7 km	MPC · JPL
77408	2001 FY_{171}	—	March 24, 2001	Haleakala	NEAT	·	3.6 km	MPC · JPL
77409	2001 FD_{172}	—	March 24, 2001	Haleakala	NEAT	PHO	3.3 km	MPC · JPL
77410	2001 FE_{172}	—	March 24, 2001	Haleakala	NEAT	·	3.7 km	MPC · JPL
77411	2001 FX_{172}	—	March 16, 2001	Socorro	LINEAR	·	5.6 km	MPC · JPL
77412	2001 FH_{175}	—	March 31, 2001	Socorro	LINEAR	·	3.8 km	MPC · JPL
77413	2001 FO_{175}	—	March 31, 2001	Socorro	LINEAR	·	3.5 km	MPC · JPL
77414	2001 FV_{175}	—	March 16, 2001	Socorro	LINEAR	·	2.8 km	MPC · JPL
77415	2001 FS_{176}	—	March 16, 2001	Socorro	LINEAR	EOS	5.6 km	MPC · JPL
77416	2001 FP_{178}	—	March 20, 2001	Anderson Mesa	LONEOS	PHO	1.9 km	MPC · JPL
77417	2001 FT_{180}	—	March 20, 2001	Anderson Mesa	LONEOS	EOS	4.7 km	MPC · JPL
77418	2001 FN_{189}	—	March 18, 2001	Socorro	LINEAR	·	4.4 km	MPC · JPL
77419	2001 FC_{191}	—	March 19, 2001	Socorro	LINEAR	·	3.8 km	MPC · JPL
77420	2001 FD_{195}	—	March 23, 2001	Anderson Mesa	LONEOS	V	1.5 km	MPC · JPL
77421	2001 GB	—	April 1, 2001	Olathe	Robinson, L.	ERI	4.5 km	MPC · JPL
77422	2001 GH	—	April 1, 2001	Socorro	LINEAR	NYS	3.0 km	MPC · JPL
77423	2001 GM	—	April 1, 2001	Socorro	LINEAR	NYS	2.8 km	MPC · JPL
77424	2001 GO	—	April 1, 2001	Socorro	LINEAR	NYS	2.4 km	MPC · JPL
77425	2001 GY	—	April 13, 2001	Kitt Peak	Spacewatch	KOR	3.1 km	MPC · JPL
77426	2001 GC_{3}	—	April 14, 2001	Socorro	LINEAR	·	7.0 km	MPC · JPL
77427	2001 GX_{4}	—	April 15, 2001	Socorro	LINEAR	·	13 km	MPC · JPL
77428	2001 GK_{5}	—	April 15, 2001	Socorro	LINEAR	·	2.0 km	MPC · JPL
77429	2001 GL_{5}	—	April 15, 2001	Socorro	LINEAR	EUN	4.4 km	MPC · JPL
77430	2001 GR_{5}	—	April 13, 2001	Kitt Peak	Spacewatch	·	4.3 km	MPC · JPL
77431	2001 GY_{5}	—	April 14, 2001	Kitt Peak	Spacewatch	·	3.7 km	MPC · JPL
77432	2001 GZ_{5}	—	April 14, 2001	Kitt Peak	Spacewatch	·	4.4 km	MPC · JPL
77433	2001 GP_{7}	—	April 15, 2001	Socorro	LINEAR	·	3.3 km	MPC · JPL
77434	2001 GY_{7}	—	April 15, 2001	Socorro	LINEAR	·	1.6 km	MPC · JPL
77435	2001 GE_{8}	—	April 15, 2001	Socorro	LINEAR	·	5.7 km	MPC · JPL
77436	2001 GH_{8}	—	April 15, 2001	Socorro	LINEAR	V	1.3 km	MPC · JPL
77437	2001 GQ_{8}	—	April 15, 2001	Socorro	LINEAR	·	1.6 km	MPC · JPL
77438	2001 GP_{10}	—	April 15, 2001	Haleakala	NEAT	·	6.1 km	MPC · JPL
77439	2001 GS_{10}	—	April 15, 2001	Haleakala	NEAT	slow	2.4 km	MPC · JPL
77440	2001 GT_{10}	—	April 15, 2001	Haleakala	NEAT	·	2.8 km	MPC · JPL
77441 Jouve	2001 HU	Jouve	April 18, 2001	Saint-Véran	St. Veran	·	3.4 km	MPC · JPL
77442	2001 HN_{1}	—	April 17, 2001	Socorro	LINEAR	·	6.0 km	MPC · JPL
77443	2001 HL_{2}	—	April 17, 2001	Socorro	LINEAR	·	1.5 km	MPC · JPL
77444	2001 HE_{3}	—	April 17, 2001	Socorro	LINEAR	THM	7.0 km	MPC · JPL
77445	2001 HP_{3}	—	April 17, 2001	Socorro	LINEAR	RAF	2.7 km	MPC · JPL
77446	2001 HT_{4}	—	April 16, 2001	Socorro	LINEAR	·	2.8 km	MPC · JPL
77447	2001 HU_{4}	—	April 16, 2001	Socorro	LINEAR	·	4.2 km	MPC · JPL
77448	2001 HC_{6}	—	April 18, 2001	Socorro	LINEAR	·	2.0 km	MPC · JPL
77449	2001 HN_{6}	—	April 18, 2001	Kitt Peak	Spacewatch	·	3.3 km	MPC · JPL
77450	2001 HU_{6}	—	April 18, 2001	Kitt Peak	Spacewatch	·	2.7 km	MPC · JPL
77451	2001 HU_{7}	—	April 18, 2001	Desert Beaver	W. K. Y. Yeung	·	7.8 km	MPC · JPL
77452	2001 HZ_{8}	—	April 16, 2001	Socorro	LINEAR	NYS	2.9 km	MPC · JPL
77453	2001 HM_{9}	—	April 16, 2001	Socorro	LINEAR	·	5.0 km	MPC · JPL
77454	2001 HR_{9}	—	April 16, 2001	Socorro	LINEAR	·	7.2 km	MPC · JPL
77455	2001 HV_{9}	—	April 16, 2001	Socorro	LINEAR	EUN	4.5 km	MPC · JPL
77456	2001 HQ_{10}	—	April 16, 2001	Socorro	LINEAR	·	5.5 km	MPC · JPL
77457	2001 HU_{11}	—	April 18, 2001	Socorro	LINEAR	·	5.5 km	MPC · JPL
77458	2001 HF_{12}	—	April 18, 2001	Socorro	LINEAR	·	3.8 km	MPC · JPL
77459	2001 HB_{13}	—	April 18, 2001	Socorro	LINEAR	EUN	3.3 km	MPC · JPL
77460	2001 HG_{13}	—	April 18, 2001	Socorro	LINEAR	·	2.5 km	MPC · JPL
77461	2001 HM_{15}	—	April 21, 2001	Socorro	LINEAR	PHO	2.7 km	MPC · JPL
77462	2001 HN_{16}	—	April 24, 2001	Desert Beaver	W. K. Y. Yeung	·	4.1 km	MPC · JPL
77463	2001 HS_{16}	—	April 25, 2001	Powell	Powell	·	4.4 km	MPC · JPL
77464	2001 HV_{16}	—	April 22, 2001	San Marcello	A. Boattini, L. Tesi	·	5.0 km	MPC · JPL
77465	2001 HK_{20}	—	April 26, 2001	Socorro	LINEAR	PHO	2.7 km	MPC · JPL
77466	2001 HL_{21}	—	April 23, 2001	Socorro	LINEAR	EOS	6.1 km	MPC · JPL
77467	2001 HW_{21}	—	April 23, 2001	Socorro	LINEAR	GEF	2.4 km	MPC · JPL
77468	2001 HZ_{21}	—	April 23, 2001	Socorro	LINEAR	EOS	4.2 km	MPC · JPL
77469	2001 HZ_{25}	—	April 27, 2001	Kitt Peak	Spacewatch	·	3.3 km	MPC · JPL
77470	2001 HA_{27}	—	April 27, 2001	Desert Beaver	W. K. Y. Yeung	(194)	5.6 km	MPC · JPL
77471	2001 HP_{27}	—	April 27, 2001	Socorro	LINEAR	·	2.6 km	MPC · JPL
77472	2001 HC_{28}	—	April 27, 2001	Socorro	LINEAR	·	2.6 km	MPC · JPL
77473	2001 HE_{28}	—	April 27, 2001	Socorro	LINEAR	·	5.5 km	MPC · JPL
77474	2001 HG_{28}	—	April 27, 2001	Socorro	LINEAR	·	2.3 km	MPC · JPL
77475	2001 HM_{28}	—	April 27, 2001	Socorro	LINEAR	·	3.2 km	MPC · JPL
77476	2001 HW_{28}	—	April 27, 2001	Socorro	LINEAR	NYS	3.3 km	MPC · JPL
77477	2001 HF_{29}	—	April 27, 2001	Socorro	LINEAR	·	7.8 km	MPC · JPL
77478	2001 HN_{29}	—	April 27, 2001	Socorro	LINEAR	·	4.7 km	MPC · JPL
77479	2001 HT_{29}	—	April 27, 2001	Socorro	LINEAR	EOS	4.3 km	MPC · JPL
77480	2001 HU_{29}	—	April 27, 2001	Socorro	LINEAR	·	5.5 km	MPC · JPL
77481	2001 HE_{30}	—	April 27, 2001	Socorro	LINEAR	(5)	4.1 km	MPC · JPL
77482	2001 HF_{30}	—	April 27, 2001	Socorro	LINEAR	·	2.0 km	MPC · JPL
77483	2001 HB_{31}	—	April 27, 2001	Kitt Peak	Spacewatch	·	1.6 km	MPC · JPL
77484	2001 HQ_{31}	—	April 26, 2001	Desert Beaver	W. K. Y. Yeung	·	6.8 km	MPC · JPL
77485	2001 HT_{31}	—	April 28, 2001	Desert Beaver	W. K. Y. Yeung	V	1.5 km	MPC · JPL
77486	2001 HA_{32}	—	April 28, 2001	Desert Beaver	W. K. Y. Yeung	NYS ·	3.1 km	MPC · JPL
77487	2001 HN_{33}	—	April 27, 2001	Socorro	LINEAR	GEF	2.1 km	MPC · JPL
77488	2001 HX_{33}	—	April 27, 2001	Socorro	LINEAR	(5)	3.0 km	MPC · JPL
77489	2001 HC_{35}	—	April 27, 2001	Socorro	LINEAR	EOS	5.6 km	MPC · JPL
77490	2001 HF_{35}	—	April 27, 2001	Socorro	LINEAR	·	3.5 km	MPC · JPL
77491	2001 HA_{36}	—	April 29, 2001	Socorro	LINEAR	EUN	3.0 km	MPC · JPL
77492	2001 HF_{36}	—	April 29, 2001	Socorro	LINEAR	·	2.9 km	MPC · JPL
77493	2001 HL_{36}	—	April 29, 2001	Socorro	LINEAR	·	2.7 km	MPC · JPL
77494	2001 HM_{36}	—	April 29, 2001	Socorro	LINEAR	·	10 km	MPC · JPL
77495	2001 HM_{37}	—	April 29, 2001	Socorro	LINEAR	LIX	9.6 km	MPC · JPL
77496	2001 HO_{37}	—	April 29, 2001	Socorro	LINEAR	GEF	3.2 km	MPC · JPL
77497	2001 HR_{37}	—	April 29, 2001	Socorro	LINEAR	·	8.1 km	MPC · JPL
77498	2001 HG_{38}	—	April 30, 2001	Desert Beaver	W. K. Y. Yeung	PHO	2.7 km	MPC · JPL
77499	2001 HJ_{39}	—	April 26, 2001	Kitt Peak	Spacewatch	KOR	3.1 km	MPC · JPL
77500	2001 HJ_{40}	—	April 27, 2001	Socorro	LINEAR	·	3.2 km	MPC · JPL

== 77501–77600 ==
back to top

Designation			Discovery			Properties		Ref
Permanent	Provisional	Named after	Date	Site	Discoverer(s)	Category	Diam.	Ref
77501	2001 HM_{40}	—	April 27, 2001	Socorro	LINEAR	·	5.6 km	MPC · JPL
77502	2001 HJ_{44}	—	April 16, 2001	Anderson Mesa	LONEOS	·	2.6 km	MPC · JPL
77503	2001 HP_{45}	—	April 17, 2001	Anderson Mesa	LONEOS	GEF	2.7 km	MPC · JPL
77504	2001 HX_{45}	—	April 17, 2001	Anderson Mesa	LONEOS	·	2.3 km	MPC · JPL
77505	2001 HA_{46}	—	April 17, 2001	Anderson Mesa	LONEOS	·	3.0 km	MPC · JPL
77506	2001 HY_{46}	—	April 18, 2001	Socorro	LINEAR	·	4.8 km	MPC · JPL
77507	2001 HT_{47}	—	April 18, 2001	Haleakala	NEAT	·	5.3 km	MPC · JPL
77508	2001 HV_{47}	—	April 19, 2001	Haleakala	NEAT	·	2.9 km	MPC · JPL
77509	2001 HW_{47}	—	April 19, 2001	Haleakala	NEAT	EUN	3.8 km	MPC · JPL
77510	2001 HQ_{48}	—	April 21, 2001	Socorro	LINEAR	·	3.7 km	MPC · JPL
77511	2001 HR_{48}	—	April 21, 2001	Socorro	LINEAR	·	7.7 km	MPC · JPL
77512	2001 HY_{48}	—	April 21, 2001	Socorro	LINEAR	·	7.4 km	MPC · JPL
77513	2001 HD_{49}	—	April 21, 2001	Socorro	LINEAR	·	3.1 km	MPC · JPL
77514	2001 HT_{49}	—	April 21, 2001	Socorro	LINEAR	·	5.4 km	MPC · JPL
77515	2001 HL_{50}	—	April 22, 2001	Haleakala	NEAT	·	6.8 km	MPC · JPL
77516	2001 HR_{50}	—	April 23, 2001	Kitt Peak	Spacewatch	·	2.0 km	MPC · JPL
77517	2001 HS_{50}	—	April 23, 2001	Socorro	LINEAR	·	6.7 km	MPC · JPL
77518	2001 HA_{52}	—	April 23, 2001	Socorro	LINEAR	·	3.1 km	MPC · JPL
77519	2001 HF_{52}	—	April 23, 2001	Socorro	LINEAR	·	2.5 km	MPC · JPL
77520	2001 HU_{52}	—	April 23, 2001	Socorro	LINEAR	·	4.9 km	MPC · JPL
77521	2001 HR_{53}	—	April 23, 2001	Socorro	LINEAR	·	2.7 km	MPC · JPL
77522	2001 HA_{54}	—	April 24, 2001	Anderson Mesa	LONEOS	·	7.7 km	MPC · JPL
77523	2001 HB_{55}	—	April 24, 2001	Socorro	LINEAR	EOS	5.1 km	MPC · JPL
77524	2001 HX_{55}	—	April 24, 2001	Socorro	LINEAR	·	8.7 km	MPC · JPL
77525	2001 HK_{56}	—	April 24, 2001	Haleakala	NEAT	NYS	1.6 km	MPC · JPL
77526	2001 HN_{57}	—	April 25, 2001	Anderson Mesa	LONEOS	·	2.7 km	MPC · JPL
77527	2001 HO_{57}	—	April 25, 2001	Anderson Mesa	LONEOS	EUN	3.0 km	MPC · JPL
77528	2001 HP_{58}	—	April 25, 2001	Haleakala	NEAT	·	5.6 km	MPC · JPL
77529	2001 HV_{60}	—	April 24, 2001	Anderson Mesa	LONEOS	MAR	2.7 km	MPC · JPL
77530	2001 HW_{60}	—	April 24, 2001	Anderson Mesa	LONEOS	·	3.2 km	MPC · JPL
77531	2001 HX_{60}	—	April 24, 2001	Anderson Mesa	LONEOS	·	8.1 km	MPC · JPL
77532	2001 HA_{61}	—	April 24, 2001	Anderson Mesa	LONEOS	MAR	2.8 km	MPC · JPL
77533	2001 HE_{61}	—	April 24, 2001	Kitt Peak	Spacewatch	·	4.4 km	MPC · JPL
77534	2001 HL_{61}	—	April 24, 2001	Haleakala	NEAT	·	2.8 km	MPC · JPL
77535	2001 HT_{62}	—	April 26, 2001	Anderson Mesa	LONEOS	·	2.4 km	MPC · JPL
77536	2001 HX_{62}	—	April 26, 2001	Anderson Mesa	LONEOS	·	1.7 km	MPC · JPL
77537	2001 HJ_{63}	—	April 26, 2001	Anderson Mesa	LONEOS	·	2.6 km	MPC · JPL
77538	2001 HZ_{63}	—	April 27, 2001	Socorro	LINEAR	·	3.6 km	MPC · JPL
77539	2001 HE_{64}	—	April 27, 2001	Socorro	LINEAR	·	3.6 km	MPC · JPL
77540	2001 HF_{64}	—	April 27, 2001	Socorro	LINEAR	NYS	2.3 km	MPC · JPL
77541	2001 HS_{64}	—	April 27, 2001	Haleakala	NEAT	GEF	4.0 km	MPC · JPL
77542	2001 HV_{65}	—	April 30, 2001	Socorro	LINEAR	V	1.5 km	MPC · JPL
77543	2001 HU_{66}	—	April 25, 2001	Anderson Mesa	LONEOS	V	1.5 km	MPC · JPL
77544	2001 HB_{67}	—	April 27, 2001	Haleakala	NEAT	NYS	2.3 km	MPC · JPL
77545	2001 JR_{1}	—	May 12, 2001	Anderson Mesa	LONEOS	·	5.9 km	MPC · JPL
77546	2001 JS_{1}	—	May 11, 2001	Haleakala	NEAT	·	2.7 km	MPC · JPL
77547	2001 JL_{2}	—	May 15, 2001	Kitt Peak	Spacewatch	·	3.0 km	MPC · JPL
77548	2001 JQ_{3}	—	May 15, 2001	Haleakala	NEAT	·	3.3 km	MPC · JPL
77549	2001 JZ_{4}	—	May 10, 2001	Haleakala	NEAT	V	1.6 km	MPC · JPL
77550	2001 JW_{5}	—	May 15, 2001	Anderson Mesa	LONEOS	·	2.6 km	MPC · JPL
77551	2001 JK_{6}	—	May 14, 2001	Kitt Peak	Spacewatch	·	2.5 km	MPC · JPL
77552	2001 JY_{6}	—	May 15, 2001	Anderson Mesa	LONEOS	NYS	2.5 km	MPC · JPL
77553	2001 JB_{7}	—	May 15, 2001	Anderson Mesa	LONEOS	·	2.7 km	MPC · JPL
77554	2001 JD_{7}	—	May 15, 2001	Anderson Mesa	LONEOS	·	2.0 km	MPC · JPL
77555	2001 JO_{7}	—	May 15, 2001	Kitt Peak	Spacewatch	·	3.5 km	MPC · JPL
77556	2001 JQ_{7}	—	May 15, 2001	Anderson Mesa	LONEOS	·	5.8 km	MPC · JPL
77557	2001 JR_{8}	—	May 15, 2001	Palomar	NEAT	V	1.9 km	MPC · JPL
77558	2001 JY_{9}	—	May 15, 2001	Haleakala	NEAT	·	6.3 km	MPC · JPL
77559	2001 KA_{1}	—	May 17, 2001	Socorro	LINEAR	·	6.5 km	MPC · JPL
77560 Furusato	2001 KP_{1}	Furusato	May 17, 2001	Saji	Saji	·	1.9 km	MPC · JPL
77561	2001 KS_{1}	—	May 16, 2001	Goodricke-Pigott	R. A. Tucker	·	3.3 km	MPC · JPL
77562	2001 KO_{3}	—	May 17, 2001	Socorro	LINEAR	·	3.7 km	MPC · JPL
77563	2001 KP_{3}	—	May 17, 2001	Socorro	LINEAR	·	2.5 km	MPC · JPL
77564	2001 KB_{4}	—	May 17, 2001	Socorro	LINEAR	TIR	6.7 km	MPC · JPL
77565	2001 KG_{4}	—	May 17, 2001	Socorro	LINEAR	·	3.8 km	MPC · JPL
77566	2001 KO_{4}	—	May 17, 2001	Socorro	LINEAR	·	2.8 km	MPC · JPL
77567	2001 KA_{6}	—	May 17, 2001	Socorro	LINEAR	·	5.6 km	MPC · JPL
77568	2001 KL_{6}	—	May 17, 2001	Socorro	LINEAR	·	6.0 km	MPC · JPL
77569	2001 KN_{6}	—	May 17, 2001	Socorro	LINEAR	KOR	3.8 km	MPC · JPL
77570	2001 KB_{9}	—	May 18, 2001	Socorro	LINEAR	·	5.4 km	MPC · JPL
77571	2001 KP_{9}	—	May 18, 2001	Socorro	LINEAR	EOS	5.3 km	MPC · JPL
77572	2001 KL_{10}	—	May 18, 2001	Socorro	LINEAR	EOS	5.5 km	MPC · JPL
77573	2001 KN_{10}	—	May 18, 2001	Socorro	LINEAR	·	2.8 km	MPC · JPL
77574	2001 KD_{11}	—	May 18, 2001	Socorro	LINEAR	NYS	2.4 km	MPC · JPL
77575	2001 KF_{11}	—	May 18, 2001	Socorro	LINEAR	·	2.5 km	MPC · JPL
77576	2001 KS_{11}	—	May 18, 2001	Socorro	LINEAR	·	9.9 km	MPC · JPL
77577	2001 KV_{11}	—	May 18, 2001	Socorro	LINEAR	·	3.3 km	MPC · JPL
77578	2001 KC_{12}	—	May 18, 2001	Socorro	LINEAR	slow	2.2 km	MPC · JPL
77579	2001 KL_{12}	—	May 18, 2001	Socorro	LINEAR	·	2.9 km	MPC · JPL
77580	2001 KO_{12}	—	May 18, 2001	Socorro	LINEAR	·	6.1 km	MPC · JPL
77581	2001 KE_{14}	—	May 18, 2001	Socorro	LINEAR	·	2.2 km	MPC · JPL
77582	2001 KH_{14}	—	May 18, 2001	Socorro	LINEAR	·	2.7 km	MPC · JPL
77583	2001 KL_{14}	—	May 18, 2001	Socorro	LINEAR	EOS	4.4 km	MPC · JPL
77584	2001 KP_{14}	—	May 18, 2001	Socorro	LINEAR	·	2.7 km	MPC · JPL
77585	2001 KQ_{14}	—	May 18, 2001	Socorro	LINEAR	·	1.7 km	MPC · JPL
77586	2001 KT_{14}	—	May 18, 2001	Socorro	LINEAR	TEL	4.8 km	MPC · JPL
77587	2001 KD_{16}	—	May 18, 2001	Socorro	LINEAR	·	1.8 km	MPC · JPL
77588	2001 KJ_{16}	—	May 18, 2001	Socorro	LINEAR	EOS	4.9 km	MPC · JPL
77589	2001 KC_{17}	—	May 18, 2001	Socorro	LINEAR	GEF	2.9 km	MPC · JPL
77590	2001 KM_{17}	—	May 21, 2001	Socorro	LINEAR	·	3.5 km	MPC · JPL
77591	2001 KO_{18}	—	May 21, 2001	Kitt Peak	Spacewatch	·	3.9 km	MPC · JPL
77592	2001 KS_{19}	—	May 22, 2001	Socorro	LINEAR	·	2.8 km	MPC · JPL
77593	2001 KJ_{20}	—	May 22, 2001	Ondřejov	P. Kušnirák, P. Pravec	·	3.2 km	MPC · JPL
77594	2001 KQ_{21}	—	May 17, 2001	Socorro	LINEAR	·	7.7 km	MPC · JPL
77595	2001 KU_{21}	—	May 17, 2001	Socorro	LINEAR	·	7.7 km	MPC · JPL
77596	2001 KX_{21}	—	May 17, 2001	Socorro	LINEAR	·	1.8 km	MPC · JPL
77597	2001 KO_{22}	—	May 17, 2001	Socorro	LINEAR	·	3.3 km	MPC · JPL
77598	2001 KE_{23}	—	May 17, 2001	Socorro	LINEAR	EOS	6.0 km	MPC · JPL
77599	2001 KT_{23}	—	May 17, 2001	Socorro	LINEAR	·	8.6 km	MPC · JPL
77600	2001 KY_{23}	—	May 17, 2001	Socorro	LINEAR	·	4.9 km	MPC · JPL

== 77601–77700 ==
back to top

Designation			Discovery			Properties		Ref
Permanent	Provisional	Named after	Date	Site	Discoverer(s)	Category	Diam.	Ref
77601	2001 KF_{26}	—	May 17, 2001	Socorro	LINEAR	·	4.4 km	MPC · JPL
77602	2001 KZ_{26}	—	May 17, 2001	Socorro	LINEAR	EUN	3.4 km	MPC · JPL
77603	2001 KS_{28}	—	May 21, 2001	Socorro	LINEAR	EUN	3.0 km	MPC · JPL
77604	2001 KK_{29}	—	May 21, 2001	Socorro	LINEAR	·	4.7 km	MPC · JPL
77605	2001 KK_{30}	—	May 21, 2001	Socorro	LINEAR	NYS	2.6 km	MPC · JPL
77606	2001 KQ_{30}	—	May 21, 2001	Socorro	LINEAR	·	6.9 km	MPC · JPL
77607	2001 KO_{31}	—	May 22, 2001	Socorro	LINEAR	GEF	2.4 km	MPC · JPL
77608	2001 KZ_{33}	—	May 18, 2001	Socorro	LINEAR	·	7.6 km	MPC · JPL
77609	2001 KM_{34}	—	May 18, 2001	Socorro	LINEAR	·	3.8 km	MPC · JPL
77610	2001 KY_{34}	—	May 18, 2001	Socorro	LINEAR	·	6.1 km	MPC · JPL
77611	2001 KZ_{34}	—	May 18, 2001	Socorro	LINEAR	V	1.6 km	MPC · JPL
77612	2001 KM_{36}	—	May 18, 2001	Socorro	LINEAR	TIR	8.7 km	MPC · JPL
77613	2001 KY_{36}	—	May 21, 2001	Socorro	LINEAR	·	5.5 km	MPC · JPL
77614	2001 KM_{37}	—	May 22, 2001	Socorro	LINEAR	·	3.3 km	MPC · JPL
77615	2001 KN_{37}	—	May 22, 2001	Socorro	LINEAR	ADE	5.8 km	MPC · JPL
77616	2001 KP_{37}	—	May 22, 2001	Socorro	LINEAR	·	6.9 km	MPC · JPL
77617	2001 KX_{37}	—	May 22, 2001	Socorro	LINEAR	·	2.8 km	MPC · JPL
77618	2001 KP_{39}	—	May 22, 2001	Socorro	LINEAR	·	3.6 km	MPC · JPL
77619	2001 KT_{40}	—	May 23, 2001	Socorro	LINEAR	·	2.4 km	MPC · JPL
77620	2001 KZ_{40}	—	May 23, 2001	Socorro	LINEAR	MAR	3.0 km	MPC · JPL
77621 Koten	2001 KZ_{41}	Koten	May 25, 2001	Ondřejov	P. Pravec, P. Kušnirák	·	8.8 km	MPC · JPL
77622	2001 KA_{43}	—	May 22, 2001	Socorro	LINEAR	EOS	4.8 km	MPC · JPL
77623	2001 KP_{43}	—	May 22, 2001	Socorro	LINEAR	·	3.2 km	MPC · JPL
77624	2001 KQ_{43}	—	May 22, 2001	Socorro	LINEAR	·	5.3 km	MPC · JPL
77625	2001 KS_{43}	—	May 22, 2001	Socorro	LINEAR	EOS	4.1 km	MPC · JPL
77626	2001 KV_{45}	—	May 22, 2001	Socorro	LINEAR	·	3.8 km	MPC · JPL
77627	2001 KG_{46}	—	May 22, 2001	Socorro	LINEAR	·	3.8 km	MPC · JPL
77628	2001 KV_{46}	—	May 22, 2001	Socorro	LINEAR	·	3.2 km	MPC · JPL
77629	2001 KE_{47}	—	May 23, 2001	Socorro	LINEAR	·	5.2 km	MPC · JPL
77630	2001 KV_{47}	—	May 24, 2001	Socorro	LINEAR	EOS	4.5 km	MPC · JPL
77631	2001 KK_{49}	—	May 24, 2001	Socorro	LINEAR	·	3.0 km	MPC · JPL
77632	2001 KR_{49}	—	May 24, 2001	Socorro	LINEAR	·	3.3 km	MPC · JPL
77633	2001 KP_{52}	—	May 18, 2001	Anderson Mesa	LONEOS	NYS	2.9 km	MPC · JPL
77634	2001 KQ_{54}	—	May 18, 2001	Anderson Mesa	LONEOS	·	5.0 km	MPC · JPL
77635	2001 KO_{55}	—	May 22, 2001	Socorro	LINEAR	·	3.0 km	MPC · JPL
77636	2001 KE_{56}	—	May 22, 2001	Socorro	LINEAR	·	5.2 km	MPC · JPL
77637	2001 KH_{56}	—	May 22, 2001	Socorro	LINEAR	PHO	3.7 km	MPC · JPL
77638	2001 KN_{56}	—	May 23, 2001	Socorro	LINEAR	·	3.0 km	MPC · JPL
77639	2001 KY_{57}	—	May 26, 2001	Socorro	LINEAR	·	6.3 km	MPC · JPL
77640	2001 KA_{58}	—	May 26, 2001	Socorro	LINEAR	·	2.8 km	MPC · JPL
77641	2001 KC_{58}	—	May 26, 2001	Socorro	LINEAR	·	2.3 km	MPC · JPL
77642	2001 KM_{58}	—	May 26, 2001	Socorro	LINEAR	·	2.4 km	MPC · JPL
77643	2001 KH_{60}	—	May 16, 2001	Haleakala	NEAT	·	3.1 km	MPC · JPL
77644	2001 KH_{65}	—	May 22, 2001	Anderson Mesa	LONEOS	·	8.2 km	MPC · JPL
77645	2001 KX_{66}	—	May 30, 2001	Socorro	LINEAR	PHO	3.4 km	MPC · JPL
77646	2001 KZ_{67}	—	May 27, 2001	Haleakala	NEAT	·	6.6 km	MPC · JPL
77647	2001 KT_{69}	—	May 22, 2001	Anderson Mesa	LONEOS	EUN	2.4 km	MPC · JPL
77648	2001 KV_{69}	—	May 22, 2001	Anderson Mesa	LONEOS	PHO	7.7 km	MPC · JPL
77649	2001 KZ_{69}	—	May 22, 2001	Socorro	LINEAR	·	7.4 km	MPC · JPL
77650	2001 KB_{71}	—	May 24, 2001	Anderson Mesa	LONEOS	NYS	1.7 km	MPC · JPL
77651	2001 KX_{71}	—	May 24, 2001	Palomar	NEAT	·	3.4 km	MPC · JPL
77652	2001 KF_{72}	—	May 24, 2001	Socorro	LINEAR	THM	4.4 km	MPC · JPL
77653	2001 KH_{72}	—	May 24, 2001	Socorro	LINEAR	·	8.1 km	MPC · JPL
77654	2001 KX_{72}	—	May 24, 2001	Socorro	LINEAR	NYS	1.8 km	MPC · JPL
77655	2001 KO_{73}	—	May 24, 2001	Socorro	LINEAR	·	3.9 km	MPC · JPL
77656	2001 LT_{3}	—	June 13, 2001	Socorro	LINEAR	DOR	9.5 km	MPC · JPL
77657	2001 LE_{5}	—	June 15, 2001	Palomar	NEAT	·	3.8 km	MPC · JPL
77658	2001 LH_{5}	—	June 15, 2001	Palomar	NEAT	·	3.1 km	MPC · JPL
77659	2001 LY_{5}	—	June 12, 2001	Kitt Peak	Spacewatch	·	9.6 km	MPC · JPL
77660	2001 LF_{8}	—	June 15, 2001	Haleakala	NEAT	EOS	7.1 km	MPC · JPL
77661	2001 LN_{8}	—	June 15, 2001	Palomar	NEAT	·	11 km	MPC · JPL
77662	2001 LU_{12}	—	June 15, 2001	Socorro	LINEAR	·	3.4 km	MPC · JPL
77663	2001 LR_{14}	—	June 15, 2001	Socorro	LINEAR	·	5.9 km	MPC · JPL
77664	2001 LT_{15}	—	June 12, 2001	Haleakala	NEAT	EOS	3.8 km	MPC · JPL
77665	2001 LW_{15}	—	June 12, 2001	Haleakala	NEAT	·	6.2 km	MPC · JPL
77666	2001 LK_{17}	—	June 15, 2001	Socorro	LINEAR	EOS	5.0 km	MPC · JPL
77667	2001 LZ_{17}	—	June 15, 2001	Palomar	NEAT	·	6.3 km	MPC · JPL
77668	2001 LL_{19}	—	June 15, 2001	Socorro	LINEAR	·	1.9 km	MPC · JPL
77669	2001 MY_{9}	—	June 23, 2001	Palomar	NEAT	·	6.7 km	MPC · JPL
77670	2001 MH_{11}	—	June 27, 2001	Palomar	NEAT	·	4.3 km	MPC · JPL
77671	2001 MD_{13}	—	June 23, 2001	Palomar	NEAT	(5651)	8.0 km	MPC · JPL
77672	2001 MV_{17}	—	June 28, 2001	Anderson Mesa	LONEOS	·	7.5 km	MPC · JPL
77673	2001 MA_{20}	—	June 25, 2001	Palomar	NEAT	slow	4.0 km	MPC · JPL
77674	2001 ML_{20}	—	June 25, 2001	Palomar	NEAT	·	3.7 km	MPC · JPL
77675	2001 MS_{21}	—	June 28, 2001	Palomar	NEAT	·	3.3 km	MPC · JPL
77676	2001 MD_{22}	—	June 28, 2001	Palomar	NEAT	·	4.3 km	MPC · JPL
77677	2001 MA_{25}	—	June 16, 2001	Anderson Mesa	LONEOS	·	3.4 km	MPC · JPL
77678	2001 MH_{27}	—	June 20, 2001	Anderson Mesa	LONEOS	·	5.1 km	MPC · JPL
77679	2001 MK_{27}	—	June 20, 2001	Anderson Mesa	LONEOS	·	6.4 km	MPC · JPL
77680	2001 MJ_{29}	—	June 27, 2001	Anderson Mesa	LONEOS	(21885)	9.0 km	MPC · JPL
77681	2001 MO_{29}	—	June 27, 2001	Anderson Mesa	LONEOS	·	2.1 km	MPC · JPL
77682	2001 MY_{29}	—	June 29, 2001	Anderson Mesa	LONEOS	·	14 km	MPC · JPL
77683	2001 NN	—	July 9, 2001	Palomar	NEAT	·	4.2 km	MPC · JPL
77684	2001 NO	—	July 9, 2001	Palomar	NEAT	·	5.7 km	MPC · JPL
77685	2001 NA_{3}	—	July 13, 2001	Palomar	NEAT	·	7.3 km	MPC · JPL
77686	2001 NA_{4}	—	July 13, 2001	Palomar	NEAT	·	9.9 km	MPC · JPL
77687	2001 NT_{6}	—	July 13, 2001	Palomar	NEAT	EOS	3.4 km	MPC · JPL
77688	2001 NF_{8}	—	July 14, 2001	Palomar	NEAT	EOS	3.6 km	MPC · JPL
77689	2001 NZ_{10}	—	July 14, 2001	Haleakala	NEAT	·	3.9 km	MPC · JPL
77690	2001 NY_{11}	—	July 13, 2001	Palomar	NEAT	EOS ·	8.4 km	MPC · JPL
77691	2001 NJ_{12}	—	July 13, 2001	Haleakala	NEAT	·	6.9 km	MPC · JPL
77692	2001 NQ_{14}	—	July 13, 2001	Palomar	NEAT	DOR	5.3 km	MPC · JPL
77693	2001 NM_{17}	—	July 14, 2001	Palomar	NEAT	·	7.7 km	MPC · JPL
77694	2001 NT_{18}	—	July 12, 2001	Haleakala	NEAT	·	7.0 km	MPC · JPL
77695	2001 NS_{19}	—	July 12, 2001	Haleakala	NEAT	·	4.9 km	MPC · JPL
77696 Patriciann	2001 OT_{2}	Patriciann	July 18, 2001	Nashville	Clingan, R.	·	4.8 km	MPC · JPL
77697	2001 OC_{3}	—	July 19, 2001	Reedy Creek	J. Broughton	·	2.7 km	MPC · JPL
77698	2001 OL_{3}	—	July 17, 2001	Palomar	NEAT	·	5.2 km	MPC · JPL
77699	2001 OV_{3}	—	July 18, 2001	Palomar	NEAT	EOS	4.0 km	MPC · JPL
77700	2001 OP_{4}	—	July 19, 2001	Palomar	NEAT	·	4.0 km	MPC · JPL

== 77701–77800 ==
back to top

Designation			Discovery			Properties		Ref
Permanent	Provisional	Named after	Date	Site	Discoverer(s)	Category	Diam.	Ref
77701	2001 OE_{8}	—	July 17, 2001	Anderson Mesa	LONEOS	DOR	5.9 km	MPC · JPL
77702	2001 OL_{23}	—	July 22, 2001	Palomar	NEAT	·	5.5 km	MPC · JPL
77703	2001 OP_{24}	—	July 16, 2001	Anderson Mesa	LONEOS	·	11 km	MPC · JPL
77704	2001 OC_{27}	—	July 18, 2001	Palomar	NEAT	·	8.0 km	MPC · JPL
77705	2001 OM_{27}	—	July 18, 2001	Palomar	NEAT	VER	7.6 km	MPC · JPL
77706	2001 OC_{29}	—	July 18, 2001	Palomar	NEAT	ARM	9.0 km	MPC · JPL
77707	2001 ON_{30}	—	July 19, 2001	Palomar	NEAT	EOS	5.7 km	MPC · JPL
77708	2001 OS_{31}	—	July 22, 2001	Palomar	NEAT	EOS	5.1 km	MPC · JPL
77709	2001 OH_{41}	—	July 21, 2001	Palomar	NEAT	EOS	5.5 km	MPC · JPL
77710	2001 ON_{41}	—	July 21, 2001	Palomar	NEAT	·	4.2 km	MPC · JPL
77711	2001 OU_{43}	—	July 23, 2001	Palomar	NEAT	·	7.5 km	MPC · JPL
77712	2001 OF_{45}	—	July 16, 2001	Anderson Mesa	LONEOS	fast	3.5 km	MPC · JPL
77713	2001 OF_{47}	—	July 16, 2001	Anderson Mesa	LONEOS	MAR	3.0 km	MPC · JPL
77714	2001 OY_{47}	—	July 16, 2001	Anderson Mesa	LONEOS	EOS	6.2 km	MPC · JPL
77715	2001 OM_{48}	—	July 16, 2001	Haleakala	NEAT	·	7.3 km	MPC · JPL
77716	2001 OF_{50}	—	July 19, 2001	Haleakala	NEAT	EUP	10 km	MPC · JPL
77717	2001 OX_{50}	—	July 21, 2001	Palomar	NEAT	EOS	5.0 km	MPC · JPL
77718	2001 OB_{51}	—	July 21, 2001	Palomar	NEAT	·	5.5 km	MPC · JPL
77719	2001 OQ_{51}	—	July 21, 2001	Palomar	NEAT	EOS	4.7 km	MPC · JPL
77720	2001 OS_{51}	—	July 21, 2001	Palomar	NEAT	LUT	9.3 km	MPC · JPL
77721	2001 OB_{52}	—	July 21, 2001	Palomar	NEAT	·	5.1 km	MPC · JPL
77722	2001 OF_{54}	—	July 21, 2001	Palomar	NEAT	·	11 km	MPC · JPL
77723	2001 OF_{55}	—	July 22, 2001	Palomar	NEAT	BRA	4.6 km	MPC · JPL
77724	2001 OE_{57}	—	July 16, 2001	Anderson Mesa	LONEOS	·	11 km	MPC · JPL
77725	2001 OF_{62}	—	July 21, 2001	Haleakala	NEAT	·	5.2 km	MPC · JPL
77726	2001 OW_{63}	—	July 23, 2001	Haleakala	NEAT	EOS	4.3 km	MPC · JPL
77727	2001 OK_{64}	—	July 24, 2001	Haleakala	NEAT	·	4.3 km	MPC · JPL
77728	2001 OZ_{66}	—	July 25, 2001	Haleakala	NEAT	·	5.1 km	MPC · JPL
77729	2001 OY_{68}	—	July 17, 2001	Palomar	NEAT	·	4.3 km	MPC · JPL
77730	2001 OF_{69}	—	July 18, 2001	Haleakala	NEAT	·	5.2 km	MPC · JPL
77731	2001 OA_{70}	—	July 19, 2001	Anderson Mesa	LONEOS	BRA	5.2 km	MPC · JPL
77732	2001 ON_{73}	—	July 21, 2001	Haleakala	NEAT	·	11 km	MPC · JPL
77733	2001 OS_{73}	—	July 21, 2001	Kitt Peak	Spacewatch	GEF	3.5 km	MPC · JPL
77734	2001 OH_{76}	—	July 19, 2001	Haleakala	NEAT	3:2	5.4 km	MPC · JPL
77735	2001 OJ_{76}	—	July 19, 2001	Haleakala	NEAT	CYB	12 km	MPC · JPL
77736	2001 OS_{77}	—	July 26, 2001	Palomar	NEAT	·	4.6 km	MPC · JPL
77737	2001 OF_{80}	—	July 29, 2001	Palomar	NEAT	·	3.2 km	MPC · JPL
77738	2001 OG_{83}	—	July 27, 2001	Palomar	NEAT	NAE	6.2 km	MPC · JPL
77739	2001 OD_{85}	—	July 20, 2001	Anderson Mesa	LONEOS	·	8.4 km	MPC · JPL
77740	2001 OP_{88}	—	July 21, 2001	Haleakala	NEAT	EOS	6.8 km	MPC · JPL
77741	2001 OB_{94}	—	July 27, 2001	Anderson Mesa	LONEOS	·	5.1 km	MPC · JPL
77742	2001 OW_{95}	—	July 27, 2001	Bergisch Gladbach	W. Bickel	·	7.2 km	MPC · JPL
77743	2001 OH_{96}	—	July 23, 2001	Palomar	NEAT	·	13 km	MPC · JPL
77744	2001 OB_{101}	—	July 27, 2001	Haleakala	NEAT	·	6.9 km	MPC · JPL
77745	2001 OT_{107}	—	July 30, 2001	Socorro	LINEAR	EUP	13 km	MPC · JPL
77746	2001 OZ_{107}	—	July 31, 2001	Socorro	LINEAR	·	10 km	MPC · JPL
77747	2001 OW_{110}	—	July 31, 2001	Palomar	NEAT	·	6.9 km	MPC · JPL
77748	2001 OY_{110}	—	July 18, 2001	Palomar	NEAT	·	8.2 km	MPC · JPL
77749	2001 PB_{2}	—	August 8, 2001	Haleakala	NEAT	slow	4.3 km	MPC · JPL
77750	2001 PC_{2}	—	August 8, 2001	Haleakala	NEAT	·	8.5 km	MPC · JPL
77751	2001 PB_{5}	—	August 9, 2001	Palomar	NEAT	·	8.3 km	MPC · JPL
77752	2001 PD_{5}	—	August 9, 2001	Palomar	NEAT	EOS	4.8 km	MPC · JPL
77753	2001 PA_{11}	—	August 8, 2001	Haleakala	NEAT	·	4.6 km	MPC · JPL
77754	2001 PH_{11}	—	August 9, 2001	Palomar	NEAT	·	7.0 km	MPC · JPL
77755 Delémont	2001 PW_{13}	Delémont	August 13, 2001	Vicques	M. Ory	·	4.3 km	MPC · JPL
77756	2001 PX_{15}	—	August 9, 2001	Palomar	NEAT	VER	6.0 km	MPC · JPL
77757	2001 PN_{29}	—	August 13, 2001	Uccle	T. Pauwels	·	6.4 km	MPC · JPL
77758	2001 PN_{34}	—	August 10, 2001	Palomar	NEAT	·	4.6 km	MPC · JPL
77759	2001 PY_{36}	—	August 11, 2001	Palomar	NEAT	EOS	6.0 km	MPC · JPL
77760	2001 PW_{38}	—	August 11, 2001	Palomar	NEAT	·	10 km	MPC · JPL
77761	2001 PJ_{41}	—	August 11, 2001	Haleakala	NEAT	·	5.3 km	MPC · JPL
77762	2001 PA_{49}	—	August 14, 2001	Palomar	NEAT	EOS	6.0 km	MPC · JPL
77763	2001 PU_{49}	—	August 15, 2001	Haleakala	NEAT	BRU	7.2 km	MPC · JPL
77764	2001 PY_{50}	—	August 3, 2001	Haleakala	NEAT	TIR	5.5 km	MPC · JPL
77765	2001 PG_{51}	—	August 7, 2001	Palomar	NEAT	EOS	4.5 km	MPC · JPL
77766	2001 PK_{59}	—	August 14, 2001	Haleakala	NEAT	·	16 km	MPC · JPL
77767	2001 PZ_{62}	—	August 13, 2001	Haleakala	NEAT	CYB	9.0 km	MPC · JPL
77768	2001 QM	—	August 16, 2001	Reedy Creek	J. Broughton	·	10 km	MPC · JPL
77769	2001 QN_{6}	—	August 16, 2001	Socorro	LINEAR	·	5.3 km	MPC · JPL
77770	2001 QR_{7}	—	August 16, 2001	Socorro	LINEAR	EOS	3.6 km	MPC · JPL
77771	2001 QN_{8}	—	August 16, 2001	Socorro	LINEAR	·	7.6 km	MPC · JPL
77772	2001 QR_{9}	—	August 16, 2001	Socorro	LINEAR	EOS	5.4 km	MPC · JPL
77773	2001 QC_{10}	—	August 16, 2001	Socorro	LINEAR	(8737)	7.0 km	MPC · JPL
77774	2001 QB_{12}	—	August 16, 2001	Socorro	LINEAR	·	13 km	MPC · JPL
77775	2001 QV_{12}	—	August 16, 2001	Socorro	LINEAR	·	6.7 km	MPC · JPL
77776	2001 QA_{16}	—	August 16, 2001	Socorro	LINEAR	·	9.7 km	MPC · JPL
77777	2001 QW_{16}	—	August 16, 2001	Socorro	LINEAR	HYG	10 km	MPC · JPL
77778	2001 QR_{18}	—	August 16, 2001	Socorro	LINEAR	·	5.9 km	MPC · JPL
77779	2001 QR_{21}	—	August 16, 2001	Socorro	LINEAR	·	8.7 km	MPC · JPL
77780	2001 QJ_{27}	—	August 16, 2001	Socorro	LINEAR	URS	9.0 km	MPC · JPL
77781	2001 QJ_{32}	—	August 17, 2001	Socorro	LINEAR	·	4.7 km	MPC · JPL
77782	2001 QP_{35}	—	August 16, 2001	Socorro	LINEAR	·	5.4 km	MPC · JPL
77783	2001 QQ_{35}	—	August 16, 2001	Socorro	LINEAR	·	4.4 km	MPC · JPL
77784	2001 QF_{36}	—	August 16, 2001	Socorro	LINEAR	·	2.9 km	MPC · JPL
77785	2001 QM_{36}	—	August 16, 2001	Socorro	LINEAR	·	7.3 km	MPC · JPL
77786	2001 QT_{36}	—	August 16, 2001	Socorro	LINEAR	·	4.1 km	MPC · JPL
77787	2001 QM_{37}	—	August 16, 2001	Socorro	LINEAR	EOS	5.6 km	MPC · JPL
77788	2001 QS_{37}	—	August 16, 2001	Socorro	LINEAR	·	7.7 km	MPC · JPL
77789	2001 QT_{40}	—	August 16, 2001	Socorro	LINEAR	EOS	4.1 km	MPC · JPL
77790	2001 QC_{44}	—	August 16, 2001	Socorro	LINEAR	·	8.7 km	MPC · JPL
77791	2001 QN_{49}	—	August 16, 2001	Socorro	LINEAR	·	7.5 km	MPC · JPL
77792	2001 QX_{51}	—	August 16, 2001	Socorro	LINEAR	·	8.4 km	MPC · JPL
77793	2001 QB_{53}	—	August 16, 2001	Socorro	LINEAR	·	4.2 km	MPC · JPL
77794	2001 QV_{54}	—	August 16, 2001	Socorro	LINEAR	·	7.3 km	MPC · JPL
77795	2001 QW_{67}	—	August 19, 2001	Socorro	LINEAR	·	5.9 km	MPC · JPL
77796	2001 QL_{68}	—	August 20, 2001	Oakley	Wolfe, C.	BRA	4.6 km	MPC · JPL
77797	2001 QQ_{85}	—	August 20, 2001	Socorro	LINEAR	·	4.1 km	MPC · JPL
77798	2001 QP_{86}	—	August 16, 2001	Palomar	NEAT	·	11 km	MPC · JPL
77799	2001 QV_{88}	—	August 19, 2001	Socorro	LINEAR	H ·	3.0 km	MPC · JPL
77800	2001 QJ_{89}	—	August 16, 2001	Palomar	NEAT	·	3.5 km	MPC · JPL

== 77801–77900 ==
back to top

Designation			Discovery			Properties		Ref
Permanent	Provisional	Named after	Date	Site	Discoverer(s)	Category	Diam.	Ref
77801	2001 QA_{100}	—	August 18, 2001	Palomar	NEAT	·	7.6 km	MPC · JPL
77802	2001 QW_{102}	—	August 19, 2001	Socorro	LINEAR	·	6.4 km	MPC · JPL
77803	2001 QF_{103}	—	August 19, 2001	Socorro	LINEAR	·	8.0 km	MPC · JPL
77804	2001 QA_{119}	—	August 17, 2001	Socorro	LINEAR	·	10 km	MPC · JPL
77805	2001 QG_{122}	—	August 19, 2001	Socorro	LINEAR	EOS	3.9 km	MPC · JPL
77806	2001 QU_{123}	—	August 19, 2001	Socorro	LINEAR	·	4.1 km	MPC · JPL
77807	2001 QU_{125}	—	August 19, 2001	Socorro	LINEAR	VER	7.8 km	MPC · JPL
77808	2001 QQ_{126}	—	August 20, 2001	Socorro	LINEAR	·	3.2 km	MPC · JPL
77809	2001 QE_{128}	—	August 20, 2001	Socorro	LINEAR	EOS	5.1 km	MPC · JPL
77810	2001 QL_{130}	—	August 20, 2001	Socorro	LINEAR	·	5.6 km	MPC · JPL
77811	2001 QL_{133}	—	August 21, 2001	Socorro	LINEAR	·	6.7 km	MPC · JPL
77812	2001 QC_{134}	—	August 21, 2001	Socorro	LINEAR	·	11 km	MPC · JPL
77813	2001 QN_{134}	—	August 22, 2001	Socorro	LINEAR	·	9.4 km	MPC · JPL
77814	2001 QY_{146}	—	August 20, 2001	Palomar	NEAT	CYB	7.7 km	MPC · JPL
77815	2001 QM_{157}	—	August 23, 2001	Anderson Mesa	LONEOS	CYB	7.5 km	MPC · JPL
77816	2001 QE_{161}	—	August 23, 2001	Anderson Mesa	LONEOS	EOS	5.4 km	MPC · JPL
77817	2001 QR_{164}	—	August 22, 2001	Haleakala	NEAT	·	7.3 km	MPC · JPL
77818	2001 QK_{165}	—	August 24, 2001	Haleakala	NEAT	URS	10 km	MPC · JPL
77819	2001 QD_{168}	—	August 25, 2001	Haleakala	NEAT	·	6.7 km	MPC · JPL
77820	2001 QR_{174}	—	August 27, 2001	Socorro	LINEAR	T_{j} (2.98) · 3:2	10 km	MPC · JPL
77821	2001 QL_{178}	—	August 26, 2001	Haleakala	NEAT	EOS	6.1 km	MPC · JPL
77822	2001 QH_{184}	—	August 21, 2001	Kitt Peak	Spacewatch	·	5.2 km	MPC · JPL
77823	2001 QS_{184}	—	August 21, 2001	Socorro	LINEAR	·	10 km	MPC · JPL
77824	2001 QX_{184}	—	August 21, 2001	Socorro	LINEAR	·	7.9 km	MPC · JPL
77825	2001 QF_{189}	—	August 22, 2001	Socorro	LINEAR	EMA	9.4 km	MPC · JPL
77826	2001 QU_{205}	—	August 23, 2001	Anderson Mesa	LONEOS	·	3.7 km	MPC · JPL
77827	2001 QA_{213}	—	August 23, 2001	Anderson Mesa	LONEOS	·	9.3 km	MPC · JPL
77828	2001 QL_{215}	—	August 23, 2001	Anderson Mesa	LONEOS	TIR	4.9 km	MPC · JPL
77829	2001 QO_{217}	—	August 23, 2001	Anderson Mesa	LONEOS	THM	7.1 km	MPC · JPL
77830	2001 QZ_{222}	—	August 24, 2001	Anderson Mesa	LONEOS	·	4.0 km	MPC · JPL
77831	2001 QL_{226}	—	August 24, 2001	Anderson Mesa	LONEOS	·	5.8 km	MPC · JPL
77832	2001 QU_{226}	—	August 24, 2001	Anderson Mesa	LONEOS	·	6.8 km	MPC · JPL
77833	2001 QN_{230}	—	August 24, 2001	Anderson Mesa	LONEOS	·	6.2 km	MPC · JPL
77834	2001 QW_{250}	—	August 24, 2001	Haleakala	NEAT	·	5.7 km	MPC · JPL
77835	2001 QS_{255}	—	August 25, 2001	Socorro	LINEAR	EOS	5.1 km	MPC · JPL
77836	2001 QJ_{258}	—	August 25, 2001	Socorro	LINEAR	EUN	3.8 km	MPC · JPL
77837	2001 QK_{267}	—	August 20, 2001	Socorro	LINEAR	CYB	12 km	MPC · JPL
77838	2001 QO_{267}	—	August 20, 2001	Palomar	NEAT	·	11 km	MPC · JPL
77839	2001 QU_{268}	—	August 20, 2001	Palomar	NEAT	·	4.5 km	MPC · JPL
77840	2001 QH_{271}	—	August 19, 2001	Socorro	LINEAR	·	6.3 km	MPC · JPL
77841	2001 QO_{272}	—	August 19, 2001	Socorro	LINEAR	·	7.2 km	MPC · JPL
77842	2001 QA_{273}	—	August 19, 2001	Socorro	LINEAR	EOS	5.3 km	MPC · JPL
77843	2001 QC_{274}	—	August 19, 2001	Socorro	LINEAR	·	7.8 km	MPC · JPL
77844	2001 QF_{276}	—	August 19, 2001	Socorro	LINEAR	·	7.8 km	MPC · JPL
77845	2001 QR_{279}	—	August 19, 2001	Socorro	LINEAR	EOS	6.2 km	MPC · JPL
77846	2001 QM_{283}	—	August 18, 2001	Palomar	NEAT	EOS	9.0 km	MPC · JPL
77847	2001 QQ_{287}	—	August 17, 2001	Socorro	LINEAR	HYG	6.8 km	MPC · JPL
77848	2001 QZ_{289}	—	August 16, 2001	Socorro	LINEAR	·	6.5 km	MPC · JPL
77849	2001 RE_{5}	—	September 8, 2001	Socorro	LINEAR	EOS	5.7 km	MPC · JPL
77850	2001 RB_{28}	—	September 7, 2001	Socorro	LINEAR	·	7.1 km	MPC · JPL
77851	2001 RW_{33}	—	September 8, 2001	Socorro	LINEAR	·	8.0 km	MPC · JPL
77852	2001 RN_{35}	—	September 8, 2001	Socorro	LINEAR	·	6.2 km	MPC · JPL
77853	2001 RS_{35}	—	September 8, 2001	Socorro	LINEAR	·	4.1 km	MPC · JPL
77854	2001 RX_{36}	—	September 8, 2001	Socorro	LINEAR	·	4.6 km	MPC · JPL
77855	2001 RK_{40}	—	September 10, 2001	Socorro	LINEAR	·	7.8 km	MPC · JPL
77856 Noblitt	2001 RN_{63}	Noblitt	September 11, 2001	Oakley	Wolfe, C.	EUN	4.0 km	MPC · JPL
77857	2001 RG_{73}	—	September 10, 2001	Socorro	LINEAR	·	5.3 km	MPC · JPL
77858	2001 RJ_{129}	—	September 12, 2001	Socorro	LINEAR	·	5.0 km	MPC · JPL
77859	2001 RY_{131}	—	September 12, 2001	Socorro	LINEAR	EOS	4.7 km	MPC · JPL
77860	2001 RQ_{133}	—	September 12, 2001	Socorro	LINEAR	L5	10 km	MPC · JPL
77861	2001 RY_{136}	—	September 12, 2001	Socorro	LINEAR	·	4.5 km	MPC · JPL
77862	2001 RG_{143}	—	September 15, 2001	Palomar	NEAT	EOS	5.5 km	MPC · JPL
77863	2001 RA_{145}	—	September 7, 2001	Goodricke-Pigott	R. A. Tucker	·	4.1 km	MPC · JPL
77864	2001 RE_{145}	—	September 7, 2001	Anderson Mesa	LONEOS	·	8.5 km	MPC · JPL
77865	2001 RC_{146}	—	September 8, 2001	Anderson Mesa	LONEOS	·	12 km	MPC · JPL
77866	2001 RR_{148}	—	September 10, 2001	Anderson Mesa	LONEOS	slow	5.6 km	MPC · JPL
77867	2001 RS_{153}	—	September 14, 2001	Palomar	NEAT	·	10 km	MPC · JPL
77868	2001 RY_{154}	—	September 12, 2001	Socorro	LINEAR	·	4.7 km	MPC · JPL
77869	2001 SA	—	September 16, 2001	Prescott	P. G. Comba	(11097)	6.5 km	MPC · JPL
77870 MOTESS	2001 SM	MOTESS	September 16, 2001	Fountain Hills	C. W. Juels, P. R. Holvorcem	·	15 km	MPC · JPL
77871	2001 SC_{9}	—	September 19, 2001	Fountain Hills	C. W. Juels, P. R. Holvorcem	·	5.3 km	MPC · JPL
77872	2001 SU_{15}	—	September 16, 2001	Socorro	LINEAR	·	4.3 km	MPC · JPL
77873	2001 SQ_{46}	—	September 16, 2001	Socorro	LINEAR	·	6.6 km	MPC · JPL
77874	2001 SK_{51}	—	September 16, 2001	Socorro	LINEAR	·	6.9 km	MPC · JPL
77875	2001 SZ_{52}	—	September 16, 2001	Socorro	LINEAR	ADE	5.7 km	MPC · JPL
77876	2001 SJ_{55}	—	September 16, 2001	Socorro	LINEAR	·	6.2 km	MPC · JPL
77877	2001 SC_{59}	—	September 17, 2001	Socorro	LINEAR	·	6.6 km	MPC · JPL
77878	2001 SE_{62}	—	September 17, 2001	Socorro	LINEAR	URS	16 km	MPC · JPL
77879	2001 SX_{79}	—	September 20, 2001	Socorro	LINEAR	·	4.8 km	MPC · JPL
77880	2001 SE_{121}	—	September 16, 2001	Socorro	LINEAR	·	6.6 km	MPC · JPL
77881	2001 SG_{122}	—	September 16, 2001	Socorro	LINEAR	·	4.5 km	MPC · JPL
77882	2001 SV_{124}	—	September 16, 2001	Socorro	LINEAR	·	7.8 km	MPC · JPL
77883	2001 SC_{126}	—	September 16, 2001	Socorro	LINEAR	·	5.4 km	MPC · JPL
77884	2001 SG_{126}	—	September 16, 2001	Socorro	LINEAR	HIL · 3:2	20 km	MPC · JPL
77885	2001 SB_{143}	—	September 16, 2001	Socorro	LINEAR	·	6.6 km	MPC · JPL
77886	2001 SN_{169}	—	September 22, 2001	Farpoint	G. Hug	·	4.9 km	MPC · JPL
77887	2001 ST_{171}	—	September 16, 2001	Socorro	LINEAR	·	5.6 km	MPC · JPL
77888	2001 SC_{181}	—	September 19, 2001	Socorro	LINEAR	HYG	7.0 km	MPC · JPL
77889	2001 SM_{192}	—	September 19, 2001	Socorro	LINEAR	·	3.5 km	MPC · JPL
77890	2001 SN_{200}	—	September 19, 2001	Socorro	LINEAR	·	4.7 km	MPC · JPL
77891	2001 SM_{232}	—	September 19, 2001	Socorro	LINEAR	L5	16 km	MPC · JPL
77892	2001 SZ_{250}	—	September 19, 2001	Socorro	LINEAR	3:2	13 km	MPC · JPL
77893	2001 SM_{251}	—	September 19, 2001	Socorro	LINEAR	3:2	6.8 km	MPC · JPL
77894	2001 SY_{263}	—	September 24, 2001	Socorro	LINEAR	L5	20 km	MPC · JPL
77895	2001 SH_{324}	—	September 16, 2001	Palomar	NEAT	T_{j} (2.98) · HIL · 3:2 · (6124)	20 km	MPC · JPL
77896	2001 TQ_{5}	—	October 10, 2001	Palomar	NEAT	EOS	4.7 km	MPC · JPL
77897	2001 TE_{64}	—	October 13, 2001	Socorro	LINEAR	L5	19 km	MPC · JPL
77898	2001 TO_{88}	—	October 14, 2001	Socorro	LINEAR	·	9.3 km	MPC · JPL
77899	2001 TS_{117}	—	October 15, 2001	Socorro	LINEAR	T_{j} (2.95)	7.1 km	MPC · JPL
77900	2001 TR_{139}	—	October 10, 2001	Palomar	NEAT	CYB	4.2 km	MPC · JPL

== 77901–78000 ==
back to top

Designation			Discovery			Properties		Ref
Permanent	Provisional	Named after	Date	Site	Discoverer(s)	Category	Diam.	Ref
77901	2001 TQ_{141}	—	October 10, 2001	Palomar	NEAT	EOS	6.3 km	MPC · JPL
77902	2001 TY_{141}	—	October 10, 2001	Palomar	NEAT	L5	17 km	MPC · JPL
77903	2001 TQ_{142}	—	October 10, 2001	Palomar	NEAT	3:2	10 km	MPC · JPL
77904	2001 TV_{144}	—	October 10, 2001	Palomar	NEAT	·	6.0 km	MPC · JPL
77905	2001 TR_{147}	—	October 10, 2001	Palomar	NEAT	3:2	10 km	MPC · JPL
77906	2001 TU_{162}	—	October 11, 2001	Palomar	NEAT	L5	20 km	MPC · JPL
77907	2001 TC_{202}	—	October 11, 2001	Socorro	LINEAR	TIR	6.0 km	MPC · JPL
77908	2001 TW_{203}	—	October 11, 2001	Socorro	LINEAR	·	3.8 km	MPC · JPL
77909	2001 TE_{210}	—	October 13, 2001	Palomar	NEAT	·	11 km	MPC · JPL
77910	2001 TV_{235}	—	October 15, 2001	Palomar	NEAT	HIL · 3:2 · (6124)	13 km	MPC · JPL
77911	2001 TB_{239}	—	October 15, 2001	Palomar	NEAT	·	11 km	MPC · JPL
77912	2001 TF_{239}	—	October 15, 2001	Palomar	NEAT	·	6.2 km	MPC · JPL
77913	2001 UT_{22}	—	October 18, 2001	Socorro	LINEAR	LIX	9.9 km	MPC · JPL
77914	2001 UE_{188}	—	October 17, 2001	Socorro	LINEAR	L5	20 km	MPC · JPL
77915	2001 VE_{36}	—	November 9, 2001	Socorro	LINEAR	·	3.9 km	MPC · JPL
77916	2001 WL_{87}	—	November 19, 2001	Socorro	LINEAR	L5	14 km	MPC · JPL
77917	2002 BS_{20}	—	January 23, 2002	Socorro	LINEAR	H ·	1.1 km	MPC · JPL
77918	2002 BP_{21}	—	January 25, 2002	Socorro	LINEAR	H	1.6 km	MPC · JPL
77919	2002 CO_{244}	—	February 11, 2002	Socorro	LINEAR	·	1.7 km	MPC · JPL
77920	2002 EU_{9}	—	March 13, 2002	Socorro	LINEAR	·	1.5 km	MPC · JPL
77921	2002 EA_{12}	—	March 15, 2002	Ametlla de Mar	J. Nomen	·	1.6 km	MPC · JPL
77922	2002 EO_{66}	—	March 13, 2002	Socorro	LINEAR	·	1.3 km	MPC · JPL
77923	2002 EL_{74}	—	March 13, 2002	Socorro	LINEAR	·	1.7 km	MPC · JPL
77924	2002 ES_{88}	—	March 9, 2002	Socorro	LINEAR	·	1.2 km	MPC · JPL
77925	2002 EL_{98}	—	March 13, 2002	Socorro	LINEAR	H	1.2 km	MPC · JPL
77926	2002 EJ_{140}	—	March 12, 2002	Palomar	NEAT	·	2.3 km	MPC · JPL
77927	2002 FK_{6}	—	March 21, 2002	Socorro	LINEAR	H	1.1 km	MPC · JPL
77928	2002 GF_{3}	—	April 6, 2002	Socorro	LINEAR	·	1.9 km	MPC · JPL
77929	2002 GO_{7}	—	April 14, 2002	Desert Eagle	W. K. Y. Yeung	V	1.5 km	MPC · JPL
77930	2002 GR_{10}	—	April 8, 2002	Bergisch Gladbach	W. Bickel	AEG	7.1 km	MPC · JPL
77931	2002 GO_{19}	—	April 14, 2002	Socorro	LINEAR	·	1.5 km	MPC · JPL
77932	2002 GC_{21}	—	April 14, 2002	Socorro	LINEAR	·	1.5 km	MPC · JPL
77933	2002 GE_{21}	—	April 14, 2002	Socorro	LINEAR	·	6.0 km	MPC · JPL
77934	2002 GN_{22}	—	April 14, 2002	Haleakala	NEAT	·	1.6 km	MPC · JPL
77935	2002 GM_{54}	—	April 5, 2002	Palomar	NEAT	·	2.0 km	MPC · JPL
77936	2002 GR_{63}	—	April 8, 2002	Palomar	NEAT	·	6.9 km	MPC · JPL
77937	2002 GN_{64}	—	April 8, 2002	Palomar	NEAT	·	1.4 km	MPC · JPL
77938	2002 GB_{83}	—	April 10, 2002	Socorro	LINEAR	·	2.6 km	MPC · JPL
77939	2002 GA_{88}	—	April 10, 2002	Socorro	LINEAR	·	1.6 km	MPC · JPL
77940	2002 GP_{88}	—	April 10, 2002	Socorro	LINEAR	·	1.8 km	MPC · JPL
77941	2002 GH_{89}	—	April 10, 2002	Palomar	NEAT	·	4.0 km	MPC · JPL
77942	2002 GV_{90}	—	April 8, 2002	Palomar	NEAT	NYS	1.3 km	MPC · JPL
77943	2002 GA_{94}	—	April 9, 2002	Socorro	LINEAR	·	2.0 km	MPC · JPL
77944	2002 GA_{96}	—	April 9, 2002	Socorro	LINEAR	·	1.4 km	MPC · JPL
77945	2002 GL_{96}	—	April 9, 2002	Socorro	LINEAR	·	1.2 km	MPC · JPL
77946	2002 GO_{100}	—	April 10, 2002	Socorro	LINEAR	·	1.6 km	MPC · JPL
77947	2002 GW_{104}	—	April 10, 2002	Socorro	LINEAR	·	1.6 km	MPC · JPL
77948	2002 GH_{116}	—	April 11, 2002	Socorro	LINEAR	V	1.6 km	MPC · JPL
77949	2002 GM_{132}	—	April 12, 2002	Socorro	LINEAR	·	2.4 km	MPC · JPL
77950	2002 GG_{134}	—	April 12, 2002	Socorro	LINEAR	·	1.5 km	MPC · JPL
77951	2002 GK_{141}	—	April 13, 2002	Palomar	NEAT	·	1.9 km	MPC · JPL
77952	2002 GU_{141}	—	April 13, 2002	Palomar	NEAT	(2076)	1.8 km	MPC · JPL
77953	2002 GO_{143}	—	April 13, 2002	Palomar	NEAT	·	1.7 km	MPC · JPL
77954	2002 GZ_{176}	—	April 4, 2002	Kitt Peak	Spacewatch	·	2.3 km	MPC · JPL
77955	2002 HX_{1}	—	April 16, 2002	Socorro	LINEAR	·	3.7 km	MPC · JPL
77956	2002 HR_{8}	—	April 21, 2002	Kitt Peak	Spacewatch	·	7.1 km	MPC · JPL
77957	2002 HF_{9}	—	April 16, 2002	Socorro	LINEAR	·	1.5 km	MPC · JPL
77958	2002 HR_{10}	—	April 21, 2002	Tebbutt	F. B. Zoltowski	MAS	1.7 km	MPC · JPL
77959	2002 HX_{11}	—	April 29, 2002	Palomar	NEAT	·	1.5 km	MPC · JPL
77960	2002 HB_{13}	—	April 22, 2002	Socorro	LINEAR	H	1.4 km	MPC · JPL
77961	2002 HP_{13}	—	April 22, 2002	Socorro	LINEAR	H	1.5 km	MPC · JPL
77962	2002 JA_{1}	—	May 3, 2002	Desert Eagle	W. K. Y. Yeung	·	5.5 km	MPC · JPL
77963	2002 JP_{1}	—	May 4, 2002	Desert Eagle	W. K. Y. Yeung	·	1.3 km	MPC · JPL
77964	2002 JT_{1}	—	May 4, 2002	Desert Eagle	W. K. Y. Yeung	·	1.8 km	MPC · JPL
77965	2002 JC_{2}	—	May 1, 2002	Palomar	NEAT	NYS	1.8 km	MPC · JPL
77966	2002 JJ_{5}	—	May 5, 2002	Desert Eagle	W. K. Y. Yeung	·	1.3 km	MPC · JPL
77967	2002 JK_{5}	—	May 5, 2002	Desert Eagle	W. K. Y. Yeung	MAS	1.2 km	MPC · JPL
77968	2002 JM_{7}	—	May 4, 2002	Palomar	NEAT	·	1.9 km	MPC · JPL
77969	2002 JX_{7}	—	May 6, 2002	Palomar	NEAT	·	1.9 km	MPC · JPL
77970	2002 JB_{10}	—	May 6, 2002	Socorro	LINEAR	H	1.5 km	MPC · JPL
77971 Donnolo	2002 JA_{11}	Donnolo	May 7, 2002	Nogales	Tenagra II	PHO	2.5 km	MPC · JPL
77972	2002 JF_{11}	—	May 2, 2002	Anderson Mesa	LONEOS	·	1.8 km	MPC · JPL
77973	2002 JR_{11}	—	May 6, 2002	Anderson Mesa	LONEOS	·	1.6 km	MPC · JPL
77974	2002 JD_{13}	—	May 8, 2002	Desert Eagle	W. K. Y. Yeung	H	1.1 km	MPC · JPL
77975	2002 JL_{18}	—	May 7, 2002	Palomar	NEAT	·	2.0 km	MPC · JPL
77976	2002 JN_{19}	—	May 7, 2002	Palomar	NEAT	·	1.6 km	MPC · JPL
77977	2002 JB_{21}	—	May 8, 2002	Haleakala	NEAT	·	1.5 km	MPC · JPL
77978	2002 JD_{21}	—	May 8, 2002	Haleakala	NEAT	·	1.8 km	MPC · JPL
77979	2002 JU_{21}	—	May 9, 2002	Desert Eagle	W. K. Y. Yeung	·	1.3 km	MPC · JPL
77980	2002 JV_{22}	—	May 8, 2002	Socorro	LINEAR	·	1.9 km	MPC · JPL
77981	2002 JK_{24}	—	May 8, 2002	Socorro	LINEAR	·	4.8 km	MPC · JPL
77982	2002 JF_{27}	—	May 8, 2002	Socorro	LINEAR	(5)	2.5 km	MPC · JPL
77983	2002 JU_{27}	—	May 9, 2002	Socorro	LINEAR	·	1.4 km	MPC · JPL
77984	2002 JO_{28}	—	May 9, 2002	Socorro	LINEAR	·	2.0 km	MPC · JPL
77985	2002 JM_{29}	—	May 9, 2002	Socorro	LINEAR	·	1.8 km	MPC · JPL
77986	2002 JX_{30}	—	May 9, 2002	Socorro	LINEAR	(5)	2.5 km	MPC · JPL
77987	2002 JY_{30}	—	May 9, 2002	Socorro	LINEAR	·	2.4 km	MPC · JPL
77988	2002 JR_{31}	—	May 9, 2002	Socorro	LINEAR	NYS	2.3 km	MPC · JPL
77989	2002 JP_{33}	—	May 9, 2002	Socorro	LINEAR	·	1.9 km	MPC · JPL
77990	2002 JV_{33}	—	May 9, 2002	Socorro	LINEAR	·	3.4 km	MPC · JPL
77991	2002 JH_{34}	—	May 9, 2002	Socorro	LINEAR	·	1.7 km	MPC · JPL
77992	2002 JD_{35}	—	May 9, 2002	Socorro	LINEAR	V	1.4 km	MPC · JPL
77993	2002 JE_{35}	—	May 9, 2002	Socorro	LINEAR	V	1.4 km	MPC · JPL
77994	2002 JY_{39}	—	May 10, 2002	Desert Eagle	W. K. Y. Yeung	·	2.1 km	MPC · JPL
77995	2002 JJ_{40}	—	May 8, 2002	Socorro	LINEAR	·	2.6 km	MPC · JPL
77996	2002 JW_{41}	—	May 8, 2002	Socorro	LINEAR	·	3.2 km	MPC · JPL
77997	2002 JD_{43}	—	May 9, 2002	Socorro	LINEAR	H	1.2 km	MPC · JPL
77998	2002 JB_{48}	—	May 9, 2002	Socorro	LINEAR	·	1.9 km	MPC · JPL
77999	2002 JD_{48}	—	May 9, 2002	Socorro	LINEAR	·	2.2 km	MPC · JPL
78000	2002 JS_{48}	—	May 9, 2002	Socorro	LINEAR	·	2.3 km	MPC · JPL

back to top

== See also ==
- Meanings of minor-planet names: 77001–78000
