= Jura Observatory =

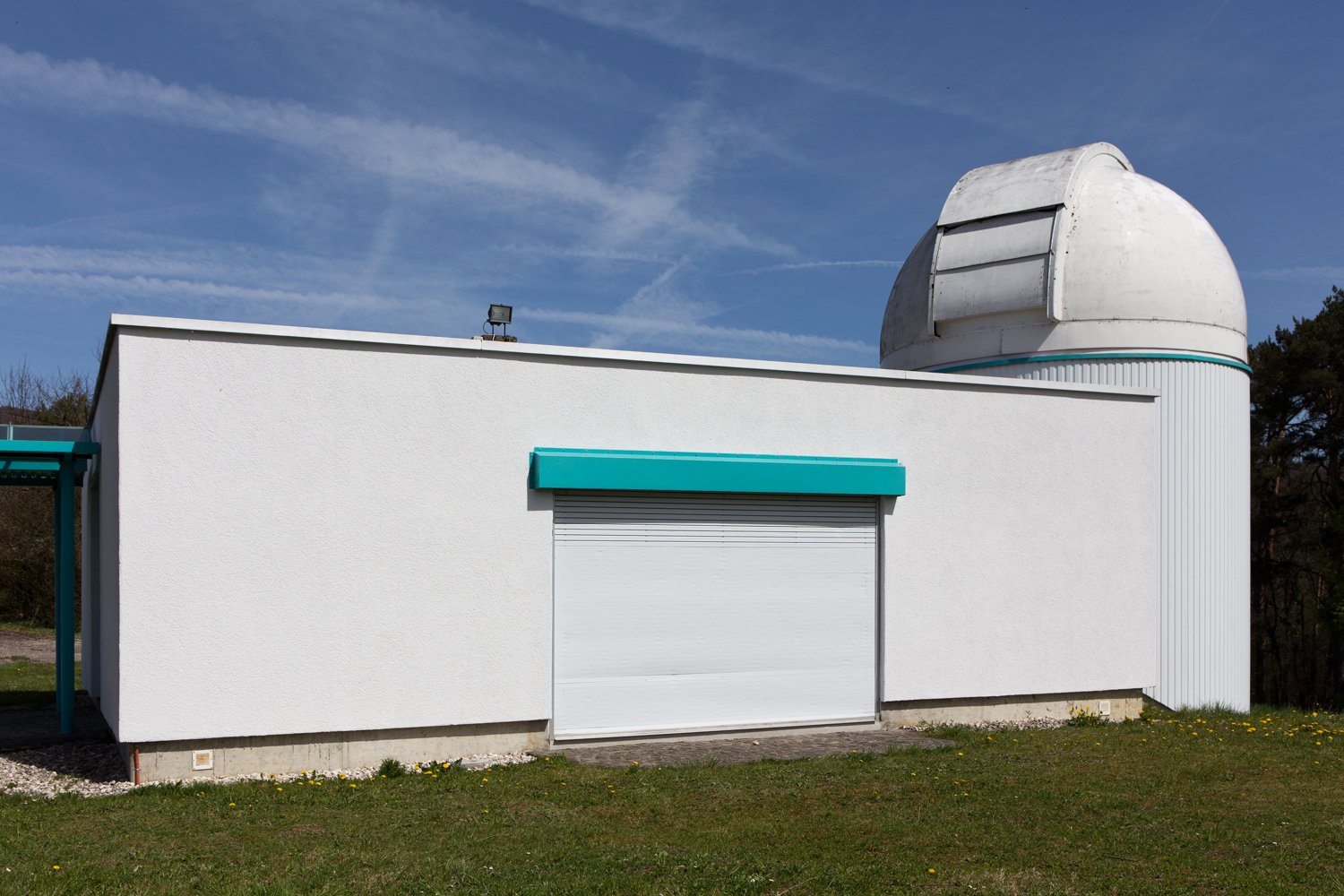
- Alternative names: Observatoire Astronomique Jurassien-Vicques
- Organization: Jura Astronomy Society (Société jurassienne d'astronomie)
- Observatory code: 185
- Location: Vicques, Canton of Jura, Switzerland.
- Coordinates: 47°21′10″N 7°25′18″E
- Altitude: 505 m (1,657 ft)
- Established: 1993
- Website: www.jura-observatory.ch

Telescopes
- Télescope Bernard Comte "TBC61": Cassegrain/Nasmith
- Related media on Commons

Minor planets discovered: 8
see § List of discovered minor planets

The Jura Observatory (French: Observatoire astronomique jurassien) is an astronomical observatory owned and operated by the Jura Astronomy Society (French: Société Jurassienne d'Astronomie; SJA). Built in 1993/1998, it is located near Vicques in the Canton of Jura, Switzerland. Its IAU observatory code is 185.

On August 28, 2008, Michel Ory discovered the periodic comet P/2008 Q2 (Ory) at the observatory.

== Oukaïmeden Observatory ==
The Jura Astronomy Society, in collaboration with French amateur astronomer Claudine Rinner and the Cadi Ayyad University, also participates in the Morocco Oukaïmeden Sky Survey (MOSS), using a remote 0.5-meter telescope at Oukaïmeden Observatory (J43), which is operated by the university since 2007. The observatory is located in the High Atlas mountains, 50 kilometers south of Marrakesh, Morocco.

== List of discovered minor planets ==
42113 Jura	15 January 2001	list
42191 Thurmann	14 February 2001	list
46095 Frédérickoby	15 March 2001	list
77755 Delémont	13 August 2001	list

(289600) 2005 GR_{9}	1 April 2005	list
360762 FRIPON	4 January 2005	list
(450390) 2005 PN_{5}	8 August 2005	list
(469748) 2005 PO_{5}	9 August 2005	list

== See also ==
- List of minor planet discoverers § Vicques
- List of minor planet discoverers § M. Ory
