= 77185 Cherryh =

Background asteroid

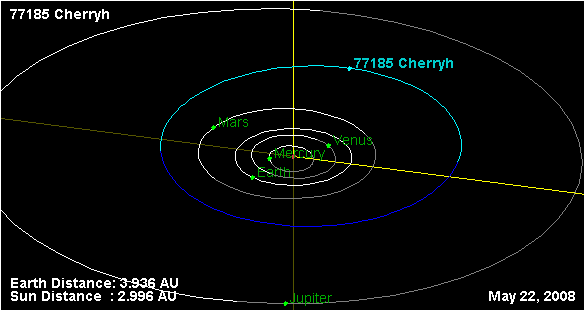
- Orbital diagram of Cherryh

Discovery
- Discovered by: D. Wells; A. Cruz
- Discovery site: George Obs.
- Discovery date: 20 March 2001

Designations
- Pronunciation: /ˈtʃɛri/
- Named after: C. J. Cherryh (American writer)
- Alternative designations: 2001 FE_{9} · 1998 TG_{27}
- Minor planet category: main-belt · (middle) background

Orbital characteristics
- Epoch 27 April 2019 (JD 2458600.5)
- Uncertainty parameter 0
- Observation arc: 27.71 yr (10,121 d)
- Aphelion: 3.0501 AU
- Perihelion: 2.1431 AU
- Semi-major axis: 2.5966 AU
- Eccentricity: 0.1746
- Orbital period (sidereal): 4.18 yr (1,528 d)
- Mean anomaly: 70.105°
- Mean motion: 0° 14^{m} 8.16^{s} / day
- Inclination: 3.1456°
- Longitude of ascending node: 12.636°
- Argument of perihelion: 231.33°

Physical characteristics
- Mean diameter: 3.985±0.166 km
- Geometric albedo: 0.049±0.009
- Absolute magnitude (H): 15.9

77185 Cherryh (provisional designation 2001 FE_{9}) is a background asteroid from the central regions of the asteroid belt, approximately 4 kilometers (2.5 miles) in diameter. It was discovered on 20 March 2001, by American amateur astronomers Don Wells and Alex Cruz at the George Observatory in Needville, Texas. The dark asteroid was named for American writer C. J. Cherryh.

== Orbit and classification ==
Cherryh is a non-family asteroid from the main belt's background population. It orbits the Sun in the central asteroid belt at a distance of 2.1–3.1 AU once every 4 years and 2 months (1,528 days; semi-major axis of 2.6 AU). Its orbit has an eccentricity of 0.17 and an inclination of 3° with respect to the ecliptic. The body's observation arc begins in October 1990, with a precovery taken by Spacewatch, more than 10 years prior to its official discovery observation at Needville.

== Naming ==
This minor planet was named by the discovering members of the Fort Bend Astronomy Club (FBAC), after C. J. Cherryh (born 1942), the award-winning American science fiction and fantasy author. The official naming citation was published by the Minor Planet Center on 13 July 2004 (M.P.C. 52327).

== Physical characteristics ==
According to the survey carried out by the NEOWISE mission of NASA's Wide-field Infrared Survey Explorer, Cherryh measures 3.985 kilometers in diameter and its surface has an albedo of 0.049. The asteroid's spectral type is unknown. Based on its low geometric albedo it is likely a carbonaceous C-type asteroid. As of 2018, no rotational lightcurve of Cherryh has been obtained from photometric observations. The body's rotation period, pole and shape remain unknown.
