= Meanings of minor-planet names: 76001–77000 =

As minor planet discoveries are confirmed, they are given a permanent number by the IAU's Minor Planet Center (MPC), and the discoverers can then submit names for them, following the IAU's naming conventions. The list below concerns those minor planets in the specified number-range that have received names, and explains the meanings of those names.

Official naming citations of newly named small Solar System bodies are approved and published in a bulletin by IAU's Working Group for Small Bodies Nomenclature (WGSBN). Before May 2021, citations were published in MPC's Minor Planet Circulars for many decades. Recent citations can also be found on the JPL Small-Body Database (SBDB). Until his death in 2016, German astronomer Lutz D. Schmadel compiled these citations into the Dictionary of Minor Planet Names (DMP) and regularly updated the collection.

Based on Paul Herget's The Names of the Minor Planets, Schmadel also researched the unclear origin of numerous asteroids, most of which had been named prior to World War II. This article incorporates text from this source, which is in the public domain: SBDB New namings may only be added to this list below after official publication as the preannouncement of names is condemned. The WGSBN publishes a comprehensive guideline for the naming rules of non-cometary small Solar System bodies.

== 76001–76100 ==
Named minor planet	Provisional	This minor planet was named for...	Ref · Catalog
There are no named minor planets in this number range

== 76101–76200 ==
back to top

Named minor planet	Provisional	This minor planet was named for...	Ref · Catalog
There are no named minor planets in this number range

== 76201–76300 ==
back to top

Named minor planet	Provisional	This minor planet was named for...	Ref · Catalog
76272 De Jong	2000 EJ_{110}	Eric De Jong (born 1946) works on the scientific visualization of planetary surfaces and atmospheres and the evolution of planetary systems dynamics at the Jet Propulsion Laboratory.	JPL · 76272

== 76301–76400 ==
back to top

Named minor planet	Provisional	This minor planet was named for...	Ref · Catalog
76309 Ronferdie	2000 EX_{137}	Ronald Ferdie (1939–2007) worked in the aerospace industry in the early days of the Apollo program at the Marshall Space Flight Center. He served in the executive of a number of amateur astronomy clubs across the U.S., inspiring and encouraging many beginners to the endeavor.	JPL · 76309
76310 Kurczewski	2000 EM_{138}	Erik Kurczewski, a lifelong amateur astronomer, eclipse chaser, comet watcher, and a staunch supporter of the International Dark Skies Association.	IAU · 76310

== 76401–76500 ==
back to top

Named minor planet	Provisional	This minor planet was named for...	Ref · Catalog
There are no named minor planets in this number range

== 76501–76600 ==
back to top

Named minor planet	Provisional	This minor planet was named for...	Ref · Catalog
There are no named minor planets in this number range

== 76601–76700 ==
back to top

Named minor planet	Provisional	This minor planet was named for...	Ref · Catalog
76628 Kozí Hrádek	2000 HC	Kozí Hrádek is a remnant of a 14th-century castle near Tábor, Czech Republic, abandoned since the end of the 15th century.	JPL · 76628

== 76701–76800 ==
back to top

Named minor planet	Provisional	This minor planet was named for...	Ref · Catalog
76713 Wudia	2000 JT_{8}	Milan Wudia (1963–2007) was an outstanding Czech engineer and a pioneer of automated telescopes. He worked at the Nicolas Copernicus Observatory and Planetarium in Brno, and among his works was a computer control system of the Ondřejov 0.65-m telescope with which this minor planet was discovered.	JPL · 76713

== 76801–76900 ==
back to top

Named minor planet	Provisional	This minor planet was named for...	Ref · Catalog
76818 Brianenke	2000 RG_{79}	Brian L. Enke (born 1964) is a systems and data analyst, and planetary scientist, at Southwest Research Institute, and also a recognized science-fiction author. He has participated in multiple interplanetary spacecraft missions and in the discovery of several asteroid satellites from imaging.	JPL · 76818

== 76901–77000 ==
back to top

Named minor planet	Provisional	This minor planet was named for...	Ref · Catalog
There are no named minor planets in this number range

back to top

Preceded by 75,001–76,000	Meanings of minor-planet names List of minor planets: 76,001–77,000	Succeeded by 77,001–78,000
