= List of minor planets: 76001–77000 =

The following is a partial list of minor planets, running from minor-planet number 76001 through 77000, inclusive. The primary data for this and other partial lists is based on JPL's "Small-Body Orbital Elements" and data available from the Minor Planet Center. Critical list information is also provided by the MPC, unless otherwise specified from Lowell Observatory. A detailed description of the table's columns and additional sources are given on the main page including a complete list of every page in this series, and a statistical break-up on the dynamical classification of minor planets.

Also see the summary list of all named bodies in numerical and alphabetical order, and the corresponding naming citations for the number range of this particular list. New namings may only be added to this list after official publication, as the preannouncement of names is condemned by the Working Group for Small Bodies Nomenclature of the International Astronomical Union.

Near-Earth obj.	MBA (inner)	MBA (outer)	Centaur
Mars-crosser	MBA (middle)	Jupiter trojan	Trans-Neptunian obj.
Unclassified

== 76001–76100 ==
Designation			Discovery			Properties		Ref
Permanent	Provisional	Named after	Date	Site	Discoverer(s)	Category	Diam.	Ref
76001	2000 DB_{18}	—	February 28, 2000	Socorro	LINEAR	·	6.7 km	MPC · JPL
76002	2000 DR_{19}	—	February 29, 2000	Socorro	LINEAR	KOR	3.3 km	MPC · JPL
76003	2000 DD_{20}	—	February 29, 2000	Socorro	LINEAR	KOR	2.6 km	MPC · JPL
76004	2000 DG_{20}	—	February 29, 2000	Socorro	LINEAR	KOR	2.8 km	MPC · JPL
76005	2000 DK_{20}	—	February 29, 2000	Socorro	LINEAR	·	6.4 km	MPC · JPL
76006	2000 DX_{21}	—	February 29, 2000	Socorro	LINEAR	·	2.5 km	MPC · JPL
76007	2000 DT_{22}	—	February 29, 2000	Socorro	LINEAR	KOR	2.7 km	MPC · JPL
76008	2000 DV_{22}	—	February 29, 2000	Socorro	LINEAR	·	2.2 km	MPC · JPL
76009	2000 DY_{23}	—	February 29, 2000	Socorro	LINEAR	·	3.4 km	MPC · JPL
76010	2000 DZ_{23}	—	February 29, 2000	Socorro	LINEAR	·	6.8 km	MPC · JPL
76011	2000 DH_{26}	—	February 29, 2000	Socorro	LINEAR	·	3.1 km	MPC · JPL
76012	2000 DQ_{26}	—	February 29, 2000	Socorro	LINEAR	·	2.6 km	MPC · JPL
76013	2000 DX_{27}	—	February 29, 2000	Socorro	LINEAR	·	4.7 km	MPC · JPL
76014	2000 DV_{28}	—	February 29, 2000	Socorro	LINEAR	·	3.8 km	MPC · JPL
76015	2000 DH_{30}	—	February 29, 2000	Socorro	LINEAR	EOS	5.1 km	MPC · JPL
76016	2000 DU_{30}	—	February 29, 2000	Socorro	LINEAR	AGN	2.8 km	MPC · JPL
76017	2000 DD_{31}	—	February 29, 2000	Socorro	LINEAR	HYG	6.0 km	MPC · JPL
76018	2000 DL_{31}	—	February 29, 2000	Socorro	LINEAR	·	6.9 km	MPC · JPL
76019	2000 DU_{31}	—	February 29, 2000	Socorro	LINEAR	KOR	2.0 km	MPC · JPL
76020	2000 DD_{33}	—	February 29, 2000	Socorro	LINEAR	·	3.9 km	MPC · JPL
76021	2000 DH_{34}	—	February 29, 2000	Socorro	LINEAR	KOR	2.2 km	MPC · JPL
76022	2000 DV_{35}	—	February 29, 2000	Socorro	LINEAR	·	3.5 km	MPC · JPL
76023	2000 DB_{38}	—	February 29, 2000	Socorro	LINEAR	KOR	3.4 km	MPC · JPL
76024	2000 DJ_{38}	—	February 29, 2000	Socorro	LINEAR	THM	5.5 km	MPC · JPL
76025	2000 DR_{38}	—	February 29, 2000	Socorro	LINEAR	THM	4.8 km	MPC · JPL
76026	2000 DD_{39}	—	February 29, 2000	Socorro	LINEAR	·	7.4 km	MPC · JPL
76027	2000 DK_{40}	—	February 29, 2000	Socorro	LINEAR	·	3.7 km	MPC · JPL
76028	2000 DF_{43}	—	February 29, 2000	Socorro	LINEAR	·	2.5 km	MPC · JPL
76029	2000 DL_{44}	—	February 29, 2000	Socorro	LINEAR	·	6.4 km	MPC · JPL
76030	2000 DM_{44}	—	February 29, 2000	Socorro	LINEAR	·	2.5 km	MPC · JPL
76031	2000 DX_{44}	—	February 29, 2000	Socorro	LINEAR	·	3.6 km	MPC · JPL
76032	2000 DS_{46}	—	February 29, 2000	Socorro	LINEAR	KOR	2.8 km	MPC · JPL
76033	2000 DW_{46}	—	February 29, 2000	Socorro	LINEAR	KOR	3.6 km	MPC · JPL
76034	2000 DX_{46}	—	February 29, 2000	Socorro	LINEAR	EUN	2.1 km	MPC · JPL
76035	2000 DD_{47}	—	February 29, 2000	Socorro	LINEAR	·	4.2 km	MPC · JPL
76036	2000 DF_{49}	—	February 29, 2000	Socorro	LINEAR	·	5.2 km	MPC · JPL
76037	2000 DA_{50}	—	February 29, 2000	Socorro	LINEAR	·	3.8 km	MPC · JPL
76038	2000 DJ_{51}	—	February 29, 2000	Socorro	LINEAR	EOS	5.1 km	MPC · JPL
76039	2000 DK_{51}	—	February 29, 2000	Socorro	LINEAR	·	2.3 km	MPC · JPL
76040	2000 DD_{52}	—	February 29, 2000	Socorro	LINEAR	·	6.4 km	MPC · JPL
76041	2000 DC_{53}	—	February 29, 2000	Socorro	LINEAR	·	5.9 km	MPC · JPL
76042	2000 DY_{53}	—	February 29, 2000	Socorro	LINEAR	·	5.6 km	MPC · JPL
76043	2000 DN_{54}	—	February 29, 2000	Socorro	LINEAR	·	6.9 km	MPC · JPL
76044	2000 DV_{55}	—	February 29, 2000	Socorro	LINEAR	·	4.4 km	MPC · JPL
76045	2000 DC_{56}	—	February 29, 2000	Socorro	LINEAR	·	3.2 km	MPC · JPL
76046	2000 DL_{56}	—	February 29, 2000	Socorro	LINEAR	(5)	2.6 km	MPC · JPL
76047	2000 DS_{56}	—	February 29, 2000	Socorro	LINEAR	(5)	3.1 km	MPC · JPL
76048	2000 DY_{56}	—	February 29, 2000	Socorro	LINEAR	·	3.0 km	MPC · JPL
76049	2000 DA_{57}	—	February 29, 2000	Socorro	LINEAR	·	2.4 km	MPC · JPL
76050	2000 DF_{58}	—	February 29, 2000	Socorro	LINEAR	EOS	4.8 km	MPC · JPL
76051	2000 DE_{59}	—	February 29, 2000	Socorro	LINEAR	·	4.7 km	MPC · JPL
76052	2000 DK_{59}	—	February 29, 2000	Socorro	LINEAR	·	4.5 km	MPC · JPL
76053	2000 DC_{61}	—	February 29, 2000	Socorro	LINEAR	·	5.7 km	MPC · JPL
76054	2000 DE_{61}	—	February 29, 2000	Socorro	LINEAR	·	2.2 km	MPC · JPL
76055	2000 DF_{61}	—	February 29, 2000	Socorro	LINEAR	·	4.7 km	MPC · JPL
76056	2000 DN_{61}	—	February 29, 2000	Socorro	LINEAR	EOS	3.4 km	MPC · JPL
76057	2000 DZ_{61}	—	February 29, 2000	Socorro	LINEAR	·	4.8 km	MPC · JPL
76058	2000 DD_{63}	—	February 29, 2000	Socorro	LINEAR	·	3.6 km	MPC · JPL
76059	2000 DV_{63}	—	February 29, 2000	Socorro	LINEAR	HYG	6.3 km	MPC · JPL
76060	2000 DJ_{68}	—	February 29, 2000	Socorro	LINEAR	·	3.8 km	MPC · JPL
76061	2000 DZ_{68}	—	February 29, 2000	Socorro	LINEAR	·	3.6 km	MPC · JPL
76062	2000 DB_{70}	—	February 29, 2000	Socorro	LINEAR	·	3.8 km	MPC · JPL
76063	2000 DW_{70}	—	February 29, 2000	Socorro	LINEAR	·	7.3 km	MPC · JPL
76064	2000 DM_{73}	—	February 29, 2000	Socorro	LINEAR	·	4.0 km	MPC · JPL
76065	2000 DD_{74}	—	February 29, 2000	Socorro	LINEAR	·	7.5 km	MPC · JPL
76066	2000 DC_{75}	—	February 29, 2000	Socorro	LINEAR	·	4.0 km	MPC · JPL
76067	2000 DF_{77}	—	February 29, 2000	Socorro	LINEAR	·	2.6 km	MPC · JPL
76068	2000 DK_{77}	—	February 29, 2000	Socorro	LINEAR	·	6.4 km	MPC · JPL
76069	2000 DS_{77}	—	February 29, 2000	Socorro	LINEAR	KOR	3.2 km	MPC · JPL
76070	2000 DN_{78}	—	February 29, 2000	Socorro	LINEAR	·	5.8 km	MPC · JPL
76071	2000 DC_{80}	—	February 28, 2000	Socorro	LINEAR	·	3.4 km	MPC · JPL
76072	2000 DT_{80}	—	February 28, 2000	Socorro	LINEAR	·	2.6 km	MPC · JPL
76073	2000 DB_{82}	—	February 28, 2000	Socorro	LINEAR	AEO	5.1 km	MPC · JPL
76074	2000 DC_{82}	—	February 28, 2000	Socorro	LINEAR	·	2.3 km	MPC · JPL
76075	2000 DM_{82}	—	February 28, 2000	Socorro	LINEAR	·	3.1 km	MPC · JPL
76076	2000 DL_{85}	—	February 29, 2000	Socorro	LINEAR	·	4.6 km	MPC · JPL
76077	2000 DW_{85}	—	February 29, 2000	Socorro	LINEAR	·	5.5 km	MPC · JPL
76078	2000 DP_{86}	—	February 29, 2000	Socorro	LINEAR	·	3.6 km	MPC · JPL
76079	2000 DT_{86}	—	February 29, 2000	Socorro	LINEAR	·	4.1 km	MPC · JPL
76080	2000 DA_{87}	—	February 29, 2000	Socorro	LINEAR	·	6.7 km	MPC · JPL
76081	2000 DV_{87}	—	February 29, 2000	Socorro	LINEAR	·	4.8 km	MPC · JPL
76082	2000 DJ_{88}	—	February 29, 2000	Socorro	LINEAR	·	5.7 km	MPC · JPL
76083	2000 DD_{90}	—	February 27, 2000	Kitt Peak	Spacewatch	·	1.9 km	MPC · JPL
76084	2000 DD_{92}	—	February 27, 2000	Kitt Peak	Spacewatch	·	6.8 km	MPC · JPL
76085	2000 DF_{92}	—	February 27, 2000	Kitt Peak	Spacewatch	·	4.3 km	MPC · JPL
76086	2000 DK_{92}	—	February 27, 2000	Kitt Peak	Spacewatch	·	3.9 km	MPC · JPL
76087	2000 DK_{93}	—	February 28, 2000	Socorro	LINEAR	·	3.9 km	MPC · JPL
76088	2000 DG_{94}	—	February 28, 2000	Socorro	LINEAR	·	3.1 km	MPC · JPL
76089	2000 DH_{94}	—	February 28, 2000	Socorro	LINEAR	·	6.6 km	MPC · JPL
76090	2000 DQ_{94}	—	February 28, 2000	Socorro	LINEAR	·	7.9 km	MPC · JPL
76091	2000 DT_{94}	—	February 28, 2000	Socorro	LINEAR	·	6.1 km	MPC · JPL
76092	2000 DV_{95}	—	February 28, 2000	Socorro	LINEAR	·	4.4 km	MPC · JPL
76093	2000 DP_{96}	—	February 29, 2000	Socorro	LINEAR	·	7.4 km	MPC · JPL
76094	2000 DE_{97}	—	February 29, 2000	Socorro	LINEAR	·	3.1 km	MPC · JPL
76095	2000 DL_{97}	—	February 29, 2000	Socorro	LINEAR	·	3.8 km	MPC · JPL
76096	2000 DQ_{97}	—	February 29, 2000	Socorro	LINEAR	·	3.3 km	MPC · JPL
76097	2000 DN_{98}	—	February 29, 2000	Socorro	LINEAR	(5)	2.7 km	MPC · JPL
76098	2000 DA_{99}	—	February 29, 2000	Socorro	LINEAR	·	4.6 km	MPC · JPL
76099	2000 DV_{100}	—	February 29, 2000	Socorro	LINEAR	·	2.6 km	MPC · JPL
76100	2000 DC_{101}	—	February 29, 2000	Socorro	LINEAR	·	3.3 km	MPC · JPL

== 76101–76200 ==
back to top

Designation			Discovery			Properties		Ref
Permanent	Provisional	Named after	Date	Site	Discoverer(s)	Category	Diam.	Ref
76101	2000 DD_{101}	—	February 29, 2000	Socorro	LINEAR	·	5.2 km	MPC · JPL
76102	2000 DP_{102}	—	February 29, 2000	Socorro	LINEAR	EOS	4.7 km	MPC · JPL
76103	2000 DF_{103}	—	February 29, 2000	Socorro	LINEAR	MAR	3.4 km	MPC · JPL
76104	2000 DT_{103}	—	February 29, 2000	Socorro	LINEAR	·	3.7 km	MPC · JPL
76105	2000 DV_{103}	—	February 29, 2000	Socorro	LINEAR	·	3.1 km	MPC · JPL
76106	2000 DF_{104}	—	February 29, 2000	Socorro	LINEAR	·	6.0 km	MPC · JPL
76107	2000 DG_{104}	—	February 29, 2000	Socorro	LINEAR	·	7.9 km	MPC · JPL
76108	2000 DX_{105}	—	February 29, 2000	Socorro	LINEAR	·	8.0 km	MPC · JPL
76109	2000 DC_{106}	—	February 29, 2000	Socorro	LINEAR	·	8.7 km	MPC · JPL
76110	2000 DD_{106}	—	February 29, 2000	Socorro	LINEAR	·	5.4 km	MPC · JPL
76111	2000 DK_{106}	—	February 29, 2000	Socorro	LINEAR	·	4.9 km	MPC · JPL
76112	2000 DC_{107}	—	February 29, 2000	Socorro	LINEAR	·	7.8 km	MPC · JPL
76113	2000 DE_{107}	—	February 29, 2000	Socorro	LINEAR	·	9.0 km	MPC · JPL
76114	2000 DF_{107}	—	February 29, 2000	Socorro	LINEAR	·	5.1 km	MPC · JPL
76115	2000 DU_{107}	—	February 28, 2000	Socorro	LINEAR	·	4.0 km	MPC · JPL
76116	2000 DZ_{109}	—	February 29, 2000	Socorro	LINEAR	·	3.5 km	MPC · JPL
76117	2000 DM_{110}	—	February 26, 2000	Uccle	T. Pauwels	·	5.9 km	MPC · JPL
76118	2000 DT_{110}	—	February 27, 2000	Socorro	LINEAR	·	4.7 km	MPC · JPL
76119	2000 DR_{112}	—	February 29, 2000	Socorro	LINEAR	·	6.0 km	MPC · JPL
76120	2000 DO_{114}	—	February 28, 2000	Kitt Peak	Spacewatch	KOR	2.4 km	MPC · JPL
76121	2000 DG_{117}	—	February 25, 2000	Catalina	CSS	·	5.1 km	MPC · JPL
76122	2000 DR_{117}	—	February 25, 2000	Kitt Peak	Spacewatch	EOS	5.3 km	MPC · JPL
76123	2000 EE	—	March 1, 2000	Oizumi	T. Kobayashi	·	3.7 km	MPC · JPL
76124	2000 EF_{1}	—	March 3, 2000	Socorro	LINEAR	·	4.2 km	MPC · JPL
76125	2000 EQ_{1}	—	March 3, 2000	Socorro	LINEAR	AGN	2.1 km	MPC · JPL
76126	2000 EW_{3}	—	March 1, 2000	Catalina	CSS	·	6.7 km	MPC · JPL
76127	2000 EV_{5}	—	March 2, 2000	Kitt Peak	Spacewatch	·	6.2 km	MPC · JPL
76128	2000 EZ_{6}	—	March 2, 2000	Kitt Peak	Spacewatch	·	8.5 km	MPC · JPL
76129	2000 EC_{8}	—	March 3, 2000	Socorro	LINEAR	·	2.8 km	MPC · JPL
76130	2000 ED_{8}	—	March 3, 2000	Socorro	LINEAR	·	4.5 km	MPC · JPL
76131	2000 EF_{8}	—	March 3, 2000	Socorro	LINEAR	·	2.7 km	MPC · JPL
76132	2000 EF_{10}	—	March 3, 2000	Socorro	LINEAR	·	3.4 km	MPC · JPL
76133	2000 ET_{10}	—	March 4, 2000	Socorro	LINEAR	JUN	3.2 km	MPC · JPL
76134	2000 EB_{11}	—	March 4, 2000	Socorro	LINEAR	·	4.5 km	MPC · JPL
76135	2000 EO_{11}	—	March 4, 2000	Socorro	LINEAR	·	2.3 km	MPC · JPL
76136	2000 EF_{12}	—	March 4, 2000	Socorro	LINEAR	EOS	4.3 km	MPC · JPL
76137	2000 EQ_{12}	—	March 4, 2000	Socorro	LINEAR	·	3.0 km	MPC · JPL
76138	2000 EX_{12}	—	March 4, 2000	Socorro	LINEAR	EOS	5.4 km	MPC · JPL
76139	2000 EZ_{12}	—	March 4, 2000	Socorro	LINEAR	·	3.2 km	MPC · JPL
76140	2000 EG_{13}	—	March 4, 2000	Socorro	LINEAR	·	11 km	MPC · JPL
76141	2000 EJ_{13}	—	March 5, 2000	Socorro	LINEAR	AGN	2.7 km	MPC · JPL
76142	2000 ER_{13}	—	March 5, 2000	Socorro	LINEAR	KOR	3.4 km	MPC · JPL
76143	2000 EV_{13}	—	March 5, 2000	Socorro	LINEAR	·	2.8 km	MPC · JPL
76144	2000 EK_{14}	—	March 5, 2000	Višnjan Observatory	K. Korlević	AEO	3.4 km	MPC · JPL
76145	2000 EO_{16}	—	March 3, 2000	Socorro	LINEAR	EOS	3.5 km	MPC · JPL
76146	2000 EU_{16}	—	March 3, 2000	Socorro	LINEAR	GEF	3.5 km	MPC · JPL
76147	2000 EY_{16}	—	March 3, 2000	Socorro	LINEAR	·	3.0 km	MPC · JPL
76148	2000 EP_{17}	—	March 4, 2000	Socorro	LINEAR	·	3.7 km	MPC · JPL
76149	2000 EY_{17}	—	March 4, 2000	Socorro	LINEAR	·	3.6 km	MPC · JPL
76150	2000 EE_{18}	—	March 4, 2000	Socorro	LINEAR	EUN	3.2 km	MPC · JPL
76151	2000 EA_{20}	—	March 7, 2000	Socorro	LINEAR	·	5.8 km	MPC · JPL
76152	2000 EH_{20}	—	March 3, 2000	Catalina	CSS	·	4.8 km	MPC · JPL
76153	2000 ER_{20}	—	March 3, 2000	Catalina	CSS	·	10 km	MPC · JPL
76154	2000 ET_{20}	—	March 3, 2000	Catalina	CSS	·	6.4 km	MPC · JPL
76155	2000 EX_{20}	—	March 3, 2000	Catalina	CSS	·	7.2 km	MPC · JPL
76156	2000 EG_{21}	—	March 3, 2000	Catalina	CSS	·	2.9 km	MPC · JPL
76157	2000 ET_{21}	—	March 5, 2000	Socorro	LINEAR	·	7.0 km	MPC · JPL
76158	2000 EL_{22}	—	March 3, 2000	Kitt Peak	Spacewatch	·	2.2 km	MPC · JPL
76159	2000 EQ_{22}	—	March 3, 2000	Kitt Peak	Spacewatch	·	3.5 km	MPC · JPL
76160	2000 EV_{23}	—	March 8, 2000	Kitt Peak	Spacewatch	·	5.3 km	MPC · JPL
76161	2000 EY_{23}	—	March 8, 2000	Kitt Peak	Spacewatch	·	2.3 km	MPC · JPL
76162	2000 EC_{25}	—	March 8, 2000	Kitt Peak	Spacewatch	·	2.2 km	MPC · JPL
76163	2000 EB_{27}	—	March 3, 2000	Socorro	LINEAR	EOS	8.4 km	MPC · JPL
76164	2000 EC_{27}	—	March 3, 2000	Socorro	LINEAR	·	3.8 km	MPC · JPL
76165	2000 EV_{28}	—	March 4, 2000	Socorro	LINEAR	EOS	4.0 km	MPC · JPL
76166	2000 EX_{28}	—	March 4, 2000	Socorro	LINEAR	·	4.5 km	MPC · JPL
76167	2000 ED_{29}	—	March 4, 2000	Socorro	LINEAR	·	10 km	MPC · JPL
76168	2000 EO_{29}	—	March 5, 2000	Socorro	LINEAR	·	4.2 km	MPC · JPL
76169	2000 ES_{29}	—	March 5, 2000	Socorro	LINEAR	·	4.9 km	MPC · JPL
76170	2000 EF_{30}	—	March 5, 2000	Socorro	LINEAR	·	4.6 km	MPC · JPL
76171	2000 EH_{31}	—	March 5, 2000	Socorro	LINEAR	·	3.3 km	MPC · JPL
76172	2000 ET_{31}	—	March 5, 2000	Socorro	LINEAR	·	6.0 km	MPC · JPL
76173	2000 EE_{32}	—	March 5, 2000	Socorro	LINEAR	·	3.5 km	MPC · JPL
76174	2000 EJ_{32}	—	March 5, 2000	Socorro	LINEAR	·	3.4 km	MPC · JPL
76175	2000 EC_{34}	—	March 5, 2000	Socorro	LINEAR	ADE	5.2 km	MPC · JPL
76176	2000 EK_{35}	—	March 8, 2000	Socorro	LINEAR	HOF	5.8 km	MPC · JPL
76177	2000 EG_{36}	—	March 5, 2000	Socorro	LINEAR	·	3.4 km	MPC · JPL
76178	2000 EL_{36}	—	March 5, 2000	Socorro	LINEAR	·	5.1 km	MPC · JPL
76179	2000 EM_{36}	—	March 5, 2000	Socorro	LINEAR	·	6.9 km	MPC · JPL
76180	2000 ER_{36}	—	March 8, 2000	Socorro	LINEAR	MAR	2.8 km	MPC · JPL
76181	2000 EX_{36}	—	March 8, 2000	Socorro	LINEAR	KOR	4.1 km	MPC · JPL
76182	2000 EB_{39}	—	March 8, 2000	Socorro	LINEAR	EOS	4.5 km	MPC · JPL
76183	2000 EN_{39}	—	March 8, 2000	Socorro	LINEAR	·	3.3 km	MPC · JPL
76184	2000 EP_{39}	—	March 8, 2000	Socorro	LINEAR	·	3.6 km	MPC · JPL
76185	2000 EQ_{39}	—	March 8, 2000	Socorro	LINEAR	KOR	3.4 km	MPC · JPL
76186	2000 EC_{40}	—	March 8, 2000	Socorro	LINEAR	EOS	4.4 km	MPC · JPL
76187	2000 EX_{40}	—	March 8, 2000	Socorro	LINEAR	KOR	4.0 km	MPC · JPL
76188	2000 EY_{40}	—	March 8, 2000	Socorro	LINEAR	·	3.5 km	MPC · JPL
76189	2000 EC_{41}	—	March 8, 2000	Socorro	LINEAR	EOS	3.9 km	MPC · JPL
76190	2000 EG_{42}	—	March 8, 2000	Socorro	LINEAR	·	3.6 km	MPC · JPL
76191	2000 EQ_{42}	—	March 8, 2000	Socorro	LINEAR	·	5.5 km	MPC · JPL
76192	2000 EU_{43}	—	March 8, 2000	Socorro	LINEAR	·	5.0 km	MPC · JPL
76193	2000 EW_{44}	—	March 9, 2000	Socorro	LINEAR	·	5.9 km	MPC · JPL
76194	2000 EG_{45}	—	March 9, 2000	Socorro	LINEAR	HYG	6.6 km	MPC · JPL
76195	2000 EU_{45}	—	March 9, 2000	Socorro	LINEAR	·	4.1 km	MPC · JPL
76196	2000 EP_{46}	—	March 9, 2000	Socorro	LINEAR	THM	6.0 km	MPC · JPL
76197	2000 EK_{47}	—	March 9, 2000	Socorro	LINEAR	·	6.9 km	MPC · JPL
76198	2000 EA_{49}	—	March 9, 2000	Socorro	LINEAR	·	5.1 km	MPC · JPL
76199	2000 EO_{49}	—	March 9, 2000	Socorro	LINEAR	·	3.1 km	MPC · JPL
76200	2000 EL_{50}	—	March 10, 2000	Prescott	P. G. Comba	·	11 km	MPC · JPL

== 76201–76300 ==
back to top

Designation			Discovery			Properties		Ref
Permanent	Provisional	Named after	Date	Site	Discoverer(s)	Category	Diam.	Ref
76201	2000 EM_{53}	—	March 8, 2000	Kitt Peak	Spacewatch	KOR	3.3 km	MPC · JPL
76202	2000 ER_{53}	—	March 8, 2000	Kitt Peak	Spacewatch	·	6.5 km	MPC · JPL
76203	2000 ER_{54}	—	March 10, 2000	Kitt Peak	Spacewatch	·	3.6 km	MPC · JPL
76204	2000 EF_{56}	—	March 8, 2000	Socorro	LINEAR	EOS	7.5 km	MPC · JPL
76205	2000 EV_{56}	—	March 8, 2000	Socorro	LINEAR	·	7.2 km	MPC · JPL
76206	2000 ES_{59}	—	March 10, 2000	Socorro	LINEAR	KOR	3.1 km	MPC · JPL
76207	2000 EW_{59}	—	March 10, 2000	Socorro	LINEAR	·	1.3 km	MPC · JPL
76208	2000 EZ_{59}	—	March 10, 2000	Socorro	LINEAR	·	4.3 km	MPC · JPL
76209	2000 ES_{61}	—	March 10, 2000	Socorro	LINEAR	·	5.2 km	MPC · JPL
76210	2000 ET_{61}	—	March 10, 2000	Socorro	LINEAR	KOR	4.4 km	MPC · JPL
76211	2000 ED_{63}	—	March 10, 2000	Socorro	LINEAR	·	3.9 km	MPC · JPL
76212	2000 EL_{63}	—	March 10, 2000	Socorro	LINEAR	THM	9.7 km	MPC · JPL
76213	2000 ET_{64}	—	March 10, 2000	Socorro	LINEAR	·	10 km	MPC · JPL
76214	2000 EV_{64}	—	March 10, 2000	Socorro	LINEAR	(13314)	3.7 km	MPC · JPL
76215	2000 ET_{65}	—	March 10, 2000	Socorro	LINEAR	KOR	4.2 km	MPC · JPL
76216	2000 EO_{66}	—	March 10, 2000	Socorro	LINEAR	KOR	3.7 km	MPC · JPL
76217	2000 EC_{67}	—	March 10, 2000	Socorro	LINEAR	HOF	5.5 km	MPC · JPL
76218	2000 ER_{67}	—	March 10, 2000	Socorro	LINEAR	·	5.2 km	MPC · JPL
76219	2000 ER_{68}	—	March 10, 2000	Socorro	LINEAR	·	3.6 km	MPC · JPL
76220	2000 EY_{68}	—	March 10, 2000	Socorro	LINEAR	·	3.8 km	MPC · JPL
76221	2000 EH_{69}	—	March 10, 2000	Socorro	LINEAR	EOS	4.4 km	MPC · JPL
76222	2000 EL_{69}	—	March 10, 2000	Socorro	LINEAR	·	4.4 km	MPC · JPL
76223	2000 EX_{69}	—	March 10, 2000	Socorro	LINEAR	KOR	3.4 km	MPC · JPL
76224	2000 EY_{69}	—	March 10, 2000	Socorro	LINEAR	·	4.5 km	MPC · JPL
76225	2000 EC_{70}	—	March 10, 2000	Socorro	LINEAR	·	11 km	MPC · JPL
76226	2000 EO_{70}	—	March 10, 2000	Socorro	LINEAR	·	4.1 km	MPC · JPL
76227	2000 EM_{71}	—	March 9, 2000	Kitt Peak	Spacewatch	·	6.2 km	MPC · JPL
76228	2000 EH_{75}	—	March 9, 2000	Socorro	LINEAR	·	5.0 km	MPC · JPL
76229	2000 EK_{75}	—	March 4, 2000	Fair Oaks Ranch	J. V. McClusky	slow	4.4 km	MPC · JPL
76230	2000 EP_{75}	—	March 4, 2000	Socorro	LINEAR	DOR	6.8 km	MPC · JPL
76231	2000 ET_{75}	—	March 5, 2000	Socorro	LINEAR	·	5.2 km	MPC · JPL
76232	2000 EU_{78}	—	March 5, 2000	Socorro	LINEAR	KOR	3.7 km	MPC · JPL
76233	2000 EX_{78}	—	March 5, 2000	Socorro	LINEAR	KOR	4.2 km	MPC · JPL
76234	2000 EQ_{79}	—	March 5, 2000	Socorro	LINEAR	KOR	3.6 km	MPC · JPL
76235	2000 EY_{80}	—	March 5, 2000	Socorro	LINEAR	DOR	6.9 km	MPC · JPL
76236	2000 ED_{81}	—	March 5, 2000	Socorro	LINEAR	ADE	4.4 km	MPC · JPL
76237	2000 EO_{81}	—	March 5, 2000	Socorro	LINEAR	·	3.6 km	MPC · JPL
76238	2000 EU_{81}	—	March 5, 2000	Socorro	LINEAR	·	4.9 km	MPC · JPL
76239	2000 EF_{82}	—	March 5, 2000	Socorro	LINEAR	EOS	4.5 km	MPC · JPL
76240	2000 EP_{82}	—	March 5, 2000	Socorro	LINEAR	EUN	3.1 km	MPC · JPL
76241	2000 EQ_{82}	—	March 5, 2000	Socorro	LINEAR	·	4.5 km	MPC · JPL
76242	2000 ED_{84}	—	March 5, 2000	Socorro	LINEAR	·	3.2 km	MPC · JPL
76243	2000 EJ_{85}	—	March 8, 2000	Socorro	LINEAR	·	2.4 km	MPC · JPL
76244	2000 EW_{85}	—	March 8, 2000	Socorro	LINEAR	AGN	3.7 km	MPC · JPL
76245	2000 EN_{86}	—	March 8, 2000	Socorro	LINEAR	TIR	6.7 km	MPC · JPL
76246	2000 EX_{86}	—	March 8, 2000	Socorro	LINEAR	·	3.6 km	MPC · JPL
76247	2000 EM_{87}	—	March 8, 2000	Socorro	LINEAR	·	6.9 km	MPC · JPL
76248	2000 ES_{87}	—	March 8, 2000	Socorro	LINEAR	EUN	3.3 km	MPC · JPL
76249	2000 EV_{87}	—	March 8, 2000	Socorro	LINEAR	·	4.5 km	MPC · JPL
76250	2000 EJ_{88}	—	March 9, 2000	Socorro	LINEAR	EUN	2.9 km	MPC · JPL
76251	2000 EK_{91}	—	March 9, 2000	Socorro	LINEAR	·	8.7 km	MPC · JPL
76252	2000 EJ_{93}	—	March 9, 2000	Socorro	LINEAR	·	11 km	MPC · JPL
76253	2000 ER_{93}	—	March 9, 2000	Socorro	LINEAR	·	6.3 km	MPC · JPL
76254	2000 ET_{93}	—	March 9, 2000	Socorro	LINEAR	·	7.9 km	MPC · JPL
76255	2000 EQ_{94}	—	March 9, 2000	Socorro	LINEAR	·	2.7 km	MPC · JPL
76256	2000 ET_{94}	—	March 9, 2000	Socorro	LINEAR	·	4.0 km	MPC · JPL
76257	2000 EA_{97}	—	March 10, 2000	Socorro	LINEAR	·	4.5 km	MPC · JPL
76258	2000 EZ_{98}	—	March 10, 2000	Kitt Peak	Spacewatch	EOS	3.6 km	MPC · JPL
76259	2000 EZ_{100}	—	March 12, 2000	Kitt Peak	Spacewatch	·	5.2 km	MPC · JPL
76260	2000 ES_{102}	—	March 14, 2000	Kitt Peak	Spacewatch	KOR	3.5 km	MPC · JPL
76261	2000 EU_{103}	—	March 12, 2000	Socorro	LINEAR	·	5.7 km	MPC · JPL
76262	2000 EV_{104}	—	March 14, 2000	Socorro	LINEAR	EUN	3.8 km	MPC · JPL
76263	2000 EY_{104}	—	March 11, 2000	Anderson Mesa	LONEOS	EOS	4.8 km	MPC · JPL
76264	2000 EZ_{104}	—	March 11, 2000	Anderson Mesa	LONEOS	GEF	2.9 km	MPC · JPL
76265	2000 EB_{105}	—	March 11, 2000	Anderson Mesa	LONEOS	·	4.6 km	MPC · JPL
76266	2000 EE_{105}	—	March 11, 2000	Anderson Mesa	LONEOS	·	11 km	MPC · JPL
76267	2000 EN_{105}	—	March 11, 2000	Anderson Mesa	LONEOS	·	7.9 km	MPC · JPL
76268	2000 EU_{105}	—	March 11, 2000	Anderson Mesa	LONEOS	·	4.8 km	MPC · JPL
76269	2000 EM_{107}	—	March 8, 2000	Socorro	LINEAR	MAR	2.8 km	MPC · JPL
76270	2000 ED_{110}	—	March 8, 2000	Haleakala	NEAT	·	5.0 km	MPC · JPL
76271	2000 EH_{110}	—	March 8, 2000	Haleakala	NEAT	EOS · fast	4.7 km	MPC · JPL
76272 De Jong	2000 EJ_{110}	De Jong	March 8, 2000	Haleakala	NEAT	slow	5.4 km	MPC · JPL
76273	2000 EZ_{111}	—	March 9, 2000	Socorro	LINEAR	EOS	3.8 km	MPC · JPL
76274	2000 EJ_{112}	—	March 9, 2000	Socorro	LINEAR	THM	4.2 km	MPC · JPL
76275	2000 EW_{113}	—	March 9, 2000	Socorro	LINEAR	·	3.7 km	MPC · JPL
76276	2000 EQ_{114}	—	March 9, 2000	Kvistaberg	Uppsala-DLR Asteroid Survey	EOS	5.1 km	MPC · JPL
76277	2000 ER_{114}	—	March 9, 2000	Kvistaberg	Uppsala-DLR Asteroid Survey	·	5.9 km	MPC · JPL
76278	2000 EP_{115}	—	March 10, 2000	Kitt Peak	Spacewatch	VER	7.2 km	MPC · JPL
76279	2000 ET_{116}	—	March 10, 2000	Socorro	LINEAR	KOR	3.7 km	MPC · JPL
76280	2000 EK_{117}	—	March 11, 2000	Anderson Mesa	LONEOS	·	3.3 km	MPC · JPL
76281	2000 EM_{118}	—	March 11, 2000	Anderson Mesa	LONEOS	·	3.4 km	MPC · JPL
76282	2000 EG_{119}	—	March 11, 2000	Anderson Mesa	LONEOS	·	3.7 km	MPC · JPL
76283	2000 ET_{119}	—	March 11, 2000	Anderson Mesa	LONEOS	·	4.3 km	MPC · JPL
76284	2000 EC_{120}	—	March 11, 2000	Anderson Mesa	LONEOS	·	2.6 km	MPC · JPL
76285	2000 EE_{121}	—	March 11, 2000	Anderson Mesa	LONEOS	·	4.6 km	MPC · JPL
76286	2000 EK_{121}	—	March 11, 2000	Anderson Mesa	LONEOS	·	6.0 km	MPC · JPL
76287	2000 EB_{123}	—	March 11, 2000	Catalina	CSS	MAR	2.3 km	MPC · JPL
76288	2000 EJ_{123}	—	March 11, 2000	Anderson Mesa	LONEOS	KOR	3.7 km	MPC · JPL
76289	2000 EG_{124}	—	March 11, 2000	Anderson Mesa	LONEOS	·	4.1 km	MPC · JPL
76290	2000 EG_{125}	—	March 11, 2000	Anderson Mesa	LONEOS	·	5.1 km	MPC · JPL
76291	2000 EH_{126}	—	March 11, 2000	Anderson Mesa	LONEOS	·	6.2 km	MPC · JPL
76292	2000 ER_{126}	—	March 11, 2000	Anderson Mesa	LONEOS	·	9.6 km	MPC · JPL
76293	2000 EV_{127}	—	March 11, 2000	Anderson Mesa	LONEOS	EUN	3.9 km	MPC · JPL
76294	2000 EA_{129}	—	March 11, 2000	Anderson Mesa	LONEOS	·	4.7 km	MPC · JPL
76295	2000 EY_{129}	—	March 11, 2000	Anderson Mesa	LONEOS	·	4.6 km	MPC · JPL
76296	2000 EE_{130}	—	March 11, 2000	Anderson Mesa	LONEOS	·	8.1 km	MPC · JPL
76297	2000 EN_{130}	—	March 11, 2000	Anderson Mesa	LONEOS	·	6.2 km	MPC · JPL
76298	2000 EC_{131}	—	March 11, 2000	Anderson Mesa	LONEOS	EOS	4.2 km	MPC · JPL
76299	2000 EF_{132}	—	March 11, 2000	Socorro	LINEAR	(31811)	5.3 km	MPC · JPL
76300	2000 EA_{133}	—	March 11, 2000	Socorro	LINEAR	·	5.6 km	MPC · JPL

== 76301–76400 ==
back to top

Designation			Discovery			Properties		Ref
Permanent	Provisional	Named after	Date	Site	Discoverer(s)	Category	Diam.	Ref
76301	2000 EL_{133}	—	March 11, 2000	Socorro	LINEAR	·	4.0 km	MPC · JPL
76302	2000 EP_{134}	—	March 11, 2000	Anderson Mesa	LONEOS	·	7.0 km	MPC · JPL
76303	2000 EY_{134}	—	March 11, 2000	Anderson Mesa	LONEOS	·	8.2 km	MPC · JPL
76304	2000 EC_{135}	—	March 11, 2000	Anderson Mesa	LONEOS	EUN	4.8 km	MPC · JPL
76305	2000 EH_{135}	—	March 11, 2000	Anderson Mesa	LONEOS	·	3.9 km	MPC · JPL
76306	2000 ES_{136}	—	March 12, 2000	Socorro	LINEAR	·	2.5 km	MPC · JPL
76307	2000 EN_{137}	—	March 7, 2000	Socorro	LINEAR	EOS	6.9 km	MPC · JPL
76308	2000 EO_{137}	—	March 7, 2000	Socorro	LINEAR	EUN	3.7 km	MPC · JPL
76309 Ronferdie	2000 EX_{137}	Ronferdie	March 10, 2000	Catalina	CSS	MAR · fast	4.6 km	MPC · JPL
76310 Kurczewski	2000 EM_{138}	Kurczewski	March 11, 2000	Catalina	CSS	·	4.4 km	MPC · JPL
76311	2000 EP_{138}	—	March 11, 2000	Catalina	CSS	·	3.5 km	MPC · JPL
76312	2000 ER_{138}	—	March 11, 2000	Catalina	CSS	·	14 km	MPC · JPL
76313	2000 EU_{138}	—	March 11, 2000	Catalina	CSS	EOS	4.7 km	MPC · JPL
76314	2000 EN_{139}	—	March 11, 2000	Catalina	CSS	·	5.1 km	MPC · JPL
76315	2000 EP_{139}	—	March 11, 2000	Catalina	CSS	·	4.2 km	MPC · JPL
76316	2000 EY_{140}	—	March 2, 2000	Catalina	CSS	·	2.9 km	MPC · JPL
76317	2000 EZ_{140}	—	March 2, 2000	Catalina	CSS	·	3.1 km	MPC · JPL
76318	2000 EY_{141}	—	March 2, 2000	Catalina	CSS	URS	12 km	MPC · JPL
76319	2000 ET_{142}	—	March 3, 2000	Catalina	CSS	EUN	2.8 km	MPC · JPL
76320	2000 EN_{144}	—	March 3, 2000	Catalina	CSS	ADE	7.0 km	MPC · JPL
76321	2000 EJ_{145}	—	March 3, 2000	Catalina	CSS	·	4.4 km	MPC · JPL
76322	2000 EP_{145}	—	March 3, 2000	Catalina	CSS	·	4.2 km	MPC · JPL
76323	2000 ET_{145}	—	March 3, 2000	Socorro	LINEAR	fast	3.3 km	MPC · JPL
76324	2000 EX_{145}	—	March 4, 2000	Socorro	LINEAR	·	6.8 km	MPC · JPL
76325	2000 EZ_{145}	—	March 4, 2000	Catalina	CSS	·	3.0 km	MPC · JPL
76326	2000 EV_{147}	—	March 4, 2000	Socorro	LINEAR	·	3.3 km	MPC · JPL
76327	2000 EE_{148}	—	March 4, 2000	Catalina	CSS	MAR	5.2 km	MPC · JPL
76328	2000 EG_{148}	—	March 4, 2000	Catalina	CSS	·	5.0 km	MPC · JPL
76329	2000 EH_{148}	—	March 4, 2000	Catalina	CSS	·	4.4 km	MPC · JPL
76330	2000 EX_{148}	—	March 4, 2000	Catalina	CSS	·	3.3 km	MPC · JPL
76331	2000 ED_{149}	—	March 5, 2000	Socorro	LINEAR	HYG	6.9 km	MPC · JPL
76332	2000 EG_{149}	—	March 5, 2000	Socorro	LINEAR	·	3.8 km	MPC · JPL
76333	2000 EV_{149}	—	March 5, 2000	Socorro	LINEAR	EUN	3.5 km	MPC · JPL
76334	2000 EJ_{150}	—	March 5, 2000	Haleakala	NEAT	·	4.6 km	MPC · JPL
76335	2000 EL_{150}	—	March 5, 2000	Haleakala	NEAT	·	4.7 km	MPC · JPL
76336	2000 EO_{151}	—	March 6, 2000	Haleakala	NEAT	(194)	4.5 km	MPC · JPL
76337	2000 EY_{152}	—	March 6, 2000	Haleakala	NEAT	EOS	3.9 km	MPC · JPL
76338	2000 EC_{153}	—	March 6, 2000	Haleakala	NEAT	EOS	5.4 km	MPC · JPL
76339	2000 EL_{153}	—	March 6, 2000	Haleakala	NEAT	·	4.2 km	MPC · JPL
76340	2000 EH_{155}	—	March 9, 2000	Socorro	LINEAR	·	9.1 km	MPC · JPL
76341	2000 EF_{156}	—	March 9, 2000	Socorro	LINEAR	·	5.6 km	MPC · JPL
76342	2000 EC_{157}	—	March 11, 2000	Catalina	CSS	EUN	2.4 km	MPC · JPL
76343	2000 EE_{157}	—	March 11, 2000	Catalina	CSS	MAR	2.2 km	MPC · JPL
76344	2000 EJ_{157}	—	March 11, 2000	Catalina	CSS	·	4.8 km	MPC · JPL
76345	2000 ES_{157}	—	March 12, 2000	Anderson Mesa	LONEOS	·	4.1 km	MPC · JPL
76346	2000 EV_{157}	—	March 12, 2000	Anderson Mesa	LONEOS	EOS	4.8 km	MPC · JPL
76347	2000 ET_{158}	—	March 12, 2000	Anderson Mesa	LONEOS	EOS	7.5 km	MPC · JPL
76348	2000 EC_{159}	—	March 3, 2000	Socorro	LINEAR	·	3.8 km	MPC · JPL
76349	2000 EQ_{161}	—	March 3, 2000	Socorro	LINEAR	·	3.4 km	MPC · JPL
76350	2000 ES_{161}	—	March 3, 2000	Socorro	LINEAR	(12739)	2.8 km	MPC · JPL
76351	2000 EF_{164}	—	March 3, 2000	Socorro	LINEAR	·	3.2 km	MPC · JPL
76352	2000 ER_{165}	—	March 3, 2000	Socorro	LINEAR	·	5.0 km	MPC · JPL
76353	2000 EB_{166}	—	March 3, 2000	Socorro	LINEAR	THM	6.2 km	MPC · JPL
76354	2000 EG_{167}	—	March 4, 2000	Socorro	LINEAR	RAF	1.8 km	MPC · JPL
76355	2000 EB_{168}	—	March 4, 2000	Socorro	LINEAR	·	4.7 km	MPC · JPL
76356	2000 EE_{168}	—	March 4, 2000	Socorro	LINEAR	·	5.5 km	MPC · JPL
76357	2000 EG_{168}	—	March 4, 2000	Socorro	LINEAR	EUN	2.4 km	MPC · JPL
76358	2000 EW_{168}	—	March 4, 2000	Socorro	LINEAR	·	13 km	MPC · JPL
76359	2000 EN_{169}	—	March 4, 2000	Socorro	LINEAR	·	7.7 km	MPC · JPL
76360	2000 EV_{170}	—	March 5, 2000	Socorro	LINEAR	DOR	7.7 km	MPC · JPL
76361	2000 EP_{171}	—	March 5, 2000	Socorro	LINEAR	·	3.9 km	MPC · JPL
76362	2000 ES_{171}	—	March 5, 2000	Socorro	LINEAR	·	6.2 km	MPC · JPL
76363	2000 EK_{173}	—	March 4, 2000	Socorro	LINEAR	·	4.2 km	MPC · JPL
76364	2000 EP_{173}	—	March 4, 2000	Socorro	LINEAR	·	6.2 km	MPC · JPL
76365	2000 ES_{173}	—	March 4, 2000	Socorro	LINEAR	URS	11 km	MPC · JPL
76366	2000 EY_{173}	—	March 4, 2000	Socorro	LINEAR	MAR · slow	4.0 km	MPC · JPL
76367	2000 ED_{174}	—	March 4, 2000	Socorro	LINEAR	·	3.4 km	MPC · JPL
76368	2000 ES_{174}	—	March 6, 2000	Haleakala	NEAT	EOS	4.9 km	MPC · JPL
76369	2000 EW_{176}	—	March 3, 2000	Catalina	CSS	·	3.3 km	MPC · JPL
76370	2000 EC_{181}	—	March 4, 2000	Socorro	LINEAR	EOS	5.8 km	MPC · JPL
76371	2000 EW_{181}	—	March 4, 2000	Socorro	LINEAR	·	2.3 km	MPC · JPL
76372	2000 EA_{182}	—	March 4, 2000	Socorro	LINEAR	·	3.2 km	MPC · JPL
76373	2000 EE_{182}	—	March 4, 2000	Socorro	LINEAR	·	4.9 km	MPC · JPL
76374	2000 EM_{183}	—	March 5, 2000	Socorro	LINEAR	·	4.7 km	MPC · JPL
76375	2000 EP_{183}	—	March 5, 2000	Socorro	LINEAR	·	5.7 km	MPC · JPL
76376	2000 EO_{184}	—	March 5, 2000	Socorro	LINEAR	·	3.8 km	MPC · JPL
76377	2000 EV_{184}	—	March 5, 2000	Socorro	LINEAR	EOS	4.7 km	MPC · JPL
76378	2000 EW_{184}	—	March 5, 2000	Socorro	LINEAR	BRG	3.4 km	MPC · JPL
76379	2000 EA_{190}	—	March 3, 2000	Socorro	LINEAR	·	4.1 km	MPC · JPL
76380	2000 EP_{197}	—	March 4, 2000	Socorro	LINEAR	EUN	2.4 km	MPC · JPL
76381	2000 ED_{198}	—	March 1, 2000	Catalina	CSS	EOS	5.1 km	MPC · JPL
76382	2000 EM_{198}	—	March 1, 2000	Catalina	CSS	EOS	6.8 km	MPC · JPL
76383	2000 EU_{199}	—	March 1, 2000	Catalina	CSS	GEF	3.9 km	MPC · JPL
76384	2000 FE	—	March 24, 2000	Farpoint	Farpoint	·	8.1 km	MPC · JPL
76385	2000 FE_{3}	—	March 28, 2000	Socorro	LINEAR	·	2.4 km	MPC · JPL
76386	2000 FF_{3}	—	March 28, 2000	Socorro	LINEAR	·	3.6 km	MPC · JPL
76387	2000 FV_{5}	—	March 25, 2000	Kitt Peak	Spacewatch	·	4.2 km	MPC · JPL
76388	2000 FB_{6}	—	March 25, 2000	Kitt Peak	Spacewatch	·	5.0 km	MPC · JPL
76389	2000 FN_{6}	—	March 25, 2000	Kitt Peak	Spacewatch	·	4.8 km	MPC · JPL
76390	2000 FQ_{6}	—	March 27, 2000	Kitt Peak	Spacewatch	HYG	4.4 km	MPC · JPL
76391	2000 FP_{7}	—	March 28, 2000	Kvistaberg	Uppsala-DLR Asteroid Survey	·	7.4 km	MPC · JPL
76392	2000 FJ_{11}	—	March 28, 2000	Socorro	LINEAR	·	5.5 km	MPC · JPL
76393	2000 FM_{11}	—	March 28, 2000	Socorro	LINEAR	·	3.6 km	MPC · JPL
76394	2000 FN_{11}	—	March 28, 2000	Socorro	LINEAR	WAT	5.3 km	MPC · JPL
76395	2000 FB_{12}	—	March 28, 2000	Socorro	LINEAR	EOS	5.2 km	MPC · JPL
76396	2000 FH_{12}	—	March 28, 2000	Socorro	LINEAR	·	7.3 km	MPC · JPL
76397	2000 FN_{12}	—	March 28, 2000	Socorro	LINEAR	ADE	6.3 km	MPC · JPL
76398	2000 FO_{12}	—	March 28, 2000	Socorro	LINEAR	·	3.4 km	MPC · JPL
76399	2000 FP_{12}	—	March 28, 2000	Socorro	LINEAR	·	3.3 km	MPC · JPL
76400	2000 FR_{12}	—	March 28, 2000	Socorro	LINEAR	·	13 km	MPC · JPL

== 76401–76500 ==
back to top

Designation			Discovery			Properties		Ref
Permanent	Provisional	Named after	Date	Site	Discoverer(s)	Category	Diam.	Ref
76401	2000 FY_{12}	—	March 29, 2000	Socorro	LINEAR	·	3.5 km	MPC · JPL
76402	2000 FZ_{12}	—	March 29, 2000	Socorro	LINEAR	·	4.3 km	MPC · JPL
76403	2000 FC_{13}	—	March 29, 2000	Socorro	LINEAR	·	3.7 km	MPC · JPL
76404	2000 FG_{13}	—	March 29, 2000	Socorro	LINEAR	(194)	3.5 km	MPC · JPL
76405	2000 FM_{13}	—	March 29, 2000	Socorro	LINEAR	PHO	5.7 km	MPC · JPL
76406	2000 FO_{13}	—	March 29, 2000	Socorro	LINEAR	MAR ·	6.7 km	MPC · JPL
76407	2000 FP_{13}	—	March 29, 2000	Socorro	LINEAR	MAR	3.1 km	MPC · JPL
76408	2000 FS_{13}	—	March 29, 2000	Socorro	LINEAR	·	4.0 km	MPC · JPL
76409	2000 FU_{13}	—	March 29, 2000	Socorro	LINEAR	·	3.9 km	MPC · JPL
76410	2000 FC_{15}	—	March 29, 2000	Kvistaberg	Uppsala-DLR Asteroid Survey	·	3.1 km	MPC · JPL
76411	2000 FQ_{16}	—	March 28, 2000	Socorro	LINEAR	·	5.6 km	MPC · JPL
76412	2000 FJ_{17}	—	March 28, 2000	Socorro	LINEAR	·	3.2 km	MPC · JPL
76413	2000 FU_{17}	—	March 29, 2000	Socorro	LINEAR	EOS	4.9 km	MPC · JPL
76414	2000 FV_{17}	—	March 29, 2000	Socorro	LINEAR	EOS	4.3 km	MPC · JPL
76415	2000 FA_{18}	—	March 29, 2000	Socorro	LINEAR	ADE	5.4 km	MPC · JPL
76416	2000 FU_{18}	—	March 29, 2000	Socorro	LINEAR	·	4.3 km	MPC · JPL
76417	2000 FW_{18}	—	March 29, 2000	Socorro	LINEAR	·	4.3 km	MPC · JPL
76418	2000 FF_{19}	—	March 29, 2000	Socorro	LINEAR	·	4.2 km	MPC · JPL
76419	2000 FJ_{19}	—	March 29, 2000	Socorro	LINEAR	·	6.3 km	MPC · JPL
76420	2000 FN_{19}	—	March 29, 2000	Socorro	LINEAR	·	3.3 km	MPC · JPL
76421	2000 FA_{20}	—	March 29, 2000	Socorro	LINEAR	EOS	6.0 km	MPC · JPL
76422	2000 FD_{21}	—	March 29, 2000	Socorro	LINEAR	MAR	2.7 km	MPC · JPL
76423	2000 FE_{21}	—	March 29, 2000	Socorro	LINEAR	EOS	6.6 km	MPC · JPL
76424	2000 FH_{21}	—	March 29, 2000	Socorro	LINEAR	·	6.1 km	MPC · JPL
76425	2000 FR_{21}	—	March 29, 2000	Socorro	LINEAR	·	4.5 km	MPC · JPL
76426	2000 FT_{21}	—	March 29, 2000	Socorro	LINEAR	RAF	2.7 km	MPC · JPL
76427	2000 FJ_{22}	—	March 29, 2000	Socorro	LINEAR	·	7.2 km	MPC · JPL
76428	2000 FL_{22}	—	March 29, 2000	Socorro	LINEAR	EOS	4.4 km	MPC · JPL
76429	2000 FG_{23}	—	March 29, 2000	Socorro	LINEAR	·	6.6 km	MPC · JPL
76430	2000 FL_{23}	—	March 29, 2000	Socorro	LINEAR	·	4.3 km	MPC · JPL
76431	2000 FU_{23}	—	March 29, 2000	Socorro	LINEAR	·	4.8 km	MPC · JPL
76432	2000 FB_{24}	—	March 29, 2000	Socorro	LINEAR	·	9.6 km	MPC · JPL
76433	2000 FM_{24}	—	March 29, 2000	Socorro	LINEAR	EOS	5.0 km	MPC · JPL
76434	2000 FO_{24}	—	March 29, 2000	Socorro	LINEAR	EOS	4.0 km	MPC · JPL
76435	2000 FT_{25}	—	March 27, 2000	Anderson Mesa	LONEOS	KOR	2.8 km	MPC · JPL
76436	2000 FT_{28}	—	March 27, 2000	Anderson Mesa	LONEOS	EOS	5.0 km	MPC · JPL
76437	2000 FD_{29}	—	March 27, 2000	Anderson Mesa	LONEOS	·	9.7 km	MPC · JPL
76438	2000 FE_{29}	—	March 27, 2000	Anderson Mesa	LONEOS	·	5.0 km	MPC · JPL
76439	2000 FP_{29}	—	March 27, 2000	Anderson Mesa	LONEOS	·	4.2 km	MPC · JPL
76440	2000 FY_{30}	—	March 28, 2000	Socorro	LINEAR	·	4.5 km	MPC · JPL
76441	2000 FB_{31}	—	March 28, 2000	Socorro	LINEAR	fast	3.4 km	MPC · JPL
76442	2000 FO_{31}	—	March 28, 2000	Socorro	LINEAR	·	3.8 km	MPC · JPL
76443	2000 FS_{31}	—	March 28, 2000	Socorro	LINEAR	·	6.5 km	MPC · JPL
76444	2000 FA_{32}	—	March 29, 2000	Socorro	LINEAR	·	3.8 km	MPC · JPL
76445	2000 FO_{32}	—	March 29, 2000	Socorro	LINEAR	EOS	5.4 km	MPC · JPL
76446	2000 FT_{32}	—	March 29, 2000	Socorro	LINEAR	·	7.7 km	MPC · JPL
76447	2000 FY_{32}	—	March 29, 2000	Socorro	LINEAR	·	3.7 km	MPC · JPL
76448	2000 FD_{33}	—	March 29, 2000	Socorro	LINEAR	·	4.2 km	MPC · JPL
76449	2000 FL_{33}	—	March 29, 2000	Socorro	LINEAR	EOS	5.9 km	MPC · JPL
76450	2000 FL_{34}	—	March 29, 2000	Socorro	LINEAR	MAR	3.8 km	MPC · JPL
76451	2000 FB_{36}	—	March 29, 2000	Socorro	LINEAR	·	7.7 km	MPC · JPL
76452	2000 FO_{36}	—	March 29, 2000	Socorro	LINEAR	EOS	6.7 km	MPC · JPL
76453	2000 FT_{36}	—	March 29, 2000	Socorro	LINEAR	KOR	3.1 km	MPC · JPL
76454	2000 FM_{37}	—	March 29, 2000	Socorro	LINEAR	·	8.7 km	MPC · JPL
76455	2000 FA_{38}	—	March 29, 2000	Socorro	LINEAR	·	2.3 km	MPC · JPL
76456	2000 FL_{38}	—	March 29, 2000	Socorro	LINEAR	TIR	3.4 km	MPC · JPL
76457	2000 FV_{38}	—	March 29, 2000	Socorro	LINEAR	·	10 km	MPC · JPL
76458	2000 FA_{39}	—	March 29, 2000	Socorro	LINEAR	·	5.3 km	MPC · JPL
76459	2000 FE_{41}	—	March 29, 2000	Socorro	LINEAR	BRA	3.6 km	MPC · JPL
76460	2000 FQ_{41}	—	March 29, 2000	Socorro	LINEAR	ADE	5.9 km	MPC · JPL
76461	2000 FH_{44}	—	March 29, 2000	Socorro	LINEAR	EOS	5.6 km	MPC · JPL
76462	2000 FP_{44}	—	March 29, 2000	Socorro	LINEAR	·	10 km	MPC · JPL
76463	2000 FZ_{45}	—	March 29, 2000	Socorro	LINEAR	RAF	1.8 km	MPC · JPL
76464	2000 FP_{46}	—	March 29, 2000	Socorro	LINEAR	·	9.4 km	MPC · JPL
76465	2000 FQ_{46}	—	March 29, 2000	Socorro	LINEAR	EUN	3.0 km	MPC · JPL
76466	2000 FD_{47}	—	March 29, 2000	Socorro	LINEAR	·	5.4 km	MPC · JPL
76467	2000 FP_{48}	—	March 30, 2000	Socorro	LINEAR	TIR	6.2 km	MPC · JPL
76468	2000 FY_{55}	—	March 29, 2000	Socorro	LINEAR	·	3.5 km	MPC · JPL
76469	2000 FY_{56}	—	March 29, 2000	Socorro	LINEAR	·	4.0 km	MPC · JPL
76470	2000 FC_{57}	—	March 30, 2000	Catalina	CSS	PAD	5.3 km	MPC · JPL
76471	2000 FD_{57}	—	March 30, 2000	Catalina	CSS	EOS	6.2 km	MPC · JPL
76472	2000 FP_{57}	—	March 26, 2000	Anderson Mesa	LONEOS	·	4.1 km	MPC · JPL
76473	2000 FR_{57}	—	March 26, 2000	Anderson Mesa	LONEOS	·	3.1 km	MPC · JPL
76474	2000 FK_{58}	—	March 26, 2000	Anderson Mesa	LONEOS	·	7.3 km	MPC · JPL
76475	2000 FQ_{58}	—	March 26, 2000	Anderson Mesa	LONEOS	EUN	3.0 km	MPC · JPL
76476	2000 FU_{58}	—	March 26, 2000	Anderson Mesa	LONEOS	·	4.0 km	MPC · JPL
76477	2000 FB_{59}	—	March 28, 2000	Socorro	LINEAR	·	3.6 km	MPC · JPL
76478	2000 FL_{60}	—	March 29, 2000	Socorro	LINEAR	·	6.1 km	MPC · JPL
76479	2000 FF_{62}	—	March 26, 2000	Anderson Mesa	LONEOS	·	8.3 km	MPC · JPL
76480	2000 FH_{63}	—	March 27, 2000	Anderson Mesa	LONEOS	EOS	5.5 km	MPC · JPL
76481	2000 FW_{63}	—	March 29, 2000	Socorro	LINEAR	·	4.2 km	MPC · JPL
76482	2000 FJ_{64}	—	March 29, 2000	Socorro	LINEAR	·	5.4 km	MPC · JPL
76483	2000 FS_{65}	—	March 27, 2000	Anderson Mesa	LONEOS	·	4.6 km	MPC · JPL
76484	2000 FQ_{68}	—	March 26, 2000	Anderson Mesa	LONEOS	·	6.2 km	MPC · JPL
76485	2000 FS_{71}	—	March 27, 2000	Anderson Mesa	LONEOS	EOS	4.9 km	MPC · JPL
76486	2000 FY_{72}	—	March 26, 2000	Anderson Mesa	LONEOS	fast	4.4 km	MPC · JPL
76487	2000 FU_{73}	—	March 26, 2000	Anderson Mesa	LONEOS	·	3.1 km	MPC · JPL
76488	2000 GG	—	April 1, 2000	Kitt Peak	Spacewatch	·	5.0 km	MPC · JPL
76489	2000 GC_{5}	—	April 3, 2000	Socorro	LINEAR	GEF	2.6 km	MPC · JPL
76490	2000 GH_{7}	—	April 4, 2000	Socorro	LINEAR	·	3.5 km	MPC · JPL
76491	2000 GN_{7}	—	April 4, 2000	Socorro	LINEAR	·	4.0 km	MPC · JPL
76492	2000 GS_{9}	—	April 5, 2000	Socorro	LINEAR	·	4.7 km	MPC · JPL
76493	2000 GZ_{9}	—	April 5, 2000	Socorro	LINEAR	·	4.4 km	MPC · JPL
76494	2000 GK_{10}	—	April 5, 2000	Socorro	LINEAR	·	5.1 km	MPC · JPL
76495	2000 GR_{10}	—	April 5, 2000	Socorro	LINEAR	·	3.7 km	MPC · JPL
76496	2000 GM_{13}	—	April 5, 2000	Socorro	LINEAR	·	5.8 km	MPC · JPL
76497	2000 GJ_{16}	—	April 5, 2000	Socorro	LINEAR	AGN	2.5 km	MPC · JPL
76498	2000 GC_{17}	—	April 5, 2000	Socorro	LINEAR	EOS	4.7 km	MPC · JPL
76499	2000 GZ_{17}	—	April 5, 2000	Socorro	LINEAR	(5)	3.7 km	MPC · JPL
76500	2000 GP_{21}	—	April 5, 2000	Socorro	LINEAR	·	6.5 km	MPC · JPL

== 76501–76600 ==
back to top

Designation			Discovery			Properties		Ref
Permanent	Provisional	Named after	Date	Site	Discoverer(s)	Category	Diam.	Ref
76501	2000 GH_{25}	—	April 5, 2000	Socorro	LINEAR	KOR	2.9 km	MPC · JPL
76502	2000 GV_{26}	—	April 5, 2000	Socorro	LINEAR	EOS	4.6 km	MPC · JPL
76503	2000 GL_{27}	—	April 5, 2000	Socorro	LINEAR	KOR	2.7 km	MPC · JPL
76504	2000 GN_{28}	—	April 5, 2000	Socorro	LINEAR	KOR	3.1 km	MPC · JPL
76505	2000 GU_{28}	—	April 5, 2000	Socorro	LINEAR	·	9.9 km	MPC · JPL
76506	2000 GV_{28}	—	April 5, 2000	Socorro	LINEAR	KOR	3.2 km	MPC · JPL
76507	2000 GX_{28}	—	April 5, 2000	Socorro	LINEAR	KOR	3.0 km	MPC · JPL
76508	2000 GZ_{29}	—	April 5, 2000	Socorro	LINEAR	KOR	2.8 km	MPC · JPL
76509	2000 GQ_{32}	—	April 5, 2000	Socorro	LINEAR	·	4.2 km	MPC · JPL
76510	2000 GJ_{33}	—	April 5, 2000	Socorro	LINEAR	·	2.7 km	MPC · JPL
76511	2000 GT_{33}	—	April 5, 2000	Socorro	LINEAR	·	4.6 km	MPC · JPL
76512	2000 GL_{35}	—	April 5, 2000	Socorro	LINEAR	·	4.2 km	MPC · JPL
76513	2000 GY_{36}	—	April 5, 2000	Socorro	LINEAR	·	4.0 km	MPC · JPL
76514	2000 GF_{39}	—	April 5, 2000	Socorro	LINEAR	·	6.4 km	MPC · JPL
76515	2000 GQ_{39}	—	April 5, 2000	Socorro	LINEAR	EOS	4.8 km	MPC · JPL
76516	2000 GX_{39}	—	April 5, 2000	Socorro	LINEAR	THM	5.5 km	MPC · JPL
76517	2000 GT_{44}	—	April 5, 2000	Socorro	LINEAR	DOR	7.1 km	MPC · JPL
76518	2000 GY_{45}	—	April 5, 2000	Socorro	LINEAR	·	6.0 km	MPC · JPL
76519	2000 GN_{46}	—	April 5, 2000	Socorro	LINEAR	HYG	8.2 km	MPC · JPL
76520	2000 GS_{46}	—	April 5, 2000	Socorro	LINEAR	·	6.0 km	MPC · JPL
76521	2000 GK_{47}	—	April 5, 2000	Socorro	LINEAR	HYG	8.9 km	MPC · JPL
76522	2000 GD_{51}	—	April 5, 2000	Socorro	LINEAR	·	9.8 km	MPC · JPL
76523	2000 GH_{51}	—	April 5, 2000	Socorro	LINEAR	·	7.4 km	MPC · JPL
76524	2000 GV_{52}	—	April 5, 2000	Socorro	LINEAR	·	6.9 km	MPC · JPL
76525	2000 GO_{53}	—	April 5, 2000	Socorro	LINEAR	·	6.0 km	MPC · JPL
76526	2000 GS_{54}	—	April 5, 2000	Socorro	LINEAR	·	4.8 km	MPC · JPL
76527	2000 GC_{56}	—	April 5, 2000	Socorro	LINEAR	·	6.8 km	MPC · JPL
76528	2000 GB_{59}	—	April 5, 2000	Socorro	LINEAR	EUN	4.0 km	MPC · JPL
76529	2000 GA_{60}	—	April 5, 2000	Socorro	LINEAR	·	3.8 km	MPC · JPL
76530	2000 GE_{65}	—	April 5, 2000	Socorro	LINEAR	·	4.5 km	MPC · JPL
76531	2000 GT_{65}	—	April 5, 2000	Socorro	LINEAR	·	5.2 km	MPC · JPL
76532	2000 GX_{71}	—	April 5, 2000	Socorro	LINEAR	THM	6.0 km	MPC · JPL
76533	2000 GB_{73}	—	April 5, 2000	Socorro	LINEAR	·	5.8 km	MPC · JPL
76534	2000 GF_{73}	—	April 5, 2000	Socorro	LINEAR	·	9.2 km	MPC · JPL
76535	2000 GM_{73}	—	April 5, 2000	Socorro	LINEAR	EOS	4.0 km	MPC · JPL
76536	2000 GU_{74}	—	April 5, 2000	Socorro	LINEAR	·	3.9 km	MPC · JPL
76537	2000 GJ_{76}	—	April 5, 2000	Socorro	LINEAR	·	3.8 km	MPC · JPL
76538	2000 GO_{76}	—	April 5, 2000	Socorro	LINEAR	·	9.0 km	MPC · JPL
76539	2000 GN_{78}	—	April 5, 2000	Socorro	LINEAR	EOS	3.8 km	MPC · JPL
76540	2000 GL_{79}	—	April 5, 2000	Socorro	LINEAR	(21885)	6.9 km	MPC · JPL
76541	2000 GX_{79}	—	April 6, 2000	Socorro	LINEAR	·	7.4 km	MPC · JPL
76542	2000 GC_{81}	—	April 6, 2000	Socorro	LINEAR	THM	5.9 km	MPC · JPL
76543	2000 GD_{81}	—	April 13, 2000	Socorro	LINEAR	·	5.1 km	MPC · JPL
76544	2000 GZ_{82}	—	April 2, 2000	Socorro	LINEAR	·	4.4 km	MPC · JPL
76545	2000 GE_{83}	—	April 2, 2000	Socorro	LINEAR	·	4.0 km	MPC · JPL
76546	2000 GF_{83}	—	April 2, 2000	Socorro	LINEAR	HNS	4.4 km	MPC · JPL
76547	2000 GS_{83}	—	April 3, 2000	Socorro	LINEAR	·	5.0 km	MPC · JPL
76548	2000 GV_{84}	—	April 3, 2000	Socorro	LINEAR	EUN	4.1 km	MPC · JPL
76549	2000 GG_{85}	—	April 3, 2000	Socorro	LINEAR	EUN	4.2 km	MPC · JPL
76550	2000 GH_{85}	—	April 3, 2000	Socorro	LINEAR	·	5.2 km	MPC · JPL
76551	2000 GG_{88}	—	April 4, 2000	Socorro	LINEAR	·	9.9 km	MPC · JPL
76552	2000 GM_{88}	—	April 4, 2000	Socorro	LINEAR	(1298)	7.8 km	MPC · JPL
76553	2000 GD_{89}	—	April 4, 2000	Socorro	LINEAR	TEL	4.0 km	MPC · JPL
76554	2000 GK_{93}	—	April 5, 2000	Socorro	LINEAR	·	8.7 km	MPC · JPL
76555	2000 GW_{93}	—	April 5, 2000	Socorro	LINEAR	·	5.7 km	MPC · JPL
76556	2000 GV_{94}	—	April 5, 2000	Socorro	LINEAR	·	4.7 km	MPC · JPL
76557	2000 GB_{95}	—	April 6, 2000	Socorro	LINEAR	·	7.2 km	MPC · JPL
76558	2000 GC_{97}	—	April 7, 2000	Socorro	LINEAR	·	5.2 km	MPC · JPL
76559	2000 GF_{97}	—	April 7, 2000	Socorro	LINEAR	·	3.7 km	MPC · JPL
76560	2000 GR_{98}	—	April 7, 2000	Socorro	LINEAR	NAE	7.2 km	MPC · JPL
76561	2000 GG_{99}	—	April 7, 2000	Socorro	LINEAR	EOS	6.1 km	MPC · JPL
76562	2000 GW_{101}	—	April 7, 2000	Socorro	LINEAR	·	3.8 km	MPC · JPL
76563	2000 GT_{103}	—	April 7, 2000	Socorro	LINEAR	·	4.1 km	MPC · JPL
76564	2000 GO_{105}	—	April 7, 2000	Socorro	LINEAR	615 ·	7.1 km	MPC · JPL
76565	2000 GR_{106}	—	April 7, 2000	Socorro	LINEAR	·	3.4 km	MPC · JPL
76566	2000 GB_{107}	—	April 7, 2000	Socorro	LINEAR	(5)	3.3 km	MPC · JPL
76567	2000 GD_{107}	—	April 7, 2000	Socorro	LINEAR	·	6.1 km	MPC · JPL
76568	2000 GC_{111}	—	April 2, 2000	Anderson Mesa	LONEOS	ADE	8.0 km	MPC · JPL
76569	2000 GE_{111}	—	April 2, 2000	Anderson Mesa	LONEOS	·	8.7 km	MPC · JPL
76570	2000 GF_{111}	—	April 2, 2000	Anderson Mesa	LONEOS	·	8.5 km	MPC · JPL
76571	2000 GL_{112}	—	April 3, 2000	Socorro	LINEAR	PHO	2.1 km	MPC · JPL
76572	2000 GX_{113}	—	April 7, 2000	Socorro	LINEAR	·	5.6 km	MPC · JPL
76573	2000 GH_{114}	—	April 7, 2000	Socorro	LINEAR	·	4.8 km	MPC · JPL
76574	2000 GM_{114}	—	April 7, 2000	Socorro	LINEAR	·	10 km	MPC · JPL
76575	2000 GB_{115}	—	April 8, 2000	Socorro	LINEAR	KOR	3.9 km	MPC · JPL
76576	2000 GP_{118}	—	April 3, 2000	Kitt Peak	Spacewatch	·	3.3 km	MPC · JPL
76577	2000 GK_{122}	—	April 7, 2000	Kitt Peak	Spacewatch	·	5.7 km	MPC · JPL
76578	2000 GW_{123}	—	April 7, 2000	Socorro	LINEAR	·	7.8 km	MPC · JPL
76579	2000 GN_{124}	—	April 7, 2000	Socorro	LINEAR	·	4.3 km	MPC · JPL
76580	2000 GJ_{132}	—	April 10, 2000	Kitt Peak	Spacewatch	·	6.7 km	MPC · JPL
76581	2000 GC_{135}	—	April 8, 2000	Socorro	LINEAR	·	8.0 km	MPC · JPL
76582	2000 GV_{135}	—	April 8, 2000	Socorro	LINEAR	·	4.3 km	MPC · JPL
76583	2000 GF_{136}	—	April 12, 2000	Socorro	LINEAR	·	16 km	MPC · JPL
76584	2000 GC_{138}	—	April 4, 2000	Anderson Mesa	LONEOS	KOR	3.2 km	MPC · JPL
76585	2000 GA_{140}	—	April 4, 2000	Anderson Mesa	LONEOS	EOS	4.9 km	MPC · JPL
76586	2000 GW_{141}	—	April 7, 2000	Anderson Mesa	LONEOS	CYB	10 km	MPC · JPL
76587	2000 GZ_{141}	—	April 7, 2000	Anderson Mesa	LONEOS	EUN	3.1 km	MPC · JPL
76588	2000 GK_{142}	—	April 7, 2000	Anderson Mesa	LONEOS	·	4.6 km	MPC · JPL
76589	2000 GQ_{142}	—	April 7, 2000	Anderson Mesa	LONEOS	EUN	3.5 km	MPC · JPL
76590	2000 GU_{142}	—	April 7, 2000	Anderson Mesa	LONEOS	·	4.4 km	MPC · JPL
76591	2000 GJ_{143}	—	April 7, 2000	Anderson Mesa	LONEOS	·	5.0 km	MPC · JPL
76592	2000 GO_{148}	—	April 5, 2000	Socorro	LINEAR	·	4.0 km	MPC · JPL
76593	2000 GU_{154}	—	April 6, 2000	Anderson Mesa	LONEOS	·	6.1 km	MPC · JPL
76594	2000 GB_{155}	—	April 6, 2000	Anderson Mesa	LONEOS	EOS	4.8 km	MPC · JPL
76595	2000 GL_{157}	—	April 7, 2000	Socorro	LINEAR	·	3.6 km	MPC · JPL
76596	2000 GN_{157}	—	April 7, 2000	Socorro	LINEAR	slow	10 km	MPC · JPL
76597	2000 GP_{157}	—	April 7, 2000	Socorro	LINEAR	·	6.2 km	MPC · JPL
76598	2000 GS_{157}	—	April 7, 2000	Anderson Mesa	LONEOS	EOS	6.4 km	MPC · JPL
76599	2000 GU_{157}	—	April 7, 2000	Anderson Mesa	LONEOS	·	4.0 km	MPC · JPL
76600	2000 GB_{159}	—	April 7, 2000	Socorro	LINEAR	EOS	3.7 km	MPC · JPL

== 76601–76700 ==
back to top

Designation			Discovery			Properties		Ref
Permanent	Provisional	Named after	Date	Site	Discoverer(s)	Category	Diam.	Ref
76601	2000 GL_{159}	—	April 7, 2000	Socorro	LINEAR	·	7.6 km	MPC · JPL
76602	2000 GS_{159}	—	April 7, 2000	Socorro	LINEAR	EUN	3.0 km	MPC · JPL
76603	2000 GY_{159}	—	April 7, 2000	Socorro	LINEAR	·	5.6 km	MPC · JPL
76604	2000 GW_{160}	—	April 7, 2000	Anderson Mesa	LONEOS	·	3.6 km	MPC · JPL
76605	2000 GX_{161}	—	April 7, 2000	Anderson Mesa	LONEOS	·	4.7 km	MPC · JPL
76606	2000 GC_{162}	—	April 7, 2000	Anderson Mesa	LONEOS	·	4.9 km	MPC · JPL
76607	2000 GN_{162}	—	April 8, 2000	Socorro	LINEAR	slow	2.6 km	MPC · JPL
76608	2000 GK_{163}	—	April 10, 2000	Socorro	LINEAR	EOS	8.6 km	MPC · JPL
76609	2000 GQ_{163}	—	April 10, 2000	Haleakala	NEAT	EUN	2.9 km	MPC · JPL
76610	2000 GU_{164}	—	April 5, 2000	Socorro	LINEAR	EOS	3.6 km	MPC · JPL
76611	2000 GY_{165}	—	April 5, 2000	Socorro	LINEAR	KOR	8.7 km	MPC · JPL
76612	2000 GB_{167}	—	April 4, 2000	Anderson Mesa	LONEOS	·	5.2 km	MPC · JPL
76613	2000 GQ_{167}	—	April 4, 2000	Socorro	LINEAR	·	5.1 km	MPC · JPL
76614	2000 GY_{167}	—	April 4, 2000	Anderson Mesa	LONEOS	·	4.4 km	MPC · JPL
76615	2000 GP_{169}	—	April 2, 2000	Anderson Mesa	LONEOS	VER	4.3 km	MPC · JPL
76616	2000 GV_{172}	—	April 2, 2000	Anderson Mesa	LONEOS	EOS ·	4.9 km	MPC · JPL
76617	2000 GM_{173}	—	April 5, 2000	Anderson Mesa	LONEOS	·	5.7 km	MPC · JPL
76618	2000 GY_{173}	—	April 5, 2000	Anderson Mesa	LONEOS	·	3.3 km	MPC · JPL
76619	2000 GB_{174}	—	April 5, 2000	Anderson Mesa	LONEOS	EOS	4.8 km	MPC · JPL
76620	2000 GO_{175}	—	April 2, 2000	Anderson Mesa	LONEOS	JUN	2.7 km	MPC · JPL
76621	2000 GF_{176}	—	April 2, 2000	Anderson Mesa	LONEOS	·	6.0 km	MPC · JPL
76622	2000 GY_{176}	—	April 3, 2000	Kitt Peak	Spacewatch	HYG	7.2 km	MPC · JPL
76623	2000 GS_{178}	—	April 3, 2000	Socorro	LINEAR	EUN	2.8 km	MPC · JPL
76624	2000 GW_{178}	—	April 4, 2000	Socorro	LINEAR	·	8.0 km	MPC · JPL
76625	2000 GC_{181}	—	April 4, 2000	Anderson Mesa	LONEOS	·	5.2 km	MPC · JPL
76626	2000 GL_{182}	—	April 2, 2000	Kitt Peak	Spacewatch	·	7.2 km	MPC · JPL
76627	2000 GT_{182}	—	April 4, 2000	Anderson Mesa	LONEOS	·	3.5 km	MPC · JPL
76628 Kozí Hrádek	2000 HC	Kozí Hrádek	April 22, 2000	Kleť	J. Tichá, M. Tichý	·	3.7 km	MPC · JPL
76629	2000 HG	—	April 23, 2000	Kurohone	T. Kobayashi	EUN	5.3 km	MPC · JPL
76630	2000 HZ_{3}	—	April 26, 2000	Kitt Peak	Spacewatch	·	6.3 km	MPC · JPL
76631	2000 HX_{4}	—	April 27, 2000	Socorro	LINEAR	·	4.7 km	MPC · JPL
76632	2000 HJ_{6}	—	April 24, 2000	Kitt Peak	Spacewatch	THM	4.8 km	MPC · JPL
76633	2000 HL_{6}	—	April 24, 2000	Kitt Peak	Spacewatch	THM	6.2 km	MPC · JPL
76634	2000 HH_{9}	—	April 27, 2000	Socorro	LINEAR	·	4.7 km	MPC · JPL
76635	2000 HH_{10}	—	April 27, 2000	Socorro	LINEAR	·	5.3 km	MPC · JPL
76636	2000 HM_{11}	—	April 28, 2000	Socorro	LINEAR	·	5.4 km	MPC · JPL
76637	2000 HM_{12}	—	April 28, 2000	Socorro	LINEAR	THM	10 km	MPC · JPL
76638	2000 HS_{14}	—	April 29, 2000	Prescott	P. G. Comba	·	13 km	MPC · JPL
76639	2000 HP_{15}	—	April 29, 2000	Socorro	LINEAR	·	3.4 km	MPC · JPL
76640	2000 HR_{15}	—	April 29, 2000	Socorro	LINEAR	EOS	4.8 km	MPC · JPL
76641	2000 HT_{20}	—	April 27, 2000	Socorro	LINEAR	DOR	5.5 km	MPC · JPL
76642	2000 HD_{21}	—	April 27, 2000	Socorro	LINEAR	EOS	4.6 km	MPC · JPL
76643	2000 HH_{23}	—	April 30, 2000	Socorro	LINEAR	·	7.7 km	MPC · JPL
76644	2000 HY_{24}	—	April 24, 2000	Anderson Mesa	LONEOS	GEF	3.4 km	MPC · JPL
76645	2000 HF_{25}	—	April 24, 2000	Anderson Mesa	LONEOS	·	4.0 km	MPC · JPL
76646	2000 HY_{25}	—	April 24, 2000	Anderson Mesa	LONEOS	·	13 km	MPC · JPL
76647	2000 HQ_{30}	—	April 28, 2000	Socorro	LINEAR	·	8.8 km	MPC · JPL
76648	2000 HH_{31}	—	April 29, 2000	Socorro	LINEAR	AEG	10 km	MPC · JPL
76649	2000 HU_{31}	—	April 29, 2000	Socorro	LINEAR	·	11 km	MPC · JPL
76650	2000 HW_{32}	—	April 29, 2000	Socorro	LINEAR	TIR	6.6 km	MPC · JPL
76651	2000 HV_{33}	—	April 24, 2000	Anderson Mesa	LONEOS	·	9.9 km	MPC · JPL
76652	2000 HF_{35}	—	April 27, 2000	Socorro	LINEAR	·	9.4 km	MPC · JPL
76653	2000 HJ_{35}	—	April 27, 2000	Socorro	LINEAR	EOS	4.3 km	MPC · JPL
76654	2000 HM_{35}	—	April 27, 2000	Socorro	LINEAR	EOS	5.0 km	MPC · JPL
76655	2000 HK_{36}	—	April 28, 2000	Socorro	LINEAR	·	3.4 km	MPC · JPL
76656	2000 HN_{36}	—	April 28, 2000	Socorro	LINEAR	(31811)	7.8 km	MPC · JPL
76657	2000 HU_{36}	—	April 28, 2000	Socorro	LINEAR	·	4.0 km	MPC · JPL
76658	2000 HV_{36}	—	April 28, 2000	Socorro	LINEAR	·	6.1 km	MPC · JPL
76659	2000 HX_{36}	—	April 28, 2000	Socorro	LINEAR	EUN	3.6 km	MPC · JPL
76660	2000 HC_{37}	—	April 28, 2000	Socorro	LINEAR	·	8.0 km	MPC · JPL
76661	2000 HP_{39}	—	April 29, 2000	Kitt Peak	Spacewatch	EOS	5.3 km	MPC · JPL
76662	2000 HB_{41}	—	April 28, 2000	Socorro	LINEAR	·	7.9 km	MPC · JPL
76663	2000 HJ_{41}	—	April 28, 2000	Socorro	LINEAR	·	4.1 km	MPC · JPL
76664	2000 HT_{41}	—	April 28, 2000	Socorro	LINEAR	·	3.8 km	MPC · JPL
76665	2000 HZ_{41}	—	April 28, 2000	Anderson Mesa	LONEOS	·	4.8 km	MPC · JPL
76666	2000 HV_{42}	—	April 29, 2000	Socorro	LINEAR	THM	6.2 km	MPC · JPL
76667	2000 HW_{42}	—	April 29, 2000	Socorro	LINEAR	EOS	4.9 km	MPC · JPL
76668	2000 HA_{45}	—	April 26, 2000	Anderson Mesa	LONEOS	·	5.4 km	MPC · JPL
76669	2000 HD_{51}	—	April 29, 2000	Socorro	LINEAR	·	5.5 km	MPC · JPL
76670	2000 HL_{53}	—	April 29, 2000	Socorro	LINEAR	·	2.3 km	MPC · JPL
76671	2000 HD_{54}	—	April 29, 2000	Socorro	LINEAR	·	4.5 km	MPC · JPL
76672	2000 HD_{56}	—	April 24, 2000	Anderson Mesa	LONEOS	CYB	13 km	MPC · JPL
76673	2000 HL_{56}	—	April 24, 2000	Anderson Mesa	LONEOS	THM	7.4 km	MPC · JPL
76674	2000 HC_{58}	—	April 24, 2000	Kitt Peak	Spacewatch	·	7.1 km	MPC · JPL
76675	2000 HL_{61}	—	April 25, 2000	Anderson Mesa	LONEOS	·	4.6 km	MPC · JPL
76676	2000 HH_{62}	—	April 25, 2000	Kitt Peak	Spacewatch	·	3.4 km	MPC · JPL
76677	2000 HU_{62}	—	April 26, 2000	Anderson Mesa	LONEOS	·	11 km	MPC · JPL
76678	2000 HA_{63}	—	April 26, 2000	Anderson Mesa	LONEOS	HYG	6.1 km	MPC · JPL
76679	2000 HV_{63}	—	April 26, 2000	Anderson Mesa	LONEOS	·	10 km	MPC · JPL
76680	2000 HD_{64}	—	April 26, 2000	Anderson Mesa	LONEOS	·	3.2 km	MPC · JPL
76681	2000 HR_{66}	—	April 26, 2000	Kitt Peak	Spacewatch	THM	6.0 km	MPC · JPL
76682	2000 HV_{66}	—	April 26, 2000	Kitt Peak	Spacewatch	·	4.4 km	MPC · JPL
76683	2000 HN_{68}	—	April 28, 2000	Kitt Peak	Spacewatch	·	6.3 km	MPC · JPL
76684	2000 HS_{70}	—	April 26, 2000	Anderson Mesa	LONEOS	·	3.8 km	MPC · JPL
76685	2000 HA_{72}	—	April 25, 2000	Anderson Mesa	LONEOS	·	3.6 km	MPC · JPL
76686	2000 HN_{72}	—	April 26, 2000	Anderson Mesa	LONEOS	KOR	3.2 km	MPC · JPL
76687	2000 HA_{73}	—	April 27, 2000	Anderson Mesa	LONEOS	EUN	2.7 km	MPC · JPL
76688	2000 HB_{73}	—	April 27, 2000	Anderson Mesa	LONEOS	EOS	4.3 km	MPC · JPL
76689	2000 HL_{73}	—	April 27, 2000	Anderson Mesa	LONEOS	·	3.9 km	MPC · JPL
76690	2000 HZ_{73}	—	April 28, 2000	Socorro	LINEAR	·	7.4 km	MPC · JPL
76691	2000 HU_{75}	—	April 27, 2000	Socorro	LINEAR	·	6.5 km	MPC · JPL
76692	2000 HY_{75}	—	April 27, 2000	Socorro	LINEAR	·	3.5 km	MPC · JPL
76693	2000 HD_{79}	—	April 28, 2000	Anderson Mesa	LONEOS	HNS · slow	2.7 km	MPC · JPL
76694	2000 HZ_{79}	—	April 28, 2000	Anderson Mesa	LONEOS	·	10 km	MPC · JPL
76695	2000 HE_{80}	—	April 28, 2000	Anderson Mesa	LONEOS	·	6.8 km	MPC · JPL
76696	2000 HT_{81}	—	April 29, 2000	Socorro	LINEAR	TIR	4.5 km	MPC · JPL
76697	2000 HG_{83}	—	April 29, 2000	Anderson Mesa	LONEOS	·	7.8 km	MPC · JPL
76698	2000 HP_{83}	—	April 30, 2000	Anderson Mesa	LONEOS	·	6.6 km	MPC · JPL
76699	2000 HK_{85}	—	April 30, 2000	Anderson Mesa	LONEOS	·	4.3 km	MPC · JPL
76700	2000 HQ_{86}	—	April 30, 2000	Anderson Mesa	LONEOS	·	6.6 km	MPC · JPL

== 76701–76800 ==
back to top

Designation			Discovery			Properties		Ref
Permanent	Provisional	Named after	Date	Site	Discoverer(s)	Category	Diam.	Ref
76701	2000 HQ_{87}	—	April 27, 2000	Socorro	LINEAR	EOS	5.5 km	MPC · JPL
76702	2000 HR_{87}	—	April 27, 2000	Socorro	LINEAR	·	4.0 km	MPC · JPL
76703	2000 HT_{87}	—	April 27, 2000	Socorro	LINEAR	·	7.1 km	MPC · JPL
76704	2000 HT_{88}	—	April 29, 2000	Socorro	LINEAR	·	4.0 km	MPC · JPL
76705	2000 HV_{89}	—	April 29, 2000	Socorro	LINEAR	·	6.5 km	MPC · JPL
76706	2000 HV_{92}	—	April 29, 2000	Socorro	LINEAR	·	4.1 km	MPC · JPL
76707	2000 HC_{94}	—	April 29, 2000	Anderson Mesa	LONEOS	·	9.0 km	MPC · JPL
76708	2000 HE_{101}	—	April 25, 2000	Anderson Mesa	LONEOS	slow	7.3 km	MPC · JPL
76709	2000 HB_{103}	—	April 27, 2000	Anderson Mesa	LONEOS	·	4.0 km	MPC · JPL
76710	2000 HC_{105}	—	April 28, 2000	Anderson Mesa	LONEOS	·	4.3 km	MPC · JPL
76711	2000 JY_{2}	—	May 3, 2000	Socorro	LINEAR	·	5.0 km	MPC · JPL
76712	2000 JX_{4}	—	May 3, 2000	Kitt Peak	Spacewatch	EOS	3.0 km	MPC · JPL
76713 Wudia	2000 JT_{8}	Wudia	May 6, 2000	Ondřejov	M. Wolf, P. Kušnirák	·	7.8 km	MPC · JPL
76714	2000 JZ_{9}	—	May 5, 2000	Socorro	LINEAR	·	8.7 km	MPC · JPL
76715	2000 JK_{11}	—	May 3, 2000	Socorro	LINEAR	·	6.9 km	MPC · JPL
76716	2000 JF_{12}	—	May 5, 2000	Socorro	LINEAR	EUN	2.5 km	MPC · JPL
76717	2000 JP_{16}	—	May 5, 2000	Socorro	LINEAR	·	8.0 km	MPC · JPL
76718	2000 JW_{16}	—	May 5, 2000	Socorro	LINEAR	·	6.6 km	MPC · JPL
76719	2000 JJ_{18}	—	May 2, 2000	Socorro	LINEAR	·	3.2 km	MPC · JPL
76720	2000 JJ_{19}	—	May 4, 2000	Socorro	LINEAR	slow	5.2 km	MPC · JPL
76721	2000 JW_{22}	—	May 7, 2000	Socorro	LINEAR	·	8.2 km	MPC · JPL
76722	2000 JJ_{23}	—	May 7, 2000	Socorro	LINEAR	·	3.4 km	MPC · JPL
76723	2000 JL_{23}	—	May 7, 2000	Socorro	LINEAR	·	3.6 km	MPC · JPL
76724	2000 JT_{25}	—	May 7, 2000	Socorro	LINEAR	EOS	4.4 km	MPC · JPL
76725	2000 JJ_{28}	—	May 7, 2000	Socorro	LINEAR	EOS	4.1 km	MPC · JPL
76726	2000 JK_{28}	—	May 7, 2000	Socorro	LINEAR	·	5.8 km	MPC · JPL
76727	2000 JE_{30}	—	May 7, 2000	Socorro	LINEAR	EOS	6.0 km	MPC · JPL
76728	2000 JE_{36}	—	May 7, 2000	Socorro	LINEAR	URS	13 km	MPC · JPL
76729	2000 JZ_{39}	—	May 7, 2000	Socorro	LINEAR	·	5.8 km	MPC · JPL
76730	2000 JA_{40}	—	May 7, 2000	Socorro	LINEAR	·	14 km	MPC · JPL
76731	2000 JH_{46}	—	May 7, 2000	Socorro	LINEAR	EOS	5.4 km	MPC · JPL
76732	2000 JZ_{53}	—	May 6, 2000	Socorro	LINEAR	EUN	3.5 km	MPC · JPL
76733	2000 JG_{54}	—	May 6, 2000	Socorro	LINEAR	·	4.9 km	MPC · JPL
76734	2000 JK_{54}	—	May 6, 2000	Socorro	LINEAR	·	5.1 km	MPC · JPL
76735	2000 JN_{54}	—	May 6, 2000	Socorro	LINEAR	·	7.9 km	MPC · JPL
76736	2000 JA_{55}	—	May 6, 2000	Socorro	LINEAR	·	4.7 km	MPC · JPL
76737	2000 JG_{55}	—	May 6, 2000	Socorro	LINEAR	·	4.6 km	MPC · JPL
76738	2000 JV_{59}	—	May 7, 2000	Socorro	LINEAR	·	4.7 km	MPC · JPL
76739	2000 JV_{61}	—	May 7, 2000	Socorro	LINEAR	·	11 km	MPC · JPL
76740	2000 JJ_{64}	—	May 4, 2000	Anderson Mesa	LONEOS	DOR	5.5 km	MPC · JPL
76741	2000 JM_{65}	—	May 6, 2000	Socorro	LINEAR	·	4.1 km	MPC · JPL
76742	2000 JN_{65}	—	May 6, 2000	Socorro	LINEAR	·	7.2 km	MPC · JPL
76743	2000 JG_{66}	—	May 6, 2000	Socorro	LINEAR	·	6.4 km	MPC · JPL
76744	2000 JZ_{68}	—	May 1, 2000	Anderson Mesa	LONEOS	ADE	7.2 km	MPC · JPL
76745	2000 JE_{70}	—	May 3, 2000	Socorro	LINEAR	·	6.7 km	MPC · JPL
76746	2000 JJ_{70}	—	May 1, 2000	Anderson Mesa	LONEOS	·	5.0 km	MPC · JPL
76747	2000 JO_{72}	—	May 2, 2000	Anderson Mesa	LONEOS	EOS	5.8 km	MPC · JPL
76748	2000 JS_{72}	—	May 2, 2000	Anderson Mesa	LONEOS	INA	11 km	MPC · JPL
76749	2000 JV_{73}	—	May 2, 2000	Anderson Mesa	LONEOS	slow	7.8 km	MPC · JPL
76750	2000 JX_{73}	—	May 2, 2000	Kitt Peak	Spacewatch	T_{j} (2.97) · 3:2	15 km	MPC · JPL
76751	2000 JR_{79}	—	May 5, 2000	Socorro	LINEAR	·	3.1 km	MPC · JPL
76752	2000 JB_{82}	—	May 7, 2000	Anderson Mesa	LONEOS	·	3.3 km	MPC · JPL
76753	2000 JB_{83}	—	May 7, 2000	Socorro	LINEAR	·	5.9 km	MPC · JPL
76754	2000 JQ_{83}	—	May 6, 2000	Socorro	LINEAR	EOS	4.0 km	MPC · JPL
76755	2000 KD_{1}	—	May 25, 2000	Kitt Peak	Spacewatch	THM	8.0 km	MPC · JPL
76756	2000 KR_{2}	—	May 26, 2000	Socorro	LINEAR	EUP	11 km	MPC · JPL
76757	2000 KU_{5}	—	May 27, 2000	Socorro	LINEAR	526	4.5 km	MPC · JPL
76758	2000 KZ_{6}	—	May 27, 2000	Socorro	LINEAR	EOS	4.5 km	MPC · JPL
76759	2000 KA_{9}	—	May 28, 2000	Socorro	LINEAR	·	7.5 km	MPC · JPL
76760	2000 KY_{12}	—	May 28, 2000	Socorro	LINEAR	·	8.0 km	MPC · JPL
76761	2000 KY_{13}	—	May 28, 2000	Socorro	LINEAR	KOR	2.8 km	MPC · JPL
76762	2000 KH_{14}	—	May 28, 2000	Socorro	LINEAR	THM	5.7 km	MPC · JPL
76763	2000 KD_{18}	—	May 28, 2000	Socorro	LINEAR	·	4.6 km	MPC · JPL
76764	2000 KE_{24}	—	May 28, 2000	Socorro	LINEAR	·	5.7 km	MPC · JPL
76765	2000 KQ_{26}	—	May 28, 2000	Socorro	LINEAR	URS	8.7 km	MPC · JPL
76766	2000 KO_{29}	—	May 28, 2000	Socorro	LINEAR	·	6.3 km	MPC · JPL
76767	2000 KG_{30}	—	May 28, 2000	Socorro	LINEAR	·	7.3 km	MPC · JPL
76768	2000 KR_{31}	—	May 28, 2000	Socorro	LINEAR	·	3.8 km	MPC · JPL
76769	2000 KC_{34}	—	May 26, 2000	Socorro	LINEAR	GAL	4.9 km	MPC · JPL
76770	2000 KZ_{43}	—	May 26, 2000	Črni Vrh	Mikuž, H.	·	7.9 km	MPC · JPL
76771	2000 KG_{46}	—	May 27, 2000	Socorro	LINEAR	EOS	5.8 km	MPC · JPL
76772	2000 KJ_{47}	—	May 28, 2000	Socorro	LINEAR	·	7.8 km	MPC · JPL
76773	2000 KS_{53}	—	May 26, 2000	Anderson Mesa	LONEOS	·	5.3 km	MPC · JPL
76774	2000 KS_{58}	—	May 24, 2000	Anderson Mesa	LONEOS	·	5.1 km	MPC · JPL
76775	2000 KT_{58}	—	May 24, 2000	Anderson Mesa	LONEOS	·	6.1 km	MPC · JPL
76776	2000 KU_{58}	—	May 24, 2000	Anderson Mesa	LONEOS	·	5.2 km	MPC · JPL
76777	2000 KR_{59}	—	May 25, 2000	Anderson Mesa	LONEOS	EOS	6.9 km	MPC · JPL
76778	2000 KZ_{60}	—	May 25, 2000	Anderson Mesa	LONEOS	·	8.9 km	MPC · JPL
76779	2000 KA_{62}	—	May 26, 2000	Anderson Mesa	LONEOS	·	4.7 km	MPC · JPL
76780	2000 KH_{64}	—	May 26, 2000	Anderson Mesa	LONEOS	URS	9.3 km	MPC · JPL
76781	2000 KU_{65}	—	May 27, 2000	Anderson Mesa	LONEOS	·	7.9 km	MPC · JPL
76782	2000 KP_{67}	—	May 31, 2000	Anderson Mesa	LONEOS	·	5.5 km	MPC · JPL
76783	2000 KH_{71}	—	May 28, 2000	Socorro	LINEAR	·	5.9 km	MPC · JPL
76784	2000 KR_{71}	—	May 28, 2000	Socorro	LINEAR	·	3.8 km	MPC · JPL
76785	2000 KL_{72}	—	May 28, 2000	Socorro	LINEAR	·	8.2 km	MPC · JPL
76786	2000 LT_{9}	—	June 6, 2000	Socorro	LINEAR	THM · slow	8.3 km	MPC · JPL
76787	2000 LC_{13}	—	June 5, 2000	Socorro	LINEAR	·	6.1 km	MPC · JPL
76788	2000 LX_{13}	—	June 6, 2000	Socorro	LINEAR	TIR · slow	5.3 km	MPC · JPL
76789	2000 LG_{16}	—	June 8, 2000	Socorro	LINEAR	H	1.4 km	MPC · JPL
76790	2000 LR_{19}	—	June 8, 2000	Socorro	LINEAR	·	5.4 km	MPC · JPL
76791	2000 LQ_{24}	—	June 1, 2000	Socorro	LINEAR	·	12 km	MPC · JPL
76792	2000 LR_{24}	—	June 1, 2000	Socorro	LINEAR	·	5.5 km	MPC · JPL
76793	2000 LX_{26}	—	June 5, 2000	Anderson Mesa	LONEOS	·	7.5 km	MPC · JPL
76794	2000 LY_{31}	—	June 5, 2000	Anderson Mesa	LONEOS	·	6.6 km	MPC · JPL
76795	2000 LN_{32}	—	June 4, 2000	Socorro	LINEAR	·	9.1 km	MPC · JPL
76796	2000 LT_{32}	—	June 4, 2000	Socorro	LINEAR	·	4.8 km	MPC · JPL
76797	2000 LG_{36}	—	June 1, 2000	Haleakala	NEAT	·	5.5 km	MPC · JPL
76798	2000 NT_{4}	—	July 7, 2000	Socorro	LINEAR	·	9.9 km	MPC · JPL
76799	2000 OR_{34}	—	July 30, 2000	Socorro	LINEAR	·	5.3 km	MPC · JPL
76800	2000 OQ_{35}	—	July 31, 2000	Socorro	LINEAR	H · slow	3.1 km	MPC · JPL

== 76801–76900 ==
back to top

Designation			Discovery			Properties		Ref
Permanent	Provisional	Named after	Date	Site	Discoverer(s)	Category	Diam.	Ref
76801	2000 PF_{24}	—	August 2, 2000	Socorro	LINEAR	·	18 km	MPC · JPL
76802	2000 PV_{27}	—	August 9, 2000	Socorro	LINEAR	H	1.8 km	MPC · JPL
76803	2000 PK_{30}	—	August 5, 2000	Mauna Kea	M. J. Holman	other TNO	128 km	MPC · JPL
76804	2000 QE	—	August 20, 2000	Anderson Mesa	LONEOS	L5	17 km	MPC · JPL
76805	2000 QY_{14}	—	August 24, 2000	Socorro	LINEAR	3:2	10 km	MPC · JPL
76806	2000 QS_{24}	—	August 25, 2000	Socorro	LINEAR	EOS	5.9 km	MPC · JPL
76807	2000 QT_{25}	—	August 26, 2000	Socorro	LINEAR	H	1.6 km	MPC · JPL
76808	2000 QW_{34}	—	August 28, 2000	Socorro	LINEAR	H	2.0 km	MPC · JPL
76809	2000 QQ_{46}	—	August 24, 2000	Socorro	LINEAR	L5	18 km	MPC · JPL
76810	2000 QC_{50}	—	August 24, 2000	Socorro	LINEAR	HIL · 3:2	13 km	MPC · JPL
76811	2000 QK_{57}	—	August 26, 2000	Socorro	LINEAR	3:2	10 km	MPC · JPL
76812	2000 QQ_{84}	—	August 25, 2000	Socorro	LINEAR	L5	23 km	MPC · JPL
76813	2000 QC_{164}	—	August 31, 2000	Socorro	LINEAR	·	8.7 km	MPC · JPL
76814	2000 QL_{164}	—	August 31, 2000	Socorro	LINEAR	·	7.6 km	MPC · JPL
76815	2000 QE_{181}	—	August 31, 2000	Socorro	LINEAR	H	1.6 km	MPC · JPL
76816	2000 RL_{37}	—	September 3, 2000	Socorro	LINEAR	H	1.6 km	MPC · JPL
76817	2000 RX_{43}	—	September 3, 2000	Socorro	LINEAR	EOS	6.5 km	MPC · JPL
76818 Brianenke	2000 RG_{79}	Brianenke	September 8, 2000	Socorro	LINEAR	H · moon	3.9 km	MPC · JPL
76819	2000 RQ_{91}	—	September 3, 2000	Socorro	LINEAR	L5	20 km	MPC · JPL
76820	2000 RW_{105}	—	September 4, 2000	Anderson Mesa	LONEOS	L5	17 km	MPC · JPL
76821	2000 SY_{8}	—	September 21, 2000	Socorro	LINEAR	H	1.3 km	MPC · JPL
76822	2000 SA_{51}	—	September 23, 2000	Socorro	LINEAR	3:2	12 km	MPC · JPL
76823	2000 SN_{60}	—	September 24, 2000	Socorro	LINEAR	·	1.3 km	MPC · JPL
76824	2000 SA_{89}	—	September 25, 2000	Socorro	LINEAR	L5	10 km	MPC · JPL
76825	2000 SR_{125}	—	September 24, 2000	Socorro	LINEAR	·	1.9 km	MPC · JPL
76826	2000 SW_{131}	—	September 22, 2000	Socorro	LINEAR	L5 · 010	21 km	MPC · JPL
76827	2000 SC_{158}	—	September 27, 2000	Socorro	LINEAR	H	1.3 km	MPC · JPL
76828	2000 SL_{161}	—	September 28, 2000	Socorro	LINEAR	·	2.4 km	MPC · JPL
76829	2000 ST_{166}	—	September 23, 2000	Socorro	LINEAR	·	1.8 km	MPC · JPL
76830	2000 SA_{182}	—	September 19, 2000	Kvistaberg	Uppsala-DLR Asteroid Survey	L5	23 km	MPC · JPL
76831	2000 ST_{222}	—	September 27, 2000	Socorro	LINEAR	HIL · 3:2	13 km	MPC · JPL
76832	2000 SM_{226}	—	September 27, 2000	Socorro	LINEAR	H	1.4 km	MPC · JPL
76833	2000 SQ_{232}	—	September 28, 2000	Socorro	LINEAR	H	940 m	MPC · JPL
76834	2000 SA_{244}	—	September 24, 2000	Socorro	LINEAR	L5	16 km	MPC · JPL
76835	2000 SH_{255}	—	September 24, 2000	Socorro	LINEAR	L5	14 km	MPC · JPL
76836	2000 SB_{310}	—	September 26, 2000	Socorro	LINEAR	L5	18 km	MPC · JPL
76837	2000 SL_{316}	—	September 30, 2000	Socorro	LINEAR	L5	20 km	MPC · JPL
76838	2000 ST_{347}	—	September 22, 2000	Socorro	LINEAR	L5	17 km	MPC · JPL
76839	2000 SM_{354}	—	September 29, 2000	Anderson Mesa	LONEOS	H	1.2 km	MPC · JPL
76840	2000 TU_{3}	—	October 1, 2000	Socorro	LINEAR	L5	12 km	MPC · JPL
76841	2000 TC_{33}	—	October 4, 2000	Socorro	LINEAR	H	1.6 km	MPC · JPL
76842	2000 TQ_{33}	—	October 4, 2000	Socorro	LINEAR	H	2.0 km	MPC · JPL
76843	2000 TP_{41}	—	October 1, 2000	Socorro	LINEAR	H	1.7 km	MPC · JPL
76844	2000 UC_{40}	—	October 24, 2000	Socorro	LINEAR	·	1.9 km	MPC · JPL
76845	2000 VJ_{2}	—	November 1, 2000	Socorro	LINEAR	PHO	2.5 km	MPC · JPL
76846	2000 VK_{10}	—	November 1, 2000	Socorro	LINEAR	·	2.6 km	MPC · JPL
76847	2000 VX_{31}	—	November 1, 2000	Socorro	LINEAR	·	1.6 km	MPC · JPL
76848	2000 WO_{3}	—	November 17, 2000	Socorro	LINEAR	H	1.5 km	MPC · JPL
76849	2000 WL_{6}	—	November 20, 2000	Farpoint	Farpoint	·	1.5 km	MPC · JPL
76850	2000 WE_{13}	—	November 21, 2000	Socorro	LINEAR	·	2.5 km	MPC · JPL
76851	2000 WJ_{18}	—	November 21, 2000	Socorro	LINEAR	·	1.8 km	MPC · JPL
76852	2000 WD_{20}	—	November 24, 2000	Kitt Peak	Spacewatch	·	1.5 km	MPC · JPL
76853	2000 WE_{25}	—	November 20, 2000	Socorro	LINEAR	PHO	7.3 km	MPC · JPL
76854	2000 WX_{49}	—	November 25, 2000	Socorro	LINEAR	PHO	2.7 km	MPC · JPL
76855	2000 WD_{63}	—	November 28, 2000	Fountain Hills	C. W. Juels	PHO	3.3 km	MPC · JPL
76856	2000 WQ_{96}	—	November 21, 2000	Socorro	LINEAR	·	2.1 km	MPC · JPL
76857	2000 WE_{132}	—	November 18, 2000	Socorro	LINEAR	L5	33 km	MPC · JPL
76858	2000 WK_{141}	—	November 19, 2000	Socorro	LINEAR	H	1.4 km	MPC · JPL
76859	2000 WV_{145}	—	November 22, 2000	Haleakala	NEAT	H	1.7 km	MPC · JPL
76860	2000 WK_{178}	—	November 28, 2000	Kitt Peak	Spacewatch	·	2.2 km	MPC · JPL
76861	2000 WX_{185}	—	November 28, 2000	Anderson Mesa	LONEOS	H	1.8 km	MPC · JPL
76862	2000 XK_{7}	—	December 1, 2000	Socorro	LINEAR	·	3.0 km	MPC · JPL
76863	2000 XD_{13}	—	December 4, 2000	Socorro	LINEAR	·	4.2 km	MPC · JPL
76864	2000 XR_{13}	—	December 4, 2000	Socorro	LINEAR	H	3.2 km	MPC · JPL
76865	2000 XW_{38}	—	December 5, 2000	Socorro	LINEAR	H	2.7 km	MPC · JPL
76866	2000 XK_{49}	—	December 4, 2000	Socorro	LINEAR	PHO	3.8 km	MPC · JPL
76867	2000 YM_{5}	—	December 19, 2000	Haleakala	NEAT	L5	43 km	MPC · JPL
76868	2000 YC_{11}	—	December 22, 2000	Socorro	LINEAR	·	2.2 km	MPC · JPL
76869	2000 YB_{20}	—	December 27, 2000	Desert Beaver	W. K. Y. Yeung	·	1.6 km	MPC · JPL
76870	2000 YP_{21}	—	December 22, 2000	Anderson Mesa	LONEOS	·	1.7 km	MPC · JPL
76871	2000 YZ_{28}	—	December 29, 2000	Haleakala	NEAT	(2076)	1.8 km	MPC · JPL
76872	2000 YP_{30}	—	December 29, 2000	Haleakala	NEAT	·	1.3 km	MPC · JPL
76873	2000 YF_{32}	—	December 30, 2000	Socorro	LINEAR	H	1.5 km	MPC · JPL
76874	2000 YR_{32}	—	December 30, 2000	Socorro	LINEAR	·	1.5 km	MPC · JPL
76875	2000 YT_{32}	—	December 30, 2000	Socorro	LINEAR	·	2.7 km	MPC · JPL
76876	2000 YU_{32}	—	December 30, 2000	Socorro	LINEAR	·	3.6 km	MPC · JPL
76877	2000 YD_{36}	—	December 30, 2000	Socorro	LINEAR	·	1.5 km	MPC · JPL
76878	2000 YT_{44}	—	December 30, 2000	Socorro	LINEAR	·	1.8 km	MPC · JPL
76879	2000 YG_{47}	—	December 30, 2000	Socorro	LINEAR	·	1.5 km	MPC · JPL
76880	2000 YG_{51}	—	December 30, 2000	Socorro	LINEAR	·	1.8 km	MPC · JPL
76881	2000 YR_{51}	—	December 30, 2000	Socorro	LINEAR	·	1.7 km	MPC · JPL
76882	2000 YA_{54}	—	December 30, 2000	Socorro	LINEAR	·	2.3 km	MPC · JPL
76883	2000 YE_{54}	—	December 30, 2000	Socorro	LINEAR	·	1.6 km	MPC · JPL
76884	2000 YJ_{61}	—	December 30, 2000	Socorro	LINEAR	·	2.3 km	MPC · JPL
76885	2000 YB_{63}	—	December 30, 2000	Socorro	LINEAR	·	2.3 km	MPC · JPL
76886	2000 YL_{64}	—	December 30, 2000	Socorro	LINEAR	·	1.6 km	MPC · JPL
76887	2000 YM_{88}	—	December 30, 2000	Socorro	LINEAR	·	1.6 km	MPC · JPL
76888	2000 YW_{94}	—	December 30, 2000	Socorro	LINEAR	·	2.0 km	MPC · JPL
76889	2000 YK_{97}	—	December 30, 2000	Socorro	LINEAR	·	2.4 km	MPC · JPL
76890	2000 YT_{98}	—	December 30, 2000	Socorro	LINEAR	·	1.5 km	MPC · JPL
76891	2000 YM_{99}	—	December 30, 2000	Socorro	LINEAR	·	1.7 km	MPC · JPL
76892	2000 YP_{99}	—	December 30, 2000	Socorro	LINEAR	V	1.8 km	MPC · JPL
76893	2000 YQ_{99}	—	December 30, 2000	Socorro	LINEAR	·	4.0 km	MPC · JPL
76894	2000 YT_{99}	—	December 30, 2000	Socorro	LINEAR	·	1.6 km	MPC · JPL
76895	2000 YX_{103}	—	December 28, 2000	Socorro	LINEAR	·	2.0 km	MPC · JPL
76896	2000 YA_{105}	—	December 28, 2000	Socorro	LINEAR	·	2.4 km	MPC · JPL
76897	2000 YO_{105}	—	December 28, 2000	Socorro	LINEAR	·	1.9 km	MPC · JPL
76898	2000 YS_{105}	—	December 28, 2000	Socorro	LINEAR	V	2.0 km	MPC · JPL
76899	2000 YU_{105}	—	December 28, 2000	Socorro	LINEAR	·	1.9 km	MPC · JPL
76900	2000 YB_{107}	—	December 30, 2000	Socorro	LINEAR	·	4.3 km	MPC · JPL

== 76901–77000 ==
back to top

Designation			Discovery			Properties		Ref
Permanent	Provisional	Named after	Date	Site	Discoverer(s)	Category	Diam.	Ref
76901	2000 YE_{110}	—	December 30, 2000	Socorro	LINEAR	NYS	2.1 km	MPC · JPL
76902	2000 YT_{110}	—	December 30, 2000	Socorro	LINEAR	·	1.4 km	MPC · JPL
76903	2000 YV_{111}	—	December 30, 2000	Socorro	LINEAR	·	1.9 km	MPC · JPL
76904	2000 YO_{112}	—	December 30, 2000	Socorro	LINEAR	·	1.5 km	MPC · JPL
76905	2000 YU_{116}	—	December 30, 2000	Socorro	LINEAR	PHO	5.8 km	MPC · JPL
76906	2000 YC_{120}	—	December 19, 2000	Anderson Mesa	LONEOS	H	1.4 km	MPC · JPL
76907	2000 YO_{123}	—	December 28, 2000	Socorro	LINEAR	EUN	3.2 km	MPC · JPL
76908	2000 YG_{126}	—	December 29, 2000	Anderson Mesa	LONEOS	·	5.8 km	MPC · JPL
76909	2000 YK_{127}	—	December 29, 2000	Haleakala	NEAT	NYS	3.0 km	MPC · JPL
76910	2000 YX_{128}	—	December 29, 2000	Haleakala	NEAT	·	1.8 km	MPC · JPL
76911	2000 YC_{133}	—	December 30, 2000	Anderson Mesa	LONEOS	·	2.4 km	MPC · JPL
76912	2000 YZ_{135}	—	December 22, 2000	Anderson Mesa	LONEOS	·	2.3 km	MPC · JPL
76913	2000 YO_{138}	—	December 26, 2000	Kitt Peak	Spacewatch	·	2.5 km	MPC · JPL
76914	2000 YP_{138}	—	December 26, 2000	Kitt Peak	Spacewatch	NYS	1.8 km	MPC · JPL
76915	2000 YC_{139}	—	December 27, 2000	Haleakala	NEAT	H	1.5 km	MPC · JPL
76916	2001 AB	—	January 1, 2001	Kitt Peak	Spacewatch	·	2.1 km	MPC · JPL
76917	2001 AN_{4}	—	January 2, 2001	Socorro	LINEAR	V	1.5 km	MPC · JPL
76918	2001 AC_{5}	—	January 2, 2001	Socorro	LINEAR	·	1.8 km	MPC · JPL
76919	2001 AE_{12}	—	January 2, 2001	Socorro	LINEAR	·	3.8 km	MPC · JPL
76920	2001 AM_{12}	—	January 2, 2001	Socorro	LINEAR	V	1.6 km	MPC · JPL
76921	2001 AA_{15}	—	January 2, 2001	Socorro	LINEAR	·	1.7 km	MPC · JPL
76922	2001 AH_{15}	—	January 2, 2001	Socorro	LINEAR	ERI	3.8 km	MPC · JPL
76923	2001 AN_{16}	—	January 2, 2001	Socorro	LINEAR	·	7.9 km	MPC · JPL
76924	2001 AJ_{21}	—	January 3, 2001	Socorro	LINEAR	·	1.8 km	MPC · JPL
76925	2001 AQ_{21}	—	January 3, 2001	Socorro	LINEAR	·	1.6 km	MPC · JPL
76926	2001 AA_{24}	—	January 3, 2001	Socorro	LINEAR	PHO	2.5 km	MPC · JPL
76927	2001 AJ_{25}	—	January 4, 2001	Socorro	LINEAR	·	3.2 km	MPC · JPL
76928	2001 AP_{25}	—	January 5, 2001	Socorro	LINEAR	H	1.9 km	MPC · JPL
76929	2001 AX_{34}	—	January 4, 2001	Socorro	LINEAR	H	2.1 km	MPC · JPL
76930	2001 AE_{39}	—	January 2, 2001	Kitt Peak	Spacewatch	·	2.0 km	MPC · JPL
76931	2001 AB_{40}	—	January 3, 2001	Anderson Mesa	LONEOS	·	1.9 km	MPC · JPL
76932	2001 AN_{42}	—	January 4, 2001	Anderson Mesa	LONEOS	·	1.9 km	MPC · JPL
76933	2001 AE_{44}	—	January 6, 2001	Socorro	LINEAR	·	1.6 km	MPC · JPL
76934	2001 AS_{44}	—	January 15, 2001	Oizumi	T. Kobayashi	·	1.8 km	MPC · JPL
76935	2001 AY_{44}	—	January 15, 2001	Oizumi	T. Kobayashi	·	2.6 km	MPC · JPL
76936	2001 AF_{49}	—	January 15, 2001	Socorro	LINEAR	·	1.8 km	MPC · JPL
76937	2001 BA_{1}	—	January 17, 2001	Oizumi	T. Kobayashi	(2076)	1.9 km	MPC · JPL
76938	2001 BR_{1}	—	January 17, 2001	Kitt Peak	Spacewatch	·	1.3 km	MPC · JPL
76939	2001 BF_{3}	—	January 17, 2001	Socorro	LINEAR	·	7.0 km	MPC · JPL
76940	2001 BR_{3}	—	January 18, 2001	Socorro	LINEAR	·	1.6 km	MPC · JPL
76941	2001 BA_{5}	—	January 18, 2001	Socorro	LINEAR	V	1.7 km	MPC · JPL
76942	2001 BM_{13}	—	January 21, 2001	Socorro	LINEAR	·	1.6 km	MPC · JPL
76943	2001 BS_{14}	—	January 21, 2001	Oizumi	T. Kobayashi	·	2.3 km	MPC · JPL
76944	2001 BH_{15}	—	January 21, 2001	Oizumi	T. Kobayashi	·	2.1 km	MPC · JPL
76945	2001 BX_{17}	—	January 19, 2001	Socorro	LINEAR	·	2.9 km	MPC · JPL
76946	2001 BQ_{18}	—	January 19, 2001	Socorro	LINEAR	·	2.4 km	MPC · JPL
76947	2001 BF_{19}	—	January 19, 2001	Socorro	LINEAR	·	1.6 km	MPC · JPL
76948	2001 BH_{20}	—	January 19, 2001	Socorro	LINEAR	slow	1.8 km	MPC · JPL
76949	2001 BJ_{20}	—	January 19, 2001	Socorro	LINEAR	·	1.6 km	MPC · JPL
76950	2001 BU_{26}	—	January 20, 2001	Socorro	LINEAR	V	1.4 km	MPC · JPL
76951	2001 BV_{27}	—	January 20, 2001	Socorro	LINEAR	·	2.7 km	MPC · JPL
76952	2001 BY_{27}	—	January 20, 2001	Socorro	LINEAR	·	2.8 km	MPC · JPL
76953	2001 BB_{28}	—	January 20, 2001	Socorro	LINEAR	·	1.8 km	MPC · JPL
76954	2001 BJ_{28}	—	January 20, 2001	Socorro	LINEAR	·	2.9 km	MPC · JPL
76955	2001 BK_{31}	—	January 20, 2001	Socorro	LINEAR	·	2.5 km	MPC · JPL
76956	2001 BQ_{32}	—	January 20, 2001	Socorro	LINEAR	·	1.9 km	MPC · JPL
76957	2001 BV_{32}	—	January 20, 2001	Socorro	LINEAR	NYS	2.5 km	MPC · JPL
76958	2001 BZ_{32}	—	January 20, 2001	Socorro	LINEAR	RAF	2.3 km	MPC · JPL
76959	2001 BA_{33}	—	January 20, 2001	Socorro	LINEAR	·	2.0 km	MPC · JPL
76960	2001 BG_{33}	—	January 20, 2001	Socorro	LINEAR	·	2.1 km	MPC · JPL
76961	2001 BT_{33}	—	January 20, 2001	Socorro	LINEAR	·	1.1 km	MPC · JPL
76962	2001 BS_{34}	—	January 20, 2001	Socorro	LINEAR	·	1.7 km	MPC · JPL
76963	2001 BX_{35}	—	January 18, 2001	Socorro	LINEAR	·	1.4 km	MPC · JPL
76964	2001 BZ_{38}	—	January 19, 2001	Kitt Peak	Spacewatch	·	2.2 km	MPC · JPL
76965	2001 BH_{45}	—	January 20, 2001	Socorro	LINEAR	·	2.9 km	MPC · JPL
76966	2001 BT_{45}	—	January 21, 2001	Socorro	LINEAR	·	1.2 km	MPC · JPL
76967	2001 BQ_{47}	—	January 21, 2001	Socorro	LINEAR	·	2.1 km	MPC · JPL
76968	2001 BW_{49}	—	January 21, 2001	Socorro	LINEAR	·	1.8 km	MPC · JPL
76969	2001 BX_{49}	—	January 21, 2001	Socorro	LINEAR	·	2.4 km	MPC · JPL
76970	2001 BY_{50}	—	January 28, 2001	Oizumi	T. Kobayashi	V	1.4 km	MPC · JPL
76971	2001 BA_{51}	—	January 28, 2001	Oizumi	T. Kobayashi	EUN	3.2 km	MPC · JPL
76972	2001 BM_{51}	—	January 16, 2001	Kitt Peak	Spacewatch	·	2.9 km	MPC · JPL
76973	2001 BT_{53}	—	January 17, 2001	Haleakala	NEAT	·	3.4 km	MPC · JPL
76974	2001 BO_{54}	—	January 18, 2001	Kitt Peak	Spacewatch	V	1.5 km	MPC · JPL
76975	2001 BJ_{56}	—	January 19, 2001	Socorro	LINEAR	MAR	2.9 km	MPC · JPL
76976	2001 BK_{58}	—	January 21, 2001	Socorro	LINEAR	·	1.6 km	MPC · JPL
76977	2001 BB_{60}	—	January 26, 2001	Socorro	LINEAR	·	1.9 km	MPC · JPL
76978	2001 BY_{60}	—	January 29, 2001	Socorro	LINEAR	·	3.1 km	MPC · JPL
76979	2001 BT_{61}	—	January 31, 2001	Desert Beaver	W. K. Y. Yeung	EUN	2.9 km	MPC · JPL
76980	2001 BS_{63}	—	January 29, 2001	Socorro	LINEAR	·	1.7 km	MPC · JPL
76981	2001 BS_{65}	—	January 26, 2001	Socorro	LINEAR	·	3.2 km	MPC · JPL
76982	2001 BV_{65}	—	January 26, 2001	Socorro	LINEAR	fast	1.6 km	MPC · JPL
76983	2001 BQ_{66}	—	January 26, 2001	Socorro	LINEAR	MAR	3.7 km	MPC · JPL
76984	2001 BZ_{66}	—	January 29, 2001	Socorro	LINEAR	·	2.3 km	MPC · JPL
76985	2001 BM_{68}	—	January 31, 2001	Socorro	LINEAR	·	2.4 km	MPC · JPL
76986	2001 BY_{68}	—	January 31, 2001	Socorro	LINEAR	·	2.8 km	MPC · JPL
76987	2001 BE_{69}	—	January 31, 2001	Socorro	LINEAR	NYS	2.3 km	MPC · JPL
76988	2001 BQ_{69}	—	January 31, 2001	Socorro	LINEAR	·	1.3 km	MPC · JPL
76989	2001 BR_{69}	—	January 31, 2001	Socorro	LINEAR	·	1.5 km	MPC · JPL
76990	2001 BO_{70}	—	January 30, 2001	Socorro	LINEAR	PHO	2.7 km	MPC · JPL
76991	2001 BJ_{72}	—	January 31, 2001	Socorro	LINEAR	EUN	7.5 km	MPC · JPL
76992	2001 BR_{72}	—	January 27, 2001	Haleakala	NEAT	EUN	2.9 km	MPC · JPL
76993	2001 BB_{73}	—	January 27, 2001	Haleakala	NEAT	·	4.6 km	MPC · JPL
76994	2001 BW_{73}	—	January 29, 2001	Kvistaberg	Uppsala-DLR Asteroid Survey	·	2.3 km	MPC · JPL
76995	2001 BQ_{75}	—	January 26, 2001	Kitt Peak	Spacewatch	·	3.2 km	MPC · JPL
76996	2001 BN_{77}	—	January 26, 2001	Socorro	LINEAR	·	3.6 km	MPC · JPL
76997	2001 BG_{80}	—	January 21, 2001	Socorro	LINEAR	·	4.1 km	MPC · JPL
76998	2001 BJ_{82}	—	January 18, 2001	Socorro	LINEAR	·	2.0 km	MPC · JPL
76999	2001 CN_{2}	—	February 1, 2001	Socorro	LINEAR	·	1.5 km	MPC · JPL
77000	2001 CU_{2}	—	February 1, 2001	Socorro	LINEAR	·	1.8 km	MPC · JPL

back to top

== See also ==
- Meanings of minor-planet names: 76001–77000
