= Uppsala–DLR Asteroid Survey =

Astronomical survey

UAO-DLR Asteroid Survey
- Alternative names: Uppsala-DLR Asteroid Survey

Minor planets discovered: 261
see § List of discovered minor planets

The Uppsala–DLR Asteroid Survey (UDAS, also known as UAO–DLR Asteroid Survey) is an astronomical survey, dedicated for the search and follow–up characterization of asteroids and comets. UDAS puts a special emphasis on near-Earth objects (NEOs) in co-operation and support of global efforts in NEO-research, initiated by the Working Group on Near-Earth Objects of the International Astronomical Union (IAU), and the Spaceguard Foundation. UDAS began regular observations in September 1999, with some test runs during 1998. Discoveries of NEOs are reported to the Minor Planet Center (MPC).

It is a kind of follow-on programme to ODAS, which had to close due to lack of further financial support. It should also not be confused with the Uppsala–DLR Trojan Survey (UDTS), which was conducted a few years before UDAS was launched.

UAO stands for Uppsala Astronomical Observatory, Uppsala, Sweden. DLR stands for the Deutschen Zentrum für Luft- und Raumfahrt, the German Aerospace Center.

The founder of Lap Power Claes Wellton-Persson has contributed to the project.

== List of discovered minor planets ==
The MPC credits the Uppsala–DLR Asteroid Survey with the discovery of the following numbered minor planets during 1999–2005.

13437 Wellton-Persson	28 November 1999	list
(15141) 2000 EP_{106}	11 March 2000	list
(17244) 2000 FF_{50}	28 March 2000	list
(20709) 1999 XM_{8}	2 December 1999	list
(20756) 2000 BC_{19}	27 January 2000	list
(20763) 2000 FQ_{9}	31 March 2000	list
(24181) 1999 XN_{8}	2 December 1999	list
(25441) 1999 WG_{8}	28 November 1999	list
(27592) 2001 AL_{44}	14 January 2001	list
(31878) 2000 FR_{7}	29 March 2000	list
(36778) 2000 SU_{1}	19 September 2000	list
(41503) 2000 QG_{148}	26 August 2000	list
(45026) 1999 WE_{8}	28 November 1999	list
(51164) 2000 HR_{62}	25 April 2000	list
(57987) 2002 QQ_{6}	19 August 2002	list
(60637) 2000 FX_{30}	29 March 2000	list
(61730) 2000 QJ_{148}	27 August 2000	list
(62003) 2000 RB_{38}	5 September 2000	list
(62004) 2000 RG_{38}	5 September 2000	list
(65259) 2002 GP	3 April 2002	list
(65386) 2002 QS_{6}	20 August 2002	list
(68949) 2002 QN_{6}	19 August 2002	list
(71383) 2000 AH_{151}	5 January 2000	list
(72278) 2001 AZ_{51}	12 January 2001	list
(72992) 2002 EM_{10}	15 March 2002	list

(75080) 1999 VP_{24}	12 November 1999	list
(75226) 1999 WF_{3}	19 November 1999	list
(75236) 1999 WB_{8}	28 November 1999	list
(76276) 2000 EQ_{114}	9 March 2000	list
(76277) 2000 ER_{114}	9 March 2000	list
(76391) 2000 FP_{7}	28 March 2000	list
(76410) 2000 FC_{15}	29 March 2000	list
(76830) 2000 SA_{182}	19 September 2000	list
(76994) 2001 BW_{73}	29 January 2001	list
(77187) 2001 FY_{9}	22 March 2001	list
(77188) 2001 FZ_{9}	22 March 2001	list
(78541) 2002 RV_{117}	2 September 2002	list
(78818) 2003 QR_{5}	17 August 2003	list
(81207) 2000 FD_{15}	29 March 2000	list
(83023) 2001 QG_{178}	24 August 2001	list
(84196) 2002 RW_{117}	2 September 2002	list
(84530) 2002 UC_{11}	29 October 2002	list
(84686) 2002 VG_{102}	12 November 2002	list
(86895) 2000 HW_{34}	25 April 2000	list
(88222) 2001 AY_{51}	15 January 2001	list
(89911) 2002 ER_{8}	9 March 2002	list
(90035) 2002 UQ_{34}	31 October 2002	list
(92943) 2000 RD_{38}	5 September 2000	list
(92944) 2000 RK_{38}	5 September 2000	list
(95794) 2003 FN_{21}	25 March 2003	list

(95871) 2003 GY_{34}	8 April 2003	list
(97184) 1999 WG_{3}	19 November 1999	list
(97674) 2000 FJ_{50}	31 March 2000	list
(99508) 2002 EQ_{8}	9 March 2002	list
(99509) 2002 EL_{9}	14 March 2002	list
(104440) 2000 FC_{74}	31 March 2000	list
(105405) 2000 QM_{148}	27 August 2000	list
(105885) 2000 SW_{180}	17 September 2000	list
(108918) 2001 PZ_{14}	13 August 2001	list
(109352) 2001 QR_{153}	18 August 2001	list
(111814) 2002 CW_{299}	10 February 2002	list
(112637) 2002 PK_{80}	6 August 2002	list
(113308) 2002 RM_{187}	11 September 2002	list
(113309) 2002 RN_{187}	11 September 2002	list
(113625) 2002 TD_{65}	2 October 2002	list
(114002) 2002 UP_{34}	31 October 2002	list
(114030) 2002 VD_{7}	2 November 2002	list
(115305) 2003 SR_{209}	24 September 2003	list
(115480) 2003 UC_{11}	19 October 2003	list
(115504) 2003 UH_{29}	23 October 2003	list
(115705) 2003 UU_{166}	21 October 2003	list
(119929) 2002 FE_{7}	24 March 2002	list
(119933) 2002 GN	3 April 2002	list
(119969) 2002 UU_{17}	30 October 2002	list
(122600) 2000 RE_{38}	5 September 2000	list

(123816) 2001 BU_{73}	29 January 2001	list
(125265) 2001 UT_{222}	23 October 2001	list
(127003) 2002 GO	3 April 2002	list
(127004) 2002 GW_{1}	3 April 2002	list
(127591) 2003 BF_{6}	23 January 2003	list
(127750) 2003 FV_{16}	23 March 2003	list
(128603) 2004 QP_{13}	22 August 2004	list
(128609) 2004 QB_{19}	22 August 2004	list
(130564) 2000 RC_{38}	5 September 2000	list
(130565) 2000 RH_{38}	5 September 2000	list
(132149) 2002 CN_{287}	9 February 2002	list
(137635) 1999 WD_{8}	28 November 1999	list
(138200) 2000 EW_{137}	10 March 2000	list
(138955) 2001 BX_{73}	29 January 2001	list
(140858) 2001 UU_{222}	24 October 2001	list
(142031) 2002 QR_{6}	20 August 2002	list
(142811) 2002 UX_{36}	31 October 2002	list
(142833) 2002 VC_{12}	2 November 2002	list
(142834) 2002 VD_{12}	2 November 2002	list
(143362) 2003 BC_{6}	23 January 2003	list
(143700) 2003 UF_{57}	26 October 2003	list
(144301) 2004 DK_{4}	16 February 2004	list
(146055) 2000 EO_{114}	9 March 2000	list
(146696) 2001 VZ_{71}	12 November 2001	list
(147316) 2003 BJ_{6}	23 January 2003	list

(148518) 2001 PW_{28}	13 August 2001	list
(149313) 2002 UT_{32}	30 October 2002	list
(151499) 2002 JL_{97}	6 May 2002	list
(154107) 2002 EL_{10}	15 March 2002	list
(154306) 2002 UV_{32}	30 October 2002	list
(156274) 2001 VY_{71}	12 November 2001	list
(156601) 2002 GT_{78}	9 April 2002	list
(158524) 2002 GV_{1}	2 April 2002	list
(158624) 2003 BD_{6}	23 January 2003	list
(159655) 2002 DR_{19}	21 February 2002	list
(159899) 2004 TB_{282}	12 October 2004	list
(160231) 2002 HA	16 April 2002	list
(160292) 2003 DM_{6}	20 February 2003	list
(161136) 2002 RT_{117}	1 September 2002	list
(161260) 2003 FU_{16}	23 March 2003	list
(162568) 2000 RF_{38}	5 September 2000	list
(163638) 2002 UN_{46}	31 October 2002	list
(166528) 2002 RV_{3}	1 September 2002	list
(167230) 2003 UJ_{57}	26 October 2003	list
(169801) 2002 QP_{6}	19 August 2002	list
(169931) 2002 TW_{10}	1 October 2002	list
(170016) 2002 UY_{10}	28 October 2002	list
(172325) 2002 UW_{32}	31 October 2002	list
(173579) 2001 BT_{73}	29 January 2001	list
(174240) 2002 RR_{130}	10 September 2002	list

(174369) 2002 UD_{11}	29 October 2002	list
(174373) 2002 UW_{36}	31 October 2002	list
(174734) 2003 UO_{190}	23 October 2003	list
(176764) 2002 RO_{187}	11 September 2002	list
(177195) 2003 UL_{29}	23 October 2003	list
(177583) 2004 GT_{9}	10 April 2004	list
(178668) 2000 QL_{148}	27 August 2000	list
(179738) 2002 RB_{118}	5 September 2002	list
(179907) 2002 VL_{20}	5 November 2002	list
(180218) 2003 UB_{29}	22 October 2003	list
(182126) 2000 RJ_{38}	5 September 2000	list
(183503) 2003 FP_{12}	22 March 2003	list
(186421) 2002 RZ_{6}	2 September 2002	list
(189143) 2002 GU_{1}	2 April 2002	list
(189857) 2003 GV_{55}	4 April 2003	list
(189888) 2003 SQ_{17}	17 September 2003	list
(189951) 2003 UX_{23}	22 October 2003	list
(195228) 2002 DJ_{18}	21 February 2002	list
(195730) 2002 PL_{80}	6 August 2002	list
(196070) 2002 TA_{65}	2 October 2002	list
(196071) 2002 TE_{65}	2 October 2002	list
(196403) 2003 GW_{34}	7 April 2003	list
(196641) 2003 SP_{17}	17 September 2003	list
(196967) 2003 UK_{57}	27 October 2003	list
(201307) 2002 TC_{65}	2 October 2002	list

(201549) 2003 RN	1 September 2003	list
(201569) 2003 SM_{47}	17 September 2003	list
(201668) 2003 UG_{57}	26 October 2003	list
(202261) 2005 AM_{54}	15 January 2005	list
(203217) 2001 FX_{9}	21 March 2001	list
(203590) 2002 CC_{275}	9 February 2002	list
(203753) 2002 RY_{117}	2 September 2002	list
(208200) 2000 RA_{38}	5 September 2000	list
(209158) 2003 UJ_{29}	23 October 2003	list
(211257) 2002 RJ	1 September 2002	list
(211809) 2004 DO_{34}	19 February 2004	list
(213838) 2003 RF_{27}	4 September 2003	list
(217169) 2002 QA_{10}	19 August 2002	list
(217238) 2003 HT_{5}	21 April 2003	list
(218261) 2003 BB_{6}	23 January 2003	list
(218293) 2003 PP_{11}	8 August 2003	list
(220321) 2003 FR_{12}	22 March 2003	list
(220496) 2004 DB_{1}	16 February 2004	list
(223224) 2003 DN_{7}	21 February 2003	list
(223348) 2003 RH_{9}	3 September 2003	list
(226281) 2003 BG_{6}	23 January 2003	list
(226299) 2003 BJ_{69}	29 January 2003	list
(226780) 2004 RO_{144}	8 September 2004	list
(228658) 2002 GP_{2}	4 April 2002	list
(229032) 2004 DN_{34}	18 February 2004	list

(230139) 2001 PY_{14}	13 August 2001	list
(230483) 2002 TB_{65}	2 October 2002	list
(230601) 2003 FQ_{12}	22 March 2003	list
(234670) 2002 GM	2 April 2002	list
(234928) 2002 UB_{11}	28 October 2002	list
(234939) 2002 VM_{20}	5 November 2002	list
(235283) 2003 UC_{29}	22 October 2003	list
(238135) 2003 QL_{71}	24 August 2003	list
(238206) 2003 UK_{29}	23 October 2003	list
(239975) 2001 QS_{269}	19 August 2001	list
(240254) 2002 VN_{18}	2 November 2002	list
(243936) 2001 PA_{15}	13 August 2001	list
(244275) 2002 EG_{9}	12 March 2002	list
(245263) 2005 AH_{29}	14 January 2005	list
(245271) 2005 AE_{82}	9 January 2005	list
(252740) 2002 CO_{315}	14 February 2002	list
(253046) 2002 SC_{51}	25 September 2002	list
(253619) 2003 UZ_{66}	23 October 2003	list
(253689) 2003 UR_{251}	25 October 2003	list
(254170) 2004 QX_{14}	21 August 2004	list
(257856) 2000 QN_{148}	27 August 2000	list
(258715) 2002 GX_{78}	10 April 2002	list
(260454) 2005 AL_{29}	15 January 2005	list
(264423) 2000 QA_{231}	31 August 2000	list
(264771) 2002 GC_{10}	15 April 2002	list

(264772) 2002 GS_{78}	9 April 2002	list
(265086) 2003 SS_{209}	25 September 2003	list
(270675) 2002 QB_{10}	19 August 2002	list
(271125) 2003 SK_{47}	17 September 2003	list
(275728) 2001 BS_{73}	29 January 2001	list
(276353) 2002 UY_{20}	28 October 2002	list
(276364) 2002 VN_{20}	5 November 2002	list
(276760) 2004 GA_{19}	10 April 2004	list
(279834) 2000 SZ_{181}	19 September 2000	list
(282408) 2003 UW_{8}	18 October 2003	list
(285614) 2000 QB_{231}	31 August 2000	list
(286594) 2002 CJ_{275}	9 February 2002	list
(287057) 2002 RG	1 September 2002	list
(287058) 2002 RH	1 September 2002	list
(287926) 2003 UF_{23}	22 October 2003	list
(298799) 2004 QC_{19}	22 August 2004	list
(302807) 2003 BE_{6}	23 January 2003	list
(306768) 2001 AX_{51}	15 January 2001	list
(307003) 2001 WJ_{100}	16 November 2001	list
(307344) 2002 RX_{117}	2 September 2002	list
(307623) 2003 SL_{47}	17 September 2003	list
(307695) 2003 UG_{29}	23 October 2003	list
(310677) 2002 FE_{41}	16 March 2002	list
(310687) 2002 GA_{110}	9 April 2002	list
(310809) 2002 UA_{11}	28 October 2002	list

(314053) 2005 AG_{29}	14 January 2005	list
(318413) 2005 AK_{29}	14 January 2005	list
(323096) 2002 VE_{102}	11 November 2002	list
(323301) 2003 UG_{23}	22 October 2003	list
(323302) 2003 UF_{29}	23 October 2003	list
(329463) 2002 QO_{6}	19 August 2002	list
(329608) 2003 GD_{40}	8 April 2003	list
(329805) 2004 RH_{15}	6 September 2004	list
(331678) 2002 QC_{10}	20 August 2002	list
(334619) 2002 UA_{73}	30 October 2002	list
(338019) 2002 GT_{5}	15 March 2002	list
(338402) 2003 BH_{6}	23 January 2003	list
(338503) 2003 PO_{11}	5 August 2003	list
(338613) 2003 SQ_{209}	24 September 2003	list
(338772) 2003 UQ_{251}	25 October 2003	list
(344149) 2000 QH_{148}	27 August 2000	list
(344994) 2005 AN_{29}	15 January 2005	list
(350155) 2011 SZ_{137}	30 September 2003	list
(350846) 2002 GU_{56}	6 April 2002	list
(357230) 2002 JO_{123}	6 April 2002	list
(357282) 2002 SY_{66}	29 September 2002	list
(360492) 2002 VF_{102}	11 November 2002	list
(366629) 2003 SA_{44}	7 September 2003	list
(373789) 2002 UU_{32}	30 October 2002	list
(377130) 2003 GX_{34}	8 April 2003	list

(377344) 2004 QQ_{19}	23 August 2004	list
(380316) 2002 GW_{78}	9 April 2002	list
(402035) 2003 SO_{209}	24 September 2003	list
(413112) 2001 VA_{72}	12 November 2001	list
(416053) 2002 GV_{97}	9 April 2002	list
(422962) 2003 BB_{77}	29 January 2003	list
(434122) 2002 QT_{6}	20 August 2002	list
(437634) 2014 BX_{34}	21 February 2003	list
(455684) 2005 EY_{67}	4 March 2005	list
(469530) 2003 SN_{209}	24 September 2003	list
(481033) 2005 AM_{29}	15 January 2005	list

== See also ==
- List of asteroid-discovering observatories
- List of minor planet discoverers § Discovering dedicated institutions
- Uppsala–ESO Survey of Asteroids and Comets, UESAC
