= Meanings of minor-planet names: 75001–76000 =

As minor planet discoveries are confirmed, they are given a permanent number by the IAU's Minor Planet Center (MPC), and the discoverers can then submit names for them, following the IAU's naming conventions. The list below concerns those minor planets in the specified number-range that have received names, and explains the meanings of those names.

Official naming citations of newly named small Solar System bodies are approved and published in a bulletin by IAU's Working Group for Small Bodies Nomenclature (WGSBN). Before May 2021, citations were published in MPC's Minor Planet Circulars for many decades. Recent citations can also be found on the JPL Small-Body Database (SBDB). Until his death in 2016, German astronomer Lutz D. Schmadel compiled these citations into the Dictionary of Minor Planet Names (DMP) and regularly updated the collection.

Based on Paul Herget's The Names of the Minor Planets, Schmadel also researched the unclear origin of numerous asteroids, most of which had been named prior to World War II. This article incorporates text from this source, which is in the public domain: SBDB New namings may only be added to this list below after official publication as the preannouncement of names is condemned. The WGSBN publishes a comprehensive guideline for the naming rules of non-cometary small Solar System bodies.

== 75001–75100 ==
Named minor planet	Provisional	This minor planet was named for...	Ref; Catalog
75009 Petervereš	1999 UC	Peter Vereš (born 1982), a Slovak astronomer at the Minor Planet Center. He graduated from Comenius University in Bratislava, observed at Modra Observatory, co-discovered many asteroids and comets with the Pan-STARRS survey (he is not directly credited as a discoverer), and simulated near-Earth object discoveries with the LSST at JPL (Src).	JPL · 75009
75058 Hanau	1999 VK_{5}	The German city of Hanau, famous as the birthplace of the Brothers Grimm	JPL · 75058
75063 Koestler	1999 VO_{8}	Arthur Koestler (1905–1983), a Hungarian British author and journalist	JPL · 75063
75072 Timerskine	1999 VU_{19}	Timothy Joseph Erskine (born 1959), American needle safety technologist, amateur astronomer, musician, artist, and philanthropist	JPL · 75072

== 75101–75200 ==
back to top

Named minor planet	Provisional	This minor planet was named for...	Ref; Catalog
75190 Segreliliana	1999 VD_{169}	Asteroid 75190 honors Auschwitz survivor Liliana Segre (born 1930) who holds the same concentration camp number. In January 2018, she was appointed Senator for life by the Italian President for the poignant testimony as a captive child in the Nazi concentration camps during World War II. She devoted her life to witnessing and increasing awareness of the Holocaust so that it does not happen again.	JPL · 75190

== 75201–75300 ==
back to top

Named minor planet	Provisional	This minor planet was named for...	Ref; Catalog
75223 Wupatki	1999 WP_{1}	Wupatki pueblo served as a cultural and trade center situated in one of the warmest driest places on the Colorado Plateau in northern Arizona. The red rock walls originally contained 100 rooms, a community room and ball court. It was built by the Ancient Pueblo People some 800 years ago.	JPL · 75223
75225 Corradoaugias	1999 WD_{3}	Corrado Augias (1935–2026) was an Italian journalist, writer, author and TV host.	JPL · 75225

== 75301–75400 ==
back to top

Named minor planet	Provisional	This minor planet was named for...	Ref; Catalog
75308 Shoin	1999 XY_{37}	Yoshida Shōin (1830–1859), a Japanese political scientist, executed for his anti-shogunate ideology, and whose teachings played an important role in the success of the Meiji Restoration	JPL · 75308

== 75401–75500 ==
back to top

Named minor planet	Provisional	This minor planet was named for...	Ref; Catalog
75423 Gladyswest	1999 XO_{119}	Gladys West, American mathematician.	IAU · 75423

== 75501–75600 ==
back to top

Named minor planet	Provisional	This minor planet was named for...	Ref; Catalog
75555 Wonaszek	1999 YW_{14}	Antal Wonaszek (1871–1902), a Hungarian astronomer and director of the Kiskartal Observatory during 1897–1902. His main field of research was the observation of clouds in Jupiter's atmosphere and the study of irregularities in Saturn's rings. He also made observations of the Sun, Moon and comets	JPL · 75555
75562 Wilkening	1999 YV_{22}	Laurel L. Wilkening, (1944–2019), meteoriticist who served on numerous commissions related to the US space program.	JPL · 75562
75564 Audubon	2000 AJ	John James Audubon (1785–1851), a Franco-American ornithologist, naturalist, and painter	JPL · 75564
75569 IRSOL	2000 AD_{2}	IRSOL (Istituto Ricerche Solari Locarno or Solar Research Institute of Locarno), located in Locarno, Switzerland, is a leading observatory in the field of solar spectropolarimetry. It is associated with the University of Lugano (Src)	JPL · 75569
75570 Jenőwigner	2000 AP_{4}	Eugene Wigner (1902–1995), a Hungarian-American physicist and Nobelist. This minor planet was discovered on the fifth anniversary of his death.	JPL · 75570
75591 Stonemose	2000 AN_{18}	Vickie Stone Moseley (born 1957) is a friend and partner of Alan Hale. She inadvertently "re-discovered" this asteroid while examining images of (4151) Alanhale that were taken during the course of developing an international educational program on the small bodies of the Solar System.	IAU · 75591

== 75601–75700 ==
back to top

Named minor planet	Provisional	This minor planet was named for...	Ref; Catalog
There are no named minor planets in this number range

== 75701–75800 ==
back to top

Named minor planet	Provisional	This minor planet was named for...	Ref; Catalog
There are no named minor planets in this number range

== 75801–75900 ==
back to top

Named minor planet	Provisional	This minor planet was named for...	Ref; Catalog
75823 Csokonai	2000 BJ_{15}	Mihály Csokonai Vitéz (1773–1805) was one of the greatest Hungarian poets. His works reflect great knowledge of philosophy, politics and the arts of his time. This minor planet was discovered on the 195th anniversary of his death.	JPL · 75823
75829 Alyea	2000 BH_{23}	Gerald "Gerry" Alyea (1932–2010), a founder of the Warren Astronomical Society in Michigan.	JPL · 75829
75836 Warrenastro	2000 BY_{28}	The Warren Astronomical Society in suburban Detroit Michigan, is a long-lived, very active and well educated club. Over the years a number of their members have gone on to careers in professional astronomy. They maintain an observatory at Camp Rotary in Rochester, Michigan, the site of many public star parties.	JPL · 75836
75837 Johnbriol	2000 BC_{29}	John Briol (born 1955) is a dedicated amateur astronomer who has contributed thousands of asteroid observations to the OSIRIS-REx Target Asteroids! citizen science program and Target NEOs! Astronomical League Observing Program.	JPL · 75837
75841 Brendahuettner	2000 BA_{32}	Brenda Huettner (born 1960) is a dedicated OSIRIS-REx Ambassador assisting the University of Arizona's Lunar and Planetary Laboratory with public events.	JPL · 75841
75842 Jackmonahan	2000 BE_{32}	Jack Monahan (born 1945) is a Navy veteran, science and math teacher and a dedicated OSIRIS-REx Ambassador who assists the University of Arizona's, Lunar and Planetary Laboratory with public events.	JPL · 75842
75844 Rexadams	2000 BN_{33}	Rex Adams (born 1945) was a researcher, educator and curator at the University of Arizona's Laboratory of Tree Ring Research for 35 years. He taught numerous students and researchers methods developed by astronomer A. E. Douglass. In 2016 he received the Richard L. Holmes Award for Outstanding Service to Dendrochronology.	JPL · 75844
75846 Jandorf	2000 BN_{34}	Harold "Hal" Jandorf (born 1948) is a well-liked professor of astronomy at Los Angeles Valley College in Valley Glen, California. He is also adjunct faculty at Moorpark College in California, has authored several editions of Experiences in Astronomy and is a popular outreach speaker with the Ventura County Astronomical Society.	JPL · 75846
75852 Elgie	2000 CY	Joseph Henry Elgie (1864–1937) was an astronomy popularizer, who was elected a Fellow of the Royal Astronomical Society in 1905 and member of the British Astronomical Association in 1910. He wrote seven books on astronomy and the weather, and made radio broadcasts on the BBC in the 1920s.	JPL · 75852

== 75901–76000 ==
back to top

Named minor planet	Provisional	This minor planet was named for...	Ref; Catalog
75969 Backhouse	2000 CE_{112}	Thomas William Backhouse (1842–1920) had an observatory on the roof of his house in Sunderland, England. He observed meteors, variable stars, novae, aurorae, Zodiacal Light, Green Flash, Gegenschein, comets and eclipses (including four total solar). In 1858 he began his "astronomical journal" diary, which ran for 36 volumes.	IAU · 75969
75970 Olcott	2000 CH_{112}	William Tyler Olcott (1873–1936) was an American lawyer, amateur astronomer and co-founder of the American Association of Variable Star Observers. He wrote a number of popular books on astronomy including Star Lore-Myths, Legends and Facts and A Field Book of the Skies.	JPL · 75970
75971 Unkingalls	2000 CK_{112}	Albert Graham Ingalls (Albert "Unk" Ingalls, 1888–1958) helped father amateur telescope making in the United States in the 1920s ushering in an era of amateur astronomy. He published many articles in Scientific American and was the editor of Amateur Telescope Making which was responsible for the construction of thousands of telescopes.	IAU · 75971
75972 Huddleston	2000 CM_{112}	Marvin Huddleston (born 1955) is an amateur astronomer living in Mesquite, Texas. He is a member of the Association of Lunar and Planetary Observers, the Royal Astronomical Society of London and a storm spotter with the meteorological group "Texas Coccorahs".	IAU · 75972
75996 Piekiel	2000 DS_{14}	Robert “Bob” Piekiel (born 1961) is an astronomical educator. He is the author of several books on the history, manufacture and maintenance of Schmidt-Cassegrain telescopes.	IAU · 75996
76000 Juliuserving	2000 DO_{15}	Julius Winfield Erving II (born 1950) known as Dr. J is revered as one of the greatest and most influential basketball players of all time. He led several teams to championship seasons including two with the ABA New York Nets and one with the NBA Philadelphia 76ers.	IAU · 76000

back to top

Preceded by 74,001–75,000	Meanings of minor-planet names List of minor planets: 75,001–76,000	Succeeded by 76,001–77,000
