= List of minor planets: 75001–76000 =

The following is a partial list of minor planets, running from minor-planet number 75001 through 76000, inclusive. The primary data for this and other partial lists is based on JPL's "Small-Body Orbital Elements" and data available from the Minor Planet Center. Critical list information is also provided by the MPC, unless otherwise specified from Lowell Observatory. A detailed description of the table's columns and additional sources are given on the main page including a complete list of every page in this series, and a statistical break-up on the dynamical classification of minor planets.

Also see the summary list of all named bodies in numerical and alphabetical order, and the corresponding naming citations for the number range of this particular list. New namings may only be added to this list after official publication, as the preannouncement of names is condemned by the Working Group for Small Bodies Nomenclature of the International Astronomical Union.

Near-Earth obj.	MBA (inner)	MBA (outer)	Centaur
Mars-crosser	MBA (middle)	Jupiter trojan	Trans-Neptunian obj.
Unclassified

== 75001–75100 ==
Designation			Discovery			Properties		Ref
Permanent	Provisional	Named after	Date	Site	Discoverer(s)	Category	Diam.	Ref
75001	1999 TX_{283}	—	October 9, 1999	Socorro	LINEAR	·	3.5 km	MPC · JPL
75002	1999 TM_{285}	—	October 9, 1999	Socorro	LINEAR	·	1.8 km	MPC · JPL
75003	1999 TO_{286}	—	October 10, 1999	Socorro	LINEAR	·	3.1 km	MPC · JPL
75004	1999 TQ_{291}	—	October 10, 1999	Socorro	LINEAR	·	1.8 km	MPC · JPL
75005	1999 TZ_{297}	—	October 1, 1999	Catalina	CSS	V	1.4 km	MPC · JPL
75006	1999 TX_{308}	—	October 6, 1999	Kitt Peak	Spacewatch	·	2.6 km	MPC · JPL
75007	1999 TU_{320}	—	October 10, 1999	Socorro	LINEAR	·	3.0 km	MPC · JPL
75008	1999 TE_{328}	—	October 12, 1999	Socorro	LINEAR	V	1.3 km	MPC · JPL
75009 Petervereš	1999 UC	Petervereš	October 16, 1999	Ondřejov	P. Pravec, P. Kušnirák	·	1.8 km	MPC · JPL
75010	1999 UP	—	October 16, 1999	Višnjan Observatory	K. Korlević	V	1.8 km	MPC · JPL
75011	1999 UQ_{1}	—	October 17, 1999	Oohira	T. Urata	V	2.3 km	MPC · JPL
75012	1999 UO_{3}	—	October 17, 1999	Višnjan Observatory	K. Korlević	V	2.1 km	MPC · JPL
75013	1999 UJ_{4}	—	October 29, 1999	Farpoint	G. Hug, G. Bell	·	3.5 km	MPC · JPL
75014	1999 UO_{4}	—	October 31, 1999	Fountain Hills	C. W. Juels	·	1.9 km	MPC · JPL
75015	1999 UW_{4}	—	October 29, 1999	Kitt Peak	Spacewatch	·	1.6 km	MPC · JPL
75016	1999 UC_{5}	—	October 29, 1999	Catalina	CSS	·	3.1 km	MPC · JPL
75017	1999 UE_{5}	—	October 29, 1999	Socorro	LINEAR	PHO	2.2 km	MPC · JPL
75018	1999 UL_{5}	—	October 29, 1999	Socorro	LINEAR	BAR	6.0 km	MPC · JPL
75019	1999 UZ_{7}	—	October 29, 1999	Catalina	CSS	·	3.0 km	MPC · JPL
75020	1999 UM_{8}	—	October 29, 1999	Catalina	CSS	·	2.7 km	MPC · JPL
75021	1999 UO_{8}	—	October 29, 1999	Catalina	CSS	NYS	2.5 km	MPC · JPL
75022	1999 UP_{8}	—	October 29, 1999	Catalina	CSS	NYS	2.1 km	MPC · JPL
75023	1999 UH_{9}	—	October 29, 1999	Catalina	CSS	NYS	3.3 km	MPC · JPL
75024	1999 UA_{14}	—	October 29, 1999	Catalina	CSS	NYS	2.8 km	MPC · JPL
75025	1999 UJ_{14}	—	October 29, 1999	Catalina	CSS	NYS	1.7 km	MPC · JPL
75026	1999 UT_{14}	—	October 29, 1999	Catalina	CSS	·	2.4 km	MPC · JPL
75027	1999 UG_{17}	—	October 29, 1999	Kitt Peak	Spacewatch	·	1.5 km	MPC · JPL
75028	1999 US_{17}	—	October 30, 1999	Kitt Peak	Spacewatch	·	3.4 km	MPC · JPL
75029	1999 UR_{20}	—	October 31, 1999	Kitt Peak	Spacewatch	·	1.4 km	MPC · JPL
75030	1999 UQ_{23}	—	October 28, 1999	Catalina	CSS	·	3.0 km	MPC · JPL
75031	1999 UX_{23}	—	October 28, 1999	Catalina	CSS	·	2.0 km	MPC · JPL
75032	1999 UT_{24}	—	October 28, 1999	Catalina	CSS	V	1.5 km	MPC · JPL
75033	1999 UU_{24}	—	October 28, 1999	Catalina	CSS	·	3.9 km	MPC · JPL
75034	1999 UV_{25}	—	October 30, 1999	Catalina	CSS	·	2.7 km	MPC · JPL
75035	1999 UY_{25}	—	October 30, 1999	Catalina	CSS	V	2.3 km	MPC · JPL
75036	1999 UD_{26}	—	October 30, 1999	Catalina	CSS	PHO	3.3 km	MPC · JPL
75037	1999 UG_{28}	—	October 30, 1999	Kitt Peak	Spacewatch	·	2.0 km	MPC · JPL
75038	1999 UB_{31}	—	October 31, 1999	Kitt Peak	Spacewatch	MAS	1.6 km	MPC · JPL
75039	1999 UC_{32}	—	October 31, 1999	Kitt Peak	Spacewatch	·	2.2 km	MPC · JPL
75040	1999 UP_{33}	—	October 31, 1999	Kitt Peak	Spacewatch	·	2.0 km	MPC · JPL
75041	1999 UB_{38}	—	October 17, 1999	Kitt Peak	Spacewatch	·	1.4 km	MPC · JPL
75042	1999 UQ_{38}	—	October 29, 1999	Anderson Mesa	LONEOS	·	2.1 km	MPC · JPL
75043	1999 UE_{39}	—	October 29, 1999	Anderson Mesa	LONEOS	V	2.2 km	MPC · JPL
75044	1999 UG_{42}	—	October 20, 1999	Anderson Mesa	LONEOS	·	4.4 km	MPC · JPL
75045	1999 UK_{43}	—	October 28, 1999	Catalina	CSS	V	2.2 km	MPC · JPL
75046	1999 UM_{43}	—	October 28, 1999	Catalina	CSS	·	1.6 km	MPC · JPL
75047	1999 UD_{44}	—	October 29, 1999	Catalina	CSS	(883)	2.1 km	MPC · JPL
75048	1999 UM_{46}	—	October 31, 1999	Catalina	CSS	V	1.8 km	MPC · JPL
75049	1999 UX_{46}	—	October 29, 1999	Anderson Mesa	LONEOS	·	4.4 km	MPC · JPL
75050	1999 UN_{47}	—	October 30, 1999	Catalina	CSS	(5)	2.1 km	MPC · JPL
75051	1999 UN_{48}	—	October 30, 1999	Catalina	CSS	·	2.6 km	MPC · JPL
75052	1999 UM_{50}	—	October 30, 1999	Catalina	CSS	·	3.7 km	MPC · JPL
75053	1999 UH_{54}	—	October 22, 1999	Socorro	LINEAR	·	2.2 km	MPC · JPL
75054	1999 UQ_{57}	—	October 31, 1999	Anderson Mesa	LONEOS	(2076)	1.9 km	MPC · JPL
75055	1999 VX_{2}	—	November 4, 1999	Nachi-Katsuura	Y. Shimizu, T. Urata	V	2.6 km	MPC · JPL
75056	1999 VJ_{4}	—	November 1, 1999	Catalina	CSS	·	2.2 km	MPC · JPL
75057	1999 VR_{4}	—	November 7, 1999	Lime Creek	R. Linderholm	ADE	4.9 km	MPC · JPL
75058 Hanau	1999 VK_{5}	Hanau	November 6, 1999	Saji	Saji	·	2.1 km	MPC · JPL
75059	1999 VU_{5}	—	November 5, 1999	Oizumi	T. Kobayashi	·	5.4 km	MPC · JPL
75060	1999 VJ_{6}	—	November 5, 1999	Oizumi	T. Kobayashi	(1338) (FLO)	2.5 km	MPC · JPL
75061	1999 VK_{7}	—	November 7, 1999	Višnjan Observatory	K. Korlević	·	2.5 km	MPC · JPL
75062	1999 VZ_{7}	—	November 8, 1999	Višnjan Observatory	K. Korlević	·	2.6 km	MPC · JPL
75063 Koestler	1999 VO_{8}	Koestler	November 1, 1999	Gnosca	S. Sposetti	·	4.0 km	MPC · JPL
75064	1999 VF_{10}	—	November 9, 1999	Oizumi	T. Kobayashi	·	3.9 km	MPC · JPL
75065	1999 VO_{10}	—	November 9, 1999	Oizumi	T. Kobayashi	V	1.9 km	MPC · JPL
75066	1999 VK_{11}	—	November 10, 1999	Višnjan Observatory	K. Korlević	NYS	2.8 km	MPC · JPL
75067	1999 VN_{12}	—	November 11, 1999	Fountain Hills	C. W. Juels	·	2.2 km	MPC · JPL
75068	1999 VR_{13}	—	November 2, 1999	Socorro	LINEAR	·	5.2 km	MPC · JPL
75069	1999 VW_{17}	—	November 2, 1999	Kitt Peak	Spacewatch	(2076)	1.3 km	MPC · JPL
75070	1999 VX_{17}	—	November 2, 1999	Kitt Peak	Spacewatch	(2076)	1.6 km	MPC · JPL
75071	1999 VB_{19}	—	November 11, 1999	Farpoint	G. Bell, G. Hug	·	2.0 km	MPC · JPL
75072 Timerskine	1999 VU_{19}	Timerskine	November 14, 1999	Wiggins Observatory	P. Wiggins, Phaneuf, H.	·	2.9 km	MPC · JPL
75073	1999 VK_{21}	—	November 11, 1999	Xinglong	SCAP	·	3.8 km	MPC · JPL
75074	1999 VU_{21}	—	November 12, 1999	Višnjan Observatory	K. Korlević	V	2.7 km	MPC · JPL
75075	1999 VB_{22}	—	November 13, 1999	Višnjan Observatory	K. Korlević	·	4.7 km	MPC · JPL
75076	1999 VE_{22}	—	November 12, 1999	Farpoint	G. Hug, G. Bell	·	1.9 km	MPC · JPL
75077	1999 VP_{22}	—	November 13, 1999	Fountain Hills	C. W. Juels	·	2.4 km	MPC · JPL
75078	1999 VG_{23}	—	November 8, 1999	Mallorca	R. Pacheco, Á. López J.	·	2.4 km	MPC · JPL
75079	1999 VN_{24}	—	November 15, 1999	Fountain Hills	C. W. Juels	PHO	4.0 km	MPC · JPL
75080	1999 VP_{24}	—	November 12, 1999	Kvistaberg	Uppsala-DLR Asteroid Survey	·	2.4 km	MPC · JPL
75081	1999 VC_{25}	—	November 13, 1999	Oizumi	T. Kobayashi	·	3.7 km	MPC · JPL
75082	1999 VF_{26}	—	November 3, 1999	Socorro	LINEAR	NYS	2.6 km	MPC · JPL
75083	1999 VV_{26}	—	November 3, 1999	Socorro	LINEAR	NYS	1.9 km	MPC · JPL
75084	1999 VX_{26}	—	November 3, 1999	Socorro	LINEAR	·	1.7 km	MPC · JPL
75085	1999 VC_{28}	—	November 3, 1999	Socorro	LINEAR	·	4.2 km	MPC · JPL
75086	1999 VU_{28}	—	November 3, 1999	Socorro	LINEAR	MAS	1.5 km	MPC · JPL
75087	1999 VY_{28}	—	November 3, 1999	Socorro	LINEAR	V	1.5 km	MPC · JPL
75088	1999 VV_{29}	—	November 3, 1999	Socorro	LINEAR	MAS	2.5 km	MPC · JPL
75089	1999 VY_{30}	—	November 3, 1999	Socorro	LINEAR	·	4.6 km	MPC · JPL
75090	1999 VP_{31}	—	November 3, 1999	Socorro	LINEAR	·	3.5 km	MPC · JPL
75091	1999 VL_{33}	—	November 3, 1999	Socorro	LINEAR	(7744)	3.2 km	MPC · JPL
75092	1999 VG_{34}	—	November 3, 1999	Socorro	LINEAR	·	2.0 km	MPC · JPL
75093	1999 VA_{35}	—	November 3, 1999	Socorro	LINEAR	·	3.0 km	MPC · JPL
75094	1999 VD_{35}	—	November 3, 1999	Socorro	LINEAR	·	2.8 km	MPC · JPL
75095	1999 VT_{36}	—	November 3, 1999	Socorro	LINEAR	V	1.9 km	MPC · JPL
75096	1999 VW_{36}	—	November 3, 1999	Socorro	LINEAR	·	3.9 km	MPC · JPL
75097	1999 VO_{37}	—	November 3, 1999	Socorro	LINEAR	·	3.5 km	MPC · JPL
75098	1999 VK_{38}	—	November 10, 1999	Socorro	LINEAR	·	1.4 km	MPC · JPL
75099	1999 VA_{41}	—	November 1, 1999	Kitt Peak	Spacewatch	·	1.6 km	MPC · JPL
75100	1999 VF_{43}	—	November 4, 1999	Kitt Peak	Spacewatch	·	1.8 km	MPC · JPL

== 75101–75200 ==
back to top

Designation			Discovery			Properties		Ref
Permanent	Provisional	Named after	Date	Site	Discoverer(s)	Category	Diam.	Ref
75101	1999 VE_{45}	—	November 4, 1999	Catalina	CSS	·	2.5 km	MPC · JPL
75102	1999 VX_{46}	—	November 4, 1999	Socorro	LINEAR	fast	2.1 km	MPC · JPL
75103	1999 VL_{49}	—	November 3, 1999	Socorro	LINEAR	·	3.5 km	MPC · JPL
75104	1999 VQ_{49}	—	November 3, 1999	Socorro	LINEAR	·	3.9 km	MPC · JPL
75105	1999 VP_{51}	—	November 3, 1999	Socorro	LINEAR	·	1.8 km	MPC · JPL
75106	1999 VL_{52}	—	November 3, 1999	Socorro	LINEAR	·	3.4 km	MPC · JPL
75107	1999 VW_{54}	—	November 4, 1999	Socorro	LINEAR	·	3.4 km	MPC · JPL
75108	1999 VJ_{55}	—	November 4, 1999	Socorro	LINEAR	NYS	3.0 km	MPC · JPL
75109	1999 VQ_{55}	—	November 4, 1999	Socorro	LINEAR	·	2.2 km	MPC · JPL
75110	1999 VH_{56}	—	November 4, 1999	Socorro	LINEAR	·	2.2 km	MPC · JPL
75111	1999 VJ_{56}	—	November 4, 1999	Socorro	LINEAR	·	1.7 km	MPC · JPL
75112	1999 VN_{56}	—	November 4, 1999	Socorro	LINEAR	·	3.9 km	MPC · JPL
75113	1999 VZ_{57}	—	November 4, 1999	Socorro	LINEAR	(2076)	2.4 km	MPC · JPL
75114	1999 VJ_{58}	—	November 4, 1999	Socorro	LINEAR	·	4.9 km	MPC · JPL
75115	1999 VR_{58}	—	November 4, 1999	Socorro	LINEAR	·	2.1 km	MPC · JPL
75116	1999 VM_{60}	—	November 4, 1999	Socorro	LINEAR	·	1.5 km	MPC · JPL
75117	1999 VN_{60}	—	November 4, 1999	Socorro	LINEAR	·	1.9 km	MPC · JPL
75118	1999 VP_{60}	—	November 4, 1999	Socorro	LINEAR	·	2.0 km	MPC · JPL
75119	1999 VU_{60}	—	November 4, 1999	Socorro	LINEAR	V	1.5 km	MPC · JPL
75120	1999 VW_{60}	—	November 4, 1999	Socorro	LINEAR	·	2.4 km	MPC · JPL
75121	1999 VP_{62}	—	November 4, 1999	Socorro	LINEAR	·	3.5 km	MPC · JPL
75122	1999 VU_{63}	—	November 4, 1999	Socorro	LINEAR	·	1.4 km	MPC · JPL
75123	1999 VH_{64}	—	November 4, 1999	Socorro	LINEAR	NYS	3.0 km	MPC · JPL
75124	1999 VR_{64}	—	November 4, 1999	Socorro	LINEAR	·	3.1 km	MPC · JPL
75125	1999 VY_{64}	—	November 4, 1999	Socorro	LINEAR	·	2.4 km	MPC · JPL
75126	1999 VU_{65}	—	November 4, 1999	Socorro	LINEAR	(194)	3.2 km	MPC · JPL
75127	1999 VP_{66}	—	November 4, 1999	Socorro	LINEAR	V	1.6 km	MPC · JPL
75128	1999 VW_{66}	—	November 4, 1999	Socorro	LINEAR	·	3.9 km	MPC · JPL
75129	1999 VP_{69}	—	November 4, 1999	Socorro	LINEAR	·	4.1 km	MPC · JPL
75130	1999 VE_{71}	—	November 4, 1999	Socorro	LINEAR	EUN	2.8 km	MPC · JPL
75131	1999 VH_{71}	—	November 4, 1999	Socorro	LINEAR	NYS	4.4 km	MPC · JPL
75132	1999 VK_{71}	—	November 4, 1999	Socorro	LINEAR	·	2.1 km	MPC · JPL
75133	1999 VT_{74}	—	November 5, 1999	Kitt Peak	Spacewatch	·	1.4 km	MPC · JPL
75134	1999 VR_{77}	—	November 3, 1999	Socorro	LINEAR	·	2.0 km	MPC · JPL
75135	1999 VT_{77}	—	November 3, 1999	Socorro	LINEAR	·	2.9 km	MPC · JPL
75136	1999 VF_{79}	—	November 4, 1999	Socorro	LINEAR	·	2.2 km	MPC · JPL
75137	1999 VW_{79}	—	November 4, 1999	Socorro	LINEAR	·	1.7 km	MPC · JPL
75138	1999 VT_{80}	—	November 4, 1999	Socorro	LINEAR	·	3.1 km	MPC · JPL
75139	1999 VD_{83}	—	November 1, 1999	Kitt Peak	Spacewatch	·	3.5 km	MPC · JPL
75140	1999 VM_{83}	—	November 2, 1999	Kitt Peak	Spacewatch	·	1.5 km	MPC · JPL
75141	1999 VZ_{84}	—	November 6, 1999	Kitt Peak	Spacewatch	·	1.2 km	MPC · JPL
75142	1999 VR_{87}	—	November 5, 1999	Socorro	LINEAR	·	1.5 km	MPC · JPL
75143	1999 VF_{90}	—	November 5, 1999	Socorro	LINEAR	·	2.5 km	MPC · JPL
75144	1999 VO_{91}	—	November 5, 1999	Socorro	LINEAR	·	3.1 km	MPC · JPL
75145	1999 VJ_{93}	—	November 9, 1999	Socorro	LINEAR	·	2.8 km	MPC · JPL
75146	1999 VE_{94}	—	November 9, 1999	Socorro	LINEAR	·	1.9 km	MPC · JPL
75147	1999 VD_{95}	—	November 9, 1999	Socorro	LINEAR	·	1.4 km	MPC · JPL
75148	1999 VN_{95}	—	November 9, 1999	Socorro	LINEAR	NYS ·	3.8 km	MPC · JPL
75149	1999 VM_{96}	—	November 9, 1999	Socorro	LINEAR	·	1.4 km	MPC · JPL
75150	1999 VU_{98}	—	November 9, 1999	Socorro	LINEAR	·	2.0 km	MPC · JPL
75151	1999 VY_{100}	—	November 9, 1999	Socorro	LINEAR	MAS	2.2 km	MPC · JPL
75152	1999 VP_{105}	—	November 9, 1999	Socorro	LINEAR	fast	1.4 km	MPC · JPL
75153	1999 VT_{106}	—	November 9, 1999	Socorro	LINEAR	·	1.7 km	MPC · JPL
75154	1999 VU_{108}	—	November 9, 1999	Socorro	LINEAR	·	2.3 km	MPC · JPL
75155	1999 VX_{108}	—	November 9, 1999	Socorro	LINEAR	MAS	1.4 km	MPC · JPL
75156	1999 VN_{109}	—	November 9, 1999	Socorro	LINEAR	·	1.7 km	MPC · JPL
75157	1999 VP_{109}	—	November 9, 1999	Socorro	LINEAR	MAS	1.2 km	MPC · JPL
75158	1999 VU_{111}	—	November 9, 1999	Socorro	LINEAR	·	3.7 km	MPC · JPL
75159	1999 VZ_{112}	—	November 9, 1999	Socorro	LINEAR	EUN	2.6 km	MPC · JPL
75160	1999 VX_{113}	—	November 9, 1999	Catalina	CSS	V	1.4 km	MPC · JPL
75161	1999 VH_{115}	—	November 9, 1999	Catalina	CSS	EUN	2.2 km	MPC · JPL
75162	1999 VK_{116}	—	November 4, 1999	Kitt Peak	Spacewatch	·	2.4 km	MPC · JPL
75163	1999 VG_{119}	—	November 3, 1999	Kitt Peak	Spacewatch	·	1.7 km	MPC · JPL
75164	1999 VN_{119}	—	November 3, 1999	Kitt Peak	Spacewatch	NYS ·	4.1 km	MPC · JPL
75165	1999 VQ_{121}	—	November 4, 1999	Kitt Peak	Spacewatch	·	2.4 km	MPC · JPL
75166	1999 VH_{124}	—	November 6, 1999	Kitt Peak	Spacewatch	V	1.4 km	MPC · JPL
75167	1999 VF_{128}	—	November 9, 1999	Kitt Peak	Spacewatch	·	1.7 km	MPC · JPL
75168	1999 VF_{129}	—	November 11, 1999	Kitt Peak	Spacewatch	·	4.0 km	MPC · JPL
75169	1999 VR_{135}	—	November 8, 1999	Socorro	LINEAR	·	2.5 km	MPC · JPL
75170	1999 VC_{138}	—	November 9, 1999	Catalina	CSS	V	1.6 km	MPC · JPL
75171	1999 VB_{143}	—	November 13, 1999	Kitt Peak	Spacewatch	·	2.0 km	MPC · JPL
75172	1999 VT_{144}	—	November 13, 1999	Catalina	CSS	PHO	5.7 km	MPC · JPL
75173	1999 VA_{148}	—	November 14, 1999	Socorro	LINEAR	V	1.6 km	MPC · JPL
75174	1999 VX_{148}	—	November 14, 1999	Socorro	LINEAR	·	2.3 km	MPC · JPL
75175	1999 VF_{152}	—	November 9, 1999	Kitt Peak	Spacewatch	·	2.5 km	MPC · JPL
75176	1999 VV_{155}	—	November 9, 1999	Socorro	LINEAR	KOR	2.3 km	MPC · JPL
75177	1999 VY_{156}	—	November 12, 1999	Socorro	LINEAR	·	3.0 km	MPC · JPL
75178	1999 VQ_{157}	—	November 14, 1999	Socorro	LINEAR	·	3.3 km	MPC · JPL
75179	1999 VA_{158}	—	November 14, 1999	Socorro	LINEAR	·	4.5 km	MPC · JPL
75180	1999 VF_{158}	—	November 14, 1999	Socorro	LINEAR	·	1.8 km	MPC · JPL
75181	1999 VW_{158}	—	November 14, 1999	Socorro	LINEAR	(2076)	2.1 km	MPC · JPL
75182	1999 VC_{159}	—	November 14, 1999	Socorro	LINEAR	NYS	2.4 km	MPC · JPL
75183	1999 VB_{160}	—	November 14, 1999	Socorro	LINEAR	MAS	1.6 km	MPC · JPL
75184	1999 VF_{160}	—	November 14, 1999	Socorro	LINEAR	NYS	2.4 km	MPC · JPL
75185	1999 VQ_{160}	—	November 14, 1999	Socorro	LINEAR	·	2.8 km	MPC · JPL
75186	1999 VX_{160}	—	November 14, 1999	Socorro	LINEAR	NYS	1.6 km	MPC · JPL
75187	1999 VU_{161}	—	November 14, 1999	Socorro	LINEAR	·	1.6 km	MPC · JPL
75188	1999 VB_{162}	—	November 14, 1999	Socorro	LINEAR	·	1.8 km	MPC · JPL
75189	1999 VQ_{168}	—	November 14, 1999	Socorro	LINEAR	·	2.2 km	MPC · JPL
75190 Segreliliana	1999 VD_{169}	Segreliliana	November 14, 1999	Socorro	LINEAR	MAS	1.5 km	MPC · JPL
75191	1999 VE_{170}	—	November 14, 1999	Socorro	LINEAR	NYS	2.4 km	MPC · JPL
75192	1999 VG_{171}	—	November 14, 1999	Socorro	LINEAR	NYS	2.5 km	MPC · JPL
75193	1999 VN_{171}	—	November 14, 1999	Socorro	LINEAR	·	2.2 km	MPC · JPL
75194	1999 VQ_{171}	—	November 14, 1999	Socorro	LINEAR	·	2.1 km	MPC · JPL
75195	1999 VJ_{173}	—	November 15, 1999	Socorro	LINEAR	·	2.7 km	MPC · JPL
75196	1999 VK_{173}	—	November 15, 1999	Socorro	LINEAR	·	4.1 km	MPC · JPL
75197	1999 VQ_{173}	—	November 15, 1999	Socorro	LINEAR	·	2.1 km	MPC · JPL
75198	1999 VR_{173}	—	November 15, 1999	Socorro	LINEAR	MAS	1.1 km	MPC · JPL
75199	1999 VK_{176}	—	November 4, 1999	Socorro	LINEAR	·	2.3 km	MPC · JPL
75200	1999 VG_{177}	—	November 5, 1999	Socorro	LINEAR	·	2.4 km	MPC · JPL

== 75201–75300 ==
back to top

Designation			Discovery			Properties		Ref
Permanent	Provisional	Named after	Date	Site	Discoverer(s)	Category	Diam.	Ref
75201	1999 VC_{178}	—	November 6, 1999	Socorro	LINEAR	·	2.5 km	MPC · JPL
75202	1999 VV_{178}	—	November 6, 1999	Socorro	LINEAR	·	2.7 km	MPC · JPL
75203	1999 VL_{183}	—	November 12, 1999	Socorro	LINEAR	·	2.1 km	MPC · JPL
75204	1999 VC_{184}	—	November 15, 1999	Socorro	LINEAR	KOR	2.8 km	MPC · JPL
75205	1999 VQ_{184}	—	November 15, 1999	Socorro	LINEAR	(2076)	2.0 km	MPC · JPL
75206	1999 VY_{184}	—	November 15, 1999	Socorro	LINEAR	·	3.0 km	MPC · JPL
75207	1999 VR_{188}	—	November 15, 1999	Socorro	LINEAR	·	3.6 km	MPC · JPL
75208	1999 VE_{191}	—	November 9, 1999	Socorro	LINEAR	·	1.3 km	MPC · JPL
75209	1999 VM_{192}	—	November 1, 1999	Anderson Mesa	LONEOS	·	2.3 km	MPC · JPL
75210	1999 VP_{192}	—	November 1, 1999	Anderson Mesa	LONEOS	V	1.3 km	MPC · JPL
75211	1999 VD_{193}	—	November 1, 1999	Anderson Mesa	LONEOS	·	3.0 km	MPC · JPL
75212	1999 VK_{201}	—	November 3, 1999	Socorro	LINEAR	·	2.4 km	MPC · JPL
75213	1999 VD_{202}	—	November 4, 1999	Socorro	LINEAR	·	1.9 km	MPC · JPL
75214	1999 VF_{202}	—	November 4, 1999	Socorro	LINEAR	·	1.8 km	MPC · JPL
75215	1999 VG_{212}	—	November 12, 1999	Socorro	LINEAR	(2076)	1.3 km	MPC · JPL
75216	1999 VV_{213}	—	November 14, 1999	Socorro	LINEAR	NYS	1.6 km	MPC · JPL
75217	1999 VJ_{215}	—	November 3, 1999	Socorro	LINEAR	·	1.9 km	MPC · JPL
75218	1999 VL_{216}	—	November 3, 1999	Socorro	LINEAR	·	2.2 km	MPC · JPL
75219	1999 VV_{219}	—	November 5, 1999	Socorro	LINEAR	·	2.9 km	MPC · JPL
75220	1999 VL_{220}	—	November 3, 1999	Socorro	LINEAR	·	2.1 km	MPC · JPL
75221	1999 VN_{222}	—	November 4, 1999	Kitt Peak	Spacewatch	·	1.3 km	MPC · JPL
75222	1999 VO_{223}	—	November 5, 1999	Socorro	LINEAR	RAF	1.7 km	MPC · JPL
75223 Wupatki	1999 WP_{1}	Wupatki	November 28, 1999	Kleť	M. Tichý, J. Tichá	NYS	4.5 km	MPC · JPL
75224	1999 WC_{3}	—	November 27, 1999	Višnjan Observatory	K. Korlević	·	3.7 km	MPC · JPL
75225 Corradoaugias	1999 WD_{3}	Corradoaugias	November 27, 1999	Colleverde	V. S. Casulli	·	3.2 km	MPC · JPL
75226	1999 WF_{3}	—	November 19, 1999	Kvistaberg	Uppsala-DLR Asteroid Survey	NYS	2.1 km	MPC · JPL
75227	1999 WT_{3}	—	November 28, 1999	Oizumi	T. Kobayashi	V	2.0 km	MPC · JPL
75228	1999 WB_{4}	—	November 28, 1999	Oizumi	T. Kobayashi	·	1.9 km	MPC · JPL
75229	1999 WV_{4}	—	November 28, 1999	Oizumi	T. Kobayashi	·	2.9 km	MPC · JPL
75230	1999 WX_{4}	—	November 28, 1999	Oizumi	T. Kobayashi	·	3.4 km	MPC · JPL
75231	1999 WZ_{4}	—	November 28, 1999	Oizumi	T. Kobayashi	·	3.6 km	MPC · JPL
75232	1999 WK_{6}	—	November 28, 1999	Višnjan Observatory	K. Korlević	·	2.4 km	MPC · JPL
75233	1999 WE_{7}	—	November 28, 1999	Višnjan Observatory	K. Korlević	·	2.7 km	MPC · JPL
75234	1999 WO_{7}	—	November 28, 1999	Višnjan Observatory	K. Korlević	·	2.4 km	MPC · JPL
75235	1999 WX_{7}	—	November 29, 1999	Višnjan Observatory	K. Korlević	·	2.7 km	MPC · JPL
75236	1999 WB_{8}	—	November 28, 1999	Kvistaberg	Uppsala-DLR Asteroid Survey	·	5.4 km	MPC · JPL
75237	1999 WK_{8}	—	November 29, 1999	Oohira	T. Urata	·	5.7 km	MPC · JPL
75238	1999 WC_{9}	—	November 29, 1999	San Marcello	A. Boattini, L. Tesi	·	2.0 km	MPC · JPL
75239	1999 WZ_{9}	—	November 30, 1999	Oizumi	T. Kobayashi	·	3.5 km	MPC · JPL
75240	1999 WH_{11}	—	November 30, 1999	Kitt Peak	Spacewatch	·	6.4 km	MPC · JPL
75241	1999 WL_{11}	—	November 29, 1999	Nachi-Katsuura	Shiozawa, H., T. Urata	·	6.2 km	MPC · JPL
75242	1999 WP_{11}	—	November 29, 1999	Nachi-Katsuura	Shiozawa, H., T. Urata	·	3.0 km	MPC · JPL
75243	1999 WV_{11}	—	November 28, 1999	Kitt Peak	Spacewatch	·	1.5 km	MPC · JPL
75244	1999 WO_{12}	—	November 29, 1999	Kitt Peak	Spacewatch	·	2.1 km	MPC · JPL
75245	1999 WH_{18}	—	November 29, 1999	Višnjan Observatory	K. Korlević	·	3.8 km	MPC · JPL
75246	1999 WJ_{19}	—	November 30, 1999	Kitt Peak	Spacewatch	·	1.6 km	MPC · JPL
75247	1999 XJ	—	December 1, 1999	Prescott	P. G. Comba	·	1.9 km	MPC · JPL
75248	1999 XX	—	December 2, 1999	Oizumi	T. Kobayashi	NYS	3.5 km	MPC · JPL
75249	1999 XU_{1}	—	December 3, 1999	Baton Rouge	W. R. Cooney Jr.	·	1.9 km	MPC · JPL
75250	1999 XH_{3}	—	December 4, 1999	Catalina	CSS	·	2.7 km	MPC · JPL
75251	1999 XN_{3}	—	December 4, 1999	Catalina	CSS	·	3.2 km	MPC · JPL
75252	1999 XS_{3}	—	December 4, 1999	Catalina	CSS	·	5.0 km	MPC · JPL
75253	1999 XY_{3}	—	December 4, 1999	Catalina	CSS	·	4.6 km	MPC · JPL
75254	1999 XC_{4}	—	December 4, 1999	Catalina	CSS	·	1.9 km	MPC · JPL
75255	1999 XD_{6}	—	December 4, 1999	Catalina	CSS	·	3.7 km	MPC · JPL
75256	1999 XW_{6}	—	December 4, 1999	Catalina	CSS	·	3.2 km	MPC · JPL
75257	1999 XX_{6}	—	December 4, 1999	Catalina	CSS	NYS	2.5 km	MPC · JPL
75258	1999 XE_{8}	—	December 3, 1999	Oizumi	T. Kobayashi	NYS	1.9 km	MPC · JPL
75259	1999 XG_{9}	—	December 2, 1999	Kitt Peak	Spacewatch	·	2.8 km	MPC · JPL
75260	1999 XO_{10}	—	December 5, 1999	Catalina	CSS	·	2.5 km	MPC · JPL
75261	1999 XB_{11}	—	December 5, 1999	Catalina	CSS	·	2.6 km	MPC · JPL
75262	1999 XF_{11}	—	December 5, 1999	Catalina	CSS	·	2.2 km	MPC · JPL
75263	1999 XO_{11}	—	December 5, 1999	Catalina	CSS	·	2.7 km	MPC · JPL
75264	1999 XG_{12}	—	December 5, 1999	Socorro	LINEAR	·	1.9 km	MPC · JPL
75265	1999 XE_{13}	—	December 5, 1999	Socorro	LINEAR	·	2.6 km	MPC · JPL
75266	1999 XG_{13}	—	December 5, 1999	Socorro	LINEAR	·	3.0 km	MPC · JPL
75267	1999 XJ_{13}	—	December 5, 1999	Socorro	LINEAR	·	2.4 km	MPC · JPL
75268	1999 XN_{15}	—	December 5, 1999	Višnjan Observatory	K. Korlević	·	4.1 km	MPC · JPL
75269	1999 XU_{15}	—	December 6, 1999	Višnjan Observatory	K. Korlević	·	5.6 km	MPC · JPL
75270	1999 XB_{16}	—	December 7, 1999	Catalina	CSS	·	5.6 km	MPC · JPL
75271	1999 XE_{16}	—	December 7, 1999	Prescott	P. G. Comba	·	3.4 km	MPC · JPL
75272	1999 XG_{16}	—	December 7, 1999	Socorro	LINEAR	·	4.3 km	MPC · JPL
75273	1999 XC_{18}	—	December 3, 1999	Socorro	LINEAR	·	3.4 km	MPC · JPL
75274	1999 XK_{18}	—	December 3, 1999	Socorro	LINEAR	·	1.9 km	MPC · JPL
75275	1999 XG_{19}	—	December 3, 1999	Socorro	LINEAR	(2076)	2.9 km	MPC · JPL
75276	1999 XK_{19}	—	December 3, 1999	Socorro	LINEAR	·	2.5 km	MPC · JPL
75277	1999 XN_{19}	—	December 5, 1999	Socorro	LINEAR	V	2.0 km	MPC · JPL
75278	1999 XQ_{19}	—	December 5, 1999	Socorro	LINEAR	·	2.1 km	MPC · JPL
75279	1999 XX_{19}	—	December 5, 1999	Socorro	LINEAR	·	2.6 km	MPC · JPL
75280	1999 XZ_{20}	—	December 5, 1999	Socorro	LINEAR	fast	1.8 km	MPC · JPL
75281	1999 XF_{22}	—	December 5, 1999	Socorro	LINEAR	EUN	3.9 km	MPC · JPL
75282	1999 XG_{22}	—	December 6, 1999	Socorro	LINEAR	·	1.7 km	MPC · JPL
75283	1999 XH_{23}	—	December 6, 1999	Socorro	LINEAR	·	1.8 km	MPC · JPL
75284	1999 XV_{24}	—	December 6, 1999	Socorro	LINEAR	·	2.4 km	MPC · JPL
75285	1999 XY_{24}	—	December 6, 1999	Socorro	LINEAR	PHO	3.8 km	MPC · JPL
75286	1999 XZ_{24}	—	December 6, 1999	Socorro	LINEAR	·	4.3 km	MPC · JPL
75287	1999 XD_{25}	—	December 6, 1999	Socorro	LINEAR	·	1.9 km	MPC · JPL
75288	1999 XL_{26}	—	December 6, 1999	Socorro	LINEAR	V	1.6 km	MPC · JPL
75289	1999 XM_{26}	—	December 6, 1999	Socorro	LINEAR	·	2.0 km	MPC · JPL
75290	1999 XY_{27}	—	December 6, 1999	Socorro	LINEAR	·	3.0 km	MPC · JPL
75291	1999 XD_{28}	—	December 6, 1999	Socorro	LINEAR	·	4.9 km	MPC · JPL
75292	1999 XE_{28}	—	December 6, 1999	Socorro	LINEAR	·	2.7 km	MPC · JPL
75293	1999 XQ_{28}	—	December 6, 1999	Socorro	LINEAR	·	3.1 km	MPC · JPL
75294	1999 XU_{28}	—	December 6, 1999	Socorro	LINEAR	PHO	3.3 km	MPC · JPL
75295	1999 XH_{30}	—	December 6, 1999	Socorro	LINEAR	V	1.3 km	MPC · JPL
75296	1999 XS_{30}	—	December 6, 1999	Socorro	LINEAR	·	3.1 km	MPC · JPL
75297	1999 XY_{32}	—	December 6, 1999	Socorro	LINEAR	·	8.0 km	MPC · JPL
75298	1999 XF_{33}	—	December 6, 1999	Socorro	LINEAR	·	5.6 km	MPC · JPL
75299	1999 XM_{33}	—	December 6, 1999	Socorro	LINEAR	(5)	2.7 km	MPC · JPL
75300	1999 XJ_{34}	—	December 6, 1999	Socorro	LINEAR	·	5.3 km	MPC · JPL

== 75301–75400 ==
back to top

Designation			Discovery			Properties		Ref
Permanent	Provisional	Named after	Date	Site	Discoverer(s)	Category	Diam.	Ref
75301	1999 XN_{34}	—	December 6, 1999	Socorro	LINEAR	·	12 km	MPC · JPL
75302	1999 XV_{34}	—	December 6, 1999	Socorro	LINEAR	·	3.8 km	MPC · JPL
75303	1999 XQ_{35}	—	December 6, 1999	Catalina	CSS	·	3.8 km	MPC · JPL
75304	1999 XT_{36}	—	December 7, 1999	Fountain Hills	C. W. Juels	·	4.6 km	MPC · JPL
75305	1999 XV_{36}	—	December 7, 1999	Fountain Hills	C. W. Juels	V	2.2 km	MPC · JPL
75306	1999 XZ_{36}	—	December 7, 1999	Oaxaca	Roe, J. M.	NYS ·	3.9 km	MPC · JPL
75307	1999 XM_{37}	—	December 7, 1999	Fountain Hills	C. W. Juels	·	3.1 km	MPC · JPL
75308 Shoin	1999 XY_{37}	Shoin	December 7, 1999	Kuma Kogen	A. Nakamura	·	3.9 km	MPC · JPL
75309	1999 XE_{38}	—	December 3, 1999	Nachi-Katsuura	Y. Shimizu, T. Urata	·	2.2 km	MPC · JPL
75310	1999 XA_{39}	—	December 5, 1999	Socorro	LINEAR	·	5.8 km	MPC · JPL
75311	1999 XC_{39}	—	December 6, 1999	Socorro	LINEAR	·	5.8 km	MPC · JPL
75312	1999 XT_{40}	—	December 7, 1999	Socorro	LINEAR	·	2.0 km	MPC · JPL
75313	1999 XL_{41}	—	December 7, 1999	Socorro	LINEAR	·	2.5 km	MPC · JPL
75314	1999 XG_{42}	—	December 7, 1999	Socorro	LINEAR	·	3.3 km	MPC · JPL
75315	1999 XK_{42}	—	December 7, 1999	Socorro	LINEAR	·	1.8 km	MPC · JPL
75316	1999 XM_{42}	—	December 7, 1999	Socorro	LINEAR	·	1.9 km	MPC · JPL
75317	1999 XO_{43}	—	December 7, 1999	Socorro	LINEAR	NYS	1.7 km	MPC · JPL
75318	1999 XN_{44}	—	December 7, 1999	Socorro	LINEAR	·	2.4 km	MPC · JPL
75319	1999 XU_{44}	—	December 7, 1999	Socorro	LINEAR	(2076)	2.2 km	MPC · JPL
75320	1999 XV_{45}	—	December 7, 1999	Socorro	LINEAR	V	1.4 km	MPC · JPL
75321	1999 XY_{45}	—	December 7, 1999	Socorro	LINEAR	·	2.9 km	MPC · JPL
75322	1999 XF_{47}	—	December 7, 1999	Socorro	LINEAR	·	2.5 km	MPC · JPL
75323	1999 XY_{47}	—	December 7, 1999	Socorro	LINEAR	·	2.9 km	MPC · JPL
75324	1999 XV_{48}	—	December 7, 1999	Socorro	LINEAR	·	3.2 km	MPC · JPL
75325	1999 XX_{48}	—	December 7, 1999	Socorro	LINEAR	V	1.7 km	MPC · JPL
75326	1999 XZ_{50}	—	December 7, 1999	Socorro	LINEAR	NYS	1.8 km	MPC · JPL
75327	1999 XV_{52}	—	December 7, 1999	Socorro	LINEAR	MAS	1.5 km	MPC · JPL
75328	1999 XZ_{52}	—	December 7, 1999	Socorro	LINEAR	·	2.8 km	MPC · JPL
75329	1999 XE_{53}	—	December 7, 1999	Socorro	LINEAR	NYS	2.9 km	MPC · JPL
75330	1999 XF_{53}	—	December 7, 1999	Socorro	LINEAR	·	2.2 km	MPC · JPL
75331	1999 XL_{53}	—	December 7, 1999	Socorro	LINEAR	·	2.6 km	MPC · JPL
75332	1999 XN_{53}	—	December 7, 1999	Socorro	LINEAR	EUN	2.6 km	MPC · JPL
75333	1999 XO_{54}	—	December 7, 1999	Socorro	LINEAR	NYS	2.6 km	MPC · JPL
75334	1999 XS_{54}	—	December 7, 1999	Socorro	LINEAR	·	3.2 km	MPC · JPL
75335	1999 XP_{55}	—	December 7, 1999	Socorro	LINEAR	·	2.9 km	MPC · JPL
75336	1999 XE_{57}	—	December 7, 1999	Socorro	LINEAR	(5)	2.7 km	MPC · JPL
75337	1999 XA_{58}	—	December 7, 1999	Socorro	LINEAR	·	2.2 km	MPC · JPL
75338	1999 XX_{59}	—	December 7, 1999	Socorro	LINEAR	·	3.4 km	MPC · JPL
75339	1999 XN_{60}	—	December 7, 1999	Socorro	LINEAR	·	3.9 km	MPC · JPL
75340	1999 XP_{60}	—	December 7, 1999	Socorro	LINEAR	·	3.7 km	MPC · JPL
75341	1999 XQ_{60}	—	December 7, 1999	Socorro	LINEAR	·	2.8 km	MPC · JPL
75342	1999 XW_{60}	—	December 7, 1999	Socorro	LINEAR	·	2.4 km	MPC · JPL
75343	1999 XK_{61}	—	December 7, 1999	Socorro	LINEAR	·	3.4 km	MPC · JPL
75344	1999 XS_{61}	—	December 7, 1999	Socorro	LINEAR	·	3.1 km	MPC · JPL
75345	1999 XZ_{61}	—	December 7, 1999	Socorro	LINEAR	·	3.6 km	MPC · JPL
75346	1999 XE_{62}	—	December 7, 1999	Socorro	LINEAR	MAS	1.8 km	MPC · JPL
75347	1999 XO_{62}	—	December 7, 1999	Socorro	LINEAR	·	3.1 km	MPC · JPL
75348	1999 XF_{64}	—	December 7, 1999	Socorro	LINEAR	·	4.1 km	MPC · JPL
75349	1999 XB_{65}	—	December 7, 1999	Socorro	LINEAR	·	3.4 km	MPC · JPL
75350	1999 XY_{65}	—	December 7, 1999	Socorro	LINEAR	(5)	2.7 km	MPC · JPL
75351	1999 XY_{67}	—	December 7, 1999	Socorro	LINEAR	·	2.9 km	MPC · JPL
75352	1999 XH_{68}	—	December 7, 1999	Socorro	LINEAR	·	3.9 km	MPC · JPL
75353	1999 XL_{69}	—	December 7, 1999	Socorro	LINEAR	slow	1.8 km	MPC · JPL
75354	1999 XS_{69}	—	December 7, 1999	Socorro	LINEAR	V	1.9 km	MPC · JPL
75355	1999 XP_{70}	—	December 7, 1999	Socorro	LINEAR	MAS	2.1 km	MPC · JPL
75356	1999 XA_{71}	—	December 7, 1999	Socorro	LINEAR	·	3.3 km	MPC · JPL
75357	1999 XL_{71}	—	December 7, 1999	Socorro	LINEAR	·	2.7 km	MPC · JPL
75358	1999 XT_{71}	—	December 7, 1999	Socorro	LINEAR	NYS	2.0 km	MPC · JPL
75359	1999 XA_{72}	—	December 7, 1999	Socorro	LINEAR	·	3.0 km	MPC · JPL
75360	1999 XO_{72}	—	December 7, 1999	Socorro	LINEAR	·	2.4 km	MPC · JPL
75361	1999 XQ_{72}	—	December 7, 1999	Socorro	LINEAR	·	3.2 km	MPC · JPL
75362	1999 XQ_{73}	—	December 7, 1999	Socorro	LINEAR	·	2.9 km	MPC · JPL
75363	1999 XK_{74}	—	December 7, 1999	Socorro	LINEAR	·	2.7 km	MPC · JPL
75364	1999 XZ_{74}	—	December 7, 1999	Socorro	LINEAR	SUL	6.8 km	MPC · JPL
75365	1999 XP_{75}	—	December 7, 1999	Socorro	LINEAR	·	2.6 km	MPC · JPL
75366	1999 XS_{82}	—	December 7, 1999	Socorro	LINEAR	EUN	3.7 km	MPC · JPL
75367	1999 XV_{82}	—	December 7, 1999	Socorro	LINEAR	·	3.7 km	MPC · JPL
75368	1999 XW_{82}	—	December 7, 1999	Socorro	LINEAR	·	3.9 km	MPC · JPL
75369	1999 XZ_{82}	—	December 7, 1999	Socorro	LINEAR	·	2.4 km	MPC · JPL
75370	1999 XM_{83}	—	December 7, 1999	Socorro	LINEAR	slow	7.1 km	MPC · JPL
75371	1999 XU_{83}	—	December 7, 1999	Socorro	LINEAR	·	2.4 km	MPC · JPL
75372	1999 XX_{83}	—	December 7, 1999	Socorro	LINEAR	·	3.2 km	MPC · JPL
75373	1999 XY_{83}	—	December 7, 1999	Socorro	LINEAR	·	2.4 km	MPC · JPL
75374	1999 XG_{84}	—	December 7, 1999	Socorro	LINEAR	·	3.4 km	MPC · JPL
75375	1999 XJ_{84}	—	December 7, 1999	Socorro	LINEAR	·	7.1 km	MPC · JPL
75376	1999 XX_{84}	—	December 7, 1999	Socorro	LINEAR	EUN	3.0 km	MPC · JPL
75377	1999 XP_{85}	—	December 7, 1999	Socorro	LINEAR	·	2.3 km	MPC · JPL
75378	1999 XQ_{85}	—	December 7, 1999	Socorro	LINEAR	·	2.5 km	MPC · JPL
75379	1999 XF_{87}	—	December 7, 1999	Socorro	LINEAR	EUN	4.9 km	MPC · JPL
75380	1999 XK_{87}	—	December 7, 1999	Socorro	LINEAR	MAR	2.5 km	MPC · JPL
75381	1999 XM_{89}	—	December 7, 1999	Socorro	LINEAR	DOR	9.7 km	MPC · JPL
75382	1999 XP_{89}	—	December 7, 1999	Socorro	LINEAR	·	3.9 km	MPC · JPL
75383	1999 XB_{91}	—	December 7, 1999	Socorro	LINEAR	·	5.6 km	MPC · JPL
75384	1999 XS_{91}	—	December 7, 1999	Socorro	LINEAR	EUN	3.8 km	MPC · JPL
75385	1999 XX_{92}	—	December 7, 1999	Socorro	LINEAR	(12739)	4.6 km	MPC · JPL
75386	1999 XZ_{92}	—	December 7, 1999	Socorro	LINEAR	EUN	3.3 km	MPC · JPL
75387	1999 XK_{93}	—	December 7, 1999	Socorro	LINEAR	·	3.1 km	MPC · JPL
75388	1999 XS_{93}	—	December 7, 1999	Socorro	LINEAR	·	4.1 km	MPC · JPL
75389	1999 XU_{94}	—	December 7, 1999	Socorro	LINEAR	·	3.1 km	MPC · JPL
75390	1999 XN_{95}	—	December 7, 1999	Oizumi	T. Kobayashi	MAR	2.3 km	MPC · JPL
75391	1999 XF_{96}	—	December 7, 1999	Socorro	LINEAR	ERI	5.5 km	MPC · JPL
75392	1999 XD_{97}	—	December 7, 1999	Socorro	LINEAR	NYS	3.7 km	MPC · JPL
75393	1999 XS_{97}	—	December 7, 1999	Socorro	LINEAR	NYS	2.7 km	MPC · JPL
75394	1999 XE_{98}	—	December 7, 1999	Socorro	LINEAR	·	2.1 km	MPC · JPL
75395	1999 XJ_{98}	—	December 7, 1999	Socorro	LINEAR	·	2.9 km	MPC · JPL
75396	1999 XU_{98}	—	December 7, 1999	Socorro	LINEAR	V	2.4 km	MPC · JPL
75397	1999 XY_{98}	—	December 7, 1999	Socorro	LINEAR	NYS	4.4 km	MPC · JPL
75398	1999 XZ_{98}	—	December 7, 1999	Socorro	LINEAR	·	3.9 km	MPC · JPL
75399	1999 XB_{99}	—	December 7, 1999	Socorro	LINEAR	·	2.6 km	MPC · JPL
75400	1999 XQ_{100}	—	December 7, 1999	Socorro	LINEAR	EUN	2.9 km	MPC · JPL

== 75401–75500 ==
back to top

Designation			Discovery			Properties		Ref
Permanent	Provisional	Named after	Date	Site	Discoverer(s)	Category	Diam.	Ref
75401	1999 XV_{100}	—	December 7, 1999	Socorro	LINEAR	·	3.5 km	MPC · JPL
75402	1999 XF_{101}	—	December 7, 1999	Socorro	LINEAR	·	3.7 km	MPC · JPL
75403	1999 XH_{102}	—	December 7, 1999	Socorro	LINEAR	V	1.9 km	MPC · JPL
75404	1999 XM_{102}	—	December 7, 1999	Socorro	LINEAR	V	2.0 km	MPC · JPL
75405	1999 XQ_{103}	—	December 7, 1999	Socorro	LINEAR	·	3.2 km	MPC · JPL
75406	1999 XR_{103}	—	December 7, 1999	Socorro	LINEAR	MAS	1.6 km	MPC · JPL
75407	1999 XU_{103}	—	December 7, 1999	Socorro	LINEAR	·	3.7 km	MPC · JPL
75408	1999 XG_{104}	—	December 7, 1999	Socorro	LINEAR	·	2.5 km	MPC · JPL
75409	1999 XR_{104}	—	December 9, 1999	Fountain Hills	C. W. Juels	·	3.8 km	MPC · JPL
75410	1999 XW_{104}	—	December 10, 1999	Oizumi	T. Kobayashi	·	2.1 km	MPC · JPL
75411	1999 XQ_{106}	—	December 4, 1999	Catalina	CSS	(2076)	2.8 km	MPC · JPL
75412	1999 XJ_{108}	—	December 4, 1999	Catalina	CSS	·	2.9 km	MPC · JPL
75413	1999 XW_{110}	—	December 5, 1999	Catalina	CSS	·	3.1 km	MPC · JPL
75414	1999 XC_{112}	—	December 7, 1999	Socorro	LINEAR	MAS	1.4 km	MPC · JPL
75415	1999 XK_{115}	—	December 4, 1999	Catalina	CSS	·	2.2 km	MPC · JPL
75416	1999 XU_{115}	—	December 5, 1999	Catalina	CSS	·	3.7 km	MPC · JPL
75417	1999 XR_{116}	—	December 5, 1999	Catalina	CSS	·	1.9 km	MPC · JPL
75418	1999 XY_{116}	—	December 5, 1999	Catalina	CSS	·	2.7 km	MPC · JPL
75419	1999 XF_{117}	—	December 5, 1999	Catalina	CSS	·	2.6 km	MPC · JPL
75420	1999 XE_{118}	—	December 5, 1999	Catalina	CSS	NYS	2.7 km	MPC · JPL
75421	1999 XQ_{118}	—	December 5, 1999	Catalina	CSS	(5)	2.7 km	MPC · JPL
75422	1999 XH_{119}	—	December 5, 1999	Catalina	CSS	·	2.0 km	MPC · JPL
75423 Gladyswest	1999 XO_{119}	Gladyswest	December 5, 1999	Catalina	CSS	V	2.2 km	MPC · JPL
75424	1999 XL_{120}	—	December 5, 1999	Catalina	CSS	·	3.5 km	MPC · JPL
75425	1999 XG_{121}	—	December 5, 1999	Catalina	CSS	·	2.8 km	MPC · JPL
75426	1999 XJ_{123}	—	December 7, 1999	Catalina	CSS	V	2.7 km	MPC · JPL
75427	1999 XK_{123}	—	December 7, 1999	Catalina	CSS	V	1.5 km	MPC · JPL
75428	1999 XM_{123}	—	December 7, 1999	Catalina	CSS	·	3.4 km	MPC · JPL
75429	1999 XV_{124}	—	December 7, 1999	Catalina	CSS	·	2.7 km	MPC · JPL
75430	1999 XN_{125}	—	December 7, 1999	Catalina	CSS	·	9.2 km	MPC · JPL
75431	1999 XD_{126}	—	December 7, 1999	Catalina	CSS	·	2.7 km	MPC · JPL
75432	1999 XJ_{126}	—	December 7, 1999	Catalina	CSS	V	1.7 km	MPC · JPL
75433	1999 XK_{126}	—	December 7, 1999	Catalina	CSS	·	9.4 km	MPC · JPL
75434	1999 XT_{126}	—	December 7, 1999	Catalina	CSS	·	2.3 km	MPC · JPL
75435	1999 XX_{126}	—	December 7, 1999	Catalina	CSS	·	2.4 km	MPC · JPL
75436	1999 XY_{126}	—	December 7, 1999	Catalina	CSS	·	3.2 km	MPC · JPL
75437	1999 XN_{127}	—	December 6, 1999	Ondřejov	P. Kušnirák	·	3.2 km	MPC · JPL
75438	1999 XJ_{128}	—	December 7, 1999	Socorro	LINEAR	·	3.0 km	MPC · JPL
75439	1999 XN_{128}	—	December 7, 1999	Socorro	LINEAR	MAS	1.6 km	MPC · JPL
75440	1999 XQ_{128}	—	December 7, 1999	Socorro	LINEAR	·	2.3 km	MPC · JPL
75441	1999 XB_{129}	—	December 12, 1999	Socorro	LINEAR	·	2.8 km	MPC · JPL
75442	1999 XN_{129}	—	December 12, 1999	Socorro	LINEAR	·	3.0 km	MPC · JPL
75443	1999 XS_{129}	—	December 12, 1999	Socorro	LINEAR	·	2.0 km	MPC · JPL
75444	1999 XU_{131}	—	December 12, 1999	Socorro	LINEAR	V	1.9 km	MPC · JPL
75445	1999 XJ_{132}	—	December 12, 1999	Socorro	LINEAR	·	2.5 km	MPC · JPL
75446	1999 XV_{133}	—	December 12, 1999	Socorro	LINEAR	MAR	2.3 km	MPC · JPL
75447	1999 XJ_{135}	—	December 6, 1999	Socorro	LINEAR	·	6.5 km	MPC · JPL
75448	1999 XV_{135}	—	December 8, 1999	Socorro	LINEAR	GAL	4.3 km	MPC · JPL
75449	1999 XH_{137}	—	December 15, 1999	Prescott	P. G. Comba	·	5.8 km	MPC · JPL
75450	1999 XR_{137}	—	December 10, 1999	Uccle	T. Pauwels	·	2.1 km	MPC · JPL
75451	1999 XB_{139}	—	December 5, 1999	Kitt Peak	Spacewatch	·	3.7 km	MPC · JPL
75452	1999 XP_{142}	—	December 12, 1999	Socorro	LINEAR	PHO	3.7 km	MPC · JPL
75453	1999 XS_{142}	—	December 13, 1999	Socorro	LINEAR	·	7.3 km	MPC · JPL
75454	1999 XL_{144}	—	December 15, 1999	Fountain Hills	C. W. Juels	·	4.7 km	MPC · JPL
75455	1999 XL_{145}	—	December 7, 1999	Kitt Peak	Spacewatch	·	2.5 km	MPC · JPL
75456	1999 XR_{145}	—	December 7, 1999	Kitt Peak	Spacewatch	·	1.9 km	MPC · JPL
75457	1999 XF_{146}	—	December 7, 1999	Kitt Peak	Spacewatch	NYS	1.7 km	MPC · JPL
75458	1999 XS_{147}	—	December 7, 1999	Kitt Peak	Spacewatch	NYS	2.8 km	MPC · JPL
75459	1999 XM_{151}	—	December 7, 1999	Kitt Peak	Spacewatch	·	3.2 km	MPC · JPL
75460	1999 XO_{152}	—	December 13, 1999	Anderson Mesa	LONEOS	·	2.2 km	MPC · JPL
75461	1999 XW_{155}	—	December 8, 1999	Socorro	LINEAR	·	2.6 km	MPC · JPL
75462	1999 XB_{156}	—	December 8, 1999	Socorro	LINEAR	EUN	3.0 km	MPC · JPL
75463	1999 XV_{157}	—	December 8, 1999	Socorro	LINEAR	NYS	3.1 km	MPC · JPL
75464	1999 XM_{159}	—	December 8, 1999	Socorro	LINEAR	·	2.5 km	MPC · JPL
75465	1999 XN_{159}	—	December 8, 1999	Socorro	LINEAR	NYS	2.4 km	MPC · JPL
75466	1999 XU_{159}	—	December 8, 1999	Socorro	LINEAR	·	2.9 km	MPC · JPL
75467	1999 XS_{160}	—	December 9, 1999	Catalina	CSS	·	5.5 km	MPC · JPL
75468	1999 XC_{161}	—	December 12, 1999	Socorro	LINEAR	·	2.5 km	MPC · JPL
75469	1999 XU_{162}	—	December 8, 1999	Kitt Peak	Spacewatch	·	2.4 km	MPC · JPL
75470	1999 XT_{164}	—	December 8, 1999	Socorro	LINEAR	·	3.9 km	MPC · JPL
75471	1999 XW_{164}	—	December 8, 1999	Socorro	LINEAR	·	3.5 km	MPC · JPL
75472	1999 XX_{164}	—	December 8, 1999	Socorro	LINEAR	·	5.8 km	MPC · JPL
75473	1999 XY_{164}	—	December 8, 1999	Socorro	LINEAR	(6769)	7.5 km	MPC · JPL
75474	1999 XQ_{165}	—	December 8, 1999	Socorro	LINEAR	·	3.8 km	MPC · JPL
75475	1999 XC_{166}	—	December 10, 1999	Socorro	LINEAR	PHO	2.9 km	MPC · JPL
75476	1999 XS_{166}	—	December 10, 1999	Socorro	LINEAR	·	2.9 km	MPC · JPL
75477	1999 XC_{167}	—	December 10, 1999	Socorro	LINEAR	·	2.7 km	MPC · JPL
75478	1999 XG_{167}	—	December 10, 1999	Socorro	LINEAR	·	2.3 km	MPC · JPL
75479	1999 XH_{170}	—	December 10, 1999	Socorro	LINEAR	·	2.5 km	MPC · JPL
75480	1999 XZ_{171}	—	December 10, 1999	Socorro	LINEAR	·	6.2 km	MPC · JPL
75481	1999 XB_{172}	—	December 10, 1999	Socorro	LINEAR	·	4.3 km	MPC · JPL
75482	1999 XC_{173}	—	December 10, 1999	Socorro	LINEAR	slow	4.6 km	MPC · JPL
75483	1999 XE_{173}	—	December 10, 1999	Socorro	LINEAR	·	5.9 km	MPC · JPL
75484	1999 XP_{173}	—	December 10, 1999	Socorro	LINEAR	·	3.0 km	MPC · JPL
75485	1999 XC_{174}	—	December 10, 1999	Socorro	LINEAR	·	3.5 km	MPC · JPL
75486	1999 XO_{174}	—	December 10, 1999	Socorro	LINEAR	·	4.9 km	MPC · JPL
75487	1999 XZ_{175}	—	December 10, 1999	Socorro	LINEAR	·	5.1 km	MPC · JPL
75488	1999 XT_{177}	—	December 10, 1999	Socorro	LINEAR	EUN	2.6 km	MPC · JPL
75489	1999 XO_{178}	—	December 10, 1999	Socorro	LINEAR	·	1.5 km	MPC · JPL
75490	1999 XQ_{178}	—	December 10, 1999	Socorro	LINEAR	EUN	6.4 km	MPC · JPL
75491	1999 XZ_{178}	—	December 10, 1999	Socorro	LINEAR	·	4.4 km	MPC · JPL
75492	1999 XK_{179}	—	December 10, 1999	Socorro	LINEAR	·	4.2 km	MPC · JPL
75493	1999 XG_{180}	—	December 10, 1999	Socorro	LINEAR	·	4.0 km	MPC · JPL
75494	1999 XH_{181}	—	December 12, 1999	Socorro	LINEAR	·	2.0 km	MPC · JPL
75495	1999 XM_{181}	—	December 12, 1999	Socorro	LINEAR	·	2.0 km	MPC · JPL
75496	1999 XD_{182}	—	December 12, 1999	Socorro	LINEAR	·	4.8 km	MPC · JPL
75497	1999 XW_{183}	—	December 12, 1999	Socorro	LINEAR	·	3.9 km	MPC · JPL
75498	1999 XA_{184}	—	December 12, 1999	Socorro	LINEAR	·	3.3 km	MPC · JPL
75499	1999 XP_{184}	—	December 12, 1999	Socorro	LINEAR	·	3.1 km	MPC · JPL
75500	1999 XQ_{184}	—	December 12, 1999	Socorro	LINEAR	·	2.5 km	MPC · JPL

== 75501–75600 ==
back to top

Designation			Discovery			Properties		Ref
Permanent	Provisional	Named after	Date	Site	Discoverer(s)	Category	Diam.	Ref
75501	1999 XB_{185}	—	December 12, 1999	Socorro	LINEAR	·	3.2 km	MPC · JPL
75502	1999 XZ_{185}	—	December 12, 1999	Socorro	LINEAR	·	4.7 km	MPC · JPL
75503	1999 XX_{186}	—	December 12, 1999	Socorro	LINEAR	·	2.6 km	MPC · JPL
75504	1999 XK_{189}	—	December 12, 1999	Socorro	LINEAR	·	3.3 km	MPC · JPL
75505	1999 XC_{192}	—	December 12, 1999	Socorro	LINEAR	·	2.5 km	MPC · JPL
75506	1999 XW_{193}	—	December 12, 1999	Socorro	LINEAR	V	1.4 km	MPC · JPL
75507	1999 XO_{195}	—	December 12, 1999	Socorro	LINEAR	·	3.4 km	MPC · JPL
75508	1999 XV_{196}	—	December 12, 1999	Socorro	LINEAR	·	3.8 km	MPC · JPL
75509	1999 XL_{197}	—	December 12, 1999	Socorro	LINEAR	·	5.8 km	MPC · JPL
75510	1999 XO_{198}	—	December 12, 1999	Socorro	LINEAR	V	1.8 km	MPC · JPL
75511	1999 XS_{200}	—	December 12, 1999	Socorro	LINEAR	·	4.1 km	MPC · JPL
75512	1999 XW_{202}	—	December 12, 1999	Socorro	LINEAR	·	4.2 km	MPC · JPL
75513	1999 XY_{202}	—	December 12, 1999	Socorro	LINEAR	GEF	2.3 km	MPC · JPL
75514	1999 XD_{203}	—	December 12, 1999	Socorro	LINEAR	·	4.8 km	MPC · JPL
75515	1999 XM_{203}	—	December 12, 1999	Socorro	LINEAR	EUN	5.2 km	MPC · JPL
75516	1999 XV_{203}	—	December 12, 1999	Socorro	LINEAR	EUN	2.2 km	MPC · JPL
75517	1999 XY_{203}	—	December 12, 1999	Socorro	LINEAR	MAR	2.7 km	MPC · JPL
75518	1999 XE_{205}	—	December 12, 1999	Socorro	LINEAR	·	3.8 km	MPC · JPL
75519	1999 XM_{205}	—	December 12, 1999	Socorro	LINEAR	·	3.1 km	MPC · JPL
75520	1999 XN_{205}	—	December 12, 1999	Socorro	LINEAR	ADE	9.6 km	MPC · JPL
75521	1999 XO_{206}	—	December 12, 1999	Socorro	LINEAR	·	3.2 km	MPC · JPL
75522	1999 XW_{206}	—	December 12, 1999	Socorro	LINEAR	·	3.9 km	MPC · JPL
75523	1999 XX_{206}	—	December 12, 1999	Socorro	LINEAR	ADE	9.1 km	MPC · JPL
75524	1999 XA_{207}	—	December 12, 1999	Socorro	LINEAR	·	7.8 km	MPC · JPL
75525	1999 XQ_{209}	—	December 13, 1999	Socorro	LINEAR	·	3.2 km	MPC · JPL
75526	1999 XV_{211}	—	December 13, 1999	Socorro	LINEAR	EUN	4.8 km	MPC · JPL
75527	1999 XY_{213}	—	December 14, 1999	Socorro	LINEAR	PHO	2.5 km	MPC · JPL
75528	1999 XC_{214}	—	December 14, 1999	Socorro	LINEAR	EUN	3.0 km	MPC · JPL
75529	1999 XF_{215}	—	December 14, 1999	Socorro	LINEAR	·	2.3 km	MPC · JPL
75530	1999 XA_{218}	—	December 13, 1999	Kitt Peak	Spacewatch	·	3.0 km	MPC · JPL
75531	1999 XL_{218}	—	December 13, 1999	Kitt Peak	Spacewatch	·	5.7 km	MPC · JPL
75532	1999 XN_{220}	—	December 13, 1999	Socorro	LINEAR	V	1.3 km	MPC · JPL
75533	1999 XM_{226}	—	December 14, 1999	Kitt Peak	Spacewatch	NYS	3.4 km	MPC · JPL
75534	1999 XM_{227}	—	December 15, 1999	Kitt Peak	Spacewatch	(5)	2.7 km	MPC · JPL
75535	1999 XG_{228}	—	December 14, 1999	Kitt Peak	Spacewatch	·	2.5 km	MPC · JPL
75536	1999 XB_{230}	—	December 7, 1999	Anderson Mesa	LONEOS	·	2.8 km	MPC · JPL
75537	1999 XN_{230}	—	December 7, 1999	Anderson Mesa	LONEOS	·	2.3 km	MPC · JPL
75538	1999 XV_{230}	—	December 7, 1999	Catalina	CSS	·	2.6 km	MPC · JPL
75539	1999 XY_{232}	—	December 12, 1999	Socorro	LINEAR	PHO	2.8 km	MPC · JPL
75540	1999 XJ_{233}	—	December 3, 1999	Anderson Mesa	LONEOS	·	2.5 km	MPC · JPL
75541	1999 XY_{234}	—	December 3, 1999	Anderson Mesa	LONEOS	·	1.6 km	MPC · JPL
75542	1999 XN_{237}	—	December 5, 1999	Catalina	CSS	MAS	1.9 km	MPC · JPL
75543	1999 XY_{241}	—	December 13, 1999	Catalina	CSS	V	1.6 km	MPC · JPL
75544	1999 XN_{248}	—	December 6, 1999	Socorro	LINEAR	·	2.6 km	MPC · JPL
75545	1999 XS_{251}	—	December 9, 1999	Kitt Peak	Spacewatch	·	2.2 km	MPC · JPL
75546	1999 XC_{256}	—	December 6, 1999	Socorro	LINEAR	V	1.4 km	MPC · JPL
75547	1999 XV_{257}	—	December 7, 1999	Socorro	LINEAR	·	2.5 km	MPC · JPL
75548	1999 XG_{259}	—	December 8, 1999	Socorro	LINEAR	·	2.9 km	MPC · JPL
75549	1999 XL_{260}	—	December 8, 1999	Socorro	LINEAR	·	4.0 km	MPC · JPL
75550	1999 YT_{1}	—	December 16, 1999	Socorro	LINEAR	·	4.1 km	MPC · JPL
75551	1999 YL_{4}	—	December 27, 1999	Farpoint	G. Hug, G. Bell	·	4.3 km	MPC · JPL
75552	1999 YO_{5}	—	December 28, 1999	Socorro	LINEAR	PHO	2.8 km	MPC · JPL
75553	1999 YQ_{6}	—	December 30, 1999	Socorro	LINEAR	EUN	3.3 km	MPC · JPL
75554	1999 YD_{12}	—	December 27, 1999	Kitt Peak	Spacewatch	·	1.8 km	MPC · JPL
75555 Wonaszek	1999 YW_{14}	Wonaszek	December 31, 1999	Piszkéstető	K. Sárneczky, L. Kiss	·	2.3 km	MPC · JPL
75556	1999 YT_{15}	—	December 31, 1999	Kitt Peak	Spacewatch	·	2.9 km	MPC · JPL
75557	1999 YK_{17}	—	December 31, 1999	Kitt Peak	Spacewatch	·	1.7 km	MPC · JPL
75558	1999 YE_{18}	—	December 30, 1999	Anderson Mesa	LONEOS	·	3.4 km	MPC · JPL
75559	1999 YJ_{18}	—	December 18, 1999	Socorro	LINEAR	·	8.7 km	MPC · JPL
75560	1999 YN_{22}	—	December 31, 1999	Anderson Mesa	LONEOS	·	3.0 km	MPC · JPL
75561	1999 YR_{22}	—	December 31, 1999	Anderson Mesa	LONEOS	V	2.0 km	MPC · JPL
75562 Wilkening	1999 YV_{22}	Wilkening	December 31, 1999	Catalina	CSS	EUN	2.7 km	MPC · JPL
75563	1999 YA_{23}	—	December 30, 1999	Anderson Mesa	LONEOS	·	3.2 km	MPC · JPL
75564 Audubon	2000 AJ	Audubon	January 2, 2000	Fountain Hills	C. W. Juels	·	2.8 km	MPC · JPL
75565	2000 AY	—	January 2, 2000	Kitt Peak	Spacewatch	·	2.7 km	MPC · JPL
75566	2000 AZ	—	January 2, 2000	Kitt Peak	Spacewatch	·	3.8 km	MPC · JPL
75567	2000 AK_{1}	—	January 2, 2000	Socorro	LINEAR	·	2.5 km	MPC · JPL
75568	2000 AR_{1}	—	January 2, 2000	Višnjan Observatory	K. Korlević	V	2.2 km	MPC · JPL
75569 IRSOL	2000 AD_{2}	IRSOL	January 2, 2000	Gnosca	S. Sposetti	·	2.5 km	MPC · JPL
75570 Jenőwigner	2000 AP_{4}	Jenőwigner	January 1, 2000	Piszkéstető	K. Sárneczky, L. Kiss	·	5.8 km	MPC · JPL
75571	2000 AT_{4}	—	January 3, 2000	Powell	Powell	V	1.6 km	MPC · JPL
75572	2000 AO_{6}	—	January 4, 2000	Prescott	P. G. Comba	·	4.6 km	MPC · JPL
75573	2000 AE_{8}	—	January 2, 2000	Socorro	LINEAR	·	4.2 km	MPC · JPL
75574	2000 AZ_{8}	—	January 2, 2000	Socorro	LINEAR	·	3.8 km	MPC · JPL
75575	2000 AQ_{9}	—	January 2, 2000	Socorro	LINEAR	·	2.6 km	MPC · JPL
75576	2000 AA_{10}	—	January 3, 2000	Socorro	LINEAR	·	4.1 km	MPC · JPL
75577	2000 AD_{11}	—	January 3, 2000	Socorro	LINEAR	·	2.6 km	MPC · JPL
75578	2000 AV_{11}	—	January 3, 2000	Socorro	LINEAR	·	2.3 km	MPC · JPL
75579	2000 AS_{12}	—	January 3, 2000	Socorro	LINEAR	MAS	1.5 km	MPC · JPL
75580	2000 AF_{13}	—	January 3, 2000	Socorro	LINEAR	NYS	2.3 km	MPC · JPL
75581	2000 AN_{13}	—	January 3, 2000	Socorro	LINEAR	NYS	2.2 km	MPC · JPL
75582	2000 AV_{13}	—	January 3, 2000	Socorro	LINEAR	·	3.1 km	MPC · JPL
75583	2000 AR_{14}	—	January 3, 2000	Socorro	LINEAR	NYS	2.4 km	MPC · JPL
75584	2000 AX_{14}	—	January 3, 2000	Socorro	LINEAR	·	3.1 km	MPC · JPL
75585	2000 AU_{15}	—	January 3, 2000	Socorro	LINEAR	V	2.1 km	MPC · JPL
75586	2000 AZ_{15}	—	January 3, 2000	Socorro	LINEAR	·	3.6 km	MPC · JPL
75587	2000 AK_{16}	—	January 3, 2000	Socorro	LINEAR	V	2.0 km	MPC · JPL
75588	2000 AQ_{16}	—	January 3, 2000	Socorro	LINEAR	·	5.1 km	MPC · JPL
75589	2000 AX_{16}	—	January 3, 2000	Socorro	LINEAR	·	3.2 km	MPC · JPL
75590	2000 AH_{17}	—	January 3, 2000	Socorro	LINEAR	V	1.8 km	MPC · JPL
75591 Stonemose	2000 AN_{18}	Stonemose	January 3, 2000	Socorro	LINEAR	V	2.1 km	MPC · JPL
75592	2000 AH_{19}	—	January 3, 2000	Socorro	LINEAR	·	4.2 km	MPC · JPL
75593	2000 AT_{19}	—	January 3, 2000	Socorro	LINEAR	·	2.5 km	MPC · JPL
75594	2000 AN_{21}	—	January 3, 2000	Socorro	LINEAR	(5)	3.0 km	MPC · JPL
75595	2000 AM_{22}	—	January 3, 2000	Socorro	LINEAR	NYS	3.2 km	MPC · JPL
75596	2000 AA_{23}	—	January 3, 2000	Socorro	LINEAR	·	2.7 km	MPC · JPL
75597	2000 AS_{23}	—	January 3, 2000	Socorro	LINEAR	·	3.5 km	MPC · JPL
75598	2000 AY_{23}	—	January 3, 2000	Socorro	LINEAR	·	3.5 km	MPC · JPL
75599	2000 AG_{24}	—	January 3, 2000	Socorro	LINEAR	·	4.0 km	MPC · JPL
75600	2000 AQ_{27}	—	January 3, 2000	Socorro	LINEAR	·	3.5 km	MPC · JPL

== 75601–75700 ==
back to top

Designation			Discovery			Properties		Ref
Permanent	Provisional	Named after	Date	Site	Discoverer(s)	Category	Diam.	Ref
75601	2000 AB_{28}	—	January 3, 2000	Socorro	LINEAR	·	3.1 km	MPC · JPL
75602	2000 AF_{28}	—	January 3, 2000	Socorro	LINEAR	MAS	1.8 km	MPC · JPL
75603	2000 AT_{28}	—	January 3, 2000	Socorro	LINEAR	·	3.8 km	MPC · JPL
75604	2000 AZ_{30}	—	January 3, 2000	Socorro	LINEAR	MAR	2.6 km	MPC · JPL
75605	2000 AA_{32}	—	January 3, 2000	Socorro	LINEAR	V	1.7 km	MPC · JPL
75606	2000 AL_{32}	—	January 3, 2000	Socorro	LINEAR	EUN	3.6 km	MPC · JPL
75607	2000 AD_{33}	—	January 3, 2000	Socorro	LINEAR	·	2.3 km	MPC · JPL
75608	2000 AC_{34}	—	January 3, 2000	Socorro	LINEAR	EUN	4.5 km	MPC · JPL
75609	2000 AF_{34}	—	January 3, 2000	Socorro	LINEAR	·	3.6 km	MPC · JPL
75610	2000 AU_{34}	—	January 3, 2000	Socorro	LINEAR	·	4.6 km	MPC · JPL
75611	2000 AB_{38}	—	January 3, 2000	Socorro	LINEAR	·	2.7 km	MPC · JPL
75612	2000 AE_{38}	—	January 3, 2000	Socorro	LINEAR	EUN	3.2 km	MPC · JPL
75613	2000 AJ_{39}	—	January 3, 2000	Socorro	LINEAR	·	2.6 km	MPC · JPL
75614	2000 AS_{40}	—	January 3, 2000	Socorro	LINEAR	MRX	2.9 km	MPC · JPL
75615	2000 AU_{40}	—	January 3, 2000	Socorro	LINEAR	·	2.9 km	MPC · JPL
75616	2000 AX_{40}	—	January 3, 2000	Socorro	LINEAR	(5)	2.5 km	MPC · JPL
75617	2000 AA_{41}	—	January 3, 2000	Socorro	LINEAR	V	3.3 km	MPC · JPL
75618	2000 AM_{42}	—	January 3, 2000	Socorro	LINEAR	PHO	2.9 km	MPC · JPL
75619	2000 AO_{42}	—	January 4, 2000	Socorro	LINEAR	·	3.4 km	MPC · JPL
75620	2000 AP_{42}	—	January 4, 2000	Socorro	LINEAR	·	2.3 km	MPC · JPL
75621	2000 AG_{43}	—	January 5, 2000	Socorro	LINEAR	PHO	3.1 km	MPC · JPL
75622	2000 AH_{46}	—	January 3, 2000	Socorro	LINEAR	·	2.7 km	MPC · JPL
75623	2000 AO_{47}	—	January 4, 2000	Socorro	LINEAR	(5)	2.8 km	MPC · JPL
75624	2000 AR_{47}	—	January 4, 2000	Socorro	LINEAR	NYS	2.8 km	MPC · JPL
75625	2000 AA_{48}	—	January 4, 2000	Socorro	LINEAR	·	2.6 km	MPC · JPL
75626	2000 AQ_{48}	—	January 4, 2000	Socorro	LINEAR	·	2.9 km	MPC · JPL
75627	2000 AT_{48}	—	January 5, 2000	Socorro	LINEAR	·	1.9 km	MPC · JPL
75628	2000 AU_{48}	—	January 5, 2000	Socorro	LINEAR	·	3.0 km	MPC · JPL
75629	2000 AK_{50}	—	January 6, 2000	Višnjan Observatory	K. Korlević	(194)	3.4 km	MPC · JPL
75630	2000 AR_{51}	—	January 4, 2000	Socorro	LINEAR	V	2.4 km	MPC · JPL
75631	2000 AV_{51}	—	January 4, 2000	Socorro	LINEAR	(2076)	2.7 km	MPC · JPL
75632	2000 AY_{51}	—	January 4, 2000	Socorro	LINEAR	V	2.3 km	MPC · JPL
75633	2000 AF_{52}	—	January 4, 2000	Socorro	LINEAR	DOR	4.9 km	MPC · JPL
75634	2000 AQ_{52}	—	January 4, 2000	Socorro	LINEAR	·	3.0 km	MPC · JPL
75635	2000 AY_{52}	—	January 4, 2000	Socorro	LINEAR	·	4.0 km	MPC · JPL
75636	2000 AE_{53}	—	January 4, 2000	Socorro	LINEAR	V	1.9 km	MPC · JPL
75637	2000 AQ_{53}	—	January 4, 2000	Socorro	LINEAR	V	2.0 km	MPC · JPL
75638	2000 AW_{53}	—	January 4, 2000	Socorro	LINEAR	·	3.1 km	MPC · JPL
75639	2000 AV_{54}	—	January 4, 2000	Socorro	LINEAR	V	1.3 km	MPC · JPL
75640	2000 AE_{55}	—	January 4, 2000	Socorro	LINEAR	EUN	3.9 km	MPC · JPL
75641	2000 AS_{55}	—	January 4, 2000	Socorro	LINEAR	·	3.4 km	MPC · JPL
75642	2000 AD_{56}	—	January 4, 2000	Socorro	LINEAR	·	2.6 km	MPC · JPL
75643	2000 AR_{57}	—	January 4, 2000	Socorro	LINEAR	·	3.0 km	MPC · JPL
75644	2000 AE_{58}	—	January 4, 2000	Socorro	LINEAR	·	5.9 km	MPC · JPL
75645	2000 AR_{58}	—	January 4, 2000	Socorro	LINEAR	·	3.1 km	MPC · JPL
75646	2000 AD_{59}	—	January 4, 2000	Socorro	LINEAR	·	3.1 km	MPC · JPL
75647	2000 AR_{59}	—	January 4, 2000	Socorro	LINEAR	THB	12 km	MPC · JPL
75648	2000 AW_{59}	—	January 4, 2000	Socorro	LINEAR	·	3.9 km	MPC · JPL
75649	2000 AE_{62}	—	January 4, 2000	Socorro	LINEAR	PHO · slow	3.5 km	MPC · JPL
75650	2000 AO_{63}	—	January 4, 2000	Socorro	LINEAR	·	2.8 km	MPC · JPL
75651	2000 AS_{63}	—	January 4, 2000	Socorro	LINEAR	·	3.6 km	MPC · JPL
75652	2000 AZ_{63}	—	January 4, 2000	Socorro	LINEAR	·	2.9 km	MPC · JPL
75653	2000 AG_{64}	—	January 4, 2000	Socorro	LINEAR	·	5.2 km	MPC · JPL
75654	2000 AV_{65}	—	January 4, 2000	Socorro	LINEAR	·	4.2 km	MPC · JPL
75655	2000 AT_{66}	—	January 4, 2000	Socorro	LINEAR	DOR	5.3 km	MPC · JPL
75656	2000 AS_{68}	—	January 5, 2000	Socorro	LINEAR	·	2.8 km	MPC · JPL
75657	2000 AW_{75}	—	January 5, 2000	Socorro	LINEAR	NYS	2.4 km	MPC · JPL
75658	2000 AE_{76}	—	January 5, 2000	Socorro	LINEAR	·	1.8 km	MPC · JPL
75659	2000 AP_{76}	—	January 5, 2000	Socorro	LINEAR	·	4.6 km	MPC · JPL
75660	2000 AG_{77}	—	January 5, 2000	Socorro	LINEAR	·	3.7 km	MPC · JPL
75661	2000 AB_{79}	—	January 5, 2000	Socorro	LINEAR	·	3.3 km	MPC · JPL
75662	2000 AG_{79}	—	January 5, 2000	Socorro	LINEAR	·	3.0 km	MPC · JPL
75663	2000 AB_{81}	—	January 5, 2000	Socorro	LINEAR	·	2.4 km	MPC · JPL
75664	2000 AX_{82}	—	January 5, 2000	Socorro	LINEAR	·	3.2 km	MPC · JPL
75665	2000 AY_{83}	—	January 5, 2000	Socorro	LINEAR	·	2.7 km	MPC · JPL
75666	2000 AG_{85}	—	January 5, 2000	Socorro	LINEAR	·	2.9 km	MPC · JPL
75667	2000 AM_{86}	—	January 5, 2000	Socorro	LINEAR	·	2.8 km	MPC · JPL
75668	2000 AW_{87}	—	January 5, 2000	Socorro	LINEAR	KOR	2.8 km	MPC · JPL
75669	2000 AH_{88}	—	January 5, 2000	Socorro	LINEAR	NYS	2.9 km	MPC · JPL
75670	2000 AN_{89}	—	January 5, 2000	Socorro	LINEAR	·	5.7 km	MPC · JPL
75671	2000 AG_{92}	—	January 5, 2000	Socorro	LINEAR	·	6.4 km	MPC · JPL
75672	2000 AH_{92}	—	January 5, 2000	Socorro	LINEAR	·	2.4 km	MPC · JPL
75673	2000 AM_{94}	—	January 4, 2000	Socorro	LINEAR	·	2.7 km	MPC · JPL
75674	2000 AZ_{95}	—	January 4, 2000	Socorro	LINEAR	·	3.3 km	MPC · JPL
75675	2000 AB_{96}	—	January 4, 2000	Socorro	LINEAR	MAR	3.8 km	MPC · JPL
75676	2000 AL_{96}	—	January 4, 2000	Socorro	LINEAR	·	4.6 km	MPC · JPL
75677	2000 AU_{96}	—	January 4, 2000	Socorro	LINEAR	·	5.0 km	MPC · JPL
75678	2000 AA_{97}	—	January 4, 2000	Socorro	LINEAR	·	3.9 km	MPC · JPL
75679	2000 AU_{97}	—	January 4, 2000	Socorro	LINEAR	·	6.2 km	MPC · JPL
75680	2000 AW_{97}	—	January 4, 2000	Socorro	LINEAR	·	3.9 km	MPC · JPL
75681	2000 AL_{98}	—	January 4, 2000	Socorro	LINEAR	·	3.9 km	MPC · JPL
75682	2000 AC_{99}	—	January 5, 2000	Socorro	LINEAR	·	2.7 km	MPC · JPL
75683	2000 AH_{99}	—	January 5, 2000	Socorro	LINEAR	NYS	2.6 km	MPC · JPL
75684	2000 AN_{99}	—	January 5, 2000	Socorro	LINEAR	·	2.6 km	MPC · JPL
75685	2000 AX_{99}	—	January 5, 2000	Socorro	LINEAR	(5)	3.1 km	MPC · JPL
75686	2000 AQ_{100}	—	January 5, 2000	Socorro	LINEAR	PHO	3.6 km	MPC · JPL
75687	2000 AR_{100}	—	January 5, 2000	Socorro	LINEAR	·	2.4 km	MPC · JPL
75688	2000 AG_{101}	—	January 5, 2000	Socorro	LINEAR	·	4.0 km	MPC · JPL
75689	2000 AD_{103}	—	January 5, 2000	Socorro	LINEAR	·	3.5 km	MPC · JPL
75690	2000 AO_{103}	—	January 5, 2000	Socorro	LINEAR	·	2.7 km	MPC · JPL
75691	2000 AQ_{103}	—	January 5, 2000	Socorro	LINEAR	V	1.8 km	MPC · JPL
75692	2000 AW_{103}	—	January 5, 2000	Socorro	LINEAR	MAR	3.2 km	MPC · JPL
75693	2000 AJ_{104}	—	January 5, 2000	Socorro	LINEAR	·	2.6 km	MPC · JPL
75694	2000 AU_{104}	—	January 5, 2000	Socorro	LINEAR	·	2.6 km	MPC · JPL
75695	2000 AK_{106}	—	January 5, 2000	Socorro	LINEAR	·	4.4 km	MPC · JPL
75696	2000 AJ_{109}	—	January 5, 2000	Socorro	LINEAR	·	3.5 km	MPC · JPL
75697	2000 AP_{110}	—	January 5, 2000	Socorro	LINEAR	·	3.0 km	MPC · JPL
75698	2000 AS_{110}	—	January 5, 2000	Socorro	LINEAR	·	3.5 km	MPC · JPL
75699	2000 AB_{112}	—	January 5, 2000	Socorro	LINEAR	·	4.2 km	MPC · JPL
75700	2000 AU_{112}	—	January 5, 2000	Socorro	LINEAR	·	3.9 km	MPC · JPL

== 75701–75800 ==
back to top

Designation			Discovery			Properties		Ref
Permanent	Provisional	Named after	Date	Site	Discoverer(s)	Category	Diam.	Ref
75701	2000 AF_{113}	—	January 5, 2000	Socorro	LINEAR	·	4.1 km	MPC · JPL
75702	2000 AN_{114}	—	January 5, 2000	Socorro	LINEAR	(5)	3.2 km	MPC · JPL
75703	2000 AM_{115}	—	January 5, 2000	Socorro	LINEAR	V	2.8 km	MPC · JPL
75704	2000 AV_{115}	—	January 5, 2000	Socorro	LINEAR	·	2.9 km	MPC · JPL
75705	2000 AP_{116}	—	January 5, 2000	Socorro	LINEAR	·	3.5 km	MPC · JPL
75706	2000 AJ_{117}	—	January 5, 2000	Socorro	LINEAR	·	3.3 km	MPC · JPL
75707	2000 AL_{117}	—	January 5, 2000	Socorro	LINEAR	MAR	3.2 km	MPC · JPL
75708	2000 AR_{117}	—	January 5, 2000	Socorro	LINEAR	·	4.6 km	MPC · JPL
75709	2000 AB_{118}	—	January 5, 2000	Socorro	LINEAR	·	3.2 km	MPC · JPL
75710	2000 AC_{118}	—	January 5, 2000	Socorro	LINEAR	KON	5.9 km	MPC · JPL
75711	2000 AM_{118}	—	January 5, 2000	Socorro	LINEAR	·	3.5 km	MPC · JPL
75712	2000 AQ_{118}	—	January 5, 2000	Socorro	LINEAR	·	4.0 km	MPC · JPL
75713	2000 AR_{118}	—	January 5, 2000	Socorro	LINEAR	·	12 km	MPC · JPL
75714	2000 AT_{118}	—	January 5, 2000	Socorro	LINEAR	·	4.1 km	MPC · JPL
75715	2000 AM_{120}	—	January 5, 2000	Socorro	LINEAR	·	3.2 km	MPC · JPL
75716	2000 AS_{120}	—	January 5, 2000	Socorro	LINEAR	·	2.9 km	MPC · JPL
75717	2000 AU_{120}	—	January 5, 2000	Socorro	LINEAR	·	4.1 km	MPC · JPL
75718	2000 AA_{122}	—	January 5, 2000	Socorro	LINEAR	PHO	3.2 km	MPC · JPL
75719	2000 AZ_{122}	—	January 5, 2000	Socorro	LINEAR	NEM	4.4 km	MPC · JPL
75720	2000 AK_{127}	—	January 5, 2000	Socorro	LINEAR	RAF	4.2 km	MPC · JPL
75721	2000 AS_{127}	—	January 5, 2000	Socorro	LINEAR	·	4.0 km	MPC · JPL
75722	2000 AB_{128}	—	January 5, 2000	Socorro	LINEAR	·	3.0 km	MPC · JPL
75723	2000 AJ_{128}	—	January 5, 2000	Socorro	LINEAR	·	4.0 km	MPC · JPL
75724	2000 AX_{129}	—	January 5, 2000	Socorro	LINEAR	·	3.6 km	MPC · JPL
75725	2000 AD_{131}	—	January 6, 2000	Socorro	LINEAR	·	3.3 km	MPC · JPL
75726	2000 AG_{131}	—	January 6, 2000	Socorro	LINEAR	EUN	3.0 km	MPC · JPL
75727	2000 AO_{131}	—	January 2, 2000	Socorro	LINEAR	·	3.0 km	MPC · JPL
75728	2000 AJ_{132}	—	January 3, 2000	Socorro	LINEAR	·	2.2 km	MPC · JPL
75729	2000 AH_{133}	—	January 3, 2000	Socorro	LINEAR	·	3.7 km	MPC · JPL
75730	2000 AS_{134}	—	January 4, 2000	Socorro	LINEAR	·	2.8 km	MPC · JPL
75731	2000 AX_{134}	—	January 4, 2000	Socorro	LINEAR	GEF	2.5 km	MPC · JPL
75732	2000 AS_{135}	—	January 4, 2000	Socorro	LINEAR	(5)	2.0 km	MPC · JPL
75733	2000 AJ_{137}	—	January 4, 2000	Socorro	LINEAR	·	3.6 km	MPC · JPL
75734	2000 AF_{139}	—	January 5, 2000	Socorro	LINEAR	·	3.1 km	MPC · JPL
75735	2000 AZ_{139}	—	January 5, 2000	Socorro	LINEAR	·	2.2 km	MPC · JPL
75736	2000 AA_{143}	—	January 5, 2000	Socorro	LINEAR	EUN	3.0 km	MPC · JPL
75737	2000 AS_{144}	—	January 5, 2000	Socorro	LINEAR	·	6.0 km	MPC · JPL
75738	2000 AF_{145}	—	January 6, 2000	Socorro	LINEAR	PHO	3.2 km	MPC · JPL
75739	2000 AQ_{145}	—	January 6, 2000	Socorro	LINEAR	DOR	7.7 km	MPC · JPL
75740	2000 AF_{148}	—	January 5, 2000	Socorro	LINEAR	MAR	2.3 km	MPC · JPL
75741	2000 AK_{149}	—	January 7, 2000	Socorro	LINEAR	·	5.8 km	MPC · JPL
75742	2000 AQ_{149}	—	January 7, 2000	Socorro	LINEAR	(5)	3.2 km	MPC · JPL
75743	2000 AF_{150}	—	January 7, 2000	Socorro	LINEAR	·	4.1 km	MPC · JPL
75744	2000 AF_{151}	—	January 10, 2000	Prescott	P. G. Comba	EUN	2.9 km	MPC · JPL
75745	2000 AF_{152}	—	January 8, 2000	Socorro	LINEAR	PHO	3.1 km	MPC · JPL
75746	2000 AD_{153}	—	January 9, 2000	Socorro	LINEAR	PHO	3.7 km	MPC · JPL
75747	2000 AX_{153}	—	January 2, 2000	Socorro	LINEAR	·	2.2 km	MPC · JPL
75748	2000 AY_{154}	—	January 3, 2000	Socorro	LINEAR	·	2.9 km	MPC · JPL
75749	2000 AL_{155}	—	January 3, 2000	Socorro	LINEAR	V	1.5 km	MPC · JPL
75750	2000 AJ_{156}	—	January 3, 2000	Socorro	LINEAR	NYS	2.6 km	MPC · JPL
75751	2000 AR_{158}	—	January 3, 2000	Socorro	LINEAR	·	5.7 km	MPC · JPL
75752	2000 AU_{159}	—	January 3, 2000	Socorro	LINEAR	NYS	2.9 km	MPC · JPL
75753	2000 AH_{160}	—	January 3, 2000	Socorro	LINEAR	·	6.2 km	MPC · JPL
75754	2000 AX_{161}	—	January 4, 2000	Socorro	LINEAR	MAS	1.6 km	MPC · JPL
75755	2000 AF_{162}	—	January 4, 2000	Socorro	LINEAR	·	2.1 km	MPC · JPL
75756	2000 AR_{165}	—	January 8, 2000	Socorro	LINEAR	·	3.6 km	MPC · JPL
75757	2000 AG_{166}	—	January 8, 2000	Socorro	LINEAR	·	13 km	MPC · JPL
75758	2000 AK_{166}	—	January 8, 2000	Socorro	LINEAR	·	3.4 km	MPC · JPL
75759	2000 AH_{168}	—	January 12, 2000	Kleť	Kleť	slow	2.8 km	MPC · JPL
75760	2000 AP_{168}	—	January 12, 2000	Prescott	P. G. Comba	WIT	1.8 km	MPC · JPL
75761	2000 AC_{171}	—	January 7, 2000	Socorro	LINEAR	V	1.8 km	MPC · JPL
75762	2000 AS_{173}	—	January 7, 2000	Socorro	LINEAR	·	5.0 km	MPC · JPL
75763	2000 AV_{178}	—	January 7, 2000	Socorro	LINEAR	EUN · fast	3.7 km	MPC · JPL
75764	2000 AX_{179}	—	January 7, 2000	Socorro	LINEAR	EUN	3.1 km	MPC · JPL
75765	2000 AT_{184}	—	January 7, 2000	Socorro	LINEAR	·	3.5 km	MPC · JPL
75766	2000 AG_{185}	—	January 7, 2000	Socorro	LINEAR	EUN	2.4 km	MPC · JPL
75767	2000 AM_{185}	—	January 7, 2000	Socorro	LINEAR	·	6.0 km	MPC · JPL
75768	2000 AE_{186}	—	January 8, 2000	Socorro	LINEAR	EUN	3.2 km	MPC · JPL
75769	2000 AM_{187}	—	January 8, 2000	Socorro	LINEAR	·	3.7 km	MPC · JPL
75770	2000 AX_{190}	—	January 8, 2000	Socorro	LINEAR	EUN	4.2 km	MPC · JPL
75771	2000 AD_{193}	—	January 8, 2000	Socorro	LINEAR	·	3.6 km	MPC · JPL
75772	2000 AP_{195}	—	January 8, 2000	Socorro	LINEAR	EUN	2.5 km	MPC · JPL
75773	2000 AC_{196}	—	January 8, 2000	Socorro	LINEAR	MAR	3.5 km	MPC · JPL
75774	2000 AF_{196}	—	January 8, 2000	Socorro	LINEAR	·	3.2 km	MPC · JPL
75775	2000 AG_{197}	—	January 8, 2000	Socorro	LINEAR	EUN	4.1 km	MPC · JPL
75776	2000 AC_{198}	—	January 8, 2000	Socorro	LINEAR	·	2.6 km	MPC · JPL
75777	2000 AF_{198}	—	January 8, 2000	Socorro	LINEAR	WAT	5.1 km	MPC · JPL
75778	2000 AY_{198}	—	January 8, 2000	Socorro	LINEAR	·	6.1 km	MPC · JPL
75779	2000 AC_{201}	—	January 9, 2000	Socorro	LINEAR	·	7.1 km	MPC · JPL
75780	2000 AU_{202}	—	January 10, 2000	Socorro	LINEAR	·	4.0 km	MPC · JPL
75781	2000 AA_{203}	—	January 10, 2000	Socorro	LINEAR	·	12 km	MPC · JPL
75782	2000 AG_{203}	—	January 10, 2000	Socorro	LINEAR	·	5.6 km	MPC · JPL
75783	2000 AZ_{204}	—	January 10, 2000	San Marcello	A. Boattini, Cecchini, V.	(11882)	3.2 km	MPC · JPL
75784	2000 AR_{205}	—	January 15, 2000	Višnjan Observatory	K. Korlević	·	3.9 km	MPC · JPL
75785	2000 AS_{205}	—	January 15, 2000	Višnjan Observatory	K. Korlević	·	2.3 km	MPC · JPL
75786	2000 AQ_{207}	—	January 3, 2000	Kitt Peak	Spacewatch	·	2.5 km	MPC · JPL
75787	2000 AG_{210}	—	January 5, 2000	Kitt Peak	Spacewatch	MAR	2.5 km	MPC · JPL
75788	2000 AM_{214}	—	January 6, 2000	Kitt Peak	Spacewatch	·	2.2 km	MPC · JPL
75789	2000 AO_{215}	—	January 7, 2000	Kitt Peak	Spacewatch	·	2.3 km	MPC · JPL
75790	2000 AJ_{218}	—	January 8, 2000	Kitt Peak	Spacewatch	·	3.7 km	MPC · JPL
75791	2000 AH_{219}	—	January 8, 2000	Kitt Peak	Spacewatch	·	3.9 km	MPC · JPL
75792	2000 AV_{224}	—	January 11, 2000	Kitt Peak	Spacewatch	·	2.6 km	MPC · JPL
75793	2000 AZ_{225}	—	January 12, 2000	Kitt Peak	Spacewatch	·	3.6 km	MPC · JPL
75794	2000 AO_{227}	—	January 10, 2000	Kitt Peak	Spacewatch	HOF	6.1 km	MPC · JPL
75795	2000 AZ_{229}	—	January 3, 2000	Socorro	LINEAR	(5)	2.1 km	MPC · JPL
75796	2000 AK_{230}	—	January 3, 2000	Socorro	LINEAR	GEF	6.7 km	MPC · JPL
75797	2000 AN_{232}	—	January 4, 2000	Socorro	LINEAR	·	4.3 km	MPC · JPL
75798	2000 AS_{232}	—	January 4, 2000	Socorro	LINEAR	V	1.7 km	MPC · JPL
75799	2000 AB_{233}	—	January 4, 2000	Socorro	LINEAR	(5)	3.4 km	MPC · JPL
75800	2000 AD_{233}	—	January 4, 2000	Socorro	LINEAR	NYS	4.6 km	MPC · JPL

== 75801–75900 ==
back to top

Designation			Discovery			Properties		Ref
Permanent	Provisional	Named after	Date	Site	Discoverer(s)	Category	Diam.	Ref
75801	2000 AO_{233}	—	January 4, 2000	Socorro	LINEAR	·	4.9 km	MPC · JPL
75802	2000 AQ_{234}	—	January 5, 2000	Socorro	LINEAR	·	4.0 km	MPC · JPL
75803	2000 AX_{234}	—	January 5, 2000	Socorro	LINEAR	·	3.3 km	MPC · JPL
75804	2000 AH_{236}	—	January 5, 2000	Anderson Mesa	LONEOS	EUN	2.5 km	MPC · JPL
75805	2000 AN_{236}	—	January 5, 2000	Kitt Peak	Spacewatch	EOS	4.6 km	MPC · JPL
75806	2000 AW_{237}	—	January 6, 2000	Višnjan Observatory	K. Korlević	·	2.9 km	MPC · JPL
75807	2000 AD_{239}	—	January 6, 2000	Socorro	LINEAR	·	5.0 km	MPC · JPL
75808	2000 AZ_{242}	—	January 7, 2000	Anderson Mesa	LONEOS	·	4.1 km	MPC · JPL
75809	2000 AC_{243}	—	January 7, 2000	Anderson Mesa	LONEOS	CLO	4.8 km	MPC · JPL
75810	2000 AX_{244}	—	January 8, 2000	Socorro	LINEAR	·	2.7 km	MPC · JPL
75811	2000 AZ_{244}	—	January 8, 2000	Socorro	LINEAR	·	6.0 km	MPC · JPL
75812	2000 BF	—	January 16, 2000	Višnjan Observatory	K. Korlević	EUN	2.8 km	MPC · JPL
75813	2000 BK_{3}	—	January 27, 2000	Oizumi	T. Kobayashi	·	4.8 km	MPC · JPL
75814	2000 BX_{3}	—	January 27, 2000	Oizumi	T. Kobayashi	EUN	3.8 km	MPC · JPL
75815	2000 BA_{6}	—	January 28, 2000	Socorro	LINEAR	·	6.1 km	MPC · JPL
75816	2000 BD_{6}	—	January 28, 2000	Socorro	LINEAR	ADE	5.9 km	MPC · JPL
75817	2000 BM_{7}	—	January 29, 2000	Socorro	LINEAR	V	1.8 km	MPC · JPL
75818	2000 BV_{8}	—	January 29, 2000	Socorro	LINEAR	·	3.9 km	MPC · JPL
75819	2000 BW_{8}	—	January 29, 2000	Socorro	LINEAR	·	4.0 km	MPC · JPL
75820	2000 BQ_{11}	—	January 26, 2000	Kitt Peak	Spacewatch	·	2.4 km	MPC · JPL
75821	2000 BU_{12}	—	January 28, 2000	Kitt Peak	Spacewatch	·	4.2 km	MPC · JPL
75822	2000 BH_{15}	—	January 31, 2000	Oizumi	T. Kobayashi	·	5.6 km	MPC · JPL
75823 Csokonai	2000 BJ_{15}	Csokonai	January 28, 2000	Piszkéstető	K. Sárneczky, L. Kiss	·	7.4 km	MPC · JPL
75824	2000 BS_{15}	—	January 29, 2000	Socorro	LINEAR	V	1.8 km	MPC · JPL
75825	2000 BX_{16}	—	January 30, 2000	Socorro	LINEAR	·	3.0 km	MPC · JPL
75826	2000 BH_{17}	—	January 30, 2000	Socorro	LINEAR	·	4.2 km	MPC · JPL
75827	2000 BX_{17}	—	January 30, 2000	Socorro	LINEAR	·	6.1 km	MPC · JPL
75828	2000 BF_{21}	—	January 29, 2000	Kitt Peak	Spacewatch	MAR	2.5 km	MPC · JPL
75829 Alyea	2000 BH_{23}	Alyea	January 30, 2000	Catalina	CSS	·	2.2 km	MPC · JPL
75830	2000 BL_{24}	—	January 29, 2000	Socorro	LINEAR	·	4.3 km	MPC · JPL
75831	2000 BP_{25}	—	January 30, 2000	Socorro	LINEAR	·	3.5 km	MPC · JPL
75832	2000 BU_{25}	—	January 30, 2000	Socorro	LINEAR	·	2.8 km	MPC · JPL
75833	2000 BB_{26}	—	January 30, 2000	Socorro	LINEAR	·	4.0 km	MPC · JPL
75834	2000 BF_{26}	—	January 30, 2000	Socorro	LINEAR	·	3.4 km	MPC · JPL
75835	2000 BO_{26}	—	January 30, 2000	Socorro	LINEAR	·	4.0 km	MPC · JPL
75836 Warrenastro	2000 BY_{28}	Warrenastro	January 30, 2000	Catalina	CSS	·	2.7 km	MPC · JPL
75837 Johnbriol	2000 BC_{29}	Johnbriol	January 30, 2000	Catalina	CSS	·	3.7 km	MPC · JPL
75838	2000 BX_{29}	—	January 30, 2000	Socorro	LINEAR	·	3.1 km	MPC · JPL
75839	2000 BA_{30}	—	January 30, 2000	Socorro	LINEAR	(5)	2.9 km	MPC · JPL
75840	2000 BG_{30}	—	January 30, 2000	Socorro	LINEAR	NYS	4.4 km	MPC · JPL
75841 Brendahuettner	2000 BA_{32}	Brendahuettner	January 30, 2000	Catalina	CSS	(5)	2.3 km	MPC · JPL
75842 Jackmonahan	2000 BE_{32}	Jackmonahan	January 30, 2000	Catalina	CSS	·	3.1 km	MPC · JPL
75843	2000 BL_{32}	—	January 28, 2000	Kitt Peak	Spacewatch	·	3.7 km	MPC · JPL
75844 Rexadams	2000 BN_{33}	Rexadams	January 30, 2000	Catalina	CSS	AGN	2.5 km	MPC · JPL
75845	2000 BD_{34}	—	January 30, 2000	Kitt Peak	Spacewatch	(5)	1.9 km	MPC · JPL
75846 Jandorf	2000 BN_{34}	Jandorf	January 30, 2000	Catalina	CSS	AGN	2.4 km	MPC · JPL
75847	2000 BD_{35}	—	January 30, 2000	Socorro	LINEAR	·	3.8 km	MPC · JPL
75848	2000 BH_{35}	—	January 30, 2000	Socorro	LINEAR	·	3.2 km	MPC · JPL
75849	2000 BM_{46}	—	January 28, 2000	Kitt Peak	Spacewatch	·	4.2 km	MPC · JPL
75850	2000 CC	—	February 2, 2000	Tebbutt	F. B. Zoltowski	(5)	2.1 km	MPC · JPL
75851	2000 CF	—	February 1, 2000	Prescott	P. G. Comba	EOS	4.2 km	MPC · JPL
75852 Elgie	2000 CY	Elgie	February 1, 2000	Catalina	CSS	MAR	4.0 km	MPC · JPL
75853	2000 CC_{3}	—	February 2, 2000	Socorro	LINEAR	·	5.1 km	MPC · JPL
75854	2000 CZ_{4}	—	February 2, 2000	Socorro	LINEAR	·	3.7 km	MPC · JPL
75855	2000 CT_{5}	—	February 2, 2000	Socorro	LINEAR	·	3.7 km	MPC · JPL
75856	2000 CP_{8}	—	February 2, 2000	Socorro	LINEAR	·	2.4 km	MPC · JPL
75857	2000 CQ_{8}	—	February 2, 2000	Socorro	LINEAR	·	3.3 km	MPC · JPL
75858	2000 CJ_{9}	—	February 2, 2000	Socorro	LINEAR	EOS	3.5 km	MPC · JPL
75859	2000 CP_{10}	—	February 2, 2000	Socorro	LINEAR	slow	3.3 km	MPC · JPL
75860	2000 CH_{12}	—	February 2, 2000	Socorro	LINEAR	·	4.8 km	MPC · JPL
75861	2000 CG_{13}	—	February 2, 2000	Socorro	LINEAR	·	2.0 km	MPC · JPL
75862	2000 CJ_{17}	—	February 2, 2000	Socorro	LINEAR	·	5.1 km	MPC · JPL
75863	2000 CD_{18}	—	February 2, 2000	Socorro	LINEAR	MRX	2.3 km	MPC · JPL
75864	2000 CB_{19}	—	February 2, 2000	Socorro	LINEAR	·	2.3 km	MPC · JPL
75865	2000 CC_{19}	—	February 2, 2000	Socorro	LINEAR	·	3.8 km	MPC · JPL
75866	2000 CA_{20}	—	February 2, 2000	Socorro	LINEAR	·	3.9 km	MPC · JPL
75867	2000 CF_{20}	—	February 2, 2000	Socorro	LINEAR	·	3.2 km	MPC · JPL
75868	2000 CF_{21}	—	February 2, 2000	Socorro	LINEAR	·	3.5 km	MPC · JPL
75869	2000 CR_{21}	—	February 2, 2000	Socorro	LINEAR	·	2.3 km	MPC · JPL
75870	2000 CV_{21}	—	February 2, 2000	Socorro	LINEAR	·	3.0 km	MPC · JPL
75871	2000 CY_{23}	—	February 2, 2000	Socorro	LINEAR	EOS	4.9 km	MPC · JPL
75872	2000 CK_{24}	—	February 2, 2000	Socorro	LINEAR	EUN	5.4 km	MPC · JPL
75873	2000 CQ_{24}	—	February 2, 2000	Socorro	LINEAR	LEO	4.4 km	MPC · JPL
75874	2000 CE_{26}	—	February 2, 2000	Socorro	LINEAR	(5)	3.0 km	MPC · JPL
75875	2000 CQ_{26}	—	February 2, 2000	Socorro	LINEAR	·	2.9 km	MPC · JPL
75876	2000 CU_{27}	—	February 2, 2000	Socorro	LINEAR	·	2.1 km	MPC · JPL
75877	2000 CJ_{28}	—	February 2, 2000	Socorro	LINEAR	·	2.7 km	MPC · JPL
75878	2000 CM_{28}	—	February 2, 2000	Socorro	LINEAR	RAF	2.7 km	MPC · JPL
75879	2000 CL_{29}	—	February 2, 2000	Socorro	LINEAR	RAF	2.1 km	MPC · JPL
75880	2000 CP_{29}	—	February 2, 2000	Socorro	LINEAR	·	4.9 km	MPC · JPL
75881	2000 CC_{31}	—	February 2, 2000	Socorro	LINEAR	·	8.0 km	MPC · JPL
75882	2000 CC_{32}	—	February 2, 2000	Socorro	LINEAR	·	3.8 km	MPC · JPL
75883	2000 CR_{32}	—	February 2, 2000	Socorro	LINEAR	slow	5.2 km	MPC · JPL
75884	2000 CS_{32}	—	February 2, 2000	Socorro	LINEAR	·	5.5 km	MPC · JPL
75885	2000 CE_{33}	—	February 2, 2000	Socorro	LINEAR	NYS	2.2 km	MPC · JPL
75886	2000 CZ_{33}	—	February 4, 2000	Višnjan Observatory	K. Korlević	·	3.4 km	MPC · JPL
75887	2000 CS_{34}	—	February 4, 2000	San Marcello	M. Tombelli, L. Tesi	·	2.6 km	MPC · JPL
75888	2000 CU_{35}	—	February 2, 2000	Socorro	LINEAR	·	5.0 km	MPC · JPL
75889	2000 CV_{35}	—	February 2, 2000	Socorro	LINEAR	AGN	2.0 km	MPC · JPL
75890	2000 CM_{36}	—	February 2, 2000	Socorro	LINEAR	BRG	3.2 km	MPC · JPL
75891	2000 CY_{37}	—	February 3, 2000	Socorro	LINEAR	·	4.7 km	MPC · JPL
75892	2000 CD_{38}	—	February 3, 2000	Socorro	LINEAR	NYS	3.8 km	MPC · JPL
75893	2000 CO_{38}	—	February 3, 2000	Socorro	LINEAR	KOR	3.4 km	MPC · JPL
75894	2000 CZ_{38}	—	February 3, 2000	Socorro	LINEAR	·	2.3 km	MPC · JPL
75895	2000 CD_{44}	—	February 2, 2000	Socorro	LINEAR	·	6.3 km	MPC · JPL
75896	2000 CV_{44}	—	February 2, 2000	Socorro	LINEAR	·	2.1 km	MPC · JPL
75897	2000 CL_{45}	—	February 2, 2000	Socorro	LINEAR	·	8.8 km	MPC · JPL
75898	2000 CM_{45}	—	February 2, 2000	Socorro	LINEAR	EUN	2.8 km	MPC · JPL
75899	2000 CZ_{45}	—	February 2, 2000	Socorro	LINEAR	·	3.0 km	MPC · JPL
75900	2000 CC_{48}	—	February 2, 2000	Socorro	LINEAR	·	2.7 km	MPC · JPL

== 75901–76000 ==
back to top

Designation			Discovery			Properties		Ref
Permanent	Provisional	Named after	Date	Site	Discoverer(s)	Category	Diam.	Ref
75901	2000 CB_{49}	—	February 2, 2000	Socorro	LINEAR	·	2.7 km	MPC · JPL
75902	2000 CN_{49}	—	February 2, 2000	Socorro	LINEAR	MRX	3.4 km	MPC · JPL
75903	2000 CQ_{49}	—	February 2, 2000	Socorro	LINEAR	slow	6.9 km	MPC · JPL
75904	2000 CA_{50}	—	February 2, 2000	Socorro	LINEAR	·	5.4 km	MPC · JPL
75905	2000 CK_{50}	—	February 2, 2000	Socorro	LINEAR	·	5.7 km	MPC · JPL
75906	2000 CY_{50}	—	February 2, 2000	Socorro	LINEAR	·	3.6 km	MPC · JPL
75907	2000 CJ_{51}	—	February 2, 2000	Socorro	LINEAR	EUN	3.8 km	MPC · JPL
75908	2000 CC_{53}	—	February 2, 2000	Socorro	LINEAR	EUN	3.0 km	MPC · JPL
75909	2000 CG_{53}	—	February 2, 2000	Socorro	LINEAR	·	2.7 km	MPC · JPL
75910	2000 CO_{53}	—	February 2, 2000	Socorro	LINEAR	fast	11 km	MPC · JPL
75911	2000 CJ_{54}	—	February 2, 2000	Socorro	LINEAR	·	2.0 km	MPC · JPL
75912	2000 CQ_{56}	—	February 4, 2000	Socorro	LINEAR	GEF	2.0 km	MPC · JPL
75913	2000 CU_{57}	—	February 5, 2000	Socorro	LINEAR	·	3.0 km	MPC · JPL
75914	2000 CS_{58}	—	February 2, 2000	Socorro	LINEAR	BAR	3.0 km	MPC · JPL
75915	2000 CO_{60}	—	February 2, 2000	Socorro	LINEAR	KOR	3.2 km	MPC · JPL
75916	2000 CY_{60}	—	February 2, 2000	Socorro	LINEAR	MAR	2.6 km	MPC · JPL
75917	2000 CZ_{60}	—	February 2, 2000	Socorro	LINEAR	·	2.6 km	MPC · JPL
75918	2000 CC_{61}	—	February 2, 2000	Socorro	LINEAR	·	9.7 km	MPC · JPL
75919	2000 CK_{61}	—	February 2, 2000	Socorro	LINEAR	·	9.7 km	MPC · JPL
75920	2000 CR_{62}	—	February 2, 2000	Socorro	LINEAR	·	3.1 km	MPC · JPL
75921	2000 CL_{63}	—	February 2, 2000	Socorro	LINEAR	·	3.4 km	MPC · JPL
75922	2000 CQ_{64}	—	February 3, 2000	Socorro	LINEAR	·	4.3 km	MPC · JPL
75923	2000 CL_{65}	—	February 4, 2000	Socorro	LINEAR	·	3.5 km	MPC · JPL
75924	2000 CF_{66}	—	February 6, 2000	Socorro	LINEAR	EUN	3.0 km	MPC · JPL
75925	2000 CJ_{66}	—	February 6, 2000	Socorro	LINEAR	EOS	4.3 km	MPC · JPL
75926	2000 CR_{66}	—	February 6, 2000	Socorro	LINEAR	·	1.9 km	MPC · JPL
75927	2000 CE_{67}	—	February 6, 2000	Socorro	LINEAR	BRA	3.1 km	MPC · JPL
75928	2000 CY_{69}	—	February 1, 2000	Kitt Peak	Spacewatch	·	3.3 km	MPC · JPL
75929	2000 CH_{70}	—	February 7, 2000	Socorro	LINEAR	·	3.8 km	MPC · JPL
75930	2000 CO_{70}	—	February 7, 2000	Socorro	LINEAR	·	4.0 km	MPC · JPL
75931	2000 CG_{71}	—	February 7, 2000	Socorro	LINEAR	MAR	3.5 km	MPC · JPL
75932	2000 CN_{71}	—	February 7, 2000	Socorro	LINEAR	·	7.0 km	MPC · JPL
75933	2000 CB_{75}	—	February 6, 2000	Socorro	LINEAR	·	4.0 km	MPC · JPL
75934	2000 CR_{75}	—	February 7, 2000	Socorro	LINEAR	·	4.0 km	MPC · JPL
75935	2000 CW_{75}	—	February 7, 2000	Socorro	LINEAR	·	3.4 km	MPC · JPL
75936	2000 CZ_{75}	—	February 8, 2000	Socorro	LINEAR	·	4.6 km	MPC · JPL
75937	2000 CK_{78}	—	February 7, 2000	Kitt Peak	Spacewatch	·	3.5 km	MPC · JPL
75938	2000 CO_{80}	—	February 6, 2000	Socorro	LINEAR	·	5.7 km	MPC · JPL
75939	2000 CF_{81}	—	February 4, 2000	Socorro	LINEAR	·	7.1 km	MPC · JPL
75940	2000 CL_{82}	—	February 4, 2000	Socorro	LINEAR	KOR	2.7 km	MPC · JPL
75941	2000 CX_{82}	—	February 4, 2000	Socorro	LINEAR	MIS	6.2 km	MPC · JPL
75942	2000 CO_{84}	—	February 4, 2000	Socorro	LINEAR	·	3.9 km	MPC · JPL
75943	2000 CM_{85}	—	February 4, 2000	Socorro	LINEAR	·	3.3 km	MPC · JPL
75944	2000 CT_{85}	—	February 4, 2000	Socorro	LINEAR	·	2.7 km	MPC · JPL
75945	2000 CY_{86}	—	February 4, 2000	Socorro	LINEAR	·	3.9 km	MPC · JPL
75946	2000 CZ_{86}	—	February 4, 2000	Socorro	LINEAR	MAR	3.1 km	MPC · JPL
75947	2000 CB_{87}	—	February 4, 2000	Socorro	LINEAR	·	6.2 km	MPC · JPL
75948	2000 CH_{88}	—	February 4, 2000	Socorro	LINEAR	·	5.3 km	MPC · JPL
75949	2000 CR_{88}	—	February 4, 2000	Socorro	LINEAR	·	7.0 km	MPC · JPL
75950	2000 CU_{88}	—	February 4, 2000	Socorro	LINEAR	·	2.6 km	MPC · JPL
75951	2000 CK_{90}	—	February 6, 2000	Socorro	LINEAR	·	5.8 km	MPC · JPL
75952	2000 CD_{91}	—	February 6, 2000	Socorro	LINEAR	·	3.5 km	MPC · JPL
75953	2000 CE_{91}	—	February 6, 2000	Socorro	LINEAR	·	4.1 km	MPC · JPL
75954	2000 CO_{91}	—	February 6, 2000	Socorro	LINEAR	EUN ·	3.5 km	MPC · JPL
75955	2000 CC_{92}	—	February 6, 2000	Socorro	LINEAR	·	5.8 km	MPC · JPL
75956	2000 CZ_{92}	—	February 6, 2000	Socorro	LINEAR	·	2.9 km	MPC · JPL
75957	2000 CB_{94}	—	February 8, 2000	Socorro	LINEAR	ADE	6.1 km	MPC · JPL
75958	2000 CE_{94}	—	February 8, 2000	Socorro	LINEAR	·	4.7 km	MPC · JPL
75959	2000 CP_{94}	—	February 8, 2000	Socorro	LINEAR	EUN	3.0 km	MPC · JPL
75960	2000 CS_{96}	—	February 6, 2000	Socorro	LINEAR	·	4.4 km	MPC · JPL
75961	2000 CZ_{98}	—	February 8, 2000	Kitt Peak	Spacewatch	·	7.1 km	MPC · JPL
75962	2000 CH_{100}	—	February 10, 2000	Kitt Peak	Spacewatch	·	2.7 km	MPC · JPL
75963	2000 CN_{100}	—	February 10, 2000	Kitt Peak	Spacewatch	·	3.6 km	MPC · JPL
75964	2000 CQ_{100}	—	February 10, 2000	Kitt Peak	Spacewatch	·	4.0 km	MPC · JPL
75965	2000 CF_{103}	—	February 6, 2000	Socorro	LINEAR	·	4.9 km	MPC · JPL
75966	2000 CL_{103}	—	February 7, 2000	Socorro	LINEAR	·	2.8 km	MPC · JPL
75967	2000 CP_{103}	—	February 8, 2000	Socorro	LINEAR	·	3.9 km	MPC · JPL
75968	2000 CF_{104}	—	February 10, 2000	Višnjan Observatory	K. Korlević	THM	7.4 km	MPC · JPL
75969 Backhouse	2000 CE_{112}	Backhouse	February 7, 2000	Catalina	CSS	·	6.1 km	MPC · JPL
75970 Olcott	2000 CH_{112}	Olcott	February 7, 2000	Catalina	CSS	·	2.9 km	MPC · JPL
75971 Unkingalls	2000 CK_{112}	Unkingalls	February 7, 2000	Catalina	CSS	·	4.4 km	MPC · JPL
75972 Huddleston	2000 CM_{112}	Huddleston	February 7, 2000	Catalina	CSS	·	6.7 km	MPC · JPL
75973	2000 CA_{117}	—	February 3, 2000	Socorro	LINEAR	·	3.3 km	MPC · JPL
75974	2000 CC_{117}	—	February 4, 2000	Socorro	LINEAR	AST	6.1 km	MPC · JPL
75975	2000 CD_{121}	—	February 2, 2000	Socorro	LINEAR	·	3.8 km	MPC · JPL
75976	2000 CZ_{121}	—	February 3, 2000	Socorro	LINEAR	·	6.4 km	MPC · JPL
75977	2000 CK_{122}	—	February 3, 2000	Socorro	LINEAR	·	3.6 km	MPC · JPL
75978	2000 CC_{124}	—	February 3, 2000	Socorro	LINEAR	·	4.7 km	MPC · JPL
75979	2000 CL_{125}	—	February 3, 2000	Socorro	LINEAR	KOR	3.7 km	MPC · JPL
75980	2000 CK_{128}	—	February 2, 2000	Kitt Peak	Spacewatch	HYG	5.0 km	MPC · JPL
75981	2000 CH_{136}	—	February 3, 2000	Kitt Peak	Spacewatch	·	3.1 km	MPC · JPL
75982	2000 DU	—	February 24, 2000	Oizumi	T. Kobayashi	EOS	5.0 km	MPC · JPL
75983	2000 DY	—	February 24, 2000	Oizumi	T. Kobayashi	·	6.6 km	MPC · JPL
75984	2000 DC_{2}	—	February 26, 2000	Kitt Peak	Spacewatch	·	3.2 km	MPC · JPL
75985	2000 DY_{2}	—	February 24, 2000	Oizumi	T. Kobayashi	EOS	4.7 km	MPC · JPL
75986	2000 DO_{3}	—	February 28, 2000	Višnjan Observatory	K. Korlević, M. Jurić	·	4.1 km	MPC · JPL
75987	2000 DW_{4}	—	February 28, 2000	Socorro	LINEAR	·	2.6 km	MPC · JPL
75988	2000 DK_{6}	—	February 28, 2000	Socorro	LINEAR	·	3.6 km	MPC · JPL
75989	2000 DF_{7}	—	February 29, 2000	Oizumi	T. Kobayashi	EOS	5.8 km	MPC · JPL
75990	2000 DA_{9}	—	February 26, 2000	Kitt Peak	Spacewatch	WIT	2.1 km	MPC · JPL
75991	2000 DE_{9}	—	February 26, 2000	Kitt Peak	Spacewatch	·	5.1 km	MPC · JPL
75992	2000 DH_{9}	—	February 26, 2000	Kitt Peak	Spacewatch	EUN	2.3 km	MPC · JPL
75993	2000 DR_{9}	—	February 26, 2000	Kitt Peak	Spacewatch	·	2.7 km	MPC · JPL
75994	2000 DA_{12}	—	February 27, 2000	Kitt Peak	Spacewatch	·	6.8 km	MPC · JPL
75995	2000 DD_{14}	—	February 28, 2000	Kitt Peak	Spacewatch	·	2.1 km	MPC · JPL
75996 Piekiel	2000 DS_{14}	Piekiel	February 26, 2000	Catalina	CSS	·	3.7 km	MPC · JPL
75997	2000 DU_{14}	—	February 26, 2000	Catalina	CSS	·	3.1 km	MPC · JPL
75998	2000 DE_{15}	—	February 26, 2000	Catalina	CSS	·	4.3 km	MPC · JPL
75999	2000 DH_{15}	—	February 26, 2000	Catalina	CSS	(5)	7.2 km	MPC · JPL
76000 Juliuserving	2000 DO_{15}	Juliuserving	February 26, 2000	Catalina	CSS	·	3.9 km	MPC · JPL

back to top

== See also ==
- Meanings of minor-planet names: 75001–76000
