= Toru Kobayashi =

Japanese astronomer

Tōru Kobayashi (小林 徹, Kobayashi Tōru) is/was a Japanese astronomer.

He was active in the 1970s, working at Imadate in Fukui Prefecture, Japan.

He co-discovered Comet C/1975 N1 (Kobayashi-Berger-Milon).

He should not be confused with another Japanese astronomer, Takao Kobayashi, who discovered the periodic comet P/1997 B1 (Kobayashi), as well as more than 2000 asteroids.
