= Takao Kobayashi =

Japanese amateur astronomer (born 1961)

Minor planets discovered: 2479
see § List of discovered minor planets

Takao Kobayashi (小林 隆男, Kobayashi Takao; born 1961) is a Japanese amateur astronomer and a discoverer of minor planets who currently works at the Ōizumi Observatory. The asteroid 3500 Kobayashi is named after him.

== Career ==
Kobayashi has discovered more than 2000 asteroids using CCD technology, including the Amor asteroids 7358 Oze, (23714) 1998 EC_{3}, (48603) 1995 BC_{2} and about nine Trojan asteroids. He also discovered the periodic comet P/1997 B1 (Kobayashi), which he originally reported as an asteroid.

His asteroid discoveries of January 16, 1994 and December 31, 1994, have been named 8883 Miyazakihayao and 10160 Totoro by Kobayashi. The names reference anime filmmaker Hayao Miyazaki, and one of his creations, My Neighbor Totoro. The names were approved by the International Astronomical Union. Kobayashi is not to be confused with another Japanese astronomer, Toru Kobayashi, who co-discovered comet C/1975 N1 (Kobayashi-Berger-Milon).

=== P/1997 B1 (Kobayashi) ===
On January 30 and January 31, 1997, Kobayashi observed an object, P/1997 B1 (Kobayashi), which was initially thought to be a minor planet and was reported to the IAU as such by Syuichi Nakano. Over the next few days, the object was observed to be in a cometary orbit. Warren B. Offutt later showed it to be a comet.

== List of discovered minor planets ==
4807 Noboru	10 January 1991	list
5924 Teruo	7 February 1994	list
6275 Kiryu	14 November 1993	list
6276 Kurohone	1 January 1994	list
6346 Syukumeguri	6 January 1995	list
6414 Mizunuma	24 October 1993	list
6418 Hanamigahara	8 December 1993	list
6420 Riheijyaya	14 December 1993	list
6422 Akagi	7 February 1994	list
6423 Harunasan	13 February 1994	list
6462 Myougi	9 January 1994	list
6531 Subashiri	28 December 1994	list
6663 Tatebayashi	12 February 1993	list
6664 Tennyo	14 February 1993	list
6747 Ozegahara	20 October 1995	list
6839 Ozenuma	18 November 1995	list
6881 Shifutsu	31 October 1994	list
6883 Hiuchigatake	10 January 1996	list
6932 Tanigawadake	24 December 1994	list
6933 Azumayasan	28 December 1994	list
6983 Komatsusakyo	17 December 1993	list
6986 Asamayama	24 November 1994	list
6987 Onioshidashi	25 November 1994	list
6989 Hoshinosato	6 December 1994	list
6990 Toya	9 December 1994	list
6991 Chichibu	6 January 1995	list
6992 Minano-machi	27 January 1995	list
6995 Minoyama	24 January 1996	list
7027 Toshihanda	11 December 1993	list
7134 Ikeuchisatoru	24 October 1993	list
7140 Osaki	4 March 1994	list
7195 Danboice	2 January 1994	list
7205 Sadanori	21 December 1995	list
7257 Yoshiya	7 January 1994	list
7261 Yokootakeo	14 April 1994	list
7262 Sofue	27 January 1995	list
7263 Takayamada	21 February 1995	list
7304 Namiki	9 January 1994	list
7309 Shinkawakami	28 March 1995	list
7351 Yoshidamichi	12 December 1993	list
7354 Ishiguro	27 January 1995	list
7358 Oze	27 December 1995	list
7366 Agata	20 October 1996	list
7434 Osaka	14 January 1994	list
7439 Tetsufuse	6 December 1994	list
7443 Tsumura	26 January 1996	list
7486 Hamabe	6 December 1994	list
7487 Toshitanaka	28 December 1994	list
7504 Kawakita	2 January 1997	list
7505 Furusho	3 January 1997	list

7538 Zenbei	15 November 1996	list
7602 Yidaeam	31 December 1994	list
7611 Hashitatsu	23 January 1996	list
7614 Masatomi	2 March 1996	list
7616 Sadako	6 November 1996	list
7618 Gotoyukichi	6 January 1997	list
7668 Mizunotakao	31 January 1995	list
7673 Inohara	20 October 1995	list
7677 Sawa	27 December 1995	list
7682 Miura	12 February 1997	list
7710 Ishibashi	30 November 1994	list
7713 Tsutomu	17 December 1995	list
7717 Tabeisshi	7 January 1997	list
7797 Morita	26 January 1996	list
7802 Takiguchi	2 December 1996	list
7803 Adachi	4 March 1997	list
7844 Horikawa	21 December 1995	list
7845 Mckim	1 January 1996	list
7894 Rogers	6 December 1994	list
7898 Ohkuma	15 December 1995	list
7899 Joya	30 January 1996	list
7901 Konnai	19 February 1996	list
7956 Yaji	17 December 1993	list
7966 Richardbaum	18 February 1996	list
8043 Fukuhara	6 December 1994	list
8044 Tsuchiyama	28 December 1994	list
8045 Kamiyama	6 January 1995	list
8046 Ajiki	25 January 1995	list
8047 Akikinoshita	31 January 1995	list
8101 Yasue	15 December 1993	list
8102 Yoshikazu	14 January 1994	list
8104 Kumamori	19 January 1994	list
8110 Heath	27 February 1995	list
8197 Mizunohiroshi	15 November 1993	list
8199 Takagitakeo	9 December 1993	list
8206 Masayuki	27 November 1994	list
8207 Suminao	31 December 1994	list
8210 NANTEN	5 March 1995	list
8232 Akiramizuno	26 October 1997	list
8233 Asada	5 November 1997	list
8300 Iga	9 January 1994	list
8301 Haseyuji	30 January 1995	list
8302 Kazukin	3 February 1995	list
8303 Miyaji	9 February 1995	list
8304 Ryomichico	22 February 1995	list
8305 Teika	22 February 1995	list
8399 Wakamatsu	2 January 1994	list
8400 Tomizo	4 January 1994	list
8403 Minorushimizu	6 May 1994	list
8424 Toshitsumita	1 February 1997	list

8431 Haseda	31 December 1997	list
8543 Tsunemi	15 December 1993	list
8544 Sigenori	17 December 1993	list
8571 Taniguchi	20 October 1996	list
8574 Makotoirie	6 November 1996	list
8578 Shojikato	19 November 1996	list
8579 Hieizan	11 December 1996	list
8582 Kazuhisa	2 January 1997	list
8703 Nakanotadao	15 December 1993	list
8704 Sadakane	17 December 1993	list
8706 Takeyama	3 February 1994	list
8707 Arakihiroshi	12 February 1994	list
8726 Masamotonasu	14 November 1996	list
8731 Tejima	19 November 1996	list
8733 Ohsugi	20 December 1996	list
8735 Yoshiosakai	2 January 1997	list
8736 Shigehisa	9 January 1997	list
8737 Takehiro	11 January 1997	list
8739 Morihisa	30 January 1997	list
8741 Suzukisuzuko	25 January 1998	list
8883 Miyazakihayao	16 January 1994	list
(8901) 1995 UJ_{4}	20 October 1995	list
(8902) 1995 UK_{4}	20 October 1995	list
8904 Yoshihara	15 November 1995	list
8905 Bankakuko	16 November 1995	list
8906 Yano	18 November 1995	list
8907 Takaji	24 November 1995	list
8909 Ohnishitaka	27 November 1995	list
8911 Kawaguchijun	17 December 1995	list
8912 Ohshimatake	21 December 1995	list
8915 Sawaishujiro	27 December 1995	list
8923 Yamakawa	30 November 1996	list
8926 Abemasanao	20 December 1996	list
8927 Ryojiro	20 December 1996	list
8929 Haginoshinji	29 December 1996	list
8930 Kubota	6 January 1997	list
8931 Hirokimatsuo	6 January 1997	list
8932 Nagatomo	6 January 1997	list
8934 Nishimurajun	10 January 1997	list
8939 Onodajunjiro	29 January 1997	list
8940 Yakushimaru	29 January 1997	list
8941 Junsaito	30 January 1997	list
8942 Takagi	30 January 1997	list
8946 Yoshimitsu	1 February 1997	list
8947 Mizutani	14 February 1997	list
9073 Yoshinori	4 March 1994	list
9091 Ishidatakaki	2 November 1995	list
9093 Sorada	16 November 1995	list
9094 Butsuen	16 November 1995	list
9096 Tamotsu	15 December 1995	list

9098 Toshihiko	27 January 1996	list
9099 Kenjitanabe	6 November 1996	list
9100 Tomohisa	2 December 1996	list
9103 Komatsubara	14 December 1996	list
9104 Matsuo	20 December 1996	list
9105 Matsumura	2 January 1997	list
9106 Yatagarasu	3 January 1997	list
9107 Narukospa	6 January 1997	list
9108 Toruyusa	9 January 1997	list
9109 Yukomotizuki	9 January 1997	list
9112 Hatsulars	31 January 1997	list
9114 Hatakeyama	12 February 1997	list
9212 Kanamaru	20 October 1995	list
9217 Kitagawa	16 November 1995	list
9218 Ishiikazuo	20 November 1995	list
9220 Yoshidayama	15 December 1995	list
9222 Chubey	19 December 1995	list
9225 Daiki	10 January 1996	list
9226 Arimahiroshi	12 January 1996	list
9227 Ashida	26 January 1996	list
9228 Nakahiroshi	11 February 1996	list
9231 Shimaken	29 January 1997	list
9233 Itagijun	1 February 1997	list
9234 Matsumototaku	3 February 1997	list
9388 Takeno	10 March 1994	list
9396 Yamaneakisato	17 August 1994	list
9405 Johnratje	27 November 1994	list
9408 Haseakira	20 January 1995	list
9411 Hitomiyamoto	1 February 1995	list
9414 Masamimurakami	25 October 1995	list
9415 Yujiokimura	1 November 1995	list
9416 Miyahara	17 November 1995	list
9417 Jujiishii	17 November 1995	list
9419 Keikochaki	12 December 1995	list
9422 Kuboniwa	13 January 1996	list
9424 Hiroshinishiyama	16 January 1996	list
9432 Iba	1 February 1997	list
9434 Bokusen	12 February 1997	list
9435 Odafukashi	12 February 1997	list
9436 Shudo	1 March 1997	list
9437 Hironari	4 March 1997	list
9450 Akikoizumo	19 January 1998	list
(9646) 1995 BV	25 January 1995	list
(9647) 1995 UM_{8}	27 October 1995	list
9649 Junfukue	2 December 1995	list
9650 Okadaira	17 December 1995	list
9654 Seitennokai	13 January 1996	list
9655 Yaburanger	11 February 1996	list
9656 Kurokawahiroki	23 February 1996	list
9782 Edo	25 November 1994	list

9783 Tensho-kan	28 December 1994	list
9784 Yotsubashi	31 December 1994	list
9785 Senjikan	31 December 1994	list
9786 Gakutensoku	19 January 1995	list
9788 Yagami	11 March 1995	list
9791 Kamiyakurai	21 December 1995	list
9792 Nonodakesan	23 January 1996	list
9800 Shigetoshi	4 March 1997	list
9807 Rhene	27 September 1997	list
9887 Ashikaga	2 January 1995	list
(9888) 1995 CD	1 February 1995	list
9891 Stephensmith	15 December 1995	list
9892 Meigetsuki	27 December 1995	list
9893 Sagano	12 January 1996	list
(9894) 1996 BS_{1}	23 January 1996	list
(9895) 1996 BR_{3}	27 January 1996	list
9898 Yoshiro	18 February 1996	list
9977 Kentakunimoto	2 January 1994	list
(9978) 1994 AJ_{1}	7 January 1994	list
(9979) 1994 VT	3 November 1994	list
(9980) 1995 BQ_{3}	31 January 1995	list
9981 Kudo	31 January 1995	list
(9982) 1995 CH	1 February 1995	list
10147 Mizugatsuka	13 February 1994	list
10154 Tanuki	31 October 1994	list
10157 Asagiri	27 November 1994	list
10158 Taroubou	3 December 1994	list
10159 Tokara	9 December 1994	list
10160 Totoro	31 December 1994	list
10161 Nakanoshima	31 December 1994	list
10164 Akusekijima	27 January 1995	list
10166 Takarajima	30 January 1995	list
10169 Ogasawara	21 February 1995	list
10178 Iriki	18 February 1996	list
10179 Ishigaki	18 February 1996	list
10226 Seishika	8 November 1997	list
10364 Tainai	3 November 1994	list
10365 Kurokawa	27 November 1994	list
10367 Sayo	31 December 1994	list
10368 Kozuki	7 February 1995	list
10399 Nishiharima	29 October 1997	list
10400 Hakkaisan	1 November 1997	list
10401 Masakoba	6 November 1997	list
(10402) 1997 VS_{5}	8 November 1997	list
(10419) 1998 XB_{4}	11 December 1998	list
(10420) 1998 YB_{12}	27 December 1998	list
(10574) 1994 YH_{1}	31 December 1994	list
(10575) 1994 YV_{1}	31 December 1994	list
(10576) 1995 GF	3 April 1995	list
(10610) 1996 XR_{1}	2 December 1996	list

(10615) 1997 UK_{3}	26 October 1997	list
(10618) 1997 VU_{3}	6 November 1997	list
(10621) 1997 XN	3 December 1997	list
(10623) 1997 YP_{7}	27 December 1997	list
(10624) 1997 YR_{13}	31 December 1997	list
(10644) 1999 DM_{2}	19 February 1999	list
10832 Hazamashigetomi	15 November 1993	list
(10836) 1994 CS_{2}	14 February 1994	list
(10844) 1995 AG	2 January 1995	list
(10845) 1995 AA_{1}	6 January 1995	list
(10848) 1995 BD_{1}	25 January 1995	list
(10851) 1995 CE	1 February 1995	list
(10852) 1995 CK	1 February 1995	list
(10854) 1995 DO_{1}	22 February 1995	list
(10855) 1995 DR_{1}	26 February 1995	list
(10858) 1995 FT	28 March 1995	list
(10876) 1996 UB	16 October 1996	list
(10879) 1996 VM_{3}	6 November 1996	list
(10883) 1996 VU_{5}	14 November 1996	list
(10889) 1997 AO_{1}	2 January 1997	list
(10890) 1997 AY_{2}	4 January 1997	list
(10897) 1997 VW_{3}	7 November 1997	list
(10898) 1997 WJ_{2}	23 November 1997	list
10900 Folkner	30 November 1997	list
(10901) 1997 WS_{21}	30 November 1997	list
(10910) 1997 YX	20 December 1997	list
(10912) 1997 YW_{5}	25 December 1997	list
(10913) 1997 YE_{14}	31 December 1997	list
(10917) 1998 AN	5 January 1998	list
(10920) 1998 BC_{1}	19 January 1998	list
(10935) 1998 EC	1 March 1998	list
11092 Iwakisan	4 March 1994	list
11107 Hakkoda	25 October 1995	list
11108 Hachimantai	27 October 1995	list
11109 Iwatesan	27 October 1995	list
11111 Repunit	16 November 1995	list
11129 Hayachine	14 November 1996	list
11133 Kumotori	2 December 1996	list
11135 Ryokami	3 December 1996	list
11137 Yarigatake	8 December 1996	list
11138 Hotakadake	14 December 1996	list
11140 Yakedake	2 January 1997	list
11146 Kirigamine	23 November 1997	list
11149 Tateshina	5 December 1997	list
11151 Oodaigahara	24 December 1997	list
11152 Oomine	25 December 1997	list
11154 Kobushi	28 December 1997	list
11155 Kinpu	31 December 1997	list
11159 Mizugaki	19 January 1998	list
11161 Daibosatsu	25 January 1998	list

(11162) 1998 BG_{8}	25 January 1998	list
(11312) 1994 AR_{2}	14 January 1994	list
(11318) 1994 XZ_{4}	4 December 1994	list
(11319) 1995 AZ	6 January 1995	list
(11320) 1995 BY	25 January 1995	list
(11329) 1995 WJ_{2}	18 November 1995	list
(11342) 1996 XJ_{19}	8 December 1996	list
(11343) 1996 XP_{19}	8 December 1996	list
(11344) 1996 XH_{31}	14 December 1996	list
(11345) 1996 YM	20 December 1996	list
(11346) 1997 AP_{14}	10 January 1997	list
(11354) 1997 XY_{9}	5 December 1997	list
(11357) 1997 YX_{2}	21 December 1997	list
(11358) 1997 YY_{5}	25 December 1997	list
(11389) 1998 VV_{5}	11 November 1998	list
(11399) 1999 AR_{3}	10 January 1999	list
(11402) 1999 BD	16 January 1999	list
(11576) 1994 CL	3 February 1994	list
(11589) 1994 WG	25 November 1994	list
(11591) 1995 FV	28 March 1995	list
(11609) 1995 XT	12 December 1995	list
(11610) 1995 XJ_{1}	15 December 1995	list
(11616) 1996 BQ_{2}	26 January 1996	list
(11624) 1996 UF	16 October 1996	list
(11627) 1996 VT_{4}	13 November 1996	list
(11631) 1996 XV_{1}	2 December 1996	list
(11632) 1996 XB_{3}	3 December 1996	list
(11638) 1997 AH	2 January 1997	list
(11639) 1997 AO_{4}	6 January 1997	list
(11640) 1997 AT_{4}	6 January 1997	list
(11644) 1997 BR_{1}	29 January 1997	list
(11645) 1997 BY_{1}	29 January 1997	list
(11646) 1997 BZ_{1}	29 January 1997	list
(11647) 1997 BN_{3}	31 January 1997	list
(11648) 1997 BT_{3}	31 January 1997	list
(11650) 1997 CN	1 February 1997	list
(11651) 1997 CY	1 February 1997	list
(11653) 1997 CA_{20}	12 February 1997	list
(11654) 1997 CD_{20}	12 February 1997	list
(11674) 1998 BN_{25}	28 January 1998	list
(11741) 1999 AZ_{3}	10 January 1999	list
(11953) 1994 BW	19 January 1994	list
(11957) 1994 DS	17 February 1994	list
(11960) 1994 HA	17 April 1994	list
(11962) 1994 PX	14 August 1994	list
(11972) 1994 VK	1 November 1994	list
(11973) 1994 VN	1 November 1994	list
11974 Yasuhidefujita	24 December 1994	list
(11983) 1995 UH_{6}	27 October 1995	list
(11985) 1995 VG	1 November 1995	list

(11986) 1995 VP	3 November 1995	list
(11988) 1995 WB	16 November 1995	list
(11989) 1995 WN_{5}	24 November 1995	list
(11991) 1995 WK_{7}	27 November 1995	list
(11992) 1995 XH	2 December 1995	list
(11994) 1995 YP	19 December 1995	list
(11995) 1995 YB_{1}	21 December 1995	list
(11996) 1995 YC_{1}	21 December 1995	list
(11999) 1996 BV_{1}	23 January 1996	list
(12009) 1996 UE	16 October 1996	list
(12011) 1996 VT_{5}	14 November 1996	list
(12015) 1996 WA	16 November 1996	list
(12017) 1996 XC_{1}	2 December 1996	list
(12019) 1996 XF_{19}	8 December 1996	list
(12020) 1996 XW_{19}	11 December 1996	list
(12021) 1996 XX_{19}	12 December 1996	list
(12023) 1996 YJ	20 December 1996	list
(12024) 1996 YN_{2}	28 December 1996	list
(12025) 1997 AJ_{1}	2 January 1997	list
(12026) 1997 AV_{1}	3 January 1997	list
12028 Annekinney	9 January 1997	list
(12030) 1997 BF_{3}	30 January 1997	list
(12034) 1997 CR	1 February 1997	list
(12036) 1997 CR_{19}	11 February 1997	list
(12038) 1997 CE_{20}	12 February 1997	list
(12039) 1997 CB_{22}	13 February 1997	list
(12055) 1997 YR_{11}	30 December 1997	list
12056 Yoshigeru	30 December 1997	list
(12063) 1998 FH_{11}	22 March 1998	list
12364 Asadagouryu	15 December 1993	list
12365 Yoshitoki	17 December 1993	list
12372 Kagesuke	6 May 1994	list
(12385) 1994 UO	31 October 1994	list
(12389) 1994 WU	25 November 1994	list
(12390) 1994 WB_{1}	27 November 1994	list
(12392) 1994 WR_{2}	30 November 1994	list
(12393) 1994 YC_{1}	28 December 1994	list
(12394) 1995 BQ	23 January 1995	list
(12403) 1995 QD_{3}	31 August 1995	list
(12416) 1995 TS	2 October 1995	list
(12419) 1995 UP_{4}	25 October 1995	list
(12420) 1995 UT_{4}	25 October 1995	list
(12424) 1995 VM	2 November 1995	list
(12428) 1995 WJ_{5}	24 November 1995	list
(12429) 1995 WH_{7}	26 November 1995	list
(12434) 1996 BM	16 January 1996	list
(12436) 1996 BY_{1}	24 January 1996	list
(12441) 1996 DV	19 February 1996	list
(12449) 1996 XL_{31}	14 December 1996	list
(12450) 1996 YD	20 December 1996	list

(12451) 1996 YF	20 December 1996	list
(12452) 1996 YO	20 December 1996	list
(12453) 1996 YY	20 December 1996	list
(12455) 1997 AR	2 January 1997	list
(12457) 1997 AK_{1}	2 January 1997	list
(12458) 1997 AR_{1}	2 January 1997	list
(12459) 1997 AQ_{4}	6 January 1997	list
(12461) 1997 AM_{5}	7 January 1997	list
(12462) 1997 AO_{5}	7 January 1997	list
(12463) 1997 AL_{7}	9 January 1997	list
(12466) 1997 AS_{12}	10 January 1997	list
(12467) 1997 AX_{17}	15 January 1997	list
(12474) 1997 CZ_{19}	12 February 1997	list
(12475) 1997 CC_{20}	12 February 1997	list
(12476) 1997 EU_{2}	4 March 1997	list
(12767) 1994 AS	4 January 1994	list
(12768) 1994 EQ_{1}	10 March 1994	list
(12770) 1994 GF	3 April 1994	list
(12772) 1994 GM_{1}	14 April 1994	list
(12778) 1994 VJ_{1}	4 November 1994	list
(12779) 1994 YA_{1}	28 December 1994	list
(12783) 1995 GV	7 April 1995	list
(12784) 1995 QE_{3}	31 August 1995	list
(12791) 1995 UN_{4}	20 October 1995	list
(12792) 1995 UL_{6}	27 October 1995	list
(12794) 1995 VL	2 November 1995	list
(12797) 1995 WL_{4}	20 November 1995	list
(12798) 1995 WZ_{4}	24 November 1995	list
12800 Oobayashiarata	27 November 1995	list
12801 Somekawa	2 December 1995	list
12802 Hagino	15 December 1995	list
(12803) 1995 YF	17 December 1995	list
(12804) 1995 YJ_{3}	27 December 1995	list
(12806) 1996 AN	11 January 1996	list
(12807) 1996 AW	11 January 1996	list
(12808) 1996 AF_{1}	12 January 1996	list
(12809) 1996 BB	16 January 1996	list
(12815) 1996 DL_{2}	23 February 1996	list
(12822) 1996 XD_{1}	2 December 1996	list
12823 Pochintesta	2 January 1997	list
(12824) 1997 AW_{3}	6 January 1997	list
(12825) 1997 AJ_{7}	9 January 1997	list
(12826) 1997 AO_{7}	9 January 1997	list
(12829) 1997 AB_{13}	10 January 1997	list
(12830) 1997 BP_{1}	29 January 1997	list
(12832) 1997 CE_{1}	1 February 1997	list
(12836) 1997 CA_{22}	13 February 1997	list
(13124) 1994 PS	14 August 1994	list
(13134) 1994 QR	16 August 1994	list
(13138) 1994 VA	1 November 1994	list

(13141) 1994 WW_{2}	30 November 1994	list
(13143) 1995 AF	2 January 1995	list
(13144) 1995 BJ	23 January 1995	list
(13153) 1995 QC_{3}	31 August 1995	list
(13159) 1995 UW_{3}	20 October 1995	list
(13160) 1995 US_{4}	25 October 1995	list
(13161) 1995 UK_{6}	27 October 1995	list
(13164) 1995 VF	1 November 1995	list
(13167) 1995 WC_{5}	24 November 1995	list
(13169) 1995 XS_{1}	15 December 1995	list
(13170) 1995 YX	19 December 1995	list
(13171) 1996 AA	1 January 1996	list
(13172) 1996 AO	11 January 1996	list
(13173) 1996 AJ_{2}	13 January 1996	list
(13187) 1997 AN_{4}	6 January 1997	list
(13189) 1997 AF_{13}	11 January 1997	list
(13190) 1997 BN_{1}	29 January 1997	list
(13191) 1997 BP_{3}	31 January 1997	list
(13193) 1997 CW	1 February 1997	list
(13194) 1997 CA_{1}	1 February 1997	list
(13297) 1998 RX	12 September 1998	list
(13361) 1998 UM_{8}	24 October 1998	list
(13372) 1998 VU_{6}	12 November 1998	list
(13377) 1998 VN_{33}	15 November 1998	list
(13382) 1998 XC_{4}	11 December 1998	list
(13417) 1999 VH_{6}	5 November 1999	list
(13419) 1999 VJ_{10}	9 November 1999	list
(13420) 1999 VN_{10}	9 November 1999	list
(13426) 1999 VA_{25}	13 November 1999	list
(13427) 1999 VM_{25}	13 November 1999	list
(13589) 1993 XM	8 December 1993	list
(13590) 1994 AC_{3}	14 January 1994	list
(13591) 1994 BC_{1}	16 January 1994	list
(13592) 1994 JU	8 May 1994	list
(13616) 1994 XQ_{4}	7 December 1994	list
(13618) 1995 BF_{2}	30 January 1995	list
(13619) 1995 DN_{1}	22 February 1995	list
(13625) 1995 UP_{3}	20 October 1995	list
(13626) 1995 UD_{4}	20 October 1995	list
(13628) 1995 WE	16 November 1995	list
(13629) 1995 WD_{2}	18 November 1995	list
(13631) 1995 WL_{5}	24 November 1995	list
(13637) 1995 YO_{3}	27 December 1995	list
(13655) 1997 ER_{2}	4 March 1997	list
(13805) 1998 XN_{3}	9 December 1998	list
(13812) 1998 YR	16 December 1998	list
(13813) 1998 YX	16 December 1998	list
(13814) 1998 YG_{3}	17 December 1998	list
(13826) 1999 WM	16 November 1999	list
(13827) 1999 WK_{4}	28 November 1999	list

(13831) 1999 XD_{8}	3 December 1999	list
(13854) 1999 XX_{104}	10 December 1999	list
(13855) 1999 XX_{105}	11 December 1999	list
(13856) 1999 XZ_{105}	11 December 1999	list
(14013) 1993 YF	17 December 1993	list
(14033) 1994 YR	28 December 1994	list
(14034) 1995 BW	25 January 1995	list
(14035) 1995 CJ	1 February 1995	list
(14048) 1995 WS_{7}	27 November 1995	list
(14049) 1995 XH_{1}	15 December 1995	list
(14050) 1995 YH_{1}	21 December 1995	list
(14051) 1995 YY_{1}	21 December 1995	list
(14052) 1995 YH_{3}	27 December 1995	list
(14055) 1996 AS	10 January 1996	list
(14059) 1996 BB_{2}	25 January 1996	list
(14063) 1996 DZ	21 February 1996	list
(14107) 1997 VM_{5}	8 November 1997	list
(14167) 1998 UL_{8}	24 October 1998	list
(14180) 1998 WY_{5}	20 November 1998	list
(14188) 1998 XP_{11}	13 December 1998	list
(14202) 1998 YF_{3}	17 December 1998	list
(14221) 1999 WL	16 November 1999	list
(14237) 1999 YU_{9}	31 December 1999	list
(14239) 2000 AL_{2}	3 January 2000	list
(14240) 2000 AP_{2}	3 January 2000	list
(14273) 2000 BY_{14}	31 January 2000	list
(14276) 2000 CF_{2}	2 February 2000	list
(14475) 1993 VT	14 November 1993	list
(14478) 1994 CF_{2}	12 February 1994	list
(14497) 1995 DD	20 February 1995	list
14500 Kibo	27 November 1995	list
14501 Tetsuokojima	29 November 1995	list
14504 Tsujimura	27 December 1995	list
(14506) 1996 BL_{2}	26 January 1996	list
(14508) 1996 DH_{2}	23 February 1996	list
(14637) 1998 WN_{1}	18 November 1998	list
(14638) 1998 WQ_{1}	18 November 1998	list
(14639) 1998 WK_{3}	19 November 1998	list
(14644) 1998 XR_{3}	9 December 1998	list
(14650) 1998 YD_{3}	17 December 1998	list
(14653) 1998 YV_{11}	26 December 1998	list
(14662) 1999 BF_{12}	22 January 1999	list
(14677) 1999 XZ	2 December 1999	list
(14680) 1999 XV_{104}	10 December 1999	list
(14688) 2000 AJ_{2}	3 January 2000	list
(14689) 2000 AM_{2}	3 January 2000	list
(14704) 2000 CE_{2}	2 February 2000	list
(14705) 2000 CG_{2}	2 February 2000	list
(14706) 2000 CQ_{2}	4 February 2000	list
(14725) 2000 DC_{3}	27 February 2000	list

(14726) 2000 DD_{3}	27 February 2000	list
(14928) 1994 WN_{1}	27 November 1994	list
(14929) 1994 WP_{1}	27 November 1994	list
(14932) 1994 YC	24 December 1994	list
(14933) 1994 YX	28 December 1994	list
(14934) 1995 BP	23 January 1995	list
(14935) 1995 BP_{1}	25 January 1995	list
(14938) 1995 DN	21 February 1995	list
(14944) 1995 YV	19 December 1995	list
(14945) 1995 YM_{3}	27 December 1995	list
(14946) 1996 AN_{2}	13 January 1996	list
(14949) 1996 BA_{2}	24 January 1996	list
(14951) 1996 BS_{2}	26 January 1996	list
(14955) 1996 DX	21 February 1996	list
(14956) 1996 DB_{1}	22 February 1996	list
(14986) 1997 UJ_{3}	26 October 1997	list
(14987) 1997 UT_{3}	26 October 1997	list
15003 Midori	5 December 1997	list
(15038) 1998 WQ_{6}	23 November 1998	list
(15054) 1998 YS_{5}	21 December 1998	list
(15062) 1999 AL_{2}	9 January 1999	list
(15063) 1999 AQ_{3}	10 January 1999	list
(15066) 1999 AX_{7}	13 January 1999	list
(15078) 1999 CW	5 February 1999	list
(15095) 1999 WO_{3}	28 November 1999	list
(15104) 2000 BV_{3}	27 January 2000	list
(15152) 2000 FJ_{5}	29 March 2000	list
15335 Satoyukie	23 October 1993	list
(15348) 1994 UJ	31 October 1994	list
(15354) 1994 YN_{1}	31 December 1994	list
(15356) 1995 DE	20 February 1995	list
(15361) 1996 DK_{2}	23 February 1996	list
(15362) 1996 ED	9 March 1996	list
(15400) 1997 VZ	1 November 1997	list
(15408) 1997 WU_{21}	30 November 1997	list
(15439) 1998 WV_{1}	18 November 1998	list
(15446) 1998 XQ_{4}	12 December 1998	list
(15447) 1998 XV_{4}	12 December 1998	list
(15454) 1998 YB_{3}	17 December 1998	list
(15455) 1998 YJ_{3}	17 December 1998	list
(15463) 1999 AT_{2}	9 January 1999	list
(15464) 1999 AN_{5}	12 January 1999	list
15469 Ohmura	16 January 1999	list
(15477) 1999 CG_{1}	6 February 1999	list
(15514) 1999 VW_{24}	13 November 1999	list
(15519) 1999 XW	2 December 1999	list
(15538) 2000 BW_{14}	31 January 2000	list
(15549) 2000 FN	25 March 2000	list
(15799) 1993 XN	8 December 1993	list
(15800) 1993 XP	8 December 1993	list

(15801) 1994 AF	2 January 1994	list
(15802) 1994 AT_{2}	14 January 1994	list
(15812) 1994 PZ	14 August 1994	list
(15824) 1994 WM_{1}	27 November 1994	list
(15826) 1994 YO	28 December 1994	list
(15827) 1995 AO_{1}	10 January 1995	list
15828 Sincheskul	23 January 1995	list
(15829) 1995 BA_{1}	25 January 1995	list
(15830) 1995 BW_{1}	27 January 1995	list
(15835) 1995 DY	21 February 1995	list
(15847) 1995 WA_{2}	18 November 1995	list
(15850) 1996 AE_{1}	12 January 1996	list
(15852) 1996 BR_{1}	23 January 1996	list
(15878) 1996 XC_{3}	3 December 1996	list
(15880) 1997 AM_{7}	9 January 1997	list
(15881) 1997 CU	1 February 1997	list
(15885) 1997 EE	1 March 1997	list
(15886) 1997 EB_{6}	7 March 1997	list
(15909) 1997 TM_{17}	8 October 1997	list
(15914) 1997 UM_{3}	26 October 1997	list
(15915) 1997 UR_{3}	26 October 1997	list
(15923) 1997 VN_{3}	6 November 1997	list
(15927) 1997 WV_{2}	23 November 1997	list
(15928) 1997 WC_{3}	23 November 1997	list
(15933) 1997 YD	18 December 1997	list
(15934) 1997 YQ	20 December 1997	list
(15935) 1997 YT	20 December 1997	list
(15937) 1997 YP_{5}	25 December 1997	list
(15940) 1997 YU_{13}	31 December 1997	list
(15943) 1998 AZ	5 January 1998	list
(15948) 1998 BE	16 January 1998	list
(15953) 1998 BD_{8}	25 January 1998	list
(15956) 1998 BY_{24}	28 January 1998	list
(15983) 1998 WM_{1}	18 November 1998	list
(15991) 1998 YH_{3}	17 December 1998	list
(15993) 1998 YH_{8}	24 December 1998	list
(15996) 1998 YC_{12}	27 December 1998	list
(15997) 1999 AX	7 January 1999	list
(15998) 1999 AG_{2}	9 January 1999	list
(16003) 1999 BX_{2}	19 January 1999	list
(16008) 1999 CV	5 February 1999	list
(16009) 1999 CM_{8}	13 February 1999	list
(16108) 1999 WV_{3}	28 November 1999	list
(16665) 1993 XK	8 December 1993	list
(16668) 1993 XN_{1}	15 December 1993	list
(16670) 1994 AS_{2}	14 January 1994	list
(16673) 1994 BF_{1}	23 January 1994	list
(16691) 1994 VS	3 November 1994	list
(16692) 1994 VO_{1}	3 November 1994	list
(16694) 1995 AJ	2 January 1995	list

(16698) 1995 CX	3 February 1995	list
(16699) 1995 DC	20 February 1995	list
16700 Seiwa	22 February 1995	list
(16717) 1995 UJ_{8}	27 October 1995	list
(16720) 1995 WT	17 November 1995	list
(16726) 1996 DC	18 February 1996	list
(16768) 1996 UA_{1}	20 October 1996	list
(16775) 1996 VB_{6}	15 November 1996	list
(16778) 1996 WU_{1}	30 November 1996	list
(16780) 1996 XT_{1}	2 December 1996	list
(16782) 1996 XC_{19}	8 December 1996	list
(16785) 1997 AL_{1}	2 January 1997	list
(16787) 1997 AZ_{1}	3 January 1997	list
16788 Alyssarose	3 January 1997	list
(16791) 1997 AR_{5}	7 January 1997	list
(16792) 1997 AK_{13}	11 January 1997	list
(16793) 1997 AA_{18}	15 January 1997	list
(16795) 1997 CA_{3}	3 February 1997	list
(16811) 1997 UP_{3}	26 October 1997	list
(16812) 1997 UQ_{3}	26 October 1997	list
(16814) 1997 UY_{8}	29 October 1997	list
(16815) 1997 UA_{9}	29 October 1997	list
(16819) 1997 VW	1 November 1997	list
(16823) 1997 VE_{6}	9 November 1997	list
(16827) 1997 WD_{2}	23 November 1997	list
(16828) 1997 WR_{2}	23 November 1997	list
(16831) 1997 WM_{21}	30 November 1997	list
(16832) 1997 WR_{21}	30 November 1997	list
(16846) 1997 XA_{10}	5 December 1997	list
(16849) 1997 YV	20 December 1997	list
(16855) 1997 YN_{7}	27 December 1997	list
(16858) 1997 YG_{10}	28 December 1997	list
(16859) 1997 YJ_{10}	28 December 1997	list
(16862) 1997 YM_{14}	31 December 1997	list
(16864) 1998 AL	5 January 1998	list
(16865) 1998 AQ	5 January 1998	list
(16866) 1998 AR	5 January 1998	list
(16867) 1998 AX	5 January 1998	list
(16870) 1998 BB	16 January 1998	list
(16871) 1998 BD	16 January 1998	list
(16872) 1998 BZ	19 January 1998	list
(16873) 1998 BO_{1}	19 January 1998	list
(16876) 1998 BV_{6}	24 January 1998	list
(16877) 1998 BW_{6}	24 January 1998	list
(16884) 1998 BL_{25}	28 January 1998	list
(16886) 1998 BC_{26}	29 January 1998	list
(16971) 1998 WJ_{3}	19 November 1998	list
(16977) 1999 AS_{3}	10 January 1999	list
(16978) 1999 AN_{4}	11 January 1999	list
(16979) 1999 AO_{4}	11 January 1999	list

(16980) 1999 AP_{5}	12 January 1999	list
(16989) 1999 CX	5 February 1999	list
(16990) 1999 CS_{1}	7 February 1999	list
(16992) 1999 CU_{5}	12 February 1999	list
(17189) 1999 WU_{3}	28 November 1999	list
(17232) 2000 DE_{3}	27 February 2000	list
(17557) 1994 AX	4 January 1994	list
(17564) 1994 CQ_{1}	7 February 1994	list
(17565) 1994 CG_{2}	12 February 1994	list
(17571) 1994 PV	14 August 1994	list
(17578) 1994 QQ	16 August 1994	list
(17580) 1994 VV	3 November 1994	list
(17581) 1994 VE_{1}	4 November 1994	list
(17582) 1994 WL	25 November 1994	list
(17583) 1994 WV_{2}	30 November 1994	list
(17584) 1994 XF_{1}	6 December 1994	list
(17586) 1995 AT_{2}	10 January 1995	list
(17587) 1995 BD	20 January 1995	list
(17588) 1995 BH_{2}	30 January 1995	list
(17590) 1995 CG	1 February 1995	list
(17591) 1995 DG	20 February 1995	list
(17592) 1995 DR	22 February 1995	list
(17593) 1995 DV	20 February 1995	list
(17596) 1995 EP_{1}	11 March 1995	list
(17618) 1995 VO	4 November 1995	list
(17620) 1995 WY	18 November 1995	list
(17622) 1995 WW_{2}	20 November 1995	list
(17624) 1996 AT	10 January 1996	list
(17654) 1996 VK_{3}	6 November 1996	list
(17655) 1996 VL_{3}	6 November 1996	list
(17658) 1996 VS_{4}	13 November 1996	list
(17659) 1996 VX_{5}	15 November 1996	list
(17665) 1996 WD	16 November 1996	list
(17667) 1996 XT_{5}	7 December 1996	list
(17668) 1996 XW_{5}	7 December 1996	list
(17669) 1996 XF_{6}	7 December 1996	list
(17671) 1996 XS_{19}	11 December 1996	list
(17674) 1996 YG	20 December 1996	list
(17675) 1996 YU	20 December 1996	list
(17676) 1997 AG_{1}	2 January 1997	list
(17677) 1997 AW_{2}	4 January 1997	list
(17679) 1997 AK_{4}	6 January 1997	list
(17682) 1997 AR_{12}	10 January 1997	list
(17684) 1997 AS_{16}	14 January 1997	list
(17686) 1997 BC_{2}	29 January 1997	list
(17687) 1997 BN_{2}	30 January 1997	list
(17688) 1997 BM_{3}	31 January 1997	list
(17689) 1997 CS	1 February 1997	list
(17690) 1997 CY_{2}	3 February 1997	list
(17706) 1997 VA_{6}	9 November 1997	list

(17709) 1997 WV_{1}	19 November 1997	list
(17710) 1997 WT_{2}	23 November 1997	list
(17717) 1997 XL	3 December 1997	list
(17718) 1997 XZ	3 December 1997	list
(17724) 1997 YZ_{5}	25 December 1997	list
(17725) 1997 YQ_{7}	27 December 1997	list
(17727) 1997 YU_{11}	30 December 1997	list
(17733) 1998 BS_{1}	19 January 1998	list
(17742) 1998 BP_{25}	28 January 1998	list
(17766) 1998 ES_{3}	2 March 1998	list
(17769) 1998 EM_{9}	15 March 1998	list
(17874) 1998 YM_{3}	17 December 1998	list
(17875) 1999 AQ_{2}	9 January 1999	list
(17877) 1999 AZ_{22}	15 January 1999	list
(17888) 1999 DB_{3}	21 February 1999	list
(18057) 1999 VK_{10}	9 November 1999	list
(18074) 2000 DW	24 February 2000	list
(18424) 1993 YG	17 December 1993	list
(18425) 1993 YL	18 December 1993	list
(18427) 1994 AY	4 January 1994	list
(18428) 1994 AC_{1}	7 January 1994	list
(18432) 1994 CJ_{2}	13 February 1994	list
(18433) 1994 EQ	4 March 1994	list
(18455) 1995 DF	20 February 1995	list
(18468) 1995 UE_{8}	27 October 1995	list
(18475) 1995 WM_{7}	27 November 1995	list
(18476) 1995 WR_{7}	27 November 1995	list
(18479) 1995 XR	12 December 1995	list
(18480) 1995 YB	17 December 1995	list
(18481) 1995 YH	17 December 1995	list
(18482) 1995 YO	19 December 1995	list
(18483) 1995 YY_{2}	26 December 1995	list
(18485) 1996 AB	1 January 1996	list
(18486) 1996 AS_{2}	13 January 1996	list
(18491) 1996 DP_{2}	23 February 1996	list
(18517) 1996 VG_{2}	6 November 1996	list
(18521) 1996 VV_{5}	14 November 1996	list
(18522) 1996 VA_{6}	15 November 1996	list
(18530) 1996 XS_{1}	2 December 1996	list
(18532) 1996 XW_{2}	3 December 1996	list
(18539) 1996 XX_{30}	14 December 1996	list
(18540) 1996 XK_{31}	14 December 1996	list
(18541) 1996 YA_{1}	20 December 1996	list
(18543) 1997 AE	2 January 1997	list
(18544) 1997 AA_{2}	3 January 1997	list
(18545) 1997 AO_{2}	3 January 1997	list
(18546) 1997 AP_{4}	6 January 1997	list
(18547) 1997 AU_{5}	7 January 1997	list
(18549) 1997 AD_{13}	11 January 1997	list
(18554) 1997 BO_{1}	29 January 1997	list

(18559) 1997 EN_{2}	4 March 1997	list
(18570) 1997 VB_{6}	9 November 1997	list
(18571) 1997 WQ_{21}	30 November 1997	list
(18578) 1997 XP	3 December 1997	list
(18584) 1997 YB_{2}	21 December 1997	list
(18585) 1997 YE_{2}	21 December 1997	list
(18586) 1997 YD_{3}	24 December 1997	list
(18587) 1997 YR_{5}	25 December 1997	list
(18589) 1997 YL_{10}	28 December 1997	list
(18590) 1997 YO_{10}	28 December 1997	list
(18591) 1997 YT_{11}	30 December 1997	list
(18595) 1998 BR_{1}	19 January 1998	list
(18597) 1998 BE_{8}	25 January 1998	list
(18598) 1998 BH_{8}	25 January 1998	list
(18599) 1998 BK_{8}	25 January 1998	list
(18603) 1998 BM_{25}	28 January 1998	list
(18606) 1998 BS_{33}	31 January 1998	list
(18607) 1998 BT_{33}	31 January 1998	list
(18740) 1998 VH_{31}	14 November 1998	list
(18744) 1999 AU	7 January 1999	list
(19236) 1993 XV	11 December 1993	list
(19237) 1994 AP	4 January 1994	list
(19248) 1994 PT	14 August 1994	list
(19259) 1995 GB	1 April 1995	list
(19274) 1995 XA_{1}	15 December 1995	list
(19275) 1995 XF_{1}	15 December 1995	list
(19277) 1995 YD	17 December 1995	list
(19278) 1995 YN	19 December 1995	list
(19280) 1996 AV	11 January 1996	list
(19283) 1996 BJ_{2}	26 January 1996	list
(19284) 1996 BU_{3}	27 January 1996	list
(19286) 1996 DU	19 February 1996	list
(19316) 1996 WB	16 November 1996	list
(19317) 1996 WS_{1}	30 November 1996	list
(19319) 1996 XX_{2}	3 December 1996	list
(19320) 1996 XB_{6}	7 December 1996	list
(19326) 1996 XD_{19}	8 December 1996	list
(19327) 1996 XH_{19}	8 December 1996	list
(19329) 1996 XZ_{30}	14 December 1996	list
(19330) 1996 XJ_{31}	14 December 1996	list
(19335) 1996 YL_{2}	28 December 1996	list
(19336) 1997 AF	2 January 1997	list
(19337) 1997 AT	2 January 1997	list
(19338) 1997 AB_{2}	3 January 1997	list
(19339) 1997 AF_{4}	6 January 1997	list
(19340) 1997 AV_{4}	6 January 1997	list
(19341) 1997 AQ_{5}	7 January 1997	list
(19342) 1997 AA_{7}	9 January 1997	list
(19345) 1997 BV_{2}	30 January 1997	list
(19346) 1997 CG_{1}	1 February 1997	list

(19351) 1997 EK	1 March 1997	list
(19352) 1997 EL	1 March 1997	list
(19365) 1997 VL_{5}	8 November 1997	list
(19369) 1997 YO	20 December 1997	list
(19372) 1997 YP_{13}	31 December 1997	list
(19373) 1997 YC_{14}	31 December 1997	list
(19376) 1998 BE_{1}	19 January 1998	list
(19378) 1998 BB_{7}	24 January 1998	list
(19382) 1998 BH_{25}	28 January 1998	list
(19408) 1998 FM_{11}	22 March 1998	list
(19525) 1999 CO	5 February 1999	list
(19720) 1999 VP_{10}	9 November 1999	list
(19725) 1999 WT_{4}	28 November 1999	list
20070 Koichiyuko	8 December 1993	list
(20071) 1994 AG	2 January 1994	list
(20072) 1994 AG_{1}	7 January 1994	list
20073 Yumiko	9 January 1994	list^{[A]}
(20075) 1994 BX	19 January 1994	list
(20076) 1994 BH_{1}	23 January 1994	list
(20079) 1994 EP	4 March 1994	list
(20083) 1994 GE	3 April 1994	list
(20100) 1994 XM	4 December 1994	list
(20116) 1995 VE_{1}	15 November 1995	list
(20118) 1995 WX	17 November 1995	list
(20119) 1995 WC_{2}	18 November 1995	list
20120 Ryugatake	24 November 1995	list
(20121) 1995 WT_{7}	27 November 1995	list
(20129) 1996 BE_{1}	18 January 1996	list
(20130) 1996 BO_{1}	16 January 1996	list
(20131) 1996 BP_{3}	27 January 1996	list
(20133) 1996 CO_{2}	12 February 1996	list
(20162) 1996 UD	16 October 1996	list
(20163) 1996 UG	16 October 1996	list
(20166) 1996 VQ_{4}	13 November 1996	list
(20167) 1996 VX_{4}	13 November 1996	list
(20168) 1996 VY_{4}	13 November 1996	list
(20173) 1996 XO_{19}	8 December 1996	list
(20178) 1996 XE_{31}	14 December 1996	list
(20182) 1997 AS	2 January 1997	list
(20183) 1997 AD_{1}	2 January 1997	list
(20184) 1997 AM_{4}	6 January 1997	list
(20185) 1997 AC_{7}	9 January 1997	list
(20188) 1997 AC_{18}	15 January 1997	list
(20189) 1997 BS_{2}	30 January 1997	list
(20190) 1997 BZ_{2}	30 January 1997	list
(20191) 1997 BS_{3}	31 January 1997	list
(20196) 1997 CP_{19}	11 February 1997	list
(20231) 1997 YK	18 December 1997	list
(20232) 1997 YK_{2}	21 December 1997	list
(20235) 1998 BA_{7}	24 January 1998	list

(20244) 1998 EF	1 March 1998	list
(20260) 1998 FL_{11}	22 March 1998	list
(20432) 1999 BD_{12}	22 January 1999	list
(20675) 1999 VK_{6}	5 November 1999	list
(20681) 1999 VH_{10}	9 November 1999	list
(20704) 1999 WH	16 November 1999	list
(20705) 1999 WH_{3}	18 November 1999	list
(20706) 1999 WY_{3}	28 November 1999	list
(20707) 1999 WW_{4}	28 November 1999	list
(20708) 1999 XH_{1}	2 December 1999	list
(21167) 1993 XQ	9 December 1993	list
(21171) 1994 CG_{1}	7 February 1994	list
(21180) 1994 DC	16 February 1994	list
(21215) 1994 UQ	31 October 1994	list
(21217) 1994 VM_{1}	4 November 1994	list
(21220) 1994 WE_{4}	30 November 1994	list
(21221) 1994 YM_{1}	31 December 1994	list
(21222) 1995 BT	23 January 1995	list
(21223) 1995 DL	21 February 1995	list
(21233) 1995 UU_{3}	20 October 1995	list
21234 Nakashima	16 November 1995	list
(21235) 1995 WG_{2}	18 November 1995	list
21238 Panarea	28 November 1995	list
(21243) 1995 XG_{1}	15 December 1995	list
(21246) 1995 YF_{1}	21 December 1995	list
(21247) 1995 YJ_{1}	21 December 1995	list
(21248) 1995 YP_{1}	21 December 1995	list
(21249) 1995 YX_{1}	21 December 1995	list
(21285) 1996 UZ	20 October 1996	list
(21286) 1996 UB_{1}	20 October 1996	list
(21299) 1996 WC	16 November 1996	list
(21300) 1996 WA_{1}	19 November 1996	list
(21303) 1996 XJ_{1}	2 December 1996	list
(21304) 1996 XL_{1}	2 December 1996	list
(21305) 1996 XP_{1}	2 December 1996	list
(21307) 1996 XG_{3}	3 December 1996	list
(21310) 1996 XM_{5}	7 December 1996	list
(21320) 1996 XF_{31}	14 December 1996	list
(21321) 1997 AN_{2}	3 January 1997	list
(21322) 1997 AV_{2}	3 January 1997	list
(21323) 1997 AZ_{3}	6 January 1997	list
21326 Nitta-machi	8 January 1997	list
21327 Yabuzuka	11 January 1997	list
21328 Otashi	11 January 1997	list
(21333) 1997 BM_{2}	30 January 1997	list
(21334) 1997 BO_{2}	30 January 1997	list
(21335) 1997 BO_{3}	31 January 1997	list
(21338) 1997 CZ	1 February 1997	list
(21339) 1997 CL_{1}	1 February 1997	list
(21340) 1997 CS_{19}	11 February 1997	list

(21341) 1997 CV_{19}	12 February 1997	list
(21343) 1997 EF	1 March 1997	list
(21344) 1997 EM	2 March 1997	list
(21373) 1997 VF_{6}	9 November 1997	list
(21376) 1998 BP_{8}	25 January 1998	list
(21590) 1998 TK	10 October 1998	list
21900 Orus	9 November 1999	list
(21967) 1999 WS_{9}	30 November 1999	list
(21968) 1999 WE_{10}	30 November 1999	list
(22017) 1999 XT_{104}	10 December 1999	list
(22396) 1994 VR	3 November 1994	list
(22398) 1994 WF_{1}	27 November 1994	list
(22399) 1995 CB	1 February 1995	list
(22400) 1995 CC	1 February 1995	list
(22411) 1995 TR	2 October 1995	list
(22412) 1995 UQ_{4}	25 October 1995	list
(22417) 1995 WK_{1}	18 November 1995	list
(22418) 1995 WM_{4}	20 November 1995	list
(22419) 1995 WP_{5}	24 November 1995	list
(22425) 1996 AZ	11 January 1996	list
(22427) 1996 DB	18 February 1996	list
(22428) 1996 DT	19 February 1996	list
(22430) 1996 DM_{2}	23 February 1996	list
(22455) 1996 XK_{1}	2 December 1996	list
(22458) 1996 XD_{31}	14 December 1996	list
(22459) 1997 AD_{2}	3 January 1997	list
(22460) 1997 AJ_{2}	3 January 1997	list
(22461) 1997 AB_{7}	9 January 1997	list
(22462) 1997 AF_{7}	9 January 1997	list
(22466) 1997 BA_{3}	30 January 1997	list
22467 Koharumi	30 January 1997	list
(22468) 1997 CK_{1}	1 February 1997	list
(22506) 1997 WD_{8}	24 November 1997	list
(22509) 1997 YY_{2}	24 December 1997	list
(22511) 1997 YC_{10}	28 December 1997	list
(22759) 1998 XA_{4}	11 December 1998	list
(22760) 1998 XR_{4}	12 December 1998	list
(22763) 1999 AW_{3}	10 January 1999	list
(22764) 1999 AX_{3}	10 January 1999	list
(22765) 1999 AR_{5}	12 January 1999	list
(22969) 1999 VD_{6}	5 November 1999	list
(22979) 1999 VG_{25}	13 November 1999	list
(23021) 1999 WR_{3}	28 November 1999	list
(23022) 1999 WJ_{4}	28 November 1999	list
(23025) 1999 WR_{9}	30 November 1999	list
(23026) 1999 WV_{9}	30 November 1999	list
(23108) 1999 YP_{9}	31 December 1999	list
(23314) 2001 AU_{44}	15 January 2001	list
(23319) 2001 BR_{14}	21 January 2001	list
(23320) 2001 BP_{15}	21 January 2001	list

(23544) 1993 XW	11 December 1993	list
(23545) 1994 AC	2 January 1994	list
(23566) 1994 WS_{1}	27 November 1994	list
(23567) 1994 YG	21 December 1994	list
(23568) 1994 YU	28 December 1994	list
(23569) 1994 YF_{1}	28 December 1994	list
(23573) 1995 BG	23 January 1995	list
(23574) 1995 BX	25 January 1995	list
(23575) 1995 BE_{2}	30 January 1995	list
(23582) 1995 QA_{3}	31 August 1995	list
(23588) 1995 UX_{3}	20 October 1995	list
(23593) 1995 VJ	2 November 1995	list
(23596) 1995 WQ	17 November 1995	list
(23597) 1995 WY_{4}	24 November 1995	list
(23599) 1995 XV	12 December 1995	list
(23600) 1995 XC_{1}	15 December 1995	list
(23604) 1996 AL	11 January 1996	list
(23605) 1996 AP	11 January 1996	list
(23607) 1996 AR_{2}	13 January 1996	list
(23626) 1996 XD_{3}	3 December 1996	list
(23627) 1996 XG_{19}	8 December 1996	list
(23629) 1996 YR	20 December 1996	list
(23631) 1997 AG	2 January 1997	list
(23632) 1997 AQ	2 January 1997	list
(23633) 1997 AF_{3}	4 January 1997	list
(23634) 1997 AY_{3}	6 January 1997	list
(23635) 1997 AH_{4}	6 January 1997	list
(23636) 1997 AJ_{4}	6 January 1997	list
(23639) 1997 AN_{7}	9 January 1997	list
(23645) 1997 BJ_{2}	30 January 1997	list
(23646) 1997 BX_{2}	30 January 1997	list
(23647) 1997 BR_{3}	31 January 1997	list
(23652) 1997 CW_{19}	12 February 1997	list
(23655) 1997 CG_{26}	14 February 1997	list
(23656) 1997 CK_{26}	14 February 1997	list
(23659) 1997 EH	1 March 1997	list
(23714) 1998 EC_{3}	1 March 1998	list
(23847) 1998 RC_{1}	12 September 1998	list
(23948) 1998 UQ_{18}	25 October 1998	list
(23962) 1998 WO_{1}	18 November 1998	list
(23972) 1999 AA	3 January 1999	list
(24097) 1999 VB_{6}	5 November 1999	list
(24164) 1999 WM_{3}	28 November 1999	list
(24165) 1999 WQ_{3}	28 November 1999	list
(24166) 1999 WW_{3}	28 November 1999	list
(24167) 1999 WC_{4}	28 November 1999	list
(24171) 1999 XE_{1}	2 December 1999	list
(24172) 1999 XG_{1}	2 December 1999	list
(24180) 1999 XH_{8}	3 December 1999	list
(24235) 1999 XK_{95}	7 December 1999	list

(24248) 1999 XU_{105}	11 December 1999	list
(24310) 1999 YT_{9}	31 December 1999	list
(24314) 2000 AQ_{2}	3 January 2000	list
(24504) 2001 AD_{45}	15 January 2001	list
(24505) 2001 BZ	17 January 2001	list
(24506) 2001 BS_{15}	21 January 2001	list
(24762) 1993 DE_{1}	25 February 1993	list
(24805) 1994 RL_{1}	4 September 1994	list
(24811) 1994 VB	1 November 1994	list
(24812) 1994 VH	1 November 1994	list
(24813) 1994 VL_{1}	4 November 1994	list
(24817) 1994 WJ	25 November 1994	list
(24820) 1994 YK_{1}	31 December 1994	list
(24839) 1995 UE_{4}	20 October 1995	list
(24840) 1995 UN_{8}	27 October 1995	list
(24843) 1995 VZ	15 November 1995	list
(24846) 1995 WM	16 November 1995	list
(24851) 1995 XE	2 December 1995	list
(24853) 1995 YJ	17 December 1995	list
(24854) 1995 YU	19 December 1995	list
(24860) 1996 CK_{1}	11 February 1996	list
(24884) 1996 XL_{5}	7 December 1996	list
(24885) 1996 XQ_{5}	7 December 1996	list
(24887) 1996 XT_{19}	11 December 1996	list
(24891) 1997 AT_{2}	4 January 1997	list
(24892) 1997 AD_{3}	4 January 1997	list
(24893) 1997 AK_{5}	7 January 1997	list
(24900) 1997 AZ_{17}	15 January 1997	list
(24905) 1997 CO_{1}	1 February 1997	list
(24908) 1997 CE_{22}	13 February 1997	list
(24913) 1997 EQ_{2}	4 March 1997	list
(24914) 1997 EZ_{2}	4 March 1997	list
(24915) 1997 EC_{6}	7 March 1997	list
(24966) 1997 YB_{3}	24 December 1997	list
(25283) 1998 WU	17 November 1998	list
(25395) 1999 VF_{6}	5 November 1999	list
(25396) 1999 VL_{10}	9 November 1999	list
(25401) 1999 VY_{24}	13 November 1999	list
(25435) 1999 WX_{3}	28 November 1999	list
(25436) 1999 WE_{4}	28 November 1999	list
(25437) 1999 WP_{4}	28 November 1999	list
(25442) 1999 WQ_{9}	30 November 1999	list
(25443) 1999 WC_{10}	30 November 1999	list
(25445) 1999 XK_{1}	2 December 1999	list
(25451) 1999 XC_{8}	3 December 1999	list
(25471) 1999 XZ_{35}	6 December 1999	list
(25505) 1999 XQ_{95}	7 December 1999	list
(25506) 1999 XS_{95}	9 December 1999	list
(25507) 1999 XB_{96}	9 December 1999	list
(25508) 1999 XC_{96}	9 December 1999	list

(25523) 1999 XU_{104}	10 December 1999	list
(25524) 1999 XA_{106}	11 December 1999	list
(25596) 1999 YO_{9}	31 December 1999	list
(25749) 2000 BP_{3}	27 January 2000	list
(25754) 2000 BJ_{14}	28 January 2000	list
(25755) 2000 BR_{14}	28 January 2000	list
(25762) 2000 CO_{2}	2 February 2000	list
(25908) 2001 BJ	17 January 2001	list
(25918) 2001 DT_{13}	19 February 2001	list
(25948) 2001 EW_{15}	15 March 2001	list
(26154) 1994 VF_{1}	4 November 1994	list
(26156) 1994 WT	25 November 1994	list
(26157) 1994 WA_{1}	25 November 1994	list
(26158) 1994 WH_{1}	27 November 1994	list
(26160) 1994 XR_{4}	9 December 1994	list
(26163) 1995 DW	20 February 1995	list
26169 Ishikawakiyoshi	21 December 1995	list
(26173) 1996 DQ_{2}	23 February 1996	list
(26189) 1997 AX_{12}	10 January 1997	list
(26190) 1997 BG_{3}	30 January 1997	list
(26191) 1997 CZ_{2}	3 February 1997	list
(26193) 1997 CL_{20}	12 February 1997	list
(26216) 1997 VE_{3}	6 November 1997	list
(26217) 1997 WK_{2}	23 November 1997	list
(26219) 1997 WO_{21}	30 November 1997	list
(26309) 1998 TG	10 October 1998	list
(26322) 1998 VS_{6}	12 November 1998	list
(26339) 1998 XT_{3}	9 December 1998	list
(26353) 1998 YP	16 December 1998	list
(26358) 1998 YZ_{11}	26 December 1998	list
(26359) 1998 YF_{12}	27 December 1998	list
(26364) 1999 AH_{8}	13 January 1999	list
(26392) 1999 VT_{10}	9 November 1999	list
(26402) 1999 WB_{5}	28 November 1999	list
(26404) 1999 XF_{1}	2 December 1999	list
(26419) 1999 XR_{95}	7 December 1999	list
(26491) 2000 BT_{3}	27 January 2000	list
26500 Toshiohino	2 February 2000	list
26501 Sachiko	2 February 2000	list
(26535) 2000 DG_{3}	27 February 2000	list
(26538) 2000 DG_{7}	29 February 2000	list
(26888) 1994 XH	3 December 1994	list
(26889) 1995 BM_{1}	23 January 1995	list
(26899) 1995 UQ_{3}	20 October 1995	list
(26905) 1996 BC_{1}	16 January 1996	list
(26923) 1996 YZ	20 December 1996	list
(26925) 1997 AK_{2}	3 January 1997	list
(26928) 1997 CC_{17}	6 February 1997	list
(26930) 1997 CH_{20}	12 February 1997	list
(26931) 1997 CC_{22}	13 February 1997	list

(26932) 1997 EY_{2}	4 March 1997	list
(26977) 1997 US_{3}	26 October 1997	list
(26985) 1997 VP_{3}	6 November 1997	list
(26997) 1997 YJ_{5}	25 December 1997	list
(27090) 1998 UP_{18}	25 October 1998	list
(27100) 1998 VV_{6}	12 November 1998	list
(27115) 1998 WG_{3}	19 November 1998	list
(27116) 1998 WL_{3}	19 November 1998	list
(27117) 1998 WQ_{3}	19 November 1998	list
(27118) 1998 WD_{8}	25 November 1998	list
(27119) 1998 WH_{8}	25 November 1998	list
(27131) 1998 XU_{3}	9 December 1998	list
(27134) 1998 XO_{11}	13 December 1998	list
(27149) 1998 YN_{3}	17 December 1998	list
(27152) 1998 YN_{5}	21 December 1998	list
(27153) 1998 YO_{5}	21 December 1998	list
(27154) 1998 YG_{7}	22 December 1998	list
(27160) 1999 AQ_{4}	11 January 1999	list
(27161) 1999 AR_{4}	11 January 1999	list
(27175) 1999 BS_{2}	18 January 1999	list
(27180) 1999 CM_{1}	7 February 1999	list
(27181) 1999 CX_{1}	7 February 1999	list
(27268) 1999 YS_{9}	31 December 1999	list
(27316) 2000 BS_{3}	27 January 2000	list
(27317) 2000 BU_{3}	27 January 2000	list
(27321) 2000 CR_{2}	4 February 2000	list
(27428) 2000 FD_{5}	29 March 2000	list
(27852) 1994 WQ	25 November 1994	list
(27853) 1994 XA_{1}	6 December 1994	list
(27854) 1994 YG_{1}	28 December 1994	list
(27857) 1995 BZ	25 January 1995	list
(27859) 1995 BB_{2}	29 January 1995	list
(27872) 1995 WU_{7}	28 November 1995	list
(27873) 1995 XP_{1}	15 December 1995	list
(27874) 1995 YM_{1}	21 December 1995	list
(27875) 1996 BL_{3}	27 January 1996	list
(27878) 1996 CE_{1}	11 February 1996	list
(27891) 1996 HY	20 April 1996	list
(27919) 1996 VP_{4}	13 November 1996	list
(27925) 1997 CJ_{1}	1 February 1997	list
(27976) 1997 UY_{3}	26 October 1997	list
(27987) 1997 VR_{3}	6 November 1997	list
(27989) 1997 VG_{4}	7 November 1997	list
(27990) 1997 VD_{6}	9 November 1997	list
(27993) 1997 WK	18 November 1997	list
(27995) 1997 WL_{2}	23 November 1997	list
(27999) 1997 WV_{21}	30 November 1997	list
(28009) 1997 YY_{1}	21 December 1997	list
(28010) 1997 YE_{3}	24 December 1997	list
(28014) 1997 YS_{5}	25 December 1997	list

(28016) 1997 YV_{11}	30 December 1997	list
(28017) 1997 YV_{13}	31 December 1997	list
(28152) 1998 UK_{8}	24 October 1998	list
(28158) 1998 VT_{6}	12 November 1998	list
(28175) 1998 VM_{33}	15 November 1998	list
(28178) 1998 WL_{1}	18 November 1998	list
(28179) 1998 WR_{1}	18 November 1998	list
(28180) 1998 WU_{1}	18 November 1998	list
(28195) 1998 XW_{4}	12 December 1998	list
(28214) 1998 YW	16 December 1998	list
(28225) 1999 AS	7 January 1999	list
(28226) 1999 AE_{2}	9 January 1999	list
(28227) 1999 AN_{2}	9 January 1999	list
(28228) 1999 AU_{2}	9 January 1999	list
(28232) 1999 AS_{5}	12 January 1999	list
(28233) 1999 AV_{5}	12 January 1999	list
(28234) 1999 AB_{8}	13 January 1999	list
(28243) 1999 AA_{23}	15 January 1999	list
(28261) 1999 CJ	4 February 1999	list
(28264) 1999 CJ_{5}	12 February 1999	list
(28265) 1999 CL_{5}	12 February 1999	list
(28266) 1999 CP_{5}	12 February 1999	list
(28267) 1999 CH_{10}	15 February 1999	list
(28334) 1999 DJ_{2}	19 February 1999	list
(28335) 1999 DN_{2}	19 February 1999	list
(28423) 1999 WN_{3}	28 November 1999	list
(28471) 2000 BZ_{13}	27 January 2000	list
(28472) 2000 BE_{14}	28 January 2000	list
(28473) 2000 BF_{15}	31 January 2000	list
(28476) 2000 CK_{2}	2 February 2000	list
(28517) 2000 DD_{7}	29 February 2000	list
(28518) 2000 DE_{7}	29 February 2000	list
(28613) 2000 FG_{5}	29 March 2000	list
(28956) 2001 AA_{45}	15 January 2001	list
(29330) 1994 UK	31 October 1994	list
(29332) 1994 VE	1 November 1994	list
(29333) 1994 VE_{2}	8 November 1994	list
(29334) 1994 XJ	3 December 1994	list
(29335) 1994 XL	3 December 1994	list
(29336) 1994 YT_{1}	31 December 1994	list
(29339) 1995 BA	19 January 1995	list
(29340) 1995 BF	23 January 1995	list
(29341) 1995 BC_{1}	25 January 1995	list
(29344) 1995 DX	20 February 1995	list
(29364) 1996 DG	18 February 1996	list
(29365) 1996 DN_{2}	23 February 1996	list
(29407) 1996 UW	20 October 1996	list
(29409) 1996 VW_{5}	14 November 1996	list
(29410) 1996 VD_{6}	15 November 1996	list
(29413) 1996 XE_{1}	2 December 1996	list

(29414) 1996 XF_{1}	2 December 1996	list
(29415) 1996 XU_{5}	7 December 1996	list
(29416) 1996 XX_{5}	7 December 1996	list
(29418) 1997 AH_{13}	11 January 1997	list
(29425) 1997 CZ_{21}	13 February 1997	list
(29466) 1997 TN_{17}	8 October 1997	list
(29481) 1997 VJ_{3}	6 November 1997	list
(29482) 1997 VM_{3}	6 November 1997	list
(29488) 1997 WM	18 November 1997	list
(29489) 1997 WQ	18 November 1997	list
(29492) 1997 WP_{2}	23 November 1997	list
(29498) 1997 WK_{21}	30 November 1997	list
(29499) 1997 WT_{21}	30 November 1997	list
(29506) 1997 XM	3 December 1997	list
(29507) 1997 XV	3 December 1997	list
(29510) 1997 YF_{2}	21 December 1997	list
(29512) 1997 YL_{5}	25 December 1997	list
(29513) 1997 YT_{5}	25 December 1997	list
(29515) 1997 YL_{7}	27 December 1997	list
(29516) 1997 YO_{7}	27 December 1997	list
(29517) 1997 YQ_{10}	30 December 1997	list
(29520) 1997 YH_{14}	31 December 1997	list
(29521) 1997 YK_{14}	31 December 1997	list
(29526) 1998 AV	5 January 1998	list
(29529) 1998 BM	18 January 1998	list
(29530) 1998 BT	19 January 1998	list
(29531) 1998 BA_{1}	19 January 1998	list
(29532) 1998 BJ_{1}	19 January 1998	list
(29535) 1998 BF_{8}	25 January 1998	list
(29540) 1998 BV_{24}	28 January 1998	list
(29541) 1998 BZ_{24}	28 January 1998	list
(29542) 1998 BZ_{25}	29 January 1998	list
(29544) 1998 BE_{30}	30 January 1998	list
(29546) 1998 BV_{33}	31 January 1998	list
(29556) 1998 DR_{2}	21 February 1998	list
(29648) 1998 WM_{3}	19 November 1998	list
(29649) 1998 WP_{6}	23 November 1998	list
(29669) 1998 XZ_{3}	11 December 1998	list
(29670) 1998 XS_{4}	12 December 1998	list
(29673) 1998 XK_{11}	13 December 1998	list
(29698) 1998 YE_{3}	17 December 1998	list
(29699) 1998 YF_{4}	19 December 1998	list
(29703) 1998 YL_{7}	22 December 1998	list
(29709) 1999 AF_{2}	9 January 1999	list
(29710) 1999 AK_{2}	9 January 1999	list
(29711) 1999 AU_{5}	12 January 1999	list
(29715) 1999 AW_{7}	13 January 1999	list
(29716) 1999 AY_{7}	13 January 1999	list
(29717) 1999 AC_{8}	13 January 1999	list
(29731) 1999 BY_{2}	19 January 1999	list

(29732) 1999 BZ_{2}	19 January 1999	list
(29749) 1999 CN	5 February 1999	list
(29755) 1999 CT_{5}	12 February 1999	list
(29756) 1999 CW_{5}	12 February 1999	list
(29757) 1999 CH_{8}	13 February 1999	list
(29758) 1999 CN_{8}	13 February 1999	list
(30236) 2000 HF	23 April 2000	list
(30940) 1994 CL_{2}	14 February 1994	list
(30948) 1994 PU	14 August 1994	list
(30961) 1994 VD_{1}	4 November 1994	list
(30967) 1994 XX_{4}	9 December 1994	list
(30970) 1995 BP_{3}	31 January 1995	list
(30971) 1995 DJ	21 February 1995	list
(30974) 1995 EL	5 March 1995	list
(30975) 1995 EM	6 March 1995	list
(30995) 1995 UZ_{3}	20 October 1995	list
(31008) 1996 BN_{2}	26 January 1996	list
(31010) 1996 CJ_{1}	11 February 1996	list
(31013) 1996 DR	19 February 1996	list
(31014) 1996 DW	21 February 1996	list
(31016) 1996 DY_{1}	23 February 1996	list
(31025) 1996 GR	12 April 1996	list
(31076) 1996 XH_{1}	2 December 1996	list
(31077) 1996 XZ_{2}	3 December 1996	list
(31078) 1996 XJ_{5}	6 December 1996	list
(31079) 1996 XS_{5}	7 December 1996	list
(31080) 1996 XA_{6}	7 December 1996	list
(31082) 1996 XM_{19}	8 December 1996	list
(31085) 1997 AV_{12}	10 January 1997	list
(31089) 1997 BW_{1}	29 January 1997	list
(31127) 1997 SL_{4}	27 September 1997	list
(31146) 1997 UV_{3}	26 October 1997	list
(31154) 1997 VJ	1 November 1997	list
(31155) 1997 VG_{2}	1 November 1997	list
(31156) 1997 WO	18 November 1997	list
(31158) 1997 WE_{3}	23 November 1997	list
(31171) 1997 XB	2 December 1997	list
(31172) 1997 XQ	3 December 1997	list
(31185) 1997 YK_{5}	25 December 1997	list
(31186) 1997 YQ_{5}	25 December 1997	list
(31187) 1997 YK_{7}	27 December 1997	list
(31188) 1997 YM_{7}	27 December 1997	list
(31198) 1998 AB_{1}	5 January 1998	list
(31205) 1998 BW	19 January 1998	list
(31206) 1998 BF_{1}	19 January 1998	list
(31207) 1998 BM_{1}	19 January 1998	list
(31208) 1998 BU_{1}	19 January 1998	list
(31209) 1998 BZ_{6}	24 January 1998	list
(31219) 1998 BW_{24}	28 January 1998	list
(31220) 1998 BA_{26}	29 January 1998	list

(31224) 1998 BP_{33}	31 January 1998	list
(31258) 1998 EE	1 March 1998	list
(31366) 1998 WF_{8}	25 November 1998	list
(31370) 1998 XS_{3}	9 December 1998	list
(31372) 1998 XN_{11}	13 December 1998	list
(31390) 1998 YB_{4}	19 December 1998	list
(31393) 1998 YG_{8}	24 December 1998	list
(31396) 1998 YQ_{12}	29 December 1998	list
31402 Negishi	7 January 1999	list
(31403) 1999 AV	7 January 1999	list
(31405) 1999 AD_{2}	9 January 1999	list
(31406) 1999 AA_{4}	10 January 1999	list
(31407) 1999 AP_{4}	11 January 1999	list
(31408) 1999 AV_{4}	11 January 1999	list
(31409) 1999 AB_{5}	11 January 1999	list
(31410) 1999 AY_{5}	12 January 1999	list
(31423) 1999 BR_{2}	18 January 1999	list
(31424) 1999 BW_{2}	18 January 1999	list
(31445) 1999 CS_{5}	12 February 1999	list
(31446) 1999 CV_{5}	12 February 1999	list
(31449) 1999 CO_{9}	14 February 1999	list
(31540) 1999 DK_{2}	19 February 1999	list
(31541) 1999 DC_{3}	21 February 1999	list
(31666) 1999 JK_{3}	8 May 1999	list
(31667) 1999 JL_{3}	8 May 1999	list
(31826) 1999 VM_{2}	5 November 1999	list
(32912) 1994 WS_{2}	30 November 1994	list
(32915) 1995 BD_{2}	30 January 1995	list
(32916) 1995 CL	1 February 1995	list
(32917) 1995 CM	1 February 1995	list
(32918) 1995 CZ	3 February 1995	list
(32937) 1995 TT	13 October 1995	list
(32940) 1995 UW_{4}	26 October 1995	list
(32977) 1996 VR_{4}	13 November 1996	list
(32988) 1996 XK_{19}	8 December 1996	list
(32991) 1997 AC_{3}	4 January 1997	list
(32993) 1997 AX_{6}	9 January 1997	list
(32995) 1997 BS_{1}	29 January 1997	list
(32996) 1997 CV	1 February 1997	list
(33003) 1997 EJ	1 March 1997	list
(33047) 1997 UO_{3}	26 October 1997	list
(33060) 1997 VY	1 November 1997	list
(33063) 1997 VB_{3}	6 November 1997	list
(33064) 1997 VS_{3}	6 November 1997	list
(33065) 1997 VQ_{5}	8 November 1997	list
(33067) 1997 WJ	18 November 1997	list
(33069) 1997 WQ_{2}	23 November 1997	list
(33074) 1997 WP_{21}	30 November 1997	list
(33086) 1997 XS	3 December 1997	list
(33087) 1997 XX	3 December 1997	list

(33093) 1997 YF_{3}	24 December 1997	list
(33095) 1997 YM_{5}	25 December 1997	list
(33098) 1997 YG_{7}	25 December 1997	list
(33101) 1997 YN_{10}	28 December 1997	list
(33105) 1997 YB_{14}	31 December 1997	list
(33111) 1998 BL	18 January 1998	list
(33112) 1998 BL_{1}	19 January 1998	list
(33115) 1998 BB_{8}	25 January 1998	list
(33124) 1998 BN_{33}	31 January 1998	list
(33125) 1998 BU_{33}	31 January 1998	list
(33126) 1998 BB_{34}	31 January 1998	list
(33173) 1998 FC	16 March 1998	list
(33174) 1998 FK_{3}	22 March 1998	list
(33357) 1999 AX_{5}	12 January 1999	list
(33358) 1999 AD_{8}	13 January 1999	list
(33366) 1999 BF_{7}	21 January 1999	list
(33425) 1999 DP_{2}	19 February 1999	list
(33426) 1999 DR_{2}	19 February 1999	list
(33427) 1999 DZ_{2}	21 February 1999	list
(33481) 1999 GH_{1}	7 April 1999	list
(33804) 1999 WL_{4}	28 November 1999	list
(33827) 2000 ED	1 March 2000	list
(35185) 1993 VS	14 November 1993	list
(35189) 1994 AE	2 January 1994	list
(35190) 1994 AW	4 January 1994	list
(35217) 1994 VK_{1}	4 November 1994	list
(35218) 1994 WU_{2}	30 November 1994	list
(35219) 1994 WY_{2}	30 November 1994	list
(35221) 1994 XK_{1}	7 December 1994	list
(35223) 1995 BR	23 January 1995	list
(35224) 1995 BN_{1}	25 January 1995	list
(35230) 1995 GW	7 April 1995	list
(35302) 1996 XD_{6}	7 December 1996	list
(35310) 1997 AX_{1}	3 January 1997	list
(35311) 1997 AE_{2}	3 January 1997	list
(35312) 1997 AX_{2}	4 January 1997	list
(35376) 1997 VJ_{5}	8 November 1997	list
(35377) 1997 WN_{2}	23 November 1997	list
(35380) 1997 WJ_{21}	30 November 1997	list
(35389) 1997 XO	3 December 1997	list
(35390) 1997 XW	3 December 1997	list
(35397) 1997 YJ	18 December 1997	list
(35398) 1997 YR	20 December 1997	list
(35404) 1997 YV_{5}	25 December 1997	list
(35408) 1997 YS_{13}	31 December 1997	list
(35409) 1997 YT_{13}	31 December 1997	list
(35413) 1998 AS	5 January 1998	list
(35423) 1998 AL_{7}	6 January 1998	list
(35424) 1998 BK	18 January 1998	list
(35425) 1998 BY	19 January 1998	list

(35426) 1998 BN_{1}	19 January 1998	list
(35430) 1998 BT_{6}	24 January 1998	list
(35431) 1998 BY_{6}	24 January 1998	list
(35439) 1998 BK_{25}	28 January 1998	list
(35442) 1998 BR_{33}	31 January 1998	list
(35467) 1998 ED	1 March 1998	list
(35482) 1998 FJ_{11}	22 March 1998	list
(35679) 1998 YK_{3}	17 December 1998	list
(35682) 1999 BP_{2}	18 January 1999	list
(35700) 1999 DL_{2}	19 February 1999	list
(35727) 1999 GM_{1}	7 April 1999	list
(35767) 1999 JM	6 May 1999	list
(37641) 1994 AO_{3}	15 January 1994	list
(37647) 1994 ES_{3}	15 March 1994	list
(37672) 1994 VC	1 November 1994	list
(37677) 1995 CA_{1}	3 February 1995	list
(37741) 1996 WR_{1}	30 November 1996	list
(37747) 1996 YS	20 December 1996	list
(37748) 1997 AF_{2}	3 January 1997	list
(37751) 1997 CH_{1}	1 February 1997	list
(37755) 1997 EA	1 March 1997	list
(37793) 1997 WE	18 November 1997	list
(37795) 1997 WC_{8}	24 November 1997	list
(37803) 1997 YY	20 December 1997	list
(37805) 1997 YM_{10}	28 December 1997	list
(37806) 1997 YQ_{11}	30 December 1997	list
(37808) 1997 YL_{14}	31 December 1997	list
(37815) 1998 BK_{1}	19 January 1998	list
(37820) 1998 BL_{8}	25 January 1998	list
(37821) 1998 BM_{8}	25 January 1998	list
(37822) 1998 BQ_{8}	25 January 1998	list
(37823) 1998 BS_{8}	25 January 1998	list
(37826) 1998 BS_{24}	28 January 1998	list
(37828) 1998 BK_{33}	31 January 1998	list
(37829) 1998 BQ_{33}	31 January 1998	list
(37830) 1998 BX_{33}	31 January 1998	list
(38574) 1999 WS_{4}	28 November 1999	list
(39613) 1993 XF_{1}	14 December 1993	list
(39614) 1993 YK	17 December 1993	list
(39615) 1994 AU	4 January 1994	list
(39632) 1994 UL	31 October 1994	list
(39633) 1994 WO	25 November 1994	list
(39673) 1996 BN_{3}	27 January 1996	list
(39716) 1996 VD_{2}	6 November 1996	list
(39717) 1996 VE_{2}	6 November 1996	list
(39730) 1996 XP_{5}	7 December 1996	list
(39736) 1997 AM	2 January 1997	list
(39737) 1997 AE_{1}	2 January 1997	list
(39738) 1997 AP_{2}	3 January 1997	list
(39739) 1997 AQ_{2}	3 January 1997	list

(39740) 1997 AG_{4}	6 January 1997	list
(39744) 1997 AT_{16}	14 January 1997	list
(39751) 1997 CX_{2}	3 February 1997	list
(39755) 1997 CY_{21}	13 February 1997	list
(39804) 1997 VP_{5}	8 November 1997	list
(39805) 1997 WG_{2}	23 November 1997	list
(39806) 1997 WX_{2}	23 November 1997	list
(39817) 1997 YN	20 December 1997	list
(39819) 1997 YE_{10}	28 December 1997	list
(39822) 1998 BO	18 January 1998	list
(39823) 1998 BV	19 January 1998	list
(39824) 1998 BQ_{1}	19 January 1998	list
(39830) 1998 BS_{6}	24 January 1998	list
(39831) 1998 BU_{6}	24 January 1998	list
(39833) 1998 BS_{10}	25 January 1998	list
(39841) 1998 BU_{24}	28 January 1998	list
(39843) 1998 BB_{26}	29 January 1998	list
(40249) 1998 XM_{11}	13 December 1998	list
(41051) 1999 VR_{10}	9 November 1999	list
(41201) 1999 WF_{4}	28 November 1999	list
(41211) 1999 XB_{1}	2 December 1999	list
(41280) 1999 XJ_{95}	7 December 1999	list
(41281) 1999 XZ_{95}	9 December 1999	list
(41339) 1999 YR_{9}	31 December 1999	list
(41987) 2000 YW_{29}	27 December 2000	list
(42109) 2001 AX_{44}	15 January 2001	list
(42110) 2001 AC_{45}	15 January 2001	list
(42126) 2001 BC_{15}	21 January 2001	list
(42127) 2001 BT_{15}	21 January 2001	list
(42128) 2001 BV_{15}	21 January 2001	list
(42190) 2001 CM_{36}	15 February 2001	list
(42226) 2001 DO_{81}	26 February 2001	list
(42238) 2001 FF_{4}	19 March 2001	list
(42530) 1995 GA	1 April 1995	list
(42534) 1995 UL_{7}	27 October 1995	list
(42537) 1995 WZ_{1}	18 November 1995	list
(42538) 1995 WZ_{7}	29 November 1995	list
(42541) 1996 AQ	11 January 1996	list
(42542) 1996 AX	11 January 1996	list
(42568) 1996 YC	20 December 1996	list
(42569) 1996 YC_{1}	20 December 1996	list
(42572) 1997 AO	2 January 1997	list
(42573) 1997 AN_{1}	2 January 1997	list
(42574) 1997 AE_{3}	4 January 1997	list
(42575) 1997 AD_{4}	6 January 1997	list
(42576) 1997 AP_{5}	7 January 1997	list
(42577) 1997 AB_{18}	15 January 1997	list
(42600) 1997 YF_{10}	28 December 1997	list
(42602) 1998 BX_{6}	24 January 1998	list
(42732) 1998 RD_{1}	12 September 1998	list

(42798) 1999 DH_{2}	19 February 1999	list
(43029) 1999 VT_{24}	13 November 1999	list
(43030) 1999 VK_{25}	13 November 1999	list
(43091) 1999 XL_{1}	2 December 1999	list
(43095) 1999 XF_{8}	3 December 1999	list
(43148) 1999 XB_{106}	11 December 1999	list
(43245) 2000 BB_{15}	31 January 2000	list
(43261) 2000 DF_{3}	27 February 2000	list
(43462) 2001 AV	2 January 2001	list
(43479) 2001 BG_{15}	21 January 2001	list
(43480) 2001 BO_{15}	21 January 2001	list
(43487) 2001 BJ_{60}	29 January 2001	list
(43506) 2001 CE_{36}	15 February 2001	list
(43517) 2001 DO_{13}	19 February 2001	list
(43858) 1994 AT	4 January 1994	list
43859 Naoyayano	9 January 1994	list^{[A]}
(43862) 1994 EK_{1}	6 March 1994	list
(43873) 1994 VD	1 November 1994	list
(43876) 1994 XV_{4}	9 December 1994	list
(43895) 1995 UC_{4}	20 October 1995	list
(43896) 1995 UL_{4}	20 October 1995	list
(43897) 1995 VC	1 November 1995	list
(43898) 1995 VN	2 November 1995	list
(43903) 1995 WC	16 November 1995	list
(43906) 1995 WK_{4}	20 November 1995	list
(43907) 1995 WX_{4}	20 November 1995	list
(43913) 1995 YT	17 December 1995	list
(43914) 1995 YC_{2}	19 December 1995	list
(43916) 1996 AP_{2}	13 January 1996	list
(43940) 1996 XY_{5}	7 December 1996	list
(43941) 1996 YP	20 December 1996	list
(43942) 1996 YX	20 December 1996	list
(43943) 1997 AV	2 January 1997	list
(43944) 1997 AW_{1}	3 January 1997	list
(43945) 1997 AS_{2}	3 January 1997	list
(43947) 1997 AE_{7}	9 January 1997	list
(43948) 1997 AU_{12}	10 January 1997	list
(43950) 1997 BG_{1}	28 January 1997	list
(43953) 1997 CB_{1}	1 February 1997	list
(44014) 1997 WT_{1}	19 November 1997	list
(44028) 1998 BD_{1}	19 January 1998	list
(44034) 1998 DB	17 February 1998	list
(44476) 1998 WN_{3}	19 November 1998	list
(44497) 1998 XJ_{11}	13 December 1998	list
(44498) 1998 XL_{11}	13 December 1998	list
(44524) 1998 YZ_{3}	19 December 1998	list
(44525) 1998 YE_{4}	19 December 1998	list
(44538) 1999 AO_{2}	9 January 1999	list
(44554) 1999 CQ_{9}	14 February 1999	list
(44889) 1999 VC_{6}	5 November 1999	list

(44909) 1999 VV_{24}	13 November 1999	list
(44910) 1999 VX_{24}	13 November 1999	list
(44911) 1999 VJ_{25}	13 November 1999	list
(44912) 1999 VN_{25}	13 November 1999	list
(45013) 1999 WK	16 November 1999	list
(45014) 1999 WP	18 November 1999	list
(45017) 1999 WK_{3}	28 November 1999	list
(45018) 1999 WS_{3}	28 November 1999	list
(45019) 1999 WU_{4}	28 November 1999	list
(45020) 1999 WC_{5}	28 November 1999	list
(45029) 1999 WN_{9}	30 November 1999	list
(45040) 1999 XJ_{8}	3 December 1999	list
(45146) 1999 XC_{106}	11 December 1999	list
45500 Motegi	27 January 2000	list
(45501) 2000 BQ_{3}	27 January 2000	list
(45503) 2000 BE_{15}	31 January 2000	list
(45524) 2000 CL_{2}	2 February 2000	list
(45904) 2000 YV_{29}	27 December 2000	list
(45957) 2001 AQ_{44}	15 January 2001	list
(45958) 2001 AF_{45}	15 January 2001	list
(45960) 2001 BX	17 January 2001	list
(45963) 2001 BX_{14}	21 January 2001	list
(45964) 2001 BE_{15}	21 January 2001	list
(45981) 2001 BW_{50}	28 January 2001	list
(46015) 2001 CJ_{36}	15 February 2001	list
(46091) 2001 ES_{15}	15 March 2001	list
(46394) 2002 AZ_{10}	11 January 2002	list
(46616) 1994 AM	2 January 1994	list
(46617) 1994 BD_{1}	19 January 1994	list
(46620) 1994 EL_{1}	6 March 1994	list
(46633) 1994 VH_{1}	4 November 1994	list
(46638) 1995 BO_{3}	31 January 1995	list
(46640) 1995 DU	20 February 1995	list
(46661) 1996 CP_{1}	12 February 1996	list
(46662) 1996 DO	19 February 1996	list
(46680) 1996 YV	20 December 1996	list
(46681) 1997 AN_{5}	7 January 1997	list
(46685) 1997 AG_{13}	11 January 1997	list
(46693) 1997 CK_{4}	4 February 1997	list
(46696) 1997 CF_{20}	12 February 1997	list
(46697) 1997 CM_{20}	12 February 1997	list
(46699) 1997 CL_{26}	14 February 1997	list
(46703) 1997 EC	1 March 1997	list
(46746) 1998 BX_{24}	28 January 1998	list
(47036) 1998 WP_{1}	18 November 1998	list
(47041) 1998 WO_{3}	19 November 1998	list
(47042) 1998 WP_{3}	19 November 1998	list
(47076) 1998 YV	16 December 1998	list
(47087) 1999 AY_{3}	10 January 1999	list
(47223) 1999 VW_{10}	9 November 1999	list

(47227) 1999 VS_{24}	13 November 1999	list
(47299) 1999 WJ_{3}	28 November 1999	list
(47300) 1999 WN_{4}	28 November 1999	list
(47304) 1999 WH_{8}	28 November 1999	list
(47312) 1999 XG_{8}	3 December 1999	list
(47337) 1999 XB_{36}	6 December 1999	list
(47338) 1999 XG_{36}	6 December 1999	list
(47472) 2000 AN_{2}	3 January 2000	list
(47561) 2000 AA_{147}	4 January 2000	list
(47614) 2000 BO_{14}	28 January 2000	list
(47628) 2000 CJ_{2}	2 February 2000	list
(47998) 2001 AZ_{44}	15 January 2001	list
(48022) 2001 DJ_{7}	16 February 2001	list
(48023) 2001 DL_{7}	16 February 2001	list
(48045) 2001 DD_{81}	26 February 2001	list
(48593) 1994 VF	1 November 1994	list
(48595) 1994 VH_{2}	9 November 1994	list
(48597) 1994 XP_{4}	3 December 1994	list
(48598) 1994 XD_{5}	9 December 1994	list
(48599) 1994 YS	28 December 1994	list
(48600) 1994 YZ	28 December 1994	list
(48601) 1995 BL	23 January 1995	list
(48602) 1995 BV_{1}	27 January 1995	list
(48603) 1995 BC_{2}	30 January 1995	list
(48606) 1995 DH	20 February 1995	list
(48645) 1995 UF_{8}	27 October 1995	list
(48646) 1995 UL_{8}	27 October 1995	list
(48652) 1995 VB	1 November 1995	list
(48653) 1995 VD	1 November 1995	list
(48657) 1995 WK	16 November 1995	list
(48660) 1995 WA_{5}	24 November 1995	list
(48661) 1995 WH_{5}	24 November 1995	list
(48662) 1995 WK_{5}	24 November 1995	list
(48663) 1995 WY_{7}	29 November 1995	list
(48668) 1995 XB_{1}	15 December 1995	list
(48669) 1995 YO_{1}	21 December 1995	list
(48670) 1995 YW_{2}	26 December 1995	list
(48671) 1995 YS_{3}	27 December 1995	list
(48682) 1996 BP_{1}	23 January 1996	list
(48683) 1996 BQ_{1}	23 January 1996	list
(48725) 1997 AQ_{1}	2 January 1997	list
(48726) 1997 AZ_{12}	10 January 1997	list
(48730) 1997 BD_{3}	30 January 1997	list
(48731) 1997 BV_{3}	31 January 1997	list
(48735) 1997 CX_{19}	12 February 1997	list
(48786) 1997 SH_{4}	27 September 1997	list
(48808) 1997 VK_{3}	6 November 1997	list
(48811) 1997 WH	18 November 1997	list
(48812) 1997 WL	18 November 1997	list
(48814) 1997 WF_{2}	23 November 1997	list

(48815) 1997 WA_{3}	23 November 1997	list
(48827) 1997 YB	18 December 1997	list
(48828) 1997 YU	20 December 1997	list
(48830) 1997 YN_{2}	21 December 1997	list
(48831) 1997 YG_{3}	24 December 1997	list
(48836) 1998 AW	5 January 1998	list
(49041) 1998 RW	12 September 1998	list
(49325) 1998 VK_{31}	14 November 1998	list
(49326) 1998 VL_{31}	14 November 1998	list
(49343) 1998 WH_{3}	19 November 1998	list
(49348) 1998 WO_{6}	23 November 1998	list
(49380) 1998 XU_{4}	12 December 1998	list
(49381) 1998 XX_{4}	12 December 1998	list
(49433) 1998 YS	16 December 1998	list
(49438) 1998 YD_{4}	19 December 1998	list
(49447) 1998 YW_{11}	26 December 1998	list
(49458) 1999 AH_{2}	9 January 1999	list
(49459) 1999 AJ_{2}	9 January 1999	list
(49460) 1999 AT_{4}	11 January 1999	list
(49468) 1999 AE_{24}	15 January 1999	list
(49474) 1999 BL	16 January 1999	list
(49493) 1999 CD	4 February 1999	list
(49494) 1999 CJ_{1}	6 February 1999	list
(49495) 1999 CU_{1}	7 February 1999	list
(49496) 1999 CC_{2}	8 February 1999	list
(49499) 1999 CJ_{8}	13 February 1999	list
49500 Ishitoshi	14 February 1999	list
(49591) 1999 DO_{2}	19 February 1999	list
(49768) 1999 WP_{3}	28 November 1999	list
(49773) 1999 WJ_{8}	28 November 1999	list
(49774) 1999 WT_{9}	30 November 1999	list
(49805) 1999 XC_{36}	6 December 1999	list
(49851) 1999 XM_{95}	7 December 1999	list
(49852) 1999 XA_{96}	9 December 1999	list
(49864) 1999 XS_{104}	10 December 1999	list
(49986) 2000 AF_{2}	3 January 2000	list
(50237) 2000 BJ_{3}	27 January 2000	list
(50238) 2000 BR_{3}	27 January 2000	list
(50239) 2000 BW_{3}	27 January 2000	list
(50245) 2000 BL_{14}	28 January 2000	list
(50246) 2000 BT_{14}	28 January 2000	list
(50247) 2000 BX_{14}	31 January 2000	list
(50276) 2000 CS_{2}	4 February 2000	list
(50411) 2000 DS	24 February 2000	list
(50416) 2000 DZ_{2}	24 February 2000	list
(50418) 2000 DC_{7}	29 February 2000	list
(50419) 2000 DL_{7}	29 February 2000	list
(50420) 2000 DN_{7}	29 February 2000	list
(50765) 2000 FM	25 March 2000	list
(50770) 2000 FE_{5}	29 March 2000	list

(50771) 2000 FH_{5}	29 March 2000	list
(51092) 2000 HH	23 April 2000	list
(51399) 2001 DG_{81}	26 February 2001	list
(51400) 2001 DN_{81}	26 February 2001	list
(51416) 2001 EX_{15}	15 March 2001	list
(51427) 2001 FE_{4}	19 March 2001	list
(52411) 1994 AA_{3}	14 January 1994	list
(52449) 1994 VJ	1 November 1994	list
(52450) 1994 VL	1 November 1994	list
(52451) 1994 VU	3 November 1994	list
(52452) 1994 VQ_{1}	3 November 1994	list
(52453) 1994 WC	23 November 1994	list
(52485) 1995 WD	16 November 1995	list
(52489) 1995 YG_{3}	26 December 1995	list
(52499) 1996 CL_{1}	11 February 1996	list
52500 Kanata	22 February 1996	list
(52501) 1996 DJ_{2}	23 February 1996	list
(52542) 1996 VU_{4}	13 November 1996	list
(52547) 1996 XQ_{1}	2 December 1996	list
(52549) 1996 XB_{31}	14 December 1996	list
(52551) 1997 AL	2 January 1997	list
(52599) 1997 SK_{4}	27 September 1997	list
(52611) 1997 UL_{3}	26 October 1997	list
(52620) 1997 VQ_{3}	6 November 1997	list
(52622) 1997 VT_{5}	8 November 1997	list
(52625) 1997 WD	18 November 1997	list
(52627) 1997 WU_{2}	23 November 1997	list
(52632) 1997 WN_{21}	30 November 1997	list
(52643) 1997 XK	3 December 1997	list
(52646) 1997 YC	18 December 1997	list
(52648) 1997 YN_{5}	25 December 1997	list
(52657) 1998 AK_{7}	5 January 1998	list
(52660) 1998 BJ_{8}	25 January 1998	list
(52661) 1998 BT_{8}	25 January 1998	list
(52666) 1998 BL_{33}	31 January 1998	list
(52954) 1998 TD	9 October 1998	list
(52955) 1998 TJ	10 October 1998	list
(53009) 1998 VR_{6}	12 November 1998	list
(53032) 1998 WE_{8}	25 November 1998	list
(53051) 1998 XT_{4}	12 December 1998	list
(53087) 1998 YQ	16 December 1998	list
(53089) 1998 YM_{5}	21 December 1998	list
(53092) 1998 YA_{12}	27 December 1998	list
(53101) 1999 AY	7 January 1999	list
(53102) 1999 AZ	7 January 1999	list
(53104) 1999 AP_{3}	10 January 1999	list
(53105) 1999 AT_{3}	10 January 1999	list
(53107) 1999 AU_{4}	11 January 1999	list
(53108) 1999 AW_{4}	11 January 1999	list
(53123) 1999 AB_{23}	15 January 1999	list

(53135) 1999 BA_{3}	19 January 1999	list
(53136) 1999 BB_{3}	19 January 1999	list
(53156) 1999 CF	4 February 1999	list
(53158) 1999 CW_{1}	7 February 1999	list
(53163) 1999 CK_{8}	13 February 1999	list
(53166) 1999 CG_{10}	15 February 1999	list
(53167) 1999 CJ_{10}	15 February 1999	list
(53248) 1999 DA_{3}	21 February 1999	list
(53433) 1999 VV_{10}	9 November 1999	list
(53434) 1999 VD_{25}	13 November 1999	list
(53438) 1999 WY_{9}	30 November 1999	list
(53439) 1999 WA_{10}	30 November 1999	list
(53448) 1999 XT_{105}	11 December 1999	list
(53549) 2000 BN_{14}	28 January 2000	list
(53553) 2000 CB_{2}	2 February 2000	list
(53633) 2000 DQ	24 February 2000	list
(55813) 1994 VQ_{2}	8 November 1994	list
(55814) 1994 YD	24 December 1994	list
(55857) 1996 XU_{2}	2 December 1996	list
(55876) 1997 VH_{3}	6 November 1997	list
(55879) 1997 WG	18 November 1997	list
(55881) 1997 WU_{1}	19 November 1997	list
(55893) 1997 YL	20 December 1997	list
(55895) 1998 AP	5 January 1998	list
(56010) 1998 UJ_{8}	24 October 1998	list
(56039) 1998 XO_{3}	9 December 1998	list
(56040) 1998 XP_{3}	9 December 1998	list
(56070) 1998 YQ_{5}	21 December 1998	list
(56072) 1998 YK_{8}	24 December 1998	list
(56078) 1999 AT	7 January 1999	list
(56079) 1999 AS_{2}	9 January 1999	list
(56090) 1999 BE	16 January 1999	list
(56091) 1999 BJ	16 January 1999	list
(56092) 1999 BK	16 January 1999	list
(56110) 1999 CO_{1}	7 February 1999	list
(56113) 1999 CQ_{5}	12 February 1999	list
(56193) 1999 GN_{1}	8 April 1999	list
(56367) 2000 EF	1 March 2000	list
(56403) 2000 FL	25 March 2000	list
(57810) 2001 WC	16 November 2001	list
(58287) 1994 AE_{1}	7 January 1994	list
(58332) 1994 UR	31 October 1994	list
(58336) 1994 VP	1 November 1994	list
(58337) 1994 WV	25 November 1994	list
(58340) 1994 YO_{1}	31 December 1994	list
(58341) 1994 YP_{1}	31 December 1994	list
(58342) 1994 YR_{1}	31 December 1994	list
(58391) 1995 UV_{3}	20 October 1995	list
(58404) 1995 WJ_{7}	27 November 1995	list
(58408) 1995 XU	12 December 1995	list

(58412) 1995 YX_{2}	26 December 1995	list
(58415) 1996 AM	11 January 1996	list
(58416) 1996 BT_{1}	23 January 1996	list
(58509) 1996 XB_{1}	2 December 1996	list
(58517) 1997 AJ	2 January 1997	list
(58518) 1997 AC_{2}	3 January 1997	list
(58519) 1997 AU_{2}	3 January 1997	list
(58523) 1997 BU	27 January 1997	list
(58529) 1997 CX	1 February 1997	list
(58610) 1997 UN_{3}	26 October 1997	list
(58623) 1997 VZ_{1}	1 November 1997	list
(58624) 1997 VC_{2}	1 November 1997	list
(58630) 1997 WC	18 November 1997	list
(58631) 1997 WE_{2}	23 November 1997	list
(58632) 1997 WM_{2}	23 November 1997	list
(58633) 1997 WY_{2}	23 November 1997	list
(58634) 1997 WF_{3}	23 November 1997	list
(58660) 1997 XR	3 December 1997	list
(58661) 1997 XU	3 December 1997	list
(58666) 1997 YJ_{2}	21 December 1997	list
(58670) 1997 YA_{6}	25 December 1997	list
(58675) 1997 YD_{14}	31 December 1997	list
(58685) 1998 BP	18 January 1998	list
(58686) 1998 BB_{1}	19 January 1998	list
(58693) 1998 BG_{25}	28 January 1998	list
(58706) 1998 CD	1 February 1998	list
(59057) 1998 UO_{18}	25 October 1998	list
(59086) 1998 VJ_{31}	14 November 1998	list
(59116) 1998 XL_{3}	9 December 1998	list
(59117) 1998 XQ_{3}	9 December 1998	list
(59156) 1998 YC_{3}	17 December 1998	list
(59157) 1998 YC_{4}	19 December 1998	list
(59160) 1998 YF_{8}	24 December 1998	list
(59163) 1998 YX_{11}	26 December 1998	list
(59164) 1998 YG_{12}	27 December 1998	list
(59171) 1999 AP_{2}	9 January 1999	list
(59173) 1999 AC_{5}	11 January 1999	list
(59174) 1999 AT_{5}	12 January 1999	list
(59178) 1999 AF_{8}	13 January 1999	list
(59179) 1999 AG_{8}	13 January 1999	list
(59225) 1999 CC	4 February 1999	list
(59226) 1999 CE	4 February 1999	list
(59227) 1999 CG	4 February 1999	list
(59228) 1999 CH	4 February 1999	list
(59229) 1999 CQ	5 February 1999	list
(59230) 1999 CY	5 February 1999	list
(59231) 1999 CZ	5 February 1999	list
(59233) 1999 CH_{1}	6 February 1999	list
(59234) 1999 CR_{1}	7 February 1999	list
(59235) 1999 CV_{1}	7 February 1999	list

(59236) 1999 CD_{2}	8 February 1999	list
(59418) 1999 GJ_{1}	7 April 1999	list
(60004) 1999 TC_{13}	10 October 1999	list
(60176) 1999 VY_{5}	5 November 1999	list
(60182) 1999 VS_{10}	9 November 1999	list
(60188) 1999 VH_{25}	13 November 1999	list
(60255) 1999 WO_{4}	28 November 1999	list
(60281) 1999 XF_{95}	7 December 1999	list
(63230) 2001 BT_{14}	21 January 2001	list
(63231) 2001 BA_{15}	21 January 2001	list
(63232) 2001 BK_{15}	21 January 2001	list
(63289) 2001 DJ_{81}	26 February 2001	list
(64967) 2002 AV_{1}	6 January 2002	list
(64970) 2002 AJ_{5}	9 January 2002	list
(65766) 1994 WG_{1}	27 November 1994	list
(65792) 1995 WJ_{1}	18 November 1995	list
(65796) 1995 XK_{1}	15 December 1995	list
(65797) 1995 YL	19 December 1995	list
(65802) 1996 BA_{3}	27 January 1996	list
(65832) 1996 XN_{5}	7 December 1996	list
(65833) 1996 XE_{6}	7 December 1996	list
(65840) 1997 AA_{4}	6 January 1997	list
(65846) 1997 BT_{2}	30 January 1997	list
(65877) 1997 XK_{1}	4 December 1997	list
(65878) 1997 XD_{10}	5 December 1997	list
(65879) 1997 YC_{2}	21 December 1997	list
(65881) 1997 YO_{5}	25 December 1997	list
(65883) 1997 YX_{13}	31 December 1997	list
(65886) 1998 AM	5 January 1998	list
(65891) 1998 BQ_{24}	28 January 1998	list
(65893) 1998 BY_{33}	31 January 1998	list
(66145) 1998 TM	10 October 1998	list
(66163) 1998 VB	7 November 1998	list
(66848) 1999 VX_{5}	5 November 1999	list
(66936) 1999 WD_{5}	28 November 1999	list
(66945) 1999 XA_{1}	2 December 1999	list
(66986) 1999 XH_{95}	7 December 1999	list
(66987) 1999 XU_{95}	9 December 1999	list
(67269) 2000 FF_{5}	29 March 2000	list
(68147) 2001 AW_{44}	15 January 2001	list
(68148) 2001 AG_{45}	15 January 2001	list
(68152) 2001 BO	17 January 2001	list
(68153) 2001 BV	17 January 2001	list
(68158) 2001 BV_{14}	21 January 2001	list
(68159) 2001 BJ_{15}	21 January 2001	list
(68185) 2001 BX_{50}	28 January 2001	list
(68584) 2002 AT_{3}	8 January 2002	list
(69375) 1994 VG_{1}	4 November 1994	list
(69376) 1994 WR_{1}	27 November 1994	list
(69380) 1994 YK_{2}	31 December 1994	list

(69381) 1995 BH	23 January 1995	list
(69413) 1995 VA	1 November 1995	list
(69420) 1995 YA_{1}	21 December 1995	list
(69464) 1996 VV_{4}	13 November 1996	list
(69465) 1996 VR_{5}	14 November 1996	list
(69466) 1996 VZ_{5}	15 November 1996	list
(69471) 1996 XM_{1}	2 December 1996	list
(69472) 1996 XN_{1}	2 December 1996	list
(69473) 1996 XO_{1}	2 December 1996	list
(69474) 1996 XA_{3}	3 December 1996	list
(69480) 1996 XL_{19}	8 December 1996	list
(69481) 1996 XU_{19}	11 December 1996	list
(69483) 1996 XA_{31}	14 December 1996	list
(69485) 1997 AD	2 January 1997	list
(69487) 1997 AZ_{2}	4 January 1997	list
(69489) 1997 AB_{4}	6 January 1997	list
(69492) 1997 AG_{7}	9 January 1997	list
(69494) 1997 AF_{15}	13 January 1997	list
(69495) 1997 AY_{17}	15 January 1997	list
(69497) 1997 BK_{2}	30 January 1997	list
(69498) 1997 CM_{1}	1 February 1997	list
(69504) 1997 CG_{20}	12 February 1997	list
(69506) 1997 CF_{26}	14 February 1997	list
(69508) 1997 ET_{2}	4 March 1997	list
(69561) 1997 YD_{2}	21 December 1997	list
(69563) 1997 YP_{10}	28 December 1997	list
(69566) 1998 BX	19 January 1998	list
(69567) 1998 BC_{8}	25 January 1998	list
(69570) 1998 BT_{24}	28 January 1998	list
(69571) 1998 BJ_{25}	28 January 1998	list
(69572) 1998 BY_{25}	29 January 1998	list
(69595) 1998 FK_{11}	22 March 1998	list
(69917) 1998 TF	10 October 1998	list
(69959) 1998 VM_{31}	14 November 1998	list
(69970) 1998 WV	17 November 1998	list
(70014) 1998 YL_{3}	17 December 1998	list
(70019) 1998 YE_{12}	27 December 1998	list
(70021) 1999 AB	3 January 1999	list
(70029) 1999 CB	4 February 1999	list
(70731) 1999 VA_{6}	5 November 1999	list
(70732) 1999 VG_{6}	5 November 1999	list
(70736) 1999 VM_{10}	9 November 1999	list
(70751) 1999 VZ_{24}	13 November 1999	list
(70752) 1999 VB_{25}	13 November 1999	list
(70935) 1999 WG	16 November 1999	list
(70938) 1999 WZ_{3}	28 November 1999	list
(70944) 1999 WX_{9}	30 November 1999	list
(70945) 1999 WB_{10}	30 November 1999	list
(70946) 1999 WD_{10}	30 November 1999	list
(70996) 1999 XY_{35}	6 December 1999	list

(70997) 1999 XE_{36}	6 December 1999	list
(70998) 1999 XH_{36}	6 December 1999	list
(71056) 1999 XY_{95}	9 December 1999	list
(71065) 1999 XY_{105}	11 December 1999	list
(71218) 1999 YF_{5}	27 December 1999	list
(71222) 1999 YQ_{9}	31 December 1999	list
(71234) 2000 AE_{2}	3 January 2000	list
(71469) 2000 BQ_{14}	28 January 2000	list
(71470) 2000 BV_{14}	31 January 2000	list
(71547) 2000 DB_{3}	27 February 2000	list
(72211) 2001 AS	2 January 2001	list
(72212) 2001 AT	2 January 2001	list
(72213) 2001 AU	2 January 2001	list
(72273) 2001 AR_{44}	15 January 2001	list
(72274) 2001 AB_{45}	15 January 2001	list
(72275) 2001 AE_{45}	15 January 2001	list
(72279) 2001 BT	17 January 2001	list
(72289) 2001 BW_{14}	21 January 2001	list
(72290) 2001 BQ_{15}	21 January 2001	list
(72421) 2001 CF_{36}	15 February 2001	list
(72516) 2001 DC_{81}	26 February 2001	list
(72517) 2001 DK_{81}	26 February 2001	list
(73752) 1994 AD_{1}	7 January 1994	list
(73784) 1994 VP_{2}	8 November 1994	list
(73785) 1994 WJ_{1}	27 November 1994	list
(73786) 1994 WX_{2}	30 November 1994	list
(73788) 1995 AB_{1}	6 January 1995	list
(73820) 1995 WR_{8}	29 November 1995	list
(73824) 1995 YK_{1}	21 December 1995	list
(73825) 1995 YQ_{1}	22 December 1995	list
(73833) 1996 CP_{2}	12 February 1996	list
(73859) 1996 XK_{5}	7 December 1996	list
(73860) 1996 XR_{5}	7 December 1996	list
(73861) 1996 XN_{19}	8 December 1996	list
(73864) 1996 YS_{2}	29 December 1996	list
(73865) 1997 AW	2 January 1997	list
(73866) 1997 AB_{1}	2 January 1997	list
(73873) 1997 BF_{1}	28 January 1997	list
(73874) 1997 BX_{1}	29 January 1997	list
(73876) 1997 CT	1 February 1997	list
(73881) 1997 CD_{22}	13 February 1997	list
(73882) 1997 CZ_{25}	11 February 1997	list
(73884) 1997 EG	1 March 1997	list
(73940) 1997 SX_{10}	27 September 1997	list
(73958) 1997 WN	18 November 1997	list
(73960) 1997 WE_{21}	23 November 1997	list
(73971) 1998 BN_{8}	25 January 1998	list
(74403) 1998 YR_{5}	21 December 1998	list
(74410) 1999 AX_{4}	11 January 1999	list
(74412) 1999 AZ_{7}	13 January 1999	list

(74427) 1999 BU_{2}	18 January 1999	list
(74437) 1999 CR	5 February 1999	list
(74438) 1999 CT	5 February 1999	list
(74502) 1999 DG_{2}	19 February 1999	list
(75059) 1999 VU_{5}	5 November 1999	list
(75060) 1999 VJ_{6}	5 November 1999	list
(75064) 1999 VF_{10}	9 November 1999	list
(75065) 1999 VO_{10}	9 November 1999	list
(75081) 1999 VC_{25}	13 November 1999	list
(75227) 1999 WT_{3}	28 November 1999	list
(75228) 1999 WB_{4}	28 November 1999	list
(75229) 1999 WV_{4}	28 November 1999	list
(75230) 1999 WX_{4}	28 November 1999	list
(75231) 1999 WZ_{4}	28 November 1999	list
(75239) 1999 WZ_{9}	30 November 1999	list
(75248) 1999 XX	2 December 1999	list
(75258) 1999 XE_{8}	3 December 1999	list
(75390) 1999 XN_{95}	7 December 1999	list
(75410) 1999 XW_{104}	10 December 1999	list
(75813) 2000 BK_{3}	27 January 2000	list
(75814) 2000 BX_{3}	27 January 2000	list
(75822) 2000 BH_{15}	31 January 2000	list
(75982) 2000 DU	24 February 2000	list
(75983) 2000 DY	24 February 2000	list
(75985) 2000 DY_{2}	24 February 2000	list
(75989) 2000 DF_{7}	29 February 2000	list
(76123) 2000 EE	1 March 2000	list
(76629) 2000 HG	23 April 2000	list
(76934) 2001 AS_{44}	15 January 2001	list
(76935) 2001 AY_{44}	15 January 2001	list
(76937) 2001 BA_{1}	17 January 2001	list
(76943) 2001 BS_{14}	21 January 2001	list
(76944) 2001 BH_{15}	21 January 2001	list
(76970) 2001 BY_{50}	28 January 2001	list
(76971) 2001 BA_{51}	28 January 2001	list
(77038) 2001 CD_{36}	15 February 2001	list
(77054) 2001 DG_{7}	16 February 2001	list
(77119) 2001 DB_{81}	26 February 2001	list
(77120) 2001 DL_{81}	26 February 2001	list
(79258) 1995 DP_{1}	22 February 1995	list
(79291) 1995 UG_{6}	27 October 1995	list
(79350) 1996 YW	20 December 1996	list
(79362) 1997 EO_{2}	4 March 1997	list
(79448) 1997 WS_{3}	23 November 1997	list
(79458) 1997 YM	20 December 1997	list
(79459) 1997 YS	20 December 1997	list
(79460) 1997 YG_{2}	21 December 1997	list
(79795) 1998 VW_{6}	12 November 1998	list
(79825) 1998 WT_{1}	18 November 1998	list
(79866) 1998 YY	16 December 1998	list

(79868) 1998 YA_{4}	19 December 1998	list
(79892) 1999 BQ_{2}	18 January 1999	list
(79895) 1999 BF_{5}	20 January 1999	list
(79911) 1999 CK	4 February 1999	list
(79979) 1999 DQ_{2}	19 February 1999	list
(80245) 1999 WM_{4}	28 November 1999	list
(80250) 1999 WW_{9}	30 November 1999	list
(80256) 1999 XD_{1}	2 December 1999	list
(80283) 1999 XF_{36}	6 December 1999	list
(80335) 1999 XG_{95}	7 December 1999	list
(80453) 2000 AO_{2}	3 January 2000	list
(80655) 2000 BO_{3}	27 January 2000	list
(80666) 2000 BP_{14}	28 January 2000	list
(80667) 2000 BA_{15}	31 January 2000	list
(80668) 2000 BD_{15}	31 January 2000	list
(80824) 2000 DX	24 February 2000	list
(80825) 2000 DZ	24 February 2000	list
(80835) 2000 DK_{7}	29 February 2000	list
(82091) 2001 DE_{81}	26 February 2001	list
(85265) 1993 VR	14 November 1993	list
(85302) 1994 VM	1 November 1994	list
(85303) 1994 VN_{1}	4 November 1994	list
(85304) 1994 VS_{1}	3 November 1994	list
(85307) 1994 WN	25 November 1994	list
(85312) 1994 YB_{1}	28 December 1994	list
(85313) 1994 YU_{1}	31 December 1994	list
(85315) 1995 BE	20 January 1995	list
(85424) 1997 AA_{3}	4 January 1997	list
(85427) 1997 AE_{13}	11 January 1997	list
(85505) 1997 UU_{3}	26 October 1997	list
(85518) 1997 VC_{3}	6 November 1997	list
(85520) 1997 WO_{2}	23 November 1997	list
(85521) 1997 WW_{2}	23 November 1997	list
(85546) 1997 XH_{1}	3 December 1997	list
(85549) 1997 YH	18 December 1997	list
(85550) 1997 YW	20 December 1997	list
(85551) 1997 YZ_{1}	21 December 1997	list
(85552) 1997 YR_{7}	28 December 1997	list
(85553) 1997 YK_{10}	28 December 1997	list
(85554) 1997 YF_{14}	31 December 1997	list
(85555) 1997 YG_{14}	31 December 1997	list
(85560) 1998 BN	18 January 1998	list
(85806) 1998 WG_{8}	25 November 1998	list
(85842) 1998 YK_{7}	22 December 1998	list
(85849) 1999 AW	7 January 1999	list
(85850) 1999 AR_{2}	9 January 1999	list
(85851) 1999 AS_{4}	11 January 1999	list
(85852) 1999 AA_{5}	11 January 1999	list
(85863) 1999 BG	16 January 1999	list
(85874) 1999 CJ_{4}	9 February 1999	list

(85875) 1999 CR_{5}	12 February 1999	list
(85967) 1999 GK_{1}	7 April 1999	list
(86351) 1999 XS_{105}	11 December 1999	list
(89400) 2001 WB	16 November 2001	list
(89402) 2001 WG_{4}	19 November 2001	list
(89487) 2001 XU_{31}	14 December 2001	list
(89737) 2002 AW_{3}	8 January 2002	list
(89738) 2002 AO_{5}	9 January 2002	list
(90802) 1994 WY	25 November 1994	list
(90839) 1995 WN_{7}	27 November 1995	list
(90846) 1996 DY	21 February 1996	list
(90876) 1996 VW_{4}	13 November 1996	list
(90879) 1996 WB_{1}	19 November 1996	list
(90885) 1996 YR_{2}	29 December 1996	list
(90887) 1997 AH_{2}	3 January 1997	list
(90888) 1997 AB_{3}	4 January 1997	list
(90890) 1997 AT_{12}	10 January 1997	list
(90891) 1997 AE_{15}	13 January 1997	list
(90898) 1997 CQ_{19}	11 February 1997	list
(90948) 1997 VF_{4}	6 November 1997	list
(90950) 1997 VH_{5}	8 November 1997	list
(90954) 1997 WW_{1}	19 November 1997	list
(90956) 1997 WB_{3}	23 November 1997	list
(90989) 1997 YP	20 December 1997	list
(90997) 1998 BC	16 January 1998	list
(90998) 1998 BU	19 January 1998	list
(91216) 1999 AU_{3}	10 January 1999	list
(91217) 1999 AM_{4}	11 January 1999	list
(91220) 1999 AA_{8}	13 January 1999	list
(91224) 1999 BH	16 January 1999	list
(91234) 1999 CN_{1}	7 February 1999	list
(91235) 1999 CQ_{1}	7 February 1999	list
(91597) 1999 TB_{13}	10 October 1999	list
(91891) 1999 VJ_{2}	5 November 1999	list
(91895) 1999 VV_{5}	5 November 1999	list
(92210) 2000 AH_{2}	3 January 2000	list
(92262) 2000 BZ_{14}	31 January 2000	list
(92269) 2000 CM_{2}	2 February 2000	list
(94189) 2001 BU	17 January 2001	list
(94190) 2001 BY	17 January 2001	list
(94196) 2001 BQ_{14}	21 January 2001	list
(94197) 2001 BB_{15}	21 January 2001	list
(94198) 2001 BL_{15}	21 January 2001	list
(94302) 2001 EY_{15}	15 March 2001	list
(94622) 2001 WL_{1}	17 November 2001	list
(95006) 2002 AQ	5 January 2002	list
(95007) 2002 AR	5 January 2002	list
(95010) 2002 AR_{1}	6 January 2002	list
(95011) 2002 AS_{1}	6 January 2002	list
(95012) 2002 AT_{1}	6 January 2002	list

(95013) 2002 AU_{1}	6 January 2002	list
(95015) 2002 AS_{3}	8 January 2002	list
(96277) 1995 WN_{4}	20 November 1995	list
(96317) 1997 BW_{2}	30 January 1997	list
(96318) 1997 CN_{1}	1 February 1997	list
(96322) 1997 CN_{20}	12 February 1997	list
(96323) 1997 CE_{26}	14 February 1997	list
(96324) 1997 EV_{2}	4 March 1997	list
(96352) 1997 VH_{2}	1 November 1997	list
(96353) 1997 VF_{3}	6 November 1997	list
(96354) 1997 VO_{3}	6 November 1997	list
(96373) 1997 YH_{7}	27 December 1997	list
(96374) 1997 YZ_{13}	31 December 1997	list
(96376) 1998 AY	5 January 1998	list
(96378) 1998 BA	16 January 1998	list
(96380) 1998 BG_{1}	19 January 1998	list
(96385) 1998 BC_{25}	28 January 1998	list
(97062) 1999 VZ_{5}	5 November 1999	list
(97185) 1999 WR_{4}	28 November 1999	list
(97200) 1999 XK_{8}	3 December 1999	list
(97451) 2000 CA	1 February 2000	list
(98862) 2001 AN_{44}	15 January 2001	list
(98875) 2001 BN_{15}	21 January 2001	list
(98901) 2001 BB_{51}	28 January 2001	list
(98957) 2001 CH_{36}	15 February 2001	list
(99052) 2001 ET_{15}	15 March 2001	list
(99053) 2001 EU_{15}	15 March 2001	list
(99054) 2001 EV_{15}	15 March 2001	list
(99390) 2002 AP_{1}	6 January 2002	list
(100173) 1993 XZ	11 December 1993	list
(100270) 1994 VQ	1 November 1994	list
(100271) 1994 VP_{1}	3 November 1994	list
(100273) 1994 WO_{1}	27 November 1994	list
(100278) 1994 YN	28 December 1994	list
(100280) 1995 BQ_{1}	26 January 1995	list
(100359) 1995 UK_{8}	27 October 1995	list
(100377) 1995 VH	1 November 1995	list
(100387) 1995 WJ_{4}	20 November 1995	list
(100388) 1995 WW_{7}	28 November 1995	list
(100403) 1996 AD	1 January 1996	list
(100404) 1996 AC_{1}	12 January 1996	list
(100481) 1996 UJ_{1}	20 October 1996	list
(100516) 1997 BA	16 January 1997	list
(100518) 1997 BL	16 January 1997	list
(100520) 1997 BU_{2}	30 January 1997	list
(100532) 1997 CB_{17}	6 February 1997	list
(100628) 1997 UX_{3}	26 October 1997	list
(100639) 1997 VV_{3}	6 November 1997	list
(100643) 1997 VZ_{5}	9 November 1997	list
(100646) 1997 WR	19 November 1997	list

(100647) 1997 WS_{2}	23 November 1997	list
(100648) 1997 WZ_{2}	23 November 1997	list
(100660) 1997 WL_{21}	30 November 1997	list
(100673) 1997 XY	3 December 1997	list
(100685) 1997 YH_{2}	21 December 1997	list
(100686) 1997 YA_{3}	24 December 1997	list
(100688) 1997 YU_{5}	25 December 1997	list
(100692) 1997 YJ_{7}	27 December 1997	list
(100696) 1997 YJ_{14}	31 December 1997	list
(100701) 1998 AC_{1}	5 January 1998	list
(100718) 1998 BR_{24}	28 January 1998	list
(100745) 1998 ET_{3}	2 March 1998	list
(101452) 1998 WS_{1}	18 November 1998	list
(101553) 1999 AB_{4}	10 January 1999	list
(101555) 1999 AO_{5}	12 January 1999	list
(101556) 1999 AW_{5}	12 January 1999	list
(101558) 1999 AE_{8}	13 January 1999	list
(101572) 1999 BF	16 January 1999	list
(101577) 1999 BV_{2}	18 January 1999	list
(101587) 1999 BE_{12}	22 January 1999	list
(101602) 1999 CT_{1}	7 February 1999	list
(101603) 1999 CB_{2}	8 February 1999	list
(101611) 1999 CL_{8}	13 February 1999	list
(101618) 1999 CN_{9}	14 February 1999	list
(101712) 1999 DU_{2}	20 February 1999	list
(102604) 1999 VW_{5}	5 November 1999	list
(102863) 1999 WL_{3}	28 November 1999	list
(102864) 1999 WA_{4}	28 November 1999	list
(102865) 1999 WD_{4}	28 November 1999	list
(102866) 1999 WA_{5}	28 November 1999	list
(102927) 1999 XX_{35}	6 December 1999	list
(102999) 1999 XP_{95}	7 December 1999	list
(103000) 1999 XT_{95}	9 December 1999	list
(103001) 1999 XW_{95}	9 December 1999	list
(103018) 1999 XW_{105}	11 December 1999	list
(103241) 2000 AK_{2}	3 January 2000	list
(103513) 2000 BM_{3}	27 January 2000	list
(103533) 2000 BS_{14}	28 January 2000	list
(103769) 2000 DV	24 February 2000	list
(103782) 2000 DJ_{7}	29 February 2000	list
(106843) 2000 YV_{12}	25 December 2000	list
(107135) 2001 BH	17 January 2001	list
(107136) 2001 BQ	17 January 2001	list
(107137) 2001 BW	17 January 2001	list
(107156) 2001 BF_{15}	21 January 2001	list
(107157) 2001 BR_{15}	21 January 2001	list
(107158) 2001 BU_{15}	21 January 2001	list
(107224) 2001 BZ_{50}	28 January 2001	list
(107376) 2001 CG_{36}	15 February 2001	list
(107377) 2001 CL_{36}	15 February 2001	list

(107426) 2001 DL_{13}	19 February 2001	list
(107427) 2001 DM_{13}	19 February 2001	list
(107428) 2001 DP_{13}	19 February 2001	list
(107429) 2001 DQ_{13}	19 February 2001	list
(107430) 2001 DU_{13}	19 February 2001	list
(107517) 2001 DM_{54}	19 February 2001	list
(107556) 2001 DF_{81}	26 February 2001	list
(107643) 2001 EY_{17}	15 March 2001	list
(111182) 2001 WF_{4}	19 November 2001	list
(118232) 1997 AY_{6}	9 January 1997	list
(118252) 1998 BW_{33}	31 January 1998	list
(118331) 1999 AM_{2}	9 January 1999	list
(118338) 1999 CS	5 February 1999	list
(119030) 2001 DO_{8}	16 February 2001	list
(119772) 2002 AV_{3}	8 January 2002	list
(119773) 2002 AB_{11}	11 January 2002	list
(120544) 1994 WK	25 November 1994	list
(120545) 1994 WS	25 November 1994	list
(120548) 1995 BO	23 January 1995	list
(120672) 1997 AK	2 January 1997	list
(120715) 1997 SG_{4}	27 September 1997	list
(120737) 1997 TL_{17}	8 October 1997	list
(120743) 1997 VN_{5}	8 November 1997	list
(120751) 1997 WH_{21}	30 November 1997	list
(121033) 1999 CU	5 February 1999	list
(121034) 1999 CF_{1}	6 February 1999	list
(121105) 1999 GL_{1}	7 April 1999	list
(121884) 2000 DA_{3}	27 February 2000	list
(123771) 2001 BL	17 January 2001	list
(123781) 2001 BU_{14}	21 January 2001	list
(123782) 2001 BM_{15}	21 January 2001	list
(123865) 2001 DK_{7}	16 February 2001	list
(123868) 2001 DJ_{13}	19 February 2001	list
(123869) 2001 DR_{13}	19 February 2001	list
(123951) 2001 FC_{4}	18 March 2001	list
(125460) 2001 WS_{5}	22 November 2001	list
(125589) 2001 XS_{31}	14 December 2001	list
(125590) 2001 XT_{31}	14 December 2001	list
(126164) 2002 AO_{1}	6 January 2002	list
(126165) 2002 AX_{3}	8 January 2002	list
(126167) 2002 AL_{5}	9 January 2002	list
(129496) 1995 EK	5 March 1995	list
(129556) 1996 VY_{5}	15 November 1996	list
(129557) 1996 XA_{1}	2 December 1996	list
(129559) 1996 YH	20 December 1996	list
(129598) 1997 VL_{3}	6 November 1997	list
(129610) 1998 AA_{1}	5 January 1998	list
(129613) 1998 BR_{6}	24 January 1998	list
(129614) 1998 BB_{25}	28 January 1998	list
(129669) 1998 RY	12 September 1998	list

(129735) 1998 YU	16 December 1998	list
(129996) 1999 VF_{25}	13 November 1999	list
(130125) 1999 XV_{105}	11 December 1999	list
(131115) 2001 BN	17 January 2001	list
(131116) 2001 BS	17 January 2001	list
(131138) 2001 BV_{50}	28 January 2001	list
(131171) 2001 CO_{36}	15 February 2001	list
(131192) 2001 DN_{7}	16 February 2001	list
(131244) 2001 FD	18 March 2001	list
(131584) 2001 WT_{5}	22 November 2001	list
(131754) 2002 AO	5 January 2002	list
(131755) 2002 AN_{1}	6 January 2002	list
(131756) 2002 AQ_{1}	6 January 2002	list
(131772) 2002 AV_{18}	13 January 2002	list
(131773) 2002 AW_{18}	13 January 2002	list
(135485) 2001 XH_{1}	8 December 2001	list
(136638) 1995 BE_{1}	25 January 1995	list
(136744) 1995 WP_{7}	27 November 1995	list
(136784) 1996 WT_{1}	30 November 1996	list
(136792) 1997 AU_{16}	14 January 1997	list
(136797) 1997 CF_{1}	1 February 1997	list
(136826) 1997 SM_{4}	27 September 1997	list
(136836) 1997 VO_{5}	8 November 1997	list
(136843) 1997 YX_{5}	25 December 1997	list
(137020) 1998 TL	10 October 1998	list
(137106) 1999 AQ_{5}	12 January 1999	list
(137653) 1999 XY	2 December 1999	list
(137890) 2000 AZ_{146}	4 January 2000	list
(137913) 2000 BH_{3}	27 January 2000	list
(138026) 2000 DR	24 February 2000	list
(138926) 2001 BA	16 January 2001	list
(138927) 2001 BR	17 January 2001	list
(138985) 2001 DP_{7}	16 February 2001	list
(139062) 2001 FD_{4}	19 March 2001	list
(145723) 1993 YT	21 December 1993	list
(145731) 1995 AU	5 January 1995	list
(145771) 1997 VD_{2}	1 November 1997	list
(147984) 1995 WO_{4}	20 November 1995	list
(150122) 1994 CC_{2}	12 February 1994	list
(150135) 1995 UH_{8}	27 October 1995	list
(150167) 1997 XB_{1}	3 December 1997	list
(152650) 1997 VR_{5}	8 November 1997	list
(153245) 2001 BK	17 January 2001	list
(155848) 2001 AO_{44}	15 January 2001	list
(157830) 1997 YE	18 December 1997	list
(157831) 1998 BR_{10}	25 January 1998	list
(159613) 2002 AX_{18}	13 January 2002	list
(160555) 1998 RB_{1}	12 September 1998	list
(160855) 2001 DH_{81}	26 February 2001	list
(160940) 2002 AK_{5}	9 January 2002	list

(162216) 1999 TD_{13}	10 October 1999	list
(162805) 2001 AR	2 January 2001	list
(162824) 2001 BK_{60}	29 January 2001	list
(162838) 2001 CC_{36}	15 February 2001	list
(162842) 2001 DQ_{7}	16 February 2001	list
(162843) 2001 DN_{13}	19 February 2001	list
(163068) 2002 AP_{5}	9 January 2002	list
(164905) 1999 WU_{9}	30 November 1999	list
(165477) 2001 AP_{44}	15 January 2001	list
(165482) 2001 BC	17 January 2001	list
(165566) 2001 DA_{81}	26 February 2001	list
(168621) 2000 CD_{2}	2 February 2000	list
(168954) 2001 AT_{44}	15 January 2001	list
(168955) 2001 AV_{44}	15 January 2001	list
(169430) 2002 AH_{5}	9 January 2002	list
(171485) 1995 YZ_{2}	26 December 1995	list
(171497) 1997 BY_{2}	30 January 1997	list
(171773) 2001 BJ_{10}	17 January 2001	list
(171794) 2001 DM_{7}	16 February 2001	list
(173164) 1996 XZ_{18}	7 December 1996	list
(173166) 1997 BP_{2}	30 January 1997	list
(176110) 2001 DO_{7}	16 February 2001	list
(181856) 1998 XV_{3}	9 December 1998	list
(185786) 1999 VU_{24}	13 November 1999	list
(187792) 1999 AV_{3}	10 January 1999	list
(190444) 1999 YM_{9}	31 December 1999	list
(192397) 1996 XZ_{5}	7 December 1996	list
(192400) 1997 AG_{2}	3 January 1997	list
(192402) 1997 AW_{12}	10 January 1997	list
(192457) 1998 BM_{33}	31 January 1998	list
(192563) 1998 WZ_{6}	23 November 1998	list
(193574) 2001 BB	17 January 2001	list
(193575) 2001 BF	17 January 2001	list
(193576) 2001 BG	17 January 2001	list
(193587) 2001 BQ_{38}	23 January 2001	list
(193639) 2001 DK_{13}	19 February 2001	list
(194838) 2002 AU_{3}	8 January 2002	list
(194848) 2002 AU_{18}	13 January 2002	list
(200300) 2000 BK_{14}	28 January 2000	list
(202895) 1994 YP	28 December 1994	list
(202940) 1999 CD_{5}	12 February 1999	list
(203367) 2001 WO_{5}	19 November 2001	list
(205114) 1999 VQ_{8}	8 November 1999	list
(205390) 2001 DS_{13}	19 February 2001	list
(213242) 2001 BY_{14}	21 January 2001	list
(219201) 1999 VE_{6}	5 November 1999	list
(219292) 2000 DT	24 February 2000	list
(219476) 2001 CN_{36}	15 February 2001	list
(222577) 2001 WA	16 November 2001	list
(225621) 2001 BD	17 January 2001	list

(225631) 2001 ER_{15}	15 March 2001	list
(229943) 1998 TH	10 October 1998	list
(231716) 1999 BT_{2}	18 January 1999	list
(234000) 1996 XP_{13}	8 December 1996	list
(234333) 2001 EZ_{17}	15 March 2001	list
(239809) 1997 AY_{12}	10 January 1997	list
(243609) 1998 YY_{11}	26 December 1998	list
(246917) 1998 UR_{18}	25 October 1998	list
(247171) 2001 BD_{15}	21 January 2001	list
(250006) 2002 AT	5 January 2002	list
(252147) 2001 BP	17 January 2001	list
(252151) 2001 BZ_{14}	21 January 2001	list
(252664) 2002 AP	5 January 2002	list
(257536) 1998 EU_{3}	2 March 1998	list
(257572) 1999 CP_{1}	7 February 1999	list
(257731) 1999 YG_{5}	27 December 1999	list
(264462) 2001 DH_{7}	16 February 2001	list
(267037) 1997 YG	18 December 1997	list
(267038) 1997 YM_{2}	21 December 1997	list
(297289) 1997 WF	18 November 1997	list
(301945) 2000 BC_{15}	31 January 2000	list
(312942) 1995 EK_{1}	7 March 1995	list
(313146) 2001 DH_{13}	19 February 2001	list
(316719) 1997 YY_{13}	31 December 1997	list
(322751) 2001 BM	17 January 2001	list
(344065) 1995 UB_{4}	20 October 1995	list
(370063) 2001 BP_{38}	17 January 2001	list
(380272) 2002 AC_{11}	12 January 2002	list
(399319) 1997 YA_{14}	31 December 1997	list
Co-discovery made with:^{A} H. Fujii

== See also ==
- List of minor planet discoverers § T. Kobayashi
