= 7803 Adachi =

Stony Agnia asteroid

Discovery
- Discovered by: T. Kobayashi
- Discovery site: Ōizumi Obs.
- Discovery date: 4 March 1997

Designations
- Named after: Makoto Adachi (amateur astronomer)
- Alternative designations: 1997 EW_{2} · 1973 AA_{3} 1976 UY_{17} · 1978 EM_{1} 1992 CF_{2}
- Minor planet category: main-belt · (middle); Agnia

Orbital characteristics
- Epoch 23 March 2018 (JD 2458200.5)
- Uncertainty parameter 0
- Observation arc: 63.96 yr (23,363 d)
- Aphelion: 2.9253 AU
- Perihelion: 2.6459 AU
- Semi-major axis: 2.7856 AU
- Eccentricity: 0.0502
- Orbital period (sidereal): 4.65 yr (1,698 d)
- Mean anomaly: 239.11°
- Mean motion: 0° 12^{m} 43.2^{s} / day
- Inclination: 4.9969°
- Longitude of ascending node: 110.63°
- Argument of perihelion: 8.8759°

Physical characteristics
- Dimensions: 6.359±0.129 km 10.31 km (calculated)
- Synodic rotation period: 5.1966±0.0082 h
- Geometric albedo: 0.057 (assumed); 0.251±0.055
- Spectral type: S · C (generic)
- Absolute magnitude (H): 13.1 · 13.212±0.005 (R) · 13.3 · 13.65±0.27 · 13.66

7803 Adachi, provisional designation 1997 EW_{2}, is a stony Agnia asteroid from the middle region of the asteroid belt, approximately 6.4 kilometers (4 miles) in diameter. The asteroid was discovered on 4 March 1997, by Japanese amateur astronomer Takao Kobayashi at the Ōizumi Observatory in central Japan. It was named for Japanese amateur astronomer Makoto Adachi. The S-type asteroid has a rotation period of 5.2 hours.

== Orbit and classification ==
Adachi is a member of the Agnia family (514), a very large family of stony asteroids with more than 2000 known members. They most likely formed from the breakup of a basalt object, which in turn was spawned from a larger parent body that underwent igneous differentiation. The family's parent body and namesake is the asteroid 847 Agnia.

It orbits the Sun in the central asteroid belt at a distance of 2.6–2.9 AU once every 4 years and 8 months (1,698 days; semi-major axis of 2.79 AU). Its orbit has an eccentricity of 0.05 and an inclination of 5° with respect to the ecliptic. The first precovery was taken at the U.S. Palomar Observatory in 1953, extending the asteroid's observation arc by 44 years prior to it discovery.

== Physical characteristics ==
Adachi has been characterized as a stony S-type asteroid by Pan-STARRS photometric survey, which agrees with the Agnia family's overall spectral type.

=== Diameter and albedo ===
According to the survey carried out by the NEOWISE mission of NASA's Wide-field Infrared Survey Explorer, Adachi measures 6.359 kilometers in diameter and its surface has an albedo between 0.251 and 0.2513. The Collaborative Asteroid Lightcurve Link assumes a generic, carbonaceous albedo of 0.057 for all minor planets with a semi-major axis of more than 2.7 AU, and consequently calculates a larger diameter of 10.31 kilometers using an absolute magnitude of 13.66.

=== Rotation period ===
In August 2013, a rotational lightcurve of Adachi was obtained through photometric observations at the Palomar Transient Factory in California. It showed a period of 5.1966 hours with a brightness variation of 0.31 magnitude (U=2).

== Naming ==
This minor planet was named after Makoto Adachi (born 1953), Japanese amateur astronomer and elementary school teacher from Kyoto. He is the director of the Oriental Astronomical Association and a long-time direct observer of the Solar System's planets, especially Jupiter. The approved naming citation was published by the Minor Planet Center on 6 August 2003 (M.P.C. 49279).
