= 440P/Kobayashi =

Jupiter-family comet

P/1997 B1 (Kobayashi)
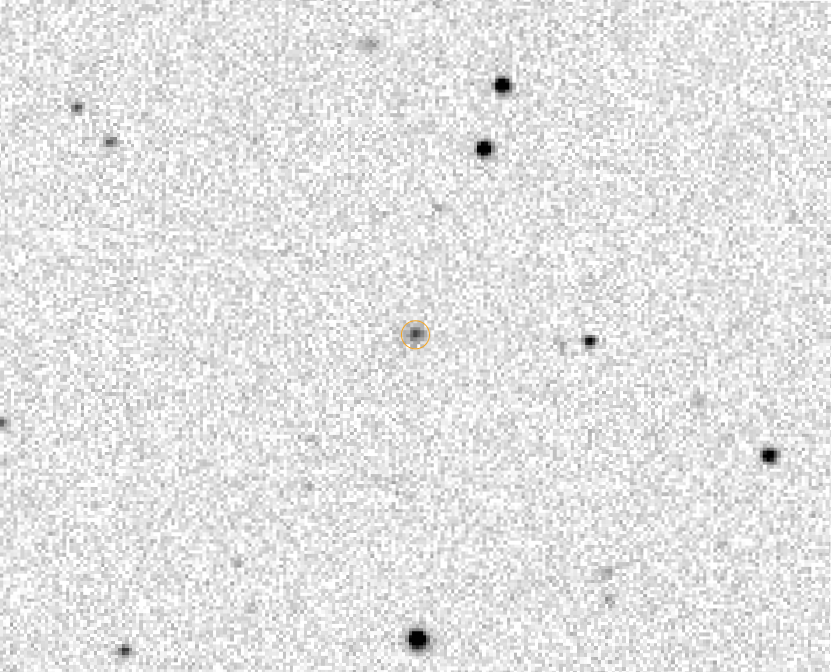

Discovery
- Discovered by: Takao Kobayashi
- Discovery date: January 30, 1997

Orbital characteristics
- Epoch: November 21, 2025 (2461000.5)
- Aphelion: 15.11 AU
- Perihelion: 2.051 AU
- Semi-major axis: 8.588 AU
- Eccentricity: 0.761
- Orbital period: 25.14 yr
- Inclination: 12.35°
- Last perihelion: March 29, 2022; March 2, 1997
- Next perihelion: June 5, 2047

440P/Kobayashi is a periodic comet with a 25-year orbital period, discovered by the Japanese amateur astronomer Takao Kobayashi on January 30, 1997. It was the first comet to be discovered by an amateur astronomer with the use of CCD. It last came to perihelion in 2022 and will next come to perihelion in 2047.

On January 30 and January 31, 1997, Takao Kobayashi observed an object, P/1997 B1 (Kobayashi), which was initially thought to be a minor planet and was reported to the IAU as such by S. Nakano. Over the next few days, the object was observed to be in a cometary orbit. W. Offutt later showed it to be a comet. For discovery of a comet with CCD, as well as the faintest discovery, Kobayashi ranks the first among amateur astronomers. It demonstrates that amateur astronomers still have an important role to play in the field of astronomical object discovery.

The comet was recovered on January 11, 2022, by the Purple Mountain Observatory. The comet was also spotted in images by Kitt Peak-Bok from November 29, 2021, and Pan STARRS from November 2021 and January 2022. In the latter the comet exhibited a very condensed coma and a tail measuring two arcseconds in length. It acquired the provisional designation P/2021 W2. Its last observation used was on February 22, 2022.

== See also ==
- List of Halley-type comets
