= C/1975 N1 (Kobayashi–Berger–Milon) =

Parabolic comet

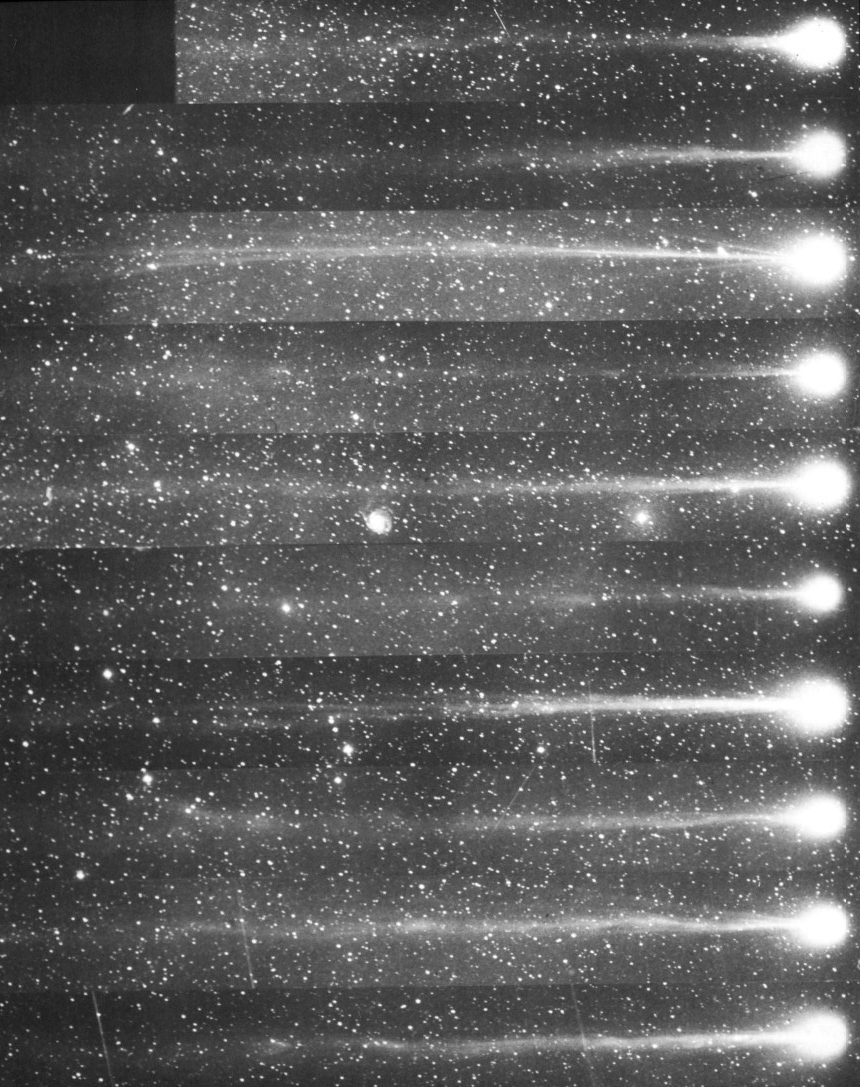
- Comet K–B–M photographed by NASA's Joint Observatory for Cometary Research (JOCR) program on 29 July–7 August 1975.

Discovery
- Discovered by: Toru Kobayashi; Douglas Berger; Dennis Milon
- Discovery date: 2 July 1975

Designations
- Alternative designations: 1975 IX, 1975h

Orbital characteristics
- Epoch: 9 August 1975 (JD 2442633.5)
- Observation arc: 178 days
- Number of observations: 390
- Perihelion: 0.426 AU
- Eccentricity: 1.00009
- Inclination: 80.781°
- Longitude of ascending node: 296.35°
- Argument of periapsis: 116.97°
- Last perihelion: 5 September 1975
- Earth MOID: 0.259 AU
- Jupiter MOID: 2.236 AU
- Comet total magnitude (M1): 7.9
- Comet nuclear magnitude (M2): 14.7

Comet Kobayashi–Berger–Milon, also known as C/1975 N1, is a non-periodic comet that was observed from July to December 1975. It was discovered by three astronomers from Japan (Toru Kobayashi) and the United States (Douglas Berger and Dennis Milon) respectively.
