= Meanings of minor-planet names: 70001–71000 =

As minor planet discoveries are confirmed, they are given a permanent number by the IAU's Minor Planet Center (MPC), and the discoverers can then submit names for them, following the IAU's naming conventions. The list below concerns those minor planets in the specified number-range that have received names, and explains the meanings of those names.

Official naming citations of newly named small Solar System bodies are approved and published in a bulletin by IAU's Working Group for Small Bodies Nomenclature (WGSBN). Before May 2021, citations were published in MPC's Minor Planet Circulars for many decades. Recent citations can also be found on the JPL Small-Body Database (SBDB). Until his death in 2016, German astronomer Lutz D. Schmadel compiled these citations into the Dictionary of Minor Planet Names (DMP) and regularly updated the collection.

Based on Paul Herget's The Names of the Minor Planets, Schmadel also researched the unclear origin of numerous asteroids, most of which had been named prior to World War II. This article incorporates text from this source, which is in the public domain: SBDB New namings may only be added to this list below after official publication as the preannouncement of names is condemned. The WGSBN publishes a comprehensive guideline for the naming rules of non-cometary small Solar System bodies.

== 70001–70100 ==
Named minor planet	Provisional	This minor planet was named for...	Ref · Catalog
70004 Richardgalli	1998 XF_{26}	Richard Galli (b.1970), a French amateur astronomer.	IAU · 70004
70030 Margaretmiller	1999 CZ_{1}	Margaret Joan Miller (born 1956), wife of American astronomer Brian Warner who discovered this minor planet. A graduate of Indiana University, she is an accomplished violist who, as a member of the DaVinci Quartet, was a prize winner in two major international competitions. She now devotes her time to teaching viola and violin to students of all ages (Src).	JPL · 70030

== 70101–70200 ==
back to top

Named minor planet	Provisional	This minor planet was named for...	Ref · Catalog
70179 Beppechiara	1999 QQ_{1}	Giuseppe Brenna (born 1952) and his wife Chiara Martinoni (born 1953), two Swiss alpinists who live in a small village in the Verzasca valley in the canton of Ticino. He has climbed to the top of all 630 mountains in Ticino of altitude greater than 2000 meters and has written several guides and books about Swiss mountains.	JPL · 70179

== 70201–70300 ==
back to top

Named minor planet	Provisional	This minor planet was named for...	Ref · Catalog
70207 Davidunlap	1999 RP_{33}	David Alexander Dunlap (1863–1924), born in Pembroke, Ontario, a mining magnate, philanthropist and amateur astronomer, was the namesake of the David Dunlap Observatory, location of Canada's largest optical telescope, and where the first black-hole candidate Cygnus X-1 was discovered and confirmed.	JPL · 70207
70210 Cesarelombardi	1999 RA_{37}	Cesare Lombardi (1900–1971) was a volunteer assistant at the Brera Astronomical Observatory in Milan from 1930, where he devoted himself to the observation and calculation of orbits of minor planets. From 1930 to 1941 and from 1949 to 1971 he was director of the Hoepli planetarium in Milan.	JPL · 70210

== 70301–70400 ==
back to top

Named minor planet	Provisional	This minor planet was named for...	Ref · Catalog
There are no named minor planets in this number range

== 70401–70500 ==
back to top

Named minor planet	Provisional	This minor planet was named for...	Ref · Catalog
70401 Davidbishop	1999 RH_{241}	David Bishop (born 1961) is an engineer who works with cutting-edge CMOS and other imaging technology. For many years he has donated his time and tirelessly maintained the only webpage that provides up-to-date reports and images of all supernova discoveries. This is used daily by hundreds of astronomers.	JPL · 70401
70409 Srnín	1999 SR_{2}	The Czech village of Srnín is situated at the foot of Kleť mountain. It was founded by Zlatá Koruna monastery and first mentioned in 1400.	JPL · 70409
70418 Kholopov	1999 SD_{12}	P. N. Kholopov (1922–1988) was the astronomer editor-in-chief of the first three volumes of the fourth edition of the General Catalogue of Variable Stars.	JPL · 70418
70444 Genovali	1999 TX_{11}	Katia Genovali (born 1978) is a young astrophysicist who works on cataclysmic and symbiotic variables at the University of Pisa. Apart from her astrophysical work she is very active in the public understanding of science and astronomy.	JPL · 70444
70446 Pugh	1999 TY_{13}	George Pugh (1926–), American physicist, first to propose (in 1959), a test of general relativity's frame dragging via a combination telescope/gyroscope in a drag-free satellite: Gravity Probe B (2004).	JPL · 70446
70449 Gruebel	1999 TK_{17}	Robert W. Gruebel (1924–2016) was a professor of physics at Stephen F. Austin State University, and a mentor, colleague and friend of the discoverer. (The minor planet was discovered at the university's observatory.)	JPL · 70449

== 70501–70600 ==
back to top

Named minor planet	Provisional	This minor planet was named for...	Ref · Catalog
There are no named minor planets in this number range

== 70601–70700 ==
back to top

Named minor planet	Provisional	This minor planet was named for...	Ref · Catalog
70679 Urzidil	1999 UV_{3}	Johannes Urzidil, Czech-German writer, poet and journalist † ‡	MPC · 70679

== 70701–70800 ==
back to top

Named minor planet	Provisional	This minor planet was named for...	Ref · Catalog
70710 Chuckfellows	1999 UE_{44}	Charles Fellows (born 1962), the Project Manager for the OSIRIS-REx Camera Suite. He was also the Lead and Systems Engineer for the Mars Odyssey Gamma Ray Spectrometer, the Thermal Evolved Gas Analyzer on the Phoenix Mars Lander, and was a team member for the DISR instrument that flew on the Cassini mission.	JPL · 70710
70711 Arlinbartels	1999 UU_{44}	Arlin Bartels (born 1965), the Flight System Manager for the OSIRIS-REx Asteroid Sample Return Mission. Prior to serving in the role, he was the MLA Instrument Manager for MESSENGER, the Lunar Reconnaissance Orbiter Instrument Systems Manager, and the JPSS Deputy Project Manager.	JPL · 70711
70712 Danieljoanna	1999 UW_{45}	Daniel Rose (born 1929) and Joanna Rose (born 1930) had the vision to support "Cosmos: A Spacetime Odyssey, through their philanthropic interest in social justice, education, science literacy, and the health and wealth of the human species," becoming an acclaimed 13-part TV series, airing in 45 languages and 180 countries.	JPL · 70712
70713 Sethmacfarlane	1999 UL_{46}	Seth MacFarlane (born 1973) writer, actor, and producer, is a founding member of the Board of Advisors to the Science and Entertainment Exchange, a Los Angeles branch office of the National Academy of Sciences. He would later serve as an Executive Producer of the 2014, 13-part TV series "Cosmos: A Spacetime Odyssey"	JPL · 70713
70714 Rizk	1999 UX_{47}	Bashar Rizk (born 1959) is the Instrument Scientist for the OSIRIS-REx Camera Suite (OCAMS). He was also a Co-Investigator, Image Team Leader, Senior Data Analyst, and Systems and Calibration Engineer for the Descent Imager Spectral Radiometer (DISR) instrument that took the first images of the surface of Titan.	JPL · 70714
70715 Allancheuvront	1999 UP_{49}	Allan Cheuvront (born 1950) is the Ground System Test Lead for the OSIRIS-REx Asteroid Sample Return Mission. Prior to serving in this role, he was the Mission Operations Manager for OSIRIS-REx, as well as the Stardust comet sample return mission, and a flight team member on the Magellan mission to Venus.	JPL · 70715
70716 Mehall	1999 UF_{50}	Greg Mehall (born 1963), Project Engineer for the Thermal Emission Spectrometer flying on the OSIRIS-REx Asteroid Sample Return Mission. He was also instrument manager, systems engineer, and mission manager for the Mars Global Surveyor TES, Mars Odyssey THEMIS, and Mars Exploration Rovers Mini-TES instruments.	JPL · 70716
70718 HEAF	1999 UY_{51}	The Harlem Educational Activities Fund (HEAF) provides nurturing, educational opportunities for motivated students who are otherwise underserved in their home or community. Founded in 1989 by philanthropist Daniel Rose, HEAF measures its success by the stellar college and graduate school admission rates it fosters.	JPL · 70718
70720 Davidskillman	1999 UB_{53}	David R. Skillman (born 1945) for his decades-long contributions to asteroid searching, stellar binary star systems and as lead systems engineer for the Hubble Space Telescope at Goddard Space Flight Center.	JPL · 70720
70728 Gal-Edd	1999 VA_{4}	Jonathan Gal-Edd (born 1954) is the Ground Systems Manager for the OSIRIS-REx Asteroid Sample Return Mission. He was also the Ground System Chief Engineer for the Landsat Data Continuity Mission, and the Ground Segment Mission Engineering Manager for the James Webb Space Telescope.	JPL · 70728
70737 Stenflo	1999 VA_{11}	Jan Olof Stenflo (born 1942) a Swedish-Swiss astronomer, served as director of the Institute of Astronomy, ETH Zurich, during 1980–2006, after a lectureship at Lund University. His scientific work included contributions to the study of polarized light and solar magnetic fields. He supported the establishment of the Istituto Ricerche Solari Locarno.	JPL · 70737
70744 Maffucci	1999 VW_{20}	Paolo Maffucci (born 1936) is an amateur astronomer at San Marcello Pistoiese who is particularly interested in promoting astronomy.	JPL · 70744
70745 Aleserpieri	1999 VZ_{20}	Alessandro Serpieri (1823–1885) was an Italian astronomer and teacher of mathematics and physics. He determined the Perseid radiant and studied the solar eclipse of 1870 Dec. 22. He also analyzed the Italian earthquakes of 1872 and 1875.	JPL · 70745
70781 Donnelly	1999 VR_{43}	Michael Donnelly (born 1961), the Project Manager for the OSIRIS-REx Asteroid Sample Return Mission. Prior to serving in this role, he was the First Servicing Mission Systems Manager for the Hubble Space Telescope, the AQUA Spacecraft Manager, and the GOES-R Project Manager.	JPL · 70781
70782 Vinceelliott	1999 VS_{43}	Vincent Elliott (born 1970) is the Deputy Project Manager for Resources for the OSIRIS-REx Asteroid Sample Return Mission. Prior to serving in this role, he was the Deputy Project Manager for Resources for the Hubble Space Telescope and the NASA Astrophysics Projects Division Program Business Manager.	JPL · 70782
70783 Kenwilliams	1999 VK_{44}	Kenneth Williams (born 1956) is a member of the navigation team at KinetX, Inc. for the OSIRIS-REx Asteroid Sample Return Mission. He was the Navigation Team Chief for the MESSENGER orbiter and the Stardust Missions, the Lead Maneuver Analyst for the Genesis mission, and a Mission Planner for the Cassini mission.	JPL · 70783

== 70801–70900 ==
back to top

Named minor planet	Provisional	This minor planet was named for...	Ref · Catalog
70850 Schur	1999 VU_{113}	Chris Schur (born 1958) and Dawn Schur (born 1960), American amateur astronomers and amateur paleontologists living in Payson, Arizona. Their astrophotography at their home observatory is of the highest quality and the analysis and cataloging of fossils posted on their extensive website, is quite professional.	JPL · 70850

== 70901–71000 ==
back to top

Named minor planet	Provisional	This minor planet was named for...	Ref · Catalog
70936 Kámen	1999 WK_{1}	The Czech Kámen Castle, is an originally Gothic castle in southern Bohemia near the town of Pacov, first mentioned in the fourteenth century. In the nineteenth century the castle was reconstructed in the English Romantic Gothic style. There is a motorcycle museum there now (Src).	JPL · 70936
70942 Vandanashiva	1999 WV_{8}	Vandana Shiva (born 1952) is an Indian environmental activist. In 1993 she received the Right Livelihood Award "for placing women and ecology at the heart of modern development discourse"	JPL · 70942
70995 Mikemorton	1999 XV_{35}	Michael Morton (1959–1999) was the consummate amateur astronomer, George Observatory volunteer and friend. The continuing success of the Texan observatory is directly related to his knowledge, skills, hard work and dedication. Mike was also a beloved member of the Fort Bend Astronomy Club.	JPL · 70995
71000 Hughdowns	1999 XD_{37}	Hugh Downs (1921-2020), an American television pioneer, program host, journalist and prolific author. He is also a board of governors member of the National Space Society and was a longtime president and chairman of the predecessor National Space Society. The name was suggested by M. Trueblood.	JPL · 71000

back to top

Preceded by 69,001–70,000	Meanings of minor-planet names List of minor planets: 70,001–71,000	Succeeded by 71,001–72,000
