= Alessandro Serpieri =

Italian scientist (1823–1885)

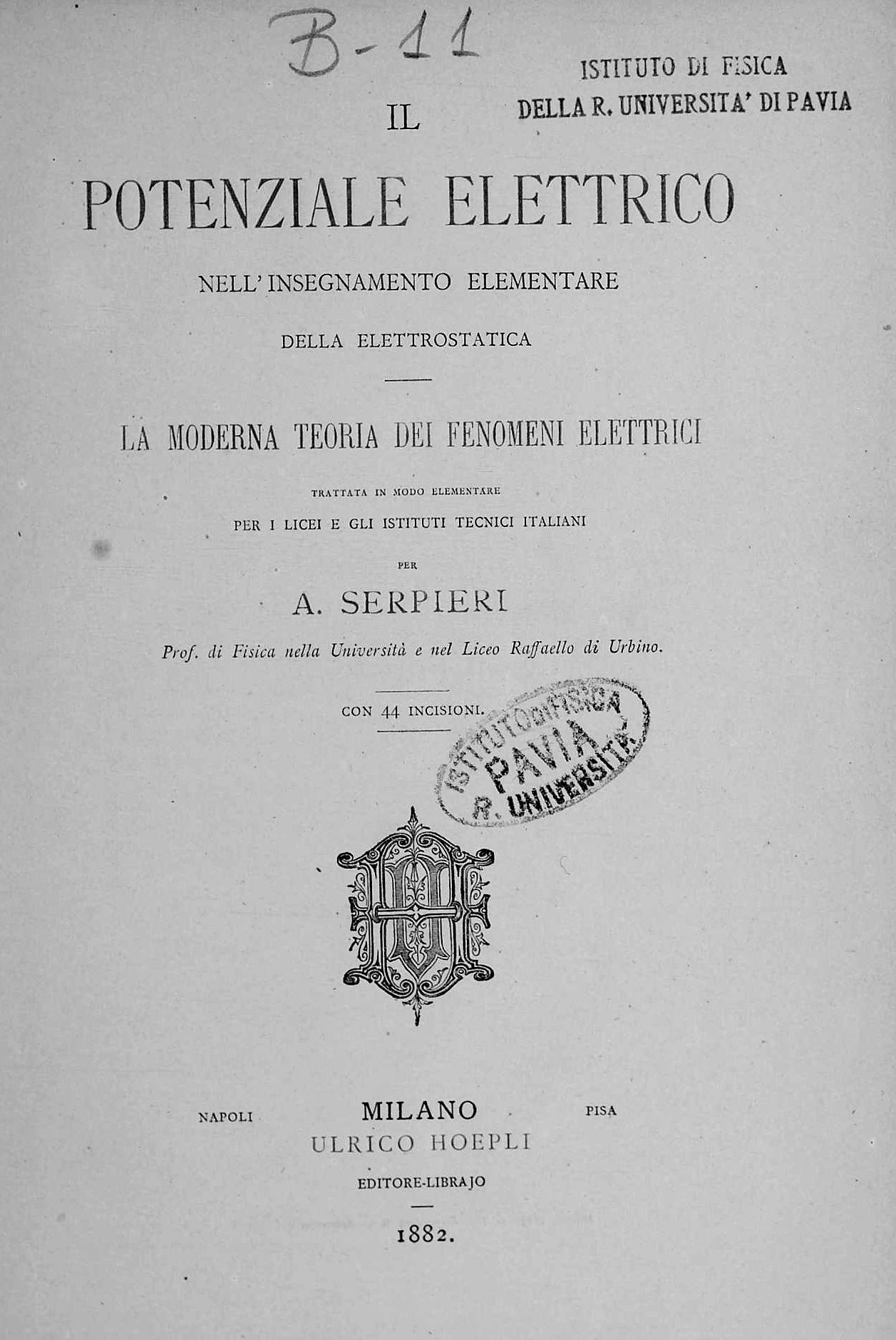
Potenziale elettrico nell'insegnamento elementare della elettrostatica, 1882

Alessandro Serpieri (31 October 1823, San Giovanni in Marignano, near Rimini, – 22 February 1885, Fiesole) was an Italian scientist known for work in astronomy and seismology.

== Early life ==
Serpieri's early education was received in Rimini from the brothers Speranza, who were local priests. He had classical studies at the College of the Scolopians in Urbino, of which the Latin scholar Angelo Bonuccelli was the rector. He entered his novitiate in Florence, on 30 Nov., 1838. From 1840-43, he studied philosophy and the exact sciences at the Ximenian College and Observatory, whose rector, the astronomer and geodete, Giovanni Inghirami, was at the same time professor of higher mathematics. Serpieri was only twenty years old when he was appointed instructor in mathematics and philosophy at the college of Siena.

In November 1846, his superior appointed him professor of philosophy and physics at the college of Urbino, while two months later the Papal Government called him also to the chair of physics in the university of the same city. On 27 August 1848, he was ordained priest, and in November 1857 he became rector of the college. He continued in this position and acted at the same time as professor until 1884, when the municipal authorities notified him of the impending secularization of education, both in the primary schools and in the colleges, inviting him, however, to remain as professor. This caused him and his colleagues to give up their positions at the college. Appointed to the rectorship of the Collegio della Badia Fiesolana, he died in the following year after a short illness.

== Astronomy ==
Serpieri's chief merits as an astronomer rest in the observation of shooting stars. His first treatise on this subject dates from 1847 in the Annali di fisica e chimica of Maiocchi. In August, 1850, he discovered that the August meteors originate in a radiant not far removed from Gamma Persei (hence "Perseids", Ann. di Tortolino, 1850). In the same year, he established an observatory in Urbino, and thereafter published regularly in his monthly bulletin the results of his meteoric observations. These studies helped Giovanni Schiaparelli in the formulation of his theory on shooting stars.

Serpieri himself expressed some views on this subject in his bulletin in 1867. Urged by Angelo Secchi, he went to Reggio Calabria to observe the total eclipse of the sun in 1870, and to ascertain the exact northern limit of the zone of totality. He declared the coronal streamers of the sun observable during the eclipse to be sun auroras caused by the electrical influence of the earth and other planets on the sun (Rendic, Ist. Lomb., 1871). When Schiaparelli called his attention to the work of the American George Jones, comprising 328 drawings of the Zodiacal light as observed at different times and from different places (published at Washington at the expense of the Government), he at once submitted it to analysis. This led him to his theory, in which he explains this phenomenon as light of the earth produced and maintained in the atmosphere by special solar radiations (La luce zodiacale studiata nelle osserv. di. G. Jones, 138 pp. in Mem. Soc. Spettr. Ital., 1876–81). The asteroid 70745 Aleserpieri was named after him.

== Seismology ==
In his study of the earthquake of 12 March 1873, he was the first to introduce the concept of the seismic radiant. He explained the so-called premonition of earthquakes by animals by the hypothesis of a preceding electrical disturbance. His magnum opus is his study on the earthquake of 17 and 18 March 1875, which caused great devastation in his home city and in other places. He also wrote two memoranda on the 1883 earthquake in Casamicciola. His complete seismological studies, for which he received the gold medal at the General Italian Exposition in Turin (1884), were republished in 1889 by P. G. Giovanozzi.

== Published works ==
- a study on the Foucault pendulum (Ann. Tortolini, 1851);
- a treatise on the simultaneous transmission of opposing electric currents in the same wire (Corr. sc. di Roma, 1855)
- a lecture on the unity of natural forces (La forza e le sue trasformazioni, 1868).
- Potenziale elettrico nell'insegnamento elementare della elettrostatica (in Italian). Milano: Hoepli. 1882.
- his last work, on absolute measures ("Le misure assolute", etc., Milan, 1884)

== See also ==
- List of Roman Catholic scientist-clerics
