= List of minor planets: 70001–71000 =

The following is a partial list of minor planets, running from minor-planet number 70001 through 71000, inclusive. The primary data for this and other partial lists is based on JPL's "Small-Body Orbital Elements" and data available from the Minor Planet Center. Critical list information is also provided by the MPC, unless otherwise specified from Lowell Observatory. A detailed description of the table's columns and additional sources are given on the main page including a complete list of every page in this series, and a statistical break-up on the dynamical classification of minor planets.

Also see the summary list of all named bodies in numerical and alphabetical order, and the corresponding naming citations for the number range of this particular list. New namings may only be added to this list after official publication, as the preannouncement of names is condemned by the Working Group for Small Bodies Nomenclature of the International Astronomical Union.

Near-Earth obj.	MBA (inner)	MBA (outer)	Centaur
Mars-crosser	MBA (middle)	Jupiter trojan	Trans-Neptunian obj.
Unclassified

== 70001–70100 ==
Designation			Discovery			Properties		Ref
Permanent	Provisional	Named after	Date	Site	Discoverer(s)	Category	Diam.	Ref
70001	1998 XB_{7}	—	December 8, 1998	Kitt Peak	Spacewatch	·	6.3 km	MPC · JPL
70002	1998 XY_{9}	—	December 7, 1998	Caussols	ODAS	THM	6.2 km	MPC · JPL
70003	1998 XV_{12}	—	December 15, 1998	Višnjan Observatory	K. Korlević	CYB	8.5 km	MPC · JPL
70004 Richardgalli	1998 XF_{26}	Richardgalli	December 15, 1998	Caussols	ODAS	·	7.4 km	MPC · JPL
70005	1998 XN_{28}	—	December 14, 1998	Socorro	LINEAR	·	16 km	MPC · JPL
70006	1998 XZ_{32}	—	December 14, 1998	Socorro	LINEAR	·	4.5 km	MPC · JPL
70007	1998 XX_{40}	—	December 14, 1998	Socorro	LINEAR	·	12 km	MPC · JPL
70008	1998 XA_{53}	—	December 14, 1998	Socorro	LINEAR	·	14 km	MPC · JPL
70009	1998 XM_{53}	—	December 14, 1998	Socorro	LINEAR	·	13 km	MPC · JPL
70010	1998 XO_{64}	—	December 14, 1998	Socorro	LINEAR	LIX	9.4 km	MPC · JPL
70011	1998 XQ_{68}	—	December 14, 1998	Socorro	LINEAR	·	6.2 km	MPC · JPL
70012	1998 XC_{78}	—	December 15, 1998	Socorro	LINEAR	·	8.1 km	MPC · JPL
70013	1998 XZ_{81}	—	December 15, 1998	Socorro	LINEAR	·	6.8 km	MPC · JPL
70014	1998 YL_{3}	—	December 17, 1998	Oizumi	T. Kobayashi	THM	6.7 km	MPC · JPL
70015	1998 YT_{5}	—	December 19, 1998	Prescott	P. G. Comba	·	6.3 km	MPC · JPL
70016	1998 YJ_{6}	—	December 22, 1998	Catalina	CSS	EUP	11 km	MPC · JPL
70017	1998 YL_{9}	—	December 26, 1998	Prescott	P. G. Comba	·	5.9 km	MPC · JPL
70018	1998 YP_{9}	—	December 25, 1998	Višnjan Observatory	K. Korlević, M. Jurić	·	7.6 km	MPC · JPL
70019	1998 YE_{12}	—	December 27, 1998	Oizumi	T. Kobayashi	EOS	7.3 km	MPC · JPL
70020	1998 YR_{29}	—	December 27, 1998	Anderson Mesa	LONEOS	·	10 km	MPC · JPL
70021	1999 AB	—	January 3, 1999	Oizumi	T. Kobayashi	·	11 km	MPC · JPL
70022	1999 AF_{7}	—	January 9, 1999	Višnjan Observatory	K. Korlević	·	12 km	MPC · JPL
70023	1999 AT_{13}	—	January 8, 1999	Kitt Peak	Spacewatch	·	8.9 km	MPC · JPL
70024	1999 AB_{22}	—	January 13, 1999	Socorro	LINEAR	H	1.0 km	MPC · JPL
70025	1999 BH_{2}	—	January 19, 1999	Catalina	CSS	H	1.4 km	MPC · JPL
70026	1999 BO_{3}	—	January 20, 1999	Giesing Obs.	Sala, P.	slow	5.5 km	MPC · JPL
70027	1999 BQ_{15}	—	January 18, 1999	Xinglong	SCAP	·	18 km	MPC · JPL
70028	1999 BM_{17}	—	January 16, 1999	Socorro	LINEAR	·	5.0 km	MPC · JPL
70029	1999 CB	—	February 4, 1999	Oizumi	T. Kobayashi	·	16 km	MPC · JPL
70030 Margaretmiller	1999 CZ_{1}	Margaretmiller	February 7, 1999	Palmer Divide	B. D. Warner	H	1.4 km	MPC · JPL
70031	1999 CF_{6}	—	February 10, 1999	Socorro	LINEAR	H	1.4 km	MPC · JPL
70032	1999 CZ_{13}	—	February 13, 1999	Anderson Mesa	LONEOS	CYB	15 km	MPC · JPL
70033	1999 CO_{20}	—	February 10, 1999	Socorro	LINEAR	fast	7.5 km	MPC · JPL
70034	1999 CY_{35}	—	February 10, 1999	Socorro	LINEAR	·	6.9 km	MPC · JPL
70035	1999 CO_{47}	—	February 10, 1999	Socorro	LINEAR	LIX	9.8 km	MPC · JPL
70036	1999 CZ_{48}	—	February 10, 1999	Socorro	LINEAR	·	6.5 km	MPC · JPL
70037	1999 CX_{64}	—	February 12, 1999	Socorro	LINEAR	·	8.9 km	MPC · JPL
70038	1999 CF_{80}	—	February 12, 1999	Socorro	LINEAR	·	12 km	MPC · JPL
70039	1999 CL_{85}	—	February 10, 1999	Socorro	LINEAR	·	6.8 km	MPC · JPL
70040	1999 CY_{97}	—	February 10, 1999	Socorro	LINEAR	EOS	5.6 km	MPC · JPL
70041	1999 CY_{117}	—	February 12, 1999	Socorro	LINEAR	·	12 km	MPC · JPL
70042	1999 CZ_{122}	—	February 11, 1999	Socorro	LINEAR	·	12 km	MPC · JPL
70043	1999 CJ_{127}	—	February 11, 1999	Socorro	LINEAR	·	4.8 km	MPC · JPL
70044	1999 DD_{2}	—	February 18, 1999	Kitt Peak	Spacewatch	·	1.3 km	MPC · JPL
70045	1999 DA_{5}	—	February 17, 1999	Socorro	LINEAR	·	12 km	MPC · JPL
70046	1999 EN_{3}	—	March 10, 1999	Kitt Peak	Spacewatch	·	1.6 km	MPC · JPL
70047	1999 FL_{10}	—	March 16, 1999	Višnjan Observatory	K. Korlević	·	4.1 km	MPC · JPL
70048	1999 FV_{39}	—	March 20, 1999	Socorro	LINEAR	·	12 km	MPC · JPL
70049	1999 GV_{35}	—	April 7, 1999	Socorro	LINEAR	·	2.9 km	MPC · JPL
70050	1999 GG_{44}	—	April 12, 1999	Socorro	LINEAR	slow	6.6 km	MPC · JPL
70051	1999 GD_{46}	—	April 12, 1999	Socorro	LINEAR	·	1.7 km	MPC · JPL
70052	1999 GS_{60}	—	April 15, 1999	Socorro	LINEAR	·	1.6 km	MPC · JPL
70053	1999 HO_{1}	—	April 17, 1999	Socorro	LINEAR	·	2.0 km	MPC · JPL
70054	1999 HZ_{10}	—	April 17, 1999	Socorro	LINEAR	·	1.6 km	MPC · JPL
70055	1999 JN_{6}	—	May 12, 1999	Socorro	LINEAR	·	2.5 km	MPC · JPL
70056	1999 JJ_{8}	—	May 12, 1999	Socorro	LINEAR	·	2.8 km	MPC · JPL
70057	1999 JJ_{11}	—	May 12, 1999	Woomera	F. B. Zoltowski	·	1.3 km	MPC · JPL
70058	1999 JF_{13}	—	May 15, 1999	Kitt Peak	Spacewatch	·	2.2 km	MPC · JPL
70059	1999 JD_{21}	—	May 10, 1999	Socorro	LINEAR	·	1.6 km	MPC · JPL
70060	1999 JU_{27}	—	May 10, 1999	Socorro	LINEAR	·	2.0 km	MPC · JPL
70061	1999 JO_{29}	—	May 10, 1999	Socorro	LINEAR	·	1.5 km	MPC · JPL
70062	1999 JH_{40}	—	May 10, 1999	Socorro	LINEAR	·	1.9 km	MPC · JPL
70063	1999 JT_{43}	—	May 10, 1999	Socorro	LINEAR	·	2.8 km	MPC · JPL
70064	1999 JA_{44}	—	May 10, 1999	Socorro	LINEAR	·	1.4 km	MPC · JPL
70065	1999 JM_{44}	—	May 10, 1999	Socorro	LINEAR	·	1.5 km	MPC · JPL
70066	1999 JC_{45}	—	May 10, 1999	Socorro	LINEAR	V	1.9 km	MPC · JPL
70067	1999 JE_{46}	—	May 10, 1999	Socorro	LINEAR	·	2.5 km	MPC · JPL
70068	1999 JC_{48}	—	May 10, 1999	Socorro	LINEAR	·	1.4 km	MPC · JPL
70069	1999 JT_{49}	—	May 10, 1999	Socorro	LINEAR	·	2.2 km	MPC · JPL
70070	1999 JX_{50}	—	May 10, 1999	Socorro	LINEAR	·	1.6 km	MPC · JPL
70071	1999 JG_{51}	—	May 10, 1999	Socorro	LINEAR	·	2.2 km	MPC · JPL
70072	1999 JO_{52}	—	May 10, 1999	Socorro	LINEAR	V	1.6 km	MPC · JPL
70073	1999 JN_{54}	—	May 10, 1999	Socorro	LINEAR	·	2.8 km	MPC · JPL
70074	1999 JY_{54}	—	May 10, 1999	Socorro	LINEAR	·	6.1 km	MPC · JPL
70075	1999 JK_{56}	—	May 10, 1999	Socorro	LINEAR	·	1.4 km	MPC · JPL
70076	1999 JD_{57}	—	May 10, 1999	Socorro	LINEAR	·	2.2 km	MPC · JPL
70077	1999 JJ_{59}	—	May 10, 1999	Socorro	LINEAR	·	1.5 km	MPC · JPL
70078	1999 JU_{59}	—	May 10, 1999	Socorro	LINEAR	·	1.9 km	MPC · JPL
70079	1999 JE_{61}	—	May 10, 1999	Socorro	LINEAR	·	2.0 km	MPC · JPL
70080	1999 JN_{61}	—	May 10, 1999	Socorro	LINEAR	·	2.5 km	MPC · JPL
70081	1999 JX_{61}	—	May 10, 1999	Socorro	LINEAR	·	2.6 km	MPC · JPL
70082	1999 JC_{63}	—	May 10, 1999	Socorro	LINEAR	·	1.7 km	MPC · JPL
70083	1999 JA_{64}	—	May 10, 1999	Socorro	LINEAR	·	1.6 km	MPC · JPL
70084	1999 JJ_{65}	—	May 12, 1999	Socorro	LINEAR	PHO	5.0 km	MPC · JPL
70085	1999 JD_{68}	—	May 12, 1999	Socorro	LINEAR	·	1.9 km	MPC · JPL
70086	1999 JV_{69}	—	May 12, 1999	Socorro	LINEAR	·	1.9 km	MPC · JPL
70087	1999 JO_{70}	—	May 12, 1999	Socorro	LINEAR	·	1.9 km	MPC · JPL
70088	1999 JF_{72}	—	May 12, 1999	Socorro	LINEAR	·	1.8 km	MPC · JPL
70089	1999 JV_{75}	—	May 10, 1999	Socorro	LINEAR	·	1.9 km	MPC · JPL
70090	1999 JN_{76}	—	May 10, 1999	Socorro	LINEAR	·	2.7 km	MPC · JPL
70091	1999 JN_{93}	—	May 12, 1999	Socorro	LINEAR	·	2.4 km	MPC · JPL
70092	1999 JH_{105}	—	May 12, 1999	Socorro	LINEAR	·	1.6 km	MPC · JPL
70093	1999 JP_{106}	—	May 13, 1999	Socorro	LINEAR	·	1.3 km	MPC · JPL
70094	1999 JS_{106}	—	May 13, 1999	Socorro	LINEAR	·	1.6 km	MPC · JPL
70095	1999 JH_{118}	—	May 13, 1999	Socorro	LINEAR	·	2.4 km	MPC · JPL
70096	1999 JC_{120}	—	May 13, 1999	Socorro	LINEAR	·	4.2 km	MPC · JPL
70097	1999 JG_{120}	—	May 13, 1999	Socorro	LINEAR	·	2.0 km	MPC · JPL
70098	1999 JR_{120}	—	May 13, 1999	Socorro	LINEAR	·	1.8 km	MPC · JPL
70099	1999 JG_{121}	—	May 13, 1999	Socorro	LINEAR	·	1.7 km	MPC · JPL
70100	1999 JO_{121}	—	May 13, 1999	Socorro	LINEAR	·	2.2 km	MPC · JPL

== 70101–70200 ==
back to top

Designation			Discovery			Properties		Ref
Permanent	Provisional	Named after	Date	Site	Discoverer(s)	Category	Diam.	Ref
70101	1999 JD_{122}	—	May 13, 1999	Socorro	LINEAR	·	2.1 km	MPC · JPL
70102	1999 JE_{123}	—	May 13, 1999	Socorro	LINEAR	·	1.4 km	MPC · JPL
70103	1999 JZ_{131}	—	May 13, 1999	Socorro	LINEAR	·	1.5 km	MPC · JPL
70104	1999 JG_{138}	—	May 8, 1999	Socorro	LINEAR	·	17 km	MPC · JPL
70105	1999 KE_{7}	—	May 17, 1999	Socorro	LINEAR	·	1.4 km	MPC · JPL
70106	1999 KH_{10}	—	May 18, 1999	Socorro	LINEAR	(2076)	2.6 km	MPC · JPL
70107	1999 KS_{11}	—	May 18, 1999	Socorro	LINEAR	·	1.9 km	MPC · JPL
70108	1999 KO_{12}	—	May 18, 1999	Socorro	LINEAR	·	2.0 km	MPC · JPL
70109	1999 KN_{17}	—	May 17, 1999	Anderson Mesa	LONEOS	·	2.1 km	MPC · JPL
70110	1999 LK	—	June 6, 1999	Goodricke-Pigott	R. A. Tucker	·	2.4 km	MPC · JPL
70111	1999 LM_{7}	—	June 9, 1999	Catalina	CSS	·	2.9 km	MPC · JPL
70112	1999 LP_{9}	—	June 8, 1999	Socorro	LINEAR	(2076)	1.7 km	MPC · JPL
70113	1999 LY_{9}	—	June 8, 1999	Socorro	LINEAR	·	1.7 km	MPC · JPL
70114	1999 LA_{13}	—	June 9, 1999	Socorro	LINEAR	·	2.3 km	MPC · JPL
70115	1999 LP_{20}	—	June 9, 1999	Socorro	LINEAR	·	2.7 km	MPC · JPL
70116	1999 LQ_{23}	—	June 9, 1999	Socorro	LINEAR	·	1.8 km	MPC · JPL
70117	1999 LB_{24}	—	June 9, 1999	Socorro	LINEAR	·	2.2 km	MPC · JPL
70118	1999 LM_{25}	—	June 9, 1999	Socorro	LINEAR	·	1.9 km	MPC · JPL
70119	1999 LU_{28}	—	June 7, 1999	Kitt Peak	Spacewatch	·	1.2 km	MPC · JPL
70120	1999 LL_{34}	—	June 11, 1999	Catalina	CSS	·	2.2 km	MPC · JPL
70121	1999 LY_{34}	—	June 13, 1999	Anderson Mesa	LONEOS	·	2.3 km	MPC · JPL
70122	1999 MX	—	June 22, 1999	Woomera	F. B. Zoltowski	·	4.0 km	MPC · JPL
70123	1999 ME_{1}	—	June 24, 1999	Woomera	F. B. Zoltowski	V	1.5 km	MPC · JPL
70124	1999 NY	—	July 10, 1999	Woomera	F. B. Zoltowski	·	2.2 km	MPC · JPL
70125	1999 NZ	—	July 7, 1999	Višnjan Observatory	K. Korlević	·	3.6 km	MPC · JPL
70126	1999 NT_{2}	—	July 13, 1999	Socorro	LINEAR	PHO	3.2 km	MPC · JPL
70127	1999 NC_{4}	—	July 13, 1999	Socorro	LINEAR	·	2.2 km	MPC · JPL
70128	1999 NF_{4}	—	July 13, 1999	Socorro	LINEAR	·	2.3 km	MPC · JPL
70129	1999 ND_{6}	—	July 13, 1999	Socorro	LINEAR	NYS	1.3 km	MPC · JPL
70130	1999 NO_{6}	—	July 13, 1999	Socorro	LINEAR	NYS ·	3.3 km	MPC · JPL
70131	1999 NQ_{6}	—	July 13, 1999	Socorro	LINEAR	·	2.4 km	MPC · JPL
70132	1999 NV_{6}	—	July 13, 1999	Socorro	LINEAR	MAS	1.9 km	MPC · JPL
70133	1999 NC_{7}	—	July 13, 1999	Socorro	LINEAR	PHO	5.0 km	MPC · JPL
70134	1999 NQ_{7}	—	July 13, 1999	Socorro	LINEAR	V	1.8 km	MPC · JPL
70135	1999 NP_{9}	—	July 13, 1999	Socorro	LINEAR	·	1.8 km	MPC · JPL
70136	1999 NY_{9}	—	July 13, 1999	Socorro	LINEAR	·	5.4 km	MPC · JPL
70137	1999 NJ_{10}	—	July 13, 1999	Socorro	LINEAR	V	2.0 km	MPC · JPL
70138	1999 NW_{10}	—	July 13, 1999	Socorro	LINEAR	V	2.3 km	MPC · JPL
70139	1999 NK_{11}	—	July 13, 1999	Socorro	LINEAR	·	4.7 km	MPC · JPL
70140	1999 NX_{15}	—	July 14, 1999	Socorro	LINEAR	·	2.3 km	MPC · JPL
70141	1999 NE_{18}	—	July 14, 1999	Socorro	LINEAR	PHO	4.5 km	MPC · JPL
70142	1999 NP_{18}	—	July 14, 1999	Socorro	LINEAR	NYS	1.4 km	MPC · JPL
70143	1999 NO_{19}	—	July 14, 1999	Socorro	LINEAR	NYS	1.9 km	MPC · JPL
70144	1999 NH_{20}	—	July 14, 1999	Socorro	LINEAR	·	2.2 km	MPC · JPL
70145	1999 NW_{20}	—	July 14, 1999	Socorro	LINEAR	·	2.5 km	MPC · JPL
70146	1999 NX_{23}	—	July 14, 1999	Socorro	LINEAR	·	1.8 km	MPC · JPL
70147	1999 NP_{25}	—	July 14, 1999	Socorro	LINEAR	NYS	3.0 km	MPC · JPL
70148	1999 NT_{26}	—	July 14, 1999	Socorro	LINEAR	NYS	1.5 km	MPC · JPL
70149	1999 NL_{30}	—	July 14, 1999	Socorro	LINEAR	·	6.1 km	MPC · JPL
70150	1999 NS_{31}	—	July 14, 1999	Socorro	LINEAR	·	1.6 km	MPC · JPL
70151	1999 NL_{32}	—	July 14, 1999	Socorro	LINEAR	·	5.2 km	MPC · JPL
70152	1999 NX_{33}	—	July 14, 1999	Socorro	LINEAR	·	2.1 km	MPC · JPL
70153	1999 NO_{34}	—	July 14, 1999	Socorro	LINEAR	·	1.7 km	MPC · JPL
70154	1999 NX_{34}	—	July 14, 1999	Socorro	LINEAR	NYS	2.1 km	MPC · JPL
70155	1999 NF_{35}	—	July 14, 1999	Socorro	LINEAR	PHO	4.9 km	MPC · JPL
70156	1999 NR_{37}	—	July 14, 1999	Socorro	LINEAR	·	2.1 km	MPC · JPL
70157	1999 NV_{37}	—	July 14, 1999	Socorro	LINEAR	V	2.2 km	MPC · JPL
70158	1999 NZ_{37}	—	July 14, 1999	Socorro	LINEAR	·	4.9 km	MPC · JPL
70159	1999 NY_{39}	—	July 14, 1999	Socorro	LINEAR	V	1.7 km	MPC · JPL
70160	1999 NJ_{45}	—	July 13, 1999	Socorro	LINEAR	·	3.0 km	MPC · JPL
70161	1999 NU_{45}	—	July 13, 1999	Socorro	LINEAR	·	1.6 km	MPC · JPL
70162	1999 NV_{46}	—	July 13, 1999	Socorro	LINEAR	·	2.7 km	MPC · JPL
70163	1999 NW_{46}	—	July 13, 1999	Socorro	LINEAR	·	2.1 km	MPC · JPL
70164	1999 NO_{47}	—	July 13, 1999	Socorro	LINEAR	·	1.5 km	MPC · JPL
70165	1999 NT_{49}	—	July 13, 1999	Socorro	LINEAR	·	2.3 km	MPC · JPL
70166	1999 NQ_{50}	—	July 14, 1999	Socorro	LINEAR	·	2.8 km	MPC · JPL
70167	1999 NN_{53}	—	July 12, 1999	Socorro	LINEAR	·	5.2 km	MPC · JPL
70168	1999 NG_{61}	—	July 13, 1999	Socorro	LINEAR	·	2.3 km	MPC · JPL
70169	1999 NX_{64}	—	July 14, 1999	Socorro	LINEAR	·	3.4 km	MPC · JPL
70170	1999 OD_{1}	—	July 18, 1999	Reedy Creek	J. Broughton	NYS	2.5 km	MPC · JPL
70171	1999 OL_{2}	—	July 22, 1999	Socorro	LINEAR	·	4.0 km	MPC · JPL
70172	1999 OQ_{4}	—	July 16, 1999	Socorro	LINEAR	·	2.1 km	MPC · JPL
70173	1999 OB_{5}	—	July 16, 1999	Socorro	LINEAR	NYS	1.6 km	MPC · JPL
70174	1999 PJ_{3}	—	August 11, 1999	Reedy Creek	J. Broughton	·	1.7 km	MPC · JPL
70175	1999 PU_{4}	—	August 15, 1999	Reedy Creek	J. Broughton	·	2.5 km	MPC · JPL
70176	1999 PO_{6}	—	August 7, 1999	Anderson Mesa	LONEOS	NYS	2.2 km	MPC · JPL
70177	1999 PC_{8}	—	August 7, 1999	Anderson Mesa	LONEOS	NYS	1.7 km	MPC · JPL
70178	1999 QC	—	August 17, 1999	Farra d'Isonzo	Farra d'Isonzo	slow	3.8 km	MPC · JPL
70179 Beppechiara	1999 QQ_{1}	Beppechiara	August 21, 1999	Gnosca	S. Sposetti	(5)	2.4 km	MPC · JPL
70180	1999 QM_{2}	—	August 31, 1999	Ondřejov	L. Kotková	·	3.4 km	MPC · JPL
70181	1999 RA_{1}	—	September 4, 1999	Catalina	CSS	V	2.6 km	MPC · JPL
70182	1999 RS_{1}	—	September 5, 1999	Višnjan Observatory	K. Korlević	·	2.5 km	MPC · JPL
70183	1999 RA_{3}	—	September 6, 1999	Višnjan Observatory	K. Korlević	NYS ·	4.9 km	MPC · JPL
70184	1999 RU_{3}	—	September 4, 1999	Catalina	CSS	·	3.2 km	MPC · JPL
70185	1999 RJ_{9}	—	September 4, 1999	Kitt Peak	Spacewatch	·	2.3 km	MPC · JPL
70186	1999 RE_{10}	—	September 7, 1999	Socorro	LINEAR	·	2.8 km	MPC · JPL
70187	1999 RY_{10}	—	September 7, 1999	Socorro	LINEAR	·	4.3 km	MPC · JPL
70188	1999 RE_{11}	—	September 7, 1999	Socorro	LINEAR	MAS	1.8 km	MPC · JPL
70189	1999 RR_{11}	—	September 7, 1999	Socorro	LINEAR	·	4.4 km	MPC · JPL
70190	1999 RW_{11}	—	September 7, 1999	Socorro	LINEAR	·	3.4 km	MPC · JPL
70191	1999 RY_{11}	—	September 7, 1999	Socorro	LINEAR	NYS	2.7 km	MPC · JPL
70192	1999 RE_{12}	—	September 7, 1999	Socorro	LINEAR	NYS	2.5 km	MPC · JPL
70193	1999 RY_{13}	—	September 7, 1999	Socorro	LINEAR	·	2.7 km	MPC · JPL
70194	1999 RW_{14}	—	September 7, 1999	Socorro	LINEAR	NYS	2.6 km	MPC · JPL
70195	1999 RU_{15}	—	September 7, 1999	Socorro	LINEAR	NYS	1.6 km	MPC · JPL
70196	1999 RB_{16}	—	September 7, 1999	Socorro	LINEAR	·	2.1 km	MPC · JPL
70197	1999 RS_{18}	—	September 7, 1999	Socorro	LINEAR	PHO	4.0 km	MPC · JPL
70198	1999 RV_{21}	—	September 7, 1999	Socorro	LINEAR	(5)	2.3 km	MPC · JPL
70199	1999 RL_{22}	—	September 7, 1999	Socorro	LINEAR	·	2.8 km	MPC · JPL
70200	1999 RO_{22}	—	September 7, 1999	Socorro	LINEAR	·	2.6 km	MPC · JPL

== 70201–70300 ==
back to top

Designation			Discovery			Properties		Ref
Permanent	Provisional	Named after	Date	Site	Discoverer(s)	Category	Diam.	Ref
70201	1999 RR_{23}	—	September 7, 1999	Socorro	LINEAR	·	3.7 km	MPC · JPL
70202	1999 RR_{24}	—	September 7, 1999	Socorro	LINEAR	·	5.3 km	MPC · JPL
70203	1999 RE_{25}	—	September 7, 1999	Socorro	LINEAR	NYS ·	6.1 km	MPC · JPL
70204	1999 RD_{26}	—	September 7, 1999	Socorro	LINEAR	NYS	3.5 km	MPC · JPL
70205	1999 RE_{26}	—	September 7, 1999	Socorro	LINEAR	·	4.7 km	MPC · JPL
70206	1999 RT_{31}	—	September 5, 1999	Bergisch Gladbach	W. Bickel	MAS	1.7 km	MPC · JPL
70207 Davidunlap	1999 RP_{33}	Davidunlap	September 4, 1999	OCA-Anza	M. Collins, White, M.	·	2.4 km	MPC · JPL
70208	1999 RX_{33}	—	September 10, 1999	Socorro	LINEAR	PHO	1.7 km	MPC · JPL
70209	1999 RL_{34}	—	September 10, 1999	Višnjan Observatory	K. Korlević	·	8.7 km	MPC · JPL
70210 Cesarelombardi	1999 RA_{37}	Cesarelombardi	September 11, 1999	Bologna	San Vittore	·	2.1 km	MPC · JPL
70211	1999 RZ_{37}	—	September 12, 1999	Višnjan Observatory	K. Korlević	·	2.7 km	MPC · JPL
70212	1999 RA_{38}	—	September 12, 1999	Višnjan Observatory	K. Korlević	NYS ·	5.9 km	MPC · JPL
70213	1999 RB_{40}	—	September 12, 1999	Catalina	CSS	·	2.6 km	MPC · JPL
70214	1999 RU_{40}	—	September 7, 1999	Socorro	LINEAR	·	4.2 km	MPC · JPL
70215	1999 RV_{40}	—	September 7, 1999	Socorro	LINEAR	PHO	3.4 km	MPC · JPL
70216	1999 RH_{42}	—	September 14, 1999	Ondřejov	P. Kušnirák, P. Pravec	·	7.1 km	MPC · JPL
70217	1999 RM_{42}	—	September 14, 1999	Višnjan Observatory	K. Korlević	EUN	3.6 km	MPC · JPL
70218	1999 RY_{42}	—	September 13, 1999	Črni Vrh	Matičič, S.	·	2.8 km	MPC · JPL
70219	1999 RB_{44}	—	September 15, 1999	Višnjan Observatory	K. Korlević	·	4.8 km	MPC · JPL
70220	1999 RF_{44}	—	September 13, 1999	Woomera	F. B. Zoltowski	MAR	2.0 km	MPC · JPL
70221	1999 RZ_{44}	—	September 11, 1999	Saint-Michel-sur-Meurthe	L. Bernasconi	NYS	3.3 km	MPC · JPL
70222	1999 RN_{46}	—	September 7, 1999	Socorro	LINEAR	·	3.0 km	MPC · JPL
70223	1999 RV_{47}	—	September 7, 1999	Socorro	LINEAR	·	1.6 km	MPC · JPL
70224	1999 RZ_{49}	—	September 7, 1999	Socorro	LINEAR	·	2.8 km	MPC · JPL
70225	1999 RG_{50}	—	September 7, 1999	Socorro	LINEAR	·	2.7 km	MPC · JPL
70226	1999 RN_{50}	—	September 7, 1999	Socorro	LINEAR	·	3.0 km	MPC · JPL
70227	1999 RV_{50}	—	September 7, 1999	Socorro	LINEAR	·	4.5 km	MPC · JPL
70228	1999 RY_{51}	—	September 7, 1999	Socorro	LINEAR	MAS	2.0 km	MPC · JPL
70229	1999 RO_{54}	—	September 7, 1999	Socorro	LINEAR	·	2.8 km	MPC · JPL
70230	1999 RH_{56}	—	September 7, 1999	Socorro	LINEAR	NYS	1.7 km	MPC · JPL
70231	1999 RP_{58}	—	September 7, 1999	Socorro	LINEAR	·	1.9 km	MPC · JPL
70232	1999 RA_{60}	—	September 7, 1999	Socorro	LINEAR	·	4.7 km	MPC · JPL
70233	1999 RG_{61}	—	September 7, 1999	Socorro	LINEAR	·	2.3 km	MPC · JPL
70234	1999 RV_{61}	—	September 7, 1999	Socorro	LINEAR	(2076)	1.9 km	MPC · JPL
70235	1999 RL_{62}	—	September 7, 1999	Socorro	LINEAR	·	2.6 km	MPC · JPL
70236	1999 RL_{67}	—	September 7, 1999	Socorro	LINEAR	NYS	3.6 km	MPC · JPL
70237	1999 RO_{68}	—	September 7, 1999	Socorro	LINEAR	NYS	1.9 km	MPC · JPL
70238	1999 RS_{69}	—	September 7, 1999	Socorro	LINEAR	·	2.6 km	MPC · JPL
70239	1999 RA_{71}	—	September 7, 1999	Socorro	LINEAR	·	2.2 km	MPC · JPL
70240	1999 RP_{71}	—	September 7, 1999	Socorro	LINEAR	·	2.4 km	MPC · JPL
70241	1999 RE_{73}	—	September 7, 1999	Socorro	LINEAR	·	2.7 km	MPC · JPL
70242	1999 RN_{74}	—	September 7, 1999	Socorro	LINEAR	·	2.3 km	MPC · JPL
70243	1999 RH_{75}	—	September 7, 1999	Socorro	LINEAR	MAS	1.6 km	MPC · JPL
70244	1999 RL_{75}	—	September 7, 1999	Socorro	LINEAR	·	2.4 km	MPC · JPL
70245	1999 RW_{81}	—	September 7, 1999	Socorro	LINEAR	·	3.5 km	MPC · JPL
70246	1999 RQ_{82}	—	September 7, 1999	Socorro	LINEAR	PHO	3.6 km	MPC · JPL
70247	1999 RR_{82}	—	September 7, 1999	Socorro	LINEAR	·	2.3 km	MPC · JPL
70248	1999 RS_{82}	—	September 7, 1999	Socorro	LINEAR	V	1.5 km	MPC · JPL
70249	1999 RJ_{83}	—	September 7, 1999	Socorro	LINEAR	NYS	1.7 km	MPC · JPL
70250	1999 RF_{84}	—	September 7, 1999	Socorro	LINEAR	·	2.0 km	MPC · JPL
70251	1999 RK_{84}	—	September 7, 1999	Socorro	LINEAR	·	3.4 km	MPC · JPL
70252	1999 RZ_{85}	—	September 7, 1999	Socorro	LINEAR	·	3.8 km	MPC · JPL
70253	1999 RE_{86}	—	September 7, 1999	Socorro	LINEAR	V	2.8 km	MPC · JPL
70254	1999 RC_{88}	—	September 7, 1999	Socorro	LINEAR	·	2.9 km	MPC · JPL
70255	1999 RN_{88}	—	September 7, 1999	Socorro	LINEAR	·	2.5 km	MPC · JPL
70256	1999 RX_{88}	—	September 7, 1999	Socorro	LINEAR	NYS	2.4 km	MPC · JPL
70257	1999 RG_{89}	—	September 7, 1999	Socorro	LINEAR	·	1.6 km	MPC · JPL
70258	1999 RL_{89}	—	September 7, 1999	Socorro	LINEAR	NYS	2.6 km	MPC · JPL
70259	1999 RA_{90}	—	September 7, 1999	Socorro	LINEAR	·	2.3 km	MPC · JPL
70260	1999 RO_{91}	—	September 7, 1999	Socorro	LINEAR	·	3.5 km	MPC · JPL
70261	1999 RU_{91}	—	September 7, 1999	Socorro	LINEAR	·	3.0 km	MPC · JPL
70262	1999 RP_{92}	—	September 7, 1999	Socorro	LINEAR	·	3.5 km	MPC · JPL
70263	1999 RM_{93}	—	September 7, 1999	Socorro	LINEAR	·	2.7 km	MPC · JPL
70264	1999 RP_{93}	—	September 7, 1999	Socorro	LINEAR	·	3.9 km	MPC · JPL
70265	1999 RX_{94}	—	September 7, 1999	Socorro	LINEAR	·	3.0 km	MPC · JPL
70266	1999 RU_{95}	—	September 7, 1999	Socorro	LINEAR	PHO	2.8 km	MPC · JPL
70267	1999 RT_{96}	—	September 7, 1999	Socorro	LINEAR	V	1.8 km	MPC · JPL
70268	1999 RK_{97}	—	September 7, 1999	Socorro	LINEAR	NYS	2.9 km	MPC · JPL
70269	1999 RR_{97}	—	September 7, 1999	Socorro	LINEAR	·	2.0 km	MPC · JPL
70270	1999 RZ_{102}	—	September 8, 1999	Socorro	LINEAR	·	2.5 km	MPC · JPL
70271	1999 RO_{105}	—	September 8, 1999	Socorro	LINEAR	V	2.6 km	MPC · JPL
70272	1999 RG_{107}	—	September 8, 1999	Socorro	LINEAR	NYS	3.1 km	MPC · JPL
70273	1999 RF_{109}	—	September 8, 1999	Socorro	LINEAR	·	3.2 km	MPC · JPL
70274	1999 RG_{109}	—	September 8, 1999	Socorro	LINEAR	·	2.0 km	MPC · JPL
70275	1999 RJ_{109}	—	September 8, 1999	Socorro	LINEAR	·	2.4 km	MPC · JPL
70276	1999 RT_{109}	—	September 8, 1999	Socorro	LINEAR	·	4.1 km	MPC · JPL
70277	1999 RV_{109}	—	September 8, 1999	Socorro	LINEAR	·	2.6 km	MPC · JPL
70278	1999 RK_{110}	—	September 8, 1999	Socorro	LINEAR	·	7.8 km	MPC · JPL
70279	1999 RY_{110}	—	September 8, 1999	Socorro	LINEAR	·	3.5 km	MPC · JPL
70280	1999 RA_{111}	—	September 8, 1999	Socorro	LINEAR	BRU	6.9 km	MPC · JPL
70281	1999 RB_{111}	—	September 8, 1999	Socorro	LINEAR	·	6.2 km	MPC · JPL
70282	1999 RW_{111}	—	September 9, 1999	Socorro	LINEAR	·	6.1 km	MPC · JPL
70283	1999 RK_{113}	—	September 9, 1999	Socorro	LINEAR	PHO	2.2 km	MPC · JPL
70284	1999 RQ_{114}	—	September 9, 1999	Socorro	LINEAR	MAS	2.3 km	MPC · JPL
70285	1999 RZ_{116}	—	September 9, 1999	Socorro	LINEAR	·	1.7 km	MPC · JPL
70286	1999 RA_{118}	—	September 9, 1999	Socorro	LINEAR	V	1.6 km	MPC · JPL
70287	1999 RH_{118}	—	September 9, 1999	Socorro	LINEAR	·	2.4 km	MPC · JPL
70288	1999 RS_{118}	—	September 9, 1999	Socorro	LINEAR	·	1.9 km	MPC · JPL
70289	1999 RW_{118}	—	September 9, 1999	Socorro	LINEAR	·	2.5 km	MPC · JPL
70290	1999 RZ_{118}	—	September 9, 1999	Socorro	LINEAR	PHO	2.9 km	MPC · JPL
70291	1999 RY_{120}	—	September 9, 1999	Socorro	LINEAR	·	2.7 km	MPC · JPL
70292	1999 RC_{123}	—	September 9, 1999	Socorro	LINEAR	V	2.2 km	MPC · JPL
70293	1999 RK_{124}	—	September 9, 1999	Socorro	LINEAR	·	1.9 km	MPC · JPL
70294	1999 RT_{125}	—	September 9, 1999	Socorro	LINEAR	V	2.0 km	MPC · JPL
70295	1999 RM_{127}	—	September 9, 1999	Socorro	LINEAR	·	3.5 km	MPC · JPL
70296	1999 RZ_{127}	—	September 9, 1999	Socorro	LINEAR	·	2.6 km	MPC · JPL
70297	1999 RG_{129}	—	September 9, 1999	Socorro	LINEAR	NYS	2.6 km	MPC · JPL
70298	1999 RJ_{129}	—	September 9, 1999	Socorro	LINEAR	NYS	2.1 km	MPC · JPL
70299	1999 RM_{129}	—	September 9, 1999	Socorro	LINEAR	·	5.0 km	MPC · JPL
70300	1999 RX_{130}	—	September 9, 1999	Socorro	LINEAR	·	2.7 km	MPC · JPL

== 70301–70400 ==
back to top

Designation			Discovery			Properties		Ref
Permanent	Provisional	Named after	Date	Site	Discoverer(s)	Category	Diam.	Ref
70301	1999 RZ_{130}	—	September 9, 1999	Socorro	LINEAR	V	2.2 km	MPC · JPL
70302	1999 RD_{131}	—	September 9, 1999	Socorro	LINEAR	V	1.9 km	MPC · JPL
70303	1999 RX_{131}	—	September 9, 1999	Socorro	LINEAR	·	3.3 km	MPC · JPL
70304	1999 RE_{133}	—	September 9, 1999	Socorro	LINEAR	·	2.1 km	MPC · JPL
70305	1999 RQ_{133}	—	September 9, 1999	Socorro	LINEAR	·	3.0 km	MPC · JPL
70306	1999 RL_{134}	—	September 9, 1999	Socorro	LINEAR	·	2.3 km	MPC · JPL
70307	1999 RV_{134}	—	September 9, 1999	Socorro	LINEAR	NYS	3.1 km	MPC · JPL
70308	1999 RO_{135}	—	September 9, 1999	Socorro	LINEAR	EUN · slow	3.1 km	MPC · JPL
70309	1999 RL_{136}	—	September 9, 1999	Socorro	LINEAR	·	1.8 km	MPC · JPL
70310	1999 RW_{136}	—	September 9, 1999	Socorro	LINEAR	V	1.9 km	MPC · JPL
70311	1999 RG_{137}	—	September 9, 1999	Socorro	LINEAR	·	3.1 km	MPC · JPL
70312	1999 RM_{137}	—	September 9, 1999	Socorro	LINEAR	·	5.0 km	MPC · JPL
70313	1999 RK_{138}	—	September 9, 1999	Socorro	LINEAR	·	4.1 km	MPC · JPL
70314	1999 RN_{138}	—	September 9, 1999	Socorro	LINEAR	PHO	3.0 km	MPC · JPL
70315	1999 RE_{139}	—	September 9, 1999	Socorro	LINEAR	NYS	1.9 km	MPC · JPL
70316	1999 RQ_{139}	—	September 9, 1999	Socorro	LINEAR	·	1.8 km	MPC · JPL
70317	1999 RP_{143}	—	September 9, 1999	Socorro	LINEAR	·	1.8 km	MPC · JPL
70318	1999 RE_{145}	—	September 9, 1999	Socorro	LINEAR	V	1.7 km	MPC · JPL
70319	1999 RP_{146}	—	September 9, 1999	Socorro	LINEAR	·	2.4 km	MPC · JPL
70320	1999 RY_{147}	—	September 9, 1999	Socorro	LINEAR	·	3.3 km	MPC · JPL
70321	1999 RC_{149}	—	September 9, 1999	Socorro	LINEAR	·	1.6 km	MPC · JPL
70322	1999 RU_{150}	—	September 9, 1999	Socorro	LINEAR	MAS	1.5 km	MPC · JPL
70323	1999 RW_{152}	—	September 9, 1999	Socorro	LINEAR	·	2.3 km	MPC · JPL
70324	1999 RK_{153}	—	September 14, 1999	Kitt Peak	Spacewatch	V	1.3 km	MPC · JPL
70325	1999 RT_{156}	—	September 9, 1999	Socorro	LINEAR	NYS	2.1 km	MPC · JPL
70326	1999 RS_{158}	—	September 9, 1999	Socorro	LINEAR	·	2.5 km	MPC · JPL
70327	1999 RQ_{160}	—	September 9, 1999	Socorro	LINEAR	NYS	3.5 km	MPC · JPL
70328	1999 RH_{161}	—	September 9, 1999	Socorro	LINEAR	·	2.5 km	MPC · JPL
70329	1999 RY_{163}	—	September 9, 1999	Socorro	LINEAR	NYS	1.8 km	MPC · JPL
70330	1999 RS_{165}	—	September 9, 1999	Socorro	LINEAR	·	2.1 km	MPC · JPL
70331	1999 RW_{165}	—	September 9, 1999	Socorro	LINEAR	·	1.5 km	MPC · JPL
70332	1999 RF_{166}	—	September 9, 1999	Socorro	LINEAR	·	2.6 km	MPC · JPL
70333	1999 RA_{168}	—	September 9, 1999	Socorro	LINEAR	·	3.2 km	MPC · JPL
70334	1999 RT_{168}	—	September 9, 1999	Socorro	LINEAR	NYS	3.1 km	MPC · JPL
70335	1999 RC_{169}	—	September 9, 1999	Socorro	LINEAR	NYS	3.1 km	MPC · JPL
70336	1999 RO_{169}	—	September 9, 1999	Socorro	LINEAR	·	4.0 km	MPC · JPL
70337	1999 RE_{170}	—	September 9, 1999	Socorro	LINEAR	·	3.3 km	MPC · JPL
70338	1999 RL_{170}	—	September 9, 1999	Socorro	LINEAR	·	2.7 km	MPC · JPL
70339	1999 RQ_{170}	—	September 9, 1999	Socorro	LINEAR	·	6.0 km	MPC · JPL
70340	1999 RF_{173}	—	September 9, 1999	Socorro	LINEAR	·	1.5 km	MPC · JPL
70341	1999 RJ_{174}	—	September 9, 1999	Socorro	LINEAR	·	2.7 km	MPC · JPL
70342	1999 RA_{175}	—	September 9, 1999	Socorro	LINEAR	·	1.4 km	MPC · JPL
70343	1999 RH_{176}	—	September 9, 1999	Socorro	LINEAR	·	2.6 km	MPC · JPL
70344	1999 RR_{176}	—	September 9, 1999	Socorro	LINEAR	(5)	2.2 km	MPC · JPL
70345	1999 RF_{177}	—	September 9, 1999	Socorro	LINEAR	·	2.5 km	MPC · JPL
70346	1999 RO_{177}	—	September 9, 1999	Socorro	LINEAR	·	2.9 km	MPC · JPL
70347	1999 RA_{178}	—	September 9, 1999	Socorro	LINEAR	·	2.6 km	MPC · JPL
70348	1999 RE_{179}	—	September 9, 1999	Socorro	LINEAR	·	3.5 km	MPC · JPL
70349	1999 RV_{180}	—	September 9, 1999	Socorro	LINEAR	·	2.6 km	MPC · JPL
70350	1999 RE_{181}	—	September 9, 1999	Socorro	LINEAR	·	6.9 km	MPC · JPL
70351	1999 RM_{182}	—	September 9, 1999	Socorro	LINEAR	NYS	2.5 km	MPC · JPL
70352	1999 RV_{182}	—	September 9, 1999	Socorro	LINEAR	NYS	3.2 km	MPC · JPL
70353	1999 RB_{183}	—	September 9, 1999	Socorro	LINEAR	·	1.8 km	MPC · JPL
70354	1999 RM_{183}	—	September 9, 1999	Socorro	LINEAR	V	2.4 km	MPC · JPL
70355	1999 RC_{185}	—	September 9, 1999	Socorro	LINEAR	·	2.0 km	MPC · JPL
70356	1999 RP_{185}	—	September 9, 1999	Socorro	LINEAR	NYS	2.3 km	MPC · JPL
70357	1999 RM_{186}	—	September 9, 1999	Socorro	LINEAR	·	2.1 km	MPC · JPL
70358	1999 RN_{186}	—	September 9, 1999	Socorro	LINEAR	·	1.6 km	MPC · JPL
70359	1999 RD_{187}	—	September 9, 1999	Socorro	LINEAR	·	2.0 km	MPC · JPL
70360	1999 RV_{188}	—	September 9, 1999	Socorro	LINEAR	·	2.5 km	MPC · JPL
70361	1999 RK_{189}	—	September 9, 1999	Socorro	LINEAR	slow	5.8 km	MPC · JPL
70362	1999 RF_{191}	—	September 11, 1999	Socorro	LINEAR	·	3.7 km	MPC · JPL
70363	1999 RJ_{193}	—	September 13, 1999	Socorro	LINEAR	·	2.8 km	MPC · JPL
70364	1999 RN_{194}	—	September 7, 1999	Socorro	LINEAR	fast?	2.0 km	MPC · JPL
70365	1999 RF_{198}	—	September 9, 1999	Socorro	LINEAR	·	1.9 km	MPC · JPL
70366	1999 RQ_{198}	—	September 9, 1999	Socorro	LINEAR	·	4.1 km	MPC · JPL
70367	1999 RH_{199}	—	September 8, 1999	Socorro	LINEAR	PHO	3.4 km	MPC · JPL
70368	1999 RN_{202}	—	September 8, 1999	Socorro	LINEAR	·	2.6 km	MPC · JPL
70369	1999 RL_{205}	—	September 8, 1999	Socorro	LINEAR	·	3.8 km	MPC · JPL
70370	1999 RS_{205}	—	September 8, 1999	Socorro	LINEAR	·	3.9 km	MPC · JPL
70371	1999 RB_{206}	—	September 8, 1999	Socorro	LINEAR	V	1.6 km	MPC · JPL
70372	1999 RN_{207}	—	September 8, 1999	Socorro	LINEAR	·	7.4 km	MPC · JPL
70373	1999 RY_{207}	—	September 8, 1999	Socorro	LINEAR	·	2.9 km	MPC · JPL
70374	1999 RD_{210}	—	September 8, 1999	Socorro	LINEAR	·	5.6 km	MPC · JPL
70375	1999 RM_{210}	—	September 8, 1999	Socorro	LINEAR	·	1.7 km	MPC · JPL
70376	1999 RB_{211}	—	September 8, 1999	Socorro	LINEAR	·	4.4 km	MPC · JPL
70377	1999 RE_{211}	—	September 8, 1999	Socorro	LINEAR	·	5.0 km	MPC · JPL
70378	1999 RG_{211}	—	September 8, 1999	Socorro	LINEAR	·	4.5 km	MPC · JPL
70379	1999 RL_{212}	—	September 8, 1999	Socorro	LINEAR	PHO	3.6 km	MPC · JPL
70380	1999 RQ_{212}	—	September 8, 1999	Socorro	LINEAR	EUN	5.3 km	MPC · JPL
70381	1999 RZ_{213}	—	September 13, 1999	Kitt Peak	Spacewatch	·	3.3 km	MPC · JPL
70382	1999 RK_{214}	—	September 5, 1999	Anderson Mesa	LONEOS	·	3.3 km	MPC · JPL
70383	1999 RK_{218}	—	September 4, 1999	Catalina	CSS	·	3.9 km	MPC · JPL
70384	1999 RS_{219}	—	September 4, 1999	Anderson Mesa	LONEOS	·	2.6 km	MPC · JPL
70385	1999 RU_{219}	—	September 4, 1999	Anderson Mesa	LONEOS	·	3.7 km	MPC · JPL
70386	1999 RO_{220}	—	September 5, 1999	Catalina	CSS	V	1.7 km	MPC · JPL
70387	1999 RW_{221}	—	September 6, 1999	Kitt Peak	Spacewatch	NYS	1.7 km	MPC · JPL
70388	1999 RD_{224}	—	September 7, 1999	Anderson Mesa	LONEOS	·	4.0 km	MPC · JPL
70389	1999 RS_{225}	—	September 4, 1999	Catalina	CSS	·	2.4 km	MPC · JPL
70390	1999 RY_{227}	—	September 7, 1999	Kitt Peak	Spacewatch	·	2.3 km	MPC · JPL
70391	1999 RP_{230}	—	September 8, 1999	Catalina	CSS	·	2.3 km	MPC · JPL
70392	1999 RS_{230}	—	September 8, 1999	Catalina	CSS	·	2.2 km	MPC · JPL
70393	1999 RC_{237}	—	September 8, 1999	Catalina	CSS	·	2.9 km	MPC · JPL
70394	1999 RP_{237}	—	September 8, 1999	Catalina	CSS	slow	5.2 km	MPC · JPL
70395	1999 RM_{238}	—	September 8, 1999	Catalina	CSS	·	5.0 km	MPC · JPL
70396	1999 RQ_{238}	—	September 8, 1999	Socorro	LINEAR	MAR	3.5 km	MPC · JPL
70397	1999 RH_{239}	—	September 8, 1999	Catalina	CSS	·	3.2 km	MPC · JPL
70398	1999 RD_{240}	—	September 11, 1999	Anderson Mesa	LONEOS	·	4.9 km	MPC · JPL
70399	1999 RQ_{240}	—	September 11, 1999	Anderson Mesa	LONEOS	·	3.8 km	MPC · JPL
70400	1999 RG_{241}	—	September 13, 1999	Socorro	LINEAR	V	1.5 km	MPC · JPL

== 70401–70500 ==
back to top

Designation			Discovery			Properties		Ref
Permanent	Provisional	Named after	Date	Site	Discoverer(s)	Category	Diam.	Ref
70401 Davidbishop	1999 RH_{241}	Davidbishop	September 13, 1999	Tenagra	Tenagra	·	2.2 km	MPC · JPL
70402	1999 RJ_{242}	—	September 4, 1999	Kitt Peak	Spacewatch	·	2.3 km	MPC · JPL
70403	1999 RK_{244}	—	September 6, 1999	Kitt Peak	Spacewatch	MAS	1.5 km	MPC · JPL
70404	1999 RR_{245}	—	September 7, 1999	Anderson Mesa	LONEOS	·	2.5 km	MPC · JPL
70405	1999 RQ_{248}	—	September 7, 1999	Kitt Peak	Spacewatch	·	1.9 km	MPC · JPL
70406	1999 RT_{252}	—	September 8, 1999	Socorro	LINEAR	V	2.2 km	MPC · JPL
70407	1999 SE_{1}	—	September 18, 1999	Prescott	P. G. Comba	·	2.5 km	MPC · JPL
70408	1999 SH_{1}	—	September 16, 1999	Socorro	LINEAR	·	3.2 km	MPC · JPL
70409 Srnín	1999 SR_{2}	Srnín	September 21, 1999	Kleť	M. Tichý	V	2.0 km	MPC · JPL
70410	1999 SE_{3}	—	September 22, 1999	Socorro	LINEAR	PHO	5.0 km	MPC · JPL
70411	1999 SF_{3}	—	September 22, 1999	Socorro	LINEAR	·	5.4 km	MPC · JPL
70412	1999 SM_{4}	—	September 29, 1999	Višnjan Observatory	K. Korlević	MAR · slow	2.1 km	MPC · JPL
70413	1999 SJ_{5}	—	September 30, 1999	Socorro	LINEAR	·	2.1 km	MPC · JPL
70414	1999 SF_{6}	—	September 30, 1999	Socorro	LINEAR	·	2.1 km	MPC · JPL
70415	1999 SJ_{11}	—	September 30, 1999	Catalina	CSS	·	3.4 km	MPC · JPL
70416	1999 ST_{11}	—	September 30, 1999	Catalina	CSS	V	2.2 km	MPC · JPL
70417	1999 SV_{11}	—	September 30, 1999	Catalina	CSS	·	2.6 km	MPC · JPL
70418 Kholopov	1999 SD_{12}	Kholopov	September 17, 1999	Monte Agliale	Santangelo, M. M. M.	NYS ·	5.2 km	MPC · JPL
70419	1999 SQ_{12}	—	September 30, 1999	Socorro	LINEAR	V	1.6 km	MPC · JPL
70420	1999 SM_{13}	—	September 29, 1999	Catalina	CSS	·	2.4 km	MPC · JPL
70421	1999 SY_{14}	—	September 29, 1999	Catalina	CSS	·	2.3 km	MPC · JPL
70422	1999 SS_{16}	—	September 29, 1999	Catalina	CSS	·	3.8 km	MPC · JPL
70423	1999 SB_{18}	—	September 30, 1999	Socorro	LINEAR	V	2.4 km	MPC · JPL
70424	1999 SA_{20}	—	September 30, 1999	Socorro	LINEAR	·	2.8 km	MPC · JPL
70425	1999 SJ_{26}	—	September 30, 1999	Socorro	LINEAR	fast	3.6 km	MPC · JPL
70426	1999 TN	—	October 1, 1999	Zeno	T. Stafford	·	1.7 km	MPC · JPL
70427	1999 TB_{1}	—	October 1, 1999	Višnjan Observatory	K. Korlević	ERI	5.6 km	MPC · JPL
70428	1999 TP_{1}	—	October 1, 1999	Višnjan Observatory	K. Korlević	NYS	3.1 km	MPC · JPL
70429	1999 TY_{1}	—	October 2, 1999	Višnjan Observatory	K. Korlević	·	4.6 km	MPC · JPL
70430	1999 TM_{2}	—	October 2, 1999	Woomera	F. B. Zoltowski	·	4.7 km	MPC · JPL
70431	1999 TD_{3}	—	October 4, 1999	Prescott	P. G. Comba	·	3.3 km	MPC · JPL
70432	1999 TO_{3}	—	October 3, 1999	Woomera	F. B. Zoltowski	·	1.7 km	MPC · JPL
70433	1999 TS_{3}	—	October 2, 1999	Ondřejov	L. Kotková	·	2.7 km	MPC · JPL
70434	1999 TL_{4}	—	October 3, 1999	Socorro	LINEAR	·	2.3 km	MPC · JPL
70435	1999 TU_{4}	—	October 4, 1999	Socorro	LINEAR	·	4.6 km	MPC · JPL
70436	1999 TT_{5}	—	October 6, 1999	High Point	D. K. Chesney	·	5.3 km	MPC · JPL
70437	1999 TK_{6}	—	October 6, 1999	Višnjan Observatory	K. Korlević, M. Jurić	·	2.2 km	MPC · JPL
70438	1999 TX_{6}	—	October 6, 1999	Višnjan Observatory	K. Korlević, M. Jurić	EUN	3.4 km	MPC · JPL
70439	1999 TE_{7}	—	October 6, 1999	Višnjan Observatory	K. Korlević, M. Jurić	fast	5.5 km	MPC · JPL
70440	1999 TV_{7}	—	October 2, 1999	Socorro	LINEAR	·	3.4 km	MPC · JPL
70441	1999 TH_{8}	—	October 7, 1999	Fountain Hills	C. W. Juels	ERI	3.8 km	MPC · JPL
70442	1999 TR_{9}	—	October 8, 1999	Višnjan Observatory	K. Korlević, M. Jurić	·	2.4 km	MPC · JPL
70443	1999 TV_{9}	—	October 7, 1999	Črni Vrh	H. Mikuž, B. Dintinjana	HNS	2.8 km	MPC · JPL
70444 Genovali	1999 TX_{11}	Genovali	October 9, 1999	San Marcello	L. Tesi, M. Tombelli	ADE	4.9 km	MPC · JPL
70445	1999 TR_{13}	—	October 11, 1999	Črni Vrh	Mikuž, H.	EUN	4.0 km	MPC · JPL
70446 Pugh	1999 TY_{13}	Pugh	October 10, 1999	Gnosca	S. Sposetti	·	3.3 km	MPC · JPL
70447	1999 TG_{14}	—	October 10, 1999	Višnjan Observatory	K. Korlević, M. Jurić	V	2.8 km	MPC · JPL
70448	1999 TS_{15}	—	October 7, 1999	Ondřejov	P. Kušnirák, L. Kotková	·	2.3 km	MPC · JPL
70449 Gruebel	1999 TK_{17}	Gruebel	October 15, 1999	SFA Obs.	Bruton, W. D., Johnson, M. L.	NYS	3.3 km	MPC · JPL
70450	1999 TL_{18}	—	October 13, 1999	Xinglong	SCAP	V	2.2 km	MPC · JPL
70451	1999 TQ_{18}	—	October 14, 1999	Xinglong	SCAP	(5)	2.9 km	MPC · JPL
70452	1999 TH_{19}	—	October 15, 1999	Prescott	P. G. Comba	EUN	2.6 km	MPC · JPL
70453	1999 TS_{19}	—	October 15, 1999	Siding Spring	R. H. McNaught	·	5.4 km	MPC · JPL
70454	1999 TX_{19}	—	October 14, 1999	Xinglong	SCAP	·	2.0 km	MPC · JPL
70455	1999 TM_{20}	—	October 5, 1999	Goodricke-Pigott	R. A. Tucker	·	3.1 km	MPC · JPL
70456	1999 TZ_{20}	—	October 7, 1999	Goodricke-Pigott	R. A. Tucker	·	3.3 km	MPC · JPL
70457	1999 TU_{23}	—	October 4, 1999	Kitt Peak	Spacewatch	·	2.5 km	MPC · JPL
70458	1999 TR_{25}	—	October 3, 1999	Socorro	LINEAR	·	3.5 km	MPC · JPL
70459	1999 TX_{25}	—	October 3, 1999	Socorro	LINEAR	HNS	2.8 km	MPC · JPL
70460	1999 TQ_{26}	—	October 3, 1999	Socorro	LINEAR	·	4.6 km	MPC · JPL
70461	1999 TG_{27}	—	October 3, 1999	Socorro	LINEAR	·	5.3 km	MPC · JPL
70462	1999 TZ_{27}	—	October 3, 1999	Socorro	LINEAR	·	3.6 km	MPC · JPL
70463	1999 TL_{29}	—	October 4, 1999	Socorro	LINEAR	(5)	2.1 km	MPC · JPL
70464	1999 TP_{29}	—	October 4, 1999	Socorro	LINEAR	·	2.5 km	MPC · JPL
70465	1999 TS_{30}	—	October 4, 1999	Socorro	LINEAR	·	3.2 km	MPC · JPL
70466	1999 TU_{30}	—	October 4, 1999	Socorro	LINEAR	·	2.6 km	MPC · JPL
70467	1999 TG_{31}	—	October 4, 1999	Socorro	LINEAR	·	4.3 km	MPC · JPL
70468	1999 TU_{31}	—	October 4, 1999	Socorro	LINEAR	·	3.4 km	MPC · JPL
70469	1999 TN_{32}	—	October 4, 1999	Socorro	LINEAR	·	3.2 km	MPC · JPL
70470	1999 TS_{32}	—	October 4, 1999	Socorro	LINEAR	KON	4.0 km	MPC · JPL
70471	1999 TA_{33}	—	October 4, 1999	Socorro	LINEAR	·	4.3 km	MPC · JPL
70472	1999 TG_{33}	—	October 4, 1999	Socorro	LINEAR	·	4.4 km	MPC · JPL
70473	1999 TQ_{33}	—	October 4, 1999	Socorro	LINEAR	·	3.5 km	MPC · JPL
70474	1999 TH_{35}	—	October 4, 1999	Socorro	LINEAR	·	3.4 km	MPC · JPL
70475	1999 TS_{35}	—	October 4, 1999	Socorro	LINEAR	·	3.1 km	MPC · JPL
70476	1999 TA_{37}	—	October 13, 1999	Anderson Mesa	LONEOS	·	3.3 km	MPC · JPL
70477	1999 TC_{38}	—	October 1, 1999	Catalina	CSS	·	2.5 km	MPC · JPL
70478	1999 TN_{40}	—	October 5, 1999	Catalina	CSS	V	2.2 km	MPC · JPL
70479	1999 TM_{41}	—	October 2, 1999	Kitt Peak	Spacewatch	·	3.3 km	MPC · JPL
70480	1999 TU_{41}	—	October 3, 1999	Kitt Peak	Spacewatch	MAS	1.7 km	MPC · JPL
70481	1999 TX_{43}	—	October 3, 1999	Kitt Peak	Spacewatch	GEF	2.6 km	MPC · JPL
70482	1999 TW_{44}	—	October 3, 1999	Kitt Peak	Spacewatch	·	1.7 km	MPC · JPL
70483	1999 TD_{46}	—	October 4, 1999	Kitt Peak	Spacewatch	NYS	2.7 km	MPC · JPL
70484	1999 TT_{49}	—	October 4, 1999	Kitt Peak	Spacewatch	·	2.6 km	MPC · JPL
70485	1999 TC_{52}	—	October 4, 1999	Kitt Peak	Spacewatch	·	2.4 km	MPC · JPL
70486	1999 TV_{52}	—	October 6, 1999	Kitt Peak	Spacewatch	NYS	3.1 km	MPC · JPL
70487	1999 TZ_{52}	—	October 6, 1999	Kitt Peak	Spacewatch	·	2.0 km	MPC · JPL
70488	1999 TC_{53}	—	October 6, 1999	Kitt Peak	Spacewatch	·	2.8 km	MPC · JPL
70489	1999 TC_{54}	—	October 6, 1999	Kitt Peak	Spacewatch	·	3.1 km	MPC · JPL
70490	1999 TT_{55}	—	October 6, 1999	Kitt Peak	Spacewatch	·	2.6 km	MPC · JPL
70491	1999 TH_{58}	—	October 6, 1999	Kitt Peak	Spacewatch	·	4.2 km	MPC · JPL
70492	1999 TO_{60}	—	October 7, 1999	Kitt Peak	Spacewatch	NYS	2.0 km	MPC · JPL
70493	1999 TC_{65}	—	October 8, 1999	Kitt Peak	Spacewatch	MAS	1.2 km	MPC · JPL
70494	1999 TW_{66}	—	October 8, 1999	Kitt Peak	Spacewatch	·	2.9 km	MPC · JPL
70495	1999 TY_{68}	—	October 9, 1999	Kitt Peak	Spacewatch	·	4.7 km	MPC · JPL
70496	1999 TQ_{72}	—	October 9, 1999	Kitt Peak	Spacewatch	·	4.9 km	MPC · JPL
70497	1999 TZ_{86}	—	October 15, 1999	Kitt Peak	Spacewatch	·	2.0 km	MPC · JPL
70498	1999 TN_{91}	—	October 2, 1999	Socorro	LINEAR	·	2.1 km	MPC · JPL
70499	1999 TN_{93}	—	October 2, 1999	Socorro	LINEAR	NYS	3.7 km	MPC · JPL
70500	1999 TR_{95}	—	October 2, 1999	Socorro	LINEAR	·	2.7 km	MPC · JPL

== 70501–70600 ==
back to top

Designation			Discovery			Properties		Ref
Permanent	Provisional	Named after	Date	Site	Discoverer(s)	Category	Diam.	Ref
70501	1999 TZ_{95}	—	October 2, 1999	Socorro	LINEAR	EUN	3.0 km	MPC · JPL
70502	1999 TB_{97}	—	October 2, 1999	Socorro	LINEAR	·	5.2 km	MPC · JPL
70503	1999 TN_{98}	—	October 2, 1999	Socorro	LINEAR	·	2.8 km	MPC · JPL
70504	1999 TR_{99}	—	October 2, 1999	Socorro	LINEAR	HNS	2.7 km	MPC · JPL
70505	1999 TU_{99}	—	October 2, 1999	Socorro	LINEAR	·	3.4 km	MPC · JPL
70506	1999 TX_{101}	—	October 2, 1999	Socorro	LINEAR	·	5.5 km	MPC · JPL
70507	1999 TP_{102}	—	October 2, 1999	Socorro	LINEAR	·	2.6 km	MPC · JPL
70508	1999 TC_{103}	—	October 2, 1999	Socorro	LINEAR	EUN	2.7 km	MPC · JPL
70509	1999 TD_{103}	—	October 2, 1999	Socorro	LINEAR	·	3.1 km	MPC · JPL
70510	1999 TK_{103}	—	October 3, 1999	Socorro	LINEAR	V	1.6 km	MPC · JPL
70511	1999 TL_{103}	—	October 3, 1999	Socorro	LINEAR	·	3.6 km	MPC · JPL
70512	1999 TM_{103}	—	October 3, 1999	Socorro	LINEAR	V	2.1 km	MPC · JPL
70513	1999 TC_{104}	—	October 3, 1999	Socorro	LINEAR	V	2.1 km	MPC · JPL
70514	1999 TO_{104}	—	October 3, 1999	Socorro	LINEAR	V	2.0 km	MPC · JPL
70515	1999 TO_{105}	—	October 3, 1999	Socorro	LINEAR	·	7.1 km	MPC · JPL
70516	1999 TQ_{105}	—	October 3, 1999	Socorro	LINEAR	·	3.8 km	MPC · JPL
70517	1999 TU_{105}	—	October 3, 1999	Socorro	LINEAR	·	3.0 km	MPC · JPL
70518	1999 TS_{107}	—	October 4, 1999	Socorro	LINEAR	·	1.8 km	MPC · JPL
70519	1999 TD_{108}	—	October 4, 1999	Socorro	LINEAR	·	3.3 km	MPC · JPL
70520	1999 TX_{108}	—	October 4, 1999	Socorro	LINEAR	(5)	3.0 km	MPC · JPL
70521	1999 TF_{109}	—	October 4, 1999	Socorro	LINEAR	·	2.8 km	MPC · JPL
70522	1999 TE_{110}	—	October 4, 1999	Socorro	LINEAR	·	4.4 km	MPC · JPL
70523	1999 TL_{110}	—	October 4, 1999	Socorro	LINEAR	·	1.9 km	MPC · JPL
70524	1999 TH_{112}	—	October 4, 1999	Socorro	LINEAR	·	3.3 km	MPC · JPL
70525	1999 TW_{112}	—	October 4, 1999	Socorro	LINEAR	MAR	1.8 km	MPC · JPL
70526	1999 TG_{113}	—	October 4, 1999	Socorro	LINEAR	·	1.8 km	MPC · JPL
70527	1999 TQ_{115}	—	October 4, 1999	Socorro	LINEAR	·	2.6 km	MPC · JPL
70528	1999 TF_{116}	—	October 4, 1999	Socorro	LINEAR	·	2.4 km	MPC · JPL
70529	1999 TR_{116}	—	October 4, 1999	Socorro	LINEAR	NYS	2.3 km	MPC · JPL
70530	1999 TP_{117}	—	October 4, 1999	Socorro	LINEAR	·	2.5 km	MPC · JPL
70531	1999 TT_{119}	—	October 4, 1999	Socorro	LINEAR	·	3.1 km	MPC · JPL
70532	1999 TX_{120}	—	October 4, 1999	Socorro	LINEAR	·	2.0 km	MPC · JPL
70533	1999 TD_{121}	—	October 4, 1999	Socorro	LINEAR	·	2.8 km	MPC · JPL
70534	1999 TP_{121}	—	October 4, 1999	Socorro	LINEAR	·	2.3 km	MPC · JPL
70535	1999 TU_{121}	—	October 4, 1999	Socorro	LINEAR	·	2.5 km	MPC · JPL
70536	1999 TW_{121}	—	October 4, 1999	Socorro	LINEAR	·	4.1 km	MPC · JPL
70537	1999 TB_{122}	—	October 4, 1999	Socorro	LINEAR	(5)	2.2 km	MPC · JPL
70538	1999 TD_{122}	—	October 4, 1999	Socorro	LINEAR	RAF	3.7 km	MPC · JPL
70539	1999 TR_{122}	—	October 4, 1999	Socorro	LINEAR	(5)	3.3 km	MPC · JPL
70540	1999 TS_{122}	—	October 4, 1999	Socorro	LINEAR	·	4.5 km	MPC · JPL
70541	1999 TW_{122}	—	October 4, 1999	Socorro	LINEAR	·	2.6 km	MPC · JPL
70542	1999 TK_{123}	—	October 4, 1999	Socorro	LINEAR	NYS	3.1 km	MPC · JPL
70543	1999 TQ_{126}	—	October 4, 1999	Socorro	LINEAR	·	2.2 km	MPC · JPL
70544	1999 TW_{126}	—	October 4, 1999	Socorro	LINEAR	·	5.2 km	MPC · JPL
70545	1999 TL_{127}	—	October 4, 1999	Socorro	LINEAR	·	4.1 km	MPC · JPL
70546	1999 TB_{128}	—	October 4, 1999	Socorro	LINEAR	·	3.0 km	MPC · JPL
70547	1999 TR_{131}	—	October 6, 1999	Socorro	LINEAR	NYS	2.6 km	MPC · JPL
70548	1999 TF_{134}	—	October 6, 1999	Socorro	LINEAR	·	5.6 km	MPC · JPL
70549	1999 TM_{135}	—	October 6, 1999	Socorro	LINEAR	·	2.8 km	MPC · JPL
70550	1999 TN_{138}	—	October 6, 1999	Socorro	LINEAR	·	2.7 km	MPC · JPL
70551	1999 TR_{138}	—	October 6, 1999	Socorro	LINEAR	EUN	2.7 km	MPC · JPL
70552	1999 TF_{139}	—	October 6, 1999	Socorro	LINEAR	·	3.4 km	MPC · JPL
70553	1999 TK_{139}	—	October 6, 1999	Socorro	LINEAR	fast	6.0 km	MPC · JPL
70554	1999 TS_{139}	—	October 6, 1999	Socorro	LINEAR	·	2.5 km	MPC · JPL
70555	1999 TW_{139}	—	October 6, 1999	Socorro	LINEAR	EUN	1.9 km	MPC · JPL
70556	1999 TH_{140}	—	October 6, 1999	Socorro	LINEAR	·	3.4 km	MPC · JPL
70557	1999 TF_{141}	—	October 6, 1999	Socorro	LINEAR	·	3.2 km	MPC · JPL
70558	1999 TM_{141}	—	October 6, 1999	Socorro	LINEAR	·	2.0 km	MPC · JPL
70559	1999 TD_{143}	—	October 7, 1999	Socorro	LINEAR	·	3.9 km	MPC · JPL
70560	1999 TP_{143}	—	October 7, 1999	Socorro	LINEAR	·	2.8 km	MPC · JPL
70561	1999 TU_{143}	—	October 7, 1999	Socorro	LINEAR	·	3.5 km	MPC · JPL
70562	1999 TB_{145}	—	October 7, 1999	Socorro	LINEAR	·	3.1 km	MPC · JPL
70563	1999 TH_{147}	—	October 7, 1999	Socorro	LINEAR	·	3.3 km	MPC · JPL
70564	1999 TP_{147}	—	October 7, 1999	Socorro	LINEAR	MAR	2.8 km	MPC · JPL
70565	1999 TC_{150}	—	October 7, 1999	Socorro	LINEAR	(5)	3.0 km	MPC · JPL
70566	1999 TB_{151}	—	October 7, 1999	Socorro	LINEAR	·	3.2 km	MPC · JPL
70567	1999 TK_{151}	—	October 7, 1999	Socorro	LINEAR	·	4.8 km	MPC · JPL
70568	1999 TA_{153}	—	October 7, 1999	Socorro	LINEAR	·	4.2 km	MPC · JPL
70569	1999 TU_{153}	—	October 7, 1999	Socorro	LINEAR	·	2.3 km	MPC · JPL
70570	1999 TW_{154}	—	October 7, 1999	Socorro	LINEAR	·	4.1 km	MPC · JPL
70571	1999 TQ_{156}	—	October 8, 1999	Socorro	LINEAR	·	2.9 km	MPC · JPL
70572	1999 TA_{157}	—	October 9, 1999	Socorro	LINEAR	·	2.9 km	MPC · JPL
70573	1999 TD_{161}	—	October 9, 1999	Socorro	LINEAR	·	2.4 km	MPC · JPL
70574	1999 TR_{161}	—	October 9, 1999	Socorro	LINEAR	·	2.7 km	MPC · JPL
70575	1999 TZ_{161}	—	October 9, 1999	Socorro	LINEAR	·	6.1 km	MPC · JPL
70576	1999 TP_{162}	—	October 9, 1999	Socorro	LINEAR	·	2.4 km	MPC · JPL
70577	1999 TK_{163}	—	October 9, 1999	Socorro	LINEAR	·	3.1 km	MPC · JPL
70578	1999 TF_{164}	—	October 9, 1999	Socorro	LINEAR	·	3.6 km	MPC · JPL
70579	1999 TM_{164}	—	October 10, 1999	Socorro	LINEAR	·	2.2 km	MPC · JPL
70580	1999 TN_{164}	—	October 10, 1999	Socorro	LINEAR	·	3.2 km	MPC · JPL
70581	1999 TJ_{165}	—	October 10, 1999	Socorro	LINEAR	·	2.4 km	MPC · JPL
70582	1999 TR_{165}	—	October 10, 1999	Socorro	LINEAR	·	2.7 km	MPC · JPL
70583	1999 TA_{168}	—	October 10, 1999	Socorro	LINEAR	·	4.3 km	MPC · JPL
70584	1999 TJ_{168}	—	October 10, 1999	Socorro	LINEAR	·	2.4 km	MPC · JPL
70585	1999 TA_{170}	—	October 10, 1999	Socorro	LINEAR	·	3.4 km	MPC · JPL
70586	1999 TE_{170}	—	October 10, 1999	Socorro	LINEAR	·	2.9 km	MPC · JPL
70587	1999 TF_{170}	—	October 10, 1999	Socorro	LINEAR	·	4.4 km	MPC · JPL
70588	1999 TA_{173}	—	October 10, 1999	Socorro	LINEAR	·	3.0 km	MPC · JPL
70589	1999 TO_{173}	—	October 10, 1999	Socorro	LINEAR	(5)	2.4 km	MPC · JPL
70590	1999 TY_{173}	—	October 10, 1999	Socorro	LINEAR	·	2.5 km	MPC · JPL
70591	1999 TU_{175}	—	October 10, 1999	Socorro	LINEAR	·	3.1 km	MPC · JPL
70592	1999 TD_{177}	—	October 10, 1999	Socorro	LINEAR	AGN	3.2 km	MPC · JPL
70593	1999 TD_{178}	—	October 10, 1999	Socorro	LINEAR	·	3.3 km	MPC · JPL
70594	1999 TH_{178}	—	October 10, 1999	Socorro	LINEAR	·	4.5 km	MPC · JPL
70595	1999 TT_{180}	—	October 10, 1999	Socorro	LINEAR	·	4.6 km	MPC · JPL
70596	1999 TV_{180}	—	October 10, 1999	Socorro	LINEAR	(5)	2.2 km	MPC · JPL
70597	1999 TE_{182}	—	October 11, 1999	Socorro	LINEAR	·	4.1 km	MPC · JPL
70598	1999 TP_{185}	—	October 12, 1999	Socorro	LINEAR	·	4.8 km	MPC · JPL
70599	1999 TC_{186}	—	October 12, 1999	Socorro	LINEAR	·	9.6 km	MPC · JPL
70600	1999 TC_{187}	—	October 12, 1999	Socorro	LINEAR	ADE	6.8 km	MPC · JPL

== 70601–70700 ==
back to top

Designation			Discovery			Properties		Ref
Permanent	Provisional	Named after	Date	Site	Discoverer(s)	Category	Diam.	Ref
70601	1999 TM_{187}	—	October 12, 1999	Socorro	LINEAR	·	3.3 km	MPC · JPL
70602	1999 TD_{188}	—	October 12, 1999	Socorro	LINEAR	·	4.0 km	MPC · JPL
70603	1999 TA_{189}	—	October 12, 1999	Socorro	LINEAR	MAR	2.7 km	MPC · JPL
70604	1999 TA_{190}	—	October 12, 1999	Socorro	LINEAR	·	4.5 km	MPC · JPL
70605	1999 TN_{191}	—	October 12, 1999	Socorro	LINEAR	·	2.9 km	MPC · JPL
70606	1999 TC_{195}	—	October 12, 1999	Socorro	LINEAR	PAD	4.5 km	MPC · JPL
70607	1999 TU_{195}	—	October 12, 1999	Socorro	LINEAR	·	3.5 km	MPC · JPL
70608	1999 TC_{197}	—	October 12, 1999	Socorro	LINEAR	·	3.6 km	MPC · JPL
70609	1999 TF_{198}	—	October 12, 1999	Socorro	LINEAR	·	3.0 km	MPC · JPL
70610	1999 TH_{198}	—	October 12, 1999	Socorro	LINEAR	HNS	3.2 km	MPC · JPL
70611	1999 TB_{199}	—	October 12, 1999	Socorro	LINEAR	·	2.6 km	MPC · JPL
70612	1999 TH_{200}	—	October 12, 1999	Socorro	LINEAR	·	2.9 km	MPC · JPL
70613	1999 TG_{201}	—	October 13, 1999	Socorro	LINEAR	·	2.0 km	MPC · JPL
70614	1999 TF_{204}	—	October 13, 1999	Socorro	LINEAR	·	4.3 km	MPC · JPL
70615	1999 TZ_{204}	—	October 13, 1999	Socorro	LINEAR	·	3.0 km	MPC · JPL
70616	1999 TD_{205}	—	October 13, 1999	Socorro	LINEAR	·	1.8 km	MPC · JPL
70617	1999 TN_{209}	—	October 14, 1999	Socorro	LINEAR	·	6.1 km	MPC · JPL
70618	1999 TP_{209}	—	October 14, 1999	Socorro	LINEAR	·	3.6 km	MPC · JPL
70619	1999 TY_{211}	—	October 15, 1999	Socorro	LINEAR	·	3.3 km	MPC · JPL
70620	1999 TF_{213}	—	October 15, 1999	Socorro	LINEAR	V	2.6 km	MPC · JPL
70621	1999 TC_{214}	—	October 15, 1999	Socorro	LINEAR	·	3.6 km	MPC · JPL
70622	1999 TO_{215}	—	October 15, 1999	Socorro	LINEAR	·	3.6 km	MPC · JPL
70623	1999 TP_{215}	—	October 15, 1999	Socorro	LINEAR	·	4.5 km	MPC · JPL
70624	1999 TS_{215}	—	October 15, 1999	Socorro	LINEAR	·	2.2 km	MPC · JPL
70625	1999 TA_{216}	—	October 15, 1999	Socorro	LINEAR	EUN	3.6 km	MPC · JPL
70626	1999 TL_{216}	—	October 15, 1999	Socorro	LINEAR	·	5.2 km	MPC · JPL
70627	1999 TU_{216}	—	October 15, 1999	Socorro	LINEAR	·	2.2 km	MPC · JPL
70628	1999 TE_{217}	—	October 15, 1999	Socorro	LINEAR	·	5.0 km	MPC · JPL
70629	1999 TC_{218}	—	October 15, 1999	Socorro	LINEAR	(5)	1.9 km	MPC · JPL
70630	1999 TJ_{219}	—	October 1, 1999	Catalina	CSS	·	2.3 km	MPC · JPL
70631	1999 TY_{219}	—	October 1, 1999	Catalina	CSS	EUN	3.0 km	MPC · JPL
70632	1999 TN_{220}	—	October 1, 1999	Catalina	CSS	·	3.7 km	MPC · JPL
70633	1999 TG_{223}	—	October 12, 1999	Socorro	LINEAR	·	3.8 km	MPC · JPL
70634	1999 TR_{223}	—	October 2, 1999	Socorro	LINEAR	·	2.2 km	MPC · JPL
70635	1999 TX_{227}	—	October 1, 1999	Kitt Peak	Spacewatch	·	3.0 km	MPC · JPL
70636	1999 TH_{230}	—	October 3, 1999	Catalina	CSS	·	3.0 km	MPC · JPL
70637	1999 TK_{230}	—	October 3, 1999	Socorro	LINEAR	EUN	2.6 km	MPC · JPL
70638	1999 TY_{232}	—	October 7, 1999	Catalina	CSS	·	5.4 km	MPC · JPL
70639	1999 TO_{236}	—	October 3, 1999	Catalina	CSS	·	3.6 km	MPC · JPL
70640	1999 TR_{239}	—	October 4, 1999	Catalina	CSS	(5)	3.1 km	MPC · JPL
70641	1999 TS_{240}	—	October 4, 1999	Catalina	CSS	·	2.8 km	MPC · JPL
70642	1999 TD_{242}	—	October 4, 1999	Catalina	CSS	·	2.6 km	MPC · JPL
70643	1999 TE_{242}	—	October 4, 1999	Catalina	CSS	·	3.8 km	MPC · JPL
70644	1999 TU_{242}	—	October 4, 1999	Catalina	CSS	·	4.6 km	MPC · JPL
70645	1999 TE_{243}	—	October 5, 1999	Anderson Mesa	LONEOS	·	2.5 km	MPC · JPL
70646	1999 TE_{244}	—	October 7, 1999	Catalina	CSS	·	2.6 km	MPC · JPL
70647	1999 TN_{244}	—	October 7, 1999	Catalina	CSS	·	2.3 km	MPC · JPL
70648	1999 TY_{245}	—	October 7, 1999	Catalina	CSS	EUN	2.3 km	MPC · JPL
70649	1999 TB_{246}	—	October 8, 1999	Catalina	CSS	·	5.0 km	MPC · JPL
70650	1999 TM_{247}	—	October 8, 1999	Catalina	CSS	·	3.9 km	MPC · JPL
70651	1999 TV_{248}	—	October 8, 1999	Catalina	CSS	·	5.2 km	MPC · JPL
70652	1999 TB_{249}	—	October 8, 1999	Catalina	CSS	BRA	4.6 km	MPC · JPL
70653	1999 TP_{254}	—	October 8, 1999	Socorro	LINEAR	·	4.1 km	MPC · JPL
70654	1999 TN_{255}	—	October 9, 1999	Kitt Peak	Spacewatch	·	2.3 km	MPC · JPL
70655	1999 TR_{256}	—	October 9, 1999	Socorro	LINEAR	·	3.4 km	MPC · JPL
70656	1999 TF_{257}	—	October 9, 1999	Socorro	LINEAR	·	3.1 km	MPC · JPL
70657	1999 TW_{258}	—	October 9, 1999	Socorro	LINEAR	·	2.2 km	MPC · JPL
70658	1999 TZ_{260}	—	October 13, 1999	Kitt Peak	Spacewatch	NYS	1.5 km	MPC · JPL
70659	1999 TZ_{265}	—	October 3, 1999	Socorro	LINEAR	·	5.7 km	MPC · JPL
70660	1999 TV_{270}	—	October 3, 1999	Socorro	LINEAR	·	3.0 km	MPC · JPL
70661	1999 TS_{274}	—	October 6, 1999	Socorro	LINEAR	NYS	2.3 km	MPC · JPL
70662	1999 TR_{282}	—	October 9, 1999	Socorro	LINEAR	·	3.2 km	MPC · JPL
70663	1999 TG_{284}	—	October 9, 1999	Socorro	LINEAR	·	2.8 km	MPC · JPL
70664	1999 TE_{286}	—	October 10, 1999	Socorro	LINEAR	·	2.3 km	MPC · JPL
70665	1999 TF_{286}	—	October 10, 1999	Socorro	LINEAR	·	2.7 km	MPC · JPL
70666	1999 TW_{286}	—	October 10, 1999	Socorro	LINEAR	HNS	2.9 km	MPC · JPL
70667	1999 TJ_{287}	—	October 10, 1999	Socorro	LINEAR	·	3.4 km	MPC · JPL
70668	1999 TB_{288}	—	October 10, 1999	Socorro	LINEAR	·	2.0 km	MPC · JPL
70669	1999 TT_{290}	—	October 10, 1999	Socorro	LINEAR	·	3.1 km	MPC · JPL
70670	1999 TU_{290}	—	October 10, 1999	Socorro	LINEAR	·	2.6 km	MPC · JPL
70671	1999 TC_{291}	—	October 10, 1999	Socorro	LINEAR	·	2.4 km	MPC · JPL
70672	1999 TM_{293}	—	October 12, 1999	Socorro	LINEAR	·	3.2 km	MPC · JPL
70673	1999 TR_{312}	—	October 5, 1999	Anderson Mesa	LONEOS	MAR	3.1 km	MPC · JPL
70674	1999 TD_{320}	—	October 10, 1999	Socorro	LINEAR	·	3.0 km	MPC · JPL
70675	1999 TY_{321}	—	October 14, 1999	Socorro	LINEAR	MAR	4.3 km	MPC · JPL
70676	1999 UM	—	October 16, 1999	Višnjan Observatory	K. Korlević	NYS	2.5 km	MPC · JPL
70677	1999 UU	—	October 16, 1999	Višnjan Observatory	K. Korlević	·	3.5 km	MPC · JPL
70678	1999 UB_{2}	—	October 18, 1999	Farpoint	Farpoint	PAD	3.3 km	MPC · JPL
70679 Urzidil	1999 UV_{3}	Urzidil	October 30, 1999	Kleť	J. Tichá, M. Tichý	·	2.1 km	MPC · JPL
70680	1999 UN_{4}	—	October 31, 1999	Fountain Hills	C. W. Juels	EUN	5.1 km	MPC · JPL
70681	1999 US_{4}	—	October 31, 1999	Ondřejov	L. Kotková	·	5.1 km	MPC · JPL
70682	1999 UN_{8}	—	October 29, 1999	Catalina	CSS	·	4.3 km	MPC · JPL
70683	1999 UT_{8}	—	October 29, 1999	Catalina	CSS	·	4.5 km	MPC · JPL
70684	1999 UD_{9}	—	October 29, 1999	Catalina	CSS	·	6.1 km	MPC · JPL
70685	1999 UR_{12}	—	October 29, 1999	Catalina	CSS	·	4.7 km	MPC · JPL
70686	1999 UK_{14}	—	October 29, 1999	Catalina	CSS	(5)	2.4 km	MPC · JPL
70687	1999 UE_{15}	—	October 29, 1999	Catalina	CSS	(5)	2.2 km	MPC · JPL
70688	1999 UZ_{15}	—	October 29, 1999	Catalina	CSS	·	5.5 km	MPC · JPL
70689	1999 UU_{16}	—	October 29, 1999	Catalina	CSS	·	5.3 km	MPC · JPL
70690	1999 UF_{17}	—	October 31, 1999	Catalina	CSS	EUN	3.2 km	MPC · JPL
70691	1999 UH_{18}	—	October 30, 1999	Kitt Peak	Spacewatch	V	1.7 km	MPC · JPL
70692	1999 UY_{19}	—	October 31, 1999	Kitt Peak	Spacewatch	·	4.4 km	MPC · JPL
70693	1999 UR_{23}	—	October 28, 1999	Catalina	CSS	V	2.4 km	MPC · JPL
70694	1999 US_{23}	—	October 28, 1999	Catalina	CSS	V	2.6 km	MPC · JPL
70695	1999 UL_{25}	—	October 29, 1999	Catalina	CSS	·	3.8 km	MPC · JPL
70696	1999 UA_{26}	—	October 30, 1999	Catalina	CSS	·	2.7 km	MPC · JPL
70697	1999 UR_{26}	—	October 30, 1999	Catalina	CSS	EUN	3.4 km	MPC · JPL
70698	1999 UW_{26}	—	October 30, 1999	Catalina	CSS	·	3.4 km	MPC · JPL
70699	1999 US_{27}	—	October 30, 1999	Kitt Peak	Spacewatch	NYS ·	4.4 km	MPC · JPL
70700	1999 UQ_{28}	—	October 31, 1999	Kitt Peak	Spacewatch	·	3.6 km	MPC · JPL

== 70701–70800 ==
back to top

Designation			Discovery			Properties		Ref
Permanent	Provisional	Named after	Date	Site	Discoverer(s)	Category	Diam.	Ref
70701	1999 UT_{34}	—	October 31, 1999	Kitt Peak	Spacewatch	·	2.0 km	MPC · JPL
70702	1999 UQ_{36}	—	October 16, 1999	Kitt Peak	Spacewatch	·	2.6 km	MPC · JPL
70703	1999 UO_{38}	—	October 29, 1999	Anderson Mesa	LONEOS	V	3.1 km	MPC · JPL
70704	1999 UG_{39}	—	October 30, 1999	Anderson Mesa	LONEOS	·	3.1 km	MPC · JPL
70705	1999 UK_{40}	—	October 16, 1999	Socorro	LINEAR	MAR	1.8 km	MPC · JPL
70706	1999 UM_{41}	—	October 18, 1999	Kitt Peak	Spacewatch	·	4.1 km	MPC · JPL
70707	1999 UC_{42}	—	October 20, 1999	Socorro	LINEAR	·	5.2 km	MPC · JPL
70708	1999 UR_{43}	—	October 28, 1999	Catalina	CSS	·	7.4 km	MPC · JPL
70709	1999 UB_{44}	—	October 29, 1999	Catalina	CSS	MRX	3.1 km	MPC · JPL
70710 Chuckfellows	1999 UE_{44}	Chuckfellows	October 29, 1999	Catalina	CSS	·	3.2 km	MPC · JPL
70711 Arlinbartels	1999 UU_{44}	Arlinbartels	October 30, 1999	Catalina	CSS	NYS	3.2 km	MPC · JPL
70712 Danieljoanna	1999 UW_{45}	Danieljoanna	October 31, 1999	Catalina	CSS	ADE	2.8 km	MPC · JPL
70713 Sethmacfarlane	1999 UL_{46}	Sethmacfarlane	October 31, 1999	Catalina	CSS	RAF	2.2 km	MPC · JPL
70714 Rizk	1999 UX_{47}	Rizk	October 30, 1999	Catalina	CSS	·	3.6 km	MPC · JPL
70715 Allancheuvront	1999 UP_{49}	Allancheuvront	October 30, 1999	Catalina	CSS	·	2.4 km	MPC · JPL
70716 Mehall	1999 UF_{50}	Mehall	October 30, 1999	Catalina	CSS	(5)	2.1 km	MPC · JPL
70717	1999 UB_{51}	—	October 31, 1999	Anderson Mesa	LONEOS	EUN	2.6 km	MPC · JPL
70718 HEAF	1999 UY_{51}	HEAF	October 31, 1999	Catalina	CSS	·	3.5 km	MPC · JPL
70719	1999 UB_{52}	—	October 31, 1999	Anderson Mesa	LONEOS	·	2.8 km	MPC · JPL
70720 Davidskillman	1999 UB_{53}	Davidskillman	October 31, 1999	Catalina	CSS	HNS	5.1 km	MPC · JPL
70721	1999 VD	—	November 1, 1999	Lime Creek	R. Linderholm	·	2.3 km	MPC · JPL
70722	1999 VY	—	November 1, 1999	Ondřejov	L. Kotková	·	2.3 km	MPC · JPL
70723	1999 VK_{1}	—	November 3, 1999	Baton Rouge	W. R. Cooney Jr., P. M. Motl	·	5.1 km	MPC · JPL
70724	1999 VS_{1}	—	November 4, 1999	Fountain Hills	C. W. Juels	·	4.2 km	MPC · JPL
70725	1999 VH_{2}	—	November 5, 1999	Fountain Hills	C. W. Juels	(5)	4.3 km	MPC · JPL
70726	1999 VS_{2}	—	November 1, 1999	Bergisch Gladbach	W. Bickel	·	2.3 km	MPC · JPL
70727	1999 VX_{3}	—	November 1, 1999	Kitt Peak	Spacewatch	EUN	3.1 km	MPC · JPL
70728 Gal-Edd	1999 VA_{4}	Gal-Edd	November 1, 1999	Catalina	CSS	NYS	2.1 km	MPC · JPL
70729	1999 VU_{4}	—	November 5, 1999	Višnjan Observatory	K. Korlević	PAD	5.4 km	MPC · JPL
70730	1999 VN_{5}	—	November 6, 1999	Fountain Hills	C. W. Juels	·	3.7 km	MPC · JPL
70731	1999 VA_{6}	—	November 5, 1999	Oizumi	T. Kobayashi	·	2.9 km	MPC · JPL
70732	1999 VG_{6}	—	November 5, 1999	Oizumi	T. Kobayashi	·	3.3 km	MPC · JPL
70733	1999 VV_{6}	—	November 8, 1999	Zeno	T. Stafford	NYS	2.7 km	MPC · JPL
70734	1999 VS_{8}	—	November 8, 1999	Fountain Hills	C. W. Juels	·	3.4 km	MPC · JPL
70735	1999 VZ_{8}	—	November 9, 1999	Fountain Hills	C. W. Juels	·	7.2 km	MPC · JPL
70736	1999 VM_{10}	—	November 9, 1999	Oizumi	T. Kobayashi	·	5.0 km	MPC · JPL
70737 Stenflo	1999 VA_{11}	Stenflo	November 8, 1999	Gnosca	S. Sposetti	·	3.4 km	MPC · JPL
70738	1999 VF_{11}	—	November 8, 1999	Višnjan Observatory	K. Korlević	·	3.1 km	MPC · JPL
70739	1999 VN_{17}	—	November 2, 1999	Kitt Peak	Spacewatch	·	4.2 km	MPC · JPL
70740	1999 VG_{18}	—	November 2, 1999	Kitt Peak	Spacewatch	·	4.4 km	MPC · JPL
70741	1999 VO_{18}	—	November 2, 1999	Kitt Peak	Spacewatch	·	3.1 km	MPC · JPL
70742	1999 VF_{19}	—	November 8, 1999	Višnjan Observatory	K. Korlević	fast	3.2 km	MPC · JPL
70743	1999 VG_{19}	—	November 9, 1999	Višnjan Observatory	K. Korlević	·	5.5 km	MPC · JPL
70744 Maffucci	1999 VW_{20}	Maffucci	November 9, 1999	San Marcello	L. Tesi, G. Forti	·	2.6 km	MPC · JPL
70745 Aleserpieri	1999 VZ_{20}	Aleserpieri	November 9, 1999	Pianoro	V. Goretti	·	3.7 km	MPC · JPL
70746	1999 VQ_{22}	—	November 13, 1999	Fountain Hills	C. W. Juels	EUN	4.8 km	MPC · JPL
70747	1999 VT_{22}	—	November 13, 1999	Fountain Hills	C. W. Juels	·	11 km	MPC · JPL
70748	1999 VV_{22}	—	November 13, 1999	Goodricke-Pigott	R. A. Tucker	·	6.8 km	MPC · JPL
70749	1999 VS_{23}	—	November 14, 1999	Fountain Hills	C. W. Juels	·	5.5 km	MPC · JPL
70750	1999 VJ_{24}	—	November 15, 1999	Fountain Hills	C. W. Juels	·	5.2 km	MPC · JPL
70751	1999 VZ_{24}	—	November 13, 1999	Oizumi	T. Kobayashi	GEF	5.2 km	MPC · JPL
70752	1999 VB_{25}	—	November 13, 1999	Oizumi	T. Kobayashi	EUN	3.4 km	MPC · JPL
70753	1999 VL_{26}	—	November 3, 1999	Socorro	LINEAR	·	3.6 km	MPC · JPL
70754	1999 VO_{26}	—	November 3, 1999	Socorro	LINEAR	·	3.6 km	MPC · JPL
70755	1999 VB_{27}	—	November 3, 1999	Socorro	LINEAR	MIS	5.3 km	MPC · JPL
70756	1999 VV_{28}	—	November 3, 1999	Socorro	LINEAR	·	7.2 km	MPC · JPL
70757	1999 VL_{29}	—	November 3, 1999	Socorro	LINEAR	·	4.1 km	MPC · JPL
70758	1999 VB_{30}	—	November 3, 1999	Socorro	LINEAR	·	5.8 km	MPC · JPL
70759	1999 VP_{30}	—	November 3, 1999	Socorro	LINEAR	·	4.2 km	MPC · JPL
70760	1999 VJ_{31}	—	November 3, 1999	Socorro	LINEAR	·	3.9 km	MPC · JPL
70761	1999 VP_{32}	—	November 3, 1999	Socorro	LINEAR	·	2.7 km	MPC · JPL
70762	1999 VZ_{32}	—	November 3, 1999	Socorro	LINEAR	DOR	7.1 km	MPC · JPL
70763	1999 VA_{33}	—	November 3, 1999	Socorro	LINEAR	·	3.9 km	MPC · JPL
70764	1999 VH_{33}	—	November 3, 1999	Socorro	LINEAR	EUN	2.5 km	MPC · JPL
70765	1999 VK_{33}	—	November 3, 1999	Socorro	LINEAR	·	4.6 km	MPC · JPL
70766	1999 VO_{33}	—	November 3, 1999	Socorro	LINEAR	·	4.7 km	MPC · JPL
70767	1999 VP_{33}	—	November 3, 1999	Socorro	LINEAR	·	7.9 km	MPC · JPL
70768	1999 VS_{35}	—	November 3, 1999	Socorro	LINEAR	MAR	4.3 km	MPC · JPL
70769	1999 VL_{36}	—	November 3, 1999	Socorro	LINEAR	·	3.4 km	MPC · JPL
70770	1999 VN_{36}	—	November 3, 1999	Socorro	LINEAR	·	4.2 km	MPC · JPL
70771	1999 VA_{37}	—	November 3, 1999	Socorro	LINEAR	·	5.9 km	MPC · JPL
70772	1999 VD_{37}	—	November 3, 1999	Socorro	LINEAR	·	2.6 km	MPC · JPL
70773	1999 VK_{37}	—	November 3, 1999	Socorro	LINEAR	MRX	2.6 km	MPC · JPL
70774	1999 VS_{37}	—	November 3, 1999	Socorro	LINEAR	·	8.7 km	MPC · JPL
70775	1999 VO_{38}	—	November 10, 1999	Socorro	LINEAR	·	3.0 km	MPC · JPL
70776	1999 VH_{39}	—	November 10, 1999	Socorro	LINEAR	·	5.1 km	MPC · JPL
70777	1999 VG_{40}	—	November 15, 1999	Bergisch Gladbach	W. Bickel	KOR	4.5 km	MPC · JPL
70778	1999 VH_{40}	—	November 5, 1999	Uenohara	N. Kawasato	·	3.0 km	MPC · JPL
70779	1999 VT_{41}	—	November 4, 1999	Kitt Peak	Spacewatch	·	3.8 km	MPC · JPL
70780	1999 VD_{43}	—	November 4, 1999	Kitt Peak	Spacewatch	·	6.2 km	MPC · JPL
70781 Donnelly	1999 VR_{43}	Donnelly	November 1, 1999	Catalina	CSS	·	3.2 km	MPC · JPL
70782 Vinceelliott	1999 VS_{43}	Vinceelliott	November 1, 1999	Catalina	CSS	·	4.9 km	MPC · JPL
70783 Kenwilliams	1999 VK_{44}	Kenwilliams	November 3, 1999	Catalina	CSS	·	6.4 km	MPC · JPL
70784	1999 VO_{45}	—	November 4, 1999	Catalina	CSS	·	2.0 km	MPC · JPL
70785	1999 VW_{46}	—	November 4, 1999	Socorro	LINEAR	PHO	3.0 km	MPC · JPL
70786	1999 VY_{46}	—	November 4, 1999	Socorro	LINEAR	·	8.1 km	MPC · JPL
70787	1999 VE_{47}	—	November 4, 1999	Socorro	LINEAR	·	3.9 km	MPC · JPL
70788	1999 VQ_{47}	—	November 3, 1999	Socorro	LINEAR	·	6.2 km	MPC · JPL
70789	1999 VF_{49}	—	November 3, 1999	Socorro	LINEAR	·	3.7 km	MPC · JPL
70790	1999 VS_{49}	—	November 3, 1999	Socorro	LINEAR	·	3.3 km	MPC · JPL
70791	1999 VX_{49}	—	November 3, 1999	Socorro	LINEAR	(5)	2.4 km	MPC · JPL
70792	1999 VK_{50}	—	November 3, 1999	Socorro	LINEAR	·	3.4 km	MPC · JPL
70793	1999 VW_{50}	—	November 3, 1999	Socorro	LINEAR	·	7.5 km	MPC · JPL
70794	1999 VX_{51}	—	November 3, 1999	Socorro	LINEAR	·	4.1 km	MPC · JPL
70795	1999 VF_{53}	—	November 3, 1999	Socorro	LINEAR	(5)	3.9 km	MPC · JPL
70796	1999 VZ_{53}	—	November 4, 1999	Socorro	LINEAR	·	2.8 km	MPC · JPL
70797	1999 VF_{54}	—	November 4, 1999	Socorro	LINEAR	·	2.3 km	MPC · JPL
70798	1999 VJ_{54}	—	November 4, 1999	Socorro	LINEAR	·	4.7 km	MPC · JPL
70799	1999 VY_{55}	—	November 4, 1999	Socorro	LINEAR	·	2.6 km	MPC · JPL
70800	1999 VE_{56}	—	November 4, 1999	Socorro	LINEAR	·	7.7 km	MPC · JPL

== 70801–70900 ==
back to top

Designation			Discovery			Properties		Ref
Permanent	Provisional	Named after	Date	Site	Discoverer(s)	Category	Diam.	Ref
70801	1999 VF_{61}	—	November 4, 1999	Socorro	LINEAR	·	2.2 km	MPC · JPL
70802	1999 VV_{61}	—	November 4, 1999	Socorro	LINEAR	·	3.8 km	MPC · JPL
70803	1999 VH_{62}	—	November 4, 1999	Socorro	LINEAR	NEM	5.6 km	MPC · JPL
70804	1999 VL_{62}	—	November 4, 1999	Socorro	LINEAR	·	3.8 km	MPC · JPL
70805	1999 VV_{62}	—	November 4, 1999	Socorro	LINEAR	·	3.2 km	MPC · JPL
70806	1999 VD_{64}	—	November 4, 1999	Socorro	LINEAR	·	4.3 km	MPC · JPL
70807	1999 VK_{64}	—	November 4, 1999	Socorro	LINEAR	·	3.0 km	MPC · JPL
70808	1999 VJ_{66}	—	November 4, 1999	Socorro	LINEAR	·	3.2 km	MPC · JPL
70809	1999 VF_{68}	—	November 4, 1999	Socorro	LINEAR	·	2.6 km	MPC · JPL
70810	1999 VM_{68}	—	November 4, 1999	Socorro	LINEAR	·	3.6 km	MPC · JPL
70811	1999 VO_{68}	—	November 4, 1999	Socorro	LINEAR	·	5.2 km	MPC · JPL
70812	1999 VB_{69}	—	November 4, 1999	Socorro	LINEAR	·	3.5 km	MPC · JPL
70813	1999 VR_{69}	—	November 4, 1999	Socorro	LINEAR	·	5.9 km	MPC · JPL
70814	1999 VT_{71}	—	November 4, 1999	Socorro	LINEAR	(5)	2.6 km	MPC · JPL
70815	1999 VR_{72}	—	November 15, 1999	Ondřejov	P. Pravec	·	6.8 km	MPC · JPL
70816	1999 VY_{73}	—	November 1, 1999	Kitt Peak	Spacewatch	·	2.5 km	MPC · JPL
70817	1999 VS_{75}	—	November 5, 1999	Kitt Peak	Spacewatch	AGN	1.9 km	MPC · JPL
70818	1999 VJ_{77}	—	November 3, 1999	Socorro	LINEAR	·	3.3 km	MPC · JPL
70819	1999 VM_{77}	—	November 3, 1999	Socorro	LINEAR	MAR	3.8 km	MPC · JPL
70820	1999 VS_{79}	—	November 4, 1999	Socorro	LINEAR	·	2.5 km	MPC · JPL
70821	1999 VX_{79}	—	November 4, 1999	Socorro	LINEAR	·	3.0 km	MPC · JPL
70822	1999 VZ_{79}	—	November 4, 1999	Socorro	LINEAR	EUN	2.8 km	MPC · JPL
70823	1999 VH_{81}	—	November 4, 1999	Socorro	LINEAR	AGN	3.0 km	MPC · JPL
70824	1999 VL_{81}	—	November 4, 1999	Socorro	LINEAR	·	6.1 km	MPC · JPL
70825	1999 VZ_{81}	—	November 5, 1999	Socorro	LINEAR	·	6.2 km	MPC · JPL
70826	1999 VA_{82}	—	November 5, 1999	Socorro	LINEAR	·	3.0 km	MPC · JPL
70827	1999 VN_{82}	—	November 5, 1999	Socorro	LINEAR	EUN	2.1 km	MPC · JPL
70828	1999 VV_{85}	—	November 4, 1999	Socorro	LINEAR	·	2.0 km	MPC · JPL
70829	1999 VX_{86}	—	November 7, 1999	Socorro	LINEAR	EUN	4.5 km	MPC · JPL
70830	1999 VZ_{86}	—	November 7, 1999	Socorro	LINEAR	MAR	3.5 km	MPC · JPL
70831	1999 VG_{89}	—	November 4, 1999	Socorro	LINEAR	·	3.6 km	MPC · JPL
70832	1999 VM_{90}	—	November 5, 1999	Socorro	LINEAR	MAR	2.0 km	MPC · JPL
70833	1999 VP_{90}	—	November 5, 1999	Socorro	LINEAR	·	3.6 km	MPC · JPL
70834	1999 VU_{90}	—	November 5, 1999	Socorro	LINEAR	(5)	5.2 km	MPC · JPL
70835	1999 VY_{90}	—	November 5, 1999	Socorro	LINEAR	·	4.5 km	MPC · JPL
70836	1999 VW_{91}	—	November 9, 1999	Socorro	LINEAR	·	2.5 km	MPC · JPL
70837	1999 VX_{91}	—	November 9, 1999	Socorro	LINEAR	·	1.9 km	MPC · JPL
70838	1999 VA_{94}	—	November 9, 1999	Socorro	LINEAR	·	2.3 km	MPC · JPL
70839	1999 VR_{95}	—	November 9, 1999	Socorro	LINEAR	·	2.7 km	MPC · JPL
70840	1999 VO_{96}	—	November 9, 1999	Socorro	LINEAR	·	3.0 km	MPC · JPL
70841	1999 VS_{96}	—	November 9, 1999	Socorro	LINEAR	KRM	5.7 km	MPC · JPL
70842	1999 VX_{96}	—	November 9, 1999	Socorro	LINEAR	·	6.4 km	MPC · JPL
70843	1999 VD_{99}	—	November 9, 1999	Socorro	LINEAR	·	2.3 km	MPC · JPL
70844	1999 VN_{105}	—	November 9, 1999	Socorro	LINEAR	·	3.2 km	MPC · JPL
70845	1999 VO_{106}	—	November 9, 1999	Socorro	LINEAR	·	2.7 km	MPC · JPL
70846	1999 VK_{108}	—	November 9, 1999	Socorro	LINEAR	·	2.5 km	MPC · JPL
70847	1999 VM_{112}	—	November 9, 1999	Socorro	LINEAR	·	3.0 km	MPC · JPL
70848	1999 VO_{112}	—	November 9, 1999	Socorro	LINEAR	·	4.9 km	MPC · JPL
70849	1999 VP_{112}	—	November 9, 1999	Socorro	LINEAR	KOR	3.5 km	MPC · JPL
70850 Schur	1999 VU_{113}	Schur	November 4, 1999	Catalina	CSS	PAD	5.9 km	MPC · JPL
70851	1999 VW_{113}	—	November 9, 1999	Catalina	CSS	·	2.5 km	MPC · JPL
70852	1999 VY_{113}	—	November 9, 1999	Catalina	CSS	EUN	2.4 km	MPC · JPL
70853	1999 VN_{114}	—	November 9, 1999	Catalina	CSS	·	3.1 km	MPC · JPL
70854	1999 VP_{115}	—	November 4, 1999	Kitt Peak	Spacewatch	(12739)	3.0 km	MPC · JPL
70855	1999 VS_{117}	—	November 9, 1999	Kitt Peak	Spacewatch	(5)	2.0 km	MPC · JPL
70856	1999 VD_{121}	—	November 4, 1999	Kitt Peak	Spacewatch	526	5.0 km	MPC · JPL
70857	1999 VH_{122}	—	November 4, 1999	Kitt Peak	Spacewatch	·	2.6 km	MPC · JPL
70858	1999 VH_{126}	—	November 9, 1999	Kitt Peak	Spacewatch	fast	2.7 km	MPC · JPL
70859	1999 VN_{130}	—	November 9, 1999	Kitt Peak	Spacewatch	·	4.5 km	MPC · JPL
70860	1999 VW_{133}	—	November 10, 1999	Kitt Peak	Spacewatch	·	4.1 km	MPC · JPL
70861	1999 VN_{134}	—	November 10, 1999	Kitt Peak	Spacewatch	·	2.4 km	MPC · JPL
70862	1999 VJ_{139}	—	November 10, 1999	Kitt Peak	Spacewatch	·	2.7 km	MPC · JPL
70863	1999 VX_{143}	—	November 11, 1999	Catalina	CSS	·	3.8 km	MPC · JPL
70864	1999 VB_{146}	—	November 12, 1999	Socorro	LINEAR	·	2.7 km	MPC · JPL
70865	1999 VP_{147}	—	November 14, 1999	Socorro	LINEAR	·	2.5 km	MPC · JPL
70866	1999 VM_{149}	—	November 14, 1999	Socorro	LINEAR	HOF	5.2 km	MPC · JPL
70867	1999 VA_{150}	—	November 14, 1999	Socorro	LINEAR	·	5.7 km	MPC · JPL
70868	1999 VL_{151}	—	November 14, 1999	Socorro	LINEAR	·	2.3 km	MPC · JPL
70869	1999 VR_{154}	—	November 12, 1999	Kitt Peak	Spacewatch	·	2.8 km	MPC · JPL
70870	1999 VL_{156}	—	November 12, 1999	Socorro	LINEAR	·	4.5 km	MPC · JPL
70871	1999 VS_{156}	—	November 12, 1999	Socorro	LINEAR	·	5.0 km	MPC · JPL
70872	1999 VP_{157}	—	November 14, 1999	Socorro	LINEAR	·	2.4 km	MPC · JPL
70873	1999 VJ_{158}	—	November 14, 1999	Socorro	LINEAR	KOR	2.9 km	MPC · JPL
70874	1999 VR_{159}	—	November 14, 1999	Socorro	LINEAR	·	3.0 km	MPC · JPL
70875	1999 VW_{159}	—	November 14, 1999	Socorro	LINEAR	·	3.3 km	MPC · JPL
70876	1999 VE_{160}	—	November 14, 1999	Socorro	LINEAR	·	4.7 km	MPC · JPL
70877	1999 VL_{160}	—	November 14, 1999	Socorro	LINEAR	BRG	4.2 km	MPC · JPL
70878	1999 VF_{161}	—	November 14, 1999	Socorro	LINEAR	(12739)	3.0 km	MPC · JPL
70879	1999 VF_{162}	—	November 14, 1999	Socorro	LINEAR	·	5.3 km	MPC · JPL
70880	1999 VL_{162}	—	November 14, 1999	Socorro	LINEAR	·	3.2 km	MPC · JPL
70881	1999 VO_{162}	—	November 14, 1999	Socorro	LINEAR	MRX	2.8 km	MPC · JPL
70882	1999 VP_{162}	—	November 14, 1999	Socorro	LINEAR	·	3.7 km	MPC · JPL
70883	1999 VX_{162}	—	November 14, 1999	Socorro	LINEAR	(5)	2.1 km	MPC · JPL
70884	1999 VF_{163}	—	November 14, 1999	Socorro	LINEAR	·	2.6 km	MPC · JPL
70885	1999 VS_{163}	—	November 14, 1999	Socorro	LINEAR	·	2.3 km	MPC · JPL
70886	1999 VY_{163}	—	November 14, 1999	Socorro	LINEAR	(11882)	4.1 km	MPC · JPL
70887	1999 VY_{166}	—	November 14, 1999	Socorro	LINEAR	·	6.0 km	MPC · JPL
70888	1999 VA_{167}	—	November 14, 1999	Socorro	LINEAR	·	3.7 km	MPC · JPL
70889	1999 VX_{167}	—	November 14, 1999	Socorro	LINEAR	·	4.7 km	MPC · JPL
70890	1999 VZ_{167}	—	November 14, 1999	Socorro	LINEAR	NYS	2.5 km	MPC · JPL
70891	1999 VD_{168}	—	November 14, 1999	Socorro	LINEAR	MAR	2.1 km	MPC · JPL
70892	1999 VY_{168}	—	November 14, 1999	Socorro	LINEAR	GEF	2.6 km	MPC · JPL
70893	1999 VT_{169}	—	November 14, 1999	Socorro	LINEAR	·	3.4 km	MPC · JPL
70894	1999 VY_{170}	—	November 14, 1999	Socorro	LINEAR	·	4.9 km	MPC · JPL
70895	1999 VC_{172}	—	November 14, 1999	Socorro	LINEAR	·	3.6 km	MPC · JPL
70896	1999 VH_{172}	—	November 14, 1999	Socorro	LINEAR	·	3.0 km	MPC · JPL
70897	1999 VG_{174}	—	November 5, 1999	Anderson Mesa	LONEOS	·	14 km	MPC · JPL
70898	1999 VR_{176}	—	November 5, 1999	Socorro	LINEAR	·	3.5 km	MPC · JPL
70899	1999 VS_{176}	—	November 5, 1999	Socorro	LINEAR	·	3.2 km	MPC · JPL
70900	1999 VF_{177}	—	November 5, 1999	Socorro	LINEAR	HNS	3.4 km	MPC · JPL

== 70901–71000 ==
back to top

Designation			Discovery			Properties		Ref
Permanent	Provisional	Named after	Date	Site	Discoverer(s)	Category	Diam.	Ref
70901	1999 VD_{178}	—	November 6, 1999	Socorro	LINEAR	·	3.2 km	MPC · JPL
70902	1999 VH_{178}	—	November 6, 1999	Socorro	LINEAR	·	2.6 km	MPC · JPL
70903	1999 VD_{179}	—	November 6, 1999	Socorro	LINEAR	EUN	3.3 km	MPC · JPL
70904	1999 VB_{184}	—	November 15, 1999	Socorro	LINEAR	·	2.8 km	MPC · JPL
70905	1999 VF_{185}	—	November 15, 1999	Socorro	LINEAR	·	7.8 km	MPC · JPL
70906	1999 VL_{185}	—	November 15, 1999	Socorro	LINEAR	·	2.3 km	MPC · JPL
70907	1999 VB_{186}	—	November 15, 1999	Socorro	LINEAR	HOF	5.1 km	MPC · JPL
70908	1999 VD_{186}	—	November 15, 1999	Socorro	LINEAR	·	2.9 km	MPC · JPL
70909	1999 VG_{186}	—	November 15, 1999	Socorro	LINEAR	·	6.2 km	MPC · JPL
70910	1999 VJ_{186}	—	November 15, 1999	Socorro	LINEAR	(5)	3.8 km	MPC · JPL
70911	1999 VT_{186}	—	November 15, 1999	Socorro	LINEAR	·	3.3 km	MPC · JPL
70912	1999 VC_{187}	—	November 15, 1999	Socorro	LINEAR	·	2.4 km	MPC · JPL
70913	1999 VP_{187}	—	November 15, 1999	Socorro	LINEAR	(12739)	3.4 km	MPC · JPL
70914	1999 VA_{194}	—	November 3, 1999	Socorro	LINEAR	·	2.7 km	MPC · JPL
70915	1999 VN_{194}	—	November 1, 1999	Catalina	CSS	·	2.8 km	MPC · JPL
70916	1999 VH_{195}	—	November 3, 1999	Catalina	CSS	·	3.2 km	MPC · JPL
70917	1999 VN_{195}	—	November 3, 1999	Catalina	CSS	PAD	5.3 km	MPC · JPL
70918	1999 VY_{195}	—	November 4, 1999	Catalina	CSS	V	1.9 km	MPC · JPL
70919	1999 VA_{196}	—	November 4, 1999	Catalina	CSS	·	1.7 km	MPC · JPL
70920	1999 VG_{196}	—	November 4, 1999	Anderson Mesa	LONEOS	·	3.2 km	MPC · JPL
70921	1999 VY_{196}	—	November 1, 1999	Catalina	CSS	·	4.5 km	MPC · JPL
70922	1999 VZ_{196}	—	November 1, 1999	Catalina	CSS	·	2.8 km	MPC · JPL
70923	1999 VY_{197}	—	November 3, 1999	Catalina	CSS	·	4.1 km	MPC · JPL
70924	1999 VC_{205}	—	November 10, 1999	Kitt Peak	Spacewatch	·	2.8 km	MPC · JPL
70925	1999 VK_{205}	—	November 7, 1999	Socorro	LINEAR	·	3.6 km	MPC · JPL
70926	1999 VJ_{208}	—	November 9, 1999	Kitt Peak	Spacewatch	·	3.0 km	MPC · JPL
70927	1999 VX_{210}	—	November 13, 1999	Catalina	CSS	·	3.5 km	MPC · JPL
70928	1999 VS_{211}	—	November 12, 1999	Socorro	LINEAR	HOF	5.3 km	MPC · JPL
70929	1999 VN_{216}	—	November 3, 1999	Socorro	LINEAR	(5)	2.1 km	MPC · JPL
70930	1999 VN_{218}	—	November 1, 1999	Kitt Peak	Spacewatch	·	1.9 km	MPC · JPL
70931	1999 VW_{219}	—	November 5, 1999	Socorro	LINEAR	EUN	2.4 km	MPC · JPL
70932	1999 VX_{223}	—	November 5, 1999	Socorro	LINEAR	GEF	3.5 km	MPC · JPL
70933	1999 VY_{223}	—	November 5, 1999	Socorro	LINEAR	·	2.2 km	MPC · JPL
70934	1999 VN_{225}	—	November 5, 1999	Socorro	LINEAR	·	2.2 km	MPC · JPL
70935	1999 WG	—	November 16, 1999	Oizumi	T. Kobayashi	·	3.9 km	MPC · JPL
70936 Kámen	1999 WK_{1}	Kámen	November 28, 1999	Kleť	J. Tichá, M. Tichý	PAD	6.9 km	MPC · JPL
70937	1999 WT_{2}	—	November 29, 1999	Kleť	Kleť	·	2.7 km	MPC · JPL
70938	1999 WZ_{3}	—	November 28, 1999	Oizumi	T. Kobayashi	KOR	4.9 km	MPC · JPL
70939	1999 WS_{5}	—	November 29, 1999	Kitt Peak	Spacewatch	·	2.2 km	MPC · JPL
70940	1999 WT_{5}	—	November 29, 1999	Kitt Peak	Spacewatch	V	2.0 km	MPC · JPL
70941	1999 WJ_{6}	—	November 28, 1999	Višnjan Observatory	K. Korlević	·	2.9 km	MPC · JPL
70942 Vandanashiva	1999 WV_{8}	Vandanashiva	November 28, 1999	Gnosca	S. Sposetti	(5)	3.0 km	MPC · JPL
70943	1999 WM_{9}	—	November 29, 1999	Farra d'Isonzo	Farra d'Isonzo	·	3.5 km	MPC · JPL
70944	1999 WX_{9}	—	November 30, 1999	Oizumi	T. Kobayashi	EUN	3.4 km	MPC · JPL
70945	1999 WB_{10}	—	November 30, 1999	Oizumi	T. Kobayashi	·	3.5 km	MPC · JPL
70946	1999 WD_{10}	—	November 30, 1999	Oizumi	T. Kobayashi	·	4.4 km	MPC · JPL
70947	1999 WT_{11}	—	November 28, 1999	Kitt Peak	Spacewatch	·	2.5 km	MPC · JPL
70948	1999 WW_{16}	—	November 30, 1999	Kitt Peak	Spacewatch	·	2.5 km	MPC · JPL
70949	1999 WX_{17}	—	November 30, 1999	Kitt Peak	Spacewatch	·	4.1 km	MPC · JPL
70950	1999 WU_{18}	—	November 30, 1999	Kitt Peak	Spacewatch	·	2.4 km	MPC · JPL
70951	1999 WV_{22}	—	November 17, 1999	Kitt Peak	Spacewatch	·	5.4 km	MPC · JPL
70952	1999 XE	—	December 2, 1999	Kitt Peak	Spacewatch	·	2.8 km	MPC · JPL
70953	1999 XY_{1}	—	December 3, 1999	Fountain Hills	C. W. Juels	(194)	3.3 km	MPC · JPL
70954	1999 XK_{2}	—	December 2, 1999	Kitt Peak	Spacewatch	THM	6.5 km	MPC · JPL
70955	1999 XX_{2}	—	December 4, 1999	Catalina	CSS	EUN	2.4 km	MPC · JPL
70956	1999 XW_{4}	—	December 4, 1999	Catalina	CSS	·	2.7 km	MPC · JPL
70957	1999 XQ_{5}	—	December 7, 1999	Oaxaca	Roe, J. M.	·	7.6 km	MPC · JPL
70958	1999 XC_{6}	—	December 4, 1999	Catalina	CSS	·	4.7 km	MPC · JPL
70959	1999 XC_{7}	—	December 4, 1999	Catalina	CSS	MIS	4.6 km	MPC · JPL
70960	1999 XH_{7}	—	December 4, 1999	Catalina	CSS	EUN	3.7 km	MPC · JPL
70961	1999 XY_{7}	—	December 3, 1999	Socorro	LINEAR	PHO	5.1 km	MPC · JPL
70962	1999 XL_{9}	—	December 2, 1999	Kitt Peak	Spacewatch	·	4.8 km	MPC · JPL
70963	1999 XT_{10}	—	December 5, 1999	Catalina	CSS	·	3.4 km	MPC · JPL
70964	1999 XK_{12}	—	December 5, 1999	Socorro	LINEAR	EUN	3.4 km	MPC · JPL
70965	1999 XC_{13}	—	December 5, 1999	Socorro	LINEAR	·	2.9 km	MPC · JPL
70966	1999 XD_{18}	—	December 3, 1999	Socorro	LINEAR	MAR	3.1 km	MPC · JPL
70967	1999 XG_{18}	—	December 3, 1999	Socorro	LINEAR	·	3.3 km	MPC · JPL
70968	1999 XA_{20}	—	December 5, 1999	Socorro	LINEAR	·	4.0 km	MPC · JPL
70969	1999 XG_{20}	—	December 5, 1999	Socorro	LINEAR	EUN	3.1 km	MPC · JPL
70970	1999 XH_{20}	—	December 5, 1999	Socorro	LINEAR	·	4.5 km	MPC · JPL
70971	1999 XL_{20}	—	December 5, 1999	Socorro	LINEAR	NYS	4.1 km	MPC · JPL
70972	1999 XM_{20}	—	December 5, 1999	Socorro	LINEAR	V	2.5 km	MPC · JPL
70973	1999 XY_{20}	—	December 5, 1999	Socorro	LINEAR	·	3.3 km	MPC · JPL
70974	1999 XE_{23}	—	December 6, 1999	Socorro	LINEAR	·	3.0 km	MPC · JPL
70975	1999 XJ_{23}	—	December 6, 1999	Socorro	LINEAR	·	2.9 km	MPC · JPL
70976	1999 XS_{23}	—	December 6, 1999	Socorro	LINEAR	·	2.8 km	MPC · JPL
70977	1999 XU_{23}	—	December 6, 1999	Socorro	LINEAR	·	3.7 km	MPC · JPL
70978	1999 XP_{24}	—	December 6, 1999	Socorro	LINEAR	·	3.3 km	MPC · JPL
70979	1999 XU_{24}	—	December 6, 1999	Socorro	LINEAR	·	6.2 km	MPC · JPL
70980	1999 XA_{25}	—	December 6, 1999	Socorro	LINEAR	·	7.8 km	MPC · JPL
70981	1999 XE_{25}	—	December 6, 1999	Socorro	LINEAR	·	3.3 km	MPC · JPL
70982	1999 XJ_{25}	—	December 6, 1999	Socorro	LINEAR	·	3.6 km	MPC · JPL
70983	1999 XB_{27}	—	December 6, 1999	Socorro	LINEAR	·	4.4 km	MPC · JPL
70984	1999 XW_{27}	—	December 6, 1999	Socorro	LINEAR	(5)	2.4 km	MPC · JPL
70985	1999 XA_{28}	—	December 6, 1999	Socorro	LINEAR	·	3.1 km	MPC · JPL
70986	1999 XR_{28}	—	December 6, 1999	Socorro	LINEAR	·	2.8 km	MPC · JPL
70987	1999 XA_{29}	—	December 6, 1999	Socorro	LINEAR	·	4.0 km	MPC · JPL
70988	1999 XU_{29}	—	December 6, 1999	Socorro	LINEAR	·	3.1 km	MPC · JPL
70989	1999 XT_{32}	—	December 6, 1999	Socorro	LINEAR	·	6.6 km	MPC · JPL
70990	1999 XA_{33}	—	December 6, 1999	Socorro	LINEAR	·	4.9 km	MPC · JPL
70991	1999 XG_{33}	—	December 6, 1999	Socorro	LINEAR	·	4.3 km	MPC · JPL
70992	1999 XU_{34}	—	December 6, 1999	Socorro	LINEAR	HNS	4.4 km	MPC · JPL
70993	1999 XX_{34}	—	December 6, 1999	Socorro	LINEAR	(5)	3.9 km	MPC · JPL
70994	1999 XL_{35}	—	December 7, 1999	Socorro	LINEAR	·	3.9 km	MPC · JPL
70995 Mikemorton	1999 XV_{35}	Mikemorton	December 6, 1999	Needville	Needville	·	4.6 km	MPC · JPL
70996	1999 XY_{35}	—	December 6, 1999	Oizumi	T. Kobayashi	·	5.6 km	MPC · JPL
70997	1999 XE_{36}	—	December 6, 1999	Oizumi	T. Kobayashi	·	6.2 km	MPC · JPL
70998	1999 XH_{36}	—	December 6, 1999	Oizumi	T. Kobayashi	EOS	6.3 km	MPC · JPL
70999	1999 XW_{36}	—	December 7, 1999	Fountain Hills	C. W. Juels	·	3.6 km	MPC · JPL
71000 Hughdowns	1999 XD_{37}	Hughdowns	December 7, 1999	Fountain Hills	C. W. Juels	ADE	7.9 km	MPC · JPL

back to top

== See also ==
- Meanings of minor-planet names: 70001–71000
