= Meanings of minor-planet names: 72001–73000 =

As minor planet discoveries are confirmed, they are given a permanent number by the IAU's Minor Planet Center (MPC), and the discoverers can then submit names for them, following the IAU's naming conventions. The list below concerns those minor planets in the specified number-range that have received names, and explains the meanings of those names.

Official naming citations of newly named small Solar System bodies are approved and published in a bulletin by IAU's Working Group for Small Bodies Nomenclature (WGSBN). Before May 2021, citations were published in MPC's Minor Planet Circulars for many decades. Recent citations can also be found on the JPL Small-Body Database (SBDB). Until his death in 2016, German astronomer Lutz D. Schmadel compiled these citations into the Dictionary of Minor Planet Names (DMP) and regularly updated the collection.

Based on Paul Herget's The Names of the Minor Planets, Schmadel also researched the unclear origin of numerous asteroids, most of which had been named prior to World War II. This article incorporates text from this source, which is in the public domain: SBDB New namings may only be added to this list below after official publication as the preannouncement of names is condemned. The WGSBN publishes a comprehensive guideline for the naming rules of non-cometary small Solar System bodies.

== 72001–72100 ==
Named minor planet	Provisional	This minor planet was named for...	Ref · Catalog
72012 Terute	2000 XT_{10}	"Terute" refers to an ancient legend from the Japanese city of Sagamihara in Kanagawa Prefecture, and involves a tragic love story. Remains dating back to the Paleolithic era have been found around the city. At the 2012 universe-themed festival, many citizens agreed on the name for this object.	JPL · 72012
72021 Yisunji	2000 XJ_{15}	Yi Sunji (1406–1465) was a Korean astronomer during the Chosun Dynasty who took Chosun's calendrical astronomy to the global level. His publication of two astronomy books, Chiljeongsan-naepyeon and Chiljeongsan-oepyeon enabled Chosun to carry out astronomical activities its own way.	JPL · 72021
72037 Castelldefels	2000 XN_{44}	Castelldefels, a millenary city 30 km from Barcelona, visited by hundreds of thousands of tourists each year because of its beaches, good weather and historical monuments, including a castle inhabited since pre-Roman times. An active astronomical society maintains a close relationship with the Begues Observatory (Src).	JPL · 72037
72042 Dequeiroz	2000 YA_{1}	José De Queiroz (born 1954) is a Portuguese-born, Swiss amateur astronomer and discoverer of minor planets. He lives in the small Alpine town of Falera with his daughter Marcia.	JPL · 72042
72059 Heojun	2000 YC_{16}	Heo Jun (1539–1615), Korean medical scientist successfully integrated the medical traditions in Chosun and China through Donguibogam, a comprehensive oriental medicine textbook. His observation records regarding an epidemic of scarlet fever were some of the earliest and most accurate in the history of medicine.	JPL · 72059
72060 Hohhot	2000 YG_{16}	Hohhot, capital city of the province of Inner Mongolia, China	JPL · 72060
72071 Gábor	2000 YO_{33}	Dénes Gábor (1900–1979), a Hungarian-American physicist who won the 1971 Nobel Prize for Physics for his invention and development of the holographic method. He also carried out research on high-speed oscilloscopes, communication theory and physical optics, and he paid special attention to the impact of science on modern society.	JPL · 72071

== 72101–72200 ==
back to top

Named minor planet	Provisional	This minor planet was named for...	Ref · Catalog
There are no named minor planets in this number range

== 72201–72300 ==
back to top

Named minor planet	Provisional	This minor planet was named for...	Ref · Catalog
There are no named minor planets in this number range

== 72301–72400 ==
back to top

Named minor planet	Provisional	This minor planet was named for...	Ref · Catalog
There are no named minor planets in this number range

== 72401–72500 ==
back to top

Named minor planet	Provisional	This minor planet was named for...	Ref · Catalog
72432 Kimrobinson	2001 CO_{42}	Kim Stanley Robinson (born 1952), an American science fiction writer who has described human settlement of the Solar System and beyond. He has imagined social and environmental challenges facing societies living on worlds such as Mercury, Earth, Mars and the asteroids.	JPL · 72432
72447 Polińska	2001 DP	Magdalena Polińska (born 1981) is a Polish assistant professor researcher at the Adam Mickiewicz University in Poznań. She specializes in photometric observations of minor solar system bodies. Her current research interests also include stellar spectroscopy and abundance analysis. Citation provided by T. Michałowski.	JPL · 72447

== 72501–72600 ==
back to top

Named minor planet	Provisional	This minor planet was named for...	Ref · Catalog
72543 Simonemarchi	2001 DN_{106}	Simone Marchi (born 1973), an Italian astronomer and active researcher in Solar System sciences, in particular the observational and theoretical modelling of minor planets, satellites of the outer planets and meteoroid impacts on Mercury. He is also fond of sundials and engaged in the popularization of astronomy.	JPL · 72543
72545 Robbiiwessen	2001 EP	Robbii Wessen (born 1958) is an American artist and graphic designer. He has won numerous graphic-design awards including the AIGA Graphic Design Award and multiple Desi Awards. His sculptures have been shown across the United States. He is a graduate of the Parsons School of Design.	JPL · 72545
72596 Zilkha	2001 FF_{9}	Michael Zilkha (born 1954) and Nina Zilkha (born 1954), American entrepreneurs and philanthropists from Houston, Texas. Their chance visit to the George Observatory in the year 2000 led to a generous equipment grant, resulting in hundreds of discoveries of minor planets and of measurements of variable stars.	JPL · 72596

== 72601–72700 ==
back to top

Named minor planet	Provisional	This minor planet was named for...	Ref · Catalog
72632 Coralina	2001 FF_{31}	Coralina is a women's choir founded in Gnosca, Switzerland in 1980, where the Gnosca Observatory is located. It has been masterfully conducted by Francesca Gianoni Casanova since 1990. The repertoire is highly refined and is made up of pieces from different parts of the world and from various periods of music history.	JPL · 72632
72633 Randygroth	2001 FJ_{31}	Randall Groth (Randy Groth) is an associate vice president of the University of Arizona and dean of the university's South Campus in Sierra Vista. His energetic efforts were a key factor in establishing Patterson Observatory at the South Campus.	JPL · 72633

== 72701–72800 ==
back to top

Named minor planet	Provisional	This minor planet was named for...	Ref · Catalog
There are no named minor planets in this number range

== 72801–72900 ==
back to top

Named minor planet	Provisional	This minor planet was named for...	Ref · Catalog
72801 Manzanera	2001 FE_{192}	Phil Manzanera (born 1951, as Philip Geoffrey Targett-Adams) is a musician known for key contributions to such groups as Roxy Music, 801 and Quiet Sun, as well as the pursuit of his own, often experimental and ethereal guitar work. His work includes key collaborative efforts with Brian Eno, John Wetton, and David Gilmour.	JPL · 72801
72802 Wetton	2001 FT_{192}	John Kenneth Wetton (1949–2017) was a progressive rock musician who worked with many groups during his long career, including Phil Manzanera, King Crimson, Roxy Music, U.K. and Asia. His beautiful voice complemented his equally impressive technical mastery of the bass guitar.	JPL · 72802
72804 Caldentey	2001 GQ	Maria-Dolorès Caldentey Rius (born 1956), a Spanish founding member of the Observatorio Astronómico de Mallorca. In 1991 she designed and managed the construction of the observatory. During 2003–2004 she did the same for the Planetarium of Mallorca and the Observatorio Astronomico of La Sagra in Granada.	JPL · 72804
72819 Brunet	2001 HX	Joseph Brunet (born 1935) a French astronomer who was one of the three people involved in the construction of the Observatoire de Saint-Véran, following the decision to establish a new observing station by the Paris Observatory in 1974.	JPL · 72819
72827 Maxaub	2001 HT_{8}	Max Aub (1903–1972), was a Franco-Spanish writer who studied in Spain, where the civil war inspired his famous trilogy Campo cerrado (Field of Honour, 1943), Campo de sangre (1945) and Campo abierto (1951), written during his 30-year exile in Mexico.	JPL · 72827
72834 Guywells	2001 HQ_{16}	Guy Wells (born 1976) is a British-Grenadian amateur astronomer and a Fellow of the Royal Astronomical Society. He has created Northolt Branch Astro, a group of amateur astronomers who seek to increase public interest in astronomy. He provides follow-up observations of Near Earth asteroids to the Minor Planet Center.	JPL · 72834
72841 Manolaneri	2001 HC_{32}	Manola Neri (b. 1957), an Italian amateur astronomer.	IAU · 72841
72876 Vauriot	2001 KH_{2}	Pierre Vauriot (1926–1984) was a French professor of mathematics, an observer of variable stars and a popularizer of astronomy in the region Languedoc Roussillon. He was cofounder of the Astronomical Society of Montpellier and a correspondent of the Astronomical Society of France.	JPL · 72876

== 72901–73000 ==
back to top

Named minor planet	Provisional	This minor planet was named for...	Ref · Catalog
72912 Fobarsti	2001 OA_{84}	Robert E. Foster (born 1939), James C. Barnes (born 1949) and Thomas M. Stidham (1940–2019), the three band directors at the University of Kansas during the discoverer's college years.	IAU · 72912
72949 Colesanti	2002 CC_{43}	Carlos Alberto Colesanti (1945–2024), a Brazilian amateur astronomer.	IAU · 72949
72993 Hannahlivsey	2002 ES_{10}	Hannah Livsey (born 1975) is an English solicitor with a passion for classical music. She lends her time as a cellist to the Shrewsbury Symphony Orchestra.	JPL · 72993

back to top

Preceded by 71,001–72,000	Meanings of minor-planet names List of minor planets: 72,001–73,000	Succeeded by 73,001–74,000
