= List of minor planets: 72001–73000 =

The following is a partial list of minor planets, running from minor-planet number 72001 through 73000, inclusive. The primary data for this and other partial lists is based on JPL's "Small-Body Orbital Elements" and data available from the Minor Planet Center. Critical list information is also provided by the MPC, unless otherwise specified from Lowell Observatory. A detailed description of the table's columns and additional sources are given on the main page including a complete list of every page in this series, and a statistical break-up on the dynamical classification of minor planets.

Also see the summary list of all named bodies in numerical and alphabetical order, and the corresponding naming citations for the number range of this particular list. New namings may only be added to this list after official publication, as the preannouncement of names is condemned by the Working Group for Small Bodies Nomenclature of the International Astronomical Union.

Near-Earth obj.	MBA (inner)	MBA (outer)	Centaur
Mars-crosser	MBA (middle)	Jupiter trojan	Trans-Neptunian obj.
Unclassified

== 72001–72100 ==
Designation			Discovery			Properties		Ref
Permanent	Provisional	Named after	Date	Site	Discoverer(s)	Category	Diam.	Ref
72001	2000 WX_{188}	—	November 18, 2000	Anderson Mesa	LONEOS	·	3.2 km	MPC · JPL
72002	2000 WP_{191}	—	November 19, 2000	Anderson Mesa	LONEOS	·	2.4 km	MPC · JPL
72003	2000 XP_{2}	—	December 1, 2000	Socorro	LINEAR	·	1.7 km	MPC · JPL
72004	2000 XS_{3}	—	December 1, 2000	Socorro	LINEAR	·	6.1 km	MPC · JPL
72005	2000 XV_{6}	—	December 1, 2000	Socorro	LINEAR	V	1.7 km	MPC · JPL
72006	2000 XJ_{7}	—	December 1, 2000	Socorro	LINEAR	·	1.7 km	MPC · JPL
72007	2000 XM_{7}	—	December 1, 2000	Socorro	LINEAR	·	1.6 km	MPC · JPL
72008	2000 XV_{7}	—	December 1, 2000	Socorro	LINEAR	PHO	6.8 km	MPC · JPL
72009	2000 XF_{8}	—	December 1, 2000	Socorro	LINEAR	·	1.7 km	MPC · JPL
72010	2000 XZ_{8}	—	December 1, 2000	Socorro	LINEAR	·	1.8 km	MPC · JPL
72011	2000 XL_{10}	—	December 1, 2000	Socorro	LINEAR	PHO	2.8 km	MPC · JPL
72012 Terute	2000 XT_{10}	Terute	December 4, 2000	Bisei SG Center	BATTeRS	·	2.3 km	MPC · JPL
72013	2000 XN_{11}	—	December 1, 2000	Socorro	LINEAR	·	4.4 km	MPC · JPL
72014	2000 XD_{12}	—	December 4, 2000	Socorro	LINEAR	·	2.2 km	MPC · JPL
72015	2000 XC_{13}	—	December 4, 2000	Socorro	LINEAR	·	7.1 km	MPC · JPL
72016	2000 XF_{13}	—	December 4, 2000	Socorro	LINEAR	EUN	3.1 km	MPC · JPL
72017	2000 XK_{13}	—	December 4, 2000	Socorro	LINEAR	·	2.8 km	MPC · JPL
72018	2000 XN_{13}	—	December 4, 2000	Socorro	LINEAR	EUN	3.7 km	MPC · JPL
72019	2000 XV_{14}	—	December 4, 2000	Socorro	LINEAR	526	6.8 km	MPC · JPL
72020	2000 XH_{15}	—	December 5, 2000	Socorro	LINEAR	PHO	2.3 km	MPC · JPL
72021 Yisunji	2000 XJ_{15}	Yisunji	December 4, 2000	Bohyunsan	Jeon, Y.-B., Lee, B.-C.	·	2.4 km	MPC · JPL
72022	2000 XE_{22}	—	December 4, 2000	Socorro	LINEAR	V	1.9 km	MPC · JPL
72023	2000 XE_{27}	—	December 4, 2000	Socorro	LINEAR	·	1.7 km	MPC · JPL
72024	2000 XY_{28}	—	December 4, 2000	Socorro	LINEAR	·	1.8 km	MPC · JPL
72025	2000 XE_{29}	—	December 4, 2000	Socorro	LINEAR	·	1.5 km	MPC · JPL
72026	2000 XO_{29}	—	December 4, 2000	Socorro	LINEAR	·	2.1 km	MPC · JPL
72027	2000 XX_{29}	—	December 4, 2000	Socorro	LINEAR	·	1.8 km	MPC · JPL
72028	2000 XH_{30}	—	December 4, 2000	Socorro	LINEAR	·	2.1 km	MPC · JPL
72029	2000 XY_{31}	—	December 4, 2000	Socorro	LINEAR	·	1.8 km	MPC · JPL
72030	2000 XK_{33}	—	December 4, 2000	Socorro	LINEAR	PHO	5.3 km	MPC · JPL
72031	2000 XO_{34}	—	December 4, 2000	Socorro	LINEAR	EUN	3.2 km	MPC · JPL
72032	2000 XF_{35}	—	December 4, 2000	Socorro	LINEAR	·	8.2 km	MPC · JPL
72033	2000 XQ_{35}	—	December 4, 2000	Socorro	LINEAR	MAR	3.0 km	MPC · JPL
72034	2000 XS_{35}	—	December 5, 2000	Socorro	LINEAR	PHO	3.3 km	MPC · JPL
72035	2000 XR_{38}	—	December 6, 2000	Bisei SG Center	BATTeRS	·	2.4 km	MPC · JPL
72036	2000 XM_{44}	—	December 9, 2000	Fountain Hills	C. W. Juels	PHO · moon	2.7 km	MPC · JPL
72037 Castelldefels	2000 XN_{44}	Castelldefels	December 10, 2000	Begues	Manteca, J.	·	2.0 km	MPC · JPL
72038	2000 XM_{48}	—	December 4, 2000	Socorro	LINEAR	·	3.2 km	MPC · JPL
72039	2000 XG_{49}	—	December 4, 2000	Socorro	LINEAR	·	2.2 km	MPC · JPL
72040	2000 XH_{50}	—	December 4, 2000	Socorro	LINEAR	·	3.3 km	MPC · JPL
72041	2000 XX_{53}	—	December 15, 2000	Uccle	T. Pauwels	·	3.0 km	MPC · JPL
72042 Dequeiroz	2000 YA_{1}	Dequeiroz	December 17, 2000	Gnosca	S. Sposetti	·	3.5 km	MPC · JPL
72043	2000 YR_{2}	—	December 19, 2000	Socorro	LINEAR	·	2.5 km	MPC · JPL
72044	2000 YH_{5}	—	December 20, 2000	Socorro	LINEAR	·	1.4 km	MPC · JPL
72045	2000 YJ_{6}	—	December 20, 2000	Socorro	LINEAR	·	2.9 km	MPC · JPL
72046	2000 YV_{6}	—	December 20, 2000	Socorro	LINEAR	·	2.4 km	MPC · JPL
72047	2000 YZ_{6}	—	December 20, 2000	Socorro	LINEAR	ERI	4.4 km	MPC · JPL
72048	2000 YC_{7}	—	December 20, 2000	Socorro	LINEAR	·	3.0 km	MPC · JPL
72049	2000 YH_{7}	—	December 20, 2000	Socorro	LINEAR	·	2.4 km	MPC · JPL
72050	2000 YM_{7}	—	December 20, 2000	Socorro	LINEAR	V	1.6 km	MPC · JPL
72051	2000 YS_{7}	—	December 21, 2000	Socorro	LINEAR	·	5.3 km	MPC · JPL
72052	2000 YW_{7}	—	December 21, 2000	Socorro	LINEAR	·	3.1 km	MPC · JPL
72053	2000 YX_{7}	—	December 21, 2000	Socorro	LINEAR	·	1.9 km	MPC · JPL
72054	2000 YB_{8}	—	December 21, 2000	Farpoint	G. Hug	·	2.7 km	MPC · JPL
72055	2000 YF_{8}	—	December 22, 2000	Višnjan Observatory	K. Korlević	·	4.0 km	MPC · JPL
72056	2000 YT_{8}	—	December 19, 2000	Kitt Peak	Spacewatch	·	1.8 km	MPC · JPL
72057	2000 YS_{9}	—	December 23, 2000	Starkenburg Observatory	Starkenburg	·	3.9 km	MPC · JPL
72058	2000 YC_{15}	—	December 21, 2000	Uccle	T. Pauwels	NYS ·	4.0 km	MPC · JPL
72059 Heojun	2000 YC_{16}	Heojun	December 21, 2000	Bohyunsan	Jeon, Y.-B., Lee, B.-C.	·	2.2 km	MPC · JPL
72060 Hohhot	2000 YG_{16}	Hohhot	December 23, 2000	Desert Beaver	W. K. Y. Yeung	NYS	3.2 km	MPC · JPL
72061	2000 YX_{16}	—	December 21, 2000	Socorro	LINEAR	·	2.2 km	MPC · JPL
72062	2000 YR_{17}	—	December 24, 2000	Ondřejov	P. Kušnirák, U. Babiaková	V	1.8 km	MPC · JPL
72063	2000 YD_{18}	—	December 20, 2000	Socorro	LINEAR	V	1.8 km	MPC · JPL
72064	2000 YG_{19}	—	December 21, 2000	Kitt Peak	Spacewatch	·	1.6 km	MPC · JPL
72065	2000 YM_{20}	—	December 27, 2000	Kitt Peak	Spacewatch	·	1.8 km	MPC · JPL
72066	2000 YX_{21}	—	December 29, 2000	Desert Beaver	W. K. Y. Yeung	MAR	3.8 km	MPC · JPL
72067	2000 YX_{26}	—	December 25, 2000	Haleakala	NEAT	·	7.4 km	MPC · JPL
72068	2000 YC_{29}	—	December 31, 2000	Ametlla de Mar	J. Nomen	·	1.8 km	MPC · JPL
72069	2000 YD_{29}	—	December 31, 2000	Ametlla de Mar	J. Nomen	·	2.8 km	MPC · JPL
72070	2000 YC_{33}	—	December 31, 2000	Ondřejov	P. Kušnirák, U. Babiaková	·	1.7 km	MPC · JPL
72071 Gábor	2000 YO_{33}	Gábor	December 31, 2000	Piszkéstető	K. Sárneczky, L. Kiss	·	2.5 km	MPC · JPL
72072	2000 YS_{34}	—	December 28, 2000	Socorro	LINEAR	·	3.4 km	MPC · JPL
72073	2000 YE_{35}	—	December 28, 2000	Socorro	LINEAR	·	2.0 km	MPC · JPL
72074	2000 YV_{35}	—	December 30, 2000	Socorro	LINEAR	·	3.8 km	MPC · JPL
72075	2000 YN_{36}	—	December 30, 2000	Socorro	LINEAR	·	3.0 km	MPC · JPL
72076	2000 YO_{37}	—	December 30, 2000	Socorro	LINEAR	MAS	1.6 km	MPC · JPL
72077	2000 YA_{38}	—	December 30, 2000	Socorro	LINEAR	·	1.9 km	MPC · JPL
72078	2000 YJ_{39}	—	December 30, 2000	Socorro	LINEAR	·	2.5 km	MPC · JPL
72079	2000 YR_{39}	—	December 30, 2000	Socorro	LINEAR	·	2.8 km	MPC · JPL
72080	2000 YY_{39}	—	December 30, 2000	Socorro	LINEAR	·	2.6 km	MPC · JPL
72081	2000 YZ_{39}	—	December 30, 2000	Socorro	LINEAR	NYS	2.5 km	MPC · JPL
72082	2000 YG_{40}	—	December 30, 2000	Socorro	LINEAR	·	1.7 km	MPC · JPL
72083	2000 YP_{40}	—	December 30, 2000	Socorro	LINEAR	·	1.6 km	MPC · JPL
72084	2000 YB_{41}	—	December 30, 2000	Socorro	LINEAR	V	1.6 km	MPC · JPL
72085	2000 YH_{41}	—	December 30, 2000	Socorro	LINEAR	·	2.2 km	MPC · JPL
72086	2000 YM_{41}	—	December 30, 2000	Socorro	LINEAR	V	1.5 km	MPC · JPL
72087	2000 YP_{41}	—	December 30, 2000	Socorro	LINEAR	·	1.1 km	MPC · JPL
72088	2000 YZ_{41}	—	December 30, 2000	Socorro	LINEAR	·	2.2 km	MPC · JPL
72089	2000 YP_{43}	—	December 30, 2000	Socorro	LINEAR	·	2.1 km	MPC · JPL
72090	2000 YL_{45}	—	December 30, 2000	Socorro	LINEAR	·	2.1 km	MPC · JPL
72091	2000 YY_{45}	—	December 30, 2000	Socorro	LINEAR	·	1.9 km	MPC · JPL
72092	2000 YD_{46}	—	December 30, 2000	Socorro	LINEAR	·	2.5 km	MPC · JPL
72093	2000 YL_{46}	—	December 30, 2000	Socorro	LINEAR	MAS	1.7 km	MPC · JPL
72094	2000 YM_{47}	—	December 30, 2000	Socorro	LINEAR	slow	4.8 km	MPC · JPL
72095	2000 YY_{47}	—	December 30, 2000	Socorro	LINEAR	·	6.4 km	MPC · JPL
72096	2000 YA_{48}	—	December 30, 2000	Socorro	LINEAR	·	2.6 km	MPC · JPL
72097	2000 YL_{49}	—	December 30, 2000	Socorro	LINEAR	·	2.8 km	MPC · JPL
72098	2000 YY_{49}	—	December 30, 2000	Socorro	LINEAR	·	2.9 km	MPC · JPL
72099	2000 YQ_{50}	—	December 30, 2000	Socorro	LINEAR	·	2.0 km	MPC · JPL
72100	2000 YA_{51}	—	December 30, 2000	Socorro	LINEAR	·	2.1 km	MPC · JPL

== 72101–72200 ==
back to top

Designation			Discovery			Properties		Ref
Permanent	Provisional	Named after	Date	Site	Discoverer(s)	Category	Diam.	Ref
72101	2000 YB_{51}	—	December 30, 2000	Socorro	LINEAR	NYS	1.9 km	MPC · JPL
72102	2000 YB_{52}	—	December 30, 2000	Socorro	LINEAR	NYS ·	3.6 km	MPC · JPL
72103	2000 YK_{52}	—	December 30, 2000	Socorro	LINEAR	·	2.6 km	MPC · JPL
72104	2000 YU_{52}	—	December 30, 2000	Socorro	LINEAR	·	2.4 km	MPC · JPL
72105	2000 YO_{53}	—	December 30, 2000	Socorro	LINEAR	NYS ·	4.2 km	MPC · JPL
72106	2000 YD_{54}	—	December 30, 2000	Socorro	LINEAR	·	3.3 km	MPC · JPL
72107	2000 YL_{54}	—	December 30, 2000	Socorro	LINEAR	·	2.6 km	MPC · JPL
72108	2000 YT_{54}	—	December 30, 2000	Socorro	LINEAR	·	2.9 km	MPC · JPL
72109	2000 YF_{55}	—	December 30, 2000	Socorro	LINEAR	·	5.0 km	MPC · JPL
72110	2000 YR_{55}	—	December 30, 2000	Socorro	LINEAR	·	1.3 km	MPC · JPL
72111	2000 YH_{56}	—	December 30, 2000	Socorro	LINEAR	·	1.4 km	MPC · JPL
72112	2000 YX_{57}	—	December 30, 2000	Socorro	LINEAR	·	1.8 km	MPC · JPL
72113	2000 YO_{58}	—	December 30, 2000	Socorro	LINEAR	·	1.9 km	MPC · JPL
72114	2000 YJ_{60}	—	December 30, 2000	Socorro	LINEAR	·	2.9 km	MPC · JPL
72115	2000 YQ_{61}	—	December 30, 2000	Socorro	LINEAR	·	3.4 km	MPC · JPL
72116	2000 YS_{62}	—	December 30, 2000	Socorro	LINEAR	·	2.9 km	MPC · JPL
72117	2000 YU_{62}	—	December 30, 2000	Socorro	LINEAR	·	1.9 km	MPC · JPL
72118	2000 YK_{63}	—	December 30, 2000	Socorro	LINEAR	·	3.9 km	MPC · JPL
72119	2000 YL_{63}	—	December 30, 2000	Socorro	LINEAR	·	5.9 km	MPC · JPL
72120	2000 YP_{63}	—	December 30, 2000	Socorro	LINEAR	·	3.0 km	MPC · JPL
72121	2000 YT_{63}	—	December 30, 2000	Socorro	LINEAR	V	1.4 km	MPC · JPL
72122	2000 YV_{63}	—	December 30, 2000	Socorro	LINEAR	·	2.8 km	MPC · JPL
72123	2000 YP_{65}	—	December 16, 2000	Kitt Peak	Spacewatch	·	3.6 km	MPC · JPL
72124	2000 YX_{67}	—	December 28, 2000	Socorro	LINEAR	·	2.4 km	MPC · JPL
72125	2000 YP_{68}	—	December 28, 2000	Socorro	LINEAR	NYS	2.7 km	MPC · JPL
72126	2000 YQ_{68}	—	December 28, 2000	Socorro	LINEAR	·	6.2 km	MPC · JPL
72127	2000 YS_{71}	—	December 30, 2000	Socorro	LINEAR	V	1.7 km	MPC · JPL
72128	2000 YW_{72}	—	December 30, 2000	Socorro	LINEAR	·	1.3 km	MPC · JPL
72129	2000 YP_{73}	—	December 30, 2000	Socorro	LINEAR	V	1.3 km	MPC · JPL
72130	2000 YV_{74}	—	December 30, 2000	Socorro	LINEAR	·	3.2 km	MPC · JPL
72131	2000 YA_{75}	—	December 30, 2000	Socorro	LINEAR	·	2.3 km	MPC · JPL
72132	2000 YY_{75}	—	December 30, 2000	Socorro	LINEAR	·	3.1 km	MPC · JPL
72133	2000 YB_{77}	—	December 30, 2000	Socorro	LINEAR	V	1.8 km	MPC · JPL
72134	2000 YL_{77}	—	December 30, 2000	Socorro	LINEAR	·	2.1 km	MPC · JPL
72135	2000 YS_{79}	—	December 30, 2000	Socorro	LINEAR	NYS	2.4 km	MPC · JPL
72136	2000 YG_{80}	—	December 30, 2000	Socorro	LINEAR	(2076)	2.9 km	MPC · JPL
72137	2000 YT_{81}	—	December 30, 2000	Socorro	LINEAR	NYS	2.4 km	MPC · JPL
72138	2000 YQ_{84}	—	December 30, 2000	Socorro	LINEAR	·	2.0 km	MPC · JPL
72139	2000 YS_{84}	—	December 30, 2000	Socorro	LINEAR	NYS	6.9 km	MPC · JPL
72140	2000 YD_{85}	—	December 30, 2000	Socorro	LINEAR	·	7.4 km	MPC · JPL
72141	2000 YL_{85}	—	December 30, 2000	Socorro	LINEAR	V	1.8 km	MPC · JPL
72142	2000 YS_{85}	—	December 30, 2000	Socorro	LINEAR	·	2.3 km	MPC · JPL
72143	2000 YQ_{86}	—	December 30, 2000	Socorro	LINEAR	ERI	4.7 km	MPC · JPL
72144	2000 YZ_{86}	—	December 30, 2000	Socorro	LINEAR	·	1.7 km	MPC · JPL
72145	2000 YD_{87}	—	December 30, 2000	Socorro	LINEAR	V	1.8 km	MPC · JPL
72146	2000 YV_{87}	—	December 30, 2000	Socorro	LINEAR	NYS	3.3 km	MPC · JPL
72147	2000 YP_{90}	—	December 30, 2000	Socorro	LINEAR	·	1.8 km	MPC · JPL
72148	2000 YY_{91}	—	December 30, 2000	Socorro	LINEAR	NYS ·	4.1 km	MPC · JPL
72149	2000 YX_{92}	—	December 30, 2000	Socorro	LINEAR	·	3.9 km	MPC · JPL
72150	2000 YO_{93}	—	December 30, 2000	Socorro	LINEAR	·	3.2 km	MPC · JPL
72151	2000 YL_{96}	—	December 30, 2000	Socorro	LINEAR	·	2.3 km	MPC · JPL
72152	2000 YY_{96}	—	December 30, 2000	Socorro	LINEAR	MAS	1.4 km	MPC · JPL
72153	2000 YE_{97}	—	December 30, 2000	Socorro	LINEAR	·	2.2 km	MPC · JPL
72154	2000 YY_{97}	—	December 30, 2000	Socorro	LINEAR	·	1.9 km	MPC · JPL
72155	2000 YM_{98}	—	December 30, 2000	Socorro	LINEAR	LEO	5.1 km	MPC · JPL
72156	2000 YJ_{99}	—	December 30, 2000	Socorro	LINEAR	·	4.6 km	MPC · JPL
72157	2000 YR_{99}	—	December 30, 2000	Socorro	LINEAR	NYS	2.0 km	MPC · JPL
72158	2000 YU_{99}	—	December 30, 2000	Socorro	LINEAR	·	2.5 km	MPC · JPL
72159	2000 YY_{101}	—	December 28, 2000	Socorro	LINEAR	·	2.9 km	MPC · JPL
72160	2000 YH_{102}	—	December 28, 2000	Socorro	LINEAR	V	1.5 km	MPC · JPL
72161	2000 YZ_{102}	—	December 28, 2000	Socorro	LINEAR	TIR	8.7 km	MPC · JPL
72162	2000 YK_{103}	—	December 28, 2000	Socorro	LINEAR	·	3.0 km	MPC · JPL
72163	2000 YG_{104}	—	December 28, 2000	Socorro	LINEAR	·	3.2 km	MPC · JPL
72164	2000 YL_{104}	—	December 28, 2000	Socorro	LINEAR	EUN	4.2 km	MPC · JPL
72165	2000 YJ_{105}	—	December 28, 2000	Socorro	LINEAR	·	3.9 km	MPC · JPL
72166	2000 YL_{105}	—	December 28, 2000	Socorro	LINEAR	·	5.4 km	MPC · JPL
72167	2000 YX_{106}	—	December 30, 2000	Socorro	LINEAR	·	5.1 km	MPC · JPL
72168	2000 YL_{107}	—	December 30, 2000	Socorro	LINEAR	·	1.4 km	MPC · JPL
72169	2000 YW_{107}	—	December 30, 2000	Socorro	LINEAR	SUL	4.4 km	MPC · JPL
72170	2000 YU_{108}	—	December 30, 2000	Socorro	LINEAR	·	2.6 km	MPC · JPL
72171	2000 YW_{108}	—	December 30, 2000	Socorro	LINEAR	·	3.6 km	MPC · JPL
72172	2000 YB_{109}	—	December 30, 2000	Socorro	LINEAR	·	1.9 km	MPC · JPL
72173	2000 YC_{109}	—	December 30, 2000	Socorro	LINEAR	·	1.5 km	MPC · JPL
72174	2000 YO_{109}	—	December 30, 2000	Socorro	LINEAR	·	2.5 km	MPC · JPL
72175	2000 YD_{110}	—	December 30, 2000	Socorro	LINEAR	·	2.3 km	MPC · JPL
72176	2000 YQ_{110}	—	December 30, 2000	Socorro	LINEAR	·	2.5 km	MPC · JPL
72177	2000 YR_{110}	—	December 30, 2000	Socorro	LINEAR	·	3.4 km	MPC · JPL
72178	2000 YE_{113}	—	December 30, 2000	Socorro	LINEAR	·	1.9 km	MPC · JPL
72179	2000 YH_{113}	—	December 30, 2000	Socorro	LINEAR	·	1.8 km	MPC · JPL
72180	2000 YT_{114}	—	December 30, 2000	Socorro	LINEAR	NYS	2.6 km	MPC · JPL
72181	2000 YU_{115}	—	December 30, 2000	Socorro	LINEAR	·	1.8 km	MPC · JPL
72182	2000 YZ_{115}	—	December 30, 2000	Socorro	LINEAR	NYS	2.6 km	MPC · JPL
72183	2000 YB_{117}	—	December 30, 2000	Socorro	LINEAR	NYS	3.1 km	MPC · JPL
72184	2000 YH_{117}	—	December 30, 2000	Socorro	LINEAR	·	2.3 km	MPC · JPL
72185	2000 YK_{117}	—	December 30, 2000	Socorro	LINEAR	·	3.7 km	MPC · JPL
72186	2000 YH_{118}	—	December 30, 2000	Socorro	LINEAR	·	3.7 km	MPC · JPL
72187	2000 YM_{120}	—	December 19, 2000	Socorro	LINEAR	·	2.2 km	MPC · JPL
72188	2000 YU_{120}	—	December 19, 2000	Haleakala	NEAT	EUN	5.0 km	MPC · JPL
72189	2000 YA_{121}	—	December 21, 2000	Socorro	LINEAR	·	2.2 km	MPC · JPL
72190	2000 YG_{124}	—	December 29, 2000	Anderson Mesa	LONEOS	·	2.0 km	MPC · JPL
72191	2000 YT_{125}	—	December 29, 2000	Anderson Mesa	LONEOS	·	3.1 km	MPC · JPL
72192	2000 YZ_{125}	—	December 29, 2000	Anderson Mesa	LONEOS	·	2.9 km	MPC · JPL
72193	2000 YX_{127}	—	December 29, 2000	Kitt Peak	Spacewatch	·	2.6 km	MPC · JPL
72194	2000 YA_{128}	—	December 29, 2000	Kitt Peak	Spacewatch	·	3.2 km	MPC · JPL
72195	2000 YD_{128}	—	December 29, 2000	Haleakala	NEAT	·	2.7 km	MPC · JPL
72196	2000 YO_{128}	—	December 29, 2000	Haleakala	NEAT	·	2.5 km	MPC · JPL
72197	2000 YT_{128}	—	December 29, 2000	Haleakala	NEAT	(1338) (FLO)	1.4 km	MPC · JPL
72198	2000 YY_{129}	—	December 30, 2000	Socorro	LINEAR	·	1.7 km	MPC · JPL
72199	2000 YM_{132}	—	December 30, 2000	Anderson Mesa	LONEOS	·	2.7 km	MPC · JPL
72200	2000 YQ_{132}	—	December 30, 2000	Anderson Mesa	LONEOS	·	7.1 km	MPC · JPL

== 72201–72300 ==
back to top

Designation			Discovery			Properties		Ref
Permanent	Provisional	Named after	Date	Site	Discoverer(s)	Category	Diam.	Ref
72201	2000 YX_{132}	—	December 30, 2000	Kitt Peak	Spacewatch	·	2.2 km	MPC · JPL
72202	2000 YY_{132}	—	December 30, 2000	Kitt Peak	Spacewatch	·	4.7 km	MPC · JPL
72203	2000 YJ_{133}	—	December 31, 2000	Anderson Mesa	LONEOS	·	2.6 km	MPC · JPL
72204	2000 YV_{133}	—	December 31, 2000	Kitt Peak	Spacewatch	·	2.6 km	MPC · JPL
72205	2000 YO_{137}	—	December 23, 2000	Socorro	LINEAR	·	1.9 km	MPC · JPL
72206	2000 YL_{139}	—	December 27, 2000	Anderson Mesa	LONEOS	·	3.0 km	MPC · JPL
72207	2000 YM_{139}	—	December 27, 2000	Anderson Mesa	LONEOS	(5)	3.1 km	MPC · JPL
72208	2000 YP_{139}	—	December 27, 2000	Anderson Mesa	LONEOS	MAR	3.0 km	MPC · JPL
72209	2000 YD_{143}	—	December 19, 2000	Haleakala	NEAT	·	2.5 km	MPC · JPL
72210	2001 AK	—	January 1, 2001	Kitt Peak	Spacewatch	·	2.1 km	MPC · JPL
72211	2001 AS	—	January 2, 2001	Oizumi	T. Kobayashi	·	2.4 km	MPC · JPL
72212	2001 AT	—	January 2, 2001	Oizumi	T. Kobayashi	MAS	1.9 km	MPC · JPL
72213	2001 AU	—	January 2, 2001	Oizumi	T. Kobayashi	·	4.8 km	MPC · JPL
72214	2001 AM_{3}	—	January 2, 2001	Socorro	LINEAR	·	2.9 km	MPC · JPL
72215	2001 AJ_{4}	—	January 2, 2001	Socorro	LINEAR	·	2.3 km	MPC · JPL
72216	2001 AG_{5}	—	January 2, 2001	Socorro	LINEAR	·	3.1 km	MPC · JPL
72217	2001 AQ_{5}	—	January 2, 2001	Socorro	LINEAR	ADE	5.7 km	MPC · JPL
72218	2001 AL_{6}	—	January 2, 2001	Socorro	LINEAR	·	2.5 km	MPC · JPL
72219	2001 AC_{7}	—	January 2, 2001	Socorro	LINEAR	·	2.3 km	MPC · JPL
72220	2001 AJ_{9}	—	January 2, 2001	Socorro	LINEAR	·	1.6 km	MPC · JPL
72221	2001 AY_{9}	—	January 2, 2001	Socorro	LINEAR	·	1.9 km	MPC · JPL
72222	2001 AD_{10}	—	January 2, 2001	Socorro	LINEAR	·	2.4 km	MPC · JPL
72223	2001 AM_{10}	—	January 2, 2001	Socorro	LINEAR	·	2.5 km	MPC · JPL
72224	2001 AN_{11}	—	January 2, 2001	Socorro	LINEAR	·	2.2 km	MPC · JPL
72225	2001 AP_{12}	—	January 2, 2001	Socorro	LINEAR	(883)	1.5 km	MPC · JPL
72226	2001 AJ_{13}	—	January 2, 2001	Socorro	LINEAR	·	2.4 km	MPC · JPL
72227	2001 AA_{14}	—	January 2, 2001	Socorro	LINEAR	·	1.9 km	MPC · JPL
72228	2001 AR_{14}	—	January 2, 2001	Socorro	LINEAR	·	3.5 km	MPC · JPL
72229	2001 AK_{15}	—	January 2, 2001	Socorro	LINEAR	PHO	2.5 km	MPC · JPL
72230	2001 AN_{15}	—	January 2, 2001	Socorro	LINEAR	slow	4.7 km	MPC · JPL
72231	2001 AC_{16}	—	January 2, 2001	Socorro	LINEAR	NYS ·	4.4 km	MPC · JPL
72232	2001 AD_{16}	—	January 2, 2001	Socorro	LINEAR	V	1.5 km	MPC · JPL
72233	2001 AJ_{16}	—	January 2, 2001	Socorro	LINEAR	·	2.8 km	MPC · JPL
72234	2001 AR_{16}	—	January 2, 2001	Socorro	LINEAR	·	2.5 km	MPC · JPL
72235	2001 AA_{17}	—	January 2, 2001	Socorro	LINEAR	·	2.0 km	MPC · JPL
72236	2001 AD_{19}	—	January 4, 2001	Haleakala	NEAT	·	6.2 km	MPC · JPL
72237	2001 AX_{20}	—	January 3, 2001	Socorro	LINEAR	·	1.7 km	MPC · JPL
72238	2001 AE_{21}	—	January 3, 2001	Socorro	LINEAR	·	1.7 km	MPC · JPL
72239	2001 AF_{21}	—	January 3, 2001	Socorro	LINEAR	·	3.0 km	MPC · JPL
72240	2001 AL_{21}	—	January 3, 2001	Socorro	LINEAR	·	2.9 km	MPC · JPL
72241	2001 AN_{23}	—	January 3, 2001	Socorro	LINEAR	·	2.1 km	MPC · JPL
72242	2001 AT_{23}	—	January 3, 2001	Socorro	LINEAR	·	2.8 km	MPC · JPL
72243	2001 AW_{24}	—	January 4, 2001	Socorro	LINEAR	·	2.6 km	MPC · JPL
72244	2001 AH_{25}	—	January 4, 2001	Socorro	LINEAR	GEF	4.1 km	MPC · JPL
72245	2001 AS_{25}	—	January 5, 2001	Socorro	LINEAR	·	1.9 km	MPC · JPL
72246	2001 AL_{26}	—	January 5, 2001	Socorro	LINEAR	V	1.9 km	MPC · JPL
72247	2001 AH_{27}	—	January 5, 2001	Socorro	LINEAR	·	2.4 km	MPC · JPL
72248	2001 AL_{28}	—	January 6, 2001	Socorro	LINEAR	PHO	2.0 km	MPC · JPL
72249	2001 AX_{28}	—	January 4, 2001	Socorro	LINEAR	·	1.9 km	MPC · JPL
72250	2001 AO_{29}	—	January 4, 2001	Socorro	LINEAR	·	2.9 km	MPC · JPL
72251	2001 AJ_{31}	—	January 4, 2001	Socorro	LINEAR	·	3.4 km	MPC · JPL
72252	2001 AQ_{31}	—	January 4, 2001	Socorro	LINEAR	·	1.9 km	MPC · JPL
72253	2001 AT_{31}	—	January 4, 2001	Socorro	LINEAR	·	1.8 km	MPC · JPL
72254	2001 AW_{31}	—	January 4, 2001	Socorro	LINEAR	·	3.4 km	MPC · JPL
72255	2001 AZ_{31}	—	January 4, 2001	Socorro	LINEAR	·	3.6 km	MPC · JPL
72256	2001 AQ_{32}	—	January 4, 2001	Socorro	LINEAR	·	2.7 km	MPC · JPL
72257	2001 AV_{32}	—	January 4, 2001	Socorro	LINEAR	·	3.0 km	MPC · JPL
72258	2001 AW_{32}	—	January 4, 2001	Socorro	LINEAR	·	1.9 km	MPC · JPL
72259	2001 AY_{32}	—	January 4, 2001	Socorro	LINEAR	V	1.7 km	MPC · JPL
72260	2001 AQ_{33}	—	January 4, 2001	Socorro	LINEAR	·	2.0 km	MPC · JPL
72261	2001 AC_{34}	—	January 4, 2001	Socorro	LINEAR	·	1.6 km	MPC · JPL
72262	2001 AD_{35}	—	January 5, 2001	Socorro	LINEAR	slow	2.8 km	MPC · JPL
72263	2001 AG_{35}	—	January 5, 2001	Socorro	LINEAR	V	1.9 km	MPC · JPL
72264	2001 AE_{38}	—	January 5, 2001	Socorro	LINEAR	MAR	4.9 km	MPC · JPL
72265	2001 AJ_{41}	—	January 3, 2001	Socorro	LINEAR	·	2.2 km	MPC · JPL
72266	2001 AL_{41}	—	January 3, 2001	Socorro	LINEAR	·	3.6 km	MPC · JPL
72267	2001 AN_{41}	—	January 3, 2001	Socorro	LINEAR	·	3.6 km	MPC · JPL
72268	2001 AO_{41}	—	January 3, 2001	Socorro	LINEAR	·	1.8 km	MPC · JPL
72269	2001 AQ_{41}	—	January 3, 2001	Socorro	LINEAR	·	1.7 km	MPC · JPL
72270	2001 AQ_{42}	—	January 4, 2001	Anderson Mesa	LONEOS	·	2.8 km	MPC · JPL
72271	2001 AS_{42}	—	January 4, 2001	Anderson Mesa	LONEOS	·	1.9 km	MPC · JPL
72272	2001 AQ_{43}	—	January 4, 2001	Anderson Mesa	LONEOS	·	2.2 km	MPC · JPL
72273	2001 AR_{44}	—	January 15, 2001	Oizumi	T. Kobayashi	NYS ·	4.2 km	MPC · JPL
72274	2001 AB_{45}	—	January 15, 2001	Oizumi	T. Kobayashi	GEF	3.0 km	MPC · JPL
72275	2001 AE_{45}	—	January 15, 2001	Oizumi	T. Kobayashi	·	1.8 km	MPC · JPL
72276	2001 AN_{45}	—	January 5, 2001	Socorro	LINEAR	V	2.4 km	MPC · JPL
72277	2001 AZ_{49}	—	January 15, 2001	Kitt Peak	Spacewatch	·	2.7 km	MPC · JPL
72278	2001 AZ_{51}	—	January 12, 2001	Kvistaberg	Uppsala-DLR Asteroid Survey	·	3.7 km	MPC · JPL
72279	2001 BT	—	January 17, 2001	Oizumi	T. Kobayashi	·	2.9 km	MPC · JPL
72280	2001 BJ_{2}	—	January 16, 2001	Haleakala	NEAT	EUN	3.0 km	MPC · JPL
72281	2001 BF_{4}	—	January 18, 2001	Socorro	LINEAR	V	1.8 km	MPC · JPL
72282	2001 BH_{6}	—	January 19, 2001	Socorro	LINEAR	·	4.2 km	MPC · JPL
72283	2001 BT_{7}	—	January 19, 2001	Socorro	LINEAR	·	2.1 km	MPC · JPL
72284	2001 BG_{8}	—	January 19, 2001	Socorro	LINEAR	·	2.7 km	MPC · JPL
72285	2001 BJ_{9}	—	January 19, 2001	Socorro	LINEAR	·	2.9 km	MPC · JPL
72286	2001 BL_{9}	—	January 19, 2001	Socorro	LINEAR	·	3.1 km	MPC · JPL
72287	2001 BA_{11}	—	January 16, 2001	Haleakala	NEAT	·	2.8 km	MPC · JPL
72288	2001 BC_{13}	—	January 21, 2001	Socorro	LINEAR	·	3.1 km	MPC · JPL
72289	2001 BW_{14}	—	January 21, 2001	Oizumi	T. Kobayashi	·	3.7 km	MPC · JPL
72290	2001 BQ_{15}	—	January 21, 2001	Oizumi	T. Kobayashi	·	4.4 km	MPC · JPL
72291	2001 BA_{17}	—	January 18, 2001	Socorro	LINEAR	·	2.7 km	MPC · JPL
72292	2001 BE_{22}	—	January 20, 2001	Socorro	LINEAR	·	4.6 km	MPC · JPL
72293	2001 BH_{22}	—	January 20, 2001	Socorro	LINEAR	NYS	2.2 km	MPC · JPL
72294	2001 BG_{23}	—	January 20, 2001	Socorro	LINEAR	MAS	1.7 km	MPC · JPL
72295	2001 BO_{24}	—	January 20, 2001	Socorro	LINEAR	fast?	1.7 km	MPC · JPL
72296	2001 BX_{24}	—	January 20, 2001	Socorro	LINEAR	NYS	2.1 km	MPC · JPL
72297	2001 BV_{26}	—	January 20, 2001	Socorro	LINEAR	·	2.0 km	MPC · JPL
72298	2001 BT_{28}	—	January 20, 2001	Socorro	LINEAR	V	1.3 km	MPC · JPL
72299	2001 BC_{29}	—	January 20, 2001	Socorro	LINEAR	·	1.4 km	MPC · JPL
72300	2001 BM_{29}	—	January 20, 2001	Socorro	LINEAR	·	6.0 km	MPC · JPL

== 72301–72400 ==
back to top

Designation			Discovery			Properties		Ref
Permanent	Provisional	Named after	Date	Site	Discoverer(s)	Category	Diam.	Ref
72301	2001 BS_{30}	—	January 20, 2001	Socorro	LINEAR	·	5.4 km	MPC · JPL
72302	2001 BD_{31}	—	January 20, 2001	Socorro	LINEAR	NYS	1.4 km	MPC · JPL
72303	2001 BU_{31}	—	January 20, 2001	Socorro	LINEAR	MAR	3.9 km	MPC · JPL
72304	2001 BC_{32}	—	January 20, 2001	Socorro	LINEAR	V	1.6 km	MPC · JPL
72305	2001 BB_{34}	—	January 20, 2001	Socorro	LINEAR	THM	7.0 km	MPC · JPL
72306	2001 BF_{34}	—	January 20, 2001	Socorro	LINEAR	·	2.5 km	MPC · JPL
72307	2001 BT_{34}	—	January 20, 2001	Socorro	LINEAR	·	2.2 km	MPC · JPL
72308	2001 BZ_{34}	—	January 20, 2001	Socorro	LINEAR	ERI · slow	4.0 km	MPC · JPL
72309	2001 BJ_{36}	—	January 19, 2001	Socorro	LINEAR	V	1.4 km	MPC · JPL
72310	2001 BV_{39}	—	January 23, 2001	Kitt Peak	Spacewatch	·	8.7 km	MPC · JPL
72311	2001 BU_{40}	—	January 21, 2001	Socorro	LINEAR	·	3.4 km	MPC · JPL
72312	2001 BE_{43}	—	January 19, 2001	Socorro	LINEAR	·	2.0 km	MPC · JPL
72313	2001 BM_{43}	—	January 19, 2001	Socorro	LINEAR	·	2.0 km	MPC · JPL
72314	2001 BR_{43}	—	January 19, 2001	Socorro	LINEAR	·	4.0 km	MPC · JPL
72315	2001 BS_{44}	—	January 19, 2001	Socorro	LINEAR	·	3.5 km	MPC · JPL
72316	2001 BX_{44}	—	January 19, 2001	Socorro	LINEAR	·	2.3 km	MPC · JPL
72317	2001 BA_{45}	—	January 19, 2001	Socorro	LINEAR	·	2.3 km	MPC · JPL
72318	2001 BN_{47}	—	January 21, 2001	Socorro	LINEAR	·	2.3 km	MPC · JPL
72319	2001 BS_{47}	—	January 21, 2001	Socorro	LINEAR	HYG	6.1 km	MPC · JPL
72320	2001 BW_{47}	—	January 21, 2001	Socorro	LINEAR	·	3.4 km	MPC · JPL
72321	2001 BJ_{48}	—	January 21, 2001	Socorro	LINEAR	·	4.0 km	MPC · JPL
72322	2001 BB_{49}	—	January 21, 2001	Socorro	LINEAR	EUN	3.1 km	MPC · JPL
72323	2001 BQ_{50}	—	January 27, 2001	Oaxaca	Roe, J. M.	EUN	2.7 km	MPC · JPL
72324	2001 BM_{54}	—	January 18, 2001	Kitt Peak	Spacewatch	·	6.2 km	MPC · JPL
72325	2001 BT_{55}	—	January 19, 2001	Socorro	LINEAR	·	4.0 km	MPC · JPL
72326	2001 BL_{56}	—	January 19, 2001	Socorro	LINEAR	NYS	1.7 km	MPC · JPL
72327	2001 BG_{59}	—	January 21, 2001	Socorro	LINEAR	·	2.3 km	MPC · JPL
72328	2001 BP_{59}	—	January 26, 2001	Socorro	LINEAR	·	2.2 km	MPC · JPL
72329	2001 BR_{59}	—	January 26, 2001	Socorro	LINEAR	EUN	2.6 km	MPC · JPL
72330	2001 BU_{59}	—	January 26, 2001	Socorro	LINEAR	EUN	2.8 km	MPC · JPL
72331	2001 BX_{59}	—	January 26, 2001	Socorro	LINEAR	·	11 km	MPC · JPL
72332	2001 BC_{60}	—	January 26, 2001	Socorro	LINEAR	NYS	2.8 km	MPC · JPL
72333	2001 BP_{60}	—	January 21, 2001	Socorro	LINEAR	·	3.1 km	MPC · JPL
72334	2001 BX_{60}	—	January 29, 2001	Socorro	LINEAR	·	2.6 km	MPC · JPL
72335	2001 BJ_{61}	—	January 24, 2001	Haleakala	NEAT	PHO	4.6 km	MPC · JPL
72336	2001 BY_{61}	—	January 26, 2001	Socorro	LINEAR	·	2.4 km	MPC · JPL
72337	2001 BO_{62}	—	January 29, 2001	Socorro	LINEAR	·	1.8 km	MPC · JPL
72338	2001 BC_{63}	—	January 29, 2001	Socorro	LINEAR	MAR	4.3 km	MPC · JPL
72339	2001 BW_{63}	—	January 29, 2001	Socorro	LINEAR	·	3.2 km	MPC · JPL
72340	2001 BO_{64}	—	January 29, 2001	Socorro	LINEAR	·	3.4 km	MPC · JPL
72341	2001 BJ_{65}	—	January 26, 2001	Socorro	LINEAR	·	2.7 km	MPC · JPL
72342	2001 BS_{66}	—	January 26, 2001	Socorro	LINEAR	·	3.8 km	MPC · JPL
72343	2001 BT_{67}	—	January 31, 2001	Socorro	LINEAR	·	2.6 km	MPC · JPL
72344	2001 BX_{68}	—	January 31, 2001	Socorro	LINEAR	·	3.4 km	MPC · JPL
72345	2001 BC_{69}	—	January 31, 2001	Socorro	LINEAR	NYS	1.8 km	MPC · JPL
72346	2001 BG_{69}	—	January 31, 2001	Socorro	LINEAR	MAR	3.0 km	MPC · JPL
72347	2001 BN_{69}	—	January 31, 2001	Socorro	LINEAR	·	2.6 km	MPC · JPL
72348	2001 BU_{69}	—	January 31, 2001	Socorro	LINEAR	·	7.0 km	MPC · JPL
72349	2001 BZ_{70}	—	January 29, 2001	Socorro	LINEAR	NYS	2.5 km	MPC · JPL
72350	2001 BG_{71}	—	January 29, 2001	Socorro	LINEAR	·	2.9 km	MPC · JPL
72351	2001 BJ_{71}	—	January 29, 2001	Socorro	LINEAR	·	3.0 km	MPC · JPL
72352	2001 BK_{72}	—	January 31, 2001	Socorro	LINEAR	BRA	5.0 km	MPC · JPL
72353	2001 BW_{72}	—	January 27, 2001	Haleakala	NEAT	·	2.4 km	MPC · JPL
72354	2001 BR_{74}	—	January 31, 2001	Kitt Peak	Spacewatch	·	2.4 km	MPC · JPL
72355	2001 BW_{74}	—	January 31, 2001	Socorro	LINEAR	EUN	4.1 km	MPC · JPL
72356	2001 BY_{74}	—	January 31, 2001	Socorro	LINEAR	·	2.7 km	MPC · JPL
72357	2001 BA_{75}	—	January 31, 2001	Socorro	LINEAR	VER	6.7 km	MPC · JPL
72358	2001 BH_{76}	—	January 26, 2001	Socorro	LINEAR	·	3.6 km	MPC · JPL
72359	2001 BX_{76}	—	January 26, 2001	Socorro	LINEAR	·	6.5 km	MPC · JPL
72360	2001 BM_{77}	—	January 26, 2001	Socorro	LINEAR	·	9.4 km	MPC · JPL
72361	2001 BX_{77}	—	January 25, 2001	Kitt Peak	Spacewatch	EOS	6.5 km	MPC · JPL
72362	2001 BT_{78}	—	January 22, 2001	Haleakala	NEAT	HNS	3.4 km	MPC · JPL
72363	2001 BQ_{79}	—	January 21, 2001	Socorro	LINEAR	NYS	2.9 km	MPC · JPL
72364	2001 BU_{79}	—	January 21, 2001	Socorro	LINEAR	·	2.2 km	MPC · JPL
72365	2001 BY_{79}	—	January 21, 2001	Socorro	LINEAR	·	2.7 km	MPC · JPL
72366	2001 CO	—	February 1, 2001	Socorro	LINEAR	·	2.6 km	MPC · JPL
72367	2001 CL_{1}	—	February 1, 2001	Socorro	LINEAR	·	4.2 km	MPC · JPL
72368	2001 CT_{2}	—	February 1, 2001	Socorro	LINEAR	PAD	5.5 km	MPC · JPL
72369	2001 CC_{3}	—	February 1, 2001	Socorro	LINEAR	·	6.9 km	MPC · JPL
72370	2001 CD_{3}	—	February 1, 2001	Socorro	LINEAR	·	6.4 km	MPC · JPL
72371	2001 CP_{3}	—	February 1, 2001	Socorro	LINEAR	·	5.0 km	MPC · JPL
72372	2001 CY_{4}	—	February 1, 2001	Socorro	LINEAR	·	2.5 km	MPC · JPL
72373	2001 CE_{5}	—	February 1, 2001	Socorro	LINEAR	·	3.6 km	MPC · JPL
72374	2001 CS_{5}	—	February 1, 2001	Socorro	LINEAR	·	4.9 km	MPC · JPL
72375	2001 CU_{6}	—	February 1, 2001	Socorro	LINEAR	·	2.0 km	MPC · JPL
72376	2001 CY_{6}	—	February 1, 2001	Socorro	LINEAR	EOS	4.2 km	MPC · JPL
72377	2001 CH_{8}	—	February 1, 2001	Socorro	LINEAR	NYS	2.8 km	MPC · JPL
72378	2001 CZ_{8}	—	February 1, 2001	Socorro	LINEAR	·	6.0 km	MPC · JPL
72379	2001 CR_{9}	—	February 1, 2001	Socorro	LINEAR	·	8.3 km	MPC · JPL
72380	2001 CF_{10}	—	February 1, 2001	Socorro	LINEAR	·	3.9 km	MPC · JPL
72381	2001 CM_{10}	—	February 1, 2001	Socorro	LINEAR	·	6.8 km	MPC · JPL
72382	2001 CR_{10}	—	February 1, 2001	Socorro	LINEAR	·	1.7 km	MPC · JPL
72383	2001 CF_{11}	—	February 1, 2001	Socorro	LINEAR	·	2.4 km	MPC · JPL
72384	2001 CF_{12}	—	February 1, 2001	Socorro	LINEAR	ERI	3.8 km	MPC · JPL
72385	2001 CK_{12}	—	February 1, 2001	Socorro	LINEAR	·	2.6 km	MPC · JPL
72386	2001 CW_{12}	—	February 1, 2001	Socorro	LINEAR	·	3.5 km	MPC · JPL
72387	2001 CF_{13}	—	February 1, 2001	Socorro	LINEAR	·	2.0 km	MPC · JPL
72388	2001 CC_{16}	—	February 1, 2001	Socorro	LINEAR	·	4.3 km	MPC · JPL
72389	2001 CE_{16}	—	February 1, 2001	Socorro	LINEAR	MRX	2.5 km	MPC · JPL
72390	2001 CL_{16}	—	February 1, 2001	Socorro	LINEAR	·	1.5 km	MPC · JPL
72391	2001 CB_{17}	—	February 1, 2001	Socorro	LINEAR	·	2.9 km	MPC · JPL
72392	2001 CH_{17}	—	February 1, 2001	Socorro	LINEAR	·	2.0 km	MPC · JPL
72393	2001 CH_{18}	—	February 2, 2001	Socorro	LINEAR	·	4.0 km	MPC · JPL
72394	2001 CJ_{19}	—	February 2, 2001	Socorro	LINEAR	·	4.2 km	MPC · JPL
72395	2001 CG_{20}	—	February 3, 2001	Socorro	LINEAR	GEF	3.6 km	MPC · JPL
72396	2001 CU_{20}	—	February 4, 2001	Socorro	LINEAR	PHO	5.8 km	MPC · JPL
72397	2001 CV_{21}	—	February 1, 2001	Anderson Mesa	LONEOS	·	2.7 km	MPC · JPL
72398	2001 CJ_{22}	—	February 1, 2001	Anderson Mesa	LONEOS	·	3.1 km	MPC · JPL
72399	2001 CN_{22}	—	February 1, 2001	Anderson Mesa	LONEOS	·	1.7 km	MPC · JPL
72400	2001 CX_{22}	—	February 1, 2001	Anderson Mesa	LONEOS	·	2.2 km	MPC · JPL

== 72401–72500 ==
back to top

Designation			Discovery			Properties		Ref
Permanent	Provisional	Named after	Date	Site	Discoverer(s)	Category	Diam.	Ref
72401	2001 CS_{23}	—	February 1, 2001	Anderson Mesa	LONEOS	·	1.3 km	MPC · JPL
72402	2001 CV_{24}	—	February 1, 2001	Socorro	LINEAR	AST	4.6 km	MPC · JPL
72403	2001 CZ_{25}	—	February 1, 2001	Socorro	LINEAR	·	2.2 km	MPC · JPL
72404	2001 CG_{26}	—	February 1, 2001	Socorro	LINEAR	·	2.6 km	MPC · JPL
72405	2001 CD_{27}	—	February 2, 2001	Kitt Peak	Spacewatch	EUN	3.3 km	MPC · JPL
72406	2001 CH_{27}	—	February 2, 2001	Anderson Mesa	LONEOS	·	2.8 km	MPC · JPL
72407	2001 CK_{27}	—	February 2, 2001	Anderson Mesa	LONEOS	·	4.5 km	MPC · JPL
72408	2001 CQ_{27}	—	February 2, 2001	Anderson Mesa	LONEOS	EOS	6.0 km	MPC · JPL
72409	2001 CV_{27}	—	February 2, 2001	Anderson Mesa	LONEOS	·	3.4 km	MPC · JPL
72410	2001 CD_{28}	—	February 2, 2001	Anderson Mesa	LONEOS	·	4.2 km	MPC · JPL
72411	2001 CP_{28}	—	February 2, 2001	Anderson Mesa	LONEOS	V	1.5 km	MPC · JPL
72412	2001 CA_{29}	—	February 2, 2001	Anderson Mesa	LONEOS	·	5.3 km	MPC · JPL
72413	2001 CF_{29}	—	February 2, 2001	Anderson Mesa	LONEOS	·	2.0 km	MPC · JPL
72414	2001 CT_{30}	—	February 2, 2001	Haleakala	NEAT	·	3.7 km	MPC · JPL
72415	2001 CV_{30}	—	February 2, 2001	Haleakala	NEAT	·	6.1 km	MPC · JPL
72416	2001 CG_{31}	—	February 3, 2001	Socorro	LINEAR	·	2.9 km	MPC · JPL
72417	2001 CF_{32}	—	February 11, 2001	Višnjan Observatory	K. Korlević	·	4.3 km	MPC · JPL
72418	2001 CO_{33}	—	February 13, 2001	Socorro	LINEAR	·	5.0 km	MPC · JPL
72419	2001 CJ_{34}	—	February 13, 2001	Socorro	LINEAR	·	3.2 km	MPC · JPL
72420	2001 CY_{35}	—	February 14, 2001	Črni Vrh	Skvarč, J.	·	4.5 km	MPC · JPL
72421	2001 CF_{36}	—	February 15, 2001	Oizumi	T. Kobayashi	·	2.6 km	MPC · JPL
72422	2001 CF_{38}	—	February 15, 2001	Socorro	LINEAR	·	9.6 km	MPC · JPL
72423	2001 CS_{38}	—	February 13, 2001	Socorro	LINEAR	V	2.0 km	MPC · JPL
72424	2001 CC_{39}	—	February 13, 2001	Socorro	LINEAR	·	3.4 km	MPC · JPL
72425	2001 CS_{39}	—	February 13, 2001	Socorro	LINEAR	ADE	4.9 km	MPC · JPL
72426	2001 CA_{40}	—	February 13, 2001	Socorro	LINEAR	·	2.6 km	MPC · JPL
72427	2001 CO_{40}	—	February 15, 2001	Socorro	LINEAR	EUN	3.5 km	MPC · JPL
72428	2001 CE_{41}	—	February 15, 2001	Socorro	LINEAR	·	3.8 km	MPC · JPL
72429	2001 CN_{41}	—	February 15, 2001	Črni Vrh	Mikuž, H.	·	4.7 km	MPC · JPL
72430	2001 CY_{41}	—	February 13, 2001	Socorro	LINEAR	·	9.2 km	MPC · JPL
72431	2001 CD_{42}	—	February 15, 2001	Socorro	LINEAR	·	5.9 km	MPC · JPL
72432 Kimrobinson	2001 CO_{42}	Kimrobinson	February 14, 2001	Carbuncle Hill	Pray, D. P.	·	2.2 km	MPC · JPL
72433	2001 CT_{42}	—	February 13, 2001	Socorro	LINEAR	·	2.7 km	MPC · JPL
72434	2001 CV_{42}	—	February 13, 2001	Socorro	LINEAR	·	4.5 km	MPC · JPL
72435	2001 CH_{43}	—	February 15, 2001	Socorro	LINEAR	·	4.0 km	MPC · JPL
72436	2001 CH_{44}	—	February 15, 2001	Socorro	LINEAR	·	3.6 km	MPC · JPL
72437	2001 CV_{44}	—	February 15, 2001	Socorro	LINEAR	·	3.0 km	MPC · JPL
72438	2001 CB_{45}	—	February 15, 2001	Socorro	LINEAR	·	2.5 km	MPC · JPL
72439	2001 CE_{45}	—	February 15, 2001	Socorro	LINEAR	MAR	4.0 km	MPC · JPL
72440	2001 CH_{45}	—	February 15, 2001	Socorro	LINEAR	URS	10 km	MPC · JPL
72441	2001 CD_{47}	—	February 13, 2001	Kitt Peak	Spacewatch	·	3.1 km	MPC · JPL
72442	2001 CN_{47}	—	February 12, 2001	Anderson Mesa	LONEOS	·	1.6 km	MPC · JPL
72443	2001 CU_{47}	—	February 12, 2001	Anderson Mesa	LONEOS	·	2.7 km	MPC · JPL
72444	2001 CZ_{48}	—	February 15, 2001	Socorro	LINEAR	EUN	3.6 km	MPC · JPL
72445	2001 DD	—	February 16, 2001	Črni Vrh	Mikuž, H.	PAD	4.7 km	MPC · JPL
72446	2001 DM	—	February 16, 2001	Desert Beaver	W. K. Y. Yeung	·	7.5 km	MPC · JPL
72447 Polińska	2001 DP	Polińska	February 16, 2001	Ondřejov	P. Pravec, L. Kotková	·	4.4 km	MPC · JPL
72448	2001 DD_{2}	—	February 16, 2001	Kitt Peak	Spacewatch	·	3.6 km	MPC · JPL
72449	2001 DS_{3}	—	February 16, 2001	Socorro	LINEAR	·	2.5 km	MPC · JPL
72450	2001 DV_{5}	—	February 16, 2001	Socorro	LINEAR	·	2.6 km	MPC · JPL
72451	2001 DW_{5}	—	February 16, 2001	Socorro	LINEAR	EOS	5.1 km	MPC · JPL
72452	2001 DL_{6}	—	February 16, 2001	Socorro	LINEAR	·	6.3 km	MPC · JPL
72453	2001 DO_{6}	—	February 16, 2001	Višnjan Observatory	K. Korlević	·	11 km	MPC · JPL
72454	2001 DR_{9}	—	February 16, 2001	Socorro	LINEAR	TIR	5.3 km	MPC · JPL
72455	2001 DX_{10}	—	February 17, 2001	Socorro	LINEAR	·	2.3 km	MPC · JPL
72456	2001 DZ_{12}	—	February 19, 2001	Kitt Peak	Spacewatch	NYS	2.4 km	MPC · JPL
72457	2001 DB_{14}	—	February 17, 2001	Socorro	LINEAR	PHO	2.1 km	MPC · JPL
72458	2001 DA_{16}	—	February 16, 2001	Socorro	LINEAR	·	5.2 km	MPC · JPL
72459	2001 DP_{18}	—	February 16, 2001	Socorro	LINEAR	·	3.9 km	MPC · JPL
72460	2001 DU_{18}	—	February 16, 2001	Socorro	LINEAR	GEF	3.6 km	MPC · JPL
72461	2001 DV_{18}	—	February 16, 2001	Socorro	LINEAR	·	3.1 km	MPC · JPL
72462	2001 DL_{21}	—	February 16, 2001	Socorro	LINEAR	·	10 km	MPC · JPL
72463	2001 DP_{21}	—	February 16, 2001	Socorro	LINEAR	EOS	5.9 km	MPC · JPL
72464	2001 DU_{21}	—	February 16, 2001	Socorro	LINEAR	·	3.4 km	MPC · JPL
72465	2001 DN_{23}	—	February 17, 2001	Socorro	LINEAR	·	4.9 km	MPC · JPL
72466	2001 DS_{23}	—	February 17, 2001	Socorro	LINEAR	·	3.4 km	MPC · JPL
72467	2001 DK_{24}	—	February 17, 2001	Socorro	LINEAR	·	2.8 km	MPC · JPL
72468	2001 DX_{24}	—	February 17, 2001	Socorro	LINEAR	·	3.8 km	MPC · JPL
72469	2001 DW_{27}	—	February 17, 2001	Socorro	LINEAR	·	2.7 km	MPC · JPL
72470	2001 DT_{28}	—	February 17, 2001	Socorro	LINEAR	·	6.4 km	MPC · JPL
72471	2001 DV_{30}	—	February 17, 2001	Socorro	LINEAR	EOS	4.7 km	MPC · JPL
72472	2001 DX_{32}	—	February 17, 2001	Socorro	LINEAR	THM	7.9 km	MPC · JPL
72473	2001 DD_{34}	—	February 17, 2001	Socorro	LINEAR	MAR	3.6 km	MPC · JPL
72474	2001 DD_{35}	—	February 19, 2001	Socorro	LINEAR	·	2.3 km	MPC · JPL
72475	2001 DJ_{35}	—	February 19, 2001	Socorro	LINEAR	·	4.2 km	MPC · JPL
72476	2001 DZ_{36}	—	February 19, 2001	Socorro	LINEAR	·	8.2 km	MPC · JPL
72477	2001 DQ_{37}	—	February 19, 2001	Socorro	LINEAR	EUN	2.8 km	MPC · JPL
72478	2001 DK_{38}	—	February 19, 2001	Socorro	LINEAR	EUN	3.5 km	MPC · JPL
72479	2001 DO_{38}	—	February 19, 2001	Socorro	LINEAR	MAR	2.4 km	MPC · JPL
72480	2001 DY_{38}	—	February 19, 2001	Socorro	LINEAR	V	1.7 km	MPC · JPL
72481	2001 DN_{39}	—	February 19, 2001	Socorro	LINEAR	·	2.5 km	MPC · JPL
72482	2001 DT_{39}	—	February 19, 2001	Socorro	LINEAR	·	2.1 km	MPC · JPL
72483	2001 DY_{39}	—	February 19, 2001	Socorro	LINEAR	·	2.7 km	MPC · JPL
72484	2001 DQ_{40}	—	February 19, 2001	Socorro	LINEAR	(5)	2.0 km	MPC · JPL
72485	2001 DS_{41}	—	February 19, 2001	Socorro	LINEAR	THM	6.1 km	MPC · JPL
72486	2001 DT_{41}	—	February 19, 2001	Socorro	LINEAR	·	4.0 km	MPC · JPL
72487	2001 DA_{43}	—	February 19, 2001	Socorro	LINEAR	·	3.6 km	MPC · JPL
72488	2001 DR_{43}	—	February 19, 2001	Socorro	LINEAR	MAS	1.9 km	MPC · JPL
72489	2001 DM_{45}	—	February 19, 2001	Socorro	LINEAR	·	3.0 km	MPC · JPL
72490	2001 DW_{46}	—	February 19, 2001	Socorro	LINEAR	·	3.3 km	MPC · JPL
72491	2001 DR_{49}	—	February 16, 2001	Socorro	LINEAR	·	7.6 km	MPC · JPL
72492	2001 DG_{54}	—	February 21, 2001	Desert Beaver	W. K. Y. Yeung	·	2.9 km	MPC · JPL
72493	2001 DP_{59}	—	February 17, 2001	Socorro	LINEAR	·	7.4 km	MPC · JPL
72494	2001 DS_{59}	—	February 17, 2001	Socorro	LINEAR	·	9.8 km	MPC · JPL
72495	2001 DX_{59}	—	February 19, 2001	Socorro	LINEAR	·	5.2 km	MPC · JPL
72496	2001 DO_{61}	—	February 19, 2001	Socorro	LINEAR	·	2.2 km	MPC · JPL
72497	2001 DD_{62}	—	February 19, 2001	Socorro	LINEAR	·	3.1 km	MPC · JPL
72498	2001 DN_{63}	—	February 19, 2001	Socorro	LINEAR	·	5.7 km	MPC · JPL
72499	2001 DR_{66}	—	February 19, 2001	Socorro	LINEAR	·	2.7 km	MPC · JPL
72500	2001 DT_{66}	—	February 19, 2001	Socorro	LINEAR	·	2.7 km	MPC · JPL

== 72501–72600 ==
back to top

Designation			Discovery			Properties		Ref
Permanent	Provisional	Named after	Date	Site	Discoverer(s)	Category	Diam.	Ref
72501	2001 DA_{67}	—	February 19, 2001	Socorro	LINEAR	·	7.0 km	MPC · JPL
72502	2001 DK_{67}	—	February 19, 2001	Socorro	LINEAR	·	3.5 km	MPC · JPL
72503	2001 DT_{68}	—	February 19, 2001	Socorro	LINEAR	NYS	2.9 km	MPC · JPL
72504	2001 DA_{69}	—	February 19, 2001	Socorro	LINEAR	EOS	4.9 km	MPC · JPL
72505	2001 DP_{69}	—	February 19, 2001	Socorro	LINEAR	NYS	2.3 km	MPC · JPL
72506	2001 DV_{69}	—	February 19, 2001	Socorro	LINEAR	NYS	3.1 km	MPC · JPL
72507	2001 DX_{69}	—	February 19, 2001	Socorro	LINEAR	·	5.8 km	MPC · JPL
72508	2001 DY_{70}	—	February 19, 2001	Socorro	LINEAR	NYS	2.6 km	MPC · JPL
72509	2001 DJ_{73}	—	February 19, 2001	Socorro	LINEAR	·	4.3 km	MPC · JPL
72510	2001 DS_{73}	—	February 19, 2001	Socorro	LINEAR	AGN	3.1 km	MPC · JPL
72511	2001 DW_{73}	—	February 19, 2001	Socorro	LINEAR	·	6.4 km	MPC · JPL
72512	2001 DR_{75}	—	February 20, 2001	Socorro	LINEAR	·	4.2 km	MPC · JPL
72513	2001 DW_{78}	—	February 18, 2001	Haleakala	NEAT	·	10 km	MPC · JPL
72514	2001 DC_{79}	—	February 16, 2001	Socorro	LINEAR	·	7.1 km	MPC · JPL
72515	2001 DD_{79}	—	February 16, 2001	Socorro	LINEAR	·	2.4 km	MPC · JPL
72516	2001 DC_{81}	—	February 26, 2001	Oizumi	T. Kobayashi	·	6.6 km	MPC · JPL
72517	2001 DK_{81}	—	February 26, 2001	Oizumi	T. Kobayashi	·	5.1 km	MPC · JPL
72518	2001 DP_{86}	—	February 25, 2001	Ondřejov	P. Kušnirák	·	3.7 km	MPC · JPL
72519	2001 DR_{87}	—	February 21, 2001	Anderson Mesa	LONEOS	·	2.1 km	MPC · JPL
72520	2001 DB_{88}	—	February 24, 2001	Prescott	P. G. Comba	EOS	4.2 km	MPC · JPL
72521	2001 DE_{89}	—	February 27, 2001	Kitt Peak	Spacewatch	PAD	4.0 km	MPC · JPL
72522	2001 DZ_{89}	—	February 22, 2001	Socorro	LINEAR	·	5.1 km	MPC · JPL
72523	2001 DC_{91}	—	February 20, 2001	Haleakala	NEAT	·	3.6 km	MPC · JPL
72524	2001 DB_{92}	—	February 20, 2001	Haleakala	NEAT	·	2.3 km	MPC · JPL
72525	2001 DL_{92}	—	February 19, 2001	Anderson Mesa	LONEOS	EOS	5.8 km	MPC · JPL
72526	2001 DV_{92}	—	February 19, 2001	Anderson Mesa	LONEOS	·	1.3 km	MPC · JPL
72527	2001 DK_{94}	—	February 19, 2001	Socorro	LINEAR	V	1.5 km	MPC · JPL
72528	2001 DH_{95}	—	February 18, 2001	Haleakala	NEAT	EUN	2.1 km	MPC · JPL
72529	2001 DT_{96}	—	February 17, 2001	Socorro	LINEAR	·	3.0 km	MPC · JPL
72530	2001 DJ_{98}	—	February 17, 2001	Socorro	LINEAR	·	4.8 km	MPC · JPL
72531	2001 DV_{98}	—	February 17, 2001	Socorro	LINEAR	·	6.6 km	MPC · JPL
72532	2001 DD_{99}	—	February 17, 2001	Socorro	LINEAR	·	2.7 km	MPC · JPL
72533	2001 DL_{99}	—	February 17, 2001	Socorro	LINEAR	·	2.9 km	MPC · JPL
72534	2001 DZ_{99}	—	February 17, 2001	Haleakala	NEAT	·	2.7 km	MPC · JPL
72535	2001 DX_{100}	—	February 16, 2001	Socorro	LINEAR	·	3.0 km	MPC · JPL
72536	2001 DM_{102}	—	February 16, 2001	Socorro	LINEAR	·	6.0 km	MPC · JPL
72537	2001 DP_{102}	—	February 16, 2001	Socorro	LINEAR	·	4.3 km	MPC · JPL
72538	2001 DR_{102}	—	February 16, 2001	Socorro	LINEAR	(2076)	1.8 km	MPC · JPL
72539	2001 DW_{103}	—	February 16, 2001	Anderson Mesa	LONEOS	·	3.8 km	MPC · JPL
72540	2001 DE_{104}	—	February 16, 2001	Anderson Mesa	LONEOS	THM	4.9 km	MPC · JPL
72541	2001 DO_{104}	—	February 16, 2001	Anderson Mesa	LONEOS	KOR	3.0 km	MPC · JPL
72542	2001 DE_{105}	—	February 16, 2001	Anderson Mesa	LONEOS	·	2.1 km	MPC · JPL
72543 Simonemarchi	2001 DN_{106}	Simonemarchi	February 26, 2001	Cima Ekar	ADAS	·	2.2 km	MPC · JPL
72544	2001 DG_{108}	—	February 19, 2001	Anderson Mesa	LONEOS	·	1.8 km	MPC · JPL
72545 Robbiiwessen	2001 EP	Robbiiwessen	March 3, 2001	Farpoint	G. Hug	EOS	5.7 km	MPC · JPL
72546	2001 ES	—	March 4, 2001	Oaxaca	Roe, J. M.	(2076)	2.1 km	MPC · JPL
72547	2001 ET	—	March 1, 2001	Socorro	LINEAR	·	2.9 km	MPC · JPL
72548	2001 EF_{1}	—	March 1, 2001	Socorro	LINEAR	·	2.5 km	MPC · JPL
72549	2001 EG_{1}	—	March 1, 2001	Socorro	LINEAR	·	3.0 km	MPC · JPL
72550	2001 EJ_{1}	—	March 1, 2001	Socorro	LINEAR	·	5.5 km	MPC · JPL
72551	2001 EQ_{1}	—	March 1, 2001	Socorro	LINEAR	HNS	3.6 km	MPC · JPL
72552	2001 EK_{2}	—	March 1, 2001	Socorro	LINEAR	·	5.1 km	MPC · JPL
72553	2001 EY_{2}	—	March 3, 2001	Kitt Peak	Spacewatch	·	3.1 km	MPC · JPL
72554	2001 ET_{3}	—	March 2, 2001	Anderson Mesa	LONEOS	·	7.6 km	MPC · JPL
72555	2001 EM_{4}	—	March 2, 2001	Anderson Mesa	LONEOS	·	2.2 km	MPC · JPL
72556	2001 EY_{4}	—	March 2, 2001	Anderson Mesa	LONEOS	KOR	3.6 km	MPC · JPL
72557	2001 EN_{5}	—	March 2, 2001	Anderson Mesa	LONEOS	·	5.6 km	MPC · JPL
72558	2001 ER_{5}	—	March 2, 2001	Anderson Mesa	LONEOS	HYG	6.3 km	MPC · JPL
72559	2001 EZ_{5}	—	March 2, 2001	Anderson Mesa	LONEOS	·	4.7 km	MPC · JPL
72560	2001 ES_{6}	—	March 2, 2001	Anderson Mesa	LONEOS	·	5.1 km	MPC · JPL
72561	2001 EX_{6}	—	March 2, 2001	Anderson Mesa	LONEOS	·	1.8 km	MPC · JPL
72562	2001 EM_{7}	—	March 2, 2001	Anderson Mesa	LONEOS	·	3.1 km	MPC · JPL
72563	2001 EN_{7}	—	March 2, 2001	Anderson Mesa	LONEOS	VER	7.4 km	MPC · JPL
72564	2001 EM_{8}	—	March 2, 2001	Anderson Mesa	LONEOS	·	3.4 km	MPC · JPL
72565	2001 ET_{8}	—	March 2, 2001	Anderson Mesa	LONEOS	·	3.3 km	MPC · JPL
72566	2001 EC_{9}	—	March 2, 2001	Anderson Mesa	LONEOS	·	2.2 km	MPC · JPL
72567	2001 EX_{10}	—	March 2, 2001	Haleakala	NEAT	·	7.0 km	MPC · JPL
72568	2001 EZ_{12}	—	March 5, 2001	Socorro	LINEAR	PHO	3.8 km	MPC · JPL
72569	2001 EC_{13}	—	March 14, 2001	Socorro	LINEAR	·	3.4 km	MPC · JPL
72570	2001 EB_{14}	—	March 15, 2001	Socorro	LINEAR	MAR	3.9 km	MPC · JPL
72571	2001 ED_{14}	—	March 15, 2001	Socorro	LINEAR	·	7.0 km	MPC · JPL
72572	2001 EL_{14}	—	March 15, 2001	Socorro	LINEAR	EOS	4.8 km	MPC · JPL
72573	2001 EE_{16}	—	March 15, 2001	Haleakala	NEAT	EOS	5.0 km	MPC · JPL
72574	2001 EJ_{16}	—	March 15, 2001	Haleakala	NEAT	·	8.7 km	MPC · JPL
72575	2001 ET_{16}	—	March 15, 2001	Haleakala	NEAT	NYS	2.2 km	MPC · JPL
72576	2001 EN_{18}	—	March 14, 2001	Anderson Mesa	LONEOS	·	3.1 km	MPC · JPL
72577	2001 ER_{18}	—	March 14, 2001	Anderson Mesa	LONEOS	·	4.2 km	MPC · JPL
72578	2001 EW_{18}	—	March 14, 2001	Anderson Mesa	LONEOS	·	3.0 km	MPC · JPL
72579	2001 EU_{19}	—	March 15, 2001	Kitt Peak	Spacewatch	·	8.0 km	MPC · JPL
72580	2001 ET_{21}	—	March 15, 2001	Anderson Mesa	LONEOS	V	1.7 km	MPC · JPL
72581	2001 EE_{22}	—	March 15, 2001	Anderson Mesa	LONEOS	·	2.2 km	MPC · JPL
72582	2001 EH_{27}	—	March 15, 2001	Anderson Mesa	LONEOS	THM	4.9 km	MPC · JPL
72583	2001 FV	—	March 17, 2001	Socorro	LINEAR	EOS	4.1 km	MPC · JPL
72584	2001 FO_{1}	—	March 19, 2001	Reedy Creek	J. Broughton	EOS	4.5 km	MPC · JPL
72585	2001 FT_{1}	—	March 16, 2001	Socorro	LINEAR	·	7.5 km	MPC · JPL
72586	2001 FY_{1}	—	March 16, 2001	Socorro	LINEAR	TEL	4.1 km	MPC · JPL
72587	2001 FP_{2}	—	March 18, 2001	Socorro	LINEAR	KOR	3.1 km	MPC · JPL
72588	2001 FR_{3}	—	March 18, 2001	Socorro	LINEAR	·	5.3 km	MPC · JPL
72589	2001 FY_{3}	—	March 18, 2001	Socorro	LINEAR	·	3.5 km	MPC · JPL
72590	2001 FF_{5}	—	March 18, 2001	Socorro	LINEAR	·	4.1 km	MPC · JPL
72591	2001 FO_{5}	—	March 18, 2001	Socorro	LINEAR	·	5.0 km	MPC · JPL
72592	2001 FQ_{5}	—	March 18, 2001	Socorro	LINEAR	GEF	3.8 km	MPC · JPL
72593	2001 FA_{6}	—	March 19, 2001	Socorro	LINEAR	·	2.9 km	MPC · JPL
72594	2001 FG_{6}	—	March 19, 2001	Socorro	LINEAR	CYB	10 km	MPC · JPL
72595	2001 FW_{7}	—	March 20, 2001	Socorro	LINEAR	·	3.5 km	MPC · JPL
72596 Zilkha	2001 FF_{9}	Zilkha	March 21, 2001	Needville	J. Dellinger, Rivich, K.	PHO	2.8 km	MPC · JPL
72597	2001 FW_{10}	—	March 19, 2001	Anderson Mesa	LONEOS	·	6.0 km	MPC · JPL
72598	2001 FM_{11}	—	March 19, 2001	Anderson Mesa	LONEOS	·	2.7 km	MPC · JPL
72599	2001 FE_{12}	—	March 19, 2001	Anderson Mesa	LONEOS	·	6.6 km	MPC · JPL
72600	2001 FS_{12}	—	March 19, 2001	Anderson Mesa	LONEOS	·	4.3 km	MPC · JPL

== 72601–72700 ==
back to top

Designation			Discovery			Properties		Ref
Permanent	Provisional	Named after	Date	Site	Discoverer(s)	Category	Diam.	Ref
72601	2001 FH_{13}	—	March 19, 2001	Anderson Mesa	LONEOS	AST	5.2 km	MPC · JPL
72602	2001 FC_{14}	—	March 19, 2001	Anderson Mesa	LONEOS	HYG	9.6 km	MPC · JPL
72603	2001 FG_{15}	—	March 19, 2001	Anderson Mesa	LONEOS	THM	7.2 km	MPC · JPL
72604	2001 FK_{15}	—	March 19, 2001	Anderson Mesa	LONEOS	·	7.7 km	MPC · JPL
72605	2001 FQ_{15}	—	March 19, 2001	Anderson Mesa	LONEOS	·	5.2 km	MPC · JPL
72606	2001 FD_{16}	—	March 19, 2001	Anderson Mesa	LONEOS	·	7.4 km	MPC · JPL
72607	2001 FH_{17}	—	March 19, 2001	Anderson Mesa	LONEOS	KOR	3.1 km	MPC · JPL
72608	2001 FL_{17}	—	March 19, 2001	Anderson Mesa	LONEOS	·	4.4 km	MPC · JPL
72609	2001 FN_{17}	—	March 19, 2001	Anderson Mesa	LONEOS	·	8.1 km	MPC · JPL
72610	2001 FJ_{18}	—	March 19, 2001	Anderson Mesa	LONEOS	·	4.2 km	MPC · JPL
72611	2001 FO_{18}	—	March 19, 2001	Anderson Mesa	LONEOS	·	5.0 km	MPC · JPL
72612	2001 FT_{19}	—	March 19, 2001	Anderson Mesa	LONEOS	·	5.2 km	MPC · JPL
72613	2001 FK_{20}	—	March 19, 2001	Anderson Mesa	LONEOS	·	6.8 km	MPC · JPL
72614	2001 FU_{20}	—	March 19, 2001	Anderson Mesa	LONEOS	EOS	5.1 km	MPC · JPL
72615	2001 FK_{21}	—	March 21, 2001	Anderson Mesa	LONEOS	EUN	5.5 km	MPC · JPL
72616	2001 FO_{21}	—	March 21, 2001	Anderson Mesa	LONEOS	HYG	8.0 km	MPC · JPL
72617	2001 FY_{21}	—	March 21, 2001	Anderson Mesa	LONEOS	EOS	6.4 km	MPC · JPL
72618	2001 FC_{23}	—	March 21, 2001	Anderson Mesa	LONEOS	GEF	3.0 km	MPC · JPL
72619	2001 FO_{23}	—	March 21, 2001	Anderson Mesa	LONEOS	·	3.1 km	MPC · JPL
72620	2001 FG_{25}	—	March 18, 2001	Socorro	LINEAR	EUN	2.4 km	MPC · JPL
72621	2001 FJ_{25}	—	March 18, 2001	Socorro	LINEAR	·	5.7 km	MPC · JPL
72622	2001 FE_{26}	—	March 18, 2001	Socorro	LINEAR	HYG	8.3 km	MPC · JPL
72623	2001 FK_{26}	—	March 18, 2001	Socorro	LINEAR	·	6.7 km	MPC · JPL
72624	2001 FH_{27}	—	March 18, 2001	Socorro	LINEAR	·	5.5 km	MPC · JPL
72625	2001 FP_{27}	—	March 18, 2001	Socorro	LINEAR	EOS	4.7 km	MPC · JPL
72626	2001 FR_{27}	—	March 18, 2001	Socorro	LINEAR	AGN	3.5 km	MPC · JPL
72627	2001 FZ_{27}	—	March 19, 2001	Socorro	LINEAR	VER	6.7 km	MPC · JPL
72628	2001 FR_{29}	—	March 18, 2001	Haleakala	NEAT	·	2.6 km	MPC · JPL
72629	2001 FZ_{29}	—	March 20, 2001	Haleakala	NEAT	·	8.3 km	MPC · JPL
72630	2001 FO_{30}	—	March 21, 2001	Haleakala	NEAT	·	2.5 km	MPC · JPL
72631	2001 FW_{30}	—	March 21, 2001	Haleakala	NEAT	EOS	5.2 km	MPC · JPL
72632 Coralina	2001 FF_{31}	Coralina	March 23, 2001	Gnosca	S. Sposetti	HYG	7.1 km	MPC · JPL
72633 Randygroth	2001 FJ_{31}	Randygroth	March 22, 2001	Junk Bond	D. Healy	·	4.2 km	MPC · JPL
72634	2001 FF_{33}	—	March 17, 2001	Socorro	LINEAR	·	3.3 km	MPC · JPL
72635	2001 FM_{34}	—	March 18, 2001	Socorro	LINEAR	·	5.2 km	MPC · JPL
72636	2001 FB_{35}	—	March 18, 2001	Socorro	LINEAR	·	2.0 km	MPC · JPL
72637	2001 FA_{36}	—	March 18, 2001	Socorro	LINEAR	·	4.7 km	MPC · JPL
72638	2001 FK_{36}	—	March 18, 2001	Socorro	LINEAR	·	2.5 km	MPC · JPL
72639	2001 FX_{36}	—	March 18, 2001	Socorro	LINEAR	·	3.9 km	MPC · JPL
72640	2001 FQ_{37}	—	March 18, 2001	Socorro	LINEAR	EOS	4.2 km	MPC · JPL
72641	2001 FT_{37}	—	March 18, 2001	Socorro	LINEAR	·	2.9 km	MPC · JPL
72642	2001 FC_{40}	—	March 18, 2001	Socorro	LINEAR	·	4.7 km	MPC · JPL
72643	2001 FJ_{40}	—	March 18, 2001	Socorro	LINEAR	·	9.0 km	MPC · JPL
72644	2001 FC_{41}	—	March 18, 2001	Socorro	LINEAR	·	3.4 km	MPC · JPL
72645	2001 FX_{41}	—	March 18, 2001	Socorro	LINEAR	·	12 km	MPC · JPL
72646	2001 FB_{42}	—	March 18, 2001	Socorro	LINEAR	·	3.3 km	MPC · JPL
72647	2001 FO_{42}	—	March 18, 2001	Socorro	LINEAR	·	6.7 km	MPC · JPL
72648	2001 FY_{42}	—	March 18, 2001	Socorro	LINEAR	·	5.0 km	MPC · JPL
72649	2001 FU_{43}	—	March 18, 2001	Socorro	LINEAR	·	3.9 km	MPC · JPL
72650	2001 FP_{44}	—	March 18, 2001	Socorro	LINEAR	PHO	3.7 km	MPC · JPL
72651	2001 FU_{44}	—	March 18, 2001	Socorro	LINEAR	·	8.4 km	MPC · JPL
72652	2001 FZ_{44}	—	March 18, 2001	Socorro	LINEAR	·	2.6 km	MPC · JPL
72653	2001 FA_{45}	—	March 18, 2001	Socorro	LINEAR	KOR	3.6 km	MPC · JPL
72654	2001 FD_{46}	—	March 18, 2001	Socorro	LINEAR	·	3.4 km	MPC · JPL
72655	2001 FK_{46}	—	March 18, 2001	Socorro	LINEAR	·	9.9 km	MPC · JPL
72656	2001 FL_{46}	—	March 18, 2001	Socorro	LINEAR	·	2.2 km	MPC · JPL
72657	2001 FM_{46}	—	March 18, 2001	Socorro	LINEAR	·	6.9 km	MPC · JPL
72658	2001 FS_{46}	—	March 18, 2001	Socorro	LINEAR	EOS	4.5 km	MPC · JPL
72659	2001 FV_{46}	—	March 18, 2001	Socorro	LINEAR	fast	9.0 km	MPC · JPL
72660	2001 FA_{47}	—	March 18, 2001	Socorro	LINEAR	EOS	6.9 km	MPC · JPL
72661	2001 FB_{48}	—	March 18, 2001	Socorro	LINEAR	·	7.2 km	MPC · JPL
72662	2001 FT_{48}	—	March 18, 2001	Socorro	LINEAR	·	11 km	MPC · JPL
72663	2001 FD_{49}	—	March 18, 2001	Socorro	LINEAR	EOS	6.3 km	MPC · JPL
72664	2001 FH_{49}	—	March 18, 2001	Socorro	LINEAR	·	7.9 km	MPC · JPL
72665	2001 FQ_{49}	—	March 18, 2001	Socorro	LINEAR	·	8.7 km	MPC · JPL
72666	2001 FU_{50}	—	March 18, 2001	Socorro	LINEAR	HYG	7.3 km	MPC · JPL
72667	2001 FY_{50}	—	March 18, 2001	Socorro	LINEAR	·	10 km	MPC · JPL
72668	2001 FG_{51}	—	March 18, 2001	Socorro	LINEAR	KOR	3.4 km	MPC · JPL
72669	2001 FF_{52}	—	March 18, 2001	Socorro	LINEAR	URS	7.7 km	MPC · JPL
72670	2001 FL_{52}	—	March 18, 2001	Socorro	LINEAR	·	5.3 km	MPC · JPL
72671	2001 FS_{52}	—	March 18, 2001	Socorro	LINEAR	·	2.3 km	MPC · JPL
72672	2001 FG_{53}	—	March 18, 2001	Socorro	LINEAR	·	5.7 km	MPC · JPL
72673	2001 FW_{53}	—	March 18, 2001	Socorro	LINEAR	·	7.2 km	MPC · JPL
72674	2001 FB_{54}	—	March 18, 2001	Socorro	LINEAR	MAR	4.5 km	MPC · JPL
72675	2001 FP_{54}	—	March 18, 2001	Socorro	LINEAR	·	3.8 km	MPC · JPL
72676	2001 FM_{56}	—	March 23, 2001	Socorro	LINEAR	EOS	4.6 km	MPC · JPL
72677	2001 FA_{60}	—	March 19, 2001	Socorro	LINEAR	MAS	1.4 km	MPC · JPL
72678	2001 FY_{60}	—	March 19, 2001	Socorro	LINEAR	EOS	5.0 km	MPC · JPL
72679	2001 FF_{61}	—	March 19, 2001	Socorro	LINEAR	·	3.0 km	MPC · JPL
72680	2001 FJ_{62}	—	March 19, 2001	Socorro	LINEAR	·	3.7 km	MPC · JPL
72681	2001 FO_{62}	—	March 19, 2001	Socorro	LINEAR	(5)	4.5 km	MPC · JPL
72682	2001 FV_{63}	—	March 19, 2001	Socorro	LINEAR	HYG	8.6 km	MPC · JPL
72683	2001 FS_{64}	—	March 19, 2001	Socorro	LINEAR	·	4.3 km	MPC · JPL
72684	2001 FX_{65}	—	March 19, 2001	Socorro	LINEAR	KOR	3.9 km	MPC · JPL
72685	2001 FG_{66}	—	March 19, 2001	Socorro	LINEAR	MAR	4.9 km	MPC · JPL
72686	2001 FQ_{67}	—	March 19, 2001	Socorro	LINEAR	·	5.7 km	MPC · JPL
72687	2001 FW_{68}	—	March 19, 2001	Socorro	LINEAR	·	6.1 km	MPC · JPL
72688	2001 FG_{69}	—	March 19, 2001	Socorro	LINEAR	·	9.4 km	MPC · JPL
72689	2001 FD_{70}	—	March 19, 2001	Socorro	LINEAR	ANF	3.6 km	MPC · JPL
72690	2001 FX_{71}	—	March 19, 2001	Socorro	LINEAR	EOS	5.8 km	MPC · JPL
72691	2001 FA_{72}	—	March 19, 2001	Socorro	LINEAR	·	5.9 km	MPC · JPL
72692	2001 FN_{72}	—	March 19, 2001	Socorro	LINEAR	·	5.1 km	MPC · JPL
72693	2001 FS_{72}	—	March 19, 2001	Socorro	LINEAR	GEF	3.3 km	MPC · JPL
72694	2001 FT_{72}	—	March 19, 2001	Socorro	LINEAR	·	8.5 km	MPC · JPL
72695	2001 FN_{73}	—	March 19, 2001	Socorro	LINEAR	EOS	4.7 km	MPC · JPL
72696	2001 FJ_{74}	—	March 19, 2001	Socorro	LINEAR	EOS	4.0 km	MPC · JPL
72697	2001 FX_{75}	—	March 19, 2001	Socorro	LINEAR	·	4.9 km	MPC · JPL
72698	2001 FZ_{75}	—	March 19, 2001	Socorro	LINEAR	EOS	6.7 km	MPC · JPL
72699	2001 FN_{76}	—	March 19, 2001	Socorro	LINEAR	·	3.3 km	MPC · JPL
72700	2001 FC_{77}	—	March 19, 2001	Socorro	LINEAR	·	4.8 km	MPC · JPL

== 72701–72800 ==
back to top

Designation			Discovery			Properties		Ref
Permanent	Provisional	Named after	Date	Site	Discoverer(s)	Category	Diam.	Ref
72701	2001 FZ_{77}	—	March 19, 2001	Socorro	LINEAR	·	7.5 km	MPC · JPL
72702	2001 FQ_{78}	—	March 19, 2001	Socorro	LINEAR	·	8.2 km	MPC · JPL
72703	2001 FM_{79}	—	March 21, 2001	Socorro	LINEAR	·	4.2 km	MPC · JPL
72704	2001 FX_{79}	—	March 21, 2001	Socorro	LINEAR	·	2.8 km	MPC · JPL
72705	2001 FO_{80}	—	March 21, 2001	Socorro	LINEAR	EOS	4.0 km	MPC · JPL
72706	2001 FU_{80}	—	March 21, 2001	Socorro	LINEAR	·	6.4 km	MPC · JPL
72707	2001 FX_{80}	—	March 23, 2001	Socorro	LINEAR	AGN	3.1 km	MPC · JPL
72708	2001 FS_{81}	—	March 23, 2001	Socorro	LINEAR	·	3.8 km	MPC · JPL
72709	2001 FP_{82}	—	March 23, 2001	Socorro	LINEAR	·	3.1 km	MPC · JPL
72710	2001 FV_{82}	—	March 23, 2001	Socorro	LINEAR	·	5.6 km	MPC · JPL
72711	2001 FW_{82}	—	March 23, 2001	Socorro	LINEAR	·	5.8 km	MPC · JPL
72712	2001 FT_{84}	—	March 26, 2001	Kitt Peak	Spacewatch	·	4.9 km	MPC · JPL
72713	2001 FQ_{86}	—	March 21, 2001	Anderson Mesa	LONEOS	·	3.5 km	MPC · JPL
72714	2001 FV_{86}	—	March 21, 2001	Anderson Mesa	LONEOS	EOS	5.1 km	MPC · JPL
72715	2001 FW_{86}	—	March 21, 2001	Anderson Mesa	LONEOS	EOS	5.2 km	MPC · JPL
72716	2001 FQ_{87}	—	March 21, 2001	Anderson Mesa	LONEOS	EOS	5.2 km	MPC · JPL
72717	2001 FA_{88}	—	March 21, 2001	Anderson Mesa	LONEOS	EOS	3.8 km	MPC · JPL
72718	2001 FJ_{90}	—	March 24, 2001	Socorro	LINEAR	ANF	4.0 km	MPC · JPL
72719	2001 FT_{90}	—	March 26, 2001	Socorro	LINEAR	KOR	3.5 km	MPC · JPL
72720	2001 FB_{91}	—	March 26, 2001	Socorro	LINEAR	·	3.9 km	MPC · JPL
72721	2001 FX_{91}	—	March 16, 2001	Socorro	LINEAR	·	4.6 km	MPC · JPL
72722	2001 FA_{92}	—	March 16, 2001	Socorro	LINEAR	·	5.2 km	MPC · JPL
72723	2001 FH_{93}	—	March 16, 2001	Socorro	LINEAR	·	2.6 km	MPC · JPL
72724	2001 FV_{93}	—	March 16, 2001	Socorro	LINEAR	·	9.4 km	MPC · JPL
72725	2001 FP_{94}	—	March 16, 2001	Socorro	LINEAR	HYG	6.7 km	MPC · JPL
72726	2001 FY_{94}	—	March 16, 2001	Socorro	LINEAR	(22805)	10 km	MPC · JPL
72727	2001 FP_{96}	—	March 16, 2001	Socorro	LINEAR	·	13 km	MPC · JPL
72728	2001 FQ_{96}	—	March 16, 2001	Socorro	LINEAR	NAE	7.8 km	MPC · JPL
72729	2001 FY_{96}	—	March 16, 2001	Socorro	LINEAR	EOS	5.3 km	MPC · JPL
72730	2001 FR_{99}	—	March 16, 2001	Socorro	LINEAR	EOS	3.5 km	MPC · JPL
72731	2001 FM_{100}	—	March 17, 2001	Socorro	LINEAR	·	3.7 km	MPC · JPL
72732	2001 FR_{101}	—	March 17, 2001	Socorro	LINEAR	V	1.9 km	MPC · JPL
72733	2001 FT_{101}	—	March 17, 2001	Socorro	LINEAR	·	5.5 km	MPC · JPL
72734	2001 FA_{102}	—	March 17, 2001	Socorro	LINEAR	EOS	6.1 km	MPC · JPL
72735	2001 FM_{102}	—	March 17, 2001	Kitt Peak	Spacewatch	·	6.6 km	MPC · JPL
72736	2001 FM_{103}	—	March 18, 2001	Socorro	LINEAR	·	4.2 km	MPC · JPL
72737	2001 FF_{104}	—	March 18, 2001	Socorro	LINEAR	·	2.5 km	MPC · JPL
72738	2001 FG_{104}	—	March 18, 2001	Socorro	LINEAR	·	4.4 km	MPC · JPL
72739	2001 FU_{105}	—	March 18, 2001	Anderson Mesa	LONEOS	·	7.0 km	MPC · JPL
72740	2001 FZ_{105}	—	March 18, 2001	Anderson Mesa	LONEOS	slow	10 km	MPC · JPL
72741	2001 FN_{106}	—	March 18, 2001	Anderson Mesa	LONEOS	EUN	4.2 km	MPC · JPL
72742	2001 FY_{108}	—	March 18, 2001	Socorro	LINEAR	·	10 km	MPC · JPL
72743	2001 FS_{115}	—	March 19, 2001	Socorro	LINEAR	·	3.4 km	MPC · JPL
72744	2001 FF_{116}	—	March 19, 2001	Anderson Mesa	LONEOS	·	2.4 km	MPC · JPL
72745	2001 FU_{117}	—	March 19, 2001	Haleakala	NEAT	EUN	3.0 km	MPC · JPL
72746	2001 FN_{120}	—	March 26, 2001	Socorro	LINEAR	·	3.7 km	MPC · JPL
72747	2001 FR_{121}	—	March 24, 2001	Haleakala	NEAT	EOS	10 km	MPC · JPL
72748	2001 FR_{126}	—	March 26, 2001	Socorro	LINEAR	·	4.9 km	MPC · JPL
72749	2001 FX_{126}	—	March 26, 2001	Socorro	LINEAR	·	9.5 km	MPC · JPL
72750	2001 FH_{127}	—	March 29, 2001	Socorro	LINEAR	VER	7.5 km	MPC · JPL
72751	2001 FW_{128}	—	March 26, 2001	Socorro	LINEAR	·	4.8 km	MPC · JPL
72752	2001 FR_{129}	—	March 28, 2001	Socorro	LINEAR	EOS	4.7 km	MPC · JPL
72753	2001 FK_{130}	—	March 29, 2001	Socorro	LINEAR	·	2.3 km	MPC · JPL
72754	2001 FC_{131}	—	March 20, 2001	Haleakala	NEAT	·	3.0 km	MPC · JPL
72755	2001 FO_{132}	—	March 20, 2001	Haleakala	NEAT	·	3.8 km	MPC · JPL
72756	2001 FA_{135}	—	March 21, 2001	Anderson Mesa	LONEOS	·	8.7 km	MPC · JPL
72757	2001 FP_{135}	—	March 21, 2001	Haleakala	NEAT	MAR	2.4 km	MPC · JPL
72758	2001 FB_{136}	—	March 21, 2001	Anderson Mesa	LONEOS	·	3.9 km	MPC · JPL
72759	2001 FF_{139}	—	March 21, 2001	Haleakala	NEAT	·	3.4 km	MPC · JPL
72760	2001 FZ_{139}	—	March 21, 2001	Haleakala	NEAT	·	7.8 km	MPC · JPL
72761	2001 FS_{142}	—	March 23, 2001	Haleakala	NEAT	·	6.3 km	MPC · JPL
72762	2001 FT_{142}	—	March 23, 2001	Socorro	LINEAR	EOS	4.3 km	MPC · JPL
72763	2001 FT_{143}	—	March 23, 2001	Anderson Mesa	LONEOS	HYG	11 km	MPC · JPL
72764	2001 FA_{144}	—	March 23, 2001	Anderson Mesa	LONEOS	·	6.7 km	MPC · JPL
72765	2001 FK_{144}	—	March 23, 2001	Anderson Mesa	LONEOS	·	3.7 km	MPC · JPL
72766	2001 FS_{144}	—	March 23, 2001	Anderson Mesa	LONEOS	EOS	4.7 km	MPC · JPL
72767	2001 FJ_{145}	—	March 24, 2001	Kitt Peak	Spacewatch	·	4.3 km	MPC · JPL
72768	2001 FD_{146}	—	March 24, 2001	Anderson Mesa	LONEOS	·	3.4 km	MPC · JPL
72769	2001 FQ_{147}	—	March 24, 2001	Anderson Mesa	LONEOS	·	4.5 km	MPC · JPL
72770	2001 FR_{147}	—	March 24, 2001	Anderson Mesa	LONEOS	(31811) ·	8.3 km	MPC · JPL
72771	2001 FT_{147}	—	March 24, 2001	Socorro	LINEAR	·	3.2 km	MPC · JPL
72772	2001 FU_{147}	—	March 24, 2001	Anderson Mesa	LONEOS	EOS	4.1 km	MPC · JPL
72773	2001 FL_{150}	—	March 24, 2001	Anderson Mesa	LONEOS	TIR	4.7 km	MPC · JPL
72774	2001 FV_{150}	—	March 24, 2001	Socorro	LINEAR	·	4.9 km	MPC · JPL
72775	2001 FJ_{152}	—	March 26, 2001	Socorro	LINEAR	MAR	3.3 km	MPC · JPL
72776	2001 FL_{152}	—	March 26, 2001	Socorro	LINEAR	·	7.0 km	MPC · JPL
72777	2001 FJ_{154}	—	March 26, 2001	Socorro	LINEAR	EUN	4.8 km	MPC · JPL
72778	2001 FV_{157}	—	March 27, 2001	Anderson Mesa	LONEOS	EOS	5.3 km	MPC · JPL
72779	2001 FA_{159}	—	March 29, 2001	Anderson Mesa	LONEOS	·	2.6 km	MPC · JPL
72780	2001 FW_{163}	—	March 18, 2001	Anderson Mesa	LONEOS	MAR	2.1 km	MPC · JPL
72781	2001 FG_{166}	—	March 19, 2001	Anderson Mesa	LONEOS	THM	3.6 km	MPC · JPL
72782	2001 FF_{167}	—	March 19, 2001	Socorro	LINEAR	·	3.5 km	MPC · JPL
72783	2001 FX_{168}	—	March 23, 2001	Anderson Mesa	LONEOS	EOS	8.2 km	MPC · JPL
72784	2001 FA_{170}	—	March 24, 2001	Anderson Mesa	LONEOS	·	3.8 km	MPC · JPL
72785	2001 FB_{170}	—	March 24, 2001	Anderson Mesa	LONEOS	EOS	4.7 km	MPC · JPL
72786	2001 FZ_{170}	—	March 24, 2001	Anderson Mesa	LONEOS	·	6.3 km	MPC · JPL
72787	2001 FB_{171}	—	March 24, 2001	Anderson Mesa	LONEOS	·	7.5 km	MPC · JPL
72788	2001 FV_{171}	—	March 24, 2001	Haleakala	NEAT	·	11 km	MPC · JPL
72789	2001 FG_{173}	—	March 21, 2001	Kitt Peak	Spacewatch	MRX	2.0 km	MPC · JPL
72790	2001 FR_{175}	—	March 16, 2001	Socorro	LINEAR	EOS	4.9 km	MPC · JPL
72791	2001 FW_{175}	—	March 16, 2001	Socorro	LINEAR	EOS	4.2 km	MPC · JPL
72792	2001 FD_{176}	—	March 16, 2001	Socorro	LINEAR	EOS	6.2 km	MPC · JPL
72793	2001 FF_{176}	—	March 16, 2001	Socorro	LINEAR	·	4.5 km	MPC · JPL
72794	2001 FA_{178}	—	March 19, 2001	Socorro	LINEAR	EOS	4.5 km	MPC · JPL
72795	2001 FJ_{179}	—	March 20, 2001	Anderson Mesa	LONEOS	·	7.2 km	MPC · JPL
72796	2001 FR_{179}	—	March 20, 2001	Anderson Mesa	LONEOS	·	2.8 km	MPC · JPL
72797	2001 FU_{180}	—	March 20, 2001	Anderson Mesa	LONEOS	·	4.1 km	MPC · JPL
72798	2001 FL_{186}	—	March 17, 2001	Kitt Peak	Spacewatch	·	5.6 km	MPC · JPL
72799	2001 FC_{188}	—	March 16, 2001	Socorro	LINEAR	PHO	4.3 km	MPC · JPL
72800	2001 FR_{188}	—	March 16, 2001	Socorro	LINEAR	EOS	4.9 km	MPC · JPL

== 72801–72900 ==
back to top

Designation			Discovery			Properties		Ref
Permanent	Provisional	Named after	Date	Site	Discoverer(s)	Category	Diam.	Ref
72801 Manzanera	2001 FE_{192}	Manzanera	March 25, 2001	Kitt Peak	M. W. Buie	·	7.3 km	MPC · JPL
72802 Wetton	2001 FT_{192}	Wetton	March 26, 2001	Kitt Peak	M. W. Buie	·	4.7 km	MPC · JPL
72803	2001 GD	—	April 1, 2001	Anderson Mesa	LONEOS	·	10 km	MPC · JPL
72804 Caldentey	2001 GQ	Caldentey	April 11, 2001	Majorca	Sánchez, S.	·	4.1 km	MPC · JPL
72805	2001 GN_{1}	—	April 14, 2001	Socorro	LINEAR	EUN	3.2 km	MPC · JPL
72806	2001 GA_{5}	—	April 15, 2001	Socorro	LINEAR	MAR	3.5 km	MPC · JPL
72807	2001 GG_{5}	—	April 15, 2001	Socorro	LINEAR	·	6.2 km	MPC · JPL
72808	2001 GS_{5}	—	April 13, 2001	Kitt Peak	Spacewatch	TEL	3.0 km	MPC · JPL
72809	2001 GW_{5}	—	April 13, 2001	Haleakala	NEAT	·	8.4 km	MPC · JPL
72810	2001 GJ_{7}	—	April 15, 2001	Socorro	LINEAR	EOS · slow	4.0 km	MPC · JPL
72811	2001 GN_{7}	—	April 15, 2001	Socorro	LINEAR	EOS	6.0 km	MPC · JPL
72812	2001 GB_{8}	—	April 15, 2001	Socorro	LINEAR	·	5.2 km	MPC · JPL
72813	2001 GP_{8}	—	April 15, 2001	Socorro	LINEAR	TIR	9.2 km	MPC · JPL
72814	2001 GX_{8}	—	April 15, 2001	Kitt Peak	Spacewatch	HOF	5.5 km	MPC · JPL
72815	2001 GY_{8}	—	April 15, 2001	Socorro	LINEAR	ADE ·	3.9 km	MPC · JPL
72816	2001 GJ_{9}	—	April 15, 2001	Kitt Peak	Spacewatch	·	10 km	MPC · JPL
72817	2001 GH_{11}	—	April 15, 2001	Socorro	LINEAR	·	3.1 km	MPC · JPL
72818	2001 HM	—	April 16, 2001	Reedy Creek	J. Broughton	EUN ·	5.4 km	MPC · JPL
72819 Brunet	2001 HX	Brunet	April 18, 2001	Saint-Véran	St. Veran	VER	7.5 km	MPC · JPL
72820	2001 HR_{1}	—	April 17, 2001	Socorro	LINEAR	·	4.4 km	MPC · JPL
72821	2001 HW_{2}	—	April 17, 2001	Socorro	LINEAR	AGN	4.7 km	MPC · JPL
72822	2001 HF_{3}	—	April 17, 2001	Socorro	LINEAR	EMA	9.7 km	MPC · JPL
72823	2001 HO_{3}	—	April 17, 2001	Socorro	LINEAR	slow?	4.2 km	MPC · JPL
72824	2001 HG_{4}	—	April 19, 2001	Reedy Creek	J. Broughton	·	6.0 km	MPC · JPL
72825	2001 HZ_{5}	—	April 18, 2001	Socorro	LINEAR	·	13 km	MPC · JPL
72826	2001 HD_{7}	—	April 18, 2001	Kitt Peak	Spacewatch	·	8.0 km	MPC · JPL
72827 Maxaub	2001 HT_{8}	Maxaub	April 23, 2001	Pla D'Arguines	R. Ferrando	EUN	3.7 km	MPC · JPL
72828	2001 HG_{10}	—	April 16, 2001	Socorro	LINEAR	·	9.2 km	MPC · JPL
72829	2001 HQ_{11}	—	April 18, 2001	Socorro	LINEAR	(18466)	3.2 km	MPC · JPL
72830	2001 HL_{13}	—	April 18, 2001	Socorro	LINEAR	HYG	8.5 km	MPC · JPL
72831	2001 HJ_{14}	—	April 23, 2001	Prescott	P. G. Comba	·	8.2 km	MPC · JPL
72832	2001 HW_{14}	—	April 23, 2001	Kitt Peak	Spacewatch	HOF	5.4 km	MPC · JPL
72833	2001 HL_{15}	—	April 21, 2001	Haleakala	NEAT	·	7.6 km	MPC · JPL
72834 Guywells	2001 HQ_{16}	Guywells	April 25, 2001	Emerald Lane	L. Ball	EUN	2.7 km	MPC · JPL
72835	2001 HE_{19}	—	April 24, 2001	Kitt Peak	Spacewatch	·	4.9 km	MPC · JPL
72836	2001 HF_{22}	—	April 23, 2001	Socorro	LINEAR	(1118)	9.6 km	MPC · JPL
72837	2001 HQ_{24}	—	April 24, 2001	Farpoint	Farpoint	·	3.6 km	MPC · JPL
72838	2001 HM_{29}	—	April 27, 2001	Socorro	LINEAR	·	8.7 km	MPC · JPL
72839	2001 HS_{31}	—	April 26, 2001	Desert Beaver	W. K. Y. Yeung	·	6.6 km	MPC · JPL
72840	2001 HW_{31}	—	April 28, 2001	Desert Beaver	W. K. Y. Yeung	·	10 km	MPC · JPL
72841 Manolaneri	2001 HC_{32}	Manolaneri	April 27, 2001	San Marcello	A. Boattini, M. Tombelli	KOR	3.1 km	MPC · JPL
72842	2001 HY_{32}	—	April 27, 2001	Socorro	LINEAR	HYG	8.4 km	MPC · JPL
72843	2001 HP_{33}	—	April 27, 2001	Socorro	LINEAR	·	4.3 km	MPC · JPL
72844	2001 HL_{34}	—	April 27, 2001	Socorro	LINEAR	VER	5.9 km	MPC · JPL
72845	2001 HP_{34}	—	April 27, 2001	Socorro	LINEAR	·	8.0 km	MPC · JPL
72846	2001 HY_{35}	—	April 29, 2001	Socorro	LINEAR	EOS	6.4 km	MPC · JPL
72847	2001 HD_{36}	—	April 29, 2001	Socorro	LINEAR	·	9.0 km	MPC · JPL
72848	2001 HV_{36}	—	April 29, 2001	Socorro	LINEAR	·	4.4 km	MPC · JPL
72849	2001 HK_{40}	—	April 27, 2001	Socorro	LINEAR	·	9.2 km	MPC · JPL
72850	2001 HV_{40}	—	April 27, 2001	Socorro	LINEAR	HNS	4.3 km	MPC · JPL
72851	2001 HW_{41}	—	April 16, 2001	Socorro	LINEAR	·	5.3 km	MPC · JPL
72852	2001 HD_{42}	—	April 16, 2001	Socorro	LINEAR	·	12 km	MPC · JPL
72853	2001 HE_{42}	—	April 16, 2001	Socorro	LINEAR	EOS	6.0 km	MPC · JPL
72854	2001 HK_{43}	—	April 16, 2001	Kitt Peak	Spacewatch	·	4.1 km	MPC · JPL
72855	2001 HX_{43}	—	April 16, 2001	Anderson Mesa	LONEOS	·	3.9 km	MPC · JPL
72856	2001 HB_{45}	—	April 16, 2001	Anderson Mesa	LONEOS	VER	7.3 km	MPC · JPL
72857	2001 HL_{46}	—	April 18, 2001	Kitt Peak	Spacewatch	·	6.8 km	MPC · JPL
72858	2001 HO_{46}	—	April 18, 2001	Socorro	LINEAR	THM	5.6 km	MPC · JPL
72859	2001 HS_{46}	—	April 18, 2001	Socorro	LINEAR	EOS	5.4 km	MPC · JPL
72860	2001 HL_{48}	—	April 21, 2001	Haleakala	NEAT	·	3.1 km	MPC · JPL
72861	2001 HN_{49}	—	April 21, 2001	Socorro	LINEAR	EOS	5.4 km	MPC · JPL
72862	2001 HE_{50}	—	April 21, 2001	Haleakala	NEAT	MAR	3.4 km	MPC · JPL
72863	2001 HJ_{51}	—	April 23, 2001	Socorro	LINEAR	NYS	2.4 km	MPC · JPL
72864	2001 HD_{54}	—	April 24, 2001	Anderson Mesa	LONEOS	·	9.0 km	MPC · JPL
72865	2001 HK_{58}	—	April 25, 2001	Anderson Mesa	LONEOS	·	8.8 km	MPC · JPL
72866	2001 HQ_{58}	—	April 25, 2001	Haleakala	NEAT	EOS	5.4 km	MPC · JPL
72867	2001 HU_{58}	—	April 25, 2001	Haleakala	NEAT	·	3.9 km	MPC · JPL
72868	2001 HE_{59}	—	April 21, 2001	Socorro	LINEAR	·	5.0 km	MPC · JPL
72869	2001 HE_{62}	—	April 26, 2001	Anderson Mesa	LONEOS	·	8.4 km	MPC · JPL
72870	2001 HT_{65}	—	April 30, 2001	Socorro	LINEAR	·	8.3 km	MPC · JPL
72871	2001 JM_{3}	—	May 15, 2001	Haleakala	NEAT	DOR · slow	4.3 km	MPC · JPL
72872	2001 JT_{3}	—	May 15, 2001	Haleakala	NEAT	·	5.6 km	MPC · JPL
72873	2001 JX_{4}	—	May 15, 2001	Kitt Peak	Spacewatch	·	3.2 km	MPC · JPL
72874	2001 JF_{6}	—	May 14, 2001	Kitt Peak	Spacewatch	·	6.5 km	MPC · JPL
72875	2001 JC_{8}	—	May 15, 2001	Anderson Mesa	LONEOS	·	7.1 km	MPC · JPL
72876 Vauriot	2001 KH_{2}	Vauriot	May 20, 2001	Pises	Pises	·	3.8 km	MPC · JPL
72877	2001 KL_{2}	—	May 21, 2001	Goodricke-Pigott	R. A. Tucker	·	6.3 km	MPC · JPL
72878	2001 KD_{4}	—	May 17, 2001	Socorro	LINEAR	·	6.2 km	MPC · JPL
72879	2001 KR_{5}	—	May 17, 2001	Socorro	LINEAR	URS	9.4 km	MPC · JPL
72880	2001 KP_{7}	—	May 18, 2001	Socorro	LINEAR	·	7.2 km	MPC · JPL
72881	2001 KU_{7}	—	May 18, 2001	Socorro	LINEAR	EOS	5.7 km	MPC · JPL
72882	2001 KM_{9}	—	May 18, 2001	Socorro	LINEAR	URS	15 km	MPC · JPL
72883	2001 KJ_{12}	—	May 18, 2001	Socorro	LINEAR	·	11 km	MPC · JPL
72884	2001 KK_{12}	—	May 18, 2001	Socorro	LINEAR	HYG	6.6 km	MPC · JPL
72885	2001 KJ_{14}	—	May 18, 2001	Socorro	LINEAR	·	4.8 km	MPC · JPL
72886	2001 KC_{18}	—	May 21, 2001	Ondřejov	P. Kušnirák, P. Pravec	EOS	4.2 km	MPC · JPL
72887	2001 KE_{19}	—	May 18, 2001	Socorro	LINEAR	fast	10 km	MPC · JPL
72888	2001 KW_{25}	—	May 17, 2001	Socorro	LINEAR	·	9.3 km	MPC · JPL
72889	2001 KG_{26}	—	May 17, 2001	Socorro	LINEAR	HYG	5.8 km	MPC · JPL
72890	2001 KF_{29}	—	May 21, 2001	Socorro	LINEAR	·	8.3 km	MPC · JPL
72891	2001 KL_{31}	—	May 22, 2001	Socorro	LINEAR	·	6.4 km	MPC · JPL
72892	2001 KH_{38}	—	May 22, 2001	Socorro	LINEAR	EUN	4.7 km	MPC · JPL
72893	2001 KG_{43}	—	May 22, 2001	Socorro	LINEAR	·	7.7 km	MPC · JPL
72894	2001 KE_{45}	—	May 22, 2001	Socorro	LINEAR	TIR	6.0 km	MPC · JPL
72895	2001 KA_{52}	—	May 16, 2001	Haleakala	NEAT	·	3.2 km	MPC · JPL
72896	2001 KA_{54}	—	May 21, 2001	Socorro	LINEAR	·	6.1 km	MPC · JPL
72897	2001 KM_{55}	—	May 22, 2001	Socorro	LINEAR	URS	11 km	MPC · JPL
72898	2001 KO_{56}	—	May 23, 2001	Socorro	LINEAR	·	10 km	MPC · JPL
72899	2001 KA_{61}	—	May 17, 2001	Kitt Peak	Spacewatch	(31811)	4.7 km	MPC · JPL
72900	2001 KB_{61}	—	May 17, 2001	Kitt Peak	Spacewatch	EOS	4.8 km	MPC · JPL

== 72901–73000 ==
back to top

Designation			Discovery			Properties		Ref
Permanent	Provisional	Named after	Date	Site	Discoverer(s)	Category	Diam.	Ref
72901	2001 KJ_{69}	—	May 22, 2001	Anderson Mesa	LONEOS	GAL	2.8 km	MPC · JPL
72902	2001 KE_{71}	—	May 24, 2001	Anderson Mesa	LONEOS	·	5.0 km	MPC · JPL
72903	2001 KO_{71}	—	May 24, 2001	Anderson Mesa	LONEOS	·	7.1 km	MPC · JPL
72904	2001 KM_{74}	—	May 26, 2001	Socorro	LINEAR	·	7.9 km	MPC · JPL
72905	2001 LX	—	June 13, 2001	Socorro	LINEAR	·	2.7 km	MPC · JPL
72906	2001 LQ_{1}	—	June 13, 2001	Desert Beaver	W. K. Y. Yeung	EOS	5.0 km	MPC · JPL
72907	2001 MY_{1}	—	June 16, 2001	Palomar	NEAT	EUN	3.7 km	MPC · JPL
72908	2001 MC_{11}	—	June 21, 2001	Palomar	NEAT	·	6.9 km	MPC · JPL
72909	2001 NH	—	July 10, 2001	Palomar	NEAT	V	1.6 km	MPC · JPL
72910	2001 ND_{16}	—	July 14, 2001	Palomar	NEAT	·	2.3 km	MPC · JPL
72911	2001 OC_{32}	—	July 23, 2001	Reedy Creek	J. Broughton	URS	16 km	MPC · JPL
72912 Fobarsti	2001 OA_{84}	Fobarsti	July 18, 2001	Mauna Kea	D. J. Tholen	EUN	3.1 km	MPC · JPL
72913	2001 OA_{95}	—	July 29, 2001	Palomar	NEAT	·	8.7 km	MPC · JPL
72914	2001 PS_{14}	—	August 14, 2001	Ondřejov	P. Kušnirák	NYS	1.9 km	MPC · JPL
72915	2001 PK_{24}	—	August 11, 2001	Haleakala	NEAT	slow	13 km	MPC · JPL
72916	2001 QR_{53}	—	August 16, 2001	Socorro	LINEAR	·	2.2 km	MPC · JPL
72917	2001 QX_{87}	—	August 21, 2001	Kitt Peak	Spacewatch	·	1.8 km	MPC · JPL
72918	2001 RB_{134}	—	September 12, 2001	Socorro	LINEAR	NYS	2.0 km	MPC · JPL
72919	2001 SJ_{45}	—	September 16, 2001	Socorro	LINEAR	AGN	2.5 km	MPC · JPL
72920	2001 SK_{79}	—	September 20, 2001	Socorro	LINEAR	·	5.3 km	MPC · JPL
72921	2001 UU_{36}	—	October 16, 2001	Socorro	LINEAR	·	2.5 km	MPC · JPL
72922	2001 UL_{213}	—	October 23, 2001	Socorro	LINEAR	EUN	1.5 km	MPC · JPL
72923	2001 VM_{32}	—	November 9, 2001	Socorro	LINEAR	NYS	3.1 km	MPC · JPL
72924	2001 WM_{66}	—	November 20, 2001	Socorro	LINEAR	·	2.6 km	MPC · JPL
72925	2001 XJ_{90}	—	December 10, 2001	Socorro	LINEAR	·	2.6 km	MPC · JPL
72926	2001 XB_{128}	—	December 14, 2001	Socorro	LINEAR	·	3.0 km	MPC · JPL
72927	2001 XX_{155}	—	December 14, 2001	Socorro	LINEAR	·	2.6 km	MPC · JPL
72928	2002 AD_{5}	—	January 8, 2002	Oaxaca	Roe, J. M.	·	2.7 km	MPC · JPL
72929	2002 AV_{8}	—	January 7, 2002	Kitt Peak	Spacewatch	·	1.5 km	MPC · JPL
72930	2002 AE_{10}	—	January 11, 2002	Desert Eagle	W. K. Y. Yeung	NYS	3.2 km	MPC · JPL
72931	2002 AJ_{14}	—	January 12, 2002	Desert Eagle	W. K. Y. Yeung	·	3.0 km	MPC · JPL
72932	2002 AB_{62}	—	January 11, 2002	Socorro	LINEAR	·	2.3 km	MPC · JPL
72933	2002 AS_{90}	—	January 12, 2002	Socorro	LINEAR	H	1.4 km	MPC · JPL
72934	2002 AZ_{134}	—	January 9, 2002	Socorro	LINEAR	·	2.8 km	MPC · JPL
72935	2002 AG_{154}	—	January 14, 2002	Socorro	LINEAR	NYS	2.9 km	MPC · JPL
72936	2002 AR_{167}	—	January 13, 2002	Socorro	LINEAR	NYS	2.6 km	MPC · JPL
72937	2002 AR_{174}	—	January 14, 2002	Socorro	LINEAR	·	1.7 km	MPC · JPL
72938	2002 BB_{21}	—	January 25, 2002	Socorro	LINEAR	H	1.5 km	MPC · JPL
72939	2002 BA_{24}	—	January 23, 2002	Socorro	LINEAR	·	6.3 km	MPC · JPL
72940	2002 BC_{30}	—	January 21, 2002	Palomar	NEAT	·	1.8 km	MPC · JPL
72941	2002 CD_{8}	—	February 4, 2002	Palomar	NEAT	ERI	4.1 km	MPC · JPL
72942	2002 CU_{9}	—	February 6, 2002	Socorro	LINEAR	H	1.1 km	MPC · JPL
72943	2002 CU_{10}	—	February 6, 2002	Socorro	LINEAR	H	1.4 km	MPC · JPL
72944	2002 CX_{15}	—	February 8, 2002	Desert Eagle	W. K. Y. Yeung	·	1.5 km	MPC · JPL
72945	2002 CJ_{16}	—	February 7, 2002	Kingsnake	J. V. McClusky	H	1.1 km	MPC · JPL
72946	2002 CY_{16}	—	February 6, 2002	Socorro	LINEAR	·	2.0 km	MPC · JPL
72947	2002 CZ_{19}	—	February 4, 2002	Palomar	NEAT	·	1.6 km	MPC · JPL
72948	2002 CC_{39}	—	February 7, 2002	Socorro	LINEAR	·	3.0 km	MPC · JPL
72949 Colesanti	2002 CC_{43}	Colesanti	February 12, 2002	Fountain Hills	C. W. Juels, P. R. Holvorcem	·	2.7 km	MPC · JPL
72950	2002 CF_{44}	—	February 10, 2002	Socorro	LINEAR	·	1.6 km	MPC · JPL
72951	2002 CC_{52}	—	February 12, 2002	Desert Eagle	W. K. Y. Yeung	·	1.5 km	MPC · JPL
72952	2002 CE_{57}	—	February 7, 2002	Socorro	LINEAR	·	2.2 km	MPC · JPL
72953	2002 CJ_{59}	—	February 12, 2002	Desert Eagle	W. K. Y. Yeung	·	1.4 km	MPC · JPL
72954	2002 CF_{84}	—	February 7, 2002	Socorro	LINEAR	NYS	1.7 km	MPC · JPL
72955	2002 CV_{95}	—	February 7, 2002	Socorro	LINEAR	·	3.0 km	MPC · JPL
72956	2002 CU_{100}	—	February 7, 2002	Socorro	LINEAR	·	1.4 km	MPC · JPL
72957	2002 CZ_{100}	—	February 7, 2002	Socorro	LINEAR	·	2.1 km	MPC · JPL
72958	2002 CP_{104}	—	February 7, 2002	Socorro	LINEAR	NYS	2.6 km	MPC · JPL
72959	2002 CK_{105}	—	February 7, 2002	Socorro	LINEAR	NYS	1.3 km	MPC · JPL
72960	2002 CZ_{110}	—	February 7, 2002	Socorro	LINEAR	·	1.4 km	MPC · JPL
72961	2002 CJ_{112}	—	February 7, 2002	Socorro	LINEAR	·	3.0 km	MPC · JPL
72962	2002 CN_{112}	—	February 7, 2002	Socorro	LINEAR	·	3.8 km	MPC · JPL
72963	2002 CC_{113}	—	February 8, 2002	Socorro	LINEAR	NYS	2.3 km	MPC · JPL
72964	2002 CP_{117}	—	February 9, 2002	Anderson Mesa	LONEOS	·	2.7 km	MPC · JPL
72965	2002 CR_{133}	—	February 7, 2002	Socorro	LINEAR	·	3.9 km	MPC · JPL
72966	2002 CG_{140}	—	February 8, 2002	Socorro	LINEAR	·	3.6 km	MPC · JPL
72967	2002 CH_{141}	—	February 8, 2002	Socorro	LINEAR	·	2.3 km	MPC · JPL
72968	2002 CK_{151}	—	February 10, 2002	Socorro	LINEAR	·	2.9 km	MPC · JPL
72969	2002 CD_{152}	—	February 10, 2002	Socorro	LINEAR	NYS	2.6 km	MPC · JPL
72970	2002 CZ_{174}	—	February 8, 2002	Socorro	LINEAR	slow	2.2 km	MPC · JPL
72971	2002 CR_{195}	—	February 10, 2002	Socorro	LINEAR	·	1.3 km	MPC · JPL
72972	2002 CL_{210}	—	February 10, 2002	Socorro	LINEAR	MAS	1.6 km	MPC · JPL
72973	2002 CU_{217}	—	February 10, 2002	Socorro	LINEAR	·	1.3 km	MPC · JPL
72974	2002 CE_{221}	—	February 10, 2002	Socorro	LINEAR	·	4.5 km	MPC · JPL
72975	2002 CB_{232}	—	February 7, 2002	Socorro	LINEAR	EUP	10 km	MPC · JPL
72976	2002 CQ_{235}	—	February 8, 2002	Socorro	LINEAR	·	1.7 km	MPC · JPL
72977	2002 CT_{236}	—	February 8, 2002	Socorro	LINEAR	·	4.4 km	MPC · JPL
72978	2002 CU_{236}	—	February 8, 2002	Socorro	LINEAR	·	3.4 km	MPC · JPL
72979	2002 CN_{239}	—	February 11, 2002	Socorro	LINEAR	·	1.5 km	MPC · JPL
72980	2002 CJ_{243}	—	February 11, 2002	Socorro	LINEAR	·	1.8 km	MPC · JPL
72981	2002 CV_{246}	—	February 15, 2002	Kitt Peak	Spacewatch	NYS	1.3 km	MPC · JPL
72982	2002 CC_{248}	—	February 15, 2002	Socorro	LINEAR	·	3.4 km	MPC · JPL
72983	2002 CG_{248}	—	February 15, 2002	Socorro	LINEAR	PHO	1.9 km	MPC · JPL
72984	2002 CB_{253}	—	February 5, 2002	Palomar	NEAT	·	3.6 km	MPC · JPL
72985	2002 DK_{2}	—	February 19, 2002	Desert Eagle	W. K. Y. Yeung	·	1.3 km	MPC · JPL
72986	2002 DQ_{8}	—	February 19, 2002	Socorro	LINEAR	PHO	2.3 km	MPC · JPL
72987	2002 DL_{18}	—	February 21, 2002	Socorro	LINEAR	H	990 m	MPC · JPL
72988	2002 EP	—	March 5, 2002	Desert Eagle	W. K. Y. Yeung	·	2.4 km	MPC · JPL
72989	2002 EW_{1}	—	March 6, 2002	Socorro	LINEAR	PHO	1.9 km	MPC · JPL
72990	2002 EK_{6}	—	March 12, 2002	Desert Eagle	W. K. Y. Yeung	·	1.5 km	MPC · JPL
72991	2002 EW_{7}	—	March 10, 2002	Haleakala	NEAT	·	4.7 km	MPC · JPL
72992	2002 EM_{10}	—	March 15, 2002	Kvistaberg	Uppsala-DLR Asteroid Survey	·	3.2 km	MPC · JPL
72993 Hannahlivsey	2002 ES_{10}	Hannahlivsey	March 15, 2002	Nogales	Tenagra II	NYS	2.3 km	MPC · JPL
72994	2002 EZ_{10}	—	March 12, 2002	Socorro	LINEAR	·	1.2 km	MPC · JPL
72995	2002 ER_{12}	—	March 14, 2002	Desert Eagle	W. K. Y. Yeung	·	2.4 km	MPC · JPL
72996	2002 EZ_{12}	—	March 14, 2002	Desert Eagle	W. K. Y. Yeung	·	2.4 km	MPC · JPL
72997	2002 EF_{15}	—	March 5, 2002	Palomar	NEAT	V	1.2 km	MPC · JPL
72998	2002 EC_{16}	—	March 6, 2002	Palomar	NEAT	·	4.0 km	MPC · JPL
72999	2002 EN_{20}	—	March 9, 2002	Socorro	LINEAR	V	1.4 km	MPC · JPL
73000	2002 ER_{20}	—	March 9, 2002	Socorro	LINEAR	·	3.0 km	MPC · JPL

back to top

== See also ==
- Meanings of minor-planet names: 72001–73000
