= List of minor planets: 71001–72000 =

The following is a partial list of minor planets, running from minor-planet number 71001 through 72000, inclusive. The primary data for this and other partial lists is based on JPL's "Small-Body Orbital Elements" and data available from the Minor Planet Center. Critical list information is also provided by the MPC, unless otherwise specified from Lowell Observatory. A detailed description of the table's columns and additional sources are given on the main page including a complete list of every page in this series, and a statistical break-up on the dynamical classification of minor planets.

Also see the summary list of all named bodies in numerical and alphabetical order, and the corresponding naming citations for the number range of this particular list. New namings may only be added to this list after official publication, as the preannouncement of names is condemned by the Working Group for Small Bodies Nomenclature of the International Astronomical Union.

Near-Earth obj.	MBA (inner)	MBA (outer)	Centaur
Mars-crosser	MBA (middle)	Jupiter trojan	Trans-Neptunian obj.
Unclassified

== 71001–71100 ==
Designation			Discovery			Properties		Ref
Permanent	Provisional	Named after	Date	Site	Discoverer(s)	Category	Diam.	Ref
71001 Natspasoc	1999 XL_{37}	Natspasoc	December 7, 1999	Fountain Hills	C. W. Juels	MAR	5.3 km	MPC · JPL
71002	1999 XO_{37}	—	December 7, 1999	Črni Vrh	Mikuž, H.	·	6.4 km	MPC · JPL
71003	1999 XD_{38}	—	December 3, 1999	Uenohara	N. Kawasato	KOR	3.5 km	MPC · JPL
71004	1999 XF_{38}	—	December 3, 1999	Nachi-Katsuura	Y. Shimizu, T. Urata	·	3.5 km	MPC · JPL
71005	1999 XN_{41}	—	December 7, 1999	Socorro	LINEAR	·	3.6 km	MPC · JPL
71006	1999 XQ_{42}	—	December 7, 1999	Socorro	LINEAR	·	2.2 km	MPC · JPL
71007	1999 XA_{43}	—	December 7, 1999	Socorro	LINEAR	·	2.3 km	MPC · JPL
71008	1999 XS_{43}	—	December 7, 1999	Socorro	LINEAR	·	2.8 km	MPC · JPL
71009	1999 XY_{44}	—	December 7, 1999	Socorro	LINEAR	·	3.1 km	MPC · JPL
71010	1999 XD_{45}	—	December 7, 1999	Socorro	LINEAR	V	2.5 km	MPC · JPL
71011	1999 XE_{45}	—	December 7, 1999	Socorro	LINEAR	PAD	3.3 km	MPC · JPL
71012	1999 XH_{49}	—	December 7, 1999	Socorro	LINEAR	·	3.2 km	MPC · JPL
71013	1999 XG_{50}	—	December 7, 1999	Socorro	LINEAR	·	3.1 km	MPC · JPL
71014	1999 XW_{52}	—	December 7, 1999	Socorro	LINEAR	·	4.5 km	MPC · JPL
71015	1999 XM_{55}	—	December 7, 1999	Socorro	LINEAR	·	4.1 km	MPC · JPL
71016	1999 XR_{55}	—	December 7, 1999	Socorro	LINEAR	ADE	6.1 km	MPC · JPL
71017	1999 XW_{55}	—	December 7, 1999	Socorro	LINEAR	·	3.4 km	MPC · JPL
71018	1999 XC_{57}	—	December 7, 1999	Socorro	LINEAR	·	7.0 km	MPC · JPL
71019	1999 XK_{57}	—	December 7, 1999	Socorro	LINEAR	·	3.5 km	MPC · JPL
71020	1999 XW_{58}	—	December 7, 1999	Socorro	LINEAR	·	2.7 km	MPC · JPL
71021	1999 XY_{58}	—	December 7, 1999	Socorro	LINEAR	·	2.6 km	MPC · JPL
71022	1999 XD_{59}	—	December 7, 1999	Socorro	LINEAR	MAR	2.9 km	MPC · JPL
71023	1999 XT_{60}	—	December 7, 1999	Socorro	LINEAR	·	3.2 km	MPC · JPL
71024	1999 XU_{60}	—	December 7, 1999	Socorro	LINEAR	·	3.7 km	MPC · JPL
71025	1999 XZ_{60}	—	December 7, 1999	Socorro	LINEAR	ADE	6.0 km	MPC · JPL
71026	1999 XD_{62}	—	December 7, 1999	Socorro	LINEAR	·	2.6 km	MPC · JPL
71027	1999 XS_{62}	—	December 7, 1999	Socorro	LINEAR	·	4.4 km	MPC · JPL
71028	1999 XJ_{66}	—	December 7, 1999	Socorro	LINEAR	·	3.4 km	MPC · JPL
71029	1999 XS_{66}	—	December 7, 1999	Socorro	LINEAR	·	3.9 km	MPC · JPL
71030	1999 XM_{67}	—	December 7, 1999	Socorro	LINEAR	EUN	5.2 km	MPC · JPL
71031	1999 XE_{68}	—	December 7, 1999	Socorro	LINEAR	KOR	3.3 km	MPC · JPL
71032	1999 XE_{70}	—	December 7, 1999	Socorro	LINEAR	·	3.9 km	MPC · JPL
71033	1999 XU_{70}	—	December 7, 1999	Socorro	LINEAR	KOR	3.4 km	MPC · JPL
71034	1999 XK_{71}	—	December 7, 1999	Socorro	LINEAR	·	3.5 km	MPC · JPL
71035	1999 XR_{71}	—	December 7, 1999	Socorro	LINEAR	·	4.4 km	MPC · JPL
71036	1999 XR_{72}	—	December 7, 1999	Socorro	LINEAR	·	3.7 km	MPC · JPL
71037	1999 XF_{73}	—	December 7, 1999	Socorro	LINEAR	·	3.4 km	MPC · JPL
71038	1999 XL_{73}	—	December 7, 1999	Socorro	LINEAR	PAD · slow	4.1 km	MPC · JPL
71039	1999 XZ_{73}	—	December 7, 1999	Socorro	LINEAR	·	5.2 km	MPC · JPL
71040	1999 XG_{74}	—	December 7, 1999	Socorro	LINEAR	fast	3.9 km	MPC · JPL
71041	1999 XQ_{74}	—	December 7, 1999	Socorro	LINEAR	EOS · slow	5.9 km	MPC · JPL
71042	1999 XN_{77}	—	December 7, 1999	Socorro	LINEAR	·	6.4 km	MPC · JPL
71043	1999 XB_{78}	—	December 7, 1999	Socorro	LINEAR	·	4.3 km	MPC · JPL
71044	1999 XT_{81}	—	December 7, 1999	Socorro	LINEAR	·	3.3 km	MPC · JPL
71045	1999 XY_{84}	—	December 7, 1999	Socorro	LINEAR	·	4.6 km	MPC · JPL
71046	1999 XC_{85}	—	December 7, 1999	Socorro	LINEAR	·	5.6 km	MPC · JPL
71047	1999 XC_{86}	—	December 7, 1999	Socorro	LINEAR	·	3.6 km	MPC · JPL
71048	1999 XA_{87}	—	December 7, 1999	Socorro	LINEAR	EUN	5.5 km	MPC · JPL
71049	1999 XG_{88}	—	December 7, 1999	Socorro	LINEAR	KOR ·	5.4 km	MPC · JPL
71050	1999 XY_{88}	—	December 7, 1999	Socorro	LINEAR	·	5.5 km	MPC · JPL
71051	1999 XN_{89}	—	December 7, 1999	Socorro	LINEAR	KOR	4.2 km	MPC · JPL
71052	1999 XP_{91}	—	December 7, 1999	Socorro	LINEAR	·	5.1 km	MPC · JPL
71053	1999 XB_{93}	—	December 7, 1999	Socorro	LINEAR	KOR	2.9 km	MPC · JPL
71054	1999 XU_{93}	—	December 7, 1999	Socorro	LINEAR	·	5.0 km	MPC · JPL
71055	1999 XV_{93}	—	December 7, 1999	Socorro	LINEAR	·	4.8 km	MPC · JPL
71056	1999 XY_{95}	—	December 9, 1999	Oizumi	T. Kobayashi	MRX	3.1 km	MPC · JPL
71057	1999 XE_{96}	—	December 7, 1999	Socorro	LINEAR	·	4.9 km	MPC · JPL
71058	1999 XL_{96}	—	December 7, 1999	Socorro	LINEAR	·	5.3 km	MPC · JPL
71059	1999 XP_{96}	—	December 7, 1999	Socorro	LINEAR	GEF	3.1 km	MPC · JPL
71060	1999 XL_{98}	—	December 7, 1999	Socorro	LINEAR	·	5.7 km	MPC · JPL
71061	1999 XS_{98}	—	December 7, 1999	Socorro	LINEAR	EOS	7.2 km	MPC · JPL
71062	1999 XO_{99}	—	December 7, 1999	Socorro	LINEAR	(5)	4.3 km	MPC · JPL
71063	1999 XH_{101}	—	December 7, 1999	Socorro	LINEAR	EOS	7.8 km	MPC · JPL
71064	1999 XX_{103}	—	December 8, 1999	Socorro	LINEAR	·	3.3 km	MPC · JPL
71065	1999 XY_{105}	—	December 11, 1999	Oizumi	T. Kobayashi	(5)	2.8 km	MPC · JPL
71066	1999 XL_{106}	—	December 4, 1999	Catalina	CSS	MAR	3.2 km	MPC · JPL
71067	1999 XX_{108}	—	December 4, 1999	Catalina	CSS	·	4.0 km	MPC · JPL
71068	1999 XY_{109}	—	December 4, 1999	Catalina	CSS	·	5.6 km	MPC · JPL
71069	1999 XB_{110}	—	December 4, 1999	Catalina	CSS	·	3.0 km	MPC · JPL
71070	1999 XA_{112}	—	December 7, 1999	Socorro	LINEAR	·	5.2 km	MPC · JPL
71071	1999 XH_{112}	—	December 10, 1999	Socorro	LINEAR	EUN	3.1 km	MPC · JPL
71072	1999 XL_{112}	—	December 10, 1999	Socorro	LINEAR	·	8.5 km	MPC · JPL
71073	1999 XE_{113}	—	December 11, 1999	Socorro	LINEAR	HNS	3.0 km	MPC · JPL
71074	1999 XR_{115}	—	December 5, 1999	Catalina	CSS	·	3.5 km	MPC · JPL
71075	1999 XB_{117}	—	December 5, 1999	Catalina	CSS	·	5.2 km	MPC · JPL
71076	1999 XV_{117}	—	December 5, 1999	Catalina	CSS	EUN	3.2 km	MPC · JPL
71077	1999 XZ_{117}	—	December 5, 1999	Catalina	CSS	·	4.0 km	MPC · JPL
71078	1999 XF_{118}	—	December 5, 1999	Catalina	CSS	EUN	2.6 km	MPC · JPL
71079	1999 XO_{118}	—	December 5, 1999	Catalina	CSS	·	2.0 km	MPC · JPL
71080	1999 XD_{119}	—	December 5, 1999	Catalina	CSS	RAF	2.3 km	MPC · JPL
71081	1999 XL_{119}	—	December 5, 1999	Catalina	CSS	·	5.6 km	MPC · JPL
71082	1999 XV_{120}	—	December 5, 1999	Catalina	CSS	·	3.2 km	MPC · JPL
71083	1999 XO_{121}	—	December 5, 1999	Catalina	CSS	·	3.4 km	MPC · JPL
71084	1999 XQ_{121}	—	December 5, 1999	Catalina	CSS	·	3.3 km	MPC · JPL
71085	1999 XX_{122}	—	December 7, 1999	Catalina	CSS	WIT	2.0 km	MPC · JPL
71086	1999 XT_{125}	—	December 7, 1999	Catalina	CSS	·	3.8 km	MPC · JPL
71087	1999 XV_{127}	—	December 13, 1999	Ondřejov	P. Kušnirák	·	8.2 km	MPC · JPL
71088	1999 XK_{129}	—	December 12, 1999	Socorro	LINEAR	·	3.1 km	MPC · JPL
71089	1999 XH_{132}	—	December 12, 1999	Socorro	LINEAR	·	4.1 km	MPC · JPL
71090	1999 XW_{132}	—	December 12, 1999	Socorro	LINEAR	EOS	4.8 km	MPC · JPL
71091	1999 XN_{133}	—	December 12, 1999	Socorro	LINEAR	·	4.4 km	MPC · JPL
71092	1999 XO_{133}	—	December 12, 1999	Socorro	LINEAR	·	4.5 km	MPC · JPL
71093	1999 XW_{133}	—	December 12, 1999	Socorro	LINEAR	EOS	6.7 km	MPC · JPL
71094	1999 XZ_{133}	—	December 12, 1999	Socorro	LINEAR	·	4.2 km	MPC · JPL
71095	1999 XM_{134}	—	December 12, 1999	Socorro	LINEAR	EUN	3.7 km	MPC · JPL
71096	1999 XR_{136}	—	December 13, 1999	Fountain Hills	C. W. Juels	slow	5.4 km	MPC · JPL
71097	1999 XQ_{137}	—	December 3, 1999	Anderson Mesa	LONEOS	·	6.0 km	MPC · JPL
71098	1999 XV_{137}	—	December 11, 1999	Uccle	T. Pauwels	·	13 km	MPC · JPL
71099	1999 XQ_{138}	—	December 5, 1999	Kitt Peak	Spacewatch	KOR	3.5 km	MPC · JPL
71100	1999 XV_{139}	—	December 2, 1999	Kitt Peak	Spacewatch	·	5.3 km	MPC · JPL

== 71101–71200 ==
back to top

Designation			Discovery			Properties		Ref
Permanent	Provisional	Named after	Date	Site	Discoverer(s)	Category	Diam.	Ref
71101	1999 XY_{140}	—	December 2, 1999	Kitt Peak	Spacewatch	·	3.1 km	MPC · JPL
71102	1999 XH_{144}	—	December 15, 1999	Fountain Hills	C. W. Juels	·	4.5 km	MPC · JPL
71103	1999 XN_{144}	—	December 11, 1999	Oohira	T. Urata	·	3.6 km	MPC · JPL
71104	1999 XA_{145}	—	December 7, 1999	Kitt Peak	Spacewatch	·	2.7 km	MPC · JPL
71105	1999 XP_{151}	—	December 7, 1999	Kitt Peak	Spacewatch	LEO	6.5 km	MPC · JPL
71106	1999 XS_{151}	—	December 7, 1999	Kitt Peak	Spacewatch	·	5.5 km	MPC · JPL
71107	1999 XT_{151}	—	December 7, 1999	Kitt Peak	Spacewatch	EOS	3.9 km	MPC · JPL
71108	1999 XL_{153}	—	December 7, 1999	Socorro	LINEAR	EOS	5.3 km	MPC · JPL
71109	1999 XN_{153}	—	December 7, 1999	Socorro	LINEAR	GEF	4.7 km	MPC · JPL
71110	1999 XZ_{154}	—	December 8, 1999	Socorro	LINEAR	·	3.9 km	MPC · JPL
71111	1999 XO_{155}	—	December 8, 1999	Socorro	LINEAR	·	6.5 km	MPC · JPL
71112	1999 XP_{155}	—	December 8, 1999	Socorro	LINEAR	·	3.3 km	MPC · JPL
71113	1999 XV_{155}	—	December 8, 1999	Socorro	LINEAR	PAD	5.0 km	MPC · JPL
71114	1999 XY_{155}	—	December 8, 1999	Socorro	LINEAR	HOF	6.6 km	MPC · JPL
71115	1999 XW_{156}	—	December 8, 1999	Socorro	LINEAR	EOS	5.5 km	MPC · JPL
71116	1999 XO_{157}	—	December 8, 1999	Socorro	LINEAR	HYG	6.1 km	MPC · JPL
71117	1999 XW_{157}	—	December 8, 1999	Socorro	LINEAR	EUN	3.7 km	MPC · JPL
71118	1999 XH_{159}	—	December 8, 1999	Socorro	LINEAR	·	4.2 km	MPC · JPL
71119	1999 XJ_{161}	—	December 12, 1999	Socorro	LINEAR	EUN	5.9 km	MPC · JPL
71120	1999 XJ_{162}	—	December 13, 1999	Socorro	LINEAR	·	3.1 km	MPC · JPL
71121	1999 XY_{163}	—	December 8, 1999	Socorro	LINEAR	·	3.0 km	MPC · JPL
71122	1999 XC_{165}	—	December 8, 1999	Socorro	LINEAR	DOR	7.1 km	MPC · JPL
71123	1999 XM_{168}	—	December 10, 1999	Socorro	LINEAR	MAR	2.5 km	MPC · JPL
71124	1999 XR_{173}	—	December 10, 1999	Socorro	LINEAR	EUN	4.7 km	MPC · JPL
71125	1999 XY_{173}	—	December 10, 1999	Socorro	LINEAR	GEF	3.4 km	MPC · JPL
71126	1999 XU_{174}	—	December 10, 1999	Socorro	LINEAR	EUN	3.9 km	MPC · JPL
71127	1999 XX_{175}	—	December 10, 1999	Socorro	LINEAR	GEF	5.0 km	MPC · JPL
71128	1999 XO_{176}	—	December 10, 1999	Socorro	LINEAR	·	9.6 km	MPC · JPL
71129	1999 XQ_{176}	—	December 10, 1999	Socorro	LINEAR	·	3.5 km	MPC · JPL
71130	1999 XX_{176}	—	December 10, 1999	Socorro	LINEAR	·	6.0 km	MPC · JPL
71131	1999 XY_{176}	—	December 10, 1999	Socorro	LINEAR	·	4.3 km	MPC · JPL
71132	1999 XB_{177}	—	December 10, 1999	Socorro	LINEAR	·	6.7 km	MPC · JPL
71133	1999 XQ_{177}	—	December 10, 1999	Socorro	LINEAR	·	5.5 km	MPC · JPL
71134	1999 XR_{177}	—	December 10, 1999	Socorro	LINEAR	·	4.7 km	MPC · JPL
71135	1999 XM_{178}	—	December 10, 1999	Socorro	LINEAR	·	13 km	MPC · JPL
71136	1999 XV_{178}	—	December 10, 1999	Socorro	LINEAR	·	9.4 km	MPC · JPL
71137	1999 XQ_{179}	—	December 10, 1999	Socorro	LINEAR	·	7.5 km	MPC · JPL
71138	1999 XY_{179}	—	December 10, 1999	Socorro	LINEAR	·	4.1 km	MPC · JPL
71139	1999 XB_{180}	—	December 10, 1999	Socorro	LINEAR	EOS	5.8 km	MPC · JPL
71140	1999 XK_{180}	—	December 10, 1999	Socorro	LINEAR	·	7.8 km	MPC · JPL
71141	1999 XX_{180}	—	December 12, 1999	Socorro	LINEAR	EUN	3.2 km	MPC · JPL
71142	1999 XP_{181}	—	December 12, 1999	Socorro	LINEAR	·	4.0 km	MPC · JPL
71143	1999 XR_{181}	—	December 12, 1999	Socorro	LINEAR	EUN	5.0 km	MPC · JPL
71144	1999 XW_{182}	—	December 12, 1999	Socorro	LINEAR	·	3.7 km	MPC · JPL
71145	1999 XA_{183}	—	December 12, 1999	Socorro	LINEAR	MAR	6.1 km	MPC · JPL
71146	1999 XQ_{183}	—	December 12, 1999	Socorro	LINEAR	GEF	3.2 km	MPC · JPL
71147	1999 XZ_{183}	—	December 12, 1999	Socorro	LINEAR	·	3.9 km	MPC · JPL
71148	1999 XV_{184}	—	December 12, 1999	Socorro	LINEAR	EUN	3.6 km	MPC · JPL
71149	1999 XE_{186}	—	December 12, 1999	Socorro	LINEAR	EUN	5.3 km	MPC · JPL
71150	1999 XW_{186}	—	December 12, 1999	Socorro	LINEAR	·	3.6 km	MPC · JPL
71151	1999 XZ_{188}	—	December 12, 1999	Socorro	LINEAR	GEF	2.7 km	MPC · JPL
71152	1999 XM_{189}	—	December 12, 1999	Socorro	LINEAR	·	3.5 km	MPC · JPL
71153	1999 XR_{190}	—	December 12, 1999	Socorro	LINEAR	·	5.5 km	MPC · JPL
71154	1999 XJ_{192}	—	December 12, 1999	Socorro	LINEAR	·	8.3 km	MPC · JPL
71155	1999 XP_{193}	—	December 12, 1999	Socorro	LINEAR	EUN	4.7 km	MPC · JPL
71156	1999 XA_{194}	—	December 12, 1999	Socorro	LINEAR	·	4.2 km	MPC · JPL
71157	1999 XD_{194}	—	December 12, 1999	Socorro	LINEAR	EOS	5.5 km	MPC · JPL
71158	1999 XQ_{194}	—	December 12, 1999	Socorro	LINEAR	EOS	6.5 km	MPC · JPL
71159	1999 XK_{195}	—	December 12, 1999	Socorro	LINEAR	EOS	5.6 km	MPC · JPL
71160	1999 XS_{195}	—	December 12, 1999	Socorro	LINEAR	·	4.3 km	MPC · JPL
71161	1999 XX_{195}	—	December 12, 1999	Socorro	LINEAR	GEF ·	5.4 km	MPC · JPL
71162	1999 XX_{197}	—	December 12, 1999	Socorro	LINEAR	EOS	6.0 km	MPC · JPL
71163	1999 XU_{199}	—	December 12, 1999	Socorro	LINEAR	·	6.3 km	MPC · JPL
71164	1999 XF_{202}	—	December 12, 1999	Socorro	LINEAR	·	4.5 km	MPC · JPL
71165	1999 XJ_{202}	—	December 12, 1999	Socorro	LINEAR	EOS	4.9 km	MPC · JPL
71166	1999 XL_{203}	—	December 12, 1999	Socorro	LINEAR	URS	11 km	MPC · JPL
71167	1999 XZ_{203}	—	December 12, 1999	Socorro	LINEAR	·	4.7 km	MPC · JPL
71168	1999 XQ_{204}	—	December 12, 1999	Socorro	LINEAR	EUN	3.6 km	MPC · JPL
71169	1999 XV_{204}	—	December 12, 1999	Socorro	LINEAR	·	4.0 km	MPC · JPL
71170	1999 XE_{206}	—	December 12, 1999	Socorro	LINEAR	EOS	5.2 km	MPC · JPL
71171	1999 XG_{206}	—	December 12, 1999	Socorro	LINEAR	·	5.2 km	MPC · JPL
71172	1999 XK_{206}	—	December 12, 1999	Socorro	LINEAR	·	8.6 km	MPC · JPL
71173	1999 XA_{209}	—	December 13, 1999	Socorro	LINEAR	·	4.3 km	MPC · JPL
71174	1999 XO_{210}	—	December 13, 1999	Socorro	LINEAR	slow	5.6 km	MPC · JPL
71175	1999 XS_{212}	—	December 14, 1999	Socorro	LINEAR	·	3.1 km	MPC · JPL
71176	1999 XT_{212}	—	December 14, 1999	Socorro	LINEAR	·	3.6 km	MPC · JPL
71177	1999 XA_{213}	—	December 14, 1999	Socorro	LINEAR	·	5.0 km	MPC · JPL
71178	1999 XB_{213}	—	December 14, 1999	Socorro	LINEAR	RAF	2.8 km	MPC · JPL
71179	1999 XM_{213}	—	December 14, 1999	Socorro	LINEAR	·	4.6 km	MPC · JPL
71180	1999 XG_{214}	—	December 14, 1999	Socorro	LINEAR	EOS	6.4 km	MPC · JPL
71181	1999 XA_{215}	—	December 14, 1999	Socorro	LINEAR	·	5.3 km	MPC · JPL
71182	1999 XB_{215}	—	December 14, 1999	Socorro	LINEAR	HOF	5.6 km	MPC · JPL
71183	1999 XO_{215}	—	December 14, 1999	Socorro	LINEAR	·	2.6 km	MPC · JPL
71184	1999 XJ_{217}	—	December 13, 1999	Kitt Peak	Spacewatch	·	2.9 km	MPC · JPL
71185	1999 XS_{220}	—	December 14, 1999	Socorro	LINEAR	·	3.2 km	MPC · JPL
71186	1999 XX_{222}	—	December 15, 1999	Socorro	LINEAR	EOS	4.7 km	MPC · JPL
71187	1999 XG_{224}	—	December 13, 1999	Kitt Peak	Spacewatch	·	5.2 km	MPC · JPL
71188	1999 XH_{224}	—	December 13, 1999	Kitt Peak	Spacewatch	·	5.2 km	MPC · JPL
71189	1999 XL_{229}	—	December 7, 1999	Catalina	CSS	ADE	5.8 km	MPC · JPL
71190	1999 XO_{229}	—	December 7, 1999	Catalina	CSS	GEF	3.2 km	MPC · JPL
71191	1999 XX_{229}	—	December 7, 1999	Catalina	CSS	·	6.9 km	MPC · JPL
71192	1999 XC_{230}	—	December 7, 1999	Catalina	CSS	·	5.8 km	MPC · JPL
71193	1999 XG_{231}	—	December 7, 1999	Catalina	CSS	·	15 km	MPC · JPL
71194	1999 XH_{231}	—	December 7, 1999	Catalina	CSS	·	12 km	MPC · JPL
71195	1999 XO_{231}	—	December 8, 1999	Catalina	CSS	·	7.3 km	MPC · JPL
71196	1999 XP_{233}	—	December 4, 1999	Anderson Mesa	LONEOS	PHO	6.1 km	MPC · JPL
71197	1999 XE_{234}	—	December 4, 1999	Anderson Mesa	LONEOS	·	5.1 km	MPC · JPL
71198	1999 XX_{234}	—	December 3, 1999	Anderson Mesa	LONEOS	·	2.3 km	MPC · JPL
71199	1999 XM_{236}	—	December 5, 1999	Anderson Mesa	LONEOS	EUN ·	6.5 km	MPC · JPL
71200	1999 XT_{236}	—	December 5, 1999	Catalina	CSS	·	6.6 km	MPC · JPL

== 71201–71300 ==
back to top

Designation			Discovery			Properties		Ref
Permanent	Provisional	Named after	Date	Site	Discoverer(s)	Category	Diam.	Ref
71201	1999 XL_{239}	—	December 7, 1999	Catalina	CSS	·	4.6 km	MPC · JPL
71202	1999 XJ_{241}	—	December 12, 1999	Catalina	CSS	·	4.6 km	MPC · JPL
71203	1999 XK_{242}	—	December 12, 1999	Socorro	LINEAR	·	4.5 km	MPC · JPL
71204	1999 XQ_{242}	—	December 13, 1999	Socorro	LINEAR	·	4.8 km	MPC · JPL
71205	1999 XD_{244}	—	December 6, 1999	Socorro	LINEAR	·	3.1 km	MPC · JPL
71206	1999 XK_{244}	—	December 3, 1999	Socorro	LINEAR	·	4.2 km	MPC · JPL
71207	1999 XB_{245}	—	December 5, 1999	Socorro	LINEAR	·	3.0 km	MPC · JPL
71208	1999 XO_{248}	—	December 6, 1999	Socorro	LINEAR	EUN	3.3 km	MPC · JPL
71209	1999 XX_{248}	—	December 6, 1999	Socorro	LINEAR	·	3.2 km	MPC · JPL
71210	1999 XE_{256}	—	December 6, 1999	Socorro	LINEAR	·	4.4 km	MPC · JPL
71211	1999 XO_{257}	—	December 7, 1999	Socorro	LINEAR	·	3.9 km	MPC · JPL
71212	1999 XX_{257}	—	December 7, 1999	Catalina	CSS	·	5.9 km	MPC · JPL
71213	1999 XA_{259}	—	December 7, 1999	Socorro	LINEAR	·	2.4 km	MPC · JPL
71214	1999 XG_{261}	—	December 3, 1999	Anderson Mesa	LONEOS	·	8.3 km	MPC · JPL
71215	1999 XY_{261}	—	December 3, 1999	Socorro	LINEAR	(10369)	11 km	MPC · JPL
71216	1999 YP_{1}	—	December 16, 1999	Socorro	LINEAR	JUN	2.0 km	MPC · JPL
71217	1999 YQ_{1}	—	December 16, 1999	Socorro	LINEAR	·	3.8 km	MPC · JPL
71218	1999 YF_{5}	—	December 27, 1999	Oizumi	T. Kobayashi	·	8.5 km	MPC · JPL
71219	1999 YK_{6}	—	December 30, 1999	Socorro	LINEAR	MAR	3.6 km	MPC · JPL
71220	1999 YY_{8}	—	December 31, 1999	Prescott	P. G. Comba	·	2.2 km	MPC · JPL
71221	1999 YL_{9}	—	December 31, 1999	San Marcello	M. Tombelli, L. Tesi	DOR	5.2 km	MPC · JPL
71222	1999 YQ_{9}	—	December 31, 1999	Oizumi	T. Kobayashi	·	4.9 km	MPC · JPL
71223	1999 YF_{10}	—	December 27, 1999	Kitt Peak	Spacewatch	·	3.5 km	MPC · JPL
71224	1999 YW_{12}	—	December 31, 1999	Kitt Peak	Spacewatch	EUN	2.5 km	MPC · JPL
71225	1999 YU_{13}	—	December 31, 1999	Višnjan Observatory	K. Korlević	THM	11 km	MPC · JPL
71226	1999 YG_{14}	—	December 31, 1999	Kitt Peak	Spacewatch	·	5.7 km	MPC · JPL
71227	1999 YO_{15}	—	December 31, 1999	Kitt Peak	Spacewatch	·	3.0 km	MPC · JPL
71228	1999 YP_{15}	—	December 31, 1999	Kitt Peak	Spacewatch	·	3.8 km	MPC · JPL
71229	1999 YD_{17}	—	December 31, 1999	Kitt Peak	Spacewatch	·	5.5 km	MPC · JPL
71230	1999 YR_{17}	—	December 17, 1999	Xinglong	SCAP	TIR · slow	10 km	MPC · JPL
71231	1999 YY_{22}	—	December 31, 1999	Kitt Peak	Spacewatch	GEF	2.2 km	MPC · JPL
71232	1999 YH_{26}	—	December 30, 1999	Socorro	LINEAR	EUN	4.3 km	MPC · JPL
71233	2000 AC	—	January 1, 2000	Višnjan Observatory	K. Korlević	·	5.4 km	MPC · JPL
71234	2000 AE_{2}	—	January 3, 2000	Oizumi	T. Kobayashi	·	3.9 km	MPC · JPL
71235	2000 AD_{3}	—	January 4, 2000	Prescott	P. G. Comba	·	6.8 km	MPC · JPL
71236	2000 AC_{5}	—	January 3, 2000	Chiyoda	T. Kojima	·	6.9 km	MPC · JPL
71237	2000 AJ_{7}	—	January 2, 2000	Socorro	LINEAR	PAD	7.1 km	MPC · JPL
71238	2000 AL_{7}	—	January 2, 2000	Socorro	LINEAR	·	3.1 km	MPC · JPL
71239	2000 AM_{7}	—	January 2, 2000	Socorro	LINEAR	GEF	4.5 km	MPC · JPL
71240	2000 AU_{7}	—	January 2, 2000	Socorro	LINEAR	MAR	3.0 km	MPC · JPL
71241	2000 AG_{8}	—	January 2, 2000	Socorro	LINEAR	RAF	2.2 km	MPC · JPL
71242	2000 AQ_{8}	—	January 2, 2000	Socorro	LINEAR	·	2.6 km	MPC · JPL
71243	2000 AK_{9}	—	January 2, 2000	Socorro	LINEAR	·	6.4 km	MPC · JPL
71244	2000 AM_{9}	—	January 2, 2000	Socorro	LINEAR	·	4.0 km	MPC · JPL
71245	2000 AE_{10}	—	January 3, 2000	Socorro	LINEAR	·	3.0 km	MPC · JPL
71246	2000 AB_{11}	—	January 3, 2000	Socorro	LINEAR	·	3.5 km	MPC · JPL
71247	2000 AJ_{11}	—	January 3, 2000	Socorro	LINEAR	LEO	5.2 km	MPC · JPL
71248	2000 AJ_{13}	—	January 3, 2000	Socorro	LINEAR	·	3.4 km	MPC · JPL
71249	2000 AK_{14}	—	January 3, 2000	Socorro	LINEAR	EUN	3.8 km	MPC · JPL
71250	2000 AS_{14}	—	January 3, 2000	Socorro	LINEAR	·	2.9 km	MPC · JPL
71251	2000 AH_{15}	—	January 3, 2000	Socorro	LINEAR	PAD	6.1 km	MPC · JPL
71252	2000 AR_{15}	—	January 3, 2000	Socorro	LINEAR	EOS	4.5 km	MPC · JPL
71253	2000 AT_{15}	—	January 3, 2000	Socorro	LINEAR	·	3.3 km	MPC · JPL
71254	2000 AV_{15}	—	January 3, 2000	Socorro	LINEAR	·	5.6 km	MPC · JPL
71255	2000 AU_{16}	—	January 3, 2000	Socorro	LINEAR	·	3.4 km	MPC · JPL
71256	2000 AV_{16}	—	January 3, 2000	Socorro	LINEAR	·	8.8 km	MPC · JPL
71257	2000 AV_{17}	—	January 3, 2000	Socorro	LINEAR	·	5.0 km	MPC · JPL
71258	2000 AO_{20}	—	January 3, 2000	Socorro	LINEAR	·	4.0 km	MPC · JPL
71259	2000 AX_{22}	—	January 3, 2000	Socorro	LINEAR	·	5.5 km	MPC · JPL
71260	2000 AB_{23}	—	January 3, 2000	Socorro	LINEAR	MRX	2.7 km	MPC · JPL
71261	2000 AC_{23}	—	January 3, 2000	Socorro	LINEAR	·	4.9 km	MPC · JPL
71262	2000 AR_{23}	—	January 3, 2000	Socorro	LINEAR	HOF	6.5 km	MPC · JPL
71263	2000 AN_{25}	—	January 3, 2000	Socorro	LINEAR	·	7.3 km	MPC · JPL
71264	2000 AT_{27}	—	January 3, 2000	Socorro	LINEAR	·	5.1 km	MPC · JPL
71265	2000 AW_{27}	—	January 3, 2000	Socorro	LINEAR	·	4.3 km	MPC · JPL
71266	2000 AC_{28}	—	January 3, 2000	Socorro	LINEAR	KOR	3.2 km	MPC · JPL
71267	2000 AL_{29}	—	January 3, 2000	Socorro	LINEAR	·	7.2 km	MPC · JPL
71268	2000 AF_{30}	—	January 3, 2000	Socorro	LINEAR	KOR	3.4 km	MPC · JPL
71269	2000 AK_{31}	—	January 3, 2000	Socorro	LINEAR	·	4.8 km	MPC · JPL
71270	2000 AZ_{31}	—	January 3, 2000	Socorro	LINEAR	GEF	3.1 km	MPC · JPL
71271	2000 AB_{32}	—	January 3, 2000	Socorro	LINEAR	·	9.6 km	MPC · JPL
71272	2000 AY_{33}	—	January 3, 2000	Socorro	LINEAR	·	6.8 km	MPC · JPL
71273	2000 AG_{35}	—	January 3, 2000	Socorro	LINEAR	EOS	5.6 km	MPC · JPL
71274	2000 AC_{37}	—	January 3, 2000	Socorro	LINEAR	EOS	6.9 km	MPC · JPL
71275	2000 AM_{39}	—	January 3, 2000	Socorro	LINEAR	EOS	3.8 km	MPC · JPL
71276	2000 AX_{39}	—	January 3, 2000	Socorro	LINEAR	·	3.9 km	MPC · JPL
71277	2000 AH_{44}	—	January 5, 2000	Kitt Peak	Spacewatch	·	2.3 km	MPC · JPL
71278	2000 AR_{45}	—	January 3, 2000	Socorro	LINEAR	·	7.3 km	MPC · JPL
71279	2000 AX_{45}	—	January 3, 2000	Socorro	LINEAR	·	6.8 km	MPC · JPL
71280	2000 AZ_{46}	—	January 4, 2000	Socorro	LINEAR	EOS	5.6 km	MPC · JPL
71281	2000 AD_{47}	—	January 4, 2000	Socorro	LINEAR	GEF	2.8 km	MPC · JPL
71282 Holuby	2000 AC_{48}	Holuby	January 6, 2000	Modra	A. Galád, P. Kolény	EOS	6.4 km	MPC · JPL
71283	2000 AB_{50}	—	January 4, 2000	Višnjan Observatory	K. Korlević	EOS	3.7 km	MPC · JPL
71284	2000 AE_{50}	—	January 5, 2000	Višnjan Observatory	K. Korlević	THM	5.2 km	MPC · JPL
71285	2000 AB_{51}	—	January 3, 2000	Socorro	LINEAR	·	3.9 km	MPC · JPL
71286	2000 AX_{51}	—	January 4, 2000	Socorro	LINEAR	V	2.0 km	MPC · JPL
71287	2000 AM_{52}	—	January 4, 2000	Socorro	LINEAR	GEF	3.1 km	MPC · JPL
71288	2000 AD_{53}	—	January 4, 2000	Socorro	LINEAR	EUN	2.8 km	MPC · JPL
71289	2000 AZ_{53}	—	January 4, 2000	Socorro	LINEAR	EOS	5.6 km	MPC · JPL
71290	2000 AP_{54}	—	January 4, 2000	Socorro	LINEAR	MRX	2.6 km	MPC · JPL
71291	2000 AS_{56}	—	January 4, 2000	Socorro	LINEAR	·	2.8 km	MPC · JPL
71292	2000 AO_{57}	—	January 4, 2000	Socorro	LINEAR	·	3.4 km	MPC · JPL
71293	2000 AX_{58}	—	January 4, 2000	Socorro	LINEAR	·	4.6 km	MPC · JPL
71294	2000 AB_{59}	—	January 4, 2000	Socorro	LINEAR	·	3.4 km	MPC · JPL
71295	2000 AG_{59}	—	January 4, 2000	Socorro	LINEAR	·	3.9 km	MPC · JPL
71296	2000 AH_{60}	—	January 4, 2000	Socorro	LINEAR	MRX	2.2 km	MPC · JPL
71297	2000 AF_{62}	—	January 4, 2000	Socorro	LINEAR	EUN · slow	3.9 km	MPC · JPL
71298	2000 AH_{62}	—	January 4, 2000	Socorro	LINEAR	·	9.7 km	MPC · JPL
71299	2000 AY_{62}	—	January 4, 2000	Socorro	LINEAR	·	5.5 km	MPC · JPL
71300	2000 AB_{65}	—	January 4, 2000	Socorro	LINEAR	EUN	4.1 km	MPC · JPL

== 71301–71400 ==
back to top

Designation			Discovery			Properties		Ref
Permanent	Provisional	Named after	Date	Site	Discoverer(s)	Category	Diam.	Ref
71301	2000 AY_{65}	—	January 4, 2000	Socorro	LINEAR	EOS	3.9 km	MPC · JPL
71302	2000 AU_{66}	—	January 4, 2000	Socorro	LINEAR	EOS	5.4 km	MPC · JPL
71303	2000 AZ_{67}	—	January 4, 2000	Socorro	LINEAR	KOR	3.7 km	MPC · JPL
71304	2000 AE_{68}	—	January 4, 2000	Socorro	LINEAR	·	8.5 km	MPC · JPL
71305	2000 AG_{68}	—	January 5, 2000	Socorro	LINEAR	MAR	3.5 km	MPC · JPL
71306	2000 AS_{69}	—	January 5, 2000	Socorro	LINEAR	EUN	4.2 km	MPC · JPL
71307	2000 AO_{70}	—	January 5, 2000	Socorro	LINEAR	NEM	3.9 km	MPC · JPL
71308	2000 AU_{70}	—	January 5, 2000	Socorro	LINEAR	·	4.4 km	MPC · JPL
71309	2000 AS_{71}	—	January 5, 2000	Socorro	LINEAR	·	5.9 km	MPC · JPL
71310	2000 AJ_{74}	—	January 5, 2000	Socorro	LINEAR	(5)	3.0 km	MPC · JPL
71311	2000 AO_{75}	—	January 5, 2000	Socorro	LINEAR	·	3.3 km	MPC · JPL
71312	2000 AT_{75}	—	January 5, 2000	Socorro	LINEAR	EUN	3.6 km	MPC · JPL
71313	2000 AS_{76}	—	January 5, 2000	Socorro	LINEAR	·	5.9 km	MPC · JPL
71314	2000 AW_{76}	—	January 5, 2000	Socorro	LINEAR	KOR	3.5 km	MPC · JPL
71315	2000 AM_{77}	—	January 5, 2000	Socorro	LINEAR	·	3.7 km	MPC · JPL
71316	2000 AA_{78}	—	January 5, 2000	Socorro	LINEAR	·	3.2 km	MPC · JPL
71317	2000 AY_{78}	—	January 5, 2000	Socorro	LINEAR	·	3.9 km	MPC · JPL
71318	2000 AO_{81}	—	January 5, 2000	Socorro	LINEAR	·	3.5 km	MPC · JPL
71319	2000 AQ_{82}	—	January 5, 2000	Socorro	LINEAR	·	5.1 km	MPC · JPL
71320	2000 AV_{82}	—	January 5, 2000	Socorro	LINEAR	·	8.6 km	MPC · JPL
71321	2000 AB_{83}	—	January 5, 2000	Socorro	LINEAR	HYG	6.5 km	MPC · JPL
71322	2000 AP_{83}	—	January 5, 2000	Socorro	LINEAR	KOR	3.9 km	MPC · JPL
71323	2000 AF_{84}	—	January 5, 2000	Socorro	LINEAR	HOF	6.5 km	MPC · JPL
71324	2000 AJ_{84}	—	January 5, 2000	Socorro	LINEAR	·	8.7 km	MPC · JPL
71325	2000 AN_{84}	—	January 5, 2000	Socorro	LINEAR	·	4.7 km	MPC · JPL
71326	2000 AU_{84}	—	January 5, 2000	Socorro	LINEAR	EOS	6.3 km	MPC · JPL
71327	2000 AA_{85}	—	January 5, 2000	Socorro	LINEAR	THM	6.1 km	MPC · JPL
71328	2000 AH_{85}	—	January 5, 2000	Socorro	LINEAR	DOR	7.9 km	MPC · JPL
71329	2000 AH_{86}	—	January 5, 2000	Socorro	LINEAR	·	8.7 km	MPC · JPL
71330	2000 AZ_{86}	—	January 5, 2000	Socorro	LINEAR	·	9.1 km	MPC · JPL
71331	2000 AY_{89}	—	January 5, 2000	Socorro	LINEAR	·	3.8 km	MPC · JPL
71332	2000 AQ_{90}	—	January 5, 2000	Socorro	LINEAR	EOS	4.3 km	MPC · JPL
71333	2000 AW_{91}	—	January 5, 2000	Socorro	LINEAR	·	10 km	MPC · JPL
71334	2000 AP_{94}	—	January 4, 2000	Socorro	LINEAR	EOS	5.3 km	MPC · JPL
71335	2000 AK_{96}	—	January 4, 2000	Socorro	LINEAR	·	5.4 km	MPC · JPL
71336	2000 AE_{99}	—	January 5, 2000	Socorro	LINEAR	·	4.3 km	MPC · JPL
71337	2000 AG_{99}	—	January 5, 2000	Socorro	LINEAR	NYS	2.8 km	MPC · JPL
71338	2000 AK_{99}	—	January 5, 2000	Socorro	LINEAR	EUN	2.9 km	MPC · JPL
71339	2000 AR_{99}	—	January 5, 2000	Socorro	LINEAR	·	3.9 km	MPC · JPL
71340	2000 AW_{99}	—	January 5, 2000	Socorro	LINEAR	slow	4.3 km	MPC · JPL
71341	2000 AD_{101}	—	January 5, 2000	Socorro	LINEAR	V	2.9 km	MPC · JPL
71342	2000 AJ_{102}	—	January 5, 2000	Socorro	LINEAR	·	5.6 km	MPC · JPL
71343	2000 AV_{102}	—	January 5, 2000	Socorro	LINEAR	DOR	8.6 km	MPC · JPL
71344	2000 AF_{103}	—	January 5, 2000	Socorro	LINEAR	(5)	3.0 km	MPC · JPL
71345	2000 AH_{104}	—	January 5, 2000	Socorro	LINEAR	·	4.8 km	MPC · JPL
71346	2000 AV_{104}	—	January 5, 2000	Socorro	LINEAR	WAT	5.2 km	MPC · JPL
71347	2000 AH_{105}	—	January 5, 2000	Socorro	LINEAR	·	4.8 km	MPC · JPL
71348	2000 AL_{107}	—	January 5, 2000	Socorro	LINEAR	·	5.0 km	MPC · JPL
71349	2000 AP_{107}	—	January 5, 2000	Socorro	LINEAR	·	5.2 km	MPC · JPL
71350	2000 AF_{108}	—	January 5, 2000	Socorro	LINEAR	KOR	3.4 km	MPC · JPL
71351	2000 AJ_{108}	—	January 5, 2000	Socorro	LINEAR	·	3.3 km	MPC · JPL
71352	2000 AH_{109}	—	January 5, 2000	Socorro	LINEAR	·	8.2 km	MPC · JPL
71353	2000 AT_{110}	—	January 5, 2000	Socorro	LINEAR	·	3.4 km	MPC · JPL
71354	2000 AO_{111}	—	January 5, 2000	Socorro	LINEAR	·	5.5 km	MPC · JPL
71355	2000 AE_{112}	—	January 5, 2000	Socorro	LINEAR	·	6.0 km	MPC · JPL
71356	2000 AR_{114}	—	January 5, 2000	Socorro	LINEAR	EOS	4.3 km	MPC · JPL
71357	2000 AJ_{122}	—	January 5, 2000	Socorro	LINEAR	·	5.2 km	MPC · JPL
71358	2000 AZ_{123}	—	January 5, 2000	Socorro	LINEAR	GEF	3.5 km	MPC · JPL
71359	2000 AF_{124}	—	January 5, 2000	Socorro	LINEAR	EOS	5.7 km	MPC · JPL
71360	2000 AT_{126}	—	January 5, 2000	Socorro	LINEAR	EOS	5.6 km	MPC · JPL
71361	2000 AP_{129}	—	January 5, 2000	Socorro	LINEAR	EOS	5.0 km	MPC · JPL
71362	2000 AB_{133}	—	January 3, 2000	Socorro	LINEAR	·	6.3 km	MPC · JPL
71363	2000 AK_{134}	—	January 4, 2000	Socorro	LINEAR	·	4.5 km	MPC · JPL
71364	2000 AW_{134}	—	January 4, 2000	Socorro	LINEAR	·	4.0 km	MPC · JPL
71365	2000 AY_{134}	—	January 4, 2000	Socorro	LINEAR	·	7.7 km	MPC · JPL
71366	2000 AU_{135}	—	January 4, 2000	Socorro	LINEAR	·	3.9 km	MPC · JPL
71367	2000 AO_{137}	—	January 4, 2000	Socorro	LINEAR	·	8.9 km	MPC · JPL
71368	2000 AX_{137}	—	January 4, 2000	Socorro	LINEAR	·	8.3 km	MPC · JPL
71369	2000 AJ_{139}	—	January 5, 2000	Socorro	LINEAR	ADE	8.3 km	MPC · JPL
71370	2000 AK_{139}	—	January 5, 2000	Socorro	LINEAR	·	3.6 km	MPC · JPL
71371	2000 AR_{139}	—	January 5, 2000	Socorro	LINEAR	EUN	4.2 km	MPC · JPL
71372	2000 AS_{139}	—	January 5, 2000	Socorro	LINEAR	·	2.8 km	MPC · JPL
71373	2000 AQ_{140}	—	January 5, 2000	Socorro	LINEAR	·	6.2 km	MPC · JPL
71374	2000 AJ_{141}	—	January 5, 2000	Socorro	LINEAR	·	5.4 km	MPC · JPL
71375	2000 AT_{141}	—	January 5, 2000	Socorro	LINEAR	·	9.3 km	MPC · JPL
71376	2000 AP_{143}	—	January 5, 2000	Socorro	LINEAR	·	6.1 km	MPC · JPL
71377	2000 AG_{145}	—	January 6, 2000	Socorro	LINEAR	EOS	5.2 km	MPC · JPL
71378	2000 AP_{145}	—	January 6, 2000	Socorro	LINEAR	·	4.7 km	MPC · JPL
71379	2000 AA_{146}	—	January 7, 2000	Socorro	LINEAR	·	4.6 km	MPC · JPL
71380	2000 AC_{148}	—	January 5, 2000	Socorro	LINEAR	·	4.3 km	MPC · JPL
71381	2000 AD_{149}	—	January 7, 2000	Socorro	LINEAR	V	3.0 km	MPC · JPL
71382	2000 AT_{149}	—	January 7, 2000	Socorro	LINEAR	DOR ·	7.6 km	MPC · JPL
71383	2000 AH_{151}	—	January 5, 2000	Kvistaberg	Uppsala-DLR Asteroid Survey	EUN	3.8 km	MPC · JPL
71384	2000 AQ_{151}	—	January 8, 2000	Socorro	LINEAR	V	2.0 km	MPC · JPL
71385	2000 AR_{151}	—	January 8, 2000	Socorro	LINEAR	·	2.3 km	MPC · JPL
71386	2000 AE_{153}	—	January 6, 2000	Višnjan Observatory	K. Korlević	HYG	8.4 km	MPC · JPL
71387	2000 AD_{154}	—	January 2, 2000	Socorro	LINEAR	EUN	3.4 km	MPC · JPL
71388	2000 AT_{154}	—	January 3, 2000	Socorro	LINEAR	·	4.2 km	MPC · JPL
71389	2000 AQ_{156}	—	January 3, 2000	Socorro	LINEAR	·	3.9 km	MPC · JPL
71390	2000 AB_{161}	—	January 3, 2000	Socorro	LINEAR	EOS	5.9 km	MPC · JPL
71391	2000 AK_{161}	—	January 3, 2000	Socorro	LINEAR	·	6.2 km	MPC · JPL
71392	2000 AV_{162}	—	January 5, 2000	Socorro	LINEAR	·	5.2 km	MPC · JPL
71393	2000 AA_{163}	—	January 5, 2000	Socorro	LINEAR	·	3.1 km	MPC · JPL
71394	2000 AX_{163}	—	January 5, 2000	Socorro	LINEAR	·	4.3 km	MPC · JPL
71395	2000 AA_{164}	—	January 5, 2000	Socorro	LINEAR	EOS	5.5 km	MPC · JPL
71396	2000 AV_{166}	—	January 8, 2000	Socorro	LINEAR	·	4.5 km	MPC · JPL
71397	2000 AJ_{167}	—	January 8, 2000	Socorro	LINEAR	·	9.0 km	MPC · JPL
71398	2000 AV_{168}	—	January 7, 2000	Socorro	LINEAR	MAR	3.3 km	MPC · JPL
71399	2000 AZ_{168}	—	January 7, 2000	Socorro	LINEAR	·	2.7 km	MPC · JPL
71400	2000 AF_{169}	—	January 7, 2000	Socorro	LINEAR	·	5.8 km	MPC · JPL

== 71401–71500 ==
back to top

Designation			Discovery			Properties		Ref
Permanent	Provisional	Named after	Date	Site	Discoverer(s)	Category	Diam.	Ref
71401	2000 AL_{170}	—	January 7, 2000	Socorro	LINEAR	·	5.8 km	MPC · JPL
71402	2000 AM_{170}	—	January 7, 2000	Socorro	LINEAR	·	4.9 km	MPC · JPL
71403	2000 AO_{170}	—	January 7, 2000	Socorro	LINEAR	EUN	4.3 km	MPC · JPL
71404	2000 AP_{172}	—	January 7, 2000	Socorro	LINEAR	·	5.1 km	MPC · JPL
71405	2000 AG_{173}	—	January 7, 2000	Socorro	LINEAR	·	3.3 km	MPC · JPL
71406	2000 AK_{173}	—	January 7, 2000	Socorro	LINEAR	ADE	6.5 km	MPC · JPL
71407	2000 AP_{175}	—	January 7, 2000	Socorro	LINEAR	MAR	3.5 km	MPC · JPL
71408	2000 AT_{175}	—	January 7, 2000	Socorro	LINEAR	EOS	4.6 km	MPC · JPL
71409	2000 AT_{178}	—	January 7, 2000	Socorro	LINEAR	·	6.3 km	MPC · JPL
71410	2000 AG_{179}	—	January 7, 2000	Socorro	LINEAR	·	5.1 km	MPC · JPL
71411	2000 AM_{180}	—	January 7, 2000	Socorro	LINEAR	EOS	5.1 km	MPC · JPL
71412	2000 AF_{181}	—	January 7, 2000	Socorro	LINEAR	·	4.7 km	MPC · JPL
71413	2000 AQ_{185}	—	January 8, 2000	Socorro	LINEAR	EUN	5.9 km	MPC · JPL
71414	2000 AW_{185}	—	January 8, 2000	Socorro	LINEAR	ADE	7.8 km	MPC · JPL
71415	2000 AD_{187}	—	January 8, 2000	Socorro	LINEAR	MAR	3.0 km	MPC · JPL
71416	2000 AY_{187}	—	January 8, 2000	Socorro	LINEAR	EUN	3.1 km	MPC · JPL
71417	2000 AE_{188}	—	January 8, 2000	Socorro	LINEAR	·	5.1 km	MPC · JPL
71418	2000 AU_{190}	—	January 8, 2000	Socorro	LINEAR	·	6.9 km	MPC · JPL
71419	2000 AH_{191}	—	January 8, 2000	Socorro	LINEAR	·	5.1 km	MPC · JPL
71420	2000 AP_{191}	—	January 8, 2000	Socorro	LINEAR	EUN	3.4 km	MPC · JPL
71421	2000 AJ_{192}	—	January 8, 2000	Socorro	LINEAR	EUN	2.9 km	MPC · JPL
71422	2000 AE_{195}	—	January 8, 2000	Socorro	LINEAR	·	4.4 km	MPC · JPL
71423	2000 AT_{195}	—	January 8, 2000	Socorro	LINEAR	·	4.5 km	MPC · JPL
71424	2000 AB_{197}	—	January 8, 2000	Socorro	LINEAR	·	4.2 km	MPC · JPL
71425	2000 AC_{197}	—	January 8, 2000	Socorro	LINEAR	·	8.9 km	MPC · JPL
71426	2000 AJ_{198}	—	January 8, 2000	Socorro	LINEAR	VER	7.8 km	MPC · JPL
71427	2000 AE_{199}	—	January 9, 2000	Socorro	LINEAR	EUN	3.7 km	MPC · JPL
71428	2000 AZ_{199}	—	January 9, 2000	Socorro	LINEAR	·	5.1 km	MPC · JPL
71429	2000 AZ_{200}	—	January 9, 2000	Socorro	LINEAR	·	6.1 km	MPC · JPL
71430	2000 AN_{201}	—	January 9, 2000	Socorro	LINEAR	TIR	7.5 km	MPC · JPL
71431	2000 AC_{202}	—	January 10, 2000	Socorro	LINEAR	EUN	2.4 km	MPC · JPL
71432	2000 AO_{202}	—	January 10, 2000	Socorro	LINEAR	ADE	6.6 km	MPC · JPL
71433	2000 AE_{203}	—	January 10, 2000	Socorro	LINEAR	·	5.1 km	MPC · JPL
71434	2000 AJ_{205}	—	January 15, 2000	Višnjan Observatory	K. Korlević	GEF	3.8 km	MPC · JPL
71435	2000 AN_{206}	—	January 3, 2000	Kitt Peak	Spacewatch	·	3.7 km	MPC · JPL
71436	2000 AF_{208}	—	January 4, 2000	Kitt Peak	Spacewatch	·	3.8 km	MPC · JPL
71437	2000 AE_{209}	—	January 4, 2000	Kitt Peak	Spacewatch	THM	5.3 km	MPC · JPL
71438	2000 AP_{213}	—	January 6, 2000	Kitt Peak	Spacewatch	·	3.6 km	MPC · JPL
71439	2000 AF_{214}	—	January 6, 2000	Kitt Peak	Spacewatch	EOS · slow	4.4 km	MPC · JPL
71440	2000 AL_{225}	—	January 12, 2000	Kitt Peak	Spacewatch	·	8.1 km	MPC · JPL
71441	2000 AR_{226}	—	January 13, 2000	Kitt Peak	Spacewatch	·	4.6 km	MPC · JPL
71442	2000 AA_{230}	—	January 3, 2000	Socorro	LINEAR	·	5.8 km	MPC · JPL
71443	2000 AG_{230}	—	January 3, 2000	Socorro	LINEAR	·	8.4 km	MPC · JPL
71444	2000 AH_{230}	—	January 3, 2000	Socorro	LINEAR	·	8.7 km	MPC · JPL
71445 Marc	2000 AE_{231}	Marc	January 4, 2000	Anderson Mesa	Wasserman, L. H.	·	3.0 km	MPC · JPL
71446	2000 AP_{237}	—	January 5, 2000	Anderson Mesa	LONEOS	·	10 km	MPC · JPL
71447	2000 AY_{239}	—	January 6, 2000	Kitt Peak	Spacewatch	KOR	3.3 km	MPC · JPL
71448	2000 AM_{241}	—	January 7, 2000	Socorro	LINEAR	·	4.0 km	MPC · JPL
71449	2000 AJ_{242}	—	January 7, 2000	Anderson Mesa	LONEOS	·	13 km	MPC · JPL
71450	2000 AV_{242}	—	January 7, 2000	Anderson Mesa	LONEOS	EOS	4.8 km	MPC · JPL
71451	2000 AD_{243}	—	January 7, 2000	Anderson Mesa	LONEOS	·	3.8 km	MPC · JPL
71452	2000 AQ_{243}	—	January 7, 2000	Socorro	LINEAR	TIR	5.2 km	MPC · JPL
71453	2000 AW_{244}	—	January 8, 2000	Socorro	LINEAR	·	3.6 km	MPC · JPL
71454	2000 AC_{245}	—	January 9, 2000	Socorro	LINEAR	MAR	3.7 km	MPC · JPL
71455	2000 AD_{245}	—	January 9, 2000	Socorro	LINEAR	·	3.0 km	MPC · JPL
71456	2000 AQ_{247}	—	January 2, 2000	Socorro	LINEAR	VER	6.2 km	MPC · JPL
71457	2000 AV_{247}	—	January 2, 2000	Socorro	LINEAR	·	6.3 km	MPC · JPL
71458	2000 BU	—	January 26, 2000	Farra d'Isonzo	Farra d'Isonzo	·	6.1 km	MPC · JPL
71459	2000 BJ_{2}	—	January 25, 2000	Socorro	LINEAR	·	3.1 km	MPC · JPL
71460	2000 BA_{3}	—	January 26, 2000	Višnjan Observatory	K. Korlević	·	6.6 km	MPC · JPL
71461 Chowmeeyee	2000 BA_{4}	Chowmeeyee	January 28, 2000	Rock Finder	W. K. Y. Yeung	·	4.9 km	MPC · JPL
71462	2000 BP_{4}	—	January 21, 2000	Socorro	LINEAR	EUN	3.9 km	MPC · JPL
71463	2000 BQ_{4}	—	January 21, 2000	Socorro	LINEAR	·	3.9 km	MPC · JPL
71464	2000 BB_{7}	—	January 27, 2000	Socorro	LINEAR	·	9.5 km	MPC · JPL
71465	2000 BX_{7}	—	January 29, 2000	Socorro	LINEAR	EOS	5.2 km	MPC · JPL
71466	2000 BB_{10}	—	January 26, 2000	Kitt Peak	Spacewatch	THM	5.0 km	MPC · JPL
71467	2000 BE_{13}	—	January 28, 2000	Kitt Peak	Spacewatch	·	4.0 km	MPC · JPL
71468	2000 BY_{13}	—	January 24, 2000	Rock Finder	W. K. Y. Yeung	EOS	4.0 km	MPC · JPL
71469	2000 BQ_{14}	—	January 28, 2000	Oizumi	T. Kobayashi	·	6.1 km	MPC · JPL
71470	2000 BV_{14}	—	January 31, 2000	Oizumi	T. Kobayashi	·	4.7 km	MPC · JPL
71471	2000 BN_{15}	—	January 27, 2000	Socorro	LINEAR	·	7.1 km	MPC · JPL
71472	2000 BO_{15}	—	January 27, 2000	Socorro	LINEAR	·	6.2 km	MPC · JPL
71473	2000 BG_{16}	—	January 30, 2000	Socorro	LINEAR	EUN	3.1 km	MPC · JPL
71474	2000 BY_{16}	—	January 30, 2000	Socorro	LINEAR	·	7.8 km	MPC · JPL
71475	2000 BF_{17}	—	January 30, 2000	Socorro	LINEAR	·	5.0 km	MPC · JPL
71476	2000 BG_{17}	—	January 30, 2000	Socorro	LINEAR	·	5.0 km	MPC · JPL
71477	2000 BD_{24}	—	January 29, 2000	Socorro	LINEAR	·	9.3 km	MPC · JPL
71478	2000 BN_{24}	—	January 29, 2000	Socorro	LINEAR	EOS	4.5 km	MPC · JPL
71479	2000 BL_{26}	—	January 30, 2000	Socorro	LINEAR	THM	5.5 km	MPC · JPL
71480 Roberthatt	2000 BZ_{28}	Roberthatt	January 30, 2000	Catalina	CSS	·	7.3 km	MPC · JPL
71481	2000 BY_{29}	—	January 30, 2000	Socorro	LINEAR	·	4.7 km	MPC · JPL
71482 Jennamarie	2000 BO_{30}	Jennamarie	January 28, 2000	Kitt Peak	Spacewatch	·	8.4 km	MPC · JPL
71483 Dickgottfried	2000 BU_{33}	Dickgottfried	January 30, 2000	Catalina	CSS	·	4.4 km	MPC · JPL
71484	2000 BE_{34}	—	January 30, 2000	Kitt Peak	Spacewatch	EOS	5.3 km	MPC · JPL
71485 Brettman	2000 BM_{34}	Brettman	January 30, 2000	Catalina	CSS	·	4.7 km	MPC · JPL
71486	2000 BE_{38}	—	January 28, 2000	Kitt Peak	Spacewatch	·	4.4 km	MPC · JPL
71487	2000 BE_{46}	—	January 28, 2000	Kitt Peak	Spacewatch	·	6.1 km	MPC · JPL
71488	2000 BR_{49}	—	January 21, 2000	Socorro	LINEAR	MAR	3.8 km	MPC · JPL
71489 Dynamocamp	2000 CT_{1}	Dynamocamp	February 4, 2000	San Marcello	L. Tesi, M. Tombelli	THM	8.1 km	MPC · JPL
71490	2000 CY_{7}	—	February 2, 2000	Socorro	LINEAR	EOS	4.7 km	MPC · JPL
71491	2000 CO_{10}	—	February 2, 2000	Socorro	LINEAR	EOS	6.1 km	MPC · JPL
71492	2000 CQ_{12}	—	February 2, 2000	Socorro	LINEAR	·	5.0 km	MPC · JPL
71493	2000 CF_{13}	—	February 2, 2000	Socorro	LINEAR	·	4.2 km	MPC · JPL
71494	2000 CH_{14}	—	February 2, 2000	Socorro	LINEAR	GEF · slow	4.6 km	MPC · JPL
71495	2000 CL_{14}	—	February 2, 2000	Socorro	LINEAR	·	5.6 km	MPC · JPL
71496	2000 CB_{18}	—	February 2, 2000	Socorro	LINEAR	·	5.5 km	MPC · JPL
71497	2000 CL_{18}	—	February 2, 2000	Socorro	LINEAR	HYG	9.0 km	MPC · JPL
71498	2000 CH_{20}	—	February 2, 2000	Socorro	LINEAR	EOS	5.9 km	MPC · JPL
71499	2000 CV_{20}	—	February 2, 2000	Socorro	LINEAR	KOR	2.8 km	MPC · JPL
71500	2000 CM_{23}	—	February 2, 2000	Socorro	LINEAR	·	6.0 km	MPC · JPL

== 71501–71600 ==
back to top

Designation			Discovery			Properties		Ref
Permanent	Provisional	Named after	Date	Site	Discoverer(s)	Category	Diam.	Ref
71501	2000 CQ_{23}	—	February 2, 2000	Socorro	LINEAR	·	8.5 km	MPC · JPL
71502	2000 CT_{25}	—	February 2, 2000	Socorro	LINEAR	·	7.3 km	MPC · JPL
71503	2000 CR_{26}	—	February 2, 2000	Socorro	LINEAR	·	6.0 km	MPC · JPL
71504	2000 CT_{28}	—	February 2, 2000	Socorro	LINEAR	·	7.1 km	MPC · JPL
71505	2000 CD_{30}	—	February 2, 2000	Socorro	LINEAR	HYG	8.8 km	MPC · JPL
71506	2000 CS_{30}	—	February 2, 2000	Socorro	LINEAR	·	7.7 km	MPC · JPL
71507	2000 CP_{34}	—	February 4, 2000	Ondřejov	P. Kušnirák	·	3.3 km	MPC · JPL
71508	2000 CL_{35}	—	February 2, 2000	Socorro	LINEAR	CYB	8.3 km	MPC · JPL
71509	2000 CT_{37}	—	February 3, 2000	Socorro	LINEAR	·	7.8 km	MPC · JPL
71510	2000 CW_{49}	—	February 2, 2000	Socorro	LINEAR	·	3.5 km	MPC · JPL
71511	2000 CF_{51}	—	February 2, 2000	Socorro	LINEAR	·	13 km	MPC · JPL
71512	2000 CL_{51}	—	February 2, 2000	Socorro	LINEAR	DOR	7.1 km	MPC · JPL
71513	2000 CD_{55}	—	February 3, 2000	Socorro	LINEAR	EOS	4.3 km	MPC · JPL
71514	2000 CG_{55}	—	February 3, 2000	Socorro	LINEAR	·	7.9 km	MPC · JPL
71515	2000 CL_{55}	—	February 4, 2000	Socorro	LINEAR	·	4.8 km	MPC · JPL
71516	2000 CT_{56}	—	February 4, 2000	Socorro	LINEAR	·	5.3 km	MPC · JPL
71517	2000 CO_{59}	—	February 2, 2000	Socorro	LINEAR	·	7.5 km	MPC · JPL
71518	2000 CP_{62}	—	February 2, 2000	Socorro	LINEAR	·	5.1 km	MPC · JPL
71519	2000 CB_{63}	—	February 2, 2000	Socorro	LINEAR	·	4.8 km	MPC · JPL
71520	2000 CE_{69}	—	February 1, 2000	Kitt Peak	Spacewatch	·	9.1 km	MPC · JPL
71521	2000 CT_{70}	—	February 7, 2000	Socorro	LINEAR	·	5.4 km	MPC · JPL
71522	2000 CV_{72}	—	February 2, 2000	Socorro	LINEAR	EOS	4.3 km	MPC · JPL
71523	2000 CO_{76}	—	February 10, 2000	Višnjan Observatory	K. Korlević	EOS	4.6 km	MPC · JPL
71524	2000 CM_{78}	—	February 7, 2000	Kitt Peak	Spacewatch	THM	8.2 km	MPC · JPL
71525	2000 CL_{79}	—	February 8, 2000	Kitt Peak	Spacewatch	·	4.4 km	MPC · JPL
71526	2000 CO_{81}	—	February 4, 2000	Socorro	LINEAR	·	7.0 km	MPC · JPL
71527	2000 CD_{82}	—	February 4, 2000	Socorro	LINEAR	THM	6.8 km	MPC · JPL
71528	2000 CY_{84}	—	February 4, 2000	Socorro	LINEAR	·	6.3 km	MPC · JPL
71529	2000 CZ_{84}	—	February 4, 2000	Socorro	LINEAR	HYG	6.1 km	MPC · JPL
71530	2000 CQ_{87}	—	February 4, 2000	Socorro	LINEAR	·	3.5 km	MPC · JPL
71531	2000 CL_{89}	—	February 4, 2000	Socorro	LINEAR	·	6.7 km	MPC · JPL
71532	2000 CB_{91}	—	February 6, 2000	Socorro	LINEAR	THM	8.7 km	MPC · JPL
71533	2000 CL_{91}	—	February 6, 2000	Socorro	LINEAR	·	8.2 km	MPC · JPL
71534	2000 CU_{92}	—	February 6, 2000	Socorro	LINEAR	·	11 km	MPC · JPL
71535	2000 CY_{93}	—	February 8, 2000	Socorro	LINEAR	·	6.4 km	MPC · JPL
71536	2000 CF_{94}	—	February 8, 2000	Socorro	LINEAR	·	4.9 km	MPC · JPL
71537	2000 CE_{99}	—	February 8, 2000	Kitt Peak	Spacewatch	·	5.3 km	MPC · JPL
71538 Robertfried	2000 CB_{107}	Robertfried	February 5, 2000	Catalina	CSS	EUN	3.1 km	MPC · JPL
71539 VanZandt	2000 CG_{112}	VanZandt	February 7, 2000	Catalina	CSS	·	4.3 km	MPC · JPL
71540	2000 CN_{113}	—	February 10, 2000	Kitt Peak	Spacewatch	·	7.2 km	MPC · JPL
71541	2000 CK_{115}	—	February 3, 2000	Socorro	LINEAR	·	5.4 km	MPC · JPL
71542	2000 CR_{116}	—	February 3, 2000	Socorro	LINEAR	EOS	6.9 km	MPC · JPL
71543	2000 CM_{120}	—	February 2, 2000	Socorro	LINEAR	·	9.2 km	MPC · JPL
71544	2000 CD_{123}	—	February 3, 2000	Socorro	LINEAR	·	3.8 km	MPC · JPL
71545	2000 CK_{124}	—	February 3, 2000	Socorro	LINEAR	EOS	4.4 km	MPC · JPL
71546	2000 DK_{2}	—	February 24, 2000	Višnjan Observatory	K. Korlević, M. Jurić	THM	6.0 km	MPC · JPL
71547	2000 DB_{3}	—	February 27, 2000	Oizumi	T. Kobayashi	ELF	13 km	MPC · JPL
71548	2000 DY_{3}	—	February 28, 2000	Socorro	LINEAR	·	11 km	MPC · JPL
71549	2000 DF_{6}	—	February 28, 2000	Socorro	LINEAR	·	5.7 km	MPC · JPL
71550	2000 DG_{6}	—	February 28, 2000	Socorro	LINEAR	·	7.3 km	MPC · JPL
71551	2000 DW_{6}	—	February 27, 2000	Tebbutt	F. B. Zoltowski	·	4.2 km	MPC · JPL
71552	2000 DR_{7}	—	February 28, 2000	Kitt Peak	Spacewatch	THM	6.1 km	MPC · JPL
71553	2000 DD_{8}	—	February 28, 2000	Kitt Peak	Spacewatch	THM	5.4 km	MPC · JPL
71554	2000 DV_{11}	—	February 27, 2000	Kitt Peak	Spacewatch	·	2.6 km	MPC · JPL
71555 Manuecharpentier	2000 DY_{15}	Manuecharpentier	February 27, 2000	Catalina	CSS	(3460)	8.3 km	MPC · JPL
71556 Page	2000 DW_{17}	Page	February 27, 2000	Jornada	Dixon, D. S.	EOS	4.2 km	MPC · JPL
71557	2000 DZ_{19}	—	February 29, 2000	Socorro	LINEAR	·	4.4 km	MPC · JPL
71558	2000 DH_{21}	—	February 29, 2000	Socorro	LINEAR	·	8.6 km	MPC · JPL
71559	2000 DU_{22}	—	February 29, 2000	Socorro	LINEAR	·	6.3 km	MPC · JPL
71560	2000 DU_{23}	—	February 29, 2000	Socorro	LINEAR	·	7.1 km	MPC · JPL
71561	2000 DU_{25}	—	February 29, 2000	Socorro	LINEAR	THM	4.7 km	MPC · JPL
71562	2000 DV_{25}	—	February 29, 2000	Socorro	LINEAR	·	3.2 km	MPC · JPL
71563	2000 DT_{26}	—	February 29, 2000	Socorro	LINEAR	·	5.6 km	MPC · JPL
71564	2000 DG_{28}	—	February 29, 2000	Socorro	LINEAR	THM	6.9 km	MPC · JPL
71565	2000 DB_{29}	—	February 29, 2000	Socorro	LINEAR	EOS	4.6 km	MPC · JPL
71566	2000 DU_{34}	—	February 29, 2000	Socorro	LINEAR	·	7.3 km	MPC · JPL
71567	2000 DV_{34}	—	February 29, 2000	Socorro	LINEAR	EOS	4.7 km	MPC · JPL
71568	2000 DS_{39}	—	February 29, 2000	Socorro	LINEAR	HYG	7.0 km	MPC · JPL
71569	2000 DG_{40}	—	February 29, 2000	Socorro	LINEAR	·	2.1 km	MPC · JPL
71570	2000 DR_{40}	—	February 29, 2000	Socorro	LINEAR	EOS	4.7 km	MPC · JPL
71571	2000 DM_{42}	—	February 29, 2000	Socorro	LINEAR	·	5.1 km	MPC · JPL
71572	2000 DW_{42}	—	February 29, 2000	Socorro	LINEAR	·	10 km	MPC · JPL
71573	2000 DO_{43}	—	February 29, 2000	Socorro	LINEAR	·	6.2 km	MPC · JPL
71574	2000 DJ_{49}	—	February 29, 2000	Socorro	LINEAR	·	9.1 km	MPC · JPL
71575	2000 DC_{50}	—	February 29, 2000	Socorro	LINEAR	THM	6.6 km	MPC · JPL
71576	2000 DH_{53}	—	February 29, 2000	Socorro	LINEAR	·	9.9 km	MPC · JPL
71577	2000 DU_{55}	—	February 29, 2000	Socorro	LINEAR	THM	7.0 km	MPC · JPL
71578	2000 DO_{57}	—	February 29, 2000	Socorro	LINEAR	·	4.6 km	MPC · JPL
71579	2000 DO_{58}	—	February 29, 2000	Socorro	LINEAR	EOS	4.4 km	MPC · JPL
71580	2000 DH_{59}	—	February 29, 2000	Socorro	LINEAR	EOS	4.0 km	MPC · JPL
71581	2000 DG_{60}	—	February 29, 2000	Socorro	LINEAR	·	4.6 km	MPC · JPL
71582	2000 DD_{61}	—	February 29, 2000	Socorro	LINEAR	HYG	8.8 km	MPC · JPL
71583	2000 DW_{61}	—	February 29, 2000	Socorro	LINEAR	·	5.9 km	MPC · JPL
71584	2000 DD_{62}	—	February 29, 2000	Socorro	LINEAR	THM	5.7 km	MPC · JPL
71585	2000 DS_{64}	—	February 29, 2000	Socorro	LINEAR	·	6.3 km	MPC · JPL
71586	2000 DV_{66}	—	February 29, 2000	Socorro	LINEAR	THM	5.8 km	MPC · JPL
71587	2000 DX_{66}	—	February 29, 2000	Socorro	LINEAR	·	4.0 km	MPC · JPL
71588	2000 DK_{68}	—	February 29, 2000	Socorro	LINEAR	HYG	6.3 km	MPC · JPL
71589	2000 DF_{69}	—	February 29, 2000	Socorro	LINEAR	·	6.9 km	MPC · JPL
71590	2000 DN_{71}	—	February 29, 2000	Socorro	LINEAR	·	6.7 km	MPC · JPL
71591	2000 DP_{71}	—	February 29, 2000	Socorro	LINEAR	·	8.6 km	MPC · JPL
71592	2000 DM_{76}	—	February 29, 2000	Socorro	LINEAR	·	7.1 km	MPC · JPL
71593	2000 DP_{77}	—	February 29, 2000	Socorro	LINEAR	THM	5.6 km	MPC · JPL
71594	2000 DT_{77}	—	February 29, 2000	Socorro	LINEAR	·	9.9 km	MPC · JPL
71595	2000 DW_{77}	—	February 29, 2000	Socorro	LINEAR	HYG	7.0 km	MPC · JPL
71596	2000 DG_{80}	—	February 28, 2000	Socorro	LINEAR	slow	9.1 km	MPC · JPL
71597	2000 DD_{83}	—	February 28, 2000	Socorro	LINEAR	EOS	4.1 km	MPC · JPL
71598	2000 DG_{84}	—	February 28, 2000	Socorro	LINEAR	·	6.2 km	MPC · JPL
71599	2000 DP_{84}	—	February 29, 2000	Socorro	LINEAR	·	4.6 km	MPC · JPL
71600	2000 DK_{87}	—	February 29, 2000	Socorro	LINEAR	HYG	6.7 km	MPC · JPL

== 71601–71700 ==
back to top

Designation			Discovery			Properties		Ref
Permanent	Provisional	Named after	Date	Site	Discoverer(s)	Category	Diam.	Ref
71601	2000 DJ_{93}	—	February 28, 2000	Socorro	LINEAR	EOS	6.7 km	MPC · JPL
71602	2000 DO_{95}	—	February 28, 2000	Socorro	LINEAR	·	6.2 km	MPC · JPL
71603	2000 DU_{98}	—	February 29, 2000	Socorro	LINEAR	·	8.1 km	MPC · JPL
71604	2000 DZ_{99}	—	February 29, 2000	Socorro	LINEAR	EOS	4.3 km	MPC · JPL
71605	2000 DJ_{101}	—	February 29, 2000	Socorro	LINEAR	·	3.6 km	MPC · JPL
71606	2000 DY_{101}	—	February 29, 2000	Socorro	LINEAR	·	8.1 km	MPC · JPL
71607	2000 DO_{102}	—	February 29, 2000	Socorro	LINEAR	·	8.2 km	MPC · JPL
71608	2000 DN_{105}	—	February 29, 2000	Socorro	LINEAR	HYG	7.0 km	MPC · JPL
71609	2000 DH_{106}	—	February 29, 2000	Socorro	LINEAR	HYG	6.3 km	MPC · JPL
71610	2000 DT_{107}	—	February 28, 2000	Socorro	LINEAR	·	6.6 km	MPC · JPL
71611	2000 EA_{7}	—	March 2, 2000	Kitt Peak	Spacewatch	·	6.7 km	MPC · JPL
71612	2000 EH_{12}	—	March 4, 2000	Socorro	LINEAR	THB	7.9 km	MPC · JPL
71613	2000 ET_{12}	—	March 4, 2000	Socorro	LINEAR	·	7.5 km	MPC · JPL
71614	2000 EF_{18}	—	March 4, 2000	Socorro	LINEAR	·	4.4 km	MPC · JPL
71615 Ramakers	2000 EM_{20}	Ramakers	March 3, 2000	Catalina	CSS	·	6.1 km	MPC · JPL
71616	2000 EG_{28}	—	March 4, 2000	Socorro	LINEAR	·	8.0 km	MPC · JPL
71617	2000 EM_{28}	—	March 4, 2000	Socorro	LINEAR	EOS	6.4 km	MPC · JPL
71618	2000 EO_{28}	—	March 4, 2000	Socorro	LINEAR	·	6.1 km	MPC · JPL
71619	2000 ES_{35}	—	March 8, 2000	Socorro	LINEAR	·	8.5 km	MPC · JPL
71620	2000 EE_{40}	—	March 8, 2000	Socorro	LINEAR	HYG	7.6 km	MPC · JPL
71621	2000 EC_{47}	—	March 9, 2000	Socorro	LINEAR	·	6.3 km	MPC · JPL
71622	2000 EZ_{47}	—	March 9, 2000	Socorro	LINEAR	·	4.4 km	MPC · JPL
71623	2000 ET_{53}	—	March 9, 2000	Kitt Peak	Spacewatch	THM	5.0 km	MPC · JPL
71624	2000 EK_{57}	—	March 8, 2000	Socorro	LINEAR	EOS	4.4 km	MPC · JPL
71625	2000 EM_{63}	—	March 10, 2000	Socorro	LINEAR	·	6.3 km	MPC · JPL
71626	2000 ER_{66}	—	March 10, 2000	Socorro	LINEAR	KOR	4.4 km	MPC · JPL
71627	2000 EY_{66}	—	March 10, 2000	Socorro	LINEAR	CYB	7.7 km	MPC · JPL
71628	2000 EJ_{69}	—	March 10, 2000	Socorro	LINEAR	HYG	6.4 km	MPC · JPL
71629	2000 EH_{70}	—	March 10, 2000	Socorro	LINEAR	HYG	6.9 km	MPC · JPL
71630	2000 EN_{75}	—	March 6, 2000	Reedy Creek	J. Broughton	·	4.5 km	MPC · JPL
71631	2000 EX_{75}	—	March 5, 2000	Socorro	LINEAR	·	6.2 km	MPC · JPL
71632	2000 ER_{76}	—	March 5, 2000	Socorro	LINEAR	EOS	6.0 km	MPC · JPL
71633	2000 EK_{77}	—	March 5, 2000	Socorro	LINEAR	EOS	3.9 km	MPC · JPL
71634	2000 EK_{80}	—	March 5, 2000	Socorro	LINEAR	HYG	8.0 km	MPC · JPL
71635	2000 EA_{83}	—	March 5, 2000	Socorro	LINEAR	VER	6.8 km	MPC · JPL
71636	2000 EF_{83}	—	March 5, 2000	Socorro	LINEAR	EOS	4.5 km	MPC · JPL
71637	2000 ER_{83}	—	March 5, 2000	Socorro	LINEAR	·	7.2 km	MPC · JPL
71638	2000 EL_{90}	—	March 9, 2000	Socorro	LINEAR	EUP	12 km	MPC · JPL
71639	2000 EC_{92}	—	March 9, 2000	Socorro	LINEAR	·	5.7 km	MPC · JPL
71640	2000 EF_{94}	—	March 9, 2000	Socorro	LINEAR	EMA	7.5 km	MPC · JPL
71641	2000 ER_{96}	—	March 12, 2000	Socorro	LINEAR	·	5.9 km	MPC · JPL
71642	2000 EG_{103}	—	March 11, 2000	Socorro	LINEAR	·	7.1 km	MPC · JPL
71643	2000 EJ_{103}	—	March 12, 2000	Socorro	LINEAR	·	4.7 km	MPC · JPL
71644	2000 EF_{105}	—	March 11, 2000	Anderson Mesa	LONEOS	·	6.0 km	MPC · JPL
71645	2000 EX_{109}	—	March 8, 2000	Haleakala	NEAT	EOS	5.5 km	MPC · JPL
71646	2000 EO_{110}	—	March 8, 2000	Haleakala	NEAT	·	8.2 km	MPC · JPL
71647	2000 EW_{110}	—	March 8, 2000	Haleakala	NEAT	·	6.3 km	MPC · JPL
71648	2000 EC_{112}	—	March 9, 2000	Socorro	LINEAR	·	6.1 km	MPC · JPL
71649	2000 EL_{112}	—	March 9, 2000	Socorro	LINEAR	HYG	6.0 km	MPC · JPL
71650	2000 ER_{113}	—	March 9, 2000	Kitt Peak	Spacewatch	·	5.4 km	MPC · JPL
71651	2000 EC_{118}	—	March 11, 2000	Anderson Mesa	LONEOS	·	8.4 km	MPC · JPL
71652	2000 EH_{118}	—	March 11, 2000	Anderson Mesa	LONEOS	EOS	5.0 km	MPC · JPL
71653	2000 EQ_{118}	—	March 11, 2000	Anderson Mesa	LONEOS	EOS	6.1 km	MPC · JPL
71654	2000 EY_{119}	—	March 11, 2000	Anderson Mesa	LONEOS	·	3.1 km	MPC · JPL
71655	2000 EF_{121}	—	March 11, 2000	Anderson Mesa	LONEOS	LIX	13 km	MPC · JPL
71656	2000 ET_{121}	—	March 11, 2000	Catalina	CSS	EOS	5.9 km	MPC · JPL
71657	2000 EP_{122}	—	March 11, 2000	Anderson Mesa	LONEOS	·	1.8 km	MPC · JPL
71658	2000 EQ_{122}	—	March 11, 2000	Anderson Mesa	LONEOS	·	7.5 km	MPC · JPL
71659	2000 EC_{128}	—	March 11, 2000	Anderson Mesa	LONEOS	·	5.7 km	MPC · JPL
71660	2000 EJ_{130}	—	March 11, 2000	Anderson Mesa	LONEOS	·	9.1 km	MPC · JPL
71661	2000 EP_{130}	—	March 11, 2000	Anderson Mesa	LONEOS	·	7.2 km	MPC · JPL
71662	2000 EV_{132}	—	March 11, 2000	Socorro	LINEAR	·	6.1 km	MPC · JPL
71663	2000 EY_{138}	—	March 11, 2000	Catalina	CSS	·	7.2 km	MPC · JPL
71664	2000 EE_{139}	—	March 11, 2000	Catalina	CSS	·	10 km	MPC · JPL
71665	2000 EB_{143}	—	March 3, 2000	Catalina	CSS	·	11 km	MPC · JPL
71666	2000 EK_{148}	—	March 4, 2000	Catalina	CSS	EOS	12 km	MPC · JPL
71667	2000 EP_{150}	—	March 5, 2000	Haleakala	NEAT	THM	7.2 km	MPC · JPL
71668	2000 EA_{152}	—	March 6, 2000	Haleakala	NEAT	·	8.9 km	MPC · JPL
71669 Dodsonprince	2000 EH_{157}	Dodsonprince	March 11, 2000	Catalina	CSS	·	9.2 km	MPC · JPL
71670	2000 EP_{157}	—	March 12, 2000	Anderson Mesa	LONEOS	JUN	3.2 km	MPC · JPL
71671	2000 EM_{166}	—	March 4, 2000	Socorro	LINEAR	EOS	6.4 km	MPC · JPL
71672	2000 ER_{166}	—	March 4, 2000	Socorro	LINEAR	·	4.3 km	MPC · JPL
71673	2000 EZ_{166}	—	March 4, 2000	Socorro	LINEAR	EOS	6.1 km	MPC · JPL
71674	2000 EJ_{167}	—	March 4, 2000	Socorro	LINEAR	(21885)	7.3 km	MPC · JPL
71675	2000 ER_{167}	—	March 4, 2000	Socorro	LINEAR	NAE	7.7 km	MPC · JPL
71676	2000 EM_{168}	—	March 4, 2000	Socorro	LINEAR	TIR	3.6 km	MPC · JPL
71677	2000 EJ_{171}	—	March 5, 2000	Socorro	LINEAR	·	7.5 km	MPC · JPL
71678	2000 ET_{172}	—	March 1, 2000	Kitt Peak	Spacewatch	·	2.9 km	MPC · JPL
71679	2000 EY_{181}	—	March 4, 2000	Socorro	LINEAR	EOS	4.9 km	MPC · JPL
71680	2000 EJ_{201}	—	March 15, 2000	Socorro	LINEAR	slow	7.4 km	MPC · JPL
71681	2000 FZ_{1}	—	March 25, 2000	Kitt Peak	Spacewatch	THM	7.7 km	MPC · JPL
71682	2000 FU_{11}	—	March 28, 2000	Socorro	LINEAR	·	4.3 km	MPC · JPL
71683	2000 FE_{12}	—	March 28, 2000	Socorro	LINEAR	·	6.6 km	MPC · JPL
71684	2000 FY_{15}	—	March 28, 2000	Socorro	LINEAR	HYG	7.1 km	MPC · JPL
71685	2000 FX_{21}	—	March 29, 2000	Socorro	LINEAR	·	7.5 km	MPC · JPL
71686	2000 FU_{30}	—	March 27, 2000	Anderson Mesa	LONEOS	HYG	7.0 km	MPC · JPL
71687	2000 FY_{31}	—	March 29, 2000	Socorro	LINEAR	·	4.9 km	MPC · JPL
71688	2000 FX_{32}	—	March 29, 2000	Socorro	LINEAR	(1101)	9.3 km	MPC · JPL
71689	2000 FD_{34}	—	March 29, 2000	Socorro	LINEAR	·	10 km	MPC · JPL
71690	2000 FO_{35}	—	March 29, 2000	Socorro	LINEAR	·	4.2 km	MPC · JPL
71691	2000 FH_{37}	—	March 29, 2000	Socorro	LINEAR	·	13 km	MPC · JPL
71692	2000 FB_{43}	—	March 28, 2000	Socorro	LINEAR	·	3.9 km	MPC · JPL
71693	2000 FK_{43}	—	March 29, 2000	Socorro	LINEAR	URS	9.9 km	MPC · JPL
71694	2000 FN_{44}	—	March 29, 2000	Socorro	LINEAR	2:1J	7.7 km	MPC · JPL
71695	2000 FO_{44}	—	March 29, 2000	Socorro	LINEAR	HYG	8.5 km	MPC · JPL
71696	2000 FE_{48}	—	March 29, 2000	Socorro	LINEAR	·	6.2 km	MPC · JPL
71697	2000 FO_{55}	—	March 29, 2000	Socorro	LINEAR	·	2.3 km	MPC · JPL
71698	2000 FW_{55}	—	March 27, 2000	Anderson Mesa	LONEOS	·	8.5 km	MPC · JPL
71699	2000 GU_{17}	—	April 5, 2000	Socorro	LINEAR	·	5.0 km	MPC · JPL
71700	2000 GO_{19}	—	April 5, 2000	Socorro	LINEAR	·	3.6 km	MPC · JPL

== 71701–71800 ==
back to top

Designation			Discovery			Properties		Ref
Permanent	Provisional	Named after	Date	Site	Discoverer(s)	Category	Diam.	Ref
71701	2000 GR_{19}	—	April 5, 2000	Socorro	LINEAR	3:2	9.7 km	MPC · JPL
71702	2000 GT_{19}	—	April 5, 2000	Socorro	LINEAR	·	7.8 km	MPC · JPL
71703	2000 GW_{22}	—	April 5, 2000	Socorro	LINEAR	EOS	4.9 km	MPC · JPL
71704	2000 GL_{34}	—	April 5, 2000	Socorro	LINEAR	THM	7.5 km	MPC · JPL
71705	2000 GV_{34}	—	April 5, 2000	Socorro	LINEAR	HYG	6.2 km	MPC · JPL
71706	2000 GY_{38}	—	April 5, 2000	Socorro	LINEAR	·	5.0 km	MPC · JPL
71707	2000 GZ_{56}	—	April 5, 2000	Socorro	LINEAR	THM	6.6 km	MPC · JPL
71708	2000 GT_{77}	—	April 5, 2000	Socorro	LINEAR	·	4.7 km	MPC · JPL
71709	2000 GX_{80}	—	April 6, 2000	Socorro	LINEAR	·	7.6 km	MPC · JPL
71710	2000 GG_{83}	—	April 2, 2000	Socorro	LINEAR	·	4.4 km	MPC · JPL
71711	2000 GU_{83}	—	April 3, 2000	Socorro	LINEAR	·	6.4 km	MPC · JPL
71712	2000 GK_{95}	—	April 6, 2000	Socorro	LINEAR	·	3.7 km	MPC · JPL
71713	2000 GN_{98}	—	April 7, 2000	Socorro	LINEAR	CYB	9.6 km	MPC · JPL
71714	2000 GZ_{100}	—	April 7, 2000	Socorro	LINEAR	V	1.6 km	MPC · JPL
71715	2000 GE_{108}	—	April 7, 2000	Socorro	LINEAR	·	11 km	MPC · JPL
71716	2000 GX_{112}	—	April 5, 2000	Socorro	LINEAR	THM	7.7 km	MPC · JPL
71717	2000 GP_{115}	—	April 8, 2000	Socorro	LINEAR	THM	8.6 km	MPC · JPL
71718	2000 GV_{124}	—	April 7, 2000	Socorro	LINEAR	TIR	5.3 km	MPC · JPL
71719	2000 GT_{137}	—	April 4, 2000	Anderson Mesa	LONEOS	·	5.4 km	MPC · JPL
71720	2000 GK_{167}	—	April 4, 2000	Anderson Mesa	LONEOS	·	4.0 km	MPC · JPL
71721	2000 GL_{167}	—	April 4, 2000	Anderson Mesa	LONEOS	·	4.7 km	MPC · JPL
71722	2000 GB_{169}	—	April 4, 2000	Socorro	LINEAR	·	8.4 km	MPC · JPL
71723	2000 GS_{171}	—	April 2, 2000	Anderson Mesa	LONEOS	·	5.7 km	MPC · JPL
71724	2000 GB_{186}	—	April 4, 2000	Anderson Mesa	LONEOS	SYL · CYB	7.8 km	MPC · JPL
71725	2000 HN_{9}	—	April 27, 2000	Socorro	LINEAR	THM	6.8 km	MPC · JPL
71726	2000 HQ_{24}	—	April 24, 2000	Anderson Mesa	LONEOS	·	9.7 km	MPC · JPL
71727	2000 HB_{25}	—	April 24, 2000	Anderson Mesa	LONEOS	slow	16 km	MPC · JPL
71728	2000 HE_{64}	—	April 26, 2000	Anderson Mesa	LONEOS	·	4.7 km	MPC · JPL
71729	2000 HQ_{91}	—	April 30, 2000	Anderson Mesa	LONEOS	TIR · slow	4.7 km	MPC · JPL
71730	2000 JY_{3}	—	May 4, 2000	Socorro	LINEAR	H	1.1 km	MPC · JPL
71731	2000 JO_{35}	—	May 7, 2000	Socorro	LINEAR	(3460)	11 km	MPC · JPL
71732	2000 JU_{37}	—	May 7, 2000	Socorro	LINEAR	·	2.7 km	MPC · JPL
71733	2000 JQ_{47}	—	May 9, 2000	Socorro	LINEAR	·	10 km	MPC · JPL
71734	2000 LX_{9}	—	June 4, 2000	Socorro	LINEAR	H	1.6 km	MPC · JPL
71735	2000 MJ_{1}	—	June 25, 2000	Socorro	LINEAR	H	1.5 km	MPC · JPL
71736	2000 OB_{54}	—	July 29, 2000	Anderson Mesa	LONEOS	H	1.2 km	MPC · JPL
71737	2000 PV_{6}	—	August 4, 2000	Socorro	LINEAR	H	1.6 km	MPC · JPL
71738	2000 PW_{18}	—	August 1, 2000	Socorro	LINEAR	·	5.7 km	MPC · JPL
71739	2000 QG_{25}	—	August 24, 2000	Socorro	LINEAR	H	1.3 km	MPC · JPL
71740	2000 QV_{25}	—	August 26, 2000	Socorro	LINEAR	H	1.3 km	MPC · JPL
71741	2000 QF_{34}	—	August 26, 2000	Socorro	LINEAR	H	1.5 km	MPC · JPL
71742	2000 QU_{35}	—	August 24, 2000	Socorro	LINEAR	H	1.0 km	MPC · JPL
71743	2000 QO_{117}	—	August 29, 2000	Socorro	LINEAR	H	1.5 km	MPC · JPL
71744	2000 QP_{147}	—	August 31, 2000	Socorro	LINEAR	H	1.0 km	MPC · JPL
71745	2000 QG_{180}	—	August 31, 2000	Socorro	LINEAR	H	1.4 km	MPC · JPL
71746	2000 QZ_{180}	—	August 31, 2000	Socorro	LINEAR	·	2.4 km	MPC · JPL
71747	2000 QU_{181}	—	August 31, 2000	Socorro	LINEAR	·	1.6 km	MPC · JPL
71748	2000 QD_{182}	—	August 26, 2000	Socorro	LINEAR	·	3.0 km	MPC · JPL
71749	2000 QU_{194}	—	August 25, 2000	Socorro	LINEAR	·	3.3 km	MPC · JPL
71750	2000 RV_{3}	—	September 1, 2000	Socorro	LINEAR	·	1.6 km	MPC · JPL
71751	2000 RS_{10}	—	September 1, 2000	Socorro	LINEAR	V	2.4 km	MPC · JPL
71752	2000 RL_{11}	—	September 1, 2000	Socorro	LINEAR	·	2.0 km	MPC · JPL
71753	2000 RB_{39}	—	September 5, 2000	Socorro	LINEAR	·	2.6 km	MPC · JPL
71754	2000 RO_{45}	—	September 3, 2000	Socorro	LINEAR	·	3.3 km	MPC · JPL
71755	2000 RD_{51}	—	September 5, 2000	Socorro	LINEAR	·	2.5 km	MPC · JPL
71756	2000 RQ_{51}	—	September 5, 2000	Socorro	LINEAR	·	2.7 km	MPC · JPL
71757	2000 RA_{53}	—	September 4, 2000	Socorro	LINEAR	·	1.9 km	MPC · JPL
71758	2000 RR_{54}	—	September 3, 2000	Socorro	LINEAR	·	5.7 km	MPC · JPL
71759	2000 RE_{61}	—	September 1, 2000	Socorro	LINEAR	·	2.7 km	MPC · JPL
71760	2000 RQ_{67}	—	September 1, 2000	Socorro	LINEAR	V	2.1 km	MPC · JPL
71761	2000 RJ_{100}	—	September 5, 2000	Anderson Mesa	LONEOS	H	1.3 km	MPC · JPL
71762	2000 RZ_{103}	—	September 6, 2000	Socorro	LINEAR	·	1.9 km	MPC · JPL
71763	2000 SF_{3}	—	September 20, 2000	Socorro	LINEAR	H	1.3 km	MPC · JPL
71764	2000 SG_{3}	—	September 20, 2000	Socorro	LINEAR	H	1.4 km	MPC · JPL
71765	2000 SU_{4}	—	September 20, 2000	Socorro	LINEAR	H	1.7 km	MPC · JPL
71766	2000 SD_{22}	—	September 19, 2000	Haleakala	NEAT	·	5.8 km	MPC · JPL
71767	2000 SM_{24}	—	September 26, 2000	Socorro	LINEAR	H	1.8 km	MPC · JPL
71768	2000 SM_{59}	—	September 24, 2000	Socorro	LINEAR	·	2.3 km	MPC · JPL
71769	2000 SU_{59}	—	September 24, 2000	Socorro	LINEAR	·	1.3 km	MPC · JPL
71770	2000 SL_{75}	—	September 24, 2000	Socorro	LINEAR	·	2.1 km	MPC · JPL
71771	2000 SR_{75}	—	September 24, 2000	Socorro	LINEAR	·	1.4 km	MPC · JPL
71772	2000 SG_{105}	—	September 24, 2000	Socorro	LINEAR	·	2.0 km	MPC · JPL
71773	2000 SO_{106}	—	September 24, 2000	Socorro	LINEAR	·	3.3 km	MPC · JPL
71774	2000 SA_{121}	—	September 24, 2000	Socorro	LINEAR	·	1.4 km	MPC · JPL
71775	2000 SB_{122}	—	September 24, 2000	Socorro	LINEAR	·	1.1 km	MPC · JPL
71776	2000 SJ_{123}	—	September 24, 2000	Socorro	LINEAR	·	1.9 km	MPC · JPL
71777	2000 SM_{128}	—	September 24, 2000	Socorro	LINEAR	(2076)	2.5 km	MPC · JPL
71778	2000 SP_{128}	—	September 24, 2000	Socorro	LINEAR	·	1.5 km	MPC · JPL
71779	2000 SJ_{129}	—	September 26, 2000	Socorro	LINEAR	H	1.2 km	MPC · JPL
71780	2000 SM_{145}	—	September 24, 2000	Socorro	LINEAR	·	1.3 km	MPC · JPL
71781	2000 SZ_{145}	—	September 24, 2000	Socorro	LINEAR	·	1.7 km	MPC · JPL
71782	2000 SC_{160}	—	September 22, 2000	Socorro	LINEAR	PHO	1.9 km	MPC · JPL
71783 Izeryna	2000 SL_{163}	Izeryna	September 30, 2000	Ondřejov	P. Pravec, P. Kušnirák	·	1.2 km	MPC · JPL
71784	2000 SG_{171}	—	September 24, 2000	Socorro	LINEAR	·	2.7 km	MPC · JPL
71785	2000 SY_{177}	—	September 28, 2000	Socorro	LINEAR	·	2.9 km	MPC · JPL
71786	2000 SH_{178}	—	September 28, 2000	Socorro	LINEAR	·	1.8 km	MPC · JPL
71787	2000 SJ_{180}	—	September 28, 2000	Socorro	LINEAR	·	1.4 km	MPC · JPL
71788	2000 ST_{180}	—	September 30, 2000	Elmira	Cecce, A. J.	·	2.1 km	MPC · JPL
71789	2000 SQ_{188}	—	September 21, 2000	Haleakala	NEAT	·	1.3 km	MPC · JPL
71790	2000 SB_{193}	—	September 24, 2000	Socorro	LINEAR	·	1.4 km	MPC · JPL
71791	2000 SE_{198}	—	September 24, 2000	Socorro	LINEAR	·	1.7 km	MPC · JPL
71792	2000 SD_{211}	—	September 25, 2000	Socorro	LINEAR	·	1.8 km	MPC · JPL
71793	2000 SN_{227}	—	September 27, 2000	Socorro	LINEAR	·	1.3 km	MPC · JPL
71794	2000 ST_{227}	—	September 27, 2000	Socorro	LINEAR	EUN	4.0 km	MPC · JPL
71795	2000 SB_{230}	—	September 28, 2000	Socorro	LINEAR	·	1.6 km	MPC · JPL
71796	2000 SU_{230}	—	September 28, 2000	Socorro	LINEAR	·	1.6 km	MPC · JPL
71797	2000 SY_{239}	—	September 28, 2000	Socorro	LINEAR	·	1.2 km	MPC · JPL
71798	2000 SD_{240}	—	September 22, 2000	Socorro	LINEAR	H	1.3 km	MPC · JPL
71799	2000 SE_{260}	—	September 24, 2000	Socorro	LINEAR	·	1.6 km	MPC · JPL
71800	2000 SM_{264}	—	September 26, 2000	Socorro	LINEAR	·	5.0 km	MPC · JPL

== 71801–71900 ==
back to top

Designation			Discovery			Properties		Ref
Permanent	Provisional	Named after	Date	Site	Discoverer(s)	Category	Diam.	Ref
71801	2000 SZ_{265}	—	September 26, 2000	Socorro	LINEAR	·	1.6 km	MPC · JPL
71802	2000 SO_{272}	—	September 28, 2000	Socorro	LINEAR	·	1.2 km	MPC · JPL
71803	2000 SF_{275}	—	September 28, 2000	Socorro	LINEAR	·	2.8 km	MPC · JPL
71804	2000 SC_{278}	—	September 30, 2000	Socorro	LINEAR	·	1.5 km	MPC · JPL
71805	2000 SG_{295}	—	September 27, 2000	Socorro	LINEAR	·	1.8 km	MPC · JPL
71806	2000 SF_{296}	—	September 27, 2000	Socorro	LINEAR	PHO	3.0 km	MPC · JPL
71807	2000 SF_{301}	—	September 28, 2000	Socorro	LINEAR	·	1.7 km	MPC · JPL
71808	2000 SX_{306}	—	September 30, 2000	Socorro	LINEAR	·	4.9 km	MPC · JPL
71809	2000 SX_{319}	—	September 27, 2000	Socorro	LINEAR	·	5.0 km	MPC · JPL
71810	2000 TJ_{15}	—	October 1, 2000	Socorro	LINEAR	·	1.3 km	MPC · JPL
71811	2000 TG_{28}	—	October 3, 2000	Socorro	LINEAR	·	1.4 km	MPC · JPL
71812	2000 TT_{67}	—	October 2, 2000	Socorro	LINEAR	·	1.8 km	MPC · JPL
71813	2000 UZ	—	October 21, 2000	Višnjan Observatory	K. Korlević	·	2.0 km	MPC · JPL
71814	2000 UU_{2}	—	October 22, 2000	Bergisch Gladbach	W. Bickel	·	2.6 km	MPC · JPL
71815	2000 UB_{5}	—	October 24, 2000	Socorro	LINEAR	·	4.2 km	MPC · JPL
71816	2000 UY_{7}	—	October 24, 2000	Socorro	LINEAR	·	3.2 km	MPC · JPL
71817	2000 UR_{12}	—	October 25, 2000	Socorro	LINEAR	V	1.6 km	MPC · JPL
71818	2000 UH_{19}	—	October 21, 2000	Socorro	LINEAR	H	1.9 km	MPC · JPL
71819	2000 UJ_{19}	—	October 24, 2000	Socorro	LINEAR	·	1.5 km	MPC · JPL
71820	2000 UF_{24}	—	October 24, 2000	Socorro	LINEAR	·	2.4 km	MPC · JPL
71821	2000 UR_{34}	—	October 24, 2000	Socorro	LINEAR	·	1.6 km	MPC · JPL
71822	2000 UZ_{35}	—	October 24, 2000	Socorro	LINEAR	·	3.4 km	MPC · JPL
71823	2000 UG_{36}	—	October 24, 2000	Socorro	LINEAR	·	1.5 km	MPC · JPL
71824	2000 UA_{41}	—	October 24, 2000	Socorro	LINEAR	·	2.4 km	MPC · JPL
71825	2000 UW_{41}	—	October 24, 2000	Socorro	LINEAR	V	1.8 km	MPC · JPL
71826	2000 UX_{43}	—	October 24, 2000	Socorro	LINEAR	·	2.2 km	MPC · JPL
71827	2000 UD_{46}	—	October 24, 2000	Socorro	LINEAR	·	1.8 km	MPC · JPL
71828	2000 UE_{53}	—	October 24, 2000	Socorro	LINEAR	·	2.7 km	MPC · JPL
71829	2000 UK_{53}	—	October 24, 2000	Socorro	LINEAR	V	1.9 km	MPC · JPL
71830	2000 UL_{56}	—	October 24, 2000	Socorro	LINEAR	·	1.7 km	MPC · JPL
71831	2000 UN_{56}	—	October 24, 2000	Socorro	LINEAR	·	1.9 km	MPC · JPL
71832	2000 UQ_{63}	—	October 25, 2000	Socorro	LINEAR	·	2.8 km	MPC · JPL
71833	2000 UJ_{65}	—	October 25, 2000	Socorro	LINEAR	·	1.5 km	MPC · JPL
71834	2000 UL_{65}	—	October 25, 2000	Socorro	LINEAR	·	1.5 km	MPC · JPL
71835	2000 UJ_{69}	—	October 25, 2000	Socorro	LINEAR	V	1.2 km	MPC · JPL
71836	2000 UO_{69}	—	October 25, 2000	Socorro	LINEAR	·	2.4 km	MPC · JPL
71837	2000 US_{69}	—	October 25, 2000	Socorro	LINEAR	·	3.3 km	MPC · JPL
71838	2000 UK_{70}	—	October 25, 2000	Socorro	LINEAR	·	2.0 km	MPC · JPL
71839	2000 UW_{70}	—	October 25, 2000	Socorro	LINEAR	·	1.3 km	MPC · JPL
71840	2000 US_{74}	—	October 30, 2000	Socorro	LINEAR	·	2.0 km	MPC · JPL
71841	2000 UY_{77}	—	October 24, 2000	Socorro	LINEAR	·	1.9 km	MPC · JPL
71842	2000 UG_{80}	—	October 24, 2000	Socorro	LINEAR	·	1.9 km	MPC · JPL
71843	2000 UL_{80}	—	October 24, 2000	Socorro	LINEAR	·	1.6 km	MPC · JPL
71844	2000 UB_{81}	—	October 24, 2000	Socorro	LINEAR	·	2.2 km	MPC · JPL
71845	2000 UN_{93}	—	October 25, 2000	Socorro	LINEAR	·	4.2 km	MPC · JPL
71846	2000 UM_{96}	—	October 25, 2000	Socorro	LINEAR	V	1.6 km	MPC · JPL
71847	2000 UU_{97}	—	October 25, 2000	Socorro	LINEAR	·	2.8 km	MPC · JPL
71848	2000 UJ_{100}	—	October 25, 2000	Socorro	LINEAR	·	2.5 km	MPC · JPL
71849	2000 UB_{102}	—	October 25, 2000	Socorro	LINEAR	·	2.6 km	MPC · JPL
71850	2000 UJ_{103}	—	October 25, 2000	Socorro	LINEAR	·	1.9 km	MPC · JPL
71851	2000 UN_{104}	—	October 25, 2000	Socorro	LINEAR	·	2.1 km	MPC · JPL
71852	2000 UU_{105}	—	October 29, 2000	Socorro	LINEAR	V	1.8 km	MPC · JPL
71853	2000 UE_{109}	—	October 31, 2000	Socorro	LINEAR	·	1.7 km	MPC · JPL
71854	2000 UF_{109}	—	October 31, 2000	Socorro	LINEAR	·	1.3 km	MPC · JPL
71855 Incamajorca	2000 UF_{110}	Incamajorca	October 31, 2000	Mallorca	Sanchez, S., Blasco, M.	·	2.2 km	MPC · JPL
71856	2000 VV_{4}	—	November 1, 2000	Socorro	LINEAR	·	1.5 km	MPC · JPL
71857	2000 VY_{10}	—	November 1, 2000	Socorro	LINEAR	·	1.7 km	MPC · JPL
71858	2000 VM_{12}	—	November 1, 2000	Socorro	LINEAR	·	1.3 km	MPC · JPL
71859	2000 VR_{14}	—	November 1, 2000	Socorro	LINEAR	·	1.8 km	MPC · JPL
71860	2000 VD_{18}	—	November 1, 2000	Socorro	LINEAR	·	1.8 km	MPC · JPL
71861	2000 VP_{18}	—	November 1, 2000	Socorro	LINEAR	·	1.6 km	MPC · JPL
71862	2000 VO_{23}	—	November 1, 2000	Socorro	LINEAR	·	2.3 km	MPC · JPL
71863	2000 VE_{26}	—	November 1, 2000	Socorro	LINEAR	·	1.8 km	MPC · JPL
71864	2000 VV_{26}	—	November 1, 2000	Socorro	LINEAR	·	2.5 km	MPC · JPL
71865	2000 VE_{27}	—	November 1, 2000	Socorro	LINEAR	V	1.7 km	MPC · JPL
71866	2000 VN_{27}	—	November 1, 2000	Socorro	LINEAR	·	1.7 km	MPC · JPL
71867	2000 VX_{28}	—	November 1, 2000	Socorro	LINEAR	(2076)	2.0 km	MPC · JPL
71868	2000 VX_{30}	—	November 1, 2000	Socorro	LINEAR	·	2.8 km	MPC · JPL
71869	2000 VF_{32}	—	November 1, 2000	Socorro	LINEAR	·	1.8 km	MPC · JPL
71870	2000 VZ_{32}	—	November 1, 2000	Socorro	LINEAR	·	2.0 km	MPC · JPL
71871	2000 VD_{37}	—	November 1, 2000	Socorro	LINEAR	·	3.1 km	MPC · JPL
71872	2000 VB_{42}	—	November 1, 2000	Socorro	LINEAR	·	3.4 km	MPC · JPL
71873	2000 VV_{46}	—	November 3, 2000	Socorro	LINEAR	·	4.2 km	MPC · JPL
71874	2000 VM_{47}	—	November 3, 2000	Socorro	LINEAR	V	2.4 km	MPC · JPL
71875	2000 VT_{48}	—	November 2, 2000	Socorro	LINEAR	·	1.7 km	MPC · JPL
71876	2000 VK_{49}	—	November 2, 2000	Socorro	LINEAR	·	1.8 km	MPC · JPL
71877	2000 VT_{49}	—	November 2, 2000	Socorro	LINEAR	·	2.0 km	MPC · JPL
71878	2000 VA_{50}	—	November 2, 2000	Socorro	LINEAR	·	1.9 km	MPC · JPL
71879	2000 VS_{50}	—	November 2, 2000	Socorro	LINEAR	slow	1.9 km	MPC · JPL
71880	2000 VR_{51}	—	November 3, 2000	Socorro	LINEAR	·	1.9 km	MPC · JPL
71881	2000 VG_{52}	—	November 3, 2000	Socorro	LINEAR	V	2.4 km	MPC · JPL
71882	2000 VR_{53}	—	November 3, 2000	Socorro	LINEAR	V	2.3 km	MPC · JPL
71883	2000 VO_{56}	—	November 3, 2000	Socorro	LINEAR	·	1.6 km	MPC · JPL
71884	2000 VK_{59}	—	November 6, 2000	Socorro	LINEAR	·	3.8 km	MPC · JPL
71885 Denning	2000 WD	Denning	November 16, 2000	Kitt Peak	Spacewatch	·	2.0 km	MPC · JPL
71886	2000 WH	—	November 16, 2000	Kitt Peak	Spacewatch	·	3.4 km	MPC · JPL
71887	2000 WW	—	November 17, 2000	Desert Beaver	W. K. Y. Yeung	·	2.4 km	MPC · JPL
71888	2000 WN_{5}	—	November 19, 2000	Socorro	LINEAR	·	2.1 km	MPC · JPL
71889	2000 WT_{5}	—	November 19, 2000	Socorro	LINEAR	·	1.7 km	MPC · JPL
71890	2000 WK_{6}	—	November 20, 2000	Farpoint	Farpoint	·	1.2 km	MPC · JPL
71891	2000 WV_{6}	—	November 19, 2000	Socorro	LINEAR	·	2.0 km	MPC · JPL
71892	2000 WY_{6}	—	November 19, 2000	Socorro	LINEAR	V	1.5 km	MPC · JPL
71893	2000 WM_{7}	—	November 20, 2000	Socorro	LINEAR	·	1.4 km	MPC · JPL
71894	2000 WS_{9}	—	November 20, 2000	Desert Beaver	W. K. Y. Yeung	·	3.5 km	MPC · JPL
71895	2000 WM_{11}	—	November 23, 2000	Desert Beaver	W. K. Y. Yeung	·	1.9 km	MPC · JPL
71896	2000 WN_{11}	—	November 22, 2000	Kitt Peak	Spacewatch	NYS	2.2 km	MPC · JPL
71897	2000 WQ_{14}	—	November 20, 2000	Socorro	LINEAR	·	2.3 km	MPC · JPL
71898	2000 WU_{14}	—	November 20, 2000	Socorro	LINEAR	·	2.4 km	MPC · JPL
71899	2000 WA_{16}	—	November 21, 2000	Socorro	LINEAR	·	1.5 km	MPC · JPL
71900	2000 WU_{18}	—	November 21, 2000	Socorro	LINEAR	·	3.7 km	MPC · JPL

== 71901–72000 ==
back to top

Designation			Discovery			Properties		Ref
Permanent	Provisional	Named after	Date	Site	Discoverer(s)	Category	Diam.	Ref
71901	2000 WS_{23}	—	November 20, 2000	Socorro	LINEAR	V	2.2 km	MPC · JPL
71902	2000 WB_{25}	—	November 20, 2000	Socorro	LINEAR	·	2.2 km	MPC · JPL
71903	2000 WO_{25}	—	November 21, 2000	Socorro	LINEAR	slow	3.4 km	MPC · JPL
71904	2000 WB_{27}	—	November 26, 2000	Desert Beaver	W. K. Y. Yeung	·	2.3 km	MPC · JPL
71905	2000 WF_{27}	—	November 26, 2000	Desert Beaver	W. K. Y. Yeung	·	6.3 km	MPC · JPL
71906	2000 WP_{30}	—	November 20, 2000	Socorro	LINEAR	·	1.6 km	MPC · JPL
71907	2000 WN_{32}	—	November 20, 2000	Socorro	LINEAR	·	3.7 km	MPC · JPL
71908	2000 WC_{37}	—	November 20, 2000	Socorro	LINEAR	·	2.9 km	MPC · JPL
71909	2000 WV_{39}	—	November 20, 2000	Socorro	LINEAR	·	1.5 km	MPC · JPL
71910	2000 WJ_{41}	—	November 20, 2000	Socorro	LINEAR	·	1.8 km	MPC · JPL
71911	2000 WK_{43}	—	November 21, 2000	Socorro	LINEAR	·	1.4 km	MPC · JPL
71912	2000 WQ_{43}	—	November 21, 2000	Socorro	LINEAR	·	2.0 km	MPC · JPL
71913	2000 WF_{45}	—	November 21, 2000	Socorro	LINEAR	·	1.6 km	MPC · JPL
71914	2000 WO_{45}	—	November 21, 2000	Socorro	LINEAR	·	1.8 km	MPC · JPL
71915	2000 WK_{48}	—	November 21, 2000	Socorro	LINEAR	PHO	4.1 km	MPC · JPL
71916	2000 WV_{48}	—	November 21, 2000	Socorro	LINEAR	·	2.9 km	MPC · JPL
71917	2000 WK_{49}	—	November 21, 2000	Socorro	LINEAR	·	2.8 km	MPC · JPL
71918	2000 WN_{54}	—	November 20, 2000	Socorro	LINEAR	·	3.4 km	MPC · JPL
71919	2000 WT_{54}	—	November 20, 2000	Socorro	LINEAR	NYS	3.0 km	MPC · JPL
71920	2000 WX_{54}	—	November 20, 2000	Socorro	LINEAR	MAR	3.0 km	MPC · JPL
71921	2000 WY_{54}	—	November 20, 2000	Socorro	LINEAR	·	2.1 km	MPC · JPL
71922	2000 WW_{55}	—	November 20, 2000	Socorro	LINEAR	·	3.6 km	MPC · JPL
71923	2000 WB_{56}	—	November 20, 2000	Socorro	LINEAR	·	2.8 km	MPC · JPL
71924	2000 WE_{56}	—	November 20, 2000	Socorro	LINEAR	·	5.0 km	MPC · JPL
71925	2000 WQ_{56}	—	November 21, 2000	Socorro	LINEAR	·	2.3 km	MPC · JPL
71926	2000 WN_{59}	—	November 21, 2000	Socorro	LINEAR	fast	1.4 km	MPC · JPL
71927	2000 WQ_{59}	—	November 21, 2000	Socorro	LINEAR	NYS	2.6 km	MPC · JPL
71928	2000 WB_{61}	—	November 21, 2000	Socorro	LINEAR	(2076)	2.5 km	MPC · JPL
71929	2000 WD_{61}	—	November 21, 2000	Socorro	LINEAR	·	2.9 km	MPC · JPL
71930	2000 WM_{61}	—	November 21, 2000	Socorro	LINEAR	·	3.4 km	MPC · JPL
71931	2000 WN_{61}	—	November 21, 2000	Socorro	LINEAR	·	1.6 km	MPC · JPL
71932	2000 WO_{61}	—	November 21, 2000	Socorro	LINEAR	ERI	4.4 km	MPC · JPL
71933	2000 WW_{61}	—	November 21, 2000	Socorro	LINEAR	·	2.3 km	MPC · JPL
71934	2000 WA_{63}	—	November 26, 2000	Desert Beaver	W. K. Y. Yeung	NYS	5.1 km	MPC · JPL
71935	2000 WF_{63}	—	November 28, 2000	Haleakala	NEAT	H	1.5 km	MPC · JPL
71936	2000 WW_{67}	—	November 20, 2000	Anderson Mesa	LONEOS	EUN	3.8 km	MPC · JPL
71937	2000 WT_{70}	—	November 19, 2000	Socorro	LINEAR	·	1.8 km	MPC · JPL
71938	2000 WO_{73}	—	November 20, 2000	Socorro	LINEAR	·	2.3 km	MPC · JPL
71939	2000 WZ_{74}	—	November 20, 2000	Socorro	LINEAR	·	1.6 km	MPC · JPL
71940	2000 WC_{78}	—	November 20, 2000	Socorro	LINEAR	·	2.8 km	MPC · JPL
71941	2000 WS_{80}	—	November 20, 2000	Socorro	LINEAR	·	1.8 km	MPC · JPL
71942	2000 WU_{82}	—	November 20, 2000	Socorro	LINEAR	·	1.5 km	MPC · JPL
71943	2000 WQ_{85}	—	November 20, 2000	Socorro	LINEAR	·	1.4 km	MPC · JPL
71944	2000 WB_{87}	—	November 20, 2000	Socorro	LINEAR	·	3.6 km	MPC · JPL
71945	2000 WG_{87}	—	November 20, 2000	Socorro	LINEAR	·	3.5 km	MPC · JPL
71946	2000 WS_{87}	—	November 20, 2000	Socorro	LINEAR	·	1.9 km	MPC · JPL
71947	2000 WW_{87}	—	November 20, 2000	Socorro	LINEAR	·	2.6 km	MPC · JPL
71948	2000 WR_{88}	—	November 20, 2000	Socorro	LINEAR	·	2.7 km	MPC · JPL
71949	2000 WT_{91}	—	November 21, 2000	Socorro	LINEAR	·	2.4 km	MPC · JPL
71950	2000 WN_{98}	—	November 21, 2000	Socorro	LINEAR	V	2.2 km	MPC · JPL
71951	2000 WY_{99}	—	November 21, 2000	Socorro	LINEAR	·	2.2 km	MPC · JPL
71952	2000 WW_{100}	—	November 21, 2000	Socorro	LINEAR	·	2.6 km	MPC · JPL
71953	2000 WC_{101}	—	November 21, 2000	Socorro	LINEAR	·	4.2 km	MPC · JPL
71954	2000 WW_{104}	—	November 24, 2000	Kitt Peak	Spacewatch	·	1.9 km	MPC · JPL
71955	2000 WD_{107}	—	November 26, 2000	Needville	A. Cruz, W. G. Dillon	·	1.4 km	MPC · JPL
71956	2000 WH_{107}	—	November 30, 2000	Farpoint	G. Hug	EUN	2.5 km	MPC · JPL
71957	2000 WO_{109}	—	November 20, 2000	Socorro	LINEAR	·	2.4 km	MPC · JPL
71958	2000 WR_{110}	—	November 20, 2000	Socorro	LINEAR	·	1.3 km	MPC · JPL
71959	2000 WP_{112}	—	November 20, 2000	Socorro	LINEAR	·	1.8 km	MPC · JPL
71960	2000 WV_{114}	—	November 20, 2000	Socorro	LINEAR	·	2.1 km	MPC · JPL
71961	2000 WO_{115}	—	November 20, 2000	Socorro	LINEAR	·	1.3 km	MPC · JPL
71962	2000 WF_{116}	—	November 20, 2000	Socorro	LINEAR	NYS	2.6 km	MPC · JPL
71963	2000 WJ_{116}	—	November 20, 2000	Socorro	LINEAR	·	2.6 km	MPC · JPL
71964	2000 WC_{117}	—	November 20, 2000	Socorro	LINEAR	V	1.6 km	MPC · JPL
71965	2000 WE_{118}	—	November 20, 2000	Socorro	LINEAR	·	3.2 km	MPC · JPL
71966	2000 WP_{118}	—	November 20, 2000	Socorro	LINEAR	PHO	7.1 km	MPC · JPL
71967	2000 WA_{120}	—	November 20, 2000	Socorro	LINEAR	·	2.2 km	MPC · JPL
71968	2000 WE_{120}	—	November 20, 2000	Socorro	LINEAR	slow	2.1 km	MPC · JPL
71969	2000 WE_{123}	—	November 29, 2000	Socorro	LINEAR	·	2.9 km	MPC · JPL
71970	2000 WM_{123}	—	November 29, 2000	Socorro	LINEAR	·	3.4 km	MPC · JPL
71971 Lindaketcham	2000 WK_{126}	Lindaketcham	November 25, 2000	Carbuncle Hill	Pray, D. P.	·	2.8 km	MPC · JPL
71972	2000 WQ_{126}	—	November 16, 2000	Kitt Peak	Spacewatch	·	2.0 km	MPC · JPL
71973	2000 WZ_{127}	—	November 18, 2000	Kitt Peak	Spacewatch	·	1.9 km	MPC · JPL
71974	2000 WB_{131}	—	November 20, 2000	Anderson Mesa	LONEOS	·	2.1 km	MPC · JPL
71975	2000 WG_{133}	—	November 19, 2000	Socorro	LINEAR	PHO	4.8 km	MPC · JPL
71976	2000 WD_{136}	—	November 20, 2000	Socorro	LINEAR	·	1.5 km	MPC · JPL
71977	2000 WS_{137}	—	November 20, 2000	Socorro	LINEAR	·	3.2 km	MPC · JPL
71978	2000 WJ_{143}	—	November 20, 2000	Anderson Mesa	LONEOS	·	1.6 km	MPC · JPL
71979	2000 WN_{143}	—	November 20, 2000	Socorro	LINEAR	PHO	2.9 km	MPC · JPL
71980	2000 WU_{152}	—	November 29, 2000	Socorro	LINEAR	·	1.7 km	MPC · JPL
71981	2000 WB_{153}	—	November 29, 2000	Socorro	LINEAR	·	1.4 km	MPC · JPL
71982	2000 WY_{155}	—	November 30, 2000	Socorro	LINEAR	·	2.1 km	MPC · JPL
71983	2000 WG_{157}	—	November 30, 2000	Socorro	LINEAR	V · slow	1.8 km	MPC · JPL
71984	2000 WM_{157}	—	November 30, 2000	Socorro	LINEAR	·	2.2 km	MPC · JPL
71985	2000 WY_{158}	—	November 27, 2000	Socorro	LINEAR	·	1.9 km	MPC · JPL
71986	2000 WL_{159}	—	November 30, 2000	Socorro	LINEAR	V	1.6 km	MPC · JPL
71987	2000 WU_{160}	—	November 20, 2000	Anderson Mesa	LONEOS	·	2.1 km	MPC · JPL
71988	2000 WQ_{163}	—	November 21, 2000	Socorro	LINEAR	·	2.6 km	MPC · JPL
71989	2000 WF_{167}	—	November 24, 2000	Anderson Mesa	LONEOS	·	1.7 km	MPC · JPL
71990	2000 WG_{167}	—	November 24, 2000	Anderson Mesa	LONEOS	·	1.9 km	MPC · JPL
71991	2000 WR_{168}	—	November 25, 2000	Anderson Mesa	LONEOS	·	2.2 km	MPC · JPL
71992	2000 WF_{169}	—	November 25, 2000	Anderson Mesa	LONEOS	slow	2.3 km	MPC · JPL
71993	2000 WG_{173}	—	November 25, 2000	Anderson Mesa	LONEOS	NYS	2.6 km	MPC · JPL
71994	2000 WU_{176}	—	November 27, 2000	Socorro	LINEAR	·	2.7 km	MPC · JPL
71995	2000 WW_{177}	—	November 27, 2000	Kitt Peak	Spacewatch	NYS ·	3.1 km	MPC · JPL
71996	2000 WB_{178}	—	November 28, 2000	Kitt Peak	Spacewatch	V	1.9 km	MPC · JPL
71997	2000 WD_{178}	—	November 28, 2000	Kitt Peak	Spacewatch	·	1.9 km	MPC · JPL
71998	2000 WS_{179}	—	November 26, 2000	Socorro	LINEAR	·	3.3 km	MPC · JPL
71999	2000 WC_{185}	—	November 29, 2000	Socorro	LINEAR	·	1.6 km	MPC · JPL
72000	2000 WJ_{186}	—	November 27, 2000	Socorro	LINEAR	·	1.9 km	MPC · JPL

back to top

== See also ==
- Meanings of minor-planet names: 71001–72000
