= Meanings of minor-planet names: 71001–72000 =

As minor planet discoveries are confirmed, they are given a permanent number by the IAU's Minor Planet Center (MPC), and the discoverers can then submit names for them, following the IAU's naming conventions. The list below concerns those minor planets in the specified number-range that have received names, and explains the meanings of those names.

Official naming citations of newly named small Solar System bodies are approved and published in a bulletin by IAU's Working Group for Small Bodies Nomenclature (WGSBN). Before May 2021, citations were published in MPC's Minor Planet Circulars for many decades. Recent citations can also be found on the JPL Small-Body Database (SBDB). Until his death in 2016, German astronomer Lutz D. Schmadel compiled these citations into the Dictionary of Minor Planet Names (DMP) and regularly updated the collection.

Based on Paul Herget's The Names of the Minor Planets, Schmadel also researched the unclear origin of numerous asteroids, most of which had been named prior to World War II. This article incorporates text from this source, which is in the public domain: SBDB New namings may only be added to this list below after official publication as the preannouncement of names is condemned. The WGSBN publishes a comprehensive guideline for the naming rules of non-cometary small Solar System bodies.

== 71001–71100 ==
| Named minor planet | Provisional | This minor planet was named for... | Ref · Catalog |
|---|---|---|---|
| 71001 Natspasoc | 1999 XL_{37} | The National Space Society (NSS), an international space advocacy non-profit organization, was established in the United States on 1986 Mar. 8, from the merger of two space advocacy organizations, the National Space Institute, founded by Wernher von Braun, and the L5 Society, based on the concepts of Gerard K. O'Neill. | JPL · 71001 |

== 71101–71200 ==
back to top

| Named minor planet | Provisional | This minor planet was named for... | Ref · Catalog |
|---|---|---|---|
There are no named minor planets in this number range

== 71201–71300 ==
back to top

| Named minor planet | Provisional | This minor planet was named for... | Ref · Catalog |
|---|---|---|---|
| 71282 Holuby | 2000 AC_{48} | Jozef Ludovít Holuby (1836–1923) was a Slovak Lutheran priest, writer, revivalist, botanist and ethnographer. He obtained an honorary doctorate of natural sciences at the Faculty of Natural Sciences at Charles University in Prague in 1922. | JPL · 71282 |

== 71301–71400 ==
back to top

| Named minor planet | Provisional | This minor planet was named for... | Ref · Catalog |
|---|---|---|---|
There are no named minor planets in this number range

== 71401–71500 ==
back to top

| Named minor planet | Provisional | This minor planet was named for... | Ref · Catalog |
|---|---|---|---|
| 71445 Marc | 2000 AE_{231} | Marc Y. Wasserman (born 1973), son of the American astronomer Lawrence H. Wasserman who discovered this minor planet. At the time of this citation, Marc was a fellow in clinical neurophysiology at Loyola University Medical Center in Maywood, Illinois. | JPL · 71445 |
| 71461 Chowmeeyee | 2000 BA_{4} | Chow Mee Yee (1960–2005) was a classmate of the discoverer Bill Yeung at the Pui Ching Middle School in Hong Kong. | JPL · 71461 |
| 71480 Roberthatt | 2000 BZ_{28} | Robert Hatt (1902–1989), Director of the Cranbrook Institute of Science in Bloomfield Hills, Michigan (1935–1967). A Fellow in the Zoological Society of London, the New York Zoological Society, and the American Museum of Natural History, his research on the mammals of the U.S. resulted in many scholarly publications. | JPL · 71480 |
| 71482 Jennamarie | 2000 BO_{30} | Jennifer Marie Mayhew (born 1981), a Cayuga-Canadian and wife of the discovering astronomer with the Spacewatch programme. Born in Ontario, she is now a resident in Texas and renowned for her generosity, as a teenager helped disabled children ride horses. Named by her husband of six years, though absent in the military for most of that time, to recognize all families who are separated by war. | JPL · 71482 |
| 71483 Dickgottfried | 2000 BU_{33} | Richard "Dick" Gottfried (born 1939) is retired from Sigma Aldrich Corp. and St. Josephs Hospital (Tucson, AZ), and is currently active with the Tucson Gem and Mineral Show. He is an amateur paleontologist with a collection that is meticulously catalogued and researched beyond the usual "amateur" quality and ability. | JPL · 71483 |
| 71485 Brettman | 2000 BM_{34} | Orville Brettman (born 1947) was exposed to astronomy at the age of 14. He joined the Association of Lunar & Planetary Observers and was a founding member of the Elgin Astronomical Society (Illinois). He became involved with the Astronomical League and was President of the League from 1980 to 1982. | JPL · 71485 |
| 71489 Dynamocamp | 2000 CT_{1} | "Dynamo Camp" is the Italian location of the Hole in the Wall Association, a non-profit organisation that works around the world to promote and operate free summer camps specially designed for children with serious and chronic illnesses. This special camp is located in the Tuscany region near the San Marcello Pistoiese Observatory. JPL | MPC · 71489 |

== 71501–71600 ==
back to top

| Named minor planet | Provisional | This minor planet was named for... | Ref · Catalog |
|---|---|---|---|
| 71538 Robertfried | 2000 CB_{107} | Robert E. Fried (1930–2003), a former airline pilot, who was inspired by Patrick Moore to build his own 16-inch telescope. Fried did professional quality photometry on variable stars from his Braeside Observatory, eventually located in Flagstaff, Arizona. He served as President of the Astronomical League from 1974 to 1975 and 1977 to 1978. | JPL · 71538 |
| 71539 VanZandt | 2000 CG_{112} | Rollin P. VanZandt (1911–1994), known as "Van" to most, was very active in the Astronomical League as an advocate for professional-amateur collaborations during the 1970s. | JPL · 71539 |
| 71555 Manuecharpentier | 2000 DY_{15} | Emmanuelle Marie Charpentier (b. 1968), a French professor of microbiology, genetics and biochemistry at the Max Planck Institute for Infection Biology, Berlin | IAU · 71555 |
| 71556 Page | 2000 DW_{17} | Gary L. Page (born 1947) is an American physicist and astrophysicist at the George Mason University, Fairfax, Virginia, who investigates the presence and effects of non-baryonic matter in the Solar System (Src, Src). | JPL · 71556 |

== 71601–71700 ==
back to top

| Named minor planet | Provisional | This minor planet was named for... | Ref · Catalog |
|---|---|---|---|
| 71615 Ramakers | 2000 EM_{20} | Theo Ramakers (born 1943) is Assistant Coordinator for the Association of Lunar and Planetary Observers (ALPO) Solar Section. He has been instrumental in organizing the large database of tens of thousands of images and observations from amateur astronomers around the world, making them available on the ALPO website. | JPL · 71615 |
| 71669 Dodsonprince | 2000 EH_{157} | Helen Dodson Prince (1905–2002) was an astronomer known for her work on solar flares at the University of Michigan and the McMath-Hulbert Observatory. She was the Observatory's associate director and received the Annie Jump Cannon Award in 1955. | JPL · 71669 |

== 71701–71800 ==
back to top

| Named minor planet | Provisional | This minor planet was named for... | Ref · Catalog |
|---|---|---|---|
| 71783 Izeryna | 2000 SL_{163} | The Jizera Dark-Sky Park was established in the Jizera Mountains, around the border between the Czech Republic and Poland, in 2009. The name was derived from oread Izerina, a patroness of the region, and from the mineral izeryn that is a local type of ilmenite with a color resembling the darkness of the sky in the park. | JPL · 71783 |

== 71801–71900 ==
back to top

| Named minor planet | Provisional | This minor planet was named for... | Ref · Catalog |
|---|---|---|---|
| 71855 Incamajorca | 2000 UF_{110} | Inca is the second most important municipality on the island of Mallorca. | IAU · 71855 |
| 71885 Denning | 2000 WD | William Frederick Denning (1848–1931) was a British amateur astronomer and renowned for his visual study of the heights and velocities of meteors and for his catalogues of meteor radiants. He also maintained an interest in Jupiter's red spot and discovered five comets, two of them of short period. | JPL · 71885 |

== 71901–72000 ==
back to top

| Named minor planet | Provisional | This minor planet was named for... | Ref · Catalog |
|---|---|---|---|
| 71971 Lindaketcham | 2000 WK_{126} | Linda Ketcham (born 1944) made a generous grant of land space for the construction and operation of Sugarloaf Mountain Observatory in South Deerfield, Massachusetts. | JPL · 71971 |

back to top

| Preceded by 70,001–71,000 | Meanings of minor-planet names List of minor planets: 71,001–72,000 | Succeeded by 72,001–73,000 |
