= List of minor planets: 65001–66000 =

The following is a partial list of minor planets, running from minor-planet number 65001 through 66000, inclusive. The primary data for this and other partial lists is based on JPL's "Small-Body Orbital Elements" and data available from the Minor Planet Center. Critical list information is also provided by the MPC, unless otherwise specified from Lowell Observatory. A detailed description of the table's columns and additional sources are given on the main page including a complete list of every page in this series, and a statistical break-up on the dynamical classification of minor planets.

Also see the summary list of all named bodies in numerical and alphabetical order, and the corresponding naming citations for the number range of this particular list. New namings may only be added to this list after official publication, as the preannouncement of names is condemned by the Working Group for Small Bodies Nomenclature of the International Astronomical Union.

Near-Earth obj.	MBA (inner)	MBA (outer)	Centaur
Mars-crosser	MBA (middle)	Jupiter trojan	Trans-Neptunian obj.
Unclassified

== 65001–65100 ==
Designation			Discovery			Properties		Ref
Permanent	Provisional	Named after	Date	Site	Discoverer(s)	Category	Diam.	Ref
65001 Teodorescu	2002 AF_{67}	Teodorescu	January 9, 2002	Campo Imperatore	F. Bernardi, A. Boattini	·	4.7 km	MPC · JPL
65002	2002 AT_{70}	—	January 8, 2002	Socorro	LINEAR	·	2.6 km	MPC · JPL
65003	2002 AB_{71}	—	January 8, 2002	Socorro	LINEAR	·	4.2 km	MPC · JPL
65004	2002 AM_{71}	—	January 8, 2002	Socorro	LINEAR	NYS	3.0 km	MPC · JPL
65005	2002 AE_{77}	—	January 8, 2002	Socorro	LINEAR	·	3.3 km	MPC · JPL
65006	2002 AN_{78}	—	January 8, 2002	Socorro	LINEAR	·	3.2 km	MPC · JPL
65007	2002 AG_{81}	—	January 9, 2002	Socorro	LINEAR	·	6.2 km	MPC · JPL
65008	2002 AL_{81}	—	January 9, 2002	Socorro	LINEAR	·	2.6 km	MPC · JPL
65009	2002 AO_{81}	—	January 9, 2002	Socorro	LINEAR	slow	3.7 km	MPC · JPL
65010	2002 AR_{82}	—	January 9, 2002	Socorro	LINEAR	·	1.4 km	MPC · JPL
65011	2002 AJ_{83}	—	January 9, 2002	Socorro	LINEAR	·	4.8 km	MPC · JPL
65012	2002 AE_{86}	—	January 9, 2002	Socorro	LINEAR	·	2.6 km	MPC · JPL
65013	2002 AO_{86}	—	January 9, 2002	Socorro	LINEAR	·	6.9 km	MPC · JPL
65014	2002 AU_{88}	—	January 9, 2002	Socorro	LINEAR	·	4.2 km	MPC · JPL
65015	2002 AX_{88}	—	January 9, 2002	Socorro	LINEAR	HYG	5.6 km	MPC · JPL
65016	2002 AF_{89}	—	January 9, 2002	Socorro	LINEAR	·	3.9 km	MPC · JPL
65017	2002 AD_{95}	—	January 8, 2002	Socorro	LINEAR	·	3.6 km	MPC · JPL
65018	2002 AK_{95}	—	January 8, 2002	Socorro	LINEAR	·	1.9 km	MPC · JPL
65019	2002 AC_{99}	—	January 8, 2002	Socorro	LINEAR	EOS	4.2 km	MPC · JPL
65020	2002 AW_{99}	—	January 8, 2002	Socorro	LINEAR	·	7.9 km	MPC · JPL
65021	2002 AY_{103}	—	January 9, 2002	Socorro	LINEAR	·	4.6 km	MPC · JPL
65022	2002 AQ_{104}	—	January 9, 2002	Socorro	LINEAR	·	4.9 km	MPC · JPL
65023	2002 AF_{106}	—	January 9, 2002	Socorro	LINEAR	·	4.2 km	MPC · JPL
65024	2002 AP_{106}	—	January 9, 2002	Socorro	LINEAR	·	4.3 km	MPC · JPL
65025	2002 AS_{106}	—	January 9, 2002	Socorro	LINEAR	·	6.4 km	MPC · JPL
65026	2002 AD_{109}	—	January 9, 2002	Socorro	LINEAR	KOR	3.0 km	MPC · JPL
65027	2002 AH_{109}	—	January 9, 2002	Socorro	LINEAR	·	2.5 km	MPC · JPL
65028	2002 AM_{110}	—	January 9, 2002	Socorro	LINEAR	EOS	4.0 km	MPC · JPL
65029	2002 AC_{111}	—	January 9, 2002	Socorro	LINEAR	HYG	6.6 km	MPC · JPL
65030	2002 AR_{111}	—	January 9, 2002	Socorro	LINEAR	EOS	4.4 km	MPC · JPL
65031	2002 AS_{111}	—	January 9, 2002	Socorro	LINEAR	·	4.1 km	MPC · JPL
65032	2002 AR_{112}	—	January 9, 2002	Socorro	LINEAR	·	2.8 km	MPC · JPL
65033	2002 AW_{112}	—	January 9, 2002	Socorro	LINEAR	·	2.1 km	MPC · JPL
65034	2002 AM_{114}	—	January 9, 2002	Socorro	LINEAR	·	2.6 km	MPC · JPL
65035	2002 AG_{116}	—	January 9, 2002	Socorro	LINEAR	EOS	3.5 km	MPC · JPL
65036	2002 AB_{119}	—	January 9, 2002	Socorro	LINEAR	THM	7.8 km	MPC · JPL
65037	2002 AV_{119}	—	January 9, 2002	Socorro	LINEAR	·	1.4 km	MPC · JPL
65038	2002 AT_{128}	—	January 14, 2002	Desert Eagle	W. K. Y. Yeung	·	2.5 km	MPC · JPL
65039	2002 AK_{129}	—	January 14, 2002	Desert Eagle	W. K. Y. Yeung	·	6.6 km	MPC · JPL
65040	2002 AC_{132}	—	January 8, 2002	Socorro	LINEAR	·	3.9 km	MPC · JPL
65041	2002 AS_{133}	—	January 9, 2002	Socorro	LINEAR	·	5.3 km	MPC · JPL
65042	2002 AF_{135}	—	January 9, 2002	Socorro	LINEAR	KOR	2.9 km	MPC · JPL
65043	2002 AY_{137}	—	January 9, 2002	Socorro	LINEAR	·	4.2 km	MPC · JPL
65044	2002 AH_{139}	—	January 9, 2002	Socorro	LINEAR	·	6.0 km	MPC · JPL
65045	2002 AS_{140}	—	January 13, 2002	Socorro	LINEAR	·	1.8 km	MPC · JPL
65046	2002 AF_{148}	—	January 13, 2002	Palomar	NEAT	MAR	2.1 km	MPC · JPL
65047	2002 AE_{149}	—	January 14, 2002	Socorro	LINEAR	·	2.3 km	MPC · JPL
65048	2002 AW_{151}	—	January 14, 2002	Socorro	LINEAR	·	1.4 km	MPC · JPL
65049	2002 AV_{153}	—	January 14, 2002	Socorro	LINEAR	KOR	2.7 km	MPC · JPL
65050	2002 AZ_{153}	—	January 14, 2002	Socorro	LINEAR	NYS ·	4.6 km	MPC · JPL
65051	2002 AV_{156}	—	January 13, 2002	Socorro	LINEAR	AGN	2.8 km	MPC · JPL
65052	2002 AA_{157}	—	January 13, 2002	Socorro	LINEAR	·	4.2 km	MPC · JPL
65053	2002 AP_{159}	—	January 13, 2002	Socorro	LINEAR	·	5.8 km	MPC · JPL
65054	2002 AF_{169}	—	January 14, 2002	Socorro	LINEAR	PHO	4.4 km	MPC · JPL
65055	2002 AX_{169}	—	January 14, 2002	Socorro	LINEAR	·	2.6 km	MPC · JPL
65056	2002 AH_{170}	—	January 14, 2002	Socorro	LINEAR	AGN	2.4 km	MPC · JPL
65057	2002 AQ_{171}	—	January 14, 2002	Socorro	LINEAR	·	1.6 km	MPC · JPL
65058	2002 AP_{173}	—	January 14, 2002	Socorro	LINEAR	EOS	4.5 km	MPC · JPL
65059	2002 AB_{176}	—	January 14, 2002	Socorro	LINEAR	AGN	2.9 km	MPC · JPL
65060	2002 AD_{177}	—	January 14, 2002	Socorro	LINEAR	·	3.3 km	MPC · JPL
65061	2002 AS_{179}	—	January 14, 2002	Socorro	LINEAR	HYG	5.2 km	MPC · JPL
65062	2002 AD_{181}	—	January 5, 2002	Palomar	NEAT	·	4.6 km	MPC · JPL
65063	2002 AK_{181}	—	January 5, 2002	Palomar	NEAT	·	6.6 km	MPC · JPL
65064	2002 AN_{183}	—	January 6, 2002	Socorro	LINEAR	·	3.7 km	MPC · JPL
65065	2002 AL_{184}	—	January 7, 2002	Anderson Mesa	LONEOS	·	5.6 km	MPC · JPL
65066	2002 AU_{185}	—	January 8, 2002	Socorro	LINEAR	V	1.8 km	MPC · JPL
65067	2002 AE_{186}	—	January 8, 2002	Socorro	LINEAR	·	5.5 km	MPC · JPL
65068	2002 AK_{186}	—	January 8, 2002	Socorro	LINEAR	·	2.2 km	MPC · JPL
65069	2002 AL_{186}	—	January 8, 2002	Socorro	LINEAR	·	4.3 km	MPC · JPL
65070	2002 AD_{187}	—	January 8, 2002	Socorro	LINEAR	·	3.8 km	MPC · JPL
65071	2002 AJ_{188}	—	January 9, 2002	Palomar	NEAT	(1118)	9.2 km	MPC · JPL
65072	2002 AP_{188}	—	January 10, 2002	Palomar	NEAT	·	5.3 km	MPC · JPL
65073	2002 AD_{189}	—	January 10, 2002	Palomar	NEAT	·	4.4 km	MPC · JPL
65074	2002 AM_{189}	—	January 10, 2002	Palomar	NEAT	·	4.1 km	MPC · JPL
65075	2002 AU_{191}	—	January 12, 2002	Kitt Peak	Spacewatch	·	2.9 km	MPC · JPL
65076	2002 AF_{199}	—	January 8, 2002	Socorro	LINEAR	THM	5.7 km	MPC · JPL
65077	2002 AB_{202}	—	January 9, 2002	Socorro	LINEAR	·	7.5 km	MPC · JPL
65078	2002 BR_{3}	—	January 18, 2002	Anderson Mesa	LONEOS	·	7.2 km	MPC · JPL
65079	2002 BV_{6}	—	January 18, 2002	Socorro	LINEAR	·	5.2 km	MPC · JPL
65080	2002 BE_{8}	—	January 18, 2002	Socorro	LINEAR	KOR	3.2 km	MPC · JPL
65081	2002 BS_{11}	—	January 19, 2002	Socorro	LINEAR	·	8.8 km	MPC · JPL
65082	2002 BA_{13}	—	January 18, 2002	Socorro	LINEAR	EOS	5.5 km	MPC · JPL
65083	2002 BL_{15}	—	January 19, 2002	Socorro	LINEAR	·	3.2 km	MPC · JPL
65084	2002 BJ_{16}	—	January 19, 2002	Socorro	LINEAR	·	3.7 km	MPC · JPL
65085	2002 BB_{20}	—	January 22, 2002	Socorro	LINEAR	THM	5.2 km	MPC · JPL
65086	2002 BY_{20}	—	January 25, 2002	Socorro	LINEAR	HNS	3.7 km	MPC · JPL
65087	2002 BM_{22}	—	January 22, 2002	Socorro	LINEAR	·	3.8 km	MPC · JPL
65088	2002 BU_{23}	—	January 23, 2002	Socorro	LINEAR	EOS	4.3 km	MPC · JPL
65089	2002 BB_{26}	—	January 26, 2002	Socorro	LINEAR	·	2.6 km	MPC · JPL
65090	2002 BT_{30}	—	January 23, 2002	Socorro	LINEAR	MAR	2.3 km	MPC · JPL
65091 Saramagrin	2002 CF	Saramagrin	February 1, 2002	Cima Ekar	ADAS	V	1.8 km	MPC · JPL
65092	2002 CK_{1}	—	February 3, 2002	Anderson Mesa	LONEOS	·	3.5 km	MPC · JPL
65093	2002 CG_{2}	—	February 3, 2002	Palomar	NEAT	·	2.6 km	MPC · JPL
65094	2002 CU_{2}	—	February 3, 2002	Palomar	NEAT	·	3.0 km	MPC · JPL
65095	2002 CN_{3}	—	February 3, 2002	Palomar	NEAT	·	9.6 km	MPC · JPL
65096	2002 CQ_{3}	—	February 3, 2002	Palomar	NEAT	ERI	3.5 km	MPC · JPL
65097	2002 CC_{4}	—	February 6, 2002	Socorro	LINEAR	L4	22 km	MPC · JPL
65098	2002 CG_{5}	—	February 4, 2002	Palomar	NEAT	·	3.0 km	MPC · JPL
65099	2002 CH_{13}	—	February 8, 2002	Fountain Hills	C. W. Juels, P. R. Holvorcem	·	3.1 km	MPC · JPL
65100 Birtwhistle	2002 CR_{15}	Birtwhistle	February 8, 2002	Fountain Hills	C. W. Juels, P. R. Holvorcem	·	9.5 km	MPC · JPL

== 65101–65200 ==
back to top

Designation			Discovery			Properties		Ref
Permanent	Provisional	Named after	Date	Site	Discoverer(s)	Category	Diam.	Ref
65101	2002 CS_{15}	—	February 8, 2002	Fountain Hills	C. W. Juels, P. R. Holvorcem	·	10 km	MPC · JPL
65102	2002 CY_{17}	—	February 6, 2002	Socorro	LINEAR	·	7.9 km	MPC · JPL
65103	2002 CQ_{18}	—	February 6, 2002	Socorro	LINEAR	·	3.5 km	MPC · JPL
65104	2002 CK_{20}	—	February 4, 2002	Palomar	NEAT	·	1.8 km	MPC · JPL
65105	2002 CR_{26}	—	February 6, 2002	Socorro	LINEAR	·	2.7 km	MPC · JPL
65106	2002 CW_{26}	—	February 6, 2002	Socorro	LINEAR	·	8.0 km	MPC · JPL
65107	2002 CW_{31}	—	February 6, 2002	Socorro	LINEAR	·	4.4 km	MPC · JPL
65108	2002 CR_{33}	—	February 6, 2002	Socorro	LINEAR	·	4.6 km	MPC · JPL
65109	2002 CV_{36}	—	February 7, 2002	Socorro	LINEAR	L4	20 km	MPC · JPL
65110	2002 CO_{37}	—	February 7, 2002	Socorro	LINEAR	HYG	6.6 km	MPC · JPL
65111	2002 CG_{40}	—	February 6, 2002	Haleakala	NEAT	L4	21 km	MPC · JPL
65112	2002 CR_{44}	—	February 6, 2002	Kitt Peak	Spacewatch	·	3.0 km	MPC · JPL
65113	2002 CD_{47}	—	February 3, 2002	Haleakala	NEAT	EUN	3.1 km	MPC · JPL
65114	2002 CH_{49}	—	February 3, 2002	Haleakala	NEAT	·	3.5 km	MPC · JPL
65115	2002 CK_{50}	—	February 12, 2002	Desert Eagle	W. K. Y. Yeung	·	2.9 km	MPC · JPL
65116	2002 CH_{51}	—	February 12, 2002	Desert Eagle	W. K. Y. Yeung	·	7.2 km	MPC · JPL
65117	2002 CW_{51}	—	February 12, 2002	Desert Eagle	W. K. Y. Yeung	·	1.7 km	MPC · JPL
65118	2002 CD_{52}	—	February 12, 2002	Desert Eagle	W. K. Y. Yeung	·	7.9 km	MPC · JPL
65119	2002 CF_{53}	—	February 7, 2002	Socorro	LINEAR	·	6.7 km	MPC · JPL
65120	2002 CB_{54}	—	February 7, 2002	Socorro	LINEAR	·	7.4 km	MPC · JPL
65121	2002 CT_{56}	—	February 7, 2002	Socorro	LINEAR	·	9.7 km	MPC · JPL
65122	2002 CB_{59}	—	February 13, 2002	Socorro	LINEAR	·	10 km	MPC · JPL
65123	2002 CN_{61}	—	February 6, 2002	Socorro	LINEAR	EOS	4.0 km	MPC · JPL
65124	2002 CV_{61}	—	February 6, 2002	Socorro	LINEAR	EOS ·	3.7 km	MPC · JPL
65125	2002 CQ_{62}	—	February 6, 2002	Socorro	LINEAR	·	7.6 km	MPC · JPL
65126	2002 CS_{62}	—	February 6, 2002	Socorro	LINEAR	EOS	4.4 km	MPC · JPL
65127	2002 CG_{63}	—	February 6, 2002	Socorro	LINEAR	·	8.8 km	MPC · JPL
65128	2002 CN_{65}	—	February 6, 2002	Socorro	LINEAR	·	6.6 km	MPC · JPL
65129	2002 CO_{73}	—	February 7, 2002	Socorro	LINEAR	HYG	6.3 km	MPC · JPL
65130	2002 CD_{86}	—	February 7, 2002	Socorro	LINEAR	·	4.7 km	MPC · JPL
65131	2002 CY_{88}	—	February 7, 2002	Socorro	LINEAR	·	4.5 km	MPC · JPL
65132	2002 CF_{91}	—	February 7, 2002	Socorro	LINEAR	·	4.3 km	MPC · JPL
65133	2002 CH_{94}	—	February 7, 2002	Socorro	LINEAR	KOR	2.7 km	MPC · JPL
65134	2002 CH_{96}	—	February 7, 2002	Socorro	LINEAR	L4	10 km	MPC · JPL
65135	2002 CH_{99}	—	February 7, 2002	Socorro	LINEAR	·	4.0 km	MPC · JPL
65136	2002 CF_{101}	—	February 7, 2002	Socorro	LINEAR	KOR	3.0 km	MPC · JPL
65137	2002 CQ_{103}	—	February 7, 2002	Socorro	LINEAR	·	2.1 km	MPC · JPL
65138	2002 CX_{103}	—	February 7, 2002	Socorro	LINEAR	·	3.8 km	MPC · JPL
65139	2002 CE_{104}	—	February 7, 2002	Socorro	LINEAR	V	1.4 km	MPC · JPL
65140	2002 CV_{104}	—	February 7, 2002	Socorro	LINEAR	·	3.8 km	MPC · JPL
65141	2002 CL_{108}	—	February 7, 2002	Socorro	LINEAR	·	12 km	MPC · JPL
65142	2002 CK_{111}	—	February 7, 2002	Socorro	LINEAR	·	3.8 km	MPC · JPL
65143	2002 CY_{112}	—	February 8, 2002	Socorro	LINEAR	THM	5.2 km	MPC · JPL
65144	2002 CO_{113}	—	February 8, 2002	Socorro	LINEAR	V	2.3 km	MPC · JPL
65145	2002 CG_{114}	—	February 8, 2002	Socorro	LINEAR	CYB	9.9 km	MPC · JPL
65146	2002 CT_{114}	—	February 8, 2002	Socorro	LINEAR	VER	8.2 km	MPC · JPL
65147	2002 CN_{116}	—	February 15, 2002	Uccle	E. W. Elst, H. Debehogne	EOS	4.3 km	MPC · JPL
65148	2002 CE_{117}	—	February 11, 2002	Fountain Hills	C. W. Juels, P. R. Holvorcem	·	2.9 km	MPC · JPL
65149	2002 CH_{122}	—	February 7, 2002	Socorro	LINEAR	·	2.9 km	MPC · JPL
65150	2002 CA_{126}	—	February 7, 2002	Socorro	LINEAR	L4 · ERY	20 km	MPC · JPL
65151	2002 CR_{127}	—	February 7, 2002	Socorro	LINEAR	THM	4.4 km	MPC · JPL
65152	2002 CU_{135}	—	February 8, 2002	Socorro	LINEAR	·	2.8 km	MPC · JPL
65153	2002 CK_{136}	—	February 8, 2002	Socorro	LINEAR	·	6.8 km	MPC · JPL
65154	2002 CH_{138}	—	February 8, 2002	Socorro	LINEAR	·	4.2 km	MPC · JPL
65155	2002 CP_{140}	—	February 8, 2002	Socorro	LINEAR	·	5.7 km	MPC · JPL
65156	2002 CG_{143}	—	February 9, 2002	Socorro	LINEAR	·	5.3 km	MPC · JPL
65157	2002 CB_{147}	—	February 9, 2002	Socorro	LINEAR	EOS	4.1 km	MPC · JPL
65158	2002 CT_{149}	—	February 10, 2002	Socorro	LINEAR	KOR	2.3 km	MPC · JPL
65159 Sprowls	2002 CN_{152}	Sprowls	February 14, 2002	Cordell-Lorenz	D. T. Durig	·	6.6 km	MPC · JPL
65160	2002 CB_{157}	—	February 7, 2002	Socorro	LINEAR	·	4.3 km	MPC · JPL
65161	2002 CX_{159}	—	February 8, 2002	Socorro	LINEAR	·	8.5 km	MPC · JPL
65162	2002 CF_{161}	—	February 8, 2002	Socorro	LINEAR	·	5.3 km	MPC · JPL
65163	2002 CJ_{161}	—	February 8, 2002	Socorro	LINEAR	EUN	3.0 km	MPC · JPL
65164	2002 CF_{162}	—	February 8, 2002	Socorro	LINEAR	·	4.8 km	MPC · JPL
65165	2002 CR_{163}	—	February 8, 2002	Socorro	LINEAR	EOS	4.6 km	MPC · JPL
65166	2002 CJ_{165}	—	February 8, 2002	Socorro	LINEAR	·	5.5 km	MPC · JPL
65167	2002 CJ_{166}	—	February 8, 2002	Socorro	LINEAR	·	3.6 km	MPC · JPL
65168	2002 CL_{166}	—	February 8, 2002	Socorro	LINEAR	·	2.2 km	MPC · JPL
65169	2002 CR_{167}	—	February 8, 2002	Socorro	LINEAR	·	7.6 km	MPC · JPL
65170	2002 CE_{170}	—	February 8, 2002	Socorro	LINEAR	(1118)	8.9 km	MPC · JPL
65171	2002 CB_{173}	—	February 8, 2002	Socorro	LINEAR	·	6.1 km	MPC · JPL
65172	2002 CQ_{174}	—	February 8, 2002	Socorro	LINEAR	·	2.7 km	MPC · JPL
65173	2002 CP_{203}	—	February 10, 2002	Socorro	LINEAR	·	3.9 km	MPC · JPL
65174	2002 CW_{207}	—	February 10, 2002	Socorro	LINEAR	L4	10 km	MPC · JPL
65175	2002 CC_{218}	—	February 10, 2002	Socorro	LINEAR	·	3.4 km	MPC · JPL
65176	2002 CL_{219}	—	February 10, 2002	Socorro	LINEAR	·	1.3 km	MPC · JPL
65177	2002 CW_{219}	—	February 10, 2002	Socorro	LINEAR	KOR	4.0 km	MPC · JPL
65178	2002 CX_{221}	—	February 10, 2002	Socorro	LINEAR	EOS · slow	4.9 km	MPC · JPL
65179	2002 CN_{224}	—	February 11, 2002	Socorro	LINEAR	L4	10 km	MPC · JPL
65180	2002 CV_{224}	—	February 11, 2002	Socorro	LINEAR	·	1.6 km	MPC · JPL
65181	2002 CB_{226}	—	February 3, 2002	Haleakala	NEAT	EOS	3.5 km	MPC · JPL
65182	2002 CV_{232}	—	February 10, 2002	Socorro	LINEAR	·	2.5 km	MPC · JPL
65183	2002 CU_{235}	—	February 8, 2002	Socorro	LINEAR	EOS	4.1 km	MPC · JPL
65184	2002 CD_{239}	—	February 11, 2002	Socorro	LINEAR	·	5.8 km	MPC · JPL
65185	2002 CF_{243}	—	February 11, 2002	Socorro	LINEAR	V	1.5 km	MPC · JPL
65186	2002 CH_{244}	—	February 11, 2002	Socorro	LINEAR	·	4.1 km	MPC · JPL
65187	2002 CJ_{246}	—	February 13, 2002	Kitt Peak	Spacewatch	KOR	3.3 km	MPC · JPL
65188	2002 CA_{247}	—	February 15, 2002	Socorro	LINEAR	·	2.7 km	MPC · JPL
65189	2002 CR_{247}	—	February 15, 2002	Socorro	LINEAR	·	4.2 km	MPC · JPL
65190	2002 CV_{247}	—	February 15, 2002	Socorro	LINEAR	·	7.6 km	MPC · JPL
65191 Janespencer	2002 CR_{257}	Janespencer	February 6, 2002	Kitt Peak	M. W. Buie	THM	6.8 km	MPC · JPL
65192	2002 CO_{261}	—	February 7, 2002	Haleakala	NEAT	·	5.2 km	MPC · JPL
65193	2002 CA_{263}	—	February 6, 2002	Socorro	LINEAR	·	8.3 km	MPC · JPL
65194	2002 CV_{264}	—	February 8, 2002	Socorro	LINEAR	L4	19 km	MPC · JPL
65195	2002 CD_{266}	—	February 7, 2002	Socorro	LINEAR	HYG	4.1 km	MPC · JPL
65196	2002 CF_{280}	—	February 7, 2002	Palomar	NEAT	EOS	3.2 km	MPC · JPL
65197	2002 CY_{282}	—	February 8, 2002	Socorro	LINEAR	·	1.4 km	MPC · JPL
65198	2002 CR_{286}	—	February 8, 2002	Kitt Peak	Spacewatch	THM	4.6 km	MPC · JPL
65199	2002 CP_{287}	—	February 9, 2002	Kitt Peak	Spacewatch	·	3.7 km	MPC · JPL
65200	2002 CL_{294}	—	February 10, 2002	Socorro	LINEAR	EOS ·	4.9 km	MPC · JPL

== 65201–65300 ==
back to top

Designation			Discovery			Properties		Ref
Permanent	Provisional	Named after	Date	Site	Discoverer(s)	Category	Diam.	Ref
65201	2002 CX_{294}	—	February 10, 2002	Socorro	LINEAR	EOS	4.4 km	MPC · JPL
65202	2002 CO_{304}	—	February 15, 2002	Socorro	LINEAR	·	2.4 km	MPC · JPL
65203	2002 DU	—	February 17, 2002	Needville	Needville	·	4.5 km	MPC · JPL
65204	2002 DQ_{12}	—	February 22, 2002	Palomar	NEAT	·	5.0 km	MPC · JPL
65205	2002 DW_{12}	—	February 24, 2002	Palomar	NEAT	L4	20 km	MPC · JPL
65206	2002 DB_{13}	—	February 24, 2002	Palomar	NEAT	L4	12 km	MPC · JPL
65207	2002 DY_{13}	—	February 16, 2002	Palomar	NEAT	·	4.5 km	MPC · JPL
65208	2002 DJ_{16}	—	February 19, 2002	Kitt Peak	Spacewatch	EOS	5.0 km	MPC · JPL
65209	2002 DB_{17}	—	February 20, 2002	Anderson Mesa	LONEOS	L4	20 km	MPC · JPL
65210 Stichius	2002 EG	Stichius	March 2, 2002	Uccle	E. W. Elst, H. Debehogne	L4	22 km	MPC · JPL
65211	2002 EK_{1}	—	March 6, 2002	Ondřejov	P. Kušnirák	L4	10 km	MPC · JPL
65212	2002 EU_{1}	—	March 5, 2002	Socorro	LINEAR	H	1.7 km	MPC · JPL
65213 Peterhobbs	2002 EC_{9}	Peterhobbs	March 12, 2002	Nogales	Tenagra II	·	7.6 km	MPC · JPL
65214	2002 EV_{12}	—	March 14, 2002	Desert Eagle	W. K. Y. Yeung	NYS	1.8 km	MPC · JPL
65215	2002 EX_{13}	—	March 3, 2002	Haleakala	NEAT	·	3.5 km	MPC · JPL
65216	2002 EZ_{13}	—	March 5, 2002	Palomar	NEAT	L4	20 km	MPC · JPL
65217	2002 EY_{16}	—	March 9, 2002	Socorro	LINEAR	L4	20 km	MPC · JPL
65218	2002 EJ_{20}	—	March 9, 2002	Socorro	LINEAR	·	1.9 km	MPC · JPL
65219	2002 EY_{21}	—	March 10, 2002	Haleakala	NEAT	EOS	5.0 km	MPC · JPL
65220	2002 EH_{22}	—	March 10, 2002	Haleakala	NEAT	·	6.7 km	MPC · JPL
65221	2002 ET_{22}	—	March 10, 2002	Haleakala	NEAT	·	3.6 km	MPC · JPL
65222	2002 EM_{29}	—	March 9, 2002	Socorro	LINEAR	NYS	1.9 km	MPC · JPL
65223	2002 EU_{34}	—	March 11, 2002	Palomar	NEAT	L4 · slow	20 km	MPC · JPL
65224	2002 EJ_{44}	—	March 13, 2002	Socorro	LINEAR	L4	16 km	MPC · JPL
65225	2002 EK_{44}	—	March 13, 2002	Socorro	LINEAR	L4 · ERY	17 km	MPC · JPL
65226	2002 EQ_{46}	—	March 11, 2002	Haleakala	NEAT	·	3.5 km	MPC · JPL
65227	2002 ES_{46}	—	March 11, 2002	Haleakala	NEAT	L4	14 km	MPC · JPL
65228	2002 EH_{58}	—	March 13, 2002	Socorro	LINEAR	L4	19 km	MPC · JPL
65229	2002 EE_{61}	—	March 13, 2002	Socorro	LINEAR	L4	16 km	MPC · JPL
65230	2002 ER_{71}	—	March 13, 2002	Socorro	LINEAR	HOF	5.6 km	MPC · JPL
65231	2002 ED_{74}	—	March 13, 2002	Socorro	LINEAR	NYS ·	3.8 km	MPC · JPL
65232	2002 EO_{87}	—	March 9, 2002	Socorro	LINEAR	L4	13 km	MPC · JPL
65233	2002 EW_{87}	—	March 9, 2002	Socorro	LINEAR	·	4.1 km	MPC · JPL
65234	2002 ET_{95}	—	March 14, 2002	Socorro	LINEAR	·	4.0 km	MPC · JPL
65235	2002 EG_{97}	—	March 11, 2002	Socorro	LINEAR	·	2.1 km	MPC · JPL
65236	2002 EW_{97}	—	March 12, 2002	Socorro	LINEAR	3:2	12 km	MPC · JPL
65237	2002 EY_{97}	—	March 12, 2002	Socorro	LINEAR	·	6.2 km	MPC · JPL
65238	2002 EZ_{97}	—	March 12, 2002	Socorro	LINEAR	·	4.1 km	MPC · JPL
65239	2002 EV_{101}	—	March 6, 2002	Socorro	LINEAR	·	4.3 km	MPC · JPL
65240	2002 EU_{106}	—	March 9, 2002	Anderson Mesa	LONEOS	L4 · slow?	20 km	MPC · JPL
65241 Seeley	2002 EP_{110}	Seeley	March 9, 2002	Catalina	CSS	·	5.5 km	MPC · JPL
65242	2002 EW_{115}	—	March 10, 2002	Haleakala	NEAT	·	3.5 km	MPC · JPL
65243	2002 EP_{118}	—	March 10, 2002	Kitt Peak	Spacewatch	L4	13 km	MPC · JPL
65244 Ianwong	2002 ED_{126}	Ianwong	March 12, 2002	Anderson Mesa	LONEOS	HIL · 3:2	13 km	MPC · JPL
65245	2002 EH_{130}	—	March 12, 2002	Anderson Mesa	LONEOS	L4	20 km	MPC · JPL
65246	2002 EH_{146}	—	March 14, 2002	Palomar	NEAT	LIX	9.3 km	MPC · JPL
65247	2002 FR	—	March 18, 2002	Desert Eagle	W. K. Y. Yeung	·	4.2 km	MPC · JPL
65248	2002 FN_{4}	—	March 20, 2002	Desert Eagle	W. K. Y. Yeung	·	6.1 km	MPC · JPL
65249	2002 FF_{6}	—	March 20, 2002	Socorro	LINEAR	·	7.5 km	MPC · JPL
65250	2002 FT_{14}	—	March 16, 2002	Socorro	LINEAR	L4	12 km	MPC · JPL
65251	2002 FV_{14}	—	March 16, 2002	Socorro	LINEAR	MAS	1.4 km	MPC · JPL
65252	2002 FP_{24}	—	March 19, 2002	Palomar	NEAT	·	11 km	MPC · JPL
65253	2002 FO_{26}	—	March 20, 2002	Palomar	NEAT	·	8.1 km	MPC · JPL
65254	2002 FY_{26}	—	March 20, 2002	Socorro	LINEAR	EOS	5.6 km	MPC · JPL
65255	2002 FM_{31}	—	March 20, 2002	Palomar	NEAT	·	3.2 km	MPC · JPL
65256	2002 FP_{34}	—	March 20, 2002	Anderson Mesa	LONEOS	·	6.2 km	MPC · JPL
65257	2002 FU_{36}	—	March 23, 2002	Socorro	LINEAR	L4	23 km	MPC · JPL
65258	2002 FH_{37}	—	March 30, 2002	Palomar	NEAT	·	5.2 km	MPC · JPL
65259	2002 GP	—	April 3, 2002	Kvistaberg	Uppsala-DLR Asteroid Survey	·	4.5 km	MPC · JPL
65260	2002 GE_{2}	—	April 6, 2002	Emerald Lane	L. Ball	·	2.0 km	MPC · JPL
65261	2002 GC_{11}	—	April 15, 2002	Socorro	LINEAR	·	2.5 km	MPC · JPL
65262	2002 GU_{12}	—	April 14, 2002	Socorro	LINEAR	·	3.7 km	MPC · JPL
65263	2002 GA_{16}	—	April 15, 2002	Socorro	LINEAR	·	1.9 km	MPC · JPL
65264	2002 GW_{16}	—	April 15, 2002	Socorro	LINEAR	LIX ·	9.5 km	MPC · JPL
65265	2002 GY_{16}	—	April 15, 2002	Socorro	LINEAR	·	3.9 km	MPC · JPL
65266	2002 GL_{20}	—	April 14, 2002	Socorro	LINEAR	AEG	5.6 km	MPC · JPL
65267	2002 GR_{22}	—	April 14, 2002	Haleakala	NEAT	·	2.6 km	MPC · JPL
65268	2002 GP_{23}	—	April 15, 2002	Palomar	NEAT	NYS	2.0 km	MPC · JPL
65269	2002 GR_{34}	—	April 2, 2002	Palomar	NEAT	HYG	6.8 km	MPC · JPL
65270	2002 GC_{38}	—	April 3, 2002	Palomar	NEAT	(2076)	2.5 km	MPC · JPL
65271	2002 GD_{39}	—	April 4, 2002	Palomar	NEAT	·	3.5 km	MPC · JPL
65272	2002 GE_{41}	—	April 4, 2002	Haleakala	NEAT	·	7.5 km	MPC · JPL
65273	2002 GN_{45}	—	April 4, 2002	Palomar	NEAT	CYB	8.1 km	MPC · JPL
65274	2002 GM_{55}	—	April 5, 2002	Anderson Mesa	LONEOS	·	2.1 km	MPC · JPL
65275	2002 GN_{55}	—	April 5, 2002	Anderson Mesa	LONEOS	(2076)	1.8 km	MPC · JPL
65276	2002 GR_{78}	—	April 9, 2002	Socorro	LINEAR	·	1.9 km	MPC · JPL
65277	2002 GL_{80}	—	April 10, 2002	Socorro	LINEAR	·	1.3 km	MPC · JPL
65278	2002 GW_{101}	—	April 10, 2002	Socorro	LINEAR	·	7.5 km	MPC · JPL
65279	2002 GJ_{108}	—	April 11, 2002	Socorro	LINEAR	TEL	3.8 km	MPC · JPL
65280	2002 GK_{113}	—	April 11, 2002	Socorro	LINEAR	LIX	6.3 km	MPC · JPL
65281	2002 GM_{121}	—	April 10, 2002	Palomar	NEAT	L4	20 km	MPC · JPL
65282	2002 GW_{148}	—	April 14, 2002	Palomar	NEAT	·	1.6 km	MPC · JPL
65283	2002 GT_{172}	—	April 10, 2002	Socorro	LINEAR	·	2.4 km	MPC · JPL
65284	2002 HE_{1}	—	April 16, 2002	Socorro	LINEAR	·	4.6 km	MPC · JPL
65285	2002 HU_{1}	—	April 16, 2002	Socorro	LINEAR	AGN	2.6 km	MPC · JPL
65286	2002 HC_{8}	—	April 21, 2002	Reedy Creek	J. Broughton	·	1.8 km	MPC · JPL
65287	2002 HL_{11}	—	April 22, 2002	Palomar	NEAT	·	3.0 km	MPC · JPL
65288	2002 HW_{13}	—	April 21, 2002	Socorro	LINEAR	H	1.1 km	MPC · JPL
65289	2002 JX	—	May 3, 2002	Desert Eagle	W. K. Y. Yeung	·	4.8 km	MPC · JPL
65290	2002 JA_{4}	—	May 5, 2002	Socorro	LINEAR	HNS	3.0 km	MPC · JPL
65291	2002 JX_{11}	—	May 6, 2002	Anderson Mesa	LONEOS	·	2.0 km	MPC · JPL
65292	2002 JA_{15}	—	May 8, 2002	Socorro	LINEAR	·	2.6 km	MPC · JPL
65293	2002 JM_{18}	—	May 7, 2002	Palomar	NEAT	NYS ·	2.7 km	MPC · JPL
65294	2002 JJ_{22}	—	May 8, 2002	Socorro	LINEAR	GEF	3.4 km	MPC · JPL
65295	2002 JC_{24}	—	May 8, 2002	Socorro	LINEAR	·	3.9 km	MPC · JPL
65296	2002 JS_{25}	—	May 8, 2002	Socorro	LINEAR	EOS	3.9 km	MPC · JPL
65297	2002 JB_{31}	—	May 9, 2002	Socorro	LINEAR	CYB	6.2 km	MPC · JPL
65298	2002 JA_{39}	—	May 9, 2002	Palomar	NEAT	·	4.6 km	MPC · JPL
65299	2002 JZ_{41}	—	May 8, 2002	Socorro	LINEAR	·	1.8 km	MPC · JPL
65300	2002 JT_{44}	—	May 9, 2002	Socorro	LINEAR	·	9.3 km	MPC · JPL

== 65301–65400 ==
back to top

Designation			Discovery			Properties		Ref
Permanent	Provisional	Named after	Date	Site	Discoverer(s)	Category	Diam.	Ref
65301	2002 JP_{48}	—	May 9, 2002	Socorro	LINEAR	NYS	2.3 km	MPC · JPL
65302	2002 JB_{49}	—	May 9, 2002	Socorro	LINEAR	·	7.2 km	MPC · JPL
65303	2002 JP_{52}	—	May 9, 2002	Socorro	LINEAR	·	2.0 km	MPC · JPL
65304	2002 JT_{52}	—	May 9, 2002	Socorro	LINEAR	·	2.6 km	MPC · JPL
65305	2002 JC_{60}	—	May 9, 2002	Socorro	LINEAR	NYS	1.7 km	MPC · JPL
65306	2002 JL_{63}	—	May 9, 2002	Socorro	LINEAR	NYS ·	3.8 km	MPC · JPL
65307	2002 JD_{64}	—	May 9, 2002	Socorro	LINEAR	·	6.5 km	MPC · JPL
65308	2002 JC_{65}	—	May 9, 2002	Socorro	LINEAR	·	2.3 km	MPC · JPL
65309	2002 JZ_{66}	—	May 10, 2002	Socorro	LINEAR	·	1.6 km	MPC · JPL
65310	2002 JL_{70}	—	May 7, 2002	Socorro	LINEAR	GEF	2.8 km	MPC · JPL
65311	2002 JZ_{75}	—	May 11, 2002	Socorro	LINEAR	·	8.8 km	MPC · JPL
65312	2002 JP_{76}	—	May 11, 2002	Socorro	LINEAR	MRX	2.8 km	MPC · JPL
65313	2002 JB_{80}	—	May 11, 2002	Socorro	LINEAR	·	3.7 km	MPC · JPL
65314	2002 JM_{80}	—	May 11, 2002	Socorro	LINEAR	THM	3.4 km	MPC · JPL
65315	2002 JE_{102}	—	May 9, 2002	Socorro	LINEAR	HYG	7.3 km	MPC · JPL
65316	2002 JG_{103}	—	May 10, 2002	Socorro	LINEAR	NYS	2.3 km	MPC · JPL
65317	2002 JY_{103}	—	May 10, 2002	Socorro	LINEAR	·	1.7 km	MPC · JPL
65318	2002 JH_{107}	—	May 11, 2002	Palomar	NEAT	·	1.9 km	MPC · JPL
65319	2002 JJ_{127}	—	May 7, 2002	Anderson Mesa	LONEOS	·	6.6 km	MPC · JPL
65320	2002 JX_{128}	—	May 8, 2002	Anderson Mesa	LONEOS	·	3.6 km	MPC · JPL
65321	2002 JD_{133}	—	May 9, 2002	Socorro	LINEAR	EOS	3.9 km	MPC · JPL
65322	2002 KS	—	May 16, 2002	Haleakala	NEAT	·	7.8 km	MPC · JPL
65323	2002 KR_{4}	—	May 16, 2002	Socorro	LINEAR	·	3.6 km	MPC · JPL
65324	2002 LA_{11}	—	June 5, 2002	Socorro	LINEAR	·	2.0 km	MPC · JPL
65325	2002 LO_{18}	—	June 6, 2002	Socorro	LINEAR	·	4.2 km	MPC · JPL
65326	2002 LZ_{18}	—	June 6, 2002	Socorro	LINEAR	·	5.2 km	MPC · JPL
65327	2002 LV_{20}	—	June 6, 2002	Socorro	LINEAR	·	1.6 km	MPC · JPL
65328	2002 LU_{23}	—	June 8, 2002	Socorro	LINEAR	·	3.0 km	MPC · JPL
65329	2002 LX_{31}	—	June 8, 2002	Socorro	LINEAR	·	5.4 km	MPC · JPL
65330	2002 LR_{33}	—	June 5, 2002	Palomar	NEAT	·	7.8 km	MPC · JPL
65331	2002 LW_{35}	—	June 9, 2002	Socorro	LINEAR	·	7.4 km	MPC · JPL
65332	2002 LM_{44}	—	June 4, 2002	Palomar	NEAT	·	3.9 km	MPC · JPL
65333	2002 LZ_{53}	—	June 10, 2002	Palomar	NEAT	·	5.9 km	MPC · JPL
65334	2002 LF_{57}	—	June 10, 2002	Palomar	NEAT	·	1.8 km	MPC · JPL
65335	2002 LR_{58}	—	June 3, 2002	Socorro	LINEAR	·	2.3 km	MPC · JPL
65336	2002 LS_{58}	—	June 3, 2002	Socorro	LINEAR	·	6.6 km	MPC · JPL
65337	2002 MD_{4}	—	June 17, 2002	Palomar	NEAT	·	2.4 km	MPC · JPL
65338	2002 NH_{1}	—	July 4, 2002	Palomar	NEAT	·	2.2 km	MPC · JPL
65339	2002 NJ_{2}	—	July 4, 2002	Palomar	NEAT	EOS	5.4 km	MPC · JPL
65340	2002 NR_{11}	—	July 4, 2002	Palomar	NEAT	·	2.5 km	MPC · JPL
65341	2002 NC_{13}	—	July 4, 2002	Palomar	NEAT	·	2.1 km	MPC · JPL
65342	2002 NL_{13}	—	July 4, 2002	Palomar	NEAT	·	3.7 km	MPC · JPL
65343	2002 NO_{16}	—	July 5, 2002	Socorro	LINEAR	NEM	4.7 km	MPC · JPL
65344	2002 NL_{18}	—	July 9, 2002	Socorro	LINEAR	·	1.8 km	MPC · JPL
65345	2002 NF_{19}	—	July 9, 2002	Socorro	LINEAR	V	1.8 km	MPC · JPL
65346	2002 NC_{20}	—	July 9, 2002	Socorro	LINEAR	·	2.1 km	MPC · JPL
65347	2002 NR_{20}	—	July 9, 2002	Socorro	LINEAR	·	2.4 km	MPC · JPL
65348	2002 NU_{25}	—	July 9, 2002	Socorro	LINEAR	·	2.0 km	MPC · JPL
65349	2002 NR_{26}	—	July 9, 2002	Socorro	LINEAR	·	1.0 km	MPC · JPL
65350	2002 NG_{34}	—	July 14, 2002	Palomar	NEAT	·	7.8 km	MPC · JPL
65351	2002 ND_{37}	—	July 9, 2002	Socorro	LINEAR	·	2.4 km	MPC · JPL
65352	2002 NJ_{40}	—	July 14, 2002	Palomar	NEAT	THM	7.1 km	MPC · JPL
65353	2002 NR_{40}	—	July 14, 2002	Palomar	NEAT	THM	3.8 km	MPC · JPL
65354	2002 NG_{43}	—	July 15, 2002	Palomar	NEAT	·	3.6 km	MPC · JPL
65355	2002 NH_{52}	—	July 14, 2002	Palomar	NEAT	NYS	1.8 km	MPC · JPL
65356	2002 NE_{54}	—	July 5, 2002	Socorro	LINEAR	·	1.5 km	MPC · JPL
65357 Antoniucci	2002 NR_{55}	Antoniucci	July 12, 2002	Campo Imperatore	CINEOS	·	2.6 km	MPC · JPL
65358	2002 OS	—	July 17, 2002	Socorro	LINEAR	·	2.7 km	MPC · JPL
65359	2002 ON_{10}	—	July 22, 2002	Palomar	NEAT	·	3.3 km	MPC · JPL
65360	2002 OE_{11}	—	July 22, 2002	Palomar	NEAT	DOR	7.4 km	MPC · JPL
65361	2002 OO_{16}	—	July 18, 2002	Socorro	LINEAR	·	5.1 km	MPC · JPL
65362	2002 OG_{22}	—	July 22, 2002	Palomar	NEAT	·	3.3 km	MPC · JPL
65363 Ruthanna	2002 PQ_{11}	Ruthanna	August 7, 2002	Needville	J. Dellinger	NYS	2.3 km	MPC · JPL
65364	2002 PG_{16}	—	August 6, 2002	Palomar	NEAT	·	4.3 km	MPC · JPL
65365	2002 PD_{24}	—	August 6, 2002	Palomar	NEAT	KOR	2.5 km	MPC · JPL
65366	2002 PF_{26}	—	August 6, 2002	Palomar	NEAT	·	1.8 km	MPC · JPL
65367	2002 PR_{29}	—	August 6, 2002	Palomar	NEAT	·	2.3 km	MPC · JPL
65368	2002 PB_{41}	—	August 4, 2002	Socorro	LINEAR	·	1.5 km	MPC · JPL
65369	2002 PL_{44}	—	August 5, 2002	Socorro	LINEAR	·	4.5 km	MPC · JPL
65370	2002 PS_{44}	—	August 5, 2002	Socorro	LINEAR	·	4.9 km	MPC · JPL
65371	2002 PB_{46}	—	August 9, 2002	Socorro	LINEAR	·	4.2 km	MPC · JPL
65372	2002 PX_{46}	—	August 9, 2002	Socorro	LINEAR	·	2.1 km	MPC · JPL
65373	2002 PC_{52}	—	August 8, 2002	Palomar	NEAT	·	7.1 km	MPC · JPL
65374	2002 PP_{55}	—	August 9, 2002	Socorro	LINEAR	T_{j} (2.97) · HIL · 3:2 · (6124)	16 km	MPC · JPL
65375	2002 PM_{56}	—	August 9, 2002	Socorro	LINEAR	·	4.0 km	MPC · JPL
65376	2002 PM_{63}	—	August 11, 2002	Palomar	NEAT	·	4.1 km	MPC · JPL
65377	2002 PT_{63}	—	August 12, 2002	Reedy Creek	J. Broughton	·	3.4 km	MPC · JPL
65378	2002 PD_{82}	—	August 9, 2002	Socorro	LINEAR	·	7.2 km	MPC · JPL
65379	2002 PL_{83}	—	August 10, 2002	Socorro	LINEAR	·	1.5 km	MPC · JPL
65380	2002 PQ_{97}	—	August 14, 2002	Socorro	LINEAR	·	3.8 km	MPC · JPL
65381	2002 PP_{121}	—	August 13, 2002	Anderson Mesa	LONEOS	·	3.8 km	MPC · JPL
65382	2002 PN_{127}	—	August 14, 2002	Socorro	LINEAR	·	4.5 km	MPC · JPL
65383	2002 PN_{129}	—	August 15, 2002	Palomar	NEAT	KOR	2.3 km	MPC · JPL
65384	2002 PC_{136}	—	August 14, 2002	Socorro	LINEAR	·	2.6 km	MPC · JPL
65385	2002 QW	—	August 16, 2002	Kitt Peak	Spacewatch	·	1.7 km	MPC · JPL
65386	2002 QS_{6}	—	August 20, 2002	Kvistaberg	Uppsala-DLR Asteroid Survey	·	6.6 km	MPC · JPL
65387	2002 QM_{42}	—	August 30, 2002	Palomar	NEAT	HYG	5.0 km	MPC · JPL
65388	2002 QF_{47}	—	August 30, 2002	Anderson Mesa	LONEOS	·	4.9 km	MPC · JPL
65389	2002 RF_{12}	—	September 4, 2002	Anderson Mesa	LONEOS	3:2 · SHU	9.9 km	MPC · JPL
65390	2002 RA_{13}	—	September 4, 2002	Anderson Mesa	LONEOS	·	1.5 km	MPC · JPL
65391	2002 RJ_{25}	—	September 4, 2002	Anderson Mesa	LONEOS	·	6.3 km	MPC · JPL
65392	2002 RH_{28}	—	September 5, 2002	Anderson Mesa	LONEOS	V	1.6 km	MPC · JPL
65393	2002 RG_{29}	—	September 3, 2002	Haleakala	NEAT	·	3.5 km	MPC · JPL
65394	2002 RC_{62}	—	September 5, 2002	Socorro	LINEAR	·	3.6 km	MPC · JPL
65395	2002 RY_{63}	—	September 5, 2002	Socorro	LINEAR	·	4.4 km	MPC · JPL
65396	2002 RQ_{69}	—	September 4, 2002	Anderson Mesa	LONEOS	·	3.5 km	MPC · JPL
65397	2002 RL_{71}	—	September 5, 2002	Anderson Mesa	LONEOS	·	1.6 km	MPC · JPL
65398	2002 RP_{72}	—	September 5, 2002	Socorro	LINEAR	·	4.6 km	MPC · JPL
65399	2002 RR_{79}	—	September 5, 2002	Socorro	LINEAR	·	4.5 km	MPC · JPL
65400	2002 RJ_{83}	—	September 5, 2002	Socorro	LINEAR	·	5.0 km	MPC · JPL

== 65401–65500 ==
back to top

Designation			Discovery			Properties		Ref
Permanent	Provisional	Named after	Date	Site	Discoverer(s)	Category	Diam.	Ref
65401	2002 RX_{86}	—	September 5, 2002	Socorro	LINEAR	·	2.3 km	MPC · JPL
65402	2002 RU_{92}	—	September 5, 2002	Socorro	LINEAR	·	2.5 km	MPC · JPL
65403	2002 RO_{94}	—	September 5, 2002	Socorro	LINEAR	·	3.7 km	MPC · JPL
65404	2002 RX_{104}	—	September 5, 2002	Socorro	LINEAR	·	4.3 km	MPC · JPL
65405	2002 RY_{105}	—	September 5, 2002	Socorro	LINEAR	·	4.5 km	MPC · JPL
65406	2002 RS_{112}	—	September 7, 2002	Socorro	LINEAR	·	3.4 km	MPC · JPL
65407	2002 RP_{120}	—	September 4, 2002	Anderson Mesa	LONEOS	damocloid · critical · unusual · slow	15 km	MPC · JPL
65408	2002 RM_{136}	—	September 11, 2002	Haleakala	NEAT	·	4.1 km	MPC · JPL
65409	2002 RM_{212}	—	September 15, 2002	Haleakala	NEAT	CYB	7.5 km	MPC · JPL
65410	2002 ST_{16}	—	September 27, 2002	Palomar	NEAT	·	4.4 km	MPC · JPL
65411	2002 SH_{30}	—	September 28, 2002	Haleakala	NEAT	·	2.0 km	MPC · JPL
65412	2002 SS_{47}	—	September 30, 2002	Socorro	LINEAR	·	3.6 km	MPC · JPL
65413	2002 TB_{28}	—	October 2, 2002	Socorro	LINEAR	THM	4.6 km	MPC · JPL
65414	2002 TE_{30}	—	October 2, 2002	Socorro	LINEAR	KOR	2.8 km	MPC · JPL
65415	2002 TW_{39}	—	October 2, 2002	Socorro	LINEAR	·	2.5 km	MPC · JPL
65416	2002 TK_{40}	—	October 2, 2002	Socorro	LINEAR	·	4.2 km	MPC · JPL
65417	2002 TG_{44}	—	October 2, 2002	Socorro	LINEAR	ERI	3.0 km	MPC · JPL
65418	2002 TC_{47}	—	October 2, 2002	Socorro	LINEAR	·	3.3 km	MPC · JPL
65419	2002 TB_{50}	—	October 2, 2002	Socorro	LINEAR	·	2.4 km	MPC · JPL
65420	2002 TF_{51}	—	October 2, 2002	Socorro	LINEAR	·	2.0 km	MPC · JPL
65421	2002 TG_{75}	—	October 1, 2002	Anderson Mesa	LONEOS	·	3.1 km	MPC · JPL
65422	2002 TL_{79}	—	October 1, 2002	Socorro	LINEAR	PHO	2.9 km	MPC · JPL
65423	2002 TL_{89}	—	October 3, 2002	Palomar	NEAT	·	5.0 km	MPC · JPL
65424	2002 TO_{111}	—	October 3, 2002	Socorro	LINEAR	·	9.2 km	MPC · JPL
65425	2002 TL_{129}	—	October 4, 2002	Palomar	NEAT	·	1.5 km	MPC · JPL
65426	2002 TS_{135}	—	October 4, 2002	Socorro	LINEAR	·	3.3 km	MPC · JPL
65427	2002 TU_{168}	—	October 3, 2002	Socorro	LINEAR	·	2.1 km	MPC · JPL
65428	2002 TY_{176}	—	October 5, 2002	Socorro	LINEAR	EUN	5.2 km	MPC · JPL
65429	2002 TV_{177}	—	October 11, 2002	Palomar	NEAT	·	4.5 km	MPC · JPL
65430	2002 TK_{180}	—	October 14, 2002	Socorro	LINEAR	PHO	3.0 km	MPC · JPL
65431	2002 TC_{198}	—	October 4, 2002	Socorro	LINEAR	·	5.4 km	MPC · JPL
65432	2002 TH_{209}	—	October 6, 2002	Socorro	LINEAR	·	1.5 km	MPC · JPL
65433	2002 TX_{238}	—	October 7, 2002	Socorro	LINEAR	·	2.7 km	MPC · JPL
65434	2002 TD_{243}	—	October 9, 2002	Anderson Mesa	LONEOS	·	6.2 km	MPC · JPL
65435	2002 TQ_{253}	—	October 8, 2002	Anderson Mesa	LONEOS	·	1.4 km	MPC · JPL
65436	2002 TJ_{261}	—	October 9, 2002	Socorro	LINEAR	·	2.3 km	MPC · JPL
65437	2002 TM_{275}	—	October 9, 2002	Socorro	LINEAR	MRX	2.1 km	MPC · JPL
65438	2002 TA_{280}	—	October 10, 2002	Socorro	LINEAR	·	6.8 km	MPC · JPL
65439	2002 TV_{281}	—	October 10, 2002	Socorro	LINEAR	·	5.4 km	MPC · JPL
65440	2002 TF_{285}	—	October 10, 2002	Socorro	LINEAR	·	6.1 km	MPC · JPL
65441	2002 TF_{291}	—	October 10, 2002	Socorro	LINEAR	EUN	3.4 km	MPC · JPL
65442	2002 TV_{291}	—	October 10, 2002	Socorro	LINEAR	·	4.8 km	MPC · JPL
65443	2002 TR_{300}	—	October 15, 2002	Palomar	NEAT	EOS	3.8 km	MPC · JPL
65444	2002 UO_{29}	—	October 31, 2002	Palomar	NEAT	·	2.1 km	MPC · JPL
65445	2002 UK_{39}	—	October 31, 2002	Palomar	NEAT	·	2.4 km	MPC · JPL
65446	2002 VP_{25}	—	November 5, 2002	Socorro	LINEAR	·	5.0 km	MPC · JPL
65447	2002 VR_{34}	—	November 5, 2002	Socorro	LINEAR	·	5.3 km	MPC · JPL
65448	2002 VN_{35}	—	November 5, 2002	Kitt Peak	Spacewatch	THM	4.7 km	MPC · JPL
65449	2002 VS_{37}	—	November 4, 2002	Haleakala	NEAT	·	4.6 km	MPC · JPL
65450	2002 VX_{52}	—	November 6, 2002	Socorro	LINEAR	·	1.5 km	MPC · JPL
65451	2002 VL_{58}	—	November 6, 2002	Haleakala	NEAT	AGN	2.8 km	MPC · JPL
65452	2002 VZ_{65}	—	November 7, 2002	Socorro	LINEAR	·	3.7 km	MPC · JPL
65453	2002 VJ_{68}	—	November 7, 2002	Anderson Mesa	LONEOS	EOS	5.8 km	MPC · JPL
65454	2002 VD_{69}	—	November 8, 2002	Socorro	LINEAR	ADE	7.7 km	MPC · JPL
65455	2002 VC_{75}	—	November 7, 2002	Socorro	LINEAR	·	1.4 km	MPC · JPL
65456	2002 VW_{76}	—	November 7, 2002	Socorro	LINEAR	·	6.1 km	MPC · JPL
65457	2002 VQ_{78}	—	November 7, 2002	Socorro	LINEAR	·	5.2 km	MPC · JPL
65458	2002 VD_{102}	—	November 11, 2002	Socorro	LINEAR	·	2.2 km	MPC · JPL
65459	2002 WV_{7}	—	November 24, 2002	Palomar	NEAT	KOR	2.4 km	MPC · JPL
65460	2002 WU_{11}	—	November 27, 2002	Anderson Mesa	LONEOS	·	3.6 km	MPC · JPL
65461	2002 WU_{12}	—	November 28, 2002	Fountain Hills	Hills, Fountain	·	6.5 km	MPC · JPL
65462	2002 XB_{2}	—	December 1, 2002	Socorro	LINEAR	(5)	2.5 km	MPC · JPL
65463	2002 XD_{2}	—	December 1, 2002	Socorro	LINEAR	NYS ·	4.0 km	MPC · JPL
65464	2002 XN_{3}	—	December 2, 2002	Socorro	LINEAR	·	5.5 km	MPC · JPL
65465	2002 XQ_{20}	—	December 2, 2002	Socorro	LINEAR	AGN	2.7 km	MPC · JPL
65466	2002 XR_{21}	—	December 2, 2002	Socorro	LINEAR	·	2.8 km	MPC · JPL
65467	2002 XG_{26}	—	December 7, 2002	Socorro	LINEAR	NYS	3.2 km	MPC · JPL
65468	2002 XV_{27}	—	December 5, 2002	Socorro	LINEAR	·	2.6 km	MPC · JPL
65469	2002 XJ_{29}	—	December 5, 2002	Kitt Peak	Spacewatch	EOS	4.2 km	MPC · JPL
65470	2002 XC_{47}	—	December 8, 2002	Haleakala	NEAT	·	3.0 km	MPC · JPL
65471	2002 YT_{5}	—	December 27, 2002	Anderson Mesa	LONEOS	·	8.7 km	MPC · JPL
65472	2002 YJ_{7}	—	December 30, 2002	Socorro	LINEAR	V	1.8 km	MPC · JPL
65473	2002 YT_{23}	—	December 31, 2002	Socorro	LINEAR	·	4.0 km	MPC · JPL
65474	2003 AZ_{5}	—	January 1, 2003	Socorro	LINEAR	·	7.2 km	MPC · JPL
65475	2003 AB_{16}	—	January 4, 2003	Socorro	LINEAR	·	1.9 km	MPC · JPL
65476	2003 AU_{29}	—	January 4, 2003	Socorro	LINEAR	·	1.4 km	MPC · JPL
65477	2003 AX_{37}	—	January 7, 2003	Socorro	LINEAR	·	4.2 km	MPC · JPL
65478	2003 AW_{53}	—	January 5, 2003	Socorro	LINEAR	·	2.2 km	MPC · JPL
65479	2003 AP_{75}	—	January 10, 2003	Socorro	LINEAR	·	6.4 km	MPC · JPL
65480	2003 BP_{12}	—	January 26, 2003	Anderson Mesa	LONEOS	·	1.4 km	MPC · JPL
65481	2003 BW_{36}	—	January 28, 2003	Kitt Peak	Spacewatch	·	2.4 km	MPC · JPL
65482	2003 BH_{63}	—	January 28, 2003	Socorro	LINEAR	·	3.8 km	MPC · JPL
65483	2003 BD_{84}	—	January 31, 2003	Socorro	LINEAR	·	1.4 km	MPC · JPL
65484	2003 BL_{90}	—	January 30, 2003	Socorro	LINEAR	·	1.6 km	MPC · JPL
65485	2003 CK_{9}	—	February 2, 2003	Socorro	LINEAR	·	2.0 km	MPC · JPL
65486	2003 CJ_{19}	—	February 8, 2003	Socorro	LINEAR	NYS	2.0 km	MPC · JPL
65487 Divinacommedia	2003 CD_{20}	Divinacommedia	February 9, 2003	La Silla	G. Masi	·	3.0 km	MPC · JPL
65488	2003 DT_{8}	—	February 22, 2003	Palomar	NEAT	·	4.6 km	MPC · JPL
65489 Ceto	2003 FX_{128}	Ceto	March 22, 2003	Palomar	C. A. Trujillo, M. E. Brown	centaur · moon	223 km	MPC · JPL
65490	2062 P-L	—	September 24, 1960	Palomar	C. J. van Houten, I. van Houten-Groeneveld, T. Gehrels	·	3.8 km	MPC · JPL
65491	2084 P-L	—	September 24, 1960	Palomar	C. J. van Houten, I. van Houten-Groeneveld, T. Gehrels	·	1.6 km	MPC · JPL
65492	2104 P-L	—	September 24, 1960	Palomar	C. J. van Houten, I. van Houten-Groeneveld, T. Gehrels	EUP	8.2 km	MPC · JPL
65493	2119 P-L	—	September 24, 1960	Palomar	C. J. van Houten, I. van Houten-Groeneveld, T. Gehrels	V	1.4 km	MPC · JPL
65494	2123 P-L	—	September 24, 1960	Palomar	C. J. van Houten, I. van Houten-Groeneveld, T. Gehrels	VER	6.6 km	MPC · JPL
65495	2200 P-L	—	September 24, 1960	Palomar	C. J. van Houten, I. van Houten-Groeneveld, T. Gehrels	·	2.7 km	MPC · JPL
65496	2211 P-L	—	September 24, 1960	Palomar	C. J. van Houten, I. van Houten-Groeneveld, T. Gehrels	ERI	3.9 km	MPC · JPL
65497	2606 P-L	—	September 24, 1960	Palomar	C. J. van Houten, I. van Houten-Groeneveld, T. Gehrels	NYS ·	4.5 km	MPC · JPL
65498	2647 P-L	—	September 24, 1960	Palomar	C. J. van Houten, I. van Houten-Groeneveld, T. Gehrels	MAS	2.3 km	MPC · JPL
65499	2650 P-L	—	September 24, 1960	Palomar	C. J. van Houten, I. van Houten-Groeneveld, T. Gehrels	·	1.2 km	MPC · JPL
65500	2759 P-L	—	September 24, 1960	Palomar	C. J. van Houten, I. van Houten-Groeneveld, T. Gehrels	MAS	1.3 km	MPC · JPL

== 65501–65600 ==
back to top

Designation			Discovery			Properties		Ref
Permanent	Provisional	Named after	Date	Site	Discoverer(s)	Category	Diam.	Ref
65501	2766 P-L	—	September 24, 1960	Palomar	C. J. van Houten, I. van Houten-Groeneveld, T. Gehrels	NYS	1.5 km	MPC · JPL
65502	2856 P-L	—	September 24, 1960	Palomar	C. J. van Houten, I. van Houten-Groeneveld, T. Gehrels	·	9.2 km	MPC · JPL
65503	3028 P-L	—	September 24, 1960	Palomar	C. J. van Houten, I. van Houten-Groeneveld, T. Gehrels	·	4.4 km	MPC · JPL
65504	3544 P-L	—	October 17, 1960	Palomar	C. J. van Houten, I. van Houten-Groeneveld, T. Gehrels	·	3.7 km	MPC · JPL
65505	4085 P-L	—	September 24, 1960	Palomar	C. J. van Houten, I. van Houten-Groeneveld, T. Gehrels	EUN	2.8 km	MPC · JPL
65506	4102 P-L	—	September 24, 1960	Palomar	C. J. van Houten, I. van Houten-Groeneveld, T. Gehrels	·	2.3 km	MPC · JPL
65507	4151 P-L	—	September 24, 1960	Palomar	C. J. van Houten, I. van Houten-Groeneveld, T. Gehrels	·	1.7 km	MPC · JPL
65508	4179 P-L	—	September 24, 1960	Palomar	C. J. van Houten, I. van Houten-Groeneveld, T. Gehrels	HYG	5.9 km	MPC · JPL
65509	4186 P-L	—	September 24, 1960	Palomar	C. J. van Houten, I. van Houten-Groeneveld, T. Gehrels	·	2.3 km	MPC · JPL
65510	4241 P-L	—	September 24, 1960	Palomar	C. J. van Houten, I. van Houten-Groeneveld, T. Gehrels	NAE	5.5 km	MPC · JPL
65511	4243 P-L	—	September 24, 1960	Palomar	C. J. van Houten, I. van Houten-Groeneveld, T. Gehrels	EOS	4.4 km	MPC · JPL
65512	4246 P-L	—	September 24, 1960	Palomar	C. J. van Houten, I. van Houten-Groeneveld, T. Gehrels	·	7.2 km	MPC · JPL
65513	4258 P-L	—	September 24, 1960	Palomar	C. J. van Houten, I. van Houten-Groeneveld, T. Gehrels	V	1.6 km	MPC · JPL
65514	4270 P-L	—	September 24, 1960	Palomar	C. J. van Houten, I. van Houten-Groeneveld, T. Gehrels	·	2.6 km	MPC · JPL
65515	4712 P-L	—	September 24, 1960	Palomar	C. J. van Houten, I. van Houten-Groeneveld, T. Gehrels	NYS	3.1 km	MPC · JPL
65516	4726 P-L	—	September 24, 1960	Palomar	C. J. van Houten, I. van Houten-Groeneveld, T. Gehrels	NYS	2.2 km	MPC · JPL
65517	4759 P-L	—	September 24, 1960	Palomar	C. J. van Houten, I. van Houten-Groeneveld, T. Gehrels	THM	3.1 km	MPC · JPL
65518	4838 P-L	—	September 24, 1960	Palomar	C. J. van Houten, I. van Houten-Groeneveld, T. Gehrels	·	1.9 km	MPC · JPL
65519	4853 P-L	—	September 24, 1960	Palomar	C. J. van Houten, I. van Houten-Groeneveld, T. Gehrels	·	1.6 km	MPC · JPL
65520	4857 P-L	—	September 24, 1960	Palomar	C. J. van Houten, I. van Houten-Groeneveld, T. Gehrels	·	2.0 km	MPC · JPL
65521	4894 P-L	—	September 24, 1960	Palomar	C. J. van Houten, I. van Houten-Groeneveld, T. Gehrels	NAE	4.9 km	MPC · JPL
65522	5570 P-L	—	October 22, 1960	Palomar	C. J. van Houten, I. van Houten-Groeneveld, T. Gehrels	·	8.6 km	MPC · JPL
65523	5578 P-L	—	September 24, 1960	Palomar	C. J. van Houten, I. van Houten-Groeneveld, T. Gehrels	·	4.2 km	MPC · JPL
65524	5585 P-L	—	October 22, 1960	Palomar	C. J. van Houten, I. van Houten-Groeneveld, T. Gehrels	·	4.1 km	MPC · JPL
65525	6052 P-L	—	September 24, 1960	Palomar	C. J. van Houten, I. van Houten-Groeneveld, T. Gehrels	·	3.4 km	MPC · JPL
65526	6075 P-L	—	September 24, 1960	Palomar	C. J. van Houten, I. van Houten-Groeneveld, T. Gehrels	·	1.5 km	MPC · JPL
65527	6099 P-L	—	September 24, 1960	Palomar	C. J. van Houten, I. van Houten-Groeneveld, T. Gehrels	·	4.0 km	MPC · JPL
65528	6118 P-L	—	September 24, 1960	Palomar	C. J. van Houten, I. van Houten-Groeneveld, T. Gehrels	·	7.6 km	MPC · JPL
65529	6200 P-L	—	September 24, 1960	Palomar	C. J. van Houten, I. van Houten-Groeneveld, T. Gehrels	(5)	3.5 km	MPC · JPL
65530	6216 P-L	—	September 24, 1960	Palomar	C. J. van Houten, I. van Houten-Groeneveld, T. Gehrels	V	1.3 km	MPC · JPL
65531	6296 P-L	—	September 24, 1960	Palomar	C. J. van Houten, I. van Houten-Groeneveld, T. Gehrels	·	6.5 km	MPC · JPL
65532	6389 P-L	—	September 24, 1960	Palomar	C. J. van Houten, I. van Houten-Groeneveld, T. Gehrels	·	4.5 km	MPC · JPL
65533	6592 P-L	—	September 24, 1960	Palomar	C. J. van Houten, I. van Houten-Groeneveld, T. Gehrels	·	6.7 km	MPC · JPL
65534	6711 P-L	—	September 24, 1960	Palomar	C. J. van Houten, I. van Houten-Groeneveld, T. Gehrels	KOR	2.8 km	MPC · JPL
65535	6773 P-L	—	September 24, 1960	Palomar	C. J. van Houten, I. van Houten-Groeneveld, T. Gehrels	NYS	2.5 km	MPC · JPL
65536	6826 P-L	—	September 24, 1960	Palomar	C. J. van Houten, I. van Houten-Groeneveld, T. Gehrels	·	5.9 km	MPC · JPL
65537	6855 P-L	—	September 24, 1960	Palomar	C. J. van Houten, I. van Houten-Groeneveld, T. Gehrels	(5)	2.1 km	MPC · JPL
65538	7561 P-L	—	October 17, 1960	Palomar	C. J. van Houten, I. van Houten-Groeneveld, T. Gehrels	·	4.0 km	MPC · JPL
65539	7562 P-L	—	October 17, 1960	Palomar	C. J. van Houten, I. van Houten-Groeneveld, T. Gehrels	·	3.6 km	MPC · JPL
65540	7628 P-L	—	October 17, 1960	Palomar	C. J. van Houten, I. van Houten-Groeneveld, T. Gehrels	·	5.5 km	MPC · JPL
65541 Kasbek	9593 P-L	Kasbek	October 17, 1960	Palomar	C. J. van Houten, I. van Houten-Groeneveld, T. Gehrels	2:1J (unstable)	10 km	MPC · JPL
65542	1143 T-1	—	March 25, 1971	Palomar	C. J. van Houten, I. van Houten-Groeneveld, T. Gehrels	·	2.4 km	MPC · JPL
65543	1223 T-1	—	March 25, 1971	Palomar	C. J. van Houten, I. van Houten-Groeneveld, T. Gehrels	·	3.7 km	MPC · JPL
65544	2233 T-1	—	March 25, 1971	Palomar	C. J. van Houten, I. van Houten-Groeneveld, T. Gehrels	·	5.3 km	MPC · JPL
65545	2235 T-1	—	March 25, 1971	Palomar	C. J. van Houten, I. van Houten-Groeneveld, T. Gehrels	·	1.9 km	MPC · JPL
65546	3256 T-1	—	March 26, 1971	Palomar	C. J. van Houten, I. van Houten-Groeneveld, T. Gehrels	·	3.3 km	MPC · JPL
65547	3337 T-1	—	March 26, 1971	Palomar	C. J. van Houten, I. van Houten-Groeneveld, T. Gehrels	·	5.5 km	MPC · JPL
65548	4311 T-1	—	March 26, 1971	Palomar	C. J. van Houten, I. van Houten-Groeneveld, T. Gehrels	(5) · fast	3.1 km	MPC · JPL
65549	4869 T-1	—	May 13, 1971	Palomar	C. J. van Houten, I. van Houten-Groeneveld, T. Gehrels	·	6.5 km	MPC · JPL
65550	1062 T-2	—	September 29, 1973	Palomar	C. J. van Houten, I. van Houten-Groeneveld, T. Gehrels	NYS	1.8 km	MPC · JPL
65551	1206 T-2	—	September 29, 1973	Palomar	C. J. van Houten, I. van Houten-Groeneveld, T. Gehrels	·	2.1 km	MPC · JPL
65552	1261 T-2	—	September 29, 1973	Palomar	C. J. van Houten, I. van Houten-Groeneveld, T. Gehrels	·	2.7 km	MPC · JPL
65553	1297 T-2	—	September 29, 1973	Palomar	C. J. van Houten, I. van Houten-Groeneveld, T. Gehrels	·	1.8 km	MPC · JPL
65554	1350 T-2	—	September 29, 1973	Palomar	C. J. van Houten, I. van Houten-Groeneveld, T. Gehrels	·	5.0 km	MPC · JPL
65555	1464 T-2	—	September 29, 1973	Palomar	C. J. van Houten, I. van Houten-Groeneveld, T. Gehrels	·	1.8 km	MPC · JPL
65556	1541 T-2	—	September 29, 1973	Palomar	C. J. van Houten, I. van Houten-Groeneveld, T. Gehrels	NYS	2.4 km	MPC · JPL
65557	1606 T-2	—	September 24, 1973	Palomar	C. J. van Houten, I. van Houten-Groeneveld, T. Gehrels	·	7.2 km	MPC · JPL
65558	1611 T-2	—	September 24, 1973	Palomar	C. J. van Houten, I. van Houten-Groeneveld, T. Gehrels	·	1.7 km	MPC · JPL
65559	2065 T-2	—	September 29, 1973	Palomar	C. J. van Houten, I. van Houten-Groeneveld, T. Gehrels	·	1.5 km	MPC · JPL
65560	2175 T-2	—	September 29, 1973	Palomar	C. J. van Houten, I. van Houten-Groeneveld, T. Gehrels	·	7.2 km	MPC · JPL
65561	2195 T-2	—	September 29, 1973	Palomar	C. J. van Houten, I. van Houten-Groeneveld, T. Gehrels	·	1.6 km	MPC · JPL
65562	2219 T-2	—	September 29, 1973	Palomar	C. J. van Houten, I. van Houten-Groeneveld, T. Gehrels	·	2.9 km	MPC · JPL
65563	2238 T-2	—	September 29, 1973	Palomar	C. J. van Houten, I. van Houten-Groeneveld, T. Gehrels	·	6.6 km	MPC · JPL
65564	2264 T-2	—	September 29, 1973	Palomar	C. J. van Houten, I. van Houten-Groeneveld, T. Gehrels	EOS	6.1 km	MPC · JPL
65565	2300 T-2	—	September 29, 1973	Palomar	C. J. van Houten, I. van Houten-Groeneveld, T. Gehrels	GEF	2.0 km	MPC · JPL
65566	3022 T-2	—	September 30, 1973	Palomar	C. J. van Houten, I. van Houten-Groeneveld, T. Gehrels	·	5.7 km	MPC · JPL
65567	3039 T-2	—	September 30, 1973	Palomar	C. J. van Houten, I. van Houten-Groeneveld, T. Gehrels	·	2.0 km	MPC · JPL
65568	3105 T-2	—	September 30, 1973	Palomar	C. J. van Houten, I. van Houten-Groeneveld, T. Gehrels	·	3.1 km	MPC · JPL
65569	3127 T-2	—	September 30, 1973	Palomar	C. J. van Houten, I. van Houten-Groeneveld, T. Gehrels	·	3.4 km	MPC · JPL
65570	3139 T-2	—	September 30, 1973	Palomar	C. J. van Houten, I. van Houten-Groeneveld, T. Gehrels	·	3.8 km	MPC · JPL
65571	3165 T-2	—	September 30, 1973	Palomar	C. J. van Houten, I. van Houten-Groeneveld, T. Gehrels	·	4.3 km	MPC · JPL
65572	3173 T-2	—	September 30, 1973	Palomar	C. J. van Houten, I. van Houten-Groeneveld, T. Gehrels	(2076)	1.6 km	MPC · JPL
65573	3203 T-2	—	September 30, 1973	Palomar	C. J. van Houten, I. van Houten-Groeneveld, T. Gehrels	·	2.2 km	MPC · JPL
65574	3229 T-2	—	September 30, 1973	Palomar	C. J. van Houten, I. van Houten-Groeneveld, T. Gehrels	MAS	1.8 km	MPC · JPL
65575	3245 T-2	—	September 30, 1973	Palomar	C. J. van Houten, I. van Houten-Groeneveld, T. Gehrels	EOS	3.6 km	MPC · JPL
65576	3277 T-2	—	September 30, 1973	Palomar	C. J. van Houten, I. van Houten-Groeneveld, T. Gehrels	·	2.0 km	MPC · JPL
65577	3324 T-2	—	September 25, 1973	Palomar	C. J. van Houten, I. van Houten-Groeneveld, T. Gehrels	EOS	4.2 km	MPC · JPL
65578	4137 T-2	—	September 29, 1973	Palomar	C. J. van Houten, I. van Houten-Groeneveld, T. Gehrels	·	4.5 km	MPC · JPL
65579	4173 T-2	—	September 29, 1973	Palomar	C. J. van Houten, I. van Houten-Groeneveld, T. Gehrels	V	1.4 km	MPC · JPL
65580	4181 T-2	—	September 29, 1973	Palomar	C. J. van Houten, I. van Houten-Groeneveld, T. Gehrels	·	5.9 km	MPC · JPL
65581	4275 T-2	—	September 29, 1973	Palomar	C. J. van Houten, I. van Houten-Groeneveld, T. Gehrels	·	1.7 km	MPC · JPL
65582	4362 T-2	—	September 30, 1973	Palomar	C. J. van Houten, I. van Houten-Groeneveld, T. Gehrels	HYG	5.0 km	MPC · JPL
65583 Theoklymenos	4646 T-2	Theoklymenos	September 30, 1973	Palomar	C. J. van Houten, I. van Houten-Groeneveld, T. Gehrels	L4	10 km	MPC · JPL
65584	5051 T-2	—	September 25, 1973	Palomar	C. J. van Houten, I. van Houten-Groeneveld, T. Gehrels	·	2.4 km	MPC · JPL
65585	5064 T-2	—	September 25, 1973	Palomar	C. J. van Houten, I. van Houten-Groeneveld, T. Gehrels	·	6.0 km	MPC · JPL
65586	5160 T-2	—	September 25, 1973	Palomar	C. J. van Houten, I. van Houten-Groeneveld, T. Gehrels	·	3.8 km	MPC · JPL
65587	1033 T-3	—	October 17, 1977	Palomar	C. J. van Houten, I. van Houten-Groeneveld, T. Gehrels	·	5.5 km	MPC · JPL
65588	1086 T-3	—	October 17, 1977	Palomar	C. J. van Houten, I. van Houten-Groeneveld, T. Gehrels	·	2.5 km	MPC · JPL
65589	1122 T-3	—	October 17, 1977	Palomar	C. J. van Houten, I. van Houten-Groeneveld, T. Gehrels	VER	6.9 km	MPC · JPL
65590 Archeptolemos	1305 T-3	Archeptolemos	October 17, 1977	Palomar	C. J. van Houten, I. van Houten-Groeneveld, T. Gehrels	L5	20 km	MPC · JPL
65591	2147 T-3	—	October 16, 1977	Palomar	C. J. van Houten, I. van Houten-Groeneveld, T. Gehrels	·	2.7 km	MPC · JPL
65592	2155 T-3	—	October 16, 1977	Palomar	C. J. van Houten, I. van Houten-Groeneveld, T. Gehrels	·	7.5 km	MPC · JPL
65593	2375 T-3	—	October 16, 1977	Palomar	C. J. van Houten, I. van Houten-Groeneveld, T. Gehrels	·	3.9 km	MPC · JPL
65594	2396 T-3	—	October 16, 1977	Palomar	C. J. van Houten, I. van Houten-Groeneveld, T. Gehrels	·	2.6 km	MPC · JPL
65595	2430 T-3	—	October 16, 1977	Palomar	C. J. van Houten, I. van Houten-Groeneveld, T. Gehrels	·	9.4 km	MPC · JPL
65596	3033 T-3	—	October 16, 1977	Palomar	C. J. van Houten, I. van Houten-Groeneveld, T. Gehrels	GEF	3.4 km	MPC · JPL
65597	3047 T-3	—	October 16, 1977	Palomar	C. J. van Houten, I. van Houten-Groeneveld, T. Gehrels	·	3.7 km	MPC · JPL
65598	3059 T-3	—	October 16, 1977	Palomar	C. J. van Houten, I. van Houten-Groeneveld, T. Gehrels	·	1.4 km	MPC · JPL
65599	3079 T-3	—	October 16, 1977	Palomar	C. J. van Houten, I. van Houten-Groeneveld, T. Gehrels	DOR	5.7 km	MPC · JPL
65600	3121 T-3	—	October 16, 1977	Palomar	C. J. van Houten, I. van Houten-Groeneveld, T. Gehrels	·	4.2 km	MPC · JPL

== 65601–65700 ==
back to top

Designation			Discovery			Properties		Ref
Permanent	Provisional	Named after	Date	Site	Discoverer(s)	Category	Diam.	Ref
65601	3159 T-3	—	October 16, 1977	Palomar	C. J. van Houten, I. van Houten-Groeneveld, T. Gehrels	·	3.8 km	MPC · JPL
65602	3192 T-3	—	October 16, 1977	Palomar	C. J. van Houten, I. van Houten-Groeneveld, T. Gehrels	·	1.9 km	MPC · JPL
65603	3229 T-3	—	October 16, 1977	Palomar	C. J. van Houten, I. van Houten-Groeneveld, T. Gehrels	·	3.2 km	MPC · JPL
65604	3235 T-3	—	October 16, 1977	Palomar	C. J. van Houten, I. van Houten-Groeneveld, T. Gehrels	V	1.4 km	MPC · JPL
65605	3245 T-3	—	October 16, 1977	Palomar	C. J. van Houten, I. van Houten-Groeneveld, T. Gehrels	NYS	2.5 km	MPC · JPL
65606	3315 T-3	—	October 16, 1977	Palomar	C. J. van Houten, I. van Houten-Groeneveld, T. Gehrels	·	4.1 km	MPC · JPL
65607	3360 T-3	—	October 16, 1977	Palomar	C. J. van Houten, I. van Houten-Groeneveld, T. Gehrels	THM	4.9 km	MPC · JPL
65608	3441 T-3	—	October 16, 1977	Palomar	C. J. van Houten, I. van Houten-Groeneveld, T. Gehrels	·	2.1 km	MPC · JPL
65609	3445 T-3	—	October 16, 1977	Palomar	C. J. van Houten, I. van Houten-Groeneveld, T. Gehrels	·	1.2 km	MPC · JPL
65610	3470 T-3	—	October 16, 1977	Palomar	C. J. van Houten, I. van Houten-Groeneveld, T. Gehrels	·	4.4 km	MPC · JPL
65611	3498 T-3	—	October 16, 1977	Palomar	C. J. van Houten, I. van Houten-Groeneveld, T. Gehrels	KOR	3.3 km	MPC · JPL
65612	3564 T-3	—	October 16, 1977	Palomar	C. J. van Houten, I. van Houten-Groeneveld, T. Gehrels	EOS	3.8 km	MPC · JPL
65613	3923 T-3	—	October 16, 1977	Palomar	C. J. van Houten, I. van Houten-Groeneveld, T. Gehrels	HOF	5.1 km	MPC · JPL
65614	4096 T-3	—	October 16, 1977	Palomar	C. J. van Houten, I. van Houten-Groeneveld, T. Gehrels	AGN	2.8 km	MPC · JPL
65615	4163 T-3	—	October 16, 1977	Palomar	C. J. van Houten, I. van Houten-Groeneveld, T. Gehrels	V	1.3 km	MPC · JPL
65616	4165 T-3	—	October 16, 1977	Palomar	C. J. van Houten, I. van Houten-Groeneveld, T. Gehrels	·	2.4 km	MPC · JPL
65617	4172 T-3	—	October 16, 1977	Palomar	C. J. van Houten, I. van Houten-Groeneveld, T. Gehrels	·	4.0 km	MPC · JPL
65618	4217 T-3	—	October 16, 1977	Palomar	C. J. van Houten, I. van Houten-Groeneveld, T. Gehrels	·	2.3 km	MPC · JPL
65619	4218 T-3	—	October 16, 1977	Palomar	C. J. van Houten, I. van Houten-Groeneveld, T. Gehrels	·	1.5 km	MPC · JPL
65620	4238 T-3	—	October 16, 1977	Palomar	C. J. van Houten, I. van Houten-Groeneveld, T. Gehrels	HOF	4.9 km	MPC · JPL
65621	4247 T-3	—	October 16, 1977	Palomar	C. J. van Houten, I. van Houten-Groeneveld, T. Gehrels	·	9.3 km	MPC · JPL
65622	4287 T-3	—	October 16, 1977	Palomar	C. J. van Houten, I. van Houten-Groeneveld, T. Gehrels	·	5.5 km	MPC · JPL
65623	4297 T-3	—	October 16, 1977	Palomar	C. J. van Houten, I. van Houten-Groeneveld, T. Gehrels	·	2.4 km	MPC · JPL
65624	4347 T-3	—	October 16, 1977	Palomar	C. J. van Houten, I. van Houten-Groeneveld, T. Gehrels	HOF	5.6 km	MPC · JPL
65625	4377 T-3	—	October 16, 1977	Palomar	C. J. van Houten, I. van Houten-Groeneveld, T. Gehrels	·	2.8 km	MPC · JPL
65626	5052 T-3	—	October 16, 1977	Palomar	C. J. van Houten, I. van Houten-Groeneveld, T. Gehrels	·	4.4 km	MPC · JPL
65627	5090 T-3	—	October 16, 1977	Palomar	C. J. van Houten, I. van Houten-Groeneveld, T. Gehrels	GEF	3.1 km	MPC · JPL
65628	5098 T-3	—	October 16, 1977	Palomar	C. J. van Houten, I. van Houten-Groeneveld, T. Gehrels	·	1.6 km	MPC · JPL
65629	5118 T-3	—	October 16, 1977	Palomar	C. J. van Houten, I. van Houten-Groeneveld, T. Gehrels	·	1.9 km	MPC · JPL
65630	5134 T-3	—	October 16, 1977	Palomar	C. J. van Houten, I. van Houten-Groeneveld, T. Gehrels	·	1.7 km	MPC · JPL
65631	5143 T-3	—	October 16, 1977	Palomar	C. J. van Houten, I. van Houten-Groeneveld, T. Gehrels	BRA	2.6 km	MPC · JPL
65632	5177 T-3	—	October 16, 1977	Palomar	C. J. van Houten, I. van Houten-Groeneveld, T. Gehrels	·	3.7 km	MPC · JPL
65633	5291 T-3	—	October 17, 1977	Palomar	C. J. van Houten, I. van Houten-Groeneveld, T. Gehrels	·	9.8 km	MPC · JPL
65634	5644 T-3	—	October 16, 1977	Palomar	C. J. van Houten, I. van Houten-Groeneveld, T. Gehrels	·	6.4 km	MPC · JPL
65635 Hirayamashin	1977 EA_{8}	Hirayamashin	March 12, 1977	Kiso	H. Kosai, K. Furukawa	MAR · slow	2.9 km	MPC · JPL
65636	1979 ME_{1}	—	June 24, 1979	Siding Spring	E. F. Helin, S. J. Bus	·	1.7 km	MPC · JPL
65637 Tsniimash	1979 VS_{2}	Tsniimash	November 14, 1979	Nauchnyj	L. V. Zhuravleva	H · slow	2.3 km	MPC · JPL
65638	1981 DN_{1}	—	February 28, 1981	Siding Spring	S. J. Bus	·	5.3 km	MPC · JPL
65639	1981 DS_{2}	—	February 28, 1981	Siding Spring	S. J. Bus	·	4.5 km	MPC · JPL
65640	1981 DY_{2}	—	February 28, 1981	Siding Spring	S. J. Bus	HNS	2.8 km	MPC · JPL
65641	1981 DR_{3}	—	February 28, 1981	Siding Spring	S. J. Bus	·	3.8 km	MPC · JPL
65642	1981 ES_{2}	—	March 2, 1981	Siding Spring	S. J. Bus	·	2.1 km	MPC · JPL
65643	1981 EH_{12}	—	March 1, 1981	Siding Spring	S. J. Bus	·	2.2 km	MPC · JPL
65644	1981 EO_{12}	—	March 1, 1981	Siding Spring	S. J. Bus	V	1.3 km	MPC · JPL
65645	1981 EG_{13}	—	March 1, 1981	Siding Spring	S. J. Bus	V	1.7 km	MPC · JPL
65646	1981 EE_{17}	—	March 1, 1981	Siding Spring	S. J. Bus	H	1.3 km	MPC · JPL
65647	1981 EZ_{28}	—	March 1, 1981	Siding Spring	S. J. Bus	PHO	2.9 km	MPC · JPL
65648	1981 ES_{32}	—	March 7, 1981	Siding Spring	S. J. Bus	·	2.0 km	MPC · JPL
65649	1981 ES_{33}	—	March 1, 1981	Siding Spring	S. J. Bus	·	3.1 km	MPC · JPL
65650	1981 EP_{35}	—	March 2, 1981	Siding Spring	S. J. Bus	V	1.7 km	MPC · JPL
65651	1981 EV_{35}	—	March 2, 1981	Siding Spring	S. J. Bus	·	6.1 km	MPC · JPL
65652	1981 ED_{41}	—	March 2, 1981	Siding Spring	S. J. Bus	NYS	1.3 km	MPC · JPL
65653	1981 EP_{44}	—	March 7, 1981	Siding Spring	S. J. Bus	·	1.7 km	MPC · JPL
65654	1981 ES_{47}	—	March 2, 1981	Siding Spring	S. J. Bus	·	1.9 km	MPC · JPL
65655	1981 EV_{47}	—	March 2, 1981	Siding Spring	S. J. Bus	·	3.5 km	MPC · JPL
65656	1981 RR_{1}	—	September 1, 1981	La Silla	H. Debehogne	·	3.6 km	MPC · JPL
65657 Hube	1982 QB_{4}	Hube	August 16, 1982	Siding Spring	Lowe, A.	·	7.0 km	MPC · JPL
65658 Gurnikovskaya	1982 UA_{6}	Gurnikovskaya	October 20, 1982	Nauchnyj	L. G. Karachkina	·	2.5 km	MPC · JPL
65659	1983 XE	—	December 1, 1983	Anderson Mesa	E. Bowell	·	4.4 km	MPC · JPL
65660	1985 PM_{1}	—	August 14, 1985	Caussols	CERGA	·	6.5 km	MPC · JPL
65661	1985 VB_{1}	—	November 1, 1985	La Silla	R. M. West	·	8.6 km	MPC · JPL
65662	1986 QD_{1}	—	August 26, 1986	La Silla	H. Debehogne	·	2.2 km	MPC · JPL
65663	1986 QC_{3}	—	August 29, 1986	La Silla	H. Debehogne	slow	3.5 km	MPC · JPL
65664	1986 RE_{5}	—	September 4, 1986	La Silla	H. Debehogne	·	3.2 km	MPC · JPL
65665	1986 RP_{5}	—	September 9, 1986	La Silla	H. Debehogne	·	11 km	MPC · JPL
65666	1987 RU	—	September 12, 1987	La Silla	H. Debehogne	·	2.5 km	MPC · JPL
65667	1987 SM_{5}	—	September 30, 1987	Brorfelde	P. Jensen	INA	9.4 km	MPC · JPL
65668	1988 AX_{1}	—	January 14, 1988	Kleť	A. Mrkos	·	6.6 km	MPC · JPL
65669	1988 CJ_{4}	—	February 13, 1988	La Silla	E. W. Elst	·	5.8 km	MPC · JPL
65670	1988 CS_{5}	—	February 13, 1988	La Silla	E. W. Elst	ADE	6.1 km	MPC · JPL
65671	1988 DE_{3}	—	February 22, 1988	Siding Spring	R. H. McNaught	·	3.2 km	MPC · JPL
65672 Merrick	1988 QD	Merrick	August 16, 1988	Palomar	C. S. Shoemaker, E. M. Shoemaker	·	1.9 km	MPC · JPL
65673	1988 RH_{4}	—	September 1, 1988	La Silla	H. Debehogne	·	5.7 km	MPC · JPL
65674	1988 SM	—	September 29, 1988	Siding Spring	M. Hartley	AMO +1km	790 m	MPC · JPL
65675 Mohr-Gruber	1989 AG_{6}	Mohr-Gruber	January 11, 1989	Tautenburg Observatory	F. Börngen	THM	7.6 km	MPC · JPL
65676	1989 CC_{3}	—	February 4, 1989	La Silla	E. W. Elst	TIR ·	12 km	MPC · JPL
65677	1989 EB_{1}	—	March 1, 1989	Yorii	M. Arai, H. Mori	·	16 km	MPC · JPL
65678	1989 SU_{2}	—	September 26, 1989	La Silla	E. W. Elst	·	1.6 km	MPC · JPL
65679	1989 UQ	—	October 26, 1989	Caussols	C. Pollas	ATE · PHA	920 m	MPC · JPL
65680	1990 EH_{1}	—	March 2, 1990	La Silla	E. W. Elst	·	4.6 km	MPC · JPL
65681	1990 EO_{1}	—	March 2, 1990	La Silla	E. W. Elst	·	2.0 km	MPC · JPL
65682	1990 QU_{2}	—	August 24, 1990	Palomar	H. E. Holt	·	1.7 km	MPC · JPL
65683	1990 QW_{5}	—	August 29, 1990	Palomar	H. E. Holt	·	4.9 km	MPC · JPL
65684	1990 QY_{5}	—	August 29, 1990	Palomar	H. E. Holt	EUN	5.9 km	MPC · JPL
65685 Behring	1990 TY_{1}	Behring	October 10, 1990	Tautenburg Observatory	F. Börngen, L. D. Schmadel	NEM	5.0 km	MPC · JPL
65686	1990 TN_{8}	—	October 14, 1990	Kleť	A. Mrkos	·	7.3 km	MPC · JPL
65687	1990 VO_{1}	—	November 12, 1990	Kushiro	S. Ueda, H. Kaneda	·	2.8 km	MPC · JPL
65688 Jarnac	1990 VD_{8}	Jarnac	November 13, 1990	Palomar	C. S. Shoemaker	·	6.5 km	MPC · JPL
65689	1990 WM_{4}	—	November 16, 1990	La Silla	E. W. Elst	·	1.8 km	MPC · JPL
65690	1991 DG	—	February 20, 1991	Siding Spring	R. H. McNaught	APO · PHA	550 m	MPC · JPL
65691	1991 PT_{10}	—	August 7, 1991	Palomar	H. E. Holt	·	5.2 km	MPC · JPL
65692 Trifu	1991 RH_{3}	Trifu	September 12, 1991	Tautenburg Observatory	L. D. Schmadel, F. Börngen	·	4.7 km	MPC · JPL
65693	1991 RO_{11}	—	September 4, 1991	La Silla	E. W. Elst	·	15 km	MPC · JPL
65694 Franzrosenzweig	1991 RX_{40}	Franzrosenzweig	September 10, 1991	Tautenburg Observatory	F. Börngen	·	3.8 km	MPC · JPL
65695	1991 SC_{3}	—	September 29, 1991	Kitt Peak	Spacewatch	V	1.4 km	MPC · JPL
65696 Pierrehenry	1991 TP_{15}	Pierrehenry	October 6, 1991	Palomar	Lowe, A.	·	4.2 km	MPC · JPL
65697 Paulandrew	1991 TU_{15}	Paulandrew	October 6, 1991	Palomar	Lowe, A.	·	3.0 km	MPC · JPL
65698 Emmarochelle	1991 TP_{16}	Emmarochelle	October 6, 1991	Palomar	Lowe, A.	·	2.2 km	MPC · JPL
65699	1991 VY_{5}	—	November 2, 1991	La Silla	E. W. Elst	·	3.1 km	MPC · JPL
65700	1991 VW_{6}	—	November 9, 1991	La Silla	E. W. Elst	·	6.2 km	MPC · JPL

== 65701–65800 ==
back to top

Designation			Discovery			Properties		Ref
Permanent	Provisional	Named after	Date	Site	Discoverer(s)	Category	Diam.	Ref
65701	1992 BY_{1}	—	January 30, 1992	La Silla	E. W. Elst	·	5.1 km	MPC · JPL
65702	1992 EK_{4}	—	March 1, 1992	La Silla	UESAC	·	1.4 km	MPC · JPL
65703	1992 EY_{4}	—	March 1, 1992	La Silla	UESAC	VER	6.4 km	MPC · JPL
65704	1992 ED_{16}	—	March 1, 1992	La Silla	UESAC	·	5.0 km	MPC · JPL
65705	1992 GH_{3}	—	April 4, 1992	La Silla	E. W. Elst	EUN	4.5 km	MPC · JPL
65706	1992 NA	—	July 1, 1992	Siding Spring	R. H. McNaught	AMO +1km	1.7 km	MPC · JPL
65707	1992 PY_{1}	—	August 8, 1992	Caussols	E. W. Elst	V	2.1 km	MPC · JPL
65708 Ehrlich	1992 RB_{1}	Ehrlich	September 4, 1992	Tautenburg Observatory	F. Börngen, L. D. Schmadel	NYS	4.6 km	MPC · JPL
65709	1992 RP_{1}	—	September 2, 1992	La Silla	E. W. Elst	·	6.6 km	MPC · JPL
65710	1992 RT_{1}	—	September 2, 1992	La Silla	E. W. Elst	·	2.8 km	MPC · JPL
65711	1992 RJ_{2}	—	September 2, 1992	La Silla	E. W. Elst	·	2.7 km	MPC · JPL
65712 Schneidmüller	1992 SJ_{17}	Schneidmüller	September 24, 1992	Tautenburg Observatory	L. D. Schmadel, F. Börngen	LIX	9.6 km	MPC · JPL
65713	1992 UQ_{1}	—	October 19, 1992	Kushiro	S. Ueda, H. Kaneda	·	4.3 km	MPC · JPL
65714	1992 VR	—	November 2, 1992	Kushiro	S. Ueda, H. Kaneda	·	6.2 km	MPC · JPL
65715	1992 WV_{1}	—	November 16, 1992	Kushiro	S. Ueda, H. Kaneda	·	3.6 km	MPC · JPL
65716 Ohkinohama	1993 BZ_{2}	Ohkinohama	January 25, 1993	Geisei	T. Seki	·	3.5 km	MPC · JPL
65717	1993 BX_{3}	—	January 31, 1993	Siding Spring	R. H. McNaught	AMO · APO · PHA	240 m	MPC · JPL
65718	1993 FL	—	March 23, 1993	Lake Tekapo	A. C. Gilmore, P. M. Kilmartin	·	1.4 km	MPC · JPL
65719	1993 FY_{17}	—	March 17, 1993	La Silla	UESAC	V	1.5 km	MPC · JPL
65720	1993 FN_{19}	—	March 17, 1993	La Silla	UESAC	·	1.7 km	MPC · JPL
65721	1993 FV_{28}	—	March 21, 1993	La Silla	UESAC	fast	2.0 km	MPC · JPL
65722	1993 FY_{35}	—	March 19, 1993	La Silla	UESAC	EUN · slow	5.3 km	MPC · JPL
65723	1993 FO_{45}	—	March 19, 1993	La Silla	UESAC	·	1.5 km	MPC · JPL
65724	1993 FV_{46}	—	March 19, 1993	La Silla	UESAC	·	3.4 km	MPC · JPL
65725	1993 FB_{52}	—	March 17, 1993	La Silla	UESAC	·	2.3 km	MPC · JPL
65726	1993 FL_{60}	—	March 19, 1993	La Silla	UESAC	·	6.7 km	MPC · JPL
65727	1993 FY_{70}	—	March 21, 1993	La Silla	UESAC	CYB	7.5 km	MPC · JPL
65728	1993 FD_{84}	—	March 26, 1993	Kitt Peak	Spacewatch	·	3.2 km	MPC · JPL
65729	1993 JQ	—	May 14, 1993	La Silla	E. W. Elst	·	5.0 km	MPC · JPL
65730	1993 LP_{1}	—	June 14, 1993	Siding Spring	R. H. McNaught	·	5.0 km	MPC · JPL
65731	1993 OH_{6}	—	July 20, 1993	La Silla	E. W. Elst	·	2.0 km	MPC · JPL
65732	1993 OJ_{10}	—	July 20, 1993	La Silla	E. W. Elst	BRA	3.3 km	MPC · JPL
65733	1993 PC	—	August 15, 1993	Kitt Peak	Spacewatch	APO	750 m	MPC · JPL
65734	1993 PU_{4}	—	August 15, 1993	Caussols	E. W. Elst	EOS	5.7 km	MPC · JPL
65735	1993 QY_{3}	—	August 18, 1993	Caussols	E. W. Elst	·	5.5 km	MPC · JPL
65736	1993 QH_{7}	—	August 20, 1993	La Silla	E. W. Elst	·	1.8 km	MPC · JPL
65737	1993 RE_{7}	—	September 15, 1993	La Silla	E. W. Elst	·	1.5 km	MPC · JPL
65738	1993 RE_{9}	—	September 14, 1993	La Silla	H. Debehogne, E. W. Elst	·	1.3 km	MPC · JPL
65739	1993 SG_{13}	—	September 16, 1993	La Silla	H. Debehogne, E. W. Elst	EOS	4.5 km	MPC · JPL
65740	1993 TO_{10}	—	October 15, 1993	Kitt Peak	Spacewatch	·	5.0 km	MPC · JPL
65741	1993 TB_{14}	—	October 9, 1993	La Silla	E. W. Elst	·	1.0 km	MPC · JPL
65742	1993 TY_{18}	—	October 9, 1993	La Silla	E. W. Elst	·	1.3 km	MPC · JPL
65743	1993 TY_{19}	—	October 9, 1993	La Silla	E. W. Elst	(2076)	1.7 km	MPC · JPL
65744	1993 TR_{23}	—	October 9, 1993	La Silla	E. W. Elst	·	3.8 km	MPC · JPL
65745	1993 TT_{31}	—	October 9, 1993	La Silla	E. W. Elst	·	1.4 km	MPC · JPL
65746	1993 TX_{34}	—	October 9, 1993	La Silla	E. W. Elst	THM	6.6 km	MPC · JPL
65747	1993 TE_{38}	—	October 9, 1993	La Silla	E. W. Elst	·	4.3 km	MPC · JPL
65748	1993 TS_{38}	—	October 9, 1993	La Silla	E. W. Elst	·	3.5 km	MPC · JPL
65749	1993 TT_{38}	—	October 9, 1993	La Silla	E. W. Elst	·	1.6 km	MPC · JPL
65750	1993 UV_{2}	—	October 20, 1993	Siding Spring	R. H. McNaught	H	1.2 km	MPC · JPL
65751	1994 BM_{2}	—	January 19, 1994	Kitt Peak	Spacewatch	·	2.4 km	MPC · JPL
65752	1994 CY_{10}	—	February 7, 1994	La Silla	E. W. Elst	·	3.8 km	MPC · JPL
65753	1994 CZ_{17}	—	February 8, 1994	La Silla	E. W. Elst	·	1.8 km	MPC · JPL
65754	1994 CP_{18}	—	February 8, 1994	La Silla	E. W. Elst	·	2.5 km	MPC · JPL
65755	1994 EW_{3}	—	March 8, 1994	Farra d'Isonzo	Farra d'Isonzo	·	1.8 km	MPC · JPL
65756	1994 EO_{4}	—	March 5, 1994	Kitt Peak	Spacewatch	·	2.7 km	MPC · JPL
65757	1994 FV	—	March 21, 1994	Siding Spring	G. J. Garradd	H	1.5 km	MPC · JPL
65758	1994 PG_{3}	—	August 10, 1994	La Silla	E. W. Elst	GEF	2.5 km	MPC · JPL
65759	1994 PA_{4}	—	August 10, 1994	La Silla	E. W. Elst	·	3.5 km	MPC · JPL
65760	1994 PD_{21}	—	August 12, 1994	La Silla	E. W. Elst	GEF	2.6 km	MPC · JPL
65761	1994 RA	—	September 1, 1994	Farra d'Isonzo	Farra d'Isonzo	·	4.1 km	MPC · JPL
65762	1994 RG	—	September 4, 1994	Stroncone	Santa Lucia	·	3.8 km	MPC · JPL
65763	1994 RC_{10}	—	September 12, 1994	Kitt Peak	Spacewatch	NYS	2.4 km	MPC · JPL
65764	1994 TH_{15}	—	October 13, 1994	Kiyosato	S. Otomo	·	5.0 km	MPC · JPL
65765	1994 UR_{1}	—	October 25, 1994	Kushiro	S. Ueda, H. Kaneda	NYS	4.1 km	MPC · JPL
65766	1994 WG_{1}	—	November 27, 1994	Oizumi	T. Kobayashi	GEF	4.0 km	MPC · JPL
65767	1995 BZ_{11}	—	January 29, 1995	Kitt Peak	Spacewatch	·	1.5 km	MPC · JPL
65768	1995 DR_{6}	—	February 24, 1995	Kitt Peak	Spacewatch	fast	7.2 km	MPC · JPL
65769 Mahalia	1995 EN_{8}	Mahalia	March 4, 1995	Tautenburg Observatory	F. Börngen	·	12 km	MPC · JPL
65770 Leonardotestoni	1995 KF_{1}	Leonardotestoni	May 28, 1995	Bologna	San Vittore	·	3.3 km	MPC · JPL
65771	1995 KQ_{3}	—	May 25, 1995	Kitt Peak	Spacewatch	V	1.3 km	MPC · JPL
65772	1995 MM_{1}	—	June 22, 1995	Kitt Peak	Spacewatch	·	3.5 km	MPC · JPL
65773	1995 OQ_{2}	—	July 22, 1995	Kitt Peak	Spacewatch	EOS	3.5 km	MPC · JPL
65774	1995 OW_{3}	—	July 22, 1995	Kitt Peak	Spacewatch	·	3.9 km	MPC · JPL
65775 Reikotosa	1995 SO_{2}	Reikotosa	September 18, 1995	Kuma Kogen	A. Nakamura	·	2.4 km	MPC · JPL
65776	1995 SW_{3}	—	September 20, 1995	Kitami	K. Endate, K. Watanabe	·	3.0 km	MPC · JPL
65777	1995 SW_{25}	—	September 19, 1995	Kitt Peak	Spacewatch	(5)	2.5 km	MPC · JPL
65778	1995 SD_{33}	—	September 21, 1995	Kitt Peak	Spacewatch	·	1.8 km	MPC · JPL
65779	1995 SV_{50}	—	September 26, 1995	Kitt Peak	Spacewatch	NYS	2.3 km	MPC · JPL
65780	1995 TM_{1}	—	October 14, 1995	Xinglong	SCAP	·	3.2 km	MPC · JPL
65781	1995 TT_{1}	—	October 14, 1995	Xinglong	SCAP	·	2.2 km	MPC · JPL
65782	1995 UG	—	October 16, 1995	Nachi-Katsuura	Y. Shimizu, T. Urata	·	3.1 km	MPC · JPL
65783	1995 UK	—	October 17, 1995	Yatsuka	H. Abe	·	1.8 km	MPC · JPL
65784 Naderayama	1995 UF_{4}	Naderayama	October 20, 1995	Nanyo	T. Okuni	·	1.8 km	MPC · JPL
65785 Carlafracci	1995 UC_{5}	Carlafracci	October 26, 1995	Colleverde	V. S. Casulli	WIT	2.2 km	MPC · JPL
65786	1995 UV_{8}	—	October 28, 1995	Kitami	K. Endate, K. Watanabe	·	5.0 km	MPC · JPL
65787	1995 UU_{14}	—	October 17, 1995	Kitt Peak	Spacewatch	NYS	2.6 km	MPC · JPL
65788	1995 UJ_{20}	—	October 19, 1995	Kitt Peak	Spacewatch	·	2.0 km	MPC · JPL
65789	1995 UB_{24}	—	October 19, 1995	Kitt Peak	Spacewatch	·	2.0 km	MPC · JPL
65790	1995 UT_{25}	—	October 20, 1995	Kitt Peak	Spacewatch	·	2.4 km	MPC · JPL
65791	1995 UE_{45}	—	October 28, 1995	Kitami	K. Endate, K. Watanabe	·	7.9 km	MPC · JPL
65792	1995 WJ_{1}	—	November 18, 1995	Oizumi	T. Kobayashi	(5)	3.1 km	MPC · JPL
65793	1995 WS_{3}	—	November 21, 1995	Kleť	Kleť	(5)	2.9 km	MPC · JPL
65794	1995 WG_{27}	—	November 18, 1995	Kitt Peak	Spacewatch	·	5.3 km	MPC · JPL
65795	1995 WQ_{27}	—	November 19, 1995	Kitt Peak	Spacewatch	THM	3.4 km	MPC · JPL
65796	1995 XK_{1}	—	December 15, 1995	Oizumi	T. Kobayashi	EUN	4.4 km	MPC · JPL
65797	1995 YL	—	December 19, 1995	Oizumi	T. Kobayashi	DOR	7.1 km	MPC · JPL
65798	1995 YR_{6}	—	December 16, 1995	Kitt Peak	Spacewatch	NYS	2.9 km	MPC · JPL
65799	1995 YB_{10}	—	December 18, 1995	Kitt Peak	Spacewatch	·	5.0 km	MPC · JPL
65800	1995 YH_{25}	—	December 19, 1995	Kitt Peak	Spacewatch	V	1.6 km	MPC · JPL

== 65801–65900 ==
back to top

Designation			Discovery			Properties		Ref
Permanent	Provisional	Named after	Date	Site	Discoverer(s)	Category	Diam.	Ref
65801	1996 AJ_{7}	—	January 12, 1996	Kitt Peak	Spacewatch	KOR	2.5 km	MPC · JPL
65802	1996 BA_{3}	—	January 27, 1996	Oizumi	T. Kobayashi	GEF	3.3 km	MPC · JPL
65803 Didymos	1996 GT	Didymos	April 11, 1996	Kitt Peak	Spacewatch	AMO · APO +1km · PHA · moon	780 m	MPC · JPL
65804	1996 HT_{6}	—	April 18, 1996	Kitt Peak	Spacewatch	·	3.7 km	MPC · JPL
65805	1996 HO_{14}	—	April 17, 1996	La Silla	E. W. Elst	·	3.6 km	MPC · JPL
65806	1996 HW_{18}	—	April 18, 1996	La Silla	E. W. Elst	NYS	3.0 km	MPC · JPL
65807	1996 JT_{9}	—	May 13, 1996	Kitt Peak	Spacewatch	·	3.7 km	MPC · JPL
65808	1996 LO_{1}	—	June 14, 1996	Haleakala	NEAT	·	1.6 km	MPC · JPL
65809	1996 RW_{15}	—	September 13, 1996	Kitt Peak	Spacewatch	V	1.0 km	MPC · JPL
65810	1996 RL_{26}	—	September 5, 1996	Bergisch Gladbach	W. Bickel	·	1.3 km	MPC · JPL
65811	1996 RW_{30}	—	September 13, 1996	La Silla	Uppsala-DLR Trojan Survey	L4	13 km	MPC · JPL
65812	1996 SG_{7}	—	September 30, 1996	Stroncone	A. Vagnozzi	THM	5.3 km	MPC · JPL
65813	1996 TT_{5}	—	October 7, 1996	Catalina Station	T. B. Spahr	PHO	2.4 km	MPC · JPL
65814	1996 TH_{8}	—	October 9, 1996	Haleakala	NEAT	HNS	3.3 km	MPC · JPL
65815	1996 TB_{18}	—	October 4, 1996	Kitt Peak	Spacewatch	·	3.6 km	MPC · JPL
65816	1996 TW_{28}	—	October 7, 1996	Kitt Peak	Spacewatch	V	1.2 km	MPC · JPL
65817	1996 TC_{33}	—	October 10, 1996	Kitt Peak	Spacewatch	·	1.8 km	MPC · JPL
65818	1996 TP_{39}	—	October 8, 1996	La Silla	E. W. Elst	NYS	2.7 km	MPC · JPL
65819	1996 TE_{40}	—	October 8, 1996	La Silla	E. W. Elst	·	5.4 km	MPC · JPL
65820	1996 TR_{40}	—	October 8, 1996	La Silla	E. W. Elst	·	2.0 km	MPC · JPL
65821 De Curtis	1996 UC_{3}	De Curtis	October 30, 1996	Colleverde	V. S. Casulli	3:2	13 km	MPC · JPL
65822	1996 VO_{5}	—	November 14, 1996	Oohira	T. Urata	·	3.1 km	MPC · JPL
65823	1996 VO_{10}	—	November 4, 1996	Kitt Peak	Spacewatch	·	2.3 km	MPC · JPL
65824	1996 VJ_{11}	—	November 4, 1996	Kitt Peak	Spacewatch	·	2.2 km	MPC · JPL
65825	1996 VF_{19}	—	November 7, 1996	Kitt Peak	Spacewatch	VER	4.7 km	MPC · JPL
65826	1996 VA_{28}	—	November 11, 1996	Kitt Peak	Spacewatch	·	6.4 km	MPC · JPL
65827	1996 VG_{32}	—	November 4, 1996	Kitt Peak	Spacewatch	·	7.9 km	MPC · JPL
65828	1996 VZ_{37}	—	November 1, 1996	Xinglong	SCAP	·	7.9 km	MPC · JPL
65829	1996 WS_{2}	—	November 26, 1996	Xinglong	SCAP	·	1.6 km	MPC · JPL
65830	1996 XA	—	December 1, 1996	Prescott	P. G. Comba	·	2.5 km	MPC · JPL
65831	1996 XQ_{4}	—	December 6, 1996	Kitt Peak	Spacewatch	·	2.9 km	MPC · JPL
65832	1996 XN_{5}	—	December 7, 1996	Oizumi	T. Kobayashi	NYS	2.5 km	MPC · JPL
65833	1996 XE_{6}	—	December 7, 1996	Oizumi	T. Kobayashi	EUN	4.6 km	MPC · JPL
65834	1996 XK_{7}	—	December 1, 1996	Kitt Peak	Spacewatch	NYS	2.6 km	MPC · JPL
65835	1996 XJ_{11}	—	December 2, 1996	Kitt Peak	Spacewatch	·	2.5 km	MPC · JPL
65836	1996 XS_{15}	—	December 10, 1996	Xinglong	SCAP	H	1.1 km	MPC · JPL
65837	1996 XX_{20}	—	December 5, 1996	Kitt Peak	Spacewatch	ERI	4.9 km	MPC · JPL
65838	1996 XD_{26}	—	December 8, 1996	Chichibu	N. Satō	·	2.6 km	MPC · JPL
65839	1996 XV_{28}	—	December 12, 1996	Kitt Peak	Spacewatch	NYS	2.3 km	MPC · JPL
65840	1997 AA_{4}	—	January 6, 1997	Oizumi	T. Kobayashi	·	3.0 km	MPC · JPL
65841	1997 AD_{9}	—	January 2, 1997	Kitt Peak	Spacewatch	·	3.0 km	MPC · JPL
65842	1997 AF_{14}	—	January 4, 1997	Xinglong	SCAP	BRG	4.7 km	MPC · JPL
65843	1997 AR_{15}	—	January 12, 1997	Haleakala	NEAT	·	5.2 km	MPC · JPL
65844	1997 AV_{15}	—	January 12, 1997	Haleakala	NEAT	H	1.6 km	MPC · JPL
65845	1997 AK_{22}	—	January 14, 1997	Campo Imperatore	A. Boattini, A. Di Paola	·	5.4 km	MPC · JPL
65846	1997 BT_{2}	—	January 30, 1997	Oizumi	T. Kobayashi	EUN	4.6 km	MPC · JPL
65847	1997 BH_{6}	—	January 31, 1997	Kitt Peak	Spacewatch	·	2.9 km	MPC · JPL
65848 Enricomari	1997 BP_{9}	Enricomari	January 30, 1997	Cima Ekar	M. Tombelli	·	4.2 km	MPC · JPL
65849	1997 CF_{9}	—	February 1, 1997	Kitt Peak	Spacewatch	·	3.7 km	MPC · JPL
65850	1997 CG_{28}	—	February 7, 1997	Xinglong	SCAP	·	4.8 km	MPC · JPL
65851	1997 EM_{2}	—	March 4, 1997	Modra	A. Galád, Pravda, A.	·	2.8 km	MPC · JPL
65852 Alle	1997 EX_{7}	Alle	March 7, 1997	Bologna	San Vittore	(5)	3.5 km	MPC · JPL
65853	1997 EV_{38}	—	March 5, 1997	Socorro	LINEAR	(13314)	5.5 km	MPC · JPL
65854	1997 EH_{46}	—	March 7, 1997	Bergisch Gladbach	W. Bickel	·	7.4 km	MPC · JPL
65855	1997 GQ_{5}	—	April 8, 1997	Kitt Peak	Spacewatch	·	7.3 km	MPC · JPL
65856	1997 GX_{11}	—	April 3, 1997	Socorro	LINEAR	EUN	2.7 km	MPC · JPL
65857	1997 GN_{17}	—	April 3, 1997	Socorro	LINEAR	·	1.9 km	MPC · JPL
65858	1997 GL_{35}	—	April 6, 1997	Socorro	LINEAR	·	2.1 km	MPC · JPL
65859 Mädler	1997 GF_{42}	Mädler	April 9, 1997	La Silla	E. W. Elst	3:2	14 km	MPC · JPL
65860	1997 HW_{7}	—	April 30, 1997	Socorro	LINEAR	·	5.1 km	MPC · JPL
65861	1997 JK_{4}	—	May 1, 1997	Socorro	LINEAR	·	2.5 km	MPC · JPL
65862	1997 JN_{11}	—	May 3, 1997	La Silla	E. W. Elst	·	3.5 km	MPC · JPL
65863	1997 KW_{1}	—	May 28, 1997	Kitt Peak	Spacewatch	·	4.3 km	MPC · JPL
65864 Claudepieplu	1997 OT	Claudepieplu	July 27, 1997	Caussols	ODAS	·	7.7 km	MPC · JPL
65865	1997 OQ_{1}	—	July 31, 1997	Kitt Peak	Spacewatch	PHO	3.7 km	MPC · JPL
65866 Wynneozrics	1997 PA_{4}	Wynneozrics	August 10, 1997	Rand	G. R. Viscome	EUP	17 km	MPC · JPL
65867	1997 QG_{5}	—	August 25, 1997	Reedy Creek	J. Broughton	·	6.0 km	MPC · JPL
65868	1997 RR_{5}	—	September 8, 1997	Prescott	P. G. Comba	·	2.9 km	MPC · JPL
65869	1997 SP_{17}	—	September 30, 1997	Nanyo	T. Okuni	·	3.1 km	MPC · JPL
65870	1997 UK_{9}	—	October 30, 1997	Haleakala	NEAT	PHO	2.3 km	MPC · JPL
65871	1997 UC_{22}	—	October 28, 1997	Xinglong	SCAP	LUT	19 km	MPC · JPL
65872	1997 VQ_{2}	—	November 1, 1997	Xinglong	SCAP	·	4.1 km	MPC · JPL
65873	1997 WD_{7}	—	November 24, 1997	Kitt Peak	Spacewatch	·	3.7 km	MPC · JPL
65874	1997 WL_{13}	—	November 24, 1997	Nachi-Katsuura	Y. Shimizu, T. Urata	DOR	7.2 km	MPC · JPL
65875	1997 WY_{14}	—	November 23, 1997	Kitt Peak	Spacewatch	·	3.3 km	MPC · JPL
65876	1997 WV_{28}	—	November 29, 1997	Kitt Peak	Spacewatch	·	3.0 km	MPC · JPL
65877	1997 XK_{1}	—	December 4, 1997	Oizumi	T. Kobayashi	·	3.2 km	MPC · JPL
65878	1997 XD_{10}	—	December 5, 1997	Oizumi	T. Kobayashi	·	2.0 km	MPC · JPL
65879	1997 YC_{2}	—	December 21, 1997	Oizumi	T. Kobayashi	·	4.2 km	MPC · JPL
65880	1997 YD_{5}	—	December 21, 1997	Xinglong	SCAP	·	3.9 km	MPC · JPL
65881	1997 YO_{5}	—	December 25, 1997	Oizumi	T. Kobayashi	(2076)	2.6 km	MPC · JPL
65882	1997 YR_{8}	—	December 28, 1997	Stroncone	Santa Lucia	EOS	5.7 km	MPC · JPL
65883	1997 YX_{13}	—	December 31, 1997	Oizumi	T. Kobayashi	HNS	2.8 km	MPC · JPL
65884	1997 YP_{15}	—	December 29, 1997	Kitt Peak	Spacewatch	·	3.3 km	MPC · JPL
65885 Lubenow	1997 YF_{20}	Lubenow	December 27, 1997	Anderson Mesa	M. W. Buie	·	2.0 km	MPC · JPL
65886	1998 AM	—	January 5, 1998	Oizumi	T. Kobayashi	·	2.2 km	MPC · JPL
65887	1998 AW_{6}	—	January 5, 1998	Xinglong	SCAP	·	6.5 km	MPC · JPL
65888	1998 BS_{3}	—	January 18, 1998	Kitt Peak	Spacewatch	AST	3.9 km	MPC · JPL
65889	1998 BB_{4}	—	January 23, 1998	Zeno	T. Stafford	ERI	5.1 km	MPC · JPL
65890	1998 BW_{23}	—	January 26, 1998	Kitt Peak	Spacewatch	NYS	2.0 km	MPC · JPL
65891	1998 BQ_{24}	—	January 28, 1998	Oizumi	T. Kobayashi	·	2.9 km	MPC · JPL
65892	1998 BH_{30}	—	January 28, 1998	Bédoin	P. Antonini	·	5.3 km	MPC · JPL
65893	1998 BY_{33}	—	January 31, 1998	Oizumi	T. Kobayashi	·	4.4 km	MPC · JPL
65894 Echizenmisaki	1998 BO_{48}	Echizenmisaki	January 30, 1998	Geisei	T. Seki	·	3.0 km	MPC · JPL
65895	1998 CP	—	February 3, 1998	Kleť	M. Tichý, Z. Moravec	NYS	2.2 km	MPC · JPL
65896	1998 CW_{1}	—	February 1, 1998	Xinglong	SCAP	·	2.6 km	MPC · JPL
65897	1998 DQ_{7}	—	February 22, 1998	Haleakala	NEAT	·	3.3 km	MPC · JPL
65898	1998 DG_{9}	—	February 22, 1998	Haleakala	NEAT	EUN	3.4 km	MPC · JPL
65899	1998 DG_{12}	—	February 23, 1998	Kitt Peak	Spacewatch	·	1.6 km	MPC · JPL
65900	1998 DV_{15}	—	February 23, 1998	Haleakala	NEAT	·	4.1 km	MPC · JPL

== 65901–66000 ==
back to top

Designation			Discovery			Properties		Ref
Permanent	Provisional	Named after	Date	Site	Discoverer(s)	Category	Diam.	Ref
65901	1998 DM_{16}	—	February 22, 1998	Kitt Peak	Spacewatch	·	2.6 km	MPC · JPL
65902	1998 DW_{17}	—	February 23, 1998	Kitt Peak	Spacewatch	·	2.1 km	MPC · JPL
65903	1998 DS_{25}	—	February 23, 1998	Kitt Peak	Spacewatch	MAS	2.4 km	MPC · JPL
65904	1998 DL_{35}	—	February 26, 1998	Reedy Creek	J. Broughton	·	3.1 km	MPC · JPL
65905	1998 EH_{2}	—	March 2, 1998	Caussols	ODAS	·	2.6 km	MPC · JPL
65906	1998 EZ_{5}	—	March 3, 1998	Kitt Peak	Spacewatch	NYS	3.6 km	MPC · JPL
65907	1998 EX_{11}	—	March 1, 1998	La Silla	E. W. Elst	·	4.8 km	MPC · JPL
65908	1998 FQ	—	March 18, 1998	Kitt Peak	Spacewatch	·	3.3 km	MPC · JPL
65909	1998 FH_{12}	—	March 25, 1998	Socorro	LINEAR	APO · PHA	490 m	MPC · JPL
65910	1998 FR_{21}	—	March 20, 1998	Socorro	LINEAR	·	6.7 km	MPC · JPL
65911	1998 FO_{25}	—	March 20, 1998	Socorro	LINEAR	·	2.6 km	MPC · JPL
65912	1998 FQ_{26}	—	March 20, 1998	Socorro	LINEAR	·	5.3 km	MPC · JPL
65913	1998 FD_{28}	—	March 20, 1998	Socorro	LINEAR	·	2.1 km	MPC · JPL
65914	1998 FB_{32}	—	March 20, 1998	Socorro	LINEAR	V	1.9 km	MPC · JPL
65915	1998 FO_{34}	—	March 20, 1998	Socorro	LINEAR	PHO	5.6 km	MPC · JPL
65916	1998 FJ_{36}	—	March 20, 1998	Socorro	LINEAR	V	1.9 km	MPC · JPL
65917	1998 FG_{38}	—	March 20, 1998	Socorro	LINEAR	·	2.7 km	MPC · JPL
65918	1998 FZ_{38}	—	March 20, 1998	Socorro	LINEAR	SUL	4.2 km	MPC · JPL
65919	1998 FH_{39}	—	March 20, 1998	Socorro	LINEAR	·	1.8 km	MPC · JPL
65920	1998 FV_{46}	—	March 20, 1998	Socorro	LINEAR	NYS	2.8 km	MPC · JPL
65921	1998 FM_{47}	—	March 20, 1998	Socorro	LINEAR	·	3.1 km	MPC · JPL
65922	1998 FQ_{47}	—	March 20, 1998	Socorro	LINEAR	·	1.6 km	MPC · JPL
65923	1998 FW_{47}	—	March 20, 1998	Socorro	LINEAR	·	2.0 km	MPC · JPL
65924	1998 FE_{53}	—	March 20, 1998	Socorro	LINEAR	·	2.2 km	MPC · JPL
65925	1998 FE_{54}	—	March 20, 1998	Socorro	LINEAR	·	2.4 km	MPC · JPL
65926	1998 FN_{55}	—	March 20, 1998	Socorro	LINEAR	·	3.2 km	MPC · JPL
65927	1998 FV_{55}	—	March 20, 1998	Socorro	LINEAR	NYS	2.4 km	MPC · JPL
65928	1998 FW_{55}	—	March 20, 1998	Socorro	LINEAR	·	5.0 km	MPC · JPL
65929	1998 FL_{56}	—	March 20, 1998	Socorro	LINEAR	·	5.1 km	MPC · JPL
65930	1998 FS_{57}	—	March 20, 1998	Socorro	LINEAR	·	3.2 km	MPC · JPL
65931	1998 FK_{59}	—	March 20, 1998	Socorro	LINEAR	PHO	2.4 km	MPC · JPL
65932	1998 FK_{60}	—	March 20, 1998	Socorro	LINEAR	·	1.8 km	MPC · JPL
65933	1998 FT_{64}	—	March 20, 1998	Socorro	LINEAR	·	3.3 km	MPC · JPL
65934	1998 FE_{65}	—	March 20, 1998	Socorro	LINEAR	·	2.6 km	MPC · JPL
65935	1998 FF_{65}	—	March 20, 1998	Socorro	LINEAR	KON	5.6 km	MPC · JPL
65936	1998 FJ_{69}	—	March 20, 1998	Socorro	LINEAR	·	5.1 km	MPC · JPL
65937 Hervéconstans	1998 FZ_{72}	Hervéconstans	March 26, 1998	Caussols	ODAS	·	3.1 km	MPC · JPL
65938	1998 FV_{77}	—	March 24, 1998	Socorro	LINEAR	EUN	4.1 km	MPC · JPL
65939	1998 FK_{79}	—	March 24, 1998	Socorro	LINEAR	·	5.4 km	MPC · JPL
65940	1998 FE_{80}	—	March 24, 1998	Socorro	LINEAR	·	1.8 km	MPC · JPL
65941	1998 FU_{87}	—	March 24, 1998	Socorro	LINEAR	V	2.0 km	MPC · JPL
65942	1998 FL_{90}	—	March 24, 1998	Socorro	LINEAR	·	2.5 km	MPC · JPL
65943	1998 FR_{98}	—	March 31, 1998	Socorro	LINEAR	·	6.2 km	MPC · JPL
65944	1998 FZ_{99}	—	March 31, 1998	Socorro	LINEAR	·	3.9 km	MPC · JPL
65945	1998 FZ_{100}	—	March 31, 1998	Socorro	LINEAR	·	5.5 km	MPC · JPL
65946	1998 FT_{103}	—	March 31, 1998	Socorro	LINEAR	·	4.2 km	MPC · JPL
65947	1998 FZ_{103}	—	March 31, 1998	Socorro	LINEAR	·	4.3 km	MPC · JPL
65948	1998 FT_{106}	—	March 31, 1998	Socorro	LINEAR	·	3.4 km	MPC · JPL
65949	1998 FJ_{107}	—	March 31, 1998	Socorro	LINEAR	·	2.8 km	MPC · JPL
65950	1998 FE_{114}	—	March 31, 1998	Socorro	LINEAR	BAP	3.5 km	MPC · JPL
65951	1998 FU_{119}	—	March 20, 1998	Socorro	LINEAR	EUN	3.5 km	MPC · JPL
65952	1998 FF_{122}	—	March 20, 1998	Socorro	LINEAR	·	3.2 km	MPC · JPL
65953	1998 FD_{123}	—	March 20, 1998	Socorro	LINEAR	·	3.9 km	MPC · JPL
65954	1998 FT_{131}	—	March 20, 1998	Socorro	LINEAR	·	2.9 km	MPC · JPL
65955	1998 FU_{132}	—	March 20, 1998	Socorro	LINEAR	·	2.7 km	MPC · JPL
65956	1998 FA_{146}	—	March 24, 1998	Socorro	LINEAR	·	2.4 km	MPC · JPL
65957	1998 FO_{147}	—	March 26, 1998	Socorro	LINEAR	V	3.2 km	MPC · JPL
65958	1998 GG_{1}	—	April 4, 1998	Woomera	F. B. Zoltowski	·	5.1 km	MPC · JPL
65959	1998 GU_{7}	—	April 2, 1998	Socorro	LINEAR	·	3.4 km	MPC · JPL
65960	1998 GX_{8}	—	April 2, 1998	Socorro	LINEAR	·	3.1 km	MPC · JPL
65961	1998 HC_{1}	—	April 18, 1998	Kitt Peak	Spacewatch	ADE	5.1 km	MPC · JPL
65962	1998 HU_{1}	—	April 18, 1998	Kitt Peak	Spacewatch	·	4.5 km	MPC · JPL
65963	1998 HC_{5}	—	April 22, 1998	Kitt Peak	Spacewatch	(5)	2.3 km	MPC · JPL
65964	1998 HB_{6}	—	April 21, 1998	Caussols	ODAS	·	3.4 km	MPC · JPL
65965	1998 HR_{7}	—	April 23, 1998	Socorro	LINEAR	·	6.7 km	MPC · JPL
65966	1998 HH_{8}	—	April 24, 1998	Stroncone	Santa Lucia	·	2.3 km	MPC · JPL
65967	1998 HM_{10}	—	April 17, 1998	Kitt Peak	Spacewatch	·	3.4 km	MPC · JPL
65968	1998 HV_{17}	—	April 18, 1998	Socorro	LINEAR	V	1.8 km	MPC · JPL
65969	1998 HN_{19}	—	April 18, 1998	Socorro	LINEAR	·	4.2 km	MPC · JPL
65970	1998 HB_{22}	—	April 20, 1998	Socorro	LINEAR	·	1.6 km	MPC · JPL
65971	1998 HY_{26}	—	April 21, 1998	Kitt Peak	Spacewatch	·	5.5 km	MPC · JPL
65972	1998 HJ_{28}	—	April 23, 1998	Kitt Peak	Spacewatch	·	6.3 km	MPC · JPL
65973	1998 HZ_{38}	—	April 20, 1998	Socorro	LINEAR	·	3.4 km	MPC · JPL
65974	1998 HP_{39}	—	April 20, 1998	Socorro	LINEAR	·	4.2 km	MPC · JPL
65975	1998 HV_{46}	—	April 20, 1998	Socorro	LINEAR	·	2.9 km	MPC · JPL
65976	1998 HF_{51}	—	April 25, 1998	Anderson Mesa	LONEOS	·	4.0 km	MPC · JPL
65977	1998 HZ_{69}	—	April 21, 1998	Socorro	LINEAR	·	3.8 km	MPC · JPL
65978	1998 HS_{98}	—	April 21, 1998	Socorro	LINEAR	·	4.4 km	MPC · JPL
65979	1998 HX_{105}	—	April 23, 1998	Socorro	LINEAR	·	3.5 km	MPC · JPL
65980	1998 HB_{107}	—	April 23, 1998	Socorro	LINEAR	EOS	4.3 km	MPC · JPL
65981	1998 HD_{119}	—	April 23, 1998	Socorro	LINEAR	JUN	3.0 km	MPC · JPL
65982	1998 HN_{119}	—	April 23, 1998	Socorro	LINEAR	·	4.9 km	MPC · JPL
65983	1998 HS_{124}	—	April 23, 1998	Socorro	LINEAR	·	2.1 km	MPC · JPL
65984	1998 HA_{125}	—	April 23, 1998	Socorro	LINEAR	slow	5.2 km	MPC · JPL
65985	1998 HX_{146}	—	April 23, 1998	Socorro	LINEAR	·	5.0 km	MPC · JPL
65986	1998 HA_{147}	—	April 23, 1998	Socorro	LINEAR	·	5.0 km	MPC · JPL
65987	1998 HD_{152}	—	April 21, 1998	Socorro	LINEAR	·	2.2 km	MPC · JPL
65988	1998 KQ_{1}	—	May 18, 1998	Anderson Mesa	LONEOS	·	5.1 km	MPC · JPL
65989	1998 KZ_{12}	—	May 22, 1998	Socorro	LINEAR	3:2	10 km	MPC · JPL
65990	1998 KR_{14}	—	May 22, 1998	Socorro	LINEAR	·	6.0 km	MPC · JPL
65991	1998 KL_{36}	—	May 22, 1998	Socorro	LINEAR	DOR	6.4 km	MPC · JPL
65992	1998 KG_{49}	—	May 23, 1998	Socorro	LINEAR	·	3.9 km	MPC · JPL
65993	1998 KP_{52}	—	May 23, 1998	Socorro	LINEAR	·	4.7 km	MPC · JPL
65994	1998 KE_{53}	—	May 23, 1998	Socorro	LINEAR	·	4.6 km	MPC · JPL
65995	1998 KZ_{57}	—	May 23, 1998	Socorro	LINEAR	·	3.2 km	MPC · JPL
65996	1998 MX_{5}	—	June 24, 1998	Socorro	LINEAR	T_{j} (2.95) · AMO	710 m	MPC · JPL
65997	1998 ME_{35}	—	June 24, 1998	Socorro	LINEAR	·	4.7 km	MPC · JPL
65998	1998 MX_{40}	—	June 28, 1998	La Silla	E. W. Elst	DOR	6.5 km	MPC · JPL
65999	1998 ND	—	July 1, 1998	Anderson Mesa	LONEOS	·	2.3 km	MPC · JPL
66000 Duilialoncao	1998 OE_{1}	Duilialoncao	July 20, 1998	San Marcello	A. Boattini, M. Tombelli	·	6.1 km	MPC · JPL

back to top

== See also ==
- Meanings of minor-planet names: 65001–66000
