= Fabrizio Bernardi =

Italian astronomer (born 1972)

Minor planets discovered: 28
65001 Teodorescu	9 January 2002	MPC ^{[A]}
78123 Dimare	10 July 2002	MPC ^{[A]}
78309 Alessielisa	5 August 2002	MPC
78453 Bullock	3 September 2002	MPC
84118 Bracalicioci	3 September 2002	MPC
84120 Antonacci	4 September 2002	MPC ^{[B]}
84339 Francescaballi	2 October 2002	MPC
90278 Caprese	24 February 2003	IAU ^{[D]}
95020 Nencini	10 January 2002	MPC
95951 Ernestopalomba	18 August 2003	MPC
99942 Apophis	19 June 2004	MPC ^{[C]}
111571 Bebevio	11 January 2002	IAU ^{[B]}
113683 Robertoornella	2 October 2002	IAU ^{[B]}
113684 Giannagianni	2 October 2002	IAU ^{[B]}
112320 Danielegardiol	19 June 2002	IAU ^{[D]}
112337 Francescaguerra	10 July 2002	IAU
112492 Annacipriani	19 June 2002	IAU
113208 Lea	5 September 2002	IAU
114735 Irenemagni	24 April 2003	IAU
120098 Telmopievani	10 March 2003	IAU ^{[B]}
126246 Losignore	9 January 2002	IAU
127415 Annacalderara	2 August 2002	IAU ^{[B]}
127660 Mauroianeselli	26 February 2003	IAU
250370 Obertocitterio	12 October 2003	MPC
280244 Ati	27 November 2002	IAU ^{[B]}
(413666) 2005 VJ119	7 November 2005	MPC
(624220) 2002 PS34	5 August 2002	JPL ^{[F]}
(624324) 2002 RG251	6 August 2002	JPL^{[F]}
120097 Janniksinner	10 March 2003	JPL^{[E]}
^{A} co-discovery with Andrea Boattini^{B} co-discovery with Maura Tombelli^{C} co-discovery with Roy Tucker and David Tholen^{D} co-discovery with Mario Di Martino^{E} co-discovery with Maura Tombelli

Fabrizio Bernardi (born 1972) is an Italian astronomer and discoverer of minor planets and comets, best known for the co-discovery of the near-Earth and potentially hazardous asteroid 99942 Apophis.

He is a member of the IAU, and credited by the Minor Planet Center with the discovery of 7 numbered minor planets during 2002–2005, including 280244 Ati, another near-Earth object a member of the Amor group of asteroids, and (413666) 2005 VJ119, a trans-Neptunian object. In 2002, he discovered the outer main-belt asteroid 65001 Teodorescu at Campo Imperatore station, Gran Sasso, Italy, and named it after his former wife, the Romanian astronomer Ana Teodorescu. To his present fiancée, Irene Magni, he named the asteroid 114735 Irenemagni..

He was involved together with colleagues Marco Micheli and David Tholen, with observations of the Mars-crosser asteroid 2007 WD5 during his stay at the University of Hawaii observatory. While at the Mauna Kea Observatories in Hawaii, he discovered 268P/Bernardi, a Jupiter family comet.

The main-belt asteroid 27983 Bernardi, discovered by astronomers Andrea Boattini and Maura Tombelli at Cima Ekar, was named in his honor on 9 November 2003 (M.P.C. 50252).

== Publications ==
ACM2002 Proceedings – Berlin: The Campo Imperatore Near Earth Objects Survey (CINEOS): Andrea Boattini, Germano D’Abramo, Giovanni B. Valsecchi, Andrea Carusi, Andrea Di Paola, Fabrizio Bernardi, Robert Jedicke, Alan W. Harris, Elisabetta Dotto and Fiore De Luise, et al. In press. Discovery of the heavily obscured Supernova SN2002CV. Astronomy and Astrophysics, v.393, p.L21-L24

Proceedings of the Planetologia Italiana Workshop – Bormio, Italy, 20–26 January 2001: CINEOS – Campo Imperatore Near Earth Objects Survey Expected background of asteroids and stars for the Wide Angle Camera of the Rosetta Mission

Asteroid background for the Wide Angle Camera of the Rosetta Mission, Poster, Division for Planetary Sciences 2001, New Orleans, USA

ESTEC Internal report, September 2000: Image simulation of the inner coma environment for the Wide Angle Camera of the OSIRIS experiment

== See also ==
- List of minor planet discoverers § F. Bernardi
- Meanings of minor planet names: 65001–66000 § 001
- Rosetta mission
