= Meanings of minor-planet names: 65001–66000 =

As minor planet discoveries are confirmed, they are given a permanent number by the IAU's Minor Planet Center (MPC), and the discoverers can then submit names for them, following the IAU's naming conventions. The list below concerns those minor planets in the specified number-range that have received names, and explains the meanings of those names.

Official naming citations of newly named small Solar System bodies are approved and published in a bulletin by IAU's Working Group for Small Bodies Nomenclature (WGSBN). Before May 2021, citations were published in MPC's Minor Planet Circulars for many decades. Recent citations can also be found on the JPL Small-Body Database (SBDB). Until his death in 2016, German astronomer Lutz D. Schmadel compiled these citations into the Dictionary of Minor Planet Names (DMP) and regularly updated the collection.

Based on Paul Herget's The Names of the Minor Planets, Schmadel also researched the unclear origin of numerous asteroids, most of which had been named prior to World War II. This article incorporates text from this source, which is in the public domain: SBDB New namings may only be added to this list below after official publication as the preannouncement of names is condemned. The WGSBN publishes a comprehensive guideline for the naming rules of non-cometary small Solar System bodies.

== 65001–65100 ==
| Named minor planet | Provisional | This minor planet was named for... | Ref · Catalog |
|---|---|---|---|
| 65001 Teodorescu | 2002 AF_{67} | Ana Maria Teodorescu, Romanian astronomer and wife of co-discoverer Fabrizio Bernardi. Her research includes modeling the evolution of X-ray binaries and the discovery of planetary nebulae in elliptical galaxies. | MPC · 65001 |
| 65091 Saramagrin | 2002 CF | Sara Magrin (born 1976), Italian astronomer, active member of the Asiago-DLR Asteroid Survey | JPL · 65091 |
| 65100 Birtwhistle | 2002 CR_{15} | Peter Birtwhistle (born 1958), British amateur astronomer and discoverer of minor planets | MPC · 65100 |

== 65101–65200 ==
back to top

| Named minor planet | Provisional | This minor planet was named for... | Ref · Catalog |
|---|---|---|---|
| 65159 Sprowls | 2002 CN_{152} | Marlene Sprowls Durig, mother of the discoverer Douglas Tybor Durig | JPL · 65159 |
| 65191 Janespencer | 2002 CR_{257} | Jane Ellen Burgess Spencer (b. 1951) is an American gardener and retired teacher, who has provided decades of moral and practical support as the beloved spouse of planetary scientist John Spencer and as a friend to many colleagues in the field. She was codiscoverer, with her husband, of a major volcanic eruption on Io in 1995 (IAUC 6149). | IAU · 65191 |

== 65201–65300 ==
back to top

| Named minor planet | Provisional | This minor planet was named for... | Ref · Catalog |
|---|---|---|---|
| 65210 Stichius | 2002 EG | Stichius, a Greek warrior at Troy, who together with Menestheus, carried the body of Amphimachus back to the Archaen troops. This prevented Hektor from stealing Amphimachus's helm | JPL · 65210 |
| 65213 Peterhobbs | 2002 EC_{9} | Englishman Peter Hobbs (born 1925), a master draughtsman for the British National Coal Board, a lifelong member of Mensa and a perfect-pitch pianist who teaches many students. | JPL · 65213 |
| 65241 Seeley | 2002 EP_{110} | Bob Seeley (born 1928), an accomplished Detroit pianist, playing music from Gershwin and Debussy to Scott Joplin. | JPL · 65241 |
| 65244 Ianwong | 2002 ED_{126} | Ian Wong (born 1990) is a postdoctoral fellow at the Massachusetts Institute of Technology (Cambridge, MA). His studies include photometric colors and spectroscopic measurements of Hilda asteroids, Jupiter Trojans, centaurs and Kuiper Belt Objects. | IAU · 65244 |

== 65301–65400 ==
back to top

| Named minor planet | Provisional | This minor planet was named for... | Ref · Catalog |
|---|---|---|---|
| 65357 Antoniucci | 2002 NR_{55} | Simone Antoniucci (born 1977), an Italian astronomer who obtained his degree in physics at "La Sapienza" University of Rome in 2003, with a thesis on infrared spectroscopy of protostars. He is currently a Ph.D. student in astronomy at Tor Vergata University, Rome, studying Young Stellar Objects using infrared high resolution spectroscopy and interferometry. | JPL · 65357 |
| 65363 Ruthanna | 2002 PQ_{11} | Ruthanna Dellinger Powell (1933–2003), aunt of American amateur astronomer Joseph A. Dellinger who discovered this minor planet. She was the youngest child of a large Indiana farm family. The devoted lifelong wife of Tommy Powell and mother of three, she brought peace, love and joy to all around her and faced life with quiet courage through tragedy and illness (Img). | JPL · 65363 |

== 65401–65500 ==
back to top

| Named minor planet | Provisional | This minor planet was named for... | Ref · Catalog |
|---|---|---|---|
| 65487 Divinacommedia | 2003 CD_{20} | The Divine Comedy ("Divina Commedia") is the most important poem by Dante Alighieri (1265–1321). It is considered one of the greatest works in world literature and includes many astronomical concepts of the time. This naming occurs on the 700th anniversary of Dante's death. | IAU · 65487 |
| 65489 Ceto | 2003 FX_{128} | Ceto, mythological monstrous sea creature, child of Gaia and Pontus; together with its sibling Phorcys (65489 Ceto I Phorcys), it produced numerous offspring, the Phorcydides | JPL · 65489 |

== 65501–65600 ==
back to top

| Named minor planet | Provisional | This minor planet was named for... | Ref · Catalog |
|---|---|---|---|
| 65541 Kasbek | 9593 P-L | Kasbek, high inactive volcano in the Georgian Caucasus, near the Russian border | JPL · 65541 |
| 65583 Theoklymenos | 4646 T-2 | Theoklymenos, son of Mantios and grandson of Melampus, Greek seer who, in the Odyssey, prophesies Odysseus' return to Ithaca and the death of Penelope's suitors | JPL · 65583 |
| 65590 Archeptolemos | 1305 T-3 | Archeptolemos, Trojan charioteer of Hector, killed by Teucer with the help of Apollo | JPL · 65590 |

== 65601–65700 ==
back to top

| Named minor planet | Provisional | This minor planet was named for... | Ref · Catalog |
|---|---|---|---|
| 65635 Hirayamashin | 1977 EA_{8} | Shin Hirayama, Japanese astrophysicist. | IAU · 65635 |
| 65637 Tsniimash | 1979 VS_{2} | TsNIIMash is an acronym for the Central Research Institute of Mechanical Engineering, which is an institute of the Russian Federal Space Agency. | JPL · 65637 |
| 65657 Hube | 1982 QB_{4} | Douglas P. Hube (born 1941), Canadian astronomer and president of the Royal Astronomical Society of Canada from 1994 to 1996 | MPC · 65657 |
| 65658 Gurnikovskaya | 1982 UA_{6} | Renata Yur'evna Gurnikovskaya (born 1974) is the older daughter of the discoverer | JPL · 65658 |
| 65672 Merrick | 1988 QD | In spite of facing the challenge of a rare form of leukemia, Dawson Tate Merrick (1999–2009) excelled at all he attempted, from his academic studies to sports | JPL · 65672 |
| 65675 Mohr-Gruber | 1989 AG_{6} | Curate Josef Mohr (1792–1848) and his organist Franz Xaver Gruber (1787–1863), Austrian musicians, composers of the Christmas carol "Silent Night! Holy Night!" (Stille Nacht, heilige Nacht) | MPC · 65675 |
| 65685 Behring | 1990 TY_{1} | Emil von Behring (1854–1917), German medical doctor and Nobelist, founder of the science of immunology | MPC · 65685 |
| 65688 Jarnac | 1990 VD_{8} | Jarnac, an observatory located in southern Arizona. | IAU · 65688 |
| 65692 Trifu | 1991 RH_{3} | Romanian-born Cezar I. Trifu (born 1954) studies the physics of seismic sources and induced seismicity as senior scientist and adjunct professor at Queen's University, Canada. He is the author of many papers and books. Trifu is also a world-famous short-wave radio operator. Name proposed by the first discoverer. | JPL · 65692 |
| 65694 Franzrosenzweig | 1991 RX_{40} | Franz Rosenzweig (1886–1929), modern Jewish religious thinker | MPC · 65694 |
| 65696 Pierrehenry | 1991 TP_{15} | Pierre Henry Senegas-Lowe (born 1989), son of the discoverer Andrew Lowe | MPC · 65696 |
| 65697 Paulandrew | 1991 TU_{15} | Paul Andrew Senegas-Lowe (born 1992), son of the discoverer Andrew Lowe | MPC · 65697 |
| 65698 Emmarochelle | 1991 TP_{16} | Emma Rochelle Slater (born 1989), stepdaughter of the discoverer Andrew Lowe | MPC · 65698 |

== 65701–65800 ==
back to top

| Named minor planet | Provisional | This minor planet was named for... | Ref · Catalog |
|---|---|---|---|
| 65708 Ehrlich | 1992 RB_{1} | Paul Ehrlich (1854–1915), German Nobelist, pioneer of hematology, immunology and chemotherapy | MPC · 65708 |
| 65712 Schneidmüller | 1992 SJ_{17} | Bernd Schneidmüller (born 1954), a German historian | JPL · 65712 |
| 65716 Ohkinohama | 1993 BZ_{2} | Ohkinohama is a 1.5-kilometer-long beach adjacent to the eastern part of Ashizurimisaki promontory at the southern end of Shikoku Island | JPL · 65716 |
| 65769 Mahalia | 1995 EN_{8} | Mahalia Jackson (1911–1972), American "Queen of Gospel Song" | JPL · 65769 |
| 65770 Leonardotestoni | 1995 KF_{1} | Leonardo Testoni (born 2017) is the first nephew of one of the co-discoverers of this minor planet. | IAU · 65770 |
| 65775 Reikotosa | 1995 SO_{2} | Reiko Tosa (born 1976), Japanese long-distance runner | JPL · 65775 |
| 65784 Naderayama | 1995 UF_{4} | Naderayama mountain (height 660 meters), located in the west of Yonezawa city, Yamagata prefecture | JPL · 65784 |
| 65785 Carlafracci | 1995 UC_{5} | Carla Fracci (1936–2021) was an Italian ballet dancer and actress, recognized for her interpretations of romantic and dramatic roles | JPL · 65785 |

== 65801–65900 ==
back to top

| Named minor planet | Provisional | This minor planet was named for... | Ref · Catalog |
|---|---|---|---|
| 65803 Didymos | 1996 GT | Greek for "twin" as the object was named after its binarity was confirmed in 2003 | MPC · 65803 |
| 65821 De Curtis | 1996 UC_{3} | Antonio De Curtis (1898–1967), nicknamed "Tot", was an Italian artist, comedian, film and theatre actor, writer, singer and songwriter. | JPL · 65821 |
| 65848 Enricomari | 1997 BP_{9} | Enrico Mari (1978–2007), a cousin of the discoverer and a member of the Montelupo Astronomical Group | JPL · 65848 |
| 65852 Alle | 1997 EX_{7} | Alessandro Colombini (born 2018), son of Alberto and Elena, and nephew of Italian amateur astronomer Ermes Colombini, who observes at the San Vittore Observatory where this minor planet was discovered. | IAU · 65852 |
| 65859 Mädler | 1997 GF_{42} | Johann Heinrich von Mädler (1794–1874) German astronomer and selenographer | JPL · 65859 |
| 65864 Claudepieplu | 1997 OT | Claude Pieplu, French actor. | IAU · 65864 |
| 65866 Wynneozrics | 1997 PA_{4} | Edward Wynne (b. 1961), an English guitarist and keyboardist. | IAU · 65866 |
| 65885 Lubenow | 1997 YF_{20} | Alexander Lubenow (1956–2005), American program coordinator at the Space Telescope Science Institute (Src) | JPL · 65885 |
| 65894 Echizenmisaki | 1998 BO_{48} | Echizenmisaki is a promontory in Fukui prefecture that projects into the Sea of Japan. It is a famous tourist attraction. | JPL · 65894 |

== 65901–66000 ==
back to top

| Named minor planet | Provisional | This minor planet was named for... | Ref · Catalog |
|---|---|---|---|
| 65937 Hervéconstans | 1998 FZ_{72} | Hervé Constans, French electronics engineer. | IAU · 65937 |
| 66000 Duilialoncao | 1998 OE_{1} | Duilia Loncao (b. 1955), an Italian amateur astronomer. | IAU · 66000 |

back to top

| Preceded by 64,001–65,000 | Meanings of minor-planet names List of minor planets: 65,001–66,000 | Succeeded by 66,001–67,000 |
