= Meanings of minor-planet names: 128001–129000 =

As minor planet discoveries are confirmed, they are given a permanent number by the IAU's Minor Planet Center (MPC), and the discoverers can then submit names for them, following the IAU's naming conventions. The list below concerns those minor planets in the specified number-range that have received names, and explains the meanings of those names.

Official naming citations of newly named small Solar System bodies are approved and published in a bulletin by IAU's Working Group for Small Bodies Nomenclature (WGSBN). Before May 2021, citations were published in MPC's Minor Planet Circulars for many decades. Recent citations can also be found on the JPL Small-Body Database (SBDB). Until his death in 2016, German astronomer Lutz D. Schmadel compiled these citations into the Dictionary of Minor Planet Names (DMP) and regularly updated the collection.

Based on Paul Herget's The Names of the Minor Planets, Schmadel also researched the unclear origin of numerous asteroids, most of which had been named prior to World War II. This article incorporates text from this source, which is in the public domain: SBDB New namings may only be added to this list below after official publication as the preannouncement of names is condemned. The WGSBN publishes a comprehensive guideline for the naming rules of non-cometary small Solar System bodies.

== 128001–128100 ==
| Named minor planet | Provisional | This minor planet was named for... | Ref · Catalog |
|---|---|---|---|
| 128022 Peterantreasian | 2003 JV_{17} | Peter Antreasian (born 1961) is the Navigation Team Chief at KinetX, Inc. for the OSIRIS-REx asteroid sample-return mission. He is responsible for leading the navigation team, and for defining the technical approach and results for navigation team products and deliveries. | JPL · 128022 |
| 128027 Bobsandy | 2003 KT_{3} | Robert Sandy, American amateur astronomer. | IAU · 128027 |
| 128036 Rafaelnadal | 2003 KM_{18} | Rafael Nadal (born 1986), Spanish tennis player | JPL · 128036 |
| 128038 Jimadams | 2003 KK_{23} | W. James Adams (b. 1957), a former American NASA project manager and executive. | IAU · 128038 |
| 128054 Eranyavneh | 2003 MR_{9} | Eran Yavneh (1971–1999), Israeli student, dead of cancer at age 27 (and probably a friend of the discoverer) | JPL · 128054 |
| 128062 Szrogh | 2003 NW_{5} | György Szrogh (1915–1999), Hungarian architect and professor of the Hungarian University of Arts and Design | JPL · 128062 |
| 128065 Bartbenjamin | 2003 OK | Bart Benjamin (born 1958), American curator at the Lakeview Museum of Arts and Sciences in Peoria, later director of the Cernan Earth and Space Center at Triton College in west suburban Chicago, and member of the Peoria Astronomical Society, Illinois | JPL · 128065 |

== 128101–128200 ==
back to top

| Named minor planet | Provisional | This minor planet was named for... | Ref · Catalog |
|---|---|---|---|
| 128166 Carora | 2003 QQ_{105} | The town of Carora in Venezuela | JPL · 128166 |
| 128177 Griffioen | 2003 RA_{11} | Roger Griffioen (born 1934), American former dean and physics department chair of Calvin College Src | JPL · 128177 |

== 128201–128300 ==
back to top

| Named minor planet | Provisional | This minor planet was named for... | Ref · Catalog |
|---|---|---|---|
| 128228 Williammarsh | 2003 SV_{123} | William H. Marsh (1926–2004) was an American professor of speech, debate, and drama in secondary schools and university systems. He was dedicated to his students and taught them to communicate effectively in many venues. His students became engineers, scientists, lawyers, and thespians. | IAU · 128228 |
| 128242 Šmahel | 2003 SF_{171} | František Šmahel (b. 1934), a Czech historian. | IAU · 128242 |
| 128297 Ashlevi | 2003 XD_{11} | Ashlie Philpott (born 1998) and Levi Lemley (born 2000), grandchildren of American astronomer James Whitney Young who discovered this minor planet | JPL · 128297 |

== 128301–128400 ==
back to top

| Named minor planet | Provisional | This minor planet was named for... | Ref · Catalog |
|---|---|---|---|
| 128314 Coraliejackman | 2004 CB_{109} | Coralie Jackman (born 1989), the lead optical navigation engineer at KinetX, Inc. for the OSIRIS-REx asteroid sample-return mission. | JPL · 128314 |
| 128315 Dereknelson | 2004 DK_{22} | Derek Nelson (born 1993), a member of the optical navigation team at KinetX, Inc. for the OSIRIS-REx asteroid sample-return mission. | JPL · 128315 |
| 128321 Philipdumont | 2004 EF_{43} | Philip Dumont (born 1949), the inventor and architect at KinetX, Inc. of the optical navigation suite of tools for simulation, operations and calibration of imagers for the OSIRIS-REx asteroid sample-return mission. | JPL · 128321 |
| 128323 Peterwolff | 2004 ES_{72} | Peter Wolff (born 1961), a member of the navigation team at KinetX, Inc. for the OSIRIS-REx asteroid sample-return mission. | JPL · 128323 |
| 128327 Ericcarranza | 2004 FP_{14} | Eric Carranza (born 1972), a member of the navigation team at KinetX, Inc. for the OSIRIS-REx asteroid sample-return mission. | JPL · 128327 |
| 128341 Dalestanbridge | 2004 FR_{128} | Dale Stanbridge (born 1962), a member of the navigation team at KinetX, Inc. for the OSIRIS-REx asteroid sample-return mission. He was also a member of the navigation team for the MESSENGER and New Horizons missions. | JPL · 128341 |
| 128343 Brianpage | 2004 GQ_{5} | Brian Page (born 1960), a member of the navigation team at KinetX, Inc. for the OSIRIS-REx asteroid sample-return mission. He was also a member of the navigation team for the MESSENGER and New Horizons missions. | JPL · 128343 |
| 128345 Danielbamberger | 2004 GY_{18} | Daniel Bamberger (born 1987) is a German amateur astronomer and genealogist. He is a co-founder of the Northolt Branch Observatories, a British-German collaboration dedicated to the study of Near Earth asteroids. He provides follow-up observations of Near Earth asteroids to the Minor Planet Center. | JPL · 128345 |
| 128348 Jasonleonard | 2004 GK_{27} | Jason Leonard (born 1987), a member of the navigation team at KinetX, Inc. for the OSIRIS-REx asteroid sample-return mission. | JPL · 128348 |
| 128372 Danielwibben | 2004 JE_{2} | Daniel Wibben (born 1987), a member of the navigation team at KinetX, Inc. for the OSIRIS-REx asteroid sample-return mission. | JPL · 128372 |
| 128373 Kevinjohnson | 2004 JV_{5} | Kevin S. Johnson (born 1956), the propulsion lead for the OSIRIS-REx asteroid sample-return mission | JPL · 128373 |
| 128389 Dougleland | 2004 KG_{14} | Doug Leland (born 1962), the Avionics lead for the OSIRIS-REx asteroid sample-return mission | JPL · 128389 |

== 128401–128500 ==
back to top

| Named minor planet | Provisional | This minor planet was named for... | Ref · Catalog |
|---|---|---|---|
| 128408 Mikehughes | 2004 LJ_{16} | Mike Hughes (born 1963), the Guidance, Navigation and Controls sub-system lead for the OSIRIS-REx asteroid sample-return mission | JPL · 128408 |
| 128417 Chrismccaa | 2004 LK_{24} | Chris McCaa (born 1974) is the Assembly Test and Launch Operations manager for the OSIRIS-REx asteroid sample-return mission. He has made significant contributions to many of NASA's interplanetary missions including MAVEN, Juno, Phoenix, Mars Odyssey and Mars Reconnaissance Orbiter. | JPL · 128417 |
| 128426 Vekerdi | 2004 MP_{6} | László Vekerdi (1924–2009) was a Hungarian librarian, historian of science and a writer. He published more than five hundred essays on science and popular science. His most important work is The life of Galilei. | JPL · 128426 |
| 128439 Chriswaters | 2004 NA_{11} | Christopher Waters (born 1973) is the deputy flight system program manager for the OSIRIS-REx asteroid sample-return mission and is responsible for issue oversight and resolution. In addition, Chris supported the GOES-R program formulation. | JPL · 128439 |
| 128474 Arbacia | 2004 PD_{1} | Patricio Dominguez Ärbaciä(1964–2013), professor of paleontology at the Complutense University of Madrid. | JPL · 128474 |

== 128501–128600 ==
back to top

| Named minor planet | Provisional | This minor planet was named for... | Ref · Catalog |
|---|---|---|---|
| 128523 Johnmuir | 2004 PX_{42} | John Muir (1838–1914), Scottish-American conservationist | JPL · 128523 |
| 128562 Murdin | 2004 PM_{90} | Paul Geoffrey Murdin (born 1942) held senior positions at the Royal Greenwich Observatory and other major institutions, and was a vice president and treasurer of the International Astronomical Union | JPL · 128562 |
| 128585 Alfredmaria | 2004 QV | Alfred Ries (born 1939) and Maria Ries (born 1946) are the parents of the Austrian discoverer Wolfgang Ries | JPL · 128585 |
| 128586 Jeremias | 2004 QW | Jeremias Ries (born 2006), godchild of Austrian amateur astronomer Wolfgang Ries who discovered this minor planet | JPL · 128586 |
| 128593 Balfourwhitney | 2004 QU_{6} | Balfour S. Whitney (1903–1993) was an American astronomer who spent his long life teaching astronomy and studying variable stars. He specialized in photographic photometry, taking over 72 000 plates for the study of eclipsing variables. Many of his students became professional astronomers. | IAU · 128593 |

== 128601–128700 ==
back to top

| Named minor planet | Provisional | This minor planet was named for... | Ref · Catalog |
|---|---|---|---|
| 128602 Careyparish | 2004 QL_{13} | Carey Parish (born 1971) was responsible for oversight of the Propulsion subsystem on the OSIRIS-REx asteroid sample-return mission, managing all aspects of the effort. In addition Carey has contributed directly to the success of the GRAIL, Phoenix and MRO Missions. | JPL · 128602 |
| 128604 Markfisher | 2004 QO_{14} | Mark Fisher (born 1964) is responsible for developing the mission control area for the OSIRIS-REx asteroid sample-return mission. Mark also led the Spitzer flight operations team to safely operate the mission well past its intended design life. | JPL · 128604 |
| 128607 Richhund | 2004 QJ_{18} | Rich Hund (born 1956) is the lead for the Structures, Mechanisms, Propulsion, Sample Return Capsule, and Touch-and-Go Sample Acquisition Mechanism development on the OSIRIS-REx asteroid sample-return mission. He was also responsible for the development and delivery of the MSL aeroshell. | JPL · 128607 |
| 128608 Chucklove | 2004 QR_{18} | Charles Love (born 1955) is the Flight System Mission Assurance Manager for the OSIRIS-REx asteroid sample-return mission. He also contributed to the success of the Mars Reconnaissance Orbiter, Spitzer, Odyssey, Stardust, Genesis and Phoenix missions. | JPL · 128608 |
| 128610 Stasiahabenicht | 2004 QR_{20} | Anastasia Habenicht (born 1971) is the software lead for the flight system on the OSIRIS-REx asteroid sample-return mission. Stasia also contributed directly to the success of many NASA missions including MAVEN, Phoenix, the Orbital Space Plane and NASA's advanced space transportation efforts. | JPL · 128610 |
| 128611 Paulnowak | 2004 QB_{21} | Paul Nowak (born 1957) is the Flight System Business Manager for the OSIRIS-REx asteroid sample-return mission. In addition, Paul has been the business manager contributing significantly to other NASA missions by overseeing the development on the MAVEN, JUNO, GRAIL and the Phoenix Lander missions | JPL · 128611 |
| 128614 Juliabest | 2004 QO_{24} | Julia Best (born 1975) is the planning lead for the flight system on the OSIRIS-REx asteroid sample-return mission. Prior to serving in this role she was a member of the GOES-R development team. | JPL · 128614 |
| 128615 Jimharris | 2004 QR_{24} | Jim Harris (born 1953) is the Touch and Go Sample Acquisition Mechanism Certified Principal Engineer for the OSIRIS-REx asteroid sample-return mission. He was also the mechanism designer on the MSL aeroshell program, Genesis sample return mission and Stardust sample return mission. | JPL · 128615 |
| 128622 Rudiš | 2004 RU | Viktor Rudiš (born 1927), Czech architect known for the Czechoslovak Pavilion at the Expo '70 in Japan | JPL · 128622 |
| 128627 Ottmarsheim | 2004 RM_{8} | The village of Ottmarsheim, Alsace, France | JPL · 128627 |
| 128633 Queyras | 2004 RF_{12} | Queyras, a valley of the French Alps | JPL · 128633 |

== 128701–128800 ==
back to top

| Named minor planet | Provisional | This minor planet was named for... | Ref · Catalog |
|---|---|---|---|
| 128795 Douglaswalker | 2004 RG_{222} | Douglas K. Walker (born 1955) is an American engineer and astronomer. He specializes in statistical analysis and system modeling for defense applications. A midlife career change, and experience teaching astronomy, led to his PhD in astronomy. He continues his work on variable stars as well as defense project consulting. | IAU · 128795 |

== 128801–128900 ==
back to top

| Named minor planet | Provisional | This minor planet was named for... | Ref · Catalog |
|---|---|---|---|
| 128882 Jennydebenedetti | 2004 SX_{55} | Jennifer C. DeBenedetti (born 1982) is a respected American teacher of elementary grade students. She develops science curricula, and guides her students to myriad award-winning science, engineering, and robotic projects. She specializes in highly innovative independent student research projects. | IAU · 128882 |
| 128895 Bright Spring | 2004 TW | Bright Spring, the title of an essay by Summer Vigil, a second-grade student in Albuquerque, New Mexico, about the fictitious discovery of a new major planet | JPL · 128895 |

== 128901–129000 ==
back to top

| Named minor planet | Provisional | This minor planet was named for... | Ref · Catalog |
|---|---|---|---|
| 128925 Conwell | 2004 TJ_{70} | James Conwell (born 1952), professor at Eastern Illinois University since 1985, and the director of the Eastern Illinois University Observatory since founding it in 2004 | JPL · 128925 |

back to top

| Preceded by 127,001–128,000 | Meanings of minor-planet names List of minor planets: 128,001–129,000 | Succeeded by 129,001–130,000 |
