= List of minor planets: 128001–129000 =

The following is a partial list of minor planets, running from minor-planet number 128001 through 129000, inclusive. The primary data for this and other partial lists is based on JPL's "Small-Body Orbital Elements" and data available from the Minor Planet Center. Critical list information is also provided by the MPC, unless otherwise specified from Lowell Observatory. A detailed description of the table's columns and additional sources are given on the main page including a complete list of every page in this series, and a statistical break-up on the dynamical classification of minor planets.

Also see the summary list of all named bodies in numerical and alphabetical order, and the corresponding naming citations for the number range of this particular list. New namings may only be added to this list after official publication, as the preannouncement of names is condemned by the Working Group for Small Bodies Nomenclature of the International Astronomical Union.

Near-Earth obj.	MBA (inner)	MBA (outer)	Centaur
Mars-crosser	MBA (middle)	Jupiter trojan	Trans-Neptunian obj.
Unclassified

== 128001–128100 ==
Designation			Discovery			Properties		Ref
Permanent	Provisional	Named after	Date	Site	Discoverer(s)	Category	Diam.	Ref
128001	2003 HV_{51}	—	April 30, 2003	Kitt Peak	Spacewatch	·	3.0 km	MPC · JPL
128002	2003 HU_{52}	—	April 29, 2003	Anderson Mesa	LONEOS	·	1.7 km	MPC · JPL
128003	2003 HM_{53}	—	April 27, 2003	Anderson Mesa	LONEOS	·	3.4 km	MPC · JPL
128004	2003 HY_{53}	—	April 23, 2003	Bergisch Gladbach	W. Bickel	·	2.1 km	MPC · JPL
128005	2003 HH_{54}	—	April 24, 2003	Anderson Mesa	LONEOS	·	3.1 km	MPC · JPL
128006	2003 HG_{55}	—	April 25, 2003	Kitt Peak	Spacewatch	KOR	2.0 km	MPC · JPL
128007	2003 HS_{55}	—	April 29, 2003	Socorro	LINEAR	NYS · fast	2.6 km	MPC · JPL
128008	2003 JQ_{1}	—	May 1, 2003	Socorro	LINEAR	EOS	4.7 km	MPC · JPL
128009	2003 JP_{6}	—	May 1, 2003	Socorro	LINEAR	·	3.6 km	MPC · JPL
128010	2003 JY_{7}	—	May 2, 2003	Socorro	LINEAR	·	3.0 km	MPC · JPL
128011	2003 JK_{8}	—	May 2, 2003	Socorro	LINEAR	·	3.6 km	MPC · JPL
128012	2003 JV_{9}	—	May 3, 2003	Kitt Peak	Spacewatch	·	5.0 km	MPC · JPL
128013	2003 JO_{10}	—	May 2, 2003	Kitt Peak	Spacewatch	·	5.0 km	MPC · JPL
128014	2003 JR_{10}	—	May 2, 2003	Haleakala	NEAT	·	2.0 km	MPC · JPL
128015	2003 JR_{11}	—	May 2, 2003	Socorro	LINEAR	VER ·	6.3 km	MPC · JPL
128016	2003 JK_{13}	—	May 6, 2003	Catalina	CSS	·	3.3 km	MPC · JPL
128017	2003 JL_{13}	—	May 6, 2003	Kitt Peak	Spacewatch	·	1.4 km	MPC · JPL
128018	2003 JA_{14}	—	May 7, 2003	Catalina	CSS	·	8.1 km	MPC · JPL
128019	2003 JB_{15}	—	May 5, 2003	Kitt Peak	Spacewatch	·	2.0 km	MPC · JPL
128020	2003 JK_{16}	—	May 8, 2003	Socorro	LINEAR	·	3.6 km	MPC · JPL
128021	2003 JN_{17}	—	May 10, 2003	Kitt Peak	Spacewatch	NYS	1.8 km	MPC · JPL
128022 Peterantreasian	2003 JV_{17}	Peterantreasian	May 2, 2003	Catalina	CSS	·	4.4 km	MPC · JPL
128023	2003 KE	—	May 20, 2003	Anderson Mesa	LONEOS	PHO	1.8 km	MPC · JPL
128024	2003 KH	—	May 20, 2003	Anderson Mesa	LONEOS	·	3.9 km	MPC · JPL
128025	2003 KK	—	May 20, 2003	Haleakala	NEAT	·	2.3 km	MPC · JPL
128026	2003 KE_{1}	—	May 22, 2003	Nogales	Tenagra II	·	1.9 km	MPC · JPL
128027 Bobsandy	2003 KT_{3}	Bobsandy	May 22, 2003	Reedy Creek	J. Broughton	LUT	8.4 km	MPC · JPL
128028	2003 KM_{5}	—	May 22, 2003	Kitt Peak	Spacewatch	·	6.1 km	MPC · JPL
128029	2003 KV_{7}	—	May 23, 2003	Nashville	Clingan, R.	·	2.3 km	MPC · JPL
128030	2003 KK_{14}	—	May 25, 2003	Kitt Peak	Spacewatch	·	1.0 km	MPC · JPL
128031	2003 KM_{14}	—	May 25, 2003	Anderson Mesa	LONEOS	·	2.0 km	MPC · JPL
128032	2003 KW_{17}	—	May 27, 2003	Haleakala	NEAT	·	1.5 km	MPC · JPL
128033	2003 KX_{17}	—	May 27, 2003	Haleakala	NEAT	·	5.5 km	MPC · JPL
128034	2003 KB_{18}	—	May 27, 2003	Haleakala	NEAT	TEL	2.7 km	MPC · JPL
128035	2003 KK_{18}	—	May 29, 2003	Socorro	LINEAR	·	1.6 km	MPC · JPL
128036 Rafaelnadal	2003 KM_{18}	Rafaelnadal	May 28, 2003	Majorca	OAM	·	1.7 km	MPC · JPL
128037	2003 KU_{18}	—	May 26, 2003	Reedy Creek	J. Broughton	·	1.4 km	MPC · JPL
128038 Jimadams	2003 KK_{23}	Jimadams	May 30, 2003	Cerro Tololo	M. W. Buie	HYG	3.9 km	MPC · JPL
128039	2003 KC_{35}	—	May 29, 2003	Socorro	LINEAR	·	3.9 km	MPC · JPL
128040	2003 KR_{35}	—	May 30, 2003	Socorro	LINEAR	·	1.5 km	MPC · JPL
128041	2003 KG_{36}	—	May 30, 2003	Socorro	LINEAR	·	2.8 km	MPC · JPL
128042	2003 LU	—	June 2, 2003	Kitt Peak	Spacewatch	·	2.2 km	MPC · JPL
128043	2003 LN_{1}	—	June 2, 2003	Kitt Peak	Spacewatch	·	5.9 km	MPC · JPL
128044	2003 LA_{3}	—	June 1, 2003	Kitt Peak	Spacewatch	·	2.4 km	MPC · JPL
128045	2003 LH_{6}	—	June 6, 2003	Reedy Creek	J. Broughton	THM	4.3 km	MPC · JPL
128046	2003 MY_{1}	—	June 23, 2003	Anderson Mesa	LONEOS	MAR	3.0 km	MPC · JPL
128047	2003 MC_{2}	—	June 21, 2003	Anderson Mesa	LONEOS	·	3.1 km	MPC · JPL
128048	2003 MG_{3}	—	June 25, 2003	Socorro	LINEAR	·	1.5 km	MPC · JPL
128049	2003 MA_{6}	—	June 26, 2003	Socorro	LINEAR	·	5.7 km	MPC · JPL
128050	2003 MJ_{6}	—	June 26, 2003	Haleakala	NEAT	·	5.1 km	MPC · JPL
128051	2003 MT_{6}	—	June 26, 2003	Haleakala	NEAT	EUN	3.2 km	MPC · JPL
128052	2003 MW_{8}	—	June 28, 2003	Socorro	LINEAR	·	2.8 km	MPC · JPL
128053	2003 MB_{9}	—	June 29, 2003	Socorro	LINEAR	·	8.0 km	MPC · JPL
128054 Eranyavneh	2003 MR_{9}	Eranyavneh	June 28, 2003	Wise	Polishook, D.	·	6.8 km	MPC · JPL
128055	2003 MM_{10}	—	June 22, 2003	Anderson Mesa	LONEOS	·	2.8 km	MPC · JPL
128056	2003 MU_{12}	—	June 30, 2003	Socorro	LINEAR	·	9.2 km	MPC · JPL
128057	2003 NR	—	July 1, 2003	Haleakala	NEAT	·	3.3 km	MPC · JPL
128058	2003 NJ_{2}	—	July 3, 2003	Reedy Creek	J. Broughton	(7744)	2.9 km	MPC · JPL
128059	2003 NW_{2}	—	July 1, 2003	Haleakala	NEAT	T_{j} (2.97) · 3:2	14 km	MPC · JPL
128060	2003 NJ_{3}	—	July 4, 2003	Anderson Mesa	LONEOS	·	8.0 km	MPC · JPL
128061	2003 NN_{3}	—	July 2, 2003	Haleakala	NEAT	·	6.3 km	MPC · JPL
128062 Szrogh	2003 NW_{5}	Szrogh	July 6, 2003	Piszkéstető	K. Sárneczky, B. Sipőcz	·	5.0 km	MPC · JPL
128063	2003 NB_{8}	—	July 8, 2003	Palomar	NEAT	NYS	2.1 km	MPC · JPL
128064	2003 NK_{9}	—	July 1, 2003	Socorro	LINEAR	(5)	2.5 km	MPC · JPL
128065 Bartbenjamin	2003 OK	Bartbenjamin	July 19, 2003	Desert Moon	Stevens, B. L.	·	3.5 km	MPC · JPL
128066	2003 OM	—	July 17, 2003	Reedy Creek	J. Broughton	NYS	2.4 km	MPC · JPL
128067	2003 OK_{4}	—	July 22, 2003	Campo Imperatore	CINEOS	·	4.3 km	MPC · JPL
128068	2003 OT_{4}	—	July 22, 2003	Haleakala	NEAT	·	5.0 km	MPC · JPL
128069	2003 OF_{7}	—	July 24, 2003	Campo Imperatore	CINEOS	EOS	4.2 km	MPC · JPL
128070	2003 OE_{8}	—	July 25, 2003	Reedy Creek	J. Broughton	·	4.6 km	MPC · JPL
128071	2003 OS_{9}	—	July 25, 2003	Socorro	LINEAR	·	8.1 km	MPC · JPL
128072	2003 OV_{9}	—	July 25, 2003	Socorro	LINEAR	·	3.6 km	MPC · JPL
128073	2003 OQ_{10}	—	July 27, 2003	Reedy Creek	J. Broughton	DOR	4.7 km	MPC · JPL
128074	2003 OF_{13}	—	July 27, 2003	Reedy Creek	J. Broughton	·	2.5 km	MPC · JPL
128075	2003 OW_{14}	—	July 22, 2003	Palomar	NEAT	·	5.6 km	MPC · JPL
128076	2003 OA_{15}	—	July 22, 2003	Palomar	NEAT	·	7.4 km	MPC · JPL
128077	2003 OS_{16}	—	July 26, 2003	Socorro	LINEAR	·	3.9 km	MPC · JPL
128078	2003 OE_{17}	—	July 29, 2003	Campo Imperatore	CINEOS	·	2.9 km	MPC · JPL
128079	2003 OL_{17}	—	July 29, 2003	Campo Imperatore	CINEOS	EOS	3.5 km	MPC · JPL
128080	2003 OQ_{20}	—	July 31, 2003	Reedy Creek	J. Broughton	·	3.1 km	MPC · JPL
128081	2003 OO_{21}	—	July 29, 2003	Reedy Creek	J. Broughton	·	2.6 km	MPC · JPL
128082	2003 OS_{23}	—	July 22, 2003	Haleakala	NEAT	EOS	3.7 km	MPC · JPL
128083	2003 OJ_{26}	—	July 24, 2003	Palomar	NEAT	·	2.7 km	MPC · JPL
128084	2003 OP_{29}	—	July 24, 2003	Palomar	NEAT	·	4.7 km	MPC · JPL
128085	2003 OT_{29}	—	July 24, 2003	Palomar	NEAT	AGN	2.2 km	MPC · JPL
128086	2003 OQ_{31}	—	July 30, 2003	Campo Imperatore	CINEOS	·	6.2 km	MPC · JPL
128087	2003 PH	—	August 1, 2003	Reedy Creek	J. Broughton	·	2.1 km	MPC · JPL
128088	2003 PL	—	August 1, 2003	Črni Vrh	Skvarč, J.	·	6.1 km	MPC · JPL
128089	2003 PG_{3}	—	August 2, 2003	Haleakala	NEAT	·	3.8 km	MPC · JPL
128090	2003 PJ_{4}	—	August 2, 2003	Reedy Creek	J. Broughton	·	3.1 km	MPC · JPL
128091	2003 PY_{5}	—	August 1, 2003	Socorro	LINEAR	·	3.3 km	MPC · JPL
128092	2003 PJ_{6}	—	August 1, 2003	Socorro	LINEAR	·	7.1 km	MPC · JPL
128093	2003 PE_{7}	—	August 1, 2003	Haleakala	NEAT	AGN	2.3 km	MPC · JPL
128094	2003 PT_{7}	—	August 2, 2003	Haleakala	NEAT	·	2.8 km	MPC · JPL
128095	2003 PU_{7}	—	August 2, 2003	Haleakala	NEAT	EOS	3.2 km	MPC · JPL
128096	2003 PZ_{7}	—	August 2, 2003	Haleakala	NEAT	·	1.5 km	MPC · JPL
128097	2003 PS_{8}	—	August 4, 2003	Socorro	LINEAR	HYG	4.8 km	MPC · JPL
128098	2003 PX_{8}	—	August 4, 2003	Socorro	LINEAR	·	3.4 km	MPC · JPL
128099	2003 PC_{9}	—	August 4, 2003	Socorro	LINEAR	·	3.4 km	MPC · JPL
128100	2003 PY_{9}	—	August 3, 2003	Needville	Dillon, W. G., J. Dellinger	HYG	4.6 km	MPC · JPL

== 128101–128200 ==
back to top

Designation			Discovery			Properties		Ref
Permanent	Provisional	Named after	Date	Site	Discoverer(s)	Category	Diam.	Ref
128101	2003 PG_{11}	—	August 5, 2003	Bergisch Gladbach	W. Bickel	BRA	2.5 km	MPC · JPL
128102	2003 PA_{12}	—	August 4, 2003	Socorro	LINEAR	·	2.3 km	MPC · JPL
128103	2003 QW_{1}	—	August 19, 2003	Campo Imperatore	CINEOS	KOR	2.9 km	MPC · JPL
128104	2003 QG_{4}	—	August 18, 2003	Campo Imperatore	CINEOS	·	4.3 km	MPC · JPL
128105	2003 QK_{6}	—	August 18, 2003	Campo Imperatore	CINEOS	·	4.9 km	MPC · JPL
128106	2003 QQ_{7}	—	August 21, 2003	Palomar	NEAT	·	6.7 km	MPC · JPL
128107	2003 QY_{9}	—	August 20, 2003	Reedy Creek	J. Broughton	·	5.0 km	MPC · JPL
128108	2003 QP_{13}	—	August 22, 2003	Palomar	NEAT	JUN	1.9 km	MPC · JPL
128109	2003 QB_{14}	—	August 20, 2003	Palomar	NEAT	·	3.8 km	MPC · JPL
128110	2003 QJ_{15}	—	August 20, 2003	Palomar	NEAT	·	6.1 km	MPC · JPL
128111	2003 QJ_{17}	—	August 22, 2003	Palomar	NEAT	·	3.2 km	MPC · JPL
128112	2003 QP_{18}	—	August 22, 2003	Palomar	NEAT	THM	4.4 km	MPC · JPL
128113	2003 QK_{19}	—	August 22, 2003	Socorro	LINEAR	·	4.8 km	MPC · JPL
128114	2003 QW_{19}	—	August 22, 2003	Palomar	NEAT	·	7.2 km	MPC · JPL
128115	2003 QC_{26}	—	August 22, 2003	Socorro	LINEAR	·	3.6 km	MPC · JPL
128116	2003 QE_{30}	—	August 22, 2003	Reedy Creek	J. Broughton	·	5.9 km	MPC · JPL
128117	2003 QP_{33}	—	August 22, 2003	Haleakala	NEAT	·	4.4 km	MPC · JPL
128118	2003 QY_{33}	—	August 22, 2003	Palomar	NEAT	·	5.2 km	MPC · JPL
128119	2003 QF_{34}	—	August 22, 2003	Palomar	NEAT	·	3.9 km	MPC · JPL
128120	2003 QS_{34}	—	August 22, 2003	Palomar	NEAT	KOR	2.7 km	MPC · JPL
128121	2003 QA_{35}	—	August 22, 2003	Palomar	NEAT	T_{j} (2.98) · 3:2	8.8 km	MPC · JPL
128122	2003 QD_{35}	—	August 22, 2003	Palomar	NEAT	·	4.2 km	MPC · JPL
128123	2003 QR_{35}	—	August 22, 2003	Palomar	NEAT	·	6.3 km	MPC · JPL
128124	2003 QY_{38}	—	August 22, 2003	Socorro	LINEAR	·	5.8 km	MPC · JPL
128125	2003 QK_{39}	—	August 22, 2003	Socorro	LINEAR	KOR	3.1 km	MPC · JPL
128126	2003 QY_{39}	—	August 22, 2003	Socorro	LINEAR	3:2 · SHU	10 km	MPC · JPL
128127	2003 QN_{40}	—	August 22, 2003	Socorro	LINEAR	·	2.9 km	MPC · JPL
128128	2003 QO_{40}	—	August 22, 2003	Socorro	LINEAR	CYB	7.9 km	MPC · JPL
128129	2003 QR_{40}	—	August 22, 2003	Socorro	LINEAR	GEF	2.6 km	MPC · JPL
128130	2003 QU_{44}	—	August 23, 2003	Socorro	LINEAR	·	3.9 km	MPC · JPL
128131	2003 QV_{44}	—	August 23, 2003	Socorro	LINEAR	·	3.6 km	MPC · JPL
128132	2003 QW_{45}	—	August 23, 2003	Socorro	LINEAR	·	3.5 km	MPC · JPL
128133	2003 QT_{46}	—	August 24, 2003	Palomar	NEAT	EOS	3.9 km	MPC · JPL
128134	2003 QX_{46}	—	August 24, 2003	Socorro	LINEAR	·	7.1 km	MPC · JPL
128135	2003 QL_{48}	—	August 20, 2003	Palomar	NEAT	·	1.7 km	MPC · JPL
128136	2003 QR_{50}	—	August 22, 2003	Haleakala	NEAT	·	6.0 km	MPC · JPL
128137	2003 QQ_{52}	—	August 23, 2003	Socorro	LINEAR	EOS	4.0 km	MPC · JPL
128138	2003 QD_{54}	—	August 23, 2003	Socorro	LINEAR	·	6.7 km	MPC · JPL
128139	2003 QU_{55}	—	August 23, 2003	Socorro	LINEAR	·	5.8 km	MPC · JPL
128140	2003 QK_{56}	—	August 23, 2003	Socorro	LINEAR	·	4.8 km	MPC · JPL
128141	2003 QE_{58}	—	August 23, 2003	Palomar	NEAT	·	4.9 km	MPC · JPL
128142	2003 QH_{60}	—	August 23, 2003	Socorro	LINEAR	KOR	2.7 km	MPC · JPL
128143	2003 QS_{60}	—	August 23, 2003	Socorro	LINEAR	·	4.9 km	MPC · JPL
128144	2003 QA_{61}	—	August 23, 2003	Socorro	LINEAR	(5931)	11 km	MPC · JPL
128145	2003 QL_{61}	—	August 23, 2003	Socorro	LINEAR	·	4.4 km	MPC · JPL
128146	2003 QO_{65}	—	August 25, 2003	Palomar	NEAT	HYG	4.9 km	MPC · JPL
128147	2003 QX_{68}	—	August 24, 2003	Reedy Creek	J. Broughton	·	4.6 km	MPC · JPL
128148	2003 QH_{69}	—	August 23, 2003	Palomar	NEAT	EUN	2.7 km	MPC · JPL
128149	2003 QX_{71}	—	August 25, 2003	Palomar	NEAT	·	8.0 km	MPC · JPL
128150	2003 QL_{77}	—	August 24, 2003	Socorro	LINEAR	·	8.2 km	MPC · JPL
128151	2003 QZ_{78}	—	August 24, 2003	Socorro	LINEAR	EUN	3.1 km	MPC · JPL
128152	2003 QW_{79}	—	August 25, 2003	Reedy Creek	J. Broughton	·	6.6 km	MPC · JPL
128153	2003 QT_{81}	—	August 23, 2003	Socorro	LINEAR	·	3.0 km	MPC · JPL
128154	2003 QX_{88}	—	August 25, 2003	Socorro	LINEAR	·	3.3 km	MPC · JPL
128155	2003 QY_{88}	—	August 25, 2003	Palomar	NEAT	·	3.9 km	MPC · JPL
128156	2003 QK_{92}	—	August 29, 2003	Needville	J. Dellinger, Garossino, P.	·	4.6 km	MPC · JPL
128157	2003 QG_{94}	—	August 28, 2003	Haleakala	NEAT	·	3.5 km	MPC · JPL
128158	2003 QA_{96}	—	August 30, 2003	Kitt Peak	Spacewatch	KOR	2.2 km	MPC · JPL
128159	2003 QJ_{100}	—	August 28, 2003	Palomar	NEAT	·	3.5 km	MPC · JPL
128160	2003 QX_{100}	—	August 28, 2003	Haleakala	NEAT	·	2.3 km	MPC · JPL
128161	2003 QV_{102}	—	August 31, 2003	Kitt Peak	Spacewatch	·	3.9 km	MPC · JPL
128162	2003 QC_{103}	—	August 31, 2003	Kitt Peak	Spacewatch	·	5.7 km	MPC · JPL
128163	2003 QP_{103}	—	August 31, 2003	Haleakala	NEAT	·	2.8 km	MPC · JPL
128164	2003 QJ_{104}	—	August 30, 2003	Reedy Creek	J. Broughton	·	8.3 km	MPC · JPL
128165	2003 QR_{104}	—	August 29, 2003	Socorro	LINEAR	·	6.1 km	MPC · JPL
128166 Carora	2003 QQ_{105}	Carora	August 27, 2003	Mérida	Ferrin, I. R., Leal, C.	·	4.9 km	MPC · JPL
128167	2003 QA_{106}	—	August 30, 2003	Kitt Peak	Spacewatch	·	4.4 km	MPC · JPL
128168	2003 QC_{109}	—	August 31, 2003	Socorro	LINEAR	EOS	3.7 km	MPC · JPL
128169	2003 RD_{1}	—	September 2, 2003	Socorro	LINEAR	HYG	5.2 km	MPC · JPL
128170	2003 RA_{2}	—	September 2, 2003	Socorro	LINEAR	EOS	4.2 km	MPC · JPL
128171	2003 RT_{2}	—	September 1, 2003	Socorro	LINEAR	·	4.1 km	MPC · JPL
128172	2003 RA_{4}	—	September 1, 2003	Socorro	LINEAR	·	4.6 km	MPC · JPL
128173	2003 RD_{8}	—	September 5, 2003	Haleakala	NEAT	(5)	2.3 km	MPC · JPL
128174	2003 RW_{8}	—	September 1, 2003	Socorro	LINEAR	·	3.4 km	MPC · JPL
128175	2003 RP_{9}	—	September 4, 2003	Socorro	LINEAR	3:2	10 km	MPC · JPL
128176	2003 RB_{10}	—	September 1, 2003	Bergisch Gladbach	W. Bickel	·	6.1 km	MPC · JPL
128177 Griffioen	2003 RA_{11}	Griffioen	September 5, 2003	Calvin College	A. Vanden Heuvel	·	3.3 km	MPC · JPL
128178	2003 RE_{12}	—	September 13, 2003	Haleakala	NEAT	·	6.5 km	MPC · JPL
128179	2003 RV_{12}	—	September 14, 2003	Haleakala	NEAT	·	6.7 km	MPC · JPL
128180	2003 RY_{13}	—	September 15, 2003	Haleakala	NEAT	·	7.7 km	MPC · JPL
128181	2003 RS_{14}	—	September 13, 2003	Haleakala	NEAT	HOF	5.3 km	MPC · JPL
128182	2003 RO_{18}	—	September 15, 2003	Anderson Mesa	LONEOS	·	6.3 km	MPC · JPL
128183	2003 RP_{22}	—	September 15, 2003	Haleakala	NEAT	·	4.4 km	MPC · JPL
128184	2003 RN_{23}	—	September 14, 2003	Palomar	NEAT	·	3.3 km	MPC · JPL
128185	2003 SP	—	September 16, 2003	Kitt Peak	Spacewatch	·	6.6 km	MPC · JPL
128186	2003 SG_{1}	—	September 16, 2003	Kitt Peak	Spacewatch	HYG	3.9 km	MPC · JPL
128187	2003 SJ_{2}	—	September 16, 2003	Kitt Peak	Spacewatch	KOR	2.0 km	MPC · JPL
128188	2003 SB_{3}	—	September 16, 2003	Palomar	NEAT	·	7.0 km	MPC · JPL
128189	2003 SR_{6}	—	September 17, 2003	Desert Eagle	W. K. Y. Yeung	·	6.4 km	MPC · JPL
128190	2003 SW_{6}	—	September 16, 2003	Kitt Peak	Spacewatch	·	4.0 km	MPC · JPL
128191	2003 SW_{8}	—	September 17, 2003	Kitt Peak	Spacewatch	·	5.9 km	MPC · JPL
128192	2003 SQ_{11}	—	September 16, 2003	Kitt Peak	Spacewatch	·	3.8 km	MPC · JPL
128193	2003 SA_{13}	—	September 16, 2003	Kitt Peak	Spacewatch	·	7.3 km	MPC · JPL
128194	2003 SP_{14}	—	September 17, 2003	Kitt Peak	Spacewatch	·	5.9 km	MPC · JPL
128195	2003 SC_{17}	—	September 17, 2003	Kitt Peak	Spacewatch	THM	6.3 km	MPC · JPL
128196	2003 SN_{27}	—	September 18, 2003	Palomar	NEAT	VER	4.9 km	MPC · JPL
128197	2003 SR_{35}	—	September 16, 2003	Anderson Mesa	LONEOS	CYB	7.3 km	MPC · JPL
128198	2003 SR_{39}	—	September 16, 2003	Palomar	NEAT	HIL · 3:2	11 km	MPC · JPL
128199	2003 SP_{43}	—	September 16, 2003	Anderson Mesa	LONEOS	EOS	3.6 km	MPC · JPL
128200	2003 SE_{45}	—	September 16, 2003	Anderson Mesa	LONEOS	KOR	2.4 km	MPC · JPL

== 128201–128300 ==
back to top

Designation			Discovery			Properties		Ref
Permanent	Provisional	Named after	Date	Site	Discoverer(s)	Category	Diam.	Ref
128201	2003 SZ_{46}	—	September 16, 2003	Anderson Mesa	LONEOS	·	5.2 km	MPC · JPL
128202	2003 SX_{47}	—	September 18, 2003	Palomar	NEAT	HYG	5.2 km	MPC · JPL
128203	2003 SN_{52}	—	September 18, 2003	Palomar	NEAT	T_{j} (2.97)	6.7 km	MPC · JPL
128204	2003 SX_{53}	—	September 16, 2003	Socorro	LINEAR	·	6.8 km	MPC · JPL
128205	2003 SW_{56}	—	September 16, 2003	Kitt Peak	Spacewatch	·	5.6 km	MPC · JPL
128206	2003 SU_{58}	—	September 17, 2003	Anderson Mesa	LONEOS	·	6.7 km	MPC · JPL
128207	2003 SL_{61}	—	September 17, 2003	Socorro	LINEAR	·	5.2 km	MPC · JPL
128208	2003 SZ_{62}	—	September 17, 2003	Kitt Peak	Spacewatch	CYB	7.3 km	MPC · JPL
128209	2003 SS_{65}	—	September 18, 2003	Anderson Mesa	LONEOS	3:2	8.1 km	MPC · JPL
128210	2003 SJ_{67}	—	September 19, 2003	Socorro	LINEAR	·	5.6 km	MPC · JPL
128211	2003 SG_{70}	—	September 17, 2003	Kitt Peak	Spacewatch	EOS	4.7 km	MPC · JPL
128212	2003 SC_{73}	—	September 18, 2003	Kitt Peak	Spacewatch	·	5.0 km	MPC · JPL
128213	2003 SK_{73}	—	September 18, 2003	Kitt Peak	Spacewatch	·	3.6 km	MPC · JPL
128214	2003 SF_{75}	—	September 18, 2003	Kitt Peak	Spacewatch	KOR	2.7 km	MPC · JPL
128215	2003 SL_{77}	—	September 19, 2003	Kitt Peak	Spacewatch	·	4.7 km	MPC · JPL
128216	2003 SS_{77}	—	September 19, 2003	Kitt Peak	Spacewatch	·	5.5 km	MPC · JPL
128217	2003 SN_{79}	—	September 19, 2003	Kitt Peak	Spacewatch	·	4.9 km	MPC · JPL
128218	2003 SX_{79}	—	September 19, 2003	Kitt Peak	Spacewatch	HYG	4.9 km	MPC · JPL
128219	2003 SP_{82}	—	September 18, 2003	Socorro	LINEAR	KOR	2.9 km	MPC · JPL
128220	2003 SN_{88}	—	September 18, 2003	Campo Imperatore	CINEOS	KOR	3.2 km	MPC · JPL
128221	2003 SZ_{99}	—	September 20, 2003	Kitt Peak	Spacewatch	·	3.6 km	MPC · JPL
128222	2003 SP_{101}	—	September 20, 2003	Palomar	NEAT	·	4.3 km	MPC · JPL
128223	2003 SG_{102}	—	September 20, 2003	Kitt Peak	Spacewatch	·	6.2 km	MPC · JPL
128224	2003 SZ_{102}	—	September 20, 2003	Socorro	LINEAR	URS	8.8 km	MPC · JPL
128225	2003 SP_{106}	—	September 20, 2003	Kitt Peak	Spacewatch	·	7.5 km	MPC · JPL
128226	2003 SB_{114}	—	September 16, 2003	Palomar	NEAT	HYG · fast	4.3 km	MPC · JPL
128227	2003 SG_{114}	—	September 16, 2003	Socorro	LINEAR	·	3.4 km	MPC · JPL
128228 Williammarsh	2003 SV_{123}	Williammarsh	September 18, 2003	Goodricke-Pigott	R. A. Tucker	·	4.2 km	MPC · JPL
128229	2003 SO_{125}	—	September 19, 2003	Socorro	LINEAR	·	2.9 km	MPC · JPL
128230	2003 SQ_{126}	—	September 19, 2003	Haleakala	NEAT	·	6.9 km	MPC · JPL
128231	2003 SH_{140}	—	September 19, 2003	Palomar	NEAT	·	7.1 km	MPC · JPL
128232	2003 SO_{146}	—	September 20, 2003	Palomar	NEAT	EOS	4.8 km	MPC · JPL
128233	2003 SD_{148}	—	September 16, 2003	Socorro	LINEAR	·	3.9 km	MPC · JPL
128234	2003 SC_{149}	—	September 16, 2003	Kitt Peak	Spacewatch	·	3.9 km	MPC · JPL
128235	2003 ST_{150}	—	September 17, 2003	Socorro	LINEAR	3:2	11 km	MPC · JPL
128236	2003 SC_{151}	—	September 17, 2003	Socorro	LINEAR	·	4.8 km	MPC · JPL
128237	2003 SZ_{151}	—	September 18, 2003	Kitt Peak	Spacewatch	THM	5.0 km	MPC · JPL
128238	2003 SL_{154}	—	September 19, 2003	Anderson Mesa	LONEOS	EOS	3.7 km	MPC · JPL
128239	2003 SX_{154}	—	September 19, 2003	Anderson Mesa	LONEOS	·	7.4 km	MPC · JPL
128240	2003 SK_{165}	—	September 20, 2003	Anderson Mesa	LONEOS	·	4.0 km	MPC · JPL
128241	2003 SO_{166}	—	September 21, 2003	Kitt Peak	Spacewatch	TEL	2.6 km	MPC · JPL
128242 Šmahel	2003 SF_{171}	Šmahel	September 22, 2003	Kleť	KLENOT	·	3.2 km	MPC · JPL
128243	2003 SO_{173}	—	September 18, 2003	Socorro	LINEAR	CYB	5.6 km	MPC · JPL
128244	2003 SZ_{175}	—	September 18, 2003	Palomar	NEAT	EOS	3.9 km	MPC · JPL
128245	2003 SU_{176}	—	September 18, 2003	Palomar	NEAT	·	7.7 km	MPC · JPL
128246	2003 SC_{177}	—	September 18, 2003	Palomar	NEAT	KOR	2.4 km	MPC · JPL
128247	2003 SW_{203}	—	September 22, 2003	Anderson Mesa	LONEOS	·	4.9 km	MPC · JPL
128248	2003 SD_{216}	—	September 25, 2003	Haleakala	NEAT	THM	6.9 km	MPC · JPL
128249	2003 SR_{236}	—	September 26, 2003	Socorro	LINEAR	·	5.2 km	MPC · JPL
128250	2003 SB_{238}	—	September 27, 2003	Anderson Mesa	LONEOS	EOS	5.3 km	MPC · JPL
128251	2003 SA_{247}	—	September 26, 2003	Socorro	LINEAR	EOS	4.0 km	MPC · JPL
128252	2003 SG_{249}	—	September 26, 2003	Socorro	LINEAR	KOR	2.6 km	MPC · JPL
128253	2003 SU_{258}	—	September 28, 2003	Kitt Peak	Spacewatch	·	5.0 km	MPC · JPL
128254	2003 SL_{259}	—	September 28, 2003	Kitt Peak	Spacewatch	T_{j} (2.99) · 3:2 · SHU	9.3 km	MPC · JPL
128255	2003 SG_{270}	—	September 24, 2003	Haleakala	NEAT	·	5.0 km	MPC · JPL
128256	2003 SG_{284}	—	September 20, 2003	Socorro	LINEAR	VER	5.0 km	MPC · JPL
128257	2003 SG_{292}	—	September 25, 2003	Palomar	NEAT	·	4.3 km	MPC · JPL
128258	2003 SF_{297}	—	September 18, 2003	Haleakala	NEAT	HOF	3.8 km	MPC · JPL
128259	2003 SQ_{297}	—	September 18, 2003	Haleakala	NEAT	T_{j} (2.95)	8.8 km	MPC · JPL
128260	2003 SP_{298}	—	September 18, 2003	Haleakala	NEAT	·	6.0 km	MPC · JPL
128261	2003 SX_{298}	—	September 18, 2003	Haleakala	NEAT	·	1.3 km	MPC · JPL
128262	2003 SL_{301}	—	September 17, 2003	Palomar	NEAT	KOR	2.5 km	MPC · JPL
128263	2003 SL_{303}	—	September 17, 2003	Palomar	NEAT	·	5.7 km	MPC · JPL
128264	2003 SZ_{303}	—	September 17, 2003	Palomar	NEAT	EOS	5.9 km	MPC · JPL
128265	2003 SF_{304}	—	September 17, 2003	Palomar	NEAT	·	7.5 km	MPC · JPL
128266	2003 TB_{1}	—	October 4, 2003	Kingsnake	J. V. McClusky	·	9.1 km	MPC · JPL
128267	2003 TM_{6}	—	October 1, 2003	Anderson Mesa	LONEOS	(21885)	7.3 km	MPC · JPL
128268	2003 TB_{7}	—	October 1, 2003	Anderson Mesa	LONEOS	·	9.2 km	MPC · JPL
128269	2003 TD_{14}	—	October 5, 2003	Socorro	LINEAR	URS	8.9 km	MPC · JPL
128270	2003 TV_{49}	—	October 3, 2003	Haleakala	NEAT	EOS	4.1 km	MPC · JPL
128271	2003 UY_{3}	—	October 16, 2003	Kitt Peak	Spacewatch	·	3.8 km	MPC · JPL
128272	2003 UD_{38}	—	October 17, 2003	Kitt Peak	Spacewatch	·	2.2 km	MPC · JPL
128273	2003 UC_{52}	—	October 18, 2003	Palomar	NEAT	·	3.2 km	MPC · JPL
128274	2003 UB_{58}	—	October 16, 2003	Kitt Peak	Spacewatch	·	5.0 km	MPC · JPL
128275	2003 UJ_{63}	—	October 16, 2003	Palomar	NEAT	·	4.9 km	MPC · JPL
128276	2003 UM_{74}	—	October 17, 2003	Kitt Peak	Spacewatch	·	3.3 km	MPC · JPL
128277	2003 UR_{119}	—	October 18, 2003	Palomar	NEAT	526	5.4 km	MPC · JPL
128278	2003 UL_{134}	—	October 20, 2003	Palomar	NEAT	·	5.7 km	MPC · JPL
128279	2003 UG_{137}	—	October 21, 2003	Socorro	LINEAR	·	4.0 km	MPC · JPL
128280	2003 UE_{139}	—	October 16, 2003	Palomar	NEAT	·	6.4 km	MPC · JPL
128281	2003 UQ_{145}	—	October 18, 2003	Anderson Mesa	LONEOS	KOR	2.8 km	MPC · JPL
128282	2003 UR_{156}	—	October 20, 2003	Socorro	LINEAR	·	3.8 km	MPC · JPL
128283	2003 UY_{166}	—	October 22, 2003	Socorro	LINEAR	EOS	4.6 km	MPC · JPL
128284	2003 UZ_{167}	—	October 22, 2003	Socorro	LINEAR	·	5.9 km	MPC · JPL
128285	2003 UE_{183}	—	October 21, 2003	Palomar	NEAT	·	3.0 km	MPC · JPL
128286	2003 UC_{187}	—	October 22, 2003	Palomar	NEAT	EOS	4.3 km	MPC · JPL
128287	2003 UZ_{196}	—	October 21, 2003	Kitt Peak	Spacewatch	·	3.8 km	MPC · JPL
128288	2003 UZ_{209}	—	October 23, 2003	Anderson Mesa	LONEOS	·	3.8 km	MPC · JPL
128289	2003 US_{254}	—	October 24, 2003	Kitt Peak	Spacewatch	·	3.5 km	MPC · JPL
128290	2003 UR_{258}	—	October 25, 2003	Kitt Peak	Spacewatch	THM	5.2 km	MPC · JPL
128291	2003 UV_{258}	—	October 25, 2003	Socorro	LINEAR	·	9.5 km	MPC · JPL
128292	2003 WR_{39}	—	November 19, 2003	Kitt Peak	Spacewatch	EMA	7.2 km	MPC · JPL
128293	2003 WM_{84}	—	November 19, 2003	Palomar	NEAT	EUP	8.9 km	MPC · JPL
128294	2003 WM_{95}	—	November 19, 2003	Anderson Mesa	LONEOS	KOR	3.3 km	MPC · JPL
128295	2003 WD_{111}	—	November 20, 2003	Socorro	LINEAR	3:2	5.3 km	MPC · JPL
128296	2003 WH_{153}	—	November 26, 2003	Anderson Mesa	LONEOS	·	7.5 km	MPC · JPL
128297 Ashlevi	2003 XD_{11}	Ashlevi	December 13, 2003	Wrightwood	J. W. Young	KOR	2.3 km	MPC · JPL
128298	2003 XR_{38}	—	December 4, 2003	Socorro	LINEAR	·	3.1 km	MPC · JPL
128299	2003 YL_{61}	—	December 19, 2003	Socorro	LINEAR	L5	27 km	MPC · JPL
128300	2003 YH_{80}	—	December 18, 2003	Socorro	LINEAR	·	2.6 km	MPC · JPL

== 128301–128400 ==
back to top

Designation			Discovery			Properties		Ref
Permanent	Provisional	Named after	Date	Site	Discoverer(s)	Category	Diam.	Ref
128301	2003 YZ_{139}	—	December 28, 2003	Socorro	LINEAR	L5	18 km	MPC · JPL
128302	2004 AR_{9}	—	January 15, 2004	Sandlot	G. Hug	·	1.2 km	MPC · JPL
128303	2004 AS_{26}	—	January 13, 2004	Anderson Mesa	LONEOS	·	5.4 km	MPC · JPL
128304	2004 BV_{10}	—	January 17, 2004	Haleakala	NEAT	·	3.7 km	MPC · JPL
128305	2004 BL_{47}	—	January 21, 2004	Socorro	LINEAR	EOS	5.4 km	MPC · JPL
128306	2004 BD_{55}	—	January 22, 2004	Socorro	LINEAR	·	1.9 km	MPC · JPL
128307	2004 BV_{56}	—	January 23, 2004	Anderson Mesa	LONEOS	·	2.5 km	MPC · JPL
128308	2004 BV_{72}	—	January 23, 2004	Socorro	LINEAR	·	2.7 km	MPC · JPL
128309	2004 BV_{93}	—	January 28, 2004	Socorro	LINEAR	·	2.1 km	MPC · JPL
128310	2004 BM_{114}	—	January 29, 2004	Anderson Mesa	LONEOS	·	2.0 km	MPC · JPL
128311	2004 CG_{74}	—	February 11, 2004	Palomar	NEAT	(22805)	7.8 km	MPC · JPL
128312	2004 CN_{75}	—	February 11, 2004	Kitt Peak	Spacewatch	·	3.4 km	MPC · JPL
128313	2004 CB_{95}	—	February 12, 2004	Palomar	NEAT	CYB	6.3 km	MPC · JPL
128314 Coraliejackman	2004 CB_{109}	Coraliejackman	February 15, 2004	Catalina	CSS	·	4.2 km	MPC · JPL
128315 Dereknelson	2004 DK_{22}	Dereknelson	February 17, 2004	Catalina	CSS	·	1.9 km	MPC · JPL
128316	2004 DG_{42}	—	February 19, 2004	Socorro	LINEAR	·	1.3 km	MPC · JPL
128317	2004 DO_{44}	—	February 17, 2004	Kitt Peak	Spacewatch	·	5.6 km	MPC · JPL
128318	2004 ER_{18}	—	March 14, 2004	Socorro	LINEAR	·	2.9 km	MPC · JPL
128319	2004 EF_{25}	—	March 15, 2004	Socorro	LINEAR	·	2.0 km	MPC · JPL
128320	2004 EX_{35}	—	March 13, 2004	Palomar	NEAT	·	2.9 km	MPC · JPL
128321 Philipdumont	2004 EF_{43}	Philipdumont	March 15, 2004	Catalina	CSS	·	1.9 km	MPC · JPL
128322	2004 EH_{60}	—	March 15, 2004	Palomar	NEAT	·	1.4 km	MPC · JPL
128323 Peterwolff	2004 ES_{72}	Peterwolff	March 15, 2004	Catalina	CSS	·	1.4 km	MPC · JPL
128324	2004 EQ_{79}	—	March 15, 2004	Kitt Peak	Spacewatch	·	1.3 km	MPC · JPL
128325	2004 EF_{115}	—	March 14, 2004	Kitt Peak	Spacewatch	KOR	2.3 km	MPC · JPL
128326	2004 FN	—	March 16, 2004	Socorro	LINEAR	H	830 m	MPC · JPL
128327 Ericcarranza	2004 FP_{14}	Ericcarranza	March 16, 2004	Catalina	CSS	H	790 m	MPC · JPL
128328	2004 FU_{15}	—	March 20, 2004	Siding Spring	SSS	H	940 m	MPC · JPL
128329	2004 FK_{21}	—	March 16, 2004	Kitt Peak	Spacewatch	·	1.2 km	MPC · JPL
128330	2004 FX_{27}	—	March 17, 2004	Kitt Peak	Spacewatch	NYS	1.7 km	MPC · JPL
128331	2004 FM_{46}	—	March 17, 2004	Socorro	LINEAR	·	840 m	MPC · JPL
128332	2004 FC_{50}	—	March 18, 2004	Socorro	LINEAR	·	1.9 km	MPC · JPL
128333	2004 FL_{55}	—	March 19, 2004	Socorro	LINEAR	KOR	2.4 km	MPC · JPL
128334	2004 FO_{65}	—	March 19, 2004	Socorro	LINEAR	·	1.3 km	MPC · JPL
128335	2004 FP_{79}	—	March 20, 2004	Socorro	LINEAR	(5)	2.6 km	MPC · JPL
128336	2004 FP_{107}	—	March 20, 2004	Socorro	LINEAR	·	1.6 km	MPC · JPL
128337	2004 FD_{111}	—	March 25, 2004	Anderson Mesa	LONEOS	·	1.8 km	MPC · JPL
128338	2004 FQ_{111}	—	March 26, 2004	Socorro	LINEAR	·	2.0 km	MPC · JPL
128339	2004 FP_{118}	—	March 22, 2004	Socorro	LINEAR	·	1.7 km	MPC · JPL
128340	2004 FM_{121}	—	March 23, 2004	Socorro	LINEAR	·	3.0 km	MPC · JPL
128341 Dalestanbridge	2004 FR_{128}	Dalestanbridge	March 27, 2004	Catalina	CSS	H	1.1 km	MPC · JPL
128342	2004 FS_{157}	—	March 17, 2004	Kitt Peak	Spacewatch	·	2.4 km	MPC · JPL
128343 Brianpage	2004 GQ_{5}	Brianpage	April 11, 2004	Catalina	CSS	·	2.7 km	MPC · JPL
128344	2004 GW_{7}	—	April 12, 2004	Anderson Mesa	LONEOS	·	1.1 km	MPC · JPL
128345 Danielbamberger	2004 GY_{18}	Danielbamberger	April 15, 2004	Emerald Lane	L. Ball	·	2.8 km	MPC · JPL
128346	2004 GQ_{19}	—	April 15, 2004	Palomar	NEAT	H	1.4 km	MPC · JPL
128347	2004 GB_{23}	—	April 12, 2004	Kitt Peak	Spacewatch	·	1.2 km	MPC · JPL
128348 Jasonleonard	2004 GK_{27}	Jasonleonard	April 15, 2004	Catalina	CSS	·	2.8 km	MPC · JPL
128349	2004 GP_{30}	—	April 12, 2004	Anderson Mesa	LONEOS	·	3.0 km	MPC · JPL
128350	2004 GE_{31}	—	April 13, 2004	Palomar	NEAT	·	2.9 km	MPC · JPL
128351	2004 GD_{35}	—	April 13, 2004	Kitt Peak	Spacewatch	·	870 m	MPC · JPL
128352	2004 GY_{37}	—	April 14, 2004	Palomar	NEAT	·	1.9 km	MPC · JPL
128353	2004 GK_{39}	—	April 15, 2004	Anderson Mesa	LONEOS	·	1.7 km	MPC · JPL
128354	2004 GL_{42}	—	April 14, 2004	Kitt Peak	Spacewatch	·	2.4 km	MPC · JPL
128355	2004 GE_{66}	—	April 13, 2004	Kitt Peak	Spacewatch	MAS	880 m	MPC · JPL
128356	2004 GD_{76}	—	April 15, 2004	Kitt Peak	Spacewatch	·	2.3 km	MPC · JPL
128357	2004 HV_{2}	—	April 16, 2004	Anderson Mesa	LONEOS	EUN	1.9 km	MPC · JPL
128358	2004 HS_{4}	—	April 16, 2004	Socorro	LINEAR	·	1.4 km	MPC · JPL
128359	2004 HV_{4}	—	April 16, 2004	Socorro	LINEAR	·	2.8 km	MPC · JPL
128360	2004 HK_{18}	—	April 17, 2004	Socorro	LINEAR	(5)	2.5 km	MPC · JPL
128361	2004 HP_{18}	—	April 17, 2004	Palomar	NEAT	·	1.6 km	MPC · JPL
128362	2004 HW_{19}	—	April 20, 2004	Kitt Peak	Spacewatch	·	1.5 km	MPC · JPL
128363	2004 HL_{28}	—	April 20, 2004	Socorro	LINEAR	·	1.9 km	MPC · JPL
128364	2004 HM_{29}	—	April 21, 2004	Kitt Peak	Spacewatch	·	1.5 km	MPC · JPL
128365	2004 HJ_{44}	—	April 21, 2004	Socorro	LINEAR	·	1.3 km	MPC · JPL
128366	2004 HX_{44}	—	April 21, 2004	Socorro	LINEAR	·	920 m	MPC · JPL
128367	2004 HM_{53}	—	April 25, 2004	Kitt Peak	Spacewatch	·	2.8 km	MPC · JPL
128368	2004 HH_{59}	—	April 25, 2004	Socorro	LINEAR	·	1.2 km	MPC · JPL
128369	2004 HT_{62}	—	April 30, 2004	Kitt Peak	Spacewatch	·	4.0 km	MPC · JPL
128370	2004 HB_{72}	—	April 25, 2004	Kitt Peak	Spacewatch	·	2.1 km	MPC · JPL
128371	2004 HO_{74}	—	April 30, 2004	Kitt Peak	Spacewatch	·	3.7 km	MPC · JPL
128372 Danielwibben	2004 JE_{2}	Danielwibben	May 9, 2004	Catalina	CSS	H	1.1 km	MPC · JPL
128373 Kevinjohnson	2004 JV_{5}	Kevinjohnson	May 12, 2004	Catalina	CSS	·	3.5 km	MPC · JPL
128374	2004 JW_{26}	—	May 15, 2004	Socorro	LINEAR	·	980 m	MPC · JPL
128375	2004 JO_{27}	—	May 15, 2004	Socorro	LINEAR	·	2.3 km	MPC · JPL
128376	2004 JS_{27}	—	May 15, 2004	Socorro	LINEAR	·	1.9 km	MPC · JPL
128377	2004 JB_{28}	—	May 12, 2004	Siding Spring	SSS	·	4.3 km	MPC · JPL
128378	2004 JB_{29}	—	May 15, 2004	Socorro	LINEAR	·	3.3 km	MPC · JPL
128379	2004 JQ_{33}	—	May 15, 2004	Socorro	LINEAR	·	970 m	MPC · JPL
128380	2004 JF_{34}	—	May 15, 2004	Socorro	LINEAR	·	1.6 km	MPC · JPL
128381	2004 JB_{35}	—	May 15, 2004	Socorro	LINEAR	GEF	2.0 km	MPC · JPL
128382	2004 JH_{35}	—	May 15, 2004	Socorro	LINEAR	·	1.6 km	MPC · JPL
128383	2004 JW_{52}	—	May 9, 2004	Kitt Peak	Spacewatch	L4	10 km	MPC · JPL
128384	2004 KV_{3}	—	May 16, 2004	Socorro	LINEAR	·	1.6 km	MPC · JPL
128385	2004 KD_{4}	—	May 16, 2004	Socorro	LINEAR	·	2.4 km	MPC · JPL
128386	2004 KL_{5}	—	May 16, 2004	Socorro	LINEAR	·	1.7 km	MPC · JPL
128387	2004 KH_{8}	—	May 16, 2004	Socorro	LINEAR	·	4.2 km	MPC · JPL
128388	2004 KD_{13}	—	May 23, 2004	Socorro	LINEAR	H	1.1 km	MPC · JPL
128389 Dougleland	2004 KG_{14}	Dougleland	May 22, 2004	Catalina	CSS	·	5.8 km	MPC · JPL
128390	2004 KQ_{14}	—	May 23, 2004	Kitt Peak	Spacewatch	·	4.5 km	MPC · JPL
128391	2004 LQ	—	June 8, 2004	Palomar	NEAT	PHO	2.7 km	MPC · JPL
128392	2004 LY	—	June 9, 2004	Anderson Mesa	LONEOS	·	6.9 km	MPC · JPL
128393	2004 LE_{3}	—	June 6, 2004	Palomar	NEAT	·	1.5 km	MPC · JPL
128394	2004 LG_{3}	—	June 6, 2004	Palomar	NEAT	KON	5.0 km	MPC · JPL
128395	2004 LE_{5}	—	June 12, 2004	Socorro	LINEAR	·	5.4 km	MPC · JPL
128396	2004 LK_{5}	—	June 12, 2004	Palomar	NEAT	·	2.4 km	MPC · JPL
128397	2004 LL_{5}	—	June 6, 2004	Palomar	NEAT	·	3.4 km	MPC · JPL
128398	2004 LU_{6}	—	June 11, 2004	Socorro	LINEAR	·	1.6 km	MPC · JPL
128399	2004 LO_{7}	—	June 11, 2004	Palomar	NEAT	·	3.6 km	MPC · JPL
128400	2004 LD_{8}	—	June 11, 2004	Socorro	LINEAR	PHO	2.9 km	MPC · JPL

== 128401–128500 ==
back to top

Designation			Discovery			Properties		Ref
Permanent	Provisional	Named after	Date	Site	Discoverer(s)	Category	Diam.	Ref
128401	2004 LO_{9}	—	June 13, 2004	Palomar	NEAT	MIS	4.1 km	MPC · JPL
128402	2004 LS_{9}	—	June 13, 2004	Palomar	NEAT	NYS	1.8 km	MPC · JPL
128403	2004 LT_{10}	—	June 8, 2004	Kitt Peak	Spacewatch	·	1.3 km	MPC · JPL
128404	2004 LU_{13}	—	June 11, 2004	Socorro	LINEAR	(5)	2.8 km	MPC · JPL
128405	2004 LE_{15}	—	June 11, 2004	Socorro	LINEAR	·	3.5 km	MPC · JPL
128406	2004 LF_{15}	—	June 11, 2004	Socorro	LINEAR	·	2.7 km	MPC · JPL
128407	2004 LP_{15}	—	June 12, 2004	Socorro	LINEAR	·	4.0 km	MPC · JPL
128408 Mikehughes	2004 LJ_{16}	Mikehughes	June 12, 2004	Catalina	CSS	·	3.2 km	MPC · JPL
128409	2004 LL_{16}	—	June 12, 2004	Palomar	NEAT	·	3.8 km	MPC · JPL
128410	2004 LM_{16}	—	June 12, 2004	Palomar	NEAT	·	3.0 km	MPC · JPL
128411	2004 LO_{16}	—	June 12, 2004	Siding Spring	SSS	·	2.3 km	MPC · JPL
128412	2004 LZ_{16}	—	June 14, 2004	Socorro	LINEAR	LIX ·	8.6 km	MPC · JPL
128413	2004 LR_{17}	—	June 14, 2004	Socorro	LINEAR	PHO	4.6 km	MPC · JPL
128414	2004 LO_{18}	—	June 12, 2004	Socorro	LINEAR	·	6.3 km	MPC · JPL
128415	2004 LZ_{21}	—	June 13, 2004	Socorro	LINEAR	EUN	2.8 km	MPC · JPL
128416	2004 LC_{22}	—	June 13, 2004	Socorro	LINEAR	·	5.0 km	MPC · JPL
128417 Chrismccaa	2004 LK_{24}	Chrismccaa	June 12, 2004	Catalina	CSS	·	5.5 km	MPC · JPL
128418	2004 LN_{24}	—	June 12, 2004	Anderson Mesa	LONEOS	EUP	7.2 km	MPC · JPL
128419	2004 LK_{29}	—	June 14, 2004	Kitt Peak	Spacewatch	fast	3.1 km	MPC · JPL
128420	2004 MS	—	June 16, 2004	Socorro	LINEAR	3:2	9.0 km	MPC · JPL
128421	2004 MB_{1}	—	June 16, 2004	Socorro	LINEAR	·	2.8 km	MPC · JPL
128422	2004 MC_{1}	—	June 16, 2004	Socorro	LINEAR	MAR	3.7 km	MPC · JPL
128423	2004 MD_{1}	—	June 16, 2004	Socorro	LINEAR	·	5.3 km	MPC · JPL
128424	2004 MM_{1}	—	June 17, 2004	Socorro	LINEAR	H	1.4 km	MPC · JPL
128425	2004 MT_{5}	—	June 20, 2004	Kitt Peak	Spacewatch	·	4.7 km	MPC · JPL
128426 Vekerdi	2004 MP_{6}	Vekerdi	June 18, 2004	Piszkéstető	K. Sárneczky	·	1.2 km	MPC · JPL
128427	2004 MQ_{7}	—	June 28, 2004	Reedy Creek	J. Broughton	·	2.6 km	MPC · JPL
128428	2004 NJ	—	July 8, 2004	Reedy Creek	J. Broughton	·	2.1 km	MPC · JPL
128429	2004 NK	—	July 8, 2004	Reedy Creek	J. Broughton	·	2.3 km	MPC · JPL
128430	2004 NC_{1}	—	July 7, 2004	Campo Imperatore	CINEOS	·	3.2 km	MPC · JPL
128431	2004 NO_{1}	—	July 9, 2004	Socorro	LINEAR	·	2.1 km	MPC · JPL
128432	2004 NX_{1}	—	July 9, 2004	Palomar	NEAT	V	1.2 km	MPC · JPL
128433	2004 NY_{1}	—	July 9, 2004	Palomar	NEAT	·	3.0 km	MPC · JPL
128434	2004 NJ_{2}	—	July 9, 2004	Siding Spring	SSS	PHO	2.4 km	MPC · JPL
128435	2004 NF_{4}	—	July 13, 2004	Palomar	NEAT	·	4.6 km	MPC · JPL
128436	2004 NA_{7}	—	July 11, 2004	Palomar	NEAT	·	3.4 km	MPC · JPL
128437	2004 NQ_{7}	—	July 14, 2004	Socorro	LINEAR	H	1.2 km	MPC · JPL
128438	2004 NY_{9}	—	July 9, 2004	Socorro	LINEAR	·	6.8 km	MPC · JPL
128439 Chriswaters	2004 NA_{11}	Chriswaters	July 10, 2004	Catalina	CSS	·	1.3 km	MPC · JPL
128440	2004 NG_{13}	—	July 11, 2004	Socorro	LINEAR	·	5.2 km	MPC · JPL
128441	2004 NR_{14}	—	July 11, 2004	Socorro	LINEAR	·	2.1 km	MPC · JPL
128442	2004 NE_{15}	—	July 11, 2004	Socorro	LINEAR	·	5.8 km	MPC · JPL
128443	2004 NN_{16}	—	July 11, 2004	Socorro	LINEAR	·	4.3 km	MPC · JPL
128444	2004 NQ_{16}	—	July 11, 2004	Socorro	LINEAR	(5)	2.1 km	MPC · JPL
128445	2004 ND_{20}	—	July 14, 2004	Socorro	LINEAR	PHO	1.9 km	MPC · JPL
128446	2004 NJ_{21}	—	July 15, 2004	Socorro	LINEAR	NYS	2.3 km	MPC · JPL
128447	2004 NZ_{21}	—	July 15, 2004	Socorro	LINEAR	·	2.3 km	MPC · JPL
128448	2004 NU_{23}	—	July 14, 2004	Socorro	LINEAR	·	7.6 km	MPC · JPL
128449	2004 NX_{23}	—	July 14, 2004	Socorro	LINEAR	·	4.9 km	MPC · JPL
128450	2004 NX_{24}	—	July 15, 2004	Socorro	LINEAR	PHO	2.1 km	MPC · JPL
128451	2004 NC_{25}	—	July 15, 2004	Socorro	LINEAR	·	1.9 km	MPC · JPL
128452	2004 NJ_{25}	—	July 15, 2004	Socorro	LINEAR	·	1.7 km	MPC · JPL
128453	2004 NR_{26}	—	July 11, 2004	Socorro	LINEAR	·	3.6 km	MPC · JPL
128454	2004 NX_{26}	—	July 11, 2004	Socorro	LINEAR	·	6.1 km	MPC · JPL
128455	2004 NZ_{27}	—	July 11, 2004	Socorro	LINEAR	V	1.1 km	MPC · JPL
128456	2004 NL_{28}	—	July 11, 2004	Socorro	LINEAR	·	1.6 km	MPC · JPL
128457	2004 NW_{28}	—	July 14, 2004	Socorro	LINEAR	·	2.2 km	MPC · JPL
128458	2004 NE_{29}	—	July 14, 2004	Socorro	LINEAR	·	4.0 km	MPC · JPL
128459	2004 NS_{29}	—	July 14, 2004	Socorro	LINEAR	·	2.8 km	MPC · JPL
128460	2004 NZ_{31}	—	July 15, 2004	Siding Spring	SSS	·	3.3 km	MPC · JPL
128461	2004 OA	—	July 16, 2004	Pla D'Arguines	R. Ferrando	·	3.0 km	MPC · JPL
128462	2004 OU_{4}	—	July 16, 2004	Socorro	LINEAR	·	2.4 km	MPC · JPL
128463	2004 OD_{5}	—	July 16, 2004	Socorro	LINEAR	PAD	3.0 km	MPC · JPL
128464	2004 OZ_{7}	—	July 16, 2004	Socorro	LINEAR	·	5.9 km	MPC · JPL
128465	2004 OJ_{9}	—	July 20, 2004	Great Shefford	Birtwhistle, P.	KOR	2.3 km	MPC · JPL
128466	2004 OH_{10}	—	July 21, 2004	Reedy Creek	J. Broughton	·	3.4 km	MPC · JPL
128467	2004 OH_{11}	—	July 25, 2004	Anderson Mesa	LONEOS	DOR	4.1 km	MPC · JPL
128468	2004 OK_{11}	—	July 25, 2004	Anderson Mesa	LONEOS	·	2.8 km	MPC · JPL
128469	2004 OH_{12}	—	July 28, 2004	Bergisch Gladbach	W. Bickel	THM	3.1 km	MPC · JPL
128470	2004 OX_{12}	—	July 28, 2004	Reedy Creek	J. Broughton	HYG	4.5 km	MPC · JPL
128471	2004 OG_{13}	—	July 16, 2004	Campo Imperatore	CINEOS	·	2.2 km	MPC · JPL
128472	2004 PS	—	August 7, 2004	Palomar	NEAT	·	2.5 km	MPC · JPL
128473	2004 PV	—	August 6, 2004	Palomar	NEAT	·	2.1 km	MPC · JPL
128474 Arbacia	2004 PD_{1}	Arbacia	August 7, 2004	Pla D'Arguines	R. Ferrando	·	4.4 km	MPC · JPL
128475	2004 PW_{1}	—	August 6, 2004	Reedy Creek	J. Broughton	·	4.2 km	MPC · JPL
128476	2004 PE_{3}	—	August 3, 2004	Siding Spring	SSS	·	6.0 km	MPC · JPL
128477	2004 PH_{3}	—	August 3, 2004	Siding Spring	SSS	EOS	3.7 km	MPC · JPL
128478	2004 PU_{3}	—	August 3, 2004	Siding Spring	SSS	·	6.8 km	MPC · JPL
128479	2004 PE_{4}	—	August 4, 2004	Palomar	NEAT	·	4.6 km	MPC · JPL
128480	2004 PK_{4}	—	August 5, 2004	Palomar	NEAT	·	2.1 km	MPC · JPL
128481	2004 PE_{6}	—	August 6, 2004	Palomar	NEAT	·	1.9 km	MPC · JPL
128482	2004 PH_{7}	—	August 6, 2004	Palomar	NEAT	·	5.4 km	MPC · JPL
128483	2004 PV_{8}	—	August 6, 2004	Palomar	NEAT	·	1.5 km	MPC · JPL
128484	2004 PZ_{9}	—	August 6, 2004	Campo Imperatore	CINEOS	·	2.1 km	MPC · JPL
128485	2004 PD_{10}	—	August 6, 2004	Campo Imperatore	CINEOS	·	1.1 km	MPC · JPL
128486	2004 PB_{11}	—	August 7, 2004	Palomar	NEAT	NYS	2.2 km	MPC · JPL
128487	2004 PN_{11}	—	August 7, 2004	Palomar	NEAT	·	1.6 km	MPC · JPL
128488	2004 PX_{12}	—	August 7, 2004	Palomar	NEAT	·	3.9 km	MPC · JPL
128489	2004 PU_{13}	—	August 7, 2004	Palomar	NEAT	MAS	1.5 km	MPC · JPL
128490	2004 PW_{13}	—	August 7, 2004	Palomar	NEAT	·	6.2 km	MPC · JPL
128491	2004 PF_{15}	—	August 7, 2004	Palomar	NEAT	·	1.1 km	MPC · JPL
128492	2004 PH_{15}	—	August 7, 2004	Palomar	NEAT	·	4.6 km	MPC · JPL
128493	2004 PQ_{15}	—	August 7, 2004	Palomar	NEAT	·	2.4 km	MPC · JPL
128494	2004 PE_{16}	—	August 7, 2004	Palomar	NEAT	·	2.0 km	MPC · JPL
128495	2004 PP_{16}	—	August 7, 2004	Palomar	NEAT	·	6.3 km	MPC · JPL
128496	2004 PV_{16}	—	August 7, 2004	Campo Imperatore	CINEOS	·	1.4 km	MPC · JPL
128497	2004 PA_{17}	—	August 7, 2004	Campo Imperatore	CINEOS	·	3.9 km	MPC · JPL
128498	2004 PB_{17}	—	August 8, 2004	Campo Imperatore	CINEOS	·	2.2 km	MPC · JPL
128499	2004 PH_{17}	—	August 8, 2004	Campo Imperatore	CINEOS	KOR	2.2 km	MPC · JPL
128500	2004 PJ_{17}	—	August 8, 2004	Campo Imperatore	CINEOS	·	3.6 km	MPC · JPL

== 128501–128600 ==
back to top

Designation			Discovery			Properties		Ref
Permanent	Provisional	Named after	Date	Site	Discoverer(s)	Category	Diam.	Ref
128501	2004 PO_{17}	—	August 8, 2004	Socorro	LINEAR	·	6.0 km	MPC · JPL
128502	2004 PD_{18}	—	August 8, 2004	Anderson Mesa	LONEOS	·	2.8 km	MPC · JPL
128503	2004 PF_{18}	—	August 8, 2004	Anderson Mesa	LONEOS	·	7.0 km	MPC · JPL
128504	2004 PP_{18}	—	August 8, 2004	Anderson Mesa	LONEOS	·	1.3 km	MPC · JPL
128505	2004 PK_{19}	—	August 8, 2004	Anderson Mesa	LONEOS	·	2.5 km	MPC · JPL
128506	2004 PF_{30}	—	August 8, 2004	Campo Imperatore	CINEOS	·	3.7 km	MPC · JPL
128507	2004 PO_{31}	—	August 8, 2004	Socorro	LINEAR	·	4.3 km	MPC · JPL
128508	2004 PJ_{33}	—	August 8, 2004	Socorro	LINEAR	·	1.9 km	MPC · JPL
128509	2004 PS_{34}	—	August 8, 2004	Anderson Mesa	LONEOS	·	5.1 km	MPC · JPL
128510	2004 PA_{35}	—	August 8, 2004	Palomar	NEAT	·	2.0 km	MPC · JPL
128511	2004 PO_{37}	—	August 9, 2004	Anderson Mesa	LONEOS	·	2.7 km	MPC · JPL
128512	2004 PS_{37}	—	August 9, 2004	Socorro	LINEAR	·	2.0 km	MPC · JPL
128513	2004 PU_{37}	—	August 9, 2004	Socorro	LINEAR	DOR	5.8 km	MPC · JPL
128514	2004 PC_{38}	—	August 9, 2004	Socorro	LINEAR	·	5.6 km	MPC · JPL
128515	2004 PR_{38}	—	August 9, 2004	Socorro	LINEAR	·	1.6 km	MPC · JPL
128516	2004 PS_{38}	—	August 9, 2004	Socorro	LINEAR	THM	2.9 km	MPC · JPL
128517	2004 PX_{38}	—	August 9, 2004	Anderson Mesa	LONEOS	·	1.9 km	MPC · JPL
128518	2004 PE_{39}	—	August 9, 2004	Anderson Mesa	LONEOS	·	1.2 km	MPC · JPL
128519	2004 PV_{40}	—	August 9, 2004	Socorro	LINEAR	·	1.4 km	MPC · JPL
128520	2004 PZ_{40}	—	August 9, 2004	Socorro	LINEAR	·	2.1 km	MPC · JPL
128521	2004 PA_{41}	—	August 9, 2004	Socorro	LINEAR	·	1.1 km	MPC · JPL
128522	2004 PD_{42}	—	August 9, 2004	Socorro	LINEAR	TIR	5.1 km	MPC · JPL
128523 Johnmuir	2004 PX_{42}	Johnmuir	August 11, 2004	Francisquito	Jones, R. E.	·	1.6 km	MPC · JPL
128524	2004 PR_{43}	—	August 6, 2004	Palomar	NEAT	·	4.6 km	MPC · JPL
128525	2004 PD_{48}	—	August 8, 2004	Socorro	LINEAR	MAR	2.7 km	MPC · JPL
128526	2004 PX_{48}	—	August 8, 2004	Socorro	LINEAR	·	1.7 km	MPC · JPL
128527	2004 PV_{49}	—	August 8, 2004	Socorro	LINEAR	(13314)	3.9 km	MPC · JPL
128528	2004 PY_{49}	—	August 8, 2004	Socorro	LINEAR	NYS	1.8 km	MPC · JPL
128529	2004 PT_{52}	—	August 8, 2004	Socorro	LINEAR	·	2.7 km	MPC · JPL
128530	2004 PW_{52}	—	August 8, 2004	Socorro	LINEAR	TIR	3.0 km	MPC · JPL
128531	2004 PY_{52}	—	August 8, 2004	Socorro	LINEAR	·	1.9 km	MPC · JPL
128532	2004 PG_{56}	—	August 9, 2004	Campo Imperatore	CINEOS	ADE	3.1 km	MPC · JPL
128533	2004 PS_{56}	—	August 9, 2004	Socorro	LINEAR	·	2.4 km	MPC · JPL
128534	2004 PV_{57}	—	August 9, 2004	Socorro	LINEAR	·	1.6 km	MPC · JPL
128535	2004 PY_{58}	—	August 9, 2004	Socorro	LINEAR	·	3.4 km	MPC · JPL
128536	2004 PG_{59}	—	August 9, 2004	Socorro	LINEAR	·	1.9 km	MPC · JPL
128537	2004 PS_{59}	—	August 9, 2004	Anderson Mesa	LONEOS	·	2.0 km	MPC · JPL
128538	2004 PU_{60}	—	August 9, 2004	Socorro	LINEAR	·	1.8 km	MPC · JPL
128539	2004 PD_{65}	—	August 10, 2004	Socorro	LINEAR	·	1.0 km	MPC · JPL
128540	2004 PV_{65}	—	August 10, 2004	Anderson Mesa	LONEOS	·	3.3 km	MPC · JPL
128541	2004 PC_{66}	—	August 8, 2004	Socorro	LINEAR	MAS	1.4 km	MPC · JPL
128542	2004 PT_{66}	—	August 9, 2004	Socorro	LINEAR	PHO	2.1 km	MPC · JPL
128543	2004 PO_{67}	—	August 5, 2004	Palomar	NEAT	·	8.6 km	MPC · JPL
128544	2004 PV_{67}	—	August 6, 2004	Palomar	NEAT	·	3.8 km	MPC · JPL
128545	2004 PJ_{68}	—	August 6, 2004	Palomar	NEAT	·	2.2 km	MPC · JPL
128546	2004 PF_{72}	—	August 8, 2004	Socorro	LINEAR	HYG	5.2 km	MPC · JPL
128547	2004 PN_{72}	—	August 8, 2004	Socorro	LINEAR	·	3.3 km	MPC · JPL
128548	2004 PY_{72}	—	August 8, 2004	Socorro	LINEAR	·	5.6 km	MPC · JPL
128549	2004 PZ_{72}	—	August 8, 2004	Socorro	LINEAR	V	1.6 km	MPC · JPL
128550	2004 PL_{73}	—	August 8, 2004	Socorro	LINEAR	·	1.8 km	MPC · JPL
128551	2004 PW_{75}	—	August 9, 2004	Campo Imperatore	CINEOS	·	4.6 km	MPC · JPL
128552	2004 PA_{77}	—	August 9, 2004	Socorro	LINEAR	CYB	4.8 km	MPC · JPL
128553	2004 PF_{77}	—	August 9, 2004	Socorro	LINEAR	·	1.9 km	MPC · JPL
128554	2004 PL_{79}	—	August 9, 2004	Socorro	LINEAR	V	1.3 km	MPC · JPL
128555	2004 PO_{79}	—	August 9, 2004	Socorro	LINEAR	·	1.2 km	MPC · JPL
128556	2004 PG_{83}	—	August 10, 2004	Socorro	LINEAR	·	4.1 km	MPC · JPL
128557	2004 PX_{83}	—	August 10, 2004	Socorro	LINEAR	V	1.1 km	MPC · JPL
128558	2004 PT_{85}	—	August 10, 2004	Socorro	LINEAR	MAR	2.3 km	MPC · JPL
128559	2004 PJ_{88}	—	August 11, 2004	Socorro	LINEAR	·	2.7 km	MPC · JPL
128560	2004 PL_{88}	—	August 11, 2004	Socorro	LINEAR	·	1.2 km	MPC · JPL
128561	2004 PK_{90}	—	August 10, 2004	Anderson Mesa	LONEOS	EOS	4.2 km	MPC · JPL
128562 Murdin	2004 PM_{90}	Murdin	August 10, 2004	Anderson Mesa	LONEOS	GEF	2.0 km	MPC · JPL
128563	2004 PS_{90}	—	August 10, 2004	Socorro	LINEAR	·	6.4 km	MPC · JPL
128564	2004 PX_{90}	—	August 10, 2004	Socorro	LINEAR	·	2.5 km	MPC · JPL
128565	2004 PY_{92}	—	August 11, 2004	Reedy Creek	J. Broughton	·	3.4 km	MPC · JPL
128566	2004 PZ_{92}	—	August 11, 2004	Reedy Creek	J. Broughton	·	4.3 km	MPC · JPL
128567	2004 PJ_{93}	—	August 11, 2004	Socorro	LINEAR	(5)	2.3 km	MPC · JPL
128568	2004 PK_{94}	—	August 10, 2004	Socorro	LINEAR	·	2.0 km	MPC · JPL
128569	2004 PM_{97}	—	August 12, 2004	Socorro	LINEAR	·	3.0 km	MPC · JPL
128570	2004 PV_{99}	—	August 11, 2004	Socorro	LINEAR	·	2.4 km	MPC · JPL
128571	2004 PB_{100}	—	August 11, 2004	Siding Spring	SSS	MAR	2.0 km	MPC · JPL
128572	2004 PN_{101}	—	August 11, 2004	Socorro	LINEAR	·	10 km	MPC · JPL
128573	2004 PO_{101}	—	August 11, 2004	Socorro	LINEAR	V	1.3 km	MPC · JPL
128574	2004 PX_{101}	—	August 11, 2004	Socorro	LINEAR	·	5.3 km	MPC · JPL
128575	2004 PL_{102}	—	August 12, 2004	Socorro	LINEAR	·	3.5 km	MPC · JPL
128576	2004 PB_{104}	—	August 12, 2004	Socorro	LINEAR	·	9.4 km	MPC · JPL
128577	2004 PO_{104}	—	August 15, 2004	Siding Spring	SSS	·	10 km	MPC · JPL
128578	2004 PW_{104}	—	August 15, 2004	Reedy Creek	J. Broughton	EOS	3.3 km	MPC · JPL
128579	2004 PH_{105}	—	August 9, 2004	Siding Spring	SSS	PHO	2.7 km	MPC · JPL
128580	2004 PT_{105}	—	August 14, 2004	Palomar	NEAT	·	4.3 km	MPC · JPL
128581	2004 PX_{105}	—	August 15, 2004	Siding Spring	SSS	RAF	1.2 km	MPC · JPL
128582	2004 PC_{106}	—	August 15, 2004	Siding Spring	SSS	·	3.9 km	MPC · JPL
128583	2004 PU_{108}	—	August 10, 2004	Socorro	LINEAR	·	1.9 km	MPC · JPL
128584	2004 PR_{112}	—	August 8, 2004	Socorro	LINEAR	·	2.9 km	MPC · JPL
128585 Alfredmaria	2004 QV	Alfredmaria	August 18, 2004	Altschwendt	W. Ries	·	2.4 km	MPC · JPL
128586 Jeremias	2004 QW	Jeremias	August 16, 2004	Altschwendt	W. Ries	·	6.7 km	MPC · JPL
128587	2004 QU_{1}	—	August 19, 2004	Socorro	LINEAR	·	4.4 km	MPC · JPL
128588	2004 QW_{1}	—	August 19, 2004	Socorro	LINEAR	·	2.6 km	MPC · JPL
128589	2004 QY_{1}	—	August 19, 2004	Socorro	LINEAR	·	7.0 km	MPC · JPL
128590	2004 QO_{3}	—	August 19, 2004	Socorro	LINEAR	·	2.4 km	MPC · JPL
128591	2004 QD_{4}	—	August 19, 2004	Siding Spring	SSS	V	1.0 km	MPC · JPL
128592	2004 QM_{5}	—	August 21, 2004	Reedy Creek	J. Broughton	·	2.4 km	MPC · JPL
128593 Balfourwhitney	2004 QU_{6}	Balfourwhitney	August 20, 2004	Goodricke-Pigott	R. A. Tucker	AEO	2.8 km	MPC · JPL
128594	2004 QJ_{8}	—	August 16, 2004	Siding Spring	SSS	EUN	2.2 km	MPC · JPL
128595	2004 QK_{10}	—	August 21, 2004	Siding Spring	SSS	·	4.2 km	MPC · JPL
128596	2004 QS_{10}	—	August 21, 2004	Siding Spring	SSS	EOS	3.1 km	MPC · JPL
128597	2004 QA_{11}	—	August 21, 2004	Siding Spring	SSS	EUN	1.6 km	MPC · JPL
128598	2004 QO_{11}	—	August 21, 2004	Siding Spring	SSS	·	1.8 km	MPC · JPL
128599	2004 QP_{11}	—	August 21, 2004	Siding Spring	SSS	·	1.1 km	MPC · JPL
128600	2004 QT_{11}	—	August 21, 2004	Siding Spring	SSS	·	1.2 km	MPC · JPL

== 128601–128700 ==
back to top

Designation			Discovery			Properties		Ref
Permanent	Provisional	Named after	Date	Site	Discoverer(s)	Category	Diam.	Ref
128601	2004 QS_{12}	—	August 21, 2004	Siding Spring	SSS	·	3.9 km	MPC · JPL
128602 Careyparish	2004 QL_{13}	Careyparish	August 21, 2004	Catalina	CSS	·	3.6 km	MPC · JPL
128603	2004 QP_{13}	—	August 22, 2004	Kvistaberg	Uppsala-DLR Asteroid Survey	EOS	3.4 km	MPC · JPL
128604 Markfisher	2004 QO_{14}	Markfisher	August 21, 2004	Catalina	CSS	·	4.4 km	MPC · JPL
128605	2004 QF_{15}	—	August 22, 2004	Kitt Peak	Spacewatch	GEF	2.2 km	MPC · JPL
128606	2004 QY_{17}	—	August 19, 2004	Socorro	LINEAR	EUN	2.2 km	MPC · JPL
128607 Richhund	2004 QJ_{18}	Richhund	August 20, 2004	Catalina	CSS	·	1.4 km	MPC · JPL
128608 Chucklove	2004 QR_{18}	Chucklove	August 21, 2004	Catalina	CSS	·	1.1 km	MPC · JPL
128609	2004 QB_{19}	—	August 22, 2004	Kvistaberg	Uppsala-DLR Asteroid Survey	VER	6.8 km	MPC · JPL
128610 Stasiahabenicht	2004 QR_{20}	Stasiahabenicht	August 20, 2004	Catalina	CSS	·	3.6 km	MPC · JPL
128611 Paulnowak	2004 QB_{21}	Paulnowak	August 20, 2004	Catalina	CSS	·	2.8 km	MPC · JPL
128612	2004 QW_{21}	—	August 25, 2004	Kitt Peak	Spacewatch	·	5.0 km	MPC · JPL
128613	2004 QB_{22}	—	August 24, 2004	Socorro	LINEAR	EUP	6.9 km	MPC · JPL
128614 Juliabest	2004 QO_{24}	Juliabest	August 21, 2004	Catalina	CSS	·	2.3 km	MPC · JPL
128615 Jimharris	2004 QR_{24}	Jimharris	August 26, 2004	Catalina	CSS	·	1.2 km	MPC · JPL
128616	2004 QA_{25}	—	August 24, 2004	Siding Spring	SSS	PHO	2.0 km	MPC · JPL
128617	2004 QB_{25}	—	August 24, 2004	Siding Spring	SSS	H	920 m	MPC · JPL
128618	2004 QH_{25}	—	August 19, 2004	Socorro	LINEAR	·	9.4 km	MPC · JPL
128619	2004 QN_{25}	—	August 25, 2004	Anderson Mesa	LONEOS	HNS	3.0 km	MPC · JPL
128620	2004 QC_{26}	—	August 25, 2004	Socorro	LINEAR	·	7.3 km	MPC · JPL
128621	2004 RD	—	September 2, 2004	Wrightwood	J. W. Young	·	2.9 km	MPC · JPL
128622 Rudiš	2004 RU	Rudiš	September 4, 2004	Kleť	KLENOT	·	3.5 km	MPC · JPL
128623	2004 RP_{2}	—	September 5, 2004	Bergisch Gladbach	W. Bickel	CLA	2.5 km	MPC · JPL
128624	2004 RU_{3}	—	September 4, 2004	Palomar	NEAT	·	2.0 km	MPC · JPL
128625	2004 RO_{4}	—	September 4, 2004	Palomar	NEAT	EOS	3.6 km	MPC · JPL
128626	2004 RF_{7}	—	September 5, 2004	Palomar	NEAT	EOS	3.6 km	MPC · JPL
128627 Ottmarsheim	2004 RM_{8}	Ottmarsheim	September 6, 2004	Ottmarsheim	C. Rinner	HYG	5.6 km	MPC · JPL
128628	2004 RX_{8}	—	September 6, 2004	Goodricke-Pigott	Goodricke-Pigott	AEO	3.2 km	MPC · JPL
128629	2004 RS_{10}	—	September 7, 2004	Vicques	M. Ory	·	3.8 km	MPC · JPL
128630	2004 RM_{11}	—	September 6, 2004	Siding Spring	SSS	·	3.2 km	MPC · JPL
128631	2004 RN_{11}	—	September 6, 2004	Siding Spring	SSS	V	930 m	MPC · JPL
128632	2004 RT_{11}	—	September 7, 2004	Socorro	LINEAR	3:2	8.1 km	MPC · JPL
128633 Queyras	2004 RF_{12}	Queyras	September 8, 2004	Saint-Véran	St. Veran	CYB	7.9 km	MPC · JPL
128634	2004 RF_{13}	—	September 4, 2004	Palomar	NEAT	·	1.3 km	MPC · JPL
128635	2004 RE_{19}	—	September 7, 2004	Socorro	LINEAR	V	1.0 km	MPC · JPL
128636	2004 RJ_{22}	—	September 7, 2004	Kitt Peak	Spacewatch	·	2.1 km	MPC · JPL
128637	2004 RK_{22}	—	September 7, 2004	Kitt Peak	Spacewatch	·	3.7 km	MPC · JPL
128638	2004 RT_{22}	—	September 7, 2004	Kitt Peak	Spacewatch	NYS	1.9 km	MPC · JPL
128639	2004 RU_{22}	—	September 7, 2004	Kitt Peak	Spacewatch	MAS	980 m	MPC · JPL
128640	2004 RZ_{22}	—	September 7, 2004	Kitt Peak	Spacewatch	·	2.0 km	MPC · JPL
128641	2004 RE_{25}	—	September 6, 2004	Siding Spring	SSS	NYS ·	2.5 km	MPC · JPL
128642	2004 RK_{27}	—	September 6, 2004	Palomar	NEAT	·	1.7 km	MPC · JPL
128643	2004 RM_{30}	—	September 7, 2004	Socorro	LINEAR	·	1 km	MPC · JPL
128644	2004 RW_{32}	—	September 7, 2004	Socorro	LINEAR	MAS	1.0 km	MPC · JPL
128645	2004 RA_{35}	—	September 7, 2004	Socorro	LINEAR	·	1.7 km	MPC · JPL
128646	2004 RT_{36}	—	September 7, 2004	Socorro	LINEAR	·	2.4 km	MPC · JPL
128647	2004 RC_{39}	—	September 7, 2004	Kitt Peak	Spacewatch	AST	3.4 km	MPC · JPL
128648	2004 RT_{42}	—	September 8, 2004	Socorro	LINEAR	slow	3.5 km	MPC · JPL
128649	2004 RC_{44}	—	September 8, 2004	Socorro	LINEAR	·	2.1 km	MPC · JPL
128650	2004 RN_{44}	—	September 8, 2004	Palomar	NEAT	·	3.6 km	MPC · JPL
128651	2004 RP_{44}	—	September 8, 2004	Socorro	LINEAR	V	1.2 km	MPC · JPL
128652	2004 RJ_{45}	—	September 8, 2004	Socorro	LINEAR	·	1.0 km	MPC · JPL
128653	2004 RT_{45}	—	September 8, 2004	Socorro	LINEAR	·	4.1 km	MPC · JPL
128654	2004 RU_{47}	—	September 8, 2004	Socorro	LINEAR	·	2.4 km	MPC · JPL
128655	2004 RD_{49}	—	September 8, 2004	Socorro	LINEAR	·	1.3 km	MPC · JPL
128656	2004 RG_{49}	—	September 8, 2004	Socorro	LINEAR	·	2.6 km	MPC · JPL
128657	2004 RN_{50}	—	September 8, 2004	Socorro	LINEAR	·	1.5 km	MPC · JPL
128658	2004 RJ_{51}	—	September 8, 2004	Socorro	LINEAR	NYS	2.2 km	MPC · JPL
128659	2004 RC_{52}	—	September 8, 2004	Socorro	LINEAR	·	4.4 km	MPC · JPL
128660	2004 RH_{55}	—	September 8, 2004	Socorro	LINEAR	·	2.2 km	MPC · JPL
128661	2004 RT_{55}	—	September 8, 2004	Socorro	LINEAR	·	1.6 km	MPC · JPL
128662	2004 RW_{55}	—	September 8, 2004	Socorro	LINEAR	·	4.5 km	MPC · JPL
128663	2004 RY_{55}	—	September 8, 2004	Socorro	LINEAR	·	1.3 km	MPC · JPL
128664	2004 RJ_{56}	—	September 8, 2004	Socorro	LINEAR	·	1.8 km	MPC · JPL
128665	2004 RK_{57}	—	September 8, 2004	Socorro	LINEAR	·	2.3 km	MPC · JPL
128666	2004 RE_{59}	—	September 8, 2004	Socorro	LINEAR	·	1.6 km	MPC · JPL
128667	2004 RL_{59}	—	September 8, 2004	Socorro	LINEAR	·	1.0 km	MPC · JPL
128668	2004 RP_{60}	—	September 8, 2004	Socorro	LINEAR	·	1.1 km	MPC · JPL
128669	2004 RA_{61}	—	September 8, 2004	Socorro	LINEAR	·	2.7 km	MPC · JPL
128670	2004 RB_{61}	—	September 8, 2004	Socorro	LINEAR	·	3.1 km	MPC · JPL
128671	2004 RG_{61}	—	September 8, 2004	Socorro	LINEAR	·	1.8 km	MPC · JPL
128672	2004 RK_{61}	—	September 8, 2004	Socorro	LINEAR	·	1.5 km	MPC · JPL
128673	2004 RM_{61}	—	September 8, 2004	Socorro	LINEAR	·	4.1 km	MPC · JPL
128674	2004 RJ_{62}	—	September 8, 2004	Socorro	LINEAR	MAS	1.2 km	MPC · JPL
128675	2004 RU_{62}	—	September 8, 2004	Socorro	LINEAR	·	2.3 km	MPC · JPL
128676	2004 RC_{63}	—	September 8, 2004	Socorro	LINEAR	V	1.2 km	MPC · JPL
128677	2004 RD_{63}	—	September 8, 2004	Socorro	LINEAR	·	6.2 km	MPC · JPL
128678	2004 RW_{64}	—	September 8, 2004	Socorro	LINEAR	NYS	2.0 km	MPC · JPL
128679	2004 RB_{65}	—	September 8, 2004	Socorro	LINEAR	·	2.0 km	MPC · JPL
128680	2004 RF_{69}	—	September 8, 2004	Socorro	LINEAR	·	4.4 km	MPC · JPL
128681	2004 RS_{75}	—	September 8, 2004	Socorro	LINEAR	·	3.9 km	MPC · JPL
128682	2004 RT_{75}	—	September 8, 2004	Socorro	LINEAR	THM	3.7 km	MPC · JPL
128683	2004 RJ_{77}	—	September 8, 2004	Socorro	LINEAR	HYG	5.7 km	MPC · JPL
128684	2004 RN_{77}	—	September 8, 2004	Socorro	LINEAR	PHO	1.8 km	MPC · JPL
128685	2004 RT_{79}	—	September 7, 2004	Socorro	LINEAR	EUP	7.6 km	MPC · JPL
128686	2004 RE_{80}	—	September 7, 2004	Socorro	LINEAR	·	2.0 km	MPC · JPL
128687	2004 RV_{81}	—	September 8, 2004	Palomar	NEAT	·	1.0 km	MPC · JPL
128688	2004 RT_{82}	—	September 9, 2004	Socorro	LINEAR	·	2.2 km	MPC · JPL
128689	2004 RE_{83}	—	September 9, 2004	Socorro	LINEAR	·	2.2 km	MPC · JPL
128690	2004 RZ_{85}	—	September 7, 2004	Socorro	LINEAR	GEF	2.4 km	MPC · JPL
128691	2004 RL_{89}	—	September 8, 2004	Socorro	LINEAR	·	2.2 km	MPC · JPL
128692	2004 RO_{90}	—	September 8, 2004	Socorro	LINEAR	·	960 m	MPC · JPL
128693	2004 RZ_{92}	—	September 8, 2004	Socorro	LINEAR	slow	5.3 km	MPC · JPL
128694	2004 RD_{93}	—	September 8, 2004	Socorro	LINEAR	·	4.2 km	MPC · JPL
128695	2004 RH_{97}	—	September 8, 2004	Palomar	NEAT	·	5.4 km	MPC · JPL
128696	2004 RV_{97}	—	September 8, 2004	Socorro	LINEAR	·	2.5 km	MPC · JPL
128697	2004 RW_{97}	—	September 8, 2004	Socorro	LINEAR	·	1.0 km	MPC · JPL
128698	2004 RD_{99}	—	September 8, 2004	Socorro	LINEAR	·	2.1 km	MPC · JPL
128699	2004 RX_{99}	—	September 8, 2004	Socorro	LINEAR	·	1.4 km	MPC · JPL
128700	2004 RA_{100}	—	September 8, 2004	Socorro	LINEAR	·	2.8 km	MPC · JPL

== 128701–128800 ==
back to top

Designation			Discovery			Properties		Ref
Permanent	Provisional	Named after	Date	Site	Discoverer(s)	Category	Diam.	Ref
128701	2004 RN_{100}	—	September 8, 2004	Socorro	LINEAR	·	2.0 km	MPC · JPL
128702	2004 RN_{101}	—	September 8, 2004	Socorro	LINEAR	·	1.2 km	MPC · JPL
128703	2004 RB_{103}	—	September 8, 2004	Socorro	LINEAR	AGN	2.1 km	MPC · JPL
128704	2004 RA_{104}	—	September 8, 2004	Palomar	NEAT	·	4.0 km	MPC · JPL
128705	2004 RE_{104}	—	September 8, 2004	Palomar	NEAT	·	5.8 km	MPC · JPL
128706	2004 RK_{104}	—	September 8, 2004	Palomar	NEAT	·	2.1 km	MPC · JPL
128707	2004 RQ_{104}	—	September 8, 2004	Palomar	NEAT	·	3.6 km	MPC · JPL
128708	2004 RT_{104}	—	September 8, 2004	Palomar	NEAT	EOS	3.9 km	MPC · JPL
128709	2004 RU_{105}	—	September 8, 2004	Palomar	NEAT	·	4.2 km	MPC · JPL
128710	2004 RF_{106}	—	September 8, 2004	Palomar	NEAT	V	970 m	MPC · JPL
128711	2004 RM_{107}	—	September 9, 2004	Socorro	LINEAR	KOR ·	2.4 km	MPC · JPL
128712	2004 RV_{107}	—	September 9, 2004	Socorro	LINEAR	·	1.3 km	MPC · JPL
128713	2004 RJ_{112}	—	September 6, 2004	Socorro	LINEAR	·	5.5 km	MPC · JPL
128714	2004 RU_{112}	—	September 6, 2004	Socorro	LINEAR	·	5.8 km	MPC · JPL
128715	2004 RA_{115}	—	September 7, 2004	Socorro	LINEAR	·	1.6 km	MPC · JPL
128716	2004 RP_{118}	—	September 7, 2004	Kitt Peak	Spacewatch	·	2.1 km	MPC · JPL
128717	2004 RT_{121}	—	September 7, 2004	Kitt Peak	Spacewatch	·	1.4 km	MPC · JPL
128718	2004 RD_{124}	—	September 7, 2004	Socorro	LINEAR	·	4.1 km	MPC · JPL
128719	2004 RJ_{124}	—	September 7, 2004	Socorro	LINEAR	·	2.9 km	MPC · JPL
128720	2004 RY_{124}	—	September 7, 2004	Kitt Peak	Spacewatch	·	990 m	MPC · JPL
128721	2004 RU_{136}	—	September 8, 2004	Kleť	Kleť	HOF	4.3 km	MPC · JPL
128722	2004 RT_{137}	—	September 8, 2004	Socorro	LINEAR	·	4.1 km	MPC · JPL
128723	2004 RG_{140}	—	September 8, 2004	Socorro	LINEAR	·	5.5 km	MPC · JPL
128724	2004 RK_{140}	—	September 8, 2004	Socorro	LINEAR	·	3.8 km	MPC · JPL
128725	2004 RL_{140}	—	September 8, 2004	Socorro	LINEAR	·	4.6 km	MPC · JPL
128726	2004 RN_{143}	—	September 8, 2004	Socorro	LINEAR	NEM	4.1 km	MPC · JPL
128727	2004 RR_{143}	—	September 8, 2004	Socorro	LINEAR	·	1.7 km	MPC · JPL
128728	2004 RB_{144}	—	September 8, 2004	Socorro	LINEAR	·	3.4 km	MPC · JPL
128729	2004 RC_{144}	—	September 8, 2004	Socorro	LINEAR	·	5.1 km	MPC · JPL
128730	2004 RE_{150}	—	September 9, 2004	Socorro	LINEAR	GEF	2.4 km	MPC · JPL
128731	2004 RX_{151}	—	September 9, 2004	Socorro	LINEAR	·	2.8 km	MPC · JPL
128732	2004 RT_{152}	—	September 10, 2004	Socorro	LINEAR	·	2.6 km	MPC · JPL
128733	2004 RV_{152}	—	September 10, 2004	Socorro	LINEAR	·	5.7 km	MPC · JPL
128734	2004 RP_{153}	—	September 10, 2004	Socorro	LINEAR	EOS	3.6 km	MPC · JPL
128735	2004 RT_{153}	—	September 10, 2004	Socorro	LINEAR	·	3.8 km	MPC · JPL
128736	2004 RJ_{156}	—	September 10, 2004	Socorro	LINEAR	·	1.8 km	MPC · JPL
128737	2004 RS_{156}	—	September 10, 2004	Socorro	LINEAR	·	4.3 km	MPC · JPL
128738	2004 RB_{157}	—	September 10, 2004	Socorro	LINEAR	·	2.3 km	MPC · JPL
128739	2004 RD_{159}	—	September 10, 2004	Socorro	LINEAR	·	1.0 km	MPC · JPL
128740	2004 RW_{159}	—	September 10, 2004	Socorro	LINEAR	·	1.4 km	MPC · JPL
128741	2004 RE_{161}	—	September 10, 2004	Socorro	LINEAR	·	5.0 km	MPC · JPL
128742	2004 RB_{162}	—	September 11, 2004	Socorro	LINEAR	·	5.9 km	MPC · JPL
128743	2004 RM_{163}	—	September 11, 2004	Socorro	LINEAR	EUP	6.3 km	MPC · JPL
128744	2004 RG_{169}	—	September 8, 2004	Palomar	NEAT	V	1.1 km	MPC · JPL
128745	2004 RO_{170}	—	September 8, 2004	Palomar	NEAT	EOS	3.8 km	MPC · JPL
128746	2004 RJ_{176}	—	September 10, 2004	Socorro	LINEAR	·	1.4 km	MPC · JPL
128747	2004 RL_{176}	—	September 10, 2004	Socorro	LINEAR	·	2.1 km	MPC · JPL
128748	2004 RS_{180}	—	September 10, 2004	Socorro	LINEAR	V	1.1 km	MPC · JPL
128749	2004 RG_{181}	—	September 10, 2004	Socorro	LINEAR	·	2.1 km	MPC · JPL
128750	2004 RX_{181}	—	September 10, 2004	Socorro	LINEAR	·	4.9 km	MPC · JPL
128751	2004 RL_{182}	—	September 10, 2004	Socorro	LINEAR	MRX	1.7 km	MPC · JPL
128752	2004 RA_{183}	—	September 10, 2004	Socorro	LINEAR	·	1.7 km	MPC · JPL
128753	2004 RE_{183}	—	September 10, 2004	Socorro	LINEAR	·	4.2 km	MPC · JPL
128754	2004 RQ_{185}	—	September 10, 2004	Socorro	LINEAR	VER	5.0 km	MPC · JPL
128755	2004 RD_{187}	—	September 10, 2004	Socorro	LINEAR	EUN	2.8 km	MPC · JPL
128756	2004 RE_{188}	—	September 10, 2004	Socorro	LINEAR	·	1.3 km	MPC · JPL
128757	2004 RJ_{189}	—	September 10, 2004	Socorro	LINEAR	V	1.2 km	MPC · JPL
128758	2004 RR_{190}	—	September 10, 2004	Socorro	LINEAR	·	6.7 km	MPC · JPL
128759	2004 RT_{190}	—	September 10, 2004	Socorro	LINEAR	·	5.8 km	MPC · JPL
128760	2004 RU_{190}	—	September 10, 2004	Socorro	LINEAR	·	7.0 km	MPC · JPL
128761	2004 RW_{190}	—	September 10, 2004	Socorro	LINEAR	NYS	1.7 km	MPC · JPL
128762	2004 RZ_{190}	—	September 10, 2004	Socorro	LINEAR	·	4.7 km	MPC · JPL
128763	2004 RF_{191}	—	September 10, 2004	Socorro	LINEAR	·	3.6 km	MPC · JPL
128764	2004 RJ_{191}	—	September 10, 2004	Socorro	LINEAR	·	1.3 km	MPC · JPL
128765	2004 RQ_{191}	—	September 10, 2004	Socorro	LINEAR	·	3.5 km	MPC · JPL
128766	2004 RF_{192}	—	September 10, 2004	Socorro	LINEAR	V	1.1 km	MPC · JPL
128767	2004 RL_{192}	—	September 10, 2004	Socorro	LINEAR	·	5.3 km	MPC · JPL
128768	2004 RP_{192}	—	September 10, 2004	Socorro	LINEAR	·	4.3 km	MPC · JPL
128769	2004 RJ_{193}	—	September 10, 2004	Socorro	LINEAR	EOS	4.4 km	MPC · JPL
128770	2004 RY_{193}	—	September 10, 2004	Socorro	LINEAR	MRX	1.6 km	MPC · JPL
128771	2004 RB_{194}	—	September 10, 2004	Socorro	LINEAR	V	1.4 km	MPC · JPL
128772	2004 RX_{194}	—	September 10, 2004	Socorro	LINEAR	·	1.6 km	MPC · JPL
128773	2004 RA_{195}	—	September 10, 2004	Socorro	LINEAR	·	2.9 km	MPC · JPL
128774	2004 RH_{195}	—	September 10, 2004	Socorro	LINEAR	PHO	2.0 km	MPC · JPL
128775	2004 RL_{196}	—	September 10, 2004	Socorro	LINEAR	·	7.3 km	MPC · JPL
128776	2004 RZ_{196}	—	September 10, 2004	Socorro	LINEAR	·	3.3 km	MPC · JPL
128777	2004 RX_{197}	—	September 10, 2004	Socorro	LINEAR	·	3.7 km	MPC · JPL
128778	2004 RP_{200}	—	September 10, 2004	Socorro	LINEAR	·	5.9 km	MPC · JPL
128779	2004 RQ_{200}	—	September 10, 2004	Socorro	LINEAR	EUN	3.1 km	MPC · JPL
128780	2004 RE_{201}	—	September 10, 2004	Socorro	LINEAR	·	6.4 km	MPC · JPL
128781	2004 RN_{203}	—	September 11, 2004	Kitt Peak	Spacewatch	·	2.9 km	MPC · JPL
128782	2004 RP_{206}	—	September 11, 2004	Socorro	LINEAR	·	6.2 km	MPC · JPL
128783	2004 RH_{207}	—	September 11, 2004	Socorro	LINEAR	·	3.7 km	MPC · JPL
128784	2004 RN_{212}	—	September 11, 2004	Socorro	LINEAR	·	4.9 km	MPC · JPL
128785	2004 RE_{213}	—	September 11, 2004	Socorro	LINEAR	·	5.3 km	MPC · JPL
128786	2004 RN_{213}	—	September 11, 2004	Socorro	LINEAR	·	2.9 km	MPC · JPL
128787	2004 RS_{213}	—	September 11, 2004	Socorro	LINEAR	EUN	2.5 km	MPC · JPL
128788	2004 RS_{214}	—	September 11, 2004	Socorro	LINEAR	·	5.8 km	MPC · JPL
128789	2004 RE_{216}	—	September 11, 2004	Socorro	LINEAR	PHO	2.1 km	MPC · JPL
128790	2004 RP_{216}	—	September 11, 2004	Socorro	LINEAR	·	4.1 km	MPC · JPL
128791	2004 RG_{218}	—	September 11, 2004	Socorro	LINEAR	slow	4.9 km	MPC · JPL
128792	2004 RM_{218}	—	September 11, 2004	Socorro	LINEAR	·	3.7 km	MPC · JPL
128793	2004 RS_{219}	—	September 11, 2004	Socorro	LINEAR	·	3.6 km	MPC · JPL
128794	2004 RE_{221}	—	September 11, 2004	Socorro	LINEAR	·	6.5 km	MPC · JPL
128795 Douglaswalker	2004 RG_{222}	Douglaswalker	September 13, 2004	Goodricke-Pigott	R. A. Tucker	AGN	2.0 km	MPC · JPL
128796	2004 RY_{222}	—	September 7, 2004	Socorro	LINEAR	·	2.0 km	MPC · JPL
128797	2004 RH_{223}	—	September 7, 2004	Kitt Peak	Spacewatch	·	2.1 km	MPC · JPL
128798	2004 RJ_{223}	—	September 7, 2004	Kitt Peak	Spacewatch	·	1.9 km	MPC · JPL
128799	2004 RS_{225}	—	September 9, 2004	Socorro	LINEAR	MAS	1.4 km	MPC · JPL
128800	2004 RH_{231}	—	September 9, 2004	Kitt Peak	Spacewatch	·	2.6 km	MPC · JPL

== 128801–128900 ==
back to top

Designation			Discovery			Properties		Ref
Permanent	Provisional	Named after	Date	Site	Discoverer(s)	Category	Diam.	Ref
128801	2004 RZ_{233}	—	September 9, 2004	Kitt Peak	Spacewatch	·	1.1 km	MPC · JPL
128802	2004 RE_{234}	—	September 9, 2004	Kitt Peak	Spacewatch	·	3.6 km	MPC · JPL
128803	2004 RF_{235}	—	September 10, 2004	Socorro	LINEAR	·	2.1 km	MPC · JPL
128804	2004 RM_{247}	—	September 12, 2004	Socorro	LINEAR	PHO	2.2 km	MPC · JPL
128805	2004 RK_{250}	—	September 13, 2004	Socorro	LINEAR	NYS	1.3 km	MPC · JPL
128806	2004 RS_{250}	—	September 13, 2004	Palomar	NEAT	·	3.6 km	MPC · JPL
128807	2004 RC_{255}	—	September 6, 2004	Palomar	NEAT	EUN	2.1 km	MPC · JPL
128808	2004 RK_{255}	—	September 6, 2004	Palomar	NEAT	EUN	2.3 km	MPC · JPL
128809	2004 RP_{255}	—	September 6, 2004	Palomar	NEAT	·	5.4 km	MPC · JPL
128810	2004 RR_{255}	—	September 6, 2004	Palomar	NEAT	MAR	2.5 km	MPC · JPL
128811	2004 RV_{255}	—	September 6, 2004	Palomar	NEAT	·	6.4 km	MPC · JPL
128812	2004 RW_{255}	—	September 6, 2004	Palomar	NEAT	·	2.1 km	MPC · JPL
128813	2004 RH_{288}	—	September 15, 2004	7300 Observatory	W. K. Y. Yeung	MAS	1.2 km	MPC · JPL
128814	2004 RJ_{288}	—	September 15, 2004	7300 Observatory	W. K. Y. Yeung	·	3.2 km	MPC · JPL
128815	2004 RK_{288}	—	September 15, 2004	7300 Observatory	W. K. Y. Yeung	THM	3.0 km	MPC · JPL
128816	2004 RX_{290}	—	September 9, 2004	Kitt Peak	Spacewatch	·	3.6 km	MPC · JPL
128817	2004 RE_{291}	—	September 10, 2004	Socorro	LINEAR	RAF	1.8 km	MPC · JPL
128818	2004 RH_{294}	—	September 11, 2004	Palomar	NEAT	EOS	3.6 km	MPC · JPL
128819	2004 RX_{295}	—	September 11, 2004	Kitt Peak	Spacewatch	·	1.7 km	MPC · JPL
128820	2004 RO_{303}	—	September 12, 2004	Kitt Peak	Spacewatch	·	2.1 km	MPC · JPL
128821	2004 RC_{306}	—	September 12, 2004	Socorro	LINEAR	·	6.9 km	MPC · JPL
128822	2004 RK_{306}	—	September 12, 2004	Socorro	LINEAR	·	1.5 km	MPC · JPL
128823	2004 RS_{307}	—	September 13, 2004	Socorro	LINEAR	·	2.2 km	MPC · JPL
128824	2004 RA_{308}	—	September 13, 2004	Socorro	LINEAR	·	6.2 km	MPC · JPL
128825	2004 RS_{308}	—	September 13, 2004	Socorro	LINEAR	·	1.7 km	MPC · JPL
128826	2004 RP_{310}	—	September 13, 2004	Palomar	NEAT	·	1.6 km	MPC · JPL
128827	2004 RT_{310}	—	September 13, 2004	Palomar	NEAT	·	1.9 km	MPC · JPL
128828	2004 RW_{310}	—	September 13, 2004	Palomar	NEAT	NYS	1.9 km	MPC · JPL
128829	2004 RQ_{313}	—	September 15, 2004	Kitt Peak	Spacewatch	KOR	2.1 km	MPC · JPL
128830	2004 RZ_{313}	—	September 15, 2004	Kitt Peak	Spacewatch	·	1.9 km	MPC · JPL
128831	2004 RC_{315}	—	September 15, 2004	Kitt Peak	Spacewatch	·	1.9 km	MPC · JPL
128832	2004 RQ_{321}	—	September 13, 2004	Socorro	LINEAR	·	2.5 km	MPC · JPL
128833	2004 RU_{322}	—	September 13, 2004	Socorro	LINEAR	·	5.5 km	MPC · JPL
128834	2004 RT_{323}	—	September 13, 2004	Socorro	LINEAR	·	3.3 km	MPC · JPL
128835	2004 RC_{324}	—	September 13, 2004	Socorro	LINEAR	EOS ·	3.7 km	MPC · JPL
128836	2004 RG_{324}	—	September 13, 2004	Socorro	LINEAR	·	5.8 km	MPC · JPL
128837	2004 RP_{332}	—	September 14, 2004	Palomar	NEAT	·	3.6 km	MPC · JPL
128838	2004 RS_{332}	—	September 14, 2004	Palomar	NEAT	·	3.3 km	MPC · JPL
128839	2004 RV_{332}	—	September 14, 2004	Palomar	NEAT	·	3.5 km	MPC · JPL
128840	2004 RH_{333}	—	September 15, 2004	Anderson Mesa	LONEOS	·	3.4 km	MPC · JPL
128841	2004 RA_{334}	—	September 15, 2004	Anderson Mesa	LONEOS	JUN	1.5 km	MPC · JPL
128842	2004 RU_{338}	—	September 7, 2004	Socorro	LINEAR	HNS	2.1 km	MPC · JPL
128843	2004 RH_{341}	—	September 11, 2004	Socorro	LINEAR	URS	7.6 km	MPC · JPL
128844	2004 SW_{4}	—	September 17, 2004	Kitt Peak	Spacewatch	·	3.1 km	MPC · JPL
128845	2004 SV_{8}	—	September 17, 2004	Socorro	LINEAR	·	2.8 km	MPC · JPL
128846	2004 ST_{10}	—	September 16, 2004	Siding Spring	SSS	VER	6.5 km	MPC · JPL
128847	2004 SM_{11}	—	September 16, 2004	Siding Spring	SSS	ADE	4.5 km	MPC · JPL
128848	2004 SY_{11}	—	September 16, 2004	Siding Spring	SSS	·	2.2 km	MPC · JPL
128849	2004 SM_{14}	—	September 17, 2004	Anderson Mesa	LONEOS	·	2.7 km	MPC · JPL
128850	2004 SO_{14}	—	September 17, 2004	Anderson Mesa	LONEOS	·	3.1 km	MPC · JPL
128851	2004 SB_{15}	—	September 17, 2004	Anderson Mesa	LONEOS	·	3.7 km	MPC · JPL
128852	2004 SF_{16}	—	September 17, 2004	Anderson Mesa	LONEOS	·	3.1 km	MPC · JPL
128853	2004 SH_{16}	—	September 17, 2004	Anderson Mesa	LONEOS	V	1.2 km	MPC · JPL
128854	2004 SL_{16}	—	September 17, 2004	Anderson Mesa	LONEOS	·	4.4 km	MPC · JPL
128855	2004 SU_{17}	—	September 17, 2004	Anderson Mesa	LONEOS	·	2.8 km	MPC · JPL
128856	2004 SD_{18}	—	September 17, 2004	Anderson Mesa	LONEOS	·	4.5 km	MPC · JPL
128857	2004 SV_{19}	—	September 18, 2004	Socorro	LINEAR	·	1.7 km	MPC · JPL
128858	2004 SQ_{20}	—	September 17, 2004	Desert Eagle	W. K. Y. Yeung	3:2 · SHU	8.1 km	MPC · JPL
128859	2004 ST_{21}	—	September 16, 2004	Kitt Peak	Spacewatch	·	1.3 km	MPC · JPL
128860	2004 SL_{26}	—	September 21, 2004	Socorro	LINEAR	·	6.5 km	MPC · JPL
128861	2004 SK_{30}	—	September 17, 2004	Socorro	LINEAR	·	1.5 km	MPC · JPL
128862	2004 SY_{30}	—	September 17, 2004	Socorro	LINEAR	THM	3.4 km	MPC · JPL
128863	2004 SD_{31}	—	September 17, 2004	Socorro	LINEAR	AGN	2.6 km	MPC · JPL
128864	2004 SJ_{31}	—	September 17, 2004	Socorro	LINEAR	KOR	2.3 km	MPC · JPL
128865	2004 SK_{31}	—	September 17, 2004	Socorro	LINEAR	·	2.9 km	MPC · JPL
128866	2004 SF_{32}	—	September 17, 2004	Socorro	LINEAR	·	1.6 km	MPC · JPL
128867	2004 SV_{32}	—	September 17, 2004	Socorro	LINEAR	KOR	2.5 km	MPC · JPL
128868	2004 SQ_{33}	—	September 17, 2004	Socorro	LINEAR	·	2.1 km	MPC · JPL
128869	2004 SU_{33}	—	September 17, 2004	Socorro	LINEAR	·	5.2 km	MPC · JPL
128870	2004 SW_{33}	—	September 17, 2004	Socorro	LINEAR	·	2.3 km	MPC · JPL
128871	2004 SG_{36}	—	September 17, 2004	Socorro	LINEAR	·	5.0 km	MPC · JPL
128872	2004 SK_{38}	—	September 17, 2004	Socorro	LINEAR	·	3.6 km	MPC · JPL
128873	2004 SH_{39}	—	September 17, 2004	Socorro	LINEAR	·	1.6 km	MPC · JPL
128874	2004 SB_{41}	—	September 17, 2004	Anderson Mesa	LONEOS	·	2.0 km	MPC · JPL
128875	2004 SQ_{44}	—	September 18, 2004	Socorro	LINEAR	·	2.4 km	MPC · JPL
128876	2004 SE_{52}	—	September 18, 2004	Socorro	LINEAR	·	3.6 km	MPC · JPL
128877	2004 SG_{53}	—	September 22, 2004	Socorro	LINEAR	·	8.4 km	MPC · JPL
128878	2004 SR_{54}	—	September 22, 2004	Socorro	LINEAR	·	5.5 km	MPC · JPL
128879	2004 SX_{54}	—	September 22, 2004	Socorro	LINEAR	·	3.7 km	MPC · JPL
128880	2004 SE_{55}	—	September 22, 2004	Kitt Peak	Spacewatch	·	5.0 km	MPC · JPL
128881	2004 SN_{55}	—	September 23, 2004	Socorro	LINEAR	·	1.4 km	MPC · JPL
128882 Jennydebenedetti	2004 SX_{55}	Jennydebenedetti	September 22, 2004	Goodricke-Pigott	R. A. Tucker	·	2.4 km	MPC · JPL
128883	2004 ST_{56}	—	September 16, 2004	Anderson Mesa	LONEOS	·	1.3 km	MPC · JPL
128884	2004 SV_{57}	—	September 16, 2004	Anderson Mesa	LONEOS	·	4.9 km	MPC · JPL
128885	2004 SY_{57}	—	September 16, 2004	Anderson Mesa	LONEOS	MRX	1.8 km	MPC · JPL
128886	2004 SF_{58}	—	September 16, 2004	Anderson Mesa	LONEOS	·	2.5 km	MPC · JPL
128887	2004 SL_{58}	—	September 16, 2004	Anderson Mesa	LONEOS	·	3.6 km	MPC · JPL
128888	2004 SY_{58}	—	September 17, 2004	Socorro	LINEAR	·	2.8 km	MPC · JPL
128889	2004 SF_{59}	—	September 30, 2004	Palomar	NEAT	·	2.4 km	MPC · JPL
128890	2004 SH_{59}	—	September 18, 2004	Socorro	LINEAR	·	2.8 km	MPC · JPL
128891	2004 SP_{59}	—	September 24, 2004	Socorro	LINEAR	·	2.7 km	MPC · JPL
128892	2004 TH	—	October 4, 2004	Kitt Peak	Spacewatch	MAS	1.1 km	MPC · JPL
128893	2004 TK	—	October 3, 2004	Goodricke-Pigott	R. A. Tucker	NYS	2.3 km	MPC · JPL
128894	2004 TL	—	October 3, 2004	Goodricke-Pigott	R. A. Tucker	(16286)	4.0 km	MPC · JPL
128895 Bright Spring	2004 TW	Bright Spring	October 4, 2004	Jarnac	Jarnac	·	1.9 km	MPC · JPL
128896	2004 TA_{2}	—	October 4, 2004	Kitt Peak	Spacewatch	·	2.5 km	MPC · JPL
128897	2004 TD_{3}	—	October 4, 2004	Kitt Peak	Spacewatch	NYS	2.1 km	MPC · JPL
128898	2004 TY_{6}	—	October 3, 2004	Palomar	NEAT	LUT	9.5 km	MPC · JPL
128899	2004 TH_{7}	—	October 5, 2004	Socorro	LINEAR	·	2.7 km	MPC · JPL
128900	2004 TE_{15}	—	October 7, 2004	Anderson Mesa	LONEOS	EUN	3.1 km	MPC · JPL

== 128901–129000 ==
back to top

Designation			Discovery			Properties		Ref
Permanent	Provisional	Named after	Date	Site	Discoverer(s)	Category	Diam.	Ref
128901	2004 TH_{15}	—	October 8, 2004	Kitt Peak	Spacewatch	·	1.2 km	MPC · JPL
128902	2004 TU_{15}	—	October 11, 2004	Kitt Peak	Spacewatch	·	6.3 km	MPC · JPL
128903	2004 TV_{20}	—	October 10, 2004	Bergisch Gladbach	W. Bickel	·	4.0 km	MPC · JPL
128904	2004 TG_{21}	—	October 3, 2004	Palomar	NEAT	·	3.5 km	MPC · JPL
128905	2004 TM_{21}	—	October 3, 2004	Palomar	NEAT	EUN	1.8 km	MPC · JPL
128906	2004 TR_{34}	—	October 4, 2004	Anderson Mesa	LONEOS	slow	4.6 km	MPC · JPL
128907	2004 TT_{41}	—	October 4, 2004	Anderson Mesa	LONEOS	·	1.5 km	MPC · JPL
128908	2004 TU_{43}	—	October 4, 2004	Kitt Peak	Spacewatch	·	3.4 km	MPC · JPL
128909	2004 TX_{44}	—	October 4, 2004	Kitt Peak	Spacewatch	·	2.1 km	MPC · JPL
128910	2004 TV_{48}	—	October 4, 2004	Kitt Peak	Spacewatch	·	7.3 km	MPC · JPL
128911	2004 TX_{51}	—	October 4, 2004	Kitt Peak	Spacewatch	·	2.7 km	MPC · JPL
128912	2004 TF_{53}	—	October 4, 2004	Kitt Peak	Spacewatch	(12739)	2.6 km	MPC · JPL
128913	2004 TU_{53}	—	October 4, 2004	Kitt Peak	Spacewatch	·	2.0 km	MPC · JPL
128914	2004 TV_{53}	—	October 4, 2004	Kitt Peak	Spacewatch	·	4.1 km	MPC · JPL
128915	2004 TG_{56}	—	October 5, 2004	Anderson Mesa	LONEOS	·	1.5 km	MPC · JPL
128916	2004 TV_{57}	—	October 5, 2004	Kitt Peak	Spacewatch	NYS	1.5 km	MPC · JPL
128917	2004 TY_{58}	—	October 5, 2004	Kitt Peak	Spacewatch	·	2.9 km	MPC · JPL
128918	2004 TG_{60}	—	October 5, 2004	Anderson Mesa	LONEOS	THM	3.9 km	MPC · JPL
128919	2004 TU_{60}	—	October 5, 2004	Anderson Mesa	LONEOS	KOR	2.5 km	MPC · JPL
128920	2004 TV_{65}	—	October 5, 2004	Anderson Mesa	LONEOS	·	3.2 km	MPC · JPL
128921	2004 TT_{66}	—	October 5, 2004	Anderson Mesa	LONEOS	·	2.5 km	MPC · JPL
128922	2004 TM_{67}	—	October 5, 2004	Anderson Mesa	LONEOS	EOS	3.8 km	MPC · JPL
128923	2004 TD_{68}	—	October 5, 2004	Anderson Mesa	LONEOS	·	1.7 km	MPC · JPL
128924	2004 TR_{68}	—	October 5, 2004	Anderson Mesa	LONEOS	·	3.7 km	MPC · JPL
128925 Conwell	2004 TJ_{70}	Conwell	October 6, 2004	Antares	R. Holmes	·	4.1 km	MPC · JPL
128926	2004 TM_{70}	—	October 6, 2004	Palomar	NEAT	EOS	3.5 km	MPC · JPL
128927	2004 TZ_{74}	—	October 6, 2004	Kitt Peak	Spacewatch	·	2.4 km	MPC · JPL
128928	2004 TB_{76}	—	October 7, 2004	Anderson Mesa	LONEOS	·	5.4 km	MPC · JPL
128929	2004 TL_{77}	—	October 7, 2004	Anderson Mesa	LONEOS	KOR	3.2 km	MPC · JPL
128930	2004 TA_{79}	—	October 4, 2004	Anderson Mesa	LONEOS	·	2.1 km	MPC · JPL
128931	2004 TB_{84}	—	October 5, 2004	Kitt Peak	Spacewatch	KOR	2.1 km	MPC · JPL
128932	2004 TW_{94}	—	October 5, 2004	Kitt Peak	Spacewatch	KOR	1.8 km	MPC · JPL
128933	2004 TG_{95}	—	October 5, 2004	Kitt Peak	Spacewatch	·	2.0 km	MPC · JPL
128934	2004 TD_{101}	—	October 6, 2004	Kitt Peak	Spacewatch	THM	3.7 km	MPC · JPL
128935	2004 TF_{107}	—	October 7, 2004	Socorro	LINEAR	·	5.2 km	MPC · JPL
128936	2004 TD_{108}	—	October 7, 2004	Socorro	LINEAR	GEF	2.6 km	MPC · JPL
128937	2004 TH_{109}	—	October 7, 2004	Anderson Mesa	LONEOS	·	5.5 km	MPC · JPL
128938	2004 TK_{109}	—	October 7, 2004	Anderson Mesa	LONEOS	THM	4.6 km	MPC · JPL
128939	2004 TU_{110}	—	October 7, 2004	Socorro	LINEAR	·	3.5 km	MPC · JPL
128940	2004 TD_{114}	—	October 7, 2004	Palomar	NEAT	·	6.1 km	MPC · JPL
128941	2004 TS_{118}	—	October 5, 2004	Palomar	NEAT	·	3.1 km	MPC · JPL
128942	2004 TC_{126}	—	October 7, 2004	Socorro	LINEAR	·	4.4 km	MPC · JPL
128943	2004 TT_{127}	—	October 7, 2004	Socorro	LINEAR	NEM	4.2 km	MPC · JPL
128944	2004 TW_{128}	—	October 7, 2004	Socorro	LINEAR	KOR	2.5 km	MPC · JPL
128945	2004 TB_{129}	—	October 7, 2004	Socorro	LINEAR	·	5.1 km	MPC · JPL
128946	2004 TG_{131}	—	October 7, 2004	Socorro	LINEAR	·	3.6 km	MPC · JPL
128947	2004 TK_{131}	—	October 7, 2004	Anderson Mesa	LONEOS	·	6.7 km	MPC · JPL
128948	2004 TO_{131}	—	October 7, 2004	Anderson Mesa	LONEOS	·	4.5 km	MPC · JPL
128949	2004 TV_{131}	—	October 7, 2004	Anderson Mesa	LONEOS	HYG	4.6 km	MPC · JPL
128950	2004 TA_{132}	—	October 7, 2004	Anderson Mesa	LONEOS	EUN	2.4 km	MPC · JPL
128951	2004 TY_{132}	—	October 7, 2004	Palomar	NEAT	EOS	3.5 km	MPC · JPL
128952	2004 TK_{133}	—	October 7, 2004	Anderson Mesa	LONEOS	·	5.3 km	MPC · JPL
128953	2004 TM_{133}	—	October 7, 2004	Anderson Mesa	LONEOS	·	1.2 km	MPC · JPL
128954	2004 TD_{134}	—	October 7, 2004	Palomar	NEAT	EOS	4.0 km	MPC · JPL
128955	2004 TE_{134}	—	October 7, 2004	Palomar	NEAT	(1338) (FLO)	1.4 km	MPC · JPL
128956	2004 TH_{134}	—	October 7, 2004	Palomar	NEAT	·	4.9 km	MPC · JPL
128957	2004 TF_{135}	—	October 8, 2004	Anderson Mesa	LONEOS	NYS	1.9 km	MPC · JPL
128958	2004 TL_{137}	—	October 8, 2004	Anderson Mesa	LONEOS	·	2.0 km	MPC · JPL
128959	2004 TP_{137}	—	October 8, 2004	Anderson Mesa	LONEOS	·	2.8 km	MPC · JPL
128960	2004 TF_{143}	—	October 4, 2004	Kitt Peak	Spacewatch	·	1.5 km	MPC · JPL
128961	2004 TY_{144}	—	October 4, 2004	Kitt Peak	Spacewatch	·	5.5 km	MPC · JPL
128962	2004 TZ_{145}	—	October 5, 2004	Kitt Peak	Spacewatch	·	2.7 km	MPC · JPL
128963	2004 TA_{146}	—	October 5, 2004	Kitt Peak	Spacewatch	·	3.6 km	MPC · JPL
128964	2004 TJ_{146}	—	October 5, 2004	Kitt Peak	Spacewatch	V	1.3 km	MPC · JPL
128965	2004 TU_{146}	—	October 6, 2004	Kitt Peak	Spacewatch	·	1.5 km	MPC · JPL
128966	2004 TQ_{147}	—	October 6, 2004	Kitt Peak	Spacewatch	·	2.8 km	MPC · JPL
128967	2004 TT_{152}	—	October 6, 2004	Kitt Peak	Spacewatch	NYS	1.8 km	MPC · JPL
128968	2004 TW_{159}	—	October 6, 2004	Kitt Peak	Spacewatch	·	7.0 km	MPC · JPL
128969	2004 TU_{162}	—	October 6, 2004	Kitt Peak	Spacewatch	·	2.4 km	MPC · JPL
128970	2004 TY_{162}	—	October 6, 2004	Kitt Peak	Spacewatch	KOR	1.7 km	MPC · JPL
128971	2004 TW_{163}	—	October 6, 2004	Kitt Peak	Spacewatch	·	2.4 km	MPC · JPL
128972	2004 TQ_{165}	—	October 7, 2004	Kitt Peak	Spacewatch	·	2.2 km	MPC · JPL
128973	2004 TB_{167}	—	October 7, 2004	Kitt Peak	Spacewatch	·	2.3 km	MPC · JPL
128974	2004 TK_{169}	—	October 7, 2004	Socorro	LINEAR	·	5.2 km	MPC · JPL
128975	2004 TX_{172}	—	October 8, 2004	Socorro	LINEAR	·	4.9 km	MPC · JPL
128976	2004 TF_{173}	—	October 8, 2004	Socorro	LINEAR	·	2.8 km	MPC · JPL
128977	2004 TB_{174}	—	October 9, 2004	Socorro	LINEAR	·	3.2 km	MPC · JPL
128978	2004 TH_{176}	—	October 9, 2004	Socorro	LINEAR	·	1.6 km	MPC · JPL
128979	2004 TU_{178}	—	October 7, 2004	Kitt Peak	Spacewatch	(5)	1.6 km	MPC · JPL
128980	2004 TV_{182}	—	October 7, 2004	Kitt Peak	Spacewatch	·	2.4 km	MPC · JPL
128981	2004 TA_{190}	—	October 7, 2004	Kitt Peak	Spacewatch	·	3.4 km	MPC · JPL
128982	2004 TR_{194}	—	October 7, 2004	Kitt Peak	Spacewatch	·	5.0 km	MPC · JPL
128983	2004 TQ_{198}	—	October 7, 2004	Kitt Peak	Spacewatch	·	2.6 km	MPC · JPL
128984	2004 TP_{204}	—	October 7, 2004	Kitt Peak	Spacewatch	·	3.9 km	MPC · JPL
128985	2004 TM_{206}	—	October 7, 2004	Kitt Peak	Spacewatch	·	3.8 km	MPC · JPL
128986	2004 TN_{207}	—	October 7, 2004	Kitt Peak	Spacewatch	·	4.5 km	MPC · JPL
128987	2004 TZ_{207}	—	October 7, 2004	Kitt Peak	Spacewatch	THM	4.4 km	MPC · JPL
128988	2004 TR_{211}	—	October 8, 2004	Kitt Peak	Spacewatch	·	2.6 km	MPC · JPL
128989	2004 TN_{212}	—	October 8, 2004	Kitt Peak	Spacewatch	·	3.8 km	MPC · JPL
128990	2004 TW_{212}	—	October 8, 2004	Kitt Peak	Spacewatch	·	3.7 km	MPC · JPL
128991	2004 TZ_{212}	—	October 8, 2004	Kitt Peak	Spacewatch	·	3.3 km	MPC · JPL
128992	2004 TH_{216}	—	October 14, 2004	Kitt Peak	Spacewatch	·	4.5 km	MPC · JPL
128993	2004 TN_{222}	—	October 7, 2004	Socorro	LINEAR	·	6.4 km	MPC · JPL
128994	2004 TE_{228}	—	October 8, 2004	Kitt Peak	Spacewatch	·	1.9 km	MPC · JPL
128995	2004 TZ_{232}	—	October 8, 2004	Kitt Peak	Spacewatch	·	2.4 km	MPC · JPL
128996	2004 TN_{236}	—	October 8, 2004	Socorro	LINEAR	·	5.2 km	MPC · JPL
128997	2004 TQ_{242}	—	October 6, 2004	Socorro	LINEAR	·	3.2 km	MPC · JPL
128998	2004 TU_{242}	—	October 6, 2004	Socorro	LINEAR	·	5.1 km	MPC · JPL
128999	2004 TB_{247}	—	October 7, 2004	Socorro	LINEAR	·	5.4 km	MPC · JPL
129000	2004 TO_{247}	—	October 7, 2004	Socorro	LINEAR	·	2.3 km	MPC · JPL

back to top

== See also ==
- Meanings of minor-planet names: 128001–129000
