= Bergisch Gladbach Observatory =

Astronomical observatory in Germany

- Observatory code: 621
- Location: Bergisch Gladbach, Germany
- Coordinates: 51°05′15″N 7°29′09″E
- Altitude: 368 m (1,207 ft)
- Established: 1995
- Location of Bergisch Gladbach Observatory

The Bergisch Gladbach Observatory is a private astronomical observatory located in Bergisch Gladbach, Germany, at 51°05′15.4″N 7°29′08.8″E. Its observatory code is 621. Its astronomer is Wolf Bickel.

== See also ==
- List of astronomical observatories
