= KinetX =

American aerospace company

KinetX, Inc.
- Type: Private
- Industry: Aerospace
- Founded: 1992; 34 years ago
- Headquarters: Tempe, Arizona,
- Services: Interplanetary navigation; Satellite systems engineering
- Owner: Intuitive Machines
- Website: kinetx.com

KinetX, Inc. (also known as KinetX Aerospace) is a privately held Tempe, Arizona based aerospace engineering, technology, software development and business consulting firm specializing in spaceflight systems. KinetX's main area of expertise is in the areas of interplanetary navigation, satellite systems engineering, and ground system software development.

== Overview ==
KinetX is the first and only private company to ever provide navigation services for NASA interplanetary missions. Their Space Navigation and Flight Dynamics (SNAFD) division, based in Simi Valley, California, has provided mission navigation for the MESSENGER mission to Mercury, the New Horizons mission to Pluto and the Kuiper Belt, and the OSIRIS-REx asteroid sample-return mission.

They are also providing mission navigation for the Emirates Mars Mission and NASA's upcoming Lucy mission to the Trojan asteroids.

KinetX also provided navigation software in support of Intuitive Machines' lunar flights in February 2024 and March 2025.

== Company history ==
KinetX, Inc. was founded in 1992 and was approached shortly thereafter by Motorola for assistance in developing and implementing the Iridium satellite constellation ground system.

In early 1993, several members of KinetX began working on the systems engineering for the Iridium command and control system. The firm later provided engineering support and software development for companies such as Lockheed Martin, Boeing, General Dynamics, Aerojet, Spectrum Astro, and TRW.

The Space Navigation and Flight Dynamics (SNAFD) division was founded in 2001 by Dr. Bobby Williams and has since successfully navigated multiple interplanetary NASA missions, making KinetX the first privately held company to do so.

On October 1, 2025, Intuitive Machines announced that it had completed its purchase of the company for $30 million.
