= Meanings of minor-planet names: 127001–128000 =

As minor planet discoveries are confirmed, they are given a permanent number by the IAU's Minor Planet Center (MPC), and the discoverers can then submit names for them, following the IAU's naming conventions. The list below concerns those minor planets in the specified number-range that have received names, and explains the meanings of those names.

Official naming citations of newly named small Solar System bodies are approved and published in a bulletin by IAU's Working Group for Small Bodies Nomenclature (WGSBN). Before May 2021, citations were published in MPC's Minor Planet Circulars for many decades. Recent citations can also be found on the JPL Small-Body Database (SBDB). Until his death in 2016, German astronomer Lutz D. Schmadel compiled these citations into the Dictionary of Minor Planet Names (DMP) and regularly updated the collection.

Based on Paul Herget's The Names of the Minor Planets, Schmadel also researched the unclear origin of numerous asteroids, most of which had been named prior to World War II. This article incorporates text from this source, which is in the public domain: SBDB New namings may only be added to this list below after official publication as the preannouncement of names is condemned. The WGSBN publishes a comprehensive guideline for the naming rules of non-cometary small Solar System bodies.

== 127001–127100 ==
Named minor planet	Provisional	This minor planet was named for...	Ref · Catalog
127005 Pratchett	2002 GY_{1}	Terry Pratchett (1948–2015), English author known for his comic fantasy book series, Discworld	JPL · 127005
127030 Herrington	2002 GZ_{28}	John Herrington (born 1958) is a former NASA astronaut and a member of the Chickasaw Nation. Herrington was a mission specialist for the 16th space shuttle flight to the International Space Station and he performed three space walks during the mission.	JPL · 127030

== 127101–127200 ==
back to top

Named minor planet	Provisional	This minor planet was named for...	Ref · Catalog
127196 Hanaceplechová	2002 HH	Hana Ceplechová (born 1945), long-time secretary in the Interplanetary Matter Department of the Ondrejov Observatory in the Czech Republic	JPL · 127196

== 127201–127300 ==
back to top

Named minor planet	Provisional	This minor planet was named for...	Ref · Catalog
There are no named minor planets in this number range

== 127301–127400 ==
back to top

Named minor planet	Provisional	This minor planet was named for...	Ref · Catalog
There are no named minor planets in this number range

== 127401–127500 ==
back to top

Named minor planet	Provisional	This minor planet was named for...	Ref · Catalog
127415 Annacalderara	2002 NG_{6}	Anna Calderara (b. 1958), an Italian doctor from San Giovanni in Persiceto (Bologna). She participated in the activities of the Persicetan Amateur Astronomers Group which led to the creation of the Astronomical Observatory and then the Planetarium and Museum.	IAU · 127415
127477 Fredalee	2002 RS_{211}	Freda Denham Lee (1914–1991) was a highly regarded teacher; her career spanned the dawn of the Space Age. Though not trained in science, her science-minded students found a tireless mentor who effectively guided independent explorations. She gifted such students fulfilling science and engineering careers.	IAU · 127477

== 127501–127600 ==
back to top

Named minor planet	Provisional	This minor planet was named for...	Ref · Catalog
127515 Nitta	2002 TY_{306}	Atsuko Nitta (born 1966), Japanese-American astronomer with the Sloan Digital Sky Survey	JPL · 127515
127516 Oravetz	2002 TT_{307}	Daniel Oravetz (born 1984), American astronomer with the Sloan Digital Sky Survey	JPL · 127516
127517 Kaikepan	2002 TJ_{371}	Kaike Pan (born 1965), Chinese-American astronomer with the Sloan Digital Sky Survey	JPL · 127517
127545 Crisman	2002 XZ_{91}	James R. Crisman (born 1937), president of the Astronomy Club of Sun City West in Arizona and supporter of the Lowell Observatory	JPL · 127545

== 127601–127700 ==
back to top

Named minor planet	Provisional	This minor planet was named for...	Ref · Catalog
127658 Gapers	2003 DV_{10}	The Gruppo Astrofili Persicetani (GAPers) is an Italian cultural association near Bologna.	IAU · 127658
127660 Mauroianeselli	2002 AB_{67}	Mauro Ianeselli (1958–2021), an Italian amateur astronomer.	IAU · 127660
127664 Denza	2003 DV_{14}	Francesco Maria Denza (1834–1894), Italian priest of the Barnabite order, meteorologist and astronomer, and first director of the Vatican Observatory.	IAU · 127664
127689 Doncapone	2003 EE_{17}	Don Giuseppe Capone (1922–2009), Italian cleric, archeoastronomer, and scholar of the origins of the city of Alatri (Aletrium) and rector of the diocesan Seminar	JPL · 127689

== 127701–127800 ==
back to top

Named minor planet	Provisional	This minor planet was named for...	Ref · Catalog
127737 Ferretti	2003 FZ_{5}	Annalisa Ferretti (born 1964), Italian paleontologist, Assistant Professor of Paleontology and Paleoecology at Unimore.	IAU · 127737

== 127801–127900 ==
back to top

Named minor planet	Provisional	This minor planet was named for...	Ref · Catalog
127803 Johnvaneepoel	2003 FP_{77}	John M. Van Eepoel (born 1977), contributor to the OSIRIS-REx asteroid sample-return mission and to its navigation and flight dynamics team	JPL · 127803
127810 Michaelwright	2003 FK_{85}	Michael Wright (born 1960) is the project lead for assembly, test, and launch operations for the OSIRIS-REx asteroid sample-return mission. He is also an exploration systems engineer, developing concepts for human exploration of Mars. He served as an integration and test manager for over a dozen missions including FREESTAR on the final flight of space shuttle Columbia	JPL · 127810
127870 Vigo	2003 FE_{123}	Vigo, Galicia, Spain, the first discoverer's birthplace	JPL · 127870

== 127901–128000 ==
back to top

Named minor planet	Provisional	This minor planet was named for...	Ref · Catalog
127933 Shaunoborn	2003 HF_{1}	Shaun Oborn (born 1964), member of the "Solo Effects LLC" team and contributor to the OSIRIS-REx asteroid sample-return mission working and its navigation and flight dynamics team	JPL · 127933
127935 Reedmckenna	2003 HM_{1}	Reed McKenna (born 1959), member of the "Solo Effects LLC" team and contributor to the OSIRIS-REx asteroid sample-return mission working and its navigation and flight dynamics team	JPL · 127935
127936 Maia	2003 HU_{1}	Maia Palomba (b. 2011), the second daughter of Ernesto Palomba, one of the CINEOS observers.	IAU · 127936
127955 Alexandraradu	2003 HY_{13}	Alexandra Radu, a Romanian graduate of the National University of Theatre and Film I. L. Caragiale and a director who brings characters to life through the art of dubbing animated worlds.	IAU · 127955
127965 Ettorecittadini	2003 HG_{22}	Ettore Cittadini (born 1932), Italian gynecologist and pioneer of medically-assisted reproductive technology.	IAU · 127965

back to top

Preceded by 126,001–127,000	Meanings of minor-planet names List of minor planets: 127,001–128,000	Succeeded by 128,001–129,000
