= List of minor planets: 127001–128000 =

The following is a partial list of minor planets, running from minor-planet number 127001 through 128000, inclusive. The primary data for this and other partial lists is based on JPL's "Small-Body Orbital Elements" and data available from the Minor Planet Center. Critical list information is also provided by the MPC, unless otherwise specified from Lowell Observatory. A detailed description of the table's columns and additional sources are given on the main page including a complete list of every page in this series, and a statistical break-up on the dynamical classification of minor planets.

Also see the summary list of all named bodies in numerical and alphabetical order, and the corresponding naming citations for the number range of this particular list. New namings may only be added to this list after official publication, as the preannouncement of names is condemned by the Working Group for Small Bodies Nomenclature of the International Astronomical Union.

Near-Earth obj.	MBA (inner)	MBA (outer)	Centaur
Mars-crosser	MBA (middle)	Jupiter trojan	Trans-Neptunian obj.
Unclassified

== 127001–127100 ==
Designation			Discovery			Properties		Ref
Permanent	Provisional	Named after	Date	Site	Discoverer(s)	Category	Diam.	Ref
127001	2002 FT_{36}	—	March 23, 2002	Socorro	LINEAR	·	3.5 km	MPC · JPL
127002	2002 FE_{38}	—	March 30, 2002	Palomar	NEAT	·	1.8 km	MPC · JPL
127003	2002 GO	—	April 3, 2002	Kvistaberg	Uppsala-DLR Asteroid Survey	·	6.3 km	MPC · JPL
127004	2002 GW_{1}	—	April 3, 2002	Kvistaberg	Uppsala-DLR Asteroid Survey	·	3.7 km	MPC · JPL
127005 Pratchett	2002 GY_{1}	Pratchett	April 1, 2002	Needville	J. Dellinger, Dillon, W. G.	·	1.2 km	MPC · JPL
127006	2002 GR_{5}	—	April 9, 2002	Palomar	NEAT	·	2.6 km	MPC · JPL
127007	2002 GC_{7}	—	April 12, 2002	Desert Eagle	W. K. Y. Yeung	EUN	2.2 km	MPC · JPL
127008	2002 GU_{8}	—	April 12, 2002	Palomar	NEAT	JUN	2.7 km	MPC · JPL
127009	2002 GK_{11}	—	April 14, 2002	Desert Eagle	W. K. Y. Yeung	HNS	3.1 km	MPC · JPL
127010	2002 GO_{11}	—	April 14, 2002	Desert Eagle	W. K. Y. Yeung	EUN	2.3 km	MPC · JPL
127011	2002 GT_{11}	—	April 14, 2002	Desert Eagle	W. K. Y. Yeung	·	4.6 km	MPC · JPL
127012	2002 GU_{11}	—	April 15, 2002	Desert Eagle	W. K. Y. Yeung	·	3.9 km	MPC · JPL
127013	2002 GV_{11}	—	April 15, 2002	Desert Eagle	W. K. Y. Yeung	·	3.6 km	MPC · JPL
127014	2002 GY_{11}	—	April 15, 2002	Desert Eagle	W. K. Y. Yeung	·	5.4 km	MPC · JPL
127015	2002 GM_{13}	—	April 14, 2002	Socorro	LINEAR	·	3.4 km	MPC · JPL
127016	2002 GD_{15}	—	April 15, 2002	Socorro	LINEAR	THM	4.7 km	MPC · JPL
127017	2002 GM_{15}	—	April 15, 2002	Socorro	LINEAR	GEF	2.3 km	MPC · JPL
127018	2002 GS_{15}	—	April 15, 2002	Socorro	LINEAR	·	2.9 km	MPC · JPL
127019	2002 GJ_{16}	—	April 15, 2002	Socorro	LINEAR	(159)	5.9 km	MPC · JPL
127020	2002 GK_{16}	—	April 15, 2002	Socorro	LINEAR	EOS	3.2 km	MPC · JPL
127021	2002 GP_{16}	—	April 15, 2002	Socorro	LINEAR	·	6.4 km	MPC · JPL
127022	2002 GQ_{18}	—	April 14, 2002	Palomar	NEAT	JUN	2.0 km	MPC · JPL
127023	2002 GC_{20}	—	April 14, 2002	Socorro	LINEAR	·	1.8 km	MPC · JPL
127024	2002 GE_{20}	—	April 14, 2002	Socorro	LINEAR	·	5.6 km	MPC · JPL
127025	2002 GF_{21}	—	April 14, 2002	Socorro	LINEAR	·	4.2 km	MPC · JPL
127026	2002 GL_{21}	—	April 14, 2002	Socorro	LINEAR	·	3.8 km	MPC · JPL
127027	2002 GT_{22}	—	April 14, 2002	Haleakala	NEAT	·	5.5 km	MPC · JPL
127028	2002 GA_{23}	—	April 15, 2002	Palomar	NEAT	·	3.7 km	MPC · JPL
127029	2002 GB_{26}	—	April 11, 2002	Palomar	NEAT	·	4.1 km	MPC · JPL
127030 Herrington	2002 GZ_{28}	Herrington	April 6, 2002	Cerro Tololo	M. W. Buie	·	2.7 km	MPC · JPL
127031	2002 GM_{33}	—	April 1, 2002	Palomar	NEAT	·	1.8 km	MPC · JPL
127032	2002 GR_{33}	—	April 1, 2002	Palomar	NEAT	EOS	3.4 km	MPC · JPL
127033	2002 GU_{33}	—	April 1, 2002	Palomar	NEAT	EOS	4.6 km	MPC · JPL
127034	2002 GP_{34}	—	April 2, 2002	Palomar	NEAT	PHO	2.4 km	MPC · JPL
127035	2002 GU_{34}	—	April 2, 2002	Palomar	NEAT	·	4.5 km	MPC · JPL
127036	2002 GZ_{34}	—	April 2, 2002	Palomar	NEAT	·	2.7 km	MPC · JPL
127037	2002 GB_{35}	—	April 1, 2002	Palomar	NEAT	PHO	3.1 km	MPC · JPL
127038	2002 GR_{35}	—	April 2, 2002	Kitt Peak	Spacewatch	·	2.3 km	MPC · JPL
127039	2002 GJ_{36}	—	April 2, 2002	Kitt Peak	Spacewatch	·	2.7 km	MPC · JPL
127040	2002 GS_{38}	—	April 2, 2002	Kitt Peak	Spacewatch	KOR	2.8 km	MPC · JPL
127041	2002 GH_{39}	—	April 4, 2002	Palomar	NEAT	·	3.8 km	MPC · JPL
127042	2002 GV_{39}	—	April 4, 2002	Palomar	NEAT	·	2.5 km	MPC · JPL
127043	2002 GW_{39}	—	April 4, 2002	Palomar	NEAT	·	4.3 km	MPC · JPL
127044	2002 GH_{41}	—	April 4, 2002	Palomar	NEAT	AGN	2.4 km	MPC · JPL
127045	2002 GA_{42}	—	April 4, 2002	Palomar	NEAT	·	3.0 km	MPC · JPL
127046	2002 GK_{42}	—	April 4, 2002	Palomar	NEAT	THM	4.8 km	MPC · JPL
127047	2002 GV_{42}	—	April 4, 2002	Haleakala	NEAT	·	2.8 km	MPC · JPL
127048	2002 GX_{43}	—	April 4, 2002	Palomar	NEAT	·	3.2 km	MPC · JPL
127049	2002 GJ_{44}	—	April 4, 2002	Palomar	NEAT	·	5.5 km	MPC · JPL
127050	2002 GT_{44}	—	April 4, 2002	Palomar	NEAT	·	2.7 km	MPC · JPL
127051	2002 GU_{44}	—	April 4, 2002	Palomar	NEAT	EOS	4.0 km	MPC · JPL
127052	2002 GH_{46}	—	April 2, 2002	Palomar	NEAT	·	3.2 km	MPC · JPL
127053	2002 GP_{46}	—	April 4, 2002	Haleakala	NEAT	VER	7.4 km	MPC · JPL
127054	2002 GD_{47}	—	April 4, 2002	Palomar	NEAT	·	3.3 km	MPC · JPL
127055	2002 GG_{47}	—	April 4, 2002	Haleakala	NEAT	·	2.4 km	MPC · JPL
127056	2002 GO_{47}	—	April 4, 2002	Kitt Peak	Spacewatch	·	2.7 km	MPC · JPL
127057	2002 GV_{47}	—	April 4, 2002	Haleakala	NEAT	·	3.4 km	MPC · JPL
127058	2002 GW_{48}	—	April 4, 2002	Palomar	NEAT	KOR	2.4 km	MPC · JPL
127059	2002 GJ_{50}	—	April 5, 2002	Palomar	NEAT	·	5.0 km	MPC · JPL
127060	2002 GX_{50}	—	April 5, 2002	Anderson Mesa	LONEOS	KOR	2.7 km	MPC · JPL
127061	2002 GA_{51}	—	April 5, 2002	Anderson Mesa	LONEOS	EOS	4.4 km	MPC · JPL
127062	2002 GT_{53}	—	April 5, 2002	Anderson Mesa	LONEOS	EUN	2.2 km	MPC · JPL
127063	2002 GW_{53}	—	April 5, 2002	Anderson Mesa	LONEOS	·	4.5 km	MPC · JPL
127064	2002 GA_{54}	—	April 5, 2002	Anderson Mesa	LONEOS	EUN	3.4 km	MPC · JPL
127065	2002 GH_{55}	—	April 5, 2002	Anderson Mesa	LONEOS	THM	5.0 km	MPC · JPL
127066	2002 GT_{55}	—	April 5, 2002	Palomar	NEAT	·	4.7 km	MPC · JPL
127067	2002 GM_{56}	—	April 5, 2002	Palomar	NEAT	EOS	3.7 km	MPC · JPL
127068	2002 GG_{57}	—	April 8, 2002	Palomar	NEAT	·	4.5 km	MPC · JPL
127069	2002 GK_{57}	—	April 8, 2002	Palomar	NEAT	·	3.4 km	MPC · JPL
127070	2002 GZ_{58}	—	April 8, 2002	Palomar	NEAT	·	4.1 km	MPC · JPL
127071	2002 GT_{60}	—	April 8, 2002	Palomar	NEAT	·	2.8 km	MPC · JPL
127072	2002 GX_{60}	—	April 8, 2002	Palomar	NEAT	·	2.7 km	MPC · JPL
127073	2002 GO_{61}	—	April 8, 2002	Palomar	NEAT	·	4.2 km	MPC · JPL
127074	2002 GS_{61}	—	April 8, 2002	Palomar	NEAT	·	3.9 km	MPC · JPL
127075	2002 GU_{64}	—	April 8, 2002	Palomar	NEAT	·	2.1 km	MPC · JPL
127076	2002 GY_{64}	—	April 8, 2002	Palomar	NEAT	·	5.6 km	MPC · JPL
127077	2002 GD_{65}	—	April 6, 2002	Socorro	LINEAR	·	4.3 km	MPC · JPL
127078	2002 GM_{65}	—	April 8, 2002	Kitt Peak	Spacewatch	·	2.8 km	MPC · JPL
127079	2002 GO_{65}	—	April 8, 2002	Palomar	NEAT	·	3.7 km	MPC · JPL
127080	2002 GT_{65}	—	April 8, 2002	Palomar	NEAT	·	3.6 km	MPC · JPL
127081	2002 GK_{67}	—	April 8, 2002	Palomar	NEAT	·	3.4 km	MPC · JPL
127082	2002 GB_{70}	—	April 8, 2002	Palomar	NEAT	·	4.6 km	MPC · JPL
127083	2002 GO_{70}	—	April 8, 2002	Palomar	NEAT	HOF	5.2 km	MPC · JPL
127084	2002 GF_{71}	—	April 9, 2002	Anderson Mesa	LONEOS	·	3.4 km	MPC · JPL
127085	2002 GX_{73}	—	April 9, 2002	Anderson Mesa	LONEOS	GEF	2.3 km	MPC · JPL
127086	2002 GD_{74}	—	April 9, 2002	Socorro	LINEAR	·	4.2 km	MPC · JPL
127087	2002 GJ_{74}	—	April 9, 2002	Palomar	NEAT	·	3.2 km	MPC · JPL
127088	2002 GC_{76}	—	April 9, 2002	Kitt Peak	Spacewatch	·	1.8 km	MPC · JPL
127089	2002 GU_{76}	—	April 9, 2002	Palomar	NEAT	·	4.0 km	MPC · JPL
127090	2002 GB_{77}	—	April 9, 2002	Anderson Mesa	LONEOS	·	3.7 km	MPC · JPL
127091	2002 GZ_{78}	—	April 10, 2002	Palomar	NEAT	ARM	6.7 km	MPC · JPL
127092	2002 GD_{80}	—	April 10, 2002	Socorro	LINEAR	·	4.3 km	MPC · JPL
127093	2002 GL_{81}	—	April 10, 2002	Socorro	LINEAR	·	3.5 km	MPC · JPL
127094	2002 GE_{82}	—	April 10, 2002	Socorro	LINEAR	·	6.7 km	MPC · JPL
127095	2002 GC_{83}	—	April 10, 2002	Socorro	LINEAR	·	4.6 km	MPC · JPL
127096	2002 GJ_{83}	—	April 10, 2002	Socorro	LINEAR	(5)	2.2 km	MPC · JPL
127097	2002 GB_{84}	—	April 10, 2002	Socorro	LINEAR	GEF	2.5 km	MPC · JPL
127098	2002 GJ_{84}	—	April 10, 2002	Socorro	LINEAR	·	6.5 km	MPC · JPL
127099	2002 GN_{84}	—	April 10, 2002	Socorro	LINEAR	·	7.3 km	MPC · JPL
127100	2002 GR_{84}	—	April 10, 2002	Socorro	LINEAR	·	8.2 km	MPC · JPL

== 127101–127200 ==
back to top

Designation			Discovery			Properties		Ref
Permanent	Provisional	Named after	Date	Site	Discoverer(s)	Category	Diam.	Ref
127101	2002 GR_{85}	—	April 10, 2002	Socorro	LINEAR	·	4.4 km	MPC · JPL
127102	2002 GD_{86}	—	April 10, 2002	Socorro	LINEAR	(194)	2.8 km	MPC · JPL
127103	2002 GQ_{87}	—	April 10, 2002	Socorro	LINEAR	·	6.8 km	MPC · JPL
127104	2002 GJ_{88}	—	April 10, 2002	Socorro	LINEAR	·	3.1 km	MPC · JPL
127105	2002 GL_{88}	—	April 10, 2002	Palomar	NEAT	·	3.9 km	MPC · JPL
127106	2002 GU_{90}	—	April 8, 2002	Palomar	NEAT	·	3.4 km	MPC · JPL
127107	2002 GK_{91}	—	April 9, 2002	Kitt Peak	Spacewatch	·	3.3 km	MPC · JPL
127108	2002 GJ_{93}	—	April 9, 2002	Socorro	LINEAR	·	2.5 km	MPC · JPL
127109	2002 GN_{93}	—	April 9, 2002	Socorro	LINEAR	·	3.1 km	MPC · JPL
127110	2002 GE_{96}	—	April 9, 2002	Socorro	LINEAR	·	3.4 km	MPC · JPL
127111	2002 GG_{96}	—	April 9, 2002	Socorro	LINEAR	DOR	4.3 km	MPC · JPL
127112	2002 GP_{96}	—	April 9, 2002	Socorro	LINEAR	·	3.1 km	MPC · JPL
127113	2002 GO_{97}	—	April 9, 2002	Kitt Peak	Spacewatch	·	1.8 km	MPC · JPL
127114	2002 GC_{98}	—	April 10, 2002	Socorro	LINEAR	·	2.3 km	MPC · JPL
127115	2002 GG_{99}	—	April 10, 2002	Socorro	LINEAR	HNS	2.4 km	MPC · JPL
127116	2002 GY_{99}	—	April 10, 2002	Socorro	LINEAR	·	2.1 km	MPC · JPL
127117	2002 GP_{100}	—	April 10, 2002	Socorro	LINEAR	(13314)	3.7 km	MPC · JPL
127118	2002 GF_{101}	—	April 10, 2002	Socorro	LINEAR	·	4.6 km	MPC · JPL
127119	2002 GK_{101}	—	April 10, 2002	Socorro	LINEAR	·	3.4 km	MPC · JPL
127120	2002 GU_{101}	—	April 10, 2002	Socorro	LINEAR	·	1.4 km	MPC · JPL
127121	2002 GZ_{101}	—	April 10, 2002	Socorro	LINEAR	·	3.0 km	MPC · JPL
127122	2002 GB_{102}	—	April 10, 2002	Socorro	LINEAR	VER	5.8 km	MPC · JPL
127123	2002 GE_{102}	—	April 10, 2002	Socorro	LINEAR	·	3.0 km	MPC · JPL
127124	2002 GJ_{102}	—	April 10, 2002	Socorro	LINEAR	·	4.1 km	MPC · JPL
127125	2002 GP_{102}	—	April 10, 2002	Socorro	LINEAR	GEF	2.7 km	MPC · JPL
127126	2002 GW_{102}	—	April 10, 2002	Socorro	LINEAR	·	2.6 km	MPC · JPL
127127	2002 GQ_{103}	—	April 10, 2002	Socorro	LINEAR	·	2.4 km	MPC · JPL
127128	2002 GJ_{104}	—	April 10, 2002	Socorro	LINEAR	GEF	2.1 km	MPC · JPL
127129	2002 GQ_{104}	—	April 10, 2002	Socorro	LINEAR	·	4.3 km	MPC · JPL
127130	2002 GG_{105}	—	April 11, 2002	Anderson Mesa	LONEOS	·	2.5 km	MPC · JPL
127131	2002 GD_{106}	—	April 11, 2002	Anderson Mesa	LONEOS	·	4.1 km	MPC · JPL
127132	2002 GE_{106}	—	April 11, 2002	Anderson Mesa	LONEOS	·	3.7 km	MPC · JPL
127133	2002 GS_{106}	—	April 11, 2002	Anderson Mesa	LONEOS	ADE	4.2 km	MPC · JPL
127134	2002 GM_{107}	—	April 11, 2002	Socorro	LINEAR	·	4.0 km	MPC · JPL
127135	2002 GQ_{109}	—	April 11, 2002	Palomar	NEAT	·	5.3 km	MPC · JPL
127136	2002 GB_{110}	—	April 10, 2002	Socorro	LINEAR	·	2.4 km	MPC · JPL
127137	2002 GM_{111}	—	April 10, 2002	Socorro	LINEAR	·	1.7 km	MPC · JPL
127138	2002 GD_{112}	—	April 10, 2002	Socorro	LINEAR	·	3.8 km	MPC · JPL
127139	2002 GG_{112}	—	April 10, 2002	Socorro	LINEAR	MRX	2.4 km	MPC · JPL
127140	2002 GT_{113}	—	April 11, 2002	Socorro	LINEAR	·	2.6 km	MPC · JPL
127141	2002 GC_{114}	—	April 11, 2002	Socorro	LINEAR	·	4.2 km	MPC · JPL
127142	2002 GP_{114}	—	April 11, 2002	Socorro	LINEAR	·	4.0 km	MPC · JPL
127143	2002 GX_{115}	—	April 11, 2002	Socorro	LINEAR	·	7.3 km	MPC · JPL
127144	2002 GK_{117}	—	April 11, 2002	Socorro	LINEAR	·	2.8 km	MPC · JPL
127145	2002 GO_{119}	—	April 12, 2002	Palomar	NEAT	·	5.4 km	MPC · JPL
127146	2002 GT_{120}	—	April 12, 2002	Palomar	NEAT	615	2.3 km	MPC · JPL
127147	2002 GA_{122}	—	April 10, 2002	Socorro	LINEAR	·	2.3 km	MPC · JPL
127148	2002 GT_{123}	—	April 11, 2002	Socorro	LINEAR	·	3.1 km	MPC · JPL
127149	2002 GZ_{125}	—	April 12, 2002	Socorro	LINEAR	HOF	4.4 km	MPC · JPL
127150	2002 GH_{126}	—	April 12, 2002	Palomar	NEAT	·	5.4 km	MPC · JPL
127151	2002 GX_{126}	—	April 12, 2002	Socorro	LINEAR	·	1.4 km	MPC · JPL
127152	2002 GV_{127}	—	April 12, 2002	Socorro	LINEAR	·	2.6 km	MPC · JPL
127153	2002 GD_{132}	—	April 12, 2002	Socorro	LINEAR	KOR	2.8 km	MPC · JPL
127154	2002 GM_{133}	—	April 12, 2002	Socorro	LINEAR	·	3.6 km	MPC · JPL
127155	2002 GR_{135}	—	April 12, 2002	Socorro	LINEAR	·	2.1 km	MPC · JPL
127156	2002 GV_{136}	—	April 12, 2002	Socorro	LINEAR	EOS	3.1 km	MPC · JPL
127157	2002 GE_{139}	—	April 13, 2002	Kitt Peak	Spacewatch	·	3.4 km	MPC · JPL
127158	2002 GM_{139}	—	April 13, 2002	Kitt Peak	Spacewatch	·	3.0 km	MPC · JPL
127159	2002 GA_{140}	—	April 13, 2002	Palomar	NEAT	·	3.3 km	MPC · JPL
127160	2002 GS_{140}	—	April 13, 2002	Palomar	NEAT	EOS	3.5 km	MPC · JPL
127161	2002 GS_{143}	—	April 13, 2002	Kitt Peak	Spacewatch	·	4.0 km	MPC · JPL
127162	2002 GF_{144}	—	April 11, 2002	Palomar	NEAT	·	2.5 km	MPC · JPL
127163	2002 GH_{144}	—	April 11, 2002	Palomar	NEAT	·	2.2 km	MPC · JPL
127164	2002 GC_{149}	—	April 14, 2002	Kitt Peak	Spacewatch	AGN	1.9 km	MPC · JPL
127165	2002 GK_{149}	—	April 14, 2002	Socorro	LINEAR	AGN	2.0 km	MPC · JPL
127166	2002 GP_{149}	—	April 14, 2002	Socorro	LINEAR	AGN	2.1 km	MPC · JPL
127167	2002 GP_{150}	—	April 14, 2002	Socorro	LINEAR	·	5.2 km	MPC · JPL
127168	2002 GQ_{151}	—	April 14, 2002	Palomar	NEAT	BRA	3.3 km	MPC · JPL
127169	2002 GX_{151}	—	April 12, 2002	Palomar	NEAT	·	2.7 km	MPC · JPL
127170	2002 GM_{152}	—	April 12, 2002	Palomar	NEAT	·	3.1 km	MPC · JPL
127171	2002 GL_{153}	—	April 12, 2002	Palomar	NEAT	EOS	5.4 km	MPC · JPL
127172	2002 GF_{154}	—	April 13, 2002	Palomar	NEAT	·	6.6 km	MPC · JPL
127173	2002 GT_{155}	—	April 13, 2002	Palomar	NEAT	·	4.3 km	MPC · JPL
127174	2002 GZ_{155}	—	April 13, 2002	Palomar	NEAT	·	3.5 km	MPC · JPL
127175	2002 GZ_{157}	—	April 13, 2002	Palomar	NEAT	·	4.5 km	MPC · JPL
127176	2002 GC_{159}	—	April 14, 2002	Socorro	LINEAR	·	3.6 km	MPC · JPL
127177	2002 GK_{160}	—	April 15, 2002	Palomar	NEAT	·	5.1 km	MPC · JPL
127178	2002 GN_{160}	—	April 15, 2002	Palomar	NEAT	·	6.1 km	MPC · JPL
127179	2002 GB_{161}	—	April 15, 2002	Anderson Mesa	LONEOS	·	3.5 km	MPC · JPL
127180	2002 GQ_{163}	—	April 14, 2002	Kitt Peak	Spacewatch	·	3.3 km	MPC · JPL
127181	2002 GQ_{165}	—	April 15, 2002	Socorro	LINEAR	·	2.6 km	MPC · JPL
127182	2002 GC_{166}	—	April 15, 2002	Anderson Mesa	LONEOS	·	2.6 km	MPC · JPL
127183	2002 GW_{167}	—	April 9, 2002	Socorro	LINEAR	·	2.8 km	MPC · JPL
127184	2002 GG_{170}	—	April 9, 2002	Socorro	LINEAR	·	2.8 km	MPC · JPL
127185	2002 GL_{171}	—	April 10, 2002	Socorro	LINEAR	MAR	2.1 km	MPC · JPL
127186	2002 GX_{171}	—	April 10, 2002	Socorro	LINEAR	·	2.8 km	MPC · JPL
127187	2002 GB_{172}	—	April 10, 2002	Socorro	LINEAR	THM	4.1 km	MPC · JPL
127188	2002 GE_{172}	—	April 10, 2002	Socorro	LINEAR	·	3.2 km	MPC · JPL
127189	2002 GL_{172}	—	April 10, 2002	Socorro	LINEAR	KOR	2.3 km	MPC · JPL
127190	2002 GB_{174}	—	April 10, 2002	Socorro	LINEAR	EOS	3.3 km	MPC · JPL
127191	2002 GT_{174}	—	April 11, 2002	Socorro	LINEAR	·	3.6 km	MPC · JPL
127192	2002 GW_{174}	—	April 11, 2002	Socorro	LINEAR	·	3.3 km	MPC · JPL
127193	2002 GB_{176}	—	April 11, 2002	Socorro	LINEAR	ADE	4.4 km	MPC · JPL
127194	2002 GF_{176}	—	April 12, 2002	Socorro	LINEAR	·	3.2 km	MPC · JPL
127195	2002 GK_{177}	—	April 12, 2002	Palomar	White, M., M. Collins	·	4.1 km	MPC · JPL
127196 Hanaceplechová	2002 HH	Hanaceplechová	April 16, 2002	Ondřejov	P. Pravec	·	2.3 km	MPC · JPL
127197	2002 HO	—	April 16, 2002	Desert Eagle	W. K. Y. Yeung	·	2.0 km	MPC · JPL
127198	2002 HF_{1}	—	April 16, 2002	Socorro	LINEAR	·	2.8 km	MPC · JPL
127199	2002 HL_{2}	—	April 16, 2002	Socorro	LINEAR	·	2.4 km	MPC · JPL
127200	2002 HC_{4}	—	April 16, 2002	Socorro	LINEAR	·	7.3 km	MPC · JPL

== 127201–127300 ==
back to top

Designation			Discovery			Properties		Ref
Permanent	Provisional	Named after	Date	Site	Discoverer(s)	Category	Diam.	Ref
127201	2002 HY_{4}	—	April 16, 2002	Socorro	LINEAR	·	5.7 km	MPC · JPL
127202	2002 HQ_{5}	—	April 17, 2002	Socorro	LINEAR	·	5.3 km	MPC · JPL
127203	2002 HP_{6}	—	April 18, 2002	Palomar	NEAT	·	2.8 km	MPC · JPL
127204	2002 HJ_{7}	—	April 18, 2002	Desert Eagle	W. K. Y. Yeung	·	10 km	MPC · JPL
127205	2002 HW_{7}	—	April 20, 2002	Kitt Peak	Spacewatch	·	2.5 km	MPC · JPL
127206	2002 HL_{9}	—	April 16, 2002	Socorro	LINEAR	·	3.6 km	MPC · JPL
127207	2002 HC_{10}	—	April 17, 2002	Socorro	LINEAR	·	4.4 km	MPC · JPL
127208	2002 HM_{10}	—	April 17, 2002	Socorro	LINEAR	·	4.2 km	MPC · JPL
127209	2002 HB_{11}	—	April 18, 2002	Haleakala	NEAT	·	5.3 km	MPC · JPL
127210	2002 HE_{11}	—	April 21, 2002	Palomar	NEAT	·	5.2 km	MPC · JPL
127211	2002 HK_{13}	—	April 22, 2002	Socorro	LINEAR	·	13 km	MPC · JPL
127212	2002 HB_{14}	—	April 23, 2002	Palomar	NEAT	·	3.0 km	MPC · JPL
127213	2002 HS_{14}	—	April 17, 2002	Socorro	LINEAR	·	3.3 km	MPC · JPL
127214	2002 HC_{15}	—	April 17, 2002	Socorro	LINEAR	·	5.6 km	MPC · JPL
127215	2002 HY_{15}	—	April 17, 2002	Socorro	LINEAR	EUN	3.5 km	MPC · JPL
127216	2002 HC_{16}	—	April 18, 2002	Kitt Peak	Spacewatch	·	3.8 km	MPC · JPL
127217	2002 HS_{17}	—	April 16, 2002	Socorro	LINEAR	·	3.0 km	MPC · JPL
127218	2002 JE	—	May 3, 2002	Desert Eagle	W. K. Y. Yeung	·	3.8 km	MPC · JPL
127219	2002 JR_{3}	—	May 3, 2002	Anderson Mesa	LONEOS	·	2.7 km	MPC · JPL
127220	2002 JT_{3}	—	May 3, 2002	Anderson Mesa	LONEOS	·	2.1 km	MPC · JPL
127221	2002 JC_{4}	—	May 5, 2002	Socorro	LINEAR	GAL	2.7 km	MPC · JPL
127222	2002 JV_{5}	—	May 5, 2002	Palomar	NEAT	·	4.8 km	MPC · JPL
127223	2002 JW_{5}	—	May 5, 2002	Palomar	NEAT	·	4.4 km	MPC · JPL
127224	2002 JJ_{6}	—	May 6, 2002	Kitt Peak	Spacewatch	(5)	2.0 km	MPC · JPL
127225	2002 JP_{7}	—	May 4, 2002	Palomar	NEAT	·	6.6 km	MPC · JPL
127226	2002 JQ_{8}	—	May 6, 2002	Palomar	NEAT	·	1.9 km	MPC · JPL
127227	2002 JS_{8}	—	May 5, 2002	Anderson Mesa	LONEOS	BRA	2.4 km	MPC · JPL
127228	2002 JU_{10}	—	May 7, 2002	Socorro	LINEAR	·	11 km	MPC · JPL
127229	2002 JH_{11}	—	May 2, 2002	Anderson Mesa	LONEOS	·	4.4 km	MPC · JPL
127230	2002 JO_{14}	—	May 7, 2002	Socorro	LINEAR	·	4.0 km	MPC · JPL
127231	2002 JM_{15}	—	May 8, 2002	Socorro	LINEAR	DOR	5.4 km	MPC · JPL
127232	2002 JQ_{16}	—	May 6, 2002	Palomar	NEAT	ADE	5.7 km	MPC · JPL
127233	2002 JT_{16}	—	May 6, 2002	Palomar	NEAT	EUN	2.1 km	MPC · JPL
127234	2002 JJ_{17}	—	May 7, 2002	Palomar	NEAT	·	2.4 km	MPC · JPL
127235	2002 JW_{17}	—	May 7, 2002	Palomar	NEAT	·	2.3 km	MPC · JPL
127236	2002 JS_{18}	—	May 7, 2002	Palomar	NEAT	·	5.6 km	MPC · JPL
127237	2002 JC_{19}	—	May 7, 2002	Palomar	NEAT	·	5.2 km	MPC · JPL
127238	2002 JS_{20}	—	May 7, 2002	Palomar	NEAT	·	3.8 km	MPC · JPL
127239	2002 JA_{21}	—	May 8, 2002	Haleakala	NEAT	·	3.1 km	MPC · JPL
127240	2002 JM_{25}	—	May 8, 2002	Socorro	LINEAR	EUN	2.6 km	MPC · JPL
127241	2002 JM_{26}	—	May 8, 2002	Socorro	LINEAR	·	2.2 km	MPC · JPL
127242	2002 JG_{28}	—	May 9, 2002	Socorro	LINEAR	·	2.1 km	MPC · JPL
127243	2002 JH_{28}	—	May 9, 2002	Socorro	LINEAR	·	3.8 km	MPC · JPL
127244	2002 JK_{29}	—	May 9, 2002	Socorro	LINEAR	·	5.4 km	MPC · JPL
127245	2002 JG_{30}	—	May 9, 2002	Socorro	LINEAR	·	3.2 km	MPC · JPL
127246	2002 JV_{32}	—	May 9, 2002	Socorro	LINEAR	EOS	3.7 km	MPC · JPL
127247	2002 JF_{34}	—	May 9, 2002	Socorro	LINEAR	·	3.4 km	MPC · JPL
127248	2002 JK_{35}	—	May 9, 2002	Socorro	LINEAR	·	3.8 km	MPC · JPL
127249	2002 JM_{36}	—	May 9, 2002	Socorro	LINEAR	·	4.4 km	MPC · JPL
127250	2002 JY_{37}	—	May 8, 2002	Haleakala	NEAT	·	1.7 km	MPC · JPL
127251	2002 JD_{38}	—	May 8, 2002	Haleakala	NEAT	·	6.0 km	MPC · JPL
127252	2002 JM_{39}	—	May 9, 2002	Desert Eagle	W. K. Y. Yeung	MAR	2.3 km	MPC · JPL
127253	2002 JQ_{39}	—	May 10, 2002	Desert Eagle	W. K. Y. Yeung	T_{j} (2.98)	12 km	MPC · JPL
127254	2002 JJ_{42}	—	May 8, 2002	Socorro	LINEAR	·	3.1 km	MPC · JPL
127255	2002 JX_{42}	—	May 8, 2002	Socorro	LINEAR	AGN	2.3 km	MPC · JPL
127256	2002 JB_{43}	—	May 9, 2002	Socorro	LINEAR	·	7.4 km	MPC · JPL
127257	2002 JZ_{43}	—	May 9, 2002	Socorro	LINEAR	·	4.4 km	MPC · JPL
127258	2002 JC_{45}	—	May 9, 2002	Socorro	LINEAR	·	5.0 km	MPC · JPL
127259	2002 JG_{45}	—	May 9, 2002	Socorro	LINEAR	·	2.5 km	MPC · JPL
127260	2002 JE_{46}	—	May 9, 2002	Socorro	LINEAR	·	4.0 km	MPC · JPL
127261	2002 JE_{47}	—	May 9, 2002	Socorro	LINEAR	·	4.8 km	MPC · JPL
127262	2002 JF_{48}	—	May 9, 2002	Socorro	LINEAR	·	2.0 km	MPC · JPL
127263	2002 JJ_{49}	—	May 9, 2002	Socorro	LINEAR	·	8.4 km	MPC · JPL
127264	2002 JB_{50}	—	May 9, 2002	Socorro	LINEAR	·	2.6 km	MPC · JPL
127265	2002 JX_{50}	—	May 9, 2002	Socorro	LINEAR	·	4.0 km	MPC · JPL
127266	2002 JU_{51}	—	May 9, 2002	Socorro	LINEAR	EOS	4.3 km	MPC · JPL
127267	2002 JY_{53}	—	May 9, 2002	Socorro	LINEAR	·	2.0 km	MPC · JPL
127268	2002 JC_{55}	—	May 9, 2002	Socorro	LINEAR	·	2.4 km	MPC · JPL
127269	2002 JJ_{55}	—	May 9, 2002	Socorro	LINEAR	·	5.5 km	MPC · JPL
127270	2002 JK_{57}	—	May 9, 2002	Socorro	LINEAR	·	3.8 km	MPC · JPL
127271	2002 JL_{60}	—	May 10, 2002	Socorro	LINEAR	·	2.9 km	MPC · JPL
127272	2002 JS_{60}	—	May 5, 2002	Anderson Mesa	LONEOS	·	3.4 km	MPC · JPL
127273	2002 JA_{61}	—	May 11, 2002	Kitt Peak	Spacewatch	KOR	2.7 km	MPC · JPL
127274	2002 JE_{61}	—	May 8, 2002	Socorro	LINEAR	·	5.0 km	MPC · JPL
127275	2002 JB_{63}	—	May 8, 2002	Socorro	LINEAR	·	2.7 km	MPC · JPL
127276	2002 JF_{65}	—	May 9, 2002	Socorro	LINEAR	·	1.7 km	MPC · JPL
127277	2002 JV_{65}	—	May 9, 2002	Socorro	LINEAR	·	2.7 km	MPC · JPL
127278	2002 JC_{66}	—	May 9, 2002	Socorro	LINEAR	AEO	3.3 km	MPC · JPL
127279	2002 JY_{66}	—	May 10, 2002	Socorro	LINEAR	THM	5.3 km	MPC · JPL
127280	2002 JK_{67}	—	May 10, 2002	Socorro	LINEAR	·	3.1 km	MPC · JPL
127281	2002 JA_{69}	—	May 7, 2002	Socorro	LINEAR	·	3.2 km	MPC · JPL
127282	2002 JD_{69}	—	May 7, 2002	Socorro	LINEAR	·	4.5 km	MPC · JPL
127283	2002 JQ_{69}	—	May 7, 2002	Socorro	LINEAR	RAF	1.7 km	MPC · JPL
127284	2002 JF_{70}	—	May 7, 2002	Socorro	LINEAR	DOR	5.3 km	MPC · JPL
127285	2002 JG_{70}	—	May 7, 2002	Socorro	LINEAR	DOR	4.5 km	MPC · JPL
127286	2002 JC_{71}	—	May 8, 2002	Socorro	LINEAR	·	4.1 km	MPC · JPL
127287	2002 JR_{72}	—	May 8, 2002	Socorro	LINEAR	·	2.0 km	MPC · JPL
127288	2002 JV_{74}	—	May 9, 2002	Socorro	LINEAR	·	3.6 km	MPC · JPL
127289	2002 JD_{75}	—	May 9, 2002	Socorro	LINEAR	AEO	3.3 km	MPC · JPL
127290	2002 JM_{77}	—	May 11, 2002	Socorro	LINEAR	EOS	4.2 km	MPC · JPL
127291	2002 JT_{77}	—	May 11, 2002	Socorro	LINEAR	KOR	2.6 km	MPC · JPL
127292	2002 JJ_{78}	—	May 11, 2002	Socorro	LINEAR	·	2.3 km	MPC · JPL
127293	2002 JL_{78}	—	May 11, 2002	Socorro	LINEAR	AGN	2.3 km	MPC · JPL
127294	2002 JN_{79}	—	May 11, 2002	Socorro	LINEAR	NEM	4.3 km	MPC · JPL
127295	2002 JE_{80}	—	May 11, 2002	Socorro	LINEAR	KOR	2.7 km	MPC · JPL
127296	2002 JV_{80}	—	May 11, 2002	Socorro	LINEAR	·	5.3 km	MPC · JPL
127297	2002 JD_{81}	—	May 11, 2002	Socorro	LINEAR	(5)	2.1 km	MPC · JPL
127298	2002 JG_{81}	—	May 11, 2002	Socorro	LINEAR	·	2.1 km	MPC · JPL
127299	2002 JU_{81}	—	May 11, 2002	Socorro	LINEAR	·	4.8 km	MPC · JPL
127300	2002 JN_{83}	—	May 11, 2002	Socorro	LINEAR	HYG	4.6 km	MPC · JPL

== 127301–127400 ==
back to top

Designation			Discovery			Properties		Ref
Permanent	Provisional	Named after	Date	Site	Discoverer(s)	Category	Diam.	Ref
127301	2002 JX_{84}	—	May 11, 2002	Socorro	LINEAR	·	3.3 km	MPC · JPL
127302	2002 JM_{85}	—	May 11, 2002	Socorro	LINEAR	·	5.9 km	MPC · JPL
127303	2002 JG_{86}	—	May 11, 2002	Socorro	LINEAR	THM	5.5 km	MPC · JPL
127304	2002 JA_{87}	—	May 11, 2002	Socorro	LINEAR	NYS	2.0 km	MPC · JPL
127305	2002 JJ_{87}	—	May 11, 2002	Socorro	LINEAR	HYG	4.4 km	MPC · JPL
127306	2002 JR_{88}	—	May 11, 2002	Socorro	LINEAR	KOR	2.6 km	MPC · JPL
127307	2002 JT_{88}	—	May 11, 2002	Socorro	LINEAR	LIX	6.1 km	MPC · JPL
127308	2002 JF_{89}	—	May 11, 2002	Socorro	LINEAR	·	5.1 km	MPC · JPL
127309	2002 JN_{89}	—	May 11, 2002	Socorro	LINEAR	KOR	2.4 km	MPC · JPL
127310	2002 JT_{90}	—	May 11, 2002	Socorro	LINEAR	·	970 m	MPC · JPL
127311	2002 JV_{90}	—	May 11, 2002	Socorro	LINEAR	EOS	3.6 km	MPC · JPL
127312	2002 JC_{91}	—	May 11, 2002	Socorro	LINEAR	CYB	7.4 km	MPC · JPL
127313	2002 JJ_{94}	—	May 11, 2002	Socorro	LINEAR	·	1.9 km	MPC · JPL
127314	2002 JN_{94}	—	May 11, 2002	Socorro	LINEAR	·	4.2 km	MPC · JPL
127315	2002 JL_{96}	—	May 11, 2002	Socorro	LINEAR	·	2.7 km	MPC · JPL
127316	2002 JW_{96}	—	May 9, 2002	Haleakala	NEAT	·	5.7 km	MPC · JPL
127317	2002 JA_{97}	—	May 11, 2002	Palomar	NEAT	·	6.0 km	MPC · JPL
127318	2002 JT_{97}	—	May 8, 2002	Socorro	LINEAR	·	4.6 km	MPC · JPL
127319	2002 JB_{99}	—	May 13, 2002	Palomar	NEAT	·	6.3 km	MPC · JPL
127320	2002 JC_{99}	—	May 13, 2002	Palomar	NEAT	·	4.2 km	MPC · JPL
127321	2002 JW_{99}	—	May 8, 2002	Socorro	LINEAR	EUN	2.5 km	MPC · JPL
127322	2002 JE_{100}	—	May 14, 2002	Reedy Creek	J. Broughton	EUP	8.1 km	MPC · JPL
127323	2002 JL_{100}	—	May 7, 2002	Socorro	LINEAR	·	9.2 km	MPC · JPL
127324	2002 JP_{100}	—	May 15, 2002	Fountain Hills	Hills, Fountain	·	2.7 km	MPC · JPL
127325	2002 JN_{101}	—	May 9, 2002	Socorro	LINEAR	·	4.6 km	MPC · JPL
127326	2002 JL_{102}	—	May 9, 2002	Socorro	LINEAR	·	4.7 km	MPC · JPL
127327	2002 JS_{103}	—	May 10, 2002	Socorro	LINEAR	·	3.2 km	MPC · JPL
127328	2002 JH_{105}	—	May 12, 2002	Socorro	LINEAR	·	5.9 km	MPC · JPL
127329	2002 JZ_{107}	—	May 14, 2002	Palomar	NEAT	·	3.5 km	MPC · JPL
127330	2002 JL_{108}	—	May 14, 2002	Palomar	NEAT	·	7.0 km	MPC · JPL
127331	2002 JX_{109}	—	May 11, 2002	Socorro	LINEAR	·	5.3 km	MPC · JPL
127332	2002 JW_{110}	—	May 11, 2002	Socorro	LINEAR	(13314)	4.3 km	MPC · JPL
127333	2002 JQ_{111}	—	May 11, 2002	Socorro	LINEAR	·	4.3 km	MPC · JPL
127334	2002 JX_{111}	—	May 11, 2002	Socorro	LINEAR	·	6.1 km	MPC · JPL
127335	2002 JB_{113}	—	May 13, 2002	Palomar	NEAT	EUN	2.8 km	MPC · JPL
127336	2002 JB_{115}	—	May 13, 2002	Socorro	LINEAR	VER	5.5 km	MPC · JPL
127337	2002 JK_{117}	—	May 4, 2002	Palomar	NEAT	·	4.7 km	MPC · JPL
127338	2002 JE_{118}	—	May 4, 2002	Palomar	NEAT	·	6.2 km	MPC · JPL
127339	2002 JK_{118}	—	May 5, 2002	Palomar	NEAT	EUN	2.2 km	MPC · JPL
127340	2002 JN_{118}	—	May 5, 2002	Palomar	NEAT	(1118)	6.7 km	MPC · JPL
127341	2002 JO_{118}	—	May 5, 2002	Palomar	NEAT	·	3.6 km	MPC · JPL
127342	2002 JU_{118}	—	May 5, 2002	Palomar	NEAT	·	7.0 km	MPC · JPL
127343	2002 JE_{119}	—	May 5, 2002	Palomar	NEAT	·	3.8 km	MPC · JPL
127344	2002 JP_{119}	—	May 5, 2002	Palomar	NEAT	·	4.8 km	MPC · JPL
127345	2002 JQ_{119}	—	May 5, 2002	Palomar	NEAT	·	4.1 km	MPC · JPL
127346	2002 JU_{119}	—	May 5, 2002	Palomar	NEAT	·	2.4 km	MPC · JPL
127347	2002 JT_{120}	—	May 5, 2002	Palomar	NEAT	·	4.4 km	MPC · JPL
127348	2002 JV_{120}	—	May 5, 2002	Palomar	NEAT	·	2.8 km	MPC · JPL
127349	2002 JU_{121}	—	May 5, 2002	Palomar	NEAT	·	3.2 km	MPC · JPL
127350	2002 JB_{122}	—	May 6, 2002	Palomar	NEAT	·	5.6 km	MPC · JPL
127351	2002 JD_{123}	—	May 6, 2002	Palomar	NEAT	·	6.6 km	MPC · JPL
127352	2002 JC_{124}	—	May 6, 2002	Palomar	NEAT	·	5.4 km	MPC · JPL
127353	2002 JU_{125}	—	May 7, 2002	Palomar	NEAT	·	3.4 km	MPC · JPL
127354	2002 JF_{126}	—	May 7, 2002	Socorro	LINEAR	·	6.4 km	MPC · JPL
127355	2002 JX_{126}	—	May 7, 2002	Anderson Mesa	LONEOS	·	6.3 km	MPC · JPL
127356	2002 JB_{128}	—	May 7, 2002	Palomar	NEAT	·	3.9 km	MPC · JPL
127357	2002 JP_{128}	—	May 7, 2002	Palomar	NEAT	·	2.5 km	MPC · JPL
127358	2002 JF_{129}	—	May 8, 2002	Kitt Peak	Spacewatch	·	2.0 km	MPC · JPL
127359	2002 JH_{129}	—	May 8, 2002	Kitt Peak	Spacewatch	·	5.8 km	MPC · JPL
127360	2002 JM_{132}	—	May 9, 2002	Palomar	NEAT	·	4.5 km	MPC · JPL
127361	2002 JY_{132}	—	May 9, 2002	Socorro	LINEAR	·	3.6 km	MPC · JPL
127362	2002 JF_{134}	—	May 9, 2002	Palomar	NEAT	·	2.5 km	MPC · JPL
127363	2002 JG_{134}	—	May 9, 2002	Palomar	NEAT	·	6.2 km	MPC · JPL
127364	2002 JN_{134}	—	May 9, 2002	Palomar	NEAT	·	2.4 km	MPC · JPL
127365	2002 JO_{134}	—	May 9, 2002	Palomar	NEAT	·	3.2 km	MPC · JPL
127366	2002 JG_{135}	—	May 9, 2002	Kitt Peak	Spacewatch	TEL	3.1 km	MPC · JPL
127367	2002 JZ_{135}	—	May 9, 2002	Palomar	NEAT	THM	4.1 km	MPC · JPL
127368	2002 JC_{136}	—	May 9, 2002	Palomar	NEAT	V	940 m	MPC · JPL
127369	2002 JC_{143}	—	May 12, 2002	Palomar	NEAT	DOR	5.4 km	MPC · JPL
127370	2002 JJ_{144}	—	May 13, 2002	Palomar	NEAT	·	9.4 km	MPC · JPL
127371	2002 JT_{144}	—	May 13, 2002	Palomar	NEAT	·	5.9 km	MPC · JPL
127372	2002 JF_{145}	—	May 13, 2002	Palomar	NEAT	·	7.0 km	MPC · JPL
127373	2002 JT_{145}	—	May 14, 2002	Palomar	NEAT	·	6.2 km	MPC · JPL
127374	2002 KE	—	May 16, 2002	Fountain Hills	Hills, Fountain	·	3.4 km	MPC · JPL
127375	2002 KN	—	May 16, 2002	Socorro	LINEAR	·	6.6 km	MPC · JPL
127376	2002 KH_{1}	—	May 17, 2002	Socorro	LINEAR	H	980 m	MPC · JPL
127377	2002 KP_{2}	—	May 17, 2002	Palomar	NEAT	THM	5.3 km	MPC · JPL
127378	2002 KZ_{2}	—	May 18, 2002	Palomar	NEAT	THM	4.7 km	MPC · JPL
127379	2002 KR_{3}	—	May 17, 2002	Socorro	LINEAR	·	8.7 km	MPC · JPL
127380	2002 KR_{5}	—	May 16, 2002	Socorro	LINEAR	·	4.7 km	MPC · JPL
127381	2002 KT_{5}	—	May 16, 2002	Socorro	LINEAR	·	4.2 km	MPC · JPL
127382	2002 KQ_{6}	—	May 27, 2002	Palomar	NEAT	·	4.8 km	MPC · JPL
127383	2002 KK_{7}	—	May 28, 2002	Palomar	NEAT	EUN	2.7 km	MPC · JPL
127384	2002 KS_{13}	—	May 19, 2002	Palomar	NEAT	EOS	3.9 km	MPC · JPL
127385	2002 KT_{14}	—	May 30, 2002	Palomar	NEAT	·	5.6 km	MPC · JPL
127386	2002 LB_{2}	—	June 2, 2002	Palomar	NEAT	·	5.0 km	MPC · JPL
127387	2002 LR_{4}	—	June 5, 2002	Socorro	LINEAR	·	5.1 km	MPC · JPL
127388	2002 LF_{5}	—	June 6, 2002	Fountain Hills	C. W. Juels, P. R. Holvorcem	·	8.2 km	MPC · JPL
127389	2002 LW_{6}	—	June 1, 2002	Socorro	LINEAR	fast	6.0 km	MPC · JPL
127390	2002 LO_{8}	—	June 5, 2002	Socorro	LINEAR	·	5.8 km	MPC · JPL
127391	2002 LT_{8}	—	June 5, 2002	Socorro	LINEAR	·	5.9 km	MPC · JPL
127392	2002 LJ_{9}	—	June 5, 2002	Socorro	LINEAR	·	5.7 km	MPC · JPL
127393	2002 LL_{10}	—	June 5, 2002	Socorro	LINEAR	·	6.7 km	MPC · JPL
127394	2002 LR_{11}	—	June 5, 2002	Socorro	LINEAR	·	2.1 km	MPC · JPL
127395	2002 LP_{13}	—	June 6, 2002	Socorro	LINEAR	·	6.5 km	MPC · JPL
127396	2002 LQ_{17}	—	June 6, 2002	Socorro	LINEAR	·	4.1 km	MPC · JPL
127397	2002 LQ_{18}	—	June 6, 2002	Socorro	LINEAR	THM	4.3 km	MPC · JPL
127398	2002 LD_{19}	—	June 6, 2002	Socorro	LINEAR	·	3.3 km	MPC · JPL
127399	2002 LT_{21}	—	June 8, 2002	Socorro	LINEAR	·	4.9 km	MPC · JPL
127400	2002 LW_{24}	—	June 2, 2002	Palomar	NEAT	·	6.4 km	MPC · JPL

== 127401–127500 ==
back to top

Designation			Discovery			Properties		Ref
Permanent	Provisional	Named after	Date	Site	Discoverer(s)	Category	Diam.	Ref
127401	2002 LK_{25}	—	June 3, 2002	Socorro	LINEAR	·	4.0 km	MPC · JPL
127402	2002 LP_{27}	—	June 8, 2002	Socorro	LINEAR	·	5.0 km	MPC · JPL
127403	2002 LT_{29}	—	June 9, 2002	Haleakala	NEAT	·	3.7 km	MPC · JPL
127404	2002 LX_{30}	—	June 3, 2002	Palomar	NEAT	THM	5.9 km	MPC · JPL
127405	2002 LT_{32}	—	June 3, 2002	Socorro	LINEAR	·	7.6 km	MPC · JPL
127406	2002 LD_{33}	—	June 3, 2002	Socorro	LINEAR	·	4.7 km	MPC · JPL
127407	2002 LA_{35}	—	June 9, 2002	Palomar	NEAT	·	3.6 km	MPC · JPL
127408	2002 LP_{37}	—	June 12, 2002	Socorro	LINEAR	·	8.9 km	MPC · JPL
127409	2002 LE_{38}	—	June 5, 2002	Palomar	NEAT	TEL	2.8 km	MPC · JPL
127410	2002 LF_{45}	—	June 5, 2002	Palomar	NEAT	·	4.9 km	MPC · JPL
127411	2002 LS_{48}	—	June 10, 2002	Palomar	NEAT	·	5.0 km	MPC · JPL
127412	2002 LA_{51}	—	June 8, 2002	Palomar	NEAT	·	7.1 km	MPC · JPL
127413	2002 LS_{53}	—	June 10, 2002	Socorro	LINEAR	·	4.7 km	MPC · JPL
127414	2002 LQ_{57}	—	June 12, 2002	Socorro	LINEAR	·	6.1 km	MPC · JPL
127415 Annacalderara	2002 NG_{6}	Annacalderara	July 11, 2002	Campo Imperatore	F. Bernardi, M. Tombelli	·	3.2 km	MPC · JPL
127416	2002 NF_{10}	—	July 4, 2002	Palomar	NEAT	THM	3.7 km	MPC · JPL
127417	2002 NK_{11}	—	July 4, 2002	Palomar	NEAT	·	4.4 km	MPC · JPL
127418	2002 NB_{19}	—	July 9, 2002	Socorro	LINEAR	HYG	5.3 km	MPC · JPL
127419	2002 NU_{24}	—	July 9, 2002	Socorro	LINEAR	·	3.8 km	MPC · JPL
127420	2002 NZ_{26}	—	July 9, 2002	Socorro	LINEAR	·	2.1 km	MPC · JPL
127421	2002 OE_{7}	—	July 20, 2002	Palomar	NEAT	·	7.9 km	MPC · JPL
127422	2002 OX_{11}	—	July 18, 2002	Socorro	LINEAR	·	3.3 km	MPC · JPL
127423	2002 OF_{13}	—	July 18, 2002	Socorro	LINEAR	EOS	3.4 km	MPC · JPL
127424	2002 OJ_{15}	—	July 18, 2002	Socorro	LINEAR	·	6.1 km	MPC · JPL
127425	2002 OL_{18}	—	July 18, 2002	Socorro	LINEAR	·	6.8 km	MPC · JPL
127426	2002 OV_{21}	—	July 21, 2002	Palomar	NEAT	T_{j} (2.95) · HIL	6.6 km	MPC · JPL
127427	2002 OE_{23}	—	July 22, 2002	Palomar	NEAT	TIR	5.6 km	MPC · JPL
127428	2002 PX	—	August 1, 2002	Socorro	LINEAR	H	1.1 km	MPC · JPL
127429	2002 PK_{5}	—	August 4, 2002	Palomar	NEAT	·	2.1 km	MPC · JPL
127430	2002 PD_{14}	—	August 6, 2002	Palomar	NEAT	·	1.3 km	MPC · JPL
127431	2002 PB_{15}	—	August 6, 2002	Palomar	NEAT	·	5.1 km	MPC · JPL
127432	2002 PE_{15}	—	August 6, 2002	Palomar	NEAT	·	5.8 km	MPC · JPL
127433	2002 PO_{16}	—	August 6, 2002	Palomar	NEAT	VER	6.6 km	MPC · JPL
127434	2002 PA_{17}	—	August 6, 2002	Palomar	NEAT	·	6.7 km	MPC · JPL
127435	2002 PX_{21}	—	August 6, 2002	Palomar	NEAT	·	6.4 km	MPC · JPL
127436	2002 PD_{32}	—	August 6, 2002	Palomar	NEAT	·	3.7 km	MPC · JPL
127437	2002 PZ_{51}	—	August 8, 2002	Palomar	NEAT	HYG	6.5 km	MPC · JPL
127438	2002 PF_{52}	—	August 8, 2002	Palomar	NEAT	HYG	4.5 km	MPC · JPL
127439	2002 PY_{59}	—	August 10, 2002	Socorro	LINEAR	EUN	2.3 km	MPC · JPL
127440	2002 PE_{66}	—	August 6, 2002	Palomar	NEAT	·	4.8 km	MPC · JPL
127441	2002 PK_{66}	—	August 6, 2002	Palomar	NEAT	·	7.1 km	MPC · JPL
127442	2002 PW_{66}	—	August 6, 2002	Palomar	NEAT	T_{j} (2.97) · 3:2	7.7 km	MPC · JPL
127443	2002 PX_{69}	—	August 11, 2002	Socorro	LINEAR	TIR	6.1 km	MPC · JPL
127444	2002 PQ_{71}	—	August 12, 2002	Socorro	LINEAR	·	4.0 km	MPC · JPL
127445	2002 PP_{84}	—	August 10, 2002	Socorro	LINEAR	·	7.0 km	MPC · JPL
127446	2002 PD_{102}	—	August 12, 2002	Socorro	LINEAR	·	3.2 km	MPC · JPL
127447	2002 PY_{112}	—	August 12, 2002	Socorro	LINEAR	H	850 m	MPC · JPL
127448	2002 PY_{118}	—	August 13, 2002	Anderson Mesa	LONEOS	HIL · 3:2	10 km	MPC · JPL
127449	2002 PM_{124}	—	August 13, 2002	Anderson Mesa	LONEOS	3:2 · SHU	8.8 km	MPC · JPL
127450	2002 PH_{125}	—	August 14, 2002	Socorro	LINEAR	HYG	5.4 km	MPC · JPL
127451	2002 PZ_{140}	—	August 14, 2002	Siding Spring	R. H. McNaught	TIR	6.7 km	MPC · JPL
127452	2002 PN_{156}	—	August 8, 2002	Palomar	S. F. Hönig	·	3.9 km	MPC · JPL
127453	2002 PK_{163}	—	August 8, 2002	Palomar	S. F. Hönig	·	2.3 km	MPC · JPL
127454	2002 PN_{169}	—	August 8, 2002	Palomar	NEAT	·	4.6 km	MPC · JPL
127455	2002 QJ_{6}	—	August 18, 2002	Socorro	LINEAR	H	1.2 km	MPC · JPL
127456	2002 QV_{26}	—	August 29, 2002	Palomar	NEAT	·	4.1 km	MPC · JPL
127457	2002 QM_{28}	—	August 29, 2002	Palomar	NEAT	·	5.5 km	MPC · JPL
127458	2002 QF_{40}	—	August 30, 2002	Palomar	NEAT	(5)	2.2 km	MPC · JPL
127459	2002 QS_{42}	—	August 30, 2002	Palomar	NEAT	AEG	4.1 km	MPC · JPL
127460	2002 QJ_{47}	—	August 30, 2002	Anderson Mesa	LONEOS	EOS	3.7 km	MPC · JPL
127461	2002 QV_{49}	—	August 29, 2002	Palomar	R. Matson	LIX	5.3 km	MPC · JPL
127462	2002 QY_{49}	—	August 29, 2002	Palomar	R. Matson	·	2.8 km	MPC · JPL
127463	2002 QC_{65}	—	August 16, 2002	Palomar	NEAT	·	3.1 km	MPC · JPL
127464	2002 RQ_{6}	—	September 1, 2002	Haleakala	NEAT	·	1.5 km	MPC · JPL
127465	2002 RY_{32}	—	September 4, 2002	Anderson Mesa	LONEOS	·	6.6 km	MPC · JPL
127466	2002 RA_{40}	—	September 5, 2002	Socorro	LINEAR	V	1.3 km	MPC · JPL
127467	2002 RX_{41}	—	September 5, 2002	Socorro	LINEAR	fast	1.1 km	MPC · JPL
127468	2002 RC_{86}	—	September 5, 2002	Socorro	LINEAR	CYB	6.6 km	MPC · JPL
127469	2002 RP_{94}	—	September 5, 2002	Socorro	LINEAR	3:2 · SHU	13 km	MPC · JPL
127470	2002 RY_{98}	—	September 5, 2002	Socorro	LINEAR	THM	9.0 km	MPC · JPL
127471	2002 RD_{110}	—	September 6, 2002	Socorro	LINEAR	V	1.4 km	MPC · JPL
127472	2002 RD_{113}	—	September 5, 2002	Socorro	LINEAR	·	6.5 km	MPC · JPL
127473	2002 RX_{125}	—	September 9, 2002	Drebach	Drebach	·	2.2 km	MPC · JPL
127474	2002 RW_{140}	—	September 10, 2002	Palomar	NEAT	EOS	3.7 km	MPC · JPL
127475	2002 RC_{141}	—	September 10, 2002	Palomar	NEAT	·	1.4 km	MPC · JPL
127476	2002 RF_{153}	—	September 12, 2002	Palomar	NEAT	·	2.0 km	MPC · JPL
127477 Fredalee	2002 RS_{211}	Fredalee	September 14, 2002	Goodricke-Pigott	R. A. Tucker	(5)	1.6 km	MPC · JPL
127478	2002 SX_{19}	—	September 26, 2002	Palomar	NEAT	H	1.0 km	MPC · JPL
127479	2002 SE_{23}	—	September 27, 2002	Palomar	NEAT	·	2.5 km	MPC · JPL
127480	2002 SU_{28}	—	September 28, 2002	Haleakala	NEAT	·	2.7 km	MPC · JPL
127481	2002 ST_{29}	—	September 28, 2002	Haleakala	NEAT	·	5.3 km	MPC · JPL
127482	2002 SK_{36}	—	September 29, 2002	Haleakala	NEAT	·	2.3 km	MPC · JPL
127483	2002 SE_{44}	—	September 29, 2002	Kitt Peak	Spacewatch	·	2.1 km	MPC · JPL
127484	2002 SA_{45}	—	September 29, 2002	Haleakala	NEAT	·	1.3 km	MPC · JPL
127485	2002 ST_{54}	—	September 30, 2002	Haleakala	NEAT	V	1.4 km	MPC · JPL
127486	2002 SJ_{64}	—	September 16, 2002	Palomar	NEAT	·	4.7 km	MPC · JPL
127487	2002 TP_{3}	—	October 1, 2002	Anderson Mesa	LONEOS	THM	7.2 km	MPC · JPL
127488	2002 TE_{11}	—	October 1, 2002	Anderson Mesa	LONEOS	·	1.5 km	MPC · JPL
127489	2002 TN_{16}	—	October 2, 2002	Socorro	LINEAR	·	1.1 km	MPC · JPL
127490	2002 TU_{18}	—	October 2, 2002	Socorro	LINEAR	NYS	2.2 km	MPC · JPL
127491	2002 TV_{21}	—	October 2, 2002	Socorro	LINEAR	·	1.4 km	MPC · JPL
127492	2002 TC_{23}	—	October 2, 2002	Socorro	LINEAR	·	1.4 km	MPC · JPL
127493	2002 TU_{29}	—	October 2, 2002	Socorro	LINEAR	·	1.2 km	MPC · JPL
127494	2002 TR_{30}	—	October 2, 2002	Socorro	LINEAR	·	1.2 km	MPC · JPL
127495	2002 TW_{30}	—	October 2, 2002	Socorro	LINEAR	fast	3.5 km	MPC · JPL
127496	2002 TL_{39}	—	October 2, 2002	Socorro	LINEAR	·	4.8 km	MPC · JPL
127497	2002 TS_{44}	—	October 2, 2002	Socorro	LINEAR	HYG	4.6 km	MPC · JPL
127498	2002 TQ_{47}	—	October 2, 2002	Socorro	LINEAR	·	1.4 km	MPC · JPL
127499	2002 TF_{56}	—	October 1, 2002	Anderson Mesa	LONEOS	·	5.0 km	MPC · JPL
127500	2002 TH_{57}	—	October 3, 2002	Palomar	NEAT	H	880 m	MPC · JPL

== 127501–127600 ==
back to top

Designation			Discovery			Properties		Ref
Permanent	Provisional	Named after	Date	Site	Discoverer(s)	Category	Diam.	Ref
127501	2002 TN_{59}	—	October 3, 2002	Palomar	NEAT	H	1.1 km	MPC · JPL
127502	2002 TP_{59}	—	October 4, 2002	Socorro	LINEAR	H	890 m	MPC · JPL
127503	2002 TR_{59}	—	October 4, 2002	Socorro	LINEAR	H	1.5 km	MPC · JPL
127504	2002 TW_{66}	—	October 6, 2002	Socorro	LINEAR	·	2.4 km	MPC · JPL
127505	2002 TF_{80}	—	October 1, 2002	Socorro	LINEAR	·	4.2 km	MPC · JPL
127506	2002 TA_{91}	—	October 3, 2002	Palomar	NEAT	·	4.9 km	MPC · JPL
127507	2002 TU_{131}	—	October 4, 2002	Socorro	LINEAR	·	1.7 km	MPC · JPL
127508	2002 TU_{216}	—	October 6, 2002	Haleakala	NEAT	(1118)	6.9 km	MPC · JPL
127509	2002 TP_{220}	—	October 6, 2002	Socorro	LINEAR	H	1.2 km	MPC · JPL
127510	2002 TM_{229}	—	October 7, 2002	Socorro	LINEAR	·	4.7 km	MPC · JPL
127511	2002 TY_{233}	—	October 6, 2002	Socorro	LINEAR	·	1.9 km	MPC · JPL
127512	2002 TE_{240}	—	October 9, 2002	Socorro	LINEAR	·	6.6 km	MPC · JPL
127513	2002 TD_{250}	—	October 7, 2002	Socorro	LINEAR	NYS	1.8 km	MPC · JPL
127514	2002 TS_{295}	—	October 13, 2002	Palomar	NEAT	H	1.2 km	MPC · JPL
127515 Nitta	2002 TY_{306}	Nitta	October 4, 2002	Apache Point	SDSS	·	3.2 km	MPC · JPL
127516 Oravetz	2002 TT_{307}	Oravetz	October 4, 2002	Apache Point	SDSS	V	1.0 km	MPC · JPL
127517 Kaikepan	2002 TJ_{371}	Kaikepan	October 10, 2002	Apache Point	SDSS	·	6.8 km	MPC · JPL
127518	2002 UH_{16}	—	October 30, 2002	Palomar	NEAT	V	1.3 km	MPC · JPL
127519	2002 UJ_{16}	—	October 30, 2002	Palomar	NEAT	T_{j} (2.99) · 3:2	9.2 km	MPC · JPL
127520	2002 UQ_{29}	—	October 31, 2002	Palomar	NEAT	H	1 km	MPC · JPL
127521	2002 VK_{14}	—	November 5, 2002	Socorro	LINEAR	·	2.6 km	MPC · JPL
127522	2002 VD_{24}	—	November 5, 2002	Socorro	LINEAR	·	3.2 km	MPC · JPL
127523	2002 VN_{47}	—	November 5, 2002	Socorro	LINEAR	EOS	3.2 km	MPC · JPL
127524	2002 VV_{59}	—	November 3, 2002	Haleakala	NEAT	·	1.5 km	MPC · JPL
127525	2002 VE_{60}	—	November 3, 2002	Haleakala	NEAT	·	4.8 km	MPC · JPL
127526	2002 VU_{100}	—	November 11, 2002	Anderson Mesa	LONEOS	·	6.9 km	MPC · JPL
127527	2002 VT_{114}	—	November 13, 2002	Palomar	NEAT	·	3.9 km	MPC · JPL
127528	2002 VM_{119}	—	November 12, 2002	Socorro	LINEAR	·	2.2 km	MPC · JPL
127529	2002 VL_{125}	—	November 13, 2002	Palomar	NEAT	·	1.8 km	MPC · JPL
127530	2002 VX_{127}	—	November 15, 2002	Palomar	NEAT	H	1.4 km	MPC · JPL
127531	2002 WS_{5}	—	November 23, 2002	Palomar	NEAT	·	1.6 km	MPC · JPL
127532	2002 WH_{9}	—	November 24, 2002	Palomar	NEAT	L5	16 km	MPC · JPL
127533	2002 WZ_{9}	—	November 24, 2002	Palomar	NEAT	·	2.2 km	MPC · JPL
127534	2002 WR_{17}	—	November 30, 2002	Socorro	LINEAR	L5	18 km	MPC · JPL
127535	2002 XL_{14}	—	December 5, 2002	Socorro	LINEAR	·	1.6 km	MPC · JPL
127536	2002 XO_{26}	—	December 3, 2002	Palomar	NEAT	·	5.4 km	MPC · JPL
127537	2002 XU_{29}	—	December 5, 2002	Socorro	LINEAR	·	1.4 km	MPC · JPL
127538	2002 XV_{45}	—	December 10, 2002	Socorro	LINEAR	H	1.0 km	MPC · JPL
127539	2002 XV_{46}	—	December 7, 2002	Socorro	LINEAR	H	1.1 km	MPC · JPL
127540	2002 XQ_{63}	—	December 11, 2002	Socorro	LINEAR	H	1.2 km	MPC · JPL
127541	2002 XZ_{65}	—	December 12, 2002	Socorro	LINEAR	H	1.4 km	MPC · JPL
127542	2002 XR_{66}	—	December 10, 2002	Kitt Peak	Spacewatch	ERI	3.9 km	MPC · JPL
127543	2002 XA_{73}	—	December 11, 2002	Socorro	LINEAR	·	1.6 km	MPC · JPL
127544	2002 XD_{81}	—	December 11, 2002	Socorro	LINEAR	·	1.4 km	MPC · JPL
127545 Crisman	2002 XZ_{91}	Crisman	December 4, 2002	Kitt Peak	Millis, R.	·	1.5 km	MPC · JPL
127546	2002 XU_{93}	—	December 4, 2002	Kitt Peak	M. W. Buie	T_{j} (1.17) · centaur	170 km	MPC · JPL
127547	2002 XG_{94}	—	December 3, 2002	Palomar	S. F. Hönig	RAF	1.8 km	MPC · JPL
127548	2002 YM	—	December 27, 2002	Anderson Mesa	LONEOS	·	1.3 km	MPC · JPL
127549	2002 YH_{1}	—	December 27, 2002	Anderson Mesa	LONEOS	·	1.4 km	MPC · JPL
127550	2002 YB_{2}	—	December 27, 2002	Socorro	LINEAR	H	1.1 km	MPC · JPL
127551	2002 YQ_{3}	—	December 28, 2002	Socorro	LINEAR	H	1.3 km	MPC · JPL
127552	2002 YF_{5}	—	December 28, 2002	Socorro	LINEAR	·	2.7 km	MPC · JPL
127553	2002 YN_{9}	—	December 31, 2002	Socorro	LINEAR	·	4.0 km	MPC · JPL
127554	2002 YW_{9}	—	December 31, 2002	Socorro	LINEAR	·	2.8 km	MPC · JPL
127555	2002 YT_{11}	—	December 31, 2002	Socorro	LINEAR	·	1.6 km	MPC · JPL
127556	2002 YW_{11}	—	December 31, 2002	Kitt Peak	Spacewatch	·	1.7 km	MPC · JPL
127557	2002 YA_{12}	—	December 31, 2002	Socorro	LINEAR	PHO	2.0 km	MPC · JPL
127558	2002 YM_{23}	—	December 31, 2002	Socorro	LINEAR	V	1.4 km	MPC · JPL
127559	2002 YZ_{23}	—	December 31, 2002	Socorro	LINEAR	MAS	1.3 km	MPC · JPL
127560	2002 YQ_{26}	—	December 31, 2002	Socorro	LINEAR	·	1.4 km	MPC · JPL
127561	2002 YC_{28}	—	December 31, 2002	Socorro	LINEAR	MAS	1.3 km	MPC · JPL
127562	2002 YH_{31}	—	December 31, 2002	Socorro	LINEAR	·	950 m	MPC · JPL
127563	2002 YF_{32}	—	December 31, 2002	Haleakala	NEAT	H	1.3 km	MPC · JPL
127564	2003 AX	—	January 1, 2003	Socorro	LINEAR	·	1.6 km	MPC · JPL
127565	2003 AM_{5}	—	January 1, 2003	Socorro	LINEAR	MAS	1.4 km	MPC · JPL
127566	2003 AL_{6}	—	January 1, 2003	Socorro	LINEAR	·	5.8 km	MPC · JPL
127567	2003 AS_{8}	—	January 2, 2003	Anderson Mesa	LONEOS	PHO	2.1 km	MPC · JPL
127568	2003 AV_{9}	—	January 4, 2003	Socorro	LINEAR	·	3.1 km	MPC · JPL
127569	2003 AQ_{13}	—	January 1, 2003	Socorro	LINEAR	·	1.4 km	MPC · JPL
127570	2003 AH_{16}	—	January 1, 2003	Socorro	LINEAR	EUN	2.4 km	MPC · JPL
127571	2003 AM_{17}	—	January 5, 2003	Socorro	LINEAR	H	1.3 km	MPC · JPL
127572	2003 AR_{30}	—	January 4, 2003	Kitt Peak	Spacewatch	·	1.3 km	MPC · JPL
127573	2003 AT_{30}	—	January 4, 2003	Kitt Peak	Spacewatch	(11882)	2.8 km	MPC · JPL
127574	2003 AG_{34}	—	January 7, 2003	Socorro	LINEAR	·	1.4 km	MPC · JPL
127575	2003 AL_{41}	—	January 7, 2003	Socorro	LINEAR	·	1.7 km	MPC · JPL
127576	2003 AT_{41}	—	January 7, 2003	Socorro	LINEAR	V	1.2 km	MPC · JPL
127577	2003 AF_{44}	—	January 5, 2003	Socorro	LINEAR	·	950 m	MPC · JPL
127578	2003 AA_{53}	—	January 5, 2003	Anderson Mesa	LONEOS	·	2.0 km	MPC · JPL
127579	2003 AJ_{58}	—	January 5, 2003	Socorro	LINEAR	·	7.7 km	MPC · JPL
127580	2003 AD_{59}	—	January 5, 2003	Socorro	LINEAR	·	1.2 km	MPC · JPL
127581	2003 AW_{59}	—	January 5, 2003	Socorro	LINEAR	·	2.3 km	MPC · JPL
127582	2003 AK_{61}	—	January 7, 2003	Socorro	LINEAR	·	1.9 km	MPC · JPL
127583	2003 AG_{64}	—	January 7, 2003	Socorro	LINEAR	MAR	2.3 km	MPC · JPL
127584	2003 AD_{67}	—	January 7, 2003	Socorro	LINEAR	·	10 km	MPC · JPL
127585	2003 AW_{70}	—	January 10, 2003	Socorro	LINEAR	·	1.6 km	MPC · JPL
127586	2003 AY_{79}	—	January 11, 2003	Socorro	LINEAR	H ·	1.5 km	MPC · JPL
127587	2003 AQ_{82}	—	January 8, 2003	Socorro	LINEAR	·	2.0 km	MPC · JPL
127588	2003 AL_{88}	—	January 2, 2003	Socorro	LINEAR	·	1.5 km	MPC · JPL
127589	2003 AS_{91}	—	January 5, 2003	Anderson Mesa	LONEOS	·	5.7 km	MPC · JPL
127590	2003 BY_{1}	—	January 25, 2003	Anderson Mesa	LONEOS	HOF	5.0 km	MPC · JPL
127591	2003 BF_{6}	—	January 23, 2003	Kvistaberg	Uppsala-DLR Asteroid Survey	·	1.1 km	MPC · JPL
127592	2003 BB_{7}	—	January 25, 2003	Anderson Mesa	LONEOS	·	1.9 km	MPC · JPL
127593	2003 BC_{11}	—	January 26, 2003	Anderson Mesa	LONEOS	NYS	2.0 km	MPC · JPL
127594	2003 BL_{12}	—	January 26, 2003	Anderson Mesa	LONEOS	·	5.7 km	MPC · JPL
127595	2003 BN_{12}	—	January 26, 2003	Anderson Mesa	LONEOS	·	1.5 km	MPC · JPL
127596	2003 BA_{15}	—	January 26, 2003	Haleakala	NEAT	·	2.6 km	MPC · JPL
127597	2003 BK_{15}	—	January 26, 2003	Haleakala	NEAT	V	1.2 km	MPC · JPL
127598	2003 BH_{16}	—	January 26, 2003	Haleakala	NEAT	·	1.1 km	MPC · JPL
127599	2003 BE_{18}	—	January 27, 2003	Socorro	LINEAR	·	1.4 km	MPC · JPL
127600	2003 BT_{18}	—	January 27, 2003	Haleakala	NEAT	PHO	3.6 km	MPC · JPL

== 127601–127700 ==
back to top

Designation			Discovery			Properties		Ref
Permanent	Provisional	Named after	Date	Site	Discoverer(s)	Category	Diam.	Ref
127601	2003 BP_{19}	—	January 26, 2003	Haleakala	NEAT	·	2.1 km	MPC · JPL
127602	2003 BY_{19}	—	January 26, 2003	Haleakala	NEAT	·	1.8 km	MPC · JPL
127603	2003 BP_{21}	—	January 27, 2003	Socorro	LINEAR	·	1.5 km	MPC · JPL
127604	2003 BD_{26}	—	January 26, 2003	Anderson Mesa	LONEOS	·	1.8 km	MPC · JPL
127605	2003 BJ_{27}	—	January 26, 2003	Anderson Mesa	LONEOS	(2076)	1.5 km	MPC · JPL
127606	2003 BQ_{28}	—	January 26, 2003	Haleakala	NEAT	·	2.0 km	MPC · JPL
127607	2003 BW_{30}	—	January 27, 2003	Socorro	LINEAR	·	3.0 km	MPC · JPL
127608	2003 BH_{31}	—	January 27, 2003	Socorro	LINEAR	MAR	2.1 km	MPC · JPL
127609	2003 BW_{31}	—	January 27, 2003	Socorro	LINEAR	EUN	2.4 km	MPC · JPL
127610	2003 BK_{34}	—	January 26, 2003	Haleakala	NEAT	·	2.9 km	MPC · JPL
127611	2003 BB_{38}	—	January 27, 2003	Anderson Mesa	LONEOS	V	1.1 km	MPC · JPL
127612	2003 BG_{39}	—	January 27, 2003	Socorro	LINEAR	·	2.0 km	MPC · JPL
127613	2003 BP_{44}	—	January 27, 2003	Socorro	LINEAR	NYS	1.9 km	MPC · JPL
127614	2003 BX_{45}	—	January 30, 2003	Kitt Peak	Spacewatch	·	1.2 km	MPC · JPL
127615	2003 BH_{49}	—	January 26, 2003	Haleakala	NEAT	·	1.7 km	MPC · JPL
127616	2003 BL_{50}	—	January 27, 2003	Socorro	LINEAR	·	4.5 km	MPC · JPL
127617	2003 BM_{53}	—	January 27, 2003	Anderson Mesa	LONEOS	NYS	1.8 km	MPC · JPL
127618	2003 BN_{53}	—	January 27, 2003	Socorro	LINEAR	·	1.3 km	MPC · JPL
127619	2003 BV_{53}	—	January 27, 2003	Socorro	LINEAR	·	2.1 km	MPC · JPL
127620	2003 BY_{54}	—	January 27, 2003	Haleakala	NEAT	·	1.1 km	MPC · JPL
127621	2003 BN_{55}	—	January 27, 2003	Palomar	NEAT	·	1.2 km	MPC · JPL
127622	2003 BM_{62}	—	January 28, 2003	Palomar	NEAT	·	1.8 km	MPC · JPL
127623	2003 BG_{67}	—	January 30, 2003	Haleakala	NEAT	·	1.3 km	MPC · JPL
127624	2003 BP_{70}	—	January 30, 2003	Haleakala	NEAT	·	2.0 km	MPC · JPL
127625	2003 BR_{72}	—	January 28, 2003	Socorro	LINEAR	·	1.6 km	MPC · JPL
127626	2003 BZ_{72}	—	January 28, 2003	Haleakala	NEAT	·	5.4 km	MPC · JPL
127627	2003 BP_{80}	—	January 31, 2003	Socorro	LINEAR	·	2.2 km	MPC · JPL
127628	2003 BT_{81}	—	January 31, 2003	Socorro	LINEAR	·	2.8 km	MPC · JPL
127629	2003 BJ_{89}	—	January 28, 2003	Kitt Peak	Spacewatch	EOS	3.5 km	MPC · JPL
127630	2003 BX_{89}	—	January 28, 2003	Socorro	LINEAR	·	1.8 km	MPC · JPL
127631	2003 BD_{90}	—	January 28, 2003	Socorro	LINEAR	·	2.2 km	MPC · JPL
127632	2003 BK_{90}	—	January 30, 2003	Anderson Mesa	LONEOS	V	970 m	MPC · JPL
127633	2003 CG_{2}	—	February 1, 2003	Socorro	LINEAR	·	6.6 km	MPC · JPL
127634	2003 CY_{4}	—	February 1, 2003	Socorro	LINEAR	·	1.6 km	MPC · JPL
127635	2003 CH_{6}	—	February 1, 2003	Socorro	LINEAR	·	880 m	MPC · JPL
127636	2003 CQ_{7}	—	February 1, 2003	Socorro	LINEAR	·	2.2 km	MPC · JPL
127637	2003 CU_{7}	—	February 1, 2003	Socorro	LINEAR	·	4.9 km	MPC · JPL
127638	2003 CE_{8}	—	February 1, 2003	Socorro	LINEAR	·	1.5 km	MPC · JPL
127639	2003 CO_{8}	—	February 1, 2003	Socorro	LINEAR	PHO	5.2 km	MPC · JPL
127640	2003 CQ_{8}	—	February 1, 2003	Haleakala	NEAT	·	5.8 km	MPC · JPL
127641	2003 CL_{9}	—	February 2, 2003	Socorro	LINEAR	·	1.8 km	MPC · JPL
127642	2003 CO_{9}	—	February 2, 2003	Socorro	LINEAR	·	2.1 km	MPC · JPL
127643	2003 CY_{9}	—	February 2, 2003	Socorro	LINEAR	·	1.2 km	MPC · JPL
127644	2003 CF_{10}	—	February 2, 2003	Socorro	LINEAR	MAR	2.0 km	MPC · JPL
127645	2003 CV_{10}	—	February 3, 2003	Anderson Mesa	LONEOS	V	1.2 km	MPC · JPL
127646	2003 CX_{13}	—	February 5, 2003	Haleakala	NEAT	·	2.0 km	MPC · JPL
127647	2003 CS_{15}	—	February 6, 2003	Socorro	LINEAR	·	2.1 km	MPC · JPL
127648	2003 CA_{18}	—	February 7, 2003	Kitt Peak	Spacewatch	·	1.0 km	MPC · JPL
127649	2003 CS_{19}	—	February 7, 2003	Palomar	NEAT	·	4.0 km	MPC · JPL
127650	2003 DC_{2}	—	February 21, 2003	Palomar	NEAT	EOS	2.7 km	MPC · JPL
127651	2003 DP_{2}	—	February 22, 2003	Desert Eagle	W. K. Y. Yeung	·	1.3 km	MPC · JPL
127652	2003 DT_{3}	—	February 22, 2003	Palomar	NEAT	V	1.1 km	MPC · JPL
127653	2003 DX_{4}	—	February 22, 2003	Palomar	NEAT	NYS	1.9 km	MPC · JPL
127654	2003 DY_{7}	—	February 22, 2003	Kitt Peak	Spacewatch	·	1.5 km	MPC · JPL
127655	2003 DJ_{8}	—	February 22, 2003	Palomar	NEAT	·	3.8 km	MPC · JPL
127656	2003 DV_{8}	—	February 22, 2003	Palomar	NEAT	·	2.3 km	MPC · JPL
127657	2003 DV_{9}	—	February 24, 2003	Uccle	T. Pauwels	·	2.0 km	MPC · JPL
127658 Gapers	2003 DV_{10}	Gapers	February 26, 2003	Campo Imperatore	F. Bernardi	NYS	1.7 km	MPC · JPL
127659	2003 DC_{11}	—	February 23, 2003	Kitt Peak	Spacewatch	NYS	1.5 km	MPC · JPL
127660 Mauroianeselli	2003 DT_{12}	Mauroianeselli	February 26, 2003	Campo Imperatore	F. Bernardi	MAS	1.1 km	MPC · JPL
127661	2003 DM_{13}	—	February 22, 2003	Goodricke-Pigott	Kessel, J. W.	·	1.8 km	MPC · JPL
127662	2003 DT_{13}	—	February 25, 2003	Haleakala	NEAT	PHO	2.6 km	MPC · JPL
127663	2003 DK_{14}	—	February 24, 2003	Haleakala	NEAT	·	2.1 km	MPC · JPL
127664 Denza	2003 DV_{14}	Denza	February 25, 2003	Campo Imperatore	M. Tombelli, F. Bernardi	·	6.1 km	MPC · JPL
127665	2003 DE_{16}	—	February 19, 2003	Palomar	NEAT	·	2.6 km	MPC · JPL
127666	2003 DM_{19}	—	February 22, 2003	Palomar	NEAT	(2076)	1.2 km	MPC · JPL
127667	2003 DH_{20}	—	February 22, 2003	Palomar	NEAT	·	5.8 km	MPC · JPL
127668	2003 DP_{20}	—	February 22, 2003	Palomar	NEAT	·	1.0 km	MPC · JPL
127669	2003 EM_{2}	—	March 5, 2003	Socorro	LINEAR	NYS	2.1 km	MPC · JPL
127670	2003 ER_{2}	—	March 5, 2003	Socorro	LINEAR	·	2.1 km	MPC · JPL
127671	2003 ET_{3}	—	March 6, 2003	Palomar	NEAT	·	5.1 km	MPC · JPL
127672	2003 EF_{4}	—	March 6, 2003	Palomar	NEAT	·	1.5 km	MPC · JPL
127673	2003 EK_{4}	—	March 6, 2003	Desert Eagle	W. K. Y. Yeung	·	1.9 km	MPC · JPL
127674	2003 EX_{4}	—	March 6, 2003	Socorro	LINEAR	·	2.0 km	MPC · JPL
127675	2003 EO_{5}	—	March 5, 2003	Socorro	LINEAR	·	1.3 km	MPC · JPL
127676	2003 EE_{6}	—	March 6, 2003	Anderson Mesa	LONEOS	·	1.4 km	MPC · JPL
127677	2003 EW_{7}	—	March 6, 2003	Anderson Mesa	LONEOS	(2076)	1.3 km	MPC · JPL
127678	2003 ES_{8}	—	March 6, 2003	Anderson Mesa	LONEOS	·	1.7 km	MPC · JPL
127679	2003 EW_{8}	—	March 6, 2003	Socorro	LINEAR	·	1.9 km	MPC · JPL
127680	2003 EX_{10}	—	March 6, 2003	Socorro	LINEAR	·	1.5 km	MPC · JPL
127681	2003 EY_{10}	—	March 6, 2003	Socorro	LINEAR	·	2.2 km	MPC · JPL
127682	2003 EA_{11}	—	March 6, 2003	Socorro	LINEAR	·	4.1 km	MPC · JPL
127683	2003 EW_{12}	—	March 6, 2003	Socorro	LINEAR	PHO	1.6 km	MPC · JPL
127684	2003 EV_{13}	—	March 6, 2003	Palomar	NEAT	·	1.5 km	MPC · JPL
127685	2003 ED_{14}	—	March 7, 2003	Palomar	NEAT	V	1.1 km	MPC · JPL
127686	2003 EM_{14}	—	March 5, 2003	Socorro	LINEAR	MAR	2.5 km	MPC · JPL
127687	2003 EC_{15}	—	March 7, 2003	Socorro	LINEAR	·	2.0 km	MPC · JPL
127688	2003 EC_{16}	—	March 7, 2003	Socorro	LINEAR	·	1.6 km	MPC · JPL
127689 Doncapone	2003 EE_{17}	Doncapone	March 5, 2003	Collepardo	Tagliaferri, U., F. Mallia	·	1.4 km	MPC · JPL
127690	2003 EJ_{17}	—	March 5, 2003	Socorro	LINEAR	·	2.2 km	MPC · JPL
127691	2003 EP_{17}	—	March 5, 2003	Socorro	LINEAR	·	1.4 km	MPC · JPL
127692	2003 EW_{18}	—	March 6, 2003	Anderson Mesa	LONEOS	·	2.0 km	MPC · JPL
127693	2003 EG_{20}	—	March 6, 2003	Anderson Mesa	LONEOS	MAS	1.3 km	MPC · JPL
127694	2003 EN_{20}	—	March 6, 2003	Anderson Mesa	LONEOS	·	1.4 km	MPC · JPL
127695	2003 EO_{21}	—	March 6, 2003	Anderson Mesa	LONEOS	·	1.6 km	MPC · JPL
127696	2003 EQ_{22}	—	March 6, 2003	Socorro	LINEAR	V	1.3 km	MPC · JPL
127697	2003 EU_{22}	—	March 6, 2003	Socorro	LINEAR	·	1.2 km	MPC · JPL
127698	2003 EC_{23}	—	March 6, 2003	Socorro	LINEAR	·	2.7 km	MPC · JPL
127699	2003 EC_{24}	—	March 6, 2003	Socorro	LINEAR	NYS	2.4 km	MPC · JPL
127700	2003 EE_{24}	—	March 6, 2003	Socorro	LINEAR	·	2.9 km	MPC · JPL

== 127701–127800 ==
back to top

Designation			Discovery			Properties		Ref
Permanent	Provisional	Named after	Date	Site	Discoverer(s)	Category	Diam.	Ref
127701	2003 EJ_{24}	—	March 6, 2003	Socorro	LINEAR	·	1.5 km	MPC · JPL
127702	2003 ES_{24}	—	March 6, 2003	Socorro	LINEAR	·	4.2 km	MPC · JPL
127703	2003 EE_{25}	—	March 6, 2003	Anderson Mesa	LONEOS	·	1.0 km	MPC · JPL
127704	2003 EZ_{25}	—	March 6, 2003	Anderson Mesa	LONEOS	·	2.9 km	MPC · JPL
127705	2003 ES_{27}	—	March 6, 2003	Socorro	LINEAR	·	3.2 km	MPC · JPL
127706	2003 EE_{28}	—	March 6, 2003	Socorro	LINEAR	·	1.5 km	MPC · JPL
127707	2003 EN_{28}	—	March 6, 2003	Socorro	LINEAR	·	1.4 km	MPC · JPL
127708	2003 ES_{29}	—	March 6, 2003	Socorro	LINEAR	·	1.6 km	MPC · JPL
127709	2003 ET_{29}	—	March 6, 2003	Socorro	LINEAR	NYS	2.3 km	MPC · JPL
127710	2003 EZ_{31}	—	March 7, 2003	Socorro	LINEAR	·	2.3 km	MPC · JPL
127711	2003 EU_{32}	—	March 7, 2003	Anderson Mesa	LONEOS	·	1.9 km	MPC · JPL
127712	2003 EN_{33}	—	March 7, 2003	Anderson Mesa	LONEOS	·	1.9 km	MPC · JPL
127713	2003 EU_{33}	—	March 7, 2003	Anderson Mesa	LONEOS	·	880 m	MPC · JPL
127714	2003 EF_{35}	—	March 7, 2003	Socorro	LINEAR	·	2.0 km	MPC · JPL
127715	2003 EN_{35}	—	March 7, 2003	Socorro	LINEAR	·	1.5 km	MPC · JPL
127716	2003 ES_{37}	—	March 8, 2003	Anderson Mesa	LONEOS	·	2.7 km	MPC · JPL
127717	2003 EA_{38}	—	March 8, 2003	Anderson Mesa	LONEOS	·	4.3 km	MPC · JPL
127718	2003 EP_{38}	—	March 8, 2003	Anderson Mesa	LONEOS	·	3.3 km	MPC · JPL
127719	2003 EK_{40}	—	March 8, 2003	Socorro	LINEAR	PHO	2.5 km	MPC · JPL
127720	2003 ES_{41}	—	March 6, 2003	Socorro	LINEAR	·	2.4 km	MPC · JPL
127721	2003 EV_{41}	—	March 7, 2003	Anderson Mesa	LONEOS	·	940 m	MPC · JPL
127722	2003 EV_{43}	—	March 6, 2003	Socorro	LINEAR	THM	6.1 km	MPC · JPL
127723	2003 EL_{45}	—	March 7, 2003	Socorro	LINEAR	·	2.0 km	MPC · JPL
127724	2003 ER_{45}	—	March 7, 2003	Socorro	LINEAR	·	2.1 km	MPC · JPL
127725	2003 EE_{48}	—	March 9, 2003	Anderson Mesa	LONEOS	·	2.0 km	MPC · JPL
127726	2003 EB_{49}	—	March 9, 2003	Socorro	LINEAR	V	990 m	MPC · JPL
127727	2003 EE_{49}	—	March 10, 2003	Anderson Mesa	LONEOS	·	1.9 km	MPC · JPL
127728	2003 EU_{49}	—	March 10, 2003	Palomar	NEAT	·	2.1 km	MPC · JPL
127729	2003 EO_{50}	—	March 9, 2003	Socorro	LINEAR	·	3.6 km	MPC · JPL
127730	2003 EF_{52}	—	March 11, 2003	Palomar	NEAT	·	5.0 km	MPC · JPL
127731	2003 ER_{52}	—	March 8, 2003	Socorro	LINEAR	·	1.4 km	MPC · JPL
127732	2003 EW_{57}	—	March 9, 2003	Socorro	LINEAR	·	4.3 km	MPC · JPL
127733	2003 EB_{58}	—	March 9, 2003	Socorro	LINEAR	PHO	1.9 km	MPC · JPL
127734	2003 EP_{59}	—	March 11, 2003	Socorro	LINEAR	·	1.9 km	MPC · JPL
127735	2003 FU	—	March 20, 2003	Palomar	NEAT	PHO	2.0 km	MPC · JPL
127736	2003 FN_{2}	—	March 23, 2003	Farpoint	G. Hug	·	3.1 km	MPC · JPL
127737 Ferretti	2003 FZ_{5}	Ferretti	March 26, 2003	Campo Imperatore	F. Bernardi	·	2.2 km	MPC · JPL
127738	2003 FH_{8}	—	March 21, 2003	Bergisch Gladbach	W. Bickel	·	5.0 km	MPC · JPL
127739	2003 FW_{8}	—	March 28, 2003	Needville	Casady, L., Garossino, P.	·	980 m	MPC · JPL
127740	2003 FS_{9}	—	March 22, 2003	Palomar	NEAT	EUN	2.5 km	MPC · JPL
127741	2003 FG_{11}	—	March 23, 2003	Kitt Peak	Spacewatch	AGN	2.0 km	MPC · JPL
127742	2003 FC_{12}	—	March 24, 2003	Kitt Peak	Spacewatch	·	6.1 km	MPC · JPL
127743	2003 FH_{12}	—	March 22, 2003	Palomar	NEAT	·	3.8 km	MPC · JPL
127744	2003 FN_{12}	—	March 22, 2003	Palomar	NEAT	·	2.3 km	MPC · JPL
127745	2003 FV_{13}	—	March 23, 2003	Kitt Peak	Spacewatch	·	1.7 km	MPC · JPL
127746	2003 FG_{14}	—	March 23, 2003	Kitt Peak	Spacewatch	AGN	2.2 km	MPC · JPL
127747	2003 FR_{14}	—	March 23, 2003	Kitt Peak	Spacewatch	·	1.4 km	MPC · JPL
127748	2003 FN_{16}	—	March 23, 2003	Kitt Peak	Spacewatch	·	1.2 km	MPC · JPL
127749	2003 FS_{16}	—	March 23, 2003	Haleakala	NEAT	·	3.5 km	MPC · JPL
127750	2003 FV_{16}	—	March 23, 2003	Kvistaberg	Uppsala-DLR Asteroid Survey	·	1.8 km	MPC · JPL
127751	2003 FV_{20}	—	March 23, 2003	Palomar	NEAT	·	1.5 km	MPC · JPL
127752	2003 FZ_{20}	—	March 23, 2003	Palomar	NEAT	·	4.2 km	MPC · JPL
127753	2003 FB_{21}	—	March 23, 2003	Palomar	NEAT	·	1.4 km	MPC · JPL
127754	2003 FB_{24}	—	March 23, 2003	Kitt Peak	Spacewatch	MAS	1.0 km	MPC · JPL
127755	2003 FD_{28}	—	March 24, 2003	Kitt Peak	Spacewatch	·	2.2 km	MPC · JPL
127756	2003 FJ_{28}	—	March 24, 2003	Haleakala	NEAT	V	1.1 km	MPC · JPL
127757	2003 FM_{28}	—	March 24, 2003	Haleakala	NEAT	·	5.5 km	MPC · JPL
127758	2003 FO_{30}	—	March 25, 2003	Haleakala	NEAT	ERI	2.5 km	MPC · JPL
127759	2003 FV_{31}	—	March 23, 2003	Kitt Peak	Spacewatch	MAS	1.3 km	MPC · JPL
127760	2003 FM_{32}	—	March 23, 2003	Kitt Peak	Spacewatch	·	2.7 km	MPC · JPL
127761	2003 FL_{34}	—	March 23, 2003	Kitt Peak	Spacewatch	MAS	920 m	MPC · JPL
127762	2003 FC_{38}	—	March 23, 2003	Kitt Peak	Spacewatch	·	1.4 km	MPC · JPL
127763	2003 FO_{38}	—	March 23, 2003	Kitt Peak	Spacewatch	NYS	2.4 km	MPC · JPL
127764	2003 FW_{39}	—	March 24, 2003	Kitt Peak	Spacewatch	·	2.9 km	MPC · JPL
127765	2003 FL_{40}	—	March 24, 2003	Kitt Peak	Spacewatch	NYS	3.2 km	MPC · JPL
127766	2003 FA_{42}	—	March 26, 2003	Kitt Peak	Spacewatch	·	1.1 km	MPC · JPL
127767	2003 FS_{42}	—	March 23, 2003	Kitt Peak	Spacewatch	·	1.4 km	MPC · JPL
127768	2003 FS_{44}	—	March 23, 2003	Haleakala	NEAT	·	1.5 km	MPC · JPL
127769	2003 FB_{47}	—	March 24, 2003	Kitt Peak	Spacewatch	·	3.0 km	MPC · JPL
127770	2003 FR_{47}	—	March 24, 2003	Kitt Peak	Spacewatch	·	2.3 km	MPC · JPL
127771	2003 FP_{50}	—	March 25, 2003	Palomar	NEAT	·	4.7 km	MPC · JPL
127772	2003 FO_{52}	—	March 25, 2003	Palomar	NEAT	·	2.0 km	MPC · JPL
127773	2003 FV_{52}	—	March 25, 2003	Palomar	NEAT	·	11 km	MPC · JPL
127774	2003 FA_{53}	—	March 25, 2003	Haleakala	NEAT	·	1.9 km	MPC · JPL
127775	2003 FH_{53}	—	March 25, 2003	Palomar	NEAT	·	2.2 km	MPC · JPL
127776	2003 FP_{53}	—	March 25, 2003	Palomar	NEAT	·	2.9 km	MPC · JPL
127777	2003 FT_{53}	—	March 25, 2003	Palomar	NEAT	MAR	1.9 km	MPC · JPL
127778	2003 FY_{53}	—	March 25, 2003	Palomar	NEAT	·	4.1 km	MPC · JPL
127779	2003 FN_{54}	—	March 25, 2003	Haleakala	NEAT	·	1.9 km	MPC · JPL
127780	2003 FU_{54}	—	March 25, 2003	Haleakala	NEAT	·	3.2 km	MPC · JPL
127781	2003 FO_{55}	—	March 26, 2003	Palomar	NEAT	·	3.0 km	MPC · JPL
127782	2003 FR_{57}	—	March 26, 2003	Palomar	NEAT	·	3.0 km	MPC · JPL
127783	2003 FL_{60}	—	March 26, 2003	Palomar	NEAT	PAD	2.9 km	MPC · JPL
127784	2003 FD_{63}	—	March 26, 2003	Palomar	NEAT	NYS	1.4 km	MPC · JPL
127785	2003 FE_{63}	—	March 26, 2003	Palomar	NEAT	·	2.6 km	MPC · JPL
127786	2003 FM_{63}	—	March 26, 2003	Palomar	NEAT	NYS	1.8 km	MPC · JPL
127787	2003 FF_{66}	—	March 26, 2003	Palomar	NEAT	·	1.3 km	MPC · JPL
127788	2003 FL_{66}	—	March 26, 2003	Palomar	NEAT	NYS	3.3 km	MPC · JPL
127789	2003 FR_{66}	—	March 26, 2003	Palomar	NEAT	·	1.4 km	MPC · JPL
127790	2003 FC_{72}	—	March 26, 2003	Palomar	NEAT	·	1.9 km	MPC · JPL
127791	2003 FP_{72}	—	March 26, 2003	Palomar	NEAT	·	5.5 km	MPC · JPL
127792	2003 FS_{72}	—	March 26, 2003	Palomar	NEAT	·	1.1 km	MPC · JPL
127793	2003 FZ_{72}	—	March 26, 2003	Haleakala	NEAT	·	1.9 km	MPC · JPL
127794	2003 FA_{73}	—	March 26, 2003	Haleakala	NEAT	·	1.3 km	MPC · JPL
127795	2003 FU_{73}	—	March 26, 2003	Palomar	NEAT	·	2.7 km	MPC · JPL
127796	2003 FO_{74}	—	March 26, 2003	Palomar	NEAT	·	1.7 km	MPC · JPL
127797	2003 FB_{75}	—	March 26, 2003	Haleakala	NEAT	·	3.9 km	MPC · JPL
127798	2003 FQ_{75}	—	March 27, 2003	Palomar	NEAT	·	1.2 km	MPC · JPL
127799	2003 FB_{76}	—	March 27, 2003	Palomar	NEAT	·	1.3 km	MPC · JPL
127800	2003 FL_{76}	—	March 27, 2003	Palomar	NEAT	·	1.6 km	MPC · JPL

== 127801–127900 ==
back to top

Designation			Discovery			Properties		Ref
Permanent	Provisional	Named after	Date	Site	Discoverer(s)	Category	Diam.	Ref
127801	2003 FL_{77}	—	March 27, 2003	Palomar	NEAT	·	2.2 km	MPC · JPL
127802	2003 FM_{77}	—	March 27, 2003	Palomar	NEAT	·	1.2 km	MPC · JPL
127803 Johnvaneepoel	2003 FP_{77}	Johnvaneepoel	March 27, 2003	Catalina	CSS	MAR	1.7 km	MPC · JPL
127804	2003 FH_{80}	—	March 27, 2003	Socorro	LINEAR	·	1.5 km	MPC · JPL
127805	2003 FE_{81}	—	March 27, 2003	Socorro	LINEAR	·	4.5 km	MPC · JPL
127806	2003 FO_{81}	—	March 27, 2003	Socorro	LINEAR	·	6.1 km	MPC · JPL
127807	2003 FK_{82}	—	March 27, 2003	Palomar	NEAT	·	3.8 km	MPC · JPL
127808	2003 FU_{82}	—	March 27, 2003	Palomar	NEAT	·	1.9 km	MPC · JPL
127809	2003 FQ_{83}	—	March 27, 2003	Palomar	NEAT	·	1.9 km	MPC · JPL
127810 Michaelwright	2003 FK_{85}	Michaelwright	March 28, 2003	Catalina	CSS	·	2.1 km	MPC · JPL
127811	2003 FS_{85}	—	March 28, 2003	Anderson Mesa	LONEOS	·	2.1 km	MPC · JPL
127812	2003 FT_{85}	—	March 28, 2003	Anderson Mesa	LONEOS	SUL	4.1 km	MPC · JPL
127813	2003 FG_{86}	—	March 28, 2003	Kitt Peak	Spacewatch	·	1.3 km	MPC · JPL
127814	2003 FT_{86}	—	March 28, 2003	Kitt Peak	Spacewatch	·	5.0 km	MPC · JPL
127815	2003 FG_{87}	—	March 28, 2003	Kitt Peak	Spacewatch	·	1.8 km	MPC · JPL
127816	2003 FH_{88}	—	March 28, 2003	Kitt Peak	Spacewatch	·	2.3 km	MPC · JPL
127817	2003 FK_{88}	—	March 28, 2003	Kitt Peak	Spacewatch	·	3.1 km	MPC · JPL
127818	2003 FL_{88}	—	March 28, 2003	Kitt Peak	Spacewatch	·	1.5 km	MPC · JPL
127819	2003 FZ_{88}	—	March 29, 2003	Anderson Mesa	LONEOS	·	1.2 km	MPC · JPL
127820	2003 FV_{90}	—	March 29, 2003	Anderson Mesa	LONEOS	·	1.4 km	MPC · JPL
127821	2003 FE_{91}	—	March 29, 2003	Anderson Mesa	LONEOS	·	1.3 km	MPC · JPL
127822	2003 FV_{91}	—	March 29, 2003	Anderson Mesa	LONEOS	·	3.6 km	MPC · JPL
127823	2003 FD_{92}	—	March 29, 2003	Anderson Mesa	LONEOS	·	2.5 km	MPC · JPL
127824	2003 FK_{92}	—	March 29, 2003	Anderson Mesa	LONEOS	·	1.8 km	MPC · JPL
127825	2003 FR_{92}	—	March 29, 2003	Anderson Mesa	LONEOS	TIR	3.5 km	MPC · JPL
127826	2003 FY_{92}	—	March 29, 2003	Anderson Mesa	LONEOS	·	2.0 km	MPC · JPL
127827	2003 FB_{93}	—	March 29, 2003	Anderson Mesa	LONEOS	·	1.4 km	MPC · JPL
127828	2003 FH_{93}	—	March 29, 2003	Anderson Mesa	LONEOS	·	2.3 km	MPC · JPL
127829	2003 FH_{94}	—	March 29, 2003	Anderson Mesa	LONEOS	HNS	2.1 km	MPC · JPL
127830	2003 FP_{94}	—	March 29, 2003	Anderson Mesa	LONEOS	·	2.5 km	MPC · JPL
127831	2003 FQ_{94}	—	March 29, 2003	Anderson Mesa	LONEOS	V	1.3 km	MPC · JPL
127832	2003 FS_{101}	—	March 31, 2003	Kitt Peak	Spacewatch	·	1.1 km	MPC · JPL
127833	2003 FU_{103}	—	March 24, 2003	Kitt Peak	Spacewatch	·	1.3 km	MPC · JPL
127834	2003 FR_{104}	—	March 25, 2003	Haleakala	NEAT	·	1.4 km	MPC · JPL
127835	2003 FX_{104}	—	March 26, 2003	Kitt Peak	Spacewatch	NYS · fast	2.1 km	MPC · JPL
127836	2003 FW_{106}	—	March 27, 2003	Anderson Mesa	LONEOS	V	1.4 km	MPC · JPL
127837	2003 FP_{107}	—	March 30, 2003	Socorro	LINEAR	·	1.6 km	MPC · JPL
127838	2003 FU_{107}	—	March 30, 2003	Socorro	LINEAR	·	4.3 km	MPC · JPL
127839	2003 FV_{107}	—	March 31, 2003	Socorro	LINEAR	·	1.1 km	MPC · JPL
127840	2003 FL_{108}	—	March 30, 2003	Socorro	LINEAR	·	3.1 km	MPC · JPL
127841	2003 FN_{108}	—	March 31, 2003	Anderson Mesa	LONEOS	·	3.4 km	MPC · JPL
127842	2003 FC_{109}	—	March 31, 2003	Anderson Mesa	LONEOS	·	1.3 km	MPC · JPL
127843	2003 FG_{109}	—	March 31, 2003	Anderson Mesa	LONEOS	·	2.4 km	MPC · JPL
127844	2003 FL_{109}	—	March 31, 2003	Anderson Mesa	LONEOS	·	3.5 km	MPC · JPL
127845	2003 FY_{109}	—	March 30, 2003	Anderson Mesa	LONEOS	·	3.9 km	MPC · JPL
127846	2003 FO_{111}	—	March 31, 2003	Anderson Mesa	LONEOS	L4	20 km	MPC · JPL
127847	2003 FT_{111}	—	March 31, 2003	Socorro	LINEAR	·	1.1 km	MPC · JPL
127848	2003 FW_{111}	—	March 31, 2003	Socorro	LINEAR	·	3.5 km	MPC · JPL
127849	2003 FY_{111}	—	March 31, 2003	Socorro	LINEAR	·	1.4 km	MPC · JPL
127850	2003 FC_{112}	—	March 31, 2003	Socorro	LINEAR	·	1.0 km	MPC · JPL
127851	2003 FW_{112}	—	March 30, 2003	Socorro	LINEAR	NYS	2.2 km	MPC · JPL
127852	2003 FA_{113}	—	March 30, 2003	Kitt Peak	Spacewatch	NYS	1.8 km	MPC · JPL
127853	2003 FB_{113}	—	March 30, 2003	Kitt Peak	Spacewatch	·	3.9 km	MPC · JPL
127854	2003 FH_{113}	—	March 31, 2003	Socorro	LINEAR	NYS	1.9 km	MPC · JPL
127855	2003 FQ_{114}	—	March 31, 2003	Kitt Peak	Spacewatch	·	1.8 km	MPC · JPL
127856	2003 FR_{114}	—	March 31, 2003	Kitt Peak	Spacewatch	·	1.4 km	MPC · JPL
127857	2003 FZ_{114}	—	March 31, 2003	Socorro	LINEAR	·	1.3 km	MPC · JPL
127858	2003 FJ_{115}	—	March 31, 2003	Kitt Peak	Spacewatch	·	6.0 km	MPC · JPL
127859	2003 FP_{115}	—	March 31, 2003	Socorro	LINEAR	·	1.9 km	MPC · JPL
127860	2003 FS_{115}	—	March 31, 2003	Socorro	LINEAR	·	2.7 km	MPC · JPL
127861	2003 FE_{116}	—	March 22, 2003	Palomar	NEAT	·	2.0 km	MPC · JPL
127862	2003 FT_{116}	—	March 23, 2003	Kitt Peak	Spacewatch	·	1.1 km	MPC · JPL
127863	2003 FE_{118}	—	March 25, 2003	Palomar	NEAT	·	1.7 km	MPC · JPL
127864	2003 FM_{118}	—	March 26, 2003	Anderson Mesa	LONEOS	·	2.8 km	MPC · JPL
127865	2003 FK_{119}	—	March 26, 2003	Anderson Mesa	LONEOS	MAS	1.2 km	MPC · JPL
127866	2003 FR_{119}	—	March 26, 2003	Anderson Mesa	LONEOS	·	2.2 km	MPC · JPL
127867	2003 FS_{119}	—	March 26, 2003	Anderson Mesa	LONEOS	MAS	1.2 km	MPC · JPL
127868	2003 FT_{119}	—	March 26, 2003	Anderson Mesa	LONEOS	NYS	1.8 km	MPC · JPL
127869	2003 FW_{121}	—	March 25, 2003	Anderson Mesa	LONEOS	EUN	2.5 km	MPC · JPL
127870 Vigo	2003 FE_{123}	Vigo	March 24, 2003	Mérida	Ferrin, I. R., Leal, C.	·	4.9 km	MPC · JPL
127871	2003 FC_{128}	—	March 31, 2003	Kitt Peak	M. W. Buie	res · 4:5	123 km	MPC · JPL
127872	2003 GV	—	April 4, 2003	Socorro	LINEAR	·	1.5 km	MPC · JPL
127873	2003 GN_{1}	—	April 1, 2003	Haleakala	NEAT	V	1.5 km	MPC · JPL
127874	2003 GP_{1}	—	April 1, 2003	Haleakala	NEAT	·	2.0 km	MPC · JPL
127875	2003 GT_{1}	—	April 1, 2003	Haleakala	NEAT	·	3.0 km	MPC · JPL
127876	2003 GN_{2}	—	April 1, 2003	Socorro	LINEAR	(5)	2.0 km	MPC · JPL
127877	2003 GP_{3}	—	April 1, 2003	Socorro	LINEAR	·	1.8 km	MPC · JPL
127878	2003 GH_{4}	—	April 1, 2003	Socorro	LINEAR	·	2.4 km	MPC · JPL
127879	2003 GL_{4}	—	April 1, 2003	Socorro	LINEAR	·	2.3 km	MPC · JPL
127880	2003 GS_{4}	—	April 1, 2003	Socorro	LINEAR	·	1.2 km	MPC · JPL
127881	2003 GG_{5}	—	April 1, 2003	Socorro	LINEAR	NYS ·	2.9 km	MPC · JPL
127882	2003 GX_{5}	—	April 1, 2003	Socorro	LINEAR	·	1.4 km	MPC · JPL
127883	2003 GB_{6}	—	April 1, 2003	Socorro	LINEAR	(2076)	2.0 km	MPC · JPL
127884	2003 GK_{6}	—	April 2, 2003	Socorro	LINEAR	·	2.2 km	MPC · JPL
127885	2003 GL_{6}	—	April 2, 2003	Socorro	LINEAR	·	1.5 km	MPC · JPL
127886	2003 GO_{6}	—	April 2, 2003	Socorro	LINEAR	·	2.4 km	MPC · JPL
127887	2003 GT_{6}	—	April 2, 2003	Haleakala	NEAT	·	3.2 km	MPC · JPL
127888	2003 GO_{7}	—	April 1, 2003	Socorro	LINEAR	·	1.3 km	MPC · JPL
127889	2003 GT_{8}	—	April 1, 2003	Socorro	LINEAR	·	2.1 km	MPC · JPL
127890	2003 GE_{9}	—	April 2, 2003	Socorro	LINEAR	(2076)	1.9 km	MPC · JPL
127891	2003 GG_{9}	—	April 2, 2003	Socorro	LINEAR	·	1.3 km	MPC · JPL
127892	2003 GO_{9}	—	April 2, 2003	Socorro	LINEAR	·	3.8 km	MPC · JPL
127893	2003 GU_{9}	—	April 2, 2003	Socorro	LINEAR	·	4.3 km	MPC · JPL
127894	2003 GD_{12}	—	April 1, 2003	Socorro	LINEAR	·	2.1 km	MPC · JPL
127895	2003 GA_{13}	—	April 1, 2003	Socorro	LINEAR	·	1.7 km	MPC · JPL
127896	2003 GY_{14}	—	April 3, 2003	Haleakala	NEAT	MAR	1.8 km	MPC · JPL
127897	2003 GJ_{15}	—	April 4, 2003	Haleakala	NEAT	·	4.6 km	MPC · JPL
127898	2003 GA_{16}	—	April 2, 2003	Socorro	LINEAR	·	1.8 km	MPC · JPL
127899	2003 GG_{16}	—	April 2, 2003	Haleakala	NEAT	·	4.4 km	MPC · JPL
127900	2003 GO_{16}	—	April 3, 2003	Haleakala	NEAT	·	3.0 km	MPC · JPL

== 127901–128000 ==
back to top

Designation			Discovery			Properties		Ref
Permanent	Provisional	Named after	Date	Site	Discoverer(s)	Category	Diam.	Ref
127901	2003 GD_{22}	—	April 6, 2003	Desert Eagle	W. K. Y. Yeung	·	1.9 km	MPC · JPL
127902	2003 GG_{22}	—	April 6, 2003	Desert Eagle	W. K. Y. Yeung	·	2.4 km	MPC · JPL
127903	2003 GT_{22}	—	April 3, 2003	Anderson Mesa	LONEOS	·	1.7 km	MPC · JPL
127904	2003 GB_{23}	—	April 3, 2003	Anderson Mesa	LONEOS	·	2.5 km	MPC · JPL
127905	2003 GE_{23}	—	April 4, 2003	Anderson Mesa	LONEOS	·	3.7 km	MPC · JPL
127906	2003 GV_{23}	—	April 6, 2003	Socorro	LINEAR	PHO	3.1 km	MPC · JPL
127907	2003 GW_{23}	—	April 6, 2003	Kitt Peak	Spacewatch	·	1.3 km	MPC · JPL
127908	2003 GM_{26}	—	April 4, 2003	Kitt Peak	Spacewatch	·	3.1 km	MPC · JPL
127909	2003 GU_{26}	—	April 4, 2003	Kitt Peak	Spacewatch	·	690 m	MPC · JPL
127910	2003 GV_{26}	—	April 4, 2003	Kitt Peak	Spacewatch	·	4.8 km	MPC · JPL
127911	2003 GG_{27}	—	April 6, 2003	Kitt Peak	Spacewatch	·	3.2 km	MPC · JPL
127912	2003 GY_{28}	—	April 4, 2003	Kitt Peak	Spacewatch	·	1.3 km	MPC · JPL
127913	2003 GD_{29}	—	April 5, 2003	Kitt Peak	Spacewatch	V	1.7 km	MPC · JPL
127914	2003 GK_{29}	—	April 7, 2003	Socorro	LINEAR	·	1.5 km	MPC · JPL
127915	2003 GB_{35}	—	April 8, 2003	Socorro	LINEAR	·	2.6 km	MPC · JPL
127916	2003 GC_{38}	—	April 8, 2003	Socorro	LINEAR	·	3.7 km	MPC · JPL
127917	2003 GW_{38}	—	April 8, 2003	Kitt Peak	Spacewatch	·	3.6 km	MPC · JPL
127918	2003 GB_{40}	—	April 8, 2003	Socorro	LINEAR	·	2.4 km	MPC · JPL
127919	2003 GR_{43}	—	April 9, 2003	Socorro	LINEAR	V	1.3 km	MPC · JPL
127920	2003 GH_{44}	—	April 9, 2003	Socorro	LINEAR	TIR	6.3 km	MPC · JPL
127921	2003 GL_{44}	—	April 9, 2003	Socorro	LINEAR	·	7.1 km	MPC · JPL
127922	2003 GM_{44}	—	April 9, 2003	Palomar	NEAT	·	9.6 km	MPC · JPL
127923	2003 GP_{46}	—	April 8, 2003	Palomar	NEAT	·	1.8 km	MPC · JPL
127924	2003 GO_{47}	—	April 7, 2003	Kitt Peak	Spacewatch	·	970 m	MPC · JPL
127925	2003 GQ_{47}	—	April 7, 2003	Palomar	NEAT	·	2.6 km	MPC · JPL
127926	2003 GO_{48}	—	April 9, 2003	Palomar	NEAT	·	2.5 km	MPC · JPL
127927	2003 GU_{49}	—	April 10, 2003	Kitt Peak	Spacewatch	·	1.8 km	MPC · JPL
127928	2003 GW_{49}	—	April 10, 2003	Kitt Peak	Spacewatch	·	3.2 km	MPC · JPL
127929	2003 GL_{53}	—	April 9, 2003	Kingsnake	J. V. McClusky	PHO	1.9 km	MPC · JPL
127930	2003 GX_{53}	—	April 5, 2003	Anderson Mesa	LONEOS	·	3.1 km	MPC · JPL
127931	2003 GA_{55}	—	April 4, 2003	Kitt Peak	Spacewatch	·	1.8 km	MPC · JPL
127932	2003 HB_{1}	—	April 21, 2003	Catalina	CSS	·	3.1 km	MPC · JPL
127933 Shaunoborn	2003 HF_{1}	Shaunoborn	April 21, 2003	Catalina	CSS	·	1.4 km	MPC · JPL
127934	2003 HK_{1}	—	April 22, 2003	Siding Spring	R. H. McNaught	·	2.0 km	MPC · JPL
127935 Reedmckenna	2003 HM_{1}	Reedmckenna	April 21, 2003	Catalina	CSS	(5)	2.5 km	MPC · JPL
127936 Maia	2003 HU_{1}	Maia	April 23, 2003	Campo Imperatore	CINEOS	·	2.4 km	MPC · JPL
127937	2003 HZ_{1}	—	April 23, 2003	Reedy Creek	J. Broughton	EOS	3.6 km	MPC · JPL
127938	2003 HN_{2}	—	April 25, 2003	Socorro	LINEAR	·	1.4 km	MPC · JPL
127939	2003 HX_{2}	—	April 24, 2003	Anderson Mesa	LONEOS	·	1.7 km	MPC · JPL
127940	2003 HE_{3}	—	April 24, 2003	Anderson Mesa	LONEOS	EOS	3.3 km	MPC · JPL
127941	2003 HK_{3}	—	April 24, 2003	Anderson Mesa	LONEOS	·	2.7 km	MPC · JPL
127942	2003 HR_{3}	—	April 24, 2003	Anderson Mesa	LONEOS	·	990 m	MPC · JPL
127943	2003 HW_{3}	—	April 24, 2003	Anderson Mesa	LONEOS	·	1.0 km	MPC · JPL
127944	2003 HN_{4}	—	April 24, 2003	Anderson Mesa	LONEOS	·	4.9 km	MPC · JPL
127945	2003 HW_{6}	—	April 24, 2003	Kitt Peak	Spacewatch	·	2.6 km	MPC · JPL
127946	2003 HD_{8}	—	April 24, 2003	Anderson Mesa	LONEOS	·	1.4 km	MPC · JPL
127947	2003 HE_{8}	—	April 24, 2003	Anderson Mesa	LONEOS	·	2.4 km	MPC · JPL
127948	2003 HU_{9}	—	April 25, 2003	Kitt Peak	Spacewatch	·	2.4 km	MPC · JPL
127949	2003 HA_{10}	—	April 25, 2003	Kitt Peak	Spacewatch	·	4.0 km	MPC · JPL
127950	2003 HK_{10}	—	April 25, 2003	Kitt Peak	Spacewatch	·	3.9 km	MPC · JPL
127951	2003 HQ_{10}	—	April 25, 2003	Kitt Peak	Spacewatch	·	6.2 km	MPC · JPL
127952	2003 HD_{11}	—	April 26, 2003	Kitt Peak	Spacewatch	·	4.4 km	MPC · JPL
127953	2003 HA_{13}	—	April 24, 2003	Kitt Peak	Spacewatch	·	3.3 km	MPC · JPL
127954	2003 HB_{13}	—	April 24, 2003	Kitt Peak	Spacewatch	·	1.4 km	MPC · JPL
127955 Alexandraradu	2003 HY_{13}	Alexandraradu	April 25, 2003	Campo Imperatore	CINEOS	·	2.2 km	MPC · JPL
127956	2003 HR_{14}	—	April 26, 2003	Haleakala	NEAT	·	1.9 km	MPC · JPL
127957	2003 HF_{15}	—	April 26, 2003	Haleakala	NEAT	·	2.2 km	MPC · JPL
127958	2003 HD_{16}	—	April 25, 2003	Campo Imperatore	CINEOS	·	2.2 km	MPC · JPL
127959	2003 HD_{20}	—	April 26, 2003	Haleakala	NEAT	NYS	1.7 km	MPC · JPL
127960	2003 HP_{20}	—	April 24, 2003	Anderson Mesa	LONEOS	V	1.1 km	MPC · JPL
127961	2003 HA_{21}	—	April 24, 2003	Anderson Mesa	LONEOS	·	1.8 km	MPC · JPL
127962	2003 HG_{21}	—	April 25, 2003	Kitt Peak	Spacewatch	·	3.1 km	MPC · JPL
127963	2003 HO_{21}	—	April 26, 2003	Haleakala	NEAT	·	5.6 km	MPC · JPL
127964	2003 HQ_{21}	—	April 26, 2003	Haleakala	NEAT	·	2.4 km	MPC · JPL
127965 Ettorecittadini	2003 HG_{22}	Ettorecittadini	April 24, 2003	Campo Imperatore	F. Bernardi, M. Di Martino	·	1.2 km	MPC · JPL
127966	2003 HU_{26}	—	April 27, 2003	Anderson Mesa	LONEOS	ERI	2.3 km	MPC · JPL
127967	2003 HJ_{27}	—	April 28, 2003	Socorro	LINEAR	·	2.0 km	MPC · JPL
127968	2003 HD_{28}	—	April 26, 2003	Haleakala	NEAT	·	2.2 km	MPC · JPL
127969	2003 HO_{31}	—	April 26, 2003	Kitt Peak	Spacewatch	(5)	1.8 km	MPC · JPL
127970	2003 HJ_{36}	—	April 28, 2003	Socorro	LINEAR	·	7.4 km	MPC · JPL
127971	2003 HP_{36}	—	April 29, 2003	Socorro	LINEAR	NYS	2.0 km	MPC · JPL
127972	2003 HP_{37}	—	April 28, 2003	Anderson Mesa	LONEOS	·	1.9 km	MPC · JPL
127973	2003 HO_{38}	—	April 29, 2003	Socorro	LINEAR	NYS	3.1 km	MPC · JPL
127974	2003 HL_{39}	—	April 29, 2003	Socorro	LINEAR	·	1.9 km	MPC · JPL
127975	2003 HM_{39}	—	April 29, 2003	Socorro	LINEAR	·	1.3 km	MPC · JPL
127976	2003 HY_{39}	—	April 29, 2003	Socorro	LINEAR	NYS	1.8 km	MPC · JPL
127977	2003 HF_{40}	—	April 29, 2003	Socorro	LINEAR	NYS	2.4 km	MPC · JPL
127978	2003 HL_{40}	—	April 29, 2003	Socorro	LINEAR	·	3.4 km	MPC · JPL
127979	2003 HM_{40}	—	April 29, 2003	Socorro	LINEAR	·	2.3 km	MPC · JPL
127980	2003 HC_{41}	—	April 29, 2003	Socorro	LINEAR	·	1.5 km	MPC · JPL
127981	2003 HS_{41}	—	April 29, 2003	Haleakala	NEAT	·	6.7 km	MPC · JPL
127982	2003 HY_{41}	—	April 29, 2003	Haleakala	NEAT	EUN	2.4 km	MPC · JPL
127983	2003 HW_{42}	—	April 29, 2003	Reedy Creek	J. Broughton	·	2.3 km	MPC · JPL
127984	2003 HA_{43}	—	April 28, 2003	Haleakala	NEAT	·	2.5 km	MPC · JPL
127985	2003 HM_{43}	—	April 29, 2003	Socorro	LINEAR	·	2.0 km	MPC · JPL
127986	2003 HN_{43}	—	April 29, 2003	Socorro	LINEAR	·	4.8 km	MPC · JPL
127987	2003 HE_{45}	—	April 29, 2003	Socorro	LINEAR	·	5.9 km	MPC · JPL
127988	2003 HJ_{46}	—	April 28, 2003	Socorro	LINEAR	MAS	1.4 km	MPC · JPL
127989	2003 HL_{46}	—	April 28, 2003	Socorro	LINEAR	MAR	1.9 km	MPC · JPL
127990	2003 HG_{48}	—	April 30, 2003	Socorro	LINEAR	·	1.6 km	MPC · JPL
127991	2003 HR_{48}	—	April 30, 2003	Socorro	LINEAR	·	6.7 km	MPC · JPL
127992	2003 HT_{48}	—	April 30, 2003	Socorro	LINEAR	·	1.7 km	MPC · JPL
127993	2003 HU_{48}	—	April 30, 2003	Socorro	LINEAR	·	1.3 km	MPC · JPL
127994	2003 HE_{49}	—	April 30, 2003	Haleakala	NEAT	·	5.0 km	MPC · JPL
127995	2003 HS_{49}	—	April 29, 2003	Anderson Mesa	LONEOS	AGN	1.9 km	MPC · JPL
127996	2003 HJ_{50}	—	April 30, 2003	Kitt Peak	Spacewatch	HNS	2.6 km	MPC · JPL
127997	2003 HQ_{50}	—	April 28, 2003	Socorro	LINEAR	V	1.2 km	MPC · JPL
127998	2003 HA_{51}	—	April 28, 2003	Socorro	LINEAR	·	3.3 km	MPC · JPL
127999	2003 HF_{51}	—	April 29, 2003	Kitt Peak	Spacewatch	V	1.1 km	MPC · JPL
128000	2003 HQ_{51}	—	April 30, 2003	Socorro	LINEAR	·	2.7 km	MPC · JPL

back to top

== See also ==
- Meanings of minor-planet names: 127001–128000
