= Meanings of minor-planet names: 126001–127000 =

As minor planet discoveries are confirmed, they are given a permanent number by the IAU's Minor Planet Center (MPC), and the discoverers can then submit names for them, following the IAU's naming conventions. The list below concerns those minor planets in the specified number-range that have received names, and explains the meanings of those names.

Official naming citations of newly named small Solar System bodies are approved and published in a bulletin by IAU's Working Group for Small Bodies Nomenclature (WGSBN). Before May 2021, citations were published in MPC's Minor Planet Circulars for many decades. Recent citations can also be found on the JPL Small-Body Database (SBDB). Until his death in 2016, German astronomer Lutz D. Schmadel compiled these citations into the Dictionary of Minor Planet Names (DMP) and regularly updated the collection.

Based on Paul Herget's The Names of the Minor Planets, Schmadel also researched the unclear origin of numerous asteroids, most of which had been named prior to World War II. This article incorporates text from this source, which is in the public domain: SBDB New namings may only be added to this list below after official publication as the preannouncement of names is condemned. The WGSBN publishes a comprehensive guideline for the naming rules of non-cometary small Solar System bodies.

== 126001–126100 ==
Named minor planet	Provisional	This minor planet was named for...	Ref · Catalog
There are no named minor planets in this number range

== 126101–126200 ==
back to top

Named minor planet	Provisional	This minor planet was named for...	Ref · Catalog
126160 Fabienkuntz	2002 AF	Fabien Kuntz (born 1983), a French meteorite hunter and popular science writer from Besançon.	JPL · 126160
126161 Piazzano	2002 AK	Piazzano, Italian village, in the province of Florence.	IAU · 126161
126177 Filippofrontera	2002 AP}12	Filippo Frontera (b. 1941), an Italian astrophysicist.	IAU · 126177
126183 Larrymitchell	2002 AS_{18}	Larry Mitchell (b. 1946), an American master visual astronomer.	IAU · 126183

== 126201–126300 ==
back to top

Named minor planet	Provisional	This minor planet was named for...	Ref · Catalog
126245 Kandókálmán	2002 AY_{66}	Kálmán Kandó (1869–1931), Hungarian engineer, one of the creators of the electric railway (the discovery occurred on his 133rd birth anniversary)	JPL · 126245
126246 Losignore	2002 AB_{67}	Italian brothers Giuseppe (b. 1970) and Gianfranco (b. 1972) Losignore did their utmost to collect the fragments of the meteorite that fell on their property in the suburbs of Matera on 2023 February 14.	IAU · 126246
126247 Laurafaggioli	2002 AL_{67}	Laura Faggioli (born 1980), Italian mathematician working at the ESA's Planetary Defence Office.	IAU · 126247
126248 Dariooliviero	2002 AO_{67}	Dario Oliviero (born 1988), Italian aerospace engineer workin at the ESA's Planetary Defence Office.	IAU · 126248
126249 Gabrielgraur	2002 AP_{67}	Gabriel Graur (born 1999), Romanian-Moldovan software engineer at Deimos Space.	IAU · 126249

== 126301–126400 ==
back to top

Named minor planet	Provisional	This minor planet was named for...	Ref · Catalog
126315 Bláthy	2002 AH_{130}	Ottó Bláthy (1860–1939), Hungarian electrical engineer	JPL · 126315

== 126401–126500 ==
back to top

Named minor planet	Provisional	This minor planet was named for...	Ref · Catalog
126444 Wylie	2002 CF_{16}	Wylie Erwin Reeves (1967–2006), American historian and high-school teacher	JPL · 126444
126445 Prestonreeves	2002 CH_{16}	W. Preston Reeves (born 1935), American chemistry professor emeritus at Texas Lutheran University	JPL · 126445

== 126501–126600 ==
back to top

Named minor planet	Provisional	This minor planet was named for...	Ref · Catalog
126578 Suhhosoo	2002 CK_{116}	Ho Soo Suh (1736–1799), Korean scientist responsible for most of the astronomical and arithmetical projects	JPL · 126578

== 126601–126700 ==
back to top

Named minor planet	Provisional	This minor planet was named for...	Ref · Catalog
There are no named minor planets in this number range

== 126701–126800 ==
back to top

Named minor planet	Provisional	This minor planet was named for...	Ref · Catalog
126748 Mariegerbet	2002 DP	Marie Gerbet (born 1989), a French meteorite hunter	JPL · 126748
126749 Johnjones	2002 DQ_{1}	John Jones (1927–2006), American astronomy popularizer, president of the Chicago Astronomical Society and general chairman of Astrofest	JPL · 126749
126780 Ivovasiljev	2002 EP_{7}	Ivo Vasiljev (born 1935) is a Czech linguist, translator, teacher and orientalist dealing with the Korean, Chinese, Japanese and Vietnamese languages.	JPL · 126780

== 126801–126900 ==
back to top

Named minor planet	Provisional	This minor planet was named for...	Ref · Catalog
126888 Tspitzer	2002 EO_{100}	Thomas J. Spitzer (born 1957) was the Electrical Power Systems Engineer on more than a dozen Goddard missions, including the highly successful Lunar Reconnaissance Orbiter that re-mapped the moon, as well as the OSIRIS-REx asteroid sample-return mission.	JPL · 126888

== 126901–127000 ==
back to top

Named minor planet	Provisional	This minor planet was named for...	Ref · Catalog
126901 Craigstevens	2002 EE_{110}	Craig L. Stevens (born 1978) is the Project Verification Systems Engineer for the OSIRIS-REx asteroid sample-return mission. Prior to serving in this role, he participated in the development of flight systems for several NASA missions including JWST, MESSENGER, GPM, New Horizons, LRO, LADEE and Landsat 8.	JPL · 126901
126905 Junetveekrem	2002 EF_{112}	June Tveekrem (born 1960) contributed to the OSIRIS-REx asteroid sample-return mission as an optical engineer. As an expert in optical modeling and analysis, she performed stray light analyses for OVIRS and sun glint analyses for the overall OSIRIS-REx mission.	JPL · 126905
126906 Andykulessa	2002 EX_{114}	Andrew "Andy" S. Kulessa (born 1960) is an Australian scientist who is an expert on tropospheric propagation phenomena, and of micro- and meso-scale meteorological effects on electronic communications. He is an active researcher in astrophysical phenomena, stellar/galactic dynamics, and characteristics of variable stars.	IAU · 126906
126965 Neri	2002 FJ_{18}	Rodolfo Neri Vela (born 1952) is the first Mexican person to travel to space. In 1985, he was a payload specialist on the Space Shuttle Atlantis. During the flight, he conducted experiments, including many on the subject of human physiology.	JPL · 126965

back to top

Preceded by 125,001–126,000	Meanings of minor-planet names List of minor planets: 126,001–127,000	Succeeded by 127,001–128,000
