= List of minor planets: 126001–127000 =

The following is a partial list of minor planets, running from minor-planet number 126001 through 127000, inclusive. The primary data for this and other partial lists is based on JPL's "Small-Body Orbital Elements" and data available from the Minor Planet Center. Critical list information is also provided by the MPC, unless otherwise specified from Lowell Observatory. A detailed description of the table's columns and additional sources are given on the main page including a complete list of every page in this series, and a statistical break-up on the dynamical classification of minor planets.

Also see the summary list of all named bodies in numerical and alphabetical order, and the corresponding naming citations for the number range of this particular list. New namings may only be added to this list after official publication, as the preannouncement of names is condemned by the Working Group for Small Bodies Nomenclature of the International Astronomical Union.

Near-Earth obj.	MBA (inner)	MBA (outer)	Centaur
Mars-crosser	MBA (middle)	Jupiter trojan	Trans-Neptunian obj.
Unclassified

== 126001–126100 ==
Designation			Discovery			Properties		Ref
Permanent	Provisional	Named after	Date	Site	Discoverer(s)	Category	Diam.	Ref
126001	2001 YE_{46}	—	December 18, 2001	Socorro	LINEAR	·	4.8 km	MPC · JPL
126002	2001 YL_{46}	—	December 18, 2001	Socorro	LINEAR	V	1.3 km	MPC · JPL
126003	2001 YY_{46}	—	December 18, 2001	Socorro	LINEAR	·	1.9 km	MPC · JPL
126004	2001 YB_{48}	—	December 18, 2001	Socorro	LINEAR	NYS	1.5 km	MPC · JPL
126005	2001 YT_{49}	—	December 18, 2001	Socorro	LINEAR	NYS	1.7 km	MPC · JPL
126006	2001 YS_{50}	—	December 18, 2001	Socorro	LINEAR	·	2.7 km	MPC · JPL
126007	2001 YM_{51}	—	December 18, 2001	Socorro	LINEAR	NYS	2.6 km	MPC · JPL
126008	2001 YN_{51}	—	December 18, 2001	Socorro	LINEAR	·	2.2 km	MPC · JPL
126009	2001 YQ_{51}	—	December 18, 2001	Socorro	LINEAR	·	2.2 km	MPC · JPL
126010	2001 YC_{52}	—	December 18, 2001	Socorro	LINEAR	·	2.7 km	MPC · JPL
126011	2001 YE_{52}	—	December 18, 2001	Socorro	LINEAR	·	1.7 km	MPC · JPL
126012	2001 YT_{53}	—	December 18, 2001	Socorro	LINEAR	·	2.8 km	MPC · JPL
126013	2001 YV_{55}	—	December 18, 2001	Socorro	LINEAR	·	1.9 km	MPC · JPL
126014	2001 YV_{57}	—	December 18, 2001	Socorro	LINEAR	NYS	2.2 km	MPC · JPL
126015	2001 YZ_{58}	—	December 18, 2001	Socorro	LINEAR	(5)	2.4 km	MPC · JPL
126016	2001 YD_{59}	—	December 18, 2001	Socorro	LINEAR	·	1.4 km	MPC · JPL
126017	2001 YY_{59}	—	December 18, 2001	Socorro	LINEAR	NYS	3.3 km	MPC · JPL
126018	2001 YE_{60}	—	December 18, 2001	Socorro	LINEAR	·	3.6 km	MPC · JPL
126019	2001 YA_{61}	—	December 18, 2001	Socorro	LINEAR	MAR	2.1 km	MPC · JPL
126020	2001 YD_{61}	—	December 18, 2001	Socorro	LINEAR	NYS	2.3 km	MPC · JPL
126021	2001 YG_{61}	—	December 18, 2001	Socorro	LINEAR	·	2.1 km	MPC · JPL
126022	2001 YU_{61}	—	December 18, 2001	Socorro	LINEAR	·	2.3 km	MPC · JPL
126023	2001 YX_{61}	—	December 18, 2001	Socorro	LINEAR	·	2.1 km	MPC · JPL
126024	2001 YY_{62}	—	December 18, 2001	Socorro	LINEAR	·	2.4 km	MPC · JPL
126025	2001 YG_{63}	—	December 18, 2001	Socorro	LINEAR	·	2.5 km	MPC · JPL
126026	2001 YP_{63}	—	December 18, 2001	Socorro	LINEAR	NYS	2.5 km	MPC · JPL
126027	2001 YW_{63}	—	December 18, 2001	Socorro	LINEAR	·	3.2 km	MPC · JPL
126028	2001 YC_{64}	—	December 18, 2001	Socorro	LINEAR	·	1.5 km	MPC · JPL
126029	2001 YQ_{64}	—	December 18, 2001	Socorro	LINEAR	NYS	1.7 km	MPC · JPL
126030	2001 YM_{65}	—	December 18, 2001	Socorro	LINEAR	·	2.8 km	MPC · JPL
126031	2001 YH_{66}	—	December 18, 2001	Socorro	LINEAR	·	2.0 km	MPC · JPL
126032	2001 YP_{66}	—	December 18, 2001	Socorro	LINEAR	NYS	2.2 km	MPC · JPL
126033	2001 YG_{67}	—	December 18, 2001	Socorro	LINEAR	·	2.3 km	MPC · JPL
126034	2001 YL_{67}	—	December 18, 2001	Socorro	LINEAR	NYS	1.7 km	MPC · JPL
126035	2001 YY_{67}	—	December 18, 2001	Socorro	LINEAR	·	3.1 km	MPC · JPL
126036	2001 YX_{68}	—	December 18, 2001	Socorro	LINEAR	·	2.0 km	MPC · JPL
126037	2001 YA_{69}	—	December 18, 2001	Socorro	LINEAR	·	3.3 km	MPC · JPL
126038	2001 YK_{69}	—	December 18, 2001	Socorro	LINEAR	MAS	1.3 km	MPC · JPL
126039	2001 YS_{69}	—	December 18, 2001	Socorro	LINEAR	·	2.0 km	MPC · JPL
126040	2001 YW_{69}	—	December 18, 2001	Socorro	LINEAR	·	2.4 km	MPC · JPL
126041	2001 YQ_{70}	—	December 18, 2001	Socorro	LINEAR	MAS	1.5 km	MPC · JPL
126042	2001 YB_{71}	—	December 18, 2001	Socorro	LINEAR	·	3.4 km	MPC · JPL
126043	2001 YE_{71}	—	December 18, 2001	Socorro	LINEAR	(5)	2.2 km	MPC · JPL
126044	2001 YU_{71}	—	December 18, 2001	Socorro	LINEAR	·	3.9 km	MPC · JPL
126045	2001 YD_{72}	—	December 18, 2001	Socorro	LINEAR	·	2.2 km	MPC · JPL
126046	2001 YH_{72}	—	December 18, 2001	Socorro	LINEAR	NYS	1.9 km	MPC · JPL
126047	2001 YW_{72}	—	December 18, 2001	Socorro	LINEAR	·	2.2 km	MPC · JPL
126048	2001 YZ_{72}	—	December 18, 2001	Socorro	LINEAR	·	2.4 km	MPC · JPL
126049	2001 YO_{74}	—	December 18, 2001	Socorro	LINEAR	·	3.4 km	MPC · JPL
126050	2001 YW_{74}	—	December 18, 2001	Socorro	LINEAR	·	1.9 km	MPC · JPL
126051	2001 YL_{75}	—	December 18, 2001	Socorro	LINEAR	KOR	2.3 km	MPC · JPL
126052	2001 YS_{75}	—	December 18, 2001	Socorro	LINEAR	·	2.0 km	MPC · JPL
126053	2001 YY_{76}	—	December 18, 2001	Socorro	LINEAR	NYS	2.3 km	MPC · JPL
126054	2001 YJ_{77}	—	December 18, 2001	Socorro	LINEAR	V	1.3 km	MPC · JPL
126055	2001 YD_{78}	—	December 18, 2001	Socorro	LINEAR	·	1.4 km	MPC · JPL
126056	2001 YK_{79}	—	December 18, 2001	Socorro	LINEAR	·	1.7 km	MPC · JPL
126057	2001 YR_{79}	—	December 18, 2001	Socorro	LINEAR	NYS	2.0 km	MPC · JPL
126058	2001 YX_{79}	—	December 18, 2001	Socorro	LINEAR	·	2.6 km	MPC · JPL
126059	2001 YG_{80}	—	December 18, 2001	Socorro	LINEAR	·	3.3 km	MPC · JPL
126060	2001 YL_{80}	—	December 18, 2001	Socorro	LINEAR	·	2.8 km	MPC · JPL
126061	2001 YX_{80}	—	December 18, 2001	Socorro	LINEAR	·	2.2 km	MPC · JPL
126062	2001 YE_{81}	—	December 18, 2001	Socorro	LINEAR	·	1.5 km	MPC · JPL
126063	2001 YH_{81}	—	December 18, 2001	Socorro	LINEAR	THM	4.8 km	MPC · JPL
126064	2001 YJ_{81}	—	December 18, 2001	Socorro	LINEAR	·	3.0 km	MPC · JPL
126065	2001 YL_{81}	—	December 18, 2001	Socorro	LINEAR	·	2.1 km	MPC · JPL
126066	2001 YU_{81}	—	December 18, 2001	Socorro	LINEAR	·	2.4 km	MPC · JPL
126067	2001 YC_{82}	—	December 18, 2001	Socorro	LINEAR	NYS	2.4 km	MPC · JPL
126068	2001 YG_{82}	—	December 18, 2001	Socorro	LINEAR	·	3.0 km	MPC · JPL
126069	2001 YK_{82}	—	December 18, 2001	Socorro	LINEAR	·	2.7 km	MPC · JPL
126070	2001 YW_{82}	—	December 18, 2001	Socorro	LINEAR	·	1.8 km	MPC · JPL
126071	2001 YL_{84}	—	December 18, 2001	Socorro	LINEAR	MAS	1.6 km	MPC · JPL
126072	2001 YQ_{84}	—	December 18, 2001	Socorro	LINEAR	·	4.1 km	MPC · JPL
126073	2001 YZ_{84}	—	December 18, 2001	Socorro	LINEAR	·	2.5 km	MPC · JPL
126074	2001 YE_{85}	—	December 18, 2001	Socorro	LINEAR	HOF	5.1 km	MPC · JPL
126075	2001 YC_{86}	—	December 18, 2001	Socorro	LINEAR	·	2.2 km	MPC · JPL
126076	2001 YV_{86}	—	December 18, 2001	Socorro	LINEAR	NYS	2.0 km	MPC · JPL
126077	2001 YX_{86}	—	December 18, 2001	Socorro	LINEAR	·	5.7 km	MPC · JPL
126078	2001 YL_{87}	—	December 18, 2001	Socorro	LINEAR	·	1.9 km	MPC · JPL
126079	2001 YZ_{87}	—	December 18, 2001	Socorro	LINEAR	·	2.2 km	MPC · JPL
126080	2001 YS_{88}	—	December 18, 2001	Socorro	LINEAR	·	2.2 km	MPC · JPL
126081	2001 YE_{90}	—	December 18, 2001	Socorro	LINEAR	V	1.4 km	MPC · JPL
126082	2001 YH_{90}	—	December 18, 2001	Socorro	LINEAR	·	3.9 km	MPC · JPL
126083	2001 YX_{90}	—	December 17, 2001	Palomar	NEAT	V	1.3 km	MPC · JPL
126084	2001 YB_{91}	—	December 17, 2001	Palomar	NEAT	·	1.3 km	MPC · JPL
126085	2001 YN_{93}	—	December 18, 2001	Kitt Peak	Spacewatch	·	1.2 km	MPC · JPL
126086	2001 YW_{94}	—	December 17, 2001	Palomar	NEAT	NYS	2.3 km	MPC · JPL
126087	2001 YA_{95}	—	December 17, 2001	Palomar	NEAT	·	5.6 km	MPC · JPL
126088	2001 YT_{95}	—	December 18, 2001	Palomar	NEAT	·	1.7 km	MPC · JPL
126089	2001 YA_{96}	—	December 18, 2001	Palomar	NEAT	·	2.0 km	MPC · JPL
126090	2001 YC_{97}	—	December 17, 2001	Socorro	LINEAR	·	1.3 km	MPC · JPL
126091	2001 YD_{101}	—	December 17, 2001	Socorro	LINEAR	NYS	1.8 km	MPC · JPL
126092	2001 YR_{101}	—	December 17, 2001	Socorro	LINEAR	·	2.4 km	MPC · JPL
126093	2001 YU_{101}	—	December 17, 2001	Socorro	LINEAR	·	2.1 km	MPC · JPL
126094	2001 YG_{102}	—	December 17, 2001	Socorro	LINEAR	KOR	2.6 km	MPC · JPL
126095	2001 YM_{102}	—	December 17, 2001	Socorro	LINEAR	·	3.2 km	MPC · JPL
126096	2001 YW_{103}	—	December 17, 2001	Socorro	LINEAR	·	2.3 km	MPC · JPL
126097	2001 YC_{104}	—	December 17, 2001	Socorro	LINEAR	ADE	5.4 km	MPC · JPL
126098	2001 YE_{104}	—	December 17, 2001	Socorro	LINEAR	NYS	2.0 km	MPC · JPL
126099	2001 YF_{104}	—	December 17, 2001	Socorro	LINEAR	·	3.2 km	MPC · JPL
126100	2001 YQ_{105}	—	December 17, 2001	Socorro	LINEAR	·	1.9 km	MPC · JPL

== 126101–126200 ==
back to top

Designation			Discovery			Properties		Ref
Permanent	Provisional	Named after	Date	Site	Discoverer(s)	Category	Diam.	Ref
126101	2001 YO_{106}	—	December 17, 2001	Socorro	LINEAR	V	1.3 km	MPC · JPL
126102	2001 YJ_{107}	—	December 17, 2001	Socorro	LINEAR	MAS	1.5 km	MPC · JPL
126103	2001 YT_{107}	—	December 17, 2001	Socorro	LINEAR	(5)	2.0 km	MPC · JPL
126104	2001 YB_{108}	—	December 17, 2001	Socorro	LINEAR	·	2.1 km	MPC · JPL
126105	2001 YK_{108}	—	December 17, 2001	Socorro	LINEAR	·	4.4 km	MPC · JPL
126106	2001 YC_{109}	—	December 18, 2001	Socorro	LINEAR	V	1.0 km	MPC · JPL
126107	2001 YZ_{109}	—	December 18, 2001	Socorro	LINEAR	·	2.2 km	MPC · JPL
126108	2001 YA_{110}	—	December 18, 2001	Socorro	LINEAR	·	4.8 km	MPC · JPL
126109	2001 YB_{110}	—	December 18, 2001	Socorro	LINEAR	·	2.9 km	MPC · JPL
126110	2001 YZ_{110}	—	December 18, 2001	Anderson Mesa	LONEOS	V	2.4 km	MPC · JPL
126111	2001 YA_{111}	—	December 18, 2001	Anderson Mesa	LONEOS	V	1.3 km	MPC · JPL
126112	2001 YL_{111}	—	December 18, 2001	Anderson Mesa	LONEOS	HNS	2.7 km	MPC · JPL
126113	2001 YP_{111}	—	December 18, 2001	Anderson Mesa	LONEOS	·	1.8 km	MPC · JPL
126114	2001 YF_{112}	—	December 19, 2001	Socorro	LINEAR	·	2.4 km	MPC · JPL
126115	2001 YM_{112}	—	December 19, 2001	Socorro	LINEAR	·	1.9 km	MPC · JPL
126116	2001 YT_{113}	—	December 17, 2001	Palomar	NEAT	·	4.9 km	MPC · JPL
126117	2001 YW_{113}	—	December 19, 2001	Socorro	LINEAR	·	2.8 km	MPC · JPL
126118	2001 YY_{113}	—	December 17, 2001	Palomar	NEAT	·	2.1 km	MPC · JPL
126119	2001 YZ_{113}	—	December 19, 2001	Socorro	LINEAR	CYB	5.8 km	MPC · JPL
126120	2001 YA_{115}	—	December 17, 2001	Socorro	LINEAR	PHO	2.0 km	MPC · JPL
126121	2001 YB_{115}	—	December 17, 2001	Socorro	LINEAR	·	3.7 km	MPC · JPL
126122	2001 YP_{115}	—	December 17, 2001	Socorro	LINEAR	·	2.1 km	MPC · JPL
126123	2001 YR_{115}	—	December 17, 2001	Socorro	LINEAR	·	3.1 km	MPC · JPL
126124	2001 YO_{116}	—	December 18, 2001	Socorro	LINEAR	·	1.9 km	MPC · JPL
126125	2001 YF_{118}	—	December 18, 2001	Socorro	LINEAR	·	2.9 km	MPC · JPL
126126	2001 YK_{119}	—	December 19, 2001	Socorro	LINEAR	MAR	2.8 km	MPC · JPL
126127	2001 YZ_{119}	—	December 19, 2001	Socorro	LINEAR	·	3.8 km	MPC · JPL
126128	2001 YK_{120}	—	December 20, 2001	Socorro	LINEAR	·	1.9 km	MPC · JPL
126129	2001 YN_{120}	—	December 20, 2001	Socorro	LINEAR	·	3.4 km	MPC · JPL
126130	2001 YY_{120}	—	December 20, 2001	Kitt Peak	Spacewatch	EUN	2.5 km	MPC · JPL
126131	2001 YJ_{122}	—	December 17, 2001	Socorro	LINEAR	·	1.9 km	MPC · JPL
126132	2001 YP_{122}	—	December 17, 2001	Socorro	LINEAR	V	1.1 km	MPC · JPL
126133	2001 YD_{123}	—	December 17, 2001	Socorro	LINEAR	·	2.0 km	MPC · JPL
126134	2001 YD_{124}	—	December 17, 2001	Socorro	LINEAR	V	1.2 km	MPC · JPL
126135	2001 YR_{124}	—	December 17, 2001	Socorro	LINEAR	·	2.1 km	MPC · JPL
126136	2001 YC_{126}	—	December 17, 2001	Socorro	LINEAR	·	1.5 km	MPC · JPL
126137	2001 YJ_{126}	—	December 17, 2001	Socorro	LINEAR	·	3.8 km	MPC · JPL
126138	2001 YK_{126}	—	December 17, 2001	Socorro	LINEAR	·	2.3 km	MPC · JPL
126139	2001 YD_{128}	—	December 17, 2001	Socorro	LINEAR	·	2.3 km	MPC · JPL
126140	2001 YG_{128}	—	December 17, 2001	Socorro	LINEAR	·	1.7 km	MPC · JPL
126141	2001 YP_{128}	—	December 17, 2001	Socorro	LINEAR	·	3.9 km	MPC · JPL
126142	2001 YK_{129}	—	December 17, 2001	Socorro	LINEAR	·	2.6 km	MPC · JPL
126143	2001 YZ_{129}	—	December 17, 2001	Socorro	LINEAR	(5)	2.3 km	MPC · JPL
126144	2001 YB_{130}	—	December 17, 2001	Socorro	LINEAR	·	1.6 km	MPC · JPL
126145	2001 YH_{132}	—	December 19, 2001	Socorro	LINEAR	·	1.6 km	MPC · JPL
126146	2001 YU_{132}	—	December 20, 2001	Socorro	LINEAR	V	1.5 km	MPC · JPL
126147	2001 YD_{134}	—	December 17, 2001	Socorro	LINEAR	·	1.1 km	MPC · JPL
126148	2001 YV_{134}	—	December 18, 2001	Socorro	LINEAR	(194)	3.2 km	MPC · JPL
126149	2001 YN_{135}	—	December 20, 2001	Socorro	LINEAR	HNS	2.5 km	MPC · JPL
126150	2001 YZ_{136}	—	December 22, 2001	Socorro	LINEAR	·	4.5 km	MPC · JPL
126151	2001 YZ_{137}	—	December 22, 2001	Socorro	LINEAR	·	2.7 km	MPC · JPL
126152	2001 YO_{138}	—	December 18, 2001	Kitt Peak	Spacewatch	·	1.9 km	MPC · JPL
126153	2001 YN_{139}	—	December 24, 2001	Palomar	NEAT	·	2.3 km	MPC · JPL
126154	2001 YH_{140}	—	December 18, 2001	Palomar	C. A. Trujillo, M. E. Brown	res · 3:5	345 km	MPC · JPL
126155	2001 YJ_{140}	—	December 20, 2001	Palomar	C. A. Trujillo, M. E. Brown	plutino	154 km	MPC · JPL
126156	2001 YE_{149}	—	December 19, 2001	Palomar	NEAT	·	3.3 km	MPC · JPL
126157	2001 YG_{150}	—	December 19, 2001	Socorro	LINEAR	·	2.7 km	MPC · JPL
126158	2001 YN_{152}	—	December 19, 2001	Palomar	NEAT	·	2.4 km	MPC · JPL
126159	2001 YD_{157}	—	December 20, 2001	Socorro	LINEAR	HNS	3.3 km	MPC · JPL
126160 Fabienkuntz	2002 AF	Fabienkuntz	January 4, 2002	Vicques	M. Ory	·	3.1 km	MPC · JPL
126161 Piazzano	2002 AK	Piazzano	January 4, 2002	San Marcello	A. Boattini, M. Tombelli	·	2.3 km	MPC · JPL
126162	2002 AY	—	January 13, 2002	Socorro	LINEAR	·	2.5 km	MPC · JPL
126163	2002 AM_{1}	—	January 5, 2002	Haleakala	NEAT	·	2.8 km	MPC · JPL
126164	2002 AO_{1}	—	January 6, 2002	Oizumi	T. Kobayashi	MAS	1.3 km	MPC · JPL
126165	2002 AX_{3}	—	January 8, 2002	Oizumi	T. Kobayashi	·	1.8 km	MPC · JPL
126166	2002 AM_{4}	—	January 8, 2002	Socorro	LINEAR	BAR	2.1 km	MPC · JPL
126167	2002 AL_{5}	—	January 9, 2002	Oizumi	T. Kobayashi	PHO	5.0 km	MPC · JPL
126168	2002 AF_{6}	—	January 5, 2002	Kitt Peak	Spacewatch	AGN	1.9 km	MPC · JPL
126169	2002 AR_{7}	—	January 2, 2002	Haleakala	NEAT	PHO	5.0 km	MPC · JPL
126170	2002 AV_{7}	—	January 5, 2002	Palomar	NEAT	(5)	2.1 km	MPC · JPL
126171	2002 AU_{8}	—	January 7, 2002	Kitt Peak	Spacewatch	·	2.4 km	MPC · JPL
126172	2002 AZ_{8}	—	January 9, 2002	Bohyunsan	Bohyunsan	·	1.5 km	MPC · JPL
126173	2002 AH_{9}	—	January 11, 2002	Farpoint	G. Hug	·	3.2 km	MPC · JPL
126174	2002 AA_{10}	—	January 11, 2002	Desert Eagle	W. K. Y. Yeung	(5)	1.9 km	MPC · JPL
126175	2002 AN_{10}	—	January 4, 2002	Haleakala	NEAT	NYS	2.1 km	MPC · JPL
126176	2002 AQ_{10}	—	January 5, 2002	Haleakala	NEAT	·	3.1 km	MPC · JPL
126177 Filippofrontera	2002 AP_{12}	Filippofrontera	January 10, 2002	Campo Imperatore	F. Bernardi	·	4.5 km	MPC · JPL
126178	2002 AW_{13}	—	January 12, 2002	Desert Eagle	W. K. Y. Yeung	·	2.1 km	MPC · JPL
126179	2002 AY_{13}	—	January 12, 2002	Desert Eagle	W. K. Y. Yeung	·	2.6 km	MPC · JPL
126180	2002 AC_{14}	—	January 12, 2002	Desert Eagle	W. K. Y. Yeung	EUN	2.9 km	MPC · JPL
126181	2002 AB_{16}	—	January 4, 2002	Haleakala	NEAT	·	5.5 km	MPC · JPL
126182	2002 AC_{18}	—	January 8, 2002	Kitt Peak	Spacewatch	·	2.3 km	MPC · JPL
126183 Larrymitchell	2002 AS_{18}	Larrymitchell	January 8, 2002	Needville	Needville	·	2.3 km	MPC · JPL
126184	2002 AS_{19}	—	January 8, 2002	Socorro	LINEAR	·	4.1 km	MPC · JPL
126185	2002 AH_{20}	—	January 5, 2002	Palomar	NEAT	·	4.5 km	MPC · JPL
126186	2002 AU_{20}	—	January 7, 2002	Palomar	NEAT	·	3.3 km	MPC · JPL
126187	2002 AA_{21}	—	January 7, 2002	Socorro	LINEAR	PHO	3.0 km	MPC · JPL
126188	2002 AK_{21}	—	January 9, 2002	Socorro	LINEAR	PHO	3.2 km	MPC · JPL
126189	2002 AH_{22}	—	January 9, 2002	Kitt Peak	Spacewatch	·	2.6 km	MPC · JPL
126190	2002 AK_{22}	—	January 7, 2002	Haleakala	NEAT	·	1.9 km	MPC · JPL
126191	2002 AN_{23}	—	January 15, 2002	Socorro	LINEAR	·	1.8 km	MPC · JPL
126192	2002 AR_{23}	—	January 5, 2002	Haleakala	NEAT	·	2.2 km	MPC · JPL
126193	2002 AG_{26}	—	January 9, 2002	Kitt Peak	Spacewatch	·	1.7 km	MPC · JPL
126194	2002 AL_{30}	—	January 9, 2002	Socorro	LINEAR	·	2.2 km	MPC · JPL
126195	2002 AQ_{32}	—	January 8, 2002	Palomar	NEAT	·	2.4 km	MPC · JPL
126196	2002 AO_{33}	—	January 7, 2002	Kitt Peak	Spacewatch	·	2.0 km	MPC · JPL
126197	2002 AC_{36}	—	January 9, 2002	Socorro	LINEAR	NYS	2.1 km	MPC · JPL
126198	2002 AG_{36}	—	January 9, 2002	Socorro	LINEAR	·	1.6 km	MPC · JPL
126199	2002 AB_{37}	—	January 9, 2002	Socorro	LINEAR	(5)	2.2 km	MPC · JPL
126200	2002 AQ_{37}	—	January 9, 2002	Socorro	LINEAR	·	2.4 km	MPC · JPL

== 126201–126300 ==
back to top

Designation			Discovery			Properties		Ref
Permanent	Provisional	Named after	Date	Site	Discoverer(s)	Category	Diam.	Ref
126201	2002 AP_{38}	—	January 9, 2002	Socorro	LINEAR	·	2.4 km	MPC · JPL
126202	2002 AD_{39}	—	January 9, 2002	Socorro	LINEAR	·	2.9 km	MPC · JPL
126203	2002 AL_{40}	—	January 9, 2002	Socorro	LINEAR	NYS	2.1 km	MPC · JPL
126204	2002 AO_{40}	—	January 9, 2002	Socorro	LINEAR	JUN	5.3 km	MPC · JPL
126205	2002 AQ_{40}	—	January 9, 2002	Socorro	LINEAR	·	1.7 km	MPC · JPL
126206	2002 AU_{40}	—	January 9, 2002	Socorro	LINEAR	(5)	2.5 km	MPC · JPL
126207	2002 AS_{41}	—	January 9, 2002	Socorro	LINEAR	·	3.5 km	MPC · JPL
126208	2002 AK_{42}	—	January 9, 2002	Socorro	LINEAR	NYS	2.0 km	MPC · JPL
126209	2002 AQ_{42}	—	January 9, 2002	Socorro	LINEAR	·	2.2 km	MPC · JPL
126210	2002 AV_{42}	—	January 9, 2002	Socorro	LINEAR	·	1.9 km	MPC · JPL
126211	2002 AD_{43}	—	January 9, 2002	Socorro	LINEAR	·	2.1 km	MPC · JPL
126212	2002 AY_{43}	—	January 9, 2002	Socorro	LINEAR	·	2.9 km	MPC · JPL
126213	2002 AC_{44}	—	January 9, 2002	Socorro	LINEAR	·	2.1 km	MPC · JPL
126214	2002 AW_{45}	—	January 9, 2002	Socorro	LINEAR	·	1.9 km	MPC · JPL
126215	2002 AR_{46}	—	January 9, 2002	Socorro	LINEAR	·	2.4 km	MPC · JPL
126216	2002 AU_{46}	—	January 9, 2002	Socorro	LINEAR	·	3.2 km	MPC · JPL
126217	2002 AH_{47}	—	January 9, 2002	Socorro	LINEAR	NYS	1.3 km	MPC · JPL
126218	2002 AC_{48}	—	January 9, 2002	Socorro	LINEAR	·	2.7 km	MPC · JPL
126219	2002 AR_{48}	—	January 9, 2002	Socorro	LINEAR	KOR	2.7 km	MPC · JPL
126220	2002 AS_{48}	—	January 9, 2002	Socorro	LINEAR	·	3.1 km	MPC · JPL
126221	2002 AD_{49}	—	January 9, 2002	Socorro	LINEAR	·	4.0 km	MPC · JPL
126222	2002 AQ_{49}	—	January 9, 2002	Socorro	LINEAR	MAS	1.6 km	MPC · JPL
126223	2002 AR_{49}	—	January 9, 2002	Socorro	LINEAR	·	2.5 km	MPC · JPL
126224	2002 AQ_{50}	—	January 9, 2002	Socorro	LINEAR	·	1.9 km	MPC · JPL
126225	2002 AR_{51}	—	January 9, 2002	Socorro	LINEAR	·	1.9 km	MPC · JPL
126226	2002 AU_{51}	—	January 9, 2002	Socorro	LINEAR	NYS	2.3 km	MPC · JPL
126227	2002 AB_{52}	—	January 9, 2002	Socorro	LINEAR	·	2.5 km	MPC · JPL
126228	2002 AO_{53}	—	January 9, 2002	Socorro	LINEAR	·	2.5 km	MPC · JPL
126229	2002 AF_{55}	—	January 9, 2002	Socorro	LINEAR	·	1.6 km	MPC · JPL
126230	2002 AV_{55}	—	January 9, 2002	Socorro	LINEAR	HOF	4.5 km	MPC · JPL
126231	2002 AY_{55}	—	January 9, 2002	Socorro	LINEAR	KOR	2.2 km	MPC · JPL
126232	2002 AK_{56}	—	January 9, 2002	Socorro	LINEAR	·	3.1 km	MPC · JPL
126233	2002 AC_{58}	—	January 9, 2002	Socorro	LINEAR	·	2.3 km	MPC · JPL
126234	2002 AQ_{58}	—	January 9, 2002	Socorro	LINEAR	·	2.9 km	MPC · JPL
126235	2002 AY_{58}	—	January 9, 2002	Socorro	LINEAR	NYS	2.6 km	MPC · JPL
126236	2002 AC_{59}	—	January 9, 2002	Socorro	LINEAR	·	1.9 km	MPC · JPL
126237	2002 AS_{59}	—	January 9, 2002	Socorro	LINEAR	·	5.0 km	MPC · JPL
126238	2002 AJ_{60}	—	January 9, 2002	Socorro	LINEAR	·	1.8 km	MPC · JPL
126239	2002 AT_{60}	—	January 9, 2002	Socorro	LINEAR	·	3.0 km	MPC · JPL
126240	2002 AY_{61}	—	January 11, 2002	Socorro	LINEAR	·	4.4 km	MPC · JPL
126241	2002 AL_{62}	—	January 11, 2002	Socorro	LINEAR	·	4.1 km	MPC · JPL
126242	2002 AX_{62}	—	January 11, 2002	Socorro	LINEAR	·	4.0 km	MPC · JPL
126243	2002 AB_{64}	—	January 11, 2002	Socorro	LINEAR	·	4.2 km	MPC · JPL
126244	2002 AQ_{66}	—	January 12, 2002	Socorro	LINEAR	·	2.4 km	MPC · JPL
126245 Kandókálmán	2002 AY_{66}	Kandókálmán	January 13, 2002	Piszkéstető	K. Sárneczky, Z. Heiner	·	1.2 km	MPC · JPL
126246 Losignore	2002 AB_{67}	Losignore	January 9, 2002	Campo Imperatore	F. Bernardi	·	3.8 km	MPC · JPL
126247 Laurafaggioli	2002 AL_{67}	Laurafaggioli	January 9, 2002	Campo Imperatore	F. Bernardi, A.M. Teodorescu	·	2.3 km	MPC · JPL
126248 Dariooliviero	2002 AO_{67}	Dariooliviero	January 9, 2002	Campo Imperatore	A.M. Teodorescu, F. Bernardi	·	2.4 km	MPC · JPL
126249 Gabrielgraur	2002 AP_{67}	Gabrielgraur	January 9, 2002	Campo Imperatore	A.M. Teodorescu, F. Bernardi	NYS	2.0 km	MPC · JPL
126250	2002 AS_{69}	—	January 8, 2002	Socorro	LINEAR	·	4.1 km	MPC · JPL
126251	2002 AA_{70}	—	January 8, 2002	Socorro	LINEAR	·	3.3 km	MPC · JPL
126252	2002 AF_{70}	—	January 8, 2002	Socorro	LINEAR	·	2.6 km	MPC · JPL
126253	2002 AG_{70}	—	January 8, 2002	Socorro	LINEAR	·	2.1 km	MPC · JPL
126254	2002 AO_{71}	—	January 8, 2002	Socorro	LINEAR	·	4.3 km	MPC · JPL
126255	2002 AR_{71}	—	January 8, 2002	Socorro	LINEAR	·	7.5 km	MPC · JPL
126256	2002 AD_{72}	—	January 8, 2002	Socorro	LINEAR	·	2.1 km	MPC · JPL
126257	2002 AT_{72}	—	January 8, 2002	Socorro	LINEAR	·	1.6 km	MPC · JPL
126258	2002 AS_{73}	—	January 8, 2002	Socorro	LINEAR	·	2.0 km	MPC · JPL
126259	2002 AE_{76}	—	January 8, 2002	Socorro	LINEAR	MRX	2.3 km	MPC · JPL
126260	2002 AM_{77}	—	January 8, 2002	Socorro	LINEAR	·	1.6 km	MPC · JPL
126261	2002 AL_{78}	—	January 8, 2002	Socorro	LINEAR	PAD	2.7 km	MPC · JPL
126262	2002 AU_{80}	—	January 9, 2002	Socorro	LINEAR	V	1.3 km	MPC · JPL
126263	2002 AH_{81}	—	January 9, 2002	Socorro	LINEAR	V	1.5 km	MPC · JPL
126264	2002 AQ_{81}	—	January 9, 2002	Socorro	LINEAR	·	2.1 km	MPC · JPL
126265	2002 AN_{82}	—	January 9, 2002	Socorro	LINEAR	·	2.3 km	MPC · JPL
126266	2002 AF_{84}	—	January 9, 2002	Socorro	LINEAR	·	2.2 km	MPC · JPL
126267	2002 AN_{86}	—	January 9, 2002	Socorro	LINEAR	·	2.6 km	MPC · JPL
126268	2002 AT_{87}	—	January 9, 2002	Socorro	LINEAR	·	2.4 km	MPC · JPL
126269	2002 AO_{89}	—	January 9, 2002	Socorro	LINEAR	·	2.8 km	MPC · JPL
126270	2002 AT_{89}	—	January 11, 2002	Socorro	LINEAR	·	2.0 km	MPC · JPL
126271	2002 AD_{90}	—	January 11, 2002	Socorro	LINEAR	·	3.8 km	MPC · JPL
126272	2002 AM_{90}	—	January 11, 2002	Socorro	LINEAR	(5)	2.3 km	MPC · JPL
126273	2002 AD_{94}	—	January 8, 2002	Socorro	LINEAR	AEO	2.1 km	MPC · JPL
126274	2002 AA_{95}	—	January 8, 2002	Socorro	LINEAR	MRX	1.8 km	MPC · JPL
126275	2002 AJ_{96}	—	January 8, 2002	Socorro	LINEAR	·	1.8 km	MPC · JPL
126276	2002 AK_{96}	—	January 8, 2002	Socorro	LINEAR	·	2.7 km	MPC · JPL
126277	2002 AR_{96}	—	January 8, 2002	Socorro	LINEAR	·	4.3 km	MPC · JPL
126278	2002 AF_{97}	—	January 8, 2002	Socorro	LINEAR	·	1.8 km	MPC · JPL
126279	2002 AU_{97}	—	January 8, 2002	Socorro	LINEAR	·	2.3 km	MPC · JPL
126280	2002 AD_{98}	—	January 8, 2002	Socorro	LINEAR	·	2.1 km	MPC · JPL
126281	2002 AN_{100}	—	January 8, 2002	Socorro	LINEAR	·	2.2 km	MPC · JPL
126282	2002 AR_{100}	—	January 8, 2002	Socorro	LINEAR	·	2.4 km	MPC · JPL
126283	2002 AG_{102}	—	January 8, 2002	Socorro	LINEAR	·	2.0 km	MPC · JPL
126284	2002 AX_{102}	—	January 8, 2002	Socorro	LINEAR	NYS	2.1 km	MPC · JPL
126285	2002 AZ_{103}	—	January 9, 2002	Socorro	LINEAR	EOS	3.1 km	MPC · JPL
126286	2002 AC_{104}	—	January 9, 2002	Socorro	LINEAR	·	1.8 km	MPC · JPL
126287	2002 AG_{104}	—	January 9, 2002	Socorro	LINEAR	·	2.6 km	MPC · JPL
126288	2002 AO_{104}	—	January 9, 2002	Socorro	LINEAR	·	2.8 km	MPC · JPL
126289	2002 AY_{104}	—	January 9, 2002	Socorro	LINEAR	·	3.1 km	MPC · JPL
126290	2002 AZ_{105}	—	January 9, 2002	Socorro	LINEAR	·	2.1 km	MPC · JPL
126291	2002 AY_{106}	—	January 9, 2002	Socorro	LINEAR	·	2.9 km	MPC · JPL
126292	2002 AB_{107}	—	January 9, 2002	Socorro	LINEAR	NYS	2.1 km	MPC · JPL
126293	2002 AY_{107}	—	January 9, 2002	Socorro	LINEAR	·	2.2 km	MPC · JPL
126294	2002 AR_{108}	—	January 9, 2002	Socorro	LINEAR	·	2.3 km	MPC · JPL
126295	2002 AO_{109}	—	January 9, 2002	Socorro	LINEAR	·	2.2 km	MPC · JPL
126296	2002 AH_{110}	—	January 9, 2002	Socorro	LINEAR	·	1.8 km	MPC · JPL
126297	2002 AZ_{110}	—	January 9, 2002	Socorro	LINEAR	·	2.4 km	MPC · JPL
126298	2002 AD_{111}	—	January 9, 2002	Socorro	LINEAR	·	2.2 km	MPC · JPL
126299	2002 AZ_{114}	—	January 9, 2002	Socorro	LINEAR	·	3.3 km	MPC · JPL
126300	2002 AL_{116}	—	January 9, 2002	Socorro	LINEAR	·	2.3 km	MPC · JPL

== 126301–126400 ==
back to top

Designation			Discovery			Properties		Ref
Permanent	Provisional	Named after	Date	Site	Discoverer(s)	Category	Diam.	Ref
126301	2002 AT_{116}	—	January 9, 2002	Socorro	LINEAR	·	1.7 km	MPC · JPL
126302	2002 AO_{118}	—	January 9, 2002	Socorro	LINEAR	·	3.1 km	MPC · JPL
126303	2002 AG_{119}	—	January 9, 2002	Socorro	LINEAR	·	3.4 km	MPC · JPL
126304	2002 AX_{119}	—	January 9, 2002	Socorro	LINEAR	EUN	2.0 km	MPC · JPL
126305	2002 AQ_{120}	—	January 9, 2002	Socorro	LINEAR	·	3.5 km	MPC · JPL
126306	2002 AR_{120}	—	January 9, 2002	Socorro	LINEAR	·	5.1 km	MPC · JPL
126307	2002 AY_{120}	—	January 9, 2002	Socorro	LINEAR	·	5.6 km	MPC · JPL
126308	2002 AA_{121}	—	January 9, 2002	Socorro	LINEAR	(5)	1.9 km	MPC · JPL
126309	2002 AW_{121}	—	January 9, 2002	Socorro	LINEAR	·	2.0 km	MPC · JPL
126310	2002 AJ_{123}	—	January 9, 2002	Socorro	LINEAR	·	2.4 km	MPC · JPL
126311	2002 AT_{123}	—	January 9, 2002	Socorro	LINEAR	NYS	2.1 km	MPC · JPL
126312	2002 AZ_{124}	—	January 11, 2002	Socorro	LINEAR	·	4.9 km	MPC · JPL
126313	2002 AN_{125}	—	January 11, 2002	Socorro	LINEAR	ADE	4.6 km	MPC · JPL
126314	2002 AG_{126}	—	January 12, 2002	Socorro	LINEAR	·	2.0 km	MPC · JPL
126315 Bláthy	2002 AH_{130}	Bláthy	January 13, 2002	Piszkéstető	K. Sárneczky, Z. Heiner	·	2.5 km	MPC · JPL
126316	2002 AB_{131}	—	January 12, 2002	Palomar	NEAT	HNS	2.9 km	MPC · JPL
126317	2002 AL_{133}	—	January 9, 2002	Socorro	LINEAR	·	1.9 km	MPC · JPL
126318	2002 AE_{135}	—	January 9, 2002	Socorro	LINEAR	MAS	1.7 km	MPC · JPL
126319	2002 AW_{138}	—	January 9, 2002	Socorro	LINEAR	AEO	2.0 km	MPC · JPL
126320	2002 AP_{140}	—	January 13, 2002	Socorro	LINEAR	·	1.5 km	MPC · JPL
126321	2002 AX_{140}	—	January 13, 2002	Socorro	LINEAR	NYS	1.9 km	MPC · JPL
126322	2002 AX_{143}	—	January 13, 2002	Socorro	LINEAR	·	1.3 km	MPC · JPL
126323	2002 AD_{145}	—	January 13, 2002	Socorro	LINEAR	AGN	2.0 km	MPC · JPL
126324	2002 AK_{145}	—	January 13, 2002	Socorro	LINEAR	·	2.8 km	MPC · JPL
126325	2002 AG_{146}	—	January 13, 2002	Socorro	LINEAR	·	1.7 km	MPC · JPL
126326	2002 AK_{148}	—	January 14, 2002	Haleakala	NEAT	MAS	2.0 km	MPC · JPL
126327	2002 AR_{149}	—	January 14, 2002	Socorro	LINEAR	·	1.8 km	MPC · JPL
126328	2002 AX_{149}	—	January 14, 2002	Socorro	LINEAR	CLA	3.0 km	MPC · JPL
126329	2002 AD_{150}	—	January 14, 2002	Socorro	LINEAR	·	1.9 km	MPC · JPL
126330	2002 AG_{150}	—	January 14, 2002	Socorro	LINEAR	·	1.6 km	MPC · JPL
126331	2002 AJ_{151}	—	January 14, 2002	Socorro	LINEAR	·	3.2 km	MPC · JPL
126332	2002 AB_{152}	—	January 14, 2002	Socorro	LINEAR	V	1.8 km	MPC · JPL
126333	2002 AQ_{152}	—	January 14, 2002	Socorro	LINEAR	·	2.8 km	MPC · JPL
126334	2002 AW_{152}	—	January 14, 2002	Socorro	LINEAR	·	2.1 km	MPC · JPL
126335	2002 AP_{153}	—	January 14, 2002	Socorro	LINEAR	NYS	2.8 km	MPC · JPL
126336	2002 AX_{153}	—	January 14, 2002	Socorro	LINEAR	·	1.7 km	MPC · JPL
126337	2002 AE_{154}	—	January 14, 2002	Socorro	LINEAR	·	4.0 km	MPC · JPL
126338	2002 AJ_{154}	—	January 14, 2002	Socorro	LINEAR	·	1.7 km	MPC · JPL
126339	2002 AP_{154}	—	January 14, 2002	Socorro	LINEAR	·	2.8 km	MPC · JPL
126340	2002 AU_{157}	—	January 13, 2002	Socorro	LINEAR	·	3.5 km	MPC · JPL
126341	2002 AH_{160}	—	January 13, 2002	Socorro	LINEAR	NYS	2.3 km	MPC · JPL
126342	2002 AU_{161}	—	January 13, 2002	Socorro	LINEAR	·	2.2 km	MPC · JPL
126343	2002 AW_{161}	—	January 13, 2002	Socorro	LINEAR	·	1.3 km	MPC · JPL
126344	2002 AJ_{162}	—	January 13, 2002	Socorro	LINEAR	·	2.5 km	MPC · JPL
126345	2002 AO_{162}	—	January 13, 2002	Socorro	LINEAR	·	2.5 km	MPC · JPL
126346	2002 AO_{163}	—	January 13, 2002	Socorro	LINEAR	·	1.7 km	MPC · JPL
126347	2002 AX_{163}	—	January 13, 2002	Socorro	LINEAR	·	1.9 km	MPC · JPL
126348	2002 AK_{165}	—	January 13, 2002	Socorro	LINEAR	·	2.9 km	MPC · JPL
126349	2002 AU_{166}	—	January 13, 2002	Socorro	LINEAR	EOS	4.8 km	MPC · JPL
126350	2002 AY_{166}	—	January 13, 2002	Socorro	LINEAR	(5)	3.8 km	MPC · JPL
126351	2002 AC_{167}	—	January 13, 2002	Socorro	LINEAR	·	5.4 km	MPC · JPL
126352	2002 AO_{167}	—	January 13, 2002	Socorro	LINEAR	HNS	2.8 km	MPC · JPL
126353	2002 AD_{169}	—	January 14, 2002	Socorro	LINEAR	·	1.9 km	MPC · JPL
126354	2002 AL_{169}	—	January 14, 2002	Socorro	LINEAR	·	2.1 km	MPC · JPL
126355	2002 AN_{169}	—	January 14, 2002	Socorro	LINEAR	·	3.6 km	MPC · JPL
126356	2002 AD_{170}	—	January 14, 2002	Socorro	LINEAR	NYS	1.6 km	MPC · JPL
126357	2002 AA_{171}	—	January 14, 2002	Socorro	LINEAR	·	2.8 km	MPC · JPL
126358	2002 AU_{172}	—	January 14, 2002	Socorro	LINEAR	·	2.1 km	MPC · JPL
126359	2002 AG_{174}	—	January 14, 2002	Socorro	LINEAR	·	4.3 km	MPC · JPL
126360	2002 AE_{175}	—	January 14, 2002	Socorro	LINEAR	·	4.7 km	MPC · JPL
126361	2002 AA_{179}	—	January 14, 2002	Socorro	LINEAR	MIS	3.7 km	MPC · JPL
126362	2002 AG_{181}	—	January 5, 2002	Palomar	NEAT	·	3.6 km	MPC · JPL
126363	2002 AR_{182}	—	January 5, 2002	Palomar	NEAT	EUN · slow?	2.9 km	MPC · JPL
126364	2002 AY_{182}	—	January 5, 2002	Haleakala	NEAT	·	2.4 km	MPC · JPL
126365	2002 AR_{184}	—	January 7, 2002	Anderson Mesa	LONEOS	·	2.8 km	MPC · JPL
126366	2002 AF_{185}	—	January 8, 2002	Palomar	NEAT	MAR	1.8 km	MPC · JPL
126367	2002 AZ_{186}	—	January 8, 2002	Socorro	LINEAR	·	2.7 km	MPC · JPL
126368	2002 AB_{187}	—	January 8, 2002	Socorro	LINEAR	·	3.1 km	MPC · JPL
126369	2002 AK_{187}	—	January 8, 2002	Socorro	LINEAR	·	2.8 km	MPC · JPL
126370	2002 AR_{187}	—	January 8, 2002	Palomar	NEAT	·	2.3 km	MPC · JPL
126371	2002 AH_{188}	—	January 9, 2002	Socorro	LINEAR	·	2.2 km	MPC · JPL
126372	2002 AS_{188}	—	January 10, 2002	Palomar	NEAT	·	3.8 km	MPC · JPL
126373	2002 AT_{190}	—	January 11, 2002	Anderson Mesa	LONEOS	·	2.3 km	MPC · JPL
126374	2002 AV_{190}	—	January 11, 2002	Socorro	LINEAR	·	3.7 km	MPC · JPL
126375	2002 AF_{193}	—	January 12, 2002	Palomar	NEAT	·	5.2 km	MPC · JPL
126376	2002 AP_{193}	—	January 12, 2002	Socorro	LINEAR	·	3.2 km	MPC · JPL
126377	2002 AU_{193}	—	January 12, 2002	Socorro	LINEAR	·	2.3 km	MPC · JPL
126378	2002 AM_{195}	—	January 13, 2002	Socorro	LINEAR	·	3.0 km	MPC · JPL
126379	2002 AU_{197}	—	January 15, 2002	Haleakala	NEAT	EUN	2.6 km	MPC · JPL
126380	2002 AE_{199}	—	January 8, 2002	Socorro	LINEAR	·	4.4 km	MPC · JPL
126381	2002 AP_{200}	—	January 9, 2002	Socorro	LINEAR	·	3.2 km	MPC · JPL
126382	2002 AC_{201}	—	January 13, 2002	Socorro	LINEAR	·	2.7 km	MPC · JPL
126383	2002 AP_{202}	—	January 13, 2002	Socorro	LINEAR	·	3.9 km	MPC · JPL
126384	2002 AO_{203}	—	January 8, 2002	Kitt Peak	Spacewatch	·	1.4 km	MPC · JPL
126385	2002 AW_{203}	—	January 14, 2002	Kitt Peak	Spacewatch	AGN	2.0 km	MPC · JPL
126386	2002 BT	—	January 21, 2002	Desert Eagle	W. K. Y. Yeung	·	4.6 km	MPC · JPL
126387	2002 BZ	—	January 18, 2002	Socorro	LINEAR	·	1.9 km	MPC · JPL
126388	2002 BS_{1}	—	January 20, 2002	Desert Eagle	W. K. Y. Yeung	NEM	3.3 km	MPC · JPL
126389	2002 BX_{1}	—	January 21, 2002	Desert Eagle	W. K. Y. Yeung	·	2.1 km	MPC · JPL
126390	2002 BZ_{1}	—	January 21, 2002	Desert Eagle	W. K. Y. Yeung	·	4.0 km	MPC · JPL
126391	2002 BW_{2}	—	January 18, 2002	Anderson Mesa	LONEOS	MAR	2.2 km	MPC · JPL
126392	2002 BD_{3}	—	January 18, 2002	Anderson Mesa	LONEOS	ADE	5.5 km	MPC · JPL
126393	2002 BF_{3}	—	January 18, 2002	Anderson Mesa	LONEOS	ADE	5.6 km	MPC · JPL
126394	2002 BL_{3}	—	January 20, 2002	Anderson Mesa	LONEOS	·	4.2 km	MPC · JPL
126395	2002 BG_{4}	—	January 19, 2002	Anderson Mesa	LONEOS	·	3.1 km	MPC · JPL
126396	2002 BV_{4}	—	January 19, 2002	Anderson Mesa	LONEOS	EUN	3.3 km	MPC · JPL
126397	2002 BY_{4}	—	January 19, 2002	Anderson Mesa	LONEOS	·	3.1 km	MPC · JPL
126398	2002 BP_{9}	—	January 18, 2002	Socorro	LINEAR	·	2.4 km	MPC · JPL
126399	2002 BW_{9}	—	January 18, 2002	Socorro	LINEAR	NYS	2.8 km	MPC · JPL
126400	2002 BX_{10}	—	January 18, 2002	Socorro	LINEAR	·	1.8 km	MPC · JPL

== 126401–126500 ==
back to top

Designation			Discovery			Properties		Ref
Permanent	Provisional	Named after	Date	Site	Discoverer(s)	Category	Diam.	Ref
126401	2002 BZ_{12}	—	January 18, 2002	Socorro	LINEAR	DOR	5.1 km	MPC · JPL
126402	2002 BD_{13}	—	January 18, 2002	Socorro	LINEAR	·	4.0 km	MPC · JPL
126403	2002 BO_{13}	—	January 18, 2002	Socorro	LINEAR	·	3.9 km	MPC · JPL
126404	2002 BK_{15}	—	January 19, 2002	Socorro	LINEAR	·	2.0 km	MPC · JPL
126405	2002 BO_{15}	—	January 19, 2002	Socorro	LINEAR	·	4.2 km	MPC · JPL
126406	2002 BG_{16}	—	January 19, 2002	Socorro	LINEAR	·	2.5 km	MPC · JPL
126407	2002 BO_{16}	—	January 19, 2002	Socorro	LINEAR	·	3.8 km	MPC · JPL
126408	2002 BX_{16}	—	January 19, 2002	Socorro	LINEAR	·	2.6 km	MPC · JPL
126409	2002 BK_{18}	—	January 21, 2002	Socorro	LINEAR	·	3.1 km	MPC · JPL
126410	2002 BU_{18}	—	January 21, 2002	Socorro	LINEAR	·	4.4 km	MPC · JPL
126411	2002 BY_{18}	—	January 21, 2002	Socorro	LINEAR	EUN	2.5 km	MPC · JPL
126412	2002 BQ_{19}	—	January 21, 2002	Palomar	NEAT	·	1.8 km	MPC · JPL
126413	2002 BU_{19}	—	January 22, 2002	Socorro	LINEAR	NYS	2.2 km	MPC · JPL
126414	2002 BD_{20}	—	January 22, 2002	Socorro	LINEAR	MAS	1.2 km	MPC · JPL
126415	2002 BZ_{23}	—	January 23, 2002	Socorro	LINEAR	EUN	2.4 km	MPC · JPL
126416	2002 BH_{25}	—	January 22, 2002	Palomar	NEAT	MAS	1.6 km	MPC · JPL
126417	2002 BB_{28}	—	January 20, 2002	Anderson Mesa	LONEOS	·	3.9 km	MPC · JPL
126418	2002 BD_{29}	—	January 20, 2002	Anderson Mesa	LONEOS	·	2.3 km	MPC · JPL
126419	2002 BH_{29}	—	January 20, 2002	Anderson Mesa	LONEOS	·	2.8 km	MPC · JPL
126420	2002 BK_{29}	—	January 20, 2002	Anderson Mesa	LONEOS	·	2.4 km	MPC · JPL
126421	2002 BD_{30}	—	January 21, 2002	Palomar	NEAT	·	3.7 km	MPC · JPL
126422	2002 BJ_{30}	—	January 21, 2002	Anderson Mesa	LONEOS	·	5.3 km	MPC · JPL
126423	2002 BE_{31}	—	January 19, 2002	Socorro	LINEAR	·	3.0 km	MPC · JPL
126424	2002 CR	—	February 2, 2002	Cima Ekar	ADAS	·	5.7 km	MPC · JPL
126425	2002 CW_{1}	—	February 3, 2002	Palomar	NEAT	·	2.6 km	MPC · JPL
126426	2002 CO_{2}	—	February 3, 2002	Palomar	NEAT	·	3.1 km	MPC · JPL
126427	2002 CV_{2}	—	February 3, 2002	Palomar	NEAT	·	4.5 km	MPC · JPL
126428	2002 CU_{4}	—	February 5, 2002	Fountain Hills	C. W. Juels, P. R. Holvorcem	·	4.7 km	MPC · JPL
126429	2002 CZ_{4}	—	February 3, 2002	Palomar	NEAT	·	3.5 km	MPC · JPL
126430	2002 CH_{5}	—	February 4, 2002	Palomar	NEAT	·	2.0 km	MPC · JPL
126431	2002 CK_{5}	—	February 4, 2002	Palomar	NEAT	·	3.6 km	MPC · JPL
126432	2002 CR_{5}	—	February 4, 2002	Haleakala	NEAT	KOR	2.6 km	MPC · JPL
126433	2002 CT_{7}	—	February 6, 2002	Desert Eagle	W. K. Y. Yeung	NYS	2.4 km	MPC · JPL
126434	2002 CM_{8}	—	February 5, 2002	Palomar	NEAT	NYS	1.4 km	MPC · JPL
126435	2002 CQ_{10}	—	February 6, 2002	Socorro	LINEAR	HNS	2.1 km	MPC · JPL
126436	2002 CC_{11}	—	February 6, 2002	Desert Eagle	W. K. Y. Yeung	NYS ·	3.6 km	MPC · JPL
126437	2002 CG_{11}	—	February 6, 2002	Desert Eagle	W. K. Y. Yeung	(5)	2.2 km	MPC · JPL
126438	2002 CB_{12}	—	February 6, 2002	Socorro	LINEAR	PHO	2.6 km	MPC · JPL
126439	2002 CP_{12}	—	February 4, 2002	Črni Vrh	Mikuž, H.	NYS	2.4 km	MPC · JPL
126440	2002 CP_{13}	—	February 8, 2002	Desert Eagle	W. K. Y. Yeung	·	4.8 km	MPC · JPL
126441	2002 CV_{14}	—	February 8, 2002	Desert Eagle	W. K. Y. Yeung	NYS	2.0 km	MPC · JPL
126442	2002 CJ_{15}	—	February 9, 2002	Desert Eagle	W. K. Y. Yeung	·	4.0 km	MPC · JPL
126443	2002 CV_{15}	—	February 8, 2002	Desert Eagle	W. K. Y. Yeung	NYS ·	3.9 km	MPC · JPL
126444 Wylie	2002 CF_{16}	Wylie	February 7, 2002	Kingsnake	J. V. McClusky	PHO	4.2 km	MPC · JPL
126445 Prestonreeves	2002 CH_{16}	Prestonreeves	February 7, 2002	Kingsnake	J. V. McClusky	·	2.1 km	MPC · JPL
126446	2002 CO_{16}	—	February 6, 2002	Socorro	LINEAR	·	2.1 km	MPC · JPL
126447	2002 CH_{18}	—	February 6, 2002	Socorro	LINEAR	·	3.9 km	MPC · JPL
126448	2002 CS_{19}	—	February 4, 2002	Palomar	NEAT	·	1.9 km	MPC · JPL
126449	2002 CH_{20}	—	February 4, 2002	Palomar	NEAT	·	2.1 km	MPC · JPL
126450	2002 CJ_{20}	—	February 4, 2002	Palomar	NEAT	·	4.0 km	MPC · JPL
126451	2002 CV_{20}	—	February 4, 2002	Palomar	NEAT	·	3.8 km	MPC · JPL
126452	2002 CC_{24}	—	February 6, 2002	Haleakala	NEAT	·	2.6 km	MPC · JPL
126453	2002 CO_{24}	—	February 6, 2002	Haleakala	NEAT	·	2.0 km	MPC · JPL
126454	2002 CK_{26}	—	February 6, 2002	Socorro	LINEAR	PHO	3.2 km	MPC · JPL
126455	2002 CO_{27}	—	February 6, 2002	Socorro	LINEAR	·	3.5 km	MPC · JPL
126456	2002 CK_{28}	—	February 6, 2002	Socorro	LINEAR	·	3.8 km	MPC · JPL
126457	2002 CQ_{28}	—	February 6, 2002	Socorro	LINEAR	(16286)	3.4 km	MPC · JPL
126458	2002 CW_{29}	—	February 6, 2002	Socorro	LINEAR	·	2.7 km	MPC · JPL
126459	2002 CX_{30}	—	February 6, 2002	Socorro	LINEAR	·	2.4 km	MPC · JPL
126460	2002 CM_{32}	—	February 6, 2002	Socorro	LINEAR	·	1.7 km	MPC · JPL
126461	2002 CD_{33}	—	February 6, 2002	Socorro	LINEAR	·	2.5 km	MPC · JPL
126462	2002 CP_{35}	—	February 7, 2002	Socorro	LINEAR	·	2.4 km	MPC · JPL
126463	2002 CW_{37}	—	February 7, 2002	Socorro	LINEAR	·	4.6 km	MPC · JPL
126464	2002 CE_{38}	—	February 7, 2002	Socorro	LINEAR	·	2.5 km	MPC · JPL
126465	2002 CV_{38}	—	February 7, 2002	Socorro	LINEAR	KOR	2.4 km	MPC · JPL
126466	2002 CA_{39}	—	February 7, 2002	Socorro	LINEAR	·	2.1 km	MPC · JPL
126467	2002 CZ_{39}	—	February 5, 2002	Haleakala	NEAT	·	2.2 km	MPC · JPL
126468	2002 CB_{40}	—	February 5, 2002	Haleakala	NEAT	·	8.7 km	MPC · JPL
126469	2002 CB_{41}	—	February 7, 2002	Palomar	NEAT	·	8.9 km	MPC · JPL
126470	2002 CL_{41}	—	February 7, 2002	Palomar	NEAT	JUN	1.4 km	MPC · JPL
126471	2002 CA_{42}	—	February 7, 2002	Haleakala	NEAT	JUN	1.6 km	MPC · JPL
126472	2002 CF_{42}	—	February 7, 2002	Palomar	NEAT	·	3.5 km	MPC · JPL
126473	2002 CA_{43}	—	February 12, 2002	Fountain Hills	C. W. Juels, P. R. Holvorcem	·	4.0 km	MPC · JPL
126474	2002 CM_{43}	—	February 11, 2002	Desert Eagle	W. K. Y. Yeung	THM	7.3 km	MPC · JPL
126475	2002 CE_{45}	—	February 8, 2002	Kitt Peak	Spacewatch	·	1.8 km	MPC · JPL
126476	2002 CO_{47}	—	February 3, 2002	Haleakala	NEAT	·	3.8 km	MPC · JPL
126477	2002 CB_{48}	—	February 3, 2002	Haleakala	NEAT	·	2.0 km	MPC · JPL
126478	2002 CH_{48}	—	February 3, 2002	Haleakala	NEAT	ADE	5.6 km	MPC · JPL
126479	2002 CJ_{48}	—	February 3, 2002	Haleakala	NEAT	EUN	2.6 km	MPC · JPL
126480	2002 CD_{49}	—	February 3, 2002	Haleakala	NEAT	KOR	2.3 km	MPC · JPL
126481	2002 CU_{49}	—	February 3, 2002	Haleakala	NEAT	·	3.7 km	MPC · JPL
126482	2002 CB_{51}	—	February 12, 2002	Desert Eagle	W. K. Y. Yeung	·	2.4 km	MPC · JPL
126483	2002 CC_{51}	—	February 12, 2002	Desert Eagle	W. K. Y. Yeung	·	2.4 km	MPC · JPL
126484	2002 CU_{51}	—	February 12, 2002	Desert Eagle	W. K. Y. Yeung	·	2.4 km	MPC · JPL
126485	2002 CA_{53}	—	February 7, 2002	Socorro	LINEAR	EOS	4.1 km	MPC · JPL
126486	2002 CS_{53}	—	February 7, 2002	Socorro	LINEAR	NYS	2.6 km	MPC · JPL
126487	2002 CE_{54}	—	February 7, 2002	Socorro	LINEAR	·	1.9 km	MPC · JPL
126488	2002 CD_{55}	—	February 7, 2002	Socorro	LINEAR	·	2.2 km	MPC · JPL
126489	2002 CS_{55}	—	February 7, 2002	Socorro	LINEAR	NYS	2.5 km	MPC · JPL
126490	2002 CB_{56}	—	February 7, 2002	Socorro	LINEAR	MAR	2.0 km	MPC · JPL
126491	2002 CC_{56}	—	February 7, 2002	Socorro	LINEAR	·	2.2 km	MPC · JPL
126492	2002 CQ_{56}	—	February 7, 2002	Socorro	LINEAR	·	5.7 km	MPC · JPL
126493	2002 CB_{57}	—	February 7, 2002	Socorro	LINEAR	NYS	1.9 km	MPC · JPL
126494	2002 CG_{57}	—	February 7, 2002	Socorro	LINEAR	AGN	2.2 km	MPC · JPL
126495	2002 CO_{57}	—	February 7, 2002	Socorro	LINEAR	KOR	2.8 km	MPC · JPL
126496	2002 CM_{59}	—	February 12, 2002	Desert Eagle	W. K. Y. Yeung	·	3.5 km	MPC · JPL
126497	2002 CQ_{59}	—	February 13, 2002	Desert Eagle	W. K. Y. Yeung	·	2.6 km	MPC · JPL
126498	2002 CK_{61}	—	February 6, 2002	Socorro	LINEAR	MAR	2.3 km	MPC · JPL
126499	2002 CX_{61}	—	February 6, 2002	Socorro	LINEAR	EOS	4.8 km	MPC · JPL
126500	2002 CA_{62}	—	February 6, 2002	Socorro	LINEAR	·	2.5 km	MPC · JPL

== 126501–126600 ==
back to top

Designation			Discovery			Properties		Ref
Permanent	Provisional	Named after	Date	Site	Discoverer(s)	Category	Diam.	Ref
126501	2002 CT_{62}	—	February 6, 2002	Socorro	LINEAR	·	3.5 km	MPC · JPL
126502	2002 CZ_{62}	—	February 6, 2002	Socorro	LINEAR	·	2.0 km	MPC · JPL
126503	2002 CE_{63}	—	February 6, 2002	Socorro	LINEAR	·	3.1 km	MPC · JPL
126504	2002 CU_{63}	—	February 6, 2002	Socorro	LINEAR	EOS	3.6 km	MPC · JPL
126505	2002 CA_{64}	—	February 6, 2002	Socorro	LINEAR	EUN	2.9 km	MPC · JPL
126506	2002 CC_{64}	—	February 6, 2002	Socorro	LINEAR	·	3.0 km	MPC · JPL
126507	2002 CU_{64}	—	February 6, 2002	Socorro	LINEAR	·	3.1 km	MPC · JPL
126508	2002 CQ_{67}	—	February 7, 2002	Socorro	LINEAR	·	3.9 km	MPC · JPL
126509	2002 CA_{69}	—	February 7, 2002	Socorro	LINEAR	·	1.9 km	MPC · JPL
126510	2002 CN_{69}	—	February 7, 2002	Socorro	LINEAR	NYS	2.1 km	MPC · JPL
126511	2002 CM_{70}	—	February 7, 2002	Socorro	LINEAR	·	1.5 km	MPC · JPL
126512	2002 CB_{71}	—	February 7, 2002	Socorro	LINEAR	·	2.7 km	MPC · JPL
126513	2002 CY_{71}	—	February 7, 2002	Socorro	LINEAR	·	3.2 km	MPC · JPL
126514	2002 CK_{74}	—	February 7, 2002	Socorro	LINEAR	·	6.6 km	MPC · JPL
126515	2002 CY_{75}	—	February 7, 2002	Socorro	LINEAR	·	2.8 km	MPC · JPL
126516	2002 CB_{77}	—	February 7, 2002	Socorro	LINEAR	·	2.6 km	MPC · JPL
126517	2002 CJ_{77}	—	February 7, 2002	Socorro	LINEAR	KOR	2.8 km	MPC · JPL
126518	2002 CE_{78}	—	February 7, 2002	Socorro	LINEAR	·	2.5 km	MPC · JPL
126519	2002 CO_{78}	—	February 7, 2002	Socorro	LINEAR	·	2.9 km	MPC · JPL
126520	2002 CT_{78}	—	February 7, 2002	Socorro	LINEAR	·	2.5 km	MPC · JPL
126521	2002 CP_{80}	—	February 7, 2002	Socorro	LINEAR	EOS	3.6 km	MPC · JPL
126522	2002 CK_{81}	—	February 7, 2002	Socorro	LINEAR	·	1.6 km	MPC · JPL
126523	2002 CM_{81}	—	February 7, 2002	Socorro	LINEAR	·	1.6 km	MPC · JPL
126524	2002 CZ_{81}	—	February 7, 2002	Socorro	LINEAR	·	2.0 km	MPC · JPL
126525	2002 CB_{82}	—	February 7, 2002	Socorro	LINEAR	·	2.9 km	MPC · JPL
126526	2002 CJ_{82}	—	February 7, 2002	Socorro	LINEAR	·	2.3 km	MPC · JPL
126527	2002 CA_{83}	—	February 7, 2002	Socorro	LINEAR	NYS	2.0 km	MPC · JPL
126528	2002 CN_{83}	—	February 7, 2002	Socorro	LINEAR	·	3.1 km	MPC · JPL
126529	2002 CT_{83}	—	February 7, 2002	Socorro	LINEAR	·	1.7 km	MPC · JPL
126530	2002 CC_{84}	—	February 7, 2002	Socorro	LINEAR	·	3.1 km	MPC · JPL
126531	2002 CZ_{84}	—	February 7, 2002	Socorro	LINEAR	·	1.9 km	MPC · JPL
126532	2002 CO_{86}	—	February 7, 2002	Socorro	LINEAR	AGN	1.8 km	MPC · JPL
126533	2002 CQ_{86}	—	February 7, 2002	Socorro	LINEAR	·	2.3 km	MPC · JPL
126534	2002 CT_{86}	—	February 7, 2002	Socorro	LINEAR	·	2.0 km	MPC · JPL
126535	2002 CX_{86}	—	February 7, 2002	Socorro	LINEAR	·	2.3 km	MPC · JPL
126536	2002 CU_{88}	—	February 7, 2002	Socorro	LINEAR	NYS	2.3 km	MPC · JPL
126537	2002 CW_{89}	—	February 7, 2002	Socorro	LINEAR	·	2.5 km	MPC · JPL
126538	2002 CJ_{90}	—	February 7, 2002	Socorro	LINEAR	·	6.6 km	MPC · JPL
126539	2002 CU_{90}	—	February 7, 2002	Socorro	LINEAR	·	2.4 km	MPC · JPL
126540	2002 CV_{91}	—	February 7, 2002	Socorro	LINEAR	·	1.9 km	MPC · JPL
126541	2002 CC_{92}	—	February 7, 2002	Socorro	LINEAR	·	5.3 km	MPC · JPL
126542	2002 CR_{92}	—	February 7, 2002	Socorro	LINEAR	(12739)	3.2 km	MPC · JPL
126543	2002 CX_{92}	—	February 7, 2002	Socorro	LINEAR	NYS	1.6 km	MPC · JPL
126544	2002 CU_{93}	—	February 7, 2002	Socorro	LINEAR	·	1.8 km	MPC · JPL
126545	2002 CV_{93}	—	February 7, 2002	Socorro	LINEAR	·	1.8 km	MPC · JPL
126546	2002 CX_{93}	—	February 7, 2002	Socorro	LINEAR	·	3.1 km	MPC · JPL
126547	2002 CL_{94}	—	February 7, 2002	Socorro	LINEAR	·	4.8 km	MPC · JPL
126548	2002 CB_{95}	—	February 7, 2002	Socorro	LINEAR	·	4.9 km	MPC · JPL
126549	2002 CF_{95}	—	February 7, 2002	Socorro	LINEAR	MAS	1.7 km	MPC · JPL
126550	2002 CJ_{98}	—	February 7, 2002	Socorro	LINEAR	EOS	3.7 km	MPC · JPL
126551	2002 CM_{98}	—	February 7, 2002	Socorro	LINEAR	·	2.9 km	MPC · JPL
126552	2002 CV_{98}	—	February 7, 2002	Socorro	LINEAR	·	2.8 km	MPC · JPL
126553	2002 CF_{99}	—	February 7, 2002	Socorro	LINEAR	·	2.7 km	MPC · JPL
126554	2002 CT_{101}	—	February 7, 2002	Socorro	LINEAR	·	5.0 km	MPC · JPL
126555	2002 CC_{102}	—	February 7, 2002	Socorro	LINEAR	NYS	1.9 km	MPC · JPL
126556	2002 CJ_{102}	—	February 7, 2002	Socorro	LINEAR	KOR	2.5 km	MPC · JPL
126557	2002 CT_{102}	—	February 7, 2002	Socorro	LINEAR	(21344)	3.2 km	MPC · JPL
126558	2002 CD_{104}	—	February 7, 2002	Socorro	LINEAR	·	4.8 km	MPC · JPL
126559	2002 CG_{104}	—	February 7, 2002	Socorro	LINEAR	THM	4.3 km	MPC · JPL
126560	2002 CD_{105}	—	February 7, 2002	Socorro	LINEAR	·	2.9 km	MPC · JPL
126561	2002 CF_{105}	—	February 7, 2002	Socorro	LINEAR	THM	7.0 km	MPC · JPL
126562	2002 CM_{105}	—	February 7, 2002	Socorro	LINEAR	·	2.1 km	MPC · JPL
126563	2002 CH_{106}	—	February 7, 2002	Socorro	LINEAR	·	4.6 km	MPC · JPL
126564	2002 CK_{106}	—	February 7, 2002	Socorro	LINEAR	·	3.3 km	MPC · JPL
126565	2002 CX_{106}	—	February 7, 2002	Socorro	LINEAR	·	3.5 km	MPC · JPL
126566	2002 CY_{106}	—	February 7, 2002	Socorro	LINEAR	·	3.6 km	MPC · JPL
126567	2002 CG_{107}	—	February 7, 2002	Socorro	LINEAR	·	1.9 km	MPC · JPL
126568	2002 CO_{107}	—	February 7, 2002	Socorro	LINEAR	·	5.4 km	MPC · JPL
126569	2002 CT_{107}	—	February 7, 2002	Socorro	LINEAR	HNS	1.8 km	MPC · JPL
126570	2002 CX_{108}	—	February 7, 2002	Socorro	LINEAR	·	1.6 km	MPC · JPL
126571	2002 CN_{110}	—	February 7, 2002	Socorro	LINEAR	THM	4.3 km	MPC · JPL
126572	2002 CX_{110}	—	February 7, 2002	Socorro	LINEAR	EOS	3.2 km	MPC · JPL
126573	2002 CF_{111}	—	February 7, 2002	Socorro	LINEAR	·	4.5 km	MPC · JPL
126574	2002 CM_{112}	—	February 7, 2002	Socorro	LINEAR	·	3.4 km	MPC · JPL
126575	2002 CA_{113}	—	February 8, 2002	Socorro	LINEAR	·	2.5 km	MPC · JPL
126576	2002 CA_{114}	—	February 8, 2002	Socorro	LINEAR	·	2.4 km	MPC · JPL
126577	2002 CR_{114}	—	February 8, 2002	Socorro	LINEAR	MAR	2.6 km	MPC · JPL
126578 Suhhosoo	2002 CK_{116}	Suhhosoo	February 11, 2002	Bohyunsan	Jeon, Y.-B.	KOR	2.7 km	MPC · JPL
126579	2002 CE_{119}	—	February 7, 2002	Socorro	LINEAR	·	4.0 km	MPC · JPL
126580	2002 CH_{119}	—	February 7, 2002	Socorro	LINEAR	MAS	1.4 km	MPC · JPL
126581	2002 CZ_{119}	—	February 7, 2002	Socorro	LINEAR	·	1.7 km	MPC · JPL
126582	2002 CZ_{122}	—	February 7, 2002	Socorro	LINEAR	·	3.2 km	MPC · JPL
126583	2002 CZ_{123}	—	February 7, 2002	Socorro	LINEAR	MAS	1.3 km	MPC · JPL
126584	2002 CV_{125}	—	February 7, 2002	Socorro	LINEAR	·	4.6 km	MPC · JPL
126585	2002 CY_{125}	—	February 7, 2002	Socorro	LINEAR	·	2.1 km	MPC · JPL
126586	2002 CV_{127}	—	February 7, 2002	Socorro	LINEAR	NYS ·	2.8 km	MPC · JPL
126587	2002 CX_{127}	—	February 7, 2002	Socorro	LINEAR	·	3.2 km	MPC · JPL
126588	2002 CF_{128}	—	February 7, 2002	Socorro	LINEAR	MAS	1.1 km	MPC · JPL
126589	2002 CG_{128}	—	February 7, 2002	Socorro	LINEAR	·	2.0 km	MPC · JPL
126590	2002 CJ_{128}	—	February 7, 2002	Socorro	LINEAR	·	1.8 km	MPC · JPL
126591	2002 CT_{128}	—	February 7, 2002	Socorro	LINEAR	·	2.7 km	MPC · JPL
126592	2002 CU_{128}	—	February 7, 2002	Socorro	LINEAR	·	3.5 km	MPC · JPL
126593	2002 CC_{129}	—	February 7, 2002	Socorro	LINEAR	V	1.1 km	MPC · JPL
126594	2002 CD_{129}	—	February 7, 2002	Socorro	LINEAR	·	2.4 km	MPC · JPL
126595	2002 CM_{129}	—	February 7, 2002	Socorro	LINEAR	·	3.2 km	MPC · JPL
126596	2002 CO_{129}	—	February 7, 2002	Socorro	LINEAR	HOF	5.0 km	MPC · JPL
126597	2002 CM_{132}	—	February 7, 2002	Socorro	LINEAR	·	2.0 km	MPC · JPL
126598	2002 CC_{134}	—	February 7, 2002	Socorro	LINEAR	·	3.4 km	MPC · JPL
126599	2002 CU_{134}	—	February 7, 2002	Socorro	LINEAR	·	3.5 km	MPC · JPL
126600	2002 CA_{136}	—	February 8, 2002	Socorro	LINEAR	·	3.5 km	MPC · JPL

== 126601–126700 ==
back to top

Designation			Discovery			Properties		Ref
Permanent	Provisional	Named after	Date	Site	Discoverer(s)	Category	Diam.	Ref
126601	2002 CB_{136}	—	February 8, 2002	Socorro	LINEAR	V	1.3 km	MPC · JPL
126602	2002 CD_{136}	—	February 8, 2002	Socorro	LINEAR	·	2.5 km	MPC · JPL
126603	2002 CP_{136}	—	February 8, 2002	Socorro	LINEAR	(2076)	1.5 km	MPC · JPL
126604	2002 CW_{137}	—	February 8, 2002	Socorro	LINEAR	·	4.6 km	MPC · JPL
126605	2002 CT_{140}	—	February 8, 2002	Socorro	LINEAR	MRX	1.8 km	MPC · JPL
126606	2002 CS_{141}	—	February 8, 2002	Socorro	LINEAR	·	5.2 km	MPC · JPL
126607	2002 CM_{143}	—	February 9, 2002	Socorro	LINEAR	HOF	4.0 km	MPC · JPL
126608	2002 CW_{143}	—	February 9, 2002	Socorro	LINEAR	·	1.8 km	MPC · JPL
126609	2002 CB_{144}	—	February 9, 2002	Socorro	LINEAR	(5)	2.3 km	MPC · JPL
126610	2002 CS_{144}	—	February 9, 2002	Socorro	LINEAR	·	2.8 km	MPC · JPL
126611	2002 CQ_{145}	—	February 9, 2002	Socorro	LINEAR	·	1.8 km	MPC · JPL
126612	2002 CW_{145}	—	February 9, 2002	Socorro	LINEAR	·	3.7 km	MPC · JPL
126613	2002 CT_{147}	—	February 10, 2002	Socorro	LINEAR	·	1.8 km	MPC · JPL
126614	2002 CE_{148}	—	February 10, 2002	Socorro	LINEAR	AGN	2.1 km	MPC · JPL
126615	2002 CR_{148}	—	February 10, 2002	Socorro	LINEAR	·	2.3 km	MPC · JPL
126616	2002 CF_{149}	—	February 10, 2002	Socorro	LINEAR	·	3.5 km	MPC · JPL
126617	2002 CW_{151}	—	February 10, 2002	Socorro	LINEAR	·	3.5 km	MPC · JPL
126618	2002 CA_{154}	—	February 9, 2002	Kitt Peak	Spacewatch	·	3.3 km	MPC · JPL
126619	2002 CX_{154}	—	February 6, 2002	Kitt Peak	M. W. Buie	SDO	127 km	MPC · JPL
126620	2002 CM_{155}	—	February 6, 2002	Socorro	LINEAR	EUN	3.1 km	MPC · JPL
126621	2002 CA_{157}	—	February 7, 2002	Socorro	LINEAR	·	4.3 km	MPC · JPL
126622	2002 CO_{158}	—	February 7, 2002	Socorro	LINEAR	NYS	2.0 km	MPC · JPL
126623	2002 CJ_{160}	—	February 8, 2002	Socorro	LINEAR	·	2.8 km	MPC · JPL
126624	2002 CK_{162}	—	February 8, 2002	Socorro	LINEAR	·	2.3 km	MPC · JPL
126625	2002 CG_{163}	—	February 8, 2002	Socorro	LINEAR	·	2.9 km	MPC · JPL
126626	2002 CN_{163}	—	February 8, 2002	Socorro	LINEAR	·	1.8 km	MPC · JPL
126627	2002 CQ_{163}	—	February 8, 2002	Socorro	LINEAR	·	2.3 km	MPC · JPL
126628	2002 CS_{163}	—	February 8, 2002	Socorro	LINEAR	·	2.8 km	MPC · JPL
126629	2002 CK_{164}	—	February 8, 2002	Socorro	LINEAR	·	2.1 km	MPC · JPL
126630	2002 CM_{164}	—	February 8, 2002	Socorro	LINEAR	AGN	2.2 km	MPC · JPL
126631	2002 CO_{164}	—	February 8, 2002	Socorro	LINEAR	·	3.2 km	MPC · JPL
126632	2002 CW_{164}	—	February 8, 2002	Socorro	LINEAR	(5)	1.5 km	MPC · JPL
126633	2002 CE_{165}	—	February 8, 2002	Socorro	LINEAR	·	3.9 km	MPC · JPL
126634	2002 CB_{167}	—	February 8, 2002	Socorro	LINEAR	·	2.6 km	MPC · JPL
126635	2002 CM_{169}	—	February 8, 2002	Socorro	LINEAR	·	2.4 km	MPC · JPL
126636	2002 CL_{170}	—	February 8, 2002	Socorro	LINEAR	·	2.5 km	MPC · JPL
126637	2002 CM_{170}	—	February 8, 2002	Socorro	LINEAR	(5)	2.0 km	MPC · JPL
126638	2002 CW_{173}	—	February 8, 2002	Socorro	LINEAR	EUN	2.0 km	MPC · JPL
126639	2002 CG_{174}	—	February 8, 2002	Socorro	LINEAR	·	3.2 km	MPC · JPL
126640	2002 CJ_{174}	—	February 8, 2002	Socorro	LINEAR	EUN	2.2 km	MPC · JPL
126641	2002 CK_{174}	—	February 8, 2002	Socorro	LINEAR	·	7.5 km	MPC · JPL
126642	2002 CA_{176}	—	February 10, 2002	Socorro	LINEAR	NYS ·	3.5 km	MPC · JPL
126643	2002 CJ_{176}	—	February 10, 2002	Socorro	LINEAR	NYS	2.3 km	MPC · JPL
126644	2002 CU_{176}	—	February 10, 2002	Socorro	LINEAR	·	5.0 km	MPC · JPL
126645	2002 CA_{178}	—	February 10, 2002	Socorro	LINEAR	·	2.6 km	MPC · JPL
126646	2002 CN_{179}	—	February 10, 2002	Socorro	LINEAR	·	2.4 km	MPC · JPL
126647	2002 CR_{182}	—	February 10, 2002	Socorro	LINEAR	KOR	1.8 km	MPC · JPL
126648	2002 CV_{193}	—	February 10, 2002	Socorro	LINEAR	·	4.8 km	MPC · JPL
126649	2002 CA_{195}	—	February 10, 2002	Socorro	LINEAR	HYG	5.8 km	MPC · JPL
126650	2002 CP_{197}	—	February 10, 2002	Socorro	LINEAR	KOR	2.4 km	MPC · JPL
126651	2002 CY_{198}	—	February 10, 2002	Socorro	LINEAR	KOR	2.7 km	MPC · JPL
126652	2002 CM_{199}	—	February 10, 2002	Socorro	LINEAR	·	2.3 km	MPC · JPL
126653	2002 CC_{201}	—	February 10, 2002	Socorro	LINEAR	·	2.9 km	MPC · JPL
126654	2002 CZ_{201}	—	February 10, 2002	Socorro	LINEAR	·	2.6 km	MPC · JPL
126655	2002 CT_{202}	—	February 10, 2002	Socorro	LINEAR	·	3.9 km	MPC · JPL
126656	2002 CY_{202}	—	February 10, 2002	Socorro	LINEAR	·	1.7 km	MPC · JPL
126657	2002 CZ_{202}	—	February 10, 2002	Socorro	LINEAR	·	2.7 km	MPC · JPL
126658	2002 CW_{203}	—	February 10, 2002	Socorro	LINEAR	·	3.7 km	MPC · JPL
126659	2002 CF_{205}	—	February 10, 2002	Socorro	LINEAR	(5)	2.3 km	MPC · JPL
126660	2002 CB_{206}	—	February 10, 2002	Socorro	LINEAR	·	4.1 km	MPC · JPL
126661	2002 CQ_{206}	—	February 10, 2002	Socorro	LINEAR	·	2.9 km	MPC · JPL
126662	2002 CG_{209}	—	February 10, 2002	Socorro	LINEAR	·	2.8 km	MPC · JPL
126663	2002 CK_{209}	—	February 10, 2002	Socorro	LINEAR	EUN	1.7 km	MPC · JPL
126664	2002 CV_{209}	—	February 10, 2002	Socorro	LINEAR	·	3.3 km	MPC · JPL
126665	2002 CD_{210}	—	February 10, 2002	Socorro	LINEAR	·	2.7 km	MPC · JPL
126666	2002 CO_{210}	—	February 10, 2002	Socorro	LINEAR	KOR	2.1 km	MPC · JPL
126667	2002 CQ_{212}	—	February 10, 2002	Socorro	LINEAR	AGN	2.0 km	MPC · JPL
126668	2002 CR_{212}	—	February 10, 2002	Socorro	LINEAR	·	2.8 km	MPC · JPL
126669	2002 CV_{212}	—	February 10, 2002	Socorro	LINEAR	THM	5.6 km	MPC · JPL
126670	2002 CK_{214}	—	February 10, 2002	Socorro	LINEAR	·	2.8 km	MPC · JPL
126671	2002 CJ_{215}	—	February 10, 2002	Socorro	LINEAR	·	1.7 km	MPC · JPL
126672	2002 CL_{215}	—	February 10, 2002	Socorro	LINEAR	fast	1.7 km	MPC · JPL
126673	2002 CG_{216}	—	February 10, 2002	Socorro	LINEAR	·	3.2 km	MPC · JPL
126674	2002 CR_{216}	—	February 10, 2002	Socorro	LINEAR	·	2.8 km	MPC · JPL
126675	2002 CW_{217}	—	February 10, 2002	Socorro	LINEAR	THM	6.7 km	MPC · JPL
126676	2002 CD_{218}	—	February 10, 2002	Socorro	LINEAR	THM	5.3 km	MPC · JPL
126677	2002 CO_{218}	—	February 10, 2002	Socorro	LINEAR	KOR	2.8 km	MPC · JPL
126678	2002 CS_{218}	—	February 10, 2002	Socorro	LINEAR	KOR	2.4 km	MPC · JPL
126679	2002 CX_{218}	—	February 10, 2002	Socorro	LINEAR	KOR	3.1 km	MPC · JPL
126680	2002 CD_{219}	—	February 10, 2002	Socorro	LINEAR	·	2.0 km	MPC · JPL
126681	2002 CP_{219}	—	February 10, 2002	Socorro	LINEAR	·	3.2 km	MPC · JPL
126682	2002 CZ_{219}	—	February 10, 2002	Socorro	LINEAR	KOR	2.9 km	MPC · JPL
126683	2002 CW_{220}	—	February 10, 2002	Socorro	LINEAR	·	2.7 km	MPC · JPL
126684	2002 CZ_{220}	—	February 10, 2002	Socorro	LINEAR	NYS	3.4 km	MPC · JPL
126685	2002 CT_{221}	—	February 10, 2002	Socorro	LINEAR	·	2.2 km	MPC · JPL
126686	2002 CC_{222}	—	February 11, 2002	Socorro	LINEAR	·	2.9 km	MPC · JPL
126687	2002 CH_{222}	—	February 11, 2002	Socorro	LINEAR	MAS	1.6 km	MPC · JPL
126688	2002 CW_{222}	—	February 11, 2002	Socorro	LINEAR	(5)	2.4 km	MPC · JPL
126689	2002 CO_{224}	—	February 11, 2002	Socorro	LINEAR	·	3.4 km	MPC · JPL
126690	2002 CQ_{225}	—	February 4, 2002	Haleakala	NEAT	·	2.7 km	MPC · JPL
126691	2002 CW_{225}	—	February 3, 2002	Haleakala	NEAT	·	2.9 km	MPC · JPL
126692	2002 CK_{227}	—	February 6, 2002	Palomar	NEAT	·	1.9 km	MPC · JPL
126693	2002 CZ_{227}	—	February 6, 2002	Palomar	NEAT	·	1.6 km	MPC · JPL
126694	2002 CO_{228}	—	February 6, 2002	Palomar	NEAT	·	2.8 km	MPC · JPL
126695	2002 CS_{228}	—	February 6, 2002	Palomar	NEAT	·	3.5 km	MPC · JPL
126696	2002 CJ_{229}	—	February 8, 2002	Kitt Peak	Spacewatch	·	3.2 km	MPC · JPL
126697	2002 CW_{229}	—	February 10, 2002	Kitt Peak	Spacewatch	KOR	2.5 km	MPC · JPL
126698	2002 CJ_{232}	—	February 8, 2002	Socorro	LINEAR	·	2.8 km	MPC · JPL
126699	2002 CM_{232}	—	February 10, 2002	Socorro	LINEAR	NYS	2.3 km	MPC · JPL
126700	2002 CU_{232}	—	February 10, 2002	Socorro	LINEAR	GEF	2.2 km	MPC · JPL

== 126701–126800 ==
back to top

Designation			Discovery			Properties		Ref
Permanent	Provisional	Named after	Date	Site	Discoverer(s)	Category	Diam.	Ref
126701	2002 CL_{233}	—	February 11, 2002	Socorro	LINEAR	·	3.1 km	MPC · JPL
126702	2002 CV_{233}	—	February 11, 2002	Socorro	LINEAR	·	4.0 km	MPC · JPL
126703	2002 CO_{239}	—	February 11, 2002	Socorro	LINEAR	·	2.8 km	MPC · JPL
126704	2002 CV_{239}	—	February 11, 2002	Socorro	LINEAR	RAF	1.6 km	MPC · JPL
126705	2002 CH_{240}	—	February 11, 2002	Socorro	LINEAR	·	3.2 km	MPC · JPL
126706	2002 CT_{240}	—	February 11, 2002	Socorro	LINEAR	·	3.8 km	MPC · JPL
126707	2002 CQ_{241}	—	February 11, 2002	Socorro	LINEAR	·	2.7 km	MPC · JPL
126708	2002 CU_{241}	—	February 11, 2002	Socorro	LINEAR	·	2.9 km	MPC · JPL
126709	2002 CB_{242}	—	February 11, 2002	Socorro	LINEAR	MRX	1.6 km	MPC · JPL
126710	2002 CO_{242}	—	February 11, 2002	Socorro	LINEAR	EOS	3.9 km	MPC · JPL
126711	2002 CZ_{242}	—	February 11, 2002	Socorro	LINEAR	EOS	2.9 km	MPC · JPL
126712	2002 CE_{243}	—	February 11, 2002	Socorro	LINEAR	(13314)	3.0 km	MPC · JPL
126713	2002 CX_{243}	—	February 11, 2002	Socorro	LINEAR	AGN	3.3 km	MPC · JPL
126714	2002 CU_{244}	—	February 11, 2002	Socorro	LINEAR	·	5.0 km	MPC · JPL
126715	2002 CS_{245}	—	February 15, 2002	Kitt Peak	Spacewatch	·	2.3 km	MPC · JPL
126716	2002 CF_{247}	—	February 15, 2002	Socorro	LINEAR	·	2.5 km	MPC · JPL
126717	2002 CZ_{247}	—	February 15, 2002	Socorro	LINEAR	THM	8.4 km	MPC · JPL
126718	2002 CK_{248}	—	February 15, 2002	Socorro	LINEAR	·	2.2 km	MPC · JPL
126719	2002 CC_{249}	—	February 8, 2002	Kitt Peak	M. W. Buie	cubewano (cold)	162 km	MPC · JPL
126720	2002 CK_{251}	—	February 2, 2002	Palomar	NEAT	·	3.8 km	MPC · JPL
126721	2002 CR_{251}	—	February 3, 2002	Palomar	NEAT	·	1.4 km	MPC · JPL
126722	2002 CG_{254}	—	February 5, 2002	Anderson Mesa	LONEOS	EOS ·	4.1 km	MPC · JPL
126723	2002 CP_{255}	—	February 6, 2002	Anderson Mesa	LONEOS	·	4.2 km	MPC · JPL
126724	2002 CB_{263}	—	February 6, 2002	Socorro	LINEAR	EUN	2.5 km	MPC · JPL
126725	2002 CH_{263}	—	February 6, 2002	Socorro	LINEAR	T_{j} (2.99) · EUP	10 km	MPC · JPL
126726	2002 CJ_{263}	—	February 6, 2002	Socorro	LINEAR	(194)	2.9 km	MPC · JPL
126727	2002 CK_{263}	—	February 6, 2002	Socorro	LINEAR	EUN	1.9 km	MPC · JPL
126728	2002 CX_{267}	—	February 7, 2002	Anderson Mesa	LONEOS	EUN	2.2 km	MPC · JPL
126729	2002 CN_{268}	—	February 7, 2002	Anderson Mesa	LONEOS	·	2.1 km	MPC · JPL
126730	2002 CL_{270}	—	February 7, 2002	Kitt Peak	Spacewatch	·	3.8 km	MPC · JPL
126731	2002 CT_{272}	—	February 8, 2002	Anderson Mesa	LONEOS	·	2.3 km	MPC · JPL
126732	2002 CW_{272}	—	February 8, 2002	Anderson Mesa	LONEOS	·	5.2 km	MPC · JPL
126733	2002 CX_{272}	—	February 8, 2002	Anderson Mesa	LONEOS	BRG	3.2 km	MPC · JPL
126734	2002 CT_{282}	—	February 8, 2002	Kitt Peak	Spacewatch	KOR	2.2 km	MPC · JPL
126735	2002 CD_{283}	—	February 8, 2002	Kitt Peak	Spacewatch	PAD	2.2 km	MPC · JPL
126736	2002 CM_{283}	—	February 8, 2002	Kitt Peak	Spacewatch	·	4.2 km	MPC · JPL
126737	2002 CE_{287}	—	February 8, 2002	Socorro	LINEAR	·	3.5 km	MPC · JPL
126738	2002 CT_{288}	—	February 10, 2002	Socorro	LINEAR	·	2.1 km	MPC · JPL
126739	2002 CR_{291}	—	February 10, 2002	Socorro	LINEAR	EOS	3.3 km	MPC · JPL
126740	2002 CY_{296}	—	February 10, 2002	Socorro	LINEAR	·	5.4 km	MPC · JPL
126741	2002 CY_{299}	—	February 11, 2002	Socorro	LINEAR	HYG	4.8 km	MPC · JPL
126742	2002 CU_{304}	—	February 15, 2002	Socorro	LINEAR	EOS	3.3 km	MPC · JPL
126743	2002 CQ_{305}	—	February 3, 2002	Anderson Mesa	LONEOS	(5)	1.9 km	MPC · JPL
126744	2002 CW_{308}	—	February 10, 2002	Socorro	LINEAR	HYG	5.8 km	MPC · JPL
126745	2002 CN_{311}	—	February 11, 2002	Socorro	LINEAR	·	1.4 km	MPC · JPL
126746	2002 CO_{311}	—	February 11, 2002	Socorro	LINEAR	·	1.8 km	MPC · JPL
126747	2002 CS_{311}	—	February 11, 2002	Socorro	LINEAR	·	3.9 km	MPC · JPL
126748 Mariegerbet	2002 DP	Mariegerbet	February 16, 2002	Vicques	M. Ory	KOR	2.8 km	MPC · JPL
126749 Johnjones	2002 DQ_{1}	Johnjones	February 20, 2002	Desert Moon	Stevens, B. L.	·	2.6 km	MPC · JPL
126750	2002 DX_{1}	—	February 19, 2002	Socorro	LINEAR	·	5.7 km	MPC · JPL
126751	2002 DZ_{1}	—	February 19, 2002	Socorro	LINEAR	HNS	2.3 km	MPC · JPL
126752	2002 DR_{3}	—	February 17, 2002	Needville	Needville	EOS	4.1 km	MPC · JPL
126753	2002 DN_{5}	—	February 16, 2002	Haleakala	NEAT	·	4.9 km	MPC · JPL
126754	2002 DT_{6}	—	February 20, 2002	Kitt Peak	Spacewatch	·	5.5 km	MPC · JPL
126755	2002 DH_{7}	—	February 19, 2002	Socorro	LINEAR	EUN	2.5 km	MPC · JPL
126756	2002 DS_{7}	—	February 19, 2002	Socorro	LINEAR	·	3.2 km	MPC · JPL
126757	2002 DX_{7}	—	February 19, 2002	Socorro	LINEAR	EUN	2.0 km	MPC · JPL
126758	2002 DR_{9}	—	February 19, 2002	Socorro	LINEAR	MAR	2.3 km	MPC · JPL
126759	2002 DT_{9}	—	February 19, 2002	Socorro	LINEAR	·	2.4 km	MPC · JPL
126760	2002 DS_{10}	—	February 20, 2002	Socorro	LINEAR	(5)	1.9 km	MPC · JPL
126761	2002 DW_{10}	—	February 19, 2002	Socorro	LINEAR	(194)	2.3 km	MPC · JPL
126762	2002 DC_{11}	—	February 19, 2002	Socorro	LINEAR	GAL	2.7 km	MPC · JPL
126763	2002 DN_{11}	—	February 20, 2002	Socorro	LINEAR	·	2.9 km	MPC · JPL
126764	2002 DB_{12}	—	February 20, 2002	Kitt Peak	Spacewatch	·	1.5 km	MPC · JPL
126765	2002 DF_{12}	—	February 21, 2002	Kitt Peak	Spacewatch	·	1.6 km	MPC · JPL
126766	2002 DJ_{12}	—	February 21, 2002	Palomar	NEAT	·	4.6 km	MPC · JPL
126767	2002 DM_{12}	—	February 22, 2002	Palomar	NEAT	·	2.4 km	MPC · JPL
126768	2002 DC_{13}	—	February 24, 2002	Palomar	NEAT	·	3.2 km	MPC · JPL
126769	2002 DE_{13}	—	February 24, 2002	Palomar	NEAT	·	4.4 km	MPC · JPL
126770	2002 DY_{14}	—	February 16, 2002	Palomar	NEAT	·	1.9 km	MPC · JPL
126771	2002 DU_{15}	—	February 16, 2002	Palomar	NEAT	·	2.9 km	MPC · JPL
126772	2002 DE_{16}	—	February 19, 2002	Kitt Peak	Spacewatch	·	3.0 km	MPC · JPL
126773	2002 DG_{16}	—	February 19, 2002	Socorro	LINEAR	·	4.1 km	MPC · JPL
126774	2002 DA_{17}	—	February 20, 2002	Anderson Mesa	LONEOS	·	5.7 km	MPC · JPL
126775	2002 DU_{17}	—	February 20, 2002	Socorro	LINEAR	·	1.9 km	MPC · JPL
126776	2002 EJ_{3}	—	March 7, 2002	Cima Ekar	ADAS	KOR	2.5 km	MPC · JPL
126777	2002 EN_{3}	—	March 7, 2002	Cima Ekar	ADAS	·	2.9 km	MPC · JPL
126778	2002 EV_{3}	—	March 10, 2002	Cima Ekar	ADAS	·	1.6 km	MPC · JPL
126779	2002 EC_{6}	—	March 10, 2002	Nashville	Clingan, R.	·	6.5 km	MPC · JPL
126780 Ivovasiljev	2002 EP_{7}	Ivovasiljev	March 10, 2002	Kleť	KLENOT	·	4.1 km	MPC · JPL
126781	2002 EA_{11}	—	March 13, 2002	Črni Vrh	Skvarč, J.	NYS	2.4 km	MPC · JPL
126782	2002 ED_{12}	—	March 14, 2002	Desert Eagle	W. K. Y. Yeung	·	2.4 km	MPC · JPL
126783	2002 EF_{13}	—	March 4, 2002	Kitt Peak	Spacewatch	KOR	2.0 km	MPC · JPL
126784	2002 EQ_{14}	—	March 5, 2002	Kitt Peak	Spacewatch	·	2.6 km	MPC · JPL
126785	2002 EH_{15}	—	March 5, 2002	Palomar	NEAT	·	2.2 km	MPC · JPL
126786	2002 EN_{15}	—	March 5, 2002	Palomar	NEAT	MAS	1.3 km	MPC · JPL
126787	2002 EA_{19}	—	March 6, 2002	Palomar	NEAT	615	2.5 km	MPC · JPL
126788	2002 EH_{19}	—	March 9, 2002	Palomar	NEAT	·	2.8 km	MPC · JPL
126789	2002 EV_{19}	—	March 9, 2002	Socorro	LINEAR	·	2.7 km	MPC · JPL
126790	2002 EY_{19}	—	March 9, 2002	Socorro	LINEAR	NEM	3.8 km	MPC · JPL
126791	2002 EG_{20}	—	March 9, 2002	Socorro	LINEAR	MAS	1.4 km	MPC · JPL
126792	2002 EK_{21}	—	March 10, 2002	Haleakala	NEAT	MRX	2.1 km	MPC · JPL
126793	2002 EN_{21}	—	March 10, 2002	Haleakala	NEAT	·	1.7 km	MPC · JPL
126794	2002 EV_{22}	—	March 10, 2002	Haleakala	NEAT	·	2.3 km	MPC · JPL
126795	2002 EE_{24}	—	March 5, 2002	Kitt Peak	Spacewatch	·	4.1 km	MPC · JPL
126796	2002 EX_{24}	—	March 5, 2002	Kitt Peak	Spacewatch	·	1.7 km	MPC · JPL
126797	2002 EB_{26}	—	March 10, 2002	Anderson Mesa	LONEOS	·	2.0 km	MPC · JPL
126798	2002 EV_{26}	—	March 9, 2002	Kitt Peak	Spacewatch	·	2.2 km	MPC · JPL
126799	2002 EG_{27}	—	March 9, 2002	Socorro	LINEAR	KOR	2.4 km	MPC · JPL
126800	2002 EP_{27}	—	March 9, 2002	Socorro	LINEAR	EOS	3.0 km	MPC · JPL

== 126801–126900 ==
back to top

Designation			Discovery			Properties		Ref
Permanent	Provisional	Named after	Date	Site	Discoverer(s)	Category	Diam.	Ref
126801	2002 EC_{29}	—	March 9, 2002	Socorro	LINEAR	·	2.5 km	MPC · JPL
126802	2002 EE_{29}	—	March 9, 2002	Socorro	LINEAR	·	2.9 km	MPC · JPL
126803	2002 EV_{29}	—	March 9, 2002	Socorro	LINEAR	·	2.5 km	MPC · JPL
126804	2002 EA_{30}	—	March 9, 2002	Socorro	LINEAR	·	4.2 km	MPC · JPL
126805	2002 EN_{35}	—	March 9, 2002	Kitt Peak	Spacewatch	·	3.0 km	MPC · JPL
126806	2002 ED_{39}	—	March 12, 2002	Kitt Peak	Spacewatch	KOR	2.5 km	MPC · JPL
126807	2002 ES_{39}	—	March 9, 2002	Socorro	LINEAR	·	6.5 km	MPC · JPL
126808	2002 ED_{40}	—	March 9, 2002	Socorro	LINEAR	AGN	2.6 km	MPC · JPL
126809	2002 EW_{40}	—	March 9, 2002	Socorro	LINEAR	·	3.4 km	MPC · JPL
126810	2002 EC_{41}	—	March 10, 2002	Socorro	LINEAR	·	1.7 km	MPC · JPL
126811	2002 ET_{42}	—	March 12, 2002	Socorro	LINEAR	·	3.6 km	MPC · JPL
126812	2002 EQ_{43}	—	March 12, 2002	Socorro	LINEAR	·	3.8 km	MPC · JPL
126813	2002 EA_{44}	—	March 12, 2002	Socorro	LINEAR	·	1.7 km	MPC · JPL
126814	2002 EE_{44}	—	March 12, 2002	Socorro	LINEAR	DOR	4.8 km	MPC · JPL
126815	2002 EE_{45}	—	March 10, 2002	Haleakala	NEAT	·	3.7 km	MPC · JPL
126816	2002 EU_{45}	—	March 11, 2002	Palomar	NEAT	(21344)	2.5 km	MPC · JPL
126817	2002 EZ_{51}	—	March 9, 2002	Socorro	LINEAR	·	2.5 km	MPC · JPL
126818	2002 EE_{52}	—	March 9, 2002	Socorro	LINEAR	·	3.2 km	MPC · JPL
126819	2002 ET_{52}	—	March 9, 2002	Socorro	LINEAR	(11882)	3.6 km	MPC · JPL
126820	2002 EF_{53}	—	March 13, 2002	Socorro	LINEAR	·	3.1 km	MPC · JPL
126821	2002 EC_{55}	—	March 9, 2002	Socorro	LINEAR	·	3.1 km	MPC · JPL
126822	2002 EQ_{55}	—	March 13, 2002	Socorro	LINEAR	·	2.0 km	MPC · JPL
126823	2002 EL_{56}	—	March 13, 2002	Socorro	LINEAR	·	5.8 km	MPC · JPL
126824	2002 ES_{56}	—	March 13, 2002	Socorro	LINEAR	·	3.0 km	MPC · JPL
126825	2002 EK_{57}	—	March 13, 2002	Socorro	LINEAR	·	2.4 km	MPC · JPL
126826	2002 EL_{58}	—	March 13, 2002	Socorro	LINEAR	·	3.2 km	MPC · JPL
126827	2002 EL_{59}	—	March 13, 2002	Socorro	LINEAR	·	1.9 km	MPC · JPL
126828	2002 ER_{59}	—	March 13, 2002	Socorro	LINEAR	·	2.2 km	MPC · JPL
126829	2002 EB_{61}	—	March 13, 2002	Socorro	LINEAR	AGN	1.9 km	MPC · JPL
126830	2002 ES_{61}	—	March 13, 2002	Socorro	LINEAR	·	2.0 km	MPC · JPL
126831	2002 EF_{62}	—	March 13, 2002	Socorro	LINEAR	·	1.9 km	MPC · JPL
126832	2002 EO_{62}	—	March 13, 2002	Socorro	LINEAR	·	2.9 km	MPC · JPL
126833	2002 EZ_{62}	—	March 13, 2002	Socorro	LINEAR	·	1.7 km	MPC · JPL
126834	2002 EO_{63}	—	March 13, 2002	Socorro	LINEAR	·	4.3 km	MPC · JPL
126835	2002 EE_{64}	—	March 13, 2002	Socorro	LINEAR	·	2.7 km	MPC · JPL
126836	2002 EP_{64}	—	March 13, 2002	Socorro	LINEAR	·	2.1 km	MPC · JPL
126837	2002 ER_{64}	—	March 13, 2002	Socorro	LINEAR	·	2.2 km	MPC · JPL
126838	2002 EZ_{64}	—	March 13, 2002	Socorro	LINEAR	·	3.0 km	MPC · JPL
126839	2002 EM_{65}	—	March 13, 2002	Socorro	LINEAR	(5)	1.9 km	MPC · JPL
126840	2002 EP_{65}	—	March 13, 2002	Socorro	LINEAR	·	3.0 km	MPC · JPL
126841	2002 ED_{66}	—	March 13, 2002	Socorro	LINEAR	·	4.1 km	MPC · JPL
126842	2002 EF_{66}	—	March 13, 2002	Socorro	LINEAR	·	3.9 km	MPC · JPL
126843	2002 EV_{66}	—	March 13, 2002	Socorro	LINEAR	·	2.7 km	MPC · JPL
126844	2002 EA_{67}	—	March 13, 2002	Socorro	LINEAR	EOS	2.9 km	MPC · JPL
126845	2002 EX_{67}	—	March 13, 2002	Socorro	LINEAR	·	2.4 km	MPC · JPL
126846	2002 EN_{69}	—	March 13, 2002	Socorro	LINEAR	EUN	2.8 km	MPC · JPL
126847	2002 EJ_{70}	—	March 13, 2002	Socorro	LINEAR	·	2.6 km	MPC · JPL
126848	2002 EL_{70}	—	March 13, 2002	Socorro	LINEAR	·	4.9 km	MPC · JPL
126849	2002 EF_{72}	—	March 13, 2002	Socorro	LINEAR	·	2.3 km	MPC · JPL
126850	2002 EE_{73}	—	March 13, 2002	Socorro	LINEAR	·	3.2 km	MPC · JPL
126851	2002 EF_{73}	—	March 13, 2002	Socorro	LINEAR	·	3.6 km	MPC · JPL
126852	2002 EV_{73}	—	March 13, 2002	Socorro	LINEAR	·	8.0 km	MPC · JPL
126853	2002 EJ_{74}	—	March 13, 2002	Socorro	LINEAR	·	6.4 km	MPC · JPL
126854	2002 ES_{74}	—	March 13, 2002	Socorro	LINEAR	·	1.8 km	MPC · JPL
126855	2002 EB_{75}	—	March 13, 2002	Socorro	LINEAR	·	2.7 km	MPC · JPL
126856	2002 EL_{75}	—	March 14, 2002	Socorro	LINEAR	·	2.6 km	MPC · JPL
126857	2002 EH_{78}	—	March 11, 2002	Kitt Peak	Spacewatch	·	3.3 km	MPC · JPL
126858	2002 EQ_{78}	—	March 15, 2002	Kitt Peak	Spacewatch	·	3.1 km	MPC · JPL
126859	2002 ET_{78}	—	March 10, 2002	Haleakala	NEAT	·	4.1 km	MPC · JPL
126860	2002 EO_{79}	—	March 10, 2002	Haleakala	NEAT	·	3.8 km	MPC · JPL
126861	2002 EC_{81}	—	March 13, 2002	Palomar	NEAT	AGN	1.7 km	MPC · JPL
126862	2002 EP_{83}	—	March 9, 2002	Socorro	LINEAR	AGN	2.8 km	MPC · JPL
126863	2002 EU_{83}	—	March 9, 2002	Socorro	LINEAR	·	4.5 km	MPC · JPL
126864	2002 EK_{84}	—	March 9, 2002	Socorro	LINEAR	·	3.7 km	MPC · JPL
126865	2002 EL_{84}	—	March 9, 2002	Socorro	LINEAR	KOR	2.4 km	MPC · JPL
126866	2002 EP_{85}	—	March 9, 2002	Socorro	LINEAR	·	4.2 km	MPC · JPL
126867	2002 ES_{85}	—	March 9, 2002	Socorro	LINEAR	·	2.2 km	MPC · JPL
126868	2002 EW_{85}	—	March 9, 2002	Socorro	LINEAR	NYS	2.7 km	MPC · JPL
126869	2002 EZ_{85}	—	March 9, 2002	Socorro	LINEAR	·	3.1 km	MPC · JPL
126870	2002 EV_{86}	—	March 9, 2002	Socorro	LINEAR	·	2.1 km	MPC · JPL
126871	2002 EM_{87}	—	March 9, 2002	Socorro	LINEAR	THM	5.9 km	MPC · JPL
126872	2002 EG_{88}	—	March 9, 2002	Socorro	LINEAR	(5)	2.3 km	MPC · JPL
126873	2002 EH_{88}	—	March 9, 2002	Socorro	LINEAR	·	4.0 km	MPC · JPL
126874	2002 EY_{88}	—	March 9, 2002	Socorro	LINEAR	·	1.9 km	MPC · JPL
126875	2002 EG_{89}	—	March 11, 2002	Socorro	LINEAR	·	5.1 km	MPC · JPL
126876	2002 EE_{90}	—	March 12, 2002	Socorro	LINEAR	·	3.7 km	MPC · JPL
126877	2002 EZ_{90}	—	March 12, 2002	Socorro	LINEAR	·	2.0 km	MPC · JPL
126878	2002 ES_{91}	—	March 12, 2002	Socorro	LINEAR	·	4.8 km	MPC · JPL
126879	2002 EJ_{94}	—	March 14, 2002	Socorro	LINEAR	MAS	1.4 km	MPC · JPL
126880	2002 EX_{94}	—	March 14, 2002	Socorro	LINEAR	·	2.4 km	MPC · JPL
126881	2002 EH_{96}	—	March 10, 2002	Kitt Peak	Spacewatch	(5)	2.0 km	MPC · JPL
126882	2002 EH_{97}	—	March 11, 2002	Socorro	LINEAR	DOR	5.8 km	MPC · JPL
126883	2002 EM_{98}	—	March 13, 2002	Socorro	LINEAR	·	2.9 km	MPC · JPL
126884	2002 ET_{98}	—	March 13, 2002	Socorro	LINEAR	·	3.6 km	MPC · JPL
126885	2002 EZ_{98}	—	March 15, 2002	Socorro	LINEAR	·	5.1 km	MPC · JPL
126886	2002 EF_{99}	—	March 15, 2002	Socorro	LINEAR	·	4.2 km	MPC · JPL
126887	2002 EM_{99}	—	March 2, 2002	Anderson Mesa	LONEOS	·	2.0 km	MPC · JPL
126888 Tspitzer	2002 EO_{100}	Tspitzer	March 5, 2002	Catalina	CSS	·	1.7 km	MPC · JPL
126889	2002 EW_{101}	—	March 6, 2002	Socorro	LINEAR	EUN	2.8 km	MPC · JPL
126890	2002 EZ_{101}	—	March 6, 2002	Socorro	LINEAR	·	3.0 km	MPC · JPL
126891	2002 EK_{103}	—	March 9, 2002	Anderson Mesa	LONEOS	EOS	4.9 km	MPC · JPL
126892	2002 EL_{103}	—	March 9, 2002	Anderson Mesa	LONEOS	·	2.2 km	MPC · JPL
126893	2002 EL_{104}	—	March 9, 2002	Anderson Mesa	LONEOS	·	4.1 km	MPC · JPL
126894	2002 EW_{104}	—	March 9, 2002	Socorro	LINEAR	·	2.6 km	MPC · JPL
126895	2002 EF_{105}	—	March 9, 2002	Anderson Mesa	LONEOS	·	3.8 km	MPC · JPL
126896	2002 EB_{106}	—	March 9, 2002	Anderson Mesa	LONEOS	·	8.1 km	MPC · JPL
126897	2002 EB_{107}	—	March 9, 2002	Anderson Mesa	LONEOS	·	5.7 km	MPC · JPL
126898	2002 EK_{107}	—	March 9, 2002	Anderson Mesa	LONEOS	EOS	3.7 km	MPC · JPL
126899	2002 ES_{107}	—	March 10, 2002	Kitt Peak	Spacewatch	·	2.2 km	MPC · JPL
126900	2002 EL_{108}	—	March 9, 2002	Palomar	NEAT	·	1.9 km	MPC · JPL

== 126901–127000 ==
back to top

Designation			Discovery			Properties		Ref
Permanent	Provisional	Named after	Date	Site	Discoverer(s)	Category	Diam.	Ref
126901 Craigstevens	2002 EE_{110}	Craigstevens	March 9, 2002	Catalina	CSS	·	2.7 km	MPC · JPL
126902	2002 EJ_{110}	—	March 9, 2002	Catalina	CSS	MRX	2.1 km	MPC · JPL
126903	2002 EX_{110}	—	March 9, 2002	Anderson Mesa	LONEOS	·	1.9 km	MPC · JPL
126904	2002 EN_{111}	—	March 9, 2002	Anderson Mesa	LONEOS	·	5.0 km	MPC · JPL
126905 Junetveekrem	2002 EF_{112}	Junetveekrem	March 9, 2002	Catalina	CSS	EOS	3.7 km	MPC · JPL
126906 Andykulessa	2002 EX_{114}	Andykulessa	March 10, 2002	Goodricke-Pigott	R. A. Tucker	·	8.3 km	MPC · JPL
126907	2002 EQ_{115}	—	March 10, 2002	Haleakala	NEAT	WIT	2.1 km	MPC · JPL
126908	2002 EV_{115}	—	March 10, 2002	Haleakala	NEAT	slow	3.3 km	MPC · JPL
126909	2002 EK_{119}	—	March 10, 2002	Kitt Peak	Spacewatch	·	3.8 km	MPC · JPL
126910	2002 EX_{121}	—	March 12, 2002	Palomar	NEAT	·	2.0 km	MPC · JPL
126911	2002 EM_{122}	—	March 12, 2002	Palomar	NEAT	·	3.0 km	MPC · JPL
126912	2002 EQ_{122}	—	March 12, 2002	Anderson Mesa	LONEOS	·	5.1 km	MPC · JPL
126913	2002 EN_{123}	—	March 12, 2002	Palomar	NEAT	·	2.7 km	MPC · JPL
126914	2002 EQ_{125}	—	March 10, 2002	Haleakala	NEAT	KOR	2.8 km	MPC · JPL
126915	2002 EV_{125}	—	March 11, 2002	Socorro	LINEAR	·	2.5 km	MPC · JPL
126916	2002 EF_{127}	—	March 12, 2002	Palomar	NEAT	·	2.4 km	MPC · JPL
126917	2002 EE_{128}	—	March 12, 2002	Palomar	NEAT	·	3.7 km	MPC · JPL
126918	2002 EG_{129}	—	March 13, 2002	Socorro	LINEAR	·	4.9 km	MPC · JPL
126919	2002 ES_{131}	—	March 13, 2002	Kitt Peak	Spacewatch	·	2.5 km	MPC · JPL
126920	2002 EV_{131}	—	March 13, 2002	Kitt Peak	Spacewatch	·	4.3 km	MPC · JPL
126921	2002 ED_{133}	—	March 13, 2002	Socorro	LINEAR	·	2.4 km	MPC · JPL
126922	2002 EG_{133}	—	March 13, 2002	Socorro	LINEAR	KOR	2.6 km	MPC · JPL
126923	2002 EC_{135}	—	March 13, 2002	Palomar	NEAT	·	1.8 km	MPC · JPL
126924	2002 EJ_{135}	—	March 13, 2002	Palomar	NEAT	·	2.6 km	MPC · JPL
126925	2002 EV_{136}	—	March 12, 2002	Palomar	NEAT	AGN	2.0 km	MPC · JPL
126926	2002 EZ_{136}	—	March 12, 2002	Palomar	NEAT	·	2.3 km	MPC · JPL
126927	2002 EE_{137}	—	March 12, 2002	Palomar	NEAT	·	3.8 km	MPC · JPL
126928	2002 EQ_{137}	—	March 12, 2002	Anderson Mesa	LONEOS	·	4.6 km	MPC · JPL
126929	2002 ER_{138}	—	March 12, 2002	Palomar	NEAT	KOR	2.5 km	MPC · JPL
126930	2002 EA_{143}	—	March 12, 2002	Palomar	NEAT	·	2.4 km	MPC · JPL
126931	2002 EU_{143}	—	March 13, 2002	Socorro	LINEAR	·	2.8 km	MPC · JPL
126932	2002 EX_{144}	—	March 13, 2002	Socorro	LINEAR	·	2.8 km	MPC · JPL
126933	2002 EK_{145}	—	March 13, 2002	Socorro	LINEAR	·	2.5 km	MPC · JPL
126934	2002 EF_{146}	—	March 14, 2002	Socorro	LINEAR	NYS	2.2 km	MPC · JPL
126935	2002 EN_{146}	—	March 14, 2002	Anderson Mesa	LONEOS	·	3.1 km	MPC · JPL
126936	2002 EG_{149}	—	March 15, 2002	Socorro	LINEAR	·	3.2 km	MPC · JPL
126937	2002 EZ_{152}	—	March 15, 2002	Palomar	NEAT	·	4.3 km	MPC · JPL
126938	2002 EC_{153}	—	March 15, 2002	Palomar	NEAT	EOS	4.1 km	MPC · JPL
126939	2002 EM_{153}	—	March 15, 2002	Kitt Peak	Spacewatch	·	5.0 km	MPC · JPL
126940	2002 FJ	—	March 16, 2002	Desert Eagle	W. K. Y. Yeung	·	3.9 km	MPC · JPL
126941	2002 FL	—	March 16, 2002	Desert Eagle	W. K. Y. Yeung	·	2.6 km	MPC · JPL
126942	2002 FP	—	March 18, 2002	Desert Eagle	W. K. Y. Yeung	PAD	4.8 km	MPC · JPL
126943	2002 FX	—	March 18, 2002	Desert Eagle	W. K. Y. Yeung	THM	4.9 km	MPC · JPL
126944	2002 FN_{1}	—	March 19, 2002	Fountain Hills	Hills, Fountain	·	4.6 km	MPC · JPL
126945	2002 FE_{2}	—	March 19, 2002	Desert Eagle	W. K. Y. Yeung	(13314)	5.2 km	MPC · JPL
126946	2002 FF_{2}	—	March 19, 2002	Desert Eagle	W. K. Y. Yeung	·	4.4 km	MPC · JPL
126947	2002 FP_{3}	—	March 18, 2002	Desert Eagle	W. K. Y. Yeung	KOR	2.8 km	MPC · JPL
126948	2002 FX_{3}	—	March 20, 2002	Desert Eagle	W. K. Y. Yeung	·	6.6 km	MPC · JPL
126949	2002 FL_{5}	—	March 16, 2002	Farpoint	G. Hug	PAD	4.7 km	MPC · JPL
126950	2002 FR_{6}	—	March 23, 2002	Nogales	Tenagra II	·	4.0 km	MPC · JPL
126951	2002 FQ_{8}	—	March 16, 2002	Socorro	LINEAR	·	4.7 km	MPC · JPL
126952	2002 FR_{8}	—	March 16, 2002	Socorro	LINEAR	·	2.1 km	MPC · JPL
126953	2002 FM_{9}	—	March 16, 2002	Socorro	LINEAR	·	3.4 km	MPC · JPL
126954	2002 FN_{10}	—	March 17, 2002	Socorro	LINEAR	·	4.1 km	MPC · JPL
126955	2002 FQ_{10}	—	March 17, 2002	Socorro	LINEAR	·	3.8 km	MPC · JPL
126956	2002 FU_{11}	—	March 17, 2002	Kitt Peak	Spacewatch	·	1.9 km	MPC · JPL
126957	2002 FQ_{13}	—	March 16, 2002	Anderson Mesa	LONEOS	JUN	2.3 km	MPC · JPL
126958	2002 FV_{13}	—	March 16, 2002	Haleakala	NEAT	EOS	3.9 km	MPC · JPL
126959	2002 FX_{14}	—	March 16, 2002	Haleakala	NEAT	·	2.3 km	MPC · JPL
126960	2002 FZ_{14}	—	March 16, 2002	Anderson Mesa	LONEOS	·	3.5 km	MPC · JPL
126961	2002 FL_{15}	—	March 16, 2002	Haleakala	NEAT	·	3.5 km	MPC · JPL
126962	2002 FF_{16}	—	March 16, 2002	Haleakala	NEAT	·	4.1 km	MPC · JPL
126963	2002 FG_{16}	—	March 16, 2002	Haleakala	NEAT	·	4.6 km	MPC · JPL
126964	2002 FV_{16}	—	March 17, 2002	Socorro	LINEAR	·	3.3 km	MPC · JPL
126965 Neri	2002 FJ_{18}	Neri	March 18, 2002	Kitt Peak	M. W. Buie	NYS	2.1 km	MPC · JPL
126966	2002 FB_{20}	—	March 18, 2002	Socorro	LINEAR	PAD	3.9 km	MPC · JPL
126967	2002 FR_{20}	—	March 18, 2002	Haleakala	NEAT	·	6.8 km	MPC · JPL
126968	2002 FV_{20}	—	March 19, 2002	Palomar	NEAT	·	2.8 km	MPC · JPL
126969	2002 FX_{20}	—	March 19, 2002	Palomar	NEAT	slow	3.5 km	MPC · JPL
126970	2002 FZ_{21}	—	March 19, 2002	Socorro	LINEAR	·	4.3 km	MPC · JPL
126971	2002 FH_{22}	—	March 19, 2002	Socorro	LINEAR	·	3.1 km	MPC · JPL
126972	2002 FO_{22}	—	March 19, 2002	Palomar	NEAT	PHO	3.0 km	MPC · JPL
126973	2002 FR_{22}	—	March 19, 2002	Socorro	LINEAR	·	5.2 km	MPC · JPL
126974	2002 FV_{22}	—	March 19, 2002	Haleakala	NEAT	·	6.0 km	MPC · JPL
126975	2002 FB_{23}	—	March 17, 2002	Kitt Peak	Spacewatch	KOR	2.0 km	MPC · JPL
126976	2002 FA_{24}	—	March 18, 2002	Kitt Peak	Spacewatch	·	2.2 km	MPC · JPL
126977	2002 FJ_{25}	—	March 19, 2002	Palomar	NEAT	MAR	2.1 km	MPC · JPL
126978	2002 FL_{25}	—	March 19, 2002	Palomar	NEAT	URS	7.2 km	MPC · JPL
126979	2002 FJ_{26}	—	March 19, 2002	Haleakala	NEAT	EOS	5.1 km	MPC · JPL
126980	2002 FK_{26}	—	March 20, 2002	Palomar	NEAT	·	3.5 km	MPC · JPL
126981	2002 FW_{26}	—	March 20, 2002	Socorro	LINEAR	TEL	3.4 km	MPC · JPL
126982	2002 FL_{27}	—	March 20, 2002	Socorro	LINEAR	·	3.9 km	MPC · JPL
126983	2002 FO_{27}	—	March 20, 2002	Socorro	LINEAR	VER	6.6 km	MPC · JPL
126984	2002 FT_{28}	—	March 20, 2002	Socorro	LINEAR	·	3.2 km	MPC · JPL
126985	2002 FU_{28}	—	March 20, 2002	Socorro	LINEAR	·	2.0 km	MPC · JPL
126986	2002 FZ_{28}	—	March 20, 2002	Socorro	LINEAR	·	4.2 km	MPC · JPL
126987	2002 FS_{30}	—	March 20, 2002	Socorro	LINEAR	BRA	3.0 km	MPC · JPL
126988	2002 FX_{30}	—	March 20, 2002	Socorro	LINEAR	·	7.8 km	MPC · JPL
126989	2002 FA_{32}	—	March 20, 2002	Anderson Mesa	LONEOS	·	3.3 km	MPC · JPL
126990	2002 FB_{32}	—	March 20, 2002	Anderson Mesa	LONEOS	·	3.4 km	MPC · JPL
126991	2002 FG_{32}	—	March 20, 2002	Anderson Mesa	LONEOS	·	2.4 km	MPC · JPL
126992	2002 FQ_{33}	—	March 20, 2002	Socorro	LINEAR	·	3.6 km	MPC · JPL
126993	2002 FB_{34}	—	March 20, 2002	Socorro	LINEAR	·	6.2 km	MPC · JPL
126994	2002 FC_{34}	—	March 20, 2002	Socorro	LINEAR	·	3.4 km	MPC · JPL
126995	2002 FZ_{34}	—	March 20, 2002	Kitt Peak	Spacewatch	·	3.7 km	MPC · JPL
126996	2002 FF_{35}	—	March 21, 2002	Anderson Mesa	LONEOS	·	2.1 km	MPC · JPL
126997	2002 FL_{35}	—	March 21, 2002	Anderson Mesa	LONEOS	·	3.2 km	MPC · JPL
126998	2002 FO_{35}	—	March 21, 2002	Anderson Mesa	LONEOS	·	4.6 km	MPC · JPL
126999	2002 FJ_{36}	—	March 22, 2002	Palomar	NEAT	·	2.9 km	MPC · JPL
127000	2002 FN_{36}	—	March 22, 2002	Palomar	NEAT	·	2.7 km	MPC · JPL

back to top

== See also ==
- Meanings of minor-planet names: 126001–127000
